= 2017 TCU Horned Frogs football team =

American college football season

2017 TCU Horned Frogs football

Alamo Bowl champion

Big 12 Championship, L 17–41 vs. Oklahoma

Alamo Bowl, W 39–37 vs. Stanford
- Conference: Big 12 Conference

Ranking
- Coaches: No. 9
- AP: No. 9
- Record: 11–3 (7–2 Big 12)
- Head coach: Gary Patterson (17th season)
- Co-offensive coordinators: Sonny Cumbie (4th season); Curtis Luper (5th season)
- Offensive scheme: Spread
- Defensive coordinator: Chad Glasgow (3rd season)
- Base defense: 4–2–5
- Home stadium: Amon G. Carter Stadium

2017 Big 12 Conference football standings
	Conf.			Overall
Team	W		L	W		L
No. 3 Oklahoma y$^	8	–	1	12	–	2
No. 9 TCU y	7	–	2	11	–	3
No. 14 Oklahoma State	6	–	3	10	–	3
Texas	5	–	4	7	–	6
West Virginia	5	–	4	7	–	6
Kansas State	5	–	4	8	–	5
Iowa State	5	–	4	8	–	5
Texas Tech	3	–	6	6	–	7
Baylor	1	–	8	1	–	11
Kansas	0	–	9	1	–	11
Championship: Oklahoma 41, TCU 17
^ – College Football Playoff participant; $ – Conference champion; y – Championship game participant; Rankings from AP Poll

The 2017 TCU Horned Frogs football team represented Texas Christian University in the 2017 NCAA Division I FBS football season. The 122nd TCU football team played as a member of the Big 12 Conference and played their home games at Amon G. Carter Stadium, on the TCU campus in Fort Worth, Texas. They were led by 17th-year head coach Gary Patterson. They finished the season 11–3, 7–2 in Big 12 play to finish in second place. They lost to Oklahoma in the Big 12 Championship Game. They were invited to the Alamo Bowl where they defeated Stanford.

== Schedule ==
Date	Time	Opponent	Rank	Site	TV	Result	Attendance
September 2	7:00 p.m.	Jackson State*		Amon G. Carter Stadium; Fort Worth, TX	FSN	W 63–0	42,709
September 9	2:30 p.m.	at Arkansas*	No. 23	Donald W. Reynolds Razorback Stadium; Fayetteville, AR	CBS	W 28–7	73,668
September 16	2:30 p.m.	SMU*	No. 20	Amon G. Carter Stadium; Fort Worth, TX (97th Battle for the Iron Skillet)	ESPNU	W 56–36	44,489
September 23	2:30 p.m.	at No. 6 Oklahoma State	No. 16	Boone Pickens Stadium; Stillwater, OK	ESPN	W 44–31	56,790
October 7	2:30 p.m.	No. 23 West Virginia	No. 8	Amon G. Carter Stadium; Fort Worth, TX (ESPN College GameDay)	FS1	W 31–24	43,257
October 14	11:00 a.m.	at Kansas State	No. 6	Bill Snyder Family Stadium; Manhattan, KS	FS1	W 26–6	52,055
October 21	7:00 p.m.	Kansas^{†}	No. 4	Amon G. Carter Stadium; Fort Worth, TX	FOX	W 43–0	42,969
October 28	2:30 p.m.	at No. 25 Iowa State	No. 4	Jack Trice Stadium; Ames, IA	ABC/ESPN2	L 7–14	56,259
November 4	6:15 p.m.	Texas	No. 8	Amon G. Carter Stadium; Fort Worth, TX (rivalry)	ESPN	W 24–7	48,042
November 11	7:00 p.m.	at No. 5 Oklahoma	No. 6	Gaylord Family Oklahoma Memorial Stadium; Norman, OK	FOX	L 20–38	88,308
November 18	11:00 a.m.	at Texas Tech	No. 12	Jones AT&T Stadium; Lubbock, TX (60th West Texas Championship)	FS1	W 27–3	51,278
November 24	11:00 a.m.	Baylor	No. 12	Amon G. Carter Stadium; Fort Worth, TX (113th Revivalry)	FS1	W 45–22	43,015
December 2	11:30 a.m.	vs. No. 3 Oklahoma	No. 11	AT&T Stadium; Arlington, TX (Big 12 Championship Game)	FOX	L 17–41	64,104
December 28	8:00 p.m.	vs. No. 15 Stanford*	No. 13	Alamodome; San Antonio, TX (Alamo Bowl)	ESPN	W 39–37	57,653
*Non-conference game; ^{†}Homecoming; Rankings from Rankings from the College Football Playoff Selection Committee released prior to game (AP Poll in weeks without CFP rankings); All times are in Central time

== Game summaries ==
=== Jackson State ===
Jackson State Tigers at TCU Horned Frogs – Game Summary

Quarter	1	2	3	4	Total
Tigers	0	0	0	0	0
Horned Frogs	21	14	21	7	63

at Amon G. Carter Stadium • Fort Worth, TX

- Date: September 2, 2017
- Game time: 7:00 p.m. CT (actual: 7:05 p.m – 10:20 p.m.)
- Game weather: Partly cloudy, 91°F, wind SE 5 mph
- Game attendance: 42,709
- Referee: Eddy Shelton, Umpire: M. Fitzgerald, Linesman: Rick Smith, Line judge: Scott Reilly, Back judge: Terry White, Field judge: Nick Lave, Side judge: Richard Corona, Center judge: Mike Contreraz
- TV announcers (FSN): Mark Followill (play-by-play), Brian Baldinger (color), Lesley McCaslin (sideline)
- Sources: TCU Game Notes, GoFrogs.com

Game information

First Quarter

- 8:10 – TCU – Kenedy Snell, 13-yd pass from Kenny Hill (Jonathan Song, kick), JSU 0 – TCU 7
- 5:33 – TCU – Emanuel Porter, 4-yd pass from Kenny Hill (Jonathan Song, kick), JSU 0 – TCU 14
- 1:35 – TCU – KaVontae Turpin, 39-yd run (Jonathan Song, kick), JSU 0 – TCU 21

Second Quarter

- 7:24 – TCU – Ridwan Issahaku, 53-yd interception return (Jonathan Song, kick), JSU 0 – TCU 28
- 2:13 – TCU – Desmon White, 13-yd pass from Kenny Hill (Jonathan Song, kick), JSU 0 – TCU 35

Third Quarter

- 10:20 – TCU – Desmon White, 37-yd pass from Kenny Hill (Brandon Ritchie, kick), JSU 0 – TCU 42
- 6:15 – TCU – TreVontae Hights, 56-yd pass from Shawn Robinson (Jonathan Song, kick), JSU 0 – TCU 49
- 4:43 – TCU – Arico Evans, 32-yd fumble recovery (Jonathan Song, kick), JSU 0 – TCU 56

Fourth Quarter

- 6:15 – TCU – Dylan Thomas 10-yd pass from Shawn Robinson (Jonathan Song, kick), JSU 0 – TCU 63

Top Passers

- JSU – Brent Lyles: 5–9, 0 INT, 40 yds
- TCU – Kenny Hill: 18–23, 1 INT, 206 yds, 4 TD

Top Receiving

- JSU – Jevon Floyd: 2 receptions, 23 yards
- TCU – Ty Slanina: 4 receptions, 24 yards

Top Rushers

- JSU – Jordan Johnson: 13 rushes, 41 yards (3.2)
- TCU – Darius Anderson: 13 rushes, 67 yards (5.2)

=== At Arkansas ===
#23 TCU Horned Frogs at Arkansas Razorbacks – Game Summary

Quarter	1	2	3	4	Total
#23 Horned Frogs	7	7	0	14	28
Razorbacks	7	0	0	0	7

at Donald W. Reynolds Razorback Stadium • Fayetteville, AR

- Date: September 9, 2017
- Game time: 2:30 p.m. CT (actual: 2:30 p.m. – 5:46 p.m.)
- Game weather: Partly cloudy, 82°F, wind E 10 mph
- Game attendance: 73,668
- Referee: Reggie Smith, Umpire: Tab Slaughter, Linesman: Mike Moeller, Line judge: Mark Stewart, Back judge: Lyndon Nixon, Field judge: Matt Mills, Side judge: Tim Murray, Center judge: Stacy Hardin
- TV announcers (CBS): Brad Nessler (play-by-play), Gary Danielson (color), Allie LaForce (sideline)
- Sources: TCU Game Notes, GoFrogs.com

Game information

First Quarter

- 10:43 – TCU – Sewo Olonilua, 1-yd run (Jonathan Song, kick), TCU 7 – ARK 0
- 8:15 – ARK – Jonathan Nance, 49-yd pass from Austin Allen (Cole Hedlund, kick), TCU 7 – ARK 7

Second Quarter

- 7:39 – TCU – Kyle Hicks, 4-yd run (Jonathan Song, kick), TCU 14 – ARK 7

Fourth Quarter

- 2:18 – TCU – Darius Anderson, 14-yd run (Jonathan Song, kick), TCU 21 – ARK 7
- 2:04 – TCU – Sewo Olonilua, 13-yd run (Jonathan Song, kick), TCU 28 – ARK 7

Top Passers

- TCU – Kenny Hill: 21–31, 1 INT, 166 yds
- Arkansas – Austin Allen: 9–23, 138 yds, 1 TD

Top Receiving

- TCU – Desmon White: 5 receptions, 33 yards
- Arkansas – Jonathan Nance: 3 receptions, 75 yards

Top Rushers

- TCU – Darius Anderson: 15 rushes, 106 yards (7.1)
- Arkansas – David Williams: 10 rushes, 65 yards (6.5)

=== SMU ===
SMU Mustangs at #20 TCU Horned Frogs – Game Summary

Quarter	1	2	3	4	Total
Mustangs	16	6	7	7	36
#20 Horned Frogs	7	21	7	21	56

at Amon G. Carter Stadium • Fort Worth, TX

- Date: September 16, 2017
- Game time: 2:30 p.m. CT (actual: 2:32 p.m. – 5:54)
- Game weather: Sunny and clear, 92°F, wind S 12 mph
- Game attendance: 44,489
- Referee: Todd LaPenta, Umpire: Bill Lamkin, Linesman: Todd Riddick, Line judge: Jeffrey Cooney, Back judge: Victor Firth, Field judge: James Reif, Side judge: Matthew Hill, Center judge: Terry Killens
- TV announcers (ESPNU): Roy Philpott (play-by-play), Tom Ramsey (color)
- Sources: TCU Game Notes, GoFrogs.com

Game information

First Quarter

- 12:48 – SMU – Trey Quinn, 58-yd pass from Ben Hicks (Josh Williams, kick failed), SMU 6 – TCU 0
- 11:00 – TCU – Kenedy Snell, 10-yd run (Jonathan Song, kick), SMU 6 – TCU 7
- 8:21 – SMU – Ke'Mon Freeman, 1-yd run (Josh Williams, kick), SMU 13 – TCU 7
- 5:01 – SMU – Josh Williams, 29-yd field goal, SMU 16 – TCU 7

Second Quarter

- 12:10 – SMU – Josh Williams, 34-yd field goal, SMU 19 – TCU 7
- 7:30 – TCU – Shaun Nixon, 10-yd pass from Kenny Hill (Jonathan Song, kick), SMU 19 – TCU 14
- 2:40 – TCU – Kenedy Snell, 71-yd pass from Kenny Hill (Jonathan Song, kick), SMU 19 – TCU 21
- 0:17 – SMU – Josh Williams, 21-yd field goal, SMU 22 – TCU 21
- 0:00 – TCU – Jalen Reagor, 38-yd pass from Kenny Hill (Jonathan Song, kick), SMU 22 – TCU 28

Third Quarter

- 10:32 – TCU – Darius Anderson, 4-yd run (Jonathan Song, kick), SMU 22 – TCU 35
- 1:39 – SMU – Ke'Mon Freeman, 34-yd run (Josh Williams, kick), SMU 29 – TCU 35

Fourth Quarter

- 13:27 – TCU – Darius Anderson, 34-yd run (Jonathan Song, kick), SMU 29 – TCU 42
- 8:35 – TCU – KaVontae Turpin, 27-yd pass from Kenny Hill (Jonathan Song, kick), SMU 29 – TCU 49
- 7:43 – TCU – Travin Howard, 19-yd interception return (Jonathan Song, kick), SMU 29 – TCU 56
- 6:50 – SMU – James Proche, 61-yd pass from Ben Hicks (Josh Williams, kick), SMU 36 – TCU 56

Top Passers

- SMU – Ben Hicks: 17–37, 2 INT, 305 yds, 2 TD
- TCU – Kenny Hill: 24–30, 0 INT, 365 yds, 4 TD

Top Receiving

- SMU – Trey Quinn: 7 receptions, 116 yards, 1 TD
- TCU – KaVontae Turpin: 7 receptions, 88 yards, 1 TD

Top Rushers

- SMU – Ke'Mon Freeman: 12 rushes, 57 yards (4.8)
- TCU – Darius Anderson: 14 rushes, 89 yards (6.4)

=== At No. 6 Oklahoma State ===
#16 TCU Horned Frogs at #6 Oklahoma State Cowboys – Game Summary

Quarter	1	2	3	4	Total
#16 Horned Frogs	6	14	14	10	44
#6 Cowboys	7	3	7	14	31

at Boone Pickens Stadium • Stillwater, OK

- Date: September 23, 2017
- Game time: 2:30 p.m. CT (actual: 2:35 p.m. – 6:06 p.m.)
- Game weather: Mostly sunny, 90°F, wind SSE 13 mph
- Game attendance: 56,790
- Referee: Reggie Smith, Umpire: Tab Slaughter, Linesman: Mike Moeller, Line judge: Mark Stewart, Back judge: Lyndon Nixon, Field judge: Matt Mills, Side judge: Tim Murray, Center judge: Dan Scanlan
- TV announcers (ESPN): Steve Levy (play-by-play), Brian Griese (color), Todd McShay (sideline)
- Sources: TCU Game Notes, GoFrogs.com

Game information

First Quarter

- 10:46 – TCU – Jonathan Song, 29-yd field goal, TCU 3 – OSU 0
- 2:45 – TCU – Jonathan Song, 31-yd field goal, TCU 6 – OSU 0
- 2:15 – OSU – James Washington, 86-yd pass from Mason Rudolph (Matt Ammendola, kick), TCU 6 – OSU 7

Second Quarter

- 14:28 – TCU – Darius Anderson, 28-yd run (Jonathan Song, kick), TCU 13 – OSU 7
- 7:15 – TCU – John Diarse, 9-yd pass from Kenny Hill (Jonathan Song, kick), TCU 20 – OSU 7
- 4:46 – OSU – Matt Ammendola, 29-yd field goal, TCU 20 – OSU 10

Third Quarter

- 11:59 – TCU – Darius Anderson, 6-yd run (Jonathan Song, kick), TCU 27 – OSU 10
- 8:37 – OSU – Dillon Stoner 14-yd pass from Mason Rudolph (Matt Ammendola, kick), TCU 27 – OSU 17
- 4:34 – TCU – Sewo Olonilua, 1-yd run (Jonathan Song, kick), TCU 34 - OSU 17

Fourth Quarter

- 12:03 – TCU – Jonathan Song, 31-yd field goal, TCU 37 – OSU 17
- 9:44 – OSU – Mason Rudolph, 1-yd run (Matt Ammendola, kick), TCU 37 – OSU 24
- 3:03 – OSU – Justice Hill, 1-yd run (Matt Ammendola, kick), TCU 37 – OSU 31
- 2:37 – TCU – Darius Anderson, 42-yd run (Jonathan Song, kick), TCU 44 – OSU 31

Top Passers

- TCU – Kenny Hill: 22–33, 1 INT, 228 yds, 1 TD
- OSU – Mason Rudolph: 22–41, 2 INT, 398 yds, 2 TD

Top Receiving

- TCU – Desmon White: 5 receptions, 25 yards
- OSU – James Washington: 6 receptions, 153 yards, 1 TD

Top Rushers

- TCU – Darius Anderson: 26 rushes, 160 yards (6.2), 3 TD
- OSU – Justice Hill: 25 rushes, 102 yards (4.1), 1 TD

=== No. 23 West Virginia ===
#23 West Virginia Mountaineers at #8 TCU Horned Frogs – Game Summary

Quarter	1	2	3	4	Total
#23 Mountaineers	3	0	14	7	24
#8 Horned Frogs	0	7	17	7	31

at Amon G. Carter Stadium • Fort Worth, TX

- Date: October 7, 2017
- Game time: 2:30 p.m. CT (actual: 2:40 p.m. – 6:00 p.m.)
- Game weather: Sunny & clear, 83°F, wind NW 12 mph
- Game attendance: 43,257
- Referee: Brandon Cruse, Umpire: Rick Podraza, Linesman: B. Edwards, Line judge: Quentin Givens, Back judge: Daniel Young, Field judge: Glenn Crowther, Side judge: Tuta Salaam, Center judge: Darren Winkley
- TV announcers (FS1): Aaron Goldsmith (play-by-play), Brady Quinn (color), Bruce Feldman (sideline)
- Sources: TCU Game Notes, GoFrogs.com

Game information

First Quarter

- 7:30 – WVU – Mike Molina, 37-yd field goal, WVU 3 – TCU 0

Second Quarter

- 14:16 – TCU – Sewo Olonilua, 2-yd run (Jonathan Song, kick), WVU 3 – TCU 7

Third Quarter

- 8:36 – TCU – Jonathan Song, 37-yd field goal, WVU 3 – TCU 10
- 6:06 – TCU – Jalen Reagor, 45-yd pass from Kenny Hill (Jonathan Song, kick), WVU 3 – TCU 17
- 3:52 – WVU – David Sills, 64-yd pass from Will Grier (Mike Molina, kick), WVU 10 – TCU 17
- 1:37 – WVU – Ka'Raun White, 76-yd pass from Will Grier (Mike Molina, kick), WVU 17 – TCU 17
- 0:15 – TCU – Kenny Hill, 48-yd pass from KaVontae Turpin (Jonathan Song, kick), WVU 17 – TCU 24

Fourth Quarter

- 9:50 – WVU – David Sills, 4-yd pass from Will Grier (Mike Molina, kick), WVU 24 – TCU 24
- 2:53 – TCU – Kenny Hill, 3-yd run (Jonathan Song, kick), WVU 24 – TCU 31

Top Passers

- WVU – Will Grier: 25–45, 1 INT, 366 yds, 3 TD
- TCU – Kenny Hill: 15–28, 0 INT, 188 yds, 1 TD

Top Receiving

- WVU – Gary Jennings Jr.: 10 receptions, 80 yards, 0 TD
- TCU – John Diarse: 4 receptions, 70 yards, 0 TD

Top Rushers

- WVU – Justin Crawford: 19 rushes, 111 yards (5.8)
- TCU – Kyle Hicks: 11 rushes, 71 yards (6.5)

=== At Kansas State ===
#6 TCU Horned Frogs at Kansas State Wildcats – Game Summary

Quarter	1	2	3	4	Total
#6 Horned Frogs	10	3	7	6	26
Wildcats	0	3	3	0	6

at Bill Snyder Family Football Stadium • Manhattan, KS

- Date: October 14, 2017
- Game time: 11 a.m. CT (actual 2:00 p.m. – 6:15 p.m.
- Game weather: Cloudy, 68°F, wind S 3–25 mph
- Game attendance: 52,055
- Referee: Brad Van Vark, Umpire: Michael Cooper, Linesman: George Gusman, Line judge: Frank LeBlanc, Back judge: Brian Ernest, Field judge: Jason Ledet, Side judge: Fulton Carson, Center judge: Brian Alos
- TV announcers (FS1): Joe Davis (play-by-play), Brady Quinn (color), Bruce Feldman (sideline)
- Sources: TCU Game Notes, GoFrogs.com

Game information

First Quarter

- 3:54 – TCU – Kenny Hill, 7-yd run (Jonathan Song, kick), TCU 7 – KSU 0
- 1:43 – TCU – Jonathan Song, 39-yd field goal, TCU 10 – KSU 0

Second Quarter

- 5:44 – TCU – Jonathan Song, 22-yd field goal, TCU 13 – KSU 0
- 2: 27 – KSU – Matt McCrane, 38-yd field goal, TCU 13 – KSU 3

Third Quarter

- 10:01 – TCU – Sewo Olonilua, 1-yd run (Jonathan Song, kick), TCU 20 – KSU 3
- 8:21 – KSU – Matt McCrane, 51-yd field goal, TCU 20 – KSU 6

Fourth Quarter

- 8:44 – TCU – Sewo Olonilua, 1-yd run (Jonathan Song, kick failed), TCU 26 – KSU 6

Top Passers

- TCU – Kenny Hill: 27–37, 0 INT, 297 yds, 0 TD
- KSU – Alex Delton: 11–29, 0 INT, 146 yds, TD

Top Receiving

- TCU – KaVontae Turpin: 5 receptions, 70 yards
- KSU – Isaiah Zuber: 4 receptions, 40 yards

Top Rushers

- TCU – Kyle Hicks: 16 rushes, 58 yards (3.6)
- KSU – Alex Delton: 13 rushes, 39 yards (2.1)

=== Kansas ===
Kansas Jayhawks at #4 TCU Horned Frogs – Game Summary

Quarter	1	2	3	4	Total
Jayhawks	0	0	0	0	0
#4 Horned Frogs	10	14	19	0	43

at Amon G. Carter Stadium • Fort Worth, TX

- Date: October 21, 2017
- Game time: 7:00 p.m. CT (actual 7:12 p.m. – 10:12 p.m.)
- Game weather: Partly cloudy, 84°F, wind S 12 mph
- Game attendance: 42,969
- Referee: Mike Defee, Umpire: Robert Richeson, Linesman: Al Green, Line judge: K. Deterding, Back judge: Terry Jones, Field judge: Joe Blubaugh, Side judge: Lo vanPhan, Center judge: Marvel July
- TV announcers (FOX): Tim Brando (play-by-play), Les Miles (color), Spencer Tillman (color), Holly Sonders (sideline)
- Sources: TCU Game Notes, GoFrogs.com

Game information

First Quarter

- 8:28 – TCU – Desmon White, 8-yd pass from Kenny Hill (Jonathan Song, kick), KU 0 – TCU 7
- 1:41 – TCU – Jonathan Song, 19-yd field goal, KU 0 – TCU 10

Second Quarter

- 8:53 – TCU – Jalen Reagor, 22-yd pass from Kenny Hill (Jonathan Song, kick), KU 0 – TCU 17
- 4:54 – TCU – John Diarse, 67-yd pass from Kenny Hill (Jonathan Song, kick), KU 0 – TCU 24

Third Quarter

- 12:34 – TCU – Jalen Reagor, 15-yd pass from Kenny Hill (Jonathan Song, kick failed), KU 0 – TCU 30
- 9:02 – TCU – Taj Williams, 26-yd pass from Kenny Hill (Jonathan song, kick), KU 0 – TCU 37
- 6:46 – TCU – KaVontae Turpin, 90-yd punt return (Cole Bunce, kick failed), KU 0 – TCU 43

Top Passers

- KU – Peyton Bender: 7–16, 0 INT, 38 yds, 0 TD
- TCU – Kenny Hill: 19–26, 0 INT, 278 yds, 5 TD

Top Receiving

- KU – Ben Johnson: 4 receptions, 35 yards, 0 TD
- TCU – John Diarse: 4 receptions, 130 yards, 1 TD

Top Rushers

- KU – Dean Thompson: 5 rushes, 10 yards (2.0)
- TCU – Darius Anderson: 12 rushes, 62 yards (5.2)

=== At No. 25 Iowa State ===
#4 TCU Horned Frogs at #25 Iowa State Cyclones – Game Summary

Quarter	1	2	3	4	Total
#4 Horned Frogs	0	0	7	0	7
#25 Cyclones	7	7	0	0	14

at Jack Trice Stadium • Ames, IA

- Date: October 28, 2017
- Game time: 2:30 p.m. CT
- Game attendance: 56,259
- TV announcers (ABC): Dave Pasch (play-by-play), Greg McElroy (color), Tom Luginbill (sideline)

Game information

First quarter

- ISU – Matthew Eaton 17-yard pass from Kyle Kempt (Garrett Owens kick), 7:45. Cyclones 7–0. Drive: 9 plays, 85 yards, 4:22.

Second quarter

- ISU – Hakeem Butler 4-yard pass from Kyle Kempt (Garrett Owens kick), 3:29. Cyclones 14–0. Drive: 11 plays, 82 yards, 3:35.

Third quarter

- TCU – KaVonte Turpin 94-yard kickoff return (Jonathon Song kick), 14:48. Cyclones 14–7.

Fourth quarter

- No scoring plays

Top passers

- TCU – Kenny Hill – 12/25, 135 yards, 2 INT
- ISU – Kyle Kempt – 21/35, 202 yards, 2 TD, INT

Top rushers

- TCU – Darius Anderson – 12 carries, 95 yards
- ISU – David Montgomery – 25 carries, 74 yards

Top receivers

- TCU – Jaelan Austin – 3 receptions, 39 yards
- ISU – Allen Lazard – 6 receptions, 106 yards

=== Texas ===
Texas Longhorns at TCU Horned Frogs – Game Summary

Quarter	1	2	3	4	Total
Longhorns	0	7	0	0	7
#8 Horned Frogs	7	10	0	7	24

at Amon G. Carter Stadium • Fort Worth, TX

- Date: November 4, 2017
- Game time: 6:15 p.m. CT
- TV: ESPN

=== At No. 5 Oklahoma ===
TCU Horned Frogs at Oklahoma Sooners – Game Summary

Quarter	1	2	3	4	Total
#6 Horned Frogs	7	7	0	6	20
#5 Sooners	17	21	0	0	38

at Gaylord Family Oklahoma Memorial Stadium • Norman, OK

- Date: November 11, 2017

=== At Texas Tech ===
TCU Horned Frogs at Texas Tech Red Raiders – Game Summary

Quarter	1	2	3	4	Total
#12 Horned Frogs	0	10	7	10	27
Red Raiders	3	0	0	0	3

at Jones AT&T Stadium • Lubbock, TX

- Date: November 18, 2017

=== Baylor ===
Baylor Bears at TCU Horned Frogs – Game Summary

Quarter	1	2	3	4	Total
Bears	9	10	3	0	22
#12 Horned Frogs	14	7	14	10	45

at Amon G. Carter Stadium • Fort Worth, TX

- Date: November 24, 2017
- Game time: 11:00 a.m. CT
- TV: FS1

== Rankings ==
Ranking movements Legend: ██ Increase in ranking ██ Decrease in ranking RV = Received votes
	Week															
Poll	Pre	1	2	3	4	5	6	7	8	9	10	11	12	13	14	Final
AP	RV	23	20	16	9	8	6	4	4	10	8	11	10	10	13	9
Coaches	RV	RV	20	15	11	10	7	4	4	12	9	14	13	12	13	9
CFP	Not released									8	6	12	12	11	15	Not released

== Honors and awards ==
=== Preseason awards ===
- Travin Howard (LB)

Preseason All-Big 12

- Nick Orr (S)

Preseason All-Big 12

- Austin Schlottmann (OG)

Preseason All-Big 12

- KaVontae Turpin (WR)

Second-Team Preseason All-American (Return Specialist), USA Today
Preseason All-Big 12 (Return Specialist)

=== Weekly awards ===
- Darius Anderson (RB)

Walter Camp Offensive Player of the Week, at Oklahoma State
Big 12 Offensive Player of the Week, at Oklahoma State
Earl Campbell Tyler Rose Award Player of the Week, at Oklahoma State

- Kenny Hill (QB)

Paul Hornung Award Honor Roll, vs. Kansas
Paul Hornung Award Honor Roll, vs. West Virginia
Earl Campbell Tyler Rose Award Honor Roll, vs. West Virginia
Davey O'Brien Award Quarterback of the Week, at Oklahoma State
Manning Award Star of the week, vs. SMU
Earl Campbell Tyler Rose Award Honor Roll, vs. SMU

- Adam Nunez (P)

Big 12 Special Teams Player of the Week, vs. West Virginia

- Gary Patterson (Head Coach)

Bobby Dodd Trophy Coach of the Week, at Oklahoma State

- KaVontae Turpin (WR)

Big 12 Special Teams Player of the Week, vs. Kansas

=== Major award watch lists ===
- Darius Anderson (RB)

Maxwell Award

- Ben Banogu (DE)

Chuck Bednarik Award

- Kyle Hicks (RB)

Maxwell Award
Doak Walker Award
Earl Campbell Tyler Rose Award
Senior Bowl

- Kenny Hill (QB)

Maxwell Award
Manning Award
Johnny Unitas Golden Arm Award
Earl Campbell Tyler Rose Award

- Travin Howard (LB)

Chuck Bednarik Award
Bronko Nagurski Trophy

- Patrick Morris (C)

Rimington Trophy

- Shaun Nixon (WR)

Wuerffel Trophy
Allstate AFCA Good Works Team Nominee

- Joseph Noteboom (OT)

Senior Bowl

- Adam Nunez (P)

Ray Guy Award

- Nick Orr (S)

Jim Thorpe Award

- Gary Patterson (Head Coach)

Paul "Bear" Bryant Award
Bobby Dodd Trophy

- Austin Schlottmann (OG)

Outland Trophy
Senior Bowl

- Ty Summers (LB)

Chuck Bednarik Award
Lott IMPACT Trophy

- KaVontae Turpin (WR)

Big 12 Special Teams Player of the Week, vs. Kansas
Paul Hornung Award
Earl Campbell Tyler Rose Award

- Taj Williams (WR)

Senior Bowl

=== Major award semifinalists ===
- Kenny Hill (QB)

Davey O'Brien Award
Johnny Unitas Golden Arm Award Top 20

- Patrick Morris (C)

William V. Campbell Trophy

=== Major award finalists ===
- Kenny Hill (QB)

Johnny Unitas Golden Arm Award Top 20

Honors and Awards Source: TCU Game 8 Media Notes (unless otherwise noted)
