= 2017 Big 12 Championship Game =

- 16th Big 12 Championship Game
| TCU Horned Frogs | Oklahoma Sooners |
| (10–2) | (11–1) |
| 17 | 41 |
| Head coach: Gary Patterson | Head coach: Lincoln Riley |
| AP / Coaches / CFP; 10 / 12 / 11 | AP / Coaches / CFP; 2 / 2 / 3 |
| | 1 | 2 | 3 | 4 | Total |
|---|---|---|---|---|---|
| TCU | 0 | 17 | 0 | 0 | 17 |
| Oklahoma | 17 | 7 | 17 | 0 | 41 |
- Date: December 2, 2017
- Season: 2017
- Stadium: AT&T Stadium
- Location: Arlington, Texas
- Favorite: Oklahoma by 7.5
- National anthem: The Pride of Oklahoma Marching Band
- Referee: Mike Defee
- Attendance: 64,104

United States TV coverage
- Network: FOX/ESPN Radio
- Announcers: Joe Davis, Brady Quinn, Bruce Feldman and Petros Papadakis (FOX); Marc Kestecher, Barrett Jones and Ian Fitzsimmons (ESPN Radio)

2017 Big 12 Conference football standings
| | Conf. | | | Overall |
| Team | W | | L | W | | L |
|---|---|---|---|---|---|---|
| No. 3 Oklahoma y$^ | 8 | – | 1 | 12 | – | 2 |
| No. 9 TCU y | 7 | – | 2 | 11 | – | 3 |
| No. 14 Oklahoma State | 6 | – | 3 | 10 | – | 3 |
| Texas | 5 | – | 4 | 7 | – | 6 |
| West Virginia | 5 | – | 4 | 7 | – | 6 |
| Kansas State | 5 | – | 4 | 8 | – | 5 |
| Iowa State | 5 | – | 4 | 8 | – | 5 |
| Texas Tech | 3 | – | 6 | 6 | – | 7 |
| Baylor | 1 | – | 8 | 1 | – | 11 |
| Kansas | 0 | – | 9 | 1 | – | 11 |
Championship: Oklahoma 41, TCU 17
^ – College Football Playoff participant; $ – Conference champion; y – Championship game participant; Rankings from AP Poll

The 2017 Big 12 Championship Game was a college football game played on Saturday, December 2, 2017, at AT&T Stadium, in Arlington. This was the 16th Big 12 Championship Game and determined the 2017 champion of the Big 12 Conference. This was the first year of the current division-less format of the game; instead of representatives from two divisions, the two teams with the best conference records earned a spot in the game. The game featured the top-seeded, Oklahoma Sooners and the second-seeded, TCU Horned Frogs.

== Background ==
In the 2010 Big 12 Championship Game, the South Division was represented by Oklahoma and the North Division was represented by Nebraska. Oklahoma defeated Nebraska, 23–20, to claim their seventh Big 12 title.

The 2010–2013 realignment of the conference left the Big 12 with ten members, and NCAA regulations at the time required a conference to have at least 12 members in order to hold an "exempt" championship game that did not count against the limit of 12 regular-season contests for FBS teams. The Big 12 thus used its regular season in-conference results to determine the conference champion.

Following a January 2016 NCAA rule change that allows FBS conferences to conduct exempt football championship games regardless of their membership numbers, the Big 12 announced that the championship game would be reinstated in 2017.

== Game summary ==
2017 Big 12 Championship Game

| Quarter | 1 | 2 | 3 | 4 | Total |
|---|---|---|---|---|---|
| No. 11 TCU | 0 | 17 | 0 | 0 | 17 |
| No. 3 Oklahoma | 17 | 7 | 17 | 0 | 41 |

at AT&T Stadium • Arlington, Texas

- Date: December 2, 2017
- Game time: 11:00 a.m. CST
- Game weather: None (retractable roof closed)
- TV: Fox
- ESPN game summary

Game information

First quarter
Second quarter
Third quarter
Fourth quarter

=== Statistics ===
| Statistics | TCU | OKLA |
|---|---|---|
| First downs | 20 | 22 |
| Plays–yards | 61-234 | 66-461 |
| Rushes–yards | 24-83 | 43-218 |
| Passing yards | 234 | 243 |
| Passing: comp–att–int | 27-37-1 | 15-23-0 |
| Turnovers | | |
| Time of possession | 24:41 | 35:19 |

| Team | Category | Player | Statistics |
|---|---|---|---|
| TCU | Passing | Kenny Hill | 27-37, 234 yds, 2 TD |
| TCU | Rushing | Kenny Hill | 13 car, 51 yds, 0 TD |
| TCU | Receiving | John Diarse | 5 rec, 1 TD |
| OKLA | Passing | Baker Mayfield | 15-23, 243 yds, 4 TD |
| OKLA | Rushing | Rodney Anderson | 24 car, 93 yds, 0 TD |
| OKLA | Receiving | Marquise Brown | 7 rec, 58 yds, 2 TD |
