= Travin Howard =

American football player (born 1996)

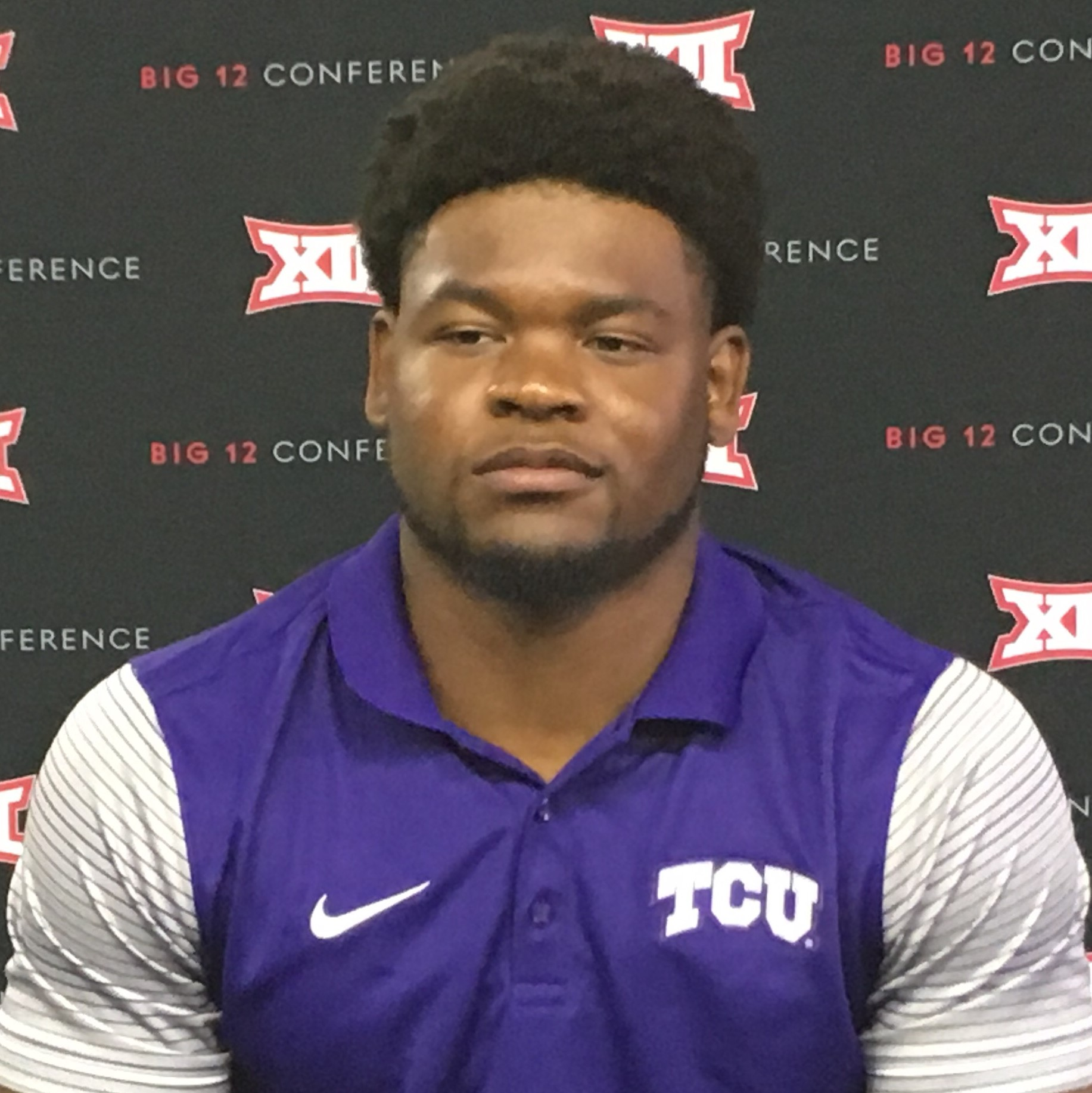
- Howard at Big 12 Media Day

Profile
- Position: Linebacker

Personal information
- Born: May 10, 1996 (age 30); Longview, Texas, U.S.
- Listed height: 6 ft 1 in (1.85 m)
- Listed weight: 219 lb (99 kg)

Career information
- High school: Longview (TX)
- College: TCU
- NFL draft: 2018: 7th round, 231st overall pick

Career history
- Los Angeles Rams (2018–2022); Buffalo Bills (2023)*; Birmingham Stallions (2024)*
- * Offseason or practice squad member only

Awards and highlights
- Super Bowl champion (LVI); 2× First-team All-Big 12 (2016, 2017)

Career NFL statistics
- Total tackles: 44
- Interceptions: 1
- Pass deflections: 6
- Stats at Pro Football Reference

Travin Howard (born May 10, 1996) is an American professional football linebacker. He played college football at TCU.

== Early life ==
Howard was born in Longview, Texas, where he played high school football at Longview High School. Playing safety, he earned District Defensive MVP honors as a senior for the Lobos in 2013. He verbally committed to play at TCU and signed his national letter of intent with the Horned Frogs on February 5, 2014.

== College career ==
At TCU, Howard played sparingly as a freshman in 2014. After the first game of his sophomore season, Howard was moved to linebacker and led the Horned Frogs in tackles the next week against Stephen F. Austin. He went on to start the next 11 games, and ended the season as the team's leading tackler. He also earned Defensive MVP honors in the Frogs' triple-overtime victory over Oregon in the 2015 Alamo Bowl.

As a full-time starter in his junior and senior seasons in Fort Worth, Howard again led the Horned Frogs in tackles, becoming the first player in program history to do so for three consecutive seasons. He was named first-team All-Big 12 Conference in both seasons and again earned Defensive MVP honors in his final collegiate game, a win over Stanford in the 2017 Alamo Bowl.

=== Statistics ===
						Tackles					Def Int					Fumbles			
Year	School	Conf	Class	Pos	G	Solo	Ast	Tot	Loss	Sk	Int	Yds	Avg	TD	PD	FR	Yds	TD	FF
*2015	TCU	Big 12	SO	S	12	64	43	107	9.5	3.0	1	4	4.0	0	1	0			3
*2016	TCU	Big 12	JR	LB	13	72	58	130	4.0	1.5	1	5	5.0	0	2	2			1
*2017	TCU	Big 12	SR	LB	12	60	48	108	7.0	1.0	1	19	19.0	1	7	0			0
Career						196	149	345	20.5	5.5	3	28	9.3	1	10	2			4

== Professional career ==
Pre-draft measurables
Height	Weight	Arm length	Hand span
5 ft 10 7/8 in (1.80 m)	211 lb (96 kg)	31 1/2 in (0.80 m)	9 in (0.23 m)
All values from NFL Combine

=== Los Angeles Rams ===
Howard was drafted by the Los Angeles Rams in the seventh round (231st overall) of the 2018 NFL draft. He was waived by the Rams on September 1, 2018. He re-signed to the team's practice squad on October 16, 2018. He signed a reserve/future contract with the Rams on February 6, 2019. On September 5, 2020, Howard was placed on injured reserve.

Howard was given an exclusive-rights free agent tender by the Rams on March 4, 2021, and signed it on March 26. On November 2, 2021, Howard was placed on injured reserve. He was activated on December 21. Against the San Francisco 49ers in the NFC Championship Game, Howard made the game-sealing interception on Jimmy Garoppolo in the final two minutes in the 20–17 win, sending the Rams to Super Bowl LVI. The Rams beat the Cincinnati Bengals 23–20.

On June 8, 2022, Howard was waived by the Rams, but was then re-signed less than a week later He was placed on the reserve/non-football injury list on August 30, 2022. He was designated to return from the reserve/non-football injury list on October 24, 2022. He was activated from the reserve/non-football injury list on November 5, 2022.

=== Buffalo Bills ===
On May 14, 2023, Howard signed with the Buffalo Bills, but was released on August 29, 2023.

=== Birmingham Stallions ===
Howard signed with the Birmingham Stallions of the United States Football League on December 2, 2023. He was released on March 10, 2024.
