= Jalen Reagor =

American football player (born 1999)

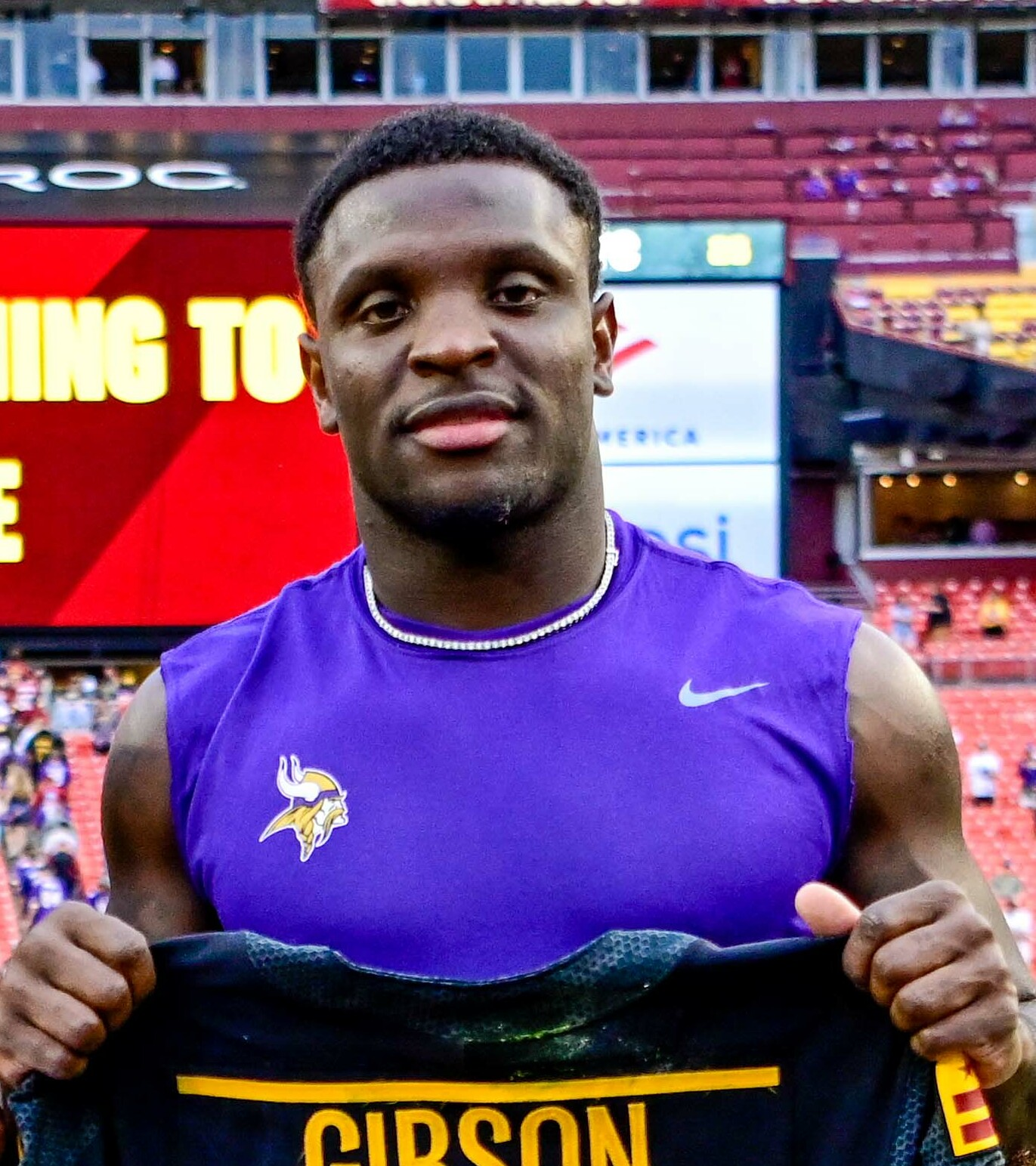
- Reagor with the Minnesota Vikings in 2022

No. 88 – Miami Dolphins
- Positions: Wide receiver, return specialist
- Roster status: Practice squad

Personal information
- Born: January 2, 1999 (age 27); Waxahachie, Texas, U.S.
- Listed height: 5 ft 11 in (1.80 m)
- Listed weight: 200 lb (91 kg)

Career information
- High school: Waxahachie
- College: TCU (2017–2019)
- NFL draft: 2020: 1st round, 21st overall pick

Career history
- Philadelphia Eagles (2020–2021); Minnesota Vikings (2022); New England Patriots (2023–2024); Los Angeles Chargers (2024–2025); Miami Dolphins (2026–present)

Awards and highlights
- Big 12 Offensive Freshman of the Year (2017); 2× second-team All-Big 12 (2018, 2019)

Career NFL statistics as of 2024
- Receptions: 86
- Receiving yards: 1,037
- Receiving touchdowns: 4
- Return yards: 986
- Return touchdowns: 2
- Stats at Pro Football Reference

Jalen Armand Reagor (born January 2, 1999) is an American professional football wide receiver and return specialist for the Miami Dolphins of the National Football League (NFL). He played college football for the TCU Horned Frogs and was selected by the Philadelphia Eagles in the first round of the 2020 NFL draft. He has also played for the Minnesota Vikings, New England Patriots, and Los Angeles Chargers.

== Early life ==
Reagor was born January 2, 1999, to Ishia Johnson and former NFL defensive end Montae Reagor. He grew up in Waxahachie, Texas and attended Waxahachie High School, where he became a star in both football and track & field for the Indians.

On the football field, Reagor produced back to back 1,000-yard receiving seasons for Waxahachie head coach and former NFL quarterback Jon Kitna and was selected to play in the 2017 Under Armour All-America Game. His track & field career culminated with a gold medal in the long jump at the 2017 Texas High School state meet.

== College career ==
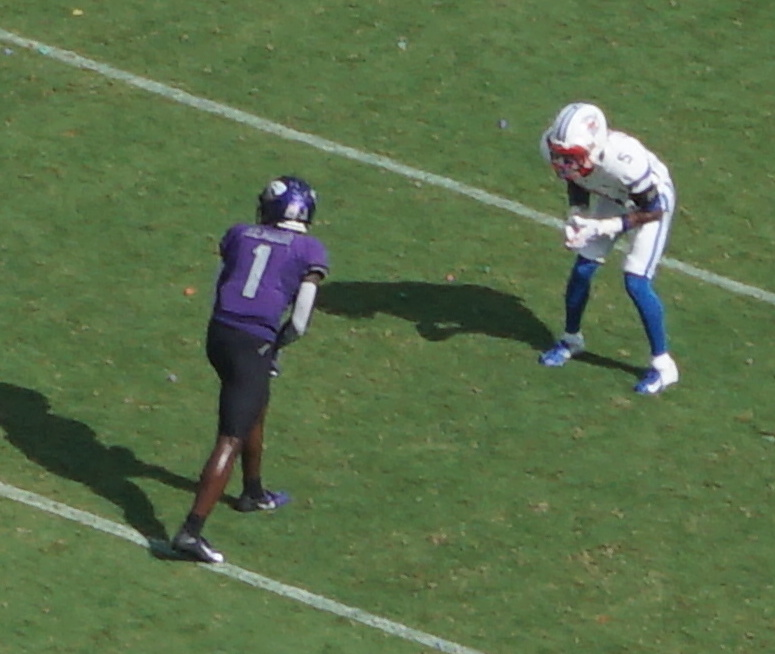
Reagor (#1) with the TCU in 2019

Reagor enrolled at Texas Christian University in Fort Worth, Texas in the summer of 2017 and made his collegiate debut in the Horned Frogs' season opener against Jackson State with two receptions in TCU's 63–0 victory. He scored his first collegiate touchdown two weeks later when he caught a Hail Mary pass from quarterback Kenny Hill on the last play of the first half in a victory over SMU. He scored touchdowns in each of the last four games of the season, which included TCU's first-ever appearance in the Big 12 Championship Game and a win in the 2017 Alamo Bowl over Stanford. For his efforts, he was named Co-Big 12 Offensive Freshman of the Year.

Prior to his sophomore season, Reagor switched to jersey number 1 from the 18 he'd worn in 2017. That fall, he became the Frogs' go-to receiver in a season in which they used three different starting quarterbacks, becoming the first TCU receiver to top 1,000 yards since Josh Doctson. He had a streak of 7 straight games with a receiving touchdown, which included a win against Oklahoma State in which he also recorded his first career 100-yard rushing game [233 total yards, 121 rushing, 91 receiving, 21 returning kickoffs]. After the season, he was named 2nd-team All-Big 12. In his 2019 season, he had 43 catches for 611 yards. Reagor declared for the 2020 NFL draft after this season, forgoing his final year of eligibility.

== Professional career ==
Pre-draft measurables
Height	Weight	Arm length	Hand span	Wingspan	40-yard dash	10-yard split	20-yard split	20-yard shuttle	Three-cone drill	Vertical jump	Broad jump	Bench press	Wonderlic
5 ft 10 5/8 in (1.79 m)	206 lb (93 kg)	31 3/8 in (0.80 m)	9 1/2 in (0.24 m)	6 ft 2 3/8 in (1.89 m)	4.47 s	1.52 s	2.68 s	4.46 s	7.31 s	42.0 in (1.07 m)	11 ft 6 in (3.51 m)	17 reps	13
All values from NFL Combine

=== Philadelphia Eagles ===
==== 2020 season ====
Reagor was selected by the Philadelphia Eagles in the first round with the 21st overall pick in the 2020 NFL draft, becoming the first wide receiver drafted in the first round from TCU since former All-American Josh Doctson in 2016. On July 20, 2020, Reagor signed a 4-year $13.3 million contract with the team, with a fifth-year team option. Reagor sustained a shoulder injury in training camp but recovered enough to play in Week 1.

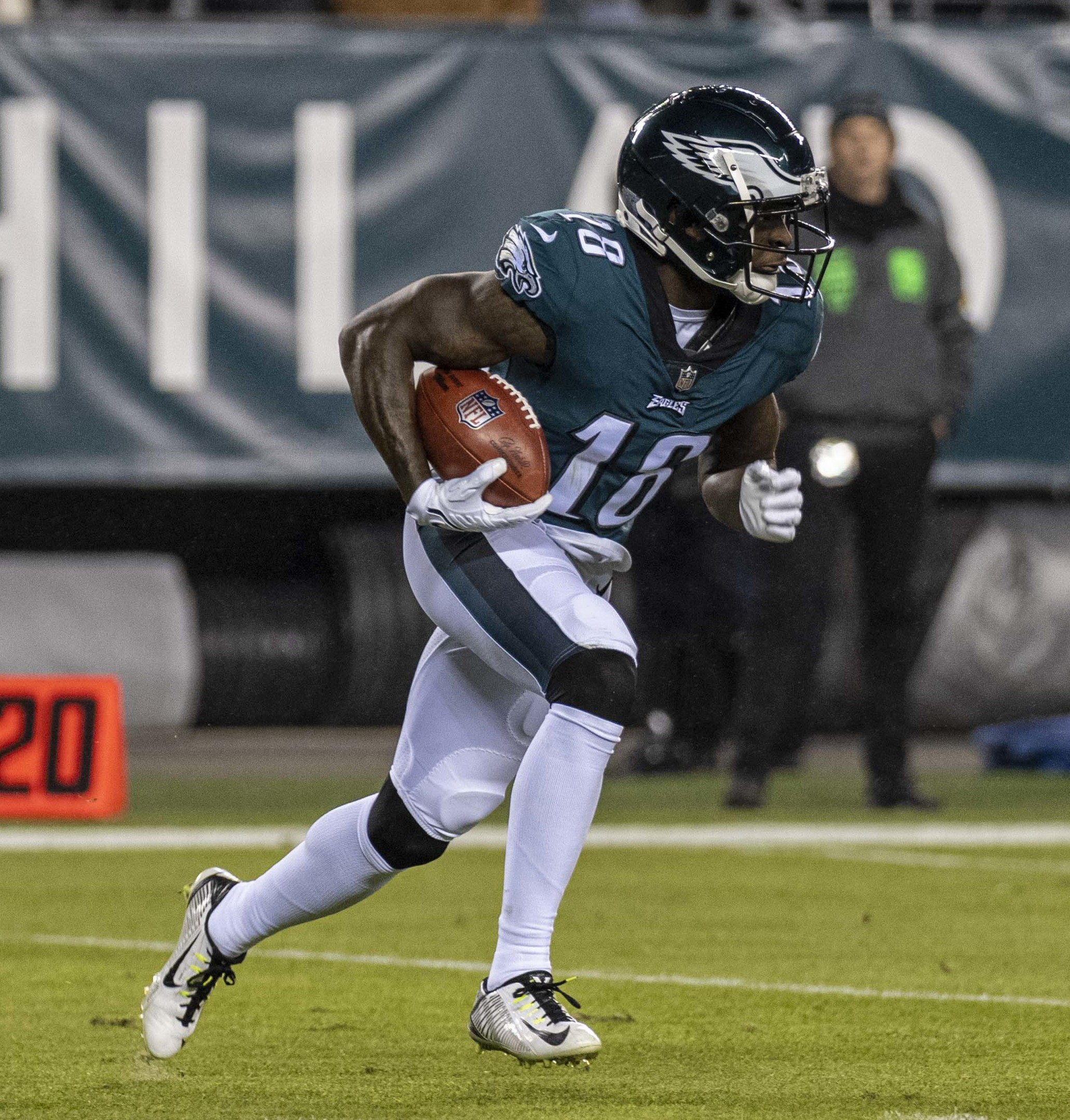
Reagor with the Eagles in 2021

On September 13, Reagor made his NFL debut against the Washington Football Team, finishing with one reception for 55 yards in the 17–27 loss. He was placed on injured reserve on September 30 after suffering a ligament tear in his thumb. Reagor was activated on October 31. In Week 8 against the Dallas Cowboys on Sunday Night Football, Reagor recorded his first career touchdown reception in the 23–9 win.

In Week 13 against the Green Bay Packers, Reagor returned a punt for a 73-yard touchdown during the 30–16 loss. This was his first career punt returned for a touchdown. He finished his rookie season with 31 receptions for 396 receiving yards and one receiving touchdown.

==== 2021 season ====
In Week 12 of the 2021 NFL season, Reagor dropped two passes, including a touchdown, in the final drive against the New York Giants in the 13–7 loss. He finished the 2021 season with 33 receptions for 299 receiving yards and two receiving touchdowns in 17 games and 13 starts.

In the Wild Card Round against the Tampa Bay Buccaneers, Reagor muffed two punts, losing one, in the Eagles' 31–15 loss.

=== Minnesota Vikings ===
On August 31, 2022, Reagor was traded to the Minnesota Vikings in exchange for the Houston Texans' 2023 seventh-round pick as well as a 2024 conditional fifth-round pick (which would have become a fourth if Reagor had 40 receptions or 500 receiving yards or 5 touchdowns in either 2022 or 2023, but neither of them happened). After the trade, Reagor decided he would change his number to 5. He stated on Twitter: "The number 5 symbolizes Spiritual growth, Self confidence, Freedom, Curiosity, and Change. #5 it is, let's go crazy!" He finished the 2022 season with eight receptions for 104 receiving yards and one receiving touchdown.

On August 30, 2023, Reagor was waived.

=== New England Patriots ===
On August 31, 2023, the New England Patriots signed Reagor to their practice squad. He was signed to the active roster on October 26. In Week 17 against the Buffalo Bills, Reagor returned the opening kickoff from Tyler Bass 98 yards for a touchdown, the first kick return touchdown of his career. He finished the 2023 season with seven receptions for 138 yards in 11 games.

On March 13, 2024, Reagor re-signed with the Patriots. He was released on August 28 and re-signed to the practice squad. He was released from the practice squad on September 17.

=== Los Angeles Chargers ===
On September 24, 2024, Reagor signed with the Los Angeles Chargers' practice squad. He was promoted to the active roster on November 6. Reagor finished the 2024 season with seven receptions for 100 yards in eight games.

On March 12, 2025, Reagor re-signed with the Chargers on a one-year contract. He was released on August 26 as part of final roster cuts and re-signed to the practice squad the following day. Reagor was released on September 10 with an injury settlement. On October 7, Reagor was re-signed to the practice squad, and released on October 18.

=== Miami Dolphins ===
On June 2, 2026, Reagor was signed by the Miami Dolphins. On August 30, Reagor was released by the Dolphins as a part of final roster cuts; he was re-signed to the team's practice squad the following day.

== Career statistics ==
=== NFL ===
==== Regular season ====
Legend
	Led the League
**Bold**	Career High

Year	Team	Games		Receiving					Rushing					Kick returns					Punt returns					Fumbles	
Year	Team	GP	GS	Rec	Yds	Avg	Lng	TD	Att	Yds	Avg	Lng	TD	Ret	Yds	Avg	Lng	TD	Ret	Yds	Avg	Lng	TD	Fum	Lost
2020	PHI	11	11	31	**396**	12.8	**55**	1	4	26	**6.5**	**19**	0	—	—	—	—	—	4	94	**23.5**	**73**	**1**	2	0
2021	PHI	**17**	**13**	**33**	299	9.1	34	**2**	**10**	**32**	3.2	12	0	**12**	**255**	21.3	44	0	**31**	**227**	7.3	39	0	2	0
2022	MIN	**17**	0	8	104	13.0	38	1	4	25	6.3	17	0	—	—	—	—	—	26	167	6.4	25	0	**4**	0
2023	NE	11	1	7	138	**19.7**	39	0	1	17	—	—	—	6	206	**34.3**	**98**	**1**	—	—	—	—	—	0	0
2024	LAC	8	2	7	100	14.3	41	0	3	-3.0	-1.0	1	0	1	22	22.0	22	—	—	—	—	—	—	1	0
Career		63	27	85	1,037	13.8	55	4	21	100	4.6	19	0	19	483	25.9	98	1	61	488	8.0	73	1	9	0

==== Playoffs ====
Year	Team	Games		Receiving					Rushing					Returning					Fumbles	
Year	Team	GP	GS	Rec	Yds	Avg	Lng	TD	Att	Yds	Avg	Lng	TD	Ret	Yds	Avg	Lng	TD	Fum	Lost
2021	PHI	1	0	1	2	2.0	2	0	—	—	—	—	—	5	45	7.0	31	0	2	1
2022	MIN	1	0	—	—	—	—	—	—	—	—	—	—	1	0	0.0	0	0	1	0
Career		2	0	1	2	2.0	2	0	0	0	0.0	0	0	6	45	7.5	31	0	3	1

=== College ===
Season	Team	GP	Receiving				Rushing				Kick returns				Punt returns			
Season	Team	GP	Rec	Yds	Avg	TD	Att	Yds	Avg	TD	Ret	Yds	Avg	TD	Ret	Yds	Avg	TD
2017	TCU	**14**	33	576	**17.5**	8	8	65	8.1	0	4	**122**	**30.5**	0	0	0	0.0	0
2018	TCU	13	**72**	**1,067**	14.8	**9**	13	**170**	**13.1**	**2**	4	121	30.3	0	8	97	12.1	0
2019	TCU	12	43	611	14.2	5	**14**	89	6.4	0	**5**	72	14.4	0	**15**	**312**	**20.8**	**1**
Total		39	148	2,248	15.2	22	35	324	9.3	2	13	315	24.2	0	23	409	17.8	1
