= Joe Noteboom =

American football player (born 1995)

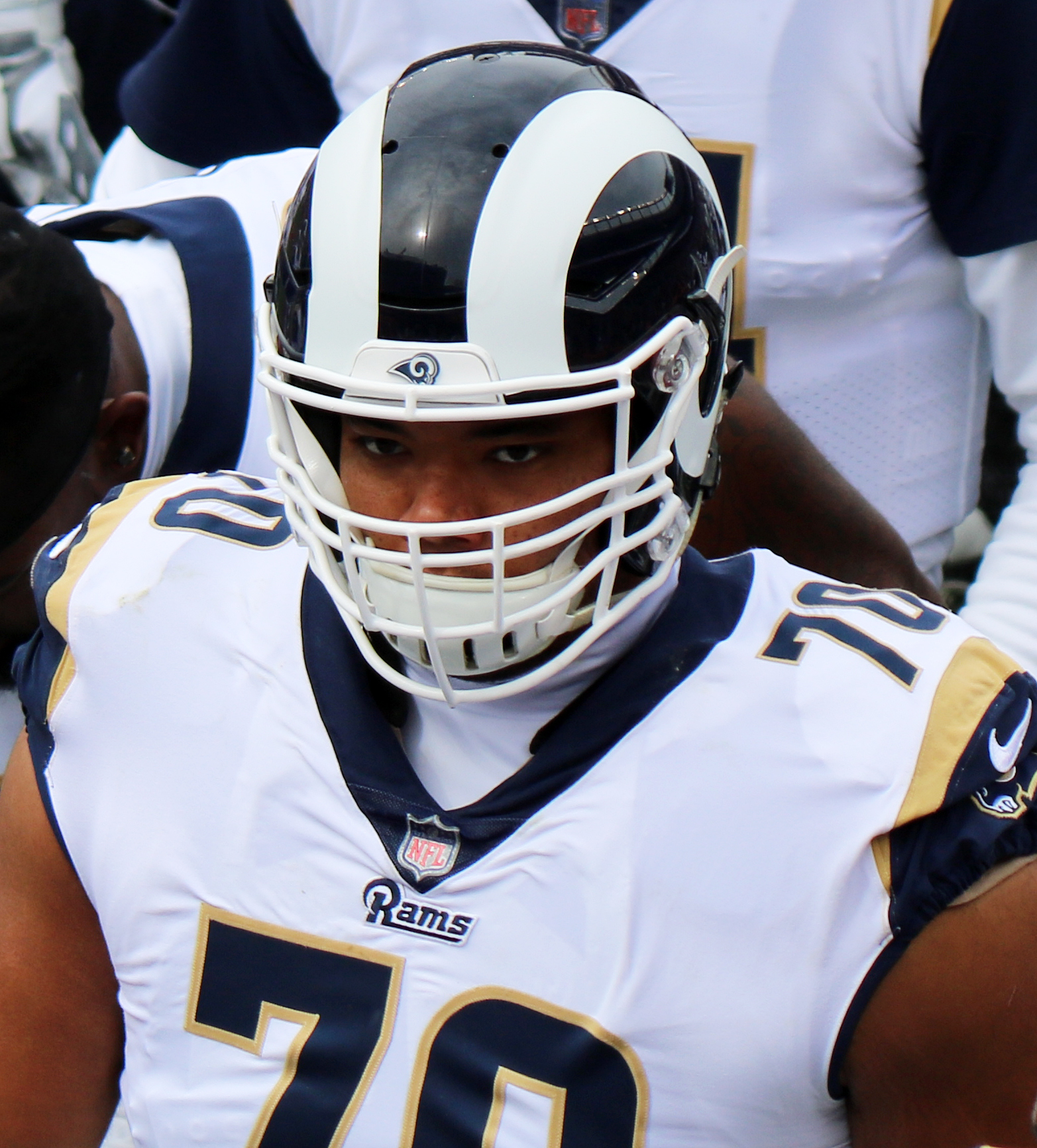
- Noteboom with the Los Angeles Rams in 2018

Profile
- Position: Offensive tackle

Personal information
- Born: June 19, 1995 (age 31); Plano, Texas, U.S.
- Listed height: 6 ft 5 in (1.96 m)
- Listed weight: 321 lb (146 kg)

Career information
- High school: Plano Senior
- College: TCU (2013–2017)
- NFL draft: 2018: 3rd round, 89th overall pick

Career history
- Los Angeles Rams (2018–2024); Baltimore Ravens (2025)

Awards and highlights
- Super Bowl champion (LVI)

Career NFL statistics as of 2025
- Games played: 81
- Games started: 36
- Stats at Pro Football Reference

Joseph Noteboom (born June 19, 1995) is an American professional football offensive tackle. He played college football at TCU.

== Early life and college ==
Noteboom was born in Plano, Texas. He attended Plano Senior High School, where he played football and ice hockey. He verbally committed to Texas Christian University in the summer before his senior year at Plano, during which he earned All-District honors for the Wildcats.

At TCU, Noteboom redshirted in his first season on campus in Fort Worth and played in 13 games as a reserve in 2014. He became the Horned Frogs' starting right tackle as a sophomore in 2015 before shifting to left tackle for his junior and senior seasons. His final collegiate game, which was also his 40th consecutive start, was a win over Stanford in the 2017 Alamo Bowl.

== Professional career ==
=== Pre-Draft ===
On January 4, 2018, it was announced that Noteboom had accepted his invitation to play in the Senior Bowl. He impressed scouts and analysts by showcasing his versatility and athleticism during Senior Bowl practices which helped raise his draft stock. On January 27, 2018, Noteboom played in the 2018 Reese's Senior Bowl and was part of Houston Texans head coach Bill O'Brien's South team that defeated Denver Broncos head coach Vance Joseph's North team 45–16. Noteboom attended the NFL Scouting Combine in Indianapolis and completed all of the combine and positional drills. His combine performance was widely considered a success among scouts due to his 40-yard dash time and displays of agility.

External videos
- Joseph Noteboom's NFL Combine Workout
- Joseph Noteboom's 40-yard dash

On March 30, 2018, Noteboom participated at TCU's pro day, but opted to stand on his combine numbers and only performed positional drills. He attended private visits and workouts with the Los Angeles Rams and Kansas City Chiefs. At the conclusion of the pre-draft process, Noteboom was projected to be a third round pick by NFL draft experts and scouts. He was ranked as the seventh best offensive tackle in the draft by Scouts Inc., was ranked the eighth best offensive tackle by DraftScout.com, and was ranked the 12th best offensive tackle in the draft by Sports Illustrated.

Pre-draft measurables
Height	Weight	Arm length	Hand span	40-yard dash	10-yard split	20-yard split	20-yard shuttle	Three-cone drill	Vertical jump	Broad jump	Bench press
6 ft 5 in (1.96 m)	309 lb (140 kg)	34 3/8 in (0.87 m)	9 5/8 in (0.24 m)	4.96 s	1.72 s	2.88 s	4.44 s	7.65 s	24 in (0.61 m)	8 ft 6 in (2.59 m)	27 reps
All values from NFL Combine

=== Los Angeles Rams ===
The Los Angeles Rams selected Noteboom in the third round (89th overall) of the 2018 NFL draft. Noteboom was the tenth offensive tackle drafted in 2018.

External videos
- Rams draft Noteboom 89th overall
- NFL Draft Profile: Joseph Noteboom

On June 9, 2018, the Rams signed Noteboom to a four-year, $3.45 million contract that includes a signing bonus of $818,892. He saw action in all 16 regular season games for the Rams as a rookie.

After spending his rookie year as a backup, Noteboom was named the starting left guard to begin the 2019 season. He started the first six games before suffering a knee injury in Week 6. It was revealed that he suffered a torn ACL and MCL and was placed on season-ending injured reserve on October 15, 2019.

Noteboom entered 2020 as the Rams' starting left guard. He was placed on injured reserve on September 24, 2020, with a calf injury. He was activated on November 14, 2020. Noteboom played in 10 games, starting nine.

In 2021, Noteboom played in all 17 regular season games (starting two) and in two playoff games. In an NFC Divisional Playoff game against the defending Super Bowl champion Tampa Bay Buccaneers, Noteboom made his only career postseason start, playing every snap at left tackle of the Rams' 30-27 victory in place of injured starter Andrew Whitworth. Noteboom became a world champion when the Rams defeated the Cincinnati Bengals 23–20 in Super Bowl LVI.

On March 14, 2022, Noteboom signed a three-year, $40 million contract extension with the Rams and was elevated to starting left tackle in place of the retired Whitworth. He started the sesaon's first six games and was placed on injured reserve on October 18, 2022 after suffering a torn Achilles tendon in Week 6. In the 2023 season, he appeared in 14 games and started eight.

To start the 2024 season, Noteboom suffered an ankle injury in the Week 1 loss against the Detroit Lions and was placed on injured reserve on September 11, 2024. He was activated on November 5 and started three more games during the second half of the Rams' season.

In seven seasons with the Los Angeles Rams, Noteboom appeared in 71 regular games and started 35, while also taking part in seven playoff games with one postseason start.

=== Baltimore Ravens ===
On May 3, 2025, Noteboom signed with the Baltimore Ravens. He appeared in 10 games during the regular season and made one start at left tackle in Week 5, a 44-10 loss to the Houston Texans.
