= 2017 Kansas State Wildcats football team =

American college football season

2017 Kansas State Wildcats football

Cactus Bowl champion

Cactus Bowl, W 35–17 vs. UCLA
- Conference: Big 12 Conference
- Record: 8–5 (5–4 Big 12)
- Head coach: Bill Snyder (26th season)
- Offensive coordinator: Dana Dimel (11th season)
- Offensive scheme: Multiple
- Defensive coordinator: Tom Hayes (6th season)
- Base defense: 4–3
- Home stadium: Bill Snyder Family Football Stadium

2017 Big 12 Conference football standings
	Conf.			Overall
Team	W		L	W		L
No. 3 Oklahoma y$^	8	–	1	12	–	2
No. 9 TCU y	7	–	2	11	–	3
No. 14 Oklahoma State	6	–	3	10	–	3
Texas	5	–	4	7	–	6
West Virginia	5	–	4	7	–	6
Kansas State	5	–	4	8	–	5
Iowa State	5	–	4	8	–	5
Texas Tech	3	–	6	6	–	7
Baylor	1	–	8	1	–	11
Kansas	0	–	9	1	–	11
Championship: Oklahoma 41, TCU 17
^ – College Football Playoff participant; $ – Conference champion; y – Championship game participant; Rankings from AP Poll

The 2017 Kansas State Wildcats football team represented Kansas State University in the 2017 NCAA Division I FBS football season. The Wildcats played their home games at the Bill Snyder Family Football Stadium in Manhattan, Kansas, and competed in the Big 12 Conference. They were led by 26th-year head coach Bill Snyder. They finished the season 8–5, 5–4 in Big 12 play to finish in a four-way tie for fourth place. They were invited to the Cactus Bowl where they defeated UCLA.

== Season ==
=== Pre Season ===
In January 2017 it was reported by many Kansas media outlets that Bill Snyder has been traveling to Houston, Texas for treatment for a "serious life-threatening ailment". On February 12, 2017 Snyder announced that he has been diagnosed with throat cancer and had been receiving treatment in Manhattan, as well at University of Kansas Medical Center, and in Houston, Texas. He said that his doctor expect a recovery and that he should be able to coach by the 2017 Wildcats Spring Game. Also on February 12, 2017 it was announced that Co-offensive Coordinator Del Miller would be retiring, putting the other Co-offensive Coordinator Dana Dimel at the helm as the only OC and play caller for KSU, and Collin Klein would return to KSU to take over the Quarterback Coach position.

=== End Of Season ===
On December 6, 2017 it was announced that offensive coordinator Dana Dimel was hired as the new head coach for UTEP. It was also said that he will be fulfilling his final OC duties for KSU while participating in the Cactus Bowl.

== Schedule ==
Kansas State announced its 2017 football schedule on December 13, 2016. The 2017 schedule consisted of seven home and five away games in the regular season. The Wildcats hosted Big 12 foes Baylor, Iowa State, Oklahoma, TCU, and West Virginia, and traveled to Kansas, Oklahoma State, Texas, and Texas Tech.

The Wildcats hosted two of the three non-conference opponents, Central Arkansas from the Southland Conference and Charlotte from Conference USA and traveled to Vanderbilt from the Southeastern Conference.

The team accepted the bowl bid to participate in the Cactus Bowl and faced UCLA in a bowl game for the second time. The first bowl meeting was in the Alamo Bowl with UCLA winning 40–35.

Date	Time	Opponent	Rank	Site	TV	Result	Attendance
September 2	6:10 p.m.	No. 15 (FCS) Central Arkansas*	No. 20	Bill Snyder Family Football Stadium; Manhattan, KS	ESPN3	W 55–19	51,043
September 9	11:00 a.m.	Charlotte*	No. 19	Bill Snyder Family Football Stadium; Manhattan, KS	FSN	W 55–7	50,087
September 16	6:30 p.m.	at Vanderbilt*	No. 18	Vanderbilt Stadium; Nashville, TN	ESPNU	L 7–14	40,350
September 30	2:30 p.m.	Baylor		Bill Snyder Family Football Stadium; Manhattan, KS	ESPN2	W 33–20	52,293
October 7	6:00 p.m.	at Texas		Darrell K Royal–Texas Memorial Stadium; Austin, TX	FS1	L 34–40 ^{2OT}	90,462
October 14	11:00 a.m.	No. 6 TCU		Bill Snyder Family Football Stadium; Manhattan, KS	FS1	L 6–26	52,055
October 21	3:00 p.m.	No. 9 Oklahoma^{†}		Bill Snyder Family Football Stadium; Manhattan, KS	FOX	L 35–42	52,122
October 28	2:00 p.m.	at Kansas		Memorial Stadium; Lawrence, KS (rivalry)	FS1	W 30–20	36,223
November 4	11:00 a.m.	at Texas Tech		Jones AT&T Stadium; Lubbock, TX	FS1	W 42–35 ^{OT}	47,631
November 11	2:30 p.m.	West Virginia		Bill Snyder Family Football Stadium; Manhattan, KS	ESPN2	L 23–28	51,223
November 18	2:30 p.m.	at No. 10 Oklahoma State		Boone Pickens Stadium; Stillwater, OK	ESPN2	W 45–40	56,790
November 25	2:30 p.m.	Iowa State		Bill Snyder Family Football Stadium; Manhattan, KS (rivalry)	ESPN2	W 20–19	49,554
December 26	8:00 p.m.	vs. UCLA*		Chase Field; Phoenix, AZ (Cactus Bowl)	ESPN	W 35–17	32,859
*Non-conference game; ^{†}Homecoming; Rankings from AP Poll released prior to the game; All times are in Central time

== Rankings ==
Ranking movements Legend: ██ Increase in ranking ██ Decrease in ranking — = Not ranked RV = Received votes
	Week															
Poll	Pre	1	2	3	4	5	6	7	8	9	10	11	12	13	14	Final
AP	20	19	18	RV	RV	RV	RV	—	—	—	—	—	—	RV	RV	—
Coaches	19	19	18	RV	RV	RV	RV	—	—	—	—	—	—	—	—	—
CFP	Not released									—	—	—	—	—	—	Not released
