= 2017 Baylor Bears football team =

American college football season

2017 Baylor Bears football
- Conference: Big 12 Conference
- Record: 1–11 (1–8 Big 12)
- Head coach: Matt Rhule (1st season)
- Co-offensive coordinators: Glenn Thomas (1st season); Jeff Nixon (1st season)
- Offensive scheme: Spread
- Defensive coordinator: Phil Snow (1st season)
- Base defense: 3–3 stack
- Home stadium: McLane Stadium

2017 Big 12 Conference football standings
	Conf.			Overall
Team	W		L	W		L
No. 3 Oklahoma y$^	8	–	1	12	–	2
No. 9 TCU y	7	–	2	11	–	3
No. 14 Oklahoma State	6	–	3	10	–	3
Texas	5	–	4	7	–	6
West Virginia	5	–	4	7	–	6
Kansas State	5	–	4	8	–	5
Iowa State	5	–	4	8	–	5
Texas Tech	3	–	6	6	–	7
Baylor	1	–	8	1	–	11
Kansas	0	–	9	1	–	11
Championship: Oklahoma 41, TCU 17
^ – College Football Playoff participant; $ – Conference champion; y – Championship game participant; Rankings from AP Poll

The 2017 Baylor Bears football team represented Baylor University in the 2017 NCAA Division I FBS football season. The Bears played their home games at the McLane Stadium in Waco, Texas and competed in the Big 12 Conference. They were led by first-year head coach Matt Rhule. They finished the season 1–11 (1–8 in-conference) to finish in ninth place in the Big 12.

The Baylor Bears football team drew an average home attendance of 43,830, down from 45,838 in 2016.

== Recruiting ==
=== Recruits ===
Baylor signed a total of 27 recruits.

College recruiting (2017)
Name	Hometown	School	Height	Weight	Commit date
Jalen Pitre; S	Stafford, Texas	Stafford HS	6 ft 0 in (1.83 m)	197 lb (89 kg)	Jul 24, 2015
Jalen Pitre; S	Recruit ratings: Scout: Rivals: 247Sports: ESPN:				
Trevon Lewis; S	Houston, Texas	Lamar HS	6 ft 0 in (1.83 m)	180 lb (82 kg)	Dec 28, 2016
Trevon Lewis; S	Recruit ratings: Scout: Rivals: 247Sports: ESPN:				
Timarcus Davis; CB	College Station, Texas	College Station HS	5 ft 11 in (1.80 m)	165 lb (75 kg)	Dec 31, 2016
Timarcus Davis; CB	Recruit ratings: Scout: Rivals: 247Sports: ESPN:				
Charlie Brewer; QB	Austin, Texas	Lake Travis HS	6 ft 1 in (1.85 m)	188 lb (85 kg)	Dec 31, 2016
Charlie Brewer; QB	Recruit ratings: Scout: Rivals: 247Sports: ESPN:				
James Lynch; DT	Round Rock, Texas	Round Rock HS	6 ft 5 in (1.96 m)	282 lb (128 kg)	Jan 4, 2017
James Lynch; DT	Recruit ratings: Scout: Rivals: 247Sports: ESPN:				
Abram Smith; RB	Abilene, Texas	Abilene HS	6 ft 0 in (1.83 m)	196 lb (89 kg)	Jan 5, 2017
Abram Smith; RB	Recruit ratings: Scout: Rivals: 247Sports: ESPN:				
RJ Sneed; WR	Cypress, Texas	Cypress Ranch HS	6 ft 2 in (1.88 m)	180 lb (82 kg)	Jan 7, 2017
RJ Sneed; WR	Recruit ratings: Scout: Rivals: 247Sports: ESPN:				
Harrison Hand; CB	Cherry Hill, New Jersey	Cherry Hill HS West	6 ft 0 in (1.83 m)	183 lb (83 kg)	Jan 7, 2017
Harrison Hand; CB	Recruit ratings: Scout: Rivals: 247Sports: ESPN:				
Jason Moore; OT	Frisco, Texas	Independence HS	6 ft 4 in (1.93 m)	275 lb (125 kg)	Jan 15, 2017
Jason Moore; OT	Recruit ratings: Scout: Rivals: 247Sports: ESPN:				
Eleasah Anderson; OG	Houston, Texas	Alief Taylor HS	6 ft 4 in (1.93 m)	280 lb (130 kg)	Jan 15, 2017
Eleasah Anderson; OG	Recruit ratings: Scout: Rivals: 247Sports: ESPN:				
Trestan Ebner; WR	Henderson, Texas	Henderson HS	6 ft 0 in (1.83 m)	188 lb (85 kg)	Jan 15, 2017
Trestan Ebner; WR	Recruit ratings: Scout: Rivals: 247Sports: ESPN:				
Xavier Newman-Johnson; OC	DeSoto, Texas	DeSoto HS	6 ft 3 in (1.91 m)	272 lb (123 kg)	Jan 15, 2017
Xavier Newman-Johnson; OC	Recruit ratings: Scout: Rivals: 247Sports: ESPN:				
Ashton Logan; S	Temple, Texas	Temple HS	6 ft 1 in (1.85 m)	203 lb (92 kg)	Jan 18, 2017
Ashton Logan; S	Recruit ratings: Scout: Rivals: 247Sports: ESPN:				
Terrel Bernard; LB	La Porte, Texas	La Porte HS	6 ft 1 in (1.85 m)	200 lb (91 kg)	Jan 18, 2017
Terrel Bernard; LB	Recruit ratings: Scout: Rivals: 247Sports: ESPN:				
Rob Saulin; DE	Pennsville, New Jersey	Memorial HS	6 ft 6 in (1.98 m)	240 lb (110 kg)	Jan 22, 2017
Rob Saulin; DE	Recruit ratings: Scout: Rivals: 247Sports: ESPN:				
Khahil Keith; OT	Alpine, Alabama	Winterboro HS	6 ft 5 in (1.96 m)	293 lb (133 kg)	Jan 22, 2017
Khahil Keith; OT	Recruit ratings: Scout: Rivals: 247Sports: ESPN:				
Cole Maxwell; DE	Allen, Texas	Allen HS	6 ft 5 in (1.96 m)	225 lb (102 kg)	Jan 22, 2017
Cole Maxwell; DE	Recruit ratings: Scout: Rivals: 247Sports: ESPN:				
Henry Klinge; OG	Southlake, Texas	Carroll HS	6 ft 5 in (1.96 m)	295 lb (134 kg)	Jan 22, 2017
Henry Klinge; OG	Recruit ratings: Scout: Rivals: 247Sports: ESPN:				
Bryson Jackson; LB	Mansfield, Texas	Lake Ridge HS	6 ft 2 in (1.88 m)	195 lb (88 kg)	Jan 22, 2017
Bryson Jackson; LB	Recruit ratings: Scout: Rivals: 247Sports: ESPN:				
Gavin Holmes; WR	Justin, Texas	Northwest HS	5 ft 11 in (1.80 m)	178 lb (81 kg)	Jan 22, 2017
Gavin Holmes; WR	Recruit ratings: Scout: Rivals: 247Sports: ESPN:				
Chidi Ogbonnaya; DE	Houston, Texas	Langham Creek HS	6 ft 5 in (1.96 m)	245 lb (111 kg)	Jan 26, 2017
Chidi Ogbonnaya; DE	Recruit ratings: Scout: Rivals: 247Sports: ESPN:				
Ryan Miller; C	Southlake, Texas	Carroll HS	6 ft 2 in (1.88 m)	270 lb (120 kg)	Jan 29, 2017
Ryan Miller; C	Recruit ratings: Scout: Rivals: 247Sports: ESPN:				
Tyler Henderson; TE	Kyle, Texas	Lehman HS	6 ft 4 in (1.93 m)	225 lb (102 kg)	Jan 29, 2017
Tyler Henderson; TE	Recruit ratings: Scout: Rivals: 247Sports: ESPN:				
Johnathan Lovett; RB	Marlton, New Jersey	Cherokee HS	6 ft 1 in (1.85 m)	190 lb (86 kg)	Jan 30, 2017
Johnathan Lovett; RB	Recruit ratings: Scout: Rivals: 247Sports: ESPN:				
DeMarco Artis; DE	Sanford, Florida	Seminole HS	6 ft 3 in (1.91 m)	220 lb (100 kg)	Jan 31, 2017
DeMarco Artis; DE	Recruit ratings: Scout: Rivals: 247Sports: ESPN:				
B.J. Thompson; DE	England, Arkansas	England HS	6 ft 6 in (1.98 m)	210 lb (95 kg)	Feb 1, 2017
B.J. Thompson; DE	Recruit ratings: Scout: Rivals: 247Sports: ESPN:				
Justin Harris; DE	Gonzales, Louisiana	East Ascension HS	6 ft 6 in (1.98 m)	250 lb (110 kg)	Feb 1, 2017
Justin Harris; DE	Recruit ratings: Scout: Rivals: 247Sports: ESPN:				
Overall recruit ranking:
Note: In many cases, Scout, Rivals, 247Sports, On3, and ESPN may conflict in their listings of height and weight.; In these cases, the average was taken. ESPN grades are on a 100-point scale.; Sources: "Baylor Football Commitments". Rivals.; "2017 Baylor Football Commits". Scout.; "ESPN". ESPN.; "Scout.com Team Recruiting Rankings". Scout.; "2017 Team Ranking". Rivals.com.

== Schedule ==
Baylor announced its 2017 football schedule on December 13, 2016. The 2017 schedule consisted of 6 home, 5 away and 1 neutral site game in the regular season. The Bears hosted Big 12 foes Iowa State, Oklahoma, Texas, and West Virginia, and will travel to Kansas, Kansas State, Oklahoma State, and TCU. Baylor played Texas Tech for the seventh season in a row in Arlington, Texas.

The Bears hosted two of the three non-conference opponents, Liberty from the Big South Conference and UTSA from Conference USA and travel to Duke from the Atlantic Coast Conference.

Date	Time	Opponent	Site	TV	Result	Attendance
September 2	6:00 p.m.	Liberty*	McLane Stadium; Waco, TX	FS2	L 45–48	45,784
September 9	6:00 p.m.	UTSA*	McLane Stadium; Waco, TX	FSN	L 10–17	41,923
September 16	11:30 a.m.	at Duke*	Wallace Wade Stadium; Durham, NC	ACCRSN	L 20–34	26,714
September 23	5:30 p.m.	No. 3 Oklahoma	McLane Stadium; Waco, TX	FS1	L 41–49	43,573
September 30	2:30 p.m.	at Kansas State	Bill Snyder Family Football Stadium; Manhattan, KS	ESPN2	L 20–33	52,293
October 14	2:30 p.m.	at No. 14 Oklahoma State	Boone Pickens Stadium; Stillwater, OK	FS1	L 16–59	56,790
October 21	7:00 p.m.	No. 23 West Virginia^{†}	McLane Stadium; Waco, TX	FS2	L 36–38	45,389
October 28	11:00 a.m.	Texas	McLane Stadium; Waco, TX (rivalry)	ESPNU	L 7–38	45,656
November 4	11:00 a.m.	at Kansas	Memorial Stadium; Lawrence, KS	FSN	W 38–9	21,797
November 11	11:00 a.m.	vs. Texas Tech	AT&T Stadium; Arlington, TX (rivalry)	FSN	L 24–38	34,482
November 18	1:30 p.m.	Iowa State	McLane Stadium; Waco, TX	FSN	L 13–23	40,653
November 24	11:30 a.m.	at No. 10 TCU	Amon G. Carter Stadium; Fort Worth, TX (rivalry)	FS1	L 22–45	43,015
*Non-conference game; ^{†}Homecoming; Rankings from AP Poll released prior to game; All times are in Central time

Schedule source:

== Roster ==
2017 Baylor Bears football team roster
Players
Coaches
Offense

Pos.	#	Name	Class
WR	6	Trevor White	Jr
RB	7	John Lovett	Fr
QB	8	Zach Smith	So
QB	12	Charlie Brewer	Fr
QB	12	Anu Solomon	Sr
WR	13	Tony Nicholson	So
WR	14	Chris Platt	Jr
WR	15	Denzel Mims	So
WR	16	Jared Atkinson	So
QB	16	Preston Heard	So
QB	17	Garret McGuire	Fr
WR	17	Pooh Stricklin	So
WR	18	Gavin Holmes	Fr
QB	18	Zack Bennema	So
WR	19	R.J. Sneed	Fr
WR	21	Blake Lynch	So
RB	22	Terence Williams	Jr
RB	23	Obim Okeke	So
TE	24	Ishmail Wainright	Sr
RB	25	Trestan Ebner	Fr
RB	28	Abram Smith	Fr
RB	30	Wyatt Schrepfer	Jr
RB	33	JaMycal Hasty	So
WR	34	Marques Jones	So
RB	35	Dwyer Bucey	So
RB	40	Jonathan Hockman	Sr
RB	44	Dru Dixon	Fr
FB	47	Kyle Boyd	So
OL	52	Sam Tecklenburg	So
OL	55	Xavier Newman-Johnson	Fr
OL	56	Tyrae Simmons	Sr
OL	57	Jason Moore	Fr
OL	58	Ty Smith	Fr
OL	61	Khalil Keith	Fr
OL	62	Dalton Justice	So
OL	63	Daniel Russell	Sr
OL	64	Ryan Miller	Fr
OL	65	Christian Beard	Jr
OL	69	Josh Malin	Jr
OL	71	Jim Threet	Fr
OL	72	Blake Blackmar	Jr
OL	75	Eleasah Anderson	Fr
OL	76	Mo Porter	Sr
OL	77	Patrick Lawrence	Jr
OL	78	Henry Klinge III	Fr
OL	79	Jake Fruhmorgen	Jr
WR	80	Tyler Jaynes	Sr
WR	81	Blake Murphy	Sr
TE	82	Tyler Henderson	Fr
WR	83	Russell Morrison	Fr
WR	84	Jalen Hurd	Sr
TE	85	Jordan Feuerbacher	Sr
TE	86	Rob Saulin	Fr
TE	87	Jayson Clements	Jr
WR	88	Quan Jones	Sr

Defense

Pos.	#	Name	Class
LB	1	Taylor Young	Sr
S	2	Taion Sells	Sr
S	3	Chris Miller	So
CB	4	Grayland Arnold	So
DE	5	Brian Nance	Sr
DT	9	Ira Lewis	Jr
CB	11	Jameson Houston	So
S	12	Davion Hall	Sr
CB	13	Raleigh Texada	Fr
LB	15	Eric Ogor	So
S	18	Chance Waz	Sr
CB	19	Niko Harrell	So
S	20	Rajah Preciado	So
CB	22	Jordan Tolbert	So
LB	24	Jalen Pitre	Fr
LB	26	Terrel Bernard	Fr
S	27	Verkedric Vaughns	Jr
LB	28	Henry Black	So
S	29	Jarrod Koym	Jr
S	30	Tre'von Lewis	Fr
CB	31	Harrison Hand	Fr
LB	32	Lenoy Jones Jr.	So
DE	33	DJ Artis	Fr
CB	35	Ezekiel Brown	Fr
LB	36	Allen Anderson	Fr
CB	37	Timarcus Davis	Fr
LB	38	Jordan Williams	So
S	39	John Arthur	Fr
DL	40	Deonte Williams	Jr
S	41	Connor Stanton	Fr
S	42	Jairon McVea	Fr
DE	43	Jamie Jacobs	Jr
LB	44	Clay Johnston	So
LB	45	Bryson Jackson	Jr
DE	48	BJ Thompson	Fr
LB	49	Chad Kelly	Fr
LB	50	Ashton Logan	Fr
DE	52	Greg Roberts	Jr
DL	54	Will Jones	Jr
DE	55	James Lockhart	Jr
DE	56	K.J. Smith	Sr
LB	57	Iain Hunter	Sr
LB	58	Michael McNair	Fr
LB	59	Koby Bullard	So
DT	73	Chidi Ogbonnaya	Fr
DT	78	Cody George	So
DE	90	Tyrone Hunt	So
DE	91	Andrew Morris	Jr
DT	92	Micheal Johnson	So
DT	93	James Lynch	Fr
DE	94	Xavier Jones	Sr
DE	96	Cole Maxwell	Fr
DE	98	Justin Harris	Fr
DT	99	Bravvion Roy	So

Special teams

Pos.	#	Name	Class
P/K	36	Drew Galitz	Jr
K	89	Jay Sedwick	Fr
K	95	Peter Webster	So
K/P	96	Connor Martin	So
LS	41	Clint Kelly	Jr
LS	46	Ross Matiscik	So
LS	51	Chris Lutzel	So
LS	67	Thor Rodoni	So

Head coach

- Matt Rhule

Coordinators/assistant coaches

- Phil Snow – Defensive coordinator
- Jeff Nixon – Co-offensive coordinator / Running backs
- Fran Brown – Assistant head coach / defensive backs
- George DeLeone – Offensive line
- Joey McGuire – Tight ends
- Elijah Robinson – Defensive line
- Mike Siravo – Linebackers / recruiting coordniator
- Glenn Thomas – Quarterbacks
- Bob Bicknell – Wide receivers
- Shawn Bell – Analyst

Legend

- (C) Team captain
- (S) Suspended
- (I) Ineligible
- Injured
- Redshirt

Roster
