= 2017 Texas Longhorns football team =

American college football season

2017 Texas Longhorns football

Texas Bowl champion

Texas Bowl, W 33–16 vs. Missouri
- Conference: Big 12 Conference
- Record: 7–6 (5–4 Big 12)
- Head coach: Tom Herman (1st season)
- Offensive coordinator: Tim Beck (1st season)
- Offensive scheme: Spread
- Defensive coordinator: Todd Orlando (1st season)
- Base defense: 3–4
- Home stadium: Darrell K Royal–Texas Memorial Stadium

2017 Big 12 Conference football standings
	Conf.			Overall
Team	W		L	W		L
No. 3 Oklahoma y$^	8	–	1	12	–	2
No. 9 TCU y	7	–	2	11	–	3
No. 14 Oklahoma State	6	–	3	10	–	3
Texas	5	–	4	7	–	6
West Virginia	5	–	4	7	–	6
Kansas State	5	–	4	8	–	5
Iowa State	5	–	4	8	–	5
Texas Tech	3	–	6	6	–	7
Baylor	1	–	8	1	–	11
Kansas	0	–	9	1	–	11
Championship: Oklahoma 41, TCU 17
^ – College Football Playoff participant; $ – Conference champion; y – Championship game participant; Rankings from AP Poll

The 2017 Texas Longhorns football team, known variously as "Texas", "UT", the "Longhorns", or the "Horns", was a collegiate American football team representing the University of Texas at Austin as a member of the Big 12 Conference in the 2017 NCAA Division I FBS football season; the 2017 team was the 125th to represent the university in college football. The Longhorns were led by first-year head coach Tom Herman with Tim Beck as the team's offensive coordinator and Todd Orlando as the team's defensive coordinator. The team played its home games at Darrell K Royal–Texas Memorial Stadium in Austin, Texas.

Following a 5–7 season the previous year, the 2017 preseason involved a complete overhaul of the coaching staff for the Texas Longhorns football team. On November 27, 2016, Houston head coach Tom Herman was hired as the Longhorns head coach, replacing Charlie Strong.

== Recruiting ==
=== Position key ===
Back	B	Center	C	Cornerback	CB	Defensive back	DB
Defensive end	DE	Defensive lineman	DL	Defensive tackle	DT	End	E
Fullback	FB	Guard	G	Halfback	HB	Kicker	K
Kickoff returner	KR	Offensive tackle	OT	Offensive lineman	OL	Linebacker	LB
Long snapper	LS	Punter	P	Punt returner	PR	Quarterback	QB
Running back	RB	Safety	S	Tight end	TE	Wide receiver	WR

=== Recruits ===
Texas signed a total of 18 recruits.

College recruiting information (2017)
Name	Hometown	School	Height	Weight	Commit date
Damion Miller; WR	Tyler, Texas	John Tyler HS	6 ft 1 in (1.85 m)	193 lb (88 kg)	Jun 25, 2015
Damion Miller; WR	Recruit ratings: Scout: Rivals: 247Sports: ESPN:				
Sam Ehlinger; QB	Austin, Texas	Westlake HS	6 ft 1 in (1.85 m)	207 lb (94 kg)	Jul 28, 2015
Sam Ehlinger; QB	Recruit ratings: Scout: Rivals: 247Sports: ESPN:				
Kobe Boyce; CB	Lake Dallas, Texas	Lake Dallas HS	6 ft 0 in (1.83 m)	163 lb (74 kg)	Apr 3, 2016
Kobe Boyce; CB	Recruit ratings: Scout: Rivals: 247Sports: ESPN:				
Montrell Estell; WR	Hooks, Texas	Hooks HS	6 ft 2 in (1.88 m)	180 lb (82 kg)	May 20, 2016
Montrell Estell; WR	Recruit ratings: Scout: Rivals: 247Sports: ESPN:				
Josh Thompson; CB	Nacogdoches, Texas	Nacogdoches HS	6 ft 0 in (1.83 m)	182 lb (83 kg)	Jul 27, 2016
Josh Thompson; CB	Recruit ratings: Scout: Rivals: 247Sports: ESPN:				
Ta'Quon Graham; DE	Temple, Texas	Temple HS	6 ft 3 in (1.91 m)	255 lb (116 kg)	Sep 5, 2016
Ta'Quon Graham; DE	Recruit ratings: Scout: Rivals: 247Sports: ESPN:				
Josh Rowland; K	Madison, Mississippi	Mississippi Gulf Coast C.C.	5 ft 10 in (1.78 m)	180 lb (82 kg)	Dec 11, 2016
Josh Rowland; K	Recruit ratings: Scout: Rivals: 247Sports: ESPN:				
Toneil Carter; RB	Houston, Texas	Langham Creek HS	5 ft 11 in (1.80 m)	197 lb (89 kg)	Dec 19, 2016
Toneil Carter; RB	Recruit ratings: Scout: Rivals: 247Sports: ESPN:				
Daniel Young; RB	Houston, Texas	Westfield HS	6 ft 0 in (1.83 m)	210 lb (95 kg)	Dec 23, 2016
Daniel Young; RB	Recruit ratings: Scout: Rivals: 247Sports: ESPN:				
Cade Brewer; TE	Austin, Texas	Lake Travis HS	6 ft 3 in (1.91 m)	223 lb (101 kg)	Dec 23, 2016
Cade Brewer; TE	Recruit ratings: Scout: Rivals: 247Sports: ESPN:				
Derek Kerstetter; OG	San Antonio, Texas	Reagan HS	6 ft 5 in (1.96 m)	280 lb (130 kg)	Dec 26, 2016
Derek Kerstetter; OG	Recruit ratings: Scout: Rivals: 247Sports: ESPN:				
Reese Leitao; TE	Jenks, Oklahoma	Jenks HS	6 ft 4 in (1.93 m)	234 lb (106 kg)	Dec 29, 2016
Reese Leitao; TE	Recruit ratings: Scout: Rivals: 247Sports: ESPN:				
Marqez Bimage; LB	Brenham, Texas	Brenham HS	6 ft 3 in (1.91 m)	233 lb (106 kg)	Jan 6, 2017
Marqez Bimage; LB	Recruit ratings: Scout: Rivals: 247Sports: ESPN:				
Max Cummins; DE	Fort Worth, Texas	All Saints Episcopal School	6 ft 6 in (1.98 m)	255 lb (116 kg)	Jan 17, 2017
Max Cummins; DE	Recruit ratings: Scout: Rivals: 247Sports: ESPN:				
Gary Johnson; LB	Douglas, Alabama	Dodge City C.C.	6 ft 1 in (1.85 m)	225 lb (102 kg)	Jan 20, 2017
Gary Johnson; LB	Recruit ratings: Scout: Rivals: 247Sports: ESPN:				
Sam Cosmi; OT	Humble, Texas	Atascocita HS	6 ft 5 in (1.96 m)	260 lb (120 kg)	Jan 30, 2017
Sam Cosmi; OT	Recruit ratings: Scout: Rivals: 247Sports: ESPN:				
Jordan Pouncey; WR	Winter Park, Florida	Winter Park HS	6 ft 2 in (1.88 m)	185 lb (84 kg)	Feb 1, 2017
Jordan Pouncey; WR	Recruit ratings: Scout: Rivals: 247Sports: ESPN:				
Jamari Chisholm; DT	Valdosta, Georgia	Northeastern Oklahoma A&M College	6 ft 5 in (1.96 m)	280 lb (130 kg)	Feb 1, 2017
Jamari Chisholm; DT	Recruit ratings: Scout: Rivals: 247Sports: ESPN:				
Overall recruit ranking:
Note: In many cases, Scout, Rivals, 247Sports, On3, and ESPN may conflict in their listings of height and weight.; In these cases, the average was taken. ESPN grades are on a 100-point scale.; Sources: "Texas Football Commitments". Rivals.; "2017 Texas Football Commits". Scout.; "ESPN". ESPN.; "Scout.com Team Recruiting Rankings". Scout.; "2017 Team Ranking". Rivals.com.

== Personnel ==
An entire staff needed to be built as Coach Herman chose not to retain any current staff members that were under Coach Strong. The initial group of 6 that followed Herman from Houston to Texas included four assistant coaches, all of whom have extensive coaching experience in the state of Texas with three being Texas natives. Former Longhorn great Oscar Giles, Corby Meekins, Derek Warehime and Jason Washington all were coaches on Herman's Houston staff and will join him in Austin. Positions and titles for the assistant coaches will be announced after the completion of the staff. In addition, Fernando Lovo will serve as Assistant AD for Football Operations, while Derek Chang will be Director of player personnel. Both also come from Herman's UH staff.

Texas then added another former Herman UH assistant, the one year offensive coordinator from Rutgers Drew Mehringer as the passing game coordinator. 4 more pieces of the puzzle then were announced on Dec 19, more from his Houston staff. Todd Orlando, who was Hermans Defensive Coorindator at Houston comes over in the same role. Assistant Coach Craig Naviar also joins him. Additionally, Yancy McKnight will serve as Head Strength and Conditioning Coach for Football, while Tory Teykl will be Director of football operations. Herman also added the recently retired NFL player and former Longhorn Michael Huff as a quality control/assistant DB coach.

=== Roster and coaching staff ===
2017 Texas Longhorns football team roster
Players
Coaches
Offense

Pos.	#	Name	Class
WR	1	John Burt	Jr
WR	6	Devin Duvernay	So
WR	3	Armanti Foreman	Sr
WR	84	Lil'Jordan Humphrey	So
WR	14	Lorenzo Joe	Sr
QB	7	Shane Buechele	So
WR	8	Dorian Leonard	Sr
WR	9	Collin Johnson	So
QB	11	Sam Ehlinger	Fr
WR	13	Jerrod Heard	Jr
WR	14	Kai Locksley	Fr
WR	17	Reggie Hemphill-Mapps	Fr
QB	18	Josh Covey	So
RB	21	Kyle Porter	So
RB	25	Chris Warren III	Jr
RB	26	Tim Yoder	Jr
RB	27	Roderick Bernard	Sr
RB	28	Kirk Johnson	So
RB	30	Toneil Carter	Fr
WR	36	Eric Gonzalez	So
RB	40	Trenton Hafley	Jr
RB	41	Tristian Houston	So
TE	43	Robert Willis	Sr
TE	47	Andrew Beck	Sr
OL	51	Terrell Cuney	Jr
OL	54	Garrett Graf	Sr
OL	55	Connor Williams	Jr
OL	56	Zach Shackelford	So
OL	58	Brandon Hodges	Sr
OL	63	Alex Anderson	Jr
OL	64	Jake McMillon	Jr
OL	67	Tope Imade	Fr
OL	69	Austin Allsup	Jr
OL	70	Buck Major	So
OL	71	J.P. Urquidez	Fr
OL	72	Elijah Rodriguez	Jr
OL	73	Patrick Hudson	Fr
OL	74	Jean Delance	So
OT	75	Tristan Nickelson	Sr
OL	77	Patrick Vahe	Jr
OL	78	Denzel Okafor	So
OL	79	Garrett Thomas	So
WR	82	Michael Wilson	Jr
WR	16	Davion Curtis	Fr
WR	85	Philipp Moeller	Jr
TE	87	Garrett Gray	Jr
TE	89	Chris Fehr	Jr

Defense

Pos.	#	Name	Class
CB	2	Kris Boyd	Jr
S	4	DeShon Elliott	Jr
DB	5	Holton Hill	Jr
CB	18	Davante Davis	So
DB	11	P. J. Locke	Jr
DB	15	Chris Brown	Fr
DB	19	Brandon Jones	So
LB	23	Jeffrey McCulloch	Fr
DB	23	Jordan Strickland	Jr
CB	24	John Bonney	Jr
CB	7	Antwuan Davis	Sr
DB	26	Eric Cuffee	Fr
DB	27	Donovan Duvernay	Fr
DB	28	Jarmarquis Durst	Jr
S	31	Jason Hall	Sr
LB	31	Kyle Hrncir	So
OLB	32	Malcolm Roach	So
DB	33	Trevor Carr	So
LB	35	Edwin Freeman	Jr
LB	36	Demarco Boyd	Fr
LB	39	Edward Pequeno	So
LS	39	Michael David Poujol	Fr
DE, OLB	40	Naashon Hughes	Sr
LB	42	Jay Harper	Jr
LB	43	Cameron Townsend	So
DE, OLB	44	Breckyn Hager	Jr
LB	45	Anthony Wheeler	Jr
LB	46	Malik Jefferson	Jr
DL	48	Andrew Fitzgerald	Fr
DS	53	Jak Holbrook	Jr
DE	90	Charles Omenihu	Jr
DL	94	Gerald Wilbon	So
DT	95	Poona Ford	Sr
DT	97	Chris Nelson	Jr
DL	98	D'Andre Christmas	So
DL	99	Chris Daniels	Fr

Special teams

Pos.	#	Name	Class
P	37	Michael Dickson	Jr
PK	45	Chris Naggar	Fr
P	38	Mitchell Becker	Sr
PK	49	Joshua Rowland	Jr

Head coach

- Tom Herman

Coordinators/assistant coaches

- Tim Beck (offensive coordinator/quarterbacks)
- Stan Drayton (Associate head coach/run game coordinator/running backs)
- Oscar Giles (defensive line)
- Corby Meekins (Tight ends)
- Drew Mehringer (Pass Game coordinator/wide receivers)
- Craig Naivar (special teams coordinator/safeties)
- Todd Orlando (defensive coordinator/linebackers)
- Derek Warehime (offensive line)
- Jason Washington (Recruiting coordinator/cornerbacks)
- Yancy McKnight (head strength and conditioning coach for football)

Legend

- (C) Team captain
- (S) Suspended
- (I) Ineligible
- Injured
- Redshirt

Roster
Last update: September 5, 2016

== Schedule ==
Date	Time	Opponent	Rank	Site	TV	Result	Attendance
September 2	11:00 a.m.	Maryland*	No. 23	Darrell K Royal–Texas Memorial Stadium; Austin, TX	FS1	L 41–51	88,396
September 9	2:30 p.m.	San Jose State*		Darrell K Royal–Texas Memorial Stadium; Austin, TX	LHN	W 56–0	88,117
September 16	7:30 p.m.	at No. 4 USC*		Los Angeles Memorial Coliseum; Los Angeles, CA	FOX	L 24–27 ^{2OT}	93,607
September 28	7:00 p.m.	at Iowa State		Jack Trice Stadium; Ames, IA	ESPN	W 17–7	51,234
October 7	6:00 p.m.	Kansas State		Darrell K Royal–Texas Memorial Stadium; Austin, TX	FS1	W 40–34 ^{2OT}	90,462
October 14	2:30 p.m.	vs. No. 12 Oklahoma		Cotton Bowl; Dallas, TX (Red River Rivalry)	ESPN	L 24–29	93,552
October 21	11:00 a.m.	No. 10 Oklahoma State^{†}		Darrell K Royal–Texas Memorial Stadium; Austin, TX	ABC	L 10–13 ^{OT}	92,506
October 28	11:00 a.m.	at Baylor		McLane Stadium; Waco, TX (rivalry)	ESPNU	W 38–7	39,110
November 4	6:15 p.m.	at No. 8 TCU		Amon G. Carter Stadium; Ft. Worth, TX (rivalry)	ESPN	L 7–24	48,042
November 11	5:00 p.m.	Kansas		Darrell K Royal–Texas Memorial Stadium; Austin, TX	LHN	W 42–27	96,557
November 18	11:00 a.m.	at West Virginia		Mountaineer Field; Morgantown, WV	ESPN	W 28–14	53,133
November 24	7:00 p.m.	Texas Tech		Darrell K Royal–Texas Memorial Stadium; Austin, TX (Chancellor's Spurs)	FOX	L 23–27	100,629
December 27	8:00 pm	vs. Missouri*		NRG Stadium; Houston, TX (Texas Bowl)	ESPN	W 33–16	67,820
*Non-conference game; ^{†}Homecoming; Rankings from AP Poll released prior to game; All times are in Central time

=== Media affiliates ===
Texas' flagship radio station is KTXX-FM ("The Horn", 104.9 FM) based in Austin, Texas. Fourteen other FM stations and twenty-one AM stations cover UT's football games around Texas, while a pair of FM and AM stations based in Austin cover Texas games in Spanish. Texas Longhorns football games are broadcast via satellite radio on Sirius channel 117, XM channel 202, and SiriusXM channel 969.

== Rankings ==
Ranking movements Legend: ██ Increase in ranking ██ Decrease in ranking — = Not ranked RV = Received votes
	Week															
Poll	Pre	1	2	3	4	5	6	7	8	9	10	11	12	13	14	Final
AP	23	—	—	—	—	—	—	—	—	—	—	—	—	—	—	—
Coaches	23	RV	—	—	—	—	—	—	—	—	—	—	—	—	—	—
CFP	Not released									—	—	—	—	—	—	Not released
