= Gary Patterson =

American football player and coach (born 1960)

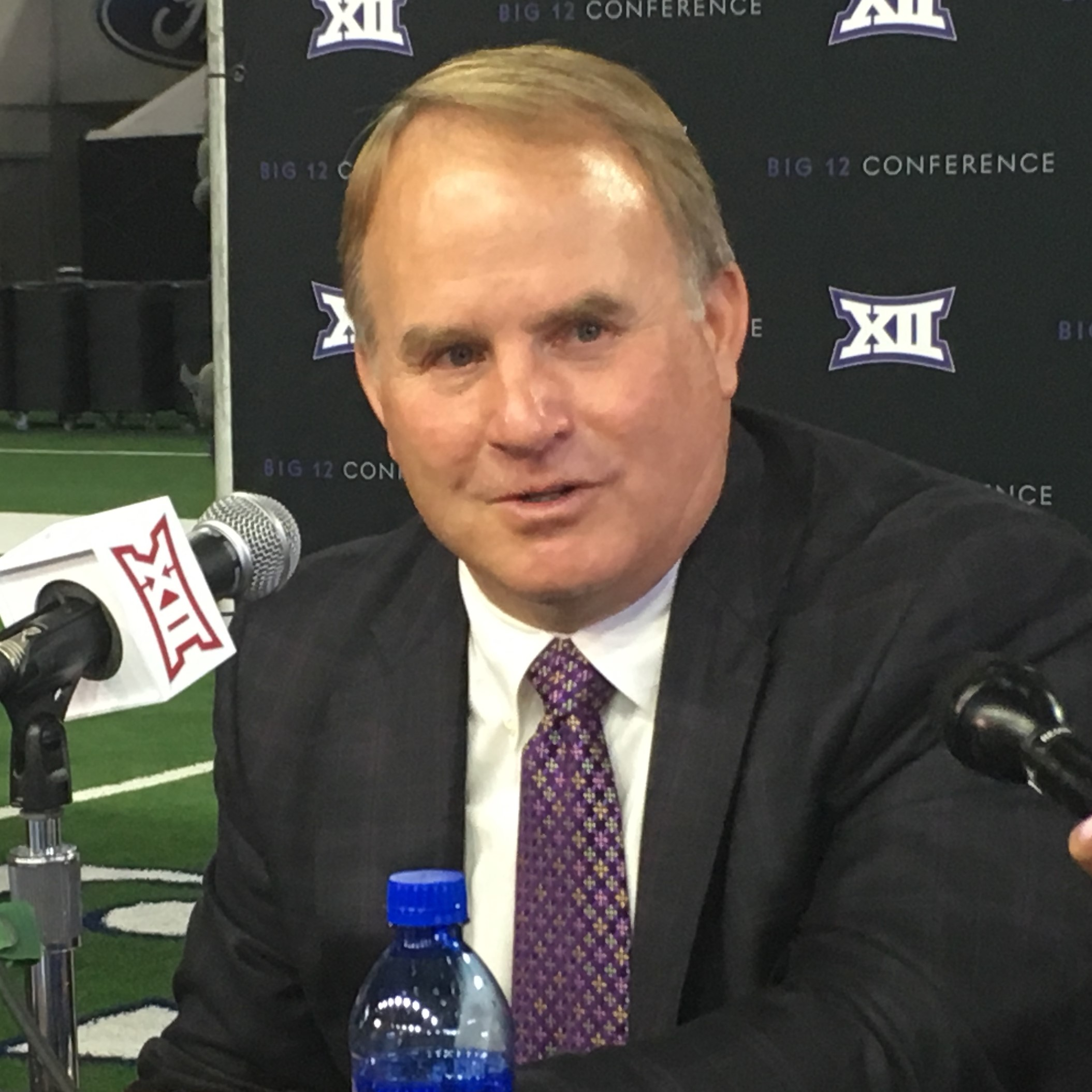

Current position
- Title: Defensive coordinator
- Team: USC
- Conference: Big Ten

Biographical details
- Born: February 13, 1960 (age 66); Rozel, Kansas, U.S.

Playing career
- 1978–1979: Dodge City
- 1980–1981: Kansas State
- Positions: Safety, linebacker

Coaching career (HC unless noted)
- 1982: Kansas State (GA)
- 1983–1984: Tennessee Tech (LB)
- 1986: UC Davis (LB)
- 1987: Cal Lutheran (DC)
- 1988: Pittsburg State (LB)
- 1989–1991: Sonoma State (DC)
- 1992: Oregon Lightning Bolts
- 1992–1994: Utah State (DB)
- 1995: Navy (DB)
- 1996–1997: New Mexico (DC/S)
- 1998–2000: TCU (DC/S)
- 2000–2021: TCU
- 2022: Texas (special assistant to HC)
- 2024: Baylor (consultant)
- 2026–present: USC (DC)

Head coaching record
- Overall: 181–79
- Bowls: 11–6

Accomplishments and honors

Championships
- 1 C-USA (2002); 4 MW (2005, 2009–2011); 1 Big 12 (2014)

Awards
- 2× AFCA Coach of the Year (2009, 2014); 2× AP Coach of the Year (2009, 2014); Bobby Dodd Coach of the Year (2009); 2× Eddie Robinson Coach of the Year (2009, 2014); George Munger Award (2009); Liberty Mutual Coach of the Year Award (2009); 2× SN Coach of the Year (2009, 2014); 2× Walter Camp Coach of the Year (2009, 2014); 2× The Woody Hayes Trophy (2009, 2014); Home Depot Coach of the Year Award (2014); Paul "Bear" Bryant Award (2014); C-USA Coach of the Year (2002); 2× MW Coach of the Year (2005, 2009); Big 12 Coach of the Year (2014)
- College Football Hall of Fame; Inducted in 2026 (profile)

Gary Allen Patterson (born February 13, 1960) is an American college football coach and former player. He is currently the defensive coordinator at USC. He served as head football coach at Texas Christian University (TCU) from 2000 to 2021, compiling a record of 181–79. Patterson led the TCU Horned Frogs to six conference championships and 11 bowl game victories, including victories in the 2011 Rose Bowl and 2014 Peach Bowl. His 2010 squad finished the season undefeated at 13–0 after a 21–19 Rose Bowl victory over the Wisconsin Badgers on New Year's Day 2011, and ranked second in the final tallying of both major polls.

== Early life, playing career, education, and family ==
Patterson grew up in Rozel, Kansas, and played football at Dodge City Community College and at Kansas State University. Patterson is married to Kelsey Patterson (née Hayes). He has three sons: Josh, Cade, and Blake. He received his bachelor's degree in physical education in 1983 from Kansas State University, where he became a member of the Acacia fraternity. While coaching at Tennessee Technological University, he earned a master's degree in educational administration in 1984. Outside of coaching, Patterson plays guitar and performs at charity events around the Dallas-Fort Worth area during the off-season.

== Coaching career ==
=== Early years ===
Patterson began his coaching career in 1982 at Kansas State University as an assistant to head coach Jim Dickey. After subsequently serving a number of years as an assistant coach at a number of different schools, Patterson was hired by Dennis Franchione as the defensive coordinator at the University of New Mexico in 1996. He had previously served as a linebackers coach at Tennessee Tech (1983–1984) where Franchione was the offensive coordinator and in the same capacity on Franchione's Pittsburg State University staff in 1988, as well as playing on the 1980 Kansas State Wildcats football team when Franchione was an assistant on the coaching staff. He followed Franchione to Texas Christian University (TCU) in 1998, serving as the defensive coordinator there, as well. Patterson was a 2000 finalist for the Broyles Award, given annually to the nation's top college football assistant coach. He was named head coach at TCU prior to the Mobile Alabama Bowl in December 2000 after Franchione left to become the head coach at the University of Alabama.

Patterson remains friends with former New Mexico State head coach Jerry Kill from their time as coaches on Franchione's Pittsburg State staff. Kill served as the best man during Patterson's wedding to wife Kelsey in 2004.

=== Head coach at TCU ===
Patterson won his 110th game at TCU with a 56–0 victory over Grambling, passing Dutch Meyer as the winningest coach in program history. His teams won 10 games or more in a season eleven times. Only three times have they failed to reach a bowl, in 2004, 2013, and 2019. Under Patterson, the Horned Frogs earned a spot in the year-end top 25 ten times, counting his partial season as head coach in 2000. In 2005, Patterson led the Frogs to the Mountain West Conference championship in their first season as a member. Over the course of the 2005 and 2006 seasons, the Frogs won four consecutive games against Big 12 Conference opponents, with three of the victories coming on the road. He tandem jumped with the Army Golden Knights prior to the 2005 TCU vs. Army football game, crossing skydiving off his bucket list. Patterson was named the 2005 Mountain West Conference Coach of the Year. In January 2007, Patterson turned down a head coaching offer from the University of Minnesota worth over $2 million per year.

Patterson led the 2009 Horned Frogs to a perfect 12–0 regular season record, a Mountain West Conference championship, a No. 4 final BCS ranking, and an invitation to the 2010 Fiesta Bowl—their first major bowl appearance in 51 years. They ultimately lost 17–10 to undefeated No. 6 Boise State. The 2009 Horned Frogs became the second "BCS Buster" from the Mountain West Conference (and the fourth, overall). For much of the season, they were a contender for the 2010 BCS National Championship Game. However, any chance of the Horned Frogs playing for the national championship ended on the final day of the season, when Cincinnati defeated Pitt. This assured that two teams from Automatic Qualifying conferences would finish the regular season undefeated (whoever won the 2009 SEC Championship Game would have also finished undefeated). Patterson was named the 2009 AP Coach of the Year, becoming the first head coach of a BCS non-AQ conference team to win the award. He won a total of seven national "Coach of the Year" awards in 2009 in addition to being named the Mountain West Conference Coach of the Year for the second time (his third conference "Coach of the Year" award, overall).

The following year, Patterson led the 2010 Horned Frogs to a second consecutive undefeated regular season and a No. 3 final BCS ranking. TCU received the first Rose Bowl invitation offered to a team from a non-automatic qualifying conference during the BCS era. The Horned Frogs won the 2011 Rose Bowl, 21–19, over Wisconsin to cap off only the second undefeated and untied season in school history. When TCU entered the Big 12 Conference in 2012, Patterson was faced with 7–6 2012 and 4–8 2013 seasons, but turned it around and led the Horned Frogs to their first Big 12 title in 2014, going 11–1, finishing in the top 5 of polls, with impressive wins over No. 4 Oklahoma, Minnesota, No. 7 Kansas State and scoring 82 points behind a 31-point third quarter against Texas Tech.

The 2014 TCU Horned Frogs football team shared a conference title with Baylor and were ranked No. 6 by the inaugural College Football Playoff selection committee. Patterson once again won several national "Coach of the Year" honors for turning the team around after the 2013 season. He was also named the Big 12 Chuck Neinas Coach of the Year, his 4th such award in 3 different conferences, all earned while at TCU.

In August 2016, TCU announced Patterson's contract had been extended through 2022, with an annual base salary of $4.75 million. The Frogs went 6–7 (4–5) in 2016 losing 31–23 to Georgia in the Liberty Bowl. In 2017, TCU opened with a 63–0 victory Jackson State. They defeated Arkansas 28–7 in Week 2. In Week 3, the No. 20 Frogs beat SMU in the Iron Skillet Rivalry 56–36. In week 4, the No. 16 Frogs upset No. 6 Oklahoma State 44–31 behind a 31 carry 160 yard 3 touchdown performance from halfback Darius Anderson. Next, the No. 9 Frogs won 31–24 over No. 23 West Virginia in a game in which quarterback Kenny Hill had a passing, rushing, and receiving touchdown. No. 6 TCU then won 26–6 over Kansas State and moved up to No. 4 with a 6–0 start. They shutout Kansas 43–0 to move to 7–0 and lead the Big 12. However, in Week 8 they lost 14–7 to No. 25 Iowa State dropping to No. 8. They beat Texas the next week 24–7 moving up to No. 6, but they lost 38–20 to No. 5 Oklahoma. TCU bounced back by beating Texas Tech 27–3 in which Kenny Hill didn't play. In Week 13, the No. 12 Frogs beat Baylor 45–22 to finish 10–2. They made the Big 12 Title Game as No. 11 but lost 41–17 to No. 3 Oklahoma. They dropped to No. 13 and were selected to the Alamo Bowl against No. 15 Stanford. TCU beat Stanford 39–37 to win the Alamo Bowl.

Patterson began the 2021 season 3–5 and resigned on October 31, 2021, after being told he would not return for 2022. At the time of his departure, he was the second longest tenured coach in the FBS, only behind Iowa's Kirk Ferentz.

=== After TCU ===
Patterson served as an off-field analyst at the University of Texas for the 2022 season, working with head coach Steve Sarkisian. After taking the 2023 season off, he spent six months as a consultant at Baylor, departing before the start of the 2024 season.

Patterson was enshrined into the TCU Athletics Hall of Fame on September 18, 2025 and honored at halftime against rival SMU on September 20, 2025.

=== USC ===
On January 21, 2026, Patterson was named defensive coordinator at USC.

== Charitable work ==
=== Gary Patterson Foundation ===
Gary and Kelsey Patterson are dedicated to supporting children in and around Fort Worth through The Gary Patterson Foundation. Gary serves as the chairman, and Kelsey serves as the secretary/treasurer and manages the daily operations. Through grants, scholarships and collaboration with other area non-profit organizations, the foundation's primary goal is to provide equitable educational opportunities for all children.

In December 2018, The Gary Patterson Foundation donated $325,000 to 38 Fort Worth ISD elementary schools to upgrade the schools' libraries. Gary and Kelsey Patterson were subsequently awarded the 2019 Texas Library Association Benefactor Award.

== Head coaching record ==
Year	Team	Overall	Conference	Standing	Bowl/playoffs	Coaches^{#}	AP^{°}
TCU Horned Frogs (Western Athletic Conference) (2000)
2000	TCU	0–1 (Note: Dennis Franchione coached the first 11 games of the 2000 season.)			L Mobile Alabama Bowl	18	21
TCU Horned Frogs (Conference USA) (2001–2004)
2001	TCU	6–6	4–3	T–5th	L Galleryfurniture.com		
2002	TCU	10–2	6–2	T–1st	W Liberty	22	23
2003	TCU	11–2	7–1	2nd	L Fort Worth	24	25
2004	TCU	5–6	3–5	T–6th			
TCU Horned Frogs (Mountain West Conference) (2005–2011)
2005	TCU	11–1	8–0	1st	W Houston	9	11
2006	TCU	11–2	6–2	2nd	W Poinsettia	21	22
2007	TCU	8–5	4–4	5th	W Texas		
2008	TCU	11–2	7–1	2nd	W Poinsettia	7	7
2009	TCU	12–1	8–0	1st	L Fiesta^{†}	6	6
2010	TCU	13–0	8–0	1st	W Rose^{†}	2	2
2011	TCU	11–2	7–0	1st	W Poinsettia	13	14
TCU Horned Frogs (Big 12 Conference) (2012–2021)
2012	TCU	7–6	4–5	T–5th	L Buffalo Wild Wings		
2013	TCU	4–8	2–7	T–7th			
2014	TCU	12–1	8–1	T-1st	W Peach^{†}	3	3
2015	TCU	11–2	7–2	T–2nd	W Alamo	7	7
2016	TCU	6–7	4–5	5th	L Liberty		
2017	TCU	11–3	7–2	2nd	W Alamo	9	9
2018	TCU	7–6	4–5	T–5th	W Cheez-It		
2019	TCU	5–7	3–6	T–7th			
2020	TCU	6–4	5–4	5th	Texas (Note: The 2020 Texas Bowl was cancelled due to COVID-19 issues and was ruled a no contest.)		
2021	TCU	3–5 (Note: Patterson and TCU parted ways after eight games)	1–4	8th			
TCU:		181–79	113–59				
Total:		181–79					
National championship Conference title Conference division title or championship game berth
^{†}Indicates BCS or CFP / New Years' Six bowl.; ^{#}Rankings from final Coaches Poll.; ^{°}Rankings from final AP Poll.
