= 2017 West Virginia Mountaineers football team =

American college football season

2017 West Virginia Mountaineers football

Heart of Dallas Bowl, L 14–30 vs. Utah
- Conference: Big 12 Conference
- Record: 7–6 (5–4 Big 12)
- Head coach: Dana Holgorsen (7th season)
- Offensive coordinator: Jake Spavital (1st season)
- Offensive scheme: Air raid
- Defensive coordinator: Tony Gibson (4th season)
- Base defense: 3–3–5
- Home stadium: Mountaineer Field at Milan Puskar Stadium

2017 Big 12 Conference football standings
| | Conf. | | | Overall |
| Team | W | | L | W | | L |
|---|---|---|---|---|---|---|
| No. 3 Oklahoma y$^ | 8 | – | 1 | 12 | – | 2 |
| No. 9 TCU y | 7 | – | 2 | 11 | – | 3 |
| No. 14 Oklahoma State | 6 | – | 3 | 10 | – | 3 |
| Texas | 5 | – | 4 | 7 | – | 6 |
| West Virginia | 5 | – | 4 | 7 | – | 6 |
| Kansas State | 5 | – | 4 | 8 | – | 5 |
| Iowa State | 5 | – | 4 | 8 | – | 5 |
| Texas Tech | 3 | – | 6 | 6 | – | 7 |
| Baylor | 1 | – | 8 | 1 | – | 11 |
| Kansas | 0 | – | 9 | 1 | – | 11 |
Championship: Oklahoma 41, TCU 17
^ – College Football Playoff participant; $ – Conference champion; y – Championship game participant; Rankings from AP Poll

The 2017 West Virginia Mountaineers football team represented West Virginia University in the 2017 NCAA Division I FBS football season. The Mountaineers played their home games at the Mountaineer Field at Milan Puskar Stadium, in Morgantown, West Virginia, and competed in the Big 12 Conference. They were led by seventh-year head coach Dana Holgorsen. They finished the season 7–6, 5–4 in Big 12 play to finish in a four-way tie for fourth place. They were invited to the Heart of Dallas Bowl where they lost to Utah.

== Preseason ==
=== Big 12 Media poll ===
The 2017 Big 12 media days were held July 17–18, 2017 in Frisco, Texas. In the Big 12 preseason media poll, West Virginia was predicted to finish sixth in the standings.

Big 12 media poll
| Predicted finish | Team | Votes (1st place) |
| 1 | Oklahoma | 303 (19) |
| 2 | Oklahoma State | 294 (12) |
| 3 | Kansas State | 231 (1) |
| 4 | Texas | 213 |
| 5 | TCU | 202 |
| 6 | West Virginia | 183 |
| 7 | Baylor | 129 |
| 8 | Texas Tech | 85 |
| 9 | Iowa State | 83 |
| 10 | Kansas | 37 |

== Coaching staff ==
| Name | Title |
|---|---|
| Dana Holgorsen | Head coach |
| Tony Gibson | Associate head coach, Defensive coordinator/linebackers |
| Jake Spavital | Offensive coordinator/quarterbacks |
| Doug Belk | Cornerbacks |
| Matt Caponi | Safeties |
| Tyron Carrier | Receivers |
| Tony Dews | Running backs |
| Mark Scott | Defense/special teams |
| Bruce Tall | Defensive line |
| Joe Wickline | Offensive line |

== Schedule ==
West Virginia announced its 2017 football schedule on December 13, 2016. The 2017 schedule consists of six home, five away, and one neutral site game in the regular season. The Mountaineers will host Big 12 foes Iowa State, Oklahoma State, Texas, and Texas Tech, and will travel to Baylor, Kansas, Kansas State, Oklahoma, and TCU.

The Mountaineers will host two of the three non-conference opponents, Delaware State from the Mid-Eastern Athletic Conference and East Carolina from the American Athletic Conference and travel to Landover, Maryland to face Virginia Tech.

| Date | Time | Opponent | Rank | Site | TV | Result | Attendance |
|---|---|---|---|---|---|---|---|
| September 3 | 7:30 p.m. | vs. No. 21 Virginia Tech* | No. 22 | FedExField; Landover, MD (rivalry) | ABC | L 24–31 | 67,489 |
| September 9 | Noon | East Carolina* | | Mountaineer Field; Morgantown, WV (Gold Rush) | FS2 | W 56–20 | 56,797 |
| September 16 | Noon | Delaware State* | | Mountaineer Field; Morgantown, WV | AT&TSN Pitt | W 59–16 | 51,482 |
| September 23 | Noon | at Kansas | | Memorial Stadium; Lawrence, KS | ESPNU | W 56–34 | 23,901 |
| October 7 | 3:30 p.m. | at No. 8 TCU | No. 23 | Amon G. Carter Stadium; Fort Worth, TX (College GameDay) | FS1 | L 24–31 | 43,257 |
| October 14 | Noon | No. 24 Texas Tech^{†} | | Mountaineer Field; Morgantown, WV (Stripe the Stadium) | ESPNU | W 46–35 | 60,928 |
| October 21 | 8:00 p.m. | at Baylor | No. 23 | McLane Stadium; Waco, TX | FS2 | W 38–36 | 45,389 |
| October 28 | Noon | No. 11 Oklahoma State | No. 22 | Mountaineer Field; Morgantown, WV (True Blue) | ABC | L 39–50 | 57,507 |
| November 4 | 3:30 p.m. | No. 15 Iowa State | | Mountaineer Field; Morgantown, WV | ESPN2 | W 20–16 | 55,831 |
| November 11 | 3:30 p.m. | at Kansas State | | Bill Snyder Family Football Stadium; Manhattan, KS | ESPN2 | W 28–23 | 51,223 |
| November 18 | Noon | Texas | | Mountaineer Field; Morgantown, WV | ESPN | L 14–28 | 53,133 |
| November 25 | 3:45 p.m. | at No. 4 Oklahoma | | Gaylord Family Oklahoma Memorial Stadium; Norman, OK | ESPN | L 31–59 | 86,117 |
| December 26 | 1:30 p.m. | vs. Utah* | | Cotton Bowl; Dallas, TX (Heart of Dallas Bowl) | ESPN | L 14–30 | 20,507 |
*Non-conference game; ^{†}Homecoming; Rankings from AP Poll and CFP Rankings after October 31 released prior to game; All times are in Eastern time

Schedule source:

== Rankings ==
Ranking movements Legend: ██ Increase in ranking ██ Decrease in ranking — = Not ranked RV = Received votes
| | Week | | | | | | | | | | | | | | | |
| Poll | Pre | 1 | 2 | 3 | 4 | 5 | 6 | 7 | 8 | 9 | 10 | 11 | 12 | 13 | 14 | Final |
|---|---|---|---|---|---|---|---|---|---|---|---|---|---|---|---|---|
| AP | 22 | RV | RV | RV | 23 | 23 | RV | 23 | 22 | RV | 23 | 24 | RV | — | — | — |
| Coaches | 20 | RV | RV | RV | 23 | 23 | RV | 23 | 22 | RV | RV | 25 | RV | — | — | — |
| CFP | Not released | | | | | | | | | — | — | — | — | — | — | Not released |
