= Darius Anderson =

American football player (born 1997)

No. 30
- Position: Running back

Personal information
- Born: September 10, 1997 (age 29); Richmond, Texas, U.S.
- Listed height: 5 ft 11 in (1.80 m)
- Listed weight: 212 lb (96 kg)

Career information
- High school: George Ranch (Richmond)
- College: TCU (2016–2019)
- NFL draft: 2020: undrafted

Career history
- Dallas Cowboys (2020)*; Indianapolis Colts (2020); Houston Texans (2021–2022)
- * Offseason or practice squad member only
- Stats at Pro Football Reference

Darius "Jet" Anderson (born September 10, 1997) is an American former professional football running back. He played college football for the TCU Horned Frogs.

== Early life ==
Anderson attended George Ranch High School. As a junior, he received District 24-5A Offensive MVP honors.

As a senior, he led his team to a 16-0 season and a 5A Division I State Championship. He registered 2,274 rushing yards (8.7-yard avg.), 30 rushing touchdowns, 13 receptions and 2 receiving touchdowns. He received Houston Chronicle Offensive Player of the Year, and State Championship game MVP honors, after rushing for 246 yards.

He was a three-star recruit coming out of high school and committed to play football at Texas Christian University, turning down offers from Alabama, Texas and Texas A&M.

== College career ==
Anderson accepted a football scholarship from Texas Christian University. As a true freshman, he appeared in 11 games, tallying 27 carries for 229 yards (third on the team) and an 8.5-yard average. Against the University of Texas, he had 103 rushing yards and scored his first career touchdown on a 70-yard run.

As a sophomore, he appeared in 11 games (3 starts), leading the team with 128 carries for 768 yards and 8 rushing touchdowns. He ranked third in the conference with 6.0 yards per carry. He was on pace for a 1,000 rushing yard season, until being injured in the tenth game against the University of Oklahoma. He had 26 carries for 160 yards, 3 touchdowns and 4 receptions for 41 yards against Oklahoma State University.

As a junior, he appeared in 11 games, missing the last 2 contests with an injury. He was second on the team behind Sewo Olonilua, with 124 carries for 598 yards (4.8-yard avg.). He had 12 carries for 154 yards against Ohio State University.

As a senior, he led the team with 823 yards (5.5-yard avg.) and 6 rushing touchdowns. He had a career-high 179 yards and 2 touchdowns against Purdue University. He posted 161 and 115 rushing yards in games against SMU and the University of Kansas.

He played in the 2020 Senior Bowl, recording 43 rushing yards, 87 receiving yards, and one receiving touchdown.

== Professional career ==
Pre-draft measurables
Height	Weight	Arm length	Hand span	Wingspan	40-yard dash	10-yard split	20-yard split	20-yard shuttle	Vertical jump	Broad jump	Bench press
5 ft 10 1/2 in (1.79 m)	208 lb (94 kg)	30 1/2 in (0.77 m)	9 5/8 in (0.24 m)	6 ft 2 3/8 in (1.89 m)	4.61 s	1.54 s	2.72 s	4.19 s	36.0 in (0.91 m)	10 ft 8 in (3.25 m)	19 reps
All values from NFL Combine

=== Dallas Cowboys ===
Anderson was signed as an undrafted free agent by the Dallas Cowboys after the 2020 NFL draft on April 27. He was waived on September 4, 2020.

=== Indianapolis Colts ===
On September 8, 2020, Anderson was signed to the Indianapolis Colts' practice squad. He was elevated to the active roster on January 3 and January 8, 2021, for the team's week 17 and wild card playoff games against the Jacksonville Jaguars and Buffalo Bills, and reverted to the practice squad after each game. On January 10, 2021, Anderson signed a reserve/futures contract with the Colts. He was waived on August 17.

=== Houston Texans ===
On December 15, 2021, Anderson was signed to the Houston Texans practice squad. He signed a reserve/future contract with the Texans on January 11, 2022. He was placed on injured reserve on August 10, 2022.

== Personal life ==
On July 15, 2022, Anderson was arrest for burglary with intent to commit assault in Harris County, Texas and was released on bond. On August 6, the charges against Anderson were dropped.
