= 2017 Alamo Bowl =

2017 Valero Alamo Bowl
- 25th Alamo Bowl
Stanford Cardinal	TCU Horned Frogs
(9–4)	(10–3)
Pac-12	Big 12
37	39
Head coach: David Shaw	Head coach: Gary Patterson
AP / Coaches / CFP; 15 / 16 / 13	AP / Coaches / CFP; 13 / 13 / 15
	1	2	3	4	Total
Stanford	14	7	10	6	37
TCU	3	7	13	16	39
- Date: December 28, 2017
- Season: 2017
- Stadium: Alamodome
- Location: San Antonio, Texas
- MVP: Offensive: Kenny Hill (QB, TCU); Defensive: Travin Howard (LB, TCU)
- Favorite: TCU by 3
- Referee: Ken Williamson (SEC)
- Attendance: 57,653
- Payout: US$7,575,000

United States TV coverage
- Network: ESPN
- Announcers: TV: Rece Davis, Joey Galloway, David Pollack, Quint Kessenich; Radio: Bill Rosinski, David Norrie, Ian Fitzsimmons

The 2017 Alamo Bowl (December) was a college football bowl game played on December 28, 2017, at the Alamodome in San Antonio, Texas. The 25th annual Alamo Bowl featured the Stanford Cardinal of the Pac-12 against the TCU Horned Frogs of the Big 12. It was one of the 2017–18 bowl games concluding the 2017 FBS football season. Sponsored by Valero Energy, the game was officially known as the Valero Alamo Bowl. The contest was televised on ESPN, with kickoff at 8:00 p.m. (CST).

== Team selection ==
The game featured the Stanford Cardinal against the TCU Horned Frogs. This was the third meeting between the schools – they played games in 2007 and 2008 at each team's home stadium; TCU won both games to lead the series 2–0.

== Game summary ==
=== Scoring summary ===
Scoring summary

Quarter	Time	Drive			Team	Scoring information	Score	
Quarter	Time	Plays	Yards	TOP	Team	Scoring information	STAN	TCU
1	8:42	3	23	1:26	STAN	Bryce Love 15-yard touchdown run, Jet Toner kick good	7	0
1	6:01	8	58	2:41	TCU	38-yard field goal by Cole Bunce	7	3
1	1:51	7	70	4:10	STAN	J. J. Arcega-Whiteside 18-yard touchdown reception from K. J. Costello, Jet Toner kick good	14	3
2	7:24	11	53	6:06	STAN	J. J. Arcega-Whiteside 14-yard touchdown reception from K. J. Costello, Jet Toner kick good	21	3
2	3:06	9	76	4:18	TCU	Kenny Hill 6-yard touchdown run, Cole Bunce kick good	21	10
3	11:11	9	75	3:49	TCU	Kenny Hill 27-yard touchdown reception from Desmon White, Cole Bunce kick no good	21	16
3	9:01	4	79	2:10	STAN	Bryce Love 69-yard touchdown run, Jet Toner kick good	28	16
3	5:51	9	75	3:10	TCU	Desmon White 11-yard touchdown reception from Kenny Hill, Cole Bunce kick good	28	23
3	2:09	7	64	3:42	STAN	27-yard field goal by Jet Toner	31	23
4	14:34	1	93	0:11	TCU	Jalen Reagor 93-yard touchdown reception from Kenny Hill, 2-point pass failed	31	29
4	11:49	-	-	-	TCU	Desmon White 76 yard punt return	31	36
4	6:42	10	76	5:07	STAN	J. J. Arcega-Whiteside 4-yard touchdown reception from K. J. Costello, 2-point pass failed	37	36
4	3:07	9	59	3:35	TCU	33-yard field goal by Cole Bunce	37	39
"TOP" = time of possession. For other American football terms, see Glossary of American football.							37	39

=== Statistics ===
	1	2	3	4	Total
No. 13 Cardinal	14	7	10	6	37
No. 15 Horned Frogs	3	7	13	16	39

Statistics	STAN	TCU
First downs	17	21
Plays–yards	61–369	67–488
Rushes–yards	34–157	26–147
Passing yards	212	341
Passing: Comp–Att–Int	15–27–2	28–41–2
Time of possession	33:03	26:57

Team	Category	Player	Statistics
STAN	Passing	K. J. Costello	15/27, 212 yds, 3 TD, 2 INT
STAN	Rushing	Bryce Love	26 car, 145 yds, 2 TD
STAN	Receiving	Cameron Scarlett	2 rec, 85 yds
TCU	Passing	Kenny Hill	24/40, 314 yds, 2 TD, 2 INT
TCU	Rushing	Kenny Hill	9 car, 40 yds, 1 TD
TCU	Receiving	Jalen Reagor	5 rec, 169 yds, 1 TD
