= Kenny Hill (quarterback) =

American football player and coach (born 1994)

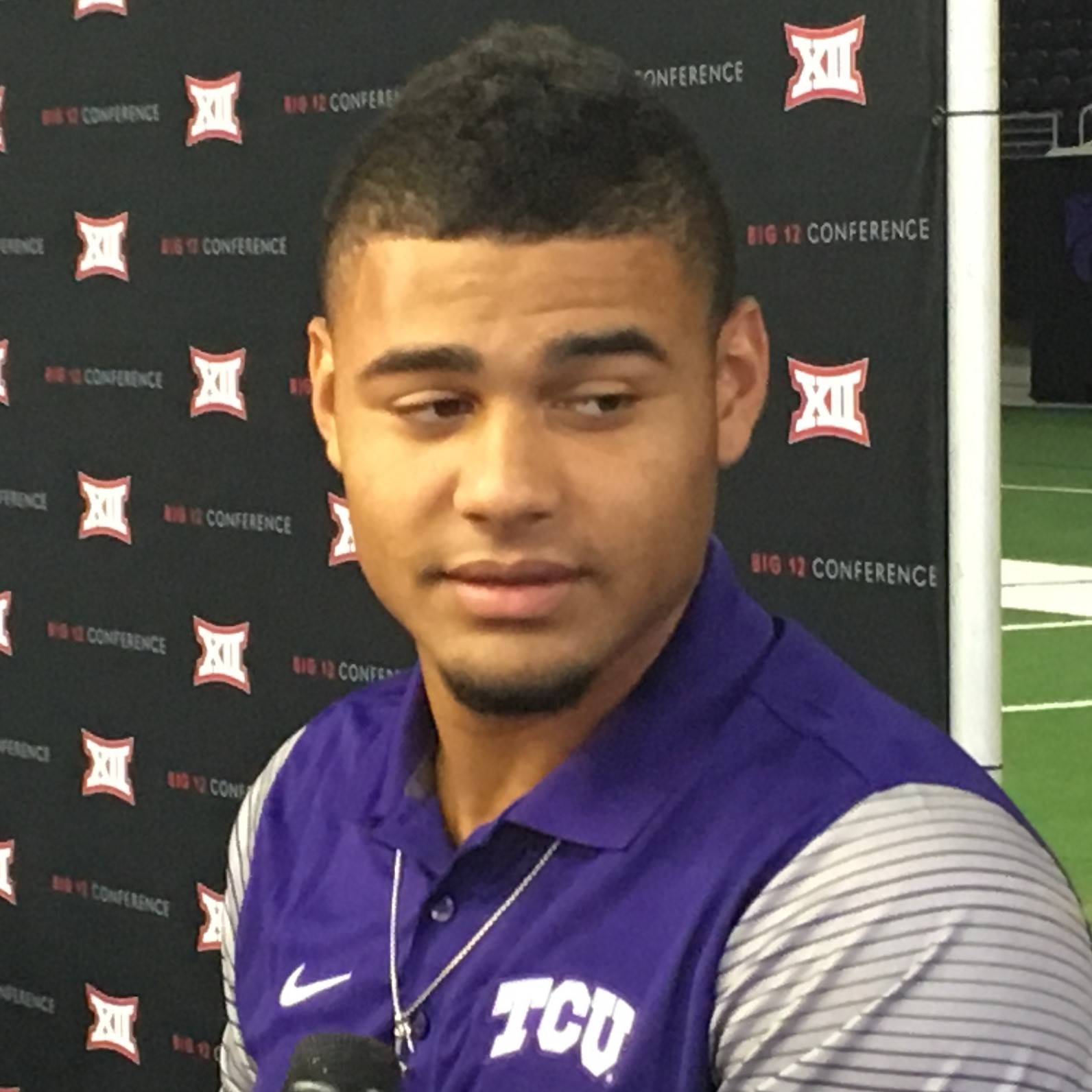
- Hill at 2017 Big 12 Media Days

Arkansas State Red Wolves
- Title: Running backs coach

Personal information
- Born: December 20, 1994 (age 31); West Palm Beach, Florida, U.S.
- Listed height: 6 ft 0 in (1.83 m)
- Listed weight: 205 lb (93 kg)

Career information
- Position: Quarterback
- High school: Southlake Carroll (Southlake, Texas)
- College: Texas A&M (2013–2014); TCU (2015–2017)
- NFL draft: 2018: undrafted

Career history

Playing
- Oakland Raiders (2018)*; Montreal Alouettes (2018)*
- * Offseason or practice squad member only

Coaching
- TCU (2018) Student assistant; TCU (2019) Graduate assistant; TCU (2020) Offensive analyst; TCU (2021) Quarterbacks coach; California (2022) Offensive quality control coach; Incarnate Word (2023–2024) Associate head coach & running backs coach; Incarnate Word (2025) Co-offensive coordinator & running backs coach; Arkansas State (2026–present) Running backs coach

Awards and highlights
- 2012 Star-Telegram Super Team Offensive Player of the Year; 2012 Gatorade Texas Player of Year; 2012 Texas Associated Press Class 5A Offensive Player of the Year; 2012 Texas Associated Press Class 5A First Team All-State; 2016 Big 12 Preseason Newcomer of the Year

Kenneth Wade Hill Jr. (born December 20, 1994) is an American football coach and former quarterback who is currently the running backs coach at Arkansas State. He played college football for the Texas A&M Aggies and TCU Horned Frogs. In his first start with the Aggies, he broke Johnny Manziel's school single-game passing yards record with 511 yards.

== Early life ==
Hill attended Carroll High School, in Southlake, Texas, where he played for the football team. As a senior, he was the Texas Gatorade Football Player of the Year after passing for 2,291 yards with 20 touchdowns with 102 carries for 905 yards and rushing for 22 touchdowns. Hill also led Southlake Carroll to a 5A State Championship in 2011 where he completed 243 of 286 passes for 3,014 yards and 25 touchdowns with 9 interceptions; rushed for 280 carries, gaining 1,400 yards and 24 touchdowns.

Hill was highly recruited out of high school; in addition to Texas A&M, he received offers from Baylor, Houston, Kansas State, Missouri, North Carolina, Ole Miss, Southern Miss, TCU, Texas Tech, and Utah.

College recruiting
| Name | Hometown | School | Height | Weight | Commit date |
|---|---|---|---|---|---|
| Kenny Hill; QB | Southlake, Texas | Southlake Carroll (Southlake, TX) | 6 ft 1 in (1.85 m) | 205 lb (93 kg) | Apr 29, 2012 |
| Kenny Hill; QB | Recruit ratings: Scout: Rivals: (78) | | | | |
Overall recruit ranking: Scout: 16 (QB) Rivals: 4 (QB) ESPN: 21 (DT-QB)
Note: In many cases, Scout, Rivals, 247Sports, On3, and ESPN may conflict in their listings of height and weight.; In these cases, the average was taken. ESPN grades are on a 100-point scale.; Sources: "Texas A&M Football Commitments". Rivals.; "2013 Texas A & M College Football Recruiting Commits". Scout.; "ESPN". ESPN.; "Scout.com Team Recruiting Rankings". Scout.; "2013 Team Ranking". Rivals.com.

== College career ==
=== Texas A&M ===
As a true freshman in 2013, Hill was a backup to starter Johnny Manziel. He appeared in four games, passing for 183 yards and a touchdown.

After Manziel was drafted, Hill was named the Aggies starting quarterback for the 2014 season on August 16, 2014. In his first start against #9 South Carolina, Hill broke Manziel's passing yards record with 511 yards and four touchdowns. With a 52–28 win, the #21 Texas A&M broke South Carolina's 18-game streak of home victories. During that same game, he broke Ryan Tannehill's record of most passing yards in first career start and Jerrod Johnson's record of most completions in a game, with the record now at 44 completions. It was also the second-most completions and fifth-most passing yards in a game in SEC history. On September 6, 2014, in his second game as a starter, Hill had another stellar performance against the FCS school, Lamar University, completing 17 of 26 passes for 283 yards and four touchdowns in a blowout 73–3 win. He continued playing well in his next two games against Rice and SMU, with respective completion percentages of 64.5 and 72.7.

However, when the Aggies reached mid-season and began playing tougher opponents, Hill's performance dropped notably. On September 27 he threw 41 passes against Arkansas, only 21 of which were completed, giving him a completion percentage of 51.2-- his worst as a college football starter as of August 2017. In the following three games against ranked Mississippi State, Ole Miss, and Alabama, Hill averaged 301.3 yards per game for six touchdowns and six interceptions. He was sacked 11 times. He completed only one pass of 30 or more yards in these three games. Due to these struggles on the field, notably against better competition where the Aggies lost three straight games, Hill was replaced mid-season by true freshman Kyle Allen. On November 1, 2014, the team suspended Hill for two games due to a violation of team rules and athletic department policies.

=== TCU ===
On January 9, 2015, Texas A&M granted Hill a release from his football scholarship with two years of eligibility remaining. On May 22, 2015, Hill announced that he was transferring to Texas Christian University and planned to play for the TCU Horned Frogs football team. As a transfer, Hill was required to sit out the 2015 season.

Ahead of the 2016 Big 12 media days, and prior to TCU head coach Gary Patterson naming a starting quarterback for the 2016 season, Hill was selected by Big 12 media voters as the Big 12 Preseason Newcomer of the Year. On August 25, 2016, Hill was named the starting quarterback over redshirt sophomore Foster Sawyer.

Hill and the Horned Frogs finished the 2017 season 11–3 and ranked 9th in both the final AP and Coaches poll. He ended the season and his college career having beat the then 15th ranked Stanford Cardinal football team, 39–37, in the 2017 Valero Alamo Bowl.

=== College statistics ===
| Year | Team | Games | | | Passing | | | | | | | | Rushing | | | |
| Year | Team | GP | GS | Record | Comp | Att | Pct | Yards | Avg | TD | Int | Rate | Att | Yards | Avg | TD |
|---|---|---|---|---|---|---|---|---|---|---|---|---|---|---|---|---|
| 2013 | Texas A&M | 4 | 0 | — | 16 | 22 | 72.7 | 183 | 8.3 | 1 | 0 | 157.6 | 7 | 37 | 5.3 | 0 |
| 2014 | Texas A&M | 8 | 8 | 5−3 | 214 | 321 | 66.7 | 2,649 | 8.3 | 23 | 8 | 154.6 | 52 | 156 | 3.0 | 0 |
| 2015 | TCU | 0 | 0 | — | Did not play due to NCAA transfer rules | | | | | | | | | | | |
| 2016 | TCU | 13 | 12 | 6−6 | 269 | 440 | 61.1 | 3,208 | 7.3 | 17 | 13 | 129.2 | 125 | 609 | 4.9 | 10 |
| 2017 | TCU | 13 | 13 | 10−3 | 269 | 400 | 67.3 | 3,152 | 7.9 | 23 | 8 | 148.4 | 100 | 325 | 3.3 | 5 |
| Totals | | 38 | 34 | 21−12 | 768 | 1,183 | 64.9 | 9,192 | 7.8 | 64 | 29 | 143.1 | 284 | 1,127 | 4.0 | 15 |

== Professional career ==
After being undrafted, Kenny signed a contract with the Oakland Raiders but was cut on June 24. He was then signed to the practice roster of the Montreal Alouettes on June 25, 2018. He was released by the Alouettes on July 4, 2018.

== Coaching career ==
=== TCU ===
Hill was hired to be a student assistant at his alma mater TCU in 2018, before being promoted to a graduate assistant position in 2019. He was promoted to offensive analyst in 2020.

Hill was promoted to quarterbacks coach in 2021.

=== Arkansas State ===
On January 12, 2026, Hill was hired as the running backs coach for the Arkansas State Red Wolves.

== Personal life ==
His father, Ken Hill, played in Major League Baseball from 1988 to 2001.

=== Nickname ===
Following Hill's huge performance against South Carolina, his predecessor, Johnny Manziel, who went by the nickname "Johnny Football" in college, called Hill "Kenny Football," along with a number of fans. Hill, however, said that the name belonged to Manziel, and instead asked to be called "Kenny Trill," with "trill" being a combination of true and real. On September 11, 2014, Hill's family filed for the trademark of the name.

=== March 2014 arrest ===
On March 28, 2014, before he was chosen as Texas A&M's starting quarterback, Hill was arrested on a public intoxication charge outside of a restaurant bar in College Station, Texas. Police said Hill was unable to tell them where he was and when asked who the current president of the United States was, Hill reportedly answered “Bush” (who had not been president since 2009, after whom the current president was Barack Obama) and told officers his name was “Kennedy”. Hill later posted bail and was released from jail. Texas A&M's athletic department suspended Hill indefinitely from athletic activities afterwards. Hill eventually regained the favor of his team and head coach Kevin Sumlin and was named the starting quarterback for the 2014 season.
