= 2016 TCU Horned Frogs football team =

American college football season

2016 TCU Horned Frogs football

Liberty Bowl, L 23–31 vs. Georgia
- Conference: Big 12 Conference
- Record: 6–7 (4–5 Big 12)
- Head coach: Gary Patterson (16th season)
- Co-offensive coordinators: Doug Meacham (3rd season); Sonny Cumbie (3rd season)
- Offensive scheme: Air raid
- Defensive coordinator: Chad Glasgow (2nd season)
- Base defense: 4–2–5
- Home stadium: Amon G. Carter Stadium

2016 Big 12 Conference football standings
	Conf.			Overall
Team	W		L	W		L
No. 5 Oklahoma $	9	–	0	11	–	2
No. 11 Oklahoma State	7	–	2	10	–	3
No. 18 West Virginia	7	–	2	10	–	3
Kansas State	6	–	3	9	–	4
TCU	4	–	5	6	–	7
Baylor	3	–	6	7	–	6
Texas	3	–	6	5	–	7
Texas Tech	3	–	6	5	–	7
Iowa State	2	–	7	3	–	9
Kansas	1	–	8	2	–	10
$ – Conference champion; Rankings from AP Poll

The 2016 Texas Christian Horned Frogs football team represented Texas Christian University (TCU) in the 2016 NCAA Division I FBS football season. The 121st TCU football team played as a member of the Big 12 Conference (Big 12) and played their home games at Amon G. Carter Stadium, on the TCU campus in Fort Worth, Texas. The Horned Frogs were led by 16th-year head coach Gary Patterson, the winningest coach in TCU football history. They finished the season 6–7, 4–5 in Big 12 play to finish in fifth place. They were invited to the Liberty Bowl where they lost to Georgia.

== Preseason ==
=== Departures ===
Senior quarterback and 2014 Big 12 Offensive Player of the Year and 2015 runner-up Trevone Boykin and unanimous first team All-American wide receiver Josh Doctson led a large class of graduating seniors that departed TCU at the conclusion of the 2015 season.

=== Recruiting class ===
TCU inked five junior college transfers in December 2015, including 4-star defensive end Mat Boesen (Long Beach C.C.), 4-star linebacker Tyree Horton, 4-star safety Markell Simmons (Pima C.C.), 4-star wide receiver Taj Williams (Iowa Western C.C.), and 3-star offensive tackle Chris Gaynor (Dodge City C.C.). Four of the five junior college transfers enrolled at TCU in January 2016, will participate in spring practice and will be eligible to play in 2016. The fifth signee, Tyree Horton, is expected to enroll in the summer. TCU added a sixth junior college transfer, 4-star wide receiver Ryan Parker (Tyler J.C.), on February 3, 2016; Parker is expected to enroll in the summer.

Four of TCU's freshmen signees arrived early for the spring term at TCU and enrolled with the four January junior college transfers. The January freshmen enrollees include 4-star wide receiver Isaiah Graham (Bastrop, LA), 4-star athlete (running back and linebacker) Sewo Olonilua (Humble Kingwood), 3-star tight end Artayvious Lynn (Milford Academy), and 3-star quarterback Brennen Wooten (San Angelo Central).

The Frogs added a late signee in July. In the wake of the Baylor sexual assault scandal and firing of Art Briles, Baylor released 4-star defensive end Brandon Bowen from his National Letter of Intent, and Bowen signed with the TCU.

TCU signed the following 23 recruits, which combined to be a unanimous top-25 class, ranked as high as 13:

College recruiting information (2016)
Name	Hometown	School	Height	Weight	Commit date
Darius Anderson; RB	Rosenberg, TX	George Ranch H.S.	5 ft 11 in (1.80 m)	196 lb (89 kg)	Jan 20, 2016
Darius Anderson; RB	Recruit ratings: Scout: Rivals: 247Sports: ESPN:				
Ross Blacklock; DT	Missouri City, TX	Elkins H.S.	6 ft 4 in (1.93 m)	326 lb (148 kg)	Jan 9, 2016
Ross Blacklock; DT	Recruit ratings: Scout: Rivals: 247Sports: ESPN:				
Mat Boesen; DE	Torrance, CA	Long Beach C.C.	6 ft 3 in (1.91 m)	235 lb (107 kg)	Aug 20, 2015
Mat Boesen; DE	Recruit ratings: Scout: Rivals: 247Sports: ESPN:				
Brandon Bowen; DE	Trophy Club, TX	Byron Nelson H.S.	6 ft 5 in (1.96 m)	227 lb (103 kg)	Jul 6, 2016
Brandon Bowen; DE	Recruit ratings: Scout: Rivals: 247Sports: ESPN:				
Isaiah Chambers; DE	Houston, TX	Aldine MacArthur H.S.	6 ft 3.5 in (1.92 m)	258 lb (117 kg)	Sep 25, 2015
Isaiah Chambers; DE	Recruit ratings: Scout: Rivals: 247Sports: ESPN:				
Innis Gaines; S	Beaumont, TX	West Brook H.S.	6 ft 2 in (1.88 m)	190 lb (86 kg)	Nov 14, 2015
Innis Gaines; S	Recruit ratings: Scout: Rivals: 247Sports: ESPN:				
Chris Gaynor; OT	Pompano Beach, FL	Dodge City C.C.	6 ft 5 in (1.96 m)	290 lb (130 kg)	Dec 13, 2015
Chris Gaynor; OT	Recruit ratings: Scout: Rivals: 247Sports: ESPN:				
Isaiah Graham; WR	Bastrop, LA	Bastrop H.S.	6 ft 1 in (1.85 m)	185 lb (84 kg)	Oct 30, 2015
Isaiah Graham; WR	Recruit ratings: Scout: Rivals: 247Sports: ESPN:				
Kellton Hollins; OG	Zachary, LA	Zachary H.S.	6 ft 3 in (1.91 m)	298 lb (135 kg)	Jun 8, 2015
Kellton Hollins; OG	Recruit ratings: Scout: Rivals: 247Sports: ESPN:				
Tyree Horton; LB	Homestead, FL	Highland C.C.	6 ft 0 in (1.83 m)	225 lb (102 kg)	Dec 16, 2015
Tyree Horton; LB	Recruit ratings: Scout: Rivals: 247Sports: ESPN:				
Artayvious Lynn; TE	Bossier City, LA	Milford Academy	6 ft 6 in (1.98 m)	235 lb (107 kg)	Dec 6, 2015
Artayvious Lynn; TE	Recruit ratings: Scout: Rivals: 247Sports: ESPN:				
Austin Myers; OT	Manvel, TX	Manvel H.S.	6 ft 5 in (1.96 m)	295 lb (134 kg)	Feb 21, 2015
Austin Myers; OT	Recruit ratings: Scout: Rivals: 247Sports: ESPN:				
Lucas Niang; OT	New Canaan, CT	New Canaan H.S.	6 ft 6 in (1.98 m)	295 lb (134 kg)	Jan 25, 2016
Lucas Niang; OT	Recruit ratings: Scout: Rivals: 247Sports: ESPN:				
Sewo Olonilua; ATH	Humble, TX	Kingwood H.S.	6 ft 2 in (1.88 m)	217 lb (98 kg)	Dec 6, 2014
Sewo Olonilua; ATH	Recruit ratings: Scout: Rivals: 247Sports: ESPN:				
Gary Overshown; DE	Mesquite, TX	Horn H.S.	6 ft 5 in (1.96 m)	241 lb (109 kg)	Jun 22, 2015
Gary Overshown; DE	Recruit ratings: Scout: Rivals: 247Sports: ESPN:				
Ryan Parker; WR	Keller, TX	Tyler J.C.	6 ft 2 in (1.88 m)	180 lb (82 kg)	Feb 3, 2016
Ryan Parker; WR	Recruit ratings: Scout: Rivals: 247Sports: ESPN:				
Vernon Scott; CB	Mansfield, TX	Mansfield Summit H.S.	6 ft 2 in (1.88 m)	200 lb (91 kg)	Jul 25, 2015
Vernon Scott; CB	Recruit ratings: Scout: Rivals: 247Sports: ESPN:				
Markell Simmons; S	Tucson, AZ	Pima C.C.	6 ft 1 in (1.85 m)	190 lb (86 kg)	Dec 21, 2015
Markell Simmons; S	Recruit ratings: Scout: Rivals: 247Sports: ESPN:				
KeShawn Somerville; CB	Pflugerville, TX	Hendrickson H.S.	5 ft 10 in (1.78 m)	170 lb (77 kg)	Dec 8, 2015
KeShawn Somerville; CB	Recruit ratings: Scout: Rivals: 247Sports: ESPN:				
Dylan Thomas; ATH	Fort Worth, TX	Paschal H.S.	6 ft 1 in (1.85 m)	186 lb (84 kg)	Dec 3, 2014
Dylan Thomas; ATH	Recruit ratings: Scout: Rivals: 247Sports: ESPN:				
Camron Williams; ATH	Dallas, TX	Skyline H.S.	6 ft 3 in (1.91 m)	210 lb (95 kg)	Jan 24, 2016
Camron Williams; ATH	Recruit ratings: Scout: Rivals: 247Sports: ESPN:				
Taj Williams; WR	Tallahassee, FL	Iowa Western C.C.	6 ft 3 in (1.91 m)	180 lb (82 kg)	May 30, 2015
Taj Williams; WR	Recruit ratings: Scout: Rivals: 247Sports: ESPN:				
Brennen Wooten; QB	San Angelo, TX	Central H.S.	6 ft 1 in (1.85 m)	188 lb (85 kg)	Jul 24, 2014
Brennen Wooten; QB	Recruit ratings: Scout: Rivals: 247Sports: ESPN:				
Overall recruit ranking: Scout: 13 Rivals: 20 247Sports: 18 ESPN: 23
Note: In many cases, Scout, Rivals, 247Sports, On3, and ESPN may conflict in their listings of height and weight.; In these cases, the average was taken. ESPN grades are on a 100-point scale.; Sources: "2016 TCU Football Commitment List". Rivals.; "2016 Player Commitments – TCU". ESPN.; "2016 Team Ranking". Rivals.com.

=== Incoming transfers ===
In addition to the 2016 recruiting class, TCU added six transfers, including three eligible for the current season, to the 2016 roster:

List of incoming transfers
Name	Pos.	Eligible Beginning	Years of Eligibility	Previous School	Notes
John Diarse	WR	2016	2	LSU	Transferred in January 2016 after graduating from LSU. In 2013, Diarse was a 4-star recruit out of Neville H.S. in Monroe, LA.
Derrick Green	RB	2016	1	Michigan	Transferred in summer 2016 after graduating from Michigan. In 2013, Green was a 4-star recruit and named to the ESPN 300.
Cole Hunt	TE	2016	2	Rice	Transferred after graduating from Rice; Hunt is the younger brother of former TCU center Joey Hunt.
Ben Banogu	DE	2017	2	ULM	Transferred in January 2016. In 2014, Banogu was a 2-star recruit out of Prosper H.S. in Prosper, TX.
Andrew David	PK/P	2017	3	Michigan	Transferred in fall 2016.
Blake Hickey	OL	2017	4	Kansas State	Transferred in fall 2016 as a preferred walk on after enrolling at K-State during the summer. In 2016, Hickey was a 3-star recruit.

=== Coaching staff ===
Co-defensive coordinator and linebackers coach DeMontie Cross left TCU after the 2016 Alamo Bowl to accept the sole defensive coordinator position at Missouri, where Cross played from 1994–96. Despite anticipated turnover on the TCU coaching staff as a result of the Horned Frogs' successes, particularly their offensive turnaround in 2014 and 2015, Cross was the only position or coordinator-level coach to depart Fort Worth. Former TCU and NFL defensive lineman Zarnell Fitch was promoted to defensive line Coach after serving as the Frogs' director of high school relations from June 2014 through January 2016, and former TCU and NFL linebacker Jason Phillips will continue his work at TCU as a graduate assistant and coach linebackers. The 2016 staff was completed with the promotion of graduate assistant Jake Brown as the new director of high school relations and recruiting.

In November 2015, TCU co-offensive coordinator/play-caller and inside wide receivers coach Doug Meacham was named a finalist for the head coaching job at the University of North Texas, and the Fort Worth Star-Telegram reported Meacham was expected to receive and accept an offer; but on December 1, Meacham withdrew his name from consideration for the post. Meacham was also rumored to be named the new head coach at Tulane in December 2015, but the rumors were quashed by Meaham and TCU and Meacham was not named as the Green Wave's new coach. In January 2016, Meacham declined an offer to become the head coach of the Texas State Bobcats and an offer to become the sole offensive coordinator at Texas A&M.

In December 2015, TCU co-offensive coordinator and quarterbacks coach Sonny Cumbie was reportedly offered a three-year, $1+ million per year contract to become the sole offensive coordinator and play caller at the University of Texas. Despite an intense public effort by Longhorns' head coach Charlie Strong, Cumbie declined the offer and elected to remain in his role at TCU.

Frogs' running backs coach Curtis Luper was reportedly a finalist for the head coaching job at ULM, but he withdrew his name from consideration on the same day Sonny Cumbie declined the offensive coordinator position at Texas and Doug Meacham quashed rumors regarding the head coaching job at Tulane. Luper was also a candidate for the head coaching job at UTSA and interviewed for the job on January 10 before eventually removing his name from consideration.

In January 2016, offensive graduate assistant Bryson Oliver left TCU to accept a full-time coaching job at Tarleton State, and former Oklahoma State quarterback J. W. Walsh joined the Horned Frogs as a new offensive graduate assistant.

=== Spring practice ===
The 2016 Horned Frogs opened spring practice on February 27, 2016. Over the course of the 15 practices in 5 weeks, Patterson praised the efforts of all junior college transfer early enrollees and addressed concerns at defensive tackle and noted development at linebacker with players' return from or experience gained as a result of others' injury. Entering spring question, the Frogs' biggest question mark was at starting quarterback. After the spring game on April 1, highlighted by the play of defensive ends and cornerbacks, starting quarterback contenders Kenny Hill and Foster Sawyer both remained listed as possible starters on the post-spring depth chart.

=== Fall camp ===
Big 12 media days were held in Dallas, Texas, on July 18 and 19. Prior to media days, Kenny Hill was named Big 12 Preseason Newcomer of the Year and Josh Carraway, James McFarland and KaVontae Turpin were named to the Preseason All-Big 12 football team. The Frogs were also picked by the Big 12 media to finish second in the conference standings and received 2 first place votes, with the remainder going to top-picked OU.

Players reported for fall camp on August 3, and the first practice was held August 4. Head coach Gary Patterson named redshirt sophomore Kenny Hill the starting quarterback on August 25, 2016.

== Schedule ==
Date	Time	Opponent	Rank	Site	TV	Result	Attendance
September 3	7:00 p.m.	No. 8 (FCS) South Dakota State *	No. 13	Amon G. Carter Stadium; Fort Worth, TX	FSN	W 59–41	43,450
September 10	6:00 p.m.	Arkansas*	No. 15	Amon G. Carter Stadium; Fort Worth, TX	ESPN	L 38–41 ^{2OT}	48,091
September 17	11:00 a.m.	Iowa State^{†}		Amon G. Carter Stadium; Fort Worth, TX	FS1	W 41–20	45,000
September 23	7:00 p.m.	at SMU*		Gerald J. Ford Stadium; University Park, TX (Battle for the Iron Skillet)	ESPN	W 33–3	30,987
October 1	4:00 p.m.	Oklahoma	No. 21	Amon G. Carter Stadium; Fort Worth, TX	FOX	L 46–52	45,000
October 8	11:00 a.m.	at Kansas		Memorial Stadium; Lawrence, KS	ESPNU	W 24–23	23,946
October 22	2:30 p.m.	at No. 12 West Virginia		Mountaineer Field; Morgantown, WV	ABC/ESPN2	L 10–34	61,780
October 29	2:30 p.m.	Texas Tech		Amon G. Carter Stadium; Fort Worth, TX (rivalry)	ESPN2	L 24–27 ^{2OT}	45,619
November 5	2:30 p.m.	at No. 13 Baylor		McLane Stadium; Waco, TX (The Revivalry)	FOX	W 62–22	48,129
November 19	11:00 a.m.	No. 13 Oklahoma State		Amon G. Carter Stadium; Fort Worth, TX	FS1	L 6–31	43,303
November 25	2:30 p.m.	at Texas		Darrell K Royal–Texas Memorial Stadium; Austin, TX (rivalry)	FS1	W 31–9	99,065
December 3	11:00 a.m.	Kansas State		Amon G. Carter Stadium; Fort Worth, TX	FS1	L 6–30	42,746
December 30	11:00 a.m.	vs. Georgia*		Liberty Bowl Memorial Stadium; Memphis, TN (Liberty Bowl)	ESPN	L 23–31	51,087
*Non-conference game; ^{†}Homecoming; Rankings from AP Poll released prior to the game

All times Central

== Rankings ==
Ranking movements Legend: ██ Increase in ranking ██ Decrease in ranking — = Not ranked RV = Received votes
	Week															
Poll	Pre	1	2	3	4	5	6	7	8	9	10	11	12	13	14	Final
AP	13	15	RV	RV	21	RV	RV	RV	—	—	—	—	—	—	—	—
Coaches	14	12	RV	21	19	RV	RV	RV	—	—	—	—	—	—	—	—
CFP	Not released									—	—	—	—	—	—	Not released

== Personnel ==
=== Roster ===
2016 TCU Horned Frogs football team roster
Players
Coaches
Offense }

Pos.	#	Name	Class
WR	1	Emanuel Porter	Jr
WR	2	Taj Williams	Jr
RB	3	Shaun Nixon (injured)	So
WR	4	Isaiah Graham (injured)	Fr
RB	6	Darius Anderson	Fr
QB	7	Kenny Hill	Jr
WR	9	John Diarse	Jr
WR	10	Desmon White	Jr
WR	11	Dylan Thomas	Fr
QB	12	Foster Sawyer	So
WR	13	Ty Slanina	Jr
WR	14	Jarrison Stewart	So
WR	15	Jaelan Austin	So
QB	16	Brennen Wooten	Fr
QB	17	Grayson Muehlstein	So
QB	18	Jordan Kitna	Fr
WR	19	Travis Hanes	Jr
WR	20	Deanté Gray	Sr
RB	21	Kyle Hicks	Jr
RB	24	Trevorris Johnson	Jr
WR	25	KaVontae Turpin	So
RB	27	Derrick Green	Sr
WR	28	Patrick Zeller	So
RB	33	Sewo Olonilua	Fr
WR	34	Preston Miller	Sr
WR	35	Armanii Glaspie	Fr
WR	38	Connor Osborne	Sr
WR	39	Isaiah Alexander	Jr
RB	39	Stacy Boyd	Sr
FB	42	Pakamiaiaea Davis	So
WR	43	Michael Carroll	So
TE	47	Daythan Davis (injured)	Jr
FB	50	Harrison Gillaspy	Jr
C	51	Austin Schlottmann	Jr
OT	52	Trey Elliott (injured)	So
OL	55	Kellton Hollins	Fr
OL	56	Austin Myers	Fr
G	57	Casey McDermott Vai	So
G	58	Patrick Morris	Jr
G	60	Nate Guyton	Fr
OT	62	David Bolisomi	Fr
C	63	Garrett Altman	Jr
G	64	Matt Pryor	Jr
OT	68	Joseph Noteboom	Jr
OT	69	Aviante Collins	Sr
G	70	Cordel Iwuagwu	Fr
C	73	Jozie Milton	Fr
G	74	Chris Gaynor	Jr
OL	75	Nick Cominos	Fr
OT	76	Sam Awolope	Fr
OL	77	Lucas Niang	Fr
WR	80	Robbie Fuelling	Jr
TE	81	Cole Hunt	Jr
TE	82	Charlie Reid	Jr
WR	83	Daniel Walsh	Jr
WR	84	Nathan Hernandez	Sr
TE	84	Cole Novak	Jr
WR	86	Daniel Walsh	Sr
WR	87	TreVontae Hights	Fr
TE	88	Artayvious Lynn	Fr

Defense

Pos.	#	Name	Class
S	2	Niko Small	So
S	3	Markell Simmons	So
S	6	Innis Gaines	Fr
S	7	Arico Evans	So
DE	9	Mat Boesen	Jr
CB	11	Ranthony Texada	Jr
CB	12	Jeff Gladney	Fr
S	16	Michael Jr. Downing	Jr
S	17	Kenny Iloka	Sr
CB	17	DeShawn Raymond	So
S	18	Nick Orr	Jr
LB	19	Montrel Wilson	So
S	21	Caylin Moore	Sr
CB	22	Cyd Calvin	Jr
LB	23	Alec Dunham	So
CB	24	Julius Lewis (injured)	So
CB	26	Vernon Scott	Fr
CB	28	Tony James	So
CB	29	Steve Wesley	Jr
S	30	Denzel Johnson	Jr
S	31	Ridwan Issahaku	So
LB	32	Travin Howard	Jr
LB	35	Sammy Douglas	Jr
DE	40	James McFarland	Sr
DE	41	Brandon Bowen	Fr
LB	42	Ty Summers	So
LB	43	Davis Devereaux	So
LB	44	Paul Whitmill	Jr
DE	47	Tipa Galeai	So
LB	48	Lucas Reynolds	Fr
S	48	Tanner Zang	So
DE	49	Semaj Thomas	Fr
LB	53	George Cullen	Jr
DT	54	Joseph Broadnax Jr.	So
DT	56	Chris Bradley	Jr
DT	67	Geatano Sinacola	Fr
DT	79	Robert Henson	Jr
DE	86	Gary Overshown	Fr
DT	90	Ross Blacklock	Fr
DT	91	L. J. Collier	So
DE	93	Ben Banogu	So
DE	94	Josh Carraway	Sr
DT	95	Aaron Curry	Sr
DT	97	James Jr. Terry	Fr
DE	99	Isaiah Chambers	Fr

Special teams

Pos.	#	Name	Class
PK	27	Brandon Hatfield	Jr
P	29	Adam Nunez	Fr
PK	36	Ryan Graf	Fr
PK	37	Cole Bunce	Fr
PK	46	Jonathan Song (injured)	So
LS	50	Donovan Cahill	Fr
LS	71	Matt Boggs	Jr

Head coach

- Gary Patterson (head coach, 16th season)

Coordinators/assistant coaches

- Doug Meacham (co-offensive coordinator/inside WRs, 3rd season)
- Sonny Cumbie (co-offensive coordinator/QBs, 3rd season)
- Chad Glasgow (defensive coordinator/safeties, 15th season)
- Jarrett Anderson (offensive line coach, 19th season)
- Rusty Burns (outside receivers coach, 8th season)
- Zarnell Fitch (defensive line coach, 3rd season)
- Paul Gonzales (cornerbacks coach, 5th season)
- Curtis Luper (running backs coach, 4th season)
- Dan Sharp (defensive line coach, 25th season)
- Eric Russell (director of player personnel–special teams, 1st season)
- Jason Phillips (graduate assistant–defense, 2nd season)
- J. W. Walsh (graduate assistant–offense, 1st season)
- Hudson Fuller (offensive analyst, 2nd season)
- Jeremy Modkins (defensive analyst, 3rd season)
- Jake Brown (director of high school relations, 3rd season)
- Matt Lewis (director–football operations, 14th season)
- Nelly Gonzalez (asst. director–football operations, 2nd season)
- Don Sommer (head strength & conditioning coach, 16th season)
- Matt Parker (associate strength & conditioning coach, 13th season)
- David Gable (assoc. director–sports medicine, 14th season)

Legend

- (C) Team captain
- (S) Suspended
- (I) Ineligible
- Injured
- Redshirt

Roster
Last update: August 29, 2016

=== Injury report ===
Player	Position	Status	Injury	Date of Injury	Game(s) Missed	Date of Return (Anticipated)
Julius Lewis	CB	Out	Unknown/Season-Ending	Offseason Workouts	All	(2017)
Shaun Nixon	RB	Out	Unknown/Season-Ending	Offseason Workouts	All	(2017)
Trey Elliott	OT	Out	Unknown/Season-Ending	Fall Camp	All	(2017)
Jonathan Song	PK	Out	Quad injury	Fall Camp	South Dakota St	(Mid-September or later)
Isaiah Graham	WR	Out	Unknown	South Dakota St	Arkansas	(Late September)
Travin Howard	LB	Returned	Unknown/hospitalization	Fall Camp	None	Late August

=== Depth chart ===
TBA

== Game summaries ==
=== South Dakota State ===
All-time record	Last meeting	Result
0–0	First meeting	N/A

South Dakota State Jackrabbits at TCU Horned Frogs – Game Summary

Quarter	1	2	3	4	Total
#8 (FCS) Jackrabbits	3	21	14	3	41
#13 Horned Frogs	7	17	21	14	59

at Amon G. Carter Stadium • Fort Worth, TX

- Date: September 3, 2016
- Game time: 7:00 p.m. CT (actual: 7:05 p.m – 10:55 p.m.)
- Game weather: Sunny and clear, 86°F, wind SE 9 mph
- Game attendance: 43,450
- Referee: Eddy Shelton • Umpire: Rick Podraza • Linesman: Rick Smith • Line judge: Scott Reilly • Back judge: Terry White • Field judge: Nick Lave • Side judge: Richard Corona • Center judge: Scott Jonson
- TV announcers (FSN): Mark Followill (play-by-play), Ben Leber (color), Lesley McCaslin (sideline)
- Sources: TCU Game Notes, GoFrogs.com

Game information

First Quarter

- 8:25 – TCU – Kyle Hick 15-yd run (Ryan Graf, kick), SDSU 0 – TCU 7
- 1:10 – SDSU – Chase Vinatieri 25-yd field goal, SDSU 3 – TCU 7

Second Quarter

- 11:34 – SDSU – Isaac Wallace 87-yd run (Chase Vinatieri, kick), SDSU 10 – TCU 7
- 9:55 – SDSU – Taryn Christon 12-yd run (Chase Vinatieri, kick), SDSU 17 – TCU 7
- 3:19 – TCU – KaVontae Turpin 81-yd punt return (Ryan Graf, kick), SDSU 17 – TCU 14
- 1:37 – TCU – Kenny Hill 4-yd run (Ryan Graf, kick), SDSU 17 – TCU 21
- 0:49 – SDSU – Jacob Wieneke 31-yd pass from Taryn Christon (Chase Vinatieri, kick), SDSU 24 – TCU 21
- 0:02 – TCU – Ryan Graf 32-yd field goal, SDSU 24 – TCU 24

Third Quarter

- 13:20 – TCU – Jaelan Austin 60-yd pass from Kenny Hill (Ryan Graf, kick), SDSU 24 – TCU 31
- 9:26 – SDSU – Dallas Goedert 16-yd pass from Taryn Christon (Chase Vinatieri, kick), SDSU 31 – TCU 31
- 6:40 – TCU – Kyle Hicks 3-yd run (Ryan Graf, kick), SDSU 31 – TCU 38
- 2:54 – TCU – Kenny Hill 6-yd run (Ryan Graf, kick), SDSU 31 – TCU 45
- 0:04 – SDSU – Jake Wieneke 34-yd pass from Taryn Christon (Chase Vinatieri, kick), SDSU 38 – TCU 45

Fourth Quarter

- 11:57 – SDSU – Chase Vinatieri 37-yd field goal, SDSU 41 – TCU 45
- 8:36 – TCU – Taj Williams 46-yd pass from Kenny Hill (Ryan Graf, kick), SDSU 41 – TCU 52
- 4:07 – TCU – Kenny Hill 8-yd run (Ryan Graf, kick), SDSU 41 – TCU 59

Top Passers

- SDSU – Taryn Christon: 19–30, 0 INT, 333 yds, 3 TD
- TCU – Kenny Hill: 33–49, 2 INT, 439 yds, 2 TD

Top Rushers

- SDSU – Issac Wallace: 7 rushes, 112 yards (16.0), 1 TD
- TCU – Kyle Hicks: 15 rushes, 59 yards (3.9), 2 TD

Top Receiving

- SDSU – Jake Wieneke: 8 receptions, 196 yards, 2 TD
- TCU – Taj Williams: 11 receptions, 158 yards, 1 TD

The 2016 Horned Frogs opened their season at home versus Division I–FCS opponent South Dakota State. The Jackrabbits play in the Missouri Valley Football Conference and finished the 2015 season with an 8–4 (5–3 MVFC) record. Ranked #10 in the final regular season FCS poll, the Jackrabbits were upset by the #16 Montana Grizzlies in the first round of the 2015 NCAA FCS Playoffs. The Jackrabbits were ranked as high as #8 in the 2016 preseason FCS polls.

=== Arkansas ===
All-time record	Last meeting	Result
23–43–2	1991	Arkansas, 22–21

Arkansas Razorbacks at TCU Horned Frogs – Game Summary

Quarter	1	2	3	4	OT	2OT	Total
Razorbacks	3	10	7	8	7	6	41
#15 Horned Frogs	0	0	7	21	7	3	38

at Amon G. Carter Stadium • Fort Worth, TX

- Date: September 10, 2016
- Game time: 6:00 p.m. CT
- Game attendance: 48,091
- TV announcers (ESPN): Joe Tessitore (play-by-play), Todd Blackledge (color), Holly Rowe (sideline)
- Sources: FOX Sports

Game information

First Quarter

- ARK FG: Cole Hedlund 38-yard field goal.

Second Quarter

- ARK FG: Cole Hedlund 27-yard field goal.
- ARK TD: Brooks Ellis 45-yard interception return (Cole Hedlund PAT good).

Third Quarter

- TCU TD: Kyle Hicks 9-yard rush (Ryan Graf PAT good).
- ARK TD: Austin Allen 13-yard pass to Drew Morgan (Cole Hedlund PAT good).

Fourth Quarter

- TCU TD: Kenny Hill 1-yard rush (Ryan Graf PAT good).
- TCU TD: Kyle Hicks 7-yard rush (Ryan Graf PAT good).
- TCU TD: Kenny Hill 5-yard rush (Ryan Graf PAT good).
- ARK TD: Austin Allen 16-yard pass to Keon Hatcher (2-pt conversion good).

Overtime

- ARK TD: Austin Allen 19-yard pass to Jeremy Sprinkle (Cole Hedlund PAT good).
- TCU TD: Kenny Hill 13-yard pass to Taj Williams (Ryan Graf PAT good).

2nd Overtime

- TCU FG: Ryan Graf 37-yard field goal.
- ARK TD: Austin Allen 5-yard rush.

Top Passers

- Arkansas – Austin Allen (17/29, 223 yds, 3 TD)
- TCU – Kenny Hill (36/56, 377 yds, 1 TD, 1 INT)

Top Rushers

- Arkansas – Rawleigh Williams III (28 att, 137 yds)
- TCU – Kenny Hill (15 att, 93 yds, 2 TD)

Top Receiving

- Arkansas – Drew Morgan (7 rec, 93 yds, 1 TD)
- TCU – KaVontae Turpin (7 rec, 126 yds)

The Razorbacks' trip to Fort Worth marked the first time the two former Southwest Conference rivals have met on the gridiron since Arkansas departed the SWC for the SEC in 1992, and the first matchup pitting TCU head coach Gary Patterson against Arkansas coach Bret Bielema since the two faced off in the 2011 Rose Bowl Game when Bielema coached the Wisconsin Badgers. The Horned Frogs' double overtime defeat snapped their 14-game home winning streak; their last loss at home came on November 30, 2013 to #9 Baylor.

=== Iowa State ===
All-time record	Big 12 record	Last meeting	Result
6–1	3–1	2015	TCU, 45–21

Iowa State Cyclones at TCU Horned Frogs – Game Summary

Quarter	1	2	3	4	Total
Cyclones	0	7	3	10	20
Horned Frogs	10	14	14	3	41

at Amon G. Carter Stadium • Fort Worth, TX

- Date: September 17, 2016
- Game time: 11:00 a.m. CT
- Game attendance: 45,119
- Referee: C. Castleberry
- TV announcers (FS1): TBA (play-by-play), TBA (color), TBA (sideline)
- Sources: Gofrogs.com Cyclones.com

Game information

First Quarter

- TCU - 11:48 Ryan Graf 37 yd field goal (TCU 3-0)
- TCU - 05:32 Kyle Hicks 65 yd run; Ryan Graf XP good (TCU 10-0)

Second Quarter

- ISU - 12:18 Joel Lanning 8 yd run; Cole Netton XP good (TCU 10-7)
- TCU - 07:22 Kenny Hill 1 yd run; Ryan Graf XP good (TCU 17-7)
- TCU - 00:48 Derrick Green 1 yd run; Ryan Graf XP good (TCU 24-7)

Third Quarter

- TCU - 11:55 Kyle Hicks 25 yd pass from Kenny Hill; Ryan Graf XP good (TCU 31-7)
- ISU - 07:51 Cole Netten 25 yd field goal (TCU 31-10)
- TCU - 01:08 Trevorris Johnson 2 yd run; Ryan Graf XP good (TCU 38-10)

Fourth Quarter

- TCU - 10:37 Brandon Hatfield 37 yd field goal (TCU 41-10)
- ISU - 06:41 Joel Lanning 1 yd run; Cole Netton XP good (TCU 41-17)
- ISU - 01:29 Cole Netton 30 yd field goal (TCU 41-20)

Top Passers

- ISU – Joel Lanning 12/21, 127 yds
- TCU – Kenny Hill 19/30, 219 yds, 1 TD

Top Rushers

- ISU – Mike Warren 23 attempts, 95 yds
- TCU – Kyle Hicks 12 attempts, 117 yds, 1 TD

Top Receiving

- ISU – Trever Ryen 6 receptions, 58 yds
- TCU – John Diarse 7 receptions, 97 yds

The Horned Frogs and Cyclones conference opener in Fort Worth marked new Cyclones head coach Matt Campbell's debut in Big 12 Conference play.

=== SMU ===
All-time record	Last meeting	Result
48–40–7	2015	TCU, 56–37

TCU Horned Frogs at SMU Mustangs – Game Summary

Quarter	1	2	3	4	Total
Horned Frogs	3	3	14	13	33
Mustangs	3	0	0	0	3

at Gerald J. Ford Stadium • University Park, TX

- Date: September 23, 2016
- Game time: 7:00 p.m. CT
- Game attendance: 30,987
- TV announcers (ESPN): TBA (play-by-play), TBA (color), TBA (sideline)

Game information

First Quarter
Second Quarter
Third Quarter
Fourth Quarter

Top Passers

- TCU –
- SMU –

Top Rushers

- TCU –
- SMU –

Top Receiving

- TCU –
- SMU –

The Horned Frogs returned to and closed non-conference play in the 96th Battle for the Iron Skillet. The game against the Mustangs was the Frogs' first road game of 2016 and the second of five games against former Southwest Conference foes in 2016.

=== Oklahoma ===
All-time record	Big 12 record	Last meeting	Result
5–10	1–3	2015	Oklahoma, 30–29

Oklahoma Sooners at TCU Horned Frogs – Game Summary

Quarter	1	2	3	4	Total
Sooners	7	28	14	3	52
#21 Horned Frogs	21	3	0	22	46

at Amon G. Carter Stadium • Fort Worth, TX

- Date: October 1, 2016
- TV announcers: TBA (play-by-play), TBA (color), TBA (sideline)

Game information

First Quarter
Second Quarter
Third Quarter
Fourth Quarter

Top Passers

- OU – Baker Mayfield 23/30 274 yds 2 TD
- TCU – Kenny Hill 26/44 449 yds 5 TD 1 INT

Top Rushers

- OU – Joe Mixon 16 attempts 105 yds 1 TD
- TCU – Kyle Hicks 15 attempts 61 yds 1 TD

Top Receiving

- OU – Dede Westbrook 7 receptions 158 yds 2 TD
- TCU – Taj Williams 5 receptions 210 yds 2 TD

The winner of the 2014 and 2015 TCU–Oklahoma matchups went on to win at least a share of the years' Big 12 Conference Championships. In 2014, a late pick-six helped TCU secure a victory, and the Frogs went on to split the 2014 Big 12 title with Baylor. In 2015, Oklahoma deflected a go-ahead TCU two-point conversion attempt in the final seconds of the game in Norman, and the Sooners went on to win the Big 12 title and represent the conference in the College Football Playoff.

=== Kansas ===
All-time record	Big 12 record	Last meeting	Result
20–8–4	4–0	2015	TCU, 23–17

TCU Horned Frogs at Kansas Jayhawks – Game Summary

Quarter	1	2	3	4	Total
Horned Frogs	0	14	0	10	24
Jayhawks	7	3	13	0	23

at Memorial Stadium • Lawrence, KS

- Date: October 8, 2016
- TV announcers: TBA (play-by-play), TBA (color), TBA (sideline)

Game information

First Quarter
Second Quarter
Third Quarter
Fourth Quarter

Top Passers

- TCU –
- KU –

Top Rushers

- TCU –
- KU –

Top Receiving

- TCU –
- KU –

The Horned Frogs left the Fort Worth–Dallas metroplex for the first time in the 2016 season to face Big 12 foe Kansas. The Frogs were 4–0 versus the Jayhawks in Big 12 Conference play, but despite being a heavy favorite in each matchup, they had only won the four meetings by a combined 34 points. TCU, ranked in the top 15 during the 2014 and 2015 games, narrowly escaped the Jayhawks with less than one-score win margins.

=== West Virginia ===
All-time record	Big 12 record	Last meeting	Result
3–2	3–1	2015	TCU, 40–10

TCU Horned Frogs at West Virginia Mountaineers – Game Summary

Quarter	1	2	3	4	Total
Horned Frogs	3	7	0	0	10
#12 Mountaineers	14	7	10	3	34

at Mountaineer Field at Milan Puskar Stadium • Morgantown, WV

- Date: October 22, 2016
- TV announcers: TBA (play-by-play), TBA (color), TBA (sideline)

Game information

First Quarter
Second Quarter
Third Quarter
Fourth Quarter

Top Passers

- TCU –
- WVU –

Top Rushers

- TCU –
- WVU –

Top Receiving

- TCU –
- WVU –

=== Texas Tech ===
All-time record	Big 12 record	Last meeting	Result
25–30–3	2–2	2015	TCU, 55–52

Texas Tech Red Raiders at TCU Horned Frogs – Game Summary

Quarter	1	2	3	4	OT	2OT	Total
Red Raiders	0	10	0	7	7	3	27
Horned Frogs	7	3	0	7	7	0	24

at Amon G. Carter Stadium, Fort Worth, TX

- Date: October 29
- Game time: 2:30 p.m.
- Game weather: Temperature: 85 °F (29 °C) • weather: sunny with some clouds
- Game attendance: 45,619
- TV: ESPN2

Game information

First quarter

- TCU 4:40 – Derrick Green 2 yard run (Brandon Hatfield kick), TCU 7–0

Second quarter

- TTU 13:23 – Reggie Davis 33 yard pass from Patrick Mahomes (Clayton Hatfield kick), tied 7–7
- TCU 9:33 – Brandon Hatfield 23 yard field goal, TCU 10–7
- TTU 6:49 – Clayton Hatfield 41 yard field goal, tied 10–10

Third quarter

- No scoring plays

Fourth quarter

- TCU 14:37 – Trevorris Johnson 1 yard run (Brandon Hatfield kick), TCU 17–10
- TTU 1:28 – Dylan Cantrell 8 yard pass from Patrick Mahomes (Clayton Hatfield kick), tied 17–17

Overtime

- TTU – Patrick Mahomes 15 yard run (Clayton Hatfield kick), TTU 24–17
- TCU – Desmon White 25 yard pass from Foster Sawyer (Brandon Hatfield kick), tied 24–24

Second overtime

- TTU – Clayton Hatfield 37 yard field goal, TTU 27–24

Leading Passers

- TTU – Patrick Mahomes 24/39, 206 yards, 2 TD, INT
- TCU – Kenny Hill 16/29, 160 yards, INT

Leading Rushers

- TTU – Da'Leon Ward 23 carries, 98 yards
- TCU – Sewo Olonilua 7 carries, 48 yards

Leading Receivers

- TTU – Da'Leon Ward 8 receptions, 49 yards
- TCU – Taj Williams 4 receptions, 52 yards

=== Baylor ===
All-time record	Big 12 record	Last meeting	Result
52–52–7	2–2	2015	TCU, 28–21

TCU Horned Frogs at Baylor Bears – Game Summary

Quarter	1	2	3	4	Total
Horned Frogs	10	28	10	14	62
#13 Bears	7	7	0	8	22

at McLane Stadium • Waco, TX

- Date: November 5, 2016
- TV announcers: TBA (play-by-play), TBA (color), TBA (sideline)

Game information

First Quarter
Second Quarter
Third Quarter
Fourth Quarter

Top Passers

- TCU –
- Baylor –

Top Rushers

- TCU –
- Baylor –

Top Receiving

- TCU –
- Baylor –

=== Oklahoma State ===
All-time record	Big 12 record	Last meeting	Result
10–14–2	1–3	2015	Oklahoma State, 49–29

Oklahoma State Cowboys at TCU Horned Frogs – Game Summary

Quarter	1	2	3	4	Total
#13 Cowboys	7	3	14	7	31
Horned Frogs	6	0	0	0	6

at Amon G. Carter Stadium • Fort Worth, TX

- Date: November 19, 2016
- TV announcers: TBA (play-by-play), TBA (color), TBA (sideline)

Game information

First Quarter
Second Quarter
Third Quarter
Fourth Quarter

Top Passers

- OSU –
- TCU –

Top Rushers

- OSU –
- TCU –

Top Receiving

- OSU –
- TCU –

=== Texas ===
All-time record	Big 12 record	Last meeting	Result
23–62–1	3–1	2015	TCU, 50–7

TCU Horned Frogs at Texas Longhorns – Game Summary

Quarter	1	2	3	4	Total
Horned Frogs	7	0	10	14	31
Longhorns	3	3	3	0	9

at Darrell K Royal–Texas Memorial Stadium • Austin, TX

- Date: November 25, 2016
- Game time: 2:30 p.m. CT
- TV announcers: TBA (play-by-play), TBA (color), TBA (sideline)

Game information

First Quarter
Second Quarter
Third Quarter
Fourth Quarter

Top Passers

- TCU –
- Texas –

Top Rushers

- TCU –
- Texas –

Top Receiving

- TCU –
- Texas –

Since TCU joined the Big 12 in 2012, every TCU–Texas game in Austin had been held on Thanksgiving weekend. The first two contests were held on Thanksgiving night, with the Horned Frogs winning both. The Longhorns failed to cut into TCU's 3–1 Big 12 record over the Longhorns on Black Friday afternoon in Austin.

=== Kansas State ===
All-time record	Big 12 record	Last meeting	Result
5–4	2–2	2015	TCU, 52–45

Kansas State Wildcats at TCU Horned Frogs – Game Summary

Quarter	1	2	3	4	Total
Wildcats	3	7	13	7	30
Horned Frogs	3	3	0	0	6

at Amon G. Carter Stadium • Fort Worth, TX

- Date: December 3, 2016
- TV announcers: TBA (play-by-play), TBA (color), TBA (sideline)

Game information

First Quarter
Second Quarter
Third Quarter
Fourth Quarter

Top Passers

- KSU –
- TCU –

Top Rushers

- KSU –
- TCU –

Top Receiving

- KSU –
- TCU –

=== Georgia–Liberty Bowl ===
All-time record	Last meeting	Result
0–3	1988	Georgia, 38–10

Liberty Bowl – Game Summary

Quarter	1	2	3	4	Total
Bulldogs	7	7	7	10	31
Horned Frogs	9	7	7	0	23

at Liberty Bowl Memorial Stadium • Memphis, TN

- Date: December 30, 2016
- Game time: 11:00 a.m. CT
- TV announcers: Beth Mowins (play-by-play), Anthony Becht (color), Rocky Boiman (sideline)

Game information

First Quarter
Second Quarter
Third Quarter
Fourth Quarter

Top Passers

- UGA –
- TCU –

Top Rushers

- UGA –
- TCU –

Top Receiving

- UGA –
- TCU –

== Honors and awards ==
=== Preseason awards ===
Josh Carraway

- Preseason All-Big 12 Team (DL)

Kenny Hill

- Big 12 Preseason Newcomer of the Year

James McFarland

- Preseason All-Big 12 Team (DL)

KaVontae Turpin

- Preseason All-Big 12 Team (KR/PR)

=== Award watch lists ===
Josh Carraway: Chuck Bednarik Award Watch List; Lott IMPACT Trophy Watch List; Bronko Nagurski Trophy Watch List; Aaron Curry: Wuerffel Trophy Watch List; Deanté Gray: Maxwell Award Watch List; Kyle Hicks: Doak Walker Award Candidate	Travin Howard: Chuck Bednarik Award Watch List; Butkus Award Watch List; Bronko Nagurski Trophy Watch List; James McFarland: Chuck Bednarik Award Watch List; Lott IMPACT Trophy Watch List; Caylin Moore: AFCA Good Works Team Nominee	Gary Patterson: Dodd Trophy Watch List; Austin Schlottmann: Rimington Trophy Watch List; KaVontae Turpin: Paul Hornung Award Watch List; Maxwell Award Watch List

=== Weekly awards ===
Kenny Hill

- Big 12 Co-offensive Player of the Week (vs. South Dakota State, week 1)

KaVontae Turpin

- Big 12 Special Teams Player of the Week (vs. South Dakota State, week 1)
