= Justin Robinson =

Justin Robinson may refer to:

- Justin Robinson (basketball, born 1987), British basketball player; in college played for Rider (2007–11)
- Justin Robinson (basketball, born 1995), American basketball player; in college played for Monmouth (2013–17)
- Justin Robinson (basketball, born 1996), American basketball player for Mornar Bar
- Justin Robinson (basketball, born 1997), American basketball player; in college played for Virginia Tech (2015–19)
- Justin Robinson (musician) (born 1968), American saxophonist
- Justin Robinson (sprinter) (born 2002), American sprinter
