= 2016 Liberty Bowl (December) =

2016 AutoZone Liberty Bowl
- 58th Liberty Bowl
Georgia Bulldogs	TCU Horned Frogs
(7–5)	(6–6)
SEC	Big 12
31	23
Head coach: Kirby Smart	Head coach: Gary Patterson
	1	2	3	4	Total
Georgia	7	7	7	10	31
TCU	9	7	7	0	23
- Date: December 30, 2016
- Season: 2016
- Stadium: Liberty Bowl Memorial Stadium
- Location: Memphis, Tennessee
- MVP: Trenton Thompson (DT, Georgia)
- Favorite: Georgia by 1
- Referee: Michael Batlan (Pac-12)
- Attendance: 51,087
- Payout: US$1,437,500

United States TV coverage
- Network: ESPN/ESPN Radio
- Announcers: TV: Beth Mowins, Anthony Becht, Rocky Boiman; Radio: Bill Roth, Al Groh, Alex Corddry

The 2016 Liberty Bowl was a post-season American college football bowl game played on December 30, 2016, at Liberty Bowl Memorial Stadium in Memphis, Tennessee. The 58th edition of the Liberty Bowl featured the Georgia Bulldogs of the Southeastern Conference against the TCU Horned Frogs of the Big 12 Conference. It was one of the 2016–17 bowl games concluding the 2016 FBS football season. Sponsored by automobile parts and accessories store AutoZone, it was officially known as the AutoZone Liberty Bowl.

== Teams ==
The game featured conference tie-ins from the Southeastern Conference and the Big 12 Conference.

== Game summary ==
=== Scoring summary ===
Scoring summary

Quarter	Time	Drive			Team	Scoring information	Score	
Quarter	Time	Plays	Yards	TOP	Team	Scoring information	UGA	TCU
1	9:32	5	86	2:55	UGA	Sony Michel 4-yard touchdown run, Rodrigo Blankenship kick good	7	0
1	0:44	14	66	5:27	TCU	40-yard field goal by Brandon Hatfield	7	3
1	0:02	2	21	0:27	TCU	Kenny Hill 10-yard touchdown run, Brandon Hatfield kick failed	7	9
2	9:15	5	45	0:56	TCU	John Diarse 10-yard touchdown reception from Kenny Hill, Brandon Hatfield kick good	7	16
2	1:13	9	76	4:12	UGA	Sony Michel 33-yard touchdown reception from Jacob Eason, Rodrigo Blankenship kick good	14	16
3	7:08	12	52	6:36	UGA	Javon Wims 4-yard touchdown reception from Jacob Eason, Rodrigo Blankenship kick good	21	16
3	2:07	11	56	5:00	TCU	John Diarse 9-yard touchdown reception from Kenny Hill, Brandon Hatfield kick good	21	23
4	13:27	7	56	3:41	UGA	30-yard field goal by Rodrigo Blankenship	24	23
4	2:48	9	70	5:09	UGA	Nick Chubb 13-yard touchdown run, Rodrigo Blankenship kick good	31	23
"TOP" = time of possession. For other American football terms, see Glossary of American football.							31	23

=== Statistics ===
Statistics	UGA	TCU
First downs	17	17
Plays-yards	65–412	67–321
Third down efficiency	7–14	6–14
Rushes-yards	44–248	39–175
Passing yards	164	146
Passing, Comp-Att-Int	12–21–0	18–28–0
Time of Possession	33:24	26:36

Team	Category	Player	Statistics
UGA	Passing	Jacob Eason	12/21, 164 yds, 2 TD
UGA	Rushing	Nick Chubb	17 car, 142 yds, 1 TD
UGA	Receiving	Isaiah McKenzie	4 rec, 103 yds
TCU	Passing	Kenny Hill	18/27, 146 yds, 2 TD
TCU	Rushing	Kyle Hicks	15 car, 88 yds
TCU	Receiving	Kyle Hicks	5 rec, 21 yds
