= Lucas Niang =

French American football player (born 1998)

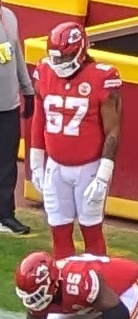
- Niang with the Kansas City Chiefs in 2022

Profile
- Position: Offensive tackle

Personal information
- Born: August 19, 1998 (age 28); New York, New York, U.S.
- Listed height: 6 ft 6 in (1.98 m)
- Listed weight: 315 lb (143 kg)

Career information
- High school: New Canaan (New Canaan, Connecticut)
- College: TCU (2016–2019)
- NFL draft: 2020: 3rd round, 96th overall pick

Career history
- Kansas City Chiefs (2020–2024); Washington Commanders (2025)

Awards and highlights
- 2× Super Bowl champion (LVII, LVIII); Second-team All-Big 12 (2018)

Career NFL statistics as of 2025
- Games played: 33
- Games started: 9
- Stats at Pro Football Reference

Lucas Balthazar Niang (born August 19, 1998) is a French American professional football offensive tackle. He played college football at TCU and was selected by the Kansas City Chiefs in the third round of the 2020 NFL draft. Niang has also played for the Washington Commanders.

== Early life ==
Niang grew up in New Canaan, Connecticut, where he became a football star at New Canaan High School. He was born in New York City and lived in Geneva, Switzerland from the ages of 4 to 6. His family moved to New Canaan, Connecticut when they returned to the US. Niang started to play football with the Pop Warner league in New Canaan in 3rd grade. Niang also played basketball and tennis growing up. Playing both offensive and defensive line in high school, he helped lead the Rams to state championships in 3 straight seasons from 2013 to 2015, before committing to play college football at TCU. At New Canaan, Niang was a two time All-FCIAC selection as a Junior and Senior, and during his Senior Season was an All-State First-team Selection, from both the Coaches Association and New Haven Register.

== College career ==
Niang was highly recruited coming out of high school. He had around 40 scholarship offers from schools including TCU, Penn State, Auburn, Miami, and Georgia, and decided to enroll at TCU. After enrolling at TCU in 2016, Niang played in 12 of the Horned Frogs' 13 games as a true freshman that fall. He became a starter midway through his sophomore season in 2017, helping lead the Frogs to the program's first-ever berth in the Big 12 Championship Game and a win in the 2017 Alamo Bowl over Stanford.

Starting all 13 games at right tackle for TCU as a junior in 2018, Niang didn't allow a sack the entire season and earned 2nd Team All-Big 12 honors before helpling lead the Frogs to a win over California in the 2018 Cheez-It Bowl.

Prior to his senior season, Niang was named 1st Team Preseason All-Big 12, and The Athletic named him as one of the top offensive linemen in college football. Hall of Fame NFL executive Gil Brandt has named Niang as one of the top offensive line prospects for the 2020 NFL draft, and ESPN draft expert Todd McShay has projected Niang as a first-round selection and best offensive tackle in the 2020 NFL draft.

Niang was forced to end his senior season early after TCU pulled out an upset win against the University of Texas in late October 2019. He had been advised by his doctor the week before to get surgery to repair a torn hip labrum he had been playing through since the beginning of the season to avoid the risk of a more severe injury.

Niang played as a true freshman in 12 games out of 13. He became a starter as a sophomore and in his 28 games and three-year span as a starter for TCU, he never allowed a single sack. Over that period, he only had two holding calls and no false starts.

== Professional career ==
Pre-draft measurables
Height	Weight	Arm length	Hand span	Wingspan
6 ft 6 in (1.98 m)	315 lb (143 kg)	34 1/4 in (0.87 m)	10 1/2 in (0.27 m)	6 ft 11 1/8 in (2.11 m)
All values from NFL Combine

=== Kansas City Chiefs ===
Niang was selected by the Kansas City Chiefs in the third round with the 96th overall pick of the 2020 NFL draft. On August 6, 2020, he announced he would opt out of the 2020 season due to the COVID-19 pandemic.

Niang was named the Chiefs starting right tackle to begin the 2021 season. He started seven of the first nine games, missing two with a shoulder injury, before suffering a ribs injury in Week 9. He missed the next four games. He made his first start at left tackle in Week 17 but suffered a torn patellar tendon in the game. He was placed on injured reserve on January 7, 2022.

On August 23, 2022, Niang was placed on the reserve/PUP list. He was activated from the reserve/PUP list three months later. Niang won his first Super Bowl when the Chiefs won Super Bowl LVII against the Philadelphia Eagles.

Niang is the first French national to ever play in the Super Bowl game and win a Super Bowl ring.

Niang won a second straight Super Bowl championship when the Chiefs defeated the San Francisco 49ers 25–22 in Super Bowl LVIII.

Niang was waived by the Chiefs on August 27, 2024, and re-signed to the practice squad. He was released on November 26.

=== Washington Commanders ===
On July 30, 2025, Niang signed with the Washington Commanders. He suffered a torn ACL in the first preseason game and was placed on injured reserve on August 11.

== Personal life ==
Niang's parents moved to the United States from France and he is fluent in French. His father is from France and his mother is from Côte d'Ivoire.
