= Corey Robinson (wide receiver) =

American football player and television personality (born 1995)

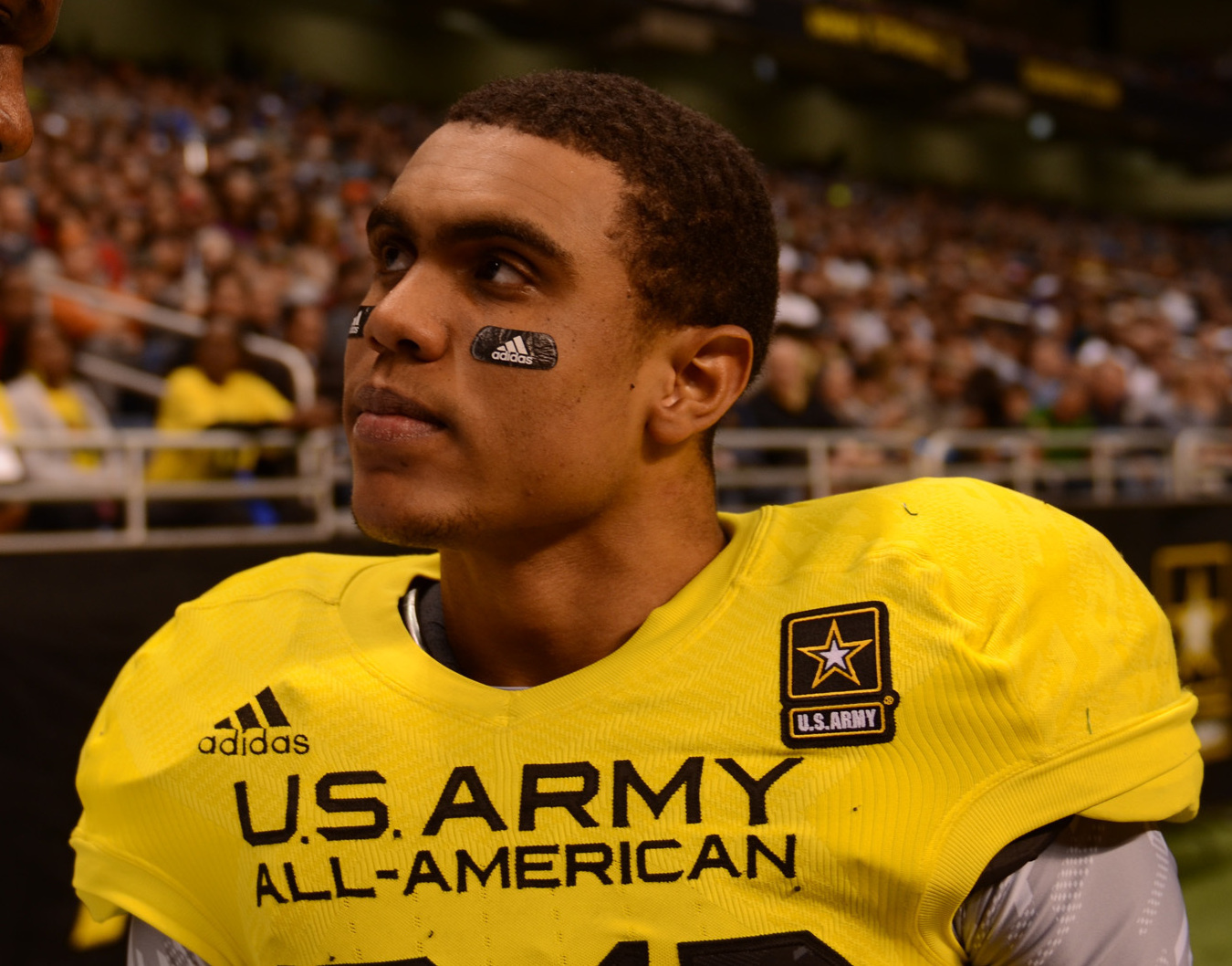
- Robinson in 2013

No. 88
- Position: Wide receiver

Personal information
- Born: January 1995 (age 31); San Antonio, Texas, U.S.
- Listed height: 6 ft 4.5 in (1.94 m)
- Listed weight: 215 lb (98 kg)

Career information
- High school: San Antonio (TX) Christian
- College: Notre Dame (2013–2015)

Awards and highlights
- First-team Academic All-American (2014)
- Stats at ESPN

Corey Robinson (born January 1995) is an American television personality and former football wide receiver for the Notre Dame Fighting Irish. He is now the host of World Chase Tag USA and a sideline reporter at the 2020 Olympics. He is the son of basketball superstar David Robinson.

== High school ==
Robinson attended San Antonio Christian Schools in San Antonio, Texas. As a senior, he had 67 receptions for 1,414 yards and 20 touchdowns. After the season, he was awarded the Glenn Davis Army Award, and was selected to play in the U.S. Army All-American Bowl in his hometown of San Antonio, Texas.

He was ranked by Scout.com as a four-star recruit, and the 43rd best wide receiver prospect of his class. Robinson committed to play college football at the University of Notre Dame in March 2012.

College recruiting
Name	Hometown	School	Height	Weight	Commit date
Corey Robinson; WR	San Antonio, TX	San Antonio Christian HS	6 ft 4 in (1.93 m)	197 lb (89 kg)	Mar 27, 2012
Corey Robinson; WR	Recruit ratings: Scout: Rivals: (77)				
Overall recruit ranking: Scout: 43 (WR), 14 (TX), 14 (regional)
Note: In many cases, Scout, Rivals, 247Sports, On3, and ESPN may conflict in their listings of height and weight.; In these cases, the average was taken. ESPN grades are on a 100-point scale.; Sources: "Notre Dame Football Commitment List". Rivals.; "Notre Dame College Football Recruiting Commits". Scout.; "ESPN". ESPN.; "Scout.com Team Recruiting Rankings". Scout.; "2013 Team Ranking". Rivals.com.

== College career ==
As a true freshman in 2013, Robinson played in all 13 games with three starts. He finished the year with nine receptions for 157 yards and one touchdown, a 35-yard reception against Air Force. Robinson entered his sophomore season in 2014 as a starter. He caught two touchdown passes in a 31–28 defeat against Florida State, and had the potential winning touchdown called off with 13 seconds remaining due to an offensive pass interference penalty on a teammate. Following the regular season, he was named a First-team Academic All-American. However, in the 2016 offseason, Robinson decided to leave football after suffering a third concussion in his junior year.

== Personal ==
His father is former NBA Hall of Famer David Robinson. His younger brother, Justin, began playing basketball for Duke in November 2015, and now plays professionally.

In 2021 Robinson became a broadcaster, serving as a studio analyst for NBC's Notre Dame football coverage.
