= Glenn Davis Army Award =

American football award

The Glenn Davis Army Award is given annually to the player of the West team at the U.S. Army All-American Bowl, who best epitomizes the US Army's high standards of excellence in community service, education, and athletic excellence. The award is named after Glenn Woodward Davis, the 1946 Heisman Trophy winner.

== Past winners ==
| Season | Player | Position | High school | College |
|---|---|---|---|---|
| 2003 | Kyle Caldwell | DE | Saguaro High School | Arizona State |
| 2004 | Jeff Byers | OL | Loveland High School | USC |
| 2005 | Mark Sanchez | QB | Mission Viejo High School | USC |
| 2006 | Chad Roark | OL | Ada High School | Oklahoma |
| 2007 | Ryan Mallett | QB | Texas High School | Michigan |
| 2008 | Dayne Crist | QB | Notre Dame High School | Notre Dame |
| 2009 | Allan Bridgford | QB | Mission Viejo High School | California |
| 2010 | C. J. Mosley | LB | Theodore High School | Alabama |
| 2011 | Ben Pruitt | K | The Woodlands High School | Texas |
| 2012 | Kyle Murphy | OL | San Clemente High School | Stanford |
| 2013 | Corey Robinson | WR | San Antonio Christian Schools | Notre Dame |
| 2014 | Kyle Allen | QB | Desert Mountain High School | Texas A&M |
| 2015 | Ben Humphreys | LB | Mater Dei High School | Duke |
| 2016 | Sewo Olonilua | RB | Kingwood High School | TCU |
| 2017 | Wyatt Davis | OL | St. John Bosco High School | Ohio State |
| 2018 | Cameron McGrone | LB | Lawrence Central High School | Michigan |
