= Derryck Thornton =

American basketball player (born 1997)

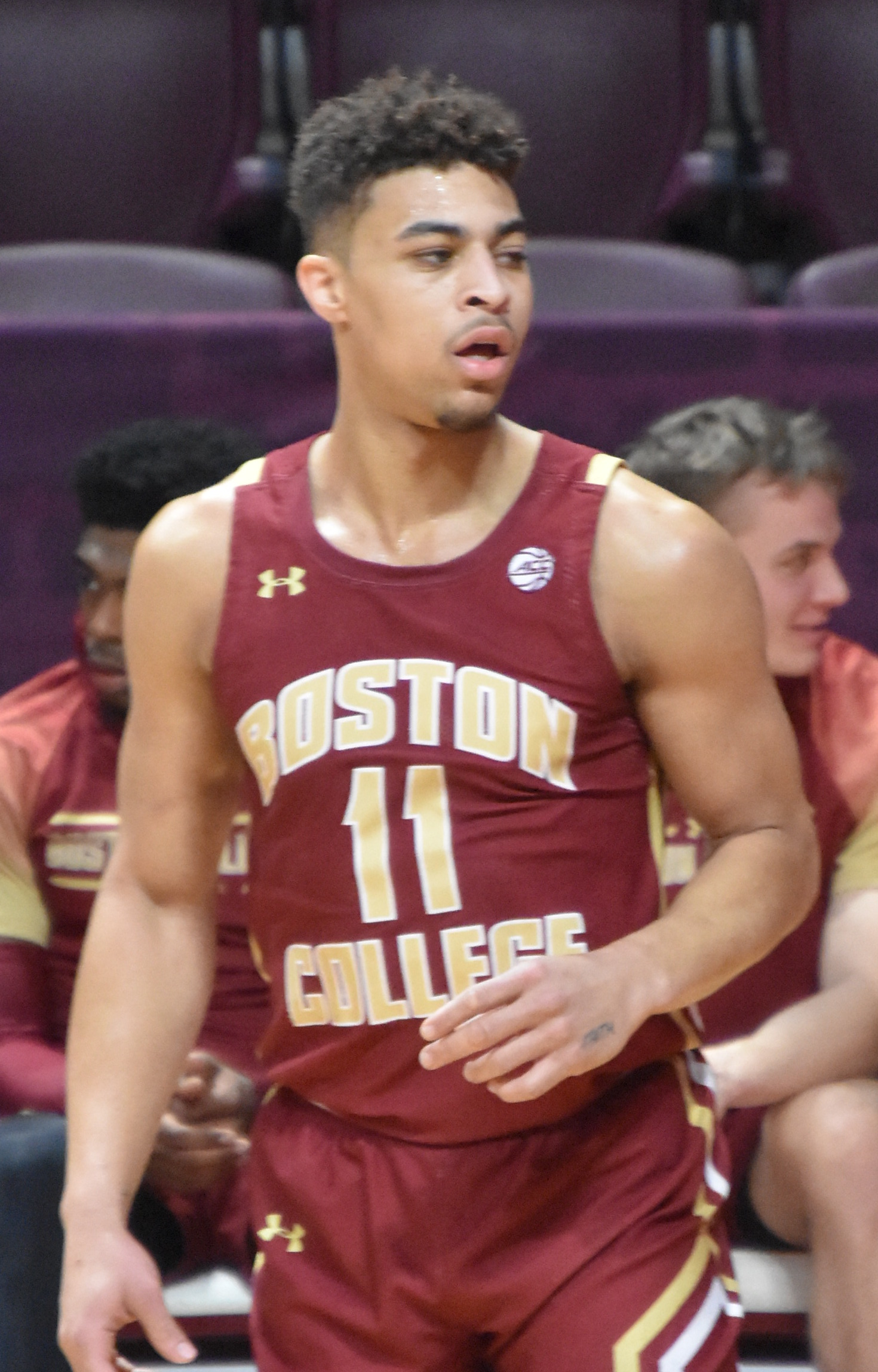
- Thornton with Boston College in 2020

Leicester Riders
- Position: Point guard
- League: British Basketball League

Personal information
- Born: May 30, 1997 (age 29) Woodland Hills, California, U.S.
- Listed height: 6 ft 3 in (1.91 m)
- Listed weight: 195 lb (88 kg)

Career information
- High school: Sierra Canyon (Chatsworth, California); Findlay Prep (Henderson, Nevada)
- College: Duke (2015–2016); USC (2017–2019); Boston College (2019–2020)
- NBA draft: 2020: undrafted
- Playing career: 2020–present

Career history
- 2020–2021: Borac Čačak
- 2021-2022: Kapfenberg Bulls
- 2022-present: Leicester Riders

Derryck Andre Thornton Jr. (born May 30, 1997) is an American professional basketball player for the Leicester Riders of the British Basketball league. He played college basketball for the Duke Blue Devils, the USC Trojans, and the Boston College Eagles.

== High school career ==
After attending Sierra Canyon School in Chatsworth, Los Angeles as a freshman, Thornton transferred to Findlay Prep in Henderson, Nevada. As a junior, he averaged 17 points and 6.2 assists per game, leading his team to a 29–3 record. He graduated one year early by taking courses online and at a local junior college.

=== Recruiting ===
On April 21, 2015, Thornton committed to play college basketball for Duke over offers from Arizona, Kentucky and Louisville. Coach Mike Krzyzewski convinced him to reclassify to the 2015 class to replace point guard Tyus Jones, who was leaving to play professionally. Thornton was a consensus five-star recruit and one of the highest ranked point guards in his class.

== College career ==
As a freshman at Duke, Thornton made 20 starts but saw his playing time fluctuate despite being the only pure point guard on the team. He averaged 7.1 points and 2.5 assists per game. Following the season Thornton transferred to USC, choosing the Trojans over Kansas, Washington and Miami. After sitting out a season as a redshirt, he averaged 3.8 points and 1.2 assists per game off the bench. As a redshirt junior, Thornton started 27 games and averaged 7.7 points and 4.3 assists per game. He opted to transfer after the season as a graduate transfer and committed to Boston College after considering Gonzaga, Texas Tech, Auburn and St. John's. Thornton averaged 12.7 points, 2.8 rebounds, 3.4 assists and 1.1 steals per game in his final season at Boston College.

== Professional career ==
On August 27, 2020, Thornton signed his first professional contract with Borac Čačak of the Basketball League of Serbia. He averaged 4.9 points and 1.5 assists per game. On December 17, 2021, Thornton signed with the Kapfenberg Bulls of the Austrian Basketball Superliga.

== Career statistics ==
Legend
GP	Games played	GS	Games started	MPG	Minutes per game
FG%	Field goal percentage	3P%	3-point field goal percentage	FT%	Free throw percentage
RPG	Rebounds per game	APG	Assists per game	SPG	Steals per game
BPG	Blocks per game	PPG	Points per game	**Bold**	Career high

=== College ===
Year	Team	GP	GS	MPG	FG%	3P%	FT%	RPG	APG	SPG	BPG	PPG
2015–16	Duke	**36**	20	26.0	**.390**	**.325**	.690	1.8	2.5	.8	**.2**	7.1
2016–17	USC	Redshirt										
2017–18	USC	25	1	14.2	.363	.318	**.852**	1.4	1.2	.7	**.2**	3.8
2018–19	USC	32	27	27.7	.382	.286	.660	**2.8**	**4.3**	**1.2**	.1	7.7
2019–20	Boston College	29	**29**	**31.4**	.376	.263	.786	**2.8**	3.4	1.1	**.2**	**12.7**
Career		122	77	25.3	.380	.290	.744	2.2	2.9	1.0	.2	7.9
