= 2015–16 Duke Blue Devils men's basketball team =

American college basketball season

2015–16 Duke Blue Devils men's basketball

2K Sports Classic champion

NCAA tournament, Sweet Sixteen
- Conference: Atlantic Coast Conference

Ranking
- Coaches: No. 18
- AP: No. 19
- Record: 25–11 (11–7 ACC)
- Head coach: Mike Krzyzewski (36th season)
- Assistant coach: Jeff Capel; Nate James; Jon Scheyer
- Captains: Amile Jefferson; Marshall Plumlee; Matt Jones
- Home arena: Cameron Indoor Stadium

2015–16 ACC men's basketball standings
	Conf.				Overall
Team	W		L	PCT	W		L	PCT
No. 3 North Carolina †	14	–	4	.778	33	–	7	.825
No. 4 Virginia	13	–	5	.722	29	–	8	.784
No. 10 Miami (FL)	13	–	5	.722	27	–	8	.771
No. 16 Louisville*	12	–	6	.667	23	–	8	.742
Notre Dame	11	–	7	.611	24	–	12	.667
No. 19 Duke	11	–	7	.611	25	–	11	.694
Virginia Tech	10	–	8	.556	20	–	15	.571
Clemson	10	–	8	.556	17	–	14	.548
Pittsburgh	9	–	9	.500	21	–	12	.636
Syracuse	9	–	9	.500	23	–	14	.622
Georgia Tech	8	–	10	.444	21	–	15	.583
Florida State	8	–	10	.444	20	–	14	.588
NC State	5	–	13	.278	16	–	17	.485
Wake Forest	2	–	16	.111	11	–	20	.355
Boston College	0	–	18	.000	7	–	25	.219
† 2016 ACC tournament winner * Ineligible for both the 2016 ACC tournament and the 2016 NCAA tournament due to self-imposed postseason ban. Rankings from AP poll

The 2015–16 Duke Blue Devils men's basketball team represented Duke University during the 2015–16 NCAA Division I men's basketball season. The Blue Devils were led by 36th-year head coach and Hall of Fame member Mike Krzyzewski. The team played their home games at Cameron Indoor Stadium in Durham, North Carolina as members of the Atlantic Coast Conference. They finished the season 25–11, 11–7 in ACC play to finish in a tie for fifth place. They defeated NC State in the second round of the ACC tournament to advance to the quarterfinals, where they lost to Notre Dame. They received an at-large bid to the NCAA tournament, where they defeated UNC Wilmington and Yale to advance to the Sweet Sixteen, where they lost to Oregon.

== Off season ==
=== Departures ===
Name	Number	Pos.	Height	Weight	Year	Hometown	Reason for departure
Quinn Cook	2	SG	6'2"	185	Senior	Bowie, Maryland	Graduated
Jahlil Okafor	15	C	6'11"	270	Freshman	Chicago, Illinois	Declared for 2015 NBA draft
Tyus Jones	5	PG	6'1"	190	Freshman	Apple Valley, Minnesota	Declared for 2015 NBA draft
Justise Winslow	12	SF	6'6"	225	Freshman	Houston, Texas	Declared for 2015 NBA draft

=== Class of 2015 signees ===
Duke recruits at the 2015 McDonald's All-American Boys Game

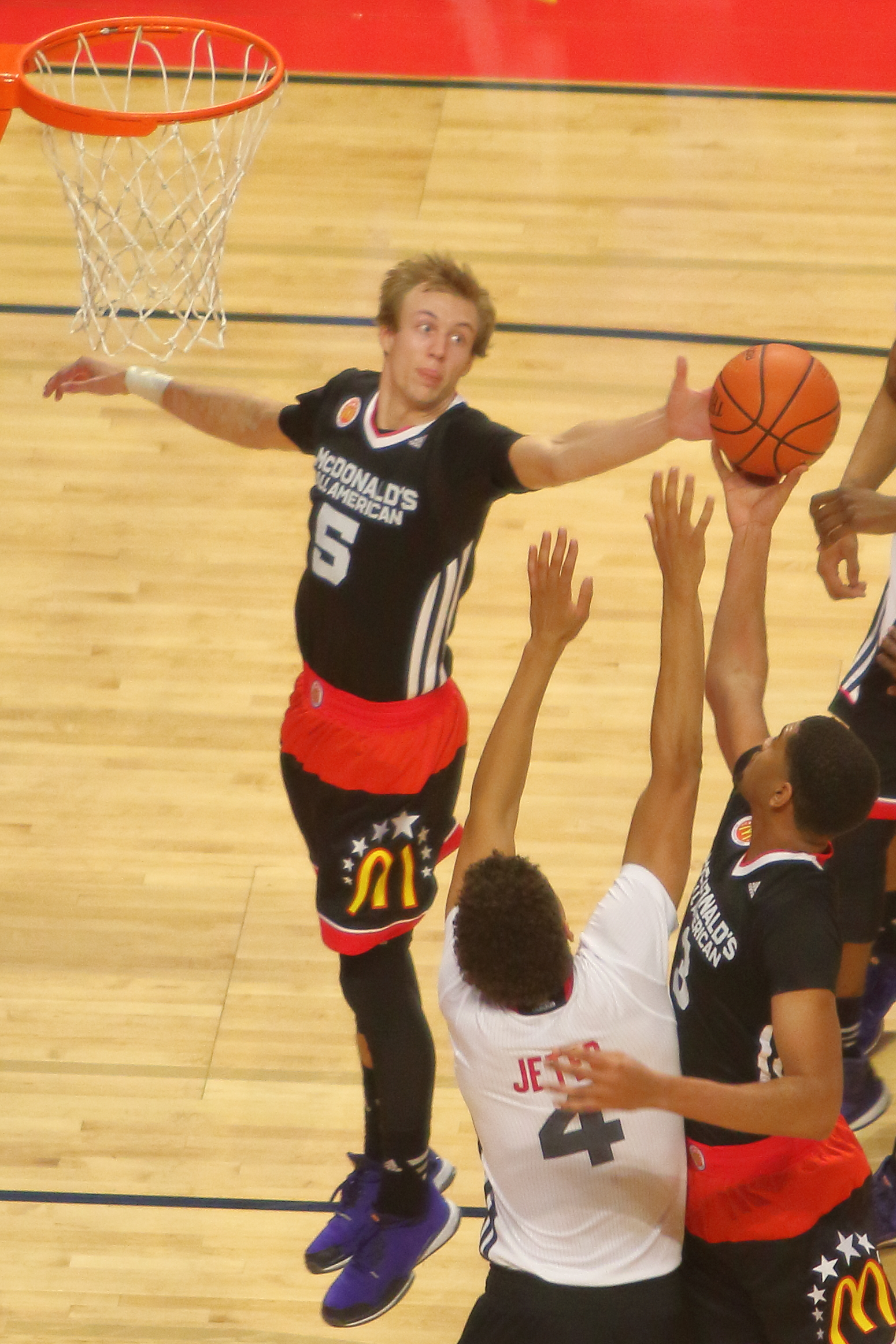
Luke Kennard

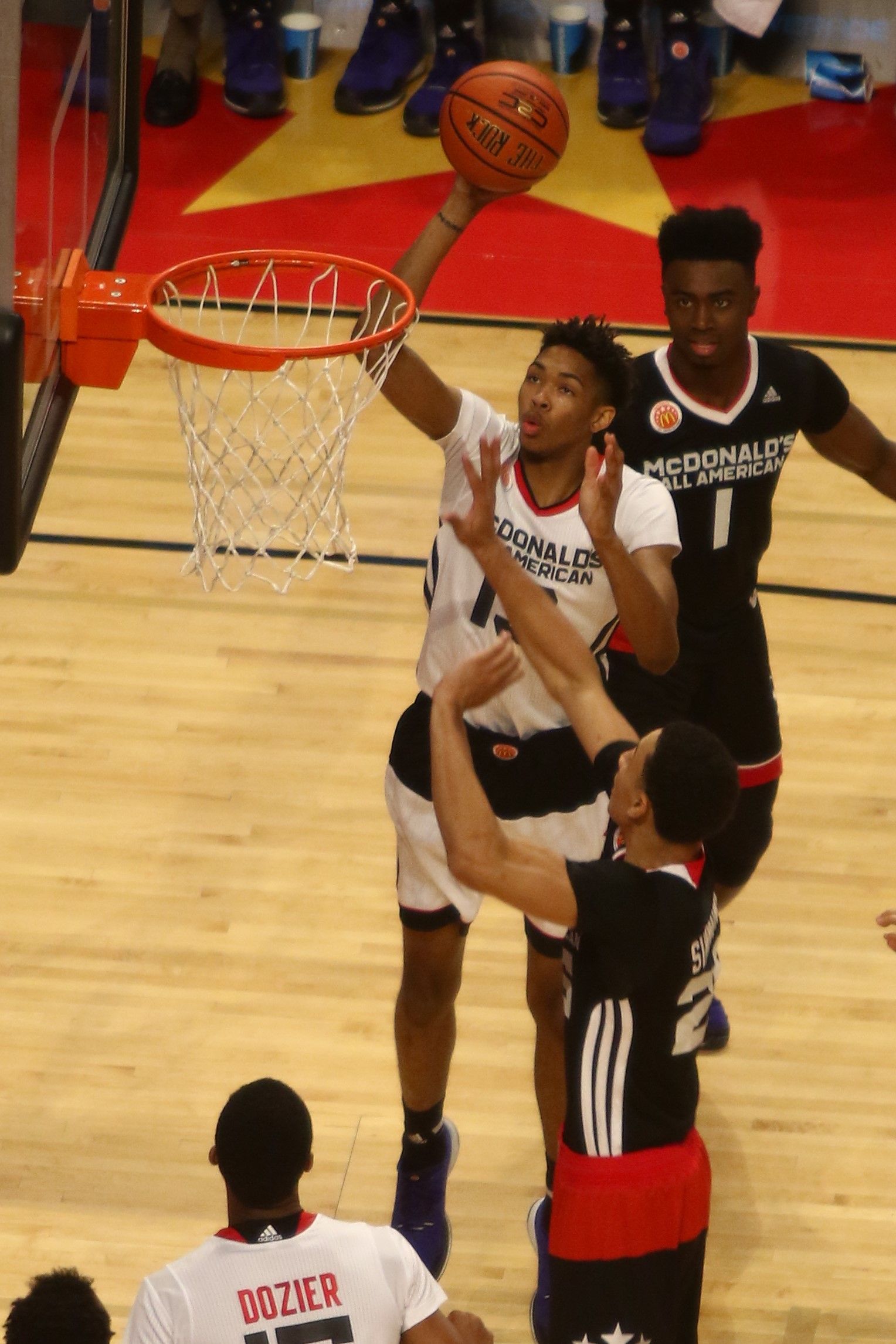
Brandon Ingram

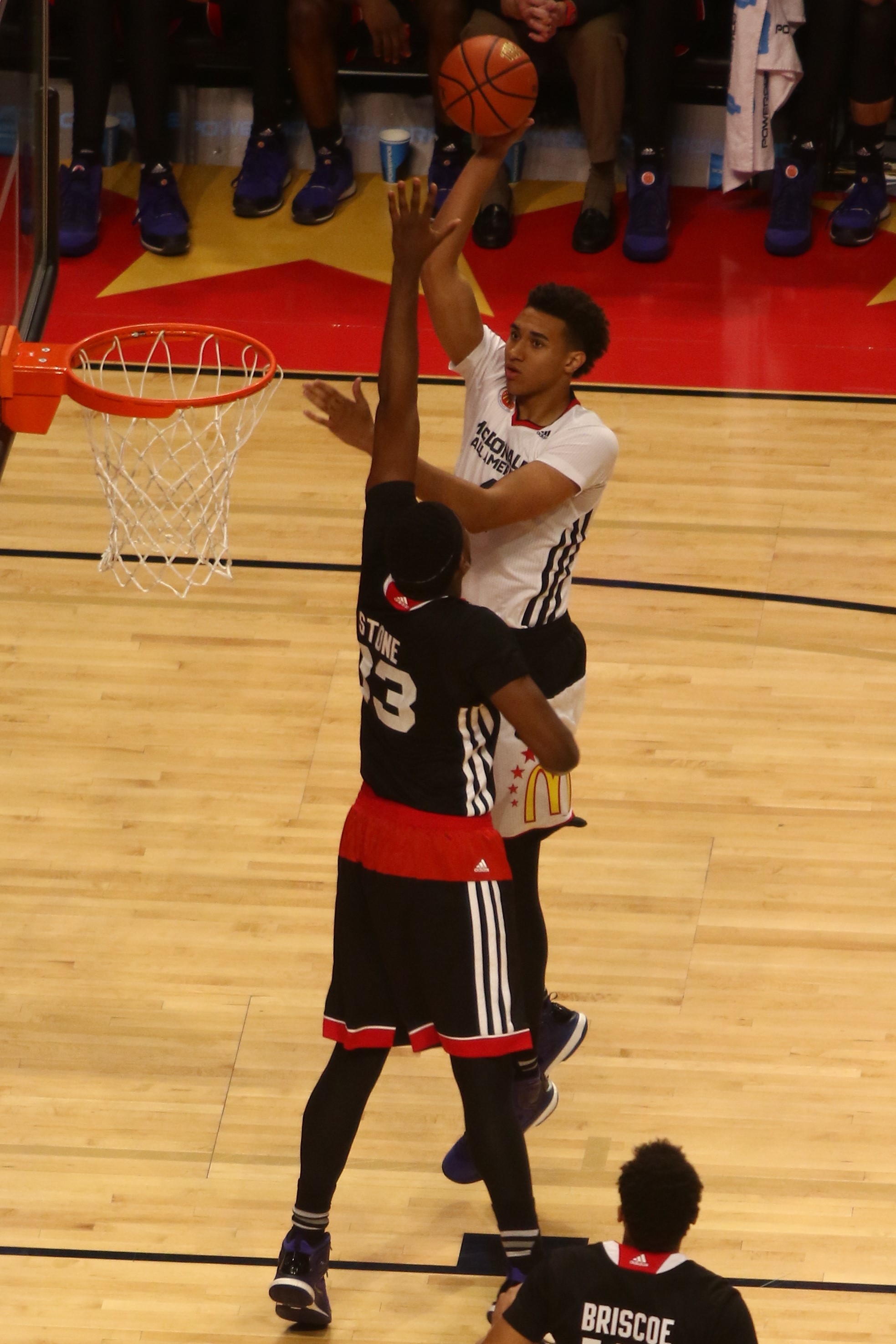
Chase Jeter

College recruiting
Name	Hometown	School	Height	Weight	Commit date
Luke Kennard; SG	Franklin, OH	Franklin HS	6 ft 5 in (1.96 m)	181 lb (82 kg)	Mar 24, 2014
Luke Kennard; SG	Recruit ratings: Scout: Rivals: 247Sports: ESPN:				
Chase Jeter; C	Las Vegas, NV	Bishop Gorman HS	6 ft 10 in (2.08 m)	225 lb (102 kg)	Aug 4, 2014
Chase Jeter; C	Recruit ratings: Scout: Rivals: 247Sports: ESPN:				
Justin Robinson; PF	San Antonio, TX	San Antonio Christian	6 ft 7 in (2.01 m)	185 lb (84 kg)	Dec 16, 2014
Justin Robinson; PF	Recruit ratings: Scout: Rivals: 247Sports: ESPN:				
Antonio Vrankovic; C	Fort Lauderdale, FL	Pine Crest School	6 ft 10 in (2.08 m)	261 lb (118 kg)	Apr 15, 2015
Antonio Vrankovic; C	Recruit ratings: Scout: Rivals: 247Sports: ESPN:				
Derryck Thornton; PG	Chatsworth, CA	Findlay Prep	6 ft 2 in (1.88 m)	174 lb (79 kg)	Apr 21, 2015
Derryck Thornton; PG	Recruit ratings: Scout: Rivals: 247Sports: ESPN:				
Brandon Ingram; SF	Kinston, NC	Kinston HS	6 ft 8 in (2.03 m)	191 lb (87 kg)	Apr 27, 2015
Brandon Ingram; SF	Recruit ratings: Scout: Rivals: 247Sports: ESPN:				
Overall recruit ranking: Scout: #1 Rivals: #1 ESPN: #1
Note: In many cases, Scout, Rivals, 247Sports, On3, and ESPN may conflict in their listings of height and weight.; In these cases, the average was taken. ESPN grades are on a 100-point scale.; Sources: "Duke Basketball Commitment List". Rivals.; "2015 Duke Basketball Commits". Scout.; "ESPN". ESPN.; "Scout.com Team Recruiting Rankings". Scout.; "2015 Team Ranking". Rivals.

== Roster ==
2015–16 Duke Blue Devils men's basketball team
Players
Coaches

Pos.	#	Name	Height	Weight	Year	Previous school	Hometown
F/C	2	Chase Jeter	6 ft 10 in (2.08 m)	240 lb (109 kg)	Fr	Bishop Gorman HS	Las Vegas, Nevada
G	3	Grayson Allen	6 ft 5 in (1.96 m)	205 lb (93 kg)	So	Providence School	Jacksonville, Florida
G	5	Luke Kennard	6 ft 5 in (1.96 m)	180 lb (82 kg)	Fr	Franklin HS	Franklin, Ohio
G	12	Derryck Thornton	6 ft 2 in (1.88 m)	175 lb (79 kg)	Fr	Findlay Prep	Chatsworth, California
G	13	Matt Jones (C)	6 ft 5 in (1.96 m)	200 lb (91 kg)	Jr	DeSoto HS	DeSoto, Texas
G/F	14	Brandon Ingram	6 ft 9 in (2.06 m)	190 lb (86 kg)	Fr	Kinston HS	Kinston, North Carolina
F	21	Amile Jefferson (injured) (C) (redshirt)	6 ft 9 in (2.06 m)	225 lb (102 kg)	Sr	Friends Central School	Philadelphia, Pennsylvania
C	30	Antonio Vrankovic	7 ft 0 in (2.13 m)	270 lb (122 kg)	Fr	Pine Crest School	Delray Beach, Florida
F	34	Sean Obi	6 ft 9 in (2.06 m)	265 lb (120 kg)	RS So	Greens Farms Academy	Kaduna, Nigeria
C	40	Marshall Plumlee (C)	7 ft 0 in (2.13 m)	250 lb (113 kg)	RS Sr	Christ School	Warsaw, Indiana
G	45	Nick Pagliuca (W)	6 ft 3 in (1.91 m)	195 lb (88 kg)	Jr	Milton Academy	Weston, Massachusetts
F	50	Justin Robinson (redshirt)	6 ft 8 in (2.03 m)	190 lb (86 kg)	Fr	San Antonio Christian	San Antonio, Texas
G	53	Brennan Besser (W)	6 ft 5 in (1.96 m)	180 lb (82 kg)	Fr	Latin School	Chicago, Illinois

Head coach

- Mike Krzyzewski

Assistant coach(es)

- Jeff Capel (Assoc. HC)
- Nate James
- Jon Scheyer

Legend

- (C) Team captain
- (S) Suspended
- (I) Ineligible
- (W) Walk-on
- Injured
- Current redshirt

Roster
Last update: 07/16/2015

=== Depth chart ===
Pos.	Starting 5	Bench 1	Bench 2
C	Marshall Plumlee	Chase Jeter	Antonio Vrankovic
PF	Amile Jefferson		Sean Obi
SF	Brandon Ingram	Matt Jones	Justin Robinson
SG	Luke Kennard		Brennan Besser
PG	Grayson Allen	Derryck Thornton	Nick Pagliuca

== Future recruits ==
=== 2016 recruiting class ===
Recruits at the 2016 McDonald's All-American Game

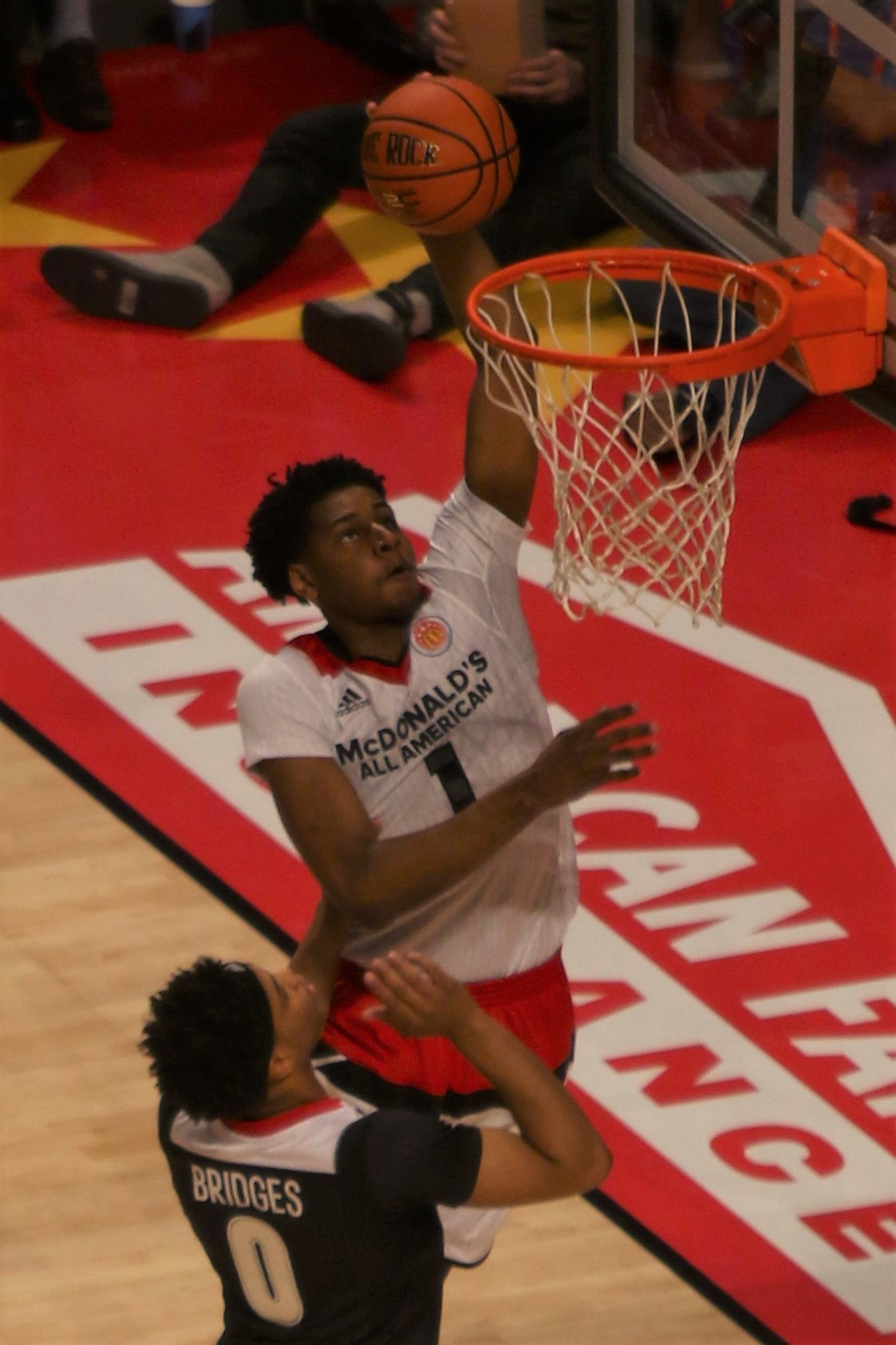
Marques Bolden, Duke

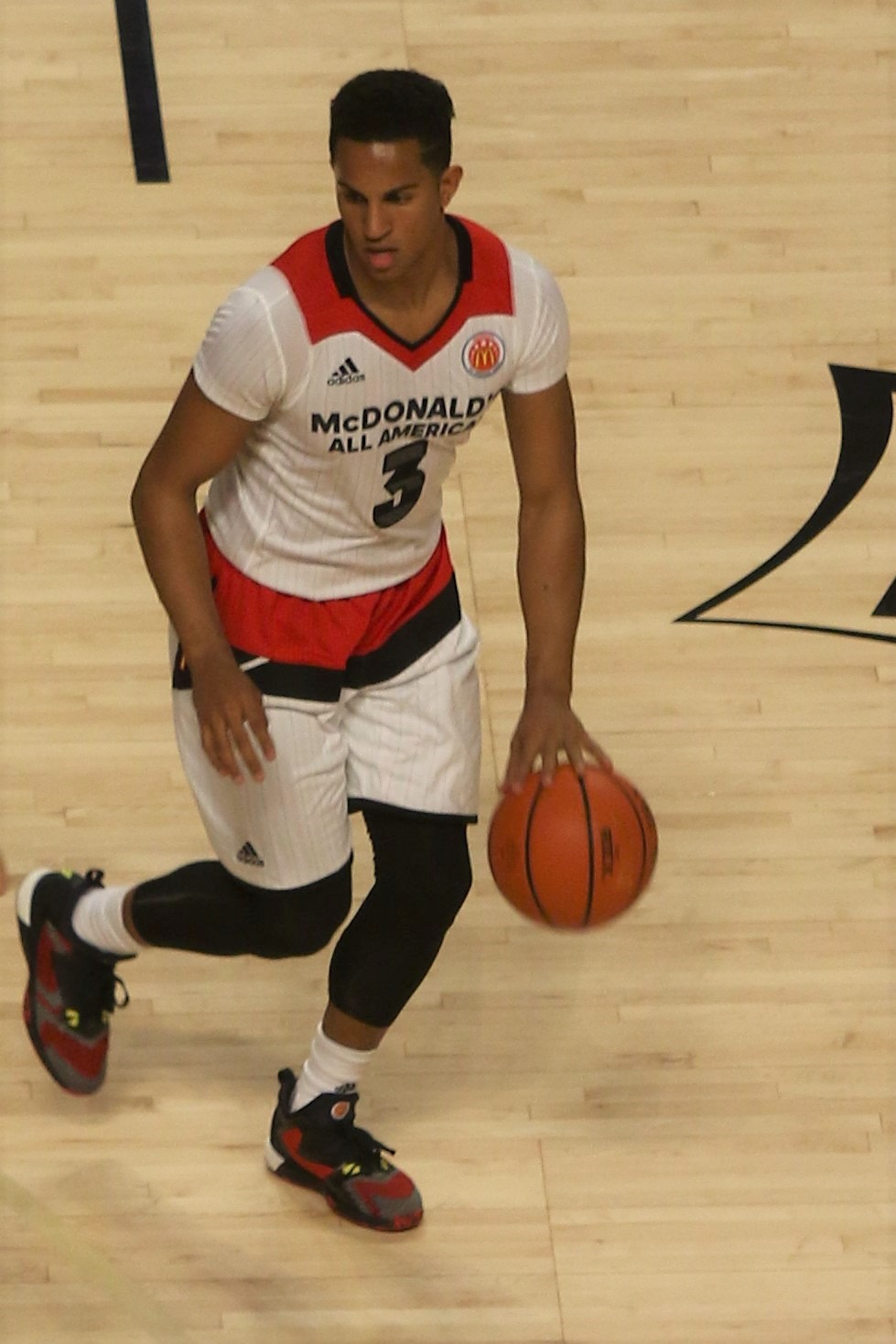
Frank Jackson, Duke

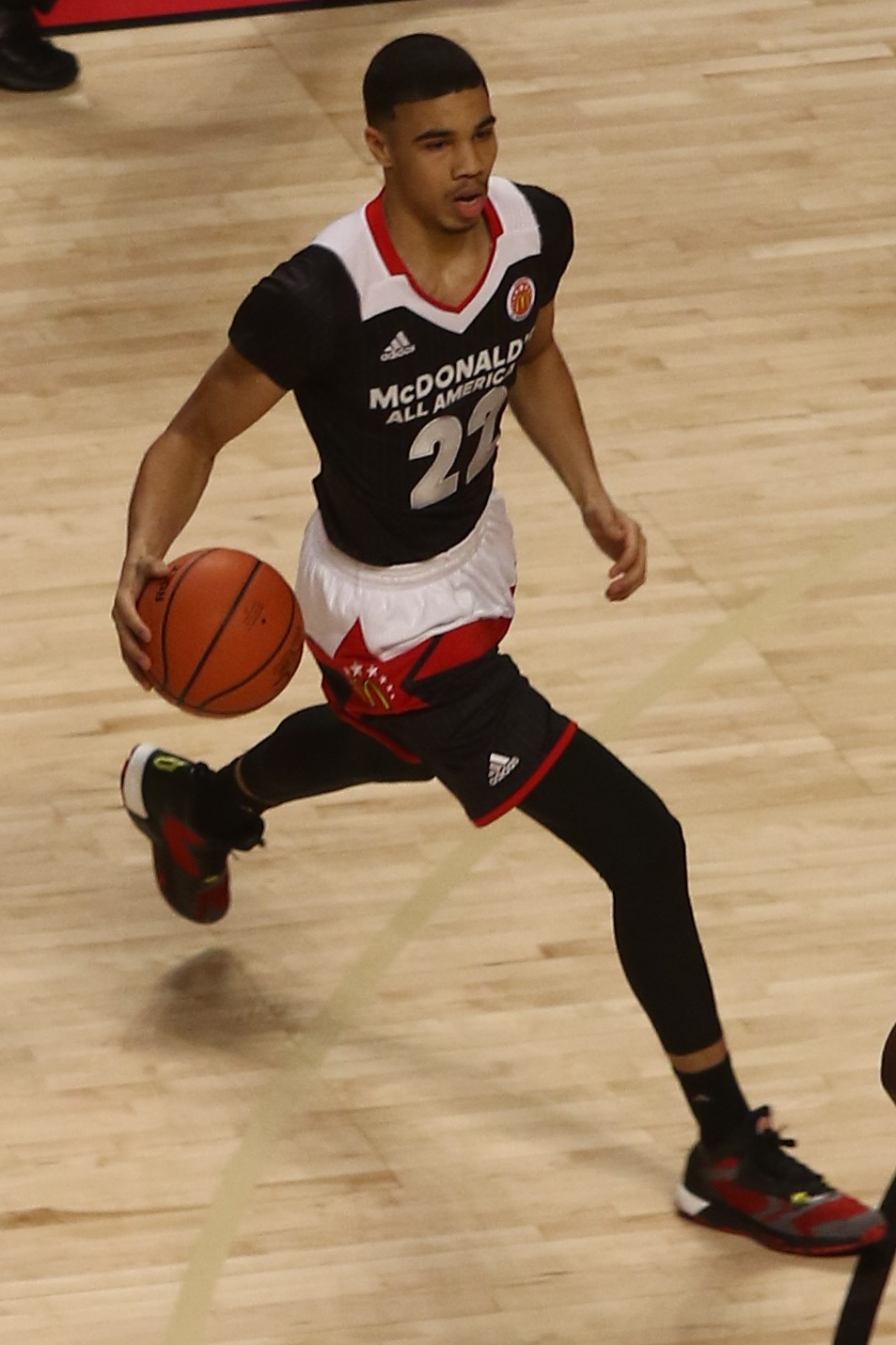
Jayson Tatum, Duke

College recruiting
Name	Hometown	School	Height	Weight	Commit date
Jayson Tatum; SF	St. Louis, MO	Chaminade College Prep	6 ft 8 in (2.03 m)	205 lb (93 kg)	Jul 12, 2015
Jayson Tatum; SF	Recruit ratings: Scout: Rivals: 247Sports: ESPN: (97)				
Frank Jackson; CG	Highland, UT	Lone Peak HS	6 ft 3 in (1.91 m)	185 lb (84 kg)	Sep 1, 2015
Frank Jackson; CG	Recruit ratings: Scout: Rivals: 247Sports: ESPN: (96)				
Javin DeLaurier; PF	Charlottesville, VA	St. Anne's-Belfield School	6 ft 8 in (2.03 m)	215 lb (98 kg)	Sep 27, 2015
Javin DeLaurier; PF	Recruit ratings: Scout: Rivals: 247Sports: ESPN: (87)				
Harry Giles III; PF	Winston-Salem, NC	Oak Hill Academy	6 ft 10 in (2.08 m)	220 lb (100 kg)	Nov 6, 2015
Harry Giles III; PF	Recruit ratings: Scout: Rivals: 247Sports: ESPN: (97)				
Jack White; SF	Canberra, AU	Australian Institute of Sport	6 ft 7 in (2.01 m)	220 lb (100 kg)	Mar 3, 2016
Jack White; SF	Recruit ratings: Scout: Rivals: 247Sports: ESPN:				
Marques Bolden; C	DeSoto, TX	DeSoto HS	6 ft 11 in (2.11 m)	240 lb (110 kg)	May 19, 2016
Marques Bolden; C	Recruit ratings: Scout: Rivals: 247Sports: ESPN: (93)				
Overall recruit ranking: Scout: #1 Rivals: #2 247Sports: #1 ESPN: #2
Note: In many cases, Scout, Rivals, 247Sports, On3, and ESPN may conflict in their listings of height and weight.; In these cases, the average was taken. ESPN grades are on a 100-point scale.; Sources:

== Schedule ==
Date time, TV	Rank^{#}	Opponent^{#}	Result	Record	High points	High rebounds	High assists	Site (attendance) city, state
Exhibition
Oct 30, 2015*; 7:00 pm	No. 5	Florida Southern	W 112–68	1–0	22 – Thornton	12 – Jefferson	6 – Jefferson	Cameron Indoor Stadium (9,314); Durham, NC
Nov 4, 2015*; 7:00 pm	No. 5	Livingstone	W 119–54	2–0	25 – Kennard	11 – Jeter	7 – Allen	Cameron Indoor Stadium (9,314); Durham, NC
Non-conference regular season
Nov 13, 2015*; 7:00 pm, ESPNU	No. 5	Siena; 2K Sports Classic Durham Regional	W 92–74	1–0	26 – Allen	12 – Jefferson	2 – Tied	Cameron Indoor Stadium (9,314); Durham, NC
Nov 14, 2015*; 8:00 pm, ESPN3	No. 5	Bryant; 2K Sports Classic Durham Regional	W 113–75	2–0	28 – Allen	11 – Jefferson	6 – Allen	Cameron Indoor Stadium (9,314); Durham, NC
Nov 17, 2015*; 7:30 pm, ESPN	No. 5	vs. No. 2 Kentucky; Champions Classic	L 63–74	2–1	16 – Tied	15 – Jefferson	3 – Thornton	United Center (21,461); Chicago, IL
Nov 20, 2015*; 7:00 pm, ESPN2	No. 5	vs. VCU; 2K Sports Classic Semifinal	W 79–71	3–1	30 – Allen	7 – Jefferson	4 – Thornton	Madison Square Garden (18,238); New York, NY
Nov 22, 2015*; 1:00 pm, ESPN	No. 5	vs. Georgetown; 2K Sports Classic Championship	W 86–84	4–1	32 – Allen	8 – Jefferson	4 – Allen	Madison Square Garden (17,287); New York, NY
Nov 25, 2015*; 7:00 pm, ESPNU	No. 6	Yale	W 80–61	5–1	17 – Jones	12 – Jefferson	5 – Allen	Cameron Indoor Stadium (9,314); Durham, NC
Nov 29, 2015*; 12:30 pm, ESPNU	No. 6	Utah State	W 85–52	6–1	22 – Tied	9 – Jefferson	2 – Tied	Cameron Indoor Stadium (9,314); Durham, NC
Dec 2, 2015*; 9:15 pm, ESPN	No. 7	Indiana; ACC-Big Ten Challenge	W 94–74	7–1	24 – Ingram	11 – Jefferson	8 – Jefferson	Cameron Indoor Stadium (9,314); Durham, NC
Dec 5, 2015*; 5:15 pm, ESPN2	No. 7	Buffalo	W 82–59	8–1	23 – Ingram	11 – Allen	5 – Thornton	Cameron Indoor Stadium (9,314); Durham, NC
Dec 15, 2015*; 7:00 pm, ESPN2	No. 7	Georgia Southern	W 99–65	9–1	26 – Ingram	14 – Ingram	5 – Allen	Cameron Indoor Stadium (9,314); Durham, NC
Dec 19, 2015*; 12:00 pm, ESPN	No. 7	vs. Utah; Madison Square Garden Showcase	L 75–77 ^{OT}	9–2	24 – Kennard	8 – Kennard	4 – Thornton	Madison Square Garden (13,174); New York, NY
Dec 28, 2015*; 8:00 pm, ESPNU	No. 15	Elon	W 105–66	10–2	26 – Ingram	11 – Tied	5 – Allen	Cameron Indoor Stadium (9,314); Durham, NC
Dec 30, 2015*; 4:00 pm, RSN	No. 15	Long Beach State	W 103–81	11–2	33 – Allen	6 – Allen	2 – Allen	Cameron Indoor Stadium (9,314); Durham, NC
ACC regular season
Jan 2, 2016; 4:30 pm, RSN	No. 15	at Boston College	W 81–64	12–2 (1–0)	25 – Ingram	9 – Ingram	3 – Ingram	Conte Forum (7,963); Chestnut Hill, MA
Jan 6, 2016; 7:00 pm, ESPNU	No. 14	at Wake Forest	W 91–75	13–2 (2–0)	24 – Allen	7 – Plumlee	3 – Tied	LJVM Coliseum (13,466); Winston-Salem, NC
Jan 9, 2016; 12:00 pm, ACCN	No. 14	Virginia Tech	W 82–58	14–2 (3–0)	21 – Plumlee	10 – Plumlee	7 – Thornton	Cameron Indoor Stadium (9,314); Durham, NC
Jan 13, 2016; 7:00 pm, ESPN2	No. 9	at Clemson	L 63–68	14–3 (3–1)	17 – Allen	9 – Plumlee	4 – Allen	Bon Secours Wellness Arena (12,972); Greenville, SC
Jan 16, 2016; 2:00 pm, ESPN2	No. 9	Notre Dame	L 91–95	14–4 (3–2)	30 – Kennard	9 – Plumlee	6 – Allen	Cameron Indoor Stadium (9,314); Durham, NC
Jan 18, 2016; 7:00 pm, ESPN	No. 20	Syracuse	L 62–64	14–5 (3–3)	19 – Plumlee	17 – Plumlee	6 – Jones	Cameron Indoor Stadium (9,314); Durham, NC
Jan 23, 2016; 12:00 pm, CBS	No. 20	at NC State	W 88–78	15–5 (4–3)	28 – Allen	8 – Plumlee	7 – Allen	PNC Arena (19,500); Raleigh, NC
Jan 25, 2016; 7:00 pm, ESPN	No. 24	at No. 15 Miami (FL)	L 69–80	15–6 (4–4)	19 – Ingram	10 – Ingram	2 – Tied	BankUnited Center (7,972); Coral Gables, FL
Feb 2, 2016; 9:00 pm, ESPNU		at Georgia Tech	W 80–71	16–6 (5–4)	27 – Allen	12 – Plumlee	4 – Tied	Hank McCamish Pavilion (8,600); Atlanta, GA
Feb 6, 2016; 2:00 pm, ESPN		NC State	W 88–80	17–6 (6–4)	28 – Allen	12 – Plumlee	6 – Jones	Cameron Indoor Stadium (9,314); Durham, NC
Feb 8, 2016; 7:00 pm, ESPN		No. 13 Louisville	W 72–65	18–6 (7–4)	19 – Allen	10 – Ingram	4 – Ingram	Cameron Indoor Stadium (9,314); Durham, NC
Feb 13, 2016; 4:30 pm, ESPN		No. 7 Virginia	W 63–62	19–6 (8–4)	25 – Ingram	10 – Plumlee	7 – Allen	Cameron Indoor Stadium (9,314); Durham, NC
Feb 17, 2016; 9:00 pm, ESPN/ACCN	No. 20	at No. 5 North Carolina; Rivalry	W 74–73	20–6 (9–4)	23 – Allen	10 – Ingram	4 – Ingram	Dean Smith Center (21,750); Chapel Hill, NC
Feb 20, 2016; 12:00 pm, ESPN	No. 20	at No. 18 Louisville	L 64–71	20–7 (9–5)	29 – Allen	14 – Plumlee	3 – Tied	KFC Yum! Center (22,785); Louisville, KY
Feb 25, 2016; 7:00 pm, ESPN	No. 15	Florida State	W 80–65	21–7 (10–5)	18 – Allen	10 – Plumlee	5 – Tied	Cameron Indoor Stadium (9,314); Durham, NC
Feb 28, 2016; 2:00 pm, CBS	No. 15	at Pittsburgh	L 62–76	21–8 (10–6)	22 – Allen	4 – Plumlee	2 – Tied	Peterson Events Center (12,508); Pittsburgh, PA
Mar 1, 2016; 8:00 pm, ACCN	No. 17	Wake Forest	W 79–71	22–8 (11–6)	30 – Allen	17 – Plumlee	4 – Thornton	Cameron Indoor Stadium (9,314); Durham, NC
Mar 5, 2016; 6:30 pm, ESPN	No. 17	No. 8 North Carolina; Rivalry/ESPN College GameDay	L 72–76	22–9 (11–7)	29 – Allen	9 – Plumlee	5 – Allen	Cameron Indoor Stadium (9,314); Durham, NC
ACC Tournament
Mar 9, 2016; 2:30 pm, ESPN	(5) No. 19	vs. (12) NC State; Second Round	W 92–89	23–9	22 – Tied	10 – Plumlee	6 – Allen	Verizon Center (18,561); Washington, D.C.
Mar 10, 2016; 2:00 pm, ESPN	(5) No. 19	vs. (4) Notre Dame; Quarterfinals	L 79–84 ^{OT}	23–10	27 – Allen	7 – Ingram	4 – Thornton	Verizon Center (18,561); Washington, D.C
NCAA tournament
Mar 17, 2016*; 12:15 pm, CBS	(4 W) No. 19	vs. (13 W) UNC Wilmington; First Round	W 93–85	24–10	23 – Tied	10 – Allen	5 – Allen	Dunkin' Donuts Center (11,656); Providence, RI
Mar 19, 2016*; 2:40 pm, CBS	(4 W) No. 19	vs. (12 W) Yale; Second Round	W 71–64	25–10	29 – Allen	10 – Plumlee	5 – Thornton	Dunkin' Donuts Center (11,679); Providence, RI
Mar 24, 2016*; 6:55 pm, TBS	(4 W) No. 19	vs. (1 W) No. 5 Oregon; Sweet Sixteen	L 68–82	25–11	24 – Ingram	11 – Kennard	3 – Tied	Honda Center (17,601); Anaheim, CA
*Non-conference game. ^{#}Rankings from AP Poll. (#) Tournament seedings in parentheses. W=West Region. All times are in Eastern Time.

== Rankings ==
Ranking movements Legend: ██ Increase in ranking ██ Decrease in ranking RV = Received votes
	Week																			
Poll	Pre	2	3	4	5	6	7	8	9	10	11	12	13	14	15	16	17	18	Post	Final
AP	5	5	6	7	8	7	15	15	14	9	20	24	RV	RV	20	15	17	19	19	N/A*
Coaches	4	4	3	5	5	6	10	12	10	6	12	20	RV	RV	19	18	21	21	20	18

*AP does not release post-NCAA tournament rankings
