= Jaylinn Hawkins =

American football player (born 1997)

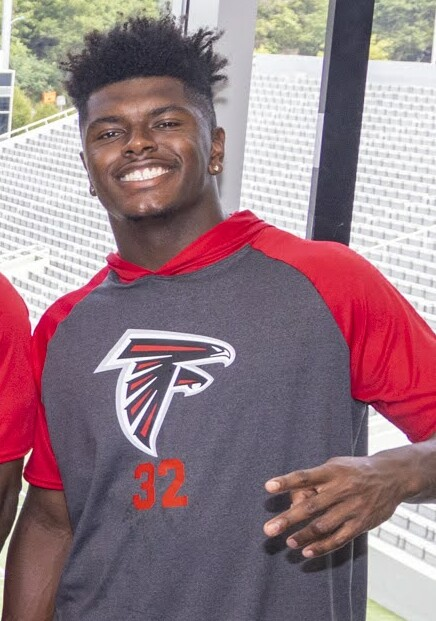
- Hawkins in 2022

No. 21 – Baltimore Ravens
- Position: Safety
- Roster status: Active

Personal information
- Born: August 25, 1997 (age 29); Buena Park, California, U.S.
- Listed height: 6 ft 1 in (1.85 m)
- Listed weight: 208 lb (94 kg)

Career information
- High school: Buena Park (Buena Park, California, U.S.)
- College: California (2015–2019)
- NFL draft: 2020: 4th round, 134th overall pick

Career history
- Atlanta Falcons (2020–2023); Los Angeles Chargers (2023); New England Patriots (2024–2025); Baltimore Ravens (2026–present)

Career NFL statistics as of 2025
- Total tackles: 254
- Sacks: 2
- Forced fumbles: 2
- Fumble recoveries: 3
- Pass deflections: 17
- Interceptions: 8
- Defensive touchdowns: 1
- Stats at Pro Football Reference

Jaylinn Hawkins (born August 25, 1997) is an American professional football safety for the Baltimore Ravens of the National Football League (NFL). He played college football for the California Golden Bears and was selected by the Atlanta Falcons in the fourth round of the 2020 NFL draft.

== Early and personal life ==
Hawkins was born in Buena Park, California. He attended Orange Lutheran High School, as a freshman before transferring to Buena Park High School, where he was a four star recruit, and graduated in 2015. He committed to play college football at the University of California, Berkeley over offers from Utah, Washington, and Oregon.

== College career ==
Hawkins redshirted his first year with the California Golden Bears in 2015. In the 2016 season, Hawkins played snaps in all 12 games and started three games at safety. He was also recognized as a scholar-athlete of the week. His cousin, Jeremiah Hawkins, joined the Bears as a freshman wide receiver this season.

In 2017, Hawkins started 11 of the team's 12 games and played snaps in all 12.

In 2018, Hawkins started 12 of the team's 13 games and played snaps in all 13. He led the Pac-12 with 6 interceptions. When targeted, he held the lowest passer rating (1.7) amongst Pac-12 safeties. At the 2018 Cheez-It Bowl, Hawkins had three interceptions, the most in any bowl game that year. Hawkins was named Defensive MVP of the game despite Cal's loss to TCU.

Prior to the 2019 season, Hawkins was named a preseason 2nd team All-Pac-12 player. He started and played in all 13 games. During a game against Stanford, Hawkins made a one-handed interception that made the SportsCenter Top 10.

In his overall college career, Jaylinn Hawkins recorded 156 tackles, 9.5 tackles for a loss, 10 interceptions and three forced fumbles and returned nine kicks for 129 yards. He graduated from Berkeley with a degree in American studies.

== Professional career ==
Pre-draft measurables
Height	Weight	Arm length	Hand span	Wingspan	Vertical jump	Broad jump
6 ft 0 5/8 in (1.84 m)	208 lb (94 kg)	31 3/4 in (0.81 m)	9 1/2 in (0.24 m)	6 ft 5 1/8 in (1.96 m)	35.5 in (0.90 m)	9 ft 9 in (2.97 m)
All values from NFL Combine

=== Atlanta Falcons ===
Hawkins was selected in the fourth round of the 2020 NFL draft with the 134th overall pick by the Atlanta Falcons. His collegiate partner at safety, Ashtyn Davis, was taken in the third round of the 2020 NFL draft with the 68th overall pick by the New York Jets. Hawkins was placed on the reserve/COVID-19 list by the Falcons on July 28, 2020, and was activated eight days later.

Hawkins scored his first professional touchdown in Week 6 of the 2022 season against the San Francisco 49ers when he recovered a fumble in the end zone. He also recorded an interception in the same game.

The Falcons waived Hawkins on October 17, 2023.

=== Los Angeles Chargers ===
On October 18, 2023, the Los Angeles Chargers claimed Hawkins off waivers.

=== New England Patriots ===
On March 21, 2024, Hawkins signed with the New England Patriots. He played in all 17 games with seven starts, recording 48 tackles and one pass deflection. Hawkins again played all 17 games in the 2025 season, recording 71 tackles and 4 interceptions. On January 11, 2026, Hawkins made his playoff debut in a 16–3 win against the Los Angeles Chargers in the Wild Card round. Hawkins had five total tackles in Super Bowl LX, a 29–13 loss to the Seattle Seahawks.

=== Baltimore Ravens ===
On March 12, 2026, Hawkins signed with the Baltimore Ravens on a two-year, $10 million contract.

== NFL career statistics ==
Legend
**Bold**	Career high

=== Regular season ===
Year	Team	Games		Tackles					Interceptions						Fumbles				
Year	Team	GP	GS	Cmb	Solo	Ast	Sck	TFL	Int	Yds	Avg	Lng	TD	PD	FF	Fum	FR	Yds	TD
2020	ATL	12	2	13	8	5	0.5	0	0	0	0.0	0	0	0	0	0	0	0	0
2021	ATL	14	4	24	13	11	0.0	1	2	11	5.5	11	0	3	0	0	0	0	0
2022	ATL	16	16	**84**	**45**	**39**	0.0	0	2	**14**	**7.0**	**14**	0	**6**	**1**	0	**1**	0	**1**
2023	ATL	6	0	3	2	1	0.0	0	0	0	0.0	0	0	0	0	0	0	0	0
2023	LAC	10	3	11	4	7	0.0	0	0	0	0.0	0	0	1	0	0	0	0	0
2024	NE	17	7	48	27	21	0.0	**3**	0	0	0.0	0	0	1	0	0	**1**	0	0
2025	NE	15	15	71	**45**	26	**1.5**	**3**	**4**	1	0.3	1	0	**6**	**1**	0	**1**	0	0
2026	BAL	6	6	30	17	13	0.0	0	0	0	0.0	0	0	0	0	0	0	0	0
Career		96	54	296	175	110	2.0	7	8	26	3.3	14	0	17	2	0	3	0	1

=== Postseason ===
Year	Team	Games		Tackles					Interceptions						Fumbles				
Year	Team	GP	GS	Cmb	Solo	Ast	Sck	TFL	Int	Yds	Avg	Lng	TD	PD	FF	Fum	FR	Yds	TD
2025	NE	4	4	15	8	7	0.0	0	0	0	0.0	0	0	0	0	0	0	0	0
Career		4	4	15	8	7	0.0	0	0	0	0.0	0	0	0	0	0	0	0	0

== Personal life ==
Hawkins has Panamanian roots. On March 23, 2025, Hawkins got married.
