= Taj Williams =

American football player (born 1993)

Profile
- Position: Wide receiver

Personal information
- Born: April 2, 1993 (age 33); Tallahassee, Florida
- Listed height: 6 ft 4 in (1.93 m)
- Listed weight: 196 lb (89 kg)

Career information
- High school: Lincoln (Tallahassee, FL)
- College: TCU
- NFL draft: 2018: undrafted

Career history
- Seattle Seahawks (2018)*; Atlanta Falcons (2018)*
- * Offseason or practice squad member only

Taj Williams (born April 2, 1993) is an American football wide receiver who is currently a free agent. He played college football at TCU.

== Professional career ==
Williams signed with the Seattle Seahawks as an undrafted free agent on May 4, 2018, but was waived following their rookie minicamp on May 7.

Williams signed with the Atlanta Falcons as an undrafted free agent on June 4, 2018. He was waived on August 20, 2018.
