= Sewo Olonilua =

American football player (born 1997)

No. 45, 33
- Position: Running back

Personal information
- Born: November 27, 1997 (age 28); Kingwood, Texas, U.S.
- Listed height: 6 ft 3 in (1.91 m)
- Listed weight: 240 lb (109 kg)

Career information
- High school: Kingwood (TX)
- College: TCU
- NFL draft: 2020: undrafted

Career history
- Dallas Cowboys (2020–2021); Houston Roughnecks (2023); Orlando Guardians (2024)*; Edmonton Elks (2024)
- * Offseason or practice squad member only
- Stats at Pro Football Reference

Sewo Olonilua (born November 27, 1997) is an American former professional football running back. He played college football at TCU.

== Early life ==
Olonilua attended Kingwood High School. He played as a running back in his four seasons and also started two-ways as an outside linebacker beginning as a junior. As a senior, he registered 1,073 rushing yards (11.4-yard avg.) and 14 touchdowns. He played in the U.S. Army All-American Bowl and received the Glenn Davis Army Award.

He was a four-star recruit coming out of high school and committed to play football at Texas Christian University, turning down offers from LSU, Oklahoma and Texas A&M.

== College career ==
Olonilua accepted a football scholarship from Texas Christian University (TCU). As a true freshman, he appeared in all 13 games, with his only start coming in the Liberty Bowl. During the season he had 15 carries for 122 rushing yards and one touchdown.

As a sophomore, he appeared in all 14 games, making 64 carries for 330 yards, 7 touchdowns, 19 receptions for 166 yards and 5 special teams tackles.

As a junior, he appeared in all 13 games, leading the team with 135 carries for 635 yards (4.7-yard avg.). He was named the Cheez-It Bowl Offensive Most Valuable Player after rushing for a TCU bowl record 194 yards.

As a senior, he was third on the team with 537 yards (4.0-yard avg.) and had 8 rushing touchdowns (led the team). He tallied 18 carries for 106 yards and one touchdown against Purdue University.

== Professional career ==
Pre-draft measurables
Height	Weight	Arm length	Hand span	Wingspan	40-yard dash	10-yard split	20-yard split	20-yard shuttle	Vertical jump	Broad jump	Bench press
6 ft 2 5/8 in (1.90 m)	232 lb (105 kg)	32 1/8 in (0.82 m)	10 in (0.25 m)	6 ft 6 1/8 in (1.98 m)	4.66 s	1.57 s	2.73 s	4.28 s	36.0 in (0.91 m)	10 ft 3 in (3.12 m)	25 reps
All values from NFL Combine

=== Dallas Cowboys ===
Olonilua was signed as an undrafted free agent by the Dallas Cowboys after the 2020 NFL draft on April 27. He was waived on September 5, 2020, and signed to the practice squad the next day. He was elevated to the active roster on November 7 and December 19 for the team's weeks 9 and 15 games against the Pittsburgh Steelers and San Francisco 49ers, and reverted to the practice squad after each game. He was promoted to the active roster on December 26, 2020.

On August 17, 2021, Olonilua was placed on season-ending injured reserve with a neck injury. On May 4, 2022, he was released after the Cowboys signed fullback Ryan Nall.

=== Houston Roughnecks ===
The Houston Roughnecks selected Olonilua in the sixth round of the 2023 XFL Supplemental Draft on January 1, 2023. He was released on June 21, 2023.

=== Orlando Guardians ===
Olonilua signed with the Orlando Guardians on June 26, 2023. The Guardians folded when the XFL and USFL merged to create the United Football League (UFL).

=== Edmonton Elks ===
On January 29, 2024, Olonilua signed with the Edmonton Elks of the Canadian Football League (CFL). He became a free agent following the season.
