= Justin Robinson (basketball, born 1996) =

American basketball player (born 1996)

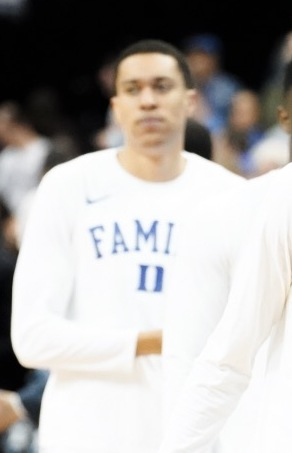
- Robinson with Duke in 2019

Los Angeles Lakers
- Title: Player development coach
- League: NBA

Personal information
- Born: October 14, 1996 (age 30) San Antonio, Texas
- Listed height: 6 ft 9 in (2.06 m)
- Listed weight: 202 lb (92 kg)

Career information
- High school: San Antonio Christian (San Antonio, Texas)
- College: Duke (2016–2020)
- NBA draft: 2020: undrafted
- Playing career: 2020–2023
- Position: Small forward / power forward

Career history
- 2020–2021: Mornar Bar
- 2020–2021: →Podgorica
- 2021: Maccabi Ra'anana
- 2021–2023: Elitzur Netanya

Justin Michael Robinson (born October 14, 1996) is an American former professional basketball player who is currently a player development coach for the Los Angeles Lakers of the National Basketball Association (NBA). He played college basketball for the Duke Blue Devils. He is the youngest son of Hall of Fame basketball player David Robinson.

== High school career ==
Robinson attended San Antonio Christian School in San Antonio, Texas. As a senior, he averaged 13.5 points, 10.2 rebounds and 4.6 blocks per game, leading his team to a 33–6 record. Robinson was named to the Texas Association of Private and Parochial Schools 4A All-District First Team.

== College career ==
Robinson expected to play for Duke as a walk-on before accepting a scholarship offer from the program. He redshirted his first season, during which he often guarded Brandon Ingram at practice. He was named a team captain as a senior.

Robinson was on Duke's 2017 ACC tournament championship team and 2019 ACC tournament championship team.

In the final game of the season, on March 7, 2020, he made his first career start and recorded 13 points, six rebounds, four blocks and three assists in an 89–76 win over North Carolina. It was the third straight game that Robinson had played significant minutes. Coach Mike Krzyzewski compared him to Notre Dame football walk-on Rudy Ruettiger, saying he was better. Robinson finished the season averaging 2.8 points and 1.5 rebounds in 6.8 minutes per game.

In his senior season, Robinson received the 2020 Tedd E. Mann award for his contributions to the team.

== Professional career ==
On September 18, 2020, Robinson signed his first professional contract with Mornar Bar of the Montenegrin League and the ABA League.

On October 6, 2020, Podgorica announced that they had signed Robinson.

Robinson had been included in roster of the San Antonio Spurs for 2021 NBA Summer League. Here, he played in three games and averaged 4.3 points, 4.0 rebounds and 2.7 assists.

On September 13, 2021, he signed with Mornar Bar of the Montenegrin League and the ABA League.

== Post-playing career ==
On November 28, 2023 he was named Duke's Director of Player Development by Coach Jon Scheyer.

On July 7, 2025, the Los Angeles Lakers hired Robinson as player development coach.

== Career statistics ==
Legend
GP	Games played	GS	Games started	MPG	Minutes per game
FG%	Field goal percentage	3P%	3-point field goal percentage	FT%	Free throw percentage
RPG	Rebounds per game	APG	Assists per game	SPG	Steals per game
BPG	Blocks per game	PPG	Points per game	**Bold**	Career high

=== College ===
Year	Team	GP	GS	MPG	FG%	3P%	FT%	RPG	APG	SPG	BPG	PPG
2015–16	Duke	Redshirt										
2016–17	Duke	6	0	1.7	–	–	**.500**	.2	.0	.0	.0	.2
2017–18	Duke	**17**	0	4.8	.421	.353	.250	.6	.1	.0	.5	1.4
2018–19	Duke	**17**	0	3.4	**.615**	**.444**	.000	.5	.1	.1	.2	1.2
2019–20	Duke	15	**1**	**6.8**	.516	.429	**.500**	**1.5**	**.5**	**.3**	**1.1**	**2.8**
Career		55	1	4.6	.508	.404	.333	.8	.2	.1	.5	1.6

== Personal life ==
His father, David Robinson, was inducted into the Naismith Memorial Basketball Hall of Fame following a 14-year career in the National Basketball Association with the San Antonio Spurs. Robinson's older brother, Corey, played college football for Notre Dame.

Robinson graduated from Duke University with a degree in Psychology and earned a Masters of Management Studies (MMS) degree from Duke's Fuqua School of Business in 2020. While at Duke, Robinson was a 3-time ACC Honor Roll recipient.
