= 2018 Cheez-It Bowl =

College football bowl game

- 30th Cheez-It Bowl
California Golden Bears	TCU Horned Frogs
(7–5)	(6–6)
Pac-12	Big 12
7	10
Head coach: Justin Wilcox	Head coach: Gary Patterson
	1	2	3	4	OT	Total
California	7	0	0	0	0	7
TCU	0	0	7	0	3	10
- Date: December 26, 2018
- Season: 2018
- Stadium: Chase Field
- Location: Phoenix, Arizona
- MVP: Sewo Olonilua (RB, TCU); Jaylinn Hawkins (S, California)
- Favorite: California by 1.5
- Referee: Marc Curles (SEC)
- Attendance: 33,121
- Payout: US$1,037,000

United States TV coverage
- Network: ESPN
- Announcers: Jason Benetti, Kelly Stouffer, and Olivia Dekker

International TV coverage
- Network: ESPN Deportes

The 2018 Cheez-It Bowl was a college football bowl game played on December 26, 2018, at Chase Field in Phoenix, Arizona, United States. The game was the 30th annual playing of the Cheez-It Bowl and the first played under that name. It featured the California Golden Bears from the Pac-12 Conference and the TCU Horned Frogs from the Big 12 Conference in the teams' first meeting. The game began at 7:00 p.m. MST and was broadcast on ESPN. It was one of the 2018–19 bowl games concluding the 2018 FBS football season.

TCU defeated California, 10–7, to win the game in overtime. California scored first on a rushing touchdown by quarterback Chase Garbers in the first quarter and held their 7–0 lead until a rushing touchdown by TCU running back Sewo Olonilua on the last play from scrimmage of the third quarter. The game was tied 7–7 at the end of regulation; California's overtime possession ended in an interception and TCU placekicker Jonathan Song made a 27-yard field goal on TCU's overtime possession, securing a victory for the Horned Frogs.

The teams combined to throw nine interceptions, tied for third-most in bowl game history. This led to media coverage that both praised the game for its entertainment value and criticized the low quality of play, including by use of the nickname Cheez-INT Bowl.

== Teams ==
The 30th Cheez-It Bowl matched the California Golden Bears from the Pac-12 Conference and the TCU Horned Frogs from the Big 12 Conference. (Note: This game was the 30th playing of the Cheez-It Bowl but the first using that name; the game had previously been known as the Copper Bowl (1989–96), Insight.com Bowl (1997–2001), Insight Bowl (2002–11), Buffalo Wild Wings Bowl (2012–13), and the Cactus Bowl (2014–17).) It was the first meeting between Cal and TCU. The bowl had maintained tie-ins with the Pac-12 and Big 12 since 2015; the Big Ten Conference replaced the Pac-12 in this respect beginning in 2019. The matchup was finalized on December 2, 2018, after both teams accepted their invitations from the bowl game. (Note: Teams must win at least half of their games (6–6 record in a typical 12-game FBS season) to be eligible for a bowl game. In 2018–19, there were more bowl-eligible teams than spots in bowl games, so four bowl-eligible teams did not receive invitations.)

=== California Golden Bears ===
The California Golden Bears represented the University of California, Berkeley and were led by second-year head coach Justin Wilcox. They opened their season with three straight wins, including over North Carolina and BYU, and as a result Cal was ranked No. 24 in the AP Poll released on September 23, 2018. (Note: Since 1936, the Associated Press (AP) has polled sportswriters and journalists to compile rankings, which are released weekly during the season. The poll expanded to include the top 25 college football teams in 1989. All further rankings mentioned in this article reflect the AP Poll.) The following week, they lost to No. 19 Oregon, starting a three-game losing streak. Their other ranked opponents were No. 15 Washington, whom they beat by two points on October 27, and No. 10 Washington State, to whom they lost by six points on November 3. They concluded the regular season with a 7–5 overall record and a 4–5 record in Pac-12 play.

This was Cal's second bowl game appearance in seven seasons, and it was their first since a defeat of Air Force in the 2015 Armed Forces Bowl.

=== TCU Horned Frogs ===
The TCU Horned Frogs represented Texas Christian University and were led by eighteenth-year head coach Gary Patterson. They were ranked No. 16 in the preseason AP Poll, but they had dropped out of the poll by September 23 following consecutive losses to No. 4 Ohio State and Texas. The Horned Frogs lost both of their remaining games against ranked competition: to No. 9 Oklahoma on October 20 and at No. 7 West Virginia on November 10. They won both of their final two regular season games to finish 6–6 overall and 4–5 in the Big 12.

The game marked TCU's fifth consecutive bowl appearance.

== Game summary ==
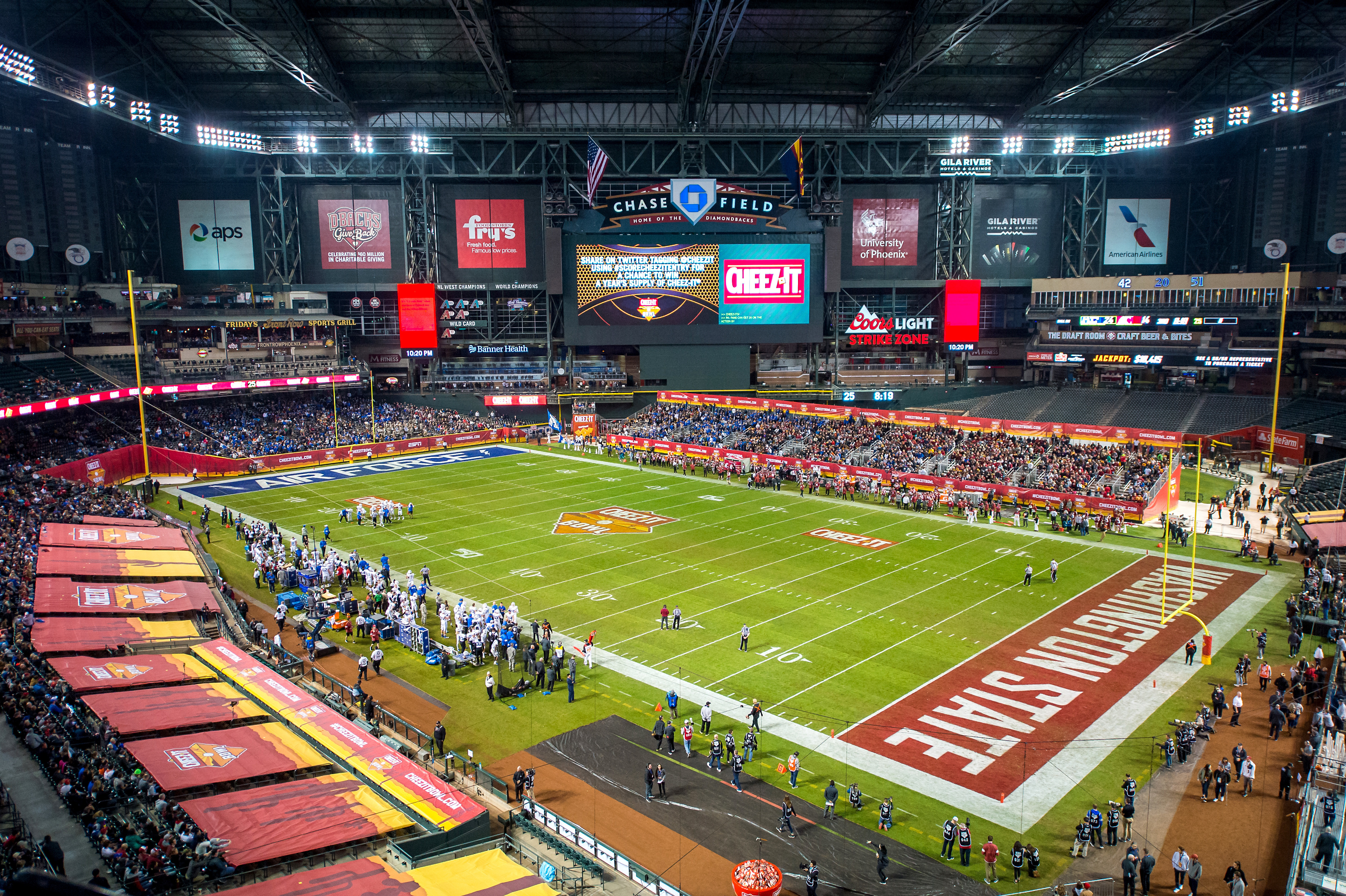
Chase Field configured for the 2019 Cheez-It Bowl

The Cheez-It Bowl was televised by ESPN with a commentary team of Jason Benetti, Kelly Stouffer, and Olivia Dekker. The ESPN Radio broadcast featured commentary from Kevin Brown, Andre Ware, and Shelley Smith. The game's officiating crew, representing the Southeastern Conference (SEC), was led by referee Marc Curles. The game was played indoors at Chase Field in Phoenix, Arizona. The pregame odds indicated that California was favored to win by 1.5 points, and the game's projected points total was set at 38.5 points.

The pregame ceremonial coin toss was won by TCU. They deferred their choice of possession of the ball to the second half, and California received the ball to begin the game.

=== First half ===
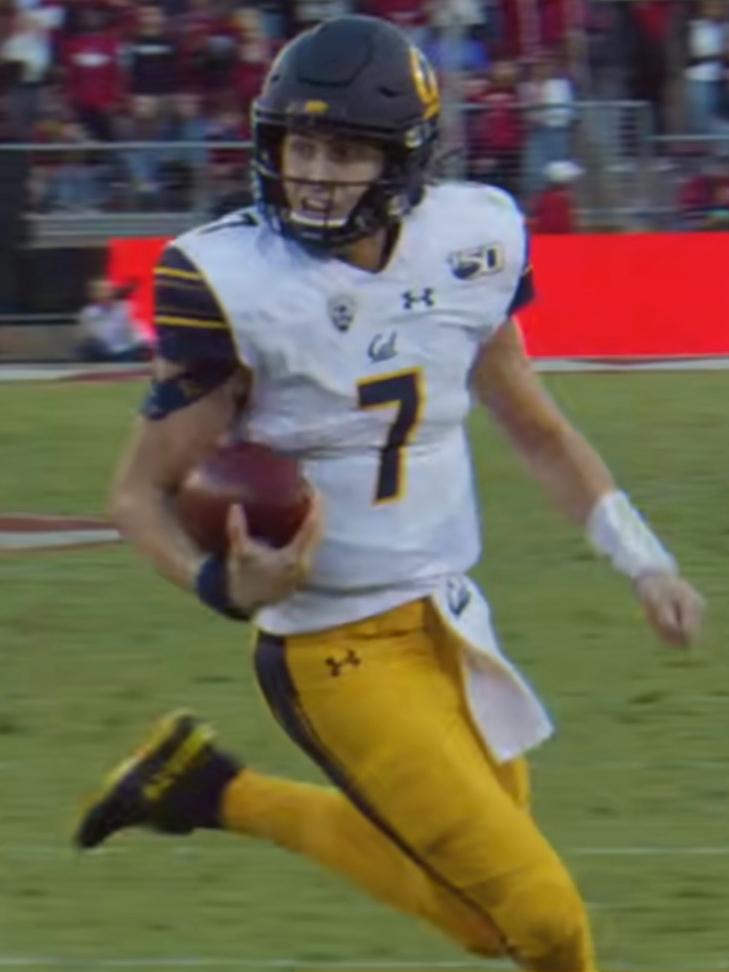
Chase Garbers (pictured in 2019) scored the only touchdown of the first half.

The game's opening kickoff by TCU's Cole Bunce went out-of-bounds, giving California possession of the ball at their own 35-yard line. Each of the first three drives of the game ended with a punt; California gained 32 and 18 yards, respectively, on each of their first two drives while TCU earned 15 yards before their first punt of the game. TCU began their second drive from their own 17-yard line; after a rush for no gain, quarterback Grayson Muehlstein's pass was intercepted by Cal safety Jaylinn Hawkins at the TCU 34-yard line. California followed with a 30-yard pass from quarterback Chase Garbers to wide receiver Kanawai Noa on their next play from scrimmage and immediately afterward scored the game's first points on a 4-yard touchdown rush by Garbers. Placekicker Greg Thomas made the extra point, giving Cal a 7–0 lead. TCU's ensuing series ended with the game's first three-and-out, giving Cal possession at their own 26-yard line. The Golden Bears advanced to the TCU 44-yard line in three plays before committing their first turnover, an interception by cornerback Julius Lewis on a pass by Garbers. The first quarter concluded several plays later with TCU in possession of the ball at the California 47-yard line.

On the first play of the second quarter, Muehlstein's pass was intercepted again by Hawkins, who returned it 29 yards to the TCU 17-yard line. Beginning their possession in the red zone, Cal gained 3 yards on a rush by running back Patrick Laird before free safety Niko Small intercepted a pass by Garbers in the end zone and returned it to the TCU 45-yard line. The Horned Frogs' ensuing possession was short-lived, though, as Muehlstein threw his third interception of the game two plays later. This pass was picked off by linebacker Jordan Kunaszyk and returned to the California 49-yard line with 12:45 to play in the half. The teams traded punts over the next eight minutes; Cal went three-and-out, TCU gained a first down following a 9-yard Sewo Olonilua rush before stalling out and punting several plays later, and Cal gained a net total of two yards on six plays before returning the ball to the Horned Frogs with 4:25 remaining. TCU resumed possession with the ball on their own 20-yard line and opened the series with four consecutive rushes by Olonilua for a total of 44 yards to reach the Cal 36-yard line. After gaining 4 yards on 3rd & 6 several plays later, TCU opted to go for it facing 4th & 2 at the Cal 28-yard line. On the play, Muehlstein was sacked by linebacker Evan Rambo, leading to a loss of 12 yards and a turnover on downs with twenty-eight seconds to play. Cal's final possession of the first half ended in an interception by cornerback Jeff Gladney; the half ended one play later with Cal taking a 7–0 lead into halftime.

=== Second half ===
TCU received possession to begin the second half and started their drive with three Olonilua rushes, gaining seventeen yards. Two plays later, Muehlstein threw his fourth interception—the third to Hawkins—at the Cal 32-yard line. Several punts followed: Cal reached TCU territory in two plays but gained eight yards afterwards and punted, TCU punted rather than attempting to convert 4th & 1, and Cal punted again despite a 33-yard pass completion from Chase Forrest to Jordan Duncan four plays earlier. The last of these punts was returned 58 yards by TCU's Jalen Reagor to the California 33-yard line; the Horned Frogs reached the red zone in three plays following rushes by Olonilua and Emari Demercado. They faced 4th & 2 from the Cal 14-yard line a short time later but converted on a 13-yard rush by Olonilua, who scored TCU's first points on a 1-yard rush the next play. Jonathan Song converted the extra point, tying the game at seven points apiece. The ensuing kickoff by Bunce was the last play of the third quarter.

The first drive of the fourth quarter was a Cal three-and-out which featured a net loss of ten yards on the first two plays and a punt on 4th & 20. TCU earned a first down in two plays to begin their next drive of but gained only three yards afterwards and punted on 4th & 7; each team went three-and-out on their next possession, leaving California with the ball on their own 11-yard line with roughly seven and a half minutes remaining. Cal's Christopher Brown Jr. rushed for a total of 25 yards on four carries to begin that series, which ended on the next play when Chase Forrest's pass was intercepted by safety Vernon Scott at the Cal 41-yard line. TCU shortly afterwards faced 4th & 2; on that play, Olonilua rushed for no gain, leading to a turnover on downs. Forrest passed for 22 yards to Maurice Ways on the first play of Cal's ensuing drive, but the Golden Bears ended the drive with a punt. TCU began the final drive of regulation with 2:08 remaining at their own 10-yard line; they crossed midfield in three plays and reached the Cal 27-yard line with three seconds left. Bunce missed a 44-yard field goal as time expired, ending regulation with a 7–7 score.

=== Overtime ===
TCU won the overtime coin toss and opted to play defense first. (Note: The winner of the overtime coin toss may choose to begin on offense or defense, or they can select which end of the field will be used. In overtime, each team gets one offensive possession with the ball at their opponents' 25-yard line.)

California's overtime possession began with a 3-yard rush by Christopher Brown Jr. and an incomplete pass by Forrest. On their third play, Forrest's pass was intercepted by Jawuan Johnson, who returned it 84 yards before being tackled at the California 5-yard line. TCU's possession, which would have ordinarily started on the California 25-yard line, instead began at the Cal 40-yard line because TCU's sports information director tripped on a down marker and fell onto the field, resulting in a 15-yard penalty. Each of TCU's next nine plays were rushes by either Olonilua or Demercado which totaled 30 yards. On 4th & 7 from the Cal 10-yard line, Jonathan Song made a 27-yard field goal, giving TCU a 10–7 victory.

=== Scoring summary ===
2018 Cheez-It Bowl

Quarter	1	2	3	4	OT	Total
California	7	0	0	0	0	7
TCU	0	0	7	0	3	10

at Chase Field • Phoenix, Arizona

- Date: December 26, 2018
- Game time: 7:00 p.m. MST
- Game weather: n/a (game played indoors)
- Game attendance: 33,121
- Referee: Marc Curles (SEC)
- TV: ESPN
- ESPN game summary

Scoring summary

Quarter	Time	Drive			Team	Scoring information	Score	
Quarter	Time	Plays	Yards	TOP	Team	Scoring information	California	TCU
1	4:33	2	34	0:29	California	Chase Garbers 4-yard touchdown run, Greg Thomas kick good	7	0
3	0:03	7	33	3:59	TCU	Sewo Olonilua 1-yard touchdown run, Jonathan Song kick good	7	7
OT		10	15		TCU	27-yard field goal by Jonathan Song	7	10
"TOP" = time of possession. For other American football terms, see Glossary of American football.							7	10

== Statistics ==
Team statistical comparison
Statistic	California	TCU
First downs	14	16
First downs rushing	6	14
First downs passing	8	2
First downs penalty	0	0
Third down efficiency	4–14	5–17
Fourth down efficiency	0–0	1–3
Total plays–net yards	63–264	80–290
Rushing attempts–net yards	30–100	59–262
Yards per rush	3.3	4.4
Yards passing	164	28
Pass completions–attempts	17–33	8–21
Interceptions thrown	5	4
Punt returns–total yards	1–0	3–70
Kickoff returns–total yards	0–0	1–28
Punts–average yardage	9–38.9	6–44.7
Fumbles–lost	0–0	0–0
Penalties–yards	3–20	3–30
Time of possession	25:22	34:38

California statistics
Golden Bears passing
	C–A	Yds	TD–INT
Chase Garbers	12–19	93	0–3
Chase Forrest	5–14	71	0–2
Golden Bears rushing
	Car	Yds	TD
Christopher Brown Jr.	14	57	0
Patrick Laird	7	29	0
Chase Garbers	7	23	1
Jeremiah Hawkins	1	−1	0
Chase Forrest	1	−8	0
Golden Bears receiving
	Rec	Yds	TD
Kanawai Noa	2	43	0
Moe Ways	3	37	0
Jordan Duncan	1	33	0
Nikko Remigio	5	21	0
McCallan Castles	1	15	0
Christopher Brown Jr.	3	14	0
Ian Bunting	1	4	0
Patrick Laird	1	−3	0

TCU statistics
Horned Frogs passing
	C–A	Yds	TD–INT
Grayson Muehlstein	7–20	27	0–4
Justin Rogers	1–1	1	0–0
Horned Frogs rushing
	Car	Yds	TD
Sewo Olonilua	32	194	1
Emari Demercado	13	51	0
Jalen Reagor	3	9	0
Grayson Muehlstein	9	8	0
Taye Barber	1	4	0
Justin Rogers	1	−4	0
Horned Frogs receiving
	Rec	Yds	TD
Jaelan Austin	1	15	0
Ni'Jeel Meeking	2	4	0
Jarrison Stewart	1	4	0
Taye Barber	2	3	0
Sewo Olonilua	1	1	0
Derius Davis	1	1	0

== Aftermath and reactions ==
Over the course of the game, the teams combined to throw nine interceptions, leading to the use of the nickname Cheez-INT Bowl live on air by ESPN and by analysts after the game. Six of the nine interceptions came in the first half; this alone tied the standing Cheez-It Bowl record for interceptions in a game, set when Arizona and New Mexico combined for six in the 1997 Insight.com Bowl. It tied the 1982 Liberty Bowl for third-most interceptions in a bowl game, behind only the 1968 Sun Bowl (12 interceptions) and the 1942 Orange Bowl (10).

Sam Cooper of Yahoo! Sports called the game's events "hilarious" and "absurd", Jason Kirk of SB Nation called the game "one of the most beautifully hideous bowls ever", Meredith Cash of Business Insider called it "an absolute calamity" and an "absolute disaster of a football game", and Coleman Bentley of Golf Digest called it "the best-worst bowl game ever".

TCU running back Sewo Olonilua was named offensive most valuable player (MVP), and California safety Jaylinn Hawkins was named defensive MVP. Hawkins set a Cheez-It Bowl record with three interceptions.
