= John Diarse =

American football player (born 1994)

No. 9
- Position: Wide receiver

Personal information
- Born: December 10, 1994 (age 31); Monroe, Louisiana, U.S.
- Listed height: 5 ft 11 in (1.80 m)
- Listed weight: 211 lb (96 kg)

Career information
- High school: Neville (Monroe)
- College: LSU (2013–2015); TCU (2016–2017)
- NFL draft: 2018: undrafted

Career history
- Denver Broncos (2018)*; San Antonio Commanders (2019); Massachusetts Pirates (2020)
- * Offseason or practice squad member only

John Diarse (born December 10, 1994) is an American former professional football player who was a wide receiver in the National Football League (NFL). He was signed by the Denver Broncos as an undrafted free agent in 2018. He played college football for the LSU Tigers and TCU Horned Frogs.

== Early life ==
Growing up in Monroe, Louisiana, Diarse was a football star at Neville High School, playing quarterback and safety for the Tigers. As a senior in 2012, he led the Tigers to the Louisiana Class 4A state championship game, was named Mr. Louisiana Football and selected to play in the US Army All-American Bowl.

== College career ==
=== LSU ===
After graduating high school a semester early, Diarse enrolled at Louisiana State University on January 11, 2013. He redshirted in the 2013 season before totalling 28 receptions for 412 yards and 3 touchdowns playing wide receiver for the Tigers in the 2014 and 2015 seasons. After graduating from LSU in three years with a degree in sports administration, Diarse transferred to TCU in Fort Worth, Texas.

=== TCU ===
Diarse started 21 games in his two seasons at TCU, totalling 68 receptions for 1,017 yards and 6 touchdowns. As a senior, he helped lead the Frogs to the program's first-ever berth in the Big 12 Championship Game and a win in the 2017 Alamo Bowl over Stanford. He graduated from TCU with master's degree in 2017.

== Professional career ==
Pre-draft measurables
Height	Weight	40-yard dash	10-yard split	20-yard split	20-yard shuttle	Three-cone drill	Vertical jump	Broad jump	Bench press
5 ft 11 in (1.80 m)	211 lb (96 kg)	4.58 s	1.67 s	2.64 s	4.40 s	7.19 s	33.5 in (0.85 m)	10 ft 1 in (3.07 m)	14 reps
All values are from Pro Day

=== Denver Broncos ===
After going undrafted in the 2018 NFL draft, Diarse signed with the Denver Broncos on May 1, 2018, as an undrafted free agent. He totaled 4 receptions for 68 yards playing in three Broncos' preseason games, but was released by the team during final team cuts on August 31.

=== San Antonio Commanders ===
On January 4, 2019, Diarse signed with the San Antonio Commanders of the Alliance of American Football. The league ceased operations in April 2019.
