= San Antonio Christian School =

Location
- 19202 Redland Road; San Antonio, Texas; United States; 29.621326°N 98.458839°W

Information
- Type: Private Christian
- Religious affiliation: Non-denominational Christian
- Established: 1972
- Superintendent: Dr. Rob Brown
- CEEB code: 446147
- Faculty: 92
- Grades: PK–12
- Enrollment: 937
- Average class size: 12 students
- Student to teacher ratio: 6:1
- Campus: 63 acres (250,000 m^{2})
- Colors: Maroon Gold and White
- Song: Alma Mater
- Athletics: Baseball, Volleyball, Cross Country, Football, Basketball, Soccer, Swimming, Wrestling, Tennis, Track & Field, Golf, Softball, and Cheerleading
- Mascot: Lion
- Tuition: $5,250 - $15,850
- Website: www.sachristian.org

San Antonio Christian School, SACS for short, is a private, non-denominational Christian school in San Antonio, Texas. It was established in 1972 to provide a Christ-centered, college preparatory education (grades PK-12). It is accredited by the Association of Christian Schools International and the Southern Association of Colleges and Schools.

SACS competes in the Texas Association of Private and Parochial Schools as a 5A school in Division 2. Other extracurricular activities include band, 4-H, art, theater, and journalism.

== Notable alumni ==
- Corey Robinson, broadcaster for Notre Dame Football on NBC, former wide-receiver for the Notre Dame Fighting Irish
- Justin Robinson, basketball forward who plays professionally in Israel; played college basketball at Duke
