= 2015 TCU Horned Frogs football team =

American college football season

2015 TCU Horned Frogs football

Alamo Bowl champion

Alamo Bowl, W 47–41^{3OT} vs. Oregon
- Conference: Big 12 Conference

Ranking
- Coaches: No. 7
- AP: No. 7
- Record: 11–2 (7–2 Big 12)
- Head coach: Gary Patterson (15th season)
- Co-offensive coordinators: Doug Meacham (2nd season); Sonny Cumbie (2nd season)
- Offensive scheme: Air raid
- Co-defensive coordinators: Chad Glasgow (1st season); DeMontie Cross (1st season)
- Base defense: 4–2–5
- Home stadium: Amon G. Carter Stadium

2015 Big 12 Conference football standings
	Conf.			Overall
Team	W		L	W		L
No. 5 Oklahoma $^	8	–	1	11	–	2
No. 20 Oklahoma State	7	–	2	10	–	3
No. 7 TCU	7	–	2	11	–	2
No. 13 Baylor	6	–	3	10	–	3
West Virginia	4	–	5	8	–	5
Texas Tech	4	–	5	7	–	6
Texas	4	–	5	5	–	7
Kansas State	3	–	6	6	–	7
Iowa State	2	–	7	3	–	9
Kansas	0	–	9	0	–	12
^ – College Football Playoff participant; $ – Conference champion; Rankings from AP Poll

The 2015 TCU Horned Frogs football team represented Texas Christian University (TCU) in the 2015 NCAA Division I FBS football season. The 120th TCU football team played as a member of the Big 12 Conference (Big 12), led by 15th-year head coach Gary Patterson. The Horned Frogs played their home games at Amon G. Carter Stadium in Fort Worth, Texas.

TCU (11–2, 7–2) finished the season ranked #7 in the nation after a victory in the Alamo Bowl. The season marked the Horned Frogs' fifth top-10 finish and sixth top-15 finish in the last 8 seasons. The Horned Frogs notched their sixth 11+ win season in the last 8 years and their tenth 10+ win season in the 15-year Gary Patterson era.

== Preseason ==
=== Recruiting ===
National Signing Day unofficially kicked off the new season on February 5, 2015. The Horned Frogs inked 21 high school seniors to National Letters of Intent and added two additional playmakers by grayshirt. Hoping to build on the success of the new up-tempo offense installed by Co-offensive coordinators Doug Meacham and Sonny Cumbie in 2014, the 2015 signing class included six wide receivers. Three signees graduated from high school in December 2014 and enrolled at TCU for the spring term.

College recruiting
Name	Hometown	School	Height	Weight	Commit date
Deshawn Raymond; CB	Metairie, LA	East Jefferson	6 ft 1 in (1.85 m)	190 lb (86 kg)	Oct 31, 2014
Deshawn Raymond; CB	Recruit ratings: Scout: Rivals: 247Sports: ESPN:				
Breylin Mitchell; DE	Round Rock, TX	Round Rock	6 ft 3 in (1.91 m)	253 lb (115 kg)	Jul 24, 2013
Breylin Mitchell; DE	Recruit ratings: Scout: Rivals: 247Sports: ESPN:				
Sam Awolope; OT	Missouri City, TX	Fort Bend Marshall	6 ft 5 in (1.96 m)	270 lb (120 kg)	Dec 15, 2014
Sam Awolope; OT	Recruit ratings: Scout: Rivals: 247Sports: ESPN:				
Tony James; ATH	Arlington, TX	Bowie	5 ft 9.5 in (1.77 m)	151 lb (68 kg)	Nov 30, 2013
Tony James; ATH	Recruit ratings: Scout: Rivals: 247Sports: ESPN:				
Jarrison Stewart; WR	Mesquite, TX	Horn	5 ft 11 in (1.80 m)	172 lb (78 kg)	Jan 26, 2014
Jarrison Stewart; WR	Recruit ratings: Scout: Rivals: 247Sports: ESPN:				
Jaelan Austin; WR	Grand Prairie, TX	South Grand Prairie	6 ft 2.5 in (1.89 m)	190 lb (86 kg)	Aug 1, 2014
Jaelan Austin; WR	Recruit ratings: Scout: Rivals: 247Sports: ESPN:				
Semaj Thomas; LB	Fort Worth, TX	Southwest	6 ft 0 in (1.83 m)	231 lb (105 kg)	Jan 26, 2014
Semaj Thomas; LB	Recruit ratings: Scout: Rivals: 247Sports: ESPN:				
Joseph Broadnax; DT	Dallas, TX	Bryan Adams	6 ft 0 in (1.83 m)	303 lb (137 kg)	Feb 27, 2014
Joseph Broadnax; DT	Recruit ratings: Scout: Rivals: 247Sports: ESPN:				
Alec Dunham; LB	Coldspring, TX	Coldspring-Oakhurst	6 ft 0 in (1.83 m)	210 lb (95 kg)	Nov 6, 2013
Alec Dunham; LB	Recruit ratings: Scout: Rivals: 247Sports: ESPN:				
Jozie Milton; DT	Clinton, LA	Silliman Institute	6 ft 3 in (1.91 m)	294 lb (133 kg)	Dec 13, 2014
Jozie Milton; DT	Recruit ratings: Scout: Rivals: 247Sports: ESPN:				
Tre'Vontae Hights; ATH	Yoakum, TX	Yoakum	6 ft 2 in (1.88 m)	175 lb (79 kg)	Apr 7, 2014
Tre'Vontae Hights; ATH	Recruit ratings: Scout: Rivals: 247Sports: ESPN:				
KaVontae Turpin; WR	Monroe, LA	Neville	5 ft 9 in (1.75 m)	165 lb (75 kg)	Jan 25, 2015
KaVontae Turpin; WR	Recruit ratings: Scout: Rivals: 247Sports: ESPN:				
Tipa Galeai; DE	Euless, TX	Trinity	6 ft 5.5 in (1.97 m)	215 lb (98 kg)	Dec 18, 2014
Tipa Galeai; DE	Recruit ratings: Scout: Rivals: 247Sports: ESPN:				
Niko Small; CB	Arlington, TX	Bowie	5 ft 10 in (1.78 m)	183 lb (83 kg)	Jun 18, 2014
Niko Small; CB	Recruit ratings: Scout: Rivals: 247Sports: ESPN:				
Cordel Iwuagwu; OG	Houston, TX	Westfield	6 ft 3 in (1.91 m)	275 lb (125 kg)	Jun 7, 2014
Cordel Iwuagwu; OG	Recruit ratings: Scout: Rivals: 247Sports: ESPN:				
Mike Freeze; LB	Graham, TX	Graham	6 ft 2 in (1.88 m)	215 lb (98 kg)	May 4, 2014
Mike Freeze; LB	Recruit ratings: Scout: Rivals: 247Sports: ESPN:				
Montrel Wilson; S	Keller, TX	Fossil Ridge	6 ft 2 in (1.88 m)	195 lb (88 kg)	Dec 14, 2014
Montrel Wilson; S	Recruit ratings: Scout: Rivals: 247Sports: ESPN:				
David Bolisomi; OT	Denton, TX	Ryan	6 ft 6 in (1.98 m)	290 lb (130 kg)	Dec 1, 2014
David Bolisomi; OT	Recruit ratings: Scout: Rivals: 247Sports: ESPN:				
Julius Lewis; ATH	Mansfield, TX	Mansfield	5 ft 11 in (1.80 m)	170 lb (77 kg)	Jun 10, 2014
Julius Lewis; ATH	Recruit ratings: Scout: Rivals: 247Sports: ESPN:				
Arico Evans; WR	Dallas, TX	Hillcrest	6 ft 1 in (1.85 m)	190 lb (86 kg)	Jan 25, 2015
Arico Evans; WR	Recruit ratings: Scout: Rivals: 247Sports: ESPN:				
Jeff Gladney; ATH	New Boston, TX	New Boston	6 ft 0 in (1.83 m)	174 lb (79 kg)	Jun 5, 2014
Jeff Gladney; ATH	Recruit ratings: Scout: Rivals: 247Sports: ESPN:				
Overall recruit ranking: Scout: 27 Rivals: 34 247Sports: 42 ESPN: 37
Note: In many cases, Scout, Rivals, 247Sports, On3, and ESPN may conflict in their listings of height and weight.; In these cases, the average was taken. ESPN grades are on a 100-point scale.; Sources: "2015 TCU Football Commitment List". Rivals.; "2015 Team Ranking". Rivals.com.

In addition to the above-listed signees, TCU added consensus 3-star wide receive Darrion Flowers (5'9", 170, Sam Houston HS, Arlington, TX), who accepted a track and field scholarship for 2015–16 and will join the football team before the 2016 season. Similarly, TCU added kicker Jonathan Song (5'9", 160, All Saints HS, Fort Worth, TX), who will also grayshirt during the 2015–16 season and count against the 2016 recruiting class. Flowers and Song will fill areas of need in 2016 after the loss of PK, P, and WRs at the conclusion of the 2015 season.

It was widely reported in early 2015 that former Southlake Carroll standout and Gatorade Football Player of the Year Kenny Hill would transfer from Texas A&M to TCU before the 2015 season. Hill confirmed his transfer on May 22, 2015, and enrolled for the summer term. As a transfer, Hill can practice with the 2015 team, but he will be ineligible for play until 2016.

During the summer, TCU added walk-on athlete Rocket Ismail, Jr. (5'11", 176, Ranchview HS, Carrollton, TX), son of All-American, Notre Dame legend and former CFL and NFL player Raghib "Rocket" Ismail. Ismail is immediately eligible and joins a number of additional walk-ons on the 2015 roster.

=== Coaching staff changes ===
Patterson formally announced coaching staff changes on February 25, 2015. Following the retirement of long-time TCU defensive coordinator Dick Bumpas, Patterson promoted safeties coach and former Texas Tech defensive coordinator Chad Glasgow and TCU linebackers coach DeMontie Cross to co-defensive coordinators. TCU director of player personnel Dan Sharp was reassigned as the defensive line coach, and three-year graduate assistant Paul Gonzales was named the Frogs' cornerbacks coach. Further coaching staff changes include the shuffling and addition of analysis and graduate assistants, including the addition of former TCU linebacker and 2009 5th-round draft pick Jason Phillips.

=== Spring practice ===
The Horned Frogs' formal spring practice ran from February 28 through April 10. In their April 9 spring game, the Frogs were without quarterback Trevone Boykin, who underwent minor surgery on his non-throwing wrist prior to the final week of spring practice. The focus of spring ball was squarely on the defense, where Coach Patterson must replace 5 starters, including 2 linebackers. Offensive coordinators Meacham and Cumbie, meanwhile, focused on improving the year-old up-tempo offense and identifying a backup quarterback.

Spring 2015 "way-too-early" pre-season rankings from most major sports news outlets, issued after the end of the 2014 season tabbed the 2015 Horned Frogs at #1 (ESPN-Martin Rickman), #2 (Sports Illustrated), #2 (CBSSports), and #2 (ESPN-Mark Schlabach).

=== Fall camp ===
In July, TCU was selected as the overwhelming favorite to win the Big 12 regular season crown, and Trevone Boykin emerged as the frontrunner in the 2015 Heisman Trophy race. During Big 12 media days, the media's attention fell heavily upon league frontrunners TCU and Baylor. Fall camp began on August 4, 2015.

Little news was released by Gary Patterson during the Horned Frogs' fall camp. Rumors of injuries sustained by starting wide receivers Josh Doctson and Deante Gray, as well as starting defensive tackle Davion Pierson were unconfirmed, and Patterson revealed in late August that Doctson would likely play in the opener at Minnesota while Gray's readiness for the September 3 game remained questionable. Late in fall camp, junior wide receiver and special teams punt returner Cameron Echols-Luper, son of TCU running backs coach Curtis Luper, announced his transfer to Arkansas State, where Echols-Luper hopes to play quarterback.

TCU was ranked #2 in both the preseason Amway (USA Today) Coaches Poll and the preseason AP Poll.

== Schedule ==
TCU was one of only four teams in the country to play six road games against Power 5 Conference opponents. The Horned Frogs' road schedule included a non-conference season opener at Minnesota and five Big 12 road games. The Frogs will had only one mid-season bye during week eight of the regular season.

Date	Time	Opponent	Rank	Site	TV	Result	Attendance
September 3	8:00 p.m.	at Minnesota*	No. 2	TCF Bank Stadium; Minneapolis, MN	ESPN	W 23–17	54,147
September 12	2:30 p.m.	Stephen F. Austin*	No. 3	Amon G. Carter Stadium; Fort Worth, TX	FS1	W 70–7	45,786
September 19	7:00 p.m.	SMU*	No. 3	Amon G. Carter Stadium; Fort Worth, TX (Battle for the Iron Skillet)	FSN	W 56–37	48,127
September 26	3:45 p.m.	at Texas Tech	No. 3	Jones AT&T Stadium; Lubbock, TX (rivalry)	FOX	W 55–52	61,283
October 3	11:00 a.m.	Texas^{†}	No. 4	Amon G. Carter Stadium; Fort Worth, TX (rivalry)	ABC	W 50–7	48,694
October 10	6:30 p.m.	at Kansas State	No. 2	Bill Snyder Family Football Stadium; Manhattan, KS	FOX	W 52–45	53,671
October 17	6:00 p.m.	at Iowa State	No. 3	Jack Trice Stadium; Ames, IA	ESPN2	W 45–21	52,480
October 29	6:30 p.m.	West Virginia	No. 5	Amon G. Carter Stadium; Fort Worth, TX	FS1	W 40–10	45,947
November 7	2:30 p.m.	at No. 14 Oklahoma State	No. 8	Boone Pickens Stadium; Stillwater, OK	FOX	L 29–49	59,061
November 14	11:00 a.m.	Kansas	No. 15	Amon G. Carter Stadium; Fort Worth, TX	FS1	W 23–17	44,375
November 21	7:00 p.m.	at No. 7 Oklahoma	No. 18	Gaylord Family Oklahoma Memorial Stadium; Norman, OK	ABC	L 29–30	85,821
November 27	6:30 p.m.	No. 7 Baylor	No. 19	Amon G. Carter Stadium; Fort Worth, TX (rivalry)	ESPN	W 28–21 ^{2OT}	47,675
January 2, 2016	5:45 p.m.	vs. No. 15 Oregon*	No. 11	Alamodome; San Antonio, TX (Alamo Bowl)	ESPN	W 47–41 ^{3OT}	64,569
*Non-conference game; ^{†}Homecoming; Rankings from AP Poll and CFP Rankings after November 3 released prior to game; All times are in Central time

Schedule source: GoFrogs.com and FBschedules.com

== Rankings ==
Ranking movements Legend: ██ Increase in ranking ██ Decrease in ranking ( ) = First-place votes
	Week															
Poll	Pre	1	2	3	4	5	6	7	8	9	10	11	12	13	14	Final
AP	2	3	3	3	4	2 (5)	3 (3)	4 (3)	5 (3)	5 (4)	13	11	15	11	11	7
Coaches	2 (1)	3	3	2	3	2 (4)	3 (5)	3 (4)	3 (2)	3 (4)	12	11	16	11	10	7
CFP	Not released									8	15	18	19	11	11	Not released

== Game summaries ==
=== At Minnesota ===
No. 2 TCU Horned Frogs at Minnesota Golden Gophers – Game Summary

Quarter	1	2	3	4	Total
No. 2 Horned Frogs	10	0	10	3	23
Golden Gophers	0	3	7	7	17

at TCF Bank Stadium • Minneapolis, Minnesota

- Date: September 3
- Game time: 8:00 p.m. CDT
- Game weather: Clear, 82 °F (28 °C), wind E 15 mph (24 km/h)
- Game attendance: 54,147 (stadium record)
- Referee: Cooper Castleberry
- TV announcers (ESPN): Dave Pasch (play-by-play), Brian Griese (color), Tom Luginbill (sideline)
- Sources: TCU Game Notes and GoFrogs.com

Game information

First Quarter

- 06:58 – TCU – Jaden Oberkrom 53-yd field goal, TCU 3 – MINN 0
- 05:46 – TCU – Josh Doctson 11-yd pass from Trevone Boykin (Jaden Oberkrom, kick), TCU 10 – MINN 0

Second Quarter

- 05:22 – MINN – Ryan Santoso 42-yd field goal, TCU 10 – MINN 3

Third Quarter

- 12:03 – TCU – Trevone Boykin 19-yd run (Jaden Oberkrom, kick), TCU 17 – MINN 3
- 03:44 – MINN – Rodney Smith 1-yd run (Ryan Santoso, kick), TCU 17 – MINN 10
- 00:36 – TCU – Jaden Oberkrom 45-yd field goal, TCU 20 – MINN 10

Fourth Quarter

- 07:33 – TCU – Jaden Oberkrom 33-yd field goal, TCU 23 – MINN 10
- 01:32 – MINN – K. J. Maye 22-yd pass from Mitch Leidner (Ryan Santoso, kick), TCU 23 – MINN 17

Statistics	TCU	MINN
First downs	25	18
Total yards	449	341
Rushing yards	203	144
Passing yards	246	197
Turnovers	2	2
Time of possession	34:50	25:10

Team	Category	Player	Statistics
TCU	Passing	Trevone Boykin	26/42, 246 yards, TD, INT
TCU	Rushing	Trevone Boykin	18 rushes, 92 yards, TD
TCU	Receiving	Josh Doctson	8 receptions, 84 yards, TD
Minnesota	Passing	Mitch Leidner	19/35, 197 yards, TD
Minnesota	Rushing	Rodney Smith	16 rushes, 88 yards, TD
Minnesota	Receiving	K. J. Maye	4 receptions, 73 yards, TD

TCU was one of only three consensus-top 25 teams to play a true road game against a Power 5 Conference opponent in week one, joining the #1 Ohio State Buckeyes at Virginia Tech and the #20 Stanford Cardinal at Northwestern. Of the three, only #2 TCU and #1 Ohio State returned home with victories.

=== Stephen F. Austin ===
Stephen F. Austin Lumberjacks at No. 3 TCU Horned Frogs – Game Summary

Quarter	1	2	3	4	Total
Lumberjacks	0	0	0	7	7
No. 3 Horned Frogs	21	14	21	14	70

at Amon G. Carter Stadium • Fort Worth, Texas

- Date: September 12
- Game time: 2:30 p.m. CDT
- Game weather: Sunny and clear, 84 °F (29 °C), wind NE 9 mph (14 km/h)
- Game attendance: 45,786
- Referee: Scott Campbell
- TV announcers (FS1): Joe Davis (play-by-play), Brady Quinn (color), Kris Budden (sideline)
- Sources: GoFrogs.com; TCU Pre-game Notes

Game information

First Quarter

- 06:51 – TCU – Aaron Green 2-yd run (Jaden Oberkrom, kick), SFA 0 – TCU 7
- 03:40 – TCU – Aaron Green 7-yd run (Jaden Oberkrom, kick), SFA 0 – TCU 14
- 01:57 – TCU – Kolby Listenbee 60-yd pass from Trevone Boykin (Jaden Oberkrom, kick), SFA 0 – TCU 21

Second Quarter

- 13:27 – TCU – KaVontae Turpin 6-yd pass from Trevone Boykin (Jaden Oberkrom, kick), SFA 0 – TCU 28
- 11:34 – TCU – Ja"juan Story 9-yd pass from Trevone Boykin (Jaden Oberkrom, kick), SFA 0 – TCU 35

Third Quarter

- 11:23 – TCU – Emanuel Porter 3-yd pass from Trevone Boykin (Jaden Oberkrom, kick), SFA 0 – TCU 42
- 09:37 – TCU – Denzel Johnson 50-yd interception return (Jaden Oberkrom, kick), SFA 0 – TCU 49
- 06:29 – TCU – Kyle Hicks 1-yd run (Jaden Oberkrom, kick), SFA 0 – TCU 56

Fourth Quarter

- 14:25 – TCU – Jaelan Austin 16-yd pass from Bram Kohlhausen (Jaden Oberkrom, kick), SFA 0 – TCU 63
- 14:02 – SFA – Loren Easly 75-yd run (Nick Bruno, kick), SFA 7 – TCU 63
- 04:02 – TCU – Colten Christensen 3-yd run (Jonathan Song, kick), SFA 7 – TCU 70

Statistics	SFA	TCU
First downs	8	30
Total yards	167	627
Rushing yards	146	224
Passing yards	21	403
Turnovers	3	1
Time of possession	27:07	32:53

Team	Category	Player	Statistics
Stephen F. Austin	Passing	Hunter Taylor	2/10, 12 yards, INT
Stephen F. Austin	Rushing	Loren Easly	6 rushes, 93 yards, TD
Stephen F. Austin	Receiving	Cole Carter	1 reception, 10 yards
TCU	Passing	Trevone Boykin	18/27, 285 yards, 4 TD, INT
TCU	Rushing	Trevorris Johnson	9 rushes, 71 yards
TCU	Receiving	Kolby Listenbee	6 receptions, 142 yards, TD

The 70 points scored by the Horned Frogs in this game marked the second-highest score of any TCU Horned Frogs football team in the program's 120-year history (the record of 82 points was set against the Texas Tech Red Raiders in 2014). This win extended TCU's winning streak to 10 games and improved Gary Patterson's record to 21–1 when coaching a TCU team ranked in the top 5 and 32–3 when coaching a TCU team ranked in the top 10.

=== SMU ===
SMU Mustangs at No. 3 TCU Horned Frogs – Game Summary

Quarter	1	2	3	4	Total
Mustangs	10	7	17	3	37
No. 3 Horned Frogs	14	14	14	14	56

at Amon G. Carter Stadium • Fort Worth, Texas

- Date: September 19
- Game time: 7:00 p.m. CDT
- Game weather: Partly cloudy, 89 °F (32 °C), wind NE 9 mph (14 km/h)
- Game attendance: 48,127
- Referee: Adam Savoie
- TV announcers (FSN): Mark Followill (play-by-play), Brian Baldinger (color), Lesley McCaslin (sideline)
- Sources: GoFrogs.com; TCU Pre-game Notes

Game information

First Quarter

- 11:44 – SMU – Xavier Jones 2-yd run (Chad Hedlund, kick), SMU 7 – TCU 0
- 10:57 – TCU – KaVontae Turpin 61-yd pass from Trevone Boykin (Jaden Oberkrom, kick), SMU 7 – TCU 7
- 05:00 – SMU – Chad Hedlund 22-yd field goal, SMU 10 – TCU 7
- 02:09 – TCU – Aaron Green 1-yd run (Jaden Oberkrom, kick), SMU 10 – TCU 14

Second Quarter

- 10:16 – TCU – Josh Doctson 29-yd pass (Jaden Oberkrom, kick), SMU 10 – TCU 21
- 02:01 – TCU – Trevone Boykin 20-yd run (Jaden Oberkrom, kick), SMU 10 – TCU 28
- 00:12 – SMU – Courtland Sutton 1-yd pass from Matt Davis (Chad Hedlund, kick), SMU 17 – TCU 28

Third Quarter

- 12:59 – TCU – Kolby Listenbee 31-yd pass from Trevone Boykin (Jaden Oberkrom, kick), SMU 17 – TCU 35
- 09:18 – TCU – Dominic Merka 19-yd pass from Trevone Boykin (Jaden Oberkrom, kick), SMU 17 – TCU 42
- 06:42 – SMU – Matt Davis 4-yd run (Chad Hedlund, kick), SMU 24 – TCU 42
- 05:23 – SMU – Matt Davis 1-yd run (Chad Hedlund, kick), SMU 31 – TCU 42
- 00:00 – SMU – Chad Hedlund 21-yd field goal, SMU 34 – TCU 42

Fourth Quarter

- 08:20 – SMU – Chad Hedlund 32-yd field goal, SMU 37 – TCU 42

0*6:32 – TCU – Josh Doctson 42-yd pass from Trevone Boykin (Jaden Oberkrom, kick), SMU 37 – TCU 49

- 00:56 – TCU – Aaron Green 1-yd run (Jaden Oberkrom, kick), SMU 37 – TCU 56

Statistics	SMU	TCU
First downs	23	28
Total yards	508	720
Rushing yards	174	266
Passing yards	334	454
Turnovers	0	1
Time of possession	32:57	27:03

Team	Category	Player	Statistics
SMU	Passing	Matt Davis	18/32, 334 yards, TD
SMU	Rushing	Matt Davis	17 rushes, 62 yards, TD
SMU	Receiving	Courtland Sutton	4 receptions, 115 yards, TD
TCU	Passing	Trevone Boykin	21/30, 454 yards, 5 TD, INT
TCU	Rushing	Aaron Green	21 rushes, 164 yards, 2 TD
TCU	Receiving	Josh Doctson	5 receptions, 171 yards, 2 TD

This 95th Battle for the Iron Skillet came 100 years after the Frogs and Mustangs first met in October 1915 at TCU's Clark Field, a meeting TCU won 43–0. The Horned Frogs celebrated Family Weekend and Clark Society Weekend during this September 19, 2015, home game, and the TCU Lettermen's Association inducted several new members into its Hall of Fame as part of the weekend's festivities.

=== At Texas Tech ===
No. 3 TCU Horned Frogs at Texas Tech Red Raiders – Game summary

Quarter	1	2	3	4	Total
No. 3 Horned Frogs	16	17	7	15	55
Red Raiders	14	14	10	14	52

at Jones AT&T Stadium, Lubbock, Texas

- Date: September 26
- Game time: 3:45 p.m. CDT
- Game weather: Cloudy, 78 °F (26 °C)
- Game attendance: 61,283
- Referee: Brad Van Vark
- TV announcers (Fox): Joe Davis, Brady Quinn, and Kris Budden
- Box Score

Game information
First quarter
- TCU – Josh Doctson 9-yard pass from Trevone Boykin (Jaden Oberkrom kick), 10:51. Horned Frogs 7–0. Drive: 8 plays, 80 yards, 2:54.
- TTU – DeAndre Washington 1-yard run (Clayton Hatfield kick), 9:42. Tied 7–7. Drive: 4 plays, 86 yards, 1:09.
- TCU – Patrick Mahoms sacked in own end zone, 7:22. Horned Frogs 9–7.
- TCU – Aaron Green 1-yard run (Jaden Oberkrom kick), 3:34. Horned Frogs 16–7. Drive: 10 plays, 64 yards, 3:48.
- TTU – DeAndre Washington 26-yard run (Clayton Hatfiel, kick), 2:02. Horned Frogs 16–14. Drive: 4 plays, 49 yards, 1:32.

Second quarter

- TTU – Jakeem Grant 45-yard pass from Patrick Mahomes (Clayton Hatfield kick), 13:22. Red Raiders 21–16. Drive: 3 plays, 63 yards, 0:44.
- TCU – Jaden Oberkrom 42-yard field goal, 9:46. Red Raiders 21–19. Drive: 6 plays, 37 yards, 1:46.
- TCU – Josh Doctson 52-yard pass from Trevone Boykin (Jaden Oberkrom kick), 6:05. Horned Frogs 26–21. Drive: 4 plays, 62 yards, 0:53.
- TTU – Patrick Mahomes 4-yard run (Clayton Hatfiel, kick), 3:26. Red Raiders 28–26. Drive: 11 plays, 75 yards, 2:39.
- TCU – Josh Doctson 5-yard pass from Trevone Boykin (Jaden Oberkrom kick), 0:15. Horned Frogs 33–28. Drive: 11 plays, 75 yards, 3:11.

Third quarter

- TTU – DeAndre Washington 2-yard run (Clayton Hatfield kick), 6:28. Red Raiders 35–33. Drive: 9 plays, 80 yards, 3:47.
- TCU – Aaron Green 7-yard run (Jaden Oberkrom kick), 2:58. Horned Frogs 40–35. Drive: 10 plays, 75 yards, 3:30.
- TTU – Clayton Hatfield 37-yd field goal, 0:44. Horned Frogs 40–38. Drive: 8 plays, 59 yards, 2:14.

Fourth quarter

- TTU – DeAndre Washington 1-yard run (Clayton Hatfield kick), 10:53. Red Raiders 45–40. Drive: 12 plays, 86 yards, 3:26.
- TCU – Kyle Hicks 22-yd run (Shaun Nixon pass to Trevone Boykin), 8:22. Horned Frogs 48–45. Drive: 6 plays, 79 yards, 2:31.
- TTU – Justin Stockton 50-yard pass from Patrick Mahomes (Clayton Hatfield kick), 5:55. Red Raiders 52–48. Drive: 8 plays, 75 yards, 2:27.
- TCU – Aaron Green 4-yard pass from Trevone Boykin (Jaden Oberkrom kick), 0:23. Horned Frogs 55–52. Drive: 9 plays, 53 yards, 2:09.

Statistics	TCU	TTU
First downs	38	32
Total yards	750	607
Rushing yards	247	215
Passing yards	503	392
Turnovers	0	0
Time of possession	34:57	25:03

Team	Category	Player	Statistics
TCU	Passing	Trevone Boykin	34/54, 485 yards, 4 TD
TCU	Rushing	Aaron Green	28 rushes, 162 yards, 2 TD
TCU	Receiving	Josh Doctson	18 receptions, 267 yards, 3 TD
Texas Tech	Passing	Patrick Mahomes	25/45, 392 yards, 2 TD
Texas Tech	Rushing	DeAndré Washington	22 rushes, 188 yards, 4 TD
Texas Tech	Receiving	Jakeem Grant	8 receptions, 126 yards, TD

The Horned Frogs' thrilling 55–52 last-minute win over Texas Tech marked TCU's first win in Lubbock, Texas, since 1991. TCU's 750 yards of offense was the third-most in school history (the record was set against Texas Tech in 2014, with 785). Trevone Boykin's 485 passing yards was the second-most by a quarterback in school history. Josh Doctson's 267 receiving yards set a new TCU single-game record, and his 18 receptions tied the TCU record.

=== Texas ===
Texas Longhorns at No. 4 TCU Horned Frogs – Game Summary

Quarter	1	2	3	4	Total
Longhorns	0	0	0	7	7
No. 4 Horned Frogs	30	7	10	3	50

at Amon G. Carter Stadium • Fort Worth, Texas

- Date: October 3
- Game time: 11:00 a.m. CDT
- Game weather: Partly cloudy, 68 °F (20 °C), wind SE 6 mph (9.7 km/h)
- Game attendance: 48,694
- Referee: Dan Romeo
- TV announcers (ABC): Sean McDonough (play-by-play), Chris Spielman (color), Todd McShay (sideline)
- Sources: TCU Game Notes, GoFrogs.com

Game information
First quarter
- TCU – KaVontae Turpin 13-yard pass from Trevone Boykin (Jaden Oberkrom kick), 12:35. Horned Frogs 7–0. Drive: 4 plays, 45 yards, 0:57.
- TCU – Safety, 11:33. Horned Frogs 9–0.
- TCU – Josh Doctson 15-yard pass from Trevone Boykin (Jaden Oberkrom kick), 9:48. Horned Frogs 16–0. Drive: 5 plays, 50 yards, 1:45.
- – TCU – KaVontae Turpin 49-yard pass from Trevone Boykin (Jaden Oberkrom kick), 5:01. Horned Frogs 23–0. Drive: 3 plays, 64 yards, 0:43.
- TCU – Josh Doctson 29-yard pass from Shaun Nixon (Jaden Oberkrom, kick), 0:26. Horned Frogs 30–0. Drive: 6 plays, 62 yards, 2:27.

Second quarter

- TCU – KaVontae Turpin 50-yard pass from Trevone Boykin (Jaden Oberkrom kick), 0:48. Horned Frogs 37–0. Drive: 4 plays, 78 yards, 0:36.

Third quarter

- TCU – KaVontae Turpin 12-yd pass from Trevone Boykin (Jaden Oberkrom kick), 12:14. Horned Frogs 44–0. Drive: 5 plays, 79 yards, 1:48.
- TCU – Jaden Oberkrom 23-yard field goal, 0:25. Horned Frogs 47–0. Drive: 14 plays, 50 yards, 4:47.

Fourth quarter

- TCU – Jaden Oberkrom 41-yard field goal, 11:31. Horned Frogs 50–0. Drive: 7 plays, 42 yards, 3:15.
- TEX – Joe Lorenzo 21-yard pass from Tyrone Swoopes (Nick Rose kick), 5:14. Horned Frogs 50–7. Drive: 4 plays, 93 yards, 1:26.

Statistics	TEX	TCU
First downs	20	31
Total yards	313	604
Rushing yards	191	228
Passing yards	122	376
Turnovers	1	0
Time of possession	29:26	30:34

Team	Category	Player	Statistics
Texas	Passing	Tyrone Swoopes	5/8, 74 yards, TD
Texas	Rushing	D'Onta Foreman	18 rushes, 112 yards
Texas	Receiving	John Burt	2 receptions, 36 yards
TCU	Passing	Trevone Boykin	20/35, 332 yards, 5 TD
TCU	Rushing	Aaron Green	14 rushes, 70 yards
TCU	Receiving	KaVontae Turpin	6 receptions, 138 yards, 4 TD

The Horned Frogs celebrated Homecoming during the October 3, 2015, Big 12 home opener versus Texas. The 50–7 win was the Horned Frogs' first home win over the Longhorns since 1992, and TCU's wins over the Longhorns in 2014 and 2015 mark the Frogs' first back-to-back wins over Texas since the 1950s. Trevone Boykin threw for 332 yards without playing in the fourth quarter. The third of his five touchdown passes broke the career touchdown pass record set by former TCU and current Cincinnati Bengals quarterback Andy Dalton from 2007–2010. Josh Doctson caught two touchdown passes, the latter of which broke former TCU wide receiver and former New England Patriot and Super Bowl Champion Josh Boyce's TCU career record.

=== At Kansas State ===
No. 2 TCU Horned Frogs at Kansas State Wildcats – Game Summary

Quarter	1	2	3	4	Total
No. 2 Horned Frogs	14	3	14	21	52
Wildcats	7	28	0	10	45

at Bill Snyder Family Football Stadium • Manhattan, Kansas

- Date: October 10
- Game time: 6:30 p.m. CDT
- Game weather: Clear, 76 °F (24 °C), wind S 14 mph (23 km/h)
- Game attendance: 53,671
- Referee: Reggie Smith
- TV announcers (Fox): Gus Johnson (play-by-play), Joel Klatt (color), Molly McGrath (sideline)
- Sources: TCU Game Notes, GoFrogs.com

Game information

First Quarter

- 14:42 – TCU – Aaron Green 86-yd run (Jaden Oberkrom, kick), TCU 7 – K-State 0
- 09:39 – K-State – Joe Hubener 2-yd run (Jack Cantele, kick), TCU 7 – K-State 7
- 07:46 – TCU – Josh Doctson 32-yd pass from Trevone Boykin (Jaden Oberkrom, kick), TCU 14 – K-State 7

Second Quarter

- 12:51 – K-State – Joe Hubener 17-yd run (Jack Cantele, kick), TCU 14 – K-State 14
- 11:32 – TCU – Jaden Oberkrom 50-yd field goal, TCU 17 – K-State 14
- 06:56 – K-State – Charles Jones 28-yd run (Jack Cantele, kick), TCU 17 – K-State 21
- 04:56 – K-State – Charles Jones 7-yd run (Jack Cantele, kick), TCU 17 – K-State 28
- 00:22 – K-State – Joe Hubener 1-yd run (Jack Cantele, kick), TCU 17 – K-State 35

Third Quarter

- 13:16 – TCU – Derrick Kindred 60-yd interception return (Jaden Oberkom, kick), TCU 24 – K-State 35
- 07:14 – TCU – Aaron Green 8-yd run (Jaden Oberkrom, kick), TCU 31 – K-State 35

Fourth Quarter

- 12:21 – K-State – Joe Hubener 1-yd run (Jack Cantele, kick), TCU 31 – K-State 42
- 07:55 – TCU – Trevone Boykin 14-yd run (Trevone Boykin pass failed), TCU 37 – K-State 42
- 06:07 – TCU – Trevone Boykin 69-yd run (Josh Doctson pass from Trevone Boykin), TCU 45 – K-State 42
- 01:47 – K-State – Jack Cantele 37-yd field goal, TCU 45 – K-State 45
- 01:10 – TCU – Josh Doctson 55-yd pass from Trevone Boykin (Jaden Oberkrom, kick), TCU 52 – K-State 45

Statistics	TCU	KSU
First downs	22	28
Total yards	543	385
Rushing yards	242	228
Passing yards	301	157
Turnovers	2	2
Time of possession	20:15	39:45

Team	Category	Player	Statistics
TCU	Passing	Trevone Boykin	20/30, 301 yards, 2 TD, 2 INT
TCU	Rushing	Trevone Boykin	11 rushes, 124 yards, 2 TD
TCU	Receiving	Josh Doctson	8 receptions, 155 yards, 2 TD
Kansas State	Passing	Joe Hubener	13/33, 157 yards, INT
Kansas State	Rushing	Joe Hubener	26 rushes, 111 yards, 4 TD
Kansas State	Receiving	Deante Burton	5 receptions, 65 yards

As the winner of the 2015 TCU–Kansas State football game, TCU took the lead in the all-time series against the Wildcats, with an overall record of 5–4. The Horned Frogs' come-from-behind win marked Gary Patterson's first win as a head coach against his alma mater in Manhattan. Jaden Oberkrom tied the all-time TCU career field goal record with a 50-yd field goal in the first half. The win marked the Frogs' 14th in a row, tying the all-time TCU record for consecutive wins. TCU's 52 points notched a school-record 5-game-50+ point streak. With the win, the Horned Frogs are now 25–1 when ranked in the top 5 and 36–3 when ranked in the top 10 under coach Patterson.

=== At Iowa State ===
No. 3 TCU Horned Frogs at Iowa State Cyclones – Game Summary

Quarter	1	2	3	4	Total
No. 3 Horned Frogs	14	10	7	14	45
Cyclones	21	0	0	0	21

at Jack Trice Stadium • Ames, Iowa

- Date: October 17
- Game time: 6:00 p.m. CDT
- Game weather: Clear, 54 °F (12 °C), wind S 0–5 mph (0.0–8.0 km/h)
- Game attendance: 52,480
- Referee: Mike Defee
- TV announcers (ESPN2): Beth Mowins (play-by-play), Anthony Becht (color), Paul Carcaterra (sideline)
- Sources: TCU Game Notes, GoFrogs.com

Game information

First Quarter

- 11:08 – ISU – Joshua Thomas 2-yd run (Cole Netten, kick), TCU 0 – ISU 7
- 10:13 – TCU – Josh Doctson 20-yd pass from Trevone Boykin (Jaden Oberkrom, kick), TCU 7 – ISU 7
- 06:38 – TCU – Kolby Listenbee 21-yd pass from Trevone Boykin (Jaden Oberkrom, kick), TCU 14 – ISU 7
- 06:01 – ISU – Allen Lazard 74-yd pass from Joel Lanning (Cole Netten, kick), TCU 14 – ISU 14
- 01:49 – ISU – Mike Warren 4-yd run (Cole Netten, kick), TCU 14 – ISU 21

Second Quarter

- 14:55 – TCU – Charlie Reid 14-yd pass from Trevone Boykin (Jaden Oberkrom, kick), TCU 21 – ISU 21
- 00:02 – TCU – Jaden Oberkrom 21-yd field goal, TCU 24 – ISU 21

Third Quarter

- 11:24 – TCU – Kyle Hicks 13-yd run (Jaden Oberkrom, kick), TCU 31 – ISU 21

Fourth Quarter

- 14:36 – TCU – Trevone Boykin 3-yd run (Jaden Oberkrom, kick), TCU 38 – ISU 21
- 08:45 – TCU – Josh Doctson 42-yd pass from Trevone Boykin (Jaden Oberkrom, kick), TCU 45 – ISU 21

Statistics	TCU	ISU
First downs	30	24
Total yards	621	461
Rushing yards	177	115
Passing yards	444	346
Turnovers	1	2
Time of possession	28:42	31:18

Team	Category	Player	Statistics
TCU	Passing	Trevone Boykin	27/32, 436 yards, 4 TD
TCU	Rushing	Trevone Boykin	13 rushes, 74 yards, TD
TCU	Receiving	Josh Doctson	10 receptions, 190 yards, 2 TD
Iowa State	Passing	Sam B. Richardson	22/36, 251 yards
Iowa State	Rushing	Mike Warren	22 rushes, 78 yards, TD
Iowa State	Receiving	Allen Lazard	5 receptions, 147 yards, TD

The Frogs remained perfect, extending the 2015 record to 7–0 and setting a new school record with a 15-game winning streak (dating back to 2014). TCU's top Heisman Trophy candidate, quarterback Trevone Boykin, accounted for 510 yards and 5 touchdowns. After a back-and-forth start, the Horned Frogs defense held the Cyclones scoreless through the second, third and fourth quarters. The Frogs' win marked the nation's-best fourth road victory over a Power 5 Conference foe. After the game, the Frogs entered their sole mid-season bye week sitting at first place in the Big 12 Conference standings.

=== West Virginia ===
West Virginia Mountaineers at No. 5 TCU Horned Frogs – Game Summary

Quarter	1	2	3	4	Total
Mountaineers	0	10	0	0	10
No. 5 Horned Frogs	17	6	14	3	40

at Amon G. Carter Stadium • Fort Worth, Texas

- Date: October 29
- Game time: 6:30 p.m. CDT
- Game weather: Sunny and clear, 75 °F (24 °C), wind S 10 mph (16 km/h)
- Game attendance: 45,947
- Referee: C. Castleberry
- TV announcers (FS1): Gus Johnson (play-by-play), Joel Klatt (color), Molly McGrath (sideline)
- Sources: TCU Game Notes, GoFrogs.com

Game information

First Quarter

- 08:46 – TCU – Josh Doctson 17-yd pass from Trevone Boykin (Jaden Oberkom, kick), WVU 0 – TCU 7
- 04:49 – TCU – Trevone Boykin 2-yd run (Jaden Oberkrom, kick), WVU 0 – TCU 14
- 01:01 – TCU – Jaden Oberkrom 20-yd field goal, WVU 0 – TCU 17

Second Quarter

- 11:19 – WVU – Shelton Gibson 32-yd pass from Skyler Howard (Josh Lambert, kick), WVU 7 – TCU 17
- 05:02 – WVU – Josh Lambert 51-yd field goal, WVU 10 – TCU 17
- 01:05 – TCU – Jaden Oberkrom 23-yd field goal, WVU 10 – TCU 20
- 00:00 – TCU – Jaden Oberkrom 57-yd field goal, WVU 10 – TCU 23

Third Quarter

- 12:43 – TCU – Kyle Hicks 7-yd pass from Trevone Boykin (Jaden Oberkrom, kick), WVU 10 – TCU 30
- 09:25 – TCU – Josh Doctson 9-yd pass from Trevone Boykin (Jaden Oberkrom, kick), WVU 10 – TCU 37

Fourth Quarter

- 14:05 – TCU – Jaden Oberkrom 43-yd field goal, WVU 10 – TCU 40

Statistics	WVU	TCU
First downs	21	35
Total yards	327	616
Rushing yards	167	227
Passing yards	160	389
Turnovers	1	0
Time of possession	23:39	36:21

Team	Category	Player	Statistics
West Virginia	Passing	Skyler Howard	16/39, 160 yards, TD, INT
West Virginia	Rushing	Wendell Smallwood	20 rushes, 113 yards
West Virginia	Receiving	David Sills	3 receptions, 42 yards
TCU	Passing	Trevone Boykin	33/48, 389 yards, 3 TD
TCU	Rushing	Trevone Boykin	11 rushes, 84 yards, TD
TCU	Receiving	Josh Doctson	12 receptions, 184 yards, 2 TD

TCU hosted WVU on a Thursday night in Fort Worth following the Frogs' only mid-season bye week. The Frogs' 30-point win marked the first time in four Big 12 meetings that the winner of the TCU–WVU game was not decided on the final play. Jaden Oberkrom's 57-yard field goal at the end of the first half tied a TCU record. Trevone Boykin's 472 yards of offense brought his career total to 12,041 yards, enough to pass Andy Dalton's career record of 11,925 yards and become the most in TCU history. Josh Doctson broke the TCU record for receptions in a season with his 67th grab in only the Frogs' eighth game of 2015. He also joined Michael Crabtree as the only FBS wide receivers in the past 20 seasons with 6-straight games of 100 receiving yards and 2 touchdowns. After an impressive run by Trevone Boykin, Dana Holgorsen offered Trevone Boykin a high-five on the WVU sideline.

=== At No. 14 Oklahoma State ===
No. 8 TCU Horned Frogs at No. 14 Oklahoma State Cowboys – Game Summary

Quarter	1	2	3	4	Total
No. 8 Horned Frogs	9	0	7	13	29
No. 14 Cowboys	14	14	14	7	49

at Boone Pickens Stadium • Stillwater, Oklahoma

- Date: November 7
- Game time: 2:30 p.m. CST
- Game weather: Sunny, 66 °F (19 °C), wind ENE 5 mph (8.0 km/h)
- Game attendance: 59,061
- Referee: Brad Van Vark
- TV announcers (Fox): Gus Johnson (play-by-play), Joel Klatt (color), Molly McGrath (sideline)
- Sources: TCU Game Notes, GoFrogs.com

Game information

First Quarter

- 11:05 – OSU – James Washington 48-yd pass from Mason Rudolph (Ben Grogan, kick), TCU 0 – OSU 7
- 06:28 – TCU – Trevone Boykin 1-yd run (Jaden Oberkrom, kick blocked), TCU 6 – OSU 7
- 06:02 – OSU – James Washington 50-yd pass from Mason Rudolph (Ben Grogan, kick), TCU 6 – OSU 14
- 03:24 – TCU – Jaden Oberkrom 23-yd field goal, TCU 9 – OSU 14

Second Quarter

- 13:37 – OSU – Jeff Carr 12-yd pass from Mason Rudolph (Ben Grogan, kick), TCU 9 – OSU 21
- 07:57 – OSU – Marcell Ateman 82-yd pass from Mason Rudolph (Ben Grogan, kick), TCU 9 – OSU 28

Third Quarter

- 12:08 – OSU – J. W. Walsh 1-yd run (Ben Grogan, kick), TCU 9 – OSU 35
- 08:56 – TCU – Trevone Boykin 1-yd run (Jaden Oberkrom, kick), TCU 16 – OSU 35
- 08:07 – OSU – James Washington 74-yd pass from Mason Rudolph (Ben Grogan, kick), TCU 16 – OSU 42

Fourth Quarter

- 14:19 – TCU – Kolby Listenbee 32-yd pass from Trevone Boykin (Jaden Oberkrom, kick), TCU 23 – OSU 42
- 02:28 – TCU – Aaron Green 1-yd run (Trevone Boykin, pass failed), TCU 29 – OSU 42
- 00:44 – OSU – Chad Whitener 42-yd interception return (Ben Grogan, kick), TCU 29 – OSU 49

Statistics	TCU	OKST
First downs	36	16
Total yards	663	456
Rushing yards	218	81
Passing yards	445	375
Turnovers	4	0
Time of possession	37:06	22:54

Team	Category	Player	Statistics
TCU	Passing	Trevone Boykin	35/57, 445 yards, TD, 4 INT
TCU	Rushing	Aaron Green	24 rushes, 97 yards, TD
TCU	Receiving	Shaun Nixon	9 receptions, 146 yards
Oklahoma State	Passing	Mason Rudolph	16/24, 352 yards, 5 TD
Oklahoma State	Rushing	Raymond Taylor	9 rushes, 28 yards
Oklahoma State	Receiving	James Washington	5 receptions, 184 yards, 3 TD

The Horned Frogs 16-game winning streak (dating back to October 2014) and undefeated season came to an end in Stillwater, Oklahoma. Heisman Trophy hopeful Trevone Boykin committed five turnovers, including four interceptions, as the TCU offense struggled to keep pace with the Cowboys' offense, which struck deep for four touchdown passes of 48 yards or more. Leading TCU receiver Josh Doctson exited the game early with a wrist injury that took away the Horned Frogs' most dangerous deep threat.

=== Kansas ===
Kansas Jayhawks at No. 15 TCU Horned Frogs – Game Summary

Quarter	1	2	3	4	Total
Jayhawks	3	7	0	7	17
No. 15 Horned Frogs	10	0	3	10	23

at Amon G. Carter Stadium • Fort Worth, Texas

- Date: November 14
- Game time: 11:00 a.m. CST
- Game weather: Overcast, 61 °F (16 °C), wind SE 10 mph (16 km/h)
- Game attendance: 44,375
- Referee: Eddy Shelton
- TV announcers (FS1): Joe Davis (play-by-play), Brady Quinn (color), Kris Budden (sideline)
- Sources: TCU Game Notes, GoFrogs.com

Game information
First quarter
- TCU – KaVontae Turpin 49-yard punt return (Jaden Oberkrom kick), 9:45. Horned Frogs 7–0.
- TCU – Jaden Oberkrom 42-yard field goal, 5:05. Horned Frogs 10–0. Drive: 10 plays, 55 yards, 2:36.
- KU – Matthew Wyman 42-yard field goal, 2:34. Horned Frogs 10–3. Drive: 8 plays, 67 yards, 2:31.

Second quarter

- KU – Taylor Cox 3-yard run (Matthew Wyman kick), 11:29. Tied 10–10. Drive: 10 plays, 70 yards, 3:31.

Third quarter

- TCU – Jaden Oberkrom 38-yard field goal, 5:01. Horned Frogs 13–10. Drive: 9 plays, 54 yards, 2:23.

Fourth quarter

- TCU – Shaun Nixon 42-yard pass from Foster Sawyer (Jaden Oberkrom kick), 11:51. Horned Frogs 20–10. Drive: 3 plays, 58 yards, 0:56.
- TCU – Jaden Oberkrom 36-yard field goal, 9:51. Horned Frogs 23–10. Drive: 5 plays, 51 yards, 1:32.
- KU – Tyler Patrick 10-yard pass from Ryan Willis (Matthew Wyman kick), 6:19. Horned Frogs 23–17. Drive: 10 plays, 77 yards, 3:32.

Statistics	KU	TCU
First downs	13	25
Total yards	324	487
Rushing yards	121	279
Passing yards	203	208
Turnovers	1	1
Time of possession	26:11	33:49

Team	Category	Player	Statistics
Kansas	Passing	Ryan Willis	20/41, 203 yards, TD, INT
Kansas	Rushing	Ke'aun Kinner	17 rushes, 80 yards
Kansas	Receiving	Steven Sims	6 receptions, 55 yards
TCU	Passing	Bram Kohlhausen	13/19, 112 yards, INT
TCU	Rushing	Aaron Green	30 rushes, 177 yards
TCU	Receiving	Shaun Nixon	7 receptions, 78 yards, TD

TCU improved to 9–1 (6–1) on the season and remained perfect against the Jayhawks since joining the Big 12 Conference, but Heisman-contending quarterback Trevone Boykin left the game with an ankle injury in the first quarter and did not return. The win extended the Horned Frogs' home winning streak to 12 games.

=== At No. 7 Oklahoma ===
No. 18 TCU Horned Frogs at No. 7 Oklahoma Sooners – Game Summary

Quarter	1	2	3	4	Total
No. 18 Horned Frogs	7	0	6	16	29
No. 7 Sooners	7	16	7	0	30

at Gaylord Family Oklahoma Memorial Stadium • Norman, Oklahoma

- Date: November 21
- Game time: 7:00 p.m. CST
- Game weather: Clear, 36 °F (2 °C), wind N 8 mph (13 km/h)
- Game attendance: 85,821
- Referee: Alan Eck
- TV announcers (ABC): Brad Nessler (play-by-play), Todd Blackledge (color), Holly Rowe (sideline)
- Sources: TCU Game Notes, GoFrogs.com

Game information

First Quarter

- 09:34 – TCU – Kolby Listenbee 37-yd pass from Foster Sawyer (Jaden Oberkrom, kick), TCU 7 – OU 0
- 00:22 – OU – Sterling Shepard 21-yd pass from Baker Mayfield (Austin Seibert, kick), TCU 7 – OU 7

Second Quarter

- 11:16 – OU – Austin Seibert 35-yd field goal, TCU 7 – OU 10
- 06:12 – OU – Austin Seibert 32-yd field goal, TCU 7 – OU 13
- 05:06 – OU – Dede Westbrook 36-yd pass from Baker Mayfield (Austin Seibert, kick), TCU 7 – OU 20
- 00:00 – OU – Austin Seibert 37-yd field goal, TCU 7 – OU 23

Third Quarter

- 12:43 – TCU – Aaron Green 26-yd run (Foster Sawyer pass failed), TCU 13 – OU 23
- 07:55 – OU – Samaje Perine 72-yd run (Austin Seibert, kick), TCU 13 – OU 30

Fourth Quarter

- 08:59 – TCU – KaVontae Turpin 86-yd pass from Bram Kohlhausen (Jaden Oberkrom, kick), TCU 20 – OU 30
- 06:27 – TCU – Jaden Oberkrom 43-yd field goal, TCU 23 – OU 30
- 00:51 – TCU – Emanuel Porter 14-yd pass from Bram Kohlhausen (Bram Kohlhausen pass failed), TCU 29 – OU 30

Statistics	TCU	OKLA
First downs	16	28
Total yards	390	536
Rushing yards	161	333
Passing yards	229	203
Turnovers	4	1
Time of possession	23:23	36:37

Team	Category	Player	Statistics
TCU	Passing	Bram Kohlhausen	5/11, 122 yards, 2 TD
TCU	Rushing	Aaron Green	23 rushes, 126 yards, TD
TCU	Receiving	Kolby Listenbee	4 receptions, 98 yards, TD
Oklahoma	Passing	Baker Mayfield	9/20, 127 yards, 2 TD
Oklahoma	Rushing	Samaje Perine	26 rushes, 188 yards, TD
Oklahoma	Receiving	Sterling Shepard	8 receptions, 111 yards, TD

The top-20 matchup between two 9–1 teams came ten years after the shocking TCU win in Norman that propelled the rise of the Horned Frogs on the national stage. TCU played without its starting quarterback and preseason Heisman Trophy favorite Trevone Boykin after he suffered an ankle injury early in the Frogs' game against Kansas on November 14. Leading wide receiver Josh Doctson, who received Heisman Trophy consideration midseason, was also out due to a wrist injury suffered at Oklahoma State on November 7. Including these two injuries, which topped pre-game headlines, the injury-plagued Horned Frogs squad was without its starting quarterback, 4 of their 6 top wide receivers, 2 of their 6 top offensive linemen, one starting defensive end, two starting linebackers, their starting free safety, one starting cornerback, and their starting long snapper. Additional early-season losses had also depleted the Frogs' depth. The Horned Frogs stormed back in the fourth quarter but failed to convert a would-be-winning-2-point try with less than a minute remaining.

=== No. 7 Baylor ===
No. 7 Baylor Bears at No. 19 TCU Horned Frogs – Game Summary

Quarter	1	2	3	4	OT	2OT	Total
No. 7 Bears	14	0	0	0	7	0	21
No. 19 Horned Frogs	7	7	0	0	7	7	28

at Amon G. Carter Stadium • Fort Worth, Texas

- Date: November 27
- Game time: 6:30 p.m. CST
- Game weather: Steady rain, 38 °F (3 °C), wind N 17 mph (27 km/h)
- Game attendance: 47,675
- Referee: Mike Defee
- TV announcers (ESPN): Dave Pasch (play-by-play), Brian Griese (color), Tom Luginbill (sideline)
- Sources: TCU Game Notes and GoFrogs.com

Game information
First quarter
- BAY – Devin Chafin 1-yard run (Chris Callahan kick), 10:40. Bears 7–0. Drive: 11 plays, 61 yards, 4:20.
- TCU – Jarrison Stewart 25-yard pass from Trevone Boykin (Jaden Oberkrom kick), 8:55. Tied 7–7. Drive: 4 plays, 63 yards, 1:45.
- BAY – Devin Chafin 5-yard run (Chris Callahan kick), 7:28. Bears 14–7. Drive: 7 plays, 75 yards, 1:27.

Second quarter

- TCU – Josh Carraway 56-yard fumble return (Jaden Oberkrom kick), 12:55. Tied 14–14.

Third quarter

- No scoring plays

Fourth quarter

- No scoring plays

Overtime

- BAY – Devin Chafin 4-yard pass from Chris Johnson (Chris Callahan kick). Bears 21–14. Drive: 8 plays, 25 yards.
- TCU – Trevone Boykin 1-yard run (Jaden Oberkrom kick). Tied 21–21. Drive: 4 plays, 25 yards.

Second overtime

- TCU – KaVontae Turpin 8-yard pass from Trevone Boykin (Jaden Oberkrom kick). Horned Frogs 28–21. Drive: 5 plays, 25 yards.

Statistics	BAY	TCU
First downs	21	15
Total yards	335	302
Rushing yards	273	154
Passing yards	62	148
Turnovers	5	2
Time of possession	27:51	32:09

Team	Category	Player	Statistics
Baylor	Passing	Chris Johnson	7/24, 62 yards, TD, INT
Baylor	Rushing	Devin Chafin	26 rushes, 119 yards, 2 TD
Baylor	Receiving	K. D. Cannon	3 receptions, 28 yards
TCU	Passing	Trevone Boykin	18/33, 148 yards, 2 TD, INT
TCU	Rushing	Aaron Green	17 rushes, 72 yards
TCU	Receiving	Emanuel Porter	3 receptions, 48 yards

The Horned Frogs closed their regular season with a two-overtime victory of the Baylor Bears, evening the most-played series in both programs' history at 52–52–7. Appropriately, the first meeting in the series' long history, in 1899, ended in a 0–0 tie, and by the time the Horned Frogs joined the Big 12 in 2012, the series was tied at 50–50–7. The matchup between the two defending Big 12 co-champions was highly anticipated since Baylor stunned the Frogs with a 21-point, fourth-quarter comeback in 2014.

=== Vs. No. 15 Oregon (Alamo Bowl) ===
2016 Alamo Bowl
No. 15 Oregon Ducks vs. No. 11 TCU Horned Frogs – Game Summary

Quarter	1	2	3	4	OT	2OT	3OT	Total
No. 15 Ducks	21	10	0	0	7	3	0	41
No. 11 Horned Frogs	0	0	17	14	7	3	6	47

at Alamodome • San Antonio, Texas

- Date: January 2, 2016
- Game time: 5:45 p.m. CST
- Game weather: None (played indoors)
- Game attendance: 64,569
- Referee: Marc Curles
- TV announcers (ESPN): Dave Flemming (play-by-play), Mack Brown (color), Alison Williams (sideline)
- Sources: TCU Game Notes and GoFrogs.com

Game information
First quarter
- ORE – Darren Carrington 37-yard pass from Vernon Adams (Aidan Schneider kick), 9:29. Ducks 7–0. Drive: 8 plays, 81 yards, 2:32.
- ORE – Royce Freeman 4-yard run (Aidan Schneider kick), 5:12. Ducks 14–0. Drive: 8 plays, 79 yards, 2:19.
- ORE – Royce Freeman 5-yard run (Aidan Schneider kick), 0:27. Ducks 21–0. Drive: 7 plays, 84 yards, 1:54.

Second quarter

- ORE – Tony Brooks-James 5-yard run (Aidan Schneider kick), 13:30. Ducks 28–0. Drive: 3 plays, 62 yards, 0:43.
- ORE – Aidan Schneider 47-yard field goal, 0:32. Ducks 31–0. Drive: 9 plays, 37 yards, 2:47.

Third quarter

- TCU – Jaden Oberkrom 24-yard field goal, 10:52. Ducks 31–3. Drive: 10 plays, 69 yards, 4:08.
- TCU – Jaelan Austin 26-yard pass from Bram Kohlhausen (Jaden Oberkrom kick), 4:18. Ducks 31–10. Drive: 11 plays, 64 yards, 4:47.
- TCU – Bram Kohlhausen 2-yard run (Jaden Oberkrom kick), 0:36. Ducks 31–17. Drive: 7 plays, 16 yards, 3:42.

Fourth quarter

- TCU – Jaden Oberkrom 34-yard field goal, 7:45. Ducks 31–20. Drive: 11 plays, 76 yards, 4:13.
- TCU – Aaron Green 2-yard run (Shaun Nixon pass to Buck Jones), 3:32. Ducks 31–28. Drive: 7 plays, 91 yards, 3:08.
- TCU – Jaden Oberkrom 22-yard field goal, 0:19. Tied 31–31. Drive: 8 plays, 31 yards, 1:58.

Overtime

- TCU – Emanuel Porter 7-yard pass from Bram Kohlhausen (Jaden Oberkrom kick). Horned Frogs 38–31. Drive: 4 plays, 25 yards.
- ORE – Royce Freeman 1-yard run (Aidan Schneider kick). Tied 38–38. Drive: 6 plays, 25 yards.

Second overtime

- ORE – Aidan Schneider 44-yard field goal. Ducks 41–38. Drive: 4 plays, -2 yards.
- TCU – Jaden Oberkrom 46-yard field goal. Tied 41–41. Drive: 5 plays, -3 yards.

Third overtime

- TCU – Bram Kohlhausen 8-yard run (pass failed). Horned Frogs 47–41. Drive: 3 plays, 25 yards.

Statistics	ORE	TCU
First downs	21	27
Total yards	419	545
Rushing yards	186	174
Passing yards	233	371
Turnovers	1	1
Time of possession	24:18	35:42

Team	Category	Player	Statistics
Oregon	Passing	Vernon Adams	13/19, 197 yards, TD
Oregon	Rushing	Royce Freeman	26 rushes, 130 yards, 3 TD
Oregon	Receiving	Darren Carrington	7 receptions, 107 yards, TD
TCU	Passing	Bram Kohlhausen	28/45, 351 yards, 2 TD, INT
TCU	Rushing	Aaron Green	25 rushes, 101 yards, TD
TCU	Receiving	Shaun Nixon	9 receptions, 71 yards

The Horned Frogs' closed the 2015 season with a 47–41 3OT victory in the Alamo Bowl. After Trevone Boykin was suspended from the game following his involvement in a bar fight, the Horned Frogs turned to walk-on backup quarterback Bram Kohlhausen, a fifth year senior who made his first and only start at TCU quarterback. After falling behind 0–31 at halftime, the Frogs roared back to tie the game at the end of regulation and win the game in the third overtime period. Kohlhausen was named the Alamo Bowl Offensive MVP and Travin Howard was named the Alamo Bowl defensive MVP.

== Personnel ==
=== Roster ===
2015 TCU Horned Frogs football team roster
Players
Coaches
Offense

Pos.	#	Name	Class
WR	1	Emanuel Porter	So
QB	2	Trevone Boykin	Sr
RB	3	Shaun Nixon	Fr
QB	6	Bram Kohlhausen	Sr
QB	7	Kenny Hill (injured)	Jr
WR	7	Kolby Listenbee	Sr
WR	9	Josh Doctson (injured)	Sr
WR	10	Desmon White	So
QB	11	Zach Allen	So
QB	12	Foster Sawyer	Fr
WR	13	Ty Slanina (injured)	Jr
WR	14	Jarrison Stewart	Fr
WR	15	Jaelan Austin	Fr
QB	17	Grayson Muehlstein	Fr
WR	19	Travis Hanes	So
WR	20	Deanté Gray (injured)	Sr
RB	21	Kyle Hicks	So
RB	22	Aaron Green	Sr
FB	23	Ryan Watkins	Jr
RB	24	Trevorris Johnson	So
WR	25	KaVontae Turpin	Fr
WR	28	Isaiah Alexander	So
WR	28	Tony James	Fr
WR	28	Patrick Zeller	Fr
RB	29	Colten Christensen	Sr
WR	30	Rocket Jr. Ismail	Fr
WR	34	Preston Miller	Jr
WR	34	Daniel Walsh	Jr
WR	38	Connor Osborne	Jr
RB	39	Stacy Boyd	Jr
WR	39	Justus Canfield	So
WR	43	Michael Carroll	Fr
WR	47	Jake Whittenburg	Fr
C	51	Austin Schlottmann	So
OT	52	Trey Elliott	Fr
C	53	Garrett Altman	So
C	55	Joey Hunt (injured)	Sr
G	58	Patrick Morris	So
OL	60	Thomas Walsh	Fr
G	61	Michael MacCrory	Jr
OT	62	David Bolisomi	Fr
OT	64	Matt Pryor	So
G	65	Brady Foltz	Sr
OT	68	Joseph Noteboom	So
OT	69	Aviante Collins	Sr
G	70	Cordel Iwuagwu	Fr
G	72	Bobby Thompson	Sr
C	73	Jozie Milton	Fr
OT	74	Halapoulivaati Vaitai	Sr
OT	75	Ryan Griswold	Fr
OT	76	Sam Awolope	Fr
G	77	Jamelle Naff (injured)	Sr
OL	78	Ty Barrett	Fr
OT	79	Luke Benuska	Sr
TE	80	Buck Jones	Jr
WR	81	Ja'Juan Story (injured)	Sr
WR	82	Charlie Reid	So
WR	83	Keaton Duhon	Fr
TE	84	Dominic Merka	Sr
WR	85	Corey McBride	Fr
TE	86	Bryson Burtnett	So
WR	87	TraVontae Hights	Fr
WR	88	Nathan Hernandez	Jr
TE	88	Cole Novak	So
WR	89	Andre Petties-Wilson	Fr

Defense

Pos.	#	Name	Class
CB	2	Corry O'Meally	Sr
CB	3	Torrance Mosley (injured)	So
S	4	Niko Small	Fr
S	6	Kenny Iloka (injured)	Sr
S	7	Arico Evans	Fr
CB	11	Ranthony Texada (injured)	So
CB	14	Jeff Gladney	Fr
S	15	Steve Wesley	So
S	16	Michael Downing Jr.	So
CB	17	DeShawn Raymond	Fr
S	18	Nick Orr	So
CB	19	Cyd Calvin	So
LB	20	Montrel Wilson	Fr
LB	23	Alec Dunham	Fr
CB	24	Julius Lewis	Fr
S	26	Derrick Kindred	Sr
S	30	Denzel Johnson	Jr
S	31	Ridwan Issahaku	Fr
CB	31	Devin Killpatrick	Sr
LB	32	Travin Howard	So
CB	33	Robert Lewis	Sr
CB	33	Ricky Musgrove	Fr
LB	35	Sammy Douglas (injured)	Jr
DE	40	James McFarland (injured)	Sr
LB	42	Ty Summers	Fr
LB	43	Davis Devereaux	Fr
LB	44	Paul Whitmill	So
DE	47	Tipa Galeai	Fr
LB	49	Garrett Kaufman	So
LB	49	Semaj Thomas	Fr
LB	50	Harrison Gillaspy	So
LB	53	George Cullen	So
DT	54	Joseph Broadnax	Fr
DT	57	Davion Pierson	Sr
DL	66	Pakamiaiaea Davis	Fr
DE	90	Terrell Lathan	Sr
DE	91	L. J. Collier	Fr
DE	92	Bryson Henderson	So
DE	93	Michael Morsharrafa	Jr
DE	93	Mike Tuaua	Sr
DE	94	Josh Carraway	Jr
DT	95	Aaron Curry (injured)	Jr
DE	96	Breylin Mitchell	Fr
DT	97	Chris Bradley	So
DT	98	Casey McDermott Vai	Sr
DT	99	Tevin Lawson (injured)	Jr

Special teams

Pos.	#	Name	Class
P	29	Adam Nunez	Fr
PK	33	Jaden Oberkrom	Sr
P	36	Ryan Graf	Fr
P	37	Ethan Perry	Sr
PK	46	Jonathan Song	Fr
PK	49	Brandon Hatfield	So
LS	67	Cole Graham	Fr
LS	71	Matt Boggs (injured)	So

Head coach

- Gary Patterson (Head Coach, 15th year)

Coordinators/assistant coaches

- DeMontie Cross (Co-defensive coordinator/LBs, 3rd year)
- Sonny Cumbie (Co-offensive coordinator/QBs, 2nd year)
- Chad Glasgow (Co-defensive coordinator/safeties, 14th year)
- Doug Meacham (Co-offensive coordinator/inside WRs, 2nd year)
- Jarrett Anderson (Offensive line coach, 18th year)
- Rusty Burns (Outside receivers coach, 7th year)
- Paul Gonzales (Cornerbacks coach, 1st year)
- Curtis Luper (Running backs coach, 3rd Year)
- Dan Sharp (Defensive line coach, 24th year)
- Eric Russell (Director of player personnel–special teams, 1st year)
- Don Sommer (Head strength & conditioning coach, 14th year)
- Matt Parker (Associate strength & conditioning coach, 9th year)
- Zarnell Fitch (Director of high school relations, 1st year)
- Hudson Fuller (Offensive analyst, 1st year)
- Jeremy Modkins (Defensive analyst, 1st year)
- Jake Brown (Graduate Assistant–Offense, 1st year)
- Clifton Odom (Graduate Assistant–Defense, 1st year)
- Bryson Oliver (Graduate Assistant–Offense, 2nd year)
- Jason Phillips (Graduate Assistant–Defense, 1st year)
- David Gable (Assoc. Director–Sports Medicine, 12th year)
- Matt Lewis (Director–Football Operations, 12th year)
- Nelly Gonzalez (Asst. Director–Football Operations, 1st year)

Legend

- (C) Team captain
- (S) Suspended
- (I) Ineligible
- Injured
- Redshirt

Roster
Last update: October 6, 2015

=== Returning starters ===
TCU anticipated the return of the below-listed starters (10 offensive starters, 5 defensive starters, and 2 players on special teams). Preseason and early-season injuries plagued the Horned Frogs, rendering several of the returners unavailable for all or part of the 2015 season, including Deante' Gray (season), Kolby Listenbee (several weeks), Ty Slanina (early, season-ending injury), James McFarland (season), Terrell Lathan (several weeks), Davion Pierson (several weeks), and Ranthony Texada (early, season-ending injury). Additionally, week 1 starting linebacker Mike Freeze left the team for personal reasons, and starting linebacker Sammy Dougals and starting safety Kenny Iloka suffered early season-ending injuries.

==== Offense ====
Player	Class	Position
Josh Doctson	Senior	WR
Deanté Gray	Senior	WR
Kolby Listenbee	Senior	WR
Ty Slanina	Junior	WR
Trevone Boykin	Senior	QB
Aaron Green	Senior	TB
Joey Hunt	Senior	C
Brady Foltz	Senior	OG
Jamelle Naff	Senior	OG
Halapoulivaati Vaitai	Senior	OT
Reference: TCU Spring Prospectus

==== Defense ====
Player	Class	Position
Derrick Kindred	Senior	S
Terrell Lathan	Senior	DE
James McFarland	Senior	DE
Davion Pierson	Senior	DT
Ranthony Texada	Sophomore	CB
Reference: TCU Spring Prospectus

==== Special teams ====
Player	Class	Position
Jaden Oberkrom	Senior	PK
Ethan Perry	Senior	P
Reference: TCU Spring Prospectus

=== Depth chart ===
As released October 12, 2015, prior to the Frogs' week 7 game at Iowa State:

==== Offense ====
Pos.	No.	Name	Ht.	Wt.	Cl.
LT	74; 69	Halapoulivaati Vaitai; Aviante Collins	6–6; 6–6	315; 295	Sr. Sr.
LG	77; 72	Jamelle Naff; Bobby Thompson	6–4; 6–6	325; 310	Sr. Sr.
C	55; 51	Joey Hunt; Austin Schlottmann	6–3; 6–6	295; 300	Sr. Sr.
RG	65; 58	Brady Foltz; Patrick Morris	6–4; 6–3	320; 288	Sr. So.
RT	68; 64	Joseph Noteboom; Matt Pryor	6–5; 6–7	320; 350	So. So.
TE	80; 84	Buck Jones; Dominic Merka	6–4; 6–4	255; 250	Jr. Sr.
RB	22; 21; 24; 3	Aaron Green OR; Kyle Hicks OR; Trevorris Johnson OR; Shaun Nixon	5–11; 5–10; 5–11; 5–10	205; 200; 221; 196	Sr. So. So. RFr.
QB	2; 6; 12	Trevone Boykin; Bram Kohlhausen; Foster Sawyer	6–2; 6–2; 6–5	205; 203; 228	Sr. Sr. RFr.
WR (X)	7; 28	Kolby Listenbee; Tony James	6–1; 5–10	183; 156	Sr. Fr.
WR (H)	10; 25	Desmon White; KaVontae Turpin	5–7; 5–9	150; 152	So. Fr.
WR (Y)	3; 14	Shaun Nixon; Jarrison Stewart	5–10; 6–0	196; 190	RFr. Fr.
WR (Z)	9; 81; 15	Josh Doctson; Ja'Juan Story; Jaelan Austin	6–3; 6–4; 6–0	195; 208; 192	Sr. Sr. Fr.

==== Defense ====
Pos.	No.	Name	Ht.	Wt.	Cl.
LE	94; 92; 47; 96	Josh Carraway; Bryson Henderson; Tipa Galeai; Breylin Mitchell	6–4; 6–6; 6–5; 6–4	250; 275; 220; 255	Jr. So. Fr. Fr.
DT	97; 99	Chris Bradley; Tevin Lawson	6–2; 6–4	255; 280	So. Jr.
DT	57; 95	Davion Pierson; Aaron Curry	6–2; 6–2	305; 280	Sr. Jr.
RE	93; 90	Mike Tuaua; Terrell Lathan	6–3; 6–5	253; 280	Sr. Sr.
MLB	42; 32	Ty Summers; Travin Howard	6–2; 6–1	230; 190	RFr. So.
SLB	20; 23	Montrel Wilson; Alec Dunham	6–3; 6–1	208; 213	Fr. Fr.
SS	30; 7	Denzel Johnson; Arico Eans	6–2; 6–2	205; 196	Jr. Fr.
FS	26; 4	Derrick Kindred; Niko Small	5–10; 6–10	210; 187	Sr. Fr.
WS	31; 16	Ridwan Issahaku; Michael Downing	6–1; 5–11	180; 175	RFr. So.
CB	2; 17; 3	Corey O'Meally; DeShawn Raymond; Torrance Mosley	6–0; 6–1; 5–10	170; 180; 160	Sr. Fr. So.
CB	18; 24	Nick Orr; Julius Lewis	5–10; 5–10	166; 170	So. Fr.

==== Special teams ====
Pos.	No.	Name	Ht.	Wt.	Cl.
PK	33	Jaden Oberkrom	6–3	187	Sr.
LSN	71	Matt Boggs	6–0	205	So.
SSN	88	Bryson Burtnett	6–5	248	So.
H	11	Zach Allen	6–3	210	So.
KO	33; 46	Jaden Oberkrom; Jonathan Song	6–3; 5–10	187; 170	Sr. Fr.
P	37; 46	Ethan Perry; Jonathan Song	6–4; 5–10	230; 170	Sr. Fr.
KR	25; 3	KaVontae Turpin; Shaun Nixon	5–9; 5–10	152; 198	Fr. RFr.
PR	25; 10	KaVontae Turpin; Desmon White	5–9; 5–7	152; 150	Fr. So.

== Awards and honors ==
=== Preseason awards ===
Gary Patterson: CBS Sports Preseason Coach of the Year; Trevone Boykin: CBS Sports Preseason Player of the Year; CBS Sports Preseason First Team All-American; ESPN Preseason All-American; Sports Illustrated Preseason All-American; Big 12 Preseason Offensive Player of the Year; Preseason All-Big 12	Josh Doctson: Preseason All-Big 12; Joey Hunt: Preseason All-Big 12; Davion Pierson: Preseason All-Big 12; Halapoulivaati Vaitai: Preseason All-Big 12

=== Weekly awards ===
Gary Patterson: Dodd Trophy Coach of the Week (vs. Baylor, week 13); Trevone Boykin: Big 12 Co-offensive Player of the Week (vs. SMU, week 3); Earl Campbell Tyler Rose Award – Week 3 Honorable Mention (vs. SMU, week 3); FWAA National Offensive Player of the Week (at Texas Tech, week 4); Earl Campbell Tyler Rose Award – Week 4 Honorable Mention (at Texas Tech, week 4); Paul Hornung Award Weekly Honor Roll (at Texas Tech, week 4); Manning Award Star of the Week (at Texas Tech, week 4); Davey O'Brien Quarterback of the Week (at Texas Tech, week 4); Earl Campbell Tyler Rose Award – Week 5 Honorable Mention (vs. Texas, week 5); Manning Award Star of the Week (vs. Texas, week 5); Davey O'Brien "Great 8" Performance (vs. Texas, week 5); CBS Sports National Player of the Week (at Kansas State, week 6); Big 12 Offensive Player of the Week (at Kansas State, week 6); Earl Campbell Tyler Rose Award Week 6 National Player of the Week (at Kansas State, week 6); Manning Award Star of the Week (at Kansas State, week 6); Davey O'Brien "Great 8" Performance (at Kansas State, week 6); Earl Campbell Tyler Rose Award – Week 7 Honorable Mention (at Iowa State, week 7); Davey O'Brien "Great 8" Performance (at Iowa State, week 7); Earl Campbell Tyler Rose Award – Week 9 Honorable Mention (vs. West Virginia, week 9); Manning Award Star of the Week (vs. West Virginia, week 9); Davey O'Brien Quarterback of the Week (vs. West Virginia, week 9)	Josh Doctson: Earl Campbell Tyler Rose Award – Week 3 Honorable Mention (vs. SMU, week 3); Walter Camp National Player of the Week (at Texas Tech, week 4); CBS Sports National Player of the Week (at Texas Tech, week 4); Big 12 Offensive Player of the Week (at Texas Tech, week 4); Earl Campbell Tyler Rose Award National Player of the Week (at Texas Tech, week 4); Earl Campbell Tyler Rose Award – Week 6 Honorable Mention (at Kansas State, week 6); Earl Campbell Tyler Rose Award – Week 7 Honorable Mention (at Iowa State, week 7); Earl Campbell Tyler Rose Award – Week 9 Honorable Mention (vs. West Virginia, week 9); Jaden Oberkrom: Lou Groza Award Star of the Week (at Minnesota, week 1); Lou Groza Award Star of the Week (vs. Kansas, week 11); Ty Summers: Big 12 Defensive Player of the Week (vs. Baylor, week 13); Walter Camp National Player of the Week (vs. Baylor, week 13); KaVontae Turpin: Big 12 Co-offensive Player of the Week (vs. Texas, week 5); Paul Hornung Award Weekly Honor Roll (vs. Texas, week 5); Earl Campbell Tyler Rose Award – Week 5 Honorable Mention (vs. Texas, week 5); Paul Hornung Award Weekly Honor Roll (at Oklahoma State, week 10)

=== Midseason awards ===
Trevone Boykin: CBS Sports Midseason All-American; ESPN Midseason All-American; FOX Sports Midseason All-American; Sports Illustrated Midseason All-American; USA Today Midseason All-American	Josh Doctson: CBS Sports Midseason All-American; ESPN Midseason All-American; FOX Sports Midseason All-American; Sports Illustrated Midseason All-American; USA Today Midseason All-American

=== Award watch lists ===
Gary Patterson: Paul 'Bear' Bryant Coach of the Year Watch List; Bobby Dodd Coach of the Year Watch List; Trevone Boykin: Walter Camp Player of the Year Watch List; Manning Award Watch List; Maxwell Award Watch List; Davey O'Brien Award Watch List; Johnny Unitas Golden Arm Award Watch List; Earl Campbell Tyler Rose Award Watch List; Josh Doctson: Biletnikoff Award Watch List; Maxwell Award Watch List; Earl Campbell Tyler Rose Award Watch List	Aaron Green: Maxwell Award Watch List; Doak Walker Award Candidate; Earl Campbell Tyler Rose Award Watch List; Joey Hunt: Outland Trophy Watch List; Rimington Trophy Watch List; Rotary Lombardi Award Watch List; AFCA Good Works Team Nominee; Wuerffel Trophy Watch List; Derrick Kindred: Chuck Bednarik Award Watch List; Lott IMPACT Trophy Watch List	Jaden Oberkrom: Lou Grouza Award Watch List; Davion Pierson: Chuck Bednarik Award Watch List; Outland Trophy Watch List; Rotary Lombardi Award Watch List; Mike Tuaua: Polynesian College Football Player of the Year Watch List; Halapoulivaati Vaitai: Outland Trophy Watch List; Rotary Lombardi Award Watch List; Polynesian College Football Player of the Year Watch List

=== Award semifinalists ===
Trevone Boykin

- Walter Camp Player of the Year Semifinalist
- Earl Campbell Tyler Rose Award Semifinalist
- Maxwell Award Semifinalist
- Davey O'Brien Award Semifinalist
- Johnny Unitas Golden Arm Award Top 15

Josh Doctson

- Biletnikoff Award Semifinalist
- Walter Camp Player of the Year Semifinalist
- Earl Campbell Tyler Rose Award Semifinalist
- Maxwell Award Semifinalist

Aaron Green

- Earl Campbell Tyler Rose Award Semifinalist

Jaden Oberkrom

- William V. Campbell Trophy Semifinalist
- Lou Groza Award Semifinalist

=== Award finalists ===
Trevone Boykin: Manning Award Finalist; Earl Campbell Tyler Rose Award Finalist; Davey O'Brien Award Finalist; Johnny Unitas Golden Arm Award Finalist	Josh Doctson: Biletnikoff Award Finalist; Earl Campbell Tyler Rose Award Finalist

=== Postseason awards ===
Gary Patterson: Honorable Mention Big 12 Coach of the Year; Trevone Boykin: Walter Camp Second Team All-American; Second Team All-Big 12; Honorable Mention Big 12 Offensive Player of the Year; Josh Carraway: First Team All-Big 12; Josh Doctson: Unanimous First Team All-American; AFCA First Team All-American; AP First Team All-American; CBS Sports First Team All-American; FWAA First Team All-American; Sporting News First Team All-American; Sports Illustrated First Team All-American; USA Today First Team All-American; Walter Camp First Team All-American; First Team All-Big 12; ESPN.com All-Big 12	Aaron Green: Honorable Mention All-Big 12; Travin Howard: Honorable Mention All-Big 12; Joey Hunt: First Team All-Big 12; Denzel Johnson: Honorable Mention All-Big 12; Derrick Kindred: First Team All-Big 12; ESPN.com All-Big 12; Kolby Listenbee: Honorable Mention All-Big 12; Jaden Oberkrom: FWAA Second Team All-American; Second Team All-Big 12; Honorable Mention Big 12 Special Teams Player of the Year; ESPN.com All-Big 12	Davion Pierson: First Team All-Big 12; Ty Summers: Honorable Mention Big 12 Defensive Freshman of the Year; Mike Tuaua: Honorable Mention All-Big 12; KaVontae Turpin: FWAA Freshman All-American; Honorable Mention Big 12 Offensive Freshman of the Year; Honorable Mention All-Big 12; ESPN.com All-Big 12; Halapoulivaati Vaitai: Second Team All-Big 12

=== Bowl awards ===
Josh Carraway: ESPN All-Big 12 Bowl Team; Aaron Green: ESPN All-Big 12 Bowl Team; Bram Kohlhausen: Alamo Bowl Offensive MVP; AP All-Bowl Team; ESPN All-Big 12 Bowl Team; Travin Howard: Alamo Bowl Defensive MVP	Denzel Johnson: ESPN All-Big 12 Bowl Team; Jaden Oberkrom: ESPN All-Big 12 Bowl Team; Davion Pierson: ESPN All-Big 12 Bowl Team; Austin Schlottmann: ESPN All-Big 12 Bowl Team; Ty Summers: ESPN All-Big 12 Bowl Team
