= Kolby Listenbee =

American football player (born 1994)

No. 18
- Position: Wide receiver

Personal information
- Born: January 25, 1994 (age 32); Arlington, Texas, U.S.
- Listed height: 6 ft 0 in (1.83 m)
- Listed weight: 183 lb (83 kg)

Career information
- High school: Bowie (Arlington)
- College: TCU (2012–2015)
- NFL draft: 2016: 6th round, 192nd overall pick

Career history
- Buffalo Bills (2016); Miami Dolphins (2017)*; Indianapolis Colts (2017–2018)*
- * Offseason or practice squad member only
- Stats at Pro Football Reference

Kolby Listenbee (born January 25, 1994) is an American former professional football wide receiver. He was selected by the Buffalo Bills in the sixth round of the 2016 NFL draft. He played college football at TCU.

== Early life ==
Listenbee attended Bowie High School in Arlington, Texas. He played quarterback for the Volunteers football team. He committed to Texas Christian University (TCU) to play college football.

== College career ==
Listenbee played in 16 games his first two years at TCU (2012–2013) and had three receptions for 82 yards. As a junior in 2014, he became a starter and had 41 receptions for 753 yards and four touchdowns. As a senior in 2015, he had 30 receptions for 597 yards and five touchdowns.

Listenbee was also an All-American sprinter for the TCU Horned Frogs track and field team, finishing 7th in the 100 meters at the 2015 NCAA Division I Outdoor Track and Field Championships.

== Professional career ==
=== Pre-draft ===
On December 1, 2015, it was announced that Listenbee had accepted an invitation to play in the 2016 Senior Bowl. On January 26, 2016, it was reported Listenbee would be unable to play in the Senior Bowl and he was replaced by Clemson's Charone Peake. Listenbee was one of 43 collegiate wide receivers invited to the NFL Scouting Combine in Indianapolis, Indiana. He performed the majority of drills, but was unable to perform the short shuttle or three-cone drill after suffering an apparent groin injury. His overall performance was well received by scouts and analysts, as Listenbee ran the second fastest 40-yard dash among all players, only behind Notre Dame wide receiver Will Fuller. On March 31, 2016, he attended TCU's pro day, along with Trevone Boykin, Josh Doctson, Derrick Kindred, Halapoulivaati Vaitai, Aaron Green, Jaden Oberkrom, and 13 others. Scouts and team representatives from 30 NFL teams attended, including Minnesota Vikings' head coach Mike Zimmer, Vikings' General Manager Rick Spielman, Los Angeles Rams' General Manager Les Snead, and wide receiver coaches from the Oakland Raiders and Dallas Cowboys. Listenbee only performed 18 reps in the bench press, due to a sports hernia injury. At the conclusion of the pre-draft process, Listenbee was projected to be a third- or fourth-round pick by NFL draft experts an scouts. He was ranked the 11th best wide receiver in the draft by NFLDraftScout.com.

Pre-draft measurables
Height	Weight	Arm length	Hand span	40-yard dash	10-yard split	20-yard split	Vertical jump	Broad jump	Bench press
6 ft 0 in (1.83 m)	197 lb (89 kg)	31 3/8 in (0.80 m)	8 1/4 in (0.21 m)	4.39 s	1.60 s	2.63 s	35 1/2 in (0.90 m)	10 ft 9 in (3.28 m)	15 reps
All values from NFL Combine

=== Buffalo Bills ===
The Buffalo Bills selected Listenbee in the sixth round (192nd overall) of the 2016 NFL draft. He was the 23rd wide receiver selected in 2016. On May 12, 2016, the Bills signed Listenbee to a four-year, $2.47 million contract with a signing bonus of $99,699.

Throughout training camp, Listenbee competed for a roster spot against Greg Salas, Marcus Easley, Dezmin Lewis, Leonard Hankerson, Greg Little, Jarrett Boykin, Walter Powell, Davonte Allen, and Gary Chambers. On August 30, 2016, Listenbee was placed on the reserve/non-football injury list coming off of surgery.

On June 6, 2017, Listenbee was waived by the Bills due to persistent injury concerns.

=== Miami Dolphins ===
On October 3, 2017, Listenbee was signed to the practice squad of the Miami Dolphins. He was released on December 5, 2017.

=== Indianapolis Colts ===
On December 13, 2017, Listenbee was signed to the Indianapolis Colts' practice squad. He signed a reserve/future contract with the Colts on January 1, 2018. He was waived/injured by the Colts on May 18, 2018, and was placed on injured reserve. He was released on June 7, 2018.
