= Zach Orr =

American football player and coach (born 1992)

Seattle Seahawks
- Title: Linebackers coach

Personal information
- Born: June 9, 1992 (age 34); Loudoun County, Virginia, U.S.
- Listed height: 6 ft 0 in (1.83 m)
- Listed weight: 225 lb (102 kg)

Career information
- Position: Linebacker (No. 54)
- High school: DeSoto (DeSoto, Texas)
- College: North Texas (2010–2013)
- NFL draft: 2014: undrafted

Career history

Playing
- Baltimore Ravens (2014–2016)

Coaching
- Baltimore Ravens (2017–2020) Defensive analyst; Jacksonville Jaguars (2021) Outside linebackers coach; Baltimore Ravens (2022–2023) Inside linebackers coach; Baltimore Ravens (2024–2025) Defensive coordinator; Seattle Seahawks (2026–present) Inside linebackers coach

Awards and highlights
- Second-team All-Pro (2016); First-team All-C-USA (2013); 2× Second-team All-Sun Belt (2011, 2012)

Career NFL statistics
- Total tackles: 162
- Sacks: 1.0
- Forced fumbles: 1
- Fumble recoveries: 2
- Interceptions: 3
- Stats at Pro Football Reference
- Coaching profile at Pro Football Reference

Zachary Orr (born June 9, 1992) is an American professional football coach and former linebacker who is currently the linebackers coach for the Seattle Seahawks of the National Football League (NFL). Previously, he served as the defensive coordinator for the Baltimore Ravens of the National Football League (NFL). Before that, he was an assistant coach for the Ravens from 2017–2020, outside linebackers coach for the Jacksonville Jaguars in 2021, and inside linebackers coach for the Ravens from 2022–2023.

Orr played college football at North Texas and signed with the Ravens as an undrafted free agent in 2014. He played for three seasons in the NFL.

== Playing career ==
Pre-draft measurables
Height	Weight	Arm length	Hand span	Wingspan	40-yard dash	10-yard split	20-yard split	20-yard shuttle	Three-cone drill	Vertical jump	Broad jump	Bench press
5 ft 11 7/8 in (1.83 m)	237 lb (108 kg)	31 3/4 in (0.81 m)	9 1/4 in (0.23 m)	6 ft 4 7/8 in (1.95 m)	4.73 s	1.70 s	2.76 s	4.41 s	7.26 s	33.0 in (0.84 m)	9 ft 8 in (2.95 m)	14 reps
All values from Pro Day

Orr was signed by the Baltimore Ravens as an undrafted free agent in 2014. He made the 53-man roster as an undrafted rookie and finished second on the team with 7 special teams tackles.

Orr began the 2016 season as the Ravens starting weak-side linebacker, and sealed a win over the Jacksonville Jaguars in Week 3 with an interception in the waning seconds. He started all 15 games he played in, recording 132 tackles, five passes defended, three interceptions, and a forced fumble. He was placed on injured reserve on December 30, 2016, prior to the season finale. He was named second-team All-Pro after the 2016 season.

Orr announced his retirement from the NFL on January 20, 2017 due to a congenital neck/spine condition that ended his season. On June 28, Orr announced on Good Morning Football that he would be coming out of retirement and return to football after receiving encouraging diagnoses about the congenital spinal condition. Orr was set to be a restricted free agent in 2017, but the Ravens never placed a tender on him because they assumed he would retire, making Orr an unrestricted free agent.

After visiting with six teams and talking with 11 others, no team would sign him due to his spinal condition and herniated disc. He officially announced his retirement for a second time on August 18, 2017.

== NFL career statistics ==
Legend
**Bold**	Career high

=== Regular season ===
Year	Team	Games		Tackles				Interceptions						Fumbles	
Year	Team	GP	GS	Cmb	Solo	Ast	Sck	PD	Int	Yds	Avg	Lng	TD	FF	FR
2014	BAL	15	0	8	6	2	0.0	0	0	0	0.0	0	0	0	0
2015	BAL	16	0	22	19	3	**1.0**	1	0	0	0.0	0	0	0	0
2016	BAL	15	15	**133**	**92**	**41**	0.0	**5**	**3**	**23**	**7.7**	**14**	0	0	**2**
Career		46	15	163	117	46	1.0	6	3	23	7.7	14	0	0	2

== Coaching career ==
=== Baltimore Ravens ===
On August 30, 2017, Orr began his coaching career and was hired by the Baltimore Ravens as a defensive analyst under head coach John Harbaugh. This came 12 days after announcing his second retirement.

=== Jacksonville Jaguars ===
On February 11, 2021, Orr was hired by the Jacksonville Jaguars as their outside linebackers coach under head coach Urban Meyer.

=== Baltimore Ravens (second stint) ===
On February 23, 2022, Orr was hired by the Ravens as their inside linebackers coach under head coach John Harbaugh.

On February 1, 2024, Orr was promoted to defensive coordinator for the Baltimore Ravens, replacing Mike Macdonald after his departure to become the head coach of the Seattle Seahawks.

=== Seattle Seahawks ===
On January 22, 2026, Jesse Minter was hired as the new Ravens head coach to replace the recently fired John Harbaugh, and Orr was not retained as the Ravens defensive coordinator. On February 13, 2026, Orr was hired by the Seahawks as their inside linebackers coach, reuniting with Macdonald.

== Personal life ==
Orr is the son of former Washington Redskins tight end Terry Orr. He has three brothers, all of whom have played college football: older brother Terrance, who played at Texas State, younger brother Nick, who played at TCU and youngest brother Chris, who played at Wisconsin and is now a coach after playing in the NFL and USFL.

Orr was born with a rare spinal condition where his C-1 vertebrae, the one located at the top of his neck below his skull, was not fully developed. It was revealed that if Orr took a bad hit, the C-1 could explode and may result in death. This promptly forced Orr to retire from professional football after his third season, coming off a breakout season where he led the Ravens in tackles and earned second-team All-Pro in 2016.
