= Zarnell Fitch =

American football player and coach (born 1983)

Current position
- Title: Defensive Line Coach
- Team: USC
- Conference: Big 10

Biographical details
- Born: July 6, 1983 (age 43); Spencer, Oklahoma
- Education: TCU

Playing career
- 2001–2002: Navarro JC
- 2004–2005: TCU
- 2006–2007*: New York Jets
- 2007: Frankfurt Galaxy
- 2007: Baltimore Ravens
- 2008*: Washington Redskins
- 2009: Green Bay Blizzard
- 2010: Milwaukee Iron
- Position: Defensive tackle

Coaching career (HC unless noted)
- 2003: Navarro JC (DL)
- 2006: TCU (GA)
- 2011–2012: Dallas Lincoln HS (Assistant)
- 2013: Dallas Lincoln HS
- 2014–2015: TCU (Director HS Relations)
- 2016–2021: TCU (DL)
- 2022–2025: Texas Tech (DL)

Zarnell Stephen Fitch (born July 6, 1983) is an American football coach and former player. He was signed by the New York Jets as an undrafted free agent in 2006, spent time with two other NFL teams and played in several other professional leagues. He was the Defensive Line Coach at Texas Tech Red Raiders football through January 31, 2026 but his contract was not extended.

== Early life ==
Fitch was born and raised by a single mother in Spencer, Oklahoma, a suburb of Oklahoma City. He graduated from Star Spencer High School in 2001.

== Playing career ==
=== College ===
The first two seasons of Fitch's college football career came at Navarro College in Corsicana, Texas, where he was a two-year starter playing defensive tackle for the Bulldogs. As a sophomore in 2002, he totalled 48 tackles, 2 sacks, a forced fumble and 2 fumble recoveries. He signed a national letter of intent to play at Tennessee in 2003, but returned to Navarro that fall to completed his junior college academic requirements while not participating in football.

Following his one-year hiatus from competitive football, Fitch enrolled at Texas Christian University in Fort Worth, Texas in January 2004. That fall, he played in eight games for the Horned Frogs, registering 10 tackles. In the first game of his senior season, Fitch registered a tackle for loss as TCU upset #5 Oklahoma, 17-10 in Norman. He went on to start three games that season, helping the Frogs win a conference title in their first year as members of the Mountain West Conference. He registered 24 tackles for the season to go along with 1.5 sacks and 2 interceptions - including one in a 27-24 victory over Iowa State in the 2005 Houston Bowl.

Fitch graduated from TCU in May 2006 with a degree in communication and a minor in social work.

=== Professional ===
After going undrafted in the 2006 NFL draft and sitting out the majority of that season, Fitch signed with the New York Jets in December and assigned to their practice squad. In the spring of 2007, the Jets assigned Fitch to the Frankfurt Galaxy of NFL Europa where he started five games and helped lead the Galaxy to a berth in World Bowl XV.

Following an appearance in one preseason game for the Jets in 2007, Fitch was waived on August 28. He then signed with the Baltimore Ravens, spending the majority of the 2007 season with their practice squad but also being promoted to the active roster for 4 games. He signed with the Washington Redskins on July 27, 2008, but was waived two days later.

Fitch spent the 2009 season with the Green Bay Blizzard of the now-defunct AF2, earning second-team All-AF2 honors He then spent the 2010 season with the Milwaukee Iron of the Arena Football League, registering one sack in 9 games.

== Coaching career ==
The seeds of Fitch's coaching career were sewn during his playing days, as his academic hiatus at Navarro JC in 2003 led to a battlefield promotion to serve as the Bulldogs' defensive line coach at age 19, and he served as a graduate assistant at TCU for part of the 2006 season prior to his signing with the Jets.

In 2011, Fitch became an assistant coach at Lincoln High School in Dallas. After two seasons, he was promoted to become the Tigers' head coach, leading them to a 7-4 record in 2013 that included a win over Dallas Carter in the Texas Class 4A State Playoffs.

Fitch returned to TCU in 2014, when his former coach Gary Patterson hired him to become the Director of High School Relations on his staff, a position that placed him at the center of the Frogs' recruiting operation. Two seasons later, Fitch was promoted to the on-field coaching staff as TCU's Defensive Line Coach.

Under Fitch's watch, five different TCU defensive linemen have earned 1st Team All-Big 12 honors:

- Josh Carraway (2016)
- Mat Boesen (2017)
- Ben Banogu (2017, 2018)
- L. J. Collier (2018)
- Ross Blacklock (2019)

Additionally, current Horned Frog defensive tackle Corey Bethley was named a Freshman All-American in 2017.
