= 2015 All-Big 12 Conference football team =

The 2015 All-Big 12 Conference football team consists of American football players chosen as All-Big 12 Conference players for the 2015 Big 12 Conference football season. The conference recognizes two official All-Big 12 selectors: (1) the Big 12 conference coaches selected separate offensive and defensive units and named first- and second-team players (the "Coaches" team); and (2) a panel of sports writers and broadcasters covering the Big 12 also selected offensive and defensive units and named first- and second-team players (the "Media" team).

== Offensive selections ==
=== Quarterbacks ===
- Baker Mayfield, Oklahoma (Coaches-1; Media-1)
- Trevone Boykin, TCU (Coaches-2; Media-2)

=== Running backs ===
- Samaje Perine, Oklahoma (Coaches-1; Media-1)
- DeAndré Washington, Texas Tech (Coaches-1; Media-1)
- Shock Linwood, Baylor (Coaches-2; Media-2)
- Wendell Smallwood, West Virginia (Coaches-2; Media-2)

=== Fullbacks ===
- Winston Dimel, Kansas State (Coaches-1)
- Alex De La Torre, Texas (Coaches-2)

=== Centers ===
- Joey Hunt, TCU (Coaches-1; Media-1)
- Ty Darlington, Oklahoma (Coaches-1; Media-2)
- Kyle Fuller, Baylor (Coaches-2; Media-2)
- Tyler Orlosky, West Virginia (Coaches-2)

=== Guards ===
- Nila Kasitati, Oklahoma (Coaches-1; Media-1)
- Cody Whitehair, Kansas State (Coaches-1; Media-2)
- Jarell Broxton, Baylor (Coaches-2; Media-1)
- Jamison Lalk, Iowa State (Coaches-2)
- Brady Foltz, TCU (Media-2)
- Alfredo Morales, Texas Tech (Media-2)

=== Tackles ===
- Le'Raven Clark, Texas Tech (Coaches-1; Media-1)
- Spencer Drango, Baylor (Coaches-1; Media-1)
- Halapoulivaati Vaitai, TCU (Coaches-2; Media-2)

=== Tight ends ===
- Mark Andrews, Oklahoma (Coaches-2; Media-1)
- Blake Jarwin, Oklahoma State (Coaches-1)
- Glenn Gronkowski, Kansas State (Media-2)

=== Receivers ===
- Corey Coleman, Baylor (Coaches-1; Media-1)
- Josh Doctson, TCU (Coaches-1; Media-1)
- Sterling Shepard, Oklahoma (Coaches-1; Media-2)
- James Washington, Oklahoma State (Coaches-2; Media-2)
- K. D. Cannon, Baylor (Coaches-2)
- Jakeem Grant, Texas Tech (Coaches-2)

== Defensive selections ==
=== Defensive linemen ===
- Emmanuel Ogbah, Oklahoma State (Coaches-1; Media-1)
- Charles Tapper, Oklahoma (Coaches-1; Media-1)
- Andrew Billings, Baylor (Coaches-1; Media-1)
- Josh Carraway, TCU (Coaches-1; Media-2)
- Will Geary, Kansas State (Media-1)
- Davion Pierson, TCU (Coaches-1)
- Noble Nwachukwu, West Virginia (Media-2)
- Kyle Rose, West Virginia (Media-2)
- Desmond Tucker, Iowa State (Media-2)
- Shawn Oakman, Baylor (Coaches-2)
- Dale Pierson, Iowa State (Coaches-2)
- Travis Britz, Kansas State (Coaches-2)
- Charles Walker, Oklahoma (Coaches-2)
- Jimmy Bean, Oklahoma State (Coaches-2)

=== Linebackers ===
- Jordan Burton, Oklahoma State (Media-1)
- Peter Jinkens, Texas (Media-1)
- Eric Striker, Oklahoma (Coaches-1; Media-1)
- Dominique Alexander, Oklahoma (Coaches-1; Media-2)
- Micah Awe, Texas Tech (Media-2)
- Nick Kwiatkoski, West Virginia (Coaches-1; Media-2)
- Peter Jinkens, Texas (Coaches-2)
- Elijah Lee, Kansas State (Coaches-2)
- Jordan Evans, Oklahoma (Coaches-2)

=== Defensive backs ===
- Xavien Howard, Baylor (Coaches-1; Media-1)
- Zack Sanchez, Oklahoma (Coaches-1; Media-1)
- Derrick Kindred, TCU (Coaches-1; Media-1)
- Kevin Peterson, Oklahoma State (Coaches-1)
- Jordan Sterns, Oklahoma State (Coaches-2; Media-1)
- Jordan Thomas, Oklahoma (Coaches-2; Media-2)
- Fish Smithson, Kansas (Coaches-2; Media-2)
- Daryl Worley, West Virginia (Media-2)
- Steven Parker, Oklahoma (Media-2)
- Ahmad Thomas, Oklahoma (Coaches-2)

== Special teams ==
=== Kickers ===
- Jaden Oberkrom, TCU (Media-1; Coaches-2)
- Jack Cantele, Kansas State (Coaches-1)
- Austin Seibert, Oklahoma (Media-2)

=== Punters ===
- Nick O'Toole, West Virginia (Coaches-1; Media-1)
- Austin Seibert, Oklahoma (Coaches-2; Media-2)

=== All-purpose / Return specialists ===
- Morgan Burns, Kansas State (Coaches-1; Media-2)
- Jakeem Grant, Texas Tech (Coaches-2; Media-1)

== Key ==
Bold = selected as a first-team player by both the coaches and media panel

Coaches = selected by Big 12 Conference coaches

Media = selected by a media panel

== See also ==
- 2015 College Football All-America Team
