= Terry Orr =

American football player (born 1961)

No. 87, 37, 89
- Position: Tight end

Personal information
- Born: September 27, 1961 (age 65); Savannah, Georgia, U.S.
- Listed height: 6 ft 3 in (1.91 m)
- Listed weight: 227 lb (103 kg)

Career information
- High school: Abilene (TX) Cooper
- College: Texas
- NFL draft: 1985: 10th round, 263rd overall pick

Career history
- Washington Redskins (1986–1990); San Diego Chargers (1990); Washington Redskins (1991–1993)

Awards and highlights
- 2× Super Bowl champion (XXII, XXVI)

Career NFL statistics
- Receptions: 52
- Receiving yards: 939
- Receiving touchdowns: 10
- Stats at Pro Football Reference

Terrance F. Orr (born September 27, 1961) is an American former professional football player who was a tight end in the National Football League (NFL) for the Washington Redskins and San Diego Chargers. He was selected by Washington in the tenth round of the 1985 NFL draft with the 263rd overall pick. He played high school football for Cooper High School in Abilene, Texas, and college football for the Texas Longhorns.

In August 2001, Orr was sentenced to fourteen months in prison for defrauding three former Redskins players (including Art Monk) and a Georgia businessman with a failed shoe company.

== Personal life ==
Orr has four sons, Terrance, Zach, Nick, and Chris. Terrance is currently the offensive coordinator for Hebron High School. Zach was the defensive coordinator for the Baltimore Ravens, Nick is currently a free agent, and Chris is currently the linebackers coach for the Tennessee State Tigers.
