= Nick Orr =

American football player (born 1995)

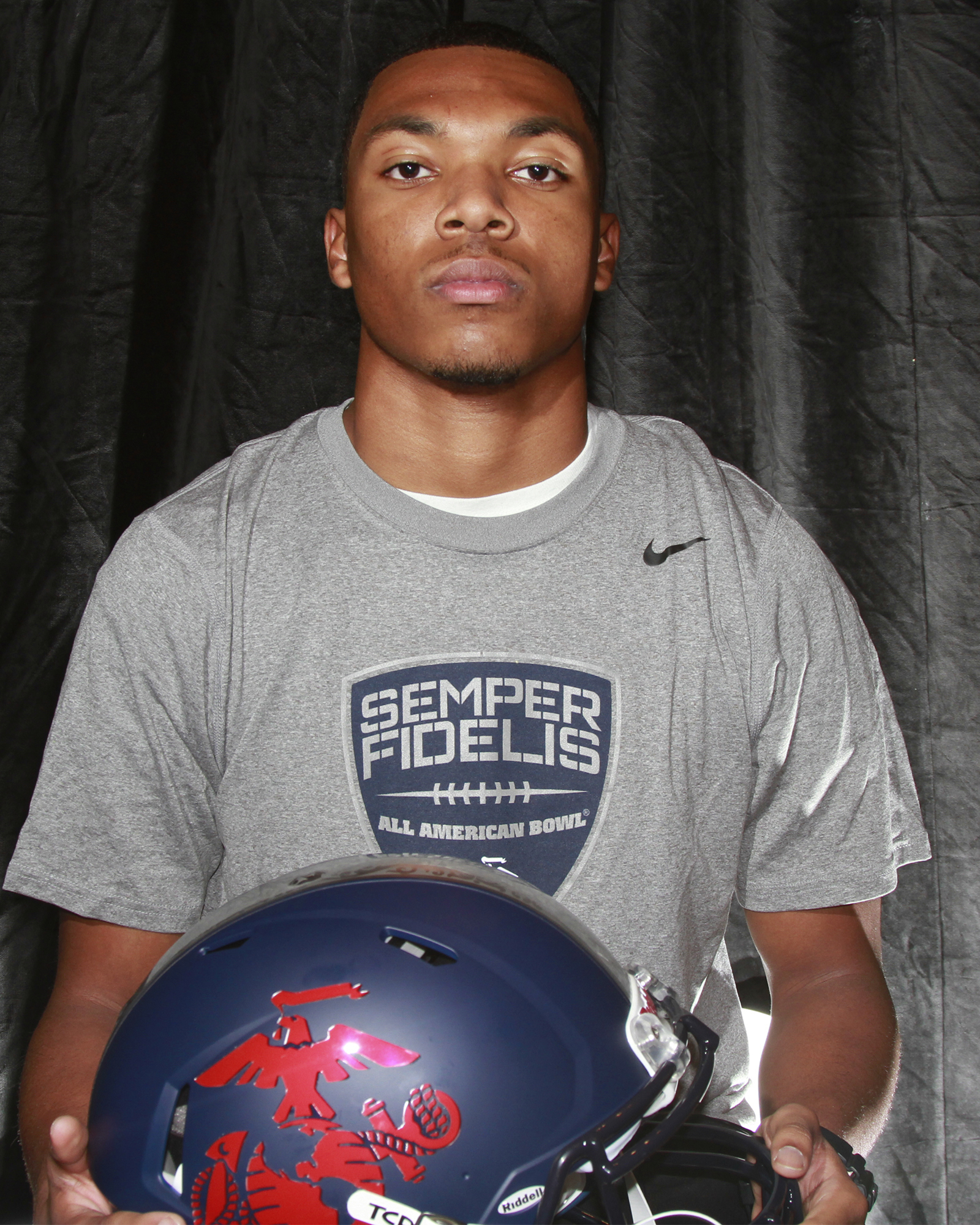
- Orr c. 2014

Profile
- Position: Safety

Personal information
- Born: October 6, 1995 (age 31)
- Listed height: 5 ft 11 in (1.80 m)
- Listed weight: 179 lb (81 kg)

Career information
- High school: DeSoto (TX)
- College: TCU
- NFL draft: 2018: undrafted

Career history
- Chicago Bears (2018)*; San Antonio Commanders (2019)
- * Offseason or practice squad member only

Awards and highlights
- First-team All-Big 12 (2017)

Nick Orr (born October 6, 1995) is an American former football safety. He was signed by the Chicago Bears as an undrafted free agent in 2018. He played college football at TCU.

== Early life ==
Orr grew up in DeSoto, Texas in very athletic family. His father, Terry Orr, played eight seasons in the NFL and won two Super Bowl rings with the Washington Redskins. His eldest brother, Terrance, played football at Texas State. Zach Orr, another older brother, played at North Texas before spending three seasons with the Baltimore Ravens. Nick's younger brother, Chris, played at Wisconsin and signed as an undrafted free agent with the Carolina Panthers on April 26, 2020.

At DeSoto High School, Orr was a four-year starter for the Eagles who was named Honorable Mention All-State his junior and senior seasons. He verbally committed to play at TCU in the summer before his senior season, and signed his national letter of intent with the Horned Frogs on February 5, 2014.

== College career ==
Orr recorded his first collegiate interception in his debut for TCU in a road game against SMU as true freshman in 2014, a season in which the Frogs would go on to win a Big 12 championship and rank third in the final polls after blowing out Ole Miss, 42-3, in the Peach Bowl. He started 39 games for the TCU in the next three seasons, ending his college career with 126 tackles, 1 sack, 9 interceptions and 3 fumble recoveries. He helped the Frogs win the Alamo Bowl twice and was named 2nd Team All-Big 12 as a junior in 2016 and 1st Team All-Big 12 as a senior in 2017.

== Professional career ==
Pre-draft measurables
Height	Weight	40-yard dash	10-yard split	20-yard split	20-yard shuttle	Three-cone drill	Vertical jump	Broad jump	Bench press
5 ft 11 in (1.80 m)	179 lb (81 kg)	4.57 s	1.55 s	2.53 s	4.21 s	6.93 s	33.5 in (0.85 m)	9 ft 2 in (2.79 m)	14 reps
All values are from Pro Day

=== Chicago Bears ===
After going undrafted in the 2018 NFL draft, Orr signed with the Chicago Bears on May 12, 2018 as an undrafted free agent. He played in all five of the Bears' preseason games, but was released by the Bears during final team cuts on September 1.

=== San Antonio Commanders ===
On December 7, 2018, Orr signed with the San Antonio Commanders of the new Alliance of American Football. He was waived on February 28, 2019.
