= Patrick Morris (American football) =

American football player (born 1995)

No. 50
- Position: Center

Personal information
- Born: February 13, 1995 (age 31); Denton, Texas, U.S.
- Listed height: 6 ft 3 in (1.91 m)
- Listed weight: 300 lb (136 kg)

Career information
- High school: Guyer (Denton)
- College: TCU
- NFL draft: 2018: undrafted

Career history
- Pittsburgh Steelers (2018–2019); Denver Broncos (2019–2020); Tennessee Titans (2021)*
- * Offseason or practice squad member only

Career NFL statistics
- Games played: 3
- Stats at Pro Football Reference

Patrick Morris (born February 13, 1995) is an American former professional football player who was a center in the National Football League (NFL). He played college football for the TCU Horned Frogs and was signed as an undrafted free agent by the Pittsburgh Steelers in 2018. He was also a member of the Denver Broncos and the Tennessee Titans.

== Professional career ==
Pre-draft measurables
Height	Weight	Arm length	Hand span	Wingspan	40-yard dash	10-yard split	20-yard split	20-yard shuttle	Three-cone drill	Vertical jump	Broad jump	Bench press
6 ft 2 3/8 in (1.89 m)	300 lb (136 kg)	31 1/4 in (0.79 m)	9 in (0.23 m)	6 ft 2 1/8 in (1.88 m)	5.09 s	1.80 s	2.89 s	4.41 s	7.34 s	35.5 in (0.90 m)	9 ft 9 in (2.97 m)	37 reps
All values from Pro Day

=== Pittsburgh Steelers ===
Morris signed with the Pittsburgh Steelers as an undrafted free agent on April 28, 2018. He was waived on September 1 and signed to the practice squad the next day. He signed a reserve/future contract on December 31.

On August 31, 2019, Morris was again waived by the Steelers and signed to the practice squad the next day. He was promoted to the active roster on November 21. He was waived on December 2.

=== Denver Broncos ===
On December 3, 2019, Morris was claimed off waivers by the Denver Broncos.

He was waived on September 5, 2020, and was signed to the practice squad the following day. He was elevated to the active roster on October 31 for the team's Week 8 game against the Los Angeles Chargers, and reverted to the practice squad after the game. He was placed on the practice squad/injured list on November 6 after suffering an arm injury against the Chargers.

He signed a reserve/future contract on January 5, 2021. On July 27, Morris was released by the Broncos.

=== Tennessee Titans ===
On July 30, 2021, Morris signed with the Tennessee Titans. He was waived on August 6.
