= Cordel Iwuagwu =

American football player (born 1996)

No. 70
- Position: Guard

Personal information
- Born: September 4, 1996 (age 30); Houston, Texas, U.S.
- Listed height: 6 ft 3 in (1.91 m)
- Listed weight: 313 lb (142 kg)

Career information
- High school: Westfield (Harris County, Texas)
- College: TCU
- NFL draft: 2020: undrafted

Career history
- Houston Texans (2020)*; Cleveland Browns (2020); Michigan Panthers (2022)
- * Offseason or practice squad member only
- Stats at Pro Football Reference

Cordel Iwuagwu (born September 4, 1996) is an American former professional football guard. He played college football at TCU. Iwuagwu now works as a highschool football coach and teaches social studies at Lake Creek High School.

== Early life ==
Iwuagwu attended Westfield High School, where he starred as an offensive guard on the Mustangs' football team. At Westfield, Iwuagwu earned First-team District 15-6A honors. Scout.com rated Iwuagwu as a three-star recruit, the No. 7 offensive guard in the State of Texas, and No. 60 offensive guard in the nation coming out of high school. Iwuagwu, ultimately, chose to attend and play football at TCU over scholarship offers from Arizona State University, University of Illinois, University of Louisville, and Syracuse University.

== College career ==
Iwuagwu redshirted his 2015 freshman season at TCU. In 2017, as a sophomore, Iwuagwu started all 14 games, lining up mostly at left guard. In 2019, after starting all 12 games as a senior, Iwuagwu earned Honorable Mention All-Big 12 Conference Team honors. Iwuagwu was selected to the West Team to play in the 2020 East-West Shrine Bowl.

== Professional career ==
After his successful college career, Iwuagwu was invited to and attended the 2020 NFL Combine.

=== Houston Texans ===
After going undrafted in the 2020 NFL draft, Iwuagwu signed with the Houston Texans as an undrafted free agent on April 27, 2020. He was waived during final roster cuts on September 5, 2020, and signed to their practice squad two days later. Iwuagwu was released on September 14, and re-signed to the practice squad the next day. He was released again on September 28, 2020.

=== Cleveland Browns ===
Iwuagwu was signed to the Cleveland Browns' practice squad on December 28, 2020. He was elevated to the active roster on January 2, 2021, for the team's week 17 matchup against the Pittsburgh Steelers, and reverted to the practice squad after the game.

Iwuagwu signed a reserve/futures contract with the Browns on January 18, 2021. Iwuagwu was waived by the Browns on August 16, 2021.
