= Deanté Gray =

American football player (born 1994)

Profile
- Position: Wide receiver

Personal information
- Born: February 27, 1994 (age 32); Houston, Texas, U.S.
- Listed height: 5 ft 10 in (1.78 m)
- Listed weight: 174 lb (79 kg)

Career information
- High school: Westside (TX)
- College: TCU
- NFL draft: 2017: undrafted

Career history
- Houston Texans (2017)
- Stats at Pro Football Reference

Deanté Gray (born February 27, 1994) is an American former football wide receiver. He played college football for the TCU Horned Frogs, and went undrafted in the 2017 NFL draft.

== College career ==
Gray had a breakout season in 2014 for the Horned Frogs after catching 36 passes for 582 yards and 8 touchdowns while averaging 16.2 yards a reception. He missed the 2015 with a medical redshirt due to a knee injury. With the Frogs struggling on defense in 2016, Gray was switched to defense for one game at cornerback but that was short-lived as he was switched back to offense. However, in his senior season, he had only 10 receptions for 119 yards and no touchdowns.

At TCU's Pro Day, Gray ran a 4.43 yard forty yard dash, benched 12 reps and had a vertical jump of 32.5 inches.

== Professional career ==
Gray signed with the Houston Texans as an undrafted free agent on May 12, 2017. On July 28, he tore his ACL during practice, prematurely ending his rookie season.

On March 26, 2018, Gray was waived by the Texans.
