= Matt Pryor (American football) =

American football player (born 1994)

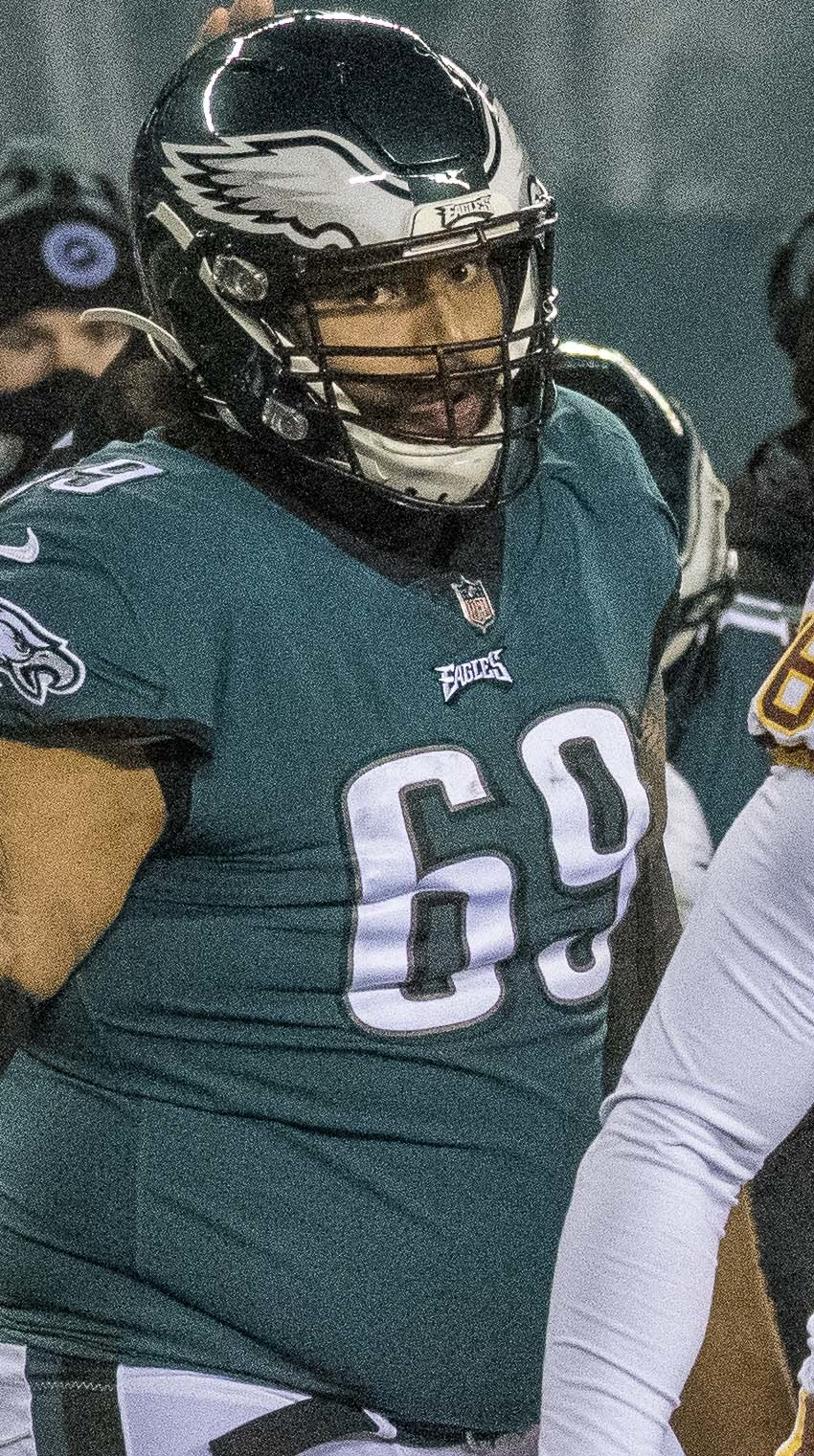
- Pryor with the Philadelphia Eagles in 2021

No. 65 – New England Patriots
- Position: Guard
- Roster status: Active

Personal information
- Born: December 16, 1994 (age 31); Long Beach, California, U.S.
- Listed height: 6 ft 7 in (2.01 m)
- Listed weight: 332 lb (151 kg)

Career information
- High school: Lakewood (Lakewood, California)
- College: TCU (2013–2017)
- NFL draft: 2018: 6th round, 206th overall pick

Career history
- Philadelphia Eagles (2018–2020); Indianapolis Colts (2021–2022); San Francisco 49ers (2023); Chicago Bears (2024); Philadelphia Eagles (2025); Arizona Cardinals (2026)*; New England Patriots (2026–present)
- * Offseason or practice squad member only

Awards and highlights
- Second-team All-Big 12 (2017)

Career NFL statistics as of 2025
- Games played: 109
- Games started: 40
- Stats at Pro Football Reference

Matt Pryor (born December 16, 1994) is an American professional football guard for the New England Patriots of the National Football League (NFL). He played college football for the TCU Horned Frogs.

== Early life ==
Pryor first played as a freshman member of the Pirates football team at San Pedro before transferring to Lakewood High School. He played tackle, defensive end and nose guard positions with the Lancers football team before graduating in 2013. He accepted a scholarship offer from Texas Christian University.

== College career ==
After his redshirt season in 2013, Pryor played 8 games as a redshirt freshman during the 2014 season. He went on to play 11 games during the 2015 season, including his first start at the Oklahoma State game. He started 5 of the last games of that season. During the 2016 season, Pryor played as a starting right guard in all 13 games. Pryor's senior season in 2017 saw him earn second-team All-Big 12 honors. During the 2017 season, Pryor and the Horned Frogs appeared in the NFLPA Collegiate Bowl. In his final season, Pryor served as team captain. He played 8 games as a starting right guard before finishing the remaining 6 games as a starting right tackle. While in college, Pryor worked as a bouncer from his sophomore year until senior graduation.

== Professional career ==
Pre-draft measurables
Height	Weight	Arm length	Hand span	Wingspan	40-yard dash	10-yard split	20-yard split	20-yard shuttle	Three-cone drill	Vertical jump	Broad jump	Bench press
6 ft 6 3/4 in (2.00 m)	328 lb (149 kg)	35 1/2 in (0.90 m)	11 1/2 in (0.29 m)	7 ft 2 5/8 in (2.20 m)	5.62 s	1.98 s	3.20 s	4.90 s	7.87 s	24.5 in (0.62 m)	8 ft 0 in (2.44 m)	23 reps
All values from TCU's Pro Day

=== Philadelphia Eagles ===
Pryor was selected by the Philadelphia Eagles in the sixth round (206th overall) of the 2018 NFL draft.

He made his first start at right guard in January 2020, during a playoff loss to the Seattle Seahawks. Pryor filled in for the injured Brandon Brooks.

Pryor was placed on the reserve/COVID-19 list by the team on October 16, 2020, and activated on October 22.

Once promoted to the active roster, Pryor started 10 of 15 games. He played in six games as a starting right guard. He later played three games as a starting right tackle before playing one game as a left guard.

=== Indianapolis Colts ===
On August 31, 2021, the Eagles traded Pryor and a 2022 seventh-round pick to the Indianapolis Colts for a 2022 sixth-round pick.

Pryor played in all 17 games of the 2021 season. During the season, he started five games, including three games as a right tackle, one game as a right guard and one game as a left tackle.

On March 16, 2022, Pryor signed a one-year contract extension worth $5.5 million with the Colts.

In sixteen games during the 2022 season, Pryor played four games as a starting left tackle, started one as a right tackle and four as a right guard.

=== San Francisco 49ers ===
On March 27, 2023, Pryor signed with the San Francisco 49ers. He played in 15 games during his single season with the team.

=== Chicago Bears ===
On March 13, 2024, Pryor signed a one-year contract with the Chicago Bears.

=== Philadelphia Eagles (second stint) ===
On March 27, 2025, Pryor signed a one-year contract with the Philadelphia Eagles.

=== Arizona Cardinals ===
On March 12, 2026, Pryor signed a one-year contract with the Arizona Cardinals. Pryor was released by the Cardinals as a part of final roster cuts on August 30; he was re-signed to the team's practice squad the following day.

=== New England Patriots ===
On October 1, 2026, Pryor was signed by the New England Patriots off the Cardinals practice squad.
