= Josh Doctson =

American football player (born 1992)

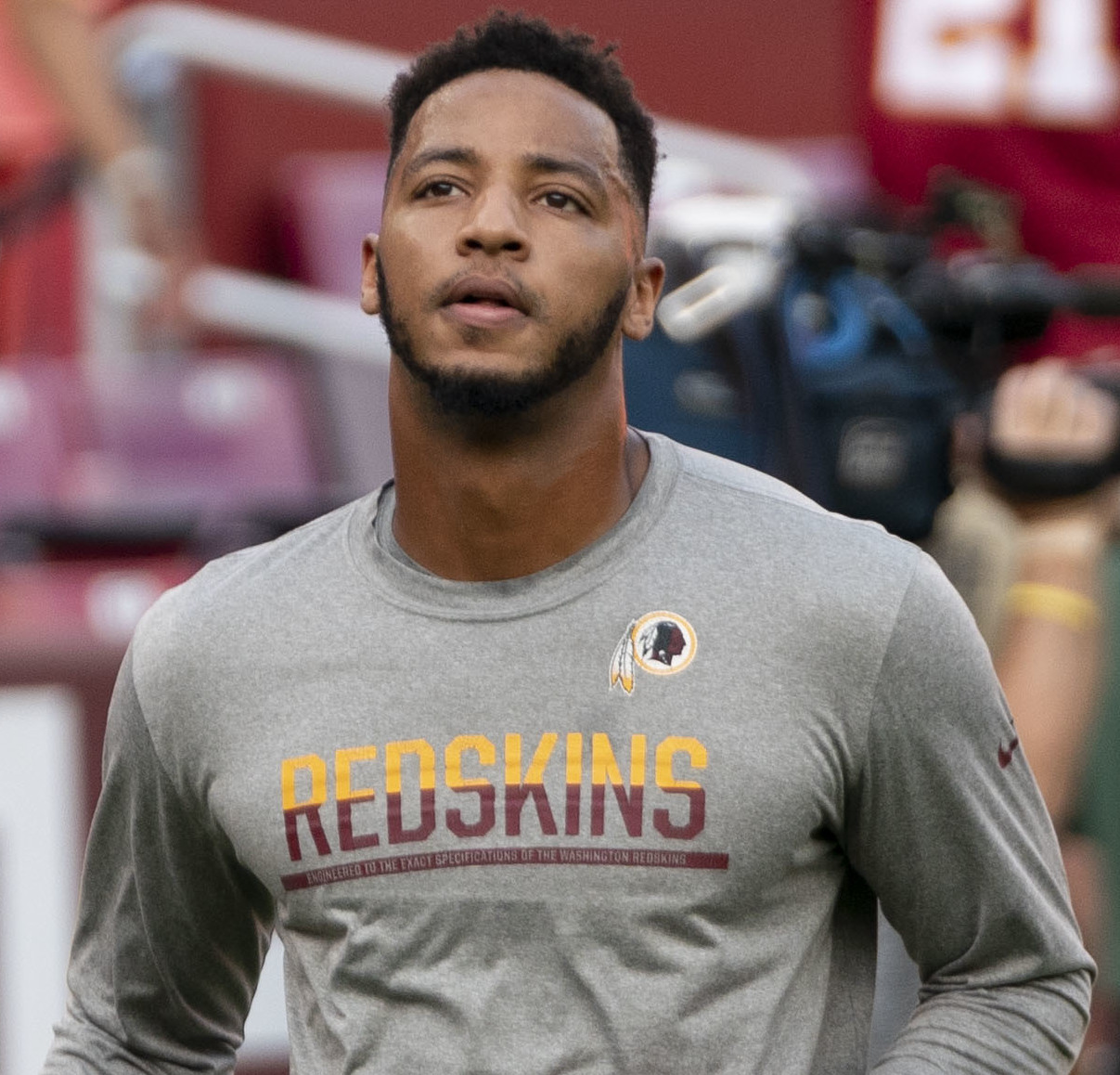
- Doctson with the Washington Redskins in 2018

No. 18, 13
- Position: Wide receiver

Personal information
- Born: December 3, 1992 (age 33); Mansfield, Texas, U.S.
- Listed height: 6 ft 2 in (1.88 m)
- Listed weight: 206 lb (93 kg)

Career information
- High school: Mansfield Legacy
- College: Wyoming (2011); TCU (2012–2015)
- NFL draft: 2016: 1st round, 22nd overall pick

Career history
- Washington Redskins (2016–2018); Minnesota Vikings (2019); New York Jets (2020); Arizona Cardinals (2021)*
- * Offseason or practice squad member only

Awards and highlights
- Unanimous All-American (2015); First-team All-Big 12 (2015); Second-team All-Big 12 (2014)

Career NFL statistics
- Receptions: 81
- Receiving yards: 1,100
- Receiving touchdowns: 8
- Stats at Pro Football Reference

Joshua Doctson (born December 3, 1992) is an American former professional football player who was a wide receiver in the National Football League (NFL). He played college football for the TCU Horned Frogs, earning unanimous All-American honors in 2015. Doctson was selected by the Washington Redskins in the first round of the 2016 NFL draft. He was also a member of the Minnesota Vikings, New York Jets, and Arizona Cardinals.

== Early life ==
Doctson attended Mansfield Legacy High School in Mansfield, Texas, where he was a three-year letterman in both football and basketball. In his first season of football as a junior, he saw action in six games and hauled in 18 passes for 220 yards with a long of 25. As a senior in 2010, he caught 35 passes for 558 yards and 5 touchdowns in nine games, earned first-team All-District 5-5A honors and was voted a team captain, as well as being selected Legacy's Most Valuable Player.

Doctson was rated by Rivals.com as a three-star recruit. He committed to the University of Wyoming to play college football on December 14, 2010, choosing the Cowboys over Duke and Tulsa.

== College career ==
Doctson had 35 receptions for 393 yards and five touchdowns in 12 games as a true freshman at Wyoming in 2011. After the season, he transferred to Texas Christian University (TCU). After sitting out 2012 due to NCAA transfer rules, Doctson played in 12 games with six starts in his first year at TCU in 2013. He had 36 receptions for 440 yards and four touchdowns that season. As a junior in 2014, Doctson had 65 receptions for school records of 1,018 yards and 11 touchdowns.

== Professional career ==
Pre-draft measurables
Height	Weight	Arm length	Hand span	Wingspan	40-yard dash	10-yard split	20-yard split	20-yard shuttle	Three-cone drill	Vertical jump	Broad jump	Bench press
6 ft 2 in (1.88 m)	202 lb (92 kg)	31 7/8 in (0.81 m)	9 7/8 in (0.25 m)	6 ft 4 5/8 in (1.95 m)	4.50 s	1.48 s	2.62 s	4.08 s	6.84 s	41.0 in (1.04 m)	10 ft 11 in (3.33 m)	14 reps
All values from NFL Combine

=== Washington Redskins ===
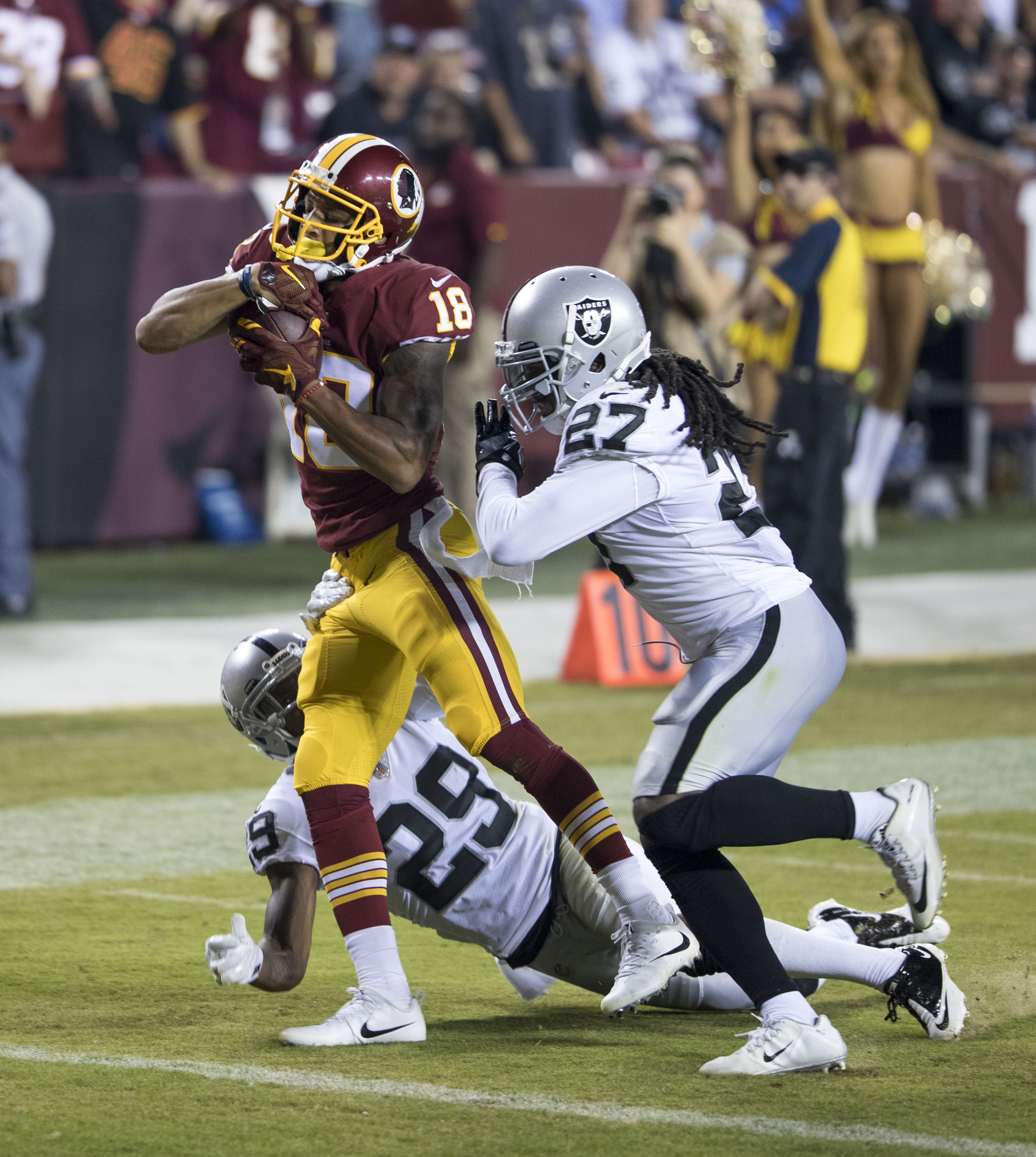
Doctson scoring his first career touchdown in a game against the Oakland Raiders in 2017

Doctson was drafted in the first round, 22nd overall, by the Washington Redskins in the 2016 NFL draft. Doctson sat out the preseason due to an Achilles injury. He made his first career reception in the season opener in a 16–38 loss on Monday Night Football to the Pittsburgh Steelers. During pregame warmups in Week 3 against the New York Giants, Doctson aggravated his Achilles injury keeping him sidelined until October 21, 2016, when he was placed on injured reserve.

In a 2017 game against the Oakland Raiders, Doctson recorded his first career touchdown on a 52-yard reception. He recorded an 11-yard touchdown reception in the win over the San Francisco 49ers. Doctson made an essential diving 38-yard reception against the Seattle Seahawks with less than two minutes and setting up the Redskins at the one yard marker in Seahawks' territory. The following play running back Rob Kelley scored a touchdown winning the game for the Redskins with a final score of 17–14. In the Thanksgiving game over the Giants, he scored the final touchdown that gave the Redskins both the lead and win.

In 2018, Doctson played in 15 games with 12 starts, finishing as the Redskins second-leading receiver with 44 catches for 532 yards and two touchdowns. On May 1, 2019, the Redskins declined the fifth-year option on Doctson's contract, making him a free agent in 2020. On August 31, 2019, the Redskins released Doctson.

=== Minnesota Vikings ===
On September 2, 2019, Doctson signed with the Minnesota Vikings on a one-year deal. He was placed on injured reserve on September 12, 2019. He was designated for return from injured reserve on October 30, 2019, and began practicing with the team again. He was activated on November 15, 2019, prior to Week 11. He played seven snaps without making a reception in the Vikings' 27–23 comeback win over the Denver Broncos, but was waived on November 26, 2019.

=== New York Jets ===
On February 22, 2020, Doctson signed with the New York Jets. On August 6, 2020, he announced he would opt out of the 2020 season due to the COVID-19 pandemic. According to reports, Doctson was set on traveling to Africa for a humanitarian mission, because he "feels that his calling is to help the underprivileged at this time". Doctson was released on May 7, 2021.

=== Arizona Cardinals ===
On September 3, 2021, Doctson signed with the practice squad of the Arizona Cardinals. He was released on October 12, 2021.

== Career statistics ==
=== NFL ===
Year	Team	Games		Receiving				
Year	Team	GP	GS	Rec	Yds	Avg	Lng	TD
2016	WAS	2	0	2	66	33.0	57	0
2017	WAS	16	14	35	502	14.3	52	6
2018	WAS	15	12	44	532	12.1	32	2
2019	MIN	1	0	0	0	0.0	0	0
Career		34	26	81	1,100	13.6	57	8

=== College ===
Season	Team	Receiving				
Season	Team	Rec	Yds	Avg	Lng	TD
2011	Wyoming	35	393	11.2	80	5
2013	TCU	36	440	12.2	37	4
2014	TCU	65	1,018	15.7	84	11
2015	TCU	79	1,327	16.8	55	14
Career		214	3,177	14.8	84	34
