= Josh Carraway =

American football player (born 1994)

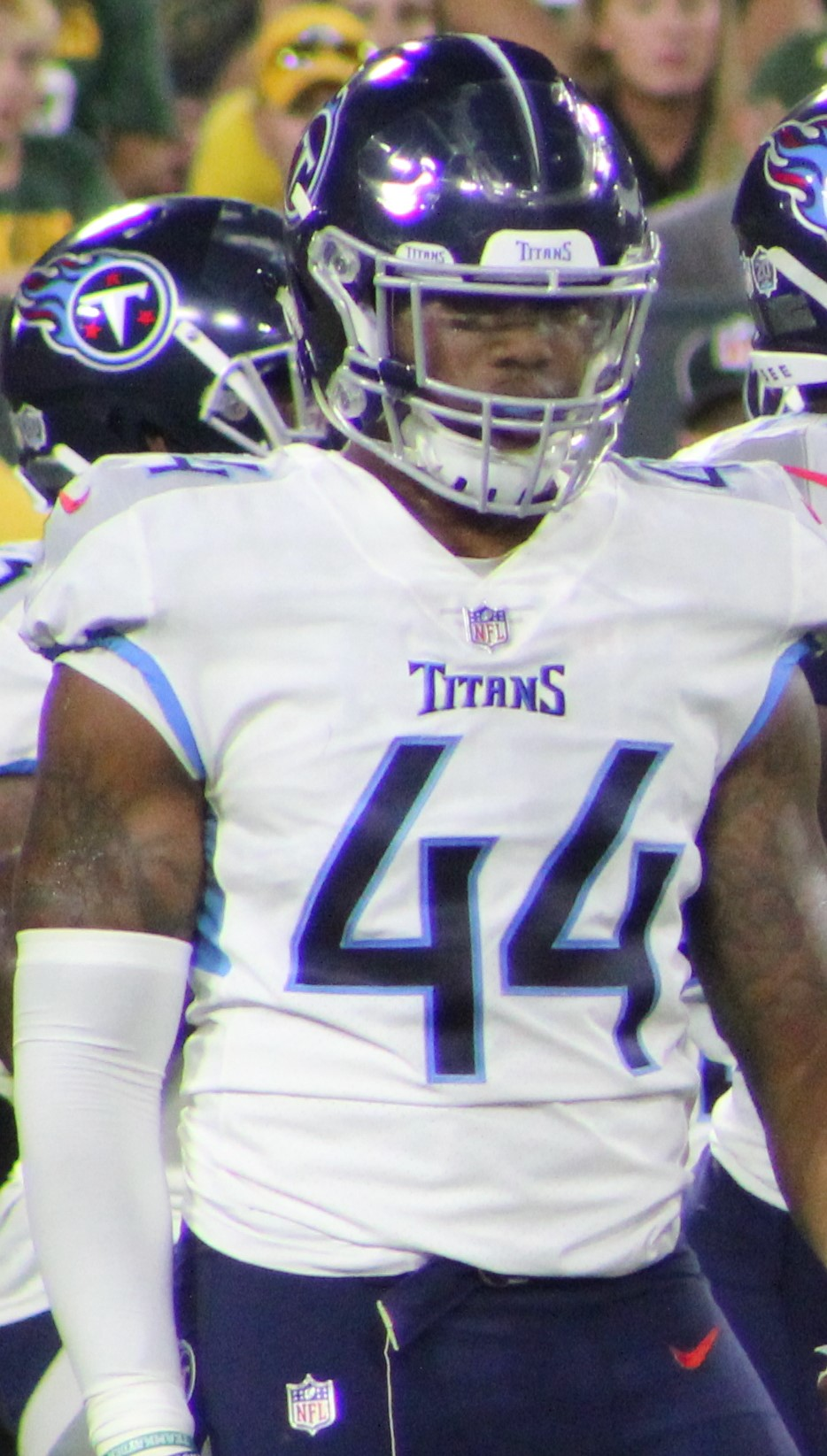
- Carraway with the Tennessee Titans in 2018

No. 44
- Position: Linebacker

Personal information
- Born: April 13, 1994 (age 32); Flower Mound, Texas, U.S.
- Listed height: 6 ft 3 in (1.91 m)
- Listed weight: 242 lb (110 kg)

Career information
- High school: Edward S. Marcus (Flower Mound)
- College: TCU
- NFL draft: 2017: 7th round, 227th overall pick

Career history
- Tennessee Titans (2017); Washington Redskins (2018)*; Los Angeles Rams (2019)
- * Offseason or practice squad member only

Awards and highlights
- 2× First-team All-Big 12 (2015, 2016)
- Stats at Pro Football Reference

Joshua Silas Carraway (born April 13, 1994) is an American former professional football player who was a linebacker in the National Football League (NFL). He was selected by the Tennessee Titans in the seventh round of the 2017 NFL draft after playing college football for the TCU Horned Frogs.

== College career ==
Carraway was named All-Big 12 Conference his final two years of college. He led his team with 9.5 sacks as a junior, and recorded eleven tackles for loss while leading his Texas Christian University team with eight sacks as a senior.

== Professional career ==
Pre-draft measurables
Height	Weight	Arm length	Hand span	40-yard dash	20-yard shuttle	Three-cone drill	Vertical jump	Broad jump	Bench press
6 ft 3 in (1.91 m)	242 lb (110 kg)	34 1/4 in (0.87 m)	9 1/4 in (0.23 m)	4.74 s	4.44 s	7.20 s	29.5 in (0.75 m)	10 ft 0 in (3.05 m)	25 reps
All values from NFL Combine

=== Tennessee Titans ===
Carraway was selected by the Tennessee Titans in the seventh round, 227th overall, in the 2017 NFL draft. On May 12, 2017, the Titans signed Carraway to a four-year, $2.48 million contract that also includes a signing bonus of $87,086. He was waived on October 3, 2017, and was re-signed to the practice squad. He was promoted back to the active roster on December 9, 2017.

On September 1, 2018, Carraway was waived by the Titans.

=== Washington Redskins ===
On November 26, 2018, Carraway was signed to the Washington Redskins practice squad.

=== Los Angeles Rams ===
On May 2, 2019, Carraway signed with the Los Angeles Rams. He suffered a torn Achilles tendon in the preseason and was ruled out for the season. He was waived/injured during final roster cuts on August 31, 2019, and reverted to the team's injured reserve list the next day.
