= Aaron Green (American football) =

American football player (born 1992)

No. 36, 37, 22
- Position: Running back

Personal information
- Born: October 15, 1992 (age 34); San Antonio, Texas, U.S.
- Listed height: 5 ft 11 in (1.80 m)
- Listed weight: 201 lb (91 kg)

Career information
- High school: James Madison (San Antonio)
- College: Nebraska (2011); TCU (2012–2015)
- NFL draft: 2016: undrafted

Career history
- Los Angeles Rams (2016); Dallas Cowboys (2017)*; Buffalo Bills (2017–2018)*; San Antonio Commanders (2019)
- * Offseason or practice squad member only

Awards and highlights
- Second-team All-Big 12 (2014)
- Stats at Pro Football Reference

Aaron Green (born October 15, 1992) is an American former professional football player who was a running back in the National Football League (NFL). He played college football for the TCU Horned Frogs and was signed by the Los Angeles Rams as an undrafted free agent in 2016.

== Early life ==
Green attended James Madison High School. He accepted a football scholarship from the University of Nebraska–Lincoln. He transferred to Texas Christian University after his freshman season. He sat out the 2012 season to comply with the NCAA transfer rules.

He became a starter for the Horned Frogs as a junior, leading the team with 922 rushing yards and 9 touchdowns on a 7.1 per carry average. As senior, he appeared in 13 games (10 starts), finishing seventh in school history with 1,272 rushing yards on the season.

== Professional career ==
Pre-draft measurables
Height	Weight	40-yard dash	10-yard split	20-yard split	20-yard shuttle	Three-cone drill	Vertical jump	Broad jump	Bench press
5 ft 11 in (1.80 m)	203 lb (92 kg)	4.56 s	1.54 s	2.59 s	4.04 s	6.81 s	32.5 in (0.83 m)	10 ft 0 in (3.05 m)	18 reps
All values are from Pro Day

=== Los Angeles Rams ===
Green was signed as an undrafted free agent by the Los Angeles Rams after the 2016 NFL draft on May 4. On September 3, 2016, he was released by the Rams during final team cuts and was signed to the practice squad the next day. He was promoted to the active roster on December 23, 2016.

On September 2, 2017, Green was waived by the Rams.

=== Dallas Cowboys ===
On November 27, 2017, Green was signed to the Dallas Cowboys' practice squad. He was released on December 18, 2017.

=== Buffalo Bills ===
On January 2, 2018, Green was signed to the Buffalo Bills' practice squad. He signed a reserve/future contract with the Bills on January 8, 2018. He was waived/injured by the Bills on May 14, 2018, and placed on injured reserve. He was released with an injury settlement on May 22, 2018.

=== San Antonio Commanders ===
On August 26, 2018, Green signed with the San Antonio Commanders of the Alliance of American Football. He was a backup behind Kenneth Farrow until the league folded in April 2019.
