= Halapoulivaati Vaitai =

American football player (born 1993)

Profile
- Position: Offensive guard

Personal information
- Born: June 16, 1993 (age 33); Fort Worth, Texas, U.S.
- Listed height: 6 ft 6 in (1.98 m)
- Listed weight: 322 lb (146 kg)

Career information
- High school: Haltom (Haltom City, Texas)
- College: TCU (2012–2015)
- NFL draft: 2016: 5th round, 164th overall pick

Career history
- Philadelphia Eagles (2016–2019); Detroit Lions (2020–2023)

Awards and highlights
- Super Bowl champion (LII); Built Ford Tough Offensive Line of the Year (2017); 2× Second-team All-Big 12 (2014, 2015)

Career NFL statistics
- Games played: 86
- Games started: 48
- Stats at Pro Football Reference

Halapoulivaati Vaitai (born June 16, 1993) is an American former professional football player who was an offensive guard in the National Football League (NFL). He played college football for the TCU Horned Frogs. He was selected by the Philadelphia Eagles in the fifth round of the 2016 NFL draft. He was born in Texas, but his parents are from Tonga.

== Early life ==
Vaitai attended Haltom High School where he played on the football team alongside his two younger brothers, who are twins. Halapoulivaati played tackle, Will played left guard, and Kevin played center. Vaitai was ranked as the 40th best high school offensive line prospect in the country and ranked third in Texas during his senior season in 2011–12. In addition to TCU, he had scholarship offers to Michigan State, Texas Tech, Arkansas, and Utah.

== College career ==
As a freshman in 2012, Vaitai appeared in five games as a backup offensive lineman. As a sophomore in 2013, he appeared in 12 games with seven starts. Five of his starts were at the right tackle position with two being at the left tackle position. As a junior in 2014, Vaitai was a second-team All-Big 12 Conference selection. He started all 13 games at right tackle. He helped the TCU offense finish second in the nation in scoring with an average of 46.5 points-per-game and tied for fifth in total offense with an average of 533 yards-per-game. As a senior in 2015, he was a second-team All-Big 12 selection by head coaches and the Associated Press. He played in 12 of 13 total games with 10 starts. He was a member of an offensive line that helped the Horned Frogs produce both a 1,000-yard rusher and receiver for only the second time in school history.

== Professional career ==
Pre-draft measurables
Height	Weight	Arm length	Hand span	40-yard dash	10-yard split	20-yard split	20-yard shuttle	Three-cone drill	Vertical jump	Broad jump	Bench press
6 ft 6 in (1.98 m)	320 lb (145 kg)	34 1/4 in (0.87 m)	10 5/8 in (0.27 m)	5.26 s	1.79 s	3.05 s	4.56 s	7.69 s	32.0 in (0.81 m)	9 ft 5 in (2.87 m)	27 reps
All values from NFL Combine/Pro Day

=== Philadelphia Eagles ===
Vaitai was selected in the fifth round, 164th overall, by the Philadelphia Eagles, which was traded to them by the Pittsburgh Steelers in exchange for Brandon Boykin. He signed his rookie contract with the Eagles on May 6, 2016. The contract was for four years and $2,565,124. After starting right tackle Lane Johnson was suspended for ten games, Vaitai made his first start in Week 5. He held the starting job through Week 11 before suffering an MCL sprain in that game, keeping him out of the starting lineup the rest of the season.

In the 2017 season, Vaitai filled in for right-tackle Lane Johnson against the Carolina Panthers due to injury. He then filled in for injured left-tackle Jason Peters in Week 7 against the Washington Redskins and for the rest of the 2017 season. Vaitai ended the 2017 season with a Super Bowl championship for the Eagles when they defeated the Patriots in Super Bowl LII.

=== Detroit Lions ===
On March 26, 2020, Vaitai signed a five-year, $50 million contract with the Detroit Lions. He was placed on injured reserve on November 25, 2020. On December 19, 2020, Vaitai was activated off of injured reserve.

On September 5, 2022, Vaitai was placed on injured reserve with a back injury. On September 14, Vaitai underwent back surgery. He was ruled out for the remainder of the season on October 28.

On March 23, 2023, Vaitai agreed to take a pay cut to remain with the Lions, and removed the 2024 season from his contract as a result. On November 14, Vaitai was placed on injured reserve with a knee injury.

== Personal life ==
Vaitai is the son of Talikavili and Shirley Vaitai and is of Tongan descent. He is married to former TCU women's basketball player Caitlin Diaz.
