= 2017 Kansas Jayhawks football team =

American college football season

2017 Kansas Jayhawks football
- Conference: Big 12 Conference
- Record: 1–11 (0–9 Big 12)
- Head coach: David Beaty (3rd season)
- Offensive coordinator: Doug Meacham (1st season)
- Offensive scheme: Spread
- Co-defensive coordinators: Clint Bowen (4th season); Kenny Perry (3rd season)
- Base defense: 4–3
- Home stadium: Memorial Stadium

2017 Big 12 Conference football standings
	Conf.			Overall
Team	W		L	W		L
No. 3 Oklahoma y$^	8	–	1	12	–	2
No. 9 TCU y	7	–	2	11	–	3
No. 14 Oklahoma State	6	–	3	10	–	3
Texas	5	–	4	7	–	6
West Virginia	5	–	4	7	–	6
Kansas State	5	–	4	8	–	5
Iowa State	5	–	4	8	–	5
Texas Tech	3	–	6	6	–	7
Baylor	1	–	8	1	–	11
Kansas	0	–	9	1	–	11
Championship: Oklahoma 41, TCU 17
^ – College Football Playoff participant; $ – Conference champion; y – Championship game participant; Rankings from AP Poll

The 2017 Kansas Jayhawks football team represented the University of Kansas in the 2017 NCAA Division I FBS football season. It was the Jayhawks 128th season. The Jayhawks were led by third-year head coach David Beaty. They played their home games at Memorial Stadium and were members of the Big 12 Conference.

Head coach David Beaty received a contract extension following the Jayhawks' 2016 season keeping him under contract until the conclusion of the 2021 season.

The Jayhawks entered the season with a 41-game road losing streak that dates back to the 2009 season when Kansas defeated UTEP 34–7, which was extended to 46 during the season. The Jayhawks have also lost 39 of their last 41 games against FBS opponents, including 12 straight. The Jayhawks also finished the season with an 11 game losing streak, losing every game after they defeated Southeast Missouri State in their season opener. Since the conclusion of the 2015 season, the team has gone 3–33.

The Jayhawks returned 2nd team All-Big 12 junior defensive end, Dorance Armstrong, who was also named Pre-season Big 12 Defensive Player of the year for the 2017 season.

== All-conference players lost ==
Position	Player	1st/2nd/HM
S	Fish Smithson	1st
OL	D'Andre Banks	HM
K	Matthew Wyman	HM
FB	Michael Zunica	HM

== Returning all-conference players ==
Position	Player	Year	1st/2nd/HM
DL	Dorance Armstrong	Junior	2nd
OL	Hakeem Adeniji	Sophomore	HM
WR	LaQuvionte Gonzales	Senior	HM
DB	Mike Lee	Sophomore	HM
P	Cole Moos	Senior	HM
WR	Steven Sims	Junior	HM
DL	Daniel Wise	Junior	HM

== Schedule ==
Date	Time	Opponent	Site	TV	Result	Attendance
September 2	6:00 p.m.	SE Missouri State*	Memorial Stadium; Lawrence, KS	Jayhawk TV	W 38–16	32,134
September 9	3:00 p.m.	Central Michigan*	Memorial Stadium; Lawrence, KS	FSN	L 27–45	28,531
September 16	11:00 a.m.	at Ohio*	Peden Stadium; Athens, OH	ESPNU	L 30–42	22,056
September 23	11:00 a.m.	West Virginia	Memorial Stadium; Lawrence, KS	ESPNU	L 34–56	23,901
October 7	11:00 a.m.	Texas Tech^{†}	Memorial Stadium; Lawrence, KS	FS1	L 19–65	21,050
October 14	11:00 a.m.	at Iowa State	Jack Trice Stadium; Ames, IA	FSN	L 0–45	55,593
October 21	7:00 p.m.	at No. 4 TCU	Amon G. Carter Stadium; Fort Worth, TX	FOX	L 0–43	42,969
October 28	2:00 p.m.	Kansas State	Memorial Stadium; Lawrence, KS (Sunflower Showdown)	FS1	L 20–30	36,223
November 4	11:00 a.m.	Baylor	Memorial Stadium; Lawrence, KS	FSN	L 9–38	21,797
November 11	5:00 p.m.	at Texas	Darrell K Royal–Texas Memorial Stadium; Austin, TX	Jayhawk TV/LHN	L 27–42	96,557
November 18	2:30 p.m.	No. 3 Oklahoma	Memorial Stadium; Lawrence, KS	ESPN	L 3–41	22,854
November 25	11:00 a.m.	at No. 18 Oklahoma State	Boone Pickens Stadium; Stillwater, OK	FS1	L 17–58	56,790
*Non-conference game; ^{†}Homecoming; Rankings from AP Poll released prior to the game; All times are in Central time

Schedule source:

== Game summaries ==
=== Southeast Missouri State ===
	1	2	3	4	Total
Redhawks	0	7	3	6	16
Jayhawks	14	7	14	3	38

=== Central Michigan ===
	1	2	3	4	Total
Chippewas	0	24	7	14	45
Jayhawks	3	3	14	7	27

=== At Ohio ===
	1	2	3	4	Total
Jayhawks	0	14	0	16	30
Bobcats	11	14	14	3	42

=== West Virginia ===
	1	2	3	4	Total
Mountaineers	7	28	0	21	56
Jayhawks	3	10	14	7	34

=== Texas Tech ===
	1	2	3	4	Total
Red Raiders	21	14	13	17	65
Jayhawks	7	3	9	0	19

=== At Iowa State ===
	1	2	3	4	Total
Jayhawks	0	0	0	0	0
Cyclones	14	10	14	7	45

=== At TCU ===
	1	2	3	4	Total
Jayhawks	0	0	0	0	0
Horned Frogs	10	14	19	0	43

=== Kansas State ===
	1	2	3	4	Total
Wildcats	7	3	10	10	30
Jayhawks	6	0	0	14	20

=== Baylor ===
	1	2	3	4	Total
Bears	0	21	7	10	38
Jayhawks	0	6	3	0	9

=== At Texas ===
	1	2	3	4	Total
Jayhawks	7	3	10	7	27
Longhorns	28	7	0	7	42

=== Oklahoma ===
	1	2	3	4	Total
Sooners	7	14	7	13	41
Jayhawks	0	3	0	0	3

=== At Oklahoma State ===
	1	2	3	4	Total
Jayhawks	3	7	7	0	17
Cowboys	10	24	14	10	58

== Roster ==
This is a preliminary roster based on the 2016 roster with seniors removed. The roster will become official during spring practice for outgoing transfers and again when training camp starts for incoming freshmen, walk-ons, and transfers.

2017 Kansas Jayhawks football team roster
Players
Coaches
Offense

Pos.	#	Name	Class
WR	1	LaQuvionte Gonzalez	Sr
WR	3	Chase Harrell	So
WR	4	Tyler Patrick	Jr
WR	5	Bobby Hartzog, Jr.	Sr
QB	6	Dagan Haehn	So
QB	8	Keaton Perry	Jr
QB	9	Carter Stanley	So
WR	12	Darious Crawley	Sr
QB	13	Ryan Willis	Jr
QB	15	Deondre Ford	Sr
WR	16	Steven Sims	Jr
WR	17	Keegan Brewer	So
TE	19	Jace Sternberger	So
WR	20	Emmanuel Moore	Jr
RB	24	Taylor Martin	Jr
WR	26	Chris Bell	So
RB	27	James Sullivan	Sr
RB	32	Resse Randall	Jr
RB	33	Ryan Schadler	Jr
OL	55	Jocob Bragg	Jr
OL	59	Jackson Jenkins	So
OL	63	Aaron Garza	So
OL	64	Kyle Pullia	Sr
OL	65	Jayson Rhodes	Sr
OL	66	Hunter Saulsbury	So
OL	68	Beau Lawrence	So
OL	69	Mesa Ribordy	So
OL	71	Cam Durley	So
OL	73	Larry Hughes	Jr
OL	74	Clyde McCauley III	Jr
OL	77	Joe Gibson	Sr
OL	78	Hakeem Adeniji	So
TE	84	Ben Johnson	Sr
TE	87	John Kelly	So
WR	88	Jeremiah Booker	Jr

Defense

Pos.	#	Name	Class
CB	2	DeAnte Ford	So
S	4	Shaquille Richmond	So
DT	6	Isi Holani	Sr
CB	7	Derrick Neal	Sr
CB	11	Stephan Robinson	Jr
CB	15	Shola Ayinde	So
DE	17	Josh Ehambe	Jr
S	18	Frank Seurer, Jr.	Sr
S	19	Tyrone Miller, Jr.	Jr
CB	26	Colin Spencer	Sr
CB	27	Luke Curtis	So
LB	29	Joe Dineen, Jr.	Sr
LB	31	Osaze Ogbebor	Jr
LB	41	Kendall Duckworth	Jr
DE	46	Dorance Armstrong	Jr
CB	47	Nathan Miller	So
LB	49	Hudson Hall	Jr
DE	52	Mazin Aql	So
DT	54	Jacky Dezir	Sr
DE	56	Anthony Olobia	So
DT	91	D. J. Williams	Jr
DT	92	Lay'Trion Jones	Jr
DT	95	Devon Williams	Jr
DT	96	Daniel Wise	Jr
DE	97	Kellen Ash	Sr
DT	98	Jason Nix	Jr
RE	99	Deelsaac Davis	Sr

Special teams

Pos.	#	Name	Class
K	14	Nick Bartolotta	Sr
P	28	Michael Valentine	So
P	36	Cole Moos	Sr
K	40	Ryan Weese	Sr
K/P	43	Quinton Conaway	So

Head coach

- David Beaty

Coordinators/assistant coaches

- Clint Bowen (assistant head coach / defensive coordinator / safeties)
- Todd Bradford (linebackers)
- Joe DeForest (special teams coordinator / defensive assistant)
- Tony Hull (running backs)
- Rob Likens (offensive coordinator / quarterbacks)
- Kenny Perry (co-defensive coordinator / cornerbacks)
- Jason Phillips (wide receivers)
- Michael Slater (defensive line)
- Zach Yenser (run game coordinator / offensive line)
- Je'Ney Jackson (director of football strength & conditioning)

Legend

- (C) Team captain
- (S) Suspended
- (I) Ineligible
- Injured
- Redshirt

Roster
Last update: December 14, 2016
