= 2018 Kansas Jayhawks football team =

American college football season

2018 Kansas Jayhawks football
- Conference: Big 12 Conference
- Record: 3–9 (1–8 Big 12)
- Head coach: David Beaty (4th season)
- Offensive coordinator: Doug Meacham (2nd season; first six games)
- Offensive scheme: Spread
- Defensive coordinator: Clint Bowen (5th season)
- Base defense: 4–3
- Home stadium: David Booth Kansas Memorial Stadium

2018 Big 12 Conference football standings
	Conf.			Overall
Team	W		L	W		L
No. 4 Oklahoma y$^	8	–	1	12	–	2
No. 9 Texas y	7	–	2	10	–	4
Iowa State	6	–	3	8	–	5
No. 20 West Virginia	6	–	3	8	–	4
TCU	4	–	5	7	–	6
Baylor	4	–	5	7	–	6
Oklahoma State	3	–	6	7	–	6
Kansas State	3	–	6	5	–	7
Texas Tech	3	–	6	5	–	7
Kansas	1	–	8	3	–	9
Championship: Oklahoma 39, Texas 27
^ – College Football Playoff participant; $ – Conference champion; y – Championship game participant; Rankings from AP Poll

The 2018 Kansas Jayhawks football team represented the University of Kansas in the 2018 NCAA Division I FBS football season. It was the Jayhawks 129th season. The Jayhawks were led by fourth-year head coach David Beaty. They were members of the Big 12 Conference. They played their games at David Booth Kansas Memorial Stadium, formerly Memorial Stadium. (The stadium was renamed following the Jayhawks 2017 season in December 2017 after a $50 million renovation was completed that was donated by Kansas alumnus David Booth).

The Jayhawks ended multiple losing streaks during the season, the longest being a 46 game road losing streak which ended with a 31–7 win over Central Michigan. The win also ended a 12 game losing streak against FBS opponents. With a 27–26 win over TCU, KU ended a 10 game losing streak against Big 12 teams. With back–to–back wins over Central Michigan and Rutgers, Kansas earned back-to-back wins against any opponent for the first time since 2011 and their first back-to-back wins over FBS opponents since 2009. Two other major losing streaks were still active at the end of the season, they have lost 44 consecutive road games in the Big 12 as well as 30 consecutive losses against teams ranked in the AP Poll. Following their 7th loss of the season to Kansas State, the Jayhawks became ineligible for a bowl game for the 10th consecutive season.

On November 5, Kansas athletic director Jeff Long announced that Beaty will not be retained as head coach but he was able to finish the season and was officially fired at the end of the season.

== All-conference players lost ==
Position	Player	1st/2nd/HM	Reason
TE	Ben Johnson	2nd	Graduation
DL	Dorance Armstrong	2nd	Entered NFL draft

== Returning all-conference players ==
Position	Player	Year	1st/2nd/HM
DL	Daniel Wise	Sr.	1st
OL	Hakeem Adeniji	Jr.	HM
WR/KR/PR	Steven Sims	Sr.	HM
DB	Bryce Torneden	Jr.	HM
K	Gabriel Rui	Sr.	HM

== Preseason ==
=== Big 12 media poll ===
The Big 12 media poll was released on July 12, 2018 with the Jayhawks predicted to finish in last place receiving all last place votes.

Media poll
Predicted finish	Team	Votes (1st place)
1	Oklahoma	509 (46)
2	West Virginia	432 (2)
3	TCU	390 (1)
4	Texas	370 (1)
5	Oklahoma State	300
6	Kansas State	283 (2)
7	Iowa State	250
8	Texas Tech	149
9	Baylor	125
10	Kansas	52

== Schedule ==
Date	Time	Opponent	Site	TV	Result	Attendance
September 1	6:00 p.m.	No. 18 (FCS) Nicholls*	David Booth Kansas Memorial Stadium; Lawrence, KS	Jayhawk TV	L 23–26 ^{OT}	24,305
September 8	2:00 p.m.	at Central Michigan*	Kelly/Shorts Stadium; Mount Pleasant, MI	ESPN+	W 31–7	18,127
September 15	11:00 a.m.	Rutgers*	David Booth Kansas Memorial Stadium; Lawrence, KS	FSN	W 55–14	28,044
September 22	2:30 p.m.	at Baylor	McLane Stadium; Waco, TX	FS1	L 7–26	36,725
September 29	11:00 a.m.	Oklahoma State^{†}	David Booth Kansas Memorial Stadium; Lawrence, KS	FSN	L 28–48	18,364
October 6	11:00 a.m.	at No. 9 West Virginia	Mountaineer Field; Morgantown, WV	ESPN2	L 22–38	57,419
October 20	2:30 p.m.	at Texas Tech	Jones AT&T Stadium; Lubbock, TX	FS1	L 16–48	54,402
October 27	2:00 p.m.	TCU	David Booth Kansas Memorial Stadium; Lawrence, KS	FS1	W 27–26	15,069
November 3	11:00 a.m.	Iowa State	David Booth Kansas Memorial Stadium; Lawrence, KS	FSN	L 3–27	15,543
November 10	11:00 a.m.	at Kansas State	Bill Snyder Family Football Stadium; Manhattan, KS (Sunflower Showdown)	FSN	L 17–21	50,062
November 17	6:30 p.m.	at No. 6 Oklahoma	Gaylord Family Oklahoma Memorial Stadium; Norman, OK	FOX	L 40–55	86,371
November 23	11:00 a.m.	No. 11 Texas	David Booth Kansas Memorial Stadium; Lawrence, KS	FS1	L 17–24	15,219
*Non-conference game; ^{†}Homecoming; Rankings from AP Poll released prior to the game; All times are in Central time

== Game summaries ==
=== Nicholls ===
	1	2	3	4	OT	Total
No. 18 (FCS) Colonels	7	3	7	3	6	26
Jayhawks	7	3	0	10	3	23

=== At Central Michigan ===
	1	2	3	4	Total
Jayhawks	0	7	14	10	31
Chippewas	0	0	7	0	7

=== Rutgers ===
	1	2	3	4	Total
Scarlet Knights	7	7	0	0	14
Jayhawks	17	14	10	14	55

=== At Baylor ===
	1	2	3	4	Total
Jayhawks	0	0	7	0	7
Bears	7	16	3	0	26

=== Oklahoma State ===
	1	2	3	4	Total
Cowboys	14	10	10	14	48
Jayhawks	0	7	7	14	28

=== At West Virginia ===
	1	2	3	4	Total
Jayhawks	7	0	7	8	22
No. 9 Mountaineers	14	7	7	10	38

=== At Texas Tech ===
	1	2	3	4	Total
Jayhawks	3	0	6	7	16
Red Raiders	3	21	3	21	48

=== TCU ===
	1	2	3	4	Total
Horned Frogs	0	10	7	9	26
Jayhawks	7	0	10	10	27

=== Iowa State ===
	1	2	3	4	Total
Cyclones	14	6	7	0	27
Jayhawks	0	3	0	0	3

=== At Kansas State ===
	1	2	3	4	Total
Jayhawks	0	3	7	7	17
Wildcats	0	0	14	7	21

=== At Oklahoma ===
	1	2	3	4	Total
Jayhawks	7	3	7	23	40
No. 6 Sooners	7	14	14	20	55

=== Texas ===
	1	2	3	4	Total
No. 11 Longhorns	7	0	14	3	24
Jayhawks	0	0	0	17	17
