= 2016 Kansas Jayhawks football team =

American college football season

2016 Kansas Jayhawks football
- Conference: Big 12 Conference
- Record: 2–10 (1–8 Big 12)
- Head coach: David Beaty (2nd season)
- Offensive coordinator: Rob Likens (2nd season)
- Offensive scheme: Spread
- Co-defensive coordinators: Clint Bowen (3rd season); Kenny Perry (2nd season)
- Base defense: 4–3
- Home stadium: Memorial Stadium

2016 Big 12 Conference football standings
	Conf.			Overall
Team	W		L	W		L
No. 5 Oklahoma $	9	–	0	11	–	2
No. 11 Oklahoma State	7	–	2	10	–	3
No. 18 West Virginia	7	–	2	10	–	3
Kansas State	6	–	3	9	–	4
TCU	4	–	5	6	–	7
Baylor	3	–	6	7	–	6
Texas	3	–	6	5	–	7
Texas Tech	3	–	6	5	–	7
Iowa State	2	–	7	3	–	9
Kansas	1	–	8	2	–	10
$ – Conference champion; Rankings from AP Poll

The 2016 Kansas Jayhawks football team represented the University of Kansas in the 2016 NCAA Division I FBS football season. The Jayhawks were led by second year head coach David Beaty. They played home games at Memorial Stadium and were members of the Big 12 Conference.

The Jayhawks entered the season with a 15-game losing streak overall, which ended with a 55–6 win over Rhode Island, They also entered the season with 12 consecutive losses within the Big 12, which expanded to 19 during the season and ended with their 24–21 win over Texas. The win over Texas was Kansas's first win over Texas since 1938. The Jayhawks also entered the season with a 35-game road losing streak dating back to a 34–7 win against UTEP during the 2009 season, which was expanded to 40 losses during the season. The Jayhawks were picked 10th in the Big 12's preseason poll, receiving 25 of the possible 26 last place votes.

The Jayhawks returned senior safety Anthony "Fish" Smithson who led the nation in solo tackles.

The Jayhawks finished the season 2–10, 1–8 in Big 12 play to finish in last place.

== Schedule ==
Date	Time	Opponent	Site	TV	Result	Attendance
September 3	6:00 p.m.	Rhode Island*	Memorial Stadium; Lawrence, KS	Jayhawk TV	W 55–6	28,864
September 10	1:30 p.m.	Ohio*	Memorial Stadium; Lawrence, KS	FSN	L 21–37	28,467
September 17	11:00 a.m.	at Memphis*	Liberty Bowl Memorial Stadium; Memphis, TN	ESPNU	L 7–43	34,448
September 29	7:30 p.m.	at Texas Tech	Jones AT&T Stadium; Lubbock, TX	FS1	L 19–55	59,494
October 8	11:00 a.m.	TCU	Memorial Stadium; Lawrence, KS	ESPNU	L 23–24	23,946
October 15	2:30 p.m.	at No. 11 Baylor	McLane Stadium; Waco, TX	FS1	L 7–49	47,598
October 22	11:00 a.m.	Oklahoma State^{†}	Memorial Stadium; Lawrence, KS	FS1	L 20–44	26,262
October 29	6:00 p.m.	at No. 16 Oklahoma	Gaylord Family Oklahoma Memorial Stadium; Norman, OK	FS1	L 3–56	86,301
November 5	6:00 p.m.	at No. 14 West Virginia	Mountaineer Field; Morgantown, WV	ESPN2	L 21–48	56,343
November 12	11:00 a.m.	Iowa State	Memorial Stadium; Lawrence, KS	FSN	L 24–31	23,757
November 19	2:30 p.m.	Texas	Memorial Stadium; Lawrence, KS	ABC/ESPN2	W 24–21 ^{OT}	25,673
November 26	11:00 a.m.	at Kansas State	Bill Snyder Family Football Stadium; Manhattan, KS (Sunflower Showdown)	FS1	L 19–34	52,637
*Non-conference game; ^{†}Homecoming; Rankings from AP Poll released prior to the game; All times are in Central time

Schedule source:

== Game summaries ==
=== Rhode Island ===
	1	2	3	4	Total
Rams	0	6	0	0	6
Jayhawks	13	14	14	14	55

=== Ohio ===
	1	2	3	4	Total
Bobcats	15	13	6	3	37
Jayhawks	0	7	14	0	21

=== At Memphis ===
	1	2	3	4	Total
Jayhawks	0	7	0	0	7
Tigers	13	20	3	7	43

=== At Texas Tech ===
	1	2	3	4	Total
Jayhawks	0	9	10	0	19
Red Raiders	14	14	13	14	55

=== TCU ===
	1	2	3	4	Total
Horned Frogs	0	14	0	10	24
Jayhawks	7	3	13	0	23

=== At Baylor ===
	1	2	3	4	Total
Jayhawks	0	0	7	0	7
#11 Bears	21	21	7	0	49

=== Oklahoma State ===
	1	2	3	4	Total
Cowboys	7	10	17	10	44
Jayhawks	7	6	7	0	20

=== At Oklahoma ===
	1	2	3	4	Total
Jayhawks	3	0	0	0	3
#16 Sooners	7	21	28	0	56

=== At West Virginia ===
	1	2	3	4	Total
Jayhawks	0	0	14	7	21
#14 Mountaineers	10	21	14	3	48

=== Iowa State ===
	1	2	3	4	Total
Cyclones	3	7	12	9	31
Jayhawks	7	7	10	0	24

=== Texas ===
	1	2	3	4	OT	Total
Longhorns	7	0	7	7	0	21
Jayhawks	0	10	0	11	3	24

=== At Kansas State ===
	1	2	3	4	Total
Jayhawks	3	0	6	10	19
Wildcats	6	14	7	7	34

== Roster ==
2016 Kansas Jayhawks football team roster
Players
Coaches
Offense

Pos.	#	Name	Class
WR	1	LaQuvionte Gonzalez	Jr
QB	2	Montell Cozart	Jr
WR	3	Chase Harrell	Fr
WR	4	Tyler Patrick	So
WR	5	Bobby Hartzog, Jr.	Jr
QB	6	Dagan Haehn	Fr
QB	8	Keaton Perry	So
QB	9	Carter Stanley	Fr
WR	12	Darious Crawley	Jr
QB	13	Ryan Willis	So
QB	15	Deondre Ford	Jr
WR	16	Steven Sims	So
WR	17	Keegan Brewer	Fr
TE	19	Jace Sternberger	Fr
WR	20	Emmanuel Moore	So
RB	22	Ke'aun Kinner	Sr
RB	24	Taylor Martin	So
RB	25	J. J. Jolaoso	Sr
WR	26	Chris Bell	Fr
RB	27	James Sullivan	Jr
RB	32	Resse Randall	So
RB	33	Ryan Schadler	So
FB	44	Michael Zunica	Sr
OL	55	Jocob Bragg	So
OL	59	Jackson Jenkins	Fr
OL	62	D'Andre Banks	Sr
OL	63	Aaron Garza	Fr
OL	64	Kyle Pullia	Jr
OL	65	Jayson Rhodes	Jr
OL	66	Hunter Saulsbury	Fr
OL	68	Beau Lawrence	Fr
OL	69	Mesa Ribordy	Fr
OL	71	Cam Durley	Fr
OL	72	Will Smith	Sr
OL	73	Larry Hughes	So
OL	74	Clyde McCauley III	So
OL	77	Joe Gibson	Jr
OL	79	Jordan Shelley-Smith	Sr
WR	82	Shakiem Barbel	Sr
TE	84	Ben Johnson	Jr
WR	85	Austin Moses	Sr
TE	86	Brock Gilmore	Sr
TE	87	John Kelly	Fr
WR	88	Jeremiah Booker	So

Defense

Pos.	#	Name	Class
CB	2	DeAnte Ford	Fr
S	4	Shaquille Richmond	Fr
LB	5	Marcquis Roberts	Sr
DT	6	Isi Holani	Jr
CB	7	Derrick Neal	Jr
CB	8	Brandon Stewart	Sr
S	9	Fish Smithson	Sr
CB	11	Stephan Robinson	So
DE	13	Damani Mosby	Sr
CB	14	Chevy Graham	Sr
CB	15	Shola Ayinde	Fr
DE	17	Josh Ehambe	So
S	18	Frank Seurer, Jr.	Jr
S	19	Tyrone Miller, Jr.	So
LB	20	Keith Loneker, Jr.	Sr
S	22	Greg Allen	Sr
S	24	Bazie Bates IV	Sr
CB	25	Marnez Ogletree	Sr
CB	26	Colin Spencer	Jr
CB	27	Luke Curtis	Fr
LB	28	Courtney Arnick	Sr
LB	29	Joe Dineen, Jr.	Jr
S	30	Tevin Shaw	Sr
LB	31	Osaze Ogbebor	So
LB	41	Kendall Duckworth	So
DE	46	Dorance Armstrong	So
CB	47	Nathan Miller	Fr
LB	49	Hudson Hall	So
DE	52	Mazin Aql	Fr
DT	54	Jacky Dezir	Jr
DE	56	Anthony Olobia	Fr
LB	59	Cameron Rosser	Sr
DT	91	D. J. Williams	So
DT	92	Lay'Trion Jones	So
DT	95	Devon Williams	So
DT	96	Daniel Wise	So
DE	97	Kellen Ash	Jr
DT	98	Jason Nix	So
RE	99	Deelsaac Davis	Jr

Special teams

Pos.	#	Name	Class
K/P	7	Matthew Wyman	Sr
K	14	Nick Bartolotta	Jr
P	28	Michael Valentine	Fr
K	40	Ryan Weese	Jr
K/P	43	Quinton Conaway	Fr
LS	68	John Wirtel	Sr

Head coach

- David Beaty

Coordinators/assistant coaches

- Clint Bowen (assistant head coach / defensive coordinator / safeties)
- Todd Bradford (linebackers)
- Joe DeForest (special teams coordinator / defensive assistant)
- Tony Hull (running backs)
- Rob Likens (offensive coordinator / quarterbacks)
- Kenny Perry (co-defensive coordinator / cornerbacks)
- Jason Phillips (wide receivers)
- Michael Slater (defensive line)
- Zach Yenser (run game coordinator / offensive line)
- Je'Ney Jackson (director of football strength & conditioning)
- Connor Embree (graduate assistant)
- Nate Dreiling (graduate assistant)

Legend

- (C) Team captain
- (S) Suspended
- (I) Ineligible
- Injured
- Redshirt

Roster
Last update: June 29, 2016
