= 2015 Kansas Jayhawks football team =

American college football season

2015 Kansas Jayhawks football
- Conference: Big 12 Conference
- Record: 0–12 (0–9 Big 12)
- Head coach: David Beaty (1st season)
- Offensive coordinator: Rob Likens (1st season)
- Offensive scheme: Spread
- Co-defensive coordinators: Clint Bowen (2nd season); Kenny Perry (1st season)
- Base defense: 4–3
- Home stadium: Memorial Stadium

2015 Big 12 Conference football standings
	Conf.			Overall
Team	W		L	W		L
No. 5 Oklahoma $^	8	–	1	11	–	2
No. 20 Oklahoma State	7	–	2	10	–	3
No. 7 TCU	7	–	2	11	–	2
No. 13 Baylor	6	–	3	10	–	3
West Virginia	4	–	5	8	–	5
Texas Tech	4	–	5	7	–	6
Texas	4	–	5	5	–	7
Kansas State	3	–	6	6	–	7
Iowa State	2	–	7	3	–	9
Kansas	0	–	9	0	–	12
^ – College Football Playoff participant; $ – Conference champion; Rankings from AP Poll

The 2015 Kansas Jayhawks football team represented the University of Kansas in the 2015 NCAA Division I FBS football season. The Jayhawks were led by first year head coach David Beaty. The team played their home games at Memorial Stadium. The Jayhawks finished the season 0–12, 0–9 in conference play. They finished in last place in the Big 12 Conference. Their winless season was only the second time in school history they finished winless, the other time being in 1954.

== Coaching staff ==
Name	Position
David Beaty	Head coach
Clint Bowen	Assistant Head Coach/Defensive Coordinator
Rob Likens	Offensive Coordinator/Quarterbacks
Reggie Mitchell	Recruiting Coordinator/Running Backs
Zach Yenser	Run Game Coordinator/Offensive Line
Kevin Kane	Linebackers
Klint Kubiak	Wide Receivers
Calvin Thibodeaux	Defensive Line
Kenny Perry	Co-Defensive Coordinator/Cornerbacks
Je'Ney Jackson	Director of Football Strength & Conditioning
Connor Embree	Graduate Assistant
Nate Dreiling	Graduate Assistant

== Schedule ==
Date	Time	Opponent	Site	TV	Result	Attendance
September 5	11:00 a.m.	No. 16 (FCS) South Dakota State*	Memorial Stadium; Lawrence, KS	FSN	L 38–41	30,144
September 12	6:00 p.m.	Memphis*	Memorial Stadium; Lawrence, KS	JTV	L 23–55	37,798
September 26	11:00 a.m.	at Rutgers*	High Point Solutions Stadium; Piscataway, NJ	BTN	L 14–27	46,136
October 3	11:00 a.m.	at Iowa State	Jack Trice Stadium; Ames, IA	FSN	L 13–38	55,837
October 10	11:00 a.m.	No. 3 Baylor	Memorial Stadium; Lawrence, KS	FS1	L 7–66	25,910
October 17	11:00 a.m.	Texas Tech	Memorial Stadium; Lawrence, KS	FS1	L 20–30	25,186
October 24	2:30 p.m.	at No. 14 Oklahoma State	Boone Pickens Stadium; Stillwater, OK	FS1	L 10–58	59,486
October 31	2:30 p.m.	No. 14 Oklahoma^{†}	Memorial Stadium; Lawrence, KS	FS1	L 7–62	26,677
November 7	7:00 p.m.	at Texas	Darrell K Royal–Texas Memorial Stadium; Austin, TX	JTV	L 20–59	92,529
November 14	11:00 a.m.	at No. 15 TCU	Amon G. Carter Stadium; Fort Worth, TX	FS1	L 17–23	44,375
November 21	11:00 a.m.	West Virginia	Memorial Stadium; Lawrence, KS	FSN	L 0–49	21,415
November 28	3:00 p.m.	Kansas State	Memorial Stadium; Lawrence, KS (Sunflower Showdown)	FS1	L 14–45	23,842
*Non-conference game; ^{†}Homecoming; Rankings from AP Poll (and CFP Rankings, after November 3) released prior to game; All times are in Central time

Schedule source:

== Game summaries ==
=== No. 16 (FCS) South Dakota State ===
	1	2	3	4	Total
No. 16 (FCS) Jackrabbits	17	14	3	7	41
Jayhawks	7	7	14	10	38

Statistics	SDSU	KU
First downs	25	29
Total yards	463	576
Rushing yards	170	285
Passing yards	293	291
Turnovers	0	2
Time of possession	29:56	30:04

Team	Category	Player	Statistics
South Dakota State	Passing	Zach Lujan	17/33, 293 yards, 3 TD
South Dakota State	Rushing	Isaac Wallace	24 rushes, 118 yards, TD
South Dakota State	Receiving	Jake Wieneke	8 receptions, 160 yards, 2 TD
Kansas	Passing	Montell Cozart	25/38, 291 yards, TD, INT
Kansas	Rushing	Ke'aun Kinner	27 rushes, 157 yards, 2 TD
Kansas	Receiving	Tre' Parmalee	3 receptions, 82 yards

=== Memphis ===
	1	2	3	4	Total
Tigers	10	14	24	7	55
Jayhawks	10	3	7	3	23

Statistics	MEM	KU
First downs	34	23
Total yards	651	359
Rushing yards	281	194
Passing yards	370	165
Turnovers	3	0
Time of possession	28:26	31:34

Team	Category	Player	Statistics
Memphis	Passing	Paxton Lynch	22/25, 354 yards, 2 TD
Memphis	Rushing	Jamarius Henderson	11 rushes, 77 yards, TD
Memphis	Receiving	Mose Frazier	4 receptions, 77 yards
Kansas	Passing	Montell Cozart	13/28, 118 yards
Kansas	Rushing	Ke'aun Kinner	16 rushes, 113 yards, TD
Kansas	Receiving	Tyler Patrick	6 receptions, 38 yards

=== At Rutgers ===
	1	2	3	4	Total
Jayhawks	0	7	7	0	14
Scarlet Knights	7	13	7	0	27

Statistics	KU	RUTG
First downs	18	31
Total yards	342	513
Rushing yards	64	312
Passing yards	278	201
Turnovers	1	3
Time of possession	22:01	37:59

Team	Category	Player	Statistics
Kansas	Passing	Montell Cozart	13/18, 193 yards
Kansas	Rushing	De'Andre Mann	6 rushes, 40 yards
Kansas	Receiving	Tyler Patrick	3 receptions, 70 yards
Rutgers	Passing	Chris Laviano	18/25, 201 yards, 2 TD, 2 INT
Rutgers	Rushing	Josh Hicks	21 rushes, 113 yards, 2 TD
Rutgers	Receiving	Andre Patton	5 receptions, 53 yards

=== At Iowa State ===
	1	2	3	4	Total
Jayhawks	0	0	6	7	13
Cyclones	3	14	14	7	38

Statistics	KU	ISU
First downs	15	24
Total yards	288	512
Rushing yards	38	243
Passing yards	250	269
Turnovers	1	2
Time of possession	28:03	31:57

Team	Category	Player	Statistics
Kansas	Passing	Montell Cozart	15/21, 150 yards, TD
Kansas	Rushing	Ke'aun Kinner	11 rushes, 46 yards
Kansas	Receiving	Tre' Parmalee	5 receptions, 81 yards, TD
Iowa State	Passing	Sam B. Richardson	27/36, 269 yards, 2 TD, 2 INT
Iowa State	Rushing	Mike Warren	18 rushes, 175 yards, 2 TD
Iowa State	Receiving	Allen Lazard	6 receptions, 75 yards, TD

=== No. 3 Baylor ===
	1	2	3	4	Total
No. 3 Bears	24	28	14	0	66
Jayhawks	7	0	0	0	7

Statistics	BAY	KU
First downs	33	14
Total yards	644	227
Rushing yards	281	69
Passing yards	363	158
Turnovers	1	3
Time of possession	24:15	35:45

Team	Category	Player	Statistics
Baylor	Passing	Seth Russell	18/27, 246 yards, 3 TD
Baylor	Rushing	Shock Linwood	13 rushes, 135 yards, TD
Baylor	Receiving	Corey Coleman	7 receptions, 108 yards, 2 TD
Kansas	Passing	Ryan Willis	20/36, 158 yards, TD, INT
Kansas	Rushing	Taylor Cox	19 rushes, 45 yards
Kansas	Receiving	Jeremiah Booker	3 receptions, 39 yards

=== Texas Tech ===
	1	2	3	4	Total
Red Raiders	3	17	3	7	30
Jayhawks	0	0	6	14	20

Statistics	TTU	KU
First downs	29	26
Total yards	576	475
Rushing yards	222	145
Passing yards	354	330
Turnovers	2	3
Time of possession	29:37	30:23

Team	Category	Player	Statistics
Texas Tech	Passing	Patrick Mahomes	29/50, 354 yards, TD, INT
Texas Tech	Rushing	DeAndré Washington	23 rushes, 157 yards, TD
Texas Tech	Receiving	Zach Austin	8 receptions, 80 yards
Kansas	Passing	Ryan Willis	35/50, 330 yards, 2 TD, INT
Kansas	Rushing	De'Andre Mann	15 rushes, 107 yards
Kansas	Receiving	Tre' Parmalee	5 receptions, 84 yards, TD

=== At No. 14 Oklahoma State ===
	1	2	3	4	Total
Jayhawks	0	10	0	0	10
No. 14 Cowboys	14	21	21	2	58

Statistics	KU	OKST
First downs	9	33
Total yards	221	583
Rushing yards	30	202
Passing yards	191	381
Turnovers	2	0
Time of possession	22:37	37:23

Team	Category	Player	Statistics
Kansas	Passing	Ryan Willis	12/31, 191 yards, TD, 2 INT
Kansas	Rushing	De'Andre Mann	7 rushes, 30 yards
Kansas	Receiving	Tre' Parmalee	6 receptions, 115 yards
Oklahoma State	Passing	Mason Rudolph	20/26, 305 yards, TD
Oklahoma State	Rushing	Jeff Carr	12 rushes, 51 yards, TD
Oklahoma State	Receiving	James Washington	6 receptions, 103 yards, TD

=== No. 14 Oklahoma ===
	1	2	3	4	Total
No. 14 Sooners	21	17	17	7	62
Jayhawks	0	7	0	0	7

Statistics	OKLA	KU
First downs	35	15
Total yards	710	216
Rushing yards	265	35
Passing yards	445	181
Turnovers	2	2
Time of possession	33:39	26:21

Team	Category	Player	Statistics
Oklahoma	Passing	Baker Mayfield	27/32, 383 yards, 4 TD
Oklahoma	Rushing	Alex Ross	14 rushes, 103 yards
Oklahoma	Receiving	Sterling Shepard	11 receptions, 183 yards, TD
Kansas	Passing	Ryan Willis	20/34, 181 yards, TD
Kansas	Rushing	Taylor Cox	12 rushes, 30 yards
Kansas	Receiving	Tyler Patrick	5 receptions, 46 yards, TD

=== At Texas ===
	1	2	3	4	Total
Jayhawks	7	7	0	6	20
Longhorns	17	7	14	21	59

Statistics	KU	TEX
First downs	23	20
Total yards	426	598
Rushing yards	192	299
Passing yards	234	299
Turnovers	4	1
Time of possession	32:23	27:37

Team	Category	Player	Statistics
Kansas	Passing	Ryan Willis	17/34, 214 yards, TD, 2 INT
Kansas	Rushing	Ke'aun Kinner	13 rushes, 67 yards
Kansas	Receiving	Darious Crowley	3 receptions, 63 yards, TD
Texas	Passing	Jerrod Heard	13/23, 201 yards, TD
Texas	Rushing	D'Onta Foreman	12 rushes, 157 yards, 2 TD
Texas	Receiving	John Burt	4 receptions, 113 yards, TD

=== At No. 15 TCU ===
	1	2	3	4	Total
Jayhawks	3	7	0	7	17
No. 15 Horned Frogs	10	0	3	10	23

Statistics	KU	TCU
First downs	13	25
Total yards	324	487
Rushing yards	121	279
Passing yards	203	208
Turnovers	1	1
Time of possession	26:11	33:49

Team	Category	Player	Statistics
Kansas	Passing	Ryan Willis	20/41, 203 yards, TD, INT
Kansas	Rushing	Ke'aun Kinner	17 rushes, 80 yards
Kansas	Receiving	Steven Sims	6 receptions, 55 yards
TCU	Passing	Bram Kohlhausen	13/19, 112 yards, INT
TCU	Rushing	Aaron Green	30 rushes, 177 yards
TCU	Receiving	Shaun Nixon	7 receptions, 78 yards, TD

=== West Virginia ===
	1	2	3	4	Total
Mountaineers	28	14	7	0	49
Jayhawks	0	0	0	0	0

Statistics	WVU	KU
First downs	30	10
Total yards	630	209
Rushing yards	426	82
Passing yards	204	127
Turnovers	2	4
Time of possession	33:00	27:00

Team	Category	Player	Statistics
West Virginia	Passing	Skyler Howard	13/22, 133 yards, TD, INT
West Virginia	Rushing	Skyler Howard	9 rushes, 129 yards, TD
West Virginia	Receiving	Jordan Thompson	6 receptions, 68 yards
Kansas	Passing	Ryan Willis	13/36, 127 yards, 2 INT
Kansas	Rushing	De'Andre Mann	4 rushes, 49 yards
Kansas	Receiving	Tre' Parmalee	5 receptions, 64 yards

=== Kansas State ===
	1	2	3	4	Total
Wildcats	28	7	3	7	45
Jayhawks	7	0	0	7	14

Statistics	KSU	KU
First downs	22	17
Total yards	363	315
Rushing yards	226	100
Passing yards	137	215
Turnovers	1	2
Time of possession	34:03	25:57

Team	Category	Player	Statistics
Kansas State	Passing	Joe Hubener	10/17, 133 yards
Kansas State	Rushing	Joe Hubener	17 rushes, 88 yards, 2 TD
Kansas State	Receiving	Winston Dimel	1 reception, 44 yards
Kansas	Passing	Ryan Willis	19/35, 215 yards, 2 TD, INT
Kansas	Rushing	Taylor Cox	11 rushes, 47 yards
Kansas	Receiving	Steven Sims	2 receptions, 58 yards

== Roster ==
2015 Kansas Jayhawks football roster
(Starters in bold)
**Quarterbacks**: 2 **Montell Cozart** – Jr.; 8 Keaton Perry – TR; 9 Carter Stanley – Fr.; 10 T. J. Millweard – (redshirt) Jr.; 13 Ryan Willis – Fr.; 15 Deondre Ford – Jr.; 14 Michael Cummings – (redshirt) Sr.; 18 Frankie Seurer – (redshirt) Jr.; **Running backs**: 22 **Ke'aun Kinner** – Jr.; 23 De'Andre Mann – Sr.; 24 Taylor Martin – Fr.; 25 J.J. Jolaoso – Jr.; 32 Reese Randall – (redshirt) Fr.; 33 Ryan Schadler – (redshirt) Fr.; 36 Taylor Cox – (redshirt) Sr.; 40 Preston Randall – (redshirt) Jr.; **Wide receivers**: 1 LaQuivionte Gonzales – TR; 3 Chase Harrell – Fr.; 4 Tyler Patrick – (redshirt) Fr.; 5 Bobby Hartzog – So.; 6 **Joshua Stanford** – Jr.; 7 Derrick Neal – So.; 11 **Tre' Parmalee** – Sr.; 12 Darious Crawley – So.; 16 **Steven Sims** – Fr.; 17 Quincy Perdue – So.; 20 Emmanuel Moore – Fr.; 26 Chris Bell – Fr.; 27 Luke Curtis – Fr.; 30 Seth Conway – Sr.; 80 Matt Hentges – (redshirt) Jr.; 82 Shakiem Barbiel – Sr.; 83 Jeremiah Booker – Fr.; 85 Austin Moses – Jr.; 88 Eric Rivers – Jr.; 89 DeAnte Ford – Fr.; **Tight ends**: 19 Jace Sternberger – Fr.; 49 Sebastian Sock – Fr.; 81 Kent Taylor – (redshirt) Jr.; 84 **Ben Johnson** – (redshirt) So.; 86 Brock Gilmore – Jr.	**Offensive line**: 55 Jacob Bragg – (redshirt) Fr.; 59 Jackson Jenkins – Fr.; 62 **D'Andre Banks** – Jr.; 63 Aaron Garza – Fr.; 64 Kyle Pullia – Jr.; 65 Jayson Rhodes – So.; 66 Hunter Saulsbury – Fr.; 68 Beau Lawrence – Fr.; 69 Mesa Ribordy – Fr.; 70 **Keyon Haughton** – Sr.; 71 Devon Williams – (redshirt) Jr.; 72 Will Smith – Jr.; 73 Larry Hughes – Fr.; 74 Clyde McCauley – Fr.; 76 **Bryan Peters** – (redshirt) Sr.; 77 Joe Gibson – (redshirt) So.; 78 **Larry Mazyck** – Sr.; 79 **Jordan Shelley-Smith** – (redshirt) Jr.; **Defensive line**: 10 **Ben Goodman** – (redshirt) Sr.; 13 **Damani Mosby** – (redshirt) Jr.; 17 Josh Ehambe – (redshirt) Fr.; 35 T.J. Semke – (redshirt) Sr.; 46 Dorance Armstrong – Fr.; 52 Mazin Aql – Fr.; 54 Jacky Dezir – So.; 56 Anthony Olobia – (redshirt) Jr.; 57 Taylor Stine – Fr.; 67 Ben Swanton – Fr.; 90 Kapil Fletcher – Sr.; 91 D.J. Williams – (redshirt) Fr.; 92 Timmy Hamilton – TR; 92 Lay'Trion Jones – (redshirt) Fr.; 94 Tyler Holmes – (redshirt) Jr.; 96 **Daniel Wise** – (redshirt) Fr.; 97 Kellen Ash – (redshirt) So.; 98 Jason Nix – TR; 99 **Corey King** – Sr.	**Linebackers**: 5 **Marcquis Roberts** – Jr.; 6 Kyron Watson – So.; 20 Keith Loneker Jr. – TR; 28 **Courtney Arnick** – (redshirt) Jr.; 29 Joe Dineen – So.; 31 Osaze Ogbebor – Fr.; 32 Schyler Miles – (redshirt) Jr.; 34 Aaron Plump – Sr.; 37 Beau Bell – Sr.; 40 Jacob Davis – Jr.; 41 Kendall Duckworth – Fr.; 44 Mike Zunica – (redshirt) Jr.; 49 Hudson Hall – Fr.; 59 Cameron Rosser – Jr.; **Cornerbacks**: 4 Shaquille Richmond – Fr.; 8 **Brandon Stewart** – Jr.; 19 **Tyrone Miller** – Fr.; 23 Ronnie Lewis – Sr.; 25 Marnez Ogletree – Jr.; 26 Colin Spencer – (redshirt) So.; 36 Chevy Graham – Jr.; 47 Nathan Miller – Fr.; **Safeties**: 9 **Fish Smithson** – Jr.; 16 Denzel Feaster – Fr.; 22 **Greg Allen** – (redshirt) Jr.; 24 Bazie Bates – Jr.; 30 **Tevin Shaw** – (redshirt) Jr.; 38 Hunter January – Fr.; 39 Michael Glatczak – Sr.; 43 Mason Ramirez – Fr.; **Special teams**: 7 **Matthew Wyman** – Sr. (K); 14 Nick Bartolotta – So. (K); 18 Eric Kahn – (redshirt) Sr. (K/P); 45 **Ruben Guzman** – Sr. (P); 64 Jordan Goldenberg – Jr. (LS); 68 **John Wirtel** – Jr. (LS)
