= Daniel Wise (gridiron football) =

American gridiron football player (born 1996)

- Wise with the Montreal Alouettes in 2026

No. 95 – Montreal Alouettes
- Position: Defensive tackle
- Roster status: Active
- CFL status: American

Personal information
- Born: January 16, 1996 (age 30); Carrollton, Texas, U.S.
- Listed height: 6 ft 3 in (1.91 m)
- Listed weight: 285 lb (129 kg)

Career information
- High school: Hebron (Carrollton)
- College: Kansas (2015–2018)
- NFL draft: 2019: undrafted

Career history
- Dallas Cowboys (2019)*; Arizona Cardinals (2020)*; Washington Football Team / Commanders (2021–2022); Kansas City Chiefs (2022–2023)*; Michigan Panthers (2024); Montreal Alouettes (2026–present)
- * Offseason or practice squad member only

Awards and highlights
- All-UFL Team (2024); 2× First-team All-Big 12 (2017, 2018); Second-team All-Big 12 (2016)

Career NFL statistics
- Total tackles: 11
- Stats at Pro Football Reference
- Stats at CFL.ca

Daniel Wise (born January 16, 1996) is an American professional football defensive tackle for the Montreal Alouettes of the Canadian Football League (CFL). He played college football for the Kansas Jayhawks and signed with the Dallas Cowboys as an undrafted free agent in 2019.

== Early life ==
Wise attended Hebron High School, where he was a starter at defensive tackle. As a junior, he tallied 77 tackles, one forced fumble and one fumble recovery. As a senior, he posted 49 tackles (33 solo), 5 sacks and 14 quarterback hurries.

== College career ==
Wise accepted a football scholarship from the University of Kansas. As a freshman, he appeared in 12 games (7 starts), while making 26 tackles (5.5 for loss), 3.5 sacks, one pass breakup and one blocked kick.

As a sophomore, he started 11 games at defensive tackle, totalling 38 tackles, 3 sacks, one pass breakup and 2 blocked kicks. He had 8 tackles and 4 tackles for loss against Ohio.

As a junior, he started at 12 games, registering 53 tackles, 7 sacks (led the team), 16 tackles for loss (led the team), 5 quarterback hurries, one pass breakup and one fumble recovery. He had 5 tackles and 4 tackles for loss against Southwest Missouri State.

As a senior, he started 11 games, recording 34 tackles, 5 sacks and 12.5 tackles for loss. He had 8 tackles (one for loss) against Nicholls. He made 5 tackles and 2 sacks against West Virginia. He had 5 tackles (3 for loss) and one sack against the Texas.

=== Statistics ===
College statistics
Year	Games	Tackles	For loss	Sacks	Int	PD
2015	8	17	6	4	0	1
2016	11	31	9	3	0	1
2017	12	33	16	5	0	0
2018	11	27	12	5	0	0
Career	42	108	43	17	0	2

== Professional career ==
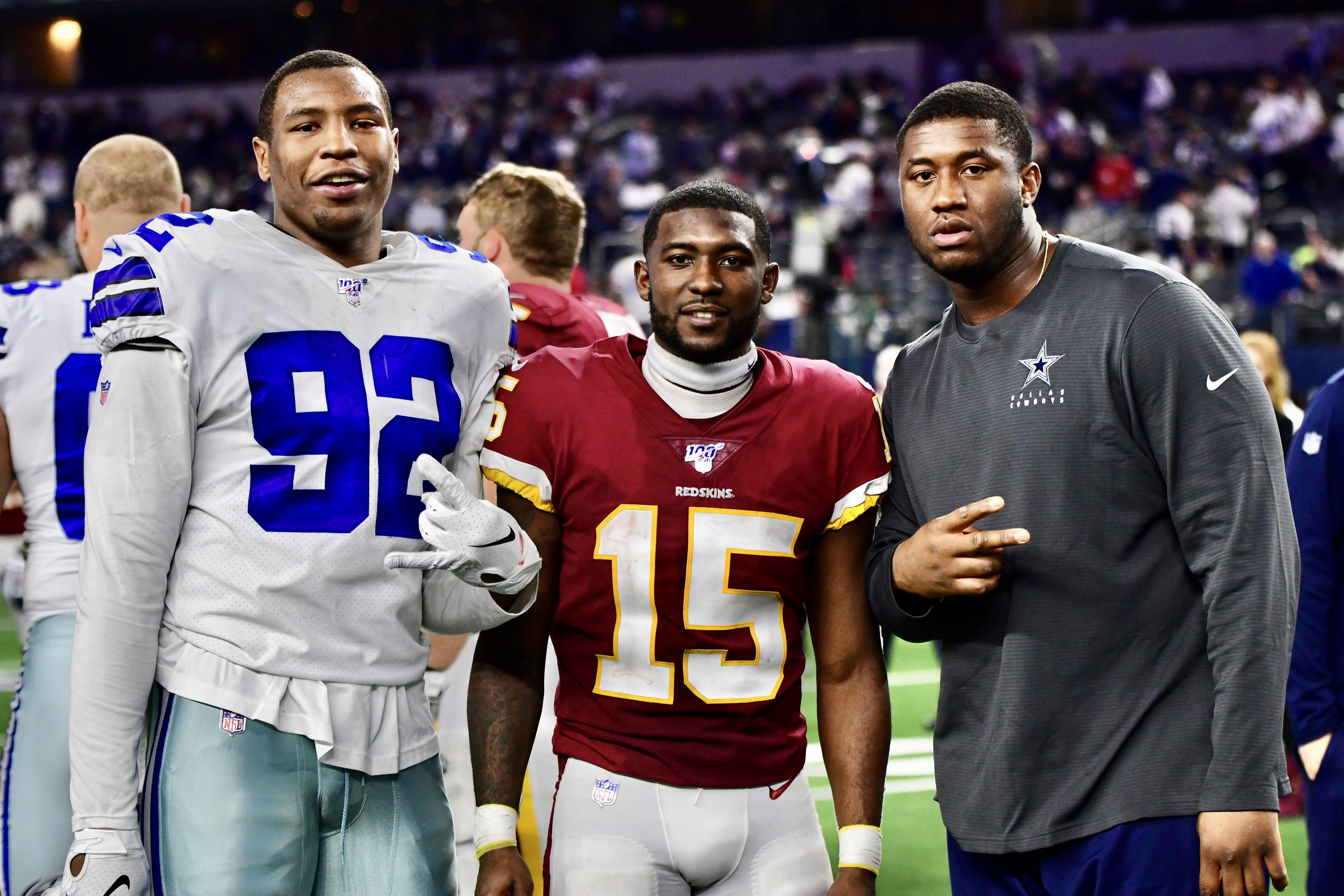
Wise (right) with former Kansas teammates, Dorance Armstrong (left) and Steven Sims (middle) in 2019.

Pre-draft measurables
Height	Weight	Arm length	Hand span	Wingspan	40-yard dash	10-yard split	20-yard split	20-yard shuttle	Three-cone drill	Vertical jump	Broad jump	Bench press
6 ft 2 5/8 in (1.90 m)	281 lb (127 kg)	33 in (0.84 m)	10 in (0.25 m)	6 ft 8 1/2 in (2.04 m)	5.20 s	1.77 s	3.00 s	4.37 s	7.53 s	27.5 in (0.70 m)	9 ft 4 in (2.84 m)	22 reps
All values from NFL Combine/Pro Day

=== Dallas Cowboys ===
Wise was signed by the Dallas Cowboys as an undrafted free agent after the 2019 NFL draft on April 30. He was waived on August 31, 2019, and was signed to the practice squad. On December 30, 2019, Wise was signed to a reserve/future contract. He was waived on March 18, 2020.

=== Arizona Cardinals ===
On October 28, 2020, Wise was signed to the Arizona Cardinals practice squad. He was released six days later.

=== Washington Football Team / Commanders ===
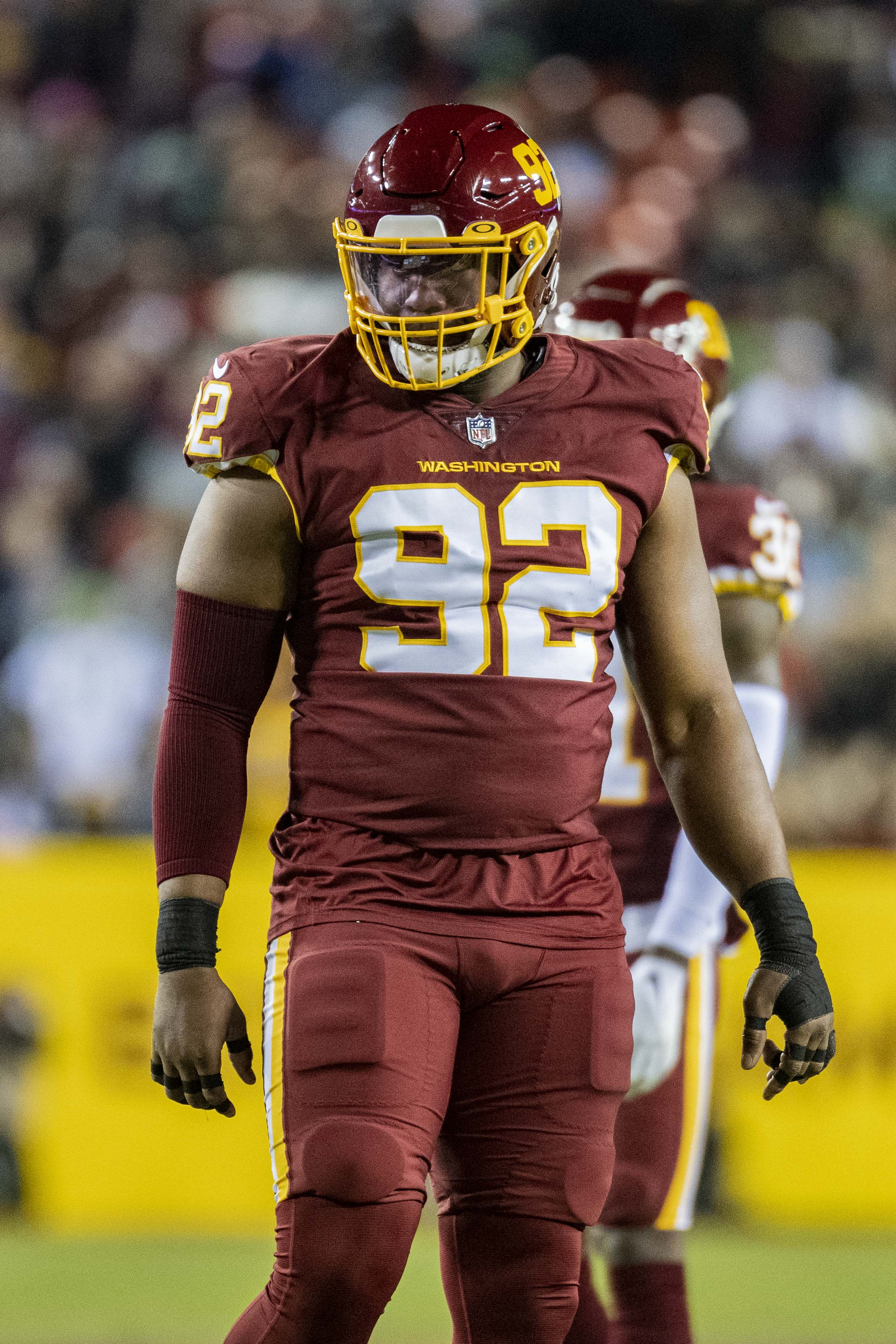
Wise in 2021

On January 12, 2021, Wise signed a reserve/futures contract with the Washington Football Team. He was released on August 31, 2021, but re-signed to the practice squad the following day. He was elevated to the active roster for the team's Week 3 game against the Buffalo Bills, and reverted back to the practice squad following the game. Washington signed Wise to their active roster on November 16, 2021. He suffered a knee injury in Week 15 and was placed on injured reserve on December 24.

Wise re-signed with the team on March 17, 2022. He played in 11 games before being waived on December 31, 2022.

=== Kansas City Chiefs ===
On January 4, 2023, Wise was signed to the Kansas City Chiefs practice squad. He was released on January 17. Wise was signed again on February 3, to a reserve/future contract. He was waived on August 29.

=== Michigan Panthers ===
On December 19, 2023, Wise signed with the Michigan Panthers of the United States Football League (USFL). He was placed on injured reserve on May 1, 2024. He was named to the 2024 All-UFL team on June 5, 2024. He was released on March 1, 2025.

=== Montreal Alouettes ===
On April 8, 2026, Wise signed with the Montreal Alouettes of the Canadian Football League (CFL) on a two-year contract.

== Personal life ==
Wise is the son of former Canadian Football League and Arena Football League player Deatrich Wise and the brother of Deatrich Wise Jr.
