= Jace Sternberger =

American football player (born 1996)

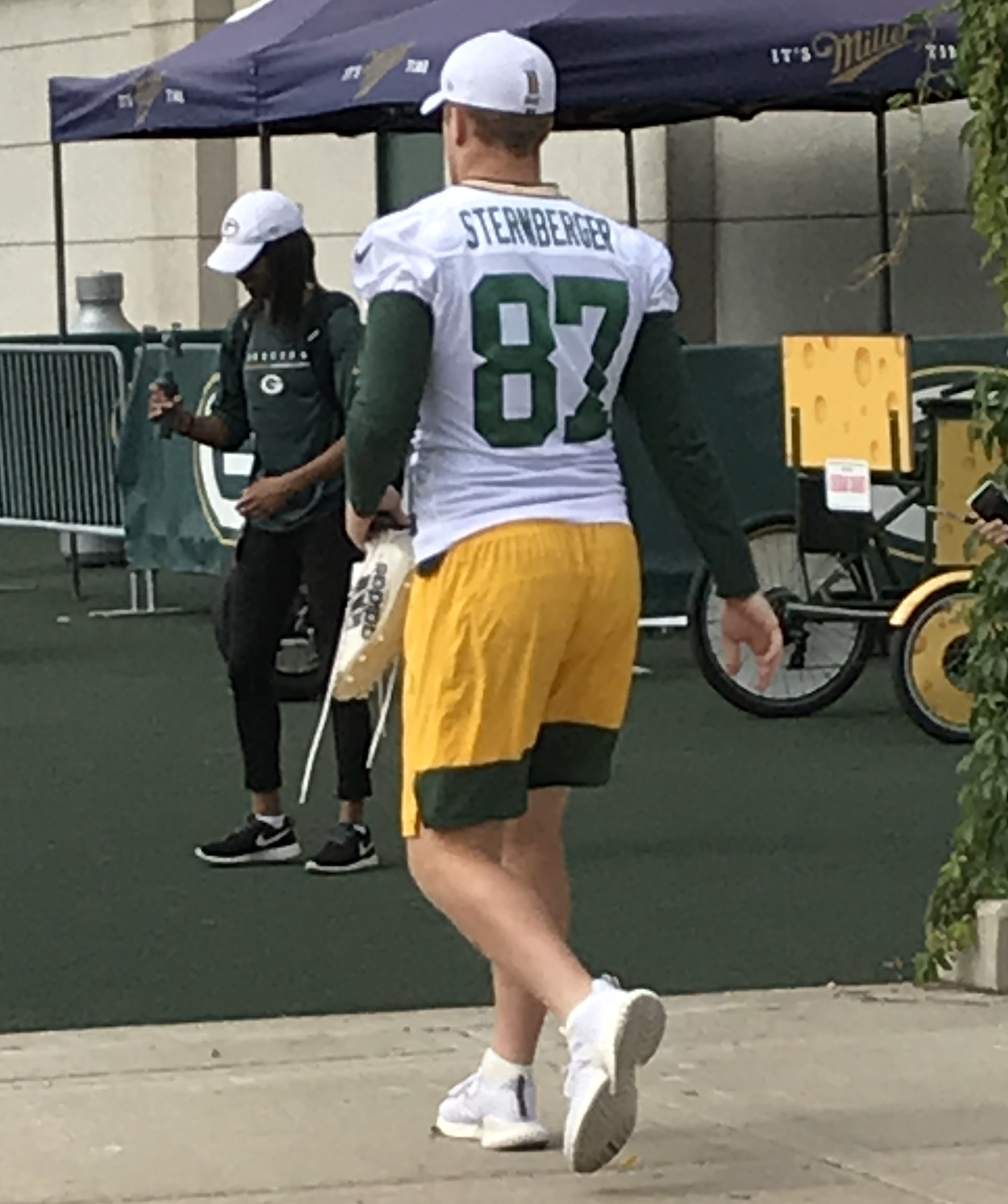
- Sternberger with the Green Bay Packers in 2019

No. 87, 12
- Position: Tight end

Personal information
- Born: June 26, 1996 (age 30); Kingfisher, Oklahoma, U.S.
- Listed height: 6 ft 4 in (1.93 m)
- Listed weight: 251 lb (114 kg)

Career information
- High school: Kingfisher
- College: Kansas (2015–2016); Northeastern Oklahoma A&M (2017); Texas A&M (2018)
- NFL draft: 2019: 3rd round, 75th overall pick

Career history
- Green Bay Packers (2019–2021); Seattle Seahawks (2021)*; Washington Football Team (2021); Pittsburgh Steelers (2021–2022)*; Birmingham Stallions (2023); Buffalo Bills (2023)*; Birmingham Stallions (2024–2025)
- * Offseason or practice squad member only

Awards and highlights
- UFL champion (2024); All-UFL Team (2024); USFL champion (2023); All-USFL Team (2023); USFL receiving touchdowns leader (2023); Consensus All-American (2018); First-Team All-SEC (2018)

Career NFL statistics
- Receptions: 12
- Receiving yards: 114
- Receiving touchdowns: 1
- Stats at Pro Football Reference

Jace Evan Sternberger (born June 26, 1996) is an American former professional football player who was a tight end in the National Football League (NFL). He played college football for the Northeastern Oklahoma A&M Golden Norsemen, Kansas Jayhawks, and Texas A&M Aggies, earning consensus All-American honors in 2018 with the latter. Sternberger was selected by the Green Bay Packers in the third round of the 2019 NFL draft. He was also a member of the Seattle Seahawks, Washington Football Team, Pittsburgh Steelers, and Buffalo Bills. He also played for the Birmingham Stallions of the United Football League (UFL).

== Early life ==
At Kingfisher High School in Kingfisher, Oklahoma, Sternberger played various positions in football, both offensive and defensive. He initially played quarterback. After a shoulder injury during his sophomore season, his coaches moved him to tight end. In basketball, Sternberger played power forward. His experience in basketball put him in a better position to excel at tight end in football. As a junior, Sternberger was part of the state championship team that compiled a 14–0 record. As a senior in 2014, he made 42 receptions for 390 yards and eight touchdowns.

Sternberger received scholarship offers from various colleges, including Texas State, Kansas, New Mexico, and Sam Houston State. He chose to enroll at Kansas as part of then-head coach David Beaty's first recruiting class.

== College career ==
During the 2015 season at Kansas, Sternberger took a redshirt.

As a redshirt freshman in 2016, Sternberger recorded only one reception for five yards over 10 games. He was second on the depth chart behind Ben Johnson, who recorded 10 receptions for 112 yards and a touchdown that season. Kansas' offensive scheme did not provide enough opportunities for Sternberger to showcase his skills. During the 2016 season, Kansas tight ends only amassed 11 receptions.

Due to the limited need of tight ends at Kansas and around the country, Sternberger transferred to Northeastern Oklahoma A&M. During the 2017 season, he had 21 receptions for 336 yards and six touchdowns. Due to his junior college performance, Sternberger was recruited by several programs, including Boise State and Florida State. He was ranked as the 53rd-best junior college player by Rivals.com. During his recruitment, then-Florida State head coach Jimbo Fisher accepted the same position at Texas A&M. Sternberger chose to commit to Texas A&M due to Fisher's tight end-heavy offense, wide receivers coach Dameyune Craig's recruiting, and the opportunity to play in the Southeastern Conference (SEC).

During the 2018 season, Sternberger received midseason All-America honors from CBS Sports, the Associated Press (AP), Sports Illustrated (SI), Athlon Sports, and ESPN. He was named one of eight semi-finalists for the John Mackey Award, given to the nation's top collegiate tight end. Sternberger was not selected as a finalist for the award, even though he had more touchdowns, receiving yards, and yards per reception than each of the three finalists. Despite not being selected as a Mackey Award finalist, Sternberger received first-team all-SEC honors and first-team All-America honors from the AP, Athlon, CBS, Football Writers Association of America (FWAA), Sporting News (SN), Sports Illustrated, and the Walter Camp Football Foundation (WCFF). He earned second-team All-American honors from USA Today. Since Sternberger was recognized by at least two of the five NCAA-recognized All-America team selectors (AP, AFCA, FWAA, SN, and the WCFF), he became a consensus All-American.

Following his lone season at A&M, Sternberger decided to forgo his final year of eligibility and declare for the 2019 NFL draft. He finished his career at A&M with 48 receptions for 832 yards and 10 touchdowns. Sternberger's 10 touchdowns match the school record for most touchdowns by a tight end, and his 832 receiving yards ranked second nationally among all tight ends for the 2018 season.

=== Statistics ===
Season	Team	Games		Receiving			
Season	Team	GP	GS	Rec	Yds	Avg	TD
2015	Kansas	0	0	Redshirt			
2016	Kansas	10	0	1	5	5.0	0
2017	NE Oklahoma A&M	12	—	21	336	16.0	6
2018	Texas A&M	13	12	48	832	17.3	10
Career		35	12	70	1,173	16.8	16

== Professional career ==
Pre-draft measurables
Height	Weight	Arm length	Hand span	40-yard dash	10-yard split	20-yard split	20-yard shuttle	Three-cone drill	Vertical jump	Broad jump	Bench press
6 ft 4 in (1.93 m)	251 lb (114 kg)	32 1/8 in (0.82 m)	9 3/4 in (0.25 m)	4.75 s	1.58 s	2.82 s	4.31 s	7.19 s	31.5 in (0.80 m)	9 ft 5 in (2.87 m)	17 reps
All values from NFL Combine

=== Green Bay Packers ===
Sternberger was drafted by the Green Bay Packers in the third round (75th overall) of the 2019 NFL Draft. On June 10, 2019, he signed his rookie contract.

On September 3, Sternberger was placed on injured reserve to start the season. He was designated for return from injured reserve and began practicing on October 16. Sternberger was activated off injured reserve on November 2. He scored his first NFL touchdown during the NFC Championship Game against the San Francisco 49ers on an eight-yard reception from Aaron Rodgers in the 37–20 loss.

Sternberger was placed on the reserve/COVID-19 list on July 30, 2020. He was activated on August 17.

Sternberger was suspended two games on June 10, 2021, after violating the NFL's substance-abuse policy. He was waived after returning from suspension on September 21.

=== Seattle Seahawks ===
Sternberger signed with the practice squad of the Seattle Seahawks on September 23, 2021.

=== Washington Football Team ===
Sternberger signed with the Washington Football Team on October 6, 2021. He was waived on November 2.

=== Pittsburgh Steelers ===
On November 23, 2021, Sternberger was signed to the Pittsburgh Steelers practice squad. He signed a reserve/future contract with the Steelers on January 18, 2022. He was waived on August 30.

On November 11, 2022, the Cleveland Browns hosted Sternberger for a workout.

=== Birmingham Stallions (first stint) ===
On January 26, 2023, Sternberger signed with the Birmingham Stallions of the United States Football League (USFL). On July 24, he was released from his contract to sign with an NFL team.

=== Buffalo Bills ===
On July 25, 2023, Sternberger signed with the Buffalo Bills. He was released on August 27.

=== Birmingham Stallions (second stint) ===
On November 20, 2023, Sternberger re-signed with the Stallions. He was named to the 2024 All-UFL team on June 5, 2024. He announced his retirement in December 2025, one of several players and coaches who ended their associations with the UFL ahead of a reorganization under incoming owner Mike Repole.

== Career statistics ==
Legend
	Led the league
	League champion
**Bold**	Career high

=== NFL ===
==== Regular season ====
Year	Team	GP	GS	Rec	Yds	Avg	Lng	TD	Fum	Lost
2019	GB	6	1	0	0	0.0	0	0	0	0
2020	GB	12	0	12	114	9.5	27	1	0	0
Total		18	1	12	114	9.5	27	1	0	0
Source: NFL.com

==== Postseason ====
Year	Team	GP	GS	Rec	Yds	Avg	Lng	TD	Fum	Lost
2019	GB	2	1	3	15	5.0	8	1	0	0
Total		2	1	3	15	5.0	8	1	0	0
Source: pro-football-reference.com

=== USFL/UFL statistics ===
==== Regular season ====
Year	Team	League	Games		Receiving				
Year	Team	League	GP	GS	Rec	Yds	Avg	Lng	TD
2023	BHAM	USFL	10	9	33	517	15.7	47	7
2024	BHAM	UFL	10	10	25	454	18.2	49	4
2025	BHAM	UFL	10	9	17	233	13.7	37	2
Career			30	28	75	1,204	16.1	49	13

==== Postseason ====
Year	Team	League	Games		Receiving				
Year	Team	League	GP	GS	Rec	Yds	Avg	Lng	TD
2023	BHAM	USFL	2	2	6	127	21.8	34	1
2024	BHAM	UFL	2	2	6	67	11.2	38	0
Career			4	4	12	194	16.2	38	1

== Personal life ==
Sternberger's parents, Jason and Jackie, were college athletes. Jackie was a basketball standout at Southwestern Oklahoma State University where she was a two time All-American. Sternberger lived in Clinton, Oklahoma, for a good part of his youth where he met his good friend who he considers a brother. Sternberger has a tattoo of him on his left arm in honor of a childhood friend, Alfonso Reynaga, who died of brain cancer at age 13. In November 2021, Sternberger welcomed a son with longtime girlfriend and model, Tayla Janae.
