= Jeff Long (athletic director) =

American athletic director

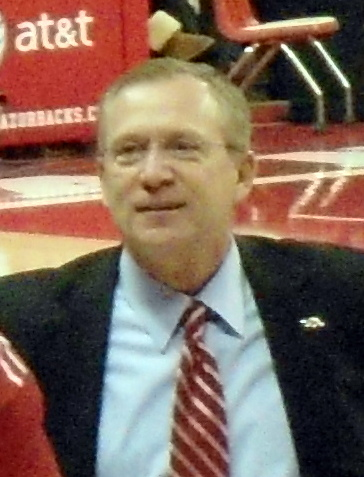

Biographical details
- Born: Kettering, Ohio, U.S.
- Education: Miami University (MEd)

Playing career
- 1978–1981: Ohio Wesleyan
- Position: Quarterback

Coaching career (HC unless noted)
- 1982: Miami (OH) (GA)
- 1983–1985: NC State (admin. assist. to HC)
- 1986: Duke (TE)
- 1987: Michigan (GA)

Administrative career (AD unless noted)
- 1988: Rice (assistant AD)
- 1988–1998: Michigan (assist./assoc. AD)
- 1998: Virginia Tech (assoc. AD)
- 1998–2001: Eastern Kentucky
- 2001–2002: Oklahoma (senior assoc. AD)
- 2003–2007: Pittsburgh
- 2008–2017: Arkansas
- 2018–2021: Kansas

Jeffrey Paul Long (born September 21, 1959) is an American athletics director, most recently at the University of Kansas. He is the former Vice Chancellor and director of athletics at the University of Arkansas and joined the University in 2008 after holding the same position at the University of Pittsburgh. Long's career in administration includes positions at the University of Oklahoma, University of Michigan, Virginia Tech, and Eastern Kentucky University.

== Education ==
In 1982, Long earned his bachelor's degree in economics from Ohio Wesleyan University and his master's degree in education from Miami University in 1983.

== Career ==
Long came to Arkansas as the successor of longtime athletic director Frank Broyles, who retired at the beginning of 2008. Prior to his term at Arkansas, Long was hired as Pittsburgh's athletic director after Steve Pederson left the University of Pittsburgh to take the same position at the University of Nebraska.

Long hired Head football coach Bobby Petrino in 2008, but fired him in April 2012 after Petrino lied about his relationship with former Arkansas volleyball player Jessica Dorrell, whom Long and Petrino had agreed to hire to a staff position within the football program. The affair came to light after Petrino attempted to cover up the fact that he had been riding with his mistress when he was involved in a motorcycle accident in April 2012. Long concluded that he could not allow Petrino to remain at Arkansas because Petrino had deceived both him and the public about the accident and his relationship with Dorrell. He was also angered that Petrino had secretly given Dorrell $20,000 as a Christmas present, which could have potentially exposed Arkansas to a sexual harassment suit had Petrino been retained. In his formal termination letter to Petrino, Long told him that he would have never greenlighted the hiring of Dorrell had Petrino disclosed their relationship. The firing of Bobby Petrino led to the subsequent tumultuous hiring of John L. Smith as interim head coach in 2012 and then the hiring of Bret Bielema the following year.

In October 2013, Long was announced as the first chairman of the College Football Playoff selection committee, along with twelve other members.

On November 15, 2017, the University of Arkansas announced that it had parted ways with Long effective immediately, with the school's chancellor saying Long had "lost the support of many of our fans, alumni, key supporters, and members of the university leadership."

In 2018, Long became athletic director at the University of Kansas, and vowed to break the cycle of losing football at the school, as the Jayhawks had not had a winning season since 2008. Long fired KU coach David Beaty and replaced him with former LSU coach Les Miles. The two had been friends since the late 1980s, when Miles was an assistant coach at Michigan and Long was an assistant athletic director.

Miles led KU to a 3–18 record over two seasons before being forced out due to a sexual harassment scandal dating back to his time at LSU. At a press conference on March 9, 2021–hours after Kansas and Miles agreed to part ways– Long said that Miles had assured him that there was nothing in his past "that could potentially embarrass the university or himself or our program." Long added that in February, he and other school officials had been alerted about "a legal dispute in Louisiana," but Miles had again assured him there was nothing to worry about. He claimed to have only learned about the allegations from the media. While Long was "beyond disappointed" that he had been forced to push Miles out, he believed it was "the right decision" under the circumstances."

The following day, it was announced that Long was leaving KU as well. Chancellor Douglas Girod said that he and Long had met on the previous night, and the two agreed that it was in the school's best interest for Long to step down. He had been roundly criticized for how he'd vetted Miles before hiring him. Long told CBS Sports' Dennis Dodd hours after meeting with Girod that his departure was not entirely voluntary, and confirmed he had been "relieved of his duties" but allowed to publicly save face by resigning.

== Personal life ==
Long is married to the former Fanny Gellrich of Ann Arbor, Michigan and the couple have two daughters.
