= Steven Sims =

American football player (born 1997)

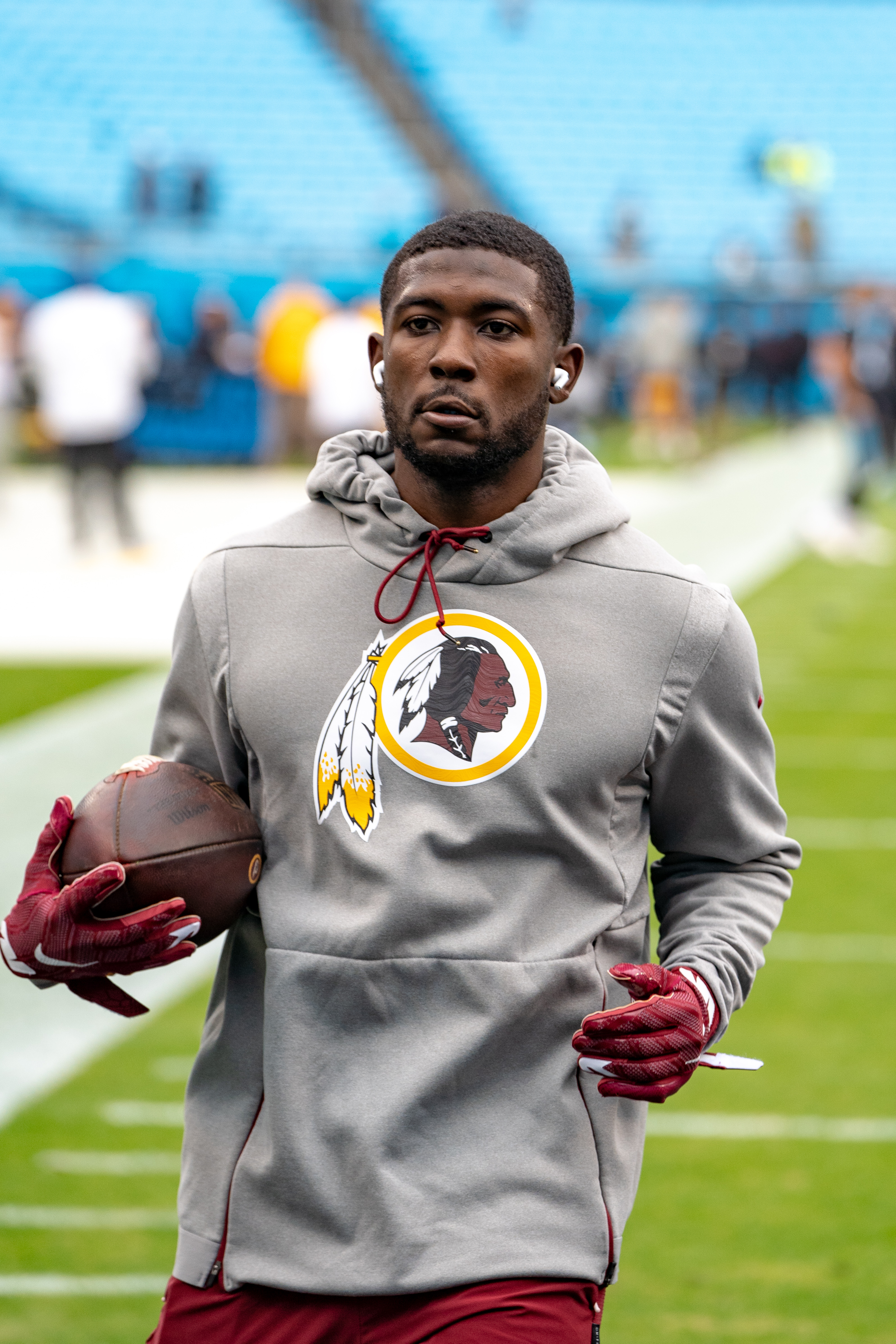
- Sims with the Washington Redskins in 2019

Profile
- Position: Wide receiver / Punt returner

Personal information
- Born: March 31, 1997 (age 29); Houston, Texas, U.S.
- Listed height: 5 ft 10 in (1.78 m)
- Listed weight: 190 lb (86 kg)

Career information
- High school: Travis (Pecan Grove, Texas)
- College: Kansas (2015–2018)
- NFL draft: 2019: undrafted

Career history
- Washington Redskins / Football Team (2019–2020); Buffalo Bills (2021)*; Pittsburgh Steelers (2021–2022); Houston Texans (2023–2024); Baltimore Ravens (2024); Seattle Seahawks (2025)*; Arizona Cardinals (2025)
- * Offseason or practice squad member only

Career NFL statistics as of 2025
- Receptions: 78
- Receiving yards: 704
- Return yards: 2,023
- Rushing yards: 174
- Total touchdowns: 7
- Stats at Pro Football Reference

Steven Sims Jr. (born March 31, 1997) is an American professional football wide receiver and punt returner. He played college football for the Kansas Jayhawks and signed with the Washington Redskins as an undrafted free agent in 2019.

== Early life and college ==
Sims attended and played high school football at Travis High School in Pecan Grove, Texas. A 2-star recruit, Sims committed to Kansas over offers from McNeese State, Prairie View A&M, Southeastern Louisiana, Southern, and Stephen F. Austin. He was a wide receiver, kick returner, and punt returner at the University of Kansas from 2015 to 2018.

=== Statistics ===
Year	Team	G	Rec	Yards	Avg	TD
2015	Kansas	11	30	349	11.6	2
2016	Kansas	12	72	859	11.9	7
2017	Kansas	11	59	839	14.2	6
2018	Kansas	12	53	535	10.1	4
Career		46	214	2,582	12.1	19

== Professional career ==
Pre-draft measurables
Height	Weight	Arm length	Hand span	40-yard dash	10-yard split	20-yard split	20-yard shuttle	Three-cone drill	Vertical jump	Broad jump	Bench press
5 ft 8 7/8 in (1.75 m)	184 lb (83 kg)	29 3/8 in (0.75 m)	8 5/8 in (0.22 m)	4.56 s	1.57 s	2.72 s	4.43 s	7.20 s	31.5 in (0.80 m)	9 ft 7 in (2.92 m)	11 reps
All values from Pro Day

=== Washington Redskins / Football Team ===
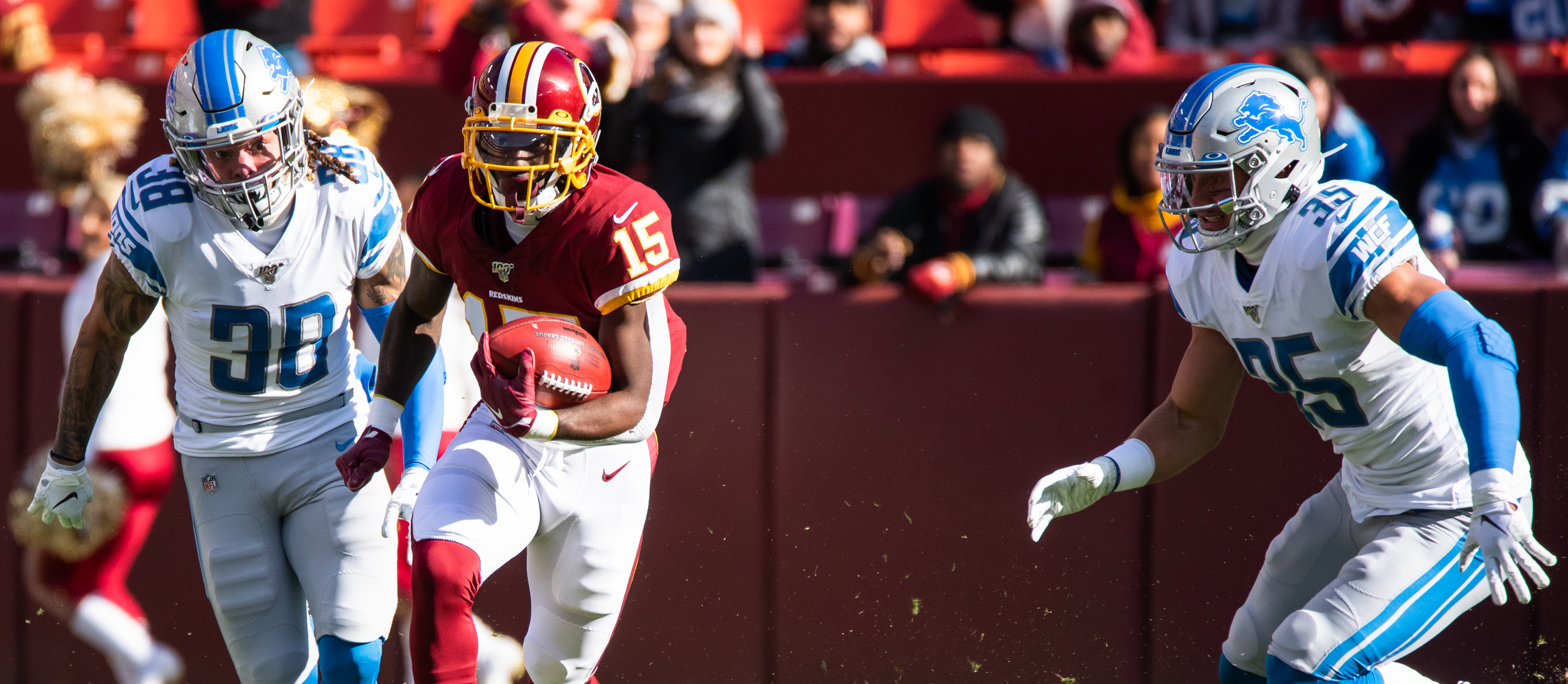
Sims (#15) in a game against the Detroit Lions as a rookie in 2019

Sims signed with the Washington Redskins as an undrafted free agent on April 30, 2019. He had his first career reception, a three-yard gain from Case Keenum, in a Week 2 loss to the Dallas Cowboys, along with three carries for sixteen yards. He had his first career touchdown, a 65-yard rushing touchdown, against the New England Patriots on October 6, 2019. In Week 12, he had his first kickoff return touchdown, for 91 yards, in a 19–16 win over the Detroit Lions, earning NFC Special Teams Player of the Week. In Week 16 against the New York Giants, Sims caught six passes for 64 yards and two touchdowns during the 41–35 overtime loss. Overall, Sims finished the 2019 season with 34 receptions for 310 receiving yards and four touchdowns.

He played the first three games of the 2020 season before being placed on injured reserve for a knee injury on October 9, 2020. He was activated off it on November 7. Sims played twelve games in the regular 2020 season and recorded 27 receptions for 265 yards and one touchdown. In his first playoff appearance, Sims caught three passes for 33 yards and recorded the only Washington receiving touchdown in the Wild Card Playoff game against the Tampa Bay Buccaneers. He was released on August 23, 2021.

=== Buffalo Bills ===
Sims signed with the Buffalo Bills on August 25, 2021, but was released on August 31 as part of the Bills' final cuts.

=== Pittsburgh Steelers ===
On September 1, 2021, Sims signed with the practice squad of the Pittsburgh Steelers. He signed a reserve/future contract with the Steelers on January 19, 2022.

During the 2022 season, Sims played in 12 games and recorded 14 receptions for 104 yards and 13 rushing attempts for 70 yards.

=== Houston Texans ===
On March 24, 2023, Sims signed with the Houston Texans. He was released on August 29, 2023 and re-signed to the practice squad. He was promoted to the active roster on January 16, 2024. In the Divisional Round against the Ravens in the playoffs, Sims returned a punt 67 yards for a touchdown in the 34–10 loss.

Sims re-signed with the Texans on March 21, 2024. He was released on December 20.

=== Baltimore Ravens ===
On December 23, 2024, Sims was claimed off waivers by the Baltimore Ravens.

=== Seattle Seahawks ===
On March 25, 2025, Sims signed with the Seattle Seahawks. On August 26, 2025, Sims was released by the Seahawks with an injury settlement as part of final roster cuts.

=== Arizona Cardinals ===
On December 9, 2025, Sims signed with the Arizona Cardinals' practice squad.
