= Doug Meacham =

American football player and coach (born 1964)

Biographical details
- Born: December 16, 1964 (age 61); Arlington, Texas, U.S.

Playing career
- 1983–1987: Oklahoma State
- Position: Offensive lineman

Coaching career (HC unless noted)
- 1988–1989: Northeastern Oklahoma A&M (GA)
- 1989–1991: Oklahoma State (GA/OL/LB)
- 1991–1996: Georgia Military (OC/OL)
- 1997–1999: Jacksonville State (OC/OL)
- 1999–2000: Henderson State (OC/OL)
- 2002–2004: Samford (OC/OL)
- 2005–2012: Oklahoma State (TE/IWR)
- 2013: Houston (OC/QB)
- 2014–2016: TCU (co-OC/IWR)
- 2017: Kansas (OC/WR)
- 2018: Kansas (OC/QB)
- 2020: TCU (WR/TE)
- 2021: TCU (OC/IWR/TE)
- 2022–2024: TCU (IWR)
- 2025: Oklahoma State (OC)
- 2025: Oklahoma State (interim HC)

Head coaching record
- Overall: 0–9

Accomplishments and honors

Awards
- Second-team All-Big Eight (1987)

Doug Meacham (born December 16, 1964) is an American football coach. He was most recently the interim head football coach at Oklahoma State University, where he played college football as an offensive lineman.

Meacham was hired by TCU to be their offensive coordinator on December 12, 2013. In his first year at TCU in 2014 he was a finalist for the Broyles Award.

Meacham was hired by David Beaty of the Kansas Jayhawks as the offensive coordinator on January 12, 2017. He was fired on October 10, 2018. In 2019, Meacham joined the St. Louis BattleHawks of the XFL as offensive coordinator. He resigned in January 2020 to become the inside wide receivers coach for TCU.

In December 2024, Meacham was hired as the offensive coordinator at his alma mater, Oklahoma State. Following the 1–2 start for Oklahoma State in 2025, Meacham was named interim head coach in place of Mike Gundy, who was released from his coaching duties on September 23. Meacham was not retained by newly hired head coach Eric Morris for the 2026 season.

== Head coaching record ==
Year	Team	Overall	Conference	Standing
Oklahoma State Cowboys (Big 12 Conference) (2025)
2025	Oklahoma State	0–9 (Note: Meacham replaced Mike Gundy after three games.)	0–9	16th
Oklahoma State:		0–9	0–9	
Total:		0–9		
