= Andre Patton =

American football player (born 1994)

No. 16
- Position: Wide receiver

Personal information
- Born: May 28, 1994 (age 32); Wilmington, Delaware, U.S.
- Listed height: 6 ft 2 in (1.88 m)
- Listed weight: 200 lb (91 kg)

Career information
- High school: St. Elizabeth (Wilmington)
- College: Rutgers
- NFL draft: 2017: undrafted

Career history
- Los Angeles Chargers (2017–2019); Arizona Cardinals (2020)*; Miami Dolphins (2020)*; Philadelphia Eagles (2021)*
- * Offseason or practice squad member only

Career NFL statistics
- Receptions: 6
- Receiving yards: 56
- Stats at Pro Football Reference

Andre Patton (born May 28, 1994) is an American former professional football player who was a wide receiver in the National Football League (NFL). He played college football for the Rutgers Scarlet Knights, and was signed by the Los Angeles Chargers as an undrafted free agent in 2017.

== Early life ==
Patton was a two-way starter for the St. Elizabeth Vikings football team. On offense, his senior year he had 48 catches for 761 yards and eight touchdowns and rushed for 677 yards and 14 touchdowns. On defense, Patton recorded 68 tackles and three interceptions and was named the Delaware Defensive Player of the Year by voting media and the Delaware Interscholastic Football Coaches Association. He was rated Delaware's top recruit Rivals.com, ESPN.com and 247Sports.

== College career ==
Patton saw game action in each of his four years at Rutgers. He finished his senior year with 33 receptions for 460, as well as 5 touchdown receptions, which lead the team and was good enough for ninth in the Big Ten.

== Professional career ==
Pre-draft measurables
Height	Weight	Arm length	Hand span	40-yard dash	10-yard split	20-yard split	20-yard shuttle	Three-cone drill	Vertical jump	Broad jump	Bench press
6 ft 2 3/8 in (1.89 m)	198 lb (90 kg)	31 7/8 in (0.81 m)	9 3/4 in (0.25 m)	4.40 s	1.68 s	2.65 s	4.12 s	7.36 s	35.5 in (0.90 m)	9 ft 10 in (3.00 m)	10 reps
All values from Rutgers Pro Day

=== Los Angeles Chargers ===
Patton was signed by the Los Angeles Chargers as an undrafted free agent on May 1, 2017. He was waived on September 2, 2017 and was signed to the Chargers' practice squad the next day. He signed a reserve/future contract with the Chargers on January 2, 2018.

On September 1, 2018, Patton was waived by the Chargers and was signed to the practice squad the next day. He signed a reserve/future contract with the Chargers on January 14, 2019.

On August 31, 2019, Patton was waived by the Chargers and signed to the practice squad the next day. He was promoted to the active roster on September 14, 2019, but was waived three days later and re-signed back to the practice squad. He was promoted back to the active roster on September 28, 2019.

Patton was waived on August 1, 2020.

=== Arizona Cardinals ===
On August 5, 2020, Patton signed with the Arizona Cardinals. He was waived during final roster cuts on September 5, 2020, and re-signed to the practice squad a day later. He was released on October 27.

=== Miami Dolphins ===
On November 18, 2020, Patton was signed to the Miami Dolphins' practice squad. He was released on December 14, 2020, and re-signed to the practice squad the next day. His practice squad contract with the team expired after the season on January 11, 2021.

=== Philadelphia Eagles ===
On July 29, 2021, the Philadelphia Eagles signed Patton to their roster. He was waived on August 31, 2021.
