= Montell Cozart =

American football player (born 1995)

No. 12
- Position: Quarterback

Personal information
- Born: August 11, 1995 (age 31); Kansas City, Missouri, U.S.
- Listed height: 6 ft 1 in (1.85 m)
- Listed weight: 207 lb (94 kg)

Career information
- High school: Bishop Miege (Roeland Park, Kansas)
- College: Kansas (2013–2016); Boise State (2017)
- NFL draft: 2018: undrafted

Career history

Playing
- Calgary Stampeders (2018–2020); Birmingham Stallions (2022); Houston Gamblers (2023); Southwest Kansas Storm (2025)*
- * Offseason or practice squad member only

Coaching
- Bishop Miege (KS) (2025–present) Quarterbacks

Awards and highlights
- Grey Cup champion (2018); USFL champion (2022)
- Stats at CFL.ca

Montell Cozart (born August 11, 1995) is an American former professional football quarterback. He attended Bishop Miege High School in Overland Park, Kansas, and played college football for the Kansas Jayhawks and Boise State Broncos. He played in the Canadian Football League (CFL) for the Calgary Stampeders from 2018 to 2020.

== Early life and college ==
Cozart earned first-team all-state honors after leading Bishop Miege High School to the Kansas Class 5A State Championship game in 2012. Cozart threw for 2,759 yards and 25 touchdowns as a senior at Bishop Miege High School, where he was coached by Jon Holmes.

Rated as a 3-star quarterback by Rivals.com, Cozart chose to attend the University of Kansas and join its football program over offers from Indiana, Kansas State, Minnesota, Northern Illinois and West Virginia. At Kansas, Cozart suffered a season-ending injury four games into his junior year; the NCAA granted Cozart an extra year of eligibility due to his injury. Cozart saw the most action in his fourth year with the Jayhawks, completing 112 of 190 pass attempts for 1,075 yards with 7 touchdowns and 9 interceptions. On February 21, 2017, Cozart announced he was leaving Kansas to seek a graduate transfer and would be eligible during the 2017 season. Cozart announced on May 4, 2017, that he will join the Boise State Broncos football team.

== Professional career ==
Pre-draft measurables
Height	Weight	Arm length	Hand span	40-yard dash	10-yard split	20-yard split	20-yard shuttle	Three-cone drill	Vertical jump	Broad jump
6 ft 1 3/8 in (1.86 m)	211 lb (96 kg)	32 in (0.81 m)	9 5/8 in (0.24 m)	4.67 s	1.62 s	2.73 s	4.24 s	6.95 s	34.0 in (0.86 m)	10 ft 0 in (3.05 m)
All values from Pro Day

=== Calgary Stampeders ===
Montell signed with the Calgary Stampeders of the Canadian Football League (CFL) on August 14, 2018. Cozart dressed for 21 games over his first two years in the league as a third-string quarterback, winning the 106th Grey Cup as a rookie. His lone statistic over this time was a single pass completion for 11 yards. After signing a one-year extension for 2020, the CFL season was subsequently cancelled due to the COVID-19 pandemic and Cozart was not re-signed and became a free agent.

=== Birmingham Stallions ===
On April 22, 2022, he signed with the Birmingham Stallions of the United States Football League. After one week on the active roster while Alex McGough was injured, Cozart was transferred to the inactive roster on May 6.

=== Houston Gamblers ===
Cozart was traded to the Houston Gamblers on December 31, 2022. He re-signed with the Gamblers on September 30, 2023. Following the season, Cozart was diagnosed with Guillain–Barré syndrome, a rare neurological condition which caused a rapid weight loss and required rehabilitation.

Cozart and all other Houston Gamblers players and coaches were all transferred to the Houston Roughnecks after it was announced that the Gamblers took on the identity of their XFL counterpart, the Roughnecks. He was not part of the roster after the 2024 UFL dispersal draft on January 15, 2024.

=== Southwest Kansas Storm ===
On January 24, 2025, Cozart signed with the Southwest Kansas Storm of Arena Football One.

== Coaching career ==
On March 24, 2025, Cozart agreed to return to Bishop Miege High School to serve as the team's quarterbacks coach.
