= Hakeem Adeniji =

American football player (born 1997)

No. 77, 78, 74, 75
- Position: Offensive tackle

Personal information
- Born: December 8, 1997 (age 28); Garland, Texas, U.S.
- Listed height: 6 ft 4 in (1.93 m)
- Listed weight: 302 lb (137 kg)

Career information
- High school: Garland
- College: Kansas (2016–2019)
- NFL draft: 2020: 6th round, 180th overall pick

Career history
- Cincinnati Bengals (2020–2022); Minnesota Vikings (2023); Cleveland Browns (2024); Dallas Cowboys (2025); Baltimore Ravens (2026)*
- * Offseason or practice squad member only

Awards and highlights
- First-team All-Big 12 (2019); Second-team All-Big 12 (2018)

Career NFL statistics
- Games played: 55
- Games started: 16
- Stats at Pro Football Reference

Hakeem Adeniji (born December 8, 1997) is an American former professional football player who was an offensive tackle in the National Football League (NFL). He played college football for the Kansas Jayhawks, earning first-team All-Big 12 honors in 2019 and second-team in 2018. He was selected by the Cincinnati Bengals in the sixth round of the 2020 NFL draft. He also played for the Minnesota Vikings and Dallas Cowboys.

== Early life ==
Adeniji attended high school at Garland High School in Texas. In high school, he had committed to play at the United States Air Force Academy. However, he failed to receive a medical waiver to attend due to an allergy to cashews. After failing to receive the waiver, he committed to the University of Kansas.

== College career ==
As a freshman, Adeniji became a starter at tackle immediately, starting all twelve games. Throughout his college career, Adeniji showed durability, not missing a single game due to injury. By the end of his senior year, he had been on the roster for 48 games and started in all of them. In his junior and senior years, he helped pave the way for running back Pooka Williams Jr. to rush for over 1,000 yards in back-to-back seasons. For his efforts, he was named 2nd team All-Big 12 Conference as a junior and 1st team as a senior.

== Professional career ==
=== Pre-draft ===
Adeniji was invited to the 2020 NFL Scouting Combine. Although he played tackle at Kansas, NFL Analyst Lance Zierlein said he believed Adeniji may have to move to guard in the NFL.

Pre-draft measurables
Height	Weight	Arm length	Hand span	Wingspan	40-yard dash	10-yard split	20-yard split	20-yard shuttle	Three-cone drill	Vertical jump	Broad jump	Bench press	Wonderlic
6 ft 4 3/8 in (1.94 m)	302 lb (137 kg)	33 3/4 in (0.86 m)	10 in (0.25 m)	6 ft 11 3/4 in (2.13 m)	5.17 s	1.78 s	2.98 s	5.08 s	8.32 s	34 in (0.86 m)	9 ft 7 in (2.92 m)	26 reps	34
All values from NFL Combine/Pro Day

=== Cincinnati Bengals ===
Adeniji was drafted by the Cincinnati Bengals with the 180th overall selection in the sixth round of the 2020 NFL draft. In week 8 of the 2020 season, he recorded his first career start at tackle. He helped the Bengals, who had allowed 28 sacks through 7 games, allow zero sacks in the game for the first time all season. He finished his rookie season with five starts and played in fifteen games.

Adeniji tore his pectoral muscle during offseason workouts and had season ending surgery to repair it in June 2021. He was placed on the reserve/non-football injury list following the preseason. He was activated on November 4, 2021. In his first game back from injury, he made his sixth career start against the Cleveland Browns. He finished the season starting in and playing in nine games. He also got the start for the Bengals in their postseason victory over the Las Vegas Raiders, which was the Bengals first playoff win in 31 years.

Adeniji began the 2022 season as the backup right tackle behind La'el Collins on the depth chart, he would be the team's swing tackle in all plays requiring six offensive linemen. Collins was injured in the Week 16 game against the New England Patriots, leading Adeniji to become the starting right tackle for the rest of the season and the playoffs. In the AFC Championship Game against the Kansas City Chiefs, the Bengals offensive line allowed three sacks, two of which from Chris Jones, the right side defensive end.

Adeniji was waived by the Bengals on August 29, 2023.

=== Minnesota Vikings ===
On August 31, 2023, Adeniji was signed to the practice squad of the Minnesota Vikings. On October 5, 2023, he was signed to the active roster.

=== Cleveland Browns ===
On March 13, 2024, Adeniji signed with the Cleveland Browns. He was placed on injured reserve on August 19.

=== Dallas Cowboys ===
On April 18, 2025, Adeniji signed with the Dallas Cowboys. He was released by Dallas during final roster cuts, but was re-signed to the team's active roster on August 27. He appeared in 12 games (one start) as a rotational swing tackle. In Week 5 against the New York Jets, he started at left guard in place of an injured Tyler Smith. He was declared inactive in 5 games.

=== Baltimore Ravens ===
On July 25, 2026, Adeniji signed a one-year contract with the Baltimore Ravens. On August 2, he made the surprising decision of retiring from professional football.

== Personal life ==
Adeniji married his fiancé Kayla in June 2021. On November 4, 2024, the couple released a statement via Instagram saying that their first son, Semiu Zade Adeniji, had been stillborn on November 2, 2024. "The fact that he is gone has set in now and nothing can change that," Adeniji wrote on Instagram on November 11, 2024. "I'll never get to see him grow up, and he'll never get to read his journal I wrote for him. I miss him and I'll miss him everyday for the rest of my life."
