= Rob Likens =

American football coach (born 1967)

Current position
- Title: Associate Head Coach, Co-Offensive Coordinator, and Wide Receivers Coach
- Team: SMU
- Conference: ACC

Biographical details
- Born: September 5, 1967 (age 59); Warren, Ohio, U.S.
- Education: Mississippi State University (BS); University of North Alabama (MA)

Playing career
- 1985–1990: Mississippi State
- Position: Wide receiver

Coaching career (HC unless noted)
- 1992: North Alabama (RB)
- 1993–1997: North Alabama (WR)
- 1998–2003: Temple (WR)
- 2004–2005: Southeast Missouri State (OC/QB/WR)
- 2006–2009: Central Connecticut (OC/QB)
- 2010–2012: Louisiana Tech (AHC/QB)
- 2013: California (AHC/OWR)
- 2014: California (AHC/PGC/OWR)
- 2015–2016: Kansas (OC/QB)
- 2017: Arizona State (PGC/WR)
- 2018–2019: Arizona State (OC/QB)
- 2020: Miami (FL) (WR)
- 2021: Miami (FL) (PGC/WR)
- 2022–present: SMU (AHC/Co-OC/WR)

Rob Likens (born September 5, 1967) is an American football coach who is currently the wide receivers coach and co-offensive coordinator at Southern Methodist University. He is the former offensive coordinator and quarterbacks coach at Arizona State University.

Likens was born in Warren, Ohio and attended Mississippi State University. He began his coaching career in 1992, joining the North Alabama Lions as running backs coach. He switched to coaching North Alabama's wide receivers coach in 1993.

He left North Alabama in 1998, joining the Temple Owls as a wide receivers coach.

He left Temple in 2004, accepting a job as wide receivers coach, quarterbacks coach, and offensive coordinator for the Southeast Missouri State Redhawks. He was there until 2005, leaving to join the Central Connecticut State Blue Devils as offensive coordinator and quarterbacks coach.

He left Central Connecticut in 2009 when he was hired by Louisiana Tech Bulldogs as assistant head coach and quarterbacks coach. He followed Sonny Dykes to the California Golden Bears as an assistant head coach and outside receivers coach.

In 2014, he was named passing game coordinator. He then accepted a job offer as the offensive coordinator for the Kansas Jayhawks. He was at Kansas for two seasons before accepting a position with Arizona State Sun Devils as wide receivers coach and passing game coordinator. In 2018, he was promoted to offensive coordinator and quarterbacks coach. While at Arizona State he recruited Jayden Daniels to the Sun Devils.

In December 2019, he left Arizona State to join University of Miami as the wide receivers coach.

In December 2021, he left Miami to join SMU as the assistant to head coach and wide receivers coach .
