= Dorance Armstrong =

American football player (born 1997)

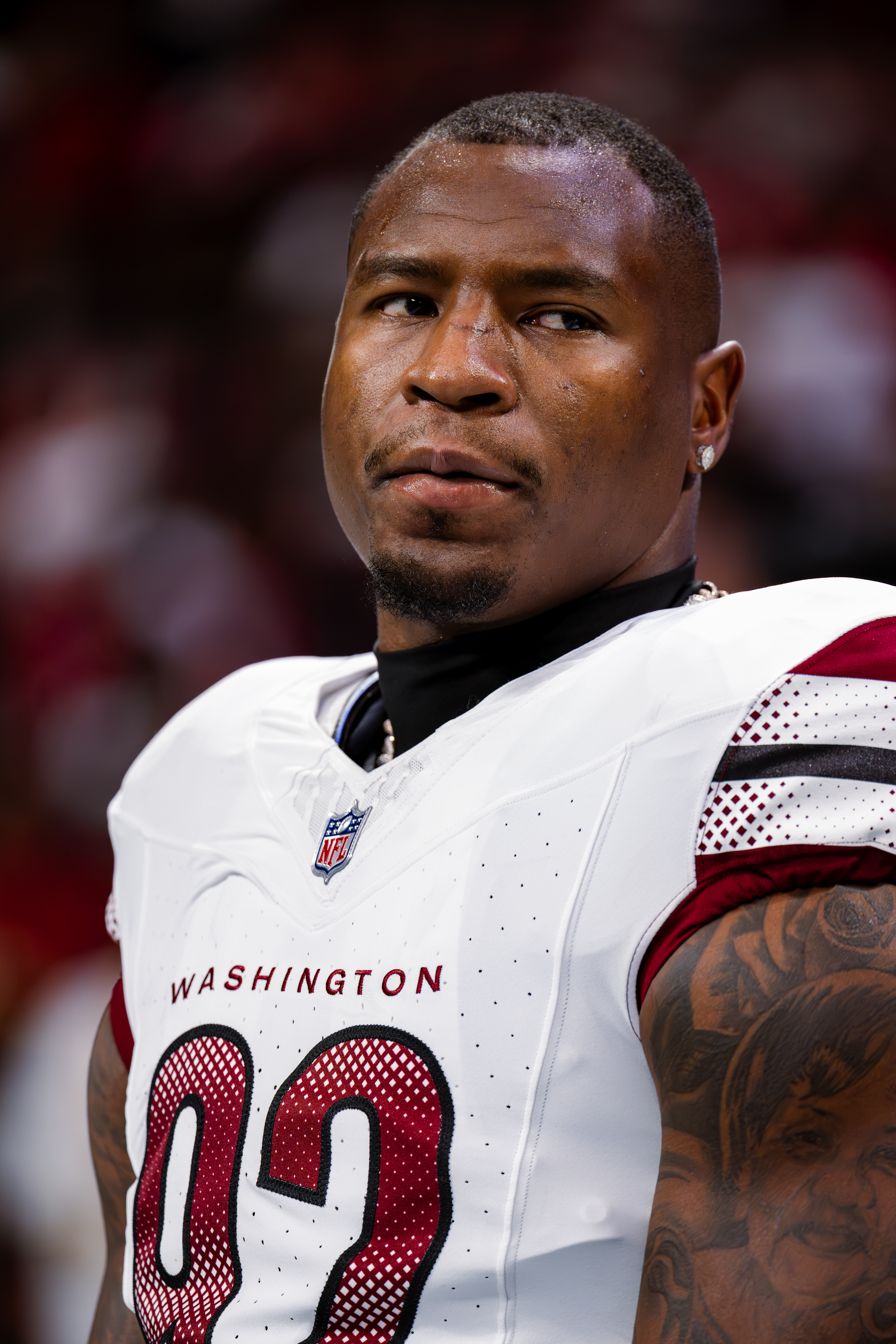
- Armstrong with the Washington Commanders in 2025

No. 92 – Washington Commanders
- Position: Outside linebacker
- Roster status: Active

Personal information
- Born: June 10, 1997 (age 29); Houston, Texas, U.S.
- Listed height: 6 ft 4 in (1.93 m)
- Listed weight: 255 lb (116 kg)

Career information
- High school: North Shore (Houston)
- College: Kansas (2015–2017)
- NFL draft: 2018: 4th round, 116th overall pick

Career history
- Dallas Cowboys (2018–2023); Washington Commanders (2024–present)

Awards and highlights
- First-team All-Big 12 (2016); Second-team All-Big 12 (2017)

Career NFL statistics as of Week 10, 2026
- Tackles: 251
- Sacks: 35.0
- Forced fumbles: 6
- Fumble recoveries: 5
- Pass deflections: 5
- Touchdowns: 1
- Stats at Pro Football Reference

Dorance Armstrong Jr. (born June 10, 1997) is an American professional football outside linebacker for the Washington Commanders of the National Football League (NFL). He played college football for the Kansas Jayhawks and was selected by the Dallas Cowboys in the fourth round of the 2018 NFL draft.

== Early life ==
Armstrong attended North Shore Senior High School, Galena Park ISD in Houston, Texas, where he played defensive end. As a junior, he was named second-team All-District. As a senior, he received first-team All-district honors. He also played basketball.

== College career ==
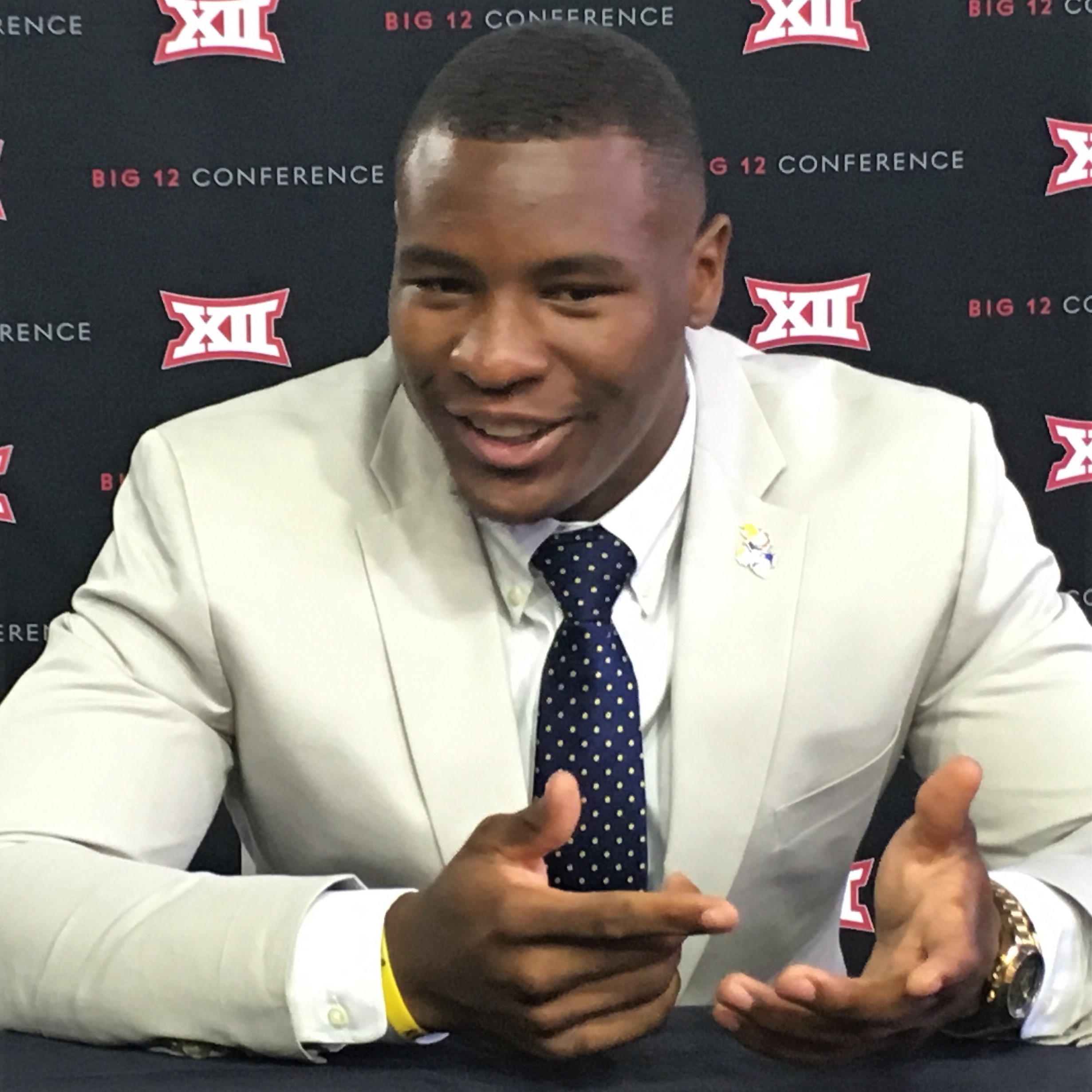
Armstrong in 2017

A 3-star defensive end recruit, Armstrong accepted a football scholarship from the University of Kansas, committing to Kansas over offers from California, Indiana, Iowa State, Michigan State, Purdue, and Texas Tech, among others. As a freshman, he appeared in all 12 games and started the last 5 contests at defensive end. He registered 23 tackles, 5 tackles for loss, 3.5 sacks (second on the team), and 4 passes defensed (second on the team).

As a sophomore, he had a breakout season as the starter at left defensive end. He led the team and was second in the conference with 10 sacks, the most by a school player since 2008. He posted 56 tackles (fifth on the team), 20 tackles for loss (fifth in school history), 5 quarterback hurries, 3 forced fumbles, and 2 fumbles recoveries. He had a career-high 11 tackles (3 for loss), 2 sacks, one forced fumble, and one fumble recovery against the University of Texas.

As a junior, his role in the defense changed and his production regressed. He made 63 total tackles (third on the team), 9 tackles for loss, 1.5 sacks, 7 quarterback hurries, 4 passes defensed, 3 forced fumbles, and one fumble recovery. On January 3, 2018, he announced that he would forgo his senior year to enter the 2018 NFL draft. He finished his career with 142 tackles and 15.5 sacks.

== Professional career ==
Pre-draft measurables
Height	Weight	Arm length	Hand span	Wingspan	40-yard dash	10-yard split	20-yard split	20-yard shuttle	Three-cone drill	Vertical jump	Broad jump	Bench press
6 ft 3 5/8 in (1.92 m)	257 lb (117 kg)	34 3/4 in (0.88 m)	10 in (0.25 m)	6 ft 11 in (2.11 m)	4.87 s	1.69 s	2.85 s	4.23 s	7.12 s	33.0 in (0.84 m)	9 ft 10 in (3.00 m)	25 reps
All values from NFL Combine/Pro Day

=== Dallas Cowboys ===
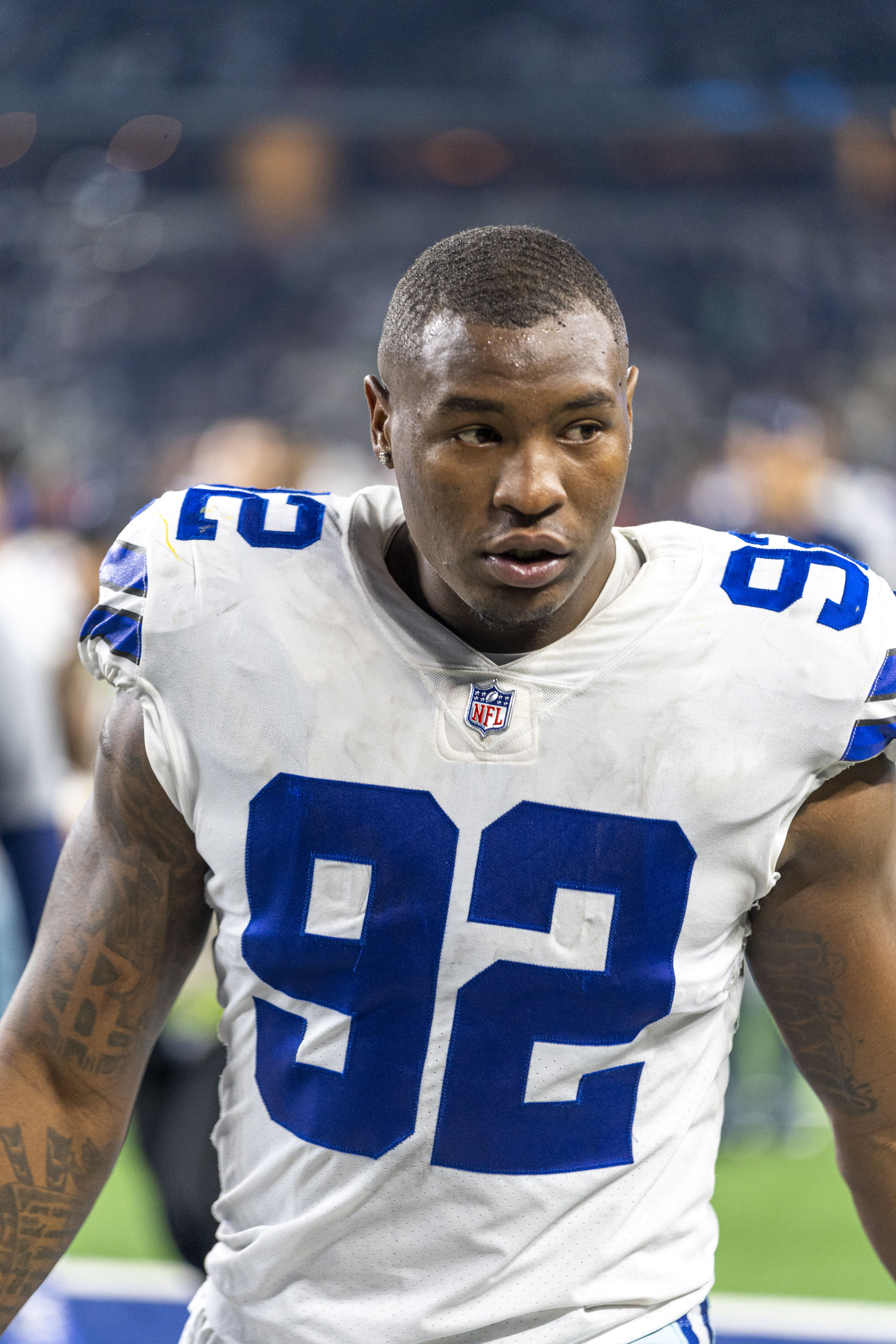
Armstrong with the Dallas Cowboys in 2021

Armstrong was selected by the Dallas Cowboys in the fourth round (116th overall) of the 2018 NFL draft. Armstrong made his first career start on October 14, 2018 against the Jacksonville Jaguars. He recorded his first career sack on November 5, in a game against the Tennessee Titans, a sack he split with Caraun Reid. Entering the league as a 21-year-old rookie, he finished the season with 13 tackles, 8 solo, and a half of a sack, while playing in fifteen of the Cowboys sixteen games (one start).

In 2019, he appeared in 15 games with no starts. He tallied 16 tackles, 2 sacks, 9 quarterback pressures, one forced fumble and 2 special teams tackles. He recorded the first full sack of his career against the Green Bay Packers. He had his first career forced fumble against the New York Giants. He had 5 tackles against the Minnesota Vikings.

In 2020, he appeared in 16 games with 2 starts. He registered 33 tackles (one for loss), 9 quarterback pressures, 2 pass breakups, 2 fumble recoveries and 3 special teams tackles. He had 5 tackles against the Vikings. He made 3 defensive tackles, along with one tackle, a forced fumble and a recovered fumble on special teams against the San Francisco 49ers.

In 2021, He appeared in 13 games with five starts, collecting 37 tackles, 5 sacks (third on the team), 22 quarterback pressures (fourth on the team), 2 pass breakups and one fumble recovery that he returned 37 yards for a touchdown. He missed 4 games with a high ankle sprain injury. In Week 2 against the Los Angeles Chargers, he started in place of defensive end Randy Gregory, who was placed on the Reserve/COVID-19 list. In Week 10 against the Atlanta Falcons, he started in place of an injured Gregory, making 3 tackles, one sack, 3 quarterback hurries and one block punt. In the thirteenth game against the Washington Redskins, he had six tackles and returned a fumble recovery 37 yards.

On March 17, 2022, Armstrong signed a two-year contract extension with the Cowboys. He appeared in 17 games with five starts, registering 28 tackles (2 for loss), 8.5 sacks (second on the team), 25 quarterback pressures (fourth on the team), 2 fumble recoveries and 2 blocked kicks. He continued to replace Gregory in the starting lineup at right defensive end. He had 2 sacks against the Cincinnati Bengals. He blocked a field goal attempt (against the Giants and a punt (against the Los Angeles Rams), becoming the sixth in franchise history with multiple blocked punts in his career.

In 2023, he appeared in all 17 games (one start), tallying 28 tackles (7 for loss), 7.5 sacks (second on the team) and 12 quarterback pressures. He had 3 tackles for loss and 2 sacks in the season opener against the Giants.

=== Washington Commanders ===
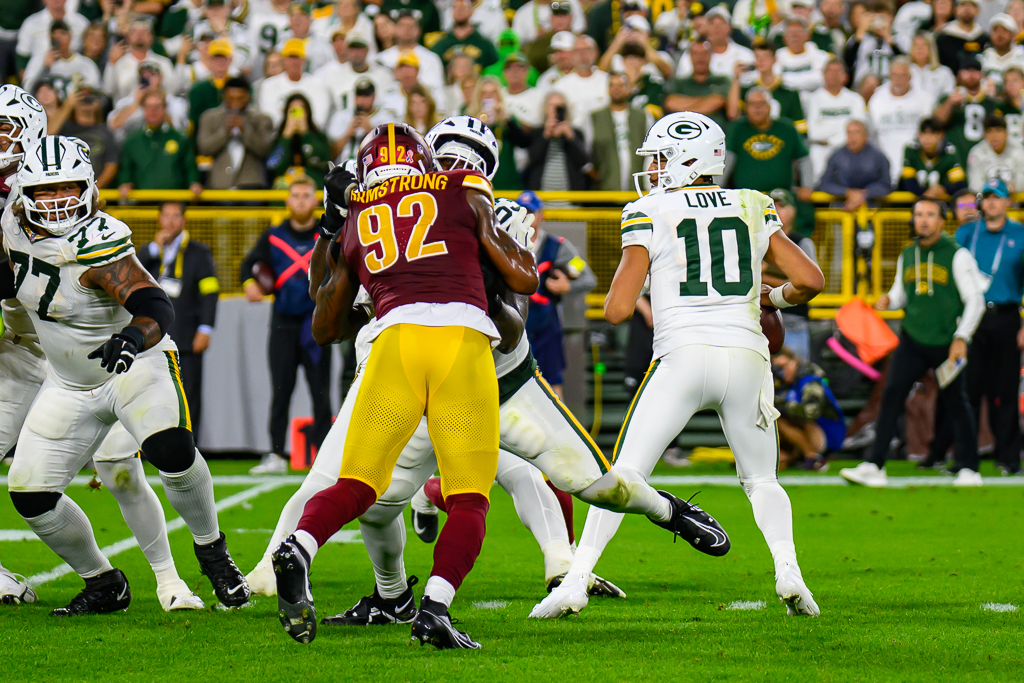
Armstrong in 2025 with the Washington Commanders playing against the Green Bay Packers

On March 14, 2024, Armstrong signed a three-year contract with a maximum value of $45 million with the Washington Commanders. He reunited with head coach Dan Quinn, who was his defensive coordinator with the Dallas Cowboys and personally called Armstrong to join him in Washington. Armstrong finished the 2024 regular season with 39 tackles, five sacks, two forced fumbles, and one pass deflections over 16 games.

Armstrong made seven appearances (five starts) for the Commanders in 2025, recording 5.5 sacks and 24 combined tackles. He was placed on injured reserve due to a season-ending knee injury on October 21, 2025.

During the 2026 preseason, Armstrong switched from defensive end to outside linebacker in the new defensive scheme implemented by Daronte Jones. On August 14, 2026, the NFL issued Armstrong a one-game suspension for violating the league's personal conduct policy due to a May 2025 arrest in Frisco, Texas on misdemeanor charges of assault and resisting arrest.

== Career statistics ==
=== NFL ===
==== Regular season ====
Year	Team	Games		Tackles				Fumbles				Interceptions			
Year	Team	GP	GS	Cmb	Solo	Ast	Sck	FF	FR	Yds	TD	Int	Yds	TD	PD
2018	DAL	15	1	13	8	5	0.5	0	0	0	0	0	0	0	0
2019	DAL	15	0	15	12	3	2	1	0	0	0	0	0	0	0
2020	DAL	16	2	33	21	12	0	1	2	0	0	0	0	0	2
2021	DAL	13	5	37	23	14	5	0	1	37	1	0	0	0	1
2022	DAL	17	5	33	17	16	8.5	1	2	1	0	0	0	0	0
2023	DAL	17	1	38	20	18	7.5	0	0	0	0	0	0	0	1
2024	WAS	16	15	39	20	19	5	2	0	0	0	0	0	0	1
2025	WAS	7	5	24	16	8	5.5	0	0	0	0	0	0	0	0
2026	WAS	8	0	19	10	9	1.0	1	0	0	0	0	0	0	0
Career		124	34	251	147	104	35.0	6	5	38	1	0	0	0	5

==== Postseason ====
Year	Team	Games		Tackles				Fumbles				Interceptions			
Year	Team	GP	GS	Cmb	Solo	Ast	Sck	FF	FR	Yds	TD	Int	Yds	TD	PD
2021	DAL	1	0	4	3	1	0	0	0	0	0	0	0	0	1
2022	DAL	2	0	5	4	1	0	0	0	0	0	0	0	0	0
Career		3	0	9	7	2	0	0	0	0	0	0	0	0	1

=== College ===
College statistics
Year	GP	Tackles	For Loss	Sacks	FF	PD
2015	9	23	5	3.5	0	4
2016	12	56	20	10	3	0
2017	12	63	9.5	2	3	4
Career	33	142	34.5	15.5	6	8
