= Kenny Perry (American football) =

American football coach

Current position
- Title: Associate head coach, special teams coordinator, & running backs coach
- Team: Texas Tech
- Conference: Big 12

Playing career
- 1988–1991: Houston
- Position: Defensive back

Coaching career (HC unless noted)
- 1992–1994: Houston (GA)
- 2000–2003: Sam Houston HS (TX)
- 2004–2005: Haltom HS (TX)
- 2006–2012: Bowie HS (TX)
- 2013: TCU (RC)
- 2014: TCU (CB)
- 2015–2016: Kansas (co-DC/CB)
- 2017–2018: Kansas (ST/RC)
- 2020: Dallas Renegades (DB)
- 2021: SMU (ST/DB)
- 2022–present: Texas Tech (assoc. HC/ST/RB)

Head coaching record
- Overall: 96–57

Kenneth Perry is an American college football coach. He is the associate head football coach, special teams coordinator, and running backs coach for Texas Tech University, positions he has held since 2022. He was the head football coach for Sam Houston High School from 2000 to 2003, Haltom High School from 2004 to 2005, and Bowie High School from 2006 to 2012. He also coached for TCU, Kansas, SMU, and the Dallas Renegades—now known as the Arlington Renegades—of the XFL.

== Coaching career ==
Perry began his head coaching career at Sam Houston High School in Arlington, Texas in 2000. After coaching there for 3 years, he left to coach at Haltom City in 2004. He coached the Buffs for two years before leaving for Arlington Bowie in 2006. He found his most success here, going 67–22 and earning a spot in the Class 5-A Texas High School Playoffs each year as head coach.

After a seven-year run with the Volunteers, Perry took the recruiting coach position and director of high school relations at TCU in 2013. In 2014, he became the cornerbacks coach for the Horned Frogs.

In January 2015, Perry was hired as the co-defensive coordinator and cornerbacks coach for the Kansas Jayhawks. Beginning in the 2017 season, Perry transitioned to recruiting/special teams coordinator.

Perry joined the XFL's Dallas Renegades as defensive backs coach in 2019.

On May 5, 2021, Perry was hired by SMU to be their special teams coach under head coach Sonny Dykes.

On November 29, 2021, Perry was hired by Texas Tech to be their special teams and running backs coach under head coach Joey McGuire.
