= Fish Smithson =

American football player (born 1994)

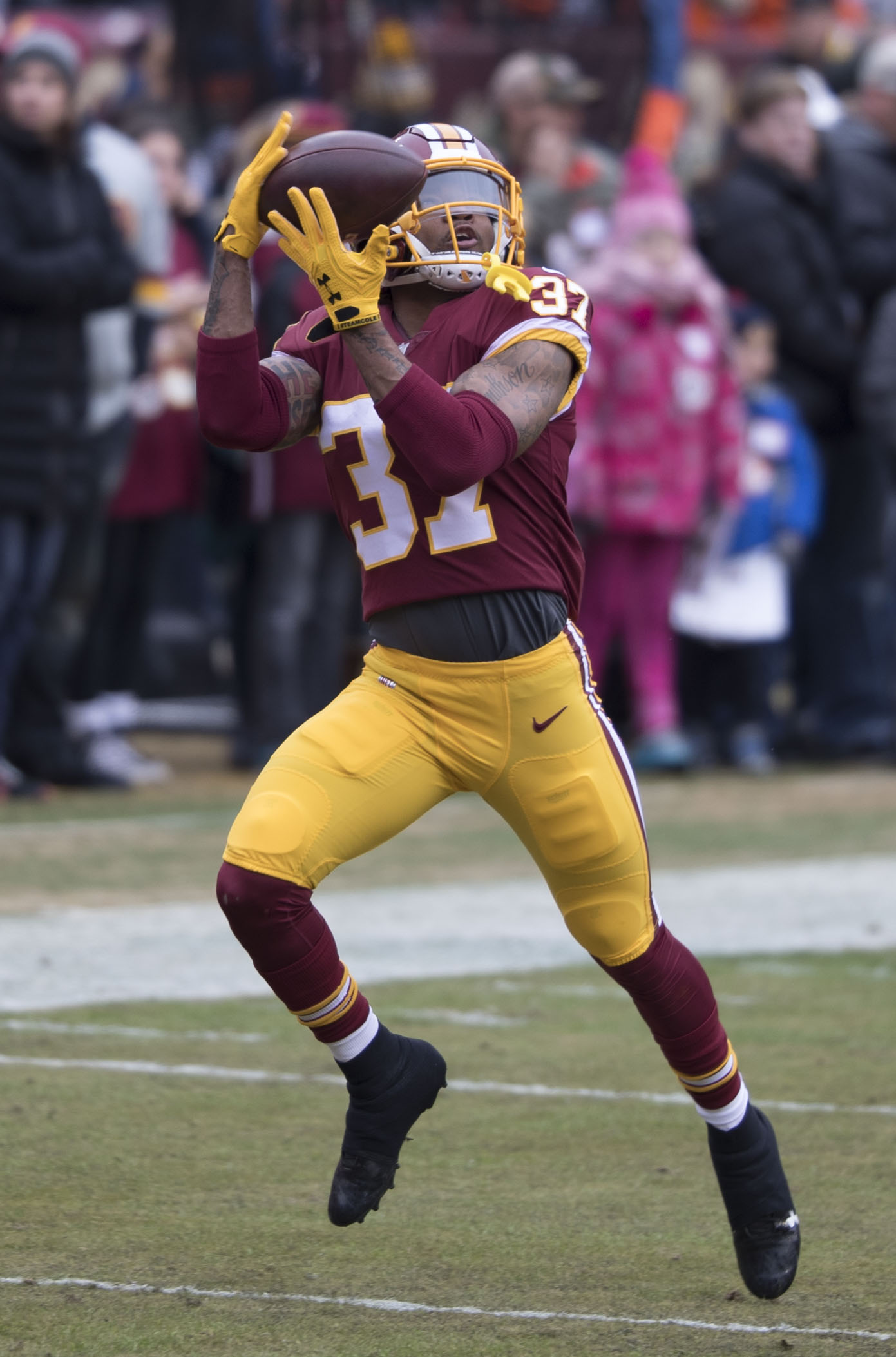
- Smithson with the Washington Redskins in 2017

No. 37, 46
- Position: Safety

Personal information
- Born: March 18, 1994 (age 32); Baltimore, Maryland, U.S.
- Listed height: 5 ft 11 in (1.80 m)
- Listed weight: 196 lb (89 kg)

Career information
- High school: Highland (Salt Lake City, Utah)
- College: Kansas
- NFL draft: 2017: undrafted

Career history
- Washington Redskins (2017); Arizona Cardinals (2018)*; Los Angeles Chargers (2018)*; Jacksonville Jaguars (2019)*; Baltimore Ravens (2019)
- * Offseason or practice squad member only

Awards and highlights
- First-team All-Big 12 (2016); Second-team All-Big 12 (2015)

Career NFL statistics
- Total tackles: 1
- Stats at Pro Football Reference

Anthony "Fish" Smithson (born March 18, 1994) is an American former professional football player who was a safety in the National Football League (NFL). He played college football for the Kansas Jayhawks and was signed by the Washington Redskins as an undrafted free agent in 2017. He also played for the Baltimore Ravens.

== College career ==
=== Hartnell ===
Smithson initially committed to play at Hartnell College out of high school where he played his freshman year.

=== Kansas ===
Following his freshman year at Hartnell, he transferred to the University of Kansas. In 2015, he led the nation in solo tackles, which led to him being named second-team All-Big 12. In 2016 he was named first-team All-Big 12.

== Professional career ==
=== Washington Redskins ===
After going undrafted in the 2017 NFL draft, Smithson signed with the Washington Redskins as an undrafted free agent. He was waived on September 2, 2017, during roster cutdowns. The following day, Smithson was re-signed to the Redskins' practice squad. He was elevated to the active roster on December 19.

On September 1, 2018, Smithson was waived by the Redskins as a part of final roster cuts before the start of the regular season.

=== Arizona Cardinals ===
On December 19, 2018, Smithson was signed to the Arizona Cardinals' practice squad. He was released by Arizona on December 25.

=== Los Angeles Chargers ===
On January 3, 2019, Smithson was signed to the Los Angeles Chargers' practice squad.

=== Jacksonville Jaguars ===
On July 25, 2019, Smithson signed with the Jacksonville Jaguars, but was waived by the team on August 4.

=== Baltimore Ravens ===
On August 27, 2019, Smithson signed with the Baltimore Ravens. He was placed on injured reserve on August 31, and was eventually released by the team on March 18, 2020.

== Personal life ==
Smithson's brother, Antoine "Shaky" Smithson, played wide receiver at the University of Utah and was signed as an undrafted free agent by the Green Bay Packers in 2011 but was shortly released off of injured reserve with an injury settlement. His nickname "Fish" was given to him by his grandmother as a child due to his fear of fish.
