= Clint Bowen =

American football player and coach (born 1972)

Current position
- Title: Defensive coordinator
- Team: North Alabama
- Conference: UAC

Biographical details
- Born: June 27, 1972 (age 53); Lawrence, Kansas, U.S.

Playing career
- 1990: Butler County
- 1991–1994: Kansas
- Position: Defensive back

Coaching career (HC unless noted)
- 1996: Kansas (GA)
- 1997: Minnesota (GA)
- 1998–1999: Kansas (GA)
- 2001: Kansas (ST/TE)
- 2002: Kansas (ST/RB)
- 2003–2005: Kansas (ST/S)
- 2006–2007: Kansas (co-DC/S)
- 2008–2009: Kansas (DC/S)
- 2010: Western Kentucky (DC)
- 2011: North Texas (DC/S)
- 2012: Kansas (ST/S)
- 2013: Kansas (LB)
- 2014: Kansas (DC/LB)
- 2014: Kansas (interim HC)
- 2015–2018: Kansas (AHC/DC/S)
- 2019: Kansas (S)
- 2020: North Texas (DC/S)
- 2021–2024: Lawrence HS (KS)
- 2025: Oklahoma State (OQC)
- 2025: Oklahoma State (Interim DC)
- 2026–present: North Alabama (DC)

Head coaching record
- Overall: 1–7 (college)

Clint Bowen (born June 27, 1972) is an American football coach. He is the defensive coordinator at North Alabama University, a position he has held since 2026. He previously served the head football coach at Lawrence High School in Lawrence, Kansas from 2021 to 2024. He served as the defensive coordinator and safeties coach at the University of North Texas in 2020. Bowen has spent the large majority of his career as an assistant in some capacity, though he was named the interim head coach of the Kansas Jayhawks on September 28, 2014 after Charlie Weis was fired. Bowen continue his tenure at Kansas with David Beaty as the defensive coordinator of the Jayhawks and was retained on staff as the safeties coach following the hiring of Les Miles. Bowen, a former Kansas Jayhawks football player, and a Lawrence native, was on staff at Kansas for all but three years from 1996 to 2019.

== Football career ==
Bowen grew up in Perry, Kansas outside of Lawrence, Kansas, where he led his high school, the Lawrence Lions, to state titles in football, as well as track, graduating in 1990. In college, Bowen was a hard-hitting defensive back for the Jayhawks, in 92–93, following one season at Butler County Community College. He led the Kansas defense in tackles in 1993 with 114 total stops. That figure ranks as the third-most tackles by a defensive back in school history. Bowen was instrumental in helping the Jayhawks to an 8–4 record, a No. 22 national ranking and a win over BYU in the 1992 Aloha Bowl. He was the recipient of the school’s Willie Pless Tackler of the Year Award following his senior season in 1993. Bowen played college football for the Jayhawks under head coach Glen Mason.

== Personal ==
Bowen's father, Charley Bowen, was a high school All-American at Lawrence High School. His older brother, Charley Jr., was a four-year letterwinner as a defensive back for the Jayhawks (1989–1992).

Bowen and his wife, Kristie, have two sons, Baylor and Banks. Kristie is the 2014 Mrs. Kansas and was named Miss Kansas in 2001.

== Head coaching record ==
Year	Team	Overall	Conference	Standing	Bowl/playoffs
Kansas Jayhawks (Big 12 Conference) (2014)
2014	Kansas	1–7 (Note: Charlie Weis served as head coach for the first four games of the 2014 season before he was fired. Bowen was appointed interim head coach for the final eight games of the season. Kansas finished the year with an overall record of 3–9 and a mark of 1–8 in conference play.)	1–7	9th	
Kansas:		1–7	1–7		
Total:		1–7			
