= David Beaty (American football) =

American football player and coach (born 1970)

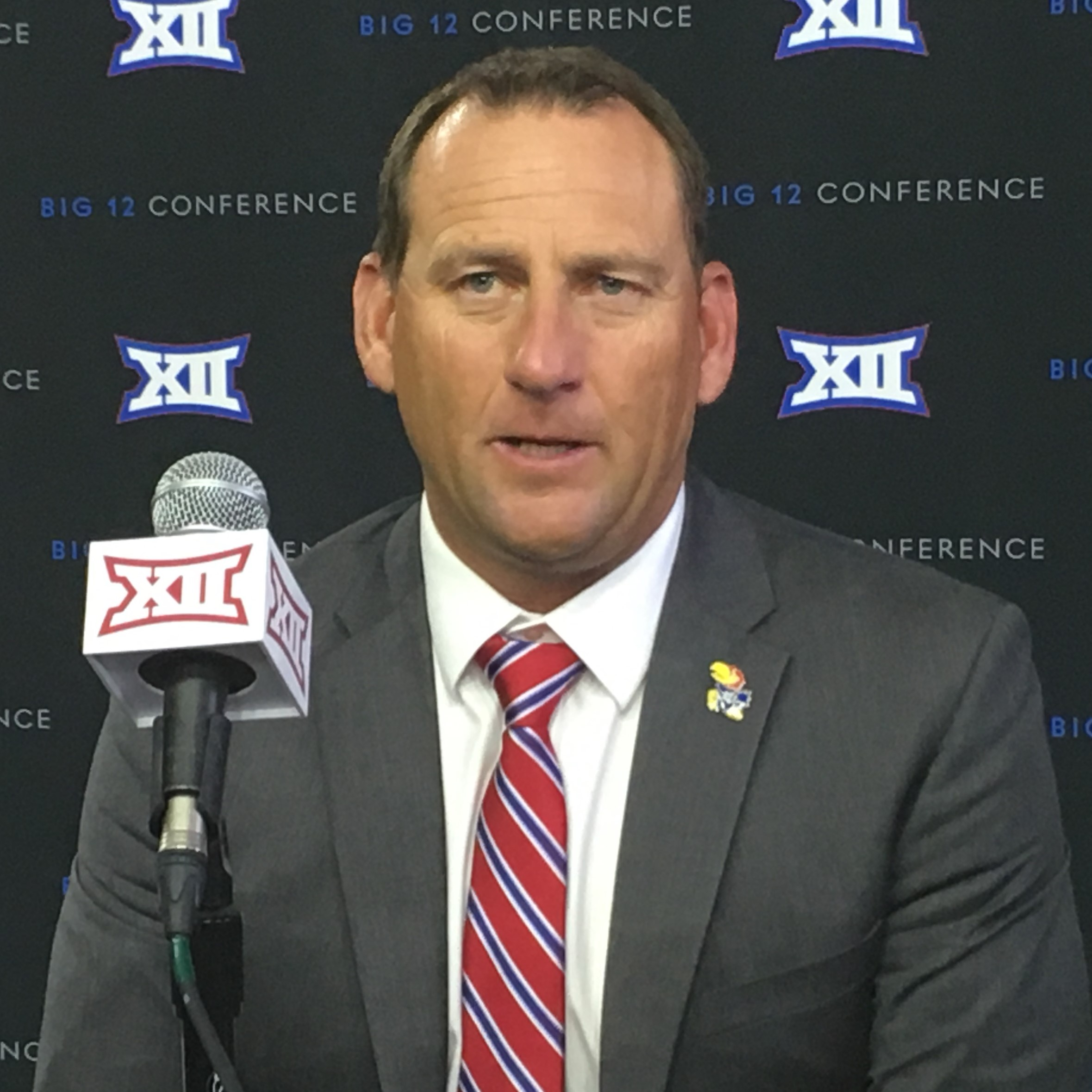
- Beaty at 2017 Big 12 Media Days

Denton High School
- Title: Head coach

Personal information
- Born: October 26, 1970 (age 56); Garland, Texas, U.S.

Career information
- High school: Garland (TX)
- College: Lindenwood

Career history
- Garland Naaman Forest HS (TX) (1994–1996) Assistant coach; Garland HS (TX) (1997–2000) Assistant coach; North Dallas HS (TX) (2001) Head coach; Irving MacArthur HS (TX) (2002–2005) Head coach; Rice (2006–2007) Passing game coordinator & wide receivers coach; Kansas (2008–2009) Wide receivers coach; Rice (2010) Offensive coordinator; Kansas (2011) Co-offensive coordinator & wide receivers coach; Texas A&M (2012) Wide receivers coach; Texas A&M (2013–2014) Wide receivers coach & recruiting coordinator; Kansas (2015–2018) Head coach; Texas (2019) Consultant; Houston Gamblers (2022) Co-offensive coordinator & wide receivers coach; Florida Atlantic (2023–2024) Wide receivers coach; Denton High School (2025-present) Head coach

Head coaching record
- Career: College: 6–42 (.125); High school: 39–15 (.722)

David Beaty (born October 26, 1970) is an American football coach who is the head football coach at Denton High School in Denton, Texas. He was the head football coach at the University of Kansas from 2015 to 2018.

== Career ==
=== Early years ===
Beaty was Kansas' wide receivers coach from 2008 to 2009 and co-offensive coordinator and wide receivers coach in 2011. He also has been an assistant coach at Rice University and Texas A&M University. Before coaching college football, Beaty coached both soccer and football at the high school level for Naaman Forest High School and Garland High School, before becoming the head football coach at North Dallas High School and Irving MacArthur.

=== University of Kansas ===
On December 5, 2014, Beaty was hired by the University of Kansas to be their head coach. In his first season, he coached the team to its first winless season since 1954. In his second season, he achieved his first conference win and first win over an FBS team, in an overtime victory over Texas on November 19, 2016. This was the first time Kansas defeated Texas since the formation of the Big 12 Conference.

Following the 2016 season, on December 12, Beaty agreed to a contract extension through 2021, with an annual salary of $1.6 million.

On September 8, 2018, Beaty lead Kansas to 31–7 victory over Central Michigan, the Jayhawks first road victory since the 2009 season. A week later, on September 15, Beaty lead Kansas to a 55–14 victory over Rutgers, which gave the Jayhawks their first winning streak since 2011.

On November 4, 2018, KU athletic director, Jeff Long, announced that Beaty would not return after the 2018 season. He was, however, allowed to finish the season as head coach. In his final 3 games at Kansas, Kansas played a close game to in state rival K-State, but ultimately fell 17–21. Next, Kansas led for part of the first half against top five ranked Oklahoma at Norman, but eventually fell 40–55. In the season finale, Kansas fell to Texas 17–24. At the conclusion of Kansas's season, Beaty was hired temporarily by the Texas Longhorns to act as a consultant.

In March 2019, Beaty sued the University of Kansas for breach of contract, alleging the university was avoiding to pay him a $3 million buyout. The two parties reached a $2.55 million settlement in June 2020.

== Head coaching record ==
=== College ===
Year	Team	Overall	Conference	Standing	Bowl/playoffs
Kansas Jayhawks (Big 12 Conference) (2015–2018)
2015	Kansas	0–12	0–9	10th	
2016	Kansas	2–10	1–8	10th	
2017	Kansas	1–11	0–9	10th	
2018	Kansas	3–9	1–8	10th	
Kansas:		6–42	2–34		
Total:		6–42			

=== High school ===
Year	Team	Overall	Conference	Standing	Bowl/playoffs
North Dallas Bulldogs () (2001)
2001	North Dallas	6–4			
North Dallas:		6–4			
Irving MacArthur Cardinals () (2002–2005)
2002	Irving MacArthur	7–4		3rd	
2003	Irving MacArthur	7–4		3rd	
2004	Irving MacArthur	10–1	7–0	1st	
2005	Irving MacArthur	9–2	6–1	2nd	
Irving MacArthur:		33–11			
Total:		39–15			
