= Ben Johnson (tight end) =

American football player (born 1994)

No. 87, 81, 41, 84
- Position: Tight end

Personal information
- Born: July 28, 1994 (age 32); Basehor, Kansas, U.S.
- Listed height: 6 ft 5 in (1.96 m)
- Listed weight: 245 lb (111 kg)

Career information
- High school: Basehor-Linwood (Basehor, Kansas)
- College: Kansas
- NFL draft: 2018: undrafted

Career history
- Los Angeles Chargers (2018)*; San Diego Fleet (2019); Los Angeles Chargers (2019)*; Seattle Dragons (2020)
- * Offseason or practice squad member only

Awards and highlights
- 2nd Team All–Big 12 (2017)
- Stats at Pro Football Reference

Benjamin Johnson (born July 28, 1994) is an American former football tight end. He attended high school at Basehor–Linwood High School in Basehor, Kansas. He played college football at the University of Kansas. He was a two time All-Big 12 tight end at Kansas, being named honorable mention in 2015 and 2nd team in 2017.

== Professional career ==
=== Los Angeles Chargers ===
After going undrafted in the 2018 NFL draft, Johnson was signed by the Los Angeles Chargers as an undrafted free agent. He was waived on September 1, 2018.

=== San Diego Fleet ===
On October 14, 2018, Johnson signed with the San Diego Fleet of the Alliance of American Football. The AAF suspended football operations on April 2, 2019, and ceased business operations on April 17.

=== Los Angeles Chargers (second stint) ===
Johnson signed with the Los Angeles Chargers on August 14, 2019. He was waived/injured during final roster cuts on August 31, and reverted to injured reserve after clearing waivers on September 1. He was waived from injured reserve with an injury settlement on September 4.

=== Seattle Dragons ===
In October 2019, Johnson was drafted by the Seattle Dragons during the open phase of the 2020 XFL draft. He had his contract terminated when the league suspended operations on April 10, 2020.
