= 2019 Baylor Bears football team =

American college football season

2019 Baylor Bears football

Big 12 Championship, L 23–30^{OT} vs Oklahoma

Sugar Bowl, L 14–26 vs. Georgia
- Conference: Big 12 Conference

Ranking
- Coaches: No. 12
- AP: No. 13
- Record: 11–3 (8–1 Big 12)
- Head coach: Matt Rhule (3rd season)
- Co-offensive coordinators: Glenn Thomas (3rd season); Jeff Nixon (3rd season)
- Offensive scheme: Spread
- Defensive coordinator: Phil Snow (3rd season)
- Base defense: 3–3 stack
- Home stadium: McLane Stadium

Uniform
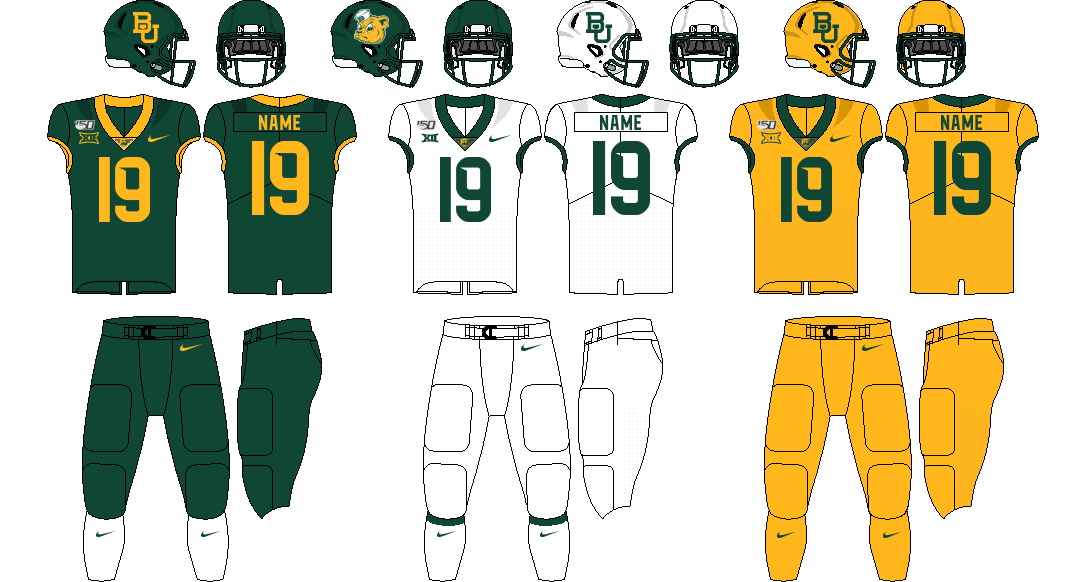

2019 Big 12 Conference football standings
	Conf.			Overall
Team	W		L	W		L
No. 7 Oklahoma y$^	8	–	1	12	–	2
No. 13 Baylor y	8	–	1	11	–	3
No. 25 Texas	5	–	4	8	–	5
Oklahoma State	5	–	4	8	–	5
Kansas State	5	–	4	8	–	5
Iowa State	5	–	4	7	–	6
West Virginia	3	–	6	5	–	7
TCU	3	–	6	5	–	7
Texas Tech	2	–	7	4	–	8
Kansas	1	–	8	3	–	9
Championship: Oklahoma 30, Baylor 23 ^{OT}
^ – College Football Playoff participant; $ – Conference champion; y – Championship game participant; Rankings from AP Poll

The 2019 Baylor Bears football team represented Baylor University in the 2019 NCAA Division I FBS football season. The Bears played their home games at the McLane Stadium in Waco, Texas, and competed in the Big 12 Conference. They were led by Matt Rhule in his third and final season as the program's head coach.

Baylor, only two years removed from a 1–11 season in 2017, began the year unranked and projected to finish in sixth in the Big 12 Conference. The Bears won their first nine games of the season and climbed to 13th in the College Football Playoff rankings, but did not play a ranked team in that span. The team then hosted then-No. 10 Oklahoma, but Baylor squandered a 25-point lead and lost 34–31. Baylor finished out the regular season with an 11–1 record, 8–1 in Big 12 play to finish tied atop the conference standings, earning them a spot in the Big 12 Championship Game, the school's first appearance in the game, to play a rematch against Oklahoma. There, the Bears lost to the Sooners again, this time in overtime, 30–23. Baylor received an invitation to the Sugar Bowl to play SEC runner-up Georgia, where they lost 26–14, to end the season at 11–3 and ranked 13th in the final AP Poll.

Baylor's defense was led by defensive tackle James Lynch, who was a consensus All-American and the Big 12 Defensive Player of the Year. He led the conference with 13.5 sacks on the season. He was joined on the first-team all-conference by defensive tackle Bravvion Roy. Offensively, the Bears were led by 3,000-yard passer Charlie Brewer, and 1,000-yard receiver Denzel Mims. Head coach Matt Rhule was named Big 12 Coach of the Year, and, after the completion of the season, he departed to take the head coaching job with the Carolina Panthers.

The Baylor Bears football team drew an average home attendance of 45,517, up significantly from 41,336 in 2018 and more than capacity.

== Preseason ==
=== Recruiting class ===
College recruiting
Name	Hometown	School	Height	Weight	40^{‡}	Commit date
Blake Bedier; Offensive Lineman	Lehi, UT	Lehi HS; Snow College	6 ft 6 in (1.98 m)	295 lb (134 kg)	-	Dec 20, 2018
Blake Bedier; Offensive Lineman	Recruit ratings: Scout: Rivals: 247Sports: ESPN:					
Tyrone Brown; Defensive Back	Beaumont, TX	Beaumont United HS	6 ft 4 in (1.93 m)	205 lb (93 kg)	-	Dec 20, 2018
Tyrone Brown; Defensive Back	Recruit ratings: Scout: Rivals: 247Sports: ESPN:					
Logan Compton; Defensive Lineman	Cypress, TX	Tomball HS	6 ft 4 in (1.93 m)	225 lb (102 kg)	-	Dec 20, 2018
Logan Compton; Defensive Lineman	Recruit ratings: Scout: Rivals: 247Sports: ESPN:					
Davis DiVall; Offensive Lineman	Scottsdale, AZ	Bridgton Academy	6 ft 5 in (1.96 m)	285 lb (129 kg)	-	Dec 20, 2018
Davis DiVall; Offensive Lineman	Recruit ratings: Scout: Rivals: 247Sports: ESPN:					
Elijah Ellis; Offensive Lineman	Paris, TX	Paris HS	6 ft 6 in (1.98 m)	279 lb (127 kg)	-	Feb 6, 2020
Elijah Ellis; Offensive Lineman	Recruit ratings: Scout: Rivals: 247Sports: ESPN:					
Jaylen Ellis; Wide Receiver	Round Rock, TX	Cedar Ridge HS	6 ft 0 in (1.83 m)	186 lb (84 kg)	-	Dec 20, 2018
Jaylen Ellis; Wide Receiver	Recruit ratings: Scout: Rivals: 247Sports: ESPN:					
TJ Franklin; Defensive Lineman	Temple, TX	Temple HS	6 ft 5 in (1.96 m)	280 lb (130 kg)	-	Dec 20, 2018
TJ Franklin; Defensive Lineman	Recruit ratings: Scout: Rivals: 247Sports: ESPN:					
Gabriel "Gabe" Hall; Defensive Line	Temple, TX	Temple HS	6 ft 5 in (1.96 m)	288 lb (131 kg)	-	Dec 20, 2018
Gabriel "Gabe" Hall; Defensive Line	Recruit ratings: Scout: Rivals: 247Sports: ESPN:					
Matt Jones; Defensive Lineman	Odessa, TX	Odessa Permian HS	6 ft 3 in (1.91 m)	230 lb (100 kg)	-	Dec 20, 2018
Matt Jones; Defensive Lineman	Recruit ratings: Scout: Rivals: 247Sports: ESPN:					
Qualan Jones; Running Back	Grand Prairie, TX	Trinity Christian	5 ft 11 in (1.80 m)	219 lb (99 kg)	-	Dec 20, 2018
Qualan Jones; Running Back	Recruit ratings: Scout: Rivals: 247Sports: ESPN:					
Paul Matavao–Poialli; Offensive Lineman	Daly City, CA	Jefferson HS	6 ft 4 in (1.93 m)	330 lb (150 kg)	-	Feb 6, 2020
Paul Matavao–Poialli; Offensive Lineman	Recruit ratings: Scout: Rivals: 247Sports: ESPN:					
Peyton Powell; Quarterback	Odessa, TX	Odessa Permian HS	6 ft 2 in (1.88 m)	187 lb (85 kg)	-	Dec 20, 2018
Peyton Powell; Quarterback	Recruit ratings: Scout: Rivals: 247Sports: ESPN:					
Garmon Randolph; Defensive End	Jefferson, GA	Jefferson HS	6 ft 7 in (2.01 m)	234 lb (106 kg)	-	Feb 6, 2020
Garmon Randolph; Defensive End	Recruit ratings: Scout: Rivals: 247Sports: ESPN:					
Noah Rauschenberg; Kicker	Tulsa, OK	Union HS	6 ft 1 in (1.85 m)	203 lb (92 kg)	-	Feb 6, 2020
Noah Rauschenberg; Kicker	Recruit ratings: Scout: Rivals: 247Sports: ESPN:					
Sam Snyder; Tight End	Fleming Island, FL	Fleming Island HS	6 ft 5 in (1.96 m)	225 lb (102 kg)	-	Dec 20, 2018
Sam Snyder; Tight End	Recruit ratings: Scout: Rivals: 247Sports: ESPN:					
Yusuf Terry; Wide Receiver	Philadelphia, PA	Imhotep Institute Charter HS	6 ft 3 in (1.91 m)	175 lb (79 kg)	-	Feb 6, 2020
Yusuf Terry; Wide Receiver	Recruit ratings: Scout: Rivals: 247Sports: ESPN:					
Solomon Turner; Defensive Back	Frisco, TX	Prestonwood Christian	6 ft 2 in (1.88 m)	216 lb (98 kg)	-	Dec 20, 2018
Solomon Turner; Defensive Back	Recruit ratings: Scout: Rivals: 247Sports: ESPN:					
Hakeem Vance; Defensive Back	Olive Branch, MS	Hattiesburg HS	6 ft 1 in (1.85 m)	203 lb (92 kg)	-	Dec 20, 2018
Hakeem Vance; Defensive Back	Recruit ratings: Scout: Rivals: 247Sports: ESPN:					
Brandon White; Defensive Back	Amarillo, TX	Tascosa HS	6 ft 0 in (1.83 m)	170 lb (77 kg)	-	Dec 20, 2018
Brandon White; Defensive Back	Recruit ratings: Scout: Rivals: 247Sports: ESPN:					
Harrison White; Defensive Line	Houston, TX	Klein HS	6 ft 5 in (1.96 m)	263 lb (119 kg)	-	Dec 20, 2018
Harrison White; Defensive Line	Recruit ratings: Scout: Rivals: 247Sports: ESPN:					
Jonah White; Running Back	Merkel, TX	Merkel HS	6 ft 0 in (1.83 m)	200 lb (91 kg)	-	Dec 20, 2018
Jonah White; Running Back	Recruit ratings: Scout: Rivals: 247Sports: ESPN:					
Will Williams; Linebacker	El Paso, TX	Chapin HS	6 ft 2 in (1.88 m)	200 lb (91 kg)	-	Dec 20, 2018
Will Williams; Linebacker	Recruit ratings: Scout: Rivals: 247Sports: ESPN:					
Jacob Zeno; Quarterback	San Antonio, TX	John Jay HS	6 ft 3 in (1.91 m)	192 lb (87 kg)	-	Dec 20, 2018
Jacob Zeno; Quarterback	Recruit ratings: Scout: Rivals: 247Sports: ESPN:					
Niadre Zouzoua; Defensive Lineman	Brockton, MA	Brockton HS; Monroe College	6 ft 4 in (1.93 m)	245 lb (111 kg)	-	Dec 20, 2018
Niadre Zouzoua; Defensive Lineman	Recruit ratings: Scout: Rivals: 247Sports: ESPN:					

=== Award watch lists ===
Listed in the order that they were released

Award	Player	Position	Year
Maxwell Award	Charlie Brewer	QB	JR
Bednarik Award	James Lynch	DL	JR
Davey O'Brien Award	Charlie Brewer	QB	JR
Biletnikoff Award	Denzel Mims	WR	SR
Butkus Award	Clay Johnston	LB	SR
Bronko Nagurski Trophy	Clay Johnston	LB	SR
Outland Trophy	James Lynch	DL	JR
Paul Hornung Award	John Lovett	RB/S	JR
Manning Award	Charlie Brewer	QB	JR

=== Big 12 media poll ===
The 2019 Big 12 media days were held July 15–16, 2019 in Frisco, Texas. In the Big 12 preseason media poll, Baylor was predicted to finish in sixth in the standings.

=== Preseason All-Big 12 teams ===
Defensive

- James Lynch – JR, Defensive Lineman
- Clay Johnston – SR, Linebacker

== Roster ==
2019 Baylor Bears football team roster
Players
Coaches
Offense

Pos.	#	Name	Class
WR	5	Denzel Mims	Sr
RB	6	JaMycal Hasty	Sr
RB	7	John Lovett	Jr
QB	11	Gerry Bohanon	Fr
QB	12	Charlie Brewer	Jr
WR	13	R. J. Sneed	So
WR	14	Chris Platt	Sr
QB	14	Jacob Zeno	Fr
WR	15	Tripp Mitchell	Fr
WR	16	Jared Atkinson	Jr
QB	16	Bo Brewer	Fr
QB	17	Garret McGuire	So
QB	18	Brandon Bass	Fr
WR	18	Gavin Holmes	So
WR	19	Yusuf Terry	Fr
RB	20	Craig Williams	Fr
WR	21	Josh Fleeks	So
RB	25	Trestan Ebner	Jr
RB	27	Qualan Jones	Fr
RB, LB	28	Abram Smith	So
WR	29	Davis Baucum	Fr
RB	31	Jacoby Clarke	Fr
RB	32	Skyler Wetzel	Jr
RB	33	Jonah White	Fr
WR	34	Blake Perdue	Jr
TE	37	Cody George	Sr
FB	38	Koby Bullard	Jr
WR	40	Kolby White	Fr
RB	44	Dru Dixon	So
OL	50	Paul Matavao–Poialii	Fr
OL	52	Sam Tecklenburg	Sr
OL	55	Xavier Newman-Johnson	Jr
OL	56	Blake Bedier	Jr
OL	57	Johncarlo Valentin	Sr
OL	58	Ty Smith	So
OL	61	Khalil Keith	So
OL	63	Jake Fruhmorgen	Sr
OL	65	Blake George	Fr
OL	66	Colby Johnston	Fr
OL	70	Jackson Kimble	Fr
OL	71	Jim Threet	Jr
OL	73	Davis DiVall	Fr
OL	74	Prince Pines	Fr
OL	75	Elijah Ellis	Fr
OL	76	Connor Galvin	So
OL	77	Jason Moore	So
OL	78	Henry Klinge III	So
OL	79	Casey Phillips	Fr
WR	80	Jackson Gleeson	Fr
WR	81	Tyquan Thornton	So
TE	82	Tyler Henderson	So
WR	82	Kyle Peterson	Jr
WR	83	Russell Morrison	Jr
WR	84	Jaylen Ellis	Fr
WR	84	Marques Jones	Sr
TE	85	Sam Snyder	Fr
TE	86	Ben Sims	Fr
TE	87	Christoph Henle	So
TE, DT	91	Rob Saulin	So

Defense

Pos.	#	Name	Class
S	1	Grayland Arnold	Jr
LB	2	Blake Lynch	Sr
S	3	Chris Miller	Sr
LB	4	Clay Johnston	Sr
S	8	Henry Black	Sr
DE	9	James Lockhart	Sr
CB	11	Jameson Houston	Sr
CB	12	Kalon Barnes	So
CB	13	Raleigh Texada	Jr
S	15	Christian Morgan	So
CB	20	Brandon White	Fr
S	22	JT Woods	So
S	23	Zeke Brown	Jr
LB	24	Jalen Pitre	Jr
CB	25	Byron Hanspard Jr.	Fr
LB	26	Terrel Bernard	So
S	30	Will Baxter	Fr
S	30	Hakeem Vance	Fr
S	31	Griffin Speaks	Fr
LB	32	Tyrone Brown	Fr
S	33	Will Williams	Fr
LB	34	Owen Rogers	Sr
LB	35	Tyrstan Slinker	Jr
CB	35	Shevin Smith	Fr
CB	36	Ricardo Benitez	Fr
LB	36	Solo Turner	Fr
CB	37	Mark Milton	Fr
LB	38	Jordan Williams	Sr
S	39	Colby Delashaw	Fr
LB	41	Jake Copeland	Jr
S	42	Jairon McVea	Jr
LB	45	Bryson Jackson	So
CB	47	Alex Lanham	Fr
S	48	Collin Losack	Fr
LB	50	Ashton Logan	So
DE	51	Jackson Shupp	Fr
LB	52	Matt Jones	Fr
DT	54	Brayden Utley	Fr
DE	55	Garmon Randolph	Fr
LB	58	Michael McNair	Jr
DT	64	Ryan Miller	Jr
DE	88	Bralen Taylor	Fr
DT	90	TJ Franklin	Fr
DT	92	Josh Landry	Fr
DT	93	James Lynch	Jr
DT	94	Harrison White	Fr
DT	95	Gabe Hall	Fr
DT	96	Cole Maxwell	So
DE	97	Niadré Zouzoua	Jr
DT	98	Chidi Ogbonnaya	So
DT	99	Bravvion Roy	Sr

Special teams

Pos.	#	Name	Class
P	43	Issac Power	Fr
LS	46	Ross Matiscik	Sr
LS	67	Thor Rodoni	Jr
K	89	Jay Sedwick	So
K	95	John Mayers	Fr
K	98	Josh Grant	So
K	99	Noah Rauschenberg	Fr

Head coach

- Matt Rhule (Buffalo)
- Joey McGuire (Texas–Arlington)
  Interim Head Coach (offseason only)

Coordinators/assistant coaches

- Phil Snow (Cal State Hayward)
  Defensive coordinator/s
- Jeff Nixon (Shippensburg)
  Co-offensive coordinator/rb
- Glenn Thomas (Texas Tech)
  Co-offensive coordinator/qb
- Mike Siravo (Boston College)
  Special teams coordinator/lb
- Shawn Bell (Baylor)
  Offensive line
- Evan Cooper (Temple)
  Recruiting coordinator/cb
- Frisman Jackson (Western Illinois)
  Passing game coordinator/wr
- Frank Okam (Rice)
  Defensive line
- Marcus Satterfield (East Tennessee State)
  Assistant head coach/te
- George DeLeone (Southern Connecticut)
  Assistant head coach/ol

Legend

- (C) Team captain
- (S) Suspended
- (I) Ineligible
- Injured
- Redshirt

Roster
Last update: 29 May 2019

== Schedule ==
Baylor announced its 2019 football schedule on October 18, 2018. The 2019 schedule consisted of 7 home and 5 away games in the regular season.

Date	Time	Opponent	Rank	Site	TV	Result	Attendance
August 31, 2019	6:00 p.m.	Stephen F. Austin*		McLane Stadium; Waco, TX	ESPN+	W 56–17	43,013
September 7	3:00 p.m.	UTSA*		McLane Stadium; Waco, TX	FSN	W 63–14	40,274
September 21	6:00 p.m.	at Rice*		Rice Stadium; Houston, TX	CBSSN	W 21–13	20,198
September 28	2:30 p.m.	Iowa State		McLane Stadium; Waco, TX	ESPN	W 23–21	42,359
October 5	2:30 p.m.	at Kansas State		Bill Snyder Family Football Stadium; Manhattan, KS	ESPN2	W 31–12	50,448
October 12	3:00 p.m.	Texas Tech^{†}	No. 22	McLane Stadium; Waco, TX (rivalry)	FS1	W 33–30 ^{2OT}	47,264
October 19	3:00 p.m.	at Oklahoma State	No. 18	Boone Pickens Stadium; Stillwater, OK	FOX	W 45–27	55,060
October 31	7:00 p.m.	West Virginia	No. 12	McLane Stadium; Waco, TX	ESPN	W 17–14	46,379
November 9	11:00 a.m.	at TCU	No. 12	Amon G. Carter Stadium; Fort Worth, TX (rivalry)	FS1	W 29–23 ^{3OT}	45,870
November 16	6:30 p.m.	No. 10 Oklahoma	No. 13	McLane Stadium; Waco, TX (College GameDay)	ABC	L 31–34	50,223
November 23	2:30 p.m.	Texas	No. 14	McLane Stadium; Waco, TX (rivalry)	FS1	W 24–10	49,109
November 30	2:30 p.m.	at Kansas	No. 9	David Booth Kansas Memorial Stadium; Lawrence, KS	ESPN	W 61–6	22,531
December 7	11:00 a.m.	vs. No. 6 Oklahoma	No. 7	AT&T Stadium; Arlington, TX (Big 12 Championship Game)	ABC	L 23–30 ^{OT}	65,191
January 1, 2020	7:45 p.m.	vs. No. 5 Georgia*	No. 7	Mercedes-Benz Superdome; New Orleans, LA (Sugar Bowl)	ESPN	L 14–26	55,211
*Non-conference game; ^{†}Homecoming; Rankings from AP Poll and CFP Rankings after November 5 released prior to game; All times are in Central time

Schedule source:

== Game summaries ==
=== Stephen F. Austin ===
Stephen F. Austin at Baylor – Game summary

Quarter	1	2	3	4	Total
Lumberjacks	7	0	0	10	17
Bears	14	21	14	7	56

at McLane Stadium, Waco, TX

- Date: August 31
- Game time: 6:00 p.m. CDT
- Game weather: 91 °F (33 °C); fair
- Game attendance: 43,013
- Referee: Cal McNeill
- TV: ESPN+

Game information

First quarter

- (11:48) BAY TD – Trestan Ebner 16-yard pass from Charlie Brewer, John Mayers kick
  Baylor 7–0; Drive: 6 plays, 45 yards, 1:34
- (08:13) BAY TD – R. J. Sneed 11-yard pass from Charlie Brewer, John Mayers kick
  Baylor 14–0; Drive: 5 plays, 46 yards, 1:51
- (03:17) SFA TD – Trae Self 3-yard rush, Storm Ruiz kick
  Baylor 14–7; Drive: 11 plays, 75 yards, 4:56

Second quarter

- (10:53) BAY TD – Trestan Ebner 21-yard rush, John Mayers kick
  Baylor 21–7; Drive: 6 plays, 34 yards, 2:20
- (06:48) BAY TD – Trestan Ebner 11-yard pass from Charlie Brewer, John Mayers kick
  Baylor 28–7; Drive: 7 plays, 81 yards, 2:34
- (02:20) BAY TD – John Lovett 19-yard rush, John Mayers kick
  Baylor 35–7; Drive: 6 plays, 45 yards, 1:34

Third quarter

- (13:40) BAY TD – R. J. Sneed 21-yard pass from Charlie Brewer, John Mayers kick
  Baylor 42–7; Drive: 4 plays, 75 yards, 1:20
- (10:07) BAY TD – Tyquan Thornton 9-yard pass from Gerry Bohanon, Nick Rauschenberg kick
  Baylor 49–7; Drive: 6 plays, 63 yards, 2:39

Fourth quarter

- (11:16) SFA FG – Storm Ruiz 32-yard field goal
  Baylor 49–10; Drive: 7 plays, 15 yards, 3:37
- (04:26) BAY TD – Abram Smith 9-yard pass from Charlie Brewer, Noah Rauschenberg kick
  Baylor 56–10; Drive: 11 plays, 80 yards, 6:50
- (01:04) SFA TD – Josh McGowen 1-yard rush, Storm Ruiz kick
  Baylor 56–17; Drive: 7 plays, 75 yards, 3:22

Top passers

- SFA – Trae Self – 15/29, 140 yards, INT
- BAY – Charlie Brewer – 21/31, 199 yards, 3 TD

Top rushers

- SFA – Thomas Hutchings – 10 carries, 68 yards
- BAY – John Lovett – 8 carries, 108 yards, TD

Top receivers

- SFA – Xavier Gipson – 3 receptions, 61 yards
- BAY – R. J. Sneed – 5 receptions, 57 yards, 2 TD

Statistics	Stephen F. Austin	Baylor
First downs	13	30
Total yards	277	518
Rushing yards	119	268
Passing yards	158	250
Turnovers	1	1
Time of possession	30:07	29:53

Baylor opened up the 2019 season by beating FCS Stephen F. Austin 56-17 in Waco. Trestan Ebner had three first half touchdowns for the Bears

=== UTSA ===
Texas–San Antonio at Baylor – Game summary

Quarter	1	2	3	4	Total
Roadrunners	0	0	7	7	14
Bears	14	21	14	14	63

at McLane Stadium, Waco, TX

- Date: September 7
- Game time: 3:00 p.m. CDT
- Game weather: 99 °F (37 °C); fair
- Game attendance: 40,274
- Referee: David Alvarez
- TV: FOX Sports

Game information

First quarter

- (08:22) BAY TD – Denzel Mims 9-yard pass from Charlie Brewer, John Mayers kick
  Baylor 7–0; Drive: 4 plays, 70 yards, 1:23
- (00:43) BAY TD – Charlie Brewer 5-yard rush, John Mayers kick
  Baylor 14–0; Drive: 9 plays, 79 yards, 3:50

Second quarter

- (09:27) BAY TD – Denzel Mims 30-yard pass from Charlie Brewer, John Mayers kick
  Baylor 21–0; Drive: 8 plays, 72 yards, 4:02
- (07:09) BAY TD – Grayland Arnold 73-yard punt returned, John Mayers kick
  Baylor 28–0; Drive: 3 plays, 10 yards, 2:18
- (01:30) BAY TD – Denzel Mims 26-yard pass from Charlie Brewer, John Mayers kick
  Baylor 35–0; Drive: 9 plays, 75 yards, 4:06

Third quarter

- (11:25) BAY TD – Gerry Bohanon 3-yard rush, John Mayers kick
  Baylor 42–0; Drive: 8 plays, 70 yards, 3:35
- (06:11) BAY TD – JaMycal Hasty 1-yard rush, John Mayers kick
  Baylor 49–0; Drive: 6 plays, 82 yards, 2:50
- (00:03) UTSA TD – Sincere McCormick 2-yard rush, Hunter Duplessis kick
  Baylor 49–7; Drive: 16 plays, 79 yards, 6:08

Fourth quarter

- (12:22) UTSA TD – Sincere McCormick 54-yard rush, Hunter Duplessis kick
  Baylor 49–14; Drive: 4 plays, 65 yards, 1:46
- (08:30) BAY TD – Chris Platt 15-yard rush, Noah Rauschenberg kick
  Baylor 56–14; Drive: 2 plays, 16 yards, 0:43
- (05:33) BAY TD – Qualan Jones 61-yard rush, Noah Rauschenberg kick
  Baylor 63–14; Drive: 3 plays, 65 yards, 1:37

Top passers

- UTSA – Frank Harris – 15/24, 93 yards
- BAY – Charlie Brewer – 12/16, 163 yards, 3 TD

Top rushers

- UTSA – Sincere McCormick – 12 carries, 87 yards, 2 TD
- BAY – Gerry Bohanon – 7 carries, 93 yards, TD

Top receivers

- UTSA – Joshua Cephus – 2 receptions, 23 yards
- BAY – Denzel Mims – 7 receptions, 101 yards, 3 TD

Statistics	UTSA	Baylor
First downs	14	25
Total yards	266	546
Rushing yards	164	368
Passing yards	102	178
Turnovers	1	0
Time of possession	31:31	28:29

=== At Rice ===
Baylor at Rice – Game summary

Quarter	1	2	3	4	Total
Bears	7	14	0	0	21
Owls	0	3	3	7	13

at Rice Stadium, Houston, TX

- Date: September 21
- Game time: 6:00 p.m. CDT
- Game weather: 85 °F (29 °C); partly cloudy
- Game attendance: 20,198
- Referee: Billy Williams
- TV: CBS Sports Network

Game information

First quarter

- (03:12) BAY TD – Josh Fleeks 6-yard rush, John Mayers kick
  Baylor 7–0; Drive: 9 plays, 86 yards, 4:01

Second quarter

- (08:09) RICE FG – Will Harrison 28-yard field goal
  Baylor 7–3; Drive: 13 plays, 55 yards, 6:47
- (05:02) BAY TD – Chris Platt 50-yard pass from Charlie Brewer, John Mayers kick
  Baylor 14–3; Drive: 7 plays, 84 yards, 3:07
- (00:15) BAY TD – Charlie Brewer 25-yard rush, John Mayers kick
  Baylor 21–3; Drive: 5 plays, 74 yards, 0:39

Third quarter

- (03:50) RICE FG – Will Harrison 24-yard field goal
  Baylor 21–6; Drive: 14 plays, 55 yards, 6:35

Fourth quarter

- (08:42) RICE TD – Tom Stewart 21-yard rush, Will Harrison kick
  Baylor 21–13; Drive: 4 plays, 46 yards, 1:17

Top passers

- BAY – Charlie Brewer – 20/27, 303 yards, TD
- RICE – Wiley Green – 13/23, 128 yards

Top rushers

- BAY – Charlie Brewer – 12 carries, 58 yards, TD
- RICE – Charlie Booker – 12 carries, 29 yards

Top receivers

- BAY – Denzel Mims – 6 receptions, 102 yards
- RICE – Brad Rozner – 7 receptions, 100 yards

Statistics	Baylor	Rice
First downs	20	17
Total yards	427	242
Rushing yards	124	64
Passing yards	303	178
Turnovers	2	1
Time of possession	27:45	32:15

=== Iowa State ===
Iowa State at Baylor – Game summary

Quarter	1	2	3	4	Total
Cyclones	0	0	0	21	21
Bears	0	7	13	3	23

at McLane Stadium, Waco, TX

- Date: September 28
- Game time: 2:30 p.m. CDT
- Game weather: 93 °F (34 °C); mostly cloudy
- Game attendance: 42,359
- Referee: Mike Defee
- TV: ESPN

Game information

Second quarter

- (00:58) BAY TD – Denzel Mims 9-yard pass from Charlie Brewer, John Mayers kick
  Baylor 7–0; Drive: 12 plays, 68 yards, 5:03

Third quarter

- (10:00) BAY TD – Denzel Mims 24-yard pass from Charlie Brewer, two-point rush conversion attempt failed
  Baylor 13–0; Drive: 12 plays, 75 yards, 5:00
- (01:26) BAY TD – Tyquan Thornton 35-yard pass from Charlie Brewer, John Mayers kick
  Baylor 20–0; Drive: 7 plays, 90 yards, 3:11

Fourth quarter

- (14:34) ISU TD – Johnnie Lang 3-yard rush, Connor Assalley kick
  Baylor 20–7; Drive: 6 plays, 75 yards, 1:52
- (07:24) ISU TD – Johnnie Lang 12-yard pass from Brock Purdy, Connor Assalley kick
  Baylor 20–14; Drive: 6 plays, 72 yards, 2:28
- (03:45) ISU TD – Charlie Kolar 20-yard pass from Brock Purdy, Connor Assalley kick
  Iowa State 21–20; Drive: 6 plays, 65 yards, 2:45
- (00:21) BAY FG – John Mayers 38-yard field goal
  Baylor 23–21; Drive: 14 plays, 54 yards, 3:24

Top passers

- ISU – Brock Purdy – 27/45, 342 yards, 2 TD, INT
- BAY – Charlie Brewer – 26/43, 307 yards, 3 TD

Top rushers

- ISU – Johnnie Lang – 6 carries, 35 yards, TD
- BAY – John Lovett – 12 carries, 52 yards

Top receivers

- ISU – Deshaunte Jones – 7 receptions, 77 yards
- BAY – Tyquan Thornton – 11 receptions, 141 yards, TD

Statistics	Iowa State	Baylor
First downs	23	24
Total yards	405	411
Rushing yards	63	104
Passing yards	342	307
Turnovers	2	0
Time of possession	29:43	30:17

=== At Kansas State ===
Baylor at Kansas State – Game summary

Quarter	1	2	3	4	Total
Bears	0	10	7	14	31
Wildcats	3	0	3	6	12

at Bill Snyder Family Football Stadium, Manhattan, KS

- Date: October 5
- Game time: 2:30 p.m. CDT
- Game weather: 70 °F (21 °C); mostly clear
- Game attendance: 50,448
- Referee: Eddy Shelton
- TV: ESPN2

Game information

First quarter

- (02:11) KSU FG – Blake Lynch 31-yard field goal
  Kansas State 3–0; Drive: 10 plays, 60 yards, 5:18

Second quarter

- (14:27) BAY FG – John Mayers 36-yard field goal
  Tied 3–3; Drive: 8 plays, 57 yards, 2:44
- (06:38) BAY TD – Tyquan Thornton 29-yard pass from Charlie Brewer, John Mayers kick
  Baylor 10–3; Drive: 6 plays, 98 yards, 2:28

Third quarter

- (11:27) BAY TD – John Lovett 13-yard rush, John Mayers kick
  Baylor 17–3; Drive: 6 plays, 91 yards, 2:09
- (00:21) KSU FG – Blake Lynch 29-yard field goal
  Baylor 17–6; Drive: 12 plays, 61 yards, 6:24

Fourth quarter

- (10:34) BAY TD – Gary Bohanon 4-yard rush, John Mayers kick
  Baylor 24–6; Drive: 6 plays, 63 yards, 2:02
- (06:24) KSU TD – Dalton Schoen 5-yard pass from Skylar Thompson, two-point rush conversion attempt failed
  Baylor 24–12; Drive: 9 plays, 67 yards, 4:04
- (05:37) BAY TD – John Lovett 36-yard rush, John Mayers kick
  Baylor 31–12; Drive: 2 plays, 43 yards, 0:46

Top passers

- BAY – Charlie Brewer – 14/23, 230 yards, TD
- KSU – Skylar Thompson – 22/34, 218 yards, TD, INT

Top rushers

- BAY – JaMycal Hasty – 8 carries, 87 yards
- KSU – James Gilbert – 18 carries, 94 yards

Top receivers

- BAY – Tyquan Thornton – 4 receptions, 92 yards, TD
- KSU – Dalton Schoen – 6 receptions, 69 yards, TD

Statistics	Baylor	Kansas State
First downs	18	21
Total yards	426	341
Rushing yards	158	123
Passing yards	268	218
Turnovers	0	2
Time of possession	23:15	36:45

Baylor's defense proved formidable and produced two turnovers, while their offense completed a balanced run game. Baylor remained undefeated with the 31-12 win over Kansas State.

=== Texas Tech ===
Texas Tech at Baylor – Game summary

Quarter	1	2	3	4	OT	Total
Red Raiders	3	3	7	7	10	30
No. 22 Bears	0	3	14	3	13	33

at McLane Stadium, Waco, TX

- Date: October 12
- Game time: 3:00 p.m. CDT
- Game weather: 64 °F (18 °C); fair
- Game attendance: 47,264
- Referee: Brad Van Vark
- TV: FoxSports1

Game information

First quarter

- (00:00) TTU FG – Trey Wolff 40-yard field goal
  Texas Tech 3–0; Drive: 9 plays, 46 yards, 3:55

Second quarter

- (10:08) BAY FG – John Mayers 37-yard field goal
  Tied 3–3; Drive: 6 plays, 21 yards, 1:44
- (00:09) TTU FG – Trey Wolff 25-yard field goal
  Texas Tech 6–3; Drive: 7 plays, 33 yards, 2:54

Third quarter

- (13:03) BAY TD – Charlie Brewer 4-yard rush, John Mayers kick
  Baylor 10–6; Drive: 5 plays, 36 yards, 1:57
- (11:05) TTU TD – SaRodorick Thompson 4-yard rush, Trey Wolff kick
  Texas Tech 13–10; Drive: 5 plays, 89 yards, 1:58
- (08:05) BAY TD – Charlie Brewer 1-yard rush, John Mayers kick
  Baylor 17–13; Drive: 7 plays, 74 yards, 3:00

Fourth quarter

- (01:37) TTU TD – SoRodorick Thompson 30-yard rush, Trey Wolff kick
  Texas Tech 20–17; Drive: 9 plays, 88 yards, 2:42
- (00:00) BAY FG – John Mayers 19-yard field goal
  Tied 20–20; Drive: 11 plays, 89 yards, 1:37

First overtime

- BAY TD – Charlie Brewer 1-yard rush, John Mayers kick
  Baylor 27–20; Drive: 3 plays, 25 yards
- TTU TD – T. J. Vasher 2-yard pass from Jett Duffey, Trey Wolff kick
  Tied 27–27; Drive: 7 plays, 25 yards

Second overtime

- TTU FG – Trey Wolff 35-yard field goal
  Texas Tech 30–27; Drive: 4 plays, 8 yards
- BAY TD – JaMycal Hasty 5-yard rush, John Mayers kick
  Baylor 33–30; Drive: 3 plays, 25 yards

Top passers

- TTU – Jett Duffey – 31/42, 362 yards, TD, 2 INT
- BAY – Charlie Brewer – 24/37, 352 yards, 3 INT

Top rushers

- TTU – SaRodorick Thompson – 28 carries, 153 yards, 2 TD
- BAY – John Lovett – 17 carries, 77 yards

Top receivers

- TTU – R. J. Turner – 7 receptions, 138 yards
- BAY – R. J. Sneed – 6 receptions, 84 yards

Statistics	Texas Tech	Baylor
First downs	26	27
Total yards	510	525
Rushing yards	148	173
Passing yards	362	352
Turnovers	3	3
Time of possession	31:00	29:00

For the team's homecoming game, Baylor replaced their traditional interlocking 'BU' on their green helmet with the 'Sailor Bear' logo originally created by Arthur Evans for the second straight year.

Texas Tech traveled to Waco to play Baylor, the two teams had played one another at AT&T Stadium in Arlington, TX nearly every year from 2009-2018. The 2010 game was played at the Cotton Bowl in Dallas, TX, the only game in this stretch that was not played at AT&T Stadium.

The first half of the game was a defensive battle between the two teams. Texas Tech scored only 6 points in the half with two field goals from Trey Wolff while Baylor only scored 3 with a 37-yard field goal from John Mayers. The Red Raiders had 182 yards of offense in the first half while the Bears had 117. Baylor scored the first touchdown of the game for either team on its first drive of the half with a 4-yard run from Charlie Brewer. After trailing for most of the half, the Red Raiders scored a touchdown with 1:37 left in regulation to take a 20–17 lead. The Bears marched down field with Mayers making a 19-yard field goal as time expired to tie the game. Baylor started overtime on offense with Texas Tech on defense. During the drive, center Jake Fruhmorgen appeared to have fumbled the ball on a snap with the ball being recovered by Jaylon Hutchings for the Red Raiders and the play was blown dead quickly. The fumble was overturned as Baylor was penalized for an illegal snap penalty. The call was heavily criticized and the following day Texas Tech athletic director Kirby Hocutt announced that the Big 12 had told him that the penalty was the wrong call and that Texas Tech should have gained possession. Hocutt was later fined by the conference for making the announcement in violation of league policy.

After winning in 2 overtime periods by a score of 33-30, Baylor moved up 4 spots in the AP poll from #22 to #18.

=== At Oklahoma State ===
Baylor at Oklahoma State – Game summary

Quarter	1	2	3	4	Total
No. 18 Bears	7	3	14	21	45
Cowboys	6	7	7	7	27

at Boone Pickens Stadium, Stillwater, OK

- Date: October 19
- Game time: 3:00 p.m. CDT
- Game weather: 73 °F (23 °C); sunny; N 14 MPH
- Game attendance: 55,060
- Referee: Reggie Smith
- TV announcers (FOX): Tim Brando (play-by-play), Spencer Tillman (analyst) & Coley Harvey (sideline)

Game information

First quarter

- (12:06) BAY TD – John Lovett 25-yard rush, John Mayers kick
  Baylor 7–0; Drive: 3 plays, 62 yards, 1:08
- (06:37) OSU TD – Jordan McCray 5-yard pass from Spencer Sanders, Matt Ammendola PAT blocked
  7–6; Drive: 13 plays, 78 yards, 5:30

Second quarter

- (04:15) OSU TD – Chuba Hubbard 2-yard rush, Matt Ammendola kick
  Oklahoma State 13–7; Drive: 7 plays, 46 yards, 2:25
- (01:32) BAY FG – John Mayers 28-yard field goal
  Oklahoma State 13–10; Drive: 7 plays, 64 yards, 2:43

Third quarter

- (09:35) OSU TD – Chuba Hubbard 3-yard rush, Matt Ammendola kick
  Oklahoma State 20–10; Drive: 8 plays, 45 yards, 3:25
- (08:42) BAY TD – JaMycal Hasty 5-yard rush, John Mayers kick
  Oklahoma State 20–17; Drive: 2 plays, 83 yards, 0:53
- (02:36) BAY TD – Josh Fleeks 64-yard pass from Charlie Brewer, John Mayers kick
  Baylor 24–20; Drive: 6 plays, 93 yards, 2:55

Fourth quarter

- (12:55) OSU TD – LD Brown 68-yard rush, Matt Ammendola kick
  Oklahoma State 27–24; Drive: 5 plays, 93 yards, 1:53
- (09:04) BAY TD – Charlie Brewer 2-yard rush, John Mayers kick
  Baylor 31–27; Drive: 7 plays, 75 yards, 3:51
- (08:00) BAY TD – Terrel Bernard 20-yard fumble return, John Mayers kick
  Baylor 38–27; Drive: 3 plays, -1 yards, 1:04
- (05:13) BAY TD – JaMycal Hasty 73-yard rush, John Mayers kick
  Baylor 45–27; Drive: 1 play, 73 yards, 0:12

Top passers

- BAY – Charlie Brewer – 13/17, 312 yards, TD
- OSU – Spencer Sanders – 18/32, 157 yards, TD, INT

Top rushers

- BAY – JaMycal Hasty – 16 carries, 146 yards, 2 TD
- OSU – Chuba Hubbard – 32 carries, 171 yards, 2 TD

Top receivers

- BAY – Josh Fleeks – 3 receptions, 126 yards, TD
- OSU – Tylan Wallace – 6 receptions, 69 yards

Statistics	Baylor	Oklahoma State
First downs	18	27
Total yards	536	469
Rushing yards	224	281
Passing yards	312	188
Turnovers	1	3
Time of possession	28:12	31:48

=== West Virginia ===
West Virginia at Baylor – Game summary

Quarter	1	2	3	4	Total
Mountaineers	0	0	14	0	14
No. 12 Bears	7	0	7	3	17

at McLane Stadium, Waco, TX

- Date: October 31
- Game time: 7:00 p.m. CDT
- Game weather: 46 °F (8 °C); fair and chilly
- Game attendance: 46,379
- Referee: David Alvarez
- TV: ESPN

Game information

First quarter

- (00:06) BAY TD – R. J. Sneed 13-yard pass from Charlie Brewer, John Mayers kick
  Baylor 7–0; Drive: 8 plays, 86 yards, 4:13

Third quarter

- (06:42) WVU TD – George Campbell 83-yard pass from Austin Kendall, Casey Legg kick
  Tied 7–7; Drive: 1 play, 83 yards, 0:11
- (04:34) BAY TD – Denzel Mims 21-yard pass from Charlie Brewer, John Mayers kick
  Baylor 14–7; Drive: 7 plays, 75 yards, 2:08
- (04:22) WVU TD – Winston Wright 95-yard kickoff returned, Casey Legg kick
  Tied 14–14; Drive: 0 plays, 0 yards, 0:12

Fourth quarter

- (10:19) BAY FG – John Mayers 36-yard field goal
  Baylor 17–14; Drive: 13 plays, 62 yards, 6:06

Top passers

- WVU – Austin Kendall – 20/39, 205 yards, TD, INT
- BAY – Charlie Brewer – 20/26, 277 yards, 2 TD

Top rushers

- WVU – Leddie Brown – 9 carries, 27 yards
- BAY – JaMycal Hasty – 14 carries, 77 yards

Top receivers

- WVU – George Campbell – 1 reception, 83 yards, TD
- BAY – Denzel Mims – 5 receptions, 99 yards, TD

Statistics	West Virginia	Baylor
First downs	12	26
Total yards	219	453
Rushing yards	14	176
Passing yards	205	277
Turnovers	2	3
Time of possession	23:34	36:26

=== At TCU ===
Baylor at Texas Christian – Game summary

Quarter	1	2	3	4	OT	2OT	3OT	Total
No. 12 Bears	0	0	3	6	7	7	6	29
Horned Frogs	3	6	0	0	7	7	0	23

at Amon G. Carter Stadium, Fort Worth, TX

- Date: November 9
- Game time: 11:00 a.m. CDT
- Game weather: 59 °F (15 °C); sunny
- Game attendance: 45,870
- Referee: Brandon Cruse
- TV: FoxSports1

Game information

First quarter

- (12:34) TCU FG – Griffin Kell 47-yard field goal
  Texas Christian 3–0; Drive: 7 plays, 50 yards, 2:26

Second quarter

- (00:29) TCU FG – Jonathan Song 37-yard field goal
  Texas Christian 6–0; Drive: 11 plays, 60 yards, 5:11
- (00:00) TCU FG – Jonathan Song 31-yard field goal
  Texas Christian 9–0; Drive: 5 plays, 10 yards, 0:25

Third quarter

- (09:58) BAY FG – John Mayer 36-yard field goal
  Texas Christian 9–3; Drive: 10 plays, 56 yards, 5:02

Fourth quarter

- (14:34) BAY FG – John Mayer 24-yard field goal
  Texas Christian 9–6; Drive: 4 plays, 1 yard, 0:51
- (00:36) BAY FG – John Mayer 51-yard field goal
  Tied 9–9; Drive: 10 plays, 54 yards, 2:47

First overtime

- BAY TD – Charlie Brewer 3-yard rush, John Mayer kick
  Baylor 16–9; Drive: 8 plays, 25 yards
- TCU TD – Te'Vailance Hunt 24-yard pass from Max Duggan, Jonathan Song kick
  Tied 16–16; Drive: 4 plays, 25 yards

Second overtime

- TCU TD – Sewo Olonilua 2-yard rush, Jonathan Song kick
  Texas Christian 23–16; Drive: 5 plays, 25 yards
- BAY TD – Denzel Mims 20-yard pass from Charlie Brewer, John Mayer kick
  Tied 23–23; Drive: 4 plays, 25 yards

Third overtime

- BAY TD – Denzel Mims 4-yard pass from Charlie Brewer, two-point pass conversion failed
  Baylor 29–23; Drive: 2 plays, 25 yards

Top passers

- BAY – Charlie Brewer – 27/41, 195 yards, 2 TD, INT
- TCU – Max Duggan – 14/32, 140 yards, TD, 3 INT

Top rushers

- BAY – Charlie Brewer – 15 carries, 41 yards, TD
- TCU – Sewo Olonilua – 19 carries, 79 yards, TD

Top receivers

- BAY – Denzel Mims – 6 receptions, 57 yards, 2 TD
- TCU – Pro Wells – 4 receptions, 58 yards

Statistics	Baylor	TCU
First downs	22	18
Total yards	195	140
Rushing yards	99	168
Passing yards	195	140
Turnovers	2	3
Time of possession	29:36	30:24

Heading into Week 11 of the college football season, Baylor is on top of the Big 12 conference standings with an undefeated 8-0 record. Recent victories over West Virginia and Texas Tech were close and TCU is looking to win a few more games to become eligible for a bowl game. Both teams have been able to score and the game is listed as one of the most "compelling matchups" for the week by MSN Sports.

=== Oklahoma ===
Oklahoma at Baylor – Game summary

Quarter	1	2	3	4	Total
No. 10 Sooners	3	7	7	17	34
No. 13 Bears	14	17	0	0	31

at McLane Stadium, Waco, TX

- Date: November 16
- Game time: 6:30 p.m. CDT
- Game weather: 51 °F (11 °C); fair
- Game attendance: 50,223
- Referee: Cooper Castleberry
- TV announcers (ABC): Chris Fowler (play-by-play), Kirk Herbstreit (analyst) & Maria Taylor (sideline)

Game information

First quarter

- (09:25) OKLA FG – Gabe Brkic 39-yard field goal
  Oklahoma 3–0; Drive: 8 plays, 31 yards, 3:23
- (05:26) BAY TD – Charlie Brewer 2-yard rush, John Mayer kick
  Baylor 7–3; Drive: 10 plays, 78 yards, 3:59
- (01:51) BAY TD – Denzel Mims 30-yard pass from Charlie Brewer, John Mayer kick
  Baylor 14–3; Drive: 5 plays, 54 yards, 1:43

Second quarter

- (14:56) BAY TD – Charlie Brewer 4-yard rush, John Mayers kick
  Baylor 21–3; Drive: 2 plays, 27 yards, 0:05
- (11:02) BAY TD – Denzel Mims 9-yard pass from Charlie Brewer, John Mayers kick
  Baylor 28–3; Drive: 1 play, 9 yards, 0:07
- (05:06) OKLA TD – Austin Stogner 5-yard pass from Jalen Hurts, Gabe Brkic kick
  Baylor 28–10; Drive: 14 plays, 75 yards, 5:56
- (00:03) BAY FG – John Mayer 28-yard field goal
  Baylor 31–10; Drive: 14 plays, 61 yards, 5:03

Third quarter

- (09:16) OKLA TD – Austin Stogner 3-yard pass from Jalen Hurts, Gabe Brkic kick
  Baylor 31–17; Drive: 12 plays, 74 yards, 5:44

Fourth quarter

- (12:58) OKLA TD – Theo Wease 19-yard pass from Jalen Hurts, Gabe Brkic kick
  Baylor 31–24; Drive: 13 plays, 90 yards, 4:59
- (05:25) OKLA TD – Brayden Willis 2-yard pass from Jalen Hurts, Gabe Brkic kick
  Tied 31–31; Drive: 13 plays, 77 yards, 6:01
- (01:45) OKLA FG – Gabe Brkic 31-yard field goal
  Oklahoma 34–31; Drive: 9 plays, 59 yards, 2:30

Top passers

- OKLA – Jalen Hurts – 30/42, 297 yards, 4 TD, INT
- BAY – Charlie Brewer – 18/39, 194 yards, 2 TD, INT

Top rushers

- OKLA – Jalen Hurts – 27 carries, 114 yards
- BAY – Charlie Brewer – 17 carries, 65 yards, 2 TD

Top receivers

- OKLA – Lee Morris – 7 receptions, 86 yards
- BAY – Denzel Mims – 6 receptions, 92 yards, 2 TD

Statistics	Oklahoma	Baylor
First downs	34	18
Total yards	525	307
Rushing yards	228	113
Passing yards	297	194
Turnovers	3	2
Time of possession	41:11	18:49

=== Texas ===
Texas at Baylor – Game summary

Quarter	1	2	3	4	Total
RV Longhorns	0	3	0	7	10
No. 14 Bears	0	7	14	3	24

at McLane Stadium, Waco, TX

- Date: November 23
- Game time: 2:30 p.m. CDT
- Game weather: 59 °F (15 °C); fair skies
- Game attendance: 49,109
- Referee: Mike Defee
- TV: FoxSports1

Game information

Second quarter

- (14:51) BAY TD – John Lovett 28-yard rush, John Mayers kick
  Baylor 7–0; Drive: 7 plays, 50 yards, 2:51
- (00:00) TEX FG – Cameron Dicker 48-yard field goal
  Baylor 7–3; Drive: 2 plays, 68 yards, 0:18

Third quarter

- (07:36) BAY TD – Charlie Brewer 1-yard rush, John Mayers kick
  Baylor 14–3; Drive: 9 plays, 87 yards, 4:33
- (01:20) BAY TD – Denzel Mims 12-yard pass from Charlie Brewer, John Mayers kick
  Baylor 21–3; Drive: 9 plays, 61 yards, 4:19

Fourth quarter

- (10:57) BAY FG – John Mayers 24-yard field goal
  Baylor 24–3; Drive: 8 plays, 59 yards, 3:43
- (00:01) TEX TD – Daniel Young 4-yard rush, Cameron Dicker kick
  Baylor 24–10; Drive: 5 plays, 55 yards, 0:42

Top passers

- TEX – Sam Ehlinger – 22/37, 200 yards, INT
- BAY – Charlie Brewer – 16/25, 221 yards, TD

Top rushers

- TEX – Keaontay Ingram – 7 carries, 86 yards
- BAY – Charlie Brewer – 18 carries, 75 yards, TD

Top receivers

- TEX – Devin Duvernay – 10 receptions, 78 yards
- BAY – Denzel Mims – 7 receptions, 125 yards, TD

Statistics	Texas	Baylor
First downs	21	20
Total yards	391	391
Rushing yards	191	163
Passing yards	200	228
Turnovers	1	1
Time of possession	29:52	30:08

=== At Kansas ===
Baylor at Kansas – Game summary

Quarter	1	2	3	4	Total
No. 9 Bears	21	13	14	13	61
Jayhawks	0	0	6	0	6

at David Booth Kansas Memorial Stadium, Lawrence, KS

- Date: November 30
- Game time: 2:30 p.m. CDT
- Game weather: 57 °F (14 °C); sunny
- Game attendance: 22,531
- Referee: Brandon Cruse
- TV: ESPN

Game information

First quarter

- (08:47) BAY TD – Gerry Bohanon 6-yard rush, John Mayers kick
  Baylor 7–0; Drive: 4 plays, 73 yards, 1:29
- (06:48) BAY TD – Tyquan Thornton 51-yard pass from Charlie Brewer, John Mayers kick
  Baylor 14–0; Drive: 1 play, 51 yards, 0:09
- (01:30) BAY TD – JaMycal Hasty 13-yard rush, John Mayers kick
  Baylor 21–0; Drive: 9 plays, 75 yards, 4:04

Second quarter

- (10:24) BAY FG – John Mayers 23-yard field goal
  Baylor 24–0; Drive: 9 plays, 29 yards, 3:54
- (05:41) BAY TD – Trestan Ebner 14-yard rush, John Mayers kick
  Baylor 31–0; Drive: 3 plays, 30 yards, 0:42
- (00:01) BAY FG – John Mayers 23-yard field goal
  Baylor 34–0; Drive: 4 plays, 14 yards, 0:21

Third quarter

- (11:16) BAY TD – JaMycal Hasty 19-yard rush, John Mayers kick
  Baylor 41–0; Drive: 7 plays, 75 yards, 3:44
- (05:59) BAY TD – JaMycal Hasty 8-yard rush, John Mayers kick
  Baylor 48–0; Drive: 3 plays, 16 yards, 1:16
- (01:29) KAN TD – Andrew Parchment 11-yard pass from Manny Miles, two-point rush conversion attempt failed
  Baylor 48–6; Drive: 10 plays, 65 yards, 4:30

Fourth quarter

- (06:49) BAY TD – Qualan Jones 7-yard rush, John Mayers kick
  Baylor 55–6; Drive: 14 plays, 78 yards, 6:45
- (04:13) BAY TD – Jacob Zeno 1-yard rush, two-point rush conversion attempt failed
  Baylor 61–6; Drive: 4 plays, 25 yards, 1:44

Top passers

- BAY – Charlie Brewer – 13/25, 182 yards, TD, INT
- KAN – Carter Stanley – 13/26, 92 yards, 3 INT

Top rushers

- BAY – JaMycal Hasty – 14 carries, 92 yards, 3 TD
- KAN – Pooka Williams Jr. – 22 carries, 97 yards

Top receivers

- BAY – Tyquan Thorton – 4 receptions, 9 yards, TD
- KAN – Andrew Parchment – 5 receptions, 41 yards, TD

Statistics	Baylor	Kansas
First downs	29	15
Total yards	507	258
Rushing yards	264	142
Passing yards	243	116
Turnovers	1	6
Time of possession	33:46	26:14

=== Vs. Oklahoma (Big 12 Championship game) ===
Baylor at Oklahoma – Game summary

Quarter	1	2	3	4	OT	Total
No. 7 Bears	0	13	0	10	0	23
No. 6 Sooners	10	0	10	3	7	30

at AT&T Stadium, Arlington, TX

- Date: December 7
- Game time: 11:00 a.m. CDT
- Game weather: 72 °F (22 °C); indoors
- Game attendance: 61,191
- Referee: Mike Defee
- TV: ABC

Game information

First quarter

- (09:31) OKLA TD – Kennedy Brooks 6-yard rush, Gabe Brkic kick
  Oklahoma 7–0; Drive: 3 plays, 78 yards, 1:21
- (04:51) OKLA FG – Gabe Brkic 44-yard field goal
  Oklahoma 10–0; Drive: 7 plays, 34 yards, 3:06

Second quarter

- (10:20) BAY FG – John Mayers 44-yard field goal
  Oklahoma 10–3; Drive: 4 plays, 3 yards, 1:25
- (02:59) BAY TD – Tyquan Thornton 33-yard pass from Gerry Bohanon, John Mayers kick
  Tied 10–10; Drive: 3 plays, 23 yards, 0:59
- (00:08) BAY FG – John Mayers 28-yard field goal
  Baylor 13–10; Drive: 9 plays, 42 yards, 1:14

Third quarter

- (07:53) OKLA FG – Gabe Brkic 24-yard field goal
  Tied 13–13; Drive: 11 plays, 63 yards, 5:39
- (03:09) OKLA TD – Nick Basquine 18-yard pass from Jalen Hurts, Gabe Brkic kick
  Oklahoma 20–13; Drive: 8 plays, 74 yards, 3:46

Fourth quarter

- (10:31) OKLA FG – Gabe Brkic 24-yard field goal
  Oklahoma 23–13; Drive: 10 plays, 43 yards, 4:43
- (09:41) BAY TD – Trestan Ebner 81-yard pass from Jacob Zeno, John Mayers kick
  Oklahoma 23–20; Drive: 2 plays, 75 yards, 0:50
- (03:25) BAY FG – John Mayers 27-yard field goal
  Tied 23–23; Drive: 5 plays, 80 yards, 2:46

First overtime

- OKLA TD – Rhamondre Stevenson 5-yard rush, Gabe Brkic kick
  Oklahoma 30–23; Drive: 3 plays, 25 yards

Top passers

- BAY – Jacob Zeno – 2/6, 159 yards, TD
- OKLA – Jalen Hurts – 17/24, 287 yards, TD, INT

Top rushers

- BAY – John Lovett – 3 carries, 19 yards
- OKLA – Kennedy Brooks – 17 carries, 59 yards, TD

Top receivers

- BAY – Trestan Ebner – 2 receptions, 84 yards, TD
- OKLA – CeeDee Lamb – 8 receptions, 173 yards

Statistics	Baylor	Oklahoma
First downs	8	21
Total yards	265	433
Rushing yards	35	146
Passing yards	230	287
Turnovers	0	2
Time of possession	23:24	36:36

=== Vs. Georgia (2020 Sugar Bowl) ===
Georgia vs. Baylor – Game summary

Quarter	1	2	3	4	Total
No. 5 Bulldogs	3	16	7	0	26
No. 7 Bears	0	0	14	0	14

at Mercedes–Benz Superdome, New Orleans, LA

- Date: January 1
- Game time: 7:45 p.m. CDT
- Game weather: N/A (indoors)
- Game attendance: 55,211
- Referee: Jerry McGinn
- TV announcers (ESPN): Sean McDonough and Todd Blackledge

Game information

First quarter

- (00:49) UGA FG – Rodrigo Blankenship 24-yard field goal
  Georgia 3–0; Drive: 6 plays, 74 yards, 2:14

Second quarter

- (12:28) UGA TD – George Pickens 27-yard pass from Jake Fromm, Rodrigo Blankenship kick
  Georgia 10–0; Drive: 8 plays, 85 yards, 2:32
- (08:08) UGA FG – Rodrigo Blankenship 31-yard field goal
  Georgia 13–0; Drive: 9 plays, 45 yards, 3:36
- (01:51) UGA TD – Matt Landers 16-yard pass from Jake Fromm, two-point pass conversion attempt failed
  Georgia 19–0; Drive: 7 plays, 71 yards, 2:52

Third quarter

- (12:14) BAY TD – Denzel Mims 12-yard pass from Charlie Brewer, John Mayers kick
  Georgia 19–7; Drive: 8 plays, 75 yards, 2:46
- (07:16) UGA TD – Zamir White 13-yard rush, Rodrigo Blankenship kick
  Georgia 26–7; Drive: 7 plays, 47 yards, 2:46
- (04:10) BAY TD – Charlie Brewer 1-yard rush, John Mayers kick
  Georgia 26–14; Drive: 8 plays, 75 yards, 3:06

Top passers

- UGA – Jake Fromm – 20/30, 250 yards, 2 TD
- BAY – Charlie Brewer – 24/41, 211 yards, TD, INT

Top rushers

- UGA – Zamir White – 18 carries, 92 yards, TD
- BAY – Trestan Ebner – 5 carries, 23 yards

Top receivers

- UGA – George Pickens – 12 receptions, 175 yards, TD
- BAY – Denzel Mims – 5 receptions, 75 yards, TD

Statistics	Georgia	Baylor
First downs	19	21
Total yards	380	295
Rushing yards	130	61
Passing yards	250	234
Turnovers	0	3
Time of possession	32:23	27:37

== Rankings ==
Ranking movements Legend: ██ Increase in ranking ██ Decrease in ranking — = Not ranked RV = Received votes
	Week																
Poll	Pre	1	2	3	4	5	6	7	8	9	10	11	12	13	14	15	Final
AP	—	—	—	—	—	RV	22	18	14	12	11	12	13	11	8	8	13
Coaches	RV	—	—	—	—	RV	23	18	14	11	10	10	13	10	8	8	12
CFP	Not released										12	13	14	9	7	7	Not released

== Postseason ==
=== All-Big 12 Conference Football Team ===
Offense

1st team

- Denzel Mims - SR, Wide Receiver

2nd team

- Koby Bullard – JR, Fullback
- Sam Tecklenburg – SR, Offensive Lineman

Defensive

1st team

- James Lynch – JR, Defensive Lineman
- Bravvion Roy – SR, Defensive Lineman

2nd team

- Terrel Bernard – SO, Linebacker
- Clay Johnston – SR, Linebacker
- Grayland Arnold – JR, Defensive Back
- Chris Miller – SR, Defensive Back

Honorable Mention

- Charlie Brewer – JR, Quarterback
- JaMycal Hasty – SR, Running Back
- Jameson Houston – SR, Defensive Back
- James Lockhart – SR, Defensive Lineman
- Blake Lynch – SR, Linebacker
- Xavier Newman-Johnson – JR, Offensive Lineman
- Tyquan Thornton – SO, Wide Receiver

=== Postseason Conference Accolades ===
Award	Player	Year	Position
Defensive Player of the Year	James Lynch	JR	Defensive Lineman
Defensive Lineman of the Year	James Lynch	JR	Defensive Lineman
Chuck Neinas Coach of the Year	Matt Rhule	3rd Year	Head coach

=== Players drafted into the NFL ===
Round	Pick	Player	Position	NFL Club
2	59	Denzel Mims	WR	New York Jets
4	130	James Lynch	DE	Minnesota Vikings
6	184	Bravvion Roy	DT	Carolina Panthers
7	234	Clay Johnston	DE	Los Angeles Rams
