= 2019 Big 12 Championship Game =

2019 Dr Pepper Big 12 Championship Game
- 18th Big 12 Conference Championship
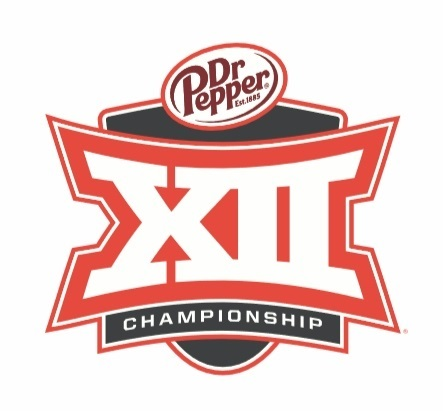
Baylor Bears	Oklahoma Sooners
(11–1)	(11–1)
23	30
Head coach: Matt Rhule	Head coach: Lincoln Riley
AP / Coaches / CFP; 8 / 8 / 7	AP / Coaches / CFP; 6 / 6 / 6
	1	2	3	4	OT	Total
Baylor	0	13	0	10	0	23
Oklahoma	10	0	10	3	7	30
- Date: December 7, 2019
- Season: 2019
- Stadium: AT&T Stadium
- Location: Arlington, Texas
- MVP: CeeDee Lamb
- Favorite: Oklahoma by 9.5
- Referee: Mike Defee
- Attendance: 65,191

United States TV coverage
- Network: ABC, ESPN Radio

International TV coverage
- Announcers: ABC: Sean McDonough (play-by-play), Todd Blackledge (analyst) and Holly Rowe (sideline); ESPN Radio: Marc Kestecher (play-by-play) and Ben Hartsock (analyst)

2019 Big 12 Conference football standings
	Conf.			Overall
Team	W		L	W		L
No. 7 Oklahoma y$^	8	–	1	12	–	2
No. 13 Baylor y	8	–	1	11	–	3
No. 25 Texas	5	–	4	8	–	5
Oklahoma State	5	–	4	8	–	5
Kansas State	5	–	4	8	–	5
Iowa State	5	–	4	7	–	6
West Virginia	3	–	6	5	–	7
TCU	3	–	6	5	–	7
Texas Tech	2	–	7	4	–	8
Kansas	1	–	8	3	–	9
Championship: Oklahoma 30, Baylor 23 ^{OT}
^ – College Football Playoff participant; $ – Conference champion; y – Championship game participant; Rankings from AP Poll

The 2019 Big 12 Championship Game was a college football game played on Saturday, December 7, 2019, at AT&T Stadium in Arlington. This was the 18th Big 12 Championship Game and determined the 2019 champion of the Big 12 Conference. The game featured the top-seeded, Oklahoma Sooners and the second-seeded, Baylor Bears. Sponsored by soft drink brand Dr Pepper, the game is officially known as the Dr Pepper Big 12 Championship Game.

== Previous season ==
The 2018 Big 12 Championship Game featured top-seeded Oklahoma against second-seeded Texas. It was the first time the two rivals had played each other in the conference title game. Texas had won the regular season's Red River Showdown game 48–45. In the championship game, Oklahoma was victorious by a score of 39–27, winning their fourth consecutive and 12th overall Big 12 Conference championship.

== Teams ==
The 2019 Championship Game was contested by Baylor and Oklahoma. The teams had met 29 times previously, with Oklahoma leading the series 26–3. The Sooners came into the game having won five straight meetings, including the 2019 regular-season meeting, which was played in Waco and saw Oklahoma complete the largest comeback in school history by overcoming a 25-point deficit to win 34–31.

=== Baylor ===
The Baylor Bears, led by head coach Matt Rhule, were making their first Big 12 Championship appearance. They were the first team to make their debut in the Big 12 Championship since TCU in 2017.

=== Oklahoma ===
The Oklahoma Sooners, led by Lincoln Riley, were making their eleventh Big 12 Championship appearance; they were 9–1, having won each of their past eight appearances in the conference title game, including both editions played since the Championship game was reinstated for the 2017 season.

== Game summary ==
2019 Big 12 Championship Game

Quarter	1	2	3	4	OT	Total
No. 7 Baylor	0	13	0	10	0	23
No. 6 Oklahoma	10	0	10	3	7	30

at AT&T Stadium • Arlington, Texas

- Date: Saturday, December 7, 2019
- Game time: 12:00 p.m. EST (11:00 a.m. CST)
- Game attendance: 65,191
- Referee: Mike Defee
- TV announcers (ABC): Sean McDonough (play-by-play), Todd Blackledge (analyst) and Holly Rowe (sideline)
- ESPN game summary

Game information

First Quarter

- (9:31) OKLA – Kennedy Brooks 6 yard rush, Gabe Brkic kick (Drive: 3 plays, 78 yards, 1:21; Oklahoma 7–0)
- (4:51) OKLA – Gabe Brkic 44 yard field goal (Drive: 7 plays, 34 yards, 3:06; Oklahoma 10–0)

Second Quarter

- (10:20) BAY – John Mayers 44 yard field goal (Drive: 4 plays, 3 yards, 1:25; Oklahoma 10–3)
- (2:59) BAY – Gerry Bohanon 33 yard pass to Tyquan Thornton, John Mayers kick (Drive: 3 plays, 23 yards, 0:59; Tied 10–10)
- (0:08) BAY – John Mayers 28 yard field goal (Drive: 9 plays, 42 yards, 1:14; Baylor 13–10)

Third Quarter

- (7:53) OKLA – Gabe Brkic 24 yard field goal (Drive: 11 plays, 63 yards, 5:39; Tied 13–13)
- (3:09) OKLA – Jalen Hurts 18 yard pass to Nick Basquine, Gabe Brkic kick (Drive: 8 plays, 74 yards, 3:46; Oklahoma 20–13)

Fourth Quarter

- (10:31) OKLA – Gabe Brkic 24 yard field goal (Drive: 10 plays, 43 yards, 4:43; Oklahoma 23–13)
- (9:41) BAY – Jacob Zeno 81 yard pass to Trestan Ebner, John Mayers kick (Drive: 2 plays, 75 yards, 0:50; Oklahoma 23–20)
- (3:25) BAY – John Mayers 27 yard field goal (Drive: 5 plays, 80 yards, 2:46; Tied 23–23)

Overtime

- (–) OKLA – Rhamondre Stevenson 5 yard rush, Gabe Brkic kick (Drive: 3 plays, 25 yards, Oklahoma 30–23)

=== Statistics ===
Statistics	BAY	OKLA
First downs	8	21
Plays–yards	56–265	74–433
Rushes–yards	29–35	50–146
Passing yards	230	287
Passing: comp–att–int	9–27–0	17–24–1
Turnovers		
Time of possession	23:24	36:36

Team	Category	Player	Statistics
Baylor	Passing	Jacob Zeno	2/6, 159 yards, 1 TD
Baylor	Rushing	John Lovett	3 carries, 19 yards
Baylor	Receiving	Trestan Ebner	2 receptions, 84 yards
Oklahoma	Passing	Jalen Hurts	17/24, 287 yards, 1 TD, 1 INT
Oklahoma	Rushing	Kennedy Brooks	17 carries, 59 yards
Oklahoma	Receiving	CeeDee Lamb	8 receptions, 173 yards

Oklahoma received the opening kick-off, but both teams punted on their first offensive possessions. Oklahoma opened the scoring with a six-yard touchdown run by Kennedy Brooks on a 78-yard drive that featured a 71-yard pass from Jalen Hurts to CeeDee Lamb. After a Baylor fumble, Oklahoma scored again with a 44-yard field goal by Gabe Brkic. In the second quarter, Baylor got on the board with a 44-yard field goal by John Mayers. Baylor starting quarterback Charlie Brewer left the game with an injury after being sacked by Kenneth Murray. Late in the second quarter, Oklahoma's Jalen Hurts was intercepted by Jordan Williams and returned to the OU 23 yard line, after which Baylor tied the game with a 33-yard touchdown pass from backup quarterback Gerry Bohanon to Tyquan Thornton. Baylor took the lead in the final seconds of the half with a 28-yard field goal by Mayers to make the score 13–10.

On Oklahoma's first offensive possession of the second half, the Sooners tied the game with a 24-yard field goal by Gabe Brkic. They then took the lead on the next drive with an 18-yard touchdown pass from Jalen Hurts to Nick Basquine. Early in the fourth quarter, Baylor backup quarterback Gerry Bohanon was also injured. The Sooners took a 10-point lead with another 24-yard field goal by Brkic. Baylor, led by third-string quarterback and true freshman Jacob Zeno, responded with an 81-yard touchdown pass from Zeno to Trestan Ebner. On the next drive, Zeno completed a 78-yard pass to Chris Platt, which set up a 27-yard field goal to tie the game with 3:25 remaining. Oklahoma was forced to punt, and Baylor was unable to score in the final minute, forcing overtime.

In overtime, Oklahoma received the ball first and scored in three plays via a five-yard run by Rhamondre Stevenson. On Baylor's possession, Jacob Zeno was sacked by Nik Bonitto and Jalen Redmond on 3rd and 10, and they failed to convert on 4th and 20, ending the game.

Oklahoma wide receiver CeeDee Lamb had eight receptions for 173 yards and was named game MVP.

== Aftermath ==
Oklahoma, who had been ranked sixth heading into the game, moved up to fourth in the final College Football Playoff rankings, earning them a spot in the CFP semifinal to be played at the Peach Bowl. Facilitating the rise in the rankings was No. 4 Georgia's loss to LSU in the SEC Championship Game and No. 5 Utah's loss to Oregon in the Pac-12 Championship Game. Baylor remained ranked seventh and received a bid to the Sugar Bowl against Georgia. Oklahoma lost to LSU in the Peach Bowl, 63–28; and Baylor lost to Georgia, 26–14.

== See also ==
- List of Big 12 Conference football champions
