= 2020 Sugar Bowl =

Postseason college football bowl game

2020 Allstate Sugar Bowl
- CFP New Year's Six; 86th Sugar Bowl
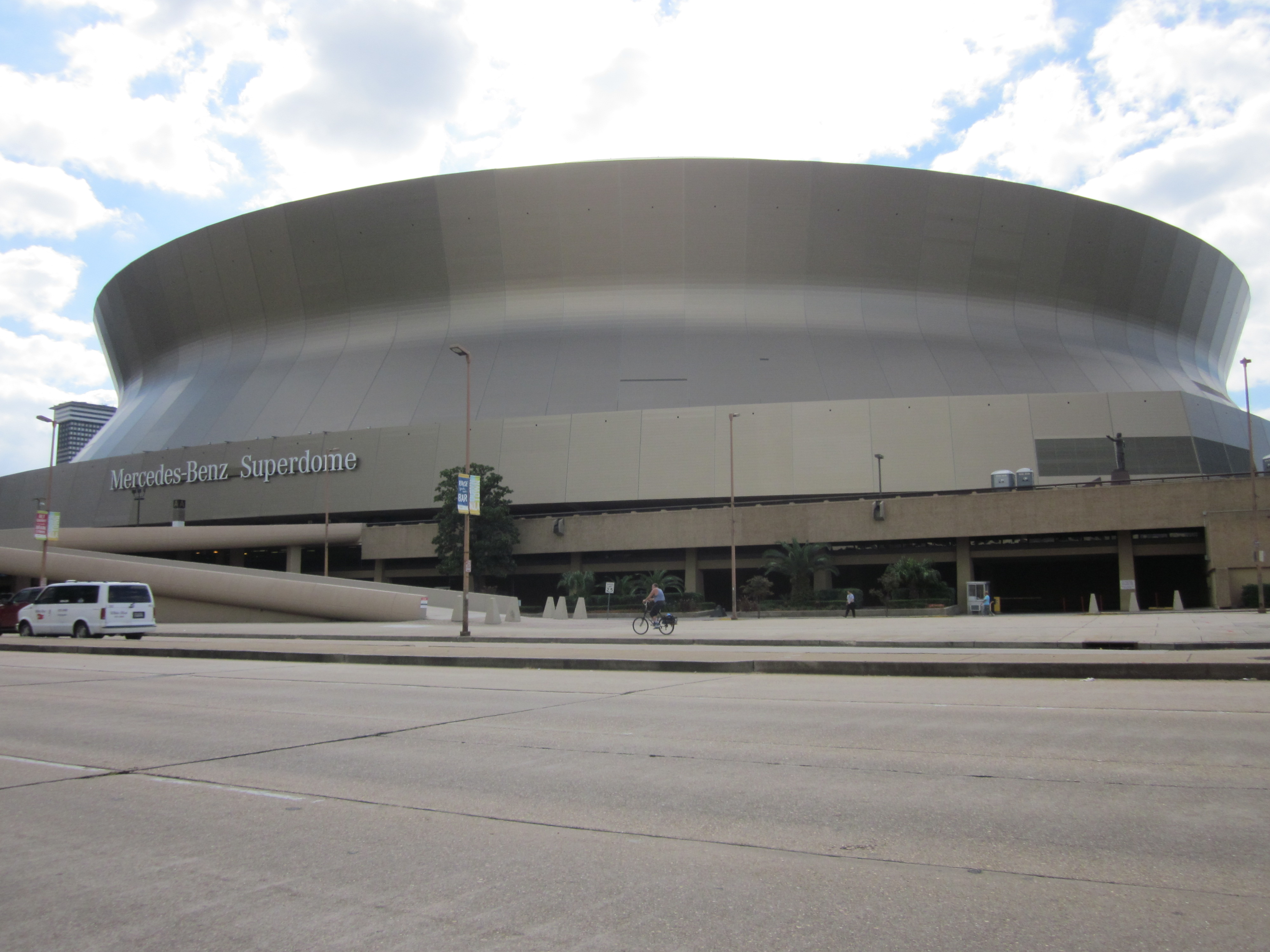
- The Mercedes-Benz Superdome in New Orleans, Louisiana, hosted the Sugar Bowl.
| Georgia Bulldogs | Baylor Bears |
| (11–2) | (11–2) |
| SEC | Big 12 |
| 26 | 14 |
| Head coach: Kirby Smart | Head coach: Matt Rhule |
| AP / Coaches / CFP; 5 / 5 / 5 | AP / Coaches / CFP; 8 / 8 / 7 |
| | 1 | 2 | 3 | 4 | Total |
|---|---|---|---|---|---|
| Georgia | 3 | 16 | 7 | 0 | 26 |
| Baylor | 0 | 0 | 14 | 0 | 14 |
- Date: January 1, 2020
- Season: 2019
- Stadium: Mercedes-Benz Superdome
- Location: New Orleans, Louisiana
- MVP: George Pickens (WR, Georgia)
- Favorite: Georgia by 3
- Referee: Jerry McGinn (Big Ten)
- Attendance: 55,211

United States TV coverage
- Network: ESPN and ESPN Radio
- Announcers: ESPN: Sean McDonough (play-by-play); Todd Blackledge (analyst); Holly Rowe (sideline); ESPN Radio: Sean Kelley, Barrett Jones, Ian Fitzsimmons
- Nielsen ratings: 5.7 (10.22 million viewers)

International TV coverage
- Network: ESPN Deportes

The 2020 Sugar Bowl was a college football bowl game played on January 1, 2020, between the Georgia Bulldogs and Baylor Bears, with kickoff scheduled for 8:45 p.m. EST (7:45 p.m. local CST) on ESPN. It was the 86th edition of the Sugar Bowl, and one of the 2019–20 bowl games concluding the 2019 FBS football season. Sponsored by insurance provider Allstate, the game was officially known as the Allstate Sugar Bowl.

== Teams ==
The game matched the Georgia Bulldogs from the Southeastern Conference (SEC) and the Baylor Bears from the Big 12 Conference. This was the fifth all-time meeting between the two programs; the Bulldogs had won each of the prior four meetings, most recently in 1989.

=== Georgia Bulldogs ===
Georgia entered the game with an 11–2 record (7–1 in conference). They finished atop the SEC's East Division and advanced to the SEC Championship Game, which they lost to LSU, 37–10. As LSU was selected to the College Football Playoff, Georgia was invited as the SEC representative to the Sugar Bowl. The Bulldogs were 3–1 against ranked opponents, defeating Notre Dame, Florida, and Auburn while losing to LSU. Their only other loss was to South Carolina.

This was Georgia's eleventh Sugar Bowl (the third-most of any team); they had a 4–6 record in prior editions of the bowl. It was also Georgia's second consecutive Sugar Bowl, following their 2018 team's loss to Texas in the 2019 edition, 28–21.

=== Baylor Bears ===
Baylor also entered the game with an 11–2 record (8–1 in conference). They finished tied with Oklahoma atop the Big 12, with the Sooners then defeating the Bears in the Big 12 Championship Game, 30–23 in overtime. As Oklahoma was selected to the College Football Playoff, Baylor was invited as the Big 12 representative to the Sugar Bowl. The Bears were 0–2 against ranked opponents, falling to Oklahoma twice.

This was Baylor's second Sugar Bowl, and their first since their 1956 team won the 1957 edition over Tennessee, 13–7.

== Game summary ==
2020 Allstate Sugar Bowl

| Quarter | 1 | 2 | 3 | 4 | Total |
|---|---|---|---|---|---|
| No. 5 Georgia | 3 | 16 | 7 | 0 | 26 |
| No. 7 Baylor | 0 | 0 | 14 | 0 | 14 |

at Mercedes-Benz Superdome • New Orleans, Louisiana

- Date: Wednesday, January 1, 2020
- Game time: 8:45 p.m. EST (7:45 p.m. CST)
- Game weather: n/a (indoors)
- Game attendance: 55,211
- Referee: Jerry McGinn
- TV announcers (ESPN): Sean McDonough (play-by-play), Todd Blackledge (analyst) and Holly Rowe (sideline)
- ESPN game summary

Game information

First Quarter

- (0:49) UGA – Rodrigo Blankenship 24 yard field goal (Drive: 6 plays, 74 yards, 2:14; Georgia 3–0)

Second Quarter

- (12:28) UGA – Jake Fromm 27 yard pass to George Pickens, Rodrigo Blankenship kick (Drive: 8 plays, 85 yards, 2:32; Georgia 10–0)
- (8:08) UGA – Rodrigo Blankenship 31 yard field goal (Drive: 9 plays, 45 yards, 3:36; Georgia 13–0)
- (1:51) UGA – Jake Fromm 16 yard pass to Matt Landers, two-point conversion pass incomplete (Drive: 7 plays, 71 yards, 2:52; Georgia 19–0)

Third Quarter

- (12:14) BAY – Charlie Brewer 12 yard pass to Denzel Mims, John Mayers kick (Drive: 8 plays, 75 yards, 2:46; Georgia 19–7)
- (7:16) UGA – Zamir White 13 yard rush, Rodrigo Blankenship kick (Drive: 7 plays, 47 yards, 2:46; Georgia 26–7)
- (4:10) BAY – Charlie Brewer 1 yard rush, John Mayers kick (Drive: 8 plays, 75 yards, 3:06; Georgia 26–14)

Fourth Quarter
No scoring

=== Statistics ===
| Statistics | UGA | BAY |
|---|---|---|
| First downs | 19 | 21 |
| Plays–yards | 70–380 | 78–295 |
| Rushes–yards | 40–130 | 28–61 |
| Passing yards | 250 | 234 |
| Passing: comp–att–int | 20–30–0 | 28–50–2 |
| Time of possession | 32:23 | 27:37 |

| Team | Category | Player | Statistics |
|---|---|---|---|
| Georgia | Passing | Jake Fromm | 20/30, 250 yards, 2 TD |
| Georgia | Rushing | Zamir White | 18 carries, 92 yards, 1 TD |
| Georgia | Receiving | George Pickens | 12 receptions, 175 yards, 1 TD |
| Baylor | Passing | Charlie Brewer | 24/41, 211 yards, 1 TD, 1 INT |
| Baylor | Rushing | Trestan Ebner | 5 carries, 23 yards |
| Baylor | Receiving | Denzel Mims | 5 receptions, 75 yards, 1 TD |
