= JaMycal Hasty =

American football player (born 1996)

Profile
- Positions: Running back, return specialist

Personal information
- Born: September 12, 1996 (age 30); Longview, Texas, U.S.
- Listed height: 5 ft 8 in (1.73 m)
- Listed weight: 205 lb (93 kg)

Career information
- High school: Longview
- College: Baylor (2015–2019)
- NFL draft: 2020: undrafted

Career history
- San Francisco 49ers (2020–2021); Jacksonville Jaguars (2022–2023); New England Patriots (2023–2024); Miami Dolphins (2025)*; New England Patriots (2026)*
- * Offseason or practice squad member only

Career NFL statistics
- Rushing yards: 479
- Rushing average: 4
- Rushing touchdowns: 4
- Receptions: 60
- Receiving yards: 375
- Receiving touchdowns: 2
- Stats at Pro Football Reference

JaMycal Hasty (born September 12, 1996) is an American professional football running back and return specialist. He played college football for the Baylor Bears.

== College career ==
A 4-star running back recruit from Longview, Texas, Hasty committed to Baylor to play college football over offers from Houston, Mississippi State, Oklahoma State, Oregon, TCU, Texas, and Texas Tech.

Due to a back injury, Hasty redshirted his true freshman season. As a redshirt freshman, he rushed for 623 yards and three touchdowns on 119 carries. Injuries limited him to eight games (three starts) as a redshirt sophomore, rushing for 314 yards and one touchdown on 76 carries, along with 25 receptions for 105 yards.

As a redshirt junior in 2018, Hasty played in 11 games, starting 10 of them. He ran for 434 yards and four touchdowns on 82 carries, and caught 26 passes for 170 yards and a touchdown. As a redshirt senior in 2019, Hasty played in all 14 games (three starts), rushing for 627 yards and seven touchdowns on 109 carries along with 25 receptions for 184 yards. Hasty was named Honorable Mention All-Big 12 for his efforts. In 45 career games at Baylor (16 starts), Hasty recorded 386 carries for 1,998 yards and 15 touchdowns, along with 79 receptions for 485 yards and one touchdown.

=== College statistics ===
Season	Team	GP	Rushing				Receiving			
Season	Team	GP	Att	Yds	Avg	TD	Rec	Yds	Avg	TD
2016	Baylor	12	119	623	5.2	3	3	26	8.7	0
2017	Baylor	8	76	314	4.1	1	25	105	4.2	0
2018	Baylor	11	82	434	5.3	4	26	170	6.5	1
2019	Baylor	14	109	627	5.8	7	25	184	7.4	0
Career		45	386	1,998	5.2	15	79	485	6.1	1

== Professional career ==
Pre-draft measurables
Height	Weight	Arm length	Hand span	Wingspan	40-yard dash	10-yard split	20-yard split	20-yard shuttle	Vertical jump	Broad jump	Bench press
5 ft 8 in (1.73 m)	205 lb (93 kg)	31 1/8 in (0.79 m)	9 1/8 in (0.23 m)	6 ft 2 1/2 in (1.89 m)	4.55 s	1.53 s	2.67 s	4.03 s	39.0 in (0.99 m)	10 ft 3 in (3.12 m)	15 reps
All values from NFL Combine

=== San Francisco 49ers ===
Hasty signed with the San Francisco 49ers as an undrafted free agent on April 27, 2020. On September 5, he was released by the 49ers as part of final roster cuts and signed to the practice squad the following day. In Week 3 against the New York Giants, he was elevated to the active roster and reverted to the practice squad after the game. He made his NFL debut in the game, catching one pass and rushing twice for nine yards. Hasty was promoted to the active roster on October 3. In Week 8 against the Seattle Seahawks, he recorded his first career rushing touchdown. On November 17, Hasty was placed on injured reserve.

On September 25, 2021, Hasty was placed on injured reserve after suffering a high ankle sprain in Week 2. He was activated on October 23.

On March 10, 2022, Hasty re-signed with the 49ers. On August 30, Hasty was waived by the 49ers as part of final roster cuts.

=== Jacksonville Jaguars ===
On August 31, 2022, Hasty was claimed off waivers by the Jacksonville Jaguars. After playing minimal snaps for the first seven weeks of the season, he was named second-string running back behind Travis Etienne following the trade of James Robinson to the New York Jets. He finished the 2022 season with 194 rushing yards and two touchdown runs, along with 20 catches for 126 yards and one passing touchdown.

On February 26, 2023, the Jaguars signed Hasty to a contract extension. Hasty entered the 2023 season as fourth on the depth chart behind Etienne, rookie Tank Bigsby, and newly signed D'Ernest Johnson. On November 11, Hasty was waived by the Jaguars.

=== New England Patriots (first stint) ===
On November 13, 2023, Hasty was claimed off waivers by the New England Patriots.

On October 20, 2024, Hasty caught a touchdown from quarterback Drake Maye against the Jaguars in London. He made 15 appearances for New England during the season, recording 20 carries for 69 yards and 10 receptions for 59 yards.

On August 5, 2025, after being in free agency, Hasty re-signed with the Patriots. On August 26, he was released as part of final roster cuts.

=== Miami Dolphins ===
On August 28, 2025, Hasty was signed to the Miami Dolphins' practice squad.

=== New England Patriots (second stint) ===
On August 13, 2026, Hasty signed with the New England Patriots. On August 30, Hasty was released by the Patriots as a part of final roster cuts.
