= Charlie Brewer =

American football player (born 1998)

Syracuse Orange
- Title: Assistant quarterbacks coach

Personal information
- Born: November 26, 1998 (age 27)
- Listed height: 6 ft 1 in (1.85 m)
- Listed weight: 210 lb (95 kg)

Career information
- High school: Lake Travis (Austin, Texas)
- College: Baylor (2017−2020); Utah (2021); Liberty (2022)
- NFL draft: 2023: undrafted

Career history

Playing
- Ottawa Redblacks (2023)*; Nashville Kats (2024)
- * Offseason or practice squad member only

Coaching
- Bowling Green (2024) Quality control coach; North Texas (2025) Offensive graduate assistant; Syracuse (2026–present) Assistant quarterbacks coach

Awards and highlights
- Big 12 co-Offensive Freshman of the Year (2017)
- Stats at CFL.ca

Charlie Brewer (born November 26, 1998) is an American football coach and former quarterback. He played college football for the Baylor Bears, Utah Utes and Liberty Flames. He was a member of the Ottawa Redblacks of the Canadian Football League (CFL).

== Early life ==
Brewer grew up in Austin, Texas and attended Lake Travis High School. As a senior, Brewer was named the Associated Press Texas Player of the Year after setting a national high school record with a 77.4% completion rate on 340 pass attempts for 3,908 yards and 54 touchdowns against three interceptions and ran for 746 yards and nine touchdowns on 88 attempts in a season in which Lake Travis won the Class 6A State Championship. Brewer initially committed to play college football at SMU, but flipped his commitment to Baylor at the end of his senior season.

== College career ==
Brewer became Baylor's starting quarterback eight games into his freshman season. He started the final four games of the season and was named the Big 12 Conference co-Offensive Freshman of the Year after completing 68.1% of his passes for 1,562 yards with 11 touchdowns and four interceptions. Brewer started 12 of Baylor's 13 games and passed for 3,019 yards and 19 touchdowns with an additional 375 yards and 7 touchdowns rushing as the Bears won seven games in his sophomore season.

Brewer was named honorable mention All-Big 12 after completing 215-of-389 pass attempts for 3,161 yards and 21 touchdowns with seven interceptions while also gaining 344 yards on 147 carries with a team-high 11 touchdowns as the Bears went 11–1 in the regular season and made the 2019 Big 12 Championship Game. He started the game, but was taken out after suffering a concussion early in the second quarter as the Bears went on to lose to Oklahoma 30–23 in overtime. Brewer returned to start the 2020 Sugar Bowl against Georgia and completed 24-of-41 passes for 211 yards, one touchdown and one interception before again leaving the game to injury after taking a late hit. As a senior, he completed 61.7% of his passes for 1,958 yards with 14 touchdowns and eight interceptions in nine games during a COVID-19-shortened season. At Baylor, Brewer threw for 9,700 yards and 65 touchdowns and also rushed for 1,039 yards and 22 touchdowns in 44 games played.

After graduating from Baylor, Brewer opted to enter the transfer portal and utilize the extra year of eligibility granted to college athletes who played in the 2020 season due to the coronavirus pandemic. He later announced that he would be transferring to Utah as a graduate transfer. Brewer was named the Utes' starting quarterback going into the 2021 season. Brewer started the first three games of the season before leaving the program after he was benched during a 33–31 triple-overtime loss to San Diego State. He completed 48 of 79 pass attempts for 484 yards and three touchdowns and three interceptions while at Utah.

On December 11, 2021, Brewer announced that he was transferring to Liberty University for the 2022 season. He was named the Flames' starting quarterback prior to the start of the season. Brewer broke his hand in the first quarter of Liberty's season opener against Southern Miss.

=== Statistics ===
Year	Team	GP	Passing								Rushing			
Year	Team	GP	Cmp	Att	Pct	Yds	Y/A	TD	Int	Rtg	Att	Yds	Avg	TD
2017	Baylor	8	139	204	68.1	1,562	7.7	11	4	146.3	65	166	2.6	0
2018	Baylor	13	240	390	61.5	3,019	7.7	19	9	138.0	133	375	2.8	7
2019	Baylor	14	251	389	64.5	3,161	8.1	21	7	147.0	147	344	2.3	11
2020	Baylor	9	198	321	61.7	1,958	6.1	14	8	122.3	107	154	1.4	4
2021	Utah	3	48	79	60.8	484	6.1	3	3	117.2	12	16	1.3	0
2022	Liberty	3	8	13	61.5	52	4.0	0	1	79.8	7	23	3.3	0
Career		50	884	1,396	63.3	10,236	7.3	68	32	136.4	471	1,078	2.3	22

== Professional career ==
=== Ottawa Redblacks ===
On May 4, 2023, Brewer signed a contract with the Ottawa Redblacks of the Canadian Football League (CFL). He was released by the Redblacks during the first week of training camp on May 16.

=== Nashville Kats ===
On February 20, 2024, Brewer signed with the Nashville Kats of Arena Football One for the 2024 season.

== Coaching career ==
Brewer retired from playing in 2024 and took a position as a quality control coach at Bowling Green. After one season, he left Bowling Green to become a graduate assistant at North Texas. Brewer was hired as the assistant quarterbacks coach at Syracuse in 2026.

== Personal life ==
Brewer's father, Robert Brewer, was the starting quarterback for the University of Texas and was the MVP of the 1982 Cotton Bowl. His grandfather, Charley Brewer, and uncle, Rob Moerschell were also quarterbacks for Texas. Brewer's brother, Michael Brewer, played quarterback at Texas Tech and Virginia Tech.
