= Zamir White =

American football player (born 1999)

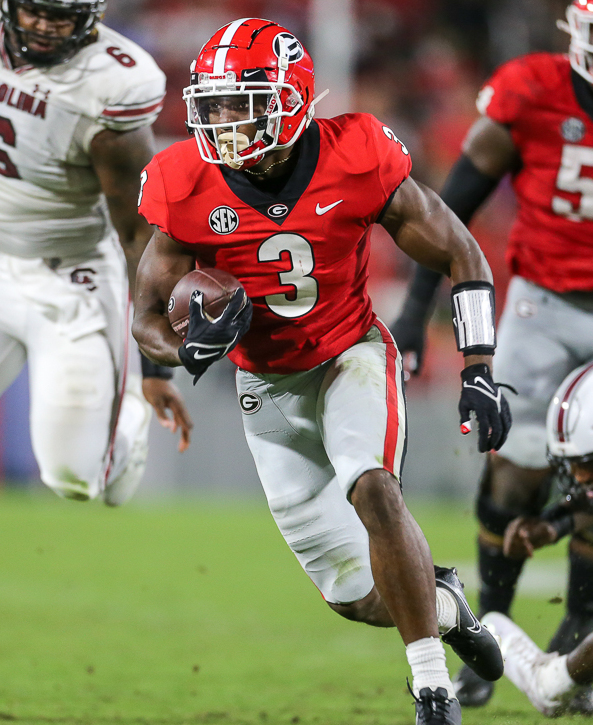
- White with the Georgia Bulldogs in 2021

No. 26 – New Orleans Saints
- Positions: Running back, kickoff returner
- Roster status: Practice squad

Personal information
- Born: September 18, 1999 (age 27); Laurinburg, North Carolina, U.S.
- Listed height: 6 ft 0 in (1.83 m)
- Listed weight: 227 lb (103 kg)

Career information
- High school: Scotland (Laurinburg)
- College: Georgia (2018–2021)
- NFL draft: 2022: 4th round, 122nd overall pick

Career history
- Las Vegas Raiders (2022–2025); San Francisco 49ers (2026)*; New Orleans Saints (2026–present)
- * Offseason or practice squad member only

Awards and highlights
- CFP national champion (2021)

Career NFL statistics as of Week 9, 2026
- Rushing yards: 741
- Rushing average: 3.7
- Rushing touchdowns: 2
- Receptions: 25
- Receiving yards: 152
- Return yards: 294
- Stats at Pro Football Reference

Zamir Alexza White (born September 18, 1999), nicknamed "Zeus", is an American professional football running back for the New Orleans Saints of the National Football League (NFL). He played college football for the Georgia Bulldogs and was selected by the Las Vegas Raiders in the fourth round of the 2022 NFL draft.

== Early life ==
White grew up in Laurinburg, North Carolina and attended Scotland High School, where he was a member of the football and track teams. As a senior, White rushed for 2,086 yards (14.1 yards per carry) and 34 touchdowns and won the Sam B. Nicola Award as the national high school player of the year before tearing his ACL in the second round of the state playoffs. White was a consensus top-five recruit at the running back position and committed to play college football at Georgia over offers from Alabama, Clemson, North Carolina and Ohio State.

== College career ==
White redshirted his true freshman season after suffering a second torn ACL during summer training camp. White scored the first touchdown of his college career on September 7, 2019, against Murray State in an eight carry, 72 yard effort in a 63–17 win. He rushed for a season high 92 yards and one touchdown on 18 carries against Baylor in the 2020 Sugar Bowl. White finished his redshirt freshman season with 408 yards and three touchdowns on 78 carries with two receptions for 20 yards. In the shortened 2020 season, White was Georgia's leading rusher with 779 yards and 11 touchdowns on 144 carries. In 2021, White again led all Georgia running backs—a platoon that included James Cook, Kenny McIntosh, and Kendall Milton—with 856 yards and 11 touchdowns on 160 carries. On January 14, 2022, White declared for the 2022 NFL draft.

=== Statistics ===
Year	G	Rushing				Receiving			
Year	G	Att	Yds	Avg	TD	Rec	Yds	Avg	TD
2019	13	78	408	5.2	3	2	20	10.0	0
2020	10	144	779	5.4	11	6	37	6.2	0
2021	15	160	856	5.4	11	9	75	8.3	0
Career	38	382	2,043	5.3	25	17	132	7.8	0

== Professional career ==
Pre-draft measurables
Height	Weight	Arm length	Hand span	Wingspan	40-yard dash	10-yard split	20-yard split	Vertical jump	Broad jump
5 ft 11 3/4 in (1.82 m)	214 lb (97 kg)	31 1/2 in (0.80 m)	8 1/2 in (0.22 m)	6 ft 2 5/8 in (1.90 m)	4.40 s	1.51 s	2.54 s	33.5 in (0.85 m)	10 ft 8 in (3.25 m)
All values from NFL Combine

=== Las Vegas Raiders ===
White was selected in the fourth round (122nd overall) by the Las Vegas Raiders in the 2022 NFL draft. On June 8, 2022, White signed his rookie contract for the Raiders. As a rookie, White appeared in 14 games and had 17 carries for 70 yards.

==== 2023 ====
White made his first career start in Week 15 of the 2023 season against the Los Angeles Chargers after starter Josh Jacobs was ruled out due to an injury. In the game, he rushed 17 times for 69 yards and his first career touchdown. In the following game against the Chiefs, he had 22 carries for 145 yards in the 20–14 victory. In Week 18 against the Broncos, he had 25 carries for 112 yards in the 27–14 victory. In the 2023 season, he appeared in all 17 games and made four starts. He finished with 104 carries for 451 yards and one touchdown.

==== 2024 ====
In Week 9, White recorded his first touchdown of the season in the 41-24 loss against the Cincinnati Bengals. In Week 11, White suffered a quadricep injury in the 34-19 loss against the Miami Dolphins. He missed Week 12's matchup against Denver Broncos and Week 13's matchup against Kansas City Chiefs. On December 10, the Las Vegas Raiders placed White on injured reserve, ending his season.

=== San Francisco 49ers ===
On August 12, 2026, White signed a one-year contract with San Francisco 49ers.

=== New Orleans Saints ===
On August 24, 2026, White was traded to New Orleans Saints in exchange for Deion Jones. On August 30, White was released by the Saints as a part of final roster cuts; he was re–signed to the team's practice squad the following day.

== NFL career statistics ==
Legend
**Bold**	Career high

=== Regular season ===
Year	Team	Games		Rushing					Receiving					Kick returns					Fumbles	
Year	Team	GP	GS	Att	Yds	Avg	Lng	TD	Rec	Yds	Avg	Lng	TD	Ret	Yds	Avg	Lng	TD	Fum	Lost
2022	LV	14	0	17	70	4.1	22	0	0	0	0.0	0	0	0	0	0.0	0	0	0	0
2023	LV	**17**	4	**104**	**451**	**4.3**	**43**	**1**	**15**	**98**	**6.5**	**15**	0	0	0	0.0	0	0	1	1
2024	LV	8	**5**	65	183	2.8	17	**1**	6	30	5.0	14	0	0	0	0.0	0	0	**2**	**2**
2025	LV	6	0	12	32	2.7	9	0	4	24	6.0	9	0	**11**	**294**	**26.7**	**34**	0	0	0
2026	NOR	1	0	1	5	5.0	5	0	0	0	0.0	0	0	2	49	24.5	25	0	0	0
Career		46	9	199	741	3.7	43	2	25	152	6.1	15	0	13	343	26.4	34	0	3	3
