= Frank Okam =

American football player and coach (born 1985)

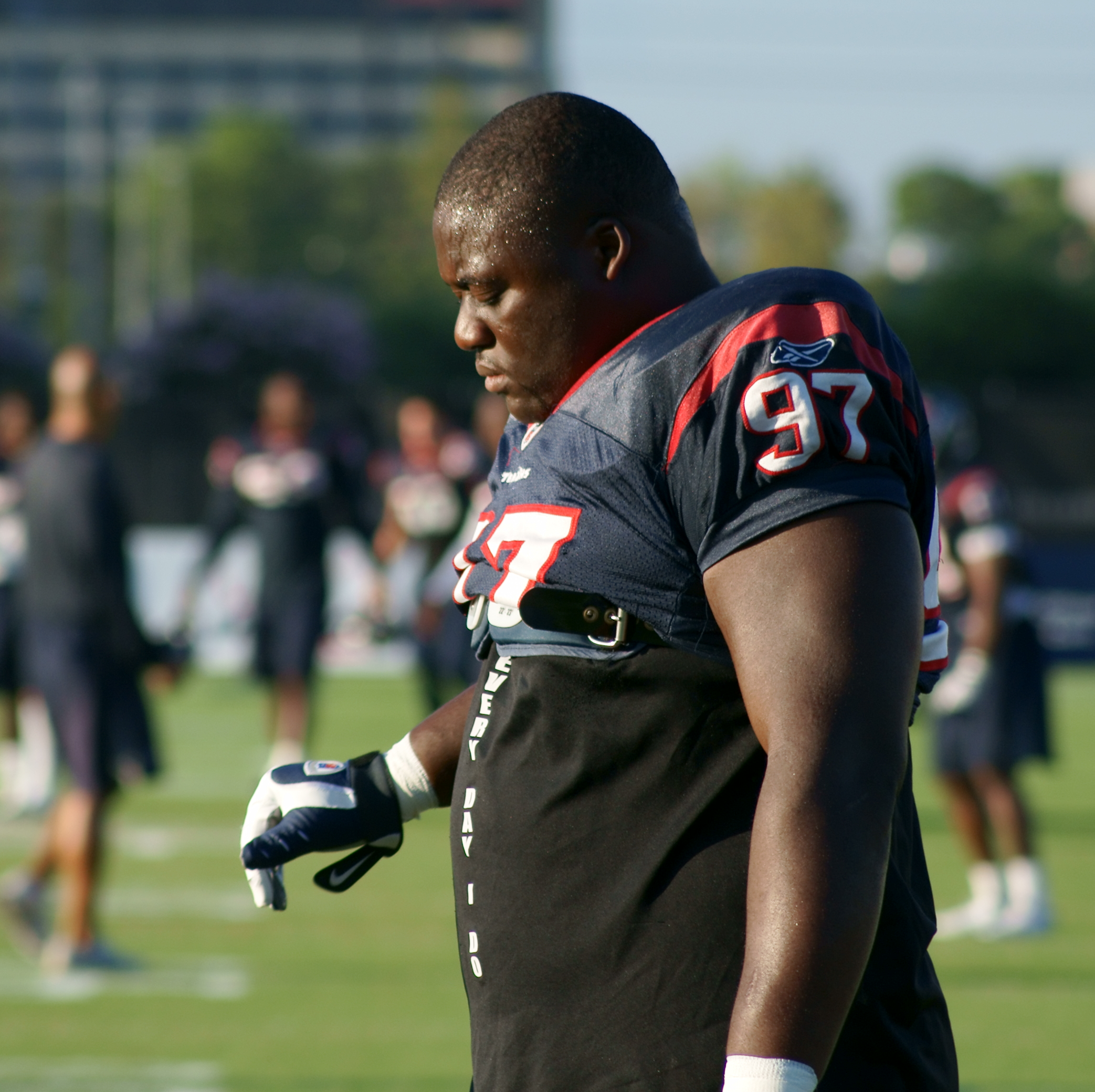
- Okam with the Houston Texans in 2010

Houston Texans
- Title: Assistant defensive line coach

Personal information
- Born: October 16, 1985 (age 41); Pine Bluff, Arkansas, U.S.
- Listed height: 6 ft 5 in (1.96 m)
- Listed weight: 350 lb (159 kg)

Career information
- Position: Defensive tackle (No. 97, 78, 98)
- High school: Lake Highlands (Dallas, Texas)
- College: Texas
- NFL draft: 2008: 5th round, 151st overall pick

Career history

Playing
- Houston Texans (2008–2010); Seattle Seahawks (2010); Tampa Bay Buccaneers (2010–2011); Omaha Nighthawks (2012); New York Giants (2013)*
- * Offseason or practice squad member only

Coaching
- Rice (2014–2015) Graduate assistant; Rice (2016–2017) Defensive line coach; Baylor (2018–2019) Defensive line coach; Carolina Panthers (2020) Assistant defensive line coach; Carolina Panthers (2021) Defensive line coach; Las Vegas Raiders (2022) Defensive line coach; Toledo (2023–2024) Defensive line coach; Houston Texans (2025–present) Assistant defensive line coach

Awards and highlights
- BCS national champion (2005); Third-team All-American (2007); Freshman All-American (2004); 2× Second-team All-Big 12 (2005, 2007)

Career NFL statistics
- Total tackles: 33
- Fumble recoveries: 1
- Stats at Pro Football Reference

Franklin Nonyelu Okam, Jr. (born October 16, 1985) is an American football coach and former defensive tackle who currently serves as the assistant defensive line coach for the Houston Texans of the National Football League (NFL). Okam played college football for the Texas Longhorns and was selected by the Texans in the fifth round of the 2008 NFL draft. He also was a member of the Seattle Seahawks, Tampa Bay Buccaneers, Omaha Nighthawks, New York Giants, and Carolina Panthers.

== Early life ==
Of Nigerian descent, Okam attended Lake Highlands High School in Dallas, Texas, where he competed in football where he was an all-district, all-area, & all-state. He also competed in basketball where his team finished as Region II semifinalists. Okam also competed in track & field where was a state finalist in discus, all while holding a 3.9 GPA. As a senior at Lake Highlands, Okam achieved a 345 lb (156 kg) bench max, 500 lb (230 kg) squat max, 29 inch vertical, and an impressive 4.9 40-yard dash for a man of his size. He weighed in at 300 pounds (140 kg) on a 6 ft 5 in (1.96 m) frame. Okam was highly recruited as the second ranked defensive tackle in the nation, Okam received scholarship offers from Florida, Oklahoma, Oklahoma State, and Stanford among other universities. He was a Parade All American. He played in the U.S. Army All-American Bowl and the Oil Bowl in which he got Defensive MVP following his senior season.

== Playing career ==
=== College ===
Okam accepted a scholarship to the University of Texas at Austin, where he played defensive tackle for the Texas Longhorns football team from 2004 to 2007. Okam contributed immediately as a true freshman, earning first-team Freshman All-American honors from Sporting News.

As a sophomore, he started all 13 games at nose tackle and earned second-team All-Big 12 honors from the league's coaches. He made five tackles, including his first sack of the season, in Texas' 41–38 victory over USC for the 2005–06 National Championship.

As a junior, he started 11 games and earned honorable mention All-Big 12 honors from the Associated Press, and he made the 2006 ESPN first-team All-American squad.

In their 2007-season preview magazine, CBS Sportsline.com said, "Frank Okam should be one of the top players in the country" during his senior season with the 2007 Texas Longhorns football team.

After a stellar senior season, Okam finished his career at the University of Texas with 160 total tackles, 81 solo tackles with 28 tackles for a loss. In addition, Okam finished his career with 10 sacks, a forced fumble, 5 recovered fumbles, and 12 deflected passes.

=== National Football League ===
==== Houston Texans ====
Pre-draft measurables
Height	Weight	Arm length	Hand span	40-yard dash	10-yard split	20-yard split	20-yard shuttle	Three-cone drill	Vertical jump	Broad jump	Bench press	Wonderlic
6 ft 4 1/2 in (1.94 m)	347 lb (157 kg)	34 3/4 in (0.88 m)	11 1/8 in (0.28 m)	5.27 s	1.83 s	3.02 s	4.66 s	8.07 s	27.5 in (0.70 m)	8 ft 8 in (2.64 m)	32 reps	39
All values from 2008 NFL Combine/Pro Day

Okam was selected by the Houston Texans in the fifth round (151st overall) of the 2008 NFL draft.

He was waived on October 25, 2010.

==== Seattle Seahawks ====
Okam signed with the Seattle Seahawks on November 2, 2010.

==== Tampa Bay Buccaneers ====
The Tampa Bay Buccaneers signed Okam as a free agent after he was cut by the Seattle Seahawks. He was waived on November 22, 2011, and re-signed to the team's practice squad the following day.

He was then cut again by the Tampa Bay Buccaneers on Aug 31, 2012.

==== New York Giants ====
He was signed by the New York Giants on May 11, 2013 after a veteran tryout at the rookie minicamp. On August 25, 2013, he was cut by the Giants.

== Coaching career ==
=== Rice University ===
In 2014, Okam began his coaching career as a graduate assistant at Rice University. In his 1st season working with the defensive line, Rice's defensive line broke the school record for most sacks in a season. Led by Zach Patt and Brian Nordstrom who finished 3rd and 4th respectively on Rice's single season sack list. Brian Nordstrom garnered 1st team All C-USA honors as well as finishing the season as the C-USA TFL leader. Patt set a school record 5 sacks and 3 FF in a game vs FIU and was National Player of the Week. Rice broke the record during the 2014 Hawai'i Bowl vs Fresno State. In 2016, he was promoted to defensive line coach. In 2017, Rice's defensive line was one of the top in C-USA. Roe Wilkins led all interior C-USA lineman with 6.5 sacks. That would put him 10th all time on Rice's single season sack list. Brian Womac earned 1st team All C-USA honors and led the team with 10 sacks and broke the school record with 22 TFLs. Womac's 10 sacks are second all time on Rice's single season sack list. Womac signed as a free agent with the Los Angeles Rams following his 2017 season.

=== Baylor University ===
In 2018, Okam was hired as the defensive line coach at Baylor University. During the 2018 season, Baylor's Defensive Line improved and seniors, Ira Lewis and Greg Roberts signed as free agents and made NFL rosters the next season playing for the Houston Texans and the Green Bay Packers, respectively. In 2019, Baylor had one of the top defensive line's in the country. Okam was up for the Football Scoop Defensive Line Coach of the Year Honors. Under Okam's tutelage, and led by James Lynch and Bravvion Roy, Baylor's defensive line broke the school's sack record with 46 sacks. They also led the country with 23 sacks while only rushing 3 defensive lineman. Roy made 61 tackles including 13 tackles-for-loss, 5.5 sacks, one forced fumble, seven QB hurries, and one blocked kick. He was named to the first-team All-Big 12. Roy was selected in the 6th round of the 2020 NFL draft to the Carolina Panthers. Lynch was named preseason first-team All-Big 12 and to the Chuck Bednarik Award watchlist entering his junior season. Lynch was named first-team All-Big 12, the Big 12 Defensive Lineman of the Year, the conference Defensive Player of the Year and was a unanimous All-America selection after finishing the regular season with 41 tackles, 19.5 tackles for loss and a conference-high 13.5 sacks along with three forced fumbles, two fumble recoveries, five passes defended and two blocked kicks. Lynch's 13.5 sacks broke a Baylor school record. Lynch was selected in the 4th round of the 2020 NFL draft to the Minnesota Vikings.

=== Carolina Panthers ===
On January 20, 2020, Okam was hired by the Carolina Panthers as their assistant defensive line coach, reuniting with head coach Matt Rhule. During the 2020 Season, Okam helped tutor 1st round pick Derrick Brown, 2nd round pick Yetur Gross-Matos, and 6th round pick Bravvion Roy. Several Panther defensive lineman recorded career years in sack production including Brian Burns, Efe Obada, and Marquis Haynes.

In February 2021, Okam was promoted to head defensive line coach for the Carolina Panthers. Okam coached and mentored 2021 NFL Draft picks Daviyon Nixon, 5th round pick and Phil Hoskins, 7th round pick. Nixon appeared in 7 games with 9 total tackles with .5 sacks. Hoskins finished with 4 tackles and 1 sack.

• 2nd year DL Derrick Brown set career-highs in sacks (3.0) and total tackles (41) in 2021 • 2nd year DL Yetur Gross-Matos set career-highs in games played (14) and sacks (3.5) and total tackles in 2021

Brian Burns was selected as a Pro Bowl Starter for the NFC for the 2021 Pro Bowl. Burns tied his career high in sacks set in 2020.

• Helped improve Carolina's defensive unit YOY, 2020 vs. 2021: Rushing Yards Per Game: 121.0 vs. 113.8

Passing Yards Per Game: 239.1 vs. 192.1 (4th NFL)

Points Per Game: 25.1 vs. 23.8

Total Sacks: 29 vs. 39

3rd Down Conv. Rate: 49.3% (31st NFL) vs. 37.8% (9th NFL)

Carolina finished with the #2 defense in the NFL

=== Las Vegas Raiders ===
On February 17, 2022, Josh McDaniels and the Las Vegas Raiders hired Okam to be their defensive line coach. Okam was let go on February 19, 2023, after one season with the Raiders. Maxx Crosby finished with career highs in sacks and tackles for loss. Andrew Billings also had a career year statistically.

=== Toledo Rockets ===
On June 6, 2023, Toledo hired Okam be their new defensive line coach. In 2023, Toledo finished 27th in the country in total defense. Toledo was 11th in the country in total sacks with 39 and ranked top 10 in the country in forced fumbles per game, with 14. Judge Culpepper was 1st Team All-MAC and finished the year with 9.0 sacks. Darius Alexander was 3rd Team All-MAC. Toledo had 10 defensive lineman with at least 1.0 sacks in the season.

=== Houston Texans ===
On February 16, 2025, the Houston Texans hired Okam to serve as their assistant defensive line coach.
