= Tyquan Thornton =

American football player (born 2000)

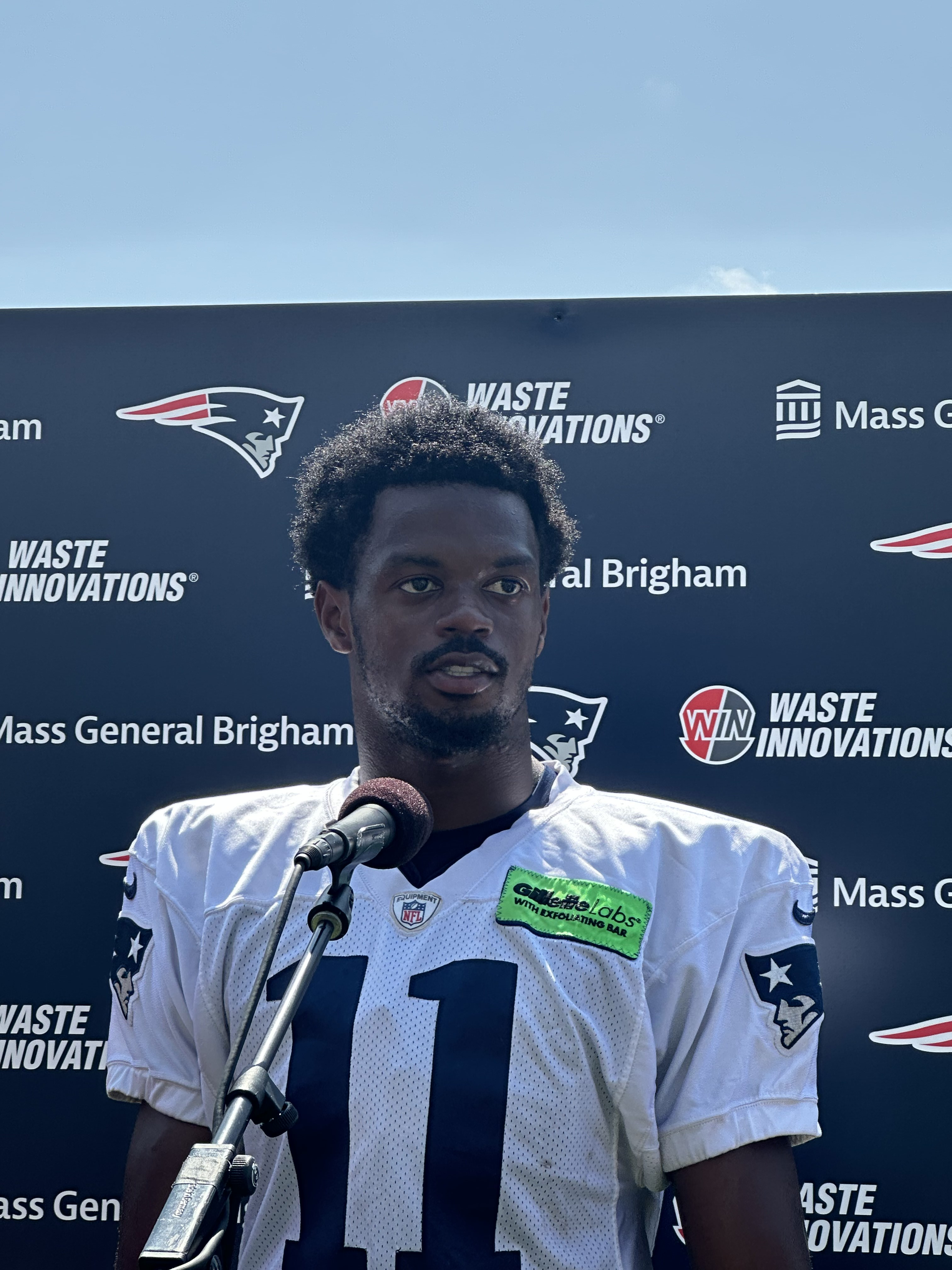
- Thornton with the New England Patriots in 2023

No. 2 – Kansas City Chiefs
- Position: Wide receiver
- Roster status: Injured reserve

Personal information
- Born: August 7, 2000 (age 26); Miami, Florida, U.S.
- Listed height: 6 ft 2 in (1.88 m)
- Listed weight: 185 lb (84 kg)

Career information
- High school: Booker T. Washington (Miami)
- College: Baylor (2018–2021)
- NFL draft: 2022: 2nd round, 50th overall pick

Career history
- New England Patriots (2022–2024); Kansas City Chiefs (2024–present)

Awards and highlights
- Second-team All-Big 12 (2021)

Career NFL statistics as of 2026
- Receptions: 69
- Receiving yards: 1,042
- Receiving touchdowns: 7
- Rushing yards: 67
- Rushing touchdowns: 1
- Stats at Pro Football Reference

Tyquan Thornton (born August 7, 2000) is an American professional football wide receiver for the Kansas City Chiefs of the National Football League (NFL). He played college football for the Baylor Bears and was selected by the New England Patriots in the second round of the 2022 NFL draft.

== Early life ==
Thornton attended Booker T. Washington Senior High School in Miami, Florida.

== College career ==
Thornton originally committed to the University of Florida to play college football before flipping his commitment to Baylor University.

Thornton attended Baylor from 2018 to 2022. During his career he had 143 receptions for 2,242 yards and 19 touchdowns.

=== College statistics ===
Year	Team	GP	Receiving				Rushing			
Year	Team	GP	Rec	Yds	Avg	TD	Att	Yds	Avg	TD
2018	Baylor	13	20	354	17.7	3	2	2	1.0	0
2019	Baylor	14	45	782	17.4	5	0	0	0.0	0
2020	Baylor	6	16	158	9.9	1	0	0	0.0	0
2021	Baylor	14	62	948	15.3	10	1	-11	-11.0	0
Career		47	143	2,242	15.7	19	3	-9	-3.0	0

== Professional career ==
At the 2022 NFL Combine, Thornton ran an unofficial 4.21 in the 40-yard dash. It would have been an NFL combine record, but it was ruled that he ran a 4.28 instead, which was the third-fastest in the 2022 combine.

Pre-draft measurables
Height	Weight	Arm length	Hand span	Wingspan	40-yard dash	10-yard split	20-yard split	20-yard shuttle	Three-cone drill	Vertical jump	Broad jump
6 ft 2 3/8 in (1.89 m)	181 lb (82 kg)	33 1/4 in (0.84 m)	8 1/4 in (0.21 m)	6 ft 7 1/4 in (2.01 m)	4.28 s	1.51 s	2.46 s	4.39 s	7.25 s	38.5 in (0.98 m)	10 ft 11 in (3.33 m)
All values from NFL Combine/Pro Day

=== New England Patriots ===
Thornton was selected by the New England Patriots in the second round (50th overall) of the 2022 NFL draft.

On September 1, 2022, Thornton was placed on injured reserve after suffering a fractured clavicle in the preseason, and was re-activated on October 8. During Week 6 against the Cleveland Browns, Thornton scored his first receiving and rushing touchdowns, making him the first Patriots wide receiver since Deion Branch (2004) to score a receiving and rushing touchdown in the same game. Thornton finished his rookie year with 22 receptions for 247 yards and two touchdowns to go along with three carries for 16 yards and a touchdown.

On August 31, 2023, Thornton was placed on injured reserve. He was re-activated on October 14.

On November 16, 2024, the Patriots waived Thornton.

=== Kansas City Chiefs ===
On November 19, 2024, Thornton was signed to the Kansas City Chiefs' practice squad. He signed a reserve/future contract on February 11, 2025.

In the 2025 season, Thornton made his first start as a Chief in Week 2. The following week, he caught 5 passes for 71 yards, scoring a touchdown and contributing to the Chiefs’ 22–9 victory over the New York Giants. Two weeks later, Thornton achieved a new high in receiving yards, recording three receptions for 90 yards against the Jacksonville Jaguars. In 14 games (four starts), he posted 19 receptions for 438 yards and three touchdowns. On December 24, Thornton was placed on season-ending injured reserve due to a concussion.

On March 13, 2026, Thornton re-signed with the Chiefs on a two-year, $11 million contract.

On October 4, 2026, Thornton suffered a left ankle dislocation during a two-touchdown, 111-yard game against the Las Vegas Raiders. He was placed on injured reserve on October 13.
