= Denzel Mims =

American football player (born 1997)

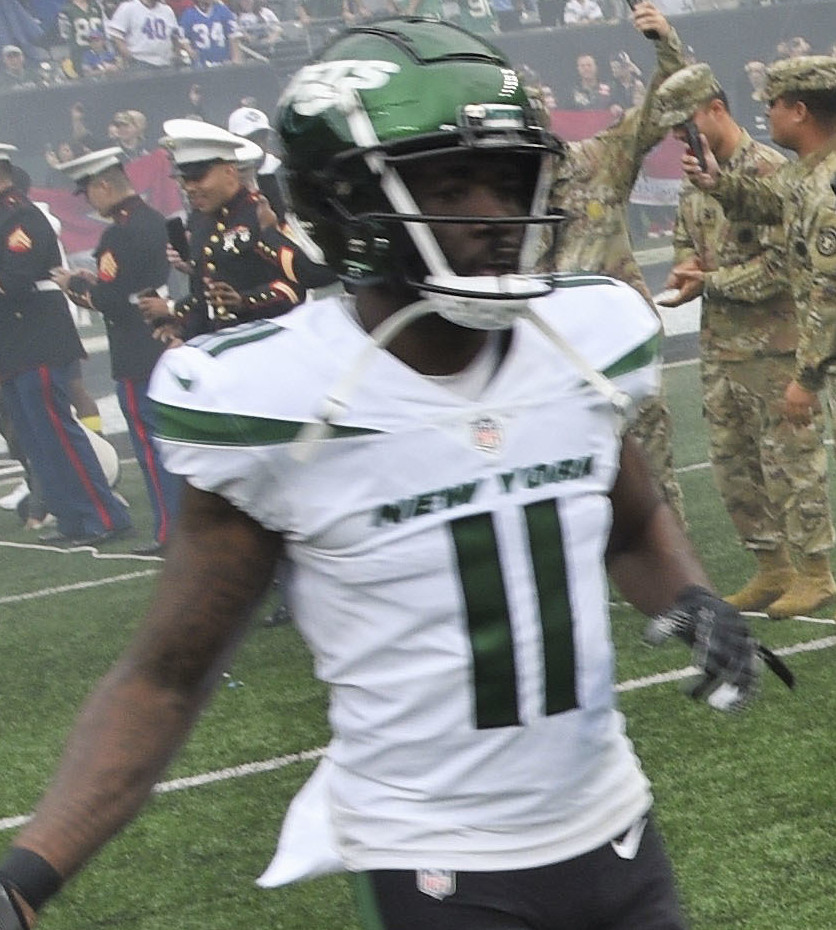
- Mims with the New York Jets in 2022

Profile
- Position: Wide receiver

Personal information
- Born: October 10, 1997 (age 29); Daingerfield, Texas, U.S.
- Listed height: 6 ft 3 in (1.91 m)
- Listed weight: 207 lb (94 kg)

Career information
- High school: Daingerfield (TX)
- College: Baylor (2016–2019)
- NFL draft: 2020: 2nd round, 59th overall pick

Career history
- New York Jets (2020–2022); Detroit Lions (2023)*; Pittsburgh Steelers (2023)*; Jacksonville Jaguars (2024)*; St. Louis Battlehawks (2025); Dallas Renegades (2026); Dallas Cowboys (2026)*
- * Offseason or practice squad member only

Awards and highlights
- First-team All-Big 12 (2019)

Career NFL statistics
- Receptions: 42
- Receiving yards: 676
- Stats at Pro Football Reference

Denzel Mims (born October 10, 1997) is an American professional football wide receiver. He played college football for the Baylor Bears and was selected by the New York Jets in the second round of the 2020 NFL draft. Mims has also played for the St. Louis Battlehawks and Dallas Renegades.

== Early life ==
Mims attended Daingerfield High School in Daingerfield, Texas. He played wide receiver and safety. He committed to Baylor University to play college football. Mims also ran track and played basketball in high school.

== College career ==
Mims played in 11 games as a true freshman at Baylor in 2016 and had four receptions for 24 yards. He became a starter his sophomore year in 2017. He started 11 of 12 games, finishing with 61 receptions for 1,087 yards and eight touchdowns. As a junior in 2018 he started 10 of 12 games, recording 55 receptions for 794 yards and eight touchdowns. Mims returned for his senior year in 2019 and started all 13 games for Baylor, recording 66 receptions for 1,020 yards and 12 touchdowns. The final game of his collegiate career was the 2020 Sugar Bowl, which featured two 11–2 teams in the Baylor Bears and the Georgia Bulldogs. In that game, Mims led the Baylor offense in receiving yards, finishing with five receptions for 75 yards, and scoring the team's lone receiving touchdown. Georgia defeated Baylor with a final score of 26–14.

== Professional career ==
Pre-draft measurables
Height	Weight	Arm length	Hand span	Wingspan	40-yard dash	10-yard split	20-yard split	20-yard shuttle	Three-cone drill	Vertical jump	Broad jump	Bench press	Wonderlic
6 ft 2 7/8 in (1.90 m)	207 lb (94 kg)	33 7/8 in (0.86 m)	9 3/8 in (0.24 m)	6 ft 6 1/2 in (1.99 m)	4.38 s	1.51 s	2.56 s	4.43 s	6.66 s	38.5 in (0.98 m)	10 ft 11 in (3.33 m)	16 reps	17
All values from NFL Combine

=== New York Jets ===
Mims was selected by the New York Jets in the second round of the 2020 NFL draft as the 59th overall pick. After missing most of training camp due to a hamstring injury, he was placed on injured reserve on September 15, 2020. He was activated on October 24 and made his NFL debut in Week 7 against the Buffalo Bills and had four receptions for 42 receiving yards. He missed the team's week 14 game due to a personal issue, and returned to the team after the game.

On August 25, 2022, Mims requested a trade from the Jets, with his agent Ron Slavin stating that the Jets were not giving Mims a legitimate opportunity to establish himself within the offense. Mims was not traded by New York, and played in 10 games (4 starts) for the team in 2022, tallying 11 catches for 186 yards and no touchdowns.

=== Detroit Lions ===
Mims and a conditional seventh-round selection in the 2025 NFL draft were traded to the Detroit Lions on July 20, 2023, in exchange for a 2025 conditional sixth-round draft selection. On August 18, Mims was waived/injured by the Lions.

=== Pittsburgh Steelers ===
On October 3, 2023, the Pittsburgh Steelers signed Mims to their practice squad. He signed a reserve/futures contract on January 17, 2024. Mims was waived by Pittsburgh on June 19.

=== Jacksonville Jaguars ===
On June 20, 2024, Mims signed with the Jacksonville Jaguars. He was released on August 25.

=== St. Louis Battlehawks ===
On October 15, 2024, Mims signed with the St. Louis Battlehawks of the United Football League (UFL). He was released on May 6, 2025.

=== Dallas Renegades ===
On January 13, 2026, Mims was selected by the Dallas Renegades in the 2026 UFL Draft.

=== Dallas Cowboys ===
On June 18, 2026, Mims signed with the Dallas Cowboys. On August 30, he was released by the Cowboys as a part of final roster cuts.
