= Trinity Christian School (Cedar Hill, Texas) =

Private Christian school in Cedar Hill, Texas, United States

Location
- 1231 East Pleasant Run Road; Cedar Hill, Texas 75104; United States; 32.604920°N 96.912952°W

Information
- Type: Private school (1981–2021); Public Charter School (2021–present)
- Motto: 'Providing a Complete Educational Environment in a Spiritual Atmosphere...'
- Established: 1981
- Head teacher: Pastor Jim Henesy
- Colors: Blue, Black, and White
- Mascot: Tiger
- Website: Official Website

Trinity Christian School is a public, charter, Christian school founded in 1981. The campus is located at Trinity Church in Cedar Hill, Texas and is affiliated with Trinity Ministries.

Trinity School educates students from pre-school and K5 – 12th grade students, and is considered a College Preparatory School.

Locally the school is referred to as Trinity Christian School-Cedar Hill (or TCS) to distinguish it from Trinity Christian-Addison.

== History ==
Founded in 1981, Trinity Christian School is one of the oldest and largest Christian schools in southern Dallas County. TCS was founded by the Trinity Church Board of Trustees. The school is a non-profit organization governed by a board of trustees from Trinity Church of the Assemblies of God. In 2021, the school became part of Trinity Leadership Public Schools, a network of public charter schools located in San Angelo, Abilene, Midland, Arlington and Cedar Hill. A Christian preschool, Trinity Christian Preschool, also operates at the site under the church's leadership, serving children ranging from six months of age up to kindergarten.

== Student life ==
AP and Honors classes include English, Science, Math, and History. Clubs and groups for students include an elected Student Council, Yearbook, Worship Band, Jazz Band, Handbells, a student-run newspaper, chapel, prayer groups, National Honor Society, chess club, and machine club.

== Sports ==
Varsity athletics events in which the school participates include US Basketball, US Coed Soccer, US Football, US Baseball, Track and Field, Tennis, Golf, Cheerleading, Volleyball, and Softball.

Trinity has teams of soccer, basketball, baseball, football, track and field, volleyball, golf, tennis, cheerleading, softball, wrestling, and competitive weightlifting. Trinity competes in the TAPPS (TAPPS) and has won numerous honors, including:

- Varsity boys football: State Champion (1991, 1993, 1994, 2014, 2017, 2018, 2019, 2020), State finalist (2005, 2006, 2008, 2015) Known as the Back to Back State Champs
- Varsity boys basketball: State Champion (2008, 2015, 2016), State Finalist (2007) 2018 State Runner Up
- Varsity girls basketball: State Champion (2019)
- Varsity boys track & field: State Champion (2006, 2016, 2017, 2018), State runner-up (2007)
- Varsity girls track & field: State runner-up (2017)
- Varsity boys golf: Two State Finalists in 2006 (Chandler Gadis)(Nick Storbachen)

== Memberships ==
Formerly member of TAPPS - Texas Association of Private & Parochial Schools. December 2019, membership terminated from TAPPS after handful of alleged violations, including use of controlled substance after football state championship.

== Academics ==
Trinity's academic program gives detailed courses on the Bible (Old Testament and New Testament).

== Traditions ==
Traditions include an annual homecoming game in which each class's float has a parade and other fun activities, "Senior Night", school-wide retreats, a senior missions trip to a foreign country, a "spiritual emphasis" week where there is a week of encounter with God, and after spiritual emphasis there are plunge parties where the students who had an encounter with God are baptized.

== Notable alumni ==
- Lewis Cine (2019), safety for the Minnesota Vikings, played college football for the Georgia Bulldogs
- Qualan Jones (2019), running back for the Toronto Argonauts, played college football for the Baylor Bears and the Stephen F. Austin Lumberjacks
- Shilo Sanders (2019), former safety for the Tampa Bay Buccaneers, played college football for the Colorado Buffaloes
- Shedeur Sanders (2021), quarterback for the Cleveland Browns, played college football for the Colorado Buffaloes
- Cam'Ron Silmon-Craig (2021), safety for the Jacksonville Jaguars, played college football for the Colorado Buffaloes
- Champ Anthony (2022), played college football for the Auburn Tigers
