= 2019 SEC Championship Game =

- Conference Championship
Georgia Bulldogs	LSU Tigers
(11–1)	(12–0)
10	37
Head coach: Kirby Smart	Head coach: Ed Orgeron
AP / Coaches / CFP; 4 / 4 / 4	AP / Coaches / CFP; 1 / 1 / 2
	1	2	3	4	Total
Georgia	0	3	0	7	10
LSU	14	3	17	3	37
- Date: December 7, 2019
- Season: 2019
- Stadium: Mercedes-Benz Stadium
- Location: Atlanta, Georgia
- MVP: Joe Burrow (QB, LSU)
- Favorite: LSU by 7
- Referee: James Carter
- Attendance: 74,150

United States TV coverage
- Network: CBS
- Announcers: Brad Nessler (play-by-play), Gary Danielson (color commentator), Jamie Erdahl (sideline reporter) & Gene Steratore (rules analyst) (CBS); Ryan Radtke, Derek Rackley and Olivia Harlan (Westwood One); Dave Neal, David Archer and Stephen Hartzell (SEC Radio)

2019 Southeastern Conference football standings
	Conf.			Overall
Team	W		L	W		L
Eastern Division
No. 4 Georgia x	7	–	1	12	–	2
No. 6 Florida	6	–	2	11	–	2
Tennessee *	5	–	3	8	–	5
Kentucky	3	–	5	8	–	5
Missouri *	3	–	5	6	–	6
South Carolina	3	–	5	4	–	8
Vanderbilt	1	–	7	3	–	9
Western Division
No. 1 LSU x$#^	8	–	0	15	–	0
No. 8 Alabama	6	–	2	11	–	2
No. 14 Auburn	5	–	3	9	–	4
Texas A&M	4	–	4	8	–	5
Mississippi State	3	–	5	6	–	7
Ole Miss	2	–	6	4	–	8
Arkansas	0	–	8	2	–	10
Championship: LSU 37, Georgia 10
# – College Football Playoff champion; ^ – College Football Playoff participant; $ – Conference champion; x – Division champion/co-champions; * – Tennessee vacated all wins due to NCAA violations. Missouri was ineligible for postseason due to NCAA sanctions.; Rankings from AP Poll

The 2019 SEC Championship Game was a college football game played on Saturday, December 7, 2019, at Mercedes-Benz Stadium in Atlanta. The game determined the 2019 champion of the Southeastern Conference (SEC). The game featured the East division champions the University of Georgia Bulldogs (Georgia) and the West division champions the Louisiana State University Tigers (LSU). Beginning in 1992, this served as the conference's 28th annual championship game. After a dominating performance by transfer quarterback Joe Burrow, LSU became the 2019 SEC champions winning the game by a final score of 37–10. The strong performance not only earned LSU the 2019 SEC Championship trophy but it contributed to earning the No.1 seed in the 2019 College Football Playoffs. After their loss, Georgia moved to the fifth spot in the rankings and earned a bid to play in their second consecutive Allstate Sugar Bowl.

== Pre-game buildup ==
Coming into the conference championship game, LSU's Joe Burrow was considered the front-runner for the Heisman Trophy with 4,366 passing yards and 44 passing touchdowns. While Georgia's offense was led by another strong-performing quarterback Jake Fromm, it was Georgia's strong defense that gave them a chance in the game. With both teams ranked in the top 4, aside from the SEC champion title, the game was played for a spot in the playoffs.

Additionally, this same match-up in the SEC championship game has occurred 3 times before, once in 2003 where LSU came on top (34–13). In 2005, Georgia's only win of the 3 (34–14) and then once again in 2011 where LSU once again came out on top (42–10).

=== Matchups ===
==== LSU ====
LSU finished their 2018 season with a Fiesta Bowl win over #8 UCF, marking their first New Year's Six bowl appearance since the creation of the College Football Playoff (CFP). In 2019, LSU earned their spot in the SEC Championship Game by winning all twelve games of the regular season, beating nationally ranked opponents such as #7 Florida, #9 Auburn and former #3 Alabama. Averaging 560.4 total offensive yards and 48.7 points per game leading up to the SEC Championship Game, LSU's offense was labeled by many outlets as the country's top offense. Helping Joe Burrow on the offense was junior running back Clyde Edwards-Helaire, who scored 16 touchdowns and ran for 1,233 yards during the regular season. On the receiving end, Burrow's top receivers were sophomore Ja'Marr Chase, who led the nation in yards with 1,780, and junior Justin Jefferson, who tied for number one in receptions with 111.

==== Georgia ====
The #4 Georgia Bulldogs ended the previous season with a loss the 2018 SEC Championship Game to the #1 Alabama Crimson Tide led by backup quarterback Jalen Hurts, making it Georgia's second consecutive post-season loss to a 2nd-string Alabama quarterback. In 2019, Georgia earned a bid to play in the SEC Championship Game after starting with a five-game winning streak, including a victory over #7 Notre Dame. Their only loss in the regular season came in double-overtime to SEC East opponent South Carolina. Throughout the regular season, Georgia's offense averaged 32.9 points and 420.6 yards per game. Georgia was strongest on defense, leading the SEC in scoring, run, and total defense, allowing only 257 yards on average. ^^

== Game summary ==
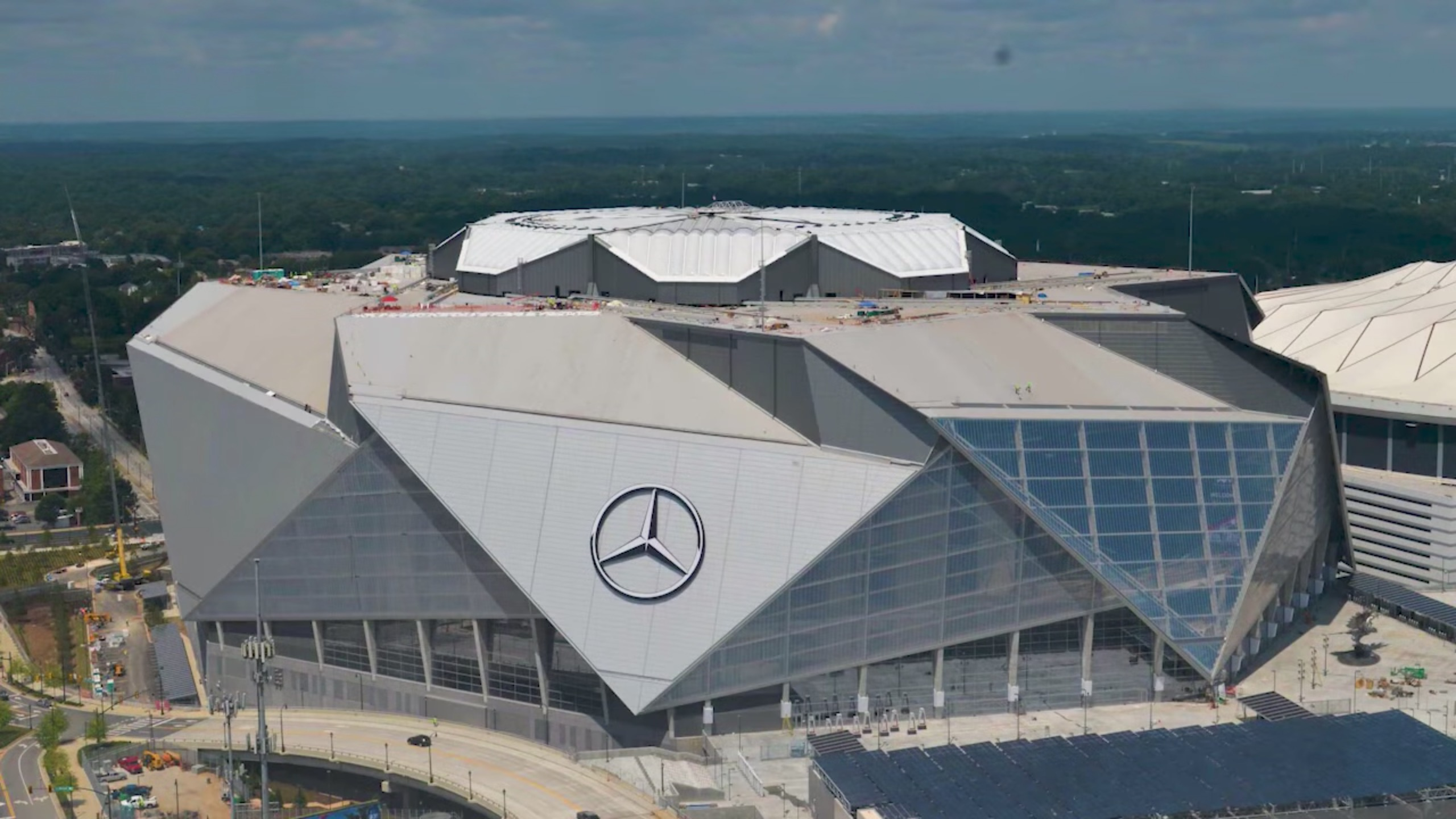
Mercedes-Benz Stadium in Atlanta, Georgia.

The 28th edition of the SEC Championship Game kicked off 4:00pm ET on December 7, 2019. Televised on CBS in the United States, the game earned a Nielsen rating of 7.9. Brad Nessler, Gary Danielson, Jamie Erdahl, and Gene Steratore were the crew of broadcaster's for the game. The game was played indoors at Mercedes Benz Stadium in Atlanta, Georgia. The game was dominated by LSU's offense and a defense that kept Georgia to three points until the fourth quarter. To start the game, Joe Burrow threw for two touchdowns in the first quarter and both teams settled for a field goal each in the second. The second half showcased two more touchdown passes from Burrow and one touchdown for Georgia in the fourth quarter.

=== First quarter ===
Georgia received the opening kick-off from Avery Atkins, but punted on their opening possession after only gaining one first down. On LSU's first possession, the Tigers marched 75 yards down the field and opened the scoring with a 23-yard touchdown pass from Joe Burrow to Ja'Marr Chase. After both teams punted on their next drive, Georgia had an opportunity to score late in the first quarter, but Rodrigo Blankenship's 52-yard field goal attempt was no good. On the next drive, LSU scored again, this time on a pass from Burrow to Terrance Marshall Jr.

=== Second quarter ===
Early in the second quarter, Georgia got on the board with a 39-yard field goal by Blankenship. LSU's Cade York converted a 41-yard field goal and also missed a 48-yard attempt in the final minute of the half to make the score 17–3 at half-time.

=== Third quarter ===
On the opening drive of the second half, LSU scored again via a 28-yard field goal by Cade York. After another unsuccessful field goal attempt by the Bulldogs, LSU scored a touchdown on the next possession via a four-yard pass from Burrow to Marshall Jr. Georgia quarterback Jake Fromm was intercepted by LSU's Derek Stingley Jr. on the first play of their next possession, after which the Tigers scored via an eight-yard pass from Burrow to Justin Jefferson to make the score 34–3 at the end of the third quarter.

=== Fourth quarter ===
In the fourth quarter, Georgia scored their only touchdown on the day via a two-yard pass from Fromm to George Pickens, and LSU added a 50-yard field goal by York to make the final score 37–10.

Statistics	UGA	LSU
First downs	20	26
Plays–yards	68–286	74–481
Rushes–yards	25–61	36–132
Passing yards	225	349
Passing: comp–att–int	20–43–2	28–38–0
Time of possession	26:22	33:38

Team	Category	Player	Statistics
Georgia	Passing	Jake Fromm	20/42, 225 yards, 1 TD, 2 INT
Georgia	Rushing	Brian Herrien	8 carries, 24 yards
Georgia	Receiving	George Pickens	4 receptions, 54 yards, 1 TD
LSU	Passing	Joe Burrow	28/38, 349 yards, 4 TD
LSU	Rushing	Clyde Edwards-Helaire	15 carries, 57 yards
LSU	Receiving	Justin Jefferson	7 receptions, 115 yards, 1 TD

2019 SEC Championship Game

Quarter	1	2	3	4	Total
No. 4 Georgia	0	3	0	7	10
No. 2 LSU	14	3	17	3	37

at Mercedes-Benz Stadium • Atlanta, Georgia

- Date: Saturday, December 7, 2019
- Game time: 4:00 p.m. EST
- Game attendance: 74,150
- Referee: James Carter
- TV announcers (CBS): Brad Nessler (play-by-play), Gary Danielson (color), Jamie Erdahl (sideline)
- ESPN game summary

Game information

First Quarter

- (9:09) LSU – Joe Burrow 23 yard pass to Ja'Marr Chase, Cade York kick (Drive: 8 plays, 75 yards, 3:38; LSU 7–0)
- (0:12) LSU – Joe Burrow 7 yard pass to Jay Ward, Cade York kick (Drive: 5 plays, 65 yards, 1:44; LSU 14–0)

Second Quarter

- (11:28) UGA – Rodrigo Blankenship 39 yard field goal (Drive: 10 plays, 53 yards, 3:44; LSU 14–3)
- (2:22) LSU – Cade York 41 yard field goal (Drive: 11 plays, 57 yards, 4:22; LSU 17–3)

Third Quarter

- (8:20) LSU – Cade York 27 yard field goal (Drive: 16 plays, 65 yards, 6:40; LSU 20–3)
- (2:18) LSU – Joe Burrow 4 yard pass to Terrace Marshall, Cade York kick (Drive: 4 plays, 80 yards, 1:59; LSU 27–3)
- (0:45) LSU – Joe Burrow 8 yard pass to Justin Jefferson, Cade York kick (Drive: 3 plays, 13 yards, 1:25; LSU 34–3)

Fourth Quarter

- (11:41) UGA – Jake Fromm 2 yard pass to George Pickens, Rodrigo Blankenship kick (Drive: 13 plays, 75 yards, 4:04; LSU 34–10)
- (7:41) LSU – Cade York 50 yard field goal (Drive: 7 plays, 33 yards, 4:00; LSU 37–10)

== Post-game significance ==
=== Joe Burrow ===
LSU quarterback Joe Burrow threw for 349 yards and four touchdowns, and was named game MVP. After a season of strong performances, Joe Burrow won the 2019 Heisman Trophy over Oklahoma's Jalen Hurts and Ohio State's Justin Fields. Burrow finished the season with 76.3 completion percentage, 5,671 yards, 60 touchdowns and only 6 interceptions.

=== Bowl games ===
LSU, ranked second in the College Football Playoff rankings before the game, moved up to first in the rankings after the win and secured their place in the national semifinal game against University of Oklahoma in the Peach Bowl also played at Mercedes Benz Stadium. The Georgia football team, ranked fourth prior to the game, moved down to fifth and received a bid to the Sugar Bowl against Baylor. Both teams went on to win their individual bowl games and LSU moved onto the National Championship Game to play Clemson.

=== National championship ===
After winning both the SEC conference championship and CFP semifinals, LSU earned a spot in the CFP championship game against the No. 3 Clemson Tigers. The Clemson football team won its way to the national championship after defeating Ohio State in the PlayStation Fiesta Bowl. The national championship game was played in New Orleans' Mercedes Benz Superdome on January 13, 2020. LSU came out on top with a score of 42–25 with another strong performance by Joe Burrow with 5 touchdowns and 463 yards to complete LSU's undefeated perfect season.
