= Bravvion Roy =

American football player (born 1996)

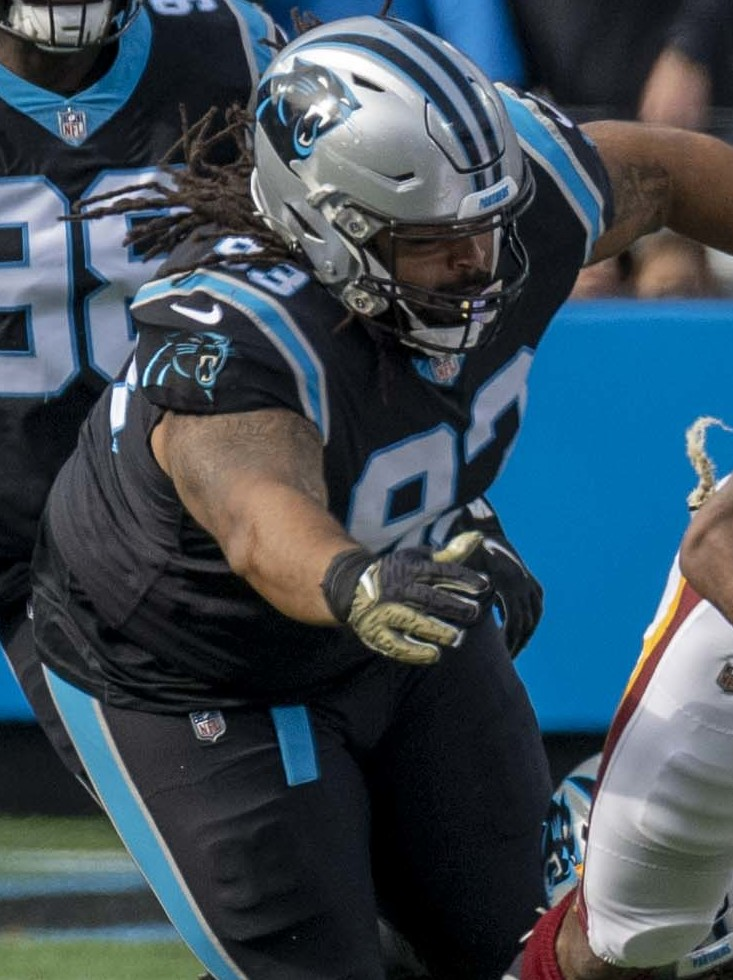
- Roy with the Carolina Panthers in 2021

Profile
- Position: Nose tackle

Personal information
- Born: October 18, 1996 (age 30); Houston, Texas, U.S.
- Listed height: 6 ft 1 in (1.85 m)
- Listed weight: 330 lb (150 kg)

Career information
- High school: Spring (Spring, Texas)
- College: Baylor (2016–2019)
- NFL draft: 2020: 6th round, 184th overall pick

Career history
- Carolina Panthers (2020–2022); Chicago Bears (2023)*; Baltimore Ravens (2023)*
- * Offseason or practice squad member only

Career NFL statistics as of 2023
- Total tackles: 76
- Sacks: 1
- Pass deflections: 5
- Interceptions: 1
- Stats at Pro Football Reference

Bravvion Roy (born October 18, 1996) is an American professional football nose tackle. He played college football for the Baylor Bears, and was selected by the Carolina Panthers in the sixth round of the 2020 NFL draft.

== College career ==
As a senior at Baylor, Roy made 61 tackles including 13 tackles-for-loss, 5.5 sacks, one forced fumble, seven quarterback hurries, and one blocked kick. He was named to the first-team All-Big 12 Conference. Against Kansas State, Roy tallied a career-high 3.5 tackles-for-loss and a half sack. In his career, he compiled 133 career tackles, 7.5 sacks, and 19 tackles for loss.

== Professional career ==
Pre-draft measurables
Height	Weight	Arm length	Hand span
6 ft 1 1/8 in (1.86 m)	332 lb (151 kg)	30 1/8 in (0.77 m)	9 in (0.23 m)
All values from the Baylor Pro Day

=== Carolina Panthers ===
Roy was selected by the Carolina Panthers with the 184th overall pick in the sixth round of the 2020 NFL draft. Roy was reunited with Carolina Panthers' head coach Matt Rhule, who was also his head coach at Baylor.

In Week 12 against the Minnesota Vikings, Roy recorded his first career sack on Kirk Cousins during the 28–27 loss.

On September 20, 2022, Roy was placed on injured reserve after suffering a hamstring injury in Week 2. He was activated on October 22.

On November 20, 2022, Roy recorded his first career interception against Lamar Jackson and the Baltimore Ravens.

On July 31, 2023, Roy was waived by the Panthers.

=== Chicago Bears ===
On August 1, 2023, the Chicago Bears claimed Roy off waivers. He was waived on August 29, 2023.

=== Baltimore Ravens ===
On August 31, 2023, the Ravens signed Roy to their practice squad. He signed a reserve/future contract on January 29, 2024. However, on May 22, Roy was released by Baltimore.
