= 2024 Oklahoma State Cowboys football team =

American college football season

2024 Oklahoma State Cowboys football
- Conference: Big 12 Conference
- Record: 3–9 (0–9 Big 12)
- Head coach: Mike Gundy (20th season)
- Offensive coordinator: Kasey Dunn (5th season)
- Offensive scheme: Spread option
- Defensive coordinator: Bryan Nardo (2nd season)
- Co-defensive coordinator: Joe Bob Clements (2nd season)
- Base defense: 3–3–5
- Home stadium: Boone Pickens Stadium

2024 Big 12 Conference football standings
	Conf.			Overall
Team	W		L	W		L
No. 7 Arizona State y$^	7	–	2	11	–	3
No. 15 Iowa State y	7	–	2	11	–	3
No. 13 BYU	7	–	2	11	–	2
No. 25 Colorado	7	–	2	9	–	4
Baylor	6	–	3	8	–	5
TCU	6	–	3	9	–	4
Texas Tech	6	–	3	8	–	5
Kansas State	5	–	4	9	–	4
West Virginia	5	–	4	6	–	7
Kansas	4	–	5	5	–	7
Cincinnati	3	–	6	5	–	7
Houston	3	–	6	4	–	8
Utah	2	–	7	5	–	7
UCF	2	–	7	4	–	8
Arizona	2	–	7	4	–	8
Oklahoma State	0	–	9	3	–	9
Championship: Arizona State 45, Iowa State 19
^ – College Football Playoff participant; $ – Conference champion; y – Championship game participant; Rankings from AP Poll

The 2024 Oklahoma State Cowboys football team represented Oklahoma State University as a member of the Big 12 Conference during the 2024 NCAA Division I FBS football season. They were led by Mike Gundy in his 20th year as their head coach. The Cowboys played home games at Boone Pickens Stadium located in Stillwater, Oklahoma.

Following a Big XII Championship game appearance in the previous year, the Cowboys had high pre-season expectations with Heisman candidate Ollie Gordon II. After a 3–0 start, the Cowboys rose to #13 in the AP poll, but dropped out of the rankings after consecutive losses. After a loss to TCU on November 9, the Cowboys clinched their first losing season since 2005, ending an eighteen-season-long bowl streak. The Cowboys lost their final 9 games, going winless in conference play. This was the Cowboys worst season since 1991, when they went winless. No players were selected for the all-conference Big 12 teams, the only school to have that dubious honor.

On December 4, offensive coordinator Kasey Dunn and defensive coordinator Bryan Nardo were fired.

== Preseason ==
=== Big 12 media poll ===
The preseason poll was released on July 2, 2024.

Big 12
Predicted finish	Team	Votes (1st place)
1	Utah	906 (20)
2	Kansas State	889 (19)
3	Oklahoma State	829 (14)
4	Kansas	772 (5)
5	Arizona	762 (3)
6	Iowa State	661
7	West Virginia	581
8	UCF	551
9	Texas Tech	532
10	TCU	436
11	Colorado	400
12	Baylor	268
13	BYU	215
14	Cincinnati	196
15	Houston	157
16	Arizona State	141

- First place votes in ()

== Schedule ==
Date	Time	Opponent	Rank	Site	TV	Result	Attendance
August 31	1:00 p.m.	No. 1 (FCS) South Dakota State*	No. 17	Boone Pickens Stadium; Stillwater, OK	ESPN+	W 44–20	52,202
September 7	11:00 a.m.	Arkansas*	No. 16	Boone Pickens Stadium; Stillwater, OK	ABC	W 39–31 ^{2OT}	52,202
September 14	11:00 a.m.	at Tulsa*	No. 13	Skelly Field at H. A. Chapman Stadium; Tulsa, OK (rivalry)	ESPN2	W 45–10	30,915
September 21	3:00 p.m.	No. 12 Utah	No. 14	Boone Pickens Stadium; Stillwater, OK	FOX	L 19–22	52,202
September 28	11:00 a.m.	at No. 23 Kansas State	No. 20	Bill Snyder Family Stadium; Manhattan, KS	ESPN	L 20–42	51,741
October 5	3:00 p.m.	West Virginia		Boone Pickens Stadium; Stillwater, OK	ESPN2	L 14–38	52,202
October 18	9:15 p.m.	at No. 13 BYU		LaVell Edwards Stadium; Provo, UT	ESPN	L 35–38	62,841
October 26	2:30 p.m.	at Baylor		McLane Stadium; Waco, TX	ESPN+	L 28–38	44,987
November 2	2:30 p.m.	Arizona State^{†}		Boone Pickens Stadium; Stillwater, OK	FOX/FS2	L 21–42	52,202
November 9	6:00 p.m.	at TCU		Amon G. Carter Stadium; Fort Worth, TX	FS1	L 13–38	45,348
November 23	2:30 p.m.	Texas Tech		Boone Pickens Stadium; Stillwater, OK	ESPN+	L 48–56	52,202
November 29	11:00 a.m.	at No. 25 Colorado		Folsom Field; Boulder, CO	ABC	L 0–52	51,030
*Non-conference game; ^{†}Homecoming; Rankings from AP Poll (and CFP rankings, after October 30) - Released prior to game; All times are in Central time

== Personnel ==
2024 Oklahoma State Cowboys football team roster
Players
Coaches
Offense

Pos.	#	Name	Class
RB	0	Ollie Gordon II	Jr
WR	1	De'Zhaun Stribling	Jr
WR	2	Talyn Shettron	So
RB	3	Sesi Vailahi	Fr
RB	4	AJ Green	Sr
WR	5	Da'Wain Lofton	Sr
QB	6	Zane Flores	Fr
QB	7	Alan Bowman	Sr
QB	8	Maealiuaki Smith	Fr
WR	9	Ayo Shotomide-King	So
WR	10	Rashod Owens	Sr
TE	11	Tabry Shettron	So
WR	12	Kyler Pearson	Sr
QB	13	Garret Rangel	So
QB	15	Garret Wilson	Fr
WR	16	Tre' Griffiths	Fr
WR	17	Gavin Freeman	Jr
RB	20	Rodney Fields Jr.	Fr
RB	22	C.J. Williams	Fr
WR	23	Jalen Pope	Fr
RB	24	Trent Howland	Jr
RB	28	Jaden Allen-Hendrix	Fr
WR	31	Jaxon Deason	So
WR	32	Braden Baize	Fr
RB	35	Holden Thompson	Fr
WR	36	Ty Walls	Fr
RB	37	Seth Swircyznski	So
FB	38	Jake Schultz	Sr
TE	40	Josh Ford	Fr
TE	42	Dominic Grein	Fr
FB	47	Luke McEndoo	Jr
FB	48	Bryce Drummond	Jr
OL	50	Wiley Sills	Fr
OL	51	Austin Kawecki	So
OL	56	Aiden Isaacs	Fr
OL	58	Ashton Isaacs	Fr
OL	59	Wyatt Holmes	Fr
OL	60	Chauncey Johnson	Fr
OL	61	Jake Springfield	Sr
OL	62	Jamison Mejia	Fr
OL	63	Caleb Hackleman	Fr
OL	64	Jarrett Henry	So
OL	65	Hilton Marsh	Jr
OL	66	Joe Michalski	Sr
OL	67	Cole Birmingham	Sr
OL	68	Taylor Miterko	Sr
OL	69	Nuku Mafi	Fr
OL	70	Jack Endean	Fr
OL	71	Dalton Cooper	Sr
OL	72	Isaia Glass	Jr
OL	74	Preston Wilson	Sr
OL	75	Jakobe Sanders	Fr
OL	76	Calvin Harvey	So
OL	77	Noah McKinney	So
OL	78	Davis Dotson	So
OL	79	Gage Stanaland	Fr
WR	80	Brennan Presley	Sr
TE	81	Joe Bisso	Fr
WR	81	Camron Heard	Fr
TE	82	Quinton Stewart	Sr
WR	83	Cale Cabbiness	Sr
WR	84	Mason Gilkey	So
WR	85	Tykie Andrews	Fr
TE	86	Tyler Foster	Sr
WR	87	Cutter Greene	Fr
WR	88	Heston Thompson	Fr
WR	89	Marcus Dockins Jr.	So

Defense

Pos.	#	Name	Class
S	0	Kobe Hylton	Sr
CB	2	Korie Black	Sr
CB	3	Cam Smith	Jr
LB	4	Nickolas Martin	Jr
S	5	Kendal Daniels	Jr
S	6	Lyrik Rawls	Jr
S	7	Cameron Epps	So
S	8	Parker Robertson	Jr
S	9	Trey Rucker	Sr
CB	10	Kale Smith	Jr
S	11	Dylan Smith	So
S	12	Kam Franklin	Fr
CB	13	RJ Lester	Fr
S	14	Landyn Cleveland	Fr
S	15	Ty Williams	Jr
S	17	Tywon Jr. Wray	Fr
S	18	David Kabongo	Fr
S	19	Gabriel Rodriguez	Fr
CB	20	DeSean Buckner	Sr
LB	22	Jeff Roberson	Sr
CB	23	Kenneth Harris	Sr
CB	24	De'Kelvion Beamon	Jr
LB	25	Ike Esonwune	Fr
CB	26	Jacobi Jr. Oliphant	Fr
CB	27	Raymond II Gay	Jr
CB	28	LaDainian Fields	Fr
S	29	Cooper Lai	Fr
LB	30	Collin Oliver	Sr
LB	31	Chance Clements	So
LB	32	Gabe Brown	So
DE	33	Obi Ezeigbo	Sr
LB	35	Poasa Utu	Fr
S	36	Talon Kendrick	Fr
S	37	Garrick Martin	Sr
S	38	Kade Welcher	Jr
S	39	Christian Hurd	Fr
CB	40	Bismillah Muhammad	Fr
LB	41	Jonathan Agumadu	Fr
LB	42	Grant Mirabal	Fr
LB	44	Justin Wright	Sr
LB	45	Justin Crutchmer	Fr
LB	46	Temerrick Johnson	Fr
DE	47	Patrick Ojo	So
LB	48	Chris Robinson	So
S	49	Reed DeQuasie	Fr
CB	49	Evan Smith	So
LB	50	Gunnar Wilson	Fr
LB	51	Charles III Christopher	Fr
LB	52	Yamil Talib	Fr
LB	53	Andrew McCall	Fr
DE	54	Austin Young	Fr
DE	56	Xavier Ross	Sr
NT	67	Jaelen Tucker	So
NT	71	Aden Kelley	Jr
DE	87	DeSean Brown	So
DE	88	Landon Dean	So
NT	90	A. J. Ridener	So
NT	93	Collin Clay	Sr
DE	94	Armstrong Nnodim	Fr
DE	95	Jaleel Johnson	So
DE	96	Koby Walterscheid	Sr
NT	97	Justin Kirkland	Jr
NT	98	Luke Webb	Fr
NT	99	Iman Oates	Jr

Special teams

Pos.	#	Name	Class
K	19	Logan Ward	Jr
P	29	Hudson Kaak	So
K	39	Drake Tabor	Jr
LS	44	Shea Freibaum	So
LS	57	Aidan Davenport	Sr
K	59	Kason Shrum	Sr
K	79	David Arriaga	Fr
P	90	Wes Pahl	Sr

Head coach

- Mike Gundy

Coordinators/assistant coaches

- Joe Bob Clements – Co-defensive coordinator/linebackers
- Charlie Dickey – Offensive line
- Tim Duffie – Defensive passing game coordinator/cornerbacks
- Kasey Dunn – Associate head coach/offensive coordinator/wide receivers
- Dan Hammerschmidt – Safeties
- Jason McEndoo – Tight ends/Cowboy Backs
- Bryan Nardo – Defensive coordinator
- Paul Randolph – Defensive line
- Tim Rattay – Quarterbacks
- Sean Snyder – Punters and kickers
- John Wozniak – Running backs
- Rob Glass – Strength and conditioning
- Greg Brown – Defensive analyst
- Stan Eggen – Defensive analyst
- Gary Gibbs – Defensive analyst
- Bradley Thomas – Offensive analyst
- Tim Sanders – Offensive analyst
- Chris Thurmond – Offensive analyst
- Joseph Foteh – Special teams analyst
- Travis Britz – Graduate assistant – DL
- Byron Robinson Jr. – Graduate assistant – DB
- Jordan Johnson – Graduate assistant – OL
- Tracin Wallace – Graduate assistant – WR
- David Glidden – Offensive quality control
- J. W. Walsh – Offensive quality control
- Rod Johnson – Director, football operations
- Jon Pickle – Assistant director of football operations
- Todd Bradford – Director, football recruiting
- Casey Friesen – Manager, on-campus recruiting
- Josh Gonzales – Assistant recruiting director, offense/prospect analyst – WR
- Richetti Jones – Director, player development
- Beni Tonga – Player development specialist/prospect analyst – TE/FB
- Eddie Simpkins – Administrative assistant/prospect analyst – QB
- Zach Allen – Prospect analyst – OL
- Justin Gordon – Prospect analyst – LB
- Deonte Cruse – Prospect analyst – RB
- D. J. Linton – Prospect analyst – DL
- Cameron O'Neal – Prospect analyst – DB

Legend

- (C) Team captain
- (S) Suspended
- (I) Ineligible
- Injured
- Redshirt

Roster

== Game summaries ==
=== vs No. 1 (FCS) South Dakota State ===
No. 1 (FCS) South Dakota State Jackrabbits (0–0) vs No. 17 Oklahoma State Cowboys (0–0) – Game summary

Quarter	1	2	3	4	Total
No. 1 (FCS) Jackrabbits	0	6	7	7	20
No. 17 Cowboys	10	7	21	6	44

at Boone Pickens Stadium • Stillwater, OK

- Date: August 31, 2024
- Game time: 1:00 p.m.
- Game weather: 83 °F (28 °C)
- Game attendance: 52,202
- Referee: Kevin Boitmann
- TV announcers (ESPN+): Shawn Kenney (play-by-play), Taylor McHargue (analyst), and Tori Petry (sideline)

Game information

First quarter

- (8:15) OSU – Logan Ward 42-yard field goal (Drive: 11 plays, 32 yards, 3:12; OSU 3–0)
- (2:03) OSU – Brennan Presley 6-yard pass from Alan Bowman, Logan Ward kick (Drive: 7 plays, 47 yards, 2:36; OSU 10–0)

Second quarter

- (12:15) SDS – Hunter Dustman 31-yard field goal (Drive: 8 plays, 58 yards, 4:40; OSU 10–3)
- (8:35) OSU – Ollie Gordon II 12-yard rush, Logan Ward kick (Drive: 10 plays, 74 yards, 3:34; OSU 17–3)
- (3:52) SDS – Hunter Dustman 48-yard field goal (Drive: 8 plays, 45 yards, 4:43; OSU 17–6)

Third quarter

- (10:46) OSU – Ollie Gordon II 22-yard rush, Logan Ward kick (Drive: 10 plays, 65 yards, 4:14; OSU 24–6)
- (9:10) OSU – Graham Goering 21-yard pass from Mark Gronowski, Hunter Dustman kick (Drive: 3 plays, 75 yards, 1:36; OSU 24–13)
- (6:29) OSU – Rashod Owens 58-yard pass from Alan Bowman, Logan Ward kick (Drive: 6 plays, 81 yards, 2:33; OSU 31–13)
- (2:29) OSU – Ollie Gordon II 1-yard rush, Logan Ward kick (Drive: 7 plays, 56 yards, 3:11; OSU 38–13)

Fourth quarter

- (13:50) OSU – Logan Ward 52-yard field goal (Drive: 4 plays, 5 yards, 1:01; OSU 41–13)
- (12:10) SDS – Griffin Wilde 60-yard pass from Mark Gronowski, Hunter Dustman kick (Drive: 3 plays, 78 yards, 1:37; OSU 41–20)
- (1:10) OSU – Logan Ward 25-yard field goal (Drive: 4 plays, 7 yards, 1:56; OSU 44–20)

Statistics	SDST	OKST
First downs	17	23
Total yards	388	394
Rushing yards	124	149
Passing yards	264	245
Passing: Comp–Att–Int	20-27-1	25-34-0
Time of possession	30:47	29:13

Team	Category	Player	Statistics
South Dakota State	Passing	Mark Gronowski	20/37, 264 yards, 2 TD, 1 INT
South Dakota State	Rushing	Amar Johnson	9 carries, 73 yards, 0 TD
South Dakota State	Receiving	Griffin Wilde	7 receptions, 150 yards, 1 TD
Oklahoma State	Passing	Alan Bowman	24/33, 245 yards, 2 TD, 0 INT
Oklahoma State	Rushing	Ollie Gordon II	28 carries, 126 yards, 3 TD
Oklahoma State	Receiving	De'Zhaun Stribling	6 receptions, 83 yards, 0 TD

=== vs. Arkansas ===
Game Two – Arkansas Razorbacks (1–0) at No. 16 Oklahoma State Cowboys (1–0) – Game summary

Quarter	1	2	3	4	OT	2OT	Total
Razorbacks	14	7	0	10	0	0	31
No. 16 Cowboys	0	7	6	18	0	8	39

at Boone Pickens Stadium • Stillwater, Oklahoma

- Date: Saturday, September 7, 2024
- Game time: 11:00 a.m. CST
- Game weather: Sunny • Temperature: 69 °F (21 °C) • Wind: NE at 10 mph (16 km/h)
- Game attendance: 52,202
- Referee: Matt Loeffler
- TV announcers (ABC): Dave Pasch (play-by-play), Dusty Dvoracek (analyst), and Taylor McGregor (sideline)

Game information

First quarter

- (5:52) ARK – Ja'Quinden Jackson 5-yard run, Kyle Ramsey kick (Drive: 6 plays, 45 yards, 2:45; ARK 7–0)
- (1:31) ARK – Ja'Quinden Jackson 5-yard run, Kyle Ramsey kick (Drive: 8 plays, 83 yards, 3:12; ARK 14–0)

Second quarter

- (8:50) OSU – Kale Smith 73-yard interception, Logan Ward kick (ARK 14–7)
- (5:05) ARK – Ja'Quinden Jackson 11-yard run, Kyle Ramsey kick (Drive: 7 plays, 75 yards, 3:45; ARK 21–7)

Third quarter

- (6:45) OSU – Logan Ward 45-yard field goal (Drive: 15 plays, 62 yards, 5:05; ARK 21–10)
- (0:39) OSU – Logan Ward 35-yard field goal (Drive: 8 plays, 31 yards, 2:46; ARK 21–13)

Fourth quarter

- (9:37) OSU – Brennan Presley 7-yard pass from Alan Bowman, De'Zhaun Stribling pass (Drive: 2 plays, 25 yards, 0:46; TIED 21–21)
- (5:13) OSU – Brennan Presley 3-yard run, Logan Ward kick (Drive: 5 plays, 80 yards, 1:32; OSU 28–21)
- (4:01) ARK – Luke Hasz 43-yard pass from Taylen Green, Kyle Ramsey kick (Drive: 3 plays, 75 yards, 1:12; TIED 28–28)
- (0:55) OSU – Logan Ward 38-yard field goal (Drive: 9 plays, 55 yards, 3:06; OSU 31–28)
- (0:00) ARK – Kyle Ramsey 45-yard field goal (Drive: 8 plays, 48 yards, 0:55; TIED 31–31)

Overtime

- (0:00) OSU – Ollie Gordon II 12-yard run, Ollie Gordon II pass (Drive: 3 plays, 25 yards, 0:00; OSU 39–31)

Statistics	ARK	OKST
First downs	33	21
Total yards	648	385
Rushing yards	232	59
Passing yards	416	326
Passing: Comp–Att–Int	26–46–1	27–48–1
Time of possession	36:14	23:46

Team	Category	Player	Statistics
Arkansas	Passing	Taylen Green	26/45, 416 yards, TD, INT
Arkansas	Rushing	Ja'Quinden Jackson	24 carries, 149 yards, 3 TD
Arkansas	Receiving	Andrew Armstrong	10 receptions, 164 yards
Oklahoma State	Passing	Alan Bowman	27/48, 326 yards, TD, INT
Oklahoma State	Rushing	Ollie Gordon II	17 carries, 49 yards, TD
Oklahoma State	Receiving	Brennan Presley	9 receptions, 91 yards, TD

=== at Tulsa (rivalry) ===
No. 13 Oklahoma State Cowboys (2–0) at Tulsa Golden Hurricane (1–1) – Game summary

Quarter	1	2	3	4	Total
No. 13 Cowboys	7	21	10	7	45
Golden Hurricane	0	0	0	10	10

at Skelly Field at H. A. Chapman Stadium • Tulsa, OK

- Date: September 14, 2024
- Game time: 11:00 a.m.
- Game weather: Sunny • Temperature: 78 °F (26 °C) • Wind: ESE at 12 mph (19 km/h)
- Game attendance: 30,195
- Referee: Henry Johns
- TV announcers (ESPN2): Beth Mowins (play-by-play), Rod Gilmore (analyst), and Lauren Sisler (sideline)

Game information

First quarter

- (8:38) OSU – Brennan Presley 1-yard pass from Alan Bowman, Logan Ward kick (Drive: 16 plays, 75 yards, 6:22; OSU 7–0)

Second quarter

- (12:47) OSU – De'Zhaun Stribling 8-yard pass from Alan Bowman, Logan Ward kick (Drive: 10 plays, 65 yards, 4:58; OSU 14–0)
- (9:05) OSU – Taylyn Shettron 78-yard pass from Alan Bowman, Logan Ward kick (Drive: 3 plays, 89 yards, 1:18; OSU 21–0)
- (3:23) OSU – Logan Ward 43-yard field goal (Drive: 4 plays, 3 yards, 2:11; OSU 24–0)

Third quarter

- (8:19) OSU – De'Zhaun Stribling 63-yard pass from Alan Bowman, Logan Ward kick (Drive: 2 plays, 75 yards, 0:31; OSU 35–0)
- (1:53) OSU – Logan Ward 43-yard field goal (Drive: 4 plays, 3 yards, 2:11; OSU 38–0)

Fourth quarter

- (10:05) OSU – Sesi Vailahi 1-yard rush, Logan Ward kick (Drive: 12 plays, 56 yards, 4:38; OSU 41–0)
- (6:15) TUL – Seth Morgan 43-yard field goal (Drive: 9 plays, 50 yards, 3:50; OSU 41–3)
- (1:55) TUL – Stephen Kittleman 9-yard rush, Seth Morgan kick (Drive: 4 plays, 64 yards, 1:30; OSU 41–10)

Statistics	OKST	TUL
First downs	24	19
Total yards	560	352
Rushing yards	129	116
Passing yards	431	236
Passing: Comp–Att–Int	28–39–1	19–37–1
Time of possession	30:55	29:05

Team	Category	Player	Statistics
Oklahoma State	Passing	Alan Bowman	24/31, 396 yards, 5 TDs, 1 INT
Oklahoma State	Rushing	Trent Howland	10 carries, 53 yards
Oklahoma State	Receiving	De'Zhaun Stribling	7 receptions, 174 yards, 2 TD
Tulsa	Passing	Kirk Francis	14/31, 153 yards, 1 INT
Tulsa	Rushing	Anthony Watkins	9 carries, 40 yards
Tulsa	Receiving	Kamdyn Benjamin	6 reactions, 94 yards

=== vs No. 12 Utah ===
No. 12 Utah Utes (3–0) vs No. 14 Oklahoma State Cowboys (3–0) – Game summary

Quarter	1	2	3	4	Total
No. 12 Utes	0	10	3	9	22
No. 14 Cowboys	3	0	0	16	19

at Boone Pickens Stadium • Stillwater, OK

- Date: September 21, 2024
- Game time: 3:00 p.m.
- Game weather: 100 °F (38 °C)
- Game attendance: 52,202
- Referee: Michael VanderVelde
- TV announcers (FOX/ESPN Radio): Jason Benetti (play-by-play), Brock Huard (analyst), and Allison Williams (sideline)/Marc Kestecher (play-by-play), Kelly Stouffer (analyst), and Ian Fitzsimmons (sideline)

Game information

First quarter

- (8:43) OSU – Logan Ward 23-yard field goal (Drive: 10 plays, 62 yards, 3:31; OSU 3–0)

Second quarter

- (14:56) UTA – Cole Becker 43-yard field goal (Drive: 12 plays, 62 yards, 5:43; Tied 3–3)
- (7:25) UTA – Brant Kuithe 1-yard rush, Cole Becker kick (Drive: 11 plays, 64 yards, 6:28; UTA 10–3)

Third quarter

- (2:39) UTA – Cole Becker 38-yard field goal (Drive: 5 plays, 69 yards, 2:59; UTA 13–3)

Fourth quarter

- (11:29) UTA – Cole Becker 44-yard field goal (Drive: 10 plays, 44 yards, 5:10; UTA 16–3)
- (6:21) UTA – Brant Kuithe 45-yard pass from Issac Wilson (Drive: 1 play, 45 yards, 0:10; UTA 22–3)
- (5:37) OSU – Brennan Presley 28-yard pass from Alan Bowman, Brennan Presley pass from Alan Bowman (Drive: 3 plays, 58 yards, 0:36; UTA 22–11)
- (1:47) OSU – Rashod Owens 9-yard pass from Alan Bowman, Brennan Presley pass from Alan Bowman (Drive: 7 plays, 69 yards, 1:29; UTA 22–19)

Statistics	UTAH	OKST
First downs	20	11
Total yards	456	285
Rushing yards	249	48
Passing yards	207	237
Passing: Comp–Att–Int	17–29–2	19–44–2
Time of possession	42:26	17:34

Team	Category	Player	Statistics
Utah	Passing	Isaac Wilson	17/29, 207 yards, 1 TD, 2 INT
Utah	Rushing	Micah Bernard	25 carries, 182 yards
Utah	Receiving	Dorian Singer	7 receptions, 95 yards
Oklahoma State	Passing	Alan Bowman	16/33, 206 yards, 2 TDs 2 INT
Oklahoma State	Rushing	Ollie Gordon	11 carries, 42 yards
Oklahoma State	Receiving	De'Zhaun Stribling	3 receptions, 50 yards

=== at No. 23 Kansas State ===
No. 20 Oklahoma State Cowboys (3–1) at No. 23 Kansas State Wildcats (3–1) – Game summary

Quarter	1	2	3	4	Total
No. 20 Cowboys	3	10	0	7	20
No. 23 Wildcats	7	14	14	7	42

at Bill Snyder Family Stadium • Manhattan, KS

- Date: September 28, 2024
- Game time: 11:00 a.m.
- Game weather: 70 °F (21 °C)
- Game attendance: 51,741
- Referee: Stephen Baron
- TV announcers (ESPN/Westwood One): Bob Wischusen (play-by-play), Louis Riddick (analyst), and Kris Budden (sideline reporter)/Nate Gatter (play-by-play) and Derek Rackley (sideline)

Game information

First quarter

- (9:17) KSU – Avery Johnson 11-yard rush, Chris Tennant kick (Drive: 14 pays, 75 yards, 5:43; KSU 7–0)
- (5:36) OSU – Logan Ward 35-yard field goal (Drive: 8 plays, 65 yards, 3:41; KSU 7–3)

Second quarter

- (10:07) OSU – De'Zhaun Stribling 77-yard pass from Alan Bowman, Logan Ward kick (Drive: 2 plays, 82 yards, 0:50; OSU 10–7)
- (7:30) OSU – Logan Ward 31-yard field goal (Drive: 5 plays, 19 yards, 2:30; OSU 13–7)
- (6:58) KSU – Garrett Oakley 19-yard pass from Avery Johnson, Chris Tennant kick (Drive: 2 plays, 71 yards, 0:32; KSU 14–13)
- (3:18) KSU – Jayce Brown 55-yard pass from Avery Johnson, Chris Tennant kick (Drive: 4 plays, 69 yards, 1:48; KSU 21–13)

Third quarter

- (13:07) KSU – DJ Giddens 66-yard rush, Chris Tennant kick (Drive: 2 plays, 73 yards, 0:50; KSU 28–13)
- (1:57) KSU – Will Anciaux 2-yard pass from Avery Johnson, Chris Tennant kick (Drive: 6 plays, 73 yards, 2:48; KSU 35–13)

Fourth quarter

- (11:26) KSU – Avery Johnson 13-yard rush, Chris Tennant kick (Drive: 9 plays, 80 yards, 3:50; KSU 42–13)
- (1:52) OSU – Trent Howland 14-yard rush, Logan Ward kick (Drive: 8 plays, 69 yards, 2:48; KSU 42–20)

Statistics	OKST	KSU
First downs	25	23
Total yards	490	559
Rushing yards	126	300
Passing yards	354	259
Passing: Comp–Att–Int	26–50–2	19–31–1
Time of possession	30:49	29:11

Team	Category	Player	Statistics
Oklahoma State	Passing	Alan Bowman	26/50, 364 yards, TD, 2 INT
Oklahoma State	Rushing	Ollie Gordon II	15 carries, 76 yards
Oklahoma State	Receiving	De'Zhaun Stribling	7 receptions, 157 yards, TD
Kansas State	Passing	Avery Johnson	19/31, 259 yards, 3 TD, INT
Kansas State	Rushing	DJ Giddens	15 carries, 187 yards, TD
Kansas State	Receiving	Jayce Brown	4 receptions, 78 yards, TD

=== vs West Virginia ===
West Virginia Mountaineers (2–2) vs Oklahoma State Cowboys (3–2) – Game summary

Quarter	1	2	3	4	Total
Mountaineers	10	21	0	7	38
Cowboys	0	7	0	7	14

at Boone Pickens Stadium • Stillwater, OK

- Date: October 5, 2024
- Game time: 3:00 p.m.
- Game weather: Sunny • Temperature: 93 °F (34 °C) • Wind: S at 12 mph (19 km/h)
- Game attendance: 52,202
- Referee: Mike McCabe
- TV announcers (ESPN2): Mike Monaco (play-by-play), Kirk Morrison (analyst), and Dawn Davenport (sideline)

Game information

First quarter

- (9:20) WVU – Michael Hayes II 39-yard field goal (Drive: 12 plays, 55 yards, 5:40; WVU 3–0)
- (0:55) WVU – Traylon Ray 10-yard pass from Nicco Marchiol, Michael Hayes II kick (Drive: 9 plays, 65 yards, 4:54; WVU 10–0)

Second quarter

- (11:16) WVU – Jaheim White 10-yard rush, Michael Hayes II kick (Drive: 6 plays, 63 yards, 3:29; WVU 17–0)
- (5:55) WVU – Garrett Greene 15-yard rush, Michael Hayes II kick (Drive: 8 plays, 87 yards, 3:44; WVU 24–0)
- (1:54) OSU – Rashod Owes 8-yard pass from Alan Bowman, Logan Ward kick (Drive: 11 plays, 75 yards, 4:01; WVU 24–7)
- (0:28) WVU – CJ Donaldson Jr. 15-yard rush, Michael Hayes II kick (Drive: 9 plays, 75 yards, 1:26; WVU 31–7)

Third quarter

- No Score

Fourth quarter

- (9:01) WVU – CJ Donaldson Jr. 1-yard rush, Michael Hayes II kick (Drive: 8 plays, 88 yards, 5:02; WVU 38–7)
- (8:30) OSU – De'Zhaun Stribbling 43-yard pass from Garret Rangel, Logan Ward kick (Drive: 2 plays, 65 yards, 0:31; WVU 38–14)

Statistics	WVU	OKST
First downs	31	11
Total yards	558	227
Rushing yards	389	36
Passing yards	169	191
Passing: Comp–Att–Int	10–16	14–24–2
Time of possession	42:20	17:14

Team	Category	Player	Statistics
West Virginia	Passing	Garrett Greene	9/15, 159 yards
West Virginia	Rushing	Jahiem White	19 carries, 158 yards, 1 TD
West Virginia	Receiving	Hudson Clement	3 receptions, 64 yards
Oklahoma State	Passing	Alan Bowman	10/19, 116 yards, 1 TD, 2 INT
Oklahoma State	Rushing	Ollie Gordon II	13 carries, 50 yards
Oklahoma State	Receiving	Da'Wain Lofton	3 receptions, 73 yards

=== at No. 13 BYU ===
Oklahoma State Cowboys (3–3) at No. 13 BYU Cougars (6–0) – Game summary

Quarter	1	2	3	4	Total
Cowboys	7	14	0	14	35
No. 13 Cougars	7	7	14	10	38

at LaVell Edwards Stadium • Provo, UT

- Date: October 18, 2024
- Game time: 9:15 p.m.
- Game weather: 45 °F (7 °C)
- Game attendance: 62,841
- Referee: Luke Richmond
- TV announcers (ESPN): Anish Shroff (play-by-play), Andre Ware (analyst), and Paul Carcaterra (sideline)

Game information

First quarter

- (11:57) BYU – Jake Retzlaff 4-yard rush, Will Ferrin kick (Drive: 6 plays, 75 yards, 3:03; BYU 7–0)
- (9:42) OSU – Ollie Gordon II 50-yard rush, Logan Ward kick (Drive: 5 plays, 75 yards, 2:15; Tied 7–7)

Second quarter

- (14:01) BYU – LJ Martin 1-yard rush, Will Ferrin kick (Drive: 1 play, 1 yard, 0:04; BYU 14–7)
- (7:55) OSU – Ollie Gordon II 17-yard pass from Garrett Rangel, Logan Ward kick (Drive: 10 plays, 75 yards, 6:06; Tied 14–14)
- (0:32) OSU – Ollie Gordon II 2-yard rush, Logan Ward kick (Drive: 7 plays, 76 yards, 3:12; OSU 21–14)

Third quarter

- (5:51) BYU – LJ Martin 8-yard rush, Will Ferrin kick (Drive: 7 plays, 69 yards, 4:01; Tied 21–21)
- (3:43) BYU – Keelan Marion 34-yard pass from Jake Retzlaff, Will Ferrin kick (Drive: 4 plays, 44 yards, 2:01; BYU 28–21)

Fourth quarter

- (14:50) OSU – Brennan Presley 16-yard pass from Alan Bowman, Logan Ward kick (Drive: 9 plays, 79 yards, 3:53; Tied 28–28)
- (9:39) BYU – Will Ferrin 41-yard field goal (Drive: 11 plays, 52 yards, 5:11; BYU 31–28)
- (1:13) OSU – Brennan Presley 6-yard pass from Alan Bowman, Logan Ward kick (Drive: 17 plays, 76 yards, 8:26; OSU 35–31)
- (0:10) BYU – Darius Lassister 35-yard pass from Jake Retzlaff, Will Ferrin kick (Drive: 8 plays, 75 yards, 1:02; BYU 38–35)

Statistics	OKST	BYU
First downs	22	25
Total yards	421	473
Rushing yards	269	255
Passing yards	152	218
Passing: Comp–Att–Int	18–29–2	13–28–1
Time of possession	31:43	28:17

Team	Category	Player	Statistics
Oklahoma State	Passing	Alan Bowman	11/19, 85 yards, 1 TD, 1 INT
Oklahoma State	Rushing	Ollie Gordon II	16 carries, 107 yards, 2 TD
Oklahoma State	Receiving	Brennan Presley	5 receptions, 43 yards, 1 TD
BYU	Passing	Jake Retzlaff	13/26, 218 yards, 2 TD, 2 INT
BYU	Rushing	LJ Martin	20 carries, 120 yards, 2 TD
BYU	Receiving	Darius Lassiter	6 receptions, 129 yards, 1 TD

=== at Baylor ===
Oklahoma State Cowboys (3–4) at Baylor Bears (3–4) – Game summary

Quarter	1	2	3	4	Total
Cowboys	3	14	3	8	28
Bears	3	14	7	14	38

at McLane Stadium • Waco, TX

- Date: October 26, 2024
- Game time: 2:30 p.m.
- Game weather: Sunny, 87 °F (31 °C)
- Game attendance: 44,987
- Referee: Michael VanderVelde
- TV announcers (ESPN+): Ted Emrich (play-by-play) and Charles Arbuckle (analyst)

Game information

First quarter

- (10:00) OSU – Logan Ward 45-yard field goal (Drive: 7 plays, 32 yards, 2:39; OSU 3–0)
- (5:55) BAY – Isaiah Hankins 30-yard field goal (Drive: 10 plays, 74 yards, 3:59; Tied 3–3)

Second quarter

- (12:42) BAY – Sawyer Robertson 12-yard pass to Hal Presley, Isaiah Hankins kick (Drive: 4 plays, 99 yards, 1:36; BAY 10–3)
- (9:22) OSU – Alan Bowman 33-yard pass to Brennan Presley, Logan Ward kick (Drive: 7 plays, 75 yards, 3:20; Tied 10–10)
- (6:28) BAY – Sawyer Robertson 1-yard pass to Matthew Klopfenstein, Isaiah Hankins kick (Drive: 6 plays, 73 yards, 2:48; BAY 17–10)
- (0:18) OSU – Ollie Gordon II 2-yard rush, Logan Ward kick (Drive: 10 plays, 64 yards, 3:06; Tied 17–17)

Third quarter

- (8:32) BAY – Sawyer Robertson 33-yard pass to Ashtyn Hawkins, Isaiah Hankins kick (Drive: 3 plays, 57 yards, 0:59; BAY 24–17)
- (2:49) OSU – Logan Ward 26-yard field goal (Drive: 9 plays, 75 yards, 5:37; BAY 24–20)

Fourth quarter

- (8:55) BAY – Sawyer Robertson 41-yard rush, Isaiah Hankins kick (Drive: 8 plays, 95 yards, 3:18; BAY 31–20)
- (4:51) OSU – Ollie Gordon II 3-yard rush, Ollie Gordon II 2 point pass to Brennan Presley (Drive: 11 plays, 75 yards, 4:04; BAY 31–28)
- (3:06) BAY – Dawson Pendergrass 55-yard rush, Isaiah Hankins kick (Drive: 4 plays, 75 yards, 1:45; BAY 38–28)

Statistics	OKST	BAY
First downs	25	23
Total yards	433	565
Rushing yards	74	343
Passing yards	359	222
Passing: Comp–Att–Int	28–42–1	11–20–1
Time of possession	35:01	24:59

Team	Category	Player	Statistics
Oklahoma State	Passing	Alan Bowman	28/42, 359 yards, 1 TD, 1 INT
Oklahoma State	Rushing	Ollie Gordon	18 carries, 77 yards, 2 TD
Oklahoma State	Receiving	Brennan Presley	15 receptions, 183 yards, 1 TD
Baylor	Passing	Sawyer Robertson	11/19, 222 yards, 3 TD, 1 INT
Baylor	Rushing	Dawson Pendergrass	6 carries, 142 yards, 1 TD
Baylor	Receiving	Ashtyn Hawkins	4 receptions, 74 yards, 1 TD

=== vs Arizona State ===
Arizona State Sun Devils (5–2) vs Oklahoma State Cowboys (3–5) – Game summary

Quarter	1	2	3	4	Total
Sun Devils	7	14	7	14	42
Cowboys	0	14	0	7	21

at Boone Pickens Stadium • Stillwater, OK

- Date: November 2, 2024
- Game time: 2:30 p.m.
- Game weather: 67 °F (19 °C)
- Game attendance: 52,2202
- Referee: Cravonne Barrett
- TV announcers (FOX/FS2): Connor Onion (play-by-play) and Mark Helfrich (analyst)

Game information

First quarter

- (11:21) ASU – Sam Leavitt 22-yard pass to Jordyn Tyson, Parker Lewis kick (Drive: 8 plays, 75 yards, 3:39; ASU 7–0)

Second quarter

- (12:48) OSU – Alan Bowman 1-yard pass to Brennan Presley, Logan Ward kick (Drive: 6 plays, 53 yards, 0:14; Tied 7–7)
- (9:18) ASU – Sam Leavitt 50-yard pass to Cam Skattebo, Parker Lewis kick (Drive: 7 plays, 75 yards, 3:30; ASU 14–7)
- (5:26) OSU – Ollie Gordon II 2-yard rush, Logan Ward kick (Drive: 10 plays, 75 yards, 3:52; Tied 14–14)
- (0:20) ASU – Cam Skattebo 1-yard rush, Parker Lewis kick (Drive: 13 plays, 75 yards, 5:06; ASU 21–14)

Third quarter

- (5:19) ASU – Keystone Brown 7-yard rush, Parker Lewis kick (Drive: 8 plays, 61 yards, 3:04; ASU 28–14)

Fourth quarter

- (14:12) ASU – Sam Leavitt 36-yard pass to Cam Skattebo, Parker Lewis kick (Drive: 9 plays, 88 yards, 4:16; ASU 35–14)
- (10:22) ASU – Kyson Brown 1-yard rush, Parker Lewis kick (Drive: 5 plays, 34 yards, 2:38; ASU 42–14)
- (4:11) OSU – Sesi Valiahi 11-yard rush, Logan Ward kick (Drive: 7 plays, 49 yards, 2:53: ASU 42–21)

Statistics	ASU	OKST
First downs	26	16
Total yards	529	270
Rushing yards	225	81
Passing yards	304	189
Passing: Comp–Att–Int	20–29	19–33–1
Time of possession	38:31	21:29

Team	Category	Player	Statistics
Arizona State	Passing	Sam Leavitt	20/29, 304 yards, 3 TD
Arizona State	Rushing	Cam Skattebo	23 carries, 153 yards, 1 TD
Arizona State	Receiving	Cam Skattebo	4 receptions, 121 yards, 2 TD
Oklahoma State	Passing	Alan Bowman	18/31, 178 yards, 1 TD, 1 INT
Oklahoma State	Rushing	Ollie Gordon II	11 carries, 25 yards, 1 TD
Oklahoma State	Receiving	De'Zhaun Stribling	5 receptions, 77 yards

=== at TCU ===
Oklahoma State Cowboys (3–6) at TCU Horned Frogs (5–4) – Game summary

Quarter	1	2	3	4	Total
Cowboys	0	0	6	7	13
Horned Frogs	10	14	7	7	38

at Amon G. Carter Stadium • Fort Worth, TX

- Date: November 9, 2024
- Game time: 6:00 p.m.
- Game weather: 67 °F (19 °C)
- Game attendance: 45,348
- Referee: Henry Johns
- TV announcers (FS1): Eric Collins (play-by-play) and Spencer Tillman (analyst)

Game information

First quarter

- (11:26) TCU – Kyle Lemmermann 32-yard field goal (Drive: 10 plays, 61 yards, 3:34; TCU 3–0)
- (1:49) TCU – Cam Cook 18-yard rush, Kyle Lemmermann kick (Drive: 7 plays, 63 yards, 3:12; TCU 10–0)

Second quarter

- (6:30) TCU – Savion Williams 1-yard rush, Kyle Lemmermann kick (Drive: 11 plays, 68 yards, 5:03; TCU 17–0)
- (0:07) TCU – Josh Hoover 6-yard pass to Savion Williams, Kyle Lemmermann kick (Drive: 9 plays, 76 yards, 3:12; TCU 24–0)

Third quarter

- (10:24) OSU – Ollie Gordon II 2-yard rush (Drive: 11 plays, 78 yards, 4:27; OSU 24–6)
- (5:26) TCU – Cam Cook 4-yard rush, Kyle Lemmermann kick (Drive: 11 plays, 69 yards, 4:53; TCU 31–6)

Fourth quarter

- (13:52) OSU – Alan Bowman 8-yard pass to De'Zhaun Stribling, Logan Ward kick (Drive: 15 plays, 94 yards, 6:30; TCU 31–13)
- (13:02) TCU – Jordyn Bailey 59-yard rush, Kyle Lemmerman kick (Drive: 2 plays, 75 yards, 0:50; TCU 38–13)

Statistics	OKST	TCU
First downs	25	27
Total yards	368	468
Rushing yards	135	175
Passing yards	233	293
Passing: Comp–Att–Int	25–37–2	28–37
Time of possession	32:20	27:40

Team	Category	Player	Statistics
Oklahoma State	Passing	Alan Bowman	19/29, 141 yards, 1 TD, 1 INT
Oklahoma State	Rushing	Ollie Gordon II	25 carries, 121 yards, 1 TD
Oklahoma State	Receiving	De'Zhaun Stribling	7 receptions, 101 yards, 1 TD
TCU	Passing	Josh Hoover	26/35, 286 yards, 1 TD
TCU	Rushing	Jordyn Bailey	1 carry, 59 yards, 1 TD
TCU	Receiving	JP Richardson	7 receptions, 100 yards

=== vs Texas Tech ===
Texas Tech Red Raiders (6–4) vs Oklahoma State Cowboys (3–7) – Game summary

Quarter	1	2	3	4	Total
Red Raiders	14	7	14	21	56
Cowboys	7	7	14	20	48

at Boone Pickens Stadium • Stillwater, OK

- Date: November 23, 2024
- Game time: 2:30 p.m.
- Game weather: 72 °F (22 °C)
- Game attendance: 52,202
- Referee: Mike McCabe
- TV announcers (ESPN+): James Westling (play-by-play) and Jay Sonnhalter (analyst)

Game information

First quarter

- (13:27) TTU – Behren Morton 12-yard pass to Caleb Douglas, Gino Garcia kick (Drive: 6 plays, 75 yards, 1:29; TTU 7–0)
- (4:04) TTU – Behren Morton 8-yard pass to Mason Tharp, Gino Garcia kick (Drive: 14 plays, 91 yards, 5:29; TTU 14–0)
- (0:23) OSU – Ollie Gordon II 68-yard rush, Logan Ward kick (Drive: 3 plays, 91 yards, 1:12; TTU 14–7)

Second quarter

- (5:23) OSU – Ollie Gordon II 1-yard rush, Logan Ward kick (Drive: 7 plays, 45 yards, 2:57; Tied 14–14)
- (0:05) TTU – Behren Morton 25-yard pass to Tahj Brooks, Gino Garcia kick (Drive: 12 plays, 92 yards, 2:13; TTU 21–14)

Third quarter

- (13:14) OSU – Ollie Gordon II 2-yard rush, Logan Ward kick (Drive: 5 plays, 75 yards, 1:46; Tied 21–21)
- (10:26) TTU – Behren Morton 32-yard pass to Jalin Conyers, Gino Garcia kick (Drive: 9 plays, 81 yards, 2:43; TTU 28–21)
- (8:47) OSU – Maealiuaki Smith 13-yard rush, Logan Ward kick (Drive: 4 plays, 75 yards, 1:39; Tied 28–28)
- (6:12) TTU – Tahj Brooks 2-yard rush, Gino Garcia kick (Drive: 6 plays, 18 yards, 2:30; TTU 35–28)

Fourth quarter

- (13:19) OSU – Maealiuaki Smith 14-yard pass to De'Zhaun Stribling, Logan Ward kick (Drive: 6 plays, 43 yards, 1:50; Tied 35–35)
- (10:42) TTU – Tahj Brooks 40-yard rush, Gino Garcia kick (Drive: 5 plays, 69 yards, 2:32; TTU 42–35)
- (8:37) OSU – Rodney Field Jr. 19-yard rush, Logan Ward kick (Drive: 5 plays, 65 yards, 2:05; Tied 42–42)
- (6:12) TTU – Taj Brooks 1-yard rush, Gino Garcia kick (Drive: 7 plays, 53 yards, 2:17; TTU 49–42)
- (4:45) TTU – Jacob Rodriguez 0-yard fumble return, Gino Garcia kick (Drive: 3 plays, -16 yards, 1:21; TTU 56–42)
- (2:35) OSU – Maealiuaki Smith 10-yard pass to Rashod Owens (Drive: 8 plays, 69 yards, 2:06; TTU 56–48)

Statistics	TTU	OKST
First downs	31	32
Total yards	544	556
Rushing yards	140	203
Passing yards	404	353
Passing: Comp–Att–Int	37–53–1	27–37–1
Time of possession	32:51	27:05

Team	Category	Player	Statistics
Texas Tech	Passing	Behren Morton	35/50, 366 yards, 4 TD, 1 INT
Texas Tech	Rushing	Tahj Brooks	28 carries, 133 yards, 3 TD
Texas Tech	Receiving	Caleb Douglas	5 receptions, 105 yards, 1 TD
Oklahoma State	Passing	Maealiuaki Smith	26/36, 326 yards, 2 TD, 1 INT
Oklahoma State	Rushing	Ollie Gordon II	15 carries, 156 yards, 3 TD
Oklahoma State	Receiving	De'Zhaun Stribling	7 receptions, 133 yards, 1 TD

=== at No. 25 Colorado ===
Oklahoma State Cowboys (3–8) at No. 25 Colorado Buffaloes (8–3) – Game summary

Quarter	1	2	3	4	Total
Cowboys	0	0	0	0	0
No.25 Buffaloes	21	0	17	14	52

at Folsom Field • Boulder, CO

- Date: November 29, 2024
- Game time: 11:00 a.m.
- Game weather: 33 °F (1 °C)
- Game attendance: 51,030
- Referee: David Alvarez
- TV announcers (ABC): Mark Jones (play-by-play), Roddy Jones (analyst), and Quint Kessenich (sideline)

Game information

First quarter

- (12:03) CU – Micah Welch 1-yard rush, Alejandro Mata kick (Drive: 3 plays, 24 yards, 1:12; CU 7–0)
- (3:47) CU – Shedder Sanders 10-yard pass to LaJohtay Wester, Alejandro Mata kick (Drive: 11 plays, 64 yards, 5:48; CU 14–0)
- (2:09) CU – Shedeur Sanders 11-yard pass to Travis Hunter, Alejandro Mata kick (Drive: 3 plays, 28 yards, 1:14; CU 21–0)

Second quarter

- No Score

Third quarter

- (14:02) CU – Shedeur Sanders 69-yard pass to LaJohntay Wester, Alejandro Meto kick (Drive: 3 plays, 75 yards, 0:58; CU 28–0)
- (10:50) CU – Shedder Sanders 8-yard pass to Travis Hunter, Alejandro Meto kick (Drive: 4 plays, 25 yards, 1:53; CU 35–0)
- (4:31) CU – Alejandro Mata 33-yard field goal (Drive: 8 plays, 42 yards, 3:52; CU 38–0)

Fourth quarter

- (14:25) CU – DJ McKinney 13-yard interception return, Cristiano Palazzo kick (Drive: 2 plays, -6 yards, 0:35; CU 45–0)
- (11:05) CU – Shedeur Sanders 23-yard pass to Travis Hunter, Alejandro Mata kick (Drive: 6 plays, 69 yards, 2:21; CU 52–0)

Statistics	OKST	COLO
First downs	10	26
Total yards	147	471
Rushing yards	70	33
Passing yards	77	438
Passing: Comp–Att–Int	12–34–2	34–42–1
Time of possession	27:31	32:29

Team	Category	Player	Statistics
Oklahoma State	Passing	Maealiuaki Smith	11/29, 70 yards, 2 INT
Oklahoma State	Rushing	Trent Howland	9 carries, 57 yards
Oklahoma State	Receiving	Brennan Presley	8 receptions, 42 yards
Colorado	Passing	Shedeur Sanders	34/41, 438 yards, 5 TD, 1 INT
Colorado	Rushing	Micah Welch	12 carries, 39 yards, 1 TD
Colorado	Receiving	LaJohntay Wester	11 receptions, 175 yards, 2 TD

== Rankings ==
Ranking movements Legend: ██ Increase in ranking ██ Decrease in ranking — = Not ranked RV = Received votes
	Week																
Poll	Pre	1	2	3	4	5	6	7	8	9	10	11	12	13	14	15	Final
AP	17	16	13	14	20	RV	—	—	—	—	—	—	—	—	—	—	—
Coaches	18	17	14	15	20	RV	—	—	—	—	—	—	—	—	—	—	—
CFP	Not released										—	—	—	—	—	—	Not released
