= 2019 Oklahoma State Cowboys football team =

American college football season

2019 Oklahoma State Cowboys football

Texas Bowl, L 21–24 vs. Texas A&M
- Conference: Big 12 Conference
- Record: 8–5 (5–4 Big 12)
- Head coach: Mike Gundy (15th season)
- Offensive coordinator: Sean Gleeson (1st season)
- Offensive scheme: Spread option
- Defensive coordinator: Jim Knowles (2nd season)
- Base defense: 4–2–5
- Home stadium: Boone Pickens Stadium

2019 Big 12 Conference football standings
	Conf.			Overall
Team	W		L	W		L
No. 7 Oklahoma y$^	8	–	1	12	–	2
No. 13 Baylor y	8	–	1	11	–	3
No. 25 Texas	5	–	4	8	–	5
Oklahoma State	5	–	4	8	–	5
Kansas State	5	–	4	8	–	5
Iowa State	5	–	4	7	–	6
West Virginia	3	–	6	5	–	7
TCU	3	–	6	5	–	7
Texas Tech	2	–	7	4	–	8
Kansas	1	–	8	3	–	9
Championship: Oklahoma 30, Baylor 23 ^{OT}
^ – College Football Playoff participant; $ – Conference champion; y – Championship game participant; Rankings from AP Poll

The 2019 OSU Cowboys football team represented Oklahoma State University in the 2019 NCAA Division I FBS football season. The Cowboys played their home games at Boone Pickens Stadium at Stillwater, Oklahoma, and competed in the Big 12 Conference. They were led by 15th-year head coach Mike Gundy.

== Preseason ==
=== Coaching changes ===
In January 2019, head coach Mike Gundy announced the hiring of Sean Gleeson to be the new offensive coordinator, replacing Mike Yurcich, who left to take an assistant coaching position at Ohio State. Gleeson was previously the offensive coordinator at Princeton, where he coached the highest-scoring offense in FCS in 2018.

=== Recruiting ===
Oklahoma State signed a total of 21 recruits in its 2019 class. The class was ranked at No. 37 in the nation and fifth in the Big 12 Conference according to the 247Sports.com Composite.

=== Big 12 media poll ===
The 2019 Big 12 media days were held July 15–16, 2019 in Frisco, Texas. In the Big 12 preseason media poll, Oklahoma State was predicted to finish in fifth in the standings.

=== Preseason All-Big 12 teams ===
To be released

== Schedule ==
Oklahoma State began the year with three non-conference games: on the road to play Oregon State of the Pac-12 Conference, at home against McNeese State of the Southland Conference, and on the road against Tulsa of the American Athletic Conference. In Big 12 Conference play, the Cowboys would play five home games against Kansas State, Baylor, TCU, Kansas, and Oklahoma; and four road games against Texas, Texas Tech, Iowa State, and West Virginia.

Date	Time	Opponent	Rank	Site	TV	Result	Attendance
August 30	9:30 p.m.	at Oregon State*		Reser Stadium; Corvallis, OR	FS1	W 52–36	31,681
September 7	7:00 p.m.	McNeese State*		Boone Pickens Stadium; Stillwater, OK	ESPN+	W 56–14	55,509
September 14	2:30 p.m.	at Tulsa*		H.A. Chapman Stadium; Tulsa, OK (rivalry)	ESPN2	W 40–21	28,612
September 21	6:30 p.m.	at No. 12 Texas		Darrell K Royal–Texas Memorial Stadium; Austin, TX	ABC	L 30–36	96,936
September 28	6:00 p.m.	No. 24 Kansas State		Boone Pickens Stadium; Stillwater, OK	ESPN+	W 26–13	55,509
October 5	11:00 a.m.	at Texas Tech	No. 21	Jones AT&T Stadium; Lubbock, TX	FS1	L 35–45	56,479
October 19	3:00 p.m.	No. 18 Baylor^{†}		Boone Pickens Stadium; Stillwater, OK	FOX	L 27–45	55,060
October 26	2:30 p.m.	at No. 23 Iowa State		Jack Trice Stadium; Ames, IA	FS1	W 34–27	61,500
November 2	2:30 p.m.	TCU		Boone Pickens Stadium; Stillwater, OK	ESPN	W 34–27	52,861
November 16	11:00 a.m.	Kansas	No. 22	Boone Pickens Stadium; Stillwater, OK	FS1	W 31–13	55,388
November 23	11:00 a.m.	at West Virginia	No. 21	Mountaineer Field; Morgantown, WV	ESPN2	W 20–13	46,022
November 30	7:00 p.m.	No. 7 Oklahoma	No. 21	Boone Pickens Stadium; Stillwater, OK (Bedlam Series)	FOX	L 16–34	54,575
December 27	5:45 p.m.	vs. Texas A&M*	No. 25	NRG Stadium; Houston, TX (Texas Bowl)	ESPN	L 21–24	68,415
*Non-conference game; ^{†}Homecoming; Rankings from AP Poll and CFP Rankings after November 5 released prior to game; All times are in Central time

== Roster ==
2019 Oklahoma State Cowboys football team roster
Players
Coaches
Offense

Pos.	#	Name	Class
WR	1	Landon Wolf	Jr
WR	2	Tylan Wallace	Jr
QB	3	Spencer Sanders	Fr
RB	4	Deondrick Glass	Fr
QB	6	Dru Brown	Sr
RB	7	LD Brown	Jr
WR	8	Braydon Johnson	So
QB	9	Brendan Costello	Fr
WR	10	Tyrell Alexander	Jr
WR	12	Jordan McCray	Sr
QB	13	Nolan McLean	Fr
QB	14	Peyton Thompson	Fr
WR	15	Jonathan Shepherd	Fr
WR	17	Dillon Stoner	Jr
QB	18	Shaun Taylor	Fr
RB	22	Mbari Snoddy	Fr
RB	23	Darius Salters	Jr
RB	25	Andre Washington	Fr
RB	26	Micah Cooper	Jr
RB	27	Dezmon Jackson	Jr
RB	30	Chuba Hubbard	So
WR	30	Gabe Simpson	Fr
WR	31	Taje Williams	Sr
WR	35	C. J. Moore	Fr
WR	38	Jacob Morris	Fr
TE	41	Valek Cisneros	Fr
TE	48	Price Daube	Fr
OL	50	Ry Schneider	Jr
OL	52	Jacob Ferrell	Fr
OL	54	Truett Knox	Fr
OL	57	Walker Reed	Jr
OL	58	Leyton Ernst	Fr
OL	60	Tyrese Williams	Fr
OL	61	Jake Springfield	Fr
OL	65	Matt McClurg	So
OL	66	Joe Michalski	Fr
OL	67	Cole Birmingham	Fr
OL	68	Taylor Miterko	Fr
OL	70	Hunter Woodard	Fr
OL	72	Johnny Wilson	Sr
OL	73	Teven Jenkins	Jr
OL	74	Preston Wilson	Fr
OL	75	Marcus Keyes	Sr
OL	76	Dylan Galloway	Jr
OL	77	Hunter Anthony	Fr
OL	78	Bryce Bray	Fr
OL	79	Matt Kegel	Jr
WR	80	L. C. Greenwood	So
WR	81	Cole Goodnight	Fr
WR	83	Cade Cavender	Fr
TE	84	Dayton Metcalf	Jr
TE	87	Logan Carter	Jr
WR	88	Langston Anderson	Fr
TE	89	Jelani Woods	So

Defense

Pos.	#	Name	Class
LB	1	Calvin Bundage	Sr
S	2	Tanner McCalister	So
S	3	Tre Sterling	So
CB	4	A. J. Green	Sr
CB	5	Kemah Siverand	Sr
CB	8	Rodarius Williams	Jr
LB	11	Amen Ogbongbemiga	Jr
S	12	Kanion Williams	Fr
CB	13	Thomas Harper	Fr
CB	14	Bryce Balous	Sr
LB	16	Devin Harper	Jr
S	18	Sean Michael Flanagan	Fr
LB	20	Malcolm Rodriguez	Jr
CB	22	DeMarco Jones	Fr
S	23	Gabe Lemons	Fr
CB	24	Jarrick Bernard-Converse	So
S	25	Jason Taylor II	Fr
S	31	Kolby Harvell-Peel	So
DT	35	Samuela Tuihalamaka	Fr
LB	36	Na'Drian Dizadare	Fr
DE	37	Isreal Isuman-Hundley	Fr
LB	38	Philip Redwine-Bryant	Sr
CB	39	Trevor Ailey	Fr
DE	40	Brock Martin	So
LB	41	Braden Spicer	Fr
DT	42	Jayden Jernigan	Fr
LB	44	Kamryn Farrar	Fr
LB	47	Carson Kropp	Fr
LB	48	Adam Martin	So
CB	49	Aeneas Favors	Fr
LB	50	Relijah Sherman	So
DE	52	Ben Kopenski	Fr
DT	53	Grant Mahon	Fr
DT	56	Xavier Ross	Fr
DT	63	Dylon Carnagey	Fr
DT	70	Kevin Mair	Fr
DE	82	Vance Mullendore	Fr
DE	83	Gordie Geymuller	Fr
DE	88	Jake Schultz	Fr
DE	89	Tyler Lacy	Fr
DE	90	Braden Cassity	Fr
DE	91	Mike Scott	Sr
DT	92	Cameron Murray	Jr
DE	94	Trace Ford	Fr
DT	95	Israel Antwine	So
DE	96	Koby Walterscheid	Fr
DT	97	Amadou Fofana	Jr
DT	98	Brendon Evers	So
DT	99	Sione Asi	Jr

Special teams

Pos.	#	Name	Class
K	19	Alex Hale	Fr
P	29	Tom Hutton	Fr
K	39	Jake McClure	So
K	49	Matt Ammendola	Sr
LS	53	Matt Hembrough	So
LS	63	Braedy Wilson	Fr
P	69	Ben Freehill	Fr

Head coach

- Mike Gundy

Coordinators/assistant coaches

- Kasey Dunn – Associate head coach/offensive coordinator/wide receivers
- Jim Knowles – Defensive coordinator/linebackers
- Joe Bob Clements – Defensive line
- Charlie Dickey – Offensive line
- Tim Rattay – Quarterbacks
- John Wozniak – Running backs
- Tim Duffie – Cornerbacks
- Jason McEndoo – Tight ends/Cowboy Backs
- Dan Hammerschmidt – Safeties
- Greg Richmond – Defensive line
- Rob Glass – Strength and conditioning
- Bill Clay – Defensive analyst
- Gary Gibbs – Defensive analyst
- Bradley Thomas – Defensive analyst
- Chris Thurmond – Defensive analyst
- M. K. Taylor – Special Teams Analyst
- Mack Butler – Director, Football Operations
- Rod Johnson – Assistant director of football operations
- Johnny Barr – Director, Football Relations
- Todd Bradford – Director, Football Recruiting
- Mike Groce – Coordinator, Football Recruiting
- Beni Tonga – Player Development Specialist
- Lorenzo Joe – Offensive quality control
- Drake Smithton – Offensive quality control
- Koy McFarland – Defensive quality control
- Josh Gonzales – Prospect Analyst
- Victor Irokanski – Prospect Analyst
- Robert Luce – Prospect Analyst
- Joe Reynolds – Prospect Analyst
- Ryan Simmons – Prospect Analyst
- Patrick Cashmore – Graduate assistant
- Matt Clements – Graduate assistant
- Shane Eachus – Graduate assistant
- Chris Meyers – Graduate assistant

Legend

- (C) Team captain
- (S) Suspended
- (I) Ineligible
- Injured
- Redshirt

Roster
Last update: 10/21/22

== Game summaries ==
=== at Oregon State ===
Oklahoma State Cowboys (0–0) vs. Oregon State Beavers (0–0)

Quarter	1	2	3	4	Total
Oklahoma State	7	24	14	7	52
Oregon State	10	6	7	13	36

at Reser Stadium • Corvallis, Oregon

- Date: August 30, 2019
- Game time: 9:35 p.m. CDT
- Game weather: Temperature: 73 • Wind:SE2 (MPH) • Weather: Sunny
- Game attendance: 31,681
- Referee: Brad Van Vark
- TV announcers (FS1): Justin Kutcher (Play-By-Play), Petros Papadakis (Analysts) & Shane Vereen (Analysts)

Game information

First Quarter

- (13:06) ORST – Isaiah Hodgins 29-yard pass from Jake Luton, Jordan Choukair kick (Drive: 6 plays, 70 yards, 1:54; Oregon State 7–0)
- (9:13) OKST – Chuba Hubbard 6-yard run, Matt Ammendola kick (Drive: 9 plays, 70 yards, 3:53; Tied 7–7)
- (3:42) ORST – Jordan Choukair 30-yard field goal (Drive: 14 plays, 61 yards, 5:31; Oregon State 10–7)

Second Quarter

- (13:33) OKST – Matt Ammendola 23-yard field goal (Drive: 14 plays, 71 yards, 5:09; Tied 10–10)
- (9:41) OKST – LD Brown 5-yard run, Matt Ammendola kick (Drive: 7 plays, 86 yards, 2:34; Oklahoma State 17–10)
- (6:45) OKST – Tylan Wallace 36-yard pass from Spencer Sanders, Matt Ammendola kick (Drive: 5 plays, 51 yards, 1:51; Oklahoma State 24–10)
- (2:02) OKST – Tylan Wallace 21-yard pass from Spencer Sanders, Matt Ammendola kick (Drive: 8 plays, 80 yards, 3:14; Oklahoma State 31–10)
- (0:03) ORST – Tyjon Lindsey 1-yard pass from Jake Luton (Drive: 14 plays, 75 yards, 1:59; Oklahoma State 31–16)

Third Quarter

- (12:20) OKST – Chuba Hubbard 2-yard run, Matt Ammendola kick (Drive: 10 plays, 70 yards, 2:40; Oklahoma State 38–16)
- (9:50) ORST – Isaiah Hodgins 9-yard pass from Jake Luton, Jordan Choukair kick (Drive: 6 plays, 73 yards, 2:30; Oklahoma State 38–23)
- (7:54) OKST – Chuba Hubbard 53-yard run, Matt Ammendola kick (Drive: 6 plays, 75 yards, 1:56; Oklahoma State 45–23)

Fourth Quarter

- (13:08) ORST – Jack Colletto 1-yard run (Drive: 14 plays, 64 yards, 5:16; Oklahoma State 45–29)
- (9:39) OKST – C. J. Moore 11-yard pass from Spencer Sanders, Matt Ammendola kick (Drive: 8 plays, 75 yards, 3:29; Oklahoma State 52–29)
- (1:19) ORST – Kolby Taylor 5-yard pass from Tristan Gebbia, Jordan Choukair kick (Drive: 11 plays, 80 yards, 2:41; Oklahoma State 52–36)

Statistics	OKST	OSU
First downs	30	26
Total yards	555	448
Rushes/yards	52–352	37–167
Passing yards	203	281
Passing: Comp–Att–Int	19–24–0	26–49–0
Time of possession	30:24	29:36

Team	Category	Player	Statistics
Oklahoma State	Passing	Spencer Sanders	19/24, 203 yards, 3 TD
Oklahoma State	Rushing	Chuba Hubbard	26 carries, 221 yards, 3 TD
Oklahoma State	Receiving	Tylan Wallace	5 receptions, 92 yards, 2 TD
Oregon State	Passing	Jake Luton	23/42, 251 yards, 3 TD
Oregon State	Rushing	Jermar Jefferson	16 carries, 87 yards
Oregon State	Receiving	Isaiah Hodgins	9 receptions, 170 yards, 2 TD

=== Vs. McNeese State ===
McNeese State Cowboys (1–0) vs. Oklahoma State Cowboys (1–0)

Quarter	1	2	3	4	Total
McNeese	0	0	7	7	14
Oklahoma State	14	14	28	0	56

at Boone Pickens Stadium • Stillwater, Oklahoma

- Date: September 7, 2019
- Game time: 6:00 p.m. CDT
- Game weather: Temperature: 95 • Wind:SE 12 (MPH) • Weather: Sunny
- Game attendance: 55,509
- Referee: Christian Watson
- TV announcers (ESPN+): Dave LaMont (Play-By-Play) & Barrett Brooks (Analysts)

Game information

First Quarter

- (15:00) OKST – A. J. Green 27-yard interception return, Matt Ammendola kick (Drive: 2 plays, 1 yards, 0:45; Oklahoma State 7–0)
- (1:29) OKST – Tylan Wallace 69-yard pass from Spencer Sanders, Matt Ammendola kick (Drive: 2 plays, 73 yards, 0:30; Oklahoma State 14–0)

Second Quarter

- (7:43) OKST – Chuba Hubbard 4-yard run, Matt Ammendola kick (Drive: 15 plays, 91 yards, 4:13; Oklahoma State 21–0)
- (1:29) OKST – Tylan Wallace 4-yard pass from Spencer Sanders, Matt Ammendola kick (Drive: 11 plays, 91 yards, 3:30; Oklahoma State 28–0)

Third Quarter

- (14:48) OKST – Tylan Wallace 75-yard pass from Spencer Sanders, Matt Ammendola kick (Drive: 1 plays, 75 yards, 0:12; Oklahoma State 35–0)
- (11:15) MCN – D'Andre Hicks 15-yard pass from Cody Orgeron, Noah Anderson kick (Drive: 7 plays, 82 yards, 3:33; Oklahoma State 35–7)
- (9:15) OKST – C. J. Moore 59-yard pass from Dru Brown, Matt Ammendola kick (Drive: 7 plays, 75 yards, 2:00; Oklahoma State 42–7)
- (6:52) OKST – Braydon Johnson 69-yard pass from Dru Brown, Matt Ammendola kick (Drive: 2 plays, 72 yards, 0:34; Oklahoma State 49–7)
- (6:04) OKST – Micah Cooper 1-yard run, Matt Ammendola kick (Drive: 1 plays, 1 yards, 0:03; Oklahoma State 56–7)

Fourth Quarter

- (5:39) MCN – Marcus Foster 32-yard fumble return, Noah Anderson kick (Drive: 5 plays, 26 yards, 2:13; Oklahoma State 56–14)

Statistics	MCN	OKST
First downs	13	25
Total yards	318	580
Rushes/yards	47–161	44–167
Passing yards	157	413
Passing: Comp–Att–Int	12–25–2	23–32–0
Time of possession	31:45	28:15

Team	Category	Player	Statistics
McNeese State	Passing	Cody Orgeron	11/22, 151 yards, TD, 2 INT
McNeese State	Rushing	Cody Orgeron	16 carries, 89 yards
McNeese State	Receiving	D'Andre Hicks	3 receptions, 69 yards, TD
Oklahoma State	Passing	Spencer Sanders	12/18, 250 yards, 3 TD
Oklahoma State	Rushing	Spencer Sanders	12 carries, 51 yards
Oklahoma State	Receiving	Tylan Wallace	5 receptions, 180 yards, 3 TD

=== at Tulsa ===
Oklahoma State Cowboys (2–0) vs. Tulsa Golden Hurricane (1–1)

Quarter	1	2	3	4	Total
Oklahoma State	17	3	13	7	40
Tulsa	7	14	0	0	21

at H.A. Chapman Stadium • Tulsa, Oklahoma

- Date: September 14, 2019
- Game time: 2:35 p.m. CDT
- Game weather: Temperature:91 • Wind:S 9(MPH) • Weather: party cloudy
- Game attendance: 28,612
- Referee: Eddy Shelton
- TV announcers (ESPN2): Beth Mowins (play-by-play), Anthony Becht (analyst) & Rocky Boiman (sideline)

Game information

First Quarter

- (14:50) OKST – Chuba Hubbard 75-yard run, Matt Ammendola kick (Drive: 1 plays, 75 yards, 0:10; Oklahoma State 7–0)
- (11:23) OKST – Chuba Hubbard 30-yard run, Matt Ammendola kick (Drive: 6 plays, 59 yards, 2:11; Oklahoma State 14–0)
- (6:00) OKST – Matt Ammendola 37-yard field goal (Drive: 12 plays, 75 yards, 3:25; Oklahoma State 17–0)
- (4:23) TLSA – Keylon Stokes 39-yard pass from Zach Smith, Jacob Rainey kick (Drive: 6 plays, 75 yards, 1:37; Oklahoma State 17–7)

Second Quarter

- (11:50) OKST – Matt Ammendola 36-yard field goal (Drive: 4 plays, 23 yards, 1:31; Oklahoma State 20–7)
- (9:57) TLSA – Shamari Brooks 3-yard run, Jacob Rainey kick (Drive: 7 plays, 75 yards, 1:53; Oklahoma State 20–14)
- (2:29) TLSA – Shamari Brooks 1-yard run, Jacob Rainey kick (Drive: 16 plays, 84 yards, 6:08; Tulsa 21–20)

Third Quarter

- (4:35) OKST – Spencer Sanders 27-yard run, Matt Ammendola kick (Drive: 7 plays, 52 yards, 2:17; Oklahoma State 27–21)
- (1:29) OKST – Tylan Wallace 90-yard pass from Spencer Sanders (Drive: 1 plays, 90 yards, 0:12; Oklahoma State 33–21)

Fourth Quarter

- (2:34) OKST – Chuba Hubbard 33-yard run, Matt Ammendola kick (Drive: 7 plays, 65 yards, 2:16; Oklahoma State 40–21)

Statistics	OKST	TULS
First downs	21	22
Total yards	506	396
Rushes/yards	46–337	53–158
Passing yards	169	238
Passing: Comp–Att–Int	12–22–1	19–35–0
Time of possession	25:38	34:22

Team	Category	Player	Statistics
Oklahoma State	Passing	Spencer Sanders	12/22, 169 yards, TD, INT
Oklahoma State	Rushing	Chuba Hubbard	32 carries, 256 yards, 3 TD
Oklahoma State	Receiving	Tylan Wallace	5 receptions, 118 yards, TD
Tulsa	Passing	Zach Smith	17/30, 228 yards, TD
Tulsa	Rushing	Shamari Brooks	29 carries, 107 yards, 2 TD
Tulsa	Receiving	Keylon Stokes	7 receptions, 109 yards, TD

=== at Texas ===
Oklahoma State Cowboys (3–0) vs. #12 Texas Longhorns (3–0)

Quarter	1	2	3	4	Total
Oklahoma State	3	17	3	7	30
No. 12 Texas	0	21	7	8	36

at Darrell K Royal–Texas Memorial Stadium • Austin, Texas

- Date: September 21, 2019
- Game time: 6:44 p.m. CDT
- Game weather: Temperature: 92 • Wind:SE 15-20 (MPH) • Weather: partly cloudy
- Referee: David Alvarez
- TV announcers (ABC): Chris Fowler (play-by-play), Kirk Herbstreit (analyst) & Maria Taylor (sideline)

Game information

First Quarter

- (9:12) OKST – Matt Ammendola 20-yard field goal (Drive: 13 plays, 76 yards, 5:48; Oklahoma State 3–0)

Second Quarter

- (14:53) TEX – Devin Duvernay 6-yard pass from Sam Ehlinger, Cameron Dicker kick (Drive: 9 plays, 66 yards, 3:46; Texas 7–3)
- (12:42) TEX – Jake Smith 17-yard pass from Sam Ehlinger, Cameron Dicker kick (Drive: 3 plays, 28 yards, 1:23; Texas 14–3)
- (9:21) OKST – Matt Ammendola 43-yard field goal (Drive: 8 plays, 49 yards, 3:21; Texas 14–6)
- (3:07) OKST – Spencer Sanders 7-yard run, Matt Ammendola kick (Drive: 6 plays, 70 yards, 2:17; Texas 14–13)
- (2:09) TEX – Brennan Eagles 73-yard pass from Sam Ehlinger, Cameron Dicker kick (Drive: 4 plays, 84 yards, 0:58; Texas 21–13)
- (0:11) OKST – Chuba Hubbard 1-yard run, Matt Ammendola kick (Drive: 4 plays, 15 yards, 0:34; Texas 21–20)

Third Quarter

- (8:02) OKST – Matt Ammendola 27-yard field goal (Drive: 11 plays, 74 yards, 3:44; Oklahoma State 23–21)
- (5:30) TEX – Cade Brewer 25-yard pass from Sam Ehlinger, Cameron Dicker kick (Drive: 7 plays, 75 yards, 2:32; Texas 28–23)

Fourth Quarter

- (11:44) TEX – Roschon Johnson 2-yard run, Sam Ehlinger two-point pass to Roschon Johnson (Drive: 6 plays, 73 yards, 2:19; Texas 36–23)
- (1:37) OKST – Chuba Hubbard 2-yard run, Matt Ammendola kick (Drive: 7 plays, 46 yards, 2:07; Texas 36–30)

Statistics	OKST	TEX
First downs	26	26
Total yards	494	498
Rushes/yards	56–226	43–217
Passing yards	268	281
Passing: Comp–Att–Int	19–33–2	20–28–1
Time of possession	29:19	30:41

Team	Category	Player	Statistics
Oklahoma State	Passing	Spencer Sanders	19/32, 268 yards, 2 INT
Oklahoma State	Rushing	Chuba Hubbard	37 carries, 121 yards, 2 TD
Oklahoma State	Receiving	Tylan Wallace	5 receptions, 83 yards
Texas	Passing	Sam Ehlinger	20/28, 281 yards, 4 TD, INT
Texas	Rushing	Keaontay Ingram	21 carries, 114 yards
Texas	Receiving	Devin Duvernay	12 receptions, 108 yards, TD

=== Vs. Kansas State ===
#24 Kansas State Wildcats (3–0) vs. Oklahoma State Cowboys (3–1)

Quarter	1	2	3	4	Total
No. 24 Kansas State	0	3	0	10	13
Oklahoma State	10	6	7	3	26

at Boone Pickens Stadium • Stillwater, Oklahoma

- Date: September 28, 2019
- Game time: 6:00 p.m. CDT
- Game weather: Temperature:84 • Wind:SW 8 (MPH) • Weather: Sunny
- Game attendance: 55,509
- Referee: Scott Campbell
- TV announcers (ESPN+): Mark Neely (play-by-play), Ray Bentley (analyst) & Ed Aschoff (sideline)

Game information

First Quarter

- (6:12) OKST – Matt Ammendola 25-yard field goal (Drive: 7 plays, 51 yards, 2:18; Oklahoma State 3–0)
- (3:57) OKST – Logan Carter 3-yard pass from Spencer Sanders, Matt Ammendola kick (Drive: 5 plays, 26 yards, 1:25; Oklahoma State 10–0)

Second Quarter

- (8:40) OKST – Matt Ammendola 21-yard field goal (Drive: 8 plays, 61 yards, 3:25; Oklahoma State 13–0)
- (5:35) KSU – Blake Lynch 46-yard field goal (Drive: 6 plays, 47 yards, 3:05; Oklahoma State 13–3)
- (2:06) OKST – Matt Ammendola 29-yard field goal (Drive: 8 plays, 58 yards, 3:29; Oklahoma State 16–3)

Third Quarter

- (12:45) OKST – Chuba Hubbard 84-yard run, Matt Ammendola kick (Drive: 1 plays, 84 yards, 0:13; Oklahoma State 23–3)

Fourth Quarter

- (12:16) KSU – Blake Lynch 37-yard field goal (Drive: 11 plays, 61 yards, 4:55; Oklahoma State 23–6)
- (7:14) KSU – James Gilbert 5-yard run, Blake Lynch kick (Drive: 6 plays, 49 yards, 3:07; Oklahoma State 23–13)
- (1:03) OKST – Matt Ammendola 18-yard field goal (Drive: 10 plays, 74 yards, 6:11; Oklahoma State 26–13)

Statistics	KSU	OKST
First downs	8	21
Total yards	244	526
Rushes/yards	32–126	44–373
Passing yards	118	153
Passing: Comp–Att–Int	11–23–0	16–25–2
Time of possession	29:08	30:52

Team	Category	Player	Statistics
Kansas State	Passing	Skylar Thompson	11/23, 118 yards
Kansas State	Rushing	James Gilbert	12 carries, 44 yards, TD
Kansas State	Receiving	Sammy Wheeler	1 reception, 39 yards
Oklahoma State	Passing	Spencer Sanders	16/25, 153 yards, TD, 2 INT
Oklahoma State	Rushing	Chuba Hubbard	25 carries, 296 yards, TD
Oklahoma State	Receiving	Tylan Wallace	8 receptions, 145 yards

Oklahoma State's Chuba Hubbard ran for 296 yards, averaging 11.8 per attempt in a leading effort to hand Kansas State their first loss of the season. Coming into the game, Kansas State was #7 in team rushing and averaged 280 yards Oklahoma State's defense contributed well to the win as they held Kansas State to just 126 rushing yards, with only 18 of those yards in the first half.

Kansas State worked on a fourth-quarter comeback, but Oklahoma State was able to control the clock and win the game 26-13.

=== at Texas Tech ===
#21 Oklahoma State Cowboys (4–1) vs. Texas Tech Red Raiders (2–2)

Quarter	1	2	3	4	Total
No. 21 Oklahoma State	0	7	14	14	35
Texas Tech	13	7	14	11	45

at Jones AT&T Stadium • Lubbock, Texas

- Date: October 5, 2019
- Game time: 11:00 a.m. CDT
- Game weather: Temperature: 75 • Wind:WSW13 (MPH) • Weather:Clear
- Game attendance: 56,479
- Referee: Cooper Castleberry
- TV announcers (FS1): Brian Custer (play-by-play) & Robert Smith (analyst)

Game information

First Quarter

- (12:49) TTU – Trey Wolff 38-yard field goal (Drive: 4 plays, 5 yards, 1:06; Texas Tech 3–0)
- (5:01) TTU – Jett Duffey 16-yard run, Trey Wolff kick (Drive: 6 plays, 83 yards, 1:33; Texas Tech 10–0)
- (1:03) TTU – Trey Wolff 27-yard field goal (Drive: 6 plays, 31 yards, 2:23; Texas Tech 13–0)

Second Quarter

- (10:21) TTU – KeSean Carter 14-yard pass from Jett Duffey, Trey Wolff kick (Drive: 2 plays, 37 yards, 0:27; Texas Tech 20–0)
- (0:30) OKST – Chuba Hubbard 3-yard run, Matt Ammendola kick (Drive: 5 plays, 46 yards, 1:25; Texas Tech 20–7)

Third Quarter

- (13:02) TTU – T. J. Vasher 21-yard pass from Jett Duffey, Trey Wolff kick (Drive: 7 plays, 75 yards, 1:58; Texas Tech 27–7)
- (12:00) OKST – Jordan McCray 73-yard pass from Spencer Sanders, Matt Ammendola kick (Drive: 3 plays, 75 yards, 1:02; Texas Tech 27–14)
- (5:48) TTU – Dalton Rigdon 8-yard pass from Jett Duffey, Trey Wolff kick (Drive: 6 plays, 59 yards, 2:21; Texas Tech 34–14)
- (2:48) OKST – Chuba Hubbard 3-yard run, Matt Ammendola kick (Drive: 8 plays, 75 yards, 3:00; Texas Tech 34–21)

Fourth Quarter

- (13:53) TTU – Trey Wolff 26-yard field goal (Drive: 7 plays, 61 yards, 1:12; Texas Tech 37–21)
- (8:26) TTU – Erik Ezukanma 56-yard pass from Jett Duffey, Jett Duffey two-point pass to T. J. Vasher kick (Drive: 6 plays, 94 yards, 3:24; Texas Tech 45–21)
- (5:16) OKST – Chuba Hubbard 7-yard run, Chuba Hubbard two-point run (Drive: 10 plays, 58 yards, 3:10; Texas Tech 45–29)
- (3:27) OKST – Tylan Wallace 10-yard pass from Spencer Sanders (Drive: 6 plays, 35 yards, 1:49; Texas Tech 45–35)

Statistics	OKST	TTU
First downs	26	29
Total yards	509	586
Rushes/yards	56–219	35–162
Passing yards	290	424
Passing: Comp–Att–Int	22–37–3	26–44–0
Time of possession	31:56	28:04

Team	Category	Player	Statistics
Oklahoma State	Passing	Spencer Sanders	22/37, 290 yards, 2 TD, 3 INT
Oklahoma State	Rushing	Chuba Hubbard	34 carries, 156 yards, 3 TD
Oklahoma State	Receiving	Tylan Wallace	11 receptions, 85 yards, TD
Texas Tech	Passing	Jett Duffey	26/44, 424 yards, 4 TD
Texas Tech	Rushing	SaRodorick Thompson	12 carries, 69 yards
Texas Tech	Receiving	T. J. Vasher	5 receptions, 110 yards, TD

=== Vs. Baylor ===
#18 Baylor Bears (6–0) vs. Oklahoma State Cowboys (4–2)

Quarter	1	2	3	4	Total
No. 18 Baylor	7	3	14	21	45
Oklahoma State	6	7	7	7	27

at Boone Pickens Stadium• Stillwater, Oklahoma

- Date: October 19, 2019
- Game time: 3:00 p.m. CDT
- Game weather: Temperature: 73 • Wind:N 14 (MPH) • Weather: Sunny
- Game attendance: 55,060
- Referee: Reggie Smith
- TV announcers (FOX): Tim Brando (play-by-play), Spencer Tillman (analyst) & Coley Harvey (sideline)

Game information

First Quarter

- (12:06) BAY – John Lovett 25-yard run, John Mayers kick (Drive: 3 plays, 62 yards, 1:08; Baylor 7–0)
- (6:37) OKST – Jordan McCray 5-yard pass from Spencer Sanders (Drive: 13 plays, 78 yards, 5:30; Baylor 7–6)

Second Quarter

- (4:15) OKST – Chuba Hubbard 2-yard run, Matt Ammendola kick (Drive: 7 plays, 46 yards, 2:25; Oklahoma State 13–7)
- (1:32) BAY – John Mayers 28-yard field goal (Drive: 7 plays, 64 yards, 2:43; Oklahoma State 13–10)

Third Quarter

- (9:35) OKST – Chuba Hubbard 3-yard run, Matt Ammendola kick (Drive: 8 plays, 45 yards, 3:25; Oklahoma State 20–10)
- (8:42) BAY – JaMycal Hasty 5-yard run, John Mayers kick (Drive: 2 plays, 83 yards, 0:53; Oklahoma State 20–17)
- (2:36) BAY – Josh Fleeks 64-yard pass from Charlie Brewer, John Mayers kick (Drive: 6 plays, 93 yards, 2:55; Baylor 24–20)

Fourth Quarter

- (12:55) OKST – LD Brown 68-yard run, Matt Ammendola kick (Drive: 5 plays, 93 yards, 1:53; Oklahoma State 27–24)
- (9:04) BAY – Charlie Brewer 2-yard run, John Mayers kick (Drive: 7 plays, 75 yards, 3:51; Baylor 31–27)
- (8:00) BAY – Terrel Bernard 20-yard fumble return, John Mayers kick (Drive: 3 plays, -1 yards, 1:04; Baylor 38–27)
- (5:13) BAY – JaMycal Hasty 73-yard run, John Mayers kick (Drive: 1 plays, 73 yards, 0:12; Baylor 45–27)

Statistics	BAY	OKST
First downs	18	27
Total yards	536	469
Rushes/yards	37–224	50–281
Passing yards	312	188
Passing: Comp–Att–Int	13–17–0	22–36–1
Time of possession	28:12	31:48

Team	Category	Player	Statistics
Baylor	Passing	Charlie Brewer	13/17, 312 yards, TD
Baylor	Rushing	JaMycal Hasty	16 carries, 146 yards, 2 TD
Baylor	Receiving	Josh Fleeks	3 receptions, 126 yards, TD
Oklahoma State	Passing	Spencer Sanders	18/32, 157 yards, TD, INT
Oklahoma State	Rushing	Chuba Hubbard	32 carries, 171 yards, 2 TD
Oklahoma State	Receiving	Tylan Wallace	6 receptions, 69 yards

=== at Iowa State ===
Oklahoma State Cowboys (4–3) vs. #23 Iowa State Cyclones (5–2)

Quarter	1	2	3	4	Total
Oklahoma State	7	14	3	10	34
No. 23 Iowa State	0	13	7	7	27

at Jack Trice Stadium • Ames, Iowa

- Date: October 26, 2019
- Game time: 2:30 p.m. CDT
- Game weather: Temperature: 51 • Wind:S 5(MPH) • Weather: partly cloudy
- Game attendance: 61,500
- Referee: David Alvarez
- TV announcers (FS1): Cory Provous (play-by-play), Petros Papadakis (analyst) & Shane Vereen (analyst)

Game information

First Quarter

- (6:26) OKST – Tylan Wallace 71-yard pass from Spencer Sanders, Matt Ammendola kick (Drive: 4 plays, 90 yards, 1:59; Oklahoma State 7–0)

Second Quarter

- (14:19) ISU – Charlie Kolar 18-yard pass from Brock Purdy, Connor Assalley kick (Drive: 7 plays, 83 yards, 3:21; Tied 7–7)
- (12:36) OKST – Braydon Johnson 50-yard pass from Spencer Sanders, Matt Ammendola kick (Drive: 4 plays, 82 yards, 1:36; Oklahoma State 14–7)
- (7:31) ISU – Connor Assalley 32-yard field goal (Drive: 12 plays, 60 yards, 5:05; Oklahoma State 14–10)
- (6:04) OKST – Chuba Hubbard 65-yard run, Matt Ammendola kick (Drive: 4 plays, 89 yards, 1:23; Oklahoma State 21–10)
- (0:04) ISU – Connor Assalley 29-yard field goal (Drive: 11 plays, 60 yards, 1:30; Oklahoma State 21–13)

Third Quarter

- (10:18) ISU – Breece Hall 9-yard run, Connor Assalley kick (Drive: 2 plays, 31 yards, 0:46; Oklahoma State 21–20)
- (5:46) OKST – Matt Ammendola 49-yard field goal (Drive: 8 plays, 36 yards, 4:26; Oklahoma State 24–20)

Fourth Quarter

- (14:56) OKST – Matt Ammendola 40-yard field goal (Drive: 8 plays, 58 yards, 4:02; Oklahoma State 27–20)
- (9:06) ISU – Breece Hall 4-yard run, Connor Assalley kick (Drive: 11 plays, 76 yards, 5:45; Tied 27–27)
- (6:47) OKST – Malcolm Rodriguez 26-yard interception return, Matt Ammendola kick (Drive: 3 plays, 6 yards, 0:45; Oklahoma State 34–27)

Statistics	OKST	ISU
First downs	14	30
Total yards	402	468
Rushes/yards	31–153	25–86
Passing yards	249	382
Passing: Comp–Att–Int	16–24–1	39–63–3
Time of possession	25:41	34:19

Team	Category	Player	Statistics
Oklahoma State	Passing	Spencer Sanders	16/24, 249 yards, 2 TD, INT
Oklahoma State	Rushing	Chuba Hubbard	22 carries, 116 yards, TD
Oklahoma State	Receiving	Tylan Wallace	8 receptions, 131 yards, TD
Iowa State	Passing	Brock Purdy	39/62, 382 yards, TD, 3 INT
Iowa State	Rushing	Breece Hall	18 carries, 76 yards, 2 TD
Iowa State	Receiving	Deshaunte Jones	8 receptions, 91 yards

=== Vs. TCU ===
TCU Horned Frogs (4–3) vs. Oklahoma State Cowboys (5–3)

Quarter	1	2	3	4	Total
TCU	3	14	0	10	27
Oklahoma State	10	7	7	10	34

at Boone Pickens Stadium • Stillwater, Oklahoma

- Date: November 2, 2019
- Game time: 2:30 p.m. CDT
- Game weather: Temperature:57 • Wind:WNW 4 (MPH) • Weather: clear and sunny
- Game attendance: 52,861
- Referee: Brad Van Vark
- TV announcers (ESPN): Mark Jones (play-by-play), Dusty Dvoracek (analyst) & Olivia Dekker (sideline)

Game information

First Quarter

- (11:00) OKST – Matt Ammendola 26-yard field goal (Drive: 10 plays, 67 yards, 4:00; Oklahoma State 3–0)
- (9:01) OKST – Dillon Stoner 57-yard pass from Spencer Sanders, Matt Ammendola kick (Drive: 2 plays, 60 yards, 0:47; Oklahoma State 10–0)
- (1:01) TCU – Jonathan Song 40-yard field goal (Drive: 5 plays, 26 yards, 2:02; Oklahoma State 10–3)

Second Quarter

- (13:10) OKST – Dillon Stoner 22-yard pass from Spencer Sanders, Matt Ammendola kick (Drive: 6 plays, 80 yards, 2:51; Oklahoma State 17–3)
- (7:24) TCU – Max Duggan 6-yard run, Jonathan Song kick (Drive: 12 plays, 81 yards, 5:46; Oklahoma State 17–10)
- (0:39) TCU – Pro Wells 24-yard pass from Max Duggan, Jonathan Song kick (Drive: 9 plays, 95 yards, 3:54; Tied 17–17)

Third Quarter

- (7:42) OKST – Chuba Hubbard 92-yard run, Matt Ammendola kick (Drive: 1 plays, 92 yards, 0:13; Oklahoma State 24–17)

Fourth Quarter

- (9:48) OKST – Chuba Hubbard 62-yard run, Matt Ammendola kick (Drive: 2 plays, 68 yards, 0:47; Oklahoma State 31–17)
- (7:11) TCU – Sewo Olonilua 1-yard run, Jonathan Song kick (Drive: 9 plays, 75 yards, 2:37; Oklahoma State 31–24)
- (2:04) OKST – Matt Ammendola 43-yard field goal (Drive: 7 plays, 23 yards, 2:11; Oklahoma State 34–24)
- (0:22) TCU – Jonathan Song 40-yard field goal (Drive: 12 plays, 52 yards, 1:42; Oklahoma State 34–27)

Statistics	TCU	OKST
First downs	22	16
Total yards	450	459
Rushes/yards	39–161	41–301
Passing yards	287	158
Passing: Comp–Att–Int	23–43–3	9–15–1
Time of possession	32:58	27:02

Team	Category	Player	Statistics
TCU	Passing	Max Duggan	21/39, 258 yards, TD, 3 INT
TCU	Rushing	Max Duggan	16 carries, 86 yards, TD
TCU	Receiving	Jalen Reagor	7 receptions, 126 yards
Oklahoma State	Passing	Spencer Sanders	9/15, 158 yards, 2 TD, INT
Oklahoma State	Rushing	Chuba Hubbard	20 carries, 223 yards, 2 TD
Oklahoma State	Receiving	Dillon Stoner	3 receptions, 93 yards, 2 TD

Chuba Hubbard ran for a total of 223 yards, including two long second-half touchdowns in the victory.

=== Vs. Kansas ===
Kansas Jayhawks (3–6) vs. #22 Oklahoma State Cowboys (6–3)

Quarter	1	2	3	4	Total
Kansas	0	0	0	13	13
No. 22 Oklahoma State	14	10	7	0	31

at Boone Pickens Stadium • Stillwater, Oklahoma

- Date: November 16, 2019
- Game time: 11:03 a.m. CST
- Game weather: Temperature: 54 • Wind:S 13(MPH) • Weather: Sunny; partly cloudy
- Game attendance: 55,388
- Referee: Brandon Cruse
- TV announcers (FS1): Dan Hellie (play-by-play) & Ben Leber (analyst)

Game information

First Quarter

- (11:56) OKST – Chuba Hubbard 15-yard run, Matt Ammendola kick (Drive: 4 plays, 65 yards, 1:50; Oklahoma State 7–0)
- (0:03) OKST – Chuba Hubbard 4-yard run, Matt Ammendola kick (Drive: 12 plays, 75 yards, 5:44; Oklahoma State 14–0)

Second Quarter

- (5:13) OKST – Dillon Stoner 51-yard pass from Spencer Sanders, Matt Ammendola kick (Drive: 2 plays, 55 yards, 0:33; Oklahoma State 21–0)
- (0:53) OKST – Matt Ammendola 44-yard field goal (Drive: 7 plays, 20 yards, 1:49; Oklahoma State 24–0)

Third Quarter

- (3:37) OKST – Dillon Stoner 43-yard pass from Dru Brown, Matt Ammendola kick (Drive: 6 plays, 74 yards, 3:10; Oklahoma State 31–0)

Fourth Quarter

- (8:22) KU – Stephon Robinson Jr. 14-yard pass from Carter Stanley (Drive: 13 plays, 80 yards, 5:47; Oklahoma State 31–6)
- (1:09) KU – Quan Hampton 9-yard pass from Carter Stanley, Liam Jones kick (Drive: 11 plays, 78 yards, 2:15; Oklahoma State 31–13)

Statistics	KU	OKST
First downs	18	23
Total yards	290	447
Rushes/yards	24–39	45–209
Passing yards	251	238
Passing: Comp–Att–Int	26–46–3	15–25–0
Time of possession	28:28	31:32

Team	Category	Player	Statistics
Kansas	Passing	Carter Stanley	22/37, 226 yards, 2 TD, INT
Kansas	Rushing	Pooka Williams Jr.	12 carries, 26 yards
Kansas	Receiving	Stephon Robinson Jr.	6 receptions, 68 yards, TD
Oklahoma State	Passing	Spencer Sanders	12/18, 168 yards, TD
Oklahoma State	Rushing	Chuba Hubbard	23 carries, 122 yards, 2 TD
Oklahoma State	Receiving	Dillon Stoner	5 receptions, 150 yards, 2 TD

=== at West Virginia ===
#21 Oklahoma State Cowboys (7–3) vs. West Virginia Mountaineers (4–6)

Quarter	1	2	3	4	Total
No. 21 Oklahoma State	7	0	3	10	20
West Virginia	0	10	3	0	13

at Mountaineer Field • Morgantown, West Virginia

- Date: November 23, 2019
- Game time: 11:00 a.m. CST
- Game weather: Temperature:37 • Wind:N4 (MPH) • Weather: overcast
- Game attendance: 46,022
- Referee: Cooper Castleberry
- TV announcers (ESPN2): Beth Mowins (play-by-play), Anthony Becht (analyst) & Rocky Boiman (field analyst)

Game information

First Quarter

- (7:41) OKST – Jelani Woods 1-yard pass from Dru Brown, Matt Ammendola kick (Drive: 11 plays, 91 yards, 3:30; Oklahoma State 7–0)

Second Quarter

- (10:33) WVU – Evan Staley 22-yard field goal (Drive: 11 plays, 91 yards, 3:30; Oklahoma State 7–3)
- (5:23) WVU – George Campbell 34-yard pass from Jarret Doege, Evan Staley kick (Drive: 11 plays, 91 yards, 3:30; West Virginia 10–7)

Third Quarter

- (10:52) OKST – Matt Ammendola 44-yard field goal (Drive: 11 plays, 91 yards, 3:30; Tied 10–10)
- (0:54) WVU – Evan Staley 29-yard field goal (Drive: 11 plays, 91 yards, 3:30; West Virginia 13–10)

Fourth Quarter

- (11:23) OKST – Dillon Stoner 2-yard pass from Dru Brown, Matt Ammendola kick (Drive: 11 plays, 91 yards, 3:30; Oklahoma State 17–13)
- (6:18) OKST – Matt Ammendola 22-yard field goal (Drive: 11 plays, 91 yards, 3:30; Oklahoma State 20–13)

Statistics	OKST	WVU
First downs	18	18
Total yards	285	333
Rushes/yards	37–89	22–26
Passing yards	196	307
Passing: Comp–Att–Int	22–29–0	28–38–0
Time of possession	30:48	29:12

Team	Category	Player	Statistics
Oklahoma State	Passing	Dru Brown	22/29, 196 yards, 2 TD
Oklahoma State	Rushing	Chuba Hubbard	26 carries, 106 yards
Oklahoma State	Receiving	Chuba Hubbard	7 receptions, 88 yards
West Virginia	Passing	Jarret Doege	28/38, 308 yards, TD
West Virginia	Rushing	Leddie Brown	13 carries, 31 yards
West Virginia	Receiving	George Campbell	5 receptions, 92 yards, TD

=== Vs. Oklahoma ===
#7 Oklahoma Sooners (10–1) vs. #21 Oklahoma State Cowboys (8–3)

Quarter	1	2	3	4	Total
No.7 Oklahoma	10	10	7	7	34
No. 21 Oklahoma State	7	6	3	0	16

at Boone Pickens Stadium • Stillwater, Oklahoma

- Date: November 30, 2019
- Game time: 7:05 p.m. CST
- Game weather: Temperature:50 • Wind:WNW 7 (MPH) • Weather:Clear
- Game attendance: 54,575
- Referee: Reggie Smith
- TV announcers (FOX): Joe Davis (play-by-play), Brock Huard (analyst) & Bruce Feldman (sideline)

Game information

First Quarter

- (13:14) OKLA – Jalen Hurts 28-yard run, Gabe Brkic kick (Drive: 4 plays, 78 yards, 1:46; Oklahoma 7–0)
- (9:02) OKST – Chuba Hubbard 3-yard run, Matt Ammendola kick (Drive: 8 plays, 76 yards, 4:12; Tied 7–7)
- (3:00) OKLA – Gabe Brkic 42-yard field goal (Drive: 12 plays, 49 yards, 6:02; Oklahoma 10–7)

Second Quarter

- (14:54) OKLA – Jalen Hurts 4-yard pass from Nick Basquine, Gabe Brkic kick (Drive: 5 plays, 56 yards, 1:51; Oklahoma 17–7)
- (9:40) OKST – Matt Ammendola 43-yard field goal (Drive: 13 plays, 49 yards, 5:14; Oklahoma 17–10)
- (5:06) OKLA – Gabe Brkic 27-yard field goal (Drive: 9 plays, 65 yards, 4:34; Oklahoma 20–10)
- (0:00) OKST – Matt Ammendola 25-yard field goal (Drive: 13 plays, 77 yards, 5:06; Oklahoma 20–13)

Third Quarter

- (9:41) OKST – Matt Ammendola 26-yard field goal (Drive: 6 plays, 49 yards, 2:16; Oklahoma 20–16)
- (3:22) OKLA – Kennedy Brooks 3-yard run, Gabe Brkic kick (Drive: 11 plays, 93 yards, 6:19; Oklahoma 27–16)

Fourth Quarter

- (10:21) OKLA – Brayden Willis 3-yard pass from Jalen Hurts, Gabe Brkic kick (Drive: 11 plays, 73 yards, 5:45; Oklahoma 34–16)

Statistics	OKLA	OKST
First downs	22	20
Total yards	450	335
Rushes/yards	44–283	29–128
Passing yards	167	207
Passing: Comp–Att–Int	14–17–0	22–32–1
Time of possession	34:03	25:57

Team	Category	Player	Statistics
Oklahoma	Passing	Jalen Hurts	13/16, 163 yards, TD
Oklahoma	Rushing	Kennedy Brooks	22 carries, 160 yards, TD
Oklahoma	Receiving	CeeDee Lamb	4 receptions, 36 yards
Oklahoma State	Passing	Dru Brown	22/32, 207 yards, INT
Oklahoma State	Rushing	Chuba Hubbard	24 carries, 104 yards, TD
Oklahoma State	Receiving	Braydon Johnson	4 receptions, 77 yards

=== Vs. Texas A&M (Texas Bowl) ===
Texas A&M Aggies (7–5) vs. #25 Oklahoma State Cowboys (8–4)

Quarter	1	2	3	4	Total
No. 25 Oklahoma State	14	0	0	7	21
Texas A&M	0	7	7	10	24

at NRG Stadium • Houston, Texas

- Date: December 27
- Game time: 5:45 p.m. CST
- Game weather: n/a (retractable roof closed)
- Game attendance: 68,415
- Referee: Mark Kluczynski
- TV announcers (ESPN): Kevin Brown (play-by-play), Andre Ware (analyst), Alyssa Lang (sideline)

Game information

First Quarter

- (7:47) OKST – Braydon Johnson 42-yard pass from Dru Brown, Matt Ammendola kick (Drive: 5 plays, 97 yards, 1:57; Oklahoma State 7–0)
- (1:33) OKST – Dru Brown 9-yard rush, Matt Ammendola kick (Drive: 4 plays, 82 yards, 1:48; Oklahoma State 14–0)

Second Quarter

- (5:39) TAMU – Isaiah Spiller 1-yard rush, Seth Small kick (Drive: 6 plays, 22 yards, 2:24; Oklahoma State 14–7)

Third Quarter

- (10:32) TAMU – Jhamon Ausbon 10-yard pass from Kellen Mond, Seth Small kick (Drive: 7 plays, 60 yards, 3:32; Tied 14–14)

Fourth Quarter

- (10:45) TAMU – Kellen Mond 67-yard rush, Seth Small kick (Drive: 3 plays, 88 yards, 1:28; Texas A&M 21–14)
- (2:52) TAMU – Seth Small 24-yard field goal (Drive: 9 plays, 59 yards, 5:08; Texas A&M 24–14)
- (1:04) OKST – Braydon Johnson 5-yard pass from Dru Brown, Seth Small kick (Drive: 8 plays, 59 yards, 1:48; Texas A&M 24–21)

Statistics	OKST	TAMU
First downs	17	19
Total yards	334	343
Rushes/yards	31–150	41–248
Passing yards	184	95
Passing: Comp–Att–Int	15–28–0	13–19–0
Time of possession	25:47	34:13

Team	Category	Player	Statistics
Oklahoma State	Passing	Dru Brown	15/28, 184 yards, 2 TD, INT
Oklahoma State	Rushing	Chuba Hubbard	19 carries, 158 yards
Oklahoma State	Receiving	Braydon Johnson	5 receptions, 124 yards, 2 TD
Texas A&M	Passing	Kellen Mond	13/19, 95 yards, TD
Texas A&M	Rushing	Kellen Mond	12 carries, 117 yards, TD
Texas A&M	Receiving	Quartney Davis	6 receptions, 48 yards

== Statistics ==
=== Scoring ===
Scores against non-conference opponents

	1	2	3	4	Total
Opponents	10	6	14	13	43
Oklahoma State	38	41	55	14	148

Scores against the Big 12

	1	2	3	4	Total
Opponents					0
Oklahoma State					0

Scores against all opponents

	1	2	3	4	Total
Opponents					0
Oklahoma State					0

== Rankings ==
Ranking movements Legend: ██ Increase in ranking ██ Decrease in ranking — = Not ranked RV = Received votes
	Week																
Poll	Pre	1	2	3	4	5	6	7	8	9	10	11	12	13	14	15	Final
AP	RV	RV	RV	RV	RV	21	—	—	—	RV	RV	25	22	21	RV	25	—
Coaches	RV	RV	RV	RV	RV	25	—	—	—	RV	RV	RV	23	21	RV	RV	RV
CFP	Not released										23	22	21	21	25	25	Not released
