= Gundy (surname) =

Gundy is an English surname. Notable people with the surname include:

- Cale Gundy (born 1972), American former college football quarterback at the University of Oklahoma, brother of Mike
- James Henry Gundy (1880–1951), Canadian businessman
- Mike Gundy (born 1967), American football coach and former player at Oklahoma State University, brother of Cale

== See also ==
- Van Gundy, a surname
