= Van Gundy =

Van Gundy is a Dutch surname. Notable people with the surname include:

- Arthur B. VanGundy, former professor for communication, book author and expert on creative problem-solving
- Bill Van Gundy, former college basketball coach, father of Jeff and Stan
- Doug Van Gundy, American poet and musician
- Jeff Van Gundy (born 1962), former coach of the National Basketball Association's Houston Rockets and New York Knicks, brother of Stan and son of Bill
- Stan Van Gundy (born 1959), head coach and president of basketball operations of the National Basketball Association's Detroit Pistons, brother of Jeff and son of Bill

== See also ==
- Gundy (surname)
