= STEAM education =

Extension on STEM that injects the arts into the curriculum

STEAM (science, technology, engineering, art, and mathematics) education is an expanded approach to teaching science, technology, engineering, and mathematics (STEM), an interdisciplinary and integrated teaching method for those four subjects. STEAM expands on STEM education by including the arts. STEAM programs aim to teach students innovation, to think critically, and to use engineering or technology in imaginative designs or creative approaches to real-world problems while building on students' mathematics and science base.

== Program examples ==
Examples of state-based STEAM programs, guidance or related resources in the United States include:

- Ohio's Quality Model for STEM and STEAM Schools. By Ohio statute, a STEAM school is designated as a type of STEM school.
- In May 2014, Rhode Island created the STEAM Now Coalition.
- In 2017, Nevada enacted legislation for the creation of a State Seal of STEM Program and a State Seal of STEAM Program. The STEAM seal is given to students who have "high level of proficiency in science, technology, engineering, the arts and mathematics."
- In South Carolina, the South Carolina State Department of Education created the South Carolina STEAM Implementation Continuum "to provide statewide guidance and consistency with regard to STEAM implementation".
- Georgia Institute of Technology (Georgia Tech) in collaboration with its Center for Education Integrating Science, Mathematics and Computing (CEISMC) created the GoSTEAM program. GoSTEAM is a program that integrates art and music into STEM focused curriculum for students in the K–12 (kindergarten to twelfth grade studies).

== J-STEAM ==
The Journal of STEAM Education (J-STEAM) is a free and open-access journal that is peer-reviewed by an international team of reviewers. It is an online publication and is published by the STEAM Education Research Association. The journal publishes articles from a range of topics in educational research and related disciplines. As J-STEAM, it has an emphasis on the integration of STEAM topics, namely science, technology, engineering, art, and mathematics.

== STEAM in children's media ==
- Sesame Street's 43rd season continues to focus on STEM but finds ways to integrate art. They state: "This helps make learning STEM concepts relevant and enticing to young children by highlighting how artists use STEM knowledge to enhance their art or solve problems. It also provides context for the importance of STEM knowledge in careers in the arts (e.g. musician, painter, sculptor, and dancer)."
- MGA Entertainment created a S.T.E.A.M.-based franchise called Project Mc^{2}.

== Criticism of STEAM ==
STEM subjects can incorporate art to assist teaching STEM, where art is a tool for STEM in the form of STEAM education. However, some criticism holds that art and STEM subjects should be of equal value in the education process.

== Other uses of STEAM ==
- Meanings of the "A" that have been promoted include agriculture, architecture, and applied mathematics.
- The Rhode Island School of Design has a STEM to STEAM program and at one point maintained an interactive map that showed global STEAM initiatives. Relevant organizations were able to add themselves to the map, though it is no longer available at the location stated in press releases. John Maeda, (2008 to 2013 president of Rhode Island School of Design) has been a champion in bringing the initiative to the political forums of educational policy.
- Some programs offer STEAM from a base focus like mathematics and science.
- SteamHead is a non-profit organization that promotes innovation and accessibility in education, focusing on STEAM fields.
- As part of a $1.5 million Department of Education grant, Wolf Trap's Institute of Education trains and places teaching artists in preschool and kindergarten classrooms. The artists collaborate with the teachers to integrate math and science into the arts.
- Nonprofit organizations focused on closing the digital divide have adopted STEAM frameworks to connect underrepresented communities — particularly Black and Latino youth — with technology education, workforce preparation, and creative arts programs.

== See also ==
- Arts-based training
- STEM fields
