= Kasey Dunn =

American gridiron football player and coach (born 1969)

No. 80, 72
- Position: Wide receiver

Personal information
- Born: July 22, 1969 (age 57); San Diego, California, U.S.
- Listed height: 6 ft 2 in (1.88 m)
- Listed weight: 200 lb (91 kg)

Career information
- High school: North Kitsap (WA)
- College: Idaho
- NFL draft: 1992: undrafted

Career history

Playing
- Houston Oilers (1992)*; BC Lions (1992); Edmonton Eskimos (1992–1993)
- * Offseason or practice squad member only

Coaching
- Idaho (1993) Volunteer assistant; San Diego (1994) Tight ends/wide receivers coach; Idaho (1995) Cornerbacks coach; New Mexico (1996–1997) Cornerbacks coach; Washington State (1998–1999) Running backs coach; Washington State (2000–2002) Special teams coordinator/running backs coach; TCU (2003) Cornerbacks coach; Arizona (2004–2006) Running backs coach; Baylor (2007) Special teams coordinator/wide receivers coach; Seattle Seahawks (2008–2009) Running backs coach; Southern Miss (2010) Wide receivers coach; Oklahoma State (2011–2018) Wide receivers coach; Oklahoma State (2019) Associate head coach/wide receivers coach; Oklahoma State (2020–2024) Offensive coordinator/associate head coach/wide receivers coach

Career CFL statistics
- Games played: 13
- Receptions: 20

Kasey E. Dunn (born July 22, 1969) is an American football coach and former wide receiver who most recently served as the offensive coordinator at Oklahoma State University.

== Playing career ==
Dunn was a wide receiver at Idaho from 1987 to 1991. An eleventh hour commit, Idaho was the only scholarship offer Dunn received to play college football. As of 2020, he still holds program records for career receptions (287) and career receiving yards (3,847), while also being inducted into the school's Hall of Fame in 2007. He also spent time playing professional football, with the NFL's Houston Oilers in 1992, and the CFL's BC Lions and Edmonton Eskimos from 1992 to 1993, coming up with 20 receptions with Edmonton in 1992.

== Coaching career ==
At the conclusion of his playing career, Dunn spent time as a volunteer assistant at his alma mater Idaho in 1993. He was then hired as a full-time assistant at San Diego in 1994, coaching tight ends and wide receivers. He returned to Idaho in 1995 to coach their cornerbacks, before joining the coaching staff at New Mexico in 1996 as cornerbacks coach. He was hired to coach running backs at Washington State in 1998, later adding special teams coaching duties in 2000. He also had assistant coaching stints at TCU and Arizona before being hired as the special teams coordinator & wide receivers coach at Baylor in 2007. Originally hired to be the receivers coach at Maryland in 2008, he left that position to coach the running backs for the NFL's Seattle Seahawks. Dunn spent the 2010 season as the wide receivers coach at Southern Miss.

=== Oklahoma State ===
Dunn was hired as the wide receivers coach at Oklahoma State in 2011. At Oklahoma State, he was the position coach for a number of standout wide receivers, including All-American and Biletnikoff Award winner Justin Blackmon, Biletnikoff Award winner James Washington, and All-American Tylan Wallace. He added the title of associate head coach in 2019. After initially accepting the offensive coordinator position at UNLV under former Cowboys assistant and friend Marcus Arroyo, Dunn instead accepted a promotion to offensive coordinator at Oklahoma State in 2020 following the departure of Sean Gleeson, and also received a $250,000 pay raise to $800,000 a year for his promotion.

== Personal life ==
Dunn and his wife Janelle have two daughters: Kayla and Lauren. Dunn is of African-American heritage and as of 2020, the only minority football coordinator in the Big 12 Conference.
