= Sean Gleeson (American football) =

American football coach

Current position
- Title: Offensive coordinator
- Team: Kansas State
- Conference: Big 12

Biographical details
- Born: Glen Ridge, New Jersey, U.S.
- Education: Glen Ridge High School, Trinity-Pawling School, Williams College

Playing career
- 2003–2006: Williams
- Position: Quarterback

Coaching career (HC unless noted)
- 2007–2010: Delbarton School (NJ) (assistant)
- 2011–2012: Fairleigh Dickinson–Florham (OC/QB)
- 2013–2016: Princeton (RB)
- 2017–2018: Princeton (OC/QB)
- 2019: Oklahoma State (OC/QB)
- 2020–2022: Rutgers (OC/QB)
- 2023: Northwestern (Analyst)
- 2024: Missouri (Analyst)
- 2025: Missouri (QB)
- 2026–present: Kansas State (OC)

Sean Gleeson is an American football coach and former player. He is the Offensive coordinator at Kansas State University .

== Playing career ==
Gleeson grew up in Glen Ridge, New Jersey and briefly in Franklin, New Jersey before that. He played high school football for Glen Ridge High School, where he also played baseball and ice hockey. He then spent a post-graduate year at Trinity-Pawling School in Pawling, New York. Gleeson then moved on to play quarterback at Williams College in Williamstown, Massachusetts from 2003 to 2006. In 2005, he led the NESCAC in passer rating with a rating of 163.6. In 2006, while splitting time as a senior, Gleeson helped lead his team to an 8–0 record, and combined with his co-quarterback partner to throw for over 4,000 yards, all while on the path to claiming the NESCAC title.

== Coaching career ==
=== Delbarton School ===
Following Gleeson's playing days and graduation from Williams College, he spent 2007 through 2010 at Delbarton School in Morristown, New Jersey. Here, he was a coach for football, baseball, and bowling.

=== Fairleigh Dickinson-Florham ===
In 2011, Gleeson joined Brian Surace's staff at Fairleigh Dickinson-Florham as the offensive coordinator and quarterbacks coach.

=== Princeton ===
Gleeson joined Bob Surace's (brother of FDU head coach Brian Surace) coaching staff at Princeton prior to the 2013 football season. He served as the running backs coach from 2013 through 2016. When Princeton offensive coordinator James Perry left to become the head coach at Bryant, Gleeson was promoted to offensive coordinator. In addition to this promotion, Gleeson shifted from coaching the running backs, to coaching the quarterbacks.

The following was taken from Gleeson's Biography page on the Princeton Athletics website: “In his first year as the quarterbacks coach, Gleeson oversaw a historic season for Chad Kanoff, who would go on to win the Bushnell Cup as the Ivy League Offensive Player of the Year. Kanoff broke the Princeton and Ivy League records for single-season passing yards with 3,474, and he also broke the Ivy League single-season completion percentage of 73.2, breaking the mark held by former Dallas Cowboys head coach and former Princeton Bushnell Cup winner Jason Garrett.

In 2018, he coordinated an offense that set an Ivy League record with 470 points. Princeton ranked second in the FCS in scoring and third in total offense, and it scored at least 40 points in eight of 10 games. For the first time in Ivy League history, Princeton had both finalists for the Offensive Player of the Year award, and quarterback John Lovett became only the fifth multiple-time Bushnell Cup winner in Ivy history.

As a coordinator, 18 members of the 2017 and 2018 Princeton offenses earned All-Ivy League honors, including first-team honors for Kanoff, WR Jesper Horsted (twice), and OL Mitchell Sweigart. Horsted ended his career with several single-season and career receiving records, while Sweigart became Princeton's first lineman to earn multiple first-team All-Ivy honors since 2000-01.”

=== Oklahoma State ===
On January 27, 2019, Gleeson was announced as Mike Gundy's new offensive coordinator at Oklahoma State.

=== Rutgers ===
After one year at Oklahoma State University, Greg Schiano recruited Sean back to his home state of New Jersey. Gleeson accepted the same position that he had previously held at Oklahoma State University with Rutgers. The signed contract made Gleeson the highest paid assistant coach in Rutgers University history. On October 9, 2022, Sean was fired.

=== Northwestern ===
Gleeson joined Northwestern Wildcats football in 2023 as a Senior Offensive Analyst.

=== Missouri ===
Gleeson joined Missouri Tigers football in 2023 as an Analyst.

On July 28, 2024, head coach Eliah Drinkwitz announced Gleeson will serve as Quarterbacks Coach, assisting offensive coordinator Kirby Moore

== Personal life ==
Gleeson met his wife, Lauren, while they were both working at Delbarton School. They have three sons, Eamon, Patrick, and William. Gleeson also has two sisters, Carly and Haley, and a brother, Liam.
