= Arts-based training =

Form of employee training

Arts-based training is a form of employee training that uses creative activities to enhance problem-solving, teamwork, and communication skills. It can be defined as employee or staff development training (such as team building, communication/listening skills) delivered using the arts (music, visual art, and drama). It is used in many sectors in business — from solicitors and law firms, to local councils and community-based organizations. In the United Kingdom, it began to be adopted in the 1990s, primarily in London, and has now spread through the country. In the United States alone, more than 400 of the Fortune 500 corporations and countless smaller firms employ arts-based learning in participatory workshops, skill-based training programs, hands-on consulting sessions with business units, individual and team coaching, case studies in action, and lectures and demonstrations at leadership conferences. Organizations have since began adopting arts-based learning worldwide.

== In the workplace ==
In recent years, there has been a growth in the use of arts programs by corporations to meet a wide range of employee training and organizational development needs. Companies use these various programs to foster creative thinking, promote the development of new leadership models, and strengthen employee skills in critical areas such as collaboration, conflict resolution, change management, presentation, public speaking, and intercultural communication. Arts organizations such as Orpheus Chamber Orchestra and Second City Theatre, along with individual practitioners such as visual artist Todd Siler and jazz musician Michael Gold established this field at about the same time. "Orchestrating Collaboration at Work" by Arthur Van Gundy and Linda Naiman, published in 2003, was one of the first books published for practitioners in the field.

== Worldwide ==
Lotte Darsø, author of Artful Creation: Learning-Tales of Arts-in-Business was the first to map the interplay between arts and business in Europe and North America. The key questions asked in her research were: "In what ways can business learn from artists?”, "What can be learned?" and "What kind of learning takes place?" Darsø proposes two approaches for Arts-in-Business: The Arts applied as an instrument for team building, communication training, leadership development, problem-solving and innovation; and the Arts integrated as a strategic process of organizational transformation. Steven Taylor and Donna Ladkin offered a model of four different processes, skills transfer, projective techniques, illustration of essence, and making, used in arts-based learning in 2009. Schuima's 2012 book, The Value of Arts for Business provides a comprehensive review of the use of arts in business.

== Organizations ==
Terry McGraw, chairman and CEO of the McGraw Hill Companies, characterizes creativity as a "business imperative", and puts his companies' successful experiences with arts-based learning in a broad strategic context of "surfacing creativity" through engagement with the arts.

Keith Weed, chairman, Lever Fabergé sees employee involvement as a key part of developing and sustaining an innovative and creative business. Catalyst, their internal arts and creativity program, "brings artists and arts organizations into the business to motivate, inspire, challenge and unlock the potential of our staff, on both a professional and personal level. Artists and arts organizations come into the workplace to tackle specific business issues, from creative thinking to leadership styles and writing skills."

In reviewing The Art of Business: Make All Your Work a Work of Art, Tom Peters commented:

The authors persuasively argue that we are entering an economy which will value—insist upon! —a new way of looking at value creation. They call it moving from an emphasis on "economic flow" (input-output) to "artistic flow." The altered nature of enterprise, the "four elements" of new business thinking: "See yourself as an artist." "See your work as a work of art." "See your customers as an audience." "See your competition as teachers."

== See also ==
- Art-based research
- Arts-based environmental education
