= John Wozniak (American football coach) =

American football player and coach (born 1977)

Cleveland Browns
- Title: Assistant wide receivers coach

Personal information
- Born: March 24, 1977 (age 49); Milwaukee, Wisconsin, U.S.

Career information
- College: Knox

Career history
- Knox (TE) (1999); Knox (OC) (2000–2003); Oklahoma State (GA) (2004); LSU (GA) (2005); Georgia Southern (ST/TE) (2006); LSU (OQC) (2007); Montana State (ST/TE) (2008); Memphis (ST) (2009); West Georgia (OC) (2010); UAB (RB) (2011); Alabama (ST Analyst) (2012); Southern Miss (ST/WR) (2013–2016); Oklahoma State (RB) (2017–2024); Arizona State (OA) (2025); Cleveland Browns (2026–present) Assistant wide receivers coach

John Wozniak (born March 24, 1977) is an American football coach and former player. He is currently the assistant wide receivers coach for the Cleveland Browns and formerly an offensive analyst at Arizona State University, and running back coach at Oklahoma State University. He has been heavily involved with either offense, special teams, or both at all of his stops.

== Playing career ==
Wozniak played quarterback and wide receiver during his time at Knox College. After his senior season in 1998, he was named All-Midwest Conference honorable mention as a QB.

== Coaching career ==
=== Knox College ===
Following Wozniak's playing career at Knox College, he immediately joined the coaching staff at his alma mater, where he served as the Tight end coach and Punters coach for the 1999 season. The next year, Wozniak was promoted to offensive coordinator, a position he held through the 2003 season.

=== Les Miles ===
In 2004, Wozniak made the jump to division 1 football as he was hired by Les Miles at Oklahoma State. Wozniak was an offensive graduate assistant for one season, before following Miles to LSU for the 2005 season. After spending the 2006 season as the tight ends coach and special teams coordinator at Georgia Southern, Wozniak return for one more season with Miles at LSU as an offensive quality control coach. The 2007 season proved to be successful as the Tigers won the 2007 BCS National Championship game.

=== Special teams ===
In 2008, Wozniak returned to an on-the-field position, again as the tight ends coach and special teams coordinator at Montana State for head coach Rob Ash. Wozniak coach three All-Big Sky players in his lone season, as tight end Brandon Bostick, punter Erik Fisher, and kicker Jason Cunningham each earned all-conference honors. The following season, Wozniak was hired by Tommy West to be the special teams coordinator for the Memphis Tigers football program. Unfortunately, the tigers struggled, and West and his staff were fired following the 2009 season.

=== Back to offense ===
For the 2010 season, Wozniak was the offensive coordinator at West Georgia Wolves for head coach Daryl Dickey. In 2011, Wozniak was hired as the running backs coach at UAB by head coach Neil Callaway. Former Memphis head coach Tommy West was also hired to be the defensive coordinator for the team. The coaching staff was let go following the season.

=== Return to special teams ===
In 2012, Wozniak rebounded as he won another National Championship. This time, he was a special teams analyst for Nick Saban at Alabama From 2013 through 2016, Wozniak served as the special teams coordinator at Southern Miss, while also coaching the teams wide receivers. Wozniak was hired by Todd Monken, who was the wide receivers coach at Oklahoma State during Wosniak's first year there. Wozniak and Monken also worked together at LSU, and even share the same alma mater. Wozniak was retained by new head coach Jay Hopson for the 2016 season.

=== Oklahoma State ===
Since 2017, Wozniak has been on the Oklahoma State coaching staff coaching the running backs. He has coached prominent players such as Justice Hill and Chuba Hubbard. He was hired by current Head Coach Mike Gundy, who was the offensive coordinator during Wozniak's first stop at OSU. In 2024, after Oklahoma State finished 3-9 on the season (0-9 in conference play), most of the position coaches, including Coach Wozniak, were not retained.

=== Arizona State ===
In late March of 2025, Wozniak joined Kenny Dillingham's staff at Arizona State as an offensive analyst.

=== Cleveland Browns ===
On March 28, 2026, the Cleveland Browns hired Wozniak to serve as the team's assistant wide receivers coach.

== Personal life ==
Wozniak graduated from Knox with degrees in physics and secondary education in 1999. He is married to his wife, Jessica, and they have a daughter named Audrey.
