= Arthur B. VanGundy =

- Born: Arthur Boice VanGundy Jr. May 24, 1946; Lancaster, Ohio, US
- Died: May 5, 2009 (aged 62); Norman, Oklahoma, US
- Education: Ohio State University
- Known for: Creative problem-solving, Creativity techniques
- Spouse: Denilyn Wilson VanGundy
- Scientific career
- Fields: Marketing, Communication, Creativity
- Workplaces: University of Oklahoma

Arthur Boice "Andy" VanGundy Jr. (May 24, 1946 – May 5, 2009) was a US communication professor, conference speaker, author and internationally noted expert on idea-generation techniques.

== Biography ==
Arthur B. VanGundy Jr. was born May 24, 1946, in Lancaster, Ohio, to Dr. Arthur Boice and Sarajane ("Sally") Miesse VanGundy as the eldest of four boys. He graduated from high school in Lancaster in 1964 and earned a B.A. in psychology from Ohio Wesleyan University in 1968, a M.S. in personnel counseling from Miami University (Ohio) in 1970, and a Ph.D. in higher education administration from Ohio State University in 1975; during this time he worked as an organizational development consultant for the US Air Force. In 1976, he moved to Norman, Oklahoma, as assistant professor of human relationships at the University of Oklahoma. He became an associate professor in 1982 and full professor in 1987, after moving to the Department of Communication, where he worked until his retirement in May 2008.

While at the Ohio State University, he married Denilyn Wilson, who moved with him to Norman. The couple had two daughters, Sarah and Laura. The marriage was later divorced in 1988.

== Work ==
VanGundy contributed more than 16 books and numerous book chapters and magazine articles in magazines like Business Week, U.S. News & World Report, and The New York Times. His book "Techniques of structured problem solving" is considered by many as "the bible of problem solving techniques". He wrote the creativity training program for the American Management Association (AMA) and the creativity chapter for the American Marketing Association’s (AMA) Marketing Encyclopedia. He performed research specifically in the area of the creative person and the creative climate.

His tools and techniques expertise span from performing research on ideation performance to the design of numerous new creative problem solving formats and strategies, such as the PICL-list, Word Diamond, Fresh Eye, Object Stimulation, Try to become the problem, and Air Cliché/Haikugami, including both purely intuitive techniques and highly structured formats.

He served on the board of directors for the annual North American creativity conference CPSI and the Creative Education Foundation (CEF). Also he was the editor of CPSI/CEF’s Creativity in Action newsletter and a member of the Academy of Management.

== Books ==
- Arthur B. VanGundy: 101 Activities for teaching creativity and problem solving. San Francisco 2005 ISBN 0787974021
- Arthur B. VanGundy: 101 More Great Games and Activities. New York 2005. ISBN 9780787969004
- Arthur B. VanGundy: 108 Ways to get a bright idea. New Jersey 1983. ISBN 0-13-634824-6
- Arthur B. VanGundy: Brain Boosters for Business Advantage. New York 1994. ISBN 0-89384-267-2
- Arthur B. VanGundy: Creative Problem Solving: A guide for trainers and management. Westport 1987. ISBN 0899301703 According to WorldCat, the book is held in 1192 libraries
- Arthur B. VanGundy: Getting to Innovation: How Asking the Right Questions Generates the Great Ideas Your Company Needs. New York 2007. ISBN 0-8144-0898-2 According to WorldCat, the book is held in 1389 libraries
- Arthur B. VanGundy: Idea Power. New York: American Management Association 1992. ISBN 0-8144-5045-8 According to WorldCat, the book is held in 1986 libraries
- Arthur B. VanGundy: Managing Group Creativity: A Modular Approach to Problem Solving. New York 1984. ISBN 0-8144-5545-X
- Arthur B. VanGundy: Stalking the Wild Solution: A Problem Finding Approach to Creative Problem Solving. 1988 ISBN 0943456193
- Arthur B. VanGundy: Techniques of structured problem solving. New York 1988. ISBN 0-442-21223-2
- Arthur B. VanGundy: Training your creative mind. Englewood Cliffs 1982. ISBN 0-13-926709-3
- Arthur B. VanGundy, Linda Naimann: Orchestrating Collaboration at work. 2003. ISBN 1419651749
