= Mike Gundy =

American football player and coach (born 1967)

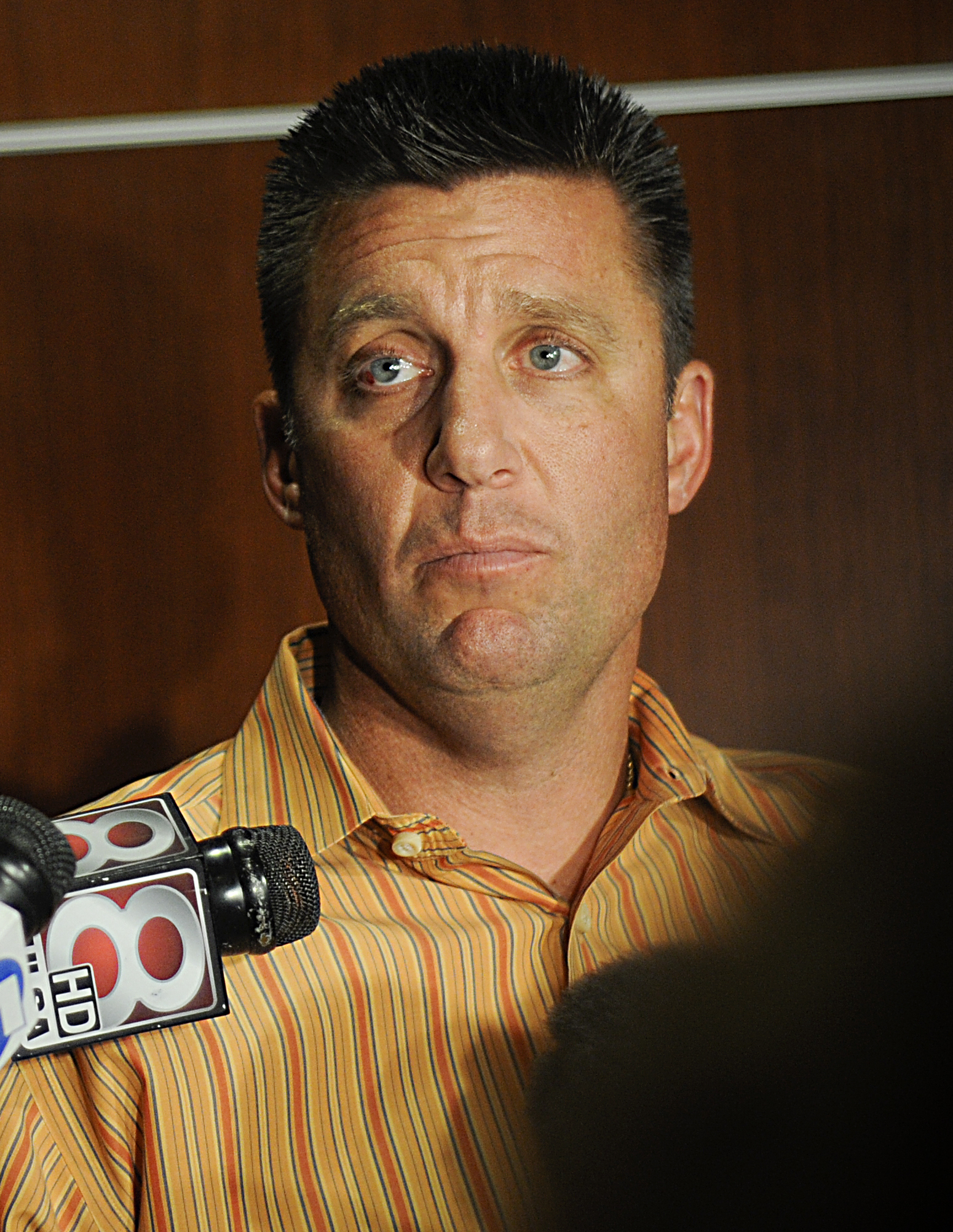
- Gundy in 2011

Biographical details
- Born: August 12, 1967 (age 59); Midwest City, Oklahoma, U.S.

Playing career
- 1986–1989: Oklahoma State
- Position: Quarterback

Coaching career (HC unless noted)
- 1990: Oklahoma State (WR)
- 1991–1993: Oklahoma State (QB)
- 1994: Oklahoma State (OC/QB)
- 1995: Oklahoma State (QB)
- 1996: Baylor (PGC/QB)
- 1997–1999: Maryland (WR)
- 2000: Maryland (PGC/QB)
- 2001–2004: Oklahoma State (AHC/OC)
- 2005–2025: Oklahoma State

Head coaching record
- Overall: 170–90
- Bowls: 12–6

Accomplishments and honors

Championships
- Big 12 (2011); Big 12 South Division (2010)

Awards
- 3× Big 12 Coach of the Year (2010, 2021, 2023); Paul "Bear" Bryant Award (2011); Eddie Robinson Coach of the Year (2011); Second-team All-Big Eight (1988); Oklahoma Sports Hall of Fame (2021)

Michael Ray Gundy (born August 12, 1967) is an American college football coach and former player. Gundy played quarterback for Oklahoma State from 1986 to 1989 and later served as their head coach from 2005 to 2025.

In his 21-season head coaching tenure at Oklahoma State, Gundy became the winningest coach in program history, leading the Cowboys to 12 bowl wins overall and a Big 12 Conference title in 2011. He was named the Big 12 Coach of the Year three times, and won the Paul "Bear" Bryant Award in 2011.

== Playing career ==
At Midwest City High School, Gundy played quarterback, and was voted Oklahoma Player of the Year in 1986. His high school football coach was Dick Evans. Gundy was heavily recruited by the Oklahoma Sooners but in the end signed with the Oklahoma State University Cowboys. He became the starting quarterback midway through his freshman year. Gundy went on to become the all-time leading passer in Oklahoma State and Big Eight Conference history. In four seasons Gundy threw 49 touchdowns and 7,997 yards, including 2,106 yards in 1987 and 2,163 in 1988. He led the Cowboys to bowl wins in the 1987 Sun Bowl and 1988 Holiday Bowl aided by two Hall of Fame running backs: Thurman Thomas and Barry Sanders. He also led OSU to two 10-win seasons.

Mike Gundy held the record for most consecutive passes attempted without an interception at the start of a career by a freshman in Division 1 history with 138, until Baylor freshman Robert Griffin III broke it in 2008. Coincidentally, Baylor was playing against Gundy's Oklahoma State team when Griffin surpassed the mark. After the game, Gundy was able to personally congratulate Griffin on the accomplishment.

Gundy graduated in 1990. His degree is in secondary education, with a focus in social studies.

== Coaching career ==
=== Early positions ===
When Gundy graduated, he joined Pat Jones' staff as an assistant coach. He was wide receiver coach in 1990, quarterback coach from 1991 to 1993 and offensive coordinator from 1994 to 1995.

Gundy was quarterbacks coach/passing game coordinator for Baylor during the 1996 season. He was on staff with Larry Fedora at Baylor and would rekindle that relationship when he became head coach at Oklahoma State, bringing Fedora on as his offensive coordinator. After the 1996 season, Gundy moved again, this time to Maryland where he was wide receiver coach and passing game coordinator from 1997 to 2000 for the Terps.

=== Oklahoma State ===
In 2001, the Oklahoma State University head football coach job became vacant when Bob Simmons resigned and a search produced Les Miles and Mike Gundy as the finalists. Miles was hired as head coach and Gundy was brought aboard as offensive coordinator. The team would go on to three straight bowl games in Miles' last three years as head coach. When Miles left in 2004 to take the LSU job, Gundy was named immediately as Miles' successor and the 22nd head coach at Oklahoma State. Gundy is one of three head football coaches at Oklahoma State to have played for Oklahoma State, along with Jim Lookabaugh and Floyd Gass.

==== 2005–2007 ====
Gundy's first season saw the expulsion of eleven players from the team and the Cowboys struggled to a 4–7 record winning only one Big 12 conference game.

In his second season, the Cowboy offense began to click and the Cowboys would finish 7–6 including a victory over the Alabama Crimson Tide in the Independence Bowl.

In 2007, the Cowboys again posted a 6–6 regular season record and a bowl win over the Indiana Hoosiers in the Insight Bowl. After their second straight bowl appearance, Gundy was rewarded with a contract extension through the 2013 season. From 2008 through 2017, Gundy led the Cowboys to 96 wins, almost 10 wins per season on average. Many people would consider this to be the most successful period in Oklahoma State football history. He has also led the Pokes to sixteen straight bowl seasons, another Cowboy record.

==== 2008 season ====
In 2008, Gundy led the Oklahoma State Cowboys to their best season in 20 years. They were ranked in the top 15 for most of the season. The season ended with an appearance in the Holiday Bowl, where they lost to Oregon. Gundy was rewarded with a new seven-year contract worth $15.7 million. The contract, which extended through the 2015 season, went into effect on January 1, 2009.

==== 2011 season ====
The high-water mark for Gundy was the 2011 season. The team was led by quarterback Brandon Weeden and eventual two-time Biletnikoff Award winner Justin Blackmon, both first-round draft picks in the 2012 NFL draft. The Cowboys' balanced attack was prolific, averaging nearly 50 points, 390 yards passing, and 550 yards of total offense per game—each top 3 in all of the FBS—with a ground program led by Joseph Randle's 24 rushing TDs, 4th in the nation, and with Randle spelled by Jeremy Smith, who contributed 7 TDs and 7 yards per carry on the year. The defense also led the FBS in turnovers with 3.4 per game.

The Cowboys began the season with a preseason ranking of 9th and spent eight weeks ranked 3rd or better. At the late-season rank of #2, which earned them a BCS Championship Game appearance if they could win the final two games, the team faltered in a shocking 2OT loss at Iowa State and fell to #3.

Despite thoroughly dismantling rival #13 Oklahoma in the Bedlam Game 44-10, they narrowly missed the chance to play undefeated LSU in the championship game, finishing .01 points behind #2 Alabama in the final aggregate BCS poll. Instead of the championship, the team was invited to the program's first BCS game, where they defeated Andrew Luck and the Stanford Cardinal 41–38 in overtime at the 2012 Fiesta Bowl.

The team finished first in the Big 12 Conference, the program's first conference championship since 1976 (when they tied as co-champions) and first outright conference championship since 1948. The final AP poll ranked the team third with four 1st place votes, behind LSU and Alabama with one and fifty-five 1st place votes, respectively. The Colley Matrix, one of six computer rankings that, along with the AP and Coaches' polls comprised the BCS rankings, selected the team as national champions.

The season also saw Gundy become the school's winningest coach. At the end of the season, he was given the Bear Bryant and Eddie Robinson awards for coach of the year.

==== 2012–2025 ====
Gundy's teams won at least 10 games in 2013, 2015, 2016 and 2017, including an appearance in the 2016 Sugar Bowl–the third major-bowl appearance in school history. Gundy had a hand in 10 of Oklahoma State's eleven 10-win seasons–two as a player, eight as head coach.

In October 2020, Gundy signed a new "perpetual" or rolling 5-year contract.

After a disappointing 2024 season where Oklahoma State went 0–9 in conference play, followed by a 1–2 start to the 2025 season, Gundy was fired three games into his 21st season on September 23, 2025. He compiled a 170–90 record at Oklahoma State with 12 bowl wins and one conference title. At the time of his firing, he was the second-longest-tenured head coach—behind Kirk Ferentz of Iowa—in college football.

==== Bedlam Series ====
After the 2012 season, the Cowboys are 4–15 vs. the Oklahoma Sooners under Gundy as head coach. They won in 2011, 2014, 2021 and 2023. Gundy has been associated with the series 33 times as a player or a coach.

== Controversies ==
=== 2007 dispute with the media ===
On September 22, 2007, Gundy made comments that became the subject of a nationwide media controversy and generated a viral video. During a press conference following his team's victory over the Texas Tech Red Raiders, Gundy criticized an article by Jenni Carlson of The Oklahoman. The article contained guesses as to why quarterback Bobby Reid, who had been publicly supported by the coaching staff earlier in the year, was demoted to second-string. Gundy condemned the article as a personal attack on a young player and offered himself as a better target for criticism when he shouted "Come after me! I'm a man! I'm forty!" Gundy has stated that he does not mind criticizing college athletes' on-field performance but does not appreciate critiquing college athletes otherwise.

The Oklahoman sports editor, Mike Sherman, stood by the story. Mike Griffith, president of the Football Writers Association of America, called Gundy's behavior "completely inappropriate". CBS Sportsline's Dennis Dodd went further saying, "Mike Gundy needs to be reprimanded, definitely suspended, probably fined and maybe fired." OSU athletic director Mike Holder stood behind Gundy, saying that "nothing is more important to us than our student-athletes." Gundy would later state that the incident was a blessing in disguise, as the image of his strident defense of one of his players had a lasting positive effect on recruiting.

=== 2013 allegations of Gundy arranging payment for players ===
In September 2013, Sports Illustrated published a series of articles as part of an investigation beginning with Les Miles' tenure as head coach at Oklahoma State from 2001 and continuing through Gundy's tenure beginning in 2011. The allegations concerning Gundy included involvement in a bonus system for players along with direct payments and no-show or sham jobs involving boosters, continuing diminished academic standards including players playing who were otherwise academically ineligible such as having players' school work done by so-called tutors and other school personnel, tolerating widespread drug abuse among the players by continuing a sham drug counseling program and selective drug enforcement, and also purportedly like Miles, personally interviewing hostess candidates for the Orange Pride hostess program and facilitating some hostesses having sex with prospective recruits.

In response to the allegations, Gundy stated: "I'm very proud of what we've accomplished here, both on and off the field. Our goal has always been to take young people from where their parents have gotten them and to make them better over a four- or five-year period. We're very proud of that in many ways. So, until further time—and obviously the university will make that decision—there's not any comment that we would have on the Sports Illustrated article."

Miles generally denied any wrongdoing during his time as head coach at OSU. Following the SI series Oklahoma State conducted an intensive review of practices policies led by Charles Smart. There were no findings of misconduct of any significance found. Many current and former players, professors, and supporters have made statements disputing the SI articles.

=== 2020 One America News incident ===
In June 2020, star running back Chuba Hubbard threatened to boycott Oklahoma State after Gundy was photographed wearing a t-shirt of television channel One America News, which Gundy has supported in previous statements. Linebacker Amen Ogbongbemiga also threatened to sit in response to the photo. Gundy subsequently issued an apology, saying he was "disgusted" by OAN's attitude towards the Black Lives Matter movement. In light of the controversy, Gundy suggested taking a $1M pay cut and agreed to other concessions concluding the incident. Hubbard eventually apologized for the way he handled the situation.

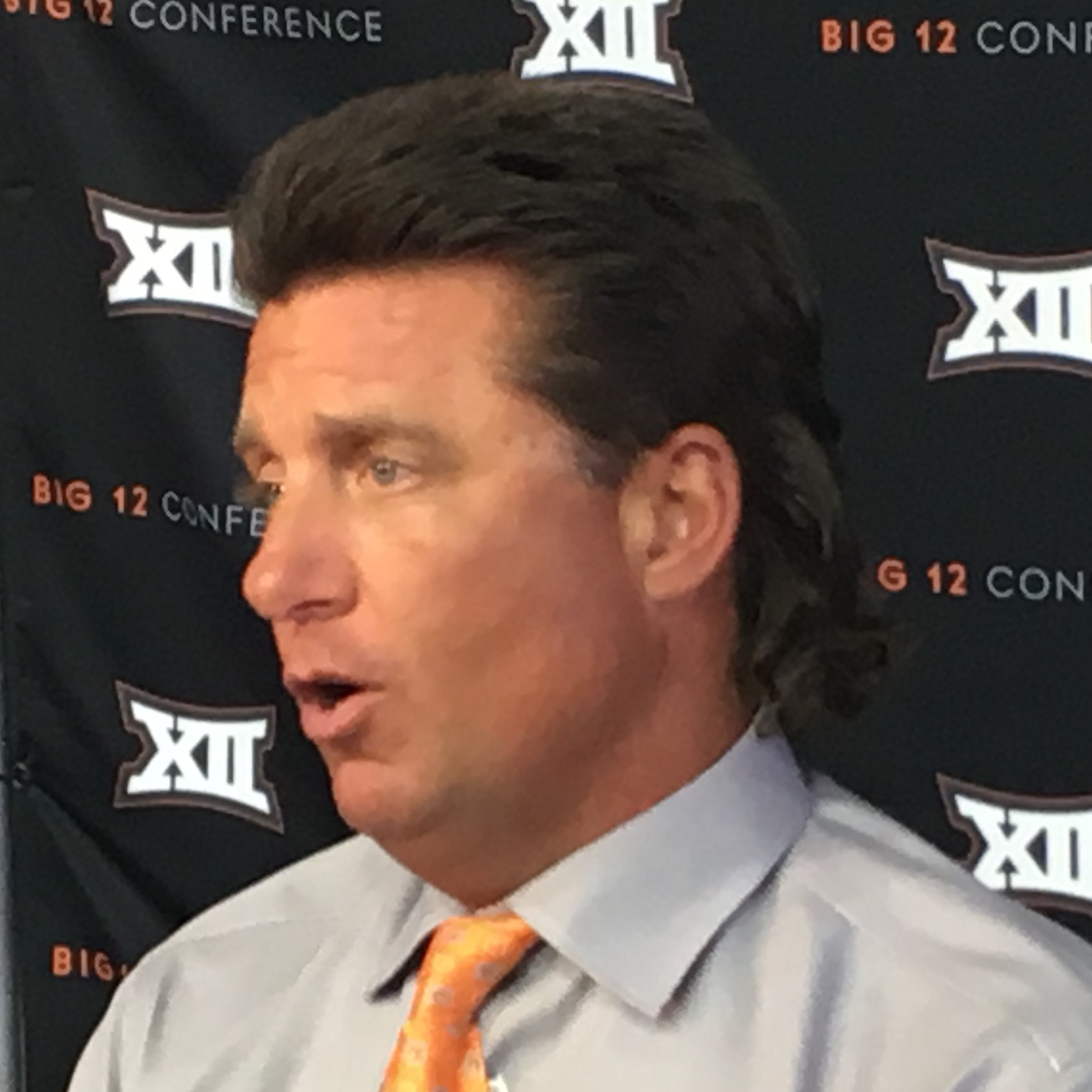
Gundy's mullet haircut (pictured in 2017) has received significant media attention.

=== 2024 Ollie Gordon Comments ===
On June 30, 2024, Oklahoma State running back Ollie Gordon was pulled over after swerving his car into an adjacent lane twice and speeding 17 miles per hour over the speed limit. After being pulled over, he was found with open bottles of vodka and tequila, both of which were half empty. He was arrested on complaint of a DUI, transport of an open container of alcohol, failure to maintain single lane traffic and speeding. While at the Cleveland County Jail, he registered a blood alcohol level of .11% and .10% (At the time of Gordon's arrest, Oklahoma's legal blood alcohol limit for driving was .08%).

In an interview at the Big 12 Conference media day the following week, Gundy was asked about his decision to allow Gordon to participate in the event despite the pending charges. Gundy responded by saying that he looked up what the legal limit was before stating "...I thought, really two or three beers or four — I'm not justifying what Ollie did, I'm telling you what decision I made — well, I thought 'I've probably done that a thousand times in my life, and you know, was just fine.' So I got lucky. People get lucky."

Many media outlets commented on his remarks, confused as to why he would defend his decision in such a manner and condemning his seemingly passive dismissal of driving under the influence. The nonprofit organization Mothers Against Drunk Driving also issued a statement regarding Gundy's response stating "MADD is disappointed by the recent remarks made by Oklahoma State University football coach Mike Gundy...Such statements are not only irresponsible but also dangerous, as they undermine the serious risks associated with drunk driving."

On July 9, 2024, Gundy posted on Twitter "My intended point today at Big 12 media days was that we are all guilty of making bad decisions. It was not a reference to something specific.

== Personal life ==
Gundy and his wife, Kristen, have three children, Gavin, Gunnar and Gage. His brother, Cale Gundy, was a starting quarterback at Oklahoma in the 1990s and was OU's Assistant Head Coach, Director of Recruiting and Inside Receivers Coach.

Gundy has also accrued fame for his "million-dollar mullet".

In 2021, Gundy was inducted into the Oklahoma Sports Hall of Fame.

== Head coaching record ==
Year	Team	Overall	Conference	Standing	Bowl/playoffs	Coaches^{#}	AP^{°}
Oklahoma State Cowboys (Big 12 Conference) (2005–2025)
2005	Oklahoma State	4–7	1–7	6th (South)			
2006	Oklahoma State	7–6	3–5	T–5th (South)	W Independence		
2007	Oklahoma State	7–6	4–4	T–3rd (South)	W Insight		
2008	Oklahoma State	9–4	5–3	4th (South)	L Holiday	18	16
2009	Oklahoma State	9–4	6–2	2nd (South)	L Cotton	25	
2010	Oklahoma State	11–2	6–2	T–1st (South)	W Alamo	10	13
2011	Oklahoma State	12–1	8–1	1st	W Fiesta^{†}	3	3
2012	Oklahoma State	8–5	5–4	T–3rd	W Heart of Dallas		
2013	Oklahoma State	10–3	7–2	T–2nd	L Cotton	17	17
2014	Oklahoma State	7–6	4–5	7th	W Cactus		
2015	Oklahoma State	10–3	7–2	T–2nd	L Sugar^{†}	19	20
2016	Oklahoma State	10–3	7–2	T–2nd	W Alamo	11	11
2017	Oklahoma State	10–3	6–3	3rd	W Camping World	14	14
2018	Oklahoma State	7–6	3–6	T–7th	W Liberty		
2019	Oklahoma State	8–5	5–4	T–3rd	L Texas		
2020	Oklahoma State	8–3	6–3	3rd	W Cheez-It	19	20
2021	Oklahoma State	12–2	8–1	2nd	W Fiesta^{†}	7	7
2022	Oklahoma State	7–6	4–5	T–5th	L Guaranteed Rate		
2023	Oklahoma State	10–4	7–2	T–2nd	W Texas	16	16
2024	Oklahoma State	3–9	0–9	16th			
2025	Oklahoma State	1–2 (Note: Oklahoma State fired Gundy after three games.)	0–0				
Oklahoma State:		170–90	102–72				
Total:		170–90					
National championship Conference title Conference division title or championship game berth
^{†}Indicates BCS or CFP / New Years' Six bowl.; ^{#}Rankings from final Coaches Poll.; ^{°}Rankings from final AP Poll.
