= 2019 All-Big 12 Conference football team =

The 2019 All-Big 12 Conference football team consists of American football players chosen as All-Big 12 Conference players for the 2019 Big 12 Conference football season. The conference recognizes two official All-Big 12 selectors: (1) the Big 12 conference coaches selected separate offensive and defensive units and named first- and second-team players (the "Coaches" team); and (2) a panel of sports writers and broadcasters covering the Big 12 also selected offensive and defensive units and named first- and second-team players (the "Media" team).

== Offensive selections ==
=== Quarterbacks ===
- Jalen Hurts, Oklahoma (Coaches-1; Media-1)
- Brock Purdy, Iowa State (Coaches-2; Media-2)

=== Running backs ===
- Chuba Hubbard, Oklahoma State (Coaches-1; Media-1)
- Pooka Williams Jr., Kansas (Coaches-1; Media-1)
- Kennedy Brooks, Oklahoma (Coaches-2; Media-2)
- Breece Hall, Iowa State (Coaches-2; Media-2)

=== Fullbacks ===
- Nick Lenners, Kansas State (Coaches-1)
- Koby Bullard, Baylor (Coaches-2)

=== Centers ===
- Creed Humphrey, Oklahoma (Coaches-1; Media-1)
- Zach Shackelford, Texas (Coaches-1; Media-2)

=== Guards ===
- Sam Tecklenburg, Baylor (Coaches-2; Media-1)
- Marcus Keyes, Oklahoma State (Media-1)
- Parker Braun, Texas (Media-2)
- Josh Rivas, Kansas State (Media-2)

=== Tackles ===
- Julian Good-Jones, Iowa State (Coaches-1; Media-1)
- Colton McKivitz, West Virginia (Coaches-1; Media-1)
- Hakeem Adeniji, Kansas (Coaches-1; Media-2)
- Sam Cosmi, Texas (Coaches-2; Media-2)
- Adrian Ealy, Oklahoma (Coaches-2)
- Travis Bruffy, Texas Tech (Coaches-2)
- Scott Frantz, Kansas State (Coaches-2)

=== Tight ends ===
- Charlie Kolar, Iowa State (Coaches-1; Media-1)
- Pro Wells, TCU (Coaches-2; Media-2)
- Chase Allen, Iowa State (Media-2)

=== Receivers ===
- Devin Duvernay, Texas (Coaches-1; Media-1)
- CeeDee Lamb, Oklahoma (Coaches-1; Media-1)
- Denzel Mims, Baylor (Coaches-1; Media-2)
- Tylan Wallace, Oklahoma State (Coaches-2; Media-2)
- Deshaunte Jones, Iowa State (Coaches-2)
- Jeremiah Hall, Oklahoma (Coaches-2)
- Jalen Reagor, TCU (Coaches-2)

== Defensive selections ==
=== Defensive linemen ===
- Wyatt Hubert, Kansas State (Coaches-1; Media-1)
- James Lynch, Baylor (Coaches-1; Media-1)
- Bravvion Roy, Baylor (Coaches-1; Media-1)
- Ross Blacklock, TCU (Coaches-1; Media-2)
- Neville Gallimore, Oklahoma (Coaches-2; Media-1)
- Darius Stills, West Virginia (Coaches-1; Media-2)
- Ronnie Perkins, Oklahoma (Coaches-2; Media-2)
- Eli Howard, Texas Tech (Coaches-2)
- Ray Lima, Iowa State (Coaches-2)
- Malcolm Roach, Texas (Media-2)
- Dante Stills, West Virginia (Coaches-2)

=== Linebackers ===
- Jordyn Brooks, Texas Tech (Coaches-1; Media-1)
- Kenneth Murray, Oklahoma (Coaches-1; Media-1)
- Garret Wallow, TCU (Coaches-1; Media-1)
- Terrel Bernard, Baylor (Coaches-2; Media-2)
- Clay Johnston, Baylor (Coaches-2; Media-2)
- Amen Ogbongbemiga, Oklahoma State (Coaches-2)
- Malcolm Rodriguez, Oklahoma State (Coaches-2)
- Marcel Spears Jr., Iowa State (Media-2)

=== Defensive backs ===
- Jeff Gladney, TCU (Coaches-1; Media-1)
- Kolby Harvell-Peel, Oklahoma State (Coaches-1; Media-1)
- Trevon Moehrig, TCU (Coaches-1; Media-1)
- Douglas Coleman, Texas Tech (Coaches-1; Media-2)
- Parnell Motley, Oklahoma (Coaches-2; Media-1)
- Greg Eisworth, Iowa State (Coaches-1)
- Grayland Arnold, Baylor (Coaches-2; Media-2)
- Keith Washington, West Virginia (Coaches-2; Media-2)
- A. J. Green, Oklahoma State (Media-2)
- Brandon Jones, Texas (Coaches-2)
- Chris Miller, Baylor (Coaches-2)
- Josh Norwood, West Virginia (Coaches-2)

== Special teams ==
=== Kickers ===
- Jonathan Song, TCU (Coaches-1; Media-1)
- Gabe Brkic, Oklahoma (Coaches-2; Media-2)

=== Punters ===
- Austin McNamara, Texas Tech (Coaches-1; Media-1)
- Devin Anctil, Kansas State (Coaches-2; Media-2)

=== All-purpose / Return specialists ===
- Joshua Youngblood, Kansas State (Coaches-1; Media-1)
- Jalen Reagor, TCU (Coaches-2; Media-2)

== Key ==
Bold = selected as a first-team player by both the coaches and media panel

Coaches = selected by Big 12 Conference coaches

Media = selected by a media panel

== See also ==
- 2019 College Football All-America Team
