= 2019 Big 12 Conference football season =

American college football season

- League: NCAA Division I Football Bowl Subdivision
- Sport: Football
- Duration: August 29, 2019; December 7, 2019
- Teams: 10
- TV partner(s): Fox Family (Fox, FS1, FSN), ESPN Family (ABC, ESPN, ESPN2, ESPN3, ESPNU, ESPN+, LHN)

2020 NFL Draft
- Top draft pick: CeeDee Lamb (Oklahoma)
- Picked by: Dallas Cowboys, 17th overall

Championship Game
- Champions: Oklahoma
- Runners-up: Baylor
- Finals MVP: CeeDee Lamb, WR

Seasons
- 2018 2020

2019 Big 12 Conference football standings
	Conf.			Overall
Team	W		L	W		L
No. 7 Oklahoma y$^	8	–	1	12	–	2
No. 13 Baylor y	8	–	1	11	–	3
No. 25 Texas	5	–	4	8	–	5
Oklahoma State	5	–	4	8	–	5
Kansas State	5	–	4	8	–	5
Iowa State	5	–	4	7	–	6
West Virginia	3	–	6	5	–	7
TCU	3	–	6	5	–	7
Texas Tech	2	–	7	4	–	8
Kansas	1	–	8	3	–	9
Championship: Oklahoma 30, Baylor 23 ^{OT}
^ – College Football Playoff participant; $ – Conference champion; y – Championship game participant; Rankings from AP Poll

The 2019 Big 12 Conference football season was the 24th season of Big 12 conference football, taking place during the 2019 NCAA Division I FBS football season. The season began with non-conference play on August 29, 2019. Conference play began on September 21, 2019. The entire schedule was released on October 18, 2018.

The 2019 season was the eighth for the Big 12 since the early-2010s conference realignment brought the Big 12 membership to its current form.

As a ten–team league, the Big 12 played a nine-game round-robin conference schedule and each member played three non-conference games, one of which had to be against a Power Five conference foe. The regular season was followed by a conference championship game played between the regular-season champion and the regular-season runner-up. The 2019 Big 12 Championship Game was held at AT&T Stadium in Arlington, Texas, on Saturday, December 7, 2019.

== Preseason ==
=== Recruiting ===
National Rankings
Team	ESPN	Rivals	Scout	24/7	Total Signees
Baylor	#34	#33	#43	#35	25
Iowa State	#47	#48	#36	#46	23
Kansas	#67	#74	#70	#68	17
Kansas State	#55	#67	#59	#62	22
Oklahoma	#4	#5	#8	#6	24
Oklahoma State	#41	#40	#39	#38	20
TCU	#32	#29	#30	#33	28
Texas	#5	#4	#6	#3	26
Texas Tech	#63	#61	#67	#61	20
West Virginia	#45	#47	#49	#48	21

=== Big 12 Media Days ===
The Big 12 media days will be held on July 15–16 in Frisco, Texas.

==== Preseason poll ====
The 2019 Big 12 Preseason media poll was released on July 10, 2019. Prior to the Big 12 media days. Oklahoma was chosen to finish at the top of the standings for the fourth consecutive year in the Big 12 football preseason poll, voted on by media representatives.

Big 12
Predicted finish	Team	Votes (1st place)
1	Oklahoma	761 (68)
2	Texas	696 (9)
3	Iowa State	589
4	TCU	474
5	Oklahoma State	460
6	Baylor	453
7	Texas Tech	281
8	West Virginia	241
9	Kansas State	191
10	Kansas	89

- First place votes in ()

=== Preseason awards ===
2019 Preseason All-Big 12

- Offensive Player of the Year: Sam Ehlinger, Texas
- Defensive Player of the Year: Kenneth Murray, Oklahoma
- Newcomer of the Year: Jalen Hurts, Oklahoma

All-Big 12 Offense
Position	Player	Class	Team
QB	Sam Ehlinger	Jr.	Texas
RB	Pooka Williams Jr.	So.	Kansas
RB	Kennedy Brooks	So.	Oklahoma
RB	*Chuba Hubbard	So.	Oklahoma State
WR	CeeDee Lamb	Jr.	Oklahoma
WR	Tylan Wallace	Jr.	Oklahoma State
WR	Jalen Reagor	Jr.	TCU
TE	Grant Calcaterra	Jr.	Oklahoma
OL	Jack Anderson	Jr.	Texas Tech
OL	Creed Humphrey	So.	Oklahoma
OL	Lucas Niang	Sr.	TCU
OL	Zach Shackelford	Sr.	Texas
OL	Colton McKivitz	Sr.	West Virginia
PK	Cameron Dicker	So.	Texas
KR/PR	CeeDee Lamb	Jr.	Oklahoma

All-Big 12 Defense
Position	Player	Class	Team
DL	JaQuan Bailey	Sr.	Iowa State
DL	James Lynch	Jr.	Baylor
DL	Ray Lima	Sr.	Iowa State
DL	Reggie Walker	Sr.	Kansas State
DL	Corey Bethley	Jr.	TCU
LB	Clay Johnston	Sr.	Baylor
LB	Kenneth Murray	Jr.	Oklahoma
LB	Marcel Spears Jr.	Sr.	Iowa State
DB	A. J. Green	Sr.	Oklahoma State
DB	Jeff Gladney	Sr.	TCU
DB	Caden Sterns	So.	Texas
DB	Greg Eisworth	Jr.	Iowa State
DB	Adrian Frye	So.	Texas Tech
P	Kyle Thompson	Jr.	Kansas

== Head coaches ==
There will be 4 new head coaches in the Big 12 Conference for the 2019 season.

On November 4, KU fired coach David Beatty after four years at the school. Two weeks later on November 19, Les Miles was hired as the new head coach of the Jayhawks.

On November 25, Texas Tech fired coach Kliff Kingsbury after six years with the team. Four days later on November 29, Matt Wells from Utah State was hired as the new head coach of the Red Raiders.

On December 2, Bill Snyder retired from the Kansas State Wildcats after 26 years with the school. Nine days later on December 11, Chris Klieman from North Dakota State was named the new head coach of the Wildcats.

On January 1, Dana Holgorsen left West Virginia to become the new head coach of the Houston Cougars. Three days later on January 4, The team hired Neal Brown from the Troy Trojans as the new head coach of the Mountaineers.

=== Coaches ===
Team	Head coach	Years at school	Overall record	Record at school	Big–12 record
Baylor	Matt Rhule	3	36–40	5–16	5-13
Iowa State	Matt Campbell	4	54–33	17–17	13–14
Kansas	Les Miles	1	142–55	0–0	0–0
Kansas State	Chris Klieman	1	72–13	0–0	0–0
Oklahoma	Lincoln Riley	3	24–4	24–4	16–2
Oklahoma State	Mike Gundy	15	121–59	121–59	72–48
TCU	Gary Patterson	19	167–63	167–63	107–42
Texas	Tom Herman	3	39–14	14–8	12–6
Texas Tech	Matt Wells	1	44–34	0–0	0–0
West Virginia	Neal Brown	1	35–16	0–0	0–0

== Schedule ==
The regular season began on August 30 and will end on November 30.

=== Regular season ===
Index to colors and formatting
Big 12 member won
Big 12 member lost
Big 12 teams in **bold**

==== Week one ====
Date	Conference	Visitor	Home	Site	Time	Score
August 30	Pac-12	**Oklahoma State**	Oregon State	Reser Stadium • Corvallis, OR	9:30 p.m (FS1)	W, 52–36
August 31	MVFC (FCS)	Indiana State	**Kansas**	David Booth Kansas Memorial Stadium • Lawrence, KS	11:00 a.m. (FSN)	W, 24–17
August 31	MVFC (FCS)	Northern Iowa	No. 21 **Iowa State**	Jack Trice Stadium • Ames, IA	11:00 a.m. (FS1)	W, 29–26 (3OT)
August 31	CAA (FCS)	James Madison	**West Virginia**	Mountaineer Field • Morgantown, WV	2:00 p.m. (AT&TSN Pittsburgh)	W, 20–13
August 31	Big Sky (FCS)	Montana State	**Texas Tech**	Jones AT&T Stadium • Lubbock, TX	3:00 p.m. (FSN)	W 45–10
August 31	Southland (FCS)	Nicholls	**Kansas State**	Bill Snyder Family Football Stadium • Manhattan, KS	6:00 p.m. (ESPN+)	W 49–14
August 31	Southland (FCS)	Stephen F. Austin	**Baylor**	McLane Stadium • Waco, TX	6:00 p.m. (ESPN+)	W 56–17
August 31	C-USA	Louisiana Tech	No. 10 **Texas**	Darrell K Royal–Texas Memorial Stadium • Austin, TX	7:00 p.m. (LHN)	W 45–14
August 31	SWAC (FCS)	Arkansas–Pine Bluff	**TCU**	Amon G. Carter Stadium • Fort Worth, TX	8:00 p.m. (FSN)	W 39–7
September 1	American	Houston	No. 4 **Oklahoma**	Gaylord Family Oklahoma Memorial Stadium • Norman, OK	6:30 p.m. (ABC)	W 49-31
^{#}Rankings from AP Poll released prior to game.

==== Week two ====
Date	Conference	Visitor	Home	Site	Time	Score
September 7	MAC	Bowling Green	**Kansas State**	Bill Snyder Family Stadium • Manhattan, KS	11:00 a.m (FSN)	W, 52–0
September 7	SEC	**West Virginia**	Missouri	Faurot Field • Columbia, MO	11:00 a.m. (ESPN2)	L, 7–38
September 7	C-USA	UTSA	**Baylor**	McLane Stadium • Waco, TX	3:00 p.m. (FSN)	W, 63-14
September 7	Sun Belt	Coastal Carolina	**Kansas**	David Booth Kansas Memorial Stadium • Lawrence, KS	6:00 p.m. (ESPN+)	L, 7-12
September 7	Southland (FCS)	McNeese State	**Oklahoma State**	Boone Pickens Stadium • Stillwater, OK	6:00 p.m. (ESPN+)	W, 56–14
September 7	MVFC (FCS)	South Dakota	**Oklahoma**	Gaylord Family Oklahoma Memorial Stadium • Norman, OK	6:00 p.m. (FSN OK)	W, 70–14
September 7	SEC	No. 6 LSU	No. 9 **Texas**	Darrell K Royal–Texas Memorial Stadium • Austin, TX	6:30 p.m. (ABC)	L, 38–45
September 7	C-USA	UTEP	**Texas Tech**	Jones AT&T Stadium • Lubbock, TX	7:00 p.m. (FSN)	W 38–3
^{#}Rankings from AP Poll released prior to game.

==== Week three ====
Date	Conference	Visitor	Home	Site	Time	Score
September 13	ACC	**Kansas**	Boston College	Alumni Stadium • Chestnut Hill, MA	6:30 p.m. (ACCN)	W 48–24
September 14	SEC	**Kansas State**	Mississippi State	Davis Wade Stadium • Starkville, MS	11:00 a.m. (ESPN/ESPN2)	W 31–24
September 14	ACC	North Carolina State	**West Virginia**	Mountaineer Field • Morgantown, WV	11:00 a.m. (FS1)	W 44–27
September 14	American	**Oklahoma State**	Tulsa	Skelly Field at H. A. Chapman Stadium • Tulsa, OK (Rivalry)	2:30 p.m. (ABC/ESPN/ESPN2)	W 40–21
September 14	Big Ten	No. 19 Iowa	**Iowa State**	Jack Trice Stadium • Ames, IA	3:00 p.m. (FS1)	L 17–18
September 14	Big Ten	**TCU**	Purdue	Ross–Ade Stadium • West Lafayette, IN	6:30 p.m. (BTN)	W 34–13
September 14	C-USA	No. 12 **Texas**	Rice	NRG Stadium • Houston, TX (Rivalry)	7:00 p.m. (CBSSN)	W 48–13
September 14	Pac-12	No. 5 **Oklahoma**	UCLA	Rose Bowl • Pasadena, CA	7:00 p.m. (FOX)	W 48–14
September 14	Pac-12	**Texas Tech**	Arizona	Arizona Stadium • Tucson, AZ	9:30 p.m. (ESPN)	L 14–28
^{#}Rankings from AP Poll released prior to game.

==== Week four ====
Date	Conference	Visitor	Home	Site	Time	Score
September 21	Sun Belt	Louisiana–Monroe	**Iowa State**	Jack Trice Stadium • Ames, IA	11:00 a.m. (FS1)	W 72–20
September 21	American	SMU	No. 25 **TCU**	Amon G. Carter Stadium • Fort Worth, TX (Rivalry)	2:30 p.m. (FS1)	L 38–41
September 21	--	West Virginia	Kansas	David Booth Kansas Memorial Stadium • Lawrence, KS	3:30 p.m. (ESPN+)	**WVU** 29–24
September 21	C-USA	**Baylor**	Rice	Rice Stadium • Houston, TX	6:00 p.m. (CBSSN)	W 21–13
September 21	--	Oklahoma State	No. 12 Texas	Darrell K Royal–Texas Memorial Stadium • Austin, TX	6:30 p.m. (ABC)	**TEX** 36–30
^{#}Rankings from AP Poll released prior to game.

==== Week five ====
Date	Conference	Visitor	Home	Site	Time	Score
September 28	--	Texas Tech	No. 6 Oklahoma	Gaylord Family Oklahoma Memorial Stadium • Norman, OK	11:00 a.m. (FOX)	**OU** 55–16
September 28	--	Kansas	TCU	Amon G. Carter Stadium • Fort Worth, TX	11:00 a.m. (FS1)	**TCU** 51–14
September 28	--	Iowa State	Baylor	McLane Stadium • Waco, TX	2:30 p.m. (ESPN)	**BAY** 23–21
September 28	--	Kansas State	Oklahoma State	Boone Pickens Stadium • Stillwater, OK	6:00 p.m. (ESPN+)	**OKSU** 26–13
^{#}Rankings from AP Poll released prior to game.

==== Week six ====
Date	Conference	Visitor	Home	Site	Time	Score
October 5	--	No. 6 Oklahoma	Kansas	David Booth Kansas Memorial Stadium • Lawrence, KS	11:00 a.m. (ABC)	**OKLA** 45–20
October 5	--	TCU	Iowa State	Jack Trice Stadium • Ames, IA	11:00 a.m. (ESPN2)	**ISU** 49–24
October 5	--	No. 21 Oklahoma State	Texas Tech	Jones AT&T Stadium • Lubbock, TX (Rivalry)	11:00 a.m. (FS1)	**TTU** 45–35
October 5	--	No. 11 Texas	West Virginia	Mountaineer Field • Morgantown, WV	2:30 p.m. (ABC)	**TEX** 42–31
October 5	--	Baylor	Kansas State	Billy Snyder Family Football Stadium • Manhattan, KS	2:30 p.m. (ESPN2)	**BAY** 31–12
^{#}Rankings from AP Poll released prior to game.

==== Week seven ====
Date	Conference	Visitor	Home	Site	Time	Score
October 12	--	No. 6 Oklahoma	No. 11 Texas	Cotton Bowl • Dallas, TX (Red River Showdown)	11:00 a.m. (FOX)	**OKLA** 34-27
October 12	--	Texas Tech	No. 22 Baylor	McLane Stadium • Waco, TX (Rivalry)	3:00 p.m. (FS1)	**BAY** 33-30
October 12	--	Iowa State	West Virginia	Mountaineer Field • Morgantown, WV	3:00 p.m. (ESPN)	**ISU** 38-14
^{#}Rankings from AP Poll released prior to game.

==== Week eight ====
Date	Conference	Visitor	Home	Site	Time	Score
October 19	--	West Virginia	No. 5 Oklahoma	Gaylord Family Oklahoma Memorial Stadium • Norman, OK	11:00 a.m. (FOX)	**OKLA** 52-14
October 19	--	Iowa State	Texas Tech	Jones AT&T Stadium • Lubbock, TX	11:00 a.m. (FS1)	**ISU** 34-24
October 19	--	TCU	Kansas State	Bill Snyder Family Football Stadium • Manhattan, KS	1:30 p.m. (FSN)	**KSU** 24-17
October 19	--	No. 18 Baylor	Oklahoma State	Boone Pickens Stadium • Stillwater, OK	3:00 p.m. (FOX)	**BAY** 45-27
October 19	--	Kansas	No. 15 Texas	Darrell K Royal–Texas Memorial Stadium • Austin, TX	6:00 p.m. (LHN)	**TEX** 50-48
^{#}Rankings from AP Poll released prior to game.

==== Week nine ====
Date	Conference	Visitor	Home	Site	Time	Score
October 26	--	No. 5 Oklahoma	Kansas State	Bill Snyder Family Football Stadium • Manhattan, KS	11:00 a.m. (ABC)	**KSU** 48–41
October 26	--	Oklahoma State	No. 23 Iowa State	Jack Trice Stadium • Ames, IA	2:30 p.m. (FS1)	**OKSU** 34–27
October 26	--	No. 15 Texas	TCU	Amon G. Carter Stadium • Fort Worth, TX	2:30 p.m. (FOX)	**TCU** 37–27
October 26	--	Texas Tech	Kansas	David Booth Kansas Memorial Stadium • Lawrence, KS	6:00 p.m. (FS1)	**KAN** 37–34
^{#}Rankings from AP Poll released prior to game.

==== Week ten ====
Date	Conference	Visitor	Home	Site	Time	Score
October 31	--	West Virginia	No. 12 Baylor	McLane Stadium • Waco, TX	7:00 p.m. (ESPN)	**BAY** 17–14
November 2	--	No. 22 Kansas State	Kansas	David Booth Kansas Memorial Stadium • Lawrence, KS (Sunflower Showdown)	2:30 p.m. (FS1)	**KSU** 38–10
November 2	--	TCU	Oklahoma State	Boone Pickens Stadium • Stillwater, OK	2:30 p.m. (ESPN)	**OKSU** 34–27
^{#}Rankings from AP Poll released prior to game.

==== Week eleven ====
Date	Conference	Visitor	Home	Site	Time	Score
November 9	--	No. 11 Baylor	TCU	Amon G. Carter Stadium • Fort Worth, TX (Rivalry)	11:00 a.m. (FS1)	**BAY** 29–23 (3OT)
November 9	--	Texas Tech	West Virginia	Mountaineer Field • Morgantown, WV	11:00 a.m. (ESPN2)	**TTU** 38–17
November 9	--	No. 20 Kansas State	Texas	Darrell K Royal–Texas Memorial Stadium • Austin, TX	2:30 p.m. (ESPN)	**TEX** 27–24
November 9	--	Iowa State	No. 9 Oklahoma	Gaylord Family Oklahoma Memorial Stadium • Norman, OK	7:00 p.m. (FOX)	**OKLA** 42–41
^{#}Rankings from AP Poll released prior to game.

==== Week twelve ====
Date	Conference	Visitor	Home	Site	Time	Score
November 16	--	Kansas	Oklahoma State	Boone Pickens Stadium • Stillwater, OK	11:00 a.m. (FS1)	**OKSU** 31–13
November 16	--	TCU	Texas Tech	Jones AT&T Stadium • Lubbock, TX (Rivalry)	11:00 a.m. (ESPN2)	**TCU** 33–31
November 16	--	No. 22 Texas	Iowa State	Jack Trice Stadium • Ames, IA	2:30 p.m. (FS1)	**ISU** 23–21
November 16	--	West Virginia	Kansas State	Bill Snyder Family Football Stadium • Manhattan, KS	2:30 p.m. (ESPN)	**WVU** 24–20
November 16	--	No. 10 Oklahoma	No. 12 Baylor	McLane Stadium • Waco, TX	6:30 p.m. (ABC)	OKLA' 34–31
^{#}Rankings from AP Poll released prior to game.

==== Week thirteen ====
Date	Conference	Visitor	Home	Site	Time	Score
November 23	--	No. 21 Oklahoma State	West Virginia	Mountaineer Field • Morgantown, WV	11:00 a.m. (ESPN 2)	**OKSU** 20–13
November 23	--	Kansas	No. 22 Iowa State	Jack Trice Stadium • Ames, IA	11:00 a.m. (FSN)	**ISU** 41–31
November 23	--	Texas	Baylor	McLane Stadium • Waco, TX	2:30 p.m (FS1)	**BAY** 24–10
November 23	--	Kansas State	Texas Tech	Jones AT&T Stadium • Lubbock, TX	6:00 p.m. (FS1)	**KSU** 30–27
November 23	--	TCU	No. 9 Oklahoma	Gaylord Family Oklahoma Memorial Stadium • Norman, OK	7:00 p.m. (FOX)	**OKLA** 28–24
^{#}Rankings from AP Poll released prior to game.

==== Week fourteen ====
Date	Conference	Visitor	Home	Site	Time	Score
November 29	--	Texas Tech	Texas	Darrell K Royal–Texas Memorial Stadium • Austin, TX (Rivalry)	11:00 a.m. (FOX)	**TEX** 49–24
November 29	--	West Virginia	TCU	Amon G. Carter Stadium • Fort Worth, TX	2:15 p.m. (ESPN)	**WVU** 20–17
November 30	--	No. 9 Baylor	Kansas	David Booth Kansas Memorial Stadium • Lawrence, KS	2:30 p.m. (ESPN)	**BAY** 61–6
November 30	--	No. 23 Iowa State	Kansas State	Bill Snyder Family Football Stadium • Manhattan, KS (Rivalry)	6:00 p.m. (FS1)	**KSU** 27–17
November 30	--	No. 7 Oklahoma	Oklahoma State	Boone Pickens Stadium • Stillwater, OK (Bedlam Series)	7:00 p.m. (FOX)	**OKLA** 34–16
^{#}Rankings from AP Poll released prior to game.

=== Championship Game ===
Date	Time	Visiting team	Home team	Site	TV	Result	Attendance	Ref.
December 7	11:00 a.m.	No. 7 Baylor	No. 6 Oklahoma	AT&T Stadium • Arlington, Texas	ABC	OKLA 30–23 ^{OT}	65,191	
^{#}Rankings from AP Poll released prior to game.

== Big 12 vs other conferences ==
=== Big 12 vs Power 5 matchups ===
Date	Big 12 Team	Opponent	Conference	Location	Result
August 30	Oklahoma State	Oregon State	Pac-12	Reser Stadium, Corvallis, Oregon	W, 52–36
September 7	Texas	LSU	SEC	Darrell K Royal–Texas Memorial Stadium, Austin, TX	L 38–45
September 7	West Virginia	Missouri	SEC	Faurot Field, Columbia, Missouri	L 7–38
September 13	Kansas	Boston College	ACC	Alumni Stadium, Chestnut Hill, Massachusetts	W 48–24
September 14	Iowa State	Iowa (rivalry)	Big Ten	Jack Trice Stadium, Ames, IA	L 17–18
September 14	Kansas State	Mississippi State	SEC	Davis Wade Stadium, Starkville, Mississippi	W 31–24
September 14	Oklahoma	UCLA	Pac-12	Rose Bowl, Pasadena, CA	W 48–14
September 14	Texas Tech	Arizona	Pac-12	Arizona Stadium, Tucson, AZ	L 14–28
September 14	TCU	Purdue	Big Ten	Ross–Ade Stadium, West Lafayette, Indiana	W 34–13
September 14	West Virginia	NC State	ACC	Morgantown, WV	W 44–27

=== Big 12 vs Group of Five matchups ===
The following games include Big 12 teams competing against teams from the American, C-USA, MAC, Mountain West or Sun Belt.

Date	Conference	Visitor	Home	Site	Score
August 31	C–USA	Louisiana Tech	No. 10 Texas	Darrell K Royal–Texas Memorial Stadium • Austin, TX	W 45–14
September 1	American	Houston	No. 4 Oklahoma	Gaylord Family Oklahoma Memorial Stadium • Norman, OK	W 49–31
September 7	MAC	Bowling Green	Kansas State	Bill Snyder Family Football Stadium • Manhattan, KS	W 52–0
September 7	C–USA	UTSA	Baylor	McLane Stadium • Waco, TX	W 63–14
September 7	C-USA	UTEP	Texas Tech	Jones AT&T Stadium • Lubbock, TX	W 38–3
September 7	Sun Belt	Coastal Carolina	Kansas	David Booth Kansas Memorial Stadium • Lawrence, KS	L 7–12
September 14	American	Oklahoma State	Tulsa	Skelly Field H.A. Chapman Stadium • Tulsa, OK	W 40–21
September 14	C-USA	Texas	Rice	Rice Stadium • Houston, TX	W 48–13
September 21	American	SMU	TCU	Amon G. Carter Stadium • Fort Worth, TX	L 38–41
September 21	C–USA	Baylor	Rice	Rice Stadium • Houston, TX	W 21–13
September 21	Sun Belt	Louisiana–Monroe	Iowa State	Jack Trice Stadium • Ames, IA	W 72–20

=== Big 12 vs FBS independents matchups ===
The following games include Big 12 teams competing against FBS Independents, which includes Army, Liberty, New Mexico State, or UMass. The Big 12 counts games against the other two FBS independents, BYU and Notre Dame, as satisfying its requirement that Big 12 members play at least one Power Five non-conference opponent.

Date	Visitor	Home	Site	Score

=== Big 12 vs FCS matchups ===
Date	Visitor	Home	Site	Score
August 31	Indiana State	Kansas	David Booth Kansas Memorial Stadium • Lawrence, KS	W 24–17
August 31	James Madison	West Virginia	Mountaineer Field • Morgantown, WV	W 20–13
August 31	Nicholls	Kansas State	Bill Snyder Family Football Stadium • Manhattan, KS	W 49–14
August 31	Stephen F. Austin	Baylor	McLane Stadium • Waco, TX	W 56–17
August 31	Arkansas Pine–Bluff	TCU	Amon G. Carter Stadium • Fort Worth, TX	W 39–7
August 31	Northern Iowa	No. 21 Iowa State	Jack Trice Stadium • Ames, IA	W 29–26 (3OT)
August 31	Montana State	Texas Tech	Jones AT&T Stadium • Lubbock, TX	W 45–10
September 7	McNeese State	Oklahoma State	Boone Pickens Stadium • Stillwater, OK	W 56–14
September 7	South Dakota	Oklahoma	Gaylord Family Oklahoma Memorial Stadium • Norman, OK	W 70–14

=== Records against other conferences ===
Regular season

Power 5 Conferences	Record
ACC	2–0
Big Ten	1–1
BYU/Notre Dame	0–0
Pac-12	2–1
SEC	1–2
Power 5 Total	6–4
Other FBS Conferences	Record
American	2–1
C-USA	5–0
Independents (Excluding BYU and Notre Dame)	0-0
MAC	1–0
Mountain West	0-0
Sun Belt	1–1
Other FBS Total	9–2
FCS Opponents	Record
Football Championship Subdivision	9–0
Total Non-Conference Record	24–6

Post Season

Power Conferences 5	Record
ACC	0–0
Big Ten	0–0
BYU/Notre Dame	0-1
Pac-12	1–0
SEC	0-3
Power 5 Total	1–4
Other FBS Conferences	Record
American	0–1
C–USA	0–0
Independents (Excluding Notre Dame)	0–0
MAC	0–0
Mountain West	0–0
Sun Belt	0-0
Other FBS Total	0–1
Total Bowl Record	1–5

== Rankings ==
		Pre	Wk 1	Wk 2	Wk 3	Wk 4	Wk 5	Wk 6	Wk 7	Wk 8	Wk 9	Wk 10	Wk 11	Wk 12	Wk 13	Wk 14	Wk 15	Final
Baylor	AP							22	18	14	12	11	12	13	11	8	8	13
Baylor	C	RV						23	18	14	11	10	10	13	10	8	8	12
Baylor	CFP	Not released										12	13	14	9	7	8	
Iowa State	AP	21	25-T							23	RV					RV	RV	
Iowa State	C	24														RV	RV	
Iowa State	CFP	Not released												22	23			
Kansas	AP																	
Kansas	C																	
Kansas	CFP	Not released																
Kansas State	AP				RV						22	20	RV			RV	RV	
Kansas State	C				25						25	22	RV			RV	RV	
Kansas State	CFP	Not released										16	24					
Oklahoma	AP	4	4	5	5	6	6	6	5	5	10	9	10	8	7	6	4	7
Oklahoma	C	4	4	4	4	4	4	5	5	5	9	8	8	7	7	6	4	6
Oklahoma	CFP	Not released										9	10	9	7	6	4	
Oklahoma State	AP	RV					21						25	22	21	RV	25	
Oklahoma State	C	RV					25							23	21	RV	RV	RV
Oklahoma State	CFP	Not released										23	22	21	21	25	25	
TCU	AP	RV			25	RV												
TCU	C	RV																
TCU	CFP	Not released																
Texas	AP	10	9	12	12	11	11	11	15	15	RV		22	RV				25
Texas	C	10	9	13	13	12	12	11	15	15	24		23					
Texas	CFP	Not released											19					
Texas Tech	AP																	
Texas Tech	C																	
Texas Tech	CFP	Not released																
West Virginia	AP	RV																
West Virginia	C	RV																
West Virginia	CFP	Not released																

Legend
	Improvement in ranking
	Drop in ranking
	Not ranked previous week
	No change in ranking from previous week
RV	Received votes but were not ranked in Top 25 of poll
т	Tied with team above or below also with this symbol

== Postseason ==
=== Bowl games ===
Legend
Big 12 win
Big 12 loss

Bowl game	Date	Site	Television	Time (EST)	Big 12 team	Opponent	Score	Attendance
Texas Bowl	December 27	NRG Stadium • Houston, TX	ESPN	6:45 p.m.	No. 25 Oklahoma State	Texas A&M	**L** 21–24	68,415
Camping World Bowl	December 28	Camping World Stadium • Orlando, FL	ABC	12:00 p.m.	Iowa State	No. 15 Notre Dame	**L** 9–33	46,948
Liberty Bowl	December 31	Liberty Bowl Memorial Stadium • Memphis, TN	ESPN	3:45 p.m.	Kansas State	No. 23 Navy	**L** 17–20	50,515
Alamo Bowl	December 31	Alamodome • San Antonio, TX	ESPN	7:30 p.m.	Texas	No. 11 Utah	**W** 38–10	60,147
**New Year's Six Bowl Games**
Sugar Bowl	January 1, 2020	Mercedes-Benz Superdome • New Orleans, LA	ESPN	8:45 p.m.	No. 7 Baylor	No. 5 Georgia	**L** 14–26	55,211
**College Football Playoff bowl games**
Peach Bowl	December 28	Mercedes-Benz Stadium • Atlanta, GA	ESPN	4:00 p.m.	No. 4 Oklahoma	No. 1 LSU	**L** 28–63	78,347

Rankings are from CFP rankings. All times Central Time Zone. Big 12 teams shown in bold.

=== Selection of teams ===
- Bowl eligible: Baylor, Iowa State, Kansas State, Oklahoma, Oklahoma State, Texas
- Bowl-ineligible: Kansas, TCU, Texas Tech, West Virginia

== Awards and honors ==
=== Player of the week honors ===
Week	Offensive			Defensive			Specialist			Newcomer		
Week	Player	Team	Position	Player	Team	Position	Player	Team	Position	Player	Team	Position
Week 1 (Sept. 3)	Jalen Hurts	Oklahoma	QB	Garret Wallow	TCU	LB	Jonathan Song	TCU	PK	Jalen Hurts	Oklahoma	QB
Week 2 (Sept. 9)	Denzel Mims; Devin Duvernay	Baylor; Texas	WR	Brendan Radley-Hiles	Oklahoma	DB	Grayland Arnold	Baylor	S	Spencer Sanders	Oklahoma State	QB
Week 3 (Sept. 16)	Chuba Hubbard	Oklahoma State	RB	Denzel Goolsby	Kansas State	DB	Malik Knowles	Kansas State	WR/KR	Sam James	West Virginia	WR
Week 4 (Sept. 23)	Brock Purdy	Iowa State	QB	Kolby Harvell-Peel	Oklahoma State	S	Evan Staley	West Virginia	PK	Andrew Parchment	Kansas	WR
Week 5 (Sept. 30)	Chuba Hubbard (2)	Oklahoma State	RB	Clay Johnston	Baylor	LB	John Mayers; Jalen Reagor	Baylor; TCU	PK; WR/PR	Jalen Hurts (2)	Oklahoma	QB
Week 6 (Oct. 7)	Jett Duffey	Texas Tech	QB	Jordyn Brooks	Texas Tech	LB	Trey Wolff	Texas Tech	PK	Roschon Johnson	Texas	RB
Week 7 (Oct. 14)	CeeDee Lamb	Oklahoma	WR	Kenneth Murray	Oklahoma	LB	John Mayers (2)	Baylor	PK	Breece Hall; Jalen Hurts (3)	Iowa State; Oklahoma	RB; QB
Week 8 (Oct. 21)	Jalen Hurts (2)	Oklahoma	QB	Terrel Bernard	Baylor	LB	Cameron Dicker	Texas	PK	Breece Hall (2)	Iowa State	RB
Week 9 (Oct. 28)	Carter Stanley	Kansas	QB	Malcolm Rodriguez	Oklahoma State	DB	Liam Jones	Kansas	PK	Max Duggan	TCU	QB
Week 10 (Nov. 4)	Chuba Hubbard (3)	Oklahoma State	RB	Kolby Harvell-Peel (2)	Oklahoma State	S	Bravvion Roy	Baylor	DT	Spencer Sanders (2)	Oklahoma State	QB
Week 11 (Nov. 11)	CeeDee Lamb (2)	Oklahoma	WR	Terrel Bernard (2)	Baylor	LB	John Mayers (2)	Baylor	PK	Sam James (2)	West Virginia	WR
Week 12 (Nov. 18)	Jalen Hurts (3)	Oklahoma	QB	Kolby Harvell-Peel (3)	Oklahoma State	S	Connor Assalley	Texas Tech	PK	Jarret Doege	West Virginia	QB
Week 13 (Nov. 25)	Brock Purdy (2)	Iowa State	QB	James Lynch	Baylor	DT	Joshua Youngblood	Kansas State	WR/KR	Dru Brown	Oklahoma State	QB
Week 14 (Dec. 2)	Devin Duvernay (2)	Texas	WR	Parnell Motley	Oklahoma	CB	Joshua Youngblood (2)	Kansas State	WR/KR	Roschon Johnson (2)	Texas	RB

=== Big 12 Individual Awards ===
The following individuals received postseason honors as voted by the Big 12 Conference football coaches at the end of the season.

Award	Player	School
Offensive Player of the Year	Chuba Hubbard, RB, Sophomore	Oklahoma State
Defensive Player of the Year	James Lynch, DL, Junior	Baylor
Special Teams Player of the Year	Joshua Youngblood, WR/PR, Freshman	Kansas State
Offensive Freshman of the Year	Spencer Sanders, QB	Oklahoma State
Offensive lineman of the Year	Creed Humphrey, Sophomore; Colton McKivitz, Senior	Oklahoma; West Virginia
Defensive Freshman of the Year	Ar'Darius Washington, DB	TCU
Defensive lineman of the Year	James Lynch, DL, Junior	Baylor
Offensive Newcomer of the Year	Jalen Hurts, QB, Senior	Oklahoma
Defensive Newcomer of the Year	LaRon Stokes, DL, Junior	Oklahoma
Coach of the Year	Matt Rhule	Baylor

=== All-conference teams ===
Position	Player	Team
First Team Offense
FB	Nick Lenners, So.	Kansas State
OL	Julian Good-Jones, Sr.	Iowa State
OL	Hakeem Adeniji, Sr.	Kansas
OL	Creed Humphrey, So.	Oklahoma
OL	Zach Shackelford, Sr.	Texas
OL	Colton McKivitz, Sr.	West Virginia
QB	Jalen Hurts, Sr.	Oklahoma
RB	Pooka Williams Jr., So.	Kansas
RB	Chuba Hubbard, So.	Oklahoma State
TE	Charlie Kolar, So.	Iowa State
WR	Denzel Mims, Sr.	Baylor
WR	*CeeDee Lamb, Jr.	Oklahoma
WR	Devin Duvernay, Sr.	Texas
First Team Defense
DB	Greg Eisworth, Jr.	Iowa State
DB	Kolby Harvell-Peel, So.	Oklahoma State
DB	Jeff Gladney, Sr.	TCU
DB	Trevon Moehrig, So.	TCU
DB	Douglas Coleman, Sr.	Texas Tech
DL	*James Lynch, Jr.	Baylor
DL	Bravvion Roy, Sr.	Baylor
DL	Wyatt Hubert, So.	Kansas State
DL	Ross Blacklock, Jr.	TCU
DL	Darius Stills	West Virginia
LB	Kenneth Murray, Jr.	Oklahoma
LB	Garret Wallow, Jr.	TCU
LB	Jordyn Brooks, Sr.	Texas Tech
First Team Special Teams
PK	Jonathan Song, Sr.	TCU
P	Austin McNamara, Fr.	Texas Tech
RS	Joshua Youngblood, Fr.	Kansas State

Position	Player	Team
Second Team Offense
FB	Koby Bullard, Jr.	Baylor
OL	Sam Tecklenburg, Sr.	Baylor
OL	Scott Frantz, Sr.	Kansas State
OL	Adrian Ealy, So.	Oklahoma
OL	Sam Cosmi, So.	Texas
OL	Travis Bruffy, Sr.	Texas Tech
QB	Brock Purdy, So.	Iowa State
RB	Breece Hall, Fr.	Iowa State
RB	Kennedy Brooks, So.	Oklahoma
TE	Chase Allen, Jr.	Iowa State
TE	Pro Wells, So.	TCU
WR	Jeremiah Hall, So.	Oklahoma
WR	Deshaunte Jones, Sr.	Iowa State
WR	Tylan Wallace, Jr.	Oklahoma State
WR	Jalen Reagor, Jr.	TCU
Second Team Defense
DB	Grayland Arnold, Jr.	Baylor
DB	Chris Miller, Sr.	Baylor
DB	Parnell Motley, Sr.	Oklahoma
DB	Brandon Jones, Sr.	Texas
DB	Josh Norwood, Sr.	West Virginia
DB	Keith Washington, Sr.	West Virginia
DL	Ray Lima, Sr.	Iowa State
DL	Neville Gallimore, Sr.	Oklahoma
DL	Ronnie Perkins, So.	Oklahoma
DL	Eli Howard, Jr.	Texas Tech
DL	Dante Stills, So.	West Virginia
LB	Terrel Bernard, So.	Baylor
LB	Clay Johnston, Sr.	Baylor
LB	Amen Ogbongbemiga, Jr.	Oklahoma State
LB	Malcolm Rodriguez, Jr.	Oklahoma State
Second Team Special Teams
PK	Gabe Brkic, Fr.	Oklahoma
P	Devin Anctil, Sr.	Kansas State
RS	Jalen Reagor, Jr.	TCU

*Denotes Unanimous Selection

All Conference Honorable Mentions:

- Baylor: Charlie Brewer (QB & OPoY), JaMycal Hasty (RB), Jameson Houston (DB), James Lockhart (DL), Blake Lynch (LB), Xavier Newman-Johnson (OL), Tyquan Thornton (WR)
- Iowa State: Trevor Downing (OL), Julian Good-Jones (OLoY), Breece Hall (OFoY), Anthony Johnson (DB), Jamahl Johnson (DL), Josh Knipfel (OL), Tayvonn Kyle (DFoY), La’Michael Pettway (WR & ONoY), Brock Purdy (OPoY), Mike Rose (LB), Dylan Soehner (FB), Marcel Spears Jr. (LB), Eyioma Uwazurike (DL), O’Rien Vance (LB), Lawrence White (DB), Steven Wirtel (STPoY)
- Kansas: Hakeem Adeniji (OLoY), Jelani Brown (DL), Hasan Defense (DB), Azur Kamara (DL), Mike Lee (DB), Ben Miles (FB), Andrew Parchment (WR & ONoY), Gavin Potter (DFoY), Kyle Thompson (P)
- K-State: James Gilbert (RB), Denzel Goolsby (DB), Adam Holtorf (OL), Wyatt Hubert (DPoY & DLoY), Nick Kaltmayer (OL), Malik Knowles (OFoY), Blake Lynch (PK), A. J. Parker(DB), Dalton Schoen (WR), Elijah Sullivan (LB), Skylar Thompson (QB), Reggie Walker (DL)
- Oklahoma: Gabe Brkic (STPoY), Pat Fields (DB), Neville Gallimore (DLoY), Jalen Hurts (OPoY), CeeDee Lamb (KR/PR & OPoY), Reeves Mundschau (P), Kenneth Murray (DPoY), Jalen Redmond (DL & DFoY), Delarrin Turner-Yell (DB), DaShaun White (LB)
- Oklahoma State: Matt Ammendola (PK & STPoY), Israel Antwine (DL & DNoY), Trace Ford (DL & DFoY), A. J. Green (DB), Kolby Harvell-Peel (DPoY), Tom Hutton (P), Teven Jenkins (OL), Marcus Keyes (OL), Tre Sterling (DB), Dillon Stoner (WR & KR/PR), Johnny Wilson (OL), Jelani Woods (TE)
- TCU: Darius Anderson (RB), Taye Barber (WR), Corey Bethley (DL), Ross Blacklock (DLoY), Max Duggan (OFoY), Cordel Iwuagwu (OL), Jonathan Song (STPoY), Garret Wallow (DPoY)
- Texas: Parker Braun (ONoY), Sam Cosmi (OLoY), Cameron Dicker (PK), Devin Duvernay (OPoY), Sam Ehlinger (QB), Joseph Ossai (LB), Malcolm Roach (DL)
- Texas Tech: Jordyn Brooks (DPoY), Dawson Deaton (OL), DaMarcus Fields (DB), Riko Jeffers (LB), Terence Steele (OL), Donta Thompson (TE), SaRodorick Thompson (RB), RJ Turner (ONoY), Broderick Washington Jr. (DL), Trey Wolff (PK)
- West Virginia: Josh Chandler (LB), Josh Growden (STPoY), Sam James (WR & OFoY), Tykee Smith (DFoY), Darius Stills (DLoY)

=== All-Americans ===
The 2019 College Football All-America Teams are composed of the following College Football All-American first teams chosen by the following selector organizations: Associated Press (AP), Football Writers Association of America (FWAA), American Football Coaches Association (AFCA), Walter Camp Foundation (WCFF), The Sporting News (TSN), Sports Illustrated (SI), USA Today (USAT) ESPN, CBS Sports (CBS), FOX Sports (FOX) College Football News (CFN), Bleacher Report (BR), Scout.com, Phil Steele (PS), SB Nation (SB), Athlon Sports, Pro Football Focus (PFF) and Yahoo! Sports (Yahoo!).

Currently, the NCAA compiles consensus all-America teams in the sports of Division I-FBS football and Division I men's basketball using a point system computed from All-America teams named by coaches associations or media sources. The system consists of three points for a first-team honor, two points for second-team honor, and one point for third-team honor. Honorable mention and fourth team or lower recognitions are not accorded any points. Football consensus teams are compiled by position and the player accumulating the most points at each position is named first team consensus all-American. Currently, the NCAA recognizes All-Americans selected by the AP, AFCA, FWAA, TSN, and the WCFF to determine Consensus and Unanimous All-Americans. Any player named to the First Team by all five of the NCAA-recognized selectors is deemed a Unanimous All-American.

Position	Player	School	Selector	Unanimous	Consensus
First Team All-Americans
RB	Chuba Hubbard	Oklahoma State	AFCA, AP, TSN, WCFF		✓
WR	CeeDee Lamb	Oklahoma	AFCA, AP, TSN, WCFF		✓
DL	James Lynch	Baylor	AFCA, AP, FWAA, TSN, WCFF	✓	✓

Position	Player	School	Selector	Unanimous	Consensus
Second Team All-Americans
LB	Jordyn Brooks	Texas Tech	AFCA, AP, FWAA, WCFF		✓
DB	Jeff Gladney	TCU	FWAA		
C	Creed Humphrey	Oklahoma	AP, TSN, WCFF		✓
QB	Jalen Hurts	Oklahoma	TSN		
TE	Charlie Kolar	Iowa State	FWAA		
OL	Colton McKivitz	West Virginia	WCFF		
LB	Kenneth Murray	Oklahoma	FWAA		
PR	Jalen Reagor	TCU	FWAA		
KR	Joshua Youngblood	Kansas State	FWAA		

Position	Player	School	Selector	Unanimous	Consensus
Third Team All-Americans
DL	Neville Gallimore	Oklahoma	AP		
QB	Jalen Hurts	Oklahoma	AP		
TE	Charlie Kolar	Iowa State	AP		
OL	Colton McKivitz	West Virginia	AP		
LB	Kenneth Murray	Oklahoma	AP		

Position	Player	School	Selector	Unanimous	Consensus
Fourth Team All-Americans

*AFCA All-America Team (AFCA)
*Walter Camp Football Foundation All-America Team (WCFF)
*Associated Press All-America Team (AP)
*The Sporting News All-America Team (TSN)
*Football Writers Association of America All-America Team (FWAA)
*Sports Illustrated All-America Team (SI)
*Bleacher Report All-America Team (BR)
*College Football News All-America Team (CFN)
*ESPN All-America Team (ESPN)
*CBS Sports All-America Team (CBS)
*Athlon Sports All-America Team (Athlon)

=== National award winners ===
2019 College Football Award Winners

== Home game attendance ==
Team	Stadium	Capacity	Game 1	Game 2	Game 3	Game 4	Game 5	Game 6	Game 7	Total	Average	% of Capacity
Baylor	McLane Stadium	45,140	43,013	40,274	42,359	**47,264**	**46,379**	**50,223**‡	**49,109**	318,621	45,517	100.84%
Iowa State	Jack Trice Stadium	61,500	61,500†	61,500†	57,442	59,553	61,500†	58,946	58,120	418,561	59,794	97.23%
Kansas	Memorial Stadium	50,071	32,611	33,493	35,816	34,402	31,036	47,223†	22,531	237,112	33,873	67.65%
Kansas State	Bill Snyder Family Stadium	53,000	51,189†	46,075	50,448	48,298	50,394	46,332	48,990	341,726	48,818	92.11%
Oklahoma	Gaylord Family Oklahoma Memorial Stadium	86,112	84,534†	82,181	84,416		82,620	83,541	82,241	499,533	83,256	96.68%
Oklahoma State	Boone Pickens Stadium	55,509	55,509†	55,509†	55,060	55,509†	55,509†	55,509†		332,605	55,434	99.87%
TCU	Amon G. Carter Stadium	45,000	40,422	41,250	41,960	**47,660**†	**45,870**	40,126		257,378	42,896	95.33%
Texas	Darrell K Royal–Texas Memorial Stadium	100,119	93,418	98,763†	96,936		97,137	97,883	93,747	577,844	96,314	96.13%
Texas Tech	Jones AT&T Stadium	60,454	54,183	56,957†	56,479	52,315	50,459	50,177		320,570	53,428	88.38%
West Virginia	Mountaineer Field	60,000	**61,891**	57,052	**62,069**†	51,836	56,573	46,022		335,443	55,907	93.18%

Bold – Exceed capacity
†Season High
‡ Record Stadium Attendance

== NFL draft ==
The following list includes all Big 12 players who were drafted in the 2020 NFL draft.

Round #	Pick #	NFL team	Player	Position	College
1	17	Dallas Cowboys	CeeDee Lamb	WR	Oklahoma
1	21	Philadelphia Eagles	Jalen Reagor	WR	TCU
1	23	Los Angeles Chargers	Kenneth Murray	LB	Oklahoma
1	27	Seattle Seahawks	Jordyn Brooks	LB	Texas Tech
1	31	Minnesota Vikings	Jeff Gladney	CB	TCU
2	40	Houston Texans	Ross Blacklock	DT	TCU
2	53	Philadelphia Eagles	Jalen Hurts	QB	Oklahoma
2	59	New York Jets	Denzel Mims	WR	Baylor
3	70	Miami Dolphins	Brandon Jones	S	Texas
3	82	Dallas Cowboys	Neville Gallimore	DT	Oklahoma
3	92	Baltimore Ravens	Devin Duvernay	WR	Texas
3	96	Kansas City Chiefs	Lucas Niang	OT	TCU
4	130	Minnesota Vikings	James Lynch	DT	Baylor
5	152	Carolina Panthers	Kenny Robinson	S	West Virginia
5	153	San Francisco 49ers	Colton McKivitz	OT	West Virginia
5	165	Jacksonville Jaguars	Collin Johnson	WR	Texas
5	170	Baltimore Ravens	Broderick Washington	DT	Texas Tech
6	180	Cincinnati Bengals	Hakeem Adeniji	OT	Kansas
6	184	Carolina Panthers	Bravvion Roy	DT	Baylor
7	234	Los Angeles Rams	Clay Johnston	LB	Baylor
7	236	Green Bay Packers	Vernon Scott	FS	TCU
