= Chuba Hubbard =

Canadian football player (born 1999)

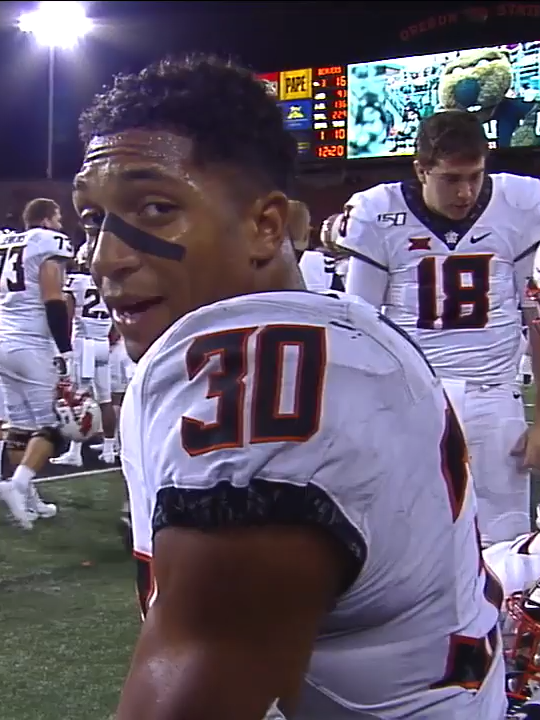
- Hubbard with the Oklahoma State Cowboys in 2019

No. 30 – Carolina Panthers
- Position: Running back
- Roster status: Active

Personal information
- Born: June 11, 1999 (age 27); Edmonton, Alberta, Canada
- Listed height: 6 ft 1 in (1.85 m)
- Listed weight: 216 lb (98 kg)

Career information
- High school: Bev Facey (Sherwood Park, Alberta)
- College: Oklahoma State (2017–2020)
- NFL draft: 2021: 4th round, 126th overall pick
- CFL draft: 2021: 5th round, 43rd overall pick

Career history
- Carolina Panthers (2021–present)

Awards and highlights
- Unanimous All-American (2019); NCAA rushing yards leader (2019); Jon Cornish Trophy (2019); Big 12 Offensive Player of the Year (2019); First-team All-Big 12 (2019); Second-team All-Big 12 (2020)

Career NFL statistics as of Week 8, 2026
- Rushing attempts: 1,007
- Rushing yards: 4,226
- Rushing touchdowns: 28
- Receptions: 173
- Receiving yards: 1,122
- Receiving touchdowns: 7
- Stats at Pro Football Reference

Chuba Robert-Shamar Hubbard (CHOO-bə; born June 11, 1999) is a Canadian professional football running back for the Carolina Panthers of the National Football League (NFL). He played college football for the Oklahoma State Cowboys, where he was a unanimous All-American, named the Big 12 Offensive Player of the Year and won the Jon Cornish Trophy in 2019. Hubbard was selected by the Panthers in the fourth round of the 2021 NFL draft.

== Early life ==
Born in Edmonton, Alberta, to a Nigerian father and Canadian mother, Hubbard later moved to Sherwood Park, and attended Bev Facey Community High School, where he played Canadian football. During his three years, he rushed for 6,880 yards on 458 attempts with 82 touchdowns. He committed to Oklahoma State University to play college football in the United States.

== College career ==
After redshirting his first year at Oklahoma State in 2017, Hubbard played in 13 games in 2018 and had 740 rushing yards on 124 carries with seven touchdowns. He returned as Oklahoma State's starting running back in 2019 and had a stellar year rushing for an NCAA-leading 2,094 yards on 328 carries and 21 touchdowns. Despite speculation that he would declare for the 2020 NFL draft after this season, Hubbard announced that he would return to school for his redshirt junior year. He was awarded the Jon Cornish Trophy as the top Canadian in NCAA football for the season.

In June 2020, Hubbard threatened to boycott the football team and any affiliation with the university after a photo surfaced showing Oklahoma State head coach Mike Gundy wearing a T-shirt promoting the One America News Network (OAN), a far right news channel. Gundy subsequently issued an apology, saying he was disgusted by OAN's coverage of the Black Lives Matter movement. Hubbard eventually apologized for the way he handled the situation.

== Professional career ==
Pre-draft measurables
Height	Weight	Arm length	Hand span	Wingspan	40-yard dash	10-yard split	20-yard split	20-yard shuttle	Three-cone drill	Vertical jump	Broad jump	Bench press
6 ft 0 in (1.83 m)	210 lb (95 kg)	32 in (0.81 m)	9 in (0.23 m)	6 ft 3 3/4 in (1.92 m)	4.51 s	1.56 s	2.61 s	4.30 s	7.28 s	36.0 in (0.91 m)	10 ft 0 in (3.05 m)	20 reps
All values from Pro Day

Hubbard was selected by the Carolina Panthers in the fourth round (126th overall) of the 2021 NFL draft. He was also selected by the Calgary Stampeders in the fifth round (43rd overall) of the 2021 CFL draft before signing a four-year contract, worth $4.2 million, with the Panthers on May 6, 2021. Hubbard made his NFL debut in Week 1 of the 2021 season against the New York Jets. In Week 5, against the Philadelphia Eagles, he had 24 carries for 101 rushing yards in the 21–18 loss. He finished the 2021 season with 172 carries for 612 rushing yards and five rushing touchdowns to go along with 25 receptions for 174 receiving yards and one receiving touchdown in 17 games and ten starts.

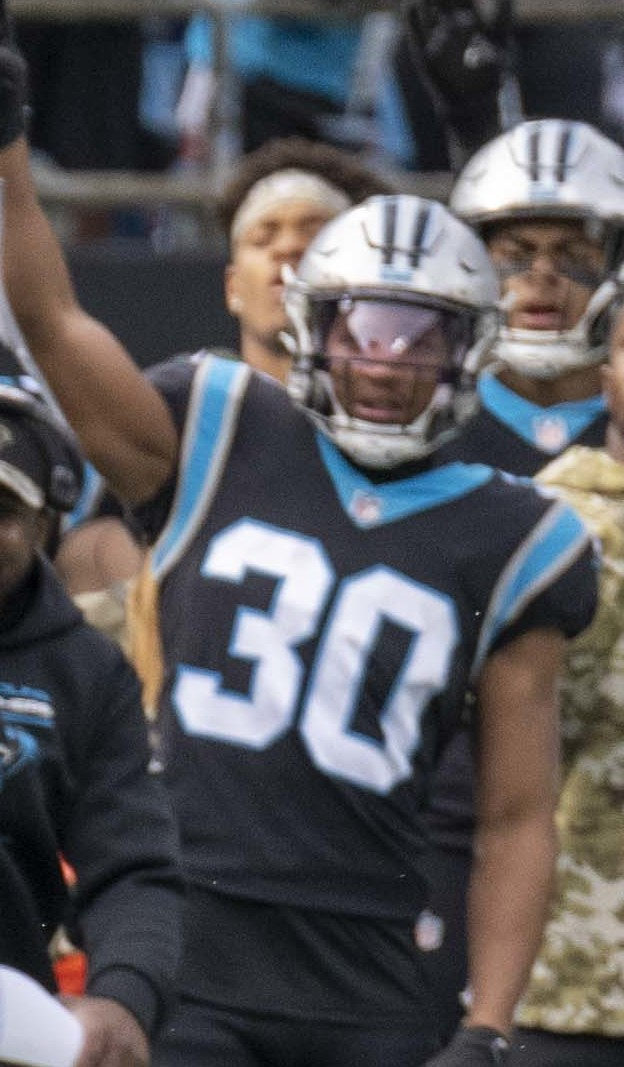
Hubbard with the Panthers in 2021

In Week 16 of the 2022 season, Hubbard had 12 carries for 125 rushing yards in a 37–23 victory over the Detroit Lions. He finished the 2022 season with 95 carries for 466 rushing yards and two rushing touchdowns to go along with 14 receptions for 171 receiving yards in 15 games and two starts.

At the beginning of the 2023 season, Hubbard was listed as second on the depth chart behind new addition Miles Sanders. In Week 1, Hubbard recorded nine carries for 60 yards. Hubbard assumed the starting position in Week 6 against the Miami Dolphins when Sanders was ruled out and carried the ball nineteen times for 88 yards and a touchdown, the best performance by a Panthers running back in the season. Despite Sanders' return, Hubbard continued in the starting role. In Week 12 against the Tennessee Titans, Hubbard had 14 carries for 45 yards and a touchdown, as well as reeling in 5 catches for 47 yards as the Panthers went on to lose 17–10. The following week against the Tampa Bay Buccaneers, Hubbard ran 25 times for 104 yards and 2 touchdowns in the 21–18 loss. In the Panthers' Week 17 loss to the Jacksonville Jaguars, Hubbard reached 1,000 scrimmage yards for the first time in his NFL career.

On November 7, 2024, the Panthers signed Hubbard to a four-year, $33.2 million extension, with $15 million guaranteed. In the Panthers' Week 12 loss to the Kansas City Chiefs, Hubbard reached 1,000 scrimmage yards for the second straight season. In Week 16, Hubbard ran for 152 yards and two touchdowns in a 36-30 overtime win over the Arizona Cardinals, earning NFC Offensive Player of the Week. On December 28, Hubbard was place on injured reserve with knee and calf injuries, ending his season. In 15 starts for Carolina, he totaled 1,195 rushing yards, 171 receiving yards and 11 touchdowns.

Hubbard began the 2025 season as the Panthers starting running back. He suffered a calf injury in Week 4 and missed the next two games, during which his replacement Rico Dowdle rushed for nearly 400 yards. The two backs split time upon Hubbard's return, however Dowdle eventually took over as the lead back, relegating Hubbard to a backup role. He finished the season with 511 rushing yards and one touchdown, along with 30 catches for 223 yards and three touchdowns. He scored two touchdowns in the Panthers' Wild Card Round 34–31 loss to the Rams.

== Career statistics ==
=== NFL ===
Legend
**Bold**	Career high

Season	Team	Games		Rushing					Receiving					Fumbles	
Season	Team	GP	GS	Att	Yds	Avg	Lng	TD	Rec	Yds	Avg	Lng	TD	Fum	Lost
2021	CAR	**17**	10	172	612	3.6	26	5	25	174	7.0	33	1	1	1
2022	CAR	15	2	95	466	**4.9**	35	2	14	171	**12.2**	**45**	0	2	1
2023	CAR	**17**	12	238	902	3.8	22	5	39	233	6.0	25	0	1	0
2024	CAR	15	**15**	**250**	**1,195**	4.8	**38**	**10**	**43**	171	4.0	20	1	**4**	**3**
2025	CAR	15	6	134	511	3.8	14	1	30	223	7.4	35	**3**	1	1
2026	CAR	9	9	161	711	4.4	32	7	31	**247**	8.0	34	2	1	0
Career		82	48	930	3,870	4.2	38	30	160	1,049	6.6	45	7	10	6

=== College ===
Legend
	Led the NCAA
**Bold**	Career high

Year	Team	GP	Rushing				Receiving				Scrimmage			
Year	Team	GP	Att	Yds	Avg	TD	Rec	Yds	Avg	TD	Touch	Yds	Avg	TD
2017	Oklahoma State	0	Redshirt											
2018	Oklahoma State	13	124	740	6.0	7	22	**229**	**10.4**	**2**	146	969	**6.6**	9
2019	Oklahoma State	13	**328**	**2,094**	**6.4**	**21**	**23**	198	8.6	0	**351**	**2,292**	6.5	**21**
2020	Oklahoma State	7	133	625	4.7	5	8	52	6.5	1	141	677	4.8	6
Career		33	585	3,459	5.9	33	53	479	9.0	3	638	3,938	6.2	36
