= Creed Humphrey =

American football player (born 1999)

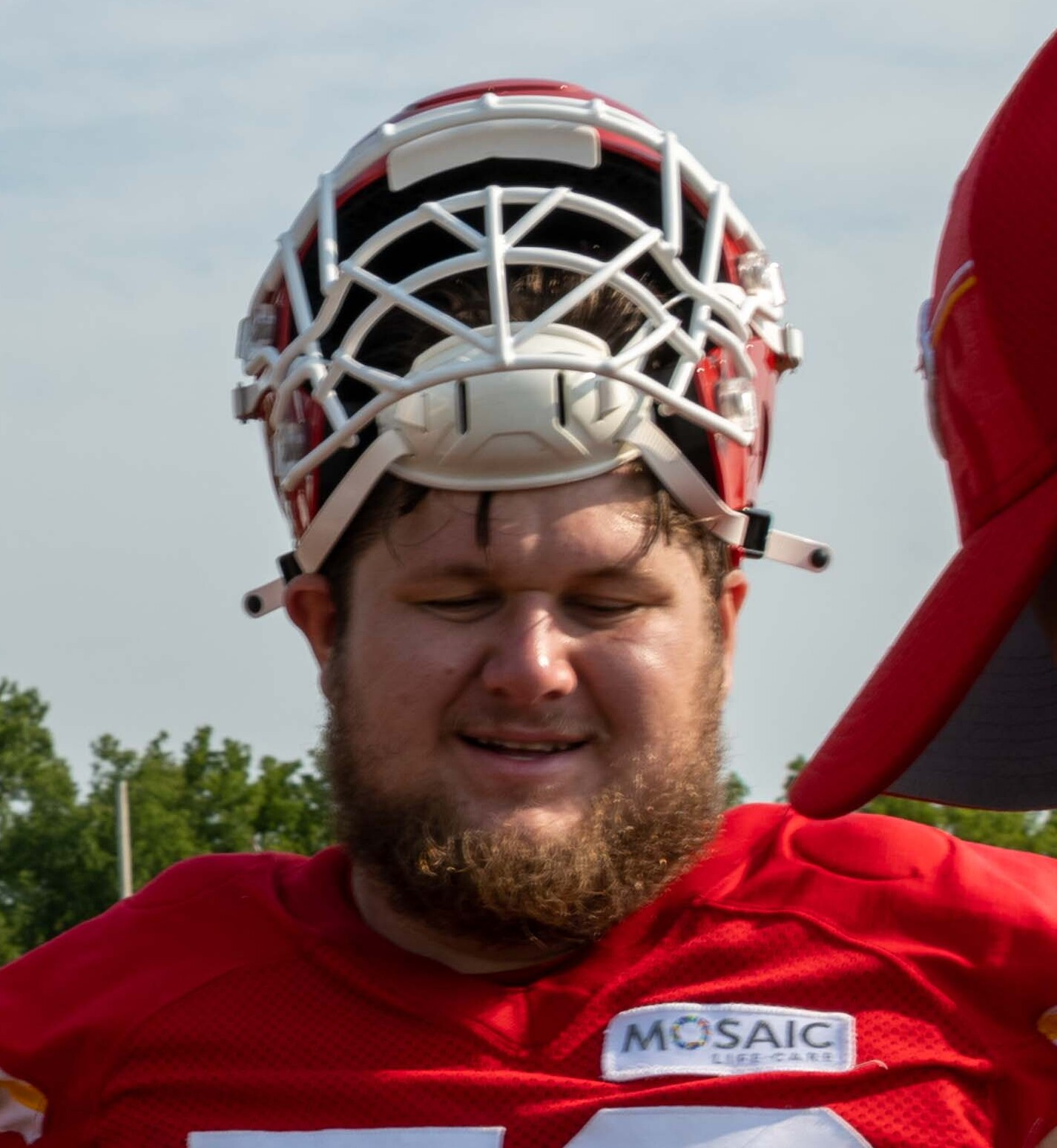
- Humphrey in 2022

No. 52 – Kansas City Chiefs
- Position: Center
- Roster status: Active

Personal information
- Born: June 28, 1999 (age 27); Shawnee, Oklahoma, U.S.
- Listed height: 6 ft 4 in (1.93 m)
- Listed weight: 302 lb (137 kg)

Career information
- High school: Shawnee (OK)
- College: Oklahoma (2017–2020)
- NFL draft: 2021: 2nd round, 63rd overall pick

Career history
- Kansas City Chiefs (2021–present)

Awards and highlights
- 2× Super Bowl champion (LVII, LVIII); 2× First-team All-Pro (2024, 2025); Second-team All-Pro (2022); 4× Pro Bowl (2022–2025); PFWA All-Rookie Team (2021); Third-team All-American (2020); 2× Big 12 Offensive Lineman of the Year (2019, 2020); 2× First-team All-Big 12 (2019, 2020); Second-team All-Big 12 (2018)

Career NFL statistics as of Week 4, 2026
- Games played: 89
- Games started: 89
- Stats at Pro Football Reference

Creed Humphrey (born June 28, 1999) is an American professional football center for the Kansas City Chiefs of the National Football League (NFL). He played college football for the Oklahoma Sooners, where he was named the Big 12 Conference's offensive lineman of the year in 2019 and 2020. He was selected by the Chiefs in the second round of the 2021 NFL draft.

== Early life ==
Humphrey attended the Shawnee High School in Shawnee, Oklahoma. He played both center and defensive line on the football team. Humphrey played in the 2017 U.S. Army All-American Game. Humphrey was a highly-touted prospect, with a four-star rating from 247Sports. He was ranked 294th overall in his recruiting class, but was the 5th-best prospect from the State of Oklahoma and the 3rd-best center in the country.

Humphrey received nineteen scholarship offers from programs like Alabama, Texas A&M, Texas, Oklahoma State, Oklahoma, Vanderbilt, and Virginia Tech. He initially committed to Texas A&M in June 2016 but decommitted two months later and signed a National Letter of Intent with Oklahoma. He is Indigenous Potawatomi, and is a member of the Citizen Potawatomi Nation.

== College career ==
Humphrey redshirted his first year at Oklahoma in 2017. He played in all 14 games with 12 starts in 2018. He returned as the starting center for Oklahoma in 2019 and 2020, being named the Big 12 Conference's offensive lineman of the year in both seasons. Following the 2020 season Humphrey announced he would be forgoing his final year of eligibility and declared for the 2021 NFL draft.

== Professional career ==
Pre-draft measurables
Height	Weight	Arm length	Hand span	Wingspan	40-yard dash	10-yard split	20-yard split	20-yard shuttle	Three-cone drill	Vertical jump	Broad jump	Bench press
6 ft 4 1/4 in (1.94 m)	302 lb (137 kg)	32 1/4 in (0.82 m)	9 1/2 in (0.24 m)	6 ft 6 1/4 in (1.99 m)	5.11 s	1.71 s	2.90 s	4.49 s	7.50 s	33.0 in (0.84 m)	9 ft 4 in (2.84 m)	29 reps
All values from Pro Day

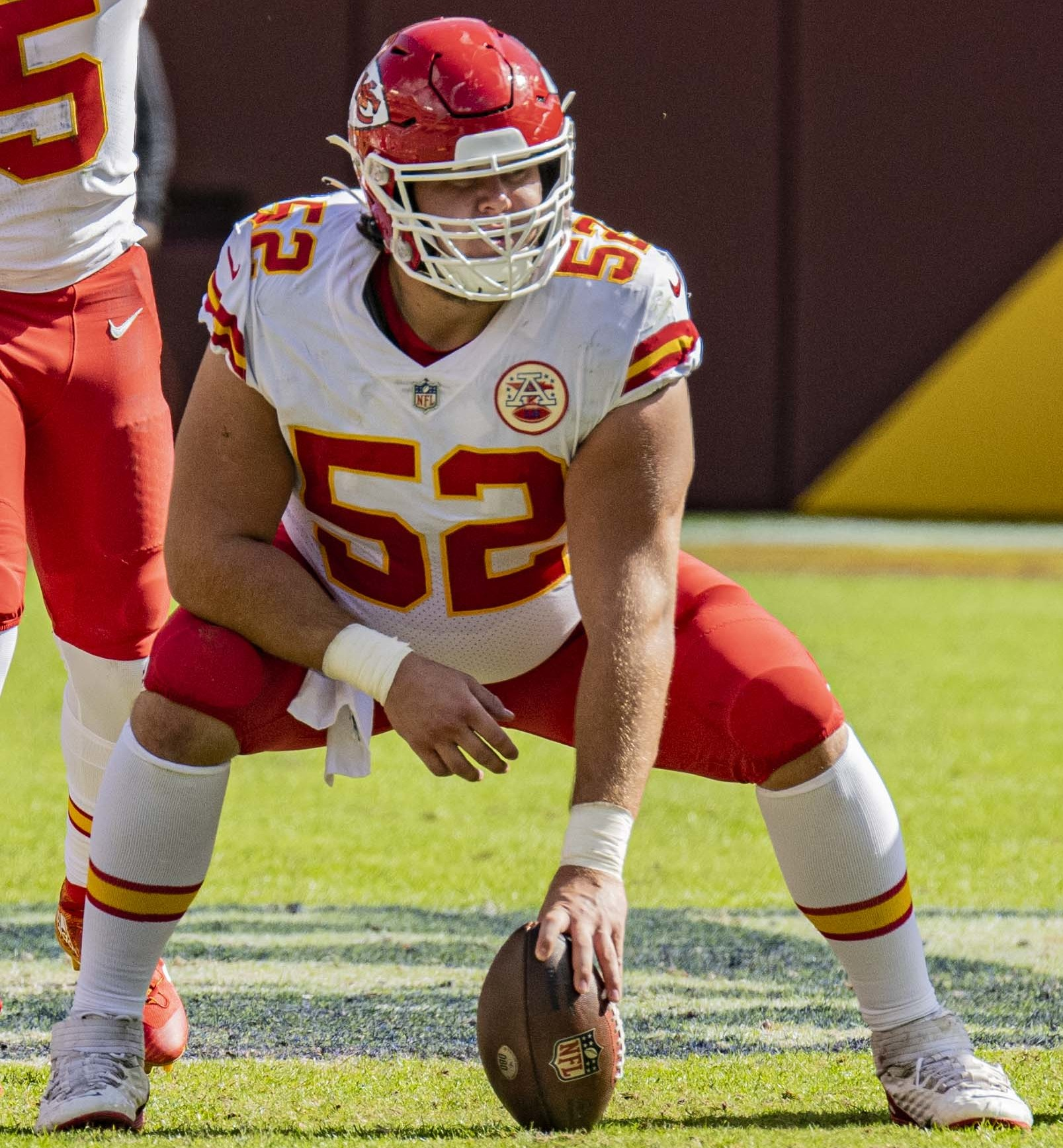
Humphrey with the Kansas City Chiefs in 2021

Humphrey was selected by the Kansas City Chiefs in the second round (63rd overall) of the 2021 NFL draft. On May 13, 2021, he signed his rookie contract with the Chiefs. He made his first career start in the Chiefs week 1 game against the Cleveland Browns. On November 3, 2021, the midway point of the 2021 season, Pro Football Focus named Humphrey to their mid-season All-Rookie and All-Pro teams. He was named to the PFWA All-Rookie team. In the 2022 season, Humphrey started in all 17 regular season games. He helped the Chiefs win Super Bowl LVII against the Philadelphia Eagles 38–35, by anchoring the offensive line that allowed no sacks during the game.

In the 2023 season, Humphrey helped the Chiefs win Super Bowl LVIII against the San Francisco 49ers 25–22 being the first team since the Patriots in 2003 and 2004 to repeat as Super Bowl champions.

On August 22, 2024, Humphrey signed a four-year contract extension worth $72 million, $50 million of which was guaranteed. This new deal made him the highest-paid center in the NFL. In 2024, Humphrey helped the Chiefs reach Super Bowl LIX but lost 40–22 to the Eagles. From 2022 to 2024, he led all centers in pass block win rate at 97.6%. Humphrey was ranked 93rd by his fellow players on the NFL Top 100 Players of 2025, and 94th the following season.
