= Kent Johnston =

American football coach (born 1956)

Personal information
- Born: February 21, 1956 (age 70)

Career information
- College: Stephen F. Austin State

Career history
- Strength and conditioning coach: Northwestern State University (1979–1980); Northeast Louisiana University (1980–1981); University of Alabama (1983–1986); Tampa Bay Buccaneers (1987–1991); Green Bay Packers (1992–1998); Seattle Seahawks (1999–2003); University of Alabama (2004–2005); Cleveland Browns (2010–2012); San Diego Chargers (2013–2016); Baylor University (2017–2019); Director of Player Wellness: Carolina Panthers (2020–2022)

Allen Kent Johnston (born February 21, 1956) is an American football coach.

== Career ==
Johnston served as an assistant coach at Northwestern State University from 1979 to 1980, the Northeast Louisiana University from 1980 to 1981, and the University of Alabama from 1983 to 1986. He served as Strength and Conditioning Coach of the Tampa Bay Buccaneers from 1987 to 1991, the Green Bay Packers from 1992 to 1998, and the Seattle Seahawks from 1999 to 2003 before returning to the University of Alabama. Later he was hired as the Strength and Conditioning Coach of the Cleveland Browns. In 2013 Johnston was hired as the Strength and Conditioning Coach of the San Diego Chargers. After leaving the Chargers, he worked at Baylor and performed Return to Play services for injured players from 2017-2019. In 2020 he joined the Carolina Panthers for two years as the Director of Player Wellness before retiring from the NFL in 2022. In 1997 while with the Packers he was named Strength and Conditioning Coach of the Year. In 2005 Johnston was inducted into the Strength and Conditioning Hall of Fame.

== Personal life ==
Kent is married to his Pam. They have four sons, Kody, Kole, Clay and Cade. His third son, Clay, went on to play football as an inside linebacker in college and the NFL. Kody played college football at Texas A&M University and Kole played at Tarleton State University. Kent is now working with Aruka performance.
