= James Lynch (American football) =

American football player (born 1999)

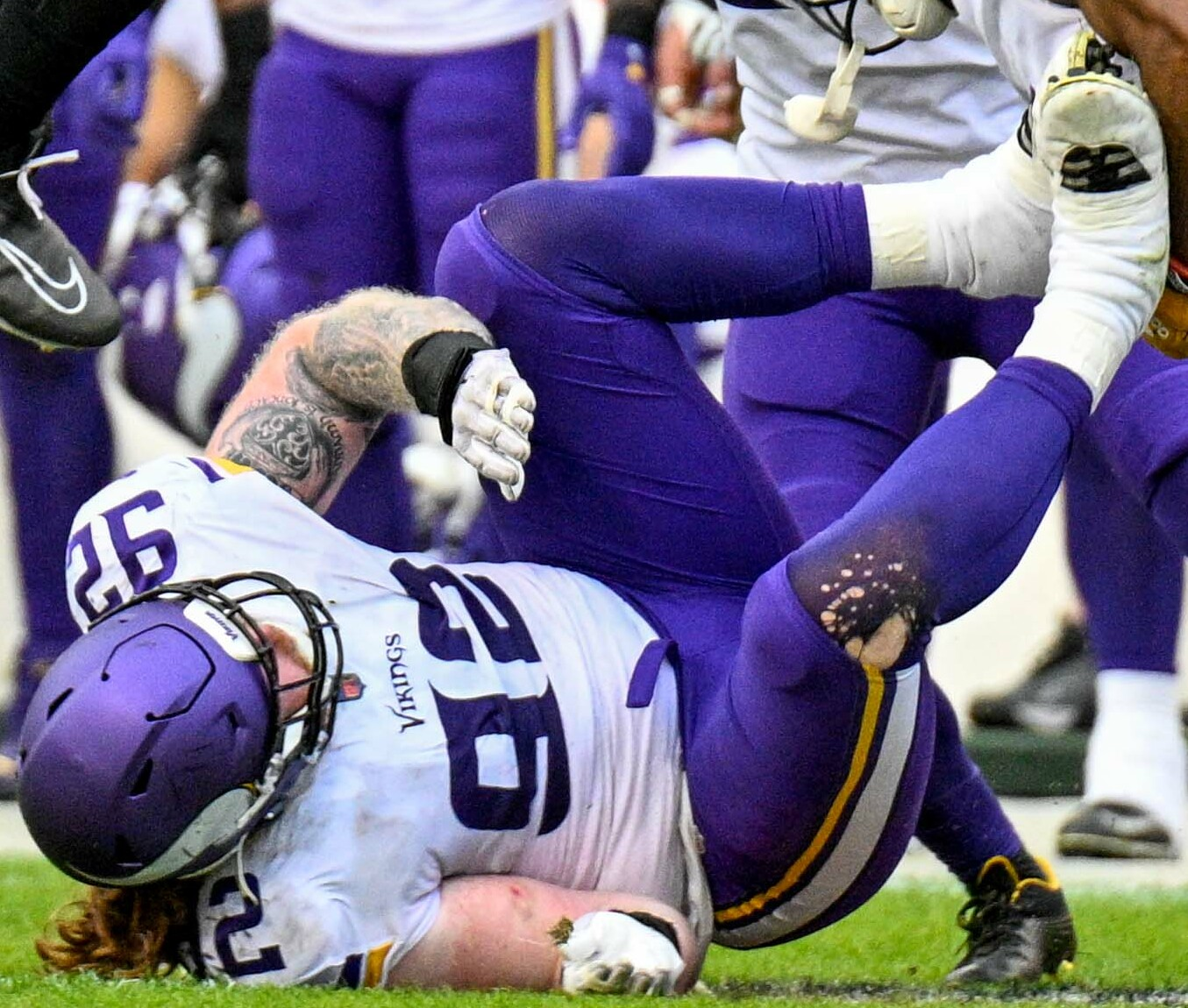
- Lynch with the Minnesota Vikings in 2022

No. 97 – Chicago Bears
- Position: Nose tackle
- Roster status: Active

Personal information
- Born: January 20, 1999 (age 27); Round Rock, Texas, U.S.
- Listed height: 6 ft 4 in (1.93 m)
- Listed weight: 295 lb (134 kg)

Career information
- High school: Round Rock
- College: Baylor (2017–2019)
- NFL draft: 2020: 4th round, 130th overall pick

Career history
- Minnesota Vikings (2020–2023); Tennessee Titans (2024–2025); Chicago Bears (2026–present)

Awards and highlights
- Unanimous All-American (2019); Big 12 Defensive Player of the Year (2019); Big 12 Defensive Lineman of the Year (2019); First team All-Big 12 (2019)

Career NFL statistics as of 2025
- Total tackles: 98
- Sacks: 3.5
- Fumble recoveries: 1
- Pass deflections: 3
- Stats at Pro Football Reference

James Husker Lynch (born January 20, 1999) is an American professional football nose tackle for the Chicago Bears of the National Football League (NFL). He played college football at Baylor and was drafted by the Minnesota Vikings in the fourth round of the 2020 NFL draft. He has also played for the Tennessee Titans.

== Early life ==
Lynch grew up in Round Rock, Texas and attended Round Rock High School, playing defensive line and punter on the school's football team. He was named the District 13-6A lineman of the year in each of his final two high school seasons. As a senior, Lynch recorded 46 tackles, 14 tackles for loss, 8 sacks, 3 pass breakups, 3 fumbles recoveries and a forced fumble and punted 27 times for an average of 43.7 yards. He initially committed to play college football at Texas Christian before switching his commitment to USC. Lynch de-committed again during his senior year before deciding to play at Baylor.

== College career ==
Lynch played in 11 games during his true freshman season as a member of the Bears' defensive tackle rotation and was named a Freshman All-American by ESPN after making 20 tackles (five for loss), three sacks (most among Big 12 Conference freshmen) and a fumble recovery. As a sophomore, he led the team with 5.5 sacks and nine tackles for loss and was named first-team All-Big 12 by the Associated Press and to the second-team by the league's coaches.

Lynch was named preseason first-team All-Big 12 and to the Chuck Bednarik Award watchlist entering his junior season. Lynch was named first-team All-Big 12, the Big 12 Defensive Lineman of the Year, the conference Defensive Player of the Year and was a unanimous All-America selection after finishing the regular season with 41 tackles, 19.5 tackles for loss and a conference-high 13.5 sacks along with three forced fumbles, two fumble recoveries, five passes defended and two blocked kicks. Lynch announced that he would forgo his senior season to enter the 2020 NFL draft.

== Professional career ==
Pre-draft measurables
| Height | Weight | Arm length | Hand span | Wingspan | 40-yard dash | 10-yard split | 20-yard split | 20-yard shuttle | Three-cone drill | Vertical jump | Broad jump | Bench press |
|---|---|---|---|---|---|---|---|---|---|---|---|---|
| 6 ft 3 5/8 in (1.92 m) | 289 lb (131 kg) | 31 7/8 in (0.81 m) | 9 7/8 in (0.25 m) | 6 ft 4 7/8 in (1.95 m) | 5.01 s | 1.73 s | 2.92 s | 4.39 s | 7.39 s | 29.0 in (0.74 m) | 9 ft 3 in (2.82 m) | 23 reps |
All values from NFL Combine

=== Minnesota Vikings ===
Lynch was selected by the Minnesota Vikings with the 130th overall pick in the fourth round of the 2020 NFL draft. He made his NFL debut on October 11, 2020, against the Seattle Seahawks on Sunday Night Football and recorded his first career sack on Russell Wilson during the 27–26 loss.

On August 4, 2023, it was announced that Lynch had suffered a torn ACL in practice and would miss the entirety of the 2023 season. He was placed on injured reserve two days later.

On May 14, 2024, Lynch re-signed with the Vikings. He was released on August 27.

=== Tennessee Titans ===
On August 29, 2024, Lynch was signed to the Tennessee Titans' practice squad. He was elevated to play during the Titans' season opener against the Chicago Bears. He was then promoted to the active roster on September 11. He appeared in all 17 games during the 2024 season as a rotational defensive lineman, making 20 tackles, two pass deflections, and a sack.

On May 7, 2025, Lynch re-signed with the Titans.

=== Chicago Bears ===
On March 18, 2026, Lynch signed with the Chicago Bears on a one-year contract. He was released by Chicago as a part of final roster cuts on August 30, and resigned to the practice squad.

In Week 8 against the Seattle Seahawks, Lynch caught his first career interception off a deflected Sam Darnold pass by Austin Booker in the fourth quarter, en route to a 34–17 win on Monday Night Football.

== Personal ==
Lynch's father, Tim, played linebacker for the University of Nebraska–Lincoln and gave him the middle name "Husker" after the school's mascot.
