= New Boston High School =

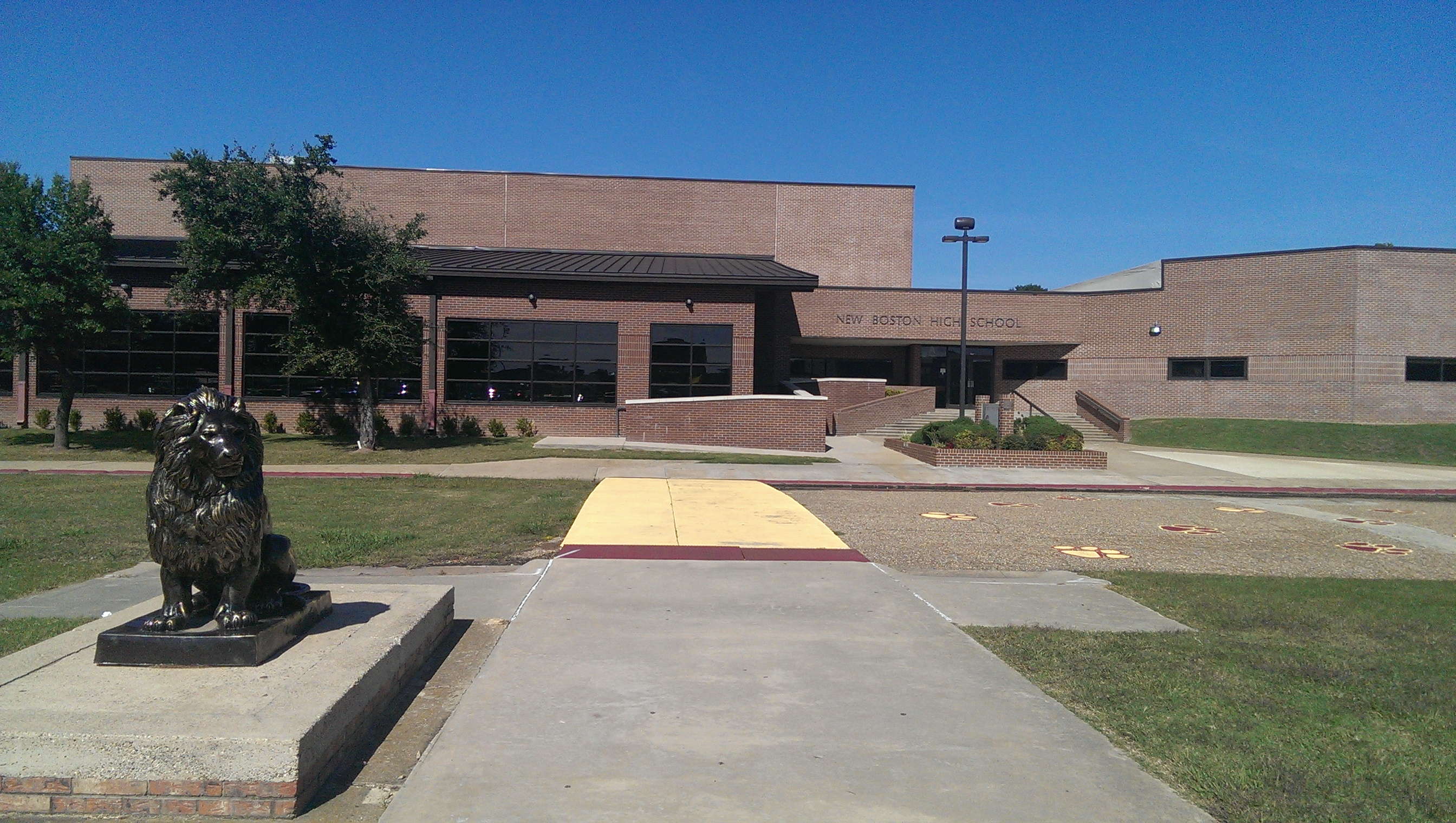

Location
- 1 Lion Drive; New Boston, Bowie County, Texas 75570-3199; United States; 33.456030°N 94.420412°W

Information
- School type: Public high school
- Locale: Town: Distant
- School district: New Boston ISD
- NCES School ID: 483234003586
- Principal: Neil Koenig
- Teaching staff: 36.86 (on an FTE basis)
- Grades: 9‍–‍12
- Enrollment: 343 (2023‍–‍2024)
- Student to teacher ratio: 9.31
- Colors: Maroon & Gold
- Athletics conference: UIL Class 3A
- Mascot: Lions/Lady Lions
- Website: New Boston High School

New Boston High School is a public high school located in New Boston, Texas and classified as a 3A school by the University Interscholastic League. It is part of the New Boston Independent School District located in central Bowie County. During 2022‍–‍2023, New Boston High School had an enrollment of 321 students and a student to teacher ratio of 8.74. The school received an overall rating of "A" from the Texas Education Agency for the 2024‍–‍2025 school year

== Academics ==
- UIL Journalism Champions -
  - 2008(2A), 2011(2A)

== Athletics ==
The New Boston Lions compete in these sports -

- Baseball
- Basketball
- Cross Country
- Football
- Golf
- Powerlifting
- Softball
- Tennis
- Track and Field
- Volleyball

=== State Titles ===
- Boys' Basketball -
  - 1984(3A)
- Boys' Track -
  - 1958(1A)

== Notable alumni ==
- Jeff Gladney, football player
- Devin the Dude, American rapper, 1988
