= Kenneth Murray (American football) =

American football player (born 1998)

- Murray in 2025

No. 50 – Houston Texans
- Position: Linebacker
- Roster status: Practice squad

Personal information
- Born: November 16, 1998 (age 27); Missouri City, Texas, U.S.
- Listed height: 6 ft 2 in (1.88 m)
- Listed weight: 241 lb (109 kg)

Career information
- High school: Elkins (Missouri City)
- College: Oklahoma (2017–2019)
- NFL draft: 2020: 1st round, 23rd overall pick

Career history
- Los Angeles Chargers (2020–2023); Tennessee Titans (2024); Dallas Cowboys (2025); Houston Texans (2026–present)

Awards and highlights
- PFWA All-Rookie Team (2020); First-team All-Big 12 (2019); Second-team All-Big 12 (2018); Big 12 Defensive Freshman of the Year (2017)

Career NFL statistics as of 2025
- Total tackles: 497
- Sacks: 9.5
- Forced fumbles: 2
- Fumble recoveries: 1
- Pass deflections: 14
- Interceptions: 3
- Stats at Pro Football Reference

Kenneth Rogers Murray Jr. (born November 16, 1998) is an American professional football linebacker for the Houston Texans of the National Football League (NFL). He played college football for the Oklahoma Sooners and was selected by the Los Angeles Chargers in the first round of the 2020 NFL draft. He signed with the Tennessee Titans in 2024 before being traded to the Cowboys in 2025.

== Early life ==
Murray attended Elkins High School in Missouri City, Texas. He committed to the University of Oklahoma to play college football.

== College career ==
As a freshman at Oklahoma in 2017, Murray started all 14 games, recording 78 tackles and one sack and was named the co-Big 12 Defensive Freshman of the Year. He again started all 14 games his sophomore year in 2018, recording 155 tackles and 4.5 sacks. Following a junior year where he was named to the First-team All-Big 12. Murray announced that he would forgo his senior season to declare for the 2020 NFL draft.

== Professional career ==
Pre-draft measurables
Height	Weight	Arm length	Hand span	Wingspan	40-yard dash	10-yard split	20-yard split	Vertical jump	Broad jump	Bench press
6 ft 2 1/2 in (1.89 m)	241 lb (109 kg)	32 3/4 in (0.83 m)	9 1/2 in (0.24 m)	6 ft 8 in (2.03 m)	4.52 s	1.54 s	2.66 s	38.0 in (0.97 m)	10 ft 9 in (3.28 m)	21 reps
All values from NFL Combine

=== Los Angeles Chargers ===
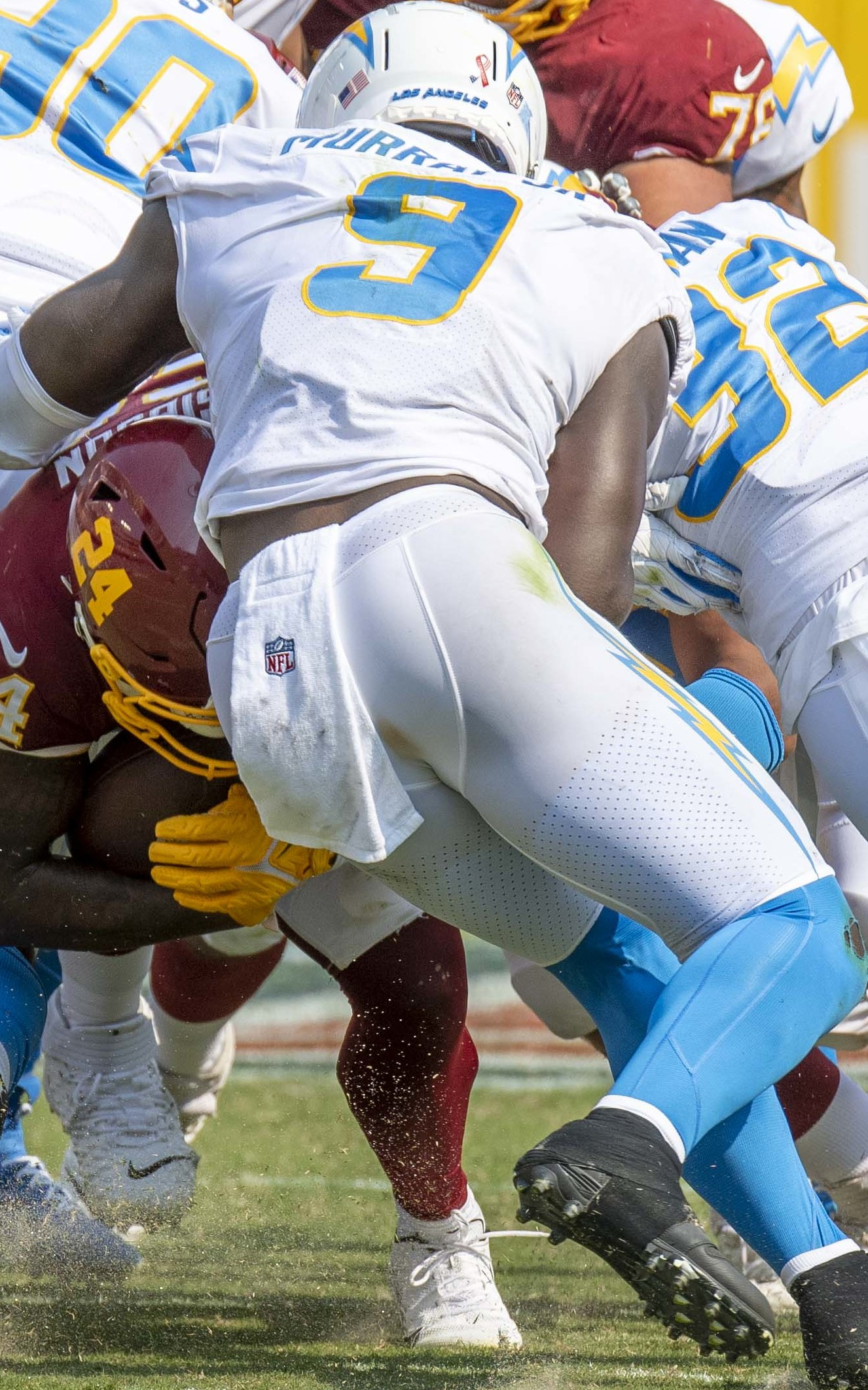
Murray playing for the Chargers in 2021.

Murray was selected by the Los Angeles Chargers in the first round with the 23rd pick in the 2020 NFL Draft. The Chargers moved up from their second and third round selections in a trade with the New England Patriots to acquire the pick used to select Murray.

In Week 13 against the Patriots, Murray led the team with 14 tackles (12 solo) and recorded his first career sack on Cam Newton during the 45–0 loss. He was named to the PFWA All-Rookie Team.

On October 4, 2021, Murray was placed on injured reserve after suffering an ankle injury in practice. He was activated on November 13.

On April 28, 2023, the Chargers opted to decline the fifth-year option of Murray's contract, making him a free agent in 2024.

=== Tennessee Titans ===
On March 14, 2024, Murray signed a two-year contract with the Tennessee Titans. Murray was named a team captain ahead of the 2024 season, and played 14 games as a starting inside linebacker before sustaining a wrist injury in a Week 16 game against the Indianapolis Colts. He was placed on injured reserve on December 25, ending his season. He finished the season with 95 total tackles, 3.5 sacks, and an interception.

=== Dallas Cowboys ===
On March 12, 2025, Murray and a seventh-round draft selection (#239-Phil Mafah) was traded to the Dallas Cowboys in exchange for a sixth-round draft selection (#188-Kalel Mullings). He was the primary starter at middle linebacker, but struggled significantly to adapt to the defensive scheme and failed to make much of an impact. His workload was reduced after Logan Wilson was acquired from the Cincinnati Bengals at the trade deadline. Murray registered 16 starts, 86 tackles (led the team), three tackles for loss, one sack, eight quarterback hurries, two passes defended, and one fumble recovery.

=== Houston Texans ===
On September 16, 2026, Murray was signed to the Houston Texans' practice squad. He was released on October 15, but re-signed a week later.

== NFL career statistics ==
Legend
**Bold**	Career high

=== Regular season ===
Year	Team	Games		Tackles						Interceptions						Fumbles	
Year	Team	GP	GS	Comb	Solo	Ast	Sck	TFL	Sfty	PD	Int	Yds	Avg	Lng	TD	FF	FR
2020	LAC	16	16	**107**	68	39	1.0	5	0	3	0	0	0.0	0	0	0	0
2021	LAC	11	6	31	17	14	0.0	2	0	0	0	0	0.0	0	0	0	0
2022	LAC	17	16	76	50	26	1.0	7	0	3	**1**	**16**	**16.0**	**16**	0	**1**	0
2023	LAC	15	15	**107**	**79**	28	3.0	7	0	**4**	**1**	0	0.0	0	0	0	0
2024	TEN	14	14	95	57	38	**3.5**	**8**	0	2	**1**	6	6.0	6	0	**1**	0
2025	DAL	17	16	81	38	**43**	1.0	4	0	2	0	0	0.0	0	0	0	**1**
Career		90	83	497	309	188	9.5	33	0	14	3	22	7.3	16	0	2	1

=== Postseason ===
Year	Team	Games		Tackles						Interceptions						Fumbles	
Year	Team	GP	GS	Comb	Solo	Ast	Sck	TFL	Sfty	PD	Int	Yds	Avg	Lng	TD	FF	FR
2022	LAC	1	1	8	2	6	0.5	0	0	0	0	0	0.0	0	0	0	0
Career		1	1	8	2	6	0.5	0	0	0	0	0	0.0	0	0	0	0
