= Devin Duvernay =

American football player (born 1997)

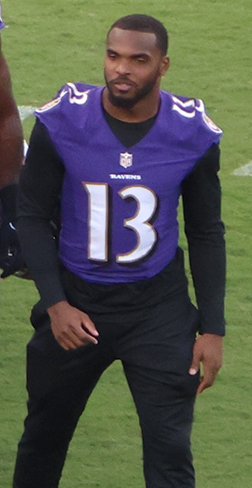
- Duvernay with the Baltimore Ravens in 2022

No. 81 – Arizona Cardinals
- Position: Wide receiver / Return specialist
- Roster status: Active

Personal information
- Born: September 12, 1997 (age 29); Sachse, Texas, U.S.
- Listed height: 5 ft 11 in (1.80 m)
- Listed weight: 202 lb (92 kg)

Career information
- High school: Sachse
- College: Texas (2016–2019)
- NFL draft: 2020: 3rd round, 92nd overall pick

Career history
- Baltimore Ravens (2020–2023); Jacksonville Jaguars (2024); Chicago Bears (2025); Arizona Cardinals (2026–present)

Awards and highlights
- First-team All-Pro (2021) (Note: Selected as a punt returner); 2× Pro Bowl (2021, 2022); First-team All-Big 12 (2019)

Career NFL statistics as of Week 5, 2026
- Receptions: 107
- Receiving yards: 1,003
- Return yards: 4,881
- Rushing yards: 222
- Total touchdowns: 9
- Stats at Pro Football Reference

Devin Duvernay (born September 12, 1997) is an American professional football wide receiver and return specialist for the Arizona Cardinals of the National Football League (NFL). He played college football for the Texas Longhorns and was selected by the Baltimore Ravens in the third round of the 2020 NFL draft. Duvernay has earned Pro Bowl honors twice and was a first-team All-Pro in 2021 for his play as a return specialist. Duvernay has also played for the Jacksonville Jaguars and Chicago Bears.

== Early life ==
Duvernay attended Sachse High School in Sachse, Texas. During his high school football career, he had 170 receptions for 2,906 yards and 36 touchdowns. He also holds the school record for longest kickoff return touchdown with 109 yards, a feat he accomplished as a sophomore. He played in the 2016 Under Armour All-America Game. Duvernay originally committed to Baylor University to play college football but switched to the University of Texas at Austin.

== College career ==
As a true freshman at Texas in 2016, Duvernay played in all 12 games with two starts. He had 20 receptions for 412 yards and three touchdowns. As a sophomore in 2017, he played in all 13 games recording nine receptions for 124 yards. As a junior in 2018, he started all 14 games. For the season, he had 41 receptions for 546 yards and four touchdowns. Duvernay returned to Texas his senior year in 2019 as the number one receiver compiling 1,386 yards receiving as well as nine touchdowns on 106 receptions.

=== Statistics ===
Year	Team	Games		Receiving				Rushing			
Year	Team	GP	GS	Rec	Yds	Avg	TD	Att	Yds	Avg	TD
2016	Texas	12	2	20	412	20.6	3	0	0	0.0	0
2017	Texas	13	1	9	124	13.8	0	0	0	0.0	0
2018	Texas	14	14	41	546	13.3	4	1	10	10.0	0
2019	Texas	13	13	106	1,386	13.1	9	10	24	2.4	1
Career		52	30	176	2,468	14.0	16	11	34	3.1	1

== Professional career ==
Pre-draft measurables
Height	Weight	Arm length	Hand span	Wingspan	40-yard dash	10-yard split	20-yard split	20-yard shuttle	Three-cone drill	Vertical jump	Broad jump
5 ft 10 1/2 in (1.79 m)	200 lb (91 kg)	30 5/8 in (0.78 m)	9 1/2 in (0.24 m)	6 ft 3 1/4 in (1.91 m)	4.39 s	1.56 s	2.58 s	4.20 s	7.13 s	35.5 in (0.90 m)	10 ft 3 in (3.12 m)
All values from NFL Combine

=== Baltimore Ravens ===
==== 2020 season ====
Duvernay was selected by the Baltimore Ravens in the third round with the 92nd overall pick in the 2020 NFL draft.

Duvernay made his NFL debut in Week 1 against the Cleveland Browns and recorded a 12-yard reception in the 38–6 victory. In Week 3 against the Kansas City Chiefs, he recorded a 93-yard kickoff return for his first career touchdown in the 20–34 loss. In Week 5 against the Cincinnati Bengals, he had a 42-yard rush on a jet sweep to go along with two catches for 17 yards as the Ravens won 27–3. He had three catches for a season-high 45 yards in a 17–23 Week 10 loss to the New England Patriots.

==== 2021 season ====
Duvernay had a slightly more active role at the beginning of the 2021 season due to injuries to Miles Boykin and Rashod Bateman. In Week 2 against the Chiefs, Duvernay recovered a fumble by teammate Ty'Son Williams at the Kansas City two yard line and scored a touchdown. The Ravens would win 36–35. The next week against the Detroit Lions, he had first career receiving touchdown on a 19-yard reception in a 19–17 win. In Week 9 against the Minnesota Vikings, Duvernay recorded his second receiving touchdown on a five-yard reception that he caught one-handed. The Ravens would win 34–31 in overtime. Duvernay was selected to his first pro bowl as a return specialist at the end of the season.

==== 2022 season ====
The trade of Marquise Brown during the offseason setup Duvernay to be a full-time starter at wide receiver along with Rashod Bateman. He recorded his first multi-touchdown game of his career in 24–9 win Week 1 over the New York Jets, finishing the game with four receptions for 54 yards and two touchdowns. The next week against the Miami Dolphins, he returned the opening kickoff 103 yards for a touchdown. He also had two receptions for 42 yards, but the Ravens would lose, 38–42. He was placed on injured reserve on December 20, 2022, after suffering a severe foot injury during a practice session. Duvernay finished the season with a career-high 49 catches for 407 yards and three touchdowns and was selected to his second pro bowl as a return specialist at the end of the season.

==== 2023 season ====
The signings of Odell Beckham Jr. and Nelson Agholor, the drafting of Zay Flowers, and the return of Rashod Bateman relegated Duvernay back to being a return specialist. He suffered a back injury in Week 14 and was placed on IR shortly thereafter. He was activated off IR on January 10, 2024.

=== Jacksonville Jaguars ===
On March 13, 2024, Duvernay signed a two-year contract with the Jacksonville Jaguars. On March 12, 2025, Duvernay was released by Jacksonville.

=== Chicago Bears ===
On March 19, 2025, Duvernay signed a one-year contract with the Chicago Bears. On August 27, Duvernay was released by Chicago as part of final roster cuts; he was re-signed to the team's active roster the following day.

Duvernay served as the Bears' primary kick returner during the 2025 season. In Week 11 against the Vikings, after Minnesota had scored the go-ahead touchdown with 50 seconds remaining, he returned the ensuing kickoff 56 yards to the opposing 40-yard line. The return set up the Bears to eventually kick the game-winning field goal.

=== Arizona Cardinals ===
On March 15, 2026, Duvernay signed a one-year, $2.5 million contract with the Arizona Cardinals.

== NFL career statistics ==
Legend
**Bold**	Career high

=== Regular season ===
Regular season statistics
Year	Team	Games		Receiving					Rushing					Kick returns					Punt returns					Fumbles	
Year	Team	GP	GS	Rec	Yds	Avg	Lng	TD	Att	Yds	Avg	Lng	TD	Ret	Yds	Avg	Lng	TD	Ret	Yds	Avg	Lng	TD	Fum	Lost
2020	BAL	16	3	20	201	10.1	**39**	0	4	70	**17.5**	**42**	0	21	578	**27.5**	93	**1**	4	46	11.5	19	0	0	0
2021	BAL	16	7	33	272	8.2	21	2	7	50	7.1	19	0	28	676	24.1	47	0	**26**	**360**	**13.8**	42	0	**1**	0
2022	BAL	14	**13**	**37**	**407**	11.0	31	**3**	**12**	**84**	7.0	18	**1**	15	383	25.5	**103**	**1**	16	190	11.9	46	0	**1**	0
2023	BAL	13	1	4	18	4.5	10	0	4	15	3.8	8	0	9	174	19.3	28	0	23	290	12.6	**70**	0	0	0
2024	JAX	13	1	11	79	7.2	28	0	4	3	0.8	4	0	14	351	25.1	34	0	19	167	8.8	53	0	**1**	0
2025	CHI	**17**	0	2	26	**13.0**	24	0	0	0	0.0	0	0	**40**	**1,069**	26.7	56	0	21	231	11.0	56	0	**1**	0
2026	ARI	5	0	0	0	0.0	0	0	0	0	0.0	0	0	12	326	27.2	40	0	4	40	10.0	12	0	0	0
Career		94	25	107	1,003	9.4	39	5	31	222	7.2	42	1	139	3,557	25.6	103	2	113	1,324	11.7	70	0	4	0

=== Postseason ===
Postseason statistics
Year	Team	Games		Receiving					Rushing					Kick returns					Punt returns					Fumbles	
Year	Team	GP	GS	Rec	Yds	Avg	Lng	TD	Att	Yds	Avg	Lng	TD	Ret	Yds	Avg	Lng	TD	Ret	Yds	Avg	Lng	TD	Fum	Lost
2020	BAL	2	0	0	0	0.0	0	0	0	0	0.0	0	0	1	20	20.0	20	0	0	0	0.0	0	0	0	0
2022	BAL	0	0	Did not play due to injury																					
2023	BAL	2	0	0	0	0.0	0	0	0	0	0.0	0	0	2	53	26.5	**37**	0	3	32	10.7	21	0	0	0
2025	CHI	2	0	0	0	0.0	0	0	0	0	0.0	0	0	**5**	**138**	**27.6**	31	0	**6**	**97**	**16.2**	**37**	0	0	0
Career		6	0	0	0	0.0	0	0	0	0	0.0	0	0	8	211	26.4	37	0	9	129	14.3	37	0	0	0

== Personal life ==
Duvernay is the cousin of Minnesota Vikings quarterback Kyler Murray as well as having a twin brother named Donovan who also played college football for the Texas Longhorns as a defensive back. Donovan transferred to Northwestern State University for his senior season.
