= A. J. Green (defensive back) =

American football player (born 1998)

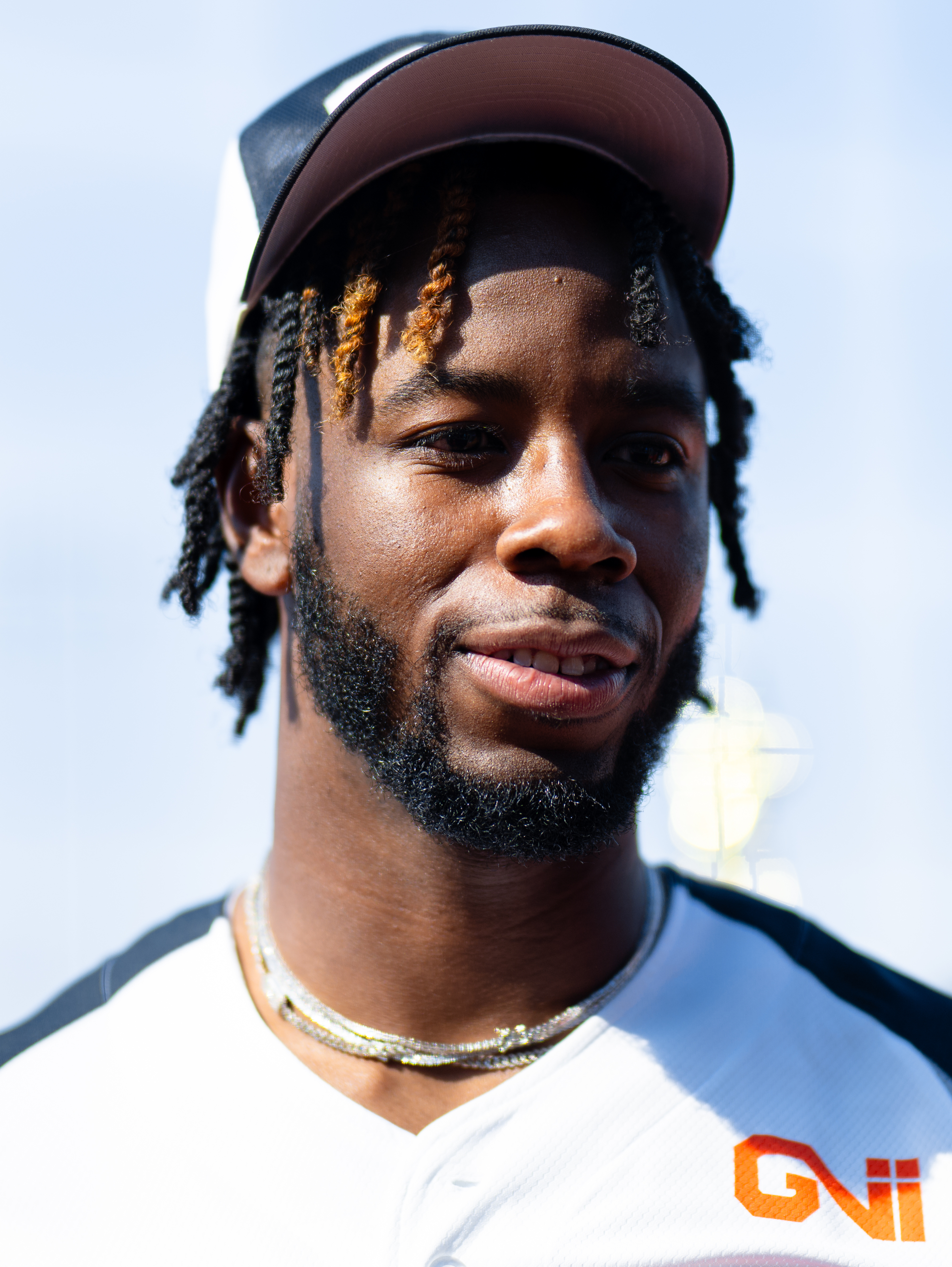
- Green in 2023

Profile
- Position: Cornerback

Personal information
- Born: June 9, 1998 (age 28); Dallas, Texas, U.S.
- Listed height: 6 ft 2 in (1.88 m)
- Listed weight: 193 lb (88 kg)

Career information
- High school: DeSoto (DeSoto, Texas)
- College: Oklahoma State (2016–2019)
- NFL draft: 2020: undrafted

Career history
- Cleveland Browns (2020–2023); Minnesota Vikings (2024)*; Los Angeles Rams (2024–2025); Miami Dolphins (2025)
- * Offseason or practice squad member only

Awards and highlights
- 2× Second-team All-Big 12 (2018–2019)

Career NFL statistics as of 2025
- Total tackles: 41
- Fumble recoveries: 2
- Pass deflections: 7
- Interceptions: 2
- Stats at Pro Football Reference

Alvin J. Green III (born June 9, 1998) is an American professional football cornerback. He played college football for the Oklahoma State Cowboys, and signed with the Cleveland Browns as an undrafted free agent in 2020.

== Early life ==
Green played cornerback at DeSoto High School. He was a three-star cornerback coming out of high school, receiving offers from several Division I schools, such as Missouri, Colorado, and Oklahoma. Green ultimately committed to Oklahoma State on August 25, 2015.

== College career ==
Green was named a Jim Thorpe award semifinalist after his senior season. Green participated in the 2020 Senior Bowl on January 25, 2020.

== Professional career ==
Pre-draft measurables
Height	Weight	Arm length	Hand span	Wingspan	40-yard dash	10-yard split	20-yard split	20-yard shuttle	Three-cone drill	Vertical jump	Broad jump	Bench press
6 ft 1 1/2 in (1.87 m)	202 lb (92 kg)	30 7/8 in (0.78 m)	9 in (0.23 m)	6 ft 2 7/8 in (1.90 m)	4.62 s	1.55 s	2.69 s	4.28 s	7.20 s	34.0 in (0.86 m)	9 ft 6 in (2.90 m)	13 reps
All values from NFL Combine/Pro Day

=== Cleveland Browns ===
After going undrafted in the 2020 NFL draft, Green signed with the Cleveland Browns as an undrafted free agent on May 5, 2020. He was waived during final roster cuts on September 5, 2020, and signed to the practice squad the next day. He was elevated to the active roster on September 26 and January 2, 2021, for the team's weeks 3 and 17 games against the Washington Football Team and Pittsburgh Steelers, and reverted to the practice squad after each game. Green was elevated to the active roster yet again on January 9, 2021, for the team's wild card playoff game against the Steelers, and reverted to the practice squad again following the game. He was placed on the practice squad/injured list on January 12.

Green signed a reserve/futures contract by the Browns on January 18, 2021. In Week 17 of the 2021 season, he recorded his first professional interception against the Steelers.

After making the initial 53-man roster before the start the 2023 season, Green was waived by the Browns on August 30, 2023. Two days later, Green signed with Browns' practice squad. He was not signed to a reserve/future contract by the team after the season and thus became a free agent upon the expiration of his practice squad contract.

=== Minnesota Vikings ===
On January 23, 2024, Green signed a reserve/future contract with the Minnesota Vikings. He was released on August 26.

=== Los Angeles Rams ===
On November 18, 2024, Green signed with the Los Angeles Rams practice squad, but did not see action during the remainder of the season. He signed a reserve/future contract on January 20, 2025.

On August 26, 2025, Green was released by the Rams as part of final roster cuts and re-signed to the practice squad the next day. Prior to the Rams' Week 6 game at the Baltimore Ravens, Green was elevated to the team's active roster.

=== Miami Dolphins ===
On November 19, 2025, Green was signed by the Miami Dolphins off of the Rams' practice squad.

On March 11, 2026, Green re-signed with the Dolphins. He was released by the Dolphins on August 31.

== Personal life ==
Alvin Green III (AJ) is the eldest and only son of Nissaa Muhammad and Alvin Green II. He has two sisters Nila Green and Nadiya Green.
