= Adrian Ealy =

American football player (born 1999)

Profile
- Position: Offensive tackle

Personal information
- Born: August 7, 1999 (age 27); Gonzales, Louisiana, U.S.
- Listed height: 6 ft 6 in (1.98 m)
- Listed weight: 338 lb (153 kg)

Career information
- High school: East Ascension
- College: Oklahoma
- NFL draft: 2021: undrafted

Career history
- Baltimore Ravens (2021)*; Denver Broncos (2021)*; Los Angeles Rams (2021)*; Baltimore Ravens (2021)*; Green Bay Packers (2021)*; Los Angeles Rams (2022)*; Pittsburgh Steelers (2022)*; Seattle Sea Dragons (2024)*; Arlington Renegades (2024–2025); DC Defenders (2026); Birmingham Stallions (2026)
- * Offseason or practice squad member only

Awards and highlights
- 2× Second-team All-Big 12 (2019, 2020)

Adrian Ealy (born August 7, 1999) is an American football offensive tackle. He played college football at Oklahoma. He signed with the Baltimore Ravens after going undrafted in the 2021 NFL draft.

== College career ==
Ealy did not play during 2017 as he was redshirted and played only five games in 2018 in a backup role. He was named the starter in 2019 and in 2020 playing and starting in all games. He was selected to the Second-team All-Big 12 team for those seasons.

== Professional career ==
Pre-draft measurables
Height	Weight	Arm length	Hand span	Wingspan	40-yard dash	10-yard split	20-yard split	20-yard shuttle	Three-cone drill	Vertical jump	Broad jump	Bench press
6 ft 6 1/4 in (1.99 m)	321 lb (146 kg)	33 in (0.84 m)	9 7/8 in (0.25 m)	6 ft 8 7/8 in (2.05 m)	5.42 s	1.84 s	3.10 s	4.87 s	8.82 s	24.5 in (0.62 m)	8 ft 8 in (2.64 m)	18 reps
All values from Pro Day

=== Baltimore Ravens ===
Ealy went undrafted in the 2021 NFL draft; however, he shortly signed with the Baltimore Ravens as an undrafted free agent. He was waived by the Ravens in the final round of preseason roster cuts on August 31, and re-signed to their practice squad the next day. On October 11, Ealy was suspended without pay for six weeks after he violated the NFL policy on performance-enhancing substances. He was released by Baltimore on November 23.

=== Denver Broncos ===
On November 30, 2021, Ealy was signed to the Denver Broncos' practice squad. He was released by the Broncos on December 14.

=== Los Angeles Rams ===
On December 18, 2021, Ealy was signed to the Los Angeles Rams' practice squad, but was released three days later.

=== Baltimore Ravens (second stint) ===
On December 23, 2021, Ealy was signed to the Baltimore Ravens' practice squad, but was released four days later.

=== Green Bay Packers ===
On December 29, 2021, Ealy was signed to the Green Bay Packers practice squad. He was released on January 11, 2022.

=== Los Angeles Rams (second stint) ===
On February 11, 2022, Ealy signed a reserve/future contract with the Los Angeles Rams. On August 16, Ealy was released by the Rams.

=== Pittsburgh Steelers ===
On August 22, 2022, Ealy signed with the Pittsburgh Steelers. He was released on August 30.

=== Seattle Sea Dragons ===
On October 23, 2023, Ealy signed with the Seattle Sea Dragons of the XFL. The Sea Dragons folded when the XFL and United States Football League (USFL) merged to create the United Football League (UFL).

=== Arlington Renegades ===
On January 5, 2024, Ealy was drafted by the Arlington Renegades during the 2024 UFL dispersal draft. He re-signed with the team on September 27.

=== DC Defenders ===
On January 13, 2026, Ealy was selected by the DC Defenders in the 2026 UFL Draft. He was released on April 2.

=== Birmingham Stallions ===
On May 5, 2026, Ealy signed with the Birmingham Stallions of the United Football League (UFL).
