= Colton McKivitz =

American football player (born 1996)

No. 68 – San Francisco 49ers
- Position: Offensive tackle
- Roster status: Active

Personal information
- Born: August 9, 1996 (age 30); Jacobsburg, Ohio, U.S.
- Listed height: 6 ft 6 in (1.98 m)
- Listed weight: 301 lb (137 kg)

Career information
- High school: Union Local (Belmont, Ohio)
- College: West Virginia (2015–2019)
- NFL draft: 2020: 5th round, 153rd overall pick

Career history
- San Francisco 49ers (2020–present)

Awards and highlights
- Second-team All-American (2019); Big 12 co-Offensive Lineman of the Year (2019); First-team All-Big 12 (2019)

Career NFL statistics as of Week 1, 2026
- Games played: 80
- Games started: 57
- Stats at Pro Football Reference

Colton McKivitz (born August 9, 1996) is an American professional football offensive tackle for the San Francisco 49ers of the National Football League (NFL). He played college football for the West Virginia Mountaineers.

== Early life ==
McKivitz grew up in Belmont, Ohio and attended East Richland Christian High School before transferring to Union Local High School shortly before his sophomore year. As a senior, McKivitz was named first-team All-Ohio. Union Local retired McKivitz's jersey number in 2019. A 3-star recruit, McKivitz initially committed to play college football at Miami of Ohio but later switched his commitment to West Virginia over offers from Akron, Bowling Green, Kent State, Marshall, and Toledo.

== College career ==
McKivitz redshirted his true freshman season. He became the Mountaineers' starting left tackle four games into his redshirt freshman season after starter Yodny Cajuste tore his ACL and McKivitz started the final ten games of the season. As a redshirt sophomore, he moved to right tackle, starting all 13 games and earning honorable mention All-Big 12 Conference honors. McKivitz started all 12 of the Mountaineers, games as a redshirt junior. He moved back to left tackle going into his redshirt senior season and was named first-team All-Big 12, the Big 12 co-Offensive Lineman of the Year and a second-team All-American by Walter Camp and the Associated Press's third-team.

== Professional career ==
Pre-draft measurables
| Height | Weight | Arm length | Hand span | Wingspan | 40-yard dash | 10-yard split | 20-yard split | 20-yard shuttle | Three-cone drill | Vertical jump | Broad jump | Bench press |
|---|---|---|---|---|---|---|---|---|---|---|---|---|
| 6 ft 6 1/8 in (1.98 m) | 306 lb (139 kg) | 33 3/4 in (0.86 m) | 10 in (0.25 m) | 6 ft 9 5/8 in (2.07 m) | 5.35 s | 1.80 s | 3.06 s | 5.00 s | 7.87 s | 26.0 in (0.66 m) | 8 ft 10 in (2.69 m) | 20 reps |
All values from NFL Combine

McKivitz was selected in the fifth round of the 2020 NFL draft with the 153rd pick by the San Francisco 49ers. The 49ers previously acquired the selection from the Miami Dolphins by trading Matt Breida to Miami. He made his NFL debut in Week 2 against the New York Jets, playing eight snaps on offense and five snaps on special teams. McKivitz made his first career start on November 29, 2020, lining up at right guard and playing all 72 of the 49ers offensive snaps in a 23–20 win over the Los Angeles Rams. He was placed on the reserve/COVID-19 list by the team on December 16, 2020, and activated on December 25.

On August 31, 2021, McKivitz was waived by the 49ers and re-signed to the practice squad the next day. He was promoted to the active roster on November 10, 2021.

On March 10, 2022, McKivitz re-signed with the 49ers. McKivitz suffered a high ankle sprain in Week 4 and was placed on injured reserve on October 8, 2022. He was activated on November 12.

On March 9, 2023, McKivitz signed a two-year contract extension with the 49ers. McKivitz replaced Mike McGlinchey as starter after McGlinchey departed in Free Agency for this Denver Broncos that summer. During the 2023 season McKivitz started all 17 games and was a starter in Super Bowl LVIII. The 49ers lost to the Chiefs 25–22 in overtime.

On March 13, 2024, McKivitz signed a one-year, $7 million contract extension with the 49ers through the 2025 season.

On September 8, 2025, McKivitz signed a three-year, $45 million contract extension with the 49ers that runs through the 2028 season.

== NFL career statistics ==
Legend
| **Bold** | Career high |

=== Regular season ===
| Year | Team | Games | | Tackles | | | | | Interceptions | | | | | | Fumbles | | | | |
| Year | Team | GP | GS | Cmb | Solo | Ast | Sck | TFL | Int | Yds | Avg | Lng | TD | PD | FF | Fum | FR | Yds | TD |
|---|---|---|---|---|---|---|---|---|---|---|---|---|---|---|---|---|---|---|---|
| 2020 | SF | 14 | 3 | 0 | 0 | 0 | 0.0 | 0 | — | — | — | — | — | — | 0 | 0 | 0 | 0 | 0 |
| 2021 | SF | 1 | 1 | 0 | 0 | 0 | 0.0 | 0 | — | — | — | — | — | — | 0 | 0 | 0 | 0 | 0 |
| 2022 | SF | 13 | 1 | 0 | 0 | 0 | 0.0 | 0 | — | — | — | — | — | — | 0 | 0 | 0 | 0 | 0 |
| 2023 | SF | 17 | 17 | 0 | 0 | 0 | 0.0 | 0 | — | — | — | — | — | — | 0 | 0 | 0 | 0 | 0 |
| 2024 | SF | 17 | 17 | 0 | 0 | 0 | 0.0 | 0 | — | — | — | — | — | — | 0 | 0 | 0 | 0 | 0 |
| 2025 | SF | 17 | 17 | **1** | **1** | 0 | 0.0 | 0 | — | — | — | — | — | — | 0 | 0 | **1** | 0 | 0 |
| 2026 | SF | 1 | 1 | 0 | 0 | 0 | 0.0 | 0 | — | — | — | — | — | — | 0 | 0 | 0 | 0 | 0 |
| Career | | 80 | 57 | 1 | 1 | 0 | 0.0 | 0 | — | — | — | — | — | — | 0 | 0 | 1 | 0 | 0 |

=== Postseason ===
| Year | Team | Games | | Tackles | | | | | Interceptions | | | | | | Fumbles | | | | |
| Year | Team | GP | GS | Cmb | Solo | Ast | Sck | TFL | Int | Yds | Avg | Lng | TD | PD | FF | Fum | FR | Yds | TD |
|---|---|---|---|---|---|---|---|---|---|---|---|---|---|---|---|---|---|---|---|
| 2021 | SF | 2 | 0 | — | — | — | — | — | — | — | — | — | — | — | 0 | 0 | 0 | 0 | 0 |
| 2022 | SF | 3 | 0 | — | — | — | — | — | — | — | — | — | — | — | 0 | 0 | 0 | 0 | 0 |
| 2023 | SF | 3 | 3 | — | — | — | — | — | — | — | — | — | — | — | 0 | 0 | 0 | 0 | 0 |
| 2025 | SF | 2 | 2 | — | — | — | — | — | — | — | — | — | — | — | 0 | 0 | 0 | 0 | 0 |
| Career | | 10 | 5 | — | — | — | — | — | — | — | — | — | — | — | 0 | 0 | 0 | 0 | 0 |
