= Jeff Gladney =

American football player (1996–2022)

No. 20
- Position: Cornerback

Personal information
- Born: December 12, 1996; New Boston, Texas, U.S.
- Died: May 30, 2022 (aged 25); Dallas, Texas, U.S.
- Listed height: 5 ft 10 in (1.78 m)
- Listed weight: 199 lb (90 kg)

Career information
- High school: New Boston
- College: TCU (2015–2019)
- NFL draft: 2020: 1st round, 31st overall pick

Career history
- Minnesota Vikings (2020); Arizona Cardinals (2022)*
- * Offseason or practice squad member only

Awards and highlights
- First-team All-Big 12 (2019); Second-team All-Big 12 (2018)

Career NFL statistics
- Total tackles: 81
- Forced fumbles: 1
- Pass deflections: 3
- Stats at Pro Football Reference

Jeff Gladney (December 12, 1996 – May 30, 2022) was an American professional football player who was a cornerback for one season in the National Football League (NFL). He played college football for the TCU Horned Frogs and was a two-time all-conference selection in the Big 12.

Gladney was selected by the Minnesota Vikings in the first round of the 2020 NFL draft. He was released in August 2021 after an indictment for domestic violence. After he was found not guilty, he signed with the Arizona Cardinals in March 2022, but was killed in a car crash two months later.

== Early life ==
Playing at New Boston High School in New Boston, Texas, Gladney was a three-star recruit and signed with Texas Christian University (TCU) to play college football for the TCU Horned Frogs on February 5, 2015, after originally committing to the program on June 6, 2014. Gladney chose TCU over offers from North Texas, Northern Illinois, Rice, Texas State, Tulsa, and UTSA.

== College career ==
Gladney redshirted his freshman year due to a torn anterior cruciate ligament sustained during his senior year in high school, but then was a four-year starter at Texas Christian University. During his junior season, Gladney made waves as a cover corner, earning first-team all-Big 12 Conference by Pro Football Focus and second-team all-Big 12 by the coaches. He injured a meniscus before his senior season but played the whole year, waiting for surgery until after the conclusion of the season. Over his TCU career, he recorded five interceptions and was named to the 2020 Senior Bowl roster after his senior season as well as garnering first-team all-Big 12 honors by the Associated Press.

NFL draft evaluators praised Gladney for his physical style of play.

== Professional career ==
Pre-draft measurables
Height	Weight	Arm length	Hand span	Wingspan	40-yard dash	10-yard split	20-yard split	Three-cone drill	Vertical jump	Broad jump	Bench press
5 ft 10 1/4 in (1.78 m)	191 lb (87 kg)	31 7/8 in (0.81 m)	9 in (0.23 m)	6 ft 3 1/4 in (1.91 m)	4.48 s	1.53 s	2.64 s	7.26 s	37.5 in (0.95 m)	10 ft 4 in (3.15 m)	17 reps
All values from NFL Combine

=== Minnesota Vikings ===
Gladney was selected by the Minnesota Vikings in the first round with the 31st overall pick in the 2020 NFL draft.

Heading into his first training camp, Gladney competed for a starting job against Mike Hughes, Holton Hill, and fellow rookie Cameron Dantzler, and ended up starting every game of the 2020 season as cornerback from Week 2 onwards. In Week 6 against the Atlanta Falcons, Gladney recorded his first forced fumble on running back Brian Hill which was recovered by the Vikings during the 40–23 loss. Overall, Gladney finished the 2020 season with 81 total tackles, three passes defensed, and one forced fumble.

Gladney was released on August 3, 2021, after his indictment for domestic violence. In March 2022, he was found not guilty of the charges.

=== Arizona Cardinals ===
On March 16, 2022, Gladney signed with the Arizona Cardinals.

== Personal life and death ==
Jeff Gee Gladney was born on December 12, 1996. He was raised in the New Boston Independent School District from kindergarten through 12th grade. Gladney, a 3-sport varsity athlete, won an accolade of awards during his time at New Boston High School. He was voted “Most Athletic” his senior year.

Gladney earned his way on to Texas Christian University football team and was redshirted as a freshman in the fall of 2015. Gladney graduated from TCU with his bachelors in May 2019.

Gladney had one son, born in 2021. Gladney was close friends with TCU teammate and fellow 2020 first round draft pick, wide receiver Jalen Reagor.

On May 30, 2022, Gladney and his girlfriend, Mercedes Palacios, were killed in a car crash in Dallas, Texas, at 2:30 am. Police reports indicated that Gladney's Mercedes SUV clipped a car while traveling at an excessive speed; his vehicle then spun off the road, crashed into a brick wall, and ignited into flames. Gladney was 25 years old; Palacios was 26.

== See also ==
- List of gridiron football players who died during their careers
