= Joshua Youngblood =

American football player (born 2001)

No. 5 – Delaware Fightin' Blue Hens
- Position: Wide receiver
- Class: Graduate

Personal information
- Born: January 26, 2001 (age 25); Tampa, Florida, U.S.
- Listed height: 5 ft 10 in (1.78 m)
- Listed weight: 185 lb (84 kg)

Career information
- High school: Berkeley Preparatory (Tampa, Florida)
- College: Kansas State (2019–2020); Rutgers (2021–2022); Delaware (2023–present)

Awards and highlights
- First team All-Big 12 (2019); Big 12 Special Teams Player of the Year (2019)
- Stats at ESPN

Joshua Leo Youngblood (born January 26, 2001) is a professional American football wide receiver and kick returner for the Saarland Hurricanes of the German Football League. He previously played for the Helsinki Wolverines in Finland. He previously played at Delaware Fightin' Blue Hens, Kansas State and at Rutgers.

== Early life ==
Youngblood grew up in Tampa, Florida and attended Berkeley Preparatory School, where he played wide receiver until moving to quarterback before his junior year. He passed for 672 yards and eight touchdowns while rushing for 855 yards and 11 touchdowns. As a senior, Youngblood rushed 1,326 yards and 15 touchdowns on 206 carries while throwing for 384 yards and five touchdowns and catching one pass for a 73-yard touchdown. Youngblood initially committed to play college football at Temple, but later changed his commitment to Kansas State over offers from Boston College, Air Force and Navy, who recruited him to play quarterback.

== College career ==
=== Kansas State ===
As a true freshman, Youngblood served as the Wildcats' primary kick returner and returned 13 kickoffs for 495 yards and three touchdowns and was named first team All-Big 12 Conference and the conference Special Teams Player of the Year. He also caught nine passes for 73 yards and rushed 11 times for 55 yards and a touchdown on offense. Youngblood was named a preseason All-American by Phil Steele, ESPN and CBS Sports entering his sophomore season. After appearing in only two of Kansas State's first four games and recording no receptions, Youngblood entered the transfer portal.

=== Rutgers ===
Youngblood announced that he would be transferring to Rutgers in November, 2020. In his first season with the team he played in nine games and had six catches for 52 yards and one touchdown and returned seven kicks for 156 yards. As a senior, Youngblood caught six passes for 74 yards and returned six kickoffs for 129 yards. After the season, he decided to utilize the extra year of eligibility granted to college athletes who played in the 2020 season due to the coronavirus pandemic and entered the NCAA transfer portal for a second time.

=== Delaware ===
Youngblood join the Delaware Fightin' Blue Hens as a graduate transfer.

== Professional career ==
Pre-draft measurables
Height	Weight	Arm length	Hand span	40-yard dash	10-yard split	20-yard split	Bench press
5 ft 9 3/8 in (1.76 m)	185 lb (84 kg)	30 3/4 in (0.78 m)	9 1/2 in (0.24 m)	4.54 s	1.66 s	2.66 s	20 reps
All values from Pro Day

He played for the Helsinki Wolverines in the top league in Finland, earning league All Star honors. In 2026, Youngblood played for the Saarland Hurricanes in the German Football League. He was honored as the league MVP for the season with his all purpose production.
