= Clay Johnston (American football) =

American football player (born 1996)

Profile
- Position: Linebacker

Personal information
- Born: August 8, 1996 (age 30); Green Bay, Wisconsin, U.S.
- Listed height: 6 ft 1 in (1.85 m)
- Listed weight: 232 lb (105 kg)

Career information
- High school: Wylie (Abilene, Texas)
- College: Baylor (2015–2019)
- NFL draft: 2020: 7th round, 234th overall pick

Career history
- Los Angeles Rams (2020)*; Carolina Panthers (2020–2021); Cincinnati Bengals (2021–2023)
- * Offseason or practice squad member only

Awards and highlights
- 2× Second-team All-Big 12 (2018, 2019)

Career NFL statistics
- Total tackles: 36
- Forced fumbles: 1
- Stats at Pro Football Reference

Clay Johnston (born August 8, 1996) is an American professional football linebacker. He played college football for the Baylor Bears.

== College career ==
Johnston missed several games in 2017. He was a second-team all-Big 12 Conference selection in 2018 after recording a team-high 99 tackles. As a senior, he made 58 tackles, eight for loss, 2.5 sacks, one interception, and five pass breakups. Johnston only played six games due to a knee injury that ended his season early. He was again named to the second-team All-Big 12.

== Professional career ==
Pre-draft measurables
Height	Weight	Arm length	Hand span	Bench press
6 ft 1 in (1.85 m)	227 lb (103 kg)	30 1/2 in (0.77 m)	9 in (0.23 m)	18 reps
All values from NFL Combine

=== Los Angeles Rams ===
Johnston was selected by the Los Angeles Rams in the seventh round (234th overall) of the 2020 NFL draft. He was waived on September 5, 2020.

=== Carolina Panthers ===
On September 8, 2020, Johnston was signed to the Carolina Panthers' practice squad. He was elevated to the active roster on December 26 and January 2, 2021, for the team's weeks 16 and 17 games against the Washington Football Team and New Orleans Saints, and reverted to the practice squad after each game. He signed a reserve/future contract with the Panthers on January 4, 2021.

Johnston made the Panthers 53-man roster in 2021 as a backup linebacker and special teamer. He played in six games before being waived on November 8, 2021.

=== Cincinnati Bengals ===
On November 9, 2021, Johnston was claimed off waivers by the Cincinnati Bengals. He played in Super Bowl LVI, recording one tackle.

Johnston played in 23 regular-season games, making one start for the Bengals from 2021 to 2022, recording 11 defensive tackles and 14 special teams tackles. He led the NFL in tackles during the 2022 preseason.

Johnston was signed to the Bengals practice squad on November 1, 2023. He was not signed to a reserve/future contract after the season and thus became a free agent when his practice squad contract expired.

== Personal life ==
His father, Kent Johnston, was a strength coach for over two decades in the NFL, and was also Brett Favre’s best man for his wedding. He has three brothers Kody, Kole, and Cade. Kody played collegiate football at Texas A&M University and Kole participated in collegiate football at Tarleton State University.
