= Grayland Arnold =

American football player (born 1997)

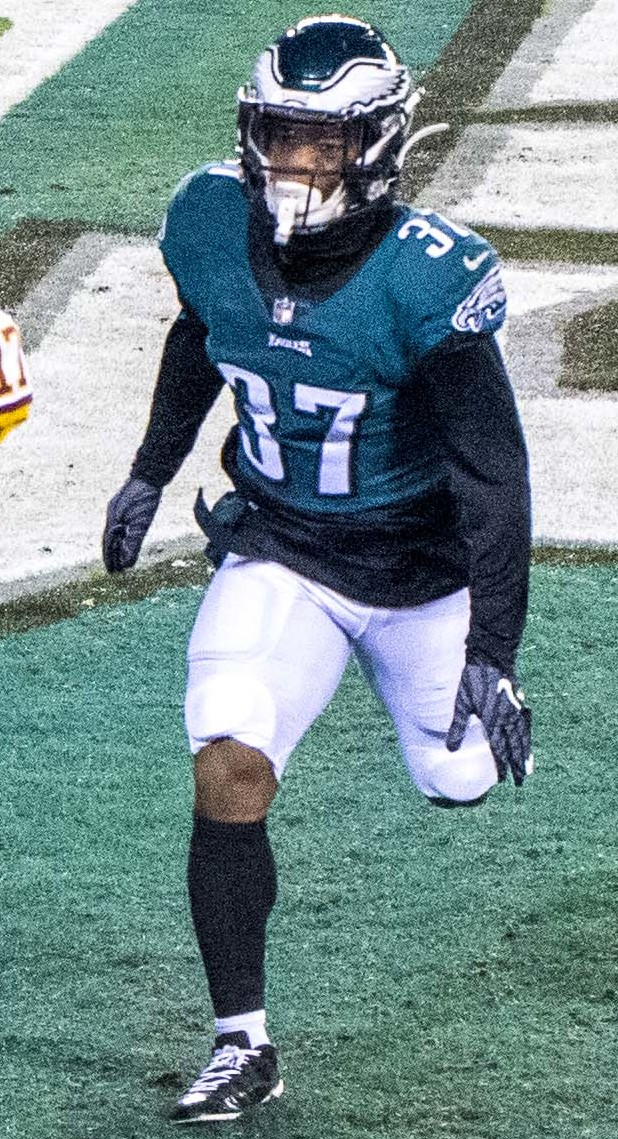
- Arnold with the Philadelphia Eagles in 2020

No. 0 – BC Lions
- Position: Safety
- Roster status: Active

Personal information
- Born: September 4, 1997 (age 29); Kountze, Texas, U.S.
- Listed height: 5 ft 10 in (1.78 m)
- Listed weight: 190 lb (86 kg)

Career information
- High school: Kountze
- College: Baylor (2016–2019)
- NFL draft: 2020: undrafted

Career history
- Philadelphia Eagles (2020); Houston Texans (2021–2023); Pittsburgh Steelers (2024)*; Atlanta Falcons (2025)*; BC Lions (2026–present)
- * Offseason or practice squad member only

Awards and highlights
- Second-team All-Big 12 (2019)

Career NFL statistics as of 2025
- Total tackles: 33
- Forced fumbles: 1
- Stats at Pro Football Reference

Grayland Arnold Jr. (born September 4, 1997) is an American professional football safety for the BC Lions of the Canadian Football League (CFL). He played college football for the Baylor Bears.

== Early life ==
Arnold attended Kountze High School. On the basketball court, he was a two-time All-State selection, District 23-3A Most Valuable Player and named of the top 15 basketball players in Texas. During his freshman year, former NFL player Frank Middleton, who was an assistant coach, convinced him to join the football team. Arnold ended up becoming an All-State selection at cornerback, in addition to earning District Offensive MVP honors as a quarterback and wide receiver. He was a three-star prospect and committed to Baylor.

== College career ==
Arnold had nine tackles in a win against Boise State in the 2016 Cactus Bowl. As a freshman at Baylor in 2016, Arnold started four of 11 games and tallied 20 tackles and four pass breakups. His sophomore season was hampered due to a broken arm which forced him to miss several games. He finished the season with 35 tackles, seven pass break ups and an interception. As a junior in 2018, Arnold also suffered an ankle injury which ended the season after four games, forcing him to redshirt. He was named Big 12 Special Teams player of the week in week two of the 2019 season. In 2019, Arnold ranked second in the Big 12 with six interceptions, and also recorded 46 total tackles, 2.5 tackles for a loss and two pass breakups. He also averaged 12.4 yards on punt returns with one touchdown. Arnold was named to the Second-team All-Big 12. Following the season, he announced he was forgoing his redshirt senior season and entering the NFL draft. In his career, Arnold had 107 total tackles, 7.5 tackles for a loss and seven interceptions. He was invited to the NFL Scouting Combine.

== Professional career ==
Pre-draft measurables
Height	Weight	Arm length	Hand span	40-yard dash	10-yard split	20-yard split	20-yard shuttle	Three-cone drill	Vertical jump	Broad jump	Bench press
5 ft 9 1/8 in (1.76 m)	186 lb (84 kg)	29 in (0.74 m)	9 1/8 in (0.23 m)	4.59 s	1.51 s	2.71 s	4.30 s	7.01 s	33.0 in (0.84 m)	10 ft 0 in (3.05 m)	12 reps
All values from NFL Combine

=== Philadelphia Eagles ===
in the 2020 NFL draft, Arnold signed a three-year deal with the Philadelphia Eagles on April 26, 2020. He was named the Eagles' best undrafted free agent by CBS Sports, with scouts praising his versatility. Arnold was waived on September 3, 2020, and re-signed to the team's practice squad three days later. Arnold was elevated to the active roster on September 26 for the team's week 3 game against the Cincinnati Bengals. He made his debut in the game, playing 12 snaps on special teams, and reverted to the practice squad after the game. Arnold was elevated again on October 3 for the week 4 game against the San Francisco 49ers, and reverted to the practice squad again following the game. Arnold was promoted to the active roster on October 10, 2020. He was waived on October 13 and re-signed to the practice squad two days later. He was promoted to the active roster on December 1, 2020.

On August 31, 2021, Arnold was waived by the Eagles and re-signed to the practice squad the next day. He was released on September 3.

=== Houston Texans ===
On September 15, 2021, Arnold was signed to the Houston Texans practice squad. On December 11, Arnold was elevated to the active roster from the practice squad and made his debut against the Seattle Seahawks. He was signed to the active roster on December 23. On December 29, Arnold signed a contract extension with the Texans that runs through the 2022 season. On January 3, 2022, Arnold was placed on injured reserve after suffering an ankle injury in the team's week 16 game against the 49ers.

On August 30, 2022, Arnold was waived by the Texans and signed to the practice squad the next day. He was promoted to the active roster on October 1. He was placed on injured reserve on November 3. He was activated on December 23.

=== Pittsburgh Steelers ===
On June 5, 2024, Arnold signed a one-year contract with the Pittsburgh Steelers. He was placed on injured reserve on August 15, and later released.

=== Atlanta Falcons ===
On August 2, 2025, Arnold signed with the Atlanta Falcons. He was placed on injured reserve on August 10, and released on September 5.

=== BC Lions ===
On September 29, 2026, Arnold signed a futures contract with the BC Lions of the Canadian Football League (CFL).

== Personal life ==
Arnold's older sister Gabriell Mattox played college basketball at Texas.
