= 2019 Kansas Jayhawks football team =

American college football season

2019 Kansas Jayhawks football
- Conference: Big 12 Conference
- Record: 3–9 (1–8 Big 12)
- Head coach: Les Miles (1st season)
- Offensive coordinator: Les Koenning (1st season; first 6 games); Brent Dearmon (1st season; final 6 games)
- Offensive scheme: Power spread
- Defensive coordinator: D. J. Eliot (1st season)
- Base defense: 3–4
- Home stadium: David Booth Kansas Memorial Stadium

Uniform
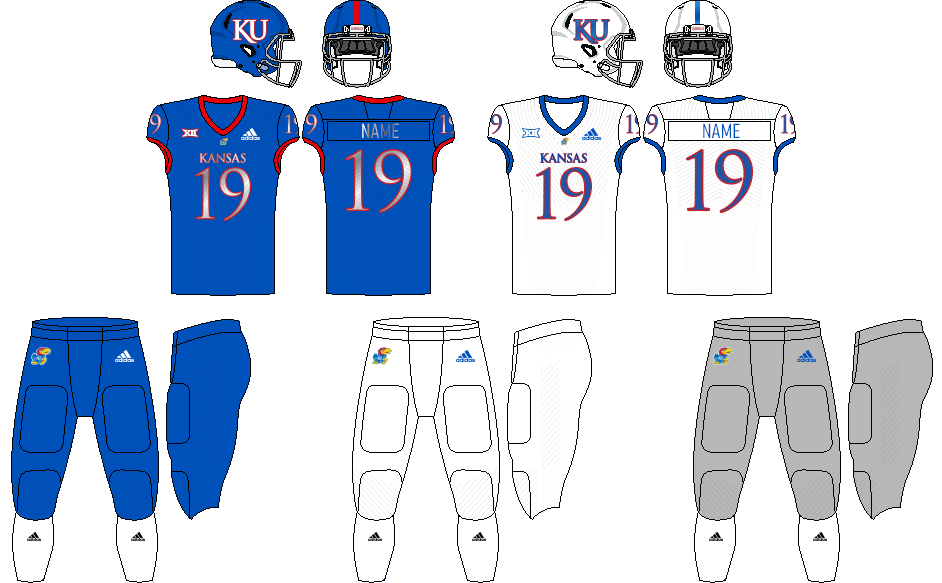

2019 Big 12 Conference football standings
	Conf.			Overall
Team	W		L	W		L
No. 7 Oklahoma y$^	8	–	1	12	–	2
No. 13 Baylor y	8	–	1	11	–	3
No. 25 Texas	5	–	4	8	–	5
Oklahoma State	5	–	4	8	–	5
Kansas State	5	–	4	8	–	5
Iowa State	5	–	4	7	–	6
West Virginia	3	–	6	5	–	7
TCU	3	–	6	5	–	7
Texas Tech	2	–	7	4	–	8
Kansas	1	–	8	3	–	9
Championship: Oklahoma 30, Baylor 23 ^{OT}
^ – College Football Playoff participant; $ – Conference champion; y – Championship game participant; Rankings from AP Poll

The 2019 Kansas Jayhawks football team, representing the University of Kansas for the 130th season, was led by first-year head coach Les Miles. Members of the Big 12 Conference during the 2019 NCAA Division I FBS football season, the Jayhawks played their home games at David Booth Kansas Memorial Stadium. Their season was chronicled by ESPN+ in the docuseries Miles to Go: Les Miles and Kansas Football.

The Jayhawks attempted to end two major losing streaks, but instead extended the streaks. They extended their consecutive losses on the road to Big 12 teams to 45 games. They also extended their streak of consecutive games lost to teams ranked in the AP poll to 38. With a 48–24 win over Boston College, KU ended a 48-game road losing streak against power five conference teams. With the Jayhawks seventh loss of the season to Oklahoma State, they became ineligible for a bowl game for the eleventh consecutive season, the last time they were eligible was the 2008 season. They finished the season 3–9, 1–8 in Big 12 play to finish in last place.

On July 8, 2019, Kansas announced that 1st team All-Big 12 running back Pooka Williams Jr. would be suspended for the first game of the season against Indiana State as discipline for his arrest for domestic battery in December 2018.

On October 6, 2019, Miles fired offensive coordinator Les Koenning. Senior offensive analyst Brent Dearmon was promoted to replace him. Additionally, Dearmon was named quarterbacks coach.

== Preseason ==
=== Big 12 media poll ===
The 2019 Big 12 media days were held July 15–16, 2019 in Frisco, Texas. In the Big 12 preseason media poll, Kansas was predicted to finish in last in the standings.

== Schedule ==
Date	Time	Opponent	Site	TV	Result	Attendance
August 31	11:00 a.m.	No. 16 (FCS) Indiana State*	David Booth Kansas Memorial Stadium; Lawrence, KS	FSN	W 24–17	32,611
September 7	6:00 p.m.	Coastal Carolina*	David Booth Kansas Memorial Stadium; Lawrence, KS	ESPN+	L 7–12	33,493
September 13	6:30 p.m.	at Boston College*	Alumni Stadium; Chestnut Hill, MA	ACCN	W 48–24	32,848
September 21	3:30 p.m.	West Virginia	David Booth Kansas Memorial Stadium; Lawrence, KS	ESPN+	L 24–29	35,816
September 28	11:00 a.m.	at TCU	Amon G. Carter Stadium; Fort Worth, TX	FS1	L 14–51	41,960
October 5	11:00 a.m.	No. 6 Oklahoma	David Booth Kansas Memorial Stadium; Lawrence, Kansas	ABC	L 20–45	34,402
October 19	6:00 p.m.	at No. 15 Texas	Darrell K Royal–Texas Memorial Stadium; Austin, TX	LHN	L 48–50	97,137
October 26	6:00 p.m.	Texas Tech^{†}	David Booth Kansas Memorial Stadium; Lawrence, KS	FS1	W 37–34	31,036
November 2	2:30 p.m.	No. 22 Kansas State	David Booth Kansas Memorial Stadium; Lawrence, KS (Sunflower Showdown)	FS1	L 10–38	47,233
November 16	11:00 a.m.	at No. 22 Oklahoma State	Boone Pickens Stadium; Stillwater, OK	FS1	L 13–31	55,388
November 23	11:00 a.m.	at No. 22 Iowa State	Jack Trice Stadium; Ames, IA	FSN	L 31–41	58,210
November 30	2:30 p.m.	No. 9 Baylor	David Booth Kansas Memorial Stadium; Lawrence, KS	ESPN	L 6–61	22,531
*Non-conference game; ^{†}Homecoming; Rankings from AP Poll and CFP Rankings after November 5 released prior to game; All times are in Central time

== Game summaries ==
=== No. 16 (FCS) Indiana State ===
	1	2	3	4	Total
No. 16 (FCS) Sycamores	0	3	0	14	17
Jayhawks	7	3	6	8	24

Statistics	INST	KU
First downs	20	20
Total yards	365	344
Rushing yards	146	103
Passing yards	219	241
Turnovers	2	3
Time of possession	31:25	28:35

Team	Category	Player	Statistics
Indiana State	Passing	Ryan Boyle	22/34, 219 yards, TD, 2 INT
Indiana State	Rushing	Titus McCoy	14 rushes, 88 yards
Indiana State	Receiving	Dante Jones II	4 receptions, 79 yards, TD
Kansas	Passing	Carter Stanley	20/29, 241 yards, 2 TD
Kansas	Rushing	Khalil Herbert	17 rushes, 88 yards
Kansas	Receiving	Andrew Parchment	8 receptions, 121 yards

=== Coastal Carolina ===
	1	2	3	4	Total
Chanticleers	0	6	6	0	12
Jayhawks	7	0	0	0	7

Statistics	CCU	KU
First downs	20	17
Total yards	291	280
Rushing yards	172	173
Passing yards	119	107
Turnovers	0	2
Time of possession	34:26	25:34

Team	Category	Player	Statistics
Coastal Carolina	Passing	Fred Payton	6/9, 98 yards, TD
Coastal Carolina	Rushing	C. J. Marable	24 rushes, 148 yards, TD
Coastal Carolina	Receiving	Isaiah Likely	2 receptions, 46 yards
Kansas	Passing	Carter Stanley	13/19, 107 yards, 2 INT
Kansas	Rushing	Pooka Williams Jr.	22 rushes, 99 yards
Kansas	Receiving	Stephon Robinson Jr.	4 receptions, 45 yards

=== At Boston College ===
	1	2	3	4	Total
Jayhawks	7	21	13	7	48
Eagles	17	7	0	0	24

Statistics	KU	BC
First downs	23	26
Total yards	567	447
Rushing yards	329	228
Passing yards	238	219
Turnovers	1	0
Time of possession	31:53	28:07

Team	Category	Player	Statistics
Kansas	Passing	Carter Stanley	20/27, 238 yards, 3 TD, INT
Kansas	Rushing	Khalil Herbert	11 rushes, 187 yards, TD
Kansas	Receiving	Andrew Parchment	8 receptions, 100 yards, 2 TD
Boston College	Passing	Anthony Brown	18/36, 195 yards, TD
Boston College	Rushing	A. J. Dillon	27 rushes, 151 yards, TD
Boston College	Receiving	Hunter Long	2 receptions, 48 yards

The Kansas Jayhawks came into the game as a three touchdown underdog, but performances by quarterback Carter Stanley (238 yards passing) and running back Pooka Williams (121 yards rushing) combined with other efforts to give the Jayhawks their first road win against a "power 5" team in almost 11 years.

Boston College scored first and had the lead 10-0 until the Jayhawks scored on six straight possessions. Kansas took the lead 28–24 at the half thanks to an 82-yard run with 40 seconds remaining before the break to set up a 3-yard score just two plays later. Kansas continued to score in the second half but Boston College could not match the effort. The final score was Kansas 48, Boston College 24.

=== West Virginia ===
	1	2	3	4	Total
Mountaineers	7	3	10	9	29
Jayhawks	0	7	10	7	24

Statistics	WVU	KU
First downs	25	20
Total yards	394	417
Rushing yards	192	142
Passing yards	202	275
Turnovers	0	2
Time of possession	37:41	22:19

Team	Category	Player	Statistics
West Virginia	Passing	Austin Kendall	25/37, 202 yards
West Virginia	Rushing	Kennedy McKoy	20 rushes, 73 yards, TD
West Virginia	Receiving	T. J. Simmons	4 receptions, 46 yards
Kansas	Passing	Carter Stanley	19/25, 275 yards, 3 TD, INT
Kansas	Rushing	Pooka Williams Jr.	15 rushes, 76 yards
Kansas	Receiving	Andrew Parchment	5 receptions, 132 yards, 2 TD

Kansas started conference play having just rolled off a win against Boston College, but West Virginia was expected to take advantage of observing the Jayhawks offensive performance the prior week.

When the game rolled around, the Jayhawk offense made two specific mistakes that impacted the game: A lost fumble and a fourth quarter interception. On the positive side, KU averaged 7.4 yards per play. It also appeared that KU kicker Liam Jones faked an injury after a field goal to make way for Jacob Borcila to "replace" him at the next kickoff to execute an onside kick—which they recovered but then lost due to a penalty. West Virginia won the game 29–24.

=== At TCU ===
	1	2	3	4	Total
Jayhawks	0	0	0	14	14
Horned Frogs	21	17	0	13	51

Statistics	KU	TCU
First downs	8	29
Total yards	159	625
Rushing yards	75	319
Passing yards	84	306
Turnovers	0	0
Time of possession	20:25	39:35

Team	Category	Player	Statistics
Kansas	Passing	Carter Stanley	12/29, 84 yards, TD
Kansas	Rushing	Velton Gardner	4 rushes, 61 yards, TD
Kansas	Receiving	Pooka Williams Jr.	3 receptions, 33 yards, TD
TCU	Passing	Alex Delton	10/15, 186 yards
TCU	Rushing	Darius Anderson	18 rushes, 115 yards, TD
TCU	Receiving	Derius Davis	2 receptions, 85 yards

Texas Christian scored 21 points in the first quarter against Kansas and led 38–0 at halftime, with Max Duggan making his second consecutive start at quarterback. However, Alex Delton still was on record as a team captain and he saw play time in the second half. Headed into the fourth quarter with no score, Kansas had only managed 55 yards on 34 plays. Quarterback Carter Stanley finished 12–29 in passing with 84 yards, but the Jayhawks managed to score in the fourth quarter to avoid being shut out. The game ended with TCU scoring 51 to the Jayhawks 14.

=== No. 6 Oklahoma ===
	1	2	3	4	Total
No. 6 Sooners	7	14	14	10	45
Jayhawks	7	0	0	13	20

Statistics	OU	KU
First downs	29	18
Total yards	545	360
Rushing yards	268	130
Passing yards	277	230
Turnovers	1	0
Time of possession	29:31	30:29

Team	Category	Player	Statistics
Oklahoma	Passing	Jalen Hurts	16/24, 228 yards, 2 TD, INT
Oklahoma	Rushing	Rhamondre Stevenson	5 rushes, 109 yards, TD
Oklahoma	Receiving	Brayden Willis	2 receptions, 38 yards
Kansas	Passing	Carter Stanley	18/28, 230 yards, 3 TD
Kansas	Rushing	Pooka Williams Jr.	23 rushes, 137 yards
Kansas	Receiving	Stephon Robinson Jr.	5 receptions, 131 yards, 2 TD

Oklahoma traveled to Lawrence for what resulted in an "easy victory" for the Sooners, but Kansas "outplayed" the sooners for the bulk of the first quarter. Kansas even scored first with a touchdown after forcing Oklahoma to punt. Kansas then gained 98 yards for their touchdown and led 7–0 in the first quarter. Oklahoma then took control and led 21–7 at halftime.

Oklahoma managed 29 first downs and converted 6 of 9 times on third down, with 545 total yards of offense. Oklahoma also threw an interception for the only turnover of the game. Kansas only managed 18 first downs with 6–14 on third down. They also attempted 2 fourth-down conversions but both were unsuccessful, with a total of 360 yards of offense. Kansas did manage a little more clock time of offense with 30:29 time of possession compared to Oklahoma's 29:31. The final score was Oklahoma 45, Kansas 20.

Oklahoma completed their 22nd straight true road win, which was the second longest streak since at least World War II in major college football when Coach Bud Wilkinson led the sooners to 25 wins from 1953 to 1958.

=== At No. 15 Texas ===
	1	2	3	4	Total
Jayhawks	3	14	7	24	48
No. 15 Longhorns	14	7	3	26	50

Statistics	KU	TEX
First downs	27	33
Total yards	569	638
Rushing yards	259	239
Passing yards	310	399
Turnovers	0	2
Time of possession	31:31	28:29

Team	Category	Player	Statistics
Kansas	Passing	Carter Stanley	27/47, 310 yards, 4 TD
Kansas	Rushing	Pooka Williams Jr.	25 rushes, 190 yards, 2 TD
Kansas	Receiving	Andrew Parchment	3 receptions, 83 yards, TD
Texas	Passing	Sam Ehlinger	31/44, 399 yards, 4 TD, INT
Texas	Rushing	Keaontay Ingram	14 rushes, 101 yards, TD
Texas	Receiving	Devin Duvernay	8 receptions, 110 yards, 2 TD

The underdog Kansas Jayhawks stayed with the #15 Texas Longhorns for four quarters of play. In the last minutes, Carter Stanley was successful with a 22-yard scoring pass to Stephon Robinson. The following 2-point conversion throw to Daylon Charlot put the Jayhawks ahead by one point. With 1:11 left to play when Texas took over and put together an offensive drive that ended with a game-winning field goal for the Longhorns.

Even with the loss, several of the Kansas players gave great performances: Pooka Williams rushed for 190 yards and two touchdowns; quarterback Carter Stanley threw 310 yards and four touchdowns for the Jayhawks. For the Longhorns, Sam Ehlinger rushed for 91 yards and managed 399 yards passing with four touchdowns. When everything was complete, Texas won by a score of 50–48.

=== Texas Tech ===
	1	2	3	4	Total
Red Raiders	7	10	10	7	34
Jayhawks	0	14	6	17	37

Statistics	TTU	KU
First downs	28	22
Total yards	483	527
Rushing yards	212	112
Passing yards	271	415
Turnovers	1	1
Time of possession	32:28	27:32

Team	Category	Player	Statistics
Texas Tech	Passing	Jett Duffey	23/34, 271 yards, 3 TD
Texas Tech	Rushing	SaRodorick Thompson	20 rushes, 80 yards, TD
Texas Tech	Receiving	Dalton Rigdon	7 receptions, 76 yards, TD
Kansas	Passing	Carter Stanley	26/37, 415 yards, 3 TD, INT
Kansas	Rushing	Pooka Williams Jr.	21 rushes, 69 yards
Kansas	Receiving	Stephon Robinson Jr.	6 receptions, 186 yards, 2 TD

Texas Tech controlled the game early, racing to a 17–0 lead in the second quarter before Kansas quarterback Carter Stanley scored 2 touchdowns, 1 rushing and 1 passing, in the final 5 minutes of the half to go into halftime down 17–14. Texas Tech would similarly dominate the early part of the second half, scoring 10 unanswered points, before being answered with two long touchdown passes by Stanley to tie the game at 27. After each team scored another touchdown, Kansas would force a Texas Tech punt and then drove to the Texas Tech 22 with 13 seconds left. With the score tied 34 each, Texas Tech blocked a field goal attempt—but when Douglas Coleman of Texas Tech fumbled during an attempt to return the field goal it gave the Jayhawks a second chance with better field position. Texas Tech successfully blocked the first 40-yard field goal attempt and Coleman caught the ball, who then tried to lateral the ball to another teammate. However, the lateral went in the direction where no Red Raider player was and Kansas recovered the ball. Kicker Liam Jones then got another chance to win the game and was successful. The final score was Texas Tech 34, Kansas 37.

The Kansas offense scored on four of its last five possessions to overcome a 17-point deficit. The win was the first Big 12 Conference victory for Les Miles while as the coach at Kansas, and the first Homecoming victory for Kansas since October 10, 2009. Jones won Big 12 Special Teams player of the week honors thanks to his game-winning kick, while Stanley's 415 yard, 4 touchdown performance made him the Big 12 Offensive player of the week.

Texas Tech's coach Matt Wells praised Jayhawk coach Les Miles after the game: "I think Coach Miles brings credibility to that program. I mean, the job that he obviously did at Oklahoma State and did at LSU speaks for itself. He's had success everywhere he's been. And those kids played hard on Saturday. They really did. They went out and, man, they did. They emptied the tank and had every right to win and deserved to win."

=== No. 22 Kansas State ===
	1	2	3	4	Total
No. 22 Wildcats	7	10	7	14	38
Jayhawks	3	0	0	7	10

Statistics	KSU	KU
First downs	23	12
Total yards	471	241
Rushing yards	342	61
Passing yards	129	180
Turnovers	0	2
Time of possession	38:03	21:57

Team	Category	Player	Statistics
Kansas State	Passing	Skylar Thompson	9/16, 129 yards
Kansas State	Rushing	Skylar Thompson	17 rushes, 127 yards, 3 TD
Kansas State	Receiving	Dalton Schoen	2 receptions, 67 yards
Kansas	Passing	Carter Stanley	13/23, 115 yards, 2 INT
Kansas	Rushing	Pooka Williams Jr.	14 rushes, 61 yards
Kansas	Receiving	Stephon Robinson Jr.	4 receptions, 62 yards

Both Kansas and Kansas State entered the 2019 Sunflower Showdown coming off wins: Kansas State defeating Oklahoma and Kansas defeating Texas Tech.

Kansas State scored a touchdown on its first possession and held the lead for the remainder of the game. Kansas State's offensive line was praised for their control of the line of scrimmage to help the Wildcats rush for 342 yards and five touchdowns. On Defense, Kansas State held their rival Jayhawks to just 10 points. Defensivley, Kansas State also pulled two interceptions and sacked Kansas quarterback Carter Stanley four times. Stanley's passing production was 13-for-23 with 123 yards, a far cry from the over 400 yards against Texas Tech and over 300 yards he put up against the Texas Longhorns in recent play.

The Kansas Jayhawks entered the game with high hopes and expectations--"convinced" that they would win largely based on performance in their previous two games. However, the Jayhawks only managed a field goal in the first quarter and did not score again until they managed a touchdown in the fourth quarter. That touchdown was the final score of the game: Kansas State 38; Kansas 10.

=== At No. 22 Oklahoma State ===
	1	2	3	4	Total
Jayhawks	0	0	0	13	13
No. 22 Cowboys	14	10	7	0	31

Statistics	KU	OKST
First downs	18	23
Total yards	290	447
Rushing yards	39	209
Passing yards	251	238
Turnovers	3	0
Time of possession	28:28	31:32

Team	Category	Player	Statistics
Kansas	Passing	Carter Stanley	22/37, 226 yards, 2 TD, INT
Kansas	Rushing	Pooka Williams Jr.	12 rushes, 26 yards
Kansas	Receiving	Stephon Robinson Jr.	6 receptions, 68 yards, TD
Oklahoma State	Passing	Spencer Sanders	12/18, 168 yards, TD
Oklahoma State	Rushing	Chuba Hubbard	23 rushes, 122 yards, 2 TD
Oklahoma State	Receiving	Dillon Stoner	5 receptions, 150 yards, 2 TD

=== At No. 22 Iowa State ===
	1	2	3	4	Total
Jayhawks	6	3	15	7	31
No. 22 Cyclones	7	7	7	20	41

Statistics	KU	ISU
First downs	22	24
Total yards	493	489
Rushing yards	165	117
Passing yards	328	372
Turnovers	0	1
Time of possession	25:43	34:17

Team	Category	Player	Statistics
Kansas	Passing	Carter Stanley	23/44, 328 yards, 3 TD
Kansas	Rushing	Pooka Williams Jr.	19 rushes, 154 yards
Kansas	Receiving	Andrew Parchment	8 receptions, 86 yards
Iowa State	Passing	Brock Purdy	29/42, 372 yards, 4 TD, INT
Iowa State	Rushing	Breece Hall	28 rushes, 97 yards, TD
Iowa State	Receiving	Charlie Kolar	6 receptions, 100 yards

=== No. 9 Baylor ===
	1	2	3	4	Total
No. 9 Bears	21	13	14	13	61
Jayhawks	0	0	6	0	6

Statistics	BAY	KU
First downs	29	17
Total yards	507	258
Rushing yards	264	161
Passing yards	243	119
Turnovers	1	6
Time of possession	33:46	26:14

Team	Category	Player	Statistics
Baylor	Passing	Charlie Brewer	13/25, 182 yards, TD, INT
Baylor	Rushing	JaMycal Hasty	14 rushes, 92 yards, 3 TD
Baylor	Receiving	Tyquan Thornton	4 receptions, 69 yards, TD
Kansas	Passing	Carter Stanley	13/26, 95 yards, 3 INT
Kansas	Rushing	Pooka Williams Jr.	22 rushes, 116 yards
Kansas	Receiving	Andrew Parchment	5 receptions, 43 yards, TD

== Coaching staff ==
Name	Position
Les Miles	Head coach
Brent Dearmon	Offensive coordinator/quarterbacks
D.J. Eliot	Defensive coordinator
Todd Bradford	Linebackers
Mike Ekeler	Special Teams
Emmett Jones	Wide Receivers
Tony Hull	Running Backs/Associate head coach
Chevis Jackson	Defensive Backs
Clint Bowen	Safeties
Kwahn Drake	Defensive Line
Luke Meadows	Offensive Line
Travis Partridge	Offensive quality control
Chidera Uzo-Diribe	Defensive quality control
Zac Woodfin	Director of football strength and Conditioning

== Awards and honors ==
=== All-Big 12 selections ===
- Hakeem Adeniji, T, 1st team
- Hasan Defense, CB, Honorable mention
- Azur Kamara, LB, Honorable mention
- Mike Lee, S, Honorable mention
- Ben Miles, FB, Honorable mention
- Andrew Parchment, WR, Honorable mention
- Kyle Thompson, P, Honorable mention
- Pooka Williams Jr., RB, 1st team
