= 2019 Texas Tech Red Raiders football team =

American college football season

2019 Texas Tech Red Raiders football
- Conference: Big 12 Conference
- Record: 4–8 (2–7 Big 12)
- Head coach: Matt Wells (1st season)
- Offensive coordinator: David Yost (1st season)
- Offensive scheme: Hurry-up spread
- Defensive coordinator: Keith Patterson (1st season)
- Base defense: 3–3–5
- Captain: 16: Jordyn Brooks; Travis Bruffy; Douglas Coleman III; Terence Steele; Broderick Washington Jr.; Jack Anderson; Eli Howard; Riko Jeffers; Thomas Leggett; Jax Welch; Alan Bowman; Adrian Frye; Ta'Zhawn Henry; Xavier Benson; Erik Ezukanma; SaRodorick Thompson
- Home stadium: Jones AT&T Stadium

2019 Big 12 Conference football standings
	Conf.			Overall
Team	W		L	W		L
No. 7 Oklahoma y$^	8	–	1	12	–	2
No. 13 Baylor y	8	–	1	11	–	3
No. 25 Texas	5	–	4	8	–	5
Oklahoma State	5	–	4	8	–	5
Kansas State	5	–	4	8	–	5
Iowa State	5	–	4	7	–	6
West Virginia	3	–	6	5	–	7
TCU	3	–	6	5	–	7
Texas Tech	2	–	7	4	–	8
Kansas	1	–	8	3	–	9
Championship: Oklahoma 30, Baylor 23 ^{OT}
^ – College Football Playoff participant; $ – Conference champion; y – Championship game participant; Rankings from AP Poll

The 2019 Texas Tech Red Raiders football team represented Texas Tech University in the 2019 NCAA Division I FBS football season. The team was led by Matt Wells in his first season as the program's 16th head coach. The Red Raiders played their home games on the university's campus in Lubbock, Texas at Jones AT&T Stadium, and competed as members of the Big 12 Conference. They finished the season 4–8, 2–7 in Big 12 play to finish in ninth place.

== Preseason ==
=== Coaching changes ===
Following a 24–35 loss to Baylor in the last game of the 2018 season, head coach Kliff Kingsbury was fired on November 26, 2018. Three days later on November 29, Matt Wells was hired as the Red Raiders' new head coach, having previously been the head coach for the Utah State Aggies. David Yost and Keith Patterson, who both worked with Wells at Utah State, were hired as the team's new offensive coordinator and defensive coordinator, respectively.

=== Big 12 media poll ===
The 2019 Big 12 media days were held July 15–16, 2019 in Frisco, Texas. In the Big 12 preseason media poll, Texas Tech was predicted to finish in seventh in the standings.

=== Preseason All-Big 12 teams ===
Offensive lineman Jack Anderson and defensive back Adrian Frye were selected to the Big 12's preseason all-conference team.

== Schedule ==
Date	Time	Opponent	Site	TV	Result	Attendance
August 31	3:00 p.m.	No. 14 (FCS) Montana State*	Jones AT&T Stadium; Lubbock, TX	FSN	W 45–10	54,183
September 7	7:00 p.m.	UTEP*	Jones AT&T Stadium; Lubbock, TX	FSN	W 38–3	56,957
September 14	9:30 p.m.	at Arizona*	Arizona Stadium; Tucson, AZ	ESPN	L 14–28	37,307
September 28	11:00 a.m.	at No. 6 Oklahoma	Gaylord Family Oklahoma Memorial Stadium; Norman, OK	Fox	L 16–55	84,416
October 5	11:00 a.m.	No. 21 Oklahoma State	Jones AT&T Stadium; Lubbock, TX	FS1	W 45–35	56,479
October 12	3:00 p.m.	at No. 22 Baylor	McLane Stadium; Waco, TX (rivalry)	FS1	L 30–33 ^{2OT}	47,264
October 19	11:00 a.m.	Iowa State^{†}	Jones AT&T Stadium; Lubbock, TX	FS1	L 24–34	52,315
October 26	6:00 p.m.	at Kansas	David Booth Kansas Memorial Stadium; Lawrence, KS	FS1	L 34–37	31,036
November 9	11:00 a.m.	at West Virginia	Mountaineer Field at Milan Puskar Stadium; Morgantown, WV	ESPN2	W 38–17	56,573
November 16	11:00 a.m.	TCU	Jones AT&T Stadium; Lubbock, TX (rivalry)	ESPN2	L 31–33	50,459
November 23	6:00 p.m.	Kansas State	Jones AT&T Stadium; Lubbock, TX	FS1	L 27–30	50,117
November 29	11:00 a.m.	at Texas	Darrell K Royal–Texas Memorial Stadium; Austin, TX (rivalry)	Fox	L 24–49	93,747
*Non-conference game; ^{†}Homecoming; Rankings from AP Poll and CFP Rankings after November 5 released prior to game; All times are in Central time

== Coaching staff ==
Name	Position	Year at Texas Tech	Alma mater
Matt Wells	Head coach	1st	Utah State
David Yost	Offensive coordinator/quarterbacks	1st	Dayton
Keith Patterson	Defensive coordinator/linebackers	1st	East Central
Jovon Bouknight	Outside receivers	1st	Wyoming
Julius Brown	Defensive backs	1st	Boise State
Steve Farmer	Offensive line	1st	Illinois State
DeAndre Smith	Running backs	1st	Southwest Missouri State
Luke Wells	Tight ends/Inside Receivers	1st	Oklahoma
Dave Scholz	Strength and conditioning	1st	Wisconsin–Eau Claire
Joe Lorig	Special teams Coordinator	1st	Western Oregon

== Roster ==
2019 Texas Tech Red Raiders Football
Quarterbacks: 7 Jett Duffey – junior (6'1, 195); 8 Maverick McIvor – freshman (6'3, 195); 10 Alan Bowman – (redshirt) sophomore (6'3, 210); 16 Logan Green – freshman (6'3, 205); 17 Jackson Tyner – senior (6'5, 230); Running backs: 5 Armand Shyne – junior (5'11, 210); 26 Ta'Zhawn Henry – sophomore (5'7, 185); 28 SaRodorick Thompson – (redshirt) freshman (6'0, 210); 30 Jax Welch – junior (5'9, 185); 37 Chux Nwabuko III – freshman (5'6, 150); Fullbacks: 40 Connor Killian – junior (6'2, 240); Wide receivers: 2 R.J. Turner – senior (6'2, 215); 3 Xavier Martin – sophomore (6'0, 190); 9 T. J. Vasher – junior (6'6, 210); 13 McLane Mannix – junior (5'10, 195); 18 Cameron Cantrell – freshman (6'1, 195); 22 Seth Collins – senior (6'3, 195); 24 Xavier White – sophomore (5'11, 185); 29 Kendell Jimerson – (redshirt) freshman (5'10, 170); 31 Dax Neece – (redshirt) freshman (6'0, 195); 32 Caleb Durham – freshman (5'10, 170); 35 Mark Richardson – sophomore (6'0, 195); 80 Kevin Terry – (redshirt) freshman (6'1, 195); 82 Kesean Carter – sophomore (5,11, 180); 83 Myller Royals – (redshirt) freshman (6'5, 180); 84 Erik Ezukanma – (redshirt) freshman (6'3, 180); 85 Trey Cleveland – freshman (6'4, 190); 86 Dalton Rigdon – sophomore (5'11, 170); 87 Sterling Galban – (redshirt) freshman (5'11, 170); 89 Caden Leggett – (redshirt) freshman (6'1, 185); Tight ends: 11 Donta Thompson – senior (6'5, 225); 15 Travis Koontz – junior (6'5, 245); 41 Tyler Carr – sophomore (6'4, 240); 47 Mason McHorse – (redshirt) freshman (6'4, 230); 88 Simon Gonzalez – freshman (6'4, 235); Long snappers: 46 Hayden Hood – freshman (6'0, 195); 50 Landon O'Connor – sophomore (6'2, 210); 54 Luke Rizzo – freshman (6'0, 215)	Offensive linemen: 53 Trevor Roberson – freshman (6'11, 345); 56 Jack Anderson – junior (6'5, 320); 57 Ty Morrow – senior (6'4, 275); 58 Madison Akamnonu – senior (6'5, 310); 59 Demarcus Marshall – (redshirt) freshman (6'3, 320); 60 C.J. Zotz – freshman (6'3, 275); 63 Aaron Castro – freshman (6'3, 285); 64 Clayton Franks – (redshirt) freshman (6'4, 295); 65 Zach Adams – junior (6'6, 320); 66 Hakeem White – (redshirt) freshman (6'3, 285); 67 Troy Bradshaw – (redshirt) freshman (6'6, 280); 68 Casey Verhulst – sophomore (6'6, 290); 70 Weston Wright – (redshirt) freshman (6'6, 310); 71 Bailey Smith – senior (6'5, 295); 72 Landon Peterson – freshman (6'5, 285); 73 Dawson Deaton – sophomore (6'6, 305); 74 Will Farrar – sophomore (6'5, 310); 78 Terence Steele – senior (6'6, 310); 79 Travis Bruffy – senior (6'6, 305); Defensive linemen: 43 Malik Essilfie – senior (6'3, 275); 45 Quinton Williams – freshman (6'5, 230); 53 Eli Howard – junior (6'4, 275); 59 Zackery Semrak – sophomore (6'2, 280); 61 Troy Te'o – sophomore (6'2, 270); 77 Tre'Jon Lewis – freshman (6'4, 240); 89 Houston Miller – junior (6'4, 275); 90 Quentin Yontz – senior (6'2, 275); 91 Nelson Mbanasor – sophomore (6'3, 285); 92 Noah Jones – junior (6'3, 285); 93 John Scott III – (redshirt) freshman (6'3, 275); 94 Lonzell Gilmore – senior (6'3, 260); 95 Jaylon Hutchings – (redshirt) freshman (6'0, 295); 96 Broderick Washington Jr. – senior (6'3, 305); 97 Tony Bradford Jr. – freshman (6'1, 270); 98 Nick McCann – junior (6'2, 310); 99 Gilbert Ibeneme – freshman (6'3, 175)	Linebackers: 1 Jordyn Brooks – senior (6'1, 245); 6 Riko Jeffers – junior (6'2, 240); 18 Christian Taylor – senior (6'2, 235); 20 Kosi Eldridge – sophomore (6'1, 215); 21 Evan Rambo – junior (6'4, 220); 32 Tyrique Matthews – freshman (5'11, 220); 33 Brayden Stringer – junior (6'0, 240); 34 Bryce Robinson – freshman (6'0, 240); 35 Patrick Curley – (redshirt) freshman (6'2, 220); 37 Xavier Benson – (redshirt) freshman (6'3, 220); 39 Michael Nelson – sophomore (5'11, 205); 47 Ethan Frasier – freshman (6'11, 225); 48 Blu Caylor – freshman (6'2, 220); 49 Chance Cover – freshman (6'2, 235); 50 Cole Daggett – freshman (6'0, 220); 51 Wyatt Watson – freshman (6'3, 200); 52 Jackson Baggett – freshman (6'3, 200); Defensive backs: 3 Douglas Coleman III – senior (6'1, 200); 4 Desmon Smith – senior (6'2, 195); 7 Adrian Frye – sophomore (6'1, 195); 8 Zech McPhearson – junior (5'11, 195); 16 Thomas Leggett – junior (6'0, 200); 17 John Davis Jr. – sophomore (6'1, 190); 19 Dequanteous Watts – freshman (6'2, 165); 22 Ja'Marcus Ingram – junior (6'2, 185); 23 DaMarcus Fields – junior (6'0, 200); 24 Adam Beck – sophomore (6'2, 205); 25 Dadrion Taylor – freshman (5'11, 180); 27 Alex Hogan – freshman (5'11, 180); 28 Darien Boyd – freshman (5'11, 190); 29 Devyn Butler – freshman (5'10, 180); 30 Cole Boyd – freshman (6'3, 180); 32 Jake Kirkpatrick – (redshirt) freshman (5'11, 200); 38 Jett Whitfield – freshman (5'11, 205); 41 Luis Jaramillo – freshman (6'0, 175); 46 Seth Ette – sophomore (6'1, 190); Placekickers: 10 Jonathan Garibay – junior (6'0, 215); 36 Trey Wolff – (redshirt) freshman (6'4, 185); 62 Gabriel Lozano – freshman (6'0, 165); Punters: 31 Austin McNamara – freshman (6'4, 175); 48 Cody Waddell – junior (6'1, 205)

== Game summaries ==
=== No. 14 (FCS) Montana State ===
No. 14 (FCS) Montana State Bobcats at Texas Tech Red Raiders – Game summary

Quarter	1	2	3	4	Total
No. 14 (FCS) Bobcats	0	7	0	3	10
Red Raiders	14	14	3	14	45

at Jones AT&T Stadium, Lubbock, Texas

- Date: August 31
- Game time: 3:00 p.m. CDT
- Game weather: Temperature: 93 °F (34 °C) • Weather: sunny • Wind: E 10 MPH
- Game attendance: 54,183
- Referee: Tim Davis
- TV announcers (FSN): Eric Collins and Max Starks

Game information

First quarter

- TTU – McLane Mannix 5-yard pass from Alan Bowman (Trey Wolff kick), 9:26. Red Raiders 7–0. Drive: 11 plays, 85 yards, 3:24.
- TTU – SaRodorick Thompson 1-yard run (Trey Wolff kick), 4:04. Red Raiders 14–0. Drive: 11 plays, 79 yards, 3:09.

Second quarter

- MSU – Coy Steel 31-yard pass from Casey Bauman (Tristan Bailey kick), 9:42. Red Raiders 14–7. Drive: 9 plays, 80 yards, 3:52.
- TTU – Armand Shyne 69-yard run (Trey Wolff kick), 9:13. Red Raiders 21–7. Drive: 2 plays, 75 yards, 0:29.
- TTU – SaRodorick Thompson 3-yard run (Trey Wolff kick), 0:50. Red Raiders 28–7. Drive: 6 plays, 46 yards, 1:27.

Third quarter

- TTU – Trey Wolff 30-yard field goal, 9:56. Red Raiders 31–7. Drive: 13 plays, 62 yards, 5:04.

Fourth quarter

- TTU – Xavier White 45-yard pass from Alan Bowman (Trey Wolff kick), 13:13. Red Raiders 38–7. Drive: 5 plays, 71 yards, 1:01.
- MSU – Tristan Bailey 37-yard field goal, 10:48. Red Raiders 38–10. Drive: 8 plays, 55 yards, 2:25.
- TTU – Alan Bowman 5-yard run (Trey Wolff kick), 5:23. Red Raiders 45–10. Drive: 15 plays, 81 yards, 5:25.

Statistics	MTST	TTU
First downs	8	35
Total yards	289	691
Rushing yards	127	255
Passing yards	162	436
Turnovers	0	1
Time of possession	29:19	30:41

Team	Category	Player	Statistics
Montana State	Passing	Casey Bauman	7/19, 120 yards, TD
Montana State	Rushing	Isaiah Ifanse	15 rushes, 77 yards
Montana State	Receiving	Coy Steel	3 receptions, 56 yards, TD
Texas Tech	Passing	Alan Bowman	40/53, 436 yards, 2 TD
Texas Tech	Rushing	Armand Shyne	11 rushes, 125 yards, TD
Texas Tech	Receiving	Xavier White	5 receptions, 107 yards, TD

The Matt Wells era of Texas Tech football opened up at home against the Montana State Bobcats. The Red Raiders dominated most of the first half, scoring on their first two possessions. The only score in the half for the Bobcats came in the second quarter, with the drive starting with a Xavier White fumble that was recovered by Jahque Alleyne. On the scoring drive, Montana State converted on a 4th and 4 with a fake punt that kept the drive alive. The drive ended with Casey Baunam throwing a 31-yard pass to Coy Steel for a touchdown. White would later redeem himself in the 4th quarter with a 45-yard pass from Alan Bowman for a touchdown. Montana State would not score again until the 4th quarter, with Tristan Bailey making a 37-yard field goal.

=== UTEP ===
UTEP Miners at Texas Tech Red Raiders – Game summary

Quarter	1	2	3	4	Total
Miners	0	0	0	3	3
Red Raiders	7	14	10	7	38

at Jones AT&T Stadium, Lubbock, Texas

- Date: September 7
- Game time: 7:00 p.m. CDT
- Game weather: Temperature: 92 °F (33 °C) • Weather: clear • Wind: S 12 MPH
- Game attendance: 56,957
- Referee: Jon Noli
- TV announcers (FSN): Mark Followill, Brian Baldinger and C.T. Steckel

Game information

First quarter

- TTU – Ta'Zhawn Henry 5-yard run (Trey Wolff kick), 11:14. Red Raiders 7–0. Drive: 9 plays, 50 yards, 2:17.

Second quarter

- TTU – T. J. Vasher 13-yard pass from Alan Bowman (Trey Wolff kick), 10:41. Red Raiders 14–0. Drive: 10 plays, 77 yards, 3:30.
- TTU – Dalton Rigdon 49-yard pass from Alan Bowman (Trey Wolff kick), 1:35. Red Raiders 21–0. Drive: 2 plays, 56 yards, 0:30.

Third quarter

- TTU – Trey Wolff 45-yard field goal, 11:26. Red Raiders 24–0. Drive: 12 plays, 44 yards, 3:34.
- TTU – T. J. Vasher 30-yard pass from Alan Bowman (Trey Wolff kick), 2:45. Red Raiders 31–0. Drive: 6 plays, 60 yards, 1:37.

Fourth quarter

- TTU – Armand Shyne 7-yard run (Trey Wolff kick), 12:51. Red Raiders 38–0. Drive: 6 plays, 59 yards, 2:33.
- UTEP – Gavin Baechle 45-yard field goal, 5:32. Red Raiders 38–3. Drive: 12 plays, 48 yards, 7:19.

Statistics	UTEP	TTU
First downs	11	27
Total yards	131	424
Rushing yards	77	143
Passing yards	54	281
Turnovers	0	1
Time of possession	33:09	26:51

Team	Category	Player	Statistics
UTEP	Passing	Kai Locksley	3/7, 33 yards
UTEP	Rushing	Treyvon Hughes	10 rushes, 27 yards
UTEP	Receiving	Devaughn Cooper	2 receptions, 26 yards
Texas Tech	Passing	Alan Bowman	31/46, 277 yards, 3 TD, INT
Texas Tech	Rushing	Armand Shyne	8 rushes, 45 yards, TD
Texas Tech	Receiving	Dalton Rigdon	5 receptions, 83 yards, TD

The Texas Tech defense held UTEP scoreless for 3 quarters. The Miners' only score of the game came in the 4th quarter with a 45-yard field goal from Gavin Baechle; Baechle had previously missed a 47-yard attempt in the 3rd quarter. UTEP's defense gave up 38 points, but held Texas Tech to under 500 total yards. Alan Bowman left the game in the 4th quarter, finishing 30/45 for 260 yards with 3 touchdowns and an interception along with 7 rushing yards. Jackson Tyner played one drive at quarterback, finishing 0/1 for no yards with 6 rushing yards. On the Red Raiders' next offensive drive, Jett Duffey came in at quarterback, going 1/1 for 4 yards before the game ended. The three Texas Tech quarterbacks finished with a combined 31 completions out of 47 attempts for 264 yards.

=== At Arizona ===
Texas Tech Red Raiders at Arizona Wildcats – Game summary

Quarter	1	2	3	4	Total
Red Raiders	7	0	7	0	14
Wildcats	0	13	0	15	28

at Arizona Stadium, Tucson, Arizona

- Date: September 14
- Game time: 9:30 p.m. CDT / 7:30 p.m. MST
- Game weather: Temperature: 80 °F (27 °C) • Weather: partly cloudy • Wind: ENE 15 MPH
- Game attendance: 37,307
- Referee: Mike Defee
- TV announcers (ESPN): Jason Benetti, Rod Gilmore and Quint Kessenich

Game information

First quarter

- TTU – SaRodorick Thompson 1-yard run (Trey Wolff kick), 0:49. Red Raiders 7–0. Drive: 6 plays, 51 yards, 1:30.

Second quarter

- ARIZ – Stanley Berryhill 12-yard pass from Khalil Tate (Lucas Havrisik kick), 13:37. Tied 7–7. Drive: 7 plays, 75 yards, 2:12.
- ARIZ – Khalil Tate 84-yard run (PAT failed), 8:35. Wildcats 13–7. Drive: 3 plays, 87 yards, 0:57.

Third quarter

- TTU – McLane Mannix 8-yard pass from Alan Bowman (Trey Wolff kick), 6:08. Red Raiders 14–13. Drive: 7 plays, 86 yards, 2:42.

Fourth quarter

- ARIZ – Gary Brightwell 1-yard run (Lucas Havrisik kick), 14:57. Wildcats 20–14. Drive: 14 plays, 75 yards, 6:11.
- ARIZ – Gary Brightwell 1-yard run (Khalil Tate pass to Jamarye Joiner), 4:05. Wildcats 28–14. Drive: 13 plays, 99 yards, 7:10.

Statistics	TTU	ARIZ
First downs	22	23
Total yards	411	499
Rushing yards	104	314
Passing yards	307	185
Turnovers	2	3
Time of possession	25:08	34:52

Team	Category	Player	Statistics
Texas Tech	Passing	Alan Bowman	30/55, 307 yards, TD, 2 INT
Texas Tech	Rushing	Armand Shyne	13 rushes, 68 yards
Texas Tech	Receiving	T. J. Vasher	6 receptions, 96 yards
Arizona	Passing	Khalil Tate	14/23, 185 yards, TD, 2 INT
Arizona	Rushing	Khalil Tate	17 rushes, 129 yards, TD
Arizona	Receiving	Cedric Peterson	1 reception, 47 yards

The Red Raiders traveled to Tucson, Arizona to take on the Arizona Wildcats in their first road game of the season. In a slow 1st quarter, both teams turned the ball over twice. The first score of the game came late in the quarter with a 1-yard run from SaRodorick Thompson to give Texas Tech the lead. Following the touchdown, Arizona's offense started to pick up momentum and reached the Texas Tech 23-yard line before the end of the quarter. The momentum for the Wildcats carried into the 2nd quarter, with Khalil Tate finding Stanley Berryhill for a 12-yard touchdown pass to tie the game 7–7 following Lucas Havrisik's extra point attempt. Arizona would extend its lead two drives later with a 84-yard touchdown run from Tate, but Havrisik missed the extra point. Texas Tech defensive back Desmon Smith was ejected in the 2nd quarter for targeting. Havrisik attempted to further extend the Wildcats' lead with a 51-yard field goal, but the kick failed. The Red Raiders took a one-point lead in the 3rd, but the Wildcats scored 15 unanswered points in the 4th quarter to win 28–14. With the loss, Texas Tech dropped to 2–1 on the season and Matt Wells had his first loss as the Red Raiders' head coach.

On the Monday following the game, it was announced that Alan Bowman suffered a shoulder injury during the game. Matt Wells stated that Bowman would miss several weeks.

=== At No. 6 Oklahoma ===
Texas Tech Red Raiders at No. 6 Oklahoma Sooners – Game summary

Quarter	1	2	3	4	Total
Red Raiders	0	10	6	0	16
No. 6 Sooners	17	17	14	7	55

at Gaylord Family Oklahoma Memorial Stadium, Norman, Oklahoma

- Date: September 28
- Game time: 11:00 a.m. CDT
- Game weather: Temperature: 80 °F (27 °C) • Weather: overcast • Wind: S 10-20 MPH
- Game attendance: 84,416
- Referee: Reggie Smith
- TV announcers (FOX): Gus Johnson (play-by-play), Joel Klatt (analyst), Jenny Taft (sideline)

Game information

First quarter

- OKLA – Trey Sermon 1-yard run (Gabe Brkic kick), 11:27. Sooners 7–0. Drive: 5 plays, 65 yards, 2:37.
- OKLA – Jalen Hurts 1-yard run (Gabe Brkic kick), 5:14. Sooners 14–0. Drive: 8 plays, 95 yards, 5:12.
- OKLA – Gabe Brkic 34-yard field goal, 0:48. Sooners 17–0. Drive: 6 plays, 42 yards, 2:18.

Second quarter

- TTU – Armand Shyne 13-yard run (Trey Wolff kick), 11:44. Sooners 17–7. Drive: 8 plays, 75 yards, 4:04.
- OKLA – CeeDee Lamb 71-yard pass from Jalen Hurts (Gabe Brkic kick), 11:23. Sooners 24–7. Drive: 1 play, 71 yards, 0:21.
- TTU – Trey Wolff 24-yard field goal, 6:33. Sooners 24–10. Drive: 9 plays, 69 yards, 4:50.
- OKLA – CeeDee Lamb 14-yard pass from Jalen Hurts (Gabe Brkic kick), 2:09. Sooners 31–10. Drive: 10 plays, 75 yards, 4:24.
- OKLA – Gabe Brkic 33-yard field goal, 0:00. Sooners 34–10. Drive: 6 plays, 43 yards, 1:01.

Third quarter

- OKLA – CeeDee Lamb 65-yard pass from Jalen Hurts (Gabe Brkic kick), 14:13. Sooners 41–10. Drive: 2 plays, 75 yards, 0:47.
- TTU – Trey Wolff 36-yard field goal, 7:49. Sooners 41–13. Drive: 5 plays, 35 yards, 3:07.
- OKLA – Trey Sermon 32-yard run (Gabe Brkic kick), 5:00. Sooners 48–13. Drive: 8 plays, 75 yards, 2:49.
- TTU – Trey Wolff 41-yard field goal, 0:24. Sooners 48–16. Drive: 10 plays, 53 yards, 4:36.

Fourth quarter

- OKLA – Rhamondre Stevenson 28-yard run (Gabe Brkic kick), 8:18. Sooners 55–16. Drive: 3 plays, 41 yards, 0:54.

Statistics	TTU	OKLA
First downs	16	24
Total yards	314	644
Rushing yards	192	201
Passing yards	122	443
Turnovers	1	1
Time of possession	31:54	28:06

Team	Category	Player	Statistics
Texas Tech	Passing	Jett Duffey	11/20, 120 yards
Texas Tech	Rushing	SaRodorick Thompson	13 rushes, 96 yards
Texas Tech	Receiving	Dalton Rigdon	2 receptions, 37 yards
Oklahoma	Passing	Jalen Hurts	17/24, 415 yards, 3 TD, INT
Oklahoma	Rushing	Trey Sermon	7 rushes, 76 yards, 2 TD
Oklahoma	Receiving	CeeDee Lamb	7 receptions, 185 yards, 3 TD

Jackson Tyner started at quarterback for the Red Raiders, but struggled throughout the 1st quarter. Tyner was pulled late in the quarter and replaced by Jett Duffey; Tyner finished 1/5 for 2 yards.

=== No. 21 Oklahoma State ===
No. 21 Oklahoma State Cowboys at Texas Tech Red Raiders – Game summary

Quarter	1	2	3	4	Total
No. 21 Cowboys	0	7	14	14	35
Red Raiders	13	7	14	11	45

at Jones AT&T Stadium, Lubbock, Texas

- Date: October 5
- Game time: 11:00 a.m.
- Game weather: Temperature: 75 °F (24 °C) • Weather: clear • Wind: WSW 13 MPH
- Game attendance: 56,479
- Referee: Cooper Castleberry
- TV announcers (FS1): Brian Custer and Robert Smith

Game information

First quarter

- TTU – Trey Wolff 38-yard field goal, 12:49. Red Raiders 3–0. Drive: 4 plays, 5 yards, 1:06.
- TTU – Jett Duffey 16-yard run (Trey Wolff kick), 5:01. Red Raiders 10–0. Drive: 6 plays, 83 yards, 1:33.
- TTU – Trey Wolff 27-yard field goal, 1:03. Red Raiders 13–0. Drive: 6 plays, 31 yards, 2:23.

Second quarter

- TTU – KeSean Carter 14-yard pass from Jett Duffey (Trey Wolff kick), 10:21. Red Raiders 20–0. Drive: 2 plays, 37 yards, 0:27.
- OKST – Chuba Hubbard 3-yard run (Matt Ammendola kick), 0:30. Red Raiders 20–7. Drive: 5 plays, 46 yards, 1:25.

Third quarter

- TTU – T. J. Vasher 21-yard pass from Jett Duffey (Trey Wolff kick), 13:02. Red Raiders 27–7. Drive: 7 plays, 75 yards, 1:58.
- OKST – Jordan McCray 73-yard pass from Spencer Sanders (Matt Ammendola kick), 12:00. Red Raiders 27–14. Drive: 3 plays, 75 yards, 1:02.
- TTU – Dalton Rigdon 8-yard pass from Jett Duffey (Trey Wolff kick), 5:48. Red Raiders 34–14. Drive: 6 plays, 59 yards, 2:21.
- OKST – Chuba Hubbard 3-yard run (Matt Ammendola kick), 2:48. Red Raiders 34–21. Drive: 8 plays, 75 yards, 3:00.

Fourth quarter

- TTU – Trey Wolff 26-yard field goal, 13:53. Red Raiders 37–21. Drive: 7 plays, 61 yards, 1:12.
- TTU – Erik Ezukanma 56-yard pass from Jett Duffey (Duffey pass to Vasher), 8:26. Red Raiders 45–21. Drive: 6 plays, 94 yards, 3:24.
- OKST – Chuba Hubbard 7-yard run (Hubbard run), 5:16. Red Raiders 45–29. Drive: 10 plays, 58 yards, 3:10.
- OKST – Tylan Wallace 10-yard pass from Spencer Sanders (run failed), 3:27. Red Raiders 45–35. Drive: 6 plays, 35 yards, 1:49.

Statistics	OKST	TTU
First downs	26	29
Total yards	509	586
Rushing yards	219	162
Passing yards	290	424
Turnovers	5	0
Time of possession	31:56	28:04

Team	Category	Player	Statistics
Oklahoma State	Passing	Spencer Sanders	22/37, 290 yards, 2 TD, 3 INT
Oklahoma State	Rushing	Chuba Hubbard	34 rushes, 156 yards, 3 TD
Oklahoma State	Receiving	Tylan Wallace	11 receptions, 85 yards, TD
Texas Tech	Passing	Jett Duffey	26/44, 424 yards, 4 TD
Texas Tech	Rushing	SaRodorick Thompson	12 rushes, 69 yards
Texas Tech	Receiving	T. J. Vasher	5 receptions, 110 yards, TD

The Red Raiders' defense forced 5 turnovers while the offense committed no turnovers. In his first start of the season, Jett Duffey threw for 424 yards and had 5 total touchdowns in the game. Texas Tech never trailed in the game and defeated Oklahoma State in Lubbock for the first time since 2008. This was the Red Raiders' first home win over a ranked team since September 12, 2013.

=== At No. 22 Baylor ===
Texas Tech Red Raiders at No. 22 Baylor Bears – Game summary

Quarter	1	2	3	4	OT	2OT	Total
Red Raiders	3	3	7	7	7	3	30
No. 22 Bears	0	3	14	3	7	6	33

at McLane Stadium, Waco, Texas

- Date: October 12
- Game time: 3:00 p.m. CDT
- Game weather: Temperature: 64 °F (18 °C) • Weather: fair, humid • Wind: NNE 5-10 MPH
- Game attendance: 47,264
- Referee: Brad Van Vark
- TV announcers (FS1): Justin Kutcher, Shane Vereen and Petros Papadakis

Game information

First quarter

- TTU – Trey Wolff 40-yard field goal, 0:00. Red Raiders 3–0. Drive: 9 plays, 46 yards, 3:55.

Second quarter

- BAY – John Mayers 37-yard field goal, 10:08. Tied 3–3. Drive: 6 plays, 21 yards, 1:44.
- TTU – Trey Wolff 25-yard field goal, 0:09. Red Raiders 6–3. Drive: 7 plays, 33 yards, 2:54.

Third quarter

- BAY – Charlie Brewer 4-yard run (John Mayers kick), 13:03. Bears 10–6. Drive: 5 plays, 36 yards, 1:57.
- TTU – SaRodorick Thompson 4-yard run (Trey Wolff kick), 11:05. Red Raiders 13–10. Drive: 5 plays, 89 yards, 1:58.
- BAY – Charlie Brewer 1-yard run (John Mayers kick), 8:05. Bears 17–13. Drive: 7 plays, 74 yards, 3:00.

Fourth quarter

- TTU – SaRodorick Thompson 30-yard run (Trey Wolff kick), 1:37. Red Raiders 20–17. Drive: 9 plays, 88 yards, 2:42.
- BAY – John Mayers 19-yard field goal, 0:00. Tied 20–20. Drive: 11 plays, 89 yards, 1:37.

First overtime

- BAY – Charlie Brewer 1-yard run (John Mayers kick). Bears 27–20. Drive: 3 plays, 25 yards.
- TTU – T. J. Vasher 2-yard pass from Jett Duffey (Trey Wolff kick). Tied 27–27. Drive: 7 plays, 25 yards.

Second overtime

- TTU – Trey Wolff 35-yard field goal. Red Raiders 30–27. Drive: 4 plays, 8 yards.
- BAY – JaMycal Hasty 5-yard run. Bears 33–30. Drive: 3 plays, 25 yards.

Statistics	TTU	BAY
First downs	26	27
Total yards	510	525
Rushing yards	148	173
Passing yards	362	352
Turnovers	3	3
Time of possession	31:00	29:00

Team	Category	Player	Statistics
Texas Tech	Passing	Jett Duffey	31/42, 362 yards, TD, 2 INT
Texas Tech	Rushing	SaRodorick Thompson	28 rushes, 153 yards, 2 TD
Texas Tech	Receiving	R. J. Turner	7 receptions, 138 yards
Baylor	Passing	Charlie Brewer	24/37, 352 yards, 3 INT
Baylor	Rushing	John Lovett	17 rushes, 77 yards
Baylor	Receiving	R. J. Sneed	6 receptions, 84 yards

Texas Tech played Baylor in Waco, the first time since 2008 that the two did not play one another at AT&T Stadium in Arlington, Texas.

The first half of the game was a defensive battle between the two teams. Texas Tech scored only 6 points in the half with two field goals from Trey Wolff while Baylor only scored 3 with a 37-yard field goal from John Mayers. The Red Raiders had 182 yards of offense in the first half while the Bears had 117. Baylor scored the first touchdown of the game for either team on its first drive of the half with a 4-yard run from Charlie Brewer. After trailing for most of the half, the Red Raiders scored a touchdown with 1:37 left in regulation to take a 20–17 lead. The Bears marched down field with Mayers making a 19-yard field goal as time expired to tie the game. Baylor started overtime on offense with Texas Tech on defense. During the drive, center Jake Fruhmorgen appeared to have fumbled the ball on a snap with the ball being recovered by Jaylon Hutchings for the Red Raiders and the play was blown dead quickly. The fumble was overturned as Baylor was penalized for an illegal snap penalty. The call was heavily criticized and the following day the Big 12 announced that the penalty was the wrong call and that Texas Tech should have gained possession.

=== Iowa State ===
Iowa State Cyclones at Texas Tech Red Raiders – Game summary

Quarter	1	2	3	4	Total
Cyclones	7	13	7	7	34
Red Raiders	0	7	10	7	24

at Jones AT&T Stadium, Lubbock, Texas

- Date: October 19
- Game time: 11:00 a.m. CDT
- Game weather: Temperature: 61 °F (16 °C) • Weather: clear • Wind: N 16 MPH
- Game attendance: 52,315
- Referee: Brandon Cruse
- TV announcers (FS1): Brian Custer and Robert Smith

Game information

First quarter

- ISU – Charlie Kolar 24-yard pass from Brock Purdy (Connor Assalley kick), 4:58. Cyclones 7–0. Drive: 7 plays, 80 yards, 3:55.

Second quarter

- ISU – Charlie Kolar 6-yard pass from Brock Purdy (Connor Assalley kick), 12:25. Cyclones 14–0. Drive: 11 plays, 80 yards, 5:21.
- ISU – La'Michael Pettway 17-yard pass from Brock Purdy (kick failed), 10:12. Cyclones 20–0. Drive: 2 plays, 78 yards, 0:52.
- TTU – SaRodorick Thompson 6-yard run (Trey Wolff kick), 3:35. Cyclones 20–7. Drive: 11 plays, 69 yards, 3:51.

Third quarter

- TTU – Trey Wolff 22-yard field goal, 8:45. Cyclones 20–10. Drive: 15 plays, 90 yards, 6:15.
- ISU – Breece Hall 75-yard run (Connor Assalley kick), 8:32. Cyclones 27–10. Drive: 1 play, 75 yards, 0:13.
- TTU – SaRodorick Thompson 2-yard run (Trey Wolff kick), 0:00. Cyclones 27–17. Drive: 16 plays, 82 yards, 4:47.

Fourth quarter

- ISU – Breece Hall 30-yard run (Connor Assalley kick), 5:54. Cyclones 34–17. Drive: 3 plays, 75 yards, 1:22.
- TTU – T. J. Vasher 2-yard pass from Jett Duffey (Trey Wolff kick), 1:28. Cyclones 34–24. Drive: 13 plays, 73 yards, 4:26.

Statistics	ISU	TTU
First downs	21	25
Total yards	560	407
Rushing yards	182	168
Passing yards	378	239
Turnovers	1	0
Time of possession	27:45	32:15

Team	Category	Player	Statistics
Iowa State	Passing	Brock Purdy	23/32, 378 yards, 3 TD, INT
Iowa State	Rushing	Breece Hall	19 rushes, 183 yards, 2 TD
Iowa State	Receiving	Tarique Milton	4 receptions, 98 yards
Texas Tech	Passing	Jett Duffey	40/52, 239 yards, TD
Texas Tech	Rushing	SaRodorick Thompson	10 rushes, 57 yards, 2 TD
Texas Tech	Receiving	R. J. Turner	11 receptions, 76 yards

=== At Kansas ===
Texas Tech Red Raiders at Kansas Jayhawks – Game summary

Quarter	1	2	3	4	Total
Red Raiders	7	10	10	7	34
Jayhawks	0	14	6	17	37

at David Booth Kansas Memorial Stadium, Lawrence, Kansas

- Date: October 26
- Game time: 6:00 p.m. CDT
- Game weather: Temperature: 59 °F (15 °C) • Weather: clear • Wind: S 4 MPH
- Game attendance: 31,036
- Referee: Mike Defee
- TV announcers (FS1): Dan Hellie and Evan Moore

Game information

First quarter

- TTU – SaRodorick Thompson 1-yard run (Trey Wolff kick), 5:01. Red Raiders 7–0. Drive: 7 plays, 45 yards, 2:20.

Second quarter

- TTU – Trey Wolff 24-yard field goal, 14:56. Red Raiders 10–0. Drive: 14 plays, 74 yards, 4:02.
- TTU – McLane Mannix 9-yard pass from Jett Duffey (Trey Wolff kick), 8:19. Red Raiders 17–0. Drive: 11 plays, 80 yards, 4:20.
- KU – Carter Stanley 1-yard run (Liam Jones kick), 4:41. Red Raiders 17–7. Drive: 7 plays, 78 yards, 3:32.
- KU – Stephon Robinson Jr. 48-yard pass from Carter Stanley (Liam Jones kick), 0:59. Red Raiders 17–14. Drive: 6 plays, 84 yards, 1:20.

Third quarter

- TTU – T. J. Vasher 19-yard pass from Jett Duffey (Trey Wolff kick), 14:00. Red Raiders 24–14. Drive: 4 plays, 70 yards, 1:00.
- TTU – Trey Wolff 27-yard field goal, 5:39. Red Raiders 27–14. Drive: 15 plays, 68 yards, 6:34.
- KU – Stephon Robinson Jr. 65-yard pass from Carter Stanley (kick failed), 3:56. Red Raiders 27–20. Drive: 4 plays, 75 yards, 1:43.

Fourth quarter

- KU – Andrew Parchment 70-yard pass from Carter Stanley (Liam Jone kick), 13:42. Tied 27–27. Drive: 8 plays, 86 yards, 2:17.
- TTU – Dalton Rigdon 48-yard pass from Jett Duffey (Trey Wolff kick), 12:18. Red Raiders 34–27. Drive: 3 plays, 75 yards, 1:24.
- KU – Velton Gardner 32-yard run (Liam Jones kick), 5:12. Tied 34–34. Drive: 10 plays, 70 yards, 3:50.
- KU – Liam Jones 32-yard field goal, 0:00. Jayhawks 37–34. Drive: 1 play, 0 yards, 0:02.

Statistics	TTU	KU
First downs	28	22
Total yards	483	527
Rushing yards	212	112
Passing yards	271	415
Turnovers	1	1
Time of possession	32:28	27:32

Team	Category	Player	Statistics
Texas Tech	Passing	Jett Duffey	23/34, 271 yards, 3 TD
Texas Tech	Rushing	SaRodorick Thompson	20 rushes, 80 yards, TD
Texas Tech	Receiving	Dalton Rigdon	7 receptions, 76 yards, TD
Kansas	Passing	Carter Stanley	26/37, 415 yards, 3 TD, INT
Kansas	Rushing	Pooka Williams Jr.	21 rushes, 69 yards
Kansas	Receiving	Stephon Robinson Jr.	6 receptions, 186 yards, 2 TD

Kansas kicker Liam Jones missed the initial game-winning field goal, with Douglas Coleman III recovering the ball for Texas Tech. Coleman then fumbled the ball, with Kevin Feder recovering it for Kansas at the Texas Tech 14-yard line with 2 seconds left. Jones would make his second attempt, winning the game 37–34 for the Jayhawks. This is the Red Raiders' first loss in Lawrence, first loss to the Jayhawks since October 6, 2001, and second overall loss to the Jayhawks.

Texas Tech's coach Matt Wells praised Jayhawk coach Les Miles after the game: "I think Coach Miles brings credibility to that program. I mean, the job that he obviously did at Oklahoma State and did at LSU speaks for itself. He's had success everywhere he's been. And those kids played hard on Saturday. They really did. They went out and, man, they did. They emptied the tank and had every right to win and deserved to win."

=== At West Virginia ===
Texas Tech Red Raiders at West Virginia Mountaineers – Game summary

Quarter	1	2	3	4	Total
Red Raiders	21	14	0	3	38
Mountaineers	3	7	0	7	17

at Mountaineer Field at Milan Puskar Stadium, Morgantown, WV

- Date: November 9
- Game time: 11:00 a.m. CST / 12:00 p.m. EST
- Game weather: Temperature: 41 °F (5 °C) • Weather: cloudy • Wind: SW 5 MPH
- Game attendance: 56,573
- Referee: Reggie Smith
- TV announcers (ESPN2): Beth Mowins, Anthony Becht and Rocky Boiman

Game information

First quarter

- TTU – Ta'Zhawn Henry 2-yard run (Trey Wolff kick), 10:58. Red Raiders 7–0. Drive: 11 plays, 72 yards, 4:02.
- WVU – Casey Legg 30-yard field goal, 7:43. Red Raiders 7–3. Drive: 8 plays, 63 yards, 3:09.
- TTU – Dalton Rigdon 81-yard pass from Jett Duffey (Trey Wolff kick), 7:27. Red Raiders 14–3. Drive: 1 play, 81 yards, 0:10.
- TTU – Ta'Zhawn Henry 4-yard run (Trey Wolff kick), 4:52. Red Raiders 21–3. Drive: 6 plays, 24 yards, 2:14.

Second quarter

- TTU – SaRodorick Thompson 1-yard run (Trey Wolff kick), 13:25. Red Raiders 28–3. Drive: 9 plays, 87 yards, 2:40.
- WVU – Kennedy McKoy 24-yard pass from Isaiah Esdale (Casey Legg kick), 11:16. Red Raiders 28–10. Drive: 6 plays, 65 yards, 2:09.
- TTU – SaRodorick Thompson 2-yard run (Trey Wolff kick), 8:01. Red Raiders 35–10. Drive: 9 plays, 73 yards, 3:06.

Third quarter

- No scoring plays

Fourth quarter

- TTU – Trey Wolff 24-yard field goal, 10:20. Red Raiders 38–10. Drive: 11 plays, 54 yards, 4:12.
- WVU – Tony Mathis 9-yard pass from Jarret Doege (Casey Legg kick), 0:05. Red Raiders 38–17. Drive: 7 plays, 61 yards, 2:18.

Statistics	TTU	WVU
First downs	22	25
Total yards	481	549
Rushing yards	127	51
Passing yards	354	498
Turnovers	0	4
Time of possession	30:12	29:48

Team	Category	Player	Statistics
Texas Tech	Passing	Jett Duffey	24/34, 354 yards, TD
Texas Tech	Rushing	Ta'Zhawn Henry	22 rushes, 67 yards, 2 TD
Texas Tech	Receiving	Dalton Rigdon	3 receptions, 106 yards, TD
West Virginia	Passing	Austin Kendall	26/43, 355 yards, 2 INT
West Virginia	Rushing	Leddie Brown	6 rushes, 16 yards
West Virginia	Receiving	Sam James	14 receptions, 223 yards

With the victory, the Red Raiders snapped a 5-game losing streak against the Mountaineers.

=== TCU ===
Texas Christian Horned Frogs at Texas Tech Red Raiders – Game summary

Quarter	1	2	3	4	Total
Horned Frogs	17	10	0	6	33
Red Raiders	0	16	12	3	31

at Jones AT&T Stadium, Lubbock, Texas

- Date: November 16
- Game time: 11:00 a.m. CST
- Game weather: Temperature: 52 °F (11 °C) • Weather: Partly cloudy • Wind: SSW 9 MPH
- Game attendance: 50,459
- Referee: Mike Defee
- TV announcers (ESPN2): Dave Neal, D.J. Shockley and Dawn Davenport

Game information

First quarter

- TCU – Max Duggan 20-yard run (Jonathan Song kick), 9:46. Horned Frogs 7–0. Drive: 10 plays, 75 yards, 5:14.
- TCU – Jonathan Song 36-yard field goal, 7:12. Horned Frogs 10–0. Drive: 6 plays, 27 yards, 2:05.
- TCU – Artayvious Lynn 4-yard pass from Max Duggan (Jonathan Song kick), 0:59. Horned Frogs 17–0. Drive: 9 plays, 83 yards, 4:28.

Second quarter

- TTU – Trey Wolff 36-yard field goal, 12:55. Horned Frogs 17–3. Drive: 12 plays, 57 yards, 3:04.
- TCU – Jalen Reagor 55-yard pass from Max Duggan (Jonathan Song kick), 11:42. Horned Frogs 24–3. Drive: 3 plays, 69 yards, 1:13.
- TTU – Dalton Rigdon 26-yard pass from Jett Duffey (Trey Wolff kick), 10:15. Horned Frogs 24–10. Drive: 4 plays, 37 yards, 1:27.
- TTU – R. J. Turner 70-yard pass from Jett Duffey (kick failed), 1:55. Horned Frogs 24–16. Drive: 2 plays, 68 yards, 0:32.
- TCU – Jonathan Song 28-yard field goal, 0:02. Horned Frogs 27–16. Drive: 14 plays, 58 yards, 1:53.

Third quarter

- TTU – R. J. Turner 32-yard pass from Jett Duffey (run failed), 13:19. Horned Frogs 27–22. Drive: 5 plays, 67 yards, 1:41.
- TTU – Erik Ezukanma 33-yard pass from Jett Duffey (pass failed), 5:05. Red Raiders 28–27. Drive: 4 plays, 51 yards, 1:03.

Fourth quarter

- TCU – Jonathan Song 25-yard field goal, 14:56. Horned Frogs 30–28. Drive: 10 plays, 68 yards, 5:09.
- TTU – Trey Wolff 24-yard field goal, 12:21. Red Raiders 31–30. Drive: 8 plays, 69 yards, 2:35.
- TCU – Jonathan Song 20-yard field goal, 5:38. Horned Frogs 33–31. Drive: 13 plays, 69 yards, 6:43.

Statistics	TCU	TTU
First downs	28	16
Total yards	549	402
Rushing yards	226	69
Passing yards	323	333
Turnovers	0	2
Time of possession	43:26	16:34

Team	Category	Player	Statistics
TCU	Passing	Max Duggan	25/42, 323 yards, 2 TD
TCU	Rushing	Darius Anderson	19 rushes, 87 yards
TCU	Receiving	Taye Barber	8 receptions, 137 yards
Texas Tech	Passing	Jett Duffey	19/33, 333 yards, 4 TD, INT
Texas Tech	Rushing	Jett Duffey	9 rushes, 42 yards
Texas Tech	Receiving	R. J Turner	3 receptions, 116 yards, 2 TD

The Red Raiders struggled early in the game, with their first drive ending in a Jett Duffey pass that was intercepted by Hyatt Harris near mid-field. At the end of the 1st quarter, Texas Tech trailed TCU 17–0 then trailed 24–3 during the second. The Red Raiders' would score their first touchdown with a 26-yard pass from Duffey to Dalton Rigdon with 10:15 left in the first half. The team would score another touchdown in the quarter, but Trey Wolff missed the extra point attempt, his only miss of the season. Texas Tech's defense held the Horned Frogs scoreless in the 3rd quarter while the offense scored two touchdowns, but failed the two-point conversion after each one, leading 28–27 at the end of the quarter. Neither team scored a touchdown in the final quarter, with Jonathan Song making two field goals for the Horned Frogs and Trey Wolff making a 24-yard attempt. Texas Tech received the ball back with just under 2:30 left to play, but McClane Mannix fumbled on the first play of the drive with TCU recovering it, running out the clock to win the game 33–31.

=== Kansas State ===
Kansas State Wildcats at Texas Tech Red Raiders – Game summary

Quarter	1	2	3	4	Total
Wildcats	3	3	17	7	30
Red Raiders	0	3	14	10	27

at Jones AT&T Stadium, Lubbock, Texas

- Date: November 23
- Game time: 6:00 p.m. CST
- Game weather: Temperature: 56 °F (13 °C) • Weather: clear • Wind: NW 10 MPH
- Game attendance: 50,117
- Referee: Reggie Smith
- TV announcers (FS1): Aaron Goldsmith and Ben Leber

Game information

First quarter

- KSU – Blake Lynch 32-yard field goal, 1:19. Wildcats 3–0. Drive: 10 plays, 52 yards, 5:48.

Second quarter

- TTU – Trey Wolff 44-yard field goal, 8:40. Tied 3–3. Drive: 9 plays, 51 yards, 3:10.
- KSU – Blake Lynch 32-yard field goal, 4:33. Wildcats 6–3. Drive: 8 plays, 61 yards, 4:07.

Third quarter

- KSU – Phillip Brooks 14-yard pass from Skylar Thompson (Blake Lynch kick), 10:20. Wildcats 13–3. Drive: 9 plays, 75 yards, 4:40.
- TTU – SaRodorick Thompson 5-yard run (Trey Wolff kick), 7:06. Wildcats 13–10. Drive: 12 plays, 75 yards, 3:14.
- KSU – Joshua Youngblood 100-yard kickoff return (Blake Lynch kick), 6:52. Wildcats 20–10.
- TTU – Erik Ezukanma 21-yard pass from Jett Duffey (Trey Wolff kick), 5:31. Wildcats 20–17. Drive: 6 plays, 49 yards, 1:21.
- KSU – Blake Lynch 43-yard field goal, 2:17. Wildcats 23–17. Drive: 9 plays, 50 yards, 3:14.

Fourth quarter

- TTU – Trey Wolff 27-yard field goal, 14:35. Wildcats 23–20. Drive: 11 plays, 66 yards, 2:42.
- KSU – Chabastin Taylor 48-yard pass from Skylar Thompson (Blake Lynch kick), 8:54. Wildcats 30–20. Drive: 2 plays, 85 yards, 0:56.
- TTU – R. J. Turner 58-yard pass from Jett Duffey (Trey Wolff kick), 3:58. Wildcats 30–27. Drive: 4 plays, 60 yards, 1:22.

Statistics	KSU	TTU
First downs	21	26
Total yards	372	512
Rushing yards	126	144
Passing yards	246	368
Turnovers	1	2
Time of possession	32:15	27:45

Team	Category	Player	Statistics
Kansas State	Passing	Skylar Thompson	14/28, 246 yards, 2 TD, INT
Kansas State	Rushing	James Gilbert	12 rushes, 61 yards
Kansas State	Receiving	Chabastin Taylor	3 receptions, 74 yards, TD
Texas Tech	Passing	Jett Duffey	28/49, 334 yards, 2 TD, 2 INT
Texas Tech	Rushing	SaRodorick Thompson	21 rushes, 84 yards, TD
Texas Tech	Receiving	R. J. Turner	7 receptions, 141 yards, TD

Kansas State traveled to Lubbock to play Texas Tech for the 2019 meeting of the two schools. Texas Tech held Kansas State to just six points in the first half, but were unable to continue the success in the second half. Kansas State managed to force several interceptions—something no other team has done for the season.

In the third quarter, Kansas State's Joshua Youngblood returned a kickoff for 100 yards for a touchdown. Youngblood credited key blocks from his teammates.

Texas Tech attempted two fake punts and were successful in one of those, but it did not result in a scoring drive. The successful fake occurred in the fourth quarter with Kansas State ahead by 10. Tech was on its own 42 yard line on fourth down with six to gain. The Tech punter Austin McNamara made good on a pass to Ezukanma for 34 yards, taking it all the way to Kansas State's 10 yard line. The very next play, Texas Tech was intercepted in the end zone by Kansas State's Denzel Goolsby to stop the drive.

The Red Raiders were eliminated from bowl contention with the loss. The final score was close: Texas Tech 27, Kansas State 30.

=== At Texas ===
Texas Tech Red Raiders at Texas Longhorns – Game summary

Quarter	1	2	3	4	Total
Red Raiders	14	7	3	0	24
Longhorns	6	22	14	7	49

at Darrell K Royal–Texas Memorial Stadium, Austin, Texas

- Date: November 29
- Game time: 11:00 a.m. CST
- Game weather: Temperature: 54 °F (12 °C) • Weather: Cloudy, 95% humidity • Wind: Calm
- Game attendance: 93,747
- Referee: C. Castleberry
- TV announcers (Fox): Joe Davis, Brock Huard, and Bruce Feldman

Game information

First quarter

- TTU – KeSean Carter 13-yard pass from Jett Duffey (Trey Wolff kick), 9:10. Red Raiders 7–0. Drive: 11 plays, 80 yards, 2:09.
- TTU – SaRodorick Thompson 10-yard run (Trey Wolff kick), 4:14. Red Raiders 14–0. Drive: 6 plays, 76 yards, 2:39.
- TEX – Sam Ehlinger 10-yard run (kick blocked), 0:54. Red Raiders 14–6. Drive: 6 plays, 75 yards, 3:20.

Second quarter

- TEX – Daniel Young 3-yard run (Ehlinger pass to Duvernay), 13:09. Tied 14–14. Drive: 5 plays, 64 yards, 1:38.
- TTU – Erik Ezukanma 24-yard pass from Jett Duffey (Trey Wolff kick), 8:13. Red Raiders 21–14. Drive: 2 plays, 24 yards, 0:23.
- TEX – Devin Duvernay 75-yard pass from Sam Ehlinger (Cameron Dicker kick), 8:02. Tied 21–21. Drive: 1 play, 75 yards, 0:11.
- TEX – Roschon Johnson 1-yard run (Cameron Dicker kick), 1:22. Longhorns 28–21. Drive: 13 plays, 74 yards, 5:36.

Third quarter

- TEX – Jake Smith 26-yard pass from Sam Ehlinger (Cameron Dicker kick), 8:52. Longhorns 35–21. Drive: 7 plays, 82 yards, 1:56.
- TTU – Trey Wolff 23-yard field goal, 6:09. Longhorns 35–24. Drive: 12 plays, 70 yards, 2:43.
- TEX – Roschon Johnson 1-yard run (Cameron Dicker kick), 2:35. Longhorns 42–24. Drive: 9 plays, 74 yards, 3:34.

Fourth quarter

- TEX – Roschon Johnson 1-yard run (Cameron Dicker kick), 8:50. Longhorns 49–24. Drive: 5 plays, 24 yards, 1:11.

Statistics	TTU	TEX
First downs	26	29
Total yards	470	610
Rushing yards	71	262
Passing yards	399	348
Turnovers	2	0
Time of possession	25:51	34:09

Team	Category	Player	Statistics
Texas Tech	Passing	Jett Duffey	36/58, 399 yards, 2 TD
Texas Tech	Rushing	SaRodorick Thompson	16 rushes, 86 yards, TD
Texas Tech	Receiving	KeSean Carter	11 receptions, 150 yards, TD
Texas	Passing	Sam Ehlinger	19/27, 348 yards, 2 TD
Texas	Rushing	Roschon Johnson	23 rushes, 105 yards, 3 TD
Texas	Receiving	Devin Duvernay	6 receptions, 199 yards, TD

== Statistics ==
=== Scoring ===
Scores against non-conference opponents

	1	2	3	4	Total
Opponents	0	20	0	21	41
Texas Tech	28	28	20	21	97

Scores against the Big 12

	1	2	3	4	OT	2OT	Total
Opponents	36	86	86	69	7	6	290
Texas Tech	58	61	64	46	7	3	239

Scores against all opponents

	1	2	3	4	OT	2OT	Total
Opponents	36	106	86	90	7	6	331
Texas Tech	86	89	84	66	7	3	335

=== Offense ===
Passing statistics
No.	POS	NAME	CMP	ATT	YDS	CMP%	AVG	LNG	TD	INT	RTG	Ref
7	QB	Jett Duffey	239	367	2,840	65.1	7.7	81	18	5	143.6	
10	QB	Alan Bowman	101	154	1,020	65.6	6.6	66	6	3	130.2	
31	P	Austin McNamara	1	1	34	100.0	34.0	34	0	0	385.6	
17	QB	Jackson Tyner	1	8	2	12.5	0.3	2	0	0	14.6	
13	WR	McLane Mannix	0	1	0	0.0	0.0	0	0	0	0.0	
		TOTALS	342	531	3,896	64.4	7.3	81	24	8	137.9	

Rushing statistics
No.	POS	NAME	ATT	YDS	AVG	LNG	TD	Ref
28	RB	SaRodorick Thompson	160	765	4.8	58	12	
5	RB	Armand Shyne	65	374	5.8	69	3	
26	RB	Ta'Zhawn Henry	75	340	4.5	19	3	
7	QB	Jett Duffey	72	212	2.9	19	1	
13	WR	McLane Mannix	3	37	12.3	23	0	
		TOTALS	404	1,795	4.4	69	20	

Receiving statistics
No.	POS	NAME	REC	YDS	AVG	LNG	TD	Ref
9	WR	T.J. Vasher	42	515	12.3	39	6	
		TOTALS	342	3,896	11.4	81	24	

=== Special teams ===
Kicking statistics
No.	NAME	XPM	XPA	XP%	FGM	FGA	PCT	1–19	20–29	30–39	40–49	50+	LNG	PTS	Ref
36	Trey Wolff	40	41	97.5	20	22	90.9	0/0	11/11	5/5	4/6	0/0	45	100	

== Weekly awards ==
- Big 12 Offensive Player of the Week

Jett Duffey (week 6 vs. Oklahoma State)

- Big 12 Defensive Player of the Week

Jordyn Brooks (week 6 vs. Oklahoma State)

- Big 12 Special Teams Player of the Week

Trey Wolff (week 6 vs. Oklahoma State)

- Bronco Nagurski Defensive Player of the Week

Jordyn Brooks (Week 6 vs. Oklahoma State)

- Davey O'Brien Quarterback of the Week

Jett Duffey (week 6 vs. Oklahoma State)

- Maxwell Award Player of the Week

Jett Duffey (week 6 vs. Oklahoma State)

== Players drafted into the NFL ==
Round	Pick	Player	Position	NFL Club
1	27	Jordyn Brooks	LB	Seattle Seahawks
5	170	Broderick Washington Jr.	DT	Baltimore Ravens
