= 2017 UCLA Bruins football team =

American college football season

2017 UCLA Bruins football

Cactus Bowl, L 17–35 vs. Kansas State
- Conference: Pac-12 Conference
- South division
- Record: 6–7 (4–5 Pac-12)
- Head coach: Jim L. Mora (6th season; first 11 games); Jedd Fisch (interim; remainder of season)
- Offensive coordinator: Jedd Fisch (1st season)
- Offensive scheme: Pro spread
- Defensive coordinator: Tom Bradley (3rd season)
- Base defense: 4–3
- Home stadium: Rose Bowl

Uniform
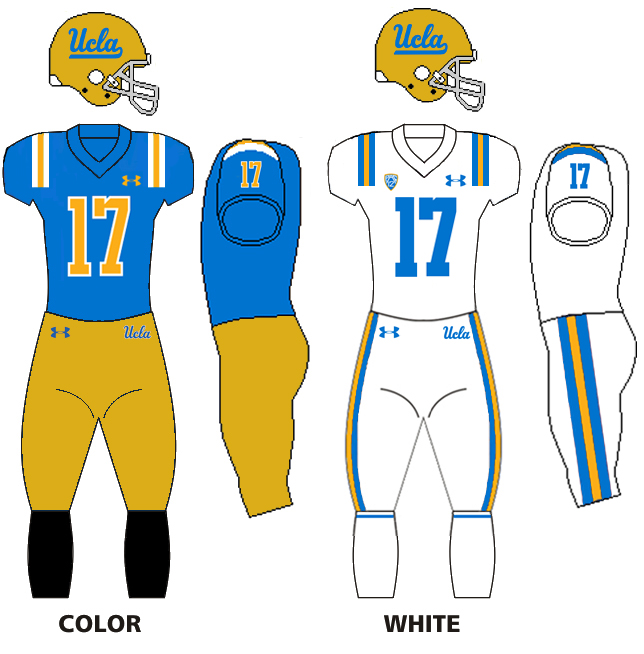

2017 Pac-12 Conference football standings
	Conf.			Overall
Team	W		L	W		L
North Division
No. 20 Stanford xy	7	–	2	9	–	5
No. 16 Washington x	7	–	2	10	–	3
Washington State	6	–	3	9	–	4
Oregon	4	–	5	7	–	6
California	2	–	7	5	–	7
Oregon State	0	–	9	1	–	11
South Division
No. 12 USC xy$	8	–	1	11	–	3
Arizona State	6	–	3	7	–	6
Arizona	5	–	4	7	–	6
UCLA	4	–	5	6	–	7
Utah	3	–	6	7	–	6
Colorado	2	–	7	5	–	7
Championship: USC 31, Stanford 28
$ – Conference champion; x – Division champion/co-champions; y – Championship game participant; Rankings from AP Poll

The 2017 UCLA Bruins football team represented the University of California, Los Angeles during the 2017 NCAA Division I FBS football season. The Bruins played its home games at the Rose Bowl in Pasadena, California. They began the season coached by sixth-year head coach Jim L. Mora. They competed as members of the South Division of the Pac-12 Conference.

On November 19, one day after UCLA lost its third consecutive match-up against its crosstown rival USC, Jim Mora was fired. He finished the season 5–6, with a 3–5 record in Pac-12 play. Following Mora's dismissal, offensive coordinator Jedd Fisch was chosen to serve as interim head coach for the remainder of the season.

The Bruins won all six of their home games and lost all six of their road games during the regular season. In all, they were outscored by their opponents by a combined score of 476 to 422.

== Recruiting ==
=== Position key ===
Back	B	Center	C	Cornerback	CB	Defensive back	DB
Defensive end	DE	Defensive lineman	DL	Defensive tackle	DT	End	E
Fullback	FB	Guard	G	Halfback	HB	Kicker	K
Kickoff returner	KR	Offensive tackle	OT	Offensive lineman	OL	Linebacker	LB
Long snapper	LS	Punter	P	Punt returner	PR	Quarterback	QB
Running back	RB	Safety	S	Tight end	TE	Wide receiver	WR

=== Recruits ===
The Bruins signed a total of 18 recruits.

College recruiting (2017)
Name	Hometown	School	Height	Weight	Commit date
Kanan Ray; OG	Chatsworth, California	Sierra Canyon School	6 ft 4 in (1.93 m)	275 lb (125 kg)	Mar 4, 2016
Kanan Ray; OG	Recruit ratings: Scout: Rivals: 247Sports: ESPN:				
Jaelan Phillips; DE	Redlands, California	Redlands East Valley HS	6 ft 6 in (1.98 m)	250 lb (110 kg)	Apr 14, 2016
Jaelan Phillips; DE	Recruit ratings: Scout: Rivals: 247Sports: ESPN:				
Jaylan Shaw; CB	Corona, California	Centennial HS	5 ft 11 in (1.80 m)	170 lb (77 kg)	Aug 3, 2016
Jaylan Shaw; CB	Recruit ratings: Scout: Rivals: 247Sports: ESPN:				
Jimmy Jaggers; TE	Roseville, California	Roseville HS	6 ft 4 in (1.93 m)	244 lb (111 kg)	Aug 4, 2016
Jimmy Jaggers; TE	Recruit ratings: Scout: Rivals: 247Sports: ESPN:				
Quentin Lake; CB	Santa Ana, California	Mater Dei HS	6 ft 1 in (1.85 m)	180 lb (82 kg)	Aug 16, 2016
Quentin Lake; CB	Recruit ratings: Scout: Rivals: 247Sports: ESPN:				
Austin Burton; QB	Winter Garden, Florida	Winter Garden HS	6 ft 3 in (1.91 m)	203 lb (92 kg)	Aug 22, 2016
Austin Burton; QB	Recruit ratings: Scout: Rivals: 247Sports: ESPN:				
Greg Rogers; DT	Las Vegas, Nevada	Arbor View HS	6 ft 3 in (1.91 m)	305 lb (138 kg)	Nov 21, 2016
Greg Rogers; DT	Recruit ratings: Scout: Rivals: 247Sports: ESPN:				
Rahyme Johnson; LB	Los Angeles, California	Salesian HS	6 ft 4 in (1.93 m)	210 lb (95 kg)	Jan 6, 2017
Rahyme Johnson; LB	Recruit ratings: Scout: Rivals: 247Sports: ESPN:				
Martin Andrus; DT	Los Angeles, California	Los Angeles HS	6 ft 1 in (1.85 m)	280 lb (130 kg)	Jan 6, 2017
Martin Andrus; DT	Recruit ratings: Scout: Rivals: 247Sports: ESPN:				
Darnay Holmes; CB	Calabasas, California	Calabasas HS	5 ft 10 in (1.78 m)	190 lb (86 kg)	Jan 7, 2016
Darnay Holmes; CB	Recruit ratings: Scout: Rivals: 247Sports: ESPN:				
Jax Wacaser; OG	Scottsdale, Arizona	Saguaro HS	6 ft 5 in (1.96 m)	260 lb (120 kg)	Jan 11, 2016
Jax Wacaser; OG	Recruit ratings: Scout: Rivals: 247Sports: ESPN:				
Moses Robinson-Carr; TE	Lancaster, California	Antelope Valley HS	6 ft 5 in (1.96 m)	225 lb (102 kg)	Jan 15, 2016
Moses Robinson-Carr; TE	Recruit ratings: Scout: Rivals: 247Sports: ESPN:				
Odua Isibor; DE	Phoenix, Arizona	St. Mary's HS	6 ft 4 in (1.93 m)	220 lb (100 kg)	Jan 18, 2016
Odua Isibor; DE	Recruit ratings: Scout: Rivals: 247Sports: ESPN:				
Morrell Osling; CB	Lancaster, California	Antelope Valley HS	6 ft 1 in (1.85 m)	170 lb (77 kg)	Jan 18, 2016
Morrell Osling; CB	Recruit ratings: Scout: Rivals: 247Sports: ESPN:				
Zack Sweeney; OG	Fort Lauderdale, Florida	St. Thomas Aquinas HS	6 ft 3 in (1.91 m)	270 lb (120 kg)	Jan 21, 2016
Zack Sweeney; OG	Recruit ratings: Scout: Rivals: 247Sports: ESPN:				
Elijah Gates; CB	Buena Park, California	Buena Park HS	5 ft 10 in (1.78 m)	170 lb (77 kg)	Jan 23, 2016
Elijah Gates; CB	Recruit ratings: Scout: Rivals: 247Sports: ESPN:				
Sean Seawards; OG	Scottsdale, Arizona	Saguaro HS	6 ft 3 in (1.91 m)	315 lb (143 kg)	Jan 31, 2016
Sean Seawards; OG	Recruit ratings: Scout: Rivals: 247Sports: ESPN:				
Stephan Zabie; OT	Austin, Texas	Westlake HS	6 ft 5 in (1.96 m)	290 lb (130 kg)	Feb 1, 2016
Stephan Zabie; OT	Recruit ratings: Scout: Rivals: 247Sports: ESPN:				
Overall recruit ranking:
Note: In many cases, Scout, Rivals, 247Sports, On3, and ESPN may conflict in their listings of height and weight.; In these cases, the average was taken. ESPN grades are on a 100-point scale.; Sources: "UCLA Football Commitments". Rivals.; "2017 UCLA Football Commits". Scout.; "ESPN". ESPN.; "Scout.com Team Recruiting Rankings". Scout.; "2017 Team Ranking". Rivals.com.

== Personnel ==
=== Coaching staff ===
Name	Position	Joined staff
Jim Mora	Head coach	2011
Tom Bradley	Defensive coordinator	2015
Jedd Fisch	Offensive coordinator / quarterbacks	2017
Rip Scherer	Senior associate head coach / tight ends	2015
Jimmie Dougherty	Pass game coordinator / wide receivers	2017
Hank Fraley	Offensive line	2017
Angus McClure	Recruiting coordinator / defensive line	2007
DeShaun Foster	Running backs	2017
Scott White	Special team coach / Linebackers	2015
Demetrice Martin	Assistant head coach – defense / defensive backs	2011
Sal Alosi	Strength and conditioning coordinator	2012

=== Roster ===
2017 UCLA Bruins Roster
Quarterback: 3 Josh Rosen – Junior; 12 Austin Burton – Freshman; 17 Matt Lynch – (redshirt) Freshman; 18 Devon Modster – (redshirt) Freshman; 19 Craig Myers – (redshirt) Junior; 25 Justin Saleh – (redshirt) Freshman; Running back: 1 Soso Jamabo – Junior; 4 Bolu Olorunfunmi – Junior; 20 Brandon Stephens – Sophomore; 23 Nate Starks – Senior; 28 Kahlil Muhammad – (redshirt) Sophomore; 30 Zachary Byrge – (redshirt) Sophomore; 32 Jalen Starks – Sophomore; Fullback: 40 Justin Rittman – (redshirt) Junior; Receiver: 2 Jordan Lasley – (redshirt) Junior; 6 Stephen Johnson III – (redshirt) Sophomore; 7 Darren Andrews – (redshirt) Senior; 9 Dymond Lee – (redshirt) Freshman; 10 Demetric Felton – (redshirt) Freshman; 11 Audie Omotosho – (redshirt) Freshman; 11 Trae Smith – (redshirt) Junior; 14 Theo Howard – Sophomore; 21 Mossi Johnson – Senior; 24 Damian Alloway – (redshirt) Freshman; 26 Alvoid Bennett – (redshirt) Freshman; 27 Xan Cuevas – (redshirt) Junior; 29 Brad Sochowski – (redshirt) Junior; 31 Will McClure – (redshirt) Junior; 39 Ethan Fernea – Sophomore; 82 Eldridge Massington – (redshirt) Senior; 83 Alex Van Dyke – Senior; Tight end: 44 Alex Rassool – (redshirt) Junior; 45 Giovanni Gentosi – (redshirt) Junior; 81 Caleb Wilson – (redshirt) Sophomore; 85 Moses Robinson-Carr – Freshman; 86 Devin Asiasi – Sophomore; 87 Jordan Wilson – (redshirt) Freshman; 88 Austin Roberts – (redshirt) Junior; 89 Jimmy Jaggers – Freshman	Offensive lineman: 51 Markus Boyer – Senior; 52 Scott Quessenberry – (redshirt) Senior; 53 Nolan Dellibovi – (redshirt) Freshman; 53 Jax Wacaser – Freshman; 54 Kanan Ray – Freshman; 55 Michael Alves – (redshirt) Freshman; 56 Josh Wariboko-Alali – (redshirt) Sophomore; 58 Gyo Shojima – (redshirt) Senior; 59 Zack Bateman – (redshirt) Senior; 60 Zack Sweeney – Freshman; 63 Sean Seawards – Freshman; 65 Paco Perez – (redshirt) Freshman; 66 Sunny Odogwu – (redshirt) Senior; 68 Clayton Demski – (redshirt) Freshman; 69 Najee Toran – Senior; 70 Stephan Zabié – Freshman; 71 Poasi Moala – (redshirt) Senior; 73 Jake Burton – (redshirt) Freshman; 74 Alex Akingbulu – (redshirt) Freshman; 75 Andre James – (redshirt) Sophomore; 76 Kenny Lacy – (redshirt) Senior; 77 Kolton Miller – (redshirt) Junior; Defensive lineman: 11 Keisean Lucier-South – (redshirt) Sophomore; 15 Jaelan Phillips – Freshman; 35 Ainuu Taua – (redshirt) Junior; 44 Martin Andrus – Freshman; 56 Greg Rogers – Freshman; 70 Jaypal Bedi – (redshirt) Junior; 75 Boss Tagaloa – Sophomore; 90 Rick Wade – (redshirt) Sophomore; 91 Jacob Tuioti-Mariner – Senior; 92 Osa Odighizuwa – (redshirt) Freshman; 93 Chigozie Nnoruka – (redshirt) Sophomore; 94 Nick Terry – (redshirt) Senior; 95 Marcus Moore – (redshirt) Freshman; 97 Igbinoghodua Isibor – Freshman; 99 Matt Dickerson – Senior	Linebacker: 2 Josh Woods – Junior; 12 Rahyme Johnson – Freshman; 14 Krys Barnes – Sophomore; 20 Leni Toailoa – (redshirt) Freshman; 32 Mique Juarez – (redshirt) Freshman; 40 Josh Chambers – (redshirt) Freshman; 42 Kenny Young – Senior; 46 Donovan Williams – Freshman; 52 Lokeni Toailoa – Sophomore; 55 Breland Brandt – (redshirt) Freshman; Defensive back: 1 Darnay Holmes – Freshman; 3 Brandon Burton – Sophomore; 4 Jaleel Wadood – Senior; 6 Adarius Pickett – (redshirt) Junior; 7 Morrell Osling III – Freshman; 9 Elijah Gates – Freshman; 10 Colin Samuel – (redshirt) Sophomore; 17 DeChaun Holiday – (redshirt) Sophomore; 18 Octavius Spencer – Junior; 22 Nate Meadors – Junior; 23 Will Lockett – (redshirt) Sophomore; 24 Jaylan Shaw – Freshman; 25 Denzel Fisher – (redshirt) Junior; 26 Jason Baker – (redshirt) Sophomore; 27 Tre Polamalu – (redshirt) Freshman; 28 Keyon Riley – (redshirt) Freshman; 37 Quentin Lake – Freshman; 39 Michael Mapes – (redshirt) Freshman; Punter: 20 Stefan Flintoft – (redshirt) Junior; 92 Austin Kent – Sophomore; 99 Crawford Pierson – (redshirt) Freshman; Kicker: 15 Andrew Strauch – (redshirt) Sophomore; 17 JJ Molson – Sophomore; Long snapper: 30 Johnny Den Bleyker – Sophomore; 58 Koby Walsh – Sophomore

== Schedule ==
Date	Time	Opponent	Rank	Site	TV	Result	Attendance
September 3	4:30 p.m.	Texas A&M*		Rose Bowl; Pasadena, CA	FOX	W 45–44	64,635
September 9	2:00 p.m.	Hawaii*		Rose Bowl; Pasadena, CA	P12N	W 56–23	50,444
September 16	9:00 a.m.	at Memphis*	No. 25	Liberty Bowl Stadium; Memphis, TN	ABC	L 45–48	46,291
September 23	7:30 p.m.	at Stanford		Stanford Stadium; Stanford, CA (rivalry)	ESPN	L 34–58	48,042
September 30	7:30 p.m.	Colorado		Rose Bowl; Pasadena, CA	ESPN2	W 27–23	61,338
October 14	6:00 p.m.	at Arizona		Arizona Stadium; Tucson, AZ	P12N	L 30–47	48,380
October 21	1:00 p.m.	Oregon^{†}		Rose Bowl; Pasadena, CA	P12N	W 31–14	55,711
October 28	12:30 p.m.	at No. 12 Washington		Husky Stadium; Seattle, WA	ABC/ESPN2	L 23–44	69,847
November 3	6:30 p.m.	at Utah		Rice-Eccles Stadium; Salt Lake City, UT	FS1	L 17–48	45,902
November 11	6:30 p.m.	Arizona State		Rose Bowl; Pasadena, CA	P12N	W 44–37	53,847
November 18	5:00 p.m.	at No. 12 USC		LA Memorial Coliseum; Los Angeles, CA (Victory Bell)	ABC	L 23–28	82,407
November 24	7:30 p.m.	California		Rose Bowl; Pasadena, CA (rivalry)	FS1	W 30–27	50,287
December 26	6:00 p.m.	vs. Kansas State*		Chase Field; Phoenix, AZ (Cactus Bowl)	ESPN	L 17–35	32,859
*Non-conference game; ^{†}Homecoming; Rankings from AP Poll released prior to the game; All times are in Pacific time

== Game summaries ==
=== Texas A&M ===
Texas A&M Aggies (0–0) at UCLA Bruins (0–0)

Quarter	1	2	3	4	Total
Aggies	17	21	6	0	44
Bruins	3	7	7	28	45

at Rose Bowl • Pasadena, California

- Date: September 3
- Game time: 4:30 p.m. PDT
- Game weather: Partly cloudy • 88 °F (31 °C) • Wind S/SW 8 miles per hour (13 km/h; 7.0 kn)
- Game attendance: 64,635
- Referee: John McDavid
- TV announcers (Fox): Gus Johnson, Joel Klatt, and Jenny Taft
- Scoring Summary (Final)

Game information

Texas A&M

- Nick Starkel
  6/13, 62 Yds
- Trayveon Williams
  22 Rush, 203 Yds, 2 TD
- Christian Kirk
  5 Rec, 60 Yds

UCLA

- Josh Rosen
  35/59, 491 Yds, 4 TD
- Soso Jamabo
  7 Rush, 46 Yds, TD
- Caleb Wilson
  15 Rec, 208 Yds

Josh Rosen completed 35 of 59 passes for 491 yards and four touchdowns to rally UCLA to a 45–44 win over Texas A&M. The Bruins overcame a 34-point deficit, the largest comeback in school history and the second-most ever in the Football Bowl Subdivision (FBS). Michigan State had a 35-point comeback win over Northwestern in 2006.

Scoring summary

Quarter	Time	Drive			Team	Scoring information	Score	
Quarter	Time	Plays	Yards	TOP	Team	Scoring information	TAMU	UCLA
1	11:09	13	53	3:51	UCLA	29-yard field goal by JJ Molson	0	3
1	6:41	12	75	4:28	Texas A&M	Keith Ford 5-yard touchdown run, Daniel LaCamera kick good	7	3
1	5:11	4	2	0:38	Texas A&M	19-yard field goal by Daniel LaCamera	10	3
1	4:04	3	20	0:56	Texas A&M	Trayveon Williams 2-yard touchdown run, Daniel LaCamera kick good	17	3
2	11:38	7	99	3:07	Texas A&M	Keith Ford 2-yard touchdown run, Daniel LaCamera kick good	24	3
2	4:11	11	56	4:07	Texas A&M	Keith Ford 1-yard touchdown run, Daniel LaCamera kick good	31	3
2	3:00	4	67	1:06	UCLA	Jalen Starks 2-yard touchdown run, JJ Molson kick good	31	10
2	2:40	1	61	0:11	Texas A&M	Trayveon Williams 61-yard touchdown run, Daniel LaCamera kick good	38	10
3	9:57	6	23	2:31	Texas A&M	32-yard field goal by Daniel LaCamera	41	10
3	4:08	12	41	4:24	Texas A&M	48-yard field goal by Daniel LaCamera	44	10
3	2:06	8	75	2:02	UCLA	Soso Jamabo 6-yard touchdown run, JJ Molson kick good	44	17
4	13:22	8	85	2:04	UCLA	Darren Andrews 9-yard touchdown reception from Josh Rosen, JJ Molson kick good	44	24
4	8:12	5	96	1:06	UCLA	Darren Andrews 42-yard touchdown reception from Josh Rosen, JJ Molson kick good	44	31
4	3:10	8	74	1:31	UCLA	Theo Howard 16-yard touchdown reception from Josh Rosen, JJ Molson kick good	44	38
4	0:43	10	66	1:56	UCLA	Jordan Lasley 10-yard touchdown reception from Josh Rosen, JJ Molson kick good	44	45
"TOP" = time of possession. For other American football terms, see Glossary of American football.							44	45

=== Hawaii ===
	1	2	3	4	Total
Rainbow Warriors	0	7	7	9	23
Bruins	14	21	14	7	56

Rosen threw a career-high five touchdowns, including three to Darren Andrews, in a 56–23 win over Hawaii. The quarterback completed 22 of 25 passes for 329 yards. It was the 12th 300-yard game of his career, breaking the school record of 11 set previously by Cade McNown. The Bruins raced out to a 14–0 lead after the first quarter and 35–7 at halftime. Theo Howard finished the game with a career-high seven receptions for 110 yards with a touchdown.

=== Memphis ===
	1	2	3	4	Total
No. 25 Bruins	7	17	14	7	45
Tigers	7	20	14	7	48

UCLA rallied from a 10-point deficit in the third quarter before falling 48–45 to Memphis. Rosen finished with 463 yards and four touchdowns, but also threw his first two interceptions of the season. The first was by the Tigers' linebacker Tim Hart, who returned it for a 60-yard touchdown to put Memphis ahead 41–31. UCLA had entered the national rankings that week at No. 25.

=== Stanford ===
	1	2	3	4	Total
Bruins	3	10	14	7	34
Cardinal	6	17	14	21	58

=== Colorado ===
	1	2	3	4	Total
Buffaloes	7	3	10	3	23
Bruins	7	7	7	6	27

=== Arizona ===
	1	2	3	4	Total
Bruins	7	7	16	0	30
Wildcats	17	13	10	7	47

The Bruins surrendered 457 yards rushing to Arizona and were outgained 605–409 in total yards in a 47–30 loss, the first defeat to the Wildcats in UCLA coach Jim Mora's tenure. Rosen was 20-for-34 passing for 219 yards with no touchdowns and a career-high three interceptions. It was his first time in the season he was held under 300 yards, ending a streak of seven games dating back to 2016.

=== Oregon ===
	1	2	3	4	Total
Ducks	0	14	0	0	14
Bruins	14	0	10	7	31

=== Washington ===
	1	2	3	4	Total
Bruins	3	6	0	14	23
Huskies	3	17	17	7	44

=== Utah ===
	1	2	3	4	Total
Bruins	0	10	0	7	17
Utes	7	10	21	10	48

=== Arizona State ===
	1	2	3	4	Total
Sun Devils	14	7	13	3	37
Bruins	7	13	14	10	44

After being out the previous week with a concussion, Rosen returned to the lineup and threw for 381 yards with one touchdown and also scored on a 1-yard run in a 44–37 win over the Arizona State Sun Devils. He connected with Jordan Lasley on a 22-yard score on the first play of the fourth quarter, as the Bruins outscored the Sun Devils 10–3 in the final quarter to pull away. Starting slowly, Rosen was just 10-for-25 at halftime, but was 15-of-20 for 225 yards in the second half.

=== USC ===
	1	2	3	4	Total
Bruins	7	0	7	9	23
Trojans	14	0	7	7	28

In his first matchup against USC quarterback Sam Darnold, Rosen was 32 of 52 passing for 421 yards along with three touchdowns and an interception in a 28–23 loss to the Trojans. The two passers were among the top prospects for the 2018 NFL draft.

With their loss to USC, the Bruins finished the regular season with a winless 0–6 record on the road and extended their overall road losing streak to 10 games. Additionally, this was head coach Jim Mora's final game at UCLA, as he was fired the following morning.

=== California ===
	1	2	3	4	Total
Golden Bears	3	6	8	10	27
Bruins	7	10	7	6	30

In the regular season finale against California, the Bruins won 30–27 to become bowl-eligible. Rosen led the Bruins to a 17–9 lead at the half, but was held out the rest of the game for precautionary reasons after he suffered three sacks, including one late in the second quarter when he was slow to get up after being thrown to the ground. He finished 13-of-18 passing for 202 yards and two touchdowns. UCLA finished undefeated at home for the first time since 2005.

=== Kansas State–Cactus Bowl ===
	1	2	3	4	Total
Wildcats	7	0	14	14	35
Bruins	3	14	0	0	17

Officials: Jer. Magallanes (Referee); Johnnie Forte (Umpire); Matt Fitzgerald(Linesman); Tim Graham (Line Judge); Rob Luklan (Back Judge); Wayne Rundell (Field Judge); George Liotus (Side Judge).

== Rankings ==
Ranking movements Legend: ██ Increase in ranking ██ Decrease in ranking — = Not ranked RV = Received votes
	Week															
Poll	Pre	1	2	3	4	5	6	7	8	9	10	11	12	13	14	Final
AP	RV	RV	25	—	—	—	—	—	—	—	—	—	—	—	—	—
Coaches	RV	RV	RV	—	—	—	—	—	—	—	—	—	—	—	—	—
CFP	Not released										—	—	—	—	—	Not released

== Notes ==
- July 1, 2017 – Apparel agreement with Under Armour begins
- August 1, 2017 – The Wasserman Football Center is dedicated
- August 2, 2017 – Training camp starts at Spaulding Field
- August 5, 2017 – Former player Kenny Easley is inducted into Pro-Football Hall-of-Fame
- November 19, 2017 - Jim Mora is fired; Jedd Fisch is named interim head coach
- November 25, 2017 – Chip Kelly named head football coach
- November 28, 2017 – Kenny Young named Pac-12 Player of Week

== Awards and honors ==
- Sep. 5 – Josh Rosen was named Pac-12 Conference Offensive Player-of-the-week
