= 2019 TCU Horned Frogs football team =

American college football season

2019 TCU Horned Frogs football
- Conference: Big 12 Conference
- Record: 5–7 (3–6 Big 12)
- Head coach: Gary Patterson (19th season)
- Co-offensive coordinators: Sonny Cumbie (6th season); Curtis Luper (3rd season)
- Offensive scheme: Spread
- Defensive coordinator: Chad Glasgow (5th season)
- Base defense: 4–2–5
- Home stadium: Amon G. Carter Stadium

Uniform
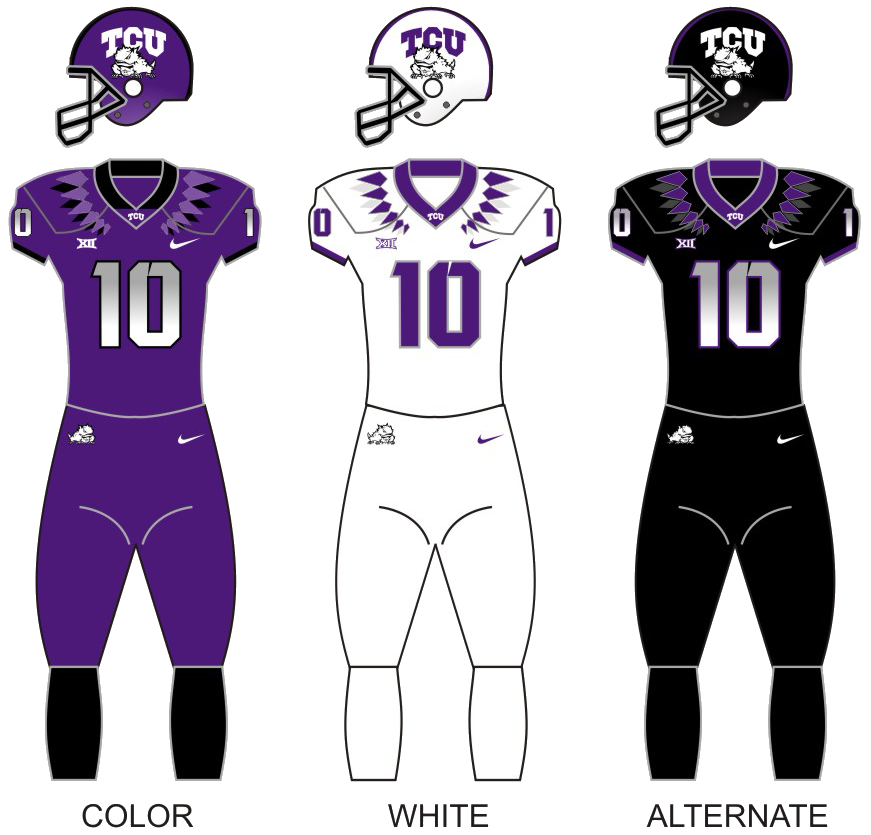

2019 Big 12 Conference football standings
	Conf.			Overall
Team	W		L	W		L
No. 7 Oklahoma y$^	8	–	1	12	–	2
No. 13 Baylor y	8	–	1	11	–	3
No. 25 Texas	5	–	4	8	–	5
Oklahoma State	5	–	4	8	–	5
Kansas State	5	–	4	8	–	5
Iowa State	5	–	4	7	–	6
West Virginia	3	–	6	5	–	7
TCU	3	–	6	5	–	7
Texas Tech	2	–	7	4	–	8
Kansas	1	–	8	3	–	9
Championship: Oklahoma 30, Baylor 23 ^{OT}
^ – College Football Playoff participant; $ – Conference champion; y – Championship game participant; Rankings from AP Poll

The 2019 TCU Horned Frogs football team represented Texas Christian University (TCU) during the 2019 NCAA Division I FBS football season. The Horned Frogs competed as a member of the Big 12 Conference and played their home games at Amon G. Carter Stadium on campus in Fort Worth, Texas. They were led by 19th-year head coach Gary Patterson. They finished the season 5–7, 3–6 in Big 12 play to finish in a tie for seventh place.

== Preseason ==
=== Big 12 media poll ===
The 2019 Big 12 media days were held July 15–16, 2019 in Frisco, Texas. In the Big 12 preseason media poll, TCU was predicted to finish in fourth in the standings.

== Schedule ==
Date	Time	Opponent	Rank	Site	TV	Result	Attendance
August 31	8:00 p.m.	Arkansas–Pine Bluff*		Amon G. Carter Stadium; Fort Worth, TX	FSN	W 39–7	40,422
September 14	6:30 p.m.	at Purdue*		Ross–Ade Stadium; West Lafayette, IN	BTN	W 34–13	60,037
September 21	2:30 p.m.	SMU*	No. 25	Amon G. Carter Stadium; Fort Worth, TX (rivalry)	FS1	L 38–41	41,250
September 28	11:00 a.m.	Kansas		Amon G. Carter Stadium; Fort Worth, TX	FS1	W 51–14	41,960
October 5	1:00 p.m. (Note: Changed from 11:00 a.m. kickoff due to inclement weather.)	Iowa State		Jack Trice Stadium; Ames, IA	ESPN2	L 24–49	59,553
October 19	1:30 p.m.	at Kansas State		Bill Snyder Family Football Stadium; Manhattan, KS	FSN	L 17–24	48,298
October 26	2:30 p.m.	No. 15 Texas^{†}		Amon G. Carter Stadium; Fort Worth, TX (rivalry)	FOX	W 37–27	47,660
November 2	2:30 p.m.	at Oklahoma State		Boone Pickens Stadium; Stillwater, OK	ESPN	L 27–34	52,861
November 9	11:00 a.m.	No. 12 Baylor		Amon G. Carter Stadium; Fort Worth, TX (rivalry)	FS1	L 23–29 ^{3OT}	45,870
November 16	11:00 a.m.	at Texas Tech		Jones AT&T Stadium; Lubbock, TX (rivalry)	ESPN2	W 33–31	50,459
November 23	7:00 p.m.	at No. 9 Oklahoma		Gaylord Family Oklahoma Memorial Stadium; Norman, OK	FOX	L 24–28	82,241
November 29	3:15 p.m.	West Virginia		Amon G. Carter Stadium; Fort Worth, TX	ESPN	L 17–20	40,126
*Non-conference game; ^{†}Homecoming; Rankings from AP Poll and CFP Rankings after November 5 released prior to game; All times are in Central time

== Personnel ==
=== Roster ===
2019 TCU Horned Frogs football team roster
Players
Coaches
Offense

Pos.	#	Name	Class
WR	1	Jalen Reagor	Jr
WR	2	Mikel Barkley	So
RB	3	Emari Demercado	Jr
WR	4	Taye Barber	So
RB	6	Darius Anderson	Sr
WR	7	John Stephens Jr.	So
WR	9	Te'Vailance Hunt	So
WR	11	Dylan Thomas	Jr
WR	12	Derius Davis	So
WR	14	Karson Ringdahl	Sr
QB	15	Max Duggan	Fr
QB	17	Matthew Downing	Fr
QB	18	Matthew Baldwin	Fr
QB	19	Grant Beucler	Fr
RB	21	Daimarqua Foster	Fr
WR	22	Blair Conwright	Fr
RB	24	Darwin Barlow	Fr
WR	31	Michael Byrd Jr.	Jr
RB	33	Sewo Olonilua	Sr
RB	34	Deryl Reynolds	So
WR	36	Ryan Martin	Sr
TE	36	Brent Matiscik	Fr
WR	44	Michael Franklin	Fr
TE	47	Carter Ware	So
OT	51	Quazzel White	So
G	53	John Lanz	Fr
C	55	Kellton Hollins	Jr
OT	56	Austin Myers	Jr
G	60	Nate Guyton	Sr
G	62	David Bolisomi	Sr
C	65	Colson Altman	Jr
G	66	Ian Burnette	Fr
OT	68	Anthony McKinney	Sr
C	69	Coy McMillon	So
G	70	Cordel Iwuagwu	Sr
OT	71	Marcus Williams	Fr
OT	72	Kris Dike	Fr
C	73	Blake Hickey	Sr
OT	74	Andrew Coker	Fr
G	75	Brannon Brown	Fr
OT	77	Lucas Niang	Sr
G	78	Wes Harris	So
C	79	Esteban Avila	Fr
WR	80	Al'Dontre Davis	So
TE	81	Pro Wells	So
WR	82	Jason D'Armore	Jr
WR	83	Cade Rosenkranz	Fr
TE	84	Dominic DiNunzio	Fr
WR	85	Niven Raj	Jr
WR	86	Jack Heathcott	Jr
WR	87	TreVontae Hights	Sr
TE	88	Artayvious Lynn	Jr
WR	89	Jack Powers	Fr
TE	89	Tristan White	Fr

Defense

Pos.	#	Name	Class
CB	1	Tre Tomlinson	Fr
CB	2	Kee'Yon Stewart	Fr
CB	3	Donovann Collins	Fr
S	4	Keenan Reed	Sr
S	6	Innis Gaines	Sr
S	7	Trevon Moehrig	So
S	9	Atanza Vongor	Fr
S	10	Deshawn McCuin	Fr
CB	12	Jeff Gladney	Sr
LB	13	Dee Winters	Fr
LB	14	DeMauryon Holmes	Fr
S	15	Josh Foster	Fr
CB	16	C. J. Caesar II	Fr
LB	18	Ben Wilson	So
LB	19	Dylan Jordan	Fr
CB	20	La'Kendrick Van Zandt	So
CB	21	Noah Daniels	So
S	22	Michael Onyemaobi	So
CB	23	Tony Wallace	Jr
CB	24	Julius Lewis	Sr
LB	25	Wyatt Harris	Fr
CB	26	Vernon Scott	Sr
S	27	Ar'Darius Washington	Fr
S	28	Nook Bradford	Fr
DE	29	Thomas Armstrong	Fr
LB	30	Garret Wallow	Jr
DE	32	Ochaun Mathis	Fr
S	33	Ryan McGee	Sr
LB	34	Zach Marcheselli	Fr
LB	35	Elias Garcia	Jr
S	37	Travis Carpenter	Fr
DE	40	Parker Workman	Jr
DE	41	Brandon Bowen	Jr
DT	42	Earl Barquet	Fr
DT	43	Izaih Filikitonga	Fr
DE	44	Colton Ellison	Fr
DE	46	Connor Koch	So
CB	48	Caleb Biggurs	So
DT	90	Ross Blacklock	Jr
DE	91	Shameik Blackshear	Sr
DT	92	Benedict Brafi	So
DT	93	George Ellis III	So
DT	94	Corey Bethley	Jr
DT	95	Terrell Cooper	So
DE	97	Christian Applewhite	Sr
DT	99	Soni Misi	So

Special teams

Pos.	#	Name	Class
P	31	Jordy Sandy	Fr
K	32	Jonathan Trujillo	Fr
K	37	Cole Bunce	Sr
K	39	Griffin Kell	Fr
K	40	Ray Thomas	Jr
P	41	Dillon Jones	Jr
K	43	Maxwell Finch	Jr
K	46	Jonathan Song	Sr
LS	49	Antonio Ortiz	So
LS	50	Donovan Cahill	Jr
LS	61	Wil Houston	Jr
K	82	Cole Sayre	Fr

Head coach

- Gary Patterson (Head Coach, 18th season)

Coordinators/assistant coaches

- Sonny Cumbie (Co-Offensive Coordinator/QBs, 6th season)
- Chad Glasgow (Defensive Coordinator/LBs, 18th season)
- Jarrett Anderson (Inside Wide receivers Coach, 22nd season)
- Rusty Burns (Offensive Analyst, 11th season)
- Malcolm Kelly (Outside Receivers Coach, 1st season)
- Paul Gonzales (Safeties Coach, 7th season)
- Zarnell Fitch (Defensive Line Coach, 5th season)
- Dan Sharp (Defensive Line Coach, 19th season)
- Jeremy Modkins (Cornerbacks Coach, 8th season)
- Ilaiu Moeakiola (Co-Graduate Assistant–Defense, 3rd season)
- Tony Savino (Co-Offensive Analyst, 4th season)
- Brian Hernandez (Co-Defensive Analyst, 2nd season)
- Darrell Patterson (Co-Defensive Analyst, 2nd season)
- Garrett Altman (Co-Graduate Assistant–Video, 2nd season)
- Kenny Hill (Co-Graduate Assistant–Video, 1st season)
- Michael Smith (Co-Graduate Assistant–Video, 1st season)
- Michael Downing Jr. (Co-Graduate Assistant–Video, 2nd season)
- Demontie Cross (Director of Player Personnel, 2nd season)
- Brett Lemoine (Director of High School Relations, 3rd season)
- Rachel Phillips (Director of Recruiting Relations, 3rd season)
- Matt Lewis (Director–Football Operations, 17th season)
- Don Sommer (Head Strength & Conditioning Coach, 19th season)
- David Gable (Assoc. Director–Sports Medicine, 17th season)

Legend

- (C) Team captain
- (S) Suspended
- (I) Ineligible
- Injured
- Redshirt

Roster
Last update: August 29, 2016

== Game summaries ==
=== Arkansas–Pine Bluff ===
	1	2	3	4	Total
Golden Lions	0	0	7	0	7
Horned Frogs	10	6	13	10	39

=== At Purdue ===
	1	2	3	4	Total
Horned Frogs	10	3	14	7	34
Boilermakers	3	3	0	7	13

=== SMU ===
	1	2	3	4	Total
Mustangs	18	13	0	10	41
No. 25 Horned Frogs	7	10	7	14	38

=== Kansas ===
	1	2	3	4	Total
Jayhawks	0	0	0	14	14
Horned Frogs	21	17	0	13	51

Texas Christian scored 21 points in the first quarter against Kansas and led 38–0 at halftime, with Max Duggan making his second consecutive start at quarterback. However, Alex Delton still was on record as a team captain and he saw play time in the second half. Headed into the fourth quarter with no score, Kansas had only managed 55 yards on 34 plays. Quarterback Carter Stanley finished 12–29 in passing with 84 yards, but the Jayhawks managed to score in the fourth quarter to avoid being shut out. The game ended with TCU scoring 51 to the Jayhawks' 14.

=== At Iowa State ===
	1	2	3	4	Total
Horned Frogs	0	3	7	14	24
Cyclones	7	14	14	14	49

=== At Kansas State ===
	1	2	3	4	Total
Horned Frogs	0	10	7	0	17
Wildcats	7	7	3	7	24

Both Texas Christian and Kansas State entered the game having a week off from the regular season schedule. TCU featured quarterback Alex Delton, a former player for Kansas State who transferred to TCU during the off-season. But when the game time came around, Delton only completed two passes for a total of six yards and the bulk of the passing was completed by freshman Max Duggan, who put up 29 passes with 16 completions for a total of 132 yards passing.

Kansas State gained an early 7–0 lead and never trailed the rest of the way. TCU head coach Gary Patterson said, “I think you have an 80 percent chance of getting beat if you have a punt blocked.” Kansas State did block a punt in this game, as did Iowa State in the previous game for TCU that they also lost. The final score of the game was Kansas State 24, Texas Christian 17.

=== Texas ===
	1	2	3	4	Total
No. 15 Longhorns	3	14	3	7	27
Horned Frogs	3	10	14	10	37

=== At Oklahoma State ===
	1	2	3	4	Total
Horned Frogs	3	14	0	10	27
Cowboys	10	7	7	10	34

=== Baylor ===
	1	2	3	4	OT	2OT	3OT	Total
No. 12 Bears	0	0	3	6	7	7	6	29
Horned Frogs	3	6	0	0	7	7	0	23

Heading into Week 11 of the college football season, rival Baylor was on top of the Big 12 conference standings with an undefeated 8–0 record. Recent victories over West Virginia and Texas Tech were close and TCU was looking to win a few more games to become eligible for a bowl game. Both teams have been able to score and the game was listed as one of the most "compelling matchups" for the week by MSN Sports.

=== At Texas Tech ===
	1	2	3	4	Total
Horned Frogs	17	10	0	6	33
Red Raiders	0	16	12	3	31

=== At Oklahoma ===
	1	2	3	4	Total
Horned Frogs	0	10	7	7	24
No. 9 Sooners	14	7	7	0	28

=== West Virginia ===
	1	2	3	4	Total
Mountaineers	7	3	3	7	20
Horned Frogs	7	3	7	0	17

== Rankings ==
Ranking movements Legend: ██ Increase in ranking ██ Decrease in ranking — = Not ranked RV = Received votes
	Week																
Poll	Pre	1	2	3	4	5	6	7	8	9	10	11	12	13	14	15	Final
AP	RV	RV	RV	25	—	—	—	—	—	—	—	—	—	—	—	—	
Coaches	RV	RV	RV	RV	RV	RV	RV	—	—	—	—	—	—	—	—	—	
CFP	Not released										—	—	—	—	—	—	Not released

== Players drafted into the NFL ==
Round	Pick	Player	Position	NFL Club
1	21	Jalen Reagor	WR	Philadelphia Eagles
1	31	Jeff Gladney	CB	Minnesota Vikings
2	40	Ross Blacklock	DT	Houston Texans
3	96	Lucas Niang	OT	Kansas City Chiefs
7	236	Vernon Scott	S	Green Bay Packers
