= 2017 Cactus Bowl =

- 29th Cactus Bowl
Kansas State Wildcats	UCLA Bruins
(7–5)	(6–6)
Big 12	Pac-12
35	17
Head coach: Bill Snyder	Head coach: Jedd Fisch
	1	2	3	4	Total
Kansas State	7	0	14	14	35
UCLA	3	14	0	0	17
- Date: December 26, 2017
- Season: 2017
- Stadium: Chase Field
- Location: Phoenix, Arizona
- MVP: Alex Delton (QB, Kansas State) & Denzel Goolsby (S, Kansas State)
- Favorite: Kansas State by 6
- Referee: Jerry Magallanes (ACC)
- Attendance: 32,859
- Payout: US$TBD

United States TV coverage
- Network: ESPN/ESPN Radio
- Announcers: TV: Jason Benetti, Jordan Rodgers, Olivia Harlan; Radio: Marc Kestecher, Tom Ramsey, Desmond Purnell

The 2017 Cactus Bowl was a post-season American college football bowl game played on December 26, 2017, at Chase Field in Phoenix, Arizona. The game was the 29th edition of the Cactus Bowl, although only the fourth played under that name.

The game was one of the 2017–18 bowl games concluding the 2017 FBS football season. The bowl featured the Kansas State Wildcats of the Big 12 Conference against the UCLA Bruins of the Pac-12 Conference, and was the final game of the season for both teams. Kansas State won, 35–17.

== Teams ==
Kansas State and UCLA had met three times previously, most recently in the 2015 Alamo Bowl, with UCLA leading the series, 2–1.

=== UCLA Bruins ===
It was announced pregame that UCLA quarterback Josh Rosen had not cleared the concussion protocol and would not play. UCLA named Devon Modster to the starting role in Rosen's absence.

== Game summary ==
=== Scoring summary ===
Scoring summary

Quarter	Time	Drive			Team	Scoring information	Score	
Quarter	Time	Plays	Yards	TOP	Team	Scoring information	KSU	UCLA
1	1:00	12	44	6:11	UCLA	44-yard field goal by JJ Molson	0	3
1	0:00	2	76	1:00	KSU	Alex Delton 68-yard touchdown run, Matthew McCrane kick good	7	3
2	11:34	8	86	3:26	UCLA	Jordan Lasley 52-yard touchdown reception from Devon Modster, JJ Molson kick good	7	10
2	9:25	2	72	0:46	UCLA	Theo Howard 70-yard touchdown reception from Devon Modster, JJ Molson kick good	7	17
3	6:39	8	74	4:40	KSU	Alex Delton 1-yard touchdown run, Matthew McCrane kick good	14	17
3	4:22	4	24	2:01	KSU	Dominique Heath 8-yard touchdown reception from Alex Delton, Matthew McCrane kick good	21	17
4	14:01	4	50	2:08	KSU	Alex Barnes 41-yard touchdown run, Matthew McCrane kick good	28	17
4	4:34	15	98	8:06	KSU	Alex Delton 3-yard touchdown run, Matthew McCrane kick good	35	17
"TOP" = time of possession. For other American football terms, see Glossary of American football.							35	17

=== Statistics ===
	1	2	3	4	Total
Wildcats	7	0	14	14	35
Bruins	3	14	0	0	17

Statistics	KSU	UCLA
First downs	21	14
Plays–yards	66–423	59–364
Rushes–yards	49–344	25–69
Passing yards	79	295
Passing: Comp–Att–Int	10–17–1	21–34–0
Time of possession	35:07	24:43

Team	Category	Player	Statistics
Kansas State	Passing	Alex Delton	7/10, 52 yds, 1 TD
Kansas State	Rushing	Alex Delton	20 car, 158 yds, 3 TD
Kansas State	Receiving	Dominique Heath	5 rec, 49 yds, 1 TD
UCLA	Passing	Devon Modster	21/34, 295 yds, 2 TD
UCLA	Rushing	Bolu Olorunfunmi	12 car, 23 yds
UCLA	Receiving	Jordan Lasley	8 rec, 128 yds, 1 TD
