= Max Duggan =

American football player (born 2001)

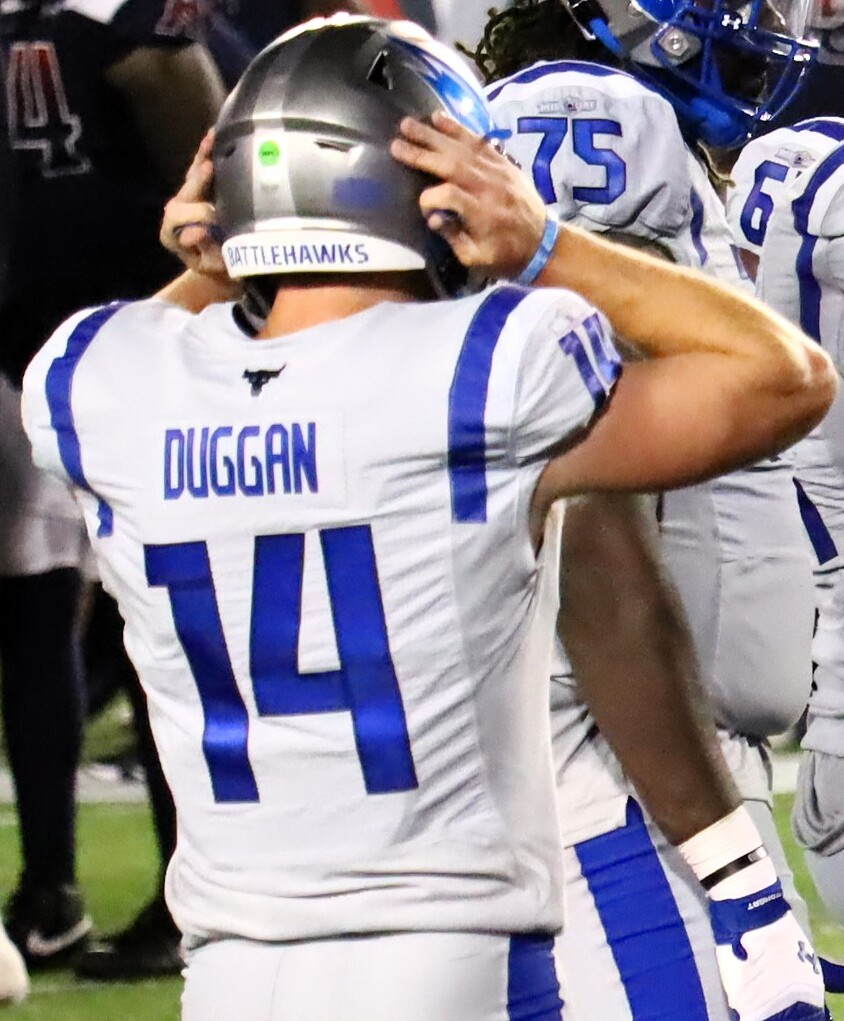
- Duggan with the St. Louis Battlehawks in 2025

Profile
- Position: Quarterback

Personal information
- Born: March 12, 2001 (age 25); Council Bluffs, Iowa, U.S.
- Listed height: 6 ft 1 in (1.85 m)
- Listed weight: 207 lb (94 kg)

Career information
- High school: Lewis Central (Council Bluffs)
- College: TCU (2019–2022)
- NFL draft: 2023: 7th round, 239th overall pick

Career history
- Los Angeles Chargers (2023); St. Louis Battlehawks (2025); Toronto Argonauts (2025); Ottawa Redblacks (2026)

Awards and highlights
- Davey O'Brien Award (2022); Johnny Unitas Golden Arm Award (2022); Earl Campbell Tyler Rose Award (2022); Big 12 Athlete of the Year (2023); Big 12 Offensive Player of the Year (2022); Second-team All-American (2022); First-team All-Big 12 (2022)

Career UFL statistics as of 2025
- Passing attempts: 110
- Passing completions: 63
- Completion percentage: 57.3
- TD–INT: 4–4
- Passing yards: 563
- QB rating: 73.1
- Rushing yards: 300
- Rushing touchdowns: 5
- Stats at Pro Football Reference

Maxwell Duggan (born March 12, 2001) is an American professional football quarterback. He played college football for the TCU Horned Frogs, winning several national awards after being part of the team that made it to the 2023 College Football Playoff National Championship game. He was selected by the Los Angeles Chargers in the seventh round of the 2023 NFL draft.

== Early life ==
Duggan was born on March 12, 2001, in Council Bluffs, Iowa. His two older siblings, Sam and Megan, were both adopted from South Korea.

At Lewis Central High School, Duggan played football, baseball, basketball and ran track. On the football field, he was coached by his father and was a four-year starter at quarterback. As a senior, he passed for 2,130 yards and 24 touchdowns while adding another 1,223 yards and 25 touchdowns on the ground on his way to being named the 2018 Iowa Gatorade High School Player of the Year.

Rated as a 4-star prospect, Duggan was ranked as the top recruit in Iowa for the Class of 2019. Despite scholarship offers from regional programs Nebraska, Iowa and Iowa State, national powers like Georgia, Ohio State and Penn State as well as his favorite team from childhood, Notre Dame, Duggan chose to play his college football at Texas Christian University in Fort Worth, Texas, announcing his commitment to the Horned Frogs via Twitter. He graduated from Lewis Central a semester early in order to enroll at TCU in January 2019.

== College career ==
=== 2019 ===
Duggan's collegiate debut came in the Frogs' 2019 season opener, a 39–7 home victory over the Arkansas-Pine Bluff Golden Lions when he came on in relief of starter Alex Delton late in the first quarter, scoring his first career rushing touchdown on his first possession. His first career touchdown pass came in the second half on a 37-yard strike to Jalen Reagor. He made his first career start three weeks later in a game against the SMU Mustangs, becoming just the second true freshman to start at quarterback under longtime TCU coach Gary Patterson. In late October, he scored the game-winning touchdown on an 11-yard run with less than two minutes remaining as TCU upset the 15th-ranked Texas Longhorns, 37–27. He ended his first season having thrown for a school freshman record 2,077 yards and 15 touchdowns as the Horned Frogs finished with a 5–7 record.

=== 2020 ===
Prior to Duggan's sophomore season in 2020, a medical screening that was part of enhanced safety protocols associated with the COVID-19 pandemic revealed that he had been born with Wolff–Parkinson–White syndrome, a condition that affects the electrical system of the heart. Two days after undergoing a nine-hour surgery to fix the issue, he returned to the hospital with a blood clot and underwent an additional, emergency surgery. Despite these medical ordeals, he was ready to play in the Frogs' 2020 season opener, throwing for 241 yards and three touchdowns against the Iowa State Cyclones. A week later in a road game against the 9th-ranked Texas Longhorns, Duggan once again sealed an upset win over the Longhorns with his legs as he scored from 26 yards out late in the fourth quarter in the 33–31 TCU victory. Beginning with a road win over the Baylor Bears on Halloween, Duggan led the Frogs to wins in five of their last six contests – highlighted by his 369 yards of total offense (265 passing, 104 rushing) in a 29–22 home victory over the 15th-ranked Oklahoma State Cowboys. TCU finished with a 6–4 record and accepted an invitation to play the Arkansas Razorbacks in the Texas Bowl, but the game was canceled as part of the second wave of the pandemic. Duggan ended the 10-game, shortened season with 1,795 yards and 10 touchdowns passing – and with 526 yards on the ground and 10 rushing touchdowns, became the first TCU quarterback to lead the team in rushing since Gil Bartosh in 1950.

=== 2021 ===
Duggan's junior campaign was a frustrating time for the TCU program and him personally. He did throw for a career-best 346 yards and four touchdowns against the 4th-ranked Oklahoma Sooners, but he was hampered by injuries for much of the season as he played through a broken bone and torn tendons in one of his feet. In a late October road loss against the Kansas State Wildcats that dropped the Frogs' record to 3–5, Duggan was benched when his injuries severely limited his productivity. The next day, Patterson's tenure at TCU came to an abrupt halt and interim coach Jerry Kill took over for the remainder of the season. While Duggan was out, backup Chandler Morris threw for 461 yards in leading TCU to a 30–28 upset victory over the 12th-ranked Baylor Bears. After TCU hired Sonny Dykes as their new head coach in November, speculation that Morris' performance against Baylor could signal the end of Duggan's time as the Frogs' starting quarterback increased when Dykes told reporters that there would be open competition for the job going into 2022.

=== 2022 ===
In August, the quarterback competition that lasted throughout the spring and summer ended when Dykes and offensive coordinator Garrett Riley informed Duggan that Morris would be the starter. Rather than entering the transfer portal to find a new program, Duggan elected to remain at TCU and told Dykes that he intended to be the best backup quarterback in the country and that he'd do anything to help Morris succeed. With the Frogs leading 17–6 in the 3rd quarter of the season-opener at the Colorado Buffaloes, Morris injured his knee. Duggan came on in relief, leading the Frogs on two touchdown drives to pull away, 38–13.

After throwing for a career-high 390 yards in a win over the Tarleton State Texans and going on the road to reclaim the Iron Skillet from crosstown rivals, the SMU Mustangs, to finish the non-conference schedule 3–0, Duggan and the Frogs made a statement with a resounding 55–24 victory over the 18th-ranked Oklahoma Sooners. With 302 yards and three touchdowns passing and 116 yards and two touchdowns rushing, Duggan earned Big 12 Offensive Player of the Week honors. In each of the next three weeks, Duggan led the Frogs to come-from-behind victories – first on the road at the 19th-ranked Kansas Jayhawks with a last-minute, game-winning 24-yard touchdown pass to Quentin Johnston and then overcoming double-digit deficits at home against both the 8th-ranked Oklahoma State Cowboys in double overtime and the 17th-ranked Kansas State Wildcats to reach 7–0.

In November, Duggan and TCU defeated their in-state rivals, the Texas Tech Red Raiders, the 18th-ranked Texas Longhorns and the Baylor Bears in consecutive weeks to reach 11–0. In the game against Baylor, the Frogs trailed by eight late in the fourth quarter. After a touchdown to pull within two and a quick stop by the TCU defense to get the ball back with 1:30 on the clock and no timeouts, Duggan led a 54-yard drive to get into field goal range – setting up a dramatic final sequence in which the TCU field goal unit ran onto the field with the clock running before kicker Griffin Kell connected on a game-winning 40-yard field goal that left the McLane Stadium crowd stunned; the TCU fans in attendance cheered in excitement after the field goal was good.

After a home win over the Iowa State Cyclones that made Duggan the first quarterback to lead TCU to a perfect 12–0 regular season since Andy Dalton in 2010, the Frogs were set for a rematch with Kansas State in the 2022 Big 12 Championship Game. Down by 11 in the 4th quarter, Duggan led TCU on yet another comeback, scoring on an 8-yard touchdown run with 1:51 remaining to put him over 100 rushing yards for the game and connected with tight end Jared Wiley on the 2-point conversion to force overtime. The Wildcats prevailed in OT – but the next day, 12–1 TCU became the first team from the state of Texas to be selected to play in the College Football Playoff.

Duggan's accolades for the season include becoming the first Horned Frog to be named Big 12 Offensive Player of the Year since Trevone Boykin in 2014 and the first TCU player to win the Davey O'Brien Award (named after former TCU quarterback Davey O'Brien) and the Johnny Unitas Golden Arm Award. On December 6, he became the first TCU player since LaDainian Tomlinson in 2000 to be named a finalist for the Heisman Trophy. He would finish second in the Heisman voting, behind Caleb Williams from the USC Trojans.

On December 18, 2022, Duggan announced he would forego his remaining college eligibility and declare for the 2023 NFL draft, though he stated that he would still start for the Horned Frogs in the College Football Playoff.

In the College Football Playoff, they beat the heavy favorites Michigan Wolverines 51–45 in the Fiesta Bowl. He went 14 of 29, threw for 225 yards, and 2 touchdowns and two interceptions. TCU lost to the Georgia Bulldogs in the 2023 College Football Playoff National Championship 65–7. Duggan passed for 152 yards, throwing no touchdowns, 2 interceptions and rushing for the only TCU touchdown.

After the end of the 2022–23 school year, Duggan was named the men's recipient of two Big 12 all-sports awards. First, on July 12, 2023, he and Iowa State women's basketball star Ashley Joens were announced as the inaugural recipients of the Bob Bowlsby Award, honoring on- and off-field leadership and excellence and described by the Big 12 as "the Conference's most prestigious individual accolade". Then, on July 31, Duggan and Texas women's track star Julien Alfred were named as Big 12 Athletes of the Year across all sports.

== Professional career ==
Pre-draft measurables
Height	Weight	Arm length	Hand span	Wingspan	40-yard dash	10-yard split	20-yard split	20-yard shuttle	Three-cone drill	Vertical jump	Broad jump
6 ft 1 1/2 in (1.87 m)	207 lb (94 kg)	30 3/8 in (0.77 m)	9 7/8 in (0.25 m)	6 ft 1 3/8 in (1.86 m)	4.52 s	1.55 s	2.64 s	4.45 s	7.26 s	30.5 in (0.77 m)	9 ft 8 in (2.95 m)
All values from NFL Combine

=== Los Angeles Chargers ===
Duggan was selected by the Los Angeles Chargers in the seventh round with the 239th overall pick in the 2023 NFL draft. He was waived on August 29, 2023, and re-signed to the practice squad. On December 12, Duggan was signed to the active roster following a season-ending injury to starter Justin Herbert. He was waived on December 18, and re-signed to the practice squad. On December 22, Duggan was signed to the active roster. On December 25, Duggan was waived and re-signed to the practice squad two days later. He signed a reserve/future contract on January 11, 2024. On August 19, he was released by the Chargers.

=== St. Louis Battlehawks ===
On December 19, 2024, Duggan signed with the St. Louis Battlehawks of the United Football League (UFL). Battlehawks coach Anthony Becht had sought a quarterback with NFL practice squad experience after deciding not to retain the rights to incumbent A. J. McCarron. Duggan began the 2025 season as the second-string quarterback behind Manny Wilkins until ascending to the starting position when Wilkins suffered a season-ending injury during Week 4.

Duggan started five regular season games for the Battlehawks (the lone exception being week 10 where Duggan was rested and backup Brandon Silvers started the game), as well as the 2025 XFL Conference Championship. He was pulled from play during the conference championship for ineffectiveness, only to return when Silvers was injured. Duggan was released on August 15, 2025.

=== Toronto Argonauts ===
On August 27, 2025, Duggan was signed to the practice roster of the Toronto Argonauts of the Canadian Football League (CFL). He was promoted to the active roster on September 18, moved back to the practice roster on September 24, and promoted back to the active roster on October 9. Duggan dressed in three games overall during the 2025 CFL season, completing 13 of 17 passes (76.5%) for 109 yards and one touchdown while also rushing six times for 46 yards.

On May 9, 2026, Duggan was released by the Argonauts.

=== Ottawa Redblacks ===
On May 11, 2026, Duggan signed with the Ottawa Redblacks of the CFL. He was released by the Redblacks on June 22.

== Career statistics ==
=== Professional ===
Year	League	Team	Games			Passing									Rushing				
Year	League	Team	GP	GS	Record	Cmp	Att	Pct	Yds	Y/A	Lng	TD	Int	Rtg	Att	Yds	Avg	Lng	TD
2025	UFL	STL	8	5	5–0	63	110	57.3	696	6.3	67	4	4	73.1	59	300	5.1	37	5
2025	CFL	TOR	3	0	0–0	13	17	76.5	109	6.4	35	1	0	112.1	6	46	7.7	30	0
2026	CFL	OTT	2	0	0–0	0	2	0.0	0	0.0	0	0	0	39.6	2	-1	-0.5	2	0

=== College ===
Season	Team	Games			Passing								Rushing			
Season	Team	GP	GS	Record	Cmp	Att	Pct	Yds	Avg	TD	Int	Rtg	Att	Yds	Avg	TD
2019	TCU	12	10	3–7	181	339	53.4	2,077	6.1	15	10	113.6	130	555	4.3	6
2020	TCU	10	9	6–3	146	240	60.8	1,795	7.5	10	4	134.1	116	526	4.5	10
2021	TCU	10	10	4–6	145	227	63.9	2,048	9.0	16	6	157.6	105	352	3.4	3
2022	TCU	15	14	12–2	267	419	63.7	3,698	8.8	32	8	159.2	137	423	3.1	9
Career		47	43	25–18	739	1,225	60.3	9,618	7.9	73	28	141.4	488	1,856	3.8	28
