= Alex Delton =

American football player (born 1996)

No. 16
- Position: Quarterback

Personal information
- Born: October 23, 1996 (age 30); Hays, Kansas, U.S.
- Listed height: 6 ft 0 in (1.83 m)
- Listed weight: 200 lb (91 kg)

Career information
- High school: Hays High School (Hays, KS)
- College: Kansas State (2015–2018); TCU (2019)

Awards and highlights
- Cactus Bowl MVP (2017); 2x 1st Team Academic-Big 12 (2017, 2018)
- Stats at ESPN

Alex Christian Delton (born October 23, 1996) is an American former college football quarterback who played for the TCU Horned Frogs.

== Early life ==
Delton was born October 23, 1996, in Hays, Kansas, where he grew up to become a football and track & field star at Hays High School. Playing quarterback for the Indians, Delton amassed over 6,700 total yards and 75 touchdowns in his high school career. He committed to play college football at Kansas State in February 2014.

== College career ==
=== Kansas State ===
==== 2015–2018 ====
After enrolling at Kansas State in 2015, Delton played in the Wildcats' first two games that fall before being injured and taking a redshirt season. He returned to action as a backup in 2016, and as a redshirt sophomore in 2017 earned the first four starts of his college career. He came off the bench in the 2017 Cactus Bowl against UCLA, earning game MVP honors by rushing for 158 yards and three touchdowns en route to a 35–17 victory. He was named a team captain for his junior season in 2018, but made just two starts as the Wildcats failed to make a bowl game.

=== TCU ===
==== 2019 ====
After initially deciding to transfer to join former Kansas State offensive coordinator Dana Dimel at UTEP, Delton changed his mind in January 2019 - instead enrolling at TCU, where he'll be eligible to play immediately as a graduate transfer. Delton was named starting quarterback for the 2019 TCU Horned Frogs.
