= 2017 Iowa State Cyclones football team =

American college football season

2017 Iowa State Cyclones football

Liberty Bowl champion

Liberty Bowl, W 21–20 vs. Memphis
- Conference: Big 12 Conference
- Record: 8–5 (5–4 Big 12)
- Head coach: Matt Campbell (2nd season)
- Offensive coordinator: Tom Manning (2nd season)
- Offensive scheme: Pro spread
- Defensive coordinator: Jon Heacock (2nd season)
- Base defense: 3–3–5
- Home stadium: Jack Trice Stadium

2017 Big 12 Conference football standings
	Conf.			Overall
Team	W		L	W		L
No. 3 Oklahoma y$^	8	–	1	12	–	2
No. 9 TCU y	7	–	2	11	–	3
No. 14 Oklahoma State	6	–	3	10	–	3
Texas	5	–	4	7	–	6
West Virginia	5	–	4	7	–	6
Kansas State	5	–	4	8	–	5
Iowa State	5	–	4	8	–	5
Texas Tech	3	–	6	6	–	7
Baylor	1	–	8	1	–	11
Kansas	0	–	9	1	–	11
Championship: Oklahoma 41, TCU 17
^ – College Football Playoff participant; $ – Conference champion; y – Championship game participant; Rankings from AP Poll

The 2017 Iowa State Cyclones football team represented Iowa State University as a member of Big 12 Conference during the 2017 NCAA Division I FBS football season. Led by second-year head coach Matt Campbell, the Cyclones compiled an overall record of 8–5 with a mark of 5–4 in conference play, placing in a four-way tie for fourth in the Big 12. Iowa State was invited to the Liberty Bowl, where the Cyclones defeated Memphis. The team played home games at Jack Trice Stadium in Ames, Iowa.

== Schedule ==
Iowa State announced their 2017 football schedule on December 13, 2016. The 2017 schedule comprised six home and six away games in the regular season. Originally, Iowa State was scheduled to play Akron on September 23, but that game was moved up to September 16. They also scheduled to open Big 12 play against Texas on September 30, but that game was moved up to September 28.

Date	Time	Opponent	Rank	Site	TV	Result	Attendance
September 2	6:00 p.m.	No. 18 (FCS) Northern Iowa*		Jack Trice Stadium; Ames, IA	Cyclones.tv	W 42–24	61,500
September 9	11:00 a.m.	Iowa*		Jack Trice Stadium; Ames, IA (rivalry)	ESPN2	L 41–44 ^{OT}	61,500
September 16	11:00 a.m.	at Akron*		InfoCision Stadium–Summa Field; Akron, OH	CBSSN	W 41–14	22,811
September 28	7:00 p.m.	Texas		Jack Trice Stadium; Ames, IA	ESPN	L 7–17	51,234
October 7	11:00 a.m.	at No. 3 Oklahoma		Gaylord Family Oklahoma Memorial Stadium; Norman, OK	FOX	W 38–31	86,019
October 14	11:00 a.m.	Kansas		Jack Trice Stadium; Ames, IA	FSN	W 45–0	55,593
October 21	11:00 a.m.	at Texas Tech		Jones AT&T Stadium; Lubbock, TX	FS1	W 31–13	57,045
October 28	2:30 p.m.	No. 4 TCU^{†}	No. 25	Jack Trice Stadium; Ames, IA	ABC, ESPN2	W 14–7	56,259
November 4	2:30 p.m.	at West Virginia	No. 15	Milan Puskar Stadium; Morgantown, WV	ESPN2	L 16–20	55,831
November 11	11:00 a.m.	No. 15 Oklahoma State	No. 21	Jack Trice Stadium; Ames, IA	ABC, ESPN2	L 42–49	61,500
November 18	1:30 p.m.	at Baylor		McLane Stadium; Waco, TX	FSN	W 23–13	40,653
November 25	2:30 p.m.	at Kansas State		Bill Snyder Family Football Stadium; Manhattan, KS (rivalry)	ESPN2	L 19–20	49,554
December 30	11:30 a.m.	at No. 20 Memphis		Liberty Bowl Memorial Stadium; Memphis, TN (Liberty Bowl)	ABC	W 21–20	57,266
*Non-conference game; ^{†}Homecoming; Rankings from AP Poll and CFP Rankings after October 31 released prior to game; All times are in Central time

== Rankings ==
Ranking movements Legend: ██ Increase in ranking ██ Decrease in ranking — = Not ranked RV = Received votes
	Week															
Poll	Pre	1	2	3	4	5	6	7	8	9	10	11	12	13	14	Final
AP	—	—	—	—	—	—	RV	RV	25	14	24	RV	RV	RV	—	RV
Coaches	—	—	—	—	—	—	RV	RV	RV	16	23	RV	RV	—	—	RV
CFP	Not released									15	21	—	—	—	—	Not released

== Game summaries ==
=== Game 1: vs. Northern Iowa Panthers ===
Game One: Northern Iowa Panthers at Iowa State Cyclones – Game summary

Quarter	1	2	3	4	Total
#18 (FCS) Panthers	7	3	7	7	24
Cyclones	14	7	14	7	42

at Jack Trice Stadium, Ames, IA

- Date: September 2
- Game time: 7:00 p.m. CDT
- Game weather: Temperature: 78 °F (26 °C) • Wind: NW 5–10 mph (8.0–16.1 km/h) • Weather: Clear and Hazy
- Game attendance: 61,500
- Referee: Referee: Cal McNeill • Umpire: Robert Richeson • Linesman: Al Green • Line judge: Derek Anderson • Back judge: Andy Lebo • Field judge: Joe Bluebaugh • Side judge: Lo VanPham

Game information

First quarter

- 11:02 UNI - Weston, I. 18 yd TD PASS from Dunne, E. (KICK by Drysdale, S.), 8-75 3:58
- 08:04 ISU - Harvey, Willie 12 yd TD INT (KICK by Owens, Garrett)
- 01:08 ISU - Cotton-Moya, K. 22 yd TD INT (KICK by Owens, Garrett)

Second quarter

- 05:31 UNI - Drysdale, S. 43 yd FG 9-64 4:32
- 02:27 ISU - Montgomery, Da. 8 yd TD RUSH (KICK by Owens, Garrett), 8-75 3:04

Third quarter

- 11:21 ISU - Montgomery, Da. 3 yd TD RUSH (KICK by Owens, Garrett), 9-65 3:32
- 07:20 ISU - Murdock, M. 9 yd TD PASS from Park, Jacob (KICK by Owens, Garrett), 9-52 2
- 01:36 UNI - James, J. 18 yd TD PASS from Dunne, E. (KICK by Drysdale, S.), 10-75 5:37

Fourth quarter

- 08:00 ISU - Butler, Hakeem 9 yd TD PASS from Park, Jacob (KICK by Owens, Garrett), 18-77 8:30
- 03:23 UNI - Graham, A. 16 yd TD PASS from Dunne, E. (KICK by Drysdale, S.), 3-54 1:11

Top passers

- UNI – Dunne, E.
- ISU – Jacob Park

Top rushers

- UNI – Allen, T.
- ISU – David Montgomery

Top receivers

- UNI – Weston, I.
- ISU – Allen Lazard

Top tacklers

- UNI – Farley, J.
- ISU – Brian Peavy

=== Game 2: vs. Iowa Hawkeyes ===
Game Two: Iowa Hawkeyes at Iowa State Cyclones – Game summary

Quarter	1	2	3	4	OT	Total
Hawkeyes	7	7	7	17	6	44
Cyclones	7	3	14	14	3	41

at Jack Trice Stadium, Ames, IA

- Date: September 9
- Game time: 11:00 a.m. CDT
- Game weather: Temperature: 65 °F (18 °C) • Wind: SE 5–10 mph (8.0–16.1 km/h) • Weather: mostly clear
- Game attendance: 61500
- Referee: Referee: Ron Snodgrass • Umpire: James Shaw • Linesman: Ric Hinkamper • Line judge: Jeff Szink • Back judge: Dennis Morris • Field judge: Jeffrey Noggle • Side judge: Frank Steratore

Game information

First quarter

- 09:03 ISU - Lazard, Allen 5 yd TD PASS from Park, Jacob (KICK by Owens, Garrett), 4-60 1:50
- 04:23 IOWA - Easley, Nick 10 yd TD PASS from Stanley, Nate (KICK by Recinos, Miguel), 10-76 4:34

Second quarter

- 11:05 ISU - Owens, Garrett 24 yd FG 14-80 4:52
- 00:52 IOWA - Vandeberg, Matt 17 yd TD PASS from Stanley, Nate (KICK by Recinos, Miguel), 10-91 5:04

Third quarter

- 07:21 IOWA - Wadley, Akrum 1 yd TD RUSH (KICK by Recinos, Miguel), 11-94 5:05
- 04:37 ISU - Lazard, Allen 3 yd TD PASS from Park, Jacob (KICK by Owens, Garrett), 10-75 2:44
- 00:52 ISU - Butler, Hakeem 30 yd TD PASS from Park, Jacob (KICK by Owens, Garrett), 6-58 1:38

Fourth quarter

- 11:46 ISU - Montgomery, Da. 7 yd TD RUSH (KICK by Owens, Garrett), 8-65 3:08
- 06:25 IOWA - Smith-Marsette, 15 yd TD PASS from Stanley, Nate (KICK by Recinos, Miguel), 11-92 5:15
- 05:16 IOWA - Recinos, Miguel 23 yd FG 4-0 0:53
- 04:36 ISU - Butler, Hakeem 74 yd TD PASS from Park, Jacob (KICK by Owens, Garrett), 2-83 0:35
- 01:09 IOWA - Wadley, Akrum 46 yd TD PASS from Stanley, Nate (KICK by Recinos, Miguel), 7-89 1:52

Overtime

- 15:00 ISU - Owens, Garrett 30 yd FG 6-12 0:00
- 15:00 IOWA - Smith-Marsette, 5 yd TD PASS from Stanley, Nate 5-25 0:00

Top passers

- IOWA – Stanley, Nate
- ISU – Park, Jacob

Top rushers

- IOWA – Wadley, Akrum
- ISU – Montgomery, David

Top receivers

- IOWA – Easley, Nick
- ISU – Lazard, Allen

Top tacklers

- IOWA – Hesse, Parker, Jewell, Josey
- ISU – Spears, Marcel

=== Game 3: at Akron Zips ===
Game Three: Iowa State Cyclones at Akron Zips;– Game summary

Quarter	1	2	3	4	Total
Cyclones	14	6	14	7	41
Zips	0	14	0	0	14

at InfoCision Stadium–Summa Field, Akron, OH

- Date: September 16
- Game time: 11:00 a.m. CDT
- Game weather: Temperature: 80 °F (27 °C) • Wind: 0 • Weather: Sunny and Warm
- Game attendance: 22,811
- Referee: Referee: Brandon Cruse • Umpire: Rick Podraza • Linesman: B. Edwards • Line judge: Quentin Givens • Back judge: Daniel Young • Field judge: Glenn Crowther • Side judge: Tuta Salaam

Game information

First quarter

- 4:33 ISU Allen Lazard 7 yard pass from Jacob Park (Garrett Owens kick)
- 0:35 ISU Mike Warren 1 yard run (Garrett Owens kick)

Second quarter

- 7:13 AKR Kwadarrius Smith 45 yard pass from Thomas Woodson (Tom O'Leary kick)
- 4:57 ISU Garrett Owens 40 yard field goal
- 3:23 ISU Garrett Owens 40 yard field goal
- 0:38 AKR Warren Ball 11 yard pass from Thomas Woodson (Tom O'Leary kick)

Third quarter

- 3:34 ISU Marchie Murdock 43 yard pass from Jacob Park (Garrett Owens kick)
- 1:34 ISU David Montgomery 9 yard run (Garrett Owens kick)

Fourth quarter

- 5:12 ISU Jacob Park 14 yard run (Garrett Owens kick)

Top passers

- AK – Thomas Woodson
- ISU – Jacob Park

Top rushers

- AK – Warren Ball
- ISU – Montgomery, David

Top receivers

- AK – Tra'Von Chapman
- ISU – Trever Ryen

Top tacklers

- AK – Ulysees Gilbert III
- ISU – Joel Lanning

=== Game 4: vs. Texas Longhorns ===
Game Four: Texas Longhorns at Iowa State Cyclones;– Game summary

Quarter	1	2	3	4	Total
Longhorns	7	7	0	3	17
Cyclones	0	0	7	0	7

at Jack Trice Stadium, Ames, IA

- Date: September 28
- Game time: 7:00 p.m. CDT
- Game weather: Temperature: 72 °F (22 °C) • Wind: W 0–5 mph (0.0–8.0 km/h) • Weather: Clear skies
- Game attendance: 51,234
- Referee: Referee: Scott Campbell • Umpire: Joel Bellinger • Linesman: Doug Moore • Line judge: Keith Garmond • Back judge: Joel Wetzel • Field judge: Randy Smith • Side judge: Corey Luxner

Game information

First quarter

- 07:07 UT - Warren III, C. 11 yd TD RUSH (KICK by Rowland, Joshua), 12-81 6:27

Second quarter

- 05:29 UT - Carter, Toneil 22 yd TD PASS from Buechele, Shane (KICK by Rowland, Joshua), 5-60 2:06

Third quarter

- 02:05 ISU - Eaton, Matthew 11 yd TD PASS from Park, Jacob (KICK by Owens, Garrett), 4-28 0:43

Fourth quarter

- 13:25 UT - Rowland, Joshua 49 yd FG 4-6 2:01

Top passers

- TX – Buechele, Shane
- ISU – Park, Jacob

Top rushers

- TX – Warren III, C.
- ISU – Montgomery, David

Top receivers

- TX – Humphrey, Lil'J
- ISU – Lazard, Allen

Top tacklers

- TX – Hill, Holton
- ISU – Lanning, Joel

=== Game 5: at Oklahoma Sooners ===
Game Five: Iowa State Cyclones at Oklahoma Sooners;– Game summary

Quarter	1	2	3	4	Total
Cyclones	3	10	11	14	38
#3 Sooners	14	10	0	7	31

at Gaylord Family Memorial Stadium, Norman, OK

- Date: October 7
- Game time: 11:00 a.m. CDT
- Game weather: Temperature: 68 °F (20 °C) • Wind: NW 10 • Weather: Sunny
- Game attendance: 86,019
- Referee: Referee: Reggie Smith • Umpire: Tab Slaughter • Linesman: Mike Moeller • Line judge: Mark Stewart • Back judge: Lyndon Nixon • Field judge: Matt Mills• Side judge: Tim Murray

Game information

First quarter

- 12:35 OU - Sermon, Trey 23 yd pass from Mayfield, Baker (Seibert, Austin kick), 5-81 2:25
- 05:49 OU - Lamb, CeeDee 15 yd pass from Mayfield, Baker (Seibert, Austin kick), 11-72 5:21
- 01:20 ISU - Owens, Garrett 25 yd field goal, 11-67 4:29

Second quarter

- 11:53 OU - Seibert, Austin 25 yd field goal, 11-69 4:27
- 06:12 ISU - Montgomery, Da. 2 yd run (Owens, Garrett kick), 10-75 5:41
- 02:43 OU - Mayfield, Baker 13 yd run (Seibert, Austin kick), 8-75 3:29
- 00:04 ISU - Owens, Garrett 32 yd field goal, 4-54 0:22

Third quarter

- 09:45 ISU - Owens, Garrett 42 yd field goal, 11-50 5:15
- 02:07 ISU - Murdock, M. 28 yd pass from Kempt, Kyle (Lazard, Allen pass from Kempt, Kyle), 7-94 3:28

Fourth quarter

- 12:46 ISU - Ryen, Trever 57 yd pass from Kempt, Kyle (Owens, Garrett kick), 2-73 0:57
- 07:18 OU - Flowers, D. 1 yd run (Seibert, Austin kick), 10-75 5:28
- 02:19 ISU - Lazard, Allen 25 yd pass from Kempt, Kyle (Owens, Garrett kick), 9-75 4:59

Top passers

- OK – Mayfield, Baker
- ISU – Kempt, Kyle

Top rushers

- OK – Sermon, Trey
- ISU – Montgomery, David

Top receivers

- OK – Flowers, D.
- ISU – Montgomery, Da.

Top tacklers

- OK – Johnson, Will
- ISU – Wilkerson, R.

=== Game 6: vs. Kansas Jayhawks ===
Game Six: Kansas Jayhawks at Iowa State Cyclones;– Game summary

Quarter	1	2	3	4	Total
Jayhawks	0	0	0	0	0
Cyclones	14	10	14	7	45

at Jack Trice Stadium, Ames, IA

- Date: October 14
- Game time: 11:00 a.m. CDT
- Game weather: Temperature: 58 °F (14 °C) • Wind: light and varied • Weather: Rainy
- Game attendance: 55,593
- Referee: Referee: Scott Campbell • Umpire: Joel Bellinger • Linesman: Doug Moore • Line judge: Keith Garmond • Back judge: Joel Wetzel • Field judge: Rich Almeroth • Side judge: Corey Luxner

Game information

First quarter

- 09:32 ISU - Montgomery, Da. 4 yd TD RUSH (KICK by Owens, Garrett), 2-8 0:44
- 01:30 ISU - Ryen, Trever 68 yd TD PUNT (KICK by Owens, Garrett),

Second quarter

- 05:56 ISU - Owens, Garrett 26 yd FG 9-46 3:48
- 00:20 ISU - Montgomery, Da. 1 yd TD RUSH (KICK by Owens, Garrett), 3-23 0:33

Third quarter

- 10:48 ISU - Montgomery, Da. 4 yd TD RUSH (KICK by Owens, Garrett), 4-27 1:46
- 00:00 ISU - Murdock, M. 8 yd TD PASS from Kempt, Kyle (KICK by Owens, Garrett), 5-35 2:52

Fourth quarter

- 06:03 ISU - Croney, Sheldon 10 yd TD RUSH (KICK by Owens, Garrett), 4-56 2:08

Top passers

- KU – Stanley, Carter
- ISU – Kempt, Kyle

Top rushers

- KU – Martin, Taylor
- ISU – Montgomery, David

Top receivers

- KU – Schadler, Ryan
- ISU – Lazard, Allen

Top tacklers

- KU – Dineen, Joe
- ISU – Lanning, Joel

=== Game 7: at Texas Tech Red Raiders ===
Game Seven: Iowa State Cyclones at Texas Tech Red Raiders;– Game summary

Quarter	1	2	3	4	Total
Cyclones	7	17	0	7	31
Red Raiders	6	0	7	0	13

at Jones AT&T Stadium, Lubbock, TX

- Date: October 21
- Game time: 11:00
- Game weather: Temperature: 66 °F (19 °C) • Wind: SSW 13 mph (21 km/h) • Weather: Partly Cloudy
- Game attendance: 57,045
- Referee: Referee: C. Castleberry • Umpire: Jim Adams • Linesman: Cal McNeil • Line judge: Derek Anderson • Back judge: Donnie Aultman • Field judge: Scott Gaines • Side judge: Anthony Fleming • Center Judge: Chris Tallent

Game information

First quarter

- 12:36 TTU - Nisby, Desmond 4 yd TD RUSH (KICK by Ewton, Michael NO GOOD) 3-7 1:08
- 6:26 ISU - Lazard, Allen 26 yd TD PASS from Kempt, Kyle (KICK by Owens, Garrett) 14-75 6:10

Second quarter

- 12:22 ISU - Owens, Garrett 22 yd FG 6-30 2:18
- 10:40 ISU - Eaton, Matthew 4 yd TD PASS from Kempt, Kyle (KICK by Owens, Garrett) 4-25 1:34
- 0:26 ISU - Eaton, Matthew 3 yd TD PASS from Kempt, Kyle (KICK by Owens, Garrett) 10-80 3:52

Third quarter

- 5:31 TTU - Shimonek, Nic 2 yd TD RUSH (KICK by Barden, Michael) 12-77 3:53

Fourth quarter

- 9:07 ISU - Spears Jr., Marcel 61 yd TD INT (KICK by Owens, Garrett)

Top passers

- TTU – Shimonek, Nic
- ISU – Kempt, Kyle

Top rushers

- TTU – King, Tre
- ISU – Montgomery, David

Top receivers

- TTU – Coutee, Keke
- ISU – Murdock, Marchie

Top tacklers

- TTU – Johnson, Jah'Shawn
- ISU – Harvey Jr., Willie

=== Game 8: vs. TCU Horned Frogs ===
Game Eight: TCU Horned Frogs at Iowa State Cyclones;– Game summary

Quarter	1	2	3	4	Total
#4 Horned Frogs	0	0	7	0	7
#25 Cyclones	7	7	0	0	14

at Jack Trice Stadium, Ames, IA

- Date: October 28
- Game time: 2:30
- Game weather: Temperature: 42 °F (6 °C) • Wind: WNW 5–10 mph (8.0–16.1 km/h) • Weather: Clear and Sunny
- Game attendance: 56,259
- Referee: Referee: Brandon Cruse • Umpire: Rick Podraza • Linesman: B. Edwards • Line judge: Quentin Givens • Back judge: Daniel Young • Field judge: Glenn Crowther • Side judge: Tuta Salaam

Game information

First quarter

- 7:45 ISU - Eaton, Matthew 17 yd TD PASS from Kempt, Kyle (KICK by Owens, Garrett) 9-85 4:22

Second quarter

- 3:29 ISU - Butler, Hakeem 4 yd TD PASS from Kempt, Kyle (KICK by Owens, Garrett) 11-82 3:35

Third quarter

- 14:48 TCU - Turpin, KaVontae 94 yd KR TD (KICK by Song, Jonathan) 0-0 0:12

Fourth quarter

Top passers

- TCU – Hill Jr., Kenny
- ISU – Kempt, Kyle

Top rushers

- TCU – Anderson, Darius
- ISU – Montgomery, David

Top receivers

- TCU – Austin, Jaelan
- ISU – Lazard, Allen

Top tacklers

- TCU – Summers, Ty
- ISU – Wilkerson, Reggie

=== Game 9: at West Virginia Mountaineers ===
Game Nine: Iowa State Cyclones at West Virginia Mountaineers;– Game summary

Quarter	1	2	3	4	Total
#14 Cyclones	0	3	10	3	16
Mountaineers	10	10	0	0	20

at Mountaineer Field, Morgantown, WV

- Date: November 4
- Game time: 3:30 p.m. EDT
- Game weather: Temperature: 66 °F (19 °C) • Wind: calm • Weather: Overcast
- Game attendance: 55,831
- Referee: Referee: Dan Romeo • Umpire: Scott Teifer • Linesman: Andy Warner • Line judge: Darren Deckard • Back judge: Chris Alston • Field judge: Matt Mills • Side judge: Jim Murphy Center judge: Ken Ray

Game information

First quarter

- 13:39 WVU - Sills V, David 10 yd pass from Grier, Will (Staley, Evan kick)
- 10:02 WVU - Staley, Evan 28 yd field goal, 8-37 2:37

Second quarter

- 11:59 WVU - White, Ka'Raun 55 yd pass from Grier, Will (Staley, Evan kick)
- 06:20 WVU - Staley, Evan 36 yd field goal, 10-50 4:18
- 01:46 ISU - Owens, Garrett 42 yd field goal, 8-43 4:27

Third quarter

- 10:48 ISU - Lazard, Allen 1 yd pass from Kempt, Kyle (Owens, Garrett kick)
- 02:29 ISU - Owens, Garrett 18 yd field goal, 10-65 3:39

Fourth quarter

- 07:19 ISU - Owens, Garrett 24 yd field goal, 13-67 4:59

Top passers

- WVU – Grier, Will
- ISU – Kempt, Kyle

Top rushers

- WVU – Crawford, Justin
- ISU – Montgomery, David

Top receivers

- WVU – White, Ka'Raun
- ISU – Murdock, Marchie

Top tacklers

- WVU – Bailey, Hakeem
- ISU – Payne, D'Andre

=== Game 10: vs. Oklahoma State Cowboys ===
Game Ten: Oklahoma State Cowboys at Iowa State Cyclones;– Game summary

Quarter	1	2	3	4	Total
#12 Cowboys	7	14	10	18	49
#24 Cyclones	14	7	7	14	42

at Jack Trice Stadium, Ames, IA

- Date: November 11
- Game time: 11:00 a.m. CST
- Game weather: Temperature: 40 °F (4 °C) • Wind: S 5–10 miles per hour (8.0–16.1 km/h) • Weather: Overcast
- Game attendance: 61,500
- Referee: Referee: Brad Van Vark • Umpire: Michael Cooper • Linesman: George Gusman • Line judge: Frank LeBlanc • Back judge: Brian Ernest • Field judge: Jason Ledet • Side judge: Fulton Carson
- TV: ABC/ESPN2

Game information

First quarter

- 10:02 ISU - Lazard, Allen 14 yd TD PASS from Kempt, Kyle (KICK by Owens, Garrett), 11-73 4:58
- 04:52 ISU - Montgomery, Da. 22 yd TD RUSH (KICK by Owens, Garrett), 8-64 3:55
- 01:31 OSU - Ateman, Marcell 21 yd TD PASS from Rudolph, Mason (KICK by Ammendola, Matt), 8-73 3:14

Second quarter

- 12:38 OSU - Hill, Justice 9 yd TD RUSH (KICK by Ammendola, Matt), 5-32 2:14
- 08:27 OSU - Hill, Justice 2 yd TD RUSH (KICK by Ammendola, Matt), 5-60 2:24
- 00:22 ISU - Lanning, Joel 1 yd TD RUSH (KICK by Owens, Garrett), 7-91 1:51

Third quarter

- 10:17 OSU - Ammendola, Matt 35 yd FG 10-58 4:43
- 06:57 ISU - Montgomery, Da. 3 yd TD RUSH (KICK by Owens, Garrett), 8-71 3:15
- 01:27 OSU - Hill, Justice 1 yd TD RUSH (KICK by Ammendola, Matt), 2-82 0:22

Fourth quarter

- 14:13 ISU - Lazard, Allen 22 yd TD PASS from Lanning, Joel (KICK by Owens, Garrett), 5-72 2:06
- 09:43 OSU - Ammendola, Matt 41 yd FG 10-52 4:30
- 08:38 ISU - Montgomery, Da. 4 yd TD RUSH (KICK by Owens, Garrett), 4-75 1:05
- 05:55 OSU - Ateman, Marcell 30 yd TD PASS from Rudolph, Mason (RUSH by Hill, Justice), 7-75 2:43
- 03:47 OSU - Stoner, Dillon 19 yd TD PASS from Rudolph, Mason (KICK by Ammendola, Matt), 3-51 1:14

Top passers

- OSU – Rudolph, Mason
- ISU – Noland, Zeb

Top rushers

- OSU – Hill, Justice
- ISU – Montgomery, DavidMontgomery, David

Top receivers

- OSU – McCleskey, Jalen
- ISU – Lazard, Allen

Top tacklers

- OSU – Williams, Rodarius
- ISU – Cotton-Moya, Kamari

=== Game 11: at Baylor Bears ===
Game Eleven: Iowa State Cyclones at Baylor Bears;– Game summary

Quarter	1	2	3	4	Total
Cyclones	7	10	3	3	23
Bears	7	3	3	0	13

at McLane Stadium, Waco, TX

- Date: November 18
- Game time: 1:30 p.m. CST
- Game weather: Temperature: 70 °F (21 °C) • Wind: NW 20–25 mph (32–40 km/h) • Weather: Fair, Windy
- Game attendance: 40,653
- Referee: Referee: Mike Defee • Umpire: Robert Richeson • Linesman: Al Green • Line judge: Derek Anderson • Back judge: Terry Jones • Field judge: Joe Blubaugh • Side judge: Lo vanPham • Center Judge: Marvel July

Game information

First quarter

- 10:59 BU - Wainright, Ishmail 12 yd TD PASS from Brewer, Charlie (KICK by Martin, Connor), 6-66 2:04
- 6:09 ISU - Lazard, Allen 36 yd TD PASS from Noland, Zeb (KICK by Owens, Garrett), 6-65 1:49

Second quarter

- 13:50 BU - Martin, Connor 27 yd FG 19-74 7:19
- 8:05 ISU - Owens, Garrett 34 yd FG 16-64 5:45
- 2:19 ISU - Butler, Hakeem 67 yd TD PASS from Noland, Zeb (KICK by Owens, Garrett), 1-67 0:13

Third quarter

- 12:24 BU - Martin, Connor 47 yd FG 6-45 2:36
- 6:25 ISU - Owens, Garrett 22 yd FG 17-75 5:59

Fourth quarter

- 7:01 ISU - Owens, Garrett 45 yd FG 8-64, 3:25

Top passers

- BU – Brewer, Charlie
- ISU – Noland, Zeb

Top rushers

- BU – Hasty, JaMycal
- ISU – Montgomery, David

Top receivers

- BU – Mims, Denzel
- ISU – Butler, Hakeem

Top tacklers

- BU – Jones Jr., Lenoy
- ISU – Peavy, Brian

=== Game 12: at Kansas State Wildcats ===
Game Twelve: Iowa State Cyclones at Kansas State Wildcats;– Game summary

Quarter	1	2	3	4	Total
Cyclones	3	3	6	7	19
Wildcats	0	7	0	13	20

at Bill Snyder Family Football Stadium, Manhattan, KS

- Date: November 25
- Game time: 2:30 p.m. CST
- Game weather: Temperature: 59 °F (15 °C) • Wind: NW 4–13 mph (6.4–20.9 km/h) • Weather: Sunny
- Game attendance: 49,554
- Referee: Referee: Reggie Smith • Umpire: Tab Slaughter • Linesman: Mike Moeller • Line judge: Mark Stewart • Back judge: Lyndon Nixon • Field judge: Matt Mills • Side judge: Tim Murray

Game information

First quarter

- 07:52 ISU - Owens, Garrett 36 yd field goal 15 plays, 56 yards, TOP 7:08

Second quarter

- 12:54 KS - Thompson, S. 3 yd run (McCrane, M. kick ), 8 plays, 31 yards, TOP 5:11
- 01:33 ISU - Owens, Garrett 22 yd field goal 9 plays, 55 yards, TOP 2:22

Third quarter

- 08:34 ISU - Murdock, M. 9 yd pass from Kempt, Kyle (Kempt, Kyle pass failed) 11 plays, 85 yards, TOP 4:57

Fourth quarter

- 13:46 ISU - Butler, Hakeem 3 yd pass from Kempt, Kyle (Owens, Garrett kick) 10 plays, 62 yards, TOP 6:12
- 06:07 KS - Dimel, Winston 3 yd pass from Barnes, Alex (McCrane, M. kick) 13 plays, 68 yards, TOP 7:28
- 00:00 KS - Zuber, Isaiah 1 yd pass from Thompson, S. (TEAM rush failed) 10 plays, 87 yards, TOP 1:55

Top passers

- KSU – Thompson, Skylar
- ISU – Kempt, Kyle

Top rushers

- KSU – Warmack, Davin
- ISU – Warren, Mike

Top receivers

- KSU – Zuber, Isaiah
- ISU – Lazard, Allen

Top tacklers

- KSU – Kirby, Jayd
- ISU – Lanning, Joel

=== Game 13: @ Memphis Tigers (Liberty Bowl) ===
Game Thirteen: Iowa State Cyclones at Memphis Tigers;– Game summary

Quarter	1	2	3	4	Total
Cyclones	7	7	7	0	21
Tigers	7	3	10	0	20

at Liberty Bowl Memorial Stadium, Memphis, TN

- Date: December 30
- Game time: 11:30 a.m. CST
- Game weather: Temperature: °F • Wind: • Weather:
- Game attendance: 57,266
- Referee: Referee: • Umpire: • Linesman: • Line judge: • Back judge: • Field judge: • Side judge:

Game information

First quarter

- 13:09 ISU - Hakeem Butler 52-yard touchdown reception from Kyle Kempt, Garrett Owens kick good
- 6:00 MEM - Anthony Miller 10-yard touchdown reception from Riley Ferguson, Riley Patterson kick good

Second quarter

- 4:28 ISU - Joel Lanning 2-yard touchdown run, Garrett Owens kick good
- 0:00 MEM - 34-yard field goal by Riley Patterson

Third quarter

- 13:22 MEM -Phil Mayhue 36-yard touchdown reception from Riley Ferguson, Riley Patterson kick good
- 4:28 ISU - Allen Lazard 5-yard touchdown reception from Kyle Kempt, Garrett Owens kick good
- 2:16 MEM -30-yard field goal by Riley Patterson

Fourth quarter

Top passers

- MEM – Riley Ferguson
- ISU – Kyle Kempt

Top rushers

- MEM – Patrick Taylor Jr.
- ISU – David Montgomery

Top receivers

- MEM – Phil Mayhue
- ISU – Allen Lazard

Top tacklers

- MEM – Jonathan Cook
- ISU – Marcel Spears Jr.

== Personnel ==
=== Coaching staff ===
Coaching staff
Name	Position	Alma mater	Seasons at ISU
Matt Campbell	Head coach	Mount Union, 2002	2nd
Jon Heacock	Defensive coordinator, Safeties	Muskingum, 1983	2nd
Tom Manning	Offensive coordinator, offensive line	Mount Union, 2002	2nd
Louis Ayeni	Associate head coach, Running game coordinator	Northwestern, 2003	4th
Brian Gasser	Wide receivers, Special Teams	Ohio Northern, 2006	2nd
Alex Golesh	Tight Ends, Recruiting Coordinator	Ohio State, 2006	2nd
Joel Gordon	Offensive analyst	Shepherd, 2003	2nd
Jim Hofher	Passing game coordinator	Cornell, 1979	2nd
D.K. McDonald	Cornerbacks	Edinboro, 2001	2nd
Eli Rasheed	Defensive line	Indiana, 1996	2nd
Tyson Veidt	Assistant head coach, Linebackers	Muskingum, 1996	2nd
Rudy Wade	Strength and Conditioning	Ball State, 2001	2nd
Jake Waters	Graduate assistant	Kansas State, 2014	1st

=== Roster ===
2017 Iowa State Cyclones Football
Quarterback: 4 Zeb Noland - (redshirt) Freshman (6'3", 220); 10 Jacob Park - (redshirt) Junior (6'4", 205); 16 Kyle Starcevich - (redshirt) Junior (6'3", 220); 17 Kyle Kempt - (redshirt) Senior (6'5", 220); Running back: 2 Mike Warren - (redshirt) Junior (6'0", 205); 3 Kene Nwangwu - Sophomore (6'1", 188); 25 Sheldon Croney Jr. - (redshirt) Sophomore (5'11", 205); 27 Nick Leach - (redshirt) Junior (6'2", 210); 32 David Montgomery - Sophomore (5'11", 222); Daric Whipple - (redshirt) Freshman (5'11", 187); Wide receiver: 5 Allen Lazard - Senior (6'5", 223); 8 Deshaunte Jones - Sophomore (5'10", 175); 14 Darius Lee-Campbell - (redshirt) Junior (6'2", 205); 16 Marchie Murdock - (redshirt) Senior (6'1", 195); 18 Hakeem Butler - (redshirt) Sophomore (6'6", 195); 19 Trever Ryen - (redshirt) Senior (5'11", 192); 80 Carson Epps - Junior (6'1", 205); 81 Denver Johnson - (redshirt) Sophomore (6'3", 210); 82 Landen Akers - (redshirt) Freshman (6'0", 185); 83 Jalen Martin - (redshirt) Freshman (6'3", 205); 84 Amechie Walker - (redshirt) Sophomore (5'10", 175); 85 Colby Shane - (redshirt) Freshman (6'2", 189); Placekicker: 38 Peyton Paddock - (redshirt) Sophomore (5'11", 205); 41 Chris Francis - (redshirt) Junior (6'0", 180); 82 John Banta - (redshirt) Freshman (6'0", 200); 96 Connor Assalley - (redshirt) Freshman (6'0", 220)	Tight end: 11 Chase Allen - (redshirt) Freshman (6'6", 230); 47 Sam Seonbuchner - (redshirt) Junior (6'2", 240); 86 Cole Anderson - (redshirt) Junior (6'4", 250); 87 Sam Harms - Senior (6'3", 235); 89 Dylan Soehner - (redshirt) Freshman (6'7", 283); 90 Nathan Fagnani - (redshirt) Freshman (6'3", 219); Offensive lineman: 50 Bryan Larson - (redshirt) Senior (6'4", 285); 51 Julian Good-Jones - (redshirt) Sophomore (6'5", 295); 54 Josh Mueller - (redshirt) Freshman (6'6", 298); 67 Jake Campos - (redshirt) Senior (6'8", 305); 69 Kory Kodanko - (redshirt) Junior (6'5", 305); 70 Oge Udeogu - (redshirt) Junior (6'3", 325); 71 Robby Garcia - (redshirt) Senior (6'4", 285); 73 Will Windham - (redshirt) Junior (6'3", 305); 74 Bryce Meeker - (redshirt) Sophomore (6'5", 305); 75 Sean Foster - (redshirt) Freshman (6'8", 290); 77 Keegan Pullis - (redshirt) Freshman (6'4", 275); 78 Colby Lafrenz - (redshirt) Freshman (6'6", 288); 79 Shawn Curtis - (redshirt) Senior (6'5", 295); Defensive lineman: 20 Joshua Bailey - (redshirt) Freshman (6'2", 294); 54 Collin Olson - (redshirt) Sophomore (6'2", 270); 92 Jamahl Johnson - Sophomore (6'1", 318); 99 Vernell Trent - (redshirt) Senior (6'3", 275); Defensive end: 19 JaQuan Bailey - Sophomore (6'3", 260); 31 Conner Greene - (redshirt) Sophomore (6'2", 235); 45 Carson Lensing - (redshirt) Freshman (6'4", 227); 46 Spencer Benton - (redshirt) Junior (6'2", 245); 50 Eyioma Uwazurike - (redshirt) Freshman (6'6", 250); 51 Logan Wolf - (redshirt) Freshman (6'4", 239); 58 J. D. Waggoner - (redshirt) Senior (6'3", 255); 66 Noah Juergensen - (redshirt) Freshman (6'5", 257); 80 Vince Horras - (redshirt) Junior (6'6", 230)	Linebacker: 2 Willie Harvey Jr. - (redshirt) Junior (6'0", 225); 7 Joel Lanning - (redshirt) Senior (6'2", 225); 9 Reggan Northrup - (redshirt) Junior (6'1", 205); 20 Aaron Austin - (redshirt) Freshman (5'11", 197); 39 Zach Silbermann - (redshirt) Freshman (6'1", 230); 40 Jared Gescheidler - (redshirt) Sophomore (6'2", 240); 42 Marcel Spears Jr. - (redshirt) Sophomore (6'1", 222); 43 Tymar Sutton - (redshirt) Freshman (5'10", 230); 44 Bobby McMillen III - (redshirt) Sophomore (6'1", 230); 48 Jason Bowman - (redshirt) Junior (6'3", 210); 49 Jack Spreen - (redshirt) Senior (6'1", 210); Defensive back: 1 D'Andre Payne - (redshirt) Junior (5'10", 190); 3 Mike Johnson - (redshirt) Sophomore (5'11", 195); 4 Evrett Edwards - (redshirt) Senior (5'11", 190); 5 Kamari Cotton-Moya - (redshirt) Senior (6'1", 200); 6 De'Monte Ruth - (redshirt) Junior (5'9", 174); 10 Brian Peavy - (redshirt) Junior (5'9", 190); 14 Lawrence White - (redshirt) Freshman (6'0", 178); 15 Stephon Pickett-Brown - (redshirt) Sophomore (6'0", 180); 16 Vic Holmes - (redshirt) Junior (5'11", 202); 21 Jatairis Grant - (redshirt) Freshman (6'0", 190); 24 Jamaal Richardson - (redshirt) Junior (6'1", 198); 27 Romelo Webster - (redshirt) Freshman (5'10", 175); 32 Arnold Azunna - (redshirt) Freshman (5'11", 183); 33 Braxton Lewis - (redshirt) Sophomore (5'11", 185); 37 Mackenro Alexander - (redshirt) Senior (5'11", 205); Long Snappers: 39 Steven Wirtel - Sophomore (6'4", 214); 60 Quinn Sonntag - (redshirt) Sophomore (6'0", 226); Punter: 13 Colin Downing - Senior (5'11", 185); 98 Joe Rivera - (redshirt) Freshman (6'2", 181)
: 2017 Iowa State Cyclones Football Commits (01/27/2017)

=== Returning starters ===
Iowa State had 13 returning players on offense, 11 on defense and 5 on special teams that started games previously for the Cyclones.

==== Returning offensive starters ====
Returning offensive tarters
Player	Class	Position
Joel Lanning	Senior	Quarterback
Jacob Park	Junior	Quarterback
David Montgomery	Sophomore	Running back
Mike Warren	Junior	Running back
Allen Lazard	Senior	Wide receiver
Trever Ryen	Senior	Wide receiver
Deshaunte Jones	Sophomore	Wide receiver
Carson Epps	Junior	Wide receiver
Hakeem Butler	Sophomore	Wide receiver
Sam Harms	Senior	Tight end
Jake Campos	Senior	Offensive line
Julian Good-Jones	Sophomore	Offensive line
Bryce Meeker	Sophomore	Offensive line

==== Returning defensive starters ====
Returning defensive starters
Player	Class	Position
Kamari Cotton-Moya	Senior	Defensive back
Brian Peavy	Junior	Defensive back
D'Andre Payne	Junior	Defensive back
Mike Johnson	Sophomore	Defensive back
Evrett Edwards	Senior	Defensive back
Willie Harvey Jr.	Junior	Linebacker
Reggan Northupp	Junior	Linebacker
Brian Mills	Senior	Linebacker
JaQuan Bailey	Sophomore	Defensive end
J. D. Waggoner	Senior	Defensive end
Vernell Trent	Senior	Defensive lineman

==== Returning special teams starters ====
Returning special teams starters
Player	Class	Position
Colin Downing	Senior	Punter
Steven Wirtel	Sophomore	Long snapper
Quinn Sonntag	Sophomore	Deep snapper
Trever Ryen	Senior	Punt returner
Kene Nwangwu	Sophomore	Kick returner

=== Recruiting class ===
College recruiting information
Name	Hometown	School	Height	Weight	Commit date
Devon Moore; QB	Waterloo, IA	Waterloo West	6 ft 4 in (1.93 m)	221 lb (100 kg)	Nov 30, 2015
Devon Moore; QB	Recruit ratings: Scout: Rivals: 247Sports: ESPN: (77)				
Matthew Eaton; WR	Pascagoula, MS	Pascagoula	6 ft 4 in (1.93 m)	205 lb (93 kg)	May 6, 2016
Matthew Eaton; WR	Recruit ratings: Scout: Rivals: 247Sports: ESPN: (80)				
Josh Johnson; WR	Maumelle, AR	Central Arkansas Christian	5 ft 11 in (1.80 m)	170 lb (77 kg)	Mar 28, 2016
Josh Johnson; WR	Recruit ratings: Scout: Rivals: 247Sports: ESPN: (80)				
Tarique Milton; WR	Bradenton, FL	Manatee High	5 ft 11 in (1.80 m)	165 lb (75 kg)	Feb 1, 2017
Tarique Milton; WR	Recruit ratings: Scout: Rivals: 247Sports: ESPN: (NR)				
Charlie Kolar; TE	Norman, OK	Norman North	6 ft 6 in (1.98 m)	227 lb (103 kg)	Jun 24, 2016
Charlie Kolar; TE	Recruit ratings: Scout: Rivals: 247Sports: ESPN: (77)				
Khaliel Rodgers; OT	Bear, DE	Eastern Christian	6 ft 3 in (1.91 m)	305 lb (138 kg)	Jan 29, 2017
Khaliel Rodgers; OT	Recruit ratings: Scout: Rivals: 247Sports: ESPN: (82)				
Colin Newell; OT	Ames, IA	Ames High	6 ft 5 in (1.96 m)	260 lb (120 kg)	Apr 2, 2016
Colin Newell; OT	Recruit ratings: Scout: Rivals: 247Sports: ESPN: (77)				
Robert Hudson; OT	Walled Lake, MI	Walled Lake Western	6 ft 8 in (2.03 m)	320 lb (150 kg)	Jan 17, 2017
Robert Hudson; OT	Recruit ratings: Scout: Rivals: 247Sports: ESPN: (75)				
Alex Kleinow; OT	Iowa City, IA	Iowa City West	6 ft 6 in (1.98 m)	290 lb (130 kg)	Jun 25, 2016
Alex Kleinow; OT	Recruit ratings: Scout: Rivals: 247Sports: ESPN: (74)				
Jacob Bolton; OT	Roswell, GA	Blessed Trinity	6 ft 5 in (1.96 m)	285 lb (129 kg)	Jan 25, 1017
Jacob Bolton; OT	Recruit ratings: Scout: Rivals: 247Sports: ESPN: (73)				
David Dawson; OG	Detroit, MI	Cass Technical	6 ft 4 in (1.93 m)	325 lb (147 kg)	Jan 15, 2017
David Dawson; OG	Recruit ratings: Scout: Rivals: 247Sports: ESPN: (84)				
Jeff Nogaj; OG	Johntown, OH	Johnstown-Monroe	6 ft 5 in (1.96 m)	291 lb (132 kg)	Apr 10, 2016
Jeff Nogaj; OG	Recruit ratings: Scout: Rivals: 247Sports: ESPN: (72)				
Ray Lima; DT	Torrance, CA	El Camino	6 ft 3 in (1.91 m)	310 lb (140 kg)	Aug 7, 2016
Ray Lima; DT	Recruit ratings: Scout: Rivals: 247Sports: ESPN: (79)				
Kamilo Tongamoa; DT	Merced, CA	Merced College	6 ft 5 in (1.96 m)	320 lb (150 kg)	Aug 7, 2016
Kamilo Tongamoa; DT	Recruit ratings: Scout: Rivals: 247Sports: ESPN: (79)				
Angel Dominguez; SDE	Lenexa, KS	St. Thomas Aquinas	6 ft 3 in (1.91 m)	250 lb (110 kg)	Apr 25, 2016
Angel Dominguez; SDE	Recruit ratings: Scout: Rivals: 247Sports: ESPN: (77)				
Tucker Robertson; SDE	Simi Valley, CA	Grace Brethren	6 ft 3 in (1.91 m)	270 lb (120 kg)	Jan 12, 2017
Tucker Robertson; SDE	Recruit ratings: Scout: Rivals: 247Sports: ESPN: (75)				
Dan Sichterman; SDE	Kings Mills, OH	Kings High	6 ft 3 in (1.91 m)	235 lb (107 kg)	Oct 30, 2016
Dan Sichterman; SDE	Recruit ratings: Scout: Rivals: 247Sports: ESPN: (70)				
John Nagel; SDE	Manchester, IA	West Delaware	6 ft 6 in (1.98 m)	240 lb (110 kg)	Sep 16, 2016
John Nagel; SDE	Recruit ratings: Scout: Rivals: 247Sports: ESPN: (68)				
Matt Leo; WDE	Adelaide, AUS	Arizona Western	6 ft 7 in (2.01 m)	265 lb (120 kg)	Dec 14, 2016
Matt Leo; WDE	Recruit ratings: Scout: Rivals: 247Sports: ESPN: (79)				
Cordarrius Bailey; WDE	Clarksdale, MS	Clarksdale High	6 ft 4 in (1.93 m)	210 lb (95 kg)	Sep 8, 2016
Cordarrius Bailey; WDE	Recruit ratings: Scout: Rivals: 247Sports: ESPN: (72)				
Jake Hummel; ILB	West Des Moines, IA	Dowling	6 ft 2 in (1.88 m)	210 lb (95 kg)	Apr 23, 2016
Jake Hummel; ILB	Recruit ratings: Scout: Rivals: 247Sports: ESPN: (74)				
O'Rien Vance; OLB	Cedar Rapids, IA	Washington High	6 ft 3 in (1.91 m)	235 lb (107 kg)	Feb 15, 2016
O'Rien Vance; OLB	Recruit ratings: Scout: Rivals: 247Sports: ESPN: (79)				
Richard Bowens III; CB	Orchard Lake Village, MI	St. Mary's	6 ft 1 in (1.85 m)	170 lb (77 kg)	Apr 13, 2016
Richard Bowens III; CB	Recruit ratings: Scout: Rivals: 247Sports: ESPN: (72)				
O.J. Tucker; CB	Ocala, FL	Vanguard High	6 ft 1 in (1.85 m)	170 lb (77 kg)	Jan 15, 2017
O.J. Tucker; CB	Recruit ratings: Scout: Rivals: 247Sports: ESPN: (75)				
Datrone Young; CB	Delray Beach, FL	Atlantic High	5 ft 10 in (1.78 m)	170 lb (77 kg)	Nov 25, 2016
Datrone Young; CB	Recruit ratings: Scout: Rivals: 247Sports: ESPN: (73)				
Overall recruit ranking: Scout: 48 Rivals: 42 247Sports: 51
Note: In many cases, Scout, Rivals, 247Sports, On3, and ESPN may conflict in their listings of height and weight.; In these cases, the average was taken. ESPN grades are on a 100-point scale.; Sources: "2017 Iowa State Football Commitment List". Rivals.; "2017 Iowa State Recruiting Class". ESPN.; "2017 Team Ranking". Rivals.com.; "Iowa State 2017 Football Commits". 247Sports.

== Awards and honors ==
All-Big 12
Player	Selection
Offense
David Montgomery	Coaches-1; Media-1
Allen Lazard	Coaches-1; Media-2
Jake Campos	Coaches-2; Media-2
Chase Allen	Coaches-2
Hakeem Butler	Coaches-HM
Julian Good-Jones	Coaches-HM
Kyle Kempt	Coaches-HM
Sam Seonbuchner	Coaches-HM
Defense
Kamari Cotton-Moya	Coaches-1; Media-1
Joel Lanning	Coaches-2; Media-1
Brian Peavy	Coaches-2; Media-2
J. D. Waggoner	Coaches-2
JaQuan Bailey	Coaches-HM
Willie Harvey Jr.	Coaches-HM
Ray Lima	Coaches-HM
Marcel Spears Jr.	Coaches-HM
Special Teams
Colin Downing	Coaches-HM
Garrett Owens	Coaches-HM
Trever Ryen	Coaches-HM

All-Americans
Player	Organization	Team
Joel Lanning	FWAA	First Team
Joel Lanning	Sports Illustrated	Second Team

Individual Awards
Player	Award
Matt Campbell	Chuck Neinas Big 12 Coach of the Year
Matt Campbell	AP Big 12 Coach of the Year
Allen Lazard	2017 Liberty Bowl MVP

Weekly Awards
Player	Award	Date Awarded
Kyle Kempt	Big 12 Offensive Player of the Week	October 7, 2016
Joel Lanning	Walter Camp National Defensive Player of the Week	October 7, 2017
Joel Lanning	Big 12 Defensive Player of the Week	October 7, 2017
Trever Ryen	Big 12 Special Teams Player of the Week	October 14, 2017
Marcel Spears Jr.	Big 12 Defensive Player of the Week	October 21, 2017
Marcel Spears Jr.	Big 12 Defensive Player of the Week	October 28, 2017
Brian Peavy	Big 12 Co-defensive Player of the Week	November 18, 2017
Garrett Owens	Big 12 Special Teams Player of the Week	November 18, 2017
