= Marcel Spears Jr. =

American football player (born 1997)

No. 52
- Position: Linebacker

Personal information
- Born: May 29, 1997 (age 29); Olathe, Kansas, U.S.
- Listed height: 6 ft 1 in (1.85 m)
- Listed weight: 215 lb (98 kg)

Career information
- High school: Olathe North
- College: Iowa State
- NFL draft: 2020: undrafted

Career history
- Cincinnati Bengals (2020)*; Houston Gamblers (2023)
- * Offseason or practice squad member only

Marcel Spears Jr. (born May 29, 1997) is an American former football linebacker. He played college football at Iowa State. At the conclusion of the 2017 season, Spears was named to the honorable mention All-Big 12 team. During the 2017 football season he was named Big 12 Defensive Player of the Week twice, in back-to-back weeks.

== Early life ==
At Olathe North, Spears was a three-sport athlete. He wrestled and competed in track & field in addition to starring on the football field. His first year starting, as a sophomore, Spears began to bloom with 132 tackles including 10 for a loss. As a junior he recorded 119 tackles, forced three fumbles, recovered two fumbles, intercepted two passes and blocked two kicks. His senior season he made 86 tackles, seven for a loss, made two sacks, two interceptions and forced a fumble. He was named All-Sunflower League twice and received second-team all-state honors by the Wichita Eagle his senior season. He ended his impressive prep career with 227 tackles, 21 for a loss, seven sacks, and four interceptions.

=== Recruiting ===
A three star recruit, Spear's only offers were Iowa State, Missouri, Kansas, Idaho, and Wyoming. On July 28, 2014 he committed to the Cyclones.

College recruiting
Name	Hometown	School	Height	Weight	Commit date
Marcel Spears Jr. OLB	Olathe, Kansas	Olathe North	6 ft 0 in (1.83 m)	200 lb (91 kg)	Jul 28, 2014
Marcel Spears Jr. OLB	Recruit ratings: Scout: Rivals: 247Sports: (74)				
Overall recruit ranking: 247Sports: 1,117, 10 (KS), 66(OLB) ESPN: 11 (KS), 108 (OLB)
Note: In many cases, Scout, Rivals, 247Sports, On3, and ESPN may conflict in their listings of height and weight.; In these cases, the average was taken. ESPN grades are on a 100-point scale.; Sources: "2015 Iowa State Football Commitment List". Rivals.; "2015 Iowa State Football Commits". Scout.; "ESPN". ESPN.; "Scout.com Team Recruiting Rankings". Scout.; "2015 Team Ranking". Rivals.com.

== College career ==
=== 2017 season ===
After redshirting the 2015 season and only playing on special teams in 2016, Spears had his breakout season in 2017. He was second on the team in tackles with 96 as well as second on the team in interceptions with two. His 96 tackles were good for sixth in the Big 12 and his 48 assisted tackles were second in the Big 12, only behind Joel Lanning. Against Iowa, Spears made 17 tackles with 1.5 of them for a loss and two weeks later he totaled 14 tackles against Texas. His best two games were against Texas Tech and TCU. Against the Red Raiders Marcel made seven tackles, defended a pass, and made a pick 6 to seal the game. The following week he made nine tackles, one for a loss, and an interception for the second consecutive week. Spears received the Big 12 Defensive Player of the Week award for his performances in both the Texas Tech and TCU games.

At the conclusion of the season he was named Honorable mention All-Big 12 by the Big 12 coaches.

=== College statistics ===
Year	Team	Games		Tackles				Interceptions					Fumbles	
Year	Team	G	GS	Comb	Solo	Ast	TFL	PD	Int	Yds	Avg	TD	FF	FR
2016	Iowa State	11	0	4	4	0	0.0	0	0	0	0.0	0	0	0
2017	Iowa State	13	13	107	56	51	8.5	3	2	61	30.5	1	1	0
College totals		24	13	111	60	51	8.5	3	2	61	30.5	1	1	0

== Professional career ==
Spears signed with the Cincinnati Bengals as an undrafted free agent on April 28, 2020. He was waived on September 5, 2020.

=== Houston Gamblers ===
Spears Jr. signed with the Houston Gamblers of the USFL on March 23, 2023.

Spears and all other Houston Gamblers players and coaches were all transferred to the Houston Roughnecks after it was announced that the Gamblers took on the identity of their XFL counterpart, the Roughnecks. He was not part of the roster after the 2024 UFL dispersal draft on January 15, 2024.
