= 2017 Liberty Bowl =

2017 AutoZone Liberty Bowl
- 59th Liberty Bowl
Iowa State Cyclones	Memphis Tigers
(7–5)	(10–2)
Big 12	The American
21	20
Head coach: Matt Campbell	Head coach: Mike Norvell
	AP / Coaches / CFP; 18 / 19 / 20
	1	2	3	4	Total
Iowa State	7	7	7	0	21
Memphis	7	3	10	0	20
- Date: December 30, 2017
- Season: 2017
- Stadium: Liberty Bowl Memorial Stadium
- Location: Memphis, Tennessee
- MVP: Allen Lazard (WR, Iowa State)
- Favorite: Memphis by 1.5
- Referee: Duane Heydt (ACC)
- Halftime show: The Isley Brothers
- Attendance: 57,266
- Payout: US$4,700,000

United States TV coverage
- Network: ABC/ESPN Radio
- Announcers: TV: Mike Patrick, Tommy Tuberville, Paul Carcaterra; Radio: Bill Roth, Barrett Jones, Dawn Davenport

The 2017 Liberty Bowl was a post-season American college football bowl game played on December 30, 2017, at Liberty Bowl Memorial Stadium in Memphis, Tennessee. The 59th edition of the Liberty Bowl featured the Iowa State Cyclones of the Big 12 Conference against the Memphis Tigers of the American Athletic Conference. It was one of the 2017–18 bowl games concluding the 2017 FBS football season. Sponsored by automobile parts and accessories store AutoZone, it was officially known as the AutoZone Liberty Bowl.

This was the last event that ESPN Play-by-Play announcer, Mike Patrick, called.

== Teams ==
The game featured conference tie-ins from the Southeastern Conference and the Big 12 Conference. However, the SEC did not have enough teams to fill its contractual obligations, so the bowl invited the Memphis Tigers of the American Athletic Conference, the team that occupies the Liberty Bowl during the regular season, thus making the contest—which was the Tigers' first appearance in this bowl—a Memphis home game. This is the third Liberty Bowl for Iowa State, having previously played in the 1972 and 2012 editions of the game.

== Game summary ==
=== Scoring summary ===
Scoring summary

Quarter	Time	Drive			Team	Scoring information	Score	
Quarter	Time	Plays	Yards	TOP	Team	Scoring information	ISU	MEM
1	13:09	6	65	1:51	ISU	Hakeem Butler 52-yard touchdown reception from Kyle Kempt, Garrett Owens kick good	7	0
1	06:00	2	40	0:16	MEM	Anthony Miller 10-yard touchdown reception from Riley Ferguson, Riley Patterson kick good	7	7
2	04:28	12	55	6:05	ISU	Joel Lanning 2-yard touchdown run, Garrett Owens kick good	14	7
2	00:00	8	49	1:18	MEM	34-yard field goal by Riley Patterson	14	10
3	13:22	4	66	1:38	MEM	Phil Mayhue 36-yard touchdown reception from Riley Ferguson, Riley Patterson kick good	14	17
3	04:28	11	85	5:46	ISU	Allen Lazard 5-yard touchdown reception from Kyle Kempt, Garrett Owens kick good	21	17
3	02:16	6	49	2:12	MEM	30-yard field goal by Riley Patterson	21	20
"TOP" = time of possession. For other American football terms, see Glossary of American football.							21	20

=== Statistics ===
	1	2	3	4	Total
Cyclones	7	7	7	0	21
Tigers	7	3	10	0	20

Statistics	ISU	MEM
First downs	22	17
Plays–yards	80-346	59-339
Rushes–yards	42-32	26-53
Passing yards	314	286
Passing: Comp–Att–Int	24-38-0	21-33-0
Time of possession	37:49	22:11

Team	Category	Player	Statistics
ISU	Passing	Kyle Kempt	24/38, 314 yds
ISU	Rushing	David Montgomery	24 car, 52 yds
ISU	Receiving	Allen Lazard	10 rec, 142 yds, 1 TD
MEM	Passing	Riley Ferguson	21/33, 286 yds
MEM	Rushing	Patrick Taylor Jr.	17 car, 68 yds
MEM	Receiving	Phil Mayhue	5 rec, 85 yds, 1 TD
