= 2016 Iowa State Cyclones football team =

American college football season

2016 Iowa State Cyclones football
- Conference: Big 12 Conference
- Record: 3–9 (2–7 Big 12)
- Head coach: Matt Campbell (1st season)
- Offensive coordinator: Tom Manning (1st season)
- Offensive scheme: Pro spread
- Defensive coordinator: Jon Heacock (1st season)
- Base defense: 3–3–5
- MVP: Allen Lazard
- Home stadium: Jack Trice Stadium

2016 Big 12 Conference football standings
	Conf.			Overall
Team	W		L	W		L
No. 5 Oklahoma $	9	–	0	11	–	2
No. 11 Oklahoma State	7	–	2	10	–	3
No. 18 West Virginia	7	–	2	10	–	3
Kansas State	6	–	3	9	–	4
TCU	4	–	5	6	–	7
Baylor	3	–	6	7	–	6
Texas	3	–	6	5	–	7
Texas Tech	3	–	6	5	–	7
Iowa State	2	–	7	3	–	9
Kansas	1	–	8	2	–	10
$ – Conference champion; Rankings from AP Poll

The 2016 Iowa State Cyclones football team represented Iowa State University as a member of Big 12 Conference during the 2016 NCAA Division I FBS football season. Led by first-year head coach Matt Campbell, the Cyclones compiled an overall record of 3–9 with a mark of 2–7 in conference play, placing ninth in the Big 12. The team played home games at Jack Trice Stadium in Ames, Iowa.

== Schedule ==
Iowa State announced their 2016 football schedule on November 19, 2015. The 2016 schedule comprised seven home games and five away games.

Date	Time	Opponent	Site	TV	Result	Attendance
September 3	7:00 p.m.	No. 5 (FCS) Northern Iowa*	Jack Trice Stadium; Ames, IA	Cyclones.tv	L 20–25	60,629
September 10	6:30 p.m.	at No. 16 Iowa*	Kinnick Stadium; Iowa City, IA (rivalry)	BTN	L 3–42	70,585
September 17	11:00 a.m.	at TCU	Amon G. Carter Stadium; Fort Worth, TX	FS1	L 20–41	45,000
September 24	11:00 a.m.	San Jose State*	Jack Trice Stadium; Ames, IA	FSN	W 44–10	50,851
October 1	11:00 a.m.	No. 13 Baylor	Jack Trice Stadium; Ames, IA	FS1	L 42–45	50,842
October 8	2:30 p.m.	at Oklahoma State	Boone Pickens Stadium; Stillwater, OK	ESPNU	L 31–38	53,239
October 15	6:00 p.m.	at Texas	Darrel K. Royal - Texas Memorial Stadium; Austin, TX	LHN, Cyclones.tv	L 6–27	96,851
October 29	11:00 a.m.	Kansas State^{†}	Jack Trice Stadium; Ames, IA (rivalry)	FSN	L 26–31	52,763
November 3	6:30 p.m.	No. 12 Oklahoma	Jack Trice Stadium; Ames, IA	ESPN	L 24–34	50,662
November 12	11:00 a.m.	at Kansas	Memorial Stadium; Lawrence, KS	FSN	W 31–24	23,757
November 19	2:30 p.m.	Texas Tech	Jack Trice Stadium; Ames, IA	FS1	W 66–10	50,787
November 26	2:30 p.m.	No. 19 West Virginia	Jack Trice Stadium; Ames, IA	FS1	L 19–49	51,365
*Non-conference game; ^{†}Homecoming; Rankings from AP Poll released prior to the game; All times are in Central time

== Game summaries ==
=== Game 1: vs. Northern Iowa Panthers ===
Game One: Northern Iowa Panthers at Iowa State Cyclones – Game summary

Quarter	1	2	3	4	Total
Panthers	0	16	3	6	25
Cyclones	7	6	0	7	20

at Jack Trice Stadium, Ames, IA

- Date: September 3
- Game time: 7:06 p.m. CDT
- Game weather: Temperature: 71° • Wind: SE 5 • Weather: Partly Cloudy
- Game attendance: 60,629
- Referee: Referee: Brandon Cruse • Umpire: M. Fitzgerald • Linesman: B. Edwards • Line judge: Quentin Givens • Back judge: Daniel Young • Field judge: Rich Almeroth • Side judge: Tuta Salaam
- TV announcers (Cyclones.tv): Brent Blum (Play-by-play) & Sage Rosenfels (Color)

Game information

First quarter

- ISU - 07:16 Dondre Daley 39 yd pass from Joel Lanning, Cole Netten XP good (ISU 7–0)

Second quarter

- UNI - 09:14 Tyvis Smith 10 yd pass from Aaron Bailey, Austin Errthum XP good (Tie 7–7)
- ISU - 03:20 Hakeem Butler 18 yd pass from Joel Lanning, Cole Netten XP failed (ISU 13–7)
- UNI - 01:23 Karter Schult 11 yd safety (ISU 13–9)
- UNI - 00:00 Aaron Bailey 2 yd run Austin Errthum XP god (UNI 16–13)

Third quarter

- UNI - 04:20 Austin 22 yd field goal good (UNI 19–13)

Fourth quarter

- ISU - 07:02 Allen Lazard 33 yd pass from Joel Lanning, Cole Netten XP good (ISU 20–19)
- UNI - 02:49 J. Browning 1yd run good, 2 point conversion failed (UNI 25–20)

Top passers

- UNI – Aaron Bailey 15/27, 135 yards, 1 TD, 0 INT
- ISU – Joel Lanning 18/28, 256 yards, 3 TD, 2 INT

Top rushers

- UNI – Aaron Bailey 25 attempts, 114 yards, 1 TD
- ISU – Mike Warren 12 attempts, 30 yards

Top receivers

- UNI – Tyvis Smith 5 receptions, 43 yards, 1 TD
- ISU – Allen Lazard 6 receptions, 129 yards, 1 TD

Top tacklers

- UNI – Jared Farley 8 tackles, 1 INT
- ISU – Reggan Northrup 13 tackles, 1.0 Sack

=== Game 2: vs. Iowa Hawkeyes ===
Game Two: Iowa State Cyclones at Iowa Hawkeyes – Game summary

Quarter	1	2	3	4	Total
Cyclones	3	0	0	0	3
Hawkeyes	14	14	14	0	42

at Kinnick Stadium, Iowa City, IA

- Date: September 10
- Game time: 6:42 p.m. CDT
- Game weather: Temperature: 72° • Wind: NW 12 • Weather: Sunny
- Game attendance: 70,585
- Referee: Referee: Mike Defee • Umpire: Robert Richeson • Linesman: Al Green • Line judge: Derek Anderson • Back judge: Terry Jones • Field judge: Joe Bluebaugh • Side judge: Lo van Pham
- TV: BTN

Game information

First quarter

- IOWA - 08:42 George Kittle 9 yd pass from C.J. Beathart, Keith Duncan XP good (Iowa 7–0)
- IOWA - 05:42 Akrum Wadley 26 yd pass from C.J. Beathard, Keith Duncan XP good (Iowa 14–0)
- Iowa - 00:32 Cole Netten 31 yd field goal good (Iowa 14–3)

Second quarter

- IOWA - 10:15 Matt VandeBerg 12 yd pass from C.J. Beathard, Keith Duncan XP good (Iowa 21–3)
- IOWA - 02:17 C.J. Beathard 1 yd run, Keith Duncan XP good (Iowa 28–3)

Third quarter

- IOWA - 03:18 Akrum Wadley 3 yd run Keith Duncan XP good (Iowa 35–3)
- IOWA - 01:33 LeShun Daniels 43 yd run, Keith Duncan XP good (Iowa 42–3)

Top passers

- IOWA – C. J. Beathard 19/28, 235 yards, 3 TD
- ISU – Joel Lanning 8/20, 86 yards, 1 INT

Top rushers

- IOWA – LeShun Daniels 15 attempts, 112 yards, 1 TD
- ISU – Kene Nwangu 7 attempts, 31 yards

Top receivers

- IOWA – Matt VandeBerg 7 receptions, 129 yards, 1 TD
- ISU – Allen Lazard 7 receptions, 111 yards

Top tacklers

- IOWA – Josey Jewell 9 tackles
- ISU – Brian Peavy 7 tackles

=== Game 3: at TCU Horned Frogs ===
Game Three: Iowa State Cyclones at TCU Horned Frogs – Game summary

Quarter	1	2	3	4	Total
Cyclones	0	7	3	10	20
Horned Frogs	10	14	14	3	41

at Amon G. Carter Stadium, Fort Worth, TX

- Date: September 17
- Game time: 11:05 a.m. CDT
- Game weather: Temperature: 85° • Wind: N 6 • Weather: Sunny and Clear
- Game attendance: 45,119
- Referee: Referee: Cooper Castleberry • Umpire: Jim Adams • Linesman: Cal McNeill • Line judge: Kelly Deterding • Back judge: Donnie Aultman • Field judge: Scott Gaines • Side judge: Anthony Fleming
- TV: FS1

Game information

First quarter

- TCU - 11:48 Ryan Graf 37 yd field goal good (TCU 3–0)
- TCU - 05:32 Kyle Hicks 64 yd run, Ryan Graf XP good (TCU 10–0)

Second quarter

- ISU - 12:18 Joel Lanning 8 yd run, Cole Netten XP good (TCU 10–7)
- TCU - 07:22 Kenny Hill 1 yd run, Ryan Graf XP good (TCU 17–7)
- TCU - 00:48 Derric Green 1 yd run, Ryan Graf XP good (TCU 24–7)

Third quarter

- TCU - 11:55 Kyle Hicks 25 yd pass from Kenny Hill, Ryan Graf XP good (TCU 31–7)
- ISU - 07:51 Cole Netten 25 yd field goal good (TCU 31–10)
- TCU - 01:08 T. Johnson 2 yd run, Ryan Graf XP good (TCU 38–10)

Fourth quarter

- TCU - 10:37 B. Hatfield 37 yd field goal good (TCU 41–10)
- ISU - 06:41 Joel Lanning 1 yd run, Cole Netten XP good (TCU 41–17)
- ISU - 01:29 Cole Netten 30 yd field goal good (TCU 41–20)

Top passers

- ISU – Joel Lanning 12/21, 127 yards
- TCU – Kenny Hill 19/30, 219 yards, 1 TD

Top rushers

- ISU – Mike Warren 23 attempts, 95 yards
- TCU – Kyle Hicks 12 attempts, 117 yards, 1 TD

Top receivers

- ISU –Trever Ryen 6 receptions, 58 yards
- TCU – John Diarse 7 receptions, 97 yards

Top tacklers

- ISU – Mike Johnson 9 tackles
- TCU – Ty Summers 16 tackles

=== Game 4: vs. San Jose State Spartans ===
Game Four: San Jose State Spartans at Iowa State Cyclones – Game summary

Quarter	1	2	3	4	Total
Spartans	3	0	7	0	10
Cyclones	10	13	7	14	44

at Jack Trice Stadium, Ames, IA

- Date: September 24
- Game time: 11:05 a.m. CDT
- Game weather: Temperature: 74° • Wind: SE 10–15 • Weather: Mostly Sunny, Haze
- Game attendance: 50,851
- Referee: Referee: Kevin Mar • Umpire: Matt Salas • Linesman: John Braun • Line judge: Darren Deckard • Back judge: Dave Baldwin • Field judge: Kirk Wisnewski • Side judge: Mario Seneca
- TV: FSN

Game information

First quarter

- ISU – 10:40 Allen Lazard 17 yd pass from Joel Lanning, Cole Netten XP good (ISU 7–0)
- SJS - 03:24 Bryce Crawford 22 yd field goal good (ISU 7–3)
- ISU - 00:53 Cole Netten 49 field goal good (ISU 10–3)

Second quarter

- ISU – 09:32 Mike Warren 2 yd run, Cole Netten XP good (ISU 17–3)
- ISU – 01:47 Dondre Daley 23 yd pass from Jacob Park, Cole Netten XP good (ISU 23–3)

Third quarter

- ISU – 11:35 D. Jones 49 yd pass from Joel Lanning, Cole Netten XP good (ISU 30–3)
- SJS - 08:19 Tim Crawley 15 yd pass from Josh Love, Bryce Crawford XP good (ISU 30–10)

Fourth quarter

- ISU – 12:51 D. Jones 1 yd pass from Jacob Park, Cole Netten XP good (ISU 37–10)
- ISU - 07:45 Trever Ryen 16 yd pass from Jacob Park, Cole Netten XP good (ISU 44–10)

Top passers

- SJS – Josh Love 13/27, 155 yards, 1 TD, 4 INT
- ISU – Jacob Park 15/19, 165 yards, 3 TD

Top rushers

- SJS – Zamore Zigler 24 attempts, 104 yards
- ISU – Mike Warren 19 attempts, 103 yards, 1 TD

Top receivers

- SJS – Justin Holmes 3 receptions, 48 yards
- ISU – Deshaunte Jones 3 receptions, 78 yards, 2 TD

Top tacklers

- SJS – Frank Ginda 6 tackles
- ISU – Kamari Cotton-Moya 11 tackles, 1 INT

=== Game 5: vs. Baylor Bears ===
Game Five: Baylor Bears at Iowa State Cyclones – Game summary

Quarter	1	2	3	4	Total
Bears	7	14	7	17	45
Cyclones	14	14	14	0	42

at Jack Trice Stadium, Ames, IA

- Date: October 1
- Game time: 11:06 a.m. CDT
- Game weather: Temperature: 61° • Wind: N 0-5 • Weather: Overcast
- Game attendance: 50,842
- Referee: Referee: Dan Romeo • Umpire: Jim Adams • Linesman: Andy Warner • Line judge: Marc Bovos • Back judge: Chris Alston • Field judge: Ed Vinzant • Side judge: Jim Murphy
- TV: FS1

Game information

First quarter

- ISU - 09:36 D. Jones 43 yd pass from Joel Lanning, Cole Netten XP good (ISU 7–0)
- ISU - 03:06 Mike Warren 1 yd run, Cole Netten XP good (ISU 14–0)
- BU - 01:12 T. Williams 7 yd run, Chris Callahan XP good (ISU 14–7)

Second quarter

- ISU - 11:40 David Montgomery 9 yd run, Cole Netten XP good (ISU 21–7)
- BU - 10:28 Shock Linwood 2 yd run, Chris Callahan XP good (ISU 21–14)
- ISU - 02:48 Joel Lanning 3 yd run, Cole Netten XP good (ISU 28–14)
- BU - 00:53 Seth Russell 3 yd run, Chris Callahan XP good (ISU 28–21)

Third quarter

- ISU - 09:44 Mike Warren 4 yd run, Cole Netten XP good (ISU 35–21)
- BU - 06:48 Chris Platt 5 yd pass from Seth Russell, Chris Callahan XP good (ISU 35–28)
- ISU - 04:31 Carson Epps 46 yd pass from Joel Lanning, Cole Netten XP good (ISU 42–28)

Fourth quarter

- BU - 11:40 Seth Russell 1 yd run, Chris Callahan XP good (ISU 42–35)
- BU - 06:27 T. Williams 2 yd run, Chris Callahan XP good (Tie 42–42)
- BU - 00:00 Chris Callahan 19 yd field goal good (BU 45–42)

Top passers

- ISU – Joel Lanning 17/23, 261 yards, 2 TD
- BU – Seth Russell 12/22, 178 yards, 1 TD

Top rushers

- ISU – Mike Warren 30 attempts, 130 yards, 2 TD
- BU – Shock Linwood 25 attempts, 237 yards, 1 TD

Top receivers

- ISU – Deshaunte Jones 4 receptions, 62 yards, 1 TD
- BU – Blake Lynch 3 receptions, 80 yards

Top tacklers

- ISU – Willie Harvey 12 tackles, 1.0 sack
- BU – Taylor Young 17 tackles

=== Game 6: at Oklahoma State Cowboys ===
Game Six: Iowa State Cyclones at Oklahoma State Cowboys – Game summary

Quarter	1	2	3	4	Total
Cyclones	3	14	14	0	31
Cowboys	7	7	7	17	38

at Boone Pickens Stadium, Stillwater, OK

- Date: October 8
- Game time: 2:32 p.m. CDT
- Game weather: Temperature: 70° • Wind: SE 5 • Weather: Sunny and Clear
- Game attendance: 53,239
- Referee: Referee: Brandon Cruse • Umpire: M. Fitzgerald • Linesman: B. Edwards • Line judge: Quentin Givens • Back judge: Daniel Young • Field judge: Rich Almeroth • Side judge: Tuta Salaam
- TV: ESPNU

Game information

First quarter

- ISU – 05:53 Cole Netten 35 yd field goal (ISU 3–0)
- OSU - 04:13 Jhajuan Seales 33 yd pass from Mason Rudolph, Ben Grogan XP good (OSU 7–3)

Second quarter

- ISU – 12:59 Allen Lazard 3 yd pass from Joel Lanning, Cole Netten XP good (ISU 10–7)
- OSU - Justice Hill 5 yd run, Ben Grogan XP good (OSU 14–10)
- ISU – 02:58 David Montgomery 1 yd run, Cole Netten XP good (ISU 17–14)

Third quarter

- ISU - 12:13 Trever Ryen 35 yd pass from Joel Lanning, Cole Netten XP good (ISU 24–14)
- ISU - 05:55 Allen Lazard 18 yd pass from Joel Lanning, Cole Netten XP good (ISU 31–14)
- OSU - 02:24 James Washington 35 yd pass from Mason Rudolph, Ben Grogan XP good (ISU 31–21)

Fourth quarter

- OSU - 14:51 Jalen McCleskey 3 yd pass from Mason Rudolph, Ben Grogan XP good (ISU 31–28)
- OSU - 11:33 Ben Grogan 30 yd field goal good (Tie 31–31)
- OSU - 03:40 James Washington pass from Mason Rudolph, Ben Grogan XP good (OSU 38–31)

Top passers

- OSU – Mason Rudolph 26/44, 351 yards, 4 TD
- ISU – Joel Lanning 19/32, 190 yards, 2 TD

Top rushers

- OSU – Justice Hill 18 attempts, 57 yards, 1 TD
- ISU – Joel Lanning 18 attempts, 67 yards

Top receivers

- OSU – James Washington 8 receptions, 152 yards, 2 TD
- ISU – Trever Ryen 6 receptions, 74 yards, 1 TD

Top tacklers

- OSU – D. Averette 9 tackles
- ISU – Willie Harvey 8 tackles

=== Game 7: vs. Texas Longhorns ===
Game Seven: Iowa State Cyclones at Texas Longhorns – Game summary

Quarter	1	2	3	4	Total
Cyclones	6	0	0	0	6
Longhorns	0	3	21	3	27

at Darrell K Royal–Texas Memorial Stadium, Austin, TX

- Date: October 15
- Game time: 06:05 p.m. CDT
- Game weather: Temperature: 68° • Wind: S 6 • Weather: Partly Cloudy
- Game attendance: 96,851
- Referee: Referee: Scott Campbell • Umpire: Joe Bellinger • Linesman: Doug Moore • Line judge: Keith Garmond • Back judge: Joel Wetzel • Field judge: Randy Smith • Side judge: Corey Luxner
- TV: LHN/Cyclones.tv

Game information

First quarter

- ISU - 03:59 Cole Netten 39 yd field goal good (ISU 3–0)
- ISU - 00:35 Cole Netten 25 yd field goal good (ISU 6–0)

Second quarter

- UT - 00:15 Trent Domingue 21 yd field goal good (ISU 6–3)

Third quarter

- UT - 12:53 Jerrod Heard 37 yd pass from Shane Buechele, Trent Domingue XP good (UT 10–6)
- UT - 07:13 Devin Duvernay 75 yd pass from Shane Buchele, Trent Domingue XP good (UT 17–6)
- UT - 00:53 D'Onta Foreman 18 yd run, Trent Domingue XP good (UT 24–6)

Fourth quarter

- UT - 04:54 Trent Domingue 29 yd field goal good (UT 27–6)

Top passers

- ISU – Joel Lanning 12/22, 140 yards
- UT – Shane Buchele 26/28, 296 yards, 2 TD, 1 INT

Top rushers

- ISU – Mike Warren 18 attempts, 60 yards
- UT – D'Onta Foreman 30 attempts, 136 yards, 1 TD

Top receivers

- ISU – Deshaunte Jones 5 receptions, 87 yards
- UT – Devin Duvernay 4 receptions, 96 yards, 1 TD

Top tacklers

- ISU – Kane Seeley 11 tackles, 1 INT
- UT – Chris Nelson 7 tackles, 1.5 Sacks

=== Game 8: vs. Kansas State Wildcats ===
Game Eight: Kansas State Wildcats at Iowa State Cyclones – Game summary

Quarter	1	2	3	4	Total
Kansas State	3	14	14	0	31
Cyclones	3	0	7	16	26

at Jack Trice Stadium, Ames, IA

- Date: October 29
- Game time: 11:05 a.m. CDT
- Game weather: Temperature: 62° • Wind: E 0–5 • Weather: Mostly Sunny
- Game attendance: 52,763
- Referee: Referee: Reggie Smith • Umpire: Tab Slaughter • Linesman: Mike Moeller • Line judge: Mark Stewart • Back judge: Lyndon Nixon • Field judge: Matt Mills • Side judge: Tim Murray
- TV: FSN

Game information

First quarter

- KSU - 10:12 M. McCrane 23 yd field goal good KSU 3–0)
- ISU – 05:23 Cole Netten 24 yd field goal good (Tie 3–3)

Second quarter

- KSU - 14:24 Deante Burton 11 yd pass from Jesse Ertz, M. McCrane XP good (KSU 10–3)
- KSU - 08:03 Justin Silmon 3 yd run, M. McCrane XP good (17–3)

Third quarter

- ISU - D. Jones 24 yd pass form Jacob Park, Cole Netten XP good (KSU 17–10)
- KSU - 05:24 Winston Dimel 1 yd run, M. McCrane XP good (KSU 24–10)
- KSU - 00:27 Alex Barnes 8 yd run, M. McCrane XP good (KSU 31–10)

Fourth quarter

- ISU - 13:15 Joel Lanning 5 yd run, Cole Netten XP good (KSU 31–17)
- ISU - 06:55 Kane Seeley 1 yd safety (KSU 31–19)
- ISU - 00:51 D. Jones 5 yd pass from Jacob Park, Cole Netten XP good (KSU 31–26)

Top passers

- KSU – Jesse Ertz 18/28, 151 yards, 1 TD
- ISU – Jacob Park 19/35, 301 yards, 2 TD, 1 INT

Top rushers

- KSU – Jesse Ertz 9 attempts, 106 yards
- ISU – Joel Lanning 10 attempts, 74 yards, 1 TD

Top receivers

- KSU – Deante Burton 5 receptions, 72 yards, 1 TD
- ISU – Allen Lazard 8 receptions, 134 yards

Top tacklers

- KSU – D.J. Reed 14 tackles
- ISU – Kamari Cotton-Moya 9 tackles

=== Game 9: vs. Oklahoma Sooners ===
Game Nine: Oklahoma Sooners at Iowa State Cyclones – Game summary

Quarter	1	2	3	4	Total
Sooners	14	14	3	3	34
Cyclones	3	14	0	7	24

at Jack Trice Stadium, Ames, IA

- Date: November 3
- Game time: 6:33 p.m. CST
- Game weather: Temperature: 65° • Wind: NW 0-5 • Weather: Clear Skies
- Game attendance: 50,662
- Referee: Referee: Dan Romeo • Umpire: Scott Teifer • Linesman: Andy Warner • Line judge: Marc Bovos • Back judge: Chris Alston • Field judge: Ed Vinzant • Side judge: Jim Murphy
- TV: ESPN

Game information

First Quarter

- OU – 12:31 Mark Andrews 6 yd pass from Baker Mayfield, Austin Seibert XP good (OU 7–0)
- ISU - 04:22 Cole Netten 28 yd field goal good (OU 7-3)

Second Quarter

- OU – 01:22 Jeffery Mead 30 yd pass from Baker Mayfield, Austin Seibert XP good (OU 14–3)
- ISU 11:15 Allen Lazard 31 yd pass from Jacob Park, Cole Netten XP good (OU 14–10)
- ISU 04:30 Joel Lanning 41 yd run, Cole Netten XP good (ISU 17–14)
- OU - 04:16 Dede Westbrook 65 yd pass from Baker Mayfield, Austin Seibert XP good (OU 21–17)
- OU - 00:06 D. Flowers 11 yd pass from Baker Mayfield, Austin Seibert XP good (OU 28–17)

Third quarter

- OU - 05:50 Austin Seibert 36 yd field goal good (OU 31–17)

Fourth Quarter

- ISU - 13:04 Dondre Daley 23 yd pass from Jacob Park, Cole Netten XP good (OU 31–24)
- OU 07:50 Austin Seibert 35 yd field goal good (OU 34–24)

Top Passers

- ISU – Jacob Park 16/29, 160 yards, 2 TD
- OU – Baker Mayfield 25/34, 328 yards, 4 TD, 1 INT

Top Rushers

- ISU – Joel Lanning 7 attempts, 61 yards, 1 TD
- OU – Dimitri Flowers 22 attempts, 115 yards

Top Receiving

- ISU – Allen Lazard 6 receptions, 76 yards, 1 TD
- OU – Dede Westbrook 3 receptions, 39 yards, 1 TD

Top Tacklers

- ISU – Willie Harvey 9 tackles, 1.0 Sack
- OU – DJ Ward 7 tackles

=== Game 10: at Kansas Jayhawks ===
Game Ten: Iowa State Cyclones at Kansas Jayhawks – Game summary

Quarter	1	2	3	4	Total
Cyclones	3	7	12	9	31
Jayhawks	7	7	10	0	24

at Memorial Stadium, Lawrence, KS

- Date: November 12
- Game time: 11:05 a.m. CST
- Game weather: Temperature: 48° • Wind: SE 5 • Weather: Clear
- Game attendance: 23,757
- Referee: Referee: Brad Van Vark • Umpire: Michael Cooper • Linesman: George Gusman • Line judge: Franc LeBlanc • Back judge: Brian Ernest • Field judge: Jason Ledet • Side judge: Gene Semko
- TV: FSN

Game information

First quarter

- ISU – 12:14 Cole Netten 23 yd field goal good (ISU 3–0)
- KU - 05:24 Steven Sims 7 yd pass from Carter Stanley, Matthew Wyman XP good (KU 3–7)

Second quarter

- KU - 14:57 Taylor Martin 1 yd run, Matthew Wyman XP good (KU 14–3)
- ISU - 03:35 Allen Lazard 4 yd pass from Jacob Park, Cole Netten XP good (KU 14–10)

Third quarter

- KU - 10:35 Matthew Wyman 37 yd field goal good (KU 17–10)
- ISU - 06:52 D. Jones 12 yd pass from Jacob Park, Cole Netten kick failed (KU 17–16)
- KU - 04:58 Ke'aun Kinner 39 yd run, Matthew Wyman XP good (KU 24–16)
- ISU - 00:10 Mitch Harger 6 yd run, two point conversion failed (KU 24–22)

Fourth quarter

- ISU - 12:03 Joel Lanning 1 yd run, two point conversion failed (ISU 28–24)
- ISU - 02:48 Cole Netten 37 yd field goal good (ISU 31–24)

Top passers

- KU – Carter Stanley 26/38, 171 yards, 1 TD, 1 INT
- ISU – Jacob Park 20/26, 205 yards, 2 TD, 1 INT

Top rushers

- KU – Ke'aun Kinner 18 attempts, 152 yards, 1 TD
- ISU – David Montgomery 24 attempts, 169 yards

Top receivers

- KU – Shakiem Barbel 6 receptions, 60 yards
- ISU – Allen Lazard 10 receptions, 120 yards, 1 TD

Top tacklers

- KU – Mike Lee 12 tackles
- ISU – Kane Seeley 10 tackles

=== Game 11: vs. Texas Tech Red Raiders ===
Game Nine: Texas Tech Red Raiders at Iowa State Cyclones – Game summary

Quarter	1	2	3	4	Total
Red Raiders	3	0	7	0	10
Cyclones	14	31	7	14	66

at Jack Trice Stadium, Ames, IA

- Date: November 19
- Game time: 2:35 p.m. CST
- Game weather: Temperature: 38° • Wind: NW 15 • Weather: Clear
- Game attendance: 50,787
- Referee: Referee: Eddy Shelton • Umpire: Rick Podraza • Linesman: Rick Smith • Line judge: Scott Reilly • Back judge: Terry White • Field judge: Nick Lave • Side judge: Richard Corona
- TV: FS1

Game information

First Quarter

- ISU - 11:17 Joel Lanning 24 yd run, Cole Netten XP good (ISU 7–0)
- TTU - 06:17 C. Hatfield 31 yd field goal good (ISU 7–3)
- ISU - 02:21 Jacob Park 2 yd run, Cole Netten XP good (ISU 14–3)

Second quarter

- ISU - 14:52 Allen Lazard 34 yd pass from Jacob Park, Cole Netten XP good (ISU 21–3)
- ISU - 12:27 Joel Lanning 5 yd run, Cole Netten XP good (ISU 28–3)
- ISU - 07:47 Hakeem Butler 39 yd pass from Jacob Park, Cole Netten XP good (ISU 35–3)
- ISU - 06:50 Kamari Cotton-Moya 48 yd interception return, Cole Netten XP good (ISU 42–3)
- ISU - 00:00 Cole Netten 27 yd field goal good (ISU 45–3)

Third quarter

- TTU - 07:17 Keke Coutee 11 yd pass from Patrick Mahomes, C. Hatfield XP good (ISU 45–10)
- ISU - 04:13 Joel Lanning 19 yd run, Cole Netten XP good (ISU 52–10)

Fourth quarter

- ISU - 14:19 Joel Lanning 35 yd run, Cole Netten XP good (ISU 59–10)
- ISU - 08:39 Joel Lanning 10 yd run, Cole Netten XP good (ISU 66–10)

Top Passers

- ISU – Jacob Park 14/18, 285 yards, 2 TD
- TTU – Patrick Mahomes 28/36, 219 yards, 1 TD, 2 INT

Top Rushers

- ISU – Joel Lanning 17 attempts, 171 yards, 5 TD
- TTU – Da'Leon Ward 25 attempts, 97 yards

Top Receiving

- ISU – Allen Lazard 7 receptions, 137 yards, 1 TD
- TTU – Keke Coutee 8 receptions, 115 yards, 1 TD

Top Tacklers

- ISU – Willie Harvey 8 tackles, 1.0 Sack
- TTU – Luke Stice 12 tackles

=== Game 12: vs. West Virginia Mountaineers ===
Game Nine: West Virginia Mountaineers at Iowa State Cyclones – Game summary

Quarter	1	2	3	4	Total
Mountaineers	14	7	14	14	49
Cyclones	13	3	3	0	19

at Jack Trice Stadium, Ames, IA

- Date: November 26
- Game time: 2:36 p.m. CST
- Game weather: Temperature: 55° • Wind: SW 15-20 • Weather: Mostly Sunny
- Game attendance: 51,363
- Referee: Referee: Brandon Cruse • Umpire: M. Fitzgerald • Linesman: B. Edwards • Line judge: Quentin Givens • Back judge: Daniel Young • Field judge: Scott Gaines • Side judge: Tuta Salaam
- TV: FS1

Game information

First Quarter

- ISU - 11:18 Cole Netten 40 yd field goal good (ISU 3–0)
- WVU - 09:01 Ka'Raun White 34 yd pass from Skyler Howard, Mike Molina XP good (WVU 7–3)
- WVU - 05:10 Kennedy McKoy 3 yd run, Mike Molina XP good (WVU 14–3)
- ISU - 04:56 Kene Nwangwu 97 yd kickoff return, Cole Netten XP good (WVU 14–10)
- ISU - 00:43 Cole Netten 28 yd field goal good (WVU 14–13)

Second quarter

- WVU - 09:47 Marcus Simms 48 yd pass from Skyler Howard, Mike Molina XP good (WVU 21–13)
- ISU - 06:12 Cole Netten 32 yd field goal good (WVU 21–16)

Third quarter

- WVU - 12:06 Shelton Gibson 71 yd pass from Skyler Howard, Mike Molina XP good (WVU 28–16)
- ISU - 08:50 Cole Netten 31 yd field goal good (WVU 28–19)
- WVU - 02:32 M. Pettaway 4 yd run, Mike Molina XP good (WVU 35–19)

Fourth quarter

- WVU - 13:37 Shelton Gibson 40 yd pass from Skyler Howard, Mike Molina XP good (WVU 42–19)
- WVU - 10:23 Trevon Wesco 6yd pass from Skyler Howard, Mike Molina XP good (WVU 49–19)

Top Passers

- ISU – Jacob Park 23/44, 371 yards, 1 INT
- WVU – Skyler Howard 12/21, 330 yards, 5 TD

Top Rushers

- ISU – David Montgomery 21 attempts, 141 yards
- WVU – Martell Pettaway 30 attempts, 181 yards, 1 TD

Top Receiving

- ISU – Allen Lazard 4 receptions, 103 yards
- WVU – Shelton Gibson 3 receptions, 161 yards, 2 TD

Top Tacklers

- ISU – Kane Seeley 11 tackles
- WVU – Rasul Douglas 9 tackles, 1 INT

== Personnel ==
=== Coaching staff ===
Name	Position	Alma Mater	Consecutive season at Iowa State in current position
Matt Campbell	Head coach	Mount Union, 2002	1st
Jon Heacock	Defensive coordinator, Safeties	Muskingum, 1983	1st
Tom Manning	Offensive coordinator, Offensive line	Mount Union, 2002	1st
Louis Ayeni	Associate head coach, Running game coordinator	Northwestern, 2003	3rd
Brian Gasser	Wide receivers, Special Teams	Ohio Northern, 2006	1st
Alex Golesh	Tight Ends, Recruiting Coordinator	Ohio State, 2006	1st
Joel Gordon	Offensive analyst	Shepherd, 2003	1st
Jim Hofher	Passing game coordinator	Cornell, 1979	1st
D.K. McDonald	Cornerbacks	Edinboro, 2001	1st
Eli Rasheed	Defensive line	Indiana, 1996	1st
Tyson Veidt	Assistant head coach, Linebackers	Muskingum, 1996	1st
Rudy Wade	Strength and Conditioning	Ball State, 2001	1st

== Awards and honors ==
All-Big 12
Player	Selection
Allen Lazard	First Team (Offense)
Cole Netten	First Team (special teams)
Nick Fett	Second Team Team (Offense)
Demond Tucker	Second Team (Defense)
Jhaustin Thomas	Second Team (Defense)
Kamari Cotton-Moya	Second Team (Defense)
Patrick Scoggins	Honorable Mention (Offense)
Willie Harvey Jr.	Honorable Mention (Defense)
Brian Peavy	Honorable Mention (Defense)
Jomal Wiltz	Honorable Mention (Defense)
Kene Nwangwu	Honorable Mention (special teams)

Weekly awards
Player	Award	Date Awarded
David Montgomery	Big 12 Newcomer of the Week	November 14, 2016
Kamari Cotton-Moya	Big 12 Co-defensive Player of the Week	November 21, 2016

Individual awards
Player	Award
Allen Lazard	Pete Taylor Most Valuable Player
