= Jon Heacock =

American football player and coach (born 1960)

Biographical details
- Born: October 11, 1960 (age 66); Beloit, Ohio, U.S.

Playing career
- 1982: Muskingum

Coaching career (HC unless noted)
- 1983: Toledo (GA)
- 1984: Steubenville HS (OH) (assistant)
- 1985–1987: West Liberty (DC/DL/DB)
- 1988–1989: Michigan (GA)
- 1990: Army (assistant)
- 1991: Youngstown State (DB)
- 1992–1996: Youngstown State (DC/DB)
- 1997–1999: Indiana (DC)
- 2000: Youngstown State (DC)
- 2001–2009: Youngstown State
- 2010–2012: Kent State (DC/CB)
- 2013: Purdue (DB)
- 2014–2015: Toledo (AHC/DC/S)
- 2016–2025: Iowa State (DC)

Head coaching record
- Overall: 60–44

Accomplishments and honors

Championships
- 2 Gateway (2005–2006)

Jon Heacock (born October 11, 1960) is a former American college football coach and player. Heacock had 43 years of coaching experience, serving as a head coach at Youngstown State (2001–09) and defensive coordinator stints at Youngstown State (1992–96, 2000), Indiana (1997–99), Kent State (2011–12) and Toledo (2014–15). As the head football coach at Youngstown State University from 2001 to 2009, Heacock compiled a record of 60–44. As an assistant coach at Youngstown State he served under Jim Tressel.

== Playing career ==
A native of Beloit, Ohio, Heacock graduated from West Branch High School in 1979 and earned a bachelor's degree in health and physical education from Muskingum College in 1983. He participated in both football and track and field at Muskingum.

== Coaching career ==
=== Assistant coach ===
After graduating from Muskingum in 1983, Heacock accepted a position as a graduate assistant defensive line coach at the University of Toledo. In 1984, he served on the football coaching staff at Steubenville High School, where he helped the team to an Ohio Division II State Championship. Heacock then served as the defensive coordinator, defensive line coach, and secondary coach at West Liberty University from 1985 to 1987. The next two seasons, he was a graduate assistant on Bo Schembechler's staff at the University of Michigan, where he worked with both the defensive backs and special teams during a stretch in which Michigan won two Big Ten Conference titles and the 1989 Rose Bowl. Heacock then moved on as an assistant coach at the United States Military Academy before joining the coaching staff at Youngstown State in 1991.

In his first year at Youngstown State, Heacock served as defensive backs coach as the Penguins finished 12–3 and won the Division I-AA national championship. During the next five seasons (1992–1996) he was promoted and served as the defensive coordinator. Youngstown State advanced to the I-AA title game for four consecutive years, winning in 1991 over Marshall, losing to Marshall in 1992, rebounding with a victory over Marshall 1993, and beating Boise State in 1994. Youngstown State finished 3–8 in 1995 and 8–3 in 1996, bringing the Penguins' record to 61–19–2 during Heacock's six-year stint as an assistant. Heacock left YSU for a period of three years to serve as the defensive coordinator and defensive backs coach at Indiana University. He returned to Youngstown State in 2000 as the defensive coordinator. His defense was ranked 15th in the nation in scoring allowed and the Penguins finished 9–3.

In 2013, Heacock left Kent State to take the Safeties Coach position at Purdue, following Darrell Hazell. In 2014, Heacock returned to the MAC when he was named the defensive coordinator for Toledo.

In January 2016, when Matt Campbell became head coach at Iowa State, Heacock followed him to serve in the same position as defensive coordinator and safeties coach. Heacock initially ran a 4–3 or 4–2–5 defense in 2016. However, Iowa State would later become known for its 3–3–5 defense that debuted in Iowa State's game against Texas in 2017. The 2017 Iowa State team would later upset 3rd-ranked Oklahoma and 4th-ranked TCU, ending the season leading the Big 12 in tackles for loss. Heacock was a finalist for the Broyles Award at the season's end. In 2022, the Iowa State defense led the conference in total defense, scoring defense, passing defense, and rushing defense. Heacock was named a nominee for the Broyles Award in 2022 as well as in 2024. On December 5, 2025, Campbell left Iowa State to become the head coach at Penn State, with Washington State head coach Jimmy Rogers being named Campell's replacement at Iowa State, with Rogers naming Jesse Bobbit as the Cyclones' new defensive coordinator. On December 23, Heacock announced that he would not be following Campbell to Penn State and instead would be retiring.

=== Head coach ===
Heacock was named Youngstown State's fifth head football coach on January 25, 2001 when Jim Tressel left to coach at Ohio State University. The Penguins finished 8–3 in 2005, with a 5–2 record in conference that earned the program its first-ever Gateway Conference title, in a tie with Northern Iowa University and Southern Illinois University. In 2006, the Penguins went 6–1 in the Gateway Conference to win the league title outright. For the seventh time in school history, the Penguins advanced to the NCAA semifinals, defeating foes James Madison University and Illinois State University before falling to top-ranked Appalachian State University. They finished with an 11–3 overall record. Heacock was named the Gateway's Bruce Craddock Coach of the Year in 2005 and 2006. He was also named the American Football Coaches Association's Division I-AA Region Four Coach of the Year in both seasons and was a finalist for the Eddie Robinson Award. On November 22, 2009, Heacock announced his resignation as head coach at Youngstown State.

== Head coaching record ==
Year	Team	Overall	Conference	Standing	Bowl/playoffs	Sports Network^{#}	USA/ESPN^{°}
Youngstown State Penguins (Gateway/Missouri Valley Football Conference) (2001–2009)
2001	Youngstown State	8–3	5–2	T–2nd		15	16
2002	Youngstown State	7–4	4–3	T–3rd			
2003	Youngstown State	5–7	2–5	6th			
2004	Youngstown State	4–7	2–5	T–5th			
2005	Youngstown State	8–3	5–2	T–1st		14	14
2006	Youngstown State	11–3	6–1	1st	L NCAA Division I Semifinal	4	
2007	Youngstown State	7–4	3–3	T–3rd		16	
2008	Youngstown State	4–8	3–5	T–6th			
2009	Youngstown State	6–5	4–4	T–5th			
Youngstown State:		60–44	34–30				
Total:		60–44					
National championship Conference title Conference division title or championship game berth
