= 2017 Memphis Tigers football team =

American college football season

2017 Memphis Tigers football

AAC West Division champion

The American Championship, L 55–62 ^{2OT} vs. UCF

Liberty Bowl, L 20–21 vs. Iowa State
- Conference: American Athletic Conference
- West Division

Ranking
- Coaches: No. 24
- AP: No. 25
- Record: 10–3 (7–1 American)
- Head coach: Mike Norvell (2nd season)
- Offensive coordinator: Darrell Dickey (6th season)
- Offensive scheme: Pro spread
- Defensive coordinator: Chris Ball (2nd season)
- Base defense: Multiple
- Home stadium: Liberty Bowl Memorial Stadium

2017 American Athletic Conference football standings
	Conf.			Overall
Team	W		L	W		L
East Division
No. 6 UCF xy$	8	–	0	13	–	0
No. 21 South Florida	6	–	2	10	–	2
Temple	4	–	4	7	–	6
Cincinnati	2	–	6	4	–	8
UConn	2	–	6	3	–	9
East Carolina	2	–	6	3	–	9
West Division
No. 25 Memphis xy	7	–	1	10	–	3
Houston	5	–	3	7	–	5
Navy	4	–	4	7	–	6
SMU	4	–	4	7	–	6
Tulane	3	–	5	5	–	7
Tulsa	1	–	7	2	–	10
Championship: UCF 62, Memphis 55
$ – Conference champion; x – Division champion/co-champions; y – Championship game participant; As of January 9, 2018; Rankings from AP Poll.

The 2017 Memphis Tigers football team represented the University of Memphis in the 2017 NCAA Division I FBS football season. The Tigers played their home games at the Liberty Bowl Memorial Stadium in Memphis, Tennessee and competed in the West Division of the American Athletic Conference. They were led by second-year head coach Mike Norvell. They finished the season 10–3, 7–1 in AAC play to be champions of the West Division. They represented the West Division in The American Championship Game where they lost to East Division champions UCF. They were invited to the Liberty Bowl where they lost to Iowa State.

== Preseason ==
In the preseason AAC media poll, the Tigers were picked to finish first in the West Division of the AAC, receiving 22 of 30 first place votes.

== Schedule ==
Memphis announced its 2017 football schedule on February 9, 2017. The 2017 schedule consists of 7 home and 5 away games in the regular season. The Tigers hosted AAC foes East Carolina, Navy, SMU, and Tulane, and traveled to UConn, Houston, Tulsa, and UCF.

The Tigers hosted three of the four non-conference opponents, Louisiana-Monroe from the Sun Belt Conference, Southern Illinois from the Missouri Valley Football Conference and UCLA from the Pac-12 Conference. Memphis was supposed travel to Georgia State from the Sun Belt Conference before Hurricane Irma caused their conference opener at UCF to be rescheduled over the Georgia State game.

Date	Time	Opponent	Rank	Site	TV	Result	Attendance
August 31	8:00 p.m.	Louisiana–Monroe*		Liberty Bowl Memorial Stadium; Memphis, TN	CBSSN	W 37–29	10,263
September 16	11:00 a.m.	No. 25 UCLA*		Liberty Bowl Memorial Stadium; Memphis, TN	ABC	W 48–45	46,291
September 23	7:00 p.m.	Southern Illinois*^{†}		Liberty Bowl Memorial Stadium; Memphis, TN	WMC	W 44–31	41,584
September 30	6:00 p.m.	at UCF		Spectrum Stadium; Orlando, FL	ESPN2	L 13–40	34,022
~~September 30~~		at ~~Georgia State~~*		~~Georgia State Stadium~~; ~~Atlanta, GA~~		Cancelled	
October 6	6:00 p.m.	at UConn		Rentschler Field; East Hartford, CT	ESPN	W 70–31	19,230
October 14	2:45 p.m.	No. 25 Navy		Liberty Bowl Memorial Stadium; Memphis, TN	ESPNU	W 30–27	40,177
October 19	7:00 p.m.	at Houston	No. 25	TDECU Stadium; Houston, TX	ESPN	W 42–38	30,001
October 27	7:00 p.m.	Tulane	No. 24	Liberty Bowl Memorial Stadium; Memphis, TN	CBSSN	W 56–26	17,989
November 3	7:00 p.m.	at Tulsa	No. 23	H. A. Chapman Stadium; Tulsa, OK	ESPN2	W 41–14	17,383
November 18	11:00 a.m.	SMU	No. 21	Liberty Bowl Memorial Stadium; Memphis, TN	ESPNews	W 66–45	35,329
November 25	11:00 a.m.	East Carolina	No. 20	Liberty Bowl Memorial Stadium; Memphis, TN	ESPNU	W 70–13	41,517
December 2	11:00 a.m.	at No. 14 UCF	No. 20	Spectrum Stadium; Orlando, FL (The American Championship)	ABC	L 55–62 ^{2OT}	41,433
December 30	11:30 a.m.	Iowa State*	No. 20	Liberty Bowl Memorial Stadium; Memphis, TN (Liberty Bowl)	ABC	L 20–21	57,266
*Non-conference game; ^{†}Homecoming; Rankings from AP Poll and CFP Rankings after October 31 released prior to game; All times are in Central time

== Game summaries ==
=== Louisiana–Monroe ===
	1	2	3	4	Total
Warhawks	7	0	7	15	29
Tigers	7	13	17	0	37

=== UCLA ===
	1	2	3	4	Total
No. 25 Bruins	7	17	14	7	45
Tigers	7	20	14	7	48

=== Southern Illinois ===
	1	2	3	4	Total
Salukis	14	7	3	7	31
Tigers	7	10	17	10	44

=== At UCF ===
	1	2	3	4	Total
Tigers	7	0	0	6	13
Knights	6	17	7	10	40

=== At UConn ===
	1	2	3	4	Total
Tigers	7	28	21	14	70
Huskies	14	10	0	7	31

=== Navy ===
	1	2	3	4	Total
No. 25 Midshipmen	10	0	9	8	27
Tigers	7	3	10	10	30

=== At Houston ===
	1	2	3	4	Total
No. 25 Tigers	0	0	21	21	42
Cougars	7	10	14	7	38

=== Tulane ===
	1	2	3	4	Total
Green Wave	0	12	7	7	26
No. 24 Tigers	14	21	0	21	56

=== At Tulsa ===
	1	2	3	4	Total
No. 22 Tigers	14	7	10	10	41
Golden Hurricane	7	7	0	0	14

=== SMU ===
	1	2	3	4	Total
Mustangs	10	14	14	7	45
No. 18 Tigers	10	21	14	21	66

=== East Carolina ===
	1	2	3	4	Total
Pirates	0	0	13	0	13
No. 17 Tigers	28	21	14	7	70

=== At UCF–AAC Championship ===
	1	2	3	4	OT	2OT	Total
No. 16 Tigers	7	24	3	14	7	0	55
No. 12 Knights	17	7	21	3	7	7	62

=== Vs. Iowa State–Liberty Bowl ===
	1	2	3	4	Total
Cyclones	7	7	7	0	21
No. 19 Tigers	7	3	10	0	20

== Rankings ==
Ranking movements Legend: ██ Increase in ranking ██ Decrease in ranking — = Not ranked RV = Received votes
	Week															
Poll	Pre	1	2	3	4	5	6	7	8	9	10	11	12	13	14	Final
AP	—	—	—	RV	RV	RV	RV	25	24	22	20	18	17	16	19	25
Coaches	RV	RV	RV	RV	RV	RV	RV	RV	RV	21	19	17	16	14	18	24
CFP	Not released									23	22	21	20	20	20	Not released

== Players in the 2018 NFL draft ==
Player	Position	Round	Pick	NFL club
Anthony Miller	WR	2	51	Chicago Bears
Genard Avery	LB	5	150	Cleveland Browns

== Roster ==
2017 Memphis Tigers football team roster
Players
Coaches
Offense

Pos.	#	Name	Class
RB	1	Tony Pollard	RSo
QB	2	David Moore	RFr
WR	3	Anthony Miller	RSr
QB	4	Riley Ferguson	Sr
TE	5	Sean Dykes	So
RB	6	Patrick Taylor Jr.	So
QB	7	Brady Davis	RSo
RB	8	Darrell Henderson	So
WR	9	John "Pop" Williams	So
WR	10	Damonte Coxie	RFr
WR	11	Sam Craft	RSr
WR	13	Kedarian Jones	RSo
QB	15	Connor Adair	Fr
WR	18	Roderick Proctor	Sr
RB	21	Timothy Taylor	Fr
WR	22	Jaiden Woodson	Fr
WR	25	Tre'Veon Hamilton	Jr
WR	27	Jahod Booker	RFr
RB	28	Doroland Dorceus	RSr
RB	31	Anthony Young	RSr
RB	32	Marquavius Weaver	Fr
WR	37	Brennon Lewis	Fr
WR	43	Jaylen McClanahan	RSo
TE	44	Steven Enis	RSo
TE	45	Dylan Parham	Fr
TE	46	Carson Short	Fr
TE	49	Scottie Dill	RSo
OL	50	Lio Lafaele	Sr
OL	51	Jace Neville	RJr
OL	53	Dustin Woodard	So
OL	54	Drew Kyser	Jr
OL	55	Mikhail Hill	Fr
OL	59	Brytain Peddy	RSo
OL	63	Ryan Young	RFr
OL	64	Daly Cull	Fr
OL	65	Josiah Perry	Fr
OL	66	Roger Joseph	Jr
OL	67	Davian Jones	Fr
OL	70	Harneet Gill	RJr
OL	71	Gabe Kuhn	RSr
OL	72	Trevon Tate	RJr
OL	74	Michael Joseph	Fr
OL	75	Tauvaga Ho Ching II	RSo
TE	76	John Hassell	Fr
OL	77	Obinna Eze	Fr
WR	80	Coye Fairman	Fr
WR	81	Mechane Slade	RSo
WR	82	Hunter Hill	RFr
TE	83	Nick Robinson	Fr
WR	84	Calvin Austin III	Fr
TE	86	Joey Magnifico	RSo
TE	87	Ross Burcham	RSo
TE	88	Tyce Daniel	Fr
WR	89	Phil Mayhue	Sr

Defense

Pos.	#	Name	Class
DL	1	O'Bryan Goodson	Fr
DB	2	Terrell "TJ" Carter	Fr
DB	4	Josh Perry	RFr
LB	6	Genard Avery	Sr
LB	7	Curtis Akins	RJr
DB	9	Jamil Collins	RSr
DB	12	La'Andre Thomas	Fr
DB	14	Jonathan Cook	Sr
DL	15	Christian Johnson	RSr
LB	16	Nehemiah Augustus	RFr
DB	18	Tim Gordon	RJr
DB	19	Shaun Rupert	RSr
DB	21	Marcus Green	Jr
DB	22	Tyrez Lindsey	RFr
LB	23	JJ Russell	Fr
DB	24	Tito Windham	Jr
DB	25	Austin Hall	RSo
LB	26	Cade Mashburn	Fr
DB	28	Carlito Gonzalez	Fr
LB	29	Darian Porter	RSr
LB	30	Shareef White	Sr
DB	31	Quindon Lewis	Fr
DB	32	Jacobi Francis	RFr
DB	33	Tamaurice Smith	Fr
LB	34	Jackson Dillon	RSr
LB	35	Tim Hart	RFr
DB	36	Ladarius Jordan	RSo
DB	37	Caelon Harden	RSr
DL	38	Jonathan Wilson	So
DB	39	Christian Slaughter	RSr
DB	40	Thomas Pickens	RFr
DB	41	Sanchez Blake Jr.	Fr
DB	42	Xavier "Zay" Cullens	Fr
LB	42	Zane Sutherland	RSo
DB	44	Ashton Merrett	Fr
DB	45	Bradley Jones	Fr
DB	46	Alex Gaca	Fr
DB	47	Colton Cochran	RFr
DL	48	Ernest Suttles	RSr
LB	49	Tyler Garvey	Fr
LB	50	Mannie Lowery	RSr
DL	51	Barrett Brown	Fr
DL	52	Jacoby Hill	RFr
DL	54	Joseph Dorceus	RFr
LB	55	Bryce Huff	So
LB	56	Fred Walls	RSo
LB	57	Hayden Ferrari	RSo
LB	59	Chandler Stump	RFr
DL	78	Carson White	RSo
DL	90	John Tate	RFr
DL	92	Peyton Jones	RSo
DL	93	Desmond Hawkins	Jr
DL	94	Freddie Dillard	RFr
DL	96	Khalil Johnson	RSo
DL	97	Emmanuel Cooper	Jr
DL	98	Jared Gentry	Jr
DL	99	Braylon Brown	Fr

Special teams

Pos.	#	Name	Class
P	17	Spencer Smith	RSr
P	27	Aiden Daily	Jr
P	35	Evan Michael	RSr
PK	36	Riley Patterson	Fr
LS	43	Connor Choate	Fr
P	47	Nick Jacobs	Sr
P	48	Adam Williams	Fr
LS	52	Tim Belles	RSo
LS	58	Preston Brady	Fr

Head coach

- Mike Norvell

Coordinators/assistant coaches

- Chris Ball – Defensive Coordinator
- Darrell Dickey – Offensive Coordinator & Running Backs
- Joe Lorig – Special Teams Coordinator/Outside Linebackers Coach
- Kenny Dillingham – Assistant Coach - Quarterbacks & Tight Ends
- David Johnson – Assistant Coach - Wide Receivers
- Dan Lanning – Assistant Coach - Inside Linebackers/Recruiting Coordinator
- Paul Randolph – Assistant Coach - Defensive Line
- Ryan Silverfield – Assistant Coach - Offensive Line/Run Game Coordinator
- Marcus Woodson – Assistant Coach - Defensive Backs
- Josh Storms – Strength and Conditioning Coach
- Jeff Kupper – Director, Football Operations
- Marcus Bell – Director of High School Relations
- Brennan Ball – Quality Control/Defense
- Braxton Brady – Director of Player Relations
- Justin Crouse – Director of Player Personnel
- Matthew Haron – Director of Football Video
- Marc Hohorst – Equipment Manager
- Reggie Howard – Quality Control/Defense
- Spencer Knight – Graduate Assistant/Defense & Special Teams
- Brian Michalowski – Graduate Assistant, Defense
- Mark Modleski – Quality Control/Offense
- Sherman Morris – Director of Recruiting Operations
- Akoya Nelson – Recruiting Secretary
- Larry Reynolds – Assistant Athletic Trainer
- Sherri Schwartz – Assistant to the Head Coach
- Austin Tucker – Graduate Assistant/Offense
- Darrell Turner – Head Athletic Trainer

Legend

- (C) Team captain
- (S) Suspended
- (I) Ineligible
- Injured
- Redshirt

Roster
