= Brian Peavy =

American football player (born 1996)

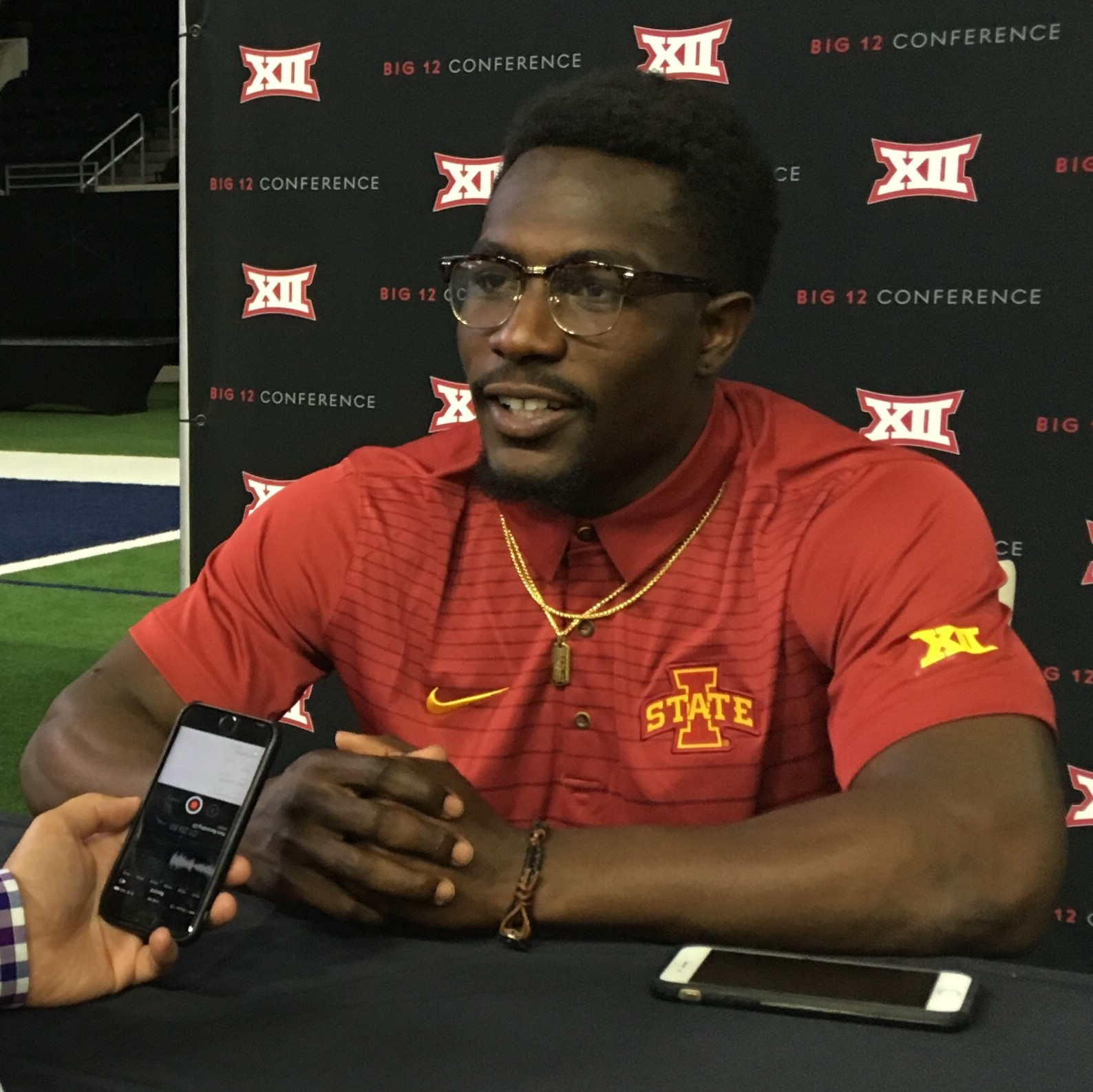
- Peavy at 2017 Big 12 Media Days

No. 10 – Iowa State Cyclones
- Position: Defensive back
- Class: Redshirt Senior

Personal information
- Born: April 14, 1996 (age 30); Houston, Texas, U.S.
- Listed height: 5 ft 9 in (1.75 m)
- Listed weight: 190 lb (86 kg)

Career information
- High school: Westfield (Houston)
- College: Iowa State (2014–2018)

Awards and highlights
- First-Team Pro Football Focus All-American (2018); 2× Second-team All-Big 12 (2017, 2018); 2× ESPN.com Big 12 All-Underclassman (2015, 2016)
- Stats at ESPN

Brian Keith Peavy (born May 14, 1996) is a college American football defensive back for the Iowa State Cyclones. His accolades during his college career include but are not limited to 2017 Second-team All-Big 12 as well as 2016 and 2015 Honorable Mention All-Big 12.

== Early life ==
At Westfield High School in Houston, Peavy was a three sport star. In addition to football he was the starting point guard in basketball and a District 13-5A champion in long jump in 2013. His junior season he tallied 49 tackles and two interceptions on his way to a 12–1 record. His senior season he posted nine interceptions, 38 tackles and three touchdowns finishing with a 13–1 record. He was named First-team All-district 13-5A in both his junior and senior seasons.

=== Recruiting ===
A three star recruit, Peavy's only two offers were Texas Tech and Iowa State. On December 16, 2014, he committed to the Cyclones.

College recruiting
Name	Hometown	School	Height	Weight	Commit date
Brian Peavy; DB	Houston, Texas	Westfield	5 ft 9 in (1.75 m)	170 lb (77 kg)	Dec 16, 2014
Brian Peavy; DB	Recruit ratings: Scout: Rivals: 247Sports: (74)				
Overall recruit ranking: 247Sports: 1,292, 176 (TX), 99 (DB) ESPN: 189 (TX), 61 (DB)
Note: In many cases, Scout, Rivals, 247Sports, On3, and ESPN may conflict in their listings of height and weight.; In these cases, the average was taken. ESPN grades are on a 100-point scale.; Sources: "2014 Iowa State Football Commitment List". Rivals.; "2014 Iowa State Football Commits". Scout.; "ESPN". ESPN.; "Scout.com Team Recruiting Rankings". Scout.; "2014 Team Ranking". Rivals.com.

== College career ==
=== 2015 season ===
After redshirting his initial college season Peavy made his debut in 2015. He led the team in tackles, passes defended, and interceptions with 82, 10, and two respectively. His 82 tackles were second most among Big 12 freshman. In his Cyclone debut against UNI Peavy had seven tackles, including a tackle for loss, and he defended two passes. Against Toledo he had his first career interception on top of six tackles and three pass breakups. He had 10, nine, and 12 tackles against Kansas, TCU, and Oklahoma State respectively.

He was named to the Honorable Mention All-Big 12 team as well as the ESPN.com Big 12 All-Underclassman team.

=== 2016 season ===
In 2016 Peavy built upon the success of his freshman campaign. He once again led the team in passes defended with 11 and was fourth on the team in tackles with 62. His 12 pass breakups were good enough for fourth in the Big 12. Peavy had another strong outing against UNI with five tackles and a forced fumble. Had got his third career interception and defended two passes against San Jose State. His season-high in tackles was eight against Oklahoma.

Following the season he was once again named to the Honorable Mention All-Big 12 team as well as the ESPN.com Big 12 All-Underclassman team.

=== 2017 season ===
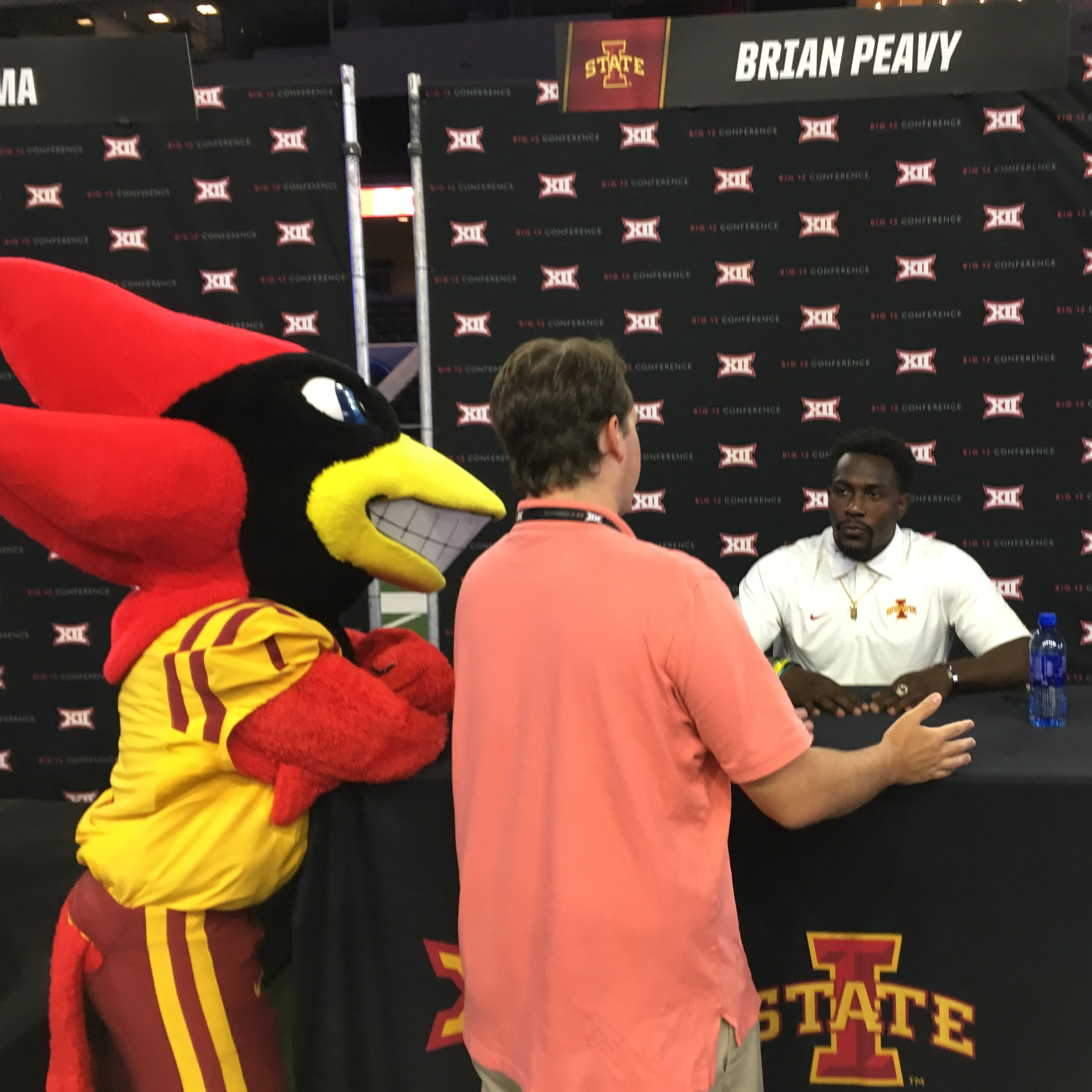
Peavy conducting an interview at 2018 Big 12 Media Day, with Cy the Cardinal observing.

Peavy continued his success on the field in 2017. He was first on the team in pass breakups with seven and third in tackles as well as second in interceptions with 81 and two respectively. Against UNI he 10 tackles, one for a loss, an interception and a pass breakup. He had seven tackles and a 70 interception against TCU. In his strongest outing of the season against Baylor Peavy made nine solo tackles, two for a loss, broke up a pass, and both forced and recovered a fumble. He earned Big 12 Defensive Player of the Week honors for the feat.

He was named Second-team All-Big 12 by both the coaches and AP.

=== College statistics ===
Year	Team	Games		Tackles				Interceptions					Fumbles	
Year	Team	G	GS	Comb	Solo	Ast	TFL	PD	Int	Yds	Avg	TD	FF	FR
2015	Iowa State	12	11	82	54	28	3.5	10	2	-1	-0.5	0	1	0
2016	Iowa State	12	10	62	41	21	1.5	11	1	4	4.0	0	1	0
2017	Iowa State	13	13	88	49	39	6.0	9	2	70	35.0	0	1	2
College totals		37	34	232	144	88	11.0	30	5	73	14.6	0	3	2
