= Jake Campos =

American football player (born 1994)

No. 63, 72
- Position: Offensive tackle

Personal information
- Born: October 18, 1994 (age 32); West Des Moines, Iowa
- Listed height: 6 ft 7 in (2.01 m)
- Listed weight: 320 lb (145 kg)

Career information
- High school: Valley (IA)
- College: Iowa State
- NFL draft: 2018: undrafted

Career history
- Dallas Cowboys (2018–2019)*; St. Louis BattleHawks (2020)
- * Offseason or practice squad member only

Awards and highlights
- Second-team All-Big 12 (2017)
- Stats at Pro Football Reference

Jake Campos (born October 18, 1994) is an American former football offensive tackle. He was a member of the Dallas Cowboys of the National Football League (NFL). He played college football at Iowa State University.

== Early life ==
Campos attended Valley High School, where he played football, basketball, baseball and track. He contributed to the school winning the Iowa prep Class 4A state championship.

He placed third at the state track meet in the shot put as a junior. He received All-Conference honors both his junior and senior seasons. He received All-state honors as a senior. He earned academic honors all four years.

== College career ==
Campos accepted a football scholarship from Iowa State University. As a redshirt freshman, he started three games at right tackle and the final eight contests at left tackle.

As a sophomore, he was named the starter at left tackle. As a junior in 2016, he suffered a season-ending leg injury in fall camp. As a senior, he regained his starting position at left tackle. He finished his college career with 36 starts.

== Professional career ==
=== Dallas Cowboys ===
Campos was signed as an undrafted free agent by the Dallas Cowboys after the 2018 NFL draft on April 30. He was waived on September 1 and signed to the practice squad the next day. On January 14, 2019, he was signed to a future contract. He was released on August 31.

=== St. Louis BattleHawks (XFL) ===
In October 2019, he was selected by the St. Louis BattleHawks during phase 2 of the 2020 XFL draft. He was named the starter at left tackle for the season opener. He was placed on the injured reserve list with a leg injury on February 17. In March, amid the COVID-19 pandemic, the league announced that it would be cancelling the rest of the season. He appeared in 2 out of 5 games. He had his contract terminated when the league suspended operations on April 10, 2020.
