= Steven Wirtel =

American football player (born 1997)

No. 46
- Position: Long snapper

Personal information
- Born: October 3, 1997 (age 29); Orland Park, Illinois, U.S.
- Listed height: 6 ft 4 in (1.93 m)
- Listed weight: 228 lb (103 kg)

Career information
- High school: Mount Carmel (Chicago, Illinois)
- College: Iowa State (2016–2019)
- NFL draft: 2020: undrafted

Career history
- Detroit Lions (2020)*; Los Angeles Rams (2021)*; Green Bay Packers (2021–2022)
- * Offseason or practice squad member only

Career NFL statistics
- Games played: 9
- Total tackles: 1
- Stats at Pro Football Reference

Steven Wirtel (born October 3, 1997) is an American former professional football player who was a long snapper in the National Football League (NFL). Wirtel played college football for the Iowa State Cyclones, and signed with the Detroit Lions as an undrafted free agent in 2020. Wirtel also played for the Los Angeles Rams and Green Bay Packers.

== Personal life and high school ==
Steven Wirtel was born on October 3, 1997, in Orland Park, Illinois to John and Coleen Wirtel. His brother, John Wirtel, played long snapper for Kansas. Wirtel attended Mount Carmel High School where he played football.

== College career ==
Rated as a three-star recruit coming out of high school, Wirtel chose to attend Iowa State over Illinois and Georgia. In his freshmen year, Wirtel played in all 12 games that season and was perfect on all of his snaps. He was named to the Big 12 Academic Rookie Team. In his second year, Wirtel once again played in all 13 games and was perfect again on all his snaps. He was named on the Third-Team All-Big 12 and the First-Team Academic All-Big 12 team. In his junior year, Wirtel once again played in all 13 games, and began to assume the role of long snapper for every aspect of special teams. He was named on the First-Team All-Big 12 and Second-Team Academic All-Big 12 teams. In his senior and final year, Wirtel once again played in all 13 games and therefore played in every game of his collegiate career. He was one of three finalists for the Patrick Mannelly Award, and was named on the First Team All-Big 12 and First Team Academic All-Big 12 teams.

== Professional career ==
Pre-draft measurables
| Height | Weight | Arm length | Hand span | 40-yard dash | 10-yard split | 20-yard split | 20-yard shuttle | Three-cone drill | Vertical jump | Broad jump | Bench press |
|---|---|---|---|---|---|---|---|---|---|---|---|
| 6 ft 3 3/4 in (1.92 m) | 235 lb (107 kg) | 31 1/8 in (0.79 m) | 9 3/8 in (0.24 m) | 4.76 s | 1.70 s | 2.81 s | 4.28 s | 7.12 s | 26.0 in (0.66 m) | 10 ft 0 in (3.05 m) | 19 reps |
All values from NFL Combine

=== Detroit Lions ===
After going undrafted in the 2020 NFL draft, Wirtel signed as an undrafted free agent for the Detroit Lions. Wirtel remained on the Lions' practice squad throughout the entirety of the 2020 NFL season and was waived in the subsequent offseason.

=== Los Angeles Rams ===
Wirtel was signed by the Los Angeles Rams at the beginning of the 2021 NFL season. He was later released on August 26.

=== Green Bay Packers ===
On September 2, 2021, the Green Bay Packers signed Wirtel to their practice squad. He was signed to the active roster on November 5, 2021, replacing the recently released Hunter Bradley. He made his first appearance in an NFL game two days later, in a 13–7 loss to the Kansas City Chiefs.

On August 10, 2022, the Green Bay Packers released Wirtel.
