= 2017 All-Big 12 Conference football team =

The 2017 All-Big 12 Conference football team consists of American football players chosen as All-Big 12 Conference players for the 2017 Big 12 Conference football season. The conference recognizes two official All-Big 12 selectors: (1) the Big 12 conference coaches selected separate offensive and defensive units and named first- and second-team players (the "Coaches" team); and (2) a panel of sports writers and broadcasters covering the Big 12 also selected offensive and defensive units and named first- and second-team players (the "Media" team).

== Offensive selections ==
=== Quarterbacks ===
- Baker Mayfield, Oklahoma (Coaches-1; Media-1)
- Mason Rudolph, Oklahoma State (Coaches-2; Media-2)

=== Running backs ===
- David Montgomery, Iowa State (Coaches-1; Media-1)
- Justice Hill, Oklahoma State (Coaches-1; Media-1)
- Rodney Anderson, Oklahoma (Coaches-2; Media-2)
- Justin Crawford, West Virginia (Coaches-2; Media-2)

=== Fullbacks ===
- Dimitri Flowers, Oklahoma (Coaches-1)
- Winston Dimel, Kansas State (Coaches-2)

=== Centers ===
- Erick Wren, Oklahoma (Coaches-1; Media-1)
- Brad Lundblade, Oklahoma State (Coaches-1; Media-2)

=== Guards ===
- Marcus Keyes, Oklahoma State (Media-1)
- Ben Powers, Oklahoma (Coaches-2; Media-1)
- Dru Samia, Oklahoma (Coaches-2; Media-2)
- Matt Pryor, TCU (Coaches-2; Media-2)

=== Tackles ===
- Orlando Brown, Oklahoma (Coaches-1; Media-1)
- Dalton Risner, Kansas State (Coaches-1; Media-1)
- Zach Crabtree, Oklahoma State (Coaches-1; Media-2)
- Jake Campos, Iowa State (Coaches-2; Media-2)
- Yodny Cajuste, West Virginia (Coaches-2)

=== Tight ends ===
- Mark Andrews, Oklahoma (Coaches-1; Media-1)
- Ben Johnson, Kansas (Coaches-2; Media-2)
- Chase Allen, Iowa State (Coaches-2)

=== Receivers ===
- James Washington, Oklahoma State (Coaches-1; Media-1)
- David Sills, West Virginia (Coaches-1; Media-1)
- Allen Lazard, Iowa State (Coaches-1; Media-2)
- Keke Coutee, Texas Tech (Coaches-2; Media-2)
- Denzel Mims, Baylor (Coaches-2)
- Marcell Ateman, Oklahoma State (Coaches-2)
- Gary Jennings Jr., West Virginia (Coaches-2)

== Defensive selections ==
=== Defensive linemen ===
- Mat Boesen, TCU (Coaches-1; Media-1)
- Poona Ford, Texas (Coaches-1; Media-1)
- Will Geary, Kansas State (Coaches-1; Media-1)
- DeQuinton Osborne, Oklahoma State (Coaches-1; Media-2)
- Daniel Wise, Kansas (Coaches-1; Media-2)
- Ben Banogu, TCU (Media-1)
- Dorance Armstrong Jr., Kansas (Coaches-2; Media-2)
- Jordan Brailford, Oklahoma State (Coaches-2; Media-2)
- JD Waggoner, Iowa State (Coaches-2)
- Reggie Walker, Kansas State (Coaches-2)
- D.J. Ward, Oklahoma (Coaches-2)

=== Linebackers ===
- Ogbonnia Okoronkwo, Oklahoma (Coaches-1; Media-1)
- Malik Jefferson, Texas (Coaches-1; Media-1)
- Travin Howard, TCU (Coaches-1; Media-2)
- Joel Lanning, Iowa State (Coaches-2; Media-1)
- Joe Dineen Jr., Kansas (Coaches-2; Media-2)
- Dakota Allen, Texas Tech (Coaches-2; Media-2)

=== Defensive backs ===
- Kamari Cotton-Moya, Iowa State (Coaches-1; Media-1)
- D. J. Reed, Kansas State (Coaches-1; Media-1)
- DeShon Elliott, Texas (Coaches-1; Media-1)
- Ranthony Texada, TCU (Coaches-1; Media-1)
- Tre Flowers, Oklahoma State (Coaches-1; Media-2)
- Nick Orr, TCU (Coaches-1; Media-2)
- Brian Peavy, Iowa State (Coaches-2; Media-2)
- Steven Parker, Oklahoma (Coaches-2)
- Jah'Shawn Johnson, Texas Tech (Coaches-2)
- Justus Parker, Texas Tech (Coaches-2)
- Kyzir White, West Virginia (Coaches-2)
- Kris Boyd, Texas (Media-2)

== Special teams ==
=== Kickers ===
- Matthew McCrane, Kansas State (Coaches-1; Media-1)
- Austin Seibert, Oklahoma (Coaches-2; Media-2)

=== Punters ===
- Michael Dickson, Texas (Coaches-1; Media-1)
- Nick Walsh, Kansas State (Coaches-2; Media-2)

=== All-purpose / Return specialists ===
- KaVontae Turpin, TCU (Coaches-1; Media-1)
- D. J. Reed, Kansas State (Coaches-1; Media-2)
- Marcus Simms, West Virginia (Coaches-2)

== Key ==
Bold = selected as a first-team player by both the coaches and media panel

Coaches = selected by Big 12 Conference coaches

Media = selected by a media panel

== See also ==
- 2017 College Football All-America Team
