= Willie Harvey Jr. =

American football player (born 1996)

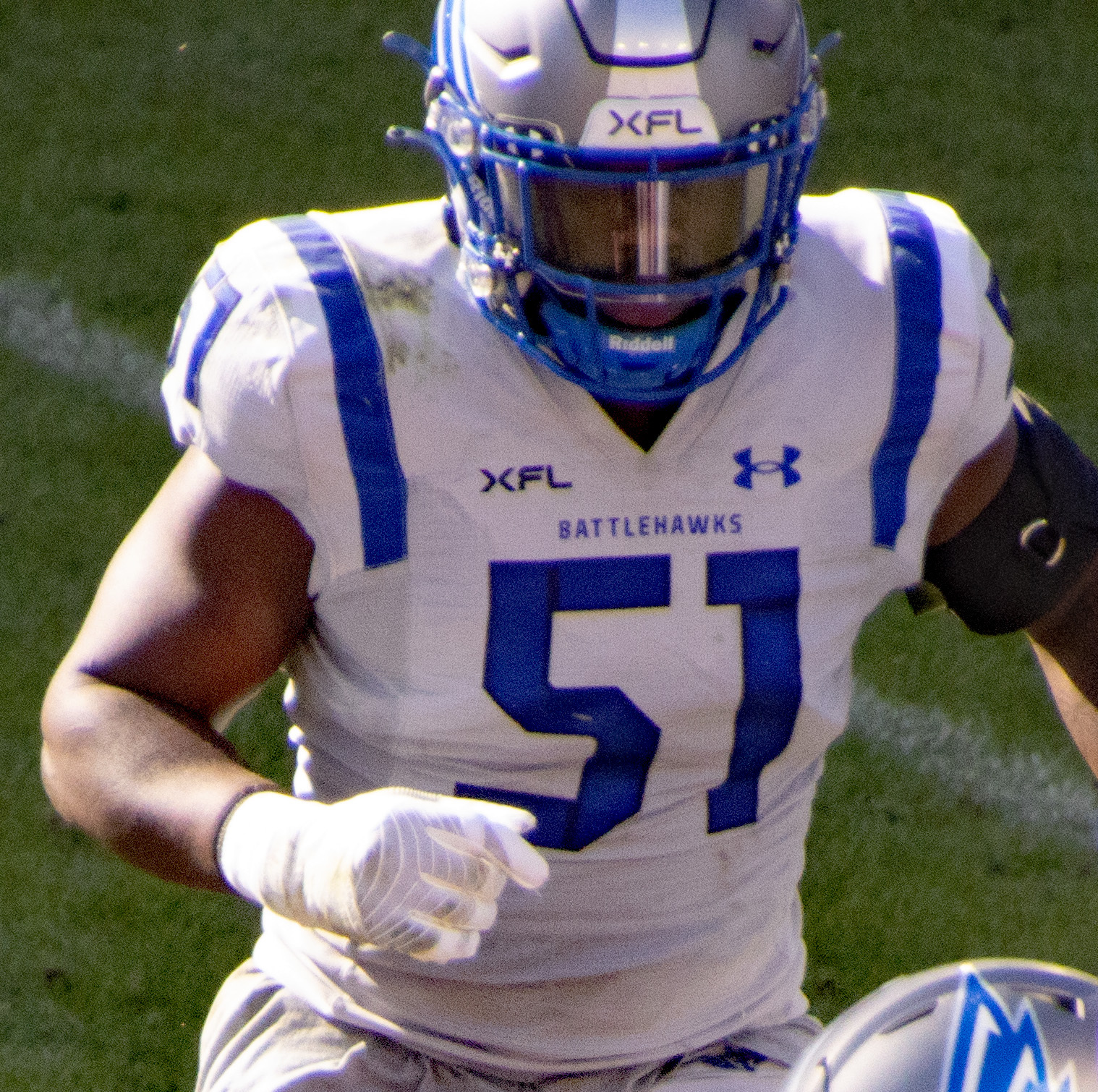
- Harvey with the St. Louis BattleHawks in 2023

Profile
- Position: Linebacker

Personal information
- Born: January 9, 1996 (age 30); Hastings, Florida, U.S.
- Listed height: 5 ft 11 in (1.80 m)
- Listed weight: 230 lb (104 kg)

Career information
- High school: Pedro Menendez (St. Augustine, Florida)
- College: Iowa State
- NFL draft: 2019: undrafted

Career history
- Cleveland Browns (2019–2021); St. Louis BattleHawks (2023–2024); Dallas Cowboys (2024)*; St. Louis BattleHawks (2025)
- * Offseason or practice squad member only

Awards and highlights
- 2× All-UFL Team (2024, 2025); UFL tackles leader (2024)

Career NFL statistics
- Total tackles: 2
- Stats at Pro Football Reference

Willie Harvey Jr. (born January 9, 1996) is an American professional football linebacker. He played college football at Iowa State. He has also played for the Cleveland Browns, and Dallas Cowboys of the National Football League (NFL).

== Early life ==
Harvey grew up in Hastings, Florida. He attended Pedro Menendez High School, where he played linebacker as a senior, recording 131 tackles, including 49 solo stops, four sacks and three forced fumbles as a senior. Harvey was named first-team all-state by the Sun Sentinel and a Class 5A Elite all-state team member.

== College career ==
Harvey played for the Iowa State Cyclones from 2014 to 2018 at all three linebacker spots. After redshirting in 2014, he started eight of 12 games played as a RS Freshman, finishing fourth on the team in tackles with 59. He started nine of 12 games played his sophomore season, where he tied for the team lead in tackles (78) and ranked second on the team in both TFL (7.5) and sacks (3.0). Harvey was named Honorable Mention All-Big 12. Harvey started all 12 games played at outside linebacker as a junior, where he posted 76 tackles and ranked second on the team in TFL (11.5), fourth in sacks (4.0), and had an interception, forced fumble, fumble recovery and five pass breakups. He was once again named Honorable Mention All-Big 12 following his junior season. In 2018, Harvey started all 13 games at outside linebacker, where he finished second on the team in tackles (76), tied for second in TFL (9.0) and second on the team in sacks (3.5). Harvey was named Honorable Mention All-Big 12 for the third straight season. Harvey was selected to participate in the NFLPA Collegiate Bowl in January 2019.

== Professional career ==
Pre-draft measurables
Height	Weight	Arm length	Hand span	40-yard dash	10-yard split	20-yard split	20-yard shuttle	Three-cone drill	Vertical jump	Broad jump	Bench press
5 ft 11 1/4 in (1.81 m)	229 lb (104 kg)	30 1/2 in (0.77 m)	10 1/8 in (0.26 m)	4.65 s	1.59 s	2.64 s	4.49 s	7.08 s	34.0 in (0.86 m)	10 ft 0 in (3.05 m)	18 reps
All values from Iowa State's Pro Day

=== Cleveland Browns ===
Although he received draftable grades by a few NFL teams, Harvey ended up signing as an undrafted free agent by the Cleveland Browns after the 2019 NFL draft. He was waived by the Browns on August 31, 2019 and was signed to the practice squad the next day. He was promoted to the active roster on September 21, 2019. He was placed on injured reserve on October 4.

Harvey was waived by the Browns on September 5, 2020.

The Browns re-signed Harvey on August 20, 2021. Harvey was waived by the Browns on August 31, 2021.

The Browns re-signed Harvey for a third time on December 18, 2021, following 20+ positive COVID-19 tests on the Browns active roster. He was waived on January 8, 2022. He signed a reserve/futures contract with the Browns on January 11, 2022. Harvey was waived by the Browns on August 30, 2022.

=== St. Louis BattleHawks (first stint) ===
On November 17, 2022, Harvey was drafted by the St. Louis BattleHawks of the XFL. He re-signed with the team on January 30, 2024. He was named to the 2024 All-UFL team on June 5, 2024. He had his contract terminated on June 18, 2024, to sign with an NFL team.

=== Dallas Cowboys ===
On June 18, 2024, Harvey signed with the Dallas Cowboys. He was waived on August 26.

=== St. Louis BattleHawks (second stint) ===
On January 17, 2025, Harvey re-signed with the Battlehawks. Harvey was named to the 2025 All-UFL Team.
