= Joel Lanning =

American football player and coach (born 1994)

Personal information
- Born: November 18, 1994 (age 31); Ankeny, Iowa, U.S.
- Listed height: 6 ft 1 in (1.85 m)
- Listed weight: 238 lb (108 kg)

Career information
- High school: Ankeny
- College: Iowa State (2013–2017)
- NFL draft: 2018: undrafted

Career history

Playing
- Dallas Cowboys (2018)*; San Antonio Commanders (2019)
- * Offseason or practice squad member only

Coaching
- Iowa State (2019) Quality control assistant; Iowa State (2020) Graduate assistant

Awards and highlights
- All-American (2017); All-Big 12 (2017)

Joel Lanning (born November 18, 1994) is an American former football quarterback and linebacker. He played college football at Iowa State University.

== Early life ==
Lanning was a multi-sport star at Ankeny High School, earning all-state selections in football, baseball, and wrestling.

As a sophomore, he tallied 1,230 passing yards and 669 rushing yards, receiving second-team All-Conference honors.

As a junior, he passed for 1,723 yards and rushed for 636 yards, receiving All-Conference honors.

As a senior in 2012, he led the team to a 14-0 record and the state championship, while setting school records in total yards (3,384), passing yards (2,315), rushing yards (1,082) by a quarterback and had 39 total touchdowns (22 passing and 17 rushing). He received All-Conference, Elite All-State and the Des Moines Register Class 4-A Player of the Year. As a three-year starting quarterback at Ankeny, he recorded 7,642 all-purpose career yards.

In baseball, he was a two-time first-team All-State selection and contributed to the team winning the 2012 state championship. In wrestling, he received all-state honors as a senior.

=== Recruiting ===
After high school Lanning was very lightly recruited for football. His only two offers were Nebraska and Iowa State; he ultimately picked the Cyclones.

College recruiting
Name	Hometown	School	Height	Weight	Commit date
Joel Lanning; QB	Ankeny, Iowa	Ankeny High School	6 ft 2 in (1.88 m)	200 lb (91 kg)	Dec 8, 2012
Joel Lanning; QB	Recruit ratings: Scout: Rivals: 247Sports: (79)				
Overall recruit ranking: Rivals: 4 (IA) 247Sports: 1546, 8 (IA), 72 (QB) ESPN: 2 (IA), 25 (QB)
Note: In many cases, Scout, Rivals, 247Sports, On3, and ESPN may conflict in their listings of height and weight.; In these cases, the average was taken. ESPN grades are on a 100-point scale.; Sources: "2013 Iowa State Football Commitment List". Rivals.; "2013 Iowa State Football Commits". Scout.; "ESPN". ESPN.; "Scout.com Team Recruiting Rankings". Scout.; "2013 Team Ranking". Rivals.com.

== College career ==
=== 2014 season ===
As a redshirt freshman, he only played one game on special teams.

=== 2015 season ===
Lanning played in 11 games and started at quarterback for the final five. He finished the season with 1,247 passing yards and 10 passing touchdowns in addition to 330 rushing yards and four rushing touchdowns.

His season highs included 162 passing yards on 11 of 22 attempts and 130 yards rushing and two rushing touchdowns against Oklahoma State as well as throwing for three touchdowns and 210 yards against Kansas State.

=== 2016 season ===
His junior season, Lanning was a threat through the air as well as on the ground. In addition to throwing for 1,290 yards and nine touchdowns he ran for 518 yard and led the team with 11 rushing touchdowns, this was the 10th most by FBS quarterbacks. He was responsible for 20 of the Cyclone's 39 offensive touchdowns and ended the season with a streak of 121 consecutive passes without an interception.

Against Baylor he threw for 261 yards and two scores on 17 of 23 passes as well as running for 57 yards and an additional touchdown. Lanning had a career day against Texas Tech tying the school record for five rushing touchdowns in a game in addition to breaking the school record for rushing yards by a quarterback with 171 yards on 17 carries.

=== 2017 season ===
At the end of the 2016 season Jacob Park took over as the full-time starting quarterback. In an unheralded move during the off-season, head coach Matt Campbell asked Lanning to switch positions from quarterback to middle linebacker. He was able to work up the depth chart and was the starting middle linebacker for the Cyclones opening game against UNI. Despite starting on defense, Lanning continued to play special teams as well as wildcat quarterback in short yardage and goal line situations. He finished the season leading the team in tackles, second in tackles for a loss, rushing yards, and rushing touchdowns.

His highlights included eight tackles, 1.5 sacks, and an interception against Akron as well as 20 tackles against Texas. Lanning was named the Walter Camp Defensive Player of the Week after a standout performance against #3 Oklahoma that included eight tackles, a sack, a fumble recovery, nine rushing attempts for 35 yards and two passes for 25 yards. In the match-up against Oklahoma State, Lanning had five tackles, half a sack, in addition to throwing a touchdown to Allen Lazard.

At the conclusion of the season he was selected as a first-team All-American and named to the first-team All-Big 12.

=== College statistics ===
			Passing						Rushing				Defense			
Year	Team	GP	Cmp	Att	Pct	Yards	TDs	Int	Att	Yds	Avg	TD	Tackles	For Loss	Sacks	Int
2015	Iowa State	11	107	192	55.7	1,247	10	4	94	330	3.5	4	–	–	–	–
2016	Iowa State	11	99	170	58.2	1,290	9	3	121	518	4.3	11	–	–	–	–
2017	Iowa State	12	3	4	75.0	47	1	0	40	135	3.4	2	114	11.0	6.0	1
College totals		34	209	366	57.1	2,584	20	7	249	963	3.9	16	114	11.0	6.0	1

== Professional career ==
=== Dallas Cowboys ===
Lanning was signed as an undrafted free agent by the Dallas Cowboys after the 2018 NFL draft on April 30. He was waived on September 1, 2018.

=== San Antonio Commanders ===
On October 12, 2018, Lanning signed with the San Antonio Commanders of the Alliance of American Football. The league ceased operations in April 2019.

== Personal life ==
In 2019, Lanning was hired as a defensive quality control assistant for the football team at Iowa State University. In 2020, he was named a graduate assistant on defense.
