= Tom Manning (American football) =

American football player and coach (born 1983)

Indianapolis Colts
- Title: Tight ends coach

Personal information
- Born: July 22, 1983 (age 43); Youngstown, Ohio, U.S.

Career information
- Position: Offensive tackle
- College: Mount Union (2001–2005)

Career history
- Jackson HS (OH) (2006) Offensive line coach; Emory & Henry (2007–2008) Offensive line coach / run game coordinator; Toledo (2009) Graduate assistant; Toledo (2010) Dir. of football operations; Mount Union (2011) Offensive line coach; Toledo (2012–2015) Offensive line coach; Iowa State (2016–2017) Offensive coordinator / offensive line coach; Indianapolis Colts (2018) Tight ends coach; Iowa State (2019-2022); Offensive coordinator / running backs coach (2019); Offensive coordinator / tight ends coach (2020); Offensive coordinator (2021-2022); Indianapolis Colts (2023–present) Tight ends coach

Tom Manning (born July 22, 1983) is an American football coach who is the tight ends coach for the Indianapolis Colts of the National Football League (NFL). A native of Youngstown, Ohio, Manning was a first-team all-state player for Ursuline High School, and captained its football team to its first state championship. He previously served as the offensive coordinator at Iowa State.

== Coaching career ==
Manning began his coaching career at the high school level, coaching the offensive line at Jackson High School in Massillon, Ohio. He went on to coach at Emory & Henry as the offensive line coach and run game coordinator before moving on to Toledo as a graduate assistant and later their director of operations. He spent one year at his alma mater Mount Union as an offensive line coach before being hired once again at Toledo.

=== Toledo (second stint) ===
Manning was named the offensive line coach at Toledo in 2012, reuniting with Matt Campbell who was his teammate and later his position coach at Mount Union.

=== Iowa State ===
Manning followed Campbell after the latter was named the head coach at Iowa State in 2016. He was promoted to offensive coordinator in addition to his duties as offensive line coach.

=== Indianapolis Colts ===
Manning was named the tight ends coach for the Indianapolis Colts in 2018, joining Frank Reich's inaugural staff.

=== Iowa State (second stint) ===
Manning rejoined the coaching staff at Iowa State in 2019. In his first year back in Ames, he was named a nominee for the Broyles Award, an award given to the top assistant coach in college football. He was nominated once again for the Broyles Award in 2020. After the 2022 season, Iowa State parted ways with Manning.

=== Cincinnati ===
On January 9, 2023, Manning was announced as the next offensive coordinator at the University of Cincinnati.

=== Indianapolis Colts (second stint) ===
On February 20, 2023, Manning was reported to be the next tight ends coach for the Indianapolis Colts.
