= List of people from Bakersfield, California =

This is a list of notable people from Bakersfield, California. In order to be included, subjects need to have an article and clear connection to the city.

== Notable people ==
=== Arts ===
==== Designers ====
- Marc Davis – animator and one of Disney's Nine Old Men, born in Bakersfield
- Poy Gum Lee – architect, died in Bakersfield

==== Visual artists ====
- Greg Colson – visual artist
- Tyrus Wong – calligrapher, artist, animator, married in 1937 in Bakersfield

=== Business, entrepreneurs ===
- Ric Drasin – designer of Gold's Gym and World Gym logos, retired professional wrestler, actor, author

=== Crime ===
- Vincent Brothers – convicted murderer; shot and stabbed five members of his family to death
- Rodolfo Cadena – Rudy "Cheyenne" Cadena, one of the founders of the Mexican Mafia, basis of character played by Edward James Olmos in the film American Me
- Steven David Catlin – serial killer on California's death row for the murders of his adoptive mother and one of his wives; also killed another wife, for which he received a sentence of life without parole

=== Entertainment ===
==== Film, television, actors, models ====
- Ana Lily Amirpour – filmmaker, director, writer
- Noah Beery – actor
- Robert Beltran – actor
- Justin Berry – former teenage webcam pornographer and public speaker
- Kelli Garner – actress
- Frank Gifford – television sportscaster, college and professional football player
- Justin Gordon – actor, producer, artist
- Fay Helm – actress
- Brian Hooks – actor, Soul Plane, Three Strike
- Nathan Jung – actor, martial artist, stunt coordinator
- Dalene Kurtis – model, former Playboy Playmate of the Year
- Joanne Linville – actress
- Guy Madison – actor
- Wayne Mallory – actor
- Roger Mathey – theatrical director, actor, playwright, producer
- Derek Mears – actor and stuntman
- Michelle St. John – actress, singer, director, producer
- Sigrid Valdis – actress
- Anjelika Washington – actress, Stargirl, Tall Girl

==== Musicians ====
- David Benoit – jazz pianist
- Jo Ann Castle – pianist, The Lawrence Welk Show
- Brandon Cruz – punk musician and former child actor
- Merle Haggard – singer, Country Music Hall of Fame inductee
- Michael Lockwood – guitarist and music producer
- Kareem Lopez – musician
- Mary Osborne – jazz guitarist
- Buck Owens – singer, musician Country Music Hall of Fame inductee
- Gregory Porter – singer
- Gloria Roe – composer, pianist and singer
- Sheléa – singer-songwriter
- Lawrence Tibbett – baritone of the New York Metropolitan Opera
- Grant Whitson – drummer for Arlington

===== Bands =====
- Adema – rock band (Dave DeRoo, Kris Kohls, Mark Chavez, Mike Ransom)
- Burning Image – deathrock band (Moe Adame, Tony Bonanno, Paul Burch, Anthony Leyva)
- The Def Dames – female rap duo, hip hop musicians
- Korn – Grammy Award-winning metal band
  - Reginald "Fieldy" Arvizu
  - Jonathan Davis
  - James "Munky" Shaffer
  - David Silveria
  - Brian "Head" Welch

=== Government, law, politics ===
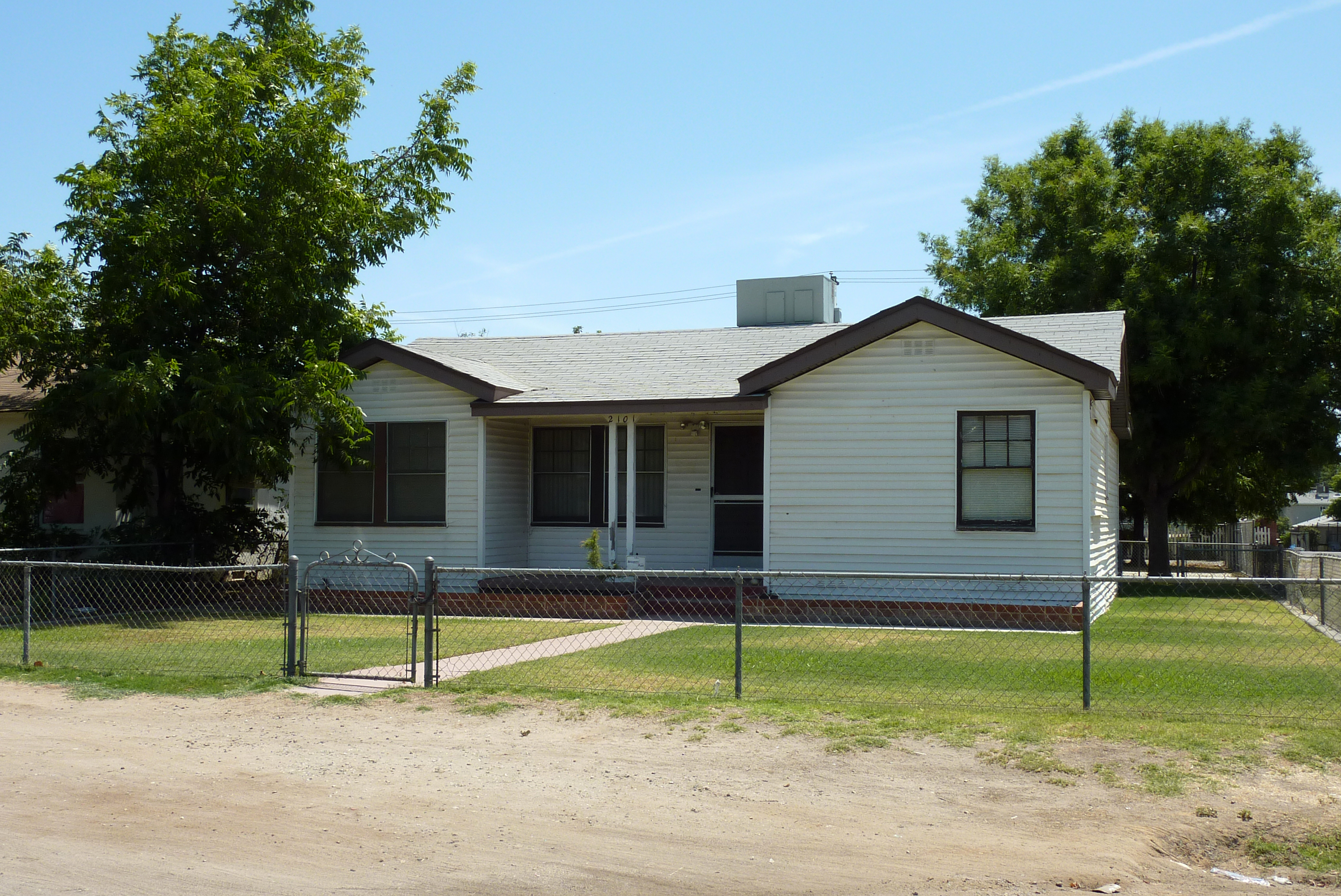
The Bush House in Bakersfield: In 1949, George H. W. Bush (41st President) moved here to sell oil field equipment with son, George W. Bush (43rd President), who was three years old at the time.

- Leonard L. Alvarado – Medal of Honor recipient, specialist 4th Class, United States Army – Republic of Vietnam 1969
- General Edward Fitzgerald Beale – superintendent of Indian Affairs for California and Nevada (1850s), surveyor general of California and Nevada (1860s), U.S. ambassador to Austria-Hungary (1870s), founder of Tejon Ranch
- Vince Fong – California congressman, former California state assemblyman
- Harvey Hall – mayor of Bakersfield (2001–2016)
- Kevin McCarthy – California congressman, House Republican leader, 55th speaker of the United States House of Representatives
- Joe Neguse – U.S. representative for Colorado
- Erik Paulsen – Minnesota congressman
- Walter W. Stiern – California Democratic state senator
- Earl Warren – chief justice of the United States Supreme Court, former governor of California

=== Science, medicine, academia ===
- Hans Einstein – world's foremost authority on Valley Fever
- Carver Mead – pioneer in the field of VLSI design, inventor of the concept of neuromorphic computing

=== Sports ===
==== Olympics ====
- Kamren Larsen – Pan American Games gold medalist BMX racing at 2023 Pan American Games
- Jake Varner – Olympic gold medalist wrestler at 2012 London Games
- Gabe Woodward – Olympic bronze medalist 4 × 100 relay at 2004 Athens Games

==== Baseball ====
- Larry Barnes – California Angels first baseman
- Corbin Burnes – Arizona Diamondbacks pitcher
- Johnny Callison – Philadelphia Phillies right fielder
- Phil Dumatrait – Pittsburgh Pirates pitcher, first-round draft pick
- Jack Hiatt – catcher
- Leon Lee – Nippon Professional Baseball player and manager
- Colby Lewis – Texas Rangers pitcher, first-round draft pick
- William "Buckshot" May – Pittsburgh Pirates pitcher
- Brent Morel – Chicago White Sox third baseman
- Kurt Miller – pitcher for Florida Marlins and Chicago Cubs
- Steve Ontiveros – infielder for San Francisco Giants and Chicago Cubs
- Dave Rader – catcher
- Rick Sawyer – pitcher for the New York Yankees and San Diego Padres
- Todd Walker – second baseman
- Bruce Walton – pitcher for Montreal Expos, pitching coach for Toronto Blue Jays
- Allan Winans – pitcher
- Jake Woods – Seattle Mariners pitcher

==== Basketball ====
- Nikki Blue – New York Liberty guard (WNBA)
- Fred Boyd – NBA player
- Chris Childs – ABA/NBA guard (1989–2003; New Jersey Nets, New York Knicks, Toronto Raptors)
- Erica McCall – WNBA player
- J. R. Sakuragi (formerly J.R. Henderson) – player for Memphis Grizzlies
- Lonnie Shelton – Seattle SuperSonics all-star
- Robert Swift – Tokyo Apache (Japan) center
- Tyrone Wallace – Los Angeles Clippers guard

==== Football ====
- Mike Ariey – offensive tackle for Green Bay Packers
- Jon Baker – NFL and CFL player
- Krys Barnes – linebacker for Arizona Cardinals
- Theo Bell – wide receiver for Pittsburgh Steelers, earned Super Bowl rings in 1979 and 1980
- Steve Boadway – NFL player
- Jeff Buckey – starting offensive lineman for Miami Dolphins
- Vern Burke – tight end for San Francisco 49ers, New Orleans Saints, and Atlanta Falcons
- David Carr – quarterback, first overall selection in 2002 NFL draft (Houston Texans), won Super Bowl with New York Giants
- Derek Carr – quarterback for New Orleans Saints, Mountain West Conference Player of the Year for Fresno State
- Frank Gifford – Pro Football Hall of Fame inductee, broadcaster
- Cory Hall – safety for Cincinnati Bengals, Atlanta Falcons, and Washington Redskins
- Joe Hawley – center for Tampa Bay Buccaneers
- A.J. Jefferson – free safety for Arizona Cardinals
- Cody Kessler – quarterback for Cleveland Browns and USC Trojans
- Rodney Leisle – defensive tackle for New Orleans Saints, member of 2009 Super Bowl-winning team
- Jordan Love – quarterback for the Green Bay Packers
- Bob McCaffrey – center for USC Trojans and Green Bay Packers
- Brent McClanahan – running back for Minnesota Vikings
- Ray Mansfield – center for Pittsburgh Steelers
- Brock Marion – Dallas Cowboys Super Bowl champion and Pro Bowl player
- Jerry Marion – wide receiver for Pittsburgh Steelers, father of Brock
- Ryan Mathews – running back for Philadelphia Eagles and former Fresno State All-American
- Aaron Merz – offensive lineman for University of California and Buffalo Bills
- Stephen Neal – lineman for New England Patriots, Super Bowl champion, NCAA wrestling champion, world gold medalist, Olympian
- Mark Nichols – wide receiver for Detroit Lions
- Jared Norris – NFL player
- Larry Parker – wide receiver for USC Trojans and Kansas City Chiefs
- Joey Porter – All-Pro and Pro Bowl outside linebacker, member of Pittsburgh Steelers Super Bowl champion team in 2006
- Rocky Rasley – guard for Detroit Lions
- D. J. Reed – free safety for New York Jets
- Randy Rich – defensive back for Detroit Lions, Denver Broncos, and Cleveland Browns
- Greg Robinson – defensive coordinator for Denver Broncos, University of Michigan
- Ken Ruettgers – offensive tackle for Green Bay Packers
- Colton Schmidt – punter for Buffalo Bills
- Rashaan Shehee – running back for Kansas City Chiefs
- L. J. Shelton – offensive tackle for Arizona Cardinals
- Jeff Siemon – Pro Bowl linebacker for Minnesota Vikings, inducted to College Football Hall of Fame in 2006
- Kevin Smith – tight end for UCLA, Oakland Raiders, and Green Bay Packers
- Jeremy Staat – defensive lineman for Pittsburgh Steelers, United States Marine
- Jason Stewart – defensive tackle for Indianapolis Colts in 1994
- Michael Stewart – safety for Miami Dolphins
- John Tarver – running back for New England Patriots in 1970s
- Leonard Williams – defensive lineman for Seattle Seahawks
- Dick Witcher – wide receiver for San Francisco 49ers
- Louis Wright – All-Pro defensive back for Denver Broncos, member of 1970s NFL all-decade team
- Rodney Wright – wide receiver for Fresno State and Buffalo Bills

==== Motorsports ====
- Kevin Harvick – NASCAR driver, 2007 Daytona 500 winner and 2014 Sprint Cup Series champion
- Casey Mears – NASCAR driver
- Rick Mears – 4-time Indianapolis 500 winner
- Roger Mears – Baja 1000 winner
- Blaine Perkins – NASCAR driver
- Ryan Reed – NASCAR driver
- Bruce Sarver – NHRA champion
- George Snider – 22-time competitor, Indianapolis 500

==== Boxing ====
- Ruben Castillo – WBO and NABO lightweight champion, WBC featherweight and super featherweight contender
- Michael Dallas, Jr. – Golden Gloves silver medalist, light welterweight contender
- Jerry Quarry – national Golden Gloves champion, heavyweight professional boxer, fought Muhammad Ali and Joe Frazier
- Mike Quarry – light-heavyweight professional boxer

==== Track & field ====
- Lonnie Spurrier – middle-distance runner, Olympian (1956), set world's record in the half-mile run in 1955

==== Soccer ====
- Quincy Amarikwa – forward
- Esteban Arias – defender
- Cami Privett – former NWSL soccer player for the Houston Dash

==== Mixed martial arts ====
- Josh Hokit – mixed martial artist

=== Writers, poets, journalists ===
- Mary Hunter Austin (1868–1934) – writer of prose, married in Bakersfield
- Frank Bidart – poet
- James Chapman – novelist and publisher
- Robert Duncan – poet (lived in Bakersfield 1927–32)
- Georgie Starbuck Galbraith – writer of light verse
- Gerald Haslam – author
- Amber Hollibaugh – writer, filmmaker, activist and organizer
- Lawrence Kimble – Hollywood screenwriter
