= Southeast Yosemite League =

High school athletic league in California

The Southeast Yosemite League is a high school athletic league that is part of the CIF Central Section. The member schools are all public high schools in Bakersfield, California. With a long history, this has been called a power league in the Central Section.

There is a seasonal selection of All League players in the scope of sports administered by the league.

== Members ==
- East Bakersfield High School
- Foothill High School
- Highland High School
- Mira Monte High School
- North High School
- South High School
