= South Yosemite League =

High school athletic league in California

The South Yosemite League is a high school athletic league that is part of the CIF Central Section. With the exception of Bakersfield Christian High School (a private school), the league consists of public high schools in Bakersfield, California.

There is a seasonal selection of All League players in the scope of sports administered by the league.

- Bakersfield Christian High School
- Ridgeview High School
- Golden Valley High School
- Tehachapi High School
- Independence High School
- West High School
