= Frontier High School (Bakersfield, California) =

Public high school in California, United States

Coordinates: 35°25′8″N 119°8′49″W

Location
- 6401 Allen Road; Bakersfield, California 93312; United States

Information
- School type: Public Senior High School
- Motto: "Success for every Student"
- Opened: 2006
- School district: Kern High School District
- Principal: Vicky Thompson
- Staff: 80.30 (FTE)
- Grades: 9-12
- Enrollment: 2,030 (2023-2024)
- Student to teacher ratio: 25.28
- Campus type: Suburban
- Colors: Blue, black and white
- Athletics conference: South Yosemite River League
- Mascot: Titan
- Rival: Centennial High School, Liberty High School, Stockdale High School
- Website: https://frontier.kernhigh.org

Frontier High School (FHS) is a public American high school in Bakersfield, California. The school is part of the Kern High School District since its opening in 2006. Its campus is located on the corner of Allen Road and Olive Drive in Northwest Bakersfield.

== History ==
Frontier High School was founded prior to the 2006–2007 academic year, opening its doors only to incoming freshmen and sophomores. The first day of class was held August 21, 2006. Frontier's first graduating class was the Class of 2009.

The school's newspaper publication, entitled the Titan Tribune, posted stories and events online until 2011. It currently does not run a newspaper.

== Athletics ==
Mike Gibson is the FHS athletic director. FHS sports teams are called the Titans, and have their home games on campus. The Titans participate in the South Yosemite League CIF Central Section and have varsity, junior varsity, and frosh/soph teams. The Titan Girls' golf and soccer teams have won the California Interscholastic Federation championship in both.

The sports FHS participates in, and their respective levels are:

- Varsity, JV & frosh/soph – Football, Volleyball, men's basketball, women's basketball, baseball, softball, cross country
- Varsity and JV – Women's tennis, women's soccer, wrestling, men's tennis, cheerleading, men's soccer, swimming, track and field
- Varsity only – Men's Golf, women's golf, Men's Water Polo, Women's Water Polo
The official mascot for the Frontier Titans.

Alternate logo for the Frontier High School Titans.

== Notable alumni ==
- Matt Darr, punter for the Miami Dolphins
- Logan Gillaspie, Major League Baseball pitcher with the Baltimore Orioles
- Cami Privett, former NWSL soccer player for the Houston Dash
