= Sarver =

Sarver (Jewish: Occupational name for a caterer from Yiddish sarver "one who serves") may refer to:

== People ==
- Bruce Sarver (1962–2005), American drag racer
- Michael Sarver (born 1981), American singer
- Robert Sarver (born 1961), American businessman and majority owner of the Phoenix Suns
- Samuel Sarver (born 2003), American soccer player

== Other uses ==
- Sarver, Pennsylvania, U.S.
- Holt v. Sarver, 1969 U.S. Supreme Court case
- Ned and Sandy Sarver, characters in the Dean Koontz novel Strangers
