= Mira Monte High School =

Location
- 1800 South Fairfax Road; Bakersfield, California 93307; United States; 35.3385°N 118.9339°W

Information
- Type: Public high school
- Established: 2008
- School district: Kern High School District
- Principal: Roman Aguilar
- Grades: 9–12
- Enrollment: 2,170 (2023–2024)
- Colors: Cardinal, gold, and white
- Mascot: Lion
- Nickname: Lions
- Rival: Foothill High School, Arvin High School, Independence High School
- Website: miramonte.kernhigh.org

== Overview ==
Mira Monte High School is a public high school in southeastern Bakersfield, California, United States. Established in 2008, it serves students in grades nine through twelve as part of the Kern High School District. The school's athletic teams are known as the Lions.

== History ==
Mira Monte High School opened on August 18, 2008, for the 2008–2009 academic year. It was one of two Kern High School District high schools to open in August 2008, alongside Independence High School.

=== Planning & Construction ===
Planning for Mira Monte High School began in the mid-2000s as the Kern High School District expanded its facilities to accommodate population growth in Bakersfield. In 2004, district voters approved Measure N, a $219 million general obligation bond measure that financed construction of Mira Monte High School and Independence High School, along with improvements to several existing district campuses.

In preparation for the two new high schools, the district undertook a major revision of attendance boundaries. On March 5, 2007, the district's Board of Trustees unanimously approved a redistricting plan recommended by Superintendent Don Carter. The plan was intended to populate the new campuses and reduce overcrowding at existing schools.

Under the approved plan, Mira Monte's attendance area incorporated portions of the former attendance areas of Golden Valley, West, Arvin, Foothill, Bakersfield and Highland high schools. The boundary changes generated disagreements among parents over neighborhood assignments, school proximity and the distribution of students between campuses.

=== Opening ===
Mira Monte High School officially opened on August 18, 2008, for the 2008–2009 academic year. It opened alongside Independence High School as one of two new comprehensive high schools added to the Kern High School District that year.

=== Campus Development ===
In April 2021, the Kern High School District approved an expansion proposal for an Agricultural Learning Center on approximately 18 acres immediately south of the Mira Monte campus. The proposal included agricultural science classrooms, a poultry barn, animal holding pens, outdoor instructional areas and an exercise arena. According to the environmental review, the proposed facilities were intended to expand vocational education opportunities without increasing overall school enrollment.

=== Public Issues & Student Response ===
In June 2024, an investigation by EdSource, published by LAist, examined police activity at public schools throughout California, including Mira Monte High School. The investigation identified 163 police-call records associated with Mira Monte during a sampled period in the first half of 2023. Reported incidents included alleged assaults, disturbances and other calls for police assistance.

The report included an interview with a Mira Monte student who expressed concerns about the daily presence of school police while also acknowledging their role in responding to campus fights. The broader investigation examined differing perspectives on school policing, student safety and disciplinary practices.

=== Student Demonstrations ===
In 2025, Mira Monte students joined students from other Kern High School District campuses in walkouts protesting federal immigration and education policies. Participants gathered in downtown Bakersfield, including at the Kern County Superior Court, as part of a wider student-led demonstration.

Student activism continued into January 2026, when Mira Monte students participated in additional walkouts addressing immigration enforcement. Local television coverage documented students organizing at the campus before joining a march through Bakersfield. Former Mira Monte student Hector Hernandez was identified in reporting as a co-founder of a youth-led organizing group involved in the demonstrations.

== Athletics ==
=== Girls' soccer ===
In 2023, Mira Monte's girls' soccer team won the CIF Central Section Division V championship and advanced to the CIF Northern California Division IV regional playoffs. The Lions defeated Colfax High School 1–0 in the regional final, finishing the season with a 28–2–3 record and a 15-match winning streak.

=== Football ===
In November 2024, Mira Monte's football team recorded the first playoff victory in program history, defeating Kern Valley High School 56–39 in the CIF Central Section Division VI playoffs. The Lions entered the postseason as the twelfth seed.

=== Boys' soccer ===
In February 2026, the boys' soccer team captured the CIF Central Section Division II championship with a 1–0 victory against Liberty High School of Bakersfield.

The Lions subsequently advanced to the CIF Division II state championship game, becoming the first boys' soccer program from Kern County to reach a CIF state championship final. Mira Monte lost the championship match to San Ramon Valley High School 4–1 on March 13, 2026, at Natomas High School in Sacramento.

=== 2022 Soccer Forfeiture ===
In November 2022, a girls' soccer match between Mira Monte and Granite Hills High School of Porterville ended in a halftime forfeit after questions were raised about the eligibility of a Mira Monte goalkeeper. Mira Monte was leading 1–0 when Granite Hills declined to continue the match. The Bakersfield Californian reported that the objections concerned the goalkeeper's gender identity. The CIF Central Section subsequently confirmed that it had been in contact with both schools regarding the incident.

== Campus ==
The school is located at 1800 South Fairfax Road in southeastern Bakersfield, in Kern County, California.

== Academics ==
Mira Monte High School offers a comprehensive secondary education curriculum and career technical education (CTE) programs. Its CTE pathways include agricultural mechanics, agricultural science, engineering design, information support services, and computer networking.

The school participates in dual enrollment opportunities with Bakersfield College, allowing students to take college-level courses in subjects including English, history, agriculture, Spanish, and career planning.

Mira Monte is accredited by the Western Association of Schools and Colleges, with an accreditation term extending through 2031.

== Demographics ==
According to the California Department of Education, Mira Monte High School enrolled 2,025 students during the 2025–2026 school year. Of those students, 364 (18.0%) were classified as English language learners.

== Student activities ==
Mira Monte has an Associated Student Body (ASB) organization that coordinates student representation, school events, and extracurricular activities.

The school's agricultural education program also participates in FFA activities, including public speaking competitions.
