= Carl Jones Jr. =

American football player (born 2001)

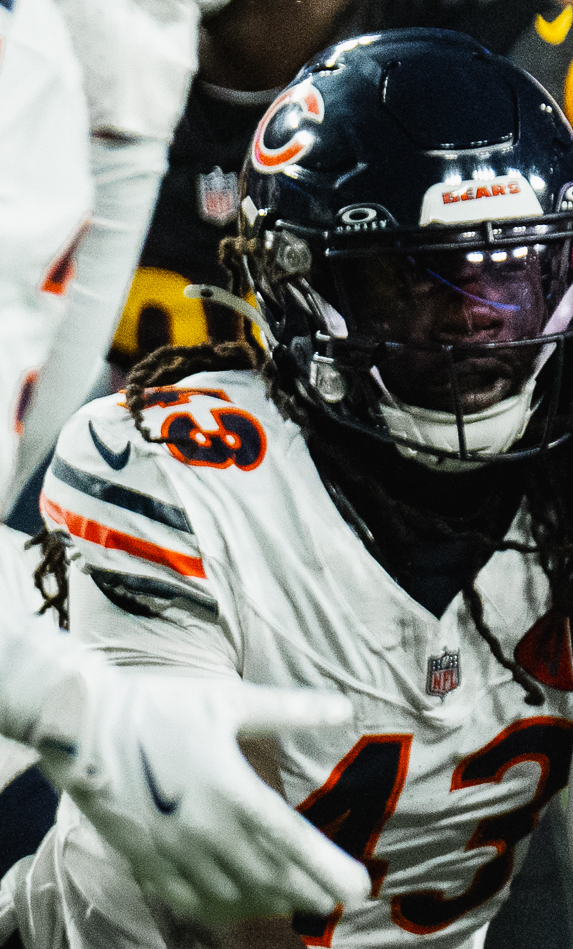
- Jones with the Chicago Bears in 2025

No. 48 – Baltimore Ravens
- Position: Linebacker
- Roster status: Practice squad

Personal information
- Born: August 8, 2001 (age 25); Bakersfield, California, U.S.
- Listed height: 6 ft 0 in (1.83 m)
- Listed weight: 223 lb (101 kg)

Career information
- High school: Golden Valley (Bakersfield, California); Bakersfield (Bakersfield, California)
- College: UCLA (2019–2023)
- NFL draft: 2024: undrafted

Career history
- Chicago Bears (2024–2025); Baltimore Ravens (2025–present)

Career NFL statistics as of 2025
- Total tackles: 12
- Stats at Pro Football Reference

Carl Jones Jr. (born August 8, 2001) is an American professional football linebacker for the Baltimore Ravens of the National Football League (NFL). He played college football for the UCLA Bruins.

== Early life ==
Jones was born on August 8, 2001, in Bakersfield, California. He attended Golden Valley High School before transferring to Bakersfield High School. In high school, he participated in football, basketball and track and field. He played quarterback as a junior, throwing for seven touchdowns and running for 556 yards and six touchdowns, and as a senior he ran for 296 yards and six touchdowns, caught 24 receptions for 589 yards and seven touchdowns, and made 66 tackles on defense. A three-star recruit, he committed to play college football for the UCLA Bruins.

== College career ==
At UCLA, Jones transitioned from being a safety in high school to a linebacker, also seeing time as an edge rusher. As a freshman at UCLA in 2019, he appeared in all 12 games, two as a starter, and finished with 24 tackles. He played all seven games in 2020, finishing with 21 tackles, played in all 12 games in 2021, then appeared in all 13 games in 2022, totaling 28 tackles, with most of his action being as a reserve in those years. As a senior in 2023, Jones appeared in all 13 games, four as a starter, and finished with 31 tackles and two sacks. He concluded his collegiate career having made 135 tackles, 23.0 tackles-for-loss (TFLs) and eight sacks.

== Professional career ==
Pre-draft measurables
Height	Weight	Arm length	Hand span	Wingspan	40-yard dash	10-yard split	20-yard split	20-yard shuttle	Three-cone drill	Vertical jump	Broad jump	Bench press
5 ft 11 3/4 in (1.82 m)	219 lb (99 kg)	31 3/8 in (0.80 m)	9 in (0.23 m)	6 ft 4 1/2 in (1.94 m)	4.52 s	1.62 s	2.63 s	4.52 s	7.15 s	34.0 in (0.86 m)	10 ft 3 in (3.12 m)	22 reps
All values from Pro Day

=== Chicago Bears ===
After going unselected in the 2024 NFL draft, Jones signed with the Chicago Bears as an undrafted free agent. He was waived on August 27, 2024, then re-signed to the practice squad the following day. Jones was elevated to the active roster on November 9, for the team's Week 10 game against the New England Patriots, and made his NFL debut in the game, appearing on 12 special teams snaps. He signed a reserve/future contract with the Bears on January 6, 2025.

On August 28, 2025, Jones was waived by the Bears and re-signed to the practice squad three days later. He was promoted to the active roster on September 27. Jones was released on November 6 and re-signed to the practice squad two days later. He was signed to the active roster on November 22. On December 6, Jones was waived by the Bears.

=== Baltimore Ravens ===
On December 8, 2025, Jones was claimed off waivers by the Baltimore Ravens.

On August 30, 2026, Jones was waived by the Ravens as a part of final roster cuts; he was re-signed to the team's practice squad the next day. He was promoted to the active roster on September 19. On September 29, he was waived and re-signed to the practice squad two days later. On October 17, he was re-signed to the active roster. He was released on October 21, then signed to their practice squad the next day.
