= Ridgeview High School (Bakersfield, California) =

Coordinates: 35°16′42″N 119°03′30″W

Location
- 8501 Stine Road; Bakersfield, California 93313; United States

Information
- School type: Public
- Motto: P.A.C.K.: Practice respect – Act responsibly – Consider others – Keep our school safe
- Established: 1994
- Founder: George H. Ridgeview
- School district: Kern High School District
- Principal: Roger Sanchez
- Staff: 101.47 (FTE)
- Grades: 9-12
- Enrollment: 2,653 (2023-2024)
- Student to teacher ratio: 26.15
- Campus type: Suburban
- Colors: Purple,Gold,White
- Athletics conference: South Yosemite Valley League
- Mascot: Wolf Pack
- Rival: Golden Valley High School, Independence High School, West High School
- Feeder schools: Stonecreek JH
- Website: http://ridgeview.kernhigh.org/

Ridgeview High School (RHS) was founded in 1994.

== Academics ==
All students enrolled at RHS must at least meet the following criteria before graduation:

- 4 years of English (40 credits)
- 3 years of Social Studies (30 credits)
  - 1 year of World History
  - 1 year of U.S. History
  - 1 year of U.S. Government/Economics
- 2 years of Math (20 credits)
  - All students must pass Algebra or an approved sequence of courses covering the Algebra standard (Ed. Code 51224.5) in grades 7–12.
- 2 years of Science. (20 credits)
  - 1 year of Physical Science
  - 1 year of Biological Science
- 2 years of P.E. (20 credits)
- 2 year of Foreign Language/Fine Arts (20 credits)
- 1 semester of Health (5 credits)
- 70 credits of electives

In total, 220 credits are necessary for a student at RHS to graduate. Also, every student who graduates must pass the CAHSEE and an approved Algebra course.

Furthermore, RHS offers the following AP courses, which students can take to earn college credit, pass an SAT II exam, or be academically challenged:

- AP Biology
- AP Calculus AB
- AP English Literature and Composition
- AP Spanish Language
- AP Statistics
- AP U.S. Government
- AP United States History
- AP World History

RHS also participates in the national We the People: The Citizen and the Constitution program in the 23rd Congressional District. Their coach is Jason Jenkins. In 2018, RHS's Unit 1 won the school's first-ever first place ranking in the program. Ridgeview's We the People units also coordinate with those from West, coached by Angela Jenkins.

== Athletics ==
The athletic director for RHS is Brad Harris. RHS sports teams are called the Wolf Pack, and have their home games on campus. The Wolf Pack participate in the South Yosemite Valley League and have varsity, JV and Frosh/Soph teams. Below are all the sports that RHS participates in and their respective season:

Fall

- Cross Country
- Football*
- Women's Golf
- Women's Tennis
- Women's Volleyball
- Cheerleading
- Men's Water Polo
- Women's Water Polo

Winter

- Men's Basketball
- Men's Soccer
- Women's Basketball
- Women's Soccer
- Wrestling
- Cheerleading

Spring

- Baseball
- Track and Field
- Men's Golf
- Men's Tennis
- Softball
- Swimming
- Cheerleading

== Notable alumni ==
- Bryson Keeton - NFL cornerback
- Erica McCall - WNBA center
- Kamari Cotton-Moya - NFL defensive back
- Rodney Leisle -NFL
- Kyrie Wilson - NFL

== Performing Arts Program ==
The drama program has won various awards for its Drama Performance (DP) class at local and regional competitions. In 2018, a group of students won first place for their ensemble Shakespeare scene (the induction scene from The Taming of the Shrew) at the Bakersfield College Shakespeare Festival. That same year, their Small Group Comedy scene (10 Reasons You Should Have Stayed Home Sick Today) won fourth place and their Large Group Comedy scene won third place at the DTASC fall festival. The drama department also hosts Bakersfield's original annual Dance Revue.
