= Colton Schmidt =

American football player (born 1990)

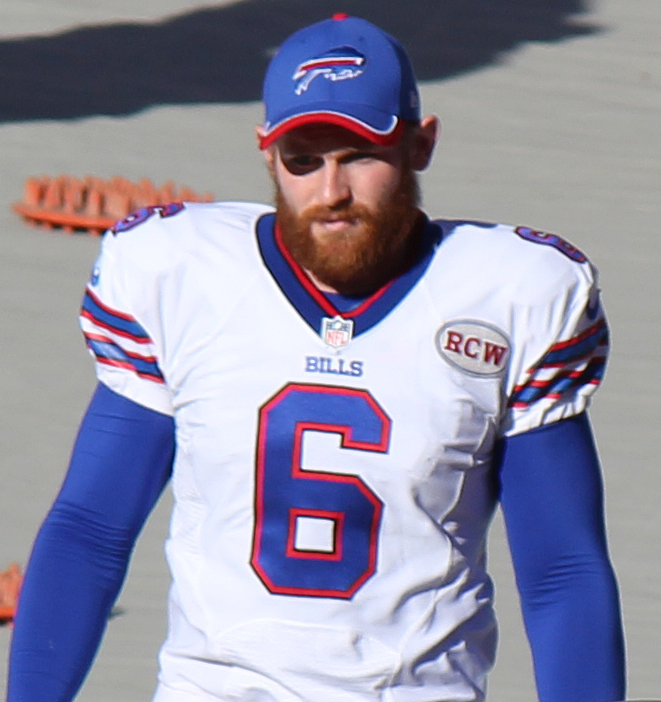
- Schmidt with the Buffalo Bills in 2014

No. 6
- Position: Punter

Personal information
- Born: October 27, 1990 (age 36); Bakersfield, California, U.S.
- Listed height: 5 ft 11 in (1.80 m)
- Listed weight: 218 lb (99 kg)

Career information
- High school: Liberty (Bakersfield)
- College: UC Davis
- NFL draft: 2013: undrafted

Career history
- San Francisco 49ers (2013)*; Cleveland Browns (2013)*; San Francisco 49ers (2014)*; Buffalo Bills (2014–2018); Birmingham Iron (2019); Los Angeles Wildcats (2020)
- * Offseason or practice squad member only

Career NFL statistics
- Punts: 338
- Punt yards: 14,882
- Punt average: 44.0
- Longest punt: 67
- Inside 20: 105
- Stats at Pro Football Reference

Colton Schmidt (born October 27, 1990) is an American former professional football player who was a punter for five seasons with the Buffalo Bills of the National Football League (NFL) from 2014 to 2018. He played college football for the UC Davis Aggies before signing with the San Francisco 49ers as an undrafted free agent in 2013.

Schmidt was cut by the 49ers during the 2013 preseason and was soon signed by the Cleveland Browns, but was cut again before the start of the regular season. He had another offseason stint with the 49ers in 2014 before signing with the Bills prior to the start of the regular season. After being released by the Bills in 2018, Schmidt spent the next two years with the Birmingham Iron of the Alliance of American Football (AAF) and the Los Angeles Wildcats of the XFL, respectively.

== Professional career ==
=== San Francisco 49ers (first stint) ===
Schmidt signed with the San Francisco 49ers as an undrafted free agent, following the 2013 NFL draft, on July 15, 2013. He was waived on August 2, but re-signed with the team on a three-year contract four days later. He was cut by the team after the third preseason game of 2013.

=== Cleveland Browns ===
Schmidt was claimed off waivers by the Cleveland Browns. He did not make the roster and was waived by the team during final roster cuts.

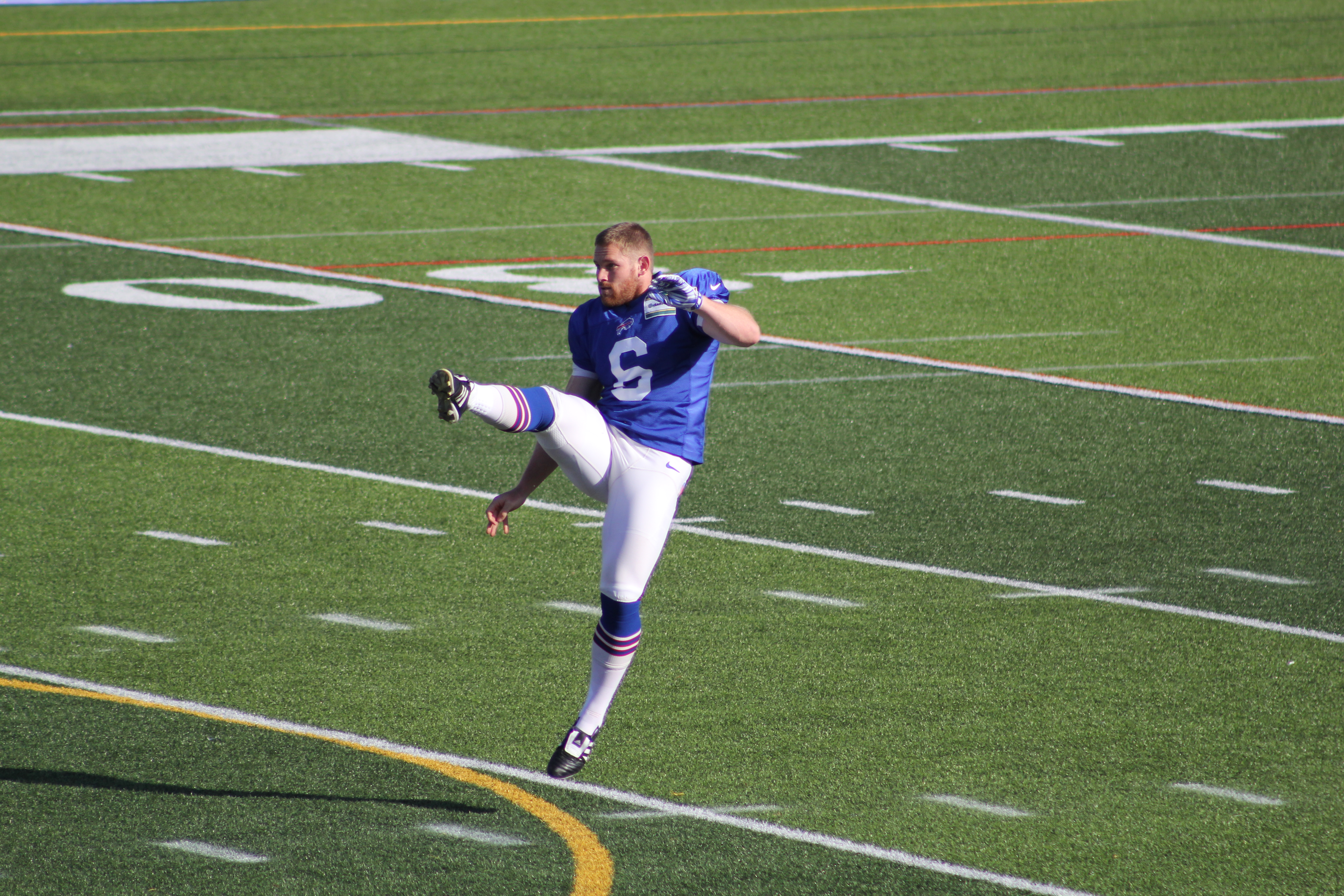
Schmidt with the Bills in 2015

=== San Francisco 49ers (second stint) ===
Schmidt was signed by the 49ers for the second time on January 7, 2014. He was released by the team on August 26, 2014.

=== Buffalo Bills ===
On August 30, 2014, Schmidt was signed by the Buffalo Bills. Schmidt was signed to handle punting duties, while Jordan Gay was signed as a kickoff specialist.

On January 4, 2016, the Bills signed Schmidt to a contract extension.

After initially not being tendered an offer as a restricted free agent after the 2016 season, on March 8, 2017, Schmidt re-signed with the Bills.

On September 2, 2018, Schmidt was released by the Bills after the team claimed Corey Bojorquez off waivers. He was re-signed by the Bills on October 31 after Bojorquez was placed on injured reserve. On November 27, 2018, the Bills released Schmidt again to sign Matt Darr.

=== Birmingham Iron ===
Schmidt signed with the Birmingham Iron of the Alliance of American Football on January 9, 2019. After a week 3 game against the Atlanta Legends where he averaged 49.2 gross yards on 5 punts, Schmidt was named the AAF special teams player of the week. The league ceased operations in April 2019.

=== Los Angeles Wildcats ===
In October 2019, Schmidt was selected by the Los Angeles Wildcats in the 2020 XFL draft's open phase. He was placed on injured reserve before the start of the regular season on February 6, 2020. He had his contract terminated when the league suspended operations on April 10, 2020.

== NFL career statistics ==
Legend
**Bold**	Career high

=== Regular season ===
Year	Team	Punting									
Year	Team	GP	Punts	Yds	Net Yds	Lng	Avg	Net Avg	Blk	Ins20	TB
2014	BUF	**16**	**86**	3,692	3,326	**67**	42.9	38.7	0	**31**	**6**
2015	BUF	**16**	82	**3,802**	**3,384**	65	**46.4**	**41.3**	0	22	3
2016	BUF	**16**	75	3,183	2,861	58	42.4	38.1	0	20	3
2017	BUF	**16**	79	3,529	3,199	60	44.7	40.5	0	28	**6**
2018	BUF	3	16	676	540	55	42.3	33.8	0	4	2
Career		67	338	14,882	13,310	67	44.0	39.4	0	105	20

=== Playoffs ===
Year	Team	Punting									
Year	Team	GP	Punts	Yds	Net Yds	Lng	Avg	Net Avg	Blk	Ins20	TB
2017	BUF	**1**	**8**	**347**	**325**	**55**	**43.4**	**40.6**	0	**5**	0
Career		1	8	347	325	55	43.4	40.6	0	5	0
