= Bakersfield High School =

Location
- 1241 G Street; Bakersfield, California 93301; United States; 35°22′09″N 119°01′22″W

Information
- School type: Public; Secondary
- Established: 1893
- School district: Kern High School District
- Principal: Ryan Geivet
- Teaching staff: 120.91 (FTE)
- Grades: 9–12
- Gender: Coed
- Enrollment: 3,024 (2023-2024)
- Student to teacher ratio: 25.01
- Colors: Navy, white, and gray
- Athletics conference: South Yosemite Valley League; CIF Central Section
- Nickname: Drillers
- Rivals: Garces Memorial High School, Liberty High School, Centennial High School
- Newspaper: Blue and White
- Yearbook: Oracle
- Website: bakersfield.kernhigh.org

Bakersfield High School (BHS) is a public four-year high school located in Bakersfield, California, United States. Opened in 1893, Bakersfield High School serves grades ninth through twelfth within the Kern High School District.

== Notable alumni ==
- Larry Barnes – former MLB player (Anaheim Angels, Los Angeles Dodgers).
- Theo Bell – former NFL football player
- Richard Blick - 1960 Rome Olympic 4x200 freestyle relay gold medalist, 200-meter freestyle world record-holder, teacher, principal, and swim coach.
- Jeff Buckey – former NFL football player
- Pete Cross – former NBA player.
- Marion Osborn Cunningham – artist.
- Ric Drasin – actor, author, designer of the Gold's Gym and World Gym logos, and retired professional wrestler
- Robert Duncan – poet, was a key figure in the San Francisco Renaissance
- Frank Gifford – Pro Football Hall of Fame and Monday Night Football commentator
- Merle Haggard – singer-songwriter.
- Carl Jones Jr. – NFL linebacker for the Chicago Bears
- Jerry Marion – former NFL player
- Kevin McCarthy – Congressman, 55th Speaker of the United States House of Representatives
- Matthew Todd Miller, American citizen held by North Korea
- Spain Musgrove – former NFL defensive lineman
- Doug Loman – former MLB player (Milwaukee Brewers)
- Ruth B. Love (Class of 1950) – Educator, former education administrator, school superintendent and author. Love is noted as the first African–American and woman to serve as superintendent of Chicago Public Schools, the nation's third largest school district.
- Steve Ontiveros – former MLB player (San Francisco Giants, Chicago Cubs)
- Dennis Ralston – Davis Cup winner
- Don Robesky – former Stanford football player
- Rick Sawyer – former MLB player (New York Yankees, San Diego Padres)
- Jeff Siemon – former NFL football player
- Jeremy Staat – former NFL player
- Michael Stewart – former NFL football player
- Robert Swift (Class of 2004) – former NBA player
- Jerry Tarr – former professional football player
- Phillip Thomas – former NFL football player
- Jake Varner – four time All-American and two time national champion wrestler at Iowa State University and winner of a gold medal at the 2012 Olympic Games in London at 26
- Tyrone Wallace (Class of 2012) – Paris basketball player, NBA player, former California Golden Bears basketball player
- Earl Warren – California Attorney General, three-term Governor of California, Chief Justice of the United States, and chairman of the Warren Commission
- Larry Welz – noteworthy early contributor to underground comics movement
