= Kern Valley High School =

Public high school in Lake Isabella, California

Location
- 3340 Erskine Creek Road; Lake Isabella, Kern County, CA 93240; United States
- Coordinates: 35°36′29″N 118°27′53″W

Information
- School type: Public High School
- Established: 1941
- School district: Kern High School District
- Superintendent: Bryon Schaefer, Ed.D.
- Principal: Alan Paradise
- Staff: 29.13 (FTE)
- Grades: 9–12
- Enrollment: 484 (2023-2024)
- Student to teacher ratio: 16.62
- Language: English; Spanish
- Color
- Mascot: The Bronc
- Information: +1 (760) 379-2611
- Website: https://kernvalley.kernhigh.org/

Kern Valley High School is a small high school located in Lake Isabella, California, and is one of the comprehensive high schools in the Kern High School District. The school has a staff of approximately 80 teachers and support staff, and a student population of about 500.

== History ==
In 1941, before a school was built in the Kern River Valley, students were bussed to Bakersfield where they stayed in dormitories during the week, and returned home on the week-ends. Kernville High School opened its doors to 20 students.

In 1951, when the Lake Isabella Dam was constructed and the resulting reservoir would have covered the school, it was moved to the town of Lake Isabella and renamed Kern Valley High School. As the student population continued to grow, additional classrooms and a gymnasium were constructed. A new school cafeteria was added, an industrial arts complex was constructed, and permanent "portable" classrooms were installed. The school was named a California Distinguished school in 2006–07 school year.

== Elective classes ==
Kern Valley High School offers a number of elective classes in addition to the normal required curriculum. They offer classes such as:

- Beginning and Intermediate Choir
- Beginning and Intermediate Band
- Yearbook
- Home Economics
- Foods Lab
- Floral
- Several Agricultural classes
