= Kern High School District =

School district in California, United States

Location
- Kern County, California United States

District information
- Type: Public school district
- Motto: Tradition of Excellence
- Grades: 9-12
- Established: 1893
- Superintendent: Michael Zulfa
- Schools: 31
- Budget: $420MM (2021-2022)

Students and staff
- Students: 42,683 (2021-2022)
- Staff: 1,761 (on FTEbasis)
- Student–teacher ratio: 24.33 (on FTE basis)

Other information
- Website: Kern High School District

The Kern High School District (KHSD) is a public high school system headquartered in Bakersfield, California that serves portions of the County of Kern located at the southern end of the San Joaquin Valley. As of 2023, the Kern High School District serves over 43,000 students and 3,600 employees as of 2007. It encompasses over 3,500 square miles (9,100 km^{2}), just under 43 percent of the total area of Kern County. It is the largest district of its type by enrollment and land area. Voted into existence in 1892, it began operation in January 1893. The district comprises 19 comprehensive campuses, six alternative education campuses, two career technical education sites, and four special education centers.

The district claims it is the largest provider of entertainment in Kern County, provides the most meals of any organization in the County, and operates one the largest transportation networks.

== Schools ==
| School | Grades | Enrollment (2022-2023) | Opened |
|---|---|---|---|
| Arvin High School | 9–12 | 2,786 | 1949 |
| Bakersfield Adult School | N/A | | Before 1939[1] |
| Bakersfield High School | 9–12 | 3,004 | 1893 |
| Centennial High School | 9–12 | 2,175 | 1993 |
| Central Valley High School | 10–12 | 89 | 1971 |
| Del Oro High School | 9–12 | 873 | 2022 |
| East Bakersfield High School | 9–12 | 2,312 | 1938 |
| Foothill High School | 9–12 | 2,045 | 1961 |
| Frontier High School | 9–12 | 2,072 | 2006 |
| Golden Valley High School | 9–12 | 2,533 | 2003 |
| Independence High School | 9–12 | 2,394 | 2008 |
| Highland High School | 9–12 | 2,599 | 1970 |
| Liberty High School | 9–12 | 2,358 | 1999 |
| Kern Valley High School | 9–12 | 466 | 1941 |
| Journey Career Center | 11–12 | | 2022 |
| Mira Monte High School | 9–12 | 2,293 | 2008 |
| North High School | 9–12 | 2,214 | 1953 |
| Nueva Continuation High School | 9–12 | 109 | 1970 |
| Ridgeview High School | 9–12 | 2,688 | 1994 |
| Shafter High School | 9–12 | 1,651 | 1928 |
| South High School | 9–12 | 2,176 | 1957 |
| Stockdale High School | 9–12 | 2,298 | 1991 |
| Summit Continuation High School | 10–12 | | 1985 |
| Vista Continuation High School | 10–12 | 242 | 1967 |
| Vista West Continuation High School | 10–12 | 312 | 1986 |
| West High School | 9–12 | 2,025 | 1965 |
