= Golden Valley High School (Bakersfield, California) =

Location
- 801 Hosking Avenue; Bakersfield, California 93307; United States; 35°16′48″N 119°00′33″W

Information
- School type: Public
- Opened: 2003
- School district: Kern High School District
- Principal: Paul Helman
- Teaching staff: 95.69 (FTE)
- Grades: 9-12
- Enrollment: 2,228 (2024-2025)
- Student to teacher ratio: 23.28
- Campus type: Suburban
- Colors: Blue and Gold
- Athletics conference: South Yosemite Horizon League
- Nickname: Bulldogs
- Rivals: Ridgeview High School, South High School, West High School
- Accreditation: Western Association of Schools and Colleges
- Yearbook: The Golden Age
- Feeder schools: McKee Middle School, Olivier Middle School, Greenfield Middle School
- Website: GVHS website

Golden Valley High School (abbr. GVHS) is a public American senior high school set in Bakersfield, California. The school is part of the Kern High School District. Its campus is located on the corner of Hosking Avenue and Monitor Street/Shannon Drive.

== History ==
Golden Valley High School was founded in 2003 and opened on August 18, 2003. Tani G. Cantil-Sakauye, the 28th Chief Justice of California, visited Golden Valley High School on May 17, 2013 to present Golden Valley High School with the "Civic Learning Award of Excellence."

== Academics ==
GVHS offers the following AP, and Honors courses, which students can take to earn college credit via the AP program, pass an SAT exam, or be academically challenged to prepare for college:

- AP English Language and Composition
- AP English Literature and Composition
- Honors French
- AP Spanish Language and Culture
- Honors Chemistry
- AP Biology
- AP Spanish Literature and Culture
- AP United States History
- AP Physics
- We the People (Honors Government)
- AP Government
- AP European History
- Honors Anatomy and Physiology
- Honors Spanish
- AP Calculus AB
- AP Statistics
- Honors Math Analysis

== Athletics ==
Below are all the sports that GVHS participates in and their respective season: Fall

- Cross Country
- Football
- Women's Golf
- Women's Tennis
- Women's Volleyball

Winter

- Men's Basketball
- Men's Soccer
- Women's Basketball
- Women's Soccer
- Wrestling

Spring

- Baseball
- Men's Golf
- Men's Tennis
- Softball
- Swimming
- Track and Field
