= Kamari Cotton-Moya =

American football player (born 1994)

Current position
- Title: Head Coach
- Team: Denison-Schleswig Monarchs
- Conference: Hawkeye 10
- Record: 7-11

Biographical details
- Born: December 11, 1994 (age 31); Bakersfield, California

Playing career
- 2014-2017: Iowa State
- 2018: Arizona Hotshots
- Position: Defensive back

Coaching career (HC unless noted)
- 2021-Present: Denison-Schleswig HS (IA)

Head coaching record
- Overall: 7-11

Accomplishments and honors

Awards
- First-team All-Big 12 (2017); Second-team All-Big 12 (2016); First-team Freshman All-American- FWAA (2014); Big 12 Defensive Freshman of the Year (2014)

Kamari Cotton-Moya (born December 11, 1994) is an American former football defensive back. His accolades during his college career include 2017 First-team All-Big 12, 2016 Second-team All-Big 12, and Big 12 Defensive Freshman of the Year in 2014.

== High school career ==
At Ridgeview High School Cotton-Moya was a two-way star on the football field, he started both as quarterback and defensive back for the Wolfpack. His junior season Cotton-Moya rushed for 1,580 yards and 13 touchdowns as well as throwing for 464 yards and six touchdowns. The following year en route to a Central Section Division III Championship he rushed for 2,258 yards and 27 touchdowns in addition to passing for 1,580 yards and 13 touchdowns.

=== Recruiting ===
Despite excelling at multiple positions, Cotton-Moya was only lightly recruited as an athlete out of high school. He ultimately committed to Iowa State over Fresno State, Nevada, and Utah State.

College recruiting
Name	Hometown	School	Height	Weight	Commit date
Kamari Cotton-Moya; ATH	Bakersfield, California	Ridgeview	6 ft 1 in (1.85 m)	180 lb (82 kg)	Jan 20, 2013
Kamari Cotton-Moya; ATH	Recruit ratings: Scout: Rivals: 247Sports: (78)				
Overall recruit ranking: 247Sports: 1,637, 186 (CA), 186 (ATH) ESPN: 69 (CA), 79 (ATH)
Note: In many cases, Scout, Rivals, 247Sports, On3, and ESPN may conflict in their listings of height and weight.; In these cases, the average was taken. ESPN grades are on a 100-point scale.; Sources: "2013 Iowa State Football Commitment List". Rivals.; "2013 Iowa State Football Commits". Scout.; "ESPN". ESPN.; "Scout.com Team Recruiting Rankings". Scout.; "2013 Team Ranking". Rivals.com.

== College career ==
=== 2014 season ===
After redshirting his initial college season Cotton-Moya made his debut in 2014, he started 11 of the 12 games he played in. He led the Cyclones in tackles with 77 and was third on the team with seven passes defended. His 77 tackles rank sixth best for an ISU freshman. His season highlights were 12 tackles and a tackle for loss against Toledo, another 12 tackles against Kansas, and seven tackles plus a recovered fumble against West Virginia.

At the conclusion of the season Cotton-Moya was named the Big 12 Defensive Freshman of the Year as well as a First-team Freshman All-American by the FWAA.

=== 2015 season ===
In 2015 Kamari was on pace for an even better season than his last but it was cut short by a season ending hamstring injury after six games. He finished the season with 40 recorded tackles as three tackles for a loss. Against UNI Cotton-Moya made eight tackles and he had a season high of nine tackles against both Iowa and TCU.

=== 2016 season ===
In 2016 while serving as co-captain, Cotton-Moya built upon the success of his freshman campaign. He was third on the team with 73 tackles and led the team in solo tackles with 58, ranking sixth in the Big 12 and 27th in FBS. Additionally he led the team in takeaways with two interceptions, two fumble recoveries, and a forced fumble. He had 11 tackle games against both UNI and San Jose State. He earned Big 12 Defensive Player of the Week against Texas Tech for making six tackles, forcing a fumble, recovering a fumble, and a 48-yard pick 6.

Cotton-Moya was named to the second-team All-Big 12 (2016) at the end of the season.

=== 2017 season ===
Serving again in 2017 as a team captain, Cotton-Moya once again anchored the Cyclone defense. He finished the season with 60 tackles, three for a loss, three interceptions, and one touchdown. His three interceptions were good for fifth best in the Big 12. He opened the season against UNI with three tackles and his second career pick 6. He followed that up with interceptions against Iowa and Texas and eight solo tackles against Oklahoma State.

At the conclusion of the season he was named a consensus first-team All-Big 12 player.

=== College statistics ===
Year	Team	Games		Tackles				Interceptions					Fumbles	
Year	Team	G	GS	Comb	Solo	Ast	TFL	PD	Int	Yds	Avg	TD	FF	FR
2014	Iowa State	12	11	63	45	18	1.5	7	0	0	0.0	0	0	1
2015	Iowa State	6	6	40	26	14	3.0	1	0	0	0.0.	0	0	0
2016	Iowa State	11	10	73	58	15	2.0	5	2	48	24.0	1	1	1
2017	Iowa State	11	11	60	39	21	3.0	2	3	54	18.0	1	0	0
College totals		40	38	236	168	68	9.5	15	5	102	20.4	2	1	2

== Professional career ==
In 2018, Cotton-Moya signed with the Arizona Hotshots of the Alliance of American Football for the 2019 season. He was placed on injured reserve after suffering a season-ending injury to his right knee. The league ceased operations in April 2019.

== Personal life ==
Kamari's cousin, Sheldon Croney Jr, also played at Iowa State. Kamari contemplated quitting 3 times from Iowa State football program but was able to stick it out. He has a daughter.
