= Justin Berry =

American ex-child pornographer

- Born: July 24, 1986; Bakersfield, California, U.S.
- Disappeared: August 21, 2018 (aged 32); Mexico
- Status: Missing for 8 years, 2 months and 17 days
- Education: Stockdale High School
- Occupations: Former webcam and child pornographer

Justin Berry (born July 24, 1986 – disappeared August 21, 2018) is a man known for operating pornographic websites, beginning at age 13, featuring himself and other teen males. In 2005, at the age of 18, he cooperated in a New York Times feature article. Before publication, Berry was granted immunity from prosecution in exchange for his help in prosecuting other men involved with his websites. After the story broke, Berry was called to testify before a Congressional committee. Berry made media appearances between 2005 and 2007.

== Early life and education ==
Justin Berry is the son of Knute Marvin Berry and Karen Page. Berry grew up in Bakersfield, California. He attended the Art Institute of Dallas in Dallas, Texas. He lived in Mexico with his Spanish-speaking father, who ran a massage parlor in Mazatlán, for a time.

== Eichenwald and The New York Times ==
In June 2005, The New York Times reporter Kurt Eichenwald discovered Berry via a post made by Berry to a Yahoo! message board for his fans. Eichenwald contacted Berry anonymously online, telling Berry he was a songwriter and asking to meet with him. Despite concerns that the anonymous contact might be a law enforcement officer, Berry accepted a payment of $2,000 from Eichenwald on June 8, 2005, before agreeing to the meeting. However per the Times policy of not paying subjects for interviews, Eichenwald told Berry to return the $2000, forcing Berry to seek assistance from a family member to help pay it back.

At the meeting, Eichenwald identified himself as a reporter and explained the true nature of his interest in Berry. Although Berry continued in the Internet pornography business after their initial meeting, in subsequent meetings, Eichenwald was able to gain Berry's confidence and an entry into his world.

Eichenwald requested demonstrations of the workings of Berry's online business which Berry provided, including live conversations with subscribers. After Berry revealed the identities of children who were being exploited by adults, Eichenwald persuaded him to discontinue the business and turn his information about those minors over to the authorities.

Eichenwald completed his research and writing, and, on December 19, 2005, The New York Times published "Through His Webcam, A Boy Joins A Sordid Online World", a feature-length story focusing on Berry's experiences as a "target" for "online pedophiles".

== Interviews and Congressional testimony ==
Berry appeared with Eichenwald on the February 15, 2006, episode of The Oprah Winfrey Show to discuss his story.

On April 4, 2006, Justin Berry appeared before the Subcommittee on Oversight and Investigations of the United States House Committee on Energy and Commerce to give testimony on "Sexual Exploitation of Children Over the Internet: What Parents, Kids and Congress Need to Know About Child Predators." In this testimony he stated that "My experience is not as isolated as you might hope." and went on to detail his ordeal. He expressed frustration that more was not being done to bring the perpetrators to justice, specifically those who molested him. Members of the committee said his testimony had fueled a new effort to toughen up the laws against the producers and purchasers of child pornography. They also praised his courage in stepping forward, with one Congressman going so far as to suggest that any new legislation that emerged from this new effort to combat child pornography be named "the Justin Berry Act."

== Media appearances ==
Berry, Eichenwald and Gourlay appeared on C-SPAN, giving testimony before the Oversight and Investigations Subcommittee of the United States House Committee on Energy and Commerce. Berry and Eichenwald were interviewed on Larry King Live by host Larry King on April 4, 2006.

On May 9, 2006, the NBC television series Law & Order: Special Victims Unit aired an episode called "Web" that bears similarities to Berry's story.

On October 25, 2006, Berry, and Eichenwald appeared on a blog interview called The Darkness to Light Show: Breaking the Conspiracy of Silence.

He was on the May 23, 2012, episode of the Dr. Phil Show called "Behind the Lens: Child Pornography".

== Disappearance ==
Justin Berry disappeared in Mexico on August 21, 2018, when he was 32 years old.
