= Ryan Mathews (American football) =

American football player (born 1987)

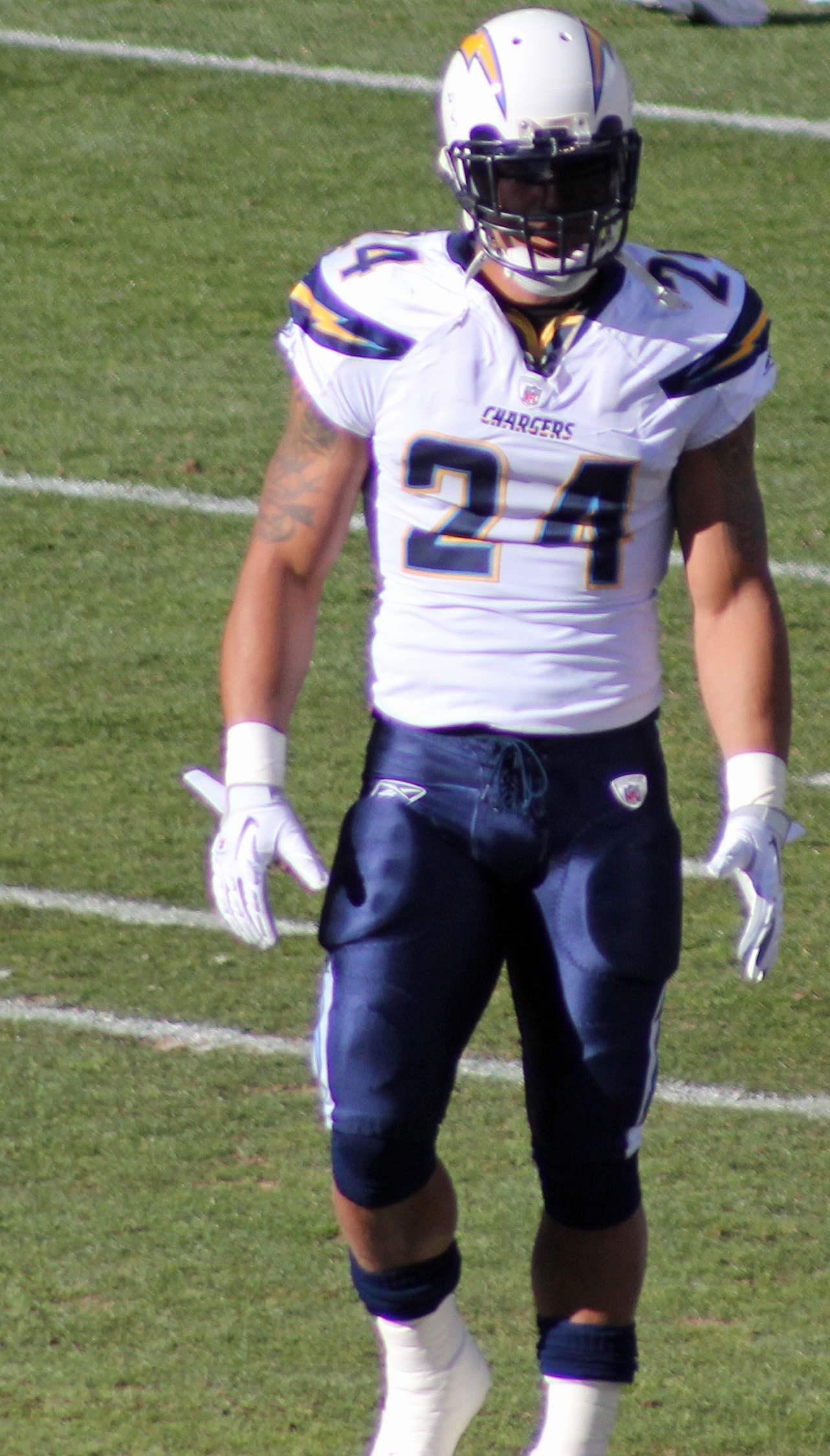
- Mathews with the San Diego Chargers in 2011

No. 24
- Position: Running back

Personal information
- Born: October 10, 1987 (age 39); Riverside, California, U.S.
- Listed height: 6 ft 0 in (1.83 m)
- Listed weight: 220 lb (100 kg)

Career information
- High school: West (Bakersfield, California)
- College: Fresno State (2007–2009)
- NFL draft: 2010: 1st round, 12th overall pick

Career history
- San Diego Chargers (2010–2014); Philadelphia Eagles (2015–2016)

Awards and highlights
- Pro Bowl (2011); Second-team All-American (2009); First-team All-WAC (2009)

Career NFL statistics
- Rushing yards: 5,261
- Rushing average: 4.4
- Rushing touchdowns: 37
- Receptions: 179
- Receiving yards: 1,371
- Receiving touchdowns: 3
- Stats at Pro Football Reference

Ryan Jefforey Mathews (born October 10, 1987) is an American former professional football player who was a running back in the National Football League (NFL). He played college football for the Fresno State Bulldogs, earning second-team All-American honors in 2009. Mathews was selected by the San Diego Chargers in the first round of the 2010 NFL draft with the 12th overall pick. He was named to the Pro Bowl in 2011. He also played for the Philadelphia Eagles.

== Early life ==
Mathews was born in Riverside, California, to Tricia Mathews, when she was 16. His father left before he was born and Ryan has only seen him a few times in his life. For the first four months of his life, Mathews and his mother lived out of her 1969 Oldsmobile. His mother is Caucasian and his father is African-American.

As a child, he and his mother moved to Tehachapi, a small city 35 miles southeast of Bakersfield, to be closer to family. Once there, she took on several jobs to provide a decent life for her son.

He began playing football at age five, and his mother Tricia never missed a game.

After junior high school, he moved to Bakersfield to face tougher athletic competition. Mathews attended West High School in Bakersfield, California, where he played football and ran track. He played running back, quarterback, and linebacker for the Vikings football team. As a junior, he led West High to a CIF championship while rushing for 1,104 yards and 18 touchdowns on offense and totaling 97 tackles and 16 sacks on defense. Following the season, he was an All-State underclass selection. As a senior, Mathews led the nation with 3,396 rushing yards (9.97 yards per attempt) and 44 touchdowns as a running back, along with 851 passing yards and 11 touchdowns as a quarterback. After his senior season, he was named first team All-State and a second team All-American. In track & field, Mathews competed in hurdles (personal-best of 15.99 in the 110m hurdles) and relays (43.13 in the 4 × 100 m). In addition, he also ran a 4.5-second 40-yard dash and had a 32-inch vertical.

Regarded as a three-star recruit, many Pac-10 and Big 12 schools had interest in him, but backed away because of fears he would not be academically eligible. Fresno State remained in the recruiting scene and eventually Mathews signed with them. He was also teammates with CFL cornerback A. J. Jefferson.

== College career ==
Mathews attended California State University, Fresno from 2007 to 2009. Mathews had his breakout game with 14 carries for 171 rushing yards and three rushing touchdowns against Nevada. Later in the season, he had 16 carries for 144 rushing yard and two rushing touchdowns against San Jose State. As a freshman in 2007, Mathews rushed for 866 yards on 145 carries and scored 14 touchdowns. His rushing yard average and touchdowns led all NCAA freshmen.

As a sophomore in 2008, he ranked in the top 10 in the NCAA in rushing yards and touchdowns after four games. In the season opener against Rutgers, he had 26 carries for 163 rushing yards and three rushing touchdowns. In the fourth game against UCLA, he ran for 166 yards and scored two touchdowns. After the injury, he missed most of the next three games and sat out the final five. He finished the season with 606 yards on 113 carries and eight touchdowns.

In Fresno State's third game in the 2009 season, Mathews had 19 carries for 234 rushing yards and three rushing touchdowns against Boise State. In his next two games against Cincinnati and Hawaii, he went over 140 rushing yards and scored a touchdown against both. In the following game against San Jose State, he had 20 carries for 233 rushing yards and a rushing touchdown. In his next three games, against New Mexico State, Utah State, and Idaho, he totaled 157, 185, and 143 rushing yards. He scored seven total rushing touchdowns in the three-game stretch. On December 5, he had 32 carries for 173 rushing yards and three rushing touchdowns against Illinois. In his final collegiate game, he had 31 carries for 144 rushing yards and two rushing touchdowns in the New Mexico Bowl against Wyoming. As a junior in 2009, Mathews led college football in rushing with an average of 150.67 yards per game in 12 games. He totaled 1,808 yards on 276 carries and 19 touchdowns. He missed one game due to a concussion.

Following the regular season, he was given numerous individual awards, including being named first team all-WAC and a second team All-American by CBS Sports, Sports Illustrated, and the Associated Press.

In December 2009, Mathews decided to forgo his senior season and enter the 2010 NFL draft. His 1,808 yards rushing ranks him behind only LaDainian Tomlinson and George Jones in the WAC season record books.

== Professional career ==
Pre-draft measurables
Height	Weight	Arm length	Hand span	40-yard dash	20-yard shuttle	Three-cone drill	Vertical jump	Broad jump	Bench press	Wonderlic
5 ft 11 5/8 in (1.82 m)	218 lb (99 kg)	31 in (0.79 m)	9 1/4 in (0.23 m)	4.45 s	4.33 s	7.00 s	36 in (0.91 m)	10 ft 1 in (3.07 m)	19 reps	16
All values from NFL Combine

=== San Diego Chargers ===
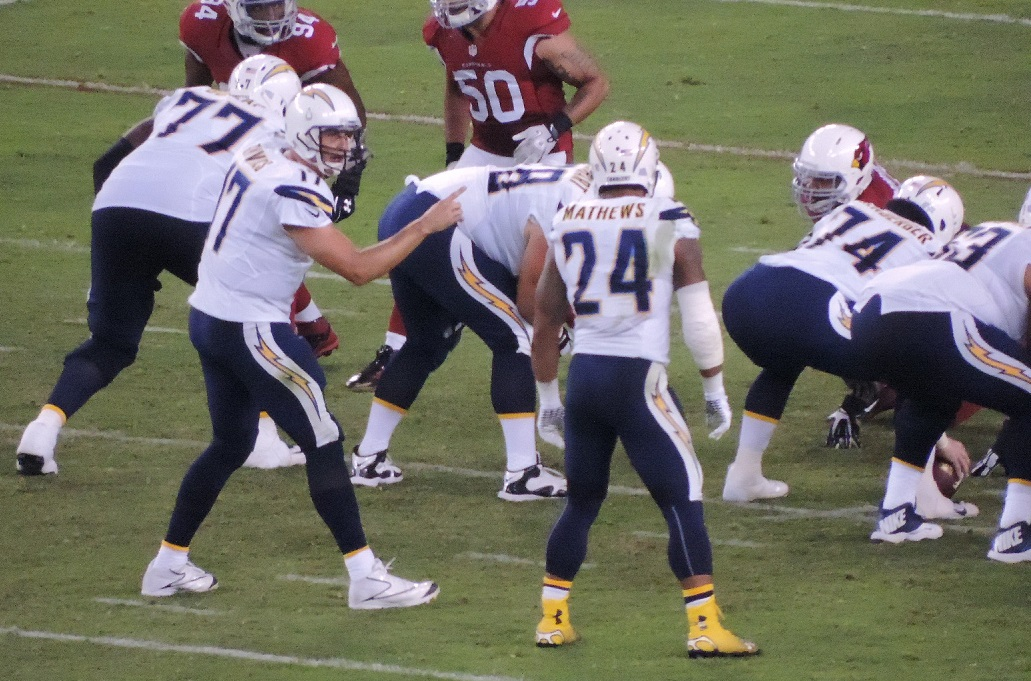
Mathews (No. 24) with quarterback Philip Rivers (left) in the backfield in 2014

Mathews was selected by the San Diego Chargers in the first round with the 12th overall pick in the 2010 NFL draft. He is the third highest Fresno State Bulldog to be drafted since David Carr went first overall in the 2002 NFL draft and Trent Dilfer went sixth overall in the 1994 NFL draft.

Nate Cohn of The New York Times in 2022 listed Mathews and Anthony Barr as the only two of 19 top NFL draft picks since 2005 whose careers justified being chosen much earlier than their ESPN draft ranking.

On August 1, 2010, Mathews signed a five-year, $26.65 million contract with the Chargers. The deal included $15 million guaranteed. In his NFL debut in Week 1, he had 20 carries for 78 rushing yards in the 21–14 loss to the Kansas City Chiefs. In Week 17, he had 26 carries for 120 rushing yards and three rushing touchdowns in the 33–28 victory over the Denver Broncos. As a rookie, Mathews finished with 158 carries for 678 rushing yards and seven rushing touchdowns.

In the 2011 season, Mathews had four games going over 100 rushing yards and two games with multiple rushing touchdowns. Mathews received praise for his improved play as a second-year running back. He finished with 1,091 rushing yards and six touchdowns and made the Pro Bowl as an alternate for Ray Rice.

On August 9, 2012, Mathews broke his right clavicle on his first carry in the first preseason game of 2012 against the Green Bay Packers. He was expected to be out for 4–6 weeks. On September 23, Mathews returned from his collarbone injury in Week 3 of the regular season. In the 27–3 loss to the Atlanta Falcons, Mathews made his season debut and rushed for 44 yards on 10 carries and caught five passes for 32 yards. However, he had a fumble inside the Falcons' 5-yard line. In the following game against Kansas City, Jackie Battle started instead of Mathews. Battle was in 27 plays compared to Mathews' 21, with most of Mathews work in the fourth quarter when San Diego's victory was mostly already decided. U-T San Diego wrote that Mathews would have been expected to start were it not for his fumble against Atlanta. On December 16 against the Carolina Panthers, Mathews broke his left clavicle and was placed on season-ending injured reserve for the remainder of the 2012 season. He finished the 2012 season with 184 carries for 707 rushing yards and one rushing touchdown to go along with 39 receptions for 252 receiving yards in 12 games.

In 2013, Mathews did not miss a game due to injury for the first time in his career. He led the NFL with six 100-yard games, and set a career-high in rushing yards with 1,255 that season; it was the most yards by a Charger since Tomlinson's 1,474 in 2007. Mathews led the NFL in both carries (121) and yards rushing (534) for the month of December, and ran for 100 yards in three of the final four games of the season. He fell short with 99 yards in a 26–13 win against the Oakland Raiders, when he also injured his left ankle. The following week in the regular season finale, he ran for a career-high 144 yards in a 27–24 overtime win over Kansas City that qualified San Diego for the playoffs. It was the Chargers' first postseason appearance since Mathews was drafted in 2010. The team won 27–10 in a Wild Card Round win against the Cincinnati Bengals. Mathews had 52 yards on 13 carries, but ran the ball just once in the second half due to his injured ankle. It was the second consecutive week he was a limited practice participant on Friday before playing on Sunday. Still hurting, he started the following game in the Divisional Round against the Denver Broncos despite being unable to practice the entire week. However, he was limited to five carries and 26 yards and left the game in the second quarter in a 24–17 Chargers loss.

Mathews missed seven games in 2014 after he sustained a sprained MCL in Week 2 against the Seattle Seahawks. He had 12 carries for 105 rushing yards and a touchdown against the St. Louis Rams in Week 12. After suffering an ankle sprain in Week 14 against the New England Patriots, he missed the remainder of the regular season.

=== Philadelphia Eagles ===
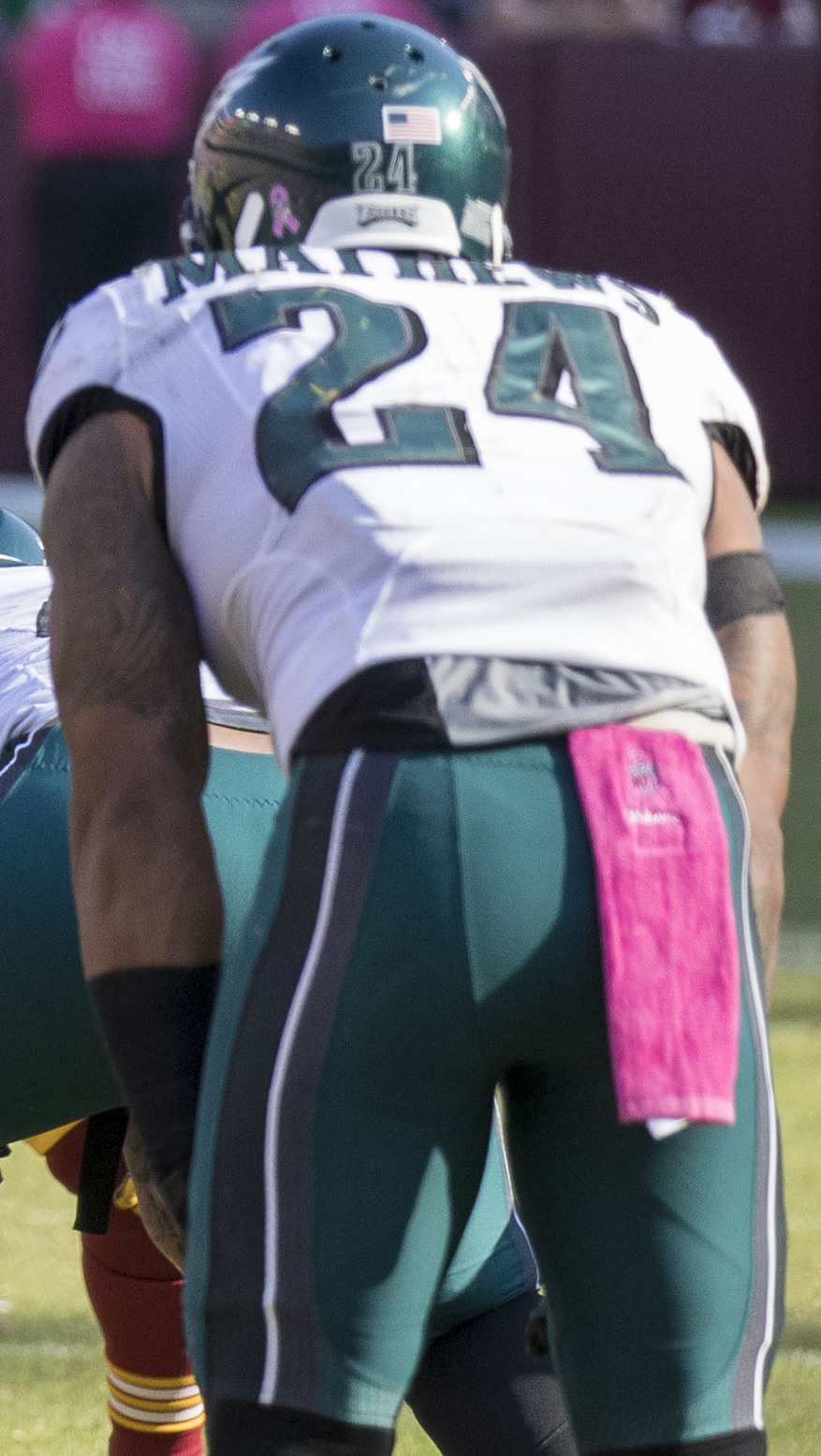
Mathews in 2016

Mathews signed a three-year deal with the Philadelphia Eagles on March 12, 2015. However, the Eagles also signed NFL rushing champion DeMarco Murray and already had Darren Sproles, who scored six rushing touchdowns on limited carries in 2014. However, Murray played poorly in the first two games of the season against the Atlanta Falcons and Dallas Cowboys, rushing for 11 yards on 21 carries, although Mathews was not much better, rushing for four yards on four carries and one touchdown, while Sproles led the team with 46 yards on six carries. When Murray went down with a hamstring injury in week 3, Mathews stepped up against the 2–0 New York Jets and rushed for 108 yards on 24 carries while catching a 23-yard receiving touchdown. When Murray returned in Week 4, Mathews was again the backup, while Murray had another sub-par game against Washington. In Week 5, Murray rushed for 83 yards on 20 carries leading the team in rushing, but Mathews was only ten yards behind with only eight carries, and he also had a touchdown. Mathew's best performance was against the then undefeated Carolina Panthers, where he rushed for 97 yards on six carries. Mathews' chances of starting were damaged when he was knocked out with a concussion in a 20–19 loss to the Miami Dolphins, which led to Darren Sproles becoming the feature back. Upon his return, he played on an average level, but had a good game against the 11–2 Arizona Cardinals (11 carries for 58 yards) and finally won the starting job. Ultimately, he lost his starting job to DeMarco Murray in a Week 16 loss to the Redskins, where he had four carries for five yards and a touchdown. Through an up and down season, Mathews finished by leading the team in rushing touchdowns with six, as well as compiling 539 rushing yards on 106 carries, a 5.1 average.

In Week 10 of the 2016 season, Mathews had 19 carries for 109 rushing yards and two rushing touchdowns in a 24–15 victory over the Atlanta Falcons. In Week 15, he had 20 carries for 128 rushing yards and one rushing touchdown against the Baltimore Ravens. In the 2016 season, Mathews played in 13 games with eight starts, finishing the season with 661 rushing yards and eight touchdowns along with 13 receptions for 115 yards and one touchdown. He was placed on injured reserve on December 27, 2016, after suffering a herniated disc during a game against the New York Giants in Week 16.

On August 15, 2017, Mathews was released by the Eagles after recovering from offseason neck surgery.

== NFL career statistics ==
Year	Team	GP	Rushing					Receiving					Fum
Year	Team	GP	Att	Yds	Avg	Lng	TD	Rec	Yds	Avg	Lng	TD	Fum
2010	SD	12	158	678	4.3	31	7	22	145	6.6	17	0	5
2011	SD	14	222	1,091	4.9	39	6	50	455	9.1	42	0	5
2012	SD	12	184	707	3.8	31	1	39	252	6.5	24	0	2
2013	SD	16	285	1,255	4.4	54	6	26	189	7.3	17	1	2
2014	SD	6	74	330	4.5	17	3	9	69	7.7	16	0	1
2015	PHI	13	106	539	5.1	63	6	20	146	7.3	23	1	3
2016	PHI	13	155	661	4.3	30	8	13	115	8.8	27	1	2
Career		83	1,184	5,261	4.4	63	37	179	1,371	7.7	42	3	22

== Personal life ==
Mathews grew up as a fan of the San Diego Chargers since childhood and is a fan of LaDainian Tomlinson, particularly because of his running style. He wore No. 21 in high school and at Fresno State in honor of Tomlinson.

He is also a member of Sigma Phi Epsilon fraternity.
