= D. J. Reed =

American football player (born 1996)

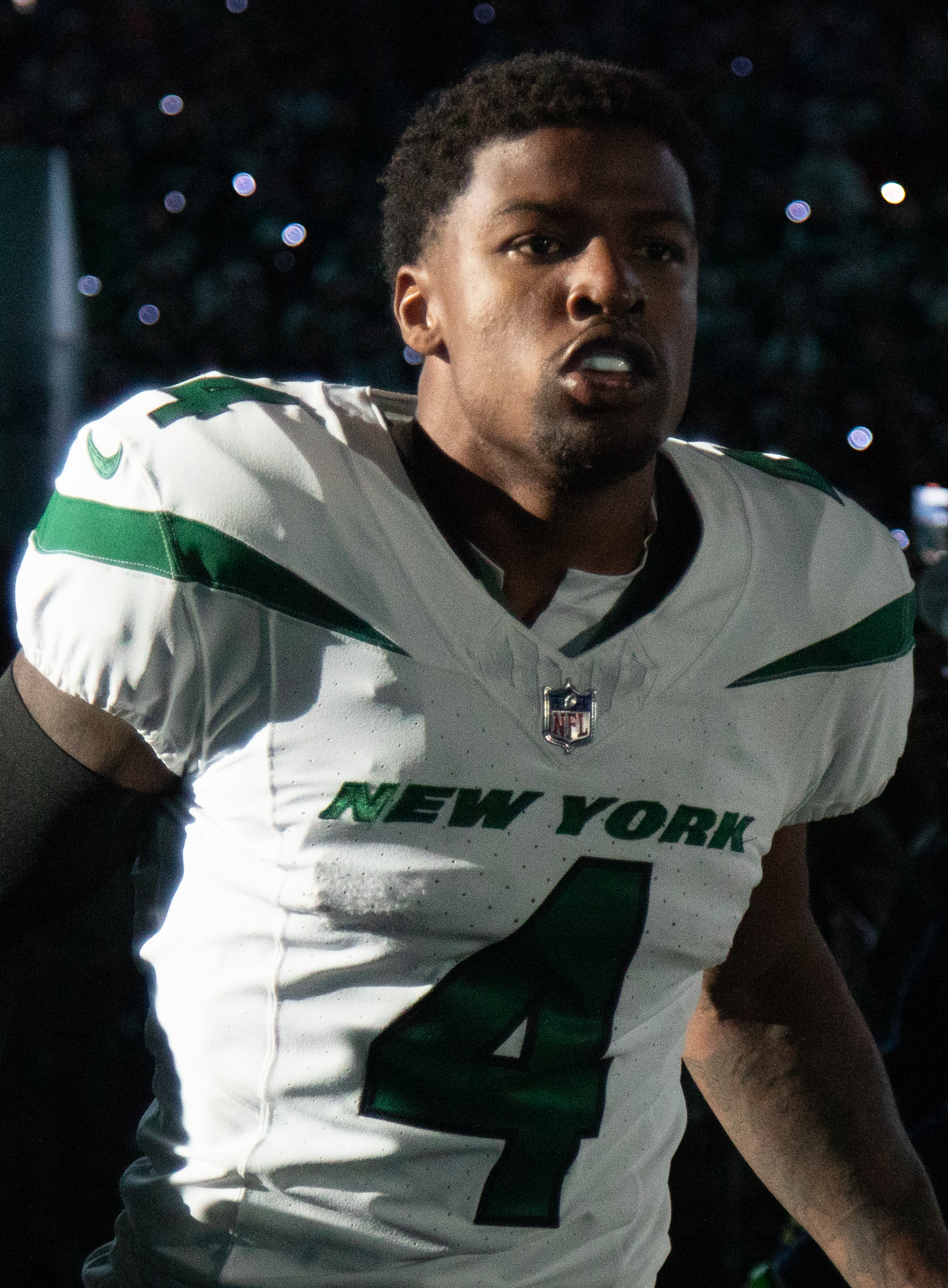
- Reed with the New York Jets in 2023

No. 4 – Detroit Lions
- Position: Cornerback
- Roster status: Active

Personal information
- Born: November 11, 1996 (age 29); Bakersfield, California, U.S.
- Listed height: 5 ft 9 in (1.75 m)
- Listed weight: 190 lb (86 kg)

Career information
- High school: Independence (Bakersfield)
- College: Fresno State (2014); Cerritos (2015); Kansas State (2016-2017)
- NFL draft: 2018: 5th round, 142nd overall pick

Career history
- San Francisco 49ers (2018–2019); Seattle Seahawks (2020–2021); New York Jets (2022–2024); Detroit Lions (2025–present)

Awards and highlights
- Big 12 Defensive Newcomer of the Year (2016); Second-team All-American (2017); 2× First-team All-Big 12 (2016, 2017)

Career NFL statistics as of 2025
- Total tackles: 460
- Sacks: 2
- Pass deflections: 58
- Interceptions: 8
- Forced fumbles: 5
- Fumble recoveries: 5
- Defensive touchdowns: 1
- Stats at Pro Football Reference

Dennis Duane "D. J." Reed Jr. (born November 11, 1996) is an American professional football cornerback for the Detroit Lions of the National Football League (NFL). He played college football for the Kansas State Wildcats and was selected by the San Francisco 49ers in the fifth round of the 2018 NFL draft.

== Early life ==
Reed attended Independence High School in Bakersfield, California. In his high school football career, he totaled six interceptions and five forced fumbles along with 1,150 total yards of offense with 13 touchdowns. Along with football, he also played basketball and was the first person in school history to be named MVP in both sports. Deciding to pursue football full-time as a senior in high school but receiving no scholarship offers, Reed earned a spot as a walk-on at Fresno State after a successful tryout for their football team.

== College career ==
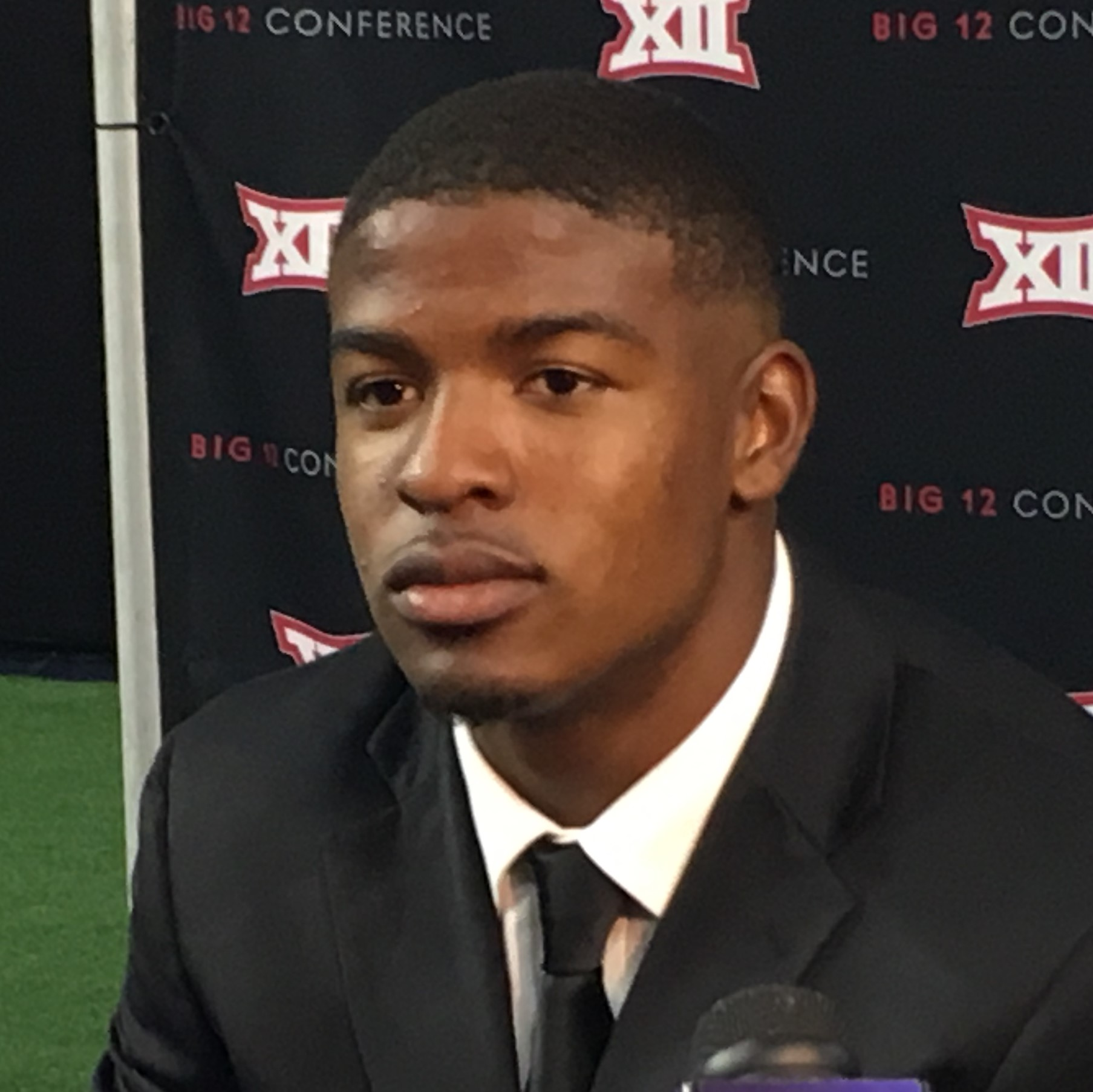
Reed in 2017

Reed redshirted as a true freshman at Fresno State in 2014. After Fresno State's coaching staff declined to offer Reed a scholarship in the spring of 2015, Reed chose to transfer from Fresno State to Cerritos College, a community college in Norwalk, California. In his lone year at Cerritos, Reed played in 11 games, tallying 42 tackles three pass breakups, and two interceptions. After one year at Cerritos, Reed once again transferred, this time to Kansas State. As a redshirt sophomore in 2016, Reed played in all 13 games as a cornerback and a return specialist, starting 12 games at cornerback. Reed totaled 75 tackles, 19 pass breakups, three interceptions, and two forced fumbles, and returned nine kickoffs for 255 yards. After the season, he was named first-team All-Big 12 at cornerback.

Prior to the 2017 season, Reed was named to the Chuck Bednarik Award watch list, the Jim Thorpe Award watch list and the Bronko Nagurski Award watch list. A team captain, Reed started 11 games at cornerback in 2017; he missed the last two regular season games due to injury, but played in the Cactus Bowl). He recorded 47 tackles, four interceptions, nine pass breakups, and one forced fumble on defense. He also excelled as a return specialist, returning 17 punts for 253 yards and one touchdown, and returned 17 kicks for 582 yards and one touchdown. After the conclusion of the season, he was named first-team All-Big 12 at cornerback and second-team All-Big 12 as a return specialist, while also achieving second-team All-American honors. Reed declared for the 2018 NFL draft on December 31, 2017.

== Professional career ==
=== Pre-draft ===
Matt Miller of Bleacher Report ranked Reed as the 19th best cornerback prospect in the draft. NFL draft analysts and scouts projected him to be selected in the fourth to fifth round of the 2018 NFL Draft.

External videos
- 2018 NFL Combine Workout: D.J. Reed

Pre-draft measurables
| Height | Weight | Arm length | Hand span | Wingspan | 40-yard dash | 10-yard split | 20-yard split | 20-yard shuttle | Three-cone drill | Vertical jump | Broad jump | Bench press |
|---|---|---|---|---|---|---|---|---|---|---|---|---|
| 5 ft 9 1/8 in (1.76 m) | 188 lb (85 kg) | 31 5/8 in (0.80 m) | 10 in (0.25 m) | 6 ft 3 in (1.91 m) | 4.51 s | 1.56 s | 2.62 s | 4.06 s | 6.82 s | 36.5 in (0.93 m) | 10 ft 4 in (3.15 m) | 11 reps |
All values from NFL Combine/Pro Day

=== San Francisco 49ers ===
==== 2018 ====
The San Francisco 49ers selected Reed in the fifth round (142nd overall) of the 2018 NFL draft. He was the 16th cornerback drafted. On May 12, 2018, the 49ers signed Reed to a four–year, $2.77 million rookie contract that includes a signing bonus of $311,371.

External videos
- SF 49ers select D.J. Reed No. 142

Throughout training camp, he competed for a roster spot as a backup cornerback against Emmanuel Moseley, Greg Mabin, and Tarvarus McFadden. He also provided depth at nickelback behind K'Waun Williams and Jimmie Ward. Head coach Kyle Shanahan named Reed a backup and listed him as the sixth cornerback on the depth chart to begin the season, behind Richard Sherman, Ahkello Witherspoon, K'Waun Williams, Jimmie Ward, and Tarvarus McFadden.

On September 9, 2018, Reed made his professional regular season debut in the San Francisco 49ers' season-opener at the Minnesota Vikings, but was limited to 14 snaps on special teams during their 16–24 loss. On September 30, 2018, Reed earned his first career start in place of Richard Sherman who was inactive due to a calf injury. He recorded two combined tackles (one solo) as the 49ers lost 27–29 at the Los Angeles Chargers. He was inactive for the 49ers' 16–43 loss at the Seattle Seahawks in Week 13 due to an injury to his heel. On December 10, 2018, Reed set a season-high with 12 combined tackles (ten solo), forced a fumble, and had his first career sack on Case Keenum for a five–yard loss as the 49ers defeated the Denver Broncos 20–14. He finished his rookie season with 41 combined tackles (30 solo), one forced fumble, and one sack in 15 games and two starts. As a rookie, he also returned kicks and played safety during the season.

==== 2019 ====
He entered training camp slated to remain a backup and competed to maintain his roster spot against Emmanuel Moseley, Greg Mabin, Jason Verrett, Dontae Johnson, and Tim Harris. He was also a candidate to be the primary backup nickelback. He began the season as a backup and was listed as the fifth cornerback on the depth chart, behind Richard Sherman, Ahkello Witherspoon, K'Waun Williams, and Jason Verrett.

On September 15, 2019, Reed set a season-high with three combined tackles (two solo) and set a season-high with two pass deflections during a 41–17 victory at the Cincinnati Bengals. In Week 11, Reed made two solo tackles and returned a fumble recovery five–yards to score his first career touchdown as the 49ers defeated the Arizona Cardinals 26–36. The 49ers were leading the Cardinals 26–29 win two seconds remaining as Kyler Murray threw a pass to wide receiver Larry Fitzgerald that would be fumbled and recovered by Reed and returned for five-yards to score a touchdown and seal their victory. He appeared in all 16 games in 2019, but finished the season with only 13 combined tackles (11 solo), two pass deflections, one forced fumble, one fumble recovery, and a touchdown.

The San Francisco 49ers finished the 2019 NFL season a top the NFC West with a 13–3 record to clinch a first-round bye. On January 11, 2020, Reed appeared in the first playoff game of his career, but saw limited snaps as the 49ers defeated the Minnesota Vikings 27–10 in the Divisional Round. In the NFC Championship Game, the 49ers defeated the Green Bay Packers 37–20. On February 2, 2020, Reed appeared in Super Bowl LIV, but made only one tackle while playing only nine snaps on special teams as the 49ers lost 31–20 to the Kansas City Chiefs.

==== 2020 ====
On July 28, 2020, the San Francisco 49ers placed him on the active/non-football injury list at the start of training camp after he had suffered a torn pectoral while lifting weights in the off-season. On August 4, 2020, the 49ers waived Reed from the list with a non-football injury designation.

=== Seattle Seahawks ===
On August 5, 2020, the Seattle Seahawks claimed Reed off waivers. On September 5, 2020, the Seahawks placed him on reserve/non-football injury list at the start of the regular season as he recovered from his surgery to repair his torn pectoral. On October 31, 2020, the Seattle Seahawks activated him from the NFI list and added him to their active roster after he was inactive for the first six games (Weeks 1–7) of the regular season. Immediately upon joining the active roster, head coach Pete Carroll listed Reed as the third cornerback on the depth chart and the starting nickelback behind Tre Flowers and Quinton Dunbar, replacing Shaquill Griffin who suffered a concussion the previous week.

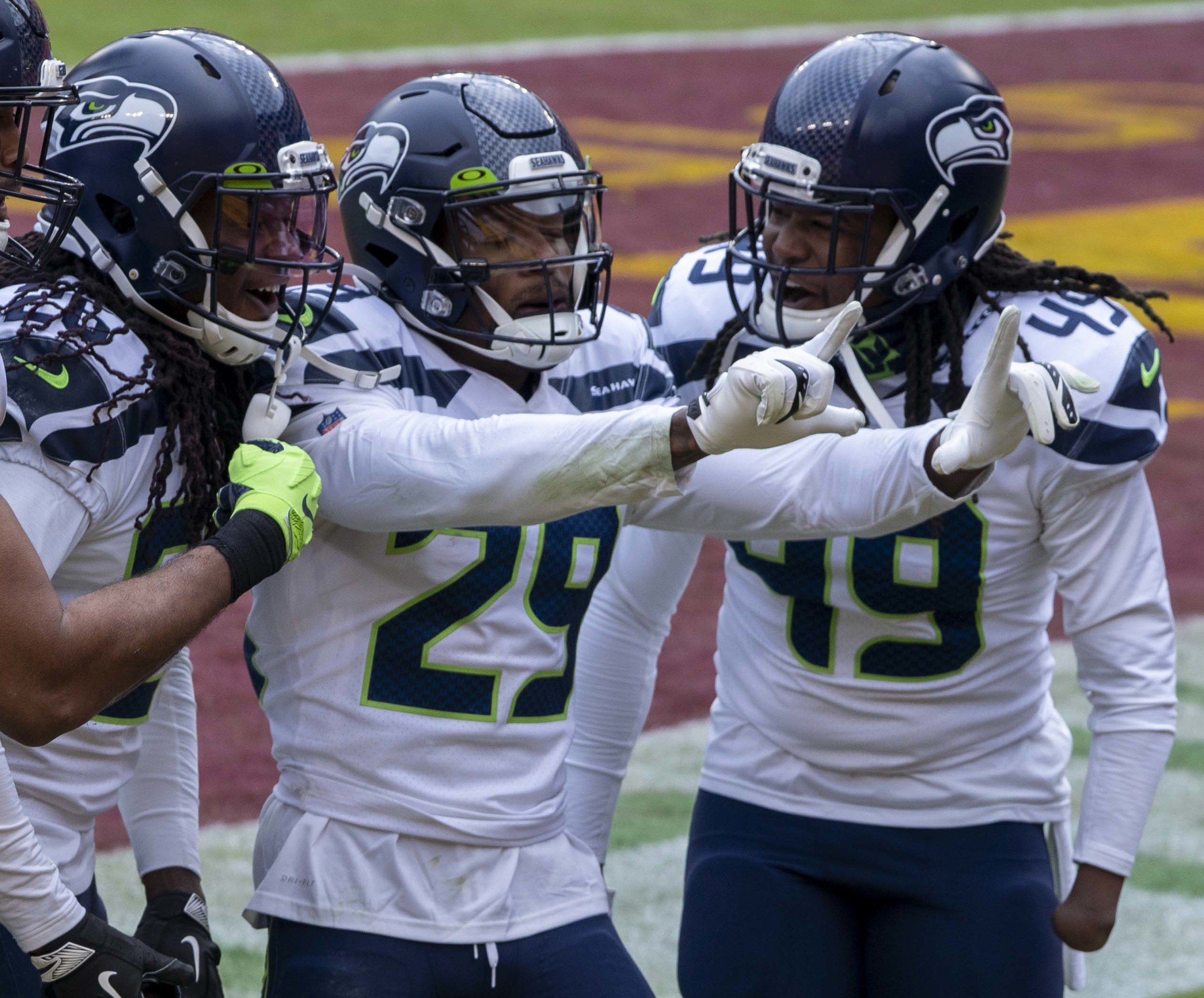
Reed with Shaquill Griffin (left) and Shaquem Griffin (right) in 2020

On November 1, 2020, Reed made his debut with the Seahawks against his former team the San Francisco 49ers and made six solo tackles, one pass deflection, and had his first career interception on a pass attempt thrown by Jimmy Garoppolo to tight end George Kittle during a 37–27 win in Week 8. In Week 10, Reed started as the No. 2 starting cornerback after Quinton Dunbar was placed on injured reserve due to a knee injury. He set a season-high with ten solo tackles and had a fumble recovery as the Seahawks lost 16–23 at the Los Angeles Rams. The following week, he set a season-high with 11 combined tackles (nine solo) and made one pass deflection during a 28–21 win against the Arizona Cardinals in Week 11. In Week 15, Reed made six combined tackles (four solo), set a season-high with three pass deflections, and intercepted a pass by Dwayne Haskins to wide receiver Cam Sims during a 20–15 victory at the Washington Football Team. Due to his strong play, Reed retained his starting position for the rest of the season, even when Dunbar was healthy. He finished the season with a total of 62 combined tackles (46 solo), seven pass deflections, and two interceptions in ten games and eight starts. He received an overall grade of 75.2 from Pro Football Focus in 2020.

==== 2021 ====
Throughout training camp, he competed to be a starting cornerback against Ahkello Witherspoon, Tre Brown, Tre Flowers, Pierre Desir, and Damarious Randall following the departures of Shaquill Griffin and Quinton Dunbar. Head coach Pete Carroll named him the No. 1 starting cornerback to begin the season and paired him up with Tre Flowers after the Seahawks traded Ahkello Witherspoon to the Pittsburgh Steelers.

In Week 6, he set a season-high with nine combined tackles (seven solo) and made two pass deflections during a 20–23 overtime loss at the Pittsburgh Steelers. He was inactive for the Seahawks' 13–23 loss against the Arizona Cardinals in Week 11 due to a groin injury. In Week 14, Reed set a season-high with eight solo tackles during a 33–13 victory at the Houston Texans. On December 19, 2021, the Seattle Seahawks officially placed him on the COVID-19/reserve list. On December 29, 2021, the Seahawks activated Reed from the COVID-19/reserve list after he was inactive for the previous two games (Weeks 15–16). On January 2, 2022, Reed made eight combined tackles (seven solo), set a season-high with three pass deflections, and set a career-high with two interceptions on passes thrown by Tim Boyle during a 29–51 win against the Detroit Lions. He finished the season with 78 combined tackles (62 solo), ten pass deflections, two interceptions, and one fumble recovery in 14 games and 14 starts. He received an overall grade of 78.6 from Pro Football Focus in 2021.

=== New York Jets ===
==== 2022 ====
On March 17, 2022, the New York Jets signed Reed to a three–year, $33.00 million contract that includes $10.50 million guaranteed upon signing and an initial signing bonus of $9.46 million. He was reunited with New York Jets' head coach, Robert Saleh, who had previously been his defensive coordinator with the San Francisco 49ers from 2018–2019. He entered training camp slated as a starting cornerback under defensive coordinator Jeff Ulbrich. He was named a starting cornerback to begin the season and was paired with 2022 rookie first-round pick (fourth overall) Sauce Gardner.

On September 11, 2022, Reed made his Jets' debut in their home-opener against the Baltimore Ravens and made two solo tackles, a pass deflection, and intercepted a pass by Lamar Jackson to wide receiver Demarcus Robinson during their 24–9 loss. In Week 7, he recorded eight combined tackles (seven solo) and set a season-high with three pass deflections during a 16–9 at the Denver Broncos. On December 22, 2022, he set a season-high with nine combined tackles (four solo) and had one pass deflection as the Jets lost 3–19 to the Jacksonville Jaguars. He started in all 17 games for the first time in his career and set a career-high with 80 combined tackles (63 solo), 12 pass deflections, and one interception. He received an overall grade of 72.5 from Pro Football Focus in 2022.

==== 2023 ====
He entered training camp slated as the de facto No. 2 starting cornerback. He returned alongside Sauce Gardner as the starting cornerback duo to begin the regular season.

On September 11, 2023, Reed started in the New York Jets' home-opener against the Buffalo Bills and set a season-high with 11 combined tackles (ten solo) during their 22–16 overtime victory. On October 1, 2023, Reed recorded eight combined tackles (five solo), but suffered a concussion while attempting to tackle wide receiver Skyy Moore on an 11–yard reverse during the fourth quarter of the Jets' 20–23 loss to the Kansas City Chiefs on Sunday Night Football. During the tackle attempt, Reed accidentally made a helmet-to-helmet collision with Moore. He was placed in concussion protocol and remained inactive for the next two games (Weeks 5–6). He later expressed regret for continuing to play through concussion symptoms until the end of the game against the Chiefs. In Week 12, Reed made ten combined tackles (eight solo), one pass deflection, and made an interception on a pass thrown by Tua Tagovailoa to wide receiver Tyreek Hill as the Jets lost 13–34 against the Miami Dolphins. In Week 14, he recorded four solo tackles and set a season-high with three pass deflections as the Jets defeated the Houston Texans 30–6. He finished with a total of 76 combined tackles (62 solo), nine pass deflections, and one interception in 15 games and 15 starts. He received an overall grade of 77.9 from Pro Football Focus in 2023.

==== 2024 ====
Head coach Robert Saleh named Reed and Sauce Gardner the starting cornerbacks to begin their third consecutive season. On September 9, 2024, Reed started in the New York Jets' season-opener at the San Francisco 49ers and set a season-high with nine combined tackles (seven solo) and made one pass deflection as they lost 19–32. He was inactive for the Jets' 24–17 victory at the Tennessee Titans in Week 2 due to a knee injury. On October 8, 2024, the Jets fired head coach Robert Saleh after falling to a 2–3 record. They appointed defensive coordinator Jeff Ulbrich to interim head coach in his place. He injured his groin and was unable to play in the Jets' 37–15 loss at the Pittsburgh Steelers in Week 7. He was also inactive during a 32–25 victory at the Jacksonville Jaguars in Week 15 due to a groin injury. He finished the season with 64 combined tackles (52 solo), 11 pass deflections, and one sack in 14 games and 14 starts. He received an overall grade of 70.7 from Pro Football Focus, which ranked 43rd amongst 222 qualifying cornerbacks in 2024.

=== Detroit Lions ===
On March 10, 2025, the Detroit Lions signed Reed to a three–year, $48.00 million contract that includes $30.98 million guaranteed upon signing and a signing bonus of $15.23 million. On October 1, Reed was placed on injured reserve due to a strained hamstring. He was activated on November 22, ahead of the team's Week 12 matchup against the New York Giants.

== NFL career statistics ==
Legend
| **Bold** | Career high |

=== Regular season ===
| Year | Team | Games | | Tackles | | | | | Interceptions | | | | | Fumbles | | | | |
| Year | Team | GP | GS | Comb | Solo | Ast | Sck | TFL | Int | Yds | Lng | TD | PD | FF | Fum | FR | Yds | TD |
|---|---|---|---|---|---|---|---|---|---|---|---|---|---|---|---|---|---|---|
| 2018 | SF | 15 | 0 | 41 | 30 | 11 | **1.0** | 3 | 0 | 0 | 0 | 0 | 0 | **1** | **2** | 0 | 0 | 0 |
| 2019 | SF | 16 | 0 | 13 | 11 | 2 | 0.0 | 0 | 0 | 0 | 0 | 0 | 2 | **1** | 0 | 1 | **5** | **1** |
| 2020 | SEA | 10 | 8 | 62 | 46 | 16 | 0.0 | 2 | **2** | 21 | 20 | 0 | 7 | 0 | 1 | **2** | 0 | 0 |
| 2021 | SEA | 14 | 14 | 78 | 62 | 16 | 0.0 | 0 | **2** | 9 | 7 | 0 | 10 | 0 | 0 | 1 | 0 | 0 |
| 2022 | NYJ | **17** | **17** | **80** | **63** | **17** | 0.0 | 1 | 1 | 0 | 0 | 0 | **12** | **1** | 0 | 0 | 0 | 0 |
| 2023 | NYJ | 15 | 15 | 76 | 62 | 14 | 0.0 | 2 | 1 | 0 | 0 | 0 | 9 | **1** | 0 | 0 | 0 | 0 |
| 2024 | NYJ | 14 | 14 | 64 | 52 | 12 | **1.0** | **4** | 0 | 0 | 0 | 0 | 11 | 0 | 0 | 0 | 0 | 0 |
| 2025 | DET | 8 | 8 | 33 | 29 | 4 | 0.0 | 0 | **2** | **34** | **34** | 0 | 7 | **1** | 0 | 1 | 3 | 0 |
| Career | | 109 | 78 | 477 | 355 | 92 | 2.0 | 12 | 8 | 64 | 34 | 0 | 58 | 5 | 3 | 5 | 8 | 1 |

=== Postseason ===
| Year | Team | Games | | Tackles | | | | | Interceptions | | | | | Fumbles | | | | |
| Year | Team | GP | GS | Comb | Solo | Ast | Sck | TFL | Int | Yds | Lng | TD | PD | FF | Fum | FR | Yds | TD |
|---|---|---|---|---|---|---|---|---|---|---|---|---|---|---|---|---|---|---|
| 2019 | SF | **3** | 0 | 1 | 0 | **1** | 0.0 | 0 | 0 | 0 | 0.0 | 0 | 0 | 0 | 0 | 0 | 0 | 0 |
| 2020 | SEA | 1 | **1** | **3** | **3** | 0 | 0.0 | 0 | 0 | 0 | 0.0 | 0 | **1** | 0 | **1** | 0 | 0 | 0 |
| Career | | 4 | 1 | 4 | 3 | 1 | 0.0 | 0 | 0 | 0 | 0.0 | 0 | 1 | 0 | 1 | 0 | 0 | 0 |
