= Anthony Orange =

American football player (born 1988)

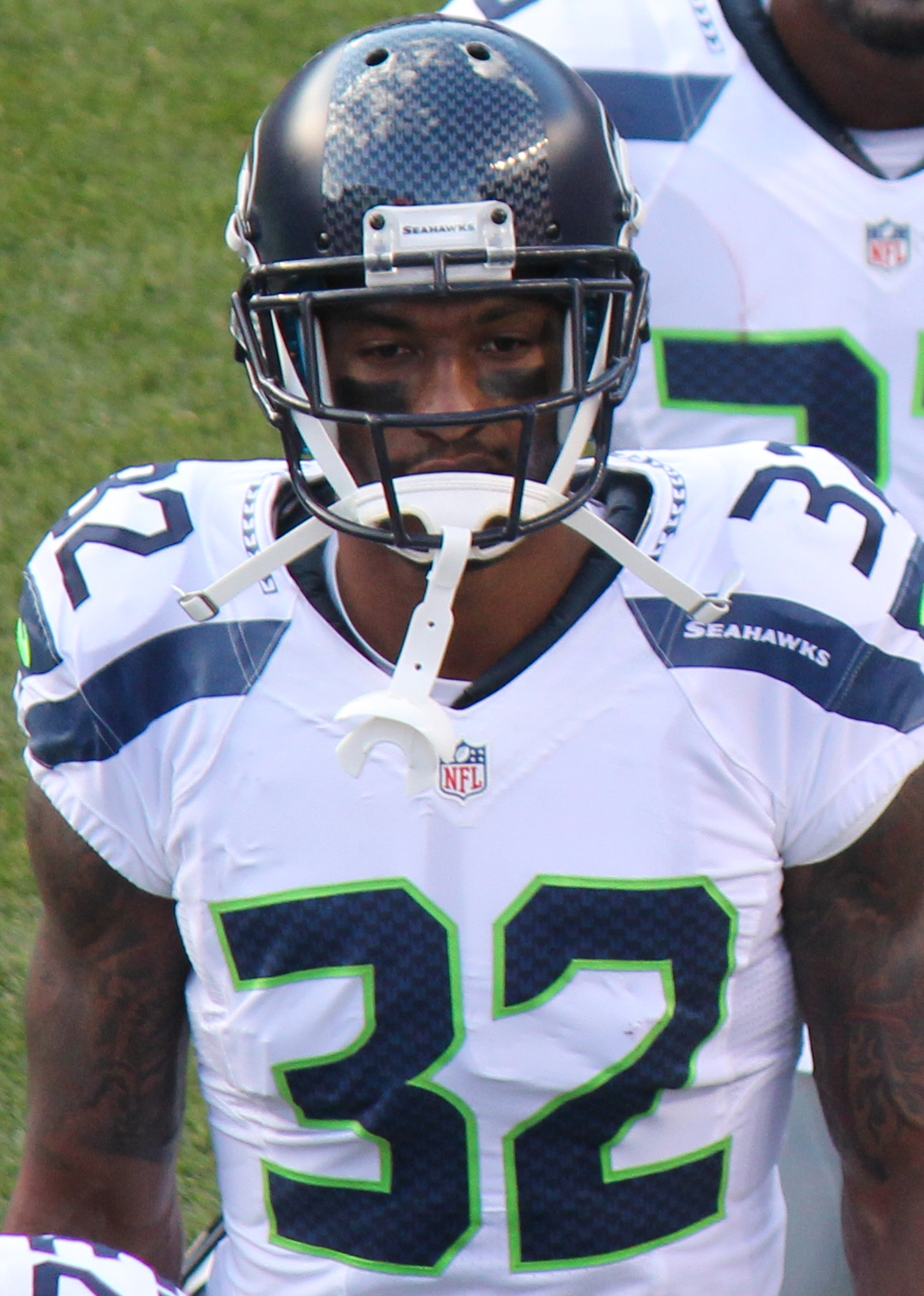
- Orange with the Seattle Seahawks in 2014

No. 20, 24, 26
- Position: Cornerback

Personal information
- Born: April 4, 1988 (age 38); Bakersfield, California, U.S.
- Listed height: 6 ft 0 in (1.83 m)
- Listed weight: 190 lb (86 kg)

Career information
- High school: West (Bakersfield)
- College: Fresno State (2006–2009)
- NFL draft: 2010: undrafted

Career history
- Arizona Cardinals (2010–2011); Minnesota Vikings (2012–2013); Seattle Seahawks (2014)*; Toronto Argonauts (2015–2016); Ottawa Redblacks (2017); Saskatchewan Roughriders (2017)*; Edmonton Eskimos (2017)*; BC Lions (2018); Edmonton Eskimos (2019)
- * Offseason or practice squad member only

Awards and highlights
- CFL All-Star (2018); CFL West All-Star (2018)

Career NFL statistics
- Total tackles: 109
- Fumble recoveries: 2
- Pass deflections: 19
- Interceptions: 2
- Stats at Pro Football Reference

Career CFL statistics
- Total tackles: 149
- Interceptions: 11
- Defensive touchdowns: 2
- Stats at CFL.ca

Anthony Orange (born Anthony Ray Jefferson Jr., April 4, 1988), previously known as A. J. Jefferson, is an American former professional football player who was a cornerback in the National Football League (NFL) and Canadian Football League (CFL). He played college football for the Fresno State Bulldogs. He was signed as an undrafted free agent by the Arizona Cardinals in 2010.

== Early life and college ==
Orange was born and raised in Bakersfield, California, where he graduated from West High School in 2006. He began playing football at an early age but didn't play his junior year of high school. He played wide receiver and defensive back and earned first-team all-area selection as defensive back. Orange was a high school teammate of Ryan Mathews.

College recruiting
Name	Hometown	School	Height	Weight	Commit date
A. J. Jefferson; WR	Bakersfield, California	West HS	6 ft 0 in (1.83 m)	180 lb (82 kg)	Feb 1, 2006
A. J. Jefferson; WR	Recruit ratings: Scout: Rivals:				
Overall recruit ranking: Scout: 96 (school) Rivals: 83 (school)
Note: In many cases, Scout, Rivals, 247Sports, On3, and ESPN may conflict in their listings of height and weight.; In these cases, the average was taken. ESPN grades are on a 100-point scale.; Sources: "2006 Fresno St. Football Commitment List". Rivals.; "2006 Fresno State College Football Team Recruiting Prospects". Scout.; "Scout.com Team Recruiting Rankings". Scout.; "2006 Team Ranking". Rivals.com.

Orange then attended California State University, Fresno. From 2006 to 2009, He played four seasons for the Fresno State Bulldogs.

== Professional career ==
=== Pre-draft ===
Orange was invited to the 2010 Scouting Combine and was predicted as a 4th to 5th round draft pick.

Pre-draft measurables
Height	Weight	Arm length	Hand span	40-yard dash	10-yard split	20-yard split	20-yard shuttle	Three-cone drill	Vertical jump	Broad jump	Bench press
6 ft 0 1/8 in (1.83 m)	193 lb (88 kg)	32 1/2 in (0.83 m)	9 1/4 in (0.23 m)	4.51 s	1.59 s	2.65 s	4.00 s	6.72 s	44 in (1.12 m)	10 ft 6 in (3.20 m)	7 reps
All values from NFL Combine

=== Arizona Cardinals ===
On April 27, 2010, the Arizona Cardinals signed 10 players, one of whom was the undrafted Orange.

=== Minnesota Vikings ===
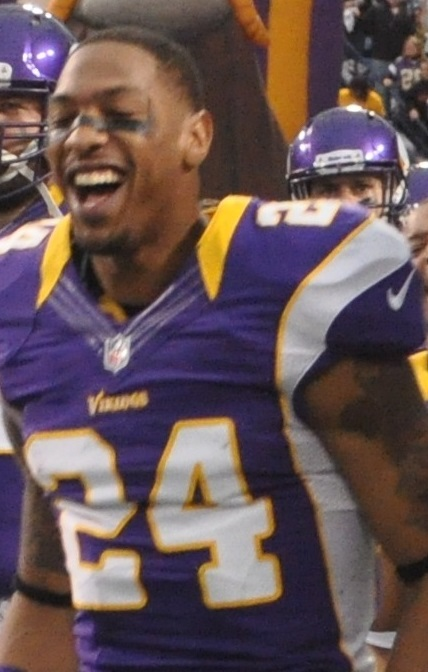
Orange in 2012.

On August 31, 2012, the Minnesota Vikings traded for Orange with the Cardinals for an undisclosed number of draft picks. This trade was later finalized with Arizona receiving one 6th round pick in the 2013 NFL draft (Tennessee's by way of Minnesota) in return for Orange and Arizona's 7th Round pick in 2013.

=== Seattle Seahawks ===
Orange signed with the Seattle Seahawks on May 2, 2014. The Seahawks placed him on injured reserve on August 26, 2014.

=== Toronto Argonauts ===
Orange signed with the Toronto Argonauts of the Canadian Football League (CFL) on May 26, 2015. In two seasons with the Argos he played in 30 games and accumulated 91 defensive tackles, 6 interceptions, 5 special teams tackles and 2 touchdowns. 1 being a punt return against the Winnipeg Blue Bombers. Following the 2016 season he was not re-signed by the Argonauts, rendering him a free-agent.

=== Ottawa Redblacks ===
On February 14, 2017, the first day of CFL free agency, Orange signed with the Ottawa Redblacks (CFL). He was released by the club only 3 games into the 2017 season.

=== Saskatchewan Roughriders ===
Orange signed with the Saskatchewan Roughriders (CFL) on July 18, 2017. He was released without playing a game on September 11, 2017.

=== Edmonton Eskimos ===
Following multiple injuries in their defensive secondary, the Edmonton Eskimos signed Orange on September 13, 2017.

=== BC Lions ===
Orange signed with the BC Lions on February 13, 2018, to a one-year contract. After a rough start to the season, including a 3–6 record and Orange committing a poorly timed penalty contributing to a loss, Orange stepped up his play, recording a career high in tackles, as well as interceptions with 5. The Lions finished the year by going 6–3, making the playoffs, and Orange was given both divisional and league All-Star recognition.

=== Edmonton Eskimos (II) ===
Upon reaching free agency, Orange returned to Edmonton for the 2019 season, one of numerous marquee free agents to sign in Edmonton. He was released on February 1, 2020.

=== NFL statistics ===
Year	Team	GP	COMB	TOTAL	AST	SACK	FF	FR	FR YDS	INT	IR YDS	AVG IR	LNG	TD	PD
2010	ARI	2	1	0	1	0.0	0	0	0	0	0	0	0	0	1
2011	ARI	16	66	60	6	0.0	0	0	0	1	0	0	0	0	12
2012	MIN	15	37	34	3	0.0	0	1	-2	0	0	0	0	0	5
2013	MIN	10	5	5	0	0.0	0	0	0	1	1	1	1	0	1
Career		43	109	99	10	0.0	0	1	0	2	1	1	1	0	19

== Domestic Violence ==
In November 2013, Orange was arrested for felony domestic assault by strangulation. Police were called to his home early in the morning after Orange reportedly strangled his girlfriend and subsequently threw her on the floor while yelling that she had ignored his text messages. Orange pleaded guilty to misdemeanor domestic assault and was sentenced to 90 days in jail, reduced to 3 days time served. Orange was released by the Minnesota Vikings on the day of his arrest but was signed by the Seattle Seahawks in May 2014 following his guilty plea.
