= Matt Darr =

American football player (born 1992)

No. 4, 8
- Position: Punter

Personal information
- Born: July 2, 1992 (age 34); Bakersfield, California, U.S.
- Listed height: 6 ft 1 in (1.85 m)
- Listed weight: 217 lb (98 kg)

Career information
- High school: Frontier (Bakersfield)
- College: Tennessee
- NFL draft: 2015: undrafted

Career history
- Miami Dolphins (2015−2016); Buffalo Bills (2018); New York Jets (2019)*
- * Offseason or practice squad member only

Awards and highlights
- PFWA All-Rookie Team (2015)

Career NFL statistics
- Punts: 202
- Punting yards: 9,180
- Average: 45.4
- Stats at Pro Football Reference

Matthew Darr (born July 2, 1992) is an American former professional football player who was a punter in the National Football League (NFL). He was signed by the Miami Dolphins as an undrafted free agent in 2015. He played college football for the Tennessee Volunteers.

== College career ==
Darr spent five seasons at Tennessee from 2010 to 2014 under head coaches Derek Dooley and Butch Jones.

== Professional career ==
Pre-draft measurables
Height	Weight	Arm length	Hand span	Wingspan	Bench press
6 ft 0 in (1.83 m)	216 lb (98 kg)	31 1/4 in (0.79 m)	9 in (0.23 m)	6 ft 4 in (1.93 m)	21 reps
All values from Pro Day

=== Miami Dolphins ===
Darr signed with the Miami Dolphins on May 2, 2015. He won the punting competition over veteran punter Brandon Fields. He was named to the PFWA All-Rookie Team.

On September 2, 2017, Darr was waived by the Dolphins.

=== Buffalo Bills ===
On November 27, 2018, Darr signed with the Buffalo Bills.

=== New York Jets ===
On May 20, 2019, Darr signed with the New York Jets. He was released on August 31, 2019.

== NFL career statistics ==
Season	Team	GP	Punting					
Season	Team	GP	Punts	Yards	Y/P	Net	In20	TB
2015	MIA	16	92	4,380	47.6	39.7	70	0
2016	MIA	16	90	3,991	44.3	39.9	66	0
2018	BUF	5	20	809	40.5	36.3	55	0
Career		37	202	9,180	45.4	39.5	70	0
