= Liberty High School (Bakersfield, California) =

Location
- 925 Jewetta Avenue; Bakersfield, California 93312; United States; 35°22′00″N 119°07′51″W

Information
- School type: Public
- Opened: August 30, 1999
- School district: Kern High School District
- Principal: Kenny Seals
- Teaching staff: 89.21 (FTE)
- Grades: 9th through 12th
- Enrollment: 2,355 (2023-2024)
- Student to teacher ratio: 26.40
- Campus type: Suburban
- Colours: Navy, red and silver
- Slogan: Patriot Pride and Excellence
- Athletics conference: South Yosemite River League
- Mascot: Patriot
- Yearbook: Legacy
- Website: liberty.kernhigh.org

Liberty High School is a public co-educational high school located in Bakersfield, California, United States. Its athletics teams are known as the Liberty Patriots and the school colors are navy, red, and silver. Liberty High School opened its doors in 1999. Liberty High School is currently the most populated high school in the Kern High School District with a student body of 2,801.

== Academics ==
All students enrolled at Liberty High School must meet the following criteria before graduation:

- 4 years of English (40 credits)
- 3 years of Social Studies (30 credits)
  - 1 year of World or European History
  - 1 year of U.S. History
  - 1 year of U.S. Government/Economics
- 3 years of Math (30 credits)
  - Algebra, Geometry, Advanced Algebra, Analysis or Statistics, and Calculus.
- 2 years of Science. (20 credits)
  - Integrated, Biology, Chemistry, Physics, Earth Science
- 2 years of P.E. (20 credits)
- 1 year of Foreign Language/Fine Arts (10 credits)
- 1 semester of Health (5 credits)
- Choice of Electives (65 credits)

TOTAL = 220 credits

Liberty High School offers AP, GATE, and Honor's courses, which students can take to earn college credit:

== Music department ==
=== The Liberty High School Marching Patriots ===
Founded by band director Jason Kuyper, the 120 member group has won many sweepstakes and 1st place awards in band competitions throughout California since its beginning in 1999. In 2002, the band competed in the Southern California School Band and Orchestra Association (SCSBOA) State Championships receiving 4th place overall in Division 4A. In 2004, the band competed in the Western Band Association (WBA) State Championships receiving 4th place overall in the 1A/2A/3A Division Finals with the colorguard claiming the High Sweepstakes award in Auxiliary. They also have a wind symphony, symphonic band, concert band, jazz band, percussion ensemble, and winterguard. The group currently hosts a Winter Guard International (WGI) regional championship in February, featuring many winterguard units from around the state of California.

=== Liberty Choral Program ===
The program contains Liberty Women's Chorale and Men's Chorale, Chamber Choir, and the school's major performing ensemble, Liberty Chorale. In September 2004, the Chorale joined with the Bakersfield Symphonic Orchestra to present the Concert of America tribute to the victims and survivors of the September 11 terrorist attacks.

In May 2007, the Liberty Chorale was invited to perform at Carnegie Hall in New York City. The Chorale, along with other choruses from around the world, formed a symphonic choir accompanied by the New England Symphonic Ensemble and conducted by composer and arranger Mark Hayes. The performance included the New York premiere of Mr. Hayes' "Te Deum" and a medley of his spirituals.

Since 2011, the Chamber Choir has performed operas on a biennial basis (The Mikado in 2011 and 2017, Pirates of Penzance in 2013, and The Merry Widow in 2015). However, following a three-year annual opera performance schedule (The Mikado in 2017, an original opera arranged by Williams in 2018, and The Gypsy Baron in 2019), the choir has chosen not to perform an opera in 2020.

== Liberty P.A.T.S. ==
The Liberty P.A.T.S. (Parents-Alumni-Teachers-Support) is the schools Parent Booster group that supports the educational, athletic, and extra-curricular endeavors of Liberty High School Students. Membership is open to all Liberty High School faculty and staff, parents and guardians of students currently enrolled and of alumni, and other members of the general public wishing to assist in the charitable and educational activities and function of the corporation.

=== Booster groups ===
- Band
- Baseball
- Cheer
- Choir
- Executive Board
- Football
- Men's Basketball
- Women's Basketball
- Women's Soccer
- Wrestling
- Men's Soccer

== Athletics ==
Liberty's sports teams are known as the Patriots. Liberty competed in the South Sequoia League in the CIF Central Section from August 1999 to June 2002. In August 2002 the school was promoted to compete in the Southeast Yosemite League in the CIF Central Section, then in August 2010 moved to the Southwest Yosemite League. In 2022, The School was moved to the South Yosemite River League

=== Football ===
Led by head coach Rick Van Horne and having seniors for the first time in the 2001 season, the team won its first League and Valley Championship in the program's short history, shocking the valley and beating Clovis East High School. The 2015 Liberty Patriots, led by head coach Bryan Nixon, and future Green Bay Packer teammates Jordan Love and Krys Barnes, won the program's second Valley Championship by beating Clovis High School (California) 56–21. The 2015 Patriots made their first state appearance in program history, losing to Del Oro High School 28–24. The Patriots won their 3rd Valley Championship in 2021, beating the Central Grizzlies. The Patriots went on to beat Pittsburg in the state semi finals, losing the following week against Serra for the State championship.

The program participates in annual bowl games with Centennial High School (Bakersfield, California) and Frontier High School (Bakersfield, California). The winner of the game keeps the bowl trophy at the school for an entire year until the next game the following season. Since its inception in the 2004 season, the Patriots are 14–4 in Freedom Bowl games against Centennial, with the last loss coming in 2009. Since its inception in 2010, the Patriots are 10–1 in Black and Blue games against Frontier, the only loss being in 2012.

The Liberty Patriots football team holds an overall record of 155–59.

=== Volleyball ===
The 2002 Girls' Volleyball Team won the CIF Division II Women's Volleyball State Championships.

=== Tennis ===
The Boys Tennis team won League titles in the SEYL in the 2009 and 2010 season, and recently took the title in 2011 in the newly formed and much more competitive SWYL league. The boys team also made it to the Division I Championship in 2011 where it faced Clovis West in an away game. The final score was 3 - 6 resulting in a Liberty loss, however the singles were tied at 3 - 3 in the first round.

=== Boys' soccer ===
The Boys Soccer team won League titles in the SEYL in 2004 and 2006 seasons, and recently took the title in 2011 and 2016 in the newly formed and much more competitive SWYL league. The boys made it to the Division I Championship in 2015 where they faced #10 in the nation Buchanan-Clovis in an away game. The final score was 0–1 at the end of 2OT resulting in a Liberty loss.

== Commencement ceremony ==
The commencement ceremony or graduation is held each year in late May or early June at Liberty Stadium on campus. The LHSMP play Pomp and Circumstance live during the commencement. The school's first graduating class was the class of 2002. The school's largest graduating class was the class of 2008.

== Notable alumni ==
- Quincy Amarikwa, former Major League Soccer player and 2010 MLS Cup champion for the Colorado Rapids. Currently a member of the Oakland Roots SC of the USL Championship.
- Krys Barnes, NFL linebacker.
- Jordan Love, current NFL Quarterback for the Green Bay Packers.
- Cole Mazza, former Los Angeles Chargers long snapper and member of the 2015 National Champion Alabama Crimson Tide.
- Colton Schmidt, former Buffalo Bills punter.
