= Rodney Leisle =

American gridiron football player (born 1981)

No. 75, 77, 95
- Position: Defensive tackle

Personal information
- Born: February 5, 1981 (age 45); Fresno, California, U.S.
- Listed height: 6 ft 3 in (1.91 m)
- Listed weight: 315 lb (143 kg)

Career information
- High school: Ridgeview (Bakersfield, California)
- College: UCLA
- NFL draft: 2004: 5th round, 139th overall pick

Career history
- New Orleans Saints (2004–2006); New York Giants (2008)*; Saskatchewan Roughriders (2008); Arizona Cardinals (2009)*; New Orleans Saints (2009)
- * Offseason or practice squad member only

Awards and highlights
- Super Bowl champion (XLIV); Second-team All-Pac-10 (2001)

Career NFL statistics
- Tackles: 18
- Stats at Pro Football Reference

Rodney Allen Leisle (born February 5, 1981) is an American former professional football player who was a defensive tackle in the National Football League (NFL). He was selected by the New Orleans Saints in the fifth round of the 2004 NFL draft. He attended Ridgeview High School in Bakersfield, California and played college football for the UCLA Bruins.

Leisle was also a member of the New York Giants, Saskatchewan Roughriders and Arizona Cardinals.

== Professional career ==
Leisle played in 18 games for the New Orleans Saints and appeared in one game for his last season with Saints before being placed on injured reserve with a knee injury. Saints cut Leisle in their 2007 training camp.

Leisle resurfaced with the New York Giants during their training camp in 2008, but sustained a season ending rib injury before season started. He spent some time in Canadian football with the Saskatchewan Roughriders during their 2008 season. He competed for a roster spot during Arizona Cardinals training camp in 2009.

Lesile was signed again to the Saints in 2009 before being released again in 2010.
