= Stockdale High School (Bakersfield, California) =

Location
- 2800 Buena Vista Rd. Bakersfield, California; 35°19′34″N 119°07′35″W

Information
- School type: Senior High School
- Established: 1991
- School district: Kern High School District
- Principal: Erika Pierce
- Teaching staff: 87.53 (FTE)
- Grades: 9 to 12
- Enrollment: 2,313 (2023-2024)
- Student to teacher ratio: 26.43
- Colors: Black, silver, and white
- Slogan: "Branded By Excellence"
- Mascot: Mustangs
- Rival: Bakersfield High School, Centennial High School, Garces Memorial High School
- Yearbook: The Silverado
- Website: stockdale.kernhigh.org

Stockdale High School (SHS) is an American senior high school located in Bakersfield, California. Its athletics teams are known as the Stockdale Mustangs and the school colors are black and silver. Stockdale High School first opened in 1991. Now in its 28th year, with approximately 2,069 students enrolled, Stockdale has an API of 831. Sixty-four sections of GATE, Honors, and Advanced Placement classes are offered for the college-bound. For students interested in career pathways, eight courses are offered, including Agricultural Science and Technology, Applied Engineering and Design, Computer and Commercial Graphics, Computer Science and Information Systems, Accounting and Finance, Medicine (M.A.S.H., the Medical Academy of Stockdale High), Virtual Business Enterprise, and Construction Technology. The school motto is "Branded by Excellence." In 2010, Newsweek ranked Stockdale among the top 6 percent of all public schools in the United States.

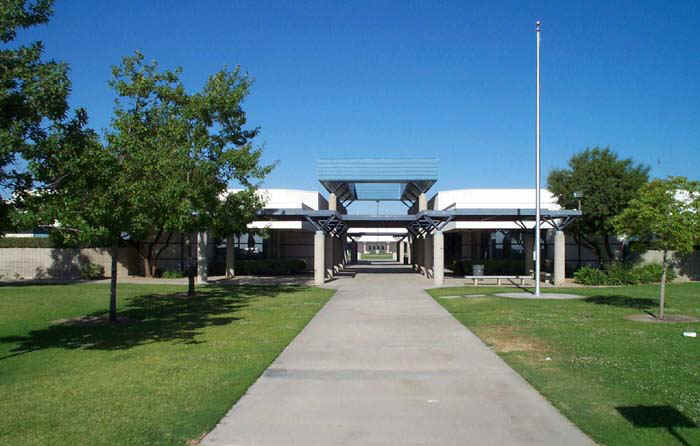
Stockdale High School campus entrance

== Notable alumni ==
- David Carr, former quarterback for the Houston Texans, and first overall pick. Now retired.
- Grant Desme, centerfielder at Cal Poly San Luis Obispo (Big West Conference Player of the Year); drafted in 2007 by the Oakland Athletics; retired in 2010 after being named Arizona Fall League MVP, to enter a Catholic seminary to study for the priesthood.
- Casey Mears, NASCAR driver
- Cory Hall, former NFL free safety for the Cincinnati Bengals attended Stockdale High School his freshman through junior year before transferring to South High School.
- Sam Betty, European basketball star and stand-out two-sport Division III-A athlete at Occidental College

== District ==
Stockdale High School is a part of the Kern High School District, one of the largest high school districts in the state of California. Stockdale High's boundaries cover much of the southwest corner of Bakersfield, California.

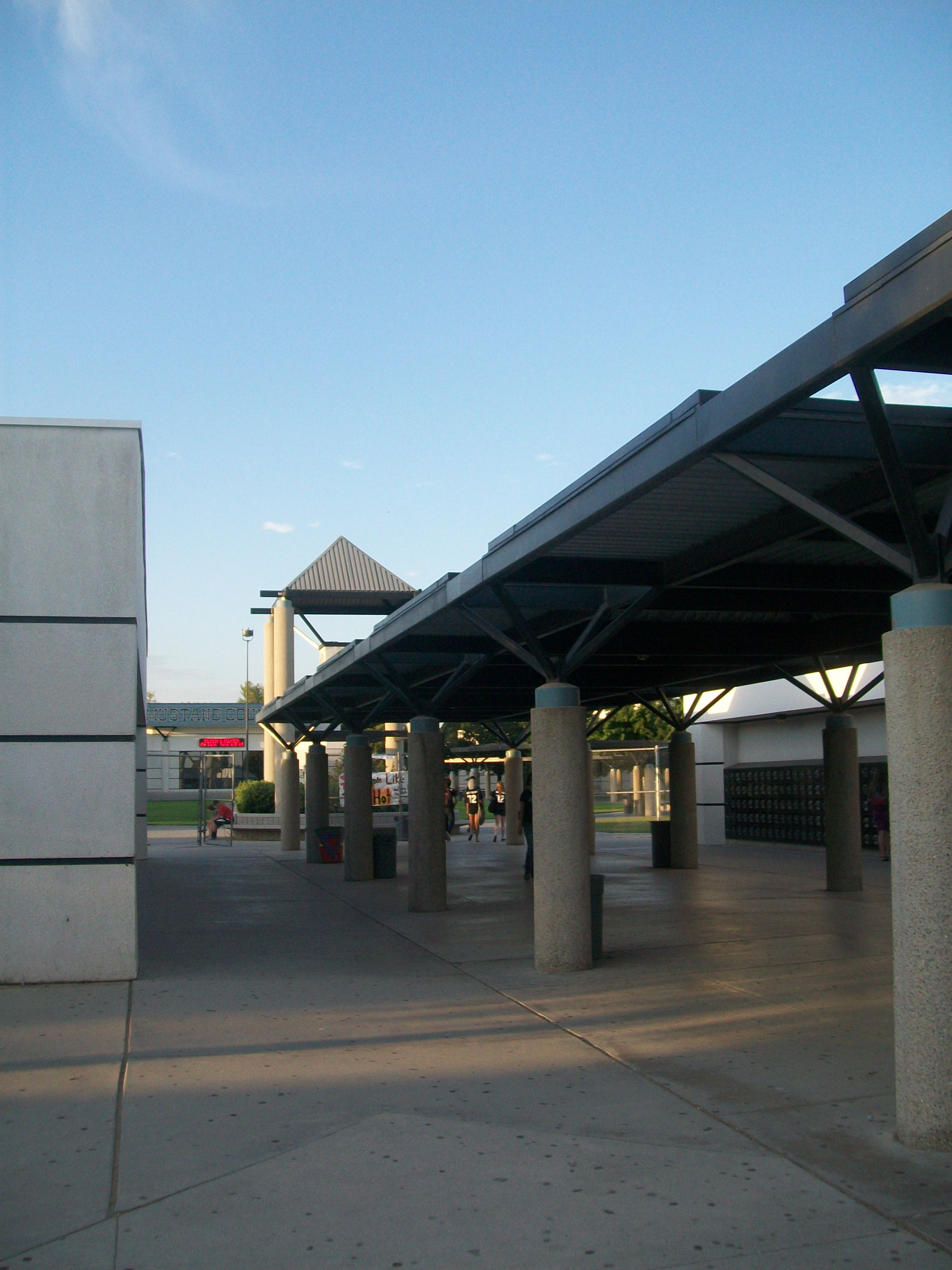
"The Spine", the school's main hallway
