= Jon Baker (placekicker) =

American gridiron football player (born 1972)

No. 10, 9, 18, 12, 14
- Position: Placekicker

Personal information
- Born: August 13, 1972 (age 54); Bakersfield, California, U.S.
- Listed height: 6 ft 1 in (1.85 m)
- Listed weight: 185 lb (84 kg)

Career information
- High school: Foothill (Bakersfield)
- College: Arizona State
- NFL draft: 1995: undrafted

Career history
- Dallas Cowboys (1995); San Francisco 49ers (1996–1997)*; Miami Dolphins (1998)*; → Scottish Claymores (1998); Edmonton Eskimos (1999); Kansas City Chiefs (1999); BC Lions (2000); Edmonton Eskimos (2001); Bakersfield Blitz (2002–2003)
- * Offseason or practice squad member only

Awards and highlights
- Super Bowl champion (XXX); Second-team All-Pac-10 (1994)

Career NFL statistics
- Games played: 5
- Stats at Pro Football Reference

Career CFL statistics
- Games played: 14

Jonathan David Baker (born August 13, 1972) is an American former professional football player who was a placekicker in the National Football League (NFL) for the Dallas Cowboys and Kansas City Chiefs. He also was a member of the Edmonton Eskimos and BC Lions of the Canadian Football League (CFL). He played college football for the Arizona State Sun Devils.

== Early life ==
Baker attended Foothill High School, where he lettered in football, soccer, track and basketball. In football, he was a two-time All-South Yosemite League selection, playing at kicker and quarterback.

He enrolled at Bakersfield Community College. As a freshman, he made 2 field goals of over 50 yards and hit a game winner with 0:01 seconds left.

Baker transferred to Arizona State University after his sophomore season. As a junior, he began kicking barefoot. He made 18-of-26 field goals and 26-of-26 point after attempts for 80 points.

As a senior, he made 17-of-24 field goals and 23-of-24 extra point attempts for 74 points. He received Pac-10 Special Teams Player of the Week twice. He made 3 field goals in a game three times. At the time, only Luis Zendejas had made more field goals in a season for Arizona State than Baker.

== Professional career ==
Baker was signed as an undrafted free agent by the Dallas Cowboys after the 1995 NFL draft. After placekicker Chris Boniol missed the first three preseason games with a pulled quadriceps in his right leg, the Cowboys were forced to make the unconventional move of keeping Baker as a kickoff specialist. He played in three games and was released on September 19.

On May 16, 1996, he signed as a free agent with the San Francisco 49ers. He was cut on July 18. On April 2, 1997, he was re-signed by the 49ers. He was limited with groin and heel injuries. On August 15, he was released after not being able to pass Gary Anderson on the depth chart.

On February 18, 1998, he was signed by the Miami Dolphins and allocated to the Scottish Claymores of NFL Europe. He made 6-of-7 field goals, while the extra points were kicked by Scottish rugby player Gary Parker. He was released by the Dolphins before the start of the season on August 8.

In 1999, he played in eight games with the Edmonton Eskimos of the Canadian Football League. He made 20-of-28 field-goal attempts and led the league with a 60.5-yard average per kickoff. He was released to make room for Sean Fleming, who returned from the Kansas City Chiefs of the NFL.

On December 21, 1999, he was signed as a free agent by the Chiefs, to be the team's kickoff specialist. He hit 3 kickoffs out of bounds in the season finale against the Oakland Raiders, which contributed to a 41–38 overtime loss. A win would have given the Chiefs the AFC West championship and a playoff berth. He wasn't re-signed after the season.

In June 2000, he signed with the B.C. Lions of the CFL, handling the kickoffs and long range field goals, while Lui Passaglia attempted most of the field goal. He played in five games, until being released to make room for placekicker Dan Giancola on August 9.

On October 22, 2001, he signed with the Eskimos to replace an injured Sean Fleming. He played in one game, missing one field goal and had another one blocked. He was released on October 28.

On May 23, 2002, he was signed by the Bakersfield Blitz of the af2. In 2003, he set a league regular season record with a 54-yard field goal.
