= Bruce Sarver =

American racing driver (1962–2005)

Bruce Sarver (January 11, 1962 – November 10, 2005) was an NHRA Top Fuel and Funny Car driver from 1996 to 2002.

Born in Bakersfield, California, he began racing Top Fuel in the Car Quest Auto Parts dragster. In his rookie season, he qualified for 18 out of 19 events. The next season, he made it to his first final in Englishtown. He switched to the Funny Car class in 2000 to join Foxen Canyon with Alan Johnson (the tuner) and Gary Scelzi. He opened the 2001 season with a win in Phoenix, and ended the season with a sixth-place points finish. In 2002, he came in mid-season when the team made a pioneering switch to a Toyota Celica funny car body.

Sarver committed suicide by a gunshot on November 10, 2005.
