= West High School (Bakersfield, California) =

Location
- 1200 New Stine Road; Bakersfield, California 93309; United States; 35°20′35″N 119°03′33″W

Information
- Established: 1965
- School district: Kern High School District
- Principal: Stephen Granucci
- Teaching staff: 73.15 (FTE)
- Enrollment: 2,090 (2023-2024)
- Student to teacher ratio: 28.57
- Colors: Green and Gold
- Athletics conference: CIF Central Section South Yosemite Mountain League
- Mascot: Viking
- Rivals: East Bakersfield, South, North High School
- Yearbook: Valhalla
- Website: School website

West High School is a public high school located in Bakersfield, California, United States. The school serves about 2,000 students in grades 9 to 12 in the Kern High School District.

The school has been accredited by the Western Association of Schools and Colleges—for the first time in 1969 and most recently in 2020, for a fixed term after each evaluation.

== Notable alumni ==
- Nikki Blue, former UCLA and WNBA basketball player
- Vince Fong, member of the United States House of Representatives from California's 20th congressional district
- A.J. Jefferson, now known as Anthony Orange, football player; undrafted rookie cornerback for the Minnesota Vikings
- Brock Marion, football player, NFL defensive back, 1993-2004
- Ryan Mathews, football player; first-round selection and 12th overall pick in the 2010 NFL draft; San Diego Chargers, NFL running back
