= Foothill High School (Bakersfield, California) =

Location
- 501 Park Drive; Bakersfield, California 93306
- Coordinates: 35°21′58″N 118°55′05″W

Information
- Type: Public
- Established: 1962; 64 years ago
- School district: Kern High School District
- Principal: Sydney Peterson
- Teaching staff: 86.87 (FTE)
- Enrollment: 2,063 (2023–2024)
- Student to teacher ratio: 23.75
- Colors: Black, gold, and white
- Mascot: Trojan
- Yearbook: Aurora
- Information: (661) 366-4491
- Website: http://foothill.kernhigh.org/

Foothill High School is located in Bakersfield, California and serves grades 9–12.

== Accomplishments ==
Their speech and debate team won the State Championship (small schools) in 2004.

In 2010, the "We The People" team made it to state for the first time in the school's history. Although they did not make it to the final rounds in the capital, Unit 4 of the team received a Unit award out of the remaining 7 schools.

On May 30, 2013, Foothill High School had their fiftieth commencement ceremony; the 2013 graduating class received a commemorative trophy and one-of-a-kind diploma covers with the school's golden anniversary Trojan emblem.

== Notable alumni ==
- Jon Baker, NFL and CFL player
- Chris Childs, former New York Knicks guard
- Joey Porter - NFL Player - Pittsburgh Steelers, Miami Dolphins, Arizona Cardinals
- Rashaan Shehee - NFL running back
- Lonnie Shelton - NBA Player - New York Knicks, Seattle SuperSonics, Cleveland Cavaliers 1982 all-star
