= South High School (Bakersfield, California) =

High school in Bakersfield, California, USA

Location
- 1101 Planz Road; Bakersfield, California 93304; United States; 35°19′25″N 119°00′53″W

Information
- Type: Public high school
- Established: 1957; 69 years ago
- School district: Kern High School District
- Teaching staff: 92.93 (FTE)
- Grades: 9-12
- Enrollment: 2,150 (2023-2024)
- Student to teacher ratio: 23.14
- Colors: Columbia Blue, Gray
- Mascot: Spartans
- Yearbook: Merrimac
- Website: School website

South High School is located in the Kern County District of Bakersfield, California. The school has approximately 2,150 students.

== History ==
The official South High School website states that the school was originally founded in 1957 and was surrounded by farmlands.

As of May 7, 2021 the school mascot is known as the “Spartans” following a year long review committee determination examine the prior mascot Rebel Man or Johnny Rebel which was patterned after a Confederate soldier. Sports teams formerly referred to as the Rebels, will now be known as the Spartans.

=== Athletics ===
The school offers a variety of sports that include: baseball, swimming, dance, flag, golf, wrestling, tennis, cross-country running, soccer, basketball, softball, volleyball, and football. In 2015–2016, the Varsity boys soccer team won the CIF Southern California Regional Championships for Division II.

South High celebrated its 50th anniversary and homecoming on September 29, 2007. The South High football team also hosted their 50th homecoming football game against the Shafter Generals, with South High winning 41–12.

=== Clubs ===
Clubs on campus include forensics, JROTC, and ROC.

South High is also home to the prestigious MS^{3} program, the brand new South High Justice Academy, the AVID program, and an award-winning Rebel Regiment Band and Color-guard.

== Notable alumni ==
- Winston Crite, NBA player, played for Texas A&M University
- Natalie Dunn, first American woman to win the world championship in figure roller-skating in 1976
- Brent McClanahan, former running back for the Minnesota Vikings, 1973–1979
- Rick Mears, retired American race car driver and four-time Indy 500 winner
- David Silveria, former drummer of the band Korn
- Jennifer L. Thurston, judge who is a United States district judge of the United States District Court for the Eastern District of California
