= Independence High School (Bakersfield, California) =

Location
- 8001 Old River Road; Bakersfield, California 93311
- 35°16′58″N 119°6′40″W

Information
- School type: High School
- Established: August 18, 2008
- School district: Kern High School District
- Principal: Guillermo Alvarado
- Teaching staff: 89.51 (FTE)
- Grades: 9-12
- Enrollment: 2,334 (2023-2024)
- Student to teacher ratio: 26.08
- Campus type: Suburban
- Colors: Maroon and Silver
- Slogan: RISE
- Athletics conference: South Yosemite Valley League
- Mascot: Falcon
- Team name: Falcons

Independence High School is a public, co-educational high school located in Bakersfield, California. Its athletics are known as the Independence Falcons and the school colors are maroon and silver. Independence High School had their first class in 2008, with the first graduating class in 2011. The first all four year graduating class graduated in 2012. The school is well known for hosting The Ready Set and Carly Rae Jepsen as a school spirit competition win from Kelly 95.3. It currently contains an approximate 1,900 of students and staff.

== Notable alumni ==
- D. J. Reed (2014), American football player
