= 2017 Oklahoma Sooners football team =

Oklahoma Sooners college football season

2017 Oklahoma Sooners football

Big 12 champion

Big 12 Championship, W 41–17 vs. TCU

Rose Bowl (CFP Semifinal), L 48–54 ^{2OT} vs. Georgia
- Conference: Big 12 Conference

Ranking
- Coaches: No. 3
- AP: No. 3
- Record: 12–2 (8–1 Big 12)
- Head coach: Lincoln Riley (1st season)
- Co-offensive coordinators: Cale Gundy (1st season); Bill Bedenbaugh (1st season)
- Offensive scheme: Air raid
- Defensive coordinator: Mike Stoops (11th season)
- Base defense: 3–4
- Captains: Orlando Brown Jr.; Baker Mayfield; Ogbonnia Okoronkwo; Steven Parker
- Home stadium: Gaylord Family Oklahoma Memorial Stadium

2017 Big 12 Conference football standings
	Conf.			Overall
Team	W		L	W		L
No. 3 Oklahoma y$^	8	–	1	12	–	2
No. 9 TCU y	7	–	2	11	–	3
No. 14 Oklahoma State	6	–	3	10	–	3
Texas	5	–	4	7	–	6
West Virginia	5	–	4	7	–	6
Kansas State	5	–	4	8	–	5
Iowa State	5	–	4	8	–	5
Texas Tech	3	–	6	6	–	7
Baylor	1	–	8	1	–	11
Kansas	0	–	9	1	–	11
Championship: Oklahoma 41, TCU 17
^ – College Football Playoff participant; $ – Conference champion; y – Championship game participant; Rankings from AP Poll

The 2017 Oklahoma Sooners football team represented the University of Oklahoma in the 2017 NCAA Division I FBS football season, the 123rd season of Sooner football. The team was led by Lincoln Riley, who was in his first year as head coach, after the retirement of Bob Stoops in June 2017. They played their home games at Gaylord Family Oklahoma Memorial Stadium in Norman, Oklahoma. They are a charter member of the Big 12 Conference.

Conference play began with a 49–41 win against Baylor in Waco, Texas and ended with a 59–31 win against West Virginia in Norman, Oklahoma. Oklahoma finished conference play with the best record in the conference with an 8–1 record. They went on to play TCU in the 2017 Big 12 Championship Game which they won 41–17 to win their twelfth Big 12 Championship and their third consecutive.

Oklahoma was selected as the 2nd seed to play in the 2017 College Football Playoff and lost to the 3rd seed Georgia in the Rose Bowl 48–54 in double overtime.

Sooners quarterback Baker Mayfield earned several national honors, including winning the school's sixth Heisman Trophy, distinguishing him as the best player in college football during the 2017 season. Mayfield threw for 4,627 yards and 43 passing touchdowns on the year, second in FBS in both categories. He broke his own NCAA FBS record for passing efficiency rating with a rating of 198.9.

== Coaching staff ==
On June 7, 2017 Bob Stoops announced his retirement after 17 seasons as head coach. Offensive coordinator Lincoln Riley was promoted to head coach. On June 14, Riley hired former ECU head coach Ruffin McNeill to coach defensive tackles. With the offensive coordinator positions vacant Riley promoted Cale Gundy and Bill Bedenbaugh as co-coordinators, but Riley will continue to call plays for the season.

Name	Position	Alma mater	Joined staff
Lincoln Riley	Head Coach / quarterbacks	Texas Tech (2006)	2015/2017
Mike Stoops	Defensive Coordinator / Outside Linebackers	Iowa (1986)	1999/2012
Cale Gundy	Co-offensive coordinator/ Inside Wide Receivers Coach / recruiting coordinator	Oklahoma (1994)	1999
Bill Bedenbaugh	Co-offensive coordinator / Offensive Line coach	Iowa Wesleyan (1995)	2013
Jay Boulware	Special Team Coordinator / running backs coach	Texas (1996)	2013
Kerry Cooks	Assistant defensive coordinator / defensive backs coach	Iowa (1993)	2015
Ruffin McNeill	Assistant Head Coach / Defensive tackles	East Carolina (1980)	2017
Tim Kish	Inside Linebackers coach	Otterbein (1976)	2012
Dennis Simmons	Outside Wide Receivers coach	BYU (1997)	2015
Calvin Thibodeaux	Defensive Ends coach	Oklahoma (2006)	2016
Jerry Schmidt	Director of Sports Enhancement	Nebraska (1986)	1999
Matt McMillen	Assistant A.D. Football Operations	Kansas State (1985)	1999
Jamarkus McFarland	Graduate assistant	Oklahoma (2013)	2016

== Roster ==
2017 Oklahoma Sooners football team roster
Players
Coaches
Offense

Pos.	#	Name	Class
QB	1	Kyler Murray	So
WR	2	Jeff Badet	Sr
WR	3	Mykel Jones	So
QB	3	Connor McGinnis	So
RB	4	Trey Sermon	Fr
WR	5	Marquise Brown	So
QB	6	Baker Mayfield	Sr
WR	9	CeeDee Lamb	Fr
QB	9	Tanner Schafer	Fr
QB	10	Austin Kendall	So
WR	11	Charleston Rambo	Fr
WR	13	A.D. Miller	Jr
QB	14	Reece Clark	So
WR	15	Jeffery Mead	Sr
WR	17	Jordan Smallwood	Sr
RB	20	Najee Bissoon	Sr
RB	21	Marcelias Sutton	Jr
RB	23	Abdul Adams	So
RB	24	Rodney Anderson	So
RB	26	Kennedy Brooks	Fr
FB	27	Jeremiah Hall	Fr
WR	28	Reggie Turner	Jr
FB	29	Joe Castiglione Jr.	So
RB	31	Grant Ward	Fr
FB	36	Dimitri Flowers	Sr
FB	44	Jaxson Uhles	Sr
FB	45	Carson Meier	Jr
OL	54	Marquis Hayes	Fr
OL	55	Logan Roberson	Fr
OL	56	Creed Humphrey	Fr
OL	58	Erick Wren	Sr
OL	59	Adrian Ealy	Fr
OL	62	Tyrese Robinson	Fr
OL	63	Alex Dalton	Jr
OL	67	Ashton Julious	Sr
OL	68	Jonathan Alvarez	Sr
OL	71	Bobby Evans	So
OL	72	Ben Powers	Jr
OL	73	Quinn Mittermeier	Jr
OL	74	Cody Ford	So
OL	75	Dru Samia	Jr
OL	77	Erik Swenson	Fr
OL	78	Orlando Brown Jr.	Jr
OL	79	Dwayne Orso-Bacchus	Jr
TE	80	Grant Calcaterra	Fr
TE	81	Mark Andrews	Jr
WR	83	Nick Basquine	Jr
WR	84	Lee Morris	So
WR	85	Sam Iheke	So
WR	86	Carlos Hishaw	So
WR	87	Myles Tease	Jr
WR	88	Chase Nevel	Jr
WR	89	Malik Bradshaw	So

Defense

Pos.	#	Name	Class
DB	1	Jordan Parker	So
DB	6	Tre Brown	Fr
LB	6	Levi Draper	Fr
DB	7	Jordan Thomas	Sr
DB	8	Kahlil Haughton	Jr
LB	9	Kenneth Murray	Fr
DB	10	Steven Parker	Sr
DB	11	Parnell Motley	So
DB	12	Will Johnson	Sr
DB	13	Tre Norwood	Fr
LB	14	Emmanuel Beal	Sr
DL	16	K'Jakyre Daley	Fr
LB	18	Curtis Bolton	Jr
LB	19	Caleb Kelly	So
DB	20	Robert Barnes	Fr
LB	22	Ricky DeBerry	So
DB	25	Justin Broiles	Fr
DB	28	Chanse Sylvie	So
DB	29	Prentice McKinney	Jr
LB	31	Ogbonnia Okoronkwo	Sr
DB	32	Caleb Nettles	Fr
DB	33	Ryan Jones	Fr
LB	36	Josh Schenck	Fr
LB	38	Bryan Mead	Fr
DB	39	Tylon Lynch	Jr
LB	40	Jon-Michael Terry	Fr
DL	42	Mark Jackson Jr.	So
DL	50	Arthur McGinnis	So
LB	52	Beau Trousdale	Fr
DL	55	Kenneth Mann	So
DL	57	Du'Vonta Lampkin	So
DL	72	Amani Bledsoe	So
DL	87	D.J. Ward	Sr
DL	90	Neville Gallimore	So
DL	91	Dillon Faamatau	So
DL	92	Matt Romar	Sr
DL	93	Tyreece Lott	Fr
DL	94	Troy James	Fr
DL	95	Isaiah Thomas	Fr
DL	97	Marquise Overton	So
DL	98	Zacchaeus McKinney	Fr

Special teams

Pos.	#	Name	Class
K	30	Calum Sutherland	Fr
K/P	37	Kyle Pfau	Jr
K	38	Cameron Mortazavi	Jr
LS	42	Wesley Horky	Sr
K/P	43	Austin Seibert	Jr
P	46	Reeves Mundschau	Fr
K	47	Reece Morrison	Fr
K	48	Nick Horiates	Fr
LS	51	Kasey Kelleher	Fr

Head coach

- Lincoln Riley – Quarterbacks

Coordinators/assistant coaches

- Cale Gundy – Co-offensive coordinator/inside receivers/recruiting coordinator
- Bill Bedenbaugh – Co-offensive coordinator/offensive line
- Ruffin McNeil – Assistant head coach/co-defensive coordinator
- Mike Stoops – Co-defensive coordinator
- Kerry Cooks – Assistant defensive coordinator/defensive backs
- Jay Boulware – Special Teams coordinator/running backs
- Dennis Simmons – Outside Wide Receivers
- Calvin Thibodeaux – Defensive ends
- Tim Kish – Inside linebackers
- Scott Sinclair – Director, Sports Management
- Jamarkus McFarland – Graduate assistant

Legend

- (C) Team captain
- (S) Suspended
- (I) Ineligible
- Injured
- Redshirt

Roster
Last update: 10/31/18

== Schedule ==
Oklahoma announced their 2017 football schedule on December 13, 2016. The 2017 schedule consisted of 6 home games, 5 away games and 1 neutral-site game in the regular season. The Sooners hosted two non-conference games against UTEP and Tulane and traveled to Ohio State. Oklahoma hosted Iowa State, Texas Tech, TCU, West Virginia and traveled to Baylor, Kansas, Kansas State, Oklahoma State in regular conference play. Oklahoma played the Texas Longhorns in Dallas, Texas at the Cotton Bowl stadium on October 14 for the Red River Showdown, the 112th game of the series.

Date	Time	Opponent	Rank	Site	TV	Result	Attendance
September 2	2:30 p.m.	UTEP*	No. 7	Gaylord Family Oklahoma Memorial Stadium; Norman, OK	FOX	W 56–7	86,076
September 9	6:30 p.m.	at No. 2 Ohio State*	No. 5	Ohio Stadium; Columbus, OH (College GameDay)	ABC	W 31–16	109,088
September 16	5:00 p.m.	Tulane*	No. 2	Gaylord Family Oklahoma Memorial Stadium; Norman, OK	FSN PPV	W 56–14	86,290
September 23	5:30 p.m.	at Baylor	No. 3	McLane Stadium; Waco, TX	FS1	W 49–41	43,573
October 7	11:00 a.m.	Iowa State	No. 3	Gaylord Family Oklahoma Memorial Stadium; Norman, OK	FOX	L 31–38	86,019
October 14	2:30 p.m.	vs. Texas	No. 12	Cotton Bowl Stadium; Dallas, TX (Red River Showdown)	ESPN	W 29–24	93,552
October 21	3:00 p.m.	at Kansas State	No. 9	Bill Snyder Family Stadium; Manhattan, KS	FOX	W 42–35	52,122
October 28	7:00 p.m.	Texas Tech^{†}	No. 10	Gaylord Family Oklahoma Memorial Stadium; Norman, OK	ABC/ESPN2	W 49–27	86,309
November 4	3:00 p.m.	at No. 11 Oklahoma State	No. 5	Boone Pickens Stadium; Stillwater, OK (Bedlam Series) (College GameDay)	FS1	W 62–52	56,790
November 11	7:00 p.m.	No. 6 TCU	No. 5	Gaylord Family Oklahoma Memorial Stadium; Norman, OK	FOX	W 38–20	88,308
November 18	2:30 p.m.	at Kansas	No. 4	Memorial Stadium; Lawrence, KS	ESPN	W 41–3	22,854
November 25	2:45 p.m.	West Virginia	No. 4	Gaylord Family Oklahoma Memorial Stadium; Norman, OK	ESPN	W 59–31	86,117
December 2	11:30 a.m.	vs. No. 11 TCU	No. 3	AT&T Stadium; Arlington, TX (Big 12 Championship Game)	FOX	W 41–17	64,104
January 1, 2018	4:00 p.m.	vs. No. 3 Georgia*	No. 2	Rose Bowl; Pasadena, CA (Rose Bowl–CFP Semifinal) (College GameDay)	ESPN	L 48–54 ^{2OT}	92,844
*Non-conference game; ^{†}Homecoming; Rankings from AP Poll and CFP Rankings after October 31 released prior to game; All times are in Central time

== Game summaries ==
=== UTEP ===
UTEP at No. 7 Oklahoma – Game summary

Quarter	1	2	3	4	Total
UTEP	7	0	0	0	7
No. 7 Oklahoma	14	21	14	7	56

at Gaylord Family Oklahoma Memorial Stadium • Norman, OK

- Date: September 2, 2017
- Game time: 2:36 p.m. CDT
- Game weather: Temperature: 86 °F (30 °C) • Wind:S6MPH • Weather: Mostly Sunny
- Game attendance: 86,076
- Referee: Reggie Smith
- TV announcers (FOX): Joe Davis (Play-By-Play), Brady Quinn (Color) & Bruce Feldman (Sideline)

To start the 2017 season, No. 7 Oklahoma hosted UTEP at home. It was Lincoln Riley's first game as head coach of the Sooners. Quarterback Baker Mayfield shined in a 56–7 rout of the Miners. Each team scored touchdowns on their first drives of the game, but Oklahoma shut out UTEP the rest of the way. Mayfield completed 19 of 20 passes, including 16 straight completions to start the game. He threw for 329 yards and three touchdowns in the game. Wide receiver Mark Andrews had a career high 134 receiving yards and seven receptions, all in the first half.

=== at Ohio State ===
No. 5 Oklahoma at No. 2 Ohio State – Game summary

Quarter	1	2	3	4	Total
No. 5 Oklahoma	0	3	14	14	31
No. 2 Ohio State	0	3	10	3	16

at Ohio Stadium • Columbus, OH

- Date: September 9, 2017
- Game time: 6:47 p.m. CDT
- Game weather: Temperature: 69 °F (21 °C) • Wind:NNE 8MPH • Weather:Partly Cloudy
- Game attendance: 109,088
- Referee: Mike Defee
- TV announcers (ABC): Chris Fowler (Play-by-Play), Kirk Herbstreit (Color) & Maria Taylor (Sideline)

For the second game of the season, the No. 5 Sooners traveled to Columbus, Ohio for a highly anticipated matchup against No. 2 Ohio State, a game which many pundits speculated would have College Football Playoff implications. The previous season, Ohio State beat Oklahoma in Norman by a score of 45–24. Oklahoma was a 7.5-point underdog in the 2017 match-up according to Las Vegas sports books.

Both teams were held scoreless through the first quarter, and exchanged field goals for a 3–3 tie going into halftime. Each team scored touchdowns on their first drives of the second half, with Ohio State's J. K. Dobbins capping a 44-yard drive with a six-yard touchdown run, and Oklahoma answered with a 67-yard drive of their own which ended with a 36-yard touchdown pass from Baker Mayfield to Dimitri Flowers. Oklahoma scored two more unanswered touchdowns in the second half to take a 31–13 lead before a late Ohio State field goal made the final score 31–16. Baker Mayfield finished the game with 27 pass completions on 35 attempts, with 386 yards and three touchdowns. After the game, Mayfield sprinted around the Ohio State field with an Oklahoma flag before planting the flag at midfield.

=== Tulane ===
Tulane at No. 2 Oklahoma – Game summary

Quarter	1	2	3	4	Total
Tulane	14	0	0	0	14
No. 2 Oklahoma	14	14	7	21	56

at Gaylord Family Oklahoma Memorial Stadium • Norman, OK

- Date: September 16, 2017
- Game time: 5:05 p.m. CDT
- Game weather: Temperature: 90 °F (32 °C) • Wind:S12MPH • Weather: Mostly Cloudy
- Game attendance: 86,290
- Referee: Dan Romeo
- TV announcers (FSOK PPV): Brendan Burke (Play-by-play), Dave Anderson (color) & Christian Steckel (sideline)

Following the victory over Ohio State, No. 2 Oklahoma hosted Tulane in the first ever match-up between the two schools. The two teams were tied in the second quarter 14–14 before Oklahoma's Parnell Motley returned an interception 77 yards for a touchdown, after which the Sooners' coasted to a 56–14 victory. Quarterback Baker Mayfield passed for 331 yards and four touchdowns, while wide receiver CeeDee Lamb had 131 receiving yards and two touchdowns in the game.

=== at Baylor ===
No. 3 Oklahoma at Baylor – Game summary

Quarter	1	2	3	4	Total
No. 3 Oklahoma	21	7	7	14	49
Baylor	7	10	14	10	41

at McLane Stadium • Waco, TX

- Date: September 23, 2017
- Game time: 5:42 p.m. CDT
- Game weather: Temperature: 93 °F (34 °C) • Wind:SE 10-15 MPH • Weather: Few Clouds
- Game attendance: 43,573
- Referee: Brad Van Vark
- TV announcers (FS1): Justin Kutcher, Mark Helfrich, Petros Papadakis

Oklahoma opened its Big 12 Conference schedule with a road game against Baylor. The Sooners were nearly upset by the Bears, who were winless with a record of 0–3 going into the game. The Bears scored a touchdown with 1:41 remaining in the game to bring the score to 49–41. Baylor recovered the onside kick and needed to score a touchdown to tie the game in the closing minutes. Bears quarterback Zach Smith fumbled the ball on the third play of the drive after being sacked by Oklahoma's Ogbonnia Okoronkwo, which was recovered by the Sooners, allowing them to run out the clock and win the game. Oklahoma's Abdul Adams had a 99-yard rushing touchdown in the first quarter, and had 164 rushing yards total in the game. Baker Mayfield threw for 283 yards and three touchdowns.

=== Iowa State ===
Iowa State at No. 3 Oklahoma – Game summary

Quarter	1	2	3	4	Total
Iowa State	3	10	11	14	38
No. 3 Oklahoma	14	10	0	7	31

at Gaylord Family Oklahoma Memorial Stadium • Norman, OK

- Date: October 7, 2017
- Game time: 11:05 a.m. CDT
- Game weather: Temperature: 68 °F (20 °C) • Wind:NW 10 MPH • Weather:Sunny
- Game attendance: 86,019
- Referee: Reggie Smith
- TV announcers (FOX): Brian Custer, Ben Leber, Jennifer Hale

After a bye week, Oklahoma played their second Big 12 Conference game, a home game against Iowa State. The Sooners were upset by the 31-point underdog Cyclones, 31–38. The game snapped Oklahoma's nation-leading 14 game win-streak, and 18-game win streak over Iowa State dating back to 1990. Iowa State backup quarterback Kyle Kempt, who had just two career pass attempts before this game, led the Cyclones to victory with 343 passing yards and three touchdowns.

Oklahoma took an early 17–3 lead early in the second quarter before taking a 24–13 lead into halftime. In the second half, Iowa State opened with two scoring drives while Oklahoma lost a fumble and missed a 44-yard field goal, bringing the score to 31–24 Iowa State with 12:46 remaining in the fourth quarter. Baker Mayfield led a 75-yard drive capped by a one-yard touchdown run by Dimitri Flowers to tie the game 31–31. Iowa State then had their own 75-yard drive, ending in what would be the decisive 25-yard touchdown pass from Kyle Kempt to Allen Lazard with 2:19 remaining. Oklahoma failed to convert on fourth down with 1:27 remaining, and Iowa State ran out the clock to complete the victory.

=== vs. Texas ===
Red River Rivalry: No. 12 Oklahoma Sooners (4–1) vs. Texas Longhorns (3–2)

Quarter	1	2	3	4	Total
No. 12 Oklahoma	10	10	3	6	29
Texas	0	10	7	7	24

at Cotton Bowl • Dallas, Texas

- Date: October 14
- Game time: 2:36 p.m. CDT
- Game weather: Sunny • 90 °F (32 °C) • Wind SW 10 miles per hour (16 km/h; 8.7 kn) to 15 miles per hour (24 km/h; 13 kn)
- Game attendance: 93,552
- Referee: Cooper Castleberry
- TV announcers (ESPN): Joe Tessitore, Todd Blackledge & Holly Rowe

Game information

Oklahoma

- Baker Mayfield
  17/27, 302 Yds, 2 TD, INT
- Trey Sermon
  20 Rush, 96 Yds
- Mark Andrews
  4 Rec, 104 Yds, TD

Texas

- Sam Ehlinger
  19/39, 278 Yds, TD
  22 Rush, 106 Yds, TD
- Chris Warren III
  4 Rec, 55 Yds

Following the loss to Iowa State, No. 12 Oklahoma traveled to Dallas, Texas to face Texas in the annual Red River Rivalry game. Oklahoma won the game 29–24. The Sooners jumped out to an early 20–0 lead by the mid-second quarter, but Texas scored on a 16-yard pass from Sam Ehlinger to Kyle Porter and then, off a Baker Mayfield interception, kicked a 34-yard field goal as time expired in the second quarter to bring the score to 20–10 entering the half. After an Oklahoma field goal and Texas touchdown brought the score to 23–17 Oklahoma, Texas took the lead with 8:01 remaining in the fourth quarter with an eight-yard touchdown run from quarterback Sam Ehlinger. Oklahoma responded with a three-play, 78-yard drive that ended in a 59-yard touchdown pass from Baker Mayfield to Mark Andrews with 6:53 to go in the game. The Sooner defense held Texas scoreless the rest of the game to secure the 29–24 victory. Baker Mayfield was 17 for 27 in passing attempts, finishing with 302 yards, two touchdowns and one interception.

Scoring summary

Quarter	Time	Drive			Team	Scoring information	Score	
Quarter	Time	Plays	Yards	TOP	Team	Scoring information	OKLA	TEX
1	12:13	5	85	1:48	Oklahoma	Jeff Badet 54-yard touchdown reception from Baker Mayfield, Austin Seibert kick good	7	0
1	3:49	12	62	6:42	Oklahoma	25-yard field goal by Austin Seibert	10	0
2	13:11	9	80	4:17	Oklahoma	Rodney Anderson 15-yard touchdown run, Austin Seibert kick good	17	0
2	4:32	5	47	1:08	Oklahoma	28-yard field goal by Austin Seibert	20	0
2	3:14	4	42	1:08	Texas	Kyle Porter 16-yard touchdown reception from Sam Ehlinger, Joshua Rowland kick good	20	7
2	0:00	9	52	0:59	Texas	34-yard field goal by Joshua Rowland	20	10
3	9:10	12	56	5:50	Oklahoma	36-yard field goal by Austin Seibert	23	10
3	4:27	13	75	4:43	Texas	Chris Warren III 1-yard touchdown run, Joshua Rowland kick good	23	17
4	8:01	8	73	2:24	Texas	Sam Ehlinger 8-yard touchdown run, Joshua Rowland kick good	23	24
4	6:53	3	78	1:00	Oklahoma	Mark Andrews 59-yard touchdown reception from Baker Mayfield, 2-point pass failed	29	24
"TOP" = time of possession. For other American football terms, see Glossary of American football.							29	24

=== at Kansas State ===
No. 9 Oklahoma at Kansas State – Game summary

Quarter	1	2	3	4	Total
No. 9 Oklahoma	7	3	10	22	42
Kansas State	14	7	0	14	35

at Bill Snyder Family Stadium • Manhattan, KS

- Date: October 21, 2017
- Game time: 2:36 p.m. CDT
- Game weather: Temperature: 71 °F (22 °C) • Wind: SW 6-22 MPH • Weather: Cloudy
- Game attendance: 52,122
- Referee: Dan Romeo
- TV announcers (FOX): Gus Johnson, Joel Klatt, Jenny Taft

Following the victory over Texas, No. 9 Oklahoma traveled to Manhattan, Kansas to play conference foe Kansas State. Oklahoma won the game 42–35. After a touchdown pass from Kansas State's Alex Delton to Isaiah Zuber with 2:25 remaining in the fourth quarter, the game was tied 35–35. Baker Mayfield led a drive down to the Kansas State 22-yard line with 24 seconds remaining, and then running back Rodney Anderson scored the game-winning 22-yard touchdown run with 7 seconds remaining. Anderson had 147 rushing yards and one touchdown, while Mayfield threw for 410 yards, two touchdowns, and one interception.

=== Texas Tech ===
Texas Tech at No. 10 Oklahoma – Game summary

Quarter	1	2	3	4	Total
Texas Tech	20	0	7	0	27
No. 10 Oklahoma	14	14	21	0	49

at Gaylord Family Oklahoma Memorial Stadium • Norman, OK

- Date: October 28, 2017
- Game time: 7:12 p.m. CDT
- Game weather: Temperature: 49 °F (9 °C) • Wind: SW 6 MPH • Weather: Clear
- Game attendance: 86,309
- Referee: Brad Van Vark
- TV announcers (ABC/ESPN2): Steve Levy, Brian Griese, Todd McShay

Following the win over Kansas State, Oklahoma played their homecoming game against Texas Tech. Oklahoma won the game 49–27. Both teams scored touchdowns on each of their first three drives, resulting in a 21–20 Oklahoma lead in the second quarter. The Sooners dominated the rest of the game, however, with the Red Raiders failing to score after their first drive in the second half. Oklahoma wide receiver CeeDee Lamb set school freshman records with nine receptions for 147 yards. Quarterback Baker Mayfield threw for 281 yards, four passing touchdowns and another touchdown on the ground.

=== at Oklahoma State ===
No. 8 Oklahoma at No. 11 Oklahoma State (Bedlam Series) – Game summary

Quarter	1	2	3	4	Total
No. 8 Oklahoma	14	24	10	14	62
No. 11 Oklahoma State	10	28	0	14	52

at Boone Pickens Stadium • Stillwater, OK

- Date: November 4, 2017
- Game time: 3:11 p.m. CDT
- Game weather: Temperature: 68 °F (20 °C) • Wind: WNW 2 MPH • Weather: Partly Cloudy
- Game attendance: 56,790
- Referee: Mike Defee
- TV announcers (FS1): Gus Johnson, Joel Klatt, Jenny Taft

Game information

First quarter

- OKST - Matt Ammendola 29 yd field goal, 12:07.

Cowboys 3-0. Drive: 6 plays, 17 yards, 1:47.

- OKLA - Dimitri Flowers 49 yd pass from Baker Mayfield (Austin Seibert kick), 9:03.

Sooners 7-3. Driver: 4 plays, 71 yards, 1:14.

- OKST - Marcell Ateman 1 yd pass from Mason Rudolph (Matt Ammendola kick), 7:01.

Cowboys 10-7. Drive: 6 plays, 75 yards, 2:02.

- OKLA - Jeff Badet 5 yd pass from Baker Mayfield (Austin Seibert kick), 4:45.

Sooners 14-10. Drive: 6 plays, 80 yards, 2:16.

Second quarter

- OKLA - Baker Mayfield 7 yd run (Austin Seibert kick), 14:53.

Sooners 21-10. Drive: 9 plays, 79 yards, 3:37.

- OKST - Justice Hill 6 yd run (Matt Ammendola kick), 14:07.

Sooners 21-17. Drive: 4 plays, 75 yards, 0:46.

- OKLA - Marquise Brown 84 yd pass from Baker Mayfield (Austin Seibert kick), 13:50.

Sooners 28-17. Drive: 1 play, 84 yards, 0:17.

- OKST - Marcell Ateman 2 yd pass from Mason Rudolph (Matt Ammendola kick), 11:09.

Sooners 28-24. Drive: 10 plays, 75 yards, 2:41.

- OKLA - Rodney Anderson 14 yd run (Austin Seibert kick), 8:12.

Sooners 35-24. Drive: 7 plays, 75 yards, 2:57.

- OKST - James Washington 35 yd pass from Mason Rudolph (Matt Ammendola kick), 7:16.

Sooners 35-31. Drive: 5 plays, 75 yards, 0:56.

- OKLA - Austin Seibert 20 yd field goal, 1:18.

Sooners 38-31. Drive: 10 plays, 74 yards, 5:58.

- OKST - Justice Hill 30 yd run (Matt Ammendola kick), 0:33.

Tied 38-38. Drive: 5 plays, 75 yards, 0:45.

Third quarter

- OKLA - Austin Seibert 36 yd field goal, 4:47.

Sooners 41-38. Drive: 4 plays, - 9 yards, 2:10.

- OKLA - Rodney Anderson 43 yd pass from Baker Mayfield (Austin Seibert kick), 0:12.

Sooners 48-38. Drive: 3 plays, 80 yards, 1:02.

Fourth quarter

- OKST - Tyron Johnson 33 yd pass from Mason Rudolph (Matt Ammendola kick), 12:30.

Sooners 48-45. Drive: 7 plays, 75 yards, 2:42.

- OKLA - Marquise Brown 77 yd pass from Baker Mayfield (Austin Seibert kick), 11:43.

Sooners 55-45. Drive: 2 plays, 77 yards, 0:47.

- OKST - Tyron Johnson 18 yd pass from Mason Rudolph (Matt Ammendola kick), 9:51.

Sooners 55-52. Drive: 9 plays, 75 yards, 1:52.

- OKLA - Trey Sermon 53 yd run (Austin Seibert kick), 0:42.

Sooners 62-52. Drive: 2 plays, 62 yards, 0:18.

Leading Passers

- OKLA – Baker Mayfield - 24/36, 598 yards, 5 TD, 2 INT
- OKST – Mason Rudolph - 28/54, 448 yards, 5 TD, 2 INT

Leading Rushers

- OKLA – Rodney Anderson - 21 carries, 111 yards, 1 TD
- OKST – Justice Hill - 30 carries, 228 yards, 2 TD

Leading Receivers

- OKLA – Marquise Brown - 9 receptions, 265 yards, 2 TD
- OKST – James Washington - 7 receptions, 128 yards, 1 TD

Following the win over Texas Tech, the Sooners traveled to Stillwater, Oklahoma to play in-state rival Oklahoma State in the Bedlam Series. Oklahoma won the game 62–52. In an offensive shootout, the teams combined for 1,446 yards of total offense. After a rare Baker Mayfield interception on the third play of the game, the two teams traded touchdown drives for much of the first half. The score was 38–38 at the half, and Mayfield had a one-half school-record 387 passing yards. Leading 55–52 late in the fourth quarter, Oklahoma running back Trey Sermon scored the decisive touchdown on a 53-yard run with 54 seconds remaining. Mayfield finished with a career-high and school-record 598 passing yards, five touchdowns, and two interceptions. Wide receiver Marquise Brown caught nine passes for a school-record 265 receiving yards.

=== TCU ===
No. 8 TCU at No. 5 Oklahoma – Game summary

Quarter	1	2	3	4	Total
No. 8 TCU	7	7	0	6	20
No. 5 Oklahoma	17	21	0	0	38

at Gaylord Family Oklahoma Memorial Stadium • Norman, OK

- Date: November 11, 2017
- Game time: 7:10 p.m. CST
- Game weather: Temperature: 58 °F (14 °C) • Wind: SE 11 MPH • Weather: Overcast
- Game attendance: 88,308
- Referee: Reggie Smith
- TV announcers (FOX): Gus Johnson, Joel Klatt, Jenny Taft

Following the win over Oklahoma State, No. 5 Oklahoma returned to Norman for a top-10 match-up against TCU. Oklahoma won the game 38–20 in front of a record 88,308 fans at Gaylord Family Oklahoma Memorial Stadium. Oklahoma jumped out to an early lead due to several touchdown-capped drives by Baker Mayfield. The Sooners led 38–14 at the half. Both teams' offenses struggled to score in the second half, as an early-fourth quarter TCU touchdown was the only score of the half. Sooner running back Rodney Anderson had 290 yards from scrimmage and four touchdowns in the game.

=== at Kansas ===
No. 3 Oklahoma at Kansas – Game summary

Quarter	1	2	3	4	Total
No. 3 Oklahoma	7	14	7	13	41
Kansas	0	3	0	0	3

at David Booth Kansas Memorial Stadium • Lawrence, KS

- Date: November 18, 2017
- Game time: 2:35 p.m. CST
- Game weather: Temperature: 52 °F (11 °C) • Wind: NNW 13 MPH • Weather: Partly cloudy
- Game attendance: 22,854
- Referee: Scott Campbell
- TV announcers (ESPN): Dave Pasch, Greg McElroy, Tom Luginbill

Following the win over TCU, No. 3 Oklahoma traveled to Lawrence, Kansas to play Kansas. The Sooners won in a 41–3 rout. Baker Mayfield led the Sooners with 257 passing yards and three touchdowns. There was major trash-talking during the game, as Mayfield generated controversy when he was caught on camera grabbing his crotch and cursing at the Kansas bench. Mayfield later released an apology for the incident.

=== West Virginia ===
West Virginia at No. 3 Oklahoma – Game summary

Quarter	1	2	3	4	Total
West Virginia	3	7	14	7	31
No. 3 Oklahoma	14	31	14	0	59

at Gaylord Family Oklahoma Memorial Stadium • Norman, OK

- Date: November 25, 2017
- Game time: 2:50 p.m. CST
- Game weather: Temperature: 65 °F (18 °C) • Wind: NNE 15 MPH • Weather: Mostly sunny
- Game attendance: 86,117
- Referee: Brad Van Vark
- TV announcers (ESPN): Steve Levy, Brian Griese, Todd McShay

In their final game of the regular season, No. 3 Oklahoma faced West Virginia at home. The Sooners won the game 59–31. Quarterback Baker Mayfield, as punishment for his taunting act during the previous game against Kansas, did not start the game, his last game of his career in Norman. Mayfield was subbed into the game in the first quarter and the Sooners scored touchdowns on all five drives Mayfield played in before the half. Running back Rodney Anderson ran for 118 yards and four touchdowns in the game.

=== Big 12 Championship Game ===
No. 10 TCU vs. No. 2 Oklahoma (Big 12 Championship Game) – Game summary

Quarter	1	2	3	4	Total
No. 2 Oklahoma	17	7	17	0	41
No. 10 TCU	0	17	0	0	17

at AT&T Stadium • Arlington, TX

- Date: December 2, 2017
- Game time: 11:49 a.m. CST
- Game weather: Temperature: 72 °F (22 °C) • Wind: N/A • Weather: Indoors
- Game attendance: 64,104
- Referee: Mike Defee
- TV announcers (FOX): Joe Davis, Brady Quinn, Bruce Feldman, Petros Papadakis, Mike Pereira

The Big 12 held its first football championship game since 2010 during the 2017 season. The championship game participants were to be the two conference members with the best conference records. Oklahoma earned its place in the game by finishing with a conference-best record of 8–1, and TCU finished in second with a conference record of 7–2. Thus, a rematch was set between the two teams, playing their second top-ten match-up in four weeks.

Oklahoma won the conference championship game and the Big 12 title by a score of 41–17. The Sooners jumped out to a quick 17–0 lead, in part thanks to an 18-yard fumble return for a touchdown by Caleb Kelly. After two touchdown drives led by TCU's Kenny Hill, the score was 24–17 at the half. Oklahoma's first offensive play of the second half was a 55-yard touchdown pass from Baker Mayfield to Mykel Jones, and their next drive concluded on a 52-yard touchdown connection between Mayfield and Marquise Brown. The Sooner defense surrendered zero points in the second half. Mayfield finished with 243 yards and four touchdowns in the win.

=== vs. Georgia (Rose Bowl) ===
No. 3 Georgia vs. No. 2 Oklahoma (Rose Bowl–CFP Semifinal) – Game summary

Quarter	1	2	3	4	OT	2OT	Total
No. 2 Oklahoma	14	17	0	14	3	0	48
No. 3 Georgia	7	10	14	14	3	6	54

at Rose Bowl • Pasadena, CA

- Date: January 1, 2018
- Game time: 2:12 p.m. PST
- Game weather: Temperature: 71 °F (22 °C) • Wind: S 1 MPH • Weather: Sunny
- Game attendance: 92,844
- Referee: Jeff Heaser
- TV announcers (ESPN): Chris Fowler, Kirk Herbstreit, Tom Rinaldi, Maria Taylor

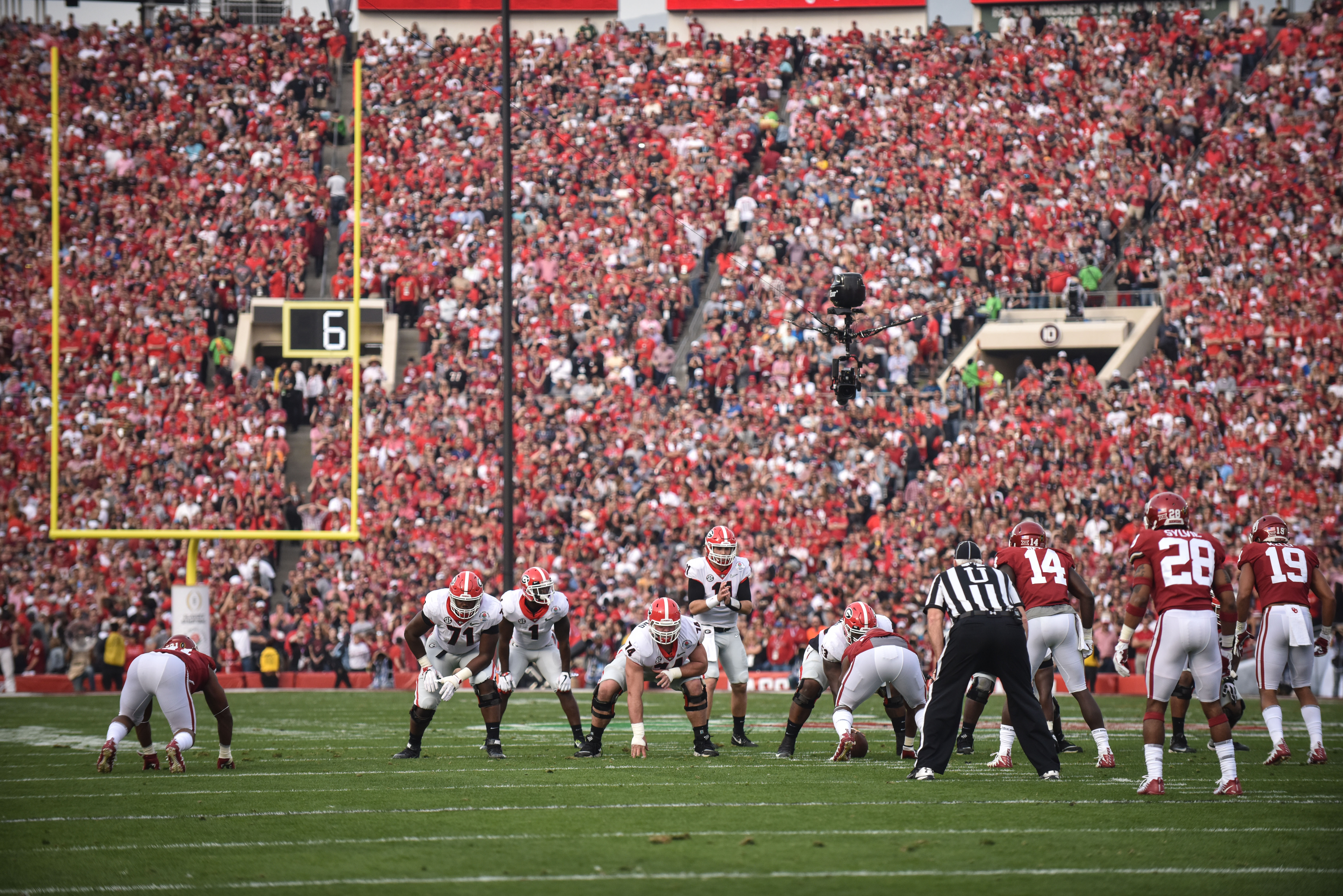
The 2018 Rose Bowl, January 1, 2018

In the final College Football Playoff rankings of the 2017 season, Oklahoma was ranked second, which earned them a spot in the national semifinal game to be played at the 2018 Rose Bowl on New Year's Day. Their opponent was the third-seeded Georgia Bulldogs, champions of the Southeastern Conference. It was the first ever match-up between the two schools. The Rose Bowl winner would go on to play in the 2018 College Football Playoff National Championship.

Oklahoma lost in double overtime, 48–54, in a game many observers described as an "instant classic". It was the highest-ever scoring Rose Bowl game, and the first CFP game to go to overtime. The Sooners were the first to score, with a 13-yard pass from Baker Mayfield to Marquise Brown. Georgia's Sony Michel scored two first-half touchdowns, first on a 13-yard pass from Jake Fromm, then on a 75-yard run in the second quarter. With 13 seconds left in the first half, the Sooners scored on a trick play in which freshman wide receiver CeeDee Lamb threw a two-yard touchdown pass to quarterback Baker Mayfield. Oklahoma had a 31–17 lead at the end of the half. Their lead was chipped away by the Bulldogs early in the second half by two touchdowns by Sony Michel and Nick Chubb. A 46-yard fumble return touchdown by Oklahoma's Steven Parker gave Oklahoma the lead again late, but a two-yard touchdown run by Georgia's Nick Chubb tied the game 45–45 with 55 seconds left in regulation. In the first overtime, Georgia and Oklahoma exchanged field goals. In double overtime, Oklahoma kicker Austin Seibert's 27-yard field goal was blocked, and on the ensuing Georgia possession, running back Sony Michel won the game on a 27-yard touchdown run.

== Rankings ==
Ranking movements Legend: ██ Increase in ranking ██ Decrease in ranking ( ) = First-place votes
	Week															
Poll	Pre	1	2	3	4	5	6	7	8	9	10	11	12	13	14	Final
AP	7	5	2 (2)	3 (1)	3 (1)	3	12	9	10	8	5	3	3	2 (24)	2 (18)	3
Coaches	8	6	3	3	3	3	12	9	9	9	7	5	5	2 (12)	2 (10)	3
CFP	Not released									5	5	4	4	3	2	Not released

== Awards and honors ==
Weekly Awards
Player	Award	Date	Ref.
Baker Mayfield	Big 12 Offensive Player of the Week	September 2, 2017	
Baker Mayfield	Big 12 Offensive Player of the Week	September 9, 2017	
Marquise Brown	Big 12 Newcomer of the Week	September 15, 2017	
Trey Sermon	Big 12 Newcomer of the Week	September 22, 2017	
Ogbonnia Okoronkwo	Big 12 Defensive Player of the Week	October 14, 2017	
Baker Mayfield	Big 12 Offensive Player of the Week	October 21, 2017	
Rodney Anderson	Big 12 Co-offensive Player of the Week	October 28, 2017	
CeeDee Lamb	Big 12 Newcomer of the Week	October 28, 2017	
Baker Mayfield	Big 12 Offensive Player of the Week; Walter Camp FBS Player of the Week	November 4, 2017	
Austin Seibert	Big 12 Special Teams Player of the Week	November 4, 2017	
CeeDee Lamb	Big 12 Newcomer of the Week	November 4, 2017	
Rodney Anderson	Big 12 Offensive Player of the Week	November 11, 2017	

Individual Awards
Player	Award
Baker Mayfield	Heisman Trophy; AP Player of the Year; Chic Harley Award; Maxwell Award; SN Player of the Year; Walter Camp Award; Davey O'Brien Award; Manning Award; Big 12 Offensive Player of the Year
Mark Andrews	John Mackey Award
Connor McGinnis	Peter Mortell Award
Ogbonnia Okoronkwo	Big 12 Co-defensive Player of the Year
Orlando Brown Jr.	Big 12 Offensive Lineman of the Year

All-American
Player	AP	AFCA	FWAA	TSN	WCFF	Designation
Baker Mayfield	1	1	1	1	1	Unanimous
Mark Andrews	1	1	1	1	1	Unanimous
Orlando Brown Jr.	1	1	1	1	1	Unanimous
Ogbonnia Okoronkwo	2		2	2	1	None
The NCAA recognizes a selection to all five of the AP, AFCA, FWAA, TSN and WCFF first teams for unanimous selections and three of five for consensus selections.

All-Big 12
Player	Selection
Baker Mayfield	First Team (Offense)
Dimitri Flowers	First Team (Offense)
Mark Andrews	First Team (Offense)
Orlando Brown Jr.	First Team (Offense)
Erick Wren	First Team (Offense)
Ogbonnia Okoronkwo	First Team (Defense)
Rodney Anderson	Second Team (Offense)
Ben Powers	Second Team (Offense)
Dru Samia	Second Team (Offense)
Austin Seibert	Second Team (Offense)
D.J. Ward	Second Team (Defense)
Steven Parker	Second Team (Defense)
Emmanuel Beal	Honorable Mention (Defense)
Marquise Brown	Honorable Mention (Offense)
Grant Calcaterra	Honorable Mention (Offense)
Bobby Evans	Honorable Mention (Offense)
Will Johnson	Honorable Mention (Defense)
Caleb Kelly	Honorable Mention (Defense)
Kenneth Murray	Honorable Mention (Defense)
Austin Selbert	Honorable Mention (Defense)

== 2018 NFL draft ==
The 2018 NFL draft was held on April 26–28 in Arlington, Texas. Four Oklahoma players were selected as part of the draft, and five were signed to NFL teams as undrafted free agents. Baker Mayfield became the fourth Oklahoma player to be selected with the first overall pick, and the first since Sam Bradford in 2010.

Player	Position	Round	Overall Pick	NFL team
Baker Mayfield	QB	1	1	Cleveland Browns
Orlando Brown Jr.	OT	3	83	Baltimore Ravens
Mark Andrews	TE	3	86	Baltimore Ravens
Ogbonnia Okoronkwo	LB	5	160	Los Angeles Rams
Dimitri Flowers	RB	Undrafted		New York Jets
Jordan Thomas	CB	Undrafted		Philadelphia Eagles
Jeff Badet	WR	Undrafted		Minnesota Vikings
Steven Parker	DB	Undrafted		Los Angeles Rams
Emmanuel Beal	LB	Undrafted		Seattle Seahawks
