= 2017 Big 12 Conference football season =

American college football season

- League: NCAA Division I Football Bowl Subdivision
- Sport: Football
- Duration: September 2, 2017 through December 2, 2017
- Teams: 10
- TV partner(s): ABC, FOX, ESPN, FS1, FSN, LHN

2018 NFL Draft
- Top draft pick: Baker Mayfield (Oklahoma)
- Picked by: Cleveland Browns, 1st overall

Regular season
- Season champions: Oklahoma Sooners

Football seasons
- 2016 2018

2017 Big 12 Conference football standings
	Conf.			Overall
Team	W		L	W		L
No. 3 Oklahoma y$^	8	–	1	12	–	2
No. 9 TCU y	7	–	2	11	–	3
No. 14 Oklahoma State	6	–	3	10	–	3
Texas	5	–	4	7	–	6
West Virginia	5	–	4	7	–	6
Kansas State	5	–	4	8	–	5
Iowa State	5	–	4	8	–	5
Texas Tech	3	–	6	6	–	7
Baylor	1	–	8	1	–	11
Kansas	0	–	9	1	–	11
Championship: Oklahoma 41, TCU 17
^ – College Football Playoff participant; $ – Conference champion; y – Championship game participant; Rankings from AP Poll

The 2017 Big 12 Conference football season was the 22nd season of Big 12 Conference football, taking place during the 2017 NCAA Division I FBS football season. The season began with non-conference play on September 2, 2017, when all 10 of the league's teams played their first non-conference opponents. Big 12 Conference play began on September 23, 2017.

The 2017 season was the sixth for the Big 12 since the 2010–13 Big 12 Conference realignment brought the Big 12 membership to its current form. The conference had ten members: Baylor, Iowa State, Kansas, Kansas State, Oklahoma, Oklahoma State, TCU, Texas, Texas Tech and West Virginia. The Big 12 was a Power Five conference under the College Football Playoff format, along with the ACC, the Big Ten, the Pac-12 and the SEC.

As a ten-team league, the Big 12 played a nine-game, round-robin conference schedule. Each member played three non-conference games–one of which was required to be against another Power Five conference foe. The regular season was followed by a conference championship game played between the regular season champion and regular season runner-up. The 2017 Big 12 Championship Game was held Saturday, December 2, 2017, at AT&T Stadium in Arlington, Texas.

== Preseason ==
=== Recruiting ===
National rankings
Team	ESPN	Rivals	Scout	24/7	Total signees
Baylor	#17*	#55	#47	#36	15
Iowa State	#54	#53	#45	#52	29
Kansas	NR	#100	#94	#81	19
Kansas State	#70	#76	#73	#71	21
Oklahoma	#21	#16	#19	#22	22
Oklahoma State	#46	#48	#42	#43	21
TCU	#23	#20	#13	#18	24
Texas	#10	#7	#3	#9	28
Texas Tech	#42	#46	#31	#47	25
West Virginia	#37	#38	#36	#41	28

=== Preseason poll ===
The 2017 Big12 Preseason media poll was announced on July 13, 2017 prior to the Big12 media days. The Big12 media days were held from July 17–18 in Frisco, Texas. Oklahoma was selected as preseason champions for the fifth time since 2011.

1. Oklahoma – 303 (19)
2. Oklahoma State – 294 (12)
3. Kansas State – 231 (1)
4. Texas – 213
5. TCU – 202
6. West Virginia – 183
7. Baylor – 129
8. Texas Tech – 85
9. Iowa State – 83
10. Kansas – 37
- First place votes in ()

=== Preseason awards ===
2017 Preseason All-Big 12

- Offensive Player of the Year: Baker Mayfield, Oklahoma, QB
- Defensive Player of the Year: Dorance Armstrong Jr., Kansas, LB
- Newcomer of the Year: Will Grier, West Virginia, QB

All-Big 12 Offense
Position	Player	Class	Team
QB	Baker Mayfield	Senior	Oklahoma
RB	Justice Hill	Sophomore	Oklahoma State
RB	Justin Crawford	Senior	West Virginia
FB	Winston Dimel	Junior	Kansas State
WR	Keke Coutee	Junior	Texas Tech
WR	Allen Lazard	Senior	Iowa State
WR	James Washington	Senior	Oklahoma State
TE	Mark Andrews	Junior	Oklahoma
OL	Dalton Risner	Junior	Kansas State
OL	Austin Schlottmann	Senior	TCU
OL	Orlando Brown	Junior	Oklahoma
OL	Zach Crabtree	Senior	Oklahoma State
OL	Connor Williams	Junior	Texas
PK	Clayton Hatfield	Junior	Texas Tech
KR/PR	KaVontae Turpin	Junior	TCU

All-Big 12 Defense
Position	Player	Class	Team
DL	Dorance Armstrong Jr.	Junior	Kansas
DL	K.J. Smith	Senior	Baylor
DL	Reggie Walker	Sophomore	Kansas State
DL	Poona Ford	Senior	Texas
DL	Malcolm Roach	Sophomore	Texas
LB	Travin Howard	Senior	TCU
LB	Ogbonnia Okoronkwo	Senior	Oklahoma
LB	Malik Jefferson	Junior	Texas
DB	D. J. Reed	Junior	Kansas State
DB	Tre Flowers	Senior	Oklahoma State
DB	Jordan Thomas	Senior	Oklahoma
DB	Kamari Cotton-Moya	Senior	Iowa State
DB	Nick Orr	Senior	TCU
P	Michael Dickerson	Junior	Texas

== Schedule ==
=== Regular season ===
==== Week 1 ====
Schedule and results:

Date	Time (CT)	Visiting team	Home team	Site	TV	Result	Attendance
August 31	6:30 p.m.	Tulsa	#10 Oklahoma State	Boone Pickens Stadium • Stillwater, OK	FS1	W 59–24	56,790
September 2	11:00 a.m.	Maryland	#23 Texas	Darrell K Royal–Texas Memorial Stadium • Austin, TX	FS1	L 41–51	88,396
September 2	2:30 p.m.	UTEP	#7 Oklahoma	Gaylord Family Oklahoma Memorial Stadium • Norman, OK	FOX	W 59–7	86,076
September 2	3:00 p.m.	Eastern Washington	Texas Tech	Jones AT&T Stadium • Lubbock, TX	FSN	W 56–10	54,988
September 2	6:00 p.m.	Southeast Missouri State	Kansas	Memorial Stadium • Lawrence, KS	JTV	W 38–16	32,134
September 2	6:00 p.m.	Central Arkansas	#20 Kansas State	Bill Snyder Family Stadium • Manhattan, KS	K-StateHD.tv	W 55–19	51,043
September 2	6:00 p.m.	Liberty	Baylor	McLane Stadium • Waco, TX	FS2	L 45–48	45,784
September 2	7:00 p.m.	Jackson State	TCU	Amon G. Carter Stadium • Fort Worth, TX	FSN	W 63–0	42,709
September 2	7:00 p.m.	Northern Iowa	Iowa State	Jack Trice Stadium • Ames, IA	Cyclones.TV	W 42–24	61,500
September 3	6:30 p.m.	#22 West Virginia	#21 Virginia Tech	FedExField • Landover, MD	ABC	L 24–31	67,489

==== Week 2 ====
Schedule and results:

Date	Time (CT)	Visiting team	Home team	Site	TV	Result	Attendance
September 8	7:00 p.m.	#11 Oklahoma State	South Alabama	Ladd-Peebles Stadium • Mobile, AL	ESPN2	W 44–7	26,487
September 9	11:00 a.m.	Iowa	Iowa State	Jack Trice Stadium • Ames, IA	ESPN2	L 41–44 (OT)	61,500
September 9	11:00 a.m.	Charlotte	#19 Kansas State	Bill Snyder Family Stadium • Manhattan, KS	FSN	W 55–7	50,087
September 9	11:00 a.m.	East Carolina	West Virginia	Mountaineer Field • Morgantown, WV	FS2	W 56–20	56,797
September 9	2:30 p.m.	#23 TCU	Arkansas	Donald W. Reynolds Razorback Stadium • Fayetteville, AR	CBS	W 28–7	73,668
September 9	2:30 p.m.	San Jose State	Texas	Darrell K Royal–Texas Memorial Stadium • Austin, TX	LHN	W 56–0	88,117
September 9	3:00 p.m.	Central Michigan	Kansas	Memorial Stadium • Lawrence, KS	FSN	L 27–45	28,531
September 9	6:30 p.m.	#5 Oklahoma	#2 Ohio State	Ohio Stadium • Columbus, OH	ABC	W 31–16	109,088
September 9	7:00 p.m.	UTSA	Baylor	McLane Stadium • Waco, TX	FSN	L 10–17	41,923

==== Week 3 ====
Schedule and results:

Date	Time (CT)	Visiting team	Home team	Site	TV	Result	Attendance
September 16	11:00 a.m.	#9 Oklahoma State	Pittsburgh	Heinz Field • Pittsburgh, PA	ESPN	W 59–21	38,952
September 16	11:00 a.m.	Iowa State	Akron	InfoCision Stadium • Akron, OH	CBSSN	W 41–14	22,811
September 16	11:00 a.m.	Delaware State	West Virginia	Mountaineer Field • Morgantown, WV	AT&T SportsNet	W 59–16	51,482
September 16	11:30 a.m.	Baylor	Duke	Wallace Wade Stadium • Durham, NC	ACCN or RSN	L 20–34	26,714
September 16	1:00 p.m.	Kansas	Ohio	Peden Stadium • Athens, OH	ESPN3	L 30–42	22,056
September 16	2:30 p.m.	SMU	#20 TCU	Amon G. Carter Stadium • Fort Worth, TX (Rivalry)	ESPNU	W 56–36	44,489
September 16	5:00 p.m.	Tulane	#2 Oklahoma	Gaylord Family Oklahoma Memorial Stadium • Norman, OK	FSN	W 56–14	86,290
September 16	6:30 p.m.	#18 Kansas State	Vanderbilt	Vanderbilt Stadium • Nashville, TN	ESPNU	L 7–14	40,350
September 16	7:00 p.m.	Arizona State	Texas Tech	Jones AT&T Stadium • Lubbock, TX	FSN	W 52–45	58,547
September 16	7:30 p.m.	Texas	#4 USC	Los Angeles Memorial Coliseum • Los Angeles, CA	FOX	L 24–27 (2OT)	93,607

==== Week 4 ====
Schedule and results:

Date	Time (CT)	Visiting team	Home team	Site	TV	Result	Attendance
September 23	11:00 a.m.	Texas Tech	Houston	TDECU Stadium • Houston, TX	ABC/ESPN2	W 27–24	36,383
September 23	11:00 a.m.	West Virginia	Kansas	Memorial Stadium • Lawrence, KS	ESPNU	WVU 56–34	23,901
September 23	2:30 p.m.	#16 TCU	#6 Oklahoma State	Boone Pickens Stadium • Stillwater, OK	ESPN	TCU 44–31	56,790
September 23	5:30 p.m.	#3 Oklahoma	Baylor	McLane Stadium • Waco, TX	FS1	OU 49–41	43,573

==== Week 5 ====
Schedule and results:

Date	Time (CT)	Visiting team	Home team	Site	TV	Result	Attendance
September 28	7:00 p.m.	Texas	Iowa State	Jack Trice Stadium • Ames, IA	ESPN	UT 17–7	51,234
September 30	2:30 p.m.	Baylor	Kansas State	Bill Snyder Family Stadium • Manhattan, KS	ESPN2	KSU 33–20	52,293
September 30	7:00 p.m.	#15 Oklahoma State	Texas Tech	Jones AT&T Stadium • Lubbock, TX	FOX	OSU 41–34	60,901

==== Week 6 ====
Schedule and results:

Date	Time (CT)	Visiting team	Home team	Site	TV	Result	Attendance
October 7	11:00 a.m.	Texas Tech	Kansas	Memorial Stadium • Lawrence, KS	FS1	TTU 65–19	21,050
October 7	11:00 a.m.	Iowa State	#3 Oklahoma	Gaylord Family Oklahoma Memorial Stadium • Norman, OK	FOX	ISU 38–31	86,019
October 7	2:30 p.m.	#23 West Virginia	#8 TCU	Amon G. Carter Stadium • Fort Worth, TX	FS1	TCU 31–24	43,257
October 7	6:00 p.m.	Kansas State	Texas	Darrell K Royal–Texas Memorial Stadium • Austin TX	FS1	UT 40–34 (2OT)	90,462

==== Week 7 ====
Schedule and results:

Date	Time (CT)	Visiting team	Home team	Site	TV	Result	Attendance
October 14	11:00 am	#6 TCU	Kansas State	Bill Snyder Family Stadium • Manhattan, KS	FS1	TCU 26–6	52,055
October 14	11:00 am	#24 Texas Tech	West Virginia	Mountaineer Field • Morgantown, WV	ESPNU	WVU 46–35	60,928
October 14	2:30 pm	#12 Oklahoma	Texas	Cotton Bowl • Dallas, TX (Red River Showdown)	ESPN	OU 29–24	93,552
October 14	2:30 pm	Baylor	#14 Oklahoma State	Boone Pickens Stadium • Stillwater, OK	FS1	OSU 59–16	56,790
October 14	11:00 am	Kansas	Iowa State	Jack Trice Stadium • Ames, IA	FSN	ISU 45–0	55,593

==== Week 8 ====
Schedule and results:

Date	Time (CT)	Visiting team	Home team	Site	TV	Result	Attendance
October 21	11:00 am	Iowa State	Texas Tech	Jones AT&T Stadium • Lubbock, TX	FS1	ISU 31–13	57,045
October 21	11:00 am	#9 Oklahoma State	Texas	Darrell K Royal–Texas Memorial Stadium • Austin, TX	ABC	OSU 13–10 (OT)	92,506
October 21	3:00 pm	#10 Oklahoma	Kansas State	Bill Snyder Family Stadium • Lubbock, TX	FOX	OU 42–35	52,122
October 21	7:00 pm	Kansas	#4 TCU	Amon G. Carter Stadium • Fort Worth, TX	FOX	TCU 43–0	42,969
October 21	7:00 pm	#23 West Virginia	Baylor	McLane Stadium • Waco, TX	FS2	WVU 38–36	45, 389

==== Week 9 ====
Schedule and results:

Date	Time (CT)	Visiting team	Home team	Site	TV	Result	Attendance
October 28	11:00 am	#11 Oklahoma State	#22 West Virginia	Mountaineer Field • Morgantown, WV	ABC	OSU 50–39	57,507
October 28	11:00 am	Texas	Baylor	McLane Stadium • Waco, TX	ESPNU	UT 38–7	45,656
October 28	2:00 pm	Kansas State	Kansas	Memorial Stadium • Lawrence, KS (Rivalry)	FS1	KSU 30–20	36,223
October 28	2:30 pm	#4 TCU	#25 Iowa State	Jack Trice Stadium • Ames, IA	ABC/ESPN2	ISU 14–7	56,259
October 28	7:00 pm	Texas Tech	#10 Oklahoma	Gaylord Family Oklahoma Memorial Stadium • Norman, OK	ESPN2	OU 49–27	86,309

==== Week 10 ====
Schedule and results:

Date	Time (CT)	Visiting team	Home team	Site	TV	Result	Attendance
November 4	11:00 a.m.	Baylor	Kansas	Memorial Stadium • Lawrence, KS	FSN	BU 38–9	21,797
November 4	11:00 a.m.	Kansas State	Texas Tech	Jones AT&T Stadium • Lubbock, TX	FS1	KSU 42–35 (OT)	47,631
November 4	3:00 p.m.	#8 Oklahoma	#11 Oklahoma State	Boone Pickens Stadium • Stillwater, OK (Bedlam Series)	FS1	OU 62–52	56,790
November 4	3:30 p.m.	#14 Iowa State	West Virginia	Mountaineer Field • Morgantown, WV	ESPN2/ESPNU	WVU 20–16	55,831
November 4	6:15 p.m.	Texas	#10 TCU	Amon G. Carter Stadium • Fort Worth, TX	ESPN	TCU 24–7	48,042

==== Week 11 ====
Schedule and results:

Date	Time (CT)	Visiting team	Home team	Site	TV	Result	Attendance
November 11	11:00 a.m.	#15 Oklahoma State	#21 Iowa State	Jack Trice Stadium • Ames, IA	ABC/ESPN2	OSU 49–42	61,500
November 11	11:00 a.m.	Texas Tech	Baylor	AT&T Stadium • Arlington, TX (Rivalry)	FSN	TTU 38–24	34,482
November 11	2:30 p.m.	West Virginia	Kansas State	Bill Snyder Family Football Stadium • Manhattan, KS	ESPN2	WVU 28–23	51,223
November 11	5:00 p.m.	Kansas	Texas	Darrell K Royal–Texas Memorial Stadium • Austin, TX	JTV/LHN	UT 42–27	96,557
November 11	7:00 p.m.	#6 TCU	#5 Oklahoma	Gaylord Family Oklahoma Memorial Stadium • Norman, OK	FOX	OU 38–20	88,308

==== Week 12 ====
Schedule and results:

Date	Time (CT)	Visiting team	Home team	Site	TV	Result	Attendance
November 18	11:00 a.m.	Texas	West Virginia	Mountaineer Field • Morgantown, WV	ESPN	UT 28–14	53,133
November 18	11:00 a.m.	#12 TCU	Texas Tech	Jones AT&T Stadium • Lubbock, TX (Rivalry)	FS1	TCU 27–3	51,278
November 18	1:30 p.m.	Iowa State	Baylor	McLane Stadium • Waco, TX	FSN	ISU 23–13	40,653
November 18	2:30 p.m.	Kansas State	#13 Oklahoma State	Boone Pickens Stadium • Stillwater, OK	ESPN2	KSU 45–40	56,790
November 18	2:30 p.m.	#4 Oklahoma	Kansas	Memorial Stadium • Lawrence, KS	ESPN	OU 41–3	22,854

==== Week 13 ====
Schedule and results:

Date	Time (CT)	Visiting team	Home team	Site	TV	Result	Attendance
November 24	11:00 a.m.	Baylor	#12 TCU	Amon G. Carter Stadium • Fort Worth, TX (Revivalry)	FS1	TCU 45–22	43,015
November 24	7:00 p.m.	Texas Tech	Texas	Darrell K Royal–Texas Memorial Stadium • Austin, TX	FOX	TTU 27–23	100,629
November 25	2:30 p.m.	Iowa State	Kansas State	Bill Snyder Family Stadium • Manhattan, KS (Farmageddon)	ESPN2	KSU 20–19	49,554
November 25	11:00 a.m.	Kansas	#19 Oklahoma State	Boone Pickens Stadium • Stillwater, OK	FS1	OSU 58–17	56,790
November 25	2:45 p.m.	West Virginia	#4 Oklahoma	Gaylord Family Oklahoma Memorial Stadium • Norman, OK	ESPN	OU 59–31	86,117

=== Championship game ===
==== Week 14 (Big 12 Championship Game) ====
Schedule and results:

Date	Time (CT)	Visiting team	Home team	Site	TV	Result	Attendance
December 2	11:30 a.m.	#3 Oklahoma	#11 TCU	AT&T Stadium • Arlington, TX	FOX	OU 41–17	64,104

== Big 12 vs other conferences ==
=== Big 12 vs Power 5 matchups ===
This is a list of the power conference teams (ACC, Big Ten, Pac-12 and SEC along with independents Notre Dame and BYU) the Big 12 plays in the non-conference (Rankings from the AP Poll):

Date	Visitor	Home	Site	Significance	Score
September 2	Maryland	#23 Texas	Darrell K Royal–Texas Memorial Stadium • Austin, TX		L, 41–51
September 3	#22 West Virginia	#21 Virginia Tech	FedEx Field • Landover, MD	Virginia Tech–West Virginia football rivalry	L, 24–31
September 9	Iowa	Iowa State	Jack Trice Stadium • Ames, IA	Iowa–Iowa State football rivalry	L 41–44 (OT)
September 9	#5 Oklahoma	#2 Ohio State	Ohio Stadium • Columbus, OH		W 31–16
September 9	#23 TCU	Arkansas	Donald W. Reynolds Razorback Stadium • Fayetteville, AR		W 28–7
September 16	#9 Oklahoma State	Pittsburgh	Heinz Field • Pittsburgh, PA		W 59–21
September 16	Baylor	Duke	Wallace Wade Stadium • Durham, NC		L 34–20
September 16	#18 Kansas State	Vanderbilt	Vanderbilt Stadium • Nashville, TN		L 14–7
September 16	Arizona State	Texas Tech	Jones AT&T Stadium • Lubbock, TX		W 52–45
September 16	Texas	#4 USC	Los Angeles Memorial Coliseum • Los Angeles, CA		L 27–24 (2OT)
December 26	Utah	West Virginia	Cotton Bowl • Dallas, TX	Zaxby's Heart of Dallas Bowl	L 30–14
December 26	Kansas State	UCLA	Chase Field • Phoenix, AZ	Motel 6 Cactus Bowl	W 35–17
December 27	Missouri	Texas	NRG Stadium • Houston, TX	Texas Bowl	W 33–16
December 28	#15 Stanford	#13 TCU	Alamodome • San Antonio, TX	Valero Alamo Bowl	W 39–37
December 28	#19 Oklahoma State	#22 Virginia Tech	Camping World Stadium • Orlando, FL	Camping World Bowl	W 30–21
January 1	#3 Georgia	#2 Oklahoma	Rose Bowl • Pasadena, CA	Rose Bowl	L 54–48 (2OT)

=== Records against other conferences ===
Regular Season

Power 5 Conferences	Record
ACC	1–2
Big Ten	1–2
BYU/Notre Dame	0–0
Pac-12	1–1
SEC	1–1
Power 5 Total	4–6
Other FBS Conferences	Record
American	6–0
C-USA	2–1
Independents (Excluding BYU and Notre Dame)	0–0
MAC	1–1
Mountain West	1–0
Sun Belt	1–0
Other FBS Total	11–2
FCS Opponents	Record
Football Championship Subdivision	6–1
Total Non-Conference Record	21–9

Post Season

Power Conferences 5	Record
ACC	1–0
Pac-12	2–1
SEC	1–1
Power 5 Total	4–2
Other FBS Conferences	Record
American	1–1
Other FBS Total	1–1
Total Bowl Record	5–3

== Rankings ==
Legend
	Increase in ranking
	Decrease in ranking
RV	Received votes but were not ranked in Top 25 of poll
NR	Not ranked and did not receive any votes in poll

		Pre	Wk 1	Wk 2	Wk 3	Wk 4	Wk 5	Wk 6	Wk 7	Wk 8	Wk 9	Wk 10	Wk 11	Wk 12	Wk 13	Wk 14	Final
Baylor	AP																
Baylor	C																
Baylor	CFP	Not released															
Iowa State	AP							RV	RV	25	14	24	RV	RV	RV		
Iowa State	C							RV	RV	RV	16	23	RV	RV	NR		
Iowa State	CFP	Not released									15	21					
Kansas	AP																
Kansas	C																
Kansas	CFP	Not released															
Kansas State	AP	20	19	18	RV	RV	RV	NR									
Kansas State	C	19	19	18	RV	RV	RV	NR									
Kansas State	CFP	Not released															
Oklahoma	AP	7	5	2 (2)	3	3	3	12	9	10	8	5	3	3	2		
Oklahoma	C	8	6	3	3	3	3	12	9	9	9	7	5	5	2		
Oklahoma	CFP	Not released									5	5	4	4	3		
Oklahoma State	AP	10	11	9	6	15	15	14	9	11	11	12	10	18	18		
Oklahoma State	C	11	11	8	7	14	14	14	11	12	10	15	13	21	18		
Oklahoma State	CFP	Not released									11	15	13				
TCU	AP	RV	23	20	16	9	8	6	4	4	10	8	11	10	10		
TCU	C	RV	RV	20	15	11	10	7	4	4	12	9	14	13	12		
TCU	CFP	Not released									8	6	12				
Texas	AP	23	NR														
Texas	C	23	RV	NR													
Texas	CFP	Not released															
Texas Tech	AP		RV	RV	RV	RV	RV	24	RV	NR							
Texas Tech	C					RV	RV	RV	NR								
Texas Tech	CFP	Not released															
West Virginia	AP	22	RV	RV	RV	23	23	RV	23	22	RV	23	24	NR			
West Virginia	C	20	RV	RV	RV	23	23	RV	23	22	RV	RV	25	RV			
West Virginia	CFP	Not released															

== Postseason ==
=== Bowl games ===
Bowl game	Date	Site	Television	Time (CST)	Big 12 team	Opponent	Score	Attendance
Birmingham Bowl	December 23	Legion Field • Birmingham, AL	ESPN	11:00 a.m.	**Texas Tech**	USF	**L** 38–34	28,623
Heart of Dallas Bowl	December 26	Cotton Bowl Stadium • Dallas, TX	ESPN	12:30 p.m.	**West Virginia**	Utah	**L** 30–14	20,507
Cactus Bowl	December 26	Chase Field • Phoenix, AZ	ESPN	8:00 p.m.	**Kansas State**	UCLA	**W** 35–17	32,859
Texas Bowl	December 27	NRG Stadium • Houston, TX	ESPN	8:00 p.m.	**Texas**	Missouri	**W** 33–16	67,820
Camping World Bowl	December 28	Camping World Stadium • Orlando, FL	ESPN	4:15 p.m.	#19 **Oklahoma State**	#22 Virginia Tech	**W** 30–21	39,610
Alamo Bowl	December 28	Alamodome • San Antonio, TX	ESPN	8:00 p.m.	#15 **TCU**	#13 Stanford	**W**39–37	57,653
Liberty Bowl	December 30	Liberty Bowl • Memphis, TN	ABC	11:30 a.m.	**Iowa State**	#20 Memphis	**W** 21–20	57,266
**College Football Playoff**
Rose Bowl (Semifinal)	January 1	Rose Bowl Stadium • Pasadena, CA	ESPN	4:00 p.m.	#2 **Oklahoma**	#3 Georgia	**L** 54–48 (2OT)	92,844

* Rankings based on CFP rankings, Big 12 team is bolded

== Awards and honors ==
=== Player of the week honors ===
Following each week's games, Big 12 conference officials select the players of the week from the conference's teams.

Week	Offensive			Defensive			Special teams			Newcomers		
Week	Player	Position	Team	Player	Position	Team	Player	Position	Team	Player	Position	Team
Week 1 (Sept. 2)	Baker Mayfield	QB	Oklahoma	Joe Dineen Jr.	LB	Kansas	D.J. Reed	DB	Kansas State	Will Grier	QB	West Virginia
Week 2 (Sept. 9)	Baker Mayfield (2)	QB	Oklahoma	Kendall Adams	S	Kansas State	Matt Ammdenola	PK	Oklahoma State	Will Grier (2)	QB	West Virginia
Week 3 (Sept. 15)	Mason Rudolph	QB	Oklahoma State	Deshon Elliot	S	Texas	Ja'Deion High	WR	Texas Tech	Marquise Brown	WR	Oklahoma
Week 4 (Sept. 22)	Darius Anderson	WR	TCU	Dakota Allen	LB	Texas Tech	Connor Martin	PK	Baylor	Trey Sermon	RB	Oklahoma
Week 5 (Sept. 30)	Mason Rudolph (2)	QB	Oklahoma State	Deshon Elliot (2)	S	Texas	Matt McCrane	PK	Kansas State	DeMarcus Fields	DB	Texas Tech
Week 6 (Oct. 7)	Kyle Kempt	QB	Iowa State	Joel Lanning	LB	Iowa State	Adam Nunez	P	TCU	Desmond Nisby	RB	Texas Tech
Week 7 (Oct. 14)	Will Grier	QB	West Virginia	Ogbonnia Okoronkwo	DE/LB	Oklahoma	Trever Ryen	P	Iowa State	Will Grier (3)	QB	West Virginia
Week 8 (Oct. 21)	Baker Mayfield (3)	QB	Oklahoma	Marcel Spears Jr.	LB	Iowa State	Kavonte Turpin	PR	TCU	Will Grier (4)	QB	West Virginia
Week 9 (Oct. 28)	Steven Sims Jr. Rodney Anderson	WR; RB	Kansas; Oklahoma	Marcel Spears (2)	LB	Iowa State	D.J. Reed (2)	DB	Kansas State	CeeDee Lamb	WR	Oklahoma
Week 10 (Nov. 4)	Baker Mayfield (4)	QB	Oklahoma	Duke Shelley	DB	Kansas State	Austin Seibert	PK	Oklahoma	Marquise Brown (2)	WR	Oklahoma
Week 11 (Nov. 11)	Rodney Anderson (2)	RB	Oklahoma	Antwaun Davis	DB	Texas	Keke Coutee	WR/KR	Texas Tech	Will Grier (5)	QB	West Virginia
Week 12 (Nov. 18)	Byron Pringle	WR	Kansas State	Gary Johnson; Brian Peavy	LB; DB	Texas; Iowa State	Garret Owens	PK	Iowa State	Skylar Thompson	QB	Kansas State
Week 13 (Nov. 24)	Keke Coutee	WR	Texas Tech	Mat Bosen	DE	TCU	Austin Seibert (2)	PK	Oklahoma	Skylar Thompson (2)	QB	Kansas State

=== Postseason awards ===
2017 Consensus All-Americans

The following Big 12 players were named to the 2017 College Football All-America Team by the Walter Camp Football Foundation (WCFF), Associated Press (AP), Football Writers Association of America (FWAA), Sporting News (SN), and American Football Coaches Association (AFCA):

Academic All-America Team Member of the Year (CoSIDA)

Consensus All-Americans
Player	Position	Class	Team

==== 2017 All-Big 12 ====
- Offensive Player of the Year: Baker Mayfield, Oklahoma
- Defensive Player of the Year: Ogbo Okoronkwo, Oklahoma
  Malik Jefferson, Texas
- Offensive Freshman of the Year: Charlie Brewer, Baylor
  Jalen Reagor, TCU
- Defensive Freshman of the Year: Ross Blacklock, TCU
  Kenneth Murray, Oklahoma
- Offensive Lineman of the Year: Orlando Brown, Oklahoma
- Defensive Lineman of the Year: Poona Ford, Texas
- Offensive Newcomer of the Year: Will Grier, WVU
- Defensive Newcomer of the Year: Ben Banogu, TCU
- Special Teams Player of the Year: Michael Dickson, Texas
- Coach of the Year: Matt Campbell, Iowa State

All-Big 12 Offense
Position	Player	Class	Team
QB	Baker Mayfield	Junior	Oklahoma
RB	David Montgomery	Sophomore	Iowa State
RB	Justice Hill	Sophomore	Oklahoma State
FB	Dimitri Flowers	Senior	Oklahoma
WR	Allen Lazard	Senior	Iowa State
WR	James Washington	Senior	Oklahoma State
WR	David Sills	Junior	West Virginia
TE	Mark Andrews	Junior	Oklahoma
OL	Dalton Risner	Junior	Kansas State
OL	Orlando Brown Jr.	Junior	Oklahoma
OL	Erick Wren	Senior	Oklahoma
OL	Zach Crabtree	Senior	Oklahoma State
OL	Brad Lundblade	Senior	Oklahoma State
PK	Matthew McCrane	Senior	Kansas State
KR/PR	D.J. Reed	Junior	Kansas State
KR/PR	KaVontae Turpin	Junior	TCU

All-Big 12 Defense
Position	Player	Class	Team
DL	Daniel Wise	Junior	Kansas
DL	Will Geary	Senior	Kansas State
DL	DeQuinton Osborne	Senior	Oklahoma State
DL	Ben Banogu	Junior	TCU
DL	Mat Boesen	Senior	TCU
DL	Poona Ford	Junior	Texas
LB	Ogbonnia Okoronkwo	Senior	Oklahoma
LB	Travin Howard	Senior	TCU
LB	Malik Jefferson	Junior	Texas
DB	Kamari Cotton-Moya	Senior	Iowa State
DB	D.J. Reed	Junior	Kansas State
DB	Tre Flowers	Senior	Oklahoma State
DB	Nick Orr	Senior	TCU
DB	DeShon Elliott	Junior	Texas
DB	Ranthony Texada	Senior	TCU
P	Michael Dickson	Junior	Texas

==== All-Academic ====
First team

Pos.	Name	School	Yr.	GPA	Major

== Home game attendance ==
Team	Stadium	Capacity	Game 1	Game 2	Game 3	Game 4	Game 5	Game 6	Game 7	Total	Average	% of Capacity
Baylor	McLane Stadium	45,140	**45,784**†	41,923	43,573	**45,389**	45,656	40,653	–	262,978	43,830	97.1%
Iowa State	Jack Trice Stadium	61,500	61,500†	61,500†	51,234	55,593	56,259	61,500†	–	347,586	57,931	94.2%
Kansas	Memorial Stadium	50,071	32,134	28,531	23,901	21,050	36,223†	21,797	22,854	186,490	26,641	53.2%
Kansas State	Bill Snyder Family Stadium	53,000	51,043	50,087	52,293†	52,055	52,122	51,223	49,554	358,337	51,191	96.6%
Oklahoma	Gaylord Family Oklahoma Memorial Stadium	86,112	86,076	**86,290**	86,019	**86,309**	**88,308**†	**86,117**	–	519,119	86,520	100.5%
Oklahoma State	Boone Pickens Stadium	56,790	56,790†	56,790†	56,790†	56,790†	56,790†	56,790†	–	340,740	56,790	100.0%
TCU	Amon G. Carter Stadium	45,000	42,709	44,489	43,257	42,969	**48,042**†	43,015	–	264,481	44,080	98.0%
Texas	Darrell K Royal–Texas Memorial Stadium	100,119	88,396	88,117	90,462	92,506	96,557	**100,629**†	–	556,667	92,778	92.7%
Texas Tech	Jones AT&T Stadium	60,454	54,988	58,547	**60,921**†	57,045	47,631	51,278	–	330,410	55,068	91.1%
West Virginia	Mountaineer Field	60,000	56,797	51,482	**60,928**†	57,507	55,831	53,133	–	335,678	55,946	93.2%

Bold – Exceed capacity
†Season High
