= 2018 Rose Bowl =

College Football Playoff Semifinal bowl game

2018 Rose Bowl presented by Northwestern Mutual
- College Football Playoff Semifinal; 104th Rose Bowl Game
| Georgia Bulldogs | Oklahoma Sooners |
| (12–1) | (12–1) |
| SEC | Big 12 |
| 54 | 48 |
| Head coach: Kirby Smart | Head coach: Lincoln Riley |
| AP / Coaches / CFP; 3 / 3 / 3 | AP / Coaches / CFP; 2 / 2 / 2 |
| | 1 | 2 | 3 | 4 | OT | 2OT | Total |
|---|---|---|---|---|---|---|---|
| Georgia | 7 | 10 | 14 | 14 | 3 | 6 | 54 |
| Oklahoma | 14 | 17 | 0 | 14 | 3 | 0 | 48 |
- Date: January 1, 2018
- Season: 2017
- Stadium: Rose Bowl
- Location: Pasadena, California
- MVP: Sony Michel, RB (Georgia); Roquan Smith, LB (Georgia)
- Favorite: Georgia by 2½
- National anthem: United States Army Chorus
- Referee: Jeff Heaser (ACC)
- Halftime show: Georgia Redcoat Marching Band; The Pride of Oklahoma Marching Band
- Attendance: 92,844

United States TV coverage
- Network: ESPN and ESPN Radio
- Announcers: ESPN: Chris Fowler (play-by-play); Kirk Herbstreit (analyst); Maria Taylor and Tom Rinaldi (sideline); ESPN Radio: Steve Levy, Brian Griese, Todd McShay
- Nielsen ratings: 14.8 (26.8 million viewers avg.)

International TV coverage
- Network: ESPN Deportes
- Announcers: Kenneth Garay, Sebastian Martinez-Christensen

The 2018 Rose Bowl (officially known as the College Football Playoff Semifinal at the 2018 Rose Bowl Game presented by Northwestern Mutual for sponsorship reasons) was a college football bowl game played on January 1, 2018, at the Rose Bowl in Pasadena, California. The game was the 104th playing of the Rose Bowl Game, and it was the first semifinal of the 2017–18 College Football Playoff (CFP), part of the slate of bowl games which concluded the 2017 FBS football season. The game featured two of the four teams chosen by the CFP selection committee: the No. 2 Oklahoma Sooners from the Big 12 Conference and the No. 3 Georgia Bulldogs from the Southeastern Conference (SEC). The winner qualified for the 2018 College Football Playoff National Championship against the winner of the other semifinal, hosted at the Sugar Bowl.

The Bulldogs won the game 54–48, with a 27-yard run by Sony Michel, shortly after Lorenzo Carter blocked Oklahoma Sooners' field goal attempt in the second overtime. With 26.8 million viewers on ESPN, the game ranked as the fifth most-viewed cable program of all time.

== Pre-game activities ==
Pre-game activities were held at the Rose Bowl parking lots and at Brookside Golf Course. The 2017 Rose Bowl Hall of Fame Induction Ceremony was held at the Rose Bowl Stadium Lot K on December 30, 2017 from 12:00 to 1:30 p.m.. The 2017 Class members were Mack Brown (Texas), Cade McNown (UCLA), Charles Woodson (Michigan) and Dr. Charles West (Washington & Jefferson), represented by his daughter.

=== Pre-game Rose Parade ===
The 2018 Rose Parade started at 8:00 a.m. Pacific Time and featured floral floats, marching bands, and equestrian units marching down the 5.5 mile route of the parade down Colorado Boulevard.

The 2018 Rose Parade's theme was “Making A Difference,” and actor Gary Sinise was its grand marshal.

== Pre-game buildup ==
=== Team selection ===
In the 2018 Rose Bowl, the #2-ranked Oklahoma Sooners, champions of the Big 12 Conference, faced the #3-ranked Georgia Bulldogs, champions of the Southeastern Conference. This was the first meeting between the University of Georgia and the University of Oklahoma football teams.

Traditionally, the Rose Bowl pits the winners of the Big Ten Conference and Pac-12 Conference. However, any teams may be selected every three years, when the Rose Bowl is a CFP semifinal. The Big 12 and SEC champions traditionally meet in the Sugar Bowl. The 2018 Sugar Bowl was used as the other semifinal this year, allowing any team to be selected.

As a result of Oklahoma and Georgia making it to the Rose Bowl, it was the first time since the 2015 Rose Bowl (CFP Semifinal) that the Big Ten Conference was not featured in the game. It was the first time since the 2011 edition that the Pac-12 Conference was not featured. It was the first time since the 2006 edition (BCS National Championship Game) in which one of the participants was a Power 5 team outside of the two traditional conferences. That same 2006 game was also the last time the Big 12 Conference appeared in the Rose Bowl until 2018. It was also the first time since the 1946 Rose Bowl that an SEC appeared in the game. Lastly, it was the first time since the 2002 edition of the bowl game (also a BCS National Championship Game) that neither the Big Ten Conference nor the Pac-12 Conference was in the Rose Bowl (Nebraska was still in the Big 12 at the time).

The matchups for the semifinals are geographically selected to ensure the top two teams do not play in road environments. More than one team from the same conference may participate in the game, and avoiding rematches is not a selection factor.

=== Experience in the Rose Bowl ===
Georgia won their only previous Rose Bowl appearance when their 1942 team, which claims a national championship, beat the Pacific Coast Conference (predecessor to the Pac-12) champion UCLA 9–0 in 1943, a matchup which occurred prior to the Big Nine-PCC agreement. Oklahoma won their only previous Rose Bowl appearance when their 2002 team beat the then Pac-10 champion Washington State 34–14 in 2003, a matchup which occurred since Big Ten champion Ohio State was selected for the Fiesta Bowl, which was being used as that year's BCS National Championship Game, and Oklahoma was selected to replace them.

=== Georgia ===
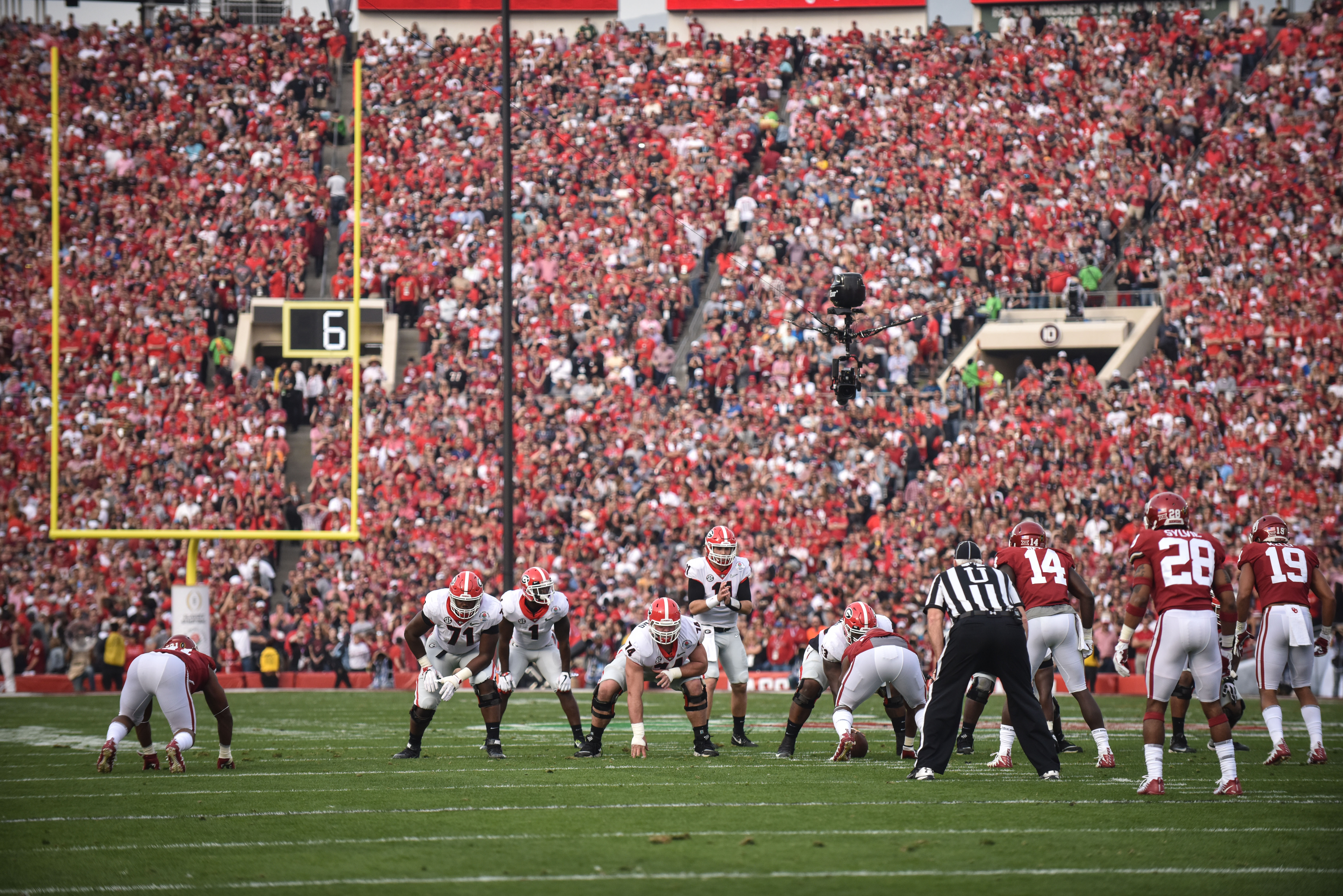
Georgia lines up on offense against Oklahoma's defense.

Georgia opened the 2017 season as the No. 15 team in both the AP and Coaches Polls. In the season opener, the Georgia Bulldogs faced the Appalachian State Mountaineers. During the first quarter, starting quarterback Jacob Eason was injured in an out-of-bounds hit that strained his knee. Freshman quarterback Jake Fromm replaced Eason. Fromm started as quarterback the rest of the season.

Georgia traveled to its first away and out-of-conference game against the No. 24 Notre Dame Fighting Irish on September 9, 2017. The score was back-and-forth the whole game, until Rodrigo Blankenship scored a field goal with 3:34 to go in the fourth quarter, giving Georgia a 20–19 lead. On 1st-and-10, Georgia linebacker Davin Bellamy sacked quarterback Brandon Wimbush, and forced a fumble, which Georgia's Lorenzo Carter recovered. The Bulldogs held the field, winning the game. The Bulldogs returned home for the next two weeks, beating the Samford Bulldogs 42–14 and the No.17 Mississippi State Bulldogs 31–3.

On September 30, 2017, No. 7 Georgia traveled to Knoxville to play longtime SEC East rival the Tennessee Volunteers after losing to them at home in 2016. The Bulldogs defeated the Volunteers in a 41–0 shutout, which was Tennessee's worst home loss since 1905. The following week, Georgia returned to Tennessee to play the Vanderbilt Commodores, winning 45–14. Undefeated No. 4 Georgia faced the Missouri Tigers back home in Athens, winning 53–28. During that game, Georgia gained 696 total yards, the second-highest in school history. When Georgia faced their biggest rival, the Florida Gators, in the annual neutral-location game, Georgia remained undefeated and beat Florida 42–7, the biggest win in the rivalry since 1982. After Florida's loss to Georgia, they fired head coach Jim McElwain. The following week, Georgia beat the South Carolina Gamecocks 24–10, clinching the SEC East and their spot in the SEC Championship.

On November 11, 2017, Georgia lost to the Auburn Tigers 17–40 in what would be their only loss of the regular season. Georgia wrapped up the regular season by beating the Kentucky Wildcats 42–13 and the Georgia Tech Yellow Jackets 38–7. On December 2, 2017, No.6 Georgia joined No. 4 Auburn in the SEC Championship, the only team who beat them during the regular season. In the rematch, Georgia took the lead in the second quarter when Georgia linebacker Davin Bellamy stripped the ball from Auburn quarterback Jarrett Stidham, recovered by Roquan Smith and leading to Georgia's drive that tied the score. Georgia took the SEC title for the first time since 2005, almost certainly securing their spot in the playoffs.

=== Oklahoma ===
In the 2017 preseason polls, Oklahoma was ranked No. 7 in the AP Poll and No. 8 in the Coaches Poll. Oklahoma opened the season against the University of Texas at El Paso Miners, winning 56–7 and showcasing a strong offense. Next, No. 6 Oklahoma traveled to the No. 2 Ohio State Buckeyes and won 31–16. In Oklahoma's first meeting with the Tulane Green Wave, No. 2 Oklahoma won 56–14. They went on to play the Baylor Bears, eking out an expected blowout but still winning 49–41.

In Oklahoma's big upset of the season, they lost to the Iowa State Cyclones 31–38. They went on to beat the Texas Longhorns 29–24 after Texas recovered from a 20-point deficit. The Sooners also began the next game against the Kansas State Wildcats with a 14-point deficit in the first half, but in a second-half comeback, Rodney Anderson scored a 22-yard touchdown with seven seconds left in the game, winning 42–35. Against the Texas Tech Red Raiders, Mayfield led the team to a 49–27 victory.

Oklahoma met the Oklahoma State Cowboys for their annual rivalry game, and quarterback Baker Mayfield completed 598 yards, winning 62–52. The No. 5 Sooners beat the No. 6 Texas Christian University Horned Frogs 38–20, taking 1st place in the Big 12. In the next away game against the Kansas Jayhawks, Mayfield accounted for his 127th touchdown, breaking Landry Jones's record as completing the most touchdowns in school history, and they won the game 41–3. During the game, Mayfield lost his captaincy for the following game against the West Virginia Mountaineers when he screamed profanity and grabbed his crotch, which he directed at the Kansas sideline. Mayfield's replacement, Kyler Murray, started the game, but Mayfield returned and won 59–31.

On December 2, 2017, No. 2 Oklahoma joined No. 10 TCU in a rematch in the Big 12 Championship, winning 41–17. The game secured Oklahoma's spot in the College Football Playoff semifinals.

== Game summary ==
Oklahoma scored on five of six possessions in the first half, and they entered halftime leading Georgia by 14 points.

The 54–48 score made this the highest-scoring Rose Bowl, edging out 2017's University of Southern California 52–49 win over Penn State.

=== First quarter ===
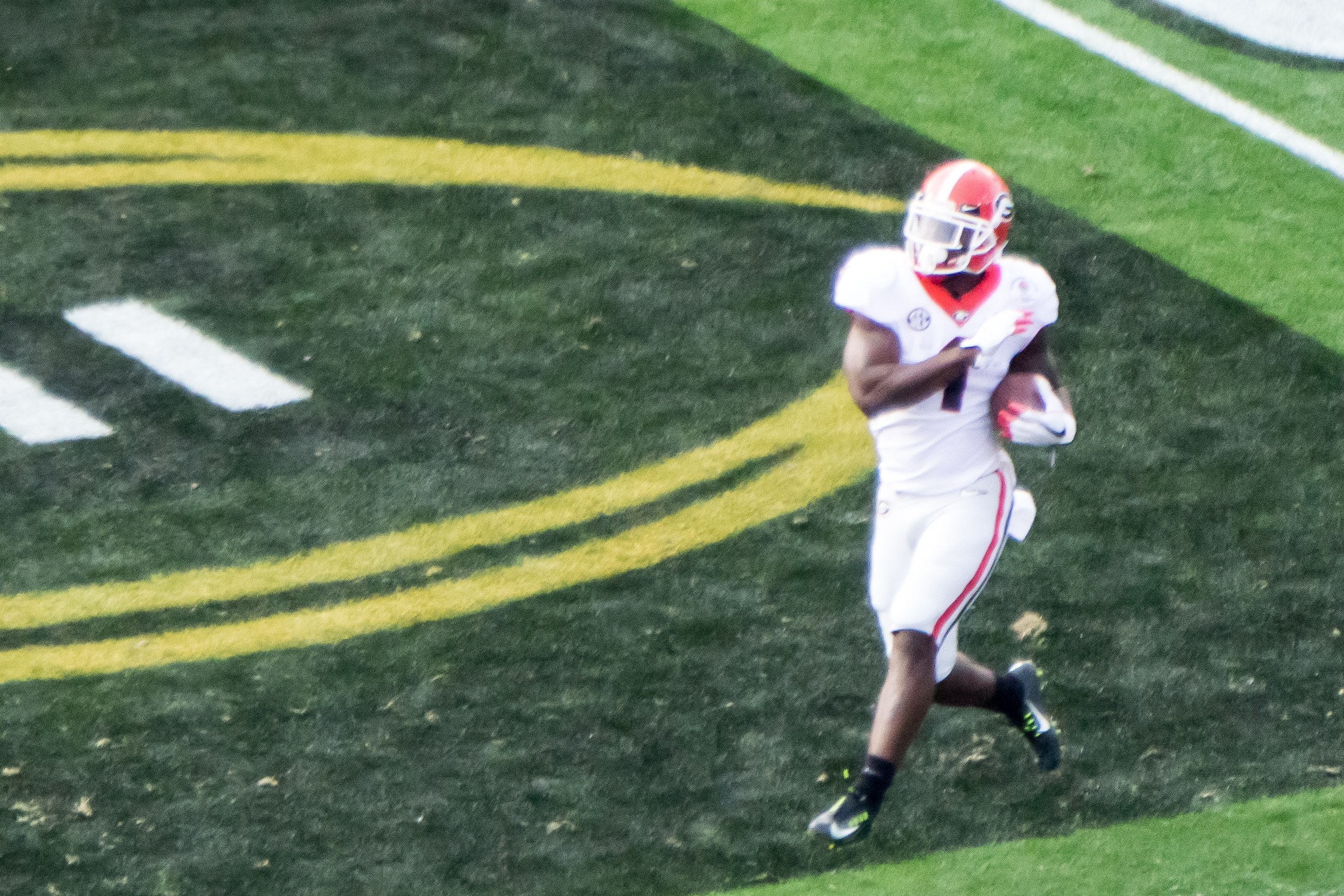
Sony Michel scores Georgia's first touchdown

After winning the coin toss, Oklahoma elected to defer and kick off. Georgia was forced to punt the ball on the first drive of the game, giving Oklahoma its first possession. Oklahoma's quarterback Baker Mayfield completed three passes, the third to Marquise Brown in the end zone, scoring the first touchdown of the day.

=== Second quarter ===
Sony Michel rushed for a 75-yard touchdown.

At the end of the second quarter, the Sooners employed a double reverse, and Baker Mayfield caught his first pass in college to score a 2-yard touchdown, giving Oklahoma a 31–14 lead.

Georgia received its possession with only 6 seconds on the clock, and Rodrigo Blankenship scored a 55-yard field goal. Blankenship set a Rose Bowl record for longest field goal kick.

=== Third quarter ===
The Sooners led 31–17 at halftime but the Bulldogs scored fourteen unanswered points in the third quarter.

=== Fourth quarter ===
The game went back and forth in the last quarter. Baker Mayfield threw the first interception of the game, as Dominick Sanders intercepted his pass. Jake Fromm completed a 4-yard pass to Javon Wims, taking the lead for the first time in the game, at 38–31.

Oklahoma tied the game back up, with Dimitri Flowers scoring a touchdown with 8:47 left in the game. Sony Michel fumbled in the next possession, and Oklahoma's Steven Parker recovered the fumble and returned it 46 yards to score a touchdown, putting the Sooners in the lead again.

With fifty-five seconds left in the game, Nick Chubb took a direct snap and rushed for two yards for a game-tying touchdown. Oklahoma did not score on its last drive of regulation game, forcing overtime.

=== First overtime ===
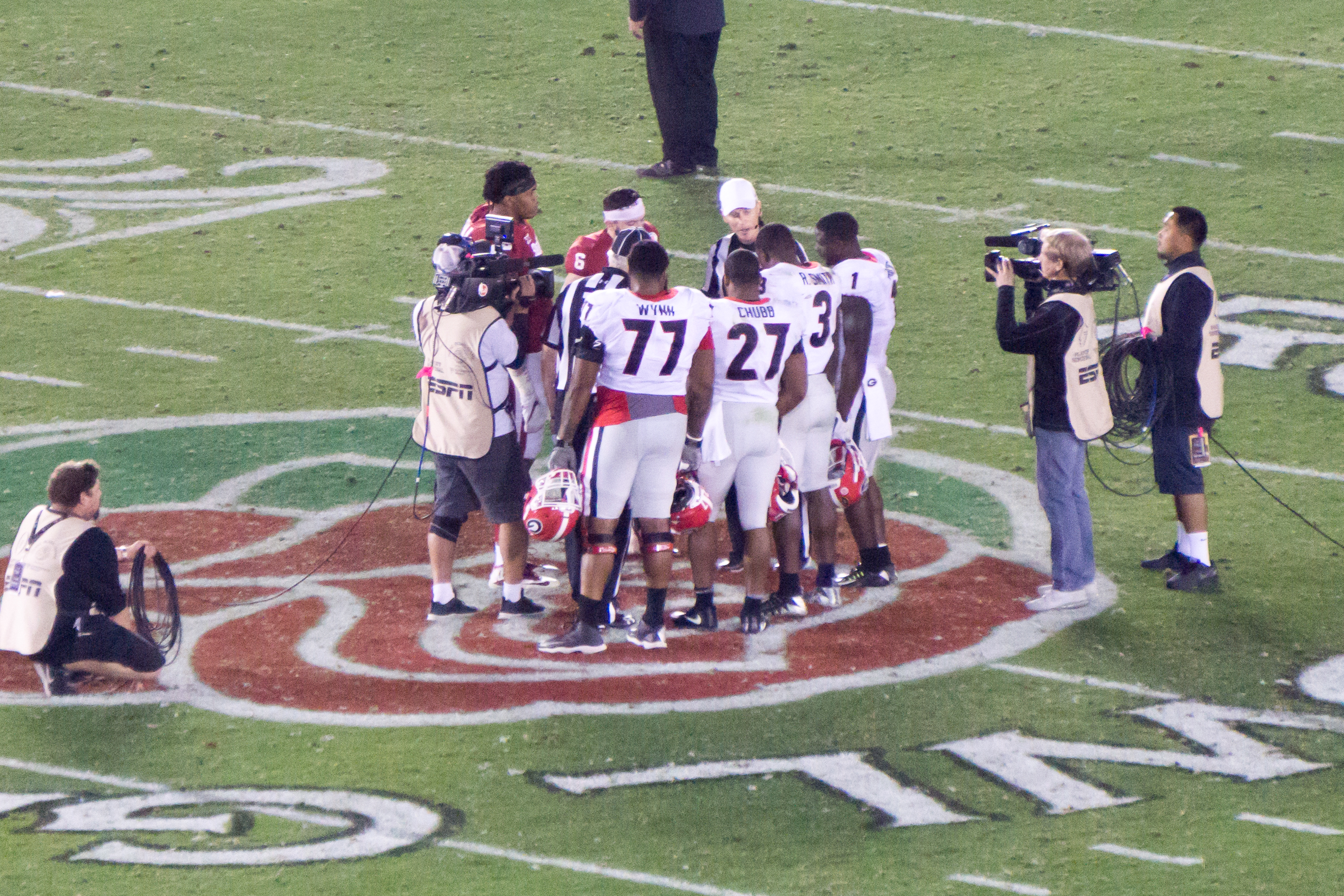
Overtime coin toss between Oklahoma and Georgia

The game went into overtime and was the first Rose Bowl in history to do so. The Sooners won the overtime coin toss and elected to play defense first. The teams traded field goals in the first overtime, sending the game into a second overtime.

=== Second overtime ===
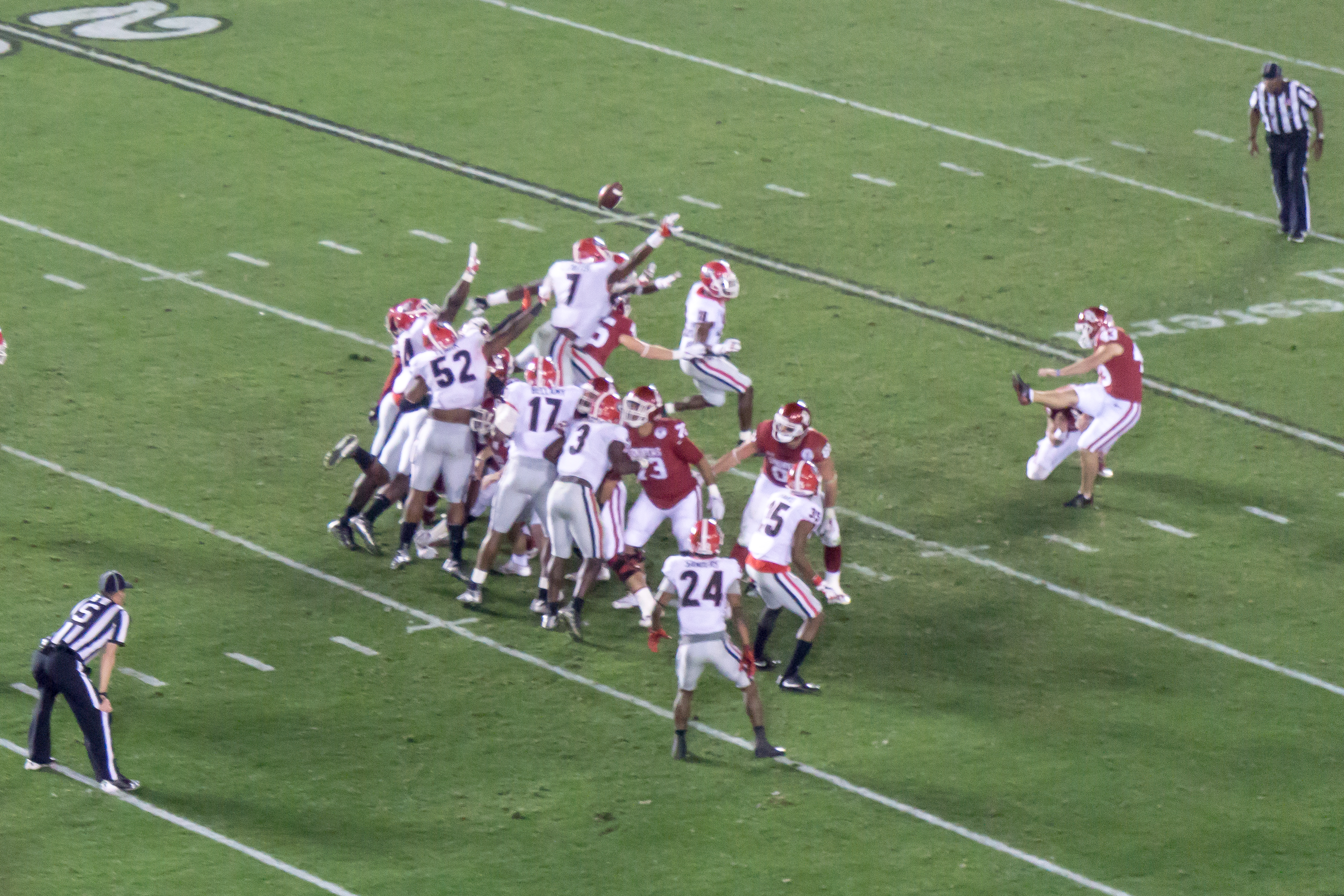
Georgia's Lorenzo Carter blocks Oklahoma kicker Austin Siebert's field goal in 2nd overtime.

Georgia's Lorenzo Carter blocked Oklahoma kicker Austin Seibert's 27-yard field goal attempt, meaning Georgia would win the game with any points during its possession. When Georgia had the ball, Sony Michel took a direct snap on a second down and rushed for a 27-yard touchdown, winning the game for the Bulldogs.

=== Scoring summary ===
Scoring summary

| Quarter | Time | Drive | | | Team | Scoring information | Score | |
| Quarter | Time | Plays | Yards | TOP | Team | Scoring information | Georgia | Oklahoma |
|---|---|---|---|---|---|---|---|---|
| 1 | 11:31 | 6 | 80 | 2:06 | Oklahoma | Marquise Brown 13-yard touchdown reception from Baker Mayfield, Austin Seibert kick good | 0 | 7 |
| 1 | 8:27 | 6 | 75 | 3:04 | Georgia | Sony Michel 13-yard touchdown reception from Jake Fromm, Rodrigo Blankenship kick good | 7 | 7 |
| 1 | 6:56 | 6 | 75 | 1:31 | Oklahoma | Rodney Anderson 9-yard touchdown run, Austin Seibert kick good | 7 | 14 |
| 2 | 14:12 | 5 | 69 | 2:36 | Oklahoma | Rodney Anderson 41-yard touchdown run, Austin Seibert kick good | 7 | 21 |
| 2 | 14:00 | 1 | 75 | 0:12 | Georgia | Sony Michel 75-yard touchdown run, Rodrigo Blankenship kick good | 14 | 21 |
| 2 | 9:12 | 11 | 54 | 4:48 | Oklahoma | 38-yard field goal by Austin Seibert | 14 | 24 |
| 2 | 0:06 | 10 | 90 | 3:22 | Oklahoma | Baker Mayfield 2-yard touchdown reception from CeeDee Lamb, Austin Seibert kick good | 14 | 31 |
| 2 | 0:00 | 2 | 9 | 0:06 | Georgia | 55-yard field goal by Rodrigo Blankenship | 17 | 31 |
| 3 | 12:25 | 1 | 50 | 0:11 | Georgia | Nick Chubb 50-yard touchdown run, Rodrigo Blankenship kick good | 24 | 31 |
| 3 | 0:41 | 6 | 71 | 2:35 | Georgia | Sony Michel 38-yard touchdown run, Rodrigo Blankenship kick good | 31 | 31 |
| 4 | 13:57 | 2 | 4 | 0:51 | Georgia | Javon Wims 4-yard touchdown reception from Jake Fromm, Rodrigo Blankenship kick good | 38 | 31 |
| 4 | 8:47 | 6 | 88 | 1:56 | Oklahoma | Dimitri Flowers 11-yard touchdown reception from Baker Mayfield, Austin Seibert kick good | 38 | 38 |
| 4 | 6:52 | | | | Oklahoma | Fumble recovery returned 46 yards for touchdown by Steven Parker, Austin Seibert kick good | 38 | 45 |
| 4 | 0:55 | 7 | 59 | 2:27 | Georgia | Nick Chubb 2-yard touchdown run, Rodrigo Blankenship kick good | 45 | 45 |
| OT | | 4 | 4 | | Georgia | 38-yard field goal by Rodrigo Blankenship | 48 | 45 |
| OT | | 4 | 9 | | Oklahoma | 33-yard field goal by Austin Seibert | 48 | 48 |
| 2OT | | 2 | 25 | | Georgia | Sony Michel 27-yard touchdown run | 54 | 48 |
| "TOP" = time of possession. For other American football terms, see Glossary of American football. | | | | | | | 54 | 48 |

== Statistics ==
Team statistical comparison
| Statistic | Georgia | Oklahoma |
|---|---|---|
| First downs | 21 | 24 |
| First downs rushing | 8 | 11 |
| First downs passing | 12 | 11 |
| First downs penalty | 1 | 2 |
| Third down efficiency | 3–11 | 7–18 |
| Fourth down efficiency | 0–0 | 0–0 |
| Total plays–net yards | 63–527 | 81–531 |
| Rushing attempts–net yards | 34–317 | 45–242 |
| Yards per rush | 9.3 | 5.4 |
| Yards passing | 210 | 289 |
| Pass completions–attempts | 20–29 | 24–36 |
| Interceptions thrown | 0 | 1 |
| Punt returns–total yards | 1–21 | 1–4 |
| Kickoff returns–total yards | 2–55 | 3–44 |
| Punts–average yardage | 6–48.0 | 7–38.1 |
| Fumbles–lost | 1–1 | 0–0 |
| Penalties–yards | 6–39 | 1–5 |
| Time of possession | 27:02 | 32:58 |

Georgia statistics
Bulldogs passing
| | C–A | Yds | TD–INT |
|---|---|---|---|
| Jake Fromm | 20–29 | 210 | 2–0 |
Bulldogs rushing
| | Car | Yds | TD |
| Sony Michel | 11 | 181 | 3 |
| Nick Chubb | 14 | 145 | 2 |
| D'Andre Swift | 4 | 6 | 0 |
| TEAM | 1 | −2 | 0 |
| Jake Fromm | 4 | −13 | 0 |
Bulldogs receiving
| | Rec | Yds | TD |
| Javon Wims | 6 | 73 | 1 |
| Terry Godwin | 5 | 51 | 0 |
| Sony Michel | 4 | 41 | 1 |
| Charlie Woerner | 3 | 21 | 0 |
| Mecole Hardman | 1 | 15 | 0 |
| Tyler Simmons | 1 | 9 | 0 |

Oklahoma statistics
Sooners passing
| | C–A | Yds | TD–INT |
|---|---|---|---|
| Baker Mayfield | 23–35 | 287 | 2–1 |
| CeeDee Lamb | 1–1 | 2 | 1–0 |
Sooners rushing
| | Car | Yds | TD |
| Rodney Anderson | 26 | 201 | 2 |
| Trey Sermon | 2 | 34 | 0 |
| Jeff Badet | 1 | 9 | 0 |
| Jordan Smallwood | 1 | 1 | 0 |
| Baker Mayfield | 12 | 1 | 0 |
| Marquise Brown | 1 | 0 | 0 |
| Kyler Murray | 1 | 0 | 0 |
| Dimitri Flowers | 1 | −4 | 0 |
Sooners receiving
| | Rec | Yds | TD |
| Marquise Brown | 8 | 114 | 1 |
| CeeDee Lamb | 6 | 66 | 0 |
| Dimitri Flowers | 3 | 53 | 1 |
| Mark Andrews | 4 | 52 | 0 |
| Jeff Badet | 1 | 4 | 0 |
| Baker Mayfield | 1 | 2 | 1 |
| Rodney Anderson | 1 | −2 | 0 |

== Rose Bowl records ==
In this game, five Rose Bowl records were set:

- 102 combined points scored by both teams is a new record set for the Rose Bowl. The previous record was 101 points set by Penn State and USC in the 2017 Rose Bowl.
- This matchup was the first ever Rose Bowl matchup that featured a team from the Southeastern Conference and a team from the Big 12 Conference, as well as the very first meetup between the Georgia Bulldogs and the Oklahoma Sooners.
- This game was the first ever Rose Bowl game in history to go into overtime.
- Georgia overcame a 17-point deficit to win the game, the largest deficit to overcome in Rose Bowl history after breaking the previous year's deficit comeback record by USC.
- Rodrigo Blankenship set a Rose Bowl record for longest field goal made with a 55-yard field goal kicked in the second quarter.
