= Tre Flowers =

American football player (born 1995)

Profile
- Position: Cornerback

Personal information
- Born: June 2, 1995 (age 31); Converse, Texas, U.S.
- Listed height: 6 ft 3 in (1.91 m)
- Listed weight: 203 lb (92 kg)

Career information
- High school: Judson (Converse)
- College: Oklahoma State (2014–2017)
- NFL draft: 2018: 5th round, 146th overall pick

Career history
- Seattle Seahawks (2018–2021); Cincinnati Bengals (2021–2022); Atlanta Falcons (2023); Jacksonville Jaguars (2024); Indianapolis Colts (2024); Chicago Bears (2025)*; Detroit Lions (2025); Pittsburgh Steelers (2025)
- * Offseason or practice squad member only

Awards and highlights
- Second-team All-Big 12 (2016)

Career NFL statistics as of 2025
- Total tackles: 287
- Sacks: 2.0
- Pass deflections: 22
- Interceptions: 4
- Forced fumbles: 5
- Fumble recoveries: 5
- Stats at Pro Football Reference

Trequille Flowers (born June 2, 1995) is an American professional football cornerback. He played college football for the Oklahoma State Cowboys. As a senior, Flowers was a first-team All-Big 12 Conference selection and led the team with 79 tackles, two interceptions, and eight pass breakups. Flowers was selected by the Seattle Seahawks in the fifth round of the 2018 NFL draft, and was also a member of the Cincinnati Bengals, Atlanta Falcons, Jacksonville Jaguars, Indianapolis Colts, Chicago Bears, and Detroit Lions.

== Professional career ==
External videos
- Tre Flowers' NFL Combine workout
- Tre Flowers runs a 4.45s 40-yard dash

Pre-draft measurables
Height	Weight	Arm length	Hand span	40-yard dash	10-yard split	20-yard split	20-yard shuttle	Three-cone drill	Vertical jump	Broad jump	Bench press
6 ft 3 1/4 in (1.91 m)	202 lb (92 kg)	33 7/8 in (0.86 m)	9 in (0.23 m)	4.45 s	1.52 s	2.58 s	4.34 s	7.17 s	34.5 in (0.88 m)	10 ft 2 in (3.10 m)	18 reps
All values from NFL Combine/Oklahoma State's Pro Day

=== Seattle Seahawks ===
The Seattle Seahawks selected Flowers in the fifth round (146th overall) of the 2018 NFL draft. Flowers was the 13th safety and the 30th defensive back drafted in 2018. The Seahawks previously acquired the pick used to select Flowers as part of a trade that sent Marshawn Lynch to the Oakland Raiders. Seattle announced their decision to convert Flowers from safety to cornerback.

External videos
- Seahawks draft Tre Flowers 146th overall

On May 17, 2018, the Seahawks signed Flowers to a four-year, $2.75 million contract that included a signing bonus of $298,729.

Flowers entered training camp as a backup cornerback, but began competing for a job as the starting cornerback after he quickly transitioned to the position and impressed the coaching staff. His competition were veterans Byron Maxwell and Dontae Johnson. Head coach Pete Carroll named Flowers a starting cornerback after injuries to both Maxwell and Johnson. He was named a starter alongside Shaquill Griffin and safeties Bradley McDougald and Earl Thomas.

He made his regular season debut and first career start in the Seahawks' season opener at the Denver Broncos, and recorded eight combined tackles and a pass deflection in their 27–24 loss. Flowers primarily covered Pro Bowl wide receiver Emmanuel Sanders during the game and allowed 10 receptions on 11 targets for 135 yards and a 43-yard touchdown. Flowers was inactive for the Seahawks' Week 2 loss at the Chicago Bears due to a hamstring injury.

He entered the 2020 season as third-string, behind Griffin and former Washington Redskin Quinton Dunbar. He played in 11 games with seven starts before being placed on injured reserve on December 5, 2020. On January 2, 2021, Flowers was activated off of injured reserve.

On October 12, 2021, Flowers was waived by the Seahawks due to his lackluster performance.

=== Cincinnati Bengals ===
On October 14, 2021, Flowers was claimed off waivers by the Cincinnati Bengals. He served in a specialty role covering tight ends, most notably holding Travis Kelce to just 25 yards in Week 17 against the Kansas City Chiefs. He played in Super Bowl LVI, recording three combined tackles and one solo tackle.

On April 9, 2022, Flowers re-signed with the Bengals.

Flowers began the 2022 season as third-string cornerback on the depth chart, behind Chidobe Awuzie and Eli Apple, though he continued his role as the team's tight end coverage specialist.

In Week 15 against the Tampa Bay Buccaneers, Flowers recorded his only interception with the Bengals, helping the team begin their comeback to score 31 unanswered points in the second half and win the game 34–23.

=== Atlanta Falcons ===
On May 8, 2023, Flowers signed a one-year deal with the Atlanta Falcons. He played in all 17 games with three starts, recording 21 tackles and two passes defensed.

=== Jacksonville Jaguars ===
On May 16, 2024, Flowers signed with the Jacksonville Jaguars. On August 27, he was released by the Jaguars for final roster cuts and re-signed to the practice squad the following day. He was promoted to the active roster on September 12 after starting cornerback Tyson Campbell was placed on injured reserve. On October 22, Flowers was released after Campbell returned.

=== Indianapolis Colts ===
On October 29, 2024, Flowers signed with the Indianapolis Colts' practice squad. On November 21, he was released by the Colts and re-signed to the practice squad four days later.

=== Chicago Bears ===
On July 22, 2025, Flowers signed with the Chicago Bears. On August 25, he was released by the Bears for final roster cuts and signed to the practice squad two days later. Flowers was released on September 9.

=== Detroit Lions ===
On October 1, 2025, Flowers signed with the Detroit Lions' practice squad. He was released on December 1 after appearing in two games for the Lions.

=== Pittsburgh Steelers ===
On December 25, 2025, Flowers signed with the Pittsburgh Steelers' active roster. He was released on January 5, 2026 and re-signed to the practice squad two days later.

== Personal life ==
Flowers is the cousin of former NFL fullback Dimitri Flowers and the nephew of former NFL defensive end Erik Flowers.
