= Erik Flowers =

American gridiron football player (born 1978)

No. 93, 96
- Position: Defensive end / linebacker

Personal information
- Born: March 1, 1978 (age 48); Oceanside, California, U.S.
- Listed height: 6 ft 4 in (1.93 m)
- Listed weight: 273 lb (124 kg)

Career information
- High school: San Antonio (TX) Roosevelt
- College: Arizona State
- NFL draft: 2000: 1st round, 26th overall pick

Career history
- Buffalo Bills (2000–2001); Houston Texans (2002); Pittsburgh Steelers (2003); St. Louis Rams (2003–2004); Atlanta Falcons (2005); Toronto Argonauts (2006)*
- * Offseason or practice squad member only

Awards and highlights
- First-team All-Pac-10 (1999)

Career NFL statistics
- Total tackles: 60
- Sacks: 5
- Forced fumbles: 1
- Pass deflections: 4
- Interceptions: 1
- Stats at Pro Football Reference

Erik Mathews Flowers (born March 1, 1978) is an American former professional football player who was a linebacker in the National Football League (NFL). He was selected in the first round (26th overall) of the 2000 NFL draft by the Buffalo Bills. He played college football for the Arizona State Sun Devils and Trinity Valley Community College.

In his career, Flowers was also a member of the NFL's Houston Texans, Pittsburgh Steelers, St. Louis Rams, and Atlanta Falcons. He was also a member of the Toronto Argonauts of the Canadian Football League (CFL). His son, Dimitri Flowers, has played fullback for the New York Jets and Jacksonville Jaguars.

== Professional career ==
Pre-draft measurables
Height	Weight	40-yard dash	10-yard split	20-yard split	20-yard shuttle	Three-cone drill	Vertical jump	Broad jump	Bench press
6 ft 4 in (1.93 m)	271 lb (123 kg)	4.78 s	1.65 s	2.75 s	4.15 s	7.21 s	33 in (0.84 m)	9 ft 6 in (2.90 m)	24 reps
All values from NFL Scouting Combine.

Flowers was selected in the first round (26th overall) of the 2000 NFL Draft by the Buffalo Bills. On July 23, 2000, he signed his rookie contract. As a rookie, he appeared in 16 games. He recorded 20 tackles and two sacks. In 2001, he was named a starter at defensive end. He appeared in 15 games (six starts total). He recorded 21 tackles and two sacks. He was released, on August 20, during training camp the next year, and was claimed off waivers by the Houston Texans. In his lone season with the Texans, he appeared in 14 games and recorded four tackles. He was released on September 2, 2003, during final cuts by the Texans, the next day he was claimed off waivers by the Pittsburgh Steelers. He was released 13 days later. On December 4, 2003, he was signed by the St. Louis Rams and was converted to linebacker. For the season, he appeared in four games and recorded two tackles. For the 2004 season, he appeared in nine games and recorded 11 tackles and one sack. On August 1, 2005, he was signed by the Atlanta Falcons. He was cut on August 31, 2005.

On March 6, 2006, Flowers signed with the Toronto Argonauts of the Canadian Football League (CFL) as defensive end. However, he suffered a back injury which prevented him from reporting to the Argonauts' training camp which began in late May.

== NFL career statistics ==
Legend
**Bold**	Career high

=== Regular season ===
Year	Team	Games		Tackles					Interceptions					Fumbles			
Year	Team	GP	GS	Cmb	Solo	Ast	Sck	TFL	Int	Yds	TD	Lng	PD	FF	FR	Yds	TD
2000	BUF	**16**	0	20	11	**9**	**2.0**	2	**1**	0	0	0	**3**	**1**	0	0	0
2001	BUF	15	**6**	**21**	**14**	7	**2.0**	**4**	0	0	0	0	0	0	0	0	0
2002	HOU	14	0	4	3	1	0.0	0	0	0	0	0	1	0	0	0	0
2003	STL	4	0	2	2	0	0.0	0	0	0	0	0	0	0	0	0	0
2004	STL	9	0	13	10	3	1.0	1	0	0	0	0	0	0	0	0	0
		58	6	60	40	20	5.0	7	1	0	0	0	4	1	0	0	0

=== Playoffs ===
Year	Team	Games		Tackles					Interceptions					Fumbles			
Year	Team	GP	GS	Cmb	Solo	Ast	Sck	TFL	Int	Yds	TD	Lng	PD	FF	FR	Yds	TD
2003	STL	1	0	0	0	0	0.0	0	0	0	0	0	0	0	0	0	0
2004	STL	**2**	0	**3**	**2**	**1**	0.0	0	0	0	0	0	0	0	0	0	0
		3	0	3	2	1	0.0	0	0	0	0	0	0	0	0	0	0
