= Ogbo Okoronkwo =

American football player (born 1995)

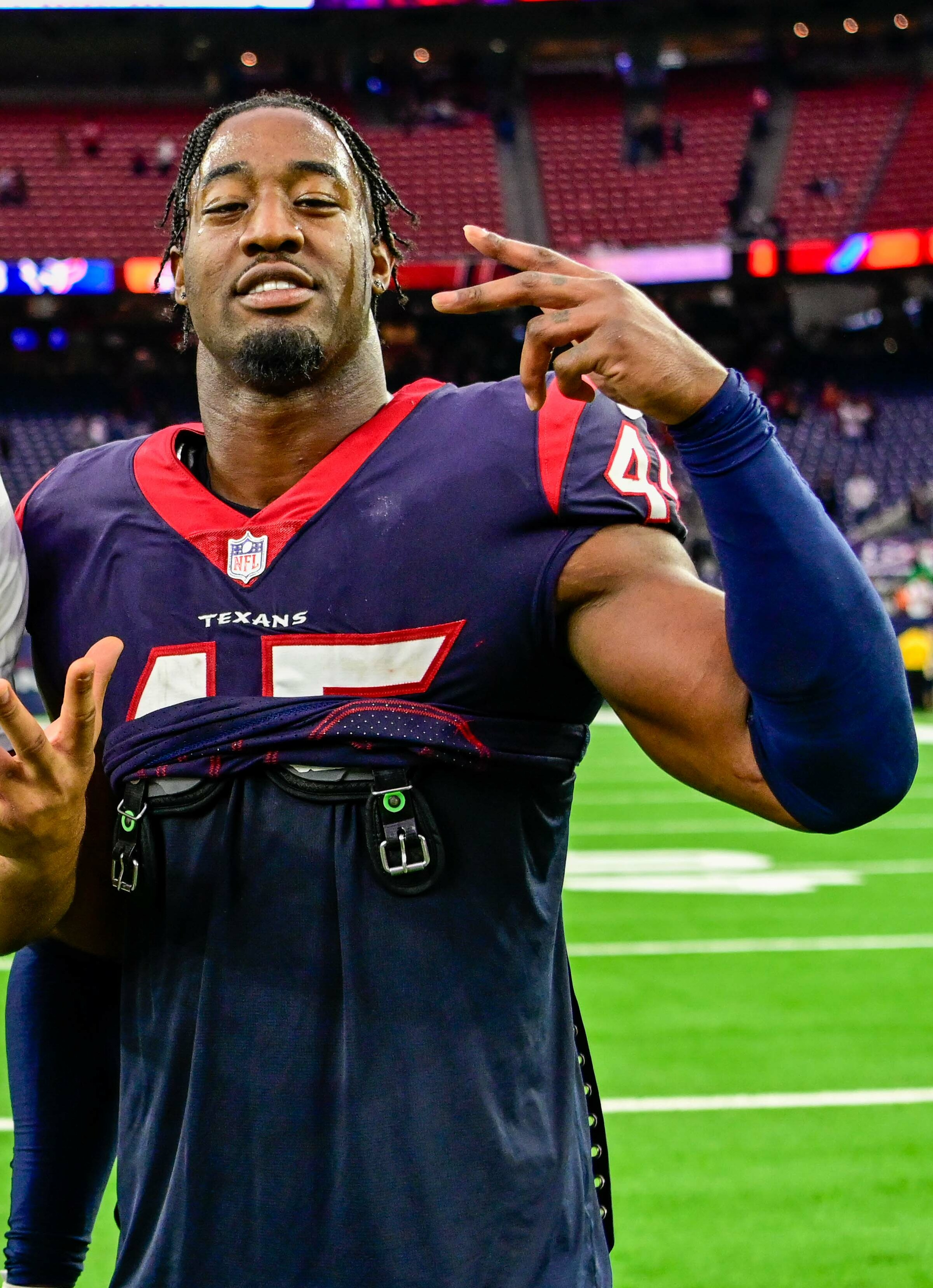
- Okoronkwo with the Houston Texans in 2022

No. 59 – San Francisco 49ers
- Position: Linebacker
- Roster status: Practice squad

Personal information
- Born: April 24, 1995 (age 31); Gainesville, Florida, U.S.
- Listed height: 6 ft 2 in (1.88 m)
- Listed weight: 253 lb (115 kg)

Career information
- High school: Alief Taylor (Houston, Texas)
- College: Oklahoma (2013–2017)
- NFL draft: 2018: 5th round, 160th overall pick

Career history
- Los Angeles Rams (2018–2021); Houston Texans (2022); Cleveland Browns (2023–2024); Philadelphia Eagles (2025); San Francisco 49ers (2026–present)

Awards and highlights
- Super Bowl champion (LVI); First-team All-American (2017); Big 12 Co-Defensive Player of the Year (2017); First-team All-Big 12 (2017); Second-team All-Big 12 (2016)

Career NFL statistics as of 2026
- Total tackles: 134
- Sacks: 18
- Forced fumbles: 4
- Fumble recoveries: 1
- Pass deflections: 4
- Stats at Pro Football Reference

Ogbonnia "Ogbo" Okoronkwo (born April 24, 1995) is an American professional football linebacker for the San Francisco 49ers of the National Football League (NFL). He played college football for the Oklahoma Sooners.

== Early life ==
Ogbonnia “Ogbo” Okoronkwo was born in Gainesville, Florida to Nigerian parents. His parents emigrated from Nigeria to the United States in 1980 for his father to pursue a pharmacy degree. The family eventually settled in Houston, Texas, where his father was a pharmacist and his mother was a nurse. Okoronkwo’s parents expected him to pursue a career in the medical field and were strict about his academics, to the point that he only began playing football as a sophomore in high school, which he (and his five siblings) hid from his parents until his junior season, as he feared their disapproval. His parents relented upon recognizing his talent and potential for an athletic scholarship.

Okoronkwo attended Alief Taylor High School. A three-star recruit, he committed to the University of Oklahoma to play college football.

== College career ==
Okoronkwo redshirted as a freshman in 2013. He then spent his redshirt freshman and redshirt sophomore seasons in 2014 and 2015 as a reserve linebacker, recording 17 tackles and four sacks in 20 games. He broke out as a junior in 2016, earning Second-team All-Big 12 honors while starting 12 games (missing one due to an injury). He recorded 71 tackles, 12 tackles for loss, nine sacks, and two forced fumbles.

As a senior in 2017, he was named the co-Big 12 Defensive Player of the Year and was voted an Associated Press Second-Team All-American, as well as earning First-team All-Big 12) honors. In 2017, he started all 14 games, recording 75 tackles, 17 tackles for loss, eight sacks, three forced fumbles, two fumble recoveries, and two pass breakups.

In his 4-year career at Oklahoma from 2014-2017, Okoronkwo played in 46 games with 26 starts. He recorded 164 career tackles with 34.5 tackles for loss, 21 sacks, five pass breakups, five forced fumbles, and two fumble recoveries. Okoronkwo graduated from Oklahoma in December 2017 with a bachelor’s degree in African and African-American Studies.

== Professional career ==
Pre-draft measurables
Height	Weight	Arm length	Hand span	Wingspan	40-yard dash	10-yard split	20-yard split	20-yard shuttle	Three-cone drill	Vertical jump	Broad jump	Bench press
6 ft 1 5/8 in (1.87 m)	253 lb (115 kg)	33 3/4 in (0.86 m)	9 in (0.23 m)	6 ft 8 1/4 in (2.04 m)	4.76 s	1.60 s	2.72 s	4.34 s	7.09 s	38 in (0.97 m)	10 ft 5 in (3.18 m)	27 reps
All values from NFL Combine/Pro Day

=== Los Angeles Rams ===
Okoronkwo was selected by the Los Angeles Rams in the fifth round (160th overall) in the 2018 NFL draft. He was placed on the physically unable to perform (PUP) list to start the 2018 season due to foot surgery he had in May. He was activated off PUP on November 5, 2018.

On October 20, 2020, Okoronkwo was placed on injured reserve after suffering an elbow injury. He was activated on December 5, 2020.

On September 2, 2021, Okoronkwo was placed on injured reserve. He was activated on October 2. Okoronkwo won the Super Bowl when the Rams defeated the Cincinnati Bengals 23–20.

=== Houston Texans ===
On March 23, 2022, Okoronkwo signed a one-year contract with the Houston Texans.

=== Cleveland Browns ===
On March 15, 2023, Okoronkwo signed a three-year, $19 million contract with the Cleveland Browns.

On June 26, 2025, Okoronkwo was released by the Browns.

=== Philadelphia Eagles ===
On July 22, 2025, Okoronkwo signed with the Philadelphia Eagles. He made one appearance for Philadelphia in Week 4 against the Tampa Bay Buccaneers, but suffered a triceps tear in the game and was subsequently placed on injured reserve.

=== San Francisco 49ers ===
On August 5, 2026, Okoronkwo signed a one-year contract with the San Francisco 49ers, reuniting him with his former defensive coordinator Raheem Morris. The 49ers released Okoronkwo on August 30, but re–signed him to their practice squad the next day. On September 10, he was elevated to the active roster for the game against the Los Angeles Rams. He was signed to the active roster on September 19. On October 9, Okoronkwo was released and re-signed to the practice squad the next day. On October 16, 2026, Okoronkwo was promoted to the active roster. On October 23, Okoronkwo was released and re-signed to the practice squad the next day.
