= Marquise Brown =

American football player (born 1997)

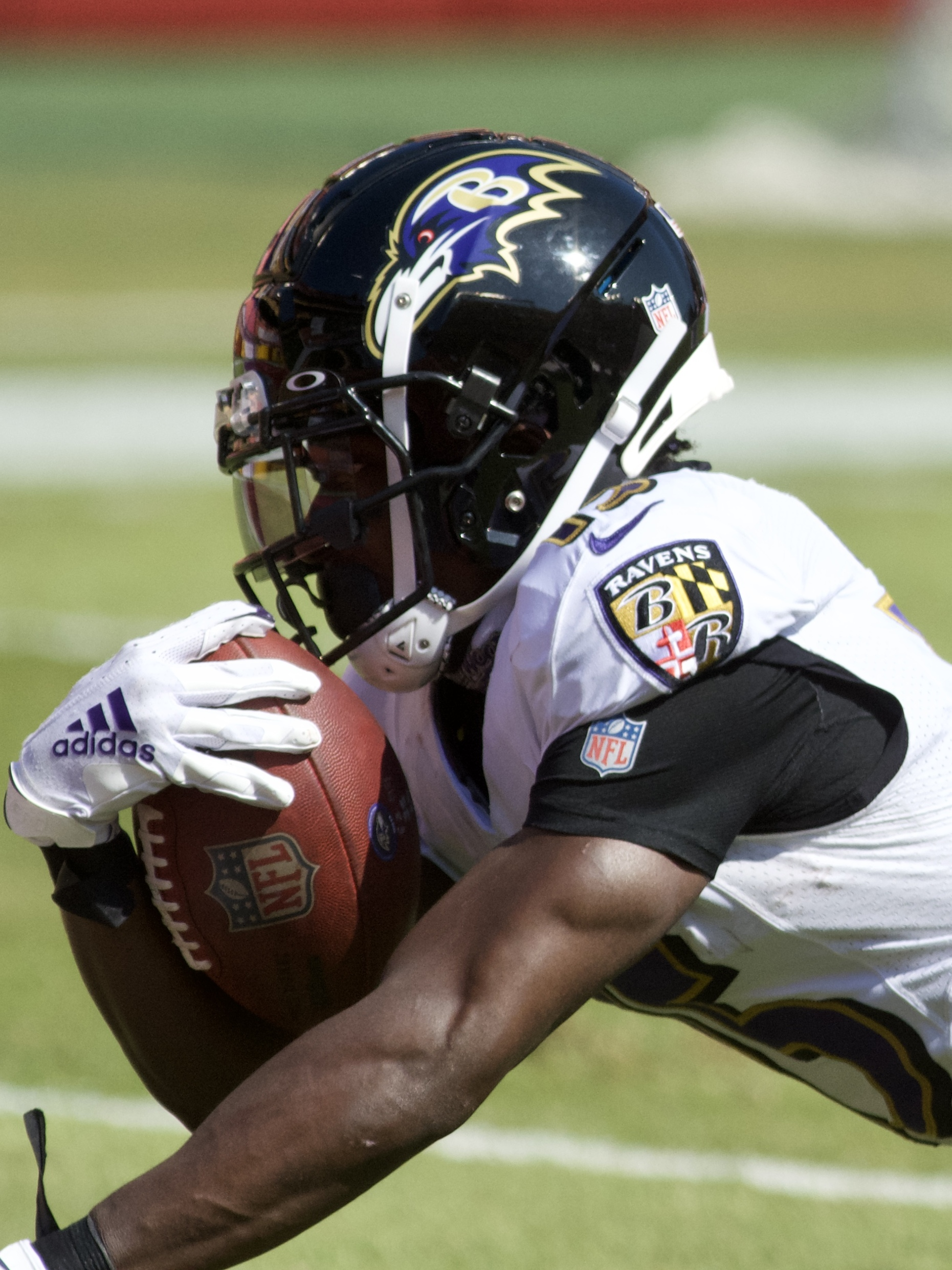
- Brown with the Baltimore Ravens in 2020

Profile
- Position: Wide receiver

Personal information
- Born: June 4, 1997 (age 29); Hollywood, Florida, U.S.
- Listed height: 5 ft 9 in (1.75 m)
- Listed weight: 170 lb (77 kg)

Career information
- High school: Chaminade–Madonna (Hollywood, Florida)
- College: Canyons (2016); Oklahoma (2017–2018)
- NFL draft: 2019: 1st round, 25th overall pick

Career history
- Baltimore Ravens (2019–2021); Arizona Cardinals (2022–2023); Kansas City Chiefs (2024–2025); Philadelphia Eagles (2026)

Awards and highlights
- First-team All-American (2018)

Career NFL statistics as of Week 10, 2026
- Receptions: 376
- Receiving yards: 4,385
- Receiving touchdowns: 33
- Rushing yards: 42
- Stats at Pro Football Reference

Marquise Brown (born June 4, 1997) is an American professional football wide receiver. Nicknamed "Hollywood", he played college football for the Oklahoma Sooners, receiving first-team All-American honors in 2018. Brown was selected in the first round of the 2019 NFL draft by the Baltimore Ravens, where he spent his first three seasons. He has also been a member of the Arizona Cardinals and Kansas City Chiefs for two seasons each, and of the Philadelphia Eagles.

== Early life ==
Brown was born on June 4, 1997, in Hollywood, Florida. He played Pop Warner football in the same Florida league with Ravens quarterback Lamar Jackson, though the two were on different teams. Brown attended South Broward High School in Hollywood, where he also ran track. He transferred to Chaminade-Madonna College Preparatory School where in addition to playing football he also ran track, with his 100-meter time of 9.09 seconds and 21.94 seconds in the 200 meters at the Florida High Schools Athletic Association's 2A District 15 regional championship track meet.

== College career ==
After not receiving any scholarships from Division 1 schools, Brown signed with the College of the Canyons for the 2016 season. Because California Junior colleges do not offer sports scholarships, Brown worked at Six Flags Magic Mountain to make ends meet. After a year at College of the Canyons, Brown received several Division 1 scholarship offers, committing to Oklahoma. During his first year at Oklahoma, Brown played all thirteen games, starting eight, and had a team high 1,095 receiving yards, becoming the 8th all time receiver in single season yards. He also posted 265 yards against Oklahoma State, an Oklahoma record for receiving yards in a single game. On January 2, 2019, Brown announced that he would forgo his final year of eligibility to declare for the 2019 NFL draft.

== Professional career ==
Pre-draft measurables
Height	Weight	Arm length	Hand span	Wingspan
5 ft 9 3/8 in (1.76 m)	166 lb (75 kg)	30 1/2 in (0.77 m)	9 in (0.23 m)	5 ft 11 3/4 in (1.82 m)
All values from NFL Combine

=== Baltimore Ravens ===
==== 2019 ====
Brown was selected 25th overall by the Baltimore Ravens in the first round of the 2019 NFL draft. He was the first wide receiver selected. He signed his rookie contract on June 7, 2019.

Brown made his regular season debut against the Miami Dolphins in Week 1, recording four receptions, 147 receiving yards and two touchdowns. Despite playing only 14 snaps, Brown became the first player in NFL history to score two touchdowns of 40 yards or more in his first game. Brown caught eight passes for 86 yards in a Week 2 win against the Arizona Cardinals. Brown missed Weeks 6 and 7 due to injury. In Week 12 against the Los Angeles Rams, Brown caught five passes for 42 yards and two touchdowns in a 45–6 win. In Week 15, Brown caught his seventh touchdown in a 42–21 win over the New York Jets, which tied the Ravens franchise record for most receiving touchdowns by a rookie. Brown finished 2019 as the Ravens' second leading receiver behind tight end Mark Andrews. In his playoff debut, Brown led both teams with seven catches for 126 receiving yards in a 12–28 Divisional Round loss to the Tennessee Titans.

==== 2020 ====
Brown recorded five receptions for 101 receiving yards in the 38–6 victory over the Cleveland Browns in Week 1. In Week 8 against the Pittsburgh Steelers, Brown recorded one catch for a three yard touchdown during the Ravens' 28–24 loss. After the game, Brown posted a later deleted tweet saying "What's the point of having souljas when you never use them (Never!!)" due to his lack of involvement in the Ravens' offense. In Week 12 against the Pittsburgh Steelers, Brown recorded 4 catches for 85 yards, including a 70 yard touchdown reception from Trace McSorley, during the Ravens' 19–14 loss. In Week 14 against the Browns, he had three drops, but also had a game-saving 44-yard touchdown reception on 4th and 5 with 1:51 left in the game. He finished the game with two catches for 50 yards as the Ravens won 47–42. He was placed on the reserve/COVID-19 list by the team on December 16, 2020, and activated three days later. Brown finished the regular season with 58 receptions for 769 yards and eight touchdowns.

In the AFC Wild Card Round against the Titans, Brown had seven receptions for 109 yards as the Ravens won 20–13.

==== 2021 ====
In 2021, Brown changed his jersey number from #15 to #5 following a change of the NFL's jersey number rules. In Week 2 against the Kansas City Chiefs, Brown had six receptions for 113 yards and a touchdown. It was his third 100-yard regular season game of his career and his first since Week 1 of the 2020 season. The Ravens would rally to win the game 36–35. In Week 5 against the Indianapolis Colts, Brown caught a career-high nine receptions for 125 yards and two touchdowns, including the game-winner, as the Ravens again rallied to win in overtime 31–25. In the 2021 season, Brown had 91 receptions for 1,008 receiving yards and six receiving touchdowns.

=== Arizona Cardinals ===
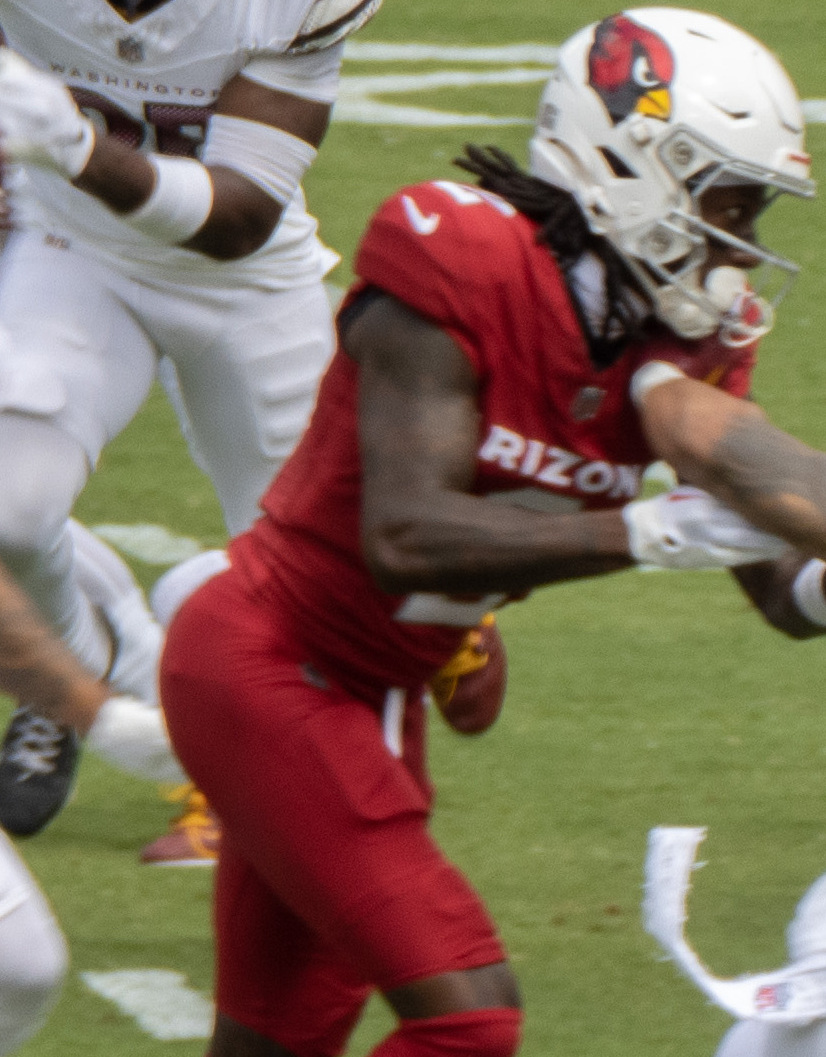
Brown with the Cardinals in 2023

==== 2022 ====
On April 28, 2022, on Day 1 of the 2022 NFL draft, Brown and the Ravens' third-round pick were traded to the Cardinals for the 23rd pick in the first round. Brown said he was unhappy with the Ravens' offensive system and had asked to be traded. The trade also reunited Brown with his college quarterback Kyler Murray. The Cardinals picked up the fifth-year option on Brown's contract on April 28, 2022.

In Week 3, Brown caught 14 of 17 targets for 140 yards against the Rams. In Week 6, Brown suffered a fractured foot and was placed on injured reserve on October 20, 2022. On November 16, 2022, the Cardinals announced that Brown was designated to return from injured reserve. He participated in the teams practices leading up to Week 11 but was not activated. He was then activated on November 26 for the team's Week 12 matchup. Brown recorded 67 receptions for 709 yards and three touchdowns.

==== 2023 ====
Brown finished the 2023 season as the Cardinals second-leading receiver with 51 catches for 574 yards and four touchdowns through 14 starts.

=== Kansas City Chiefs ===
Brown signed a one-year contract with the Kansas City Chiefs on March 18, 2024. He suffered a sternoclavicular injury during the preseason and was placed on injured reserve on September 13, 2024. On September 14, it was reported that Brown was not expected to return during the regular season. Brown made his first appearance on December 21, 2024. He appeared in both Weeks 16 and 17. He had nine receptions for 91 yards combined in those games. He had two receptions for 15 yards in the 40–22 loss to the Eagles in Super Bowl LIX.

On March 11, 2025, Brown signed a one-year contract extension with the Chiefs. Brown finished the 2025 season with forty-nine receptions for 587 yards and 5 touchdowns in six starts over sixteen games.

=== Philadelphia Eagles ===
On March 17, 2026, Brown signed a one-year, $6.5 million contract with the Philadelphia Eagles. He caught five passes for 63 yards in four games. Brown was waived on November 12.

== Career statistics ==
=== NFL ===
==== Regular season ====
Year	Team	Games		Receiving					Rushing					Fumbles	
Year	Team	GP	GS	Rec	Yds	Avg	Lng	TD	Att	Yds	Avg	Lng	TD	Fum	Lost
2019	BAL	14	11	46	584	12.7	83	7	0	0	0.0	0	0	0	0
2020	BAL	16	14	58	769	13.3	70	8	1	1	1.0	1	0	0	0
2021	BAL	16	16	91	1,008	11.1	49	6	1	5	5.0	5	0	3	1
2022	ARI	12	10	67	709	10.6	47	3	1	1	1.0	1	0	1	0
2023	ARI	14	14	51	574	11.3	41	4	2	23	11.5	29	0	0	0
2024	KC	2	1	9	91	10.1	20	0	0	0	0.0	0	0	0	0
2025	KC	16	6	49	587	12.0	51	5	0	0	0.0	0	0	1	0
2026	PHI	4	1	5	63	12.6	19	0	2	12	6.0	9	0	0	0
Career		94	73	376	4,385	11.7	83	33	7	42	6.0	29	0	5	1

==== Postseason ====
Year	Team	Games		Receiving					Rushing					Fumbles	
Year	Team	GP	GS	Rec	Yds	Avg	Lng	TD	Att	Yds	Avg	Lng	TD	Fum	Lost
2019	BAL	1	1	7	126	18.0	38	0	0	0	-	-	0	0	0
2020	BAL	2	1	11	196	17.8	30	0	2	19	9.5	15	0	0	0
2024	KC	3	1	5	50	10.0	15	0	0	0	-	-	0	0	0
Career		6	3	23	372	16.2	38	0	2	19	9.5	15	0	0	0

=== College ===
Season	Team	GP	Rec	Yds	Avg	TD
2016	Canyons	10	50	754	15.1	10
2017	Oklahoma	13	57	1,095	19.2	7
2018	Oklahoma	12	75	1,318	17.6	10
NCAA career		25	132	2,413	18.3	17

== Personal life ==
Marquise Brown is the cousin of former All-Pro wide receiver Antonio Brown. Brown received his nickname "Hollywood" from sportscaster Gus Johnson while at Oklahoma, due to his hometown of Hollywood, Florida. His father is Edwin Brown. His mother is Shannon James (née Warner).

On August 3, 2022, Brown was arrested and charged with criminal speeding for driving 126 miles per hour (203 km/h) in north Phoenix and was booked into the Maricopa County Jail.
