= Dimitri Flowers =

American football player (born 1996)

No. 38, 35
- Position: Fullback

Personal information
- Born: January 20, 1996 (age 30); San Antonio, Texas
- Listed height: 6 ft 2 in (1.88 m)
- Listed weight: 248 lb (112 kg)

Career information
- High school: Winston Churchill (San Antonio, Texas)
- College: Oklahoma
- NFL draft: 2018: undrafted

Career history
- New York Jets (2018)*; Jacksonville Jaguars (2018); Dallas Renegades (2020)
- * Offseason or practice squad member only

Awards and highlights
- First-team All-Big 12 (2017); Second-team All-Big 12 (2016)
- Stats at Pro Football Reference

Dimitri A. Flowers (born January 20, 1996) is an American former football fullback. He played college football at Oklahoma.

== College career ==
Flowers was an early enrollee at Oklahoma and was injured in the spring game but was healthy for his freshman season. On November 3, 2016, Flowers had 22 carries for 115 yards in a 34-24 win against Iowa State. As a senior in 2017, Flowers started 13 of 14 games and made 26 catches for 464 yards and five touchdowns, in addition to 22 rushing yards and four rushing touchdowns. He was a First-team All-Big 12 selection. In his career, Flowers had 36 rushes for 151 yards and four touchdowns, as well as 54 receptions for 886 yards and 13 touchdowns.

== Professional career ==
Pre-draft measurables
Height	Weight	Arm length	Hand span	40-yard dash	10-yard split	20-yard split	20-yard shuttle	Three-cone drill	Vertical jump	Broad jump	Bench press
6 ft 1 7/8 in (1.88 m)	248 lb (112 kg)	30 3/4 in (0.78 m)	9 1/4 in (0.23 m)	4.83 s	1.62 s	2.79 s	4.53 s	7.45 s	30.5 in (0.77 m)	9 ft 1 in (2.77 m)	17 reps
All values from NFL Combine

=== New York Jets ===
Flowers was signed by the New York Jets as an undrafted free agent on May 4, 2018. He was waived on August 31, 2018.

=== Jacksonville Jaguars ===
On October 10, 2018, Flowers was signed to the Jacksonville Jaguars practice squad, but was released the next day. He was re-signed on December 18, 2018. He was promoted to the active roster on December 28, 2018. He was waived on May 9, 2019.

=== Dallas Renegades ===
Flowers was picked in the tenth round of the 2020 XFL draft by the Dallas Renegades. He was placed on injured reserve on January 13, 2020. He had his contract terminated when the league suspended operations on April 10, 2020.

== Personal life ==
Dimitri is the son of Erik Flowers, a former NFL defensive end who was a first round pick of the Buffalo Bills in 2000. His cousin, Tre Flowers, is a former Oklahoma State safety who was drafted by the Seattle Seahawks in the 2018 draft. His brother, Braeden Flowers, is a current defensive end for the SMU Mustangs.
