= Gardner Minshew =

American football player (born 1996)

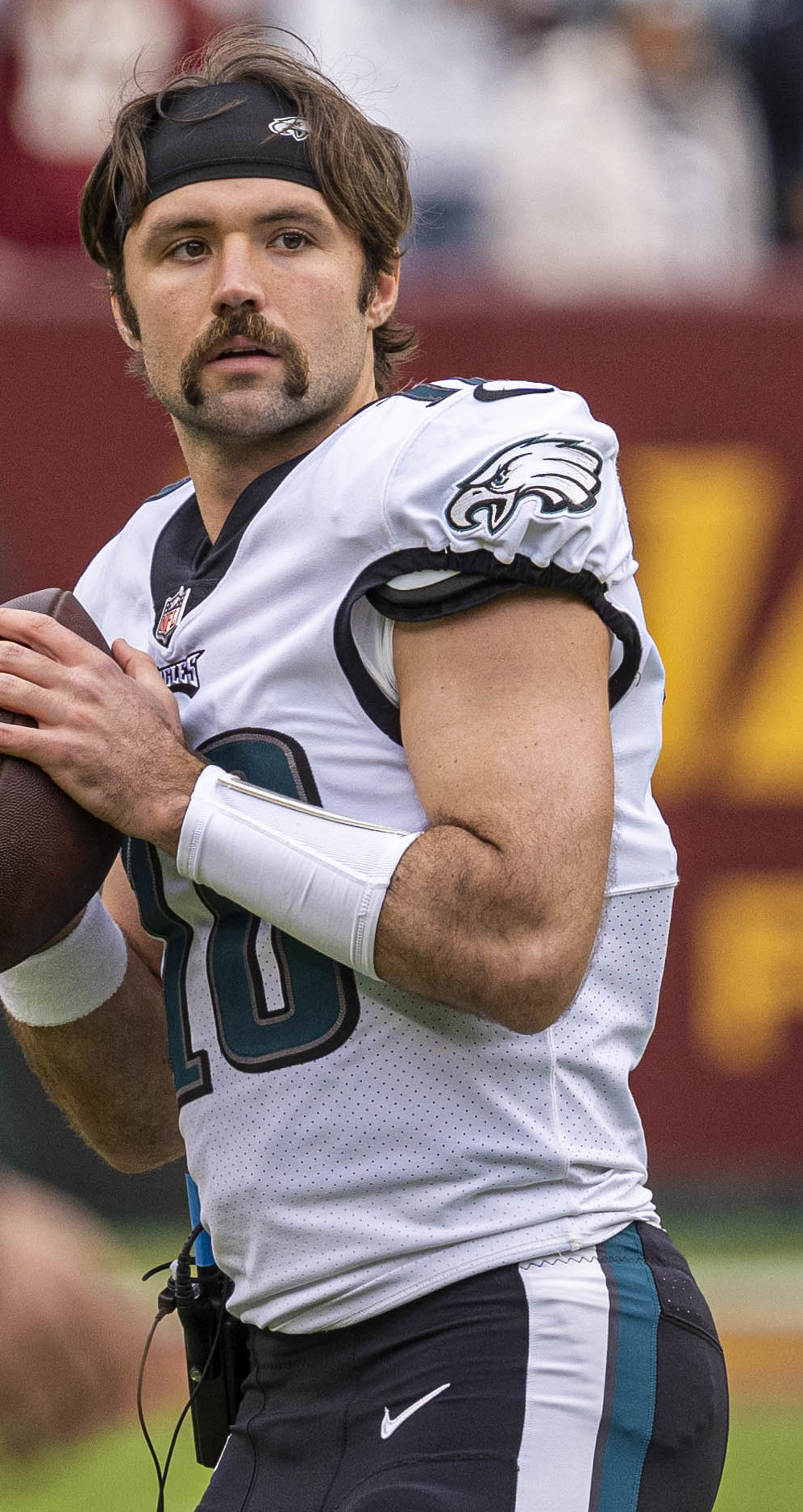
- Minshew with the Philadelphia Eagles in 2021

No. 15 – Arizona Cardinals
- Position: Quarterback
- Roster status: Injured reserve

Personal information
- Born: May 16, 1996 (age 30); Flowood, Mississippi, U.S.
- Listed height: 6 ft 1 in (1.85 m)
- Listed weight: 225 lb (102 kg)

Career information
- High school: Brandon (Brandon, Mississippi)
- College: Northwest Mississippi CC (2015); East Carolina (2016–2017); Washington State (2018)
- NFL draft: 2019: 6th round, 178th overall pick

Career history
- Jacksonville Jaguars (2019–2020); Philadelphia Eagles (2021–2022); Indianapolis Colts (2023); Las Vegas Raiders (2024); Kansas City Chiefs (2025); Arizona Cardinals (2026–present)

Awards and highlights
- Pro Bowl (2023); Johnny Unitas Golden Arm Award (2018); Pac-12 Offensive Player of the Year (2018); First-team All-Pac-12 (2018)

Career NFL statistics as of 2026
- Passing attempts: 1,795
- Passing completions: 1,138
- Completion percentage: 63.3%
- TD–INT: 71–35
- Passing yards: 12,341
- Passer rating: 88.6
- Stats at Pro Football Reference

Gardner Flint Minshew II (born May 16, 1996) is an American professional football quarterback for the Arizona Cardinals of the National Football League (NFL). He began his college football career with the Northwest Mississippi Rangers, winning the NJCAA National Football Championship, and played his next two years for the East Carolina Pirates. Minshew used his final year of eligibility with the Washington State Cougars, setting the Pac-12 Conference season records for passing yards and completions and winning the Johnny Unitas Golden Arm Award.

Minshew was selected in the sixth round of the 2019 NFL draft by the Jacksonville Jaguars, where he played his first two seasons and set the franchise record for rookie passing touchdowns. Following two seasons as a backup with the Philadelphia Eagles, he became the starter for the Indianapolis Colts in 2023 and earned Pro Bowl honors after setting several career highs. He was named the starter for the Las Vegas Raiders in 2024, but was released after one season due to inconsistent play and injuries. Minshew spent his next season as a backup for the Kansas City Chiefs before joining the Cardinals in 2026.

== Early life ==
Minshew was born on May 16, 1996, in Flowood, Mississippi and raised in nearby Brandon by Flint Minshew, a contractor, and Kim Minshew, a middle school math teacher. Kim was also a former women's basketball player at Mississippi State. Minshew and his father adopted Mike Leach's air raid offense playing style while Minshew was playing flag football in seventh grade. While doing so, he formed a bond with Wyatt Rogers, the area coach who initially taught him how to enact that style of play. Rogers was the father of future college football quarterback Will Rogers, to whom Minshew became a mentor.

Minshew began playing football for Brandon High School in 2011, serving as the starting quarterback for the all-freshman team until varsity team quarterback Trey Polk broke his arm partway through the season. The next year, Minshew helped take the Brandon Bulldogs to the Mississippi High School Activities Association (MHSAA) 6A championship game, where they lost 31–23 to South Panola. Minshew had 223 passing yards and one touchdown in the title game. He took the Bulldogs to the MHSAA South State championship as a senior in 2014, with 3,541 passing yards and 31 touchdowns en route to the semi-finals where they lost and ended their season before the championship. In four years of high school football, Minshew had 9,705 passing yards, 88 passing touchdowns, a .588 completion percentage, 1,417 rushing yards, 17 rushing touchdowns, and only 24 interceptions. He was ranked a three-star recruit by Rivals.com and two stars by 247Sports.com.

=== High school statistics ===
Year	Games	Passing							Rushing			
Year	Games	Cmp	Att	Pct	Yds	TD	Int	Rate	Att	Yds	Avg	TD
2011	9	41	69	59.4	473	6	4	85.0	13	−15	−1.2	1
2012	17	216	388	55.7	3,001	27	12	91.0	56	199	3.6	6
2013	13	186	315	59.0	2,690	24	5	105.7	31	129	4.2	4
2014	13	243	395	61.5	3,541	31	3	113.7	37	158	4.3	2
Career	52	686	1,167	58.8	9,705	88	24	102.3	137	471	3.4	13

== College career ==
=== Troy and Northwest Mississippi ===
Minshew's first two attempts at college football recruitment fell through: his primary recruiter at the University of Akron died in a car accident, while the coaching staff that recruited him for the University of Alabama at Birmingham left the program before he could matriculate. Finally, in December 2014, he committed to attending Troy University and playing football for the Trojans. He matriculated at Troy in January 2015, but left that May before he ever played in a game. In addition to describing the university as a poor fit, Minshew found it unlikely that he would unseat starting Trojans quarterback Brandon Silvers, and he began to look for other opportunities.

On June 3, 2015, Minshew signed a National Letter of Intent to transfer out of Troy and enroll at Northwest Mississippi Community College, where he would play college football with the Rangers in the National Junior College Athletic Association (NJCAA). Northwest Mississippi coach Jack Wright told Minshew that he was unlikely to become the starting quarterback there either, but he won the role one week after transferring, with his competition also transferring out of Northwest. He completed 21 of 31 passes for 332 yards, including a 61-yard touchdown, in his NJCAA debut and was named the Mississippi Association of Community & Junior Colleges (MACJC) Offensive Player of the Week. Minshew and the Rangers did not lose a game until October 16, when the East Mississippi Lions defeated them 49–16 in a second-half comeback. Minshew finished the game 18 of 37 for 211 yards, a touchdown, and an interception. The Rangers then advanced to the postseason, where they faced East Central Community College in the semifinals. Minshew went 18 of 28 for 168 yards and three touchdowns in the 27–20 victory, becoming the sixth Ranger to throw for 2,500 or more yards in one season.

After defeating Mississippi Gulf Coast Community College 34–24 in the MACJC Football Championship, the Rangers faced Rochester Community and Technical College in the NJCAA National Football Championship. Minshew completed 23 of 30 passes in Northwest Mississippi's 66–13 rout of Rochester, throwing for 421 yards and five touchdowns. After the 2015 NJCAA football season ended, Minshew was named an MACJC All-State Football First-team selection, as well as an NJCAA All-American honorable mention. He finished the season with a 61 percent pass completion rate (223 of 367) and 28 touchdowns, and was first in the MACJC and second in the NJCAA with 3,288 passing yards.

=== East Carolina ===
==== 2016 season ====
On May 3, 2016, Minshew signed a grant-in-aid with East Carolina University, which enabled him to continue his football career with the Pirates at the NCAA Division I level. There, following the offseason departure of Kurt Benkert, Minshew was brought in to back up Philip Nelson. He made his East Carolina debut in Week 1, relieving Nelson midway through the third quarter of a 47–29 loss to Central Florida after the other quarterback suffered an injury. After entering the game, Minshew completed 12 of 27 passes for 192 yards, but was intercepted twice, and coach Scottie Montgomery was ambivalent towards Minshew's performance, telling reporters, "I would be remiss if I said he did a great job". Nelson suffered another injury the next week at South Florida, and Minshew stepped in to complete 21 of 33 passes for 220 yards and one touchdown in the 38–22 loss. After that game, Montgomery told reporters, "He worked as well as he could." Montgomery also clarified that Minshew would not replace Nelson as the starting quarterback despite Nelson's injuries in consecutive games, saying, "If Philip's able to play, Philip is our starting quarterback right now. If he's not able to play, Gardner will be able to play and we're fine."

Minshew did not play again until November 5, replacing Nelson in the second quarter of a 45–24 loss to Tulsa. Minshew had career highs with 29 of 49 passes and 336 yards, but a number of on-field penalties hindered the Pirates. Montgomery attributed Nelson's benching to a nagging shoulder injury, but also suggested after the game that Minshew may get the start for East Carolina's Week 10 game against Southern Methodist, if only to preserve Nelson's health. Nelson ultimately started in the 55–31 loss to Southern Methodist, and was relieved by Minshew, the two combining for 284 passing yards. With Nelson still injured the next week, Minshew started in his first game for East Carolina on November 19, completing 16 of 25 for 238 yards and three touchdowns in the 66–31 loss to the Navy Midshipmen. He started again in the 2016 season finale, with 183 yards but two sacks in the 37–10 loss to Temple. Playing in seven games his sophomore season, Minshew completed 119 of 202 passes for 1,347 passing yards and eight touchdowns, with four interceptions.

==== 2017 season ====
Although Thomas Sirk, a senior transfer from Duke University, was expected to become East Carolina's starting quarterback in 2017, Montgomery gave the title to Minshew after concerns about Sirk's history of Achilles tendon injuries, as well as Minshew's greater familiarity with his teammates. In the season opener against James Madison, Minshew completed 7 of 18 passes for 82 yards and one interception before he was benched at halftime in favor of Sirk. The reverse happened in the next game, with Minshew replacing Sirk after the latter suffered a hit to the head in the third quarter of a game against West Virginia. He went 7 for 13 with 137 yards, including a 95-yard touchdown pass to Trevon Brown, in the 56–20 loss. Minshew played his first full game of the season on September 16, completing 11 of 30 for 241 yards, two touchdowns, and one interception, including another 76-yard pass to Brown, in the 64–17 loss to Virginia Tech. After the Virginia Tech game, Montgomery elected to start Sirk against Connecticut, citing their respective advantages: Sirk was a better runner and Minshew a better passer, and East Carolina, he believed, would benefit from a stronger run game.

Minshew did not receive significant playing time again until October 14, when he relieved Sirk in the third quarter of a 63–21 loss to Central Florida. Montgomery was worried about protecting both of his quarterbacks and wanted Minshew to keep the ball in his hands as little as possible. He finished 6 of 12 for 69 yards and one touchdown. Minshew relieved Sirk the following week against Brigham Young when Sirk injured his throwing elbow. Entering the game with a 16–10 lead, Minshew completed six passes for 121 yards and two touchdowns, bringing the Pirates to a 33–17 victory. Relieving Sirk in a 52–27 loss to Houston on November 4, Minshew completed 52 of 68 passes, setting East Carolina records for both attempts and completions, for 463 yards, three touchdowns, and one interception. Minshew played a complete game the next week against Tulane, completing 25 of 52 for 228 yards with one touchdown and one interception, but East Carolina lost 31–24 in overtime. East Carolina definitively took their next game, defeating Cincinnati 48–20 behind Minshew, who completed 31 of 45 for 444 yards and four touchdowns. Minshew and ECU finished the season with a loss: he completed 28 of 54 passes for 351 yards and two touchdowns, but was intercepted three times, and Memphis took the game 70–13. After throwing for 2,140 yards and 16 touchdowns as a junior, Minshew graduated from East Carolina at the end of 2017 with a degree in communications.

=== Washington State ===
Minshew had one year of NCAA eligibility remaining after his early graduation from East Carolina, and although he had originally committed to playing for Alabama as a graduate student, he instead joined the Washington State Cougars. Minshew had reportedly not expected to play for Alabama, but used the announcement to draw interest from other schools, at which point Washington State head coach Mike Leach called him and asked, "You want to come lead the nation in passing?" Tyler Hilinski's passing had left the Cougars without a starting quarterback for the 2018 season, and Minshew was placed into competition with rising juniors Trey Tinsley and Anthony Gordon for the role. Minshew's familiarity with Leach's air raid offense helped promote him to starting quarterback just before the start of the season.

Washington State defeated Wyoming 41–19 in their 2018 season opener, with Minshew throwing for 319 yards and three touchdowns in his team debut. The next week, he had three touchdown passes and one rushing touchdown in Washington State's 31–0 shutout victory over San Jose State. Minshew did not suffer a loss with Washington State until Week 4, when he was the subject of a controversial hit from USC Trojans linebacker Porter Gustin. Pac-12 Conference officials determined that the hit did not meet the definition of targeting, and USC held on to win 39–36. Through the first six games of the season, Minshew had a 5–1 record and an NCAA Division I Football Bowl Subdivision (FBS)-leading 2,422 passing yards, 313 passing attempts, and 215 completions. He was named the Rose Bowl Game's Pac-12 Player of the Week on October 8, following his performance against Oregon State, where he completed 30 of 40 for 430 yards and five touchdowns in the 56–37 win. On November 17, while helping Washington State to their tenth season win in a 69–28 defeat of Arizona, Minshew completed 43 of 55 passes for 473 yards with no interceptions and a school record-setting seven touchdown passes. After eleven games, the Cougars had a 10–1 record and a #8 ranking in the CFP Ranking Poll. Entering the Apple Cup against rival Washington, the winner of the game would go to the Pac-12 Championship Game. However, WSU's title hopes ended with a 28–15 loss, where Minshew completed 26 of 35 passes for 152 yards but was intercepted twice.

Washington State faced Iowa State in the 2018 Alamo Bowl, with Minshew completing 35 of 49 passes for 299 yards, leading Washington State to a 28–26 victory, and taking home the bowl's Offensive MVP award. His 35 completions in the game were also an Alamo Bowl record, three more than Nick Foles set with Arizona in 2010. Minshew finished his graduate season with 468 completed passes in 662 attempts, 38 touchdowns, nine interceptions, and 4,776 passing yards, breaking both Connor Halliday's Washington State single-season passing yards record and Jared Goff's single-season Pac-12 record. His 450th completion, made in the second quarter of the Alamo Bowl, also broke Halliday's Pac-12 single-season completions record. In addition to being named to the 2018 All-Pac-12 First Team, Minshew was named the Pac-12 Offensive Player of the Year and the Johnny Unitas Golden Arm Award for his performance with Washington State. He finished in fifth place in Heisman Trophy voting, behind Kyler Murray, Tua Tagovailoa, Dwayne Haskins, and Will Grier.

== Professional career ==
=== Pre-draft ===
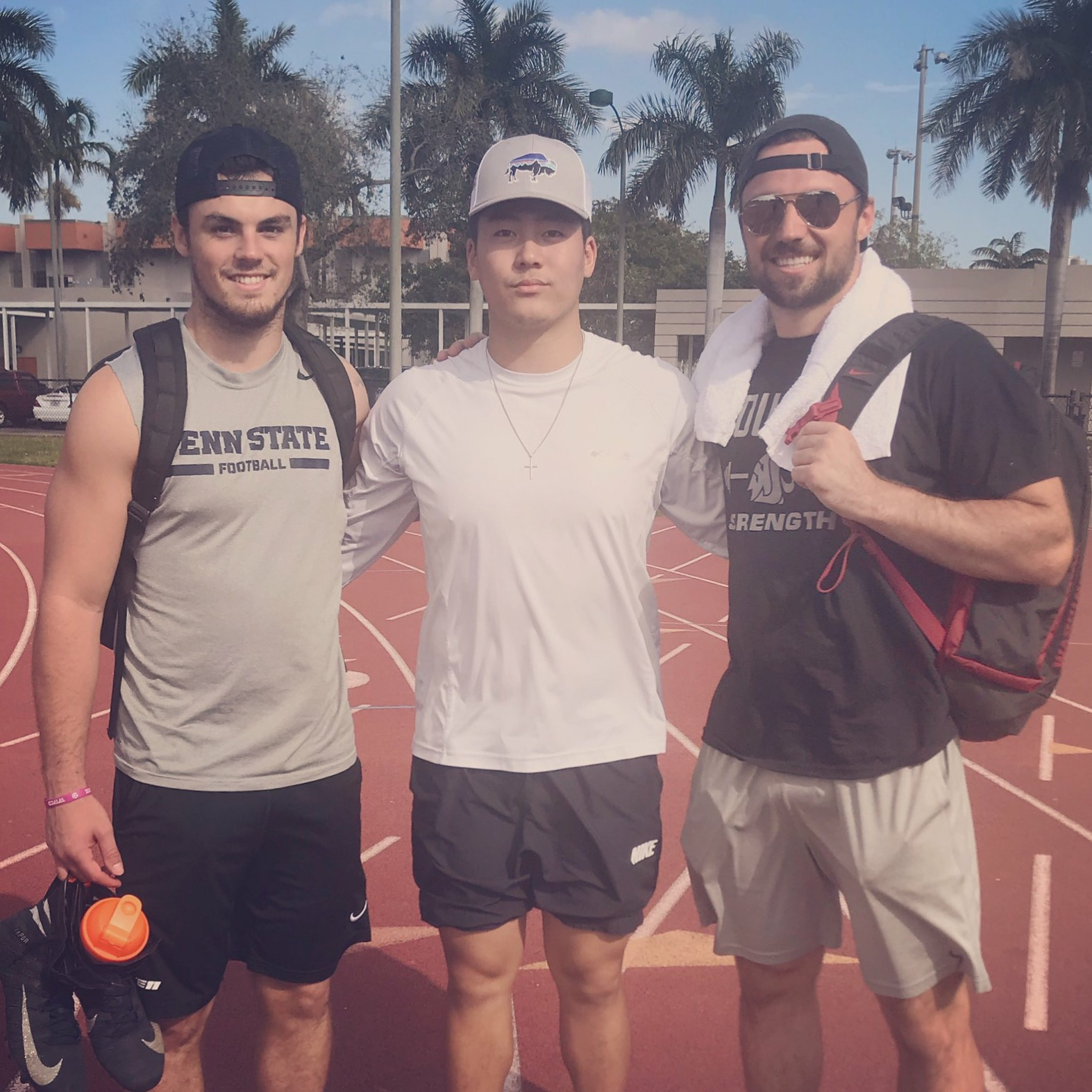
Minshew (right) draft-prep training with Shim (middle) and McSorley (left) in 2018

In February 2019, Minshew was one of three Washington State football players, alongside Andre Dillard and James Williams, to receive an invitation from the National Football League (NFL) to that year's NFL Scouting Combine. As a quarterback whose style of offense prioritizes passing over rushing, his 40-yard dash speed at the combine did not stand out; coaches from various National Football League (NFL) teams also inquired as to why Minshew had attended four different colleges in as many years. Minshew had the second-largest hand size of any quarterback at the combine, with his 10.125 inches (257.2 mm) span behind only Tyree Jackson's 10.25 inches (260 mm). Minshew was physically smaller than many of the other quarterbacks at the combine and he told at least one coach, "I know I'm too short, too slow, but I won 11 fucking games last year". He was also confident that the popularity of other passing-heavy quarterbacks like Patrick Mahomes, Jared Goff, and Baker Mayfield in the NFL would help his stock in the upcoming draft. 28 of 32 NFL teams also came to watch Minshew at Washington State's pro day, where he completed 41 of 46 passes. Of the five misses, three were dropped by the receiver, while two were true incompletions. Between the scouting combine, pro days, and Senior Bowl, Minshew spoke with all 32 NFL teams in the time leading up to the draft.

Pre-draft measurables
Height	Weight	Arm length	Hand span	Wingspan	40-yard dash	10-yard split	20-yard split	20-yard shuttle	Three-cone drill	Vertical jump	Broad jump	Wonderlic
6 ft 0 7/8 in (1.85 m)	225 lb (102 kg)	31 3/4 in (0.81 m)	10 1/8 in (0.26 m)	6 ft 2 3/8 in (1.89 m)	4.97 s	1.59 s	2.85 s	4.45 s	7.14 s	33.5 in (0.85 m)	9 ft 8 in (2.95 m)	42
All values from NFL Combine

=== Jacksonville Jaguars ===
==== 2019 season ====
The Jacksonville Jaguars selected Minshew in the sixth round, 178th overall, of the 2019 NFL draft. After being drafted, Minshew spent the Jaguars' training camp in competition with Tanner Lee and Alex McGough for a chance to back up starting quarterback Nick Foles. After both Lee and McGough were cut in August, Gardner won the job despite an unimpressive preseason, with the understanding that Foles would receive the majority of starts.

In Week 1 against the Kansas City Chiefs, Minshew made his NFL debut when Foles fractured his left clavicle in the first quarter of game. He completed 22 of 25 passes for 275 yards, two touchdowns, and one interception in the 40–26 loss. His 13 consecutive completed passes were the most of any debuting quarterback since at least 1979, and Minshew's 88 percent pass completion was the highest of any NFL player with at least 15 pass attempts in his debut. With no timetable for Foles' return and no third quarterback, Minshew became Jacksonville's starter. After narrowly losing to the Houston Texans in Week 2, Minshew picked up his first NFL win in Week 3, completing 20 of 30 passes for 204 yards in the 20–7 victory over the Tennessee Titans. Through his first three games, Minshew's 73.8 completion percentage and 110.6 passer rating were the highest of any NFL quarterback in that same time frame. Minshew had a 4–4 record, 2,285 yards, 13 touchdown passes, four interceptions, and a 92.8 passer rating by the time that Foles was activated from the injured reserve on November 5 to take back the starting quarterback role.

Foles struggled in his return, with only two touchdown drives in three games. While facing the Tampa Bay Buccaneers on December 1, he was benched at halftime in favor of Minshew. Although the Jaguars lost 28–11, unable to recoup their first-half deficit, Minshew completed 16 of 27 passes for 141 yards and successfully led the team to two scoring drives. The next day, Jaguars' coach Doug Marrone announced that Minshew would start the Week 14 game against the Los Angeles Chargers. Despite losing to the Chargers 45–10, Minshew was 24 for 37 with 162 yards and one touchdown; his one touchdown, the 15th of the year, set a Jacksonville franchise record for most passing touchdowns by a rookie quarterback. In his next game, Minshew was 17 of 29 with 201 yards and two touchdowns in a 20–16 comeback victory over the Oakland Raiders, the last game to be played in the Oakland Coliseum; he described seeing "more middle fingers today than I have in my whole life" after steering Jacksonville towards victory. Minshew and the Jaguars closed out the season with a 38–20 win over the Indianapolis Colts, during which Minshew threw for 295 yards and three touchdowns. Appearing in 14 games for Jacksonville as a rookie, Minshew had a 6–8 record for the year, with 285 completions in 470 attempts (60.6 completion percentage), 3,271 passing yards, 21 touchdowns, six interceptions, and a 91.2 passer rating. He also had 344 rushing yards in 67 carries.

==== 2020 season ====
Foles was traded to the Chicago Bears in March 2020 in exchange for a fourth-round selection in the 2020 NFL draft, paving the way for Minshew to take over as the Jaguars' starting quarterback in the 2020 season. Joshua Dobbs, meanwhile, was acquired from the Pittsburgh Steelers as Minshew's new backup. While defeating the Colts 27–20 in the first game of the season, Minshew completed 19 of 20 pass attempts for 173 yards and three touchdowns, becoming the first NFL quarterback to throw for three or more touchdowns with a pass completion rate of 95 percent or higher. Although he threw for 339 yards and three touchdowns in Week 2 against the Titans, Minshew was also sacked twice, and the game-winning play of the 33–30 loss came on an interception by Harold Landry. His poor Week 3 performance against the Miami Dolphins, throwing 30 of 42 for 275 yards with a fumble and an interception in the 31–13 loss, led to accusations that the Jaguars were tanking their season.

During an October 11 loss to the Texans in which he threw for 301 yards and two touchdowns, Minshew suffered multiple fractures and a strained ligament in his right thumb, a series of injuries through which he continued playing until Jacksonville's 39–29 loss to the Chargers on October 25. X-ray exams after that game revealed the extent of Minshew's injuries, which helped to explain his uncharacteristically poor performance through the first half of the season. At the time, he had a 65.9 percent pass completion rate, five interceptions, and three lost fumbles. In Minshew's absence, Mike Glennon took over as Jacksonville's starting quarterback, a role that he maintained even after Minshew was activated from the injured reserve. Glennon struggled in his Week 13 start, however, and he was pulled halfway through the third quarter of the Jaguars' Week 14 game in favor of Minshew. At that point, the Jaguars were trailing the Titans 31–3 and Minshew led the only Jacksonville touchdown drive in the game. Minshew started in Week 15 against the Baltimore Ravens, throwing for 226 yards and two touchdowns in a 40–14 loss, extending Jacksonville's losing streak to 13 games. Glennon was chosen to close out the season, starting the last two games against the Chicago Bears and Indianapolis Colts, respectively. Overall, Minshew appeared in nine games for the Jaguars during the 2020 season, recording 2,259 passing yards, 16 passing touchdowns, and five interceptions, as well as 153 rushing yards in 29 carries.

=== Philadelphia Eagles ===
==== 2021 season ====
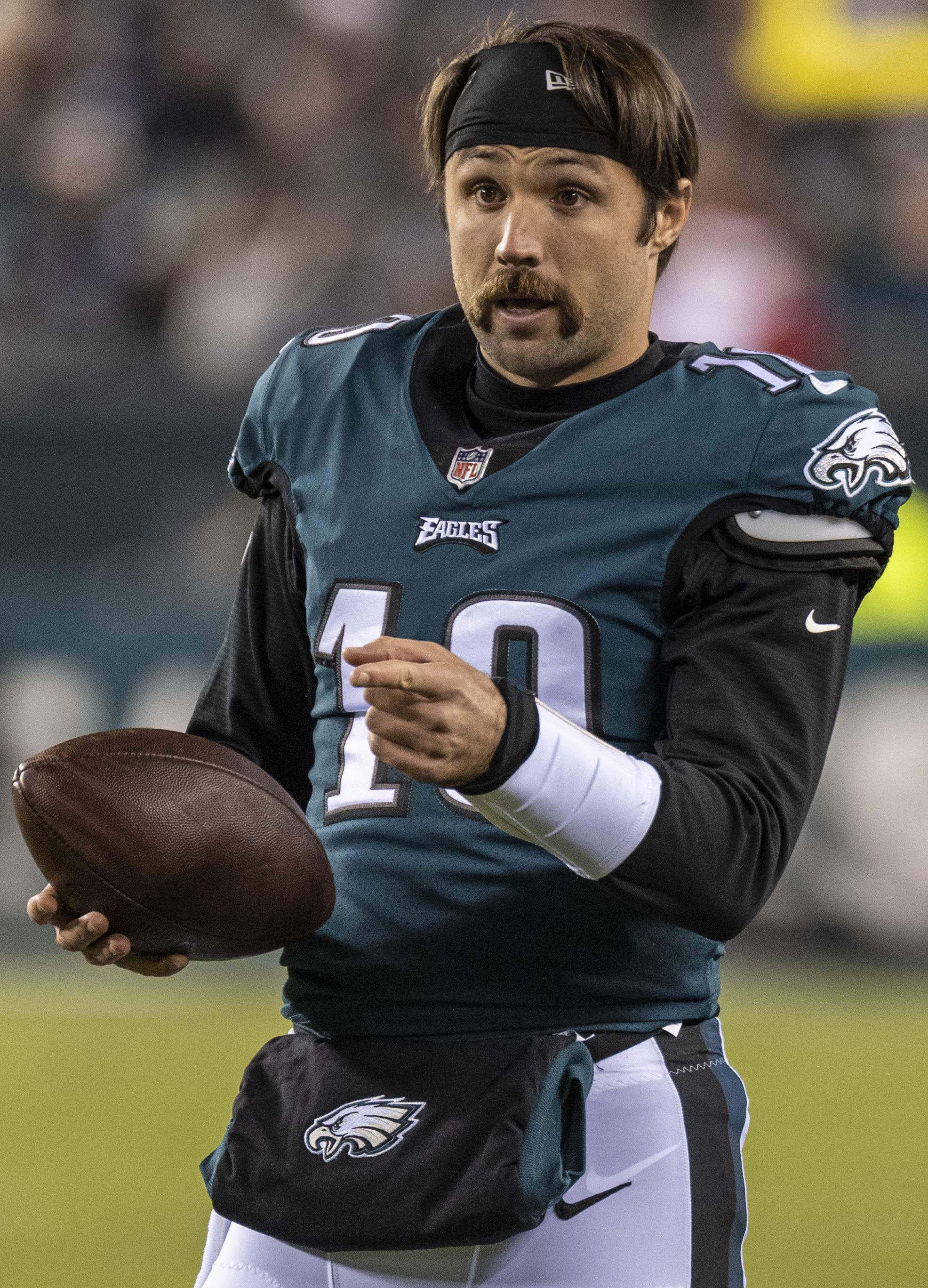
Minshew in 2021

On August 28, 2021, the Jaguars traded Minshew to the Philadelphia Eagles in exchange for a conditional sixth-round pick in the 2022 NFL draft; in a corresponding move, the Eagles released quarterback Nick Mullens.

Minshew made his first start of the season in Week 13 after starting quarterback Jalen Hurts was sidelined with an ankle injury. Facing the New York Jets, Minshew completed 20 of 25 passes for 242 yards and two touchdowns, lifting the Eagles to a 33–18 finish. He had a perfect 158.3 quarterback rating through the first half of the game, and tied Donovan McNabb with a 93.3 percent first-half completion rate, the highest by an Eagles quarterback in 30 years. Following the game, Minshew asked Nick Sirianni what it would take to become the Eagles' starting quarterback over Hurts, a conversation that Sirianni dismissed. In response, Minshew decided he was "going to do everything [he] can to put [him]self in that position at some point". Hurts' ankle injury recovered over the Eagles' subsequent bye week, and Minshew returned to the backup role for the Eagles' Week 15 game against the Washington Football Team. Minshew was asked to start again in the Eagles' regular-season finale against division rival Dallas Cowboys, giving Hurts an opportunity to rest before the 2021–22 NFL playoffs began the following week. Passing primarily to other reserve players on a roster that had been diminished by COVID-19 protocols, Minshew completed 19 of 33 passes for 186 yards, two touchdowns, and an interception during the 51–26 loss.

==== 2022 season ====
Minshew entered the 2022 season as Hurts's backup quarterback. He made his first appearance of the season in Week 8, relieving Hurts for the final ten minutes of the Eagles' 35–13 victory over the Pittsburgh Steelers. He went 1-for-2 with 23 yards in his limited outing. Minshew appeared again at the end of the Eagles' Week 13 game against the Titans. He went 1-for-2 for 11 yards as Philadelphia took a 35–10 victory.

After Hurts suffered a right shoulder sprain during the Eagles' Week 15 game against the Chicago Bears, Minshew was named the starting quarterback for the Eagles' Christmas Eve game against the Cowboys. He finished the game with 355 passing yards, two touchdowns, and two interceptions as the Eagles lost 34–40. Minshew started the Eagles' next game against the New Orleans Saints as well and passed for 274 yards and one touchdown, but also threw an interception that was returned for a touchdown by Saints' cornerback Marshon Lattimore in the fourth quarter of a 20–10 loss.

=== Indianapolis Colts ===
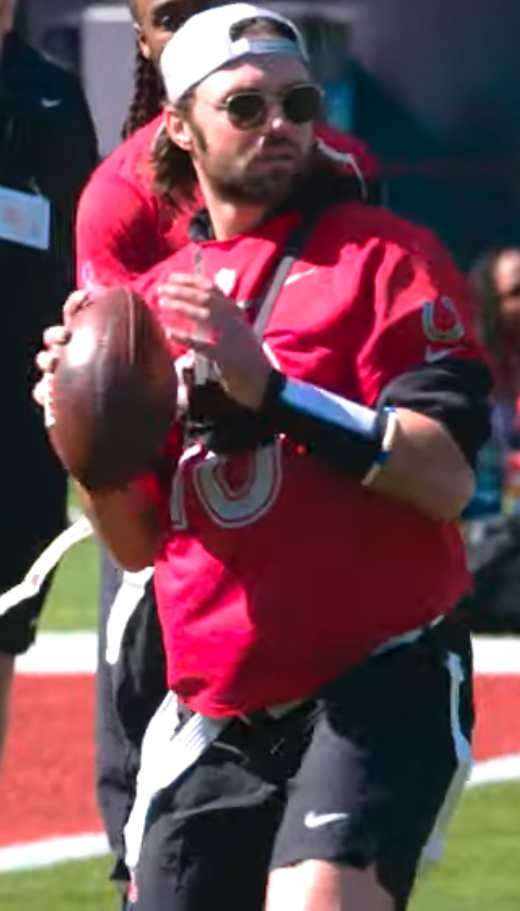
Minshew at the 2024 Pro Bowl

On March 17, 2023, Minshew signed a one-year, $3.5 million contract with the Indianapolis Colts, that could go up to $5.5 million with incentives.

On September 24, Minshew made his first start of the season against the Baltimore Ravens due to designated starting quarterback Anthony Richardson being out on concussion protocol. He led them to a 22–19 overtime victory, completing 27 passes on 44 throws for 227 yards and a touchdown. Minshew was named the starting quarterback for the Colts after Richardson suffered an AC joint sprain in Week 5 against the Titans; the latter was placed on injured reserve for the rest of the season. Through 13 starts, Minshew threw for a career-high 3,305 yards, 15 touchdowns, and nine interceptions. He went 7–6 as a starter and led the Colts to a 9–8 record, falling just short of the playoffs. He was named to his first career Pro Bowl as an alternate after the season.

=== Las Vegas Raiders ===
Minshew signed a two-year deal with the Las Vegas Raiders on March 14, 2024 worth $25 million. He was named the team's starting quarterback on August 18. In Week 2, Minshew rallied the Raiders to an upset road victory over the Ravens, orchestrating three scoring drives in the fourth quarter to overcome a 10-point deficit. Through five games, Minshew completed 70.7% of his passes for 1,014 yards and four touchdowns but also threw five interceptions, including a 100-yard pick-six in a Week 5 loss to the Denver Broncos. After the Raiders dropped to 2–3, Minshew was benched for Aidan O'Connell on October 9. In Week 7 against the Los Angeles Rams, Minshew replaced an injured O'Connell during the first half and committed four turnovers in relief as the Raiders lost 20–15. In Week 12, in a 29–19 loss to the Denver Broncos, Minshew sustained a season-ending broken collarbone when a tackle by Cody Barton drove Minshew's left shoulder into the turf.

Minshew was released by the Raiders on March 12, 2025.

=== Kansas City Chiefs ===
On March 17, 2025, Minshew signed a one-year, $1.17 million contract with the Kansas City Chiefs. Following a season-ending knee injury to starter Patrick Mahomes in Week 15, Minshew was named the starter for the Week 16 matchup against the Titans, but suffered a non-displaced tibial plateau fracture in the game, ending his season.

=== Arizona Cardinals ===
On March 12, 2026, Minshew signed a one-year, $5.75 million contract with the Arizona Cardinals. On November 1, 2026 the Arizona Cardinals replaced a struggling Jacoby Brissett mid-game, marking Minshew's first appearance with his new team. Minshew went on to lead the Cardinals to a 33–30 overtime win vs. Dallas Cowboys. The next day, Minshew was named the Cardinals starting quarterback. He made his first start in Week 9, but suffered a torn UCL and was placed on season-ending injured reserve on November 10.

== Career statistics ==
=== NFL ===
==== Regular season ====
Year	Team	Games			Passing									Rushing					Sacks		Fumbles	
Year	Team	GP	GS	Record	Cmp	Att	Pct	Yds	Y/A	Lng	TD	Int	Rtg	Att	Yds	Avg	Lng	TD	Sck	SckY	Fum	Lost
2019	JAX	14	12	6–6	285	470	60.6	3,271	7.0	70	21	6	91.2	67	344	5.1	21	0	33	184	13	7
2020	JAX	9	8	1–7	216	327	66.1	2,259	6.9	51	16	5	95.9	29	153	5.3	16	1	27	147	5	4
2021	PHI	4	2	1–1	41	60	68.3	439	7.3	36	4	1	104.8	9	21	2.3	9	0	5	31	1	0
2022	PHI	5	2	0–2	44	76	57.9	663	8.7	78	3	3	83.4	7	3	0.4	3	1	6	28	4	1
2023	IND	17	13	7–6	305	490	62.2	3,305	6.7	75	15	9	84.6	34	100	2.9	23	3	34	187	8	5
2024	LV	10	9	2–7	203	306	66.3	2,013	6.6	57	9	10	81.0	19	58	3.1	11	0	29	164	6	4
2025	KC	4	1	0–1	6	13	46.2	37	2.8	12	0	1	21.0	6	2	0.3	8	0	0	0	0	0
2026	ARI	2	1	1–1	38	53	71.7	354	6.7	27	3	0	108.5	1	4	4.0	4	0	4	24	1	0
Career		65	48	18-31	1,138	1,795	63.4	12,341	6.9	78	71	35	88.6	172	685	4.0	23	5	138	765	38	21

==== Postseason ====
Year	Team	Games			Passing									Rushing					Sacks		Fumbles	
Year	Team	GP	GS	Record	Cmp	Att	Pct	Yds	Avg	Lng	TD	Int	Rtg	Att	Yds	Avg	Lng	TD	Sck	SckY	Fum	Lost
2021	PHI	0	0	—	DNP																	
2022	PHI	2	0	—	0	0	0.0	0	0.0	0	0	0	0.0	2	−2	−1.0	−1	0	0	0	0	0
Career		2	0	—	0	0	0.0	0	0.0	0	0	0	0.0	2	−2	−1.0	−1	0	0	0	0	0

=== College ===
Season	Team	Games			Passing								Rushing			
Season	Team	GP	GS	Record	Cmp	Att	Pct	Yds	Avg	TD	Int	Rtg	Att	Yds	Avg	TD
2015	Northwest Mississippi	12	12	11–1	223	367	60.8	3,288	8.9	28	5	158.5	37	33	0.9	3
2016	East Carolina	7	2	0–2	119	202	58.9	1,347	6.7	8	4	124.0	20	−36	−1.8	0
2017	East Carolina	10	5	1–4	174	304	57.2	2,140	7.0	16	7	129.1	18	−40	−2.2	0
2018	Washington State	13	13	11–2	468	662	70.7	4,776	7.2	38	9	147.5	58	119	2.1	4
Career		42	32	23–9	984	1,535	64.1	11,551	7.5	90	25	143.4	133	76	0.6	7

== Career highlights ==
=== Awards and honors ===
Award	Year	Ref.
NJCAA
NJCAA National Football Champion	2015	
MACJC All-State Football First-team	2015	
NJCAA All-American honorable mention	2015	
NCAA
Alamo Bowl championship	2018	
Alamo Bowl Offensive MVP	2018	
All-Pac-12 First Team	2018	
Pac-12 Offensive Player of the Year	2018	
Johnny Unitas Golden Arm Award	2018	
NFL
Pro Bowl	2023	

=== Records ===
Jacksonville Jaguars

- Most passing touchdowns by a rookie: 21
- Highest completion percentage in a game: 88% (September 8, 2019)

== Personal life ==
Minshew was named after his father, Gardner Flint Minshew, a fact that most fans and sportswriters did not initially realize because the elder Minshew is often referred to by his middle name. He goes by "Minshew II" rather than "Minshew Jr." at his mother's request, as she did not want her son to be nicknamed "Junior" or "Bubba". His grandfather originally wanted Minshew to be named "Beowulf", after the Old English hero, but his parents rejected the idea.

Minshew is a Christian. Outside of football, Minshew is known for his distinctive physical appearance and exercise habits, which have generated several nicknames. He began growing his signature Fu Manchu-style mustache at East Carolina, and it has been adopted by Minshew's fans, some of whom wear fake mustaches to his NFL games. During his tenure with Jacksonville, he also had a distinctive mullet, which he cut off after the 2020 season. This appearance awarded Minshew the nickname "Uncle Rico", based on the similarly styled character from the 2004 film Napoleon Dynamite. His decision to wear aviator sunglasses and a flight jacket before his first game at Lincoln Financial Field also drew comparisons to the film Top Gun. Minshew was also given the nickname "Jock Strap King" by former-Jacksonville running back Leonard Fournette, after the quarterback's propensity for exercising in nothing but the eponymous underwear. The pornographic video service CamSoda once offered Minshew a one-million-dollar endorsement deal based on his exercise habit.

While playing for Northwest Mississippi, Minshew had a cameo appearance in the Netflix documentary miniseries Last Chance U. The film featured the college football program at East Mississippi, whose defeat of Minshew and Northwest Mississippi was featured in the series.
