= 2018 Alamo Bowl =

College football bowl game

2018 Valero Alamo Bowl
- 26th Alamo Bowl
Iowa State Cyclones	Washington State Cougars
(8–4)	(10–2)
Big 12	Pac-12
26	28
Head coach: Matt Campbell	Head coach: Mike Leach
AP / Coaches / CFP; 25 / RV / 24	AP / Coaches / CFP; 12 / 13 / 13
	1	2	3	4	Total
Iowa State	0	10	10	6	26
Washington State	7	14	0	7	28
- Date: December 28, 2018
- Season: 2018
- Stadium: Alamodome
- Location: San Antonio, Texas
- MVP: Gardner Minshew (QB, Washington State); Peyton Pelluer (LB, Washington State)
- Favorite: Washington State by 3.5
- Referee: John O’Neill (Big Ten)
- Attendance: 60,675
- Payout: US$7,975,000

United States TV coverage
- Network: ESPN & ESPN Radio
- Announcers: Dave Pasch, Greg McElroy and Tom Luginbill (ESPN); Roy Philpott, Tom Ramsey and Alex Corddry (ESPN Radio)

The 2018 Alamo Bowl was a college football bowl game that was played on December 28, 2018. It was the 26th edition of the Alamo Bowl, and one of the 2018–19 bowl games concluding the 2018 FBS football season. Sponsored by Valero Energy, the game was officially known as the Valero Alamo Bowl.

== Teams ==
The game was played between Iowa State from the Big 12 Conference and Washington State from the Pac-12 Conference. This was the first meeting between the two programs.

=== Iowa State Cyclones ===
Iowa State received and accepted a bid to the Alamo Bowl on December 2. The Cyclones entered the bowl with an 8–4 record (6–3 in the Big 12).

=== Washington State Cougars ===
Washington State received and accepted a bid to the Alamo Bowl on December 2. The Cougars entered the bowl with a 10–2 record (7–2 in the Pac-12).

== Game summary ==
=== Scoring summary ===
Scoring summary

Quarter	Time	Drive			Team	Scoring information	Score	
Quarter	Time	Plays	Yards	TOP	Team	Scoring information	ISU	WSU
1	6:55	3	20	0:53	WSU	Renard Bell 22-yard touchdown reception from Gardner Minshew, Blake Mazza kick good	0	7
2	6:08	13	88	5:55	WSU	Gardner Minshew 7-yard touchdown run, Blake Mazza kick good	0	14
2	4:26	4	69	1:42	ISU	Brock Purdy 9-yard touchdown run, Connor Assalley kick good	7	14
2	1:02	8	54	3:24	WSU	Dezmon Patmon 9-yard touchdown reception from Gardner Minshew, Blake Mazza kick good	7	21
2	0:00	5	42	1:02	ISU	50-yard field goal by Connor Assalley	10	21
3	12:11	7	73	2:49	ISU	David Montgomery 8-yard touchdown run, Connor Assalley kick good	17	21
3	1:04	14	74	6:36	ISU	23-yard field goal by Connor Assalley	20	21
4	10:24	4	30	0:53	WSU	Max Borghi 10-yard touchdown run, Blake Mazza kick good	20	28
4	4:02	5	74	2:46	ISU	Brock Purdy 1-yard touchdown run, 2-point pass failed	26	28
"TOP" = time of possession. For other American football terms, see Glossary of American football.							26	28

=== Statistics ===
	1	2	3	4	Total
No. 24 Cyclones	0	10	10	6	26
No. 13 Cougars	7	14	0	7	28

Statistics	ISU	WSU
First downs	22	19
Plays–yards	66–515	66–327
Rushes–yards	39–200	17–28
Passing yards	315	299
Passing: comp–att–int	18–27–2	35–49–0
Time of possession	29:33	30:27

Team	Category	Player	Statistics
Iowa State	Passing	Brock Purdy	18/27, 315 yds, 2 INT
Iowa State	Rushing	David Montgomery	26 car, 124 yds, 1 TD
Iowa State	Receiving	Hakeem Butler	9 rec, 192 yds
Washington State	Passing	Gardner Minshew	35/49, 299 yds, 2 TD
Washington State	Rushing	Gardner Minshew	6 car, 16 yds, 1 TD
Washington State	Receiving	Dezmon Patmon	6 rec, 76 yds, 1 TD
