= David Montgomery (American football) =

American football player (born 1997)

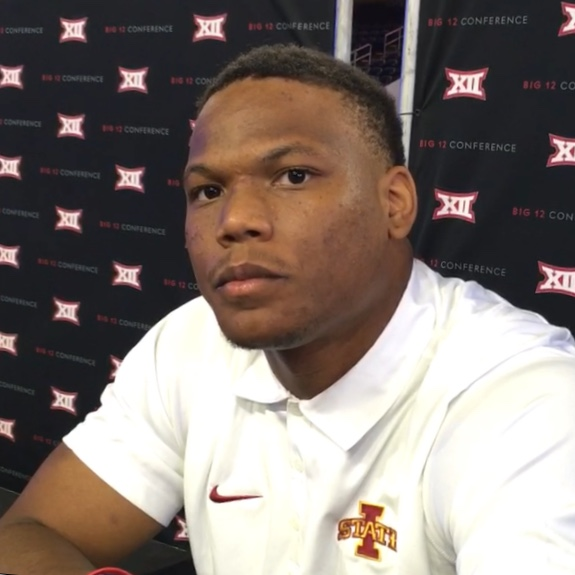
- Montgomery with Iowa State in 2018

No. 32 – Houston Texans
- Position: Running back
- Roster status: Active

Personal information
- Born: June 7, 1997 (age 29); Cincinnati, Ohio, U.S.
- Listed height: 5 ft 10 in (1.78 m)
- Listed weight: 230 lb (104 kg)

Career information
- High school: Mount Healthy (Mount Healthy, Ohio)
- College: Iowa State (2016–2018)
- NFL draft: 2019: 3rd round, 73rd overall pick

Career history
- Chicago Bears (2019–2022); Detroit Lions (2023–2025); Houston Texans (2026–present)

Awards and highlights
- 2× Brian Piccolo Award (2019, 2022); 2× First-team All-American (2017, 2018); 2× First-team All-Big 12 (2017, 2018)

Career NFL statistics as of Week 11, 2026
- Rushing yards: 6,360
- Rushing average: 4.1
- Rushing touchdowns: 61
- Receptions: 241
- Receiving yards: 1,974
- Receiving touchdowns: 5
- Stats at Pro Football Reference

David Montgomery (born June 7, 1997), nicknamed "Knuckles", is an American professional football running back for the Houston Texans of the National Football League (NFL). He played college football for the Iowa State Cyclones and was selected by the Chicago Bears in the third round of the 2019 NFL draft.

Montgomery played his first four years as Chicago's primary running back. After signing with Detroit, he became part of an elite rushing tandem with fellow tailback Jahmyr Gibbs.

== Early life ==
Montgomery grew up in the Cincinnati, Ohio, area. He is an Eagle Scout. During high school, he was a standout prep dual threat quarterback. Over his four-year high school career, he rushed for 6,666 yards and 91 touchdowns. In 2015, he was named the Division III Ohio Player of the Year as well as the Southwest District Offensive Player of the Year. His senior season rushing total of 2,707 was good enough for the 21st best single season performance in Ohio high school history. He posted seven 200-yard games and three 300-yard games, including one 373 yard performance.

Despite a record-breaking high school career, Montgomery was lightly recruited to continue his football career in college. He was recruited by Miami (OH), Ball State, Buffalo, and Iowa State. He eventually committed to the Cyclones.

College recruiting
Name	Hometown	School	Height	Weight	Commit date
David Montgomery; RB	Cincinnati, Ohio	Mount Healthy	5 ft 10 in (1.78 m)	210 lb (95 kg)	Mar 2, 2016
David Montgomery; RB	Recruit ratings: Scout: Rivals: 247Sports: (NR)				
Overall recruit ranking: 247Sports: 1,203, 55 (OH), 74 (RB)
Note: In many cases, Scout, Rivals, 247Sports, On3, and ESPN may conflict in their listings of height and weight.; In these cases, the average was taken. ESPN grades are on a 100-point scale.; Sources: "2016 Iowa State Football Commitment List". Rivals.; "2016 Iowa State Football Commits". Scout.; "ESPN". ESPN.; "Scout.com Team Recruiting Rankings". Scout.; "2016 Team Ranking". Rivals.com.

== College career ==
=== 2016 season ===
As a true freshman in 2016, Montgomery played in all 12 games and started the final four contests. He led the team in rushing with 563 yards, averaging 5.2 yards per carry. This was good enough to be the second-best freshman performance in school history. In his second career start he rushed 169 yards on 24 carries to defeat Kansas. He was named Big 12 Conference Newcomer of the Week for that performance. He finished the season with 141 yards rushing and 45 yards receiving against West Virginia.

At the conclusion of the season Montgomery was named to the honorable mention Freshman All-American team by Campus Insiders.

=== 2017 season ===
Montgomery's breakout season was in 2017. He led the Cyclones in rushing yards and yards from scrimmage with 1,095 and 1,383 respectively. He finished second in the Big 12 in rushing yards and touchdowns behind only Justice Hill. Montgomery led the nation in forced missed tackles with 104, breaking the previous record of 89 set by Dalvin Cook. Against Iowa he ran for 113 yards, rushed for a touchdown, and had 53 yards on receptions. In an upset win at #3 Oklahoma, Montgomery ran for 55 yards and a touchdown and caught 7 passes for 89 yards. He had a career day against Texas Tech rushing for 164 yards on 28 attempts, averaging 5.9 yards per play. Montgomery had a third straight 100 yard performance against West Virginia, Oklahoma State, and Baylor with 115, 105, and 144 yards respectively including three touchdowns against the Cowboys.

Montgomery received multiple accolades at the end of the regular season. He was named a first-team All-American by Pro Football Focus as well as consensus first-team All-Big 12.

=== 2018 season ===
Montgomery started the season slow, but had a string of four straight 100-yard games with five touchdowns from mid-September to mid-October, and ended the season with another string of three straight 100-yard games with six touchdowns, including 179 yards from scrimmage in the 2018 Alamo Bowl loss to Washington State. Montgomery finished the 2018 season with 1,216 rushing yards (second in the Big 12 to Alex Barnes) and 13 rushing touchdowns (second to Sam Ehlinger).

== Professional career ==
=== Pre-draft ===
On January 7, 2019, Montgomery announced that he would forgo his final season of eligibility and declare for the 2019 NFL draft. ESPN2 dubbed Montgomery the "Frankenstein" of running backs for possessing similar physical traits of different NFL running backs, including the footwork of Saquon Barkley, the field vision of Le'Veon Bell, the strength of Ezekiel Elliott and the athleticism of Sony Michel.

Pre-draft measurables
Height	Weight	Arm length	Hand span	Wingspan	40-yard dash	10-yard split	20-yard split	20-yard shuttle	Three-cone drill	Vertical jump	Broad jump	Bench press
5 ft 10 1/8 in (1.78 m)	222 lb (101 kg)	31 3/8 in (0.80 m)	9 1/4 in (0.23 m)	6 ft 5 3/8 in (1.97 m)	4.58 s	1.63 s	2.69 s	4.23 s	7.12 s	33.5 in (0.85 m)	10 ft 1 in (3.07 m)	15 reps
All values from NFL Combine/Pro Day

=== Chicago Bears ===
==== 2019 season ====
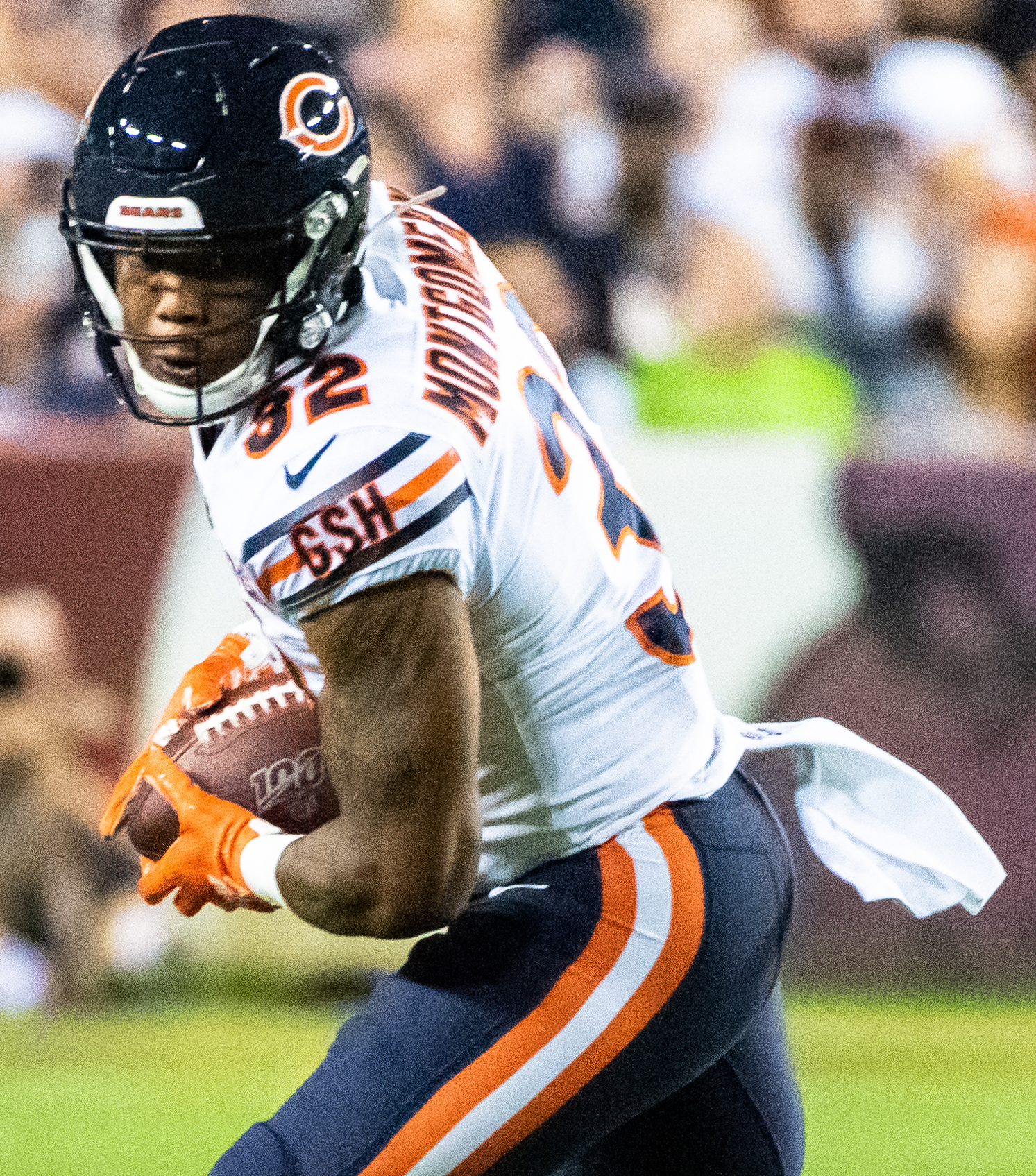
Montgomery with the Chicago Bears in 2019

The Chicago Bears drafted Montgomery in the third round with the 73rd overall pick in the draft. Montgomery signed a four-year rookie contract with the team on June 14.

Montgomery made his NFL debut with the Bears in Week 1 against the Green Bay Packers. In that game, Montgomery rushed for 18 yards on six attempts and caught one pass for 27 yards as the Bears lost 10–3. In Week 2 against the Denver Broncos, Montgomery rushed 18 times for 62 yards and his first career NFL touchdown as the Bears won 16–14. After 11 carries for 25 yards in Week 6 and two rushes for six yards and a fumble in Week 7 against the New Orleans Saints, Montgomery responded in Week 8 against the Los Angeles Chargers with 27 rushes for an NFL-second best 135 yards and a touchdown in the 17–16 loss. In Week 9 against the Philadelphia Eagles, Montgomery rushed 14 times for 40 yards and two touchdowns in the 22–14 loss. This was Montgomery's first game with multiple rushing touchdowns of his career. In Week 17 against the Minnesota Vikings, Montgomery rushed 23 times for 113 yards and a touchdown during the 21–19 win. Overall, Montgomery finished his rookie season with 889 rushing yards and six rushing touchdowns to go along with 25 receptions for 185 receiving yards and one receiving touchdown.

==== 2020 season ====
Montgomery remained the team's featured running back heading into the 2020 season. Before the regular season began, head coach Matt Nagy emphasized the offense would prioritize establishing a run game.

He opened the season with 64 rushing yards on 13 attempts en route to a 27–23 comeback win against the Detroit Lions. In Week 2 against the New York Giants, Montgomery rushed 16 times for 82 yards and caught three passes for 45 yards and his first receiving touchdown of the season during the 17–13 win.

Montgomery suffered a concussion during the Bears' Week 9 loss to the Tennessee Titans. He subsequently missed the team's Week 10 contest while recovering. The Bears rushing attack ranked last in the NFL with 82.3 yards-per-game at this point in the season. Nagy handed over play-calling responsibilities to offensive coordinator Bill Lazor. Montgomery returned for the Bears' Week 12 match-up against the Packers on Sunday Night Football, where he totaled 143 yards from scrimmage and recorded a receiving touchdown in a 41–25 loss. In his second game back from the concussion, Montgomery rushed for 72 yards with two rushing touchdowns during a 34–30 loss against the Detroit Lions.

In Week 14 against the Houston Texans, he amassed 113 rushing yards, including an 80-yard touchdown run on the first play of the Bears' opening offensive possession. The score was the fourth-longest run in Bears history and the team's first opening-play touchdown since 1995. Montgomery finished the game with 155 yards from scrimmage in a 36–7 victory over the Texans. During the Bears' 33–27 Week 15 victory over the Vikings, Montgomery rushed for a career-high 146 yards with two touchdowns on 32 carries. The following week against the Jacksonville Jaguars, he ran for 95 yards and a touchdown during the 41–17 win as he surpassed 1,000 rushing yards for the season, becoming the first Bears running back to do so since Jordan Howard in 2017. In Week 17 against the Green Bay Packers, Montgomery recorded 132 yards from scrimmage and a rushing touchdown during the 35–16 loss.

Montgomery finished the 2020 regular season with 247 rushes for 1,070 yards and eight touchdowns. His 1,070 rushing yards ranked fifth in the NFL. He also caught 54 passes for 438 yards and two touchdowns.

==== 2021 season ====
Montgomery recorded 309 rushing yards on 69 carries with three rushing touchdowns through first four games of the 2021 NFL season. He suffered a knee sprain in Week 4 against the Detroit Lions. and was placed on injured reserve on October 9, 2021, and was expected to miss 4–5 weeks. He had the fifth most rushing yards in the league until his injury. He was activated on November 8 for the team's Week 9 game. In Week 17, against the Giants, he had two rushing touchdowns in the 29–3 victory. He finished the 2021 season with 225 carries for 849 rushing yards and seven rushing touchdowns to go along with 42 receptions for 301 receiving yards. He was ranked 98th by his fellow players on the NFL Top 100 Players of 2022.

==== 2022 season ====
In Week 2, against the Packers, Montgomery had 15 carries for 122 rushing yards in the 27–10 loss. In week 10 against the Atlanta Falcons, he had 121 combined yards (67 rushing, 54 receiving), and one rushing touchdown the 27–24 loss. He finished the 2022 season with 201 carries for 801 rushing yards and five rushing touchdowns to go along with 34 receptions for 316 receiving yards and one receiving touchdown.

=== Detroit Lions ===
==== 2023 season ====
On March 16, 2023, Montgomery signed a three-year, $18 million contract with the Lions. He started as the RB1 at the start of the season before a rib injury in week 6. In a Week 4 victory over the Packers, he had 32 carries for 121 yards and three touchdowns. He then came back two weeks later sharing the backfield with rookie Jahmyr Gibbs. This duo would become one of the most successful duos in the NFL as they became the first pair of players in NFL history to combine for 1,000 yards from scrimmage and 10 touchdowns each. He finished the season with 219 carries for 1,015 rushing yards and 13 rushing touchdowns to go with 16 receptions for 117 receiving yards in 14 games and starts. He scored a touchdown in 11 different games. Montgomery and the Lions would go to the NFC Championship where they lost to the 49ers 34–31. Montgomery had 113 scrimmage yards and a rushing touchdown in the loss.

==== 2024 season ====
In Week 4 against the Seattle Seahawks, Montgomery achieved his 7th straight game with a rushing touchdown, tying Billy Sims' record for the most consecutive games with a rushing touchdown in Lions franchise history. On October 12, with two years left on his current contract, Montgomery signed a two-year extension worth $18.25 million with $10.5 million in new guaranteed money that will keep him in Detroit through the 2027 season. In Week 15's matchup against the Buffalo Bills, Montgomery suffered a medial collateral ligament injury, which was initially believed to require a season-ending surgery. However, Montgomery sought additional medical opinions and returned for the divisional round of the playoffs. Montgomery totaled 775 rushing yards and 12 touchdowns on 185 carries and 341 receiving yards on 36 catches in 14 games.

==== 2025 season ====
In Week 3 of the 2025 season against the Ravens, Montgomery had 12 carries for 151 yards and two touchdowns in the 38–30 win. He finished the 2025 season with 158 carries for 716 rushing yards and eight rushing touchdowns to go with 24 receptions for 192 receiving yards.

=== Houston Texans ===
On March 11, 2026, the Lions traded Montgomery to the Houston Texans in exchange for offensive lineman Juice Scruggs, a 2026 fourth-round pick, and a 2027 seventh-round pick. Montgomery made his Texans debut in the team's season–opening loss to the Buffalo Bills, tallying 79 scrimmage yards and three total touchdowns.

== Player profile ==
=== Nickname ===
In Montgomery's first season with the Lions, he teamed up with fellow running back Jahmyr Gibbs to form a tandem Lions head coach Dan Campbell described as a "two-headed monster." In 2024, the pair were given the nicknames "Sonic" and "Knuckles", inspired by characters from the Sonic the Hedgehog video game series, with Gibbs dubbed "Sonic" for his speed and Montgomery as "Knuckles" for his strength.

== Career statistics ==
Legend
**Bold**	Career high

=== NFL ===
==== Regular season ====
Year	Team	Games		Rushing					Receiving					Fumbles	
Year	Team	GP	GS	Att	Yds	Avg	Lng	TD	Rec	Yds	Avg	Lng	TD	Fum	Lost
2019	CHI	16	8	242	889	3.7	55	6	25	185	7.4	30	1	**2**	**2**
2020	CHI	15	14	**247**	**1,070**	4.3	**80**	8	**54**	**438**	8.1	28	**2**	1	1
2021	CHI	13	13	225	849	3.8	41	7	42	301	7.2	16	0	1	1
2022	CHI	16	16	201	801	4.0	28	5	34	316	9.3	32	1	**2**	**2**
2023	DET	14	14	219	1,015	**4.6**	75	**13**	16	117	7.3	19	0	**2**	1
2024	DET	14	14	185	775	4.2	21	12	36	341	**9.5**	**40**	0	**2**	1
2025	DET	17	0	158	716	4.5	72	8	24	192	8.0	23	0	**2**	0
2026	HOU	6	6	78	245	3.1	18	2	10	84	8.4	19	1	0	0
Career		111	85	1,555	6,360	4.1	80	61	241	1,974	8.2	40	5	12	8

==== Postseason ====
Year	Team	Games		Rushing					Receiving					Fumbles	
Year	Team	GP	GS	Att	Yds	Avg	Lng	TD	Rec	Yds	Avg	Lng	TD	Fum	Lost
2020	CHI	1	1	12	31	2.6	6	0	0	0	0.0	0	0	0	0
2023	DET	3	3	**39**	**183**	**4.7**	**16**	**2**	**6**	**45**	**7.5**	**14**	0	0	0
2024	DET	1	1	7	28	4.0	11	0	0	0	0.0	0	0	0	0
Career		5	5	58	242	4.2	16	2	6	45	7.5	14	0	0	0

=== College ===
Season	Team	Games		Rushing				Receiving			
Season	Team	GP	GS	Att	Yds	Avg	TD	Rec	Yds	Avg	TD
2016	Iowa State	12	4	109	563	**5.2**	2	13	129	**9.9**	0
2017	Iowa State	13	13	**258**	1,147	4.4	11	**36**	**296**	8.2	0
2018	Iowa State	12	11	257	**1,216**	4.7	**13**	22	157	7.1	0
Total		37	28	624	2,926	4.7	26	71	582	8.4	0

== Personal life ==
Montgomery had a difficult childhood. He does not know his father, and his mother moved the family numerous times around Cincinnati due to economic hardship. He remembers using the oven for heat, and boiling water collected from gas stations in the bath tub when either was disconnected. He has a brother who was incarcerated for drug trafficking and murder. After scoring a touchdown, Montgomery frequently holds up a "V"-sign in memory of a high school teammate and role model who was murdered during a home invasion.

During high school, he achieved the rank of Eagle Scout in the Boy Scouts of America as part of Troop 772 in Cincinnati, Ohio. He is currently an official Scouting America ambassador.

While he was with Iowa State, Montgomery was chosen as a semi-finalist for the Jason Witten Collegiate Man of the Year Award for his efforts in befriending Hunter Erb, a 6-year-old who was born with multiple congenital heart defects, and orchestrating a team visit to Marshalltown, Iowa, to help clean up after a tornado.

Montgomery began following a vegan diet during the 2020 season. After the Lions' Thanksgiving win in 2024, he drew media attention for eating a carrot while his teammates ate CBS' celebratory turkey.

Montgomery and his girlfriend had their first child, a boy, delivered on January 13, 2023.

On October 7, 2025, Montgomery was awarded the North Star Award, which is the highest award given to a person not currently enrolled in scouting for his service to Scouting. The event was held in Auburn Hills, Michigan, and was awarded by Michigan Crossroads Council chief development officer Denver Laabs.
