= 2018 Iowa State Cyclones football team =

American college football season

2018 Iowa State Cyclones football

Alamo Bowl, L 26–28 vs. Washington State
- Conference: Big 12 Conference
- Record: 8–5 (6–3 Big 12)
- Head coach: Matt Campbell (3rd season)
- Offensive scheme: Pro spread
- Defensive coordinator: Jon Heacock (3rd season)
- Base defense: 3-high safety
- Home stadium: Jack Trice Stadium

Uniform
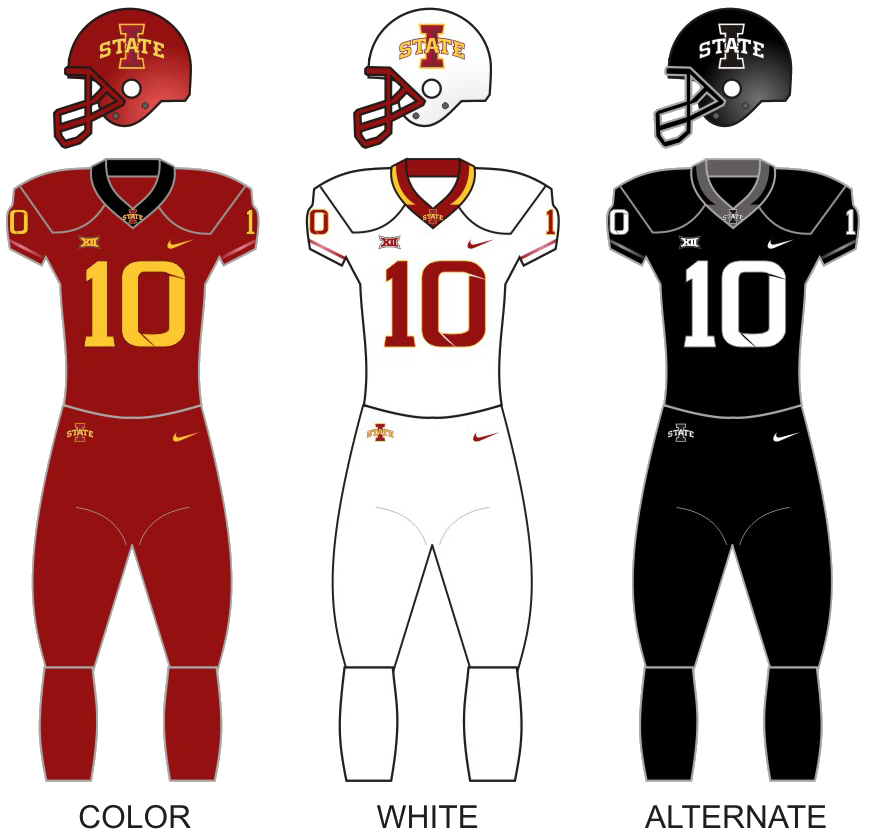

2018 Big 12 Conference football standings
	Conf.			Overall
Team	W		L	W		L
No. 4 Oklahoma y$^	8	–	1	12	–	2
No. 9 Texas y	7	–	2	10	–	4
Iowa State	6	–	3	8	–	5
No. 20 West Virginia	6	–	3	8	–	4
TCU	4	–	5	7	–	6
Baylor	4	–	5	7	–	6
Oklahoma State	3	–	6	7	–	6
Kansas State	3	–	6	5	–	7
Texas Tech	3	–	6	5	–	7
Kansas	1	–	8	3	–	9
Championship: Oklahoma 39, Texas 27
^ – College Football Playoff participant; $ – Conference champion; y – Championship game participant; Rankings from AP Poll

The 2018 Iowa State Cyclones football team represented Iowa State University as a member of Big 12 Conference during the 2018 NCAA Division I FBS football season. Led by third-year head coach Matt Campbell, the Cyclones compiled an overall record of 8–5 with a mark of 6–3 in conference play, placing third in the Big 12. Iowa State was invited to the Alamo Bowl, where the Cyclones lost to Washington State. The team played home games at Jack Trice Stadium in Ames, Iowa.

The six conference wins were the most in a season in program history

== Schedule ==
Iowa State announced their 2018 football schedule on October 26, 2017. The schedule consisted of seven home games and five away games in the regular season.

Originally, Iowa State planned to play South Dakota State on September 1 to open the season, however, the game was canceled shortly after kickoff due to bad weather. Iowa State was to host Incarnate Word on December 1, but Incarnate Word was not able to play after qualifying for the NCAA Division I Football Championship playoffs. Incarnate Word was replaced with Drake.

Date	Time	Opponent	Rank	Site	TV	Result	Attendance
September 8	4:00 p.m.	at Iowa*		Kinnick Stadium; Iowa City, IA (rivalry)	FOX	L 3–13	69,250
September 15	11:00 a.m.	No. 5 Oklahoma		Jack Trice Stadium; Ames, IA	ABC	L 27–37	58,479
September 22	11:00 a.m.	Akron*		Jack Trice Stadium; Ames, IA	FSN	W 26–13	54,028
September 29	6:00 p.m.	at TCU		Amon G. Carter Stadium; Fort Worth, TX	ESPNU	L 14–17	42,664
October 6	2:30 p.m.	at No. 25 Oklahoma State		Boone Pickens Stadium; Stillwater, OK	ESPN2	W 48–42	52,995
October 13	6:00 p.m.	No. 6 West Virginia		Jack Trice Stadium; Ames, IA	FS1	W 30–14	56,629
October 27	11:00 a.m.	Texas Tech^{†}		Jack Trice Stadium; Ames, IA	ESPN2	W 40–31	57,908
November 3	11:00 a.m.	at Kansas	No. 24	David Booth Kansas Memorial Stadium; Lawrence, KS	FSN	W 27–3	15,543
November 10	2:30 p.m.	Baylor	No. 22	Jack Trice Stadium; Ames, IA	FS1	W 28–14	53,860
November 17	7:00 p.m.	at No. 15 Texas	No. 16	Darrell K Royal Stadium; Austin, TX	LHN	L 10–24	102,498
November 24	6:00 p.m.	Kansas State	No. 25	Jack Trice Stadium; Ames, IA (rivalry)	FS1	W 42–38	54,430
December 1 (Note: The game between Iowa State and South Dakota State, originally scheduled for September 1, was canceled due to inclement weather. On September 12, Iowa State announced they would Incarnate Word from the Southland Conference on December 1. The game replaced the Cyclones' originally scheduled season opener against South Dakota State. On November 20, Iowa State announced that Drake would take the place of Incarnate Word for the December 1 game due to Incarnate Word's qualification for the NCAA Division I Football Championship playoffs.)	11:00 a.m.	Drake*	No. 23	Jack Trice Stadium; Ames, IA	Cyclones.tv	W 27–24	56,738
December 28	8:00 p.m.	vs. No. 13 Washington State*	No. 24	Alamodome; San Antonio, TX (Alamo Bowl)	ESPN	L 26–28	60,675
*Non-conference game; ^{†}Homecoming; Rankings from AP Poll and CFP Rankings after October 30 released prior to game; All times are in Central time

== Rankings ==
Ranking movements Legend: ██ Increase in ranking ██ Decrease in ranking — = Not ranked RV = Received votes
	Week															
Poll	Pre	1	2	3	4	5	6	7	8	9	10	11	12	13	14	Final
AP	RV	RV	RV	—	—	—	—	—	—	RV	23	18	25	24	25	RV
Coaches	RV	RV	RV	—	—	—	—	—	RV	RV	25	18	RV	RV	RV	RV
CFP	Not released									24	22	16	25	23	24	Not released

== Preseason ==
=== Departures ===
Departures
Player	Position	Games played	Class	Reason
Lou Ayeni	RB	4 seasons	Coach	Accepted job at Northwestern
Vernell Trent	DL	48	Senior	Graduated
Colin Downing	P	48	Senior	Graduated
Allen Lazard	WR	47	Senior	Graduated
Jack Spreen	LB	44	Senior	Graduated
Kamari Cotton-Moya	DB	40	Senior	Graduated
Joel Lanning	LB	36	Senior	Graduated
Trever Ryen	WR	36	Senior	Graduated
Jake Campos	OL	35	Senior	Graduated
Robby Garcia	OL	31	Senior	Graduated
J.D. Waggoner	DE	29	Senior	Graduated
Kyle Starcevich	QB	24	Senior	Graduated
Sam Harms	TE	24	Senior	Graduated
Everett Edwards	DB	24	Senior	Graduated
Marchie Murdock	WR	21	Senior	Graduated
Bryan Larson	OL	21	Senior	Graduated
Jacob Park	QB	14	Junior	Transfer
Thadd Daniels	DB	13	Senior	Graduated
Mackenro Alexander	LB	13	Senior	Graduated
Reggie Wilkerson	DB	11	Senior	Graduated
Vic Holmes	DB	3	Senior	Graduated
Shawn Curtis	OL	2	Senior	Graduated
Jacob Bolton	OL	0	Freshman	Quit

=== Award watch lists ===
Award	Player	Position	Year
Chuck Bednarik Award	Brian Peavy	CB	SR
Maxwell Award	David Montgomery	RB	JR
Davey O'Brien Award	Kyle Kempt	QB	SR
Doak Walker Award	David Montgomery	RB	JR
John Mackey Award	Chase Allen	TE	SO
Bronko Nagurski Trophy	Ray Lima	DL	JR
Outland Trophy	Ray Lima	DL	JR
Ted Hendricks Award	JaQuan Bailey	DE	JR
Johnny Unitas Golden Arm Award	Kyle Kempt	QB	SR
Manning Award	Kyle Kempt	QB	SR
Earl Campbell Tyler Rose Award	Hakeem Butler	WR	JR

=== Big 12 media poll ===
The Big 12 media poll was released on July 12, 2018, with the Cyclones predicted to finish in seventh place.

== Game summaries ==
=== Game 1: at Iowa Hawkeyes ===
Game One: Iowa State Cyclones at Iowa Hawkeyes – Game summary

Quarter	1	2	3	4	Total
Cyclones	3	0	0	0	3
Hawkeyes	0	3	3	7	13

at Kinnick Stadium, Iowa City, IA

- Date: September 8
- Game time: 4:05 p.m. CDT
- Game weather: Temperature: 69°F • Wind: 5–10 mph (8.0–16.1 km/h) • Weather: Partly Sunny
- Game attendance: 69,250
- Referee: Referee: Cooper Castleberry • Umpire: Jim Adams • Linesman: John Braun • Line judge: Kelly Deterding • Back judge: Scott Gaines • Field judge: Anth. Flemming • Side judge: Donnie Aultman
- TV announcers (FOX): Tim Brando, Spencer Tillman, and Holly Sonders

Game information

First quarter

- (6:42) ISU – Connor Assalley 23 Yd Field Goal
  Iowa State 3–0; 13 plays, 66 yards, 6:49

Second quarter

- (5:18) IOWA – Miguel Recinos 31 Yd Field Goal
  Tied 3–3; 6 plays, 15 yards, 2:16

Third quarter

- (6:34) IOWA – Miguel Recinos 48 Yd Field Goal
  Iowa 6–3; 6 plays, 40 yards, 2:32

Fourth quarter

- (4:47) IOWA – Mekhi Sargent 2 Yd Run, Miguel Recinos kick
  Iowa 13–3; 13 plays, 83 yards, 6:30

Top passers

- IOWA – Nate Stanley – 16/28, 166 yards
- ISU – Kyle Kempt – 15/21, 126 yards

Top rushers

- IOWA – Toren Young – 21 carries, 68 yards
- ISU – David Montgomery – 17 carries, 44 yards

Top receivers

- IOWA – T. J. Hockenson – 6 receptions, 33 yards
- ISU – Hakeem Butler – 3 receptions, 35 yards

Top tacklers

- IOWA – John Milani – 1 tackle
- ISU – D'Andre Payne – 7 tackles

=== Game 2: Oklahoma Sooners ===
Game Two: Oklahoma Sooners at Iowa State Cyclones – Game summary

Quarter	1	2	3	4	Total
No. 5 Sooners	10	14	10	3	37
Cyclones	0	10	14	3	27

at Jack Trice Stadium, Ames, IA

- Date: September 15
- Game time: 11:06 a.m. CDT
- Game weather: Partly Cloudy • Temperature: 83 °F (28 °C) • Wind: ESE 2 miles per hour (3.2 km/h)
- Game attendance: 58,479
- Referee: Referee: Brad Van Vark • Umpire: Michael Cooper • Linesman: George Cusman • Line judge: Frank LeBlanc • Back judge: Brian Ernest • Field judge: Jason Ledet • Side judge: Tuta Salaam
- TV announcers (ABC): Dave Pasch (Play-by-Play), Greg McElroy (analyst), Tom Luginbill (sideline)

Game information

First quarter

- (8:22) OKLA – Austin Seibert 21 Yd Field Goal
  Oklahoma 3–0;
- (3:43) OKLA – Marquise Brown 75 Yd pass from Kyler Murray, Austin Seibert kick
  Oklahoma 10–0; 1 play, 65 yards, 0:16

Second quarter

- (13:38) ISU – Connor Assalley 34 Yd Field Goal
  Oklahoma 10–3; 3 plays, 74 yards, 1:22
- (13:15) ISU – Hakeem Butler 51 Yd pass from Zeb Noland, Connor Assalley Kick
  Tied 10–10; 3 plays, 74 yards, 1:22
- (11:11) OKLA – CeeDee Lamb 5 Yd pass from Murray, Seibert kick
  Oklahoma 17–10; 3 plays, 74 yards, 1:22
- (0:05) OKLA – Myles Tease 7 Yd pass from Murray, Seibert kick
  Oklahoma 24–10; 3 plays, 74 yards, 1:22

Third quarter

- (11:48) ISU – Butler 57 Yd pass from Noland, Assalley kick
  Oklahoma 24–17; 3 plays, 74 yards, 1:22
- (9:20) OKLA – Trey Sermon 22 Yd Run, Seibert kick
  Oklahoma 31–17; 3 plays, 74 yards, 1:22
- (6:40) ISU – David Montgomery 1 Yd Run, Assalley kick
  Oklahoma 31–24; 3 plays, 74 yards, 1:22
- (3:20) OKLA – Austin Seibert 31 Yd Field Goal
  Oklahoma 34–24; 3 plays, 74 yards, 1:22

Fourth quarter

- (10:43) ISU – Connor Assalley 21 Yd Field Goal
  Oklahoma 34–27; 3 plays, 74 yards, 1:22
- (2:51) OKLA – Austin Seibert 42 Yd Field Goal
  Oklahoma 37–27; 15 plays, 75 yards, 7:29

Top passers

- OU – Kyler Murray – 21/29, 348 yards, 3 TD
- ISU – Zeb Noland – 25/36, 360 yards, 2 TD, INT

Top rushers

- OU – Kyler Murray – 15 carries, 77 yards
- ISU – David Montgomery – 21 carries, 82 yards, TD

Top receivers

- OU – Marquise Brown – 9 receptions, 191 yards, TD
- ISU – Hakeem Butler – 5 receptions, 174 yards, 2 TD

Top tacklers

- OU – Kenneth Murray – 10 tackles
- ISU – Greg Eisworth – 14 tackles

=== Game 3: Akron Zips ===
Game Three: Akron Zips at Iowa State Cyclones – Game summary

Quarter	1	2	3	4	Total
Zips	7	3	3	0	13
Cyclones	7	10	0	9	26

at Jack Trice Stadium, Ames, IA

- Date: September 22
- Referee: Referee: • Umpire: • Linesman: • Line judge: • Back judge: • Field judge: • Side judge:

Game information

First quarter

Second quarter

Third quarter

Fourth quarter

Top passers

- AK –
- ISU –

Top rushers

- AK –
- ISU –

Top receivers

- AK –
- ISU –

Top tacklers

- AK –
- ISU –

=== Game 4: at TCU Horned Frogs ===
Game Four: Iowa State Cyclones at TCU Horned Frogs – Game summary

Quarter	1	2	3	4	Total
Cyclones	0	7	0	7	14
Horned Frogs	0	7	7	3	17

at Amon G. Carter Stadium, Fort Worth, TX

- Date: September 29
- Game attendance: 42,664
- Referee: Referee: • Umpire: • Linesman: • Line judge: • Back judge: • Field judge: • Side judge:

Game information

First quarter

Second quarter

Third quarter

Fourth quarter

Top passers

- TCU –
- ISU –

Top rushers

- TCU –
- ISU –

Top receivers

- TCU –
- ISU –

Top tacklers

- TCU –
- ISU –

=== Game 5: at Oklahoma State Cowboys ===
Game Five: Iowa State Cyclones at Oklahoma State Cowboys – Game summary

Quarter	1	2	3	4	Total
Cyclones	9	21	10	8	48
No. 25 Cowboys	7	14	7	14	42

at Boone Pickens Stadium, Stillwater, OK

- Date: October 6
- Game weather: Temperature: °F • Wind: • Weather:
- Referee: Referee: • Umpire: • Linesman: • Line judge: • Back judge: • Field judge: • Side judge:

Game information

First quarter

Second quarter

Third quarter

Fourth quarter

Top passers

- OSU –
- ISU –

Top rushers

- OSU –
- ISU –

Top receivers

- OSU –
- ISU –

Top tacklers

- OSU –
- ISU –

Iowa State's Freshman Brock Purdy replaced Zeb Noland at quarterback and passed 18-for-23 for 318 yards and produced four touchdowns. He then ran for another 84 yards and another score. The final score was a loss for the Cowboys at 48–42.

=== Game 6: West Virginia Mountaineers ===
Game Six: West Virginia Mountaineers at Iowa State Cyclones – Game summary

Quarter	1	2	3	4	Total
No. 6 Mountaineers	7	7	0	0	14
Cyclones	13	7	0	10	30

at Jack Trice Stadium, Ames, IA

- Date: October 13
- Game time: 6:00 p.m.
- Game weather: Temperature: 55 °F (13 °C) • Weather: Scattered Clouds • Wind:S 0–5 MPH
- Game attendance: 56,629
- Referee: Referee: David Alvarez • Umpire: Scott Teifer • Linesman: Andy Warner • Line judge: Darren Deckard • Back judge: Chris Alston • Field judge: Ed Vinzant • Side judge: Jim Murphy • Center Judge:
- TV announcers (FS1): Tim Brando (play-by-play), Spencer Tillman (color)

Game information

First quarter

- 6:47 WVU TD – David Sills 18-yard pass from Will Grier (Staley PAT)
- 4:24 ISU TD – Hakeem Butler 4-yard pass from Brock Purdy (Assalley PAT)
- 0:13 ISU TD – David Montgomery 2-yard run (Kick Failed)

Second quarter

- 9:21 ISU TD – Charlie Kolar 19-yard pass from Brock Purdy (Assalley PAT)
- 2:58 WVU TD – Derrek Pitts Jr. 72-yard blocked field goal return (Staley PAT)

Third quarter

No scoring plays

Fourth quarter

- 12:17 ISU TD – Deshaunte Jones 32-yard pass from Brock Purdy (Eaton Pass)
- 5:14 ISU – Team Safety

Top passers

- WVU – Will Grier: 11/15, 100 yards, 1 TD, 1 INT
- ISU – Brock Purdy: 18/25, 254 yards, 3 TD, 1 INT

Top rushers

- WVU – Kennedy McCoy: 9 rushes, 55 yards
- ISU – David Montgomery: 29 rushes, 189 yards, 1 TD

Top receivers

- WVU – Gary Jennings Jr.: 4 receptions, 38 yards
- ISU – Hakeem Butler: 6 receptions, 107 yards, 1 TD

Top tacklers

- WVU – Shea Campbell – 12 tackles
- ISU – Greg Eisworth – 8 tackles

=== Game 7: Texas Tech Red Raiders ===
Game Seven: Texas Tech Red Raiders at Iowa State Cyclones – Game summary

Quarter	1	2	3	4	Total
Red Raiders	10	7	7	7	31
Cyclones	0	14	17	9	40

at Jack Trice Stadium, Ames, IA

- Date: October 27
- Game time: 11:00 a.m.
- Game weather: Temperature: 50 °F (10 °C) • Weather: clear • Wind: SW 0-2 MPH
- Game attendance: 57,908
- Referee: Referee: Mike Defee • Umpire: Robert Richeson • Linesman: Al Green • Line judge: Derek Anderson • Back judge: Terry Jones • Field judge: Joe Blubaugh • Side judge: Lo van Pham
- TV announcers (ESPN 2): Anish Shroff, Ahmad D. Brooks, Roddy Jones

Game information

First quarter

- TTU – Thomas Leggett 0-yard blocked punt return (Clayton Hatfield kick), 11:44. Red Raiders 7–0.
- TTU – Clayton Hatfield 27-yard field goal, 1:28. Red Raiders 10–0. Drive: 8 plays, 34 yards, 2:49.

Second quarter

- ISU – David Montgomery 1-yard run (Connor Assalley kick), 13:35. Red Raiders 10–7. Drive: 9 plays, 75 yards, 2:53.
- ISU – Charlie Kolar 9-yard pass from Brock Purdy (Connor Assalley kick), 4:35. Cyclones 14–10. Drive: 7 plays, 89 yards, 3:12.
- TTU – Alan Bowman 1-yard run (Clayton Hatfield kick), 0:10. Red Raiders 17–14. Drive: 12 plays, 85 yards, 4:25.

Third quarter

- ISU – Connor Assalley 27-yard field goal, 12:26. Tied 17–17. Drive: 6 plays, 33 yards, 2:34.
- ISU – Marcel Spears Jr. 41-yard interception return (Connor Assalley kick), 11:03. Cyclones 24–17.
- TTU – Antoine Wesley 31-yard pass from Alan Bowman (Clayton Hatfield kick), 8:21. Tied 24–24. Drive: 8 plays, 65 yards, 2:42.
- ISU – David Montgomery 1-yard run (Connor Assalley kick), 4:41. Cyclones 31–24. Drive: 7 plays, 75 yards, 3:40.

Fourth quarter

- TTU – Dakota Allen 0-yard fumble recovery (Clayton Hatfield kick), 12:50. Tied 31–31.
- ISU – Alan Bowman penalty in end zone, 4:39. Cyclones 33–31.
- ISU – Hakeem Butler 48-yard pass from Brock Purdy (Connor Assalley kick), 2:25. Cyclones 40–31. Drive: 5 plays, 75 yards, 2:14.

Top passers

- TTU – Alan Bowman – 32/56, 323 yards, TD, 3 INT
- ISU – Brock Purdy – 13/27, 250 yards, 2 TD

Top rushers

- TTU – Da'Leon Ward – 10 carries, 16 yards
- ISU – David Montgomery – 32 carries, 125, yards, 2 TD

Top receivers

- TTU – Antoine Wesley – 8 receptions, 119 yards, TD
- ISU – Hakeem Butler – 4 receptions, 148 yards, TD

Top tacklers

- TTU – Dakota Allen – 16 tackles
- ISU – Brian Peavy – 9 tackles

=== Game 8: at Kansas Jayhawks ===
Game Eight: Iowa State Cyclones at Kansas Jayhawks – Game summary

Quarter	1	2	3	4	Total
Cyclones	14	6	7	0	27
Jayhawks	0	3	0	0	3

at David Booth Kansas Memorial Stadium, Lawrence, KS

- Date: November 3
- Game time: 11:00 a.m.
- Referee: Referee: • Umpire: • Linesman: • Line judge: • Back judge: • Field judge: • Side judge: • Center judge:
- TV: FSN

Game information

First quarter

Second quarter

Third quarter

Fourth quarter

Top passers

- KU –
- ISU –

Top rushers

- KU –
- ISU –

Top receivers

- KU –
- ISU –

Top tacklers

- KU –
- ISU –

=== Game 9: Baylor Bears ===
Game Nine: Baylor Bears at Iowa State Cyclones – Game summary

Quarter	1	2	3	4	Total
Bears	0	0	7	7	14
No. 23 Cyclones	7	10	11	0	28

at Jack Trice Stadium, Ames, IA

- Date: November 10
- Game time: 2:30 p.m.
- Referee: Referee: • Umpire: • Linesman: • Line judge: • Back judge: • Field judge: • Side judge:
- TV: FS1

Game information

First quarter

Second quarter

Third quarter

Fourth quarter

Top passers

- BU –
- ISU –

Top rushers

- BU –
- ISU –

Top receivers

- BU –
- ISU –

Top tacklers

- BU –
- ISU –

At the beginning of the second half, Baylor's Chris Miller got a flag for a late hit against Iowa State running back David Montgomery, pushing him into a Gatorade cooler, escalating tensions. Later, Baylor linebacker Greg Roberts threw a punch at Montgomery and he responded with another punch. Both were ejected from the second half of the game and Montgomery was ejected from the first half of the Texas game the following week.

=== Game 10: at Texas Longhorns ===
Game Ten: Iowa State Cyclones at Texas Longhorns – Game summary

Quarter	1	2	3	4	Total
No. 18 Cyclones	3	0	0	7	10
No. 13 Longhorns	7	10	7	0	24

at Darrell K Royal Stadium, Austin, TX

- Date: November 17
- Game time: 7:00 pm
- Referee: Referee: • Umpire: • Linesman: • Line judge: • Back judge: • Field judge: • Side judge: • Center Judge:
- TV: LHN

Game information

First quarter

Second quarter

Third quarter

Fourth quarter

Top passers

- UT –
- ISU –

Top rushers

- UT –
- ISU –

Top receivers

- UT –
- ISU –

Top tacklers

- UT –
- ISU –

=== Game 11: Kansas State Wildcats ===
Game Eleven: Kansas State Wildcats at Iowa State Cyclones – Game summary

Quarter	1	2	3	4	Total
Wildcats	0	21	10	7	38
No. 25 Cyclones	7	7	7	21	42

at Jack Trice Stadium, Ames, IA

- Date: November 24
- Game time: 6:30 p.m.
- Referee: Referee: • Umpire: • Linesman: • Line judge: • Back judge: • Field judge: • Side judge:
- TV: FS1

Game information

First quarter

Second quarter

Third quarter

Fourth quarter

Top passers

- KSU –
- ISU –

Top rushers

- KSU –
- ISU –

Top receivers

- KSU –
- ISU –

Top tacklers

- KSU –
- ISU –

After a slow start, Kansas State held a solid lead for most of the game. Kansas State had racked up a 17-point lead with only 12 minutes remaining in the game. From there, Iowa State's Mike Rose grabbed a loose ball for a touchdown and the Cyclones controlled the game to rally with 21 unanswered points. The final score was an Iowa State victory, 41–38. The Cyclones broke the 9 year losing streak against the Wildcats. This game was also the last game Kansas State coach Bill Snyder coached before retiring.

=== Game 12: Drake Bulldogs ===
Game Twelve: Drake Bulldogs at Iowa State Cyclones – Game summary

Quarter	1	2	3	4	Total
Bulldogs	7	7	10	0	24
No. 24 Cyclones	7	13	7	0	27

at Jack Trice Stadium, Ames, IA

- Date: December 1
- Game time: 11:00 a.m.
- Referee: Referee: • Umpire: • Linesman: • Line judge: • Back judge: • Field judge: • Side judge:
- TV: Cyclones.tv

Game information

First quarter

Second quarter

Third quarter

Fourth quarter

Top passers

- KSU –
- DU –

Top rushers

- KSU –
- DU –

Top receivers

- KSU –
- DU –

Top tacklers

- KSU –
- DU –

The Cyclones were scheduled to take on the Incarnate Word Cardinals as a replacement for their cancelled South Dakota State game from Week 1, however, the Cardinals qualified for the NCAA Division I Football Championship playoffs, requiring a different opponent.

=== Game 13: Washington State Cougars (Alamo Bowl) ===
Game Twelve: Iowa State Cyclones at Washington State Cougars (Alamo Bowl) – Game summary

Quarter	1	2	3	4	Total
No. 24 Cyclones	0	10	10	6	26
No. 13 Cougars	7	14	0	7	28

at Alamodome, San Antonio, TX

- Date: December 28
- Game time: 8:00 p.m.
- Game weather: 72 °F (22 °C), Indoors
- Game attendance: 60,675
- Referee: Referee: John O'Neil • Umpire: Jim Shaw • Linesman: Bruce Keeling • Line judge: Patrick Holt • Back judge: Mike Brown • Field judge: Steve Thielen • Side judge: John Roggerman
- TV announcers (ESPN): Dave Pasch, Greg McElroy and Tom Luginbill

Game information

First quarter

- WSU – Renard Bell 22 yard pass from Gardner Minshew (Blake Mazza kick), 6:55 (WSU 7–0)

Second quarter

- WSU – Gardner Minshew 7 yard run (Blake Mazza kick), 6:08 (WSU 14–0)
- ISU – Brock Purdy 9 yard run (Connor Assalley kick), 4:26 (WSU 14–7)
- WSU – Dezmon Patmon 9 yard pass from Gardner Minshew (Blake Mazza kick), 1:02 (WSU 21–7)
- ISU – Connor Assalley 50 yard field goal, 0:00 (WSU 21–10)

Third quarter

- ISU – David Montgomery 8 yard run (Connor Assalley kick), 12:11 (WSU 21–17)
- ISU – Connor Assalley 23 yard field goal, 1:04 (WSU 21–20)

Fourth quarter

- WSU – Max Borghi 10 yard run (Blake Mazza kick), 10:24 (WSU 28–20)
- ISU – Brock Purdy 1 yard run (pass failed), 4:02 (WSU 28–26)

Top passers

- ISU – Brock Purdy – 18/27, 315 yards, 2 int
- WSU – Gardner Minshew – 35/49, 299 yards, 2 TD

Top rushers

- ISU – David Montgomery – 25 carries, 124 yards, TD
- WSU – Gardner Minshew – 6 carries, 16 yards, TD

Top receivers

- ISU – Hakeem Butler – 9 receptions, 192 yards
- WSU – Dezmon Patmon – 6 receptions, 76 yards, TD

Top tacklers

- ISU – Marcel Spears Jr. – 8 tackles, 0.5 sacks
- WSU – Peyton Pelluer – 10 tackles, sack

== Personnel ==
=== Coaching staff ===
Coaching staff
Name	Position	Alma mater	Seasons at ISU
Matt Campbell	Head coach	Mount Union, 2002	3rd
Jon Heacock	Defensive coordinator, Safeties	Muskingum, 1983	3rd
Brian Gasser	Wide Receivers, Special Teams	Ohio Northern, 2006	3rd
Nathan Scheelhaase	Running Backs	Illinois, 2013	1st
Alex Golesh	Tight Ends, Recruiting Coordinator	Ohio State, 2006	3rd
D.K. McDonald	Cornerbacks	Edinboro, 2001	3rd
Eli Rasheed	Defensive Line	Indiana, 1996	3rd
Tyson Veidt	Assistant head coach, Linebackers	Muskingum, 1996	3rd
Joel Gordon	Quarterbacks	Shepherd, 2003	3rd
Jeff Myers	Offensive Line	Toledo, 2012	3rd
Rudy Wade	Strength and Conditioning	Ball State, 2001	3rd

=== Roster ===
2018 Iowa State Cyclones Football
Quarterback: 17 Kyle Kempt – (redshirt) senior (6'5", 220); 15 Brock Purdy – freshman (6'1", 202); 6 Re-Al Mitchell – freshman (6'0", 192); 10 Blake Clark – freshman (6'2", 178); Running back: 2 Mike Warren – (redshirt) senior (6'0", 215); 3 Kene Nwangwu – (redshirt) sophomore (6'1", 206); 24 Johnnie Lang – (redshirt) freshman (5'8", 196); 25 Sheldon Croney Jr. – (redshirt) junior (5'11", 206); 29 Rory Walling – (redshirt) freshman (5'11", 203); 27 Jared Rus – freshman (6'2", 208); 32 David Montgomery – junior (5'11", 216); Wide receiver: 8 Deshaunte Jones – sophomore (5'10", 185); 9 Joseph Scates – freshman (6'2", 181); 13 Josh Johnson – (redshirt) freshman (5'11", 183); 14 Tarique Milton – (redshirt) freshman (5'10", 176); 16 Carson Schleker – freshman (5'9", 178); 18 Hakeem Butler – (redshirt) junior (6'6", 225); 19 Beau Coberley – freshman (5'11", 170); 21 Tayvonn Kyle – freshman (5'11", 160); 23 Matthew Eaton – (redshirt) senior (6'4", 211); 26 Parker Rickert – (redshirt) freshman (5'11", 195); 37 Daric Whipple – (redshirt) sophomore (5'10", 192); 80 Carson Epps – senior (6'1", 205); 81 Sean Shaw Jr. – freshman (6'6", 200); 82 Landen Akers – (redshirt) sophomore (6'0", 192); 83 Jalen Martin – (redshirt) sophomore (6'3", 211); 85 Tory Spears – freshman (6'3", 183); 87 Zach Shipman – freshman (6'4", 174); Placekicker: 38 Peyton Paddock – (redshirt) junior (6'0", 212); 41 Chris Francis – (redshirt) senior (6'0", 182); 90 Brayden Narveson – freshman (6'1", 195); 96 Connor Assalley – (redshirt) sophomore (6'0", 191)	Tight end: 11 Chase Allen – (redshirt) sophomore (6'7", 240); 39 Zach Silbermann – (redshirt) sophomore (6'0", 226); 40 Morgan Bartman – freshman (6'4", 242); 47 Sam Seonbuchner – (redshirt) senior (6'3", 244); 86 Cole Anderson – (redshirt) senior (6'4", 250); 88 Charlie Kolar – (redshirt) freshman (6'6", 250); 89 Dylan Soehner – (redshirt) sophomore (6'7", 271); Offensive lineman: 51 Julian Good-Jones – (redshirt) junior (6'5", 296); 52 Trevor Downing – freshman (6'4", 304); 53 Gerry Alt – (redshirt) freshman (6'2", 290); 54 Josh Mueller – (redshirt) sophomore (6'6", 309); 56 Bobby Denaro – (redshirt) freshman (6'3", 310); 57 Colin Newell – (redshirt) freshman (6'4", 292); 62 Noah Juergensen – (redshirt) sophomore (6'4", 294); 63 Collin Olson – (redshirt) junior (6'1", 279); 64 Derek Schweiger – (redshirt) freshman (6'3", 289); 65 Matt Seres – freshman (6'0", 295); 66 Josh Knipfel – junior (6'5", 309); 68 Zach Ross – freshman (6'2", 301); 70 Oge Udeogu – (redshirt) senior (6'3", 310); 71 Alex Kleinow – (redshirt) freshman (6'6", 301); 73 Will Windham – (redshirt) senior (6'3", 315); 74 Bryce Meeker – (redshirt) junior (6'5", 309); 75 Sean Foster – (redshirt) sophomore (6'8", 312); 76 Jeff Nogaj – (redshirt) freshman (6'4", 308); 77 Robert Hudson – (redshirt) freshman (6'6", 320); 78 Joey Ramos – freshman (6'5", 310); Defensive lineman: 3 JaQuan Bailey – junior (6'2", 251); 18 Cordarrius Bailey – (redshirt) freshman (6'3", 224); 31 Conner Greene – (redshirt) junior (6'1", 237); 45 Carson Lensing – (redshirt) sophomore (6'4", 267); 48 Kamilo Tongamoa – (redshirt) senior (6'5", 309); 50 Eyioma Uwazurike – (redshirt) sophomore (6'6", 283); 52 Dan Sichterman – (redshirt) freshman (6'3", 263); 54 Austin Svoboda – freshman (6'3", 220); 55 Zach Petersen – freshman (6'4", 236); 58 Spencer Benton – (redshirt) senior (6'2", 256); 76 Ray Lima – (redshirt) junior (6'3", 302); 80 Vince Horras – (redshirt) senior (6'6", 241); 89 Matt Leo – (redshirt) junior (6'7", 276); 90 Joshua Bailey – (redshirt) sophomore (6'2", 284); 92 Jamahl Johnson – junior (6'0", 295); 93 Isaiah Lee – freshman (6'0", 284); 95 Tucker Robertson – (redshirt) freshman (6'3", 280); 96 Ben Latusek – (redshirt) freshman (6'3", 262); 97 Angel Dominguez – (redshirt) freshman (6'4", 280); 99 Will McDonald IV – freshman (6'4", 220)	Linebacker: 2 Willie Harvey Jr. – (redshirt) senior (6'0", 224); 9 Reggan Northrup – (redshirt) senior (6'1", 208); 20 Aaron Austin – (redshirt) sophomore (5'11", 205); 23 Mike Rose – freshman (6'3", 228); 34 O'Rien Vance – (redshirt) freshman (6'1", 235); 35 Jake Hummel – sophomore (6'3", 228); 36 Chandler Pulvermacher – freshman (6'3", 204); 38 Gerry Vaughn – freshman (5'11", 211); 40 Jared Gescheidler – (redshirt) junior (6'1", 233); 41 Ryan Reighard – freshman (5'11", 202); 42 Marcel Spears Jr. – (redshirt) junior (6'1", 215); 43 Tymar Sutton – (redshirt) sophomore (5'10", 222); 44 Bobby McMillen III – (redshirt) junior (6'2", 230); 47 Kendell Jackson – freshman (5'11", 212); 48 Jason Bowman – (redshirt) senior (6'3", 219); 49 Caleb Young – freshman (6'0", 205); 53 Derek Greiner – (redshirt) freshman (5'11", 229); 56 Kendrick Harris – freshman (6'1", 215); Defensive back: 1 D'Andre Payne – (redshirt) senior (5'10", 188); 4 Arnold Azunna – (redshirt) sophomore (6'0", 192); 6 De'Monte Ruth – (redshirt) senior (5'10", 175); 10 Brian Peavy – (redshirt) senior (5'9", 194); 11 Lawrence White – (redshirt) sophomore (6'0", 191); 12 Greg Eisworth – (redshirt) sophomore (6'0", 198); 13 Jaeveyon Morton – freshman (5'9", 180); 15 Dallas Taylor-Cortez – freshman (6'2", 160); 16 Keontae Jones – sophomore (6'0", 173); 16 Shane Starcevich – freshman (6'0", 170); 17 Richard Bowens III – (redshirt) freshman (6'1", 194); 21 Jatairis Grant – (redshirt) sophomore (6'0", 198); 22 O.J. Tucker – (redshirt) freshman (5'11", 214); 25 Datrone Young – (redshirt) freshman (5'9", 171); 26 Anthony Johnson Jr. – freshman (6'0", 173); 27 Amechie Walker – (redshirt) junior (5'10", 177); 31 Zach Jones – freshman (5'10", 175); 33 Braxton Lewis – (redshirt) junior (5'11", 186); 39 Miles Rupiper – freshman (6'1", 171); Long snappers: 39 Steven Wirtel – junior (6'4", 227); 59 Connor Guess – freshman (5'11", 240); 60 Quinn Sonntag – senior (6'0", 221); Punter: 13 Corey Dunn – (redshirt) sophomore (6'1", 203); 98 Joe Rivera – (redshirt) sophomore (6'2", 188)
: 2017 Iowa State Cyclones Football Commits (01/27/2017)

=== 2018 recruiting class ===
College recruiting information
Name	Hometown	School	Height	Weight	Commit date
Re-al Mitchell; QB	Bellflower, CA	St. John Bosco	5 ft 11 in (1.80 m)	190 lb (86 kg)	May 1, 2017
Re-al Mitchell; QB	Recruit ratings: Scout: Rivals: 247Sports: ESPN: (79)				
Carson Schleker; WR	Allen, TX	Allen HS	5 ft 9 in (1.75 m)	180 lb (82 kg)	Jun 26, 2017
Carson Schleker; WR	Recruit ratings: Scout: Rivals: 247Sports: ESPN: (79)				
Brock Purdy; QB	Gilbert, AZ	Perry HS	6 ft 1 in (1.85 m)	197 lb (89 kg)	Feb 7, 2018
Brock Purdy; QB	Recruit ratings: Scout: 247Sports: ESPN: (78)				
Sean Shaw Jr. WR	Jones, OK	Jones HS	6 ft 6 in (1.98 m)	200 lb (91 kg)	Sep 18, 2017
Sean Shaw Jr. WR	Recruit ratings: Scout: Rivals: 247Sports: ESPN: (77)				
Zach Ross; OG	West Des Moines, IA	Dowling Catholic	6 ft 3 in (1.91 m)	300 lb (140 kg)	May 24, 2017
Zach Ross; OG	Recruit ratings: Scout: Rivals: 247Sports: ESPN: (72)				
Trevor Downing; OG	Creston, IA	Creston HS	6 ft 5 in (1.96 m)	290 lb (130 kg)	May 18, 2017
Trevor Downing; OG	Recruit ratings: Scout: Rivals: 247Sports: ESPN: (77)				
Isaiah Lee; DT	La Grange Park, IL	Nazareth Academy	6 ft 2 in (1.88 m)	280 lb (130 kg)	Jul 31, 2017
Isaiah Lee; DT	Recruit ratings: Scout: Rivals: 247Sports: ESPN:				
Will McDonald IV; WDE	Waukesha, WI	Waukesha North	6 ft 5 in (1.96 m)	215 lb (98 kg)	Feb 24, 2017
Will McDonald IV; WDE	Recruit ratings: Scout: Rivals: 247Sports: ESPN: (77)				
Mike Rose; OLB	Broadview Heights, OH	Brecksville-Broadview Heights	6 ft 4 in (1.93 m)	220 lb (100 kg)	Oct 19, 2017
Mike Rose; OLB	Recruit ratings: Scout: Rivals: 247Sports: ESPN:				
Gerry Vaughn; OLB	Tucker, GA	Tucker	6 ft 0 in (1.83 m)	210 lb (95 kg)	Jun 18, 2017
Gerry Vaughn; OLB	Recruit ratings: Scout: Rivals: 247Sports: ESPN: (72)				
Jaeveyon Morton; CB	Detroit, MI	Martin Luther King	5 ft 9 in (1.75 m)	160 lb (73 kg)	Jun 10, 2017
Jaeveyon Morton; CB	Recruit ratings: Scout: Rivals: 247Sports: ESPN: (73)				
Dallas Taylor-Cortez; CB	West Hills, CA	Chaminade	6 ft 3 in (1.91 m)	173 lb (78 kg)	Sep 26, 2017
Dallas Taylor-Cortez; CB	Recruit ratings: Scout: Rivals: 247Sports: ESPN: (75)				
Anthony Johnson Jr. CB	St. Petersburg, FL	St. Petersburg HS	6 ft 1 in (1.85 m)	165 lb (75 kg)	May 19, 2017
Anthony Johnson Jr. CB	Recruit ratings: Scout: Rivals: 247Sports: ESPN: (72)				
Greg Eisworth; S	Athens, TX	Trinity Valley CC	6 ft 0 in (1.83 m)	195 lb (88 kg)	Sep 3, 2017
Greg Eisworth; S	Recruit ratings: Scout: Rivals: 247Sports:				
Chandler Pulvermacher; S	Hartland, WI	Arrowhead	6 ft 2 in (1.88 m)	190 lb (86 kg)	Dec 1, 2017
Chandler Pulvermacher; S	Recruit ratings: Scout: Rivals: 247Sports: ESPN:				
Josh Madison; S	Newbury Park, CA	Newbury Park, CA	5 ft 11 in (1.80 m)	200 lb (91 kg)	Aug 29, 2017
Josh Madison; S	Recruit ratings: Scout: Rivals: 247Sports: ESPN: (69)				
Brayden Narveson; K	Scottsdale, AZ	Desert Mountain	6 ft 0 in (1.83 m)	190 lb (86 kg)	Apr 13, 2017
Brayden Narveson; K	Recruit ratings: Scout: Rivals: 247Sports: ESPN: (75)				
Corey Dunn; P	San Francisco, CA	City College of San Francisco	6 ft 1 in (1.85 m)	210 lb (95 kg)	Apr 28, 2017
Corey Dunn; P	Recruit ratings: Scout: Rivals: 247Sports:				
Overall recruit ranking: Scout: 55 Rivals: 53 247Sports: 55
Note: In many cases, Scout, Rivals, 247Sports, On3, and ESPN may conflict in their listings of height and weight.; In these cases, the average was taken. ESPN grades are on a 100-point scale.; Sources: "2018 Iowa State Football Commitment List". Rivals.; "2018 Iowa State Recruiting Class". ESPN.; "2018 Team Ranking". Rivals.com.; "Iowa State 2018 Football Commits". 247Sports.

== Awards and honors ==
All-Big 12
Player	Selection
Offense
David Montgomery	Coaches-2
Hakeem Butler	Coaches-2
Charlie Kolar	Coaches-2
Josh Knipfel	Coaches-HM
Julian Good-Jones	Coaches-HM
Bryce Meeker	Coaches-HM
Sam Seonbuchner	Coaches-HM
Defense
Greg Eisworth	Coaches-1
JaQuan Bailey	Coaches-2
Ray Lima	Coaches-2
Brian Peavy	Coaches-2
Spencer Benton	Coaches-HM
Willie Harvey Jr.	Coaches-HM
Mike Rose	Coaches-HM
Marcel Spears Jr.	Coaches-HM
Special Teams
Kene Nwangwu	Coaches-2

Individual Awards
Player	Award
Matt Campbell	Chuck Neinas Big 12 Coach of the Year

Weekly Awards
Player	Award	Date Awarded
Brock Purdy	Big 12 Newcomer of the Week	October 8, 2018
Braxton Lewis	Big 12 Defensive Player of the Week	October 8, 2018
Brock Purdy	Big 12 Newcomer of the Week	October 15, 2018
JaQuan Bailey	Big 12 Co-defensive Player of the Week	October 15, 2018
Marcel Spears Jr.	Big 12 Defensive Player of the Week	October 29, 2018
Brock Purdy	Big 12 Newcomer of the Week	November 5, 2018

== Statistics ==
=== Scoring ===
Scores against non-conference opponents

	1	2	3	4	Total
Opponents	21	27	16	14	78
Iowa State	17	43	27	21	108

Scores against the Big 12

	1	2	3	4	Total
Opponents	41	83	55	41	220
Iowa State	53	82	66	65	266

Scores against all opponents

	1	2	3	4	Total
Opponents	62	110	71	55	298
Iowa State	70	115	83	80	348

== TV ratings ==
Opponent	Outlet	Viewers	Rating
@ Iowa	FOX	2.017M	1.2
Oklahoma	ABC	3.434M	2.2
Akron	FSN	†	†
@ TCU	ESPNU	366K	†
@ Oklahoma State	ESPN2	726K	0.44
West Virginia	FS1	1.323M	0.75
Texas Tech	ESPN2	885K	0.55
@ Kansas	FSN	†	†
Baylor	FS1	363K	0.24
@ Texas	LHN	†	†
Kansas State	FS1	821K	0.49
Drake	Cyclones.tv	†	†
vs. Washington State	ESPN	5.547M	3.2

All totals via Sports Media Watch. Streaming numbers not included. † - Data not available.

== Players drafted into the NFL ==
Round	Pick	Player	Position	NFL club
3	73	David Montgomery	RB	Chicago Bears
4	103	Hakeem Butler	WR	Arizona Cardinals
