= Matt Campbell (American football coach) =

American football player and coach (born 1979)

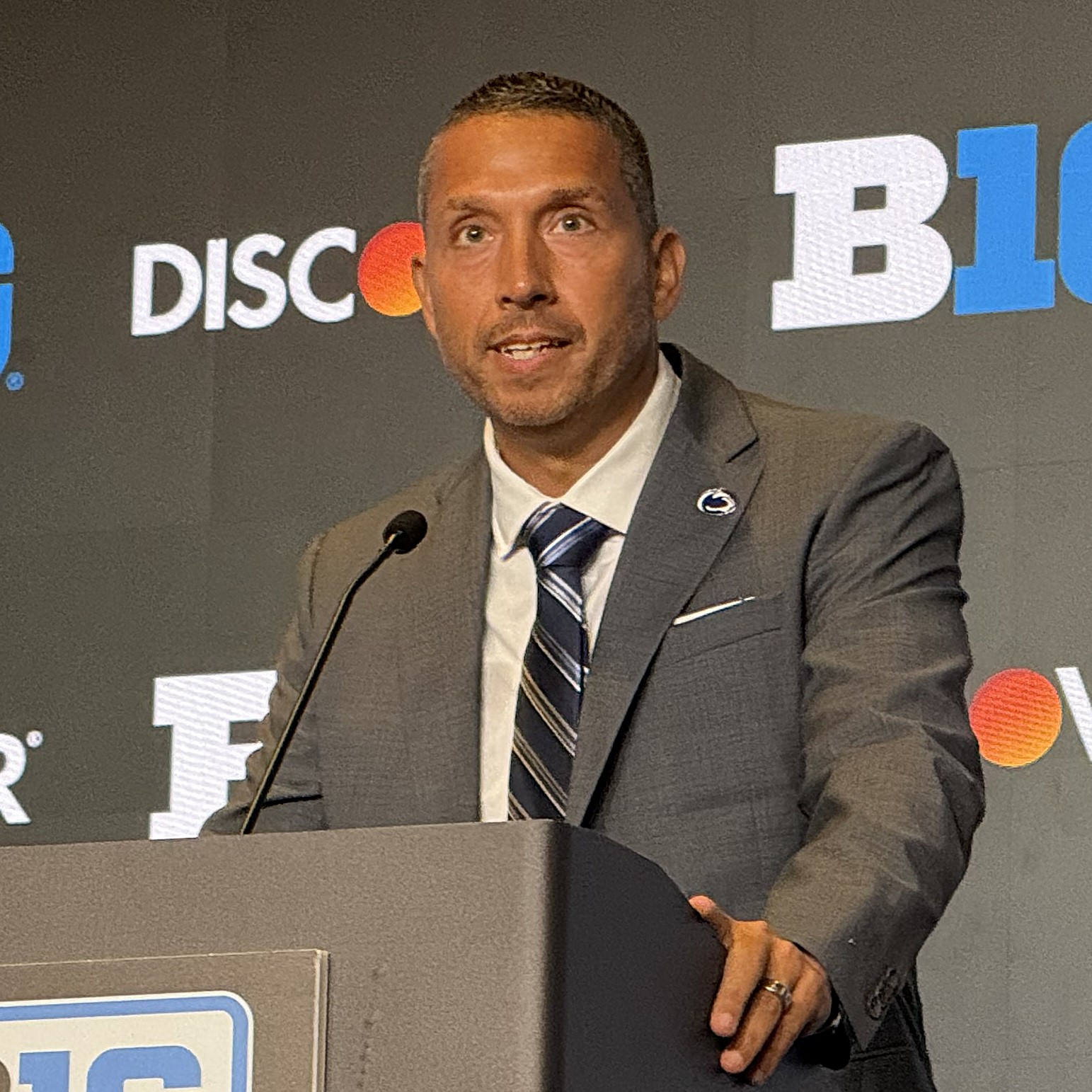
- Campbell at 2026 Big Ten Media Days

Current position
- Title: Head coach
- Team: Penn State
- Conference: Big Ten
- Record: 6–5

Biographical details
- Born: November 29, 1979 (age 46); Massillon, Ohio, U.S.

Playing career
- 1998: Pittsburgh
- 1999–2002: Mount Union
- Position: Defensive line

Coaching career (HC unless noted)
- 2003–2004: Bowling Green (GA)
- 2005–2006: Mount Union (OC/OL)
- 2007: Bowling Green (OL)
- 2008: Bowling Green (RGC/OL)
- 2009: Toledo (RGC/OL)
- 2010–2011: Toledo (OC/OL)
- 2012–2015: Toledo
- 2016–2025: Iowa State
- 2026–present: Penn State

Head coaching record
- Overall: 113–75
- Bowls: 5–5

Accomplishments and honors

Championships
- 2 MAC West Division (2014–2015)

Awards
- MAC Coach of the Year (2015); 3× Big 12 Coach of the Year (2017, 2018, 2020); 2× AP Big 12 Coach of the Year (2017, 2020)

Matthew Allen Campbell (born November 29, 1979) is an American college football coach who is the current head football coach at Pennsylvania State University. Campbell was head football coach at the University of Toledo from 2011 to 2015, and at Iowa State University from 2016 to 2025. Prior to that, Campbell had been an assistant at Toledo, Bowling Green, and Mount Union. Campbell grew up in Ohio and briefly attended the University of Pittsburgh before transferring to Mount Union, where he played offensive receiver.

== Playing career ==
Campbell was born in Massillon, Ohio. His father Rick coached football at Jackson High School. Matt played football at rival Perry, which won three conference championships while he was on the team. Campbell initially attended the University of Pittsburgh on an athletic scholarship in 1998, but transferred to the University of Mount Union after a year. At Mount Union, Campbell played on the defensive line between 1999 and 2002. At Mount Union, Campbell played for head coach Larry Kehres, whose teams won three Division III championships during Campbell's career. Campbell himself was twice named to the College Football All-America Team and named Ohio Athletic Conference Defensive Lineman of the Year.

== Coaching career ==
After college, Campbell stayed within Ohio and took a job as a graduate assistant at Bowling Green State University from 2003 to 2004. While at Bowling Green Scott Pioli, then the director of player personnel for the New England Patriots, offered Campbell an interview for a job at the team, but Campbell declined. Campbell returned to Mount Union for 2005–2006 as offensive coordinator; Mount Union won the Division III championship both years. Campbell then went back to Bowling Green for two years, first as offensive line coach (2007) and then as offensive line coach/run game coordinator (2008). The University of Toledo hired him as the run game coordinator for the 2009 season. This move reunited him with head coach Tim Beckman, defensive coordinator at Bowling Green during Campbell's first stint there.

=== Toledo ===
Toledo promoted Campbell to offensive coordinator in 2010. Toledo made Campbell the permanent head coach at the end of 2011 when Beckman departed for the University of Illinois. He was 32 years old and the youngest head coach in the Football Bowl Subdivision. Two weeks into the job, Toledo defeated Air Force in the Military Bowl. Reportedly Campbell passed on a chance to serve on Urban Meyer's staff at Ohio State University. Campbell coached four full seasons at Toledo: 2012–2015, amassing a record of 35–15. The 2015 team peaked at No. 19 in the AP Poll, including a victory over Arkansas.

=== Iowa State ===
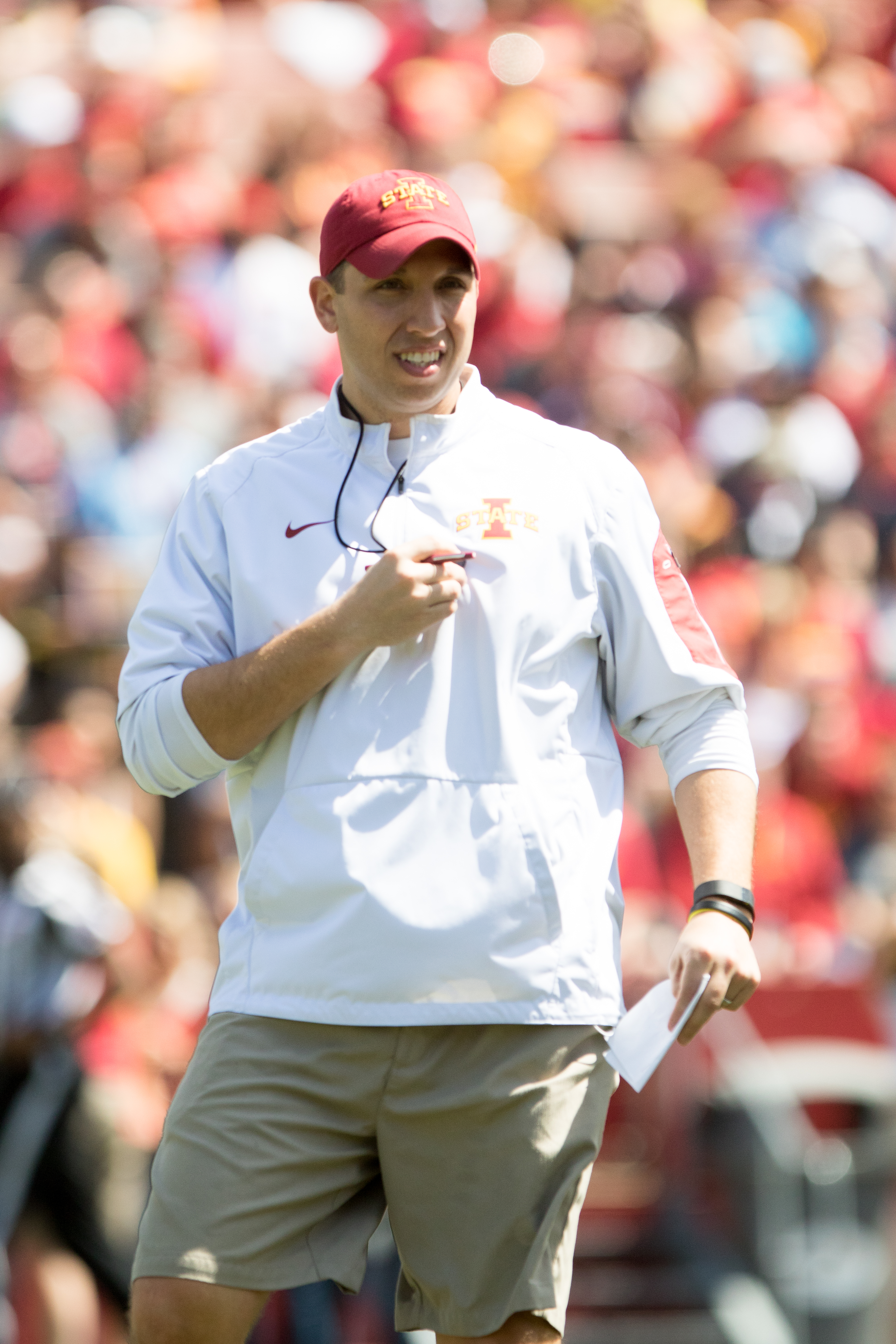
Campbell at the 2016 Iowa State spring football game

Iowa State University named Campbell its head coach on November 29, 2015, his 36th birthday, replacing the fired Paul Rhoads. Campbell signed a six-year, $22.5 million extension with the school on November 27, 2017. Campbell was named the Big 12 Coach of the Year twice. In his second year, Campbell led Iowa State to an 8–5 season that included wins against No. 3 Oklahoma and No. 4 TCU. Iowa State won their bowl game that year against the Memphis Tigers in the Liberty Bowl. During his third year at Iowa State, he led the Cyclones to a second 8–5 season. This included a 6–3 record in Big 12 play, their most conference wins in history. In 2018, Campbell was reportedly requested for an interview for the New York Jets NFL team, however, he declined the interview.

In the pandemic-shortened 2020 season, Campbell led the Cyclones to their best season in decades. The Cyclones finished in first place in the Big 12, their first regular-season first-place finish of any sort in 119 years. However, they lost the Big 12 title game to Oklahoma. They were selected for the 2021 Fiesta Bowl, the first major-bowl appearance in school history, and defeated No. 25 Oregon 34–17. They finished ninth in both major polls, the highest final ranking in school history.

On February 8, 2021, Iowa State announced a new contract extension for Campbell through the 2028 season. It was reported that Campbell was offered an eight-year, $68.5 million deal by the Detroit Lions for their head coaching position in 2021, but other reports said that the Lions never put an offer on the table.

On September 28, 2024, Campbell passed Dan McCarney to become the winningest coach in school history with a shutout victory over Houston. Additionally in 2024, the program got off to its best start since 1938 and reached 11 wins for the first time ever by winning the 2024 Pop-Tarts Bowl against No. 15 Miami (FL) in a 42–41 win. This bowl game win marked the fourth time in the season that Iowa State got a winning score with less than two minutes remaining.

On August 1, 2025, Campbell finalized a contract extension through the 2032 season. He followed this up with a season-opening win over 17th ranked Kansas State, who was the favorite to win the Big 12, in the Aer Lingus College Football Classic in Dublin, Ireland. This marked Campbell's 100th career victory as a head coach.

=== Penn State ===
On December 5, 2025, Campbell agreed to become the next head coach at Pennsylvania State University. He replaced James Franklin, who was fired earlier in the season.

== Head coaching record ==
Year	Team	Overall	Conference	Standing	Bowl/playoffs	Coaches^{#}	AP^{°}
Toledo Rockets (Mid-American Conference) (2011–2015)
2011	Toledo	1–0	0–0		W Military		
2012	Toledo	9–4	6–2	T–2nd (West)	L Famous Idaho Potato		
2013	Toledo	7–5	5–3	T–3rd (West)			
2014	Toledo	9–4	7–1	T–1st (West)	W GoDaddy		
2015	Toledo	9–2	6–2	T–1st (West)	Boca Raton*		
Toledo:		35–15	24–8	* Departed Toledo for Iowa State before bowl game			
Iowa State Cyclones (Big 12 Conference) (2016–2025)
2016	Iowa State	3–9	2–7	9th			
2017	Iowa State	8–5	5–4	T–4th	W Liberty		
2018	Iowa State	8–5	6–3	T–3rd	L Alamo		
2019	Iowa State	7–6	5–4	T–3rd	L Camping World		
2020	Iowa State	9–3	8–1	1st	W Fiesta^{†}	9	9
2021	Iowa State	7–6	5–4	4th	L Cheez-It		
2022	Iowa State	4–8	1–8	10th			
2023	Iowa State	7–6	6–3	T–4th	L Liberty		
2024	Iowa State	11–3	7–2	T–1st	W Pop-Tarts	15	15
2025	Iowa State	8–4	5–4	T–7th			
Iowa State:		72–55	50–40				
Penn State Nittany Lions (Big Ten Conference) (2026–present)
2026	Penn State	6–5	3–5				
Penn State:		6–5	3–5				
Total:		113–75					
National championship Conference title Conference division title or championship game berth
^{†}Indicates CFP / New Years' Six bowl.; ^{#}Rankings from final Coaches Poll.; ^{°}Rankings from final AP Poll.

== Personal life ==
In the summer of 2022, Campbell served as the head coach of the Gilbert sixth grade softball team. The team defeated Roland-Story in the championship game. He has four children with his wife, Erica Campbell.

While playing at Mount Union, Campbell was roommates and close friends with Philadelphia Eagles head coach Nick Sirianni.
