= 2018 Big 12 Conference football season =

American college football season

- League: NCAA Division I Football Bowl Subdivision
- Sport: Football
- Duration: August 30, 2018 through December 1, 2018
- Teams: 10
- TV partner(s): Fox Family (FOX, FS1, FSN), ESPN Family (ABC, ESPN, ESPN2, ESPN3, ESPNU, ESPN+, LHN)

2019 NFL Draft
- Top draft pick: Kyler Murray (Oklahoma)
- Picked by: Arizona Cardinals, 1st overall

Regular season

Championship Game
- Champions: Oklahoma
- Runners-up: Texas

Seasons
- 2017 2019

2018 Big 12 Conference football standings
	Conf.			Overall
Team	W		L	W		L
No. 4 Oklahoma y$^	8	–	1	12	–	2
No. 9 Texas y	7	–	2	10	–	4
Iowa State	6	–	3	8	–	5
No. 20 West Virginia	6	–	3	8	–	4
TCU	4	–	5	7	–	6
Baylor	4	–	5	7	–	6
Oklahoma State	3	–	6	7	–	6
Kansas State	3	–	6	5	–	7
Texas Tech	3	–	6	5	–	7
Kansas	1	–	8	3	–	9
Championship: Oklahoma 39, Texas 27
^ – College Football Playoff participant; $ – Conference champion; y – Championship game participant; Rankings from AP Poll

The 2018 Big 12 Conference football season was the 23rd season of Big 12 Conference football, part of the 2018 NCAA Division I FBS football season. The season began with non-conference play on August 30, 2018. Big 12 Conference play began on September 22, 2018.

The 2018 season was the seventh for the Big 12 since the 2010–13 Big 12 Conference realignment brought the Big 12 membership to its current form.

As a ten-team league, the Big 12 played a nine-game round-robin conference schedule and each member played three non-conference games, one of which had to be against another Power Five conference foe. The regular season was followed by a conference championship game played between the regular-season champion and regular-season runner-up. The 2018 Big 12 Championship Game was held on Saturday, December 1, 2018. Oklahoma defeated Texas 39–27 to win their 12th Big 12 Championship.

== Preseason ==
=== Recruiting ===
National rankings
Team	ESPN	Rivals	Scout	24/7	Total signees
Baylor	#17	#55	#47	#36	15
Iowa State	#54	#53	#45	#52	29
Kansas	NR	#100	#94	#81	19
Kansas State	#70	#76	#73	#71	21
Oklahoma	#21	#16	#19	#22	22
Oklahoma State	#46	#48	#42	#43	21
TCU	#23	#20	#13	#18	24
Texas	#10	#7	#3	#9	28
Texas Tech	#42	#46	#31	#47	25
West Virginia	#37	#38	#36	#41	28

=== Preseason poll ===
The 2018 Big12 Preseason media poll was announced on July 12, 2018, prior to the Big12 media days. The Big12 media days were held from July 16–17 in Frisco, Texas. Oklahoma was chosen to finish at the top of the standings for the third consecutive year in the 2018 Big 12 football preseason poll, voted on by media representatives.

1. Oklahoma (46) – 509
2. West Virginia (2) – 432
3. TCU (1) – 390
4. Texas (1) – 370
5. Oklahoma State – 300
6. Kansas State (2) – 283
7. Iowa State – 250
8. Texas Tech – 149
9. Baylor – 125
10. Kansas – 52
- First place votes in ()

=== Preseason awards ===
2018 Preseason All-Big 12

- Offensive Player of the Year: Will Grier, West Virginia
- Defensive Player of the Year: Ben Banogu, TCU
- Newcomer of the Year: Brendan Radley-Hiles, Oklahoma

All-Big 12 Offense
Position	Player	Class	Team
QB	Will Grier	Sr.	West Virginia
RB	David Montgomery	Jr.	Iowa State
RB	Rodney Anderson	Jr.	Oklahoma
FB	Justice Hill	Jr.	Oklahoma State
WR	Denzel Mims	Jr.	Baylor
WR	Marquise Brown	Jr.	Oklahoma
WR	David Sills	Sr.	West Virginia
TE	Grant Calcaterra	So.	Oklahoma
OL	Dalton Risner	Sr.	Kansas State
OL	Bobby Evans	Jr.	Oklahoma
OL	Ben Powers	Sr.	Oklahoma
OL	Marcus Keyes	Jr.	Oklahoma State
OL	Yodny Cajuste	Sr.	West Virginia
PK	Austin Seibert	Sr.	Oklahoma
KR/PR	KaVontae Turpin	Sr.	TCU

All-Big 12 Defense
Position	Player	Class	Team
DL	JaQuan Bailey	Jr.	Iowa State
DL	Daniel Wise	Sr.	Kansas
DL	Jordan Brailford	Jr.	Oklahoma State
DL	Ben Banogu	Sr.	TCU
DL	Breckyn Hager	Sr.	Texas
LB	Joe Dineen Jr.	Sr.	Kansas
LB	Dakota Allen	Sr.	Texas Tech
LB	David Long Jr.	Jr.	West Virginia
DB	Brian Peavy	Sr.	Iowa State
DB	Kendall Adams	Sr.	Kansas State
DB	Kris Boyd	Sr.	Texas
DB	Jah'Shawn Johnson	Sr.	Texas Tech
DB	Justus Parker	Jr.	Texas Tech
P	Austin Seibert	Sr.	Oklahoma

== Head coaches ==
=== Coaches ===
Team	Head coach	Years at school	Overall record	Record at school	Big-12 record
Baylor	Matt Rhule	2	29–34 (.460)	1–11 (.083)	1–8 (.111)
Iowa State	Matt Campbell	3	46–29 (.613)	11–14 (.440)	7–11 (.389)
Kansas	David Beaty	4	3–33 (.083)	3–33 (.083)	1–26 (.037)
Kansas State	Bill Snyder	10	212–111–1 (.656)	212–111–1 (.656)	125–84–1 (.598)
Oklahoma	Lincoln Riley	2	16–2 (.889)	16–2 (.889)	9–1 (.900)
Oklahoma State	Mike Gundy	14	114–53 (.683)	114–53 (.683)	69–42 (.622)
TCU	Gary Patterson	18	160–57 (.737)	160–57 (.737)	100–40 (.714)
Texas	Tom Herman	2	29–10 (.744)	7–6 (.538)	5–4 (.556)
Texas Tech	Kliff Kingsbury	6	30–33 (.476)	30–33 (.476)	16–29 (.356)
West Virginia	Dana Holgorsen	8	53–37 (.589)	53–37 (.589)	32–29 (.525)

== Schedule ==
=== Regular season ===
Index to colors and formatting
Big 12 member won
Big 12 member lost
Big 12 teams in **bold**

==== Week one ====
Schedule and results:

Date	Time	Visiting team	Home team	Site	TV	Result	Attendance	Ref.
August 30	7:00 p.m.	Missouri State	**Oklahoma State**	Boone Pickens Stadium • Stillwater, OK	FS1	**W** 58–17	50,103	
September 1	11:00 a.m.	Ole Miss	**Texas Tech**	NRG Stadium • Houston, TX (AdvoCare Texas Kickoff)	ESPN	**L** 27–47	40,333	
September 1	11:00 a.m.	Florida Atlantic	No. 7 **Oklahoma**	Gaylord Family Oklahoma Memorial Stadium • Norman, OK	FOX	**W** 63–14	86,402	
September 1	11:00 a.m.	Southern	No. 16 **TCU**	Amon G. Carter Stadium • Fort Worth, TX	FSN	**W** 55–7	42,219	
September 1	12:00 p.m.	No. 23 **Texas**	Maryland	FedExField • Landover, MD	FS1	**L** 29–34	47,641	
September 1	3:30 p.m.	Tennessee	No. 17 **West Virginia**	Bank of America Stadium • Charlotte, North Carolina (Belk Kickoff Game)	CBS	**W** 40–14	66,793	
September 1	6:00 p.m.	Nicholls State	**Kansas**	David Booth Kansas Memorial Stadium • Lawrence, KS	JayhawkTV	**L** 23–26 ^{OT}	24,305	
September 1	6:00 p.m.	South Dakota	**Kansas State**	Bill Snyder Family Football Stadium • Manhattan, KS	ESPN3	**W** 27–24	50,063	
September 1	7:00 p.m.	Abilene Christian	**Baylor**	McLane Stadium • Waco, TX	FSN	**W** 55–27	45,330	
September 1	7:00 p.m.	~~South Dakota State~~	~~**Iowa State**~~	~~Jack Trice Stadium~~ • ~~Ames, IA~~	~~Cyclones.tv~~	**Cancelled**		
^{#}Rankings from AP Poll released prior to game. All times are in Central Time.

==== Week two ====
Schedule and results:

Date	Time	Visiting team	Home team	Site	TV	Result	Attendance	Ref.
September 7	7:00 p.m.	No. 16 **TCU**	SMU	Gerald J. Ford Stadium • University Park, TX	ESPN2	**W** 42–12	24,216	
September 8	11:00 a.m.	No. 18 Mississippi State	**Kansas State**	Bill Snyder Family Football Stadium • Manhattan, KS	ESPN	**L** 10–31	49,784	
September 8	12:00 p.m.	UCLA	No. 6 **Oklahoma**	Gaylord Family Oklahoma Memorial Stadium • Norman, OK	FOX	**W** 49–21	86,402	
September 8	2:00 p.m.	**Kansas**	Central Michigan	Kelly/Shorts Stadium • Mount Pleasant, MI	ESPN+	**W** 31–7	18,127	
September 8	3:00 p.m.	Lamar	**Texas Tech**	Jones AT&T Stadium • Lubbock, TX	FSN	**W** 77–0	52,126	
September 8	4:00 p.m.	**Iowa State**	Iowa	Kinnick Stadium • Iowa City, IA (Battle for the Cy-Hawk Trophy)	FOX	**L** 3–13	69,250	
September 8	6:00 p.m.	**Baylor**	UTSA	Alamodome • San Antonio, TX	CBSSN	**W** 37–20	42,071	
September 8	6:00 p.m.	Youngstown State	No. 14 **West Virginia**	Mountaineer Field • Morgantown, WV	AT&TSN Pitt	**W** 52–17	58,446	
September 8	7:00 p.m.	Tulsa	**Texas**	Darrell K Royal–Texas Memorial Stadium • Austin, TX	LHN	**W** 28–21	90,563	
September 8	7:00 p.m.	South Alabama	**Oklahoma State**	Boone Pickens Stadium • Stillwater, OK	FSN	**W** 55–13	53,923	
^{#}Rankings from AP Poll released prior to game. All times are in Central Time.

==== Week three ====
Schedule and results:

Date	Time	Visiting team	Home team	Site	TV	Result	Attendance	Ref.
September 15	11:00 a.m.	No. 5 **Oklahoma**	**Iowa State**	Jack Trice Stadium • Ames, IA	ABC	**OU** 37–27		
September 15	11:00 a.m.	Rutgers	**Kansas**	David Booth Kansas Memorial Stadium • Lawrence, KS	FSN	**W** 55–14	28,044	
September 15	2:00 p.m.	Duke	**Baylor**	McLane Stadium • Waco, TX	FS1	**L** 27–40	40,442	
September 15	2:30 p.m.	No. 17 Boise State	No. 24 **Oklahoma State**	Boone Pickens Stadium • Stillwater, OK	ESPN	**W** 44–21	54,974	
September 15	3:00 p.m.	UTSA	**Kansas State**	Bill Snyder Family Football Stadium • Manhattan, KS	FSN	**W** 41–17	50,618	
September 15	3:00 p.m.	Houston	**Texas Tech**	Jones AT&T Stadium • Lubbock, TX	FOX	**W** 63–49	53,484	
~~September 15~~	~~3:30 p.m.~~	~~**West Virginia**~~	~~NC State~~	~~Carter–Finley Stadium~~ • ~~Raleigh, NC~~	~~FS1~~	**Cancelled** (Note: This game was cancelled due to Hurricane Florence.)		
September 15	7:00 p.m.	No. 22 USC	**Texas**	Darrell K Royal–Texas Memorial Stadium • Austin, TX	FOX	**W** 37–14	103,507	
September 15	7:00 p.m.	No. 4 Ohio State	No. 15 **TCU**	AT&T Stadium • Arlington, TX	ABC	**L** 28–40	64,362	
^{#}Rankings from AP Poll released prior to game. All times are in Central Time.

==== Week four ====
Schedule and results:

Date	Time	Visiting team	Home team	Site	TV	Result	Attendance	Ref.
September 22	11:00 a.m.	Akron	**Iowa State**	Jack Trice Stadium • Ames, IA	FSN	**W** 26–13	54,028	
September 22	2:30 p.m.	**Kansas**	**Baylor**	McLane Stadium • Waco, TX	FS1	**BU** 26–7	36,725	
September 22	2:30 p.m.	**Kansas State**	No. 12 **West Virginia**	Mountaineer Field • Morgantown, WV	ESPN	**WVU** 35–6	59,245	
September 22	3:30 p.m.	No. 17 **TCU**	**Texas**	Darrell K Royal-Texas Memorial Stadium • Austin, TX	FOX	**UT** 31–16	100,321	
September 22	6:00 p.m.	Army	No. 5 **Oklahoma**	Gaylord Family Oklahoma Memorial Stadium • Norman, OK	FSN PPV	**W** 28–21 ^{OT}	87,177	
September 22	6:00 p.m.	**Texas Tech**	No. 15 **Oklahoma State**	Boone Pickens Stadium • Stillwater, OK (Rivalry)	FS1	**TTU** 41–17	53,166	
^{#}Rankings from AP Poll released prior to game. All times are in Central Time.

==== Week five ====
Schedule and results:

Date	Time	Visiting team	Home team	Site	TV	Result	Attendance	Ref.
September 29	11:00 a.m.	**Oklahoma State**	**Kansas**	David Booth Kansas Memorial Stadium • Lawrence, KS	FSN	**OSU** 48–28	18,364	
September 29	11:00 a.m.	No. 12 **West Virginia**	No. 25 **Texas Tech**	Jones AT&T Stadium • Lubbock, TX	ESPN2	**WVU** 42–34	55,283	
September 29	2:30 p.m.	**Baylor**	No. 6 **Oklahoma**	Gaylord Family Oklahoma Memorial Stadium • Norman, OK	ABC	**OU** 66–33	86,642	
September 29	6:00 p.m.	**Iowa State**	**TCU**	Amon G. Carter Stadium • Fort Worth, TX	ESPNU	**TCU** 17–14	42,664	
September 29	2:30 p.m.	No. 18 **Texas**	**Kansas State**	Bill Snyder Family Football Stadium • Manhattan, KS	FS1	**UT** 19–14	49,916	
^{#}Rankings from AP Poll released prior to game. All times are in Central Time.

==== Week six ====
Schedule and results:

Date	Time	Visiting team	Home team	Site	TV	Result	Attendance	Ref.
October 6	11:00 a.m.	**Kansas**	No. 9 **West Virginia**	Mountaineer Field • Morgantown, WV	ESPN2	**WVU** 38–22	57,419	
October 6	11:00 a.m.	No. 7 **Oklahoma**	No. 19 **Texas**	Cotton Bowl Stadium • Dallas, TX (Red River Showdown)	FOX	**UT** 48–45	92,300	
October 6	2:30 p.m.	**Iowa State**	No. 25 **Oklahoma State**	Boone Pickens Stadium • Stillwater, OK	ESPN2	**ISU** 48–42	52,995	
October 6	2:30 p.m.	**Kansas State**	**Baylor**	McLane Stadium • Waco, TX	FS1	**BU** 37–34	45,000	
^{#}Rankings from AP Poll released prior to game. All times are in Central Time.

==== Week seven ====
Schedule and results:

Date	Time	Visiting team	Home team	Site	TV	Result	Attendance	Ref.
October 11	6:30 p.m.	**Texas Tech**	**TCU**	Amon G. Carter Stadium • Fort Worth, TX (Rivalry)	ESPN	**TTU** 17–14	44,387	
October 13	11:00 a.m.	**Oklahoma State**	**Kansas State**	Bill Snyder Family Football Stadium • Manhattan, KS	ESPNU	**KSU** 31–12	50,245	
October 13	2:30 p.m.	**Baylor**	No. 9 **Texas**	Darrell K Royal–Texas Memorial Stadium • Austin, TX	ESPN	**UT** 23–17	93,882	
October 13	6:00 p.m.	No. 6 **West Virginia**	**Iowa State**	Jack Trice Stadium • Ames, IA	FS1	**ISU** 30–14	56,629	
^{#}Rankings from AP Poll released prior to game. All times are in Central Time.

==== Week eight ====
Schedule and results:

Date	Time	Visiting team	Home team	Site	TV	Result	Attendance	Ref.
October 20	11:00 a.m.	No. 9 **Oklahoma**	**TCU**	Amon G. Carter Stadium • Fort Worth, TX	ABC	**OU** 52–27	45,055	
October 20	2:30 p.m.	**Kansas**	**Texas Tech**	Jones AT&T Stadium • Lubbock, TX	FS1	**TTU** 48–16	54,402	
^{#}Rankings from AP Poll released prior to game. All times are in Central Time.

==== Week nine ====
Schedule and results:

Date	Time	Visiting team	Home team	Site	TV	Result	Attendance	Ref.
October 25	6:00 p.m.	**Baylor**	No. 13 **West Virginia**	Mountaineer Field • Morgantown, WV	FS1	**WVU** 58–14	53,117	
October 27	11:00 a.m.	**Texas Tech**	**Iowa State**	Jack Trice Stadium • Ames, IA	ESPN2	**ISU** 40–31	57,908	
October 27	2:00 p.m.	**TCU**	**Kansas**	David Booth Kansas Memorial Stadium • Lawrence, KS	FS1	**KU** 27–26	15,096	
October 27	2:30 p.m.	**Kansas State**	No. 8 **Oklahoma**	Gaylord Family Oklahoma Memorial Stadium • Norman, OK	FOX	**OU** 51–14	86,436	
October 27	7:00 p.m.	No. 6 **Texas**	**Oklahoma State**	Boone Pickens Stadium • Stillwater, OK	ABC	**OSU** 38–35	56,790	
^{#}Rankings from AP Poll released prior to game. All times are in Central Time.

==== Week ten ====
Schedule and results:

Date	Time	Visiting team	Home team	Site	TV	Result	Attendance	Ref.
November 3	11:00 a.m.	**Oklahoma State**	**Baylor**	McLane Stadium • Waco, TX	FS1	**BU** 35–31	43,492	
November 3	11:00 a.m.	**Iowa State**	**Kansas**	David Booth Kansas Memorial Stadium • Lawrence, KS	FSN	**ISU** 27–3	15,543	
November 3	2:30 p.m.	No. 12 **West Virginia**	No. 15 **Texas**	Darrell K Royal–Texas Stadium • Austin, TX	FOX	**WVU** 42–41	100,703	
November 3	2:30 p.m.	**Kansas State**	**TCU**	Amon G. Carter Stadium • Fort Worth, TX	FS1	**TCU** 14–13	40,486	
November 3	7:00 p.m.	No. 7 **Oklahoma**	**Texas Tech**	Jones AT&T Stadium • Lubbock, TX	ABC	**OU** 51–46	60,454	
^{#}Rankings from AP Poll released prior to game. All times are in Central Time.

==== Week eleven ====
Schedule and results:

Date	Time	Visiting team	Home team	Site	TV	Result	Attendance	Ref.
November 10	11:00 a.m.	**TCU**	No. 9 **West Virginia**	Mountaineer Field • Morgantown, WV	FS1	**WVU** 47–10	60,007	
November 10	11:00 a.m.	**Kansas**	**Kansas State**	Bill Snyder Family Football Stadium • Manhattan, KS (Sunflower Showdown)	FSN	**KSU** 21–17	50,062	
November 10	2:30 p.m.	**Baylor**	No. 23 **Iowa State**	Jack Trice Stadium • Ames, IA	FS1	**ISU** 28–14	53,860	
November 10	2:30 p.m.	**Oklahoma State**	No. 6 **Oklahoma**	Gaylord Family Oklahoma Memorial Stadium • Norman, OK (Bedlam Series)	ABC	**OU** 48–47	87,635	
November 10	6:30 p.m.	No. 15 **Texas**	**Texas Tech**	Jones AT&T Stadium • Lubbock, TX (Chancellor's Spurs)	FOX	**UT** 41–34	60,454	
^{#}Rankings from AP Poll released prior to game. All times are in Central Time.

==== Week twelve ====
Schedule and results:

Date	Time	Visiting team	Home team	Site	TV	Result	Attendance	Ref.
November 17	7:00 p.m.	No. 16 **Iowa State**	No. 15 **Texas**	Darrell K. Royal–Texas Memorial Stadium • Austin, TX	LHN	**UT** 24-10	102,498	
November 17	11:00 a.m.	**TCU**	**Baylor**	McLane Stadium • Waco, TX	FS1	**TCU** 16-9	45,140	
November 17	6:30 p.m.	**Kansas**	No. 6 **Oklahoma**	Gaylord Family Oklahoma Memorial Stadium • Norman, OK	FOX	**OU** 55-40	86,371	
November 17	2:30 p.m.	**Texas Tech**	**Kansas State**	Bill Snyder Family Football Stadium • Manhattan, KS	ESPNU	**KSU** 21-6	47,287	
November 17	2:30 p.m.	No. 9 **West Virginia**	**Oklahoma State**	Boone Pickens Stadium • Stillwater, OK	ABC	**OSU** 45-41	52,842	
^{#}Rankings from AP Poll released prior to game. All times are in Central Time.

==== Week thirteen ====
Schedule and results:

Date	Time	Visiting team	Home team	Site	TV	Result	Attendance	Ref.
November 23	11:00 a.m.	No. 14 **Texas**	**Kansas**	David Booth Kansas Memorial Stadium • Lawrence, KS	FS1	**UT** 24–17	15,219	
November 23	7:00 p.m.	No. 6 **Oklahoma**	No. 13 **West Virginia**	Mountaineer Field • Morgantown, WV	ESPN	**OU** 59–56	60,713	
November 24	7:00 p.m.	**Oklahoma State**	**TCU**	Amon G. Carter Stadium • Fort Worth, TX	FOX	**TCU** 31–24	42,394	
November 24	6:00 p.m.	**Kansas State**	No. 25 **Iowa State**	Jack Trice Stadium • Ames, IA (Rivalry)	FS1	**ISU** 42–38	54,430	
November 24	11:00 a.m.	**Baylor**	**Texas Tech**	AT&T Stadium • Arlington, TX (Rivalry)	FS1	**BU** 35–24	27,308	
^{#}Rankings from AP Poll released prior to game. All times are in Central Time.

==== Week Fourteen ====
Schedule and results:

Date	Time	Visiting team	Home team	Site	TV	Result	Attendance	Ref.
December 1	11:00 a.m.	Drake	**Iowa State**	Jack Trice Stadium • Ames, IA		**W** **ISU** 27–24	56,738	
^{#}Rankings from AP Poll released prior to game. All times are in Central Time.

=== Championship game ===
Schedule and results:

Date	Time (CT)	Visiting team	Home team	Site	TV	Result	Attendance
December 1	11:00 a.m.	#14 **Texas**	#5 **Oklahoma**	AT&T Stadium • Arlington, TX	ABC	**OU** 39–27	83,114

== Big 12 vs other conferences ==
=== Big 12 vs Power 5 matchups ===
This is a list of the non-conference games that Big-12 teams will play versus the power conference teams. They comprise teams from the ACC, Big 10, Pac-12 and SEC. In addition, although the NCAA does not consider BYU a "Power Five" school, the Big-12 does consider games against BYU as satisfying its "Power Five" scheduling requirement. All rankings are from the current AP Poll at the time of the game. (Rankings from the AP Poll):

Date	Visitor	Home	Site	Significance	Score
September 1	Ole Miss	Texas Tech	NRG Stadium • Houston, TX	AdvoCare Texas Kickoff	L 27–47
September 1	No. 23 Texas	Maryland	FedEx Field • Landover, MD		L 29–34
September 1	Tennessee	No. 17 West Virginia	Bank of America Stadium • Charlotte, NC	Belk Kickoff Game	W 40–14
September 8	No. 18 Mississippi State	Kansas State	Bill Snyder Family Football Stadium • Manhattan, KS		L 10–31
September 8	Iowa State	Iowa	Kinnick Stadium • Iowa City, IA	Battle for the Cy-Hawk Trophy	L 3–13
September 8	UCLA	No. 6 Oklahoma	Gaylord Family Oklahoma Memorial Stadium • Norman, OK		W 49–21
September 15	Duke	Baylor	McLane Stadium • Waco, TX		L 27–40
September 15	Rutgers	Kansas	David Booth Kansas Memorial Stadium • Lawrence, KS		W 55–14
September 15	No. 22 USC	Texas	Darrell K Royal–Texas Memorial Stadium • Austin, Texas		W 37–14
~~September 15~~	~~No. 14 West Virginia~~	~~NC State~~	~~Carter–Finley Stadium • Raleigh, NC~~	Hurricane Florence	Canceled
September 15	No. 4 Ohio State	No. 15 TCU	AT&T Stadium • Arlington, TX	College Gameday	L 28–40

=== Records against other conferences ===
2018 records against non-conference foes as of: 9/2/2018

Regular Season

Power 5 Conferences	Record
ACC	0–1
Big Ten	1–3
Pac 12	2–0
BYU/Notre Dame	0–0
SEC	1–2
Power 5 Total	4–6
Other FBS Conferences	Record
American	3–0
C-USA	3–0
Independents (Excluding BYU and Notre Dame)	1–0
MAC	2–0
Mountain West	1–0
Sun Belt	1–0
Other FBS Total	10–0
FCS Opponents	Record
Football Championship Subdivision	7–1
Total Non-Conference Record	15–7

Post Season

Power Conferences 5	Record
ACC	0–1
Big Ten	0–0
Pac 12	1–1
SEC	3–1
Power 5 Total	4–3
Total Bowl Record	4–3

== Rankings ==
Legend
	Increase in ranking
	Decrease in ranking
RV	Received votes but were not ranked in Top 25 of poll

		Pre	Wk 1	Wk 2	Wk 3	Wk 4	Wk 5	Wk 6	Wk 7	Wk 8	Wk 9	Wk 10	Wk 11	Wk 12	Wk 13	Wk 14	Final
Baylor	AP																
Baylor	C																
Baylor	CFP	Not released															
Iowa State	AP	RV	RV														
Iowa State	C	RV	RV														
Iowa State	CFP	Not released															
Kansas	AP																
Kansas	C																
Kansas	CFP	Not released															
Kansas State	AP	RV	RV														
Kansas State	C	RV	RV														
Kansas State	CFP	Not released															
Oklahoma	AP	7	6														
Oklahoma	C	5	5														
Oklahoma	CFP	Not released															
Oklahoma State	AP	RV	RV														
Oklahoma State	C	25	23														
Oklahoma State	CFP	Not released															
TCU	AP	16	16														
TCU	C	16	16														
TCU	CFP	Not released															
Texas	AP	23															
Texas	C	21															
Texas	CFP	Not released															
Texas Tech	AP																
Texas Tech	C																
Texas Tech	CFP	Not released															
West Virginia	AP	17	14														
West Virginia	C	20	17														
West Virginia	CFP	Not released															

== Postseason ==
=== Bowl games ===
Legend
Big 12 win
Big 12 loss

Bowl game	Date	Site	Television	Time (CST)	Big 12 team	Opponent	Score	Attendance
Cheez-It Bowl	December 26	Chase Field • Phoenix, AZ	ESPN	8:00 p.m.	TCU	California	W 10–7	33,121
Texas Bowl	December 27	NRG Stadium • Houston, TX	ESPN	8:00 p.m.	Baylor	Vanderbilt	W 45–38	51,104
Camping World Bowl	December 28	Camping World Stadium • Orlando, FL	ESPN	4:15 p.m.	No. 16 West Virginia	No. 20 Syracuse	L 18–34	41,125
Alamo Bowl	December 28	Alamodome • San Antonio, TX	ESPN	8:00 p.m.	No. 24 Iowa State	No. 13 Washington State	L 26–28	60,675
Liberty Bowl	December 31	Liberty Bowl Memorial Stadium • Memphis, TN	ESPN	3:45 p.m.	Oklahoma State	Missouri	W 38–33	51,587
New Year's Six
Sugar Bowl	January 1	Mercedes-Benz Superdome • New Orleans, LA	ESPN	8:45 p.m.	No. 15 Texas	No. 5 Georgia	W 28–21	71,449
College Football Playoff
Orange Bowl (Semifinal)	December 29	Hard Rock Stadium • Miami Gardens, FL	ESPN	7:00 p.m.	No. 4 Oklahoma	No. 1 Alabama	L 34–45	66,203

Rankings are from AP Poll. All times Central Time Zone.

* Rankings based on CFP rankings

Selection of teams (7): Baylor, Iowa State, Oklahoma, Oklahoma State, TCU, Texas, West Virginia

== Awards and honors ==
=== Player of the week honors ===
Week	Offensive			Defensive			Specialist			Newcomer		
Week	Player	Team	Position	Player	Team	Position	Player	Team	Position	Player	Team	Position
Week 1 (Sept. 4)	Will Grier	West Virginia	QB	Curtis Bolton	Oklahoma	LB	Isaiah Zuber	Kansas State	WR	Chuba Hubbard; Derius Davis	Oklahoma State; TCU	RB; WR
Week 2 (Sept. 10)	Kyler Murray	Oklahoma	QB	Joe Dineen Jr.	Kansas	LB	KaVontae Turpin	TCU	WR	Pooka Williams Jr.	Kansas	RB
Week 3 (Sept. 17)	Kyler Murray (2)	Oklahoma	QB	Gary Johnson	Texas	LB	Amen Ogbongbemiga; Austin Seibert	Oklahoma State; Oklahoma	LB; PK	Alan Bowman	Texas Tech	QB
Week 4 (Sept. 24)	Will Grier (2)	West Virginia	QB	Kenneth Murray	Oklahoma	LB	Drew Galitz	Baylor	P	Caden Sterns	Texas	DB
Week 5 (Oct. 1)	Kyler Murray (3)	Oklahoma	QB	Jordan Brailford	Oklahoma State	DE	D'Shawn Jamison	Texas	WR	Keith Washington; Pooka Williams Jr. (2)	West Virginia; Kansas	CB; RB
Week 6 (Oct. 8)	Sam Ehlinger	Texas	QB	Braxton Lewis	Iowa State	DB	Cameron Dicker	Texas	K	Brock Purdy	Iowa State	QB
Week 7 (Oct. 15)	Alex Barnes	Kansas State	RB	Duke Shelley; JaQuan Bailey	Kansas State; Iowa State	DB; DE	Dominic Panazzolo	Texas Tech	P	Brock Purdy	Iowa State	QB
Week 8 (Oct. 22)	Kyler Murray (4)	Oklahoma	QB	Dakota Allen	Texas Tech	LB	Clayton Hatfield	Texas Tech	K	Kennedy Brooks	Oklahoma	RB
Week 9 (Oct. 29)	Taylor Cornelius	Oklahoma State	QB	Marcel Spears Jr.	Iowa State	LB	Gabriel Rui; Zach Sinor	Kansas; Oklahoma State	K P	Pooka Williams Jr. (3)	Kansas	RB
Week 10 (Nov. 5)	Will Grier (3)	West Virginia	QB	Clay Johnston	Baylor	LB	Evan Staley	West Virginia	K	Jalen Hurd; Brock Purdy (2)	Baylor; Iowa State	WR; QB
Week 11 (Nov. 12)	Lil'Jordan Humphrey	Texas	WR	Joe Dineen Jr. Davante Davis	Kansas; Texas	LB; DB	Cameron Dicker (2)	Texas	K	Kennedy Brooks (2)	Oklahoma	RB
Week 12 (Nov. 19)	Taylor Cornelius (2)	Oklahoma State	QB	Ben Banogu	TCU	DE	Blake Lynch	Kansas State	K	Pooka Williams Jr. (4)	Kansas	RB
Week 13 (Nov. 26)	Kyler Murray (5)	Oklahoma	QB	Juwuan Johnson	TCU	LB	Austin Seibert (2)	Oklahoma	K/P	Kennedy Brooks (3)	Oklahoma	RB

=== Postseason awards ===
2018 Consensus All-Americans

The following Big 12 players were named to the 2017 College Football All-America Team by the Walter Camp Football Foundation (WCFF), Associated Press (AP), Football Writers Association of America (FWAA), Sporting News (SN), and American Football Coaches Association (AFCA): Ben Powers, OL, Oklahoma.

Academic All-America Team Member of the Year (CoSIDA)

Consensus All-Americans
Player	Position	Class	Team
Ben Powers	OL	Senior	Oklahoma

==== 2018 All-Big 12 ====
- Offensive Player of the Year: Kyler Murray, QB, Oklahoma
- Defensive Player of the Year: David Long Jr., LB, West Virginia
- Offensive Freshman of the Year: Pooka Williams Jr., RB, Kansas
- Defensive Freshman of the Year: Caden Sterns, DB, Texas
- Offensive Lineman of the Year: Dalton Risner, Kansas State, Dru Samia, Oklahoma & Yodny Cajuste, West Virginia
- Defensive Lineman of the Year: Charles Omenihu, Texas
- Offensive Newcomer of the Year: Jalen Hurd, WR, Baylor
- Defensive Newcomer of the Year: Greg Eisworth, DB, Iowa State
- Special Teams Player of the Year: Austin Seibert, P/K, Oklahoma
- Coach of the Year: Matt Campbell, Iowa State & Lincoln Riley, Oklahoma

All-Big 12 Offense
Position	Player	Class	Team
QB	Kyler Murray	Junior	Oklahoma
RB	Pooka Williams Jr.	Freshman	Kansas
RB	Justice Hill	Junior	Oklahoma State
FB	Andrew Beck	Senior	Texas
WR	Marquise Brown	Junior	Oklahoma
WR	Tylan Wallace	Sophomore	Oklahoma State
WR	David Sills	Senior	West Virginia
TE	Grant Calcaterra	Sophomore	Oklahoma
TE	Trevon Wesco	Senior	West Virginia
OL	Dalton Risner	Senior	Kansas State
OL	Cody Ford	Junior	Oklahoma
OL	Ben Powers	Senior	Oklahoma
OL	Dru Samia	Senior	Oklahoma
OL	Yodny Cajuste	Senior	West Virginia
PK	Austin Seibert	Senior	Oklahoma
PK	Clayton Hatfield	Senior	Texas Tech
KR/PR	Pooka Williams Jr.	Freshman	Kansas

All-Big 12 Defense
Position	Player	Class	Team
DL	Daniel Wise	Senior	Kansas
DL	Jordan Brailford	Junior	Oklahoma State
DL	Charles Omenihu	Senior	Texas
DL	Ben Banogu	Junior	TCU
DL	L. J. Collier	Senior	TCU
LB	Joe Dineen Jr.	Senior	Kansas
LB	Dakota Allen	Senior	Texas Tech
LB	David Long Jr.	Junior	West Virginia
DB	Greg Eisworth	Sophomore	Iowa State
DB	Kris Boyd	Senior	Texas
DB	Caden Sterns	Freshman	Texas
DB	Adrian Frye	Freshman	Texas Tech
DB	Kenny Robinson	Sophomore	West Virginia
P	Drew Galitz	Senior	Baylor

==== All-Academic ====
First team

Name	Pos.	School	Yr.	GPA	Major
Zach Reuter	WR	Kansas State	Sr.	4.0	Biochemistry/Pre-Med
Adam Holtorf	OL	Kansas State	Sr.	3.96	Agribusiness

Second team

Name	Pos.	School	Yr.	GPA	Major
Justice Hill	RB	Oklahoma State	Jr.	3.64	Finance

==== National award winners ====
- Kyler Murray, QB, Oklahoma: Heisman Trophy, Davey O'Brien Award, Manning Award, AP Player of the Year

== Home game attendance ==
Team	Stadium	Capacity	Game 1	Game 2	Game 3	Game 4	Game 5	Game 6	Game 7	Total	Average	% of Capacity
Baylor	McLane Stadium	45,140	**45,330**†	40,442	36,725	36,888	43,492		–		40,575	89%
Iowa State	Jack Trice Stadium	61,500	58,479†	54,028	56,629	57,908	53,860				56,180	91%
Kansas	Memorial Stadium	50,071	24,305	28,044†	18,364	15,069	15,543		–		20,265	40%
Kansas State	Bill Snyder Family Stadium	53,000	50,063	49,784	50,618†	49,916	50,245	50,062			50,114	94%
Oklahoma	Gaylord Family Oklahoma Memorial Stadium	86,112	**86,402**	**86,402**	**87,177**	**86,642**	**86,436**	**87,635**†			**86,782**	100.7%
Oklahoma State	Boone Pickens Stadium	56,790	50,103	53,924	54,974	53,166	52,995	56,790†			53,661	94%
TCU	Amon G. Carter Stadium	45,000	42,219	42,664	44,387	**45,055**†	40,486		–		42,962	95%
Texas	Darrell K Royal–Texas Memorial Stadium	100,119	90,563	**103,557**†‡	95,124	93,882	**100,703**	**102,498**	–		97,721	97.6%
Texas Tech	Jones AT&T Stadium	60,454	52,126	53,484	55,283	54,402	60,454†	60,454†	–	336,203	56,033	92%
West Virginia	Mountaineer Field	60,000	58,446	59,245	57,419	53,117	**60,007**†		–		57,646	96%

Bold – Exceed capacity
†Season High
‡ Record Stadium Attendance
