= 2018 All-Big 12 Conference football team =

The 2018 All-Big 12 Conference football team consists of American football players chosen as All-Big 12 Conference players for the 2018 Big 12 Conference football season. The conference recognizes two official All-Big 12 selectors: (1) the Big 12 conference coaches selected separate offensive and defensive units and named first- and second-team players (the "Coaches" team); and (2) a panel of sports writers and broadcasters covering the Big 12 also selected offensive and defensive units and named first- and second-team players (the "Media" team).

== Offensive selections ==
=== Quarterbacks ===
- Kyler Murray, Oklahoma (Coaches-1; Media-1)
- Will Grier, West Virginia (Coaches-2; Media-2)

=== Running backs ===
- Alex Barnes, Kansas State (Coaches-2; Media-1)
- Justice Hill, Oklahoma State (Coaches-1; Media-2)
- David Montgomery, Iowa State (Coaches-2; Media-1)
- Pooka Williams Jr., Kansas (Coaches-1; Media-2)

=== Fullbacks ===
- Andrew Beck, Texas (Coaches-1)
- Carson Meier, Oklahoma (Coaches-2)

=== Centers ===
- Zach Shackelford, Texas (Coaches-2; Media-1)
- Creed Humphrey, Oklahoma (Media-2)

=== Guards ===
- Ben Powers, Oklahoma (Coaches-1; Media-1)
- Dru Samia, Oklahoma (Coaches-1; Media-1)
- Jack Anderson, Texas Tech (Coaches-2; Media-2)
- Josh Sills, West Virginia (Coaches-2; Media-2)

=== Tackles ===
- Yodny Cajuste, West Virginia (Coaches-1; Media-1)
- Dalton Risner, Kansas State (Coaches-1; Media-1)
- Bobby Evans, Oklahoma (Coaches-1; Media-2)
- Cody Ford, Oklahoma (Coaches-2; Media-2)
- Hakeem Adeniji, Kansas (Coaches-2)

=== Tight ends ===
- Grant Calcaterra, Oklahoma (Coaches-1; Media-1)
- Trevon Wesco, West Virginia (Coaches-1; Media-2)
- Charlie Kolar, Iowa State (Coaches-2)

=== Receivers ===
- Marquise Brown, Oklahoma (Coaches-1; Media-1)
- Tylan Wallace, Oklahoma State (Coaches-1; Media-1)
- David Sills, West Virginia (Coaches-1; Media-2)
- Antoine Wesley, Texas Tech (Coaches-2; Media-1)
- Hakeem Butler, Iowa State (Coaches-2; Media-2)
- Jalen Reagor, TCU (Coaches-2)

== Defensive selections ==
=== Defensive linemen ===
- Ben Banogu, TCU (Coaches-1; Media-1)
- Charles Omenihu, Texas (Coaches-1; Media-1)
- Daniel Wise, Kansas (Coaches-1; Media-1)
- Jordan Brailford, Oklahoma State (Coaches-1; Media-2)
- L. J. Collier, TCU (Coaches-1; Media-2)
- James Lynch, Baylor (Coaches-2; Media-1)
- Kenny Bigelow Jr., West Virginia (Coaches-2; Media-2)
- Ray Lima, Iowa State (Coaches-2; Media-2)
- JaQuan Bailey, Iowa State (Coaches-2)
- Jarrell Owens, Oklahoma State (Coaches-2)

=== Linebackers ===
- Dakota Allen, Texas Tech (Coaches-1; Media-1)
- Joe Dineen Jr., Kansas (Coaches-1; Media-1)
- David Long Jr., West Virginia (Coaches-1; Media-1)
- Gary Johnson, Texas (Coaches-2; Media-2)
- Clay Johnston, Baylor (Coaches-2; Media-2)
- Kenneth Murray, Oklahoma (Coaches-2; Media-2)

=== Defensive backs ===
- Kris Boyd, Texas (Coaches-1; Media-1)
- Adrian Frye, Texas Tech (Coaches-1; Media-1)
- Kenny Robinson, West Virginia (Coaches-1; Media-1)
- Caden Sterns, Texas (Coaches-1; Media-1)
- Greg Eisworth, Iowa State (Coaches-1; Media-2)
- Jeff Gladney, TCU (Coaches-2; Media-2)
- Brian Peavy, Iowa State (Coaches-2; Media-2)
- Ridwan Issahaku, TCU (Coaches-2; Media-2)
- Duke Shelley, Kansas State (Coaches-2)
- A. J. Green, Oklahoma State (Coaches-2)

== Special teams ==
=== Kickers ===
- Austin Seibert, Oklahoma (Coaches-1; Media-1)
- Clayton Hatfield, Texas Tech (Coaches-1; Media-2)
- Cameron Dicker, Texas (Coaches-2)

=== Punters ===
- Drew Galitz, Baylor (Coaches-1; Media-1)
- Kyle Thompson, Kansas (Coaches-2; Media-2)

=== All-purpose / Return specialists ===
- Pooka Williams, Jr., Kansas (Coaches-1; Media-1)
- Tre Brown, Oklahoma (Coaches-2)
- CeeDee Lamb, Oklahoma (Media-2)
- Kene Nwangwu, Iowa State (Coaches-2)

== Key ==
Bold = selected as a first-team player by both the coaches and media panel

Coaches = selected by Big 12 Conference coaches

Media = selected by a media panel

== See also ==
- 2018 College Football All-America Team
