= Big 12 Conference football individual awards =

List of Big 12 Conference football awards

Coaches of the Big 12 Conference bestow the following individual awards at the end of each football season.

== Offensive Player of the Year ==
Positions key
QB	Quarterback	RB	Running back	WR	Wide receiver

Season	Player	School	Position
1996	Troy Davis	Iowa State	RB
1997	Ricky Williams	Texas	RB
1998	Ricky Williams (2)	Texas	RB
1999	Major Applewhite	Texas	QB
1999	Eric Crouch	Nebraska	QB
2000	Josh Heupel	Oklahoma	QB
2001	Eric Crouch (2)	Nebraska	QB
2002	Chris Brown	Colorado	RB
2003	Jason White	Oklahoma	QB
2004	Jason White (2)	Oklahoma	QB
2005	Vince Young	Texas	QB
2006	Zac Taylor	Nebraska	QB
2007	Chase Daniel	Missouri	QB
2008	Sam Bradford	Oklahoma	QB
2009	Colt McCoy	Texas	QB
2010	Justin Blackmon	Oklahoma State	WR
2011	Robert Griffin III	Baylor	QB
2012	Collin Klein	Kansas State	QB
2013	Bryce Petty	Baylor	QB
2014	Trevone Boykin	TCU	QB
2015	Baker Mayfield	Oklahoma	QB
2016	Dede Westbrook	Oklahoma	WR
2017	Baker Mayfield (2)	Oklahoma	QB
2018	Kyler Murray	Oklahoma	QB
2019	Chuba Hubbard	Oklahoma State	RB
2020	Breece Hall	Iowa State	RB
2021	Breece Hall (2)	Iowa State	RB
2022	Max Duggan	TCU	QB
2023	Ollie Gordon II	Oklahoma State	RB
2024	Shedeur Sanders	Colorado	QB
2025	LJ Martin	BYU	RB

School (Seasons)	Winners	Years
Oklahoma (1996–2024)	8	2000, 2003, 2004, 2008, 2015, 2016, 2017, 2018
Texas (1996–2024)	5	1997, 1998, 1999, 2005, 2009
Iowa State (1996–present)	3	1996, 2020, 2021
Nebraska (1996–2011)	3	1999, 2001, 2006
Oklahoma State (1996–present)	3	2010, 2019, 2023
Baylor (1996–present)	2	2011, 2013
Colorado (1996–2011, 2024–present)	2	2002, 2024
TCU (2012–present)	2	2014, 2022
BYU (2023–present)	1	2025
Kansas State (1996–present)	1	2012
Missouri (1996–2012)	1	2007

== Defensive Player of the Year ==
Positions key
CB	Cornerback	DB	Defensive back	DE	Defensive end
DL	Defensive line	DT	Defensive tackle	LB	Linebacker

Season	Player	School	Position
1996	Grant Wistrom	Nebraska	DE
1997	Grant Wistrom (2)	Nebraska	DE
1998	Dat Nguyen	Texas A&M	LB
1999	Mark Simoneau	Kansas State	LB
2000	Rocky Calmus	Oklahoma	LB
2000	Casey Hampton	Texas	DL
2001	Roy Williams	Oklahoma	DB
2002	Terence Newman	Kansas State	DB
2003	Teddy Lehman	Oklahoma	LB
2004	Derrick Johnson	Texas	LB
2005	Nick Reid	Kansas	LB
2005	Dwayne Slay	Texas Tech	DB
2006	Rufus Alexander	Oklahoma	LB
2006	Aaron Ross	Texas	DB
2007	Jordon Dizon	Colorado	LB
2007	Curtis Lofton	Oklahoma	LB
2008	Brian Orakpo	Texas	DL
2009	Ndamukong Suh	Nebraska	DL
2010	Prince Amukamara	Nebraska	DB
2011	Frank Alexander	Oklahoma	DE
2011	A. J. Klein	Iowa State	LB
2012	Arthur Brown	Kansas State	LB
2013	Jackson Jeffcoat	Texas	DE
2013	Jason Verrett	TCU	CB
2014	Paul Dawson	TCU	LB
2015	Andrew Billings	Baylor	DT
2015	Emmanuel Ogbah	Oklahoma State	DE
2016	Jordan Willis	Kansas State	DE
2017	Malik Jefferson	Texas	LB
2017	Ogbonnia Okoronkwo	Oklahoma	DE/LB
2018	David Long Jr.	West Virginia	LB
2019	James Lynch	Baylor	DL
2020	Mike Rose	Iowa State	LB
2021	Jalen Pitre	Baylor	DB
2022	Felix Anudike-Uzomah	Kansas State	DE
2023	T'Vondre Sweat	Texas	DT
2024	Travis Hunter	Colorado	CB/WR
2025	Jacob Rodriguez	Texas Tech	LB

School (Seasons)	Winners	Years
Oklahoma (1996–2024)	7	2000, 2001, 2003, 2006, 2007, 2011, 2017
Texas (1996–2024)	7	2000, 2004, 2006, 2008, 2013, 2017, 2023
Kansas State (1996–present)	5	1999, 2002, 2012, 2016, 2022
Nebraska (1996–2011)	4	1996, 1997, 2009, 2010
Baylor (1996–present)	3	2015, 2019, 2021
Colorado (1996–2011, 2024–present)	2	2007, 2024
Iowa State (1996–present)	2	2011, 2020
TCU (2012–present)	2	2013, 2014
Texas Tech (1996–present)	2	2005, 2025
Kansas (1996–present)	1	2005
Oklahoma State (1996–present)	1	2015
Texas A&M (1996–2012)	1	1998
West Virginia (2012–present)	1	2018

== Special Teams Player of the Year ==
Positions key
PK	Placekicker	KR	Kick returner	P	Punter	PR	Punt returner

Season	Player	School	Position
2005	Mason Crosby	Colorado	PK
2006	Daniel Sepulveda	Baylor	PK
2007	Marcus Herford	Kansas	KR
2008	Dez Bryant	Oklahoma State	PR/KR
2009	Brandon Banks	Kansas State	PR/KR
2010	Dan Bailey	Oklahoma State	PK
2011	Quinn Sharp	Oklahoma State	PK/P
2012	Tavon Austin	West Virginia	KR/PR
2012	Quinn Sharp (2)	Oklahoma State	PK/P
2013	Tyler Lockett	Kansas State	KR
2014	Tyler Lockett (2)	Kansas State	KR
2015	Morgan Burns	Kansas State	KR/PR
2016	Michael Dickson	Texas	P
2017	Michael Dickson (2)	Texas	P
2018	Austin Seibert	Oklahoma	K/P
2019	Joshua Youngblood	Kansas State	KR
2020	Trestan Ebner	Baylor	KR/PR
2021	Trestan Ebner (2)	Baylor	KR/PR
2022	Derius Davis	TCU	KR/PR
2023	Austin McNamara	Texas Tech	P
2024	Will Ferrin	BYU	K
2024	Jaylin Noel	Iowa State	PR/KR
2025	Palmer Williams	Baylor	P

School (Seasons)	Winners	Years
Kansas State (1996–present)	5	2009, 2013, 2014, 2015, 2019
Baylor (1996–present)	4	2006, 2020, 2021, 2025
Oklahoma State (1996–present)	4	2008, 2010, 2011, 2012
Texas (1996–2024)	2	2016, 2017
BYU (2023–present)	1	2024
Colorado (1996–2011, 2024–present)	1	2005
Iowa State (1996–present)	1	2024
Kansas (1996–present)	1	2007
Oklahoma (1996–2024)	1	2018
TCU (2012–present)	1	2022
Texas Tech (1996–present)	1	2023
West Virginia (2012–present)	1	2012

== Offensive Newcomer of the Year ==
Positions key
QB	Quarterback	RB	Running back	WR	Wide receiver	C	Center

Season	Player	School	Position
1996	Scott Frost	Nebraska	QB
1997	Michael Bishop	Kansas State	QB
1998	Mike Moschetti	Colorado	QB
1999	Josh Heupel	Oklahoma	QB
2000	Robert Ferguson	Texas A&M	WR
2001	Seneca Wallace	Iowa State	QB
2002	Bill Whittemore	Kansas	QB
2003	Joe Vaughn	Kansas	C
2004	Adrian Peterson	Oklahoma	RB
2005	Robert Johnson	Texas Tech	WR
2006	Adarius Bowman	Oklahoma State	WR
2007	Deon Murphy	Kansas State	WR
2008	Brandon Banks	Kansas State	WR
2009	Daniel Thomas	Kansas State	RB
2010	Not awarded		
2011	Aaron Horne	Iowa State	WR
2012	Lache Seastrunk	Baylor	RB
2013	Charles Sims	West Virginia	RB
2014	Tyreek Hill	Oklahoma State	RB
2015	Dede Westbrook	Oklahoma	WR
2016	Justin Crawford	West Virginia	RB
2017	Will Grier	West Virginia	QB
2018	Jalen Hurd	Baylor	WR
2019	Jalen Hurts	Oklahoma	QB
2020	Xavier Hutchinson	Iowa State	WR
2021	Jaylen Warren	Oklahoma State	RB
2022	Dillon Gabriel	Oklahoma	QB
2023	Adonai Mitchell	Texas	WR
2024	Jordyn Tyson	Arizona State	WR
2025	Devon Dampier	Utah	QB

School (Seasons)	Winners	Years
Oklahoma (1996–2024)	5	1999, 2004, 2015, 2019, 2022
Kansas State (1996–present)	4	1997, 2007, 2008, 2009
Iowa State (1996–present)	3	2001, 2011, 2020
Oklahoma State (1996–present)	3	2006, 2014, 2021
West Virginia (2012–present)	3	2013, 2016, 2017
Baylor (1996–present)	2	2012, 2018
Kansas (1996–present)	2	2002, 2003
Arizona State (2024–present)	1	2024
Colorado (1996–2011, 2024–present)	1	1998
Nebraska (1996–2011)	1	1996
Texas (1996–2024)	1	2023
Texas A&M (1996–2012)	1	2000
Texas Tech (1996–present)	1	2005
Utah (2024–present)	1	2025

== Defensive Newcomer of the Year ==
Positions key
CB	Cornerback	DB	Defensive back	DE	Defensive end	DL	Defensive line
DT	Defensive tackle	LB	Linebacker	S	Safety		

Season	Player	School	Position
1996	Gana Joseph	Oklahoma	DB
1997	Jeff Kelly	Kansas State	LB
1998	Jess Beckom	Iowa State	LB
1999	Mario Fatafehi	Kansas State	DL
2000	Derrick Yates	Kansas State	DB
2001	Tank Reese	Kansas State	DL
2002	Lance Mitchell	Oklahoma	LB
2003	Donte Nicholson	Oklahoma	DB
2004	Tim Dobbins	Iowa State	LB
2005	C. J. Ah You	Oklahoma	DL
2006	Misi Tupe	Texas A&M	LB
2007	Gary Chandler	Kansas State	DB
2008	McKinner Dixon	Texas Tech	DE
2009	David Sims	Iowa State	DB
2010	Lavonte David	Nebraska	LB
2011	Arthur Brown	Kansas State	LB
2012	Calvin Barnett	Oklahoma State	DT
2013	Isaiah Johnson	Kansas	S
2014	Shaq Riddick	West Virginia	DE
2015	Demond Tucker	Iowa State	DL
2016	D. J. Reed	Kansas State	DB
2017	Ben Banogu	TCU	DE
2018	Greg Eisworth	Iowa State	DB
2019	LaRon Stokes	Oklahoma	DL
2020	Tony Fields II	West Virginia	LB
2021	Siaki Ika	Baylor	DL
2022	Johnny Hodges	TCU	LB
2023	Austin Booker	Kansas	DL
2024	BJ Green II	Colorado	DE
2025	David Bailey	Texas Tech	DE

School (Seasons)	Winners	Years
Kansas State (1996–present)	7	1997, 1999, 2000, 2001, 2007, 2011, 2016
Iowa State (1996–present)	5	1998, 2004, 2009, 2015, 2018
Oklahoma (1996–2024)	5	1996, 2002, 2003, 2005, 2019
Kansas (1996–present)	2	2013, 2023
TCU (2012–present)	2	2017, 2022
Texas Tech (1996–present)	2	2008, 2025
West Virginia (2012–present)	2	2014, 2020
Baylor (1996–present)	1	2021
Colorado (1996–2011, 2024–present)	1	2024
Nebraska (1996–2011)	1	2010
Oklahoma State (1996–present)	1	2012
Texas A&M (1996–2012)	1	2006

== Offensive Freshman of the Year ==
Positions key
QB	Quarterback	RB	Running back	WR	Wide receiver	C	Center

Season	Player	School	Position
1996	De'mond Parker	Oklahoma	RB
1997	Tony Lindsay	Oklahoma State	QB
1998	Major Applewhite	Texas	QB
1999	Shaud Williams	Texas Tech	RB
2000	Roy Williams	Texas	WR
2001	Cedric Benson	Texas	RB
2002	Brad Smith	Missouri	QB
2003	Vince Young	Texas	QB
2004	Adrian Peterson	Oklahoma	RB
2005	Jamaal Charles	Texas	RB
2006	Colt McCoy	Texas	QB
2007	Michael Crabtree	Texas Tech	WR
2007	Jeremy Maclin	Missouri	WR
2008	Robert Griffin III	Baylor	QB
2009	Christine Michael	Texas A&M	RB
2010	Taylor Martinez	Nebraska	QB
2011	Tyler Lockett	Kansas State	WR/KR
2012	J. W. Walsh	Oklahoma State	QB
2013	Baker Mayfield	Texas Tech	QB
2014	Samaje Perine	Oklahoma	RB
2015	Mike Warren	Iowa State	RB
2016	Justice Hill	Oklahoma State	RB
2017	Charlie Brewer	Baylor	QB
2017	Jalen Reagor	TCU	WR
2018	Pooka Williams Jr.	Kansas	RB
2019	Spencer Sanders	Oklahoma State	QB
2020	Deuce Vaughn	Kansas State	RB
2021	Xavier Worthy	Texas	WR
2022	Richard Reese	Baylor	RB
2023	Rocco Becht	Iowa State	QB
2024	Sam Leavitt	Arizona State	QB
2025	Bear Bachmeier	BYU	QB

School (Seasons)	Winners	Years
Texas (1996–2024)	7	1998, 2000, 2001, 2003, 2005, 2006, 2021
Oklahoma State (1996–present)	4	1997, 2012, 2016, 2019
Baylor (1996–present)	3	2008, 2017, 2022
Oklahoma (1996–2024)	3	1996, 2004, 2014
Texas Tech (1996–present)	3	1999, 2007, 2013
Iowa State (1996–present)	2	2015, 2023
Kansas State (1996–present)	2	2011, 2020
Missouri (1996–2012)	2	2002, 2007
Arizona State (2024–present)	1	2024
BYU (2023–present)	1	2025
Kansas (1996–present)	1	2018
Nebraska (1996–2011)	1	2010
TCU (2012–present)	1	2017
Texas A&M (1996–2012)	1	2009

== Defensive Freshman of the Year ==
Positions key
CB	Cornerback	DB	Defensive back	DE	Defensive end	DL	Defensive line
DT	Defensive tackle	LB	Linebacker	S	Safety		

Season	Player	School	Position
1996	Mark Simoneau	Kansas State	LB
1997	Ben Kelly	Colorado	DB
1998	Justin Smith	Missouri	DE
1999	Cory Redding	Texas	DL
2000	Terry Pierce	Kansas State	LB
2001	Tommie Harris	Oklahoma	DL
2001	Derrick Johnson	Texas	LB
2002	Rodrique Wright	Texas	DL
2003	Jason Berryman	Iowa State	DL
2004	Jordon Dizon	Colorado	LB
2005	Brian Orakpo	Texas	DL
2006	Andre Sexton	Oklahoma State	S
2007	Gerald McCoy	Oklahoma	DT
2008	Travis Lewis	Oklahoma	LB
2009	Aldon Smith	Missouri	DE
2010	Tony Jefferson	Oklahoma	DB
2010	Shaun Lewis	Oklahoma State	LB
2011	Quandre Diggs	Texas	DB
2012	Devonte Fields	TCU	DE
2013	Dominique Alexander	Oklahoma	LB
2014	Kamari Cotton-Moya	Iowa State	DB
2015	Malik Jefferson	Texas	LB
2016	Reggie Walker	Kansas State	DE
2017	Ross Blacklock	TCU	DT
2017	Kenneth Murray	Oklahoma	LB
2018	Caden Sterns	Texas	DB
2019	Ar'Darius Washington	TCU	DB
2020	Khari Coleman	TCU	DL
2020	Isheem Young	Iowa State	S
2021	Collin Oliver	Oklahoma State	DE
2022	Kendal Daniels	Oklahoma State	S
2023	Ben Roberts	Texas Tech	LB
2024	Josiah Trotter	West Virginia	LB
2025	Wendell Gregory	Oklahoma State	LB

School (Seasons)	Winners	Years
Texas (1996–2024)	7	1999, 2001, 2002, 2005, 2011, 2015, 2018
Oklahoma (1996–2024)	6	2001, 2007, 2008, 2010, 2013, 2017
Oklahoma State (1996–present)	5	2006, 2010, 2021, 2022, 2025
TCU (2012–present)	4	2012, 2017, 2019, 2020
Iowa State (1996–present)	3	2003, 2014, 2020
Kansas State (1996–present)	3	1996, 2000, 2016
Colorado (1996–2011, 2024–present)	2	1997, 2004
Missouri (1996–2012)	2	1998, 2009
Texas Tech (1996–present)	1	2023
West Virginia (2012–present)	1	2024

== Offensive Lineman of the Year ==
Positions key
C	Center	G	Offensive guard	T	Offensive tackle

Season	Player	School	Position
2006	Justin Blalock	Texas	T
2007	Adam Spieker	Missouri	C
2007	Cody Wallace	Texas A&M	C
2008	Jon Cooper	Oklahoma	C
2009	Russell Okung	Oklahoma State	T
2010	Nate Solder	Colorado	T
2011	Grant Garner	Oklahoma State	C
2012	Cyril Richardson	Baylor	G
2013	Cyril Richardson (2)	Baylor	G
2014	Spencer Drango	Baylor	T
2014	B. J. Finney	Kansas State	C
2015	Spencer Drango (2)	Baylor	T
2016	Orlando Brown Jr.	Oklahoma	T
2017	Orlando Brown Jr. (2)	Oklahoma	T
2018	Yodny Cajuste	West Virginia	T
2018	Dalton Risner	Kansas State	T
2018	Dru Samia	Oklahoma	G
2019	Creed Humphrey	Oklahoma	C
2019	Colton McKivitz	West Virginia	T
2020	Creed Humphrey (2)	Oklahoma	C
2021	Connor Galvin	Baylor	T
2022	Cooper Beebe	Kansas State	G
2023	Cooper Beebe (2)	Kansas State	G
2024	Wyatt Milum	West Virginia	T
2025	Spencer Fano	Utah	T

School (Seasons)	Winners	Years
Oklahoma (1996–2024)	6	2008, 2016, 2017, 2018, 2019, 2020
Baylor (1996–present)	5	2012, 2013, 2014, 2015, 2021
Kansas State (1996–present)	4	2014, 2018, 2022, 2023
West Virginia (2012–present)	3	2018, 2019, 2024
Oklahoma State (1996–present)	2	2009, 2011
Colorado (1996–2011, 2024–present)	1	2010
Missouri (1996–2012)	1	2007
Texas (1996–2024)	1	2006
Texas A&M (1996–2012)	1	2007
Utah (2024–present)	1	2025

== Defensive Lineman of the Year ==
Positions key
DE	Defensive end	DT	Defensive tackle

Season	Player	School	Position
2006	Adam Carriker	Nebraska	DE
2007	James McClinton	Kansas	DT
2008	Brian Orakpo	Texas	DE
2009	Ndamukong Suh	Nebraska	DT
2010	Jeremy Beal	Oklahoma	DE
2011	Frank Alexander	Oklahoma	DE
2012	Meshak Williams	Kansas State	DE
2013	Ryan Mueller	Kansas State	DE
2014	Emmanuel Ogbah	Oklahoma State	DE
2015	Andrew Billings	Baylor	DT
2016	Jordan Willis	Kansas State	DE
2017	Poona Ford	Texas	DT
2018	Charles Omenihu	Texas	DE
2019	James Lynch	Baylor	DT
2020	Darius Stills	West Virginia	DT
2021	Felix Anudike-Uzomah	Kansas State	DE
2021	Will McDonald IV	Iowa State	DE
2022	Felix Anudike-Uzomah (2)	Kansas State	DE
2023	Byron Murphy II	Texas	DT
2024	Brendan Mott	Kansas State	DE
2025	David Bailey	Texas Tech	DE

School (Seasons)	Winners	Years
Kansas State (1996–present)	6	2012, 2013, 2016, 2021, 2022, 2024
Texas (1996–2024)	4	2008, 2017, 2018, 2023
Baylor (1996–present)	2	2015, 2019
Nebraska (1996–2011)	2	2006, 2009
Oklahoma (1996–2024)	2	2010, 2011
Iowa State (1996–present)	1	2021
Kansas (1996–present)	1	2007
Oklahoma State (1996–present)	1	2014
Texas Tech (1996–present)	1	2025
West Virginia (2012–present)	1	2020

== Coach of the Year ==
Season	Player	School	Record
1996	Spike Dykes	Texas Tech	7–5
1997	Bob Simmons	Oklahoma State	8–4
1998	Bill Snyder	Kansas State	11–2
1999	Frank Solich	Nebraska	12–1
2000	Bob Stoops	Oklahoma	13–0
2001	Frank Solich (2)	Nebraska	11–2
2002	Bill Snyder (2)	Kansas State	11–2
2003	Bob Stoops (2)	Oklahoma	12–2
2004	Dan McCarney	Iowa State	7–5
2005	Mack Brown	Texas	13–0
2006	Bob Stoops (3)	Oklahoma	11–3
2007	Mark Mangino	Kansas	12–1
2008	Mike Leach	Texas Tech	11–2
2008	Bob Stoops (4)	Oklahoma	12–2
2009	Mack Brown (2)	Texas	13–1
2010	Mike Gundy	Oklahoma State	11–2
2011	Bill Snyder (3)	Kansas State	10–3
2012	Bill Snyder (4)	Kansas State	11–2
2013	Art Briles	Baylor	11–2
2014	Gary Patterson	TCU	12–1
2015	Bob Stoops (5)	Oklahoma	11–2
2016	Bob Stoops (6)	Oklahoma	11–2
2017	Matt Campbell	Iowa State	8–5
2018	Matt Campbell (2)	Iowa State	8–5
2018	Lincoln Riley	Oklahoma	12–2
2019	Matt Rhule	Baylor	11–3
2020	Matt Campbell (3)	Iowa State	9–5
2021	Mike Gundy (2)	Oklahoma State	12–2
2022	Sonny Dykes	TCU	13–2
2023	Mike Gundy (3)	Oklahoma State	10–4
2024	Kenny Dillingham	Arizona State	11–3
2025	Kalani Sitake	BYU	12–2

School (Seasons)	Winners	Years
Oklahoma (1996–2024)	7	2000, 2003, 2006, 2008, 2015, 2016, 2018
Iowa State (1996–present)	4	2004, 2017, 2018, 2020
Kansas State (1996–present)	4	1998, 2002, 2011, 2012
Oklahoma State (1996–present)	4	1997, 2010, 2021, 2023
Baylor (1996–present)	2	2013, 2019
Nebraska (1996–2011)	2	1999, 2001
TCU (2012–present)	2	2014, 2022
Texas (1996–2024)	2	2005, 2009
Texas Tech (1996–present)	2	1996, 2008
Arizona State (2024–present)	1	2024
BYU (2023–present)	1	2025
Kansas (1996–present)	1	2007
