= David Long Jr. (linebacker) =

American football player (born 1996)

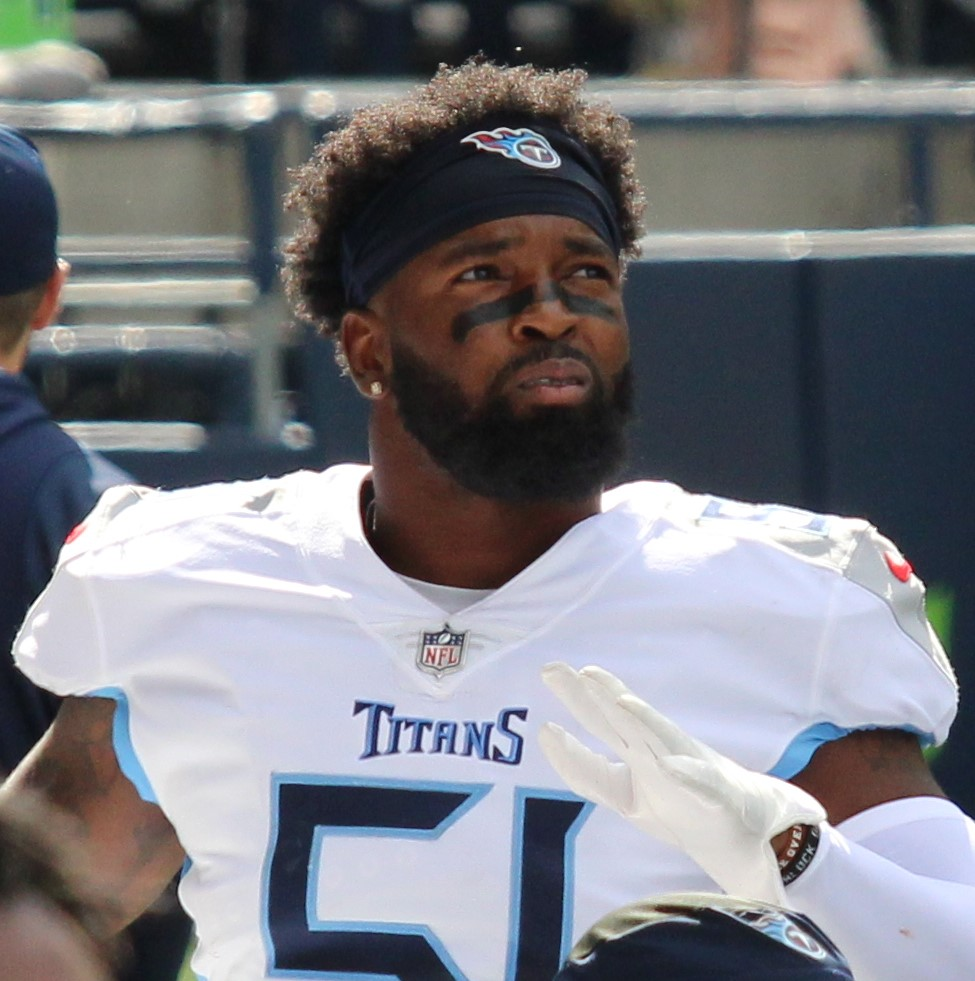
- Long with the Tennessee Titans in 2021

Profile
- Position: Linebacker

Personal information
- Born: October 12, 1996 (age 30); Cincinnati, Ohio, U.S.
- Listed height: 5 ft 11 in (1.80 m)
- Listed weight: 225 lb (102 kg)

Career information
- High school: Winton Woods (Cincinnati, Ohio)
- College: West Virginia (2015–2018)
- NFL draft: 2019: 6th round, 188th overall pick

Career history
- Tennessee Titans (2019–2022); Miami Dolphins (2023–2024); Detroit Lions (2024); Tennessee Titans (2024)

Awards and highlights
- 2× Second-team All-American (2017, 2018); Big 12 Defensive Player of the Year (2018); 2× First-team All-Big 12 (2017, 2018)

Career NFL statistics as of 2024
- Total tackles: 388
- Sacks: 1
- Forced fumbles: 3
- Fumble recoveries: 1
- Pass deflections: 15
- Interceptions: 4
- Stats at Pro Football Reference

David Lamont Long Jr. (born October 12, 1996) is an American professional football linebacker. He played college football for the West Virginia Mountaineers and was selected by the Tennessee Titans in the sixth round of the 2019 NFL draft. Long has also played for the Miami Dolphins and Detroit Lions.

== Early life ==
When Long was seven years old, he was on the back of a bike being pedaled by his older brother when he was hit by a car driven by someone who was not paying attention. Long was treated at the hospital with head and arm injuries. He attended Winton Woods High School in Cincinnati and finished his career with 283 career tackles, six sacks, and six interceptions. Long was a high school teammate of safety Mike Edwards, who was selected by the Tampa Bay Buccaneers in the third round of the 2019 NFL draft.

== College career ==
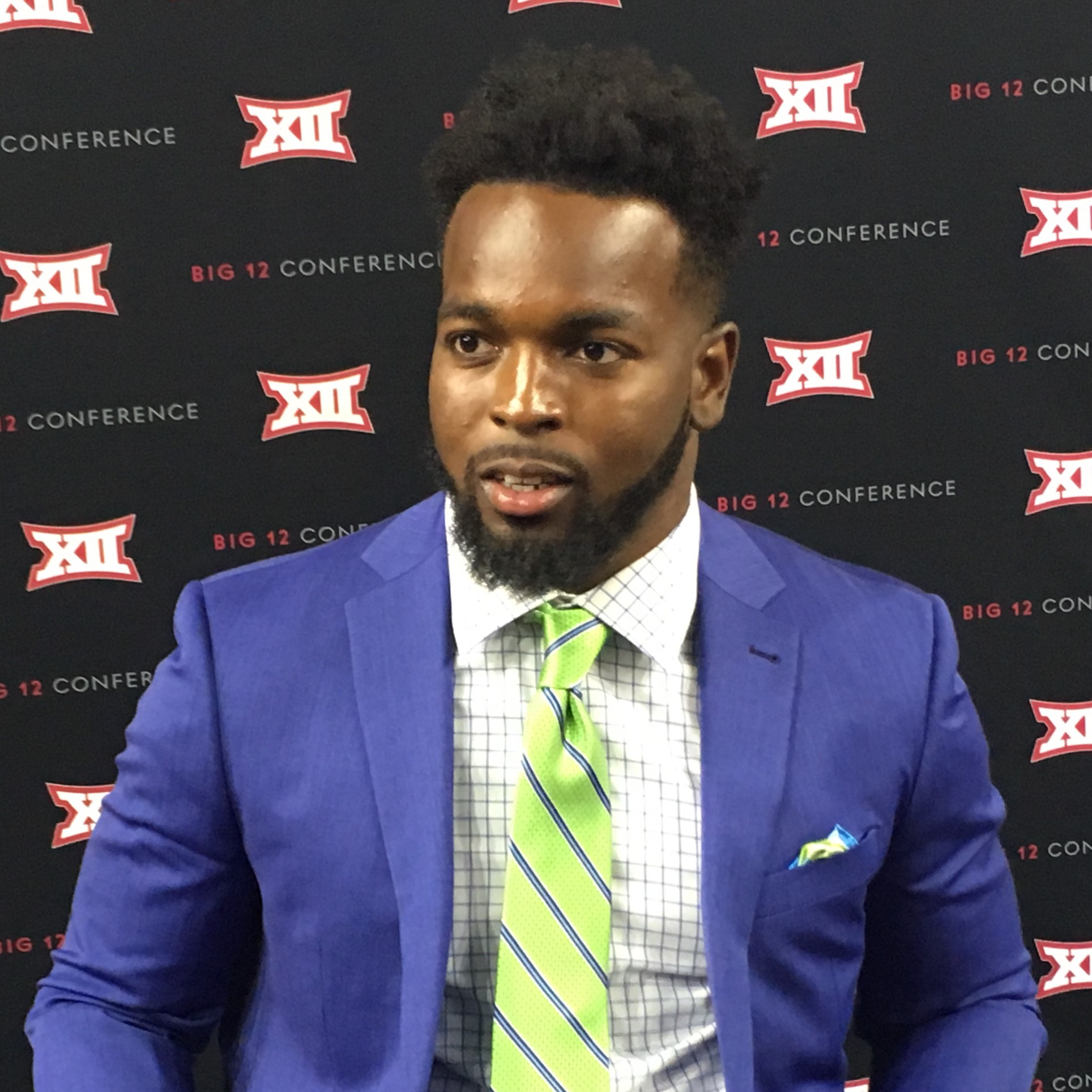
Long at 2018 Big 12 Media Days

Long redshirted in 2015 and made his collegiate debut as a redshirt freshman for the 2016 team in the season-opener against Missouri on September 3 with four tackles as a reserve.

Long missed the first month of the season due to a summer knee injury. As a redshirt sophomore for the 2017 Mountaineers, his best statistics were his 18-tackle (including a school record 7 for a loss (meaning the offense lost yardage as a result of his tackle)) effort against the Oklahoma State Cowboys on October 28 and his 2.5-quarterback sack performance in the December 26, 2017 Heart of Dallas Bowl against the Utah Utes.

Among his best games as a redshirt junior for the 2018 team were his 15-tackle (3 for a loss) effort against Texas Tech on September 29 and his 3-sack performance on November 10 against TCU. That season, he was named as a 2018 first-team All-Big 12 Conference selection and as the Big 12 Defensive Player of the Year, after leading the Big 12 in tackles for a loss. Long is the second Mountaineer to be named a conference defensive MVP (Canute Curtis, 1996 Big East), and first since the Mountaineers joined the Big 12. Long earned 2018 College Football All-America Team second-team recognition by the Walter Camp Football Foundation, and the Associated Press. On December 30, 2018, Long announced that he would forgo his final year of eligibility and declare for the 2019 NFL draft.

== Professional career ==
Pre-draft measurables
Height	Weight	Arm length	Hand span	Wingspan	40-yard dash	10-yard split	20-yard split	20-yard shuttle	Three-cone drill	Vertical jump	Broad jump	Bench press
5 ft 11 1/4 in (1.81 m)	227 lb (103 kg)	30 3/4 in (0.78 m)	10 in (0.25 m)	6 ft 3 1/2 in (1.92 m)	4.81 s	1.65 s	2.78 s	4.27 s	6.88 s	31.0 in (0.79 m)	9 ft 3 in (2.82 m)	18 reps
All values from NFL Combine/Pro Day

=== Tennessee Titans (first stint) ===
Long was selected by the Tennessee Titans in the sixth round (188th overall) of the 2019 NFL draft. During Week 10 against the Kansas City Chiefs, Long forced a fumble off running back Damien Williams which was recovered by teammate Rashaan Evans for a 53-yard touchdown in the 35–32 victory. He finished his rookie year with 15 tackles as a backup linebacker and special teamer.

Long played 14 games in 2020 and made five starts at the end of the season, recording 54 tackles and a forced fumble. He was placed on the reserve/COVID-19 list by the team on November 16, 2020, and activated on November 28.

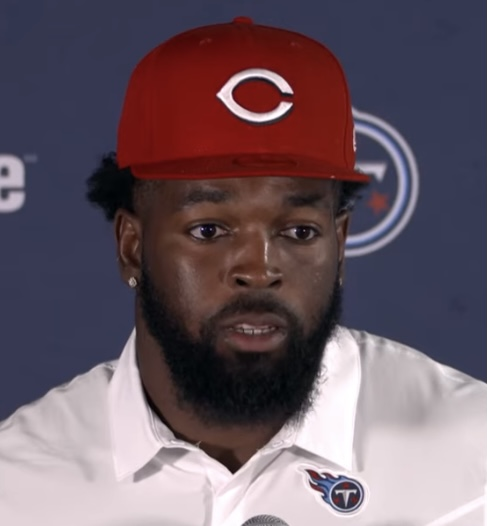
Long in 2021

Long entered the 2021 season as the starting linebacker for the Titans, playing only 10 games due to injuries. He recorded 75 tackles and two interceptions.

Long continued the 2022 season as a starter for the Titans. He suffered a hamstring injury in Week 13 and was placed on injured reserve on December 10, 2022. He finished the season with 86 tackles and two interceptions.

=== Miami Dolphins ===
On March 17, 2023, Long signed a two-year, $11 million contract with the Miami Dolphins. He started all 17 games for the Dolphins in 2023, recording a career-high and team-leading 113 tackles.

Long returned as a starter for six games in 2024, but lost his starting job in Week 8, only playing on special teams for two more games before being released on November 13, 2024. He made 38 tackles during his season with the Dolphins.

=== Detroit Lions ===
On November 18, 2024, Long was signed to the Detroit Lions' practice squad. He was promoted to the active roster nine days later. Long played five games with the Lions in 2024, making seven tackles and a fumble recovery. He was released on December 24.

=== Tennessee Titans (second stint) ===
On December 25, 2024, Long was claimed off waivers by the Titans. However, he was waived the next day after a failed physical.

== NFL career statistics ==
=== Regular season ===
Year	Team	Games		Tackles					Fumbles				Interceptions					
Year	Team	GP	GS	Comb	Solo	Ast	Sk	TFL	FF	FR	Yds	TD	Int	Yds	Avg	Lng	TD	PD
2019	TEN	14	0	15	9	6	0.0	2	1	0	0	0	0	0	0.0	0	0	1
2020	TEN	14	5	54	30	24	0.0	2	1	0	0	0	0	0	0.0	0	0	2
2021	TEN	10	9	75	46	29	0.0	4	0	0	0	0	2	6	3.0	6	0	6
2022	TEN	12	12	86	52	34	0.0	7	0	0	0	0	2	4	2.0	4	0	5
2023	MIA	17	17	113	64	49	1.0	9	1	0	0	0	0	0	0.0	0	0	1
2024	MIA	8	6	38	26	12	0.0	2	0	0	0	0	0	0	0.0	0	0	0
2024	DET	5	1	7	3	4	0.0	1	0	1	0	0	0	0	0.0	0	0	0
Career		80	50	388	230	158	1.0	27	3	1	0	0	4	10	2.5	6	0	15

=== Postseason ===
Year	Team	Games		Tackles					Fumbles				Interceptions					
Year	Team	GP	GS	Comb	Total	Ast	Sk	TFL	FF	FR	Yds	TD	Int	Yds	Avg	Lng	TD	PD
2019	TEN	3	1	13	10	3	0.0	0	0	0	0	0	0	0.0	0	0	0	0
2020	TEN	1	1	5	4	1	0.0	0	0	0	0	0	0	0.0	0	0	0	0
2021	TEN	1	1	8	6	2	1.0	1	0	0	0	0	0	0.0	0	0	0	0
Career		5	3	26	20	6	1.0	1	0	0	0	0	0	0.0	0	0	0	0

== Personal life ==
Long is the son of David and Deon Long. He is one of 12 children. David's father, David Sr., is a former professional boxer who once fought future world champ Deontay Wilder and went 12-5-2 as a heavyweight.
