= 2018 TCU Horned Frogs football team =

American college football season

2018 TCU Horned Frogs football

Cheez-It Bowl champion

Cheez-It Bowl, W 10–7 ^{OT} vs. California
- Conference: Big 12 Conference
- Record: 7–6 (4–5 Big 12)
- Head coach: Gary Patterson (18th season)
- Co-offensive coordinators: Sonny Cumbie (5th season); Curtis Luper (2nd season)
- Offensive scheme: Spread
- Defensive coordinator: Chad Glasgow (4th season)
- Base defense: 4–2–5
- Home stadium: Amon G. Carter Stadium

2018 Big 12 Conference football standings
	Conf.			Overall
Team	W		L	W		L
No. 4 Oklahoma y$^	8	–	1	12	–	2
No. 9 Texas y	7	–	2	10	–	4
Iowa State	6	–	3	8	–	5
No. 20 West Virginia	6	–	3	8	–	4
TCU	4	–	5	7	–	6
Baylor	4	–	5	7	–	6
Oklahoma State	3	–	6	7	–	6
Kansas State	3	–	6	5	–	7
Texas Tech	3	–	6	5	–	7
Kansas	1	–	8	3	–	9
Championship: Oklahoma 39, Texas 27
^ – College Football Playoff participant; $ – Conference champion; y – Championship game participant; Rankings from AP Poll

The 2018 TCU Horned Frogs football team represented Texas Christian University in the 2018 NCAA Division I FBS football season. The 123rd TCU football team played as a member of the Big 12 Conference and played their home games at Amon G. Carter Stadium, on the TCU campus in Fort Worth, Texas. They were led by 18th-year head coach Gary Patterson. They finished the season 7–6, 4–5 in Big 12 play to finish in a tie for fifth place. They were invited to the Cheez-It Bowl where they defeated California.

== Recruiting ==
=== Position key ===
Back	B	Center	C	Cornerback	CB	Defensive back	DB
Defensive end	DE	Defensive lineman	DL	Defensive tackle	DT	End	E
Fullback	FB	Guard	G	Halfback	HB	Kicker	K
Kickoff returner	KR	Offensive tackle	OT	Offensive lineman	OL	Linebacker	LB
Long snapper	LS	Punter	P	Punt returner	PR	Quarterback	QB
Running back	RB	Safety	S	Tight end	TE	Wide receiver	WR

=== Recruits ===
The Horned Frogs signed a total of 22 recruits.

College recruiting (2018)
Name	Hometown	School	Height	Weight	Commit date
Ochaun Mathis; DE	Manor, TX	Manor High School	6 ft 5 in (1.96 m)	235 lb (107 kg)	Jan 29, 2017
Ochaun Mathis; DE	Recruit ratings: Scout: Rivals: 247Sports: ESPN:				
Esteban Avila; OG	Grand Prairie, TX	South Grand Prairie High School	6 ft 4 in (1.93 m)	308 lb (140 kg)	Mar 7, 2017
Esteban Avila; OG	Recruit ratings: Scout: Rivals: 247Sports: ESPN:				
Atanza Vongor; S	Grand Prairie, TX	South Grand Prairie High School	6 ft 1 in (1.85 m)	200 lb (91 kg)	Mar 11, 2017
Atanza Vongor; S	Recruit ratings: Scout: Rivals: 247Sports: ESPN:				
Trevon Moehrig; CB	Spring Branch, TX	Smithson Valley High School	6 ft 2 in (1.88 m)	190 lb (86 kg)	Apr 12, 2017
Trevon Moehrig; CB	Recruit ratings: Scout: Rivals: 247Sports: ESPN:				
John Lanz; C	Denton, TX	Guyer High School	6 ft 3 in (1.91 m)	295 lb (134 kg)	May 5, 2017
John Lanz; C	Recruit ratings: Scout: Rivals: 247Sports: ESPN:				
Justin Rogers; QB	Bossier City, LA	Parkway High School	6 ft 4 in (1.93 m)	210 lb (95 kg)	May 31, 2017
Justin Rogers; QB	Recruit ratings: Scout: Rivals: 247Sports: ESPN:				
Hidari Ceasar; S	Richwood, LA	Richwood High School	5 ft 11 in (1.80 m)	175 lb (79 kg)	Jun 7, 2017
Hidari Ceasar; S	Recruit ratings: Scout: Rivals: 247Sports: ESPN:				
John Stephens; WR	Logansport, LA	Logansport High School	6 ft 4 in (1.93 m)	206 lb (93 kg)	Jun 15, 2017
John Stephens; WR	Recruit ratings: Scout: Rivals: 247Sports: ESPN:				
Chase Van Wagoner; WR	Allen, TX	Lovejoy High School	6 ft 1 in (1.85 m)	180 lb (82 kg)	Jun 17, 2017
Chase Van Wagoner; WR	Recruit ratings: Scout: Rivals: 247Sports: ESPN:				
Kris Dike; OT	Van, TX	Van High School	6 ft 6 in (1.98 m)	290 lb (130 kg)	Jun 17, 2017
Kris Dike; OT	Recruit ratings: Scout: Rivals: 247Sports: ESPN:				
Ben Wilson; LB	Sumner, WA	Sumner High School	6 ft 2 in (1.88 m)	220 lb (100 kg)	Jun 23, 2017
Ben Wilson; LB	Recruit ratings: Scout: Rivals: 247Sports: ESPN:				
Anthony McKinney; OT	Rockford, IL	Iowa Western Community College	6 ft 8 in (2.03 m)	330 lb (150 kg)	Jul 13, 2017
Anthony McKinney; OT	Recruit ratings: Scout: Rivals: 247Sports: ESPN:				
Derius Davis; CB	St. Francisville, LA	West Feliciana High School	5 ft 9 in (1.75 m)	160 lb (73 kg)	Jul 28, 2017
Derius Davis; CB	Recruit ratings: Scout: Rivals: 247Sports: ESPN:				
Taye Barber; WR	Cypress, TX	Cy Springs High School	5 ft 9 in (1.75 m)	185 lb (84 kg)	Jul 30, 2017
Taye Barber; WR	Recruit ratings: Scout: Rivals: 247Sports: ESPN:				
Tevailance Hunt; WR	Texarkana, TX	Texas High School	6 ft 2 in (1.88 m)	185 lb (84 kg)	Aug 4, 2017
Tevailance Hunt; WR	Recruit ratings: Scout: Rivals: 247Sports: ESPN:				
Bryson Jackson; WR	Houston, TX	Kingwood Park High School	6 ft 0 in (1.83 m)	182 lb (83 kg)	Sep 15, 2017
Bryson Jackson; WR	Recruit ratings: Scout: Rivals: 247Sports: ESPN:				
Ian Burnette; OG	Wimberley, TX	Wimberley High School	6 ft 4 in (1.93 m)	295 lb (134 kg)	Oct 1, 2017
Ian Burnette; OG	Recruit ratings: Scout: Rivals: 247Sports: ESPN:				
Pro Wells; TE	St. Petersburg, FL	Northwest Mississippi Community College	6 ft 4 in (1.93 m)	235 lb (107 kg)	Dec 3, 2017
Pro Wells; TE	Recruit ratings: Scout: Rivals: 247Sports: ESPN:				
Fabian Franklin; RB	Hattiesburg, MS	Hattiesburg High School	5 ft 11 in (1.80 m)	207 lb (94 kg)	Dec 11, 2017
Fabian Franklin; RB	Recruit ratings: Scout: Rivals: 247Sports: ESPN:				
Izaih Filikitonga; DE	Euless, TX	Trinity High School	6 ft 2 in (1.88 m)	270 lb (120 kg)	Jan 20, 2018
Izaih Filikitonga; DE	Recruit ratings: Scout: Rivals: 247Sports: ESPN:				
Jacoby Simpson; LB	Houston, TX	MacArthur High School	6 ft 0 in (1.83 m)	225 lb (102 kg)	Feb 5, 2018
Jacoby Simpson; LB	Recruit ratings: Scout: Rivals: 247Sports: ESPN:				
Ar'Darius Washington; CB	Shreveport, LA	Evangel Christian Academy	5 ft 8 in (1.73 m)	175 lb (79 kg)	Feb 6, 2018
Ar'Darius Washington; CB	Recruit ratings: Scout: Rivals: 247Sports: ESPN:				
Overall recruit ranking:
Note: In many cases, Scout, Rivals, 247Sports, On3, and ESPN may conflict in their listings of height and weight.; In these cases, the average was taken. ESPN grades are on a 100-point scale.; Sources: "TCU Football Commitments". Rivals.; "2018 Team Ranking". Rivals.com.

== Preseason ==
=== Award watch lists ===
Listed in the order that they were released

Award	Player	Position	Year
Lott Trophy	Ty Summers	LB	SR
Chuck Bednarik Award	Ben Banogu	DE	SR
Chuck Bednarik Award	Ty Summers	LB	SR
Maxwell Award	Darius Anderson	RB	JR
Doak Walker Award	Darius Anderson	RB	JR
Butkus Award	Ty Summers	LB	SR
Bronko Nagurski Trophy	Ben Banogu	DE	SR
Ray Guy Award	Adam Nunez	P	JR
Paul Hornung Award	KaVontae Turpin	WR	SR
Wuerffel Trophy	Ben Banogu	DE	SR
Walter Camp Award	Ben Banogu	DE	SR
Walter Camp Award	Darius Anderson	RB	JR
Ted Hendricks Award	Ben Banogu	DE	SR
Earl Campbell Tyler Rose Award	Darius Anderson	RB	JR
Earl Campbell Tyler Rose Award	Jalen Reagor	WR	SO

=== Big 12 media poll ===
The Big 12 media poll was released on July 12, 2018 with the Horned Frogs predicted to finish in third place.

== Schedule ==
Date	Time	Opponent	Rank	Site	TV	Result	Attendance
September 1	11:00 a.m.	Southern*	No. 16	Amon G. Carter Stadium; Fort Worth, TX	FSN	W 55–7	42,219
September 7	7:00 p.m.	at SMU*	No. 16	Gerald J. Ford Stadium; University Park, TX (rivalry)	ESPN2	W 42–12	24,216
September 15	7:00 p.m.	vs. No. 4 Ohio State*	No. 15	AT&T Stadium; Arlington, TX (Advocare Cowboys Showdown; College GameDay)	ABC	L 28–40	64,362
September 22	3:30 p.m.	at Texas	No. 17	Darrell K Royal-Texas Memorial Stadium; Austin, TX (rivalry)	FOX	L 16–31	100,321
September 29	6:00 p.m.	Iowa State		Amon G. Carter Stadium; Fort Worth, TX	ESPNU	W 17–14	42,664
October 11	6:30 p.m.	Texas Tech		Amon G. Carter Stadium; Fort Worth, TX (rivalry)	ESPN	L 14–17	44,387
October 20	11:00 a.m.	No. 9 Oklahoma		Amon G. Carter Stadium; Fort Worth, TX	ABC	L 27–52	45,055
October 27	2:00 p.m.	at Kansas		David Booth Kansas Memorial Stadium; Lawrence, KS	FS1	L 26–27	15,069
November 3	2:30 p.m.	Kansas State		Amon G. Carter Stadium; Fort Worth, TX	FS1	W 14–13	40,486
November 10	11:00 a.m.	at No. 7 West Virginia		Mountaineer Field; Morgantown, WV	FS1	L 10–47	60,007
November 17	11:00 a.m.	at Baylor		McLane Stadium; Waco, TX (rivalry)	FS1	W 16–9	45,140
November 24	7:00 p.m.	Oklahoma State		Amon G. Carter Stadium; Fort Worth, TX	FOX	W 31–24	42,394
December 26	8:00 p.m.	vs. California*		Chase Field; Phoenix, AZ (Cheez-It Bowl)	ESPN	W 10–7 ^{OT}	33,121
*Non-conference game; Rankings from AP Poll released prior to the game; All times are in Central time

Schedule Source:

== Personnel ==
=== Roster ===
2018 TCU Horned Frogs football team roster
Players
Coaches
Offense

Pos.	#	Name	Class
WR	1	Jalen Reagor	So
WR	2	Jaelan Austin	Sr
WR	4	Taye Barber	Fr
RB	6	Darius Anderson	Jr
WR	7	John Stephens Jr.	Fr
WR	9	Te'Vailance Hunt	Fr
QB	10	Mike Collins	So
WR	11	Dylan Thomas	Jr
WR	12	Derius Davis	Fr
QB	13	Justin Rogers	Fr
WR	14	Chase Van Wagoner	Fr
QB	15	Karson Ringdahl	So
QB	17	Grayson Muehlstein	Sr
WR	18	Bryson Jackson	Fr
QB	19	Grant Beucler	Fr
WR	19	Ni'Jeel Meeking	Fr
RB	21	Emari Demercado	So
WR	22	Jarrison Stewart	Sr
WR	27	Jack Heathcott	So
WR	28	Patrick Zeller	Sr
RB	30	Omega Stallworth	So
WR	31	Michael Byrd Jr.	So
RB	33	Sewo Olonilua	Jr
WR	35	Jack Powers	Fr
WR	37	Niven Raj	So
TE	39	Jacques Guillot	Sr
TE	47	Carter Ware	Fr
RB	48	Reggie Cole	Fr
OT	51	Quazzel White	Fr
G	52	Trey Elliott	Sr
C	53	John Lanz	Fr
C	55	Kellton Hollins	So
OT	56	Austin Myers	So
G	60	Nate Guyton	Jr
G	62	David Bolisomi	Jr
C	65	Colson Altman	So
G	66	Ian Burnette	Fr
OT	68	Anthony McKinney	Jr
C	69	Coy McMillon	Fr
G	70	Cordel Iwuagwu	Jr
C	71	Blake Hickey	Jr
OT	72	Kris Dike	Fr
G	74	Chris Graynor	Sr
OT	77	Lucas Niang	Jr
G	78	Wes Harris	Fr
G	79	Esteban Avila	Fr
WR	80	Al'Dontre Davis	Fr
TE	81	Pro Wells	So
WR	82	Ryan Martin	Jr
WR	83	Brady Stringer	So
RB	84	Jason D'Armore	So
TE	84	Cole Novak	Sr
TE	85	Christian Williams	Sr
WR	87	TreVontae Hights	Jr
TE	88	Artayvious Lynn	So
WR	89	Austin Ahrendt	Sr
TE	98	Casey McDermott Vai	Sr

Defense

Pos.	#	Name	Class
LB	1	Jawuan Johnson	Sr
S	2	Niko Small	Sr
S	3	Markell Simmons	Sr
CB	4	Keenan Reed	Jr
S	6	Innis Gaines	Jr
LB	7	Arico Evans	Sr
S	9	Atanza Vongor	Fr
LB	11	Montrel Wilson	Jr
CB	12	Jeff Gladney	Jr
S	14	DeMauryon Holmes	Fr
DE	15	Ben Banogu	Sr
S	16	C. J. Caesar II	Fr
S	17	Trevon Moehrig	Fr
LB	18	Ben Wilson	Fr
S	20	La'Kendrick Van Zandt	Fr
CB	21	Noah Daniels	Fr
CB	22	Michael Onyemaobi	Fr
LB	23	Alec Dunham	Sr
CB	24	Julius Lewis	Jr
S	26	Vernon Scott	Jr
S	27	Ar'Darius Washington	Fr
CB	28	Tony James	Sr
LB	30	Garret Wallow	So
S	31	Ridwan Issahaku	Sr
DE	32	Ochaun Mathis	Fr
S	33	Ryan McGee	Sr
LB	34	Blake Patterson	Fr
LB	35	Elias Garcia	So
S	37	Travis Carpenter	Fr
DE	40	Michael Epley	Sr
DE	41	Brandon Bowen	So
LB	42	Ty Summers	Sr
DT	43	Izaih Filikitonga	Fr
DT	44	Ezra Tu'ua	Sr
LB	46	Connor Koch	Fr
LB	47	Jacoby Simpson	Fr
CB	48	Caleb Biggurs	Fr
DT	54	Joseph Broadnax Jr.	Sr
DE	86	Gary Overshown	So
DT	90	Ross Blacklock	Jr
DE	91	L. J. Collier	Sr
DT	93	George Ellis III	Fr
DT	94	Corey Bethley	So
DT	95	Terrell Cooper	Fr
DE	97	Christian Applewhite	Jr
DT	99	Soni Misi	So

Special teams

Pos.	#	Name	Class
P	29	Adam Nunez	Jr
K	32	Jonathan Trujillo	Fr
P	34	Andrew David	Jr
K	37	Cole Bunce	Jr
K	39	Maxwell Finch	So
K	40	Ray Thomas	So
P	41	Dillon Jones	So
P	42	Dearan Roche	Fr
K	46	Jonathan Song	Jr
LS	49	Antonio Ortiz	Fr
LS	50	Donovan Cahill	So
LS	59	Parker DuBose	Fr
LS	61	Wil Houston	So

Head coach

- Gary Patterson (Head coach, 18th season)

Coordinators/assistant coaches

- Curtis Luper (Co-offensive coordinator/RBs, 6th season)
- Sonny Cumbie (Co-offensive coordinator/QBs, 5th season)
- Chad Glasgow (Defensive coordinator/LBs, 17th season)
- Jarrett Anderson (Inside Wide receivers Coach, 21st season)
- Rusty Burns (Outside Receivers Coach, 10th season)
- Paul Gonzales (Safeties Coach, 7th season)
- Chris Thomsen (Offensive Line Coach, 2nd season)
- Zarnell Fitch (Defensive Line Coach, 5th season)
- Dan Sharp (Defensive Line Coach, 18th season)
- Jeremy Modkins (Cornerbacks Coach, 7th season)
- Nick Kelly (Co-Graduate Assistant–Offense, 2nd season)
- R. J. Fleming (Co-Graduate Assistant–Offense, 3rd season)
- Jonathon Darby (Co-Graduate Assistant–Defense, 2nd season)
- Ilaiu Moeakiola (Co-Graduate Assistant–Defense, 2nd season)
- Jake Brown (co-offensive Analyst, 1st season)
- Tony Savino (co-offensive Analyst, 3rd season)
- Brian Hernandez (co-defensive Analyst, 1st season)
- Darrell Patterson (co-defensive Analyst, 1st season)
- Garrett Altman (Co-Graduate Assistant–Video, 1st season)
- Michael Downing Jr. (Co-Graduate Assistant–Video, 1st season)
- Demontie Cross (director of player personnel, 1st season)
- Brett Lemoine (director of high school relations, 2nd season)
- Rachel Phillips (director of Recruiting Relations, 2nd season)
- Matt Lewis (Director–Football Operations, 16th season)
- Don Sommer (Head Strength and Conditioning Coach, 18th season)
- David Gable (Assoc. Director–Sports Medicine, 16th season)

Legend

- (C) Team captain
- (S) Suspended
- (I) Ineligible
- Injured
- Redshirt

Roster
Last update: August 29, 2016

== Game summaries ==
=== Southern ===
	1	2	3	4	Total
Jaguars	0	7	0	0	7
No. 16 Horned Frogs	17	21	17	0	55

=== At SMU ===
	1	2	3	4	Total
No. 16 Horned Frogs	0	14	14	14	42
Mustangs	9	3	0	0	12

=== Vs. Ohio State ===
	1	2	3	4	Total
No. 4 Buckeyes	10	3	20	7	40
No. 15 Horned Frogs	7	7	14	0	28

=== At Texas ===
	1	2	3	4	Total
No. 17 Horned Frogs	6	7	3	0	16
Longhorns	7	3	14	7	31

=== Iowa State ===
	1	2	3	4	Total
Cyclones	0	7	0	7	14
Horned Frogs	0	7	7	3	17

=== Texas Tech ===
	1	2	3	4	Total
Red Raiders	3	0	7	7	17
Horned Frogs	0	7	0	7	14

=== Oklahoma ===
	1	2	3	4	Total
No. 9 Sooners	14	14	10	14	52
Horned Frogs	7	17	3	0	27

=== At Kansas ===
	1	2	3	4	Total
Horned Frogs	0	10	7	9	26
Jayhawks	7	0	10	10	27

=== Kansas State ===
	1	2	3	4	Total
Wildcats	7	0	0	6	13
Horned Frogs	7	0	7	0	14

When the two Big 12 conference teams that both wear purple got together for the 2018 matchup, Kansas State lost quarterback Skylar Thompson to an injury in the first quarter and the Wildcats wen to backup Alex Delton. Kansas State kept the game close but missed a PAT leaving the score 14-13 in favor of TCU. "Of course I feel horrible for him," Snyder said. "He's one of the young guys. He didn't lose the ballgame for us. There were a bunch of us that made mistakes that contributed." With the loss, K-State was left in a position to win the last three games in order to be eligible for post-season bowl games.

=== At West Virginia ===
	1	2	3	4	Total
Horned Frogs	3	0	7	0	10
Mountaineers	0	24	16	7	47

=== At Baylor ===
	1	2	3	4	Total
Horned Frogs	3	6	7	0	16
Bears	6	0	3	0	9

=== Oklahoma State ===
	1	2	3	4	Total
Cowboys	3	0	7	14	24
Horned Frogs	0	7	17	7	31

=== Vs. California–Cheez-It Bowl ===
	1	2	3	4	OT	Total
Golden Bears	7	0	0	0	0	7
Horned Frogs	0	0	7	0	3	10

== Statistics ==
=== Scoring ===
Scores against non-conference opponents

	1	2	3	4	Total
Opponents	19	13	20	7	59
TCU	24	42	45	14	125

Scores against the Big 12

	1	2	3	4	Total
Opponents	7	3	14	7	31
TCU	6	7	3	0	16

Scores against all opponents

	1	2	3	4	Total
Opponents	16	16	34	14	80
TCU	30	49	48	14	141

== Rankings ==
Ranking movements Legend: ██ Increase in ranking ██ Decrease in ranking — = Not ranked RV = Received votes
	Week															
Poll	Pre	1	2	3	4	5	6	7	8	9	10	11	12	13	14	Final
AP	16	16	15	17	RV	RV	RV	—	—	—	—	—	—	—	—	—
Coaches	16	16	14	17	RV	RV	RV	—	—	—	—	—	—	—	—	—
CFP	Not released									—	—	—	—	—	—	Not released

== Honors and awards ==
=== Preseason awards ===
- Ben Banogu (DL)

Preseason Big 12 Defensive Player of the Year
Preseason All-Big 12

- KaVontae Turpin (WR/KR/PR)

Preseason All-Big 12 (Return Specialist)

== Players drafted into the NFL ==
Round	Pick	Player	Position	NFL Club
1	29	L. J. Collier	DE	Seattle Seahawks
2	49	Ben Banogu	OLB	Indianapolis Colts
7	226	Ty Summers	LB	Green Bay Packers
