= Dru Samia =

American football player (born 1997)

No. 73
- Position: Guard

Personal information
- Born: August 22, 1997 (age 29); Danville, California, U.S.
- Listed height: 6 ft 5 in (1.96 m)
- Listed weight: 306 lb (139 kg)

Career information
- High school: San Ramon Valley (Danville)
- College: Oklahoma (2015–2018)
- NFL draft: 2019: 4th round, 114th overall pick

Career history
- Minnesota Vikings (2019–2020); New York Jets (2021–2022); Arlington Renegades (2024)

Awards and highlights
- Big 12 Co-Offensive Lineman of the Year (2018); First-team All-Big 12 (2018); Second-team All-Big 12 (2017)

Career NFL statistics
- Games played: 15
- Games started: 4
- Stats at Pro Football Reference

Dru Samia III (born August 22, 1997) is an American former professional football player who was an offensive guard in the National Football League (NFL). He played college football for the Oklahoma Sooners. He played in the NFL for the Minnesota Vikings and New York Jets.

== College career ==
A four-star offensive tackle recruit, Samia chose Oklahoma out of 15 scholarship offers received.

Samia won the 2018 Joe Moore Award, and was named a second-team All-American and first-team All-Big 12 Conference after moving from right tackle to right guard. Scouts noted Samia for his hustle to the whistle, but also noted an occasionally high pad level. During his time at Oklahoma, Samia also made the All-Big 12 Academic Team twice.

== Professional career ==
=== Pre-draft ===
Pre-draft measurables
Height	Weight	Arm length	Hand span	40-yard dash	10-yard split	20-yard split	20-yard shuttle	Three-cone drill	Vertical jump	Broad jump	Bench press
6 ft 4 3/4 in (1.95 m)	305 lb (138 kg)	33 in (0.84 m)	10 1/8 in (0.26 m)	5.29 s	1.84 s	3.08 s	4.70 s	7.89 s	27.5 in (0.70 m)	8 ft 5 in (2.57 m)	28 reps
All values from NFL Combine

At the 2019 NFL Scouting Combine, Samia ran the 40-yard dash in 5.29 seconds, recorded 28 reps on the bench press, a 27.5-inch vertical jump and a 101-inch broad jump.

=== Minnesota Vikings ===
Samia was selected by the Minnesota Vikings in the fourth round (114th overall) of the 2019 NFL draft.

Samia was placed on the reserve/COVID-19 list by the team on November 16, 2020, and activated on November 25.

On August 31, 2021, Samia was waived/injured by the Vikings and placed on injured reserve. He was released on September 8, 2021.

=== New York Jets ===
On October 12, 2021, Samia was signed to the practice squad of the New York Jets. He signed a reserve/future contract with the Jets on January 10, 2022. He was waived on July 26, 2022, and placed on the reserve/physically unable to perform list. He was released on March 13, 2023.

=== Arlington Renegades ===
On November 9, 2023, Samia signed with the Arlington Renegades of the XFL.

== Personal life ==
Samia is half Samoan, and got a tattoo to signify the importance of the Samoan culture to him.
