= Yodny Cajuste =

American football player (born 1996)

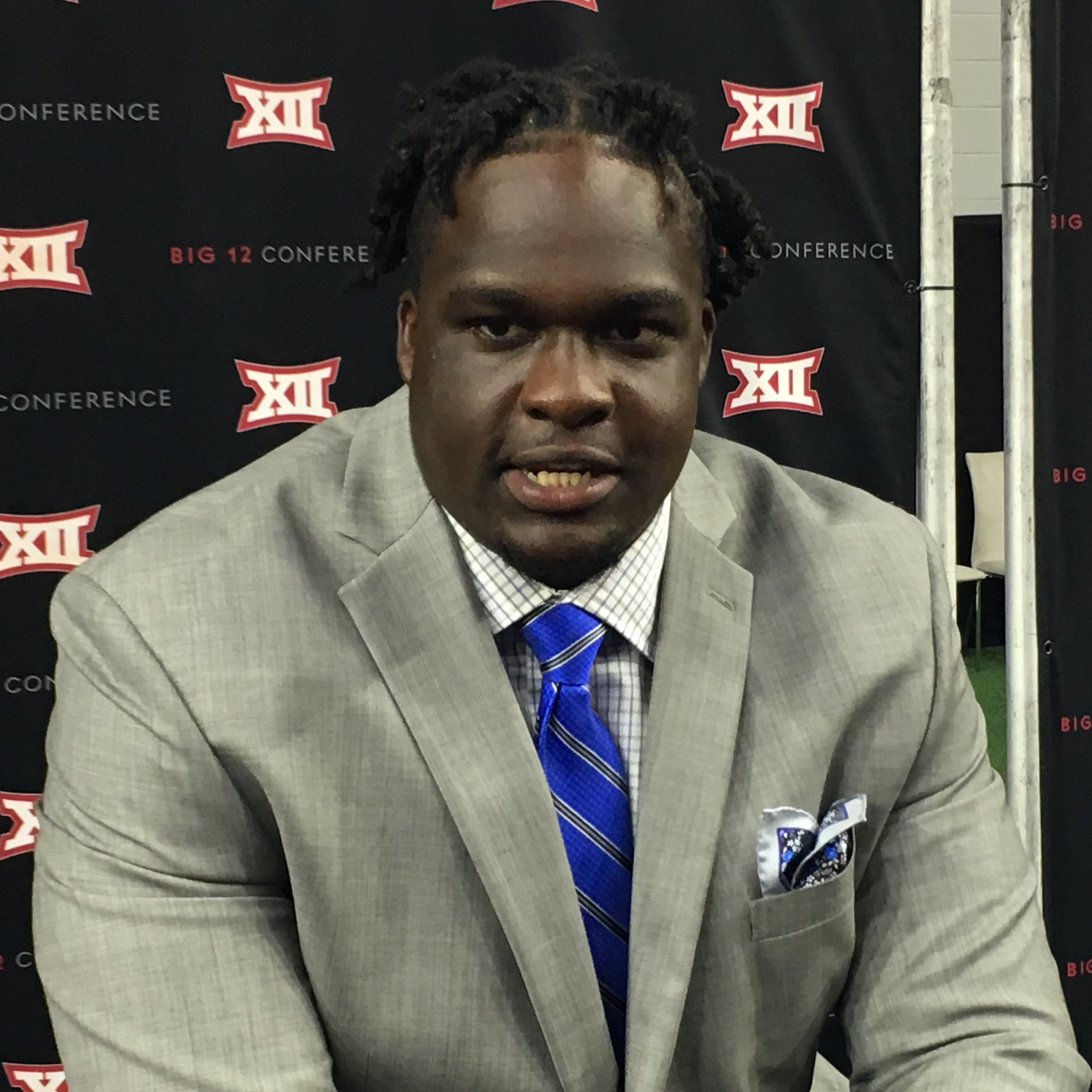
- Cajuste at 2018 Big 12 Media Days

Profile
- Position: Offensive tackle

Personal information
- Born: February 21, 1996 (age 30); Miami, Florida, U.S.
- Listed height: 6 ft 5 in (1.96 m)
- Listed weight: 310 lb (141 kg)

Career information
- High school: Miramar (FL)
- College: West Virginia (2014–2018)
- NFL draft: 2019: 3rd round, 101st overall pick

Career history
- New England Patriots (2019–2022); New York Jets (2023)*; New York Giants (2023–2024)*; Miami Dolphins (2025)
- * Offseason or practice squad member only

Awards and highlights
- Big 12 Co-Offensive Lineman of the Year (2018); First-team All-Big 12 (2018); Second team All-Big 12 (2017)

Career NFL statistics as of 2025
- Games played: 17
- Games started: 5
- Stats at Pro Football Reference

Yodny Cajuste (born February 21, 1996) is an American professional football offensive tackle. He played college football at West Virginia.

== College career ==
Cajuste played college football for West Virginia. He redshirted during the 2014 season. During the 2015 season, he started 6 games before suffering an injury against Baylor. He would return at the end of the season however, as the Mountaineers won the Cactus Bowl. In 2016, he sustained a season-ending injury during the first game of the season against Missouri. During 2017, he started 13 games for the Mountaineers and earned All-Big 12 Conference Second Team honors. During his final season, 2018, he earned multiple honors including Football Writers Association of America All-American (Second Team), Phil Steele All-America (Second Team), Athlon Sports All-America (Fourth Team), Big 12 Conference Co-Offensive Lineman of the Year, and All-Big 12 Conference First Team.

== Professional career ==
Pre-draft measurables
Height	Weight	Arm length	Hand span	Wingspan	Bench press
6 ft 4 7/8 in (1.95 m)	312 lb (142 kg)	34 in (0.86 m)	10 in (0.25 m)	6 ft 10 1/4 in (2.09 m)	32 reps
All values from NFL Combine

=== New England Patriots ===
Cajuste was drafted by the New England Patriots in the third round (101st overall) of the 2019 NFL draft. He was placed on the non-football injury list to start the season after undergoing quad surgery.

On September 10, 2020, Cajuste was placed on injured reserve with a knee injury.

Cajuste entered the 2021 season as a backup tackle for the Patriots. He made his first career starts in Weeks 5 and 6 at right tackle.

On October 1, 2022, Cajuste was placed on injured reserve with a thumb injury. He was activated on October 29.

On May 18, 2023, Cajuste was waived by New England.

=== New York Jets ===
On May 30, 2023, Cajuste signed with the New York Jets. He was waived/injured on August 8, 2023. After going unclaimed, he reverted to the team’s injured reserve list. He was released on August 17.

=== New York Giants ===
On October 11, 2023, Cajuste signed with the practice squad of the New York Giants. Following the end of the 2023 regular season, the Giants signed him to a reserve/future contract on January 8, 2024. He was placed on injured reserve on August 20, 2024. He was released on September 4.

=== Miami Dolphins ===
On August 14, 2025, Cajuste signed with the Miami Dolphins, but placed on injured reserve four days later.
