= JaQuan Bailey =

American football player (born 1997)

No. 3, 66, 94
- Position: Defensive end

Personal information
- Born: May 28, 1997 (age 29); Jacksonville, Florida, U.S.
- Listed height: 6 ft 2 in (1.88 m)
- Listed weight: 261 lb (118 kg)

Career information
- High school: William M. Raines {Jacksonville}
- College: Iowa State
- NFL draft: 2021: undrafted

Career history
- Philadelphia Eagles (2021)*; Michigan Panthers (2022)
- * Offseason or practice squad member only

Awards and highlights
- Third-team All-American (2020); First-team All-Big 12 (2020); Second-team All-Big 12 (2018)
- Stats at Pro Football Reference

JaQuan Bailey (born May 28, 1997) is an American former professional football player who was a defensive end. He played college football for the Iowa State Cyclones and signed as an undrafted free agent with the Philadelphia Eagles of the National Football League (NFL) in May 2021.

== Early life and education ==
Bailey was born on May 28, 1997 in Jacksonville, Florida. He went to William M. Raines High School before attending Iowa State University. He was a 3-star recruit and choose Iowa State over offers from Tennessee, Florida, Louisville, and Virginia Tech. In his first season he played in 12 games, starting 7, and was named Freshmen All-America. The next season he was an Honorable Mention All Big-12, with 7 sacks. He played in 13 games for the second straight year in 2018. He had 46 tackles to lead all Iowa State defensive linemen. He was named Second-team All Big-12 and on the Ted Hendricks award watchlist. In 2019, he played in 4 games before being a medical redshirt. In 2020, he started all 12 games, and was named First-team All-American by two selectors. He was also named first-team All-Big-12.

== Professional career ==
=== Philadelphia Eagles ===
Bailey signed as an undrafted free agent with the Philadelphia Eagles after going undrafted in the 2021 NFL draft. He was waived on August 29, 2021.

=== Michigan Panthers ===
Bailey was selected in the 25th round of the 2022 USFL draft by the Michigan Panthers.

== Personal life ==
His twin brother Joshua also played with Iowa State.

Bailey is now a member of a pit crew.
