= Caden Sterns =

American football player (born 1999)

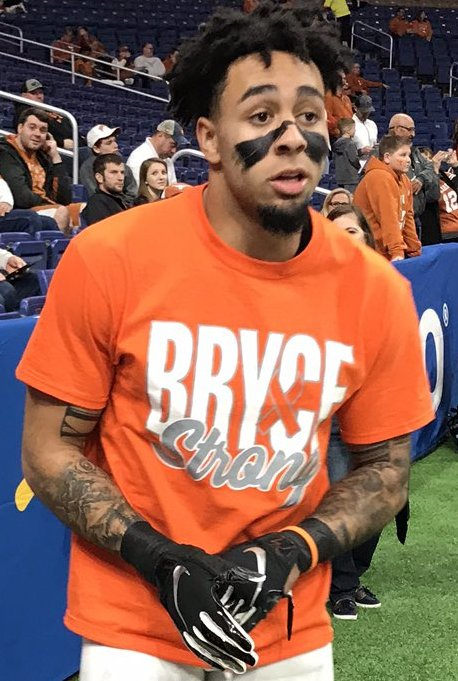
- Sterns at the Alamo Bowl in 2020

No. 30
- Position: Safety

Personal information
- Born: November 2, 1999 (age 27); Dallas, Texas, U.S.
- Listed height: 6 ft 1 in (1.85 m)
- Listed weight: 207 lb (94 kg)

Career information
- High school: Byron P. Steele II (Cibolo, Texas)
- College: Texas (2018–2020)
- NFL draft: 2021: 5th round, 152nd overall pick

Career history
- Denver Broncos (2021–2023); Carolina Panthers (2024)*; Philadelphia Eagles (2024)*
- * Offseason or practice squad member only

Awards and highlights
- Big 12 Defensive Freshman of the Year (2018); First-team All-Big 12 (2018); Freshman All-American (2018)

Career NFL statistics
- Total tackles: 49
- Sacks: 2
- Pass deflections: 9
- Interceptions: 4
- Stats at Pro Football Reference

Caden Sterns (born November 2, 1999) is an American former professional football player who was a safety in the National Football League (NFL). He played college football for the Texas Longhorns and was selected by the Denver Broncos in the fifth round of the 2021 NFL draft.

== Early life ==
Sterns attended Steele High School in Cibolo, Texas. Sterns older brother, Jordan, was a star two-way player in high school (2010-2013) and would later play at Oklahoma State University. During his career, Sterns had 235 tackles and 11 interceptions. He was selected to play in the 2018 U.S. Army All-American Bowl and won the Pete Dawkins Trophy as the game's MVP. A five-star recruit, Sterns originally committed to play college football at Louisiana State University (LSU) before switching the University of Texas at Austin.

== College career ==
Sterns started all 13 games his true freshman season at Texas in 2018. He was the Big 12 Conference Defensive Freshman of the Year and was named a first-team All-Big 12 after recording 62 tackles, four interceptions and one sack. Sterns played in nine games his sophomore year in 2019, finishing with 59 tackles and one sack.

On November 30, 2020, Sterns declared for the 2021 NFL draft and opted out of the remainder of the season.

== Professional career ==
Pre-draft measurables
Height	Weight	Arm length	Hand span	40-yard dash	10-yard split	20-yard split	20-yard shuttle	Three-cone drill	Vertical jump	Broad jump	Bench press
5 ft 11 7/8 in (1.83 m)	202 lb (92 kg)	32 1/8 in (0.82 m)	9 1/2 in (0.24 m)	4.40 s	1.50 s	2.47 s	4.13 s	6.96 s	42.0 in (1.07 m)	10 ft 8 in (3.25 m)	14 reps
All values from Pro Day

=== Denver Broncos ===
Sterns was selected by the Denver Broncos in the fifth round, 152nd overall, of the 2021 NFL draft. On May 11, 2021, Sterns officially signed with the Broncos. In 2021 he moved into the lineup following an injury to Ronald Darby and in week 3 he became the first rookie to record two sacks in one game since 2016. In the same game he broke up a 44 yard pass. That season he played in 15 games, with 2 starts, had 2 interceptions for 47 yards (including a career-long 46 yarder), 5 pass deflections, 2 sacks, 28 tackles, 2 TFLs and 2 QB hits.

In 2022 he played in the first 5 games of the season and started 3 of them before injuring his hip. On October 28, 2022, Sterns was placed on injured reserve. He had 2 interceptions, in the same game, for 25 yards, 4 pass deflections and 21 tackles.

On September 13, 2023, Sterns was placed on injured reserve after suffering a torn patellar tendon in Week 1 and missed the remainder of the season after playing only in 5 downs.

He was activated off the PUP list in July of 2024 and, after failing to get a trade offer, he was released by the Broncos on August 5, 2024.

=== Carolina Panthers ===
On August 6, 2024, Sterns was claimed off waivers by the Carolina Panthers but was released two days later following a failed physical.

=== Philadelphia Eagles ===
On August 11, 2024, Sterns signed with the Philadelphia Eagles. He was released on August 27, and was subsequently re-signed to the practice squad. Sterns was released again on September 3, re-signed again on the 10, and then released again two days later. Sterns was re-signed to the practice squad on September 17. He was released again on October 10.

On October 16, 2025, Sterns announced his retirement from professional football, citing injuries he had suffered throughout his career.

== Personal life ==
Sterns has three brothers, each of whom have played football at the collegiate level. His oldest brother Jordan played safety at Oklahoma State from 2013–16, his youngest brother Josh is currently a wide receiver at Western Kentucky Hilltoppers along with his other brother Jerreth Sterns who also plays wide receiver as well. Jerreth played at what was then known as Houston Baptist University and then transferred to Western Kentucky Hilltoppers for his senior year to play along with his teammate, quarterback Bailey Zappe. Jerreth currently plays for the Winnipeg Blue Bombers of the Canadian Football League.
