= Austin Seibert =

American football player (born 1996)

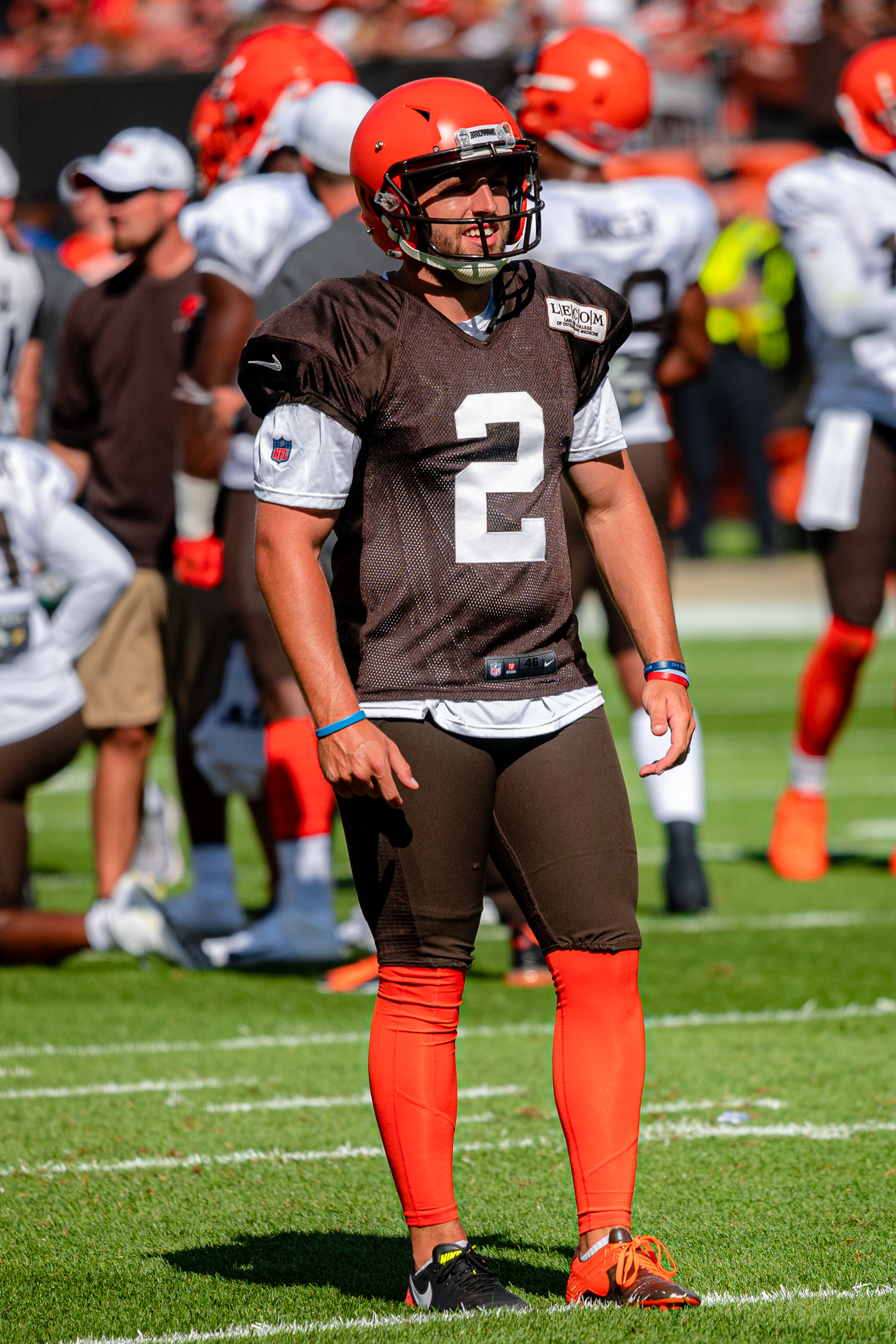
- Seibert with the Cleveland Browns in 2019

Profile
- Position: Placekicker

Personal information
- Born: November 15, 1996 (age 29); Belleville, Illinois, U.S.
- Listed height: 5 ft 9 in (1.75 m)
- Listed weight: 211 lb (96 kg)

Career information
- High school: Belleville West
- College: Oklahoma (2015–2018)
- NFL draft: 2019: 5th round, 170th overall pick

Career history
- Cleveland Browns (2019–2020); Cincinnati Bengals (2020); Detroit Lions (2021–2022); New York Jets (2023); New Orleans Saints (2023)*; New York Jets (2023); Washington Commanders (2024)
- * Offseason or practice squad member only

Awards and highlights
- PFWA All-Rookie Team (2019); Big 12 Special Teams Player of the Year (2018); First-team All-Big 12 (2018); 2× second-team All-Big 12 (2015, 2017)

Career NFL statistics
- Field goals: 72
- Field goal attempts: 86
- Field goal %: 83.7%
- Longest field goal: 55
- Touchbacks: 67
- Stats at Pro Football Reference

Austin Mitchell Seibert (born November 15, 1996) is an American former professional football player who was a placekicker in the National Football League (NFL). He played college football for the Oklahoma Sooners, where he was named the 2018 Big 12 Special Teams Player of the Year, and was selected by the Cleveland Browns in the fifth round of the 2019 NFL draft. Seibert was also a member of the Cincinnati Bengals, Detroit Lions, New York Jets, New Orleans Saints, and Washington Commanders. He holds the Commanders' franchise record for field goals made in a game with seven.

== Early life ==
Seibert was born on November 15, 1996, in Belleville, Illinois, later attending Belleville High School-West.

== College career ==
Seibert attended and played college football for the Oklahoma Sooners. He contributed to the football team as a placekicker and a punter. He was named the 2018 Big 12 Special Teams Player of the Year.

=== Statistics ===
College statistics
Season	Kicking								Punting		
Season	GP	XPM	XPA	XP%	FGM	FGA	FG%	Pts	Punts	Yds	Avg
2015	13	70	72	97.2	18	23	78.3	124	57	2,395	42.0
2016	13	72	74	97.3	11	16	68.8	105	48	1,975	41.1
2017	14	81	81	100.0	17	21	81.0	132	43	1,820	42.3
2018	14	87	88	98.9	17	19	89.5	138	31	1,267	40.9
Career	54	310	315	98.4	63	79	79.7	499	179	7,457	41.7

== Professional career ==
Pre-draft measurables
Height	Weight	Arm length	Hand span
5 ft 9 1/4 in (1.76 m)	213 lb (97 kg)	30 3/8 in (0.77 m)	8 7/8 in (0.23 m)
All values from NFL Combine

=== Cleveland Browns ===
Seibert was selected by the Cleveland Browns in the fifth round (170th overall) of the 2019 NFL draft. Seibert signed his rookie contract with the Browns on May 3, 2019.

Seibert made the Browns' 53-man roster out of training camp. He made his NFL debut in the Browns' 2019 regular season opener against the Tennessee Titans. He converted one of two extra point attempts in the 43–13 loss. He scored his first career field goal during the Browns' Week 2 game against the New York Jets, where he kicked three field goals in a Browns' 23–3 win. As a rookie, he converted 30 of 35 extra point attempts and 25 of 29 field goal attempts. He was named to the PFWA All-Rookie Team.

Seibert was waived by the Browns on September 14, 2020, after missing a field goal and extra point in a 38–6 loss to the Baltimore Ravens in Week 1.

=== Cincinnati Bengals ===
Seibert was claimed off waivers by the Cincinnati Bengals on September 15, 2020. Seibert played in four games during the 2020 season with the Bengals making six of nine field goals and all eight of the extra points he attempted. He was waived on August 31, 2021, after losing out the starting kicker job to Evan McPherson in training camp.

=== Detroit Lions ===
On September 1, 2021, the Detroit Lions claimed Seibert off waivers. On September 23, 2021, Seibert was placed on the COVID-19 reserve list. He was replaced on the active roster by kicker Ryan Santoso, who had just been signed to the practice squad. He was placed on injured reserve on November 13 with a hip injury. He appeared in six games in the 2021 season. He converted all five extra point attempts and 10 of 12 field goal attempts.

Seibert was waived by the Lions on October 6, 2022, after the team signed Michael Badgley. In the 2022 season, he converted all 12 extra point attempts and three of five field goal attempts in three games.

=== New York Jets (first stint) ===
On September 16, 2023, Seibert was signed to the New York Jets practice squad following an injury to kicker Greg Zuerlein. He was released on September 30.

=== New Orleans Saints ===
On November 28, 2023, Seibert was signed to the New Orleans Saints practice squad. He was released on December 7.

=== New York Jets (second stint) ===
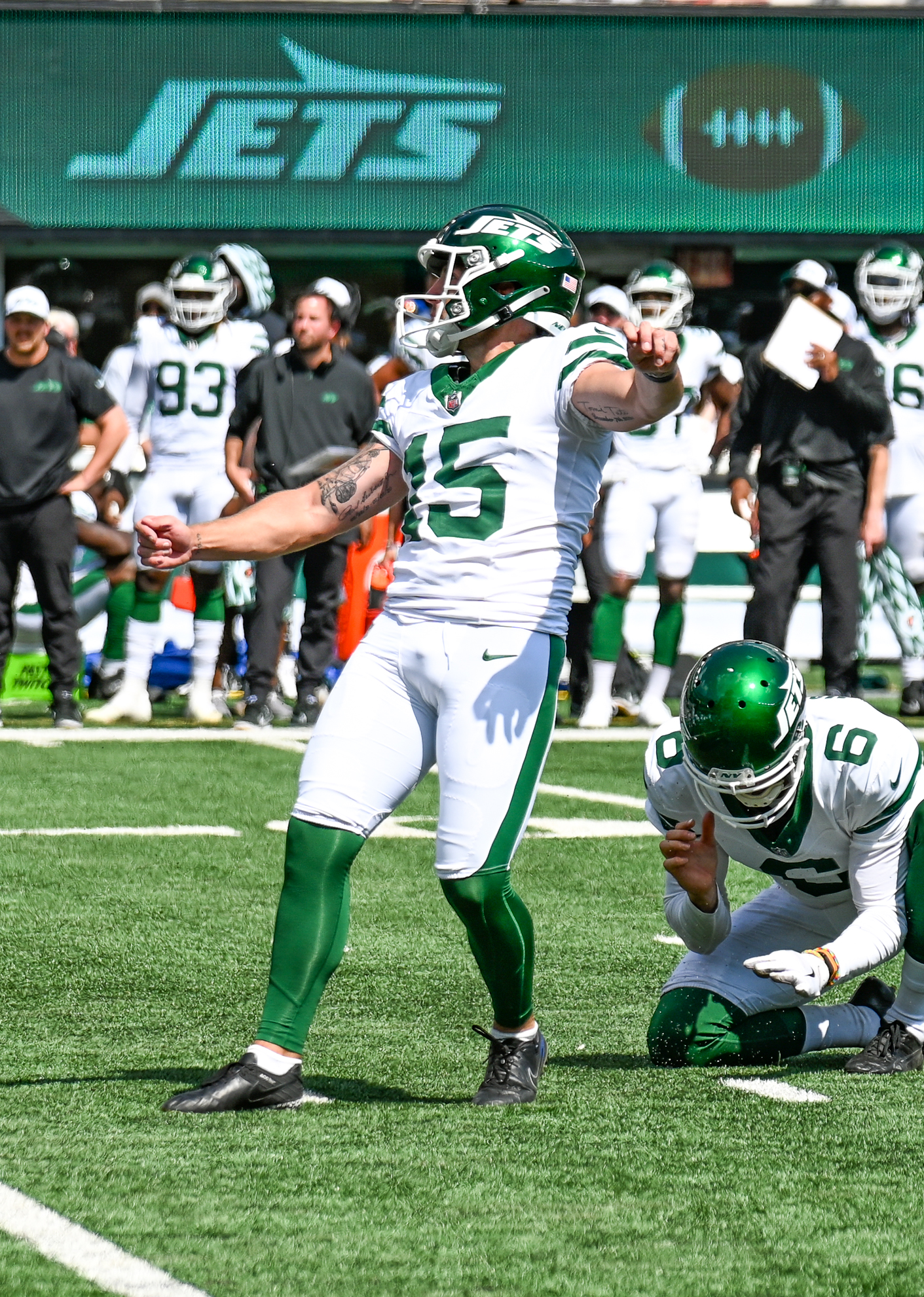
Seibert kicking a field goal against the Washington Commanders, 2024

On December 27, 2023, Seibert was signed to the Jets practice squad. He signed a reserve/future contract on January 8, 2024. He was released on August 27, 2024.

=== Washington Commanders ===
On September 10, 2024, Seibert signed with the Washington Commanders. In Week 2, he was named the NFC Special Teams Player of the Week after kicking a franchise-record seven field goals in his Washington debut, accounting for all of the team's points in a 21–18 victory over the New York Giants. Seibert was placed on injured reserve for a hip injury on November 26, 2024.
