= Dalton Risner =

American football player (born 1995)

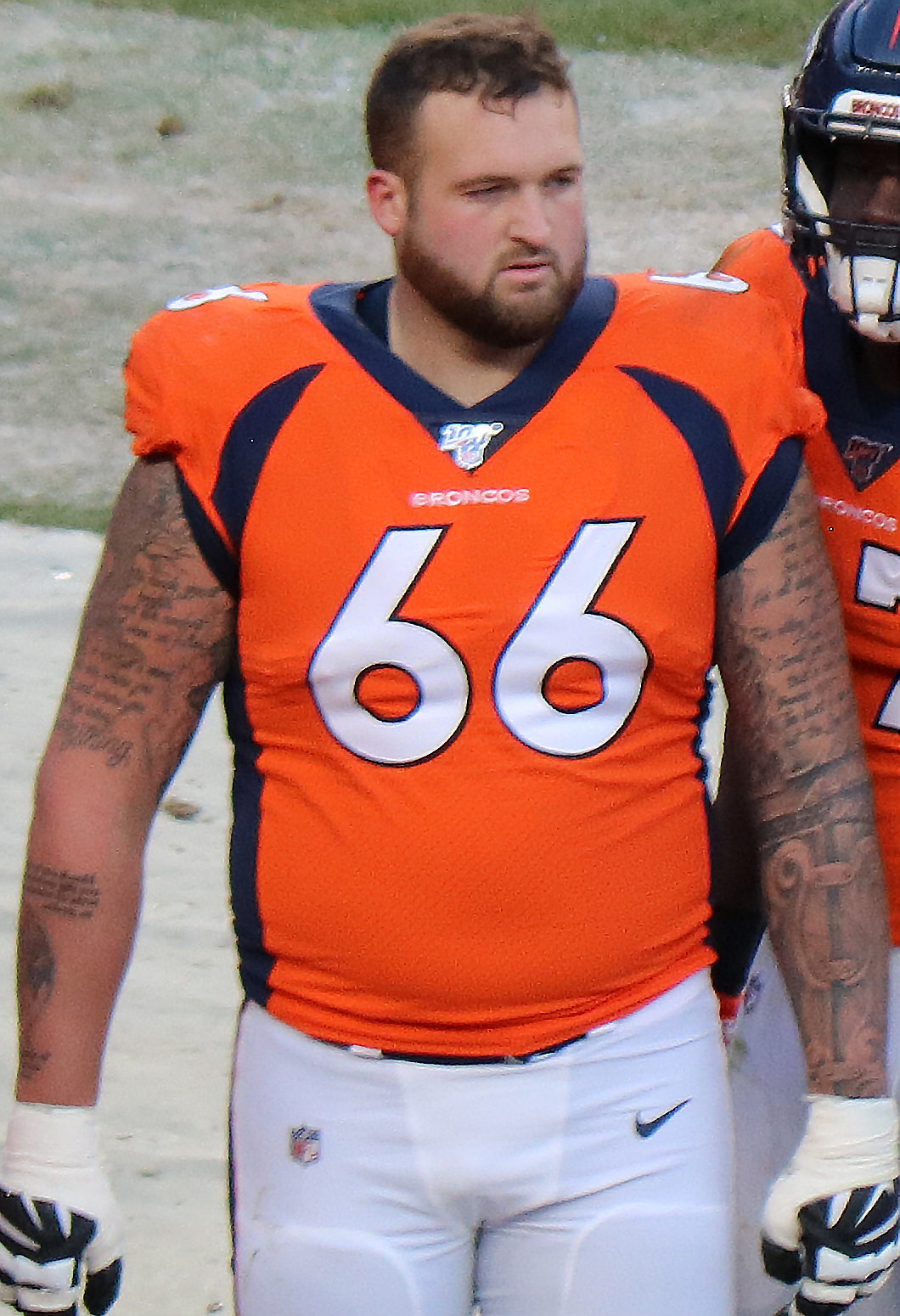
- Risner with the Denver Broncos in 2019

No. 66 – Cincinnati Bengals
- Position: Guard
- Roster status: Active

Personal information
- Born: July 13, 1995 (age 31); Branson, Missouri, U.S.
- Listed height: 6 ft 5 in (1.96 m)
- Listed weight: 312 lb (142 kg)

Career information
- High school: Wiggins (Wiggins, Colorado)
- College: Kansas State (2014–2018)
- NFL draft: 2019: 2nd round, 41st overall pick

Career history
- Denver Broncos (2019–2022); Minnesota Vikings (2023–2024); Cincinnati Bengals (2025–present)

Awards and highlights
- PFWA NFL All-Rookie Team (2019); First-team All-American (2018); Big 12 Co-Offensive Lineman of the Year (2018); 3× First-team All-Big 12 (2016–2018)

Career NFL statistics as of 2025
- Games played: 101
- Games started: 92
- Stats at Pro Football Reference

Dalton William Risner (born July 13, 1995) is an American professional football offensive guard for the Cincinnati Bengals of the National Football League (NFL). He played college football for the Kansas State Wildcats and was selected by the Denver Broncos in the second round of the 2019 NFL draft.

== Early life ==
Risner attended Wiggins High School in Wiggins, Colorado.

== College career ==
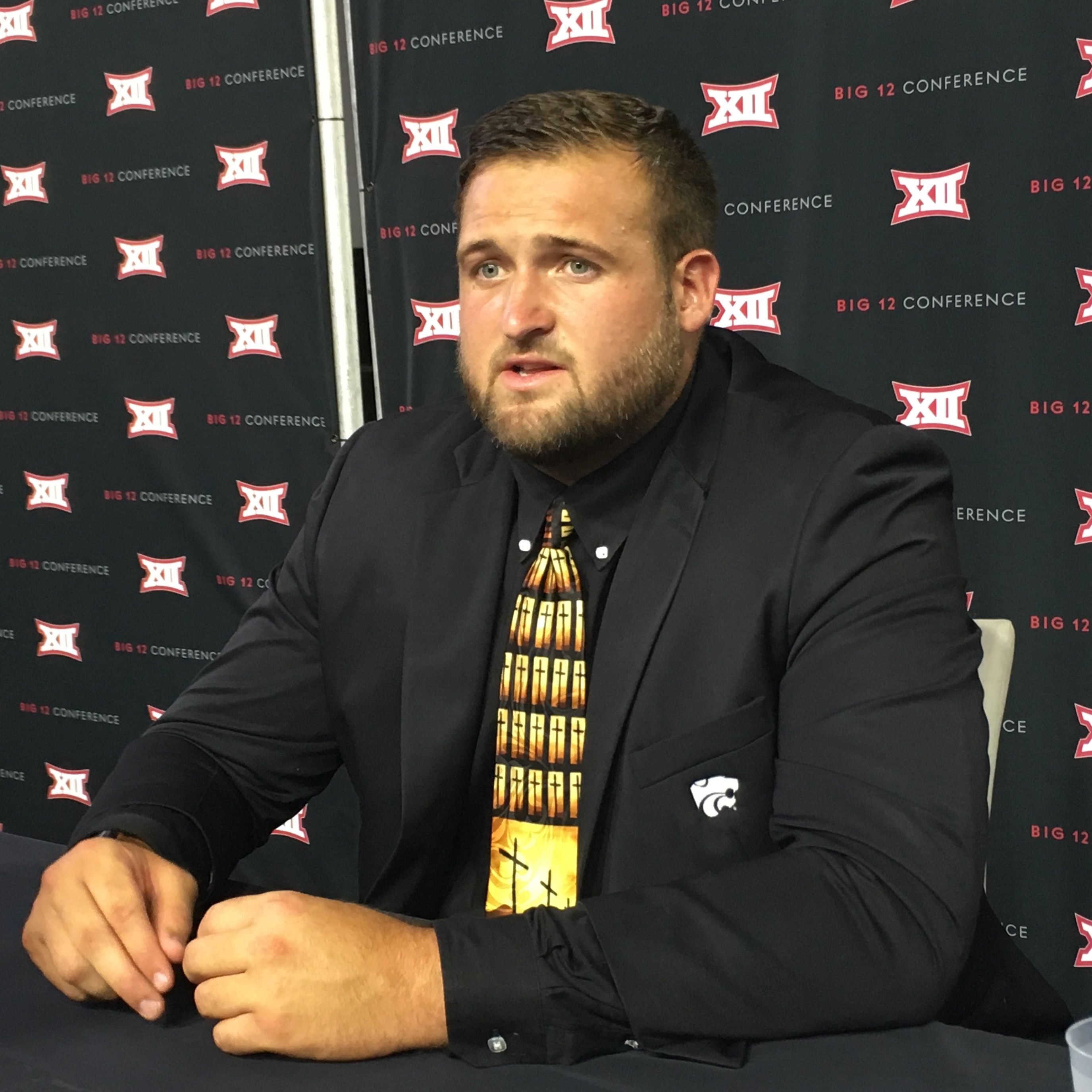
Risner at 2018 Big 12 Media Days

Risner played for the Kansas State University Wildcats from 2014 to 2018. During his career, he started 50 of 51 games. As a senior, he was named an All-American by numerous publications.

== Professional career ==
Pre-draft measurables
Height	Weight	Arm length	Hand span	Wingspan	40-yard dash	10-yard split	20-yard split	20-yard shuttle	Three-cone drill	Vertical jump	Broad jump	Bench press
6 ft 4 3/4 in (1.95 m)	312 lb (142 kg)	34 in (0.86 m)	10 1/4 in (0.26 m)	6 ft 9 1/8 in (2.06 m)	5.30 s	1.72 s	3.10 s	4.52 s	7.69 s	28.5 in (0.72 m)	9 ft 2 in (2.79 m)	23 reps
All values from NFL Combine

=== Denver Broncos ===
Risner was selected by the Denver Broncos in the second round (41st overall) of the 2019 NFL draft.

Risner was named the starting left guard as a rookie and held the spot for the next four seasons, missing four total games due to injury. He was named to the PFWA All-Rookie Team.

On January 3, 2023, Risner was placed on injured reserve with a partial UCL tear in his right elbow.

=== Minnesota Vikings ===
On September 19, 2023, Risner was signed by the Minnesota Vikings. He was named the starting left guard for the remainder of the season in Week 7.

On May 31, 2024, Risner re-signed with the Vikings. He was placed on injured reserve on August 27, to begin the season. He was activated on November 2.

=== Cincinnati Bengals ===
On August 27, 2025, Risner was signed by the Cincinnati Bengals. Following a Week 1 injury to Lucas Patrick, Risner was named the starting right guard in Week 2. He then replaced rookie Dylan Fairchild at left guard for Weeks 6 and 7, as rookie Jalen Rivers took over as the starting right guard. Risner replaced Rivers in the starting lineup in Week 12 and started there the remainder of the season.

On March 2, 2026, Risner signed a one-year contract extension with the Bengals.

== Personal life ==
Risner created his own non-profit organization called the RisnerUp Foundation.

He also serves as a Global Ambassador for Special Olympics international.
