= Adrian Frye =

American football player (born 1999)

No. 22
- Position: Defensive back

Personal information
- Born: January 21, 1999 (age 27)
- Listed height: 6 ft 0 in (1.83 m)
- Listed weight: 205 lb (93 kg)

Career information
- High school: Eisenhower (Houston, Texas)
- College: Texas Tech
- NFL draft: 2023: undrafted

Career history
- New Orleans Saints (2023)*; Ottawa Redblacks (2024–2026)
- * Offseason or practice squad member only

Awards and highlights
- First-team All-Big 12 (2018); Freshman All-American (2018)
- Stats at CFL.ca

Adrian Frye (born January 21, 1999) is an American professional football defensive back. Frye played college football for the Texas Tech Red Raiders. He also had a stint in the National Football League with the New Orleans Saints.

== College career ==
A three-star prospect out of high school, Frye played college football for the Texas Tech Red Raiders of Texas Tech University from 2017 to 2022. He played in 51 games where he had 101 tackles, including 3.5 tackles for a loss, seven interceptions, 26 passes defended, one forced fumble, and one blocked kick.

== Professional career ==
Pre-draft measurables
| Height | Weight | Arm length | Hand span | Wingspan | 40-yard dash | 10-yard split | 20-yard split | 20-yard shuttle | Three-cone drill | Vertical jump | Broad jump | Bench press |
|---|---|---|---|---|---|---|---|---|---|---|---|---|
| 5 ft 11 1/8 in (1.81 m) | 196 lb (89 kg) | 31 1/4 in (0.79 m) | 9 3/8 in (0.24 m) | 6 ft 4 3/8 in (1.94 m) | 4.54 s | 1.58 s | 2.65 s | 4.53 s | 7.16 s | 32.5 in (0.83 m) | 9 ft 11 in (3.02 m) | 11 reps |
All values from Pro Day

=== New Orleans Saints ===
After not being selected in the 2023 NFL draft, Frye signed with the New Orleans Saints as an undrafted free agent. He was waived on August 29.

=== Ottawa Redblacks ===
On February 8, 2024, Frye signed with the Ottawa Redblacks. He was released on June 10. Frye re-signed with the team on July 16. He made his CFL debut against the Calgary Stampeders in Week 8, where he recorded one defensive tackle. He appeared in six games in 2024 and made six defensive and four special team tackles.

On September 29, 2026, Frye was released by the Redblacks.
