= Ben Banogu =

Nigerian-born American football player (born 1996)

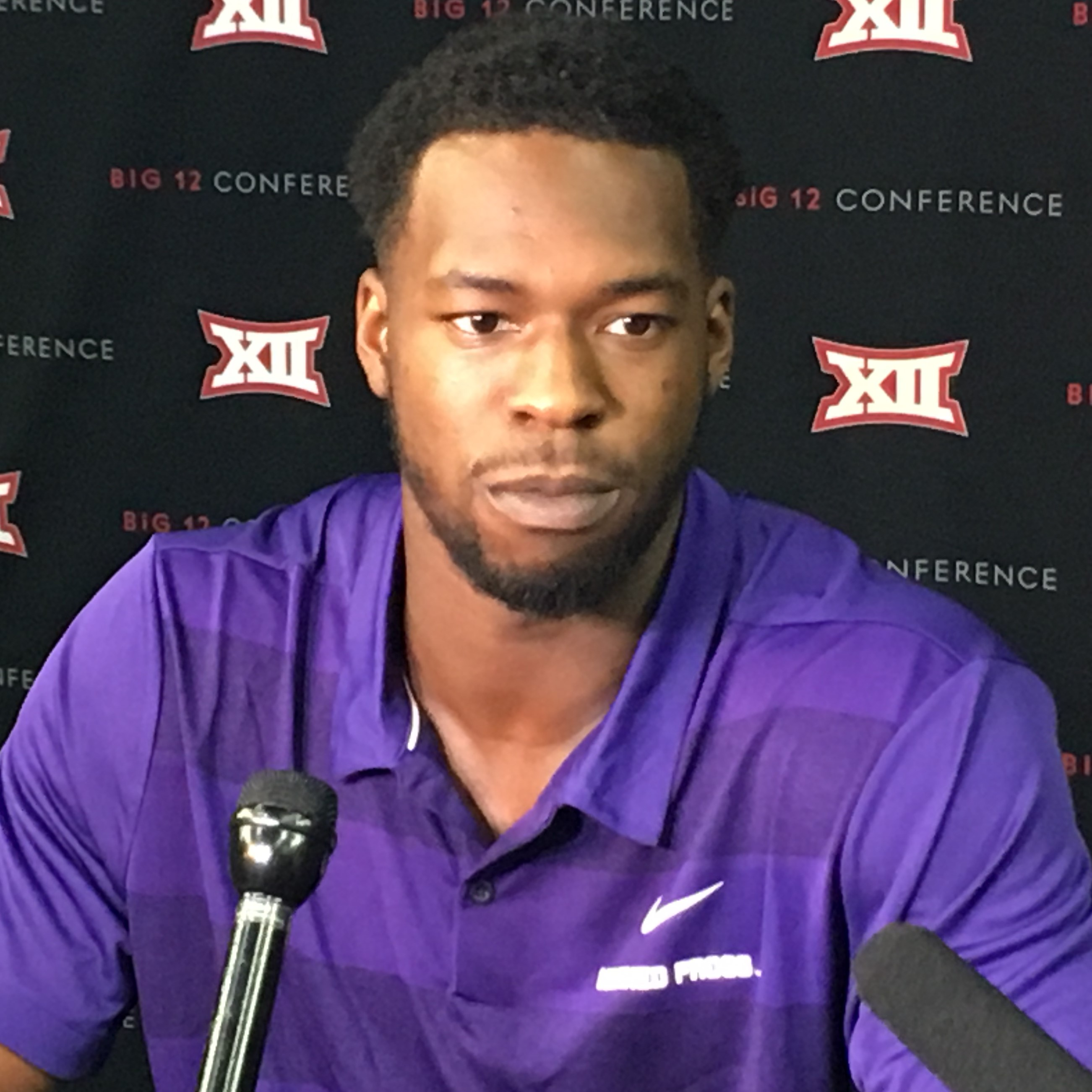
- Banogu in 2018

No. 52
- Position: Defensive end

Personal information
- Born: January 19, 1996 (age 30); Lagos, Nigeria
- Listed height: 6 ft 3 in (1.91 m)
- Listed weight: 252 lb (114 kg)

Career information
- High school: Prosper (Prosper, Texas, U.S.)
- College: UL Monroe (2014–2015); TCU (2016–2018)
- NFL draft: 2019: 2nd round, 49th overall pick

Career history
- Indianapolis Colts (2019–2022); Dallas Cowboys (2023)*
- * Offseason or practice squad member only

Awards and highlights
- 2× First-team All-Big 12 (2017, 2018); Big 12 Defensive Newcomer of the Year (2017)

Career NFL statistics
- Total tackles: 29
- Sacks: 2.5
- Pass deflections: 1
- Forced fumbles: 1
- Stats at Pro Football Reference

Benjamin Chinomso Banogu (born January 19, 1996) is a Nigerian former professional American football defensive end. He played college football at Louisiana-Monroe and TCU.

== Early life ==
Born in Nigeria, Banogu's family moved to U.S. six months after his birth. He grew up in McKinney, Texas attended nearby Prosper High School, where he played football and basketball for the Eagles, in addition to participating in track & field. On February 4, 2014, Banogu signed a letter of intent to attend the University of Louisiana at Monroe on a football scholarship.

== College career ==
=== Louisiana-Monroe ===
Banogu redshirted during his first season at ULM, but became a starter for the Warhawks as a redshirt freshman in 2015. He recorded 5 sacks and 14.5 tackles for loss to earn a spot on the All-Sun Belt Conference Newcomer Team, but chose to leave the program after the season.

=== TCU ===
After transferring to Texas Christian University in January 2016, Banogu sat out the 2016 season and forfeited his sophomore year of eligibility due to NCAA transfer rules. He became a starter for the Horned Frogs as a junior in 2017, totalling 8.5 sacks and 16.5 tackles for loss, earning First-team All-Big 12 honors and helping lead the Frogs to the program's first-ever berth in the Big 12 Championship Game and a win in the 2017 Alamo Bowl over Stanford.

Banogu scored his first collegiate touchdown during his senior season on a 47-yard return of a fumble recovery in a home win against Iowa State in September 2018. He ended the season with 8.5 sacks and 18.0 tackles for loss to once again be named First-team All-Big 12, and helped lead the Frogs to a win over California in the 2018 Cheez-It Bowl.

Following his senior season, Banogu graduated from TCU and was invited to participate in the 2019 Senior Bowl as a linebacker.

== Professional career ==
Pre-draft measurables
Height	Weight	Arm length	Hand span	40-yard dash	10-yard split	20-yard split	20-yard shuttle	Three-cone drill	Vertical jump	Broad jump	Bench press
6 ft 3 1/2 in (1.92 m)	250 lb (113 kg)	33 5/8 in (0.85 m)	9 in (0.23 m)	4.62 s	1.62 s	2.68 s	4.27 s	7.02 s	40.0 in (1.02 m)	11 ft 2 in (3.40 m)	23 reps
All values from NFL Combine

=== Indianapolis Colts ===
Banogu was selected by the Indianapolis Colts in the second round (49th overall) of the 2019 NFL draft. During the season opener against the Los Angeles Chargers, Banogu recorded a half-sack in his first-career game. During the Week 8 game against the Denver Broncos, Banogu sealed the 15–13 victory with his 4th-quarter strip-sack of Joe Flacco, both career-firsts. In Week 12 against the Houston Texans, he brought down Deshaun Watson for a sack.

=== Dallas Cowboys ===
On June 7, 2023, Banogu signed with the Dallas Cowboys. He was released by the Cowboys on August 29.
