= 2016 Oklahoma Sooners football team =

American college football season

2016 Oklahoma Sooners football

Big 12 champion Sugar Bowl champion

Sugar Bowl, W 35–19 vs. Auburn
- Conference: Big 12 Conference

Ranking
- Coaches: No. 3
- AP: No. 5
- Record: 11–2 (9–0 Big 12)
- Head coach: Bob Stoops (18th season)
- Offensive coordinator: Lincoln Riley (2nd season)
- Offensive scheme: Air raid
- Defensive coordinator: Mike Stoops (10th season)
- Base defense: 3–4
- Captains: Jordan Evans; Baker Mayfield; Samaje Perine; Ahmad Thomas
- Home stadium: Gaylord Family Oklahoma Memorial Stadium

2016 Big 12 Conference football standings
	Conf.			Overall
Team	W		L	W		L
No. 5 Oklahoma $	9	–	0	11	–	2
No. 11 Oklahoma State	7	–	2	10	–	3
No. 18 West Virginia	7	–	2	10	–	3
Kansas State	6	–	3	9	–	4
TCU	4	–	5	6	–	7
Baylor	3	–	6	7	–	6
Texas	3	–	6	5	–	7
Texas Tech	3	–	6	5	–	7
Iowa State	2	–	7	3	–	9
Kansas	1	–	8	2	–	10
$ – Conference champion; Rankings from AP Poll

The 2016 Oklahoma Sooners football team represented the University of Oklahoma in the 2016 NCAA Division I FBS football season, the 122nd season of Sooner football. The team was led by head coach Bob Stoops, offensive coordinator Lincoln Riley, and defensive coordinator Mike Stoops, as well as such players as Mark Andrews, Orlando Brown, Jordan Evans, Baker Mayfield, Joe Mixon, Ogbonnia Okoronkwo, Samaje Perine, and Dede Westbrook.

OU was ranked third in the 2016 preseason AP and Coaches' polls. The Sooners lost two of its first three games to non-conference foes (#15 Houston and #3 Ohio State), and neither game was especially close. By the end of September, OU had dropped completely out of the top 25 of both polls. At that time in late September, four of its Big 12 rivals were ranked above them.

Conference play began on October 1 with a 52–46 win at AP #21 TCU and ended with a 38–20 home win against #11 Oklahoma State. Oklahoma finished conference play with a 9–0 record, winning their eleventh Big 12 Championship and second consecutive championship in a row. The conference championship was Stoops’ 10th championship in his 18 years as OU head coach.

Despite the 9 consecutive wins and the conference championship, OU missed out on a return to the 4-team national championship playoff.

Oklahoma did play in the 2017 Sugar Bowl against the Auburn Tigers, winning handily, 35–19. Oklahoma finished the season ranked 5th in the AP poll and 3rd in the Coaches poll, with an 11–2 record.

On June 7, 2017, Stoops announced his retirement after 18 seasons as head coach. Offensive coordinator Lincoln Riley was promoted to head coach.

== Personnel ==
=== Coaching staff ===
Name	Position	Alma mater	Joined staff
Bob Stoops	Head coach	Iowa (1983)	1999
Mike Stoops	Defensive Coordinator / Outside Linebackers / Associate head coach	Iowa (1986)	1999/2012
Cale Gundy	Inside Wide Receivers Coach / assistant head coach / Director of Recruiting	Oklahoma (1994)	1999
Jay Boulware	Special Team Coordinator / running backs coach / fullbacks coach	Texas (1996)	2013
Lincoln Riley	Offensive Coordinator / quarterbacks coach	Texas Tech (2006)	2015
Tim Kish	Inside Linebackers Coach	Otterbein (1976)	2012
Bill Bedenbaugh	Assistant offensive coordinator/offensive line coach	Iowa Wesleyan (1995)	2013
Kerry Cooks	Assistant defensive coordinator/defensive backs coach	Iowa (1993)	2015
Dennis Simmons	Outside Wide Receivers Coach	BYU (1997)	2015
Calvin Thibodeaux	Defensive line coach	Oklahoma (2006)	2016
Merv Johnson	Director of Operations	Missouri (1953)	1979
Jerry Schmidt	Director of Sports Enhancement	Nebraska (1986)	1999
Matt McMillen	Assistant A.D. Football Operations	Kansas State (1985)	1999
Jamarkus McFarland	Graduate assistant	Oklahoma (2013)	2016

=== Roster ===
2016 Oklahoma Sooners Football
Quarterback: 1 Kyler Murray – sophomore (5'10, 195); 3 Connor McGinnis – (redshirt) freshman (6'4, 202); 6 Baker Mayfield – (redshirt) junior (6'1, 212); 9 Tanner Schafer – freshman (6'3, 200); 10 Austin Kendall – freshman (6'1, 210); 14 Reece Clark – (redshirt) freshman (6'4, 199); Tailback: 20 Najee Bissoon – (redshirt) junior (5'5, 158); 23 Abdul Adams – freshman (5'10, 208); 24 Rodney Anderson – (redshirt) freshman (6'0, 211); 25 Joe Mixon – (redshirt) sophomore (6'1, 226); 27 Alex Montgomery – freshman (5'9, 213); 32 Samaje Perine – junior (5'10, 234); 33 Anthony Sheppard – (redshirt) sophomore (5'11, 211); 34 Daniel Brooks – (redshirt) senior (5'8, 184); Wide receiver: 1 Jarvis Baxter – senior (5'11, 165); 5 Geno Lewis – (redshirt) senior (6'1, 201); 8 Mykel Jones – freshman (5'11, 188); 11 Dede Westbrook – senior (6'0, 170); 12 Zach Farrar – freshman (6'3, 204); 13 A.D. Miller – sophomore (6'3, 189); 15 Jeffery Mead – junior (6'5, 187); 16 Michiah Quick – junior (5'11, 183); 17 Jordan Smallwood – (redshirt) junior (6'2, 217); 18 Dahu Green – sophomore (6'4, 201); 80 Sam Iheke – (redshirt) freshman (6'4, 201); 81 Mark Andrews – (redshirt) sophomore (6'5, 244); 82 Ezel McIntee – (redshirt) sophomore (5'10, 203); 83 Nick Basquine – (redshirt) sophomore (5'11, 192); 84 Grant Bothun – (redshirt) senior (5'11, 193); 86 Lee Morris – (redshirt) freshman (6'2, 207); 87 Parker Fentriss – (redshirt) freshman (6'2, 196); 88 Eric DeLay – (redshirt) senior (6'2, 209); 89 Connor Knight – (redshirt) senior (6'4, 248); Adrian Hardy – freshman; Long snappers: 42 Wesley Horky – junior (6'1, 217); 49 Matthew Leckrone – (redshirt) freshman (6'4, 222)	Fullback: 36 Dimitri Flowers – junior (6'2, 239); 44 Jaxon Uhles – (redshirt) junior (5'11, 246); 45 Carson Meier – (redshirt) sophomore (6'5, 245); Offensive lineman: 52 Jamal Danley – OL – (redshirt) senior (6'3, 323); 55 Logan Roberson – OL – freshman (6'3, 341); 58 Erick Wren – OL – senior (6'2, 317); 63 Alex Dalton – C – (redshirt) sophomore (6'3, 290); 64 Dylan Hartsook – OG – (redshirt) senior (6'6, 330); 66 Riley Nolan – OG – (redshirt) senior (6'0, 289); 67 Ashton Julious – OL – (redshirt) junior (6'5, 354); 68 Jonathan Alvarez – OG – junior (6'3, 315); 70 Christian Daimler – OT – (redshirt) junior (6'7, 311); 71 Bobby Evans – OL – (redshirt) freshman (6'4, 299); 72 Ben Powers – OL – sophomore (6'4, 320); 73 Quinn Mittermeier – OL – (redshirt) sophomore (6'5, 265); 74 Cody Ford – OL – (redshirt) freshman (6'3, 317); 75 Dru Samia – OT – sophomore (6'4, 274); 76 Sam Grant – OT – (redshirt) senior (6'6, 275); 77 Erik Swenson – OT – freshman (6'5, 311); 78 Orlando Brown Jr. – OT – (redshirt) junior (6'8, 357); 79 Dwayne Orso-Bacchus – OL – (redshirt) sophomore (6'5, 301); Johncarlo Valentin – OG – freshman; Defensive line: 23 Mark Jackson Jr. – DE – freshman (6'2, 234); 46 Gabriel Campbell – DE – (redshirt) freshman (6'6, 257); 50 Courtney Garnett – DT – (redshirt) sophomore (6'1, 283); 55 Kenneth Mann – DE – (redshirt) freshman (6'3, 255); 57 Du'Vonta Lampkin – DT – (redshirt) freshman (6'4, 332); 59 Kane Snowden – DT – (redshirt) junior (5'11, 240); 72 Amani Bledsoe – DE – freshman (6'5, 270); 87 D.J. Ward – DE – (redshirt) junior (6'2, 250); 90 Neville Gallimore – DT – (redshirt) freshman (6'3, 320); 92 Matthew Romar – DT – (redshirt) junior (6'0, 298); 93 Jordan Wade – DT – (redshirt) senior (6'3, 311); 94 Matt Dimon – DE – senior (6'2, 265); 95 Austin Roberts – DL – senior (6'6, 279); 97 Charles Walker – DL – (redshirt) junior (6'2, 299); 98 Marquise Overton – DT – sophomore (6'1, 292)	Linebacker: 1 Kapri Doucet – junior (6'2, 225); 9 Tay Evans – (redshirt) sophomore (6'2, 239); 14 Emmanuel Beal – junior (6'0, 211); 18 Curtis Bolton – (redshirt) sophomore (6'0, 232); 19 Caleb Kelly – freshman (6'3, 221); 22 Ricky DeBerry – (redshirt) freshman (6'2, 250); 26 Jordan Evans – senior (6'2, 233); 31 Ogbonnia Okoronkwo – (redshirt) junior (6'2, 238); 38 Bryan Mead – freshman (6'2, 223); 40 Jon-Michael Terry – freshman (6'3, 241); 42 Ruben Hunter – (redshirt) junior (6'2, 222); 50 Arthur McGinnis – (redshirt) freshman (6'1, 248); 51 Cade Newhouse-Parker – (redshirt) sophomore (6'0, 223); 96 Dalton Rodriguez – (redshirt) junior (6'6, 232); Defensive backs: 2 P. J. Mbanasor – CB – sophomore (6'1, 190); 3 Jordan Parker – CB – freshman (6'1, 190); 4 Parrish Cobb – CB – freshman (5'11, 170); 5 Antoine Stephens – CB – (redshirt) freshman (6'1, 185); 6 Stanvon Taylor – CB – senior (5'11, 175); 7 Jordan Thomas – CB – junior (6'0, 190); 8 Kahlil Haughton – S – sophomore (6'1, 204); 10 Steven Parker – S – junior (6'1, 205); 12 William Johnson – DB – (redshirt) junior (6'0, 195); 13 Ahmad Thomas – S – senior (6'0, 217); 15 Parnell Motley – CB – freshman (6'0, 172); 21 Will Sunderland – S – sophomore (6'2, 201); 27 Dakota Austin – CB – senior (5'10, 163); 28 Chanse Sylvie – S – freshman (5'11, 187); 29 Prentice McKinney – S – sophomore (6'1, 187); 30 Ernest Gardner – DB – (redshirt) junior (6'0, 178); 35 Ronnie LaRue – DB – (redshirt) sophomore (5'11, 195); 39 Tylon Lynch – DB – junior (6'0, 190); 41 Jesse Walker – S – (redshirt) junior (6'0, 203); 85 Malik Bradshaw – DB – freshman (6'0, 170); Placekicker: 31 Braxton Pickard – freshman (5'9, 215) (+P); 36 Kyle Pfau – (redshirt) sophomore (5'10, 189); 43 Austin Seibert – sophomore (5'10, 214) (+P); 47 Reece Morrison – freshman (6'0, 183)

== Schedule ==
Oklahoma announced their 2016 football schedule on November 24, 2015. The 2016 schedule consists of 6 home games, 4 away games and 2 neutral-site games in the regular season. The Sooners will host two non-conference games against Louisiana–Monroe and Ohio State and travel to Houston, Texas to play Houston in NRG Stadium, a non-conference game at a neutral site. Oklahoma will host Kansas State, Kansas, Baylor and Oklahoma State, and travel to TCU, Texas Tech, Iowa State and West Virginia in regular conference play. Oklahoma will play the Texas Longhorns in Dallas, Texas at the Cotton Bowl stadium on October 8 for the Red River Showdown, the 111th game played of the series.

Date	Time	Opponent	Rank	Site	TV	Result	Attendance
September 3	11:00 a.m.	vs. No. 14 Houston*	No. 3	NRG Stadium; Houston, TX (Texas Kickoff)	ABC	L 23–33	71,016
September 10	6:00 p.m.	Louisiana–Monroe*	No. 14	Gaylord Family Oklahoma Memorial Stadium; Norman, OK	FSN PPV	W 59–17	87,037
September 17	8:00 p.m.	No. 3 Ohio State*	No. 14	Gaylord Family Oklahoma Memorial Stadium; Norman, OK	FOX	L 24–45	87,979
October 1	4:00 p.m.	at No. 21 TCU		Amon G. Carter Stadium; Fort Worth, TX	FOX	W 52–46	45,000
October 8	11:00 a.m.	vs. Texas	No. 20	Cotton Bowl; Dallas, TX (Red River Showdown)	FS1	W 45–40	92,100
October 15	11:00 a.m.	Kansas State	No. 19	Gaylord Family Oklahoma Memorial Stadium; Norman, OK	ESPN	W 38–17	86,049
October 22	7:00 p.m.	at Texas Tech	No. 16	Jones AT&T Stadium; Lubbock, TX	FOX	W 66–59	60,478
October 29	6:00 p.m.	Kansas^{†}	No. 16	Gaylord Family Oklahoma Memorial Stadium; Norman, OK	FS1	W 56–3	86,301
November 3	6:30 p.m.	at Iowa State	No. 14	Jack Trice Stadium; Ames, IA	ESPN	W 34–24	50,662
November 12	11:30 a.m.	Baylor	No. 11	Gaylord Family Oklahoma Memorial Stadium; Norman, OK	ABC/ESPN2	W 45–24	86,249
November 19	7:00 p.m.	at No. 14 West Virginia	No. 9	Mountaineer Field; Morgantown, WV	ABC	W 56–28	57,645
December 3	11:30 a.m.	No. 10 Oklahoma State	No. 9	Gaylord Family Oklahoma Memorial Stadium; Norman, OK (Bedlam Series)	FOX	W 38–20	87,527
January 2, 2017	7:30 p.m.	vs. No. 14 Auburn*	No. 7	Mercedes-Benz Superdome; New Orleans, LA (Sugar Bowl)	ESPN	W 35–19	54,077
*Non-conference game; ^{†}Homecoming; Rankings from AP Poll and CFP Rankings after November 1 released prior to game; All times are in Central time

== Game summaries ==
=== At No. 15 Houston ===
No. 3 Oklahoma Sooners vs No. 15 Houston Cougars – Game summary

Quarter	1	2	3	4	Total
#3 Oklahoma	10	7	0	6	23
#15 Houston	3	16	14	0	33

at NRG Stadium • Houston, TX Texas Kickoff

- Date: September 3, 2016
- Game time: 11:07 a.m. CDT
- Game weather: Temperature: 72 °F (22 °C) • Wind: Calm • Weather: Indoor
- Game attendance: 71,016
- Referee: Referee: Cooper Castleberry, *Umpire: Jim Adams* Linesman: George Gusman * Line Judge: Kelly Deterding * Back Judge: Donnie Aultman * Field Judge: Scott Gaines * Side Judge: Anthony Fleming * Center Judge: Chris Tallent
- TV announcers (ABC): Dave Pasch (Play-by-play), Greg McElroy (color) & Tom Luginbill (sideline)

Game information

First Quarter

- OU 11:43 Joe Mixon 32 yd, Austin Seibert XP Good (OU 7–0)
- HOU 8:13 Ty Cumings 25 yd field goal (OU 7–3)
- OU 6:12 Austin Seibert 25 yd field goal (OU 10–3)

Second Quarter

- HOU 14:56 Ty Cummings 26 yd field goal (OU 10–6)
- HOU 10:12 Duke Catalon 15 yd pass from Greig Ward Jr.; Ty Cummings XP Good (HOU 13–10)
- OU 8:37 Mark Andrews 64 yd pass from Bake Mayfield; Austin Seibert XP Good (OU 17–13)
- HOU 4:33 Ty Cummings 33 yd field goal (OU 17–16)
- HOU 0:00 Ty Cummings 47 yd field goal (HOU 19–17)

Third Quarter

- HOU 8:28 Bradon Wilson 100 yd missed FG return;Ty Cummings XP Good (HOU 26–17)
- HOU 2:15 T. McCloskey 2 yd pass from Greig Ward Jr.; Ty Cummings XP Good (HOU 33–17)

Fourth Quarter

- OU 2:05 Mark Andrews 25 yd pass from Baker Mayfield; Baker Mayfield 2 pt conversion pass failed (HOU 33–23)

Top Passers

- OU – Baker Mayfield 24/33, 323 Yds ,2 TD
- HOU – Greg Ward Jr. 23/40, 321 YD, 2 TD

Top Rushers

- OU– Joe Mixon 6 attempts, 33 yards
- HOU – Duke Catalan 22 attempts, 88 yards

Top Receiving

- OU – Mark Andrews 3 receptions, 94 yards, 2 TD
- HOU – Steven Dunbar 7 receptions, 125 yards

Top Tacklers

- OU– Will Johnson 10 tackles
- HOU – Brandon Wilson 10 tackles

=== vs Louisiana–Monroe ===
Louisiana–Monroe at No. 14 Oklahoma Sooners – Game summary

Quarter	1	2	3	4	Total
Louisiana–Monroe	0	0	17	0	17
#14 Oklahoma	21	21	3	14	59

at Gaylord Family Oklahoma Memorial Stadium • Norman, Oklahoma

- Date: September 10, 2016
- Game time: 6:06 p.m. CDT
- Game weather: Temperature: 77 °F (25 °C) • Wind:N 16 • Weather: Clear
- Game attendance: 87,037
- Referee: Referee: Brandon Cruse, *Umpire: Marlo Fitzgerald, *Linesman: Bradford Edwards, * Line Judge: Quentin Givens, * Back Judge: Daniel Young, * Field Judge: Rich Almeroth, * Side Judge: Tuta Salaam, * Center Judge: Vijay Madduri
- TV announcers (FSOK PPV): Brendan Burke (Play-by-play), Brian Baldinger (color) & Christian Steckel (sideline)

Game information

First Quarter

- OU – 12:53 Mark Andrews 39 yd pass from Baker Mayfield; Austin Seibert XP Good (OU 7–0)
- OU – 8:17 Dimitri Flowers 8 yd pass from Baker Mayfield; Austin Seibert XP Good (OU 14–0)
- OU – 3:07 Samaje Perine 1 yd run; Austin Seibert XP Good (OU 21–0)

Second Quarter

- OU – 14:49 Jarvis Baxter 40 yd run; Austin Seibert XP Good (OU 28–0)
- OU – 9:17 Nick Basquine 62 yd pass from Baker Mayfield; Austin Seibert XP Good (OU 35–0)
- OU – 1:03 Samje Perine 5 yd run; Austin Seibert XP Good (OU 42–0)

Third Quarter

- ULM – 13:41 RJ Turner 73 yd pass from Garrett Smith; Craig Ford XP Good (OU 42–7)
- OU – 9:41 Austin Seibert 39 yd field goal (OU 45–7)
- ULM – 7:50 Alec Osborne 43 yd pass from Garrett Smith; Craig Ford XP Good (OU 45–14)
- ULM – 3:06 Craig Ford 42 yd field goal (OU 45–17)

Fourth Quarter

- OU – 9:26 A.D. Miller 3 yd pass from Austin Kendall; Austin Seibert XP Good (OU 52–17)
- OU – 7:01 Jeffery Mead 6 yd pass from Austin Kendall; Austin Seibert XP Good (OU 59-17)

Top Passers

- ULM – Garrett Smith 22/35, 251 yds, 2 TD
- OU – Baker Mayfield 14/20, 244 yds, 3 TD

Top Rushers

- ULM – Ben Luckett 9 attempts, 34 yds
- OU – Joe Mixon 18 attempts, 91 yds

Top Receiving

- ULM – R.J. Turner 7 attempts, 135 yds, 1 TD
- OU – Nick Basquine 3 attempts, 80 yds 1 TD

Top Tacklers

- ULM – Tre' Hunter 10 tackles
- OU – Jordan Evans 10 tackles

=== vs No. 3 Ohio State ===
No. 3 Ohio State Buckeyes at No. 14 Oklahoma Sooners – Game summary

Quarter	1	2	3	4	Total
#3 Ohio State	14	21	7	3	45
#14 Oklahoma	7	10	7	0	24

at Gaylord Family Oklahoma Memorial Stadium • Norman, Oklahoma

- Date: September 16, 2016
- Game time: 8:02 p.m. CDT
- Game weather: Temperature: 66 °F (19 °C) • Wind ESE 7: • Weather: Partly Cloudy
- Game attendance: 87,979
- Referee: Referee: John O'Neill, *Umpire: Robert Colosimo, * Linesman: Tripp Sutter, *Line Judge: William Krispinsky, *Back Judge: Michael Elliott, *Field Judge: Terry Anderson, *Side Judge: Stephen Hassell
- TV announcers (FOX): Gus Johnson (Play-by-Play), Joel Klatt (Color) & Shannon Spake (Sideline)

Game information

First Quarter

- OHST– 7:28 Curtis Samuel 36 yd run; Tyler Durbin XP Good (OHST 7–0)
- OHST– 4:34 Jerome Baker 68 yd interception return; Tyler Durbin XP Good (OHST 14–0)
- OU –4:20 Joe Mixon 97 yd kick off return; Austin Siebert XP Good (OHST 14–7)

Second Quarter

- OHST– 14:20 Noah Brown 4 yd pass from J.T. Barrett; Tyler Durbin XP Good (OHST 21–7)
- OU– 11:04 Austin Seibert 26 yd field goal (OHST 21–10)
- OHST– 6:02 Noah Brown 37 yd pass from J.T. Barrett; Tyler Durbin XP Good (OHST 28–10)
- OU– 4:12 A.D. Miller 35 yd pass from Baker Mayfield; Austin Seibert XP Good (OHST 28–17)
- OHST– 0:06 Noah Brown 21 yd pass from J.T. Barrett; Tyler Durbin XP Good (OHST 35–17)

Third Quarter

- OHST– 10:39 Noah Brown 8 yd pass from J.T. Barrett; Tyler Durbin XP Good (OHST 42–17)
- OU – 4:06 Mark Andrews 5 yd pass from Baker Mayfield; Austin Seibert XP Good (OHST 42–24)

Fourth Quarter

- OHST– 10:33 Tyler Durbin 31 yd field goal (OHST 45–24)

Top Passers

- OHST– J.T. Barrett 14/20, 152 yds, 4 TD
- OU– Baker Mayfield 17/32, 226 yds, 2 TD

Top Rushers

- OHST– Mike Weber 18 attempts, 123 yds
- OU – Semaje Perine 17 attempts, 60 yds

Top Receiving

- OHST– Noah Brown 5 attempts, 72 yds,4 TD
- OU –Dede Westbrook 5 attempts, 51 yds

Top Tacklers

- OHST– Chris Worley 10 tackles
- OU –Michiah Quick 8 tackles

Kickoff was delayed from the original start time of 6:30 p.m. to 8:00 p.m. due to lightning and thunderstorms in the vicinity of the University of Oklahoma.

=== At No. 21 TCU ===
Oklahoma Sooners at No. 21 TCU Horned Frogs – Game Summary

Quarter	1	2	3	4	Total
Oklahoma	7	28	14	3	52
#21 TCU	21	3	0	22	46

at Amon G. Carter Stadium • Fort Worth, Texas

- Date: October 1, 2016
- Game time: 4:05 p.m. CDT
- Game weather: Temperature: 82 °F (28 °C) • Wind SE 4: • Weather: Sunny
- Game attendance: 47,851
- Referee: Referee: Mike Defee, *Umpire: Robert Richeson, * Linesman: AL Green, *Line Judge: Derek Anderson, *Back Judge: Terry Jones, *Field Judge: Joe Blubaugh, * Side Judge: Lo Van Pham
- TV announcers (FOX): Gus Johnson (Play-By-Play), Joel Klatt (Color), & Shannon Spake (Sideline)

Game information

First Quarter

- TCU 14:11 – Jaelan Austin 18 yd pass from Kenny Hill; Brandon Hatfield XP Good (TCU 7–0)
- OU 7:39 – Baker Mayfield 4 yd run; Austin Seibert XP Good (OU 7–7)
- TCU 5:29 – Cole Hunt 3 yd pass from Kenny Hill; Brandon Hatfield XP Good (TCU 14–7)
- TCU 2:42 – Kyle Hicks 61 yd pass from Kenny Hill; Brandon Hatfield XP Good (TCU 21–7)

Second Quarter

- OU 14:54 – Baker Mayfield 9 yd run; Austin Seibert XP Good (TCU 21–14)
- OU 11:23 – Samaje Perine 8 yd run; Austin Seibert XP Good (OU 21–21)
- OU 7:21 – Dede Westbrook 67 yd pass from Baker Mayfield; Austin Seibert XP Good (OU 28–21)
- OU 3:30 – Dede Westbrook 40 yd pass from Baker Mayfield; Austin Seibert XP Good (OU 35–21)
- TCU 0:00 – Brandon Hatfield 23 yd field goal (OU 35–24)

Third Quarter

- OU 12:20 – Joe Mixon 2 yd run; Austin Seibert XP Good (OU 42–24
- OU 4:11 – Samaje Perine 1 yd run; Austin Seibert XP Good (OU 49–24)

Fourth Quarter

- TCU 14:29 – Taj Williams 64 yd pass from Kenny Hill; Brandon Hatfield XP Good (OU 49–31)
- TCU 8:08 – Kyle Hicks 2 yd run; Brandon Hatfield XP Good (OU 49–38)
- TCU 5:36 – Taj Williams 74 yd pass from Kenny Hill; Porter Hill pass from Kenny Hill (OU 49–45)
- OU 1:55 – Austin Seibert 35 yd field goal (OU 52–46)

Top Passers

- OU – Baker Mayfield 23/30, 274 yds, 2 TD
- TCU – Kenny Hill 26/44, 448 yds, 5 TD

Top Rushers

- OU– Joe Mixon 16 attempts, 109 yds, 1 TD
- TCU – Kyle Hicks 15 attempts 64 yds, 1 TD

Top Receiving

- OU – Dede Westbrook 7 attempts, 158 yds, 2 TD
- TCU – Kyle Hicks 6 attempts, 81 yds, 1 TD

Top Tacklers

- OU – Jordan Evans 10 tackles
- TCU – Ty Summers 13 tackles

=== vs Texas ===
Texas Longhorns vs No. 20 Oklahoma Sooners – Game Summary

Quarter	1	2	3	4	Total
Texas	3	10	14	13	40
#20 Oklahoma	7	7	21	10	45

at Cotton Bowl • Dallas, Texas

- Date: October 8, 2016
- Game time: 11:06 a.m. CDT
- Game weather: Temperature: 65 °F (18 °C) • Wind: No Wind • Weather: Sunny
- Game attendance: 92,100
- Referee: Referee: Reggie Smith, *Umpire: Tab Slaughter, *Linesman: Mike Moeller, *Line Judge: Mark Stewart, *Back Judge: Lyndon Nixon, *Field Judge: Matt Mills, *Side Judge: Tim Murray
- TV announcers (FS1): Gus Johnson (Play-By-Play), Joel Klatt (Color) & Shannon Spake (Sideline)

Game information

First Quarter

- UT 5:21– Trent Domingue 33 yd FG (UT 3–0)
- OU 1:43 – Samaje Perine 2 yd run; Austin Seibert XP Good (OU 7–3)

Second Quarter

- UT 14:21 – D'Onta Foreman 1 yd run; Trent Domingue XP Good (UT 10–7)
- OU 4:02 – Dede Westbrook 71 yd pass from Baker Mayfield; Austin Seibert XP Good (OU 14–10)
- UT 0:00 – Trent Domingue 28 FG (OU 14–13)

Third Quarter

- UT 13:47 – Devin Duvernay 63 yd pass from Shane Buechele; Trent Domingue XP Good (UT 20–14)
- OU 12:49 – Dede Westbrook 42 yd pass from Baker Mayfield; Austin Seibert XP Good (OU 21–20)
- UT 10:43 – Dorian Leonard 45 yd pass from Shane Buechele; Trent Domingue XP Good (UT 27–21)
- OU 8:13 – Baker Mayfield 4 yd run; Austin Seibert XP Good (OU 28–27)
- OU 5:39 – Dede Westbrook 47 yd pass from Baker Mayfield; Austin Seibert XP Good (OU 35–27)

Fourth Quarter

- OU 11:53 – Samaje Perine 3 yd run; Austin Seibert XP Good (OU 42–27)
- UT 10:34 – Armant Foreman 10 yd pass from Shane Buechele; Trent Domingue XP Good (OU 42–34)
- OU 2:36 – Austin Seibert 39 yd FG (OU 45–34)
- UT 1:45 – D'Onta Foreman 22 yd run (OU 45–40) 2 Point Pass Failed

Top Passers

- UT– Shane Buechele 19/36, 245 yds, 3 TD
- OU – Baker Mayfield 22/31, 390 yds, 3 TD

Top Rushers

- UT – D'Onta Foreman 25 attempts, 160 yds, 2 TD
- OU – Samaje Perine 35 attempts, 214 yds, 2 TD

Top Receiving

- UT– Armant Foreman 5 attempts, 28 yds, 1 TD
- OU – Dede Westbrook 10 attempts, 232 yds, 3 TD

Top Tacklers

- UT– Anthon Wheeler 13 tackles
- OU – Ogbonnia Okoronkwo 11 tackles

=== vs Kansas State ===
Kansas State Wildcats @ No. 19 Oklahoma Sooners – Game Summary

Quarter	1	2	3	4	Total
Kansas State	0	10	0	7	17
#19 Oklahoma	14	10	7	7	38

at Gaylord Family Oklahoma Memorial Stadium • Norman OK

- Date: October 15, 2016
- Game time: 11:01 a.m. CDT
- Game weather: 75 °F (24 °C) • Wind:S 21 • Weather: Partly Sunny
- Game attendance: 86,049
- Referee: Referee: Brad Van Vark, *Umpire: Michael Cooper, *Linesman: George Gusman, *Line Judge: Frank LeBlanc, *Back Judge: Brian Ernest, *Field Judge: Jason Ledet, *Side Judge: Gene Semko
- TV announcers (ESPN): Mark Jones (Play-By-Play), Rod Gilmore (Color) & Quint Kessenich (Sideline)

Game information

First Quarter

- OU 12:24– Samaje Perine 25 yd pass from Baker Mayfield; Austin Seibert XP Good (OU 7–0)
- OU 6:00 – Joe Mixon 8 yd pass from Baker Mayfield; Austin Seibert XP Good (OU 14–0)

Second Quarter

- KS 12:28 – Jesse Ertz 2 yd run; Matthew McCrane XP Good (OU 14–7)
- OU 10:39 – Dede Westbrook 26 yd pass from Joe Mixon; Austin Seibert XP Good (OU 21–7)
- KS 7:41 – Matthew McCrane 25 yd field goal (OU 21–10)
- OU 0:16 – Austin Seibert 34 yd field goal (OU 24–10)

Third Quarter

- OU 1:08 – Dede Westbrook 8 yd pass from Baker Mayfield; Austin Seibert XP Good (OU 31–10)

Fourth Quarter

- KS 12:40 – Dominique Heath 54 yd pass from Joe Hubener; Matthew McCrane XP Good (OU 31–17)
- OU 6:31 – Dede Westbrook 88 yd pass from Baker Mayfield; Austin Seibert XP Good (OU 38–17)

Top Passing

- KS – Joe Hubener 12/23, 157 yds, 1 TD
- OU – Baker Mayfield 25/31, 346 yds, 4 TD

Top Rushers

- KS – Jesse Ertz 7 attempts, 40 yds, 1 TD
- OU – Joe Mixon 19 attempts, 88 yds

Top Receiving

- KS – Dominique Heath 7 attempts, 101 yds, 1 TD
- OU – Dede Westbrook 9 attempts, 184 yds, 3 TD

Top Tacklers

- KS – Kendall Adams 11 tackles
- OU – Steven Parker 8 tackles

=== At Texas Tech ===
No. 16 Oklahoma Sooners @ Texas Tech Red Raiders – Game Summary

Quarter	1	2	3	4	Total
#16 Oklahoma	13	17	21	15	66
Texas Tech	10	14	14	21	59

at Jones AT&T Stadium • Lubbock, Texas

- Date: October 22, 2016
- Game time: 7:10 p.m. CDT
- Game weather: 77 °F (25 °C) • Wind:SSW 10 • Weather: Clear
- Game attendance: 60,478
- Referee: Referee:Cooper Castleberry, *Umpire: Jim Adams, *Linesman: Carl McNeil, *Line Judge: Mark Stewart, *Back Judge: Donnie Aultman, *Field Judge: Scott Gaines, *Side Judge: Anthony Fleming
- TV announcers (FOX): Joe Davis (Play-By-Play), Brady Quinn (Color) & Bruce Feldman (Sideline)

Game information

First Quarter

- OU 13:23 – Joe Mixon 56 yd pass from Baker Mayfield; Austin Seibert XP No Good (OU 6–0)
- OU 11:28 – Dede Westbrook 49 yd pass from Baker Mayfield; Austin Seibert XP Good (OU 13–0)
- TTU 7:23 – Da'Leon Ward 4 yd run; Clayton Hatfield XP Good (OU 13–7)
- TTU 1:06 – Clayton Hatfield 37 yd field goal (OU 13–10)

Second Quarter

- OU 13:31 – Joe Mixon 46 yd run; Austin Seibert XP Good (OU 20–10)
- TTU 9:06 – Patrick Mahomes 11 yd run; Clayton Hatfield XP Good (OU 20–17)
- OU 6:14 – Austin Seibert 23 yd field goal (OU 23–17)
- TTU 0:37 – Jonathan Giles 23 yd pass from Patrick Mahomes; Clayton Hatfield XP Good (TTU 24-23)
- OU 0:17 – Nick Basquine 23 yd pass from Baker Mayfield; Austin Seibert XP Good (OU 30–24)

Third Quarter

- OU 11:51 – Dede Westbrook 23 yd pass from Baker Mayfield; Austin Seibert XP Good (OU 37–24)
- TTU 9:33 – Reginald Davis 32 yd pass from Patrick Mahomes; Clayton Hatfield XP Good (OU 37–31)
- OU 7:59 – Joe Mixon 43 yd pass from Baker Mayfield; Austin Seibert XP Good (OU 44–31)
- TTU 4:10 – Johnathan Giles 41 yd pass from Patrick Mahomes; Clayton Hatfield XP Good (OU 44–38)
- OU 1:36 – Dimitri Flowers 34 yd pass from Baker Mayfield; Austin Seibert XP Good (OU 51–38)

Fourth Quarter

- TTU 12:57 – Patrick Mahomes 22 yd run; Clayton Hatfield XP Good (OU 51–45)
- OU 9:15 – Joe Mixon 15 yd pass from Baker Mayfield; PAT Pass by Dede Westbrook from Baker Mayfield (OU 59–45)
- TTU 7:56 – Keke Coutee 56 yd pass from Patrick Mahomes; Clayton Hatfield XP Good (OU 59–52)
- OU 5:03 – Joe Mixon 42 yd run; Austin Seibert XP Good (OU 66–52)
- TTU 1:38 – Cameron Batson 3 yd pass from Patrick Mahomes; Clayton Hatfield XP Good (OU 66–59)

Top Passers

- OU– Baker Mayfield 27/36, 545 yds, 7 TD
- TTU – Patrick Mahomes 52/88, 734 yds, 5 TD

Top Rushers

- OU – Joe Mixon 31 attempts, 263 yds, 2 TD
- TTU – Patrick Mahomes 12 attempts, 85 yds, 2 TD

Top Receiving

- OU – Dede Westbrook 9 attempts, 202 yds, 2 TD
- TTU –Keke Coutee 10 attempts, 172 yds, 1 TD

Top Tacklers

- OU – Ahmad Thomas 11 tackles
- TTU –Malik Jenkins 14 tackles

=== Kansas ===
Kansas Jayhawks @ No. 16 Oklahoma Sooners – Game Summary

Quarter	1	2	3	4	Total
Kansas	3	0	0	0	3
#16 Oklahoma	7	21	28	0	56

at Gaylord Family Oklahoma Memorial Stadium • Norman, Oklahoma

- Date: October 29, 2016
- Game time: 6:06 p.m. CDT
- Game weather: 80 °F (27 °C) • Wind:SSW 23 • Weather: Clear
- Game attendance: 86,301
- Referee: Referee: Brandon Cruse, *Umpire Marlow Fitzgera, *Linesman: B.Edwards, *Line Judge: Quintin Givens, *Back Judge: Daniel Young. *Field Judge: Rich Almeroth, *Side Judge: Tuta Salaam
- TV announcers (FS1): Brian Custer (Play-By-Play) & Petros Papadakis (Color)

Game information

First Quarter

- OU 9:56 – Dede Westbrook 71 yd punt; Austin Seibert XP Good (OU 7–0)
- KU 3:32 – Matthew Wyman 23 yd FG (OU 7–3)

Second Quarter

- OU 10:22 – Dede Westbrook 41 yd pass from Baker Mayfield; Austin Seibert XP Good (OU 14–3)
- OU 3:35 – Mark Andrews 15 yd pass from Baker Mayfield; Austin Seibert XP Good (OU 21–3)
- OU 0:20 – Dimitri Flowers 9 yd pass from Baker Mayfield; Austin Seibert XP Good (OU 28–3)

Third Quarter

- OU 11:09 – Joe Mixon 1 yd run; Austin Seibert XP Good (OU 35–3)
- OU 8:50 – Geno Lewis 7 yd pass from Baker Mayfield; Austin Seibert XP Good (42–3)
- OU 7:58 – Jordan Evans 33 yd INT; Austin Seibert XP Good (OU 49–3)
- OU 2:30 –Devin Montgomery 10 yd run; Austin Seibert XP Good (OU 56–3)

Top Passers

- KU– Monte Cozart 20/36, 120 yds
- OU – Baker Mayfield 16/24, 236 yds, 4 TD

Top Rushers

- KU – Ke'aun Kinner 10 attempts, 23 yds
- OU – Abdul Adams 13 attempts, 94 yds

Top Receiving

- KU – Steven Sims 5 attempts, 35 yds
- OU – Dede Westbrook 5 attempts, 105 yds, 1 TD

Top Tacklers

- KU – Fish Smithson 9 tackles
- OU – Jordan Evans 10 tackles

=== Iowa State ===
Oklahoma Sooners @ Iowa State Cyclones – Game Summary

Quarter	1	2	3	4	Total
#12 Oklahoma	14	14	3	3	34
Iowa State	3	14	0	7	24

at Jack Trice Stadium • Ames, Iowa

- Date: November 3, 2016
- Game time: 6:33 p.m. CST
- Game weather: 65 °F (18 °C) • Wind:NW 5 • Weather: Clear
- Game attendance: 50,662
- Referee: Referee: Dan Romeo, *Umpire: Scott Teifer, *Linesman: Andy Warner, *Line Judge: Marc Bovios, *Back Judge: Chris Alston, * Field Judge: Ed Vinzant, *Side Judge: Jim Murphy, * Center Judge: Ken Ray
- TV announcers (ESPN): Dave Flemming (Play-by-Play), Jesse Palmer (color) & Laura Rutledge (sideline)

Game information

First Quarter

- OU 12:31 – Mark Andrews 6 yd pass from Baker Mayfield; Austin Seibert XP Good (OU 7–0)
- ISU 4:22– Cole Netten 28 yd field goal (OU 7–3)
- OU 1:22– Jeffery Mead 30 yd pass from Baker Mayfield; Austin Seibert XP Good (OU 14–3)

Second Quarter

- ISU 11:15– Allen Lazard 31 yd pass from Jacob Park; Cole Natten XP Good (OU 14–10)
- ISU 4:30– Joel Lanning 41 yd run; Cole Natten XP Good (ISU 17–14)
- OU 4:16– Dede Westbrook 65 yd pass from Baker Mayfield; Austin Seibert XP Good (OU 21–17)
- OU 0:06 – Dimitri Flowers 11 yd pass from Baker Mayfield; Austin Seibert XP Good (OU 28–17)

Third Quarter

- OU 5:50 – Austin Seibert 36 yd field goal (OU 31–17)

Fourth Quarter

- ISU 13:04– Dondre Daley 23 yd pass from Jacob Park; Cole Netten XP Good (OU 31–24)
- OU 7:05 – Austin Seibert 35 yd field goal (OU 34–24)

Top Passers

- OU– Baker Mayfield 25/34, 328 yds, 4 TD
- ISU – Jacob Park 16/29, 160 yds, 2 TD

Top Rushers

- OU– Dimitri Flowers 22 attempts 119 yds
- ISU – Joel Lanning 7 attempts 61 yds, 1 TD

Top Receiving

- OU – Dede Westbrook 7 attempts, 131 yds, 1 TD
- ISU – Allen Lazzard 6 attempts, 76 yds, 1 TD

Top Tacklers

- OU – DJ Ward 7 tackles
- ISU – Willie Harvey 9 tackles

=== Baylor ===
#25 Baylor Bears @ #9 Oklahoma Sooners – Game Summary

Quarter	1	2	3	4	Total
#25 Baylor	0	10	7	7	24
#9 Oklahoma	14	7	14	10	45

at Gaylord Family Oklahoma Memorial Stadium • Norman, Oklahoma

- Date: November 12, 2016
- Game time: 11:06 a.m. CST
- Game attendance: 86,429
- Referee: Referee: Reggie Smith; *Umpire: Tab Slaughter; *Linesman: Mike Moeller; *Line Judge: Mark Stewart; *Back Judge: Lyndon Nixon; *Field Judge: Matt Mills; *Side Judge: Tim Murray
- TV announcers (ABC/ESPN2): Mike Patrick (Play-by-Play), Ed Cunningham (Color) & Dr. Jerry Punch (Sideline)

Game information

First Quarter

- OU 11:11 – Baker Mayfield 15 yd run; Austin Seibert XP Good (OU 7–0)
- OU 5:17 – Dede Westbrook 29 yd pass from Baker Mayfield; Austin Seibert XP Good (OU 14–0)

Second Quarter

- OU 12:45– Semaje Perine 4 yd run;Austin Seibert XP Good (OU 21–0)
- BU 7:28 – Chris Callahan 35 yd field goal (OU 21–3)
- BU 2:14 – KD Cannon 24 yd pass from Seth Russell; Chris Callahan XP Good (OU 21–10)

Third Quarter

- OU 9:45 – Dede Westbrook 40 yd pass from Baker Mayfield; Austin Seibert XP Good (OU 28–10)
- OU 8:55 – Samaje Perine 1 yd run; Austin Seibert XP Good (OU 35–10)
- BU 4:15 – Zach Smith 1 yd run; Chris Callahan XP Good (OU 35–17)

Fourth Quarter

- OU 13:31– Joe Mixon 56 yd run; Austin Seibert XP Good (OU 42–17)
- BU 13:13 – KD Cannon 62 yd pass from Zach Smith;Chris Callahan (OU 42–24)
- OU 4:38 – Austin Seibert 22 yd field goal (OU 45–24)

=== West Virginia ===
#8 Oklahoma Sooners @ #10 West Virginia Mountaineers – Game Summary

Quarter	1	2	3	4	Total
#8 Oklahoma	21	13	7	15	56
#10 West Virginia	0	7	7	14	28

at Mountaineer Field • Morgantown, West Virginia

- Date: November 19, 2016
- Game time: 7:08 p.m. CST
- Game weather: 36 °F (2 °C) • Wind:W14 • Weather: Snow flurries
- Game attendance: 57,645
- Referee: Referee: Cooper Castleberry, *Umpire: Jim Adams, *Linesman: Carl McNeill, *Line Judge: Kelly Deterding, *Back Judge: Donnie Aultman, *Field Judge: Scott Gaines, *Side Judge: Anthony Fleming
- TV announcers (ABC): Chris Fowler (Play-by-Play), Kirk Herbstreit (Color) & Sam Ponder (Sideline)

=== Oklahoma State ===
# 11 Oklahoma State Cowboys @ # 7 Oklahoma Sooners (Bedlam Series)– Game Summary

Quarter	1	2	3	4	Total
#11 Oklahoma State	3	14	3	0	20
#7 Oklahoma	0	17	14	7	38

at Gaylord Family Oklahoma Memorial Stadium • Norman, Oklahoma

- Date: December 3, 2016
- Game time: 11:35 a.m.
- Game attendance: 87,527
- Referee: Referee: Brad Van Vark, *Umpire: Michael Cooper, *Linesman: George Gusman, *Line Judge: Kelly Deterding, *Back Judge: Joel Wetzel, *Field Judge: Jason Ledet, *Side Judge: Gene Semko
- TV announcers (FOX): Tim Brando (Play-By-Play), Spencer Tillman (Color) & Bruce Feldman (Sideline)

=== Auburn (Sugar Bowl) ===
# 14 Auburn Tigers vs #7 Oklahoma Sooners – Game summary

Quarter	1	2	3	4	Total
#14 Auburn	7	6	0	6	19
#7 Oklahoma	0	14	14	7	35

at Mercedes-Benz Superdome • New Orleans

- Date: January 2, 2017
- Game time: 7:50 p.m. CST
- Game attendance: 54,077
- Referee: Referee:John O'Neill* Umpire:Jim Shaw* Linesman:Tripp Sutter* Line Judge:John Quinn* Back Judge:Kevin Schwarzel* Field Judge:Terry Anderson* Side Judge:John Hayes
- TV announcers (ESPN): Brent Musburger (play-by-play), Jesse Palmer (analyst), Kaylee Hartung (sideline reporter)

== Rankings ==
Ranking movements Legend: ██ Increase in ranking ██ Decrease in ranking RV = Received votes ( ) = First-place votes
	Week															
Poll	Pre	1	2	3	4	5	6	7	8	9	10	11	12	13	14	Final
AP	3 (4)	14	14	25	RV	20	19	16	16	12	9	8	7	7	7	5
Coaches	3	13	14	RV	RV	22	20	16	15	11	9	8	7	7	7	3
CFP	Not released									14	11	9	8	9	7	Not released

== 2017 NFL draft ==
The 2017 NFL draft was held in front of the Philadelphia Museum of Art in Philadelphia on April 27–29, 2017. The following Oklahoma players were either selected or signed as free agents following the draft.

Player	Position	Round	Overall pick	NFL team
Joe Mixon	RB	2nd	48	Cincinnati Bengals
Dede Westbrook	WR	4th	110	Jacksonville Jaguars
Samaje Perine	RB	4th	114	Washington Redskins
Jordan Evans	LB	6th	193	Cincinnati Bengals
Ahmad Thomas	S	Undrafted		Oakland Raiders
Jordan Wade	DT	Undrafted		Oakland Raiders
Charles Walker	DT	Undrafted		New Orleans Saints
Geno Lewis	WR	Undrafted		Cincinnati Bengals
