= 2018 Oklahoma Sooners football team =

American college football season

2018 Oklahoma Sooners football

Big 12 champion

Big 12 Championship, W 39–27 vs. Texas

Orange Bowl (CFP Semifinal), L 34–45 vs. Alabama
- Conference: Big 12 Conference

Ranking
- Coaches: No. 4
- AP: No. 4
- Record: 12–2 (8–1 Big 12)
- Head coach: Lincoln Riley (2nd season)
- Co-offensive coordinators: Cale Gundy (2nd season); Bill Bedenbaugh (2nd season)
- Offensive scheme: Air raid
- Defensive coordinator: Mike Stoops (12th season; first 6 games); Ruffin McNeill (interim; remainder of season)
- Base defense: 3–4
- Captains: Rodney Anderson; Kenneth Mann; Kenneth Murray; Ben Powers; Austin Seibert
- Home stadium: Gaylord Family Oklahoma Memorial Stadium

2018 Big 12 Conference football standings
| | Conf. | | | Overall |
| Team | W | | L | W | | L |
|---|---|---|---|---|---|---|
| No. 4 Oklahoma y$^ | 8 | – | 1 | 12 | – | 2 |
| No. 9 Texas y | 7 | – | 2 | 10 | – | 4 |
| Iowa State | 6 | – | 3 | 8 | – | 5 |
| No. 20 West Virginia | 6 | – | 3 | 8 | – | 4 |
| TCU | 4 | – | 5 | 7 | – | 6 |
| Baylor | 4 | – | 5 | 7 | – | 6 |
| Oklahoma State | 3 | – | 6 | 7 | – | 6 |
| Kansas State | 3 | – | 6 | 5 | – | 7 |
| Texas Tech | 3 | – | 6 | 5 | – | 7 |
| Kansas | 1 | – | 8 | 3 | – | 9 |
Championship: Oklahoma 39, Texas 27
^ – College Football Playoff participant; $ – Conference champion; y – Championship game participant; Rankings from AP Poll

The 2018 Oklahoma Sooners football team represented the University of Oklahoma in the 2018 NCAA Division I FBS football season, the 124th season for the Oklahoma Sooners. The team is led by Lincoln Riley, who is in his second year as head coach. They play their home games at Gaylord Family Oklahoma Memorial Stadium in Norman, Oklahoma. They are a charter member of the Big 12 Conference.

Conference play began with a 37–27 win against Iowa State in Ames, Iowa and ended with a 59–56 win against West Virginia in Morgantown, West Virginia. Oklahoma finished conference play with the best record in the conference with an 8–1 record. They went on to play Texas in the 2018 Big 12 Championship Game, which they won 39–27 to win their twelfth, and fourth consecutive, Big 12 championship.

In the final College Football Playoff rankings of the season, Oklahoma was ranked fourth, earning them a spot in the 2018 Orange Bowl, in a national semi-final game against first-seeded Alabama. This was Oklahoma's second consecutive and third overall CFP bid. The Sooners lost to the Crimson Tide, 34–45, marking the sixth consecutive loss for the school in CFP semi-finals or BCS national championship games.

Sooners quarterback Kyler Murray, following in the wake of Heisman Trophy winner Baker Mayfield, earned several national honors himself, including winning the school's second consecutive and seventh overall Heisman Trophy. This was the first time that quarterbacks from the same school won the award in back to back seasons.

== Recruiting ==
=== Recruits ===
The Sooners signed a total of 22 recruits.

College recruiting (2018)
| Name | Hometown | School | Height | Weight | Commit date |
|---|---|---|---|---|---|
| Brey Walker; OT | Moore, Oklahoma | Southmoore High School | 6 ft 7 in (2.01 m) | 320 lb (150 kg) | Nov 28, 2015 |
| Brey Walker; OT | Recruit ratings: Scout: Rivals: 247Sports: ESPN: | | | | |
| Patrick Fields; S | Tulsa, Oklahoma | Union High School | 6 ft 0 in (1.83 m) | 190 lb (86 kg) | Mar 5, 2017 |
| Patrick Fields; S | Recruit ratings: Scout: Rivals: 247Sports: ESPN: | | | | |
| T.J. Pledger; RB | West Hills, California | IMG Academy | 5 ft 8 in (1.73 m) | 190 lb (86 kg) | Mar 25, 2017 |
| T.J. Pledger; RB | Recruit ratings: Scout: Rivals: 247Sports: ESPN: | | | | |
| Jordan Kelley; DT | Tulsa, Oklahoma | Union High School | 6 ft 3 in (1.91 m) | 293 lb (133 kg) | Mar 26, 2017 |
| Jordan Kelley; DT | Recruit ratings: Scout: Rivals: 247Sports: ESPN: | | | | |
| Miguel Edwards; CB | Deerfield Beach, Florida | Deerfield Beach High School | 6 ft 0 in (1.83 m) | 164 lb (74 kg) | Apr 28, 2017 |
| Miguel Edwards; CB | Recruit ratings: Scout: Rivals: 247Sports: ESPN: | | | | |
| Starrland Baldwin; CB | Houston, Texas | Cypress Falls High School | 5 ft 10 in (1.78 m) | 172 lb (78 kg) | May 11, 2017 |
| Starrland Baldwin; CB | Recruit ratings: Scout: Rivals: 247Sports: ESPN: | | | | |
| Tanner Mordecai; QB | Waco, Texas | Midway High School | 6 ft 2 in (1.88 m) | 197 lb (89 kg) | Jun 1, 2017 |
| Tanner Mordecai; QB | Recruit ratings: Scout: Rivals: 247Sports: ESPN: | | | | |
| Ron Tatum; DE | Oklahoma City, Oklahoma | Putnam City High School | 6 ft 5 in (1.96 m) | 269 lb (122 kg) | Jun 12, 2017 |
| Ron Tatum; DE | Recruit ratings: Scout: Rivals: 247Sports: ESPN: | | | | |
| Tramonda Moore; OT | Oklahoma City, Oklahoma | Independence Community College | 6 ft 6 in (1.98 m) | 330 lb (150 kg) | Jun 18, 2017 |
| Tramonda Moore; OT | Recruit ratings: Scout: Rivals: 247Sports: ESPN: | | | | |
| Kundarrius Taylor; WR | Memphis, Tennessee | Ridgeway High School | 6 ft 3 in (1.91 m) | 200 lb (91 kg) | Jun 23, 2017 |
| Kundarrius Taylor; WR | Recruit ratings: Scout: Rivals: 247Sports: ESPN: | | | | |
| Jaylon Robinson; WR | Fort Worth, Texas | All Saints' Episcopal School | 5 ft 10 in (1.78 m) | 170 lb (77 kg) | Jun 26, 2017 |
| Jaylon Robinson; WR | Recruit ratings: Scout: Rivals: 247Sports: ESPN: | | | | |
| Jaquayln Crawford; WR | Rockdale, Texas | Rockdale High School | 5 ft 10 in (1.78 m) | 163 lb (74 kg) | Jul 17, 2017 |
| Jaquayln Crawford; WR | Recruit ratings: Scout: Rivals: 247Sports: ESPN: | | | | |
| Jalen Redmond; DE | Midwest City, Oklahoma | Midwest City High School | 6 ft 4 in (1.93 m) | 233 lb (106 kg) | Jul 29, 2017 |
| Jalen Redmond; DE | Recruit ratings: Scout: Rivals: 247Sports: ESPN: | | | | |
| Darrell Simpson; OT | Justin, Texas | Northwest High School | 6 ft 7 in (2.01 m) | 336 lb (152 kg) | Aug 12, 2017 |
| Darrell Simpson; OT | Recruit ratings: Scout: Rivals: 247Sports: ESPN: | | | | |
| Delarrin Turner-Yell; S | Hempstead, Texas | Hempstead High School | 5 ft 10 in (1.78 m) | 170 lb (77 kg) | Aug 26, 2017 |
| Delarrin Turner-Yell; S | Recruit ratings: Scout: Rivals: 247Sports: ESPN: | | | | |
| Brian Asamoah II; LB | Columbus, Ohio | St. Francis DeSales High School | 6 ft 1 in (1.85 m) | 210 lb (95 kg) | Sep 7, 2017 |
| Brian Asamoah II; LB | Recruit ratings: Scout: Rivals: 247Sports: ESPN: | | | | |
| Ronnie Perkins; DE | St. Louis, Missouri | Lutheran High School North | 6 ft 4 in (1.93 m) | 260 lb (120 kg) | Oct 29, 2017 |
| Ronnie Perkins; DE | Recruit ratings: Scout: Rivals: 247Sports: ESPN: | | | | |
| Nik Bonitto; LB | Fort Lauderdale, Florida | St. Thomas Aquinas High School | 6 ft 4 in (1.93 m) | 200 lb (91 kg) | Jan 4, 2018 |
| Nik Bonitto; LB | Recruit ratings: Scout: Rivals: 247Sports: ESPN: | | | | |
| Brendan Radley-Hiles; CB | Calabasas, California | IMG Academy | 5 ft 10 in (1.78 m) | 183 lb (83 kg) | Jan 6, 2018 |
| Brendan Radley-Hiles; CB | Recruit ratings: Scout: Rivals: 247Sports: ESPN: | | | | |
| DaShaun White; LB | North Richland Hills, Texas | Richland High School | 6 ft 1 in (1.85 m) | 222 lb (101 kg) | Jan 6, 2018 |
| DaShaun White; LB | Recruit ratings: Scout: Rivals: 247Sports: ESPN: | | | | |
| Brayden Willis; TE | Arlington, Texas | Martin High School | 6 ft 4 in (1.93 m) | 220 lb (100 kg) | Jan 29, 2018 |
| Brayden Willis; TE | Recruit ratings: Scout: Rivals: 247Sports: ESPN: | | | | |
| Michael Thompson; DT | Creve Coeur, Missouri | Parkway North High School | 6 ft 4 in (1.93 m) | 273 lb (124 kg) | Feb 7, 2018 |
| Michael Thompson; DT | Recruit ratings: Scout: Rivals: 247Sports: ESPN: | | | | |
Overall recruit ranking:
Note: In many cases, Scout, Rivals, 247Sports, On3, and ESPN may conflict in their listings of height and weight.; In these cases, the average was taken. ESPN grades are on a 100-point scale.; Sources: "Oklahoma Football Commitments". Rivals.; "2018 Team Ranking". Rivals.com.

== Preseason ==
=== Award watch lists ===
Listed in the order that they were released

| Award | Player | Position | Year |
|---|---|---|---|
| Lott Trophy | Caleb Kelly | LB | JR |
| Rimington Trophy | Jonathan Alvarez | C | SR |
| Maxwell Award | Rodney Anderson | RB | JR |
| Maxwell Award | Kyler Murray | QB | JR |
| Doak Walker Award | Rodney Anderson | RB | JR |
| Fred Biletnikoff Award | Marquise Brown | WR | JR |
| Fred Biletnikoff Award | CeeDee Lamb | WR | SO |
| John Mackey Award | Grant Calcaterra | TE | SO |
| Butkus Award | Caleb Kelly | LB | JR |
| Outland Trophy | Bobby Evans | OL | JR |
| Outland Trophy | Ben Powers | OL | SR |
| Outland Trophy | Dru Samia | OL | SR |
| Lou Groza Award | Austin Seibert | K/P | SR |
| Ray Guy Award | Austin Seibert | K/P | SR |
| Wuerffel Trophy | Caleb Kelly | LB | JR |
| Walter Camp Award | Rodney Anderson | RB | JR |
| Earl Campbell Tyler Rose Award | Rodney Anderson | RB | JR |
| Earl Campbell Tyler Rose Award | CeeDee Lamb | WR | SO |

=== Big 12 media poll ===
The Big 12 media poll was released on July 12, 2018 with the Sooners predicted to win the Big 12. The Sooners received 46 of 52 first place votes.

== Schedule ==
Oklahoma announced its 2018 football schedule on October 26, 2017. The 2018 schedule consists of 7 home games, 4 away games and 1 neutral-site game in the regular season. The Sooners will host three non-conference games against FAU, UCLA and Army. Oklahoma will host Baylor, Kansas, Kansas State, Oklahoma State and travel to Iowa State, TCU, Texas Tech, West Virginia in regular conference play. Oklahoma will play Texas in Dallas, Texas at the Cotton Bowl Stadium on October 6 in the Red River Showdown, the 113th game played in the series.

| Date | Time | Opponent | Rank | Site | TV | Result | Attendance |
|---|---|---|---|---|---|---|---|
| September 1 | 11:00 a.m. | Florida Atlantic* | No. 7 | Gaylord Family Oklahoma Memorial Stadium; Norman, OK | FOX | W 63–14 | 86,402 |
| September 8 | 12:00 p.m. | UCLA* | No. 6 | Gaylord Family Oklahoma Memorial Stadium; Norman, OK | FOX | W 49–21 | 86,402 |
| September 15 | 11:00 a.m. | at Iowa State | No. 5 | Jack Trice Stadium; Ames, IA | ABC | W 37–27 | 58,479 |
| September 22 | 6:00 p.m. | Army* | No. 5 | Gaylord Family Oklahoma Memorial Stadium; Norman, OK | FSN PPV | W 28–21 ^{OT} | 87,177 |
| September 29 | 2:30 p.m. | Baylor | No. 6 | Gaylord Family Oklahoma Memorial Stadium; Norman, OK | ABC | W 66–33 | 86,642 |
| October 6 | 11:00 a.m. | vs. No. 19 Texas | No. 7 | Cotton Bowl Stadium; Dallas, TX (Red River Showdown) (College GameDay) | FOX | L 45–48 | 92,300 |
| October 20 | 11:00 a.m. | at TCU | No. 9 | Amon G. Carter Stadium; Fort Worth, TX | ABC | W 52–27 | 45,055 |
| October 27 | 2:30 p.m. | Kansas State^{†} | No. 8 | Gaylord Family Oklahoma Memorial Stadium; Norman, OK | FOX | W 51–14 | 86,436 |
| November 3 | 7:00 p.m. | at Texas Tech | No. 7 | Jones AT&T Stadium; Lubbock, TX | ABC | W 51–46 | 60,454 |
| November 10 | 2:30 p.m. | Oklahoma State | No. 6 | Gaylord Family Oklahoma Memorial Stadium; Norman, OK (Bedlam Series) | ABC | W 48–47 | 87,635 |
| November 17 | 6:30 p.m. | Kansas | No. 6 | Gaylord Family Oklahoma Memorial Stadium; Norman, OK | FOX | W 55–40 | 86,371 |
| November 23 | 7:00 p.m. | at No. 13 West Virginia | No. 6 | Mountaineer Field; Morgantown, WV | ESPN | W 59–56 | 60,713 |
| December 1 | 11:00 a.m. | vs. No. 14 Texas | No. 5 | AT&T Stadium; Arlington, TX (Red River Showdown/Big 12 Championship Game) | ABC | W 39–27 | 83,114 |
| December 29 | 7:00 p.m. | vs. No. 1 Alabama* | No. 4 | Hard Rock Stadium; Miami Gardens, FL (Orange Bowl–CFP Semifinal) (College GameDay / SEC Nation) | ESPN | L 34–45 | 66,203 |
*Non-conference game; ^{†}Homecoming; Rankings from AP Poll and CFP Rankings after October 30 released prior to game; All times are in Central time

== Personnel ==
=== Roster ===
2018 Oklahoma Sooners Football
| Quarterback: 1 Kyler Murray – (redshirt) junior (5'10, 195); 3 Connor McGinnis – (redshirt) junior (6'4, 202); 9 Tanner Schafer – (redshirt) sophomore (6'3, 193); 10 Austin Kendall – (redshirt) sophomore (6'1, 210); 14 Reece Clark – (redshirt) junior (6'4, 199); 15 Tanner Mordecai – freshman (6'2, 206); Running backs: 4 Trey Sermon – sophomore (6'0, 224); 21 Marcelias Sutton – senior (5'9, 192); 22 TJ Pledger – freshman (5'9, 200); 24 Rodney Anderson – (redshirt) junior (6'0, 211); 26 Kennedy Brooks – (redshirt) freshman (5'11, 205); 27 Jeremiah Hall – (redshirt) freshman (6'2, 252) (FB+); 29 Joe Castiglione Jr. – (redshirt) junior (5'11, 184) (FB+); 36 Isaiah Harris – freshman (5'9, 199); 39 Michael Anderson – freshman (5'8, 170); 41 Coby Tillman – Freshman (5'11, 233) (FB+); 45 Carson Meier – (redshirt) senior (6'5, 254) (FB+); Wide receiver: 2 CeeDee Lamb – sophomore (6'2, 189); 3 Mykel Jones – junior (5'11, 188); 5 Marquise Brown – junior (5'10, 168); 12 A.D. Miller – (redshirt) junior (6'3, 189); 14 Charleston Rambo – (redshirt) freshman (6'1, 175); 17 Jaquayln Crawford – freshman (5'10, 176); 25 Drake Stoops – freshman (5'9, 169); 28 Reggie Turner – (redshirt) senior (5'8, 155); 37 Spencer Jones – junior (6'1, 193); 38 Devin Staton – freshman (6'2, 195); 82 Andrew Magee – freshman (6'3, 197); 83 Nick Basquine – (redshirt) senior (5'11, 192); 84 Lee Morris – (redshirt) junior (6'2, 207); 85 Sam Iheke – (redshirt) junior (6'4, 201); 86 Karsten Mathis – freshman (6'4, 195); 87 Myles Tease – (redshirt) senior (5'9, 171); 88 Chase Nevel – senior (6'0, 184); 89 Jaylon Robinson – freshman (5'9, 163); Tight ends: 49 Dane Saltarelli – freshman (6'3, 231); 80 Grant Calcaterra – sophomore (6'4, 221); 81 Brayden Willis – freshman (6'3, 221); Long snappers: 51 Kasey Kelleher – (redshirt) freshman (5'10, 224); 53 Jax Wilson – freshman (6'4, 231); 57 Zach Edwards – freshman (5'10, 185) | Offensive lineman: 52 Tyrese Robinson – OL – (redshirt) freshman (6'3, 332); 54 Marquis Hayes – OG – (redshirt) freshman (6'5, 351); 56 Creed Humphrey – C – (redshirt) freshman (6'5, 325); 59 Adrian Ealy – OT – (redshirt) freshman (6'6, 328); 61 Ian McIver – OL – (redshirt) freshman (6'3, 324); 62 David Swaby – OT – sophomore (6'9, 320); 63 Alex Dalton – C – (redshirt) senior (6'3, 290); 66 Logan Roberson – OL – (redshirt) sophomore (6'3, 341); 69 Clayton Woods – C – (redshirt) junior (6'2, 287); 70 Brey Walker – OT – freshman (6'6, 338); 71 Bobby Evans – OL – (redshirt) junior (6'4, 299); 72 Ben Powers – OL – senior (6'4, 320); 73 Quinn Mittermeier – OL – (redshirt) senior (6'5, 265); 74 Cody Ford – OL – (redshirt) junior (6'3, 317); 75 Dru Samia – OT – senior (6'4, 274); 76 Dalton Bishop – C – sophomore (6'5, 289); 77 Erik Swenson – OT – (redshirt) sophomore (6'5, 311); 79 Darrell Simpson – OT – freshman (6'5, 301); Defensive lineman: 7 Ronnie Perkins – DE – freshman (6'3, 234); 31 Jalen Redmond – DE – sophomore (6'2, 253) (LB+); 41 K'Jakyre Daley – DE – (redshirt) freshman (6'2, 254) (LB+); 42 Mark Jackson Jr. – DE – junior (6'3, 265) (LB+); 50 Arthur McGinnis – DT – (redshirt) junior (6'1, 265); 55 Kenneth Mann – DE – (redshirt) junior (6'3, 255); 72 Amani Bledsoe – DE – junior (6'5, 270); 88 Jordan Kelley – DT – freshman (6'3, 297); 90 Neville Gallimore – DL – (redshirt) junior (6'3, 320); 91 Dillion Faamatau – DT – (redshirt) junior (6'3, 219); 92 Michael Thompson – DT – freshman (6'5, 336); 93 Tyreece Lott – DE – sophomore (6'2, 301); 94 Troy James – DT – (redshirt) freshman (6'1, 304); 95 Isaiah Thomas – DE – (redshirt) freshman (6'5, 254); 96 Caden Blanchard – DT – freshman (6'2, 299); 97 Marquise Overton – DT – senior (6'1, 315); 98 Zacchaeus McKinney – DT – (redshirt) freshman (6'3, 306); 99 Ron Tatum – DL – freshman (6'5, 270) | Linebacker: 9 Kenneth Murray – sophomore (6'2, 238); 18 Curtis Bolton – (redshirt) senior (6'0, 232); 19 Caleb Kelly – junior (6'3, 221); 23 DaShaun White – freshman (6'0, 221); 24 Brian Asamoah II – freshman (6'1, 219); 30 Levi Draper – (redshirt) freshman (6'1, 226); 33 Ryan Jones – (redshirt) freshman (6'2, 236); 35 Nik Bonitto – freshman (6'3, 225); 36 Josh Schenck – (redshirt) sophomore (5'11, 209); 38 Bryan Mead – (redshirt) sophomore (6'2, 230); 40 Jon-Michael Terry – (redshirt) sophomore (6'3, 241); 48 Deuce Nisbet – freshman (6'1, 214); 49 Travis DeGrate – (redshirt) freshman (6'2, 232); Defensive backs: 1 Jordan Parker – S – (redshirt) sophomore (6'1, 190); 6 Tre Brown – CB – sophomore (5'10, 182); 8 Kahlil Haughton – S – senior (6'1, 197); 10 Patrick Fields – S – freshman (5'11, 193); 11 Parnell Motley – CB – junior (6'0, 177); 12 Starrland Baldwin – CB – freshman (5'11, 161); 13 Tre Norwood – CB – sophomore (6'0, 179); 16 Miguel Edwards – CB – freshman (5'11, 173); 20 Robert Barnes – S – sophomore (6'2, 207); 25 Justin Broiles – DB – (redshirt) freshman (5'10, 181); 26 Caleb Murphy – DB – freshman (5'11, 207); 28 Chanse Sylvie – S – junior (5'11, 187); 29 Prentice McKinney – S – senior (6'1, 187); 32 Delarrin Turner-Yell – S – freshman (5'10, 175); 34 Tanner Baum – CB – (redshirt) sophomore (5'11, 196); 35 Robert Charlton II – DB – (redshirt) junior (5'10, 181); 44 Brendan Radley-Hiles – DB – freshman (5'9, 186); Placekickers: 30 Calum Sutherland – (redshirt) freshman (5'9, 191); 43 Austin Seibert – senior (5'10, 214) (+P); 47 Gabe Brkic – freshman (6'2, 189) (+P); 48 Stephen Johnson – freshman (6'1, 185); Punter: 46 Reeves Mundschau – (redshirt) freshman (5'11, 179) |

=== Coaching staff ===
| Name | Position | Alma mater | Joined staff |
|---|---|---|---|
| Lincoln Riley | Head Coach / Quarterbacks | Texas Tech (2006) | 2015/2017 |
| Ruffin McNeill | Assistant Head Coach / Interim Defensive Coordinator | East Carolina (1980) | 2017 |
| Shane Beamer | Assistant Head Coach / Tight Ends and H-Backs | Virginia Tech (1999) | 2018 |
| Cale Gundy | Co-Offensive Coordinator/ Inside Receivers / Recruiting Coordinator | Oklahoma (1994) | 1999 |
| Bill Bedenbaugh | Co-Offensive Coordinator / Offensive Line | Iowa Wesleyan (1995) | 2013 |
| Kerry Cooks | Assistant Defensive Coordinator / Defensive Backs | Iowa (1997) | 2015 |
| Jay Boulware | Special Teams Coordinator / Running Backs | Texas (1996) | 2013 |
| Tim Kish | Inside Linebackers | Otterbein (1976) | 2012 |
| Bob Diaco | Outside Linebackers | Iowa (1995) | 2018 |
| Dennis Simmons | Outside Receivers | BYU (1997) | 2015 |
| Calvin Thibodeaux | Defensive Line | Oklahoma (2006) | 2016 |
| Bennie Wylie | Director of Sports Performance | Sam Houston State (1999) | 2018 |
| Clarke Stroud | Director of Football Operations | Oklahoma (1990) | 2018 |
| Jamarkus McFarland | Graduate assistant | Oklahoma (2013) | 2016 |

=== Depth chart ===
Defense

FS
Robert Barnes
Delarrin Turner-Yell
Chanse Sylvie

| JACK | MIKE | WILL | SAM |
|---|---|---|---|
| Ronnie Perkins | Kenneth Murray | Curtis Bolton | Ryan Jones |
| Mark Jackson, Jr. | DaShaun White | Caleb Kelly | Nik Bonitto |
| Jon-Michael Terry | ⋅ | Levi Draper | ⋅ |

SS
Delarrin Turner-Yell
Patrick Fields
Jordan Parker

CB
Tre Brown
Parnell Motley
⋅

| DE | NT | DE |
|---|---|---|
| Kenneth Mann | Neville Gallimore | Amani Bledsoe |
| Isaiah Thomas | Dillon Faamatau | Tyreece Lott |
| ⋅ | Marquise Overton | ⋅ |

CB
Tre Norwood
Justin Broiles
⋅

Offense

WR
Marquise Brown
Charleston Rambo
Mykel Jones

WR
Myles Tease
Nick Basquine
Drake Stoops

| LT | LG | C | RG | RT |
|---|---|---|---|---|
| Bobby Evans | Ben Powers | Creed Humphrey | Dru Samia | Cody Ford |
| Erik Swenson | Marquis Hayes | Dru Samia | Tyrese Robinson | Adrian Ealy |
| ⋅ | ⋅ | ⋅ | ⋅ | ⋅ |

TE
Grant Calcaterra
Lee Morris
⋅

WR
CeeDee Lamb
A.D. Miller
⋅

QB
Kyler Murray
Austin Kendall
Tanner Mordecai

Special teams
PK Austin Seibert
Gabe Brkic
P Austin Seibert
Reeves Mundschau
KR Tre Brown
PR CeeDee Lamb
Marquise Brown
LS Kasey Kelleher
Zach Edwards
H Connor McGinnis

RB
Trey Sermon
Kennedy Brooks
TJ Pledger

== Game summaries ==
=== Florida Atlantic ===
Florida Atlantic Owls vs No. 7 Oklahoma Sooners – Game summary

| Quarter | 1 | 2 | 3 | 4 | Total |
|---|---|---|---|---|---|
| Florida Atlantic | 0 | 0 | 7 | 7 | 14 |
| No. 7 Oklahoma | 28 | 14 | 14 | 7 | 63 |

at Gaylord Family Oklahoma Memorial Stadium • Norman, Oklahoma

- Date: September 1, 2018
- Game time: 11:05 a.m. CDT
- Game weather: Temperature: 86 • Wind: S 7(MPH) • Weather:Hot and Sunny
- Game attendance: 86,402
- Referee: Cooper Castleberry
- TV announcers (FOX): Gus Johnson (Play-by-Play), Joel Klatt (analyst), Jenny Taft (sideline)

Game information

First Quarter

- (7:40) OKLA – Rodney Anderson 30 yard TD rush, Austin Seibert kick
  Oklahoma 7–0; 7 plays, 74 yards, 3:08
- (6:42) OKLA – Curtis Bolton recovered blocked punt in end zone for TD, Seibert kick
  Oklahoma 14–0
- (4:49) OKLA – Lee Morris 65 yard TD pass from Kyler Murray, Seibert kick
  Oklahoma 21–0; 1 play, 65 yards, 0:16
- (0:04) OKLA – Trey Sermon 17 yard TD rush, Seibert kick
  Oklahoma 28–0; 6 plays, 63 yards, 2:14

Second Quarter

- (13:07) OKLA – Anderson 65 yard TD rush, Seibert kick
  Oklahoma 35–0; 3 plays, 74 yards, 1:22
- (4:17) OKLA – Marquise Brown 65 yard pass from Murray, Seibert kick
  Oklahoma 42–0; 6 plays, 90 yards, 1:32

Third Quarter

- (12:16) OKLA – Marcelias Sutton 22 Yd Run, Seibert kick
  Oklahoma 49–0; 6 plays, 69 yards, 2:44
- (4:56) OKLA – A.D. Miller 6 Yd pass from Austin Kendall, Seibert kick
  Oklahoma 56–0; 9 plays, 57 yards, 4:26
- (0:55) FAU – Devin Singletary 5 Yd Run, Vladimir Rivas kick
  Oklahoma 56–7; 10 plays, 75 yards, 4:01

Fourth Quarter

- (11:42) OKLA – Kennedy Brooks 41 Yd Run, Gabe Brkic kick
  Oklahoma 63–7; 3 plays, 74 yards, 1:22
- (4:13) FAU – Kerrith Whyte 7 Yd Run, Rivas kick
  Oklahoma 63–14; 15 plays, 75 yards, 7:29

=== UCLA ===
UCLA Bruins vs No. 6 Oklahoma Sooners – Game summary

| Quarter | 1 | 2 | 3 | 4 | Total |
|---|---|---|---|---|---|
| UCLA | 7 | 0 | 0 | 14 | 21 |
| No. 6 Oklahoma | 14 | 7 | 14 | 14 | 49 |

at Gaylord Family Oklahoma Memorial Stadium • Norman, Oklahoma

- Date: September 8, 2018
- Game time: 12:05 p.m. CDT
- Game weather: Temperature: 70 • Wind:N10 (MPH) • Weather:Overcast
- Game attendance: 86,402
- Referee: Mike Mothershed
- TV announcers (FOX): Gus Johnson (Play-by-Play), Joel Klatt (analyst), Jenny Taft (sideline)

Game information

First Quarter

- (8:59) UCLA – Bolu Olorunfunmi 3 Yd Run, J. J. Molson Kick
  UCLA 7–0; 7 plays, 74 yards, 3:08
- (7:20) OKLA – Rodney Anderson 3 Yd Run, Austin Seibert Kick
  Oklahoma 7–7;
- (3:17) OKLA – Marquise Brown 58 Yd pass from Kyler Murray, Seibert kick
  Oklahoma 14–7; 1 play, 65 yards, 0:16

Second Quarter

- (14:55) OKLA – Murray 10 Yd Run, Seibert kick
  Oklahoma 21–7; 3 plays, 74 yards, 1:22

Third Quarter

- (7:34) OKLA – Marcelias Sutton 11 Yd Run, Seibert kick
  Oklahoma 28–7; 9 plays, 57 yards, 4:26
- (5:19) OKLA – A.D. Miller 10 Yd pass from Kyler Murray, Seibert kick
  Oklahoma 35–7; 10 plays, 75 yards, 4:01

Fourth Quarter

- (13:27) OKLA – CeeDee Lamb 35 Yd pass from Kyler Murray, Seibert kick
  Oklahoma 42–7; 3 plays, 74 yards, 1:22
- (11:11) UCLA – Olorunfunmi 2 Yd Run, Molson kick
  Oklahoma 42–14; 3 plays, 74 yards, 1:22
- (7:40) OKLA – Murray 2 Yd Run, Seibert kick
  Oklahoma 49–14; 3 plays, 74 yards, 1:22
- (3:44) UCLA – Michael Ezeike 9 Yd pass from Dorian Thompson-Robinson, Molson kick
  Oklahoma 49–21; 15 plays, 75 yards, 7:29

=== At Iowa State ===
No. 5 Oklahoma Sooners at Iowa State Cyclones – Game summary

| Quarter | 1 | 2 | 3 | 4 | Total |
|---|---|---|---|---|---|
| No. 5 Oklahoma | 10 | 14 | 10 | 3 | 37 |
| Iowa State | 0 | 10 | 14 | 3 | 27 |

at Jack Trice Stadium • Ames, Iowa

- Date: September 15, 2018
- Game time: 11:06 a.m. CDT
- Game weather: Temperature:83 • Wind:ESE 2 (MPH) • Weather: Partly Cloudy
- Game attendance: 58,479
- Referee: Brad Van Vark
- TV announcers (ABC): Dave Pasch (Play-by-Play), Greg McElroy (analyst), Tom Luginbill (sideline)

Game information

First Quarter

- (8:22) OKLA – Austin Seibert 21 Yd Field Goal
  Oklahoma 3–0;
- (3:43) OKLA – Marquise Brown 75 Yd pass from Kyler Murray, Austin Seibert kick
  Oklahoma 10–0; 1 play, 65 yards, 0:16

Second Quarter

- (13:38) ISU – Connor Assalley 34 Yd Field Goal
  Oklahoma 10–3; 3 plays, 74 yards, 1:22
- (13:15) ISU – Hakeem Butler 51 Yd pass from Zeb Noland, Connor Assalley Kick
  Tied 10–10; 3 plays, 74 yards, 1:22
- (11:11) OKLA – CeeDee Lamb 5 Yd pass from Murray, Seibert kick
  Oklahoma 17–10; 3 plays, 74 yards, 1:22
- (0:05) OKLA – Myles Tease 7 Yd pass from Murray, Seibert kick
  Oklahoma 24–10; 3 plays, 74 yards, 1:22

Third Quarter

- (11:48) ISU – Butler 57 Yd pass from Noland, Assalley kick
  Oklahoma 24–17; 3 plays, 74 yards, 1:22
- (9:20) OKLA – Trey Sermon 22 Yd Run, Seibert kick
  Oklahoma 31–17; 3 plays, 74 yards, 1:22
- (6:40) ISU – David Montgomery 1 Yd Run, Assalley kick
  Oklahoma 31–24; 3 plays, 74 yards, 1:22
- (3:20) OKLA – Austin Seibert 31 Yd Field Goal
  Oklahoma 34–24; 3 plays, 74 yards, 1:22

Fourth Quarter

- (10:43) ISU – Connor Assalley 21 Yd Field Goal
  Oklahoma 34–27; 3 plays, 74 yards, 1:22
- (2:51) OKLA – Austin Seibert 42 Yd Field Goal
  Oklahoma 37–27; 15 plays, 75 yards, 7:29

=== Army ===
Army Black Knights vs No. 5 Oklahoma Sooners – Game summary

| Quarter | 1 | 2 | 3 | 4 | OT | Total |
|---|---|---|---|---|---|---|
| Army | 7 | 7 | 7 | 0 | 0 | 21 |
| No. 5 Oklahoma | 14 | 7 | 0 | 0 | 7 | 28 |

at Gaylord Family Oklahoma Memorial Stadium • Norman, Oklahoma

- Date: September 22, 2018
- Game time: 6:05 p.m. CDT
- Game weather: Temperature:71 • Wind:NE 10 (MPH) • Weather: Overcast
- Game attendance: 87,177
- Referee: Jerry Magallanes
- TV announcers (FOX PPV): Brendan Burke (Play-by-Play), Gary Reasons (analyst), Christian Steckel (sideline)
- ESPN - No. 5 Oklahoma escapes with 28-21 OT win over Army /// Box Score, Army at #5 Oklahoma

Game information

First Quarter

- (12:20) OU TD: Carson Meier 11-yard pass from Kyler Murray (Austin Seibert kick); 6 plays, 68 yards, 2:40
- (02:49) ARMY TD: Connor Slomka 1-yard rush (John Abercrombie kick); 16 plays, 75 yards, 9:31
- (00:13) OU TD: CeeDee Lamb 11-yard pass from Kyler Murray (Austin Seibert kick); 6 plays, 65 yards, 2:36

Second Quarter

- (06:19) ARMY TD: Kelvin Hopkins Jr. 5-yard rush (John Abercrombie kick); 16 plays, 75 yards, 8:54
- (04:25) OU TD: Kyler Murray 33-yard rush (Austin Seibert kick); 4 plays, 66 yards, 1:54

Third Quarter

- (01:51) ARMY TD: Andy Davidson 3-yard rush (John Abercrombie kick); 19 plays, 85 yards, 10:47

Fourth Quarter

No Scoring

Overtime

- OU TD: CeeDee Lamb 10-yard pass from Kyler Murray (Austin Seibert kick); 2 plays, 30 yards

Passing

- ARMY – Kelvin Hopkins Jr.: 3/8, 40 yds, 2 INT
- OU – Kyler Murray: 11/15, 165 yds, 3 TD, 1 INT

Rushing

- ARMY – Kelvin Hopkins Jr.: 25 att, 102 yds, 1 TD
- OU – Trey Sermon: 18 att, 119 yds

Receiving

- ARMY – Kell Walker: 3 rec, 40 yds
- OU – Grant Calcaterra: 2 rec, 47 yds

=== Baylor ===
Baylor Bears vs No. 6 Oklahoma Sooners – Game summary

| Quarter | 1 | 2 | 3 | 4 | Total |
|---|---|---|---|---|---|
| Baylor | 6 | 3 | 14 | 10 | 33 |
| No. 6 Oklahoma | 14 | 14 | 21 | 17 | 66 |

at Gaylord Family Oklahoma Memorial Stadium • Norman, Oklahoma

- Date: September 29, 2018
- Game time: 2:36 p.m. CDT
- Game weather: Temperature:71 • Wind:SSW 10 (MPH) • Weather: Overcast
- Game attendance: 86,642
- Referee: Scott Campbell
- TV announcers (ABC): Mark Jones (Play-by-Play), Dusty Dvoracek (analyst), Molly McGrath (sideline)

=== vs Texas ===
No. 19 Texas Longhorns vs No. 7 Oklahoma Sooners – Game summary

| Quarter | 1 | 2 | 3 | 4 | Total |
|---|---|---|---|---|---|
| No. 19 Texas | 10 | 14 | 21 | 3 | 48 |
| No. 7 Oklahoma | 7 | 10 | 7 | 21 | 45 |

at Cotton Bowl Stadium • Dallas, Texas

- Date: October 6, 2018
- Game time: 11:05 a.m. CDT
- Game weather: Temperature: 80 • Wind:SSE 10(MPH) • Weather: Overcast and Humid
- Game attendance: 92,300
- Referee: Brandon Cruse
- TV announcers (FOX): Gus Johnson (Play-by-Play), Joel Klatt (analyst), Jenny Taft (sideline)

=== At TCU ===
Oklahoma Sooners at TCU Horned Frogs – Game summary

| Quarter | 1 | 2 | 3 | 4 | Total |
|---|---|---|---|---|---|
| No. 9 Oklahoma | 14 | 14 | 10 | 14 | 52 |
| TCU | 7 | 17 | 3 | 0 | 27 |

at Amon G. Carter Stadium • Fort Worth, Texas

- Date: October 20, 2018
- Game time: 11:00 a.m. CDT
- Game weather: Temperature: 61 • Wind: N 11 (MPH) • Weather: Cloudy
- Game attendance: 45,055
- Referee: Mike Defee
- TV announcers (ABC): Bob Wischusen (Play-by-Play), Brock Huard (analyst), Allison Williams (sideline)

=== Kansas State ===
Kansas State Wildcats vs No. 8 Oklahoma Sooners – Game summary

| Quarter | 1 | 2 | 3 | 4 | Total |
|---|---|---|---|---|---|
| Kansas State | 0 | 7 | 0 | 7 | 14 |
| No. 8 Oklahoma | 17 | 17 | 14 | 3 | 51 |

at Gaylord Family Oklahoma Memorial Stadium • Norman, Oklahoma

- Date: October 27, 2018
- Game time: 2:35 p.m. CDT
- Game weather: Temperature: • Wind: (MPH) • Weather:
- Game attendance: 86,436
- Referee: Cooper Castleberry
- TV announcers (Fox): Gus Johnson (Play-by-Play), Joel Klatt (analyst), Jenny Taft (sideline)

Kansas State has a week off between the previous win against Oklahoma State and their next game against Oklahoma. Oklahoma's new defensive coordinator Ruffin McNeill was able to simplify the defensive plan which helped turn out good results against Texas Christian in the previous week with a Sooner victory 52-27. K-State's Coach Snyder commented: "They're very much the same football team that they were on the defensive side of the ball, on both sides actually, but certainly on the defensive side. I saw some tweaks, a few things, that you might consider to be changes -- don't know if they're changes or are just there and hadn't surfaced previously. But by and large, it's the same defense."

When the game rolled around, both the offense and the defense for Oklahoma performed to control the game from start to finish, with a final score of 51-14 and an Oklahoma win.

=== At Texas Tech ===
No. 7 Oklahoma Sooners at Texas Tech Red Raiders – Game summary

| Quarter | 1 | 2 | 3 | 4 | Total |
|---|---|---|---|---|---|
| No. 7 Oklahoma | 7 | 21 | 7 | 16 | 51 |
| Texas Tech | 14 | 17 | 0 | 15 | 46 |

at Jones AT&T Stadium • Lubbock, Texas

- Date: November 3, 2018
- Game time: 7:14 p.m. CDT
- Game weather: Temperature: • Wind: (MPH) • Weather:
- Game attendance: 60,454
- Referee: Reggie Smith
- TV announcers (ABC): Steve Levy (Play-by-Play), Brian Griese (analyst), Todd McShay (sideline)

Game information

First quarter

- TTU – T. J. Vasher 6-yard pass from Alan Bowman (Clayton Hatfield kick), 10:30. Red Raiders 7–0. Drive: 2 plays, 3 yards, 0:38.
- TTU – Ta'Zhawn Henry 14-yard pass from Jett Duffey (Clayton Hatfield kick), 6:59. Red Raiders 14–0. Drive: 4 plays, 25 yards, 1:44.
- OKLA – Lee Morris 16-yard pass from Kyler Murray (Austin Seibert kick), 4:11. Red Raiders 14–7. Drive: 6 plays, 75 yards, 2:48.

Second quarter

- TTU – Clayton Hatfield 43-yard field goal, 14:03. Red Raiders 17–7. Drive: 10 plays, 50 yards, 5:08.
- OKLA – Kyler Murray 12-yard run (Austin Seibert kick), 12:17. Red Raiders 17–14. Drive: 6 plays, 75 yards, 1:46.
- TTU – Da'Leon Ward 45-yard pass from Alan Bowman (Clayton Hatfield kick), 11:35. Red Raiders 24–14. Drive: 3 plays, 75 yards, 0:42.
- OKLA – Trey Sermon 5-yard run (Austin Seibert kick), 8:53. Red Raiders 24–21. Drive: 8 plays, 83 yards, 2:42.
- OKLA – Carson Meier 5-yard pass from Kyler Murray (Austin Seibert kick), 4:22. Sooners 28–24. Drive: 7 plays, 99 yards, 3:31.
- TTU – Da'Leon Ward 1-yard run (Clayton Hatfield kick), 0:56. Red Raiders 31–28. Drive: 9 plays, 75 yards, 3:26.

Third quarter

- OKLA – Lee Morris 46-yard pass from Kyler Murray (Austin Seibert kick), 12:05. Sooners 35–31. Drive: 4 plays, 69 yards, 1:21.

Fourth quarter

- TTU – Clayton Hatfield 26-yard field goal, 14:43. Sooners 35–34. Drive: 5 plays, 54 yards, 1:34.
- OKLA – Trey Sermon 20-yard run (Austin Seibert kick), 11:54. Sooners 42–34. Drive: 8 plays, 75 yards, 2:49.
- TTU – Zach Austin 4-yard pass from Jett Duffey (pass failed), 6:54. Sooners 42–40. Drive: 12 plays, 75 yards, 5:00.
- OKLA – Robert Barnes defensive PAT conversion, 6:54. Sooners 44–40.
- OKLA – Trey Sermon 30-yard run (Austin Seibert kick), 2:51. Sooners 51–40. Drive: 7 plays, 75 yards, 4:03.
- TTU – Jett Duffey 1-yard run (pass failed), 1:05. Sooners 51–46. Drive: 8 plays, 54 yards, 1:46.

Top passers

- OKLA – Kyler Murray – 20/35, 360 yards, 3 TD, 2 INT
- TTU – Alan Bowman – 21/26, 227 yards, 2 TD

Top rushers

- OKLA – Trey Sermon – 26 carries, 206 yards, 3 TD
- TTU – Da'Leon Ward – 8 carries, 53 yards, TD

Top receivers

- OKLA – Lee Morris – 4 receptions, 101 yards, 2 TD
- TTU – Antoine Wesley – 12 receptions, 199 yards

=== Oklahoma State ===
Bedlam Series: Oklahoma State Cowboys at No. 6 Oklahoma Sooners

| Quarter | 1 | 2 | 3 | 4 | Total |
|---|---|---|---|---|---|
| Oklahoma St | 14 | 14 | 7 | 12 | 47 |
| Oklahoma | 14 | 20 | 7 | 7 | 48 |

at Gaylord Family Oklahoma Memorial Stadium, Norman, Oklahoma

- Date: November 10, 2018
- Game time: 2:30 p.m. CST
- Game weather: Sunny, 48 °F (9 °C)
- Game attendance: 87,635
- Referee: Brad Van Vark
- TV announcers (ABC): Steve Levy, Brian Griese, and Todd McShay
- Box Score

Game information

First quarter

- OU – Trey Sermon 1-yard run (Austin Seibert kick), 13:16. Oklahoma 7–0. Drive: 4 plays, 75 yards, 1:44.
- OSU – Justice Hill 1-yard run (Matt Ammendola kick), 11:59. Tie 7–7. Drive: 4 plays, 75 yards, 1:17.
- OU – Kennedy Brooks 1-yard run (Austin Seibert kick), 9:06. Oklahoma 14–7. Drive: 7 plays, 75 yards, 2:53.
- OSU – Tyron Johnson 31-yard pass from Taylor Cornelius (Matt Ammendola kick), 5:30. Tie 14–14. Drive: 10 plays, 75 yards, 3:36.

Second quarter

- OU – Austin Seibert 21-yard field goal, 13:37. Oklahoma 17–14. Drive: 13 plays, 79 yards, 6:53.
- OSU – Tylan Wallace 49-yard pass from Taylor Cornelius (Matt Ammendola kick), 13:04. Oklahoma St 21–17. Drive: 4 plays, 75 yards, 0:33.
- OU – Kennedy Brooks 45-yard run (Austin Seibert kick), 11:38. Oklahoma 24–21. Drive: 3 plays, 73 yards, 1:26.
- OU – Austin Seibert 36-yard field goal, 7:22. Oklahoma 27–21. Drive: 7 plays, 10 yards, 2:31.
- OU – Marquise Brown 51-yard pass from Kyler Murray (Austin Seibert kick), 1:25. Oklahoma 34–21. Drive: 4 plays, 85 yards, 1:09.
- OSU – Chuba Hubbard 10-yard run (Matt Ammendola kick), 0:31. Oklahoma 34–28. Drive: 5 plays, 75 yards, 0:54.

Third quarter

- OSU – Chuba Hubbard 2-yard run (Matt Ammendola kick), 7:32. Oklahoma St 35–34. Drive: 9 plays, 60 yards, 2:58.
- OU – Kennedy Brooks 5-yard run (Austin Seibert kick), 0:00. Oklahoma 41–35. Drive: 8 plays, 93 yards, 3:31.

Fourth quarter

- OSU – Chuba Hubbard 3-yard run (kick failed), 12:20. Tie 41–41. Drive: 10 plays, 75 yards, 2:40.
- OU – Trey Sermon 1-yard run (Austin Seibert kick), 3:29. Oklahoma 48–41. Drive: 6 plays, 64 yards, 2:40.
- OSU – Tylan Wallace 24-yard pass from Taylor Cornelius (pass failed), 1:03. Oklahoma 48–47. Drive: 9 plays, 71 yards, 2:26.

Top passers

- OSU – Taylor Cornelius – 34/53, 501 yards, 3 TD
- OU – Kyler Murray – 21/29, 349 yards, TD

Top rushers

- OSU – Chuba Hubbard – 22 rushes, 104 yards, 3 TD
- OU – Kennedy Brooks – 15 rushes, 165 yards, 3 TD

Top receivers

- OSU – Tylan Wallace – 10 receptions, 220 yards, 2 TD
- OU – Marquise Brown – 8 receptions, 142 yards, TD

- Trey Sermon 124 rushing yards

=== Kansas ===
Kansas Jayhawks vs No. 6 Oklahoma Sooners

| Quarter | 1 | 2 | 3 | 4 | Total |
|---|---|---|---|---|---|
| Kansas | 7 | 3 | 7 | 23 | 40 |
| #6 Oklahoma | 7 | 14 | 14 | 20 | 55 |

at Gaylord Family Oklahoma Memorial Stadium • Norman, Oklahoma

- Date: November 17, 2018
- Game time: 6:35 p.m. CST
- Game weather: Temperature: 43 • Wind: N15 (MPH) • Weather:Arctic front arrival
- Game attendance: 86,371
- Referee: Eddy Shelton
- TV announcers (FOX): Tim Brando (Play-by-Play), Spencer Tillman (analyst), Holly Sonders (sideline)

=== At West Virginia ===
No. 6 Oklahoma Sooners at No. 13 West Virginia Mountaineers – Game summary

| Quarter | 1 | 2 | 3 | 4 | Total |
|---|---|---|---|---|---|
| #6 Oklahoma | 14 | 21 | 10 | 14 | 59 |
| #13 West Virginia | 14 | 14 | 21 | 7 | 56 |

at Mountaineer Field • Morgantown, West Virginia

- Date: November 23, 2018
- Game time: 7:00 p.m. CST
- Game weather: Temperature: • Wind: (MPH) • Weather:
- Referee: Mike Defee
- TV announcers (ESPN): Sean McDonough (Play-by-Play), Todd Blackledge (analyst), Holly Rowe (sideline)

=== vs Texas ===
| | 1 | 2 | 3 | 4 | Total |
|---|---|---|---|---|---|
| No. 14 Longhorns | 7 | 7 | 13 | 0 | 27 |
| No. 5 Sooners | 3 | 17 | 7 | 12 | 39 |

| Statistics | TEX | OU |
|---|---|---|
| First downs | 23 | 29 |
| Plays–yards | 437 | 508 |
| Rushes–yards | 32–88 | 40–129 |
| Passing yards | 349 | 379 |
| Passing: Comp–Att–Int | 23–37–1 | 25–34–0 |
| Time of possession | 28:00 | 32:00 |

| Team | Category | Player | Statistics |
|---|---|---|---|
| Texas | Passing | Sam Ehlinger | 25/36, 349 yards, 2 TD, INT |
| Texas | Rushing | Sam Ehlinger | 14 carries, 42 yards, TD |
| Texas | Receiving | Collin Johnson | 8 receptions, 177 yards, TD |
| Oklahoma | Passing | Kyler Murray | 25/34, 379 yards, 3 TD |
| Oklahoma | Rushing | Trey Sermon | 18 carries, 65 yards, TD |
| Oklahoma | Receiving | CeeDee Lamb | 6 receptions, 167 yards, TD |

=== vs. #1 Alabama (CFP Semifinal) ===
Capital One Orange Bowl (Semifinal)

| Team | 1 | 2 | 3 | 4 | Total |
|---|---|---|---|---|---|
| #4 Oklahoma | 0 | 10 | 10 | 14 | 34 |
| • #1 Alabama | 21 | 10 | 0 | 14 | 45 |

- Date: December 29
- Location: Miami Gardens, FL
- Game start: 7:10 p.m. CST
- Game attendance: 66,203
- Game weather: Temperature: 75 • Wind: SE 3mph • Weather: Cloudy
- Referee: Duane Heydt
- TV announcers (ESPN): Chris Fowler (play-by-play), Kirk Herbstreit (color), Maria Taylor and Laura Rutledge (sideline)

Scoring summary
| Q1 |
| Q2 |
| Q3 |
| Q4 |

=== Statistics ===
| Statistics | OKLA | BAMA |
|---|---|---|
| First downs | 26 | 28 |
| Plays–yards | 69–471 | 70–528 |
| Rushes–yards | 32–163 | 42–200 |
| Passing yards | 308 | 328 |
| Passing: comp–att–int | 19–37–0 | 25–28–0 |
| Turnovers | | |
| Time of possession | 23:52 | 36:08 |

| Team | Category | Player | Statistics |
|---|---|---|---|
| Oklahoma | Passing | Kyler Murray | 19/37, 308 yds, 2 TD |
| Oklahoma | Rushing | Kyler Murray | 17 car, 109 yds, 1 TD |
| Oklahoma | Receiving | CeeDee Lamb | 8 rec, 109 yds, 1 TD |
| Alabama | Passing | Tua Tagovailoa | 24/27, 318 yds, 4 TD |
| Alabama | Rushing | Josh Jacobs | 15 car, 98 yds |
| Alabama | Receiving | DeVonta Smith | 6 rec, 104 yds, 1 TD |

== Statistics ==
=== Scoring ===
Scores against non-conference opponents

| | 1 | 2 | 3 | 4 | OT | Total |
|---|---|---|---|---|---|---|
| Opponents | 14 | 7 | 14 | 21 | 0 | 56 |
| Oklahoma | 56 | 31 | 31 | 21 | 7 | 146 |

Scores against the Big 12

| | 1 | 2 | 3 | 4 | Total |
|---|---|---|---|---|---|
| Opponents | 72 | 99 | 87 | 80 | 338 |
| Oklahoma | 104 | 145 | 100 | 115 | 464 |

Scores against all opponents

| | 1 | 2 | 3 | 4 | OT | Total |
|---|---|---|---|---|---|---|
| Opponents | 86 | 106 | 101 | 101 | 0 | 394 |
| Oklahoma | 160 | 176 | 131 | 136 | 7 | 610 |

== 2019 NFL draft ==
Oklahoma had eight players selected in the 2019 NFL draft.

| Round | Pick | Player | Position | NFL team |
|---|---|---|---|---|
| 1 | 1 | Kyler Murray | Quarterback | Arizona Cardinals |
| 1 | 25 | Marquise Brown | Wide receiver | Baltimore Ravens |
| 2 | 38 | Cody Ford | Offensive tackle | Buffalo Bills |
| 3 | 97 | Bobby Evans | Offensive line | Los Angeles Rams |
| 4 | 114 | Dru Samia | Guard | Minnesota Vikings |
| 4 | 123 | Ben Powers | Guard | Baltimore Ravens |
| 5 | 170 | Austin Seibert | Kicker | Cleveland Browns |
| 6 | 211 | Rodney Anderson | Running back | Cincinnati Bengals |

== Rankings ==
Ranking movements Legend: ██ Increase in ranking ██ Decrease in ranking
| | Week | | | | | | | | | | | | | | | |
| Poll | Pre | 1 | 2 | 3 | 4 | 5 | 6 | 7 | 8 | 9 | 10 | 11 | 12 | 13 | 14 | Final |
|---|---|---|---|---|---|---|---|---|---|---|---|---|---|---|---|---|
| AP | 7 | 6 | 5 | 5 | 6 | 7 | 11 | 9 | 8 | 7 | 6 | 6 | 6 | 5 | 4 | 4 |
| Coaches | 5 | 5 | 5 | 5 | 5 | 5 | 11 | 10 | 8 | 7 | 6 | 6 | 6 | 5 | 4 | 4 |
| CFP | Not released | | | | | | | | | 7 | 6 | 6 | 6 | 5 | 4 | Not released |
