= Grant Calcaterra =

American football player (born 1998)

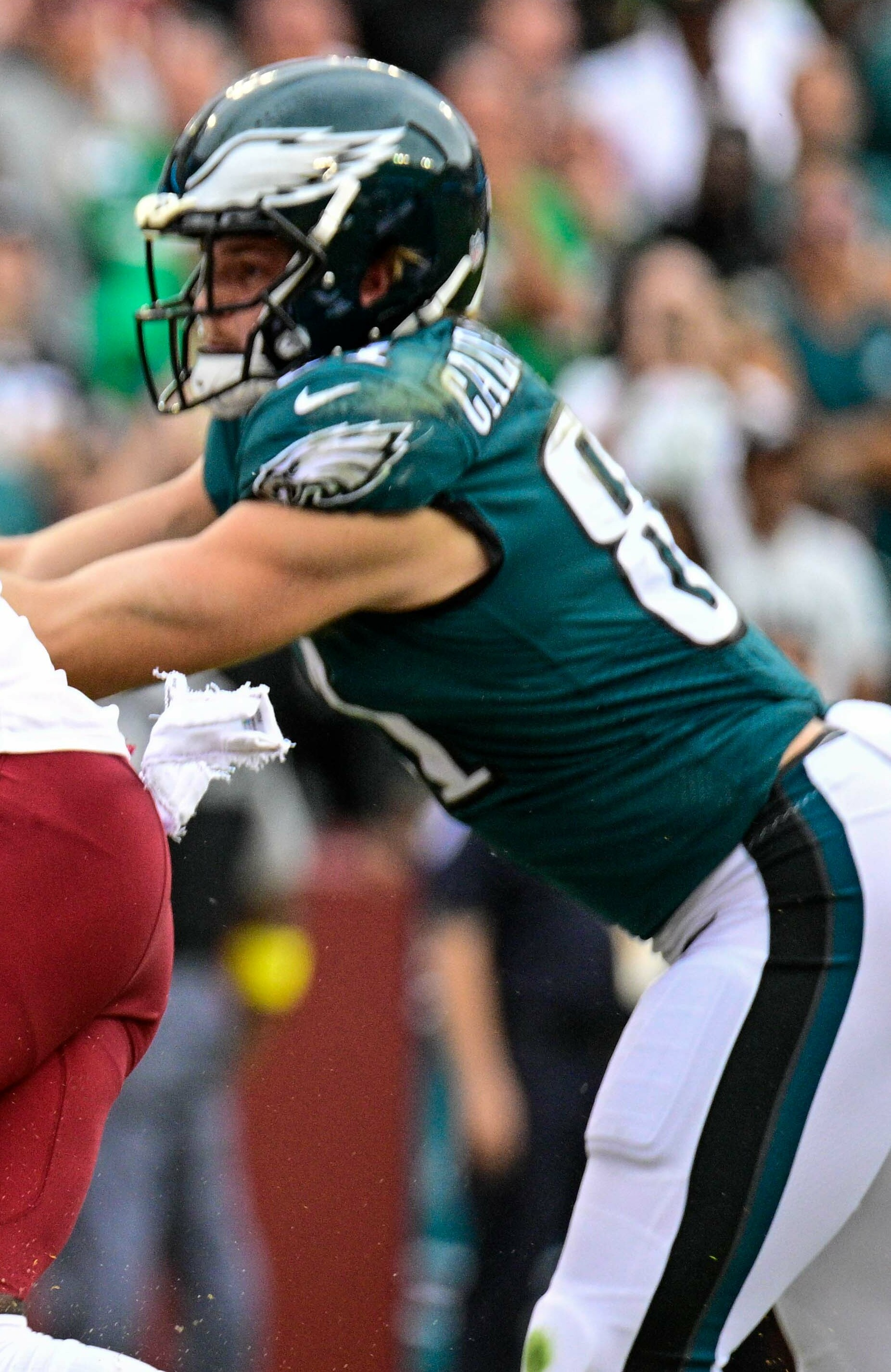
- Calcaterra with the Philadelphia Eagles in 2022

No. 81 – Philadelphia Eagles
- Position: Tight end
- Roster status: Active

Personal information
- Born: December 4, 1998 (age 27); Cincinnati, Ohio, U.S.
- Listed height: 6 ft 4 in (1.93 m)
- Listed weight: 240 lb (109 kg)

Career information
- High school: Santa Margarita Catholic (Rancho Santa Margarita, California)
- College: Oklahoma (2017–2019); SMU (2021)
- NFL draft: 2022: 6th round, 198th overall pick

Career history
- Philadelphia Eagles (2022–present)

Awards and highlights
- Super Bowl champion (LIX); First-team All-Big 12 (2018); Second-team All-AAC (2021)

Career NFL statistics as of 2025
- Receptions: 42
- Receiving yards: 494
- Receiving touchdowns: 2
- Stats at Pro Football Reference

Grant Calcaterra (born December 4, 1998) is an American professional football tight end for the Philadelphia Eagles of the National Football League (NFL). He played college football for the Oklahoma Sooners before transferring to the SMU Mustangs.

== Early life ==
Calcaterra attended Santa Margarita Catholic High School in Rancho Santa Margarita, California. As a junior, he caught 48 passes for 926 yards and nine touchdowns. He committed to play college football at the University of Oklahoma after his junior season. As a senior, he caught 57 passes for 958 yards and eight touchdowns. He was named to the 2017 Under Armour All-America Game.

== College career ==
As a freshman at Oklahoma in 2017, Calcaterra played in 14 games and caught ten passes for 162 yards and three touchdowns. In 2018, his sophomore year, he appeared in 14 games and registered 26 catches for 396 yards and six touchdowns. He missed a majority of the 2019 season due to a concussion.

Following the 2019 season, Calcaterra announced he would be retiring from football due to suffering multiple concussions throughout his playing career. He did not play a game in 2020, but announced in November that he would return to football and play at Auburn University. In January 2021, he announced he would not be enrolling at Auburn. He announced later that month he would be enrolling at Southern Methodist University. For the 2021 season, he appeared in 11 games and caught 38 passes for 465 yards and four touchdowns.

=== Statistics ===
Year	Team	GP	Receiving				
Year	Team	GP	Rec	Yds	Avg	Lng	TD
2017	Oklahoma	5	10	162	16.2	21	3
2018	Oklahoma	12	26	396	15.2	35	6
2019	Oklahoma	3	5	79	15.8	24	0
2020	Oklahoma	Retired					
2021	SMU	11	38	465	12.2	29	4
Total		31	79	1,102	13.9	35	13

== Professional career ==
Pre-draft measurables
Height	Weight	Arm length	Hand span	Wingspan	40-yard dash	10-yard split	20-yard split	20-yard shuttle	Three-cone drill	Vertical jump	Bench press
6 ft 3 7/8 in (1.93 m)	241 lb (109 kg)	33 1/4 in (0.84 m)	10 in (0.25 m)	6 ft 7 7/8 in (2.03 m)	4.62 s	1.62 s	2.71 s	4.30 s	7.09 s	32.5 in (0.83 m)	20 reps
All values from NFL Combine/Pro Day

=== 2022 ===
Calcaterra was selected by the Philadelphia Eagles in the sixth round with the 198th overall pick of the 2022 NFL draft. He then signed a $3.8 million contract with the Eagles which included a $174,142 signing bonus. He made his NFL debut in Week 3 against the Washington Commanders, and caught a 40–yard pass from Jalen Hurts for his first career reception. As a rookie, he finished with five receptions for 81 yards in 15 games and two starts in the 2022 season.

=== 2023 ===
In the 2023 season, he finished with four receptions for 39 yards in 15 games and one start.

=== 2024 ===
Calcaterra scored his first career touchdown on December 8th against the Carolina Panthers.

During Week 16 of the 2024 season, Grant Calcaterra recorded a one handed catch from Kenny Pickett for a 34 yard gain on 3rd down and 8 against the Dallas Cowboys. He won a Super Bowl championship when the Eagles defeated the Kansas City Chiefs 40–22 in Super Bowl LIX.

=== 2026 ===
On March 13, 2026, Calcaterra signed a one-year contract extension with the Eagles. He was placed on injured reserve due to a lower lumbar back sprain on August 30. He was activated on October 26.

== NFL career statistics ==
Legend
	Won the Super Bowl
**Bold**	Career high

=== Regular season ===
Year	Team	Games		Receiving					Fumbles	
Year	Team	GP	GS	Rec	Yds	Avg	Lng	TD	Fum	Lost
2022	PHI	15	2	5	81	**16.2**	**40**	0	0	0
2023	PHI	15	1	4	39	9.8	12	0	0	0
2024	PHI	**17**	**13**	**24**	**298**	12.4	34	**1**	0	0
2025	PHI	15	6	9	76	8.4	16	1	0	0
Career		62	22	42	494	11.8	40	2	0	0

=== Postseason ===
Year	Team	Games		Receiving					Fumbles	
Year	Team	GP	GS	Rec	Yds	Avg	Lng	TD	Fum	Lost
2022	PHI	3	0	0	0	0	0	0	0	0
2023	PHI	1	0	0	0	0	0	0	0	0
2024	PHI	**4**	**1**	**1**	**4**	**4.0**	**4**	0	0	0
Career		8	1	1	4	4.0	4	0	0	0
