= Rodney Anderson (American football) =

American football player (born 1996)

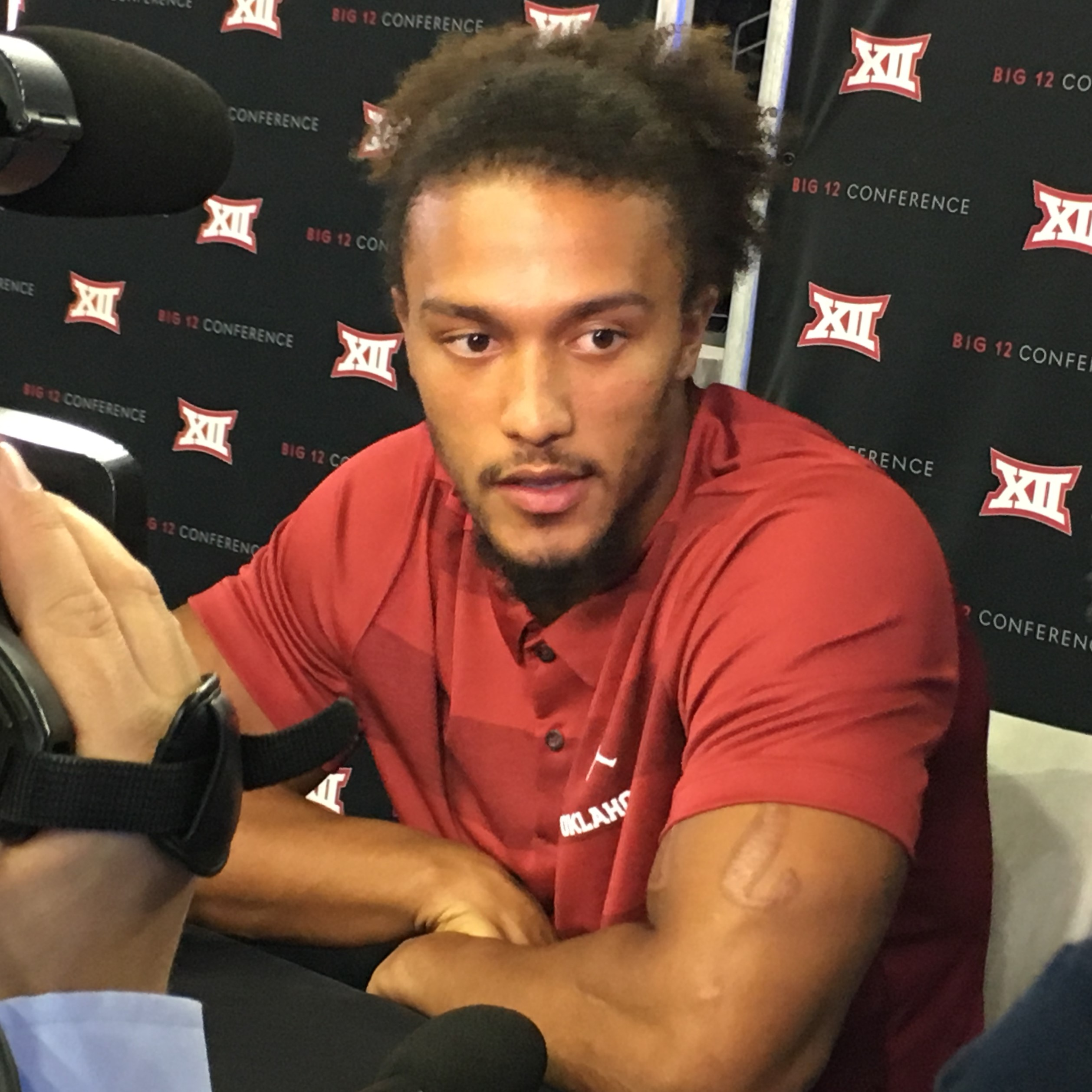
- Anderson in 2018

No. 33
- Position: Running back

Personal information
- Born: September 12, 1996 (age 30); Katy, Texas, U.S.
- Listed height: 6 ft 0 in (1.83 m)
- Listed weight: 224 lb (102 kg)

Career information
- High school: Katy
- College: Oklahoma (2015–2018)
- NFL draft: 2019: 6th round, 211th overall pick

Career history
- Cincinnati Bengals (2019)

Awards and highlights
- Second-team All-Big 12 (2017)
- Stats at Pro Football Reference

Rodney Anderson (born September 12, 1996) is an American former professional football player who was a running back in the National Football League (NFL). He played college football for the Oklahoma Sooners.

== Early life ==
Anderson had a standout high school career at Texas football powerhouse, Katy High School in Katy, Texas. Anderson saw his first varsity action as a freshman in 2011 due to some upperclassmen injuries. After winning the 5A state title as a sophomore in 2012, he would go on to be the number one feature back in 2013 and 2014, making the 5A state finals both seasons. Anderson amassed 5,493 career rushing yards on 603 carries. He originally committed to Texas A&M University to play college football but changed his commitment to the University of Oklahoma.

== College career ==
As a true freshman at Oklahoma in 2015, Anderson played in two games and had one carry for five yards before suffering a season-ending broken leg. Before the 2016 season, he suffered a neck injury which caused him to miss that season. Anderson returned from the injuries to rush for 1,161 yards on 188 carries and 13 touchdowns in 2017. In the 2018 Rose Bowl against Georgia, he rushed for 201 yards on 26 carries with two touchdowns. He played in the first two games of the 2018 season before suffering a season-ending knee injury in the second game on September 8.

== Professional career ==
Pre-draft measurables
Height	Weight	Arm length	Hand span	Bench press
6 ft 0 3/8 in (1.84 m)	224 lb (102 kg)	30 3/4 in (0.78 m)	9 3/4 in (0.25 m)	25 reps
All values from NFL Combine

Anderson was selected by the Cincinnati Bengals in the sixth round, 211th overall, of the 2019 NFL draft. He was placed on injured reserve on August 31, 2019, after suffering a torn ACL in the final preseason game. Anderson was placed on the active/physically unable to perform list at the start of training camp on July 29, 2020. He was waived with a failed physical designation on August 17.
