= Ben Powers (American football) =

American football player (born 1996)

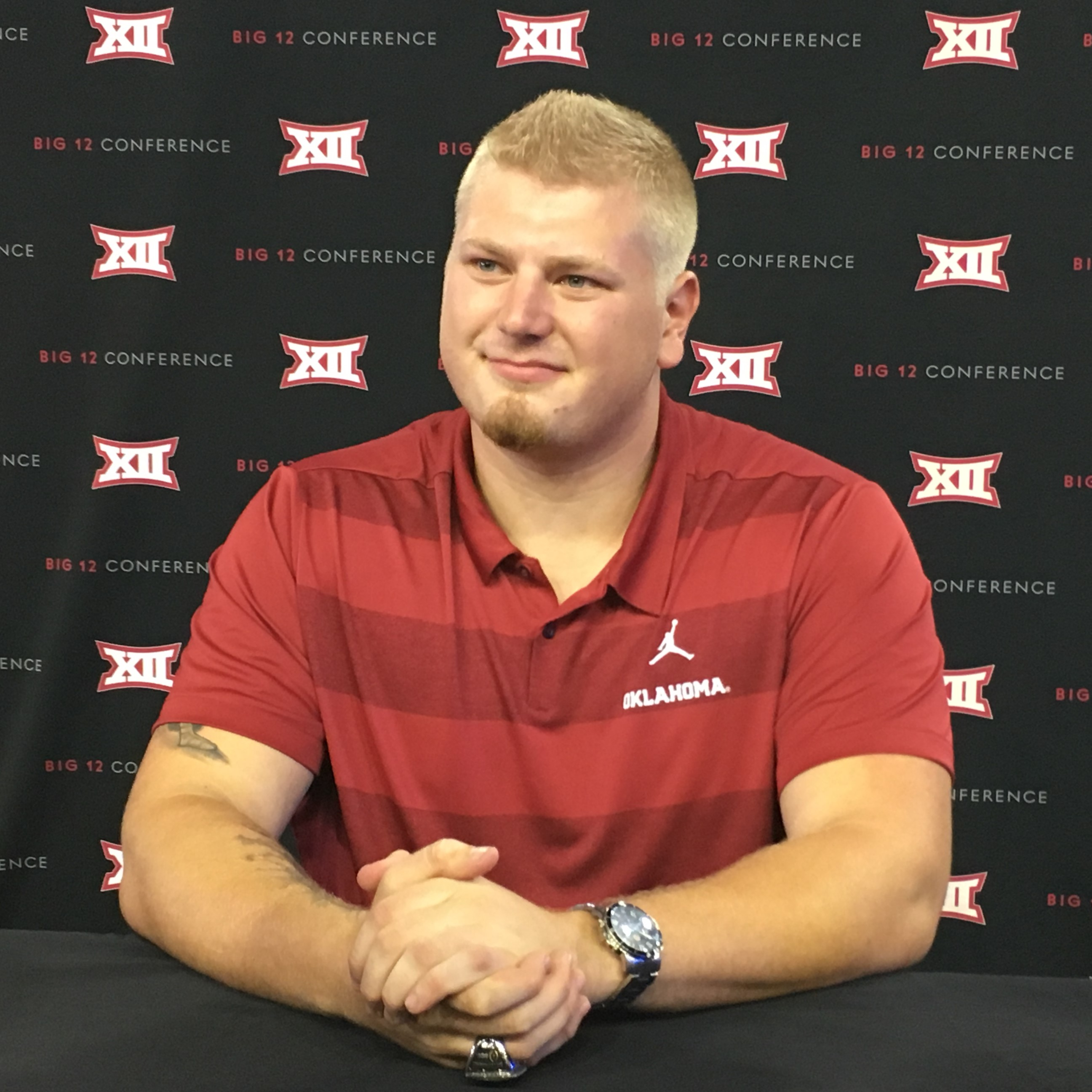
- Powers at 2018 Big 12 Media Days

No. 74 – Denver Broncos
- Position: Guard
- Roster status: Active

Personal information
- Born: October 29, 1996 (age 30); Wichita, Kansas, U.S.
- Listed height: 6 ft 4 in (1.93 m)
- Listed weight: 310 lb (141 kg)

Career information
- High school: Kapaun Mt. Carmel (Wichita)
- College: Butler CC (2015); Oklahoma (2016–2018)
- NFL draft: 2019: 4th round, 123rd overall pick

Career history
- Baltimore Ravens (2019–2022); Denver Broncos (2023–present)

Awards and highlights
- Consensus All-American (2018); First-team All-Big 12 (2018)

Career NFL statistics as of Week 18, 2025
- Games played: 89
- Games started: 76
- Stats at Pro Football Reference

Bennett Powers (born October 29, 1996) is an American professional football guard for the Denver Broncos of the National Football League (NFL). He first was drafted in 2019 in the 4th round for the Baltimore Ravens. He played college football for the Oklahoma Sooners.

== Early life ==
Powers attended high school in Wichita, Kansas at Kapaun Mt. Carmel Catholic High School. He got varsity letters in football and wrestling and finished second in the state wrestling finals. As a junior in high school, Powers, already 6 ft 4ins tall and weighed 280 pounds, played both on the offensive line and defensive line. After his senior football season, Powers received no scholarship from any major college or university.

== College career ==
After one year at Butler Community College, Powers enrolled at the University of Oklahoma. Following the 2018 season, Powers was named a consensus first-team All-American.

- Ravens draft Ben Powers Ravens video

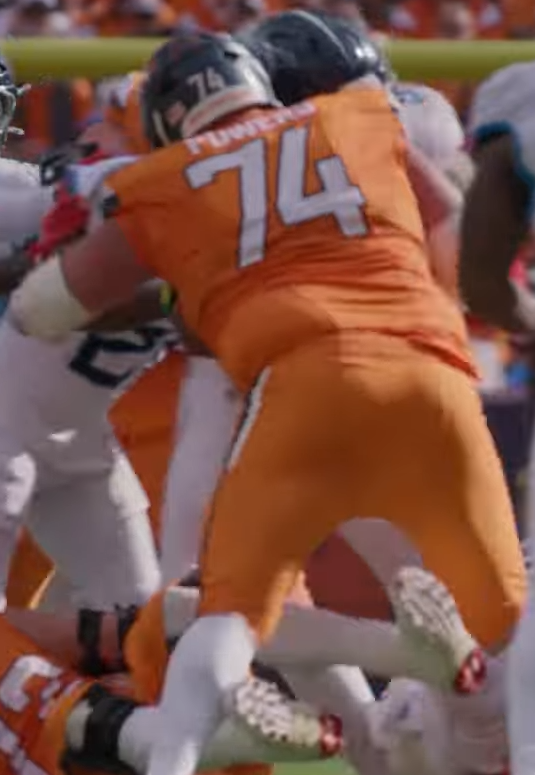
Powers with the Denver Broncos in 2025

== Professional career ==
Pre-draft measurables
Height	Weight	Arm length	Hand span	Wingspan	20-yard shuttle	Vertical jump	Broad jump	Bench press
6 ft 4 in (1.93 m)	307 lb (139 kg)	33 3/4 in (0.86 m)	9 7/8 in (0.25 m)	6 ft 9 3/4 in (2.08 m)	4.83 s	29.0 in (0.74 m)	8 ft 1 in (2.46 m)	21 reps
All values from NFL Combine/Pro Day

=== Baltimore Ravens ===
The Baltimore Ravens selected Powers with the 123rd overall pick in the fourth round of the 2019 NFL draft. His draft pick also became famous because Baltimore sports fan Mo Gaba, announced the pick on a draft card written in Braille. After making the active roster, he was placed on the inactive list for the first six weeks of his rookie season before making his debut in Week 17, playing the majority of snaps at right guard in the Ravens' 28–10 win over the Pittsburgh Steelers.

After beginning the 2020 season as a backup, he was named the starting right guard midseason due to injuries. He was the primary left guard in 2021, and was the full-time starter in 2022.

=== Denver Broncos ===
On March 16, 2023, Powers signed a four-year, $51.5 million contract with the Denver Broncos.

On October 6, 2025, Powers was placed on injured reserve after sustaining a biceps injury during the Broncos' Week 5 victory against the Philadelphia Eagles, with the expectation to return in December. On December 20, Powers was activated from injured reserve ahead of the team's Week 16 match-up against the Jacksonville Jaguars. It was later reported that Powers suffered a lisfranc injury during this game, but played through it for the rest of the season.

On July 27, 2026, Powers' contract was restructured to save salary cap space. The restructure brought his salary down from $12.49 million to $6 million.
