= Bobby Evans (offensive lineman) =

American football player (born 1997)

Profile
- Position: Offensive tackle

Personal information
- Born: March 24, 1997 (age 29); Allen, Texas, U.S.
- Listed height: 6 ft 4 in (1.93 m)
- Listed weight: 308 lb (140 kg)

Career information
- High school: Allen (TX)
- College: Oklahoma (2015–2018)
- NFL draft: 2019: 3rd round, 97th overall pick

Career history
- Los Angeles Rams (2019–2022); Minnesota Vikings (2022–2023)*; Jacksonville Jaguars (2023)*; Arlington Renegades (2024)
- * Offseason or practice squad member only

Awards and highlights
- Super Bowl champion (LVI); All-UFL Team (2024); First-team All-Big 12 (2018)

Career NFL statistics
- Games played: 35
- Games started: 12
- Stats at Pro Football Reference

Bobby Evans Jr. (born March 24, 1997) is an American professional football offensive tackle. He played college football at Oklahoma.

== Professional career ==
Pre-draft measurables
Height	Weight	Arm length	Hand span	40-yard dash	10-yard split	20-yard split	20-yard shuttle	Three-cone drill	Vertical jump	Broad jump	Bench press
6 ft 4 3/8 in (1.94 m)	312 lb (142 kg)	34 3/4 in (0.88 m)	9 7/8 in (0.25 m)	5.20 s	1.86 s	3.05 s	4.72 s	8.00 s	27.5 in (0.70 m)	9 ft 8 in (2.95 m)	22 reps
All values from NFL Combine/Pro Day

=== Los Angeles Rams ===
Evans was drafted by the Los Angeles Rams in the third round (97th overall) of the 2019 NFL draft.

Evans was placed on the reserve/COVID-19 list by the team on December 18, 2020, and activated on December 29.

Evans won his first Super Bowl ring when the Rams defeated the Cincinnati Bengals 23–20 in Super Bowl LVI.

On December 31, 2022, Evans was released by the Rams.

=== Minnesota Vikings ===
On January 3, 2023, Evans signed with the practice squad of the Minnesota Vikings. He re-signed with the team on July 25. Evans was released by Minnesota on August 3.

=== Jacksonville Jaguars ===
On August 13, 2023, Evans signed with the Jacksonville Jaguars. He was released on August 29.

=== Arlington Renegades ===
On December 8, 2023, Evans signed with the Arlington Renegades of the XFL. He was named to the 2024 All-UFL team on June 5, 2024.
