= Caleb Kelly (American football) =

American football player (born 1998)

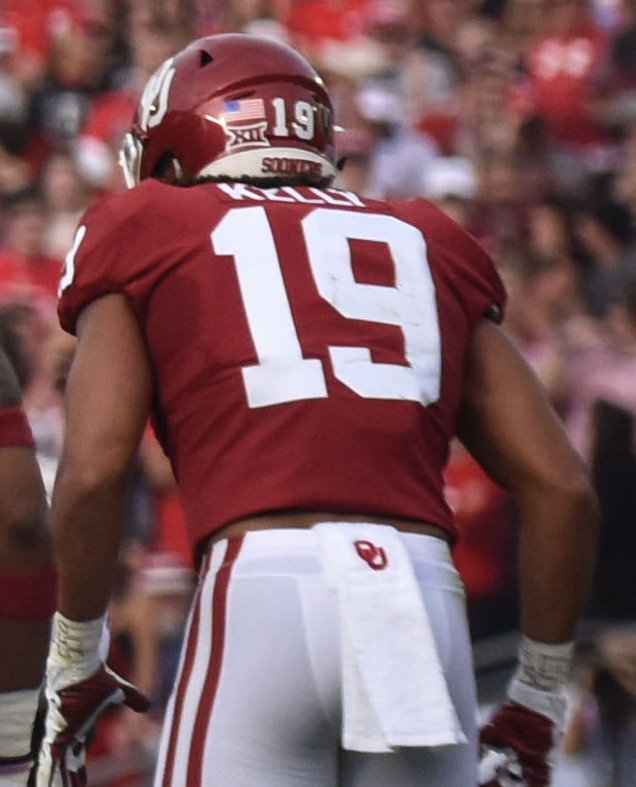
- Kelly in 2018

Profile
- Position: Linebacker

Personal information
- Born: March 28, 1998 (age 28); Fresno, California, U.S.
- Listed height: 6 ft 3 in (1.91 m)
- Listed weight: 229 lb (104 kg)

Career information
- High school: Fresno (CA) Clovis West
- College: Oklahoma (2016–2021)

Awards and highlights
- Freshman All-American (2016); High School Butkus Award (2015); USA Today All-American (2015)
- Stats at Pro Football Reference

Caleb Kanai Kelly (born March 28, 1998) is an American former football linebacker. He attended the University of Oklahoma from 2016 to 2022. As a senior at Clovis West High School in Fresno, California, Kelly won the 2015 Butkus Award given to the best linebacker in high school.

== Early life ==
Kelly played his whole high school career at Clovis West High School which is located in Fresno, California, He was a two-way player, playing wide receiver and running back on offense and linebacker on defense. While playing wide receiver in his junior and senior year at Clovis West High School he recorded 94 receptions for 1319 yards. As a senior on defense, he recorded 79 tackles and 10.0 sacks.

== Recruitment ==
Kelly received numerous offers from top programs in the country including the Michigan Wolverines, Notre Dame Fighting Irish, Alabama Crimson Tide, Florida State Seminoles, Georgia Bulldogs, Ohio State Buckeyes, Stanford Cardinal, USC Trojans and the Oklahoma Sooners. Kelly committed to the Oklahoma Sooners on national signing day.

College recruiting
Name	Hometown	School	Height	Weight	40^{‡}	Commit date
Caleb Kelly; LB	Fresno, California	Clovis West High School	6 ft 3 in (1.91 m)	229 lb (104 kg)	-	Feb 3, 2016
Caleb Kelly; LB	Recruit ratings: Scout: Rivals: 247Sports: (85)					
Overall recruit ranking: Scout: 3 (LB); 2 (West); 2 (CA) Rivals: 2 (LB); 14 (Natl); 3 (CA) 247Sports: 68 (Natl); 6 (LB); 9 (CA) ESPN: 7 (LB); 3 (West); 2 (CA)
Note: In many cases, Scout, Rivals, 247Sports, On3, and ESPN may conflict in their listings of height and weight.; In these cases, the average was taken. ESPN grades are on a 100-point scale.; Sources: "Oklahoma Football Commitments". Rivals.; "2016 Oklahoma Football Commits". Scout.; "ESPN". ESPN.; "Scout.com Team Recruiting Rankings". Scout.; "2016 Team Ranking". Rivals.com.

== College career ==
Freshman

Kelly played as a true freshman at Oklahoma, and was named a Freshman All-American by Pro Football Focus, Kelly played in ten games and started in five of them. He recorded, 24 tackles, 2 tackles for a loss, 1.0 sack and had 1 pass breakup.

Sophomore

In Kelly's sophomore year he played in 13 games and starting in 12 of them. Kelly recorded a total of 52 tackles, 3.5 tackles for a loss, 1.0 sack, 1 forced fumble and 2 pass breakups. Kelly was named as an All-Big 12 Honorable Mention by the league's coaches.

Junior

Kelly played in 12 games, while only starting in five. Ranked fourth on team with 61 tackles. Recorded 3.0 sacks and had 2.0 forced fumbles.

Senior

Kelly missed the first 10 games of the season, due to an ACL tear, before playing in the final four, including a loss to LSU in the CFP semifinal Peach Bowl in December 2019.

Redshirt senior

In August 2020, Kelly again tore his ACL and was expected to miss the entire season. He is expected to return for a medical redshirt senior season in 2021.

Medical redshirt senior

Played in the first 5 games of the season recording 18 total tackles before suffering a career ending, third knee injury.

== Other activities ==
Kelley returned to his hometown of Fresno to participate in a protest for racial justice in June 2020 after the murder of George Floyd.
