= Carson Meier =

American football player (born 1995)

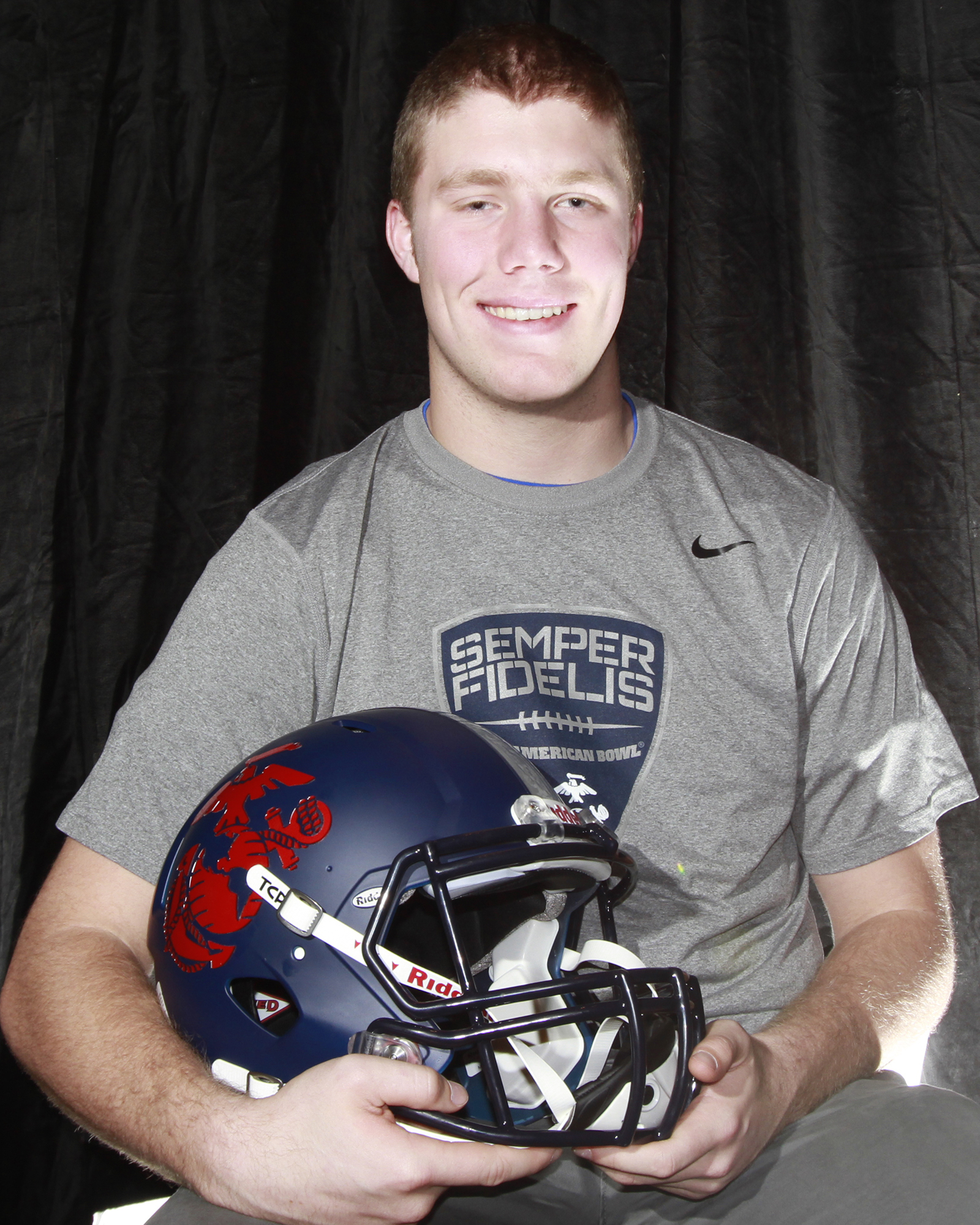
- Meier c. 2014

No. 85
- Position: Tight end

Personal information
- Born: June 29, 1995 (age 31); Tulsa, Oklahoma, U.S.
- Listed height: 6 ft 5 in (1.96 m)
- Listed weight: 260 lb (118 kg)

Career information
- High school: Union High (Tulsa)
- College: Oklahoma
- NFL draft: 2019: undrafted

Career history
- Jacksonville Jaguars (2019)*; Atlanta Falcons (2019); Miami Dolphins (2021)*
- * Offseason or practice squad member only

Career NFL statistics
- Games played: 1
- Stats at Pro Football Reference

Carson Meier (born June 29, 1995) is an American former professional football player who was a tight end in the National Football League (NFL). He played college football for the Oklahoma Sooners.

== College career ==
Meier was a member of the Oklahoma Sooners for five seasons, redshirting his true freshman season. He spent the next three seasons playing special teams and the H-back position, where he was used exclusively as a blocker. As a redshirt senior, Meier caught 19 receptions for 327 yards and four touchdowns and was named second-team All-Big 12 Conference by the league's coaches.

== Professional career ==
=== Jacksonville Jaguars ===
Meier signed with the Jacksonville Jaguars as an undrafted free agent April 27, 2019. He was cut by the Jaguars at the end of training camp.

=== Atlanta Falcons ===
Meier was signed to the Atlanta Falcons practice squad on September 3, 2019. Meier was promoted to the Falcons' active roster on November 27. He made his NFL debut the next day, starting at tight end against the New Orleans Saints. He was waived on December 7, 2019. Meier was re-signed to the Falcons' practice squad on December 10, 2019. On December 30, 2019, Meier was signed to a reserve/future contract. He was waived with an injury settlement on August 14, 2020.

=== Miami Dolphins ===
On July 26, 2021, Meier signed with the Miami Dolphins. He was waived on August 16.
