= Curtis Bolton =

American football player (born 1995)

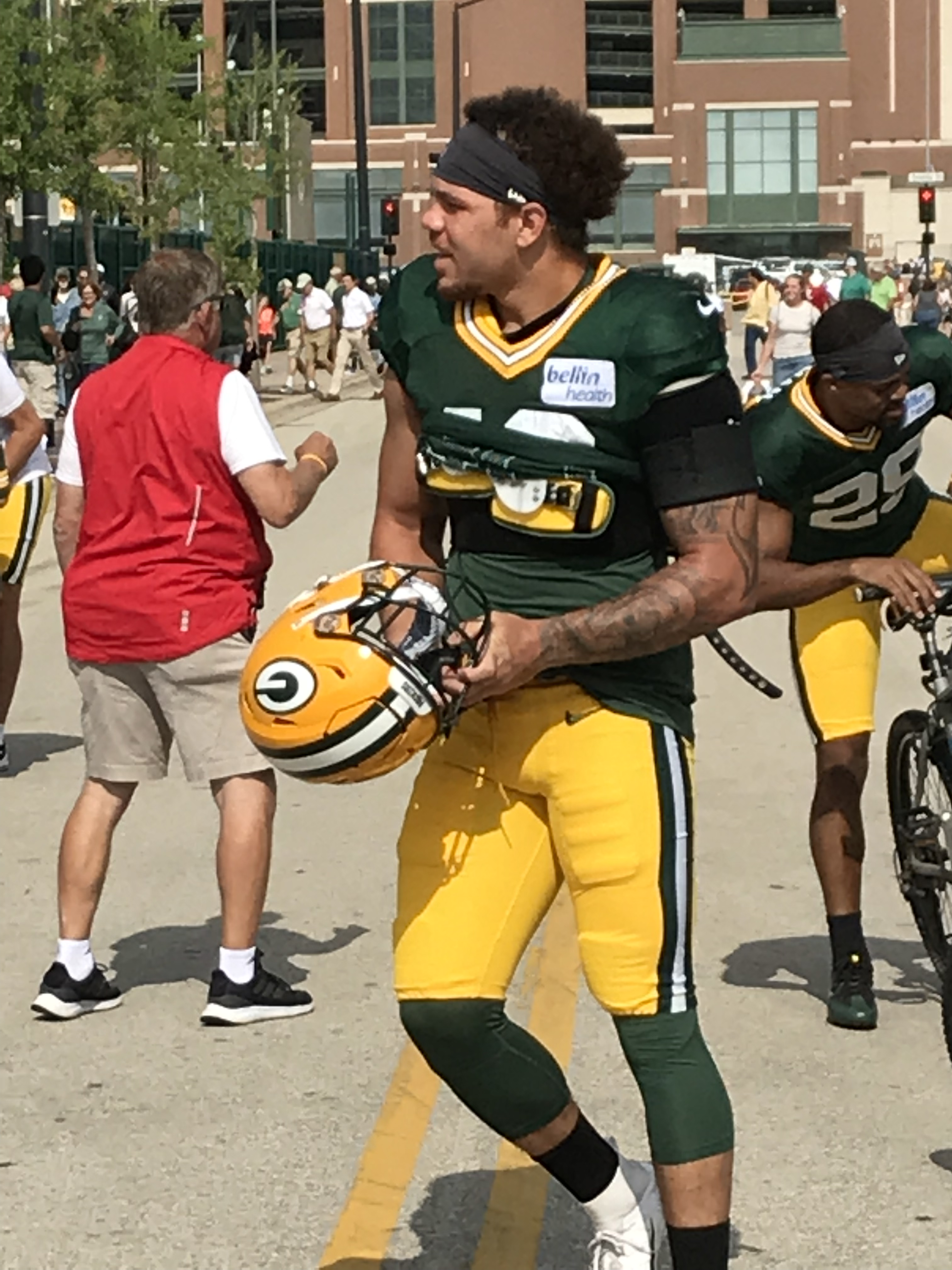
- Bolton with the Green Bay Packers in 2019

Profile
- Position: Linebacker

Personal information
- Born: December 18, 1995 (age 30); Honolulu, Hawaii, U.S.
- Listed height: 6 ft 0 in (1.83 m)
- Listed weight: 228 lb (103 kg)

Career information
- High school: Vista Murrieta (Murrieta, California)
- College: Oklahoma (2014–2018)
- NFL draft: 2019: undrafted

Career history
- Green Bay Packers (2019–2020); Houston Texans (2020)*; Indianapolis Colts (2021)*; San Francisco 49ers (2021)*; Detroit Lions (2021); Las Vegas Raiders (2022–2023); Miami Dolphins (2024)*; New York Giants (2024); Tennessee Titans (2024)*
- * Offseason or practice squad member only

Career NFL statistics as of 2024
- Total tackles: 16
- Stats at Pro Football Reference

Curtis Giles Charles Bolton III (December 18, 1995) is an American former professional football player who was a linebacker in the National Football League (NFL). He playecd for the Detroit Lions, Las Vegas Raiders, and New York Giants. He played college football for the Oklahoma Sooners.

== Early life ==
Bolton finished his senior season with 109 tackles including 29 for a loss and 13 sacks while being named defensive MVP of the Southwestern league. Bolton committed to Oklahoma over offers for Arizona, Fresno State and others. He is of Italian descent.

== College career ==
Bolton started one season at the University of Oklahoma, his senior season. He recorded 138 tackles, 12 tackles for loss, 4.5 sacks and 2 pass deflected.

== Professional career ==
Pre-draft measurables
Height	Weight	Arm length	Hand span	40-yard dash	10-yard split	20-yard split	20-yard shuttle	Three-cone drill	Vertical jump	Broad jump	Bench press
6 ft 0 1/8 in (1.83 m)	228 lb (103 kg)	31 7/8 in (0.81 m)	10 3/8 in (0.26 m)	4.59 s	1.57 s	2.67 s	4.35 s	7.19 s	38.0 in (0.97 m)	9 ft 11 in (3.02 m)	17 reps
All values from Pro Day

=== Green Bay Packers ===
After going undrafted Bolton signed with the Green Bay Packers. He started the preseason totaling 8 tackles, two pass deflections and an interception in the first two preseason games. Bolton tore his anterior cruciate ligament in a preseason game and was placed on the season-ending injured reserve. He was placed on the active/physically unable to perform list (PUP) at the start of training camp on July 31, 2020. He was moved to the reserve/PUP list at the start of the regular season on September 5, 2020. On October 6, 2020, Bolton was waived by the Packers.

=== Houston Texans ===
On November 10, 2020, Bolton was signed to the practice squad of the Houston Texans. He signed a reserve/future contract on January 4, 2021. He was waived on March 16, 2021.

=== Indianapolis Colts ===
On August 10, 2021, Bolton signed with the Indianapolis Colts. He was waived on August 31, 2021, and re-signed to the practice squad the next day, but released two days later.

=== San Francisco 49ers ===
On September 14, 2021, Bolton was signed to the San Francisco 49ers practice squad. He was released on October 5.

=== Detroit Lions ===
On December 1, 2021, Bolton was signed to the Detroit Lions practice squad. Bolton made his NFL debut in a game against the Denver Broncos on December 12, 2021. He was promoted to the active roster on December 28.

On April 27, 2022, Bolton was waived by the Lions.

=== Las Vegas Raiders ===
On August 1, 2022, Bolton signed with the Las Vegas Raiders. He was waived on August 30, 2022, and signed to the practice squad the next day. On October 10, 2022, Bolton was elevated to the active roster for the week 5 game against the Kansas City Chiefs. He was promoted to the active roster on November 10.

On March 18, 2023, Bolton re-signed with the Raiders. He was placed on injured reserve on September 30. He was activated on October 30.

=== Miami Dolphins ===
On July 27, 2024, Bolton was signed by the Miami Dolphins. He was released on August 27.

=== New York Giants ===
On August 28, 2024, Bolton signed with the New York Giants. He was waived on September 7, but re-signed to the practice squad two days later. On November 19, Bolton was waived from the practice squad.

=== Tennessee Titans ===
On December 10, 2024, Bolton signed with the Tennessee Titans practice squad. He signed a reserve/future contract on January 6, 2025.

On April 16, 2025, Bolton was released by the Titans.
