= Jamarkus McFarland =

American gridiron football player and coach (born 1990)

TCU Horned Frogs
- Title: Defensive line coach

Personal information
- Born: November 26, 1990 (age 35); Lufkin, Texas, U.S.
- Listed height: 6 ft 2 in (1.88 m)
- Listed weight: 305 lb (138 kg)

Career information
- High school: Lufkin (TX)
- College: Oklahoma (2009–2012)
- NFL draft: 2013: undrafted

Career history

Playing
- San Diego Chargers (2013)*; BC Lions (2015); Winnipeg Blue Bombers (2015)
- * Offseason or practice squad member only

Coaching
- Oklahoma (2016–2018) Graduate assistant; Stephen F. Austin (2019–2021) Defensive tackles coach; TCU (2022–present) Defensive line coach
- Stats at Pro Football Reference

Jamarkus McFarland (born November 26, 1990) is an American football coach and former defensive tackle. He is currently the defensive line coach at TCU. McFarland was considered one of the best defensive tackle prospects of his class coming out of high school.

== Early life ==
McFarland attended Lufkin High School in Texas, where he was teammates with Dez Bryant and Carrington Byndom and accounted for 53 tackles, 10 tackles for loss and four quarterback sacks in 2008. He was a 2008 first-team all-class by Texas Football, a second-team Texas all-state selection and also named Texas Academic all-state. He also was named district 15-5A Defensive MVP as a junior in 2007.

As a senior, McFarland was a USA Today and Parade All-American. He also played in the 2009 U.S. Army All-American Bowl. Considered a four-star recruit by Rivals.com, McFarland was listed as the No. 6 defensive tackle prospect in the nation, as well as the third-best run stuffer among defensive tackles. He was ranked third among the nation defensive tackles in the nation by Scout.com, who graded him as a five-star recruit.

McFarland picked Oklahoma over Texas, LSU and Southern California. His recruitment was the topic of a New York Times story, which included a passage describing a lavish party with free alcohol and drugs and topless women hosted by Texas boosters in Dallas.

== College career ==
Because of the Sooners' depth at defensive tackle, McFarland was expected to redshirt in 2009. However, he saw some action in seven games as backup defensive tackle. He had a career-high two tackles in three games, and a career-high 1.5 sacks against Texas A&M. McFarland was named an All-Big 12 freshman by ESPN.com.

As a sophomore, McFarland appeared in all 14 games, starting three. He had his first career sack against Iowa State, finishing with 1.5 on the day. In his junior season, he played in 13 games and started 7, recording 21 tackles for the season.

In his senior year, McFarland became a full-time starter, starting in 12 contests. He recorded a career-high 28 tackles for the year, including six for a loss of yardage.

== Professional career ==
McFarland was ranked 55th among defensive tackles available in the 2013 NFL draft.

He went undrafted in the 2013 NFL draft.

=== San Diego Chargers ===
McFarland was signed by the San Diego Chargers. On August 25, 2013, he was cut by the Chargers.

=== BC Lions ===
McFarland was signed by the BC Lions in May 2015, joining their practice roster in June.

== Coaching career ==
McFarland joined Oklahoma's coaching staff as a graduate assistant in January 2016.
