= Bill Bedenbaugh =

American football player and coach (born 1972)

Current position
- Title: Offensive line coach
- Team: Oklahoma
- Conference: SEC
- Annual salary: $870,000

Biographical details
- Born: August 21, 1972 (age 54)

Playing career
- 1991–1994: Iowa Wesleyan
- Position: Center

Coaching career (HC unless noted)
- 1995: Oklahoma Panhandle State (OL)
- 1996: Valdosta State (OL)
- 1997–1998: Central Michigan (GA)
- 1999: Ferris State (co-OC/OL)
- 2000–2002: Texas Tech (GA)
- 2003–2004: Texas Tech (RB)
- 2005–2006: Texas Tech (OL)
- 2007–2009: Arizona (OL)
- 2010: Arizona (co-OC/OL)
- 2011–2012: West Virginia (OL)
- 2013–2016: Oklahoma (OL)
- 2017–2021: Oklahoma (co-OC/OL)
- 2022–present: Oklahoma (OL)

Bill Bedenbaugh (born August 21, 1972) is an American football coach and former player. He is the current offensive line coach at the University of Oklahoma. He was the offensive line coach starting in 2013 and was promoted to co-OC prior to the 2017 season. Bedenbaugh is a spread offense offensive line coach from the Mike Leach coaching tree.

== Coaching career ==
=== Early Coaching Career ===
Bedenbaugh began his coaching career as the offensive line coach at Oklahoma Panhandle State University in 1995. He lived in the dorms and made $150 a week.

=== Valdosta State ===
After that, he moved on to Valdosta State as the offensive line coach for the 1996 season.

=== Central Michigan ===
From there, Bedenbaugh joined the Central Michigan staff as a graduate assistant during the 1997 and 1998 seasons.

=== Ferris State ===
In 1999, Bedenbaugh was the offensive line coach and co-offensive coordinator at Ferris State in Michigan. In his lone season, he was named Footballscoop.com's division II Coordinator of the Year.

=== Texas Tech ===
Following his success at Ferris State, Bedenbaugh joined up with his college coach, Mike Leach, at Texas Tech as a graduate assistant. He spent 2000-2002 as a GA before being promoted to running backs coach for 2003 and 2004, and then 2005 and 2006 as offensive line coach.

=== Arizona ===
In 2007, Bedenbaugh joined Arizona as offensive line coach. In the last year of his four-year stint, he was promoted to co-offensive coordinator.

=== West Virginia ===
In 2011, Bedenbaugh was hired by his former Iowa Wesleyan teammate Dana Holgorsen as the offensive line coach for the West Virginia Mountaineers. He held this post for two seasons.

=== Oklahoma ===
Bob Stoops hired Bedenbaugh to be the offensive line coach at Oklahoma prior to the 2013 season. Following Stoops’ retirement, and Lincoln Riley’s subsequent promotion to head coach in the summer of 2017, Riley promoted Bedenbaugh to co-offensive coordinator.

== Playing career ==
Bill Bedenbaugh was a four-year starter on the offensive line playing center at Iowa Wesleyan for head coach Hal Mumme and offensive coordinator Mike Leach. He played from 1991-1994.

== Personal life ==
Bedenbaugh is a native of St. Charles, Illinois and is married to Maryde, who is from Tahlequah, Oklahoma. They met during Bedenbaugh's stint at Oklahoma Panhandle State.
