= 2018 Texas Longhorns football team =

American college football season

2018 Texas Longhorns football

Sugar Bowl champion

Big 12 Championship Game, L 27–39 vs. Oklahoma

Sugar Bowl, W 28–21 vs. Georgia
- Conference: Big 12 Conference

Ranking
- Coaches: No. 9
- AP: No. 9
- Record: 10–4 (7–2 Big 12)
- Head coach: Tom Herman (2nd season)
- Offensive coordinator: Tim Beck (2nd season)
- Co-offensive coordinator: Herb Hand (1st season)
- Offensive scheme: Spread
- Defensive coordinator: Todd Orlando (2nd season)
- Base defense: 3–4
- Captains: Andrew Beck; Breckyn Hager; Chris Nelson; Elijah Rodriguez; Anthony Wheeler
- Home stadium: Darrell K Royal–Texas Memorial Stadium

2018 Big 12 Conference football standings
	Conf.			Overall
Team	W		L	W		L
No. 4 Oklahoma y$^	8	–	1	12	–	2
No. 9 Texas y	7	–	2	10	–	4
Iowa State	6	–	3	8	–	5
No. 20 West Virginia	6	–	3	8	–	4
TCU	4	–	5	7	–	6
Baylor	4	–	5	7	–	6
Oklahoma State	3	–	6	7	–	6
Kansas State	3	–	6	5	–	7
Texas Tech	3	–	6	5	–	7
Kansas	1	–	8	3	–	9
Championship: Oklahoma 39, Texas 27
^ – College Football Playoff participant; $ – Conference champion; y – Championship game participant; Rankings from AP Poll

The 2018 Texas Longhorns football team, known variously as "Texas", "UT", the "Longhorns", or the "Horns”, represented the University of Texas at Austin during the 2018 NCAA Division I FBS football season. The Longhorns played their home games at Darrell K Royal–Texas Memorial Stadium in Austin, Texas, and competed as members of the Big 12 Conference. They were led by second-year head coach Tom Herman.

Texas, coming off a 7–6 season in Herman's first year, began the year ranked 23rd in the preseason AP Poll. In the first game of the year, the Longhorns were upset by Maryland in a game played at FedExField in Landover, Maryland. The team won its next six games, including a dramatic win over No. 7 Oklahoma in the 113th Red River Showdown. The Longhorns rose to as high as No. 6 in the AP Poll, but fell in consecutive weeks to Oklahoma State and West Virginia. At the end of the regular season, Texas had a record of 7–2 in Big 12 play, good for second in the standings and earning them a spot in the Big 12 Championship Game against Oklahoma. The Sooners won the rematch by a score of 39–27. Texas was invited to the Sugar Bowl to play SEC runner-up No. 5 Georgia, which Texas won in an upset by a score of 28–21. They finished with an overall record of 10–4 and were ranked 9th in the final AP Poll, the most wins and highest ranked finish for the school since 2009.

The team was led on offense by sophomore quarterback Sam Ehlinger, who finished with 3,292 passing yards, 25 passing touchdowns, and a Big 12-leading 16 rushing touchdowns. His 41 total touchdowns was third in the conference and seventh nationally. Wide receiver Lil'Jordan Humphrey led the team with 1,176 receiving yards. On defense, the team had three first-team all-conference members in defensive lineman Charles Omenihu and defensive backs Kris Boyd and Caden Sterns.

== Preseason ==
=== Award watch lists ===
Listed in the order that they were released

Award	Player	Position	Year
Rimington Trophy	Zach Shackelford	C	JR
Chuck Bednarik Award	Breckyn Hager	DE	SR
Chuck Bednarik Award	Gary Johnson	LB	SR
Fred Biletnikoff Award	Collin Johnson	WR	JR
John Mackey Award	Andrew Beck	TE	SR
Butkus Award	Gary Johnson	LB	SR
Jim Thorpe Award	Kris Boyd	DB	SR
Bronko Nagurski Trophy	Kris Boyd	DB	SR
Outland Trophy	Patrick Vahe	OL	SR
Wuerffel Trophy	Collin Johnson	WR	JR
Walter Camp Award	Collin Johnson	WR	JR
Ted Hendricks Award	Breckyn Hager	DE	SR
Earl Campbell Tyler Rose Award	Collin Johnson	WR	JR

=== Big 12 media poll ===
The Big 12 media poll was released on July 12, 2018 with the Longhorns predicted to finish in fourth place.

== Schedule ==
Date	Time	Opponent	Rank	Site	TV	Result	Attendance
September 1	11:00 a.m.	vs. Maryland*	No. 23	FedExField; Landover, MD	FS1	L 29–34	47,641
September 8	7:00 p.m.	Tulsa*		Darrell K Royal–Texas Memorial Stadium; Austin, TX	LHN	W 28–21	90,563
September 15	7:00 p.m.	No. 22 USC*		Darrell K Royal–Texas Memorial Stadium; Austin, TX	FOX	W 37–14	103,507^{‡}
September 22	3:30 p.m.	No. 17 TCU		Darrell K Royal–Texas Memorial Stadium; Austin, TX (rivalry)	FOX	W 31–16	95,124
September 29	2:30 p.m.	at Kansas State	No. 18	Bill Snyder Family Football Stadium; Manhattan, KS	FS1	W 19–14	49,916
October 6	11:00 a.m.	vs. No. 7 Oklahoma	No. 19	Cotton Bowl; Dallas, TX (Red River Showdown, College GameDay)	FOX	W 48–45	92,300
October 13	2:30 p.m.	Baylor	No. 9	Darrell K Royal–Texas Memorial Stadium; Austin, TX (rivalry)	ESPN	W 23–17	93,882
October 27	7:00 p.m.	at Oklahoma State	No. 6	Boone Pickens Stadium; Stillwater, OK	ABC	L 35–38	56,790
November 3	2:30 p.m.	No. 13 West Virginia	No. 17	Darrell K Royal–Texas Memorial Stadium; Austin, TX	FOX	L 41–42	100,703
November 10	6:30 p.m.	at Texas Tech	No. 19	Jones AT&T Stadium; Lubbock, TX (rivalry)	FOX	W 41–34	60,454
November 17	7:00 p.m.	No. 16 Iowa State	No. 15	Darrell K Royal–Texas Memorial Stadium; Austin, TX	LHN	W 24–10	102,498
November 23	11:00 a.m.	at Kansas	No. 14	David Booth Kansas Memorial Stadium; Lawrence, KS	FS1	W 24–17	15,219
December 1	11:00 a.m.	vs. No. 5 Oklahoma	No. 14	AT&T Stadium; Arlington, TX (Big 12 Championship Game)	ABC	L 27–39	83,114
January 1, 2019	7:30 p.m.	vs. No. 5 Georgia*	No. 15	Mercedes-Benz Superdome; New Orleans, LA (Sugar Bowl)	ESPN	W 28–21	71,449
*Non-conference game; Rankings from AP Poll and CFP Rankings after October 30 released prior to game; All times are in Central time

- ^‡At the time, largest attendance recorded at Darrell K. Royal–Texas Memorial Stadium

== Personnel ==
=== Roster ===
2018 Texas Longhorns football team roster
Players
Coaches
Offense

Pos.	#	Name	Class
WR	1	John Burt	Sr
RB	5	Tre Watson	GS
WR	6	Devin Duvernay	Jr
QB	7	Shane Buechele	Jr
OL	69	Austin Allsup	Sr
OL	66	Calvin Anderson	GS
OL	75	Junior Angilau	Fr
TE	47	Andrew Beck	Sr
TE	80	Cade Brewer	So
RB	30	Toneil Carter	So
OL	52	Sam Cosmi	Fr
WR	82	Brennan Eagles	Fr
QB	11	Sam Ehlinger	So
TE	85	Malcolm Epps	Fr
TE	89	Chris Fehr	Sr
OL	74	Rafiti Ghirmai	Fr
OL	58	Mikey Grandy	So
WR	13	Jerrod Heard	Sr
RB	41	Tristian Houston	Jr
OL	73	Patrick Hudson	So
WR	84	Lil'Jordan Humphrey	Jr
OL	67	Tope Imade	So
RB	26	Keaontay Ingram	Fr
WR	9	Collin Johnson	Jr
RB	28	Kirk Johnson	Jr
OL	70	Christian Jones	Fr
OL	68	Derek Kerstetter	So
TE	81	Reese Leitao	Fr
WR	85	Philipp Moeller	Sr
WR	14	Joshua Moore	Fr
OL	76	Reese Moore	Fr
OL	78	Denzel Okafor	Jr
RB	21	Kyle Porter	Jr
WR	86	Jordan Pouncey	Fr
QB	3	Cameron Rising	Fr
OL	72	Elijah Rodriguez	Sr
OL	56	Zach Shackelford	Jr
QB	8	Casey Thompson	Fr
OL	71	J.P. Urquidez	So
OL	77	Patrick Vahe	Sr
WR	83	Al'Vonte Woodard	Fr
RB	30	Tim Yoder	Sr
RB	32	Daniel Young	So

Defense

Pos.	#	Name	Class
LB	40	Ayodele Adeoye	Fr
LB	42	Marquez Bimage	So
DB	38	Kobe Boyce	Fr
LB	36	Demarco Boyd	So
DB	2	Kris Boyd	Sr
DB	15	Chris Brown	So
DL	88	Daniel Carson	Fr
DL	91	Jamari Chisholm	Sr
DL	98	D'Andre Christmas	Jr
DL	99	Keondre Coburn	Jr
DB	4	Anthony Cook	Fr
DL	92	Max Cummins	Fr
DB	18	Davante Davis	Sr
DB	24	Jamarquis Durst	Sr
DB	27	Donovan Duvernay	So
DB	39	Montrell Estell	Fr
DL	48	Andrew Fitzgerald	So
DB	25	B.J. Foster	Fr
LB	35	Edwin Freeman	Sr
DL	49	Ta'Quon Graham	So
DB	3	Jalen Green	Fr
DL	44	Breckyn Hager	Sr
LB	50	Byron Vaughns	Sr
LB	31	Kyle Hrncir	Jr
DB	17	D'Shawn Jamison	Fr
LB	33	Gary Johnson	Sr
DB	19	Brandon Jones	Jr
DB	11	P. J. Locke	Sr
LB	23	Jeffrey McCulloch	Jr
DL	97	Chris Nelson	Sr
DL	98	Moro Ojomo	Fr
DL	90	Charles Omenihu	Sr
LB	46	Joseph Ossai	Fr
DB	31	DeMarvion Overshown	Fr
LB	39	Edward Pequeno	Jr
DL	32	Malcolm Roach	Jr
DB	7	Caden Sterns	Fr
DB	29	Josh Thompson	So
LB	43	Cameron Townsend	Jr
LB	45	Anthony Wheeler	Sr
DL	94	Gerald Wilbon	Jr
DL	37	Mike Williams	Fr

Special teams

Pos.	#	Name	Class
P	8	Ryan Bujcevski	Fr
K	17	Cameron Dicker	Fr
P	37	Jack Geiger	Fr
LS	53	Jak Holbrook	Sr
K	45	Chris Maggar	So
K	49	Joshua Rowland	Sr
LS	54	Justin Mader	Fr
LS	83	Michael David Poujol	So

Head coach

- Tom Herman

Coordinators/assistant coaches

- Tim Beck – Offensive coordinator/quarterbacks
- Stan Drayton – Associate head coach/Run Game Coordinator/running backs
- Oscar Giles – Defensive line
- Herb Hand – Co-offensive coordinator/offensive line
- Corby Meekins – Wide receivers
- Drew Mehringer – Pass Game Coordinator/wide receivers
- Craig Naivar – Co-defensive coordinator/safeties
- Todd Orlando – Defensive coordinator/linebackers
- Darek Warehime – Special teams coordinator/tight ends
- Jason Washington – Recruiting coordinator/cornerbacks
- Yancy McKnight – Strength and Conditioning

Legend

- (C) Team captain
- (S) Suspended
- (I) Ineligible
- Injured
- Redshirt

Roster
Last update: April 8, 2019

== Game summaries ==
=== vs Maryland ===
	1	2	3	4	Total
No. 23 Longhorns	7	15	7	0	29
Terrapins	14	10	0	10	34

=== Tulsa ===
	1	2	3	4	Total
Golden Hurricane	0	0	7	14	21
Longhorns	14	7	0	7	28

=== USC ===
	1	2	3	4	Total
No. 22 Trojans	14	0	0	0	14
Longhorns	3	13	21	0	37

900th Program Win

=== TCU ===
	1	2	3	4	Total
No. 17 Horned Frogs	6	7	3	0	16
Longhorns	7	3	14	7	31

=== At Kansas State ===
	1	2	3	4	Total
No. 18 Longhorns	7	12	0	0	19
Wildcats	0	0	7	7	14

Texas lost their first game on the road at Maryland and then won their next three games at home, and their last two victories came against ranked teams—No. 22 Southern California and No. 17 TCU. But the travel games (especially in this series) have not been in the Longhorn's favor. The home team has won last six games between the two teams and Texas has not won in Manhattan since 2002.

Texas was the only team to score in the first half of play, with two touchdowns, a field goal, and a safety. Kansas State had a chance to score a touchdown on the final play of the first half when Alex Delton threw a pass to Adam Harter that was dropped in the end zone. The score at the half was Texas 19, Kansas State 0.

Kansas State fared better in the second half, holding Texas scoreless and replacing Alex Delton with Skylar Thompson. Thompson led Kansas State to score two touchdowns in the second half with 14 points. In the end, Texas held the lead with a final score of 19-14. For the next week Texas plays Oklahoma after stopping the second-half comeback by Kansas State.

=== vs Oklahoma ===
	1	2	3	4	Total
No. 7 Sooners	7	10	7	21	45
No. 19 Longhorns	10	14	21	3	48

The 2018 edition of this classic rivalry matchup was pivotal for both the Longhorns and the Sooners, as both had something to prove; OU was playing its first ranked opponent of the season, and Texas was trying to show that it could once again compete with the elite of the NCAA after years of very average performances. This year's game, which ended in a Longhorn victory, was the highest-scoring Red River Showdown game in history, with a combined score of 93. A memorable aspect of this game was Texas' dominance until midway through the fourth quarter, only to eventually surrender a 21-point lead to the Sooners late in the game; Heisman candidate Kyler Murray put on an incredible performance, showcasing his superior speed and accuracy. This comeback, however, did not come to fruition, as Texas kicker Cameron Dicker made a 40-yard field goal with approximately 9 seconds remaining on the clock to win the game for Texas.

=== Baylor ===
	1	2	3	4	Total
Bears	7	3	7	0	17
No. 9 Longhorns	3	20	0	0	23

=== At Oklahoma State ===
	1	2	3	4	Total
No. 6 Longhorns	7	7	7	14	35
Cowboys	17	14	0	7	38

=== West Virginia ===
	1	2	3	4	Total
No. 12 Mountaineers	10	17	0	15	42
No. 15 Longhorns	14	14	3	10	41

=== At Texas Tech ===
	1	2	3	4	Total
No. 15 Longhorns	0	17	10	14	41
Red Raiders	7	3	0	24	34

=== Iowa State ===
	1	2	3	4	Total
No. 16 Cyclones	3	0	0	7	10
No. 15 Longhorns	7	10	7	0	24

=== At Kansas ===
	1	2	3	4	Total
No. 15 Longhorns	7	0	14	3	24
Jayhawks	0	0	0	17	17

=== vs Oklahoma (2018 Big 12 Championship) ===
	1	2	3	4	Total
No. 15 Longhorns	7	7	13	0	27
No. 4 Sooners	3	17	7	12	39

=== vs Georgia (2019 Sugar Bowl) ===
	1	2	3	4	Total
No. 15 Longhorns	10	10	0	8	28
No. 5 Bulldogs	0	7	0	14	21

== Rankings ==
Ranking movements Legend: ██ Increase in ranking ██ Decrease in ranking — = Not ranked RV = Received votes
	Week															
Poll	Pre	1	2	3	4	5	6	7	8	9	10	11	12	13	14	Final
AP	23	—	—	RV	18	19	9	7	6	15	15	13	11	9	14	9
Coaches	21	—	RV	RV	22	20	14	8	7	15	19	14	11	9	14	9
CFP	Not released									17	19	15	14	14	15	Not released

== Players drafted into the NFL ==
Round	Pick	Player	Position	NFL club
5	161	Charles Omenihu	DE	Houston Texans
7	217	Kris Boyd	CB	Minnesota Vikings
