= 2018 Kansas State Wildcats football team =

American college football season

2018 Kansas State Wildcats football
- Conference: Big 12 Conference
- Record: 5–7 (3–6 Big 12)
- Head coach: Bill Snyder (27th season)
- Offensive coordinator: Andre Coleman (1st season)
- Co-offensive coordinator: Collin Klein (1st season)
- Offensive scheme: Multiple
- Defensive coordinator: Blake Seiler (1st season)
- Co-defensive coordinator: Brian Norwood (1st season)
- Base defense: 4–3
- Home stadium: Bill Snyder Family Football Stadium

2018 Big 12 Conference football standings
	Conf.			Overall
Team	W		L	W		L
No. 4 Oklahoma y$^	8	–	1	12	–	2
No. 9 Texas y	7	–	2	10	–	4
Iowa State	6	–	3	8	–	5
No. 20 West Virginia	6	–	3	8	–	4
TCU	4	–	5	7	–	6
Baylor	4	–	5	7	–	6
Oklahoma State	3	–	6	7	–	6
Kansas State	3	–	6	5	–	7
Texas Tech	3	–	6	5	–	7
Kansas	1	–	8	3	–	9
Championship: Oklahoma 39, Texas 27
^ – College Football Playoff participant; $ – Conference champion; y – Championship game participant; Rankings from AP Poll

The 2018 Kansas State Wildcats football team represented Kansas State University in the 2018 NCAA Division I FBS football season. The Wildcats played their home games at the Bill Snyder Family Football Stadium in Manhattan, Kansas, and competed in the Big 12 Conference. They were led by head coach Bill Snyder in his 10th season of his current tenure at Kansas State and 27th overall. They finished the season 5–7 overall, 3–6 in Big 12 play to finish in a three-way tie for seventh place.

On December 2, Snyder, who had signed a five-year extension before the season began, announced his retirement. His final record was 215–117–1 in 27 seasons. On December 10, North Dakota State head coach Chris Klieman was hired as Snyder's successor.

== Previous season ==
The Wildcats finished the 2017 season 8–5, 5–4 in Big 12 play to finish in a four-way tie for fourth place. They were invited to the Cactus Bowl where they defeated UCLA.

== Preseason ==
On December 6, 2017, it was announced that offensive coordinator Dana Dimel was hired as the new head coach for UTEP. Coach Dimel fulfilled his final OC duties for KSU while participating in the Cactus Bowl before moving to his new job. His son Winston Dimel also transferred to UTEP after three seasons at Kansas State.

=== Award watch lists ===
Listed in the order that they were released

Award	Player	Position	Year
Lott Trophy	Denzel Goolsby	DB	JR
Rimington Trophy	Adam Holtorf	C	JR
Maxwell Award	Alex Barnes	RB	JR
Doak Walker Award	Alex Barnes	RB	JR
Bronko Nagurski Trophy	Duke Shelley	DB	SR
Outland Trophy	Dalton Risner	OL	SR
Wuerffel Trophy	Dalton Risner	OL	SR
Ted Hendricks Award	Reggie Walker	DE	JR

=== Big 12 media poll ===
The Big 12 media poll was released on July 12, 2018, with the Wildcats predicted to finish in sixth place.

Media poll
Predicted finish	Team	Votes (1st place)
1	Oklahoma	509 (46)
2	West Virginia	432 (2)
3	TCU	390 (1)
4	Texas	370 (1)
5	Oklahoma State	300
6	Kansas State	283 (2)
7	Iowa State	250
8	Texas Tech	149
9	Baylor	125
10	Kansas	52

=== Recruiting ===
The following is a list of the recruits that are on the 2018 roster.

College recruiting (2018)
Name	Hometown	School	Height	Weight	40^{‡}	Commit date
Christian Duffie; OG	Houston, TX	Summer Creek High School	6 ft 3 in (1.91 m)	300 lb (140 kg)		Jul 25, 2017
Christian Duffie; OG	Recruit ratings: Scout: Rivals: (77)					
Spencer Trussell; DE	Arlington, TX	James Martin High School	6 ft 3 in (1.91 m)	215 lb (98 kg)	5.01	Jul 24, 2017
Spencer Trussell; DE	Recruit ratings: Scout: Rivals: (77)					
Cartez Crook-Jones; DE	Grandview, MO	Grandview Senior High School	6 ft 4 in (1.93 m)	229 lb (104 kg)		Dec 10, 2017
Cartez Crook-Jones; DE	Recruit ratings: Scout: Rivals: (76)					
Aidan Mills; OT	Newton, KS	Newton High School	6 ft 5 in (1.96 m)	265 lb (120 kg)		
Aidan Mills; OT	Recruit ratings: Scout: Rivals: (76)					
Rahsaan York; OLB	Sacramento, CA	American River College (JC)	6 ft 0 in (1.83 m)	215 lb (98 kg)		Jan 28, 2018
Rahsaan York; OLB	Recruit ratings: Scout: Rivals: (76)					
E.J.Turner; WR	Cartersville, GA	Cartersville High School	6 ft 2 in (1.88 m)	179 lb (81 kg)	4.86	Dec 19, 2017
E.J.Turner; WR	Recruit ratings: Scout: Rivals: (76)					
Wayne Jones III; S	Owasso, OK	Owasso High School	5 ft 11 in (1.80 m)	193 lb (88 kg)	4.73	May 30, 2017
Wayne Jones III; S	Recruit ratings: Scout: Rivals: (76)					
Lance Robinson; S	New Orleans, LA	De La Salle High School	5 ft 10 in (1.78 m)	175 lb (79 kg)	4.62	Jun 10, 2017
Lance Robinson; S	Recruit ratings: Scout: Rivals: (75)					
JaQuavius Lane; WR	Loganville, GA	Grayson High School	5 ft 10 in (1.78 m)	167 lb (76 kg)		Aug 21, 2017
JaQuavius Lane; WR	Recruit ratings: Scout: Rivals: (74)					
Samuel Wheeler; QB (Dual Threat)	Lanexa, KS	St. James Academy	6 ft 4 in (1.93 m)	200 lb (91 kg)		
Samuel Wheeler; QB (Dual Threat)	Recruit ratings: Scout: Rivals: (74)					
Kevion McGee; CB	Miami, OK	Northeastern Oklahoma A&M (JC)	5 ft 10 in (1.78 m)	185 lb (84 kg)		Dec 20, 2017
Kevion McGee; CB	Recruit ratings: Scout: Rivals: (74)					
Jaylen Pickle; DT	Cimarron, KS	Cimarron High School	6 ft 4 in (1.93 m)	260 lb (120 kg)		Jun 7, 2017
Jaylen Pickle; DT	Recruit ratings: Scout: Rivals: (74)					
John Holcombe; QB (Dual Threat)	Houston, TX	Summer Creek High School	6 ft 4 in (1.93 m)	238 lb (108 kg)	5.11	Aug 19, 2017
John Holcombe; QB (Dual Threat)	Recruit ratings: Scout: Rivals: (73)					
Derrick Newton; DT	Douglas, GA	Coffee High School	6 ft 2 in (1.88 m)	268 lb (122 kg)		Dec 20, 2017
Derrick Newton; DT	Recruit ratings: Scout: Rivals: (73)					
Darreyl Patyerson; CB	Lawton, OK	Northeastern Oklahoma A&M (JC)	6 ft 0 in (1.83 m)	180 lb (82 kg)		Oct 11, 2017
Darreyl Patyerson; CB	Recruit ratings: Scout: Rivals: (73)					
E.J. Thomas; CB	Atlanta, GA	Carver High School	6 ft 0 in (1.83 m)	170 lb (77 kg)		Jul 24, 2017
E.J. Thomas; CB	Recruit ratings: Scout: Rivals: (73)					
Malik Knowles; WR	Mansfield, TX	Lake Ridge High School	6 ft 2 in (1.88 m)	175 lb (79 kg)		Jan 28, 2018
Malik Knowles; WR	Recruit ratings: Scout: Rivals: (73)					
Shane Cherry; OT	Hillsboro, MO	Grandview High School	6 ft 3 in (1.91 m)	300 lb (140 kg)		Dec 10, 2017
Shane Cherry; OT	Recruit ratings: Scout: Rivals: (72)					
Ekow Boye-Doe; ATH	Lawrence, KS	Lawrence High School	6 ft 0 in (1.83 m)	170 lb (77 kg)		Oct 30, 2017
Ekow Boye-Doe; ATH	Recruit ratings: Scout: Rivals: (72)					
Kaitori Leveston; OT	Waco, TX	Midway High School	6 ft 5 in (1.96 m)	290 lb (130 kg)		Sep 5, 2017
Kaitori Leveston; OT	Recruit ratings: Scout: Rivals: (72)					
Levi Archer; QB (Pocket Passer)	Goodland, KS	Goodland High School	6 ft 4 in (1.93 m)	185 lb (84 kg)		Jan 28, 2028
Levi Archer; QB (Pocket Passer)	Recruit ratings: Scout: Rivals: (NR)					
Tyquilo Moore; DT	El Dorado, KS		6 ft 4 in (1.93 m)	295 lb (134 kg)		
Tyquilo Moore; DT	Recruit ratings: Scout: Rivals: (NR)					
Luke Sowa; FB	Storrs, CT	UConn	6 ft 3 in (1.91 m)	245 lb (111 kg)		Dec 20, 2017
Luke Sowa; FB	Recruit ratings: Scout: Rivals: (NR)					
Hunter Rison; WR	East Lansing, MI	Michigan State	5 ft 11 in (1.80 m)	197 lb (89 kg)		
Hunter Rison; WR	Recruit ratings: Scout: Rivals: (NR)					
Overall recruit ranking:
Note: In many cases, Scout, Rivals, 247Sports, On3, and ESPN may conflict in their listings of height and weight.; In these cases, the average was taken. ESPN grades are on a 100-point scale.; Sources: "2018 Kansas State Football Commits". Rivals.; "2018 Team Ranking". Rivals.com.

== Schedule ==
The Wildcats hosted three non-conference opponents; South Dakota from the Missouri Valley Football Conference, Mississippi State from the Southeastern Conference, and UTSA from Conference USA.

Kansas State announced its 2018 football schedule on October 26, 2017. The 2018 schedule consisted of seven home and five away games in the regular season. The Wildcats hosted Big 12 foes Texas, Oklahoma State, Kansas, and Texas Tech and traveled to West Virginia, Baylor, Oklahoma, TCU, and Iowa State.

Date	Time	Opponent	Site	TV	Result	Attendance
September 1	6:00 p.m.	South Dakota*	Bill Snyder Family Football Stadium; Manhattan, KS	ESPN3	W 27–24	50,063
September 8	11:00 a.m.	No. 18 Mississippi State*	Bill Snyder Family Football Stadium; Manhattan, KS	ESPN	L 10–31	49,784
September 15	3:00 p.m.	UTSA*	Bill Snyder Family Football Stadium; Manhattan, KS	FSN	W 41–17	50,618
September 22	2:30 p.m.	at No. 12 West Virginia	Mountaineer Field at Milan Puskar Stadium; Morgantown, WV	ESPN	L 6–35	59,245
September 29	2:30 p.m.	No. 18 Texas	Bill Snyder Family Football Stadium; Manhattan, KS	FS1	L 14–19	49,916
October 6	2:30 p.m.	at Baylor	McLane Stadium; Waco, TX	FS1	L 34–37	36,888
October 13	11:00 a.m.	Oklahoma State^{†}	Bill Snyder Family Football Stadium; Manhattan, KS	ESPNU	W 31–12	50,245
October 27	2:30 p.m.	at No. 8 Oklahoma	Gaylord Family Oklahoma Memorial Stadium; Norman, OK	FOX	L 14–51	86,435
November 3	2:30 p.m.	at TCU	Amon G. Carter Stadium; Fort Worth, TX	FS1	L 13–14	40,486
November 10	11:00 a.m.	Kansas	Bill Snyder Family Football Stadium; Manhattan, KS (rivalry)	FSN	W 21–17	50,062
November 17	2:30 p.m.	Texas Tech	Bill Snyder Family Football Stadium; Manhattan, KS	ESPNU	W 21–6	47,287
November 24	6:00 p.m.	at No. 25 Iowa State	Jack Trice Stadium; Ames, IA (rivalry)	FS1	L 38–42	54,430
*Non-conference game; ^{†}Homecoming; Rankings from AP Poll released prior to the game; All times are in Central time

== Coaching staff ==
The following is a list of coaches at Kansas State for the 2018 season.

Name	Position	Seasons at Kansas State	Alma mater
Bill Snyder	Head coach	27 (10th consecutive)	William Jewell (1963)
Sean Snyder	Director Of Football Operations/Associate head coach/special teams coordinator	25 (overall); (22nd as Director Of Football Operations); (8th as Associate HC)	Kansas State (1994)
Andre Coleman	Passing game coordinator/wide receivers	6 (overall and WR Coach); (1st as OC)	Kansas State (1993)
Charlie Dickey	Co.-OC/offensive line	10 (overall); (10th as OL Coach); (1st as Co.-OC)	Arizona (1984)
Collin Klein	Co.-OC/quarterbacks	4 (2nd consecutive); (2nd as QB Coach); (1st as Co.-OC)	Kansas State (2012)
Zach Hanson	Tight ends	6 (1st consecutive)	Kansas State (2011)
Eric Hickson	Running backs	1	Kansas State (1998)
Blake Seiler	Defensive coordinator/linebackers	10 (2nd as LB Coach); (1st as DC)	Kansas State (2006)
Brian Norwood	Co.-DC/secondary	1 (overall); (1st as Co.-DC); (1st as Secondary Coach)	Hawaii (1988)
Mo Latimore	Interior Defensive Line	35 (25th consecutive); (25th as Interior DL Coach)	Kansas State (1971)
Jon Fabris	Defensive ends	4 (2nd consecutive)	Ole Miss (1980)
Owen Jordan	Offensive GA	3	Lincoln (2015)
Stanton Weber	Offensive GA	2	Kansas State (2015)
Jake Vang	Defensive GA	6	Kansas State University (2017)
Travis Britz	Defensive GA	2	Kansas State (2015)
Chris Dawson	Director Of Strength and Conditioning	8	Oklahoma (1994)
Taylor Braet	Director Of Football Operations/ Special Teams Quality Control	12 (overall); (7th as Special Teams QC); (5th as Dir. Of Football Operations)	Butler (2005)
Kacey Harper	Associate Director Of Football Operations	13 (10th Full Time)	Kansas State University (2008)
Kelli Krier	Assistant Director Of Recruiting	4	Kansas State University (2009)
Taylor Godinet	Assistant Director Of Recruiting/ Defensive Quality Control	4	Kansas State (2014)
Drew Liddle	Assistant Director Of Recruiting/offensive Quality Control	3 (1st as Ass. Director Of Recruiting); (1st as Offensive QC)	Kansas State (2014)
Matt Thomason	Director Of Sports Medicine/Head Trainer	16 (13th as Director Of Sports Medicine)	Texas Tech University (2001)
Scott Eilert	Director Of Video Services (Football)	26	Kansas State University (1991)
Al Cerbe	Head Football Equipment Manager	11 (7th as Equipment Manager)	Kansas State University (2010)

== Roster ==
Names in bold means player sits out due to NCAA transfer rules. Names in italics means player is a transfer. ESPN roster for the 2018 season.

2018 roster
**Quarterbacks**: 00 Levi Archer – Fr.; 3 John Holcombe II – Fr.; 5 Alex Delton – (redshirt) Jr.; 10 Skylar Thompson – (redshirt) So.; 14 Hunter Hall – (redshirt) Jr.; 17 Nick Ast – (redshirt) Fr.; 19 Samuel Wheeler – Fr.; **Running backs**: 3 Dalvin Warmack – (redshirt) Sr.; 23 Mike McCoy – (redshirt) So.; 24 Dylan Wentzel – (redshirt) Fr.; 25 Terrance Richards – (redshirt) Jr.; 32 Justin Silmon – (redshirt) Sr.; 34 Alex Barnes – (redshirt) Jr.; 35 Cornelius Ruff IV – (redshirt) Fr.; **Full backs**: 36 Mason Barta – (redshirt) Fr.; 47 **Luke Sowa** – (redshirt) Jr.; 80 Adam Harter – (redshirt) Jr.; **Wide receivers**: 2 Isaiah Harris – (redshirt) So.; 4 JaQuay Lane – Fr.; 6 D.J. Render – (redshirt) So.; 7 Isaiah Zuber – (redshirt) Jr.; 8 Ryan Henington – (redshirt) Fr.; 9 **Hunter Rison** – So.; 12 Landry Weber – (redshirt) Fr.; 13 Chabastin Taylor – (redshirt) Fr.; 15 Zach Reuter – Sr.; 16 E.J. Turner – Fr.; 18 Eric Hommel – (redshirt) Fr.; 19 Colby Moore – (redshirt) Sr.; 81 Malik Knowles – Fr.; 83 Dalton Schoen – (redshirt) Jr.; **Tight ends**: 28 Spencer Misko – (redshirt) Fr.; 84 Matt Jones – (redshirt) Sr.; 85 Logan Long – (redshirt) Fr.; 86 Trace Kochevar – (redshirt) Fr.; 87 Nick Lenners – (redshirt) So.; 89 Blaise Gammon – (redshirt) Jr.	**Offensive line**: 00 Shane Cherry – Fr.; 54 Hayden Perry – (redshirt) Jr.; 61 Abdul Beecham – Sr.; 62 Tyler Mitchell – (redshirt) Jr.; 63 Ben Adler – (redshirt) Fr.; 65 Harrison Creed – (redshirt) Fr.; 66 Aidan Mills – Fr.; 68 Bill Kuduk – (redshirt) Fr.; 70 Jake Helton – (redshirt) Fr.; 70 Kaitori Leveston – Fr.; 71 Dalton Risner – (redshirt) Sr.; 72 Evan Curl – (redshirt) Jr.; 73 Christian Duffie – Fr.; 74 Scott Frantz – (redshirt) Jr.; 75 Dylan Couch – (redshirt) So.; 76 Joshua Rivas – (redshirt) Fr.; 77 Nick Kaltmayer – (redshirt) Jr.; 79 Adam Holtorf – (redshirt) Jr.; **Defensive line**: 40 Spencer Trussell – Fr.; 42 Osvelt Joseph – Sr.; 44 Kyle Ball – Jr.; 48 Ian Nordell – (redshirt) Fr.; 50 Jordon Roberston – (redshirt) So.; 51 Reggie Walker – (redshirt) Jr.; 52 Anthony Payne – (redshirt) Fr.; 59 Drew Wiley – So.; 79 Tyquilo Moore – (redshirt) So.; 81 Wyatt Hubert – (redshirt) Fr.; 88 Cartez Crook-Jones – Fr.; 90 Bronson Massie – (redshirt) So.; 92 Eli Huggins – (redshirt) Fr.; 93 Jaylen Pickle – Fr.; 95 Derick Newton – Fr.; 96 Joe Davies – Jr.; 97 Logan Stoddard – Sr.; 99 Trey Dishon – (redshirt) Jr.	**Linebackers**: 00 Rahsaan York – Jr.; 3 Elijah Sullivan – Jr.; 5 Da'Quan Patton – (redshirt) Jr.; 10 Eric Gallon II – (redshirt) Jr.; 13 Chase Johnston – (redshirt) Jr.; 32 Justin Hughes – (redshirt) Jr.; 35 Blake Richmeier – (redshirt) Jr.; 41 Sam Sizelove – (redshirt) Sr.; 53 Jacob Jenkins – (redshirt) Fr.; 55 Ian Rudzik – (redshirt) So.; **Defensive backs**: 2 Lance Robinson – Fr.; 4 Wayne Jones III – Fr.; 4 Jordan Noil – Sr.; 6 Johnathan Durham – (redshirt) Jr.; 7 Elijah Walker – Sr.; 8 Duke Shelley – Sr.; 9 E.J. Thomas. – Fr.; 12 A. J. Parker – (redshirt) So.; 14 Kevion McGee – Jr.; 15 Walter Neil Jr. – (redshirt) So.; 17 Isaiah Stewart – (redshirt) Fr.; 18 Darreyl Patterson – (redshirt) Jr.; 20 Denzel Goolsby – (redshirt) Jr.; 21 Kendall Adams – (redshirt) Sr.; 24 Brock Monty – (redshirt) So.; 25 Ekow Boye-Doe – Fr.; 26 Daron Bowles – (redshirt) Jr.; 28 Ross Elder – (redshirt) Fr.; 31 Jahron McPherson – (redshirt) So.; **Punters**: 21 Devin Anctil – (redshirt) Jr.; 23 Bernardo Rodriguez – (redshirt) Fr.; **Kickers**: 10 Blake Lynch – (redshirt) So.; 18 Andrew Hicks – (redshirt) Fr.; 22 Nicholas McLellan – (redshirt) Jr.; **Place Kicker**: 91 Jake Roark – (redshirt) Fr.; **Long snappers**: 38 Dalton Harman – (redshirt) Sr.; 45 David Tullis – (redshirt) Sr.; 49 Wesley Burris – (redshirt) So.

Kansas State's 2018 football roster consists of 22 transfers. Luke Sowa (Butler CC via UConn), Adam Harter (Butler CC), Hunter Rison (Michigan State), Matt Jones (Butler CC), Hayden Perry (Hutchinson CC), Abdul Beecham (Blinn), Nick Kaltmayer (Western Illinois), Tyquilo Moore (Butler CC), Osvelt Joseph (Garden City CC), Joe Davies (Coffeyville CC), Logan Stoddard (Highland CC), Rahsaan York (American River College), Da'Quan Patton (Trinity Valley CC), Eric Gallon II (Virginia), Blake Richmeier (Butler CC), Darreyl Patterson (Northeastern Oklahoma A&M), Jordan Noil (Hutchinson CC), Elijah Walker (Cerritos CC), Kevion McGee (Northeastern Oklahoma A&M), Daron Bowles (Diablo Valley JC), Jahron McPherson (Butler CC), Devin Anctil (Coffeyville CC) and David Tullis (Butler CC).

== Game summaries ==
=== South Dakota ===
	1	2	3	4	Total
Coyotes	10	14	0	0	24
Wildcats	3	9	0	15	27

Kansas State's Isaiah Zuber was credited for saving the game with two key plays: an 85-yard punt return with South Dakota leading 24–12. Later in the game Zuber caught a touchdown pass from Skylar Thompson with 7:21 left to give K-State its first lead of the second half.

Kansas State scored all but seven of its points on field goals and special teams. Sophomore kicker Blake Lynch scored Kansas State's first 12 points on field goals of 22, 24, 38 and 44 yards. Kansas State racked up 13 penalties for 129 yards, but maintained more control of the ball with 37:39 of offense compared to South Dakota's 22:21. going over 100 years for the first time since 2016 against Florida Atlantic.

Among the penalties committed by Kansas State had significant impact on the game. An illegal block negated a punt-return touchdown by Duke Shelley; holding penalties erased first downs; and an Eli Walker interception was taken away by a pass-interference penalty and Walker was subsequently flagged for spiking the football.

South Dakota quarterback Austin Simmons threw for 257 yards and one touchdown, continually finding receiver Levi Falck (11 catches, 140 yards) open against top K-State cornerback Duke Shelley. The Coyotes led 24–12 at halftime. ESPN reported "... one solid takeaway is how well the Coyotes were in control for much of the game. They did a great job limiting the Kansas State offense for three quarters and had many Kansas State fans, players and coaches frustrated throughout the night."

=== Mississippi State ===
	1	2	3	4	Total
No. 18 Bulldogs	3	14	7	7	31
Wildcats	3	0	7	0	10

Mississippi State quarterback Nick Fitzgerald made his first appearance on the football fields since November 2017, when a foot injury sidelined him for the season and a 1-game suspension kept him out of the season opener. Fitzgerald threw for 154 yards with two touchdowns and ran for another 159 yards. Mississippi State compiled a total of 538 yards of total offense where Kansas State only managed 213.

Kansas State continued with its two-quarterback system, switching snaps between Skylar Thompson and Alex Delton. Kansas State running back Alex Barnes managed 75 yards rushing, but the Wildcats fell short to lose the game 31–10.

=== UTSA ===
	1	2	3	4	Total
Roadrunners	7	0	0	10	17
Wildcats	10	17	14	0	41

Kansas State achieved a "confidence builder" by pulling together with a victory over San Antonio. Sophomore Skylar Thompson shared quarterback duties again with Alex Delton, but made more of a statement for his role with the team by throwing for 216 yards and rushing for 66—producing two touchdowns by the air and a third on the ground. After losing the ball on a fumble, Delton entered the game and hit Isaiah Zuber for a 72-yard touchdown, placing the Wildcats well ahead by a score of 41–7. Kansas State scored in five of six possessions in the first half. The final score was Kansas State 41, San Antonion 17.

On defense, San Antonio gave up over 400 yards to Kansas State and dropped their record to 0–3, where Kansas State advanced to 2–1 for the season. San Antonio Coach Frank Wilson said, "Unfortunately we did not always execute to the fullest, but I think take away a couple of big-play opportunities, they weren't going methodically down the field and just shoving us around. We held them to some third-down opportunities, but we just couldn't get them off the field."

=== At West Virginia ===
	1	2	3	4	Total
Wildcats	0	0	3	3	6
No. 12 Mountaineers	7	14	14	0	35

West Virginia had originally planned to have a game the previous week against North Carolina State, but it was canceled due to Hurricane Florence. The team and coaches began preparations against Kansas State early. Mountaineer Coach Dana Holgorsen said, "Kansas State's a tough outfit that we've got to prepare for."

Both teams started conference play with this game. Kansas State entered the game with a record of 2–1 where West Virginia had already secured victories against Tennessee (40–14) and Youngstown State (523–-17)." This game is the ninth meeting between the two teams with the Wildcats holding a 5–3 overall lead. The teams have split the four games played at West Virginia.

West Virginia managed to take control of the game mid-way through the second quarter after Kansas State failed to convert on fourth down. West Virginia ended ahead at the half 21–0. Kansas State managed control the ball more on offense but it wasn't enough, as West Virginia achieved 464 total yards compared to Kansas State's 318. Although West Virginia had four turnovers to Kansas State's one, the Wildcats lost 69 yards on 8 penalties compared to the Mountaineer's 35 yards on 3 penalties. West Virginia was 8–12 on third down conversions compared to Kansas State's 3–14.

In the second half of play, Kansas State was successful with two field goals and additional scores by the Mountaineers put the game to a conclusion of West Virginia's victory 35–6.

=== Texas ===
	1	2	3	4	Total
No. 18 Longhorns	7	12	0	0	19
Wildcats	0	0	7	7	14

Texas lost their first game on the road at Maryland and then won their next three games at home, and their last two victories came against ranked teams—No. 22 Southern California and No. 17 TCU. But the travel games (especially in this series) have not been in the Longhorn's favor. The home team has won last six games between the two teams and Texas has not won in Manhattan since 2002.

Texas was the only team to score in the first half of play, with two touchdowns, a field goal, and a safety. Kansas State had a chance to score a touchdown on the final play of the first half when Alex Delton threw a pass to Adam Harter that was dropped in the end zone. The score at the half was Texas 19, Kansas State 0.

Kansas State fared better in the second half, holding Texas scoreless and replacing Alex Delton with Skylar Thompson. Thompson led Kansas State to score two touchdowns in the second half with 14 points. In the end, Texas held the lead with a final score of 19–14. For the next week Texas played Oklahoma after stopping the second-half comeback by Kansas State.

=== At Baylor ===
	1	2	3	4	Total
Wildcats	7	7	0	20	34
Bears	3	9	8	17	37

Baylor held a slight edge in the pregame analysis. Coming into the game Baylor was considered better than they were at this same time last year and has won 3 games (Kansas, Texas-San Antonio, and Abilene Christian), the Bears have also lost 2 (Duke, Oklahoma). In Baylor's previous game against Oklahoma, they achieved 493 yards of offense in their loss—something expected to be a challenge for Kansas State on defense.

The game started with Kansas State holding the lead at the end of the first and second quarters. Baylor pulled ahead in the third quarter but missed several field goals. Baylor's Charlie Brewer threw for 296 yards and Kansas State's Alex Barnes rushed for 250 yards (he ran for 129 yards and four touchdowns in the 2016 matchup also at Baylor).

Kansas State had its share of mistakes: K-State missed a field goal and an extra point and were also ineffective on kickoff returns. Kansas State also gave up a fumble on the kickoff return after a controversial play review to start the third quarter and Baylor scored a touchdown two plays later. Wildcat turnovers and penalties led to three touchdowns for Baylor. They also had problems with a punt return they recovered and an extra point was blocked.

Baylor's Connor Martin had a rough day as the kicker, missing three field goals and an extra point, yet among all that he ended up kicking the game-winning field goal from 29 yards with 8 seconds left in the game. The final score was a Baylor victory, 37–34.

=== Oklahoma State ===
	1	2	3	4	Total
Cowboys	3	3	0	6	12
Wildcats	0	3	14	14	31

The Oklahoma State Cowboys came in to the game after a loss the previous week to Iowa State by a score of 48–42, and that loss put extra pressure on the Cowboys to win coming into the game. Some of the issues the Cowboys brought in to the include lack of discipline, a disconnected defense, and a failure to force turnovers on defense. The 2018 loss to Iowa State had many similarities to the 2017 game between Oklahoma State and Kansas State that resulted in a K-State victory 45–40.

Those issues carried through into the game as Oklahoma State produced its worst offensive performance since 2014. The score at halftime put Oklahoma State ahead 6–3, but strong performance by the Wildcats in the second half helped take Kansas State to a victory 31–12. Kansas State's Skylar Thompson completed 11-of-22 passes for 130 yards and the offense achieved 291 yards on 55 carries.

=== At Oklahoma ===
	1	2	3	4	Total
Wildcats	0	7	0	7	14
No. 8 Sooners	17	17	14	3	51

Kansas State was able to take a week of rest between the previous win against Oklahoma State and their next game against Oklahoma. Oklahoma's new defensive coordinator Ruffin McNeill was able to simplify the defensive plan which helped turn out good results against Texas Christian in the previous week with a Sooner victory 52–27. K-State's Coach Snyder commented: "They're very much the same football team that they were on the defensive side of the ball, on both sides actually, but certainly on the defensive side. I saw some tweaks, a few things, that you might consider to be changes -- don't know if they're changes or are just there and hadn't surfaced previously. But by and large, it's the same defense."

When the game rolled around, both the offense and the defense for Oklahoma performed to control the game from start to finish, with a final score of 51–14 and an Oklahoma win.

=== At TCU ===
	1	2	3	4	Total
Wildcats	7	0	0	6	13
Horned Frogs	7	0	7	0	14

When the two Big 12 conference teams that both wear purple got together for the 2018 matchup, Kansas State lost quarterback Skylar Thompson to an injury in the first quarter and the Wildcats went to backup Alex Delton. Kansas State kept the game close but missed a PAT leaving the score 14–13 in favor of TCU. "Of course I feel horrible for him," Snyder said. "He's one of the young guys. He didn't lose the ballgame for us. There were a bunch of us that made mistakes that contributed." With the loss, K-State was left in a position to win the last three games in order to be eligible for post-season bowl games.

=== Kansas ===
	1	2	3	4	Total
Jayhawks	0	3	7	7	17
Wildcats	0	0	14	7	21

The Jayhawks outgained the Wildcats in total yardage 347–301, but it wasn't enough. A Kansas offensive drive began with 8:29 remaining began with four penalties on their first three snaps. A Holding Penalty reversed a 74-yard Khalil Herbert run and a false start on the next play added to the situation. On the third play of the drive, KU's Williams ran for 60 yards, but center Alex Fontana was penalized for holding. The fourth penalty happened when KU's tight end Mavin Saunders tried to hide the penalty flag, bringing a call for unsportsmanlike conduct. Kansas State ended up winning their tenth consecutive Sunflower Showdown by a score of 21–17.

=== Texas Tech ===
	1	2	3	4	Total
Red Raiders	6	0	0	0	6
Wildcats	0	10	5	6	21

The Red Raiders experienced their fourth consecutive loss when traveling to Manhattan. Tech was without starting quarterback Alan Bowman and offensive players Connor Killian and Mason Reed were also out. Tech ran the ball 26 times for 31 yards and has not had a ball carrier reach 65 yards iun the past seven games. Tech's 181 yards of total offense was the lowest output since 2010 against the Texas Longhorns.

Kansas State held a solid lead late in the fourth quarter and ran a tackle-eligible play to right tackle Dalton Risner. Although Risner took the ball to the end zone, officials reviewed the play and declared that it was a forward pass. The ruling resulted in a penalty for illegal touching and it took away the TD. K-State's Lynch then was successful on his final field goal.

Kansas State kicker Blake Lynch had not completed a successful field goal in a game for nearly two months, but managed to match a career-high with four straight and added an extra point. A blocked punt by Kansas State's Brock Monty added to K-State's success with a final victory of 21–6.

=== At Iowa State ===
	1	2	3	4	Total
Wildcats	0	21	10	7	38
Cyclones	7	7	7	21	42

In the week before the final regular season game for Kansas State, Iowa State jumped K-State in the standings, ranked 25th. The Cyclones come off a disappointing loss at Texas, but had won five of its past six. Kansas State seeks its sixth victory in the game with a chance to become bowl-eligible for its ninth consecutive season. Weather forecast for the night game at Jack Trice Stadium are for cold temperatures. “We have won two in a row and have a little momentum going,” K-State running back Alex Barnes said. “Iowa State is going to be a tough game. It’s going to be another cold game, too. It’s a night game. It’s all lined up for us to do pretty good. We just have to go out there and do it.”

Iowa State's loss at Texas Saturday brought an end to the Cyclones' hopes for a spot in the Big 12 Conference title game and they also fell in the College Football Playoff rankings from #16 to #25. K-State's Coach Snyder came into the game 22–4 all-time against Iowa State and 9–0 since his return in 2009. For this matchup, the pre-game consensus was that the Cyclones were favored by 14 points over the Wildcats.

After a slow start, Kansas State held a solid lead for most of the game. Kansas State had racked up a 17-point lead with only 12 minutes remaining in the game. From there, Iowa State's Mike Rose grabbed a loose ball and ran it in for a touchdown. The Cyclones controlled the game from that point to rally with 21 unanswered points. The final score was an Iowa State victory, 42–38.

== Rankings ==
Ranking movements Legend: ██ Increase in ranking ██ Decrease in ranking — = Not ranked RV = Received votes
	Week															
Poll	Pre	1	2	3	4	5	6	7	8	9	10	11	12	13	14	Final
AP	RV	RV	—	—	—	—	—	—	—	—	—	—	—	—	—	—
Coaches	RV	RV	—	—	—	—	—	—	—	—	—	—	—	—	—	—
CFP	Not released									—	—	—	—	—	—	Not released

== Players drafted into the NFL ==
Round	Pick	Player	Position	NFL Club
2	41	Dalton Risner	OT	Denver Broncos
6	206	Duke Shelley	CB	Chicago Bears
