= 2019 Sugar Bowl =

College football bowl game

2019 Allstate Sugar Bowl
- CFP New Year's Six; 85th Sugar Bowl
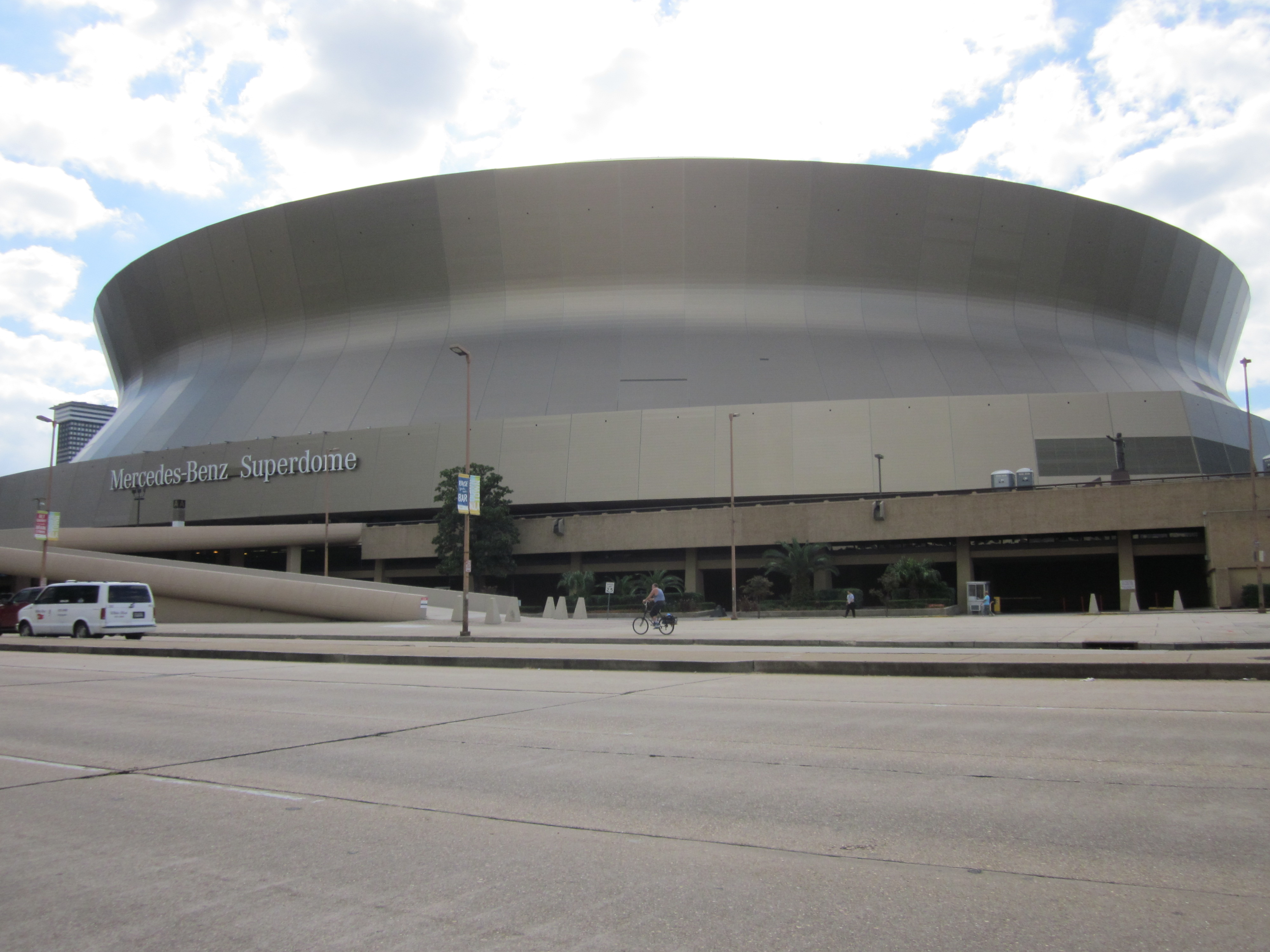
- The Mercedes-Benz Superdome in New Orleans, Louisiana, hosted the Sugar Bowl.
Texas Longhorns	Georgia Bulldogs
(9–4)	(11–2)
Big 12	SEC
28	21
Head coach: Tom Herman	Head coach: Kirby Smart
AP / Coaches / CFP; 14 / 14 / 15	AP / Coaches / CFP; 6 / 6 / 5
	1	2	3	4	Total
Texas	10	10	0	8	28
Georgia	0	7	0	14	21
- Date: January 1, 2019
- Season: 2018
- Stadium: Mercedes-Benz Superdome
- Location: New Orleans, Louisiana
- MVP: Sam Ehlinger (QB, Texas)
- Favorite: Georgia by 11
- National anthem: Robin Barnes
- Referee: Mike Mothershed (Pac-12)
- Attendance: 71,449
- Payout: US$40 million to each team

United States TV coverage
- Network: ESPN and ESPN Radio
- Announcers: ESPN: Sean McDonough (play-by-play); Todd Blackledge (analyst); Holly Rowe (sideline); ESPN Radio: Bill Rosinski, David Norrie, Ian Fitzsimmons
- Nielsen ratings: 7.3 (13.30 million viewers)

International TV coverage
- Network: ESPN Deportes
- Announcers: Roberto Abramowitz, Jerry Olaya

The 2019 Sugar Bowl was a college football bowl game played on January 1, 2019. It was the 85th edition of the Sugar Bowl, and one of the 2018–19 bowl games concluding the 2018 FBS football season. Sponsored by the Allstate insurance company, the game was officially known as the Allstate Sugar Bowl. About an hour before the game Texas live mascot, Bevo attacked Georgia's mascot, Uga.

== Teams ==
The Sugar Bowl matches the champions of the Big 12 Conference and Southeastern Conference (SEC), unless a champion team is selected for the College Football Playoff, in which case another team from the same conference is invited. Per that criterion, a matchup of Texas and Georgia was announced on December 2. The two programs had previously met four times, with Texas having won three times (including the 1949 Orange Bowl) and Georgia winning once (the 1984 Cotton Bowl Classic).

=== Texas Longhorns ===
Texas lost the 2018 Big 12 Championship Game to Oklahoma, then became the Big 12 representative in the Sugar Bowl when Oklahoma was selected for the College Football Playoff. Texas entered the bowl with a 9–4 record (7–2 in conference).

=== Georgia Bulldogs ===
Georgia lost the 2018 SEC Championship Game to Alabama, then became the SEC representative in the Sugar Bowl when Alabama was selected for the College Football Playoff. Georgia entered the bowl with an 11–2 record (7–1 in conference).

== Game summary ==
Texas defeated a heavily favored Georgia team, 28–21. Quarterback Sam Ehlinger was named the game MVP.

=== Scoring summary ===
Scoring summary

Quarter	Time	Drive			Team	Scoring information	Score	
Quarter	Time	Plays	Yards	TOP	Team	Scoring information	TEX	UGA
1	10:35	10	75	4:25	TEX	Sam Ehlinger 2-yard touchdown run, Cameron Dicker kick good	7	0
1	6:05	4	6	1:29	TEX	37-yard field goal by Cameron Dicker	10	0
2	14:53	3	12	0:59	TEX	Sam Ehlinger 9-yard touchdown run, Cameron Dicker kick good	17	0
2	9:03	12	75	5:50	UGA	Brian Herrien 17-yard touchdown reception from Jake Fromm, Rodrigo Blankenship kick good	17	7
2	4:37	11	62	4:26	TEX	30-yard field goal by Cameron Dicker	20	7
4	11:49	14	70	5:37	TEX	Sam Ehlinger 1-yard touchdown run, 2-point pass good	28	7
4	10:25	6	67	1:15	UGA	Mecole Hardman 3-yard touchdown reception from Jake Fromm, Rodrigo Blankenship kick good	28	14
4	0:14	5	72	0:56	UGA	D'Andre Swift 5-yard touchdown reception from Jake Fromm, Rodrigo Blankenship kick good	28	21
"TOP" = time of possession. For other American football terms, see Glossary of American football.							28	21

=== Statistics ===
	1	2	3	4	Total
No. 15 Longhorns	10	10	0	8	28
No. 5 Bulldogs	0	7	0	14	21

Statistics	TEX	UGA
First downs	20	20
Plays–yards	77–355	64–284
Rushes–yards	49–178	30–72
Passing yards	177	212
Passing: comp–att–int	20–28–0	20–34–1
Turnovers		
Time of possession	35:00	25:00

Team	Category	Player	Statistics
Texas	Passing	Sam Ehlinger	19/27, 169 yds
Texas	Rushing	Tre Watson	18 car, 91 yds
Texas	Receiving	Lil'Jordan Humphrey	7 rec, 67 yds
Georgia	Passing	Jake Fromm	20/34, 202 yds, 3 TD, 1 INT
Georgia	Rushing	Elijah Holyfield	12 car, 62 yds
Georgia	Receiving	Riley Ridley	5 rec, 61 yds
