= Collin Johnson =

American football player (born 1997)

No. 19, 15, 80, 17
- Position: Wide receiver

Personal information
- Born: September 23, 1997 (age 29); Los Angeles, California, U.S.
- Listed height: 6 ft 6 in (1.98 m)
- Listed weight: 220 lb (100 kg)

Career information
- High school: Valley Christian (San Jose, California)
- College: Texas (2016–2019)
- NFL draft: 2020: 5th round, 165th overall pick

Career history
- Jacksonville Jaguars (2020); New York Giants (2021–2022); Chicago Bears (2023–2024); Las Vegas Raiders (2025)*
- * Offseason or practice squad member only

Career NFL statistics
- Receptions: 31
- Receiving yards: 394
- Receiving touchdowns: 2
- Stats at Pro Football Reference

Collin Johnson (born September 23, 1997) is an American former professional football player who was a wide receiver in the National Football League (NFL). He played college football for the Texas Longhorns. He is the son of College Football Hall of Fame cornerback Johnnie Johnson and attended high school at Valley Christian in San Jose. As of 2020, Johnson was the tallest wide receiver in the NFL.

== Early life ==
Attending Valley Christian in San Jose, Johnson was limited by injury in both his sophomore and senior seasons but still eclipsed 1,100 yards as a senior. By the winter of his sophomore year, Johnson had garnered scholarship offers from USC, Arizona State, Utah, Rutgers, Cal, and TCU, but committed to Texas on April 17, 2014, along with his brother Kirk, a running back who is a year older than Collin.

== College career ==
Johnson played as a wide receiver for The University of Texas Longhorns. He played in every game as a freshman and started one. As a sophomore, he started nine games and completed the season with 54 catches.

Early in his junior season, Johnson hauled in a career-high 191 yards against USC, including 47 on a go-ahead touchdown. After underperforming against Oklahoma, Johnson was replaced atop the depth chart by Dorian Leonard. A year later, Johnson called the benching a learning opportunity and a chance for personal growth.

Heading into his senior year, coach Tom Herman noted that Johnson improved markedly in the offseason. Johnson also landed on the Walter Camp Award, Wuerffel Award, and Biletnikoff Award preseason watchlists.

Johnson's acrobatics and 124 yards against TCU in week four earned him National Player of the Week accolades. After a slight injury to his knee, Johnson missed the Nov 10 game against Texas Tech. In the 2018 Big 12 Championship Game, Johnson set the title game record for receiving yards with 177. The performance came after Johnson was excluded from the All-Big 12 team for 2018. His coaches also lauded him for increased blocking skills throughout the season.

== Professional career ==
Pre-draft measurables
Height	Weight	Arm length	Hand span	Wingspan	Bench press
6 ft 5 5/8 in (1.97 m)	222 lb (101 kg)	31 3/4 in (0.81 m)	9 in (0.23 m)	6 ft 6 1/2 in (1.99 m)	17 reps
All values from NFL Combine

=== Jacksonville Jaguars ===
Johnson was selected by the Jacksonville Jaguars in the fifth round with the 165th overall pick in the 2020 NFL draft. The Jaguars received the 165th pick used to select Johnson as a result from a trade that sent Dante Fowler to the Los Angeles Rams.

In Week 5 against the Houston Texans, Johnson recorded three catches for 30 yards and his first career touchdown reception during the 30–14 loss. In Week 11 against the Cleveland Browns, Johnson recorded four catches for 96 yards and a touchdown during the 27–25 loss. Jaguars quarterback Mike Glennon threw a 46-yard pass that Johnson ran in for his second touchdown of the year. On January 2, 2021, Johnson was placed on injured reserve.

On August 31, 2021, Johnson was waived by the Jaguars.

=== New York Giants ===
On September 1, 2021, Johnson was claimed off waivers by the New York Giants. On August 24, 2022, Johnson was placed on injured reserve with a torn Achilles tendon.

Johnson was released by the Giants on August 27, 2023, as a part of the team's final roster cuts.

=== Chicago Bears ===
On October 10, 2023, Johnson was signed to the practice squad of the Chicago Bears. He was signed to the active roster on January 3, 2024.

Johnson was waived by the Bears on August 27, 2024 and re-signed to the practice squad. He was promoted to the active roster on November 20. Johnson played in nine games for Chicago, recording one reception for six yards and five tackles.

=== Las Vegas Raiders ===
On May 1, 2025, Johnson signed with the Las Vegas Raiders. He was released by the Raiders on August 25.

== NFL career statistics ==
Year	Team	Games		Receiving					Fumbles	
Year	Team	GP	GS	Rec	Yds	Avg	Lng	TD	Fum	Lost
2020	JAX	14	0	18	272	15.1	46	2	0	0
2021	NYG	12	1	11	105	9.5	16	0	0	0
2022	NYG	0	0	Did not play due to injury						
2023	CHI	3	0	1	11	11.0	11	0	0	0
2024	CHI	9	0	1	6	6.0	6	0	0	0

== Post-playing career ==
On May 21, 2026, Johnson announced his retirement from football to attend the MIT Sloan School of Management.

== Personal life ==
Johnson's father Johnnie also played at Texas and played for ten years in the NFL; he was inducted into the College Football Hall of Fame in 2007. Collin's older brother Kirk was also a football player at Texas (2015–19), and his sister Camille was a member of the track and field team where she threw the javelin (2018–19). On June 26, 2020, Collin proposed to his girlfriend since high school, Sara Machado.
