= Red River Rivalry =

American college football rivalry between Texas and Oklahoma

Red River Shootout

- Oklahoma Sooners Texas Longhorns
- Sport: Football
- First meeting: October 10, 1900; Texas 28, Oklahoma 2
- Latest meeting: October 10, 2026; Oklahoma 27, Texas 24
- Next meeting: October 9, 2027
- Broadcasters: ABC/ESPN
- Stadiums: Cotton Bowl (Dallas)
- Trophy: Golden Hat

Statistics
- Total meetings: 122
- All-time series: Texas leads: 65–52–5 (.553)
- Largest victory: Oklahoma: 65–13 (2003); Texas: 49–0 (2022)
- Longest win streak: Texas: 8 (1940–1947, 1958–1965)
- Current win streak: Oklahoma: 1 (2026–present)

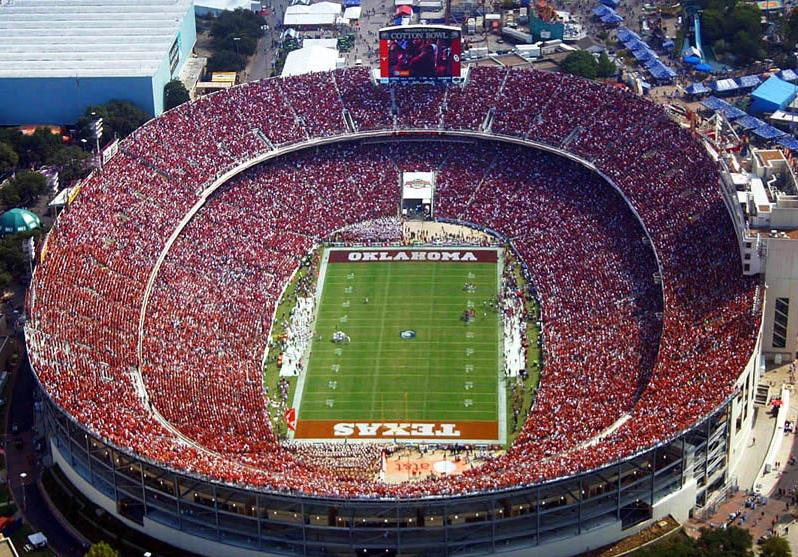
Cotton Bowl packed in 2010 for Red River Rivalry game

The Oklahoma–Texas football rivalry is a college football rivalry game between border rivals Texas and Oklahoma. The two teams first played each other in 1900, and the rivalry has been renewed annually since 1929 for a total of 122 games as of 2026. The rivalry is commonly referred to as the Red River Shootout, the Red River Rivalry, or the Red River Showdown. The name refers to the Red River, which forms part of the border between Oklahoma and Texas.

Since 1934, the game has been played on the second Saturday of October, though it has occasionally been played on the first Saturday. Since 1932, the game's site has been the Cotton Bowl inside Fair Park in Dallas. The winner of the regular-season matchup receives the Golden Hat trophy, a gold ten-gallon hat once made of bronze. The trophy is kept by the winning school's athletic department until the next game.

== Overview ==
The first game in the series was played in 1900, when Oklahoma was still a territory. The game was called the Red River Shootout until the 100th game in 2005, when, sponsored by SBC Communications, the game was officially renamed the SBC Red River Rivalry. "Shootout" was replaced so as not to convey an attitude of condoning gun violence. The following year, with SBC's purchase of AT&T Corporation, the game was renamed the AT&T Red River Rivalry. It was renamed again in 2014 to the AT&T Red River Showdown, before Allstate secured naming rights in 2023, and changed the name to the Allstate Red River Rivalry. The terms Red River Shootout and Red River Showdown are also applied to meetings between the two schools in all other sports.

Since 1936, the first year of the AP poll, at least one of the teams has come into the game ranked on 70 occasions. Texas leads the overall series 65–52–5 (.553).

Texas and Oklahoma have combined for 11 claimed national championships, and in each instance the national champion won the Oklahoma–Texas game; the losing team in this rivalry game has never gone on to win a national title.

In 2005, The Dallas Morning News asked the 119 Division 1A football coaches to identify the top rivalry game in college football. The Red River Rivalry ranked third, behind only Michigan–Ohio State and Army–Navy.

== History ==
=== 1900–1960 ===
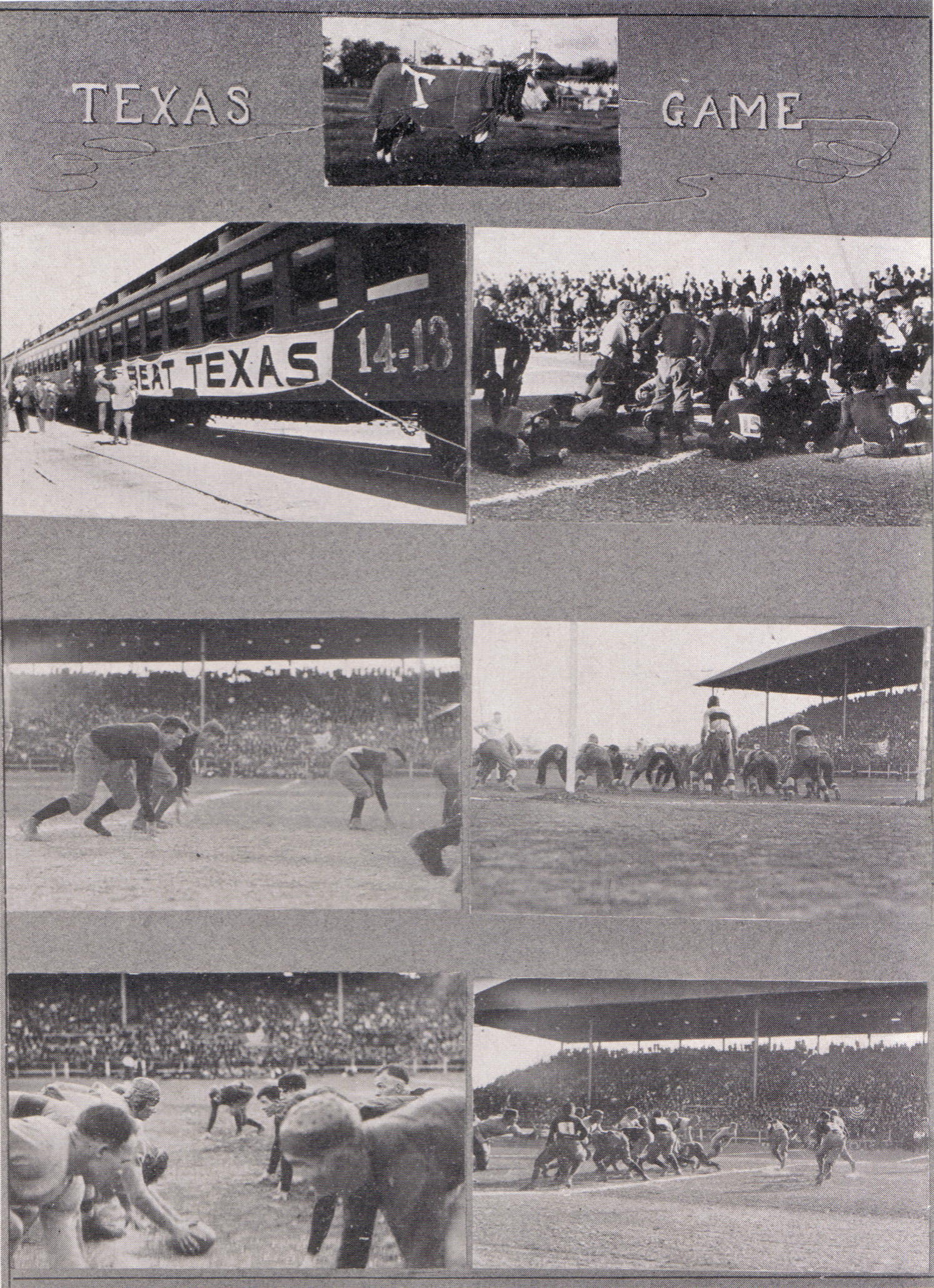
A page from the 1916 OU Yearbook depicts the 1915 game.

The first meeting between the Oklahoma and Texas football teams occurred in 1900, before either team had acquired their current nicknames. At the time, the Texas team was typically called "Varsity". The write-up in the Austin American-Statesman article referred to the game as a "practice game". The paper reported:

The game of football yesterday afternoon at the Varsity athletic field was an interesting contrast, notwithstanding the rather one-sided score of 28–2 in favor of the Varsity.

In the 1950 rivalry game, Billy Vessels scored on an 11-yard run late in the contest, and Texas native Jim Weatherall kicked the extra point to give Oklahoma a narrow 14–13 win.

In 1958, Texas defeated Oklahoma by one point, breaking the University of Oklahoma's series dominance of the 1950s. Texas Longhorns head coach Darrell Royal had 10 years earlier been the quarterback for the Oklahoma Sooners, and defeated his former coach and mentor Bud Wilkinson in the game. Wilkinson would lose to Texas the next five years before retiring in 1963.

=== 1960–1995 ===
The 1963 game featured No. 1 Oklahoma versus No. 2 Texas, the seventh regular-season No. 1 versus No. 2 game (eighth, overall) in the history of the AP poll. Texas won the game, took the No. 1 ranking, and kept it for the rest of the season, winning its first national championship.

Prior to the 1970 meeting, Oklahoma changed its offense to the Wishbone formation following a home loss to Oregon State (the Sooners had an open week between the games versus the Beavers and Longhorns). The offense was invented by Texas offensive coordinator Emory Bellard two years earlier and used by the Longhorns to win 23 consecutive games and the 1969 national championship to that point.

Texas routed Oklahoma 41–9 in 1970 and extended their winning streak to 30 before losing to Notre Dame 24–11 in the Cotton Bowl. Meanwhile, as the Sooners mastered the Wishbone, they went 6–1–1 to close 1970 and opened 1971 with three consecutive victories before facing the Longhorns.

Oklahoma showed just how far they had come in one season, shredding Texas for 435 yards rushing in a 48–27 victory. The Sooners finished 1971 averaging 472 yards rushing per game, an 11–1 record and a No. 2 final ranking, with only a 35–31 loss to Nebraska in the "Game of the Century" keeping Chuck Fairbanks' squad from the national championship.

In 1972, Oklahoma spied on Texas' practices, allowing them to block a quick kick the Longhorns had secretly been working on en route to a victory.

In an article referencing the 1976 rivalry game, Texas coach Darrell Royal accused Oklahoma coach Barry Switzer of spying on their practice before the matchup. Before the game, current president at the time, Gerald Ford, was with the two coaches. There was little conversation between the two. The game finished in a 6-6 tie in what would be Royal's last Red River Rivalry game.

Going into the matchup from the 1977 season, Oklahoma had beaten Texas five years in a row. The Longhorns were also down their starting quarterback, Mark McBath for this game. They then had to pivot to the backup, Jon Aune. Nine plays after he got in the game, however, Aune also got injured and was taken out. Texas had to pivot once more to their third string quarterback, Randy McEachern. The Longhorn's Heisman running back, Earl Campbell, was also very involved in this matchup. Campbell ran for 124 yards, and his 24-yard touchdown run broke the 3-3 tie, a key play in the game. Texas kicker, Russel Erxleben, impacted the game as well; drilling a 58 and a 64 yard field goal. With four minutes left in the fourth quarter, Oklahoma had the ball on the five-yard line and on 4th and 1, Oklahoma quarterback Thomas Lott was stopped by Longhorn Brad Shearer. Texas would go on to hold their lead of 13-6 to the final whistle. After the game, Texas moved to the #2 ranked team, taking the Sooners place as the second best team in the country.

In a rain-soaked 1984 game, Texas entered the game ranked No. 1, Oklahoma No. 3 (No. 2 in some polls). The matchup in 1984 was a rainy game. It was a "relentless downpour", as put by Texas' All-American kicker, Jeff Ward, in an interview. Switzer wore a ballcap during the game that read "Beat Texas." This game also marked the only time that future University of Texas at Austin head coach Mack Brown participated in the Red River Shootout not as a Texas Longhorn, but as Oklahoma's offensive coordinator. Oklahoma had a 15-10 lead at the end of the 3rd quarter. With two minutes remaining in the game, Oklahoma Coach Barry Switzer called a play in which OU intentionally snapped the ball out of the back of the end zone, rather than punting the ball downfield, resulting in a safety and 2 points for the Longhorns. Now only being down 3, Texas received the free kick after the safety and drove down the field into scoring position. Texas quarterback Todd Doge aired it out to the end zone, and the pass appeared to be intercepted by OU defensive back Keith Stansberry. Officials, however, ruled him out of bounds. The Longhorns were then able to capitalize with a 32 yard field goal from Ward to tie the game at 15. Since overtime wasn't fully adopted until the 1996 season, the game finished in a 15-15 tie.

In the 1994 game, after the pregame prayer in the Texas locker room, coach John Mackovic informed the team that backup quarterback James Brown would be starting the game in place of the injured Shea Morenz (who had strained knee ligaments that limited him in practice ahead of the game). Texas was up 17-10, as a result of a 9-yard rushing touchdown by Brown in the third quarter. Oklahoma had the ball with 43 seconds remaining in the game. It was on 4th down and goal that sophomore tailback James Allen carried the ball down to the goal line. He made his way around the outside of the Texas defensive line when junior defensive lineman Stonie Clark stopped him just after the one yard line. Texas would go on to win the game 17-10, for one of their seven wins over Oklahoma in the 1990s. Brown finished with a stat line consisting of 148 passing yards with a passing and rushing touchdown.

=== 1996–2001 ===
The first Big 12 Conference overtime game, the 1996 meeting featured a John Blake squad under the direction of freshman quarterback Justin Fuente. The game ended Oklahoma 30–Texas 27 after a come from behind victory in the final seven minutes. Down 24–13, Jarrail Jackson returned a punt 51 yards for a touchdown, then Fuente completed a 2-point conversion pass to Stephen Alexander to cut the lead to just 3. The Sooners forced the Longhorns to punt, and drove to the Texas 28. Jeremy Alexander kicked a 44-yard field goal to tie the game at 24 each. In overtime, Texas was forced to settle for a 43-yard Phil Dawson field goal, after losing 1 yard on three plays. Lining up at the Texas 25, James Allen broke a ten-yard run, carried for two and three yards, then caught an 8-yard screen pass from Fuente on 3rd and 5 from the 10. On the ensuing play, Allen took a pitch from Fuente for two yards into the end zone for a touchdown to win the Sooners the game, doing what he was unable to do in the 1994 matchup two years prior.

The 2000 game was marked by rain and 49-degree weather, but it ended up being noted for the most lopsided margin of victory in the history of the match-up at that time, though Oklahoma would top its feat just three years later. Oklahoma came into the game ranked 10th, with Texas ranked 11th. This was the highest combined rankings of the teams since 1984. The Sooners got up to a 42-point lead before Texas scored, finally winning the game 63–14. OU also held Texas to minus-7 yards rushing, an all-time regular-season low for the Longhorns.

Longhorn coach Mack Brown said "It wasn't even a game because we did not play in the first half." Sooner coach Bob Stoops said, "This was a total team victory, everybody made plays. ...We had a little bit of everything." OU President David Boren cancelled classes the following Monday on account of inclement weather: "It was snowing touchdowns in Dallas." Sooner running back Quentin Griffin scored six touchdowns, tying the all-time NCAA record for most rushing touchdowns in a game. Oklahoma went on to an undefeated season, and won the 2000 National Championship.

The 2001 game, which ended Oklahoma 14–Texas 3, was a classic defensive struggle that was notable for a play made late in the 4th quarter.

Both the Sooners' and the Longhorns' defenses were outstanding, holding their counterparts to less than 100 yards rushing for the entire game. When either offense could muster any momentum, they were often let down by their kicker: OU's Tim Duncan missed two field goals, and UT's Dusty Mangum had one blocked. OU led 7–3 at the half on the back of a Quentin Griffin 2-yard touchdown in the second quarter. That score held until late in the fourth quarter.

The Sooners got the ball with just over eight minutes to play on their own 20-yard line, and put together a 12-play, 53-yard drive that took them all the way to the Texas 27-yard line. Facing a 4th & 16, OU sent out Tim Duncan for what appeared to be a 44-yard FG attempt. Instead, Duncan sent a pooch punt deep into the Texas zone, which caught UT's Nathan Vasher off guard. Confused, Vasher caught the ball at his own 3-yard line and was immediately downed.

Down 7–3, Texas had 2:06 to drive 97 yards on the stiff Sooner defense. On first down, Texas quarterback Chris Simms' pass was deflected by OU safety Roy Williams, who had blitzed and literally leapt over the blocker, Brett Robin, to collide with Simms at the moment he released the ball. The ball landed right in Oklahoma linebacker Teddy Lehman's hands, who walked into the endzone for a touchdown. The play happened so fast, many fans did not know exactly what had happened. The play by Roy Williams is often called "The Superman Play" because of the way that Williams resembled Superman flying through the air with his arms stretched out at Chris Simms when he hit him. Duncan's extra point sealed the 14–3 OU victory.

=== 2004–2009 ===
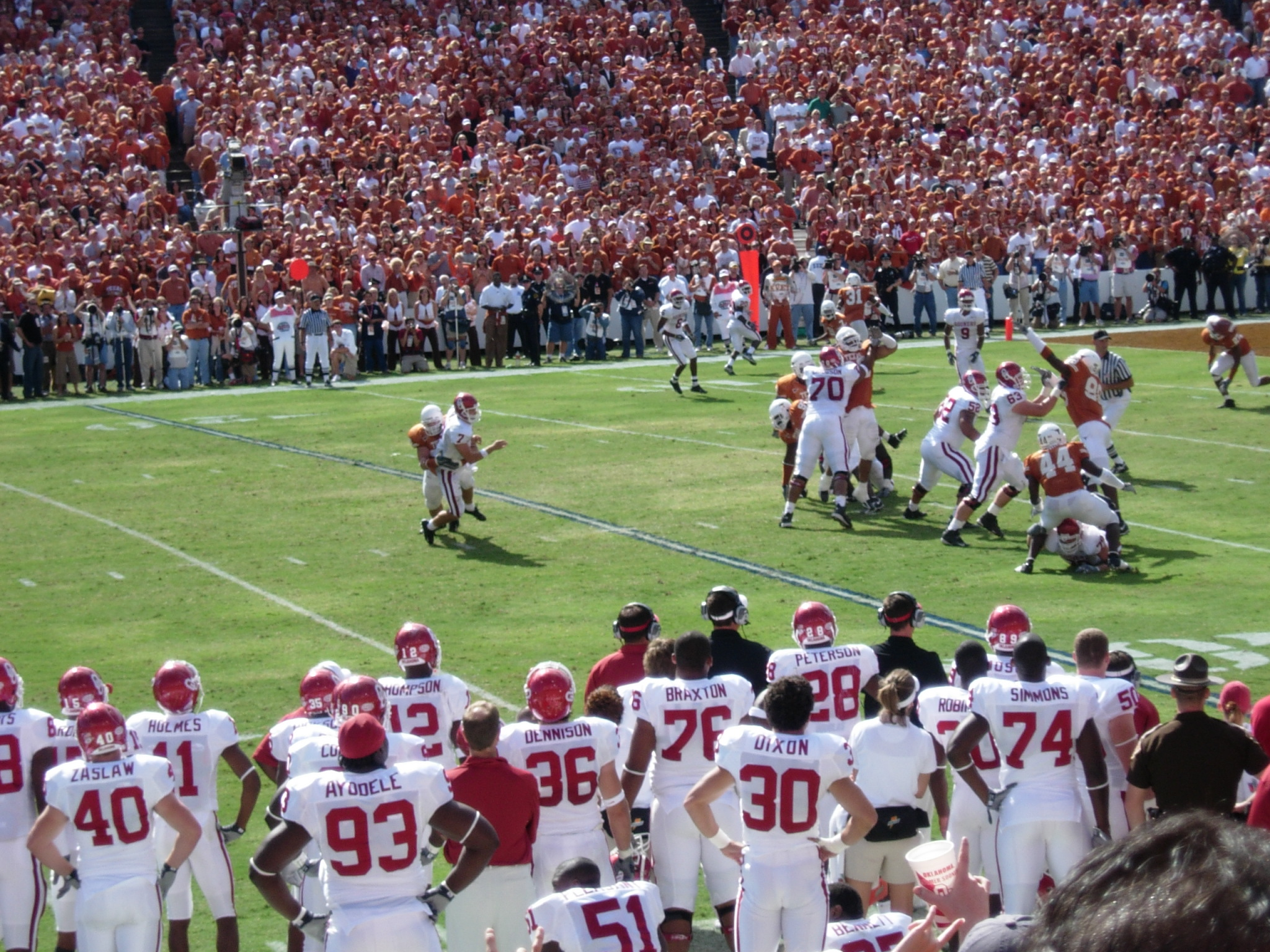
2005 Robison Pressures Bomar

The 2005 game, which ended Texas 45–Oklahoma 12, was the 100th meeting in the series and a special logo was created to commemorate the event. The game logo included both team logos, the logo of sponsor SBC Communications, the number 100, a football, and a star. Prior to the game, the Longhorns were ranked 2nd by the Associated Press, and the Sooners were unranked for the first time since 1999, which was also Texas's last victory over OU.

By breaking the string of five consecutive losses to Oklahoma, Longhorn coach Mack Brown preserved the Longhorns's National Championship hopes. With the win, Texas tied its largest margin of victory in the series. Freshman running back Jamaal Charles set a record for rushing yards by a Texas freshman in the series. With his 80-yard scamper, Charles also had the longest touchdown from scrimmage by a Texas running back in the series.

The game also featured one of the most violent hits in the series history, when Texas DE, Brian Robison, blindsided Oklahoma quarterback, Rhett Bomar, in the 4th quarter, causing a fumble and ensuing touchdown by Longhorn tackle, Rodrique Wright.

As had occurred the two seasons prior, the road to the National Championship game went through Dallas. Oklahoma left the game with a 1–1 conference record and a 2–3 record overall, finishing with a 6–2 conference and 8–4 overall record, including a victory in the Holiday Bowl. The Longhorns improved to 5–0 overall, 2–0 in the Big 12 on their way to an 8–0 conference, 13–0 overall record, including a victory in the Rose Bowl and the 2005 football National Championship.

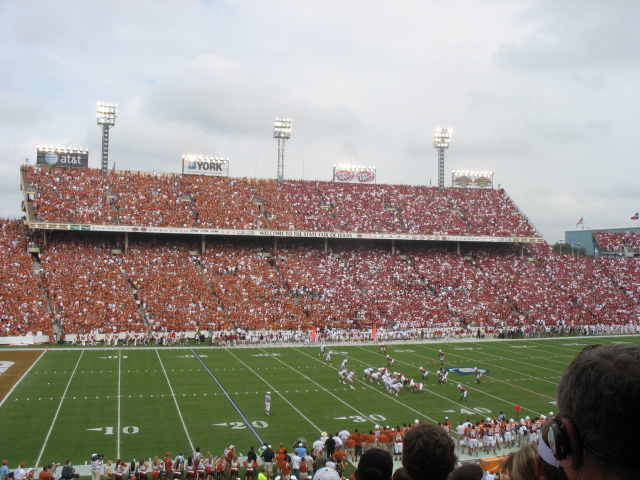
2007 Red River Rivalry

The 2007 match-up between Oklahoma and Texas was predicted to be the No. 3 game to watch in 2007 by SI.com's "Top 20 Games To Watch In 2007" list, and it did not disappoint. The game was close from start to finish as the Sooners struck first with a quick touchdown pass to TE Jermaine Gresham. QB Colt McCoy's passing attack responded quickly to tie the game for the 'Horns, then again to take a lead, particularly off the efforts of TE Jermichael Finley. The Sooners were able to tie the score going into the half off of another Sam Bradford-to-Jermaine Gresham connection. The Longhorns were able to get into the red zone at the beginning of the second half, but a costly fumble by RB Jamaal Charles at the 5-yard line cut short the momentum. A few series later, RB DeMarco Murray ripped off a 65-yard TD run to give the Sooners a 21–14 lead. The 'Horns did not take this lying down, as they were able to score soon thereafter. The Oklahoma passing attack scored the final touchdown of the game with about ten minutes left to play, on a 35-yard touchdown pass to WR Malcolm Kelly from Bradford. The 'Horns threatened twice in the final waning minutes, and it took a CB Reggie Smith interception and defensive play against star WR Limas Sweed to secure the win for Oklahoma.

The 2008 Meeting of the Red River Rivalry ended Texas 45-Oklahoma 35. At the time, it was the highest scoring event in the history of rivalry (the 2021 game now holds that record, with Oklahoma beating Texas, 55–48), and it was seen by the most fans, a record 92,182. Oklahoma ranked No. 1 in the nation and Texas was ranked No. 5. Both were 5–0 coming into the game. In the first quarter, Bradford completed a 5-yard touchdown pass to Manuel Johnson. The Sooners led 7–0. With 6:41 left in the first quarter, Texas answered with a Hunter Lawrence 26-yard field goal. OU scored 2 touchdowns in the second quarter and Texas scored two touchdowns and a field goal including a 96-yard kickoff return by Jordan Shipley. The score at the half was 21–20 OU.

=== 2009–2014 ===
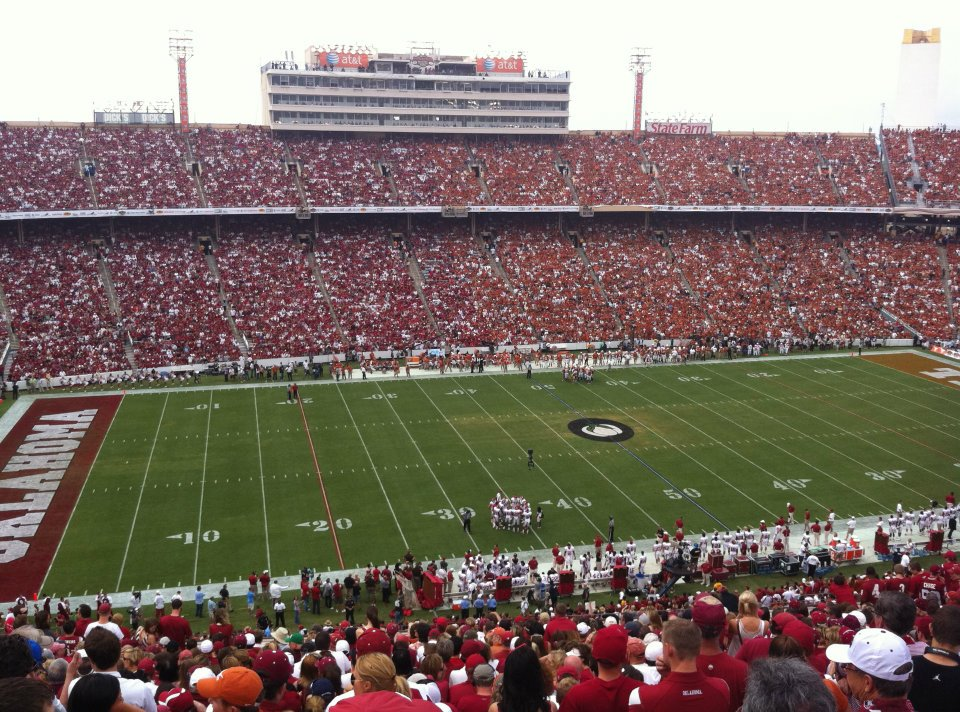
The 2012 Red River Rivalry

In 2009, Texas won a low-scoring game, 16–13. Texas scored one touchdown and three field goals, while OU scored one touchdown and two field goals. Oklahoma quarterback Sam Bradford had injured his shoulder earlier in the year when playing the BYU Cougars. Despite this injury, Bradford started, confident that his shoulder was healed. However, early in the first quarter a sack by Aaron Williams re-aggravated his injury and forced him out of the game, ending his season and his college career. Texas quarterback Colt McCoy threw for 127 yards, while the team combined for 142 rushing yards. OU's replacement quarterback, Landry Jones, replaced Bradford and threw for 250 yards of passing with 2 interceptions. The most notable statistic of the game was that the Sooners were held to minus 16 yards of rushing by the Longhorn defense.

In 2012, the 107th meeting of the Longhorns and Sooners, Oklahoma routed Texas 63–21. It appeared that the game would have a very different feel than the 2011 meeting after OU scored its first touchdown and Quandre Diggs of Texas recovered a blocked PAT, running the distance of the field to score a 2-point conversion. This game had moments that will add to the history of this rivalry: Oklahoma's Damien Williams broke free for a 95-yard touchdown run for the longest rush in Red River Rivalry history. Trey Millard had a 73-yard reception, the longest pass play by an OU player in Red River Rivalry history, surpassing Buddy Leake's 65-yarder in 1953. The Sooners lead the Longhorns most of this game, and Oklahoma ended up with a 677–289 advantage in total yardage. The game was the third 60+ point Red River scoring effort in Bob Stoops' tenure.

In 2013, Texas came onto the field in Dallas with head coach Mack Brown on the hot seat. Former Longhorn great Earl Campbell had publicly stated two weeks earlier that Mack Brown was "too old" to continue coaching. Brown's players rallied behind their beleaguered coach, however, and Texas won the Red River Rivalry game for the first time since 2009. Texas walked in as major underdogs, in part due to a 1–2 start with an upset loss at BYU and a loss to No. 25 Ole Miss. The game was notable in part because a defensive lineman from each team scored a touchdown on an interception return. In addition, Colt McCoy's brother Case led the Longhorns to victory, becoming the first quarterback to lead the team to victory since his brother in 2009.

In 2014, the game was played following both teams' losses the prior weekend. Oklahoma had fallen to No. 11 in the rankings following its loss to No. 25 TCU, with a 4–1 record (1–1 Big 12), whereas Texas had fallen to a 2–3 record after losing to No. 7 Baylor (also 1–1 Big 12). Texas' defense was able to prevent an Oklahoma offensive touchdown for the entire first half, and held the Sooners to under 30 total first-half yards, while the Texas Offense gained over 240 yards. In each game of the 2014 season, every team that had led the opposition by more than 200 yards gained was 57–0. However, another perfect record was on the line, as Oklahoma's first kick return was returned for a touchdown, and on Texas' first second-quarter possession, Oklahoma's defense forced an interception that was returned for a touchdown - in every Oklahoma game where that occurred, Oklahoma won (8–0). Oklahoma was able to widen the halftime score of 17–13 to 31–13 after a pair of offensive touchdowns, but Texas scored two late touchdowns of their own, failing on the second two-point conversion. Oklahoma was then able to take several minutes off the clock, and Texas was unable to score on its final possession, ending the game losing 26–31 to Oklahoma.

=== 2015–2019 ===
In 2015, Oklahoma walked into Dallas No. 10 in the country with a high-octane Air Raid offense, while Texas was unranked after a string of painful losses due to special teams (Cal 45–44, missed PAT; Oklahoma State 30–27, mishandled snap on punt setting up FG) and blowout losses (Notre Dame 38–3; TCU 50–7) and Charlie Strong's job already being in question in his second year. The Longhorns' running game pumped out 313 yards, which featured D'Onta Foreman breaking free for an 81-yard rush to set up a TD to put Texas up 24–10 while the young Texas defense held OU to 67 yards rushing. OU quarterback Baker Mayfield was sacked multiple times as Texas outgunned Oklahoma 24–17, giving Strong his first signature win.

In 2018, Texas came into Dallas ranked No. 19 facing the undefeated No. 7 Oklahoma Sooners, the first time both teams were ranked since 2012. Heisman hopeful Kyler Murray got Oklahoma out to a fast start scoring on a 6-play, 65-yard drive that took only 2:40. On the ensuing possession, Texas, led by sophomore quarterback Sam Ehlinger, answered back with a 5-play 75-yard drive, in what was to be a common theme in the highest scoring game in series history. Texas appeared destined to regain the Golden Hat after taking a commanding 45–24 lead with just under a minute left in the third quarter, but three unanswered touchdowns, including a 67-yard run by Kyler Murray that took only 11 seconds, tied the game at 45–45 with just 2:38 left to play. After driving the ball to the Oklahoma 23-yard line, Texas's Freshman kicker, Cameron Dicker, coolly kicked in a 40-yard game-winning field goal with 14 seconds left on the clock. Sam Ehlinger set the Texas Red River Showdown record for total offense with 394 yards.

On December 1 the same year, the two faced off again in AT&T Stadium in Arlington to determine the Big 12 Conference Championship. It was the third time in history when they played each other again in the same season (1901 and 1903). No. 5 Oklahoma overcame a strong start by No. 14 Texas to win their fourth straight Big 12 title.

On October 12, 2019, the sixth-ranked Sooners defeated the 11th-ranked Longhorns 34–27, getting 366 yards and four touchdowns from quarterback Jalen Hurts, a graduate transfer from Alabama. Though Oklahoma's lead was never larger than 14, Texas was playing from behind for almost the entire game, catching up midway through the third quarter before a 51-yard Hurts touchdown pass to CeeDee Lamb that put the Sooners in front for good.

=== 2020–present ===
The October 10, 2020, meeting saw unranked Oklahoma outlasting No. 22 Texas 53–45 in four overtimes, in the third-highest-scoring game in the history of the Red River Showdown.

The meetings on October 9, 2021, the first one since the two schools announced their move to the SEC, and October 8, 2022, featured two very distinct games, both setting records. The 2021 matchup saw sixth-ranked Sooners rallying from a 21-point first-quarter deficit to edge the 21st-ranked Longhorns 55–48 in the highest-scoring game in the rivalry. In 2022, 3–2 Texas won in a 49–0 shutout over the 3–2 Sooners, marking the first shutout result since 2004 and Texas' biggest win in the rivalry by scoring margin .

The October 7, 2023 game, the last meeting for both schools as Big 12 members, featured the first undefeated matchup in the rivalry since 2011. In the game, 12th-ranked Oklahoma defeated 3rd-ranked Texas 34–30 on a last-second touchdown pass to Nic Anderson. The game recorded 7.8 million viewers, the most since 2009, and was attended by SEC Commissioner Greg Sankey as both schools are set to join the SEC starting in 2024.

The October 12, 2024 installment of the Rivalry, the first one for both schools as members of the SEC, ended with a Texas win and a score of Texas 34, Oklahoma 3. Texas quarterback Quinn Ewers made his return from nearly a month lost to injury, and led the Longhorns to victory after a difficult first quarter where Texas trailed 0-3 and had given the ball away on a turnover deep in their own territory. Oklahoma was challenged to move the ball against the Texas defense throughout the contest, racking up only three points and 237 total yards against Texas' 406, despite winning the time of possession battle 32:07 to 27:53.

The October 11, 2025 game saw unranked Texas upset No. 6 Oklahoma 23–6. This was the first victory by an unranked Texas team over a ranked OU team since 2015 and largest upset in terms of score since 1971. After a slow first half where Oklahoma lead 6–3, the Longhorns took control of the game, holding OU to just 88 yards in the second half and intercepting Oklahoma quarterback John Mateer three total times. Leading 13–6 with nine minutes left in the game Longhorn wide receiver Ryan Niblett returned a punt 75 yards to the house to effectively seal the game. By the end Texas had out gained Oklahoma 304–258 in total yards, and won the time of possession battle 30:58 to 29:02.

October 10, 2026 saw the Longhorns enter as the undefeated No. 1 team in the country while Oklahoma was 2-2 and a team struggling for an identity. However, it would be the Sooners who emerged victorious with a 27-24 final score, the first time Oklahoma had beaten a top-ranked Texas. Defense and special teams made the difference for OU as they returned a blocked punt for a touchdown and Texas quarterback Arch Manning was intercepted twice, one of which was ran back for a touchdown and the other was picked off with 15 seconds left, the scores level, and the Longhorns attempting to get into field goal range. John Mateer quickly completed two big passes to Isaiah Sategna III which now put the Sooners in a kickable spot, and Tate Sandell split the uprights from 47 yards as the clock expired.

== Venue ==
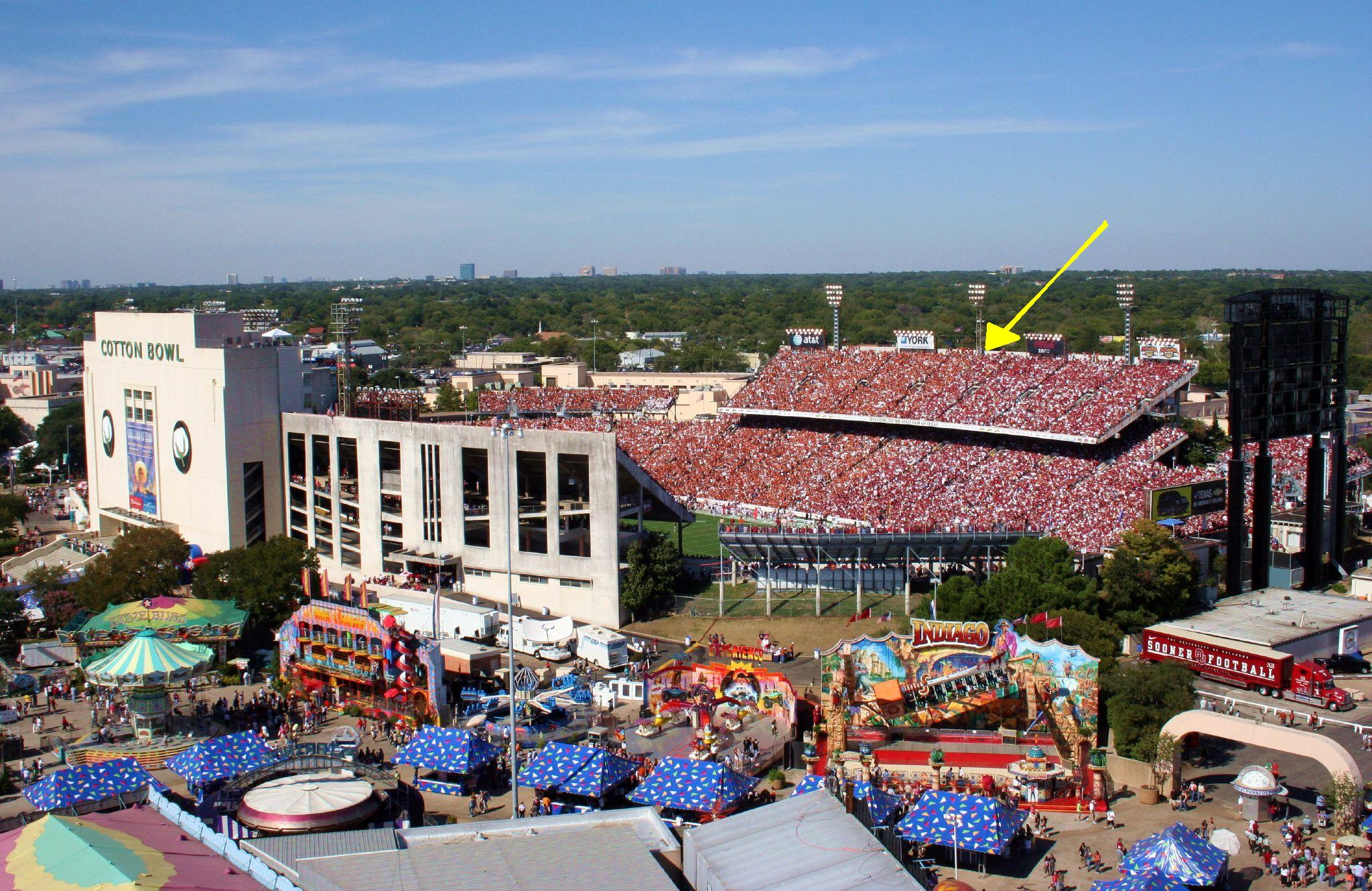
2006 Red River Rivalry with yellow arrow indicating the seating division in the stands

The Oklahoma–Texas game has been played in six locations. They have played in Norman and Oklahoma City in Oklahoma, and Arlington, Austin, Dallas and Houston in Texas. The series began in 1900 and has been played in Dallas since 1912, except for 1913 (Houston), 1922 (Norman), and 1923 (Austin). Dallas was chosen as a "neutral" site since it is situated approximately halfway between Austin, Texas and Norman, Oklahoma— the sites of the main campuses of the University of Texas at Austin and the University of Oklahoma, respectively.

Since 1932, the game has been held at the Cotton Bowl in Dallas, during the State Fair of Texas. The designated "home" team alternates from year to year: Oklahoma in even-numbered years and Texas in odd-numbered years. Ticket sales for the game are split 50–50 between the two schools, with the stadium divided along the 50-yard line. Historically, the Oklahoma fans have occupied the south end zone, which contains the tunnel where both teams enter and exit the field. Beginning in 2007, the teams have had the option to alternate North and South ends of the field, thereby giving the home team fans the seats adjacent to the tunnel leading to both teams' locker rooms. However, Texas has declined to exercise its option to move to the south end each year in which they have been the designated home team. Former Texas coach Charlie Strong said he would favor Texas fans being in the south end zone during their home games.

The game is subsidized by the city of Dallas to prevent the game from moving to AT&T Stadium in Arlington. Since 2012, the teams have received a combined $1 million from the city each year for playing it. In 2014, Dallas officials announced that the game would be held at Fair Park through 2025. In 2023, this was further extended through 2036.

== Game results ==
Rankings from AP poll (and CFP Rankings, for 2018 Big 12 Championship Game), released prior to game.

Oklahoma victories	Texas victories	Tie games

No.	Date	Location	Winning team		Losing team	
1	October 10, 1900	Austin	Texas	28	Oklahoma	2
2	October 19, 1901	Austin	Texas	12	Oklahoma	6
3	November 25, 1901	Norman	Texas	11	Oklahoma	0
4	October 8, 1902	Austin	Texas	22	Oklahoma	6
5	October 17, 1903	Austin	Tie	6	Tie	6
6	November 13, 1903	Oklahoma City	Texas	11	Oklahoma	5
7	November 12, 1904	Austin	Texas	40	Oklahoma	10
8	November 3, 1905	Oklahoma City	Oklahoma	2	Texas	0
9	November 2, 1906	Oklahoma City	Texas	10	Oklahoma	9
10	November 15, 1907	Austin	Texas	29	Oklahoma	10
11	November 13, 1908	Norman	Oklahoma	50	Texas	0
12	November 19, 1909	Austin	Texas	30	Oklahoma	0
13	November 24, 1910	Austin	Oklahoma	3	Texas	0
14	November 25, 1911	Austin	Oklahoma	6	Texas	3
15	October 19, 1912	Dallas	Oklahoma	21	Texas	6
16	November 10, 1913	Houston	Texas	14	Oklahoma	6
17	October 24, 1914	Dallas	Texas	32	Oklahoma	7
18	October 23, 1915	Dallas	Oklahoma	14	Texas	13
19	October 21, 1916	Dallas	Texas	21	Oklahoma	7
20	October 20, 1917	Dallas	Oklahoma	14	Texas	0
21	October 18, 1919	Dallas	Oklahoma	12	Texas	7
22	November 18, 1922	Norman	Texas	32	Oklahoma	7
23	November 17, 1923	Austin	Texas	26	Oklahoma	14
24	October 19, 1929	Dallas	Texas	21	Oklahoma	0
25	October 18, 1930	Dallas	Texas	17	Oklahoma	7
26	October 17, 1931	Dallas	Texas	3	Oklahoma	0
27	October 15, 1932	Dallas	Texas	17	Oklahoma	10
28	October 14, 1933	Dallas	Oklahoma	9	Texas	0
29	October 13, 1934	Dallas	Texas	19	Oklahoma	0
30	October 12, 1935	Dallas	Texas	12	Oklahoma	7
31	October 10, 1936	Dallas	Texas	6	Oklahoma	0
32	October 9, 1937	Dallas	Tie	7	Tie	7
33	October 8, 1938	Dallas	No. 14 Oklahoma	13	Texas	0
34	October 14, 1939	Dallas	No. 3 Oklahoma	24	Texas	12
35	October 12, 1940	Dallas	Texas	19	Oklahoma	16
36	October 11, 1941	Dallas	Texas	40	Oklahoma	7
37	October 10, 1942	Dallas	Texas	7	Oklahoma	0
38	October 9, 1943	Dallas	Texas	13	Oklahoma	7
39	October 14, 1944	Dallas	Texas	20	Oklahoma	0
40	October 13, 1945	Dallas	No. 10 Texas	12	Oklahoma	7
41	October 12, 1946	Dallas	No. 1 Texas	20	Oklahoma	13
42	October 11, 1947	Dallas	No. 3 Texas	34	No. 15 Oklahoma	14
43	October 9, 1948	Dallas	No. 16 Oklahoma	20	Texas	14
44	October 8, 1949	Dallas	No. 3 Oklahoma	20	No. 12 Texas	14
45	October 14, 1950	Dallas	No. 3 Oklahoma	14	No. 4 Texas	13
46	October 13, 1951	Dallas	No. 6 Texas	9	No. 11 Oklahoma	7
47	October 11, 1952	Dallas	No. 12 Oklahoma	49	Texas	20
48	October 10, 1953	Dallas	No. 16 Oklahoma	19	No. 15 Texas	14
49	October 9, 1954	Dallas	No. 1 Oklahoma	14	No. 15 Texas	7
50	October 8, 1955	Dallas	No. 3 Oklahoma	20	Texas	0
51	October 13, 1956	Dallas	No. 1 Oklahoma	45	Texas	0
52	October 12, 1957	Dallas	No. 1 Oklahoma	21	Texas	7
53	October 11, 1958	Dallas	No. 16 Texas	15	No. 2 Oklahoma	14
54	October 10, 1959	Dallas	No. 4 Texas	19	No. 13 Oklahoma	12
55	October 8, 1960	Dallas	No. 15 Texas	24	Oklahoma	0
56	October 14, 1961	Dallas	No. 4 Texas	28	Oklahoma	7
57	October 13, 1962	Dallas	No. 2 Texas	9	Oklahoma	6
58	October 12, 1963	Dallas	No. 2 Texas	28	No. 1 Oklahoma	7
59	October 10, 1964	Dallas	No. 1 Texas	28	Oklahoma	7
60	October 9, 1965	Dallas	No. 1 Texas	19	Oklahoma	0
61	October 8, 1966	Dallas	Oklahoma	18	Texas	9
62	October 14, 1967	Dallas	Texas	9	Oklahoma	7

No.	Date	Location	Winning team		Losing team	
63	October 12, 1968	Dallas	Texas	26	Oklahoma	20
64	October 11, 1969	Dallas	No. 2 Texas	27	No. 8 Oklahoma	17
65	October 10, 1970	Dallas	No. 2 Texas	41	Oklahoma	9
66	October 9, 1971	Dallas	No. 4 Oklahoma	48	No. 3 Texas	27
67	October 14, 1972	Dallas	No. 2 Oklahoma	27	No. 10 Texas	0
68	October 13, 1973	Dallas	No. 6 Oklahoma	52	No. 13 Texas	13
69	October 12, 1974	Dallas	No. 2 Oklahoma	16	No. 17 Texas	13
70	October 11, 1975	Dallas	No. 2 Oklahoma	24	No. 5 Texas	17
71	October 9, 1976	Dallas	Tie	6	Tie	6
72	October 8, 1977	Dallas	No. 5 Texas	13	No. 2 Oklahoma	6
73	October 7, 1978	Dallas	No. 1 Oklahoma	31	No. 6 Texas	10
74	October 13, 1979	Dallas	No. 4 Texas	16	No. 3 Oklahoma	7
75	October 11, 1980	Dallas	No. 3 Texas	20	No. 12 Oklahoma	13
76	October 10, 1981	Dallas	No. 3 Texas	34	No. 10 Oklahoma	14
77	October 9, 1982	Dallas	Oklahoma	28	No. 13 Texas	22
78	October 8, 1983	Dallas	No. 2 Texas	28	No. 8 Oklahoma	16
79	October 13, 1984	Dallas	Tie	15	Tie	15
80	October 12, 1985	Dallas	No. 2 Oklahoma	14	No. 7 Texas	7
81	October 11, 1986	Dallas	No. 6 Oklahoma	47	Texas	12
82	October 10, 1987	Dallas	No. 1 Oklahoma	44	Texas	9
83	October 8, 1988	Dallas	No. 10 Oklahoma	28	Texas	13
84	October 14, 1989	Dallas	Texas	28	No. 15 Oklahoma	24
85	October 13, 1990	Dallas	Texas	14	No. 4 Oklahoma	13
86	October 12, 1991	Dallas	Texas	10	No. 6 Oklahoma	7
87	October 10, 1992	Dallas	Texas	34	No. 16 Oklahoma	24
88	October 9, 1993	Dallas	No. 10 Oklahoma	38	Texas	17
89	October 8, 1994	Dallas	No. 15 Texas	17	No. 16 Oklahoma	10
90	October 14, 1995	Dallas	Tie	24	Tie	24
91	October 12, 1996	Dallas	Oklahoma	30	No. 25 Texas	27 ^{OT}
92	October 11, 1997	Dallas	Texas	27	Oklahoma	24
93	October 10, 1998	Dallas	Texas	34	Oklahoma	3
94	October 9, 1999	Dallas	No. 23 Texas	38	Oklahoma	28
95	October 7, 2000	Dallas	No. 10 Oklahoma	63	No. 11 Texas	14
96	October 6, 2001	Dallas	No. 3 Oklahoma	14	No. 5 Texas	3
97	October 12, 2002	Dallas	No. 2 Oklahoma	35	No. 3 Texas	24
98	October 11, 2003	Dallas	No. 1 Oklahoma	65	No. 11 Texas	13
99	October 9, 2004	Dallas	No. 2 Oklahoma	12	No. 5 Texas	0
100	October 8, 2005	Dallas	No. 2 Texas	45	Oklahoma	12
101	October 7, 2006	Dallas	No. 7 Texas	28	No. 14 Oklahoma	10
102	October 6, 2007	Dallas	No. 10 Oklahoma	28	No. 19 Texas	21
103	October 11, 2008	Dallas	No. 5 Texas	45	No. 1 Oklahoma	35
104	October 17, 2009	Dallas	No. 3 Texas	16	No. 20 Oklahoma	13
105	October 2, 2010	Dallas	No. 8 Oklahoma	28	No. 21 Texas	20
106	October 8, 2011	Dallas	No. 3 Oklahoma	55	No. 11 Texas	17
107	October 13, 2012	Dallas	No. 13 Oklahoma	63	No.15 Texas	21
108	October 12, 2013	Dallas	Texas	36	No. 12 Oklahoma	20
109	October 11, 2014	Dallas	No. 11 Oklahoma	31	Texas	26
110	October 10, 2015	Dallas	Texas	24	No. 10 Oklahoma	17
111	October 8, 2016	Dallas	No. 20 Oklahoma	45	Texas	40
112	October 14, 2017	Dallas	No. 12 Oklahoma	29	Texas	24
113	October 6, 2018	Dallas	No. 19 Texas	48	No. 7 Oklahoma	45
114	December 1, 2018	Arlington	No. 5 Oklahoma	39	No. 14 Texas	27
115	October 12, 2019	Dallas	No. 6 Oklahoma	34	No. 11 Texas	27
116	October 10, 2020	Dallas	Oklahoma	53	No. 22 Texas	45 ^{4OT}
117	October 9, 2021	Dallas	No. 6 Oklahoma	55	No. 21 Texas	48
118	October 8, 2022	Dallas	Texas	49	Oklahoma	0
119	October 7, 2023	Dallas	No. 12 Oklahoma	34	No. 3 Texas	30
120	October 12, 2024	Dallas	No. 1 Texas	34	No. 18 Oklahoma	3
121	October 11, 2025	Dallas	Texas	23	No. 6 Oklahoma	6
122	October 10, 2026	Dallas	Oklahoma	27	No. 1 Texas	24
Series: Texas leads 65–52–5

=== Top-5 games ===
Since 1936, when the AP poll began being released continuously, the Longhorns and Sooners have met 11 times when both have been ranked in the top 5. The first instance came in 1950, with the most recent in 2008. Unlike most college rivalry games, the results of these games did not usually affect each team's final standings because it is held in early October. The 1963 and 1984 games were the only times the teams were the top two in the rankings.

Oklahoma holds a 6–4–1 record in these top-5 meetings.

Year	Away team		Home team		Notes
1950	No. 4 Texas	13	No. 3 Oklahoma	14	
1963	No. 1 Oklahoma	7	No. 2 Texas	28	
1971	No. 4 Oklahoma	48	No. 3 Texas	27	
1975	No. 2 Oklahoma	24	No. 5 Texas	17	
1977	No. 2 Oklahoma	6	No. 5 Texas	13	
1979	No. 3 Oklahoma	7	No. 4 Texas	16	
1984	No. 1 Texas	15	No. 2 Oklahoma	15	
2001	No. 3 Oklahoma	14	No. 5 Texas	3	
2002	No. 3 Texas	24	No. 2 Oklahoma	35	
2004	No. 5 Texas	0	No. 2 Oklahoma	12	
2008	No. 5 Texas	45	No. 1 Oklahoma	35	

== Miscellaneous ==
=== Highest attendance ===
The highest attendance in series history is 96,009, achieved in 2009, 2010, and 2011.

Rank	Date	Attendance	Winning team		Losing team	
1	October 17, 2009	96,009	No. 3 Texas	16	No. 20 Oklahoma	13
1	October 2, 2010	96,009	No. 8 Oklahoma	28	No. 21 Texas	20
1	October 8, 2011	96,009	No. 3 Oklahoma	55	No. 11 Texas	17
4	October 14, 2017	93,552	No. 12 Oklahoma	29	Texas	24
5	October 13, 2012	92,500	No. 10 Oklahoma	63	No. 15 Texas	21
5	October 12, 2013	92,500	Texas	36	No. 12 Oklahoma	20
7	October 6, 2018	92,300	No. 19 Texas	48	No. 7 Oklahoma	45
8	October 11, 2008	92,182	No. 5 Texas	45	No. 1 Oklahoma	35
9	October 13, 2016	92,100	No. 20 Oklahoma	45	Texas	40
9	October 12, 2019	92,100	No. 6 Oklahoma	34	No. 11 Texas	27
9	October 8, 2022	92,100	Texas	49	Oklahoma	0
9	October 12, 2024	92,100	No. 1 Texas	34	No. 18 Oklahoma	3

=== Results by Location ===
As of October 11, 2025

State	City	Games	Texas victories	Oklahoma victories	Ties	
Oklahoma	Norman	3	2	1	0	
Oklahoma	Oklahoma City	3	2	1	0	
Oklahoma	Total	6	4	2	0	
Texas	Dallas	103	53	47	4	
Texas	Austin	10	7	2	1	
Texas	Arlington	1	0	1	0	
Texas	Houston	1	1	0	0	
Texas		Total	115	61	49	5
Series total		121	65	52	5	

=== Results by decade ===
As of October 11, 2025

Years	Games	Texas victories	Oklahoma victories	Ties
1900s	12	9	2	1
1910s	9	3	6	0
1920s	3	3	0	0
1930s	10	6	3	1
1940s	10	8	2	0
1950s	10	3	7	0
1960s	10	9	1	0
1970s	10	3	6	1
1980s	10	4	5	1
1990s	10	7	2	1
2000s	10	4	6	0
2010s	11	3	8	0
2020s	6	3	4	0
Total	121	65	52	5

== Game trophies ==
There are three Red River Rivalry trophies given to the winner of the annual Red River Rivalry: the Golden Hat, the Red River Rivalry trophy, and the Governors' trophy.

=== Golden Hat ===
The Golden Hat is by far the best known of the three, and the only one to be awarded on the field at the end of the game. The trophy is a gold cowboy hat mounted on a large block of wood. According to The Daily Texan,

[B]oth teams signed a contract to play in Dallas during the Texas State Fair, beginning with the 1929 season. The deal was for 10 years, but the tradition has carried on for three-quarters of a century. To show its gratitude, the fair donated the Golden Hat trophy, a golden replica of a ten-gallon cowboy hat, which the two teams play for every year. The Longhorns won the first Shootout, but since then the Golden Hat has crossed the Red River many times.

The trophy was created in 1941. When it was created it was known as the "Bronze Hat" or "Brass Hat", as it was bronze in color. However, when the hat was reworked in the 1970s it came out gold, and is now known as the Golden Hat. The Golden Hat trophy is kept each year by the winning team's athletic department. With the teams meeting twice in 2018 (once in the regular season and once in the Big 12 Conference Championship Game) it was determined that the Golden Hat would not be on the line in the 2nd game as it was for the regular-season game. Therefore, the trophy remained in Austin, Texas, after Texas' 48–45 regular-season win over Oklahoma in 2018. Oklahoma won the rematch, 39–27 in the Big 12 Title Game.

=== Red River Rivalry trophy ===
Since 2003, the Red River Rivalry trophy has been exchanged between the student bodies of the two schools. This trophy was developed by Alex Yaffe, former OU Student Body President, and Katie King, UT's former student body president. The trophy bears the image of the two states as well as miniature football helmets to represent both teams.

=== Governors' trophy ===
There is also a governors' trophy exchanged between the governors of the two states. The governors of Texas and Oklahoma often place a bet on the game, such as the losing governor having to present a side of beef to the winning state governor, who then donates the beef to charity.

=== NROTC trophy ===
Another annual tradition is the running of game balls by the schools' Naval Reserve Officer Training Corps programs. Each school's NROTC program uses a relay running system to run one game ball all the way from their respective campus to Dallas. Once there, they participate against each other in a football scrimmage, with the winner taking home the Red River Shootout Flag Football Trophy. This trophy is awarded without regard to who wins the main football game.

== See also ==
- List of NCAA college football rivalry games
- List of most-played college football series in NCAA Division I
