= 2018 Oklahoma State Cowboys football team =

American college football season

2018 Oklahoma State Cowboys football

Liberty Bowl champion

Liberty Bowl, W 38–33 vs. Missouri
- Conference: Big 12 Conference
- Record: 7–6 (3–6 Big 12)
- Head coach: Mike Gundy (14th season)
- Offensive coordinator: Mike Yurcich (6th season)
- Offensive scheme: Spread
- Defensive coordinator: Jim Knowles (1st season)
- Base defense: 4–2–5
- Home stadium: Boone Pickens Stadium

2018 Big 12 Conference football standings
	Conf.			Overall
Team	W		L	W		L
No. 4 Oklahoma y$^	8	–	1	12	–	2
No. 9 Texas y	7	–	2	10	–	4
Iowa State	6	–	3	8	–	5
No. 20 West Virginia	6	–	3	8	–	4
TCU	4	–	5	7	–	6
Baylor	4	–	5	7	–	6
Oklahoma State	3	–	6	7	–	6
Kansas State	3	–	6	5	–	7
Texas Tech	3	–	6	5	–	7
Kansas	1	–	8	3	–	9
Championship: Oklahoma 39, Texas 27
^ – College Football Playoff participant; $ – Conference champion; y – Championship game participant; Rankings from AP Poll

The 2018 Oklahoma State Cowboys football team represented Oklahoma State University in the 2018 NCAA Division I FBS football season. The Cowboys played their home games at the Boone Pickens Stadium in Stillwater, Oklahoma and competed in the Big 12 Conference. They were led by 14th-year head coach Mike Gundy. They finished the season 7–6, 3–6 in Big 12 play to finish tied for seventh. They were invited to the Liberty Bowl where they defeated #24 Missouri 38-33, ending the season with a 4-1 record against teams in the top 25.

== Preseason ==
=== Award watch lists ===
Listed in the order that they were released

Award	Player	Position	Year
Chuck Bednarik Award	Justin Phillips	LB	SR
Doak Walker Award	Justice Hill	RB	JR
Butkus Award	Justin Phillips	LB	SR
Outland Trophy	Marcus Keyes	OL	JR
Lou Groza Award	Matt Ammendola	K	JR
Walter Camp Award	Justice Hill	RB	JR
Ted Hendricks Award	Jordan Brailford	DE	JR
Johnny Unitas Golden Arm Award	Taylor Cornelius	QB	SR

=== Big 12 media poll ===
The Big 12 media poll was released on July 12, 2018, with the Cowboys predicted to finish in fifth place.

Media poll
Predicted finish	Team	Votes (1st place)
1	Oklahoma	509 (46)
2	West Virginia	432 (2)
3	TCU	390 (1)
4	Texas	370 (1)
5	Oklahoma State	300
6	Kansas State	283 (2)
7	Iowa State	250
8	Texas Tech	149
9	Baylor	125
10	Kansas	52

== Schedule ==
Date	Time	Opponent	Rank	Site	TV	Result	Attendance
August 30	7:00 p.m.	Missouri State*		Boone Pickens Stadium; Stillwater, OK	FS1	W 58–17	50,103
September 8	7:00 p.m.	South Alabama*		Boone Pickens Stadium; Stillwater, OK	FSN	W 55–13	53,923
September 15	2:30 p.m.	No. 17 Boise State*	No. 24	Boone Pickens Stadium; Stillwater, OK	ESPN	W 44–21	54,974
September 22	6:00 p.m.	Texas Tech	No. 15	Boone Pickens Stadium; Stillwater, OK	FS1	L 17–41	53,166
September 29	11:00 a.m.	at Kansas		David Booth Kansas Memorial Stadium; Lawrence, KS	FSN	W 48–28	18,364
October 6	2:30 p.m.	Iowa State	No. 25	Boone Pickens Stadium; Stillwater, OK	ESPN2	L 42–48	52,995
October 13	11:00 a.m.	at Kansas State		Bill Snyder Family Football Stadium; Manhattan, KS	ESPNU	L 12–31	50,245
October 27	7:00 p.m.	No. 6 Texas^{†}		Boone Pickens Stadium; Stillwater, OK	ABC	W 38–35	56,790
November 3	11:00 a.m.	at Baylor		McLane Stadium; Waco, TX	FS1	L 31–35	43,492
November 10	2:30 p.m.	at No. 6 Oklahoma		Gaylord Family Oklahoma Memorial Stadium; Norman, OK (Bedlam Series)	ABC	L 47–48	87,635
November 17	2:30 p.m.	No. 7 West Virginia		Boone Pickens Stadium; Stillwater, OK	ABC	W 45–41	52,842
November 24	7:00 p.m.	at TCU		Amon G. Carter Stadium; Fort Worth, TX	FOX	L 24–31	42,394
December 31	2:45 p.m.	vs. No. 24 Missouri*		Liberty Bowl Memorial Stadium; Memphis, TN (Liberty Bowl)	ESPN	W 38–33	76,468
*Non-conference game; ^{†}Homecoming; Rankings from AP Poll released prior to the game; All times are in Central time

Schedule source:

== Game summaries ==
=== Missouri State ===
	1	2	3	4	Total
Bears	0	7	10	0	17
Cowboys	17	14	14	13	58

=== South Alabama ===
	1	2	3	4	Total
Jaguars	7	6	0	0	13
Cowboys	14	17	10	14	55

=== Boise State ===
	1	2	3	4	Total
No. 17 Broncos	0	7	14	0	21
No. 24 Cowboys	0	17	17	10	44

=== Texas Tech ===
	1	2	3	4	Total
Red Raiders	7	17	10	7	41
No. 15 Cowboys	10	7	0	0	17

=== At Kansas ===
	1	2	3	4	Total
Cowboys	14	10	10	14	48
Jayhawks	0	7	7	14	28

=== Iowa State ===
	1	2	3	4	Total
Cyclones	9	21	10	8	48
No. 25 Cowboys	7	14	7	14	42

Iowa State's Freshman Brock Purdy replaced Zeb Noland at quarterback and passed 18-for-23 for 318 yards and produced four touchdowns. He then ran for another 84 yards and another score. The final score was a loss for the Cowboys at 48-42.

=== At Kansas State ===
	1	2	3	4	Total
Cowboys	3	3	0	6	12
Wildcats	0	3	14	14	31

The previous week loss against Iowa State put extra pressure on the Cowboys to win coming into the game against Kansas State. Some of the issues the Cowboys bring in to the include lack of discipline, a disconnected defense, and a failure to force turnovers on defense. The 2018 loss to Iowa State had many similarities to the 2017 game between Oklahoma State and Kansas State that resulted in a K-State victory 45-40.

=== Texas ===
	1	2	3	4	Total
No. 6 Longhorns	7	7	7	14	35
Cowboys	17	14	0	7	38

=== At Baylor ===
	1	2	3	4	Total
Cowboys	7	3	14	7	31
Bears	0	14	7	14	35

=== Oklahoma ===
	1	2	3	4	Total
Cowboys	14	14	7	12	47
No. 6 Sooners	14	20	7	7	48

=== West Virginia ===
	1	2	3	4	Total
No. 7 Mountaineers	14	17	0	10	41
Cowboys	7	7	10	21	45

=== At TCU ===
	1	2	3	4	Total
Cowboys	3	0	7	14	24
Horned Frogs	0	7	17	7	31

=== Vs. Missouri (Liberty Bowl) ===
	1	2	3	4	Total
Cowboys	7	7	21	3	38
No. 24 Tigers	3	13	3	14	33

== Statistics ==
=== Scoring ===
Scores against non-conference opponents

	1	2	3	4	Total
Opponents					0
Oklahoma State					0

Scores against the Big 12

	1	2	3	4	Total
Opponents					0
Oklahoma State					0

Scores against all opponents

	1	2	3	4	Total
Opponents					0
Oklahoma State					0

== Rankings ==
Ranking movements Legend: ██ Increase in ranking ██ Decrease in ranking — = Not ranked RV = Received votes
	Week															
Poll	Pre	1	2	3	4	5	6	7	8	9	10	11	12	13	14	Final
AP	RV	RV	24	15	RV	25	—	—	—	RV	—	—	—	—	—	RV
Coaches	25	23	19	15	21	21	—	—	—	RV	—	—	RV	—	—	—
CFP	Not released									—	—	—	—	—	—	Not released

== Players drafted into the NFL ==
Round	Pick	Player	Position	NFL Club
4	113	Justice Hill	RB	Baltimore Ravens
7	253	Jordan Brailford	DE	Washington Redskins
