= Elijah Sullivan =

American football player (born 1997)

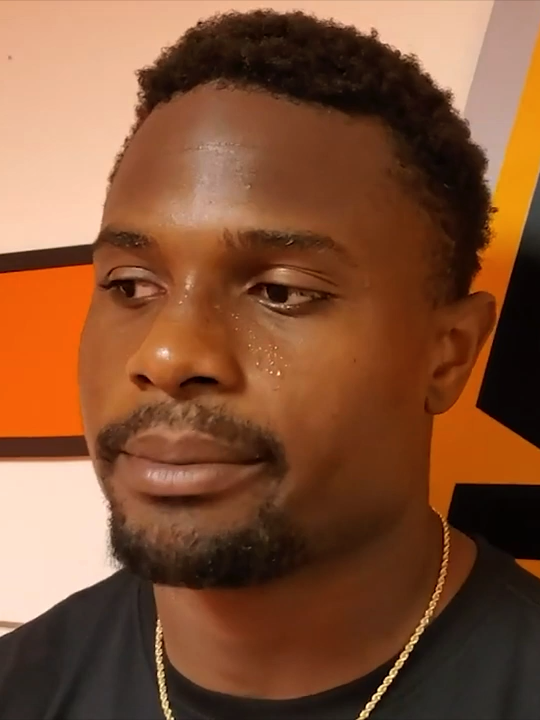
- Sullivan in 2019

Profile
- Position: Linebacker

Personal information
- Born: May 13, 1997 (age 29); Tucker, Georgia, U.S.
- Listed height: 6 ft 0 in (1.83 m)
- Listed weight: 225 lb (102 kg)

Career information
- High school: Tucker High School (Tucker, Georgia)
- College: Kansas State (2015–2020)
- NFL draft: 2021: undrafted

Career history
- San Francisco 49ers (2021)*; Kansas City Chiefs (2021)*; Jacksonville Jaguars (2022)*; Birmingham Stallions (2023–2024)
- * Offseason or practice squad member only

Awards and highlights
- UFL champion (2024); USFL champion (2023)

Elijah Sullivan (born May 13, 1997) is an American professional football linebacker. He played college football for the Kansas State Wildcats.

== Professional career ==
=== San Francisco 49ers ===
Sullivan was signed by the San Francisco 49ers as an undrafted free agent on May 14, 2021. He was waived on September 1, 2021, and re-signed to the practice squad, but released on September 7.

=== Kansas City Chiefs ===
On September 11, 2021, Sullivan was signed to the Kansas City Chiefs practice squad. He was released on January 18, 2022.

=== Jacksonville Jaguars ===
On February 7, 2022, Sullivan signed a reserve/future contract with the Jacksonville Jaguars. He was waived on May 2, 2022.

=== Birmingham Stallions ===
Sullivan signed with the Birmingham Stallions of the United States Football League on September 17, 2022. He was released on March 20, 2025.

Pre-draft measurables
Height	Weight	Arm length	Hand span	40-yard dash	10-yard split	20-yard split	20-yard shuttle	Three-cone drill	Broad jump	Bench press
6 ft 0 in (1.83 m)	214 lb (97 kg)	32 in (0.81 m)	8 1/8 in (0.21 m)	4.69 s	1.61 s	2.62 s	4.31 s	7.12 s	9 ft 7 in (2.92 m)	13 reps
All values from Pro Day
