= 2018 Big 12 Championship Game =

- 17th Big 12 Conference Championship
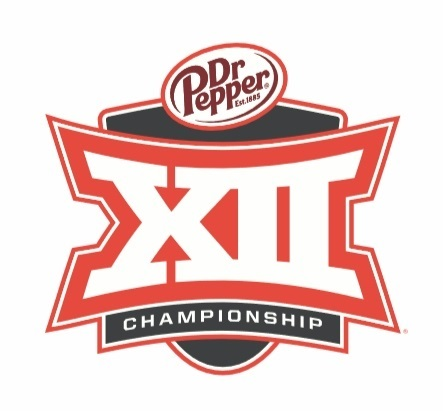
Texas Longhorns	Oklahoma Sooners
(9–3)	(11–1)
27	39
Head coach: Tom Herman	Head coach: Lincoln Riley
AP / Coaches / CFP; 9 / 9 / 14	AP / Coaches / CFP; 5 / 5 / 5
	1	2	3	4	Total
Texas	7	7	13	0	27
Oklahoma	3	17	7	12	39
- Date: December 1, 2018
- Season: 2018
- Stadium: AT&T Stadium
- Location: Arlington, Texas
- Referee: Reggie Smith
- Attendance: 83,114

United States TV coverage
- Network: ABC/ESPN Radio
- Announcers: ABC: Sean McDonough (Play-By-Play); Todd Blackledge (Analyst); Holly Rowe (Sidelines); ESPN Radio: Marc Kestecher (Play-By-Play); Dusty Dvoracek (Analyst)

2018 Big 12 Conference football standings
	Conf.			Overall
Team	W		L	W		L
No. 4 Oklahoma y$^	8	–	1	12	–	2
No. 9 Texas y	7	–	2	10	–	4
Iowa State	6	–	3	8	–	5
No. 20 West Virginia	6	–	3	8	–	4
TCU	4	–	5	7	–	6
Baylor	4	–	5	7	–	6
Oklahoma State	3	–	6	7	–	6
Kansas State	3	–	6	5	–	7
Texas Tech	3	–	6	5	–	7
Kansas	1	–	8	3	–	9
Championship: Oklahoma 39, Texas 27
^ – College Football Playoff participant; $ – Conference champion; y – Championship game participant; Rankings from AP Poll

The 2018 Big 12 Championship Game was a college football game played on Saturday, December 1, 2018, at AT&T Stadium in Arlington. This was the 17th Big 12 Championship Game and determined the 2018 champion of the Big 12 Conference. The game featured the top-seeded, Oklahoma Sooners and the second-seeded, Texas Longhorns. Sponsored by soft drink company Dr Pepper, the game was known as the Dr Pepper Big 12 Championship Game.

The game marked the first time since 1903 that Texas and Oklahoma played each other twice in the same season. In addition, it was first meeting between the two since 1923 that was not held at the Cotton Bowl Stadium. The game broke the Conference Championship attendance record, which was previously held by the 1992 SEC Championship Game.

== Previous season ==
The 2017 Big 12 Championship Game was the first since the conference's realignment. Televised nationally by Fox, the game featured the Oklahoma Sooners and the TCU Horned Frogs. This was Oklahoma's ninth appearance and was TCU's first appearance. In the regular season, Oklahoma defeated TCU, 38–20. In a rematch between the two teams, Oklahoma won the Big 12 Championship over TCU, 41–17, for its 47th conference title.

== Teams ==
The 2018 Championship game was contested by Oklahoma and Texas. Texas defeated Oklahoma 48–45 in their regular season match-up in Dallas.

== Game summary ==
2018 Big 12 Championship Game

Quarter	1	2	3	4	Total
No. 14 Texas	7	7	13	0	27
No. 5 Oklahoma	3	17	7	12	39

at AT&T Stadium • Arlington, Texas

- Date: December 1, 2018
- Game time: 11:00 a.m. CST
- Game weather: None (retractable roof closed)
- Game attendance: 83,114
- Referee: Reggie Smith
- TV announcers (ABC): Sean McDonough (play-by-play), Todd Blackledge (analyst), Holly Rowe (sideline)

Game information

First quarter
Second quarter
Third quarter
Fourth quarter

=== Statistics ===
Statistics	TEX	OKLA
First downs	23	29
Plays–yards	69–437	74–508
Rushes–yards	32–88	40–129
Passing yards	349	379
Passing: comp–att–int	25–37–1	25–34–0
Turnovers		
Time of possession	28:00	32:00

Team	Category	Player	Statistics
Texas	Passing	Sam Ehlinger	25/36, 349 yards, 2 TD, INT
Texas	Rushing	Sam Ehlinger	14 carries, 42 yards, TD
Texas	Receiving	Collin Johnson	8 receptions, 177 yards, TD
Oklahoma	Passing	Kyler Murray	25/34, 379 yards, 3 TD
Oklahoma	Rushing	Trey Sermon	18 carries, 65 yards, TD
Oklahoma	Receiving	CeeDee Lamb	6 receptions, 167 yards, TD

== See also ==
- List of Big 12 Conference football champions
