= Tom Herman =

American football coach (born 1975)

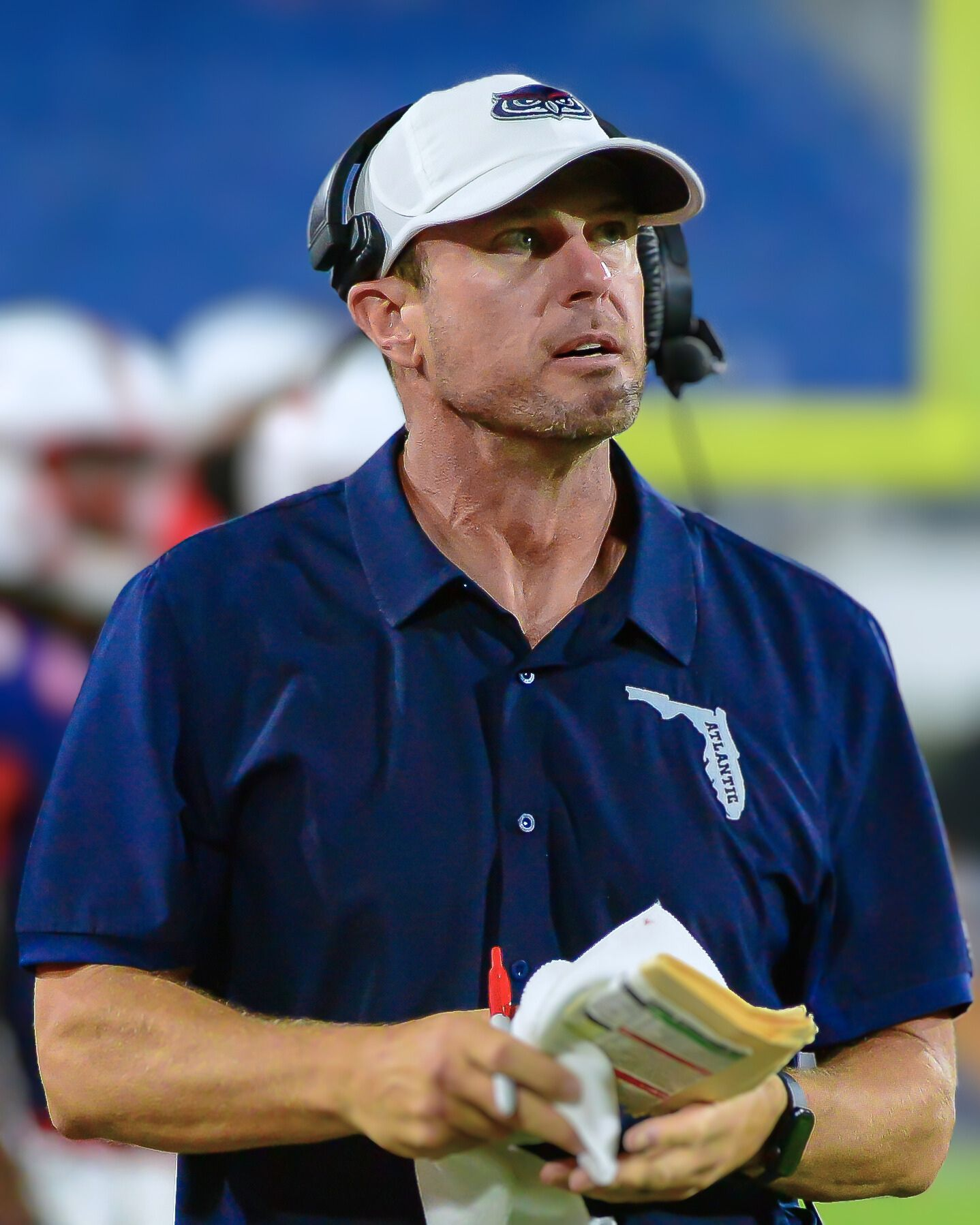
- Herman with Florida Atlantic in 2024

Current position
- Team: Florida State
- Conference: ACC

Biographical details
- Born: June 2, 1975 (age 51); Cincinnati, Ohio, U.S.
- Education: Cal Lutheran

Playing career
- 1993–1996: Cal Lutheran
- Position: Wide receiver

Coaching career (HC unless noted)
- 1998: Texas Lutheran (WR)
- 1999–2000: Texas (GA)
- 2001–2004: Sam Houston State (WR/ST)
- 2005–2006: Texas State (OC/QB)
- 2007–2008: Rice (OC/QB)
- 2009–2011: Iowa State (OC/QB)
- 2012–2014: Ohio State (OC/QB)
- 2015–2016: Houston
- 2017–2020: Texas
- 2021: Chicago Bears (offensive analyst)
- 2023–2024: Florida Atlantic
- 2026–present: Florida State (Assistant to the Head Coach)

Head coaching record
- Overall: 60–36
- Bowls: 5–0

Accomplishments and honors

Championships
- As a head coach: 1 AAC (2015); 1 AAC West Division (2015); As an assistant coach: 1 National (2014)

Awards
- Broyles Award (2014); FWAA First-Year Coach of the Year (2015); AAC Coach of the Year (2015)

Thomas Herman III (born June 2, 1975) is an American college football coach who is the Assistant Head Coach of the Florida State Seminoles. He previously served as the head coach for the Florida Atlantic Owls. He was the head football coach for the Texas Longhorns from 2017 to 2020 and head football coach for the Houston Cougars from 2015 to 2016.

== Early life ==
An only child, Herman was born in Cincinnati, Ohio and has family there. From age six he was raised in Simi Valley, California. He earned his B.S. in Business Administration from California Lutheran University in 1997, where he was a Presidential Scholarship recipient and cum laude graduate. At California Lutheran he was an All-Southern California Athletic Conference wide receiver. He also earned a master's degree from the University of Texas at Austin.

== Coaching career ==
=== Early coaching career ===
Herman began his coaching career in 1998 at Texas Lutheran as a receivers coach. He then took a position in 1999 at the University of Texas at Austin as a graduate assistant under the mentorship of Greg Davis. During his tenure at Texas, Herman worked with the offensive line, which included All-American Leonard Davis.

=== Sam Houston State ===
In 2004, they finished 11–3 and advanced to the Division I-AA championship's semifinals. The Bearkats' offense was ranked second nationally in passing offense, averaging 358.5 yards, while the Bearkats' 471 yards of total offense ranked fifth among Division I-AA schools.

=== Texas State ===
After four seasons at Sam Houston State, Herman joined Texas State as the offensive coordinator in 2005. During his two seasons at Texas State his squad led the Southland Conference in total offense and the 2005 team ranked eighth nationally in scoring. The Bobcats went on to make a deep run in the NCAA in the team's first ever Division I-AA appearance, while Barrick Nealy finished fifth in the voting for the Walter Payton Award (top offensive player in Division I-AA).

=== Rice ===
In 2007, Herman then followed head coach David Bailiff from Texas State to form the new coaching staff at Rice. Rice ranked in the Top 10 nationally in 2008 in passing offense (5th; 327.8), scoring offense (T8th; 41.6) and total offense (10th; 472.3). Two Rice receivers had more than 1,300 yards receiving that year, tight end James Casey had 111 catches and quarterback Chase Clement was the Conference USA MVP.

=== Iowa State ===
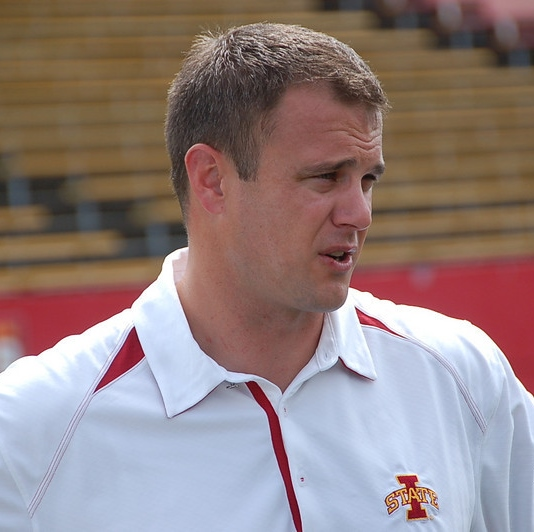
Herman at Iowa State

After building one of the nation's most prolific offenses at Rice, Herman joined Iowa State as offensive coordinator and quarterbacks coach. Iowa State's 52 points in a win over Texas Tech marked the most points put up by the Cyclones against a conference opponent in 38 years. Iowa State quarterback Austen Arnaud ended his career as the Cyclones No. 2 all-time leading passer with 6,777 yards and 42 touchdown passes. His 8,044 yards of total offense is the second-best total in school history. Running back Alexander Robinson finished his Iowa State career as the Cyclones' fourth all-time leading rusher with 3,309 yards.

=== Ohio State ===
On December 9, 2011, Urban Meyer selected Herman as his offensive coordinator and quarterbacks coach for the Buckeyes. On December 9, 2014, after leading Ohio State's fourth ranked offense to their first national title since 2002, while playing two backup quarterbacks, Herman was awarded the Broyles Award, given annually to the nation's top assistant coach.

=== Houston ===
On December 15, 2014, Herman was hired by Houston as its new head football coach. In the 2015 season, he led his 21st-ranked team to an 11–1 start and the Western Division title in the American Athletic Conference. They won their first American Athletic Conference title by defeating the Temple Owls 24–13.

On December 31, 2015, Herman led the 14th-ranked Cougars to a 38–24 victory over the 9th-ranked Florida State Seminoles at the Peach Bowl. The Cougars had not beaten an AP top-10 team in a bowl game since 1979. After the game, Herman stated that the Cougars had completed their return to national relevancy. The Cougars ended the season 13–1 and ranked #8 in both the AP and Coaches Polls, their highest post-season ranking since 1979.

In 2016, Herman's second season with Houston, the Cougars slipped to a 9–3 regular-season record. Among their nine wins were victories over Oklahoma and Louisville, each of which was ranked #3 in the AP Poll at the time Houston faced them.

Houston's overall record in its two seasons under Herman was 22–4, which included unblemished marks in home games at TDECU Stadium (14–0), in games versus teams ranked in the AP Poll (6–0), and in games versus teams from Power Five conferences (5–0). Herman's success with Houston brought him significant attention from the media and from multiple Power Five football programs throughout the season, which culminated in his hiring as the head coach of the Texas Longhorns immediately following Houston's final regular-season contest of 2016.

=== Texas ===
On November 27, 2016, Herman was hired as the new head coach at Texas. He signed a five-year contract with a base salary of $5 million per year. Texas would go 7–6 in Herman's first season at the helm, which culminated in a 33–16 victory over Missouri in the 2017 Texas Bowl.

In his second season at the helm, Herman led Texas to a 9–3 regular season record, including a 7–2 record in conference play, and a berth in the Big 12 Championship Game, which was the program's first since 2009. Texas defeated Georgia in the Sugar Bowl, which clinched the first 10-win season for the Longhorns since 2009. Expectations were high for Herman's third season in 2019, but Texas posted a disappointing 7–5 regular season record. Texas defeated No. 11-ranked Utah in the 2019 Alamo Bowl by a final score of 38–10 to end the season on a high note. In 2020, the team again fell somewhat short of expectations, going 7–3, and Herman endured growing criticism amongst the fanbase relating to his handling of off-field issues, most notably a controversy relating to some players refusing to participate or even stay for the post-game singing of the school's alma mater, "The Eyes of Texas," due to its origin being traced to minstrelsy. Despite ending the season ranked (20th in the CFP) and having amassed four bowl wins in four seasons, Texas fired Herman on January 2, 2021.

=== Chicago Bears ===
Herman joined the Chicago Bears coaching staff in 2021 as an offensive analyst and special projects coach. He was not retained by new head coach Matt Eberflus for the 2022 season.

=== Florida Atlantic ===
On December 1, 2022, Florida Atlantic announced Tom Herman as their next head coach. Herman replaced Willie Taggart, who was fired after three years with the Owls.

Herman was fired during his second season on November 18, 2024, after starting the season 0–6 in conference play and 2–8 overall. In just under 2 full seasons at FAU, his overall record was 6–16, and 3–11 in conference play.

=== Florida State ===
On July 13, 2026, it was announced that Herman would be joining the Florida State coaching staff.

== Personal life ==
Herman is a member of Mensa International. He and his wife, Michelle, have a daughter and two sons.

== Media work ==
During college Herman interned and worked in various positions in the sports broadcasting industry. He worked in television as a sports production assistant in Oxnard, California, a highlight coordinator for Fox-TV in Los Angeles and a producer/production assistant at XTRA Sports Radio in Los Angeles.

In 2021, Herman worked as an in-game color commentator for CBS Sports Networks' college football coverage, being paired most often with Carter Blackburn.

== Head coaching record ==
Year	Team	Overall	Conference	Standing	Bowl/playoffs	Coaches^{#}	AP^{°}
Houston Cougars (American Athletic Conference) (2015–2016)
2015	Houston	13–1	7–1	T–1st (West)	W Peach^{†}	8	8
2016	Houston	9–3	5–3	T–3rd (West)	Las Vegas (Note: Herman left for Texas after the regular season; new head coach Major Applewhite coached the Cougars against San Diego State in the Las Vegas Bowl.)		
Houston:		22–4	12–4				
Texas Longhorns (Big 12 Conference) (2017–2020)
2017	Texas	7–6	5–4	T–4th	W Texas		
2018	Texas	10–4	7–2	2nd	W Sugar^{†}	9	9
2019	Texas	8–5	5–4	T–3rd	W Alamo		25
2020	Texas	7–3	5–3	3rd	W Alamo	20	19
Texas:		32–18	22–13				
Florida Atlantic Owls (American Athletic Conference) (2023–2024)
2023	Florida Atlantic	4–8	3–5	T–8th			
2024	Florida Atlantic	2–8	0–6	(Note: Herman was fired after 10 games.)			
Florida Atlantic:		6–16	3–9				
Total:		60–36					
National championship Conference title Conference division title or championship game berth
^{†}Indicates CFP / New Years' Six bowl.; ^{#}Rankings from final Coaches Poll.; ^{°}Rankings from final AP Poll.
