= 2019 New York Jets season =

60th season in franchise history

- Owner: Woody & Christopher Johnson
- General manager: Joe Douglas
- Head coach: Adam Gase
- Home stadium: MetLife Stadium

Results
- Record: 7–9
- Division place: 3rd AFC East
- Playoffs: Did not qualify
- All-Pros: S Jamal Adams (1st team)
- Pro Bowlers: S Jamal Adams

Uniform
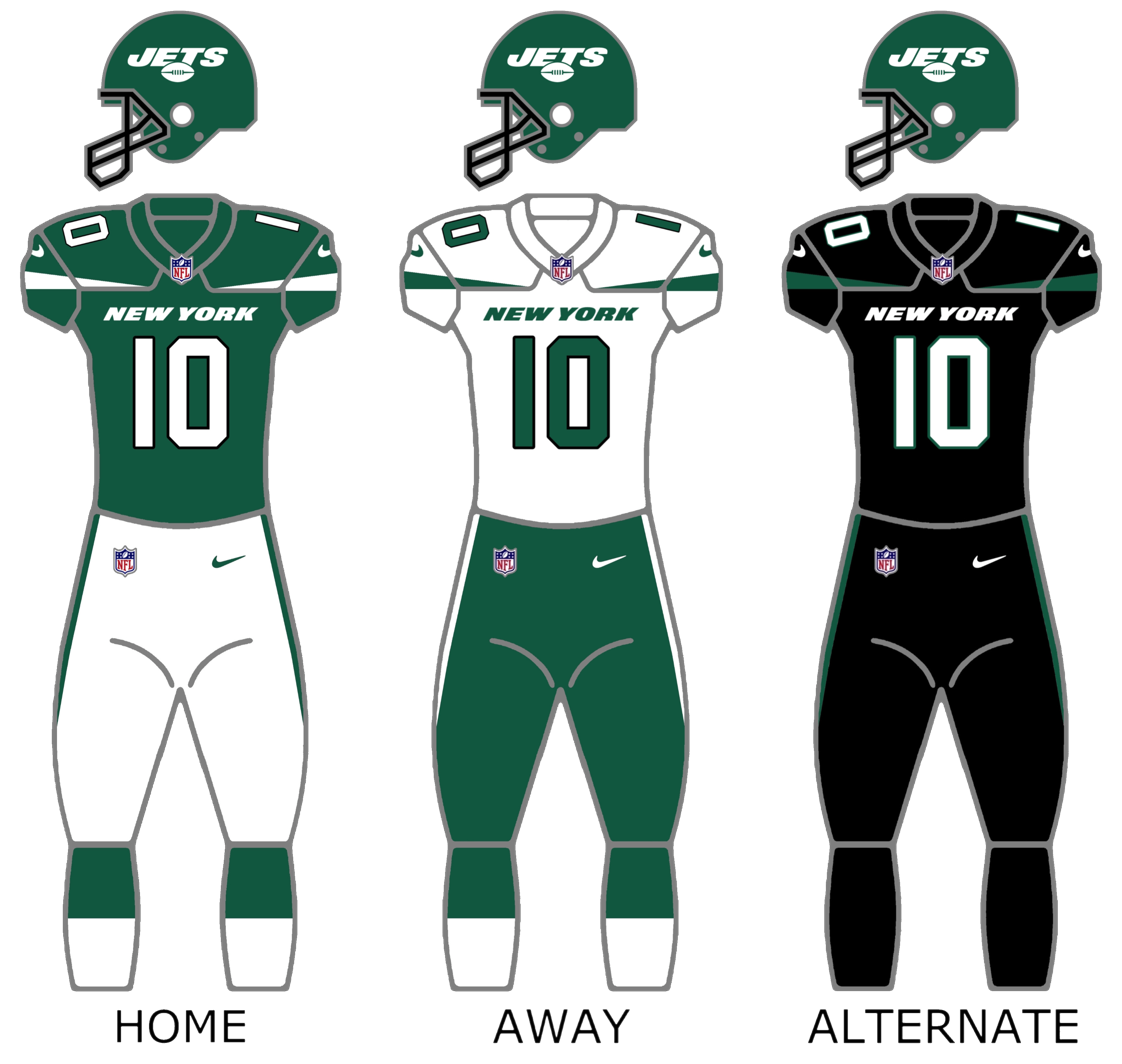

The 2019 season was the New York Jets' 50th in the National Football League (NFL), their 60th overall in professional football, their 10th playing home games at MetLife Stadium, their first under general manager Joe Douglas and their first under head coach Adam Gase. This year the team began featuring a new logo and uniform for the first time since 1998. With this new uniform design, the Jets began going for a modern appearance, tweaking the shade of green and adding a black accent similar to what the Arizona Cardinals did in 2005.

The Jets improved on their 4–12 record from 2018 but missed the playoffs for the ninth consecutive season after wins by the Titans and Steelers in Week 14. The team started the season 1–7 (their worst start in 5 years), but rallied to win six of their last eight, finishing the year at 7–9.

== Offseason ==
On May 15, 2019, the Jets fired general manager Mike Maccagnan after he had already completed almost all the major offseason roster milestones for the 2019 season (including signing big ticket free agents linebacker C.J. Mosley, running back Le'Veon Bell and cornerback Brian Poole, as well as selecting all of the picks in the 2019 NFL Draft). Adam Gase served as interim GM until Joe Douglas was hired to be permanent GM for the 2019 season.

== Draft ==
2019 New York Jets Draft
Round	Selection	Player	Position	College
1	3	Quinnen Williams	Defensive end	Alabama
3	68	Jachai Polite	Outside linebacker	Florida
3	92	Chuma Edoga	Offensive tackle	USC
4	121	Trevon Wesco	Tight end	West Virginia
5	157	Blake Cashman	Linebacker	Minnesota
6	195	Blessuan Austin	Cornerback	Rutgers

Notes

- The Jets traded their second-round selection (No. 34 overall), along with their 2018 first- and two second-round selections to the Indianapolis Colts in exchange for the Colts' 2018 first-round selection.
- The Jets acquired an additional third-round selection in a trade that sent quarterback Teddy Bridgewater and their sixth-round selection to the New Orleans Saints.
- The Jets traded their fifth-round selection to the Oakland Raiders in exchange for offensive guard Kelechi Osemele and the Chicago Bears' 2019 6th round draft pick.
- Minnesota traded a third-round selection (92nd) to the Jets in exchange for the Jets' third- and seventh-round selections (93rd and 217th).
- The Jets traded their fourth-round selection (105th) to the New Orleans Saints in exchange for their fourth- and fifth-round selections (116th and 168th).
- The Jets traded their fourth- and fifth-round selection (116th and 168th) to the Tennessee Titans in exchange for their fourth- and fifth-round selection (121st and 157th).

=== Undrafted free agents ===
Player	Position	College	Date signed
Greg Dortch	WR	Wake Forest	April 27, 2019
John Battle	S	LSU	April 27, 2019
Kyron Brown	CB	Akron	April 27, 2019
Santos Ramirez	S	Arkansas	April 27, 2019
Jalin Moore	RB	Appalachian State	April 27, 2019
Wyatt Miller	OT	UCF	April 27, 2019
Malik Reed	DE	Nevada	April 27, 2019
Trevon Sanders	DE	Troy	April 27, 2019
Toa Lobendahn	OL	USC	April 27, 2019
Jabril Frazier	DE	Boise State	April 27, 2019
Jeff Allison	LB	Fresno State	April 27, 2019
Justin Alexander	DE	Incarnate Word	April 27, 2019
Kyle Phillips	DE	Tennessee	April 27, 2019
Jamey Mosley	LB	Alabama	April 27, 2019
Fred Jones	DE	Florida State	April 27, 2019

== Staff ==
2019 New York Jets staff
Front office: Owner – Woody Johnson; Chairman/CEO – Christopher Johnson; President – Hymie Elhai; General manager – Joe Douglas; Assistant general manager – Rex Hogan; Senior advisor – Neil Glat; Senior director, football administration – Dave Socie; Director of player personnel – Chad Alexander; Player personnel executive – Rich Snead and Zach Truty; College scouting – Jon Carr; Head coaches: Head coach – Adam Gase; Assistant head coach/offense/wide receivers – Shawn Jefferson; Assistant head coach/defense/inside linebackers – Frank Bush; Offensive coaches: Offensive coordinator/quarterbacks – Dowell Loggains; Running backs – Jim Bob Cooter; Tight ends – John Dunn; Offensive line – Frank Pollack; Assistant offensive line – Derek Frazier; Offensive assistant – Bo Hardegree, Chris Kragthorpe, and Hines Ward	Defensive coaches: Defensive coordinator – Gregg Williams; Defensive line – Andre Carter; Senior defensive assistant/outside linebackers – Joe Vitt; Passing game coordinator/defensive backs – Dennard Wilson; Assistant defensive backs – Steve Jackson; Defensive assistant – Robby Brown, Blake Williams, and Eric Sanders; Special teams coaches: Special teams coordinator – Brant Boyer; Assistant special teams – Jeff Hammerschmidt; Strength and conditioning: Head strength and conditioning – Justus Galac; Assistant strength and conditioning – Aaron McLaurin and Joe Giacobbe

== Final roster ==
2019 New York Jets roster
Quarterbacks (QB): 14 Sam Darnold; 3 David Fales; Running backs (RB): 36 Josh Adams; 26 Le'Veon Bell; 38 Kenneth Dixon; 88 Ty Montgomery; 29 Bilal Powell; Wide receivers (WR): 11 Robby Anderson; 10 Braxton Berrios; 82 Jamison Crowder; 83 Josh Malone; 17 Vyncint Smith; 18 Demaryius Thomas; Tight ends (TE): 87 Daniel Brown; 43 Ross Travis; 85 Trevon Wesco	Offensive linemen (OL): 68 Kelvin Beachum T; 70 Ben Braden G; 78 Jonotthan Harrison C; 63 Leo Koloamatangi C; 69 Conor McDermott T; 79 Brent Qvale G; 72 Brandon Shell T; Defensive linemen (DL): 96 Henry Anderson DE; 94 Folorunso Fatukasi NT; 99 Steve McLendon NT; 98 Kyle Phillips DE; 97 Nathan Shepherd DE; 95 Quinnen Williams DE; 60 Jordan Willis DE	Linebackers (LB): 93 Tarell Basham OLB; 49 B. J. Bello ILB; 58 James Burgess ILB; 51 Brandon Copeland OLB; 46 Neville Hewitt ILB; 48 Jordan Jenkins OLB; 44 Harvey Langi OLB; 50 Frankie Luvu OLB; 40 Paul Worrilow ILB; Defensive backs (DB): 33 Jamal Adams SS; 31 Blessuan Austin CB; 37 Maurice Canady CB; 32 Blake Countess SS; 41 Matthias Farley FS; 21 Nate Hairston CB; 39 Bennett Jackson SS; 23 Arthur Maulet CB; 20 Marcus Maye FS; 34 Brian Poole CB; 27 Darryl Roberts CB; Special teams (ST): 9 Sam Ficken K; 4 Lac Edwards P; 42 Thomas Hennessy LS	Practice squad: 52 Ahmad Gooden OLB; 86 Keon Hatcher WR; 91 Bronson Kaufusi OLB; 65 Corbin Kaufusi DE; 64 Brad Lundblade C; 61 Jimmy Murray C; 43 Wyatt Ray OLB; 5 Mike White QB; Reserve: 15 Josh Bellamy WR (IR); 35 Kyron Brown CB (IR); 25 Trenton Cannon RB (IR); 53 Blake Cashman ILB (IR); 77 Tom Compton G (IR); 81 Quincy Enunwa WR (IR); 56 John Franklin-Myers DE (IR); 84 Ryan Griffin TE (IR); 89 Chris Herndon TE (IR); 22 Trumaine Johnson CB (IR); 55 Ryan Kalil C (IR); 71 Alex Lewis G (IR); 47 Albert McClellan ILB (IR); 45 Rontez Miles SS (IR); 30 Jalin Moore RB (NF-Inj.); 57 C. J. Mosley ILB (IR); 19 Trevor Siemian QB (IR); 16 Jeff Smith WR (IR); 90 Charles Tapper DE (NF-Inj.); 54 Avery Williamson ILB (IR); 67 Brian Winters G (IR); 75 Chuma Edoga T (IR); Rookies in italics 53 active, 22 reserve, 8 practice squad

== Preseason ==
Week	Date	Opponent	Result	Record	Venue	Recap
1	August 8	at New York Giants	L 22–31	0–1	MetLife Stadium	Recap
2	August 15	at Atlanta Falcons	W 22–10	1–1	Mercedes-Benz Stadium	Recap
3	August 24	New Orleans Saints	L 13–28	1–2	MetLife Stadium	Recap
4	August 29	Philadelphia Eagles	W 6–0	2–2	MetLife Stadium	Recap

== Regular season ==
=== Schedule ===
The Jets did not travel outside of the Eastern Time Zone during the 2019 season—preseason or regular season.

Week	Date	Opponent	Result	Record	Venue	Recap
1	September 8	**Buffalo Bills**	**L** 16–17	0–1	MetLife Stadium	Recap
2	September 16	Cleveland Browns	**L** 3–23	0–2	MetLife Stadium	Recap
3	September 22	at **New England Patriots**	**L** 14–30	0–3	Gillette Stadium	Recap
4	Bye					
5	October 6	at Philadelphia Eagles	**L** 6–31	0–4	Lincoln Financial Field	Recap
6	October 13	Dallas Cowboys	**W** 24–22	1–4	MetLife Stadium	Recap
7	October 21	**New England Patriots**	**L** 0–33	1–5	MetLife Stadium	Recap
8	October 27	at Jacksonville Jaguars	**L** 15–29	1–6	TIAA Bank Field	Recap
9	November 3	at **Miami Dolphins**	**L** 18–26	1–7	Hard Rock Stadium	Recap
10	November 10	New York Giants	**W** 34–27	2–7	MetLife Stadium	Recap
11	November 17	at Washington Redskins	**W** 34–17	3–7	FedEx Field	Recap
12	November 24	Oakland Raiders	**W** 34–3	4–7	MetLife Stadium	Recap
13	December 1	at Cincinnati Bengals	**L** 6–22	4–8	Paul Brown Stadium	Recap
14	December 8	**Miami Dolphins**	**W** 22–21	5–8	MetLife Stadium	Recap
15	December 12	at Baltimore Ravens	**L** 21–42	5–9	M&T Bank Stadium	Recap
16	December 22	Pittsburgh Steelers	**W** 16–10	6–9	MetLife Stadium	Recap
17	December 29	at **Buffalo Bills**	**W** 13–6	7–9	New Era Field	Recap

Note: Intra-division opponents are in bold text.

=== Game summaries ===
==== Week 1: vs. Buffalo Bills ====
Week One: Buffalo Bills at New York Jets – Game summary

Quarter	1	2	3	4	Total
**Bills**	0	0	3	14	**17**
Jets	6	0	10	0	**16**

at MetLife Stadium, East Rutherford, New Jersey

- Date: September 8
- Game time: 1:00 p.m. EDT
- Game weather: Mostly sunny, 77 °F (25 °C)
- Game attendance: 78,523
- Referee: Clay Martin
- TV announcers (CBS): Kevin Harlan, Rich Gannon and Amanda Balionis
- Recap, Game Book

Game information

**First quarter**

- NYJ – C. J. Mosley 17-yard interception return (kick failed, hit left upright), 10:34. Jets 6–0.

**Second quarter**

- No scoring plays.

**Third quarter**

- NYJ – Frank Gore tackled in the end zone by Brian Poole and Jordan Jenkins for a safety, 11:52. Jets 8–0.
- NYJ – Le'Veon Bell 9-yard pass from Sam Darnold (Sam Darnold–Le'Veon Bell pass), 7:01. Jets 16–0. **Drive: 9 plays, 60 yards, 4:51.**
- BUF – Stephen Hauschka 43-yard field goal, 3:48. Jets 16–3. **Drive: 9 plays, 50 yards, 3:13.**

**Fourth quarter**

- BUF – Josh Allen 3-yard run (Stephen Hauschka kick), 10:21. Jets 16–10. **Drive: 8 plays, 85 yards, 4:33.**
- BUF – John Brown 38-yard pass from Josh Allen (Stephen Hauschka kick), 3:00. Bills 17–16. **Drive: 8 plays, 80 yards, 2:55.**

**Top passers**

- BUF – Josh Allen – 24/37, 254 yards, TD, 2 INT
- NYJ – Sam Darnold – 28/41, 175 yards, TD

**Top rushers**

- BUF – Devin Singletary – 4 rushes, 70 yards
- NYJ – Le'Veon Bell – 17 rushes, 60 yards

**Top receivers**

- BUF – John Brown – 7 receptions, 123 yards, TD
- NYJ – Jamison Crowder – 14 receptions, 99 yards

The Jets forced four turnovers, culminating with a 16–0 lead in the third quarter. However, Bills QB Josh Allen engineered three consecutive scoring drives after Jets LB C. J. Mosley left the game with a groin injury, with the Jets offense unable to respond. In addition, kicker Kaare Vedvik missed both of his kicks, a field goal and an extra point. With the loss, the Jets not only opened the season at 0–1, but became the first team in six years to squander a lead of at least 16 points with a plus-three turnover margin.

==== Week 2: vs. Cleveland Browns ====
Week Two: Cleveland Browns at New York Jets – Game summary

Quarter	1	2	3	4	Total
**Browns**	6	10	7	0	**23**
Jets	0	3	0	0	**3**

at MetLife Stadium, East Rutherford, New Jersey

- Date: September 16
- Game time: 8:15 p.m. EDT
- Game weather: Cloudy, 72 °F (22 °C)
- Game attendance: 78,523
- Referee: Alex Kemp
- TV announcers (ESPN): Joe Tessitore, Booger McFarland, Lisa Salters and John Parry
- Recap, Game Book

Game information

**First quarter**

- CLE – Austin Seibert 23-yard field goal, 10:27. Browns 3–0. **Drive: 11 plays, 76 yards, 4:33.**
- CLE – Austin Seibert 48-yard field goal, 6:15. Browns 6–0. **Drive: 6 plays, 22 yards, 2:32.**

**Second quarter**

- CLE – Nick Chubb 19-yard run (Austin Seibert kick), 10:16. Browns 13–0. **Drive: 5 plays, 53 yards, 3:07.**
- NYJ – Sam Ficken 46-yard field goal, 2:56. Browns 13–3. **Drive: 11 plays, 47 yards, 7:20.**
- CLE – Austin Seibert 43-yard field goal, 0:00. Browns 16–3. **Drive: 5 plays, 15 yards, 0:35.**

**Third quarter**

- CLE – Odell Beckham Jr. 89-yard pass from Baker Mayfield (Austin Seibert kick), 3:32. Browns 23–3. **Drive: 1 play, 89 yards, 0:11.**

**Fourth quarter**

- No scoring plays.

**Top passers**

- CLE – Baker Mayfield – 19/35, 325 yards, TD, INT
- NYJ – Luke Falk – 20/25, 198 yards

**Top rushers**

- CLE – Nick Chubb – 18 rushes, 62 yards, TD
- NYJ – Le'Veon Bell – 21 rushes, 68 yards

**Top receivers**

- CLE – Odell Beckham Jr. – 6 receptions, 161 yards, TD
- NYJ – Robby Anderson – 4 receptions, 81 yards

The Jets used their Stealth black alternate uniforms for the first time ever on Monday Night Football against the Browns. Starting quarterback Sam Darnold was ruled out after coming down with infectious mononucleosis, with backup Trevor Siemian slated to start for the Jets in a rematch of the first Monday Night Football game ever played. Siemian was knocked out of the game after suffering an ankle injury and would later be placed on injured reserve, forcing third-string quarterback Luke Falk into action. After a low-scoring first quarter, the Browns pulled away with a Nick Chubb touchdown run and a field goal in the second quarter, and an 89-yard touchdown reception by Odell Beckham Jr. in the third, though newly signed kicker Sam Ficken successfully made a field goal attempt for the Jets. With the 23–3 loss, the Jets fell to 0–2.

This was also superstar wide receiver Odell Beckham Jr.’s first return to Metlife Stadium. Beckham played for the New York Giants from 2014 to the 2018 NFL season.

==== Week 3: at New England Patriots ====
Week Three: New York Jets at New England Patriots – Game summary

Quarter	1	2	3	4	Total
Jets	0	0	7	7	**14**
**Patriots**	13	7	10	0	**30**

at Gillette Stadium, Foxborough, Massachusetts

- Date: September 22
- Game time: 1:00 p.m. EDT
- Game weather: Sunny and warm, 81 °F (27 °C)
- Game attendance: 65,878
- Referee: Carl Cheffers
- TV announcers (CBS): Kevin Harlan, Rich Gannon and Dana Jacobson
- Recap, Game Book

Game information

**First quarter**

- NE – Sony Michel 5-yard run (kick failed, wide right), 7:55. Patriots 6–0. **Drive: 9 plays, 88 yards, 4:31.**
- NE – Phillip Dorsett 25-yard pass from Tom Brady (Stephen Gostkowski kick), 4:25. Patriots 13–0. **Drive: 3 plays, 45 yards, 1:22.**

**Second quarter**

- NE – Julian Edelman 3-yard pass from Tom Brady (Stephen Gostkowski kick), 13:34. Patriots 20–0. **Drive: 10 plays, 59 yards, 4:24.**

**Third quarter**

- NE – Stephen Gostkowski 37-yard field goal, 8:49. Patriots 23–0. **Drive: 5 plays, −2 yards, 2:47.**
- NE – Rex Burkhead 2-yard run (Stephen Gostkowski kick), 3:07. Patriots 30–0. **Drive: 10 plays, 60 yards, 4:40.**
- NYJ – Arthur Maulet fumble recovery in the end zone (Sam Ficken kick), 0:21. Patriots 30–7.

**Fourth quarter**

- NYJ – Jamal Adams 61-yard interception return (Sam Ficken kick), 6:23. Patriots 30–14.

**Top passers**

- NYJ – Luke Falk – 12/22, 98 yards, INT
- NE – Tom Brady – 28/42, 306 yards, 2 TD

**Top rushers**

- NYJ – Le'Veon Bell – 18 rushes, 35 yards
- NE – Rex Burkhead – 11 rushes, 47 yards, TD

**Top receivers**

- NYJ – Braxton Berrios – 2 receptions, 29 yards
- NE – Josh Gordon – 6 receptions, 83 yards

Against archrival New England, the Luke Falk-led Jets offense only mustered 105 total yards and were unable to score as the Patriots dominated the game, though the Jets avoided a shutout with a special teams touchdown by Arthur Maulet and a pick six by CB Jamal Adams, who intercepted Patriots backup quarterback Jarrett Stidham as Tom Brady and other starters were resting at that point. With the loss, the Jets enter their bye week at 0–3.

==== Week 5: at Philadelphia Eagles ====
Week Five: New York Jets at Philadelphia Eagles – Game summary

Quarter	1	2	3	4	Total
Jets	0	0	0	6	**6**
**Eagles**	14	7	3	7	**31**

at Lincoln Financial Field, Philadelphia, Pennsylvania

- Date: October 6
- Game time: 1:00 p.m. EDT
- Game weather: Cloudy, 68 °F (20 °C)
- Game attendance: 69,796
- Referee: Adrian Hill
- TV announcers (CBS): Kevin Harlan, Rich Gannon and Jay Feely
- Recap, Game Book

Game information

**First quarter**

- PHI – Jordan Howard 1-yard run (Jake Elliott kick), 7:44. Eagles 7–0. **Drive: 9 plays, 53 yards, 5:11.**
- PHI – Nathan Gerry 51-yard interception return (Jake Elliott kick), 5:04. Eagles 14–0.

**Second quarter**

- PHI – Zach Ertz 11-yard pass from Carson Wentz (Jake Elliott kick), 0:34. Eagles 21–0. **Drive: 7 plays, 42 yards, 1:28.**

**Third quarter**

- PHI – Jake Elliott 28-yard field goal, 1:26. Eagles 24–0. **Drive: 12 plays, 77 yards, 7:09.**

**Fourth quarter**

- NYJ – Vyncint Smith 19-yard run (pass failed), 14:32. Eagles 24–6. **Drive: 1 play, 19 yards, 0:08.**
- PHI – Orlando Scandrick 44-yard fumble return (Jake Elliott kick), 7:39. Eagles 31–6.

**Top passers**

- NYJ – Luke Falk – 15/26, 120 yards, 2 INT
- PHI – Carson Wentz – 17/29, 189 yards, TD

**Top rushers**

- NYJ – Le'Veon Bell – 15 rushes, 43 yards
- PHI – Jordan Howard – 13 rushes, 62 yards, TD

**Top receivers**

- NYJ – Demaryius Thomas – 4 receptions, 47 yards
- PHI – Zach Ertz – 5 receptions, 57 yards, TD

The Jets visited Philadelphia seeking their first ever win against the Philadelphia Eagles, against whom they were 0–10 in the all-time series heading into their Week 5 matchup. They could not get anything going offensively until it was too late in a 31–6 loss. Their only score came in the fourth quarter on a 19-yard run by Vyncint Smith after a muffed punt. New York dropped to 0–4 on the season and 0–11 all-time against Philadelphia with the crushing loss.

==== Week 6: vs. Dallas Cowboys ====
Week Six: Dallas Cowboys at New York Jets – Game summary

Quarter	1	2	3	4	Total
Cowboys	0	6	3	13	**22**
**Jets**	7	14	0	3	**24**

at MetLife Stadium, East Rutherford, New Jersey

- Date: October 13
- Game time: 4:25 p.m. EDT
- Game weather: Fair, 66 °F (19 °C)
- Game attendance: 78,523
- Referee: Brad Rogers
- TV announcers (CBS): Jim Nantz, Tony Romo and Tracy Wolfson
- Recap, Game Book

Game information

**First quarter**

- NYJ – Le'Veon Bell 2-yard run (Sam Ficken kick), 3:24. Jets 7–0. **Drive: 14 plays, 83 yards, 7:54.**

**Second quarter**

- DAL – Brett Maher 50-yard field goal, 14:56. Jets 7–3. **Drive: 8 plays, 43 yards, 3:28.**
- NYJ – Robby Anderson 92-yard pass from Sam Darnold (Sam Ficken kick), 3:34. Jets 14–3. **Drive: 1 play, 92 yards, 0:12.**
- NYJ – Ryan Griffin 5-yard pass from Sam Darnold (Sam Ficken kick), 0:27. Jets 21–3. **Drive: 6 plays, 65 yards, 1:33.**
- DAL – Brett Maher 62-yard field goal, 0:00. Jets 21–6. **Drive: 5 plays, 31 yards, 0:27.**

**Third quarter**

- DAL – Brett Maher 32-yard field goal, 7:50. Jets 21–9. **Drive: 14 plays, 61 yards, 7:10.**

**Fourth quarter**

- DAL – Ezekiel Elliott 5-yard run (Brett Maher kick), 6:30. Jets 21–16. **Drive: 11 plays, 84 yards, 4:51.**
- NYJ – Sam Ficken 38-yard field goal, 3:24. Jets 24–16. **Drive: 7 plays, 57 yards, 3:06.**
- DAL – Dak Prescott 4-yard run (pass failed), 0:43. Jets 24–22. **Drive: 10 plays, 75 yards, 2:41.**

**Top passers**

- DAL – Dak Prescott – 28/40, 277 yards
- NYJ – Sam Darnold – 23/32, 338 yards, 2 TD, INT

**Top rushers**

- DAL – Ezekiel Elliott – 28 rushes, 105 yards, TD
- NYJ – Le'Veon Bell – 14 rushes, 50 yards, TD

**Top receivers**

- DAL – Tavon Austin – 5 receptions, 64 yards
- NYJ – Robby Anderson – 5 receptions, 125 yards, TD

Making his first start after recovering from illness, Sam Darnold passed for over 330 yards and two touchdowns as the Jets enjoyed their most effective offensive performance of the year, defeating the visiting Cowboys for their first win in 2019. Their win streak against the Dallas Cowboys continued to 3, as the Cowboys had not beat the Jets since 2007. With the win, the Jets were 1–4.

==== Week 7: vs. New England Patriots ====
Week Seven: New England Patriots at New York Jets – Game summary

Quarter	1	2	3	4	Total
**Patriots**	17	7	2	7	**33**
Jets	0	0	0	0	**0**

at MetLife Stadium, East Rutherford, New Jersey

- Date: October 21
- Game time: 8:15 p.m. EDT
- Game weather: Mostly clear, 58 °F (14 °C)
- Game attendance: 78,523
- Referee: Shawn Hochuli
- TV announcers (ESPN): Joe Tessitore, Booger McFarland, Lisa Salters and John Parry
- Recap, Game Book

Game information

**First quarter**

- NE – Sony Michel 3-yard run (Mike Nugent kick), 6:13. Patriots 7–0. **Drive: 16 plays, 78 yards, 8:47.**
- NE – Mike Nugent 34-yard field goal, 3:49. Patriots 10–0. **Drive: 4 plays, −4 yards, 1:27.**
- NE – Phillip Dorsett 26-yard pass from Tom Brady (Mike Nugent kick), 0:09. Patriots 17–0. **Drive: 7 plays, 67 yards, 2:20.**

**Second quarter**

- NE – Sony Michel 1-yard run (Mike Nugent kick), 9:18. Patriots 24–0. **Drive: 9 plays, 38 yards, 4:53.**

**Third quarter**

- NE – Ryan Kalil fumbled, ball out of bounds in end zone for Safety, 7:41. Patriots 26–0.

**Fourth quarter**

- NE – Sony Michel 1-yard run (Mike Nugent kick), 12:32. Patriots 33–0. **Drive: 11 plays, 59 yards, 4:42.**

**Top passers**

- NE – Tom Brady – 31/45, 249 yards, TD, INT
- NYJ – Sam Darnold – 11/32, 86 yards, 4 INT

**Top rushers**

- NE – Sony Michel – 19 rushes, 42 yards, 3 TD
- NYJ – Le'Veon Bell – 15 rushes, 70 yards

**Top receivers**

- NE – James White – 7 receptions, 59 yards
- NYJ – Demaryius Thomas – 3 receptions, 42 yards

After a strong performance the previous week, the Jets were shut out at home in a rematch against the Patriots, with Sam Darnold throwing a career-high 4 interceptions during the game. With the disastrous 33–0 loss on Monday Night Football, the Jets fell to 1–5 and extended their losing streak against the Patriots to 8 straight.

==== Week 8: at Jacksonville Jaguars ====
Week Eight: New York Jets at Jacksonville Jaguars – Game summary

Quarter	1	2	3	4	Total
Jets	7	0	0	8	**15**
**Jaguars**	13	6	3	7	**29**

at TIAA Bank Field, Jacksonville, Florida

- Date: October 27
- Game time: 1:00 p.m. EDT
- Game weather: Clear, 79 °F (26 °C)
- Game attendance: 57,833
- Referee: Brad Allen
- TV announcers (CBS): Spero Dedes and Adam Archuleta
- Recap, Game Book

Game information

**First quarter**

- JAX – Keelan Cole 6-yard pass from Gardner Minshew (kick failed, wide right), 12:39. Jaguars 6–0. **Drive: 4 plays, 77 yards, 2:21.**
- NYJ – Ryan Griffin 24-yard pass from Sam Darnold (Sam Ficken kick), 4:51. Jets 7–6. **Drive: 12 plays, 93 yards, 7:48.**
- JAX – Chris Conley 70-yard pass from Gardner Minshew (Josh Lambo kick), 1:11. Jaguars 13–7. **Drive: 2 plays, 73 yards, 0:50.**

**Second quarter**

- JAX – Josh Lambo 29-yard field goal, 2:57. Jaguars 16–7. **Drive: 17 plays, 84 yards, 8:56.**
- JAX – Josh Lambo 43-yard field goal, 0:11. Jaguars 19–7. **Drive: 10 plays, 39 yards, 1:32.**

**Third quarter**

- JAX – Josh Lambo 24-yard field goal, 2:11. Jaguars 22–7. **Drive: 8 plays, 64 yards, 3:03.**

**Fourth quarter**

- NYJ – Ryan Griffin 3-yard pass from Sam Darnold (Sam Darnold-Ryan Griffin pass), 13:07. Jaguars 22–15. **Drive: 9 plays, 75 yards, 4:04.**
- JAX – D. J. Chark 8-yard pass from Gardner Minshew (Josh Lambo kick), 4:13. Jaguars 29–15. **Drive: 8 plays, 24 yards, 4:26.**

**Top passers**

- NYJ – Sam Darnold – 21/30, 218 yards, 2 TD, 3 INT
- JAX – Gardner Minshew – 22/34, 279 yards, 3 TD

**Top rushers**

- NYJ – Le'Veon Bell – 9 rushes, 23 yards
- JAX – Leonard Fournette – 19 rushes, 76 yards

**Top receivers**

- NYJ – Ryan Griffin – 4 receptions, 66 yards, 2 TD
- JAX – Chris Conley – 4 receptions, 103 yards, TD

==== Week 9: at Miami Dolphins ====
Week Nine: New York Jets at Miami Dolphins – Game summary

Quarter	1	2	3	4	Total
Jets	7	5	3	3	**18**
**Dolphins**	0	21	3	2	**26**

at Hard Rock Stadium, Miami Gardens, Florida

- Date: November 3
- Game time: 1:00 p.m. EST
- Game weather: Mostly cloudy, 85 °F (29 °C)
- Game attendance: 59,229
- Referee: Walt Anderson
- TV announcers (CBS): Spero Dedes, Adam Archuleta and AJ Ross
- Recap, Game Book

Game information

**First quarter**

- NYJ – Jamison Crowder 12-yard pass from Sam Darnold (Sam Ficken kick), 9:37. Jets 7–0. **Drive: 11 plays, 75 yards, 5:23.**

**Second quarter**

- MIA – Preston Williams 12-yard pass from Ryan Fitzpatrick (Jason Sanders kick), 14:48. Tied 7–7. **Drive: 7 plays, 61 yards, 2:17.**
- MIA – Devante Parker 17-yard pass from Ryan Fitzpatrick (Jason Sanders kick), 6:14. Dolphins 14–7. **Drive: 12 plays, 84 yards, 5:16.**
- MIA – Preston Williams 5-yard pass from Ryan Fitzpatrick (Jason Sanders kick), 1:51. Dolphins 21–7. **Drive: 7 plays, 56 yards, 2:46.**
- NYJ – Ryan Fitzpatrick tackled in end zone by James Burgess for a safety, 0:47. Dolphins 21–9.
- NYJ – Sam Ficken 52-yard field goal, 0:02. Dolphins 21–12. **Drive: 4 plays, 16 yards, 0:45.**

**Third quarter**

- NYJ – Sam Ficken 40-yard field goal, 6:46. Dolphins 21–15. **Drive: 9 plays, 39 yards, 4:56.**
- MIA – Jason Sanders 26-yard field goal, 1:00. Dolphins 24–15. **Drive: 11 plays, 68 yards, 5:46.**

**Fourth quarter**

- MIA – Sam Darnold aborted. Jonotthan Harrison fumble out of bounds in end zone for a safety, 6:29. Dolphins 26–15.
- NYJ – Sam Ficken 29-yard field goal, 0:15. Dolphins 26–18. **Drive: 14 yards, 81 yards, 2:35.**

**Top passers**

- NYJ – Sam Darnold – 27/39, 260 yards, TD, INT
- MIA – Ryan Fitzpatrick – 24/36, 288 yards, 3 TD

**Top rushers**

- NYJ – Le'Veon Bell – 17 rushes, 66 yards
- MIA – Mark Walton – 12 rushes, 29 yards

**Top receivers**

- NYJ – Jamison Crowder – 8 receptions, 83 yards, TD
- MIA – Mike Gesicki – 6 receptions, 95 yards

Adam Gase faced off against his former team in the Dolphins for the first time since his firing after the previous season. The Jets scored first with a Sam Darnold touchdown pass to Jamison Crowder, but the Dolphins stormed back with three touchdown passes from former Jets quarterback Ryan Fitzpatrick in the second quarter, which was too much for the Jets to overcome due to sloppy play in the second half, including a fumbled snap out of bounds for a safety. With the loss, the Jets not only fell to 1–7, but gave Miami its first win of the year.

==== Week 10: vs. New York Giants ====
Week Ten: New York Giants at New York Jets – Game summary

Quarter	1	2	3	4	Total
Giants	0	13	14	0	**27**
**Jets**	14	0	10	10	**34**

at MetLife Stadium, East Rutherford, New Jersey

- Date: November 10
- Game time: 1:00 p.m. EST
- Game weather: Cloudy, 48 °F (9 °C)
- Game attendance: 78,523
- Referee: John Hussey
- TV announcers (Fox): Kenny Albert, Ronde Barber and Lindsay Czarniak
- Recap, Game Book

Game information

**First quarter**

- NYJ - Sam Darnold 2-yard run (Sam Ficken kick), 7:21. Jets 7–0. **Drive: 13 plays, 75 yards, 7:39.**
- NYJ - Jamison Crowder 23-yard pass from Sam Darnold (Sam Ficken kick), 1:35. Jets 14–0. **Drive: 9 plays, 50 yards, 4:05.**

**Second quarter**

- NYG - Darius Slayton 5-yard pass from Daniel Jones (Aldrick Rosas kick), 12:26. Jets 14–7. **Drive: 8 plays, 75 yards, 4:09.**
- NYG - Darius Slayton 39-yard pass from Daniel Jones (pass failed), 5:24. Jets 14–13. **Drive: 7 plays, 61 yards, 4:05.**

**Third quarter**

- NYJ - Jamal Adams 25-yard fumble return (Sam Ficken kick), 14:13. Jets 21–13.
- NYG - Golden Tate 61-yard pass from Daniel Jones (kick failed), 11:51. Jets 21–19. **Drive: 5 plays, 75 yards, 2:22.**
- NYG - Golden Tate 15-yard pass from Daniel Jones (Daniel Jones - Bennie Fowler pass). Giants 27–21. **Drive: 9 plays, 64 yards, 5:01.**
- NYJ - Sam Ficken 53-yard field goal, 1:42. Giants 27–24. **Drive: 9 plays, 46 yards, 3:39.**

**Fourth quarter**

- NYJ - Le'Veon Bell 1-yard run (Sam Ficken kick), 14:52. Jets 31–27. **Drive: 3 plays, 70 yards, 1:01.**
- NYJ - Sam Ficken 35-yard field goal, 7:36. Jets 34–27. **Drive: 8 plays, 76 yards, 4:27.**

**Top passers**

- NYG – Daniel Jones – 26/40, 308 yards, 4 TD
- NYJ – Sam Darnold – 19/30, 230 yards, TD

**Top rushers**

- NYG – Daniel Jones – 3 rushes, 20 yards
- NYJ – Le'Veon Bell – 18 rushes, 34 yards

**Top receivers**

- NYG – Darius Slayton – 10 receptions, 121 yards
- NYJ – Demaryius Thomas – 6 receptions, 84 yards

In a back-and-forth game against the crosstown-rival Giants, the Jets defense limited Giants running back Saquon Barkley to 1 rushing yard on the day and sacked rookie quarterback Daniel Jones six times despite allowing him to pass for 308 yards and 4 touchdowns. But a key Giants fumble when Jamal Adams stripped the ball from the Giants quarterback's hands and duly returned for touchdown, in addition to a more balanced Jets offense, allowed the Jets to win 34–27 to improve to 2–7. This marked the Jets first home win over the Giants since 1988.

==== Week 11: at Washington Redskins ====
Week Eleven: New York Jets at Washington Redskins – Game summary

Quarter	1	2	3	4	Total
**Jets**	6	14	0	14	**34**
Redskins	0	3	0	14	**17**

at FedEx Field, Landover, Maryland

- Date: November 17
- Game time: 1:00 p.m. EST
- Game weather: Cloudy, 43 °F (6 °C)
- Game attendance: 56,426
- Referee: Jerome Boger
- TV announcers (Fox): Kenny Albert, Ronde Barber and Sara Walsh
- Recap, Game Book

Game information

**First quarter**

- NYJ - Daniel Brown 20-yard pass from Sam Darnold (kick failed), 11:50. Jets 6–0. **Drive: 7 plays, 75 yards, 3:10.**

**Second quarter**

- NYJ - Robby Anderson 6-yard pass from Sam Darnold (Sam Ficken kick), 14:01. Jets 13–0. **Drive: 12 plays, 62 yards, 5:24.**
- WAS - Dustin Hopkins 44-yard field goal, 9:05. Jets 13–3. **Drive: 4 plays, -10 yards, 1:26.**
- NYJ - Ryan Griffin 16-yard pass from Sam Darnold (Sam Ficken kick), 0:36. Jets 20–3. **Drive: 3 plays, 82 yards, 0:43.**

**Third quarter**

- No scoring plays.

**Fourth quarter**

- NYJ - Jamison Crowder 29-yard pass from Sam Darnold (Sam Ficken kick), 13:11. Jets 27–3. **Drive: 10 plays, 60 yards, 4:33.**
- NYJ - Le'Veon Bell 1-yard run (Sam Ficken kick), 12:15. Jets 34–3. **Drive: 2 plays, 5 yards, 0:42.**
- WAS - Derrius Guice 45-yard pass from Dwayne Haskins (Dwayne Haskins - Trey Quinn pass), 9:59. Jets 34–11. **Drive: 6 plays, 69 yards, 2:16.**
- WAS - Jeremy Sprinkle 1-yard pass from Dwayne Haskins (pass failed), 1:11. Jets 34–17. **Drive: 7 plays, 49 yards, 1:55.**

**Top passers**

- WAS – Dwayne Haskins – 19/35, 214 yards, 2 TD, INT
- NYJ – Sam Darnold – 19/30, 293 yards, 4 TD, INT

**Top rushers**

- WAS – Adrian Peterson – 9 rushes, 25 yards
- NYJ – Le'Veon Bell – 18 rushes, 59 yards

**Top receivers**

- WAS – Terry McLaurin – 3 receptions, 69 yards
- NYJ – Ryan Griffin – 5 receptions, 109 yards, TD

==== Week 12: vs. Oakland Raiders ====
Week Twelve: Oakland Raiders at New York Jets – Game summary

Quarter	1	2	3	4	Total
Raiders	3	0	0	0	**3**
**Jets**	3	10	21	0	**34**

at MetLife Stadium, East Rutherford, New Jersey

- Date: November 24
- Game time: 1:00 p.m. EST
- Game weather: Rain, 43 °F (6 °C)
- Game attendance: 78,523
- Referee: Clete Blakeman
- TV announcers (CBS): Greg Gumbel, Trent Green and Melanie Collins
- Recap, Game Book

Game information

**First quarter**

- OAK – Daniel Carlson 48-yard field goal, 9:56. Raiders 3–0. **Drive: 11 plays, 46 yards, 5:04.**
- NYJ – Sam Ficken 24-yard field goal, 5:02. Tied 3–3. **Drive: 10 plays, 69 yards, 4:54.**

**Second quarter**

- NYJ – Sam Darnold 4-yard run (Sam Ficken kick), 10:44. Jets 10–3. **Drive: 12 plays, 96 yards, 7:12.**
- NYJ – Sam Ficken 35-yard field goal, 3:12. Jets 13–3. **Drive: 10 plays, 50 yards, 4:01.**

**Third quarter**

- NYJ – Ryan Griffin 1-yard pass from Sam Darnold (Sam Ficken kick), 12:58. Jets 20–3. **Drive: 4 plays, 81 yards, 2:02.**
- NYJ – Robby Anderson 1-yard pass from San Darnold (Sam Ficken kick), 6:39. Jets 27–3. **Drive: 4 plays, 39 yards, 2:01.**
- NYJ – Brian Poole 15-yard run interception return (Sam Ficken kick), 6:25. Jets 34–3.

**Fourth quarter**

- No scoring plays.

**Top passers**

- OAK – Derek Carr – 15/27, 127 yards, INT
- NYJ – Sam Darnold – 20/29, 315 yards, 2 TD

**Top rushers**

- OAK – Josh Jacobs – 10 rushes, 34 yards
- NYJ – Le'Veon Bell – 12 rushes, 49 yards

**Top receivers**

- OAK – Jalen Richard – 6 receptions, 47 yards
- NYJ – Robby Anderson – 4 receptions, 86 yards, TD

==== Week 13: at Cincinnati Bengals ====
Week Thirteen: New York Jets at Cincinnati Bengals – Game summary

Quarter	1	2	3	4	Total
Jets	3	3	0	0	**6**
**Bengals**	7	10	5	0	**22**

at Paul Brown Stadium, Cincinnati, Ohio

- Date: December 1
- Game time: 1:00 p.m. EST
- Game weather: Cloudy, 46 °F (8 °C)
- Game attendance: 39,804
- Referee: Ronald Torbert
- TV announcers (CBS): Spero Dedes and Adam Archuleta
- Recap, Game Book

Game information

**First quarter**

- NYJ - Sam Ficken 42-yard field goal, 9:08. Jets 3–0. **Drive: 13 plays, 51 yards, 5:52.**
- CIN - Tyler Boyd 17-yard pass from Andy Dalton (Randy Bullock kick), 1:12. Bengals 7–3. **Drive: 7 plays, 62 yards, 3:31.**

**Second quarter**

- CIN - Randy Bullock 24-yard field goal, 9:13. Bengals 10–3. **Drive: 9 plays, 39 yards, 4:57.**
- CIN - Joe Mixon 5-yard run (Randy Bullock kick), 1:46. Bengals 17–3. **Drive: 7 plays, 91 yards, 2:46.**
- NYJ - Sam Ficken 39-yard field goal, 0:04. Bengals 17–6. **Drive: 11 plays, 69 yards, 1:42.**

**Third quarter**

- CIN - Penalty on Kelvin Beachum enforced in end zone for a safety, 5:46. Bengals 19–6.
- CIN - Randy Bullock 47-yard field goal, 1:15. Bengals 22–6. **Drive: 8 plays, 29 yards, 4:31.**

**Fourth quarter**

- No Scoring plays

**Top passers**

- CIN – Andy Dalton – 22/37, 243 yards, TD
- NYJ – Sam Darnold – 28/48, 239 yards

**Top rushers**

- CIN – Joe Mixon – 19 rushes, 44 yards, TD
- NYJ – Le'Veon Bell – 10 rushes, 32 yards

**Top receivers**

- CIN – Tyler Boyd – 5 receptions, 59 yards, TD
- NYJ – Robby Anderson – 7 receptions, 101 yards

Facing the Bengals who came into the game with a record of 0–11, the Jets didn't score a single touchdown and didn't have a single offensive drive moving the ball within the Bengals' 20 yard line. With the loss, the Jets fell to 4–8, snapping their 3-game winning streak and giving Cincinnati its first win of the year. This loss, along with the Dolphins loss from Week 9, marks the first time in NFL history a team lost twice to teams who had 0–7 or worse records.

==== Week 14: vs. Miami Dolphins ====
Week Fourteen: Miami Dolphins at New York Jets – Game summary

Quarter	1	2	3	4	Total
Dolphins	3	6	3	9	**21**
**Jets**	0	16	0	6	**22**

at MetLife Stadium, East Rutherford, New Jersey

- Date: December 8
- Game time: 1:00 p.m. EST
- Game weather: Mostly sunny, 41 °F (5 °C)
- Game attendance: 78,523
- Referee: Craig Wrolstad
- TV announcers (CBS): Tom McCarthy, Jay Feely and Otis Livingston
- Recap, Game Book

Game information

**First quarter**

- MIA - Jason Sanders 22-yard field goal, 3:06. Dolphins 3–0. **Drive: 16 plays, 92 yards, 8:11.**

**Second quarter**

- NYJ - Robby Anderson 26-yard pass from Sam Darnold (kick failed), 13:45. Jets 6–3. **Drive: 10 plays, 74 yards, 4:21.**
- NYJ - Sam Ficken 37-yard field goal, 11:01. Jets 9–3. **Drive: 7 plays, 25 yards, 2:36.**
- MIA - Jason Sanders 25-yard field goal, 5:41. Jets 9–6. **Drive: 10 plays, 67 yards, 5:20.**
- NYJ - Demaryius Thomas 14-yard pass from Sam Darnold (Sam Ficken kick), 1:55. Jets 16–6. **Drive: 7 plays, 77 yards, 3:46.**
- MIA - Jason Sanders 28-yard field goal, 0:19. Jets 16–9. **Drive: 8 plays, 65 yards, 1:36.**

**Third quarter**

- MIA - Jason Sanders 31-yard field goal, 10:43. Jets 16–12. **Drive: 9 plays, 62 yards, 4:17.**

**Fourth quarter**

- MIA - Jason Sanders 53-yard field goal, 10:52. Jets 16–15. **Drive: 8 plays, 45 yards, 3:51.**
- MIA - Jason Sanders 48-yard field goal, 6:59. Dolphins 18–16. **Drive: 5 plays, 36 yards, 2:18.**
- NYJ - Sam Ficken 42-yard field goal, 4:05. Jets 19–18. **Drive: 9 plays, 51 yards, 2:54.**
- MIA - Jason Sanders 37-yard field goal, 1:33. Dolphins 21–19. **Drive: 9 plays, 56 yards, 2:32.**
- NYJ - Sam Ficken 44-yard field goal, 0:00. Jets 22–21. **Drive: 7 plays, 49 yards, 1:33.**

**Top passers**

- NYJ – Sam Darnold – 20/36, 270 yards, 2 TD, INT
- MIA – Ryan Fitzpatrick – 21/37, 245 yards, INT

**Top rushers**

- NYJ – Bilal Powell – 19 rushes, 74 yards
- MIA – Ryan Fitzpatrick – 7 rushes, 65 yards

**Top receivers**

- NYJ - Robby Anderson - 7 receptions, 117 yards, TD
- MIA – Isaiah Ford – 6 receptions, 92 yards

The Jets were eliminated from the playoffs for the ninth straight season following wins by the Steelers and Titans.

==== Week 15: at Baltimore Ravens ====
Week Fifteen: New York Jets at Baltimore Ravens – Game summary

Quarter	1	2	3	4	Total
Jets	0	7	0	14	**21**
**Ravens**	13	8	14	7	**42**

at M&T Bank Stadium, Baltimore, Maryland

- Date: December 12
- Game time: 8:20 p.m. EST
- Game weather: Cloudy, 34 °F (1 °C)
- Game attendance: 70,545
- Referee: John Hussey
- TV announcers (Fox/NFLN/Amazon Prime): Joe Buck, Troy Aikman, Erin Andrews and Kristina Pink
- Recap, Game Book

Game information

**First quarter**

- BAL – Mark Ingram II 6-yard run (Justin Tucker kick), 7:49. Ravens 7–0 **Drive: 9 plays, 84 yards, 5:40.**
- BAL – Miles Boykin 5-yard pass from Lamar Jackson (kick failed, wide left), 2:50. Ravens 13–0 **Drive: 5 plays, 61 yards, 2:19.**

**Second quarter**

- NYJ – Jamison Crowder 4-yard pass from Sam Darnold (Sam Ficken kick), 13:27. Ravens 13–7 **Drive: 8 plays, 63 yards, 4:23.**
- BAL – Mark Andrews 1-yard pass from Lamar Jackson (Mark Ingram II run), 9:43. Ravens 21–7 **Drive: 6 plays, 75 yards, 3:44.**

**Third quarter**

- BAL – Marquise Brown 24-yard pass from Lamar Jackson (Justin Tucker kick), 5:09. Ravens 28–7 **Drive: 2 plays, 24 yards, 0:11.**
- BAL – Seth Roberts 33-yard pass from Lamar Jackson (Justin Tucker kick), 0:58. Ravens 35–7 **Drive: 7 plays, 80 yards, 2:58.**

**Fourth quarter**

- NYJ – B. J. Bello 14-yard return of blocked punt (kick failed, wide right), 12:07. Ravens 35–13.
- BAL – Mark Ingram II 10-yard pass from Lamar Jackson (Justin Tucker kick), 9:58. Ravens 42–13 **Drive: 5 plays, 44 yards, 2:09.**
- NYJ – Jamison Crowder 18-yard pass from Sam Darnold (Sam Darnold–Robby Anderson pass), 7:35. Ravens 42–21 **Drive: 4 plays, 64 yards, 2:23.**

**Top passers**

- NYJ – Sam Darnold – 18/32, 218 yards, 2 TD, INT
- BAL – Lamar Jackson – 15/23, 212 yards, 5 TD

**Top rushers**

- NYJ – Le'Veon Bell – 21 rushes, 87 yards
- BAL – Lamar Jackson – 8 rushes, 86 yards

**Top receivers**

- NYJ – Jamison Crowder – 6 receptions, 90 yards, 2 TD
- BAL – Seth Roberts – 3 receptions, 66 yards, TD

==== Week 16: vs. Pittsburgh Steelers ====
Week Sixteen: Pittsburgh Steelers at New York Jets – Game summary

Quarter	1	2	3	4	Total
Steelers	0	10	0	0	**10**
**Jets**	7	3	3	3	**16**

at MetLife Stadium, East Rutherford, New Jersey

- Date: December 22
- Game time: 1:00 p.m. EST
- Game weather: Sunny and cool, 45 °F (7 °C)
- Game attendance: 78,523
- Referee: Shawn Hochuli
- TV announcers (CBS): Ian Eagle, Dan Fouts and Evan Washburn
- Recap, Game Book

Game information

**First quarter**

- NYJ – Robby Anderson 23-yard pass from Sam Darnold. (Sam Ficken kick), 10:27. Jets 7–0. **Drive: 11 plays, 75 yards, 4:33.**

**Second quarter**

- NYJ – Sam Ficken 54-yard field goal, 14:15. Jets 10–0. **Drive: 7 plays, 23 yards, 2:37.**
- PIT – Chris Boswell 49-yard field goal, 1:18. Jets 10–3. **Drive: 10 plays, 55 yards, 2:24.**
- PIT – Diontae Johnson 29-yard pass from Mason Rudolph. (Chris Boswell kick), 0:04. Tied 10–10. **Drive: 3 plays, 41 yards, 0:24.**

**Third quarter**

- NYJ – Sam Ficken 37-yard field goal, 6:30. Jets 13–10. **Drive: 10 plays, 62 yards, 5:09.**

**Fourth quarter**

- NYJ – Sam Ficken 42-yard field goal, 3:11. Jets 16–10. **Drive: 9 plays, 54 yards, 5:27.**

**Top passers**

- PIT – Mason Rudolph – 14/20, 129 yards, TD
- NYJ – Sam Darnold – 16/26, 183 yards, TD

**Top rushers**

- PIT – James Conner – 6 rushes, 32 yards
- NYJ – Le'Veon Bell – 25 rushes, 72 yards

**Top receivers**

- PIT – Diontae Johnson – 8 receptions, 81 yards, TD
- NYJ – Jamison Crowder – 4 receptions, 60 yards

==== Week 17: at Buffalo Bills ====
Week Seventeen: New York Jets at Buffalo Bills – Game summary

Quarter	1	2	3	4	Total
**Jets**	0	3	0	10	**13**
Bills	0	0	3	3	**6**

at New Era Field, Orchard Park, New York

- Date: December 29
- Game time: 1:00 p.m. EST
- Game weather: Rain, 43 °F (6 °C)
- Game attendance: 69,016
- Referee: Brad Rogers
- TV announcers (CBS): Tom McCarthy and Jay Feely
- Recap, Game Book

Game information

**First quarter**

- No scoring plays

**Second quarter**

- NYJ - Sam Ficken 30-yard field goal, 10:54. Jets 3–0. **Drive: 11 plays, 71 yards, 5:29)**

**Third quarter**

- BUF - Stephen Hauschka 28-yard field goal, 1:29. Tied 3–3. **Drive: 16 plays, 77 yards, 8:11.**

**Fourth quarter**

- NYJ - Jamison Crowder 1-yard pass from Sam Darnold (Sam Ficken kick), 13:31. Jets 10–3. **Drive: 9 plays, 75 yards, 2:58.**
- NYJ - Sam Ficken 47-yard field goal, 2:05. Jets 13–3. **Drive: 7 plays, 13 yards, 3:12.**
- BUF - Stephen Hauschka 29-yard field goal, 0:47. Jets 13–6. **Drive: 8 plays, 67 yards, 1:18.**

**Top passers**

- BUF – Matt Barkley – 18/35, 232 yards, 2 INT
- NYJ – Sam Darnold – 23/36, 199 yards, TD, INT

**Top rushers**

- BUF – Isaiah McKenzie – 2 rushes, 30 yards
- NYJ – Le'Veon Bell – 16 rushes, 41 yards

**Top receivers**

- BUF – Duke Williams – 6 receptions, 108 yards
- NYJ – Jamison Crowder – 8 receptions, 66 yards, TD

As of 2025, this remains the Jets' last road win against the Bills. This would also be their final win in Highmark Stadium (then New Era Field).

=== Standings ===
==== Division ====
AFC East
	W	L	T	PCT	DIV	CONF	PF	PA	STK
^{(3)} New England Patriots	12	4	0	.750	5–1	8–4	420	225	L1
^{(5)} Buffalo Bills	10	6	0	.625	3–3	7–5	314	259	L2
New York Jets	7	9	0	.438	2–4	4–8	276	359	W2
Miami Dolphins	5	11	0	.313	2–4	4–8	306	494	W2

==== Conference ====
AFC
#	Team	Division	W	L	T	PCT	DIV	CONF	SOS	SOV	STK
**Division leaders**
1	Baltimore Ravens	North	14	2	0	.875	5–1	10–2	.494	.484	W12
2 (Note: Kansas City claimed the No. 2 seed over New England based on head-to-head victory.)	Kansas City Chiefs	West	12	4	0	.750	6–0	9–3	.510	.477	W6
3	New England Patriots	East	12	4	0	.750	5–1	8–4	.469	.411	L1
4	Houston Texans	South	10	6	0	.625	4–2	8–4	.520	.488	L1
**Wild Cards**
5	Buffalo Bills	East	10	6	0	.625	3–3	7–5	.461	.363	L2
6	Tennessee Titans	South	9	7	0	.563	3–3	7–5	.488	.465	W1
**Did not qualify for the postseason**
7	Pittsburgh Steelers	North	8	8	0	.500	3–3	6–6	.502	.324	L3
8 (Note: Denver finished ahead of Indianapolis and NY Jets based on conference record. Division tiebreak was initially used to eliminate Oakland (see below).) (Note: Denver finished ahead of Oakland based on conference record.)	Denver Broncos	West	7	9	0	.438	3–3	6–6	.510	.406	W2
9 (Note: Oakland and Indianapolis finished ahead of NY Jets based on conference record.) (Note: Oakland finished ahead of Indianapolis based on head-to-head victory.)	Oakland Raiders	West	7	9	0	.438	3–3	5–7	.482	.335	L1
10	Indianapolis Colts	South	7	9	0	.438	3–3	5–7	.492	.500	L1
11	New York Jets	East	7	9	0	.438	2–4	4–8	.473	.402	W2
12 (Note: Jacksonville finished ahead of Cleveland based on record against common opponents. Jacksonville's cumulative record against Cincinnati, Denver, NY Jets, and Tennessee was 4–1, compared to Cleveland's 2–3 cumulative record against the same four teams.)	Jacksonville Jaguars	South	6	10	0	.375	2–4	6–6	.484	.406	W1
13	Cleveland Browns	North	6	10	0	.375	3–3	6–6	.533	.479	L3
14 (Note: LA Chargers finished ahead of Miami based on head-to-head victory.)	Los Angeles Chargers	West	5	11	0	.313	0–6	3–9	.514	.488	L3
15	Miami Dolphins	East	5	11	0	.313	2–4	4–8	.484	.463	W2
16	Cincinnati Bengals	North	2	14	0	.125	1–5	2–10	.553	.406	W1
**Tiebreakers** (Note: When breaking ties for three or more teams under the NFL's rules, they are first broken within divisions, then comparing only the highest ranked remaining team from each division.)
