= 2018 West Virginia Mountaineers football team =

American college football season

2018 West Virginia Mountaineers football

Camping World Bowl, L 18–34 vs. Syracuse
- Conference: Big 12 Conference

Ranking
- Coaches: No. 22
- AP: No. 20
- Record: 8–4 (6–3 Big 12)
- Head coach: Dana Holgorsen (8th season)
- Offensive coordinator: Jake Spavital (2nd season)
- Offensive scheme: Air raid
- Defensive coordinator: Tony Gibson (5th season)
- Base defense: 3–3–5
- Home stadium: Mountaineer Field at Milan Puskar Stadium

2018 Big 12 Conference football standings
	Conf.			Overall
Team	W		L	W		L
No. 4 Oklahoma y$^	8	–	1	12	–	2
No. 9 Texas y	7	–	2	10	–	4
Iowa State	6	–	3	8	–	5
No. 20 West Virginia	6	–	3	8	–	4
TCU	4	–	5	7	–	6
Baylor	4	–	5	7	–	6
Oklahoma State	3	–	6	7	–	6
Kansas State	3	–	6	5	–	7
Texas Tech	3	–	6	5	–	7
Kansas	1	–	8	3	–	9
Championship: Oklahoma 39, Texas 27
^ – College Football Playoff participant; $ – Conference champion; y – Championship game participant; Rankings from AP Poll

The 2018 West Virginia Mountaineers football team represented West Virginia University in the 2018 NCAA Division I FBS football season. The Mountaineers played their home games at the Mountaineer Field at Milan Puskar Stadium, in Morgantown, West Virginia, and compete in the Big 12 Conference. They were led by eighth-year head coach Dana Holgorsen.

== Preseason ==
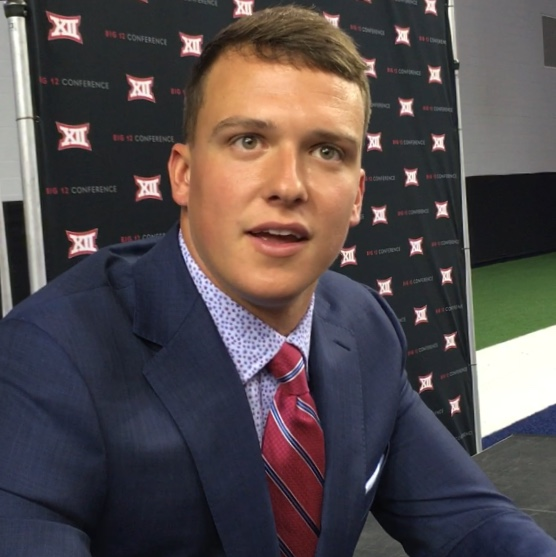
Wide Receiver David Sills V.

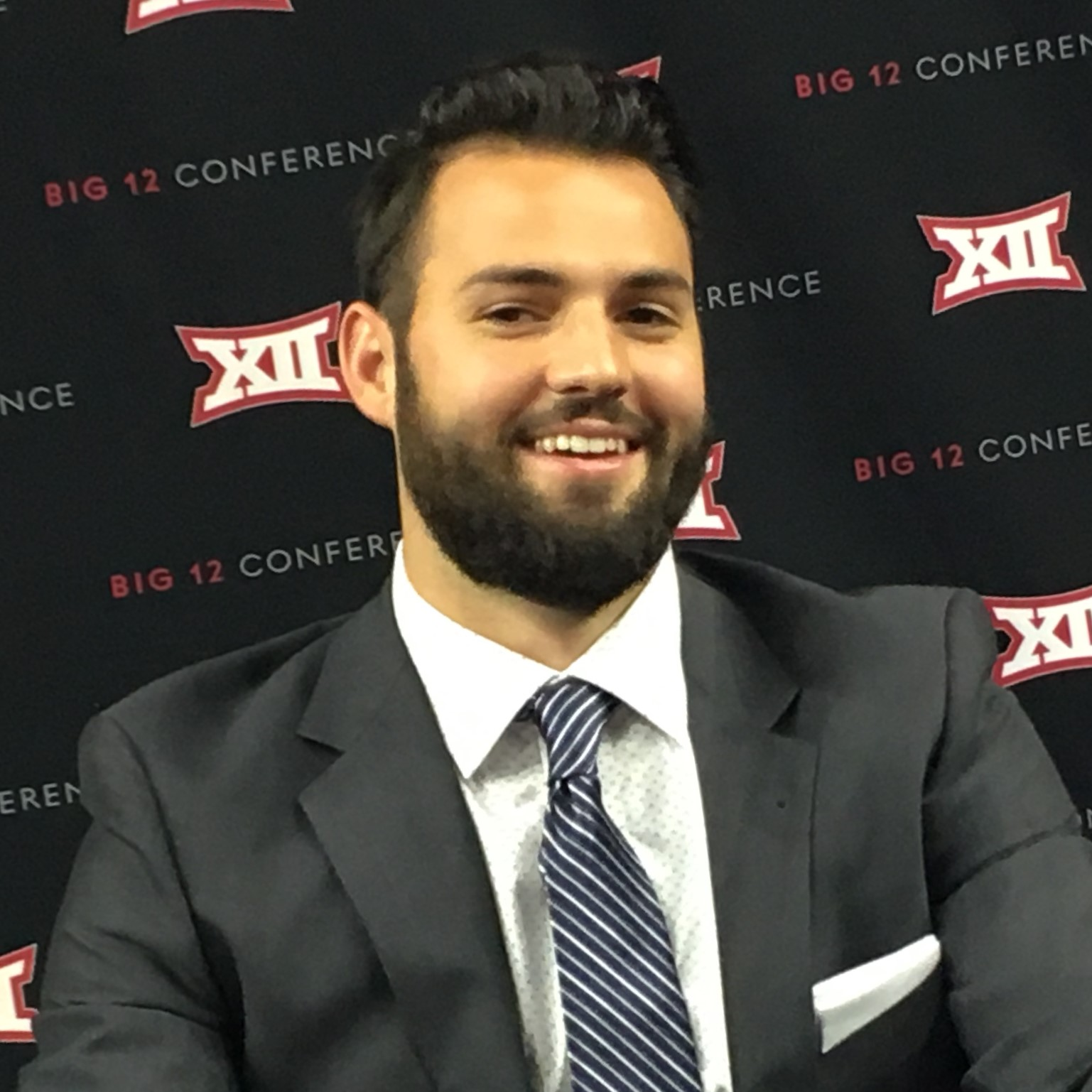
Quarterback Will Grier received numerous accolades prior to the commencement of the 2018 season.

=== First team All-Americans ===
Quarterback Will Grier and wide receiver David Sills were named to numerous preseason All-America teams by various media outlets.

=== Award watch lists ===
Listed in the order that they were released

Award	Player	Position	Year
Chuck Bednarik Award	David Long Jr.	LB	JR
Maxwell Award	Will Grier	QB	SR
Maxwell Award	David Sills	WR	SR
Davey O'Brien Award	Will Grier	QB	SR
Fred Biletnikoff Award	Gary Jennings Jr.	WR	SR
Fred Biletnikoff Award	David Sills	WR	SR
Jim Thorpe Award	Dravon Askew-Henry	S	SR
Bronko Nagurski Trophy	Dravon Askew-Henry	S	SR
Bronko Nagurski Trophy	David Long	LB	JR
Outland Trophy	Yodny Cajuste	OL	SR
Paul Hornung Award	Marcus Simms	WR/KR	JR
Wuerffel Trophy	Will Grier	QB	SR
Walter Camp Award	Will Grier	QB	SR
Walter Camp Award	David Sills	WR	SR
Johnny Unitas Golden Arm Award	Will Grier	QB	SR
Manning Award	Will Grier	QB	SR

=== Big 12 media poll ===
The Big 12 media poll was released on July 12, 2018, with the Mountaineers predicted to finish in second place.

Media poll
Predicted finish	Team	Votes (1st place)
1	Oklahoma	509 (46)
2	West Virginia	432 (2)
3	TCU	390 (1)
4	Texas	370 (1)
5	Oklahoma State	300
6	Kansas State	283 (2)
7	Iowa State	250
8	Texas Tech	149
9	Baylor	125
10	Kansas	52

== Schedule ==
Date	Time	Opponent	Rank	Site	TV	Result	Attendance
September 1	3:30 p.m.	vs. Tennessee*	No. 17	Bank of America Stadium; Charlotte, NC (Belk Kickoff Game / SEC Nation)	CBS	W 40–14	66,793
September 8	6:00 p.m.	Youngstown State*	No. 14	Mountaineer Field; Morgantown, WV	AT&TSN Pitt	W 52–17	58,446
~~September 15~~	~~3:30 p.m.~~	at ~~NC State~~ *	No. 13	~~Carter–Finley Stadium~~; ~~Raleigh, NC~~	~~ESPNU~~	– (Note: West Virginia had originally planned to have a game the previous week against North Carolina State, but it was canceled due to Hurricane Florence.)	–
September 22	3:30 p.m.	Kansas State	No. 12	Mountaineer Field; Morgantown, WV (Stripe the Stadium)	ESPN	W 35–6	59,245
September 29	Noon	at No. 25 Texas Tech	No. 12	Jones AT&T Stadium; Lubbock, TX	ESPN2	W 42–34	55,283
October 6	Noon	Kansas^{†}	No. 9	Mountaineer Field; Morgantown, WV (Gold Rush)	ESPN2	W 38–22	57,419
October 13	7:00 p.m.	at Iowa State	No. 6	Jack Trice Stadium; Ames, IA	FS1	L 14–30	56,629
October 25	7:00 p.m.	Baylor	No. 13	Mountaineer Field; Morgantown, WV	FS1	W 58–14	53,117
November 3	3:30 p.m.	at No. 17 Texas	No. 13	Darrell K Royal–Texas Memorial Stadium; Austin, TX	FOX	W 42–41	100,703
November 10	Noon	TCU	No. 9	Mountaineer Field; Morgantown, WV (True Blue)	FS1	W 47–10	60,007
November 17	3:30 p.m.	at Oklahoma State	No. 9	Boone Pickens Stadium; Stillwater, OK	ABC	L 41–45	52,842
November 23	8:00 p.m.	No. 6 Oklahoma	No. 13	Mountaineer Field; Morgantown, WV	ESPN	L 56–59	60,713
December 28	5:15 p.m.	vs. No. 20 Syracuse*	No. 16	Camping World Stadium; Orlando, FL (Camping World Bowl)	ESPN	L 18–34	41,125
*Non-conference game; ^{†}Homecoming; Rankings from AP Poll and CFP Rankings after October 30 released prior to game; All times are in Eastern time

Schedule source:

== Coaching staff ==
Name	Position	Joined Staff
Dana Holgorsen	Head coach	2011
Doug Belk	Cornerbacks	2017
Marquel Blackwell	Running Backs	2018
Matt Caponi	Safeties	2016
Tyron Carrier	Receivers	2017
Dan Gerberry	Tight Ends/Fullbacks	2018
Tony Gibson	Defensive Coordinator/Linebackers	2013
Mark Scott	Linebackers/Special Teams	2015
Jake Spavital	Offensive Coordinator/Quarterbacks	2017
Bruce Tall	Defensive Line	2015
Joe Wickline	Offensive Line	2016

== Roster ==
Position key

Back	B	Center	C	Cornerback	CB	Defensive back	DB
Defensive end	DE	Defensive lineman	DL	Defensive tackle	DT	End	E
Fullback	FB	Guard	G	Halfback	HB	Kicker	K
Kickoff returner	KR	Offensive tackle	OT	Offensive lineman	OL	Linebacker	LB
Long snapper	LS	Punter	P	Punt returner	PR	Quarterback	QB
Running back	RB	Safety	S	Tight end	TE	Wide receiver	WR

2018 West Virginia Mountaineers football team roster
Players
Coaches
Offense

Pos.	#	Name	Class
WR	1	T. J. Simmons	So
QB	3	Trent Jackson	Fr
RB	4	Leddie Brown	Fr
RB	6	Kennedy McKoy	Jr
QB	7	Will Grier	Sr
WR	8	Marcus Simms	Jr
QB	10	Trey Lowe III	Fr
QB	11	Jack Allison	So
WR	12	Gary Jennings Jr.	Sr
WR	13	David Sills	Sr
RB	14	Tevin Bush	So
WR	16	William Crest Jr.	Sr
WR	19	Druw Bowen	So
RB	20	Alec Sinkfield	Fr
WR	22	Anthony Delpercio	Fr
WR	24	Roman Hawkins	Fr
WR	27	Kwincy Hall	Fr
WR	29	Chase Riley	Fr
RB	32	Martell Pettaway	Jr
RB	33	T. J. Kpan	Fr
RB	34	Lorenzo Dorr	So
RB	35	Brady Watson	Jr
WR	36	Ricky Johns	Fr
WR	37	Kolby Mack	Fr
TE, FB	41	Elijah Drummond	So
FB, TE	42	Logan Thimons	So
TE, FB	47	Joseph Turner	Fr
OL	53	Colton McKivitz	Jr
OL	54	Eric Sjostedt	Fr
OL	55	Yodny Cajuste	Sr
OL	57	Michael Brown	Jr
OL	58	Joe Brown	Jr
OL	60	Noah Drummond	Fr
OL	62	Zach Davis	So
OL	62	Garrett Smyton	Fr
OL	65	Isaiah Hardy	Sr
OL	66	Adam Stilley	Fr
OL	68	Briason Mays	Fr
OL	69	Blaine Scott	Fr
OL	70	Tyler Thurmond	So
OL	71	Junior Uzebu	Fr
OL	72	Kelby Wickline	Jr
OL	73	Josh Sills	So
OL	76	Chase Behrndt	So
OL	78	Jacob Buccigrossi	So
OL	79	Matt Jones	Jr
TE, FB	80	Jesse Beal	Fr
WR	82	Dominique Maiden	Sr
WR	83	Bryce Ford-Wheaton	Fr
TE, FB	84	Jovani Haskins	So
TE	85	T. J. Banks	Fr
WR	85	Sam James	Fr
WR	86	Randy Fields Jr.	Fr
TE	87	Mike O'Laughlin	Fr
TE	88	Trevon Wesco	Sr
WR	89	Dillon Spalding	Fr

Defense

Pos.	#	Name	Class
CB	1	Derrek Pitts Jr.	So
S	2	Kenny Robinson	So
S	3	Toyous Avery Jr.	Sr
S	4	Josh Norwood	Jr
DL	5	Ezekiel Rose	Sr
S	6	Dravon Askew-Henry	Sr
LB	7	Brendan Ferns	So
S	8	Kwantel Raines	Fr
S	9	Jovanni Stewart	Jr
CB	10	Dylan Tonkery	So
S	11	Chase Hill	Fr
LB	11	David Long Jr.	Jr
DL	13	Jeffrey Pooler Jr.	So
LB	17	Exree Loe	Fr
LB	18	Charlie Benton	So
CB	18	Jaelen Gross	Fr
CB	19	Barry Moreland	Jr
CB	22	Jake Long	So
CB	23	Jordan Adams	Jr
CB	24	Hakeem Bailey	Jr
S	25	Osman Kamara	So
S	26	Deamonte Lindsay	Jr
S	27	E. J. Brown	Fr
S	28	Rashon Lusane	So
CB	28	Keith Washington	Jr
CB	29	Sean Mahone	So
LB	31	Zach Sandwisch	So
LB	32	Vandarius Cowan	So
LB	33	Quondarius Qualls	Sr
LB	34	Shea Campbell	Jr
LB	35	Josh Chandler	Fr
S	39	Dante Bonamico	So
LB	39	Henry Cook	Fr
DL	40	Kenny Bigelow Jr.	Sr
LB	45	Adam Hensley	Jr
DL	46	Reese Donahue	Jr
DL	49	Nick Rush	Fr
DL	50	Jabril Robinson	Sr
LB	51	Jake Abbott	Fr
DL	55	Dante Stills	Fr
DL	56	Darius Stills	So
DL	57	Nate Green	So
LB	59	Luke Williams	So
DL	67	Josh Ritchie	Fr
DL	74	James Gmiter	Fr
DL	77	Daniel Buchanan	Fr
DL	87	Stone Wolfley	Jr
DL	90	Brenon Thrift	Sr
TE, FB	91	Matt Bezjak	So
DL	91	Tavis Lee	Fr
DL	92	Dalton McDaniels	Fr
DL	97	Connor Barwis	Fr
DL	98	Tyrese Allen	Fr
DL	99	Sam Cookman	Fr

Special teams

Pos.	#	Name	Class
P, K	16	Billy Kinney	Sr
P	23	Evan Matthews	Fr
K	30	Evan Staley	So
K, P	31	Casey Legg	Fr
K	43	Luke Hogan	So
K	48	Skyler Simcox	Jr
LS	51	Kyle Poland	So
LS	52	J. P. Hadley	Fr
LS	52	Rex Sunahara	Jr

Head coach

- Dana Holgorsen

Coordinators/assistant coaches

- Doug Belk – Cornerbacks
- Marquel Blackwell – Running Backs
- Matt Caponi – Safeties
- Tyron Carrier – Receivers
- Tony Gibson – Defensive Coordinator, Linebackers
- Mark Scott – Linebackers, Special Teams
- Jake Spavital – Offensive Coordinator, Quarterbacks
- Bruce Tall – Defensive Line
- Joe Wickline – Offensive Line

Legend

- (C) Team captain
- (S) Suspended
- (I) Ineligible
- Injured
- Redshirt

Roster
Last update: August 22, 2018

== Game summaries ==
=== Vs. Tennessee ===
No. 17 West Virginia Mountaineers vs. Tennessee Volunteers – Game summary

Quarter	1	2	3	4	Total
No. 17 Mountaineers	10	3	20	7	40
Tennessee	0	7	7	0	14

at Bank of America Stadium, Charlotte, NC

- Date: September 1
- Game time: 3:30 p.m.
- Game weather: Temperature: 89 °F (32 °C) • Weather: Sunny • Wind: ESE 4 MPH
- Game attendance: 66,793
- Referee: Gary Patterson
- TV: CBS

Game information

First quarter

- 11:00 WVU FG – Evan Staley 26-yard field goal
- 3:32 WVU TD – .T.J. Simmons 59-yard pass from Will Grier, (Staley PAT)

Second quarter

- 6:13 TENN TD – Dominick Wood-Anderson 1-yard pass from Jarrett Guarantano (Cimaglia PAT)
- 0:00 WVU FG – Evan Staley 35-yard field goal

’Third quarter'

- 12:54 WVU TD – David Sills 33-yard pass from Grier (Staley PAT)
- 8:09 WVU TD – Gary Jennings Jr. 28-yard pass from Grier (Staley PAT)
- 6:09 TENN TD – Tim Jordan 6-yard run (Cimaglia PAT)
- 1:15 WVU TD – Kennedy McKoy 14-yard pass from Grier (Conversion failed)

Fourth quarter

- 2:02 WVU TD – Sills 10-yard pass from Grier (Staley PAT)

Top passers

- WVU – Will Grier: 25–34, 429 yards, 5 TDs
- TENN – Jarrett Guarantano: 19–25, 172 yards, 1 TD

Top rushers

- WVU – Martell Pettaway: 9 rushes, 56 yards
- TENN – Tim Jordan: 20 rushes, 118 yards, 1 TD

Top receivers

- WVU – David Sills V: 7 receptions, 140 yards, 2 TDs
- TENN – Marquez Callaway: 6 receptions, 63 yards

Statistics

Statistics	West Virginia	Tennessee
First downs	26	19
Total yards	547	301
Rushing yards	118	129
Passing yards	429	172
Turnovers	1	0
Time of possession	27:37	32:23

=== Youngstown State ===
No. 13 West Virginia Mountaineers vs. Youngstown State Penguins – Game summary

Quarter	1	2	3	4	Total
Penguins	0	7	10	0	17
No. 13 Mountaineers	7	14	21	10	52

at Mountaineer Field, Morgantown, WV

- Date: September 8
- Game time: 6:00 p.m.
- Game weather: Temperature: 64 °F (18 °C) • Weather: Rain • Wind: 10 MPH
- Game attendance: 58,446
- Referee: Gary Patterson
- TV announcers (AT&T SportsNet Pittsburgh): Rob King (play-by-play), Rasheed Marshall (color), Meg Bulger (sideline)

Game information

First quarter

- 3:50 WVU TD – Alec Sinkfield 9-yard run (Staley PAT)
- 12:52 WVU TD – Gary Jennings Jr. 11-yard pass from Will Grier, (Staley PAT)

Second quarter

- 9:01 YSU TD – Miles Joiner 4-yard pass from Montgomery VanGorder (Kennedy PAT)
- 1:00 WVU TD – Gary Jennings Jr. 24-yard pass from Will Grier, (Staley PAT)

’Third quarter'

- 12:19 WVU TD – Gary Jennings Jr. 33-yard pass from Will Grier (Staley PAT)
- 09:29 YSU TD – Tevin McCaster 13-yard run (Kennedy PAT)
- 04:02 WVU TD – Leddie Brown 1-yard run (Staley PAT)
- 03:20 WVU TD – Kennedy McKoy 8-yard run (Staley PAT)
- 00:01 YSU FG – Zak Kennedy 45-yard field goal

Fourth quarter

- 14:37 WVU TD – Dominique Maiden 40-yard pass from Will Grier (Staley PAT)
- 8:37 WVU FG – Evan Staley 31-yard field goal

Top passers

- WVU – Will Grier: 21–26, 332 yards, 4 TD, 1 INT
- YSU – Montgomery VanGorder: 11–24, 157 yards, 1 TD, 1 INT

Top rushers

- WVU – Leddie Brown: 15 rushes, 115 yards, 1 TD
- YSU – Tevin McCaster: 14 rushes, 72 yards, 1 TD

Top receivers

- WVU – Marcus Simms: 8 receptions, 119 yards
- YSU – Zach Farrar: 6 receptions, 135 yards

Statistics

Statistics	West Virginia	Youngstown State
First downs	29	19
Total yards	625	293
Rushing yards	289	136
Passing yards	336	157
Turnovers	1	1
Time of possession	29:15	30:45

=== Kansas State ===
No. 12 West Virginia Mountaineers vs. Kansas State Wildcats – Game summary

Quarter	1	2	3	4	Total
Wildcats	0	0	3	3	6
No. 12 Mountaineers	7	14	14	0	35

at Mountaineer Field, Morgantown, WV

- Date: September 22
- Game time: 3:30 p.m.
- Game weather: Temperature: 64 °F (18 °C) • Weather: Rain • Wind: 10 MPH
- Game attendance: 59,245
- Referee: Brandon Cruse
- TV announcers (ESPN): Clay Matvick (play-by-play), Dan Orlovsky (color)

Game information

First quarter

- 4:46 WVU TD – Marcus Simms 82-yard pass from Will Grier (Staley PAT)

Second quarter

- 2:31 WVU TD – David Sills 1-yard pass from Will Grier (Staley PAT)
- 0:02 WVU TD – David Sills 1-yard pass from Will Grier (Staley PAT)

’Third quarter'

- 09:29 KSU FG – Blake Lynch 25-yard field goal
- 9:01 WVU TD – Tevin Bush 62-yard pass from Will Grier (Staley PAT)
- 7:39 WVU TD – David Sills 1-yard pass from Will Grier (Staley PAT)

Fourth quarter

- 13:48 KSU FG – Blake Lynch 38-yard field goal

Top passers

- WVU – Will Grier: 25–35, 356 yards, 3 TD, 2 INT
- KSU – Skylar Thompson: 11–17, 145 yards

Top rushers

- WVU – Kennedy McKoy: 12 rushes, 73 yards
- KSU – Alex Barnes: 12 rushes, 49 yards

Top receivers

- WVU – Marcus Simms: 5 receptions, 136 yards, 1 TD
- KSU – Isaiah Zuber: 10 receptions, 133 yards

Statistics

Statistics	West Virginia	Kansas State
First downs	20	17
Total yards	464	318
Rushing yards	108	136
Passing yards	356	157
Turnovers	3	0
Time of possession	26:37	33:23

The team and coaches began preparations against Kansas State early. Mountaineer Coach Dana Holgorsen said, "Kansas State's a tough outfit that we've got to prepare for."

Both teams started conference play with this game. Kansas State entered the game with a record of 2–1 where West Virginia had already secured victories against Tennessee (40–14) and Youngstown State (523–-17)." This game is the ninth meeting between the two teams with the Wildcats holding a 5–3 overall lead. The teams have split the four games played at West Virginia.

West Virginia managed to take control of the game mid-way through the second quarter after Kansas State failed to convert on fourth down. West Virginia ended ahead at the half 21–0. Kansas State managed control the ball more on offense but it wasn't enough, as West Virginia achieved 464 total yards compared to Kansas State's 318. Although West Virginia had four turnovers to Kansas State's one, the Wildcats lost 69 yards on 8 penalties compared to the Mountaineer's 35 yards on 3 penalties. West Virginia was 8–12 on third down conversions compared to Kansas State's 3–14.

In the second half of play, Kansas State was successful with two field goals and additional scores by the Mountaineers put the game to a conclusion of West Virginia's victory 35–6.

=== At Texas Tech ===
No. 12 West Virginia Mountaineers at No. 25 Texas Tech Red Raiders – Game summary

Quarter	1	2	3	4	Total
No. 12 Mountaineers	28	7	0	7	42
No. 25 Red Raiders	7	3	7	17	34

at Jones AT&T Stadium, Lubbock, TX

- Date: September 29
- Game time: 11:00 a.m.
- Game weather: Temperature: 61 °F (16 °C) • Weather: partly cloudy • Wind: S 5 MPH
- Game attendance: 55,283
- Referee: Brad VanVark
- TV announcers (ESPN2): Anish Shroff (play-by-play), Ahmad Brooks (color)

Game information

First quarter

- 12:21 WVU TD – Gary Jennings Jr. 13-yard pass from Will Grier (Staley PAT)
- 8:06 WVU TD – Leddie Brown 1-yard run (Staley PAT)
- 3:03 WVU TD – Marcus Simms 45-yard pass from Will Grier (Staley PAT)
- 2:06 TTU TD – Antoine Wesley 40-yard pass from Alan Bowman (Hatfield PAT)
- 0:04 WVU TD – Kennedy McKoy 38-yard run (Staley PAT)

Second quarter

- 9:38 TTU FG – Clayton Hatfield 25-yard field goal
- 1:08 WVU TD – Gary Jennings Jr. 14-yard pass from Will Grier (Staley PAT)

Third quarter

- 3:02 TTU TD – De'Quan Bowman 2-yard pass from Jett Duffey (Hatfield PAT)

Fourth quarter

- 12:31 TTU FG – Clayton Hatfield 27-yard field goal
- 7:50 TTU TD – Jett Duffey 3-yard run (Hatfield PAT)
- 2:58 WVU TD – Keith Washington 51-yard interception return (Staley PAT)
- 0:38 TTU TD – Ta'Zhawn Henry 1-yard run (Hatfield PAT)

Top passers

- WVU – Will Grier: 27/41, 370 yards, 3 TD
- TTU – Jett Duffey: 16/27, 172 yards, TD, 2 INT

Top rushers

- WVU – Kennedy McCoy: 11 carries, 77 yards, 1 TD
- TTU – Jett Duffey: 15 carries, 86 yards, 1 TD

Top receivers

- WVU – Marcus Simms: 9 receptions, 138 yards, 1 TD
- TTU – Antoine Wesley: 8 receptions, 110 yards, 1 TD

Statistics

Statistics	West Virginia	Texas Tech
First downs	26	28
Total yards	489	463
Rushing yards	119	168
Passing yards	370	295
Turnovers	0	3
Time of possession	30:26	29:34

=== Kansas ===
No. 9 West Virginia Mountaineers vs. Kansas Jayhawks – Game summary

Quarter	1	2	3	4	Total
Jayhawks	7	0	7	8	22
No. 9 Mountaineers	14	7	7	10	38

at Mountaineer Field, Morgantown, WV

- Date: October 6
- Game time: Noon
- Game weather: Temperature: 79 °F (26 °C) • Weather: Partly Cloudy • Wind: N 5 MPH
- Game attendance: 58,446
- Referee: Scott Campbell
- TV announcers (ESPN2): Anish Shroff (play-by-play), Ahmad Brooks (color)

Game information

First quarter

- 9:28 WVU TD – Leddie Brown 15-yard pass from Will Grier (Staley PAT)
- 5:21 WVU TD – Leddie Brown 1-yard run (Staley PAT)
- 0:12 KU TD – Mavin Saunders 18-yard pass from Peyton Bender (Rui PAT)

Second quarter

- 11:52 WVU TD – Jovani Haskins 14-yard pass from Will Grier (Staley PAT)

’Third quarter'

- 10:50 KU TD – Khalil Herbert 31-yard run (Rui PAT)
- 0:00 WVU TD – Martell Pettaway 12-yard pass from Will Grier (Staley PAT)

Fourth quarter

- 5:05 WVU FG – Evan Staley 49-yard field goal
- 2:20 WVU TD – David Sills 17-yard pass from Will Grier (Staley PAT)
- 0:00 KU TD – Daylon Charlot 18-yard pass from Peyton Bender (Lassiter Pass)

Top passers

- WVU – Will Grier: 28–41, 332 yards, 4 TD, 3 INT
- KU – Peyton Bender: 16–25, 191 yards, 2 TD, 1 INT

Top rushers

- WVU – Leddie Brown: 11 rushes, 107 yards, 1 TD
- KU – Pooka Williams Jr.: 12 rushes, 65 yards

Top receivers

- WVU – David Sills: 7 receptions, 74 yards, 1 TD
- KU – Jeremiah Booker: 4 receptions, 63 yards

Statistics

Statistics	West Virginia	Kansas
First downs	29	16
Total yards	509	286
Rushing yards	177	80
Passing yards	332	206
Turnovers	3	2
Time of possession	34:11	25:49

=== At Iowa State ===
No. 6 West Virginia Mountaineers at Iowa State Cyclones – Game summary

Quarter	1	2	3	4	Total
No. 6 Mountaineers	7	7	0	0	14
Cyclones	13	7	0	10	30

at Jack Trice Stadium, Ames, IA

- Date: October 13
- Game time: 7:00 p.m.
- Game weather: Temperature: 55 °F (13 °C) • Weather: Scattered Clouds • Wind:S 0–5 MPH
- Game attendance: 56,629
- Referee: David Alvarez
- TV announcers (Fox Sports 1): Tim Brando (play-by-play), Spencer Tillman (color)

Game information

First quarter

- 6:47 WVU TD – David Sills 18-yard pass from Will Grier (Staley PAT)
- 4:24 ISU TD – Hakeem Butler 4-yard pass from Brock Purdy (Assalley PAT)
- 0:13 ISU TD – David Montgomery 2-yard run (Kick Failed)

Second quarter

- 9:21 ISU TD – Charlie Kolar 19-yard pass from Brock Purdy (Assalley PAT)
- 2:58 WVU TD – Derrek Pitts Jr. 72-yard blocked field goal return (Staley PAT)

Fourth quarter

- 12:17 ISU TD – Deshaunte Jones 32-yard pass from Brock Purdy (Eaton Pass)
- 5:14 ISU – Team Safety

Top passers

- WVU – Will Grier: 11/15, 100 yards, 1 TD, 1 INT
- ISU – Brock Purdy: 18/25, 254 yards, 3 TD, 1 INT

Top rushers

- WVU – Kennedy McCoy: 9 rushes, 55 yards
- ISU – David Montgomery: 29 rushes, 189 yards, 1 TD

Top receivers

- WVU – Gary Jennings Jr.: 4 receptions, 38 yards
- ISU – Hakeem Butler: 6 receptions, 107 yards, 1 TD

Statistics

Statistics	West Virginia	Iowa State
First downs	9	25
Total yards	152	498
Rushing yards	52	244
Passing yards	100	254
Turnovers	1	1
Time of possession	22:39	37:21

=== Baylor ===
No. 9 West Virginia Mountaineers vs. Baylor Bears – Game summary

Quarter	1	2	3	4	Total
Bears	0	0	14	0	14
No. 13 Mountaineers	10	31	10	7	58

at Mountaineer Field, Morgantown, WV

- Date: October 25
- Game time: 7:00 p.m.
- Game weather: Temperature: 45 °F (7 °C) • Weather: Clear • Wind: NNE 4 MPH
- Game attendance: 53,117
- Referee: Eddy Shelton
- TV announcers (Fox Sports 1): Justin Kutcher (play-by-play), DeMarco Murray (color), Petros Papadakis (color)

Game information

First quarter

- 14:10 WVU TD – Gary Jennings, Jr. 53-yard pass from Will Grier (Staley PAT)
- 2:53 WVU FG – Evan Staley 25-yard field goal

Second quarter

- 13:21 WVU FG – Evan Staley 47-yard field goal
- 6:40 WVU TD – David Sills 25-yard pass from Will Grier (Staley PAT)
- 6:11 WVU TD – David Sills 65-yard pass from Will Grier (Staley PAT)
- 3:09 WVU TD – Will Grier 1-yard run (Staley PAT)

’Third quarter'

- 14:20 WVU FG – Evan Staley 44-yard field goal
- 9:52 BU TD – Josh Fleeks 2-yard run (Martin PAT)
- 5:34 WVU TD – Leddie Brown 1-yard run (Staley PAT)
- 0:23 BU TD – Jalan McClendon 1-yard run (Martin PAT)

Fourth quarter

- 14:53 WVU TD – Gary Jennings Jr. 36-yard pass from Jack Allison (Staley PAT)

Top passers

- WVU – Will Grier: 17–27, 353 yards, 3 TD
- BU – Jalan McClendon: 16–21, 183 yards

Top rushers

- WVU – Tevin Bush: 1 rush, 79 yards
- BU – JaMycal Hasty: 9 rushes, 43 yards

Top receivers

- WVU – David Sills: 5 receptions, 139 yards, 2 TD
- BU – Jalen Hurd: 3 receptions, 38 yards

Statistics

Statistics	West Virginia	Baylor
First downs	22	17
Total yards	568	287
Rushing yards	172	82
Passing yards	396	205
Turnovers	0	4
Time of possession	28:02	31:50

=== At Texas ===
No. 12 West Virginia Mountaineers at No. 15 Texas Longhorns – Game summary

Quarter	1	2	3	4	Total
No. 12 Mountaineers	10	17	0	15	42
No. 15 Longhorns	14	14	3	10	41

at Darrell K Royal–Texas Memorial Stadium, Austin, TX

- Date: November 3
- Game time: 3:30 p.m.
- Game weather: Temperature: 76 °F (24 °C) • Weather: Partly Cloudy • Wind:SW 8–23 MPH
- Game attendance: 100,703
- Referee: Brad Van Vark
- TV announcers (Fox): Gus Johnson (play-by-play), Joel Klatt (color)

Game information

First quarter

- 11:03 WVU FG – Evan Staley 45-yard field goal
- 4:36 TEX TD – Sam Ehlinger 1-yard run (Dicker PAT)
- 3:08 WVU TD – David Sills 60-yard pass from Will Grier (Staley PAT)
- 1:50 TEX TD – Lil'Jordan Humphrey 21-yard pass from Sam Ehlinger (Dicker PAT)

Second quarter

- 14:49 WVU TD – David Sills 18-yard pass from Will Grier (Staley PAT)
- 10:04 TEX TD – Tre Watson 5-yard run (Dicker PAT)
- 7:36 WVU TD – Martell Pettaway 55-yard run (Staley PAT)
- 2:40 TEX TD – Tre Watson 32-yard pass from Sam Ehlinger (Dicker PAT)
- 0:09 WVU FG – Evan Staley 44-yard field goal

Third Quarter

- 2:55 TEX FG – Cameron Dicker 22-yard field goal

Fourth quarter

- 9:38 TEX FG – Cameron Dicker 38-yard field goal
- 5:40 WVU TD – Martell Pettaway 13-yard run (Staley PAT)
- 2:34 TEX TD – Devin Duvernay 48-yard pass from Sam Ehlinger (Dicker PAT)
- 0:16 WVU TD – Gary Jennings Jr. 33-yard pass from Will Grier (Grier Rush)

Top passers

- WVU – Will Grier: 28/42, 346 yards, 3 TD
- TEX – Sam Ehlinger: 25/36, 354 yards, 3 TD

Top rushers

- WVU – Martell Pettaway: 9 rushes, 121 yards, 2 TD
- TEX – Tre Watson: 14 rushes, 80 yards, 1 TD

Top receivers

- WVU – David Sills: 6 receptions, 97 yards, 2 TD
- TEX – Lil'Jordan Humphrey: 9 receptions, 143 yards, 1 TD

Statistics

Statistics	West Virginia	Texas
First downs	28	28
Total yards	578	520
Rushing yards	232	166
Passing yards	346	354
Turnovers	0	1
Time of possession	26:00	34:00

=== TCU ===
No. 7 West Virginia Mountaineers vs. TCU Horned Frogs – Game summary

Quarter	1	2	3	4	Total
Horned Frogs	3	0	7	0	10
No. 7 Mountaineers	0	24	16	7	47

at Mountaineer Field, Morgantown, WV

- Date: November 10
- Game time: Noon
- Game weather: Temperature: 33 °F (1 °C) • Weather: Partly Cloudy • Wind: SE 9 MPH
- Game attendance: 60,007
- Referee: Eddy Shelton
- TV announcers (Fox Sports 1): Justin Kutcher (play-by-play), DeMarco Murray (color), Petros Papadakis (color)

Game information

First quarter

- 8:10 TCU FG – Jonathan Song 30-yard field goal

Second quarter

- 14:49 WVU FG – Evan Staley 47-yard field goal
- 5:09 WVU TD – Kennedy McKoy 33-yard run (Staley PAT)
- 3:42 WVU TD – Martell Pettaway 1-yard run (Staley PAT)
- 1:39 WVU TD – Trevon Wesco 32-yard pass from Will Grier (Staley PAT)

’Third quarter'

- 14:13 WVU – Team Safety
- 13:12 WVU TD – Kennedy McKoy 1-yard run (Staley PAT)
- 9:48 TCU TD – Jalen Reagor 28-yard pass from Mike Collins (Song PAT)
- 1:25 WVU TD – Gary Jennings Jr. 8-yard pass from Will Grier (Staley PAT)

Fourth quarter

- 10:55 WVU TD – David Sills 4-yard pass from Will Grier (Staley PAT)

Top passers

- WVU – Will Grier: 25–39, 343 yards, 3 TD, 1 INT
- TCU – Mike Collins: 22–37, 229 yards, 1 TD

Top rushers

- WVU – Martell Pettaway: 12 rushes, 59 yards, 1 TD
- TCU – Darius Anderson: 11 rushes, 19 yards

Top receivers

- WVU – Trevon Wesco: 5 receptions, 86 yards, 1 TD
- TCU – Jalen Reagor: 11 receptions, 150 yards, 1 TD

Statistics

Statistics	West Virginia	TCU
First downs	26	12
Total yards	535	222
Rushing yards	164	−7
Passing yards	371	229
Turnovers	2	2
Time of possession	30:18	29:42

=== At Oklahoma State ===
No. 7 West Virginia Mountaineers at Oklahoma State Cowboys – Game summary

Quarter	1	2	3	4	Total
No. 7 Mountaineers	14	17	0	10	41
Cowboys	7	7	10	21	45

at Boone Pickens Stadium, Stillwater, OK

- Date: November 17
- Game time: 3:30 p.m.
- Game weather: Temperature: 62 °F (17 °C) • Weather: Partly Cloudy • Wind: W 8 MPH
- Game attendance: 52,842
- Referee: Cooper Castleberry
- TV announcers (ABC): Sean McDonough (play-by-play), Todd Blackledge (color)

Game information

First quarter

- 11:44 WVU TD – Kennedy McKoy 5-yard run (Staley PAT)
- 4:14 OSU TD – Tylan Wallace 7-yard pass from Taylor Cornelius (Ammendola PAT)
- 3:01 WVU TD – Gary Jennings Jr. 13-yard pass from Will Grier (Staley PAT)

Second quarter

- 14:55 WVU TD – David Sills 22-yard pass from Will Grier (Staley PAT)
- 13:11 OSU TD – Logan Carter 20-yard pass from Taylor Cornelius (Ammendola PAT)
- 1:17 WVU TD – Kennedy McKoy 30-yard run (Staley PAT)
- 0:00 WVU FG – Evan Staley 43-yard field goal

Third Quarter

- 12:25 OSU TD – Chubba Hubbard 1-yard pass from Taylor Cornelius (Ammendola PAT)
- 3:03 OSU FG – Matt Ammendola 20-yard field goal

Fourth quarter

- 14:56 WVU FG – Evan Staley 34-yard field goal
- 10:49 OSU TD – Tyron Johnson 6-yard pass from Taylor Cornelius (Ammendola PAT)
- 7:37 WVU TD – Will Grier 6-yard run (Staley PAT)
- 4:47 OSU TD – Taylor Cornelius 9-yard run (Ammendola PAT)
- 0:42 OSU TD – Tylan Wallace 11-yard pass from Taylor Cornelius (Ammendola PAT)

Top passers

- WVU – Will Grier: 27–48, 364 yards, 2 TD
- OSU – Taylor Cornelius: 30–46, 338 yards, 5 TD, 2 INT

Top rushers

- WVU – Kennedy McKoy: 21 rushes, 148 yards, 2 TD
- OSU – Chubba Hubbard: 26 rushes, 134 yards

Top receivers

- WVU – Gary Jennings Jr.: 7 receptions, 92 yards, 1 TD
- OSU – Dillon Stoner: 9 receptions, 127 yards

Statistics

Statistics	West Virginia	Oklahoma State
First downs	25	35
Total yards	553	604
Rushing yards	189	266
Passing yards	364	338
Turnovers	1	4
Time of possession	29:45	30:15

=== Oklahoma ===
No. 6 Oklahoma Sooners at No. 13 West Virginia Mountaineers – Game summary

Quarter	1	2	3	4	Total
No. 6 Oklahoma	14	21	10	14	59
No. 13 West Virginia	14	14	21	7	56

at Mountaineer Field • Morgantown, West Virginia

- Date: November 23, 2018
- Game time: 8:00 p.m.
- Game weather: Temperature: • Wind: (MPH) • Weather:
- Referee: Mike Defee
- TV announcers (ESPN): Sean McDonough (Play-by-Play), Todd Blackledge (analyst), Holly Rowe (sideline)

Statistics

Statistics	West Virginia	Oklahoma
First downs	33	25
Total yards	704	668
Rushing yards	165	304
Passing yards	539	364
Turnovers	2	2
Time of possession	31:53	28:07

=== Vs. Syracuse (Camping World Bowl) ===
Camping World Bowl: No. 17 Syracuse Orange vs. No. 15 West Virginia Mountaineers – Game summary

Quarter	1	2	3	4	Total
No. 17 Orange	7	7	3	17	34
No. 15 Mountaineers	3	9	6	0	18

at Camping World Stadium, Orlando, FL

- Date: December 28
- Game time: 5:15 p.m.
- TV announcers (ESPN): Dave Flemming, Rod Gilmore, and Quint Kessenich
- http://506sports.com/ncaaf.php

== Rankings ==
Ranking movements Legend: ██ Increase in ranking ██ Decrease in ranking
	Week															
Poll	Pre	1	2	3	4	5	6	7	8	9	10	11	12	13	14	Final
AP	17	14	14	12	12	9	6	13	13	12	7	7	12	15	15	20
Coaches	20	17	15	13	12	8	6	13	12	10	8	7	12	16	16	22
CFP	Not released									13	9	9	13	16	16	Not released

== Players drafted into the NFL ==
Round	Pick	Player	Position	NFL Club
3	100	Will Grier	QB	Carolina Panthers
3	101	Yodny Cajuste	OT	New England Patriots
4	120	Gary Jennings Jr.	WR	Seattle Seahawks
4	121	Trevon Wesco	TE	New York Jets
6	188	David Long Jr.	LB	Tennessee Titans
