= Derrek Pitts =

American football player (born 1998)

Derrek Pitts Jr.
Profile
- Position: Cornerback

Personal information
- Born: August 8, 1998 (age 28); Baltimore, Maryland, U.S.
- Listed height: 6 ft 0 in (1.83 m)
- Listed weight: 177 lb (80 kg)

Career information
- High school: South Charleston (South Charleston, West Virginia)
- College: West Virginia (2017–2018); Marshall (2019–2020); NC State (2021–2022)
- NFL draft: 2023: undrafted

Career history
- Tampa Bay Buccaneers (2023)

Career NFL statistics as of Week 4, 2023
- Total tackles: 2
- Sacks: 0
- Interceptions: 0
- Stats at Pro Football Reference

Derrek Pitts Jr. (born August 8, 1998) is an American football cornerback. He played college football at West Virginia, Marshall and NC State and was signed as an undrafted free agent by the Buccaneers after the 2023 NFL draft.

== Early life ==
Pitts was born in Baltimore, Maryland and played high school football at South Charleston High School in South Charleston, West Virginia.

== College career ==
Pitts first attended West Virginia University where he played college football for the Mountaineers, then he transferred to Marshall University where he played for the Thundering Herd, and finally he transferred once again to North Carolina State University, and playing with the NC State Wolfpack. He played two seasons with each team.

== Professional career ==
After not being drafted in the 2023 NFL draft, Pitts was signed by the Tampa Bay Buccaneers as an undrafted free agent on May 12, 2023. On August 29, 2023, the Buccaneers announced that he had made the initial 53-man roster.

In Week 3 against the Philadelphia Eagles, Pitts recorded his first NFL tackles, one solo and one assist. He was waived on October 25, 2023 and re-signed to the practice squad. He was not signed to a reserve/future contract after the season and thus became a free agent when his practice squad contract expired.
