= Arthur Maulet =

American football player (born 1993)

No. 37, 32, 23, 35, 10, 27
- Position: Cornerback

Personal information
- Born: July 13, 1993 (age 33); New Orleans, Louisiana, U.S.
- Listed height: 5 ft 9 in (1.75 m)
- Listed weight: 190 lb (86 kg)

Career information
- High school: Bonnabel (Kenner, Louisiana)
- College: Copiah–Lincoln CC (2013–2014); Memphis (2015–2016)
- NFL draft: 2017: undrafted

Career history
- New Orleans Saints (2017–2018); Indianapolis Colts (2018); New Orleans Saints (2018)*; New York Jets (2019–2020); Pittsburgh Steelers (2021–2022); Baltimore Ravens (2023–2024); Houston Texans (2025)*; Detroit Lions (2025)
- * Offseason or practice squad member only

Career NFL statistics
- Total tackles: 239
- Sacks: 5
- Forced fumbles: 2
- Fumble recoveries: 3
- Interceptions: 5
- Pass deflections: 18
- Defensive touchdowns: 1
- Stats at Pro Football Reference

Arthur Maulet (/mɑːˈlɛt/ mah-LET; born July 13, 1993) is an American former professional football cornerback. He played college football for the Copiah–Lincoln Wolves and Memphis Tigers, and was signed by the New Orleans Saints as an undrafted free agent in 2017. He has also been a member of the Indianapolis Colts, New York Jets, Pittsburgh Steelers, Baltimore Ravens, and Detroit Lions.

== College career ==
As a senior at Memphis, Maulet played in all 13 games and recorded 73 tackles, 7.5 tackles for loss, 4.5 sacks, two interceptions, 15 passes defended and two forced fumbles.

== Professional career ==
Pre-draft measurables
| Height | Weight | Arm length | Hand span | 40-yard dash | 10-yard split | 20-yard split | 20-yard shuttle | Three-cone drill | Vertical jump | Broad jump | Bench press |
|---|---|---|---|---|---|---|---|---|---|---|---|
| 5 ft 9 3/4 in (1.77 m) | 189 lb (86 kg) | 31 1/4 in (0.79 m) | 9 5/8 in (0.24 m) | 4.62 s | 1.60 s | 2.69 s | 4.34 s | 7.12 s | 36.5 in (0.93 m) | 10 ft 3 in (3.12 m) | 18 reps |
All values from NFL Combine/Pro Day

=== New Orleans Saints (first stint) ===
Maulet signed with the New Orleans Saints as an undrafted free agent on May 1, 2017. He was waived on September 2, 2017, and was signed to the Saints' practice squad the next day. He was promoted to the active roster on September 23, 2017, but was waived two days later and re-signed to the practice squad. He was promoted back to the active roster on December 2, 2017.

On September 21, 2018, Maulet was waived by the Saints.

=== Indianapolis Colts ===
On September 24, 2018, Maulet was claimed off waivers by the Indianapolis Colts. He was waived on November 20, 2018.

=== New Orleans Saints (second stint) ===
On November 26, 2018, Maulet was signed to the Saints practice squad.

=== New York Jets ===
On January 29, 2019, Maulet signed a reserve/future contract with the New York Jets. In Week 3 against the New England Patriots, Maulet recovered a fumble by punt returner Gunner Olszewski in the endzone for a touchdown as the Jets lost 30-14. He was waived on October 15 and re-signed to the practice squad. He was promoted to the active roster on October 30.

Maulet re-signed with the Jets on May 6, 2020. He was placed on injured reserve on September 22, 2020 with a groin injury. He was activated on October 31.

In Week 11 against the Los Angeles Chargers, Maulet recorded his first career sack on Justin Herbert during the 34–28 loss.

=== Pittsburgh Steelers ===
The Pittsburgh Steelers signed Maulet to a one-year contract on May 7, 2021.

On March 14, 2022, Maulet signed a two-year contract extension with the Steelers.

Maulet was released on May 10, 2023.

=== Baltimore Ravens ===
The Baltimore Ravens signed Maulet to a one-year contract on July 25, 2023. He played in 14 games with three starts as a slot corner and blitzer, recording 37 tackles, five passes defensed, and one interception.

On March 19, 2024, Maulet signed a two-year contract extension with the Ravens. He was placed on injured reserve on August 27 due to a knee injury. He was activated on October 22. He was placed on injured reserve again on November 30 due to calf and knee injuries. Maulet was released by the Ravens on March 12, 2025.

=== Houston Texans ===
On July 23, 2025, Maulet signed with the Houston Texans. He was released on August 26 as part of final roster cuts.

=== Detroit Lions ===
On October 8, 2025, Maulet signed with the Detroit Lions' practice squad. He was promoted to the active roster on October 20. In a Week 7 24-9 win against the Tampa Bay Buccaneers, playing in an injury-depleted Lions secondary, Maulet took the ball from Buccaneers tight end Cade Otton for his fifth career interception. He was released by the Lions on November 25. On December 9, Maulet was re-signed to the active roster.

=== Retirement ===
On November 4, 2026, Maulet announced his retirement according to Cameron Wolfe on X.
