= Marcus Simms =

American football player (born 1997)

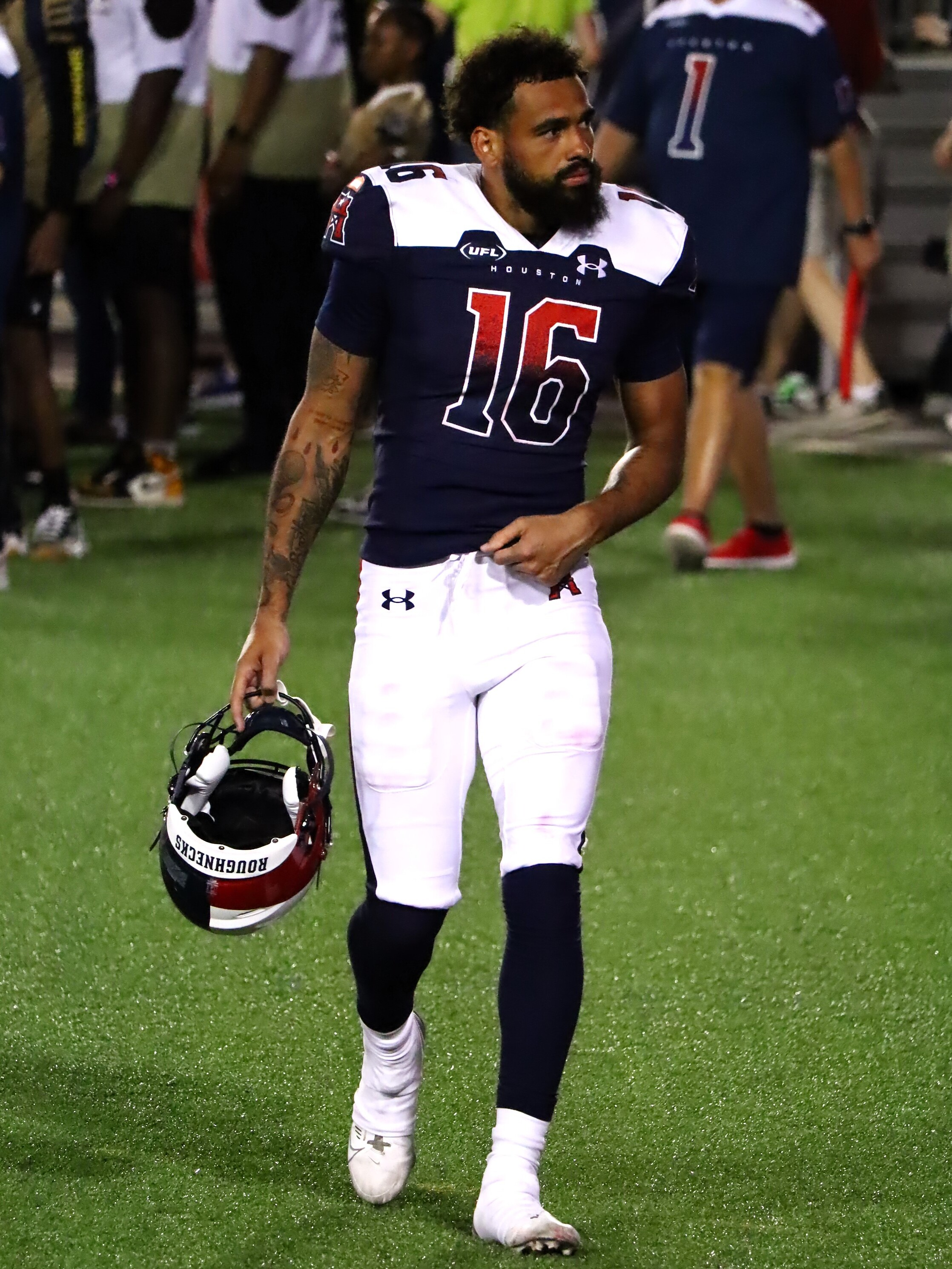
- Simms with the Houston Roughnecks in 2025

Profile
- Position: Wide receiver

Personal information
- Born: December 18, 1997 (age 28); Bowie, Maryland, U.S.
- Listed height: 6 ft 0 in (1.83 m)
- Listed weight: 197 lb (89 kg)

Career information
- High school: Sherwood (Sandy Spring, Maryland)
- College: West Virginia (2016–2018)
- NFL draft: 2019: undrafted

Career history
- Jacksonville Jaguars (2019)*; Michigan Panthers (2022–2024); Seattle Seahawks (2024); Michigan Panthers (2025); Houston Roughnecks / Gamblers (2025); Birmingham Stallions (2026)*
- * Offseason or practice squad member only

Awards and highlights
- All-UFL Team (2024); Second-team All-All-Big 12 (2017)

Career UFL statistics as of 2024
- Receptions: 23
- Receiving yards: 426
- Receiving touchdowns: 3
- Return yards: 201
- Stats at Pro Football Reference

Marcus Simms (born December 18, 1997) is an American professional football wide receiver. He played college football at West Virginia and was signed by the Jacksonville Jaguars as an undrafted free agent in 2019.

== College career ==
Simms played college football at West Virginia, where he played in 33 games. He had 87 receptions for 1,457 yards and eight touchdowns. He also had two rushing attempts for four yards, as well as 41 kick returns for 992 yards and 23 punt returns for 157 yards.

== Professional career ==
Pre-draft measurables
Height	Weight
5 ft 11 3/4 in (1.82 m)	195 lb (88 kg)
Values from Pro Day

=== Jacksonville Jaguars ===
After going undrafted in the 2019 NFL draft, on July 11, 2019, Simms signed a 3-year, $1.775 million contract with the Jacksonville Jaguars. He was waived/injured on August 19 and was placed on IR due to a concussion on August 31. On November 22, Simms was waived.

=== Seattle Seahawks ===
On July 23, 2024, Simms signed a one-year contract with the Seattle Seahawks. He was waived/injured on August 7, 2024.

=== Michigan Panthers (second stint) ===
On January 10, 2025, Simms re-signed with the Michigan Panthers of the United Football League (UFL).

=== Houston Roughnecks ===
On April 7, 2025, Simms was traded to the Houston Roughnecks for offensive tackle Cam Carter.

=== Birmingham Stallions ===
On January 13, 2026, Simms was drafted by the Birmingham Stallions. He was released on March 19.
