= Trevon Wesco =

American football player (born 1995)

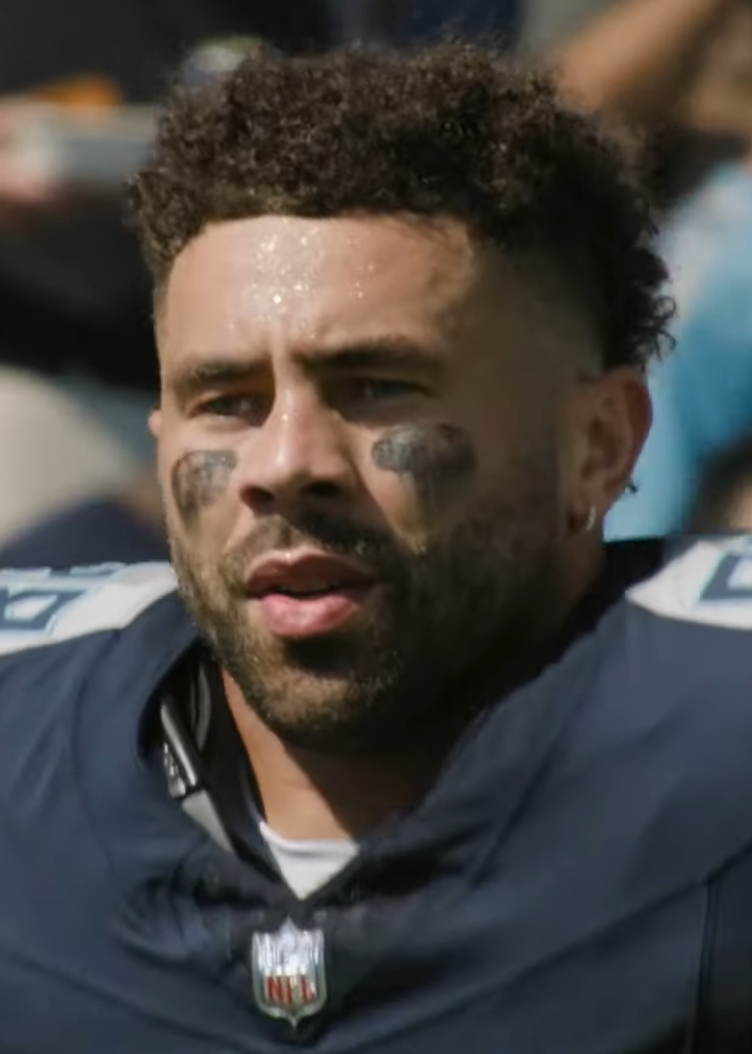
- Wesco with the Tennessee Titans in 2023

Profile
- Position: Tight end

Personal information
- Born: September 12, 1995 (age 31); Martinsburg, West Virginia, U.S.
- Listed height: 6 ft 3 in (1.91 m)
- Listed weight: 267 lb (121 kg)

Career information
- High school: Musselman (Inwood, West Virginia)
- College: Lackawanna (2014–2015); West Virginia (2016–2018)
- NFL draft: 2019: 4th round, 121st overall pick

Career history
- New York Jets (2019–2021); Chicago Bears (2022); Tennessee Titans (2023); Las Vegas Raiders (2024)*
- * Offseason or practice squad member only

Awards and highlights
- First-team All-Big 12 (2018)

Career NFL statistics as of 2023
- Receptions: 9
- Receiving yards: 134
- Stats at Pro Football Reference

Trevon Wesco (born September 12, 1995) is an American professional football tight end. He played college football at Lackawanna College and West Virginia, and was selected by the Jets in the fourth round of the 2019 NFL draft.

== Professional career ==
Pre-draft measurables
Height	Weight	Arm length	Hand span	40-yard dash	10-yard split	20-yard split	20-yard shuttle	Three-cone drill	Vertical jump	Broad jump	Bench press
6 ft 3 1/2 in (1.92 m)	267 lb (121 kg)	34 3/4 in (0.88 m)	9 1/2 in (0.24 m)	4.89 s	1.71 s	2.84 s	4.38 s	7.18 s	31.0 in (0.79 m)	9 ft 9 in (2.97 m)	24 reps
All values from NFL Combine

=== New York Jets ===
Wesco was drafted by the New York Jets in the fourth round with the 121st overall pick in the 2019 NFL draft. Throughout his rookie year, Wesco was largely used as a fullback, though he would occasionally play as a tight end.

On November 9, 2020, Wesco was placed on injured reserve. He was activated on December 12, 2020.

Wesco entered the 2021 season as the third-string tight end behind Ryan Griffin and Tyler Kroft. He suffered a knee injury in Week 16 and was placed on injured reserve on December 27. He finished the season with three catches for 35 and no touchdowns through 12 games and seven starts. He was released by the Jets on August 30, 2022, as a part of roster cuts.

=== Chicago Bears ===
On August 31, 2022, Wesco was claimed off waivers by the Chicago Bears.

=== Tennessee Titans ===
On March 31, 2023, Wesco signed a one-year deal with the Tennessee Titans.

=== Las Vegas Raiders ===
On October 22, 2024, Wesco was signed to the Las Vegas Raiders practice squad. He was released on November 19.
