= 2022 Kansas State Wildcats football team =

American college football season

2022 Kansas State Wildcats football

Big 12 champion

Big 12 Championship, W 31–28 ^{OT} vs. TCU

Sugar Bowl, L 20–45 vs. Alabama
- Conference: Big 12 Conference

Ranking
- Coaches: No. 14
- AP: No. 14
- Record: 10–4 (7–2 Big 12)
- Head coach: Chris Klieman (4th season)
- Offensive coordinator: Collin Klein (1st season)
- Offensive scheme: Pro spread
- Defensive coordinator: Joe Klanderman (3rd season)
- Base defense: 3–3–5
- Home stadium: Bill Snyder Family Football Stadium

Uniform
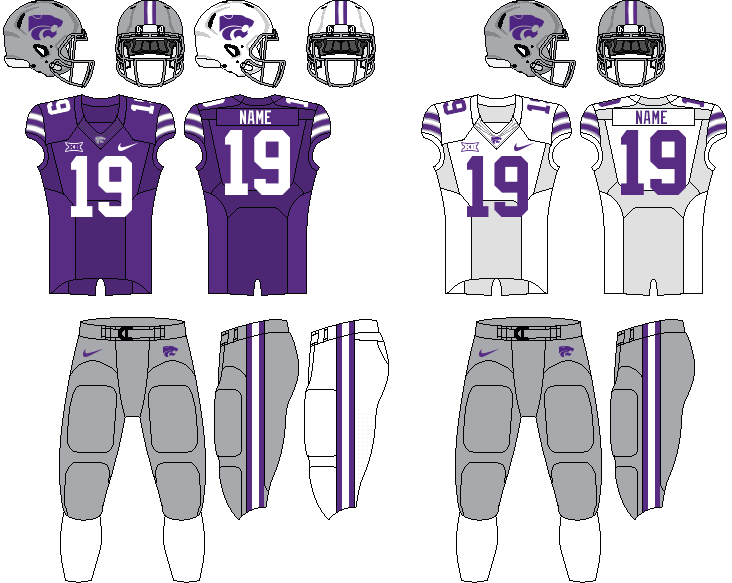

2022 Big 12 Conference football standings
	Conf.			Overall
Team	W		L	W		L
No. 2 TCU y^	9	–	0	13	–	2
No. 14 Kansas State y$	7	–	2	10	–	4
No. 25 Texas	6	–	3	8	–	5
Texas Tech	5	–	4	8	–	5
Oklahoma State	4	–	5	7	–	6
Baylor	4	–	5	6	–	7
Oklahoma	3	–	6	6	–	7
Kansas	3	–	6	6	–	7
West Virginia	3	–	6	5	–	7
Iowa State	1	–	8	4	–	8
Championship: Kansas State 31, TCU 28 ^{OT}
^ – College Football Playoff participant; $ – Conference champion; y – Championship game participant; Rankings from AP Poll

The 2022 Kansas State Wildcats football team represented Kansas State University in the 2022 NCAA Division I FBS football season. The Wildcats played their home games at Bill Snyder Family Football Stadium in Manhattan, Kansas, and competed in the Big 12 Conference. They were led by fourth-year head coach Chris Klieman.

The Wildcats improved on their 8–5 performance the previous year by virtue of defeating in-state rival Kansas 47–27 on November 26. The following week, the Wildcats defeated 3rd-ranked TCU in the 2022 Big 12 Championship Game, securing their first conference title since 2012 and seventh overall.

== Preseason ==
=== Award watch lists ===
Listed in the order that they were released

Award	Player	Position	Year
Lott Trophy	Felix Anudike-Uzomah	DE	Jr.
Maxwell Award	Deuce Vaughn	RB	Jr.
Bednarik Award	Felix Anudike-Uzomah	DE	Jr.
Doak Walker Award	Deuce Vaughn	RB	Jr.
Jim Thorpe Award	JuJu Brents	CB	Sr.
Outland Trophy	Cooper Beebe	OL	Jr.
Bronko Nagurski Trophy	Felix Anudike-Uzomah	DE	Jr.
Wuerffel Trophy	Will Howard	QB	Jr.
Walter Camp Award	Deuce Vaughn	RB	Jr.
Rotary Lombardi Award	Felix Anudike-Uzomah Cooper Beebe	DE OL	Jr. Jr.
Patrick Mannelly Award	Randen Plattner	LS	Sr.
Paul Hornung Award	Malik Knowles	WR	Sr.
Ray Guy Award	Ty Zentner	P/K	Sr.

=== Big 12 media poll ===
The preseason poll was released on July 7, 2022.

- First place votes in ()

Big 12 media poll
Predicted finish	Team	Votes (1st place)
1	Baylor (17)	365
2	Oklahoma (12)	354
3	Oklahoma State (9)	342
4	Texas (2)	289
5	Kansas State	261
6	Iowa State (1)	180
7	TCU	149
8	West Virginia	147
9	Texas Tech	119
10	Kansas	48

=== Preseason Big-12 awards ===
2022 Preseason All-Big 12 teams

Big 12 Defensive Player of the Year
Player	No.	Position	Class	Source
Felix Anudike-Uzomah	91	DL	Junior	

Position	Player	Class
Offense
RB	Deuce Vaughn	Junior
OL	Cooper Beebe	Junior
PK/KR	Malik Knowles	Senior
Defense
DL	Felix Anudike-Uzomah	Junior
LB	Daniel Green	Senior
DB	JuJu Brents	Senior

== Schedule ==
Kansas State and the Big 12 announced the 2022 football schedule on December 1, 2021.

Date	Time	Opponent	Rank	Site	TV	Result	Attendance
September 3	6:00 p.m.	South Dakota*		Bill Snyder Family Football Stadium; Manhattan, KS	ESPN+	W 34–0	50,469
September 10	11:00 a.m.	Missouri*		Bill Snyder Family Football Stadium; Manhattan, KS	ESPN2	W 40–12	51,806
September 17	2:00 p.m.	Tulane*		Bill Snyder Family Football Stadium; Manhattan, KS	ESPN+	L 10–17	50,887
September 24	7:00 p.m.	at No. 6 Oklahoma		Gaylord Family Oklahoma Memorial Stadium; Norman, OK (rivalry)	FOX	W 41–34	84,376
October 1	11:00 a.m.	Texas Tech	No. 25	Bill Snyder Family Football Stadium; Manhattan, KS	ESPN+	W 37–28	50,782
October 8	6:30 p.m.	at Iowa State	No. 20	Jack Trice Stadium; Ames, IA (rivalry)	ESPNU	W 10–9	60,561
October 22	7:00 p.m.	at No. 8 TCU	No. 17	Amon G. Carter Stadium; Fort Worth, TX	FS1	L 28–38	47,881
October 29	2:30 p.m.	No. 9 Oklahoma State^{†}	No. 22	Bill Snyder Family Football Stadium; Manhattan, KS	FOX	W 48–0	51,133
November 5	6:00 p.m.	No. 24 Texas	No. 13	Bill Snyder Family Football Stadium; Manhattan, KS	FS1	L 27–34	51,216
November 12	6:00 p.m.	at Baylor	No. 19	McLane Stadium; Waco, TX	FS1	W 31–3	47,686
November 19	1:00 p.m.	at West Virginia	No. 15	Milan Puskar Stadium; Morgantown, WV	ESPN+	W 48–31	37,055
November 26	7:00 p.m.	Kansas	No. 12	Bill Snyder Family Football Stadium; Manhattan, KS (Sunflower Showdown)	FOX	W 47–27	51,861
December 3	11:00 a.m.	vs. No. 3 TCU	No. 10	AT&T Stadium; Arlington, TX (Big 12 Championship Game/College GameDay)	ABC	W 31–28 ^{OT}	69,335
December 31	11:00 a.m.	vs. No. 5 Alabama*	No. 9	Caesars Superdome; New Orleans, LA (Sugar Bowl)	ESPN	L 20–45	60,437
*Non-conference game; ^{†}Homecoming; Rankings from AP Poll (and CFP Rankings, after November 1) - Released prior to game; All times are in Central time

== Game summaries ==
=== South Dakota ===
Team	1	2	3	4	Total
South Dakota	0	0	0	0	0
• Kansas State	20	7	7	0	34

- Date: September 3
- Location: Bill Snyder Family Football Stadium, (Manhattan, KS)
- Game start: 6:00 p.m. CDT
- Game attendance: 50,469
- Game weather: 88 degrees, sunny, wind N at 10mph
- Referee: Steve Baron
- TV announcers (ESPN+): James Westling (play-by-play), LaDarrin McLane (analyst), Tori Petry (reporter)
- Sources: ESPN Box Score K-State Box Score

Statistics	South Dakota	Kansas State
First downs	13	19
Total yards	270	392
Rushes/yards	35/131	45/297
Passing yards	139	95
Passing: Comp–Att–Int	18–34–1	15–19–0
Turnovers	1	0
Time of possession	27:41	32:19
Penalties−yards	9−75	4−34

Team	Category	Player	Statistics
South Dakota	Passing	Carson Camp	18/34, 139 YDS, 1 INT
South Dakota	Rushing	Shomari Lawrence	14 CAR, 84 YDS, 17 Long
South Dakota	Receiving	Jack Martens	2 REC, 35 YDS, 22 Long
Kansas State	Passing	Adrian Martinez	11/15, 53 YDS
Kansas State	Rushing	Deuce Vaughn	18 CAR, 126 YDS, 1 TD, 39 Long
Kansas State	Receiving	Will Swanson	2 REC, 23 YDS, 18 Long

Scoring summary

Quarter	Time	Drive			Team	Scoring information	Score	
Quarter	Time	Plays	Yards	TOP	Team	Scoring information	USD	KSU
1st	14:30	1	75	0:10	KSU	Malik Knowles 75-yard touchdown run, Chris Tennant kick good	0	7
1st	8:14				KSU	Punt returned 17 yards for touchdown by Desmond Purnell, Chris Tennant kick good	0	14
1st	0:49	5	63	1:28	KSU	Deuce Vaughn 39-yard touchdown run, Chris Tennant kick failed	0	20
2nd	5:49	8	78	3:28	KSU	Adrian Martinez 6-yard touchdown run, Chris Tennant kick good	0	27
3rd	8:43	11	63	4:55	KSU	DJ Giddens 12-yard touchdown run, Chris Tennant kick good	0	34
"TOP" = time of possession. For other American football terms, see Glossary of American football.							USD 0	KSU 34

Kansas State's season opener produced an official 50,469 fans and its first sellout crowd since 2019. Kansas State did hold back a number of players on injured reserve, including linebackers Will Honas and Shawn Robinson, as well as safeties Josh Hayes and TJ Smith. Highlights included the Wildcats blocking a punt and running it in for a touchdown, what was called an "impressive" ground game, and Malik Knowles scored the earliest touchdown in school history just ten seconds into the game. Kansas State won the game 34-0. Coach Chris Klieman said about the shutout, “It’s really rare in college football so we are all really excited about it.”

=== Missouri ===
Team	1	2	3	4	Total
Missouri	3	0	3	6	12
• Kansas State	7	13	6	14	40

- Date: September 10
- Location: Bill Snyder Family Football Stadium, (Manhattan, KS)
- Game start: 11:00 a.m. CDT
- Game attendance: 51,806
- Game weather: 60 degrees, cloudy, wind N at 10mph
- Referee: James Carter
- TV announcers (ESPN2): Beth Mowins (play-by-play), Kirk Morrison (analyst), Stormy Buonantony (reporter)
- Sources: ESPN Box Score Team Stats K-State Box Score

Statistics	Missouri	Kansas State
First downs	14	18
Total yards	222	336
Rushes/yards	35/94	43/235
Passing yards	128	101
Passing: Comp–Att–Int	15–31–4	9–20–0
Turnovers	4	1
Time of possession	27:59	32:01
Penalties−yards	8−46	8−68

Team	Category	Player	Statistics
Missouri	Passing	Brady Cook	15/27, 128 YDS, 2 INT
Missouri	Rushing	Brady Cook	13 CAR, 56 YDS, 11 Long
Missouri	Receiving	Dominic Lovett	3 REC, 66 YDS, 39 Long
Kansas State	Passing	Adrian Martinez	9/20, 101 YDS
Kansas State	Rushing	Deuce Vaughn	24 CAR, 145 YDS, 2 TD, 29 Long
Kansas State	Receiving	Phillip Brooks	3 REC, 57 yards, 28 Long

Scoring summary

Quarter	Time	Drive			Team	Scoring information	Score	
Quarter	Time	Plays	Yards	TOP	Team	Scoring information	MIZ	KSU
1st	9:20	11	44	5:40	MIZ	49-yard field goal by Harrison Mevis	3	0
1st	4:16	11	75	4:58	KSU	Deuce Vaughn 1-yard touchdown run, Chris Tennant kick good	3	7
2nd	13:29	10	49	4:22	KSU	Adrian Martinez 16-yard touchdown run, Chris Tennant kick good	3	14
2nd	6:42				KSU	Punt returned 76 yards for touchdown by Phillip Brooks, Chris Tennant kick blocked	3	20
3rd	10:17	8	54	2:16	MIZ	44-yard field goal by Harrison Mevis	6	20
3rd	6:58	6	16	2:22	KSU	35-yard field goal by Chris Tennant	6	23
3rd	0:35	4	0	1:20	KSU	37-yard field goal by Chris Tennant	6	26
4th	12:52	4	59	2:02	KSU	Deuce Vaughn 24-yard touchdown run, Chris Tennant kick good	6	33
4th	2:33	10	63	6:46	KSU	DJ Giddens 28-yard touchdown run, Chris Tennant kick good	6	40
4th	0:00	6	20	1:10	MIZ	Cody Schrader 1-yard touchdown run, kick is no attempt/End of Game	12	40
"TOP" = time of possession. For other American football terms, see Glossary of American football.							MIZ 12	KSU 40

Kansas State and Mizzou have a history of 97 previous football games, but when Mizzou left the Big 12 conference to join the SEC, they ceased playing each other. Kansas State won that last meeting in 2011 with a final score of 24-17 in Manhattan, but Missouri leads the overall series 60-32-5.

Game Time arrived but a weather delay at the beginning and one hour-long delay later in the middle of the game slowed the action. The game started with light rain which grew to more storms. Through the weather, Missouri scored first with a field goal in the first quarter, but following a Kansas State touchdown on the next series, the Wildcats led the rest of the game.

Kansas State highlights included a 76-yard punt return for a touchdown by Phillip Brooks, just two plays after play resumed from the second weather delay. Credit was also given to Kansas State's defense and their ability to overwhelm the Missouri offensive line leading to pressure on Missouri's passing offense.

The Missouri Defense held Kansas State to 89 yards rushing and 14 points in the first half. Missouri did finally score a touchdown on the last play of the game, but it was far from enough. Kansas State won 40-12 for the first meeting of the program since 2011.

=== Tulane ===
Team	1	2	3	4	Total
• Tulane	7	0	3	7	17
Kansas State	0	10	0	0	10

- Date: September 17
- Location: Bill Snyder Family Football Stadium, (Manhattan, KS)
- Game start: 2:00 p.m. CDT
- Game attendance: 50,887
- Game weather: 91 degrees, sunny, wind S at 17mph
- Referee: Hank Johns
- TV announcers (ESPN+): Mark Neely (play-by-play), Todd Doxzon (analyst), Shane Sparks (sideline)
- Sources: K-State Box Score

Statistics	Tulane	Kansas State
First downs	18	15
Total yards	336	336
Rushes/yards	40/160	42/186
Passing yards	176	150
Passing: Comp–Att–Int	13–26–2	21–31–0
Turnovers	2	0
Time of possession	28:17	31:43
Penalties−yards	3−25	5−23

Team	Category	Player	Statistics
Tulane	Passing	Michael Pratt	13/26, 176 YDS, 1 TD, 2 INT
Tulane	Rushing	Michael Pratt	13 CAR, 87 YDS, 24 Long
Tulane	Receiving	Duece Watts	3 REC, 60 YDS, 23 Long
Kansas State	Passing	Adrian Martinez	21/31, 150 YDS, 1 TD
Kansas State	Rushing	Deuce Vaughn	20 CAR, 81 YDS, 26 Long
Kansas State	Receiving	Malik Knowles	5 REC, 52 YDS, 19 Long

Scoring summary

Quarter	Time	Drive			Team	Scoring information	Score	
Quarter	Time	Plays	Yards	TOP	Team	Scoring information	TUL	KSU
1st	3:13	9	91	3:32	TUL	Tyjae Spears 1-yard touchdown run, Kriston Esnard kick good	7	0
2nd	2:43	8	75	3:23	KSU	Kade Warner 21-yard touchdown reception from Adrian Martinez, Chris Tennant kick good	7	7
2nd	0:00	6	19	0:28	KSU	22-yard field goal by Chris Tennant	7	10
3rd	8:51	7	53	3:20	TUL	30-yard field goal by Kriston Esnard	10	10
4th	4:27	5	52	2:11	TUL	Tyrick James 4-yard touchdown reception from Michael Pratt, Kriston Esnard kick good	17	10
"TOP" = time of possession. For other American football terms, see Glossary of American football.							TUL 17	KSU 10

Kansas State was a heavy favorite coming into the game and was stunned at home in losing to Tulane, 17-10. The offense gained just 336 yards while going 2 of 15 on third downs and 1 of 5 on fourth downs.

=== No. 6 Oklahoma ===
Team	1	2	3	4	Total
• Kansas State	14	10	3	14	41
No. 6 Oklahoma	7	10	3	14	34

- Date: September 24
- Location: Gaylord Family Oklahoma Memorial Stadium, (Norman, OK)
- Game start: 7:00 p.m. CDT
- Game attendance: 84,376
- Game weather: 81 degrees, mostly cloudy, wind S at 10mph
- Referee: Kevin Mar
- TV announcers (FOX): Jason Benetti (play-by-play), Brock Huard (analyst), Allison Williams (reporter)
- Sources: K-State Box Score

Statistics	Kansas State	Oklahoma
First downs	28	26
Total yards	509	550
Rushes/yards	49/275	34/220
Passing yards	234	330
Passing: Comp–Att–Int	21–34–0	26–39–0
Turnovers	0	0
Time of possession	35:04	24:56
Penalties−yards	6−37	11−87

Team	Category	Player	Statistics
Kansas State	Passing	Adrian Martinez	21/34, 234 YDS, 1 TD
Kansas State	Rushing	Adrian Martinez	21 CAR, 148 YDS, 4 TD, 55 Long
Kansas State	Receiving	Ben Sinnott	4 REC, 80 YDS, 27 Long
Oklahoma	Passing	Dillon Gabriel	26/39, 330 YDS, 4 TD
Oklahoma	Rushing	Eric Gray	16 CAR, 114 YDS, 25 Long
Oklahoma	Receiving	Marvin Mims	4 REC, 87 YDS, 1 TD, 50 Long

Scoring summary

Quarter	Time	Drive			Team	Scoring information	Score	
Quarter	Time	Plays	Yards	TOP	Team	Scoring information	KSU	OU
1st	9:57	12	75	5:03	KSU	Adrian Martinez 6-yard touchdown run, Chris Tennant kick good	7	0
1st	5:37	7	80	3:11	KSU	Malik Knowles 6-yard touchdown reception from Adrian Martinez, Chris Tennant kick good	14	0
1st	2:32	3	70	0:52	OU	Theo Wease 56-yard touchdown reception from Dillon Gabriel, Zach Schmit kick good	14	7
2nd	12:24	4	63	1:09	OU	Marvin Mims 50-yard touchdown reception from Dillon Gabriel, Zach Schmit kick good	14	14
2nd	6:15	11	42	5:59	KSU	Adrian Matinez 3-yard touchdown run, Chris Tennant kick good	21	14
2nd	2:47	8	51	3:28	OU	41-yard field goal by Zach Schmit	21	17
2nd	0:00	10	70	2:47	KSU	23-yard field goal by Chris Tennant	24	17
3rd	11:42	8	48	3:18	OU	44-yard field goal by Zach Schmit	24	20
3rd	3:24	11	69	3:53	KSU	29-yard field goal by Chris Tennant	27	20
4th	8:00	8	80	3:45	KSU	Adrian Martinez 15-yard touchdown run, Chris Tennant kick good	34	20
4th	4:36	9	75	3:24	OU	Brayden Willis 1-yard touchdown reception from Dillon Gabriel, Zach Schmit kick good	34	27
4th	1:58	7	75	2:38	KSU	Adrian Martinez 1-yard touchdown run, Chris Tennant kick good	41	27
4th	0:35	12	75	1:23	OU	Brayden Willis 10-yard touchdown reception from Dillon Gabriel, Zach Schmit kick good	41	34
"TOP" = time of possession. For other American football terms, see Glossary of American football.							KSU 41	OU 34

Coming into the game as two-touchdown underdogs, K-State looked to rebound in a big way from a frustrating loss the week before against Tulane. The Wildcats jumped out to an excellent start, taking a 14-0 lead less than ten minutes into the contest on an Adrian Martinez touchdown run, followed by a TD pass to Malik Knowles.

Oklahoma, though, rallied with consecutive quick-strike touchdown drives (both scoring plays were over 50 yards) to tie the game at 14 each early in the second quarter. K-State, however, received a 58-yard kick return from Knowles to set up a short field, which Martinez converted into his second touchdown run, putting K-State back up 21-14. The Wildcats led the rest of the game from that point.

After both teams traded field goals to go into halftime with K-State ahead 24-17, the two squads again traded field goals as the only scores of the third quarter. In the fourth, K-State finally found the end zone again as Martinez scampered in from 15 yards out to put K-State ahead 34-20 with eight minutes to play. Oklahoma answered with a TD march to cut the deficit back to a touchdown, but K-State had the decisive answer.

Facing 3rd-and-16, Martinez scrambled for 55 yards down to the Oklahoma 4 yard line. Two plays later, he scored from a yard out for his fourth rushing touchdown of the night with 1:58 left to put K-State ahead 41-27. Oklahoma drove downfield and scored with 35 seconds left, but K-State recovered an onside kick to secure the win.

Martinez finished the night with 148 yards on the ground, the most by a K-State QB since 2016. Deuce Vaughn added 115 yards on the ground as well as K-State had two 100-yard rushers for the first time since the 2017 Cactus Bowl. K-State also defeated Oklahoma for the third time in four seasons. Postgame, Martinez said, "It's without a doubt my favorite game of all time."

=== Texas Tech ===
Team	1	2	3	4	Total
Texas Tech	0	10	10	8	28
• No. 25 Kansas State	13	0	7	17	37

- Date: October 1
- Location: Bill Snyder Family Football Stadium, (Manhattan, KS)
- Game start: 11:00 a.m. CDT
- Game attendance: 50,782
- Game weather: 62 degrees, sunny, wind E at 7mph
- Referee: Scott Campbell
- TV announcers (ESPN+): Mark Neely (play-by-play), Ryan Leaf (analyst), Shane Sparks (reporter)
- Sources: K-State Box Score

Statistics	Texas Tech	Kansas State
First downs	26	15
Total yards	473	459
Rushes/yards	34/114	39/343
Passing yards	359	116
Passing: Comp–Att–Int	34–48–2	12–19–0
Turnovers	4	1
Time of possession	32:26	27:34
Penalties−yards	5−40	5−47

Team	Category	Player	Statistics
Texas Tech	Passing	Donovan Smith	34/48, 359 YDS, 2 TD, 2 INT
Texas Tech	Rushing	SaRodorick Thompson	6 CAR, 55 YDS, 23 Long
Texas Tech	Receiving	Xavier White	9 REC, 120 YDS, 1 TD, 26 Long
Kansas State	Passing	Adrian Martinez	12/19, 116 YDS, 1 TD
Kansas State	Rushing	Adrian Martinez	12 CAR, 171 YDS, 3 TD, 69 Long
Kansas State	Receiving	Kade Warner	3 REC, 47 YDS, 20 Long

Scoring summary

Quarter	Time	Drive			Team	Scoring information	Score	
Quarter	Time	Plays	Yards	TOP	Team	Scoring information	TTU	KSU
1st	14:20	2	75	0:40	KSU	Adrian Martinez 18-yard touchdown run, Chris Tennant kick good	0	7
1st	4:57	14	72	6:19	KSU	29-yard field goal by Chris Tennant	0	10
1st	0:24	6	25	3:01	KSU	26-yard field goal by Chris Tennant	0	13
2nd	1:24	9	86	4:38	TTU	Nehemiah Martinez 6-yard touchdown reception from Donovan Smith, Trey Wolff kick good	7	13
2nd	0:00	4	37	0:32	TTU	51-yard field goal by Trey Wolff	10	13
3rd	7:14	8	46	2:42	TTU	39-yard field goal by Trey Wolff	13	13
3rd	6:04	2	77	1:03	KSU	Phillip Brooks 18-yard touchdown reception from Adrian Martinez, Chris Tennant kick good	13	20
3rd	3:08	7	75	2:56	TTU	Xavier White 12-yard touchdown reception from Donovan Smith, Trey Wolff kick good	20	20
4th	13:34	3	76	1:16	KSU	Adrian Martinez 69-yard touchdown run, Chris Tennant kick good	20	27
4th	9:07	6	26	2:36	KSU	32-yard field goal by Chris Tennant	20	30
4th	5:54	4	27	2:33	KSU	Adrian Martinez 12-yard touchdown run, Chris Tennant kick good	20	37
4th	2:23	13	75	3:31	TTU	Donovan Smith 3-yard touchdown run, 2-point conversion successful, Mason Tharp reception from Donovan Smith	28	37
"TOP" = time of possession. For other American football terms, see Glossary of American football.							TTU 28	KSU 37

=== Iowa State ===
Farmageddon

Team	1	2	3	4	Total
• No. 20 Kansas State	7	0	0	3	10
Iowa State	3	3	3	0	9

- Date: October 8
- Location: Jack Trice Stadium, (Ames, IA)
- Game start: 6:30 p.m. CDT
- Game attendance: 60,561
- Game weather: 60 degrees, clear, wind SW at 12mph
- Referee: Kevin Boitmann
- TV announcers (ESPNU): Clay Matvick (play-by-play), Rocky Boiman (analyst), Dawn Davenport (reporter)
- Sources: K-State Box Score

Statistics	Kansas State	Iowa State
First downs	16	13
Total yards	388	276
Rushes/yards	38/131	24/78
Passing yards	257	198
Passing: Comp–Att–Int	13–20–0	22–38–0
Turnovers	1	0
Time of possession	30:22	29:38
Penalties−yards	3−25	5−40

Team	Category	Player	Statistics
Kansas State	Passing	Adrian Martinez	12/19, 246 YDS, 1 TD
Kansas State	Rushing	Adrian Martinez	19 CAR, 77 YDS, 19 Long
Kansas State	Receiving	Phillip Brooks	4 REC, 119 YDS, 1 TD, 81 Long
Iowa State	Passing	Hunter Dekkers	22/38, 198 YDS
Iowa State	Rushing	Jirehl Brock	13 CAR, 33 YDS, 6 Long
Iowa State	Receiving	Xavier Hutchinson	8 REC, 100 YDS, 38 Long

Scoring summary

Quarter	Time	Drive			Team	Scoring information	Score	
Quarter	Time	Plays	Yards	TOP	Team	Scoring information	KSU	ISU
1st	12:23	3	86	0:54	KSU	Phillip Brooks 81-yard touchdown reception from Adrian Martinez, Chris Tennant kick good	7	0
1st	9:22	8	74	2:54	ISU	35-yard field goal by Jace Gilbert	7	3
2nd	14:47	16	69	7:43	ISU	44-yard field goal by Jace Gilbert	7	6
3rd	0:48	12	55	5:27	ISU	43-yard field goal by Jace Gilbert	7	9
4th	7:14	10	45	5:03	KSU	30-yard field goal by Chris Tennant	10	9
"TOP" = time of possession. For other American football terms, see Glossary of American football.							KSU 10	ISU 9

=== No. 8 TCU ===
Team	1	2	3	4	Total
No. 17 Kansas State	7	21	0	0	28
• No. 8 TCU	10	7	14	7	38

- Date: October 22
- Location: Amon G. Carter Stadium, (Fort Worth, TX)
- Game start: 7:00 p.m. CDT
- Game attendance: 47,881
- Game weather: 81 degrees, clear, wind SE at 22mph
- Referee: Derek Anderson
- TV announcers (FS1): Tim Brando (play-by-play), Spencer Tillman, (analyst)
- Sources: K-State Box Score

Statistics	Kansas State	TCU
First downs	15	26
Total yards	390	495
Rushes/yards	30/158	56/215
Passing yards	232	280
Passing: Comp–Att–Int	14–23–2	17–26–0
Turnovers	2	0
Time of possession	21:55	38:05
Penalties−yards	4−35	3−30

Team	Category	Player	Statistics
Kansas State	Passing	Will Howard	13/20, 225 YDS, 2 TD, 1 INT
Kansas State	Rushing	Deuce Vaughn	12 CAR, 83 YDS, 1 TD, 47 Long
Kansas State	Receiving	Malik Knowles	4 REC, 69 YDS, 37 Long
TCU	Passing	Max Duggan	17/26, 280 YDS, 3 TD
TCU	Rushing	Kendre Miller	29 CAR, 153 YDS, 2 TD, 48 Long
TCU	Receiving	Quentin Johnston	4 REC, 74 YDS, 1 TD, 55 Long

Scoring summary

Quarter	Time	Drive			Team	Scoring information	Score	
Quarter	Time	Plays	Yards	TOP	Team	Scoring information	KSU	TCU
1st	10:42	6	83	2:32	TCU	Derius Davis 65-yard touchdown reception from Max Duggan, Griffin Kell kick good	0	7
1st	9:08	4	74	1:28	KSU	Kade Warner 28-yard touchdown reception from Will Howard, Chris Tennant kick good	7	7
1st	4:49	11	48	4:12	TCU	43-yard field goal by Griffin Kell	7	10
2nd	14:56	10	75	4:53	KSU	Will Howard 1-yard touchdown run, Chris Tennant kick good	14	10
2nd	10:44	4	55	0:56	KSU	Sammy Wheeler 9-yard touchdown reception from Will Howard, Chris Tennant kick good	21	10
2nd	8:09	4	68	1:35	KSU	Deuce Vaughn 47-yard touchdown run, Chris Tennant kick good	28	10
2nd	0:20	10	91	3:12	TCU	Jared Wiley 4-yard touchdown reception from Max Duggan, Griffin Kell kick good	28	17
3rd	8:12	13	77	6:39	TCU	Kendre Miller 2-yard touchdown run, Griffin Kell kick good	28	24
3rd	3:45	4	74	1:25	TCU	Quentin Johnston 55-yard touchdown reception from Max Duggan, Griffin Kell kick good	28	31
4th	12:14	4	30	1:41	TCU	Kendre Miller 9-yard touchdown run, Griffin Kell kick good	28	38
"TOP" = time of possession. For other American football terms, see Glossary of American football.							KSU 28	TCU 38

=== No. 9 Oklahoma State ===
Team	1	2	3	4	Total
No. 9 Oklahoma State	0	0	0	0	0
• No. 22 Kansas State	14	21	3	10	48

- Date: October 29
- Location: Bill Snyder Family Football Stadium, (Manhattan, KS)
- Game start: 2:30 p.m. CDT
- Game attendance: 51,133
- Game weather: 65 degrees, sunny, wind NW at 8mph
- Referee: Scott Campbell
- TV announcers (FOX): Jason Benetti (play-by-play), Brock Huard (analyst), Allison Williams (reporter)
- Sources: K-State Box Score

Statistics	Oklahoma State	Kansas State
First downs	14	21
Total yards	217	495
Rushes/yards	30/54	37/199
Passing yards	163	296
Passing: Comp–Att–Int	15–33–2	21–37–0
Turnovers	3	0
Time of possession	24:31	35:29
Penalties−yards	4−35	7−60

Team	Category	Player	Statistics
Oklahoma State	Passing	Spencer Sanders	13/26, 147 YDS, 1 INT
Oklahoma State	Rushing	Gunnar Gundy	5 CAR, 27 YDS, 22 Long
Oklahoma State	Receiving	Brennan Presley	2 REC, 49 YDS, 29 Long
Kansas State	Passing	Will Howard	21/37, 296 YDS, 4 TD
Kansas State	Rushing	Deuce Vaughn	22 CAR, 158 YDS, 1 TD, 62 Long
Kansas State	Receiving	Malik Knowles	8 REC, 113 YDS, 28 Long

Scoring summary

Quarter	Time	Drive			Team	Scoring information	Score	
Quarter	Time	Plays	Yards	TOP	Team	Scoring information	OSU	KSU
1st	11:02	9	77	3:53	KSU	Kade Warner 38-yard touchdown reception from Will Howard, Ty Zentner kick good	0	7
1st	8:15	2	62	0:16	KSU	Deuce Vaughn 62-yard touchdown run, Ty Zentner kick good	0	14
2nd	11:17	7	83	3:32	KSU	Phillip Brooks 31-yard touchdown reception from Will Howard, Ty Zentner kick good	0	21
2nd	9:06	3	43	1:24	KSU	Kade Warner 41-yard touchdown reception from Will Howard, Ty Zentner kick good	0	28
2nd	0:07	14	77	6:35	KSU	Deuce Vaughn 1-yard touchdown reception from Will Howard, Ty Zentner kick good	0	35
3rd	4:51	10	55	4:22	KSU	23-yard field goal by Ty Zentner	0	38
4th	13:17	10	46	3:56	KSU	29-yard field goal by Ty Zentner	0	41
4th	5:43	4	19	2:33	KSU	DJ Giddens 9-yard touchdown run, Ty Zentner kick good	0	48
"TOP" = time of possession. For other American football terms, see Glossary of American football.							OSU 0	KSU 48

=== No. 24 Texas ===
Team	1	2	3	4	Total
• No. 24 Texas	14	17	0	3	34
No. 13 Kansas State	7	3	7	10	27

- Date: November 5
- Location: Bill Snyder Family Football Stadium (Manhattan, KS)
- Game start: 6:00 p.m. CDT
- Game attendance: 51,216
- Game weather: 57 degrees, clear, wind SW at 15 MPH
- Referee: Steve Baron
- TV announcers (FS1): Jason Benetti (play-by-play), Brock Huard (analyst)
- Sources: K-State Box Score Stats

Statistics	Texas	Kansas State
First downs	22	25
Total yards	466	468
Rushes/yards	40/269	35/139
Passing yards	197	329
Passing: Comp–Att–Int	18–31–0	24–36–1
Turnovers	2	2
Time of possession	27:27	32:33
Penalties−yards	7−49	9−85

Team	Category	Player	Statistics
Texas	Passing	Quinn Ewers	18–31, 197 yards, 2 TD
Texas	Rushing	Bijan Robinson	30 carries, 209 yards, 1 TD, 68 Long
Texas	Receiving	Ja'Tavion Sanders	5 receptions, 54 yards, 18 Long
Kansas State	Passing	Adrian Martinez	24–36, 329 yards, 2 TD, 1 INT
Kansas State	Rushing	Deuce Vaughn	19 carries, 73 yards, 11 Long
Kansas State	Receiving	Malik Knowles	3 receptions, 93 yards, 62 Long

Scoring summary

Quarter	Time	Drive			Team	Scoring information	Score	
Quarter	Time	Plays	Yards	TOP	Team	Scoring information	TEX	KSU
1st	12:30	8	75	2:30	TEX	Bijan Robinson 36-yard touchdown run, Bert Auburn kick good	7	0
1st	8:41	7	65	3:42	KSU	Deuce Vaughn 28-yard touchdown reception from Adrian Martinez, Ty Zentner kick good	7	7
1st	5:20	8	75	3:21	TEX	Roschon Johnson 9-yard touchdown run, Bert Auburn kick good	14	7
2nd	13:40	16	84	6:33	KSU	22-yard field goal by Ty Zentner	14	10
2nd	10:24	8	75	3:16	TEX	Xavier Worthy 13-yard touchdown reception from Quinn Ewers, Bert Auburn kick good	21	10
2nd	1:35	7	74	2:02	TEX	28-yard field goal by Bert Auburn	24	10
2nd	0:13	7	27	0:54	TEX	Xavier Worthy 3-yard touchdown reception from Quinn Ewers, Bert Auburn kick good	31	10
3rd	8:37	4	24	1:57	KSU	Adrian Martinez 1-yard touchdown run, Ty Zentner kick good	31	17
4th	14:54	4	71	1:03	KSU	Kade Warner 25-yard touchdown reception from Adrian Martinez, Ty Zentner kick good	31	24
4th	10:29	11	64	4:25	TEX	29-yard field goal by Bert Auburn	34	24
4th	4:26	13	65	6:03	KSU	28-yard field goal by Ty Zentner	34	27
"TOP" = time of possession. For other American football terms, see Glossary of American football.							TEX 34	KSU 27

=== Baylor ===
Team	1	2	3	4	Total
• No. 19 Kansas State	0	17	7	7	31
Baylor	0	3	0	0	3

- Date: November 12
- Location: McLane Stadium, (Waco, TX)
- Game start: 6:00 p.m. CST
- Game attendance: 47,686
- Game weather: 44 degrees, clear, wind N at 7mph
- Referee: Tuta Salaam
- TV announcers (FS1): Adam Alexander (play-by-play), Devin Gardner (analyst)
- Sources: K-State Box Score

Statistics	Kansas State	Baylor
First downs	30	17
Total yards	405	306
Rushes/yards	44/184	23/103
Passing yards	221	203
Passing: Comp–Att–Int	26–35–0	22–38–2
Turnovers	0	2
Time of possession	37:37	22:23
Penalties−yards	4−23	6−51

Team	Category	Player	Statistics
Kansas State	Passing	Will Howard	19/27, 196 YDS, 3 TD
Kansas State	Rushing	Deuce Vaughn	25 CAR, 106 YDS, 18 Long
Kansas State	Receiving	Ben Sinnott	7 REC, 89 YDS, 2 TD, 23 Long
Baylor	Passing	Blake Shapen	22/38, 203 YDS, 2 INT
Baylor	Rushing	Richard Reese	9 CAR, 54 YDS, 14 Long
Baylor	Receiving	Josh Cameron	6 REC, 83 YDS, 25 Long

Scoring summary

Quarter	Time	Drive			Team	Scoring information	Score	
Quarter	Time	Plays	Yards	TOP	Team	Scoring information	KSU	BU
2nd	14:20	12	97	5:04	KSU	Ben Sinnott 15-yard touchdown reception from Will Howard, Ty Zentner kick good	7	0
2nd	5:57	12	47	5:23	KSU	47-yard field goal by Ty Zentner	10	0
2nd	2:09	7	66	2:45	KSU	Deuce Vaughn 20-yard touchdown reception from Will Howard, Ty Zentner kick good	17	0
2nd	0:00	11	56	2:09	BU	37-yard field goal by John Mayers	17	3
3rd	1:53	12	80	4:57	KSU	Ben Sinnott 19-yard touchdown reception from Will Howard, Ty Zentner kick good	24	3
4th	14:06	5	20	1:21	KSU	DJ Giddens 1-yard touchdown run, Ty Zentner kick good	31	3
"TOP" = time of possession. For other American football terms, see Glossary of American football.							KSU 31	BU 3

=== West Virginia ===
Team	1	2	3	4	Total
• No. 15 Kansas State	28	13	0	7	48
West Virginia	19	6	0	6	31

- Date: November 19
- Location: Milan Puskar Stadium, (Morgantown, WV)
- Game start: 1:00 p.m. CST, 2:00 p.m. EST
- Game attendance: 37,055
- Game weather: 34 degrees, sunny, wind W at 10mph
- Referee: Derek Anderson
- TV announcers (ESPN+): Mark Neely (play-by-play), Barrett Brooks (analyst), Tori Petry (reporter)
- Sources: K-State Box Score

Statistics	Kansas State	West Virginia
First downs	21	21
Total yards	437	369
Rushes/yards	42/143	34/153
Passing yards	294	216
Passing: Comp–Att–Int	19-27-1	16-28-2
Turnovers	1	2
Time of possession	31:37	28:23
Penalties−yards	3−30	8−46

Team	Category	Player	Statistics
Kansas State	Passing	Will Howard	19/27, 294 YDS, 2 TD, 1 INT
Kansas State	Rushing	DJ Giddens	12 CAR, 78 YDS, 1 TD, 49 Long
Kansas State	Receiving	Malik Knowles	6 REC, 111 YDS, 1 TD, 43 Long
West Virginia	Passing	Garrett Greene	15/27, 204 YDS, 3 TD, 2 INT
West Virginia	Rushing	Jaylen Anderson	7 CAR, 69 YDS, 23 Long
West Virginia	Receiving	Sam James	3 REC, 102 YDS, 3 TD, 71 Long

Scoring summary

Quarter	Time	Drive			Team	Scoring information	Score	
Quarter	Time	Plays	Yards	TOP	Team	Scoring information	KSU	WVU
1st	12:52	5	69	2:00	KSU	Deuce Vaughn 15-yard touchdown run, Ty Zentner kick good	7	0
1st	11:51				KSU	Interception returned 37 yards for touchdown by Cincere Mason, Ty Zentner kick good	14	0
1st	8:26	8	75	3:25	WVU	Sam James 26-yard touchdown reception from Garrett Greene, Casey Legg kick good	14	7
1st	6:41				WVU	Interception returned 43 yards for touchdown by Malachi Ruffin, Casey Legg kick failed	14	13
1st	5:12	3	68	1:22	KSU	DJ Giddens 49-yard touchdown run, Ty Zentner kick good	21	13
1st	2:17	4	34	1:14	KSU	Will Howard 1-yard touchdown run, Ty Zentner kick good	28	13
1st	1:22	2	81	0:48	WVU	Sam James 71-yard touchdown reception from Garrett Greene, Casey Legg kick failed	28	19
2nd	13:28	6	60	2:47	KSU	Ben Sinnott 15-yard touchdown reception from Will Howard, Ty Zentner kick good	35	19
2nd	6:55	11	87	6:26	WVU	Sam James 5-yard touchdown reception from Garrett Greene, 2-point conversion failed, Garrett Greene run	35	25
2nd	1:46	12	37	5:09	KSU	46-yard field goal by Ty Zentner	38	25
2nd	0:01	6	30	1:19	KSU	53-yard field goal by Ty Zentner	41	25
4th	12:24	3	40	1:04	KSU	Malik Knowles 43-yard touchdown reception from Will Howard, Ty Zentner kick good	48	25
4th	9:30	8	75	2:54	WVU	Garrett Greene 13-yard touchdown run, 2-point conversion failed, Garrett Greene pass	48	31
"TOP" = time of possession. For other American football terms, see Glossary of American football.							KSU 48	WVU 31

=== Kansas ===
Sunflower Showdown

Team	1	2	3	4	Total
Kansas	7	14	0	6	27
• No. 12 Kansas State	23	7	7	10	47

- Date: November 26
- Location: Bill Snyder Family Football Stadium, (Manhattan, KS)
- Game start: 7:00 p.m. CST
- Game attendance: 51,861
- Game weather: 45 degrees, rain, wind N at 4mph
- Referee: Scott Campbell
- TV announcers (FOX): Tim Brando (play-by-play), Spencer Tillman (analyst)
- Sources: K-State Box Score

Statistics	Kansas	Kansas State
First downs	20	20
Total yards	307	443
Rushes/yards	30/127	42/230
Passing yards	180	213
Passing: Comp–Att–Int	21–33–0	11–21–0
Turnovers	2	1
Time of possession	31:00	29:00
Penalties−yards	5−25	6−54

Team	Category	Player	Statistics
Kansas	Passing	Jalon Daniels	20/32, 168 YDS
Kansas	Rushing	Devin Neal	16 CAR, 59 YDS, 2 TD, 11 Long
Kansas	Receiving	Luke Grimm	3 REC, 48 YDS, 33 Long
Kansas State	Passing	Will Howard	11/21, 213 YDS, 2 TD
Kansas State	Rushing	Deuce Vaughn	25 CAR, 147 YDS, 1 TD, 32 Long
Kansas State	Receiving	Deuce Vaughn	2 REC, 82 YDS, 80 Long

Scoring summary

Quarter	Time	Drive			Team	Scoring information	Score	
Quarter	Time	Plays	Yards	TOP	Team	Scoring information	KU	KSU
1st	13:05	1	5	0:05	KSU	Malik Knowles 5-yard touchdown run, Ty Zentner kick good	0	7
1st	7:49	9	75	5:16	KU	Torry Locklin 12-yard touchdown run, Owen Piepergerdes kick good	7	7
1st	5:06	7	75	2:43	KSU	Sammy Wheeler 42-yard touchdown reception from Will Howard, Ty Zentner kick good	7	14
1st	4:11				KSU	Team Safety	7	16
1st	1:37	9	61	2:28	KSU	Malik Knowles 4-yard touchdown run, Ty Zentner kick good	7	23
2nd	11:56	11	75	4:41	KU	Devin Neal 3-yard touchdown run, Owen Piepergerdes kick good	14	23
2nd	9:09	5	92	2:42	KSU	Phillip Brooks 14-yard touchdown reception from Will Howard, Ty Zentner kick good	14	30
2nd	4:57	7	75	4:12	KU	Devin Neal 3-yard touchdown run, Owen Piepergerdes kick good	21	30
3rd	6:59	8	38	4:15	KSU	Deuce Vaughn 1-yard touchdown run, Ty Zentner kick good	21	37
4th	13:39	16	75	8:20	KU	Jalon Daniels 1-yard touchdown run, 2-point conversion failed, Jalon Daniels pass	27	37
4th	11:00	6	22	2:28	KSU	27-yard field goal by Ty Zentner	27	40
4th	4:30	8	85	4:44	KSU	DJ Giddens 5-yard touchdown run, Ty Zentner kick good	27	47
"TOP" = time of possession. For other American football terms, see Glossary of American football.							KU 27	KSU 47

=== No. 3 TCU ===
Big 12 Championship Game

Team	1	2	3	4	OT	Total
• No. 10 Kansas State	7	7	7	7	3	31
No. 3 TCU	7	3	7	11	0	28

- Date: December 3
- Location: AT&T Stadium, (Arlington, TX)
- Game start: 11:00 a.m. CST
- Game attendance: 69,335
- Game weather: 72 degrees, indoors
- Referee: Kevin Mar
- TV announcers (ABC): Chris Fowler (play-by-play), Kirk Herbstreit (analyst), Holly Rowe (reporter)
- Sources: K-State Box Score

Statistics	Kansas State	TCU
First downs	20	18
Total yards	404	469
Rushes/yards	44/205	37/218
Passing yards	199	251
Passing: Comp–Att–Int	18–32–0	18–36–1
Turnovers	1	2
Time of possession	32:00	28:00
Penalties−yards	4−40	4−45

Team	Category	Player	Statistics
Kansas State	Passing	Will Howard	18/32, 199 YDS, 2 TD
Kansas State	Rushing	Deuce Vaughn	26 CAR, 130 YDS, 1 TD, 44 Long
Kansas State	Receiving	Phillip Brooks	6 REC, 48 yards, 15 Long
TCU	Passing	Max Duggan	18/36, 251 YDS, 1 TD, 1 INT
TCU	Rushing	Max Duggan	15 CAR, 110 YDS, 1 TD, 40 Long
TCU	Receiving	Quentin Johnston	4 REC, 139 YDS, 53 Long

Scoring summary

Quarter	Time	Drive			Team	Scoring information	Score	
Quarter	Time	Plays	Yards	TOP	Team	Scoring information	KSU	TCU
1st	5:00	13	92	6:57	TCU	Taye Barber 1-yard touchdown reception from Max Duggan, Griffin Kell kick good	0	7
1st	0:15	6	63	2:15	KSU	Ben Sinnott 6-yard touchdown reception from Will Howard, Ty Zentner kick good	7	7
2nd	10:16	3	59	0:49	KSU	Will Howard 1-yard touchdown run, Ty Zentner kick good	14	7
2nd	0:29	8	56	1:40	TCU	42-yard field goal by Griffin Kell	14	10
3rd	12:19	4	62	1:35	KSU	RJ Garcia II 25-yard touchdown reception from Will Howard, Ty Zentner kick good	21	10
3rd	9:09	3	30	1:11	TCU	Kendre Miller 6-yard touchdown run, Griffin Kell kick good	21	17
4th	11:27	6	80	3:28	KSU	Deuce Vaughn 44-yard touchdown run, Ty Zentner kick good	28	17
4th	7:34	10	51	3:53	TCU	42-yard field goal by Griffin Kell	28	20
4th	1:51	8	80	2:56	TCU	Max Duggan 8-yard touchdown run, 2-point conversion successful, Jared Wiley reception from Max Duggan	28	28
OT	0:00	6	12	0:00	KSU	31-yard field goal by Ty Zentner	31	28
"TOP" = time of possession. For other American football terms, see Glossary of American football.							KSU 31	TCU 28

=== No. 5 Alabama ===
Sugar Bowl

Team	1	2	3	4	Total
• No. 5 Alabama	7	14	21	3	45
No. 9 Kansas State	10	0	3	7	20

- Date: December 31
- Location: Caesars Superdome, (New Orleans, LA)
- Game start: 11:00 a.m. CST
- Game attendance: 60,437
- Game weather: 68 degrees, indoors
- Referee: Larry Smith
- TV announcers (ESPN): Dave Pasch (play-by-play), Dusty Dvoracek (analyst), and Tom Luginbill (field analyst)
- Sources: K-State Box Score

Statistics	Alabama	Kansas State
First downs	17	18
Total yards	496	401
Rushes/yards	33/175	39/191
Passing yards	321	210
Passing: Comp–Att–Int	15–22–0	18–35–2
Turnovers	0	2
Time of possession	24:56	35:04
Penalties−yards	5−45	6−40

Team	Category	Player	Statistics
Alabama	Passing	Bryce Young	15/21, 321 YDS, 5 TD
Alabama	Rushing	Jahmyr Gibbs	15 CAR, 76 YDS, 22 Long
Alabama	Receiving	Jermaine Burton	3 REC, 87 YDS, 1 TD, 47 Long
Kansas State	Passing	Will Howard	18/35, 210 YDS, 2 INT
Kansas State	Rushing	Deuce Vaughn	22 CAR, 133 YDS, 1 TD, 88 Long
Kansas State	Receiving	Ben Sinnott	3 REC, 48 YDS, 24 Long

Scoring summary

Quarter	Time	Drive			Team	Scoring information	Score	
Quarter	Time	Plays	Yards	TOP	Team	Scoring information	ALA	KSU
1st	6:17	11	38	4:45	KSU	41-yard field goal by Ty Zentner	0	3
1st	3:26	1	88	0:14	KSU	Deuce Vaughn 88-yard touchdown run, Ty Zentner kick good	0	10
1st	0:32	6	69	2:46	ALA	Isaiah Bond 6-yard touchdown reception from Bryce Young, Will Reichard kick good	7	10
2nd	11:33	6	63	3:09	ALA	Cameron Latu 1-yard touchdown reception from Bryce Young, Will Reichard kick good	14	10
2nd	0:10	7	98	0:51	ALA	Jermaine Burton 12-yard touchdown reception from Bryce Young, Will Reichard kick good	21	10
3rd	13:54	3	46	1:05	ALA	Ja'Corey Brooks 32-yard touchdown reception from Bryce Young, Will Reichard kick good	28	10
3rd	13:00	1	17	0:08	ALA	Jase McClellan 17-yard touchdown run, Will Reichard kick good	35	10
3rd	6:33	8	54	2:17	KSU	28-yard field goal by Ty Zentner	35	13
3rd	0:00	3	51	1:33	ALA	Kobe Prentice 47-yard touchdown reception from Bryce Young, Will Reichard kick good	42	13
4th	11:00	6	14	2:31	ALA	49-yard field goal by Will Reichard	45	13
4th	3:06	10	71	4:27	KSU	Jordan Schippers 1-yard touchdown run, Ty Zentner kick good	45	20
"TOP" = time of possession. For other American football terms, see Glossary of American football.							ALA 45	KSU 20

== Rankings ==
Ranking movements Legend: ██ Increase in ranking ██ Decrease in ranking — = Not ranked RV = Received votes
	Week															
Poll	Pre	1	2	3	4	5	6	7	8	9	10	11	12	13	14	Final
AP	RV	RV	—	—	25	20	17	17	22	13	23	19	15	13	11	14
Coaches	RV	RV	RV	—	RV	20	16	17	22	14	22	17	13	10	9	14
CFP	Not released									13	19	15	12	10	9	Not released

== Players drafted into the NFL ==
Round	Pick	Player	Position	NFL Club
1	31	Felix Anudike-Uzomah	DE	Kansas City Chiefs
2	44	JuJu Brents	DB	Indianapolis Colts
6	181	Josh Hayes	DB	Tampa Bay Buccaneers
6	212	Deuce Vaughn	RB	Dallas Cowboys
