= 2022 West Virginia Mountaineers football team =

American college football season

2022 West Virginia Mountaineers football
- Conference: Big 12 Conference
- Record: 5–7 (3–6 Big 12)
- Head coach: Neal Brown (4th season)
- Offensive coordinator: Graham Harrell (1st season)
- Offensive scheme: Air raid
- Defensive coordinator: Jordan Lesley (3rd season)
- Co-defensive coordinator: ShaDon Brown (2nd season)
- Base defense: Multiple
- Home stadium: Milan Puskar Stadium

2022 Big 12 Conference football standings
| | Conf. | | | Overall |
| Team | W | | L | W | | L |
|---|---|---|---|---|---|---|
| No. 2 TCU y^ | 9 | – | 0 | 13 | – | 2 |
| No. 14 Kansas State y$ | 7 | – | 2 | 10 | – | 4 |
| No. 25 Texas | 6 | – | 3 | 8 | – | 5 |
| Texas Tech | 5 | – | 4 | 8 | – | 5 |
| Oklahoma State | 4 | – | 5 | 7 | – | 6 |
| Baylor | 4 | – | 5 | 6 | – | 7 |
| Oklahoma | 3 | – | 6 | 6 | – | 7 |
| Kansas | 3 | – | 6 | 6 | – | 7 |
| West Virginia | 3 | – | 6 | 5 | – | 7 |
| Iowa State | 1 | – | 8 | 4 | – | 8 |
Championship: Kansas State 31, TCU 28 ^{OT}
^ – College Football Playoff participant; $ – Conference champion; y – Championship game participant; Rankings from AP Poll

The 2022 West Virginia Mountaineers football team represented West Virginia University in the 2022 NCAA Division I FBS football season. The Mountaineers played their home games at Milan Puskar Stadium in Morgantown, West Virginia, and competed in the Big 12 Conference. They were led by fourth-year head coach Neal Brown.

== Preseason ==
=== Big 12 media poll ===
The preseason poll was released on July 7, 2022.

- First place votes in ()

Big 12 media poll
| Predicted finish | Team | Votes (1st place) |
| 1 | Baylor (17) | 365 |
| 2 | Oklahoma (12) | 354 |
| 3 | Oklahoma State (9) | 342 |
| 4 | Texas (2) | 289 |
| 5 | Kansas State | 261 |
| 6 | Iowa State (1) | 180 |
| 7 | TCU | 149 |
| 8 | West Virginia | 147 |
| 9 | Texas Tech | 119 |
| 10 | Kansas | 48 |

=== Preseason Big-12 awards ===
2022 Preseason All-Big 12 teams

| Position | Player | Class |
|---|---|---|
Offense
| OL | Zach Frazier | Sophomore |
Defense
| DL | Dante Stills | Senior |
| DB | Charles Woods | Senior |
Special teams
| K | Casey Legg | RS Senior |

== Offseason ==
=== Transfer portal ===
==== Outgoing transfers ====
| Name | Pos. | New school |
|---|---|---|
| Lyn-J Dixon | RB | Tennessee |
| Ja'Corey Hammett | LB | None |
| John Hughes | OT | Rice |
| Nicktroy Fortune | CB | UTSA |
| Akheem Mesidor | DL | Miami |
| Josh Chandler | LB | Colorado |
| Tavis Lee | LB | None |
| Daryl Porter | CB | Miami |
| Charles Finley | TE | None |
| Isaiah Esdale | WR | Rice |
| Sean Ryan | WR | Rutgers |
| Jackie Matthews | CB | Mississippi State |
| Winston Wright | WR | Florida State |
| Jarret Doege | QB | Western Kentucky |
| TJ Banks | TE | Akron |
| VanDarius Cowan | LB | Maryland |
| Parker Moorer | OT | East Carolina |
| Sam Brown | WR | Houston |
| Avarius Sparrow | RB | Middle Tennessee |
| Devell Washington | LB | Northern Iowa |
| Darel Middleton | DL | Texas Tech |
| Kerry Martin | S | Akron |
| Eddie Watkins | LB | Alabama A&M |
| James Thomas | LB | None |
| Kaulin Parris | K | None |

==== Incoming transfers ====
| Name | Pos. | Previous school |
|---|---|---|
| Wesley McCormick | CB | JMU |
| Rashad Ajayi | CB | Colorado State |
| Tirek Austin-Cave | LB | Miami |
| Jasir Cox | OLB | NDSU |
| Michael Lockhart | DL | Georgia Tech |
| JT Daniels | QB | Georgia |
| Marcis Floyd | CB | Murray State |
| Parker Grothaus | K | Florida State |
| Brian Polendey | TE | Colorado State |
| Zeiqui Lawton | SDE | Cincinnati |
| Sy'Veon Wilkerson | RB | Delaware State |

== Schedule ==
| Date | Time | Opponent | Site | TV | Result | Attendance |
|---|---|---|---|---|---|---|
| September 1 | 7:00 p.m. | at No. 17 Pittsburgh* | Acrisure Stadium; Pittsburgh, PA (Backyard Brawl, College GameDay) | ESPN | L 31–38 | 70,622 |
| September 10 | 6:00 p.m. | Kansas | Milan Puskar Stadium; Morgantown, WV | ESPN+ | L 42–55 ^{OT} | 52,188 |
| September 17 | 1:00 p.m. | Towson* | Milan Puskar Stadium; Morgantown, WV | ESPN+ | W 65–7 | 50,703 |
| September 22 | 7:30 p.m. | at Virginia Tech* | Lane Stadium; Blacksburg, VA (rivalry) | ESPN | W 33–10 | 65,632 |
| October 1 | 7:30 p.m. | at Texas | Darrell K Royal–Texas Memorial Stadium; Austin, TX | FS1 | L 20–38 | 100,740 |
| October 13 | 7:00 p.m. | Baylor | Milan Puskar Stadium; Morgantown, WV (Stripe the Stadium) | FS1 | W 43–40 | 45,293 |
| October 22 | 3:00 p.m. | at Texas Tech | Jones AT&T Stadium; Lubbock, TX | FS1 | L 10–48 | 56,530 |
| October 29 | 12:00 p.m. | No. 7 TCU^{†} | Milan Puskar Stadium; Morgantown, WV | ESPN | L 31–41 | 50,426 |
| November 5 | 3:30 p.m. | at Iowa State | Jack Trice Stadium; Ames, IA | ESPN+ | L 14–31 | 56,109 |
| November 12 | 12:00 p.m. | Oklahoma | Milan Puskar Stadium; Morgantown, WV (True Blue) | FS1 | W 23–20 | 50,281 |
| November 19 | 2:00 p.m. | No. 15 Kansas State | Milan Puskar Stadium; Morgantown, WV | ESPN+ | L 31–48 | 37,055 |
| November 26 | 12:00 p.m. | at Oklahoma State | Boone Pickens Stadium; Stillwater, OK | ESPN2 | W 24–19 | 52,353 |
*Non-conference game; ^{†}Homecoming; Rankings from AP Poll (and CFP Rankings, after November 1) - Released prior to game; All times are in Eastern time

== Game summaries ==
=== At No. 17 Pittsburgh (College GameDay) ===
West Virginia Mountaineers at No. 17 Pittsburgh Panthers – Game summary

| Quarter | 1 | 2 | 3 | 4 | Total |
|---|---|---|---|---|---|
| Mountaineers | 0 | 10 | 7 | 14 | 31 |
| No. 17 Panthers | 3 | 7 | 14 | 14 | 38 |

at Acrisure Stadium, Pittsburgh, Pennsylvania

- Date: September 1
- Game time: 7:00 p.m. EDT
- Game weather: Sunny, 82 °F (28 °C)
- Game attendance: 70,622
- Referee: David Alvarez
- TV announcers (ESPN): Matt Barrie, Louis Riddick and Harry Lyles Jr.
- Box score, Recap

Game information
First quarter
- PITT – Ben Sauls 42 yard field goal, 0:37. Panthers 3–0. Drive: 11 plays, 73 yards, 6:48.

Second quarter

- WVU – Bryce Ford-Wheaton 10 yard pass from JT Daniels (Casey Legg kick), 12:45. Mountaineers 7–3. Drive: 6 plays, 75 yards, 2:52.
- PITT – Rodney Hammond Jr. 4 yard run (Ben Sauls kick), 3:23. Panthers 10–7. Drive: 6 plays, 35 yards, 2:52.
- WVU – Casey Legg 24 yard field goal, 0:00. Tied 10–10. Drive: 13 plays, 74 yards, 3:17.

Third quarter

- WVU – C. J. Donaldson 5 yard run (Casey Legg kick), 13:08. Mountaineers 17–10. Drive: 1 play, 5 yards, 0:08.
- PITT – Daniel Carter 1 yard run (Ben Sauls kick), 5:54. Tied 17–17. Drive: 4 plays, 65 yards, 1:32.
- PITT – Rodney Hammond Jr. 11 yard run (Ben Sauls kick), 3:42. Panthers 24–17. Drive: 3 plays, 62 yards, 1:26.

Fourth quarter

- WVU – Bryce Ford-Wheaton 16 yard pass from JT Daniels (Casey Legg kick), 14:52. Tied 24–24. Drive: 9 plays, 75 yards, 3:50.
- WVU – JT Daniels 1 yard run (Casey Legg kick), 10:37. Mountaineers 31–24. Drive: 6 play, 72 yards, 1:14.
- PITT – Israel Abanikanda 24 yard pass from Kedon Slovis (Ben Sauls kick), 3:41. Tied 31–31. Drive: 7 plays, 92 yards, 2:29.
- PITT – M. J. Devonshire 56 interception return (Ben Sauls kick), 2:58. Panthers 38–31.

Statistics

| Statistics | WVU | PITT |
|---|---|---|
| First downs | 22 | 20 |
| Total yards | 404 | 384 |
| Rushing yards | 190 | 76 |
| Passing yards | 214 | 308 |
| Turnovers | 2 | 1 |
| Time of possession | 27:29 | 32:31 |

| Team | Category | Player | Statistics |
|---|---|---|---|
| West Virginia | Passing | JT Daniels | 23/40, 214 yards, 2 TD, INT |
| West Virginia | Rushing | CJ Donaldson | 7 rushes, 125 yards, TD |
| West Virginia | Receiving | Bryce Ford-Wheaton | 9 receptions, 97 yards, 2 TD |
| Pittsburgh | Passing | Kedon Slovis | 16/24, 308 yards, TD |
| Pittsburgh | Rushing | Rodney Hammond Jr. | 16 rushes, 74 yards, TD |
| Pittsburgh | Receiving | Jared Wayne | 3 receptions, 89 yards |

=== Kansas ===
Kansas Jayhawks at West Virginia Mountaineers – Game summary

| Quarter | 1 | 2 | 3 | 4 | OT | Total |
|---|---|---|---|---|---|---|
| Jayhawks | 0 | 21 | 14 | 7 | 13 | 55 |
| Mountaineers | 14 | 14 | 0 | 14 | 0 | 42 |

at Milan Puskar Stadium, Morgantown, West Virginia

- Date: September 10
- Game time: 6:00 p.m. EDT
- Game weather: Cloudy, 69 °F (21 °C)
- Game attendance: 52,188
- Referee: Kevin Mar
- TV announcers (ESPN+): Courtney Lyle and Forest Conoly
- Box score, Recap

Game information
First quarter
- WVU – Sam James 59-yard pass from JT Daniels (Casey Legg kick), 13:19. Mountaineers 7–0. Drive: 4 plays, 75 yards, 1:41.
- WVU – C. J. Donaldson 1-yard run (Casey Legg kick), 5:03. Mountaineers 14–0. Drive: 12 plays, 60 yards, 5:45.

Second quarter

- KU – Mason Fairchild 10-yard pass from Jalon Daniels (Jacob Borcila kick), 14:57. Mountaineers 14–7. Drive: 10 plays, 79 yards, 5:01.
- WVU – Bryce Ford-Wheaton 67-yard pass from JT Daniels (Casey Legg kick), 13:15. Mountaineers 21–7. Drive: 4 plays, 75 yards, 1:42.
- KU – Devin Neal 6-yard run (Jacob Borcila kick), 8:26. Mountaineers 21–14. Drive: 11 plays, 75 yards, 4:49.
- WVU – Bryce Ford-Wheaton 5-yard pass from JT Daniels (Casey Legg kick), 3:11. Mountaineers 28–14. Drive: 12 plays, 75 yards, 5:15.
- KU – Devin Neal 17-yard pass from Jalon Daniels (Jacob Borcila kick), 0:29. Mountaineers 28–21. Drive: 10 plays, 75 yards, 2:42.

Third quarter

- KU – Daniel Hishaw Jr. 3-yard run (Jacob Borcila kick), 11:32. Tied 28–28. Drive: 8 plays, 75 yards, 3:28.
- KU – Devin Neal 2-yard run (Jacob Borcila kick), 4:00. Jayhawks 35–28. Drive: 6 plays, 24 yards, 3:00.

Fourth quarter

- WVU – Casey Legg 27-yard field goal, 12:58. Jayhawks 35–31. Drive: 13 plays, 65 yards, 6:02.
- KU – Daniel Hishaw Jr. 30-yard run (Jacob Borcila kick), 10:59. Jayhawks 42–31. Drive: 4 plays, 65 yards, 1:56.
- WVU – Casey Legg 28-yard field goal, 4:04. Jayhawks 42–34. Drive: 14 plays, 64 yards, 6:55.
- WVU – C. J. Donaldson 1-yard run (JT Daniels pass to Bryce Ford-Wheaton), 0:35. Tied 42–42. Drive: 13 plays, 85 yards, 1:42.

Overtime

- KU – Quentin Skinner 4-yard pass from Jalon Daniels (Jacob Borcila kick). Jayhawks 49–42. Drive: 5 plays, 25 yards.
- KU – Cobee Bryant 86-yard interception return. Jayhawks 55–42.

Statistics

| Statistics | KU | WVU |
|---|---|---|
| First downs | 24 | 27 |
| Total yards | 419 | 511 |
| Rushing yards | 200 | 146 |
| Passing yards | 219 | 365 |
| Turnovers | 0 | 2 |
| Time of possession | 27:33 | 32:27 |

| Team | Category | Player | Statistics |
|---|---|---|---|
| Kansas | Passing | Jalon Daniels | 18/29, 219 yards, 3 TD |
| Kansas | Rushing | Jalon Daniels | 12 rushes, 85 yards |
| Kansas | Receiving | Luke Grimm | 6 receptions, 66 yards |
| West Virginia | Passing | JT Daniels | 27/39, 365 yards, 3 TD, INT |
| West Virginia | Rushing | Tony Mathis Jr. | 16 rushes, 59 yards |
| West Virginia | Receiving | Bryce Ford-Wheaton | 11 receptions, 152 yards, 2 TD |

=== Towson ===
Towson Tigers at West Virginia Mountaineers – Game summary

| Quarter | 1 | 2 | 3 | 4 | Total |
|---|---|---|---|---|---|
| Tigers | 7 | 0 | 0 | 0 | 7 |
| Mountaineers | 21 | 24 | 6 | 14 | 65 |

at Milan Puskar Stadium, Morgantown, West Virginia

- Date: September 17
- Game time: 1:00 p.m. EDT
- Game weather: Sunny, 77 °F (25 °C)
- Game attendance: 50,703
- Referee: Dan Scanlan
- TV announcers (ESPN+): Noah Reed and Adam Breneman
- Box score, Recap

Game information
First quarter
- WVU – Kaden Prather 2-yard pass from JT Daniels (Casey Legg kick), 11:27. Mountaineers 7–0. Drive: 10 plays, 75 yards, 3:33.
- TOW – D'Ago Hunter 96-yard kickoff return (Keegan Vaughn kick), 11:14. Tied 7–7.
- WVU – Tony Mathis Jr. 3-yard run (Casey Legg kick), 5:40. Mountaineers 14–7. Drive: 12 plays, 75 yards, 5:34.
- WVU – C. J. Donaldson 82-yard run (Casey Legg kick), 3:40. Mountaineers 21–7. Drive: 1 play, 82 yards, 0:13.

Second quarter

- WVU – C. J. Donaldson 3-yard run (Casey Legg kick), 12:59. Mountaineers 28–7. Drive: 12 plays, 46 yards, 4:02.
- WVU – Tony Mathis Jr. 2-yard run (Casey Legg kick), 5:59. Mountaineers 35–7. Drive: 8 plays, 57 yards, 4:40.
- WVU – Casey Legg 26-yard field goal, 2:42. Mountaineers 38–7. Drive: 5 plays, 51 yards, 1:36.
- WVU – C. J. Donaldson 1-yard run (Casey Legg kick), 0:06. Mountaineers 45–7. Drive: 7 plays, 49 yards, 1:05.

Third quarter

- WVU – Garrett Greene 11-yard run (kick failed), 8:21. Mountaineers 51–7. Drive: 11 plays, 84 yards, 5:14.

Fourth quarter

- WVU – Jeremiah Aaron 5-yard pass from Will Crowder (Parker Grothaus kick), 11:12. Mountaineers 58–7. Drive: 13 plays, 68 yards, 7:23.
- WVU – Preston Fox 26-yard pass from Nicco Marchiol (Parker Grothaus kick), 4:42. Mountaineers 65–7. Drive: 7 plays, 58 yards, 2:40.

Statistics

| Statistics | TOW | WVU |
|---|---|---|
| First downs | 11 | 32 |
| Total yards | 180 | 624 |
| Rushing yards | 82 | 316 |
| Passing yards | 98 | 308 |
| Turnovers | 1 | 0 |
| Time of possession | 24:00 | 36:00 |

| Team | Category | Player | Statistics |
|---|---|---|---|
| Towson | Passing | Tyrrell Pigrome | 7/14, 59 yards |
| Towson | Rushing | Devin Matthews | 7 rushes, 38 yards |
| Towson | Receiving | Da'Kendall James | 5 receptions, 44 yards |
| West Virginia | Passing | JT Daniels | 16/24, 174 yards, TD |
| West Virginia | Rushing | Tony Mathis Jr. | 17 rushes, 104 yards, 2 TD |
| West Virginia | Receiving | Cortez Braham | 5 receptions, 60 yards |

=== At Virginia Tech ===
West Virginia Mountaineers at Virginia Tech Hokies – Game summary

| Quarter | 1 | 2 | 3 | 4 | Total |
|---|---|---|---|---|---|
| Mountaineers | 3 | 10 | 3 | 17 | 33 |
| Hokies | 0 | 7 | 3 | 0 | 10 |

at Lane Stadium, Blacksburg, Virginia

- Date: September 22
- Game time: 7:30 p.m. EDT
- Game weather: Sunny, 61 °F (16 °C)
- Game attendance: 65,632
- Referee: Scott Campbell
- TV announcers (ESPN): Matt Barrie, Louis Riddick and Harry Lyles Jr.
- Box score, Recap

Game information
First quarter
- WVU – Casey Legg 23-yard field goal, 3:19. Mountaineers 3–0. Drive: 14 plays, 92 yards, 7:06.

Second quarter

- VT – Kaleb Smith 28-yard pass from Grant Wells (William Ross kick), 14:52. Hokies 7–3. Drive: 8 plays, 77 yards, 3:27.
- WVU – Casey Legg 35-yard field goal, 1:50. Hokies 7–6. Drive: 9 plays, 40 yards, 3:14.
- WVU – Sam James 24-yard pass from JT Daniels (Casey Legg kick), 0:11. Mountaineers 13–7. Drive: 6 plays, 70 yards, 0:50.

Third quarter

- WVU – Casey Legg 25-yard field goal, 7:04. Mountaineers 16–7. Drive: 14 plays, 79 yards, 6:31.
- VT – William Ross 44-yard field goal, 4:19. Mountaineers 16–10. Drive: 9 plays, 50 yards, 2:45.

Fourth quarter

- WVU – Justin Johnson Jr. 6-yard run (Casey Legg kick), 14:13. Mountaineers 23–10. Drive: 9 plays, 75 yards, 5:06.
- WVU – Casey Legg 38-yard field goal, 10:16. Mountaineers 26–10. Drive: 5 plays, 35 yards, 2:54.
- WVU – Jacolby Spells 27-yard interception return (Casey Legg kick), 9:36. Mountaineers 33–10.

Statistics

| Statistics | WVU | VT |
|---|---|---|
| First downs | 32 | 14 |
| Total yards | 421 | 228 |
| Rushing yards | 218 | 35 |
| Passing yards | 203 | 193 |
| Turnovers | 1 | 1 |
| Time of possession | 38:44 | 21:16 |

| Team | Category | Player | Statistics |
|---|---|---|---|
| West Virginia | Passing | JT Daniels | 20/30, 203 yards, TD |
| West Virginia | Rushing | C. J. Donaldson | 23 rushes, 106 yards |
| West Virginia | Receiving | Kaden Prather | 6 receptions, 69 yards |
| Virginia Tech | Passing | Grant Wells | 16/35, 193 yards, TD, INT |
| Virginia Tech | Rushing | Jalen Holsten | 4 rushes, 18 yards |
| Virginia Tech | Receiving | Kaleb Smith | 5 receptions, 70 yards, TD |

=== At Texas ===
West Virginia Mountaineers at Texas Longhorns – Game summary

| Quarter | 1 | 2 | 3 | 4 | Total |
|---|---|---|---|---|---|
| Mountaineers | 0 | 7 | 0 | 13 | 20 |
| Longhorns | 14 | 14 | 7 | 3 | 38 |

at Darrell K Royal–Texas Memorial Stadium, Austin, Texas

- Date: October 1
- Game time: 7:30 p.m. EDT / 6:30 p.m. CDT
- Game weather: Sunny
- Game attendance: 100,740
- Referee: Michael Vandervelde
- TV announcers (FS1): Tim Brando and Spencer Tillman
- Box score, Recap

Game information
First quarter
- TEX – Xavier Worthy 15-yard pass from Hudson Card (Bert Auburn kick), 6:08. Longhorns 7–0. Drive: 7 plays, 60 yards, 3:08.
- TEX – Ja'Tavion Sanders 33-yard pass from Xavier Worthy (Bert Auburn kick), 0:34. Longhorns 14–0. Drive: 6 plays, 74 yards, 2:22.

Second quarter

- TEX – Bijan Robinson 1-yard run (Bert Auburn kick), 11:54. Longhorns 21–0. Drive: 6 plays, 71 yards, 2:14.
- TEX – Ja'Tavion Sanders 13-yard pass from Hudson Card (Bert Auburn kick), 4:22. Longhorns 28–0. Drive: 6 plays, 87 yards, 3:13.
- WVU – Kaden Prather 8-yard pass from JT Daniels (Casey Legg kick), 0:13. Longhorns 28–7. Drive: 13 plays, 83 yards, 4:04.

Third quarter

- TEX – Xavier Worthy 44-yard pass from Hudson Card (Bert Auburn kick), 13:03. Longhorns 35–7. Drive: 5 plays, 70 yards, 1:51.

Fourth quarter

- WVU – Tony Mathis Jr. 1-yard run (Casey Legg kick), 14:56. Longhorns 35–14. Drive: 18 plays, 65 yards, 7:31.
- TEX – Bert Auburn 45-yard field goal, 10:22. Longhorns 38–14. Drive: 10 plays, 48 yards, 4:34.
- WVU – Justin Johnson Jr. 4-yard run (pass failed), 4:31. Longhorns 38–20. Drive: 14 plays, 75 yards, 5:51.

Statistics

| Statistics | WVU | TEX |
|---|---|---|
| First downs | 22 | 25 |
| Total yards | 314 | 446 |
| Rushing yards | 61 | 110 |
| Passing yards | 253 | 336 |
| Turnovers | 0 | 0 |
| Time of possession | 32:10 | 27:50 |

| Team | Category | Player | Statistics |
|---|---|---|---|
| West Virginia | Passing | JT Daniels | 29/48, 253 yards, TD |
| West Virginia | Rushing | Justin Johnson Jr. | 10 rushes, 42 yards, TD |
| West Virginia | Receiving | Bryce Ford-Wheaton | 8 receptions, 93 yards |
| Texas | Passing | Hudson Card | 21/27, 303 yards, 3 TD |
| Texas | Rushing | Bijan Robinson | 21 rushes, 101 yards, TD |
| Texas | Receiving | Xavier Worthy | 7 receptions, 119 yards, 2 TD |

=== Baylor ===
Baylor Bears at West Virginia Mountaineers – Game summary

| Quarter | 1 | 2 | 3 | 4 | Total |
|---|---|---|---|---|---|
| Bears | 3 | 21 | 7 | 9 | 40 |
| Mountaineers | 7 | 10 | 14 | 12 | 43 |

at Milan Puskar Stadium, Morgantown, West Virginia

- Date: October 13
- Game time: 7:00 p.m. EDT
- Game weather: Clear, 54 °F (12 °C)
- Game attendance: 45,293
- Referee: Kevin Mar
- TV announcers (FS1): Noah Eagle and Mark Helfrich
- Box score, Recap

Game information
First quarter
- WVU – Tony Mathis Jr. 7-yard run (Casey Legg kick), 10:30. Mountaineers 7–0. Drive: 8 plays, 65 yards, 3:18.
- BAY – John Mayers 40-yard field goal, 4:23. Mountaineers 7–3. Drive: 14 plays, 71 yards, 6:00.

Second quarter

- BAY – Ben Sims 1-yard run (John Mayers kick), 13:34. Bears 10–7. Drive: 5 plays, 85 yards, 2:32.
- BAY – Gavin Holmes 35-yard pass from Blake Shapen (John Mayers kick), 10:52. Bears 17–7. Drive: 3 plays, 70 yards, 1:23.
- WVU – Casey Legg 23-yard field goal, 4:22. Bears 17–10. Drive: 13 plays, 69 yards, 6:30.
- WVU – Jasir Cox 65-yard fumble return (Casey Legg kick), 2:41. Tied 17–17.
- BAY – Craig Williams 39-yard pass from Blake Shapen (John Mayers kick), 1:14. Bears 24–17. Drive: 5 plays, 75 yards, 1:27.

Third quarter

- WVU – Kaden Prather 24-yard pass from JT Daniels (Casey Legg kick), 10:19. Tied 24–24. Drive: 10 plays, 75 yards, 4:41.
- BAY – Hal Presley 2-yard pass from Kyron Drones (John Mayers kick), 5:21. Bears 31–24. Drive: 13 plays, 74 yards, 4:51.
- WVU – Justin Johnson Jr. 1-yard run (Casey Legg kick), 1:42. Tied 31–31. Drive: 8 plays, 75 yards, 3:39.

Fourth quarter

- BAY – Qualan Jones 4-yard run (kick blocked), 13:39. Bears 37–31. Drive: 6 plays, 74 yards, 2:57.
- WVU – Jacolby Spells defensive PAT conversion, 13:39. Bears 37–33.
- WVU – Tony Mathis Jr. 34-yard run (Casey Legg kick), 7:06. Mountaineers 40–37. Drive: 6 plays, 72 yards, 1:55.
- BAY – John Mayers 44-yard field goal, 1:40. Tied 40–40. Drive: 4 plays, 0 yards, 1:32.
- WVU – Casey Legg 22-yard field goal, 0:33. Mountaineers 43–40. Drive: 8 plays, 61 yards, 1:00.

Statistics

| Statistics | BAY | WVU |
|---|---|---|
| First downs | 28 | 26 |
| Total yards | 590 | 500 |
| Rushing yards | 169 | 217 |
| Passing yards | 421 | 283 |
| Turnovers | 4 | 1 |
| Time of possession | 29:35 | 30:25 |

| Team | Category | Player | Statistics |
|---|---|---|---|
| Baylor | Passing | Blake Shapen | 14/22, 326 yards, 2 TD |
| Baylor | Rushing | Richard Reese | 13 rushes, 57 yards |
| Baylor | Receiving | Gavin Holmes | 7 receptions, 210 yards, TD |
| West Virginia | Passing | JT Daniels | 24/37, 283 yards, TD, INT |
| West Virginia | Rushing | Tony Mathis Jr. | 22 rushes, 163 yards, 2 TD |
| West Virginia | Receiving | Kaden Prather | 8 receptions, 109 yards, TD |

=== At Texas Tech ===
West Virginia Mountaineers at Texas Tech Red Raiders – Game summary

| Quarter | 1 | 2 | 3 | 4 | Total |
|---|---|---|---|---|---|
| Mountaineers | 3 | 0 | 7 | 0 | 10 |
| Red Raiders | 14 | 3 | 14 | 17 | 48 |

at Jones AT&T Stadium, Lubbock, Texas

- Date: October 22
- Game time: 3:00 p.m. EDT / 2:00 p.m. CDT
- Game weather: Cloudy, 83 °F (28 °C)
- Game attendance: 53,560
- Referee: Steve Baron
- TV announcers (FS1): Noah Eagle and Mark Helfrich
- Box score, Recap

Game information
First quarter
- TTU – Tahj Brooks 19-yard run (Trey Wolff kick), 13:23. Red Raiders 7–0. Drive: 8 plays, 75 yards, 1:37.
- TTU – Tahj Brooks 1-yard run (Trey Wolff kick), 8:35. Red Raiders 14–0. Drive: 16 plays, 80 yards, 3:44.
- WVU – Casey Legg 38-yard field goal, 0:45. Red Raiders 14–3. Drive: 15 plays, 61 yards, 7:50.

Second quarter

- TTU – Trey Wolff 46-yard field goal, 12:25. Red Raiders 17–3. Drive: 12 plays, 47 yards, 3:20.

Third quarter

- TTU – Xavier White 55-yard pass from Behren Morton (Trey Wolff kick), 13:34. Red Raiders 24–3. Drive: 2 plays, 58 yards, 0:41.
- TTU – Loic Fouonji 12-yard pass from Behren Morton (Trey Wolff kick), 6:56. Red Raiders 31–3. Drive: 12 plays, 91 yards, 3:07.
- WVU – Bryce Ford-Wheaton 28-yard pass from JT Daniels (Casey Legg kick), 5:05. Red Raiders 31–10. Drive: 6 plays, 75 yards, 1:51.

Fourth quarter

- TTU – SaRodrick Thompson 13-yard run (Trey Wolff kick), 14:46. Red Raiders 38–10. Drive: 8 plays, 50 yards, 2:14.
- TTU – Trey Wolff 26-yard field goal, 11:58. Red Raiders 41–10. Drive: 8 plays, 48 yards, 2:42.
- TTU – Brady Boyd 2-yard pass from Donovan Smith (Gino Garcio kick), 2:33. Red Raiders 48–10. Drive: 14 plays, 84 yards, 7:48.

Statistics

| Statistics | WVU | TTU |
|---|---|---|
| First downs | 19 | 33 |
| Total yards | 282 | 594 |
| Rushing yards | 73 | 239 |
| Passing yards | 209 | 355 |
| Turnovers | 4 | 0 |
| Time of possession | 26:09 | 33:51 |

| Team | Category | Player | Statistics |
|---|---|---|---|
| West Virginia | Passing | JT Daniels | 23/36, 194 yards, TD, 3 INT |
| West Virginia | Rushing | Tony Mathis Jr. | 7 rushes, 33 yards |
| West Virginia | Receiving | Bryce Ford-Wheaton | 5 receptions, 53 yards, TD |
| Texas Tech | Passing | Behren Morton | 28/45, 325 yards, 2 TD |
| Texas Tech | Rushing | Tahj Brooks | 17 rushes, 107 yards, 2 TD |
| Texas Tech | Receiving | Xavier White | 8 receptions, 139 yards, TD |

=== No. 7 TCU ===
No. 7 TCU Horned Frogs at West Virginia Mountaineers – Game summary

| Quarter | 1 | 2 | 3 | 4 | Total |
|---|---|---|---|---|---|
| No. 7 Horned Frogs | 7 | 21 | 0 | 13 | 41 |
| Mountaineers | 7 | 14 | 3 | 7 | 31 |

at Milan Puskar Stadium, Morgantown, WV

- Date: October 29
- Game time: 12:00 p.m. EDT
- Game weather: Clear • Temperature: 57 °F (14 °C) • Wind: NE 4 miles per hour (6.4 km/h)
- Game attendance: 50,426
- Referee: Kevin Mar
- TV announcers (ESPN): Bob Wischusen and Roddy Jones
- Box score, Recap

Game information
First quarter
- WVU – CJ Donaldson 1-yard Run (Casey Legg Kick), 8:02. Mountaineers 7–0. Drive: 8 plays, 80 yards, 4:38.
- TCU – Taye Barber 71 Yd pass from Max Duggan (Griffin Kell Kick), 4:27. Tied 7-7. Drive: 3 plays, 67 yards, 1:35.

Second quarter

- WVU – CJ Donaldson 1 Yd Run (Casey Legg Kick), 14:47. Mountaineers 14-7. Drive: 10 plays, 75 yards, 4:40.
- TCU - Quentin Johnston 55 Yd pass from Max Duggan (Griffin Kell Kick), 11:42. Tied 14-14. Drive: 5 plays, 75 yards, 3:05.
- TCU - Kendre Miller 51 Yd Run (Griffin Kell Kick), 7:00. Horned Frogs 21-14. Drive: 1 play, 51 yards, 0:08.
- WVU - Justin Johnson Jr. 5 Yd pass from JT Daniels (Casey Legg Kick), 1:35. Tied 21-21. Drive: 15 plays, 89 yards, 5:25.
- TCU - Emani Bailey 30 Yd Run (Griffin Kell Kick), 0:24. Horned Frogs 28-21. Drive: 7 plays, 73 yards, 1:11.

Third quarter

- WVU – Casey Legg 33 Yd Field Goal, 11:05. Horned Frogs 28-24. Drive: 4 plays, 2 yards, 2:04.

Fourth quarter

- TCU – Griffin Kell 30 Yd Field Goal, 13:03. Horned Frogs 31-24. Drive: 14 plays, 84 yards, 7:07.
- TCU – Griffin Kell 46 Yd Field Goal, 9:11. Horned Frogs 34-24. Drive: 5 plays, 26 yards, 2:36.
- WVU – Reese Smith 23 Yd pass from JT Daniels (Casey Legg Kick), 4:12. Horned Frogs 34-31. Drive: 12 plays, 78 yards, 4:59.
- TCU – Savion Williams 29 Yd pass from Max Duggan (Griffin Kell Kick), 0:20. Horned Frogs 41-31. Drive: 7 plays, 50 yards, 2:33.

Statistics

| Statistics | TCU | WVU |
|---|---|---|
| First downs | 17 | 25 |
| Total yards | 494 | 430 |
| Rushing yards | 153 | 155 |
| Passing yards | 341 | 275 |
| Turnovers | 2 | 2 |
| Time of possession | 23:44 | 36:16 |

| Team | Category | Player | Statistics |
|---|---|---|---|
| TCU | Passing | Max Duggan | 16/28, 341 yards, 3 TD, INT |
| TCU | Rushing | Kendre Miller | 12 rushes, 120 yards, TD |
| TCU | Receiving | Taye Barber | 4 receptions, 99 yards, TD |
| West Virginia | Passing | JT Daniels | 23/39, 275 yards, 2 TD, INT |
| West Virginia | Rushing | CJ Donaldson | 19 rushes, 104 yards, 2 TD |
| West Virginia | Receiving | Sam James | 6 receptions, 95 yards |

=== At Iowa State ===
West Virginia Mountaineers (3–5) vs. Iowa State Cyclones (3–5) – Game summary

| Quarter | 1 | 2 | 3 | 4 | Total |
|---|---|---|---|---|---|
| Mountaineers | 0 | 7 | 0 | 7 | 14 |
| Cyclones | 3 | 7 | 0 | 21 | 31 |

at Jack Trice Stadium • Ames, IA

- Date: November 5
- Game time: 3:30 p.m. EDT
- Game weather: Sunny • Temperature: 48 °F (9 °C)
- Game attendance: 56,109
- Referee: Scott Campbell
- TV announcers (ESPN+): Mark Neely, Chad Brown, Shane Sparks

Game information
First quarter
- ISU - Jace Gilbert 30-yard field goal, 1:47. Cyclones 3–0. Drive: 8 plays, 45 yards, 3:06.

Second quarter

- ISU - DeShawn Hanika 16 Yd pass from Hunter Dekkers (Jace Gilbert Kick), 7:51. Cyclones 10–0. Drive: 13 plays, 86 yards, 7:02.
- WVU - Bryce Ford-Wheaton 25 Yd pass from JT Daniels (Casey Legg Kick), 0:34. Cyclones 10–7. Drive: 8 plays, 68 yards, 2:49.

Third quarter

- No scoring plays

Fourth quarter

- ISU - Xavier Hutchinson 24 Yd pass from Hunter Dekkers (Drake Nettles Kick), 13:24. Cyclones 17–7. Drive: 8 plays, 94 yards, 2:58.
- ISU - Cartevious Norton 5 Yd Run (Jace Gilbert Kick), 8:31. Cyclones 24–7. Drive: 7 plays, 64 yards, 4:11.
- ISU - Cartevious Norton 3 Yd Run (Drake Nettles Kick), 3:52. Cyclones 31–7. Drive: 4 plays, 34 yards, 2:48.
- WVU - Sam James 8 Yd pass from Garrett Greene (Casey Legg Kick), 1:04. Cyclones 31–14. Drive: 8 plays, 75 yards, 2:48.

Statistics

| Statistics | WVU | ISU |
|---|---|---|
| First downs | 11 | 26 |
| Total yards | 200 | 391 |
| Rushing yards | 76 | 172 |
| Passing yards | 124 | 219 |
| Turnovers | 1 | 0 |
| Time of possession | 21:45 | 38:15 |

| Team | Category | Player | Statistics |
|---|---|---|---|
| West Virginia | Passing | JT Daniels | 8/22, 81 yards, TD, INT |
| West Virginia | Rushing | Justin Johnson Jr. | 12 rushes, 48 yards |
| West Virginia | Receiving | Bryce Ford-Wheaton | 3 receptions, 38 yards, TD |
| Iowa State | Passing | Hunter Dekkers | 24/36, 219 yards, 2 TD |
| Iowa State | Rushing | Deon Silas | 6 rushes, 77 yards |
| Iowa State | Receiving | Xavier Hutchinson | 10 receptions, 123 yards, TD |

=== Oklahoma ===
Oklahoma Sooners (5–4, 2–4) v. West Virginia Mountaineers (3–6, 1–5) – Game summary

| Quarter | 1 | 2 | 3 | 4 | Total |
|---|---|---|---|---|---|
| Sooners | 0 | 12 | 8 | 0 | 20 |
| Mountaineers | 0 | 6 | 7 | 10 | 23 |

at Milan Puskar Stadium • Morgantown, WV

- Date: November 12
- Game time: 12:00 p.m. EST
- Game weather: Cloudy • Temperature: 51 °F (11 °C)
- Game attendance: 50,281
- Referee: David Alvarez
- TV announcers (FS1): Adam Alexander (play-by-play), Devin Gardner (analysts)

Game information

First Quarter

- No Score

Second Quarter

- (9:42) OKLA – Zach Schmit 32 yard FG (Drive: 9 plays, 75 yards, 3:18; OU 3–0)
- (1:06) OKLA – Eric Gray 12 yard rush, Zach Schmit kick (Drive: 4 plays, 96 yards, 1:02; OU 10–0)
- (0:33) WVU – Garrett Greene 5 yard rush, 2 point conversation failed (Drive: 3 plays, 53 yards, 0:26; OU 10–6)
- (0:33) OKLA – Billy Bowman Defensive PAT Conversion (Drive: 1 play, 88 yards; OU 12–6)

Third Quarter

- (3:36) WVU – Garrett Greene 8 yard pass to Bryce Ford – Wheaton, Casey Legg Kick (Drive: 12 plays, 63 yards, 6:18; WVU 13–12)
- (1:22) OKLA – Eric Gray 5 yard rush, Dillion Gabriel rush for 2 point conversion (Drive: 7 plays, 59 yards, 2:07; OU 20–12)

Fourth Quarter

- (11:20) WVU – Garrett Greene 11 yard rush, Casey Legg Kick (Drive: 12 plays, 72 yards, 4:57; Tied 20–20)
- (0:00) WVU – Casey Legg 25 yard FG (Drive: 15 plays, 65 yards, 6:24; WVU 23–20)

Statistics

| Statistics | OKLA | WVU |
|---|---|---|
| First downs | 22 | 25 |
| Total yards | 426 | 406 |
| Rushing yards | 236 | 203 |
| Passing yards | 190 | 230 |
| Turnovers | 0 | 2 |
| Time of possession | 22:45 | 37:15 |

| Team | Category | Player | Statistics |
|---|---|---|---|
| Oklahoma | Passing | Dillon Gabriel | 17/28, 190 yards |
| Oklahoma | Rushing | Eric Gray | 25 carries, 211 yards, 2 TD's |
| Oklahoma | Receiving | Jalil Farooq | 5 receptions, 49 yards |
| West Virginia | Passing | Garrett Greene | 12/22, 138 yards, 1 TD |
| West Virginia | Rushing | Garrett Greene | 14 carries, 119 yards, 2 TD |
| West Virginia | Receiving | Bryce Ford-Wheaton | 7 receptions, 36 yards, 1 TD |

=== No. 15 Kansas State ===
No. 15 Kansas State Wildcats (7–3) v. West Virginia Mountaineers (4–6) – Game summary

| Quarter | 1 | 2 | 3 | 4 | Total |
|---|---|---|---|---|---|
| No. 15 Wildcats | 28 | 13 | 0 | 7 | 48 |
| Mountaineers | 19 | 6 | 0 | 6 | 31 |

at Milan Puskar Stadium • Morgantown, WV

- Date: November 19
- Game time: 2:00 p.m. EST
- Game weather: Sunny • Temperature: 34 °F (1 °C) • Wind: W 10 MPH
- Game attendance: 37,055
- Referee: Derek Anderson
- TV announcers (ESPN+): Mark Neely (play-by-play), Barrett Brooks (analyst), Tori Petry (reporter)

Game information

First Quarter

- (12:52) KSU – Deuce Vaughn 15-yard run, Ty Zentner kick (Drive: 5 plays, 69 yards, 2:00; KSU 7–0)
- (11:51) KSU – Cincere Mason 37-yard interception, Ty Zentner kick (KSU 14–0)
- (8:26) WVU – Sam James 26-yard reception from Garrett Greene, Casey Legg kick (Drive: 8 plays, 75 yards, 3:25; KSU 14–7)
- (6:41) WVU – Malachi Ruffin 43-yard interception, Casey Legg kick failed (KSU 14–13)
- (5:12) KSU – DJ Giddens 49-yard run, Ty Zentner kick (Drive: 3 plays, 68 yards, 1:22; KSU 21–13)
- (2:17) KSU – Will Howard 1-yard run, Ty Zentner kick (Drive: 4 plays, 34 yards, 1:14; KSU 28–13)
- (1:22) WVU – Sam James 71-yard reception from Garrett Greene, Casey Legg kick failed (Drive: 2 plays, 81 yards, 0:48; KSU 28–19)

Second Quarter

- (13:28) KSU – Ben Sinnott 15-yard reception from Will Howard, Ty Zentner kick (Drive: 6 plays, 60 yards, 2:47; KSU 35–19)
- (6:55) WVU – Sam James 5-yard reception from Garrett Greene, 2-point conversion failed, Garrett Greene run (Drive: 11 plays, 87 yards, 6:26; KSU 35–25)
- (1:46) KSU – Ty Zentner 46-yard field goal (Drive: 12 plays, 37 yards, 5:09; KSU 38–25)
- (0:01) KSU – Ty Zentner 53-yard field goal (Drive: 6 plays, 30 yards, 1:19; KSU 41–25)

Third Quarter

- No scoring plays

Fourth Quarter

- (12:24) KSU – Malik Knowles 43-yard reception from Will Howard, Ty Zenter kick (Drive: 3 plays, 40 yards, 1:04; KSU 48–25)
- (9:30) WVU – Garrett Greene 13-yard run, 2 point conversion failed, Garrett Greene pass (Drive: 8 plays, 75 yards, 2:54; KSU 48–31)

Statistics

| Statistics | KSU | WVU |
|---|---|---|
| First downs | 21 | 21 |
| Total yards | 437 | 369 |
| Rushing yards | 143 | 153 |
| Passing yards | 294 | 216 |
| Turnovers | 1 | 2 |
| Time of possession | 31:37 | 28:23 |

| Team | Category | Player | Statistics |
|---|---|---|---|
| Kansas State | Passing | Will Howard | 19/27, 294 yards, 2 TD, INT |
| Kansas State | Rushing | DJ Giddens | 12 carries, 78 yards, TD |
| Kansas State | Receiving | Malik Knowles | 6 receptions, 111 yards, TD |
| West Virginia | Passing | Garrett Greene | 15/27, 204 yards, 3 TD, 2 INT |
| West Virginia | Rushing | Jaylen Anderson | 7 carries, 69 yards |
| West Virginia | Receiving | Sam James | 3 receptions, 102 yards, 3 TD |

=== At Oklahoma State ===
West Virginia Mountaineers (4–7) vs. Oklahoma State Cowboys (7–4) – Game summary

| Quarter | 1 | 2 | 3 | 4 | Total |
|---|---|---|---|---|---|
| Mountaineers | 7 | 14 | 0 | 3 | 24 |
| Cowboys | 0 | 10 | 9 | 0 | 19 |

at Boone Pickens Stadium • Stillwater, OK

- Date: November 26
- Game time: 12:00 p.m. EST
- Game weather: Rain • Temperature: 47 °F (8 °C)
- Game attendance: 52,353
- Referee: Tuta Salaam
- TV announcers (ESPN2): Jay Alter (play-by-play), Charles Arbuckle (analyst)

Game information

First Quarter

- (7:11) WVU – Garrett Greene 36 yard rush, Casey Legg kick (Drive: 1 play, 36 yards, 0:08; WVU 7–0)

Second Quarter

- (14:56) OSU – Brennan Presley 4 yard rush, Tanner Brown kick (Drive: 5 plays, 46 yards, 1:38; Tied 7–7)
- (0:14) OSU – Tanner Brown 22 yard FG (Drive: 12 plays, 73 yards, 2:04; OSU 10–7)

Third Quarter

- (12:45) WVU – Jaylen Anderson 54 yard rush, Casey Legg kick (Drive: 6 plays, 80 yards, 2:11; WVU 14–10)
- (9:53) WVU – Jaylen Anderson 57 yard rush, Casey Legg kick (Drive: 2 plays, 72 yards, 0:33; WVU 21–10)
- (5:59) OSU – Tanner Brown 38 yard FG (Drive: 10 plays, 42 yards, 3:47; WVU 21–13)
- (0:24) OSU – Ollie Gordon II 23 yard rush (Drive: 5 plays, 49 yards, 1:52; WVU 21–19)

Fourth Quarter

- (5:59) WVU – Casey Legg 34 yard FG (Drive: 9 plays, 44 yards, 5:19; WVU 24–19)

Statistics

| Statistics | WVU | OKST |
|---|---|---|
| First downs | 15 | 20 |
| Total yards | 327 | 358 |
| Rushing yards | 250 | 180 |
| Passing yards | 77 | 178 |
| Turnovers | 1 | 1 |
| Time of possession | 28:43 | 31:17 |

| Team | Category | Player | Statistics |
|---|---|---|---|
| West Virginia | Passing | Garrett Greene | 8/14, 48 yards, 1 INT |
| West Virginia | Rushing | Jaylen Anderson | 15 carries, 155 yards, 2 TD |
| West Virginia | Receiving | Bryce Ford-Wheaton | 2 receptions, 22 yards |
| Oklahoma State | Passing | Garret Rangel | 18/42, 178 yards |
| Oklahoma State | Rushing | Ollie Gordon II | 17 carries, 136 yards, 1 TD |
| Oklahoma State | Receiving | Brennan Presley | 5 receptions, 77 yards |

== Coaching staff ==
| Coach | Title | Year at West Virginia | Previous job |
|---|---|---|---|
| Neal Brown | Head coach | 4th | Troy |
| Matt Moore | Assistant head coach/OL | 4th | Troy (Co-OC/OL) |
| Graham Harrell | OC/QB | 1st | USC (OC/QB) |
| Chad Scott | RB/RGC | 4th | Louisville (RB) |
| Jeff Koonz | ILB/ST | 3rd | Ole Miss (ILB) |
| Jordan Lesley | Co-DC/OLB | 4th | Troy (DL) |
| Andrew Jackson | DL | 2nd | Old Dominion (DL) |
| Sean Reagan | TE | 4th | Troy (Co-OC/QB) |
| Tony Washington | WR | 1st | Coastal Carolina (WR) |
| Dontae Wright | S | 3rd | Western Michigan (S) |

== Players drafted into the NFL ==
| Round | Pick | Player | Position | NFL Club |
|---|---|---|---|---|
| 6 | 213 | Dante Stills | DT | Arizona Cardinals |
