= 2022 Sugar Bowl (December) =

Postseason college football bowl game

2022 Allstate Sugar Bowl
- CFP New Year's Six; 89th Sugar Bowl
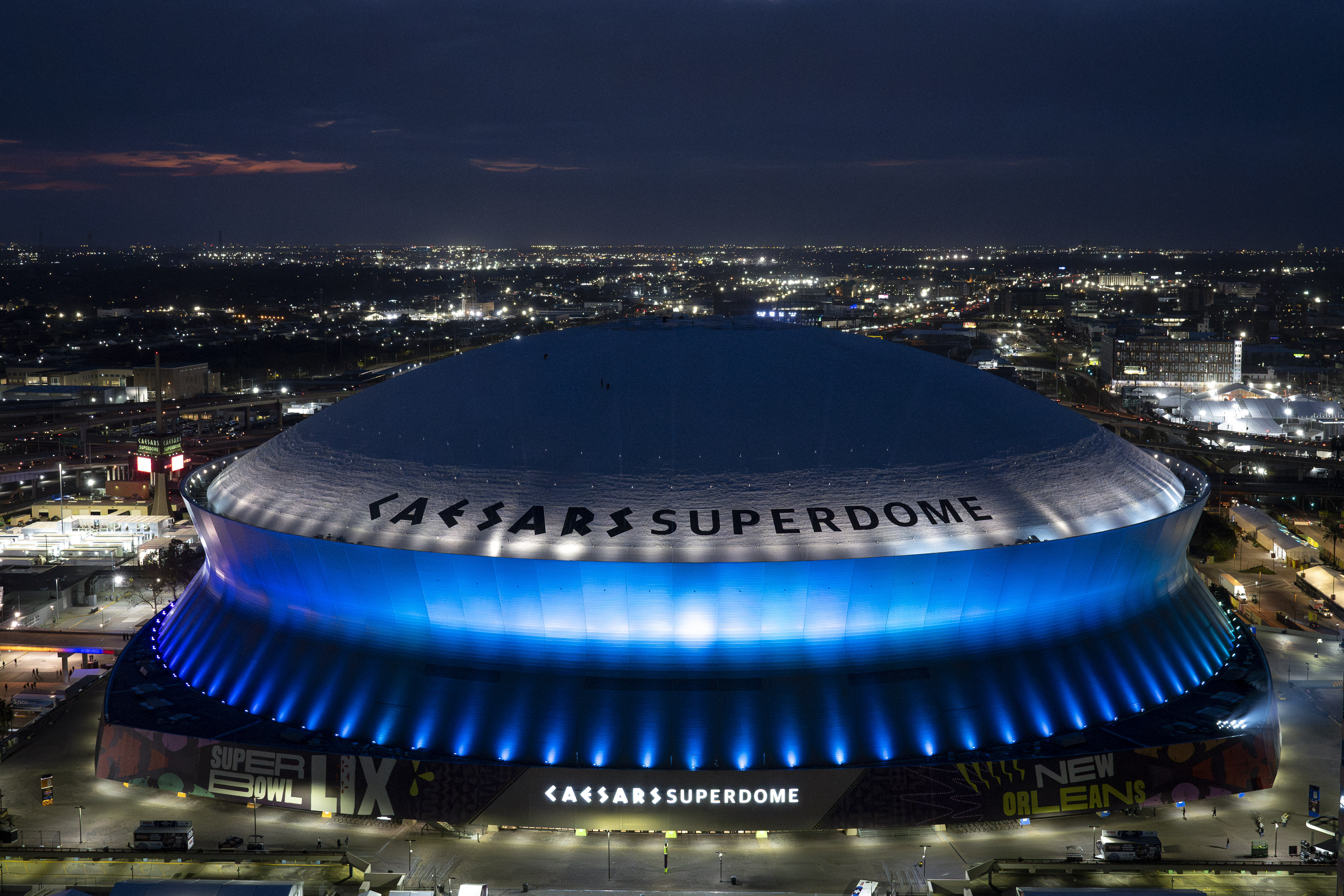
- Caesars Superdome in New Orleans, Louisiana, hosted the Sugar Bowl.
Alabama Crimson Tide	Kansas State Wildcats
(10–2)	(10–3)
SEC	Big 12
45	20
Head coach: Nick Saban	Head coach: Chris Klieman
AP / Coaches / CFP; 5 / 5 / 5	AP / Coaches / CFP; 11 / 9 / 9
	1	2	3	4	Total
Alabama	7	14	21	3	45
Kansas State	10	0	3	7	20
- Date: December 31, 2022
- Season: 2022
- Stadium: Caesars Superdome
- Location: New Orleans, Louisiana
- MVP: Bryce Young (QB, Alabama)
- Favorite: Alabama by 7.5
- National anthem: Berkley the Artist
- Referee: Larry Smith (Big Ten)
- Attendance: 60,437

United States TV coverage
- Network: ESPN
- Announcers: Dave Pasch (play-by-play), Dusty Dvoracek (analyst), and Tom Luginbill (sideline)

International TV coverage
- Network: ESPN Deportes

The 2022 Sugar Bowl was a college football bowl game played on December 31, 2022, at Caesars Superdome in New Orleans, Louisiana. The 89th annual Sugar Bowl, the game featured Kansas State from the Big 12 Conference and Alabama from the Southeastern Conference (SEC). The game began at 11:00 a.m. CST and was aired on ESPN. It was one of the 2022–23 bowl games concluding the 2022 FBS football season. Sponsored by insurance company Allstate, the game was officially known as the Allstate Sugar Bowl.

This game was the final Sugar Bowl with its conference tie in of SEC vs Big 12 before the expansion of the College Football Playoff to 12 teams in 2024 (2025 Calendar year) and hosting the final four team playoff semifinal in 2023 (2024 Calendar year).

Due to National Football League (NFL) scheduling considerations, New Year's Day bowl games are rescheduled when January 1 falls on a Sunday. As the NFL's 18-week regular season resulted in Monday Night Football (which Sugar Bowl rightsholder ESPN is committed to broadcast) being played in Week 17 on January 2, the Sugar Bowl was moved to December 31 for the first time since its 1995 edition.

== Teams ==
Consistent with conference tie-ins, the game featured Alabama from the Southeastern Conference (SEC) and Big 12 Conference champion Kansas State. In the final College Football Playoff (CFP) rankings, they were ranked fifth and ninth, respectively. This was the first meeting between the two programs.

=== Alabama ===
Alabama entered the season as one of the favorites to win both the SEC and the national championship, however, after getting off to a 6–0 start, they fell to Tennessee on a last-second field goal and were defeated by LSU in overtime. The later loss cost Alabama the SEC West title. The Crimson Tide finished their regular season with a 10–2 record, 6–2 in SEC play.

As SEC champion, Georgia finished with the number-one seed in the final CFP rankings, and thus advanced to the national semifinals, Alabama was selected for the Sugar Bowl as the next-highest ranked SEC team. This was Alabama's 17th Sugar Bowl appearance, having a record of 9–7 in prior appearances.

=== Kansas State ===
Kansas State began the season unranked, but after compiling a 7–2 conference record, they qualified for the Big 12 Championship Game, where they upset TCU, 31–28 in overtime. Kansas State had lost to TCU during the regular season, along with losses to Tulane and Texas. They defeated two ranked teams, Oklahoma and Oklahoma State. As a result of winning a Power Five championship, the Wildcats earned an automatic bid to a New Years Six game. The Wildcats were invited to the Sugar Bowl, which, since the 2015 season, normally invites the Big 12 champion, notwithstanding CFP semifinal scheduling. This was Kansas State's first appearance in the Sugar Bowl. They enter the bowl with an overall 10–3 record.

== Game summary ==
2022 Allstate Sugar Bowl

Quarter	1	2	3	4	Total
No. 5 Alabama	7	14	21	3	45
No. 9 Kansas State	10	0	3	7	20

at Caesars Superdome • New Orleans, Louisiana

- Date: Saturday, December 31, 2022
- Game time: 11:00 a.m. CST
- Game weather: n/a (game played indoors)
- Game attendance: 60,437
- Referee: Larry Smith
- TV announcers (ESPN): Dave Pasch (play-by-play), Dusty Dvoracek (analyst), and Tom Luginbill (field analyst)
- Box score

Scoring summary

Quarter	Time	Drive			Team	Scoring information	Score	
Quarter	Time	Plays	Yards	TOP	Team	Scoring information	Alabama	Kansas State
1	6:17	11	38	4:45	Kansas State	41-yard field goal by Ty Zentner	0	3
1	3:40	1	88	0:14	Kansas State	Deuce Vaughn 88-yard touchdown run, Ty Zentner kick good	0	10
1	0:32	6	69	2:46	Alabama	Isaiah Bond 6-yard touchdown reception from Bryce Young, Will Reichard kick good	7	10
2	11:33	6	63	3:09	Alabama	Cameron Latu 1-yard touchdown reception from Bryce Young, Will Reichard kick good	14	10
2	0:10	7	98	0:51	Alabama	Jermaine Burton 12-yard touchdown reception from Bryce Young, Will Reichard kick good	21	10
3	13:54	3	46	1:05	Alabama	Ja'Corey Brooks 32-yard touchdown reception from Bryce Young, Will Reichard kick good	28	10
3	13:00	1	17	0:08	Alabama	Jase McClellan 17-yard touchdown run, Will Reichard kick good	35	10
3	6:33	8	54	2:17	Kansas State	28-yard field goal by Ty Zentner	35	13
3	0:00	3	51	1:32	Alabama	Kobe Prentice 47-yard touchdown reception from Bryce Young, Will Reichard kick good	42	13
4	11:00	6	19	2:31	Alabama	49-yard field goal by Will Reichard	45	13
4	3:06	10	71	4:27	Kansas State	Jordan Schippers 1-yard touchdown run, Ty Zentner kick good	45	20
"TOP" = time of possession. For other American football terms, see Glossary of American football.							45	20

== Statistics ==
Team statistical comparison
Statistic	Alabama	Kansas State
First downs	17	18
First downs rushing	8	5
First downs passing	9	12
First downs penalty	0	1
Third down efficiency	4–10	7–18
Fourth down efficiency	0–0	2–3
Total plays–net yards	55–496	74–401
Rushing attempts–net yards	33–175	39–191
Yards per rush	5.3	4.9
Yards passing	321	210
Pass completions–attempts	15–22	18–35
Interceptions thrown	0	2
Punt returns–total yards	1–15	1–1
Kickoff returns–total yards	2–31	5–67
Punts–average yardage	5–38.4	5–42.0
Fumbles–lost	0–0	0–0
Penalties–yards	5–45	6–40
Time of possession	24:56	35:04

Alabama statistics
Crimson Tide passing
	C–A	Yds	TD–INT
Bryce Young	15–21	321	5–0
Jalen Milroe	0–1	0	0–0
Crimson Tide rushing
	Car	Yds	TD
Jahmyr Gibbs	15	76	0
Jamarion Miller	3	44	0
Jase McClellan	7	42	1
Roydell Williams	5	23	0
Bryce Young	3	-10	0
Crimson Tide receiving
	Rec	Yds	TD
Jermaine Burton	3	87	1
Jahmyr Gibbs	2	66	0
Cameron Latu	5	54	1
Ja'Corey Brooks	2	51	1
Kobe Prentice	1	47	1
Jase McClellan	1	10	0
Isaiah Bond	1	6	1

Kansas State statistics
Wildcats passing
	C–A	Yds	TD–INT
Will Howard	18–35	210	0–2
Wildcats rushing
	Car	Yds	TD
Deuce Vaughn	22	133	1
DJ Giddens	9	67	0
Adrian Martinez	2	12	0
Malik Knowles	1	2	0
Jordan Schippers	1	1	1
Team	1	-1	0
Will Howard	3	-23	0
Wildcats receiving
	Rec	Yds	TD
Ben Sinnott	3	48	0
DJ Giddens	3	48	0
Kade Warner	5	48	0
Phillip Brooks	4	44	0
Jadon Jackson	2	16	0
Malik Knowles	1	6	0

== See also ==
- 2022 New Orleans Bowl, contested at the same venue on December 21
