= 2022 Big 12 Championship Game =

2022 Dr Pepper Big 12 Championship Game
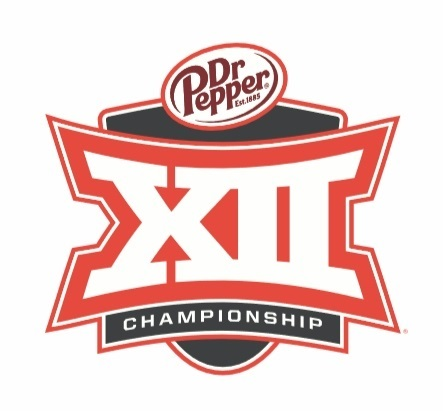
Kansas State Wildcats	TCU Horned Frogs
(9–3)	(12–0)
31	28
Head coach: Chris Klieman	Head coach: Sonny Dykes
AP / Coaches / CFP; 13 / 10 / 10	AP / Coaches / CFP; 3 / 3 / 3
	1	2	3	4	OT	Total
Kansas State	7	7	7	7	3	31
TCU	7	3	7	11	0	28
- Date: December 3, 2022
- Season: 2022
- Stadium: AT&T Stadium
- Location: Arlington, Texas
- MVP: Deuce Vaughn (RB, Kansas State)
- Favorite: Kansas State by 1
- National anthem: Ashanti
- Referee: Kevin Mar
- Attendance: 69,335

United States TV coverage
- Network: ABC; ESPN Radio
- Announcers: ABC: Chris Fowler, Kirk Herbstreit, Holly Rowe; ESPN Radio: Mike Couzens, Max Starks

International TV coverage
- Network: ESPN Brazil
- Announcers: Matheus Pinheiro (play-by-play) and Eduardo Zolin (analyst)

2022 Big 12 Conference football standings
	Conf.			Overall
Team	W		L	W		L
No. 2 TCU y^	9	–	0	13	–	2
No. 14 Kansas State y$	7	–	2	10	–	4
No. 25 Texas	6	–	3	8	–	5
Texas Tech	5	–	4	8	–	5
Oklahoma State	4	–	5	7	–	6
Baylor	4	–	5	6	–	7
Oklahoma	3	–	6	6	–	7
Kansas	3	–	6	6	–	7
West Virginia	3	–	6	5	–	7
Iowa State	1	–	8	4	–	8
Championship: Kansas State 31, TCU 28 ^{OT}
^ – College Football Playoff participant; $ – Conference champion; y – Championship game participant; Rankings from AP Poll

The 2022 Big 12 Championship Game was a college football game played on December 3, 2022, at AT&T Stadium in Arlington, Texas. It was the 21st edition of the Big 12 Championship Game, and determined the champion of the Big 12 Conference for the 2022 season. The game began at 11:00 a.m. CST on ABC. The game featured the TCU Horned Frogs and the Kansas State Wildcats. Sponsored by soft drink company Keurig Dr Pepper through its flagship Dr Pepper brand, the game was officially known as the Dr Pepper Big 12 Championship Game.

== Teams ==
The two teams met in the regular season on October 22, with TCU winning 38–28. This was the seventeenth meeting between the two teams, with the all time series tied at 8–8 heading into the game.

=== TCU ===
The Horned Frogs clinched a spot in the game following their defeat of Texas on November 12. The Horned Frogs entered the championship game with a perfect 12–0 record and a conference record of 9–0. This was TCU's second appearance in the championship game, having lost 17–41 to Oklahoma in the 2017 game.

=== Kansas State ===
The Wildcats clinched a spot in the game following their victory against in-state rivals Kansas on November 26. The Wildcats entered the championship game with a record of 9–3 and a conference record of 7–2. Kansas State's losses were against Tulane, TCU, and Texas. This was Kansas State's fourth appearance in the championship game, appearing in the 1998, 2000, and 2003 games, losing in 1998 and 2000 and winning in 2003.

== Game summary ==
2022 Dr Pepper Big 12 Championship Game

Quarter	1	2	3	4	OT	Total
No. 10 Kansas State	7	7	7	7	3	31
No. 3 TCU	7	3	7	11	0	28

at AT&T Stadium • Arlington, Texas

- Date: December 3, 2022
- Game time: 11:00 a.m. CST
- Game weather: None (retractable roof closed)
- Game attendance: 69,335
- Referee: Kevin Mar
- TV announcers (ABC): Chris Fowler, Kirk Herbstreit, Holly Rowe
- Box score

Game information

First quarter

- TCU – Taye Barber 1-yard pass from Max Duggan (Griffin Kell kick), 5:00. Horned Frogs 7–0. Drive: 13 plays, 92 yards, 6:57.
- KSU – Ben Sinnott 6-yard pass from Will Howard (Ty Zentner kick), 0:15. Tied 7–7. Drive: 6 plays, 63 yards, 2:15.

Second quarter

- KSU – Will Howard 1-yard run (Ty Zentner kick), 10:16. Wildcats 14–7. Drive: 3 plays, 59 yards, 0:49.
- TCU – Griffin Kell 42-yard field goal, 0:29. Wildcats 14–10. Drive: 8 plays, 56 yards, 1:40.

Third quarter

- KSU – RJ Garcia II 25-yard pass from Will Howard (Ty Zentner kick), 12:19. Wildcats 21–10. Drive: 4 plays, 62 yards, 1:35.
- TCU – Kendre Miller 6-yard run (Griffin Kell kick), 9:09. Wildcats 21–17. Drive: 3 plays, 30 yards, 1:11.

Fourth quarter

- KSU – Deuce Vaughn 44-yard run (Ty Zentner kick), 11:27. Wildcats 28–17. Drive: 6 plays, 80 yards, 3:28.
- TCU – Griffin Kell 42-yard field goal, 7:34. Wildcats 28–20. Drive: 10 plays, 51 yards, 3:53.
- TCU – Max Duggan 8-yard run (Max Duggan pass to Jared Wiley), 1:51. Tied 28–28. Drive: 8 plays, 80 yards, 2:56.

Overtime

- KSU – Ty Zentner 31-yard field goal. Wildcats 31–28. Drive: 6 plays, 12 yards.

Fighting for a spot in the College Football Playoff, TCU would score first with a 1-yard touchdown reception by Taye Barber.

Kansas State would respond with two touchdown drives to take a 14–7 lead in the middle of the 2nd quarter. By the end of the 1st half, TCU trimmed the Wildcats' lead to four with a 42-yard field goal.

Kansas State would take their first double-digit lead with an RJ Garcia 25-yard TD reception, only for TCU to respond with a touchdown of their own. Afterward, the frogs had a chance to reclaim the lead; they made it all the way to the 8-yard line, where Max Duggan's pass to Quentin Johnston was intercepted by Julius Brents in the end zone.

The interception would turn into a touchdown drive capped off by a 44-yard run by Deuce Vaughn, sending Kansas State's lead back to 11. TCU once again responded with another 42-yard goal. Kansas State would not score on their next drive, giving TCU one more chance.

At the 3:08 mark in the 4th quarter, TCU's apparent touchdown reception by Jordan Hudson was called back due to an offensive pass interference penalty. However, Max Duggan would make it up for it by running for a 1st down on 2nd & 20 that same drive. With less than 2 minutes to go, TCU tied the game with an 8-yard QB run and a successful pass to Jared Wiley. Kansas State reached midfield but could not go any further, so they punted, and TCU ran out the clock to go to overtime.

TCU won the coin toss and started on the right side of the field. On their 1st drive of OT, they made it to within one yard of scoring a TD on 3rd & goal, but Kendre Miller was stopped by the Kansas State defense. With 4th down at the one, TCU elected to go for it, giving the ball to Kendre Miller again, but was once again stopped by the Wildcats' defense, and TCU turned it over on downs.

Afterward, Ty Zentner clinched the Big 12 title for Kansas State with a 31-yard field goal.

== Statistics ==
=== Team statistics ===
Team statistical comparison
Statistic	Kansas State	TCU
First downs	20	18
First downs rushing	9	9
First downs passing	11	7
First downs penalty	0	2
Third down efficiency	5 of 16	2 of 15
Fourth down efficiency	2 of 3	3 of 4
Total plays–net yards	76–404	73–469
Rushing attempts–net yards	44–205	37–218
Yards per rush	4.7	5.9
Yards passing	199	251
Pass completions–attempts	18–32	18–36
Interceptions thrown	0	1
Punt returns–total yards	2–14	2–7
Kickoff returns–total yards	6–138	4–76
Punts–total yardage	7–319	5–224
Fumbles–lost	1–1	1–1
Penalties–yards	4–40	4–45
Time of possession	32:00	28:00

=== Individual statistics ===
Kansas State statistics
Wildcats passing
	C–A	Yds	TD	INT
Will Howard	18–32	199	2	0
Wildcats rushing
	Car	Yds	TD	Avg
Deuce Vaughn	26	130	1	5.0
Malik Knowles	2	48	0	24.0
DJ Giddens	6	29	0	4.8
Phillip Brooks	1	4	0	4.0
Will Howard	8	–3	1	–0.4
TEAM	1	–3	0	–3.0
Wildcats receiving
	Rec	Yds	TD	Avg
Phillip Brooks	6	48	0	8.0
Malik Knowles	1	40	0	40.0
Ben Sinnott	2	32	1	16.0
Deuce Vaughn	2	30	0	15.0
RJ Garcia II	2	27	1	13.5
Kade Warner	5	22	0	4.4

TCU statistics
Horned Frogs passing
	C–A	Yds	TD	INT
Max Duggan	18–36	251	1	1
Horned Frogs rushing
	Car	Yds	TD	Avg
Max Duggan	15	110	1	7.3
Kendre Miller	17	82	1	4.8
Emari Demercado	4	27	0	6.8
Horned Frogs receiving
	Rec	Yds	TD	Avg
Quentin Johnston	4	139	0	34.8
Jared Wiley	4	28	0	7.0
Taye Barber	3	26	1	8.7
Derius Davis	2	25	0	12.5
Trent Battle	1	21	0	21.0
Savion Williams	1	6	0	6.0
Geor'quarius Spivey	1	5	0	5.0
Kendre Miller	2	1	0	0.5

== See also ==
- List of Big 12 Conference football champions
