= Chris Klieman =

American football coach (born 1967)

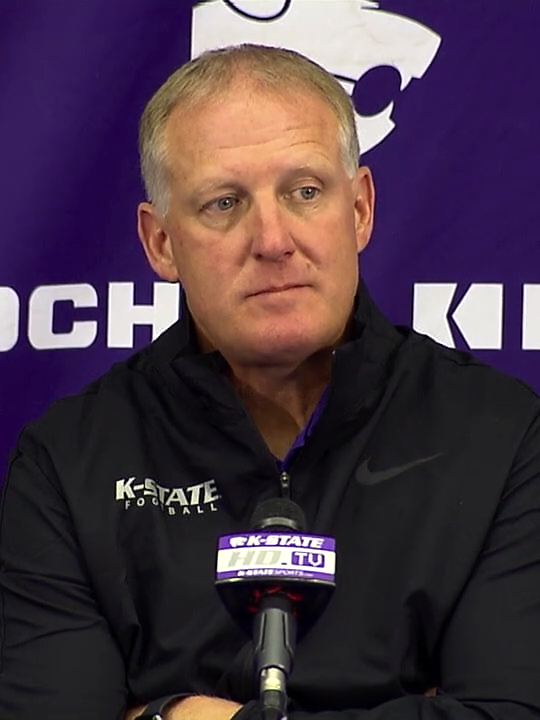
- Klieman in 2022

Biographical details
- Born: September 27, 1967 (age 59); Waterloo, Iowa, U.S.

Playing career
- 1986–1990: Northern Iowa
- Position: Defensive back

Coaching career (HC unless noted)
- 1991–1992: Northern Iowa (GA)
- 1993: Northern Iowa (DB)
- 1994–1996: Western Illinois (DB)
- 1997: Kansas (GA)
- 1999: Missouri State (DB)
- 2002–2004: Loras (DC)
- 2005: Loras
- 2006–2007: Northern Iowa (DB)
- 2008: Northern Iowa (Co-DC/DB)
- 2009–2010: Northern Iowa (DC/DB)
- 2011: North Dakota State (DB)
- 2012–2013: North Dakota State (DC)
- 2014–2018: North Dakota State
- 2019–2025: Kansas State

Head coaching record
- Overall: 126–47
- Bowls: 3–2
- Tournaments: 18–1 (NCAA D-I playoffs)

Accomplishments and honors

Championships
- 4 NCAA Division I FCS (2014–2015, 2017–2018); 5 MVFC (2014–2018); 1 Big 12 (2022)

Awards
- MVFC Coach of the Year (2017)

Christopher Paul Klieman (/ˈklaɪmən/ KLY-muhn; born September 27, 1967) is an American retired college football coach. He was most recently the head football coach at Kansas State University from 2019 until his retirement in December 2025. Klieman served as the head football coach at North Dakota State University from 2014 to 2018. He succeeded the retiring Bill Snyder at Kansas State after leading the North Dakota State Bison to four NCAA Division I Football Championship titles in five seasons.

== Early life ==
Klieman was born on September 27, 1967, in Waterloo, Iowa to Robert "Bob" Klieman and Mary Kay. He was raised in Waterloo and graduated from Columbus Catholic High School in 1986. Through high school he was a star athlete, competing as quarterback and defensive back on the football team. His father Bob, a Hall of Fame official and a long time coach of both golf and football at Columbus Catholic High School, is also a member of the Upper Iowa University Athletic Hall of Fame. Klieman has two siblings, a sister, Sarah, and a brother, Scott.

After high school, Klieman attended the University of Northern Iowa where he played in the defensive secondary for the Panthers football team from 1986 to 1990.

== Coaching career ==
After graduating from Northern Iowa in 1990, Klieman began coaching for the Panthers under then-head coach Terry Allen until 1993. Klieman accepted a position with Western Illinois and stayed there for 3 seasons until 1996. In 1997, he enjoyed a brief season stay with Kansas as a defensive backs coach and one season with Missouri State in 1999. He then spent five seasons at Loras College from 2001 to 2005, serving as defensive coordinator from 2002 to 2004. In 2005, he accepted his first head coaching position, leading the Division III Loras Duhawks to a 3–7 record. In early 2006, he stepped down from his head coaching position at Loras to accept the defensive backs coaching position back at his alma mater, Northern Iowa. He became co-defensive coordinator the next year and held that position until leaving for North Dakota State in 2011.

=== North Dakota State ===
In 2011, Craig Bohl hired Klieman as a defensive backs coach. He became the defensive coordinator the following season in 2012 until being promoted in 2014. After Bohl announced that he was leaving to become the head coach of Wyoming, then-athletic director Gene Taylor promoted Klieman to become the 30th head football coach in Bison history in 2014.

After winning three consecutive National Championships and going 43–2 since 2011, the expectations for the 2014 team were not high. The Bison had lost their starting quarterback and a total of 30 seniors who graduated before the season started. But 2014 surprised everyone when he and future 2nd overall NFL draft pick Carson Wentz led the Bison to a 15–1 overall record and a fourth consecutive national championship by beating Illinois State in a close, hard-fought championship game. NDSU became the first Division 1 football program to win four consecutive championships.

In 2015, the Bison continued their winning ways and ended the season 13–2 with a fifth consecutive national championship, the most by any NCAA football program in history.

In 2016, the Bison again won their conference title, but lost in the FCS semi-finals to James Madison, their first playoff loss in 6 years. They ended the year at 12–2, their sixth straight season with double-digit wins. The 2017 season continued the Bison dominance by again going 10–1 and winning their seventh consecutive MVFC title and avenging the previous year's loss to James Madison by beating them in the Championship Game 17–13. It was Klieman's third national championship in four seasons and the Bison's sixth in seven years. They won it all again in 2018.

=== Kansas State ===
On December 10, 2018, Kansas State University Athletic Director Gene Taylor announced Klieman had been hired as the program's 35th head coach to replace the recently retired Bill Snyder. Taylor, who promoted Klieman to head coach at North Dakota State, had recently been named athletic director at Kansas State. Klieman signed a six-year contract worth $16.8 million.

On December 3, 2022, Klieman led Kansas State to a 31–28 overtime victory over TCU to win the Big 12 Championship. They earned a berth in the Sugar Bowl where they fell 45–20 to Alabama.

Following a disappointing 2025 season, Klieman announced his retirement from coaching on December 3, 2025. His 54 wins at Kansas State are second in school history behind only Snyder's 215.

== Head coaching record ==
Year	Team	Overall	Conference	Standing	Bowl/playoffs	Coaches^{#}	AP^{°}
Loras Duhawks (Iowa Intercollegiate Athletic Conference) (2005)
2005	Loras	3–7	2–6	7th			
Loras:		3–7	2–6				
North Dakota State Bison (Missouri Valley Football Conference) (2014–2018)
2014	North Dakota State	15–1	7–1	T–1st	W NCAA Division I Championship	1	1
2015	North Dakota State	13–2	7–1	T–1st	W NCAA Division I Championship	1	1
2016	North Dakota State	12–2	7–1	T–1st	L NCAA Division I Semifinal	3	3
2017	North Dakota State	14–1	7–1	1st	W NCAA Division I Championship	1	1
2018	North Dakota State	15–0	8–0	1st	W NCAA Division I Championship	1	1
North Dakota State:		69–6	36–4				
Kansas State Wildcats (Big 12 Conference) (2019–2025)
2019	Kansas State	8–5	5–4	T–3rd	L Liberty		
2020	Kansas State	4–6	4–5	7th			
2021	Kansas State	8–5	4–5	T–5th	W Texas		
2022	Kansas State	10–4	7–2	1st	L Sugar^{†}	14	14
2023	Kansas State	9–4	6–3	T–4th	W Pop-Tarts	19	18
2024	Kansas State	9–4	5–4	T–8th	W Rate		
2025	Kansas State	6–6	5–4	T–7th			
Kansas State:		54–34	36–27				
Total:		126–47					
National championship Conference title Conference division title or championship game berth
^{†}Indicates Bowl Coalition, Bowl Alliance, BCS, or CFP / New Years' Six bowl.; ^{#}Rankings from final Coaches Poll.; ^{°}Rankings from final AP Poll.
