= Deuce Vaughn =

American football player (born 2001)

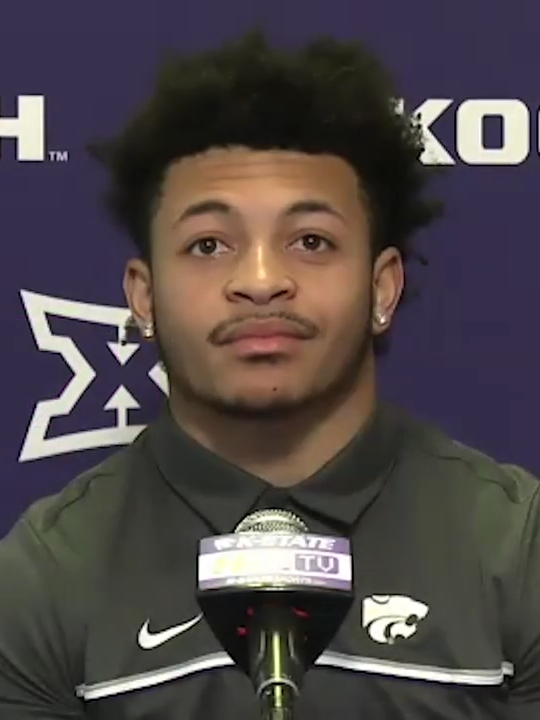
- Vaughn with the Kansas State Wildcats in 2021

Profile
- Position: Running back

Personal information
- Born: November 2, 2001 (age 25); Fayetteville, Arkansas, U.S.
- Listed height: 5 ft 5 in (1.65 m)
- Listed weight: 185 lb (84 kg)

Career information
- High school: Cedar Ridge (Round Rock, Texas)
- College: Kansas State (2020–2022)
- NFL draft: 2023: 6th round, 212th overall pick

Career history
- Dallas Cowboys (2023–2024); Denver Broncos (2025)*; Orlando Storm (2026); Houston Texans (2026)*
- * Offseason or practice squad member only

Awards and highlights
- Consensus All-American (2022); Big 12 Offensive Freshman of the Year (2020); First-team All-Big 12 (2022); 2× Second-team All-Big 12 (2020, 2021)

Career NFL statistics as of 2025
- Rushing yards: 110
- Rushing average: 2.8
- Receptions: 10
- Receiving yards: 58
- Stats at Pro Football Reference

Christopher "Deuce" Vaughn II (born November 2, 2001) is an American professional football running back. He played college football for the Kansas State Wildcats and was selected by the Dallas Cowboys in the sixth round of the 2023 NFL draft. He has also been a member of the Denver Broncos. Vaughn is known for being the shortest running back to ever be drafted in the NFL.

== Early life ==
Vaughn moved frequently growing up due to his father's occupation as a college football coach before settling in Round Rock, Texas, and attended Cedar Ridge High School, where he played football and ran track.

As a junior, he collected 1,901 rushing yards, 21 rushing touchdowns, 9 receptions, 159 receiving yards and one receiving touchdown. He received honorable-mention all-state honors from the Texas Sports Writers Association.

As a senior, Vaughn broke Cedar Ridge's single-season rushing record with 1,938 yards, while having 589 receiving yards and 25 touchdowns. He rushed for 375 yards against Round Rock High School and 302 yards with 5 touchdowns against Westwood High School. He received his second straight District 13-6A Offensive MVP award.

He finished his high school career with 4,405 rushing yards and 38 rushing touchdowns, 914 receiving yards, 11 receiving touchdowns, 153 return yards and 5,472 all-purpose yards. Despite his size, Vaughn was a 3-star recruit who received multiple scholarship offers from programs like Air Force, Arkansas, Army, Kansas, Missouri, North Texas, South Florida, UTSA, and Wyoming, with preferred walk-on offers from Baylor, Oklahoma State, New Mexico, Texas Christian, and Virginia Tech.

== College career ==
=== 2020 season ===
Vaughn accepted a football scholarship from Kansas State University. He entered his freshman season as one of the Wildcats' top running backs and became the team's starter over Harry Trotter early in the season. He had three games on the season going over 100 rushing yards: Texas Tech, Baylor, and Texas. He recorded a 129-yard receiving game against Oklahoma.

He registered 123 carries for 642 rushing yards, seven rushing touchdowns, 25 receptions for 434 yards, two receiving touchdowns, and seven kickoff returns for 145 yards. He was named the Big 12 Conference Offensive Freshman of the Year and second-team All-Conference.

=== 2021 season ===
Vaughn entered his sophomore season on the watch list for the Doak Walker Award. He tallied 235 carries for 1,404 yards (6-yard avg.), 18 rushing touchdowns, 49 receptions for 468 yards (9-yard avg.) and four receiving touchdowns. He had nine games on the year going over 100 rushing yards to go with one game going over 100 receiving yards.

He posted 162 rushing yards (career-high), 70 receiving yards, and three rushing touchdowns, including an 80-yard touchdown run against Kansas. He had 146 rushing yards, three rushing touchdowns and one receiving touchdown in the 2022 Texas Bowl 42–20 win against LSU. He was named as a Consensus All-American.

=== 2022 season ===
As a junior, he recorded 293 carries for 1,558 yards (5.3-yard avg.), nine rushing touchdowns, 42 receptions for 378 yards (9-yard avg.), three receiving touchdowns and 1,936 all-purpose yards. He became the third player in school history with multiple 1,000-yard rushing seasons and the first player with 1,000 rushing yards and 1,000 receiving yards in a career.

He had 147 rushing yards and a touchdown in the regular-season finale against the Kansas. He tallied 130 rushing yards and one touchdown in the Big 12 Championship Game 31–28 overtime victory against TCU. He had 133 rushing yards, including an 88-yard touchdown, in the 45–20 2022 Sugar Bowl loss against Alabama. At the end of the season, he chose to forgo his senior season to enter the 2023 NFL draft.

He finished his college career with 651 carries (second in school history), 3,604 rushing yards (second in school history), 5.5-yard average, 34 rushing touchdowns, twenty one 100-yard rushing games (second in school history), 116 receptions for 1,280 yards (11-yard avg.), 9 receiving touchdowns, 7 kickoff returns for 145 yards (20.7-yard avg.), 5,029 all-purpose yards (third in school history), 258 points scored (sixth in school history) and 279 rushing yards in bowl games (school record). He was one of just two Big 12 players to ever register 3,600 rushing yards and 1,250 receiving yards in a career (DeMarco Murray). He was named a consensus All-American for the 2022 season.

=== College statistics ===
| Year | Team | Games | | Rushing | | | | Receiving | | | | Kick returns | | | |
| Year | Team | GP | GS | Att | Yds | Avg | TD | Rec | Yds | Avg | TD | Ret | Yds | Avg | TD |
|---|---|---|---|---|---|---|---|---|---|---|---|---|---|---|---|
| 2020 | Kansas State | 10 | 7 | 123 | 642 | 5.2 | 7 | 25 | 434 | 17.4 | 2 | 7 | 145 | 20.7 | 0 |
| 2021 | Kansas State | 13 | 13 | 235 | 1,404 | 6.0 | 18 | 49 | 468 | 9.6 | 4 | 0 | 0 | 0.0 | 0 |
| 2022 | Kansas State | 12 | 12 | 293 | 1,558 | 5.3 | 9 | 40 | 348 | 8.7 | 3 | 0 | 0 | 0.0 | 0 |
| Career | | 35 | 32 | 651 | 3,604 | 5.5 | 34 | 114 | 1,250 | 10.9 | 9 | 7 | 145 | 20.7 | 0 |

== Professional career ==
Pre-draft measurables
| Height | Weight | Arm length | Hand span | Wingspan | 40-yard dash | 10-yard split | 20-yard split | 20-yard shuttle | Three-cone drill | Vertical jump | Broad jump | Bench press |
|---|---|---|---|---|---|---|---|---|---|---|---|---|
| 5 ft 5 in (1.65 m) | 179 lb (81 kg) | 27 3/4 in (0.70 m) | 9 1/2 in (0.24 m) | 5 ft 7 in (1.70 m) | 4.56 s | 1.59 s | 2.67 s | 4.22 s | 7.10 s | 35.5 in (0.90 m) | 9 ft 8 in (2.95 m) | 17 reps |
All values from NFL Combine/Pro Day

=== Dallas Cowboys ===
Vaughn was selected by the Dallas Cowboys in the sixth round (212th overall) of the 2023 NFL draft. His father, who is a scout for the Cowboys, called Vaughn to tell him he had been drafted. With a measurement at the combine of 5'5", Vaughn became the shortest running back ever drafted since the NFL began tracking the combine. On January 3, 2024, he was placed on the reserve/injured list with an ankle injury. He appeared in seven games as a third-string running back, compiling 23 rushes for 40 yards, seven receptions for 40 yards and four punt returns for 19 yards. He was declared inactive in nine games.

In 2024, he appeared in eight games as a backup running back and was declared inactive in nine games. He registered 17 carries for 70 yards and three receptions for 18 yards.

On August 26, 2025, Vaughn was waived by the Cowboys as part of final roster cuts.

=== Denver Broncos ===
On September 9, 2025, Vaughn was signed to the Denver Broncos' practice squad. On January 26, 2026, he signed a futures contract with the Broncos. On May 12, Vaughn was waived by the Broncos following the signing of Michael Woods II.

=== Orlando Storm ===
On May 30, 2026, Vaughn signed with the Orlando Storm of the United Football League (UFL).

=== Houston Texans ===
On August 24, 2026, Vaughn signed with the Houston Texans. He was released by the Texans as a part of final roster cuts on August 30. On October 7, Vaughn was signed to the practice squad. He was released on November 2.

=== NFL career statistics ===
| Year | Team | Games | | Rushing | | | | | Receiving | | | | | Punt returns | | | | | Fumbles | |
| Year | Team | GP | GS | Att | Yds | Avg | Lng | TD | Rec | Yds | Avg | Lng | TD | Ret | Yds | Avg | Lng | TD | Fum | Lost |
|---|---|---|---|---|---|---|---|---|---|---|---|---|---|---|---|---|---|---|---|---|
| 2023 | DAL | 7 | 0 | 23 | 40 | 1.7 | 13 | 0 | 7 | 40 | 5.7 | 11 | 0 | 1 | 10 | 10.0 | 10 | 0 | 0 | 0 |
| 2024 | DAL | 7 | 0 | 17 | 70 | 4.1 | 12 | 0 | 3 | 18 | 6.0 | 8 | 0 | 0 | 0 | 0.0 | 0 | 0 | 0 | 0 |
| Career | | 14 | 0 | 40 | 110 | 2.8 | 13 | 0 | 10 | 58 | 5.8 | 11 | 0 | 1 | 10 | 10.0 | 10 | 0 | 0 | 0 |

== Personal life ==
Vaughn's father, Chris, played college football at Murray State and is a scout for the Dallas Cowboys after previously working as an assistant coach at Arkansas, Ole Miss, Memphis and Texas. Deuce was a member of Kappa Alpha Psi fraternity.
