= JuJu Brents =

American football player (born 2000)

No. 8 – Miami Dolphins
- Position: Cornerback
- Roster status: Active

Personal information
- Born: January 18, 2000 (age 26); Indianapolis, Indiana, U.S.
- Listed height: 6 ft 3 in (1.91 m)
- Listed weight: 203 lb (92 kg)

Career information
- High school: Warren Central (Indianapolis)
- College: Iowa (2018–2020); Kansas State (2021–2022)
- NFL draft: 2023: 2nd round, 44th overall pick

Career history
- Indianapolis Colts (2023–2024); Miami Dolphins (2025–present)

Awards and highlights
- First-team All-Big 12 (2022)

Career NFL statistics as of Week 11, 2025
- Total tackles: 64
- Forced fumbles: 1
- Fumble recoveries: 2
- Pass deflections: 7
- Interceptions: 1
- Stats at Pro Football Reference

Julius "JuJu" Brents (born January 18, 2000) is an American professional football cornerback for the Miami Dolphins of the National Football League (NFL). He played college football for the Iowa Hawkeyes and Kansas State, and was selected in the second round (44th overall) of the 2023 NFL draft by the Indianapolis Colts.

== Early life ==
JuJu Brents attended Warren Central High School in Indianapolis, Indiana. A rangy defensive back, Brents played only three games of the 2016 season due to injury.

On September 1, 2017, Brents committed to the University of Iowa to play college football. Brents was ranked as the 33rd best safety in the country and the number 401 prospect overall by 247Sports.com at the time of the signing of his letter of intent to play for Iowa. The 6'2" Brents was a highly recruited college prospect, declining scholarship offers from Michigan State, Indiana, Cincinnati, and Louisville, among others.

Brents made it back from his junior year injury to start the first game of the 2017 season, his senior year, during which he logged 11 tackles in action against one of Indiana's top-ranked schools. The following week, Brents recorded his first interception of the year in game action against Pike High School of Indianapolis. Brents would finish the season strong, culminating in selection to the 2017 Central Indiana Super Team named by the Indianapolis Star.

== College career ==
=== 2018 season ===
Brents made his way to Iowa City in the summer of 2018 to begin pre-season practice with the Hawkeyes. The true freshman was quick to impress, emerging as the number 3 cornerback on the team's depth chart by the end of August. Brents was listed as the reserve left cornerback and was slated to play as the so-called "nickelback" in five defensive back sets.

Brents was thrust into the limelight in the Hawkeyes' fourth game of the season, a loss to Wisconsin, when starting corner Matt Hankins was forced out of the game with an injury. He made the first start of his career on October 6 against Minnesota, a wild coming-out party in which he contributed his first interception, two pass break-ups, and made three tackles in an exciting 48–31 victory. Brents made a total of five starts as a freshman, gaining accolades before being himself forced from action due to minor "tweak" injuries down the stretch.

=== 2019 season ===
Brents's 2019 sophomore season did not begin auspiciously when a preseason knee injury forced him to miss Iowa's opener and the next three games. He would see only limited play at the safety position in the team's fifth game, a 10–3 loss to Michigan.

The knee injury continue to keep him hobbled, however, and he wound up receiving a red shirt for the season.

One saving grace, Brents later recalled, was that he shared extensive time in rehabilitation with Hawkeyes' defensive coordinator Phil Parker, who was himself recovering from knee surgery. "I gained a lot of knowledge from him, from his viewpoint, how he sees things," Brents noted. "It's helped me to see a lot of things differently, especially on the field." Chiefly among these lessons imparted was the value of film study. "The game really does just slow down when you sit down and study," Brents said. "My freshman year, maybe I was playing more on my athleticism."

=== 2020 season ===
Brents's redshirt sophomore season proved to be a bitter disappointment. Sidelined for almost the whole of the previous year, Brents found it hard to crack Iowa's starting defensive backfield, winding up relegated to special teams and spot reserve work in the defensive backfield, fifth on the cornerback depth chart.

In December 2020, Brents entered the transfer portal, announcing in January 2021 his intention to play for Kansas State University.

Over the course of his career at Iowa, Brents wound up playing in 18 games—five of which he started—recording 17 tackles and one interception.

=== 2021 season ===
Brents arrived at Manhattan, Kansas early in 2021 and made an immediate impression at Kansas State University during spring football practice. K-State defensive coordinator Joe Klanderman was most enthusiastic, proclaiming Brents to have been "outstanding" and calling him "dominant" and an "alpha-male type athlete". "He's learned what we're doing, he's transitioned well into what we're doing", Klanderman declared, adding "he's not a guy that just does it right, but can make the play and finish when he gets the opportunity. He's going to be a good one."

In two years at Kansas State, JuJu Brents started 27 games and recorded 94 tackles and five interceptions. He was named as a first-team All-Big 12 player as a senior in 2022.

== Professional career ==
Pre-draft measurables
Height	Weight	Arm length	Hand span	Wingspan	40-yard dash	10-yard split	20-yard split	20-yard shuttle	Three-cone drill	Vertical jump	Broad jump
6 ft 2 3/4 in (1.90 m)	198 lb (90 kg)	34 in (0.86 m)	9 5/8 in (0.24 m)	6 ft 10 5/8 in (2.10 m)	4.53 s	1.57 s	2.57 s	4.05 s	6.63 s	41.5 in (1.05 m)	11 ft 6 in (3.51 m)
All values from the NFL Combine

=== Indianapolis Colts ===
After trading back with both the Las Vegas Raiders and the Atlanta Falcons to collect two additional late round picks, Indianapolis Colts' general manager Chris Ballard selected Brents in the second round of the 2023 NFL draft, using the 44th overall pick. He recorded his first NFL interception in Week 6 against the Jacksonville Jaguars. He played in nine games with eight starts, recording 43 tackles, one forced fumble, one interception, and six passes defensed.

On September 10, 2024, Brents was placed on injured reserve with a season-ending knee injury.

On August 26, 2025, Brents was waived by the Colts as part of final roster cuts.

=== Miami Dolphins ===
On August 27, 2025, Brents was claimed off waivers by the Miami Dolphins. He made seven appearances (two starts) for Miami, recording one pass deflection, one fumble recovery, and 14 combined tackles. In Week 11 against the Washington Commanders, Brents suffered a foot injury that required season-ending surgery, causing him to be placed on injured reserve on November 19.
