= Ty Zentner =

American football player (born 1998)

Profile
- Position: Punter

Personal information
- Born: July 7, 1998 (age 28); Topeka, Kansas, U.S.
- Listed height: 6 ft 2 in (1.88 m)
- Listed weight: 200 lb (91 kg)

Career information
- High school: Shawnee Heights (Topeka)
- College: Butler CC (2017–2018); Kansas State (2019–2022)
- NFL draft: 2023: undrafted

Career history
- Philadelphia Eagles (2023)*; Houston Texans (2023); Tennessee Titans (2023); Los Angeles Rams (2024); Seattle Seahawks (2024)*
- * Offseason or practice squad member only

Awards and highlights
- Second-team All-Big 12 (2022)

Career NFL statistics as of Week 9, 2024
- Punts: 45
- Punt yards: 1,986
- Punt average: 44.1
- Inside 20: 13
- Longest punt: 64
- Stats at Pro Football Reference

Tyler Zentner (born July 7, 1998) is an American professional football punter. He played college football at Kansas State.

== Early life ==
Zentner grew up in Topeka, Kansas and attended Shawnee Heights High School, where he played, football, soccer, and basketball. He earned honorable mention all-state honors in his senior year in football, he also earned two all-state honors as a goalkeeper in soccer, and in basketball he won the Class 5A state championship his senior year when he was also named to the all-state tournament team. He would commit to play college football at Butler Community College.

== College career ==
Zentner would play two years at Butler Community College. As a freshman in the 2017 season Zentner punted 14 times and was 1-of-3 on field-goal attempts. In the 2018 season Zentner had a punt average of 39.5-yard average on 64 punts including landing 28 inside the opponent's 20-yard line, he was also nine for sixteen on field-goal attempts and 31-of-37 on extra-point attempts, for his performance on the year he earned first team all-conference honors as a punter. After his years at Butler CC, Zentner would commit to Kansas State. Zentner would play for four years at Kansas State. In those years he would have 127 punts for 5,515 yards, with a punt average of 43.4 yards. He also played some kicker going 11 for 12 on field goal attempts, and 37 for 37 on extra point attempts. Zentner's best season would come in 2022 where he would punt 59 times for 2,625 yards, with an average of 44.5 yards per punt, he was also one of the teams kickers going 31 for 31 on extra points and 11 for 11 on field goals. For his performance on the year he was named Second team All-Big 12. He was also one of the ten semifinalists for the Ray Guy Award which is awarded to nations best punter.

== Professional career ==
Pre-draft measurables
Height	Weight	Arm length	Hand span
6 ft 1 5/8 in (1.87 m)	199 lb (90 kg)	30 7/8 in (0.78 m)	9 in (0.23 m)
All values from Pro Day

=== Philadelphia Eagles ===
After not being selected in the 2023 NFL draft, Zentner signed with the Philadelphia Eagles as an undrafted free agent on May 7, 2023. He was released on August 19, 2023.

=== Houston Texans ===
On August 25, 2023, Zentner signed with the Houston Texans. He was waived on August 29, 2023 and re-signed to the practice squad. He was promoted to the active roster on September 13. He was waived on October 2.

=== Tennessee Titans ===
On December 6, 2023, Zentner was signed to the Tennessee Titans practice squad following a season-ending injury to starting punter Ryan Stonehouse. He was signed to the active roster on December 11.

Zentner was waived by the Titans on August 26, 2024.

=== Los Angeles Rams ===
On November 1, 2024, Zentner was signed to the Los Angeles Rams practice squad. He was released from the practice squad on November 19.

=== Seattle Seahawks ===
On December 6, 2024, Zentner signed with the Seattle Seahawks practice squad. He was released by the Seahawks on December 10.
