= Malik Knowles =

American football player (born 2000)

Profile
- Position: Wide receiver

Personal information
- Born: August 17, 2000 (age 26); Lynwood, California, U.S.
- Listed height: 6 ft 2 in (1.88 m)
- Listed weight: 196 lb (89 kg)

Career information
- High school: Lake Ridge (Mansfield, Texas)
- College: Kansas State (2018–2022)
- NFL draft: 2023: undrafted

Career history
- Minnesota Vikings (2023); Green Bay Packers (2024)*; San Francisco 49ers (2025)*; Saskatchewan Roughriders (2026)*
- * Offseason or practice squad member only

Awards and highlights
- First-team All-Big 12 (2021); Second-team All-Big 12 (2022)
- Stats at Pro Football Reference

Malik Knowles (born August 17, 2000) is an American former professional football wide receiver. He played college football for the Kansas State Wildcats.

== Early life ==
Knowles was born in Lynwood, California but grew up in Mansfield, Texas, where he lived with his aunt and uncle, and attended Lake Ridge High School. He had 40 receptions for 846 yards and 15 touchdowns as a senior. Knowles was rated a three-star recruit and committed to play college football at Kansas State.

== College career ==
Knowles caught 10 passes for 100 yards and scored two touchdowns as a true freshman before redshirting the season. He had 27 receptions for 397 yards and three touchdowns and also returned six kickoffs for 222 yards and one touchdown during his redshirt freshman season. Knowles finished his redshirt sophomore season with 13 receptions for 204 yards and three touchdowns, 100 rushing yards and one touchdown on six carries, and 11 kickoffs returned for 203 yards. He caught 29 passes for 441 yards and four touchdowns and was named first team All-Big 12 Conference as a returner after returning 20 kickoffs for 662 yards and two touchdowns. Knowles was named second team All-Big 12 as a receiving after catching 48 passes for 725 yards and two touchdowns and returned 23 kickoffs for 592 yards during his redshirt senior season. After the season, Knowles declared for the 2023 NFL draft.

== Professional career ==
Pre-draft measurables
Height	Weight	Arm length	Hand span
6 ft 2 1/4 in (1.89 m)	196 lb (89 kg)	32 1/4 in (0.82 m)	8 3/4 in (0.22 m)
All values from NFL Combine

=== Minnesota Vikings ===
Knowles was signed by the Minnesota Vikings as an undrafted free agent on April 29, 2023, shortly after the conclusion of the 2023 NFL draft. He was waived with an injury designation from the non-football injury list on July 24. After clearing waivers, he reverted to reserve list, nonetheless, the team placed him on the injured reserve list.

On August 27, 2024, Knowles was waived/injured by the Vikings.

=== Green Bay Packers ===
On October 16, 2024, the Green Bay Packers signed Knowles to their practice squad. He was released on November 30.

=== San Francisco 49ers ===
On June 3, 2025, the San Francisco 49ers signed Knowles to a one-year contract. On July 31, Knowles was waived by 49ers. On August 20, Knowles re-signed with the 49ers, but was waived few days later.

=== Saskatchewan Roughriders ===
Knowles signed with the Saskatchewan Roughriders of the Canadian Football League (CFL) on December 16, 2025.

Knowles announced his retirement from professional football on April 28, 2026.
