= 2022 All-Big 12 Conference football team =

The 2022 All-Big 12 Conference football team consists of American football players chosen as All-Big 12 Conference players for the 2023 Big 12 Conference football season. The conference recognizes two official All-Big 12 selectors: (1) the Big 12 conference coaches selected separate offensive and defensive units and named first- and second-team players (the "Coaches" team); and (2) a panel of sports writers and broadcasters covering the Big 12 also selected offensive and defensive units and named first- and second-team players (the "Media" team).

== Offensive selections ==
=== Quarterbacks ===
- Max Duggan, TCU (Coaches-1; Media-1)
- Jalon Daniels, Kansas (Coaches-2)
- Dillon Gabriel, Oklahoma (Media-2)

=== Running backs ===
- Kendre Miller, TCU (Coaches-1; Media-1)
- Bijan Robinson, Texas (Coaches-1; Media-1)
- Eric Gray, Oklahoma (Coaches-2; Media-2)
- Deuce Vaughn, Kansas State (Coaches-2; Media-2)

=== Fullbacks ===
- Ben Sinnott, Kansas State (Coaches-1)
- Dillon Doyle, Baylor (Coaches-2)
- Jared Rus, Iowa State (Coaches-2)

=== Centers ===
- Alan Ali, TCU (Coaches-1; Media-1)
- Zach Frazier, West Virginia (Coaches-2; Media-2)
- Trevor Downing, Iowa State (Coaches-2)
- Jacob Gall, Baylor (Coaches-2)
- Mike Novitsky, Kansas (Coaches-2)

=== Guards ===
- Steve Avila, TCU (Coaches-1; Media-1)
- Cooper Beebe, Kansas State (Coaches-1; Media-1)

=== Tackles ===
- Anton Harrison, Oklahoma (Coaches-1; Media-1)
- Connor Galvin, Baylor (Coaches-2; Media-1)
- Kelvin Banks Jr., Texas (Coaches-2; Media-2)
- Wanya Morris, Oklahoma (Media-2)

=== Tight ends ===
- Ja'Tavion Sanders, Texas (Coaches-1; Media-1)
- Brayden Willis, Oklahoma (Coaches-2; Media-2)
- Mason Fairchild, Kansas (Coaches-2)

=== Receivers ===
- Xavier Hutchinson, Iowa State (Coaches-1; Media-1)
- Quentin Johnston, TCU (Coaches-1; Media-1)
- Marvin Mims, Oklahoma (Coaches-1; Media-2)
- Xavier Worthy, Texas (Coaches-2; Media-2)
- Bryce Ford-Wheaton, West Virginia (Coaches-2)
- Malik Knowles, Kansas State (Coaches-2)

== Defensive selections ==
=== Defensive linemen ===
- Felix Anudike-Uzomah, Kansas State (Coaches-1; Media-1)
- Siaki Ika, Baylor (Coaches-1; Media-1)
- Dante Stills, West Virginia (Coaches-1; Media-1)
- Tyree Wilson, Texas Tech (Coaches-1; Media-1)
- Will McDonald IV, Iowa State (Coaches-1; Media-2)
- Keondre Coburn, Texas (Coaches-2; Media-2)
- Lonnie Phelps, Kansas (Coaches-2; Media-2)
- Ethan Downs, Oklahoma (Coaches-2)
- Brock Martin, Oklahoma State (Coaches-2)
- Moro Ojomo, Texas (Media-2)
- Collin Oliver, Oklahoma State (Coaches-2)

=== Linebackers ===
- Dee Winters, TCU (Coaches-1; Media-1)
- Jaylan Ford, Texas (Coaches-1; Media-1)
- DeMarvion Overshown, Texas (Coaches-1; Media-1)
- Mason Cobb, Oklahoma State (Coaches-2; Media-2)
- Dillon Doyle, Baylor (Coaches-2; Media-2)
- Johnny Hodges, TCU (Coaches-2; Media-2)

=== Defensive backs ===
- Tre’Vius Hodges-Tomlinson, TCU (Coaches-1; Media-1)
- Josh Newton, TCU (Coaches-1; Media-1)
- Jason Taylor II, Oklahoma State (Coaches-1; Media-1)
- Julius Brents, Kansas State (Coaches-1; Media-2)
- Cobee Bryant, Kansas (Coaches-1; Media-2)
- Marquis Waters, Texas Tech (Media-1)
- Aubrey Burks, West Virginia (Media-2)
- Kendal Daniels, Oklahoma State (Coaches-2)
- Malik Dunlap, Texas Tech (Coaches-2)
- Anthony Johnson Jr., Iowa State (Coaches-2)
- Kobe Savage, Kansas State (Coaches-2)
- T. J. Tampa, Iowa State (Coaches-2)
- Al Walcott, Baylor (Media-2)

== Special teams ==
=== Kickers ===
- Griffin Kell, TCU (Coaches-1; Media-1)
- Tanner Brown, Oklahoma State (Coaches-2; Media-2)

=== Punters ===
- Michael Turk, Oklahoma (Coaches-1; Media-1)
- Ty Zentner, Kansas State (Coaches-2; Media-2)

=== All-purpose / Return specialists ===
- Derius Davis, TCU (Coaches-1; Media-2)
- Deuce Vaughn, Kansas State (Media-1)
- Phillip Brooks, Kansas State (Coaches-2)

== Key ==
Bold = selected as a first-team player by both the coaches and media panel

Coaches = selected by Big 12 Conference coaches

Media = selected by a media panel

== See also ==
- 2022 College Football All-America Team
