= 2022 Big 12 Conference football season =

American college football season

- League: NCAA Division I FBS football season
- Sport: football
- Duration: September 3, 2022; January 2023
- Teams: 10
- TV partner(s): Fox Family (Fox, FS1), ESPN Family (ABC, ESPN, ESPN2, ESPN3, ESPNU, Big 12 Now, LHN)

2023 NFL draft
- Top draft pick: DE Tyree Wilson, Texas Tech
- Picked by: Las Vegas Raiders, 7th overall

Championship Game
- Champions: Kansas State
- Runners-up: TCU
- Finals MVP: Deuce Vaughn, RB

Seasons
- 2021 2023

2022 Big 12 Conference football standings
| | Conf. | | | Overall |
| Team | W | | L | W | | L |
|---|---|---|---|---|---|---|
| No. 2 TCU y^ | 9 | – | 0 | 13 | – | 2 |
| No. 14 Kansas State y$ | 7 | – | 2 | 10 | – | 4 |
| No. 25 Texas | 6 | – | 3 | 8 | – | 5 |
| Texas Tech | 5 | – | 4 | 8 | – | 5 |
| Oklahoma State | 4 | – | 5 | 7 | – | 6 |
| Baylor | 4 | – | 5 | 6 | – | 7 |
| Oklahoma | 3 | – | 6 | 6 | – | 7 |
| Kansas | 3 | – | 6 | 6 | – | 7 |
| West Virginia | 3 | – | 6 | 5 | – | 7 |
| Iowa State | 1 | – | 8 | 4 | – | 8 |
Championship: Kansas State 31, TCU 28 ^{OT}
^ – College Football Playoff participant; $ – Conference champion; y – Championship game participant; Rankings from AP Poll

The 2022 Big 12 Conference football season was the 27th season of the Big 12 Conference football, taking place during the 2022 NCAA Division I FBS football season. The season began on September 3, 2022, with non-conference play. Conference play began on September 24.

The 2022 season was the eleventh season for the Big 12 since the early 2010s conference realignment. It was also the final year in the ten-team configuration that existed prior to the additions of BYU, Cincinnati, Houston and UCF before the 2023 season.

The 2022 Big 12 Championship Game was played at AT&T Stadium in Arlington, Texas, on December 3, 2022. The game featured the TCU Horned Frogs and the Kansas State Wildcats.

== Preseason ==
=== Recruiting classes ===
National Rankings
| Team | ESPN | Rivals | 24/7 | On3 Recruits | Total Signees |
|---|---|---|---|---|---|
| Baylor | 29 | T32 | 37 | 33 | 21 |
| Iowa State | - | 28 | 39 | 36 | 25 |
| Kansas | - | - | 116 | 118 | 11 |
| Kansas State | - | 50 | 63 | 66 | 21 |
| Oklahoma | 15 | 8 | 8 | 8 | 22 |
| Oklahoma State | 36 | 22 | 29 | 27 | 20 |
| TCU | - | 60 | 45 | 39 | 14 |
| Texas | 13 | 5 | 5 | 5 | 28 |
| Texas Tech | - | 39 | 43 | 43 | 18 |
| West Virginia | - | T32 | 35 | 37 | 23 |

=== Big 12 media days ===
The 2022 Big 12 media days were held on July 13–14, 2022 in Frisco, Texas. The teams and representatives in respective order were as follows:

- Big 12 Commissioner – Brett Yormark
- Baylor – Dave Aranda (HC)
- Iowa State – Matt Campbell (HC)
- Kansas – Lance Leipold (HC)
- Kansas State – Chris Klieman (HC)
- Oklahoma – Brent Venables (HC)
- Oklahoma State – Mike Gundy (HC)
- TCU – Sonny Dykes (HC)
- Texas – Steve Sarkisian (HC)
- Texas Tech – Joey McGuire (HC)
- West Virginia – Neal Brown (HC)

=== Preseason poll ===
The preseason poll was released on July 7, 2022.

Big 12
| Predicted finish | Team | Votes (1st place) |
|---|---|---|
| 1 | Baylor (17) | 365 |
| 2 | Oklahoma (12) | 354 |
| 3 | Oklahoma State (9) | 342 |
| 4 | Texas (2) | 289 |
| 5 | Kansas State | 261 |
| 6 | Iowa State (1) | 180 |
| 7 | TCU | 149 |
| 8 | West Virginia | 147 |
| 9 | Texas Tech | 119 |
| 10 | Kansas | 48 |

- First place votes in ()

=== Preseason awards ===
==== All−American Teams ====
| | AP 1st Team | AP 2nd Team | AS 1st Team | AS 2nd Team | WCFF 1st Team | WCFF 2nd Team | ESPN | CBS 1st Team | CBS 2nd Team | CFN 1st Team | CFN 2nd Team | PFF 1st Team | PFF 2nd Team | SN 1st Team | SN 2nd Team |
| Austin McNamara, P, Texas Tech | | | | | | | | | | | | | ✓ | | |
| Bijan Robinson, RB, Texas | ✓ | | ✓ | | ✓ | | ✓ | ✓ | | ✓ | | ✓ | | ✓ | |
| Connor Galvin, OL, Baylor | | ✓ | ✓ | | | | | ✓ | | | | | | | |
| Cooper Beebe, OT, Kansas State | | | | | | | | | | | | | ✓ | | |
| Deuce Vaughn, RB, Kansas State | ✓ | | ✓ | | | | ✓ | ✓ | ✓ | | | ✓ | | | ✓ |
| Felix Anudike-Uzomah, DL, Kansas State | | | | ✓ | | | | | | | | | | | |
| Jaxon Player, DL, Baylor | | | | | ✓ | | | | | | | | ✓ | | |
| Malik Knowles, WR, Kansas State | | | | ✓ | | | | | ✓ | | | | | | ✓ |
| Siaki Ika, DT, Baylor | | | | | | | | | | | ✓ | | | | |
| Will McDonald IV, DL, Iowa State | ✓ | | ✓ | | | | | ✓ | | | ✓ | | | ✓ | |
| Xavier Worthy, WR, Texas | | ✓ | | ✓ | | ✓ | | | | | ✓ | | ✓ | | ✓ |
| Zach Frazier, OL, West Virginia | | | | ✓ | | | | | | | | | | | |

==== Individual awards ====
| Award | Head Coach/Player | School | Position | Year | Ref |
|---|---|---|---|---|---|
| Lott Trophy | Will McDonald IV | Iowa State | DE | (redshirt) Sr. | |
| Lott Trophy | Felix Anudike-Uzomah | Kansas State | DE | Jr. | |
| Lott Trophy | Key Lawrence | Oklahoma | CB | Jr. | |
| Dodd Trophy | Dave Aranda | Baylor | HC | — | |
| Dodd Trophy | Mike Gundy | Oklahoma State | HC | — | |
| Maxwell Award | Xavier Hutchinson | Iowa State | WR | (redshirt) Sr. | |
| Maxwell Award | Deuce Vaughn | Kansas State | RB | Jr. | |
| Maxwell Award | Dillon Gabriel | Oklahoma | QB | (redshirt) Jr. | |
| Maxwell Award | Spencer Sanders | Oklahoma State | QB | (redshirt) Sr. | |
| Maxwell Award | Quentin Johnston | TCU | WR | Jr. | |
| Maxwell Award | Bijan Robinson | Texas | RB | Jr. | |
| Maxwell Award | Xavier Worthy | Texas | WR | So. | |
| Maxwell Award | JT Daniels | West Virginia | QB | Jr. | |
| Davey O'Brien Award | Dillon Gabriel | Oklahoma | QB | (redshirt) Jr. | |
| Davey O'Brien Award | Spencer Sanders | Oklahoma State | QB | (redshirt) Sr. | |
| Doak Walker Award | Devin Neal | Kansas | RB | So. | |
| Doak Walker Award | Deuce Vaughn | Kansas State | RB | Jr. | |
| Doak Walker Award | Eric Gray | Oklahoma | RB | Sr. | |
| Doak Walker Award | Dominic Richardson | Oklahoma State | RB | Jr. | |
| Doak Walker Award | Kendre Miller | TCU | RB | Jr. | |
| Doak Walker Award | Roschon Johnson | Texas | RB | Sr. | |
| Doak Walker Award | Bijan Robinson | Texas | RB | Jr. | |
| Biletnikoff Award | Xavier Hutchinson | Iowa State | WR | (redshirt) Sr. | |
| Biletnikoff Award | Marvin Mims | Oklahoma | WR | Jr. | |
| Biletnikoff Award | Quentin Johnston | TCU | WR | Jr. | |
| Biletnikoff Award | Isaiah Neyor | Texas | WR | Jr. | |
| Biletnikoff Award | Xavier Worthy | Texas | WR | So. | |

| Award | Head Coach/Player | School | Position | Year | Ref |
|---|---|---|---|---|---|
| John Mackey Award | Ben Sims | Baylor | TE | Sr. | |
| John Mackey Award | Brayden Willis | Oklahoma | TE | Sr. | |
| John Mackey Award | Ja'Tavion Sanders | Texas | TE | So. | |
| John Mackey Award | Baylor Cupp | Texas Tech | TE | Jr. | |
| John Mackey Award | Mike O'Laughlin | West Virginia | TE | (redshirt) Jr. | |
| Rimington Trophy | Jacob Gall | Baylor | C | (redshirt) Graduate | |
| Rimington Trophy | Trevor Downing | Iowa State | C | (redshirt) Sr. | |
| Rimington Trophy | Mike Novitsky | Kansas | C | (redshirt) Sr. | |
| Rimington Trophy | Preston Wilson | Oklahoma State | C | (redshirt) Jr. | |
| Rimington Trophy | Steve Avila | TCU | C | Sr. | |
| Rimington Trophy | Zach Frazier | West Virginia | C | So. | |
| Butkus Award | David Ugwoegbu | Oklahoma | LB | Sr. | |
| Butkus Award | Dee Winters | TCU | LB | Sr. | |
| Butkus Award | DeMarvion Overshown | Texas | LB | Sr. | |
| Jim Thorpe Award | Kenny Logan Jr. | Kansas | S | Sr. | |
| Jim Thorpe Award | JuJu Brents | Kansas State | CB | Sr. | |
| Jim Thorpe Award | Tre Tomlinson | TCU | CB | Sr. | |
| Bronko Nagurski Trophy | Dillon Doyle | Baylor | LB | Sr. | |
| Bronko Nagurski Trophy | Siaki Ika | Baylor | DT | Jr. | |
| Bronko Nagurski Trophy | Will McDonald IV | Iowa State | DE | (redshirt) Sr. | |
| Bronko Nagurski Trophy | Felix Anudike-Uzomah | Kansas State | DE | Jr. | |
| Bronko Nagurski Trophy | Brock Martin | Oklahoma State | DE | (redshirt) Sr. | |
| Bronko Nagurski Trophy | Collin Oliver | Oklahoma State | DE | So. | |
| Bronko Nagurski Trophy | Tre Tomlinson | TCU | CB | Sr. | |
| Bronko Nagurski Trophy | DeMarvion Overshown | Texas | LB | Sr. | |
| Bronko Nagurski Trophy | Dante Stills | West Virginia | DT | Sr. | |
| Bronko Nagurski Trophy | Charles Woods | West Virginia | CB | Sr. | |
| Outland Trophy | Jacob Gall | Baylor | C | (redshirt) Graduate | |
| Outland Trophy | Connor Galvin | Baylor | OT | Sr. | |
| Outland Trophy | Siaki Ika | Baylor | DT | Jr. | |
| Outland Trophy | Trevor Downing | Iowa State | C | (redshirt) Sr. | |
| Outland Trophy | Cooper Beebe | Kansas State | OT | Jr. | |
| Outland Trophy | Anton Harrison | Oklahoma | OT | Jr. | |
| Outland Trophy | Hunter Woodard | Oklahoma State | OG | (redshirt) Sr. | |
| Outland Trophy | Steve Avila | TCU | C | Sr. | |
| Outland Trophy | Cole Spencer | Texas Tech | OT | Sr. | |
| Outland Trophy | Dante Stills | West Virginia | DT | Sr. | |

| Award | Head Coach/Player | School | Position | Year | Ref |
|---|---|---|---|---|---|
| Lou Groza Award | Casey Legg | West Virginia | PK | (redshirt) Sr. | |
| Ray Guy Award | Issac Power | Baylor | P | Sr. | |
| Ray Guy Award | Ty Zentner | Kansas State | P | Sr. | |
| Ray Guy Award | Michael Turk | Oklahoma | P | (redshirt) Sr. | |
| Ray Guy Award | Tom Hutton | Oklahoma State | P | Sr. | |
| Ray Guy Award | Jordy Sandy | TCU | P | Sr. | |
| Ray Guy Award | Austin McNamara | Texas Tech | P | Sr. | |
| Paul Hornung Award | Kenny Logan Jr. | Kansas | S | Sr. | |
| Paul Hornung Award | Malik Knowles | Kansas State | WR | Sr. | |
| Paul Hornung Award | Marvin Mims | Oklahoma | WR | Jr. | |
| Paul Hornung Award | Brennan Presley | Oklahoma State | WR | Jr. | |
| Paul Hornung Award | Derius Davis | TCU | WR | Sr. | |
| Paul Hornung Award | D'Shawn Jamison | Texas | DB | Sr. | |
| Paul Hornung Award | Myles Price | Texas Tech | WR | Jr. | |
| Wuerffel Trophy | Ben Sims | Baylor | TE | Sr. | |
| Wuerffel Trophy | Anthony Johnson Jr. | Iowa State | DB | (redshirt) Sr. | |
| Wuerffel Trophy | Sam Burt | Kansas | DL | Sr. | |
| Wuerffel Trophy | Will Howard | Kansas State | QB | Jr. | |
| Wuerffel Trophy | Marvin Mims | Oklahoma | WR | Jr. | |
| Wuerffel Trophy | Brendon Evers | Oklahoma State | DT | (redshirt) Sr. | |
| Wuerffel Trophy | Andrew Coker | TCU | OT | Jr. | |
| Wuerffel Trophy | Bijan Robinson | Texas | RB | Jr. | |
| Wuerffel Trophy | Tony Bradford Jr. | Texas Tech | DL | Sr. | |
| Wuerffel Trophy | Zach Frazier | West Virginia | OL | So. | |
| Walter Camp Award | Xavier Hutchinson | Iowa State | WR | (redshirt) Sr. | |
| Walter Camp Award | Will McDonald IV | Iowa State | DE | Jr. | |
| Walter Camp Award | Deuce Vaughn | Kansas State | RB | Jr. | |
| Walter Camp Award | Dillon Gabriel | Oklahoma | QB | (redshirt) Jr. | |
| Walter Camp Award | Spencer Sanders | Oklahoma State | QB | (redshirt) Sr. | |
| Walter Camp Award | Quentin Johnston | TCU | WR | Jr. | |
| Walter Camp Award | Bijan Robinson | Texas | RB | Jr. | |
| Walter Camp Award | Xavier Worthy | Texas | WR | So. | |
| Walter Camp Award | JT Daniels | West Virginia | QB | Jr. | |
| Bednarik Award | Siaki Ika | Baylor | DT | Jr. | |
| Bednarik Award | Will McDonald IV | Iowa State | DE | (redshirt) Sr. | |
| Bednarik Award | Kenny Logan Jr. | Kansas | S | Sr. | |
| Bednarik Award | Felix Anudike-Uzomah | Kansas State | DE | Jr. | |
| Bednarik Award | Jalen Redmond | Oklahoma | DT | (redshirt) Jr. | |
| Bednarik Award | Collin Oliver | Oklahoma State | DE | So. | |
| Bednarik Award | Tre Tomlinson | TCU | CB | Sr. | |
| Bednarik Award | DeMarvion Overshown | Texas | LB | Sr. | |
| Bednarik Award | Tyree Wilson | Texas Tech | LB | Sr. | |
| Bednarik Award | Dante Stills | West Virginia | DT | Sr. | |
| Rotary Lombardi Award | Connor Galvin | Baylor | OT | Sr. | |
| Rotary Lombardi Award | Trevor Downing | Iowa State | C | (redshirt) Sr. | |
| Rotary Lombardi Award | Will McDonald IV | Iowa State | DE | (redshirt) Sr. | |
| Rotary Lombardi Award | Cooper Beebe | Kansas State | OL | Jr. | |
| Rotary Lombardi Award | Felix Anudike-Uzomah | Kansas State | DE | Jr. | |
| Rotary Lombardi Award | Chris Murray | Oklahoma | OG | (redshirt) Sr. | |
| Rotary Lombardi Award | Brock Martin | Oklahoma State | DE | (redshirt) Sr. | |
| Rotary Lombardi Award | DeMarvion Overshown | Texas | LB | (redshirt) Graduate | |
| Rotary Lombardi Award | Dante Stills | West Virginia | DL | Sr. | |
| Rotary Lombardi Award | Wyatt Milum | West Virginia | OL | So. | |
| Rotary Lombardi Award | Zach Frazier | West Virginia | OL | So. | |
| Patrick Mannelly Award | Randen Plattner | Kansas State | LS | (redshirt) Sr. | |
| Patrick Mannelly Award | Kasey Kelleher | Oklahoma | LS | (redshirt) Graduate | |
| Patrick Mannelly Award | Matt Hembrough | Oklahoma State | LS | (redshirt) Sr. | |
| Earl Campbell Tyler Rose Award | Blake Shapen | Baylor | QB | Junior | |
| Earl Campbell Tyler Rose Award | Xavier Hutchinson | Iowa State | WR | (redshirt) Sr. | |
| Earl Campbell Tyler Rose Award | Deuce Vaughn | Kansas State | RB | Junior | |
| Earl Campbell Tyler Rose Award | Marvin Mims | Oklahoma | WR | Junior | |
| Earl Campbell Tyler Rose Award | Theo Wease | Oklahoma | WR | Junior | |
| Earl Campbell Tyler Rose Award | Spencer Sanders | Oklahoma State | QB | (redshirt) Sr. | |
| Earl Campbell Tyler Rose Award | Taye Barber | TCU | WR | (redshirt) Graduate | |
| Earl Campbell Tyler Rose Award | Quentin Johnston | TCU | WR | Jr. | |
| Earl Campbell Tyler Rose Award | Kendre Miller | TCU | RB | Jr. | |
| Earl Campbell Tyler Rose Award | Bijan Robinson | Texas | RB | Jr. | |
| Earl Campbell Tyler Rose Award | Tahj Brooks | Texas Tech | RB | Jr. | |
| Earl Campbell Tyler Rose Award | Myles Price | Texas Tech | WR | Jr. | |
| Earl Campbell Tyler Rose Award | SaRodorick Thompson | Texas Tech | RB | Sr. | |
| Earl Campbell Tyler Rose Award | Brian Polendey | West Virginia | TE | Sr. | |
| Polynesian College Football Player Of The Year Award | Siaki Ika | Baylor | DT | Jr. | |
| Polynesian College Football Player Of The Year Award | Jonah Laulu | Oklahoma | DT | Sr. | |
| Polynesian College Football Player Of The Year Award | Sione Asi | Oklahoma State | DT | RS Sr. | |
| Manning Award | Spencer Sanders | Oklahoma State | QB | Sr. | |
| Johnny Unitas Golden Arm Award | Adrian Martinez | Kansas State | QB | Sr. | |
| Johnny Unitas Golden Arm Award | Dillon Gabriel | Oklahoma | QB | (redshirt) Jr. | |
| Johnny Unitas Golden Arm Award | Spencer Sanders | Oklahoma State | QB | (redshirt) Sr. | |
| Johnny Unitas Golden Arm Award | Max Duggan | TCU | QB | Sr. | |
| Johnny Unitas Golden Arm Award | Hudson Card | Texas | QB | So. | |
| Johnny Unitas Golden Arm Award | Tyler Shough | Texas Tech | QB | Sr. | |
| Johnny Unitas Golden Arm Award | JT Daniels | West Virginia | QB | Jr. | |
| Ted Hendricks Award | | | | | |

==== Preseason All-Big 12 teams ====
2022 Preseason All-Big 12

- Offensive Player of the Year: Bijan Robinson, RB, Texas, Jr.
- Defensive Player of the Year: Felix Anudike-Uzomah, DE, Kansas State, Jr.
- Newcomer of the Year: Dillon Gabriel, QB, Oklahoma, GS

All-Big 12 Offense
| Position | Player | Class | Team |
|---|---|---|---|
| QB | Spencer Sanders | RS Senior | Oklahoma State |
| RB | Deuce Vaughn | Junior | Kansas State |
| RB | Bijan Robinson | Junior | Texas |
| FB | Jared Rus | RS Senior | Iowa State |
| WR | Xavier Hutchinson | RS Senior | Iowa State |
| WR | Quentin Johnston | Junior | TCU |
| WR | Xavier Worthy | Sophomore | Texas |
| TE | Ben Sims | Senior | Baylor |
| OL | Connor Galvin | RS Senior | Baylor |
| OL | Jacob Gall | RS Senior | Baylor |
| OL | Trevor Downing | RS Senior | Iowa State |
| OL | Cooper Beebe | Junior | Kansas State |
| OL | Zach Frazier | Sophomore | West Virginia |
| PK | Casey Legg | RS Senior | West Virginia |
| KR/PR | Malik Knowles | Senior | Kansas State |

All-Big 12 Defense
| Position | Player | Class | Team |
|---|---|---|---|
| DL | Siaki Ika | Junior | Baylor |
| DL | Will McDonald IV | RS Senior | Iowa State |
| DL | Felix Anudike-Uzomah | Junior | Kansas State |
| DL | Collin Oliver | Sophomore | Oklahoma State |
| DL | Dante Stills | Senior | West Virginia |
| LB | Dillon Doyle | Senior | Baylor |
| LB | Daniel Green | Senior | Kansas State |
| LB | DeMarvion Overshown | Senior | Texas |
| DB | Kenny Logan Jr. | Senior | Kansas |
| DB | JuJu Brents | Senior | Kansas State |
| DB | Jason Taylor II | RS Senior | Oklahoma State |
| DB | Tre Tomlinson | Senior | TCU |
| DB | Charles Woods | Senior | West Virginia |
| P | Michael Turk | GS | Oklahoma |

== Head coaches ==
| Team | Head coach | Years at school | Overall record | Record at school | Big–12 record |
|---|---|---|---|---|---|
| Baylor | Dave Aranda | 3 | 20-15 | 20-15 | 13-14 |
| Iowa State | Matt Campbell | 6 | 81-57 | 46-42 | 32-31 |
| Kansas | Lance Leipold | 2 | 154-55 | 8–16 | 4–14 |
| Kansas State | Chris Klieman | 4 | 101-32 | 29-19 | 20-16 |
| Oklahoma | Brent Venables | 1 | 6-6 | 6-6 | 3-6 |
| Oklahoma State | Mike Gundy | 18 | 156–74 | 156–74 | 95–61 |
| TCU | Sonny Dykes | 1 | 83–63 | 12–0 | 9–0 |
| Texas | Steve Sarkisian | 2 | 59–46 | 13–11 | 9–9 |
| Texas Tech | Joey McGuire | 1 | 7-5 | 7-5 | 5-4 |
| West Virginia | Neal Brown | 4 | 57–41 | 22–25 | 14–21 |

== Schedule ==
Index to colors and formatting
Big 12 member won
Big 12 member lost
Big 12 teams in **bold**

All times Central time.

† denotes Homecoming game

=== Regular season schedule ===
==== Week One ====
| Date | Time | Visiting team | Home team | Site | TV | Result | Attendance | Ref. |
|---|---|---|---|---|---|---|---|---|
| September 1 | 6:00 p.m. | **West Virginia** | No. 17 Pittsburgh | Acrisure Stadium • Pittsburgh, PA (Backyard Brawl) | ESPN | **L** 31–38 | 70,622 | |
| September 1 | 6:00 p.m. | Central Michigan | No. 12 **Oklahoma State** | Boone Pickens Stadium • Stillwater, OK | FS1 | **W** 58–44 | 53,808 | |
| September 2 | 7:00 p.m. | Tennessee Tech | **Kansas** | David Booth Kansas Memorial Stadium • Lawrence, KS | ESPN+ | **W** 56–10 | 34,902 | |
| September 2 | 9:00 p.m. | **TCU** | Colorado | Folsom Field • Boulder, CO | ESPN | **W** 38–13 | 47,868 | |
| September 3 | 1:00 p.m. | Southeast Missouri State | **Iowa State** | Jack Trice Stadium • Ames, IA | ESPN+ | **W** 42–10 | 57,142 | |
| September 3 | 2:30 p.m. | UTEP | No. 9 **Oklahoma** | Gaylord Family Oklahoma Memorial Stadium • Norman, OK | FOX | **W** 45–13 | 83,173 | |
| September 3 | 6:00 p.m. | Albany | No. 10 **Baylor** | McLane Stadium • Waco, TX | ESPN+ | **W** 69–10 | 41,242 | |
| September 3 | 6:00 p.m. | South Dakota | **Kansas State** | Bill Snyder Family Football Stadium • Manhattan, KS | ESPN+ | **W** 34–0 | 50,469 | |
| September 3 | 7:00 p.m. | Louisiana-Monroe | **Texas** | Darrell K Royal–Texas Memorial Stadium • Austin, TX | LHN | **W** 52–10 | 94,873 | |
| September 3 | 7:00 p.m. | Murray State | **Texas Tech** | Jones AT&T Stadium • Lubbock, TX | ESPN+ | **W** 63–10 | 60,201 | |
^{#}Rankings from AP Poll released prior to game. All times are in Central Time.

==== Week Two ====
| Date | Time | Visiting team | Home team | Site | TV | Result | Attendance | Ref. |
|---|---|---|---|---|---|---|---|---|
| September 10 | 11:00 a.m. | No. 1 Alabama | **Texas** | Darrell K Royal–Texas Memorial Stadium • Austin, TX | FOX | **L** 19–20 | 105,213 | |
| September 10 | 11:00 a.m. | Missouri | **Kansas State** | Bill Snyder Family Football Stadium • Manhattan, KS | ESPN2 | **W** 40–12 | 51,806 | |
| September 10 | 3:00 p.m. | No. 25 Houston | **Texas Tech** | Jones AT&T Stadium • Lubbock, TX | FS1 | **W** 33–30 ^{2OT} | 56,271 | |
| September 10 | 3:00 p.m. | **Iowa State** | Iowa | Kinnick Stadium • Iowa City, IA (Cy-Hawk Series) | BTN | **W** 10–7 | 69,250 | |
| September 10 | 5:00 p.m. | **Kansas** | **West Virginia** | Milan Puskar Stadium • Morgantown, WV | ESPN+ | **KU** 55–42 ^{OT} | 52,188 | |
| September 10 | 6:00 p.m. | Kent State | No. 7 **Oklahoma** | Gaylord Family Oklahoma Memorial Stadium • Norman, OK | ESPN+ | **W** 33–3 | 83,911 | |
| September 10 | 6:30 p.m. | Arizona State | No. 11 **Oklahoma State** | Boone Pickens Stadium • Stillwater, OK | ESPN2 | **W** 34–17 | 54,949 | |
| September 10 | 7:00 p.m. | Tarleton State | **TCU** | Amon G. Carter Stadium • Fort Worth, TX | ESPN+ | **W** 59–17 | 43,197 | |
| September 10 | 9:15 p.m. | No. 9 **Baylor** | No. 21 BYU | LaVell Edwards Stadium • Provo, UT | ESPN | **L** 20–26 ^{2OT} | 63,470 | |
^{#}Rankings from AP Poll released prior to game. All times are in Central Time.

==== Week Three ====
| Date | Time | Visiting team | Home team | Site | TV | Result | Attendance | Ref. |
|---|---|---|---|---|---|---|---|---|
| September 17 | 11:00 a.m. | No. 6 **Oklahoma** | Nebraska | Memorial Stadium • Lincoln, NE (Nebraska–Oklahoma football rivalry) | FOX | **W** 49–14 | 87,161 | |
| September 17 | 11:00 a.m. | Texas State | No. 17 **Baylor** | McLane Stadium • Waco, TX | FS1 | **W** 42–7 | 45,597 | |
| September 17 | 12:00 p.m. | Towson | **West Virginia** | Mountaineer Field • Morgantown, WV | ESPN+ | **W** 65–7 | 50,703 | |
| September 17 | 1:00 p.m. | Ohio | **Iowa State** | Jack Trice Stadium • Ames, IA | ESPN+ | **W** 43–10 | 58,138 | |
| September 17 | 2:00 p.m. | Tulane | **Kansas State** | Bill Snyder Family Football Stadium • Manhattan, KS | ESPN+ | **L** 10–17 | 50,887 | |
| September 17 | 3:00 p.m. | **Kansas** | Houston | TDECU Stadium • Houston, TX | ESPNU | **W** 48–30 | 30,317 | |
| September 17 | 6:00 p.m. | Arkansas-Pine Bluff | No. 8 **Oklahoma State** | Boone Pickens Stadium • Stillwater, OK | ESPN+ | **W** 63–7 | 55,509 | |
| September 17 | 6:00 p.m. | **Texas Tech** | No. 16 NC State | Carter–Finley Stadium • Raleigh, NC | ESPN2 | **L** 14–27 | 56,919 | |
| September 17 | 7:00 p.m. | UTSA | No. 21 **Texas** | Darrell K Royal–Texas Memorial Stadium • Austin, TX | LHN | **W** 41–20 | 102,520 | |
^{#}Rankings from AP Poll released prior to game. All times are in Central Time.

==== Week Four ====
| Date | Time | Visiting team | Home team | Site | TV | Result | Attendance | Ref. |
|---|---|---|---|---|---|---|---|---|
| September 22 | 6:30 p.m. | **West Virginia** | Virginia Tech | Lane Stadium • Blacksburg, VA (Rivalry) | ESPN | **W** 33–10 | 65,632 | |
| September 24 | 2:30 p.m. | No. 22 **Texas** | **Texas Tech** | Jones AT&T Stadium • Lubbock, TX (rivalry) | ESPN | **TTU** 37–34 ^{OT} | 60,975 | |
| September 24 | 11:00 a.m. | **TCU** | SMU | Gerald J. Ford Stadium • University Park, TX (rivalry) | ESPNU | **W** 42–34 | 35,569 | |
| September 24 | 11:00 a.m. | No. 17 **Baylor** | **Iowa State** | Jack Trice Stadium • Ames, IA | ESPN2 | **BU** 31–24 | 58,069 | |
| September 24 | 11:00 a.m. | Duke | **Kansas** | David Booth Kansas Memorial Stadium • Lawrence, KS | FS1 | **W** 35–27 | 47,233 | |
| September 24 | 7:00 p.m. | **Kansas State** | No. 6 **Oklahoma** | Gaylord Family Oklahoma Stadium • Norman, OK | FOX | **KSU** 41–34 | 84,376 | |
^{#}Rankings from AP Poll released prior to game. All times are in Central Time.

==== Week Five ====
| Date | Time | Visiting team | Home team | Site | TV | Result | Attendance | Ref. |
|---|---|---|---|---|---|---|---|---|
| October 1 | 11:00 a.m. | No. 18 **Oklahoma** | **TCU** | Amon G. Carter Stadium • Fort Worth, TX | ABC | **TCU** 55–24 | 49,095 | |
| October 1 | 11:00 a.m. | **Texas Tech** | No. 25 **Kansas State** | Bill Snyder Family Football Stadium • Manhattan, KS | ESPN+ | **KSU** 37–34 | 50,782 | |
| October 1 | 6:30 p.m. | **West Virginia** | **Texas** | Darrell K Royal–Texas Memorial Stadium • Austin, TX | FS1 | **TEX** 38–20 | 100,740 | |
| October 1 | 2:30 p.m. | No. 9 **Oklahoma State** | No. 16 **Baylor** | McLane Stadium • Waco, TX | FOX | **OSU** 36–25 | 47,979 | |
| October 1 | 2:30 p.m. | **Iowa State** | **Kansas** | David Booth Kansas Memorial Stadium • Lawrence, KS | ESPN2 | **KU** 14–11 | 47,233 | |
^{#}Rankings from AP Poll released prior to game. All times are in Central Time.

==== Week Six ====
| Date | Time | Visiting team | Home team | Site | TV | Result | Attendance | Ref. |
|---|---|---|---|---|---|---|---|---|
| October 8 | 11:00 a.m. | **Oklahoma** | **Texas** | Cotton Bowl • Dallas, TX (rivalry) | ABC | **TEX** 49–0 | 92,100 | |
| October 8 | 11:00 a.m. | No. 17 **TCU** | No. 19 **Kansas** | David Booth Kansas Memorial Stadium • Lawrence, KS | FS1 | **TCU** 38–31 | 47,233 | |
| October 8 | 6:30 p.m. | No. 20 **Kansas State** | **Iowa State** | Jack Trice Stadium • Ames, IA (Farmageddon) | ESPNU | **KSU** 10–9 | 60,561 | |
| October 8 | 2:30 p.m. | **Texas Tech** | No. 7 **Oklahoma State** | Boone Pickens Stadium • Stillwater, OK | FS1 | **OSU** 41–31 | 55,509 | |
^{#}Rankings from AP Poll released prior to game. All times are in Central Time.

==== Week Seven ====
| Date | Time | Visiting team | Home team | Site | TV | Result | Attendance | Ref. |
|---|---|---|---|---|---|---|---|---|
| October 13 | 6:00 p.m. | **Baylor** | **West Virginia** | Mountaineer Field • Morgantown, WV | FS1 | **WVU** 43–40 | 45,293 | |
| October 15 | 11:00 a.m. | No. 19 **Kansas** | **Oklahoma** | Gaylord Family Oklahoma Stadium • Norman, OK | ESPN2 | **OKLA** 52–42 | 83,874 | |
| October 15 | 2:30 p.m. | No. 8 **Oklahoma State** | No. 13 **TCU** | Amon G. Carter Stadium • Fort Worth, TX | ABC | **TCU** 43–40 ^{2OT} | 49,594 | |
| October 15 | 11:00 a.m. | **Iowa State** | No. 22т **Texas** | Darrell K. Royal Memorial Stadium • Austin, TX | ABC | **TEX** 24–21 | 100,072 | |
^{#}Rankings from AP Poll released prior to game. All times are in Central Time.

==== Week Eight ====
| Date | Time | Visiting team | Home team | Site | TV | Result | Attendance | Ref. |
|---|---|---|---|---|---|---|---|---|
| October 22 | 11:00 a.m. | **Kansas** | **Baylor** | McLane Stadium • Waco, TX | ESPN2 | **BU** 35-23 | 45,882 | |
| October 22 | 7:00 p.m. | No. 17 **Kansas State** | No. 8 **TCU** | Amon G. Carter Stadium • Fort Worth, TX | FS1 | **TCU** 38-28 | 47,881 | |
| October 22 | 2:30 p.m. | No. 20 **Texas** | No. 11 **Oklahoma State** | Boone Pickens Stadium • Stillwater, OK | ABC | **OSU** 41-34 | 55,509 | |
| October 22 | 2:00 p.m. | **West Virginia** | **Texas Tech** | Jones AT&T Stadium • Lubbock, TX | FS1 | **TTU** 48-10 | 56,530 | |
^{#}Rankings from AP Poll released prior to game. All times are in Central Time.

==== Week Nine ====
| Date | Time | Visiting team | Home team | Site | TV | Result | Attendance | Ref. |
|---|---|---|---|---|---|---|---|---|
| October 29 | 11:00 a.m. | **Oklahoma** | **Iowa State** | Jack Trice Stadium • Ames, IA | FS1 | **OU 27-13** | 58,716 | |
| October 29 | 11:00 a.m. | No. 7 **TCU** | **West Virginia** | Mountaineer Field • Morgantown, WV | ESPN | **TCU 41-31** | 50,426 | |
| October 29 | 6:30 p.m. | **Baylor** | **Texas Tech** | Jones AT&T Stadium • Lubbock, TX | ESPN2 | **BU 45-17** | 60,705 | |
| October 29 | 2:30 p.m. | No. 9 **Oklahoma State** | No. 22 **Kansas State** | Bill Snyder Family Football Stadium • Manhattan, KS | FOX | **KSU** 48-0 | 51,133 | |
^{#}Rankings from AP Poll released prior to game. All times are in Central Time.

==== Week Ten ====
| Date | Time | Visiting team | Home team | Site | TV | Result | Attendance | Ref. |
|---|---|---|---|---|---|---|---|---|
| November 5 | 2:30 p.m. | No. 18 **Oklahoma State** | **Kansas** | David Booth Kansas Memorial Stadium • Lawrence, KS | FS1 | **KU 37-16** | 43,606 | |
| November 5 | 2:30 p.m. | **West Virginia** | **Iowa State** | Jack Trice Stadium • Ames, IA | ESPN+ | **ISU 31-14** | 56,109 | |
| November 5 | 2:00 p.m. | **Baylor** | **Oklahoma** | Gaylord Family Oklahoma Stadium • Norman, OK | ESPN+ | **BU 38-35** | 83,546 | |
| November 5 | 6:00 p.m. | No. 24 **Texas** | No. 13 **Kansas State** | Bill Snyder Family Football Stadium • Manhattan, KS | FS1 | **UT 34-27** | 51,216 | |
| November 5 | 11:00 a.m. | **Texas Tech** | No. 7 **TCU** | Amon G. Carter Stadium • Fort Worth, TX (rivalry) | FOX | **TCU 34-24** | 44,760 | |
^{#}Rankings from College Football Playoff. All times are in Central Time.

==== Week Eleven ====
| Date | Time | Visiting team | Home team | Site | TV | Result | Attendance | Ref. |
|---|---|---|---|---|---|---|---|---|
| November 12 | 6:00 p.m. | No. 19 **Kansas State** | **Baylor** | McLane Stadium • Waco, TX | FS1 | **KSU 31-3** | 47,686 | |
| November 12 | 2:30 p.m. | **Iowa State** | **Oklahoma State** | Boone Pickens Stadium • Stillwater, OK | ESPNU | **OSU 20-14** | 55,509 | |
| November 12 | 6:00 p.m. | **Kansas** | **Texas Tech** | Jones AT&T Stadium • Lubbock, TX | ESPN+ | **TTU 43-28** | 55,613 | |
| November 12 | 11:00 a.m. | **Oklahoma** | **West Virginia** | Mountaineer Field • Morgantown, WV | FS1 | **WVU 23-20** | 50,281 | |
| November 12 | 6:30 p.m. | No. 4 **TCU** | No. 18 **Texas** | Darrell K Royal–Texas Memorial Stadium • Austin, TX (rivalry) | ABC | **TCU 17-10** | 104,203 | |
^{#}Rankings from College Football Playoff. All times are in Central Time.

==== Week Twelve ====
| Date | Time | Visiting team | Home team | Site | TV | Result | Attendance | Ref. |
|---|---|---|---|---|---|---|---|---|
| November 19 | 1:00 p.m. | No. 19 **Kansas State** | **West Virginia** | Milan Puskar Stadium • Morgantown, WV | ESPN+ | **KSU 48-31** | 37,055 | |
| November 19 | 6:00 p.m. | **Texas Tech** | **Iowa State** | Jack Trice Stadium • Ames, IA | FS1 | **TTU 14-10** | 52,676 | |
| November 19 | 2:30 p.m. | No. 18 **Texas** | **Kansas** | David Booth Kansas Memorial Stadium • Lawrence, KS | FS1 | **UT 55-14** | 38,246 | |
| November 19 | 11:00 a.m. | No. 4 **TCU** | **Baylor** | McLane Stadium • Waco, TX (rivalry) | FOX | **TCU 29-28** | 44,393 | |
| November 19 | 6:30 p.m. | **Oklahoma State** | **Oklahoma** | Gaylord Family Oklahoma Stadium • Norman, OK (rivalry) | ABC | **OU 28-13** | 86,112 | |
^{#}Rankings from College Football Playoff. All times are in Central Time.

==== Week Thirteen ====
| Date | Time | Visiting team | Home team | Site | TV | Result | Attendance | Ref. |
|---|---|---|---|---|---|---|---|---|
| November 25 | 11:00 a.m. | **Baylor** | No. 23 **Texas** | Darrell K. Royal Memorial Stadium • Austin, TX | ESPN | **UT** 38-27 | 94,076 | |
| November 26 | 3:00 p.m. | **Iowa State** | No. 4 **TCU** | Amon G. Carter Stadium • Fort Worth, TX | FOX | **TCU**62-14 | 44,846 | |
| November 26 | 7:00 p.m. | **Kansas** | No. 12 **Kansas State** | Bill Snyder Family Football Stadium • Manhattan, KS (rivalry) | FOX | **KSU** 47-27 | 51,861 | |
| November 26 | 6:30 p.m. | **Oklahoma** | **Texas Tech** | Jones AT&T Stadium • Lubbock, TX | FS1 | **TTU** 51-48 ^{OT} | 51,126 | |
| November 26 | 11:00 a.m. | **West Virginia** | **Oklahoma State** | Boone Pickens Stadium • Stillwater, OK | ESPN2 | **WVU** 24-19 | 52,353 | |
^{#}Rankings from College Football Playoff. All times are in Central Time.

==== Championship Game ====
| Date | Time | Visiting team | Home team | Site | TV | Result | Attendance | Ref. |
|---|---|---|---|---|---|---|---|---|
| December 3 | 11:00 a.m. | No. 10 **Kansas State** | No. 3 TCU | AT&T Stadium • Arlington, Texas | ABC | **KSU** 31–28^{OT} | 69,335 | |
^{#}Rankings from College Football Playoff. All times are in Central Time.

== Postseason ==
=== Bowl games ===
Legend
| Big 12 win |
| Big 12 loss |

For the 2020–2025 bowl cycle, The Big-12 will have annually eight appearances in the following bowls: Sugar Bowl (unless they are selected for playoffs filled by a Big-12 team if champion is in the playoffs), First Responder Bowl, Liberty Bowl, Alamo Bowl, Guaranteed Rate Bowl, Cheez-It Bowl and Texas Bowl. The Big-12 teams will go to a New Year's Six bowl if a team finishes higher than the champions of Power Five conferences in the final College Football Playoff rankings. The Big-12 champion are also eligible for the College Football Playoff if they're among the top four teams in the final CFP ranking.

| Bowl game | Date | Site | Time (CST) | Television | Big 12 team | Opponent | Score | Attendance |
|---|---|---|---|---|---|---|---|---|
| Armed Forces Bowl | December 22, 2022 | Amon G. Carter Stadium • Fort Worth, Texas | 6:30 p.m. | ESPN | Baylor | Air Force | **L** 30–15 | |
| Guaranteed Rate Bowl | December 27, 2022 | Chase Field • Phoenix, Arizona | 9:15 p.m. | ESPN | Oklahoma State | Wisconsin | **L** 24–17 | 23,187 |
| Liberty Bowl | December 28, 2022 | Liberty Bowl • Memphis, TN | 4:30 p.m. | ESPN | Kansas | Arkansas | **L** 55–53 (3OT) | 52,847 |
| Texas Bowl | December 28, 2022 | NRG Stadium • Houston, TX | 8:00 p.m. | ESPN | Texas Tech | Ole Miss | **W** 42–25 | 53,251 |
| Cheez-It Bowl | December 29, 2022 | Camping World Stadium • Orlando, FL | 4:30 p.m. | ESPN | Oklahoma | No. 13 Florida State | **L** 35–32 | 61,520 |
| Alamo Bowl | December 29, 2022 | Alamodome • San Antonio, Texas | 8:00 p.m. | ESPN | No. 20 Texas | No. 12 Washington | **L** 27–20 | 62,730 |
**New Year's Six bowl games**
| Sugar Bowl | December 31, 2022 | Caesars Superdome • New Orleans, Louisiana | 11:00 a.m. | ESPN | No. 9 Kansas State | No. 5 Alabama | **L** 45–20 | 60,437 |
**College Football Playoff bowl games**
| Fiesta Bowl | December 31, 2022 | State Farm Stadium • Glendale, Arizona | 3:00 p.m. | ESPN | No. 3 TCU | No. 2 Michigan | **W** 51–45 | 71,723 |
| CFP National Championship Game | January 9, 2023 | SoFi Stadium • Inglewood, CA | 6:30 p.m. | ESPN | No. 3 TCU | No. 1 Georgia | **L** 7–65 | 72,628 |

Rankings are from CFP rankings. All times Central Time Zone. Big-12 teams shown in bold.

== Head to head matchups ==
Head to head Source:
| Team | Baylor | Iowa State | Kansas | Kansas State | Oklahoma | Oklahoma State | TCU | Texas | Texas Tech | West Virginia |
|---|---|---|---|---|---|---|---|---|---|---|
| Baylor | — | W 31–24 | W 35–23 | L 3-31 | W 38–35 | L 25–36 | L 28-29 | L 27-38 | W 45–17 | L 40–43 |
| Iowa State | L 24–31 | — | L 11–14 | L 9–10 | L 13–27 | L 14-20 | L 14-62 | L 21–24 | L 10-14 | W 31–14 |
| Kansas | L 23–35 | W 14–11 | — | L 27-47 | L 42–52 | W 37–16 | L 31–38 | L 14-55 | L 28-43 | W 55–42 ^{OT} |
| Kansas State | W 31-3 | W 10–9 | W 47-27 | — | W 41–34 | W 48–0 | L 28–38 | L 27–34 | W 37–28 | W 48-31 |
| Oklahoma | L 35–38 | W 27–13 | W 52–42 | L 34–41 | — | W 28-23 | L 24–55 | L 0–49 | L48-51^{OT} | L 20-23 |
| Oklahoma State | W 36–25 | W 20-14 | L 16–37 | L 0–48 | L 13-28 | — | L 40–43 2OT | W 41–34 | W 41–31 | L 19-24 |
| TCU | W 29-28 | W 62-14 | W 38–31 | W 38–28 | W 55–24 | W 43–40 2OT | — | W 17-10 | W 34–24 | W 41–31 |
| Texas | W 38-27 | W 24–21 | W 55-14 | W 34–27 | W 49–0 | L 41–34 | L 10-17 | — | L 34–37 ^{OT} | W 38–20 |
| Texas Tech | L 17–45 | W 14-10 | W 43-28 | L 28–37 | W 51-48^{OT} | L 31–41 | L 24–34 | W 37–34 ^{OT} | — | W 48–10 |
| West Virginia | W 43–40 | L 14–31 | L 42–55 ^{OT} | L 31-48 | W 23-20 | W24-19 | L 31–41 | L 20–38 | L 10–48 | — |

Updated with the results of all regular season conference games.

=== Big 12 vs other conferences ===
Regular Season

| Power 5 Conferences | Record |
|---|---|
| ACC | 2–2 |
| Big Ten | 2–0 |
| Notre Dame | 0–0 |
| Pac-12 | 2–0 |
| SEC | 1–1 |
| Power 5 Total | 7–3 |
| Other FBS Conferences | Record |
| American | 3–1 |
| C–USA | 2–0 |
| Independents (Excluding Notre Dame) | 0–1 |
| MAC | 3–0 |
| Mountain West | 0–0 |
| Sun Belt | 2–0 |
| Other FBS Total | 10–2 |
| FCS Opponents | Record |
| Football Championship Subdivision | 8–0 |
| Total Non-Conference Record | 25–5 |

Post Season

| Power 5 Conferences | Record |
|---|---|
| ACC | 0–1 |
| Big Ten | 1–1 |
| Notre Dame | 0–0 |
| Pac-12 | 0–1 |
| SEC | 1–3 |
| Power 5 Total | 2–6 |
| Other FBS Conferences | Record |
| American | 0–0 |
| C–USA | 0–0 |
| Independents (Excluding Notre Dame) | 0–0 |
| MAC | 0–0 |
| Mountain West | 0–1 |
| Sun Belt | 0–0 |
| Other FBS Total | 0–1 |
| Total Bowl Record | 2–7 |

==== Big 12 vs Power 5 matchups ====
This is a list of the Power Five conferences teams (ACC, Big Ten, Pac-12, Notre Dame and SEC).

| Date | Big 12 Team | Opponent | Conference | Location | Result |
|---|---|---|---|---|---|
| September 1 | West Virginia | No. 17 Pittsburgh | ACC | Heinz Field, Pittsburgh, Pennsylvania | L 31–38 |
| September 2 | TCU | Colorado | Pac-12 | Folsom Field, Boulder, Colorado | W 38–13 |
| September 10 | Iowa State | Iowa (rivalry) | Big Ten | Kinnick Stadium, Iowa City, Iowa | W 10–7 |
| September 10 | Kansas State | Missouri | SEC | Bill Snyder Family Stadium, Manhattan, Kansas | W 40–12 |
| September 10 | No. 11 Oklahoma State | Arizona State | Pac-12 | Boone Pickens Stadium, Stillwater, Oklahoma | W 34–17 |
| September 10 | Texas | No. 1 Alabama | SEC | Darrell K Royal–Texas Memorial Stadium, Austin, Texas | L 19–20 |
| September 17 | No. 6 Oklahoma | Nebraska (rivalry) | Big Ten | Memorial Stadium • Lincoln, NE | W 49–14 |
| September 17 | Texas Tech | No. 16 NC State | ACC | Carter-Finley Stadium • Raleigh, NC | L 14–27 |
| September 24 | West Virginia | Virginia Tech (rivalry) | ACC | Lane Stadium, Blacksburg, Virginia | W 33–10 |
| September 24 | Kansas | Duke | ACC | Memorial Stadium • Lawrence, KS | W 35–27 |

==== Big 12 vs Group of Five matchups ====
The following games include Big 12 teams competing against teams from The American, C-USA, MAC, Mountain West or Sun Belt.

| Date | Conference | Visitor | Home | Site | Score |
|---|---|---|---|---|---|
| September 1 | MAC | Central Michigan | No. 12 Oklahoma State | Boone Pickens Stadium • Stillwater, OK | W 58–44 |
| September 3 | C-USA | UTEP | No. 9 Oklahoma | Gaylord Family Oklahoma Memorial Stadium • Norman, OK | W 45–13 |
| September 3 | Sun Belt | Louisiana-Monroe | Texas | Darrell K Royal–Texas Memorial Stadium • Austin, TX | W 52–10 |
| September 10 | MAC | Kent State | No. 7 Oklahoma | Gaylord Family Oklahoma Memorial Stadium • Norman, OK | W 33–3 |
| September 10 | The American | No. 25 Houston | Texas Tech | Jones AT&T Stadium • Lubbock, TX | W 33–30 ^{2OT} |
| September 17 | Sun Belt | Texas State | No. 17 Baylor | McLane Stadium • Waco, TX | W 42-7 |
| September 17 | MAC | Ohio | Iowa State | Jack Trice Stadium • Ames, IA | W 43–10 |
| September 17 | The American | Kansas | Houston | TDECU Stadium • Houston, TX | W 48–30 |
| September 17 | The American | Tulane | Kansas State | Bill Snyder Family Stadium • Manhattan, KS | L 10–17 |
| September 17 | C-USA | UTSA | No. 21 Texas | Darrell K Royal–Texas Memorial Stadium • Austin, TX | W 41–20 |
| September 24 | The American | TCU | SMU (rivalry) | Gerald J. Ford Stadium • University Park, TX | W 42–34 |

==== Big 12 vs FBS independents matchups ====
The following games include Big 12 teams competing against FBS Independents which included Army, BYU, Liberty, New Mexico State, UConn and UMass.

| Date | Visitor | Home | Site | Score |
|---|---|---|---|---|
| September 10 | No. 9 Baylor | No. 21 BYU | LaVell Edwards Stadium • Provo, UT | L 26–20 ^{2OT} |

==== Big 12 vs FCS matchups ====
The Football Championship Subdivision comprises 13 conferences and two independent programs.

| Date | Visitor | Home | Site | Score |
|---|---|---|---|---|
| September 2 | Tennessee Tech | Kansas | Memorial Stadium • Lawrence, KS | W 56–10 |
| September 3 | Albany | No. 10 Baylor | McLane Stadium • Waco, TX | W 69–10 |
| September 3 | Southeast Missouri | Iowa State | Jack Trice Stadium • Ames, IA | W 42–10 |
| September 3 | South Dakota | Kansas State | Bill Snyder Family Memorial Stadium • Lawrence, KS | W 34–0 |
| September 3 | Murray State | Texas Tech | Jones A&T Stadium • Lubbock, TX | W 63–10 |
| September 10 | Tarleton | TCU | Amon G. Carter Stadium • Fort Worth, TX | W 59–17 |
| September 17 | Arkansas Pine Bluff | No. 8 Oklahoma State | Boone Pickens Stadium • Stillwater, OK | W 63–7 |
| September 17 | Towson | West Virginia | Milan Puskar Stadium • Morgantown, WV | W 65–7 |

== Rankings ==
Legend
| | Improvement in ranking |
| | Drop in ranking |
| | Not ranked previous week |
| | No change in ranking from previous week |
| RV | Received votes but were not ranked in Top 25 of poll |
| т | Tied with team above or below also with this symbol |

| | | Pre | Wk 1 | Wk 2 | Wk 3 | Wk 4 | Wk 5 | Wk 6 | Wk 7 | Wk 8 | Wk 9 | Wk 10 | Wk 11 | Wk 12 | Wk 13 | Wk 14 | Final |
|---|---|---|---|---|---|---|---|---|---|---|---|---|---|---|---|---|---|
| Baylor | AP | 10 | 9 | 17 | 17 | 16 | RV | RV | | | RV | RV | | | | | |
| Baylor | C | 10 | 8 | 19 | 17 | 14 | 22 | 23 | RV | RV | RV | RV | | | | | |
| Baylor | CFP | Not released | | | | | | | | | | | | | | | |
| Iowa State | AP | | | RV | | | | | | | | | | | | | |
| Iowa State | C | RV | | RV | RV | RV | | | | | | | | | | | |
| Iowa State | CFP | Not released | | | | | | | | | | | | | | | |
| Kansas | AP | | | | RV | RV | 19 | 19 | RV | | | RV | | | | | |
| Kansas | C | | | | RV | RV | 17 | 20 | RV | | | RV | | | | | |
| Kansas | CFP | Not released | | | | | | | | | | | | | | | |
| Kansas State | AP | RV | RV | RV | | 25 | 20 | 17 | 17 | 22 | 13 | 23 | 19 | 15 | 13 | 11 | 14 |
| Kansas State | C | RV | | RV | | RV | 20 | 16 | 17 | 22 | 14 | 22 | 17 | 13 | 10 | 9 | 14 |
| Kansas State | CFP | Not released | | | | | | | | | 13 | 19 | 15 | 12 | 10 | 9 | |
| Oklahoma | AP | 9 | 7 | 6 | 6 | 18 | RV | | | | | | | | | | |
| Oklahoma | C | 9 | 7 | 6 | 6 | 16 | RV | | | | | | | | | | |
| Oklahoma | CFP | Not released | | | | | | | | | | | | | | | |
| Oklahoma State | AP | 12 | 11 | 8 | 9 | 9 | 7 | 8 | 11 | 9 | 18 | RV | 24 | RV | | | |
| Oklahoma State | C | 11 | 10 | 7 | 8 | 7 | 7 | 7 | 11 | 9 | 18 | RV | 24 | | | | |
| Oklahoma State | CFP | Not released | | | | | | | | | 18 | | 22 | | | | |
| TCU | AP | | | | | RV | 17 | 13 | 8 | 7 | 7 | 4 | 4 | 4 | 3 | 3 | 2 |
| TCU | C | | | RV | RV | RV | 18 | 15 | 8 | 7 | 7 | 4 | 4 | 4 | 3 | 4 | 2 |
| TCU | CFP | Not released | | | | | | | | | 7 | 4 | 4 | 4 | 3 | 3 | |
| Texas | AP | RV | RV | 21 | 22 | | | 22 | 20 | RV | RV | 18 | RV | 24 | 21 | 21 | 25 |
| Texas | C | 18 (1) | 22 | 20 | 19 | RV | RV | 24 | 21 | RV | RV | 18 | RV | 24 | 21 | 21 | 25 |
| Texas | CFP | Not released | | | | | | | | | 24 | 18 | | 23 | 20 | 20 | |
| Texas Tech | AP | | | RV | | RV | | | | | | | | | | | RV |
| Texas Tech | C | | RV | RV | | RV | | | | | | | | | | | RV |
| Texas Tech | CFP | Not released | | | | | | | | | | | | | | | |
| West Virginia | AP | | | | | | | | | | | | | | | | |
| West Virginia | C | | | | | | | | | | | | | | | | |
| West Virginia | CFP | Not released | | | | | | | | | | | | | | | |

== Awards and honors ==
=== Player of the week honors ===
| Week | Offensive | | | Defensive | | | Special Teams | | | Newcomer | | |
| Week | Player | Team | Position | Player | Team | Position | Player | Team | Position | Player | Team | Position |
|---|---|---|---|---|---|---|---|---|---|---|---|---|
| Week 1 | Spencer Sanders | Oklahoma State | QB | Lonnie Phelps | Kansas | DE | Derius Davis | TCU | WR/PR/KR | CJ Donaldson | West Virginia | RB |
| Week 2 | Donovan Smith | Texas Tech | QB | Cobee Bryant | Kansas | DB | Phillip Brooks | Kansas State | WR/PR/KR | Colby Reeder | Iowa State | LB |
| Week 2 | Donovan Smith | Texas Tech | QB | Cobee Bryant | Kansas | DB | Phillip Brooks | Kansas State | WR/PR/KR | Dillon Gabriel | Oklahoma | QB |
| Week 3 | Jalon Daniels | Kansas | QB | Jahdae Barron | Texas | DB | Trace Ford | Oklahoma State | DE | Richard Reese | Baylor | RB |
| Week 4 | Adrian Martinez | Kansas State | QB | Bryson Jackson | Baylor | LB | Trey Wolff | Texas Tech | K | Kobe Savage | Kansas State | DB |
| Week 4 | Adrian Martinez | Kansas State | QB | Reggie Pearson | Texas Tech | DB | Trey Wolff | Texas Tech | K | Kobe Savage | Kansas State | DB |
| Week 5 | Max Duggan | TCU | QB | Khalid Duke | Kansas State | LB | Jaden Nixon | Oklahoma State | RB | Jaden Nixon | Oklahoma State | RB |
| Week 5 | Max Duggan | TCU | QB | Jason Taylor II | Oklahoma State | DB | Jaden Nixon | Oklahoma State | RB | Adrian Martinez | Kansas State | QB |
| Week 6 | Quentin Johnston | TCU | WR | Josh Hayes | Kansas State | DB | Tanner Brown | Oklahoma State | K | Quinn Ewers | Texas | QB |
| Week 7 | Max Duggan | TCU | QB | Jaylan Ford | Texas | LB | Tanner Brown | Oklahoma State | K | Dillon Gabriel | Oklahoma | QB |
| Week 7 | Tony Mathis Jr. | West Virginia | RB | Jaylan Ford | Texas | LB | Casey Legg | West Virginia | K | Dillon Gabriel | Oklahoma | QB |
| Week 8 | Spencer Sanders | Oklahoma State | QB | Jason Taylor II | Oklahoma State | S | Oliver Straw | West Virginia | P | Behren Morton | Texas Tech | QB |
| Week 9 | Will Howard | Kansas State | QB | Gabe Hall | Baylor | DL | Ty Zentner | Kansas State | P/K | Richard Reese | Baylor | RB |
| Week 9 | Will Howard | Kansas State | QB | Gabe Hall | Baylor | DL | Michael Turk | Oklahoma | P | Richard Reese | Baylor | RB |
| Week 10 | Devin Neal | Kansas | RB | Jaylan Ford | Texas | LB | Derius Davis | TCU | WR/PR/KR | Johnny Hodges | TCU | LB |
| Week 10 | Devin Neal | Kansas | RB | Jaylan Ford | Texas | LB | Derius Davis | TCU | WR/PR/KR | Cartevious Norton | Iowa State | RB |
| Week 11 | Garrett Greene | West Virginia | QB | Johnny Hodges | TCU | LB | Trey Wolff | Texas Tech | K | Drake Cheatum | Kansas State | DB |
| Week 11 | Garrett Greene | West Virginia | QB | Johnny Hodges | TCU | LB | Oliver Straw | West Virginia | P | Kendal Daniels | Oklahoma State | DB |
| Week 12 | Bijan Robinson | Texas | RB | Brendan Mott | Kansas State | DE | Griffin Kell | TCU | K | CJ Coldon | Oklahoma | DB |
| Week 13 | Dillon Gabriel | Oklahoma | QB | Jaylan Ford | Texas | LB | Trey Wolff | Texas Tech | K | Dillon Gabriel | Oklahoma | QB |
| Week 13 | Bijan Robinson | Texas | QB | Jaylan Ford | Texas | LB | Trey Wolff | Texas Tech | K | Jaylen Anderson | West Virginia | RB |

=== Big 12 Individual Awards ===
The following individuals received postseason honors as voted by the Big 12 Conference football coaches at the end of the season.

| Award | Player | School |
|---|---|---|
| Offensive Player of the Year | Max Duggan, QB | TCU |
| Defensive Player of the Year | Felix Anudike-Uzomah, DE | Kansas State |
| Special Teams Player of the Year | Derius Davis, PR/KR | TCU |
| Offensive Freshman of the Year | Richard Reese, RB | Baylor |
| Offensive lineman of the Year | Cooper Beebe | Kansas State |
| Defensive Freshman of the Year | Kendal Daniels, S | Oklahoma State |
| Defensive lineman of the Year | Felix Anudike-Uzomah, DE | Kansas State |
| Offensive Newcomer of the Year | Dillon Gabriel, QB | Oklahoma |
| Defensive Newcomer of the Year | Johnny Hodges, LB | TCU |
| Chuck Neinas Coach of the Year | Sonny Dykes# | TCU |
# - Unanimous choice

=== All-conference teams ===
The following players earned All-Big 12 honors. Any teams showing (_) following their name are indicating the number of All-Big 12 Conference Honors awarded to that university for 1st team and 2nd team respectively.

First Team

| Position | Player | Class | Team |
|---|---|---|---|
First Team Offense
| QB | Max Duggan (U) | Sr. | TCU |
| RB | Kendre Miller | Jr. | TCU |
| RB | Bijan Robinson (U) | Jr. | UT |
| FB | Ben Sinnott | So. | KSU |
| WR | Xavier Hutchinson | Sr. | ISU |
| WR | Marvin Mims | Jr. | OU |
| WR | Quentin Johnston (U) | Jr. | TCU |
| TE | Ja'Tavion Sanders | So. | UT |
| OL | Cooper Beebe | Jr. | KSU |
| OL | Anton Harrison | Jr. | OU |
| OL | Alan Ali | Sr. | TCU |
| OL | Steve Avila | Sr. | TCU |
| OL | Zach Frazier | So. | WVU |
First Team Defense
| DL | Siaki Ika | Jr. | BU |
| DL | Will McDonald IV | Sr. | ISU |
| DL | Felix Anudike-Uzomah (U) | Jr. | KSU |
| DL | Tyree Wilson | Sr. | TTU |
| DL | Dante Stills | Sr. | WVU |
| LB | Dee Winters | Sr. | TCU |
| LB | Jaylan Ford | Jr. | UT |
| LB | DeMarvion Overshown | Sr. | UT |
| DB | Cobee Bryant | So. | KU |
| DB | JuJu Brents | Sr. | KSU |
| DB | Jason Taylor II | Sr. | OSU |
| DB | Tre Tomlinson | Sr. | TCU |
| DB | Josh Newton | Jr. | TCU |
First Team Special Teams
| PK | Griffin Kell | Sr. | TCU |
| P | Michael Turk | Sr. | OU |
| RT | Derius Davis | Sr. | TCU |

Second Team

| Position | Player | Class | Team |
|---|---|---|---|
Second Team Offense
| QB | Jalon Daniels | Jr. | KU |
| RB | Deuce Vaughn | Jr. | KSU |
| RB | Eric Gray | Sr. | OU |
| FB | Dillon Doyle | Sr. | BU |
| FB | Jared Rus | Sr. | ISU |
| WR | Malik Knowles | Sr. | KSU |
| WR | Xavier Worthy | So. | UT |
| WR | Bryce Ford-Wheaton | Jr. | WVU |
| TE | Mason Fairchild | Sr. | KU |
| TE | Brayden Willis | Sr. | OU |
| OL | Jacob Gall | Sr. | BU |
| OL | Connor Galvin | Sr. | BU |
| OL | Trevor Downing | Sr. | ISU |
| OL | Mike Novitsky | Jr. | KU |
| OL | Kelvin Banks Jr. | Fr. | UT |
Second Team Defense
| DL | Lonnie Phelps | Jr. | KU |
| DL | Ethan Downs | So. | OU |
| DL | Brock Martin | Sr. | OSU |
| DL | Collin Oliver | So. | OSU |
| DL | Keondre Coburn | Sr. | UT |
| LB | Dillon Doyle | Sr. | BU |
| LB | Mason Cobb | Jr. | OSU |
| LB | Johnny Hodges | Jr. | TCU |
| DB | Anthony Johnson Jr. | Sr. | ISU |
| DB | T. J. Tampa | Jr. | ISU |
| DB | Kobe Savage | Jr. | KSU |
| DB | Kendal Daniels | Fr. | OSU |
| DB | Malik Dunlap | Sr. | TTU |
Second Team Special Teams
| PK | Tanner Brown | Sr. | OSU |
| P | Ty Zentner | Sr. | KSU |
| RT | Phillip Brooks | Sr. | KSU |

(U) - Unanimous Selection

Honorable mentions

- BAYLOR: Monaray Baldwin (WR), Jacob Gall (OLoY), Gabe Hall (DL), Gavin Holmes (KR/PR), Siaki Ika (DLoY), Matt Jones (LB), Devin Lemear (DB, DFoY), John Mayers (PK), Micah Mazzccua (OL), Grant Miller (OL), Mark Milton (DB), Isaac Power (P), Hal Presley (WR), Richard Reese (RB), Blake Shapen (QB), Ben Sims (TE), Al Walcott (DB)
- IOWA STATE: M.J. Anderson (DL), Jeremiah Cooper (DFoY), Hunter Dekkers (QB), Trevor Downing (OLoY), Beau Freyler (DB), Will McDonald IV (DPoY, DLoY), Myles Purchase (DB), Colby Reeder (LB, DNoY), O’Rien Vance (LB)
- KANSAS: Earl Bostick Jr. (OL), Kenny Logan Jr. (DB), Devin Neal (RB, OPoY), Lonnie Phelps (DNoY, DLoY), Dominick Puni (OL, ONoY)
- KANSAS STATE: Ekow Boye-Doe (DB), Phillip Brooks (STPoY), D.J. Giddens (OFoY), Hayden Gillum (OL), Daniel Green (LB), Eli Huggins (DL), K.T. Leveston (OL), Adrian Martinez (QB, ONoY), Austin Moore (LB), Kobe Savage (DNoY), Deuce Vaughn (OPoY)
- OKLAHOMA: Billy Bowman (DB), Justin Broiles (DB), C.J. Coldon (DNoY), Dillon Gabriel (QB), Anton Harrison (OLoY), Marvin Mims (KR/PR), Chris Murray (OL), Andrew Raym (OL), Danny Stutsman (LB), Michael Turk (STPoY), David Ugwoegbu (LB), DaShaun White (LB)
- OKLAHOMA STATE: Tanner Brown (STPoY), Tyler Lacy (DL), Jabbar Muhammad (DB), Jaden Nixon (KR/PR, OFoY), Brennan Presley (WR), Spencer Sanders (QB), Jake Schultz (FB), Jake Springfield (OL), Jason Taylor II (DPoY), Hunter Woodard (OL)
- TCU: Alan Ali (ONoY), Steve Avila (OLoY), Taye Barber (WR), Millard Bradford (DB), Bud Clark (DB), Andrew Coker (OL), Brandon Coleman (OL), Derius Davis (WR), Tre Tomlinson (DPoY), Dylan Horton (DL), Jamoi Hodge (LB), Jordy Sandy (P), Jared Wiley (TE), Damonic Williams (DFoY)
- TEXAS: Bert Auburn (PK), Kelvin Banks Jr. (OFoY, OLoY), Jahdae Barron (DB), Keondre Coburn (DLoY), Anthony Cook (DB), Quinn Ewers (ONoY), Jaylan Ford (DPoY), Roschon Johnson (RB), Christian Jones (OL), Moro Ojomo (DL), Bijan Robinson (OPoY), Keilan Robinson (KR/PR, STPoY), Barryn Sorrell (DL), Jerrin Thompson (DB), T'Vondre Sweat (DL), Ryan Watts (DB, DNoY), Jordan Whittington (WR)
- TEXAS TECH: Joseph Adedire (DFoY), Jerand Bradley (WR), Tony Bradford Jr. (DL), Jaylon Hutchings (DL), Austin McNamara (P), Krishon Merriweather (LB), Behren Morton (OFoY), Landon Peterson (OL), Myles Price (WR), SaRodorick Thompson (RB), Henry Teeter (FB), Marquis Waters (DB), Dennis Wilburn (OL), Rayshad Williams (DB), Tyree Wilson (DPoY, DLoY), Trey Wolff (PK, STPoY)
- WEST VIRGINIA: Jasir Cox (DB), CJ Donaldson (ONoY, OFoY), Zach Frazier (OLoY), Sam James (WR), Jordan Jefferson (DL), Lee Kpogba (LB, DNoY), Wyatt Milum (OL), Dante Stills (DLoY)

=== All-Americans ===
Currently, the NCAA compiles consensus all-America teams in the sports of Division I-FBS football and Division I men's basketball using a point system computed from All-America teams named by coaches associations or media sources. The system consists of three points for a first-team honor, two points for second-team honor, and one point for third-team honor. Honorable mention and fourth team or lower recognitions are not accorded any points. College Football All-American consensus teams are compiled by position and the player accumulating the most points at each position is named first team consensus all-American. Currently, the NCAA recognizes All-Americans selected by the AP, AFCA, FWAA, TSN, and the WCFF to determine Consensus and Unanimous All-Americans. Any player named to the First Team by all five of the NCAA-recognized selectors is deemed a Unanimous All-American.

| Position | Player | School | Selector | Unanimous | Consensus |
|---|---|---|---|---|---|
First Team All-Americans
| OL | Steve Avila | TCU | AFCA, FWAA, WCFF | | ✓ |
| RB | Bijan Robinson | UT | AFCA, AP, CBS, ESPN, FWAA, Ath, TSN, USAT, WCFF | ✓ | ✓ |
| AP | Deuce Vaughn | KSU | AFCA, AP, Ath, TSN | | ✓ |
| WR | Xavier Hutchinson | ISU | AP | | |
| DB | Tre Tomlinson | TCU | AP, ESPN, TSN, USAT | | |
| OL | Cooper Beebe | KSU | ESPN, Ath, TSN | | |
| DL | Tyree Wilson | TTU | FWAA, Ath, USAT | | |
| PR | Derius Davis | TCU | FWAA | | |
| DL | Felix Anudike-Uzomah | KSU | USAT | | |

| Position | Player | School | Selector |
|---|---|---|---|
Second Team All-Americans (No ESPN)
| WR | Xavier Hutchinson | ISU | AFCA, CBS |
| DL | Felix Anudike-Uzomah | KSU | AFCA, CBS, FWAA, WCFF |
| DL | Tyree Wilson | TTU | AFCA, AP |
| DB | Tre Tomlinson | TCU | AFCA, CBS, FWAA |
| QB | Max Duggan | TCU | AP, FWAA, Ath, TSN |
| OL | Cooper Beebe | KSU | AP, CBS, USAT |
| OL | Steve Avila | TCU | AP, Ath, USAT |
| PR | Derius Davis | TCU | CBS |
| AP | Malik Knowles | KSU | CBS |
| LB | Jaylan Ford | UT | Ath |
| RB | Deuce Vaughn | KSU | USAT |
| DB | Jason Taylor II | OSU | WCFF |

| Position | Player | School | Selector |
|---|---|---|---|
Third Team All-Americans (AP Only)
| DL | Felix Anudike-Uzomah | KSU | AP |
| LB | Jaylan Ford | UT | AP |

==== List of All American Teams ====
- American Football Coaches Association All-America Team
- Associated Press All-America Team
- CBS Sports All-America Team
- ESPN All-America Team
- Football Writers Association of America All-America Team
- The Athletic All-America Team
- Sporting News 2022 College Football All-America Team
- USA Today All-America Team
- Walter Camp Football Foundation All-America Team

=== All-Academic ===
First team

- BAYLOR: Ben Hamilton, Ben Sims, Blake Shapen, Brayden Utley, Brooks Miller, Caleb Parker, Chidi Ogbonnaya, Cooper Lanz, Devin Lemear, Dillon Doyle, Connor Galvin, Garrison Grimes, Grant Miller, Griffin Speaks, Isaac Power, Jacob Gall, John Mayers, Jonathan Davidson, Mark Milton, Noah Rauschenberg, Tevin WIliams III, TJ Franklin, Tripp Mitchell, Tyrone Brown
- IOWA STATE: Caleb Bacon, Blake Clark, Beau Coberley, Easton Dean, Trevor Downing, Beau Freyler, Connor Guess, Jacob Hillman, Kendell Jackson, Anthony Johnson, Kyle Krezek, Isaiah Lee, Tyler Mark, Myles Mendeszoon, Tyler Moore, Drake Nettles, Blake Peterson, Myles Purchase, Jake Remsburg, Jared Rus, O'Rien Vance, Gerry Vaughn, Hunter Zenzen
- KANSAS: Tabor Allen, Jelani Arnold, Earl Bostick Jr., Kobe Bryant, Sam Burt, Jared Casey, Mac Copeland, Cam'ron Dabney, Jalon Daniels, Ra'Mello Dotson, Dylan Downing, Emory Duggar, Tommy Dunn Jr., Mason Fairchild, Michael Ford Jr., Donovan Gaines, Luke Grimm, Hayden Hatcher, Kwinton Lassiter, Devin Neal, Mike Novitsky, Cole Petrus, Kelan Robinson, Jackson Satterwhite, Quentin Skinner, Kevin Terry, Reis Vernon
- KANSAS STATE: Nick Allen, Cooper Beebe, Jack Blumer, Jax Dineen, Jace Friesen, Daniel Green, Sam Hecht, Thomas Helten, Robert Hentz, Will Howard, Eli Huggins, Andrew Leingang, KT Leveston, Matthew Maschmeier, Cincere Mason, Nate Matlack, Christian Moore, Austin Moore, Brendan Mott, Beau Palmer, Randen Plattner, Seth Porter, Desmond Purnell, Jake Rubley, Ben Sinnott, Cody Stufflebean, Chris Tennant, Kade Warner, Sammy Wheeler
- OKLAHOMA: Justin Broiles, Kevin Gilliam, Eric Gray, Carsten Groos, Pierce Hudgens, Kasey Kelleher, Jaden Knowles, Ryan Peoples, Zach Schmit, Drake Stoops, Ty Taylor, Michael Turk, Eric Windham, Maureese Wren
- OKLAHOMA STATE: Constantino Borrelli, Jaden Bray, Cale Cabbiness, Braden Cassity, Kendal Daniels, Trace Ford, Raymond Gay, Bryson Green, Gunnar Gundy, Alex Hale, Matt Hembrough, Tom Hutton, Aden Kelley, Ben Kopenski, Brock Martin, Joe Michalski, Zach Middleton, Collin Oliver, Brennan Presley, Jordan Reagan, Parker Robertson, Eli Russ, Jake Schultz, Jake Springfield, Logan Ward, Ty Williams, Preston Wilson, Hunter Woodard, Zeke Zaragoza
- TCU: Trent Battle, Chase Curtis, Emari Demercado, Dominic DiNunzio, George Ellis, Alex Honig, Mark Perry, Curtis Raymond, D'Andre Rogers, Jared Wiley
- TEXAS: Parker Alford, Junior Angilau, Bert Auburn, Michael Balis, Ben Ballard, Hudson Card, Zach Edwards, Nathan Hatter, Gunnar Helm, Roschon Johnson, Gabriel Lozano, Jake Majors, Byron Murphy, Ovie Oghoufo, Moro Ojomo, Logan Parr, Devin Richardson, Bijan Robinson, Ja'Tavion Sanders, Ryan Watts, Chad Wolf, Xavier Worthy, Charles Wright
- TEXAS TECH: Cole Boyd, Jerald Bradley, Tahj Brooks, Blake Burris, Patrick Curley, Kenneth Elder, Charles Esters, Loic Fouonji, Jaylon Hutchings, Jacoby Jackson, Trent Low, Nehemiah Martinez I, Tyrique Matthews, La'Byreous Moore, Behren Morton, Jesiah Pierre, Charles Robinson, Caleb Rodkey, Isaac Smith, Marquis Waters, Cameron Watts, Jett Whitfield, Trey Wolff, Matthew Young
- WEST VIRGINIA: Austin Brinkman, Aubrey Burks, Matt Cavallaro, C.J. Cole, Preston Fox, Zach Frazier, Garrett Greene, Jordan Jefferson, Justin Johnson Jr., Casey Legg, Graeson Malashevich, Sean Martin, Wyatt Milum, Doug Nester, Mike O'Laughlin, Kaden Prather, Tomas Rica, Reese Smith, Edward Vesterinen

Second team

- BAYLOR: Byron Hansard, Christian Morgan, Collin Losack, Drake Dabney, Gavin Byers, Gavin Holmes, Jackie Marshall, Jordan Jenkins, Byron Drones, Matt Jones, Monaray Baldwin, Sqwirl Williams, Tate Williams, Tony Anyanwu
- IOWA STATE: Aidan Bitter, Hunter Dekkers, DeShawn Hanika, Jarrod Hufford, Stevo Klotz, Carston Marshall, Jaylin Noel, Tyler Onyedim, Cameron Shook, JR Singleton, Malik Verdon
- KANSAS: Jacob Borcila, Zion DeBose, Daniel Hishaw Jr., Kenny Logan Jr., Steven McBride
- KANSAS STATE: JuJu Brents, Damian Ilalio, Shane Porter, Deuce Vaughn, Ty Zentner
- OKLAHOMA: Nate Anderson, Robert Congel, Reggie Grimes, Jordan Kelley, Reed Lindsey, Jake McCoy, Andre Raym
- OKLAHOMA STATE: Sione Asi, Clayton Barbour, Caleb Etienne, Jaden Nixon
- TCU: Noah Bolticoff, Andrew Coker, Max Duggan, Gunnar Henderson, Carter Ware, Marcus Williams
- TEXAS: Luke Brockermeyer, Casey Cain, Christian Jones, Barryn Sorrell, Michael Taaffe, Jordan Whittington, Doak Wilson
- TEXAS TECH: Jackson Baggett, Tony Bradford Jr., Ethan Carde, Jackson Knotts, Austin McNamara, Joseph Plunk, Bryce Ramirez, Bryce Robinson, Tyler Shough, Donovan Smith, Henry Teeter, Mason Tharp, Jack Tucker, Rayshad Williams, Tyree Wilson, Robert Wooten, Weston Wright
- WEST VIRGINIA: Caden Biser, Caleb Coleman, Tyler Connolly, Treylan Davis, Jairo Faverus, Davis Mallinger, Tony Mathis Jr., Taurus Simmons

=== National award winners ===
Davey O'Brien Award

Max Duggan, TCU

Johny Unitas Golden Arm Award

Max Duggan, TCU

Doak Walker Award

Bijan Robinson, Texas

Paycom Jim Thorpe Award

Tre Tomlinson, TCU

Walter Camp Football Foundation Coach of the Year

Sonny Dykes, TCU

ESPN's Home Depot National Coach of the Year

Sonny Dykes, TCU

Broyles Award

Garrett Riley, TCU

AP Coach of the Year

Sonny Dykes, TCU

Eddie Robinson Coach of the Year

Sonny Dykes, TCU

Earl Campbell Tyler Rose Award Finalists

Deuce Vaughn, Kansas State

Max Duggan, TCU

Bijan Robinson, Texas

Bleacher Report All-America Team

OG Cooper Beebe, Kansas State; RB Bijan Robinson, Texas

Phil Steele 2022 All-America First Team

PR Derius Davis, TCU; OL Steve Avila, TCU; LB/DB Tre Tomlinson, TCU; RB Bijan Robinson, Texas; DL Tyree Wilson, Texas Tech

Phil Steele 2022 All-America Second Team

AP Deuce Vaughn, Kansas State; DL Felix Anudike-Uzomah, Kansas State; QB Max Duggan, TCU

Phil Steele 2022 All-America Third Team

DL Siaki Ika, Baylor; WR Xavier Hutchinson, Iowa State; LS Matt Hembrough, Oklahoma State; DB Jason Taylor II, Oklahoma State; LB Jaylan Ford, Texas

Phil Steele 2022 All-America Fourth Team

OL Cooper Beebe, Kansas State; WR Quentin Johnston, TCU; C Zach Frazier, West Virginia

Phil Steele 2022 All-America Honorable Mention

C Jacob Gall, Baylor; OL Connor Galvin, Baylor; P Michael Turk, Oklahoma; K Tanner Brown, Oklahoma State; AP Malik Knowles, Kansas State; LS Randen Plattner, Kansas State; LB/DB DeMarvion Overshown, Texas; TE Ja'Tavion Sanders, Texas

Academic All-America Team Selected by the College Sports Communicators

First Team: LB Dillon Doyle, Baylor

Second Team: QB Jalon Daniels, Kansas; OL Earl Bostic Jr., Kansas; DL Sam Burt, Kansas; DL Ovie Oghoufo, Texas; K Casey Legg, West Virginia

== Home game announced attendance ==
| Team | Stadium | Capacity | Game 1 | Game 2 | Game 3 | Game 4 | Game 5 | Game 6 | Game 7 | Total | Average | % of capacity |
|---|---|---|---|---|---|---|---|---|---|---|---|---|
| Baylor | McLane Stadium | 45,140 | 41,242 | **45,597** | **47,979†** | **45,882** | **47,686** | 44,393 | --- | 272,779 | 45.463 | 100.7% |
| Iowa State | Jack Trice Stadium | 61,500 | 57,142 | 58,138 | 58,069 | 60,561† | 58,716 | 56,109 | 52,676 | 401,411 | 57,344 | 93.2% |
| Kansas | David Booth Kansas Memorial Stadium | 47,233 | 34,902 | 47,233† | 47,233† | 47,233† | 43,606 | 38,246 | --- | 258,453 | 43,076 | 91.2% |
| Kansas State | Bill Snyder Family Stadium | 50,000 | **50,469** | **51,806** | **50,887** | **50,782** | **51,133** | **51,216** | **51,861†** | 358,154 | 51,165 | 102.3% |
| Oklahoma | Gaylord Family Oklahoma Memorial Stadium | 86,112 | 83,173 | 83,911 | 84,376† | 83,874 | 83,546 | 84,132 | --- | 503,012 | 83,835 | 97.4% |
| Oklahoma State | Boone Pickens Stadium | 55,509 | 53,808 | 54,949 | 55,509† | 55,509† | 55,509† | 55,509† | 52,353 | 383,146 | 54,735 | 98.6% |
| TCU | Amon G. Carter Stadium | 46,000 | 43,197 | **49,095** | **49,594†** | **47,881** | 44,760 | 44,846 | --- | 279,373 | 46,562 | 101.2% |
| Texas | Darrell K Royal–Texas Memorial Stadium | 100,119 | 94,873 | **105,213**‡ | **102,520** | **100,740** | 100,072 | **104,203** | 94,706 | 702,327 | 100,332 | 100.2% |
| Texas Tech | Jones AT&T Stadium | 60,454 | 60,201 | 56,271 | **60,975†** | 56,530 | **60,705** | 55,613 | 51,126 | 401,421 | 57,346 | 94.9% |
| West Virginia | Milan Puskar Stadium | 60,000 | 52,188† | 50,703 | 45,293 | 50,426 | 50,281 | 37,055 | --- | 285,946 | 47,658 | 79.4% |

Bold – exceeded capacity
† Season high
‡ Record stadium Attendance

== NFL draft ==
The following list includes all Big 12 Players who were drafted in the 2023 NFL draft

| Player | Position | School | Draft Round | Round Pick | Overall Pick | Team |
|---|---|---|---|---|---|---|
| Tyree Wilson | DE | Texas Tech | 1 | 7 | 7 | Las Vegas Raiders |
| Bijan Robinson | RB | Texas | 1 | 8 | 8 | Atlanta Falcons |
| Will McDonald IV | DE | Iowa State | 1 | 15 | 15 | New York Jets |
| Quentin Johnston | WR | TCU | 1 | 21 | 21 | Los Angeles Chargers |
| Anton Harrison | OT | Oklahoma | 1 | 27 | 27 | Jacksonville Jaguars |
| Felix Anudike-Uzomah | DE | Kansas State | 1 | 31 | 31 | Kansas City Chiefs |
| Steve Avila | OG | TCU | 2 | 5 | 36 | Los Angeles Rams |
| JuJu Brents | CB | Kansas State | 2 | 13 | 44 | Indianapolis Colts |
| Marvin Mims | WR | Oklahoma | 2 | 32 | 63 | Denver Broncos |
| Kendre Miller | RB | TCU | 3 | 8 | 71 | New Orleans Saints |
| DeMarvion Overshown | LB | Texas | 3 | 27 | 90 | Dallas Cowboys |
| Wanya Morris | OT | Oklahoma | 3 | 29 | 92 | Kansas City Chiefs |
| Siaki Ika | DT | Baylor | 3 | 35 | 98 | Cleveland Browns |
| Dylan Horton | DE | TCU | 4 | 7 | 109 | Houston Texans |
| Roschon Johnson | RB | Texas | 4 | 13 | 115 | Chicago Bears |
| Derius Davis | WR | TCU | 4 | 23 | 125 | Los Angeles Chargers |
| Tyler Lacy | DE | Oklahoma State | 4 | 28 | 130 | Jacksonville Jaguars |
| Eric Gray | RB | Oklahoma | 5 | 37 | 172 | New York Giants |
| Josh Hayes | CB | Kansas State | 6 | 4 | 181 | Tampa Bay Buccaneers |
| Tre Tomlinson | CB | TCU | 6 | 5 | 182 | Los Angeles Rams |
| Keondre Coburn | DT | Texas | 6 | 17 | 194 | Kansas City Chiefs |
| Xavier Hutchinson | WR | Iowa State | 6 | 28 | 205 | Houston Texans |
| Deuce Vaughn | RB | Kansas State | 6 | 35 | 212 | Dallas Cowboys |
| Dante Stills | DT | West Virginia | 6 | 36 | 213 | Arizona Cardinals |
| Dee Winters | LB | TCU | 6 | 39 | 216 | San Francisco 49ers |
| Jason Taylor II | S | Oklahoma State | 7 | 17 | 234 | Los Angeles Rams |
| Max Duggan | QB | TCU | 7 | 22 | 239 | Los Angeles Chargers |
| Anthony Johnson Jr. | S | Iowa State | 7 | 25 | 242 | Green Bay Packers |
| Brayden Willis | TE | Oklahoma | 7 | 30 | 247 | San Francisco 49ers |
| Moro Ojomo | DE | Texas | 7 | 32 | 249 | Philadelphia Eagles |
