= Derius Davis =

American football player (born 2000)

No. 12 – Los Angeles Chargers
- Positions: Wide receiver, return specialist
- Roster status: Active

Personal information
- Born: September 11, 2000 (age 26); St. Francisville, Louisiana, U.S.
- Listed height: 5 ft 8 in (1.73 m)
- Listed weight: 165 lb (75 kg)

Career information
- High school: West Feliciana (St. Francisville)
- College: TCU (2018–2022)
- NFL draft: 2023: 4th round, 125th overall pick

Career history
- Los Angeles Chargers (2023–present)

Awards and highlights
- Second-team All-Pro (2023) (Note: Selected as a punt returner); PFWA All-Rookie Team (2023); Jet Award (2022); Big 12 Special Teams Player of the Year (2022); Second-team All-Big 12 (2021); First-team All-Big 12 (2022)

Career NFL statistics as of Week 5, 2026
- Receptions: 31
- Receiving yards: 194
- Rushing yards: 145
- Return yards: 2,195
- Total touchdowns: 3
- Stats at Pro Football Reference

Derius Richaud Davis (born September 11, 2000) is an American professional football wide receiver and return specialist for the Los Angeles Chargers of the National Football League (NFL). He played college football for the TCU Horned Frogs before being selected by the Chargers in the fourth round of the 2023 NFL draft.

== Early life ==
Davis grew up in St. Francisville, Louisiana and attended West Feliciana High School, where he helped lead the Saints to a 3A state championship as a senior in 2017 and also starred in track, winning the 200-meter dash at the state meet.

Rated as a 3-star prospect, Davis chose to play his college football at Texas Christian University in Fort Worth, Texas over a scholarship offer from Tennessee. He enrolled at TCU in the summer of 2018.

== College career ==
Davis scored two touchdowns in his collegiate debut, the Frogs' 2018 season opener, a 55–7 home victory over Southern – first on a 12-yard reception and later on a 73-yard punt return. In the regular season finale, his 24-yard touchdown reception from Grayson Muehlstein in the 4th quarter helped seal a home victory over Oklahoma State which earned TCU bowl eligibility and a trip to play Cal in the Cheez-It Bowl. He ended his freshman campaign with 8 receptions for 104 yards.

After catching 11 passes for 151 yards as a sophomore in 2019, Davis took over primary punt return duties from Jalen Reagor as a junior in 2020. His second and third career punt return touchdowns came in road victories over Baylor and Kansas. In November, he once again came up with a clutch touchdown reception against Oklahoma State, scoring on a 71-yard pass from Max Duggan in the 4th quarter of the Frogs' 29–22 upset victory over the 15th-ranked Cowboys.

Davis became a much more central part of TCU's offense in 2021, leading the Frogs with 36 receptions and placing second on the team with 536 receiving yards on the season. He set new career highs with 6 receptions and 106 yards in a home win against Kansas and scored his first career kickoff return against West Virginia.

Taking advantage of the NCAA decision to grant an extra year of eligibility to athletes due to the COVID-19 pandemic, Davis elected to return to TCU for a second senior season in 2022. He scored the Frogs' first points of the season on a 60-yard punt return for a touchdown, the fourth of his career, in the first half of the opener at Colorado. In a late September road victory over crosstown rival SMU, Davis caught a short pass from Duggan and took it 80 yards for a touchdown. On the play, Davis was clocked at a top speed of 23.47mph – becoming the only player in all of college football or the NFL to break the 23 mph barrier in game play. During TCU's 12–0 start to the season, Davis set a new career high with 7 receptions in a blowout win over 18th-ranked Oklahoma and added touchdown receptions in come-from-behind victories over 19th-ranked Kansas, 17th-ranked Kansas State and Texas Tech. In the game against Tech, he also notched his fifth career punt return touchdown, an 82-yarder, to break the school record that was previously held by KaVontae Turpin. At the conclusion of the regular season, he was named the Big 12 Special Teams Player of the Year.

== Professional career ==
Davis was selected in the fourth round of the 2023 USFL draft by the Birmingham Stallions.

Pre-draft measurables
Height	Weight	Arm length	Hand span	Wingspan	40-yard dash	10-yard split	20-yard split	20-yard shuttle	Three-cone drill	Vertical jump	Broad jump	Bench press
5 ft 8 3/8 in (1.74 m)	165 lb (75 kg)	29 1/4 in (0.74 m)	8 in (0.20 m)	5 ft 9 in (1.75 m)	4.36 s	1.46 s	2.50 s	4.38 s	7.23 s	30.5 in (0.77 m)	9 ft 7 in (2.92 m)	17 reps
All values from NFL Combine/Pro Day

Davis was drafted by the Los Angeles Chargers in the fourth round, 125th overall, of the 2023 NFL draft.

In Week 9 during Monday Night Football against the New York Jets, Davis returned a punt 87 yards for a touchdown, leading to the Chargers winning 27–6, earning AFC Special Teams Player of the Week for his performance. He was named to the PFWA NFL All-Rookie Team.

== NFL career statistics ==
Legend
**Bold**	Career high

=== Regular season ===
Year	Team	Games		Receiving					Rushing					Fumbles	
Year	Team	GP	GS	Rec	Yds	Avg	Lng	TD	Att	Yds	Avg	Lng	TD	Fum	Lost
2023	LAC	**17**	2	**15**	66	4.4	18	0	**14**	**101**	**7.2**	**51**	0	**3**	**1**
2024	LAC	15	2	13	**112**	**8.6**	**23**	**2**	12	39	3.3	10	0	**3**	0
2025	LAC	11	0	2	10	5.0	7	0	2	5	2.5	3	0	1	**1**
Career		43	4	30	188	6.3	23	2	28	145	5.2	51	0	7	2
