= Phillip Brooks (gridiron football) =

American gridiron football player (born 1999)

Profile
- Positions: Wide receiver, return specialist

Personal information
- Born: September 19, 1999 (age 27); Overland Park, Kansas, U.S.
- Listed height: 5 ft 7 in (1.70 m)
- Listed weight: 171 lb (78 kg)

Career information
- High school: Lee's Summit West (Lee's Summit, Missouri)
- College: Kansas State (2018–2023)
- NFL draft: 2024: undrafted

Career history
- Kansas City Chiefs (2024)*; Hamilton Tiger-Cats (2025)*; BC Lions (2025); Hamilton Tiger-Cats (2025); Montreal Alouettes (2026)
- * Offseason or practice squad member only

Awards and highlights
- First-team All-Big 12 (2020); Second-team All-Big 12 (2022)
- Stats at CFL.ca

Phillip Brooks III (born September 19, 1999) is an American professional football wide receiver and return specialist. He most recently played for the Montreal Alouettes of the Canadian Football League (CFL). He played college football for the Kansas State Wildcats and was signed by the Chiefs as an undrafted free agent after the 2024 NFL draft.

== Early life ==
Brooks grew up in Lee's Summit, Missouri, and attended Lee's Summit West High School. In Brooks high school career he played as a running back rushing for 3,217 yards and 39 touchdowns on 478 carries, while also hauling in 66 receptions for 1,012 yards and 13 touchdowns, and also returning two punts for touchdowns. On defense he played some cornerback notching 14 tackles with one going for a loss, two sacks, a pass deflection, and two fumble recoveries. Brooks would decide to commit to play college football at Kansas State.

== College career ==
In Brook's first season in 2018, he played mainly as a kick returner, returning three kick for 56 yards. In week thirteen of the 2019 season, Brooks caught two passes for 20 yards and his first career touchdown, as he would help the Wildcats beat Texas Tech 30–27. In the 2019 Liberty Bowl, Brooks would record the first touchdown of the game for Kansas State, taking a punt 66 yards for a touchdown, but the Wildcats would fall to Navy 20–17. Brooks would finish the 2019 season with 26 receptions for 253 yards and a touchdown, while also rushing for 26 yards. Brooks would also return 12 kickoffs for 272 yards and eight punts for 120 yards and a touchdown. In week six of the 2020 season, Brooks would have an amazing performance, returning four punts for 189 yards and two touchdowns, as he helped the Wildcats destroy Kansas 55–14. The 189 punt return yards would be a record, of the most punt return yards by a Kansas State player in a single game. For his performance on the week, Brooks would be named the Big-12 special teams player of the week. Brooks would finish the 2020 season with 15 receptions for 155 yards and two touchdowns, while also rushing for 41 yards. Brooks would also return eight kickoffs for 150 yards and 11 punts for 261 yards and two touchdowns. For his performance on the season, Brooks would be named First Team All Big-12, and Third Team All American by Phil Steele, as a punt returner. In week five of the 2021 season, Brooks would have a good game hauling in six passes for 55 yards and a touchdown, but it would not be enough as Kansas State would lose against #6 Oklahoma 37–31. Brooks would finish the 2021 season with 43 receptions for 543 yards and two touchdowns. Brooks would also return four kickoffs for 62 yards and eight punts for 84 yards. In week two of the 2022 season, Brooks would have another great game returning a punt 76 yards for a touchdown, as he would help the Wildcats beat Missouri 40–12. For his performance on the week versus Missouri, Brooks would be named the Big-12 special teams player of the week. In week six, Brooks would have another gret game bring in four passes for 119 yards and a touchdown, as he would help Kansas State hang on to beat Iowa State 10–9. Brooks would finish the 2022 season with 45 receptions for 587 yards and four touchdowns, while also rushing for 29 yards. Brooks would also return 10 kickoffs for 182 yards and 14 punts for 168 yards and a touchdown. For his performance on the season, Brooks would be named Second Team All Big-12 as a punt returner. Ahead of the upcoming 2023 season, Brooks would be named preseason First Team All Big-12 as a punt returner. Brooks would also be named a fourth team preseason All-American by Athlon Sports, and to the Paul Hornung Award watch list which is awarded to the nation's most versatile player.

== Professional career ==
Pre-draft measurables
Height	Weight	Arm length	Hand span	Wingspan	40-yard dash	10-yard split	20-yard split	20-yard shuttle	Three-cone drill	Vertical jump	Broad jump
5 ft 6 7/8 in (1.70 m)	175 lb (79 kg)	29 in (0.74 m)	9 1/8 in (0.23 m)	5 ft 11 1/8 in (1.81 m)	4.51 s	1.53 s	2.55 s	4.02 s	6.75 s	37.0 in (0.94 m)	10 ft 4 in (3.15 m)
All values from Pro Day

=== Kansas City Chiefs ===
Brooks was signed by the Kansas City Chiefs as an undrafted free agent after the 2024 NFL draft. He was waived on August 26.

=== Hamilton Tiger-Cats (first stint) ===
On March 5, 2025, Brooks signed with the Hamilton Tiger-Cats of the Canadian Football League (CFL). He was released as part of the Tiger-Cats final roster cuts on June 1, 2025.

=== BC Lions ===
On June 25, 2025, Brooks was signed to the practice roster of the BC Lions. On June 26, 2025, Brooks was added to the Lions' active roster. He was reassigned to the practice roster on July 4, 2025. He was released on July 17, 2025.

=== Hamilton Tiger-Cats (second stint) ===
On September 4, 2025, it was announced that Brooks had re-signed with the Tiger-Cats. He was released on October 9, 2025.

=== Montreal Alouettes ===
On January 19, 2026, Brooks signed with the Montreal Alouettes. He played in the first two games of the 2026 season where he had eight punt returns for 59 yards and six kickoff returns for 140 yards. He was later released on June 16, 2026.
