= Aubrey Burks =

American football player (born 2002)

No. 2
- Position: Safety

Personal information
- Born: March 22, 2002 (age 24); Oak Ridge, Florida
- Listed height: 5 ft 11 in (1.80 m)
- Listed weight: 209 lb (95 kg)

Career information
- High school: Auburndale (Auburndale, Florida)
- College: West Virginia (2021–2024)

Awards and highlights
- Second-team All-Big 12 (2022)
- Stats at ESPN

Aubrey Burks (born March 22, 2002) is an American college football safety who played for the West Virginia Mountaineers.

== Early life ==
Burks attended Auburndale High School in Auburndale, Florida. As a junior, he recorded 63 tackles, six sacks, three forced fumbles, and two interceptions before committing to Indiana. However, as a senior, Burks decommitted and instead chose to play college football at West Virginia University over offers from Georgia Tech, Louisville, and Mississippi State.

== College career ==
After just recording two tackles as a freshman, Burks became a starter as a sophomore, finishing the season with 66 tackles, an interception, a forced fumble, and a sack. Against TCU the following season, a collision left Burks motionless on the field for around eight minutes before he was stabilized and carted off the field. After being hospitalized and flown home, Burks was able to return to action after missing a few weeks. He ended his junior season with 48 tackles, two interceptions, and two pass deflections. Entering the 2024 season, Burks is considered one of the top returning safeties in college football. Against Kansas, he suffered an upper body injury, having to be stretchered off the field and put in a neck brace, before being taken to a local hospital. Following the conclusion of the game, Burks was able to return to the stadium and participate in the Mountaineer's post-game celebration, following a 32–28 victory.
