= Felix Anudike-Uzomah =

American football player (born 2002)

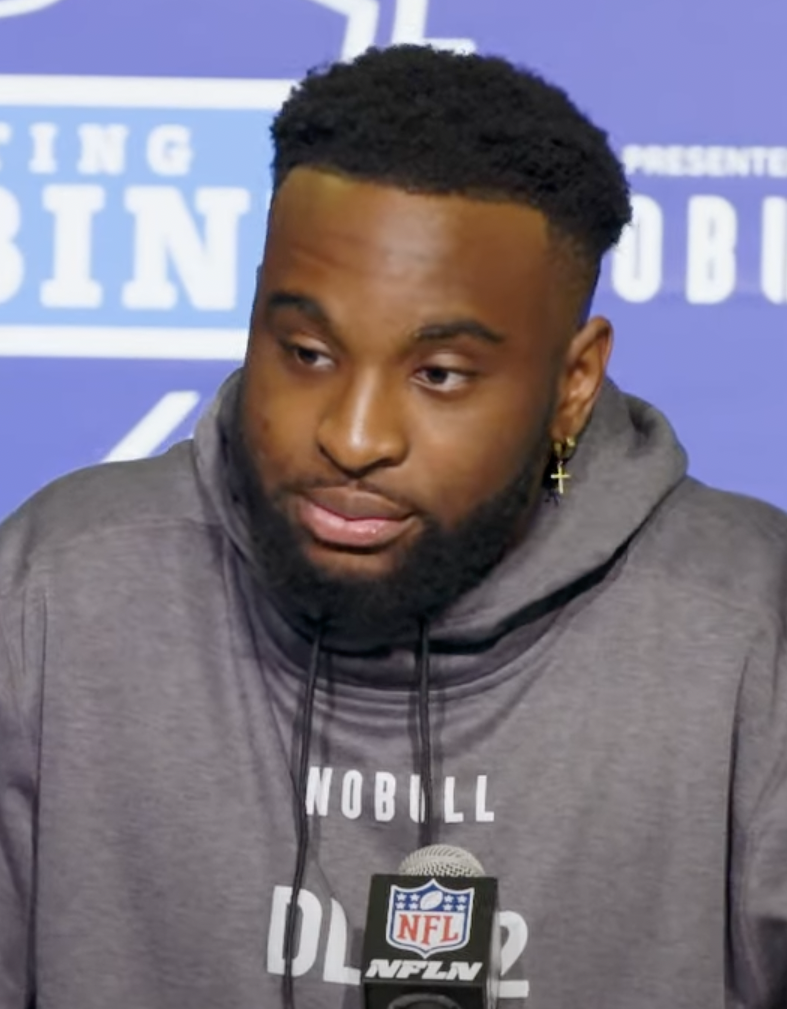
- Anudike-Uzomah at the 2023 NFL Combine

No. 91 – Kansas City Chiefs
- Position: Defensive end
- Roster status: Active

Personal information
- Born: January 24, 2002 (age 24); Kansas City, Missouri, U.S.
- Listed height: 6 ft 4 in (1.93 m)
- Listed weight: 255 lb (116 kg)

Career information
- High school: Lee's Summit (Lee's Summit, Missouri)
- College: Kansas State (2020–2022)
- NFL draft: 2023: 1st round, 31st overall pick

Career history
- Kansas City Chiefs (2023–present)

Awards and highlights
- Super Bowl champion (LVIII); First-team All-American (2022); Big 12 Defensive Player of the Year (2022); 2× Big 12 Defensive Lineman of the Year (2021, 2022); 2× first-team All-Big 12 (2021, 2022)

Career NFL statistics as of Week 7, 2026
- Total tackles: 50
- Sacks: 4
- Forced fumbles: 3
- Fumble recoveries: 1
- Stats at Pro Football Reference

Felix Anudike-Uzomah (born January 24, 2002) is an American professional football defensive end for the Kansas City Chiefs of the National Football League (NFL). He played college football for the Kansas State Wildcats, earning Big 12 Defensive Player of the Year honors in 2022. He was selected by the Chiefs with the 31st overall pick in the first round of the 2023 NFL draft.

== Early life ==
Anudike-Uzomah was born on January 24, 2002, in Kansas City, Missouri. He attended Lee's Summit High School in Lee's Summit, Missouri. He is of Nigerian descent.

== College career ==
Anudike-Uzomah finished his freshman season at Kansas State with three tackles and one sack. He was named a starter going into his sophomore season. Anudike-Uzomah set a school record with four sacks, including two strip sacks, against TCU and was named the National Defensive Player of the Week by the Walter Camp Football Foundation. He was originally credited with six sacks, which would have tied the NCAA record, but it was ruled that the two forced fumbles went beyond the line of scrimmage and therefore qualified as rushing attempts. Anudike-Uzomah was named the Big 12 Conference's co-Defensive Lineman of the Year and was included on the all-conference team.

== Professional career ==
Pre-draft measurables
Height	Weight	Arm length	Hand span	Wingspan	20-yard shuttle	Three-cone drill	Vertical jump	Broad jump
6 ft 3 1/8 in (1.91 m)	255 lb (116 kg)	33 1/2 in (0.85 m)	9 5/8 in (0.24 m)	6 ft 8 1/8 in (2.04 m)	4.34 s	6.94 s	34.0 in (0.86 m)	10 ft 4 in (3.15 m)
All values from NFL Combine/Pro Day

Anudike-Uzomah was selected by the Kansas City Chiefs in the first round with the 31st pick of the 2023 NFL draft. Anudike-Uzomah's rookie season ended with 14 tackles, 0.5 sacks, and one fumble recovery. The Chiefs reached Super Bowl LVIII where they defeated the San Francisco 49ers 25–22. Anudike-Uzomah had one tackle in the game, which resulted in a four-yard loss.

On August 18, 2025, Anudike-Uzomah was placed on season-ending injured reserve with a hamstring injury.

On May 1, 2026, the Chiefs declined the fifth-year option on Anudike-Uzomah's contract, making him a free agent after the 2026 season.

== NFL career statistics ==
Legend
	Won the Super Bowl
**Bold**	Career high

=== Regular season ===
Year	Team	Games		Tackles				Fumbles				Interceptions					
Year	Team	GP	GS	Cmb	Solo	Ast	Sck	FF	FR	Yds	TD	Int	Yds	Avg	Lng	TD	PD
2023	KC	**17**	0	14	8	6	0.5	**1**	0	0	0	0	0	0.0	0	0	0
2024	KC	**17**	3	**27**	**16**	**11**	**2.5**	1	**1**	0	0	0	0	0.0	0	0	0
2025	KC	0	0	—	DNP												
2026	KC	4	**4**	5	3	2	1.0	1	0	0	0	0	0	0.0	0	0	0
Career		38	7	46	27	19	4.0	3	1	0	0	0	0	0.0	0	0	0

=== Postseason ===
Year	Team	Games		Tackles				Fumbles				Interceptions					
Year	Team	GP	GS	Cmb	Solo	Ast	Sck	FF	FR	Yds	TD	Int	Yds	Avg	Lng	TD	PD
2023	KC	**1**	0	1	1	0	0.0	0	0	0	0	0	0	0.0	0	0	0
2024	KC	**1**	0	**2**	**2**	0	**1.0**	0	0	0	0	0	0	0.0	0	0	0
Career		2	0	3	3	0	1.0	0	0	0	0	0	0	0.0	0	0	0
