= Johnny Hodges (American football) =

American football player (born 2000)

Profile
- Position: Linebacker

Personal information
- Born: September 6, 2000 (age 26)
- Listed height: 6 ft 2 in (1.88 m)
- Listed weight: 240 lb (109 kg)

Career information
- High school: Quince Orchard (Gaithersburg, Maryland)
- College: Navy (2020–2021); TCU (2022–2024)
- NFL draft: 2025: undrafted

Career history
- Winnipeg Blue Bombers (2026)*
- * Offseason or practice squad member only

Awards and highlights
- Big 12 Newcomer of the Year (2022); Second-team All-Big 12 (2022)

Johnny Hodges (born September 6, 2000) is an American professional football linebacker. He played college football for the Navy Midshipmen and TCU Horned Frogs.

== Early life ==
Hodges grew up in Darnestown, Maryland and attended Quince Orchard High School, where he played basketball, football, and lacrosse. He committed to play college lacrosse at the United States Naval Academy.

== College career ==
Hodges played lacrosse for Navy as a freshman and played in one game before the season was canceled due to the COVID-19 pandemic in the United States. He joined the Navy football entering the 2020 season and played in seven games. Hodges played in nine games during his sophomore season and recorded 50 tackles with one tackle for loss, one sack, one interception, 4 passes defended, and a forced fumble. Following the end of the season, he entered the NCAA transfer portal.

Hodges ultimately transferred to TCU. He became a starter at linebacker during his first season with the team. Hodges was named the Big 12 Conference Newcomer of the Year and second-team All-Conference at the end of the regular season.

== Professional career ==
Pre-draft measurables
Height	Weight	40-yard dash	20-yard shuttle	Three-cone drill	Vertical jump	Broad jump	Bench press
6 ft 0 in (1.83 m)	237 lb (108 kg)	4.74 s	4.32 s	7.03 s	30.5 in (0.77 m)	9 ft 4 in (2.84 m)	28 reps
All values from Pro Day

Hodges received an invitation to the Los Angeles Chargers rookie minicamp.

On November 21, 2025, Hodges signed to play for the Winnipeg Blue Bombers of the Canadian Football League (CFL). He was released on May 10.
