= Brayden Willis =

American football player (born 1999)

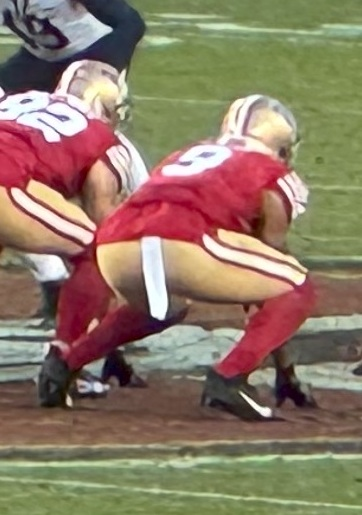
- Willis with the San Francisco 49ers in 2024

No. 9 – San Francisco 49ers
- Position: Tight end
- Roster status: Active

Personal information
- Born: November 11, 1999 (age 26); Dallas, Texas, U.S.
- Listed height: 6 ft 4 in (1.93 m)
- Listed weight: 240 lb (109 kg)

Career information
- High school: Martin (Arlington, Texas)
- College: Oklahoma (2018–2022)
- NFL draft: 2023: 7th round, 247th overall pick

Career history
- San Francisco 49ers (2023–present)

Awards and highlights
- Second-team All-Big 12 (2022)

Career NFL statistics as of 2025
- Tackles: 10
- Stats at Pro Football Reference

Brayden Willis (born November 11, 1999) is an American professional football tight end for the San Francisco 49ers of the National Football League (NFL). He played college football for the Oklahoma Sooners and was selected by the 49ers in the seventh round of the 2023 NFL draft.

== Early life ==
Willis grew up in Arlington, Texas and attended Martin High School. He was rated a three-star recruit and committed to play college football at Oklahoma.

== College career ==
Willis played college football for the Oklahoma Sooners for five seasons. He caught 15 passes for 177 yards and two touchdowns as a senior. Willis decided to use the extra year of eligibility granted to college athletes in 2020 due to the COVID-19 pandemic and returned to Oklahoma for a fifth season. In his final season, Willis had 39 receptions for 514 yards and seven touchdowns.

== Professional career ==
Pre-draft measurables
| Height | Weight | Arm length | Hand span | Wingspan | 20-yard shuttle | Three-cone drill | Vertical jump | Broad jump | Bench press |
|---|---|---|---|---|---|---|---|---|---|
| 6 ft 3 1/2 in (1.92 m) | 241 lb (109 kg) | 33 1/4 in (0.84 m) | 9 3/4 in (0.25 m) | 6 ft 7 1/8 in (2.01 m) | 4.36 s | 7.30 s | 33.5 in (0.85 m) | 9 ft 10 in (3.00 m) | 20 reps |
All values from NFL Combine/Pro Day

Willis was selected by the San Francisco 49ers in the seventh round (247th overall) of the 2023 NFL draft. On August 27, 2024, he was waived by the 49ers, but was re-signed to the practice squad the next day. Willis was promoted to the active roster on October 8.

On April 22, 2025, Willis re-signed with the 49ers. He was waived on August 26 as part of final roster cuts, but was re-signed to the practice squad the next day. On September 17, Willis was promoted to the active roster. He was waived on October 18, but was re-signed to the practice squad the next day. On January 13, 2026, Willis was promoted to the active roster.

On September 5, 2026, Willis was waived by the 49ers and re-signed to the practice squad. He was promoted to the active roster on September 15.

== NFL career statistics ==
Legend
| **Bold** | Career high |

=== Regular season ===
| Year | Team | Games | | Tackles | | | | | Interceptions | | | | | | Fumbles | | | | |
| Year | Team | GP | GS | Cmb | Solo | Ast | Sck | TFL | Int | Yds | Avg | Lng | TD | PD | FF | Fum | FR | Yds | TD |
|---|---|---|---|---|---|---|---|---|---|---|---|---|---|---|---|---|---|---|---|
| 2023 | SF | 7 | 0 | 1 | 1 | 0 | 0.0 | 0 | 0 | 0 | 0.0 | 0 | 0 | 0 | 0 | 0 | 0 | 0 | 0 |
| 2024 | SF | **10** | 0 | 3 | 1 | 2 | 0.0 | 0 | 0 | 0 | 0.0 | 0 | 0 | 0 | 0 | 0 | 0 | 0 | 0 |
| 2025 | SF | 6 | 0 | **6** | **3** | **3** | 0.0 | 0 | 0 | 0 | 0.0 | 0 | 0 | 0 | 0 | 0 | 0 | 0 | 0 |
| Career | | 23 | 0 | 10 | 5 | 5 | 0.0 | 0 | 0 | 0 | 0.0 | 0 | 0 | 0 | 0 | 0 | 0 | 0 | 0 |

=== Postseason ===
| Year | Team | Games | | Tackles | | | | | Interceptions | | | | | | Fumbles | | | | |
| Year | Team | GP | GS | Cmb | Solo | Ast | Sck | TFL | Int | Yds | Avg | Lng | TD | PD | FF | Fum | FR | Yds | TD |
|---|---|---|---|---|---|---|---|---|---|---|---|---|---|---|---|---|---|---|---|
| 2023 | SF | **3** | 0 | **1** | 0 | **1** | 0.0 | 0 | 0 | 0 | 0.0 | 0 | 0 | 0 | 0 | 0 | 0 | 0 | 0 |
| 2025 | SF | 1 | 0 | 0 | 0 | 0 | 0.0 | 0 | 0 | 0 | 0.0 | 0 | 0 | 0 | 0 | 0 | 0 | 0 | 0 |
| Career | | 4 | 0 | 1 | 0 | 1 | 0.0 | 0 | 0 | 0 | 0.0 | 0 | 0 | 0 | 0 | 0 | 0 | 0 | 0 |
