= Steve Avila =

American football player (born 1999)

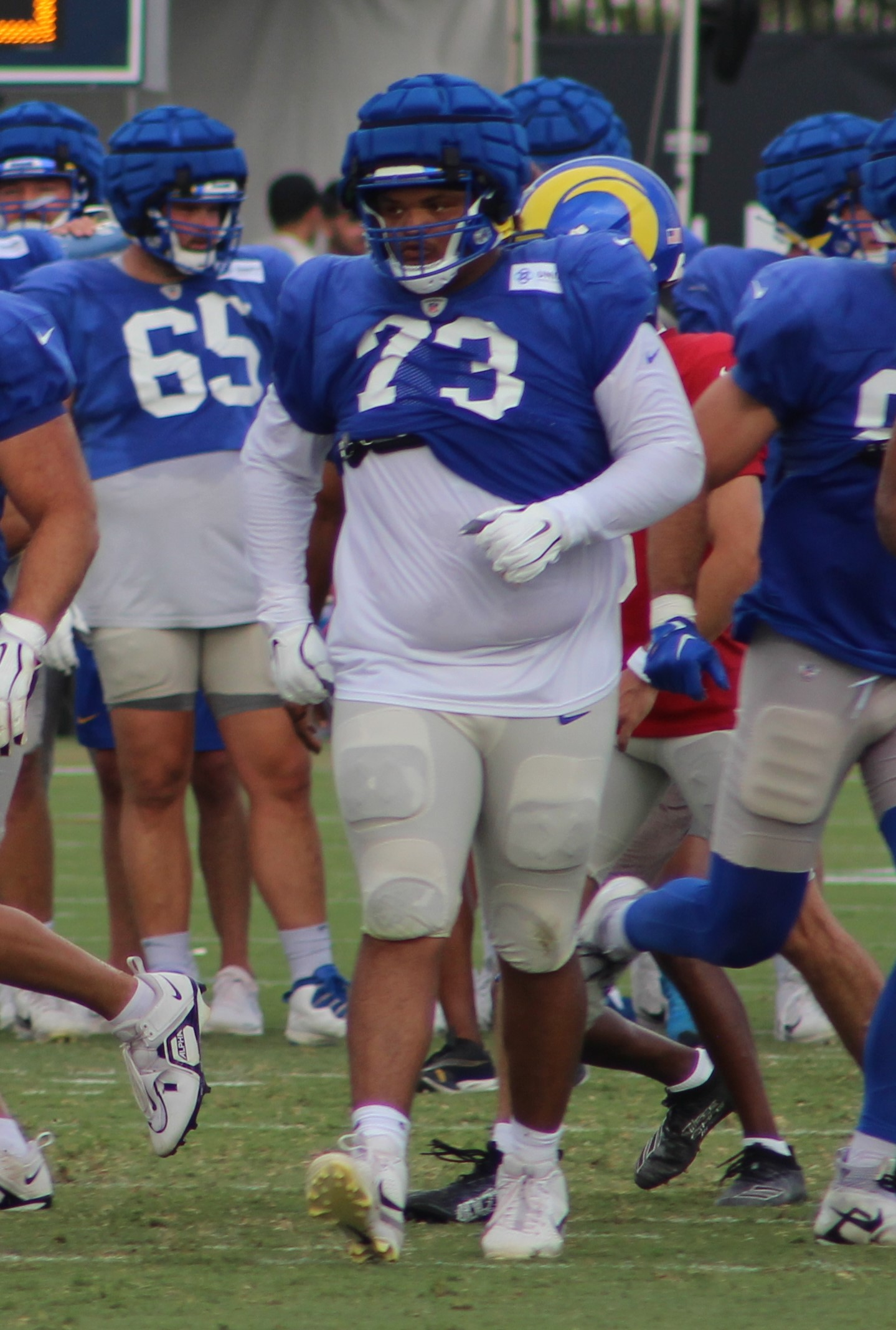
- Avila with the Los Angeles Rams in 2023

No. 73 – Los Angeles Rams
- Position: Guard
- Roster status: Active

Personal information
- Born: October 16, 1999 (age 27); Arlington, Texas, U.S.
- Listed height: 6 ft 3 in (1.91 m)
- Listed weight: 332 lb (151 kg)

Career information
- High school: South Grand Prairie (Grand Prairie, Texas)
- College: TCU (2018–2022)
- NFL draft: 2023: 2nd round, 36th overall pick

Career history
- Los Angeles Rams (2023–present)

Awards and highlights
- PFWA All-Rookie Team (2023); Consensus All-American (2022); 2× First-team All-Big 12 (2021, 2022)

Career NFL statistics as of Week 1, 2026
- Games played: 43
- Games started: 41
- Stats at Pro Football Reference

Esteban "Steve" Avila (/ɑːvilɑː/ AH-vee-lah; born October 16, 1999) is an American professional football guard for the Los Angeles Rams of the National Football League (NFL). He played college football for the TCU Horned Frogs.

== Early life ==
Avila was born on October 16, 1999, in Arlington, Texas, and attended South Grand Prairie High School. Avila was rated a four-star recruit and committed to play college football at Texas Christian University. His father is Mexican-American, and his mother is African-American.

== College career ==
Avila redshirted for the TCU Horned Frogs as a freshman. He played in 11 games as a redshirt freshman. Avila started nine games during his redshirt sophomore season with six at center, two at right tackle, and one at guard and earned honorable mention All-Big 12 Conference honors. As a junior, Avila started 11 games at center and was named first team All-Big 12 Conference by the Associated Press and to the second team by the league's coaches. In 2022, Avila started all 15 games at left guard and helped lead the Horned Frogs to a 13-2 record which included Big 12 Conference title, a victory in the Vrbo Fiesta Bowl and a spot in the CFP National Championship. Avila was named a consensus All-American, an Outland Trophy semifinalist, and all-conference first team for the second straight season as well as honorable mention Big 12 Lineman of the Year.

== Professional career ==
Pre-draft measurables
Height	Weight	Arm length	Hand span	Wingspan	40-yard dash	10-yard split	20-yard split	20-yard shuttle	Three-cone drill	Vertical jump	Broad jump	Bench press
6 ft 3 1/2 in (1.92 m)	332 lb (151 kg)	33 in (0.84 m)	9 1/4 in (0.23 m)	6 ft 6 in (1.98 m)	5.21 s	1.86 s	2.97 s	4.74 s	7.85 s	29.5 in (0.75 m)	8 ft 2 in (2.49 m)	28 reps
All values from NFL Combine

Avila was selected by the Los Angeles Rams in the second round (36th overall) of the 2023 NFL draft. In his rookie year, Avila started all 17 regular season games and one postseason game at left guard, and was the only Rams player to have played every snap on offense. He was named to the PFWA All-Rookie Team.

With the addition of guard Jonah Jackson in 2024, Avila moved from left guard to center, which was his natural position in college. Avila suffered a knee injury in the week 1 loss against the Detroit Lions and was placed on injured reserve on September 11, 2024, after it was determined he would require MCL surgery. Avila returned to left guard after he was activated on November 11, and started the team's final nine games of the regular season as well as two games in the postseason. He remained at left guard to begin the 2025 season. Avila suffered an ankle sprain in the Rams' 14-9 season-opening victory over the Houston Texans which sidelined him for two games and he saw limited action in two others before returning to the starting lineup in Week 6 during a 17-3 win over the Baltimore Ravens, where he remained throughout the regular season.
