= Michael Turk =

American football player (born 1998)

Profile
- Position: Punter

Personal information
- Born: March 14, 1998 (age 28); Davie, Florida, U.S.
- Listed height: 6 ft 0 in (1.83 m)
- Listed weight: 231 lb (105 kg)

Career information
- High school: Ridge Point (Sienna, Texas)
- College: Lafayette (2017); Arizona State (2018–2020); Oklahoma (2021–2022)
- NFL draft: 2023: undrafted

Career history
- Miami Dolphins (2023)*
- * Offseason or practice squad member only

Awards and highlights
- Second-team All-Patriot League (2017); 2× First-team All-Pac-12 (2019, 2020); 2× First-team All-Big 12 (2021, 2022)
- Stats at Pro Football Reference

Michael Matthew-Paul Turk (born March 14, 1998) is an American professional football punter and Youtuber. He played college football for the Lafayette Leopards, Oklahoma Sooners, and Arizona State Sun Devils. Despite declaring for the 2020 NFL draft, he regained two years of eligibility after not being selected and not being signed following the draft. After playing for two years at Oklahoma, he declared for the 2023 NFL draft and signed with the Miami Dolphins as an undrafted free agent, before being waived prior to the pre-season.

Hangtime
- Spouse: Grace Turk (m. 2023)
- Children: 2

YouTube information
- Channels: Hangtime; HangOn; michaelturk9175
- Years active: 2020–present
- Genre: Sports
- Subscribers: 4.07 million
- Views: 1.16 billion
- Last updated: October 24, 2026

== Early life ==
Turk attended Ridge Point High School, where he played safety, contributing to the school winning the 6A Region Championship in 2014 and 2015. In less than three years, Turk suffered three ACL tears, which hampered his ability to become a safety at the next level.

After graduating, he took a year off to train with his brother, Ben Turk, a former punter for Notre Dame, during which he decided that he wanted to become a punter.

== College career ==
=== Lafayette ===
Turk accepted a football scholarship from Lafayette College. As a true freshman in 2017, where he registered over 2,800 punting yards and setting a school single-season record with an average of 42.7 yards per attempt. He received second-team All-Patriot League honors.

=== Arizona State ===
In 2018 after Turk's freshman season, he transferred to Arizona State University and was redshirted to comply with the NCAA transfer rules.

As a sophomore in 2019, against Kent State University, Turk recorded punts of 64, 62, 65, 49 and 75 yards, setting an NCAA single-game record with a 63.0-yard average per attempt. He earned honorable-mention All-American honors from GPR Analytics while ranking fourth in the nation with a 95.80 GPR Punt Rating.

On January 6, 2020, he opted to declare for the 2020 NFL draft. On June 3, 2020, after failing to be selected by a team, in an unprecedented decision, the NCAA restored Turk's remaining two years of eligibility and allowed him to return to Arizona State.

During Turk's junior year in 2020, Arizona State played only four games due to the COVID-19 pandemic. He registered a career-high 47.2-yard average on 14 punts and received first-team All-Pac-12 honors.

On August 5, 2021, Turk entered his name into the NCAA transfer portal, in part due to his opposition to Arizona State requiring the COVID-19 vaccine to travel to road games. On August 12, he announced that he would be transferring to the University of Oklahoma.

=== Oklahoma ===
As a senior in 2021, he appeared in 11 games, averaging 51.2 yards on 35 punts, with 16 punts downed inside 20-yard line. His 51.2-yard average would have ranked second nationally, but he did not have enough attempts to qualify. He received All-Big 12 honors. He had 20 punts that went over 50 yards and 8 that went over 60 yards. The team did not punt against Tulane University and Kansas State University. He had an 85-yard punt (tied for third in school history) and averaged 58 yards on three punts against the University of Texas.

As a super senior in 2022, he appeared in all 13 games, averaging 46.8 yards (ranked third nationally) on 63 punts, with 22 punts downed inside the 20-yard line. He received All-Big 12 honors. He had 22 punts that went over 50 yards and 6 that went at least 60 yards. He also completed two passes on fake field goals plays, which included a 3-yarder for a first down against the University of Texas and a 2-yarder for a touchdown against Iowa State University. He averaged 49.3 yards on 6 punts, including two critical punts of at least 60 yards in the fourth quarter against Iowa State University, earning Big 12 Co-Special Teams Player of the Week honors.

== Professional career ==
=== 2020 NFL Combine ===
Pre-draft measurables
Height	Weight	Arm length	Hand span	Wingspan	40-yard dash	10-yard split	20-yard split	20-yard shuttle	Vertical jump	Broad jump	Bench press
6 ft 0 1/2 in (1.84 m)	226 lb (103 kg)	31 1/8 in (0.79 m)	9 7/8 in (0.25 m)	6 ft 4 in (1.93 m)	4.79 s	1.68 s	2.78 s	4.72 s	34.5 in (0.88 m)	9 ft 0 in (2.74 m)	25 reps
All values from NFL Combine

On February 27, 2020, Turk set an NFL Scouting Combine record for punters, with 25 bench press repetitions of 225 pounds. Of those who participated, Turk's total bench reps were more than all 33 wide receivers, 12 out of 13 tight ends, with Josiah Deguara tying him, and 19 offensive lineman out of 34. His bench reps also tied for second among special teams participants since 2006.

=== 2023 NFL Combine ===
On March 3, 2023, Turk competed in his second NFL Combine in preparation for the 2023 NFL draft.

Pre-draft measurables
Height	Weight	Arm length	Hand span	Wingspan	40-yard dash	10-yard split	20-yard split	Vertical jump	Broad jump
6 ft 0 1/4 in (1.84 m)	227 lb (103 kg)	30 1/2 in (0.77 m)	10 1/8 in (0.26 m)	6 ft 4 3/8 in (1.94 m)	4.83 s	1.65 s	2.75 s	34 in (0.86 m)	9 ft 1 in (2.77 m)
All values from NFL Combine

=== Miami Dolphins ===
After going undrafted, Turk signed with the Miami Dolphins as an undrafted free agent on April 29, 2023. He was waived by the team in favor of Jake Bailey on August 2.

In November 2023, Turk worked out with the New England Patriots. Turk was not signed.

== Personal life ==
Turk's uncles are former NFL punter Matt Turk and former NFL long snapper Dan Turk. Turk has a YouTube channel called Hangtime, where he makes videos about his experience playing for Oklahoma, fitness, and his Baptist faith, often mentioning some of his favorite Bible verses. As of January 24, 2026, he has over 3,000,000 subscribers on his YouTube channel.

On November 19, 2022, he proposed to his now wife, Oklahoma Sooners softball All-American Grace Lyons, on the field following the Bedlam football game. The couple got married on June 23, 2023. They have one child, a daughter, born in 2025.
