= Kendal Daniels =

American football player (born 2002)

No. 53 – Atlanta Falcons
- Position: Linebacker
- Roster status: Active

Personal information
- Born: December 16, 2002 (age 23)
- Listed height: 6 ft 5 in (1.96 m)
- Listed weight: 242 lb (110 kg)

Career information
- High school: Beggs (Beggs, Oklahoma)
- College: Oklahoma State (2021–2024); Oklahoma (2025)
- NFL draft: 2026: 4th round, 134th overall pick

Career history
- Atlanta Falcons (2026–present)

Awards and highlights
- Second-team All-Big 12 (2022); Big 12 Defensive Freshman of the Year (2022)

Career NFL statistics as of Week 10, 2026
- Tackles: 69
- Sacks: 1
- Fumble recoveries: 1
- Pass deflections: 2
- Interceptions: 1
- Stats at Pro Football Reference

Kendal Daniels (born December 16, 2002) is an American professional football linebacker for the Atlanta Falcons of the National Football League (NFL). He played college football for the Oklahoma Sooners and transferred from the Oklahoma State Cowboys and was selected by the Falcons in the fourth round of the 2026 NFL draft.

== Early life ==
Daniels attended Beggs High School in Beggs, Oklahoma. He originally played basketball for Beggs, before joining the football team as a sophomore where played wide receiver and safety, leading the team to state semifinal appearances in his junior and senior seasons. Daniels made the 2021 All-American Bowl, although the game was not played due to COVID-19. Coming out of high school Daniels was ranked the nations 5th ranked safety recruit, and the top recruit in the state of Oklahoma. Despite being a highly rated prospect, the Oklahoma Sooners would rescind his offer late in the recruiting process. He originally committed to play college football at Texas A&M and would sign his National Letter of Intent (NLI) with the team before flipping his commitment to Oklahoma State, becoming the team's highest rated recruit in the 2021 class.

== College career ==
=== Oklahoma State ===
Daniels redshirted in 2021, appearing in three games and not recording any stats. In 2022, he would start at safety for the Cowboys, recording 45 tackles and three interceptions on the year. On October 22, he would have a game-sealing interception off of Texas quarterback Quinn Ewers with eight seconds left in the Cowboys 41–34 victory. In week 11, Daniels would be named the Big 12 newcomer of the week following recording 10 tackles, a forced fumble and interception against Iowa State. At the conclusion of the season he was named the Big 12 Defensive Freshman of the Year and a member of the all-conference second team.

On December 9, 2024, Daniels announced that he would enter the transfer portal.

=== Oklahoma ===
On January 6, 2025, Daniels announced that he would transfer to Oklahoma.

== Professional career ==
Pre-draft measurables
Height	Weight	Arm length	Hand span	Wingspan	40-yard dash	10-yard split	20-yard split	20-yard shuttle	Vertical jump
6 ft 5 in (1.96 m)	242 lb (110 kg)	32 1/2 in (0.83 m)	9 1/2 in (0.24 m)	6 ft 7 1/4 in (2.01 m)	4.76 s	1.70 s	2.81 s	4.37 s	29.5 in (0.75 m)
All values from NFL Combine/Pro Day

Daniels was selected by the Atlanta Falcons in the fourth round with the 134th overall pick in the 2026 NFL draft.
