= Dante Stills =

American football player (born 1999)

No. 55 – Arizona Cardinals
- Position: Defensive tackle
- Roster status: Active

Personal information
- Born: December 14, 1999 (age 26); Fairmont, West Virginia, U.S.
- Listed height: 6 ft 4 in (1.93 m)
- Listed weight: 300 lb (136 kg)

Career information
- High school: Fairmont Senior (WV)
- College: West Virginia (2018–2022)
- NFL draft: 2023: 6th round, 213th overall pick

Career history
- Arizona Cardinals (2023–present)

Awards and highlights
- First-team All-Big 12 (2022)

Career NFL statistics as of Week 5, 2026
- Tackles: 137
- Sacks: 9
- Forced fumbles: 1
- Fumble recoveries: 1
- Pass deflections: 3
- Stats at Pro Football Reference

Dante Stills (born December 14, 1999) is an American professional football defensive tackle for the Arizona Cardinals of the National Football League (NFL). He played college football for the West Virginia Mountaineers.

== College career ==
In 2018, Stills had his debut as a true freshman against Tennessee. At the end of the season he had 16 tackles for the year, three sacks, six tackles for loss and two forced fumbles (which was tied for the team lead. He was named by The Athletic and ESPN as a Freshman All-American.

In 12 games, Stills ended the 2019 season with 24 tackles, a forced fumble and a pass breakup and earned Second Team All-Big 12 Conference honors.

Stills started all 10 games in the shortened 2020 season his final year playing with his brother. He ended his junior season with 35 tackles, 1 fumble recovery, a blocked kick and two pass breakups. After the season he was named All-Big 12 Conference First Team by Pro Football Focus (PFF) and Phil Steele and All-Big 12 Conference Second Team by the Associated Press. Additionally he was a PFF All-American honorable mention.

In 2021, Stills decided to remain at West Virginia for an additional season instead of entering the NFL draft. He was also named a preseason All-American.

== Professional career ==
Pre-draft measurables
Height	Weight	Arm length	Hand span	Wingspan	40-yard dash	10-yard split	20-yard split	20-yard shuttle	Three-cone drill	Vertical jump	Broad jump	Bench press
6 ft 3 1/2 in (1.92 m)	286 lb (130 kg)	32 3/8 in (0.82 m)	9 5/8 in (0.24 m)	6 ft 6 in (1.98 m)	4.85 s	1.72 s	2.81 s	4.61 s	7.38 s	28.5 in (0.72 m)	9 ft 5 in (2.87 m)	26 reps
All values from NFL Combine/Pro Day

Stills was selected by the Arizona Cardinals in the sixth round with the 213th overall pick in the 2023 NFL draft. He played in 15 games with eight starts as a rookie, recording 47 tackles and 3.5 sacks.

== NFL career statistics ==
Legend
**Bold**	Career high

=== Regular season ===
Year	Team	Games		Tackles					Interceptions						Fumbles				
Year	Team	GP	GS	Cmb	Solo	Ast	Sck	TFL	Int	Yds	Avg	Lng	TD	PD	FF	Fmb	FR	Yds	TD
2023	ARI	15	8	**47**	18	**29**	3.5	**5**	0	0	0.0	0	0	0	0	0	**1**	0	0
2024	ARI	16	10	42	**20**	22	**4.5**	4	0	0	0.0	0	0	**1**	**1**	0	0	0	0
2025	ARI	17	3	34	17	17	0.0	2	0	0	0.0	0	0	**1**	0	0	0	0	0
2026	ARI	5	5	14	5	9	1.0	2	0	0	0.0	0	0	**1**	0	0	0	0	0
Career		53	26	137	60	77	9.0	13	0	0	0.0	0	0	3	1	0	1	0	0

== Personal life ==
His brother, Darius Stills, played with him on the Mountaineers defensive line. Their father, Gary Stills, starred at WVU, and played in the NFL for 10 years. Stills uncle, Ken Stills, and cousin, Kenny Stills also played in the NFL.
