= Tre Tomlinson =

American football player (born 2001)

Profile
- Position: Cornerback

Personal information
- Born: January 10, 2000 (age 26); Waco, Texas, U.S.
- Listed height: 5 ft 9 in (1.75 m)
- Listed weight: 177 lb (80 kg)

Career information
- High school: Midway (Waco)
- College: TCU (2019–2022)
- NFL draft: 2023: 6th round, 182nd overall pick

Career history
- Los Angeles Rams (2023–2024); San Francisco 49ers (2025)*
- * Offseason or practice squad member only

Awards and highlights
- Jim Thorpe Award (2022); First-team All-American (2022); 3× first-team All-Big 12 (2020–2022)

Career NFL statistics as of 2024
- Total tackles: 13
- Stats at Pro Football Reference

Tre'Vius Hodges-Tomlinson (born January 10, 2000) is an American professional football cornerback. He played college football for the TCU Horned Frogs, and received three all-conference honors during his time with TCU and won the Jim Thorpe Award in 2022.

== Early life ==
Tomlinson attended Midway High School in Waco, Texas. He committed to Texas Christian University (TCU) to play college football.

== College career ==
As a freshman at TCU in 2019, Tomlinson played in 12 games and had eight tackles. He became a starter in 2020, and started all 10 games, recording 26 tackles. In 12 games in 2021, he had 41 tackles, two interceptions and a touchdown. Tomlinson won the Jim Thorpe Award as a senior in 2022.

== Professional career ==
Pre-draft measurables
Height	Weight	Arm length	Hand span	Wingspan	40-yard dash	10-yard split	20-yard split	Vertical jump	Broad jump	Bench press
5 ft 7 5/8 in (1.72 m)	178 lb (81 kg)	29 in (0.74 m)	8 5/8 in (0.22 m)	5 ft 10 1/2 in (1.79 m)	4.41 s	1.50 s	2.48 s	39.0 in (0.99 m)	11 ft 0 in (3.35 m)	12 reps
All values from the NFL Combine

=== Los Angeles Rams ===
Tomlinson was selected by the Los Angeles Rams in the sixth round, 182nd overall, of the 2023 NFL draft. As a rookie, he appeared in 15 games in the 2023 season.

Tomlinson was placed on season-ending injured reserve on August 27, 2024.

On March 6, 2025, Tomlinson was waived by the Rams.

=== San Francisco 49ers ===
On March 7, 2025, Tomlinson was claimed off waivers by the San Francisco 49ers. He was waived on May 9 and reverted to injured reserve.

On April 30, 2026, Tomlinson was waived by the 49ers.

== Personal life ==
He is the nephew of Hall of Fame NFL running back LaDainian Tomlinson.
