= Jason Taylor II =

American football player (born 1999)

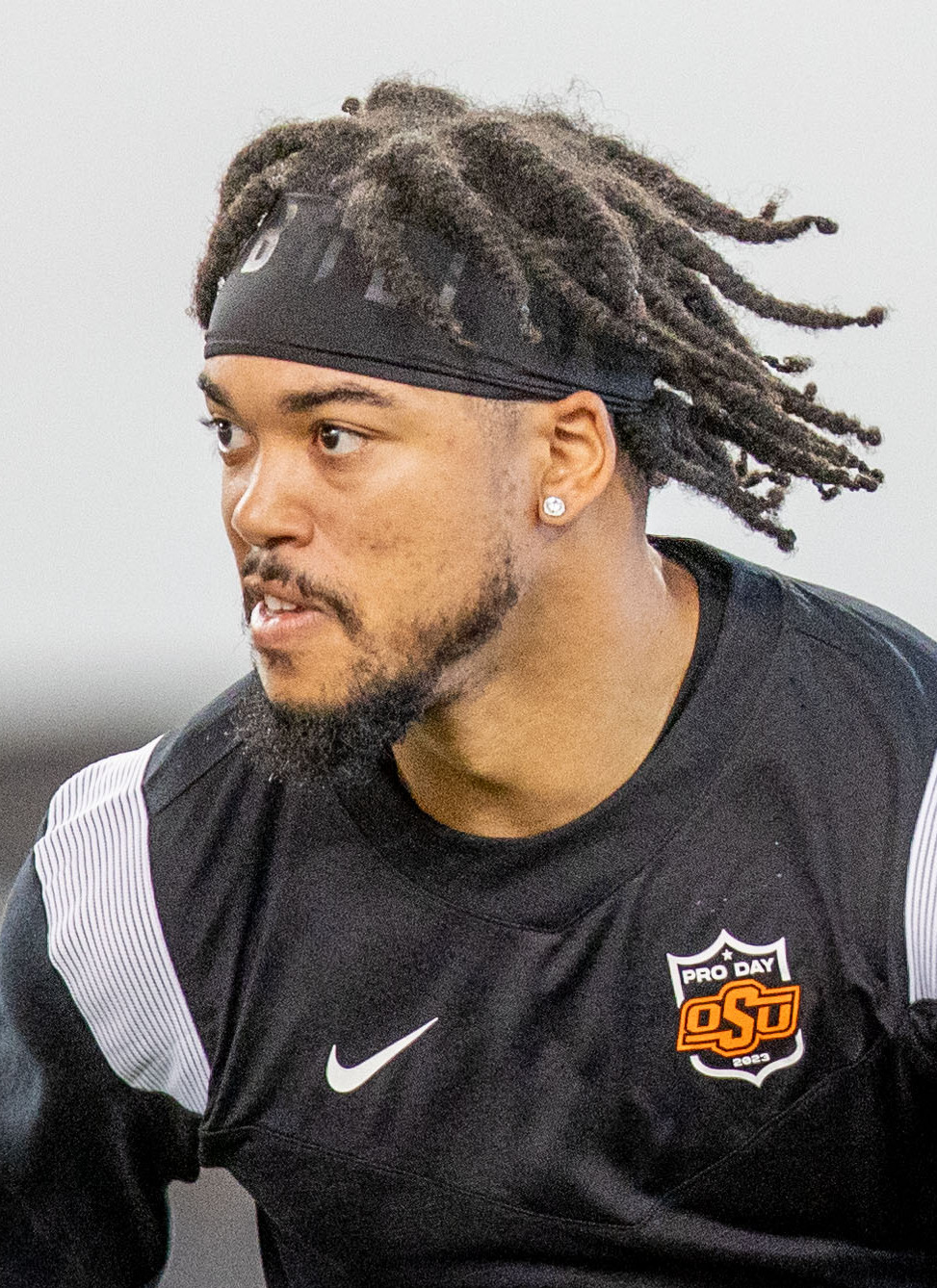
- Taylor at OSU Pro Day in 2023

Profile
- Position: Safety

Personal information
- Born: December 30, 1999 (age 26); Oklahoma City, Oklahoma, U.S.
- Listed height: 6 ft 0 in (1.83 m)
- Listed weight: 203 lb (92 kg)

Career information
- High school: Carl Albert (Midwest City, Oklahoma)
- College: Oklahoma State (2018–2022)
- NFL draft: 2023: 7th round, 234th overall pick

Career history
- Los Angeles Rams (2023–2024); Arizona Cardinals (2024)*; Kansas City Chiefs (2025)*; Orlando Storm (2026); Detroit Lions (2026)*
- * Offseason or practice squad member only

Awards and highlights
- Second-team All-American (2022); First-team All-Big 12 (2022)

Career NFL statistics as of 2024
- Total tackles: 5
- Stats at Pro Football Reference

Jason Taylor II (born December 30, 1999) is an American professional football safety. He played college football for the Oklahoma State Cowboys. Taylor was selected by the Los Angeles Rams in the seventh round of the 2023 NFL Draft.

== Early life ==
Taylor was born and grew up in Oklahoma City, Oklahoma and attended Carl Albert High School. He was named the state Defensive Player of the Year by The Oklahoman as a senior after intercepting nine passes. Taylor committed to play college football at Oklahoma State over offers from Tulsa and SMU.

== College career ==
Taylor played in three games during his true freshman season at Oklahoma State before redshirting the year. He played primarily on special teams as a redshirt freshman. Taylor became a starter one game into his redshirt junior season following an injury to first-string safety Tre Sterling. He was named honorable mention All-Big 12 Conference at the end of the season after recording 48 tackles with 2.5 sacks, one forced fumble, four passes defended and two interceptions, one of which was returned for a touchdown. Taylor made 99 tackles with six interceptions as a redshirt senior and was named first team All-Big 12 and a second team All-American by the Walter Camp Football Foundation. After the season he announced that he would enter the 2023 NFL draft.

== Professional career ==
Pre-draft measurables
Height	Weight	Arm length	Hand span	Wingspan	40-yard dash	10-yard split	20-yard split	20-yard shuttle	Three-cone drill	Vertical jump	Broad jump	Bench press
5 ft 11 5/8 in (1.82 m)	204 lb (93 kg)	32 in (0.81 m)	10 in (0.25 m)	6 ft 6 1/4 in (1.99 m)	4.50 s	1.52 s	2.55 s	4.20 s	7.16 s	43.0 in (1.09 m)	10 ft 9 in (3.28 m)	14 reps
All values from NFL Combine/Pro Day

=== Los Angeles Rams ===
Taylor was selected by the Los Angeles Rams in the seventh round, 234th overall, of the 2023 NFL draft. He was placed on injured reserve on September 15, 2023, and later activated on November 25.

Taylor was waived by the Rams on August 27, 2024, and re-signed to the practice squad. He was released on September 10.

=== Arizona Cardinals ===
On September 17. 2024, Taylor signed with the Arizona Cardinals practice squad. He was released on October 29.

=== Kansas City Chiefs ===
On January 9, 2025, Taylor signed a reserve/future contract with the Kansas City Chiefs. On May 1, Taylor was waived by the Chiefs.

=== Orlando Storm ===
On January 14, 2026, Taylor was selected by the Orlando Storm in the 2026 UFL Draft. He was released by Orlando on March 19. Taylor was re-signed on April 28.

=== Detroit Lions ===
On August 24, 2026, Taylor signed with the Detroit Lions. On August 30, he was waived by the Lions as a part of final roster cuts.

== NFL career statistics ==
=== Regular season ===
Year	Team	Games		Tackles					Interceptions						Fumbles	
Year	Team	GP	GS	Cmb	Solo	Ast	Sck	Sfty	PD	Int	Yds	Avg	Lng	TD	FF	FR
2023	LAR	8	0	5	5	0	0	0	0	0	0	0.0	0	0	0	0
Career		8	0	5	5	0	0.0	0	0	0	0	0	0	0	0	0
