= Lonnie Phelps =

American football player (born 2000)

No. 47 – Louisville Kings
- Position: Defensive end
- Roster status: Active

Personal information
- Born: August 24, 2000 (age 26); Cincinnati, Ohio, U.S.
- Listed height: 6 ft 2 in (1.88 m)
- Listed weight: 241 lb (109 kg)

Career information
- High school: Mount Healthy (OH)
- College: Miami (OH) (2019–2021); Kansas (2022)
- NFL draft: 2023: undrafted

Career history
- Cleveland Browns (2023–2024)*; San Antonio Brahmas (2025); Houston Roughnecks / Gamblers (2025–2026); Louisville Kings (2026–present)
- * Offseason or practice squad member only

Awards and highlights
- UFL champion (2026); Second-team All-Big 12 (2022); Second-team All-MAC (2021); Third-team All-MAC (2020)
- Stats at Pro Football Reference

Lonnie Phelps Jr. (born August 24, 2000) is an American professional football defensive end for the Louisville Kings of the United Football League (UFL). He played college football for the Miami RedHawks and Kansas Jayhawks.

== Early life ==
Phelps grew up in Cincinnati, Ohio, and attended Mount Healthy High School. He was rated a two-star recruit and committed to play college football for the Miami Redhawks of Miami University in Oxford, Ohio.

== College career ==
Phelps played in all 13 of the RedHawks' games as a freshman and had 4.5 sacks. Phelps was named third-team All-Mid-American Conference (MAC) at the end of his sophomore season. He was named second-team All-MAC as a junior after finishing the season with 13.5 tackles for loss and 9.5 sacks. Phelps entered the NCAA transfer portal at the end of the season.

Phelps ultimately transferred to Kansas. He had seven sacks and was named second-team All-Big 12 Conference in 2022. After the season Phelps announced that he would enter the 2023 NFL draft.

== Professional career ==
Pre-draft measurables
Height	Weight	Arm length	Hand span	Wingspan	40-yard dash	10-yard split	20-yard split	20-yard shuttle	Three-cone drill	Vertical jump	Broad jump	Bench press
6 ft 2 3/8 in (1.89 m)	244 lb (111 kg)	32 3/8 in (0.82 m)	9 1/4 in (0.23 m)	6 ft 3 3/8 in (1.91 m)	4.55 s	1.62 s	2.65 s	4.51 s	7.28 s	34.0 in (0.86 m)	9 ft 11 in (3.02 m)	31 reps
All values from NFL Combine/Pro Day

=== Cleveland Browns ===
Phelps went undrafted and was signed by the Cleveland Browns as a free agent on May 12, 2023. He was waived on August 29, 2023, and signed to the practice squad the following day.

He signed a reserve/future contract with the team on January 15, 2024. On June 20, 2024, Phelps was waived by the Browns following a recent DUI arrest.

=== San Antonio Brahmas ===
On February 22, 2025, Phelps signed with the San Antonio Brahmas of the United Football League (UFL). He was released on May 12, 2025.

=== Houston Roughnecks/Gamblers ===
On May 27, 2025, Phelps signed with the Houston Roughnecks of the United Football League (UFL). He was released on March 19, 2026, but was re-signed on April 1.

=== Louisville Kings ===
On May 4, 2026, Phelps was traded to he Louisville Kings in exchange for JaVonta Payton.

== Personal life ==
On June 19, 2024, Phelps was arrested for driving under the influence in Key West, Florida, after he crashed his SUV into a restaurant and refused to cooperate with police afterwards.
