= 2021 Big 12 Conference football season =

American college football season

- League: NCAA Division I FBS football season
- Sport: football
- Duration: September 4, 2021; January 4, 2022
- Teams: 10
- TV partner(s): Fox Family (Fox, FS1, FSN), ESPN Family (ABC, ESPN, ESPN2, ESPN3, ESPNU, Big 12 Now, LHN)

2022 NFL Draft
- Top draft pick: Breece Hall (Iowa State)
- Picked by: New York Jets, 36th overall

Championship Game
- Champions: Baylor
- Runners-up: Oklahoma State
- Finals MVP: Blake Shapen, BU

Seasons
- 2020 2022

2021 Big 12 Conference football standings
	Conf.			Overall
Team	W		L	W		L
No. 7 Oklahoma State y	8	–	1	12	–	2
No. 5 Baylor y$	7	–	2	12	–	2
No. 10 Oklahoma	7	–	2	11	–	2
Iowa State	5	–	4	7	–	6
Kansas State	4	–	5	8	–	5
West Virginia	4	–	5	6	–	7
Texas	3	–	6	5	–	7
TCU	3	–	6	5	–	7
Texas Tech	3	–	6	7	–	6
Kansas	1	–	8	2	–	10
Championship: Baylor 21, Oklahoma State 16
$ – Conference champion; y – Championship game participant; Rankings from AP Poll

The 2021 Big 12 Conference football season was the 26th season of the Big 12 Conference football and took place during the 2021 NCAA Division I FBS football season. The season began on September 4, 2021, with non-conference play. Conference play began on September 18. The entire schedule was released on February 11, 2021.

The 2021 season was the tenth season for the Big 12 since the early 2010s conference realignment brought the Big 12 membership to its current form.

The 2021 Big 12 Championship Game was played at AT&T Stadium in Arlington, Texas, on December 4, 2021.

== Preseason ==
=== Big 12 media days ===
The 2021 Big 12 media days were held on July 14–15 in Frisco, Texas. The teams and representatives in respective order were as follows:

- Big 12 Commissioner – Bob Bowlsby
- Baylor – Dave Aranda (HC), Connor Galvin (OL) & Terrel Bernard (LB)
- Iowa State – Matt Campbell (HC), Breece Hall (RB) & Greg Eisworth II (DB)
- Kansas – Lance Leipold (HC), Kwamie Lassiter II (WR) & Kenny Logan Jr. (S)
- Kansas State – Chris Klieman (HC), Skylar Thompson (QB) & Jahron McPherson (DB)
- Oklahoma – Lincoln Riley (HC), Jeremiah Hall (FB) & Nik Bonitto (LB)
- Oklahoma State – Mike Gundy (HC), Spencer Sanders (QB) & Malcolm Rodriguez (DE)
- TCU – Gary Patterson (HC), Max Duggan (QB) & Ochaun Mathis (DE)
- Texas – Steve Sarkisian (HC), Bijan Robinson (RB) & Keondre Coburn (DT)
- Texas Tech – Matt Wells (HC), Dawson Deaton (OL) & Riko Jeffers (LB)
- West Virginia – Neal Brown (HC), Leddie Brown (RB) & Dante Stills (DL)

=== Preseason poll ===
The preseason poll was released on July 8, 2021.

Big 12
Predicted finish	Team	Votes (1st place)
1	Oklahoma	365 (35)
2	Iowa State	351 (4)
3	Texas	273
4	Oklahoma State	266
5	TCU	255
6	West Virginia	185
7	Kansas State	163
8	Baylor	124
9	Texas Tech	103
10	Kansas	39

- First place votes in ()

=== Preseason Watch Lists ===
Award	Head coach/Player	School	Position	Link
Lott Trophy	Mike Rose	Iowa State	LB	
Lott Trophy	Tre'Vius Hodges-Tomlinson	TCU	CB	
Lott Trophy	Josh Thompson	Texas	CB	
Dodd Trophy	Matt Campbell	Iowa State	HC	
Dodd Trophy	Lincoln Riley	Oklahoma	HC	
Maxwell Award	Brock Purdy	Iowa State	QB	
Maxwell Award	Breece Hall	Iowa State	RB	
Maxwell Award	Skylar Thompson	Kansas State	QB	
Maxwell Award	Deuce Vaughn	Kansas State	RB	
Maxwell Award	Spencer Rattler	Oklahoma	QB	
Maxwell Award	Marvin Mims	Oklahoma	WR	
Maxwell Award	Max Duggan	TCU	QB	
Maxwell Award	Bijan Robinson	Texas	RB	
Maxwell Award	Erik Ezukanma	Texas Tech	WR	
Maxwell Award	Jarret Doege	West Virginia	QB	
Maxwell Award	Leddie Brown	West Virginia	RB	
Bednarik Award	Jalen Pitre	Baylor	DB	
Bednarik Award	Terrel Bernard	Baylor	LB	
Bednarik Award	Will McDonald IV	Iowa State	DE	
Bednarik Award	Mike Rose	Iowa State	LB	
Bednarik Award	Nik Bonitto	Oklahoma	LB	
Bednarik Award	Isaiah Thomas	Oklahoma	DE	
Bednarik Award	Malcolm Rodriguez	Oklahoma State	LB	
Bednarik Award	Kolby Harvell-Peel	Oklahoma State	S	
Bednarik Award	Ochaun Mathis	TCU	DE	
Bednarik Award	Tre'Vius Hodges-Tomlinson	TCU	CB	
Bednarik Award	Keondre Coburn	Texas	DT	
Bednarik Award	Colin Schooler	Texas Tech	LB	
Davey O'Brien Award	Brock Purdy	Iowa State	QB	
Davey O'Brien Award	Spencer Rattler	Oklahoma	QB	
Davey O'Brien Award	Spencer Sanders	Oklahoma State	QB	
Davey O'Brien Award	Max Duggan	TCU	QB	
Doak Walker Award	Abram Smith	Baylor	RB	
Doak Walker Award	Breece Hall	Iowa State	RB	
Doak Walker Award	Kennedy Brooks	Oklahoma	RB	
Doak Walker Award	Eric Gray	Oklahoma	RB	
Doak Walker Award	LD Brown	Oklahoma State	RB	
Doak Walker Award	Jaylen Warren	Oklahoma State	RB	
Doak Walker Award	Zach Evans	TCU	RB	
Doak Walker Award	Leddie Brown	West Virginia	RB	
Fred Biletnikoff Award	Tyquan Thornton	Baylor	WR	
Fred Biletnikoff Award	Xavier Hutchinson	Iowa State	WR	
Fred Biletnikoff Award	Charlie Kolar	Iowa State	TE	
Fred Biletnikoff Award	Marvin Mims	Oklahoma	WR	
Fred Biletnikoff Award	Michael Woods II	Oklahoma	WR	
Fred Biletnikoff Award	Xavier Worthy	Texas	WR	
Fred Biletnikoff Award	Erik Ezukanma	Texas Tech	WR	
Fred Biletnikoff Award	Kaylon Geiger	Texas Tech	WR	
John Mackey Award	Ben Sims	Baylor	TE	
John Mackey Award	Chase Allen	Iowa State	TE	
John Mackey Award	Charlie Kolar	Iowa State	TE	
John Mackey Award	Austin Stogner	Oklahoma	TE	
John Mackey Award	Cade Brewer	Texas	TE	
John Mackey Award	Travis Koontz	Texas Tech	TE	
John Mackey Award	Mike O'Laughlin	West Virginia	TE	
Rimington Trophy	Colin Newell	Iowa State	C	
Rimington Trophy	Mike Novitsky	Kansas	C	
Rimington Trophy	Danny Godlevske	Oklahoma State	C	
Rimington Trophy	Steve Avila	TCU	C	
Rimington Trophy	Dawson Deaton	Texas Tech	C	
Butkus Award	Terrel Bernard	Baylor	LB	
Butkus Award	Mike Rose	Iowa State	LB	
Butkus Award	Brian Asamoah	Oklahoma	LB	
Butkus Award	Nik Bonitto	Oklahoma	LB	
Butkus Award	Malcolm Rodriguez	Oklahoma State	LB	
Butkus Award	DeMarvion Overshown	Texas	LB	
Butkus Award	Colin Schooler	Texas Tech	LB	
Outland Trophy	Colin Newell	Iowa State	C	
Outland Trophy	Derek Schweiger	Iowa State	G	
Outland Trophy	Marquis Hayes	Oklahoma	G	
Outland Trophy	Tyrese Robinson	Oklahoma	G	
Outland Trophy	Perrion Winfrey	Oklahoma	DT	
Outland Trophy	Josh Sills	Oklahoma State	G	
Outland Trophy	Dawson Deaton	Texas Tech	C	
Outland Trophy	Dante Stills	West Virginia	DT	
Bronko Nagurski Trophy	Terrel Bernard	Baylor	LB	
Bronko Nagurski Trophy	Jalen Pitre	Baylor	S	
Bronko Nagurski Trophy	Greg Eisworth	Iowa State	S	
Bronko Nagurski Trophy	Will McDonald IV	Iowa State	DE	
Bronko Nagurski Trophy	Mike Rose	Iowa State	LB	
Bronko Nagurski Trophy	Nik Bonitto	Oklahoma	LB	
Bronko Nagurski Trophy	Isaiah Thomas	Oklahoma	DE	
Bronko Nagurski Trophy	Perrion Winfrey	Oklahoma	DT	
Bronko Nagurski Trophy	Malcolm Rodriguez	Oklahoma State	LB	
Bronko Nagurski Trophy	Tre'Vius Hodges-Tomlinson	TCU	CB	
Bronko Nagurski Trophy	Ochaun Mathis	TCU	DE	
Bronko Nagurski Trophy	Dante Stills	West Virginia	DT	
Lou Groza Award	Gabe Brkic	Oklahoma	K	
Lou Groza Award	Alex Hale	Oklahoma State	K	
Lou Groza Award	Cameron Dicker	Texas	K	
Paul Hornung Award	Trestan Ebner	Baylor	RB	
Paul Hornung Award	Kenny Logan Jr.	Kansas	S	
Paul Hornung Award	Phillip Brooks	Kansas State	WR	
Paul Hornung Award	Marvin Mims	Oklahoma	WR	
Paul Hornung Award	Derius Davis	TCU	WR	
Paul Hornung Award	D'Shawn Jamison	Texas	CB	
Paul Hornung Award	Myles Price	Texas Tech	WR	
Paul Hornung Award	Winston Wright	West Virginia	WR	
Wuerffel Trophy	Byron Hanspard Jr.	Baylor	DB	
Wuerffel Trophy	Brock Purdy	Iowa State	QB	
Wuerffel Trophy	Kwamie Lassiter II	Kansas	WR	
Wuerffel Trophy	Skylar Thompson	Kansas State	QB	
Wuerffel Trophy	Pat Fields	Oklahoma	DB	
Wuerffel Trophy	Obinna Eze	TCU	OL	
Wuerffel Trophy	Tony Bradford Jr.	Texas Tech	DL	
Wuerffel Trophy	Evan Staley	West Virginia	K	
Wuerffel Trophy	Jarret Doege	West Virginia	QB	
Wuerffel Trophy	Sean Mahone	West Virginia	DB	
Walter Camp Award	Breece Hall	Iowa State	RB	
Walter Camp Award	Charlie Kolar	Iowa State	TE	
Walter Camp Award	Brock Purdy	Iowa State	QB	
Walter Camp Award	Mike Rose	Iowa State	LB	
Walter Camp Award	Spencer Rattler	Oklahoma	QB	
Walter Camp Award	Bijan Robinson	Texas	RB	
Manning Award	Brock Purdy	Iowa State	QB	
Manning Award	Skyler Thompson	Kansas State	QB	
Manning Award	Spencer Rattler	Oklahoma	QB	
Manning Award	Max Duggan	TCU	QB	
Earl Campbell Tyler Rose Award	Trestan Ebner	Baylor	RB	
Earl Campbell Tyler Rose Award	Daniel Jackson	Iowa State	WR	
Earl Campbell Tyler Rose Award	Deuce Vaughn	Kansas State	RB	
Earl Campbell Tyler Rose Award	Kennedy Brooks	Oklahoma	RB	
Earl Campbell Tyler Rose Award	Marvin Mims	Oklahoma	WR	
Earl Campbell Tyler Rose Award	Spencer Sanders	Oklahoma State	QB	
Earl Campbell Tyler Rose Award	Max Duggan	TCU	QB	
Earl Campbell Tyler Rose Award	Zach Evans	TCU	RB	
Earl Campbell Tyler Rose Award	Quentin Johnston	TCU	WR	
Earl Campbell Tyler Rose Award	Bijan Robinson	Texas	RB	
Earl Campbell Tyler Rose Award	Erik Ezukanma	Texas Tech	WR	
Earl Campbell Tyler Rose Award	Jarret Doege	West Virginia	QB	
Ray Guy Award	Isaac Power	Baylor	P	
Ray Guy Award	Ty Zentner	Kansas State	P	
Ray Guy Award	Michael Turk	Oklahoma	P	
Ray Guy Award	Tom Hutton	Oklahoma State	P	
Ray Guy Award	Cameron Dicker	Texas	P	
Ray Guy Award	Ryan Bujcevski	Texas	P	
Ray Guy Award	Austin McNamara	Texas Tech	P	
Ray Guy Award	Tyler Sumpter	West Virginia	P	
Polynesian College Football Player Of The Year Award	Siaki Ika	Baylor	OL	
Polynesian College Football Player Of The Year Award	Jaylen Warren	Oklahoma State	RB	
Polynesian College Football Player Of The Year Award	Junior Angilau	Texas	OL	
Johnny Unitas Golden Arm Award	Brock Purdy	Iowa State	QB	
Johnny Unitas Golden Arm Award	Skylar Thompson	Kansas State	QB	
Johnny Unitas Golden Arm Award	Spencer Rattler	Oklahoma	QB	
Johnny Unitas Golden Arm Award	Max Duggan	TCU	QB	
Johnny Unitas Golden Arm Award	Casey Thompson	Texas	QB	
Johnny Unitas Golden Arm Award	Tyler Shough	Texas Tech	QB	
Johnny Unitas Golden Arm Award	Jarret Doege	West Virginia	QB	

=== Preseason All-Conference teams ===
2021 Preseason All-Big 12

- Offensive Player of the Year: Spencer Rattler, QB, Oklahoma
- Defensive Player of the Year: Mike Rose, LB, Iowa State
- Newcomer of the Year: Eric Gray, RB, Oklahoma

All-Big 12 Offense
Position	Player	Class	Team
QB	Spencer Rattler	So.	Oklahoma
RB	Breece Hall	Jr.	Iowa State
RB	Bijan Robinson	So.	Texas
FB	Jeremiah Hall	Sr.	Oklahoma
WR	Xavier Hutchinson	Sr.	Iowa State
WR	Marvin Mims	So.	Oklahoma
WR	Erik Ezukanma	Jr.	Texas Tech
TE	Charlie Kolar	Sr.	Iowa State
OL	Trevor Downing	Jr.	Iowa State
OL	Colin Newell	Sr.	Iowa State
OL	Marquis Hayes	Sr.	Oklahoma
OL	Wanya Morris	Jr.	Oklahoma
OL	Josh Sills	Sr.	Oklahoma State
OL	Dawson Deaton	Sr.	Texas Tech
PK	Gabe Brkic	Jr.	Oklahoma
KR/PR	Phillip Brooks	Jr.	Kansas State

All-Big 12 Defense
Position	Player	Class	Team
DL	Will McDonald IV	Jr.	Iowa State
DL	Isaiah Thomas	Sr.	Oklahoma
DL	Perrion Winfrey	Sr.	Oklahoma
DL	Ochaun Mathis	Jr.	TCU
DL	Dante Stills	Sr.	West Virginia
LB	Terrel Bernard	Sr.	Baylor
LB	Mike Rose	Sr.	Iowa State
LB	Nik Bonitto	Jr.	Oklahoma
DB	Kolby Harvell-Peel	Sr.	Oklahoma State
DB	Jalen Pitre	Sr.	Baylor
DB	Tre’Vius Hodges-Tomlinson	Jr.	TCU
DB	Greg Eisworth	Sr.	Iowa State
DB	DShawn Jamison	Sr.	Texas
P	Austin McNamara	Jr.	Texas Tech

== Head coaches ==
There were two head coaching changes in the conference following the conclusion of the 2019 season. On January 2, 2021, Texas announced that head coach Tom Herman would be departing the team, and that he would be replaced by Alabama offensive coordinator Steve Sarkisian. In addition, on March 8, 2021, Kansas announced they had fired Les Miles. On March 11, Emmett Jones was named interim head coach. On April 30, Kansas announced that Lance Leipold, formerly head coach of the Buffalo Bulls, would take over the position.

Team	Head coach	Years at school	Overall record	Record at school	Big–12 record
Baylor	Dave Aranda	2	2–7	2–7	2–7
Iowa State	Matt Campbell	6	70–42	30–25	26–19
Kansas	Lance Leipold	1	146–39	0–0	0–0
Kansas State	Chris Klieman	3	84–24	12–11	9–9
Oklahoma	Lincoln Riley	5	41–8	41–8	34–5
Oklahoma State	Mike Gundy	17	137–67	137–67	83–55
TCU	Gary Patterson	21	178–74	178–74	115–52
Texas	Steve Sarkisian	1	46–35	0–0	1–2*
Texas Tech	Matt Wells	3	52–48	8–14	5–13
West Virginia	Neal Brown	3	46–27	9–10	7–10

*Includes games played against Nebraska and Baylor while at Washington

== Schedule ==
Index to colors and formatting
Big 12 member won
Big 12 member lost
Big 12 teams in **bold**

All times Central time.

† denotes Homecoming game

=== Regular season schedule ===
==== Week 1 ====
Date	Time	Visiting team	Home team	Site	TV	Result	Attendance	Ref.
September 3	7:00 p.m.	South Dakota	**Kansas**	David Booth Kansas Memorial Stadium • Lawrence, KS	ESPN+	**W** 17–14	26,103	
September 4	11:00 a.m.	Stanford	**Kansas State**	AT&T Stadium • Arlington, TX	FS1	**W** 24–7	28,668	
September 4	11:00 a.m.	No. 2 **Oklahoma**	Tulane	Gaylord Family Oklahoma Memorial Stadium • Norman, OK (Note: Originally scheduled to be played as an away game, the game against Tulane was moved to Norman on August 30, 2021, due to safety concerns related to Hurricane Ida. Tulane will remain the designated home team despite Oklahoma hosting the game.)	ABC	**W** 40–35	42,206	
September 4	2:30 p.m.	**West Virginia**	Maryland	Maryland Stadium • College Park, MD (rivalry)	ESPN	**L** 24–30	43,811	
September 4	2:30 p.m.	No. 21 (FCS) Northern Iowa	No. 7 **Iowa State**	Jack Trice Stadium • Ames, IA	ESPN+	**W** 16–10	61,500	
September 4	3:30 p.m.	No. 23 Louisiana	No. 21 **Texas**	Darrell K Royal–Texas Memorial Stadium • Austin, TX	Fox	**W** 38–18	91,113	
September 4	6:00 p.m.	**Texas Tech**	Houston	NRG Stadium • Houston, TX	ESPN	**W** 38–21	43,478	
September 4	6:00 p.m.	No. 24 (FCS) Missouri State	**Oklahoma State**	Boone Pickens Stadium • Stillwater, OK	ESPN+	**W** 23–16	50,807	
September 4	6:00 p.m.	**Baylor**	Texas State	Bobcat Stadium • San Marcos, TX	ESPN+	**W** 29–20	26,573	
September 4	7:00 p.m.	Duquesne	**TCU**	Amon G. Carter Stadium • Fort Worth, TX	ESPN+	**W** 45–3	35,377	
^{#}Rankings from AP Poll released prior to game. All times are in Central Time.

==== Week 2 ====
Date	Time	Visiting team	Home team	Site	TV	Result	Attendance	Ref.
September 10	6:30 p.m.	**Kansas**	No. 17 Coastal Carolina	Brooks Stadium • Conway, SC	ESPN2	**L** 22–49	17,697	
September 11	11:00 a.m.	Tulsa	**Oklahoma State**	Boone Pickens Stadium • Stillwater, OK (rivalry)	FS1	**W** 28–23	52,127	
September 11	2:30 p.m.	California	**TCU**	Amon G. Carter Stadium • Fort Worth, TX	ESPNU	**W** 34–32	38,631	
September 11	3:30 p.m.	No. 10 Iowa	No. 9 **Iowa State**	Jack Trice Stadium • Ames, IA (rivalry)	ABC	**L** 17–27	61,500	
September 11	4:00 p.m.	LIU	**West Virginia**	Milan Puskar Stadium • Morgantown, WV	ESPN+	**W** 66–0	50,911	
September 11	6:00 p.m.	No. 15 **Texas**	Arkansas	Razorback Stadium • Fayetteville, AR (rivalry)	ESPN	**L** 21–40	74,531	
September 11	6:00 p.m.	Texas Southern	**Baylor**	McLane Stadium • Waco, TX	ESPN+	**W** 66–7	42,461	
September 11	6:00 p.m.	No. 8 (FCS) Southern Illinois	**Kansas State**	Bill Snyder Family Stadium • Manhattan, KS	ESPN+	**W** 31–23	47,628	
September 11	6:00 p.m.	Stephen F. Austin	**Texas Tech**	Jones AT&T Stadium • Lubbock, TX	ESPN+	**W** 28–22	55,271	
September 11	6:00 p.m.	Western Carolina	No. 4 **Oklahoma**	Gaylord Family Oklahoma Memorial Stadium • Norman, OK	BSOK PPV	**W** 76–0	83,538	
^{#}Rankings from AP Poll released prior to game. All times are in Central Time.

==== Week 3 ====
Date	Time	Visiting team	Home team	Site	TV	Result	Attendance	Ref.
September 18	11:00 a.m.	No. 15 Virginia Tech	**West Virginia**	Milan Puskar Stadium • Morgantown, WV (rivalry)	FS1	**W** 27–21	60,222	
September 18	11:00 a.m.	Nebraska	No. 3 **Oklahoma**	Gaylord Family Oklahoma Memorial Stadium • Norman, OK (rivalry)	Fox	**W** 23–16	84,659	
September 18	1:05 p.m.	Nevada	**Kansas State**	Bill Snyder Family Stadium • Manhattan, KS	ESPN+	**W** 38–17	48,768	
September 18	2:30 p.m.	**Baylor**	**Kansas**	David Booth Kansas Memorial Stadium • Lawrence, KS	ESPN+	**BAY** 45–7	23,218	
September 18	6:00 p.m.	FIU	**Texas Tech**	Jones AT&T Stadium • Lubbock, TX	ESPN+	**W** 54–21	50,118	
September 18	7:00 p.m.	Rice	**Texas**	Darrell K Royal–Texas Memorial Stadium • Austin, TX	LHN	**W** 58–0	91,978	
September 18	8:00 p.m.	**Oklahoma State**	Boise State	Albertsons Stadium • Boise, ID	FS1	**W** 21–20	36,702	
September 18	9:30 p.m.	No. 14 **Iowa State**	UNLV	Allegiant Stadium • Paradise, NV	CBSSN	**W** 48–3	35,193	
^{#}Rankings from AP Poll released prior to game. All times are in Central Time.

Date	Bye Week
September 18	TCU

==== Week 4 ====
Date	Time	Visiting team	Home team	Site	TV	Result	Attendance	Ref.
September 25	11:00 a.m.	**Texas Tech**	**Texas**	Darrell K Royal–Texas Memorial Stadium • Austin, TX (rivalry)	ABC	**TEX** 70–35	98,349	
September 25	11:00 a.m.	SMU	**TCU**	Amon G. Carter Stadium • Fort Worth, TX (rivalry)	FS1	**L** 34–42	46,672	
September 25	2:30 p.m.	No. 14 **Iowa State**	**Baylor**	McLane Stadium • Waco, TX	FOX	**BAY** 31–29	42,539	
September 25	3:00 p.m.	**Kansas**	Duke	Wallace Wade Stadium • Durham, NC	ACCN	**L** 33–52	19,128	
September 25	6:00 p.m.	No. 25 **Kansas State**	**Oklahoma State**	Boone Pickens Stadium • Stillwater, OK	ESPN+	**OKST** 31–20	51,444	
September 25	6:30 p.m.	**West Virginia**	No. 4 **Oklahoma**	Gaylord Family Oklahoma Memorial Stadium • Norman, OK	ABC	**OKLA** 16–13	84,353	
^{#}Rankings from AP Poll released prior to game. All times are in Central Time.

==== Week 5 ====
Date	Time	Visiting team	Home team	Site	TV	Result	Attendance	Ref.
October 2	11:00 a.m.	**Texas**	**TCU**	Amon G. Carter Stadium • Fort Worth, TX (rivalry)	ABC	**TEX** 32–27	43,337	
October 2	2:30 p.m.	No. 6 **Oklahoma**	**Kansas State**	Bill Snyder Family Stadium • Manhattan, KS	FOX	**OKLA** 37–31	47,690	
October 2	2:30 p.m.	**Texas Tech**	**West Virginia**	Milan Puskar Stadium • Morgantown, WV	ESPN2	**TTU** 23–20	54,090	
October 2	6:00 p.m.	No. 21 **Baylor**	No. 19 **Oklahoma State**	Boone Pickens Stadium • Stillwater, OK	ESPN2	**OKST** 24–14	52,144	
October 2	6:00 p.m.	**Kansas**	**Iowa State**	Jack Trice Stadium • Ames, IA	FS1	**ISU** 59–7	60,446	
^{#}Rankings from AP Poll released prior to game. All times are in Central Time.

==== Week 6 ====
Date	Time	Visiting team	Home team	Site	TV	Result	Attendance	Ref.
October 9	11:00 a.m.	**West Virginia**	**Baylor**	McLane Stadium • Waco, TX	FS1	**BAY** 45–20	43,569	
October 9	11:00 a.m.	No. 6 **Oklahoma**	No. 21 **Texas**	Cotton Bowl • Dallas, TX (rivalry)	ABC	**OKLA** 55–48	92,100	
October 9	6:00 p.m.	**TCU**	**Texas Tech**	Jones AT&T Stadium • Lubbock, TX (rivalry)	ESPN	**TCU** 52–31	55,821	
^{#}Rankings from AP Poll released prior to game. All times are in Central Time.

Date	Bye Week			
October 9	Iowa State	Kansas	Kansas State	No. 12 Oklahoma State

==== Week 7 ====
Date	Time	Visiting team	Home team	Site	TV	Result	Attendance	Ref.
October 16	2:30 p.m.	No. 19 BYU	**Baylor**	McLane Stadium • Waco, TX	ESPN	**W** 38–24	48,016	
October 16	11:00 a.m.	**Texas Tech**	**Kansas**	Memorial Stadium • Lawrence, KS	FS1	**TT** 41–14	25,106	
October 16	6:30 p.m.	**Iowa State**	**Kansas State**	Bill Snyder Family Memorial Stadium • Manhattan, KS (rivalry)	ESPN2	**ISU** 33–20	48,363	
October 16	6:30 p.m.	**TCU**	No. 4 **Oklahoma**	Gaylord Family Memorial Stadium • Norman, OK	ABC	**OKLA** 52–31	84,391	
October 16	11:00 a.m.	No. 12 **Oklahoma State**	No. 25 **Texas**	Darrell K. Royal Memorial Stadium • Austin, TX	FOX	**OKST** 32–24	99,916	
^{#}Rankings from AP Poll released prior to game. All times are in Central Time.

Date	Bye Week
October 16	West Virginia

==== Week 8 ====
Date	Time	Visiting team	Home team	Site	TV	Result	Attendance	Ref.
October 23†	2:30 p.m.	No. 8 **Oklahoma State**	**Iowa State**	Jack Trice Stadium • Ames, IA	FOX	**ISU** 24-21	61,500	
October 23	11:00 a.m.	**Kansas State**	**Texas Tech**	Jones AT&T Stadium • Lubbock, TX	FS1	**KSU** 25-24	52,874	
October 23	11:00 a.m.	No. 3 **Oklahoma**	**Kansas**	Memorial Stadium • Lawrence, KS	ESPN	**OKLA** 35-23	26,321	
October 23†	6:30 p.m.	**West Virginia**	**TCU**	Amon G. Carter Stadium • Fort Worth, TX	ESPNU	**WVU** 29-17	37,288	
^{#}Rankings from AP Poll released prior to game. All times are in Central Time.

Date	Bye Week	
October 23	No. 20 Baylor	Texas

==== Week 9 ====
Date	Time	Visiting team	Home team	Site	TV	Result	Attendance	Ref.
October 30	1:00 p.m.	No. 22 **Iowa State**	**West Virginia**	Milan Puskar Stadium • Morgantown, WV	ESPN+	**WVU** 38–31	45,613	
October 30	2:30 p.m.	**TCU**	**Kansas State**	Bill Snyder Family Memorial Stadium • Manhattan, KS	ESPNU	**KSU** 31–12	44,339	
October 30	2:30 p.m.	**Texas Tech**	No. 4 **Oklahoma**	Gaylord Family Memorial Stadium • Norman, OK	ABC	**OKLA** 52–21	82,732	
October 30	11:00 a.m.	**Texas**	No. 16 **Baylor**	McLane Stadium • Baylor, TX	ABC	**BAY** 31–24	45,834	
October 30	6:00 p.m.	**Kansas**	No. 15 **Oklahoma State**	Boone Pickens Stadium • Stillwater, OK	FS1	**OKST** 55–3	55,026	
^{#}Rankings from AP Poll released prior to game. All times are in Central Time.

==== Week 10 ====
Date	Time	Visiting team	Home team	Site	TV	Result	Attendance	Ref.
November 6	11:00 a.m.	**Kansas State**	**Kansas**	Memorial Stadium • Lawrence, KS (rivalry)	FS1	**KSU** 35–10	30,611	
November 6	2:30 p.m.	No. 11 **Oklahoma State**	**West Virginia**	Milan Puskar Stadium • Morgantown, WV	ESPN	**OKST** 24–3	50,109	
November 6	2:30 p.m.	No. 14 **Baylor**	**TCU**	Amon G. Carter Stadium • Fort Worth, TX (rivalry)	FOX	**TCU** 30–28	40,338	
November 6	6:30 p.m.	**Texas**	**Iowa State**	Jack Trice Stadium • Ames, IA	FS1	**ISU** 30–7	61,500	
^{#}Rankings from AP Poll released prior to game. All times are in Central Time.

Date	Bye Week	
November 6	No. 4 Oklahoma	Texas Tech

==== Week 11 ====
Date	Time	Visiting team	Home team	Site	TV	Result	Attendance	Ref.
November 13	2:30 p.m.	**Iowa State**	**Texas Tech**	Jones AT&T Stadium • Lubbock, TC	ESPN2	**TT** 41-38	47,158	
November 13	11:00 a.m.	**West Virginia**	**Kansas State**	Bill Snyder Family Memorial Stadium • Manhattan, KS	FS1	**KSU** 34-17	43,932	
November 13	6:30 p.m.	**Kansas**	**Texas**	Darrell K. Royal Memorial Stadium • Austin, TX	ESPNU	**KU** 57-56 ^{OT}	95,202	
November 13	11:00 a.m.	No. 4 **Oklahoma**	No. 18 **Baylor**	McLane Stadium • Baylor, TX	FOX	**BU** 27-14	45,834	
November 13	7:00 p.m.	**TCU**	No. 10 **Oklahoma State**	Boone Pickens Stadium • Stillwater, OK	FOX	**OKST** 63-17	54,549	
^{#}Rankings from AP Poll released prior to game. All times are in Central Time.

==== Week 12 ====
Date	Time	Visiting team	Home team	Site	TV	Result	Attendance	Ref.
November 20	11:00 a.m.	**Texas**	**West Virginia**	Milan Puskar Stadium • Morgantown, WV	ESPN2	**WVU** 31–21	48,755	
November 20	11:00 a.m.	**Iowa State**	No. 12 **Oklahoma**	Gaylord Family Memorial Stadium • Norman, OK	FOX	**OKLA** 28–21	82,685	
November 20	3:00 p.m.	**Kansas**	**TCU**	Amon G. Carter Stadium • Fort Worth, TX	ESPN+	**TCU** 31–28	35,061	
November 20	4:30 p.m.	No. 11 **Baylor**	**Kansas State**	Bill Snyder Family Memorial Stadium • Manhattan, KS	FS1	**BU** 20–10	43,857	
November 20	7:00 p.m.	No. 9 **Oklahoma State**	**Texas Tech**	Jones AT&T Stadium • Lubbock, TX	FOX	**OKST** 23–0	53,169	
^{#}Rankings from AP Poll released prior to game. All times are in Central Time.

==== Week 13 ====
Date	Time	Visiting team	Home team	Site	TV	Result	Attendance	Ref.
November 26	3:30 p.m.	**TCU**	**Iowa State**	Jack Trice Stadium • Ames, IA	FS1	**ISU** 48–14	57,775	
November 26	11:00 a.m.	**Kansas State**	**Texas**	Darrell K. Royal Memorial Stadium • Austin, TX	FOX	**TEX** 22–17	75,072	
November 27	11:00 a.m.	**Texas Tech**	No. 9 **Baylor**	McLane Stadium • Baylor, TX (rivalry)	FS1	**BU** 27–24	43,901	
November 27	6:00 p.m.	**West Virginia**	**Kansas**	Memorial Stadium • Lawrence, KS	FS1	**WVU** 34–28	23,117	
November 27	6:30 p.m.	No. 10 **Oklahoma**	No. 7 **Oklahoma State**	Boone Pickens Stadium • Stillwater, OK (rivalry)	ABC	**OKST** 37–33	54,990	
^{#}Rankings from AP Poll released prior to game. All times are in Central Time.

=== Championship Game ===
Date	Time	Visiting team	Home team	Site	TV	Result	Attendance	Ref.
December 4	11:00 a.m.	No. 9 Baylor	No. 5 Oklahoma State	AT&T Stadium • Arlington, Texas	ABC	**BU** 21-16	65,771	
^{#}Rankings from AP Poll released prior to game. All times are in Central Time.

== Head to head matchups ==
Head to head Source:
Team	Baylor	Iowa State	Kansas	Kansas State	Oklahoma	Oklahoma State	TCU	Texas	Texas Tech	West Virginia
Baylor	—	W, 31-29	W, 45-7	W, 20-10	W 27-14	L, 14-24	L, 28–30	W, 31–24	W, 27-24	W, 45-20
Iowa State	L, 29-31	—	W, 59-7	W, 33-20	L, 21-28	W, 24-21	W, 48-14	W, 30–7	L, 38-41	L, 31-38
Kansas	L, 45–7	L, 7-59	—	L, 10–35	L, 23-35	L, 3-55	L, 28-31	W, 57-56	L,14-41	L, 28-34
Kansas State	L, 10-20	L, 20-33	W, 35-10	—	L, 31-37	L, 20–31	W, 31–12	L, 17-22	W, 25-24	W, 34-17
Oklahoma	L, 14-28	W, 28-21	W, 35-23	W, 37-31	—	L, 31-37	W, 52-31	W, 55-48	W, 52–21	W, 16-13
Oklahoma State	W, 24-14	L, 21-24	W, 55-3	W, 31-20	W, 37-31	—	W, 63-17	W, 32-24	W, 23-0	W, 24–3
TCU	W, 30-28	L, 14-48	W, 31-28	L, 12-31	L, 31-52	L, 17-63	—	L, 27-32	W, 52-31	L, 17-29
Texas	L, 24-31	L, 7-30	L, 56-57	W, 22-17	L, 48-55	L, 24–32	W, 32-27	—	W, 70-35	L, 23-31
Texas Tech	L, 24-27	W, 41-38	W, 41–34	L, 24–25	L, 21–52	L, 0-23	L, 31–52	L, 35-70	—	W, 23–30
West Virginia	L, 20-45	W, 38-30	W, 34-28	L, 17-34	L, 13-16	L, 3-24	W, 29–17	W, 31-23	L, 20-23	—

Updated with the results of all regular season conference games.

== Postseason ==
=== Bowl games ===
Legend
Big 12 win
Big 12 loss

For the 2020–2025 bowl cycle, The Big-12 will have annually eight appearances in the following bowls: Sugar Bowl (unless they are selected for playoffs filled by a Big-12 team if champion is in the playoffs), First Responder Bowl, Liberty Bowl, Alamo Bowl, Guaranteed Rate Bowl, Cheez-It Bowl and Texas Bowl. The Big-12 teams will go to a New Year's Six bowl if a team finishes higher than the champions of Power Five conferences in the final College Football Playoff rankings. The Big-12 champion are also eligible for the College Football Playoff if they're among the top four teams in the final CFP ranking.

Bowl game	Date	Site	Time (CST)	Television	Big-12 team	Opponent	Score	Attendance
Liberty Bowl	December 28, 2021	Liberty Bowl • Memphis, TN	5:45 p.m.	ESPN	Texas Tech	Mississippi State	W, 34–7	48,615
Guaranteed Rate Bowl	December 28, 2021	Chase Field • Phoenix, Arizona	9:15 p.m.	ESPN	West Virginia	Minnesota	L, 18–6	21,220
Cheez-It Bowl	December 29, 2021	Camping World Stadium • Orlando, FL	4:45 p.m.	ESPN	Iowa State	Clemson	L, 20–13	39,051
Alamo Bowl	December 29, 2021	Alamodome • San Antonio, Texas	8:15 p.m.	ESPN	Oklahoma	Oregon	W, 47–32	59,121
Texas Bowl	January 4, 2022	NRG Stadium • Houston, TX	7:45 p.m.	ESPN	Kansas State	LSU	W, 42–20	52,207
**New Year's Six bowl games**
Sugar Bowl	January 1, 2022	Caesars Superdome • New Orleans, Louisiana	7:45 p.m.	ESPN	Baylor	Ole Miss	W, 21–7	66,479
Fiesta Bowl	January 1, 2022	State Farm Stadium • Glendale, Arizona	12:00 p.m.	ESPN	Oklahoma State	Notre Dame	W, 37–35	49,550

Rankings are from CFP rankings. All times Central Time Zone. Big-12 teams shown in bold.

== Big 12 vs other conferences ==
=== Records against other conferences ===
Regular Season

Power 5 Conferences	Record
ACC	1–1
Big Ten	1–2
BYU/Notre Dame	1–0
Pac-12	2–0
SEC	0–1
Power 5 Total	5-4
Other FBS Conferences	Record
The American	3–1
C–USA	2–0
Independents (Excluding BYU & Notre Dame)	0–0
MAC	0–0
Mountain West	3–0
Sun Belt	2–1
Other FBS Total	10-2
FCS Opponents	Record
Football Championship Subdivision	9–0
Total Non-Conference Record	24-6

Post Season

Power Conferences 5	Record
ACC	0–1
Big Ten	0–1
BYU/Notre Dame	1–0
Pac-12	1–0
SEC	3–0
Power 5 Total	5–2
Other FBS Conferences	Record
C–USA	0–0
Independents (Excluding BYU & Notre Dame)	0–0
MAC	0–0
Mountain West	0–0
Sun Belt	0–0
Other FBS Total	0–0
Total Bowl Record	5–2

==== Big 12 vs Power 5 matchups ====
This is a list of the Power Five conferences teams (ACC, Big Ten, Pac-12, Notre Dame, BYU and SEC).

Date	Big 12 Team	Opponent	Conference	Location	Result
September 4	Kansas State	Stanford	Pac-12	AT&T Stadium, Arlington, Texas	W, 24–7
September 4	West Virginia	Maryland (rivalry)	Big Ten	Maryland Stadium, College Park, Maryland	L, 24–30
September 11	No. 9 Iowa State	No. 10 Iowa (rivalry)	Big Ten	Jack Trice Stadium, Ames, Iowa	L, 17–27
September 11	No. 15 Texas	Arkansas (rivalry)	SEC	Donald W. Reynolds Razorback Stadium, Fayetteville, Ark.	L, 21–40
September 11	TCU	California	Pac-12	Amon G. Carter Stadium, Fort Worth, Texas	W, 34–32
September 18	Oklahoma	Nebraska (rivalry)	Big Ten	Gaylord Family Oklahoma Memorial Stadium, Norman, Oklahoma	W, 23–16
September 18	West Virginia	Virginia Tech (rivalry)	ACC	Milan Puskar Stadium, Morgantown, WV	W, 27–21
September 25	Kansas	Duke	ACC	Wallace Wade Stadium, Durham, N.C.	L, 33–52
October 16	Baylor	BYU	Independents	McLane Stadium, Waco, Texas	W, 38-24

==== Big 12 vs Group of Five matchups ====
The following games include Big 12 teams competing against teams from The American, C-USA, MAC, Mountain West or Sun Belt.

Date	Conference	Visitor	Home	Site	Score
September 4	Sun Belt	Baylor	Texas State	Bobcat Stadium • San Marcos, TX	W, 29–20
September 4	The American	No. 2 Oklahoma	Tulane	Gaylord Family Oklahoma Memorial Stadium • Norman, OK (Note: Originally scheduled to be played as an away game, the game against Tulane was moved to Norman on August 30, 2021, due to safety concerns related to Hurricane Ida. Tulane will remain the designated home team despite Oklahoma hosting the game.)	W, 40–35
September 4	Sun Belt	No. 23 Louisiana	No. 21 Texas	Darrell K Royal–Texas Memorial Stadium • Austin, TX	W, 38–18
September 4	The American	Texas Tech	Houston	NRG Stadium • Houston, TX	W, 38–21
September 10	Sun Belt	Kansas	Coastal Carolina	Brooks Stadium • Conway, SC	L, 22–49
September 11	The American	Tulsa (rivalry)	Oklahoma State	Boone Pickens Stadium • Stillwater, OK	W, 28–23
September 18	Mountain West	Iowa State	UNLV	Allegiant Stadium • Paradise, NV	W, 48–3
September 18	Mountain West	Nevada	Kansas State	Bill Snyder Family Stadium • Manhattan, KS	W, 38–17
September 18	Mountain West	Oklahoma State	Boise State	Albertsons Stadium • Boise, ID	W, 21–20
September 18	C-USA	Rice (rivalry)	Texas	Darrell K Royal–Texas Memorial Stadium • Austin, TX	W, 58–0
September 18	C-USA	FIU	Texas Tech	Jones AT&T Stadium • Lubbock, TX	W, 54–21
September 25	The American	SMU (rivalry)	TCU	Amon G. Carter Stadium • Fort Worth, TX	L, 34–42

==== Big 12 vs FBS independents matchups ====
The following games include Big 12 teams competing against FBS Independents which include Army, Liberty, New Mexico State, UConn and UMass.

==== Big 12 vs FCS matchups ====
The Football Championship Subdivision comprises 13 conferences and two independent programs.

Date	Visitor	Home	Site	Score
September 4	Missouri State	Oklahoma State	Boone Pickens Stadium • Stillwater, OK	W, 23–16
September 4	South Dakota	Kansas	Memorial Stadium • Lawrence, KS	W, 17–14
September 4	Duquesne	TCU	Amon G. Carter Stadium • Fort Worth, TX	W, 45–3
September 4	Northern Iowa	No. 7 Iowa State	Jack Trice Stadium • Ames, IA	W, 16–10
September 11	Western Carolina	No. 4 Oklahoma	Gaylord Family Oklahoma Memorial Stadium • Norman, OK	W, 76–0
September 11	Long Island	West Virginia	Milan Puskar Stadium • Morgantown, WV	W, 66–0
September 11	Texas Southern	Baylor	McLane Stadium • Waco, TX	W, 66–7
September 11	Southern Illinois	Kansas State	Bill Snyder Family Memorial Stadium • Lawrence, KS	W, 31–23
September 11	Stephen F. Austin	Texas Tech	Jones A&T Stadium • Lubbock, TX	W, 28–22

== Rankings ==
Legend
	Improvement in ranking
	Drop in ranking
	Not ranked previous week
	No change in ranking from previous week
RV	Received votes but were not ranked in Top 25 of poll
т	Tied with team above or below also with this symbol

		Pre	Wk 1	Wk 2	Wk 3	Wk 4	Wk 5	Wk 6	Wk 7	Wk 8	Wk 9	Wk 10	Wk 11	Wk 12	Wk 13	Wk 14	Final
Baylor	AP					21	RV	RV	20	16	14	18	11	9	9	6	5
Baylor	C				RV	24	RV	RV	20	18	13	18	13	10	9	6	6
Baylor	CFP	Not released									12	13	11	8	9	7	
Iowa State	AP	7	9	14	14	RV			RV	22	RV	RV					
Iowa State	C	8	10	14	14	RV	RV	RV	RV	23	RV	RV					
Iowa State	CFP	Not released															
Kansas	AP																
Kansas	C																
Kansas	CFP	Not released															
Kansas State	AP		RV	RV	25	RV	RV	RV					RV				
Kansas State	C		RV	RV	RV								RV				
Kansas State	CFP	Not released															
Oklahoma	AP	2 (6)	4	3	4	6	6	4	3	4	4	4	12	10	13	14	10
Oklahoma	C	3 (2)	4	3	3	4	5	3	2	4	4	4	11	9	11	13	10
Oklahoma	CFP	Not released									8	8	13	10	14	16	
Oklahoma State	AP	RV	RV	RV	RV	19	12	12	8	15	11	10	9	7	5	9	7
Oklahoma State	C	22	23	22	22	18	12	12	9	15	11	10	9	7	5	9	7
Oklahoma State	CFP	Not released									11	10	9	7	5	9	
TCU	AP	RV	RV	RV	RV												
TCU	C	RV	RV	RV	RV												
TCU	CFP	Not released															
Texas	AP	21	15	RV	RV	RV	21	25	RV	RV							
Texas	C	19	15	RV	RV	RV	23	RV	RV	RV							
Texas	CFP	Not released															
Texas Tech	AP		RV	RV	RV												
Texas Tech	C						RV										
Texas Tech	CFP	Not released															
West Virginia	AP	RV			RV												
West Virginia	C	RV			RV												
West Virginia	CFP	Not released															

== Awards and honors ==
=== Player of the week honors ===
Week	Offensive			Defensive			Special Teams			Newcomer		
Week	Player	Team	Position	Player	Team	Position	Player	Team	Position	Player	Team	Position
Week 1 (Sept. 6)	Bijan Robinson	Texas	RB	Riko Jeffers	Texas Tech	LB	Gabe Brkic	Oklahoma	PK	Reggie Pearson Jr.	Texas Tech	DB
Week 2 (Sept. 13)	Zach Evans	TCU	RB	JT Woods; Malcolm Rodriguez	Baylor; Oklahoma State	S LB	LD Brown	Oklahoma State	RB	Felix Anudike-Uzomah	Kansas State	DE
Week 3 (Sept. 20)	Jaylen Warren	Oklahoma State	RB	Jared Bartlett	West Virginia	LB	Jason Taylor II	Oklahoma State	FS	Jaylen Warren	Oklahoma State	RB
Week 4 (Sept. 27)	Casey Thompson	Texas	QB	Garmon Randolph Malcolm Rodriguez	Baylor Oklahoma State	LB	Trestan Ebner	Baylor	RB	Xavier Worthy	Texas	WR
Week 5 (Oct. 4)	Bijan Robinson	Texas	RB	Colin Schooler	Texas Tech	LB	Cameron Dicker Jonathan Garibay	Texas Texas Tech	PK	Jaylen Warren	Oklahoma State	RB
Week 6 (Oct. 11)	Kennedy Brooks	Oklahoma	RB	Tre'Vius Hodges-Tomlinson	TCU	CB	Gabe Brkic	Oklahoma	PK	Caleb Williams	Oklahoma	QB
Week 7 (Oct. 18)	Caleb Williams	Oklahoma	QB	Jason Taylor II	Oklahoma St	S	Andrew Mevis	Iowa State	PK	Jaylen Warren	Oklahoma State	RB
Week 8 (Oct. 25)	Brock Purdy	Iowa State	QB	Will McDonald IV	Iowa State	DE	Casey Legg	West Virginia	PK	Devin Neal Charles Woods	Kansas West Virginia	RB DB
Week 9 (Nov. 1)	Caleb Williams	Oklahoma	QB	Felix Anudike-Uzomah	Kansas State	DE	Tanner Brown	Oklahoma State	PK	Mario Williams	Oklahoma	WR
Week 10 (Nov. 8)	Chandler Morris	TCU	QB	Will McDonald IV	Iowa State	DE	Andre Mevis	Iowa State	PK	Jaylen Warren	Oklahoma State	RB
Week 11 (Nov. 15)	Devin Neal	Kansas	RB	Terrel Bernard	Baylor	LB	Jonathan Garibay	Texas Tech	PK	Donovan Smith	Texas Tech	QB
Week 12 (Nov. 22)	Jarret Doege	West Virginia	QB	Jalen Redmond	Oklahoma	DL	Michael Turk Austin McNamara	Oklahoma Texas Tech	P P	Key Lawrence	Oklahoma	DB
Week 13 (Nov. 29)	Breece Hall	Iowa State	RB	Malcolm Rodriguez	Oklahoma State	LB	Brennan Presley	Oklahoma St	WR	Collin Oliver	Oklahoma State	DL

=== Big 12 Individual Awards ===
The following individuals received postseason honors as voted by the Big 12 Conference football coaches at the end of the season.

Award	Player	School
Offensive Player of the Year	Breece Hall, RB, Jr.	Iowa State
Defensive Player of the Year	Jalen Pitre, DB, Sr.	Baylor
Special Teams Player of the Year	Trestan Ebner, RB/KR, Sr.	Baylor
Offensive Freshman of the Year	Xavier Worthy, WR, Fr.	Texas
Offensive lineman of the Year	Connor Galvin, OL, Sr.	Baylor
Defensive Freshman of the Year	Collin Oliver, DE, Fr.	Oklahoma State
Defensive lineman of the Year	Will McDonald IV, DL, Jr. Felix Anudike-Uzomah, DL, So.	Iowa State; Kansas State
Offensive Newcomer of the Year	Jaylen Warren, RB, Sr.	Oklahoma State
Defensive Newcomer of the Year	Siaki Ika, DL, So.	Baylor
Coach of the Year	Mike Gundy	Oklahoma State

=== All-conference teams ===
The following players earned All-Big 12 honors. Any teams showing (_) following their name are indicating the number of All-Big 12 Conference Honors awarded to that university for 1st team and 2nd team respectively.

First Team

Position	Player	Class	Team
First Team Offense
QB	Spencer Sanders	Jr.	OSU
RB	Breece Hall	Jr.	ISU
RB	Bijan Robinson	So.	UT
FB	Jeremiah Hall	Sr.	OU
FB	Jared Rus	Jr.	ISU
WR	Xavier Hutchinson	Sr.	ISU
WR	Quentin Johnston	So.	TCU
WR	Xavier Worthy	Fr.	UT
TE	Charlie Kolar (U)	Sr.	ISU
OL	Connor Galvin	Sr.	BU
OL	Trevor Downing	Jr.	ISU
OL	Cooper Beebe	So.	KSU
OL	Josh Sills	Sr.	OSU
OL	Derek Kerstetter	Sr.	UT
First Team Defense
DL	Will McDonald IV	Jr.	ISU
DL	Eyioma Uwazurike	Sr.	ISU
DL	Felix Anudike-Uzomah	So.	KSU
DL	Brock Martin	Sr.	OSU
DL	Dante Stills	Sr.	WVU
LB	Terrel Bernard	Sr.	BU
LB	Mike Rose	Sr.	ISU
LB	Malcolm Rodriguez	Sr.	OSU
DB	Jalen Pitre	Sr.	BU
DB	Russ Yeast	Sr.	KSU
DB	Jarrick Bernard-Converse	Sr.	OSU
DB	Kolby Harvell-Peel	Sr.	OSU
DB	Tre'Vius Hodges-Tomlinson	Jr.	TCU
First Team Special Teams
PK	Jonathan Garibay	Sr.	TTU
P	Michael Turk	Sr.	OU
P	Cameron Dicker	Sr.	UT
RT	Trestan Ebner	Sr.	BU
RT	Malik Knowles	Jr.	KSU

Second Team

Position	Player	Class	Team
Second Team Offense
QB	Brock Purdy	Sr.	ISU
RB	Abram Smith	Sr.	BU
RB	Deuce Vaughn	So.	KSU
FB	Jax Dineen	Jr.	KSU
WR	Tyquan Thornton	Sr.	BU
WR	Tay Martin	Sr.	OSU
WR	Erik Ezukanma	Jr.	TTU
TE	Chase Allen	Sr.	ISU
OL	Colin Newell	Sr.	ISU
OL	Marquis Hayes	Sr.	OU
OL	Steve Avila	Jr.	TCU
OL	Dawson Deaton	Sr.	TTU
OL	Zach Frazier	So.	WVU
Second Team Defense
DL	Siaki Ika	So.	BU
DL	Kyron Johnson	Sr.	KU
DL	Isaiah Thomas	Sr.	OU
DL	Perrion Winfrey	Sr.	OU
DL	Collin Oliver	Fr.	OSU
DL	Ochaun Mathis	Jr.	TCU
LB	Brian Asamoah	Jr.	OU
LB	Nik Bonitto	Jr.	OU
LB	Colin Schooler	Sr.	TTU
DB	Isheem Young	So.	ISU
DB	Kenny Logan Jr.	Jr.	KU
DB	Delarrin Turner-Yell	Sr.	OU
DB	Christian Holmes	Sr.	OSU
DB	DaMarcus Fields	Sr.	TTU
Second Team Special Teams
PK	Gabe Brkic	Jr.	OU
P	Austin McNamara	Jr.	TTU
RT	Brennan Presley	So.	OSU
RT	Derius Davis	Sr.	TCU

(U) - Unanimous Selection

Honorable mentions

- BAYLOR: Gerry Bohanon (QB), Dillon Doyle (LB), TJ Franklin (DL), Jacob Gall (OL, ONoY), Siaki Ika (DLoY), Cole Maxwell (DL), Christian Morgan (DB), Xavier Newman-Johnson (OL), Ben Sims (TE), Abram Smith (OPoY), R.J. Sneed (WR), JT Woods (DB)
- IOWA STATE: Trevor Downing (OLoY), Greg Eisworth II (DB), Beau Freyler (DFoY), Jake Hummel (LB), Anthony Johnson (DB), Will McDonald IV (DPoY), Andrew Mevis (PK, STPoY), Zach Petersen (DL), Darrell Simmons (OL)
- KANSAS: Earl Bostick Jr. (OL), Kwamie Lassiter II (WR), Kenny Logan Jr. (DPoY), Devin Neal (RB, OFoY), Mike Novitsky (OL, OLoY, ONoY), Rich Miller (DNoY)
- KANSAS STATE: Felix Anudike-Uzomah (DPoY), Cooper Beebe (OLoY), Julius Brents (DB), Cody Fletcher (LB), Daniel Green (LB), Eli Huggins (DL), Noah Johnson (OL), Malik Knowles (WR, STPoY), Nate Matlack (DFoY), Jahron McPherson (DB), Josh Rivas (OL), Reggie Stubblefield (DB), Deuce Vaughn (OPoY), Russ Yeast (DNoY), Ty Zentner (P)
- OKLAHOMA: Gabe Brkic (STPoY), Pat Fields (DB), Key Lawrence (DB, DNoY), Marvin Mims (WR), Chris Murray (OL), Tyrese Robinson (OL, OLoY), Drake Stoops (WR), Danny Stutsman (DFoY), Caleb Williams (QB, OFoY, OPoY), Michael Woods II (ONoY)
- OKLAHOMA STATE: Tanner Brown (PK), Logan Carter (FB), Braden Cassity (TE), Danny Godlevske (OL), Blaine Green (OFoY), Devin Harper (LB), Tom Hutton (P, STPoY), Tyler Lacy (DL), Brock Martin (DLoY), Malcolm Rodriguez (DPoY), Josh Sills (OLoY), Jason Taylor II (DB), Jaylen Warren (RB, OPoY), Hunter Woodard (OL)
- TCU: Taye Barber (WR), Derius Davis (STPoY), Obinna Eze (ONoY), TreVius Hodges-Tomlinson (DPoY), Dylan Horton (DL), Quentin Johnston (OPoY)
- TEXAS: Cade Brewer (TE), Luke Brockermeyer (LB), Keondre Coburn (DL), Anthony Cook (DB), Cameron Dicker (PK, STPoY), B.J. Foster (DB), Byron Murphy II (DFoY), Ovie Oghoufo (DNoY), Moro Ojomo (DL), DeMarvion Overshown (LB), Bijan Robinson (OPoY), Keilan Robinson (ONoY)
- TEXAS TECH: Josh Burger (OL), Dawson Deaton (OLoY), Jonathan Garibay (STPoY), Kaylon Geiger (ONoY), Jaylon Hutchings (DL), Riko Jeffers (LB), Travis Koontz (TE), Reggie Pearson Jr. (DB), T.J. Storment (OL), Dadrion Taylor-Demerson (DB), Rayshad Williams (DB, DNoY), Tyree Wilson (DL)
- WEST VIRGINIA: Alonzo Addae (DB), Leddie Brown (RB), Josh Chandler-Semedo (LB), Zach Frazier (OLoY), Bryce Ford-Wheaton (WR), James Gmiter (OL), Casey Legg (PK, STPoY), Sean Mahone (DB), Akheem Mesidor (DL), Wyatt Milum (OL, OFoY), Dante Stills (DLoY), Tyler Sumpter (P), Winston Wright Jr. (KR/PR, WR)

=== All-Americans ===
Currently, the NCAA compiles consensus all-America teams in the sports of Division I-FBS football and Division I men's basketball using a point system computed from All-America teams named by coaches associations or media sources. The system consists of three points for a first-team honor, two points for second-team honor, and one point for third-team honor. Honorable mention and fourth team or lower recognitions are not accorded any points. College Football All-American consensus teams are compiled by position and the player accumulating the most points at each position is named first team consensus all-American. Currently, the NCAA recognizes All-Americans selected by the AP, AFCA, FWAA, TSN, and the WCFF to determine Consensus and Unanimous All-Americans. Any player named to the First Team by all five of the NCAA-recognized selectors is deemed a Unanimous All-American.

Position	Player	School	Selector	Unanimous	Consensus
First Team All-Americans

Position	Player	School	Selector	Unanimous	Consensus
Second Team All-Americans

Position	Player	School	Selector	Unanimous	Consensus
Third Team All-Americans

*AFCA All-America Team (AFCA)
*Walter Camp All-America Team
*AP All-America teams
*Sporting News All-America Team
*Football Writers Association of America All-America Team (FWAA)
*Sports Illustrated All-America Team
*Report All-America Team (BR)
*College Football News All-America Team (CFN)
*ESPN All-America Team
*CBS Sports All-America Team
*Athlon Sports All-America Team (Athlon)
*The Athletic All-America Team
*USA Today All-America Team

=== All-Academic ===
First team

Pos.	Name	School	Yr.	GPA	Major
QB					
RB					
RB					
WR					
WR					
TE					
OL					
OL					
OL					
OL					
OL					
DL					
DL					
DL					
DL					
LB					
LB					
LB					
DB					
DB					
DB					
DB					
PK					
P					
ST					

Second team

Pos.	Name	School	Yr.	GPA	Major
QB					
RB					
RB					
WR					
WR					
TE					
OL					
OL					
OL					
OL					
OL					
DL					
DL					
DL					
DL					
LB					
LB					
LB					
DB					
DB					
DB					
DB					
PK					
P					
ST					

Honorable mentions

- BAYLOR:
- IOWA STATE:
- KANSAS:
- KANSAS STATE:
- OKLAHOMA:
- OKLAHOMA STATE:
- TCU:
- TEXAS:
- TEXAS TECH:
- WEST VIRGINIA:

=== National award winners ===
2021 College Football Award Winners-->

== Home game attendance ==
Team	Stadium	Capacity	Game 1	Game 2	Game 3	Game 4	Game 5	Game 6	Game 7	Total	Average	% of capacity
Baylor	McLane Stadium	45,140	42,461	42,539	43,569	**48,016**†	**45,834**	**46,782**	43,901	313,102	44,729	99.09%
Iowa State	Jack Trice Stadium	61,500	61,500‡	61,500‡	60,446	61,500‡	61,500‡	57,775		364,221	60,704	98.70%
Kansas	David Booth Kansas Memorial Stadium	50,071	26,103	27,218	25,106	26,321	30,611†	23,117		158,476	26,413	52.75%
Kansas State	Bill Snyder Family Stadium	50,000	47,628	48,768†	47,690	48,363	44,339	43,932	43,857	324,577	46,368	92.74%
Oklahoma	Gaylord Family Oklahoma Memorial Stadium	86,112	42,206 (Note: This game was originally scheduled to be played at Yulman Stadium as a home game for Tulane, but was relocated to Norman due to Hurricane Ida)	83,538	84,659†	84,353	84,391	82,732	82,685	544,564	77,795	90.34%
Oklahoma State	Boone Pickens Stadium	55,509	50,807	52,127	51,444	52,144	55,026†	54,549	54,990	370,787	52,970	95.43%
TCU	Amon G. Carter Stadium	45,000	35,377	38,631	**46,672**†	43,337	37,288	40,338	35,061	276,704	39,529	87.84%
Texas	Darrell K Royal–Texas Memorial Stadium	95,594	91,113	91,978	**98,349**	**99,916**†	95,202	75,072		551,630	91,938	96.18%
Texas Tech	Jones AT&T Stadium	60,454	55,271	50,118	55,821†	52,874	47,158	53,169		314,411	52,402	86.68%
West Virginia	Milan Puskar Stadium	60,000	50,911	**60,222**†	54,090	45,613	50,109	48,775		309,720	51,620	86.03%

Bold – exceeded capacity
† Season high
‡ Record stadium Attendance

== NFL draft ==
The following list includes all Big 12 Players who were drafted in the 2022 NFL draft

Player	Position	School	Draft Round	Round Pick	Overall Pick	Team
Breece Hall	RB	Iowa State	2	4	36	New York Jets
Jalen Pitre	S	Baylor	2	5	37	Houston Texans
Tyquan Thornton	WR	Baylor	2	18	50	New England Patriots
Nik Bonitto	LB	Oklahoma	2	32	64	Denver Broncos
Brian Asamoah	LB	Oklahoma	3	2	66	Minnesota Vikings
JT Woods	S	Baylor	3	15	79	Los Angeles Chargers
Terrel Bernard	LB	Baylor	3	25	89	Buffalo Bills
Perrion Winfrey	DT	Oklahoma	4	3	108	Cleveland Browns
Eyioma Uwazurike	DT	Iowa State	4	11	116	Denver Broncos
Erik Ezukanma	WR	Texas Tech	4	20	125	Miami Dolphins
Charlie Kolar	TE	Iowa State	4	23	128	Baltimore Ravens
Delarrin Turner-Yell	S	Oklahoma	5	9	152	Denver Broncos
Kyron Johnson	LB	Kansas	6	2	181	Philadelphia Eagles
Malcolm Rodriguez	LB	Oklahoma State	6	9	188	Detroit Lions
Devin Harper	LB	Oklahoma State	6	14	193	Dallas Cowboys
Michael Woods II	WR	Oklahoma	6	23	202	Cleveland Browns
Trestan Ebner	RB	Baylor	6	24	203	Chicago Bears
Isaiah Thomas	DE	Oklahoma	7	2	223	Cleveland Browns
Christian Holmes	CB	Oklahoma State	7	19	240	Washington Commanders
Kalon Barnes	CB	Baylor	7	21	242	Carolina Panthers
Dawson Deaton	C	Texas Tech	7	25	246	Cleveland Browns
Skylar Thompson	QB	Kansas State	7	26	247	Miami Dolphins
Russ Yeast	S	Kansas State	7	32	253	Los Angeles Rams
Marquis Hayes	OG	Oklahoma	7	36	257	Arizona Cardinals
Brock Purdy	QB	Iowa State	7	41	262	San Francisco 49ers
