= 2021 All-Big 12 Conference football team =

The 2021 All-Big 12 Conference football team consists of American football players chosen as All-Big 12 Conference players for the 2021 Big 12 Conference football season. The conference recognizes two official All-Big 12 selectors: (1) the Big 12 conference coaches selected separate offensive and defensive units and named first- and second-team players (the "Coaches" team); and (2) a panel of sports writers and broadcasters covering the Big 12 also selected offensive and defensive units and named first- and second-team players (the "Media" team).

== Offensive selections ==
=== Quarterbacks ===
- Spencer Sanders, Oklahoma State (Coaches-1)
- Brock Purdy, Iowa State (Coaches-2; Media-1)
- Caleb Williams, Oklahoma (Media-2)

=== Running backs ===
- Breece Hall, Iowa State (Coaches-1; Media-1)
- Bijan Robinson, Texas (Coaches-1; Media-1)
- Abram Smith, Baylor (Coaches-2; Media-2)
- Deuce Vaughn, Kansas State (Coaches-2; Media-2)

=== Fullbacks ===
- Jeremiah Hall, Oklahoma (Coaches-1)
- Jared Rus, Iowa State (Coaches-1)
- Jax Dineen, Kansas State (Coaches-2)

=== Centers ===
- Steve Avila, TCU (Coaches-2; Media-1)
- Collin Newell, Iowa State (Coaches-2)
- Jacob Gall, Baylor (Media-2)
- Dawson Deaton, Texas Tech (Coaches-2)
- Zach Frazier, West Virginia (Coaches-2)

=== Guards ===
- Josh Sills, Oklahoma State (Coaches-1; Media-1)
- Trevor Downing, Iowa State (Coaches-1; Media-1)
- Marquis Hayes, Oklahoma (Coaches-2; Media-2)
- Chris Murray, Oklahoma (Media-2)

=== Tackles ===
- Cooper Beebe, Kansas State (Coaches-1; Media-1)
- Connor Galvin, Baylor (Coaches-1; Media-1)
- Derek Kerstetter, Texas (Coaches-1; Media-2)
- Tyrese Robinson, Oklahoma (Media-2)

=== Tight ends ===
- Charlie Kolar, Iowa State (Coaches-1; Media-1)
- Chase Allen, Iowa State (Coaches-2)
- Jeremiah Hall, Oklahoma (Media-2)

=== Receivers ===
- Xavier Hutchinson, Iowa State (Coaches-1; Media-1)
- Xavier Worthy, Texas (Coaches-1; Media-1)
- Quentin Johnston, TCU (Coaches-1)
- Tay Martin, Oklahoma State (Coaches-2; Media-2)
- Tyquan Thornton, Baylor (Coaches-2; Media-2)
- Erik Ezukanma, Texas Tech (Coaches-2)

== Defensive selections ==
=== Defensive linemen ===
- Felix Anudike-Uzomah, Kansas State (Coaches-1; Media-1)
- Will McDonald IV, Iowa State (Coaches-1; Media-1)
- Dante Stills, West Virginia (Coaches-1; Media-1)
- Brock Martin, Oklahoma State (Coaches-1; Media-2)
- Eyioma Uwazurike, Iowa State (Coaches-1; Media-2)
- Siaki Ika, Baylor (Coaches-2; Media-1)
- Perrion Winfrey, Oklahoma (Coaches-2; Media-2)
- Collin Oliver, Oklahoma State (Coaches-2; Media-2)
- Kyron Johnson, Kansas (Coaches-2)
- Ochaun Mathis, TCU (Coaches-2)
- Isaiah Thomas, Oklahoma (Coaches-2)

=== Linebackers ===
- Terrel Bernard, Baylor (Coaches-1; Media-1)
- Malcolm Rodriguez, Oklahoma State (Coaches-1; Media-1)
- Mike Rose, Iowa State (Coaches-1; Media-1)
- Brian Asamoah, Oklahoma (Coaches-2; Media-2)
- Nik Bonitto, Oklahoma (Coaches-2; Media-2)
- Colin Schooler, Texas Tech (Coaches-2; Media-2)

=== Defensive backs ===
- Jarrick Bernard-Converse, Oklahoma State (Coaches-1; Media-1)
- Kolby Harvell-Peel, Oklahoma State (Coaches-1; Media-1)
- Tre Tomlinson, TCU (Coaches-1; Media-1)
- Jalen Pitre, Baylor (Coaches-1; Media-1)
- Russ Yeast, Kansas State (Coaches-1; Media-2)
- DaMarcus Fields, Texas Tech (Coaches-2; Media-2)
- Christian Holmes, Oklahoma State (Coaches-2; Media-2)
- Kenny Logan Jr., Kansas (Coaches-2; Media-2)
- Delarrin Turner-Yell, Oklahoma (Coaches-2)
- Isheem Young, Iowa State (Coaches-2)

== Special teams ==
=== Kickers ===
- Jonathan Garibay, Texas Tech (Coaches-1; Media-1)
- Gabe Brkic, Oklahoma (Coaches-2; Media-2)

=== Punters ===
- Michael Turk, Oklahoma (Coaches-1; Media-1)
- Cameron Dicker, Texas (Coaches-1)
- Austin McNamara, Texas Tech (Coaches-2; Media-2)

=== All-purpose / Return specialists ===
- Trestan Ebner, Baylor (Coaches-1; Media-1)
- Malik Knowles, Kansas State (Coaches-1; Media-2)
- Derius Davis, TCU (Coaches-2;
- Brennan Presley, Oklahoma State (Coaches-2;

== Key ==
Bold = selected as a first-team player by both the coaches and media panel

Coaches = selected by Big 12 Conference coaches

Media = selected by a media panel

== See also ==
- 2021 College Football All-America Team
