= 2020 All-Big 12 Conference football team =

The 2020 All-Big 12 Conference football team consists of American football players chosen as All-Big 12 Conference players for the 2020 Big 12 Conference football season. The conference recognizes two official All-Big 12 selectors: (1) the Big 12 conference coaches selected separate offensive and defensive units and named first- and second-team players (the "Coaches" team); and (2) a panel of sports writers and broadcasters covering the Big 12 also selected offensive and defensive units and named first- and second-team players (the "Media" team).

== Offensive selections ==
=== Quarterbacks ===
- Sam Ehlinger, Texas (Coaches-2)
- Brock Purdy, Iowa State (Coaches-1; Media-2)
- Spencer Rattler, Oklahoma (Media-1)

=== Running backs ===
- Leddie Brown, West Virginia (Coaches-1; Media-1)
- Breece Hall, Iowa State (Coaches-1; Media-1)
- Chuba Hubbard, Oklahoma State (Coaches-2; Media-2)

=== Fullbacks ===
- Jeremiah Hall, Oklahoma (Coaches-1)
- Briley Moore, Kansas State (Coaches-2)

=== Centers ===
- Creed Humphrey, Oklahoma (Coaches-1; Media-1)
- Colin Newell, Iowa State (Coaches-1; Media-2)

=== Guards ===
- Jack Anderson, Texas Tech (Coaches-1; Media-1)
- Michael Brown, West Virginia (Coaches-2; Media-2)
- Derek Schweiger, Iowa State (Coaches-2; Media-2)
- Josh Sills, Oklahoma State (Media-1)

=== Tackles ===
- Sam Cosmi, Texas (Coaches-1; Media-1)
- Teven Jenkins, Oklahoma State (Coaches-1; Media-1)
- Dawson Deaton, Texas Tech (Coaches-2)
- Adrian Ealy, Oklahoma (Coaches-2; Media-2)
- Noah Johnson, Kansas State (Coaches-2)
- T.J. Storment, TCU (Media-2)

=== Tight ends ===
- Charlie Kolar, Iowa State (Coaches-1; Media-1)
- Chase Allen, Iowa State (Coaches-2)
- Austin Stogner, Oklahoma (Media-2)

=== Receivers ===
- Erik Ezukanma, Texas Tech (Coaches-1; Media-1)
- Tylan Wallace, Oklahoma State (Coaches-1; Media-1)
- Xavier Hutchinson, Iowa State (Coaches-1; Media-2)
- Marvin Mims, Oklahoma (Coaches-2; Media-2)
- R. J. Sneed, Baylor (Coaches-2)
- Winston Wright Jr., West Virginia (Coaches-2)

== Defensive selections ==
=== Defensive linemen ===
- JaQuan Bailey, Iowa State (Coaches-1; Media-1)
- Wyatt Hubert, Kansas State (Coaches-1; Media-1)
- Darius Stills, West Virginia (Coaches-1; Media-1)
- Ochaun Mathis, TCU (Coaches-2; Media-2)
- Akheem Mesidor, West Virginia (Coaches-2)
- Will McDonald IV, Iowa State (Coaches-1; Media-2)
- Joseph Ossai, Texas (Coaches-1; Media-2)
- Ronnie Perkins, Oklahoma (Coaches-2)
- Dante Stills, West Virginia (Media-2)
- Isaiah Thomas, Oklahoma (Coaches-2; Media-1)
- Drew Wiley, Kansas State (Media-2)
- Perrion Winfrey, Oklahoma (Coaches-2)

=== Linebackers ===
- Tony Fields II, West Virginia (Coaches-1; Media-1)
- Mike Rose, Iowa State (Coaches-1; Media-1)
- Garret Wallow, TCU (Coaches-1; Media-1)
- Terrel Bernard, Baylor (Coaches-2; Media-2)
- Nik Bonitto, Oklahoma (Media-2)
- Amen Ogbongbemiga, Oklahoma State (Coaches-2; Media-2)
- Malcolm Rodriguez, Oklahoma State (Coaches-2)

=== Defensive backs ===
- Tre Tomlinson, TCU (Coaches-1; Media-1)
- Trevon Moehrig, TCU (Coaches-1; Media-1)
- Jalen Pitre, Baylor (Coaches-1; Media-1)
- Zech McPhearson, Texas Tech (Coaches-1; Media-1)
- Greg Eisworth, Iowa State (Coaches-1; Media-2)
- Tre Brown, Oklahoma (Coaches-2; Media-2)
- Rodarius Williams, Oklahoma State (Coaches-2; Media-2)
- Alonzo Addae, West Virginia (Coaches-2)
- Chris Brown, Texas (Coaches-2)
- Kolby Harvell-Peel, Oklahoma State (Coaches-2)
- Tykee Smith, West Virginia (Media-2)

== Special teams ==
=== Kickers ===
- Gabe Brkic, Oklahoma (Coaches-1; Media-1)
- Cameron Dicker, Texas (Coaches-2; Media-2)

=== Punters ===
- Austin McNamara, Texas Tech (Coaches-1; Media-1)
- Jordy Sandy, TCU (Coaches-2; Media-2)

=== All-purpose / Return specialists ===
- Phillip Brooks, Kansas State (Coaches-1)
- Trestan Ebner, Baylor (Coaches-2; Media-1)
- Deuce Vaughn, Kansas State (Media-2)

== Key ==
Bold = selected as a first-team player by both the coaches and media panel

Coaches = selected by Big 12 Conference coaches

Media = selected by a media panel

== See also ==
- 2020 College Football All-America Team
