= Connor Galvin =

American football player (born 2000)

Profile
- Position: Offensive tackle

Personal information
- Born: March 11, 2000 (age 26); Katy, Texas, U.S.
- Listed height: 6 ft 7 in (2.01 m)
- Listed weight: 305 lb (138 kg)

Career information
- High school: Katy
- College: Baylor (2018–2022)
- NFL draft: 2023: undrafted

Career history
- Detroit Lions (2023–2024)

Awards and highlights
- Big 12 Offensive Lineman of the Year (2021); 2× First-team All-Big 12 (2021, 2022)

Career NFL statistics as of 2024
- Games played: 1
- Stats at Pro Football Reference

Connor Galvin (born March 11, 2000) is an American former professional football player who was an offensive tackle for the Detroit Lions of the National Football League (NFL). He played college football for the Baylor Bears.

== Early life ==
Galvin grew up in Texas and attended Katy High School, winning a state title as a sophomore starter in 2015 and serving as a senior team captain in 2017 on a 12-1 team that made the state semi-finals. He was a four-star prospect according to ESPN, while being rated three stars by Rivals.com and 247Sports. He was rated the 18th-best offensive tackle according to ESPN and the 488th best player overall according to 247Sports.

== College career ==
Galvin committed to Baylor University over scholarship offers from UCLA, Florida, TCU, and Colorado. As a freshman, he played in all thirteen games, starting six at left tackle. His first start came against West Virginia.

In his sophomore season, Galvin played in ten games, missing four due to injury, being a starter in nine. He started the first five games of the year before suffering an injury, coming back for their game against Oklahoma. He was a starter in the final four games of the year.

As a junior, Galvin was named Preseason All-Big 12 Conference and started eight games at left tackle.

After his senior season, Galvin was named third-team All-American by Associated Press and was named the Big 12 Offensive Lineman of the Year.

Rather than declare for the NFL draft, Galvin announced that he would return to the team in 2022 as a fifth-year player.

== Professional career ==
Pre-draft measurables
Height	Weight	Arm length	Hand span	40-yard dash	10-yard split	20-yard split	20-yard shuttle	Three-cone drill	Vertical jump	Broad jump	Bench press
6 ft 6 5/8 in (2.00 m)	293 lb (133 kg)	32 3/8 in (0.82 m)	9 in (0.23 m)	5.48 s	1.81 s	3.07 s	4.92 s	8.00 s	30.5 in (0.77 m)	8 ft 8 in (2.64 m)	29 reps
All values from NFL Combine

Following the conclusion of the 2023 NFL draft, the Detroit Lions signed Galvin as a undrafted free agent. He was waived on August 29, 2023 and re-signed to the practice squad. He signed a reserve/future contract on January 30, 2024.

Galvin suffered a torn MCL in the preseason and was waived/injured on August 11, 2024. Galvin was waived by the Lions in March 2025 and has yet to sign on with a team for the 2025 season.
