= Christian Holmes =

American football player (born 1997)

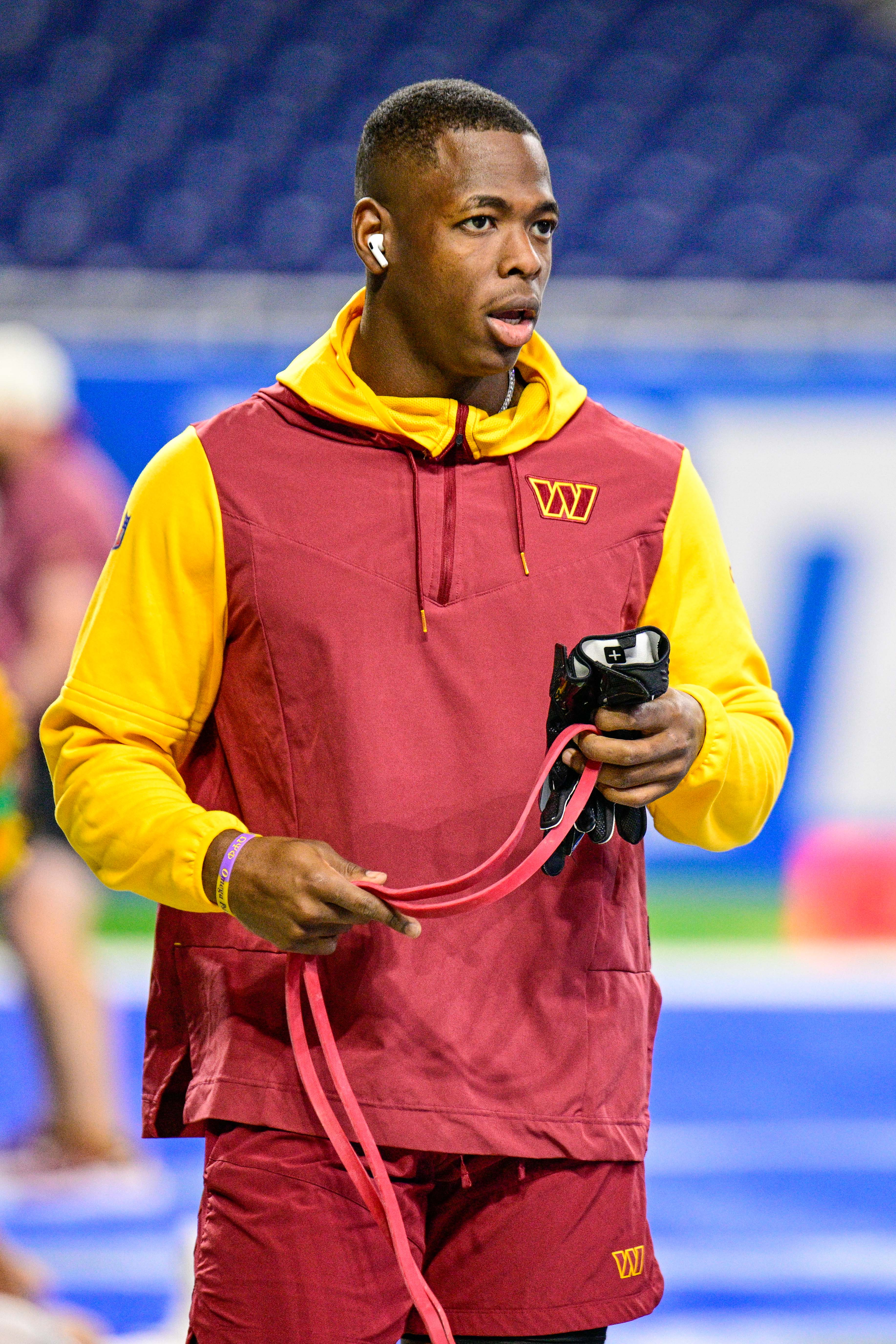
- Holmes with the Washington Commanders in 2022

Profile
- Position: Cornerback

Personal information
- Born: September 14, 1997 (age 29); Leland, Mississippi, U.S.
- Listed height: 6 ft 1 in (1.85 m)
- Listed weight: 205 lb (93 kg)

Career information
- High school: McNair (Atlanta, Georgia)
- College: Missouri (2016–2019); Oklahoma State (2020–2021)
- NFL draft: 2022: 7th round, 240th overall pick

Career history
- Washington Commanders (2022–2023); New York Giants (2024)*; Cleveland Browns (2025)*
- * Offseason or practice squad member only

Awards and highlights
- Second-team All-Big 12 (2021)

Career NFL statistics as of 2025
- Tackles: 20
- Pass deflections: 1
- Fumble recoveries: 2
- Stats at Pro Football Reference

Christian Holmes (born September 14, 1997) is an American professional football cornerback. He played college football for the Missouri Tigers and Oklahoma State Cowboys and was selected by the Washington Commanders in the seventh round of the 2022 NFL draft.

== Early life ==
Holmes played cornerback and wide receiver for McNair High School in Atlanta, Georgia. He committed to play college football at the University of Missouri.

== College career ==
=== Missouri Tigers ===
As a true freshman for the Missouri Tigers, he played minimally in 10 games and recorded only a single tackle. He redshirted his second season due to a shoulder injury in a pre-season scrimmage. He played in 13 games as a redshirt sophomore and started eight, recording 12 pass break-ups and two interceptions, one of which he returned for a touchdown. Holmes would transfer to Oklahoma State in February 2020.

=== Oklahoma State Cowboys ===
In his first season with Oklahoma State, Holmes would play in all 11 games and started the final 2. He had 25 total tackles, and 6 broken-up passes. He would start 13 games in his final collegiate season, including the 2021 Big 12 Championship Game, and was named to the All-Big 12 Conference second-team by the Associated Press while also receiving All-Big 12 Academic honors. Holmes finished the season with 39 tackles, an interception, and seven pass-breakups.

== Professional career ==
Pre-draft measurables
Height	Weight	Arm length	Hand span	40-yard dash	10-yard split	20-yard split	20-yard shuttle	Three-cone drill	Vertical jump	Broad jump	Bench press
6 ft 0 in (1.83 m)	201 lb (91 kg)	31 1/4 in (0.79 m)	9 1/2 in (0.24 m)	4.54 s	1.52 s	2.53 s	4.15 s	7.25 s	39.0 in (0.99 m)	10 ft 6 in (3.20 m)	16 reps

=== Washington Commanders ===
Holmes was selected by the Washington Commanders in the seventh round (240th overall) of the 2022 NFL draft. He signed his four-year rookie contract on May 6, 2022.

In Week 6 against the Chicago Bears, Holmes made a key special teams play in the fourth quarter when he recovered a muffed punt by Chicago returner Velus Jones Jr. on the Bears six-yard line. This would lead to the Commanders' only touchdown in their 12-7 victory over the Bears. He was released on August 4, 2024.

=== New York Giants ===
On August 5, 2024, Holmes was claimed off waivers by the New York Giants. He was waived on August 25.

=== Cleveland Browns ===
On August 11, 2025, Holmes signed with the Cleveland Browns. He was waived by the Browns on August 24.
