= Perrion Winfrey =

American football player (born 2000)

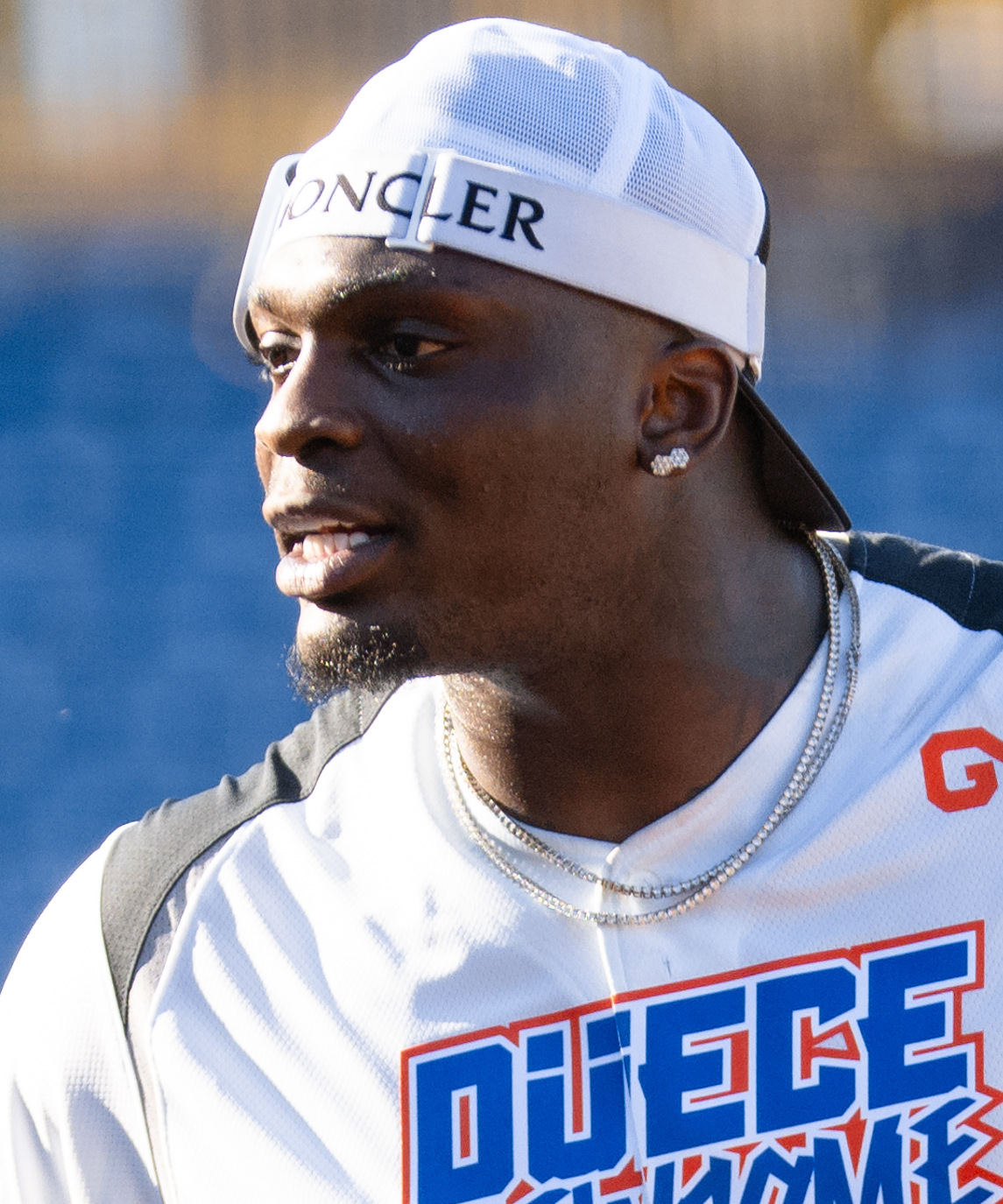
- Winfrey at Classic Park in 2023

Profile
- Position: Defensive tackle

Personal information
- Born: August 15, 2000 (age 26); Maywood, Illinois, U.S.
- Listed height: 6 ft 4 in (1.93 m)
- Listed weight: 290 lb (132 kg)

Career information
- High school: Lake Park (Roselle, Illinois)
- College: Iowa Western (2018–2019); Oklahoma (2020–2021)
- NFL draft: 2022: 4th round, 108th overall pick

Career history
- Cleveland Browns (2022); New York Jets (2023); Birmingham Stallions (2025); Dallas Cowboys (2025); Birmingham Stallions (2026); Columbus Aviators (2026)

Awards and highlights
- All-UFL Team (2025); 2× Second-team All-Big 12 (2020, 2021)

Career NFL statistics as of 2025
- Total tackles: 27
- Sacks: 0.5
- Pass deflections: 2
- Stats at Pro Football Reference

Perrion Winfrey (/ˈpɛriɒn/ PERR-ee-on; born August 15, 2000) is an American professional football defensive tackle. He played college football at Iowa Western and Oklahoma, and was selected by the Cleveland Browns in the fourth round of the 2022 NFL draft.

== Early life ==
Winfrey grew up in Maywood, Illinois, and attended Lake Park High School in Roselle, Illinois. Winfrey was rated a three-star prospect, but was not heavily recruited after failing to qualify academically to play NCAA Division I football.

== College career ==
Winfrey began his collegiate career at Iowa Western Community College at the recommendation of coaches at Iowa State. Over two seasons he recorded 55 tackles with 23 tackles for loss and 9.5 sacks. Winfrey was rated the best junior college prospect in the nation by 247Sports.com and committed to transfer to Oklahoma over offers from Alabama, Baylor, LSU, and Texas.

In his first year at Oklahoma, Winfrey played in all 11 of the Sooners' games and became a starter at defensive tackle. He was named second-team All-Big 12 Conference by the league's coaches after recording 19 tackles, six for loss, and three pass breakups. After the season Winfrey considered entering the 2021 NFL draft, but opted to return to Oklahoma for his senior season.

== Professional career ==
Pre-draft measurables
Height	Weight	Arm length	Hand span	Wingspan	40-yard dash	10-yard split	20-yard split
6 ft 3 5/8 in (1.92 m)	290 lb (132 kg)	35 1/4 in (0.90 m)	10 1/4 in (0.26 m)	7 ft 0 3/4 in (2.15 m)	4.89 s	1.68 s	2.85 s
All values from NFL Combine

=== Cleveland Browns ===
Winfrey was selected by the Cleveland Browns with the 108th overall pick in the fourth round of the 2022 NFL draft. Winfrey appeared in 13 games as a rookie. He had .5 sacks, 22 total tackles, and two passes defensed.

On July 19, 2023, Winfrey was waived by the Browns after being investigated for threatening and pulling a gun on a woman in Cleveland.

=== New York Jets ===
On November 7, 2023, Winfrey was signed to the practice squad of the New York Jets. He only played in the Week 13 game against the Atlanta Falcons, where he made 3 tackles. He was not signed to a reserve/future contract after the season and thus became a free agent upon the expiration of his practice squad contract.

=== Birmingham Stallions (first stint) ===
On October 3, 2024, Winfrey was signed by the Birmingham Stallions of the United Football League (UFL). He was named to the All-UFL Team in 2025.

=== Dallas Cowboys ===
Winfrey signed with the Dallas Cowboys on June 18, 2025. He was the only UFL player from the 2025 UFL season to make an opening day 53-man roster the same year. He was placed on injured reserve on September 8, due to a back injury. The defensive tackle position experienced changes during the season with the additions of Kenny Clark and Quinnen Williams, who were integrated into a group that already had Osa Odighizuwa, Solomon Thomas and rookie Jay Toia. There weren’t many defensive snaps left for Winfrey when he was activated from injured reserve on November 18, ahead of the team's Week 12 matchup against the Philadelphia Eagles. He was declared inactive in 7 games and only played in the Week 16 contest against the Los Angeles Chargers, where he made 2 tackles.

Winfrey was released by the Cowboys on March 5, 2026.

=== Birmingham Stallions (second stint) ===
On April 2, 2026, Winfrey re-signed with the Birmingham Stallions of the United Football League (UFL). He was released on April 19, per his request.

=== Columbus Aviators ===
On April 21, 2026, Winfrey was claimed by the Columbus Aviators of the United Football League (UFL). He was released by the Aviators on May 14.

== Legal issues ==
On April 10, 2023, Winfrey was arrested on a misdemeanor assault charge in Harris County, Texas. On July 19, 2023, Fox 8 Cleveland announced that Winfrey was under investigation by Cleveland police for allegedly pulling a gun on a woman and threatening her in Cleveland.
