= Isaiah Thomas (American football) =

American football player (born 1998)

Profile
- Position: Defensive end

Personal information
- Born: December 3, 1998 (age 27); Tulsa, Oklahoma, U.S.
- Listed height: 6 ft 5 in (1.96 m)
- Listed weight: 266 lb (121 kg)

Career information
- High school: Memorial (Tulsa)
- College: Oklahoma (2017–2021)
- NFL draft: 2022: 7th round, 223rd overall pick

Career history
- Cleveland Browns (2022–2023); Cincinnati Bengals (2024)*; Detroit Lions (2024); Cincinnati Bengals (2024–2025)
- * Offseason or practice squad member only

Awards and highlights
- 2× Second-team All-Big 12 (2020, 2021)

Career NFL statistics as of 2024
- Total tackles: 12
- Sacks: 1
- Fumble recoveries: 2
- Pass deflections: 2
- Stats at Pro Football Reference

Isaiah Thomas (born December 3, 1998) is an American professional football defensive end. He has previously played for the Cleveland Browns and Detroit Lions. He played college football for the Oklahoma Sooners.

== Professional career ==
Pre-draft measurables
Height	Weight	Arm length	Hand span	Wingspan	40-yard dash	10-yard split	20-yard split	Vertical jump	Broad jump	Bench press
6 ft 4 7/8 in (1.95 m)	266 lb (121 kg)	33 1/4 in (0.84 m)	10 1/4 in (0.26 m)	6 ft 7 3/4 in (2.03 m)	4.70 s	1.66 s	2.72 s	31.5 in (0.80 m)	9 ft 9 in (2.97 m)	23 reps
All values from NFL Combine/Pro Day

=== Cleveland Browns ===
Thomas was selected by the Cleveland Browns with the 223rd overall pick in the seventh round of the 2022 NFL draft. He made his debut against the Atlanta Falcons in Week 4 of the 2022 season.

In Week 7 at the Baltimore Ravens, Thomas recorded 1 pass defended, 2 tackles, 2 assisted tackles, and a fumble recovery after Ravens' running back Justice Hill fumbled the ball. In Week 8 against the Bengals, Thomas recorded 1 pass defended, 1 tackle, and 2 assisted tackles. He also recorded his first career sack on quarterback Joe Burrow for a loss of 10 yards on 3rd down.

On August 29, 2023, Thomas was waived by the Browns and re-signed to the practice squad the following day. He signed a reserve/future contract on January 15, 2024.

On August 26, 2024, Thomas was waived by the Browns as part of final roster cuts.

=== Cincinnati Bengals (first stint) ===
On August 29, 2024, Thomas was signed to the Cincinnati Bengals' practice squad.

=== Detroit Lions ===
On October 15, 2024, Thomas was signed to the Detroit Lions' active roster from the Bengals' practice squad. He was waived on November 9, and re-signed to the practice squad on November 12. He was released on December 17.

=== Cincinnati Bengals (second stint) ===
On December 18, 2024, the Cincinnati Bengals signed Thomas to their practice squad, and promoted him to the active roster five days later.

On August 26, 2025, Thomas was waived by the Bengals as part of final roster cuts and re-signed to the practice squad the following day. He was released on September 9.
