= TJ Storment =

American football player (born 1997)

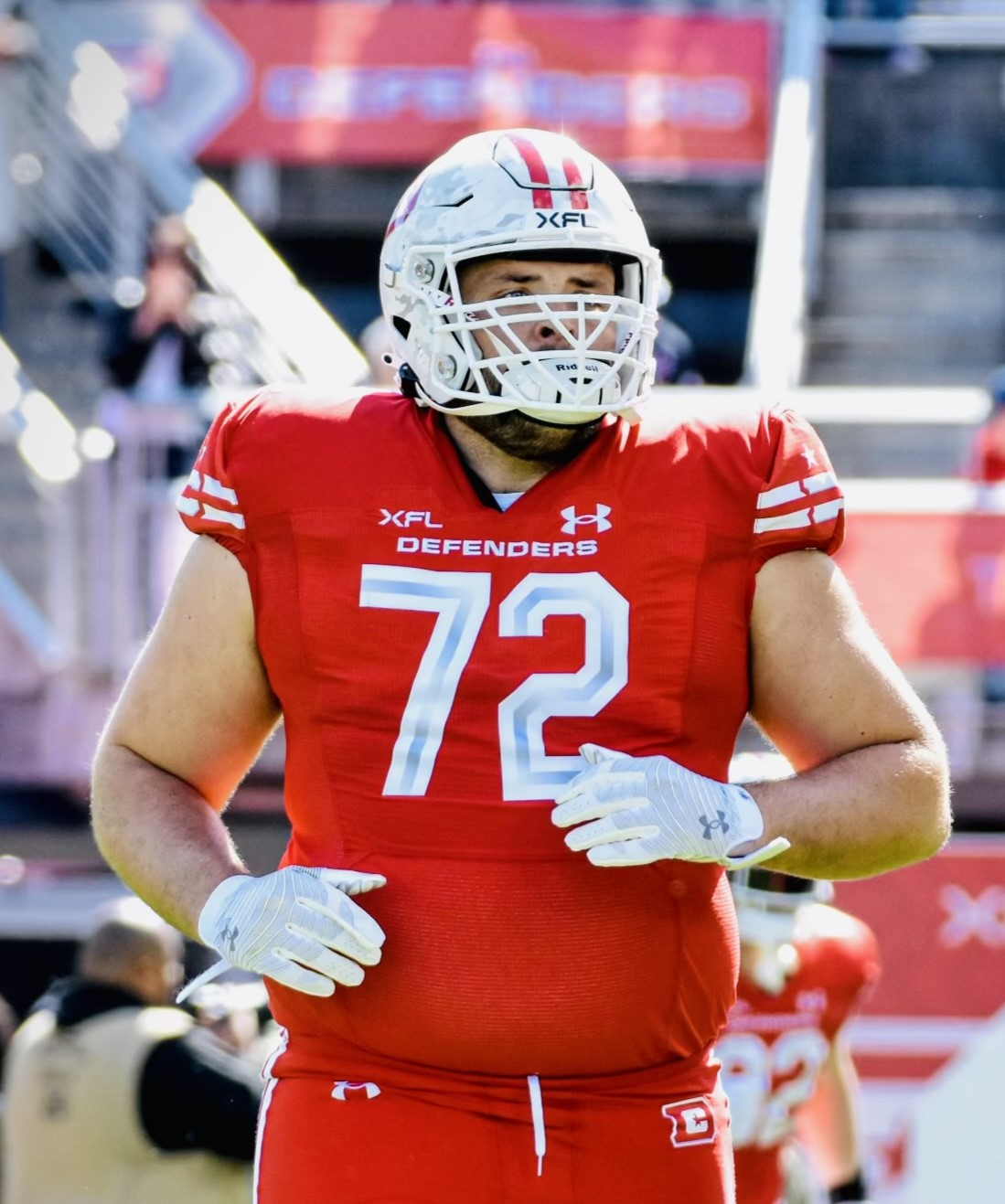
- Storment with the DC Defenders in 2023

No. 72
- Position: Offensive tackle

Personal information
- Born: October 28, 1997 (age 29); Statesville, North Carolina, U.S.
- Listed height: 6 ft 7 in (2.01 m)
- Listed weight: 320 lb (145 kg)

Career information
- High school: Statesville
- College: Old Dominion (2017) Fullerton (2018); Colorado State (2019); TCU (2020) Texas Tech (2021)
- NFL draft: 2022: undrafted

Career history
- Saskatchewan Roughriders (2022); DC Defenders (2023); Orlando Guardians (2023); Edmonton Elks (2024)*
- * Offseason or practice squad member only

TJ Storment (born October 28, 1997) is an American former professional football offensive tackle. He played college football at Old Domininion, Fullerton, Colorado State, TCU, and Texas Tech. Storment has been a member of the Saskatchewan Roughriders and Edmonton Elks of the Canadian Football League (CFL), and the DC Defenders, and Orlando Guardians of the XFL.

== College career ==
=== Old Dominion University ===
Storment was a redshirt freshman at Old Dominion University. In 2017, he played as a right tackle in five games.

=== Fullerton ===
Storment completed his sophomore season at Fullerton College. During the 2018 junior college season, he earned first-team All-SCFE Honors (Southern South California Football Association).

=== Colorado State ===
Storment moved on to complete his junior season at Colorado State University, starting in all 12 games at left tackle.

=== TCU ===
Storment then received an offer from Texas Christian University (TCU). Throughout the pandemic year, Storment appeared in nine games in his season as a Horned Frog. He completed the year with seven starts at left tackle, and TCU had a 5–2 record with him as the starter for the final seven games of the season. Storment earned second-team All-Big 12 honors by the Associated Press.

=== Texas Tech ===
In 2021, Storment transferred to Texas Tech University, where he started 12 of 13 games at left tackle, including the 2021 Liberty Bowl, which Texas Tech won against Mississippi State.

== Professional career ==
=== Saskatchewan Roughriders ===
Storment went undrafted in the 2022 NFL draft, but attended NFL minicamps for the Baltimore Ravens, and the New York Giants. He was invited back to the Ravens camp. After his time in Baltimore, Storment was signed by Saskatchewan Roughriders of the Canadian Football League on September 26, 2022, but was released later in the year.

=== DC Defenders ===
Storment was drafted by the DC Defenders with the 8th pick in the first round of the 2023 XFL draft. Storment started in DC's first three games at offensive tackle.

=== Orlando Guardians ===
On March 6, 2023, Storment was traded to the Orlando Guardians of the XFL in a three-team trade, with the DC Defenders receiving Tight End Alex Ellis, and the Arlington Renegades receiving Wide Receiver JaVonta Payton. Storment's last game of the season was in week 7 when the Orlando Guardians defeated the DC Defenders. Following the game, he was placed on the reserve list due to an injury.

=== Edmonton Elks ===
On April 30, 2024, Storment signed with the Edmonton Elks of the Canadian Football League (CFL). He was released on May 15.

== Personal life ==
Storment is from Statesville, North Carolina. Storment is a Christian and has been vocal about his faith throughout his interviews.

In addition to his football career, Storment is also a professional poker player. Notably, in November 2022, Storment won a WSOP (World Series Of Poker) circuit event ring at Chocktaw Casino in Durant, Oklahoma.
