= Mike Rose (American football) =

American football player (born 2000)

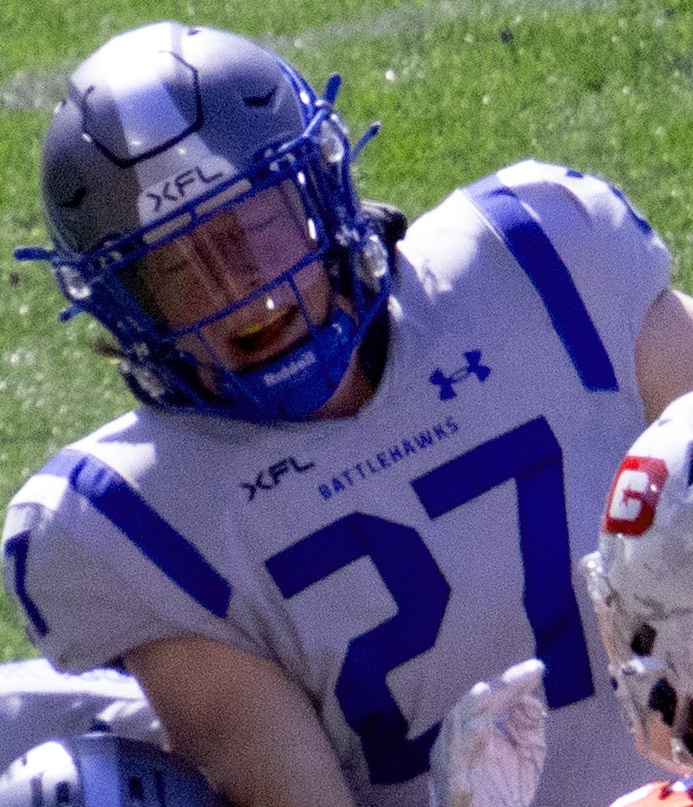
- Rose with the St. Louis BattleHawks in 2023

Profile
- Position: Linebacker

Personal information
- Born: May 25, 2000 (age 26); Brecksville, Ohio, U.S.
- Listed height: 6 ft 4 in (1.93 m)
- Listed weight: 250 lb (113 kg)

Career information
- High school: Brecksville–Broadview Heights
- College: Iowa State (2018–2021)
- NFL draft: 2022: undrafted

Career history
- Kansas City Chiefs (2022)*; St. Louis BattleHawks (2023); Miami Dolphins (2023)*; St. Louis BattleHawks (2024); New Orleans Saints (2024)*; St. Louis BattleHawks (2025)
- * Offseason or practice squad member only

Awards and highlights
- Big 12 Defensive Player of the Year (2020); 2× First-team All-Big 12 (2020, 2021)
- Stats at Pro Football Reference

Michael Rose (born May 25, 2000) is an American professional football linebacker. He played college football at Iowa State.

== Early life ==
Rose grew up in Brecksville, Ohio, and attended Brecksville–Broadview Heights High School, where he played basketball and football. He recorded 82 tackles, 10 tackles for a loss, and two interceptions and was named second-team All-Suburban League during his junior season. Rose had 53 tackles and 10 tackles for loss in seven games and was named first-team all-conference as a senior. He committed to Iowa State after receiving a late scholarship; Rose had previously been committed to play at Ball State.

== College career ==
Rose became a starter at linebacker for Iowa State as a true freshman and was named honorable mention All-Big 12 Conference and a Freshman All-American by the FWAA after finishing the season with 75 tackles, nine tackles for loss, 1.5 sacks and a fumble recovery. He had 77 tackles, 9.5 tackles for loss, and 3.5 sacks with three passes broken up and an interception and was again named honorable mention All-Big 12 in his sophomore season. Rose was named first-team All-Big 12 and the conference Defensive Player of the Year as a junior.

== Professional career ==
Pre-draft measurables
| Height | Weight | Arm length | Hand span | Wingspan | 40-yard dash | 10-yard split | 20-yard split | 20-yard shuttle | Three-cone drill | Vertical jump | Broad jump | Bench press |
|---|---|---|---|---|---|---|---|---|---|---|---|---|
| 6 ft 3 7/8 in (1.93 m) | 245 lb (111 kg) | 33 1/4 in (0.84 m) | 10 1/8 in (0.26 m) | 6 ft 6 3/4 in (2.00 m) | 4.70 s | 1.62 s | 2.70 s | 4.20 s | 6.94 s | 34.0 in (0.86 m) | 10 ft 1 in (3.07 m) | 16 reps |
All values from NFL Combine/Pro Day

=== Kansas City Chiefs ===
Rose signed with the Kansas City Chiefs as an undrafted free agent on May 7, 2022. He was waived on August 27, 2022.

=== St. Louis BattleHawks ===
On November 17, 2022, Rose was drafted by the St. Louis BattleHawks of the XFL. He was released from his contract on August 2, 2023.

=== Miami Dolphins ===
On August 3, 2023, Rose signed with the Miami Dolphins. He was waived on August 24, 2023.

=== St. Louis Battlehawks (second stint) ===
On December 20, 2023, Rose re-signed with the St. Louis Battlehawks. His contract was terminated on August 6, 2024.

=== New Orleans Saints ===
Rose signed with the New Orleans Saints on August 6, 2024. He was waived on August 27.

=== St. Louis Battlehawks (third stint) ===
On January 7, 2025, Rose re-signed with the St. Louis BattleHawks of the United Football League (UFL).
