= Marquis Hayes =

American football player (born 1999)

Profile
- Position: Guard

Personal information
- Born: February 14, 1999 (age 27); St. Louis, Missouri, U.S.
- Listed height: 6 ft 5 in (1.96 m)
- Listed weight: 318 lb (144 kg)

Career information
- High school: Pattonville (Maryland Heights, Missouri)
- College: Oklahoma (2017–2021)
- NFL draft: 2022: 7th round, 257th overall pick

Career history
- Arizona Cardinals (2022–2024); Washington Commanders (2024)*; Green Bay Packers (2024)*; New York Jets (2025)
- * Offseason or practice squad member only

Awards and highlights
- Second-team All-Big 12 (2021)
- Stats at Pro Football Reference

Marquis Hayes Jr. (born February 14, 1999) is an American professional football guard. He played college football for the Oklahoma Sooners and was selected by the Arizona Cardinals in the seventh round of the 2022 NFL draft. Hayes has also been a member of the Washington Commanders , Green Bay Packers, and New York Jets.

== Early life ==
Hayes was born on February 14, 1999, in St. Louis, Missouri, later attending Pattonville High School in Maryland Heights, Missouri. He did not play on the varsity football team until his junior year. Hayes was rated a four-star recruit and committed to play college football at Oklahoma over offers from Miami, Missouri, Illinois, Iowa State, and Minnesota.

== College career ==
Hayes redshirted his true freshman season at Oklahoma. He played in three games as a reserve offensive lineman during his redshirt freshman season. Hayes became the Sooners' starting left guard going into his redshirt sophomore season and started all 13 of Oklahoma's games. He moved to right guard and started 11 games during the Sooners' COVID-19-shortened 2020 season. After considering entering the 2021 NFL draft, Hayes decided to return to Oklahoma for his redshirt senior season. He moved back to left guard and started all 13 of Oklahoma's games. After the end of the season, Hayes declared that he would be entering the 2022 NFL draft.

== Professional career ==
Pre-draft measurables
Height	Weight	Arm length	Hand span	Wingspan	40-yard dash	10-yard split	20-yard split	20-yard shuttle	Three-cone drill	Vertical jump	Broad jump
6 ft 4 7/8 in (1.95 m)	318 lb (144 kg)	34 7/8 in (0.89 m)	8 7/8 in (0.23 m)	6 ft 11 1/2 in (2.12 m)	5.30 s	1.83 s	3.06 s	4.78 s	7.94 s	24.5 in (0.62 m)	8 ft 6 in (2.59 m)
All values from NFL Combine/Pro Day

=== Arizona Cardinals ===
Hayes was selected by the Arizona Cardinals in the seventh round (257th overall) of the 2022 NFL draft. He was placed on injured reserve on August 30, 2022. On August 30, 2023, Hayes was waived by the Cardinals and re-signed to the practice squad. He signed a reserve/future contract on January 8, 2024. Hayes was waived on August 27, 2024, and re-signed to the practice squad. He was released on September 17, 2024.

=== Washington Commanders ===
Hayes signed with the Washington Commanders' practice squad on October 1, 2024. He was released by the Commanders on November 26.

=== Green Bay Packers ===
On November 30, 2024, the Green Bay Packers signed Hayes to the practice squad. He signed a reserve/future contract with Green Bay on January 13, 2025. On May 12, Hayes was released by the Packers.

=== New York Jets ===
On June 12, 2025, Hayes signed with the New York Jets. He was waived on August 27, and re-signed to the practice squad. He was promoted to the active roster on December 27.

On August 30, 2026, Hayes was waived by the Jets as a part of final roster cuts; he was re-signed to the team's practice squad the following day. On September 3, Hayes was released by the Jets following the signing of Brant Banks.
