= JT Woods =

American football player (born 2000)

Profile
- Positions: Cornerback, safety

Personal information
- Born: June 10, 2000 (age 26); San Antonio, Texas, U.S.
- Listed height: 6 ft 2 in (1.88 m)
- Listed weight: 195 lb (88 kg)

Career information
- High school: Steele (Cibolo, Texas)
- College: Baylor (2018–2021)
- NFL draft: 2022: 3rd round, 79th overall pick

Career history
- Los Angeles Chargers (2022–2023); Philadelphia Eagles (2024)*; Chicago Bears (2024)*; Seattle Seahawks (2025)*; Las Vegas Raiders (2025)*; New York Jets (2025)*; New York Giants (2026)*
- * Offseason or practice squad member only

Career NFL statistics
- Total tackles: 8
- Stats at Pro Football Reference

Jalen Terrell Woods (born June 10, 2000) is an American professional football cornerback. He played college football for the Baylor Bears and was selected in the third round of the 2022 NFL draft by the Los Angeles Chargers.

== Professional career ==
Pre-draft measurables
Height	Weight	Arm length	Hand span	Wingspan	40-yard dash	10-yard split	20-yard split	20-yard shuttle	Three-cone drill	Vertical jump	Broad jump	Bench press
6 ft 2 1/8 in (1.88 m)	195 lb (88 kg)	32 3/8 in (0.82 m)	8 1/2 in (0.22 m)	6 ft 5 3/8 in (1.97 m)	4.36 s	1.54 s	2.56 s	4.19 s	6.94 s	39.5 in (1.00 m)	10 ft 8 in (3.25 m)	14 reps
All values from NFL Combine/Pro Day

=== Los Angeles Chargers ===
Woods was drafted by the Los Angeles Chargers in the third round, 79th overall, of the 2022 NFL draft.

On September 30, 2023, Woods was placed on the reserve/non-football illness list. He was activated on December 5.

On August 28, 2024, Woods was waived by the Chargers.

=== Philadelphia Eagles ===
On August 30, 2024, Woods was signed to the Philadelphia Eagles' practice squad. He was released on October 22.

=== Chicago Bears ===
On November 7, 2024, Woods signed with the Chicago Bears' practice squad.

=== Seattle Seahawks ===
On January 17, 2025, Woods signed a reserve/future contract with the Seattle Seahawks. He was waived by the Seahawks on July 2.

=== Las Vegas Raiders ===
On July 22, 2025, Woods signed with the Las Vegas Raiders. He was waived on August 26 as part of final roster cuts and re-signed to the practice squad the next day. On October 21, Woods was released.

=== New York Jets ===
On October 22, 2025, Woods was signed to the New York Jets' practice squad. He was released on November 11.

=== New York Giants ===
On August 10, 2026, Woods signed with the New York Giants. He was waived by the Giants as a part of final roster cuts on August 30. The following day, Woods was re-signed to the team's practice squad, but released shortly after.
