= Russ Yeast =

American football player (born 1999)

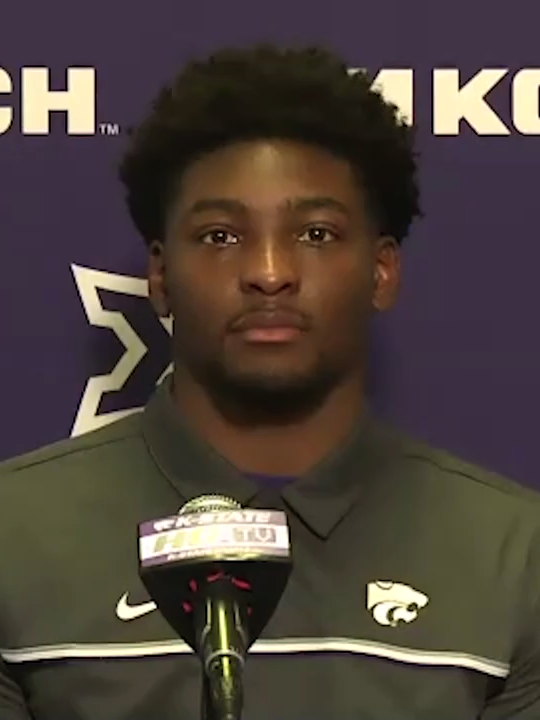
- Yeast in 2021

No. 22 – Cincinnati Bengals
- Position: Safety
- Roster status: Active

Personal information
- Born: May 8, 1999 (age 27); Danville, Kentucky, U.S.
- Listed height: 5 ft 10 in (1.78 m)
- Listed weight: 195 lb (88 kg)

Career information
- High school: Center Grove (Greenwood, Indiana)
- College: Louisville (2017–2020); Kansas State (2021)
- NFL draft: 2022: 7th round, 253rd overall pick

Career history
- Los Angeles Rams (2022–2024); Carolina Panthers (2024); Arizona Cardinals (2024)*; Houston Texans (2024)*; Cincinnati Bengals (2025–present)
- * Offseason or practice squad member only

Awards and highlights
- First-team All-Big 12 (2021)

Career NFL statistics as of 2025
- Total tackles: 82
- Pass deflections: 5
- Stats at Pro Football Reference

Craig Russell Yeast II (born May 8, 1999) is a football safety for the Cincinnati Bengals of the National Football League (NFL). He has also played for the Los Angeles Rams and Carolina Panthers. He played college football for the Louisville Cardinals and Kansas State Wildcats.

== College career ==
Yeast played college football at Louisville from 2017 to 2020 before transferring to Kansas State for the 2021 season.

== Professional career ==
Pre-draft measurables
Height	Weight	Arm length	Hand span	Wingspan	40-yard dash	10-yard split	20-yard split	20-yard shuttle	Three-cone drill	Vertical jump	Broad jump	Bench press
5 ft 10 in (1.78 m)	192 lb (87 kg)	31 3/4 in (0.81 m)	9 in (0.23 m)	6 ft 7 1/8 in (2.01 m)	4.58 s	1.59 s	2.67 s	4.35 s	6.82 s	37.5 in (0.95 m)	9 ft 11 in (3.02 m)	18 reps
All values from Pro Day

=== Los Angeles Rams ===
Yeast was selected by the Los Angeles Rams in the seventh round, 253rd overall, in the 2022 NFL draft. He played largely on special teams during his rookie season with the Rams. He earned an increased role on defense in the final month, and he made his first NFL start in the Rams' season finale against the Seattle Seahawks on January 8, 2023. Yeast left that game early with a pulmonary contusion that kept him in a hospital overnight in Seattle.

After the offseason departures of Rams safeties Taylor Rapp and Nick Scott, Yeast became the Rams' starting free safety during training camp in 2023. He lost his starting job by midseason, being replaced by veteran John Johnson.

After fighting for a roster spot in 2024, he made the final roster as a backup, but was waived on September 14, 2024.

=== Carolina Panthers ===
On September 18, 2024, Yeast was signed to the Carolina Panthers' practice squad. He was promoted to the active roster a week later. Yeast was released on October 8 and re-signed to the practice squad two days later. He was promoted back to the active roster on October 26, but released two days later.

=== Arizona Cardinals ===
On November 6, 2024, Yeast was signed to the Arizona Cardinals' practice squad. He was released by the Cardinals on November 11.

=== Houston Texans ===
On November 27, 2024, Yeast was signed to the Houston Texans' practice squad. He signed a reserve/future contract with Houston on January 21, 2025. On August 26, Yeast was waived by the Texans as part of final roster cuts.

=== Cincinnati Bengals ===
On August 28, 2025, Yeast was signed to the Cincinnati Bengals' practice squad. He signed a reserve/future contract with Cincinnati on January 5, 2026.

On August 30, 2026, Yeast was released by the Bengals as a part of final roster cuts; he was re-signed to the team's practice squad the next day. On October 20, 2026, Yeast was signed to the Bengals' active roster.

== Personal life ==
Yeast's father, Craig, was a star receiver at the University of Kentucky before playing professionally in the NFL and the Canadian Football League. Yeast's mother, Tori Tillman Yeast, played basketball at Kentucky. His sister, Kiyah, is a sprinter on the Louisville track team.
