= Ochaun Mathis =

American football player (born 1999)

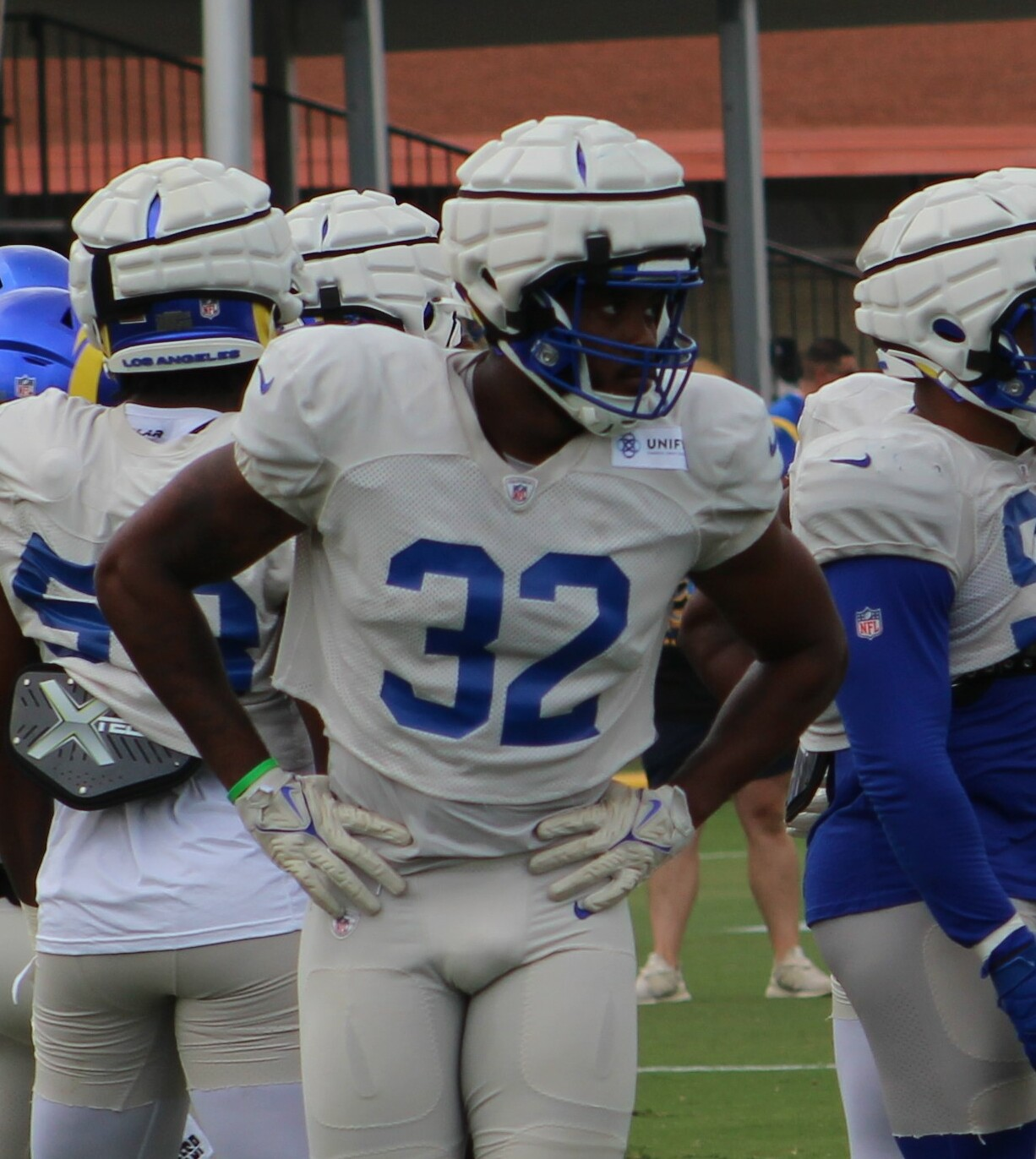
- Mathis with the Los Angeles Rams in 2023

Profile
- Position: Defensive end

Personal information
- Born: January 8, 1999 (age 27); Manor, Texas, U.S.
- Listed height: 6 ft 5 in (1.96 m)
- Listed weight: 260 lb (118 kg)

Career information
- High school: Manor
- College: TCU (2018–2021); Nebraska (2022)
- NFL draft: 2023: 6th round, 189th overall pick

Career history
- Los Angeles Rams (2023); New England Patriots (2024); Philadelphia Eagles (2024); Tennessee Titans (2025)*; Cleveland Browns (2025)*; New York Jets (2025)*
- * Offseason or practice squad member only

Awards and highlights
- Super Bowl champion (LIX); 2× Second-team All-Big 12 (2020, 2021)

Career NFL statistics as of 2025
- Total tackles: 5
- Forced fumbles: 1
- Stats at Pro Football Reference

Ochaun Mathis (born January 8, 1999) is an American professional football defensive end. He played college football for the TCU Horned Frogs and Nebraska Cornhuskers.

== Early life ==
Mathis grew up in Manor, Texas and attended Manor High School. He was rated a three-star recruit and committed to play college football at Texas Christian University (TCU) over offers from Oklahoma, Texas, and Texas Tech.

== College career ==
=== TCU ===
Mathis began his college career playing for the TCU Horned Frogs. He played in four games as a true freshman before redshirting the season. He had 40 tackles with nine tackles for loss and 2.5 sacks in his redshirt freshman season. Mathis was named second team All-Big 12 Conference after making 46 tackles with 14 tackles for loss and a team-high nine sacks in 2020. He repeated as a second team All-Big 12 selection in 2021 after recording 45 tackles with seven tackles for loss and four sacks. Following the end of the season Mathis entered the NCAA transfer portal.

=== Nebraska ===
Mathis ultimately transferred to Nebraska.

== Professional career ==
Pre-draft measurables
Height	Weight	Arm length	Hand span	40-yard dash	10-yard split	20-yard split	20-yard shuttle	Three-cone drill	Vertical jump	Broad jump	Bench press
6 ft 4 3/4 in (1.95 m)	250 lb (113 kg)	35 1/4 in (0.90 m)	10 3/4 in (0.27 m)	4.73 s	1.62 s	2.72 s	4.38 s	7.19 s	35.0 in (0.89 m)	10 ft 3 in (3.12 m)	21 reps

=== Los Angeles Rams ===
Mathis was selected by the Los Angeles Rams in the sixth round, 189th overall, of the 2023 NFL draft. The pick was previously traded to the Rams by the Tennessee Titans in exchange for Robert Woods. He was placed on injured reserve on September 1, 2023. He was activated on October 7.

On August 25, 2024, Mathis was waived by the Rams.

=== New England Patriots ===
On August 30, 2024, Mathis was signed to the New England Patriots practice squad. On October 29, he was promoted to the active roster. On November 19, Mathis was released.

=== Philadelphia Eagles ===
On November 22, 2024, Mathis was signed to the Philadelphia Eagles practice squad. He won a Super Bowl championship when the Eagles defeated the Kansas City Chiefs 40–22 in Super Bowl LIX. He signed a reserve/future contract with Philadelphia on February 14, 2025.

On August 26, 2025, Mathis was waived by the Eagles as part of final roster cuts.

=== Tennessee Titans ===
On October 21, 2025, Mathis signed with the Tennessee Titans' practice squad. He was released by the Titans on October 28.

=== Cleveland Browns ===
On November 11, 2025, Mathis signed with the Cleveland Browns' practice squad. He was released on December 9.

=== New York Jets ===
On December 16, 2025, Mathis was signed to the New York Jets' practice squad. He signed a reserve/future contract with New York on January 5, 2026. On May 11, Mathis was waived by the Jets.
