= Will McDonald IV =

American football player (born 1999)

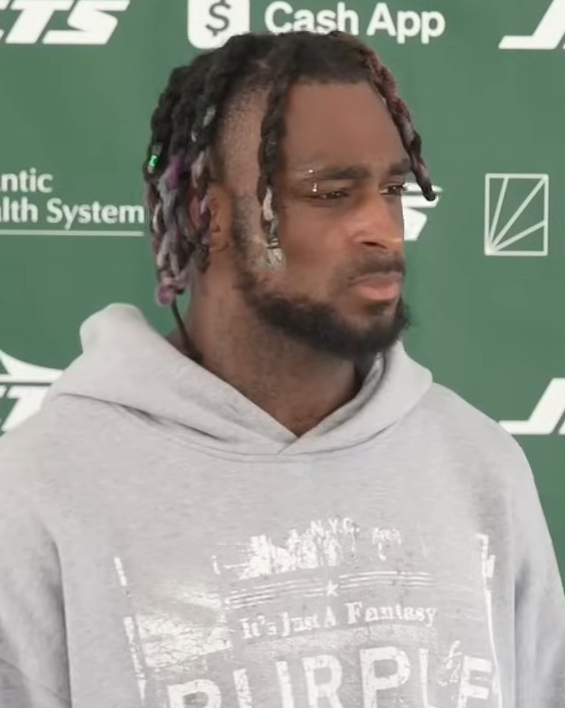
- McDonald with the New York Jets in 2025

No. 9 – New York Jets
- Position: Defensive end
- Roster status: Active

Personal information
- Born: June 4, 1999 (age 27); Pewaukee, Wisconsin, U.S.
- Listed height: 6 ft 4 in (1.93 m)
- Listed weight: 245 lb (111 kg)

Career information
- High school: Waukesha North (Waukesha, Wisconsin)
- College: Iowa State (2018–2022)
- NFL draft: 2023: 1st round, 15th overall pick

Career history
- New York Jets (2023–present)

Awards and highlights
- Big 12 co-Defensive Lineman of the Year (2021); 3× First-team All-Big 12 (2020–2022)

Career NFL statistics as of Week 3, 2026
- Total tackles: 74
- Sacks: 22.5
- Forced fumbles: 3
- Fumble recoveries: 2
- Pass deflections: 3
- Touchdowns: 1
- Stats at Pro Football Reference

Wilbert McDonald IV (born June 4, 1999) is an American professional football defensive end for the New York Jets of the National Football League (NFL). He played college football for the Iowa State Cyclones and was selected by the Jets as the 15th pick in the first round of the 2023 NFL draft.

== Early life ==
McDonald was born on June 4, 1999, in Pewaukee, Wisconsin. He attended Casimir Pulaski High School as a freshman before transferring to Waukesha North High School in Waukesha, Wisconsin, where he lettered in basketball, and track and field in addition to football.

== College career ==
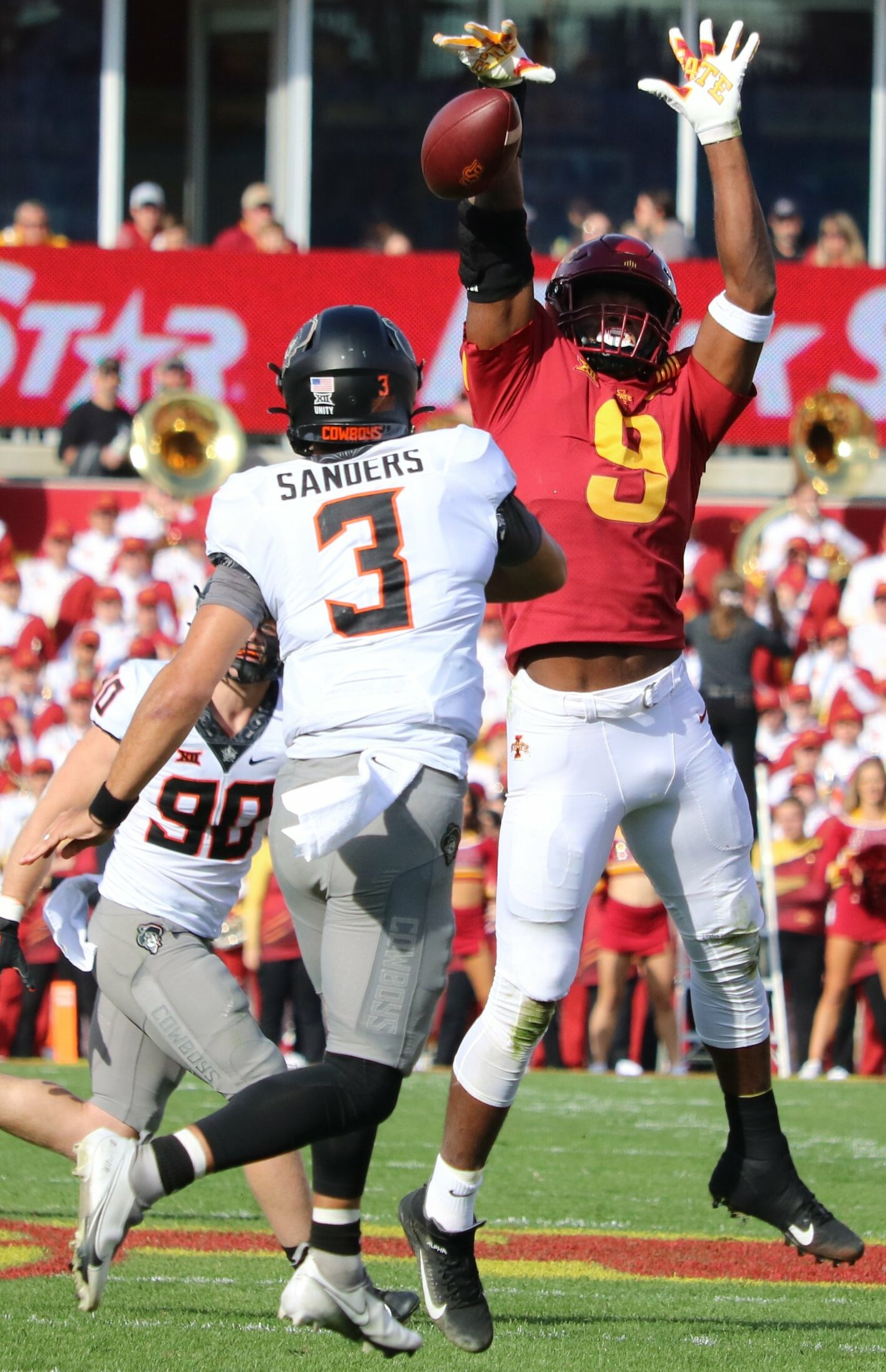
McDonald (#9) with Iowa State in 2021

McDonald had three tackles with one sack and a forced fumble in four games as a true freshman before deciding to redshirt the rest of the season. McDonald was named first team All-Big 12 Conference as a redshirt sophomore after setting a school record and tying for the national lead with 10.5 sacks. McDonald broke his previous single-season sack record and the Iowa State career sacks record during his redshirt junior season.

== Professional career ==
Pre-draft measurables
Height	Weight	Arm length	Hand span	Wingspan	40-yard dash	10-yard split	20-yard split	20-yard shuttle	Three-cone drill	Vertical jump	Broad jump
6 ft 3 5/8 in (1.92 m)	239 lb (108 kg)	34 7/8 in (0.89 m)	9 1/2 in (0.24 m)	6 ft 10 1/4 in (2.09 m)	4.70 s	1.63 s	2.65 s	4.22 s	6.85 s	36.0 in (0.91 m)	11 ft 0 in (3.35 m)
All values from NFL Combine/Pro Day

McDonald was selected by the New York Jets in the first round as the 15th overall pick in the 2023 NFL draft. The Jets, who had the 13th overall pick, traded down two spots with the Green Bay Packers as part of the Aaron Rodgers trade. As a rookie, he had three sacks, one forced fumble, and one fumble recovery.

=== 2024 season ===
In his second season, McDonald emerged as a standout defensive end for the New York Jets. McDonald had 28 total tackles including 10.5 sacks (t-12th in NFL), 3 pass deflections, and 2 forced fumbles, adding 24 quarterback hits (t-7th in NFL). In week two against the Tennessee Titans, he had 3 sacks and a forced fumble in the Jets 24-17 win.

=== 2025 season ===
In 2025, McDonald led the Jets with eight sacks and 10 tackles for loss through 15 games. On December 26, 2025, McDonald was placed on season-ending injured reserve due to a knee injury suffered in Week 16 against the New Orleans Saints.

=== 2026 season ===
On April 29, 2026, the Jets picked up the fifth-year option on McDonald's contract.

== NFL career statistics ==
Legend
**Bold**	Career high

=== Regular season ===
Year	Team	Games		Tackles					Interceptions						Fumbles				
Year	Team	GP	GS	Cmb	Solo	Ast	Sck	TFL	Int	Yds	Avg	Lng	TD	PD	FF	Fum	FR	Yds	TD
2023	NYJ	15	0	14	9	5	3.0	4	0	0	0.0	0	0	0	1	0	**1**	0	0
2024	NYJ	**17**	**15**	28	18	10	**10.5**	**11**	0	0	0.0	0	0	**3**	**2**	0	**1**	0	0
2025	NYJ	15	14	**30**	**19**	**11**	8.0	10	0	0	0.0	0	0	0	0	0	0	0	0
Career		47	29	72	46	26	21.5	25	0	0	0.0	0	0	3	3	0	2	0	0
