= Austin McNamara =

American football player (born 2001)

No. 14 – New York Jets
- Position: Punter / Kickoff specialist
- Roster status: Active

Personal information
- Born: February 24, 2001 (age 25); San Jose, California, U.S.
- Listed height: 6 ft 4 in (1.93 m)
- Listed weight: 204 lb (93 kg)

Career information
- High school: Highland (Gilbert, Arizona)
- College: Texas Tech (2019–2023)
- NFL draft: 2024: undrafted

Career history
- Cincinnati Bengals (2024)*; New York Jets (2025–present)
- * Offseason or practice squad member only

Awards and highlights
- Big 12 Special Teams Player of the Year (2023); 3× First-team All-Big 12 (2019, 2020, 2023); Second-team All-Big 12 (2021)

Career NFL statistics as of Week 7, 2026
- Punts: 100
- Punting yards: 4,695
- Punting average: 47
- Longest punt: 72
- Inside 20: 42
- Touchbacks: 8
- Stats at Pro Football Reference

Austin McNamara (born February 24, 2001) is an American professional football punter and kickoff specialist for the New York Jets of the National Football League (NFL). He played college football for the Texas Tech Red Raiders.

== Early life ==
McNamara was born in San Jose, California, and grew up in Gilbert, Arizona. He attended Highland High School in Arizona where he played basketball and football. A placekicker and punter, he averaged 42 yards-per-punt, made 12 field goals and all 63 of his extra point attempts as a senior, being named first-team all-state. Ranked as the best punter recruit nationally, McNamara committed to play college football for the Texas Tech Red Raiders.

== College career ==
McNamara won the starting job at Texas Tech as a true freshman in 2019 and averaged 45.0 yards per punt, which was then fourth all-time in school history, second in the National Collegiate Athletic Association (NCAA) that year among freshmen, and second in the Big 12 Conference. He was selected a freshman All-American and a first-team All-Big 12 player.

The following year, McNamara played nine games and punted 41 times while averaging 46.3 yards per punt, then second all-time in Texas Tech history and fifth in the FBS; he was named first-team All-Big 12 again and second-team All-Texas by Dave Campbell's Texas Football. In a game against West Virginia that season, he recorded a 87-yard punt which broke both the team and Big 12 records.

In 2021, McNamara set both the Texas Tech and Big 12 all-time record with a 48.2 yard punting average while playing all 13 games, additionally setting an NCAA single-game record during the year for most 50-yard punts in a game. He was a second-team all-conference selection and was named first-team All-Texas by Dave Campbell's Texas Football, also being named the best special teams player in the state by the publication.

McNamara totaled 50 punts and averaged 44.3 yards as a senior in 2022, being named third-team All-Big 12 by Phil Steele and Pro Football Focus. He returned for a final season in 2023, having received an extra year of eligibility due to the COVID-19 pandemic. He averaged 46.3 yards per punt in his last year, being named the Big 12 Special Teams Player of the Year, the first Texas Tech player to receive the honor, as well as first-team All-Big 12. He was one of two punters invited to play at the 2024 Senior Bowl, and the second Texas Tech punter all-time.

== Professional career ==
Pre-draft measurables
Height	Weight	Arm length	Hand span	Wingspan
6 ft 4 1/2 in (1.94 m)	204 lb (93 kg)	33 1/2 in (0.85 m)	10 1/2 in (0.27 m)	6 ft 9 in (2.06 m)
All values from Pro Day

=== Cincinnati Bengals ===
After going unselected in the 2024 NFL draft, McNamara was signed by the Cincinnati Bengals as an undrafted free agent. He was waived on August 7.

=== New York Jets ===
On March 14, 2025, McNamara signed with the New York Jets. He threw for three yards on December 28, to get a first down against the New England Patriots.

== NFL career statistics ==
=== Regular season ===
Year	Team	GP	Punting						
Year	Team	GP	Punts	Yds	Lng	Avg	Blk	Ins20	RetY
2025	NYJ	17	71	3,317	72	46.7	0	32	133
2026	NYJ	6	27	1,268	62	47.0	0	9	127
Career		23	98	4,585	72	47.0	0	41	260
