= Trestan Ebner =

American football player (born 1999)

Profile
- Positions: Running back, Return specialist

Personal information
- Born: January 2, 1999 (age 27); Henderson, Texas, U.S.
- Listed height: 5 ft 11 in (1.80 m)
- Listed weight: 206 lb (93 kg)

Career information
- High school: Henderson
- College: Baylor (2017–2021)
- NFL draft: 2022: 6th round, 203rd overall pick

Career history
- Chicago Bears (2022)

Awards and highlights
- 2× Big 12 Special Teams Player of the Year (2020, 2021); 2× First-team All-Big 12 (2020, 2021)

Career NFL statistics as of 2023
- Rushing yards: 54
- Rushing average: 2.3
- Receptions: 2
- Receiving yards: 8
- Return yards: 226
- Stats at Pro Football Reference

Trestan Ebner (born January 2, 1999) is an American professional football running back and return specialist. He played college football for the Baylor Bears.

== Early life ==
Ebner grew up in Henderson, Texas and attended Henderson High School. As a senior he had 57 receptions for 1,074 yards and 16 touchdowns.

== College career ==
Ebner played in 11 games during his freshman season and rushed for 121 yards and two touchdowns and caught 20 passes for 267 yards and three touchdowns. As a sophomore, he gained 413 yards and scored one touchdown on 69 carries and had 29 receptions for 348 yards and one touchdown. Ebner rushed for 250 yards and three touchdowns as a junior. Ebner assumed Baylor's kickoff return duties as a senior and was named the Big 12 Conference Special Teams Player of the Year after returning 20 kicks for 612 yards and two touchdowns while also rushing for 107 yards and one touchdown and catching 26 passes for 299 yards and three touchdowns. He decided to utilize the extra year of eligibility granted to college athletes who played in the 2020 season due to the coronavirus pandemic and return to Baylor for a fifth season. Ebner repeated as the Big 12 Special Teams Player of the Year as in his fifth season.

== Professional career ==
Pre-draft measurables
| Height | Weight | Arm length | Hand span | Wingspan | 40-yard dash | 10-yard split | 20-yard split | 20-yard shuttle | Three-cone drill | Vertical jump | Broad jump | Bench press |
|---|---|---|---|---|---|---|---|---|---|---|---|---|
| 5 ft 10 3/4 in (1.80 m) | 206 lb (93 kg) | 29 3/4 in (0.76 m) | 8 1/2 in (0.22 m) | 6 ft 0 1/2 in (1.84 m) | 4.43 s | 1.53 s | 2.59 s | 4.53 s | 7.16 s | 30.0 in (0.76 m) | 9 ft 7 in (2.92 m) | 13 reps |
All values from NFL Combine/Pro Day

Ebner was selected by the Chicago Bears with the 203rd pick in the sixth round of the 2022 NFL draft. As a rookie, he mainly played on special teams. He appeared in all 17 games and recorded 24 carries for 54 rushing yards and two receptions for eight yards.

On August 29, 2023, Ebner was waived/injured by the Bears.
