= Dawson Deaton =

American football player (born 1999)

Profile
- Position: Center

Personal information
- Born: May 6, 1999 (age 27); Frisco, Texas, U.S.
- Listed height: 6 ft 5 in (1.96 m)
- Listed weight: 306 lb (139 kg)

Career information
- High school: Frisco (TX)
- College: Texas Tech (2017–2021)
- NFL draft: 2022: 7th round, 246th overall pick

Career history
- Cleveland Browns (2022–2023)

Awards and highlights
- 2× Second-team All-Big 12 (2020, 2021)
- Stats at Pro Football Reference

Dawson Deaton (born May 6, 1999) is an American professional football center. He played college football for the Texas Tech Red Raiders and was selected by the Cleveland Browns in the seventh round of the 2022 NFL draft.

== College career ==
Deaton was ranked as a three–star recruit by 247Sports.com coming out of high school. He committed to Texas Tech on February 13, 2016, over offers from Houston, Iowa State, and Utah.

== Professional career ==
Pre-draft measurables
Height	Weight	Arm length	Hand span	Wingspan	40-yard dash	10-yard split	20-yard split	20-yard shuttle	Three-cone drill	Vertical jump	Broad jump	Bench press
6 ft 5 1/2 in (1.97 m)	306 lb (139 kg)	32 7/8 in (0.84 m)	9 5/8 in (0.24 m)	6 ft 7 1/2 in (2.02 m)	5.12 s	1.75 s	2.95 s	4.49 s	7.52 s	29.0 in (0.74 m)	9 ft 0 in (2.74 m)	24 reps
All values from NFL Combine

Deaton was selected by the Cleveland Browns with the 246th pick in the seventh round of the 2022 NFL draft. He was placed on injured reserve on August 16, 2022, one day after tearing his anterior cruciate ligament during practice. Deaton was waived on July 6, 2023, with an injury designation. He was released on May 9, 2024, with a failed physical.
