= Charlie Kolar =

American football player (born 1999)

No. 88 – Los Angeles Chargers
- Position: Tight end
- Roster status: Active

Personal information
- Born: February 10, 1999 (age 27); Norman, Oklahoma, U.S.
- Listed height: 6 ft 6 in (1.98 m)
- Listed weight: 250 lb (113 kg)

Career information
- High school: Norman North
- College: Iowa State (2017–2021)
- NFL draft: 2022: 4th round, 128th overall pick

Career history
- Baltimore Ravens (2022–2025); Los Angeles Chargers (2026–present)

Awards and highlights
- William V. Campbell Trophy (2021); 3× First-team All-Big 12 (2019–2021); Second-team All-Big 12 (2018)

Career NFL statistics as of 2026
- Receptions: 36
- Receiving yards: 467
- Receiving touchdowns: 4
- Stats at Pro Football Reference

Charlie Kolar (born February 10, 1999) is an American professional football tight end for the Los Angeles Chargers of the National Football League (NFL). He played college football for the Iowa State Cyclones.

== Early life ==
Kolar grew up in Norman, Oklahoma and attended Norman North High School in the city, where he played football and basketball. As a junior he caught 52 passes for 920 yards and 13 touchdowns. He was named first-team All-State as a senior after recording 66 receptions for 1,240 yards and 12 touchdowns. He was a basketball teammate of NBA All-Star Trae Young at Norman North. Kolar committed to play college football at Iowa State University in Ames going into his senior year over offers from Air Force Academy, Army (U.S. Military Academy) and Stephen F. Austin University in Nacogdoches, Texas. He chose Iowa State despite a late recruiting push from Oklahoma State University in Stillwater.

== College career ==
Kolar redshirted for his true freshman season. As a redshirt freshman, he played in all 13 of Iowa State's games and finished the season with 11 receptions for 137 yards and three touchdowns and was named second-team All-Big 12 Conference by the league's coaches. Kolar caught 51 passes for 697 yards and seven touchdowns as a redshirt sophomore and was named first-team All-Big 12. Following the end of the season he considered entering the 2020 NFL draft, but opted to return for his redshirt junior season. Kolar was named first-team All-Big 12 for a second straight season after finishing his redshirt junior year with 44 receptions for 591 yards and a team-high seven touchdown receptions. Kolar graduated from Iowa State in the fall of 2020 with a 3.99 cumulative GPA in mechanical engineering, and in 2021, he was awarded with the William V. Campbell Trophy, known as the "academic Heisman".

== Professional career ==
Pre-draft measurables
Height	Weight	Arm length	Hand span	Wingspan	40-yard dash	10-yard split	20-yard split	20-yard shuttle	Three-cone drill	Vertical jump	Broad jump	Bench press
6 ft 6 1/2 in (1.99 m)	252 lb (114 kg)	34 1/2 in (0.88 m)	10 in (0.25 m)	6 ft 9 1/8 in (2.06 m)	4.62 s	1.66 s	2.72 s	4.30 s	7.00 s	35.5 in (0.90 m)	10 ft 0 in (3.05 m)	13 reps
All values from NFL Combine/Pro Day

=== Baltimore Ravens ===
==== 2022 season ====
Kolar was selected by the Baltimore Ravens in the fourth round, 128th overall, of the 2022 NFL draft. He was placed on injured reserve on August 31, 2022. He was activated on November 8.

Kolar made his NFL debut in Week 17 against the Pittsburgh Steelers, but played in only two snaps. In Week 18 against the Cincinnati Bengals, he recorded his first career catch as part of a day in which he caught four passes for 49 yards from Anthony Brown in a 16-27 loss.

==== 2023 season ====
Kolar was the third tight end on the depth chart behind Isaiah Likely and Mark Andrews. He mainly played on special teams and did not see heavy usage on offense. Andrews suffered a severe ankle injury in the Ravens' Week 11 34-20 win over the Cincinnati Bengals and missed the rest of the regular season. As a result, Kolar had increased playing time, recording three starts in the last six games. In Week 17 against the Miami Dolphins. He caught his first career touchdown on a 19-yard reception from Tyler Huntley in the fourth quarter of a 56-19 blowout win. He finished the regular season with seven receptions for 87 yards and a touchdown.

==== 2024 season ====
In a Week 12 victory over the Los Angeles Chargers, Kolar broke an arm and was ruled out for at least four weeks. He was activated from injured reserve on January 3, 2025, prior to the team's season finale against the Cleveland Browns.

==== 2025 season ====
In Weeks 8 and 9 Kolar scored touchdowns in back-to-back weeks against the Chicago Bears and Miami Dolphins. He ended the season with 10 receptions for 142 yards and two touchdowns.

=== Los Angeles Chargers ===
On March 10, 2026, Kolar signed a three-year, $24.3 million contract with the Los Angeles Chargers. On September 21, Kolar was placed on injured reserve due to a forearm injury suffered in the team's Week 2 loss to the Las Vegas Raiders.

== NFL career statistics ==
Legend
**Bold**	Career high

=== Regular season ===
Year	Team	Games		Receiving					Rushing				
Year	Team	GP	GS	Rec	Yds	Avg	Lng	TD	Att	Yds	Avg	Lng	TD
2022	BAL	2	0	4	49	12.3	15	0	0	0	0.0	0	0
2023	BAL	15	3	7	87	12.4	19	1	0	0	0.0	0	0
2024	BAL	13	3	9	131	**14.6**	**55**	1	**1**	**2**	**2.0**	**2**	0
2025	BAL	17	7	**10**	**142**	14.2	23	**2**	0	0	0.0	0	0
2026	LAC	3	3	6	58	9.7	19	0	0	0	0.0	1	0
Career		50	16	36	467	13.0	55	4	1	2	2.0	3	0

=== Postseason ===
Year	Team	Games		Receiving				
Year	Team	GP	GS	Rec	Yds	Avg	Lng	TD
2023	BAL	2	0	**1**	**4**	**4.0**	**4**	0
2024	BAL	2	0	0	0	0.0	0	0
Career		4	0	1	4	4.0	4	0

== Personal life ==
Kolar's older brother, John, played quarterback for Oklahoma State and as a graduate transferred to Iowa State for the 2019 season. His younger sister Katie plays volleyball for California State University, Northridge .
