= 2021 West Virginia Mountaineers football team =

American college football season

2021 West Virginia Mountaineers football

Guaranteed Rate Bowl, L 6–18 vs. Minnesota
- Conference: Big 12 Conference
- Record: 6–7 (4–5 Big 12)
- Head coach: Neal Brown (3rd season)
- Offensive coordinator: Gerad Parker (2nd season)
- Co-offensive coordinator: Chad Scott (3rd season)
- Offensive scheme: Multiple
- Defensive coordinator: Jordan Lesley (2nd season)
- Co-defensive coordinator: ShaDon Brown (1st season)
- Base defense: Multiple
- Home stadium: Milan Puskar Stadium

2021 Big 12 Conference football standings
	Conf.			Overall
Team	W		L	W		L
No. 7 Oklahoma State y	8	–	1	12	–	2
No. 5 Baylor y$	7	–	2	12	–	2
No. 10 Oklahoma	7	–	2	11	–	2
Iowa State	5	–	4	7	–	6
Kansas State	4	–	5	8	–	5
West Virginia	4	–	5	6	–	7
Texas	3	–	6	5	–	7
TCU	3	–	6	5	–	7
Texas Tech	3	–	6	7	–	6
Kansas	1	–	8	2	–	10
Championship: Baylor 21, Oklahoma State 16
$ – Conference champion; y – Championship game participant; Rankings from AP Poll

The 2021 West Virginia Mountaineers football team represented West Virginia University during the current 2021 NCAA Division I FBS football season. The Mountaineers played their home games at the Milan Puskar Stadium in Morgantown, West Virginia, and competed in the Big 12 Conference. The team was led by third-year head coach Neal Brown.

== Schedule ==
The 2021 schedule consists of 6 home and 6 away games in the regular season.

Date	Time	Opponent	Site	TV	Result	Attendance
September 4	3:30 p.m.	at Maryland*	Maryland Stadium; College Park, MD (rivalry)	ESPN	L 24–30	43,811
September 11	5:00 p.m.	LIU*	Milan Puskar Stadium; Morgantown, WV	ESPN+	W 66–0	50,911
September 18	12:00 p.m.	No. 15 Virginia Tech*	Milan Puskar Stadium; Morgantown, WV (rivalry)	FS1	W 27–21	60,222
September 25	7:30 p.m.	at No. 4 Oklahoma	Gaylord Family Oklahoma Memorial Stadium; Norman, OK	ABC	L 13–16	84,353
October 2	3:30 p.m.	Texas Tech^{†}	Milan Puskar Stadium; Morgantown, WV	ESPN2	L 20–23	54,090
October 9	12:00 p.m.	at Baylor	McLane Stadium; Waco, TX	FS1	L 20–45	43,569
October 23	7:30 p.m.	at TCU	Amon G. Carter Stadium; Fort Worth, TX	ESPNU	W 29–17	37,288
October 30	2:00 p.m.	No. 22 Iowa State	Milan Puskar Stadium; Morgantown, WV	ESPN+	W 38–31	45,613
November 6	3:30 p.m.	No. 11 Oklahoma State	Milan Puskar Stadium; Morgantown, WV	ESPN	L 3–24	50,109
November 13	12:00 p.m.	at Kansas State	Bill Snyder Family Football Stadium; Manhattan, KS	FS1	L 17–34	43,932
November 20	12:00 p.m.	Texas	Milan Puskar Stadium; Morgantown, WV	ESPN2	W 31–23	48,755
November 27	7:00 p.m.	at Kansas	David Booth Kansas Memorial Stadium; Lawrence, KS	FS1	W 34–28	23,117
December 28	10:15 p.m.	vs. Minnesota*	Chase Field; Phoenix, AZ (Guaranteed Rate Bowl)	ESPN	L 6–18	21,220
*Non-conference game; ^{†}Homecoming; Rankings from AP Poll and CFP Rankings after November 2 prior to game; All times are in Eastern time

Schedule source:

== Game summaries ==
=== At Maryland ===
West Virginia Mountaineers (0–0) vs. Maryland Terrapins (0–0)

Quarter	1	2	3	4	Total
West Virginia	14	7	0	3	24
Maryland	17	3	0	10	30

at Maryland Stadium • College Park, MD

- Date: Saturday, September 4, 2021
- Game time: 3:30 p.m. EDT
- Game weather: sunny • Temperature: 79°F
- Game attendance: 43,811
- Referee: Brandon Cruse
- TV announcers (ESPN): Anish Shroff, Mike Golic Jr., Taylor McGregor

Game information

First Quarter

- (11:46) UMD – Joseph Petrino 45 yard field goal (Drive: 9 plays, 47 yards, 3:14; UMD 3–0)
- (8:52) WVU – Leddie Brown 20 yard pass from Jarret Doege, Casey Legg kick (Drive: 7 plays, 78 yards, 2:59; WVU 7–3)
- (7:57) UMD – Dontay Demus Jr. 66 yard pass from Taulia Tagovailoa, Joseph Petrino kick (Drive: 2 plays, 80 yards, 0:50; UMD 10–7)
- (0:53) UMD – Chig Okonkwo 18 yard pass from Taulia Tagovailoa, Joseph Petrino kick (Drive: 8 plays, 70 yards, 3:03; UMD 17–7)
- (0:35) WVU – Leddie Brown 2 yard run, Casey Legg kick (Drive: 1 play, 2 yards, 0:04; UMD 17–14)

Second Quarter

- (11:30) WVU – Leddie Brown 9 yard run, Casey Legg kick (Drive: 6 plays, 74 yards, 3:00; WVU 21–17)
- (0:27) UMD – Joseph Petrino 21 yard field goal (Drive: 7 plays, 66 yards, 1:31; WVU 21–20)

Fourth Quarter

- (9:16) UMD – Joseph Petrino 26 yard field goal (Drive: 14 plays, 58 yards, 5:53; UMD 23–21)
- (6:25) UMD – Rakim Jarrett 60 yard pass from Taulia Tagovailoa, Joseph Petrino kick (Drive: 5 plays, 80 yards, 1:51; UMD 30–21)
- (2:53) WVU – Casey Legg 23 yard field goal (Drive: 14 plays, 69 yards, 3:32; UMD 30–24)

Statistics	WVU	UMD
First downs	18	22
Total yards	319	495
Rushes/yards	21/42	44/163
Passing yards	277	332
Passing: Comp–Att–Int	24–40–2	26–36–0
Time of possession	25:57	34:03

Team	Category	Player	Statistics
West Virginia	Passing	Jarret Doege	24–40, 277 yards, 1 TD, 2 INT
West Virginia	Rushing	Leddie Brown	16 carries, 69 yards, 2 TD
West Virginia	Receiving	Sam James	5 receptions, 65 yards
Maryland	Passing	Taulia Tagovailoa	26–36, 332 yards, 3 TD
Maryland	Rushing	Tayon Fleet-Davis	18 carries, 123 yards
Maryland	Receiving	Dontay Demus Jr.	6 receptions, 133 yards, 1 TD

=== LIU ===
LIU Sharks (0–1) vs. West Virginia Mountaineers (0–1)

Quarter	1	2	3	4	Total
LIU	0	0	0	0	0
West Virginia	21	17	21	7	66

at Mountaineer Field • Morgantown, WV

- Date: Saturday, September 11, 2021
- Game time: 5:00 p.m. EDT
- Game weather: sunny • Temperature: 73°F
- Game attendance: 50,911
- Referee: Scott Campbell
- TV announcers (ESPN+): Bill Spaulding, Barrett Brooks

Game information

First Quarter

- (14:49) WVU – Winston Wright Jr. 90 yard Kickoff Return, Casey Legg kick (Drive: 1 plays, 90 yards, 0:11; WVU 7–0)
- (6:16) WVU – Leddie Brown 1 yard run, Casey Legg kick (Drive: 14 plays, 80 yards, 5:09; WVU 14-0)
- (7:57) WVU – Leddie Brown 2 yard run, Casey Legg kick (Drive: 6 plays, 39 yards, 2:07; WVU 21-0)

Second Quarter

- (8:58) WVU – Garrett Greene 3 yard run, Casey Legg kick (Drive: 13 plays, 69 yards, 5:12; WVU 28–0)
- (3:07) WVU – Sam James 18 yard pass from Jarret Doege, Casey Legg kick (Drive: 11 plays, 56 yards, 3:46; WVU 35–0)
- (0:00) WVU – Casey Legg 44 yard field goal (Drive: 7 plays, 53 yards, 0:32; WVU 38-0)

Third Quarter

- (12:34) WVU – Sean Ryan 39 yard pass from Jarret Doege, Casey Legg kick (Drive: 3 plays, 49 yards, 1:18; WVU 45-0)
- (11:16) WVU – Sam James 15 yard pass from Jarret Doege, Casey Legg kick (Drive: 3 plays, 26 yards, 0:44; WVU 52-0)
- (5:59) WVU – Garrett Greene 13 yard run, Evan Staley kick (Drive: 7 plays, 54 yards, 3:05; WVU 59-0)

Fourth Quarter

- (5:25) WVU – A'Varius Sparrow 1 yard run, Evan Staley kick (Drive: 3 plays, 29 yards, 1:18; WVU 66-0)

Statistics	LIU	WVU
First downs	9	29
Total yards	95	542
Rushes/yards	35/31	55/198
Passing yards	60	344
Passing: Comp–Att–Int	11–21–0	20–32–0
Time of possession	24:53	35:07

Team	Category	Player	Statistics
Long Island	Passing	Camden Orth	11–20, 60 yards
Long Island	Rushing	Jonathan DeBique	8 carries, 23 yards
Long Island	Receiving	Steven Chambers	2 receptions, 18 yards
West Virginia	Passing	Jarret Doege	14–22, 259 yards, 3 TD
West Virginia	Rushing	Garrett Greene	14 carries, 98 yards, 2 TD
West Virginia	Receiving	Sean Ryan	3 receptions, 77 yards, 1 TD

=== Virginia Tech ===
No. 15 Virginia Tech Hokies (2–0) vs West Virginia Mountaineers (1–1)

Quarter	1	2	3	4	Total
No. 15 Virginia Tech	7	0	7	7	21
West Virginia	14	10	3	0	27

at Mountaineer Field • Morgantown, WV

- Date: Saturday, September 18, 2021
- Game time: 12:00 p.m. CDT
- Game weather: Sunny • Temperature: 79 °F (26 °C)
- Game attendance: 60,022
- Referee: Riley Johnson
- TV announcers (FS1): Corey Provus, Devin Gardner

Game information

First quarter

- (12:24) WVU – Leddie Brown 80 yd Rush (Casey Legg Kick) (Drive: 2 plays 80 yards, 0:18; 7–0 WVU)
- (9:11) WVU – Bryce Ford-Wheaton 29 yd Pass From Jarret Doege (Casey Legg Kick) (Drive: 3 plays 55 yards, 1:10; 14–0 WVU)
- (3:11) VT – Tayvion Robinson 23 yd Pass From Braxton Burmeister (John Parker Romo Kick) (Drive: 10 plays 75 yards, 6:00; 14–7 WVU)

Second quarter

- (7:44) WVU – Sam James 16 yd Pass From Jarret Doege (Casey Legg Kick) (Drive: 6 plays 56 yards, 1:55; 21–7 WVU)
- (1:41) WVU – Casey Legg 21 yd Field Goal (Drive: 12 plays 79 yards, 3:53; 24–7 WVU)

Third quarter

- (8:17) WVU – Casey Legg 44 yd Field Goal (Drive: 12 plays 55 yards, 6:38; 27–7 WVU)
- (0:01) VT – Raheem Blackshear 20 yd Rush (John Parker Romo Kick) (Drive: 9 plays 76 yards, 4:20; 27–14 WVU)

Fourth quarter

- (3:10) VT – Jalen Holston 29 yd Pass From Braxton Burmeister (John Parker Romo Kick) (Drive: 7 plays 47 yards, 1:38; 27–21 WVU)

Statistics	VT	WVU
First downs	19	18
Total yards	329	373
Rush yards	106	180
Passing yards	223	193
Turnovers	1	2
Time of possession	32:03	27:57

Team	Category	Player	Statistics
Virginia Tech	Passing	Braxton Burmeister	19/31, 223 yards, TD
Virginia Tech	Rushing	Raheem Blackshear	10 carries, 47 yards, TD
Virginia Tech	Receiving	Kaleb Smith	6 receptions, 58 yards
West Virginia	Passing	Jarret Doege	15/26, 193 yards, 2 TD
West Virginia	Rushing	Leddie Brown	19 carries, 161 yards, TD
West Virginia	Receiving	Isaiah Esdale	4 receptions, 46 yards

=== At Oklahoma ===
West Virginia Mountaineers (2–1) vs. No. 4 Oklahoma Sooners (3–0)

Quarter	1	2	3	4	Total
West Virginia	7	3	3	0	13
No. 4 Oklahoma	7	0	3	6	16

at Gaylord Family Oklahoma Memorial Stadium • Norman, OK

- Date: Saturday, September 25, 2021
- Game time: 6:30 p.m. CDT
- Game weather: • Sunny Temperature: 86
- Game attendance: 84,353
- Referee: David Alvarez
- TV announcers (ABC): Chris Fowler (play-by-play), Kirk Herbstreit (analyst) and Holly Rowe (sideline)

Game information

First Quarter

- (5:53) WVU - Garrett Greene 2 yard rush, Casey Legg kick (Drive: 17 plays, 75 yards, 9:07; WVU 7-0)
- (2:46) OKLA - Spencer Rattler 5 yard pass to Austin Stogner, Gabe Brkic kick (Drive: 7 plays, 67 yards, 3:00; Tied 7-7)

Second Quarter

- (0:00) WVU - Casey Legg 25 yard FG (Drive: 9 plays 41 yards, 2:16; WVU 10-7)

Third Quarter

- (11:26) OKLA - Gabe Brkic 28 yard FG (Drive: 10 plays, 64 yards, 3:29; Tied 10-10)
- (5:21) WVU - Casey Legg 21 yard FG (Drive: 11 plays, 68 yards, 5:59; WVU 13-10)

Fourth Quarter

- (8:52) OKLA - Gabe Brkic 35 yard FG (Drive: 16 plays, 62 yards, 8:11; Tied 13-13)
- (0:00) OKLA - Gabe Brkic 30 yard FG (Drive: 14 plays, 80 yards, 3:39; OU 16-13)

Statistics	WVU	OKLA
First downs	18	19
Total yards	226	313
Rushes/yards	29-47	28-57
Passing yards	179	256
Passing: Comp–Att–Int	23-34-1	26-36-1
Time of possession	33:00	27:00

Team	Category	Player	Statistics
West Virginia	Passing	Jarret Doege	20/29, 160 yards, 1 INT
West Virginia	Rushing	Leddie Brown	15 carries, 56 yards
West Virginia	Receiving	Bryce Ford-Wheaton	8 receptions, 93 yards
Oklahoma	Passing	Spencer Rattler	26/36, 256 yards, 1 TD, 1 INT
Oklahoma	Rushing	Eric Gray	12 carries, 38 yards
Oklahoma	Receiving	Michael Woods II	8 receptions, 86 yards

=== Texas Tech ===
Texas Tech Red Raiders (3–1) at West Virginia Mountaineers (2–2) – Game summary

Quarter	1	2	3	4	Total
Red Raiders	14	3	0	6	23
Mountaineers	0	0	17	3	20

at Milan Puskar Stadium, Morgantown, West Virginia

- Date: October 2
- Game time: 2:30 p.m.
- Game weather: Temperature: 75 °F (24 °C) • Weather: Sunny • Wind: SW 6 MPH
- Game attendance: 54,090
- Referee: Michael Vandervelde
- TV announcers (ESPN2): Anish Shroff (play-by-play), Mike Golic Jr. (analyst) and Lauren Sisler (sideline)
- Box score, Recap

Game information

First quarter

- TTU – SaRodrick Thompson 1-yard run (Jonathan Garibay kick), 4:51. Red Raiders 7–0. Drive: 10 plays, 58 yards, 4:27.
- TTU – SaRodrick Thompson 1-yard run (Jonathan Garibay kick), 0:08. Red Raiders 14–0. Drive: 6 plays, 34 yards, 2:49.

Second quarter

- TTU – Jonathan Garibay 33-yard field goal, 0:00. Red Raiders 17–0. Drive: 12 plays, 59 yards, 1:57.

Third quarter

- WVU – Leddie Brown 4-yard run (Casey Legg kick), 11:59. Red Raiders 17–7. Drive: 7 plays, 75 yards, 3:01.
- WVU – Casey Legg 36-yard field goal, 5:47. Red Raiders 17–10. Drive: 9 plays, 46 yards, 3:43.
- WVU – Isaiah Esdale 14-yard pass from Jarret Doege (Casey Legg kick), 1:15. Tied 17–17. Drive: 6 plays, 86 yards, 2:58.

Fourth quarter

- TTU – Jonathan Garibay 29-yard field goal, 11:46. Red Raiders 20–17. Drive: 9 plays, 62 yards, 4:29.
- WVU – Casey Legg 28-yard field goal, 4:34. Tied 20–20. Drive: 13 plays, 64 yards, 7:12.
- TTU – Jonathan Garibay 32-yard field goal, 0:18. Red Raiders 23–20. Drive: 8 plays, 70 yards, 4:16.

Top passers

- TTU – Henry Colombi – 23/34, 266 yards
- WVU – Jarret Doege – 25/33, 318 yards, TD

Top rushers

- TTU – SaRodorick Thompson – 12 rushes, 48 yards, 2 TD
- WVU – Leddie Brown – 17 rushes, 57 yards, TD

Top receivers

- TTU – Kaylon Geiger – 7 receptions, 82 yards
- WVU – Isaiah Esdale – 6 receptions, 113 yards, TD

=== At Baylor ===
West Virginia Mountaineers (2–3) vs. Baylor Bears (4–1)

Quarter	1	2	3	4	Total
West Virginia	7	3	3	7	20
Baylor	21	7	14	3	45

at McLane Stadium • Waco, TX

- Date: Saturday, October 9, 2021
- Game time: 11:00 a.m. CDT
- Game weather: sunny • Temperature: 80°F
- Game attendance: 43,569
- Referee: Kevin Hassel
- TV announcers (FS1): Cory Provus, Mark Helfrich

Game information

First Quarter

- (14:19) BU – Tyquan Thornton 75 yard pass from Gerry Bohanon, Isaiah Hankins kick (Drive: 2 plays, 75 yards, 0:41; BU 7–0)
- (12:41) WVU – Sean Ryan 12 yard pass from Jarret Doege, Casey Legg kick (Drive: 6 plays, 75 yards, 1:38; 7–7)
- (9:22) BU – Ben Sims 10 yard pass from Gerry Bohanon, Isaiah Hankins kick (Drive: 8 plays, 75 yards, 3:19; BU 14–7)
- (5:24) BU – Gerry Bohanon 1 yard run, Isaiah Hankins kick (Drive: 5 plays, 48 yards, 2:09; BU 21–7)

Second Quarter

- (9:52) BU – Tyquan Thornton 11 yard pass from Gerry Bohanon, Isaiah Hankins kick (Drive: 5 plays, 86 yards, 1:48; BU 28–7)
- (6:17) WVU – Casey Legg 29 yard field goal (Drive: 11 plays, 66 yards, 3:30; BU 28–10)

Third Quarter

- (9:17) WVU – Casey Legg 27 yard field goal (Drive: 12 plays, 78 yards, 5:43; BU 28–13)
- (8:43) BU – Ben Sims 29 yard pass from Gerry Bohanon, Isaiah Hankins kick (Drive: 3 plays, 47 yards, 0:33; BU 35–13)
- (4:37) BU – Abram Smith 31 yard run, Isaiah Hankins kick (Drive: 6 plays, 69 yards, 1:48; BU 42–13)

Fourth Quarter

- (10:12) BU – Isaiah Hankins 45 yard field goal (Drive: 9 plays, 46 yards, 3:09; BU 45–13)
- (4:18) WVU – Garrett Greene 13 yard run, Casey Legg kick (Drive: 12 plays, 85 yards, 5:48; BU 45–20)

Statistics	WVU	BU
First downs	24	21
Total yards	362	525
Rushes/yards	38/90	32/171
Passing yards	272	354
Passing: Comp–Att–Int	24–37–1	20–31–0
Time of possession	34:21	25:39

Team	Category	Player	Statistics
West Virginia	Passing	Jarret Doege	20–31, 237 yards, 1 TD, 1 INT
West Virginia	Rushing	Garrett Greene	10 carries, 55 yards, 1 TD
West Virginia	Receiving	Winston Wright Jr.	6 receptions, 86 yards
Baylor	Passing	Gerry Bohanon	18–29, 336 yards, 4 TD
Baylor	Rushing	Abram Smith	11 carries, 87 yards, 1 TD
Baylor	Receiving	Tyquan Thornton	8 receptions, 187 yards, 2 TD

=== At TCU ===
West Virginia Mountaineers (2–4) vs. TCU Horned Frogs (3–3)

Quarter	1	2	3	4	Total
West Virginia	10	10	3	6	29
TCU	7	10	0	0	17

at Amon G. Carter Stadium • Fort Worth, TX

- Date: Saturday, October 23, 2021
- Game time: 6:30 p.m. CDT
- Game weather: sunny • Temperature: 85°F • Wind: SE 16mph
- Game attendance: 37,288
- Referee: David Alvarez
- TV announcers (ESPNU): Brian Custer and Kelly Stouffer

Game information

First Quarter

- (14:46) TCU – Derius Davis 100-yard kickoff return, Griffin Kell kick (TCU 7–0)
- (10:57) WVU – Casey Legg 27-yard field goal (Drive: 9 plays, 79 yards, 3:44; TCU 7–3)
- (0:07) WVU – Leddie Brown 5-yard run, Casey Legg kick (Drive: 15 plays, 94 yards, 7:47; WVU 10–7)

Second Quarter

- (9:07) WVU – Casey Legg 38-yard field goal (Drive: 6 plays, 71 yards, 3:20; WVU 13–7)
- (5:17) TCU – Taye Barber 5-yard pass from Max Duggan, Griffin Kell kick (Drive: 9 plays, 76 yards, 3:48; TCU 14–13)
- (2:51) WVU – Leddie Brown 1-yard run, Casey Legg kick (Drive: 6 plays, 65 yards, 2:26; WVU 20–14)
- (0:14) TCU – Griffin Kell 24-yard field goal (Drive: 9 plays, 68 yards, 2:34; WVU 20–17)

Third Quarter

- (3:56) WVU – Casey Legg 48-yard field goal (Drive: 5 plays, 10 yards, 2:50; WVU 23–17)

Fourth Quarter

- (12:26) WVU – Leddie Brown 3-yard run, Mike O'Laughlin pass failed (Drive: 3 plays, 15 yards, 1:19; WVU 29–17)

Statistics	WVU	TCU
First downs	24	19
Total yards	487	393
Rushes/yards	41/229	34/149
Passing yards	258	244
Passing: Comp–Att–Int	22–29–0	16–26–2
Time of possession	35:30	24:30

Team	Category	Player	Statistics
West Virginia	Passing	Jarret Doege	21–28, 257 yards
West Virginia	Rushing	Leddie Brown	24 carries, 111 yards, 3 TD
West Virginia	Receiving	Sean Ryan	4 receptions, 81 yards
TCU	Passing	Max Duggan	16–26, 244 yards, 1 TD, 2 INT
TCU	Rushing	Zach Evans	18 carries, 62 yards
TCU	Receiving	Quentin Johnston	5 receptions, 113 yards

=== Iowa State ===
No. 22 Iowa State Cyclones (5–2) vs West Virginia Mountaineers (3–4)

Quarter	1	2	3	4	Total
Iowa State	14	3	14	0	31
West Virginia	14	3	7	14	38

at Milan Puskar Stadium • Morgantown, West Virginia

- Date: Saturday, October 30, 2021
- Game time: 1:00 p.m. CDT
- Game weather: Rain • Temperature: 47°F
- Game attendance: 48,363
- Referee: Derek Anderson
- TV announcers (ESPN+): Courtney Lyle (pxp), Brandon Weeden (analyst), Shane Sparks (sideline)

Game information

First Quarter

- (11:39) ISU – Breece Hall 70 Yd Run (Andrew Mevis Kick)(Drive: 3 plays, 83 yards, 1:05; ISU 7–0)
- (07:05) WVU – Leddie Brown 2 Yd Run (Casey Legg Kick)(Drive: 12 plays, 75 yards, 4:34; TIED 7–7)
- (04:29) ISU – Tarique Milton 68 Yd pass from Brock Purdy (Andrew Mevis Kick)(Drive: 1 plays, 68 yards, 0:11; ISU 14–7)
- (00:18) WVU – Bryce Ford-Wheaton 20 Yd pass from Jarret Doege (Casey Legg Kick)(Drive: 9 plays, 75 yards, 4:11; TIED 14–14)

Second Quarter

- (09:29) WVU – Casey Legg 31 Yd Field Goal(Drive: 8 plays, 31 yards, 3:59; WVU 17–14)
- (00:18) ISU – Andrew Mevis 34 Yd Field Goal(Drive: 7 plays, 41 yards, 1:00; TIED 17–17)

Third Quarter

- (11:07) ISU – Jake Hummel 24 Yd Interception Return (Andrew Mevis Kick)(Drive: 1 plays, 24 yards, 0:02; ISU 24–17)
- (08:36) WVU – Bryce Ford-Wheaton 23 Yd pass from Jarret Doege (Casey Legg Kick)(Drive: 5 plays, 75 yards, 2:31; TIED 24–24)
- (06:06) ISU – Brock Purdy 1 Yd Run (Andrew Mevis Kick)(Drive: 5 plays, 64 yards, 2:22; ISU 31–24)

Fourth Quarter

- (14:49) WVU – Winston Wright Jr. 22 Yd pass from Jarret Doege (Casey Legg Kick)(Drive: 12 plays, 75 yards, 6:17; TIED 31–31)
- (09:25) WVU – Leddie Brown 2 Yd Run (Casey Legg Kick)(Drive: 6 plays, 85 yards, 2:17; WVU 38–31)

Statistics	ISU	WVU
First downs	16	28
Total yards	424	492
Rushes/yards	34/239	29/122
Passing yards	185	370
Passing: Comp–Att–Int	16–27–0	30–47–2
Turnovers	1	2
Time of possession	25:42	34:18

Team	Category	Player	Statistics
Iowa State	Passing	Brock Purdy	16–27, 185 YDS, 1 TD
Iowa State	Rushing	Breece Hall	24 CAR, 167 YDS, 1 TD
Iowa State	Receiving	Tarique Milton	1 REC, 68 YDS, 1 TD
West Virginia	Passing	Jarret Doege	30-46, 370 YDS, 3 TD, 2 INT
West Virginia	Rushing	Leddie Brown	22 CAR, 109 YDS, 2 TD
West Virginia	Receiving	Bryce Ford-Wheaton	3 REC, 54 YDS, 1 TD

=== Oklahoma State ===
No. 11 Oklahoma State Cowboys (7–1) vs. West Virginia Mountaineers (4–4)

Quarter	1	2	3	4	Total
No. 11 Oklahoma State	0	10	7	7	24
West Virginia	3	0	0	0	3

at Milan Puskar Stadium • Morgantown, WV

- Date: Saturday, November 6, 2021
- Game time: 2:30 p.m. CDT
- Game weather: Sunny • Temperature: 55
- Game attendance: 50,109
- TV announcers (ESPN): Bob Wischusen (play-by-play), Dan Orlovsky (analyst) and Kris Budden (sideline)

Game information

First Quarter

- (9:21) UVU – Casey Legg 30 yard FG (Drive: 11 plays, 64 yards, 5:33; WVU 3–0)

Second Quarter

- (8:32) OSU – Spencer Sanders 6 yard pass to Tay Martin, Tanner Brown kick (Drive: 7 plays, 53 yards, 2:53; OSU 7–3)
- (1:10) OSU – Tanner Brown 34 yard FG (Drive: 11 plays, 53 yards, 4:48; OSU 10–3)

Third Quarter

- (5:30) OSU – Spencer Sanders 12 yard pass to Tay Martin, Tanner Brown kick (Drive: 4 plays, 26 yards, 1:43; OSU 17–3)

Fourth Quarter

- (13:20) OSU – Jaylen Warren 13 yard rush, Tanner Brown kick (Drive: 4 plays, 45 yards, 1:40; OSU 24–3)

Statistics	OKST	WVU
First downs	17	11
Total yards	285	133
Rushes/yards	32/103	33/17
Passing yards	182	116
Passing: Comp–Att–Int	21–31–1	16–24–1
Time of possession	28:52	31:08

Team	Category	Player	Statistics
Oklahoma State	Passing	Spencer Sanders	22/31, 182 yards, 2 TD's, 1 INT
Oklahoma State	Rushing	Jaylen Warren	16 carries, 78 yards, 1 TD
Oklahoma State	Receiving	Tay Martin	7 receptions, 63 yards, 2 TD's
West Virginia	Passing	Jarret Doege	16/24,116 yards, 1 INT
West Virginia	Rushing	Tony Mathis	5 carries, 25 yards
West Virginia	Receiving	Sam James	5 receptions, 46 yards

=== At Kansas State ===
Team	1	2	3	4	Total
West Virginia	0	3	7	7	17
• Kansas State	14	3	7	10	34

- Date: November 13
- Location: Manhattan, KS
- Game start: 11:00 a.m.
- Game attendance: 43,932
- Game weather: 36 degree, wind S 4mph, Sunny
- Referee: Brandon Cruse
- TV announcers (FS1): Eric Collins, Robert Smith
- Sources: ESPN box score ESPN team stats

Statistics	West Virginia	Kansas State
First downs	20	15
Total yards	345	299
Rushing yards	77	161
Passing yards	268	138
Turnovers	3	0
Time of possession	26:32	33:28

Team	Category	Player	Statistics
West Virginia	Passing	Jarret Doege	27/45, 268 yards, 2 TD, 2 INT
West Virginia	Rushing	Leddie Brown	20 carries, 85 yards, 0 TD
West Virginia	Receiving	Bryce Ford-Wheaton	5 catches, 67 yards, O TD
Kansas State	Passing	Skylar Thompson	14/19, 138 yards, 1 TD, 0 INT
Kansas State	Rushing	Deuce Vaughn	25 carries, 121 yards, 1 TD
Kansas State	Receiving	Phillip Brooks	5 catches, 62 yards, 0 TD

=== Texas ===
Team	1	2	3	4	Total
Texas	0	10	7	6	23
• West Virginia	7	14	7	3	31

- Date: November 20
- Location: Milan Puskar Stadium (Morgantown, WV)
- Game start: 11:00 a.m.
- Game attendance: 48,755
- Game weather: 42, Cloudy, Wind S @ 6 mph
- Referee: Scott Campbell
- TV announcers (ESPN2): Anish Shroff (play-by-play), Mike Golic Jr. (color), and Taylor McGregor (sideline)
- Sources:Stats

Statistics	Texas	West Virginia
First downs	16	28
Total yards	355	459
Rushing yards	203	158
Passing yards	152	301
Turnovers	1	0
Time of possession	21:24	38:36

Team	Category	Player	Statistics
Texas	Passing	Hudson Card	10-16, 123 yards, 1 TD, 0 INT
Texas	Rushing	Keilan Robinson	9 carries, 111 yards, 1 TD
Texas	Receiving	Xavier Worthy	7 receptions, 85 yards, 1 TD
West Virginia	Passing	Jarret Doege	27-43, 290 yards, 3 TD, 0 INT
West Virginia	Rushing	Leddie Brown	33 carries, 158 yards, 1 TD
West Virginia	Receiving	Winston Wright	6 receptions, 67 yards, 1 TD

=== At Kansas ===
West Virginia Mountaineers (5–6) vs. Kansas Jayhawks (2–9)

Quarter	1	2	3	4	Total
West Virginia	7	14	10	3	34
Kansas	6	7	8	7	28

at David Booth Kansas Memorial Stadium • Lawrence, KS

- Date: Saturday, November 27, 2021
- Game time: 6:00 pm CDT
- Game weather: Sunny • Temperature: 52 °F (11 °C)
- Game attendance: 23,117
- Referee: Tuta Salaam
- TV announcers (FS1): Guy Haberman, Charles Arbuckle

Game information

First quarter

- (11:14) KU – Jacob Borcila 46 field goal (Drive: 8 plays 47 yards, 3:37; KU 3–0)
- (5:28) WVU – Jarret Doege 14 yard pass to Winston Wright Jr., Casey Legg kick good (Drive: 6 plays 84 yards, 2:50; WVU 7–3)
- (2:07) KU – Jacob Borcila 35 yard field goal (Drive: 8 plays 61 yards, 3:13; WVU 7–6)

Second quarter

- (10:02) WVU – Jarret Doege 14 yard pass Winston Wright Jr., Casey Legg kick good (Drive: 14 plays 75 yards, 6:59; WVU 14–6)
- (7:24) KU – Jalon Daniels 8 yard pass complete to Jared Casey, Jacob Borcila kick good (Drive: 5 plays 65 yards, 2:41; WVU 14–13)
- (0:17) WVU – Jarret Doege 7 yard pass to Sam James, Casey Legg kick good (Drive: 6 plays 59 yards, 1:23; WVU 21–13)

Third quarter

- (12:33) KU – Gaven Potter 27 yard interception return, Jalon Daniels pass to Earl Bostick Jr. good (Drive: 1 play 0 yards, 0:09; 21–21)
- (8:32) WVU – Leddie Brown 44 yard run, Casey Legg kick good (Drive: 9 plays 75 yards, 3:58; WVU 28–21)
- (0:31) WVU – Casey Legg 38 yard field goal (Drive: 9 plays 30 yards, 4:11; WVU 31–21)

Fourth quarter

- (5:53) WVU – Casey Legg 37 yard field goal (Drive: 9 plays 60 yards, 4:38; WVU 34–21)
- (1:43) KU – Jalon Daniels 3 run, Jacob Borcila kick good (Drive: 5 plays 68 yards, 1:02; WVU 34–28)

Statistics	WVU	KU
First downs	15	23
Total yards	436	336
Rush yards	261	87
Passing yards	175	249
Turnovers	2	2
Time of possession	32:28	26:37

Team	Category	Player	Statistics
West Virginia	Passing	Jarret Doege	16/21 170 yards 3 TD 1 INT
West Virginia	Rushing	Leddie Brown	19 carries 156 yards 1 TD
West Virginia	Receiving	Sean Ryan	5 receptions 87 yards
Kansas	Passing	Jalon Daniels	22/32 249 yards 1 TD 2 INT
Kansas	Rushing	Amauri Pesek-Hickson	12 carries 69 yards
Kansas	Receiving	Luke Grimm	4 receptions 105 yards

=== Vs. Minnesota (Guaranteed Rate Bowl) ===
West Virginia Mountaineers (6–6) vs. Minnesota Golden Gophers (8–4) (2021 Guaranteed Rate Bowl)

Quarter	1	2	3	4	Total
West Virginia	0	6	0	0	6
Minnesota	0	15	3	0	18

at Chase Field • Phoenix, Arizona

- Date: Tuesday, December 28, 2021
- Game time: 10:15 p.m. EST (8:15 p.m. local MST)
- Game attendance: 21,220
- TV announcers (ESPN): Dave Flemming (play-by-play), Rod Gilmore (analyst), and Stormy Buonantony (sideline)
- Box score

Game information

First quarter
No scoring plays
Second quarter

- 14:19 MIN – Daniel Faalele 2-yard rush, Brock Annexstad conversion rush good. Drive: 7 plays, 54 yards, 4:00. Minnesota 8–0
- 8:48 WVU – Jarret Doege 1-yard rush, conversion pass incomplete. Drive: 12 plays, 75 yards, 5:31. Minnesota 8–6
- 2:14 MIN – Ky Thomas 5-yard rush, Matthew Trickett kick good. Drive: 14 plays, 61 yards, 2:17. Minnesota 15–6

Third quarter

- 5:53 MIN – Matthew Trickett 49-yard field goal. Drive: 8 plays, 39 yards, 4:58. Minnesota 18–6

Fourth quarter
No scoring plays

=== Statistics ===
Statistics	WVU	MIN
First downs	16	17
Plays–yards	58–206	64–358
Rushes–yards	27–66	51–249
Passing yards	140	109
Passing: comp–att–int	18–31–1	8–13–1
Time of possession	21:31	38:29

Team	Category	Player	Statistics
West Virginia	Passing	Jarret Doege	18/31, 140 yards, INT
West Virginia	Rushing	Tony Mathis Jr.	13 carries, 56 yards
West Virginia	Receiving	Sam James	3 receptions, 40 yards
Minnesota	Passing	Tanner Morgan	8/13, 109 yards, INT
Minnesota	Rushing	Ky Thomas	21 carries, 144 yards, TD
Minnesota	Receiving	Dylan Wright	2 receptions, 58 yards

== Rankings ==
Ranking movements Legend: ██ Increase in ranking ██ Decrease in ranking — = Not ranked RV = Received votes
	Week															
Poll	Pre	1	2	3	4	5	6	7	8	9	10	11	12	13	14	Final
AP	RV	—	—	RV	—											
Coaches	RV	—	—	RV	—											
CFP	Not released															Not released

== Coaching staff ==
Coach	Title	Year at West Virginia	Previous job
Neal Brown	Head Coach	3rd	Troy
Matt Moore	Assistant Head Coach/OL	3rd	Troy Co-OC/OL
Gerad Parker	OC/WR	2nd	Penn State (WR/PGC)
Chad Scott	Co-OC/RB	3rd	Louisville (RB)
Jeff Koonz	ILB/ST	2nd	Ole Miss (ILB)
Jordan Lesley	Co-DC/OLB	3rd	Troy (DL)
Andrew Jackson	DL	1st	Old Dominion (DL)
Sean Reagan	QB	3rd	Troy (Co-OC/QB)
Travis Trickett	TE/IWR	3rd	Georgia State (OC/QB)
Jahmile Addae	Co-DC/DB	1st	Louisville (DB)
Dontae Wright	S	2nd	Western Michigan (S)
