= 2021 Minnesota Golden Gophers football team =

American college football season

2021 Minnesota Golden Gophers football

Guaranteed Rate Bowl champion

Guaranteed Rate Bowl, W 18–6 vs. West Virginia
- Conference: Big Ten Conference
- West Division
- Record: 9–4 (6–3 Big Ten)
- Head coach: P. J. Fleck (5th season)
- Offensive coordinator: Mike Sanford Jr. (2nd season)
- Co-offensive coordinator: Matt Simon (2nd season)
- Offensive scheme: Spread option
- Defensive coordinator: Joe Rossi (4th season)
- Co-defensive coordinator: Joe Harasymiak (2nd season)
- Base defense: 4–3
- Home stadium: Huntington Bank Stadium

Uniform
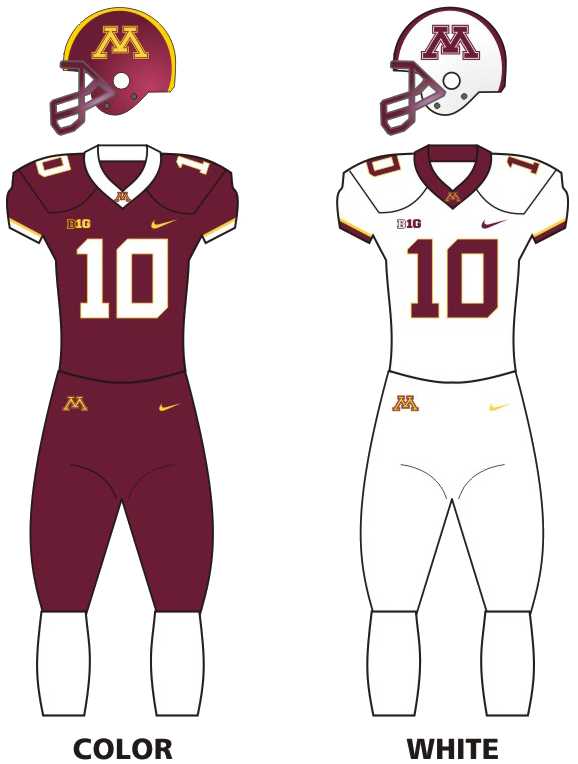

2021 Big Ten Conference football standings
	Conf.			Overall
Team	W		L	W		L
East Division
No. 3 Michigan xy$^	8	–	1	12	–	2
No. 6 Ohio State x	8	–	1	11	–	2
No. 9 Michigan State	7	–	2	11	–	2
Penn State	4	–	5	7	–	6
Maryland	3	–	6	7	–	6
Rutgers	2	–	7	5	–	8
Indiana	0	–	9	2	–	10
West Division
No. 23 Iowa xy	7	–	2	10	–	4
Minnesota	6	–	3	9	–	4
Wisconsin	6	–	3	9	–	4
Purdue	6	–	3	9	–	4
Illinois	4	–	5	5	–	7
Nebraska	1	–	8	3	–	9
Northwestern	1	–	8	3	–	9
Championship: Michigan 42, Iowa 3
^ – College Football Playoff participant; $ – Conference champion; x – Division champion/co-champions; y – Championship game participant; Rankings from AP Poll

The 2021 Minnesota Golden Gophers football team represented the University of Minnesota during the 2021 NCAA Division I FBS football season. The Golden Gophers played their home games at Huntington Bank Stadium in Minneapolis, Minnesota, and competed in the West Division of the Big Ten Conference. They were led by fifth-year head coach P. J. Fleck.

== Schedule ==
Date	Time	Opponent	Rank	Site	TV	Result	Attendance
September 2	7:00 p.m.	No. 4 Ohio State		Huntington Bank Stadium; Minneapolis, MN	FOX	L 31–45	50,805
September 11	11:00 a.m.	Miami (OH)*		Huntington Bank Stadium; Minneapolis, MN	ESPNU	W 31–26	43,372
September 18	12:00 p.m.	at Colorado*		Folsom Field; Boulder, CO	P12N	W 30–0	47,482
September 25	11:00 a.m.	Bowling Green*^{†}		Huntington Bank Stadium; Minneapolis, MN	ESPNU	L 10–14	46,236
October 2	11:00 a.m.	at Purdue		Ross–Ade Stadium; West Lafayette, IN	BTN	W 20–13	51,111
October 16	11:00 a.m.	Nebraska		Huntington Bank Stadium; Minneapolis, MN ($5 Bits of Broken Chair Trophy)	ESPN2	W 30–23	45,436
October 23	2:30 p.m.	Maryland		Huntington Bank Stadium; Minneapolis, MN	ESPN2	W 34–16	41,011
October 30	2:30 p.m.	at Northwestern		Ryan Field; Evanston, IL	BTN	W 41–14	28,158
November 6	11:00 a.m.	Illinois	No. 20	Huntington Bank Stadium; Minneapolis, MN	ESPN2	L 6–14	46,382
November 13	2:30 p.m.	at No. 20 Iowa		Kinnick Stadium; Iowa City, IA (Floyd of Rosedale)	BTN	L 22–27	69,250
November 20	2:30 p.m.	at Indiana		Memorial Stadium; Bloomington, IN	BTN	W 35–14	38,079
November 27	3:00 p.m.	No. 14 Wisconsin		Huntington Bank Stadium; Minneapolis, MN (Paul Bunyan's Axe)	FOX	W 23–13	49,736
December 28	9:15 p.m.	vs. West Virginia*		Chase Field; Phoenix, AZ (Guaranteed Rate Bowl)	ESPN	W 18–6	21,220
*Non-conference game; ^{†}Homecoming; Rankings from AP Poll (and CFP Rankings, after November 2) - Released prior to game; All times are in Central time

== Game summaries ==
=== vs No. 4 Ohio State ===
Ohio State at Minnesota

Team	1	2	3	4	Total
• No. 4 Ohio State	7	3	21	14	45
Minnesota	0	14	7	10	31

- Date: September 2, 2021
- Location:
  Huntington Bank Stadium
  Minneapolis, MN
- Game start: 8:00 p.m. EST
- Elapsed time: 3:32
- Game attendance: 50,582
- Referee: Reggie Smith
- TV announcers (FOX): Gus Johnson (play-by-play), Joel Klatt (analyst) and Jenny Taft (sideline)

The Golden Gophers opens the 2021 season at Huntington Bank Stadium, where they will host the 4th ranked team in the nation the Ohio State Buckeyes. This will be the 51st meeting between the 2 teams, with Ohio State having a winning record against the Gophers at 44–7–0. The Buckeyes have won 10 straight, which is their 2nd longest current Big Ten winning Streak. The teams last met in 2018, with the Buckeyes winning 30–14 at Ohio Stadium.

The TV Broadcast on Fox was the fourth most-watched broadcast television program of the week, averaging 6.295 million viewers. That is the largest audience for an opening-week college football telecast on Fox.

Statistics	Ohio State	Minnesota
First downs	17	23
Plays–yards	48-495	75-409
Rushes–yards	26-201	50-203
Passing yards	294	206
Passing: comp–att–int	13-22-1	14-25-0
Time of possession	21:19	38:41

Team	Category	Player	Statistics
Ohio State	Passing	C. J. Stroud	13-22, 294 yds, 4 TD, 1 INT
Ohio State	Rushing	Miyan Williams	9 car, 125 yds, 1 TD
Ohio State	Receiving	Chris Olave	4 receptions, 117 yds, 2 TD
Minnesota	Passing	Tanner Morgan	14-25, 205 yds, 1 TD
Minnesota	Rushing	Mohamed Ibrahim	30 car, 153 yds, 2 TD
Minnesota	Receiving	Daniel Jackson	3 rec, 58 yds

Scoring summary

Quarter	Time	Drive			Team	Scoring information	Score	
Quarter	Time	Plays	Yards	TOP	Team	Scoring information	Ohio State	Minnesota
1st	7:22	5	92	1:42	OSU	Miyan Williams 71-yard touchdown run, Noah Ruggles kick good	7	0
2nd	12:50	14	74	6:47	OSU	35-yard field goal by Ruggles	10	0
2nd	9:11	6	80	3:39	MINN	Dylan Wright 13-yard touchdown reception from Tanner Morgan, Matthew Trickett kick good	10	7
2nd	3:32	8	37	4:31	MINN	Mohamed Ibrahim 1-yard touchdown run, Trickett kick good	10	14
3rd	12:43	7	81	2:17	OSU	Chris Olave 38-yard touchdown reception from C. J. Stroud, Ruggles kick good	17	14
3rd	10:03	5	75	2:40	MINN	Ibrahim 19-yard touchdown run, Trickett kick good	17	21
3rd	5:12	1	56	0:08	OSU	Garrett Wilson 56-yard touchdown reception from Stroud, Ruggles kick good	24	21
3rd	2:18	5	7	2:54	OSU	Fumble recovery returned 32 yards for touchdown by Haskell Garrett, Ruggles kick good	31	21
4th	10:39	12	47	6:39	MINN	46-yard field goal by Trickett	31	24
4th	9:43	3	75	0:56	OSU	TreVeyon Henderson 70-yard touchdown reception from Stroud, Ruggles kick good	38	24
4th	5:31	9	75	4:12	MINN	Bryce Williams 2-yard touchdown run, Trickett kick good	38	31
4th	4:39	2	75	0:52	OSU	Olave 61-yard touchdown reception from Stroud, Ruggles kick good	45	31
"TOP" = time of possession. For other American football terms, see Glossary of American football.							45	31

=== vs No. 14 Wisconsin ===
Wisconsin at Minnesota

Team	1	2	3	4	Total
No. 14 Wisconsin	0	10	3	0	13
• Minnesota	3	3	14	3	23

- Date: November 27, 2021
- Location:
  Huntington Bank Stadium
  Minneapolis, MN
- Game start: 4:00 p.m. EST
- Game attendance: 49,736
- Game weather: Sunny 38 degrees, Wind NW @ 9 mph
- TV announcers (FOX): Tim Brando (play by play), Spencer Tillman (analyst)

Statistics	Wisconsin	Minnesota
First downs	19	16
Plays–yards	60-203	53-278
Rushes–yards	22-62	35-79
Passing yards	171	199
Passing: comp–att–int	21-38-1	11-16-1
Time of possession	29:53	30:07

Team	Category	Player	Statistics
Wisconsin	Passing	Graham Mertz	21-38, 162 yds, 1 INT
Wisconsin	Rushing	Braelon Allen	17 car, 47 yds
Wisconsin	Receiving	Danny Davis III	5 rec, 60 yds
Minnesota	Passing	Tanner Morgan	11-16, 199 yds, 1 TD, 1 INT
Minnesota	Rushing	Ky Thomas	18 car, 55 yds, 1 TD
Minnesota	Receiving	Brevyn Spann-Ford	3 rec, 62 yds

=== vs. West Virginia (Guaranteed Rate Bowl) ===
West Virginia Mountaineers (6–6) vs. Minnesota Golden Gophers (8–4) (2021 Guaranteed Rate Bowl)

Quarter	1	2	3	4	Total
West Virginia	0	6	0	0	6
Minnesota	0	15	3	0	18

at Chase Field • Phoenix, Arizona

- Date: Tuesday, December 28, 2021
- Game time: 10:15 p.m. EST (8:15 p.m. local MST)
- Game attendance: 21,220
- TV announcers (ESPN): Dave Flemming (play-by-play), Rod Gilmore (analyst), and Stormy Buonantony (sideline)
- Box score

Game information

First quarter
No scoring plays
Second quarter

- 14:19 MIN – Daniel Faalele 2-yard rush, Brock Annexstad conversion rush good. Drive: 7 plays, 54 yards, 4:00. Minnesota 8–0
- 8:48 WVU – Jarret Doege 1-yard rush, conversion pass incomplete. Drive: 12 plays, 75 yards, 5:31. Minnesota 8–6
- 2:14 MIN – Ky Thomas 5-yard rush, Matthew Trickett kick good. Drive: 14 plays, 61 yards, 2:17. Minnesota 15–6

Third quarter

- 5:53 MIN – Matthew Trickett 49-yard field goal. Drive: 8 plays, 39 yards, 4:58. Minnesota 18–6

Fourth quarter
No scoring plays

=== Statistics ===
Statistics	WVU	MIN
First downs	16	17
Plays–yards	58–206	64–358
Rushes–yards	27–66	51–249
Passing yards	140	109
Passing: comp–att–int	18–31–1	8–13–1
Time of possession	21:31	38:29

Team	Category	Player	Statistics
West Virginia	Passing	Jarret Doege	18/31, 140 yards, INT
West Virginia	Rushing	Tony Mathis Jr.	13 carries, 56 yards
West Virginia	Receiving	Sam James	3 receptions, 40 yards
Minnesota	Passing	Tanner Morgan	8/13, 109 yards, INT
Minnesota	Rushing	Ky Thomas	21 carries, 144 yards, TD
Minnesota	Receiving	Dylan Wright	2 receptions, 58 yards

== Roster ==
2021 Minnesota Golden Gophers football team roster
Players
Coaches
Offense

Pos.	#	Name	Class
WR	0	Lemeke Brockington	Fr
RB	1	Cam Wiley	So
QB	2	Tanner Morgan	Sr
RB	3	Treyson Potts	So
RB	4	Mar'Keise Irving	Fr
QB	5	Zack Annexstad	Jr
WR	6	Douglas Emilien	Fr
WR	7	Chris Autman-Bell	Sr
RB	8	Ky Thomas	Fr
WR	9	Daniel Jackson	So
QB	11	Lonenoa Faoa	Fr
QB	12	Cole Kramer	So
WR	14	Brady Boyd	Fr
QB	15	Jacob Clark	So
WR	16	Dylan Wright	So
QB	17	Athan Kaliakmanis	Fr
WR	18	Clay Geary	Sr
QB	19	Samuel Pickerign	Sr
WR	20	Larry Wright	So
RB	21	Bryce Williams	Jr
WR	22	Mike Brown-Stephens	So
WR	23	Dylan Hillard-McGill	Fr
RB	24	Mohamed Ibrahim (injured)	Sr
RB	25	Preston Jelen	Jr
WR	27	Quentin Redding	Fr
RB	31	Kendall Moore	Fr
TE	42	Ko Kieft	Sr
TE	47	Wyatt Schroeder	Fr
OL	50	J. J. Guedet	So
OL	55	Karter Shaw	Jr
OL	56	Curtis Dunlap Jr.	Jr
OL	57	Cameron James	Fr
OL	58	Jackson Hunter	Fr
OL	60	John Michael Schmitz	Sr
OL	63	Austin Beier	Jr
OL	64	Conner Olson	Sr
OL	65	Axel Ruschmeyer	Sr
OL	66	Nathan Boe	Jr
OL	68	Jackson Ruschmeyer	Fr
OL	69	Aireontae Ersery	Fr
OL	70	Sam Schlueter	Sr
OL	71	Martes Lewis	Fr
OL	73	Tyrell Lawrence	Fr
OL	75	Tyler Cooper	So
OL	76	Saia Mapakaitolo	Fr
OL	77	Blaise Andries	Sr
OL	78	Daniel Faalele	Sr
OL	79	Logan Purcell	Fr
WR	80	Dino Kaliakmanis	Fr
WR	81	Brock Annexstad	Sr
WR	82	Jonathan Mann	Fr
TE	83	Austin Henderson	Fr
WR	84	Peter Udoibok	So
TE	85	Bryce Witham	Sr
TE	86	Jameson Geers	Fr
TE	87	Nick Kallerup	So
TE	88	Brevyn Spann-Ford	Jr
WR	89	Nnamdi Adim-Madumere	So

Defense

Pos.	#	Name	Class
DB	0	Justin Walley	Fr
DB	1	Calvin Swenson	Sr
DB	2	Phillip Howard	Sr
DL	3	M. J. Anderson	So
DB	4	Terell Smith	Sr
DL	5	Nyles Pinckney	GS
DB	6	Miles Fleming	Fr
DB	7	Solomon Brown	So
DL	8	Thomas Rush	Sr
DL	9	Esezi Otomewo	Sr
DB	11	Michael Dixon	So
DB	12	Jalen Glaze	Fr
LB	13	James Gordon IV	So
LB	14	Braelen Oliver	So
LB	15	Jaqwondis Burns	Fr
DB	16	Coney Durr	Sr
DL	17	Gage Keys	Fr
DL	18	Micah Dew-Treadway	GS
LB	20	Donald Willis	So
DB	21	Justus Harris	GS
DB	22	Steven Ortiz Jr.	Fr
DB	23	Jordan Howden	Sr
DB	26	Victor Pless	Fr
DB	27	Tyler Nubin	Jr
DB	28	Matt Guggemos	So
LB	29	Josh Aune	Jr
DB	30	Jordan Nubin	Fr
LB	33	Devon Williams	Fr
DL	34	Boye Mafe	Sr
LB	35	Derik LeCaptain	So
DB	36	Bishop McDonald	GS
LB	41	Connor Keyes	Fr
LB	43	Eli Mau	Fr
DL	44	Rashad Cheney Jr.	So
LB	45	Cody Lindenberg	So
LB	46	Lucas Finnessy	Fr
LB	47	Jack Gibbens	GS
LB	49	Pete Bercich	So
DL	52	Luther McCoy	Fr
LB	53	Ben Wileman	Fr
LB	55	Mariano Sori-Marin	Sr
DL	56	Val Martin	GS
LB	57	Jack Kern	Jr
DL	62	Jacob Schuster	Fr
DL	89	Nate Becker	Fr
DL	90	Jah Joyner	Fr
DL	91	Deven Eastern	Fr
DL	92	Danny Striggow	Fr
DL	94	Austin Booker	Fr
DL	96	Logan Richter	So
DL	97	Jalen Logan-Redding	Fr
DL	99	DeAngelo Carter	So

Special teams

Pos.	#	Name	Class
K	34	Brock Walker	Jr
LS	37	Brady Weeks	Jr
P	38	Daniel Sparks	So
LS	49	Austin Sullivan	So
K	91	Will Mobley	Sr
K	95	Matthew Trickett	Sr
P	96	Mark Crawford	So
K	99	Dragan Kesich	So

Head coach

- P. J. Fleck (head coach)

Coordinators/assistant coaches

- Mike Sanford Jr. (offensive coordinator / quarterbacks)
- Joe Rossi (defensive coordinator / linebackers)
- Rob Wenger (special teams coordinator / outside linebackers)
- Kenni Burns (assistant head coach / running backs)
- Paul Haynes (cornerbacks)
- Brian Callahan (run game coordinators / offensive line)
- Joe Harasymiak (defensive backs / safeties)
- Chad Wilt (defensive line)
- Clay Patterson (tight ends)
- Matt Simon (passing game coordinator / wide receivers)
- Gerrit Chernoff (general manager)
- Dan Nichol (head strength & conditioning)
- Norries Wilson (director of player development)

Legend

- (C) Team captain
- (S) Suspended
- (I) Ineligible
- Injured
- Redshirt

Roster
Last update: December 28, 2021
