= 2021 Guaranteed Rate Bowl =

Postseason college football bowl game

- 32nd Guaranteed Rate Bowl
West Virginia Mountaineers	Minnesota Golden Gophers
(6–6)	(8–4)
Big 12	Big Ten
6	18
Head coach: Neal Brown	Head coach: P. J. Fleck
	1	2	3	4	Total
West Virginia	0	6	0	0	6
Minnesota	0	15	3	0	18
- Date: December 28, 2021
- Season: 2021
- Stadium: Chase Field
- Location: Phoenix, Arizona
- MVP: Ky Thomas (RB, Minnesota) & Tyler Nubin (S, Minnesota)
- Favorite: Minnesota by 4
- Referee: Jeff Flanagan (ACC)
- Attendance: 21,220

United States TV coverage
- Network: ESPN; ESPN Radio
- Announcers: ESPN: Dave Flemming (play-by-play), Rod Gilmore (analyst), and Stormy Buonantony (sideline); ESPN Radio: Beth Mowins (play-by-play), Kirk Morrison (analyst), and Dawn Davenport (sideline)

The 2021 Guaranteed Rate Bowl was a college football bowl game played on December 28, 2021, with kickoff at 10:15 p.m. EST (8:15 p.m. local MST) and televised on ESPN. It was the 32nd edition of the Guaranteed Rate Bowl, although the first played under that name (the 2020 edition was canceled due to an insufficient number of teams being available to fill all bowl slots) and was one of the 2021–22 bowl games concluding the 2021 FBS football season. Residential mortgage company Guaranteed Rate was the game's title sponsor.

== Teams ==
Consistent with conference tie-ins, the game was played between teams from the Big 12 Conference and the Big Ten Conference.

This was first time that Minnesota and West Virginia ever played each other.

=== West Virginia Mountaineers ===
West Virginia finished their regular season with an overall 6–6 record, 4–5 in Big 12 games. After starting their season with four losses in their first six games, the Mountaineers won four of their final six games to become bowl eligible. West Virginia played four ranked opponents, losing to Oklahoma and Oklahoma State while defeating Virginia Tech and Iowa State.

=== Minnesota Golden Gophers ===
Minnesota finished their regular season with an overall 8–4 record, 6–3 in Big Ten games. The Golden Gophers were ranked 20th after winning six of their first eight games, but then lost two of their final four games. Minnesota played three ranked teams, losing to Ohio State and Iowa while defeating Wisconsin.

== Game summary ==
2021 Guaranteed Rate Bowl

Quarter	1	2	3	4	Total
West Virginia	0	6	0	0	6
Minnesota	0	15	3	0	18

at Chase Field • Phoenix, Arizona

- Date: Tuesday, December 28, 2021
- Game time: 10:15 p.m. EST (8:15 p.m. local MST)
- Game attendance: 21,220
- TV announcers (ESPN): Dave Flemming (play-by-play), Rod Gilmore (analyst), and Stormy Buonantony (sideline)
- Box score

Game information

First quarter
No scoring plays
Second quarter

- 14:19 MIN – Daniel Faalele 2-yard rush, Brock Annexstad conversion rush good. Drive: 7 plays, 54 yards, 4:00. Minnesota 8–0
- 8:48 WVU – Jarret Doege 1-yard rush, conversion pass incomplete. Drive: 12 plays, 75 yards, 5:31. Minnesota 8–6
- 2:14 MIN – Ky Thomas 5-yard rush, Matthew Trickett kick good. Drive: 14 plays, 61 yards, 2:17. Minnesota 15–6

Third quarter

- 5:53 MIN – Matthew Trickett 49-yard field goal. Drive: 8 plays, 39 yards, 4:58. Minnesota 18–6

Fourth quarter
No scoring plays

=== Statistics ===
Statistics	WVU	MIN
First downs	16	17
Plays–yards	58–206	64–358
Rushes–yards	27–66	51–249
Passing yards	140	109
Passing: comp–att–int	18–31–1	8–13–1
Turnovers		
Time of possession	21:31	38:29

Team	Category	Player	Statistics
West Virginia	Passing	Jarret Doege	18/31, 140 yards, INT
West Virginia	Rushing	Tony Mathis Jr.	13 carries, 56 yards
West Virginia	Receiving	Sam James	3 receptions, 40 yards
Minnesota	Passing	Tanner Morgan	8/13, 109 yards, INT
Minnesota	Rushing	Ky Thomas	21 carries, 144 yards, TD
Minnesota	Receiving	Dylan Wright	2 receptions, 58 yards

== Externals links ==
- Game statistics at statbroadcast.com
