= Neal Brown =

American football player and coach (born 1980)

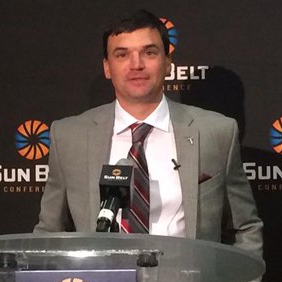
- Brown at 2015 Sun Belt Media Day

Current position
- Title: Head coach
- Team: North Texas
- Conference: American
- Record: 7–4

Biographical details
- Born: March 11, 1980 (age 46); Danville, Kentucky, U.S.
- Education: UMass

Playing career
- 1998–2000: Kentucky
- 2001–2002: UMass
- Position: Wide receiver

Coaching career (HC unless noted)
- 2003: UMass (TE/AOL)
- 2004: Sacred Heart (QB/WR)
- 2005: Delaware (WR)
- 2006–2007: Troy (IWR)
- 2008–2009: Troy (OC/QB)
- 2010–2012: Texas Tech (OC/QB)
- 2013–2014: Kentucky (OC/QB)
- 2015–2018: Troy
- 2019–2024: West Virginia
- 2025: Texas (AHC)
- 2026–present: North Texas

Head coaching record
- Overall: 79–55
- Bowls: 5–1

Accomplishments and honors

Championships
- Sun Belt (2017); Sun Belt East Division (2018)

Awards
- Sun Belt Coach of the Year (2017)

Neal Brown (born March 11, 1980) is an American football coach and former player who is currently the head football coach at the University of North Texas. He previously served as the head coach at West Virginia University from 2019 to 2024 and Troy University from 2015 to 2018. Brown also previously served as the offensive coordinator at Troy (2008–2009), Texas Tech University (2010–2012), and the University of Kentucky (2013–2014).

== Early years ==
Brown attended Boyle County High School in Danville, Kentucky, where he was an all-state wide receiver.

He played football at the University of Kentucky under head coach Hal Mumme and his assistants, Mike Leach and Tony Franklin, before transferring to the University of Massachusetts Amherst.

== Coaching career ==
=== Early coaching career ===
Brown started his coaching career as a graduate assistant at UMass. Before joining Larry Blakeney's staff at Troy to work under Tony Franklin, he spent one-year assistant coaching stints at UMass, Sacred Heart, and Delaware. Following Franklin's departure to Auburn at the end of the 2007 regular season, Brown was promoted to offensive coordinator at Troy. When he was hired, he became the youngest coordinator in all FBS football.

=== Texas Tech ===
On January 12, 2010, Brown was announced as the offensive coordinator at Texas Tech under new Red Raiders head coach Tommy Tuberville. During the 2010 football season, the Red Raider offense performed well. During his tenure at Texas Tech, Brown perfected his NASCAR spread offense. The offense created by Brown focused on players running to the line immediately after the play and quickly snapping the ball before the defense could get set. The offense requires speed at every position to be run the way Brown envisions it. The focus of the offense was to snap the ball eight seconds after the previous play. The 2010 Red Raiders ranked 15th in the country in total offense, 6th in passing offense, and 72nd in rushing offense.

For his coaching performance during the 2011 41–38 upset victory over the then-ranked #3 Oklahoma Sooners, he was recognized by Rivals.com as National Coordinator of the Week.

Brown was considered for the head coaching job at his alma mater, UMass, following the 2011 season. Brown was also considered for the school's head coaching job when it opened following the 2008 season.

=== Kentucky ===
On December 9, 2012, it was reported after several weeks of speculation that Brown would return to his home state to coach the offense at Kentucky under new coach Mark Stoops.

=== Troy ===
Troy announced Brown's hire on Sunday, November 30, 2014. In 2015, Brown's Trojans posted a 4–8 record. Troy was ranked for the first time in the AP top 25 on November 13, 2016, they became the first team from the Sun Belt Conference to be ranked in the Top 25 and finished the year with a record of 10–3. This was Troy's first 10-win season since joining FBS in 2001. Troy capped off the 2016 season by winning the Dollar General Bowl in Mobile, Alabama.

In Brown's third season at the helm in 2017, he led Troy to a 3–1 start to begin the season. In the fifth game of the season on September 30, Troy faced #25-ranked LSU. With Troy leading in the third quarter by a score of 24–7, LSU began to mount a comeback in the fourth quarter by scoring 14 unanswered points and trailing just 24–21 with less than 30 seconds left in the game. LSU began to move the ball down-field before having only eight seconds left on the clock. The very next play became an interception for Troy, which sealed the upset victory. The win over LSU snapped the Tigers' 46-game non-conference home winning streak, which was the longest such streak in the country at the time. The Trojans became Sun Belt co-champions after defeating Arkansas State in a thriller, 32–25. Troy's 11–2 overall record is the program's best regular season finish since joining the FBS in 2001.

=== West Virginia ===
Brown was announced as the 35th head football coach for West Virginia University on January 5, 2019. Coming off an 8–4 (6–3) 2018 season by outgoing coach Dana Holgorsen, West Virginia was predicted to finish 8th out of 10 teams in the Big 12 media poll. After racing out to a 3–1 start to begin the 2019-20 football season, the Mountaineers lost five straight games for the first time since 2012. Three of the losses came against top-15 teams, No. 11 Texas, No. 5 Oklahoma, and No. 12 Baylor. Sitting at 3–6 (1–5) and on the verge of missing a bowl for the first time since 2013, WVU notched its only win against a ranked opponent the following week, winning at No. 24 Kansas State. With the win, WVU improved to 4–6 (2–5) and kept its bowl hopes alive. However, a loss against No. 21 Oklahoma State dashed their bowl hopes and guaranteed WVU's first losing season in six years. The Mountaineers finished the season with an upset at TCU, denying the Horned Frogs a chance at postseason play. West Virginia finished 5–7 (3–6) in Brown's first season.

Prior to Brown's second season, offensive coordinator Matt Moore was promoted to assistant head coach, and was replaced in his role as offensive coordinator by Penn State wide receivers coach Gerad Parker. Defensive coordinator Vic Koenning also resigned after allegations of mistreatment by West Virginia players. Brown promoted three defensive coaches to become co-defensive coordinators in place of Koenning. For the second straight season, West Virginia was predicted to finish 8th out of 10 teams in the Big 12 media poll. West Virginia was scheduled to open the season against Florida State, making their first appearance in the Chick-fil-A Kickoff Game since 2014. However, the game along with a matchup against rival Maryland were cancelled as a results of precautions stemming from the COVID-19 pandemic.

As a result, the Mountaineers opened the 2020-21 season with one nonconference game, a home win over FCS Eastern Kentucky. After a road loss at No. 15 Oklahoma State to begin conference play, the Mountaineers recorded two home conference wins over Baylor and Kansas for the Mountaineers' second consecutive 3–1 start. West Virginia traded road losses (Texas Tech, No. 22 Texas, No. 9 Iowa State) and home wins (No. 16 Kansas State, TCU) over the following five games to sit at 5–4 (4–4) heading into a December home matchup with No. 11 Oklahoma. The game, originally scheduled for November, had been postponed due to positive coronavirus tests within the Sooners program. However, the contest was cancelled entirely after positive coronavirus tests forced WVU to "shut down football operations" for seven days. As a result, WVU finished Brown's second season having played in just nine total regular season games, the fewest for WVU since the 1954 season. However, despite only participating in nine contests, the Mountaineers were eligible for postseason play after the NCAA waived bowl eligibility requirements. West Virginia was invited to participate in the Liberty Bowl against Tennessee, marking the Mountaineers' first appearance in the contest since 2014, their first postseason play since 2018, and only the second all-time appearance against the Volunteers. Just one day after the matchup was announced, Tennessee (3–7) announced they had paused all team activities and were unable to compete after several positive coronavirus cases. Army (9–2), who had accepted an invitation to the Independence Bowl before it was canceled due to a lack of available teams, was named as their replacement. After falling behind the Black Knights 21–10 with 7:00 left in the 3rd quarter, West Virginia rallied behind two late TD passes from Austin Kendall to complete the comeback victory, 24–21.

After finishing 6–4 (4–4) in the pandemic-shortened 2020 season, the Mountaineers were predicted to finish sixth out of ten teams in the 2021 Big 12 preseason poll, a marginal improvement over the prior two years' predicted eighth-place finishes. West Virginia opened its non-conference slate with renewed rivalry games in two of its first three contests, against Maryland and Virginia Tech, respectively. Although the Mountaineers scored three TDs with RB Leddie Brown and another in the air from QB Jarrett Doege leading to a 21–20 lead entering the 4th quarter, WVU was unable to overcome committing four turnovers and lost at Maryland, 24–30. After blanking FCS Long Island 66–0 in the Mountaineers' home opener, West Virginia played former conference rival No. 15 Virginia Tech for only the second time in 16 years and the first time at Mountaineer Field since 2005. In front of a sellout September crowd, WVU raced out to a 27–7 lead in the third quarter behind two TD passes from Jarret Doege and 161 yards and a score from Leddie Brown. However, after VT erased nearly all of its 20-point deficit, the Mountaineers won on the backs of their defense via a time expiring goal-line stand, and won the Black Diamond Trophy for the first time since 2003. It was WVU's first victory over a top-15 team in the Neal Brown era. Having finished nonconference play at 2–1, the Mountaineers opened conference play on the road against perennial favorite and reigning conference champion, Oklahoma. After opening the contest with a 17-play, 75-yard TD drive, and holding the Sooners to just 91 yards of total offense in the first half, West Virginia led No. 4 Oklahoma, 10–7, on the road at halftime. However, the Mountaineers were held to just 62 yards in the second half, and lost on a last-second FG, handing the Mountaineers a ninth-consecutive loss to Oklahoma since 2012. West Virginia then lost its next two conference games against Texas Tech and Baylor to sit at 2–4 (0–3) entering its mid-October bye week, and in serious jeopardy of missing postseason play for the second time in three years. WVU then went on the road against TCU. Despite trailing early after the Horned Frogs returned the opening kickoff 100 yards for a TD, the Mountaineers recovered behind three Leddie Brown rushing TDs, and racked up 487 yards of total offense to win 29–17 and avoid an 0–4 conference start. West Virginia returned home to face No. 22 Iowa State 5–2 (3–1), who had just upset then-undefeated No. 8 Oklahoma State the week before. Despite facing the Big 12's top defense, the Mountaineers earned 492 total yards, Jarret Doege threw for three TDs, and Leddie Brown scored two more TDs on the ground as WVU beat the Cyclones, 38–31, to improve to 4–4 (2–3) on the season. However, the Mountaineers were unable to sustain their late-October success, and dropped back-to-back contests against No. 11 Oklahoma State, and at Kansas State, meaning West Virginia (4–6) (2–5) needed to win their final two games to secure postseason eligibility. West Virginia's next matchup was against Texas, who also found themselves at 4–6 and at risk of missing postseason play for the first time since 2016. In the end, Jarret Doege threw three touchdown passes and Leddie Brown rushed for 158 yards and a score to lead West Virginia to a 31–23 victory over Texas, handing the Longhorns their sixth straight loss and eliminating them from bowl consideration. WVU secured bowl eligibility a week later when Jarret Doege threw for 170 yards and three touchdowns, Leddie Brown ran for 156 yards and another score, and the Mountaineers held off Kansas on the road, 34–28. This left the Mountaineers at 6–6 (4–5), securing WVU's second consecutive fifth-place finish. West Virginia was then invited to the Guaranteed Rate Bowl, marking their first appearance in the contest since 2016. It was West Virginia's first-ever matchup against Minnesota (8–4). The Golden Gophers dominated the contest on defense, holding the Mountaineers to just 206 total yards and one TD. West Virginia played without leading rusher Leddie Brown, who opted to skip the bowl game to prepare for the NFL. Jarret Doege threw for 140 yards and one interception in the losing effort, which would mark his final game as a Mountaineer, as he and West Virginia's leading receiver, Winston Wright, announced just days later that they were entering the transfer portal.

West Virginia fired Brown following the 2024 regular season.

=== Texas ===
In March 2025, Brown was named the special assistant to head coach Steve Sarkisian at Texas.

=== North Texas ===
On December 2, 2025, Neal Brown accepted the head coaching position at North Texas.

== Head coaching record ==
Year	Team	Overall	Conference	Standing	Bowl/playoffs	Coaches^{#}	AP^{°}
Troy Trojans (Sun Belt Conference) (2015–2018)
2015	Troy	4–8	3–5	T–5th			
2016	Troy	10–3	6–2	T–3rd	W Dollar General		
2017	Troy	11–2	7–1	T–1st	W New Orleans		
2018	Troy	10–3	7–1	T–1st (East)	W Dollar General		
Troy:		35–16	23–9				
West Virginia Mountaineers (Big 12 Conference) (2019–2024)
2019	West Virginia	5–7	3–6	T–7th			
2020	West Virginia	6–4	4–4	5th	W Liberty		
2021	West Virginia	6–7	4–5	T–5th	L Guaranteed Rate		
2022	West Virginia	5–7	3–6	T–7th			
2023	West Virginia	9–4	6–3	T–4th	W Duke's Mayo	25	
2024	West Virginia	6–6	5–4	T–8th	Frisco (Note: Did not coach bowl game)		
West Virginia:		37–35	25–28				
North Texas Mean Green (American Conference) (2026–present)
2026	North Texas	7–4	5–2				
North Texas:		7–4	5–2				
Total:		79–55					
National championship Conference title Conference division title or championship game berth
^{#}Rankings from final Coaches Poll.; ^{°}Rankings from final AP Poll.
