= 2014 Western Michigan Broncos football team =

American college football season

2014 Western Michigan Broncos football

Famous Idaho Potato Bowl, L 24–38 vs. Air Force
- Conference: Mid-American Conference
- West Division
- Record: 8–5 (6–2 MAC)
- Head coach: P. J. Fleck (2nd season)
- Offensive coordinator: Kirk Ciarrocca (2nd season)
- Offensive scheme: Spread
- Defensive coordinator: Ed Pinkham (2nd season)
- Base defense: 4–3
- Home stadium: Waldo Stadium

2014 Mid-American Conference football standings
	Conf.			Overall
Team	W		L	W		L
East Division
Bowling Green x	5	–	3	8	–	6
Ohio	4	–	4	6	–	6
Buffalo	3	–	4	5	–	6
Akron	3	–	5	5	–	7
UMass	3	–	5	3	–	9
Miami (OH)	2	–	6	2	–	10
Kent State	1	–	6	2	–	9
West Division
Northern Illinois xy$	7	–	1	11	–	3
Toledo x	7	–	1	9	–	4
Western Michigan	6	–	2	8	–	5
Central Michigan	5	–	3	7	–	6
Ball State	4	–	4	5	–	7
Eastern Michigan	1	–	7	2	–	10
Championship: Northern Illinois 51, Bowling Green 17
$ – Conference champion; x – Division champion/co-champions; y – Championship game participant

The 2014 Western Michigan Broncos football team represented Western Michigan University (WMU) in the 2014 NCAA Division I FBS football season. They were led by second-year head coach P. J. Fleck and played their home games at Waldo Stadium as a member of the West Division of the Mid-American Conference (MAC). They finished the season 8–5, 6–2 in MAC play to finish in third place in the West Division. They were invited to the Famous Idaho Potato Bowl where they lost to Air Force.

WMU lost its season opener against Purdue, 43–34. Freshman running back Jarvion Franklin rushed for 163 yards and three touchdowns on 19 carries. The 163 yards were the third-highest by a freshman in the NCAA. He was named MAC West Offensive Player of the Week.

At the end of the 2014 season, head coach P. J. Fleck was awarded with the Mid American Conference Head Coach of the Year award. Jarvion Franklin was named the MAC Offensive Player of the Year, becoming the first freshman to ever receive the honor.

== Recruiting class ==
College recruiting information (2014)
Name	Hometown	School	Height	Weight	Commit date
Lucas Bezerra; TE	Troy, MI	Troy HS	6 ft 4 in (1.93 m)	230 lb (100 kg)	Apr 13, 2013
Lucas Bezerra; TE	Recruit ratings: Scout: Rivals: (N/A)				
Jordan Billingslea; WR	Southfield, MI	Southfield HS	5 ft 8 in (1.73 m)	153 lb (69 kg)	Jul 25, 2013
Jordan Billingslea; WR	Recruit ratings: Scout: Rivals: (N/A)				
Jamauri Bogan; RB	Union Township, NJ	Union HS	5 ft 8 in (1.73 m)	164 lb (74 kg)	Jun 28, 2013
Jamauri Bogan; RB	Recruit ratings: Scout: Rivals: (73)				
Nathan Braster; DE	Fort Wayne, IN	South Side HS	6 ft 5 in (1.96 m)	240 lb (110 kg)	Jul 23, 2013
Nathan Braster; DE	Recruit ratings: Scout: Rivals: (N/A)				
Asantay Brown; ATH	Muskegon, MI	Mona Shores HS	6 ft 1 in (1.85 m)	190 lb (86 kg)	Feb 12, 2013
Asantay Brown; ATH	Recruit ratings: Scout: Rivals: (73)				
Deontae Brown; DB	Chicago, IL	Mount Carmel HS	6 ft 2 in (1.88 m)	198 lb (90 kg)	Apr 20, 2013
Deontae Brown; DB	Recruit ratings: Scout: Rivals: (69)				
Curtis Doyle; OL	Alma, MI	Alma HS	6 ft 5 in (1.96 m)	287 lb (130 kg)	Apr 25, 2013
Curtis Doyle; OL	Recruit ratings: Scout: Rivals: (73)				
Leo Ekwoge; RB	Olney, MD	Good Counsel HS	5 ft 11 in (1.80 m)	200 lb (91 kg)	Jul 25, 2013
Leo Ekwoge; RB	Recruit ratings: Scout: Rivals: (73)				
Jacari Faulkner; DE	Detroit, MI	U of D Jesuit HS	6 ft 2 in (1.88 m)	230 lb (100 kg)	May 6, 2013
Jacari Faulkner; DE	Recruit ratings: Scout: Rivals:				
Kenny Finley; DT	Muskegon, MI	Muskegon HS	6 ft 3 in (1.91 m)	279 lb (127 kg)	Jan 5, 2013
Kenny Finley; DT	Recruit ratings: Scout: Rivals: (76)				
Jarvion Franklin; RB	Tinley Park, IL	Andrew HS	6 ft 1 in (1.85 m)	219 lb (99 kg)	Jul 25, 2013
Jarvion Franklin; RB	Recruit ratings: Scout: Rivals: (N/A)				
Jay Harris; WR	Exton, PA	Downingtown East HS	5 ft 11 in (1.80 m)	170 lb (77 kg)	Nov 14, 2013
Jay Harris; WR	Recruit ratings: Scout: Rivals: (77)				
JaKevin Jackson; LB	Milledgeville, GA	Georgia Military College	6 ft 3 in (1.91 m)	226 lb (103 kg)	Nov 17, 2013
JaKevin Jackson; LB	Recruit ratings: Scout: Rivals: (N/A)				
Lonnie Johnson; ATH	Gary, IN	West Side HS	6 ft 3 in (1.91 m)	180 lb (82 kg)	Nov 19, 2013
Lonnie Johnson; ATH	Recruit ratings: Scout: Rivals: (81)				
Elliot Jordan; OL	Kentwood, MI	East Kentwood HS	6 ft 7 in (2.01 m)	255 lb (116 kg)	Nov 6, 2013
Elliot Jordan; OL	Recruit ratings: Scout: Rivals: (73)				
Nick Matich; DT	Clarkston, MI	Clarkston HS	6 ft 2 in (1.88 m)	283 lb (128 kg)	Jun 29, 2013
Nick Matich; DT	Recruit ratings: Scout: Rivals: (N/A)				
Chris McDaniel; ATH	Detroit, MI	Cass Tech HS	6 ft 4 in (1.93 m)	233 lb (106 kg)	Apr 11, 2013
Chris McDaniel; ATH	Recruit ratings: Scout: Rivals: (N/A)				
Zach Novoselsky; OL	Lincolnshire, IL	Stevenson HS	6 ft 6 in (1.98 m)	273 lb (124 kg)	Jul 19, 2013
Zach Novoselsky; OL	Recruit ratings: Scout: Rivals: (72)				
Chukwuma Okorafor; OL	Southfield, MI	Southfield HS	6 ft 6 in (1.98 m)	280 lb (130 kg)	May 4, 2013
Chukwuma Okorafor; OL	Recruit ratings: Scout: Rivals: (74)				
Wyatt Pfeifer; OL	Delaware, OH	Buckeye Valley HS	6 ft 3 in (1.91 m)	245 lb (111 kg)	Jul 25, 2013
Wyatt Pfeifer; OL	Recruit ratings: Scout: Rivals: (N/A)				
Delshawn Phillips; LB	Detroit, MI	Cass Tech HS	6 ft 2 in (1.88 m)	225 lb (102 kg)	Apr 11, 2013
Delshawn Phillips; LB	Recruit ratings: Scout: Rivals: (N/A)				
Javonte Seabury; ATH	Orlando, FL	Timber Creek HS	5 ft 9 in (1.75 m)	153 lb (69 kg)	Jan 2, 2014
Javonte Seabury; ATH	Recruit ratings: Scout: Rivals: (74)				
Alon Sims; ATH	Royal Palm Beach, FL	Royal Palm Beach HS	6 ft 2 in (1.88 m)	177 lb (80 kg)	May 2, 2014
Alon Sims; ATH	Recruit ratings: Scout: Rivals: (N/A)				
Robert Spillane; ATH	Oak Park, IL	Fenwick HS	6 ft 2 in (1.88 m)	217 lb (98 kg)	Mar 23, 2013
Robert Spillane; ATH	Recruit ratings: Scout: Rivals: (75)				
Chance Stewart; QB	Sturgis, MI	Sturgis HS	6 ft 6 in (1.98 m)	207 lb (94 kg)	Apr 18, 2013
Chance Stewart; QB	Recruit ratings: Scout: Rivals: (80)				
Antione Stone; ATH	Bedford, OH	Bedford HS	5 ft 10 in (1.78 m)	180 lb (82 kg)	Jun 19, 2013
Antione Stone; ATH	Recruit ratings: Scout: Rivals: (N/A)				
Jason Sylva; LB	Franklin, MA	Dean JC	6 ft 3 in (1.91 m)	250 lb (110 kg)	Dec 16, 2013
Jason Sylva; LB	Recruit ratings: Scout: Rivals: (N/A)				
Jordan Van Dort; OL	Zeeland, MI	Zeeland West HS	6 ft 5 in (1.96 m)	283 lb (128 kg)	Oct 4, 2013
Jordan Van Dort; OL	Recruit ratings: Scout: Rivals: (77)				
Overall recruit ranking: Scout: 56 Rivals: 58
‡ Refers to 40-yard dash; Note: In many cases, Scout, Rivals, 247Sports, On3, and ESPN may conflict in their listings of height, weight and 40 time.; In these cases, the average was taken. ESPN grades are on a 100-point scale.; Sources: "Western Michigan Football Commitment List". Rivals.; "Western Michigan Football Commitment List". Scout.; "Western Michigan Football Commitment List". ESPN.; "Scout.com Team Recruiting Rankings". Scout.; "2014 Team Ranking". Rivals.com.

== Schedule ==
Date	Time	Opponent	Site	TV	Result	Attendance
August 30	Noon	at Purdue*	Ross–Ade Stadium; West Lafayette, IN	ESPNU	L 34–43	37,031
September 13	5:00 pm	at Idaho*	Kibbie Dome; Moscow, ID	ESPN3	W 45–33	14,721
September 20	7:00 pm	Murray State*	Waldo Stadium; Kalamazoo, MI	ESPN3	W 45–14	22,226
September 27	12:30 pm	at Virginia Tech*	Lane Stadium; Blacksburg, VA	ESPN3	L 17–35	59,625
October 4	7:00 pm	Toledo	Waldo Stadium; Kalamazoo, MI	ESPN3	L 19–20 ^{OT}	11,493
October 11	3:00 pm	at Ball State	Scheumann Stadium; Muncie, IN	ESPN3	W 42–38	11,237
October 18	2:00 pm	at Bowling Green	Doyt Perry Stadium; Bowling Green, OH	BCSN	W 26–14	15,201
October 25	2:00 pm	Ohio^{†}	Waldo Stadium; Kalamazoo, MI	ESPN3	W 42–21	20,225
November 1	2:30 pm	at Miami (OH)	Yager Stadium; Oxford, OH	ESPN3	W 41–10	9,045
November 15	2:00 pm	Eastern Michigan	Waldo Stadium; Kalamazoo, MI (Michigan MAC Trophy)	ESPN3	W 51–7	12,985
November 22	1:00 pm	at Central Michigan	Kelly/Shorts Stadium; Mount Pleasant, MI (Victory Cannon, Michigan MAC Trophy)	ESPN3	W 32–20	17,265
November 28	11:00 am	Northern Illinois	Waldo Stadium; Kalamazoo, MI	ESPNU	L 21–31	11,195
December 20	5:45 pm	vs. Air Force*	Albertsons Stadium; Boise, ID (Famous Idaho Potato Bowl)	ESPN	L 24–38	18,223
*Non-conference game; ^{†}Homecoming; All times are in Eastern time

Schedule source:

== Coaching staff ==
Name	Position	Year at WMU	Alma mater
P. J. Fleck	Head coach	2nd	Northern Illinois (2004)
Kirk Ciarrocca	Offensive coordinator	2nd	Temple (1990)
Ed Pinkham	Defensive coordinator, Defensive backs	2nd	Allegheny (1975)
Mike Hart	Running backs	1st	Michigan (2008)
Bill Kenney	Tight ends	2nd	Norwich (1982)
Tim McGarigle	Linebackers	3rd	Northwestern (2006)
Vinson Reynolds	Defensive line	2nd	Northern Illinois (2004)
Matt Simon	Wide receivers	1st	Northern Illinois (2004)
Rob Wenger	Special teams	2nd	Colgate (2008)
Brian Callahan	Offensive line	2nd	Eastern Illinois (1992)
