= P. J. Fleck =

American football player and coach (born 1980)

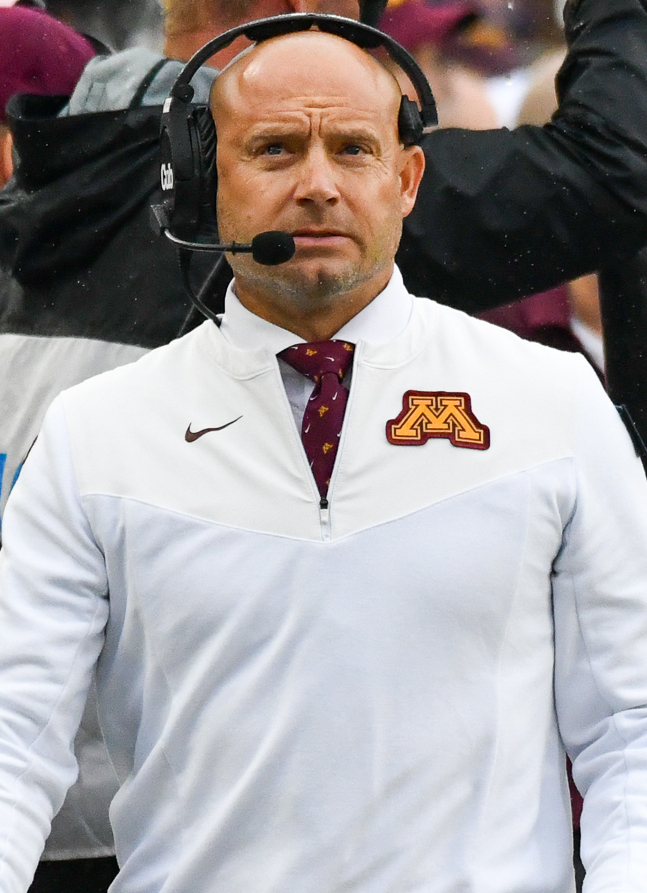
- Fleck in 2024

Current position
- Title: Head coach
- Team: Minnesota
- Conference: Big Ten
- Record: 72–49
- Annual salary: $6 million

Biographical details
- Born: November 29, 1980 (age 45); Sugar Grove, Illinois, U.S.

Playing career
- 1999–2003: Northern Illinois
- 2004–2005: San Francisco 49ers
- Position: Wide receiver

Coaching career (HC unless noted)
- 2006: Ohio State (GA)
- 2007–2008: Northern Illinois (WR)
- 2009: Northern Illinois (WR/RC)
- 2010–2011: Rutgers (WR)
- 2012: Tampa Bay Buccaneers (WR)
- 2013–2016: Western Michigan
- 2017–present: Minnesota

Head coaching record
- Overall: 102–68
- Bowls: 8–2

Accomplishments and honors

Championships
- 1 MAC (2016); 2 MAC West Division (2015–2016); 1 Big Ten West Division (2019) (Note: The 2019 Big Ten West division title was shared with Wisconsin. However, based on their head-to-head record, Wisconsin played in the Big Ten championship game.)

Awards
- First-team All-MAC (2003); 2× MAC Coach of the Year (2014, 2016); Big Ten Coach of the Year (2019)

Philip John Fleck Jr. (born November 29, 1980) is an American football coach and former player. He has served as the head coach at the University of Minnesota, Twin Cities since 2017.

Born in Sugar Grove, Illinois, Fleck played college football as a wide receiver for the Northern Illinois Huskies. He was signed as an undrafted free agent by the San Francisco 49ers in 2004, spending a majority of his short career in the National Football League (NFL) on the practice squad. Since then, he has pursued a coaching career.

He has formerly been the wide receivers coach for Northern Illinois (2007–2009), Rutgers (2010–2011), and the Tampa Bay Buccaneers (2012). Fleck was also previously the head coach of the Western Michigan Broncos football team from 2013 until 2016. In 2019, two years following his hiring by Minnesota, Fleck led the Golden Gophers to one of their best seasons in half a century, earning their most wins since 1904.

== Playing career ==
=== Prep ===
Fleck started his playing career at Kaneland High School located in Maple Park, Illinois, where he helped the Knights win back to back, undefeated state championships in 1997 and 1998. He set a state record with 95 catches for 1,548 yards and 16 touchdowns as a senior. For his career, Fleck caught 199 passes for 3,121 yards and 34 scores with at least one catch in 40 straight games. Fleck also lettered in varsity track and basketball.

=== College ===
Upon graduation, Fleck attended Northern Illinois University where he played wide receiver with the guidance of head coach Joe Novak. As a senior, he led the Huskies with 77 catches for 1,028 yards and six touchdowns, a reception total that still ranks second on the school's single-season list. Fleck still owns the school record for career punt returns (87), is second in punt return yards (716), ranks third in career catches (179) and is fourth in receiving yards (2,162). He was a second team Academic All-American as a senior and was twice voted team captain by his Huskie teammates.

=== Pro ===
Fleck was signed as an undrafted free agent by the San Francisco 49ers following the 2004 NFL draft. 49ers head coach Dennis Erickson labeled Fleck a "frickin' warrior" during the first days of rookie training camp. Fleck spent a majority of the 2004 season on the 49ers practice squad before being promoted to the 53 man roster and appearing in the 49ers final game of the season. Playing special teams, he registered a tackle and returned one punt for ten yards. Fleck spent the 2005 season on injured reserve after suffering a significant shoulder injury during the preseason. On June 12, 2006, Fleck was released by the 49ers. The day he was released, 49ers head coach Mike Nolan offered Fleck a spot on his coaching staff as assistant wide receivers coach, stating "If that's something he wants to do, I think he'd be very good at it."

Fleck attempted to continue his playing career after his release from the 49ers, and had a tryout with his hometown Chicago Bears on June 20. However, he failed his physical due to his previous injuries and was unable to sign. Fleck stated that after the failed physical, he knew it was time to begin a career in coaching.

== Assistant coaching career ==
Fleck began his coaching career in 2006 as an offensive graduate assistant at Ohio State University at the invitation of head coach Jim Tressel. He worked directly with the Buckeyes tight ends and assisted with the special teams. Northern Illinois running backs coach Thomas Hammock and defensive ends coach Mike Sabock, a lifelong friend and collegiate teammate of Tressel, helped Fleck land the Ohio State job. Fleck spent one year with the Buckeyes, who were ranked No. 1 in the country most of the season. The team earned the 2006 Big Ten Championship and appeared in the 2007 BCS National Championship Game, where they lost to Florida and finished the season ranked No. 2 in the nation.

In 2007, Fleck was hired by Northern Illinois head coach Joe Novak as wide receivers coach, replacing Carnelius Cruz. Novak had stated several years prior that he hoped to one day hire Fleck as a coach. Following Novak's retirement in 2008, Fleck was one of two NIU assistants to be retained by incoming head coach Jerry Kill, and also added the title of recruiting coordinator.

In 2010, Fleck was hired by Rutgers University as the wide receivers coach under head coach Greg Schiano.

On February 2, 2012, he was hired as the offensive coordinator at Northern Illinois University. Coach Dave Doeren said the following about Fleck's hiring, "We spoke at length about why this is the right place for him. It was very evident to me that he bleeds NIU, and he would have tremendous pride and passion working not just for me, but for the university to help continue what we started last year, and really what he started here as a player. His recruiting abilities and passing game expertise, working alongside Coach Carey as our run game coordinator, will be a great combination for our offense." Just one day later, on February 3, 2012, Fleck abruptly resigned the Northern Illinois position to accept a position as wide receivers coach with the Tampa Bay Buccaneers of the NFL. The move reunited him with Schiano, who had recently left Rutgers for the Buccaneers head coaching job.

During his time with the Buccaneers, Fleck was known to wear cleats during practice, often running routes and simulating defenses with the receivers.

== Head coaching career ==
=== Western Michigan ===
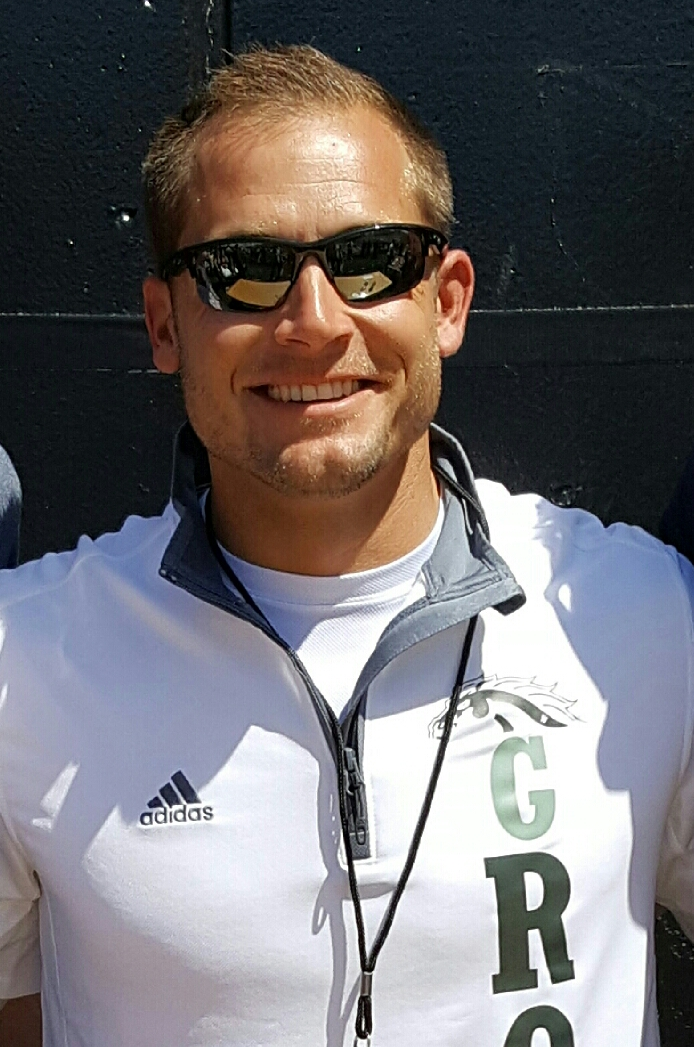
Fleck at the 2016 Western Michigan spring football game.

On December 17, 2012, Western Michigan University announced the hiring of Fleck as the new head coach, making him the youngest head coach and the first head coach in the Football Bowl Subdivision (FBS) of college football to have been born in the 1980s. Fleck signed a five-year contract worth $392,000 per season that includes an assistant coaches salary pool of $825,000. The previous head coach, Bill Cubit, earned $375,000 per year with an assistants salary pool of $723,000. With the increased budget, Fleck hired a dedicated recruiting coordinator – a first for the WMU football program. Other candidates expressing interest in the job included Syracuse defensive coordinator (and later head coach) Scott Shafer, and Kent State offensive coordinator Brian Rock, both former WMU assistants. WMU had also been in contact with Indiana State head coach Trent Miles, North Dakota State head coach Craig Bohl, and Illinois State head coach Brock Spack, all of whom declined interest or withdrew from consideration

One of Fleck's first actions as head coach was to rescind scholarship offers to incoming players who had verbally committed to Western Michigan. The withdrawals occurred just weeks before the national signing day, and left players unable to arrange other Division I scholarships as slots were already filled at other schools. "I know if it was me, I would be ticked," Fleck said of the players who had scholarship offers pulled. "I also know if it was me, I would have showed up in the office of the head football coach, telling him I was dying to still be here."

Fleck made sports headlines after his hire with his charisma and attempts to energize to the WMU program, including dancing (The Harlem Shake), posting YouTube videos, adding an in-stadium DJ for games, and establishing a program-wide mantra of "rowing the boat". Fleck participated in a polar bear plunge held at Goldsworth Pond on the Western Michigan campus. The event raised funds for the Michigan Special Olympics, and led Holly Anderson of Sports Illustrated to proclaim Fleck as "the best new hire" for 2013, if only for generating interest in the program.

==== 2013 season ====
Fleck's first season as Broncos head coach resulted in a final record of 1–11 (1–7 Mid-American Conference (MAC)). It was the program's worst season since 2004, when the Broncos went 1–10 (0–7 MAC). Injuries, youth and inexperience, discipline, and execution led to poor play. Low-lights included a home loss to Nicholls State, a blowout loss to Iowa, and a homecoming loss to Buffalo. The team improved their play late in the season, with a road win against UMass, and close home losses to in-state rivals Eastern Michigan and Central Michigan.

Despite the on-field difficulties in 2013, Fleck and his staff succeeded off the field by signing a highly ranked recruiting class. Observers noted that it was possibly the best recruiting class in WMU history, and the best in the MAC since 2000. Rivals.com had the WMU class ranked highest among "mid-major" programs for 2014, with 247Sports ranking the class 36th-best nationally for 2015.

==== 2014 season ====
By 2015, Fleck was one of seven FBS head coaches with NFL playing experience: Jim Harbaugh, Steve Spurrier, Jeff Brohm, Joey Jones, Kliff Kingsbury, and Kyle Whittingham.

On November 20, 2014, Fleck was among 20 semi-finalists for the Maxwell Coach of the Year award.

After finishing the 2014 regular season with an 8–4 record, Fleck was named the 2014 MAC Coach of the Year. The seven game improvement in wins from the previous season was the best in WMU history. WMU rewarded Fleck by extending his contract through the 2020 season. In addition to his base salary of $392,500, Fleck earned an additional $61,000 in bonuses by hitting contract incentives ($25,000 for a bowl game appearance, $15,000 for MAC Coach of the Year, $12,000 for eight wins, and $9,000 for player all-conference honors). Fleck's new contract paid him $800,000 per year, plus incentives, making Fleck the MAC's highest-paid coach, nearly 45 percent higher than second place Frank Solich ($554,500).

WMU lost 38–24 in the 2014 Famous Idaho Potato Bowl against the Air Force Falcons of the Mountain West Conference.

==== 2015 season ====
Fleck and WMU had the highest-rated recruiting class in the MAC for the third consecutive year.

To open the season, WMU lost to No. 5 Michigan State 37–24 at home in Waldo Stadium. The matchup marked the first time that WMU had hosted a Big Ten Conference opponent since 2007 (Indiana) The following week, they lost to Georgia Southern 43–17. In Week 3 they beat Murray State at home 52–20, and to finish off their non-conference schedule, they lost at No. 1 Ohio State in Week 4 by a score of 38–12.

In Week 6, Western retained the Victory Cannon by defeating rival Central Michigan by a score of 41–39. In week 8, Western retained the Michigan MAC Trophy by defeating Eastern Michigan by a score of 58–28.

On November 27, 2015, the Broncos beat No. 24-ranked Toledo 35–30 on the road at the Glass Bowl for the program's first ever win over a ranked opponent. Western was previously 0–32 against top-25 teams.

WMU finished the 2015 regular season with a record of 7–5 (6–2 MAC). 7 of the 12 opponents ultimately appeared in a bowl game. The 7–5 record earned WMU a bowl berth for the second straight year – the first time in program history that the team made bowl appearances in consecutive seasons. On December 24, 2015, the Broncos defeated the Middle Tennessee Blue Raiders in the Bahamas Bowl by a score of 45–31. The bowl win was the first in program history, as WMU was previously 0–6 in postseason bowl games.

==== 2016 season ====
Fleck and WMU had the highest-rated recruiting class in the MAC for the fourth consecutive year.

To open the season WMU beat Northwestern 22–21 in a road game at Ryan Field. The following week they beat North Carolina Central 70–21 in Kalamazoo. In week three WMU beat Illinois 34–10 on the road at Memorial Stadium. This was the first time in program history to beat two Big Ten teams in the same season.

In week 4 WMU avenged a loss to Georgia Southern from last season, winning 49–31. In week five, Western retained the Victory Cannon by defeating rival Central Michigan by a score of 49–10. This marked Western Michigan's third consecutive win in the series and 5 of the last 6. Following this game WMU was ranked 25 in the coaches poll - the first time WMU appeared in the top 25 of a major poll. In the sixth week, WMU improved to 6–0 with a win against his alma mater Northern Illinois. Following the win, WMU was ranked No. 24 in the AP Top 25 poll, the first time in Western's history that they've received a place in the top 25 of both major polls.

WMU was able to complete their undefeated regular season at 12–0 with a win at home against Toledo, 55–35 on Friday, November 25. It was the first undefeated regular season for WMU since 1941, when the team went 8–0. Fleck was named MAC Coach of the Year following the season.

On December 2, 2016, WMU defeated Ohio in the 20th MAC Football Championship Game at Ford Field in Detroit. It was the first conference championship for WMU since 1988, as well as the first 10-win season in WMU's 111-year football history. WMU completed the 2016 regular season ranked No. 12 in the AP poll, #14 in the coaches poll, and #15 in the College Football Playoff rankings.

As the highest-ranked team in the "Group of Five," Fleck's Broncos were invited to the 2017 Cotton Bowl Classic, easily the most prestigious bowl in Western Michigan's football history. They lost to Wisconsin by a final score of 24–16.

On December 6, 2016, Fleck was announced as one of five finalists for the Eddie Robinson Coach of the Year award alongside Colorado's Mike MacIntyre, Washington's Chris Petersen, Alabama's Nick Saban and Penn State's James Franklin.

=== Minnesota ===
==== 2017 season ====
Following Tracy Claeys' firing, Fleck accepted the head football coaching job at the University of Minnesota on January 6, 2017. After initially signing a five-year $18 million contract in January 2017 when he was first hired, Fleck agreed to a one-year extension on November 21, 2017, that would extend his contract through the 2022 season. The deal would be an annual salary starting at $3.5 million/year and increase by $50,000 each year and will last until January 31, 2023. His team won its first game against Buffalo (17–7), then Oregon State (48–14), and Middle Tennessee State (34–3) to start the season 3–0 but sputtered down the stretch and lost 31–0 to No. 5 Wisconsin making Minnesota 5–7 and ineligible for the postseason.

==== 2018 season ====
In Fleck's second season as head coach, the Golden Gophers again started with three non-conference wins against New Mexico State (48–10), #21-ranked Fresno State (21–14), and Miami (OH) (26–3). Big Ten play challenged the team once again, however, as they lost four games straight before a victory over Indiana (38–31). After the following week's blowout loss at Illinois (55–31), the latest of several poor defensive performances in conference play, Fleck replaced coordinator Robb Smith with defensive line coach Joe Rossi. The defense improved dramatically, and the team won two of its last three regular season games against strong opponents, defeating Purdue (41–10), losing to No. 22 Northwestern (24–14) and winning against Wisconsin (37–15). The Gophers' victory over the Badgers returned Paul Bunyan's Axe to Minneapolis for the first time since 2003, and earned the program its second trip to the Quick Lane Bowl in Detroit. In Minnesota's first appearance in a bowl game under Fleck, the Gophers defeated the Georgia Tech Yellow Jackets 34–10 to finish the season 7–6.

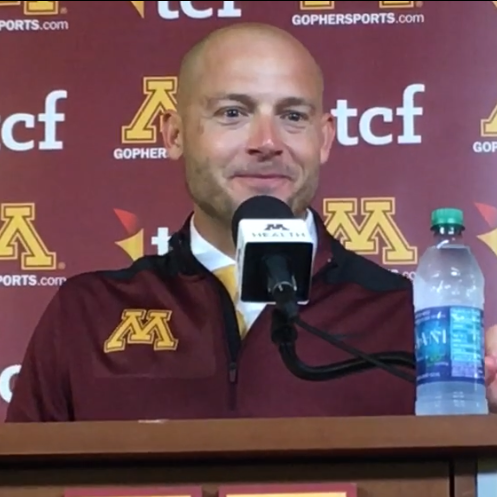
Fleck in 2019.

==== 2019 season ====
In his third season, Fleck led the Golden Gophers to one of their best seasons in over half a century. They raced out to a 9–0 start, their best start since 1904. By beating #4-ranked Penn State, the Golden Gophers beat a top-five opponent at home for the first time since 1977. In November, Fleck signed a seven-year $33.25 million contract. Although the Golden Gophers saw setbacks with losses against the Iowa Hawkeyes and Wisconsin Badgers, Fleck won the coaches vote Big Ten Coach of the Year, sharing the award with the media voting for Ohio State's Ryan Day. The Gophers went on to finish the regular season 10–2, their first season with double-digit wins since 1904. By comparison, the two coaches who led the Gophers to national championships, Hall of Famers Bernie Bierman and Murray Warmath, never won more than eight games in a season. They also tied for the Big Ten West title, though behind rival Wisconsin, the first time they had won a share of a division title since the Big Ten began divisional play. They defeated Auburn in the 2020 Outback Bowl for their 11th win, their most since 1904. The Gophers ended the year ranked 10th in the nation in both the AP and Coaches College Football polls, their highest year-end ranking since 1962.

==== 2020 season ====
In Fleck's fourth season at Minnesota, the Golden Gophers concluded an abbreviated season with a 3–4 record.

Due to the COVID-19 pandemic, the Big Ten Conference first made the decision in July to eliminate non-conference games for all fall athletics, limiting member teams to conference-only schedules. The Big Ten then released new conference-only fall football schedules on August 5, before announcing six days later that the fall 2020 football season had been "postponed" due to "ongoing health and safety concerns related to the COVID-19 pandemic." The conference reversed course on September 16, announcing a nine-game football season with a start date of October 24 and citing the availability of daily antigen testing, enhanced cardiac screenings, and an enhanced data-driven approach to making decisions about practice and/or competition. Minnesota wide receiver Rashod Bateman, who had initially opted out of the 2020 season in August due to "uncertainty around health and safety," petitioned the NCAA for a waiver to restore his eligibility and allow him to return to the team for the fall season. The NCAA approved his waiver on September 30.

The Golden Gophers opened the season with a 49–24 loss to then #18-ranked Michigan, and dropped to 0-2 the following week after a 45–44 overtime loss to Maryland. Minnesota notched their first win of the season in a 41-14 road victory over Illinois before hosting Iowa in a 35–7 loss to the Hawkeyes. In a Week 5 matchup against Purdue, the Gophers were forced to compete with a total of 22 players unavailable due to a combination of positive COVID-19 tests, contact tracing, opt-outs, and injuries. Minnesota prevailed 34–31 over the Boilermakers but saw their next two games against Wisconsin and Northwestern cancelled due to an abundance of positive COVID-19 cases within the program. Bateman elected to opt out of the rest of the season, declaring for the NFL Draft. The Gophers were able to return to action against Nebraska and beat the Huskers, 24–17, despite 33 of their players being unavailable. To end the season, the Big Ten arranged for Minnesota and Wisconsin to play, marking the 130th meeting between the border rivals and allowing the longest-running series in FBS history to continue uninterrupted. The Badgers prevailed in overtime, 20–17, to retain Paul Bunyan's Axe. The Gophers finished 4th in the Big Ten West with a 3–4 record.

==== 2021 season ====
In his fifth season, Fleck led the Golden Gophers to the program's fourth nine-win season since 1905, finishing 9–4 overall with a 6–3 record in Big Ten play. It is the seventh time in program history the Gophers won six or more conference games in a season.

Minnesota opened the season with a 45–31 loss to #4-ranked Ohio State. Mohamed Ibrahim, the reigning Big Ten Running Back of the Year, was sidelined for the rest of the year after suffering a torn Achilles tendon in the season opener. After back-to-back wins over Miami (Ohio) and Colorado, the Gophers dropped a 14–10 loss at home to Bowling Green, who entered the game as 30.5-point underdogs. The loss also snapped Minnesota's streak of 21 straight non-conference wins. The Gophers bounced back to win four straight Big Ten games before suffering losses to Illinois and #20-ranked Iowa. Minnesota beat Indiana on the road the following week before hosting #14-ranked Wisconsin in the regular season finale. The Gophers upset the Badgers, 23–13, to re-claim Paul Bunyan's Axe and deny Wisconsin a trip to the Big Ten Championship Game, opening the door for Iowa to claim the Big Ten West division title outright.

Minnesota defeated West Virginia, 18–6, in the Guaranteed Rate Bowl for their ninth win of the season.

==== 2022 season ====
In Fleck's sixth season at Minnesota, the Golden Gophers finished the season with a 9–4 record, marking the program's third nine-win season in four years.

Minnesota opened the season 3–0 with wins over New Mexico State, Western Illinois, and Colorado, before traveling to East Lansing to face Michigan State. After defeating the Spartans, 34–7, the Gophers were ranked #21 in the AP Top 25 before suffering their first setback of the season in a 20–10 loss at home to Purdue. The loss to the Boilermakers was the start of a three-game skid for Minnesota, followed by road losses to #24 Illinois and #16 Penn State. The Gophers bounced back with a 31–0 win over Rutgers but the following week found themselves trailing Nebraska, 10–0, at halftime. Redshirt freshman Athan Kaliakmanis took over at quarterback in the second half and rallied the Gophers to a 20–13 comeback win over the Cornhuskers. Kaliakmanis started the final three games of the regular season, a stretch that included wins over Northwestern and Wisconsin and a 13–10 loss to Iowa. Minnesota's win over the Badgers marked their first back-to-back wins over their border rival since 1993–94.

The Gophers defeated Syracuse, 28–20, in the Pinstripe Bowl for their ninth win of the season.

==== 2023 season ====
In Fleck's seventh season at Minnesota, the Golden Gophers finished the season with a 6–7 record.

The Gophers opened the season with a 13–10 win at home over Nebraska, rallying from a 10–3 deficit in the final minutes to win on a 47-yard field goal as time expired. After improving to 2–0 with a non-conference win over Eastern Michigan, Minnesota went on to lose three of their next four games, including a 37–34 overtime loss to Northwestern in which the Gophers led 31-10 going into the fourth quarter.

Coming out of their bye week, Minnesota upset #24 Iowa on the road. The 12–10 win snapped a streak of eight straight losses to the Hawkeyes and marked the Gophers' first win at Kinnick Stadium since 1999. Minnesota defeated Michigan State at home the following week, before dropping all four of their final games to end the regular season.

Though Minnesota's record was below .500 at the conclusion of the regular season, there were not enough bowl-eligible teams to match the number of bowl slots, resulting in the Gophers being extended a bowl invite due to the program's Academic Progress Rate (APR). Minnesota went on to defeat Bowling Green, 30–24, in the Quick Lane Bowl.

==== 2024 season ====
In Fleck's eighth season at Minnesota, the Golden Gophers finished the season with a 8–5 record.

Minnesota debuted the season with starting quarterback Max Brosmer, a FCS transfer from New Hampshire. They started out the season with a loss to North Carolina, on a last second missed field goal. Then had two wins over non-power 4 conference teams, Rhode Island and Nevada. The Golden Gophers started Big Ten Play with two losses to Iowa and Michigan. While Minnesota lost to Iowa by 17 points, the Michigan game ended with an onside kick that was recovered by the Gophers but called back for an offsides call, which led to Minnesota starting the season 2–3. Minnesota then went on to win its next four games, including against USC who was ranked 11th at the time and Illinois who finished the season ranked 17th. After the winning streak, they lost two close games to Rutgers and Penn State. Ending the season by beating Wisconsin, Fleck snapped the Badgers' 22 season bowl streak, as Wisconsin finished 5–7.

The Gophers defeated Virginia Tech in the Duke's Mayo Bowl, reaching their 8th win.

== Personal life ==
Fleck is a 2004 graduate of Northern Illinois University with a bachelor's degree in elementary education. He has five children: stepson Gavin Jackson, sons Carter Joseph (C. J.) and Colt, and daughters Paisley Jane (P.J.) and Harper. Colt died shortly after birth due to a heart condition. Paisley was born on December 17, 2012, the same day Fleck was announced as the new coach at Western Michigan University.

Fleck has been married twice. He married his second wife, Heather Jackson, on February 11, 2016. Fleck is an avid runner, and completed his first marathon in April 2009.

In 2014, Fleck was inducted into the Hall of Fame of Kaneland High School, his alma mater, in Maple Park, Illinois.

Fleck credits Jim Tressel, Greg Schiano, and Jerry Kill (among others) with helping advance his coaching career.

Unlike many coaches of his generation, Fleck wears a dress shirt, slacks and a tie in school colors on the sidelines. According to Fleck, this is a tribute to his coaching mentor Jim Tressel and Mike Nolan, Fleck's head coach when he played for the San Francisco 49ers, as both coaches were known for wearing ties while on the sidelines. He maintains an intense, vocal demeanor during games, but is also known to celebrate a win with his players by crowdsurfing through the locker room.

=== "Row the Boat" ===
Fleck devised the "Row the Boat" mantra as part of his grieving process after Colt's death, and extended it to his coaching style. After he left Western Michigan for Minnesota, Fleck and WMU were in a brief dispute over the intellectual property rights to the phrase, but they soon came to a settlement without resorting to the courtroom. Fleck received full rights to the phrase, and can use it freely at Minnesota (and presumably possible future coaching stops). As part of the settlement, Fleck is providing $10,000 annually to endow a football scholarship at WMU, and WMU will have rights to use the phrase for any memorabilia connected to Fleck's tenure with the Broncos. Whenever his teams take the field, one of his players carries an oar.

Fleck and UNRL apparel company collaborated to release a "Row the Boat" clothing line, with 14% the of proceeds benefitting University of Minnesota Masonic Children's Hospital and Ronald McDonald House Charities.

== Head coaching record ==
Year	Team	Overall	Conference	Standing	Bowl/playoffs	Coaches^{#}	AP^{°}
Western Michigan Broncos (Mid-American Conference) (2013–2016)
2013	Western Michigan	1–11	1–7	T–5th (West)			
2014	Western Michigan	8–5	6–2	3rd (West)	L Famous Idaho Potato		
2015	Western Michigan	8–5	6–2	T–1st (West)	W Bahamas		
2016	Western Michigan	13–1	8–0	1st (West)	L Cotton^{†}	18	15
Western Michigan:		30–22	21–11				
Minnesota Golden Gophers (Big Ten Conference) (2017–present)
2017	Minnesota	5–7	2–7	6th (West)			
2018	Minnesota	7–6	3–6	T–5th (West)	W Quick Lane		
2019	Minnesota	11–2	7–2	T–1st (West)	W Outback	10	10
2020	Minnesota	3–4	3–4	4th (West)			
2021	Minnesota	9–4	6–3	T–2nd (West)	W Guaranteed Rate		
2022	Minnesota	9–4	5–4	T–2nd (West)	W Pinstripe		
2023	Minnesota	6–7	3–6	T–4th (West)	W Quick Lane		
2024	Minnesota	8–5	5–4	T–7th	W Duke's Mayo		
2025	Minnesota	8–5	5–4	T–7th	W Rate		
2026	Minnesota	6–5	4–4				
Minnesota:		72–49	43–44				
Total:		102–68					
National championship Conference title Conference division title or championship game berth
^{†}Indicates CFP / New Years' Six bowl.; ^{#}Rankings from final Coaches Poll.; ^{°}Rankings from final AP Poll.
