= 2014 Famous Idaho Potato Bowl =

- 18th Famous Idaho Potato Bowl
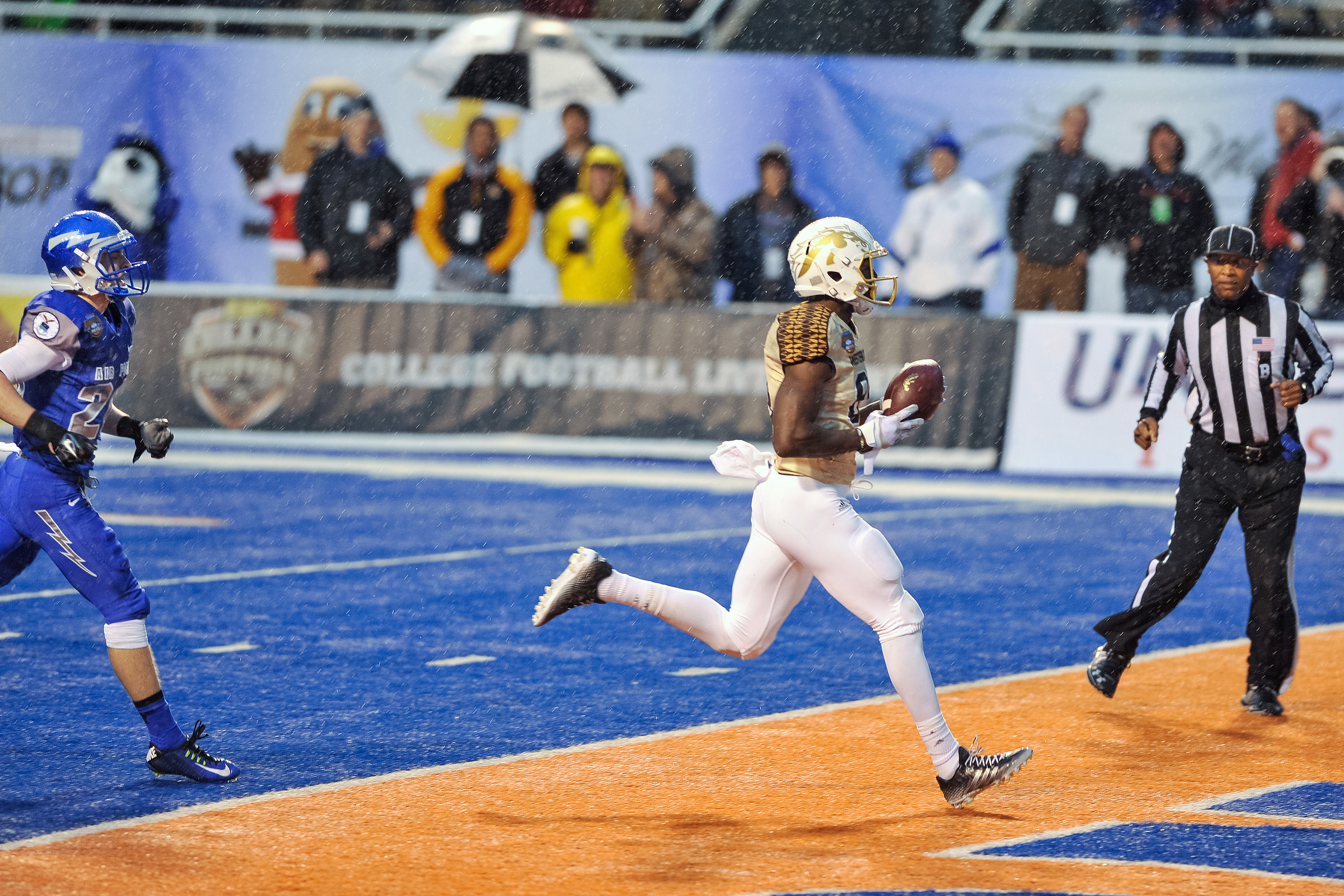
- Corey Davis scores a touchdown during the Famous Idaho Potato Bowl
Western Michigan Broncos	Air Force Falcons
(8–4)	(9–3)
MAC	Mountain West
24	38
Head coach: P. J. Fleck	Head coach: Troy Calhoun
	1	2	3	4	Total
Western Michigan	3	7	0	14	24
Air Force	6	14	3	15	38
- Date: December 20, 2014
- Season: 2014
- Stadium: Albertsons Stadium
- Location: Boise, Idaho
- MVP: Air Force RB Shayne Davern; Western Michigan WR Corey Davis
- Favorite: Western Michigan by 2
- National anthem: Jen Potcher
- Referee: Mike Roche (American)
- Attendance: 18,223
- Payout: US$325,000

United States TV coverage
- Network: ESPN/ESPN Radio
- Announcers: Eamon McAnaney, Dan Hawkins, & Dawn Davenport (ESPN); Paul Loeffler & Pat Hill (ESPN Radio)

The 2014 Famous Idaho Potato Bowl was a college football bowl game that was played on December 20, 2014, at Albertsons Stadium on the campus of Boise State University in Boise, Idaho. It was one of the 2014–15 bowl games that concluded the 2014 FBS football season. The eighteenth annual Famous Idaho Potato Bowl, it pitted the Western Michigan Broncos of the Mid-American Conference against the Air Force Falcons of the Mountain West Conference. The game started at 3:45 p.m. MST and aired on ESPN. The game was sponsored by the Idaho Potato Commission. Air Force beat Western Michigan by a score of 38–24.

== Teams ==
The game featured the Western Michigan Broncos of the Mid-American Conference against the Air Force Falcons of the Mountain West Conference, and was the first Famous Idaho Potato Bowl for both teams.

This was the first overall meeting between these two teams.

=== Western Michigan Broncos ===
After finishing their regular season with an 8–4 record, the Broncos accepted their invitation to play in the game.

In addition to this being Western Michigan's first Famous Idaho Potato Bowl, it was also their first bowl game since the 2011 Little Caesars Pizza Bowl. The Broncos were seeking their first-ever bowl victory, as they were 0–5 in their prior bowl games.

=== Air Force Falcons ===
After finishing their regular season with a 9–3 record, the Falcons accepted their invitation to play in the game.

== Game summary ==
=== Scoring summary ===
Scoring summary

Quarter	Time	Drive			Team	Scoring information	Score	
Quarter	Time	Plays	Yards	TOP	Team	Scoring information	WMU	AFA
1	12:45	8	22	2:08	WMU	25-yard field goal by Andrew Haldeman	3	0
1	5:24	9	61	2:41	AFA	Shayne Davern 1-yard touchdown run, kick no good	3	6
2	11:26	6	75	2:49	WMU	Corey Davis 47-yard touchdown reception from Zach Terrell, Haldeman kick good	10	6
2	10:12	3	72	1:14	AFA	Davern 55-yard touchdown run, Will Conant kick good	10	13
2	2:32	15	80	5:59	AFA	Devin Rushing 1-yard touchdown run, Conant kick good	10	20
3	6:32	9	35	3:35	AFA	31-yard field goal by Conant	10	23
4	13:26	9	92	2:00	WMU	Davis 35-yard touchdown reception from Terrell, Haldeman kick good	17	23
4	9:52	–	–	–	AFA	Fumble recovery returned 60 yards for touchdown by Dexter Walker, 2-point pass good	17	31
4	5:20	7	38	3:11	AFA	D. J. Johnson 9-yard touchdown run, Conant kick good	17	38
4	3:16	6	84	2:04	WMU	Davis 51-yard touchdown reception from Terrell, Haldeman kick good	24	38
"TOP" = time of possession. For other American football terms, see Glossary of American football.							24	38

=== Statistics ===
Statistic	WMU	Air Force
First downs	17	20
Plays–yards	64–376	74–361
Rushes–yards	26–79	64–284
Passing yards	297	77
Passing: Comp–Att–Int	19–38–0	5–10–0
Time of possession	27:22	32:38
