= Matt Moore (American football coach) =

American football coach

Current position
- Title: Head coach
- Team: Northwestern–St. Paul
- Conference: UMAC
- Record: 46–45

Playing career
- 1995–1998: Northwestern (MN)
- Position: Defensive end

Coaching career (HC unless noted)
- 1999–2000: Northwestern (IA) (assistant)
- 2001–2002: Greenville (DC)
- 2003–2004: Bethel (MN) (assistant)
- 2005–2017: Northwestern (MN) (DC)
- 2017–present: Northwestern (MN)

Head coaching record
- Overall: 46–45
- Tournaments: 0–2 (NCAA D-III playoffs)

Accomplishments and honors

Championships
- 2 UMAC (2022, 2024)

Awards
- 2× UMAC Coach of the Year (2022, 2024)

Matt Moore is an American college football coach and former player. He is the head football coach at the University of Northwestern – St. Paul, a position he has held since 2017. Moore previously served as an assistant coach at Northwestern, including as the program's defensive coordinator. As head coach, he has led Northwestern–St. Paul to Upper Midwest Athletic Conference (UMAC) championships in 2022 and 2024 and two appearances in the NCAA Division III playoffs. He was named UMAC Coach of the Year in both championship seasons.

== Head coaching record ==
Year	Team	Overall	Conference	Standing	Bowl/playoffs
Northwestern Eagles (Upper Midwest Athletic Conference) (2017–present)
2017	Northwestern	6–4	6–3	4th	
2018	Northwestern	5–5	5–3	4th	
2019	Northwestern	4–6	4–4	5th	
2020–21	Northwestern	1–1	1–0		
2021	Northwestern	3–7	2–3	4th	
2022	Northwestern	6–5	6–0	1st	L NCAA Division III First Round
2023	Northwestern	6–4	4–1	2nd	
2024	Northwestern	7–4	7–0	1st	L NCAA Division III First Round
2025	Northwestern	4–6	4–3	2nd	
2026	Northwestern	4–3	4–0		
Northwestern:		46–45	42–17		
Total:		46–45			
National championship Conference title Conference division title or championship game berth
