= Leddie Brown =

American football player (born 1999)

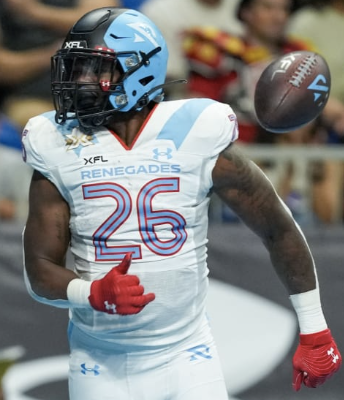
- Brown with the Arlington Renegades in 2023

Profile
- Position: Running back

Personal information
- Born: February 28, 1999 (age 27); Philadelphia, Pennsylvania, U.S.
- Listed height: 6 ft 0 in (1.83 m)
- Listed weight: 215 lb (98 kg)

Career information
- High school: Neumann-Goretti Catholic High (Philadelphia, Pennsylvania); Smyrna (Smyrna, Delaware)
- College: West Virginia (2018–2021)
- NFL draft: 2022: undrafted

Career history
- Los Angeles Chargers (2022)*; St. Louis BattleHawks (2023)*; Arlington Renegades (2023–2024)
- * Offseason or practice squad member only

Awards and highlights
- XFL champion (2023)

Leddie Brown (born February 28, 1999) is an American professional football running back. He played college football at West Virginia.

== Early life ==
Brown attended Smyrna High School in Smyrna, Delaware before transferring to Saints John Neumann and Maria Goretti Catholic High School in Philadelphia, Pennsylvania for his senior year. He had 899 rushing yards and 11 touchdowns his senior year. Brown committed to West Virginia University to play college football.

== College career ==
Brown played in 11 games as a true freshman at West Virginia in 2018, rushing 91 times for 446 yards and four touchdowns. As a sophomore in 2019 he started three of 10 games and rushed for 367 yards on 107 carries and a touchdown. Brown took over as the teams starting running back his junior year in 2020. He finished the season with 1,010 yards on 199 carries with nine touchdowns. He returned to West Virginia for his senior year in 2021 rather than enter the 2021 NFL draft. Brown started his senior season and played in all twelve games amassing 1065 yards and thirteen touchdowns on 223 carries and 217 yards receiving on thirty-six receptions.

== Professional career ==
Pre-draft measurables
Height	Weight	Arm length	Hand span	Wingspan	40-yard dash	10-yard split	20-yard split	20-yard shuttle	Three-cone drill	Vertical jump	Broad jump	Bench press
6 ft 0 1/8 in (1.83 m)	213 lb (97 kg)	31 3/8 in (0.80 m)	9 3/4 in (0.25 m)	6 ft 4 1/4 in (1.94 m)	4.64 s	1.56 s	2.67 s	4.26 s	7.10 s	36.5 in (0.93 m)	9 ft 10 in (3.00 m)	18 reps
All values from NFL Combine

=== Los Angeles Chargers ===
On April 30, 2022, Brown signed with the Los Angeles Chargers as an undrafted free agent. He was waived on August 30, 2022.

=== St. Louis BattleHawks ===
On November 17, 2022, Brown was drafted by the St. Louis BattleHawks of the XFL. On February 10, 2023, Brown was released by the BattleHawks.

=== Arlington Renegades ===
Brown signed with the Arlington Renegades of the XFL on March 17, 2023. On May 13, in the XFL Championship, Brown recorded a receiving and a rushing touchdown each to help the Renegades win 35-26. He re-signed with the team on January 26, 2024. He was placed on Injured reserve on May 22. He was released on January 30, 2025.
