= Daniel Faalele =

Australian-born American football player (born 1999)

No. 68 – Jacksonville Jaguars
- Position: Guard
- Roster status: Active

Personal information
- Born: 9 November 1999 (age 26); Melbourne, Victoria, Australia
- Listed height: 6 ft 8 in (2.03 m)
- Listed weight: 380 lb (172 kg)

Career information
- High school: IMG (Bradenton, Florida, U.S.)
- College: Minnesota (2018–2021)
- NFL draft: 2022: 4th round, 110th overall pick

Career history
- Baltimore Ravens (2022–2025); New York Giants (2026)*; Jacksonville Jaguars (2026–present)
- * Offseason or practice squad member only

Awards and highlights
- First-team All-Big Ten (2021)

Career NFL statistics as of 2025
- Games played: 66
- Games started: 35
- Stats at Pro Football Reference

Daniel Faalele (/fɑːɑːˈleɪleɪ/ fah-ah-LAY-lay; born 9 November 1999) is an Australian professional American football guard for the Jacksonville Jaguars of the National Football League (NFL). He played college football for the Minnesota Golden Gophers and was selected by the Ravens in the fourth round of the 2022 NFL draft.

== Early life ==
Faalele was born on 9 November 1999 in Melbourne, Victoria, to a Samoan father and Tongan mother. According to a 2017 USA Today article, his father was 6 ft 4 in (1.93 m) tall, weighing 290 pounds (130 kg). Faalele played basketball and rugby union as a youth until a member of the coaching staff of the University of Hawaiʻi football team discovered him while scouting players in Australia.

After participating in a local satellite camp run by Michigan head coach Jim Harbaugh and garnering interest from multiple Division I programs, Faalele was recruited to play football at IMG Academy in Bradenton, Florida. After only practising and learning the sport in 2016, he was a starter on IMG's offensive line in 2017 as the team went undefeated and he was selected to play in the 2018 Under Armour All-America Game. Faalele was rated a four star prospect and committed to play college football at Minnesota over offers from Alabama, Florida State, Georgia, LSU and Michigan.

== College career ==
Faalele played in 10 games for the Gophers as a true freshman, starting the final eight games of the season at right tackle and was named honourable mention All-Big Ten Conference. Following the season, he was listed as one of Australia's 50 Greatest Living Athletes by GQ Australia. Faalele started 11 games at right tackle and was again named honorable mention All-Big Ten as a sophomore. As a junior in 2020, Faalele opted out of the season due to the COVID-19 crisis. Despite projections that Faalele would enter the 2021 NFL draft, he decided to stay with Minnesota for his senior year. On 28 December 2021, in his final college game, he scored his first career touchdown in the Guaranteed Rate Bowl against West Virginia, with a two-yard run up the middle.

== Professional career ==
Pre-draft measurables
Height	Weight	Arm length	Hand span	Wingspan	40-yard dash	10-yard split	20-yard split	20-yard shuttle	Three-cone drill	Vertical jump	Broad jump	Bench press
6 ft 8 in (2.03 m)	384 lb (174 kg)	35 1/8 in (0.89 m)	11 in (0.28 m)	7 ft 1 1/8 in (2.16 m)	5.60 s	2.04 s	3.25 s	5.06 s	8.47 s	29.5 in (0.75 m)	7 ft 10 in (2.39 m)	24 reps
All values from NFL Combine/Pro Day

=== Baltimore Ravens ===
Faalele was selected by the Baltimore Ravens in the fourth round, 110th overall, of the 2022 NFL draft. At 174 kilograms (384 lb), Faalele became the heaviest rostered player in the NFL. As a rookie, he appeared in 16 games and made one start. During his final season with the Ravens in 2025, Faalele came under heavy criticism by Ravens fans and reporters for poor in-game performances, with many giving him descriptions such as "the worst offensive lineman in Ravens history".

=== New York Giants ===
On April 8, 2026, Faalele signed a one-year contract with the New York Giants, reuniting him with head coach John Harbaugh.

=== Jacksonville Jaguars ===
On August 19, 2026, Faalele was traded to the Jacksonville Jaguars in exchange for a 2027 sixth-round pick.
