= Jarret Doege =

American football player (born 1997)

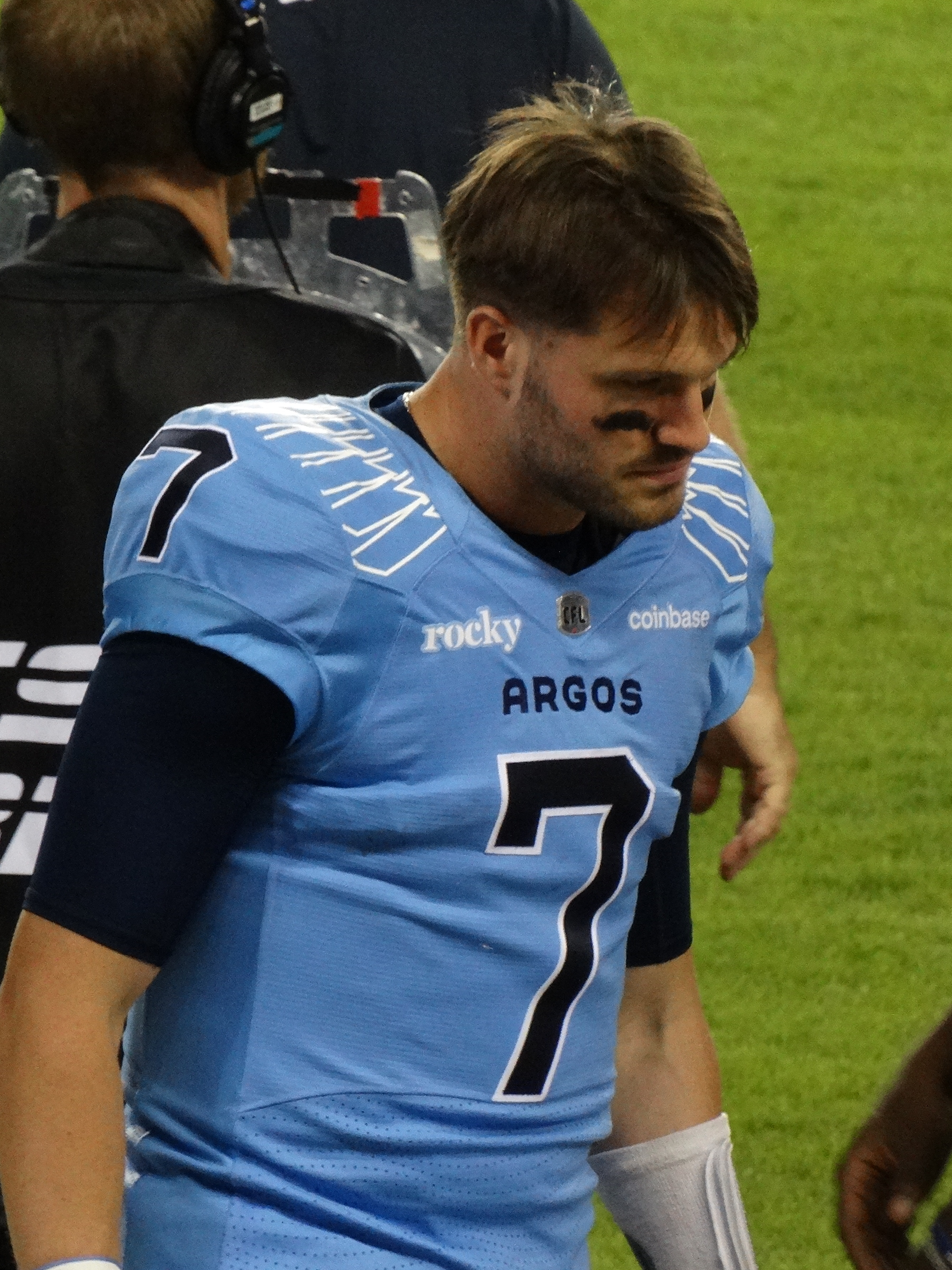
- Doege with the Toronto Argonauts in 2025

Profile
- Position: Quarterback

Personal information
- Born: December 5, 1997 (age 28); Lubbock, Texas, U.S.
- Listed height: 6 ft 2 in (1.88 m)
- Listed weight: 196 lb (89 kg)

Career information
- High school: Lubbock-Cooper
- College: Bowling Green (2017–2018); West Virginia (2019–2021); Troy (2022)
- NFL draft: 2023: undrafted

Career history
- Edmonton Elks (2023–2024); Toronto Argonauts (2025); BC Lions (2026)*; Hamilton Tiger-Cats (2026)
- * Offseason or practice squad member only

Career CFL statistics as of 2025
- Passing completions: 140
- Passing attempts: 210
- Passing yards: 1,498
- TD–INT: 8–11
- Stats at CFL.ca

Jarret Doege (DAY-gee; born December 5, 1997) is an American professional football quarterback. He was most recently a member of the Hamilton Tiger-Cats of the Canadian Football League (CFL). He played college football for the Bowling Green Falcons, West Virginia Mountaineers and Troy Trojans.

== Early life ==
Doege played at Lubbock-Cooper High School in Lubbock, Texas. Although he passed for 3,363 yards and 33 touchdowns during his senior season, he was not heavily recruited. Rated as the No. 55 pro–style quarterback in the country by 247Sports.com, he committed to Bowling Green on March 28, 2016.

== College career ==
=== Bowling Green ===
As a freshman at Bowling Green, Doege battled with James Morgan throughout the season for the starting quarterback position, eventually winning the job by the end of the season. In seven games, he passed for 1,381 yards, 12 touchdowns, and 3 interceptions.

Doege was named the starting quarterback at Bowling Green for his sophomore season after Morgan's transfer to FIU. In his first season as the starter, he passed for 2,660 yards, 27 touchdowns, and 15 interceptions. The team, however, struggled as they went 3–9 and fired head coach Mike Jinks after the season.

=== West Virginia ===
On May 8, 2019, Doege announced that he was entering the transfer portal and leaving Bowling Green. Eight days later, he committed to West Virginia under head coach Neal Brown, who had coached his brother Seth as an offensive coordinator at Texas Tech. He was redshirted, but he was able to play in four games under the NCAA's new transfer rules. Playing behind starter Austin Kendall, he passed for 818 yards, 7 touchdowns, and 3 interceptions.

Doege beat out Kendall to start for West Virginia before the 2020 season. During the 2020 season, he threw for 2,587 yards, 14 touchdowns, and 4 interceptions while West Virginia finished with a 6–4 record. On December 31, 2021, Doege announced he would enter the transfer portal once again.

=== Western Kentucky ===
On January 16, 2022, Doege announced he would transfer to Western Kentucky. However, he lost the quarterback competition during fall camp, and would enter the transfer portal for the third time.

=== Troy ===
On August 18, 2022, Doege announced he would transfer to Troy. During the season, Troy beat Western Kentucky 34–27 on October 1. Doege came in the game for injured starter Gunnar Watson and completed 7 of 8 passes for 71 yards and 2 touchdowns. Doege referenced a similar quote by Seattle Seahawks quarterback Geno Smith when he said, "They wrote me off, I didn't write back though." via Instagram after the game.

== Professional career ==
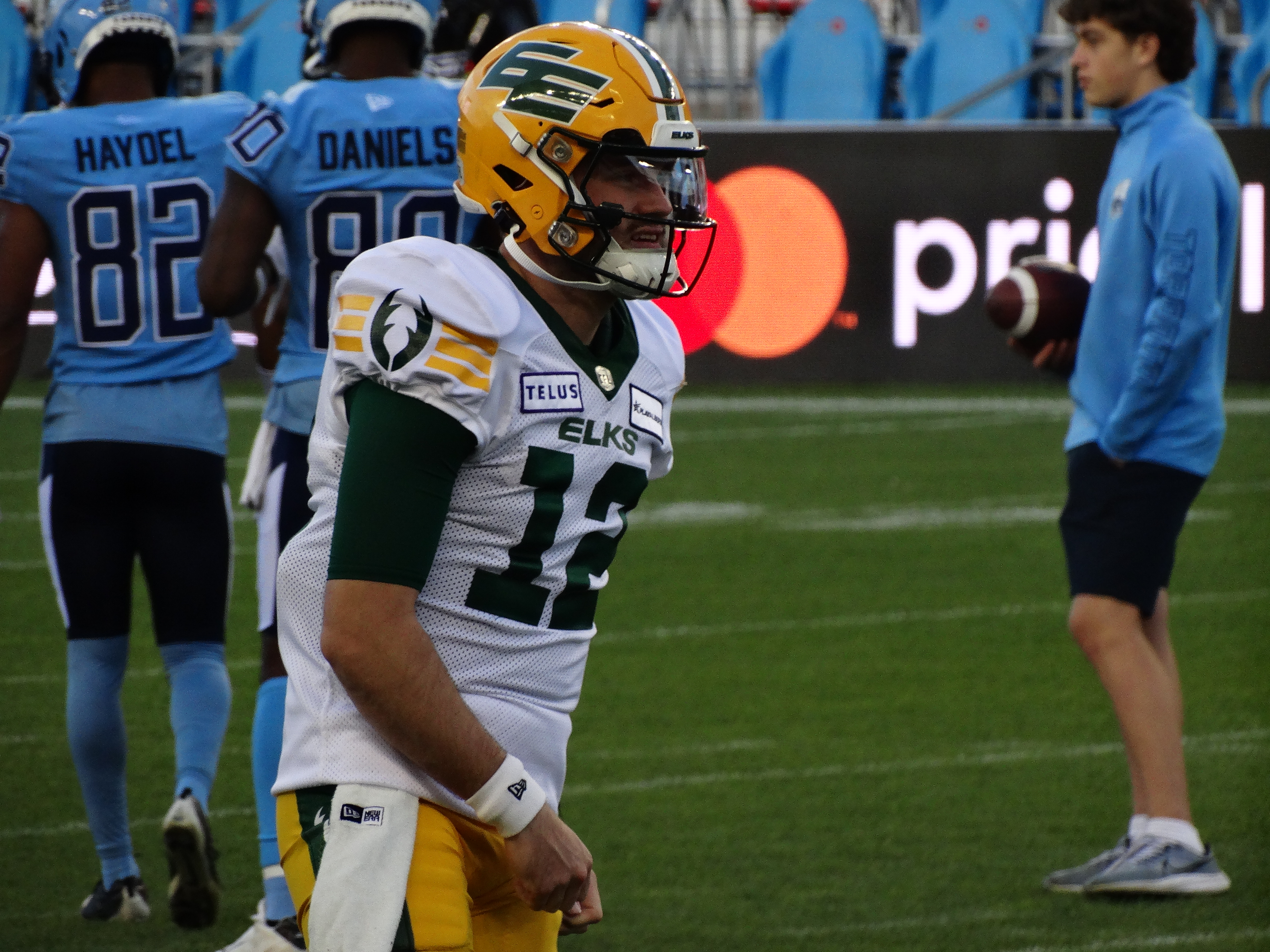
Doege with the Edmonton Elks in 2023

=== Edmonton Elks ===
Doege signed with Edmonton Elks on April 3, 2023. After being a healthy scratch for the team's first two matches Doege was activated for the Elks' Week 3 match against the Toronto Argonauts. After Taylor Cornelius and Kai Locksley struggled to move the ball head coach and general manager Chris Jones brought him into the game in the late third quarter. In his professional debut, he completed nine of 11 pass attempts for 163 yards and two touchdowns, and one interception which was returned for a touchdown by defensive back Royce Metchie. In his first career start, on June 30, 2023, Doege completed 19 of 33 pass attempts for 223 yards, one touchdown, and three interceptions in the loss to the Ottawa Redblacks. He dressed in 16 regular season games, starting in one, where he completed 42 of 65 pass attempts for 587 yards, four touchdowns, and four interceptions.

In 2024, Doege dressed in just four regular season games, completing one of three pass attempts for six yards. He was released shortly before 2025 training camp on May 2, 2025.

=== Toronto Argonauts ===
On May 27, 2025, it was announced that Doege had signed with the Toronto Argonauts. With the injury to the team's incumbent starter, Chad Kelly, Doege served as the primary backup to Nick Arbuckle to begin the season. By week 15, he had taken one snap all season, a one-yard rushing touchdown, but was thurst into action against his former team, the Elks, in the fourth quarter when Arbuckle had to sit out due to a calf injury. Down two points with 1:08 left to play, Doege drove 40 yards to set up Lirim Hajrullahu's 48-yard game-winning field goal to secure the victory. With Arbuckle expected to be out two to four weeks, Doege was named the starter for the team's week 16 game against the Montreal Alouettes. In that game, he completed 25 of 27 pass attempts for 207 yards with one touchdown pass and one interception as the Argonauts lost 21–19. Arbuckle returned sooner than expected for the team's next game, against the BC Lions, and started the following game against the Hamilton Tiger-Cats. However, Arbuckle was injured on the team's first drive of that game, with Doege taking over. He completed 34 of 49 pass attempts for 324 yards with two touchdowns, but also threw four interceptions and was sacked seven times in the loss to the Tiger-Cats. Doege's 34 completions coming in relief of the starter set a CFL record, besting Taylor Powell's record 30 completions set in 2024. Soon after the game, the Argonauts announced that Arbuckle would be out for the rest of the season and that Doege would be the starter for the next game against the Saskatchewan Roughriders.

On May 13, 2026, Doege was released by the Argonauts.

=== BC Lions ===
On May 15, 2026, Doege signed with the BC Lions. On May 31, Doege was released by Lions, during their final cuts before the start of the 2026 CFL season.

=== Hamilton Tiger-Cats ===
On July 8, 2026, Doege signed with the Hamilton Tiger-Cats after an injury to Bo Levi Mitchell. He dressed in one game and was later released on August 25.

== Career statistics ==
=== CFL ===
Year	Team	Games			Passing								Rushing			
Year	Team	GD	GS	Rec	Cmp	Att	Pct	Yds	Y/A	TD	Int	Rtg	Att	Yds	Avg	TD
2023	EDM	16	1	0–1	42	65	64.6	587	9.0	4	4	88.4	7	18	2.6	0
2024	EDM	4	0	—	1	3	33.3	6	2.0	0	0	42.4	1	4	4.0	0
2025	TOR	18	3	0–3	97	142	68.3	905	6.4	4	7	74.4	9	29	3.2	1
Career		38	4	0–4	140	210	66.7	1,498	7.1	8	11	78.2	17	52	3.1	1

=== College ===
Year	Team	Games			Passing								Rushing			
Year	Team	GP	GS	Record	Cmp	Att	Pct	Yds	Avg	TD	INT	Rtg	Att	Yds	Avg	TD
2017	Bowling Green	7	6 (Note: Doege's GS on 11/15/17 (Toledo) and 9/29/18 (Georgia Tech) were not credited to him. The GS were instead received by defensive player Clint Stephens, who wore the same number (#2) as Doege. Play-by-play game logs and film show Doege was the starting quarterback. For the purpose of this chart, the GS are credited to Doege.)	1–5	120	188	63.8	1,381	7.3	12	3	143.4	30	-74	-2.5	2
2018	Bowling Green	12	12	3–9	242	389	62.2	2,660	6.8	27	12	136.4	51	-188	-3.7	2
2019	West Virginia	4	3	2–1	79	120	65.8	818	6.8	7	3	137.3	11	-41	-3.7	0
2020	West Virginia	10	10	6–4	239	374	63.9	2,587	6.9	14	4	132.2	40	-101	-2.5	2
2021	West Virginia	13	13	6–7	272	417	65.2	3,048	7.3	19	12	135.9	66	-134	-2.0	1
2022	Troy	7	2	2–0	44	64	68.8	575	9.0	5	3	160.6	14	-39	-2.8	0
Career		53	46	20–26	996	1,552	64.2	11,069	7.1	84	37	137.2	212	-577	-2.8	7

== Personal life ==
Doege's older brother, Seth, is a college offensive coordinator and quarterbacks coach at The University of Arizona and was a player at Texas Tech.
