= 2020 Kansas Jayhawks football team =

American college football season

2020 Kansas Jayhawks football
- Conference: Big 12 Conference
- Record: 0–9 (0–8 Big 12)
- Head coach: Les Miles (2nd season)
- Offensive coordinator: Brent Dearmon (2nd season)
- Offensive scheme: Power spread
- Defensive coordinator: D. J. Eliot (2nd season)
- Base defense: 3–4
- Home stadium: David Booth Kansas Memorial Stadium

Uniform
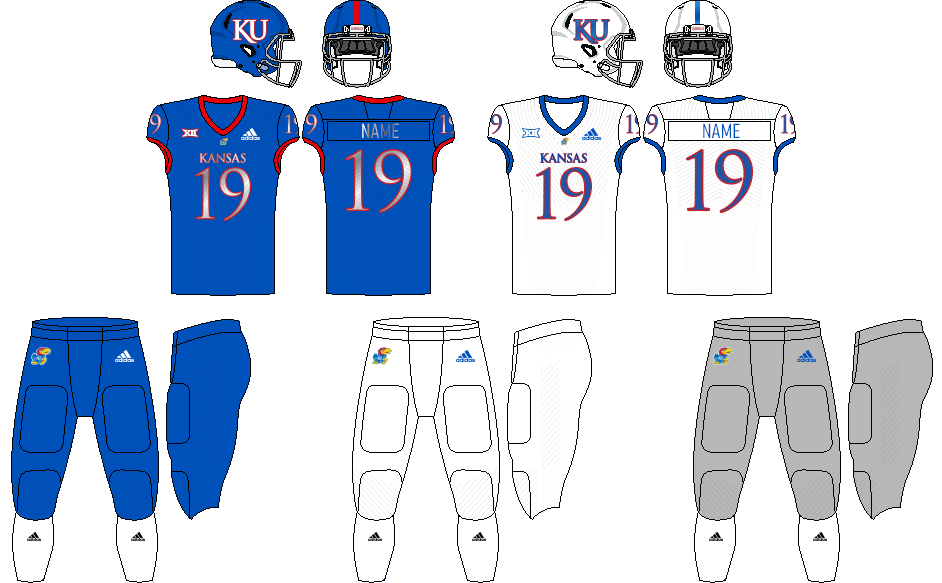

2020 Big 12 Conference football standings
	Conf.			Overall
Team	W		L	W		L
No. 9 Iowa State y	8	–	1	9	–	3
No. 6 Oklahoma y$	6	–	2	9	–	2
No. 20 Oklahoma State	6	–	3	8	–	3
No. 19 Texas	5	–	3	7	–	3
TCU	5	–	4	6	–	4
West Virginia	4	–	4	6	–	4
Kansas State	4	–	5	4	–	6
Texas Tech	3	–	6	4	–	6
Baylor	2	–	7	2	–	7
Kansas	0	–	8	0	–	9
Championship: Oklahoma 27, Iowa State 21
$ – Conference champion; y – Championship game participant; Rankings from AP Poll.

The 2020 Kansas Jayhawks football team represented the University of Kansas as a member of Big 12 Conference during the 2020 NCAA Division I FBS football season. It was the Jayhawks 131st season. It was the second and final year under Les Miles. The team play home games at David Booth Kansas Memorial Stadium in Lawrence, Kansas.

The Jayhawks began the season 0–4 and struggled statistically through the first four games, losing by an average of 20.5 points, while being outgained on offense on average 451.8 to 261.3 and having a turnover margin of –4. Through games on October 17, they were one of only two winless teams in the country that had played at least four games.

The Jayhawks finished winless for only the third time in school history and the second time since the 2015 season.

== Offseason ==
=== Starters lost ===
Overall, the Jayhawks had 25 players run out of eligibility. Below are the starters from 2019 who have run out of eligibility.

Name	Position
Hakeem Adeniji	T
Jelani Brown	DT
Daylon Charlot	WR
Hasan Defense	CB
Azur Kamara	LB
Mike Lee	S
Clyde McCualley III	G
Ben Miles	FB
Darrius Moragne	DE
Carter Stanley	QB
Najee Stevens-McKenzie	LB
Bryce Torneden	S
Andru Tovi	C

=== Coaching staff changes ===
Name	Position	Replacement
Clint Bowen	Safeties	Jordan Peterson
Todd Bradford	Linebackers	D. J. Elliot*
Tony Hull	Running backs	Jonathan Wallace
Vacant	Special teams	Jonathan Wallace
Vacant	Outside linebackers	Chidera Uzo-Diribe
Luke Meadows†	Offensive line	John Morookian

*Spent 2019 as defensive coordinator, will maintain that role along the other additional duties as linebackers coach
†Fired during the season

=== Recruiting ===
The Jayhawks have 26 commitments for their 2020 recruiting class. Below is the breakdown. In addition to their 26 recruited freshmen, the Jayhawks also have 13 walk-on freshmen. The only positions KU did not have any recruits for were running back, kicker, and punter.

==== Overall class ranking ====
Website	Overall rank	Conference rank	4 star recruits	3 star recruits
Rivals	50	8	0	19
247 Sports	57	10	0	26

==== Positional breakdown ====
Position	Number
WR	6
TE	2
QB	1
OL	5
LB	3
DL	2
DB	4
ATH	2

All information above is as of April 2, 2020

=== Left team during the season ===
Player	Position
Pooka Williams Jr.	RB
Dru Prox	LB
Kyle Thompson	P

== Big 12 media poll ==
The 2020 preseason poll was released on July 17, 2020. The Jayhawks were picked last for the 10th consecutive season, receiving 80 out of 90 possible last place votes.

Big 12 media poll
Predicted finish	Team	Votes (1st place)
1	Oklahoma	888 (80)
2	Oklahoma State	742 (6)
3	Texas	727 (4)
4	Iowa State	607
5	Baylor	489
6	TCU	477
7	Kansas State	366
8	West Virginia	287
9	Texas Tech	267
10	Kansas	100

== Schedule ==
=== COVID-19 impact ===
On June 20, 2020, the University of Kansas announced it had tested 86 football players and 110 staff members. Only one player tested positive and no staff members. One player tested positive for the antibody test, indicating the player had it in the past, but no longer had it. On July 3, the team announced that another 11 players had tested positive and that they would be suspending in-person voluntary workouts. Kansas was scheduled to play New Hampshire, but the game was canceled following the CAA’s decision to not play football during the 2020 season due to the COVID-19 pandemic. Following the cancellation, KU athletic director Jeff Long said in a statement that they will look into finding an opponent to replace New Hampshire in the opening of the schedule. On July 25, Kansas announced it had replaced the game with New Hampshire with a game on August 29 against Southern Illinois, but that game was later cancelled. On July 29, their game against Boston College was also canceled. On August 3, the Big 12 announced they would play a 10-game schedule that included all conference games and one non-conference game. On August 12, the Big 12 announced the conference portion of the revised schedule. On August 31, the school announced that they will begin the season without fans in attendance, but did not specify how many games will be played without fans. On September 24, Long announced a maximum of 10,000 fans would be allowed to attend through the month of October. On October 8, head coach Les Miles announced that he had tested positive for COVID-19. Because of his positive test, he did not coach the game against West Virginia. A few days before the Jayhawks November 21 game against Texas, it was rescheduled for December 14, then it was cancelled altogether on December 10. In total, four of the Jayhawks games were cancelled due to COVID-19.

=== Season schedule ===
Every game listed below had a limited or no attendance due to COVID-19.

Date	Time	Opponent	Site	TV	Result	Attendance
September 12	9:00 p.m.	Coastal Carolina*	David Booth Kansas Memorial Stadium; Lawrence, KS	FS1	L 23–38	0*
September 26	6:30 p.m.	at Baylor	McLane Stadium; Waco, TX	ESPNU	L 14–47	11,667
October 3	2:30 p.m.	No. 17 Oklahoma State^{†}	David Booth Kansas Memorial Stadium; Lawrence, KS	ESPN	L 7–47	9,480
October 17	11:00 a.m.	at West Virginia	Milan Puskar Stadium; Morgantown, WV	FOX	L 17–38	10,759
October 24	11:00 a.m.	at No. 20 Kansas State	Bill Snyder Family Stadium; Manhattan, KS (Sunflower Showdown)	FS1	L 14–55	10,801
October 31	11:00 a.m.	No. 23 Iowa State	David Booth Kansas Memorial Stadium; Lawrence, KS	FS1	L 22–52	9,652
November 7	2:30 p.m.	at No. 19 Oklahoma	Gaylord Family Oklahoma Memorial Stadium; Norman, OK	ESPN	L 9–62	22,700
November 28	7:00 p.m.	TCU	David Booth Kansas Memorial Stadium; Lawrence, KS	FS1	L 23–59	0*
December 5	11:00 a.m.	at Texas Tech	Jones AT&T Stadium; Lubbock, TX	FS2	L 13–16	9,877
*Non-conference game; ^{†}Homecoming; Rankings from AP Poll and CFP Rankings (after November 24) released prior to game; All times are in Central time

*No fans in attendance due to COVID-19

== Roster ==
2020 Kansas Jayhawks Football
Quarterback: 3 Miles Kendrick Junior; 7 Thomas MacVittie Senior; 13 Jordan Preston (redshirt) Freshman; 14 Jordan Medley Freshman; 15 Miles Fallin Junior; 17 Jalon Daniels Freshman; Running back: 0 Velton Gardner Sophomore; 6 Jack Codwell Freshman; 12 Torry Locklin (redshirt) Freshman; 20 Daniel Hishaw Jr. Freshman; 22 Rob Fiorentino Sophomore; 23 Amauri Pesek-Hickson Freshman; 25 Gayflor Flomo Junior; 29 Ben Miles FB Junior; 33 Spencer Roe FB Sophomore; 46 Sam Schroeder FB Junior; 47 Jared Casey FB Freshman; Wide receiver: 2 Lawrence Arnold Freshman; 4 Andrew Parchment Senior; 5 Stephon Robinson Jr. Senior; 8 Kwamie Lassiter II Senior; 10 Tristan Golightly Freshman; 11 Ezra Naylor II Senior; 16 Takulve Williams Junior; 18 Jordan Brown Freshman; 19 Steven McBride Freshman; 24 Malik Johnson Freshman; 27 Kyler Pearson Freshman; 36 Lawrence Shadd III (redshirt) Freshman; 80 Luke Grimm Freshman; 81 Kameron McQueen Senior; 83 Quentin Skinner Freshman; 85 Hunter Kaufman Junior; 88 Jamahl Horne Sophomore; Tight end: 34 Will Huggins Freshman; 45 Trevor Kardell Freshman; 82 James Sosinski (redshirt) Senior; 84 Jack Parks Sophomore; 86 Mac Copeland Sophomore; 87 Jack Luavasa Senior; 89 Mason Fairchild Sophomore	Offensive line: 55 Armaj Reed-Adams Freshman; 56 Ronaldo Sigers Freshman; 58 Api Mane Senior; 59 Jack Murphy Sophomore; 61 Malik Clark Senior; 62 Garrett Jones Freshman; 64 Jalan Robinson Sophomore; 66 Danny Robinson Freshman; 68 Earl Bostick Jr. (redshirt) Junior; 69 Joe Krause (redshirt) Freshman; 70 Nick Williams Sophomore; 71 Jacobi Lott Sophomore; 72 Adagio Lopeti Senior; 73 Jack Werner (redshirt) Freshman; 74 Jackson Satterwhite Freshman; 76 Chris Hughes Senior; 77 Bryce Cabeldue Freshman; 78 Nicholas Martinez Freshman; 79 Joseph Gilbertson Junior; Defensive line: 38 Clinton Anokwuru Freshman; 50 Marcus Harris (redshirt) Freshman; 51 Jack Stallard (redshirt) Freshman; 53 Caleb Taylor Freshman; 90 Jereme Robinson Freshman; 91 Jelani Arnold Junior; 93 Sam Burt Senior; 95 DaJon Terry (redshirt) Freshman; 96 Zack Biddison Junior; 97 Kenean Caldwell Freshman; 98 Caleb Sampson Junior; 99 Malcolm Lee Junior; Linebacker: 14 Steven Parker (redshirt) Freshman; 15 Kyron Johnson Senior; 18 Denzel Feaster Senior; 19 Gavin Potter Sophomore; 23 Alonso Person Freshman; 28 Taiwan Berryhill Freshman; 30 Cooper Root Junior; 32 Dylan Downing (redshirt) Freshman; 37 Hayden Hatcher Junior; 43 Jay Dineen Junior; 49 Krishawn Brown Freshman	Defensive back: 1 Kenny Logan Jr. CB Sophomore; 3 Ricky Thomas S Senior; 4 Elijah Jones CB Senior; 5 Gabe Garber S Freshman; 6 Valerian Agbaw Jr. CB (redshirt) Freshman; 7 Davon Ferguson S Junior; 8 Kyle Mayberry CB Senior; 9 Karon Prunty CB Freshman; 10 Julian Chandler S Senior; 11 Johnquai Lewis CB Freshman; 13 Ra'Mello Dotson CB Freshman; 17 Corione Harris CB Junior; 20 Donovan Gaines CB Freshman; 22 Duece Mayberry CB Freshman; 25 David Carter CB Junior; 26 Cody McNerney S Sophomore; 34 Nate Betts S (redshirt) Senior; 35 Nick Caudle S Junior; 39 Ryan Malbrough S Sophomore; 41 Nick Channel S Sophomore; 45 Tyler Stottle S (redshirt) Freshman; Special teams: 24 Reis Vernon P Freshman; 44 Tabor Allen K Freshman; 46 Liam Jones K Senior; 57 Emory Duggar LS Freshman; 60 Luke Hosford LS (redshirt) Freshman; 67 Logan Klusman LS Senior; 83 Jacob Borcila K (redshirt) Freshman; 91 Cole Brungardt K Junior; 92 Donovan Gagen P/K Senior; Roster updated: September 12, 2020

=== Positional breakdown ===
Position	Number
QB	6
RB	12
WR	17
TE	7
OL	19
DL	12
LB	12
DB	21
ST	10
Total	116

=== Breakdown by class ===
Class	Number
Fr	39
So	16
Jr	22
Sr	39

== Game summaries ==
Game lines listed below are subject to multiple changes leading up to the game. The line listed is the last available line. Lines are from Bovada.

=== Coastal Carolina ===
Coastal Carolina at Kansas

Team	1	2	3	4	Total
• Chanticleers	14	14	0	10	38
Jayhawks	0	3	14	6	23

- Date: September 12, 2020
- Location: David Booth Kansas Memorial Stadium
  Lawrence, KS
- Game start: 9:00 p.m. CDT
- Elapsed time: 3:28
- Game attendance: None due to COVID-19
- Game weather: 68 °F (20 °C) • Weather: Clear • Wind: NNW 6 MPH
- Referee: Kyle Olson
- TV announcers (Fox Sports 1): Tim Brando, Spencer Tillman

Scoring summary
1	6:22	Coastal Carolina	Grayson McCall 12 yard run (Massimo Biscardi kick)	7–0 CCU
1	2:37	Coastal Carolina	C.J. Brewer 2 yard pass from Grayson McCall (Massimo Biscardi kick)	14–0 CCU
2	10:57	Coastal Carolina	Isaiah Likely 2 yard pass from Grayson McCall (Massimo Biscardi kick)	21–0 CCU
2	0:55	Coastal Carolina	Jaivon Heiligh 25 yard pass from Grayson McCall (Massimo Biscardi kick)	28–0 CCU
2	0:00	Kansas	Jacob Borcila 47 yard field goal	28–3 CCU
3	2:29	Kansas	Andrew Parchment 14 yard pass from Miles Kendrick (Miles Kendrick pass to Kwamie Lassiter II for two-point Conversion)	28–11 CCU
3	0:04	Kansas	Velton Gardner 61 yard run (Two-Point Pass Conversion Failed)	28–17 CCU
4	9:55	Coastal Carolina	Grayson McCall 2 yard run (Massimo Biscardi Kick)	35–17 CCU
4	7:00	Kansas	Kwamie Lassiter II 5 yard pass from Miles Kendrick (Two-point pass conversion failed)	35–23 CCU
4	1:13	Coastal Carolina	Massimo Biscardi 27 yard field goal	38–23 CCU

Statistics	CCU	KU
First downs	19	23
Total yards	318	367
Rushing yards	185	178
Passing yards	133	189
Turnovers	0	3
Time of possession	30:25	29:35

Team	Category	Player	Statistics
Coastal Carolina	Passing	Grayson McCall	11–18, 133 yards, 3 TD
Coastal Carolina	Rushing	C. J. Marable	21 carries, 75 yards
Coastal Carolina	Receiving	Jaivon Heiligh	3 receptions, 74 yards, 1 TD
Kansas	Passing	Miles Kendrick	15–24, 156 yards, 2 TD, 1 INT
Kansas	Rushing	Velton Gardner	11 carries, 81 yards, 1 TD
Kansas	Receiving	Kwamie Lassiter II	5 receptions, 63 yards, 1 TD

The game was originally scheduled for September 26 at Brooks Stadium in Conway, South Carolina, but was moved to Lawrence. The Chanticleers began the game with a 28–0 run, shutting out Kansas until they kicked a field goal as time expired in the first half. The Jayhawks would outscore Coastal Carolina 20–10 in the second half, but the Chanticleers still held on to win the game.

=== At Baylor ===
Kansas at Baylor

Team	1	2	3	4	Total
Jayhawks	7	0	0	7	14
• Bears	7	10	14	16	47

- Date: September 26, 2020
- Location: McLane Stadium
  Waco, TX
- Game start: 6:30 p.m. CDT
- Elapsed time: 3:33
- Game attendance: 11,667 (limited due to COVID-19)
- Game weather: 85 °F (29 °C) • Weather: Fair • Wind: SSE 5-10 MPH
- Referee: Kevin Mar
- TV announcers (ESPNU): Roy Philpott, Kelly Stouffer

Scoring summary
1	11:29	KU	Pooka Williams Jr. 21 yard run (Jacob Borcila kick)	7–0 KU
1	5:24	BU	Trestan Ebner 1 yard run (John Mayers kick)	7—7 Tied
2	8:07	BU	John Mayers 47 yard Field Goal	10–7 BU
2	4:13	BU	Trestan Ebner 18 yard pass from Charlie Brewer (John Mayers kick)	17–7 BU
3	14:44	BU	Trestan Ebner 100 yard kickoff return (John Mayers kick)	24–7 BU
3	9:07	BU	John Lovett 7 yards run (John Mayers kick)	31–7 BU
4	12:50	BU	Jalon Daniels sacked by Terrel Bernard for a safety	33–7 BU
4	12:35	BU	Trestan Ebner 83 yard kickoff return (John Mayers kick)	40–7 BU
4	7:03	KU	Pooka Williams Jr. 16 yard run (Jacob Borcila kick)	40–14 BU
4	4:00	BU	Craig Williams 26 yard run (John Mayers kick)	47–14 BU

Statistics	KU	BAY
First downs	20	24
Total yards	328	352
Rushing yards	169	203
Passing yards	159	149
Turnovers	0	0
Time of possession	31:30	28:30

Team	Category	Player	Statistics
Kansas	Passing	Jalon Daniels	19–33, 159 yards
Kansas	Rushing	Pooka Williams Jr.	14 carries, 76 yards, 2 TD
Kansas	Receiving	Kwamie Lassiter II	6 receptions, 65 yards
Baylor	Passing	Charlie Brewer	15–23, 142 yards, 1 TD
Baylor	Rushing	John Lovett	17 carries, 78 yards, 1 TD
Baylor	Receiving	Trestan Ebner	2 receptions, 53 yards, 1 TD

The Jayhawks scored 3 minutes and 31 minutes into the game on a 21-yard run by Pooka Williams Jr. After that, Baylor would score 40 unanswered points scoring 5 touchdowns, a field goal, and a safety, including a 100-yard kickoff return for a touchdown at the start of the second half. Williams added another touchdown late in the game, as did Baylor running back Craig Williams. The Jayhawks would lose 14–47, extending their Big 12 road conference losing streak to 46 games dating back to October 4, 2008, when the Jayhawks defeated Iowa State 35–33.

=== No. 17 Oklahoma State ===
No. 17 Oklahoma State at Kansas

Team	1	2	3	4	Total
• No. 17 Cowboys	10	21	13	3	47
Jayhawks	0	0	0	7	7

- Date: October 3, 2020
- Location: David Booth Kansas Memorial Stadium
  Lawrence, KS
- Game start: 12:30 p.m. CDT
- Elapsed time: 3:26
- Game attendance: 9,480 (limited due to COVID-19)
- Game weather: 67 °F (19 °C) • Weather: Partly cloudy • Wind: NNW 14 MPH
- Referee: Kevin Hassell
- TV announcers (ESPN): Dave Pasch, Mike Golic and Paul Carcaterra

Scoring summary
1	9:36	OSU	Alex Hale 19 yard field goal	3–0 OSU
1	1:00	OSU	Chuba Hubbard 1 yard run (Alex Hale extra point good)	10–0 OSU
2	14:04	OSU	Shane Illingworth 66 yard pass to Braydon Johnson (Alex Hale extra point good)	17–0 OSU
2	9:22	OSU	Shane Illingworth 55 yard pass to Tylan Wallace (Alex Hale extra point good)	24–0 OSU
2	1:58	OSU	Chuba Hubbard 12 yard run (Alex Hale extra point good)	31–0 OSU
3	13:14	OSU	Shane Illingworth 14 yard pass to Tylan Wallace (Alex Hale extra point good)	38–0 OSU
3	8:12	OSU	Alex Hale 22 yard field goal	41–0 OSU
3	3:18	OSU	Alex Hale 27 yard field goal	44–0 OSU
4	12:04	KU	Velton Gardner 1 yard run (Jacob Borcila extra point good)	44–7 KU
4	0:59	OSU	Tom Hutton 24 yard field goal	47–7 OSU

Statistics	OKST	KU
First downs	31	12
Total yards	593	193
Rushing yards	295	101
Passing yards	298	92
Turnovers	0	1
Time of possession	31:54	28:06

Team	Category	Player	Statistics
Oklahoma State	Passing	Shane Illingworth	17–23, 265 yards, 3 TD
Oklahoma State	Rushing	Chuba Hubbard	20 carries, 145 yards, 2 TD
Oklahoma State	Receiving	Tylan Wallace	9 receptions, 148 yards, 2 TD
Kansas	Passing	Miles Kendrick	11–19, 90 yards, 1 INT
Kansas	Rushing	Daniel Hishaw Jr.	5 carries, 51 yards
Kansas	Receiving	Kwamie Lassiter II	4 reception, 41 yards

The game featured two of the premier running backs in the Big 12, Pooka Williams Jr. of Kansas and Chuba Hubbard from Oklahoma State, who are both top 10 all-time in career rushing yards at their respective schools. Williams was held to a season low 32 yards rushing and a 2.2 yard average, while Hubbard ran for 145 yards and two touchdowns. The Jayhawks were dominated on both sides of the ball throughout the game as they were held to only 193 yards of total offense and allowed 593 yards on defense. The Jayhawks were shut out through the first three quarters of the game and didn't score until Oklahoma State had taken their starters out of the game. The loss extended the Jayhawks losing streak against teams ranked in the AP poll to 39 games.

=== At West Virginia ===
Kansas at West Virginia

Team	1	2	3	4	Total
Jayhawks	10	0	0	7	17
• Mountaineers	7	10	7	14	38

- Date: October 17, 2020
- Location: Milan Puskar Stadium
  Morgantown, WV
- Game start: 11:00 a.m. CDT
- Elapsed time: 3:33
- Game attendance: 10,759 (limited due to COVID-19)
- Game weather: 53 °F (12 °C) • Weather: Sunny • Wind: SW 6 MPH
- Referee: Michael Vandervelde
- TV announcers (FS1): Gus Johnson and Joel Klatt

Scoring summary
1	11:41	KU	Jacob Borcila 41 yard field goal	3–0 KU
1	9:21	KU	Miles Kendrick 43 yard pass to Andrew Parchment (Jacob Borcila extra point good)	10–0 KU
1	4:53	WVU	Jarret Doege pass to Bryce Ford-Wheaton for 33 yard (Evan Staley extra point good)	10–7 KU
2	3:25	WVU	Jarret Doege 6 yard pass to Leddie Brown	14–10 WVU
2	0:16	WVU	Evan Stanley 33 yard field goal	17–10 WVU
3	3:37	WVU	Leddie Brown 87 yard run (Evan Stanley extra point good)	24–10 WVU
4	14:55	WVU	Jarret Doege 8 yard pass to Sam James (Evan Stanley extra point good)	31–10 WVU
4	2:00	WVU	Alec Sinkfield run for 3 yards (Evan Stanley extra point good)	38–10 WVU
4	1:45	KU	Pooka Williams Jr. 93 yard kickoff return (Jacob Borcila extra point good)	38–17 WVU

Statistics	KU	WVU
First downs	7	29
Total yards	157	544
Rushing yards	62	226
Passing yards	95	318
Turnovers	2	2
Time of possession	27:05	32:55

Team	Category	Player	Statistics
Kansas	Passing	Miles Kendrick	14–23, 95 yards, 1 TD, 2 INT
Kansas	Rushing	Velton Gardner	11 carries, 43 yards
Kansas	Receiving	Andrew Parchment	6 receptions, 65 yards, 1 TD
West Virginia	Passing	Jarret Doege	26–44, 318 yards, 3 TD, 1 INT
West Virginia	Rushing	Leddie Brown	18 carries, 195 yards, 1 TD
West Virginia	Receiving	Bryce Ford-Wheaton	5 receptions, 89 yards, 1 TD

The team played the game without Les Miles due to his positive COVID-19 test. Joshua Eargle served as the interim head coach for the game. The Jayhawks jumped ahead to an early 10–0 lead including forcing their first turnover of the season. The Mountaineers would score 38 unanswered points before the Jayhawks would score again. The loss extended the Jayhawks losing streak in road conference games to 51. Following the game, two-time first team All-Big 12 running back Pooka Williams Jr. opted out of the remainder of the season.

=== At No. 20 Kansas State ===
Kansas at No. 20 Kansas State

Team	1	2	3	4	Total
Jayhawks	0	7	0	7	14
• No. 20 Wildcats	7	27	21	0	55

- Date: October 24, 2020
- Location: Bill Snyder Family Stadium
  Manhattan, KS
- Game start: 11:00 a.m. CDT
- Elapsed time: 3:30
- Game attendance: 10,081 (limited due to COVID-19)
- Game weather: 40 °F (4 °C) • Weather: Cloudy • Wind: SE 8 MPH
- Referee: Kevin Hassell
- TV announcers (FS1): Eric Collins, Ben Leber

Scoring summary
1	9:22	KSU	Phillip Brooks 55 yard punt return (Blake Lynch kick good)	7–0 KSU
2	11:23	KSU	Blake Lynch 32 yard field goal	10–0 KSU
2	6:13	KSU	Blake Lynch 21 yard field goal	13–0 KSU
2	5:26	KSU	Justin Gardner 24 yard interception return (Blake Lynch kick good)	20–0 KSU
2	2:16	KU	Jalon Daniels 8 yard run (Jacob Borcila kick good)	20–7 KSU
2	0:52	KSU	Will Howard 16 yard pass to Samuel Wheeler (Blake Lynch kick good)	27–7 KSU
2	0:00	KSU	Phillip Brooks 52 yard punt return (Blake Lynch kick good)	34–7 KSU
3	12:17	KSU	Deuce Vaughn 1 yard run (Blake Lynch kick good)	41–7 KSU
3	7:42	KSU	Harry Trotter 1 yard run (Blake Lynch kick good)	48–7 KSU
3	0:48	KSU	Will Howard 13 yard pass to Briley Moore (Blake Lynch kick good)	55–7 KSU
4	4:38	KU	Jalon Daniels 4 yard run (Jacob Borcila kick)	55–14 KSU

Statistics	KU	KSU
First downs	18	17
Total yards	320	381
Rushing yards	113	129
Passing yards	207	252
Turnovers	2	1
Time of possession	30:40	29:20

Team	Category	Player	Statistics
Kansas	Passing	Jalon Daniels	22–39, 207 yards, 1 INT
Kansas	Rushing	Velton Gardner	16 carries 72 yards
Kansas	Receiving	Kwamie Lassiter II	7 receptions, 58 yards
Kansas State	Passing	Will Howard	17–24, 243 yards, 2 touchdowns
Kansas State	Rushing	Deuce Vaughn	11 carries, 71 yards, 1 touchdown
Kansas State	Receiving	Deuce Vaughn	4 receptions, 81 yards

The Jayhawks began the game playing strong on defense holding K-State to no offensive touchdowns until late in the second quarter. However, due to poor special teams play and turnovers, they ended the 1st half down 7–34. They would eventually lose 14–55, extending multiple losing streaks: overall losing streak (9), AP ranked teams (39), road conference (52), and loses to K-State (12).

=== No. 23 Iowa State ===
No. 23 Iowa State at Kansas

Team	1	2	3	4	Total
• No. 23 Cyclones	13	7	15	17	52
Jayhawks	0	7	7	8	22

- Date: October 31, 2020
- Location: David Booth Kansas Memorial Stadium
  Lawrence, KS
- Game start: 11:00 a.m. CDT
- Elapsed time: 3:25
- Game attendance: 9,652 (limited due to COVID-19)
- Game weather: 57 °F (14 °C) • Weather: Clear • Wind: SSW 21 MPH
- Referee: Brad Van Vark
- TV announcers (FS1): Eric Collins, Ben Leber

Scoring summary
1	10:46	ISU	Kene Nwangwu 18 yard run	7–0 ISU
1	8:07	ISU	Brock Purdy 1 yard run (Connor Assalley extra point no good)	13–0 ISU
2	9:01	KU	Daniel Hishaw Jr. 5 yard run (Jacob Borcila extra point good)	13–7 ISU
2	4:00	ISU	Brock Purdy 3 yard pass to Charlie Kolar (Connor Assalley extra point good)	20–7 ISU
3	7:27	KU	Brock Purdy 36 yard pass to Xavier Hutchinson (Connor Assalley extra point good)	27–7 ISU
3	7:12	KU	Kenny Logan Jr. 100 yard kickoff return (Jacob Borcila extra point good)	27–14 ISU
3	3:14	ISU	Breece Hall 7 yard touchdown (Brock Purdy pass to Charlie Kolar for two point conversion)	35–14 ISU
4	11:02	ISU	Connor Assalley 40 yard field goal	38–14 ISU
4	7:34	ISU	Jalon Daniels 12 yard run (Andrew Parchment pass to Kwamie Lassiter for two point conversion)	38–22 ISU
4	5:05	ISU	Breece Hall 58 yard run (Connor Assalley extra point good)	45–22 ISU
4	2:14	ISU	Hunter Dekkers 30 yard pass to Joe Scares (Connor Assalley)	52–22 ISU

Statistics	ISU	KU
First downs	26	15
Total yards	552	240
Rushing yards	258	73
Passing yards	294	167
Turnovers	1	2
Time of possession	31:13	28:47

Team	Category	Player	Statistics
Iowa State	Passing	Brock Purdy	23–34 239 yards, 2 TDs, 1 INT
Iowa State	Rushing	Breece Hall	21 carries, 185 yards, 1 TD
Iowa State	Receiving	Xavier Hutchinson	5 receptions, 87 yards, 1 TD
Kansas	Passing	Jalon Daniels	16–29, 165 yards, 1 INT
Kansas	Rushing	Jalon Daniels	16 carries, 36 yards, 1 touchdown, 1 TD
Kansas	Receiving	Kwamie Lassiter II	5 receptions, 66 yards

The Jayhawks struggled offensively yet again, with the majority of their offensive yards came from freshman quarterback Jalon Daniels, who accounted for 201 yards of the Jayhawks 240 yards. The struggles on offense led to defensive struggles as well as KU fell 22–55 extending their overall losing streak to 10 games and their losing streak against ranked teams to 40 games.

=== At No. 19 Oklahoma ===
Kansas at Oklahoma

Team	1	2	3	4	Total
Jayhawks	0	3	0	6	9
• No. 19 Sooners	14	17	10	21	62

- Date: November 7, 2020
- Location: Gaylord Family Oklahoma Memorial Stadium
  Norman, OK
- Game start: 2:35 p.m. CDT
- Elapsed time: 3:46
- Game attendance: 22,700
- Game weather: 75 °F (24 °C) • Weather: Sunny • Wind: SSE 14 MPH
- Referee: Kevin Mar
- TV announcers (ESPN): Anish Shroff (play-by-play, Tom Luginbill (analysts) & Kris Budden (sideline)

Scoring summary
1	12:01	OU	Spencer Rattler 20-yard pass to Austin Stogner (Gabe Brkic kick)	7–0 OU
1	1:26	OU	Rhamondre Stevenson 13-yard rush (Gabe Brkic kick)	14–0 OU
2	8:13	OU	Spencer Rattler 2-yard rush (Gabe Brkic kick)	21–0 OU
2	4:48	OU	Gabe Brkic 40-yard field goal	24–0 OU
2	1:26	OU	T. J. Pledger 4-yard rush (Gabe Brkic kick)	31–0 OU
2	0:00	KU	Jacob Borcila 32-yard field goal	31–3 OU
3	11:16	OU	Gabe Brkic 50-yard field goal	34–3 OU
3	8:59	OU	Rhamondre Stevenson 29-yard rush (Gabe Brkic kick)	41–3 OU
4	14:54	OU	Tanner Mordecai 14-yard pass to Marvin Mims (Gabe Brkic kick)	48–3 OU
4	11:21	OU	Marcus Major 3-yard rush (Gabe Brkic kick)	55–3 OU
4	7:50	OU	Chandler Morris 13-yard rush (Gabe Brkic kick)	62–3 OU
4	0:00	KU	Miles Kendrick 20-yard pass to Will Huggins	62–9 OU

Statistics	KU	OU
First downs	16	31
Total yards	246	540
Rushing yards	95	200
Passing yards	151	340
Turnovers	2	2
Time of possession	32:48	27:12

Team	Category	Player	Statistics
Kansas	Passing	Jalon Daniels	11/31, 115 yards, 2 INT
Kansas	Rushing	Daniel Hishaw Jr.	10 carries, 73 yards
Kansas	Receiving	Luke Grimm	4 receptions, 61 yards
Oklahoma	Passing	Spencer Rattler	15/27, 212 yards, TD, INT
Oklahoma	Rushing	Rhamondre Stevenson	11 carries, 104 yards, 2 TD
Oklahoma	Receiving	Austin Stogner	3 receptions, 75 yards, TD

=== TCU ===
TCU at Kansas

Team	1	2	3	4	Total
• Horned Frogs	24	14	7	14	59
Jayhawks	6	6	8	3	23

- Date: November 28, 2020
- Location: David Booth Kansas Memorial Stadium
  Lawrence, KS
- Game start: 7:05 p.m. CDT
- Elapsed time: 3:30
- Game attendance: None due to COVID-19
- Game weather: 46 °F (8 °C) • Weather: Clear • Wind: S 5 MPH
- Referee: Brad Van Vark
- Television network: FS1

Scoring summary
1	10:50	TCU	Griffin Kell 39-yard field goal	3–0 TCU
1	9:11	TCU	Pro Wells 46-yard pass from Max Duggan (Griffin Kell kick)	10–0 TCU
1	6:00	TCU	Carter Ware 26-yard pass from Max Duggan (Griffin Kell kick)	17–0 TCU
1	3:49	TCU	Derius Davis 37-yard punt return (Griffin Kell kick)	24–0 TCU
1	1:22	KU	Kwamie Lassiter II 48-yard pass from Jalon Daniels (Two-point run conversion failed)	24–6 TCU
2	8:56	TCU	Pro Wells 24-yard pass from Max Duggan (Griffin Kell kick)	31–6 TCU
2	1:06	TCU	Max Duggan 58-yard run (Griffin Kell kick)	38–6 TCU
2	0:20	KU	Luke Grimm 14-yard pass from Miles Kendrick (Two-point run conversion failed)	38–12 TCU
3	5:27	TCU	Darwin Barlow 1-yard run (Griffin Kell kick)	45–12 TCU
3	1:26	KU	Luke Grimm 21-yard pass from Miles Kendrick (Miles Kendrick pass to Takulve Williams for two-point conversion)	45–20 TCU
4	14:45	TCU	C. J. Ceasar II 30-yard interception return (Griffin Kell kick)	52–20 TCU
4	10:02	TCU	Dee Winters 2-yard fumble return (Griffin Kell kick)	59–20 TCU
4	4:25	KU	Jacob Borcila 48-yard field goal	59–23 TCU

Statistics	TCU	KU
First downs	16	18
Total yards	443	268
Rushing yards	337	41
Passing yards	106	227
Turnovers	0	2
Time of possession	25:56	34:04

Team	Category	Player	Statistics
TCU	Passing	Max Duggan	3/11, 96 yards, 3 TD
TCU	Rushing	Zach Evans	12 carries, 100 yards
TCU	Receiving	Pro Wells	2 receptions, 70 yards, 2 TD
Kansas	Passing	Miles Kendrick	11/18, 166 yards, 2 TD, INT
Kansas	Rushing	Amauri Pesek-Hickson	22 carries, 100 yards
Kansas	Receiving	Kwamie Lassiter II	7 receptions, 116 yards, TD

=== At Texas Tech ===
Kansas at Texas Tech

Team	1	2	3	4	Total
Jayhawks	0	3	3	7	13
• Red Raiders	10	0	3	3	16

- Date: December 5, 2020
- Location: Jones AT&T Stadium
  Lubbock, TX
- Game start: 11:05 a.m. CDT
- Elapsed time: 3:20
- Game attendance: 9,877
- Game weather: 44 °F (7 °C) • Weather: Cloudy • Wind: N 10 MPH
- Referee: David Alvarez
- TV announcers (FS2): Guy Haberman and Charles Arbuckle

Scoring summary
1	8:56	TTU	Jonathan Garibay 47-yard field goal	3–0 TTU
1	3:52	TTU	Myles Price 70-yard run (Jonathan Garibay kick)	10–0 TTU
2	0:00	KU	Jacob Borcila 42-yard field goal	10–3 TTU
3	6:59	TTU	Jonathan Garibay 21-yard field goal	13–3 TTU
3	0:27	KU	Jacob Borcila 29-yard field goal	13–6 TTU
4	10:46	KU	Daniel Hishaw Jr. 12-yard run (Jacob Borcila kick)	13–13 TIED
4	5:36	TTU	Jonathan Garibay 36-yard field goal	16–13 TTU

Statistics	KU	TTU
First downs	14	17
Total yards	214	410
Rushing yards	112	293
Passing yards	102	117
Turnovers	0	4
Time of possession	34:23	25:37

Team	Category	Player	Statistics
Kansas	Passing	Miles Kendrick	17/29, 102 yards
Kansas	Rushing	Daniel Hishaw Jr.	22 carries, 87 yards, TD
Kansas	Receiving	Luke Grimm	6 receptions, 41 yards
Texas Tech	Passing	Alan Bowman	15/26, 117 yards, INT
Texas Tech	Rushing	Xavier White	14 carries, 135 yards
Texas Tech	Receiving	Myles Price	2 receptions, 43 yards

== Coaching staff ==
Name	Position
Les Miles	Head coach
Brent Dearmon	Offensive coordinator
D.J. Eliot	Defensive coordinator/linebackers
Chidera Uzo-Diribe	Outside linebackers
Emmett Jones	Wide receivers/passing game coordinator
Joshua Eargle	Tight ends/recruiting coordinator
Jonathan Wallace	Running backs/special teams
Chevis Jackson	Defensive backs
Jordan Peterson	Safeties
Kwahn Drake	Defensive line/defensive run game coordinator
John Morookian	Offensive line
Travis Partridge	Offensive quality control
Ben Iannachionne	Director of football strength & conditioning
