= 2020 Iowa State Cyclones football team =

American college football season

2020 Iowa State Cyclones football

Fiesta Bowl champion

Big 12 Championship Game, L 21–27 vs. Oklahoma

Fiesta Bowl, W 34–17 vs. Oregon
- Conference: Big 12 Conference

Ranking
- Coaches: No. 9
- AP: No. 9
- Record: 9–3 (8–1 Big 12)
- Head coach: Matt Campbell (5th season)
- Offensive coordinator: Tom Manning (4th season)
- Offensive scheme: Pro spread
- Defensive coordinator: Jon Heacock (5th season)
- Base defense: 3-high safety
- Home stadium: Jack Trice Stadium

2020 Big 12 Conference football standings
	Conf.			Overall
Team	W		L	W		L
No. 9 Iowa State y	8	–	1	9	–	3
No. 6 Oklahoma y$	6	–	2	9	–	2
No. 20 Oklahoma State	6	–	3	8	–	3
No. 19 Texas	5	–	3	7	–	3
TCU	5	–	4	6	–	4
West Virginia	4	–	4	6	–	4
Kansas State	4	–	5	4	–	6
Texas Tech	3	–	6	4	–	6
Baylor	2	–	7	2	–	7
Kansas	0	–	8	0	–	9
Championship: Oklahoma 27, Iowa State 21
$ – Conference champion; y – Championship game participant; Rankings from AP Poll.

The 2020 Iowa State Cyclones football team represented Iowa State University as a member of Big 12 Conference during the 2020 NCAA Division I FBS football season. Led by fifth-year head coach Matt Campbell, the Cyclones compiled an overall record of 9–3 with a mark of 8–1 in conference play, placing first in the Big 12. Iowa State advanced to the Big 12 Championship Game. In their first conference title game appearance, the Cyclones lost to Oklahoma. Iowa State earned the program's first bid to a New Year's Six bowl game. The Cyclones defeated Oregon in the Fiesta Bowl. The team played their home games at Jack Trice Stadium in Ames, Iowa.

Breece Hall became the first unanimous All-American in school history.

== Schedule ==
Iowa State released its 2020 schedule on October 22, 2019. On July 9, 2020, it was announced that the Big Ten Conference would only play games against conference teams, leading to the cancellation of the September 12 game between Iowa State and Iowa. The Cyclones added Ball State to the schedule to replace in-state rival Iowa. On August 6, 2020, Iowa State's game against UNLV was canceled and rescheduled for the 2030 season. The Cyclones announced a reconfigured schedule on August 12, 2020, with the addition of Louisiana as their non-conference opponent.

Date	Time	Opponent	Rank	Site	TV	Result	Attendance
September 12	11:00 a.m.	Louisiana*	No. 23	Jack Trice Stadium; Ames, IA	ESPN	L 14–31	0
September 26	12:30 p.m.	at TCU		Amon G. Carter Stadium; Fort Worth, TX	FS1	W 37–34	11,852
October 3	6:30 p.m.	No. 18 Oklahoma		Jack Trice Stadium; Ames, IA	ABC	W 37–30	13,724
October 10	2:30 p.m.	Texas Tech^{†}	No. 24	Jack Trice Stadium; Ames, IA	ABC	W 31–15	13,502
October 24	2:30 p.m.	at No. 6 Oklahoma State	No. 17	Boone Pickens Stadium; Stillwater, OK	FOX	L 21–24	14,671
October 31	11:00 a.m.	at Kansas	No. 23	David Booth Kansas Memorial Stadium; Lawrence, KS	FS1	W 52–22	9,652
November 7	6:00 p.m.	Baylor	No. 17	Jack Trice Stadium; Ames, IA	FS1	W 38–31	13,535
November 21	3:00 p.m.	Kansas State	No. 17	Jack Trice Stadium; Ames, IA (rivalry)	FOX	W 45–0	0
November 27	11:00 a.m.	at No. 17 Texas	No. 13	Darrell K Royal–Texas Memorial Stadium; Austin, TX	ABC	W 23–20	16,555
December 5	2:30 p.m.	West Virginia	No. 9	Jack Trice Stadium; Ames, IA	ESPN	W 42–6	14,256
December 19	11:00 a.m.	vs. No. 10 Oklahoma	No. 6	AT&T Stadium; Arlington, TX (Big 12 Championship Game)	ABC	L 21–27	18,720
January 2	1:00 p.m.	vs. No. 25 Oregon*	No. 10	State Farm Stadium; Glendale, AZ (Fiesta Bowl)	ESPN	W 34–17	0
*Non-conference game; ^{†}Homecoming; Rankings from AP Poll and CFP Rankings after November 24 released prior to game; All times are in Central time

== Rankings ==
Ranking movements Legend: ██ Increase in ranking ██ Decrease in ranking — = Not ranked RV = Received votes
	Week																	
Poll	Pre	1	2	3	4	5	6	7	8	9	10	11	12	13	14	15	16	Final
AP	23		RV	—	—	24	20	17	23	17	17	17	15	12	10	8	12	9
Coaches	25		RV	—	—	24	20	18	22	17	16	16	15	12	11	8	12	9
CFP	Not released												13	9	7	6	10	Not released

== Preseason ==
=== Spring game ===
The Cyclones announced that they would cancel spring practice in March and April 2020 and would not hold a spring game due to the COVID-19 pandemic.

=== Seating plans ===
On May 26, 2020, Iowa State athletic director Jamie Pollard announced that single-game tickets would not be sold for Iowa State football games for the 2020 season and that only the 30,000 season ticket holders would be permitted to attend games, as a result of the pandemic.

=== Big 12 media days ===
The Big 12 media days were held on July 21–22, 2020 in a virtual format due to the pandemic. In the Big 12 preseason media poll, Iowa State was picked to finish fourth in the conference.

== Game summaries ==
=== Vs. Louisiana ===
Louisiana Ragin' Cajuns (0–0) vs. #23 Iowa State Cyclones (0–0)

Quarter	1	2	3	4	Total
Louisiana	0	10	7	14	31
No. 23 Iowa State	0	14	0	0	14

at Jack Trice Stadium • Ames, IA

- Date: Saturday, September 12, 2020
- Game time: 11:00 a.m. CDT
- Game weather: Cloudy • Temperature: 67 °F (19 °C) • Wind: Light
- Game attendance: 0
- Referee: Tuta Salaam
- TV announcers (ESPN): Tom Hart (play–by–play), Mike Golic (analyst), and Cole Cubelic (sideline reporter)

Game information

First Quarter

No scoring plays

Second Quarter

- (4:28) ISU – Kene Nwangwu 1 Yd Run (Connor Assalley Kick) (Drive: 8 plays, 49 yards, 3:24; ISU 7–0)
- (4:14) LA – Chris Smith 95 Yd Kickoff Return (Nate Snyder Kick) (Tied 7–7)
- (1:17) ISU – Breece Hall 11 Yd Run (Connor Assalley Kick) (Drive: 7 plays, 69 yards, 2:57; ISU 14–7)
- (0:00) LA – Nate Snyder 30 Yd Field Goal (Drive: 9 plays, 61 yards, 1:17; ISU 14–10)

Third Quarter

- (2:02) LA – Peter LeBlanc 78 Yd pass from Levi Lewis (Kenneth Almendares Kick) (Drive: 1 play, 78 yards, 0:12; LA 17–14)

Fourth Quarter

- (13:58) LA – Eric Garror 83 Yd Punt Return (Kenneth Almendares Kick) (LA 24–14)
- (0:10) LA – Trey Ragas 2 Yd Run (Kenneth Almendares Kick)) (Drive: 11 plays, 56 yards, 7:01; LA 31–14)

Statistics	LA	ISU
First downs	14	18
Total yards	272	303
Rushes/yards	35–118	36–158
Passing yards	154	145
Passing: Comp–Att–Int	13–21–0	16–35–1
Time of possession	27:41	32:19

Team	Category	Player	Statistics
Louisiana	Passing	Levi Lewis	13–21, 154 yds, 1 TD
Louisiana	Rushing	Trey Ragas	14 CAR, 49 yds, 1 TD
Louisiana	Receiving	Peter LeBlanc	5 REC, 82 yds, 1 TD
Iowa State	Passing	Brock Purdy	16–35, 145 yds, 1 INT
Iowa State	Rushing	Breece Hall	20 CAR, 103 yds, 1 TD
Iowa State	Receiving	Xavier Hutchinson	4 REC, 43 yds

=== At TCU ===
Iowa State Cyclones (0–1) vs. TCU Horned Frogs (0–0)

Quarter	1	2	3	4	Total
Iowa State	0	16	7	14	37
TCU	0	7	14	13	34

at Amon G. Carter Stadium • Fort Worth, TX

- Date: Saturday, September 26, 2020
- Game time: 12:30 p.m. CDT
- Game weather: Sunny • Temperature: 77 °F (25 °C)
- Game attendance: 11,852
- Referee: Brandon Cruse
- TV announcers (FS1): Joe Davis, Mark Helfrich

Game information

First Quarter

Second Quarter

- (9:50) ISU – Breece Hall 75 Yd Run (Connor Assalley Kick) (Drive: 3 plays, 87 yards, 1:20; ISU 7–0)
- (6:37) TCU – Quentin Johnston 37 Yd pass from Matthew Downing (Griffin Kell Kick) (Drive: 9 plays, 76 yards, 3:13; Tied 7–7)
- (1:41) ISU – Connor Assalley 24 Yd Field Goal (Drive: 9 plays, 68 yards, 4:56; ISU 10–7)
- (0:53) ISU – Darren Wilson Jr. 17 Yd pass from Brock Purdy (Connor Assalley PAT failed) (Drive: 2 plays, 17 yards, 0:11; ISU 16–7)

Third Quarter

- (13:50) TCU – La'Kendrick Van Zandt 24 Yd Fumble Return (Griffin Kell Kick) ( ISU 16–14)
- (12:39) ISU – Kene Nwangwu 49 Yd Run (Connor Assalley Kick) (Drive: 3 plays, 75 yards, 1:11; ISU 23–14)
- (0:23) TCU – Taye Barber 27 Yd pass from Max Duggan (Griffin Kell Kick) (Drive: 2 plays, 35 yards, 0:35; ISU 23–21)

Fourth Quarter

- (12:52) ISU – Breece Hall 1 Yd Run (Connor Assalley Kick) (Drive: 6 plays, 75 yards, 2:31; ISU 30–21)
- (6:51) TCU – Artayvious Lynn 48 Yd pass from Max Duggan (Griffin Kell Kick) (Drive: 3 plays, 62 yards, 0:55; ISU 30–28)
- (2:54) ISU – Breece Hall 32 Yd Run (Connor Assalley Kick) (Drive: 3 plays, 39 yards, 1:02; ISU 37–28)
- (0:00) TCU – Blair Conwright 31 Yd pass from Max Duggan (Drive: 13 plays, 92 yards, 2:54; ISU 37–34)

Statistics	ISU	TCU
First downs	14	27
Total yards	423	498
Rushes/yards	28–212	44–99
Passing yards	211	399
Passing: Comp–Att–Int	18–23–0	27–40–1
Time of possession	26:58	33:02

Team	Category	Player	Statistics
Iowa State	Passing	Brock Purdy	18–23, 211 yds, TD
Iowa State	Rushing	Breece Hall	18 CAR, 154 yds, 3 TD
Iowa State	Receiving	Landen Akers	2 REC, 60 yds
TCU	Passing	Max Duggan	16–19, 241 yds, 3 TD, INT
TCU	Rushing	Emari Demercado	8 CAR, 39 yds
TCU	Receiving	Taye Barber	5 REC, 82 yds, TD

=== Vs. No. 18 Oklahoma ===
#18 Oklahoma Sooners (1–1) vs. Iowa State Cyclones (1–1)

Quarter	1	2	3	4	Total
#18 Oklahoma	10	7	3	10	30
Iowa State	3	10	10	14	37

at Jack Trice Stadium • Ames, IA

- Date: Saturday, October 3, 2020
- Game time: 6:30 p.m. CDT
- Game weather: Broken clouds • Temperature: 55 °F (13 °C)
- Game attendance: 13,724
- Referee: Michael Vandervelde
- TV announcers (ABC): Sean McDonough (play-by-play), Todd Blackledge (analyst), Todd McShay (field analyst), Molly McGrath (sideline)

Game information

First Quarter

- (11:36) OKLA – Gabe Brkic 18 yard field goal (Drive: 7 plays, 74 yards, 3:24; OU 3–0)
- (08:36) ISU – Connor Assalley 35 yard field goal (Drive: 9 plays, 57 yards, 2:58; Tied (3–3)
- (3:59) OKLA – Spencer Rattler 5 yard rush, Gabe Brkic kick (Drive: 10 plays, 85 yards,4:33; OU 10–3)

Second Quarter

- (14:45) ISU – Connor Assalley 26 yard field goal (Drive: 11 plays, 63 yards, 4:08; (OU 10–6)
- (11:49) OKLA – Spencer Rattler 4 yard pass to Jeremiah Hall, Gabe Brkic kick (Drive: 7 plays, 67 yards, 2:51; OU 17–6)
- (3:53) ISU – Breece Hall 2 yard rush, Connor Assalley kick (Drive: 6 plays, 85 yards, 3:44; OU 17–13)

Third Quarter

- (8:19) ISU – Connor Assalley 32 yard field goal (Drive: 11 plays, 58 yards,6:32; OU 17–16)
- (2:01) OKLA – Gabe Brkic 33 yard field goal (Drive: 11 plays, 49 yards, 6:01; OU 20–16)
- (1:18) ISU – Brock Purdy 65 yard pass to Xavier Hutchinson, Connor Assalley kick (Drive: 3 plays, 75 yards, 0:43; ISU 23–20)

Fourth Quarter

- (12:48) OKLA – Gabe Brkic 51 yard field goal (Drive: 9 plays, 41 yards, 3:30; Tied 23–23)
- (8:17) OKLA – Spencer Rattler 3 yard pass to Jeremiah Hall, Gabe Brkic kick (Drive: 4 plays, 39 yards, 1:51; OU 30–23)
- (7:26) ISU – Brock Purdy 2 yard rush, Connor Assalley kick (Drive: 2 plays, 13 yards, 0:38; Tied 30–30)
- (4:06) ISU – Breece Hall 8 yard rush, Connor Assalley kick (Drive: 4 plays, 55 yards, 1:56; ISU 37–30)

Statistics	OKLA	ISU
First downs	22	23
Total yards	414	417
Rushes/yards	33–114	31–135
Passing yards	300	282
Passing: Comp–Att–Int	25–36–1	13–25–0
Time of possession	33:34	26:26

Team	Category	Player	Statistics
Oklahoma	Passing	Spencer Rattler	25–36, 300 yds, 2 TD, INT
Oklahoma	Rushing	Seth McGowan	12 car, 47 yds
Oklahoma	Receiving	Austin Stogner	5 car, 74 yds
Iowa State	Passing	Brock Purdy	12–24, 254 yds, TD
Iowa State	Rushing	Breece Hall	28 car, 139 yds, 2 TD
Iowa State	Receiving	Xavier Hutchinson	3 rec, 83 yds, TD

=== Vs. Texas Tech ===
Texas Tech Red Raiders (1–2) vs. #24 Iowa State Cyclones (2–1)

Quarter	1	2	3	4	Total
Texas Tech	7	0	0	8	15
No. 24 Iowa State	7	14	7	3	31

at Jack Trice Stadium • Ames, IA

- Date: Saturday, October 10, 2020
- Game time: 2:30 p.m. CDT
- Game weather: Clear • Temperature: 75 °F (24 °C) • Wind: NE 5-10 MPH
- Game attendance: 13,502
- Referee: Kevin Hassell
- TV announcers (ABC): Mark Jones, Dusty Dvoracek

Game information

First Quarter

- (8:00) TT – Zech McPhearson 90 Yd Return of Blocked Field Goal (Trey Wolff Kick) (TT 7–0)
- (4:31) ISU – Breece Hall 11 Yd Run (Connor Assalley Kick) (Drive: 8 plays, 68 yards, 3:22; Tied 7–7)

Second Quarter

- (14:23) ISU – Chase Allen 2 Yd pass from Brock Purdy (Connor Assalley Kick) (Drive: 9 plays, 62 yards, 3:59; ISU 14–7)
- (5:31) ISU – Breece Hall 1 Yd Run (Connor Assalley Kick) (Drive: 13 plays, 80 yards, 6:09; ISU 21–7)

Third Quarter

- (3:06) ISU – Charlie Kolar 13 Yd pass from Brock Purdy (Connor Assalley Kick) (Drive: 12 plays, 70 yards, 5:17; ISU 28–7)

Fourth Quarter

- (12:07) ISU – Connor Assalley 26 Yd Field Goal (Drive: 11 plays, 67 yards, 4:23; ISU 31–7)
- (4:54) TT – Erik Ezukanma 18 Yd pass from Henry Colombi (Xavier White Run for Two-Point Conversion) (Drive: 12 plays, 88 yards, 3:41; ISU 31–15)

Statistics	TTU	ISU
First downs	15	29
Total yards	270	516
Rushes/yards	22–58	43–214
Passing yards	212	302
Passing: Comp–Att–Int	23–34–0	32–43–0
Time of possession	19:09	40:41

Team	Category	Player	Statistics
Texas Tech	Passing	Henry Colombi	10–12, 115 yds, TD
Texas Tech	Rushing	Xavier White	7 car, 21 yds
Texas Tech	Receiving	Erik Ezukanma	5 rec, 61 yds, TD
Iowa State	Passing	Brock Purdy	32–43, 302 yds, 2 TD
Iowa State	Rushing	Breece Hall	27 car, 135 yds, 2 TD
Iowa State	Receiving	Xavier Hutchinson	9 rec, 77 yds

=== At No. 6 Oklahoma State ===
#17 Iowa State Cyclones (3–1) vs. #6 Oklahoma State Cowboys (3–0)

Quarter	1	2	3	4	Total
No. 17 Iowa State	7	0	7	7	21
No. 6 Oklahoma State	7	7	7	3	24

at Boone Pickens Stadium • Stillwater, OK

- Date: Saturday, October 24, 2020
- Game time: 2:30 p.m. CDT
- Game weather: Cloudy • Temperature: 54°F
- Game attendance: 14,671
- Referee: Tuta Salaam
- TV announcers (FOX): Tim Brando, Spencer Tillman

Game information

First Quarter

- (6:57) ISU – Brock Purdy 11 Yd Run (Connor Assalley Kick) (Drive: 3 plays, 26 yards, 1:52; ISU 7–0)
- (0:55) OSU – Jelani Woods 34 Yd pass from Spencer Sanders (Alex Hale Kick) (Drive: 3 plays, 69 yards, 0:52; Tied 7–7)

Second Quarter

- (09:50) OSU – Chuba Hubbard 32 Yd Run (Alex Hale Kick) (Drive: 12 plays, 79 yards, 4:17; OSU 7–14)

Third Quarter

- (10:12) ISU – Breece Hall 66 Yd Run (Connor Assalley Kick) (Drive: 4 plays, 74 yards, 1:59; Tied 14–14)
- (08:44) OSU – Spencer Sanders 14 Yd Run (Alex Hale Kick) (Drive: 4 plays, 67 yards, 1:28; OSU 14–21)

Fourth Quarter

- (11:27) OSU – Alex Hale 31 Yd Field Goal (6 plays, 32 yards, 1:28; OSU 14–24)
- (0:49) ISU – Xavier Hutchinson 20 Yd pass from Brock Purdy (Connor Assalley Kick) (10 plays, 83 yards, 2:34; OSU 21–24)

Statistics	ISU	OKST
First downs	18	24
Total yards	389	461
Rushes/yards	227	226
Passing yards	162	235
Passing: Comp–Att–Int	19–34–1	20–29–2
Time of possession	29:56	30:04

Team	Category	Player	Statistics
Iowa State	Passing	Brock Purdy	19–34, 162 YDS, 1 TD, 1 INT
Iowa State	Rushing	Breece Hall	20 CAR, 185 YDS, 1 TD
Iowa State	Receiving	Xavier Hutchinson	8 REC, 68 YDS, 1 TD
Oklahoma State	Passing	Spencer Sanders	20–29, 235 YDS, 1 TD, 2 INT
Oklahoma State	Rushing	Chuba Hubbard	25 CAR, 139 YDS, 1 TD
Oklahoma State	Receiving	Tylan Wallace	5 REC, 76 YDS

=== At Kansas ===
#23 Iowa State Cyclones (3–2) vs. Kansas Jayhawks (0–5)

Quarter	1	2	3	4	Total
#23 Iowa State	13	7	15	17	52
Kansas	0	7	7	8	22

at David Booth Kansas Memorial Stadium • Lawrence, KS

- Date: Saturday, October 31, 2020
- Game time: 11:00 a.m. CDT
- Game weather: Clear • Temperature: 57 °F (14 °C) • Wind: SSW 21 miles per hour (34 km/h)
- Game attendance: 9,652
- Referee: Brad Van Vark
- TV announcers (FS1): Eric Collins and Ben Leber

Game information

First Quarter

- (10:46) ISU – Kene Nwangwu 11 Yd Run (Connor Assalley Kick) (Drive: 6 plays, 80 yards, 2:29; ISU 7–0)
- (8:07) ISU – Brock Purdy 1 Yd Run (Connor Assalley Kick failed) (Drive: 3 plays, 35 yards, 1:13; ISU 13–0)

Second Quarter

- (9:01) KU – Daniel Hishaw 5 Yd Run (Jacob Borcila Kick) (Drive: 7 plays, 59 yards, 3:11; ISU 13–7)
- (4:00) ISU – Charlie Kolar 3 Yd pass from Brock Purdy (Connor Assalley Kick) (Drive: 13 plays, 64 yards, 5:00; ISU 20–7)

Third Quarter

- (7:27) ISU – Xavier Hutchinson 36 Yd pass from Brock Purdy (Connor Assalley Kick) (Drive: 7 plays, 62 yards, 3:46; ISU 27–7)
- (7:12) KU – Kenny Logan 100 yd kickoff return (Jacob Borcila Kick) (ISU 27–14)
- (3:14) ISU – Breece Hall 7 Yd Run (Brock Purdy Pass to Charlie Kolar for Two-Point Conversion) (Drive: 7 plays, 77 yards, 3:49; ISU 35–14)

Fourth Quarter

- (11:02) ISU – Connor Assalley 40 Yd Field Goal (7 plays, 25 yards, 1:53; ISU 38–14)
- (7:34) KU – Jalon Daniels 12 Yd Run Andrew Parchment Pass to Kwamie Lassiter II for Two-Point Conversion) (Drive: 9 plays, 63 yards, 3:17; ISU 38–22)
- (5:05) ISU – Breece Hall 58 Yd Run (Connor Assalley Kick) (Drive: 1 plays, 58 yards, 0:11; ISU 45–22)
- (2:14) ISU – Joe Scates 30 Yd pass from Hunter Dekkers (Connor Assalley Kick) (Drive: 2 plays, 55 yards, 0:37; ISU 52–22)

Statistics	ISU	KAN
First downs	26	15
Total yards	552	240
Rushes/yards	35–258	34–73
Passing yards	294	167
Passing: Comp–Att–Int	25–36–1	18–33–1
Time of possession	31:13	28:47

Team	Category	Player	Statistics
Iowa State	Passing	Brock Purdy	23–34, 239 YDS, 2 TD, 1 INT
Iowa State	Rushing	Breece Hall	21 CAR, 185 YDS, 2 TD
Iowa State	Receiving	Xavier Hutchinson	5 REC, 87 YDS, 1 TD
Kansas	Passing	Jalon Daniels	16–29, 165 YDS, 1 INT
Kansas	Rushing	Jalon Daniels	16 CAR, 36 YDS, 1 TD
Kansas	Receiving	Kwamie Lassiter II	5 REC, 66 YDS

=== Vs. Baylor ===
Baylor Bears (1–3) vs. #17 Iowa State Cyclones (4–2)

Quarter	1	2	3	4	Total
Baylor	14	7	3	7	31
#17 Iowa State	0	10	21	7	38

at Jack Trice Stadium • Ames, IA

- Date: Saturday, November 7, 2020
- Game time: 6:00 p.m. CST
- Game weather: Clear • Temperature: 66°F
- Game attendance: 13,535
- Referee: Scott Campbell
- TV announcers (FS1): Brian Custer and Robert Smith

Game information

First Quarter

- (11:07) BU – R.J. Sneed 9 Yd pass from Charlie Brewer (John Mayers Kick) (Drive: 6 plays, 89 yards, 2:45; BU 7–0)
- (2:31) BU – Drake Dabney 9 Yd pass from Charlie Brewer (John Mayers Kick) (Drive: 6 plays, 36 yards, 2:46; BU 14–0)

Second Quarter

- (12:52) ISU – Breece Hall 14 Yd Run (Connor Assalley Kick) (Drive: 5 plays, 35 yards, 2:37; BU 14–7)
- (7:21) BU – Jalen Pitre 30 Yd Interception Return (John Mayers Kick) (BU 21–7)
- (2:04) ISU – Connor Assalley 42 Yd Field Goal (9 plays, 40 yards, 5:17; BU 21–10)

Third Quarter

- (12:06) BU – John Mayers 36 Yd Field Goal (4 plays, 2 yards, 1:18; BU 24–10)
- (11:11) ISU – Charlie Kolar 22 Yd pass from Brock Purdy (Connor Assalley Kick) (Drive: 2 plays, 33 yards, 0:44; BU 24–17)
- (7:37) ISU – Breece Hall 17 Yd Run (Connor Assalley Kick) (Drive: 5 plays, 80 yards, 2:31; Tied 24–24)
- (0:23) ISU – Chase Allen 10 Yd pass from Brock Purdy (Connor Assalley Kick) (Drive: 11 plays, 71 yards, 5:17; ISU 31–24)

Fourth Quarter

- (10:46) ISU – Breece Hall 6 Yd pass from Brock Purdy (Connor Assalley Kick) (3 plays, 17 yards, 1:26; ISU 38–24)
- (8:43) BU – Trestan Ebner 58 Yd pass from Charlie Brewer (John Mayers Kick) (6 plays, 80 yards, 1:56; ISU 38–31)

Statistics	BAY	ISU
First downs	17	23
Total yards	366	362
Rushes/yards	27–71	41–198
Passing yards	295	164
Passing: Comp–Att–Int	22–33–02	15–24–3
Time of possession	26:55	33:05

Team	Category	Player	Statistics
Baylor	Passing	Charlie Brewer	22–33, 295 yds, 3 TD, 2 INT
Baylor	Rushing	Charlie Brewer	10 car, 29 yds
Baylor	Receiving	R.J. Sneed	6 rec, 93 yds, TD
Iowa State	Passing	Brock Purdy	32–43, 302 yds, 2 TD
Iowa State	Rushing	Breece Hall	27 car, 135 yds, 2 TD
Iowa State	Receiving	Charlie Kolar	3 rec, 45 yds, TD

=== Vs. Kansas State ===
Kansas State Wildcats (4–3) vs. #17 Iowa State Cyclones (5–2)

Quarter	1	2	3	4	Total
Kansas State	0	0	0	0	0
No. 17 Iowa State	7	28	3	7	45

at Jack Trice Stadium • Ames, IA

- Date: Saturday, November 21, 2020
- Game time: 3:00 p.m. CST
- Game weather: Overcast • Temperature: 41°F
- Game attendance: 0
- Referee: Brandon Cruse
- TV announcers (FOX): Tim Brando, Spencer Tillman

Game information

First Quarter

- (12:00) ISU – Joe Scates 33 Yd pass from Brock Purdy (Connor Assalley Kick) (Drive: 6 plays, 75 yards, 3:00; ISU 7–0)

Second Quarter

- (14:56) ISU – Charlie Kolar 6 Yd pass from Brock Purdy (Connor Assalley Kick) (Drive: 11 plays, 97 yards, 6:27; ISU 14–0)
- (6:38) ISU – Xavier Hutchinson 21 Yd pass from Brock Purdy (Connor Assalley Kick) (Drive: 6 plays, 46 yards, 3:18; ISU 21–0)
- (4:30) ISU – Breece Hall 33 Yd Run (Connor Assalley Kick) (Drive: 3 plays, 88 yards, 1:03; ISU 28–0)
- (1:01) ISU – Breece Hall 21 Yd Run (Connor Assalley Kick) (Drive: 6 plays, 38 yards, 3:16; ISU 35–0)

Third Quarter

- (1:01) ISU – Connor Assalley 32 Yd Field Goal (Drive: 6 plays, 37 yards, 2:12; ISU 38–0)

Fourth Quarter

- (10:55) ISU – Hunter Dekkers 12 Yd Run (Connor Assalley Kick) (Drive: 3 plays, 32 yards, 0:53; ISU 45–0)

Statistics	KSU	ISU
First downs	9	26
Total yards	149	539
Rushes/yards	28–73	44–240
Passing yards	76	299
Passing: Comp–Att–Int	9–19–1	19–25–0
Time of possession	23:05	36:55

Team	Category	Player	Statistics
Kansas State	Passing	Nick Ast	6–10, 44 yds
Kansas State	Rushing	Deuce Vaughn	7 car, 44 yds
Kansas State	Receiving	Chabastin Taylor	2 rec, 37 yds
Iowa State	Passing	Brock Purdy	16–20, 236 yds, 3 TD
Iowa State	Rushing	Breece Hall	15 car, 135 yds, 2 TD
Iowa State	Receiving	Xavier Hutchinson	6 rec, 111 yds, TD

=== At No. 17 Texas ===
#13 Iowa State Cyclones (6–2) vs. #17 Texas Longhorns (5–2)

Quarter	1	2	3	4	Total
No. 13 Iowa State	7	3	3	10	23
No. 17 Texas	13	0	7	0	20

at Darrell K Royal–Texas Memorial Stadium • Austin, TX

- Date: Saturday, November 28, 2020
- Game time: 11 a.m. CST
- Game weather: Rainy • Temperature: 69°F
- Game attendance: 16,555
- Referee: David Alvarez
- TV announcers (ABC): Matt Barrie, Mike Golic, Jr.

Game information

First Quarter

- (11:29) UT – Cameron Dicker 21 Yd Field Goal (Drive: 8 plays, 72 yards, 3:31; UT 3–0)
- (7:39) UT – Sam Ehlinger 17 Yd Run (Cameron Dicker Kick) (Drive: 6 plays, 63 yards, 2:19; UT 10–0)
- (4:45) ISU – Sean Shaw Jr. 35 Yd pass from Brock Purdy (Connor Assalley Kick) (Drive: 6 plays, 75 yards, 2:54; UT 10–7)
- (0:21) UT – Cameron Dicker 42 Yd Field Goal (Drive: 6 plays, 32 yards, 1:52; UT 13–7)

Second Quarter

- (7:21) ISU – Connor Assalley 26 Yd Field Goal (Drive: 15 plays, 67 yards, 8:00; UT 13–10)

Third Quarter

- (7:30) UT – Jared Wiley 7 Yd pass from Sam Ehlinger (Cameron Dicker Kick) (Drive: 8 plays, 89 yards, 3:46; UT 20–10)
- (2:54) ISU – Connor Assalley 29 Yd Field Goal (Drive: 9 plays, 63 yards, 4:36; UT 20–13)

Fourth Quarter

- (14:48) ISU – Connor Assalley 38 Yd Field Goal (Drive: 5 plays, 37 yards, 1:49; UT 20–16)
- (1:25) ISU – Breece Hall 3 Yd Run (Connor Assalley Kick) (Drive: 5 plays, 69 yards, 1:44; ISU 23–20)

Statistics	ISU	TEX
First downs	25	21
Total yards	433	448
Rushes/yards	33-121	35-145
Passing yards	312	303
Passing: Comp–Att–Int	25–36–0	18–30–0
Time of possession	32:57	27:03

Team	Category	Player	Statistics
Iowa State	Passing	Brock Purdy	25–36, 312 YDS, TD
Iowa State	Rushing	Breece Hall	20 CAR, 91 YDS, TD
Iowa State	Receiving	Charlie Kolar	6 REC, 131 YDS
Texas	Passing	Sam Ehlinger	17–29, 298 YDS, TD
Texas	Rushing	Sam Ehlinger	15 CAR, 65 YDS, TD
Texas	Receiving	Brennan Eagles	5 REC, 142 YDS

=== Vs. West Virginia ===
West Virginia Mountaineers (5–3) vs. #9 Iowa State Cyclones (7–2)

Quarter	1	2	3	4	Total
West Virginia	0	0	0	6	6
No. 9 Iowa State	7	14	14	7	42

at Jack Trice Stadium • Ames, IA

- Date: Saturday, December 5, 2020
- Game time: 2:30 p.m. CST
- Game weather: Clear • Temperature: 49
- Game attendance: 14,256
- Referee: Kevin Hassell
- TV announcers (ESPN): Dave Pasch, Mike Golic

Game information

First Quarter

- (5:51) ISU – Breece Hall 23 Yd Run (Connor Assalley Kick) (10 plays, 80 yards, 4:49; ISU 7–0)

Second Quarter

- (14:17) ISU – Brock Purdy 10 Yd Run (Connor Assalley Kick) (11 plays, 44 yards, 4:31; ISU 14–0)
- (2:49) ISU – Landen Akers 2 Yd pass from Brock Purdy (Connor Assalley Kick (12 plays, 76 yards, 5:07; ISU 21–0)

Third Quarter

- (3:10) ISU – Charlie Kolar 16 Yd pass from Brock Purdy (Connor Assalley Kick) (5 plays, 73 yards, 1:40; ISU 28–0)
- (0:07) ISU – Kene Nwangwu 47 Yd Run (Connor Assalley Kick (4 plays, 78 yards, 1:51; ISU 35–0)

Fourth Quarter

- (12:00) WVU – Tyler Sumpter 32 Yd Field Goal (8 plays, 67 yards, 3:07; ISU 35–3)
- (7:07) ISU – Breece Hall 28 Yd pass from Brock Purdy (Connor Assalley Kick) (9 plays, 73 yards, 4:53; ISU 42–3)
- (2:46) WVU – Tyler Sumpter 32 Yd Field Goal (13 plays, 49 yards, 4:21; ISU 42–6)

Statistics	WVU	ISU
First downs	16	26
Total yards	263	483
Rushes/yards	25-54	44-236
Passing yards	209	247
Passing: Comp–Att–Int	21-41-0	20-23-0
Time of possession	28:09	31:51

Team	Category	Player	Statistics
West Virginia	Passing	Jarret Doege	21–44, 209 YDS
West Virginia	Rushing	Leddie Brown	14 CAR, 48 YDS
West Virginia	Receiving	Sean Ryan	5 REC, 79 YDS
Iowa State	Passing	Brock Purdy	20–23, 247 YDS, 3 TD
Iowa State	Rushing	Breece Hall	22 CAR, 97 YDS, TD
Iowa State	Receiving	Xavier Hutchinson	8 REC, 89 YDS

=== Vs. No. 10 Oklahoma—Big 12 Championship game ===
#10 Oklahoma Sooners (7–2) vs. #6 Iowa State Cyclones (8–2)

Quarter	1	2	3	4	Total
No. 10 Oklahoma	7	17	0	3	27
No. 6 Iowa State	0	7	7	7	21

at AT&T Stadium • Arlington, TX

- Date: Saturday, December 19, 2020
- Game time: 11:00 a.m. CDT
- Game weather: Indoors
- Game attendance: 18,720
- Referee: David Alvarez
- TV announcers (ABC): Sean McDonough (play-by-play), Todd Blackledge (analyst), Todd McShay (reporter) and Allison Williams (reporter)

Game information

First Quarter

- (12:05) OU – Chandler Morris 2 Yd Run (Gabe Brkic Kick) (7 plays, 65 yards, 2:55; OU 7–0)

Second Quarter

- (14:52) OU – Marvin Mims 45 Yd pass from Spencer Rattler (Gabe Brkic Kick) (5 plays, 74 yards, 1:35; OU 14–0)
- (8:35) OU – Gabe Brkic 54 Yd Field Goal (4 plays, 3 yards, 1:20; OU 17–0)
- (1:24) ISU – Charlie Kolar 10 Yd pass from Brock Purdy (Connor Assalley Kick) (6 plays, 66 yards, 2:18; OU 17–7)
- (0:37) OU – Spencer Rattler 9 Yd Run (Gabe Brkic Kick) (4 plays, 45 yards, 0:57; OU 24–7)

Third Quarter

- (0:12) ISU – Breece Hall 1 Yd Run (Connor Assalley Kick) (9 plays, 90 yards, 4:29; OU 24–14)

Fourth Quarter

- (5:15) ISU – Breece Hall 3 Yd Run (Connor Assalley Kick) (12 plays, 87 yards, 4:20; OU 24–21)
- (2:01) OU – Gabe Brkic 32 Yd Field Goal (9 plays, 41 yards, 3:14; OU 27–21)

Statistics	OU	ISU
First downs	20	20
Total yards	392	435
Rushes/yards	120	113
Passing yards	272	322
Passing: Comp–Att–Int	22-34-0	27-40-3
Time of possession	27:48	32:12

Team	Category	Player	Statistics
Oklahoma	Passing	Spencer Rattler	22–27, 272 YDS, 1 TD
Oklahoma	Rushing	Rhamondre Stevenson	18 CAR, 97 YDS
Oklahoma	Receiving	Marvin Mims	7 REC, 101 YDS, 1 TD
Iowa State	Passing	Brock Purdy	27–40, 322 YDS, 1 TD, 3 INT
Iowa State	Rushing	Breece Hall	23 CAR, 79 YDS, 2 TD
Iowa State	Receiving	Xavier Hutchinson	10 REC, 114 YDS

=== Vs. No. 25 Oregon—Fiesta Bowl ===
#25 Oregon Ducks (4–2) vs. #10 Iowa State Cyclones (8–3)

Quarter	1	2	3	4	Total
No. 25 Oregon	7	10	0	0	17
No. 10 Iowa State	7	21	3	3	34

at State Farm Stadium • Glendale, AZ

- Date: Saturday, December 19, 2020
- Game time: 3:00 p.m. CDT
- Game weather: Light Clouds • Temperature: 60 (roof open)
- Game attendance: 0 (family only)
- Referee: David Smith
- TV announcers (ESPN): Dave Pasch, Mike Golic

Game information

First Quarter

- (7:24) ISU – Breece Hall 1 Yd Run (Connor Assaley Kick) (15 plays, 75 yards, 7:36; ISU 7–0)
- (4:14) UO – Anthony Brown 6 Yd Run (Henry Katleman Kick) (7 plays, 73 yards, 3:10; Tied 7–7)

Second Quarter

- (10:58) ISU – Charlie Kolar 14 Yd pass from Brock Purdy (Connor Assalley Kick) (14 plays, 69 yards, 8:16; ISU 14–7)
- (3:17) UO – Anthony Brown 16 Yd Run (Henry Katleman Kick) (9 plays, 98 yards, 3:21; Tied 14–14)
- (1:44) ISU – Brock Purdy 1 Yd Run (Connor Assaley Kick) (6 plays, 75 yards, 1:33; ISU 21–14)
- (1:27) ISU – Breece Hall 1 Yd Run (Connor Assaley Kick) (3 plays, 27 yards, 0:17; ISU 28–14)
- (0:13) UO – Henry Katleman 47 Yd Field Goal (8 plays, 48 yards, 1:14; ISU 28–17)

Third Quarter

- (6:30) ISU – Connor Assalley 33 Yd Field Goal (4 plays, -2 yards, 1:33; ISU 31–17)

Fourth Quarter

- (6:11) ISU – Connor Assalley 39 Yd Field Goal (13 plays, 55 yards, 7:33; ISU 34–17)

Statistics	UO	ISU
First downs	17	25
Total yards	312	384
Rushes/yards	86	228
Passing yards	226	156
Passing: Comp–Att–Int	21-28-1	20-29-0
Time of possession	17:12	42:48

Team	Category	Player	Statistics
Oregon	Passing	Anthony Brown	12–19, 147 YDS
Oregon	Rushing	Travis Dye	8 CAR, 52 YDS
Oregon	Receiving	Johnny Johnson III	4 REC, 41 YDS
Iowa State	Passing	Brock Purdy	20–29, 156 YDS, 1 TD
Iowa State	Rushing	Breece Hall	34 CAR, 136 YDS, 2 TD
Iowa State	Receiving	Charlie Kolar	5 REC, 53 YDS, 1 TD

== Personnel ==
=== Coaching staff ===
Name	Position	Year at Iowa State	Previous job
Matt Campbell	Head coach	5th	Toledo (HC)
Jon Heacock	DC	5th	Toledo (DC)
Tom Manning	OC/TE	4th	Indianapolis Colts (TE)
Nathan Scheelhaase	WR	3rd	Illinois (offensive analyst)
Joel Gordon	Passing game coordinator/QB	5th	Ferrum (OC)
D.K. McDonald	Defensive passing game coordinator/SAF	5th	Toledo (CB)
Eli Rasheed	DL	5th	Toledo (DL)
Tyson Veidt	AHC/LB	5th	Toledo (LB)
Jeff Myers	OL	5th	Toledo (graduate assistant)
Matt Caponi	CB	2nd	West Virginia (DB)
Mick McCall	RB	1st	Northwestern (OC/QB)

=== Roster ===
2020 Iowa State Cyclones Football
Quarterback: 10 Blake Clark - (redshirt) Sophomore (6'2", 199); 12 Hunter Dekkers - Freshman (6’3”, 234); 14 Aidan Bouman - Freshman (6’6”, 242); 15 Brock Purdy - Junior (6'1", 212); 18 Devin Larsen - (redshirt) Freshman (6’4”, 243); 20 Hayes Gibson - Freshman (6’1”, 193); Running back: 3 Kene Nwangwu - (redshirt) Senior (6'1", 210); 4 Johnnie Lang - (redshirt) Junior (5'8", 185); 6 Rory Walling - (redshirt) Junior (5'11", 189); 21 Jirehl Brock - (redshirt) Freshman (6’0”, 200); 28 Breece Hall - Sophomore (6’1", 215); 34 Blaze Doxzon - Freshman (5’9”, 190); 35 Tyler Moen - Freshman (5’11”, 185); Wide receiver: 1 Tarique Milton - (redshirt) Junior (5’10", 185)’’'; 2 Sean Shaw Jr. - (redshirt) Sophomore (6’6”, 212); 8 Xavier Hutchinson - Junior (6’3”, 207); 9 Joseph Scates - (redshirt) Sophomore (6'2", 191); 10 Darien Porter - (redshirt) Freshman (6’4”, 180); 16 Daniel Jackson - Freshman (6’2”, 210); 17 Darren Wilson - Junior (6’3”, 206); 19 Beau Coberley - (redshirt) Sophomore (5'11", 175); 23 Parker Rickert - (redshirt) Junior (5'11", 193); 26 Michael Tweten - Freshman (5'11", 174); 81 D’Shayne James - Freshman (6’3”, 224); 82 Landen Akers - (redshirt) Senior (6'0", 191); 84 Ezeriah Anderson - (redshirt) Freshman (6’5”, 208); 85 Aidan Bitter - Freshman (6’2”, 182); 87 Ryan Pritchard - (redshirt) Freshman (6’3”, 200); Placekicker: 90 Alex Probert - (redshirt) Senior (5’9”, 188); 93 Eddie Ogamaba - (redshirt) Junior (6’1”, 200); 94 Cameron Shook - (redshirt) Sophomore (6’3”, 185); 96 Connor Assalley - (redshirt) Senior (6'0", 195); 97 Drake Nettles - (redshirt) Freshman (5’11”, 181)	Tight end: 11 Chase Allen - (redshirt) Senior (6'7", 240); 40 Will Zahradnik - Freshman (6’6”, 206); 43 Jared Rus - (redshirt) Sophomore (6’2”, 232); 44 Dan Sichterman - (redshirt) Junior (6’3”, 260); 80 Skylar Loving-Black - (redshirt) Freshman (6’3”, 231); 83 DeShawn Hanika - (redshirt) Freshman (6’6”, 236); 86 Jacob Hillman - (redshirt) Sophomore (6’2”, 220); 87 Easton Dean - (redshirt) Freshman (6’6”, 251); 88 Charlie Kolar - (redshirt) Junior (6'6", 257); 89 Dylan Soehner - (redshirt) Senior (6'7", 272); Offensive lineman: 52 Trevor Downing - (redshirt) Sophomore (6’4”, 314); 54 Jarrod Hufford - (redshirt) Freshman (6’5”, 308); 55 Darrell Simmons Jr. - (redshirt) Freshman (6’3”, 306); 56 Anthony Smith - Freshman (6’3”, 282); 57 Colin Newell - (redshirt) Junior (6'4", 304); 59 Jack Hester - Freshman (6’4”, 249); 60 Owen Terwilliger - (redshirt) Freshman (6’5”, 303); 61 Evan Kilstrom - (redshirt) Freshman (6’5”, 302); 62 Noah Juergensen - (redshirt) Senior (6'4", 309); 64 Derek Schweiger - (redshirt) Junior (6'3", 311); 65 Sam Rengert - Freshman (6’7”, 295); 66 Tyler Miller - Freshman (6’9”, 317); 67 Grant Treiber - (redshirt) Freshman (6’6”, 323); 68 Zach Ross - (redshirt) Sophomore (6’2”, 297); 70 Joe Lilienthal - Freshman (6’6”, 306); 72 Jake Remsburg - (redshirt) Freshman (6'6", 315); 73 Brady Petersen - Freshman (6’5”, 290); 74 Hayden Pauls - Freshman (6’5”, 288); 75 Sean Foster - (redshirt) Senior (6'8", 318); 76 Joey Ramos - (redshirt) Sophomore (6’5”, 303); 77 Robert Hudson - (redshirt) Junior (6’7”, 360); 78 Nick Lawler - Freshman (6’3”, 338); Defensive lineman: 3 JaQuan Bailey - (redshirt) Senior (6’2”, 261); 8 Cordarrius Bailey - (redshirt) Junior (6’3”, 253); 9 Will McDonald IV - (redshirt) Sophomore (6’4”, 230); 44 Johnny Wilson - Freshman (6’2”, 272); 45 Corey Suttle - (redshirt) Freshman (6’4”, 247); 55 Zach Petersen - Junior (6’5”, 267); 56 Latrell Bankston - Junior (6’0”, 301); 58 Eyioma Uwazurike - (redshirt) Senior (6'6", 310); 71 Alex Kleinow - (redshirt) Junior (6’6”, 317); 90 Joshua Bailey - (redshirt) Senior (6’2”, 288); 91 Blake Peterson - (redshirt) Freshman (6’4”, 255); 92 Matt Seres - (redshirt) Sophomore (6’0”, 319); 93 Isaiah Lee - (redshirt) Sophomore (6’0”, 301); 94 Kyle Krezek - (redshirt) Freshman (6’3”, 248); 95 Tucker Robertson - (redshirt) Junior (6’3”, 296); 96 J. R. Singleton - Freshman (6’2”, 288); 97 Kaden Sutton - Freshman (6’0”, 278); 98 Seth Greiner - Freshman (6’3”, 245)	Linebacker: 20 Aric Horne - (redshirt) Freshman (6’1”, 223); 21 Cole Pedersen - Freshman (6'3", 220); 22 Kade Lynott - Freshman (6’1”, 200); 23 Mike Rose - Junior (6’4”, 245); 32 Gerry Vaughn - (redshirt) Sophomore (5'11", 225); 34 O'Rien Vance - (redshirt) Junior (6’2”, 248); 35 Jake Hummel - Senior (6’1”, 228); 38 Levi Hummel- (redshirt) Freshman (5’11”, 228); 38 Ar’Quel Smith - Freshman (5’11”, 209); 40 Hunter Zenzen - Freshman (6’2”, 223); 42 Jack Tiarks - Freshman (6’3”, 220); 43 Dae’Shawn Davis - (redshirt) Freshman (6’0”, 218); 47 Kendall Jackson - (redshirt) Sophomore (5’11”, 225); 51 Stevo Klotz - Freshman (6’4”, 215); 53 Derek Greiner - (redshirt) Junior (5'11", 237); Defensive back: 1 Isheem Young - (redshirt) Freshman (5'10", 200); 2 Datrone Young - (redshirt) Junior (5’9”, 170); 4 Arnold Azunna - (redshirt) Senior (6'0", 199); 11 Lawrence White - (redshirt) Senior (6'0", 197); 12 Greg Eisworth - (redshirt) Sophomore (6'0", 198); 13 Tayvonn Kyle - (redshirt) Sophomore (5’11”, 174); 14 Michal Antoine Jr. - Freshman (6’0”, 180); 16 Answer Gaye - (redshirt) Sophomore (5’10”, 173); 17 Shane Starcevich - (redshirt) Sophomore (6'0", 182); 19 Kym-Mani King - Sophomore (5’10”, 169); 24 D.J. Miller Jr. - Sophomore (5’11”, 176); 25 Tyler Rodgers - (redshirt) Freshman (5’11”, 182); 25 T. J. Tampa - Freshman (6’2”, 178); 26 Anthony Johnson Jr. - Junior (6’0”, 192); 27 Craig McDonald - Freshman (6’3”, 199); 29 Vonzell Kelley III - (redshirt) Freshman (6’0”, 182); 31 Virdel Edwards II - (redshirt) Freshman (6’1”, 205); 33 Mason Chambers - Freshman (6’3”, 206); 36 Mason Cassady - (redshirt) Freshman (6’0”, 187); 37 Jordyn Morgan - Freshman (6’0”, 184); 48 Benjamin Dunkleberger - (redshirt) Sophomore (6’0”, 168); Long snappers: 41 Koby Hathcock- Freshman (5’10”, 212); 49 Trey Fancher - (redshirt) Freshman (6’4”, 191); 59 Connor Guess - (redshirt) Sophomore (5’11”, 223); Punter: 7 Joe Rivera - (redshirt) Senior (6'2", 200); 13 Corey Dunn - (redshirt) Senior (6’0”, 198)

== Awards and honors ==
All-American honors
Player	Selection
Offense
Breece Hall	(AFCA, AP, Athletic, CBS, ESPN, FWAA, Phil Steele, TSN, USAT, WCFF)
Defense
JaQuan Bailey	(FWAA, Phil Steele)
Mike Rose	(Athletic, Phil Steele, USAT)

Iowa State led all Big 12 schools with nine All-Big 12 first team players.

All-Big 12
Player	Selection
Offense
Brock Purdy	Coaches-1; Media-2
Breece Hall	Coaches-1; Media-1
Xavier Hutchinson	Coaches-1; Media-2
Charlie Kolar	Coaches-1; Media-1
Colin Newell	Coaches-1; Media-2
Chase Allen	Coaches-2
Derek Schweiger	Coaches-2; Media-2
Darrell Simmons	Coaches-HM
Dylan Soehner	Coaches-HM
Defense
JaQuan Bailey	Coaches-1; Media-1
Will McDonald IV	Coaches-1
Mike Rose	Coaches-1; Media-1
Greg Eisworth	Coaches-1; Media-2
Jake Hummel	Coaches-HM
Anthony Johnson Jr.	Coaches-HM
Tayvonn Kyle	Coaches-HM
Isaiah Lee	Coaches-HM
Eyioma Uwazurike	Coaches-HM
Lawrence White	Coaches-HM
Special teams
Kene Nwangwu	Coaches-HM

Hall was a unanimous selection.

Individual awards
Player	Award
Matt Campbell	Chuck Neinas Big 12 Coach of the Year; AP Big 12 Coach of the Year
Breece Hall	Big 12 Offensive Player of the Year; AP Big 12 Offensive Player of the Year
Mike Rose	Big 12 Defensive Player of the Year; AP Big 12 Defensive Player of the Year
Xavier Hutchinson	Big 12 Offensive Newcomer of the Year
Isheem Young	Big 12 Defensive Co-Freshman of the Year

Honorable Mention for Individual Big 12 Awards: JaQuan Bailey (Defensive Lineman of the Year), Latrell Bankston (Defensive Newcomer of the Year), Colin Newell (Offensive Lineman of the Year), Darrell Simmons (Offensive Freshman of the Year) and Rory Walling (Special Teams Player of the Year).

Weekly awards
Player	Award	Date awarded
JaQuan Bailey	Big 12 Defensive Player of the Week	September 28, 2020
Breece Hall	Big 12 Offensive Player of the Week	October 5, 2020
Breece Hall	Big 12 Offensive Player of the Week	October 26, 2020
Breece Hall	Big 12 Offensive Player of the Week	November 9, 2020
Mike Rose	Big 12 Defensive Player of the Week	November 9, 2020
Latrell Bankston	Big 12 Defensive Player of the Week	November 30, 2020
Brock Purdy	Big 12 Offensive Player of the Week	December 7, 2020

== TV ratings ==
Opponent	Outlet	Viewers	Rating
Louisiana	ESPN	1.68M	1.0
@ TCU	FS1	346K	0.19
Oklahoma	ABC	3.71M	2.1
Texas Tech	ABC	1.38M	0.9
@ Oklahoma State	FOX	2.81M	1.6
@ Kansas	FS1	247K	0.14
Baylor	FS1	487K	0.28
Kansas State	FOX	1.98M	1.15
@ Texas	ABC	3.57M	2.1
West Virginia	ESPN	1.22M	0.7
vs. Oklahoma	ABC	2.99M	1.8
vs. Oregon	ESPN	6.68M	3.8

All totals via Sports Media Watch. Streaming numbers not included. † - Data not available.

== Players drafted into the NFL ==
Round	Pick	Player	Position	NFL club
4	119	Kene Nwangwu	RB	Minnesota Vikings
