= 2020 Kansas State Wildcats football team =

American college football season

2020 Kansas State Wildcats football
- Conference: Big 12 Conference
- Record: 4–6 (4–5 Big 12)
- Head coach: Chris Klieman (2nd season)
- Offensive coordinator: Courtney Messingham (2nd season)
- Offensive scheme: Pro-style
- Defensive coordinator: Joe Klanderman (1st season)
- Base defense: 3–3–5
- Home stadium: Bill Snyder Family Football Stadium

2020 Big 12 Conference football standings
	Conf.			Overall
Team	W		L	W		L
No. 9 Iowa State y	8	–	1	9	–	3
No. 6 Oklahoma y$	6	–	2	9	–	2
No. 20 Oklahoma State	6	–	3	8	–	3
No. 19 Texas	5	–	3	7	–	3
TCU	5	–	4	6	–	4
West Virginia	4	–	4	6	–	4
Kansas State	4	–	5	4	–	6
Texas Tech	3	–	6	4	–	6
Baylor	2	–	7	2	–	7
Kansas	0	–	8	0	–	9
Championship: Oklahoma 27, Iowa State 21
$ – Conference champion; y – Championship game participant; Rankings from AP Poll.

The 2020 Kansas State Wildcats football team represented Kansas State University in the 2020 NCAA Division I FBS football season. The Wildcats played their home games at Bill Snyder Family Football Stadium in Manhattan, Kansas, and competed in the Big 12 Conference. They were led by second-year head coach Chris Klieman.

After completing their regular season with a record of 4–6 (4–5 in conference play), the program announced on December 16 that it would not pursue a bid to a bowl game, "because of mounting COVID-19 issues on its roster."

== Previous season ==
The Wildcats finished the 2019 season with an 8–5 record, 5–4 Big 12 play, losing the Liberty Bowl to Navy.

== Preseason ==
=== Big 12 media Days ===
The Big 12 media days were held on July 21–22, 2020 in a virtual format due to the COVID-19 pandemic.

=== Big 12 media poll ===
Big 12 media poll
Predicted finish	Team	Votes (1st place)
1	Oklahoma	80
2	Oklahoma State	6
3	Texas	4
4	Iowa State	
5	Baylor	
6	TCU	
7	Kansas State	
8	West Virginia	
9	Texas Tech	
10	Kansas	

== Schedule ==
=== Regular season ===
Kansas State released its 2020 schedule on October 22, 2019.

The Wildcats had games scheduled against Buffalo and North Dakota as out of conference opponents, but these games were canceled due to the COVID-19 pandemic. In fact, the whole season schedule was changed and the finalized one is shown below. The original schedule is shown under Game Summaries.

Date	Time	Opponent	Rank	Site	TV	Result	Attendance
September 12	11:00 a.m.	Arkansas State*		Bill Snyder Family Stadium; Manhattan, KS	FOX	L 31–35	11,041
September 26	11:00 a.m.	at No. 3 Oklahoma		Gaylord Family Oklahoma Memorial Stadium; Norman, OK	FOX	W 38–35	22,700
October 3	2:30 p.m.	Texas Tech		Bill Snyder Family Stadium; Manhattan, KS	FS1	W 31–21	10,932
October 10	3:00 p.m.	at TCU		Amon G. Carter Stadium; Fort Worth, TX	FOX	W 21–14	12,208
October 24	11:00 a.m.	Kansas	No. 20	Bill Snyder Family Stadium; Manhattan, KS (rivalry)	FS1	W 55–14	10,801
October 31	11:00 a.m.	at West Virginia	No. 16	Milan Puskar Stadium; Morgantown, WV	ESPN2	L 10–37	10,441
November 7	3:00 p.m.	No. 14 Oklahoma State		Bill Snyder Family Stadium; Manhattan, KS	FOX	L 18–20	11,980
November 21	3:00 p.m.	at No. 17 Iowa State		Jack Trice Stadium; Ames, IA (rivalry)	FOX	L 0–45	0
November 28	6:00 p.m.	at Baylor		McLane Stadium; Waco, TX	ESPN2	L 31–32	11,667
December 5	11:00 a.m.	Texas		Bill Snyder Family Stadium; Manhattan, KS	FOX	L 31–69	9,851
*Non-conference game; Rankings from AP Poll and CFP Rankings (after November 24) released prior to game; All times are in Central time

Schedule source:

== Coaching staff ==
Name	Position	Year at Kansas State	Previous job
Chris Klieman	Head coach	2nd	North Dakota State (HC)
Joe Klanderman	DC/S	2nd	North Dakota State (DB)
Courtney Messingham	OC/TE	2nd	North Dakota State (OC/RB)
Van Malone	AHC/PGC/CB	2nd	Mississippi State (DA)
Brian Anderson	RB	2nd	Illinois State (WR)
Collin Klein	QB	6th	Northern Iowa (QB)
Jason Ray	WR	2nd	North Dakota State (WR)
Conor Riley	OL	2nd	North Dakota State (OL)
Steve Stanard	LB	1st	Syracuse University (DE)
Mike Tuiasosopo	DT	2nd	UTEP (DL)
Buddy Wyatt	DE	2nd	Kansas (senior analyst)

== Game summaries ==
=== Vs. Arkansas State ===
Arkansas State Red Wolves (0–1) vs. Kansas State Wildcats (0–0)

Quarter	1	2	3	4	Total
Arkansas State	7	7	7	14	35
Kansas State	7	14	0	10	31

at Bill Snyder Family Stadium • Manhattan, KS

- Date: Saturday, September 12, 2020
- Game time: 11:00 a.m. CDT
- Game weather: partly cloudy • Temperature: 70°F
- Game attendance: 11,041
- Referee: Scott Campbell
- TV announcers (Fox): Gus Johnson, Joel Klatt, and Jenny Taft

Game information

First Quarter

- (13:24) KSU – Phillip Brooks 17-yard pass from Skylar Thompson, Blake Lynch kick (Drive: 2 plays, 19 yards, 0:51, KSU 7–0)
- (9:58) ARST – Jonathan Adams Jr. 2-yard pass from Logan Bonner, Blake Grupe kick (Drive: 9 plays, 75 yards, 3:26, TIED 7–7)

Second Quarter

- (13:29) KSU – Deuce Vaughn 3-yard rush, Blake Lynch kick (Drive: 7 plays, 49 yards, 3:47, KSU 14–7)
- (8:41) KSU – Briley Moore 7-yard pass from Skylar Thompson, Blake Lynch kick (Drive: 7 plays, 92 yards, 4:01, KSU 21–7)
- (6:50) ARST – Roshauud Paul 48-yard pass from Jeff Foreman, Blake Grupe kick (Drive: 5 plays, 75 yards, 1:51, KSU 21–14)

Third Quarter

- (2:28) ARST – Giles Amos 8-yard pass from Layne Hatcher, Blake Grupe kick (Drive: 5 plays, 77 yards, 1:46, TIED 21–21)

Fourth Quarter

- (11:49) ARST – Jonathan Adams Jr. 5-yard pass from Logan Bonner, Blake Grupe kick (Drive: 10 plays, 71 yards, 3:00, ARST 28–21)
- (6:35) KSU – Harry Trotter 5-yard rush, Blake Lynch kick (Drive: 10 plays, 55 yards, 5:07, TIED 28–28)
- (2:30) KSU – Blake Lynch 35-yard field goal (Drive: 7 plays, 47 yards, 3:14, KSU 31–28)
- (0:38) ARST – Jonathan Adams Jr. 17-yard pass from Layne Hatcher, Blake Grupe kick (Drive: 7 plays, 65 yards, 1:46, ARST 35–31)

Statistics	ARST	KSU
First downs	26	21
Total yards	489	374
Rushes/yards	159	91
Passing yards	330	283
Passing: Comp–Att–Int	25-38-1	18–30–0
Time of possession	25:44	34:16

Team	Category	Player	Statistics
Arkansas State	Passing	Logan Bonner	17–28, 204 yds, 2 TD, 1 INT
Arkansas State	Rushing	Jamal Jones	16 carries, 95 yds
Arkansas State	Receiving	Jonathan Adams Jr.	8 receptions, 98 yds, 3 td
Kansas State	Passing	Skylar Thompson	17–29, 259 yds, 2 TD
Kansas State	Rushing	Deuce Vaughn	12 carries, 47 yds, 1 TD
Kansas State	Receiving	Chabastin Taylor	4 receptions, 98 yds

Both teams entered the game with a reduced roster due to the effects of the coronavirus pandemic. Arkansas State was down nearly 10 starters and K-State was without approximately two dozen players—however, both teams had enough active personnel to play the game. After the game, Arkansas State announced that it will not play its home opener game Central Arkansas the Red Wolves were unable to assemble a complete depth chart for the game.

=== At No. 3 Oklahoma ===
Kansas State Wildcats (0–1) vs. No. 3 Oklahoma Sooners (1–0)

Quarter	1	2	3	4	Total
Kansas State	0	7	14	17	38
No. 3 Oklahoma	7	14	14	0	35

at Gaylord Family Oklahoma Memorial Stadium • Norman, OK

- Date: Saturday, September 26, 2020
- Game time: 11:00 a.m. CDT
- Game weather: • Temperature:
- Game attendance: 22,700
- Referee: Brad Van Vark
- TV announcers (FOX): Gus Johnson (Play-by-Play), Joel Klatt (analyst), Jenny Taft (sideline)

Game information

First Quarter

- (5:29) OKLA – Spencer Rattler 11 yard pass to Marvin Mims, Gabe Brkic kick (Drive: 11 plays, 83 yards, 4:37; OU 7-0)

Second Quarter

- (14:50) OKLA – Spencer Rattler 32 yard pass to Drake Stoops, Gabe Brkic kick (Drive: 9 plays, 74 yards, 3:57; OU 14-0)
- (5:10) KSU – Skylar Thompson 39 yard pass to Chabastin Taylor, Blake Lynch kick (Drive: 9 plays, 65 yards, 4:37; OU 14-7)
- (0:44) OKLA – Spencer Rattler 9 yard pass to Marvin Mims, Gabe Brkic kick (Drive: 10 plays, 75 yards, 4:26; OU 21-7)

Third Quarter

- (6:35) OKLA – Spencer Rattler 21 yard pass to Jeremiah Hall, Gabe Brkic kick (Drive: 5 plays, 87 yards, 1:50; OU 28-7)
- (5:00) KSU – Skylar Thompson 1 yard rush, Blake Lynch kick (Drive: 3 plays, 78 yards, 1:35; OU 28–14)
- (2:46) OKLA – Seth McGowan 5 yard rush, Gabe Brkic kick (Drive: 5 plays, 75 yards, 2:14; OU 35–14)
- (1:36) KSU – Skylar Thompson 2 yard rush, Blake Lynch kick (Drive: 3 plays, 75 yards, 1:10; OU 35–21)

Fourth Quarter

- (12:28) KSU – Skylar Thompson 4 yard rush, Blake Lynch kick (Drive: 8 plays, 38 yards, 3:47; OU 35–28)
- (8:17) KSU – Deuce Vaughn 38 yard rush, Blake Lynch kick (Drive: 2 plays, 38 yards, 3:47; Tied 35–35)
- (4:32) KSU – Blake Lynch 50 yard field goal (Drive: 5 plays, 29 yards, 2:00; KSU 38–35)

Statistics	KSU	OKLA
First downs	10	28
Total yards	390	517
Rushes/yards	26-56	35–130
Passing yards	334	387
Passing: Comp–Att–Int	18-25	30–41
Time of possession	27:52	32:08

Team	Category	Player	Statistics
Kansas State	Passing	Skylar Thompson	18–25, 334 yds, 1 TD
Kansas State	Rushing	Deuce Vaughn	8 carries, 35 yards, 1 TD
Kansas State	Receiving	Deuce Vaughn	4 receptions, 129 yards
Oklahoma	Passing	Spencer Rattler	30–41, 387 yards, 4 TD, 3 INT
Oklahoma	Rushing	Seth McGowan	13 carries, 73 yards, 1 TD
Oklahoma	Receiving	Drake Stoops	3 receptions, 93 yards, 1 TD

=== Vs. Texas Tech ===
Texas Tech Red Raiders (1–1) vs. Kansas State Wildcats (1–1)

Quarter	1	2	3	4	Total
Texas Tech	0	0	14	7	21
Kansas State	7	7	3	14	31

at Bill Snyder Family Stadium • Manhattan, KS

- Date: Saturday, October 3, 2020
- Game time: 2:30 p.m. CDT
- Game weather: Sunny • Temperature: 66 °F (19 °C) • Wind: N 12 MPH
- Game attendance: 10,932
- Referee: Tuta Salaam
- TV announcers (FS1): Joe Davis and Mark Helfrich

Game information

First quarter

- KSU – Briley Moore 12-yard pass from Skylar Thompson (Blake Lynch kick), 8:56. Wildcats 7–0. Drive: 3 plays, 20 yards, 0:54.

Second quarter

- KSU – Deuce Vaughn 18-yard run (Blake Lynch kick), 5:25. Wildcats 14–0. Drive: 13 plays, 97 yards, 6:49.

Third quarter

- TTU – KeSean Carter 3-yard pass from Henry Colombi (Trey Wolff kick), 8:05. Wildcats 14–7. Drive: 18 plays, 88 yards, 6:55.
- KSU – Blake Lynch 28-yard field goal, 3:34. Wildcats 17–7. Drive: 11 plays, 55 yards, 4:26.
- TTU – Xavier White 49-yard run (Trey Wolff kick), 2:14. Wildcats 17–14. Drive: 4 plays, 84 yards, 1:14.

Fourth quarter

- TTU – Myles Price 13-yard pass from Henry Colombi (Trey Wolff kick), 11:11. Red Raiders 21–17. Drive: 7 plays, 74 yards, 2:21.
- KSU – Harry Trotter 4-yard run (Blake Lynch kick), 10:00. Wildcats 24–21. Drive: 3 plays, 75 yards, 1:11.
- KSU – Deuce Vaughn 70-yard pass from Will Howard (Blake Lynch kick), 2:07. Wildcats 31–21. Drive: 6 plays, 88 yards, 1:35.

Statistics	TTU	KSU
First downs	27	20
Total yards	471	404
Rushes/yards	34-204	42–198
Passing yards	267	206
Passing: Comp–Att–Int	34-49-1	12–22–0
Time of possession	31:39	28:21

Team	Category	Player	Statistics
Texas Tech	Passing	Henry Colombi	30–42, 244 yards, 2 TD, 1 INT
Texas Tech	Rushing	Xavier White	12 carries, 113 yards, 1 TD
Texas Tech	Receiving	Erik Ezukanma	5 receptions, 77 yards
Kansas State	Passing	Will Howard	7–12, 173 yards, 1 TD
Kansas State	Rushing	Deuce Vaughn	16 carries, 113 yards, 1 TD
Kansas State	Receiving	Deuce Vaughn	3 receptions, 81 yards, 1 TD

=== At TCU ===
Kansas State Wildcats (2–1) vs. TCU Horned Frogs (1–1)

Quarter	1	2	3	4	Total
Kansas State	6	8	7	0	21
TCU	7	0	0	7	14

at Amon G. Carter Stadium • Fort Worth, TX

- Date: Saturday, October 10, 2020
- Game time: 3:00 p.m. CDT
- Game weather: • Temperature:
- Game attendance: 12,208
- TV: FOX

Game information

First Quarter

Second Quarter

Third Quarter

Fourth Quarter

Statistics	KSU	TCU
First downs	12	20
Total yards	289	342
Rushes/yards	38-172	37–189
Passing yards	117	153
Passing: Comp–Att–Int	8-19-1	22–38–1
Time of possession	30:15	29:45

Team	Category	Player	Statistics
Kansas State	Passing	Will Howard	8–19, 117 yards, 1 INT
Kansas State	Rushing	Will Howard	13 carries, 86 yards, 1 TD
Kansas State	Receiving	Deuce Vaughn	1 reception, 45 yards
TCU	Passing	Max Duggan	19–31, 154 yards
TCU	Rushing	Darwin Barlow	8 carries, 56 yards, 1 TD
TCU	Receiving	Blair Conwright	6 receptions, 60 yards

=== Vs. Kansas (homecoming) ===
Kansas Jayhawks (0–4) vs. No. 20 Kansas State Wildcats (3–1)

Quarter	1	2	3	4	Total
Kansas	0	7	0	7	14
No. 20 Kansas State	7	27	21	0	55

at Bill Snyder Family Stadium • Manhattan, KS

- Date: Saturday, October 24, 2020
- Game time: 11:00 a.m. CDT
- Game weather: Cloudy • Temperature: 40 °F (4 °C) • Wind: SE 8 MPH
- Game attendance: 10,801
- Referee: Kevin Hassell
- TV announcers (FS1): Eric Collins, Ben Leber

Game information

First Quarter

- (9:22) KSU – Phillip Brooks 55-yard punt return, Blake Lynch kick (Drive: 3 plays, 9 yards, 1:29, KSU 7–0)

Second Quarter

- (11:23) KSU – Blake Lynch 32-yard field goal (Drive: 4 plays, 6 yards, 1:57, KSU 10–0)
- (6:13) KSU – Blake Lynch 21-yard field goal (Drive: 8 plays, 35 yards, 3:43, KSU 13–0)
- (5:26) KSU – Justin Gardner 24-yard interception return, Blake Lynch kick (Drive: 3 plays, 2 yards, 0:47, KSU 20–0)
- (2:16) KU – Jalon Daniels 8-yard run, Jacob Borcila kick (Drive: 9 plays, 75 yards, 3:10, KSU 20–7)
- (0:52) KSU – Will Howard 16-yard pass to Samuel Wheeler, Blake Lynch kick (Drive: 3 plays, 41 yards, 0:29, KSU 27–7)
- (0:00) KSU – Phillip Brooks 52-yard punt return, Blake Lynch kick (Drive: 0 plays, 0 yards, 0:00, KSU 34–7)

Third Quarter

- (12:17) KSU – Deuce Vaughn 1-yard run, Blake Lynch kick (Drive: 6 plays, 69 yards, 2:41, KSU 41–7)
- (7:42) KSU – Harry Trotter 1-yard run, Blake Lynch kick (Drive: 7 plays, 71 yards, 3:25, KSU 48–7)
- (0:48) KSU – Will Howard 13-yard pass to Briley Moore, Blake Lynch kick (Drive: 11 plays, 94 yards, 5:22, KSU 55–7)

Fourth Quarter

- (4:38) KU – Jalon Daniels 4-yard run, Jacob Borcila kick (Drive: 1 play, 15 yards, 0:11, KSU 55–14)

Statistics	KAN	KSU
First downs	18	17
Total yards	320	381
Rushes/yards	39-113	33–129
Passing yards	207	252
Passing: Comp–Att–Int	22-39-1	18–28–0
Time of possession	30:40	29:20

Team	Category	Player	Statistics
Kansas	Passing	Jalon Daniels	22–39, 207 yards, 1 INT
Kansas	Rushing	Velton Gardner	16 carries, 72 yards
Kansas	Receiving	Kwamie Lassiter II	7 receptions, 58 yards
Kansas State	Passing	Will Howard	17–24, 243 yards, 2 TD
Kansas State	Rushing	Deuce Vaughn	11 carries, 71 yards, 1 TD
Kansas State	Receiving	Deuce Vaughn	4 receptions, 81 yards

Phillip Brooks, sophomore wide receiver, had two punt returns in the first half.

=== At West Virginia ===
No. 16 Kansas State Wildcats (4–1) vs. West Virginia Mountaineers (3–2)

Quarter	1	2	3	4	Total
Kansas State	0	0	0	0	0
West Virginia	0	0	0	0	0

at Milan Puskar Stadium • Morgantown, WV

- Date: Saturday, October 31, 2020
- Game time: 11:00 a.m. CDT
- Game weather: • Temperature:
- Game attendance: 10,441
- TV: ESPN2

Game information

First Quarter

Second Quarter

Third Quarter

Fourth Quarter

Statistics	KSU	WVU
First downs		
Total yards		
Rushes/yards		
Passing yards		
Passing: Comp–Att–Int		
Time of possession		

Team	Category	Player	Statistics
Kansas State	Passing		
Kansas State	Rushing		
Kansas State	Receiving		
West Virginia	Passing		
West Virginia	Rushing		
West Virginia	Receiving		

=== Vs. No. 14 Oklahoma State ===
No. 14 Oklahoma State Cowboys (4–1) vs. Kansas State Wildcats (4–2)

Quarter	1	2	3	4	Total
No. 14 Oklahoma State	0	0	13	7	20
Kansas State	3	9	0	6	18

at Bill Snyder Family Stadium • Manhattan, KS

- Date: Saturday, November 7, 2020
- Game time: CST
- Game weather: Sunny • Temperature: 75 °F (24 °C)
- Game attendance: 11,980
- Referee: Michael Vandervelde
- TV announcers (FOX): Tim Brando (play-by-play), Spencer Tillman (analyst)

Game information

First Quarter

- (4:35) KSU – Blake Lynch 30-yard field goal (Drive: 11 plays, 56 yards, 5:14; Kansas State 3–0)

Second Quarter

- (8:58) KSU – Blake Lynch 29-yard field goal (Drive: 11 plays, 69 yards, 5:53; Kansas State 6–0)
- (0:37) KSU – Phillip Brooks 4-yard pass from Will Howard (Drive: 9 plays, 89 yards, 2:14; Kansas State 12–0)

Third Quarter

- (10:39) OKST – Alex Hale 35-yard field goal (Drive: 9 plays, 56 yards, 2:15; Kansas State 12–3)
- (7:30) OKST – Brennan Presley 9-yard run, Alex Hale kick (Drive: 4 plays, 51 yards, 2:10; Kansas State 12–10)
- (0:58) OKST – Alex Hale 33-yard field goal (Drive: 11 plays, 55 yards, 4:42; Oklahoma State 13–12)

Fourth Quarter

- (6:32) OKST – Jason Taylor II 85-yard fumble return, Alex Hale kick (Drive: 4 plays, 70 yards, 2:08; Oklahoma State 20–12)
- (2:08) KSU – Will Howard 2-yard run (Drive: 8 plays, 60 yards, 4:17; Oklahoma State 20–18)

Statistics	OKST	KSU
First downs	14	15
Total yards	256	370
Rushes/yards	40–148	44–227
Passing yards	108	143
Passing: Comp–Att–Int	14–23–0	10–22–1
Time of possession	28:09	31:51

Team	Category	Player	Statistics
Oklahoma State	Passing	Spencer Sanders	14/23, 108 yards
Oklahoma State	Rushing	LD Brown	15 carries, 110 yards
Oklahoma State	Receiving	Dillon Stoner	7 receptions, 62 yards
Kansas State	Passing	Will Howard	10/21, 143 yards, TD, INT
Kansas State	Rushing	Will Howard	14 carries, 125 yards, TD
Kansas State	Receiving	Sammy Wheeler	1 reception, 58 yards

=== At Iowa State ===
Kansas State Wildcats (4–3) vs. No. 17 Iowa State Cyclones (5–2)

Quarter	1	2	3	4	Total
Kansas State	0	0	0	0	0
No. 17 Iowa State	7	28	3	7	45

at Jack Trice Stadium • Ames, IA

- Date: Thursday, November 21, 2020
- Game time: 3:00 p.m. CST
- Game weather: Overcast • Temperature: 41°F
- Game attendance: 0
- Referee: Brandon Cruse
- TV announcers (FOX): Tim Brando, Spencer Tillman

Game information

First Quarter

- (12:00) ISU – Joe Scates 33 Yd pass from Brock Purdy (Connor Assalley Kick) (Drive: 6 plays, 75 yards, 3:00; ISU 7–0)

Second Quarter

- (14:56) ISU – Charlie Kolar 6 Yd pass from Brock Purdy (Connor Assalley Kick) (Drive: 11 plays, 97 yards, 6:27; ISU 14–0)
- (6:38) ISU – Xavier Hutchinson 21 Yd pass from Brock Purdy (Connor Assalley Kick) (Drive: 6 plays, 46 yards, 3:18; ISU 21–0)
- (4:30) ISU – Breece Hall 33 Yd Run (Connor Assalley Kick) (Drive: 3 plays, 88 yards, 1:03; ISU 28–0)
- (1:01) ISU – Breece Hall 21 Yd Run (Connor Assalley Kick) (Drive: 6 plays, 38 yards, 3:16; ISU 35–0)

Third Quarter

- (1:01) ISU – Connor Assalley 32 Yd Field Goal (Drive: 6 plays, 37 yards, 2:12; ISU 38–0)

Fourth Quarter

- (10:55) ISU – Hunter Dekkers 12 Yd Run (Connor Assalley Kick) (Drive: 3 plays, 32 yards, 0:53; ISU 45–0)

Statistics	KSU	ISU
First downs	9	26
Total yards	149	539
Rushes/yards	28–73	44–240
Passing yards	76	299
Passing: Comp–Att–Int	9–19–1	19–25–0
Time of possession	23:05	36:55

Team	Category	Player	Statistics
Kansas State	Passing	Nick Ast	6/10, 44 yards
Kansas State	Rushing	Deuce Vaughn	7 carries, 44 yards
Kansas State	Receiving	Chabastin Taylor	2 receptions, 37 yards
Iowa State	Passing	Brock Purdy	16/20, 236 yards, 3 TD
Iowa State	Rushing	Breece Hall	15 carries, 135 yards, 2 TD
Iowa State	Receiving	Xavier Hutchinson	6 receptions, 111 yards, TD

=== At Baylor ===
Kansas State Wildcats (4–4) vs. Baylor Bears (1–5)

Quarter	1	2	3	4	Total
Kansas State	14	3	0	14	31
Baylor	6	0	9	17	32

at McLane Stadium • Waco, TX

- Date: Saturday, November 28, 2020
- Game time: 6:00 p.m. CST
- Game weather: Rain • Temperature: 55°F
- Game attendance: 11,667
- Referee: Kevin Mar
- TV: ESPN2

Game information

First Quarter

- (13:04) BAY – Charlie Brewer 7 yard run, rush failed (Drive: 3 plays, 9 yards, 1:07, BAY 6–0)
- (12:51) KSU – Malik Knowles 75 yard run, Blake Lynch kick (Drive: 1 play, 75 yards, 0:13, KSU 7–6)
- (4:07) KSU – Will Howard 8 yard pass to Deuce Vaughn, Blake Lynch kick (Drive: 7 plays, 35 yards, 3:28, KSU 14–6)

Second Quarter

- (13:02) KSU – Blake Lynch 20 yard field goal (Drive: 10 plays, 44 ayrds, 4:33, KSU 17–6)

Third Quarter

- (11:59) BAY – John Mayers 28 yard field goal (Drive: 8 plays, 64 yards, 3:01, KSU 17–9)
- (7:16) BAY – Charlie Brewer 23 yard pass to R.J. Sneed, Charlie Brewer drop-kick failed (Drive: 7 plays, 63 yards, 2:48, KSU 17–15)

Fourth Quarter

- (13:57) KSU – Will Howard 24 yard run, Blake Lynch kick (Drive: 2 plays, 73 yards, 0:51, KSU 24–15)
- (10:51) BAY – Charlie Brewer 8 yard pass to Trestan Ebner, John Mayers kick (Drive: 8 plays, 75 yards, 3:06, KSU 24–22)
- (8:59) KSU – Deuce Vaughn 38 yard run, Blake Lynch kick (Drive: 4 plays, 60 yards, 1:52, KSU 31–22)
- (4:16) BAY – Charlie Brewer 1 yard run, John Mayers kick (Drive: 9 plays, 54 yards, 4:43, KSU 31–29)
- (0:00) BAY – John Mayers 30 yard field goal (Drive: 10 plays, 57 yards, 2:32, BAY 32–31)

Statistics	KSU	BAY
First downs	14	21
Total yards	344	420
Rushes/yards	35–256	36–71
Passing yards	88	349
Passing: Comp–Att–Int	9–18–2	31–39–0
Time of possession	25:42	34:18

Team	Category	Player	Statistics
Kansas State	Passing	Will Howard	9/18, 88 yards, TD, 2 INT
Kansas State	Rushing	Deuce Vaughn	19 carries, 102 yards, TD
Kansas State	Receiving	Briley Moore	2 receptions, 55 yards
Baylor	Passing	Charlie Brewer	31/39, 349 yards, 2 TD
Baylor	Rushing	Charlie Brewer	23 carries, 56 yards, 2 TD
Baylor	Receiving	R.J. Sneed	6 receptions, 86 yards, TD

=== Vs. Texas ===
Texas Longhorns (5–3) vs. Kansas State Wildcats (4–5)

Quarter	1	2	3	4	Total
Texas	17	14	35	3	69
Kansas State	7	10	14	0	31

at Bill Snyder Family Stadium • Manhattan, KS

- Date: Saturday, December 5, 2020
- Game time: 11:00 a.m. CST
- Game weather: Sunny, 43 °F (6 °C), Wind: N 9 mph (14 km/h)
- Game attendance: 9,851
- Referee: M Vandervelde
- TV announcers (FOX): Gus Johnson, Joel Klatt

Game information

First Quarter

- (10:34) UT – Bijan Robinson 12 yard run (Dicker kick), UT 7–0; 7 plays, 81 yards, 2:33
- (4:38) UT – Cameron Dicker 28 yard field goal, UT 10–0; 9 plays, 54 yards, 3:20
- (4:19) UT – Roschon Johnson 3 yard run (Dicker kick), UT 17–0; 1 play, 3 yards, 0:04
- (0:54) KSU – Deuce Vaughn 19 yard run (Lynch kick), UT 17–7; 8 plays, 64 yards, 3:19

Second Quarter

- (14:53) UT – Bijan Robinson 30 yard run (Dicker kick), UT 24–7; 4 plays, 59 yards, 0:52
- (11:40) KSU – Blake Lynch 47 yard field goal, UT 24–10; 7 plays, 46 yards, 3:13
- (8:17) UT – Roschon Johnson 7 yard run (Dicker kick), UT 31–10; 8 plays, 70 yards, 3:17
- (1:20) KSU – Deuce Vaughn 4 yard run (Lynch kick), UT 31–17; 12 plays, 80 yards, 5:10

Third Quarter

- (14:44) UT – Bijan Robinson 75 yard run (Dicker kick), UT 38–17; 2 plays, 75 yards, 0:16
- (11:24) KSU – Malik Knowles 7 yard pass from Will Howard (Lynch kick), UT 38–24; 8 plays, 76 yards, 3:14
- (11:01) UT – Roschon Johnson 1 yard run (Dicker kick), UT 45–24; 1 play, 1 yard, 0:00
- (9:13) KSU – Malik Knowles 29 yard pass from Will Howard (Lynch kick), UT 45–31; 4 plays, 75 yards, 1:48
- (7:01) UT – Jordan Whittington 15 yard run (Dicker kick), UT 52–31; 6 plays, 75 yards, 2:12
- (2:18) UT – Cade Brewer 15 yard pass from Sam Ehlinger (Dicker kick), UT 59–31; 8 plays, 86 yards, 2:53
- (1:06) UT – Malcolm Epps 32 yard pass from Sam Ehlinger (Dicker kick), UT 66–31; 1 play, 32 yards, 0:07

Fourth Quarter

- (7:48) UT – Cameron Dicker 21 yard field goal, UT 69–31; 6 plays, 63 yards, 3:22

Statistics	TEX	KSU
First downs	26	24
Total yards	608	448
Rushes/yards	33–334	46–274
Passing yards	274	174
Passing: Comp–Att–Int	20–27–0	16–27–2
Time of possession	24:20	35:40

Team	Category	Player	Statistics
Texas	Passing	Sam Ehlinger	20/27, 274 yards, 2 TD
Texas	Rushing	Bijan Robinson	9 carries, 172 yards, 3 TD
Texas	Receiving	Jake Smith	4 receptions, 55 yards
Kansas State	Passing	Will Howard	16/27, 174 yards, 2 TD, 2 INT
Kansas State	Rushing	Deuce Vaughn	10 carries, 125 yards, 2 TD
Kansas State	Receiving	Malik Knowles	6 receptions, 95 yards, 2 TD

== Rankings ==
Ranking movements Legend: ██ Increase in ranking ██ Decrease in ranking — = Not ranked RV = Received votes
	Week															
Poll	Pre	1	2	3	4	5	6	7	8	9	10	11	12	13	14	Final
AP	—					RV	RV	22	20	16	RV					
Coaches	RV		—			RV	RV	22	19	16	RV	RV	RV			
CFP	Not released															Not released

== Players drafted into the NFL ==
Round	Pick	Player	Position	NFL Club
7	235	Wyatt Hubert	DE	Cincinnati Bengals
