= 2020 Big 12 Championship Game =

2020 Dr Pepper Big 12 Championship Game
- 19th Big 12 Conference Championship
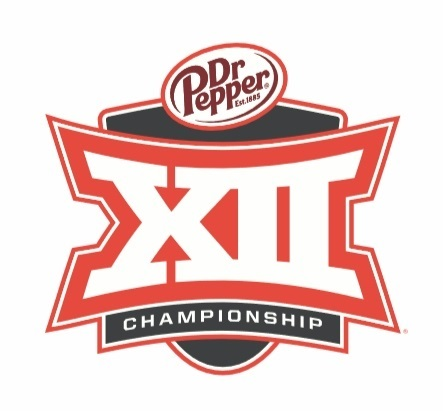
Oklahoma Sooners	Iowa State Cyclones
(7–2)	(8–2)
27	21
Head coach: Lincoln Riley	Head coach: Matt Campbell
AP / Coaches / CFP; 12 / 10 / 10	AP / Coaches / CFP; 8 / 8 / 6
	1	2	3	4	Total
Oklahoma	7	17	0	3	27
Iowa State	0	7	7	7	21
- Date: December 19, 2020
- Season: 2020
- Stadium: AT&T Stadium
- Location: Arlington, Texas
- MVP: Spencer Rattler (QB, Oklahoma)
- Favorite: Oklahoma by 5.5
- Referee: David Alvarez
- Attendance: 18,720

United States TV coverage
- Network: ABC, ESPN Radio
- Announcers: ABC: Sean McDonough (play-by-play), Todd Blackledge (analyst), Todd McShay (sideline) and Allison Williams (sideline); ESPN Radio: Marc Kestecher (play-by-play) and Ben Hartsock (analyst)

2020 Big 12 Conference football standings
	Conf.			Overall
Team	W		L	W		L
No. 9 Iowa State y	8	–	1	9	–	3
No. 6 Oklahoma y$	6	–	2	9	–	2
No. 20 Oklahoma State	6	–	3	8	–	3
No. 19 Texas	5	–	3	7	–	3
TCU	5	–	4	6	–	4
West Virginia	4	–	4	6	–	4
Kansas State	4	–	5	4	–	6
Texas Tech	3	–	6	4	–	6
Baylor	2	–	7	2	–	7
Kansas	0	–	8	0	–	9
Championship: Oklahoma 27, Iowa State 21
$ – Conference champion; y – Championship game participant; Rankings from AP Poll.

The 2020 Big 12 Championship Game was a college football game played on Saturday, December 19, 2020, at AT&T Stadium in Arlington. This was the 19th Big 12 Championship Game and determined the 2020 champion of the Big 12 Conference. The game featured the top-seeded, Iowa State Cyclones and the second-seeded, Oklahoma Sooners. Sponsored by soft drink brand Dr Pepper, the game is officially known as the Dr Pepper Big 12 Championship Game.

The game was originally scheduled for December 5 but rescheduled to December 12 when the new schedule was released, and was eventually pushed even further back to December 19 due to the COVID-19 pandemic.

== Previous season ==
The 2019 Big 12 Championship Game featured Oklahoma against Baylor. It was Baylor's first appearance in the conference title game. Oklahoma had won the regular-season game in Waco 34–31. In the championship game, Oklahoma was victorious by a score of 30–23 in overtime, winning their fifth consecutive and 14th overall Big 12 Conference championship.

== Teams ==
The 2020 Championship game was contested by Iowa State and Oklahoma. The teams met 85 times previously, with Oklahoma leading the series 76–7–2. Iowa State defeated Oklahoma 37–30 in their regular season match-up in Ames.

=== Iowa State ===
Iowa State, led by head coach Matt Campbell, clinched a berth in the championship game after defeating West Virginia on December 5, 2020. This marked their first appearance in a Big 12 Championship Game. Iowa State finished the regular season with eight conference wins and the best record in the Big 12 - both firsts for the program. Entering this game, Iowa State head coach Matt Campbell was the only Cyclone head coach with multiple wins over the Sooners. The Cyclones’ #6 CFP ranking was the highest the program had ever achieved.

=== Oklahoma ===
Oklahoma, led by head coach Lincoln Riley, was the defending Big 12 champion. They clinched a berth in the championship game after defeating Baylor on December 5, 2020. This marked their 12th overall Big 12 championship game appearance, and fifth consecutive win in the Championship Game.

== Game summary ==
2020 Big 12 Championship Game

Quarter	1	2	3	4	Total
No. 10 Oklahoma	7	17	0	3	27
No. 6 Iowa State	0	7	7	7	21

at AT&T Stadium • Arlington, Texas

- Date: December 19, 2020
- Game time: 11:00 a.m. CST
- Game weather: None (retractable roof closed)
- Game attendance: 18,720
- Referee: David Alvarez
- TV announcers (ABC): Sean McDonough (play-by-play), Todd Blackledge (analyst), Todd McShay (sideline) and Allison Williams (sideline)

Game information

First quarter

- (12:05) OKLA – Chandler Morris 2 yard rush, Gabe Brkic kick (Drive: 7 plays, 65 yards, 2:55; Oklahoma 7–0)

Second quarter

- (14:52) OKLA – Marvin Mims 45 yard pass from Spencer Rattler, Gabe Brkic kick (Drive: 5 plays, 74 yards, 1:35; Oklahoma 14–0)
- (8:34) OKLA – Gabe Brkic 54 yard field goal (Drive: 4 plays, 3 yards, 1:20; Oklahoma 17–0)
- (1:34) ISU – Charlie Kolar 10 yard pass from Brock Purdy, Connor Assalley kick (Drive: 6 plays, 66 yards, 2:18; Oklahoma 17–7)
- (0:37) OKLA – Spencer Rattler 9 yard rush, Gabe Brkic kick (Drive: 4 plays, 45 yards, 0:49; Oklahoma 24–7)

Third quarter

- (0:12) ISU – Breece Hall 1 yard rush, Connor Assalley kick (Drive: 9 plays, 90 yards, 4:29; Oklahoma 24–14)

Fourth quarter

- (5:15) ISU – Breece Hall 3 yard rush, Connor Assalley kick (Drive: 12 plays, 87 yards, 4:20; Oklahoma 24–21)
- (2:01) OKLA – Gabe Brkic 32 yard field goal (Drive: 9 plays, 41 yards, 3:05; Oklahoma 27–21)

=== Statistics ===
Statistics	OKLA	ISU
First downs	20	20
Plays–yards	65–392	71–435
Rushes–yards	31–120	31–113
Passing yards	272	322
Passing: comp–att–int	22–34–0	27–40–3
Turnovers		
Time of possession	27:47	32:13

Team	Category	Player	Statistics
Oklahoma	Passing	Spencer Rattler	22/34, 272 yards, 1 TD
Oklahoma	Rushing	Rhamondre Stevenson	18 carries, 97 yards
Oklahoma	Receiving	Marvin Mims	7 receptions, 101 yards, 1 TD
Iowa State	Passing	Brock Purdy	27/40, 322 yards, 1 TD, 3 INT
Iowa State	Rushing	Breece Hall	23 carries, 79 yards, 2 TD
Iowa State	Receiving	Xavier Hutchinson	10 receptions, 114 yards

=== Summary ===
Unlike their matchup earlier in the year, a shootout between two highly efficient offenses, the Oklahoma Sooners instead jumped out to an early 17 point lead which they never relinquished. Trailing 24-7 to begin the 2nd half, both the Cyclone offense and defense sprung to life, scoring 14 unanswered to bring the score within 3 points. A Gabe Brkic field goal with 2 minutes left extended the Sooner lead to 6, leaving the door open for the Cyclones to win the game with a touchdown drive. Driving into Oklahoma territory, Brock Purdy threw his 3rd interception of the day with under a minute to go, sealing the Sooners sixth consecutive Big 12 Championship.

== See also ==
- List of Big 12 Conference football champions
