= 2020 TCU Horned Frogs football team =

American college football season

2020 TCU Horned Frogs football
- Conference: Big 12 Conference
- Record: 6–4 (5–4 Big 12)
- Head coach: Gary Patterson (20th season)
- Offensive coordinator: Sonny Cumbie (7th season)
- Offensive scheme: Spread
- Defensive coordinator: Chad Glasgow (6th season)
- Base defense: 4–2–5
- Home stadium: Amon G. Carter Stadium

2020 Big 12 Conference football standings
	Conf.			Overall
Team	W		L	W		L
No. 9 Iowa State y	8	–	1	9	–	3
No. 6 Oklahoma y$	6	–	2	9	–	2
No. 20 Oklahoma State	6	–	3	8	–	3
No. 19 Texas	5	–	3	7	–	3
TCU	5	–	4	6	–	4
West Virginia	4	–	4	6	–	4
Kansas State	4	–	5	4	–	6
Texas Tech	3	–	6	4	–	6
Baylor	2	–	7	2	–	7
Kansas	0	–	8	0	–	9
Championship: Oklahoma 27, Iowa State 21
$ – Conference champion; y – Championship game participant; Rankings from AP Poll.

The 2020 TCU Horned Frogs football team represented Texas Christian University (TCU) during the 2020 NCAA Division I FBS football season. The Horned Frogs competed as a member of the Big 12 Conference and played their home games at Amon G. Carter Stadium on campus in Fort Worth, Texas. They were led by 20th-year head coach Gary Patterson.

In a season impacted by the COVID-19 pandemic, the Horned Frogs compiled a 6–4 record (5–4 in conference). The team was slated to face Arkansas in the Texas Bowl, but had to withdraw due to COVID-19 issues within the program.

== Offseason ==
=== Coaching changes ===
In December 2019, co-offensive coordinator and running backs coach Curtis Luper was hired as the offensive coordinator at Missouri. The other co-offensive coordinator, Sonny Cumbie, was promoted to offensive coordinator. Brian Applewhite was hired to fill his role as running backs coach.

== Preseason ==
=== Big 12 media days ===
The Big 12 media days were held on July 21–22, 2020 in a virtual format due to the COVID-19 pandemic.

=== Big 12 media poll ===
Big 12 media poll
Predicted finish	Team	Votes (1st place)
1	Oklahoma	80
2	Oklahoma State	6
3	Texas	4
4	Iowa State	
5	Baylor	
6	TCU	
7	Kansas State	
8	West Virginia	
9	Texas Tech	
10	Kansas	

== Schedule ==
TCU released its 2020 schedule on October 22, 2019. The 2020 schedule consists of 6 home games and 6 away games in the regular season. The Horned Frogs will host 1 non-conference game against Prairie View A&M and will travel to non-conference games at California and SMU. TCU will host Oklahoma State, Kansas State, Oklahoma, Iowa State, and Texas Tech and travel to West Virginia, Baylor, Texas, and Kansas in regular season conference play.

The Horned Frogs scheduled games against Cal, Prairie View A&M, were canceled due to the COVID-19 pandemic.

Date	Time	Opponent	Site	TV	Result	Attendance
September 26	12:30 p.m.	Iowa State	Amon G. Carter Stadium; Fort Worth, TX	FS1	L 34–37	11,852
October 3	11:00 a.m.	at No. 9 Texas	Darrell K Royal–Texas Memorial Stadium; Austin, TX (rivalry)	FOX	W 33–31	17,753
October 10	3:00 p.m.	Kansas State^{†}	Amon G. Carter Stadium; Fort Worth, TX	FOX	L 14–21	12,208
October 24	11:00 a.m.	Oklahoma	Amon G. Carter Stadium; Fort Worth, TX	ABC	L 14–33	12,440
October 31	2:30 p.m.	at Baylor	McLane Stadium; Waco, TX (rivalry)	ESPN2	W 33–23	11,667
November 7	2:30 p.m.	Texas Tech	Amon G. Carter Stadium; Fort Worth, TX (rivalry)	FS1	W 34–18	12,356
November 14	11:00 a.m.	at West Virginia	Milan Puskar Stadium; Morgantown, WV	FOX	L 6–24	11,111
November 28	7:00 p.m.	at Kansas	David Booth Kansas Memorial Stadium; Lawrence, KS	FS1	W 59–23	N/A
December 5	11:00 a.m.	No. 15 Oklahoma State	Amon G. Carter Stadium; Fort Worth, TX	ESPN2	W 29–22	12,594
December 12	6:00 p.m.	Louisiana Tech*	Amon G. Carter Stadium; Fort Worth, TX	FS1	W 52–10	10,472
*Non-conference game; ^{†}Homecoming; Rankings from AP Poll and CFP Rankings (after November 24) released prior to game; All times are in Central time

Schedule source:

== Coaching staff ==
Coach	Title	Year at TCU	Previous job
Gary Patterson	Head coach	22nd	New Mexico (DC/S)
Sonny Cumbie	OC/QB	7th	Texas Tech (co-OC)
Chad Glasgow	DC/LB	8th	Texas Tech (DC)
Bryan Applewhite	RB	1st	Colorado State (RB)
Jarrett Anderson	OL	23rd	Tyler Junior College (RB/WR)
Shawn Bell	TE	4th	Cedar Ridge High School (HC)
Zarnell Fitch	DL	7th	Lincoln High School (HC)
Paul Gonzales	S	9th	Pacific University (DB)
Malcolm Kelly	WR	2nd	Houston (offensive analyst)
Doug Meacham	WR/TE	1st	St. Louis BattleHawks (OC)
Jeremy Modkins	CB	14th	None
Dan Sharp	DL	20th	Tulsa (TE/ST)

== Players drafted into the NFL ==
Round	Pick	Player	Position	NFL Club
2	43	Trevon Moehrig	SS	Las Vegas Raiders
5	170	Garret Wallow	LB	Houston Texans
