= Kene Nwangwu =

American football player (born 1998)

No. 3 – New York Jets
- Position: Running back
- Roster status: Active

Personal information
- Born: February 9, 1998 (age 28); Irving, Texas, U.S.
- Listed height: 6 ft 1 in (1.85 m)
- Listed weight: 210 lb (95 kg)

Career information
- High school: Heritage (Frisco, Texas)
- College: Iowa State (2016–2020)
- NFL draft: 2021: 4th round, 119th overall pick

Career history
- Minnesota Vikings (2021–2023); New Orleans Saints (2024)*; New York Jets (2024–present)
- * Offseason or practice squad member only

Awards and highlights
- Second-team All-Pro (2022) (Note: Selected as a kick returner); PFWA All-Rookie Team (2021)

Career NFL statistics as of 2025
- Rushing yards: 137
- Rushing average: 3.4
- Receptions: 6
- Receiving yards: 30
- Return yards: 2,640
- Total touchdowns: 5
- Stats at Pro Football Reference

Kene Nwangwu (born February 9, 1998) is an American professional football running back for the New York Jets of the National Football League (NFL). He played college football for the Iowa State Cyclones.

== Early life ==
Nwangwu was born in Irving to Jerome and Ogonna Nwangwu, immigrants from Nigeria. He went to Heritage High School in Frisco, Texas. He has a brother, Emeka.

== College career ==
Nwangwu played for the Iowa State Cyclones of Iowa State University from 2016 to 2020. He led the Big 12 Conference in kickoff returns and kickoff return yards in the 2016 season. Due to an Achilles injury, he used a redshirt for the 2017 season.

== Professional career ==
Pre-draft measurables
Height	Weight	Arm length	Hand span	Wingspan	40-yard dash	10-yard split	20-yard split	20-yard shuttle	Three-cone drill	Vertical jump	Broad jump	Bench press
6 ft 0 1/8 in (1.83 m)	210 lb (95 kg)	30 1/2 in (0.77 m)	9 1/4 in (0.23 m)	6 ft 2 5/8 in (1.90 m)	4.31 s	1.45 s	2.56 s	4.25 s	6.83 s	38.0 in (0.97 m)	10 ft 5 in (3.18 m)	22 reps
All values from Pro Day

=== Minnesota Vikings ===
Nwangwu was drafted by the Minnesota Vikings in the fourth round, 119th overall, of the 2021 NFL draft. On May 15, 2021, he signed his rookie contract with Minnesota, worth $4.23 million with a $752K signing bonus. Nwangwu was placed on injured reserve on September 1. He was activated on October 19. Nwangwu's first NFL touchdown was a 98-yard kick-off return for a touchdown against the Baltimore Ravens in Week 9, earning National Football Conference (NFC) Special Teams Player of the Week. Three weeks later in Week 12 against the San Francisco 49ers, Nwangwu returned another kick for a touchdown, this one being 99 yards. As a rookie, he appeared in 11 games. Nwangwu was named to the Pro Football Writers of America All-Rookie Team.

In Week 12 of the 2022 season against the New England Patriots, he had another kickoff return for a 97-yard touchdown, earning NFC Special Teams Player of the Week. His 35 total kick returns in the 2022 tied with Keisean Nixon for the lead in the NFL. Overall, he appeared in all 17 games in a special teams role for the Vikings in the 2022 season.

On August 30, 2023, Nwangwu was placed on injured reserve. He was activated on October 18.

On August 27, 2024, Nwangwu was waived by the Vikings as a part of final roster cuts.

=== New Orleans Saints ===
On August 28, 2024, Nwangwu was claimed off waivers by the New Orleans Saints, but was waived the next day after failing his physical.

=== New York Jets ===
On September 9, 2024, Nwangwu signed with the New York Jets practice squad. During his debut with the team on December 1, Nwangwu returned a kick 99 yards for a touchdown in a 26–21 loss to the Seattle Seahawks. He was promoted to the active roster on December 2.

On March 19, 2025, Nwangwu re-signed with the Jets. In Week 10, Nwangwu had a 99-yard kickoff return for a touchdown in a 27-20 win over the Cleveland Browns, earning AFC Special Teams Player of the Week.

On March 19, 2026, Nwangwu re-signed with the Jets on a one-year, $2 million contract.
