= Spencer Tillman =

American football player (born 1964)

No. 33, 23, 32
- Position: Running back

Personal information
- Born: April 21, 1964 (age 62); Tulsa, Oklahoma, U.S.
- Listed height: 5 ft 11 in (1.80 m)
- Listed weight: 206 lb (93 kg)

Career information
- High school: Edison Preparatory School (Tulsa)
- College: Oklahoma
- NFL draft: 1987: 5th round, 133rd overall pick

Career history
- Houston Oilers (1987–1988); San Francisco 49ers (1989–1991); Houston Oilers (1992–1994)

Awards and highlights
- Super Bowl champion (XXIV); National champion (1985); Second-team All-Big Eight (1983); Orange Bowl MVP (1987); Big Eight Football Newcomer of the Year (1983)

Career NFL statistics
- Rushing yards: 181
- Rushing average: 4.5
- Touchdowns: 1
- Return yards: 670
- Stats at Pro Football Reference

Spencer Allen Tillman (born April 21, 1964) is an American former professional football player who played running back for eight seasons for the Houston Oilers and San Francisco 49ers of the National Football League (NFL). He played college football for the Oklahoma Sooners.

== College career ==
=== College football ===
Tillman was an All-American running back for the University of Oklahoma (1983–86) and was the captain of the 1985 National Championship team when it defeated Penn State, 25–10, in the Orange Bowl.

Tillman received several awards during his playing career, including UPI Player of the Year in the Big Eight Conference in 1982, Big Eight Football Newcomer of the Year in 1983 and MVP of the 1987 Orange Bowl. He was inducted into the Orange Bowl Hall of Fame in 2012.

=== Education ===
Tillman earned a bachelor's degree in journalism in 1986 and a bachelor's degree in communications in 1988 from the University of Oklahoma. He is a graduate of the Harvard Business School's & NFL's Business Management and Entrepreneurial Program.

== Professional football ==
=== Houston Oilers ===
Tillman was drafted in the 1987 NFL draft by the Houston Oilers as the 133rd overall pick in the fifth round. He played for the Oilers for two seasons (1987–88). Before an Oilers home game in October 1987, Tillman was riding in a Houston taxi cab when the driver was stricken and became unconscious. Tillman, who was sitting in the front seat, was able to stop the vehicle and administer CPR; after the driver was taken to the hospital for recovery, Tillman played in a 37-33 comeback win against the Atlanta Falcons.

=== San Francisco 49ers and Super Bowl XXIV ===
In the 1989 off-season, Tillman was traded to the San Francisco 49ers where he played for three seasons (1989–91). He was co-captain with Joe Montana and Ronnie Lott as part of the 49ers roster at Super Bowl XXIV when they defeated the AFC champion Denver Broncos.

=== Return to the Oilers ===
In 1992, Tillman was traded back to Houston, where he completed his playing career (1992–94).

== Sports broadcasting ==
=== Broadcasting ===
After being drafted by the Houston Oilers in 1987, Tillman worked as an anchor and reporter at KPRC-TV during the seven-month off-season. His football and broadcasting careers developed in tandem as he hosted two radio sports-talk shows and was a reporter and anchor for a radio PM magazine in Oklahoma City prior to his television jobs.

=== CBS Sports ===
Tillman joined CBS Sports in 1999 as lead studio analyst for College Football Today, the network's pre-game studio show. Tillman, who had served as WABC-TV's weekend sports anchor in New York from 1997 to 1999 and spent 10 years as a sports anchor for KPRC-TV Houston, was paired with Tim Brando at the College Football Today desk. Tillman and Brando also broadcast regional NFL games for CBS from 2000–2003. In the first three years, Tillman and Brando were the eighth team of the NFL games for CBS; however, after week 2 Tillman and Brando were demoted to the ninth team of the NFL games for CBS and were replaced by Bill Macatee and Jerry Glanville in the eighth team in 2003.

Tillman has also served for four years as a reporter for the Network's NCAA tournament coverage and is an anchor for regional broadcasts on Fox Sports Networks. He also served as host of DirecTV's "NFL Sunday Ticket."

=== Fox Sports ===
Starting in 2015 Tillman joined Fox Sports and reunited with Tim Brando on Fox CFB.

=== KGOW 1560 AM Houston ===
Tillman began duties as the voice of KGOW 1560 The Game, a Houston sports talk radio station, when the station launched its new format in August 2007. His role includes reading promotional copy for the station, as well as weekly on-air time during the football season.

=== KTRK ABC13 Houston ===
Tillman is a current co-host of KTRK's Houston Texans Inside the Game, a thirty-minute weekly post-game recap and analysis program that typically follows the station's local newscast on game days.
