= Tim Brando =

American sportscaster (born 1956)

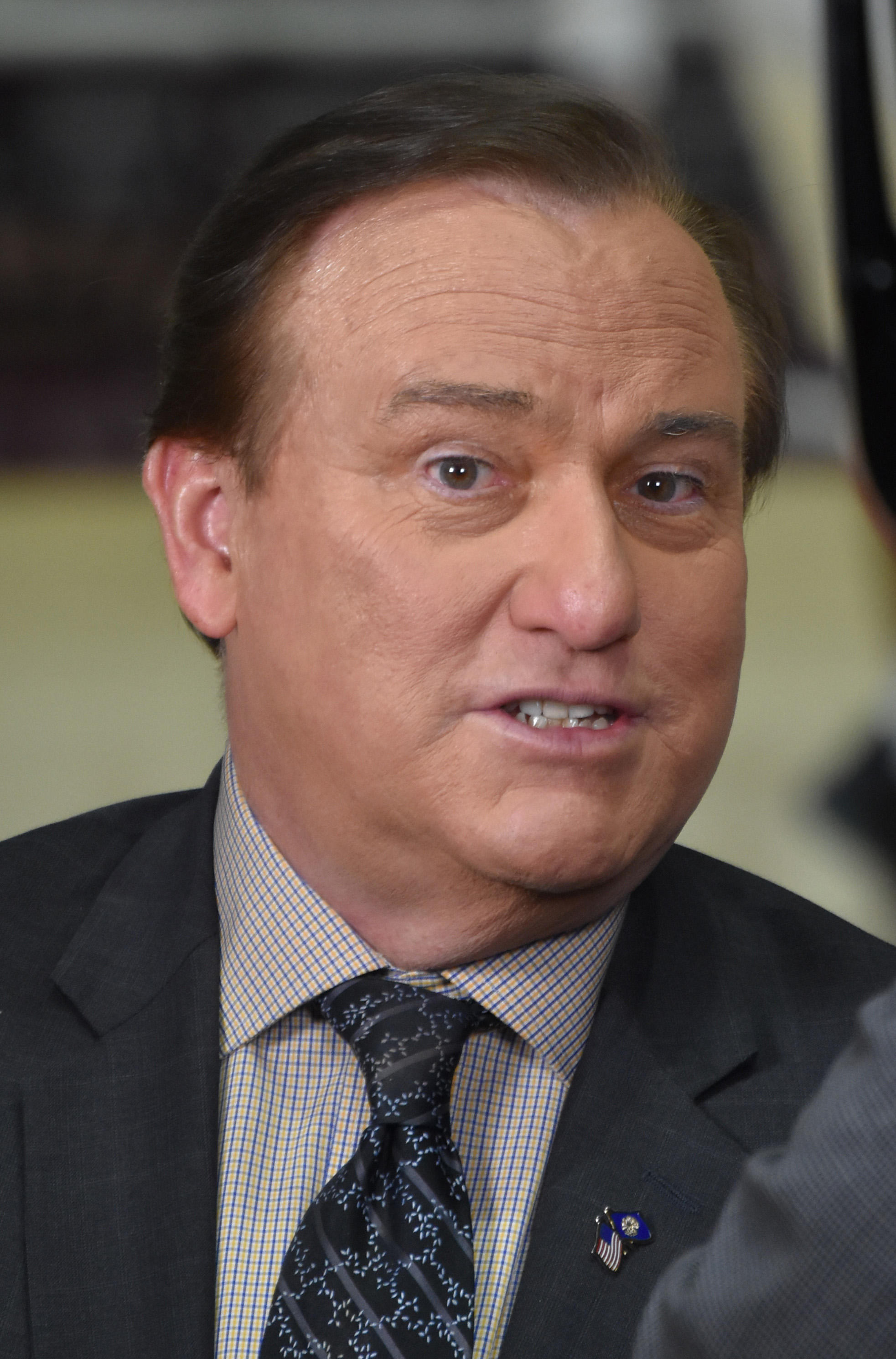
- Brando in 2019
- Born: February 27, 1956 (age 70); Shreveport, Louisiana, U.S.
- Other name: Timmy B
- Education: Fair Park High School, University of Louisiana at Monroe
- Occupation: Sports announcer
- Spouse: Terri Glorioso Brando
- Children: Tiffany Brando Crews and Tara Brando Sullivan

Tim Brando (born February 27, 1956) is an American sportscaster with Fox Sports. Formerly with Raycom Sports, ESPN, SiriusXM and CBS Sports, Brando has primarily covered NCAA football, basketball and the NBA. Along with radio duties, he’s also served as a studio host for games, a play-by-play announcer and halftime host.

== Career ==
=== Early career ===
In 1976 Brando was a disc jockey at radio station KROK-FM in his native Shreveport, Louisiana. From 1981 to 1986, Brando was the assistant sports director at WAFB-TV in Baton Rouge; he did telecasts of Louisiana State University men's and women's basketball on Tigervision.

=== ESPN ===
From 1986 to 1994, he served as a studio host for SportsCenter, for ESPN's college football halftime show, and for the network's coverage of the NCAA Men's Basketball Championship. In 1994, he provided play-by-play for TNT's coverage of the NBA Playoffs. Brando also called Atlanta Hawks and Atlanta Braves games for SportSouth. Brando also auditioned for the daytime version of Wheel of Fortune after Pat Sajak resigned to concentrate on his self-titled talk show. Ultimately, the hosting job went to Rolf Benirschke.

=== CBS ===
In 1996, Brando joined CBS Sports and began calling NCAA Men's Division I Basketball Championship games. Three years later, he added hosting duties on College Football Today, as CBS was then the broadcast network home of SEC football. He also provided play-by-play for the NFL on CBS from 1998 to 2003. The first five years of the sixth season is the eighth team, and the final year of the sixth season is the ninth team of NFL on CBS.

Brando called the four first-round games in Tampa, Florida, during the 2008 NCAA Men's Division I Basketball Tournament where for the first time ever, all four lower seeded teams won in the same venue on the same day.

=== Fox ===
On June 25, 2014, Fox Sports announced that it had hired Brando to serve as a play-by-play voice for college football and college basketball games on Fox and Fox Sports 1 starting in fall 2014. He was also named as a backup NFL announcer for Fox in October of that year. He called an NFL game for Fox on October 19, 2014, the Minnesota Vikings at the Buffalo Bills.

=== Regional sports television ===
In addition to his network duties, Brando called games for Raycom's coverage of the Atlantic Coast Conference basketball telecasts. Brando also hosts Raycom's Emmy Award-winning show, "Football Saturdays."

=== Broadcasting partners ===
- Spencer Tillman
- Tony Barnhart
- Lou Holtz
- Mike Gminski
- Devin Gardner
- Joe Dean, Jr
- Drew Brees

== Personal life ==
Brando's father, Hub, was a broadcaster at radio station KCIJ in Shreveport. Tim Brando graduated in 1974 from Fair Park High School in Shreveport. He then attended Northeast Louisiana University in Monroe (now the University of Louisiana at Monroe). He resides in Shreveport with his wife of 41 years, Terri Glorioso Brando. The couple have two daughters and four grandchildren.

Media offices
Preceded by none	ESPN College GameDay host 1987–1988	Succeeded by Bob Carpenter
