= Darius Stills =

American football player and coach (born 1998)

Profile
- Position: Defensive tackle

Personal information
- Born: May 1, 1998 (age 28); Fairmont, West Virginia, U.S.
- Listed height: 6 ft 0 in (1.83 m)
- Listed weight: 278 lb (126 kg)

Career information
- High school: Fairmont Senior
- College: West Virginia
- NFL draft: 2021: undrafted

Career history
- Las Vegas Raiders (2021)*; Kansas City Chiefs (2022)*; Birmingham Stallions (2023)*; Massachusetts Pirates (2023); Montreal Alouettes (2023)*
- * Offseason or practice squad member only

Awards and highlights
- Consensus All-American (2020); Big 12 Defensive Lineman of the Year (2020); First-team All-Big 12 (2020)
- Stats at Pro Football Reference

Darius Stills (born May 1, 1998) is an American professional football defensive tackle. He played college football for the West Virginia Mountaineers.

== Early life ==
Stills attended Fairmont Senior High School in Fairmont, West Virginia. During his career, Stills had 191 tackles and 44 tackles for loss. He committed to West Virginia University to play college football.

== College career ==
Stills played in 21 total games his first two years at West Virginia, recording 13 tackles and one sack. He became a starter his junior year in 2019 and recorded 46 tackles and seven sacks. Prior to his senior season, Stills was selected the Big 12 Preseason Defensive Player of the Year.

== Professional career ==
Pre-draft measurables
Height	Weight	Arm length	Hand span	40-yard dash	10-yard split	20-yard split	20-yard shuttle	Three-cone drill	Vertical jump	Broad jump	Bench press
6 ft 0 1/2 in (1.84 m)	278 lb (126 kg)	32 1/4 in (0.82 m)	8 7/8 in (0.23 m)	4.98 s	1.71 s	2.81 s	4.49 s	7.18 s	32.5 in (0.83 m)	9 ft 2 in (2.79 m)	23 reps

=== Las Vegas Raiders ===
Stills signed with the Las Vegas Raiders as an undrafted free agent on May 7, 2021. He was waived/injured on August 24, 2021, and placed on injured reserve. He was released on August 26.

=== Kansas City Chiefs ===
On January 11, 2022, Stills signed a reserve/future contract with the Kansas City Chiefs. He was waived on May 10, 2022.

=== Birmingham Stallions ===
Stills signed with the Birmingham Stallions of the USFL on November 22, 2022. On March 27, 2023, Stills was released by the Stallions.

=== Massachusetts Pirates ===
Stills signed with the Massachusetts Pirates of the Indoor Football League (IFL) on May 19, 2023.

=== Montreal Alouettes ===
On July 27, 2023, Stills signed with the Montreal Alouettes of the Canadian Football League (CFL).

== Personal life ==
Several of Stills family members played in the NFL and Division I football. His brother Dante played alongside him at West Virginia and now plays defensive line for the Arizona Cardinals. Their father, Gary, played in the NFL for 10 years and also played for the Chiefs. Stills uncle, Ken, and cousin, Kenny also played in the NFL.
