= Sam Cosmi =

American football player (born 1999)

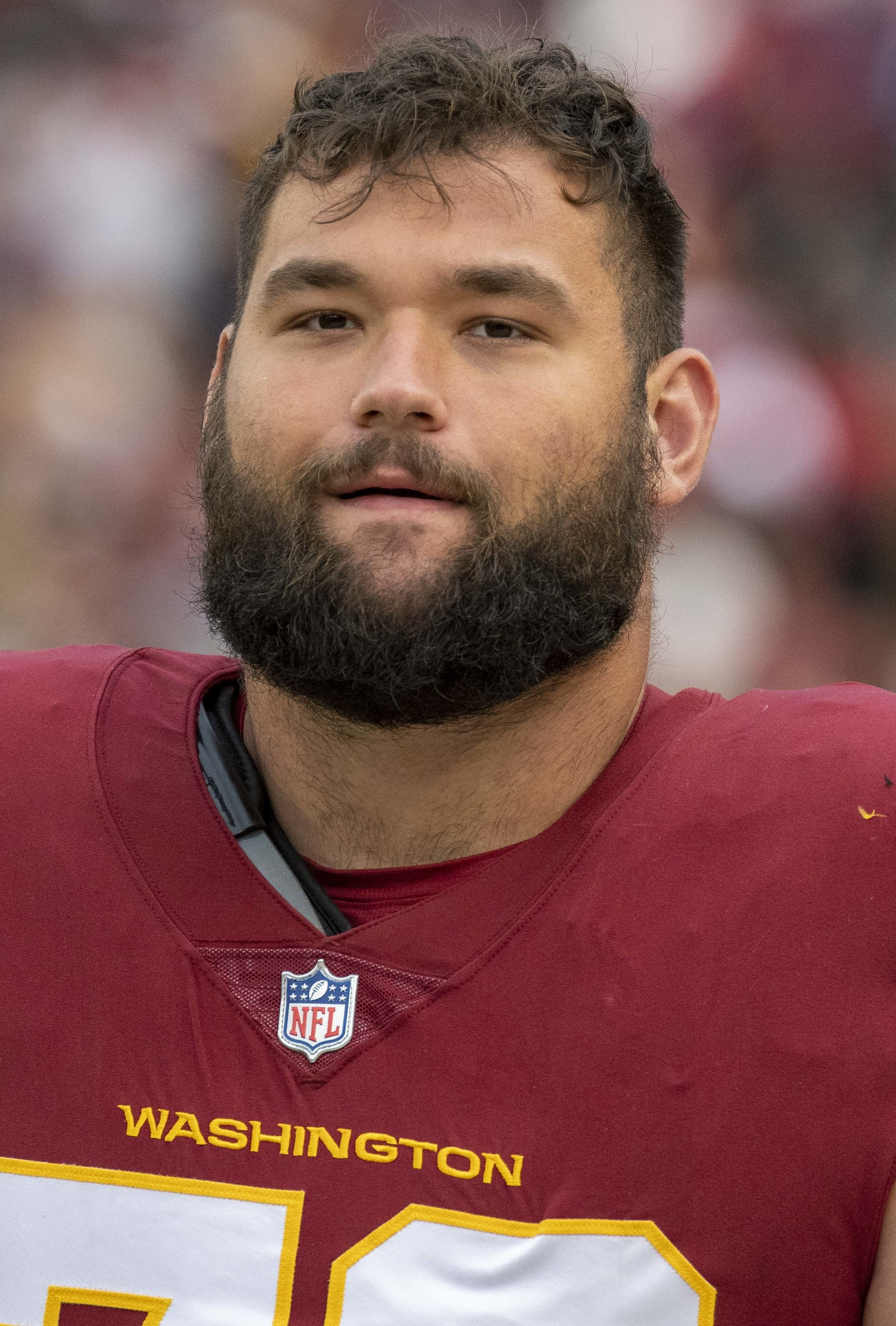
- Cosmi with the Washington Football Team in 2021

No. 76 – Washington Commanders
- Position: Guard
- Roster status: Active

Personal information
- Born: February 16, 1999 (age 27); Humble, Texas, U.S.
- Listed height: 6 ft 7 in (2.01 m)
- Listed weight: 309 lb (140 kg)

Career information
- High school: Atascocita (Harris County, Texas)
- College: Texas (2017–2020)
- NFL draft: 2021: 2nd round, 51st overall pick

Career history
- Washington Football Team / Commanders (2021–present)

Awards and highlights
- Third-team All-American (2020); First-team All-Big 12 (2020); 2019 Sugar Bowl champion; 2019 Alamo Bowl champion

Career NFL statistics as of Week 5, 2026
- Games played: 69
- Games started: 61
- Stats at Pro Football Reference

Samuel Cosmi (born February 16, 1999) is an American professional football guard for the Washington Commanders of the National Football League (NFL). He played college football for the Texas Longhorns and was selected by Washington in the second round of the 2021 NFL draft.

== Early life ==
Cosmi was born in Humble, Texas, on February 16, 1999. Cosmi played football at Atascocita High School, where he was named to the first-team All-District 21-6A and second team 6A All-State as a senior. Rated a three-star recruit, Cosmi committed to play college football at Houston over offers from TCU and Memphis but flipped his commitment to Texas after Houston coach Tom Herman was hired by the school.

== College career ==
Cosmi redshirted his freshman season at Texas. He played in all 14 of Texas's games as a redshirt freshman and started the last 13 at right tackle and was named an All-Big 12 Honorable mention by the coaches. He helped the team reach the 2018 Big 12 Championship game and upset Georgia in the 2019 Sugar Bowl.

He started all 13 games as a redshirt sophomore and was named second-team All-Big 12 Conference. He was also an Offensive Lineman of the Year honorable mention. That season he helped the Longhorns win the Alamo Bowl and finish ranked in the top 25. In a game against the West Virginia Mountaineers that season, he caught a lateral pitched to him by Sam Ehlinger and ran 12 yards for a touchdown, which set the record for the longest TD run by an offensive lineman in Big 12 history. Cosmi considered entering the 2020 NFL draft, but opted to return to Texas for his redshirt junior season.

Cosmi was a team captain in 2020. He started the first eight games of the COVID-19 shortened 2020 season before opting out of the remainder of Texas' games in order to prepare for the 2021 NFL draft. He was a unanimous first-team All-Big 12 selection, second team Academic All-Big 12, an Honorable Mention for the Offensive Lineman of the Year award, and a 3rd Team AP All-American.

== Professional career ==
Pre-draft measurables
| Height | Weight | Arm length | Hand span | Wingspan | 40-yard dash | 10-yard split | 20-yard split | 20-yard shuttle | Three-cone drill | Vertical jump | Broad jump | Bench press |
|---|---|---|---|---|---|---|---|---|---|---|---|---|
| 6 ft 5 7/8 in (1.98 m) | 314 lb (142 kg) | 33 in (0.84 m) | 10 1/4 in (0.26 m) | 6 ft 8 1/4 in (2.04 m) | 4.85 s | 1.68 s | 2.67 s | 4.39 s | 7.35 s | 30.0 in (0.76 m) | 9 ft 9 in (2.97 m) | 36 reps |
All values from Pro Day

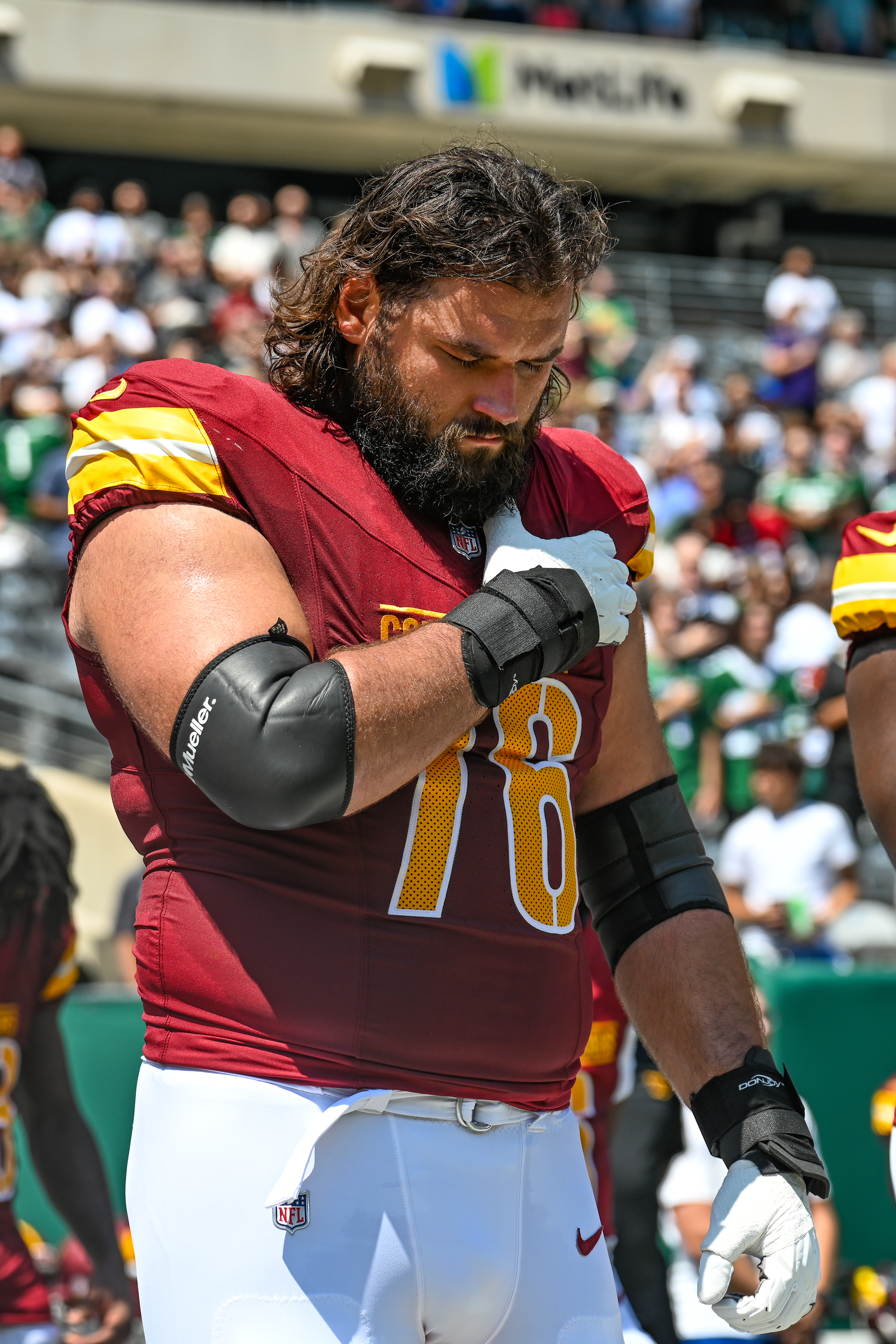
Cosmi in 2024

Cosmi was selected by the Washington Football Team in the second round (51st overall) of the 2021 NFL draft. He signed his four-year rookie contract on May 13, 2021.

=== 2021 ===
Cosmi was named the starting right tackle during training camp and made his professional debut in the opening game of the season. In the second quarter, Cosmi left the Week 5 game against the New Orleans Saints with an ankle injury. Cosmi missed the next four games until he returned against the Carolina Panthers in Week 11. He left that game early due to a hip injury and would eventually be placed on injured reserve on November 29, 2021. He was reactivated to the active roster on December 20 and finished out the season, though he missed the week 17 game against Philadelphia due to Covid. He played in nine total games total, all of which he started.

=== 2022 ===
Cosmi underwent thumb surgery following Week 4 of the 2022 season. After missing three games, Cosmi played with a club on his hand in Week 8 but in a reserve role with the Commanders choosing to stick with Cornelius Lucas as the starting right tackle. In Week 13 against the New York Giants, he started at right guard before leaving in the third quarter with an ankle injury. He was again the starter for the last game of the year. He played in 14 games that season, starting 6 and playing more than half the team's offensive snaps.

=== 2023 ===
Cosmi remained at right guard for the 2023 season. He managed to remain healthy all season, starting all 17 games and playing in nearly 100% of the team's offensive snaps.

=== 2024 ===
On September 4, 2024, Cosmi signed a four-year contract extension worth $74 million with $45 million guaranteed. Cosmi again stayed healthy through the 2024 regular season and started at right guard for all 17 games; but he left in the first half of the Divisional round game against the Detroit Lions due to a knee injury. It was confirmed the next day that Cosmi tore his ACL and would be out for the remainder of the 2024-25 playoffs. He had surgery in early February, 2025.

=== 2025 ===
On July 23, 2025, the Commanders placed Cosmi on the active/physically unable to perform (PUP) list for the start of training camp. He remained on the reserve/PUP list at the start of the season. Cosmi was activated on October 18, ahead of Washington's Week 7 matchup against the Dallas Cowboys. On December 22, the Commanders placed Cosmi on season-ending injured reserve due to a concussion.

==== 2026 ====
In Week 2 of the 2026 season against the Dallas Cowboys, Cosmi left the game in the fourth quarter with a concussion due to his own teammate, running back Kaytron Allen, colliding into him on a helmet-to-helmet hit.

== Personal life ==
Cosmi's parents immigrated from Romania to the United States in the early 1980s. He is a Christian. Cosmi married his wife Blair, whom he met at the University of Texas at Austin, in March 2023. They have two children together, a daughter who was born in 2024 and a son in 2025.
