= Ronnie Perkins =

American football player (born 1999)

Profile
- Position: Linebacker

Personal information
- Born: September 29, 1999 (age 27); St. Louis, Missouri, U.S.
- Listed height: 6 ft 3 in (1.91 m)
- Listed weight: 253 lb (115 kg)

Career information
- High school: Lutheran North (St. Louis)
- College: Oklahoma (2018–2020)
- NFL draft: 2021: 3rd round, 96th overall pick

Career history
- New England Patriots (2021–2023); Denver Broncos (2023–2024); Arizona Cardinals (2024)*; Birmingham Stallions (2025); Atlanta Falcons (2025)*; Birmingham Stallions (2026)*
- * Offseason or practice squad member only

Awards and highlights
- 2× Second-team All-Big 12 (2019, 2020)

Career NFL statistics as of 2025
- Total tackles: 13
- Games played: 7
- Stats at Pro Football Reference

Ronnie Perkins (born September 29, 1999) is an American professional football linebacker. He played college football at Oklahoma, and was selected by the New England Patriots in the third round of the 2021 NFL draft.

== Early life ==
Perkins attended Lutheran High School North in St. Louis, Missouri. As a senior in 2017, he was named the St. Louis Post-Dispatch All-Metro football defensive player of the year. He played in the 2018 U.S. Army All-American Bowl. Perkins committed to the University of Oklahoma to play college football.

== College career ==
As a true freshman at Oklahoma in 2018, Perkins started seven games and recorded 37 tackles and five sacks. He started all 13 games he played in his sophomore year before being suspended for the 2019 Peach Bowl due to a failed drug test. He finished the season with 38 tackles and six sacks. The suspension continued five games into his junior year in 2020.

== Professional career ==
Pre-draft measurables
Height	Weight	Arm length	Hand span	40-yard dash	10-yard split	20-yard split	20-yard shuttle	Vertical jump	Broad jump	Bench press
6 ft 2 1/2 in (1.89 m)	253 lb (115 kg)	32 7/8 in (0.84 m)	9 in (0.23 m)	4.71 s	1.69 s	2.79 s	4.69 s	32.0 in (0.81 m)	9 ft 7 in (2.92 m)	25 reps
All values from Pro Day

=== New England Patriots ===
Perkins was selected by the New England Patriots in the third round, 96th overall, of the 2021 NFL draft. On July 20, 2021, Perkins signed his four-year rookie contract with New England. After being inactive the first 13 games of the season, he was placed on injured reserve on December 17 without being active for a game as a rookie. On August 23, 2022, Perkins was placed on injured reserve. On August 29, 2023, Perkins was released by the Patriots and re-signed to the practice squad the following day.

=== Denver Broncos ===
On September 18, 2023, Perkins was signed by the Denver Broncos. He was waived on December 14 and re-signed to the practice squad. Perkins signed a reserve/future contract with Denver on January 8, 2024. On August 6, Perkins was designated as waived/injured by the Broncos, and reverted to injured reserve the following day after going unclaimed on waivers. On September 17, Perkins was released by the Broncos.

=== Arizona Cardinals ===
On October 16, 2024, Perkins signed with the Arizona Cardinals' practice squad. He was waived on December 3.

=== Birmingham Stallions ===
On February 4, 2025, Perkins signed with the Birmingham Stallions of the United Football League (UFL). He was placed on injured reserve on May 12.

=== Atlanta Falcons ===
On August 18, 2025, Perkins signed with the Atlanta Falcons. On August 23, Perkins was released by Atlanta during preliminary roster cuts and re-signed to the practice squad on September 2. He was released on September 9.

=== Birmingham Stallions (second stint) ===
On January 29, 2026, Perkins signed with the Birmingham Stallions. He was released three days later.
