= Jack Anderson (American football) =

American football player (born 1998)

Profile
- Position: Guard

Personal information
- Born: October 12, 1998 (age 28); Plano, Texas, U.S.
- Listed height: 6 ft 4 in (1.93 m)
- Listed weight: 314 lb (142 kg)

Career information
- High school: Frisco (Frisco, Texas)
- College: Texas Tech (2017–2020)
- NFL draft: 2021: 7th round, 236th overall pick

Career history
- Buffalo Bills (2021)*; Philadelphia Eagles (2021); New York Giants (2022); Indianapolis Colts (2023); Jacksonville Jaguars (2024)*; Carolina Panthers (2024)*; Dallas Cowboys (2024)*
- * Offseason or practice squad member only

Awards and highlights
- First-team All-Big 12 (2020); Second-team All-Big 12 (2018)

Career NFL statistics as of 2024
- Games played: 15
- Games started: 3
- Stats at Pro Football Reference

Jack Anderson (born October 12, 1998) is an American professional football guard. He was selected by the Buffalo Bills with the 236th pick of the 2021 NFL draft. He has also spent time with the Philadelphia Eagles, New York Giants, and Indianapolis Colts. He played college football for the Texas Tech Red Raiders.

== College career ==
Anderson was ranked as a four–star recruit by 247Sports.com coming out of high school. He committed to Texas Tech on October 5, 2015.

== Professional career ==
Pre-draft measurables
Height	Weight	Arm length	Hand span	40-yard dash	10-yard split	20-yard split	20-yard shuttle	Three-cone drill	Vertical jump	Broad jump	Bench press
6 ft 4 5/8 in (1.95 m)	314 lb (142 kg)	31 7/8 in (0.81 m)	9 7/8 in (0.25 m)	5.26 s	1.78 s	2.99 s	4.83 s	7.88 s	29.5 in (0.75 m)	8 ft 9 in (2.67 m)	27 reps
All values from Pro Day

=== Buffalo Bills ===
Anderson was selected by the Buffalo Bills in the seventh round with the 236th pick of the 2021 NFL draft on May 1, 2021. On May 13, Anderson signed his four-year rookie contract with Buffalo. He was waived on August 31, and re-signed to the practice squad the next day.

=== Philadelphia Eagles ===
On September 21, 2021, Anderson was signed off the Bills' practice squad to the Philadelphia Eagles active roster. He was placed on injured reserve on November 20. He was activated on December 21. He was waived on August 30, 2022, as part of the final roster cuts.

=== New York Giants ===
On August 31, 2022, Anderson was claimed off waivers by the New York Giants.

On February 15, 2023, Anderson re-signed on a one-year contract. He was waived on August 28.

=== Indianapolis Colts ===
On September 12, 2023, Anderson was signed to the Indianapolis Colts practice squad. He was signed to the active roster on October 31.

On March 5, 2024, Anderson signed a one-year contract extension with the Colts, but was waived on June 6.

=== Jacksonville Jaguars ===
On June 7, 2024, the Jacksonville Jaguars claimed Anderson off waivers but was released on June 12.

=== Carolina Panthers ===
On August 11, 2024, Anderson signed with the Carolina Panthers. He was waived on August 27.

=== Dallas Cowboys ===
On January 1, 2025, the Dallas Cowboys signed Anderson to their practice squad. He signed a reserve/future contract on January 6.

On April 30, 2025, Anderson was waived by the Cowboys.

== Personal life ==
Anderson is the son of Mark and Danielle Anderson. His sister also attended Texas Tech University.
