= Wyatt Hubert =

American football player (born 1998)

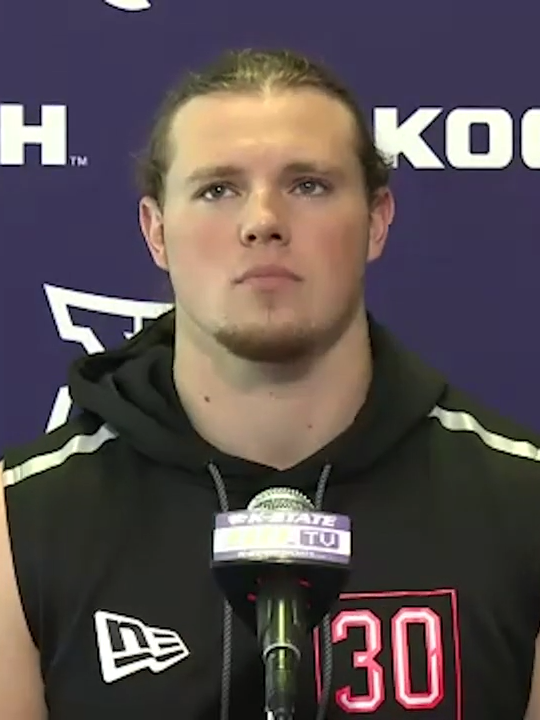
- Hubert in 2021

No. 56
- Position: Defensive end

Personal information
- Born: June 13, 1998 (age 28); Shawnee, Kansas, U.S.
- Listed height: 6 ft 3 in (1.91 m)
- Listed weight: 265 lb (120 kg)

Career information
- High school: Shawnee Heights (Tecumseh, Kansas)
- College: Kansas State (2017–2020)
- NFL draft: 2021: 7th round, 235th overall pick

Career history
- Cincinnati Bengals (2021)

Awards and highlights
- Freshman All-American (2018); 2× First-team All-Big 12 (2019, 2020)
- Stats at Pro Football Reference

Wyatt Anthony Hubert (born June 13, 1998) is an American former professional football player who was a defensive end in the National Football League (NFL). He played college football for the Kansas State Wildcats.

== Professional career ==
Pre-draft measurables
Height	Weight	Arm length	Hand span	40-yard dash	10-yard split	20-yard split	20-yard shuttle	Three-cone drill	Vertical jump	Broad jump
6 ft 2 7/8 in (1.90 m)	258 lb (117 kg)	31 in (0.79 m)	10 in (0.25 m)	4.89 s	1.71 s	2.75 s	4.28 s	7.03 s	32.5 in (0.83 m)	9 ft 2 in (2.79 m)
All values from Pro Day

Hubert was selected by the Cincinnati Bengals in the seventh round, 235th overall, of the 2021 NFL draft. He signed his four-year rookie contract with Cincinnati on May 17. On July 26, 2021, it was announced that Hubert had suffered a torn pectoral in the offseason. He was placed on the reserve/non-football injury list to start the 2021 season. Hubert announced his retirement on August 13, 2022. On February 28, 2023, he announced he was returning to football via Twitter.
