= Rodarius Williams =

American football player (born 1996)

No. 25
- Position: Cornerback

Personal information
- Born: September 12, 1996 (age 30); Shreveport, Louisiana, U.S.
- Listed height: 6 ft 0 in (1.83 m)
- Listed weight: 195 lb (88 kg)

Career information
- High school: Calvary Baptist Academy (Shreveport)
- College: Oklahoma State (2016–2020)
- NFL draft: 2021: 6th round, 201st overall pick

Career history
- New York Giants (2021–2022); Tampa Bay Buccaneers (2023)*
- * Offseason or practice squad member only

Awards and highlights
- Second-team All-Big 12 (2020)

Career NFL statistics
- Total tackles: 16
- Interceptions: 1
- Pass deflections: 2
- Stats at Pro Football Reference

Rodarius Lee Williams (born September 12, 1996) is an American former professional football player who was a cornerback in the National Football League (NFL). He played college football for the Oklahoma State Cowboys.

== Early life ==
Williams grew up in Shreveport, Louisiana, and attended Calvary Baptist Academy.

== College career ==
Williams was a member of the Cowboys at Oklahoma State University for five seasons, redshirting as a true freshman. He became a starter going into his redshirt freshman year. Williams was named second-team All-Big 12 Conference as a redshirt senior after allowing only nine pass completions and breaking up seven passes.

== Professional career ==
Pre-draft measurables
Height	Weight	Arm length	Hand span	40-yard dash	10-yard split	20-yard split	20-yard shuttle	Three-cone drill	Vertical jump	Broad jump	Bench press
5 ft 11 3/4 in (1.82 m)	189 lb (86 kg)	31 1/2 in (0.80 m)	9 1/8 in (0.23 m)	4.52 s	1.56 s	2.57 s	4.18 s	6.95 s	36.5 in (0.93 m)	10 ft 3 in (3.12 m)	14 reps
All values from Pro Day

=== New York Giants ===
In the 2021 NFL draft, Williams was selected in the sixth round (201st overall) by the New York Giants. On May 13, 2021, Williams officially signed with the Giants. He suffered a torn ACL in Week 5 and was ruled out for the season.

On August 31, 2022, Williams was placed on injured reserve. He was activated on November 14. Williams recorded his first career interception off of Dak Prescott in a Week 12 loss to the Dallas Cowboys.

On August 19, 2023, Williams was released.

=== Tampa Bay Buccaneers ===
On August 20, 2023, Williams was claimed off waivers by the Tampa Bay Buccaneers. He was waived by the Buccaneers on August 28.

== Personal life ==
Williams is the older brother of NFL defensive back Greedy Williams.
