= 2020 Big 12 Conference football season =

American college football season

- League: NCAA Division I FBS football season
- Sport: football
- Duration: September 3, 2020; January 2021
- Teams: 10
- TV partner(s): Fox Family (Fox, FS1, FSN), ESPN Family (ABC, ESPN, ESPN2, ESPN3, ESPNU, Big 12 Now, LHN)

2021 NFL Draft
- Top draft pick: Teven Jenkins (Oklahoma State)
- Picked by: Chicago Bears, 39th overall

Regular Season

Championship Game
- Champions: Oklahoma
- Runners-up: Iowa State
- Finals MVP: Spencer Rattler, Oklahoma

Seasons
- 2019 2021

2020 Big 12 Conference football standings
	Conf.			Overall
Team	W		L	W		L
No. 9 Iowa State y	8	–	1	9	–	3
No. 6 Oklahoma y$	6	–	2	9	–	2
No. 20 Oklahoma State	6	–	3	8	–	3
No. 19 Texas	5	–	3	7	–	3
TCU	5	–	4	6	–	4
West Virginia	4	–	4	6	–	4
Kansas State	4	–	5	4	–	6
Texas Tech	3	–	6	4	–	6
Baylor	2	–	7	2	–	7
Kansas	0	–	8	0	–	9
Championship: Oklahoma 27, Iowa State 21
$ – Conference champion; y – Championship game participant; Rankings from AP Poll.

The 2020 Big 12 Conference football season was the 25th season of the Big 12 Conference football, part of the 2020 NCAA Division I FBS football season. The season began on September 3, 2020, with non-conference play. Conference play began on September 19. The entire schedule was released on October 21, 2019.

The 2020 season was the ninth season for the Big 12 since the early 2010s conference realignment brought the Big 12 membership to its current form.

As a ten-team league, the Big 12 was scheduled to play a nine-game round-robin conference schedule and each member playing three non-conference games, one of which had to be against a Power Five conference foe. Due to the COVID-19 pandemic, all power five conference games were canceled, and each team will only play one non-conference game. The regular season will be followed by a conference championship game between the regular-season champion and the regular season runner-up.

The 2020 Big 12 Championship Game was played at AT&T Stadium in Arlington, Texas, on December 19, 2020, and ended with Oklahoma claiming their sixth Big 12 title in a row by defeating the Iowa State Cyclones, 27–21.

== Preseason ==
=== Big 12 media days ===
The 2020 Big 12 media days will be held on July 21–22 in Frisco, Texas.

=== Preseason poll ===
The preseason poll will be released in mid-July 2020.

=== Preseason awards ===
2019 Preseason All-Big 12

- Offensive Player of the Year: Chuba Hubbard, Oklahoma State
- Defensive Player of the Year: Darius Stills, West Virginia
- Newcomer of the Year: Spencer Rattler, Oklahoma

All-Big 12 Offense
Position	Player	Class	Team
QB	Sam Ehlinger	Sr.	Texas
RB	Pooka Williams Jr.	Jr.	Kansas
RB	Chuba Hubbard	Jr.	Oklahoma State
FB	Nick Lenners	Jr.	Kansas State
WR	Charleston Rambo	Jr.	Oklahoma
WR	Tylan Wallace	Jr.	Oklahoma State
WR	Andrew Parchment	Sr.	Kansas
TE	Charlie Kolar	Jr.	Iowa State
OL	Jack Anderson	Sr.	Texas Tech
OL	Creed Humphrey	Jr.	Oklahoma
OL	Sam Cosmi	Jr.	Texas
OL	Adrian Ealy	Jr.	Oklahoma
OL	Teven Jenkins	Sr.	Oklahoma State
PK	Gabe Brkic	So.	Oklahoma
KR/PR	Joshua Youngblood	So.	Kansas State

All-Big 12 Defense
Position	Player	Class	Team
DL	JaQuan Bailey	Sr.	Iowa State
DL	Wyatt Hubert	Jr.	Kansas State
DL	Ronnie Perkins	Jr.	Oklahoma
DL	Eli Howard	Sr.	Texas Tech
DL	Darius Stills	Sr.	West Virginia
LB	Terrel Bernard	Jr.	Baylor
LB	Garret Wallow	Sr.	TCU
LB	Joseph Ossai	Jr.	Texas
DB	Kolby Harvell-Peel	Jr.	Oklahoma State
DB	Trevon Moehrig	Jr.	TCU
DB	Caden Sterns	Jr.	Texas
DB	Greg Eisworth	Sr.	Iowa State
DB	D'Shawn Jamison	Jr.	Texas
P	Austin McNamara	So.	Texas Tech

== Head coaches ==
There was only one head coaching change in the conference following the conclusion of the 2019 season. On January 7, 2020, Baylor Bears coach Matt Rhule was hired as the new coach of the Carolina Panthers of the National Football League (NFL) after three years at the school. He was replaced by Dave Aranda on January 20, 2020.

Team	Head coach	Years at school	Overall record	Record at school	Big–12 record
Baylor	Dave Aranda	1	0–0	0–0	0–0
Iowa State	Matt Campbell	5	61–39	23–22	18–18
Kansas	Les Miles	2	145–64	3–9	17–24*
Kansas State	Chris Klieman	2	80–18	8–5	5–4
Oklahoma	Lincoln Riley	4	32–6	32–6	28–3
Oklahoma State	Mike Gundy	16	129–64	129–64	77–52
TCU	Gary Patterson	20	172–70	172–70	110–48
Texas	Tom Herman	4	47–19	19–13	17–11
Texas Tech	Matt Wells	2	48–42	4–8	2–7
West Virginia	Neal Brown	2	40–23	3–6	3–6

*Includes record from tenure at Oklahoma State

== Schedule ==
The regular season will begin on September 12, 2020 and will end on December 5, 2020. The season will conclude with the 2020 Big 12 Championship Game on December 19, 2020. The schedule is subject to changes due to the COVID-19 pandemic. Changes may include cancellation of individual games, cancellation of non-conference games, games played without fans in attendance, or the cancellation of the entire season. Multiple conferences have already canceled portions of or the entire season. As of August 8, 2020, fourteen non-conference games involving a Big 12 team have been canceled due to the pandemic. The Big 12 announced on August 3 that all teams will play 10 games, 9 conference games and 1 non-conference game. on August 12, the revised schedule was released

=== Regular season ===
Index to colors and formatting
Big 12 member won
Big 12 member lost
Big 12 teams in **bold**

==== Week One ====
Date	Time	Visiting team	Home team	Site	TV	Result	Attendance	Ref.
September 12	11:00 a.m.	Eastern Kentucky	West Virginia	Milan Puskar Stadium • Morgantown, WV	FS1	**W** 56–10	976	
September 12	11:00 a.m.	Louisiana	No. 23 Iowa State	Jack Trice Stadium • Ames, IA	ESPN	**L** 14–31	0	
September 12	11:00 a.m.	Arkansas State	Kansas State	Bill Snyder Family Stadium • Manhattan, KS	Fox	**L** 31–35	11,041	
September 12	6:00 p.m.	Missouri State	No. 5 Oklahoma	Gaylord Family Oklahoma Memorial Stadium • Norman, OK	PPV	**W** 48–0	22,700	
September 12	7:00 p.m.	Houston Baptist	Texas Tech	Jones AT&T Stadium • Lubbock, TX	ESPN+	**W** 35–33	11,157	
September 12	7:00 p.m.	UTEP	No. 14 Texas	Darrell K Royal–Texas Memorial Stadium • Austin, TX	LHN	**W** 59–3	15,337	
September 12	9:00 p.m.	Coastal Carolina	Kansas	David Booth Kansas Memorial Stadium • Lawrence, KS	FS1	**L** 23–38	0	
^{#}Rankings from AP Poll released prior to game. All times are in Central Time.

Date	Bye Week		
September 12	Baylor	Oklahoma State	TCU

==== Week Two ====
Date	Time	Visiting team	Home team	Site	TV	Result	Attendance	Ref.
September 19	11:00 a.m.	Tulsa	No. 11 **Oklahoma State**	Boone Pickens Stadium • Stillwater, OK (rivalry)	ESPN	**W** 16–7	14,668	
^{#}Rankings from AP Poll released prior to game. All times are in Central Time.

Date	Bye Week								
September 19	Baylor	Iowa State	Kansas	Kansas State	Oklahoma	TCU	Texas	Texas Tech	West Virginia

==== Week Three ====
Date	Time	Visiting team	Home team	Site	TV	Result	Attendance	Ref.
September 26	11:00 a.m.	**Kansas State**	**Oklahoma**	Gaylord Family Oklahoma Memorial Stadium • Norman, OK	FOX	**KSU** 38–35	33,700	
September 26	12:30 p.m.	**Iowa State**	**TCU**	Amon G. Carter Stadium • Fort Worth, TX	FS1	**ISU** 37–34	11,852	
September 26	2:30 p.m.	**West Virginia**	**Oklahoma State**	Boone Pickens Stadium • Stillwater, OK	ABC	**OKST** 27–13	14,672	
September 26	2:30 p.m.	**Texas**	**Texas Tech**	Jones AT&T Stadium • Lubbock, TX (rivalry)	FOX	**TEX** 63–56 ^{OT}	16,615	
September 26	6:30 p.m.	**Kansas**	**Baylor**	McLane Stadium • Waco, TX	ESPNU	**BAY** 47–14	11,667	
^{#}Rankings from AP Poll released prior to game. All times are in Central Time.

==== Week Four ====
Date	Time	Visiting team	Home team	Site	TV	Result	Attendance	Ref.
October 3	11:00 a.m.	**Baylor**	**West Virginia**	Milan Puskar Stadium • Morgantown, WV	ABC	**WVU** 27-21 2OT	978	
October 3	11:00 a.m.	**TCU**	**No. 9 Texas**	Darrell K Royal–Texas Memorial Stadium • Austin, TX	FOX	**TCU** 33-31	17,753	
October 3	2:30 p.m.	**No. 17 Oklahoma State**	**Kansas**	David Booth Kansas Memorial Stadium • Lawrence, KS	ESPN	**OKST** 47-7	9,480	
October 3	2:30 p.m.	**Texas Tech**	**Kansas State**	Bill Snyder Family Stadium • Manhattan, KS	FS1	**KSU** 31-21	10,932	
October 3	6:30 p.m.	**No. 18 Oklahoma**	**Iowa State**	Jack Trice Stadium • Ames, IA	ABC	**ISU** 37-30	13,724	
^{#}Rankings from AP Poll released prior to game. All times are in Central Time.

==== Week Five ====
Date	Time	Visiting team	Home team	Site	TV	Result	Attendance	Ref.
October 10	11:00 a.m.	**No. 22 Texas**	**Oklahoma**	Cotton Bowl • Dallas, TX (Red River Showdown)	FOX	**OKLA** 53–45 ^{4OT}	24,000	
October 10	2:30 p.m.	**Texas Tech**	**No. 24 Iowa State**	Jack Trice Stadium • Ames, IA	ABC	**ISU** 31-15	13,502	
October 10	3:00 p.m.	**Kansas State**	**TCU**	Amon G. Carter Stadium • Fort Worth, TX	FOX	**KSU** 21-14	12,208	
^{#}Rankings from AP Poll released prior to game. All times are in Central Time.

Date	Bye Week			
October 10	Baylor	Kansas	Oklahoma State	West Virginia

==== Week Six ====
Date	Time	Visiting team	Home team	Site	TV	Result	Attendance	Ref.
October 17	11:00 a.m.	**Kansas**	**West Virginia**	Milan Puskar Stadium • Morgantown, WV	FOX	**WVU** 38–17	10,759	
^{#}Rankings from AP Poll released prior to game. All times are in Central Time.

Date	Bye Week							
October 17	Baylor	Iowa State	Kansas State	Oklahoma	Oklahoma State	TCU	Texas	Texas Tech

==== Week Seven ====
Date	Time	Visiting team	Home team	Site	TV	Result	Attendance	Ref.
October 24	11:00 a.m.	**Oklahoma**	**TCU**	Amon G. Carter Stadium • Fort Worth, TX	ABC	**OKLA** 33-14	12,440	
October 24	11:00 a.m.	**Kansas**	**No. 20 Kansas State**	Bill Snyder Family Stadium • Manhattan, KS (rivalry)	FS1	**KSU** 55-14	10,801	
October 24	2:30 p.m.	**No. 17 Iowa State**	**No. 6 Oklahoma State**	Boone Pickens Stadium • Stillwater, OK	FOX	**OKST** 24-21	14,671	
October 24	2:30 p.m.	**Baylor**	**Texas**	Darrell K Royal–Texas Memorial Stadium • Austin, TX	ESPN	**TEX** 27-16	18,202	
October 24	4:30 p.m.	**West Virginia**	**Texas Tech**	Jones AT&T Stadium • Lubbock, TX	ESPN2	**TTU** 34-27	13,532	
^{#}Rankings from AP Poll released prior to game. All times are in Central Time.

==== Week Eight ====
Date	Time	Visiting team	Home team	Site	TV	Result	Attendance	Ref.
October 31	11:00 a.m.	**No. 23 Iowa State**	**Kansas**	David Booth Kansas Memorial Stadium • Lawrence, KS	FS1	**ISU** 52-22	9,652	
October 31	11:00 a.m.	**No. 16 Kansas State**	**West Virginia**	Milan Puskar Stadium • Morgantown, WV	ESPN2	**WVU** 37-10	10,441	
October 31	2:30 p.m.	**TCU**	**Baylor**	McLane Stadium • Waco, TX	ESPN2	**TCU** 33-23	11,667	
October 31	3:00 p.m.	**Texas**	**No. 6 Oklahoma State**	Boone Pickens Stadium • Stillwater, OK	FOX	**TEX** 41-34 ^{OT}	14,672	
October 31	7:00 p.m.	**No. 24 Oklahoma**	**Texas Tech**	Jones AT&T Stadium • Lubbock, TX	FOX	**OKLA** 62-28	14,431	
^{#}Rankings from AP Poll released prior to game. All times are in Central Time.

==== Week Nine ====
Date	Time	Visiting team	Home team	Site	TV	Result	Attendance	Ref.
November 7	11:00 a.m.	**West Virginia**	**No. 22 Texas**	Darrell K Royal–Texas Memorial Stadium • Austin, TX	ABC	**TEX** 17-13	17,843	
November 7	2:30 p.m.	**Kansas**	**No 19 Oklahoma**	Gaylord Family Oklahoma Memorial Stadium • Norman, OK	ESPN	**OKLA** 62-9	22,700	
November 7	2:30 p.m.	**Texas Tech**	**TCU**	Amon G. Carter Stadium • Fort Worth, TX	FS1	**TCU** 34-18	12,356	
November 7	3:00 p.m.	**No. 14 Oklahoma State**	**Kansas State**	Bill Snyder Family Stadium • Manhattan, KS	FOX	**OSU** 20-18	11,980	
November 7	6:00 p.m.	**Baylor**	**No. 17 Iowa State**	Jack Trice Stadium • Ames, IA	FS1	**ISU** 38-31	13,535	
^{#}Rankings from AP Poll released prior to game. All times are in Central Time.

==== Week Ten ====
Date	Time	Visiting team	Home team	Site	TV	Result	Attendance	Ref.
November 14	11:00 a.m.	**TCU**	**West Virginia**	Milan Puskar Stadium • Morgantown, WV	FOX	**WVU** 24-6	11,111	
November 14	3:00 p.m.	**Baylor**	**Texas Tech**	Jones AT&T Stadium • Lubbock, TX	FS1	**TTU** 24-23	12,914	
^{#}Rankings from AP Poll released prior to game. All times are in Central Time.

Date	Bye Week					
November 14	Iowa State	Kansas	Kansas State	Oklahoma	Oklahoma State	Texas

==== Week Eleven ====
Date	Time	Visiting team	Home team	Site	TV	Result	Attendance	Ref.
November 21	3:00 p.m.	**Kansas State**	**No. 17 Iowa State**	Jack Trice Stadium • Ames, IA	FOX	**ISU** 45-0	0	
November 21	6:30 p.m.	**No. 14 Oklahoma State**	**No. 18 Oklahoma**	Gaylord Family Oklahoma Memorial Stadium • Norman, OK (Bedlam)	ABC	**OKLA** 41-13	22,700	
^{#}Rankings from AP Poll released prior to game. All times are in Central Time.

Date	Bye Week					
November 21	Baylor	Kansas	TCU	Texas	Texas Tech	West Virginia

==== Week Twelve ====
Date	Time	Visiting team	Home team	Site	TV	Result	Attendance	Ref.
November 27	11:00 a.m.	**No. 15 Iowa State**	**No. 20 Texas**	Darrell K Royal–Texas Memorial Stadium • Austin, TX	ABC	**ISU** 23-20	16,555	
November 28	6:00 p.m.	**Kansas State**	**Baylor**	McLane Stadium • Waco, TX	ESPN2	**BU** 32-31	11,667	
November 28	11:00 a.m.	**Texas Tech**	**No. 23 Oklahoma State**	Boone Pickens Stadium • Stillwater, OK	FOX	**OSU** 50-44	14,645	
November 28	7:00 p.m.	**TCU**	**Kansas**	David Booth Kansas Memorial Stadium • Lawrence, KS	FS1	**TCU** 59-23	0	
^{#}Rankings from AP Poll released prior to game. All times are in Central Time.

==== Week Thirteen ====
Date	Time	Visiting team	Home team	Site	TV	Result	Attendance	Ref.
December 5	2:30 p.m	**West Virginia**	**No. 12 Iowa State**	Jack Trice Stadium • Ames, IA	ESPN	**ISU** 42–6	14,256	
December 5	11:00 a.m.	**Texas**	**Kansas State**	Bill Snyder Family Stadium • Manhattan, KS	FOX	**TEX** 69–31	9,851	
December 5	11:00 a.m.	**No. 19 Oklahoma State**	**TCU**	Amon G. Carter Stadium • Fort Worth, TX	ESPN2	**TCU** 29–22	12,594	
December 5	7:00 p.m.	**Baylor**	**No. 13 Oklahoma**	Gaylord Family Oklahoma Memorial Stadium • Norman, OK	FOX	**OKLA** 27–14	22,700	
December 5	11:00 a.m.	**Kansas**	**Texas Tech**	Jones AT&T Stadium • Lubbock, TX	FS2	**TTU** 16–13	9,877	
^{#}Rankings from AP Poll released prior to game. All times are in Central Time.

==== Week Fourteen ====
Date	Time	Visiting team	Home team	Site	TV	Result	Attendance	Ref.
December 12	2:30 p.m.	**No. 23 Texas**	**Kansas**	Memorial Stadium • Lawerence, KS	ESPNU	Canceled		
December 12	6:00 p.m.	**Oklahoma State**	**Baylor**	McLane Stadium • Baylor, TX	ESPNU	**OSU** 42–3	11,667	
December 12	6:30 p.m.	**No. 13 Oklahoma**	**West Virginia**	Milan Puskar Stadium • Morgantown, WV	ABC	Canceled		
December 12	6:00 p.m.	**TCU**	**Louisiana Tech**	Amon G. Carter Stadium • Ft. Worth, TX	FS1	**W** **TCU** 52–10	10,472	
^{#}Rankings from AP Poll released prior to game. All times are in Central Time.

=== Championship Game ===
Date	Time	Visiting team	Home team	Site	TV	Result	Attendance	Ref.
December 19	11:00 a.m.	No. 10 Oklahoma Sooners	No. 6 Iowa State Cyclones	AT&T Stadium • Arlington, Texas	ABC	**OU** 27–21	18,720	
^{#}Rankings from AP Poll released prior to game. All times are in Central Time.

== Rankings ==
		Pre	Wk 2	Wk 3	Wk 4	Wk 5	Wk 6	Wk 7	Wk 8	Wk 9	Wk 10	Wk 11	Wk 12	Wk 13	Wk 14	Wk 15	Final
Baylor	AP	RV	RV	RV	RV												
Baylor	C	RV	24	RV	RV	RV											
Baylor	CFP	Not released															
Iowa State	AP	23	RV			24	20	17	23	17	17	17	15	12			
Iowa State	C	25	RV			24	20	18	22	17	16	16	15	12			
Iowa State	CFP	Not released											13	9			
Kansas	AP																
Kansas	C																
Kansas	CFP	Not released															
Kansas State	AP				RV	RV	22	20	16	RV							
Kansas State	C	RV			RV	RV	22	19	16	RV	RV	RV					
Kansas State	CFP	Not released															
Oklahoma	AP	5	3	3	18	RV	RV	RV	24	19	18	18	14	13			
Oklahoma	C	6	3	3	16	RV	RV	RV	24	19	18	17	14	13			
Oklahoma	CFP	Not released											11	11			
Oklahoma State	AP	15	11	15	17	10	7	6	6	14	14	14	21	19			
Oklahoma State	C	16	12	18	19	10	7	6	6	12	13	14	22	18			
Oklahoma State	CFP	Not released											23	15			
TCU	AP	RV	RV	RV		RV	RV										
TCU	C	RV	RV	RV		RV	RV	RV									
TCU	CFP	Not released															
Texas	AP	14	9	8	9	22	RV		RV	22	21	22	20	RV			
Texas	C	14	8	9	9	22	RV	RV	RV	RV	24	23	21	RV			
Texas	CFP	Not released											17				
Texas Tech	AP		RV	RV													
Texas Tech	C		RV														
Texas Tech	CFP	Not released															
West Virginia	AP		RV	RV		RV	RV	RV		RV							
West Virginia	C		RV	RV		RV	RV	RV	RV	RV				RV			
West Virginia	CFP	Not released															

Legend
	Improvement in ranking
	Drop in ranking
	Not ranked previous week
	No change in ranking from previous week
RV	Received votes but were not ranked in Top 25 of poll
т	Tied with team above or below also with this symbol

== Postseason ==
=== Bowl games ===
The Big 12 Conference earned two spots in the New Years Six with both participants in the Big 12 Championship earning a spot. The Big 12 has accomplished this for the third straight year.

Legend
Big 12 win
Big 12 loss

Bowl game	Date	Site	Television	Time (CST)	Big 12 team	Opponent	Score	Attendance
Alamo Bowl	December 29	Alamodome • San Antonio, TX	ESPN	8:00 p.m.	No. 20 Texas	Colorado	**TEX** 55–23	10,822
Cheez-It Bowl	December 29	Camping World Stadium • Orlando, FL	ESPN	4:30 p.m.	No. 21 Oklahoma State	No. 18 Miami	**OSU** 37–34	
Texas Bowl	December 31	NRG Stadium • Houston, TX	ESPN	7:00 p.m.	TCU	Arkansas	Canceled	
Liberty Bowl	December 31	Liberty Bowl • Memphis, TN	ESPN	7:00 p.m.	West Virginia	Army	**WVU** 24–31	
**New Year's Six bowl game**
Cotton Bowl	December 30	AT&T Stadium • Arlington, TX	ESPN	7:00 p.m.	No. 6 Oklahoma	No. 7 Florida	**OKLA** 55–20	
Fiesta Bowl	Jan. 2, 2021	State Farm Stadium • Glendale, AZ	ESPN	3:00 p.m.	No. 10 Iowa State	No. 25 Oregon	**ISU** 34–17	

Rankings are from CFP rankings. All times Central Time Zone. Big 12 teams shown in bold.

== Records against other conferences ==
Regular Season

Power 5 Conferences	Record
ACC	0–0
Big Ten	0–0
BYU/Notre Dame	0–0
Pac-12	0–0
SEC	0–0
Power 5 Total	0–0
Other FBS Conferences	Record
The American	1–0
C–USA	2–0
Independents (Excluding BYU & Notre Dame)	0–0
MAC	0–0
Mountain West	0–0
Sun Belt	0–3
Other FBS Total	3–3
FCS Opponents	Record
Football Championship Subdivision	3–0
Total Non-Conference Record	6–3

Post Season

Power Conferences 5	Record
ACC	1–0
Big Ten	0–0
BYU/Notre Dame	0–0
Pac-12	2–0
SEC	1–0
Power 5 Total	4–0
Other FBS Conferences	Record
C–USA	0–0
Independents (Excluding BYU & Notre Dame)	1–0
MAC	0–0
Mountain West	0–0
Sun Belt	0–0
Other FBS Total	1–0
Total Bowl Record	5–0

== Big 12 vs other conferences ==
=== Big 12 vs Power 5 matchups ===
This is a list of the Power Five conferences teams (ACC, Big Ten, Pac-12, Notre Dame, BYU and SEC). Due to the COVID-19 pandemic, The Big 12 had eleven scheduled games against Power Five conferences, however, each one was canceled. All of the other Power Five conferences initially announced that they would go on with their season as scheduled, but with cuts to non-conference games, The Big Ten, Pac-12, and SEC were all limiting play to in-conference games only. The ACC and Big 12 are allowing one non-conference game. The Big Ten and Pac 12 have postponed fall sports due to COVID-19 concerns.

=== Big 12 vs Group of Five matchups ===
The following games include Big 12 teams competing against teams from The American, C-USA, MAC, Mountain West or Sun Belt. On August 8, the MAC announced the postponement of all fall sports for the 2020 season, including football. On August 10, the Mountain West followed the MAC as the second Group of Five conference to postpone fall sports indefinitely. On August 10, Rice announced it was the delaying the start of it season until September 26.

Date	Conference	Visitor	Home	Site	Score
	The American	SMU	TCU	Amon G. Carter Stadium • Fort Worth, TX	Canc.
	C-USA	Louisiana Tech	Baylor	McLane Stadium • Waco, TX	Canc.
September 12	Sun Belt	Louisiana	Iowa State	Jack Trice Stadium • Ames, IA	UL 31-14
September 12	Sun Belt	Coastal Carolina	Kansas	David Booth Kansas Memorial Stadium • Lawrence, KS	CCU 38-23
September 12	Sun Belt	Arkansas State	Kansas State	Bill Snyder Family Stadium • Manhattan, KS	ASU 35-31
September 12	C-USA	UTEP	Texas	Darrell K Royal–Texas Memorial Stadium • Austin, TX	UT 59-3
September 19	The American	Tulsa	Oklahoma State	Boone Pickens Stadium • Stillwater, OK	OSU 16-7
September 19	The American	Houston	Baylor	McLane Stadium • Waco, TX	Canc.
December 12	C-USA	Louisiana Tech	TCU	Amon G. Carter Stadium • Fort Worth, TX	TCU 52-10

=== Big 12 vs FBS independents matchups ===
The following games include Big 12 teams competing against FBS Independents which include Army, Liberty, New Mexico State, UConn and UMass. UConn, announced that they would opt out of the 2020 season. UMass announced that they would opt of playing fall football and hopes to construct a season in spring 2021. New Mexico State announced that they would opt out of playing fall football and try to play in spring 2021.

=== Big 12 vs FCS matchups ===
The Football Championship Subdivision comprises 13 conferences and two independent programs. All conferences and teams have postponed their fall conference schedules, The Big South, (James Madison, Elon, Villanova from the CAA), Missouri Valley Football Conference, Ohio Valley Conference, SoCon, and Southland Conference are allowing the option of playing out-of-conference games only

Date	Visitor	Home	Site	Score
September 12	Missouri State	Oklahoma	Gaylord Family Oklahoma Memorial Stadium • Norman, OK	48-0
September 12	Houston Baptist	Texas Tech	Jones AT&T Stadium • Lubbock, TX	35-33
September 12	Eastern Kentucky	West Virginia	Milan Puskar Stadium • Morgantown, WV	56-10

== Awards and honors ==
=== Player of the week honors ===
Offensive Player of the Week S13 Sam Ehlinger, UT, QB, Sr. S20 Tylan Wallace, OSU, WR, Sr. S27 Skylar Thompson, K-State, QB, Sr. Sam Ehlinger, UT, QB, Sr. O5 Breece Hall, ISU, RB, So. O12 T.J. Pledger, OU, RB, Jr. O19 Leddie Brown, WVU, RB, Jr. O26 Breece Hall, ISU, RB, So. Marvin Mims, OU, WR, Fr. N2 Rhamondre Stevenson, OU, RB, Sr. Tylan Wallace, OSU, WR, Sr. N9 Breece Hall, RB, ISU, So. N16 T.J. Simmons, WVU, WR, Sr. N23 Spencer Rattler, OU, QB, R-Fr. N30 Charlie Brewer, BU, QB, Sr. D7 Brock Purdy, ISU, QB, Jr. D14 Dillon Stoner, OSU, WR, Sr.

Defensive Player of the Week S13 Krishon Merriweather, TTU, LB, Jr. S20 Malcolm Rodriguez, OSU, LB, Sr. S27 JaQuan Bailey, ISU, DE, R-Sr. Jahron McPherson, K-State, DB, Sr. O5 La’Kendrick Van Zandt, TCU, S, Jr. Darius Stills, WVU, DL, Sr. O12 AJ Parker, K-State, DB, Sr. O19 Josh Chandler-Semedo, WVU, LB, Jr. O26 Terrel Bernard, BU, LB, Jr. N2 Joseph Ossai, UT, LB, Jr. N9 Mike Rose, ISU, LB, Jr. N16 Tykee Smith, WVU, SPEAR, So. N23 Ronnie Perkins, OU, DE, Jr. N30 Latrell Bankston, ISU, DL, Jr. D7 Amen Ogbongbemiga, OSU, LB, R-Sr. D14 C.J. Caesar II, TCU, CB, So.

== Home game attendance ==
Team	Stadium	Capacity	Game 1	Game 2	Game 3	Game 4	Game 5	Game 6	Game 7	Total	Average	% of capacity
Baylor	McLane Stadium	45,140	11,667	11,667	11,667							
Iowa State	Jack Trice Stadium	61,500	0	13,724	13,502	13,535	0					
Kansas	David Booth Kansas Memorial Stadium	50,071	0	9,480	9,652	0						
Kansas State	Bill Snyder Family Stadium	53,000	11,041	10,932	10,081	11,980						
Oklahoma	Gaylord Family Oklahoma Memorial Stadium	86,112	22,700	22,700	22,700	22,700	22,700			113,500	22,700	
Oklahoma State	Boone Pickens Stadium	55,509	14,668	14,672	14,671	14,672	14,645					
TCU	Amon G. Carter Stadium	45,000	11,852	12,208	12,440	12,356						
Texas	Darrell K Royal–Texas Memorial Stadium	95,594	15,337	17,753	18,202	17,843	16,555					
Texas Tech	Jones AT&T Stadium	60,454	11,157	16,615	13,532	14,431	12,914					
West Virginia	Milan Puskar Stadium	60,000	976	978	10,759	10,441	11,111					

Bold – exceeded capacity
† Season high
‡ Record stadium Attendance

== NFL draft ==
The following list includes all Big 12 players who were drafted in the 2021 NFL draft.

Player	Position	School	Draft Round	Round Pick	Overall Pick	Team
Teven Jenkins	OT	Oklahoma State	2	7	39	Chicago Bears
Trevon Moehrig	S	TCU	2	11	43	Las Vegas Raiders
Sam Cosmi	OT	Texas	2	19	51	Washington Football Team
Creed Humphrey	C	Oklahoma	2	31	63	Kansas City Chiefs
Joseph Ossai	DE	Texas	3	5	69	Cincinnati Bengals
Ronnie Perkins	DE	Oklahoma	3	32	96	New England Patriots
Kene Nwangwu	RB	Iowa State	4	14	119	Minnesota Vikings
Rhamondre Stevenson	RB	Oklahoma	4	15	120	New England Patriots
Zech McPhearson	CB	Texas Tech	4	18	123	Philadelphia Eagles
Chuba Hubbard	RB	Oklahoma State	4	21	126	Carolina Panthers
Tylan Wallace	WR	Oklahoma State	4	26	131	Baltimore Ravens
Tre Brown	CB	Oklahoma	4	32	137	Seattle Seahawks
Ta'Quon Graham	DE	Texas	5	4	148	Atlanta Falcons
Caden Sterns	S	Texas	5	8	152	Denver Broncos
Tony Fields II	ILB	West Virginia	5	9	153	Cleveland Browns
Garret Wallow	ILB	TCU	5	26	170	Houston Texans
Rodarius Williams	CB	Oklahoma State	6	17	201	New York Giants
Sam Ehlinger	QB	Texas	6	34	218	Indianapolis Colts
Wyatt Hubert	DE	Kansas State	7	7	235	Cincinnati Bengals
Jack Anderson	OG	Texas Tech	7	8	236	Buffalo Bills
William Bradley-King	DE	Baylor	7	12	240	Washington Football Team
Tre Norwood	CB	Oklahoma	7	17	245	Pittsburgh Steelers
