= 2021 NFL draft =

86th annual meeting of NFL franchises to select newly eligible players

General information
- Date: April 29 – May 1, 2021
- Location: FirstEnergy Stadium; Cleveland, Ohio
- Networks: ESPN, ABC, NFL Network, ESPN Deportes, ESPN Radio

Overview
- 259 total selections in 7 rounds
- League: National Football League
- First selection: Trevor Lawrence, QB, Jacksonville Jaguars
- Mr. Irrelevant: Grant Stuard, LB, Tampa Bay Buccaneers
- Most selections (11): Carolina Panthers; Dallas Cowboys; Minnesota Vikings
- Fewest selections (3): Seattle Seahawks

The 2021 NFL draft was the 86th National Football League draft, the annual meeting of National Football League (NFL) franchises to select newly eligible players for the 2021 NFL season. The draft was held in Cleveland, Ohio from April 29 to May 1, 2021.

Five quarterbacks were selected in the first round—Trevor Lawrence, Zach Wilson, Trey Lance, Justin Fields, and Mac Jones—the second highest amount (along with the 1999 and 2018 drafts) after the six selected in 1983 and 2024. The draft also marked the third time the first three picks were quarterbacks, following the 1971 and 1999 drafts. A total of eight quarterbacks were selected in the first three rounds, the most in NFL draft history, although only two quarterbacks were taken in the remaining rounds. By 2024, Lawrence was the only first-round quarterback to remain with his original team.

In addition to the high number of quarterbacks, six Alabama players were taken in the first round, which is tied with the six Miami players picked in 2004 for the most from an individual school. Conversely, no Big 12 Conference players were drafted in the first round for the first time since the conference began play in 1996 and no Michigan State players were selected for the first time since 1941.

Scouts considered the later rounds of the draft to lack desirable prospects due to the COVID-19 pandemic shortening the 2020 college football season. The NCAA granted an extra year of eligibility and an opt-out option for athletes because of the shortened season, resulting in many prospects returning to school instead of declaring for the draft.

This was the first time that Dawn Aponte started to announce picks while Roger Goodell and Troy Vincent returned after a 1 year absence, with the 85th pick.

== Host city bid process ==
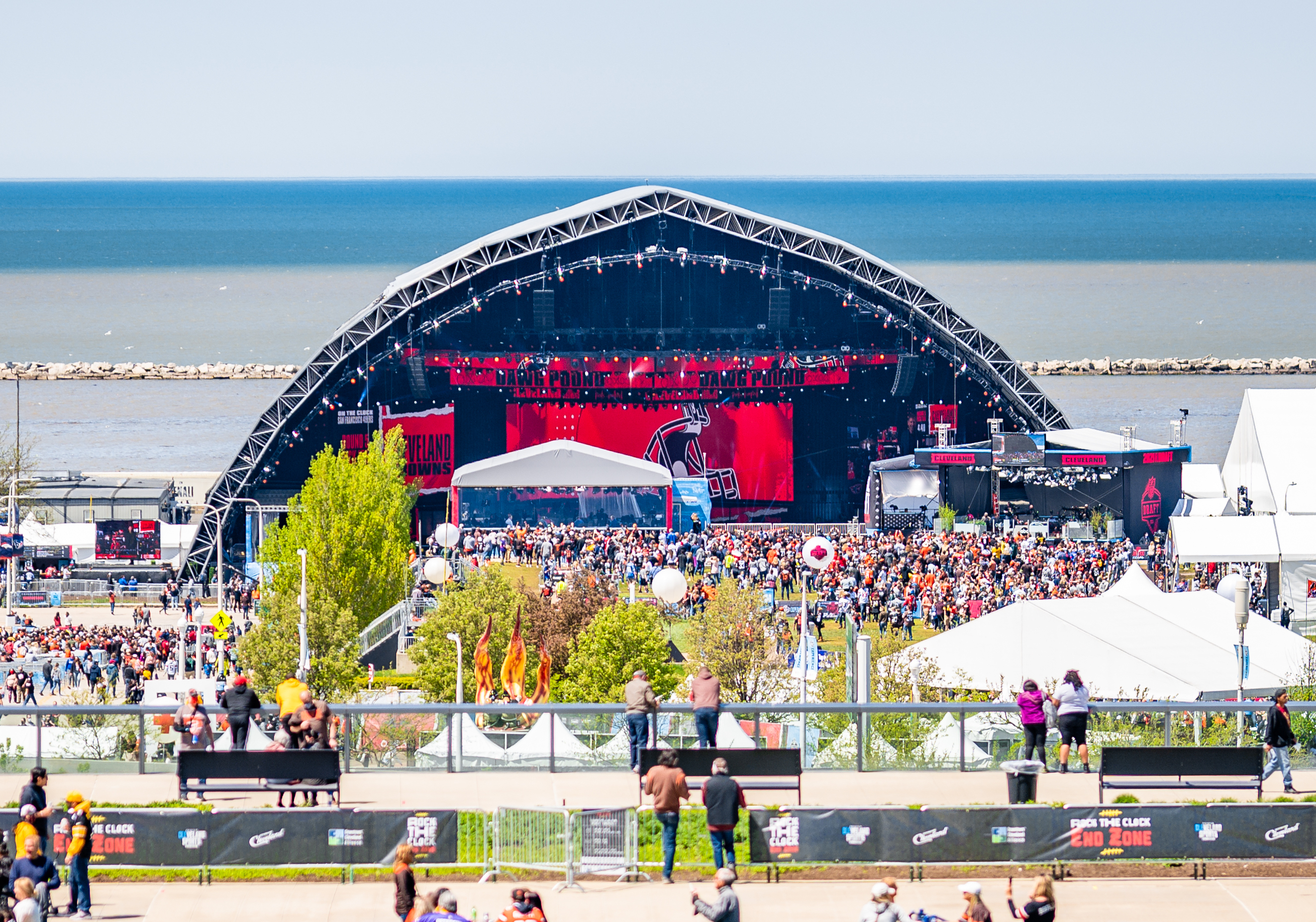
View of the temporary stage used for the draft

The host city was chosen during the NFL Spring League Meeting on May 22, 2019. Cleveland and Kansas City were announced as the hosts for 2021 and 2023, respectively, from the remaining finalists from the 2019 draft after Las Vegas was chosen to host the 2022 event.

== Player selections ==
The following is the breakdown of the 259 players selected by position:

- 38 cornerbacks
- 36 wide receivers
- 33 defensive ends
- 25 offensive tackles
- 22 linebackers
- 21 safeties
- 19 defensive tackles
- 18 running backs
- 13 guards
- 11 tight ends
- 10 quarterbacks
- 8 centers
- 2 long snappers
- 1 fullback
- 1 kicker
- 1 punter

*	compensatory selection
×	Resolution JC-2A selection
†	Pro Bowler (Note: Players are identified as Pro Bowlers if they were selected for the Pro Bowl at any time in their career.)

Positions key
Offense	Defense	Special teams
QB — Quarterback; RB — Running back; FB — Fullback; WR — Wide receiver; TE — Tight end; OL — Offensive lineman; T — Tackle; G — Guard; C — Center	DL — Defensive lineman; DT — Defensive tackle (Note: Includes nose tackle (NT)); DE — Defensive end; EDGE — Edge rusher; LB — Linebacker (Note: Includes middle linebacker (MLB/MIKE), weakside linebacker (WILL), strongside linebacker (SAM), off-ball linebacker, and outside linebacker (OLB)); DB — Defensive back; CB — Cornerback; S — Safety (Note: Includes free safety (FS) and strong safety (SS))	K — Kicker (Note: Also known as a placekicker (PK)); P — Punter; LS — Long snapper; RS — Return specialist (Note: Includes kickoff and punt returners)

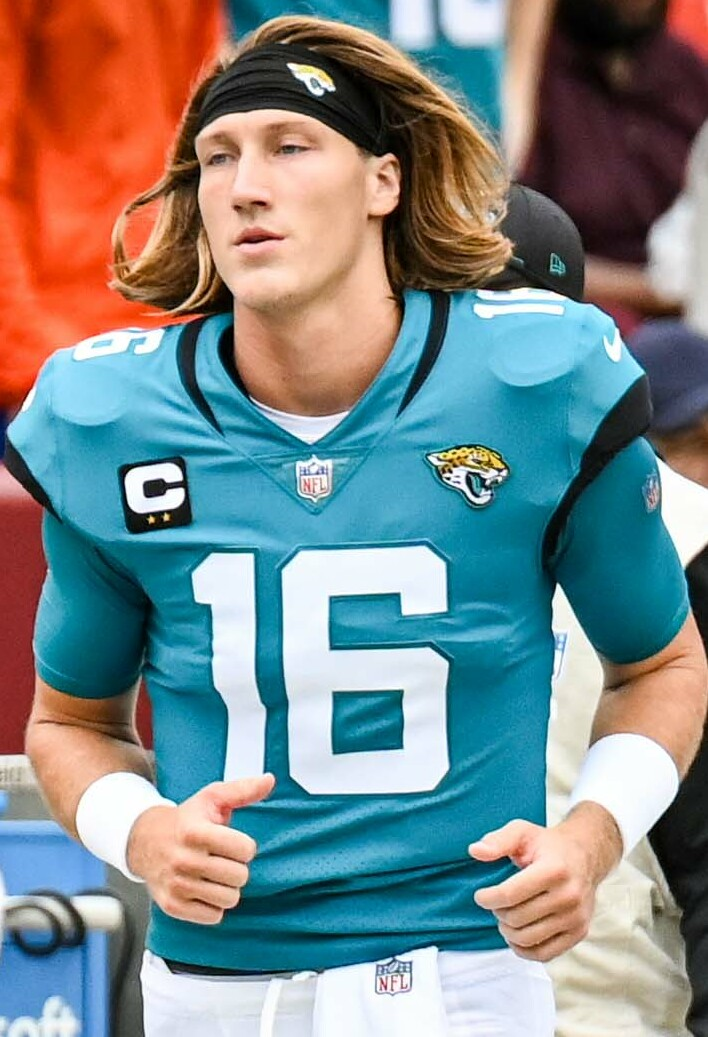
Quarterback Trevor Lawrence led the Jacksonville Jaguars to their first division title and playoff win in four years

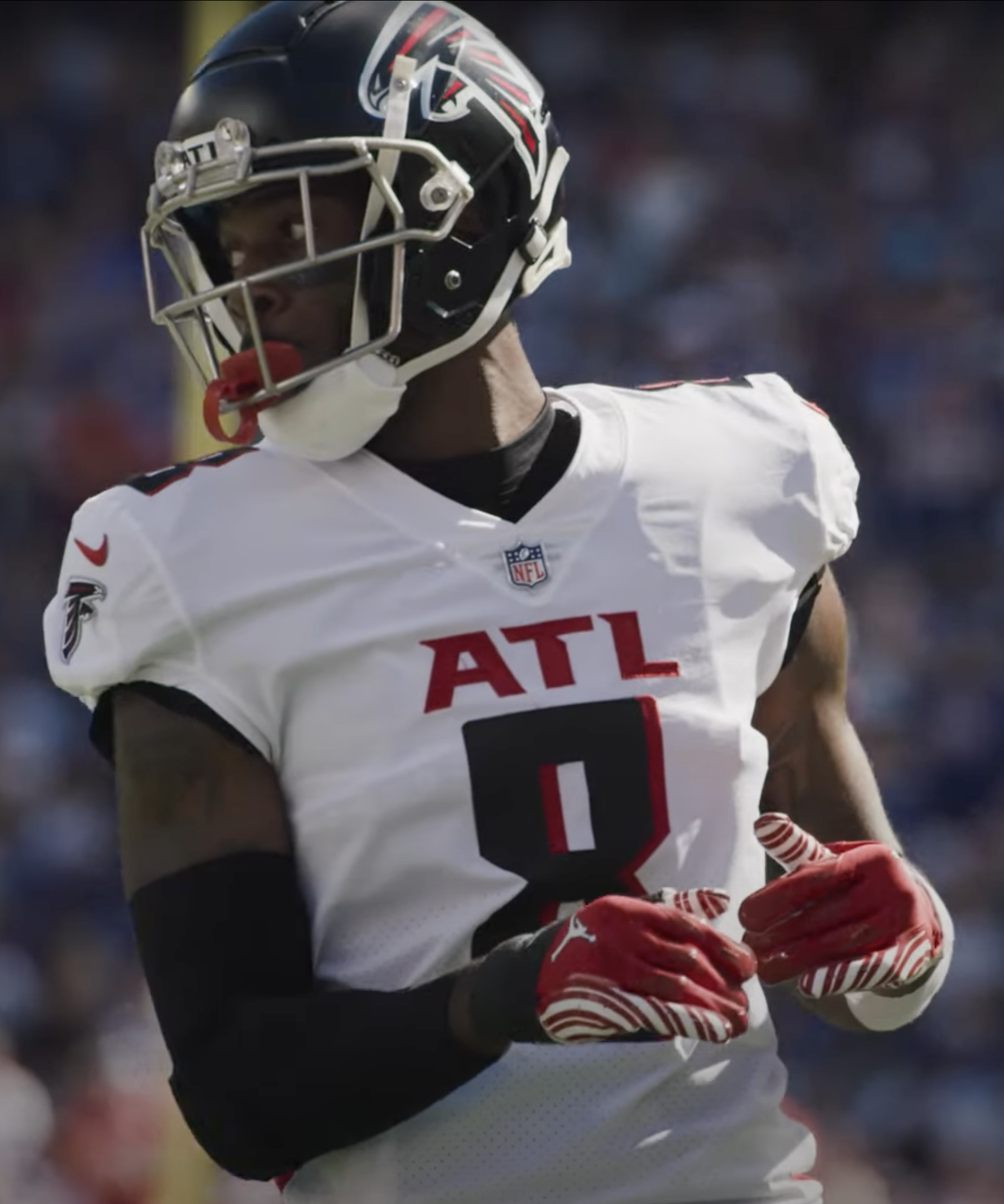
Kyle Pitts is the NFL's highest drafted tight end at fourth overall

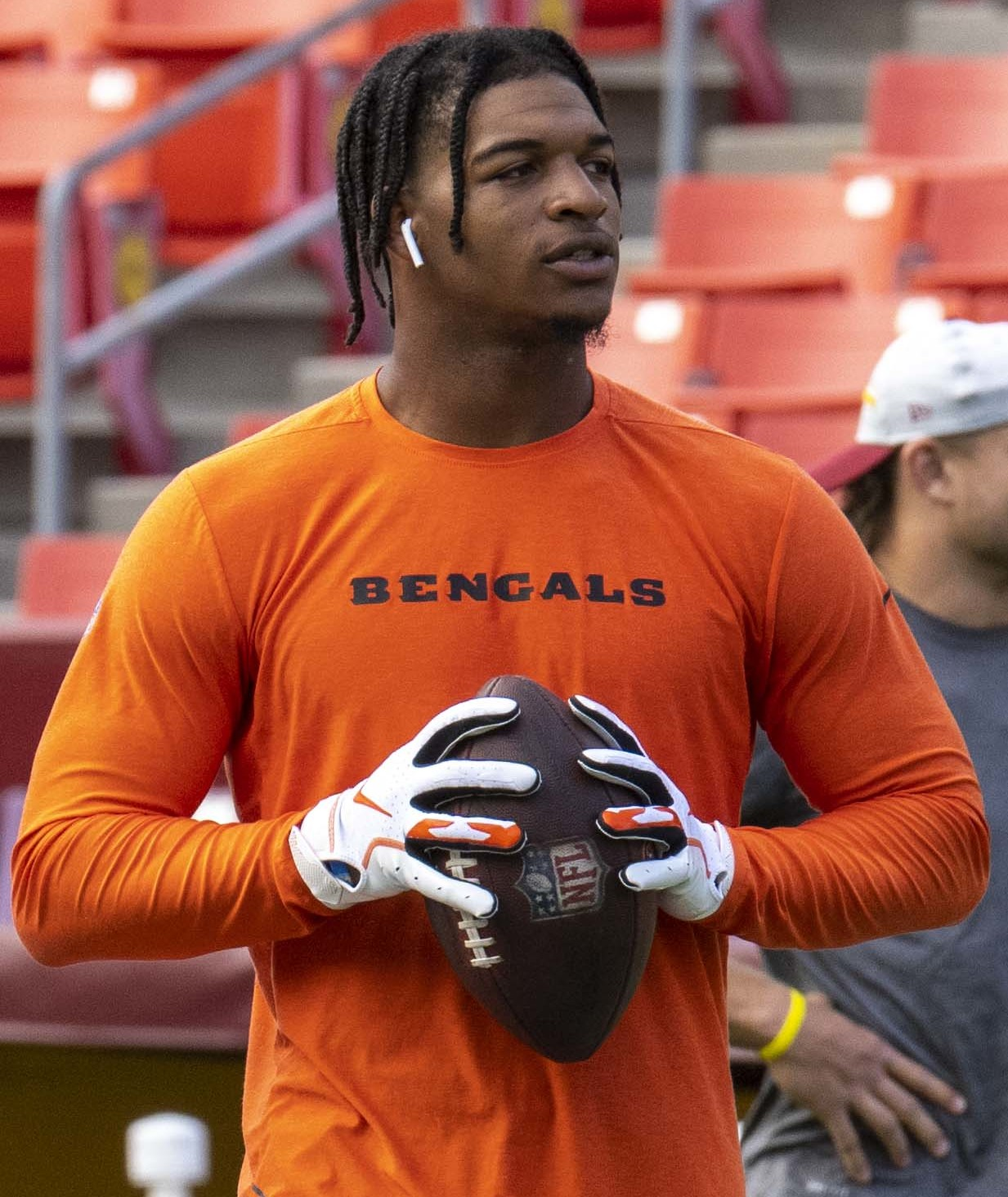
Wide receiver Ja'Marr Chase set the single-year record for rookie receiving yards and won Offensive Rookie of the Year

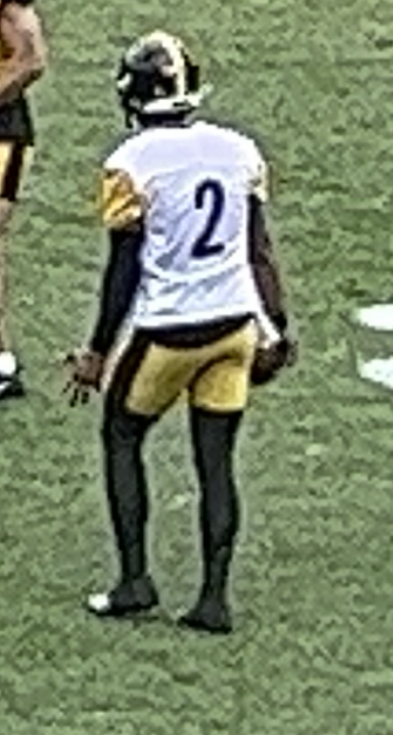
Justin Fields holds the NFL single-game record for rushing yards by a quarterback

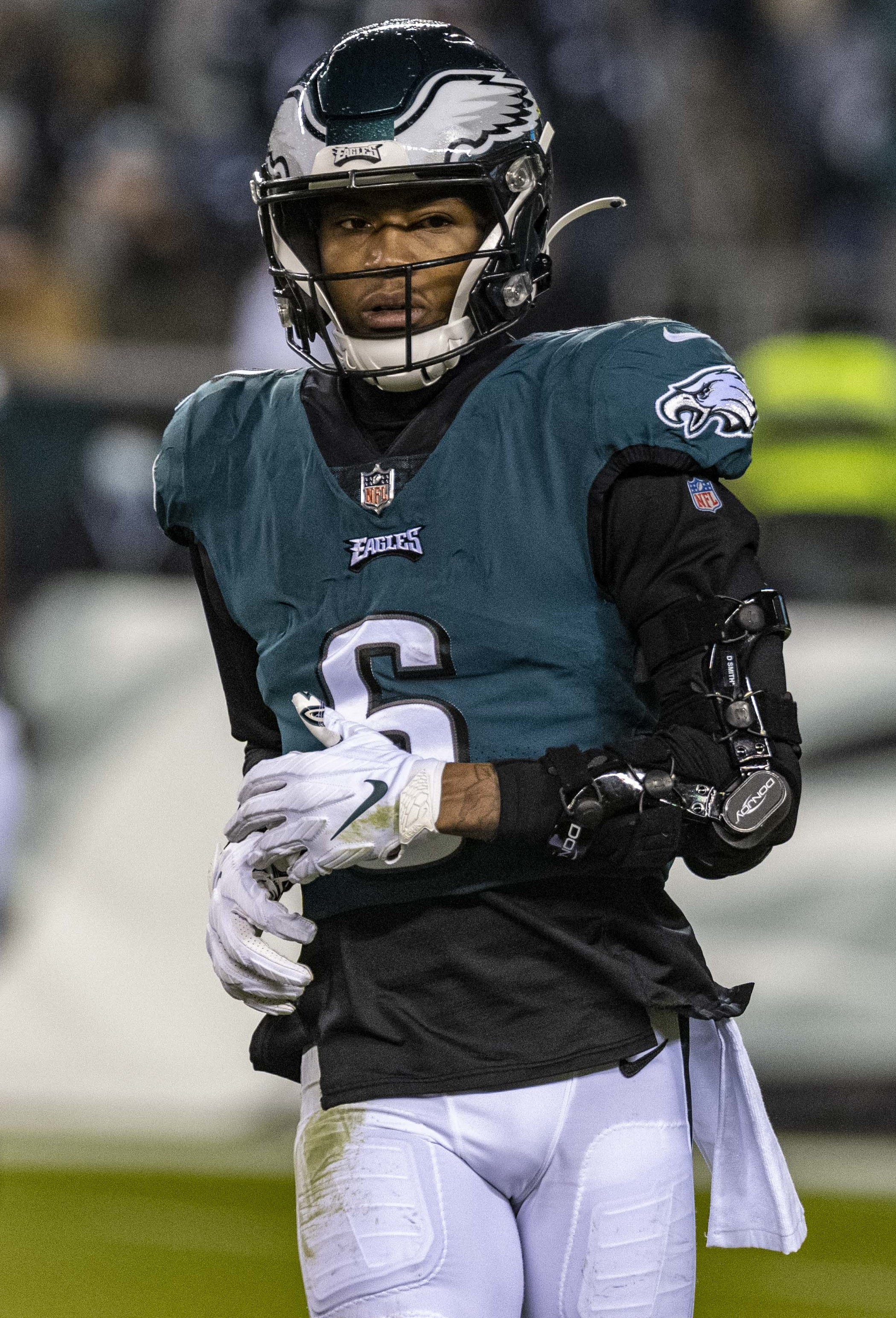
Wide receiver DeVonta Smith set the Philadelphia Eagles rookie receiving yards record

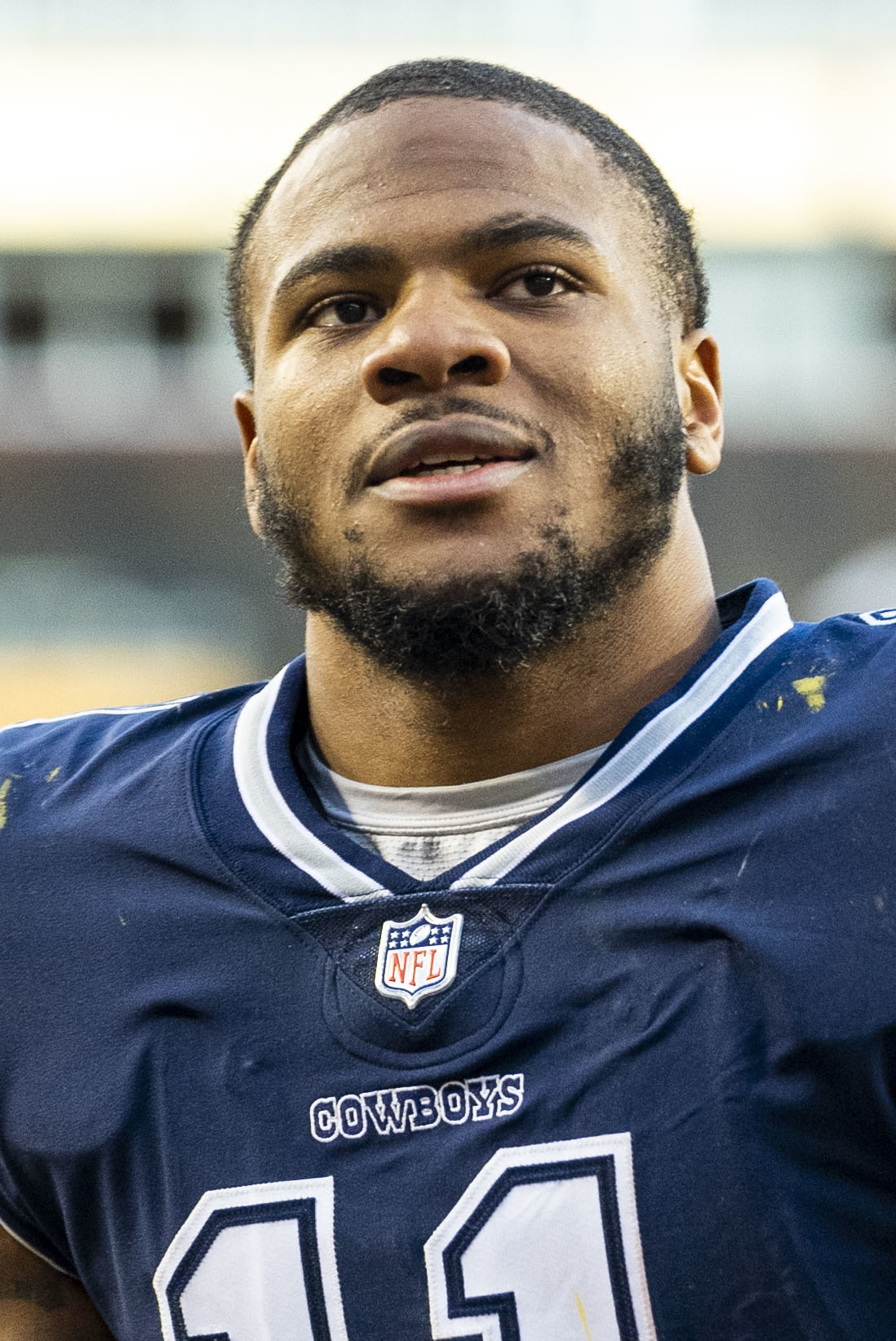
Linebacker Micah Parsons was the first unanimous Defensive Rookie of the Year

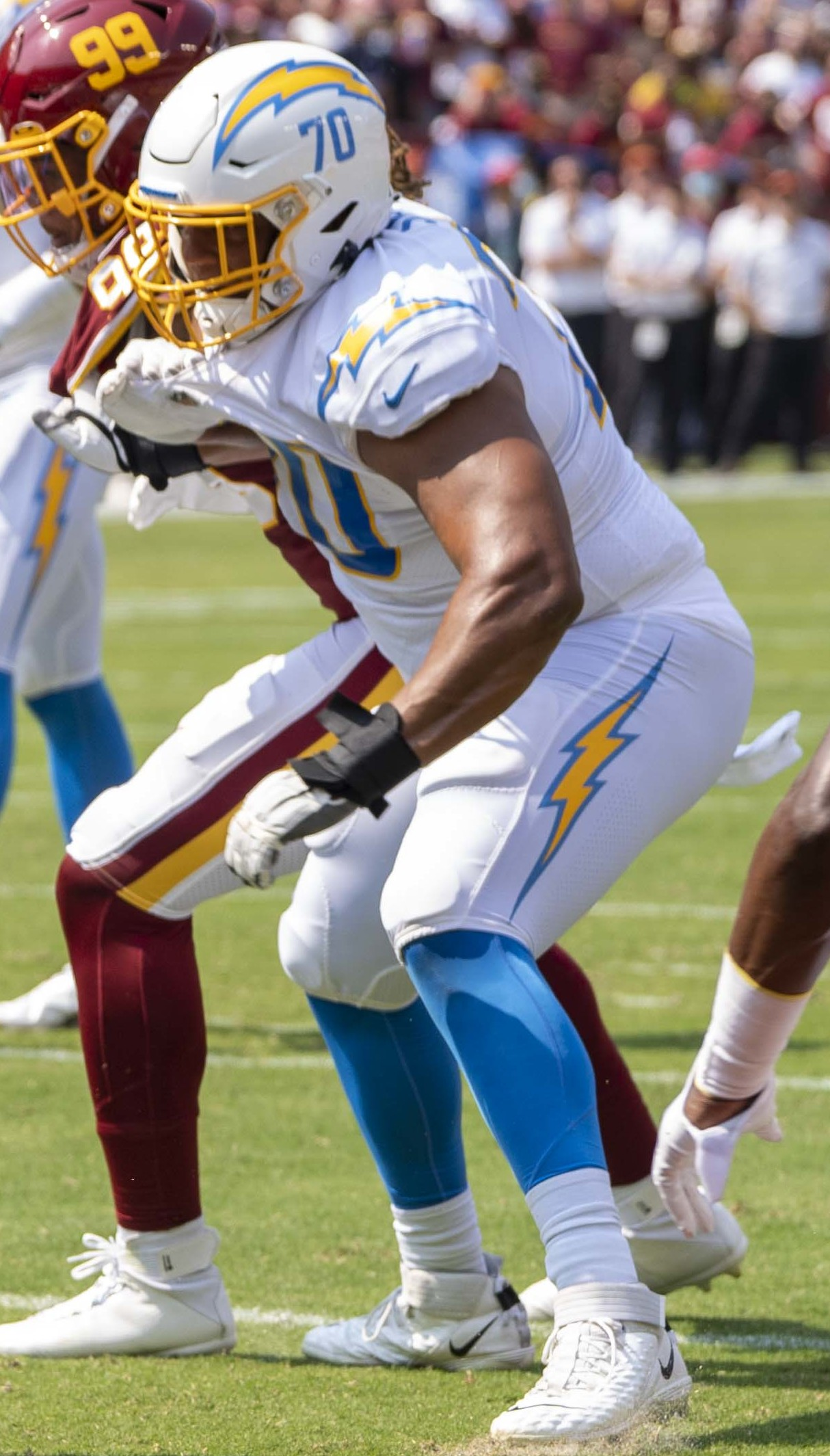
Offensive tackle Rashawn Slater earned Pro Bowl and All-Pro honors as a rookie

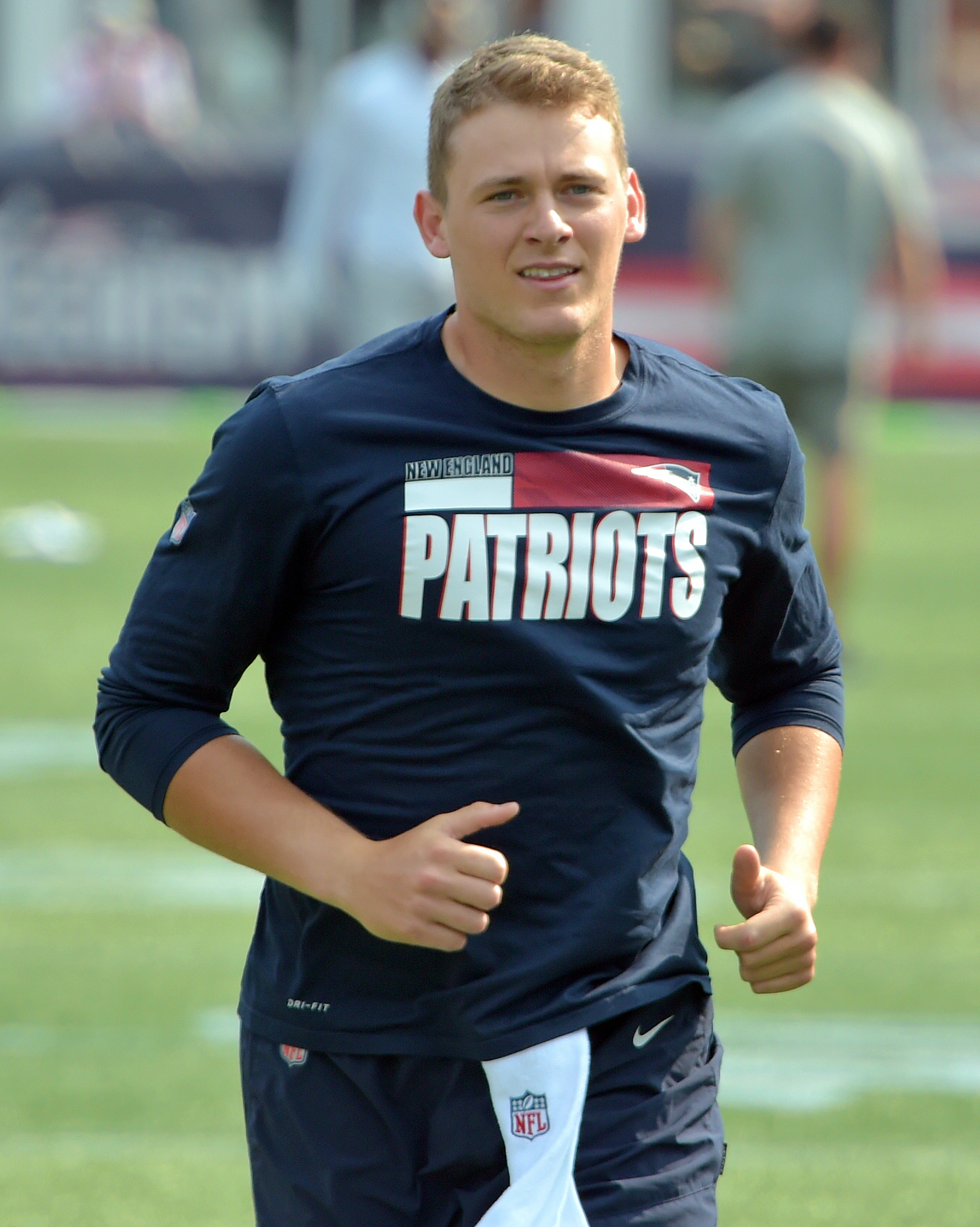
Quarterback Mac Jones earned Pro Bowl honors as a rookie and was named to the PFWA All-Rookie Team

Rnd.	Pick	Team	Player	Pos.	College	Notes
1	1	Jacksonville Jaguars	Trevor Lawrence ^{†}	QB	Clemson	
1	2	New York Jets	Zach Wilson	QB	BYU	
1	3	San Francisco 49ers	Trey Lance	QB	North Dakota State	from Houston via Miami (Note: No. 3: Houston → Miami → San Francisco. Multiple trades: Houston → Miami (PD). Houston traded first- and second-round selections (3rd and 36th overall), a 2020 first-round selection, OT Julién Davenport and CB Johnson Bademosi to Miami in exchange for a sixth-round selection (202nd overall), a 2020 fourth-round selection, WR Kenny Stills and OT Laremy Tunsil. Miami → San Francisco (PD). Miami traded a first-round selection (3rd overall) to San Francisco in exchange for a first-round selection (12th overall), 2022 first- and third-round selections, and a 2023 first-round selection.)
1	4	Atlanta Falcons	Kyle Pitts ^{†}	TE	Florida	2020 John Mackey Award winner
1	5	Cincinnati Bengals	Ja'Marr Chase ^{†}	WR	LSU	2019 Biletnikoff Award winner
1	6	Miami Dolphins	Jaylen Waddle	WR	Alabama	from Philadelphia (Note: No. 6: Philadelphia → Miami (PD). Philadelphia traded first- and fifth-round selections (6th and 156th overall) to Miami in exchange for first- and fourth-round selections (12th and 123rd overall), and a 2022 first-round selection.)
1	7	Detroit Lions	Penei Sewell ^{†}	T	Oregon	2019 Outland Trophy winner
1	8	Carolina Panthers	Jaycee Horn ^{†}	CB	South Carolina	
1	9	Denver Broncos	Patrick Surtain II ^{†}	CB	Alabama	
1	10	Philadelphia Eagles	DeVonta Smith	WR	Alabama	from Dallas (Note: No. 10: Dallas → Philadelphia (D). Dallas traded a first-round selection (10th overall) to Philadelphia in exchange for first- and third-round selections (12th and 84th overall).); 2020 Heisman Trophy, Maxwell Award, Biletnikoff Award and Walter Camp Award winner
1	11	Chicago Bears	Justin Fields	QB	Ohio State	from NY Giants (Note: No. 11: NY Giants → Chicago (D). The NY Giants traded a first-round selection (11th overall) to Chicago in exchange for first- and fifth-round selections (20th and 164th overall), and 2022 first- and fourth-round selections.)
1	12	Dallas Cowboys	Micah Parsons ^{†}	LB	Penn State	from San Francisco via Miami and Philadelphia (Note: No. 12: San Francisco → Miami → Dallas. Multiple trades: San Francisco → Miami (PD). See Round 1: Miami → San Francisco. Miami → Philadelphia (PD). See Round 1: Philadelphia → Miami. Philadelphia → Dallas (D). See Round 1: Dallas → Philadelphia.)
1	13	Los Angeles Chargers	Rashawn Slater ^{†}	T	Northwestern	
1	14	New York Jets	Alijah Vera-Tucker	G	USC	from Minnesota (Note: No. 14: Minnesota → NY Jets (D). Minnesota traded first- and fourth-round selections (14th and 143rd overall) to the NY Jets in exchange for a first-round selection and two third-round selections (23rd, 66th and 86th overall).)
1	15	New England Patriots	Mac Jones ^{†}	QB	Alabama	2020 Davey O'Brien Award winner and Johnny Unitas Golden Arm Award winner
1	16	Arizona Cardinals	Zaven Collins	LB	Tulsa	2020 Bronko Nagurski Trophy winner and Chuck Bednarik Award winner
1	17	Las Vegas Raiders	Alex Leatherwood	T	Alabama	2020 Outland Trophy winner
1	18	Miami Dolphins	Jaelan Phillips	DE	Miami (FL)	
1	19	Washington Football Team	Jamin Davis	LB	Kentucky	
1	20	New York Giants	Kadarius Toney	WR	Florida	from Chicago (Note: No. 20: Chicago → NY Giants (D). See Round 1: NY Giants → Chicago.)
1	21	Indianapolis Colts	Kwity Paye	DE	Michigan	
1	22	Tennessee Titans	Caleb Farley	CB	Virginia Tech	
1	23	Minnesota Vikings	Christian Darrisaw	T	Virginia Tech	from Seattle via NY Jets (Note: No. 23: Seattle → NY Jets → Minnesota. Multiple trades: Seattle → NY Jets (PD). Seattle traded first- and third-round selections (23rd and 86th overall), a 2022 first-round selection and S Bradley McDougald to the NY Jets in exchange for a 2022 fourth-round selection and S Jamal Adams. NY Jets → Minnesota (D). See Round 1: Minnesota → NY Jets.)
1	24	Pittsburgh Steelers	Najee Harris ^{†}	RB	Alabama	2020 Doak Walker Award winner
1	25	Jacksonville Jaguars	Travis Etienne	RB	Clemson	from LA Rams (Note: No. 25: LA Rams → Jacksonville (PD). The LA Rams traded first- and fourth-round selections (25th and 130th overall), and a 2020 first-round selection to Jacksonville in exchange for CB Jalen Ramsey.)
1	26	Cleveland Browns	Greg Newsome II	CB	Northwestern	
1	27	Baltimore Ravens	Rashod Bateman	WR	Minnesota	
1	28	New Orleans Saints	Payton Turner	DE	Houston	
1	29	Green Bay Packers	Eric Stokes	CB	Georgia	
1	30	Buffalo Bills	Gregory Rousseau	DE	Miami (FL)	
1	31	Baltimore Ravens	Odafe Oweh	DE	Penn State	from Kansas City (Note: No. 31: Kansas City → Baltimore (PD). Kansas City traded first-, third- and fourth-round selections (31st, 94th and 136th overall) and a 2022 fifth-round selection to Baltimore in exchange for a second-round selection (58th overall), a 2022 sixth-round selection and OT Orlando Brown Jr.)
1	32	Tampa Bay Buccaneers	Joe Tryon-Shoyinka	DE	Washington	
2	33	Jacksonville Jaguars	Tyson Campbell	CB	Georgia	
2	34	New York Jets	Elijah Moore	WR	Ole Miss	
2	35	Denver Broncos	Javonte Williams	RB	North Carolina	from Atlanta (Note: No. 35: Atlanta → Denver (D). Atlanta traded second- and sixth-round selections (35th and 219th overall) to Denver in exchange for second- and fourth-round selections (40th and 114th overall).)
2	36	Miami Dolphins	Jevon Holland	S	Oregon	from Houston (Note: No. 36: Houston → Miami (PD). See Round 1: Houston → Miami.)
2	37	Philadelphia Eagles	Landon Dickerson ^{†}	C	Alabama	2020 Rimington Trophy winner
2	38	New England Patriots	Christian Barmore	DT	Alabama	from Cincinnati (Note: No. 38: Cincinnati → New England (D). Cincinnati traded a second-round selection (38th overall) to New England in exchange for a second-round selection and two fourth-round selections (46th, 122nd and 139th overall).)
2	39	Chicago Bears	Teven Jenkins	T	Oklahoma State	from Carolina (Note: No. 39: Carolina → Chicago (D). Carolina traded a second- and fifth-round selection (39th and 151st overall) to Chicago in exchange for second-, third- and sixth-round selections (52nd, 83rd and 204th overall).)
2	40	Atlanta Falcons	Richie Grant	S	UCF	from Denver (Note: No. 40: Denver → Atlanta (D). See Round 2: Atlanta → Denver.)
2	41	Detroit Lions	Levi Onwuzurike	DT	Washington	
2	42	Miami Dolphins	Liam Eichenberg	T	Notre Dame	from NY Giants (Note: No. 42: NY Giants → Miami (D). The NY Giants traded a second-round selection (42nd overall) to Miami in exchange for a second-round selection (50th overall) and a 2022 third-round selection.)
2	43	Las Vegas Raiders	Trevon Moehrig	S	TCU	from San Francisco (Note: No. 43: San Francisco → Las Vegas (D). San Francisco traded second- and seventh-round selections (43rd and 230th overall) to Las Vegas in exchange for second- and fourth-round selections (48th and 121st overall).); 2020 Jim Thorpe Award winner
2	44	Dallas Cowboys	Kelvin Joseph	CB	Kentucky	
2	45	Jacksonville Jaguars	Walker Little	T	Stanford	from Minnesota (Note: No. 45: Minnesota → Jacksonville (PD). Minnesota traded a second-round selection and a previously-conditional 2022 fifth-round selection to Jacksonville in exchange for DE Yannick Ngakoue. The fifth-round selection would have upgraded to either the fourth round if Ngakoue was selected to the Pro Bowl at the end of the 2020 season or the third round if Minnesota had won the Super Bowl, but neither of these conditions was met.)
2	46	Cincinnati Bengals	Jackson Carman	T	Clemson	from New England (Note: No. 46: New England → Cincinnati (D). See Round 2: Cincinnati → New England.)
2	47	Los Angeles Chargers	Asante Samuel Jr.	CB	Florida State	
2	48	San Francisco 49ers	Aaron Banks	G	Notre Dame	from Las Vegas (Note: No. 48: Las Vegas → San Francisco (D). See Round 2: San Francisco → Las Vegas.)
2	49	Arizona Cardinals	Rondale Moore	WR	Purdue	
2	50	New York Giants	Azeez Ojulari	DE	Georgia	from Miami (Note: No. 50: Miami → NY Giants (D). See Round 2: NY Giants → Miami.)
2	51	Washington Football Team	Sam Cosmi	T	Texas	
2	52	Cleveland Browns	Jeremiah Owusu-Koramoah ^{†}	LB	Notre Dame	from Chicago via Carolina (Note: No. 52: Chicago → Carolina → Cleveland. Multiple trades: Chicago → Carolina (D). See Round 2: Carolina → Chicago. Carolina → Cleveland (D). Carolina traded second- and fourth-round selections (52nd and 113th overall) to Cleveland in exchange for second- and third-round selections (59th and 89th overall).); 2020 Butkus Award winner
2	53	Tennessee Titans	Dillon Radunz	T	North Dakota State	
2	54	Indianapolis Colts	Dayo Odeyingbo	DE	Vanderbilt	
2	55	Pittsburgh Steelers	Pat Freiermuth	TE	Penn State	
2	56	Seattle Seahawks	D'Wayne Eskridge	WR	Western Michigan	
2	57	Los Angeles Rams	Tutu Atwell	WR	Louisville	
2	58	Kansas City Chiefs	Nick Bolton	LB	Missouri	from Baltimore (Note: No. 58: Baltimore → Kansas City (PD). See Round 1: Kansas City → Baltimore.)
2	59	Carolina Panthers	Terrace Marshall Jr.	WR	LSU	from Cleveland (Note: No. 59: Cleveland → Carolina (D). See Round 2: Carolina → Cleveland.)
2	60	New Orleans Saints	Pete Werner	LB	Ohio State	
2	61	Buffalo Bills	Boogie Basham	DE	Wake Forest	
2	62	Green Bay Packers	Josh Myers	C	Ohio State	
2	63	Kansas City Chiefs	Creed Humphrey ^{†}	C	Oklahoma	
2	64	Tampa Bay Buccaneers	Kyle Trask	QB	Florida	
3	65	Jacksonville Jaguars	Andre Cisco	S	Syracuse	
3	66	Minnesota Vikings	Kellen Mond	QB	Texas A&M	from NY Jets (Note: No. 66: NY Jets → Minnesota (D). See Round 1: Minnesota → NY Jets.)
3	67	Houston Texans	Davis Mills	QB	Stanford	
3	68	Atlanta Falcons	Jalen Mayfield	T	Michigan	
3	69	Cincinnati Bengals	Joseph Ossai	DE	Texas	
3	70	Carolina Panthers	Brady Christensen	T	BYU	from Philadelphia (Note: No. 70: Philadelphia → Carolina (D). Philadelphia traded a third-round selection (70th overall) to Carolina in exchange for third- and sixth-round selections (73rd and 191st overall).)
3	71	New York Giants	Aaron Robinson	CB	UCF	from Denver (Note: No. 71: Denver → NY Giants (D). Denver traded a third-round selection (71st overall) to the NY Giants in exchange for third- and fifth-round selections (76th and 164th overall).)
3	72	Detroit Lions	Alim McNeill	DT	NC State	
3	73	Philadelphia Eagles	Milton Williams	DT	Louisiana Tech	from Carolina (Note: No. 73: Carolina → Philadelphia (D). See Round 3: Philadelphia → Carolina.)
3	74	Washington Football Team	Benjamin St-Juste	CB	Minnesota	from San Francisco (Note: No. 74: San Francisco → Washington (PD). San Francisco traded third-round and 2020 fifth-round selections to Washington in exchange for OT Trent Williams.)
3	75	Dallas Cowboys	Osa Odighizuwa	DT	UCLA	
3	76	New Orleans Saints	Paulson Adebo	CB	Stanford	from NY Giants via Denver (Note: No. 76: NY Giants → Denver → New Orleans. Multiple trades: NY Giants → Denver (D). See Round 3: Denver → NY Giants. Denver → New Orleans (D). Denver traded a third-round selection (76th overall) to New Orleans in exchange for two third-round selections (98th and 105th overall).)
3	–	New England Patriots	Selection forfeited (Note: New England forfeited a third-round selection as punishment for illegal filming of the field and sidelines by the team's television crew of a 2019 game between Cincinnati and Cleveland.)			
3	77	Los Angeles Chargers	Josh Palmer	WR	Tennessee	
3	78	Minnesota Vikings	Chazz Surratt	LB	North Carolina	
3	79	Las Vegas Raiders	Malcolm Koonce	DE	Buffalo	from Arizona (Note: No. 79: Arizona → Las Vegas (PD). Arizona traded a third-round selection (79th overall) to Las Vegas in exchange for a seventh-round selection (247th overall) and C Rodney Hudson.)
3	80	Las Vegas Raiders	Divine Deablo	LB	Virginia Tech	
3	81	Miami Dolphins	Hunter Long	TE	Boston College	
3	82	Washington Football Team	Dyami Brown	WR	North Carolina	
3	83	Carolina Panthers	Tommy Tremble	TE	Notre Dame	from Chicago (Note: No. 83: Chicago → Carolina (D). See Round 2: Carolina → Chicago.)
3	84	Dallas Cowboys	Chauncey Golston	DE	Iowa	from Indianapolis via Philadelphia (Note: No. 84: Indianapolis → Philadelphia → Dallas. Multiple trades: Indianapolis → Philadelphia (PD). Indianapolis traded a third-round selection and a 2022 first-round selection, to Philadelphia in exchange for QB Carson Wentz. Philadelphia → Dallas (D). See Round 1: Dallas → Philadelphia.)
3	85	Green Bay Packers	Amari Rodgers	WR	Clemson	from Tennessee (Note: No. 85: Tennessee → Green Bay (D). Tennessee traded a third-round selection (85th overall) to Green Bay in exchange for third- and fourth-round selections (92nd and 135th overall).)
3	86	Minnesota Vikings	Wyatt Davis	G	Ohio State	from Seattle via NY Jets (Note: No. 86: Seattle → NY Jets → Minnesota. Multiple trades: Seattle → NY Jets (PD). See Round 1: Seattle → NY Jets. NY Jets → Minnesota (D). See Round 1: Minnesota → NY Jets.)
3	87	Pittsburgh Steelers	Kendrick Green	C	Illinois	
3	88	San Francisco 49ers	Trey Sermon	RB	Ohio State	from LA Rams (Note: No. 88: LA Rams → San Francisco (D). The LA Rams traded a third-round selection (88th overall) to San Francisco in exchange for two fourth-round selections (117th and 121st overall).)
3	89	Houston Texans	Nico Collins ^{†}	WR	Michigan	from Cleveland via Carolina (Note: No. 89: Cleveland → Carolina → Houston. Multiple trades: Cleveland → Carolina (D). See Round 2: Carolina → Cleveland. Carolina → Houston (D). Carolina traded a third-round selection (89th overall) to Houston in exchange for fourth- and fifth-round selections (109th and 158th overall) and a 2022 fourth-round selection.)
3	90	Minnesota Vikings	Patrick Jones II	DE	Pittsburgh	from Baltimore (Note: No. 91: Baltimore → Minnesota (PD). Baltimore traded a third-round section and a conditional 2022 fifth-round selection to Minnesota in exchange for DE Yannick Ngakoue.)
3	91	Cleveland Browns	Anthony Schwartz	WR	Auburn	from New Orleans (Note: No. 91: New Orleans → Cleveland (PD). New Orleans traded a third-round selection (91st overall) and a 2020 third-round selection to Cleveland in exchange for 2020 third- and seventh-round selections.)
3	92	Tennessee Titans	Monty Rice	LB	Georgia	from Green Bay (Note: No. 92: Green Bay → Tennessee (D). See Round 3: Tennessee → Green Bay.)
3	93	Buffalo Bills	Spencer Brown	T	Northern Iowa	
3	94	Baltimore Ravens	Ben Cleveland	G	Georgia	from Kansas City (Note: No. 94: Kansas City → Baltimore (PD). See Round 1: Kansas City → Baltimore.)
3	95	Tampa Bay Buccaneers	Robert Hainsey	T	Notre Dame	
3*	96	New England Patriots	Ronnie Perkins	DE	Oklahoma	
3*	97	Los Angeles Chargers	Tre' McKitty	TE	Georgia	
3*	98	Denver Broncos	Quinn Meinerz ^{†}	G	Wisconsin–Whitewater	from New Orleans (Note: No. 98: New Orleans → Denver (D). See Round 3: Denver → New Orleans.)
3*	99	Dallas Cowboys	Nahshon Wright ^{†}	CB	Oregon State	
3*	100	Tennessee Titans	Elijah Molden	CB	Washington	
3*	101	Detroit Lions	Ifeatu Melifonwu	CB	Syracuse	from LA Rams (Note: No. 101: LA Rams → Detroit (PD). The LA Rams traded a third-round selection, a 2022 first-round selection, a 2023 first-round selection and QB Jared Goff to Detroit in exchange for QB Matthew Stafford.)
3×	102	San Francisco 49ers	Ambry Thomas	CB	Michigan	Resolution JC-2A selection (Note: San Francisco received a third-round selection (102nd overall), a 2022 third-round selection and a 2023 third-round selection as compensation for defensive coordinator Robert Saleh being hired by the NY Jets as head coach and vice president of player personnel Martin Mayhew being hired by Washington as general manager.)
3×	103	Los Angeles Rams	Ernest Jones	LB	South Carolina	Resolution JC-2A selection (Note: The LA Rams received a third-round selection (103rd overall) and a 2022 third-round selection as compensation for college scouting director Brad Holmes being hired by Detroit as general manager.)
3×	104	Baltimore Ravens	Brandon Stephens	CB	SMU	Resolution JC-2A selection (Note: Baltimore received a third-round selection (104th overall) and a 2022 third-round selection as compensation for assistant head coach and passing game coordinator David Culley being hired by Houston as head coach.)
3×	105	Denver Broncos	Baron Browning	LB	Ohio State	Resolution JC-2A selection (Note: New Orleans received a third-round selection (105th overall) and a 2022 third-round selection as compensation for director of pro scouting Terry Fontenot being hired by Atlanta as general manager.) from New Orleans (Note: No. 105: New Orleans → Denver (D). See Round 3: Denver → New Orleans.)
4	106	Jacksonville Jaguars	Jay Tufele	DT	USC	
4	107	New York Jets	Michael Carter	RB	North Carolina	
4	108	Atlanta Falcons	Darren Hall	CB	San Diego State	
4	109	Tennessee Titans	Dez Fitzpatrick	WR	Louisville	from Houston via Carolina (Note: No. 109: Houston → Carolina → Tennessee. Multiple trades: Houston → Carolina (D). See Round 3: Carolina → Houston. Carolina → Tennessee (D). Carolina traded a fourth-round selection (109th overall) to Tennessee in exchange for fourth-, fifth- and seventh-round selections (126th, 166th and 232nd overall).)
4	110	Cleveland Browns	James Hudson	T	Cincinnati	from Philadelphia (Note: No. 110: Philadelphia → Cleveland (PD). Philadelphia traded a fourth-round selection to Cleveland in exchange for pass rusher Genard Avery.)
4	111	Cincinnati Bengals	Cameron Sample	DE	Tulane	
4	112	Detroit Lions	Amon-Ra St. Brown ^{†}	WR	USC	
4	113	Detroit Lions	Derrick Barnes	LB	Purdue	from Carolina via Cleveland (Note: No. 113: Carolina → Cleveland → Detroit. Multiple trades: Carolina → Cleveland (D). See Round 2: Carolina → Cleveland. Cleveland → Detroit (D). Cleveland traded fourth- and seventh-round selections (113th and 257th overall) to Detroit in exchange for a fifth-round selection (153rd overall) and a 2022 fourth-round selection.)
4	114	Atlanta Falcons	Drew Dalman ^{†}	C	Stanford	from Denver (Note: No. 114: Denver → Atlanta (D). See Round 2: Atlanta → Denver.)
4	115	Dallas Cowboys	Jabril Cox	LB	LSU	
4	116	New York Giants	Elerson Smith	DE	Northern Iowa	
4	117	Los Angeles Rams	Bobby Brown III	DT	Texas A&M	from San Francisco (Note: No. 117: San Francisco → LA Rams (D). See Round 3: LA Rams → San Francisco.)
4	118	Los Angeles Chargers	Chris Rumph II	DE	Duke	
4	119	Minnesota Vikings	Kene Nwangwu	RB	Iowa State	
4	120	New England Patriots	Rhamondre Stevenson	RB	Oklahoma	
4	121	Jacksonville Jaguars	Jordan Smith	DE	UAB	from Las Vegas via Miami, Las Vegas, San Francisco and LA Rams (Note: No. 121: Las Vegas → Miami → Las Vegas → San Francisco → LA Rams. Multiple trades: Las Vegas → Miami (PD). Las Vegas traded a fourth-round selection (121st overall) to Miami in exchange for a fifth-round selection (162nd overall) and LB Raekwon McMillan. Miami → Las Vegas (PD). Miami traded a fourth-round selection (121st overall) to Las Vegas in exchange for a sixth-round selection (203rd overall) and WR Lynn Bowden. Las Vegas → San Francisco (D). See Round 2: San Francisco → Las Vegas. San Francisco → LA Rams (D). See Round 3: LA Rams → San Francisco. LA Rams → Jacksonville (D). The LA Rams traded fourth- and sixth-round selections (121st and 209th overall) to Jacksonville in exchange for fourth-, fifth- and seventh-round selections (130th, 170th and 249th overall).)
4	122	Cincinnati Bengals	Tyler Shelvin	DT	LSU	from Arizona via Houston and New England (Note: No. 122: Arizona → Houston → New England → Cincinnati. Multiple trades: Arizona → Houston (PD). Arizona traded a fourth-round selection (122nd overall), a 2020 second-round selection and RB David Johnson to Houston in exchange for a 2020 fourth-round selection and WR DeAndre Hopkins. Houston → New England (PD). Houston traded fourth- and sixth-round selections (122nd and 188th overall) to New England in exchange for fifth- and sixth-round selections (158th and 195th overall), and OT Marcus Cannon. New England → Cincinnati (D). See Round 2: Cincinnati → New England.)
4	123	Philadelphia Eagles	Zech McPhearson	CB	Texas Tech	from Miami (Note: No. 123: Miami → Philadelphia (PD). See Round 1: Philadelphia → Miami.)
4	124	Washington Football Team	John Bates	TE	Boise State	
4	125	Minnesota Vikings	Camryn Bynum	S	California	from Chicago (Note: No. 125: Chicago → Minnesota (PD). Chicago traded a fourth-round selection (125th overall) to Minnesota in exchange for a 2020 fifth-round selection.)
4	126	Carolina Panthers	Chuba Hubbard	RB	Oklahoma State	from Tennessee (Note: No. 126: Tennessee → Carolina (D). See Round 4: Carolina → Tennessee.)
4	127	Indianapolis Colts	Kylen Granson	TE	SMU	
4	128	Pittsburgh Steelers	Dan Moore	T	Texas A&M	
4	129	Tampa Bay Buccaneers	Jaelon Darden	WR	North Texas	from Seattle (Note: No. 129: Seattle → Tampa Bay (D). Seattle traded a fourth-round selection (129th overall) to Tampa Bay in exchange for fourth- and sixth-round selections (137th and 217th overall))
4	130	Los Angeles Rams	Robert Rochell	CB	Central Arkansas	from LA Rams via Jacksonville (Note: No. 130: LA Rams → Jacksonville → LA Rams. Multiple trades: LA Rams → Jacksonville (PD). See Round 1: LA Rams → Jacksonville. Jacksonville → LA Rams (D). See Round 4: LA Rams → Jacksonville.)
4	131	Baltimore Ravens	Tylan Wallace	WR	Oklahoma State	
4	132	Cleveland Browns	Tommy Togiai	DT	Ohio State	
4	133	New Orleans Saints	Ian Book	QB	Notre Dame	
4	134	Minnesota Vikings	Janarius Robinson	DE	Florida State	from Buffalo (Note: No. 134: Buffalo → Minnesota (PD). Buffalo traded a fourth-round selection, and 2020 first-, fifth- and sixth-round selections to Minnesota in exchange for a 2020 seventh-round selection and WR Stefon Diggs.)
4	135	Tennessee Titans	Rashad Weaver	DE	Pittsburgh	from Green Bay (Note: No. 135: Green Bay → Tennessee (D). See Round 3: Tennessee → Green Bay.)
4	136	Arizona Cardinals	Marco Wilson	CB	Florida	from Kansas City via Baltimore (Note: No. 136: Kansas City → Baltimore → Arizona. Multiple trades: Kansas City → Baltimore (PD). See Round 1: Kansas City → Baltimore. Baltimore → Arizona (D). Baltimore traded fourth- and sixth-round selections (136th and 210th overall) to Arizona in exchange for a fifth-round selection (160th overall) and a 2022 fourth-round selection.)
4	137	Seattle Seahawks	Tre Brown	CB	Oklahoma	from Tampa Bay (Note: No. 137: Tampa Bay → Seattle (D). See Round 4: Seattle → Tampa Bay.)
4*	138	Dallas Cowboys	Josh Ball	T	Marshall	
4*	139	Cincinnati Bengals	D'Ante Smith	T	East Carolina	from New England (Note: No. 122: New England → Cincinnati (D). See Round 2: Cincinnati → New England.)
4*	140	Pittsburgh Steelers	Buddy Johnson	LB	Texas A&M	
4*	141	Los Angeles Rams	Jacob Harris	WR	UCF	
4*	142	Green Bay Packers	Royce Newman	G	Ole Miss	
4*	143	Las Vegas Raiders	Tyree Gillespie	S	Missouri	from Minnesota via NY Jets (Note: No. 143: Minnesota → NY Jets → Las Vegas. Multiple trades: Minnesota → NY Jets (D). See Round 1: Minnesota → NY Jets. NY Jets → Las Vegas (D). The NY Jets traded a fourth-round selection (143rd overall) to Las Vegas in exchange for fifth- and sixth-round selections (162nd and 200th overall).)
4*	144	Kansas City Chiefs	Joshua Kaindoh	DE	Florida State	
5	145	Jacksonville Jaguars	Luke Farrell	TE	Ohio State	
5	146	New York Jets	Jamien Sherwood	S	Auburn	
5	147	Houston Texans	Brevin Jordan	TE	Miami (FL)	
5	148	Atlanta Falcons	Ta'Quon Graham	DE	Texas	
5	149	Cincinnati Bengals	Evan McPherson	K	Florida	
5	150	Philadelphia Eagles	Kenneth Gainwell	RB	Memphis	
5	151	Chicago Bears	Larry Borom	T	Missouri	from Carolina (Note: No. 151: Carolina → Chicago (D). See Round 2: Carolina → Chicago.)
5	152	Denver Broncos	Caden Sterns	S	Texas	
5	153	Cleveland Browns	Tony Fields II	LB	West Virginia	from Detroit (Note: No. 153: Detroit → Cleveland (D). See Round 4: Cleveland → Detroit.)
5	154	New York Jets	Michael Carter II	S	Duke	from NY Giants (Note: No. 154: NY Giants → NY Jets (PD). The NY Giants traded a fifth-round selection and a 2020 third-round selection to the NY Jets in exchange for DE Leonard Williams.)
5	155	San Francisco 49ers	Jaylon Moore	G	Western Michigan	
5	156	Pittsburgh Steelers	Isaiahh Loudermilk	DT	Wisconsin	from Dallas via Philadelphia and Miami (Note: No. 156: Dallas → Philadelphia → Miami → Pittsburgh. Multiple trades: Dallas → Philadelphia (PD). Dallas traded a fifth-round selection (156th overall) and a 2020 fifth-round selection to Philadelphia in exchange for a 2020 fourth-round selection. Philadelphia → Miami (PD). See Round 1: Philadelphia → Miami. Miami → Pittsburgh (D). Miami traded a fifth-round selection (156th overall) to Pittsburgh in exchange for a 2022 fourth-round selection.)
5	157	Minnesota Vikings	Ihmir Smith-Marsette	WR	Iowa	
5	158	Carolina Panthers	Daviyon Nixon	DT	Iowa	from New England via Houston (Note: No. 158: New England → Houston → Carolina. Multiple trades: New England → Houston (PD). See Round 4: Houston → New England. Houston → Carolina (D). See Round 3: Carolina → Houston.)
5	159	Los Angeles Chargers	Brenden Jaimes	T	Nebraska	
5	160	Baltimore Ravens	Shaun Wade	CB	Ohio State	from Arizona (Note: No. 160: Arizona → Baltimore (D). See Round 4: Baltimore → Arizona.)
5	161	Buffalo Bills	Tommy Doyle	T	Miami (OH)	from Las Vegas (Note: No. 161: Las Vegas → Buffalo (PD). Las Vegas traded a fifth-round selection to Buffalo in exchange for WR Zay Jones.)
5	162	Kansas City Chiefs	Noah Gray	TE	Duke	from Miami via Las Vegas and NY Jets (Note: No. 162: Miami → Las Vegas → NY Jets → Kansas City. Multiple trades: Miami → Las Vegas (PD). See Round 4: Las Vegas → Miami. Las Vegas → NY Jets (D). See Round 4: NY Jets → Las Vegas. NY Jets → Kansas City (D). The NY Jets traded fifth- and sixth-round selections (162nd and 226th overall) to Kansas City in exchange for fifth- and sixth-round selections (175th and 207th overall).)
5	163	Washington Football Team	Darrick Forrest	S	Cincinnati	
5	164	Denver Broncos	Jamar Johnson	S	Indiana	from Chicago via NY Giants (Note: No. 164: Chicago → NY Giants → Denver. Multiple trades: Chicago → NY Giants (D). See Round 1: NY Giants → Chicago. NY Giants → Denver (D). See Round 3: Denver → NY Giants.)
5	165	Indianapolis Colts	Shawn Davis	S	Florida	
5	166	Carolina Panthers	Keith Taylor	CB	Washington	from Tennessee (Note: No. 166: Tennessee → Carolina (D). See Round 4: Carolina → Tennessee.)
5	167	Las Vegas Raiders	Nate Hobbs	CB	Illinois	from Seattle (Note: No. 167: Seattle → Las Vegas (PD). Seattle traded a fifth-round selection to Las Vegas in exchange for G Gabe Jackson.)
5	168	Minnesota Vikings	Zach Davidson	TE	Central Missouri	from Pittsburgh via Baltimore (Note: No. 168: Pittsburgh → Baltimore → Minnesota. Multiple trades: Pittsburgh → Baltimore (PD). Pittsburgh traded a fifth-round selection (168th overall) to Baltimore in exchange for a seventh-round selection (254th overall) and DE Chris Wormley. Baltimore → Minnesota (PD). Baltimore traded a fifth-round selection (168th overall) and a 2020 seventh-round selection to Minnesota in exchange for 2020 sixth- and seventh-round selections.)
5	169	Cleveland Browns	Richard LeCounte	S	Georgia	from LA Rams (Note: No. 169: LA Rams → Cleveland (PD). The LA Rams traded a fifth-round selection to Cleveland in exchange for C Austin Corbett.)
5	170	Houston Texans	Garret Wallow	LB	TCU	from Cleveland via Jacksonville and LA Rams (Note: No. 170: Cleveland → Jacksonville → LA Rams → Houston. Multiple trades: Cleveland → Jacksonville (PD). Cleveland traded a fifth-round selection (170th overall) to Jacksonville in exchange for S Ronnie Harrison. Jacksonville → LA Rams (D). See Round 4: LA Rams → Jacksonville. LA Rams → Houston (D). The LA Rams traded a fifth-round selection (170th overall) to Houston in exchange for fifth- and seventh-round selections (174th and 233rd).)
5	171	Baltimore Ravens	Daelin Hayes	DE	Notre Dame	
5	172	San Francisco 49ers	Deommodore Lenoir	CB	Oregon	from New Orleans (Note: No. 172: New Orleans → San Francisco (PD). New Orleans traded a conditional fifth-round selection and LB Kiko Alonso to San Francisco in exchange for LB Kwon Alexander.)
5	173	Green Bay Packers	Tedarrell Slaton	DT	Florida	
5	174	Los Angeles Rams	Earnest Brown IV	DE	Northwestern	from Buffalo via Houston (Note: No. 174: Buffalo → Houston → LA Rams. Multiple trades: Buffalo → Houston (D). Buffalo traded a fifth-round selection (174th overall) to Houston in exchange for two sixth-round selections (203rd and 212th overall). Houston → LA Rams (D). See Round 5: LA Rams → Houston.)
5	175	New York Jets	Jason Pinnock	CB	Pittsburgh	from Kansas City (Note: No. 175: Kansas City → NY Jets (D). See Round 5: NY Jets → Kansas City.)
5	176	Tampa Bay Buccaneers	K. J. Britt	LB	Auburn	
5*	177	New England Patriots	Cameron McGrone	LB	Michigan	33rd compensatory selection (Note: The NFL originally announced 32 compensatory selections. On March 19, it released a revised list of 33 selections. After correcting an error in the original calculation, the Patriots earned an additional fifth-round compensatory selection. The NFL Management Council and NFLPA agreed to add an extra compensatory selection instead of removing a previously awarded one.)
5*	178	Green Bay Packers	Shemar Jean-Charles	CB	Appalachian State	
5*	179	Dallas Cowboys	Simi Fehoko	WR	Stanford	
5*	180	San Francisco 49ers	Talanoa Hufanga ^{†}	S	USC	
5*	181	Kansas City Chiefs	Cornell Powell	WR	Clemson	
5*	182	Atlanta Falcons	Adetokunbo Ogundeji	DE	Notre Dame	
5*	183	Atlanta Falcons	Avery Williams	CB	Boise State	
5*	184	Baltimore Ravens	Ben Mason	FB	Michigan	
6	185	Los Angeles Chargers	Nick Niemann	LB	Iowa	from Jacksonville via Tennessee (Note: No. 185: Jacksonville → Tennessee → LA Chargers. Multiple trades: Jacksonville → Tennessee (PD). Jacksonville traded a sixth-round selection to Tennessee in exchange for a seventh-round selection and LB Kamalei Correa. Tennessee → LA Chargers (PD). Tennessee traded a sixth-round selection to the LA Chargers in exchange for CB Desmond King.)
6	186	New York Jets	Hamsah Nasirildeen	S	Florida State	from NY Jets via New England (Note: No. 186: NY Jets → New England → NY Jets. Multiple trades: NY Jets → New England (PD). The NY Jets traded a sixth-round selection to New England in exchange for WR Demaryius Thomas. New England → NY Jets (PD). New England traded a sixth-round selection (186th overall) and two 2020 fourth-round selections to the NY Jets in exchange for a 2020 third-round selection.)
6	187	Atlanta Falcons	Frank Darby	WR	Arizona State	
6	188	New England Patriots	Joshuah Bledsoe	S	Missouri	from Houston (Note: No. 188: Houston → New England (PD). See Round 4: Houston → New England.)
6	189	Philadelphia Eagles	Marlon Tuipulotu	DT	USC	
6	190	Cincinnati Bengals	Trey Hill	C	Georgia	
6	191	Philadelphia Eagles	Tarron Jackson	DE	Coastal Carolina	from Denver via Carolina (Note: No. 191: Denver → Carolina → Philadelphia. Multiple trades: Denver → Carolina (PD). Denver traded a sixth-round selection to Carolina in exchange for QB Teddy Bridgewater. Carolina → Philadelphia (D). See Round 3: Philadelphia → Carolina.)
6	192	Dallas Cowboys	Quinton Bohanna	DT	Kentucky	from Detroit (Note: No. 192: Detroit → Dallas (PD). Detroit traded a conditional sixth-round selection to Dallas in exchange for DE Everson Griffen, who met the conditions for that selection.)
6	193	Carolina Panthers	Deonte Brown	G	Alabama	
6	194	San Francisco 49ers	Elijah Mitchell	RB	Louisiana	
6	195	Houston Texans	Roy Lopez	DT	Arizona	from Dallas via New England (Note: No. 195: Dallas → New England → Houston. Multiple trades: Dallas → New England (PD). Dallas traded a sixth-round selection to New England in exchange for DE Michael Bennett. New England → Houston (PD). See Round 4: Houston → New England.)
6	196	New York Giants	Gary Brightwell	RB	Arizona	
6	197	New England Patriots	Will Sherman	T	Colorado	
6	198	Los Angeles Chargers	Larry Rountree III	RB	Missouri	
6	199	Minnesota Vikings	Jaylen Twyman	DT	Pittsburgh	
6	200	New York Jets	Brandin Echols	CB	Kentucky	Forfeiture of selection announced, but later rescinded; (Note: Las Vegas originally forfeited a sixth-round selection as punishment for repeated COVID-19 protocol violations during the 2020 season, but this penalty was not reflected in the NFL's official release of draft picks.) from Las Vegas (Note: No. 200: Las Vegas → NY Jets (D). See Round 4: NY Jets → Las Vegas.)
6	201	New York Giants	Rodarius Williams	CB	Oklahoma State	from Arizona (Note: No. 201: Arizona → NY Giants (PD). Arizona traded a sixth-round selection to the NY Giants in exchange for LB Markus Golden.)
6	202	Cincinnati Bengals	Chris Evans	RB	Michigan	from Miami via Houston (Note: No. 202: Miami → Houston → Cincinnati. Multiple trades: Miami → Houston (PD). See Round 1: Houston → Miami. Houston → Cincinnati (PD). Houston traded a sixth-round selection (202nd overall) to Cincinnati in exchange for a seventh-round selection (233rd overall) and QB Ryan Finley.)
6	203	Buffalo Bills	Marquez Stevenson	WR	Houston	from Washington via Las Vegas, Miami and Houston (Note: No. 203: Washington → Las Vegas → Miami → Houston → Buffalo. Multiple trades: Washington → Las Vegas (PD). Washington traded a sixth-round selection (203rd overall) to Las Vegas in exchange for a seventh-round selection (244th overall) and OT David Sharpe. Las Vegas → Miami (PD). See Round 4: Miami → Las Vegas. Miami was originally supposed to receive Las Vegas' original sixth-round selection that was initially forfeited for repeated COVID-19 protocol violations during the 2020 season but later reinstated on appeal. Miami → Houston (PD) Miami traded a sixth-round selection (203rd overall) and DE Shaq Lawson to Houston in exchange for a seventh-round selection (231st overall) and LB Benardrick McKinney. Houston → Buffalo (D). See Round 5: Buffalo → Houston.)
6	204	Carolina Panthers	Shi Smith	WR	South Carolina	from Chicago (Note: No. 204: Chicago → Carolina (D). See Round 2: Carolina → Chicago.)
6	205	Tennessee Titans	Racey McMath	WR	LSU	
6	206	New Orleans Saints	Landon Young	T	Kentucky	from Indianapolis (Note: No. 206: Indianapolis → New Orleans (D). Indianapolis traded a sixth-round selection (206th overall) to New Orleans in exchange for sixth- and seventh-round selections (218th and 229th overall.))
6	207	New York Jets	Jonathan Marshall	DT	Arkansas	from Pittsburgh via Miami and Kansas City (Note: No. 207: Pittsburgh → Miami → Kansas City → NY Jets. Multiple trades: Pittsburgh → Miami (PD). Pittsburgh traded a sixth-round selection (207th overall), and 2020 first- and fifth-round selections to Miami in exchange for a seventh-round selection (245th overall), a 2020 fourth-round selection and S Minkah Fitzpatrick. Miami → Kansas City (PD). Miami traded a sixth-round selection (207th overall) to Kansas City in exchange for a seventh-round selection (258th overall) and RB DeAndré Washington. Kansas City → NY Jets (D). See Round 5: NY Jets → Kansas City.)
6	208	Seattle Seahawks	Stone Forsythe	T	Florida	from Seattle via Miami and Chicago (Note: No. 208: Seattle → Miami → Chicago → Seattle. Multiple trades: Seattle → Miami (PD). Seattle traded a sixth-round selection (208th overall) to Miami in exchange for a 2020 seventh-round selection. Miami → Chicago (PD). Miami traded a conditional sixth-round selection (208th overall) to Chicago in exchange for TE Adam Shaheen; the sixth-round selection was upgraded from the seventh round after the conditions were met. Chicago → Seattle (D). Chicago traded a sixth-round selection (208th overall) to Seattle in exchange for sixth- and seventh-round selections (217th and 250th overall).)
6	209	Jacksonville Jaguars	Jalen Camp	WR	Georgia Tech	from LA Rams (Note: No. 209: LA Rams → Jacksonville (D). See Round 4: LA Rams → Jacksonville.)
6	210	Arizona Cardinals	Victor Dimukeje	DE	Duke	from Baltimore (Note: No. 210: Baltimore → Arizona (D). See Round 4: Baltimore → Arizona.)
6	211	Cleveland Browns	Demetric Felton	RB	UCLA	
6	212	Buffalo Bills	Damar Hamlin	S	Pittsburgh	from New Orleans via Houston (Note: No. 212: New Orleans → Houston → Buffalo. Multiple trades: New Orleans → Houston (PD). New Orleans traded a sixth-round selection to Houston in exchange for a 2020 seventh-round selection. Houston → Buffalo (D). See Round 5: Buffalo → Houston.)
6	213	Buffalo Bills	Rachad Wildgoose	CB	Wisconsin	
6	214	Green Bay Packers	Cole Van Lanen	G	Wisconsin	
6	215	Tennessee Titans	Brady Breeze	S	Oregon	from Kansas City (Note: No. 215: Kansas City → Tennessee (PD). Kansas City traded a sixth-round selection to Tennessee in exchange for a 2020 seventh-round selection.)
6	216	Pittsburgh Steelers	Quincy Roche	DE	Miami (FL)	from Tampa Bay (Note: No. 216: Tampa Bay → Pittsburgh (PD). Tampa Bay traded a sixth-round selection (216th overall) to Pittsburgh in exchange for a seventh-round selection (251st overall) and OT Jerald Hawkins.)
6*	217	Chicago Bears	Khalil Herbert	RB	Virginia Tech	from Tampa Bay via Seattle (Note: No. 217: Tampa Bay → Seattle → Chicago. Multiple trades: Tampa Bay → Seattle (D). See Round 4: Seattle → Tampa Bay. Seattle → Chicago (D). See Round 6: Chicago → Seattle.)
6*	218	Indianapolis Colts	Sam Ehlinger	QB	Texas	from New Orleans (Note: No. 218: New Orleans → Indianapolis (D). See Round 6: Indianapolis → New Orleans.)
6*	219	Denver Broncos	Seth Williams	WR	Auburn	from Atlanta (Note: No. 219: Atlanta → Denver (D). See Round 2: Atlanta → Denver.)
6*	220	Green Bay Packers	Isaiah McDuffie	LB	Boston College	
6*	221	Chicago Bears	Dazz Newsome	WR	North Carolina	
6*	222	Carolina Panthers	Thomas Fletcher	LS	Alabama	
6*	223	Arizona Cardinals	Tay Gowan	CB	UCF	from Minnesota (Note: No. 223: Arizona → Las Vegas (PD). Minnesota traded a sixth-round selection to Arizona in exchange for C Mason Cole.)
6*	224	Philadelphia Eagles	JaCoby Stevens	S	LSU	
6*	225	Washington Football Team	Camaron Cheeseman	LS	Michigan	from Philadelphia (Note: No. 225: Philadelphia → Washington (D). Philadelphia traded sixth- and seventh-round selections (225th and 240th overall) to Washington in exchange for a 2022 fifth-round selection.)
6*	226	Kansas City Chiefs	Trey Smith ^{†}	G	Tennessee	from Carolina via NY Jets (Note: No. 226: Carolina → NY Jets → Kansas City. Multiple trades: Carolina → NY Jets (PD). Carolina traded a sixth-round selection (226th overall), and 2022 second- and fourth-round selections to the NY Jets in exchange for QB Sam Darnold. NY Jets → Kansas City (D). See Round 5: NY Jets → Kansas City.)
6*	227	Dallas Cowboys	Israel Mukuamu	CB	South Carolina	
6*	228	Chicago Bears	Thomas Graham Jr.	CB	Oregon	
7	229	Indianapolis Colts	Mike Strachan	WR	Charleston (WV)	from Jacksonville via New Orleans (Note: No. 229: Jacksonville → New Orleans → Indianapolis. Multiple trades: Jacksonville → New Orleans (PD). Jacksonville traded a seventh-round selection (229th overall) to New Orleans in exchange for DT Malcom Brown. New Orleans → Indianapolis (D). See Round 6: Indianapolis → New Orleans.)
7	230	Las Vegas Raiders	Jimmy Morrissey	C	Pittsburgh	from NY Jets via San Francisco (Note: No. 230: NY Jets → San Francisco → Las Vegas. Multiple trades: NY Jets → San Francisco (PD). The NY Jets traded a seventh-round selection and LB Jordan Willis to San Francisco in exchange for a 2022 sixth-round selection. San Francisco → Las Vegas (D). See Round 2: San Francisco → Las Vegas.)
7	231	Miami Dolphins	Larnel Coleman	T	UMass	from Houston (Note: No. 231: Houston → Miami (PD). See Round 6: Miami → Houston.)
7	232	Carolina Panthers	Phil Hoskins	DT	Kentucky	from Atlanta via Miami and Tennessee (Note: No. 232: Atlanta → Miami → Tennessee → Carolina. Multiple trades: Atlanta → Miami (PD). Atlanta traded a seventh-round selection (232nd overall) to Miami in exchange for DE Charles Harris. Miami → Tennessee (PD). Miami traded a seventh-round selection (232nd overall) to Tennessee in exchange for a 2022 seventh-round selection and OT Isaiah Wilson. Tennessee → Carolina (D). See Round 4: Carolina → Tennessee.)
7	233	Los Angeles Rams	Jake Funk	RB	Maryland	from Cincinnati via Houston (Note: No. 233: Cincinnati → Houston → LA Rams. Multiple trades: Cincinnati → Houston (PD). See Round 6: Houston → Cincinnati. Houston → LA Rams (D). See Round 5: LA Rams → Houston.)
7	234	Philadelphia Eagles	Patrick Johnson	DE	Tulane	
7	235	Cincinnati Bengals	Wyatt Hubert	DE	Kansas State	from Detroit via Seattle (Note: No. 235: Detroit → Seattle → Cincinnati. Multiple trades: Detroit → Seattle (PD). Detroit traded a seventh-round selection (235th overall) and S Quandre Diggs to Seattle in exchange for a 2020 fifth-round selection. Seattle → Cincinnati (PD). Seattle traded a seventh-round selection (235th overall) and C B. J. Finney to Cincinnati in exchange for DE Carlos Dunlap.)
7	236	Buffalo Bills	Jack Anderson	G	Texas Tech	from Carolina (Note: No. 236: Carolina → Buffalo (PD). Carolina traded a seventh-round selection to Buffalo in exchange for OT Marshall Newhouse.)
7	237	Denver Broncos	Kary Vincent Jr.	CB	LSU	
7	238	Dallas Cowboys	Matt Farniok	G	Nebraska	
7	239	Denver Broncos	Jonathon Cooper	DE	Ohio State	from NY Giants (Note: No. 239: NY Giants → Denver (PD). The NY Giants traded a seventh-round selection (239th overall) to Denver in exchange for CB Isaac Yiadom.)
7	240	Washington Football Team	William Bradley-King	DE	Baylor	from San Francisco via Philadelphia (Note: No. 240: San Francisco → Philadelphia → Washington. Multiple trades: San Francisco → Philadelphia (PD). San Francisco traded a seventh-round selection, a 2020 sixth-round selection (210th overall) and WR Marquise Goodwin to Philadelphia in exchange for a 2020 sixth-round selection (190th overall) and the right to have Goodwin revert to the 49ers after the 2020 NFL season. Philadelphia → Washington (D). See Round 6: Philadelphia → Washington.)
7	241	Los Angeles Chargers	Mark Webb	S	Georgia	
7	–	Minnesota Vikings	Selection forfeited (Note: Minnesota forfeited a seventh-round selection as punishment for a salary cap violation involving a 2019 practice squad player.)			
7	242	New England Patriots	Tre Nixon	WR	UCF	
7	243	Arizona Cardinals	James Wiggins	S	Cincinnati	
7	244	Miami Dolphins	Gerrid Doaks	RB	Cincinnati	from Las Vegas via Washington (Note: No. 244: Las Vegas → Washington → Miami. Multiple trades: Las Vegas → Washington (PD). See Round 6: Washington → Las Vegas. Washington → Miami (PD). Washington traded a seventh-round selection (244th overall) to Miami in exchange for a seventh-round selection (258th overall) and G Ereck Flowers.)
7	245	Pittsburgh Steelers	Tre Norwood	CB	Oklahoma	from Miami (Note: No. 245: Miami → Pittsburgh (PD). See Round 6: Pittsburgh → Miami.)
7	246	Washington Football Team	Shaka Toney	DE	Penn State	
7	247	Arizona Cardinals	Michal Menet	C	Penn State	from Chicago via Las Vegas (Note: No. 247: Chicago → Las Vegas → Arizona. Multiple trades: Chicago → Las Vegas (PD). Chicago traded a conditional seventh-round selection (247th overall) to Las Vegas in exchange for K Eddy Piñeiro. Las Vegas → Arizona (PD). See Round 3: Arizona → Las Vegas.)
7	248	Indianapolis Colts	Will Fries	G	Penn State	
7	249	Los Angeles Rams	Ben Skowronek ^{†}	WR	Notre Dame	from Tennessee via Jacksonville (Note: No. 249: Tennessee → Jacksonville → LA Rams. Multiple trades: Tennessee → Jacksonville (PD). See Round 6: Tennessee → Jacksonville. Jacksonville → LA Rams (D). See Round 4: LA Rams → Jacksonville.)
7	250	Chicago Bears	Khyiris Tonga	DT	BYU	from Seattle (Note: No. 250: Seattle → Chicago (D). See Round 6: Chicago → Seattle.)
7	251	Tampa Bay Buccaneers	Chris Wilcox	CB	BYU	from Pittsburgh (Note: No. 251: Pittsburgh → Tampa Bay (PD). See Round 6: Pittsburgh → Tampa Bay.)
7	252	Los Angeles Rams	Chris Garrett	LB	Concordia–St. Paul	
7	253	Denver Broncos	Marquiss Spencer	DE	Mississippi State	from Cleveland (Note: No. 253: Cleveland → Denver (PD). Cleveland traded a seventh-round selection (253rd overall) to Denver in exchange for FB Andy Janovich.)
7	254	Pittsburgh Steelers	Pressley Harvin III	P	Georgia Tech	from Baltimore (Note: No. 254: Baltimore → Pittsburgh (PD). See Round 5: Pittsburgh → Baltimore.); 2020 Ray Guy Award winner
7	255	New Orleans Saints	Kawaan Baker	WR	South Alabama	Forfeiture of selection announced, but later rescinded (Note: While New Orleans forfeited a seventh-round selection as punishment for repeated COVID-19 protocol violations during the 2020 season, the penalty was not included in the NFL's official draft order.)
7	256	Green Bay Packers	Kylin Hill	RB	Mississippi State	
7	257	Detroit Lions	Jermar Jefferson	RB	Oregon State	from Buffalo via Cleveland (Note: No. 257: Buffalo → Cleveland → Detroit. Multiple trades: Buffalo → Cleveland (PD). Buffalo traded a seventh-round selection (257th overall) and G Wyatt Teller to Cleveland in exchange for 2020 fifth- and sixth-round selections. Cleveland → Detroit (D). See Round 4: Cleveland → Detroit.)
7	258	Washington Football Team	Dax Milne	WR	BYU	from Kansas City via Miami (Note: No. 258: Kansas City → Miami → Washington. Multiple trades: Kansas City → Miami (PD). See Round 6: Miami → Kansas City. Miami → Washington (PD). See Round 7: Washington → Miami.)
7	259	Tampa Bay Buccaneers	Grant Stuard	LB	Houston	Mr. Irrelevant

== Notable undrafted players ==
Original NFL team	Player	Pos.	College	Notes
Atlanta Falcons	Caleb Huntley	RB	Ball State	
Atlanta Falcons	Ryan Neuzil	G	Appalachian State	
Atlanta Falcons	Kion Smith	G	Fayetteville State	
Baltimore Ravens	Ar'Darius Washington	S	TCU	
Buffalo Bills	Nick McCloud	CB	Notre Dame	
Buffalo Bills	Quintin Morris	TE	Bowling Green	
Chicago Bears	Caleb Johnson	LB	Houston Baptist	
Chicago Bears	Sam Kamara	DE	Stony Brook	
Cincinnati Bengals	Drue Chrisman	P	Ohio State	
Denver Broncos	Adam Prentice	FB	South Carolina	
Denver Broncos	Curtis Robinson	LB	Stanford	
Detroit Lions	Jerry Jacobs	CB	Arkansas	
Detroit Lions	Tommy Kraemer	G	Notre Dame	
Detroit Lions	A. J. Parker	CB	Kansas State	
Detroit Lions	Brock Wright	TE	Notre Dame	
Green Bay Packers	Jack Heflin	DT	Iowa	
Houston Texans	Ryan McCollum	C	Texas A&M	
Indianapolis Colts	Deon Jackson	RB	Duke	
Jacksonville Jaguars	Tim Jones	WR	Southern Miss	
Kansas City Chiefs	Zayne Anderson	S	BYU	
Kansas City Chiefs	Malik Herring	DE	Georgia	
Kansas City Chiefs	Devon Key	S	Western Kentucky	
Los Angeles Chargers	Amen Ogbongbemiga	LB	Oklahoma State	
Los Angeles Rams	Alaric Jackson	T	Iowa	
Los Angeles Rams	Jordan Meredith	C	Western Kentucky	
Miami Dolphins	Robert Jones	G	Middle Tennessee	
Minnesota Vikings	Christian Elliss	LB	Idaho	
Minnesota Vikings	Riley Patterson	K	Memphis	
Philadelphia Eagles	Kayode Awosika	T	Buffalo	
Philadelphia Eagles	Jack Stoll	TE	Nebraska	
Seattle Seahawks	Jake Curhan	T	California	
Tennessee Titans	Naquan Jones	NT	Michigan State	
Washington Football Team	Jaret Patterson	RB	Buffalo	

== Trades ==
(PD) indicates trades completed prior to the start of the draft (i.e. Pre-Draft), while (D) denotes trades which took place during the draft.

Round 1

Round 2

Round 3

Round 4

Round 5

Round 6

Round 7

== Resolution JC-2A picks ==
Resolution JC-2A, which was enacted by the NFL in November 2020, rewards teams for developing minority candidates for head coach and/or general manager positions. The resolution rewards teams whose minority candidates are hired away for one of those positions by awarding draft picks. These draft picks are at the end of the third round, after standard compensatory picks; if multiple teams qualify, they are awarded in draft order from the first round. These picks are in addition to, and have no impact on, the standard 32 compensatory picks. Four picks have been awarded for the draft pursuant to the resolution.

== Notes ==
Forfeited picks

== Summary ==
=== Selections by NCAA conference ===
Conference	Round 1	Round 2	Round 3	Round 4	Round 5	Round 6	Round 7	Total
NCAA Division I FBS football conferences
American	2	1	2	5	2	2	5	19
ACC	6	5	9	6	5	9	2	42
Big 12	0	4	2	6	4	2	4	22
Big Ten	7	4	9	2	11	5	6	44
C-USA	0	0	1	3	0	0	0	4
Ind. (FBS)	1	3	3	1	2	0	5	15
MAC	0	1	1	0	2	0	0	4
MW	0	0	0	2	1	0	0	3
Pac-12	3	3	5	4	4	8	1	28
SEC	12	10	7	8	7	16	5	65
Sun Belt	0	0	0	0	1	2	1	4
NCAA Division I FCS football conferences
MVFC	1	1	1	1	0	0	0	4
Southland	0	0	0	1	0	0	0	1
Non-Division I NCAA football conferences
MEC (DII)	0	0	0	0	0	0	1	1
MIAA (DII)	0	0	0	0	1	0	0	1
NSIC (DII)	0	0	0	0	0	0	1	1
WIAC (DIII)	0	0	1	0	0	0	0	1

A new record-high 65 players were drafted from one conference, the most in NFL history, surpassing the previous number of selections, 64, in 2019. Both numbers were set by the Southeastern Conference.

=== Colleges with multiple draft selections ===
Selections	Colleges
10	Alabama, Ohio State
9	Georgia, Notre Dame
8	Florida, Michigan
7	LSU
6	Kentucky, Penn State, Pittsburgh
5	BYU, Clemson, Missouri, North Carolina, Oklahoma, Oregon, Stanford, Texas, UCF, USC
4	Auburn, Cincinnati, Duke, Florida State, Iowa, Miami (FL), Oklahoma State, South Carolina, Texas A&M, Virginia Tech, Washington
3	Houston, Northwestern, Wisconsin
2	Arizona, Boise State, Boston College, Georgia Tech, Illinois, Louisville, Minnesota, Mississippi State, Nebraska, North Dakota State, Northern Iowa, Ole Miss, Oregon State, Purdue, SMU, Syracuse, TCU, Tennessee, Texas Tech, Tulane, UCLA, Western Michigan

=== Selections by position ===
Position	Round 1	Round 2	Round 3	Round 4	Round 5	Round 6	Round 7	Total
Center	0	3	1	1	0	1	2	8
Cornerback	5	3	8	6	7	6	3	38
Defensive end	6	3	5	7	4	3	6	34
Defensive tackle	0	2	3	4	3	5	2	19
Fullback	0	0	0	0	1	0	0	1
Guard	1	1	3	1	1	3	3	13
Kicker	0	0	0	0	1	0	0	1
Linebacker	3	3	4	3	4	2	2	21
Long snapper	0	0	0	0	0	2	0	2
Offensive tackle	4	6	4	4	3	3	1	25
Punter	0	0	0	0	0	0	1	1
Quarterback	5	1	2	1	0	1	0	10
Running back	2	1	1	4	1	5	4	18
Safety	0	3	2	1	8	5	2	21
Tight end	1	1	3	2	4	0	0	11
Wide receiver	5	5	5	5	3	8	5	36

Position	Round 1	Round 2	Round 3	Round 4	Round 5	Round 6	Round 7	Total
Offense	18	18	19	18	13	21	15	122
Defense	14	14	22	21	26	21	15	133
Special teams	0	0	0	0	1	2	1	4
