= Oklahoma State Cowboys football statistical leaders =

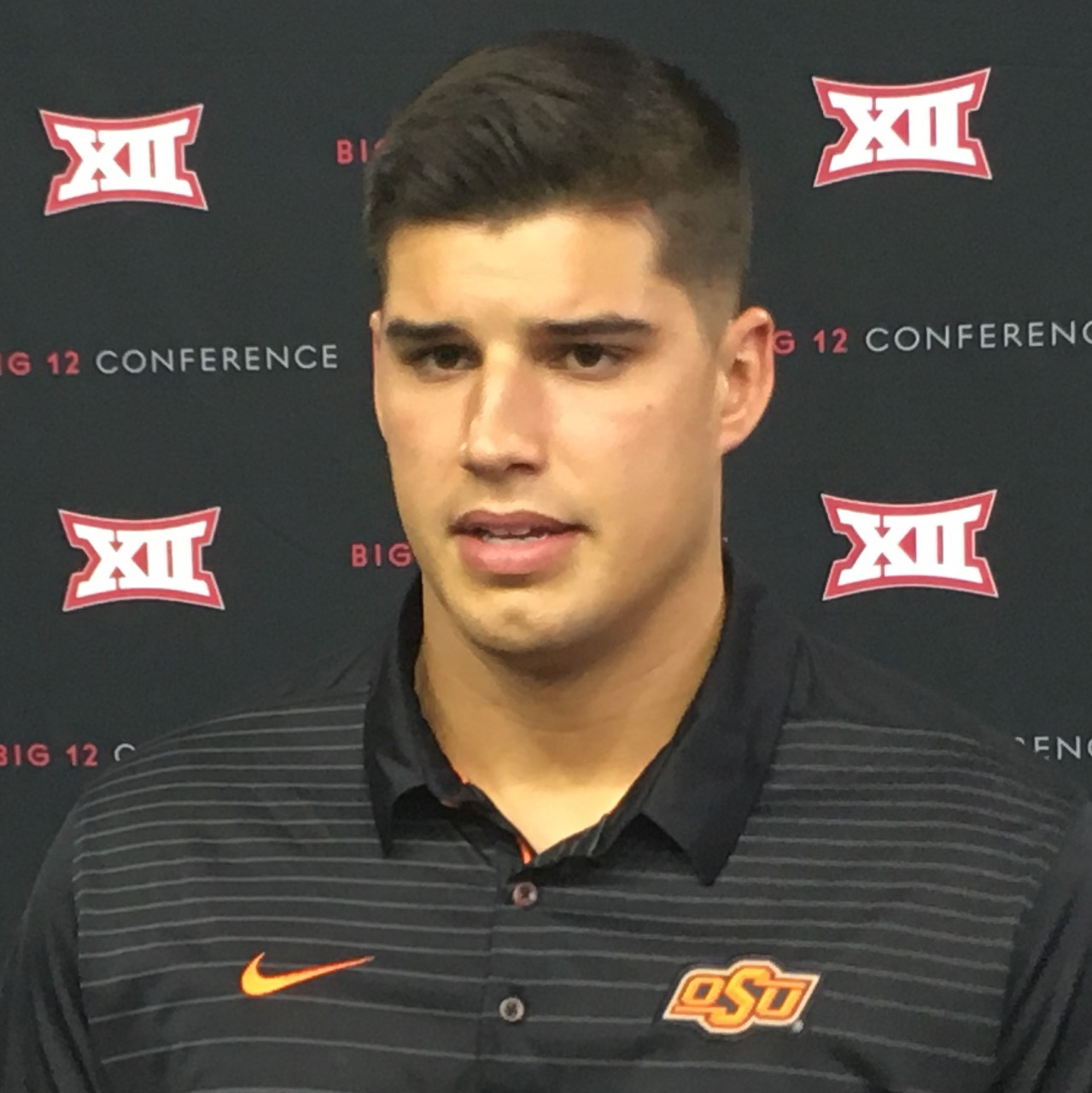
Mason Rudolph is the Cowboys' career leader in passing yards, touchdowns, and total offense.

The Oklahoma State Cowboys football statistical leaders are individual statistical leaders of the Oklahoma State Cowboys football program in various categories, including passing, rushing, receiving, total offense, defensive stats, kicking, and scoring. Within those areas, the lists identify single-game, single-season, and career leaders. The Cowboys represent Oklahoma State University–Stillwater in the NCAA Division I FBS Big 12 Conference.

Although Oklahoma State began competing in intercollegiate football in 1901, the school's official record book considers the "modern era" to have begun in 1945. Records from before this year are often incomplete and inconsistent, and they are generally not included in these lists.

These lists are dominated by more recent players for several reasons:

- Since 1945, seasons have increased from 10 games to 11 and then 12 games in length.
- The NCAA didn't allow freshmen to play varsity football until 1972 (with the exception of the World War II years), allowing players to have four-year careers.
- The Cowboys have played in 26 bowl games in their history, with 14 of them coming since 2002. While the NCAA didn't count bowl game statistics until 2002, and most schools follow this policy, Oklahoma State's official records count all bowl game statistics. This means that while the NCAA recognizes Barry Sanders' single-season rushing yards record of 2,628 as the national record, Oklahoma State counts his stats from the 1988 Holiday Bowl as well and recognizes the record as 2,850 yards.
- Oklahoma State played in the Big 12 Championship Game in 2021, giving players in that season yet another game to accumulate statistics.
- Due to COVID-19 issues, the NCAA declared that the 2020 season would not count against the athletic eligibility of any football player, thus giving every player active in that season the opportunity for five years of eligibility instead of the normal four.

These lists are updated through Week 12 of the 2026 season. Active players are listed in bold.

== Passing ==
=== Passing yards ===
Career
Rank	Player	Yards	Years
1	Mason Rudolph	13,618	2014 2015 2016 2017
2	Spencer Sanders	9,553	2019 2020 2021 2022
3	Brandon Weeden	9,260	2008 2009 2010 2011
4	Mike Gundy	8,473	1986 1987 1988 1989
5	Zac Robinson	8,317	2006 2007 2008 2009
6	Josh Fields	6,090	2001 2002 2003
7	Alan Bowman	5,883	2023 2024
8	Tone' Jones	4,812	1993 1994 1995 1996
9	Clint Chelf	4,277	2010 2011 2012 2013
10	Taylor Cornelius	4,198	2015 2016 2017 2018

Single season
Rank	Player	Yards	Year
1	Mason Rudolph	4,904	2017
2	Brandon Weeden	4,727	2011
3	Brandon Weeden	4,277	2010
4	Mason Rudolph	4,091	2016
5	Taylor Cornelius	3,978	2018
6	Mason Rudolph	3,770	2015
7	**Drew Mestemaker**	3,533	2026
8	Alan Bowman	3,460	2023
9	Josh Fields	3,145	2002
10	Zac Robinson	3,064	2008

Single game
Rank	Player	Yards	Year	Opponent
1	Mason Rudolph	540	2016	Pittsburgh
2	Brandon Weeden	502	2011	Kansas State
3	Taylor Cornelius	501	2018	Oklahoma
4	Mason Rudolph	497	2017	Pittsburgh
5	Brandon Weeden	476	2011	Iowa State
6	Mason Rudolph	459	2017	Baylor
7	Mason Rudolph	457	2016	Kansas State
8	Mason Rudolph	448	2017	Oklahoma
9	Brandon Weeden	438	2011	Texas A&M
	Mason Rudolph	438	2017	Kansas

=== Passing touchdowns ===
Career
Rank	Player	TDs	Years
1	Mason Rudolph	92	2014 2015 2016 2017
2	Brandon Weeden	75	2008 2009 2010 2011
3	Spencer Sanders	67	2019 2020 2021 2022
4	Zac Robinson	66	2006 2007 2008 2009
5	Mike Gundy	57	1986 1987 1988 1989
6	Josh Fields	55	2001 2002 2003
7	Clint Chelf	37	2010 2011 2012 2013
8	J.W. Walsh	36	2012 2013 2014 2015
9	Taylor Cornelius	32	2015 2016 2017 2018
10	Alan Bowman	31	2023 2024

Single season
Rank	Player	TDs	Year
1	Brandon Weeden	37	2011
	Mason Rudolph	37	2017
3	Brandon Weeden	34	2010
4	Taylor Cornelius	32	2018
5	Josh Fields	31	2002
6	**Drew Mestemaker**	30	2026
7	Mason Rudolph	28	2016
8	Zac Robinson	25	2008
9	Bobby Reid	24	2006
10	Zac Robinson	23	2007

Single game
Rank	Player	TDs	Year	Opponent
1	Josh Fields	7	2003	SMU
2	Josh Fields	6	2002	Kansas
	Brandon Weeden	6	2010	Tulsa
4	14 times by 7 players	5	Most recent: Drew Mestemaker, 2026 vs. Iowa State	

== Rushing ==
=== Rushing yards ===
Career
Rank	Player	Yards	Years
1	Thurman Thomas	5,001	1984 1985 1986 1987
2	Terry Miller	4,754	1974 1975 1976 1977
3	David Thompson	4,318	1993 1994 1995 1996
4	Kendall Hunter	4,181	2007 2008 2009 2010
5	Barry Sanders	3,797	1986 1987 1988
6	Ernest Anderson	3,780	1979 1980 1981 1982 1983
7	Justice Hill	3,539	2016 2017 2018
8	Chuba Hubbard	3,459	2018 2019 2020
9	Tatum Bell	3,409	2000 2001 2002 2003
10	Joseph Randle	3,085	2010 2011 2012

Single season
Rank	Player	Yards	Year
1	Barry Sanders	2,850	1988
2	Chuba Hubbard	2,094	2019
3	Terry Miller	1,887	1976
4	Ernest Anderson	1,877	1982
5	Thurman Thomas	1,767	1987
6	Ollie Gordon II	1,732	2023
7	Terry Miller	1,680	1977
8	Thurman Thomas	1,650	1985
9	Gerald Hudson	1,642	1990
10	Kendall Hunter	1,555	2008

Single game
Rank	Player	Yards	Year	Opponent
1	Barry Sanders	332	1988	Texas Tech
2	David Thompson	321	1996	Baylor
3	Barry Sanders	320	1988	Kansas State
4	Barry Sanders	312	1988	Kansas
5	Barry Sanders	304	1988	Tulsa
6	Chuba Hubbard	296	2019	Kansas State
7	Thurman Thomas	293	1987	Iowa State
	Barry Sanders	293	1988	Iowa State
9	Ollie Gordon II	282	2023	West Virginia
10	Ollie Gordon II	271	2023	Cincinnati

=== Rushing touchdowns ===
Career
Rank	Player	TDs	Years
1	Barry Sanders	53	1986 1987 1988
2	Terry Miller	49	1974 1975 1976 1977
3	Thurman Thomas	47	1984 1985 1986 1987
4	Joseph Randle	40	2010 2011 2012
5	Kendall Hunter	37	2007 2008 2009 2010
6	Ollie Gordon II	36	2022 2023 2024
7	Tatum Bell	34	2000 2001 2002 2003
	Jeremy Smith	34	2009 2010 2011 2012 2013
9	Chuba Hubbard	33	2018 2019 2020
10	Justice Hill	30	2016 2017 2018

Single season
Rank	Player	TDs	Year
1	Barry Sanders	42	1988
2	Terry Miller	27	1976
3	Joseph Randle	24	2011
4	Thurman Thomas	21	1987
	Chuba Hubbard	21	2019
	Ollie Gordon II	21	2023
7	Tatum Bell	16	2003
	Kendall Hunter	16	2008
	Kendall Hunter	16	2010
10	Thurman Thomas	15	1985
	Justice Hill	15	2017

Single game
Rank	Player	TDs	Year	Opponent
1	Barry Sanders	5	1988	Tulsa
	Barry Sanders	5	1988	Kansas
	Barry Sanders	5	1988	Wyoming (Holiday Bowl)
	Ollie Gordon II	5	2023	BYU
5	16 times by 10 players	4	Most recent: Ollie Gordon, 2023 vs. West Virginia	

== Receiving ==
=== Receptions ===
Career
Rank	Player	Rec	Years
1	Brennan Presley	315	2020 2021 2022 2023 2024
2	Rashaun Woods	293	2000 2001 2002 2003
3	Justin Blackmon	253	2009 2010 2011
4	James Washington	226	2014 2015 2016 2017
5	Hart Lee Dykes	224	1985 1986 1987 1988
6	Tylan Wallace	205	2017 2018 2019 2020
7	Dillon Stoner	191	2016 2017 2018 2019 2020
8	Josh Stewart	180	2011 2012 2013
9	Jalen McCleskey	167	2015 2016 2017 2018
10	D'Juan Woods	163	2002 2003 2004 2005

Single season
Rank	Player	Rec	Year
1	Justin Blackmon	122	2011
2	Justin Blackmon	111	2010
3	Rashaun Woods	107	2002
4	Josh Stewart	101	2012
	Brennan Presley	101	2023
6	Brennan Presley	90	2024
7	Dez Bryant	87	2008
8	Tylan Wallace	86	2018
9	Hart Lee Dykes	84	1988
10	Rashaun Woods	80	2001
	Tay Martin	80	2021

Single game
Rank	Player	Rec	Year	Opponent
1	Alex Loyd	16	1949	Kansas
	Brennan Presley	16	2023	Texas A&M (Texas Bowl)
3	Brennan Presley	15	2023	Houston
	Brennan Presley	15	2024	Baylor
5	10 times by 6 players	13	Most recent: Josh Stewart, 2012 vs. Iowa State	

=== Receiving yards ===
Career
Rank	Player	Yards	Years
1	James Washington	4,472	2014 2015 2016 2017
2	Rashaun Woods	4,414	2000 2001 2002 2003
3	Justin Blackmon	3,564	2009 2010 2011
4	Hart Lee Dykes	3,510	1985 1986 1987 1988
5	Tylan Wallace	3,434	2017 2018 2019 2020
6	Brennan Presley	3,315	2020 2021 2022 2023 2024
7	D'Juan Woods	2,751	2002 2003 2004 2005 2006
8	Marcell Ateman	2,466	2013 2014 2015 2016 2017
9	Dez Bryant	2,425	2007 2008 2009
10	Dillon Stoner	2,378	2016 2017 2018 2019 2020

Single season
Rank	Player	Yards	Year
1	Justin Blackmon	1,782	2010
2	Rashaun Woods	1,695	2002
3	James Washington	1,549	2017
4	Justin Blackmon	1,522	2011
5	Tylan Wallace	1,491	2018
6	Dez Bryant	1,480	2008
7	Hart Lee Dykes	1,441	1988
8	James Washington	1,380	2016
9	Rashaun Woods	1,367	2003
10	Josh Stewart	1,210	2012

Single game
Rank	Player	Yards	Year	Opponent
1	Adarius Bowman	300	2006	Kansas
2	James Washington	296	2016	Pittsburgh
3	Dillon Stoner	247	2020	Baylor
4	Dez Bryant	236	2008	Houston
5	James Washington	235	2017	Baylor
6	Rashaun Woods	232	2003	SMU
7	Rashaun Woods	226	2002	Oklahoma
8	Rashaun Woods	223	2003	Ole Miss (Cotton Bowl)
9	Tylan Wallace	232	2018	Texas
10	Tylan Wallace	220	2018	Oklahoma

=== Receiving touchdowns ===
Career
Rank	Player	TDs	Years
1	Rashaun Woods	42	2000 2001 2002 2003
2	Justin Blackmon	40	2009 2010 2011
3	James Washington	39	2014 2015 2016 2017
4	Hart Lee Dykes	31	1985 1986 1987 1988
5	Dez Bryant	29	2007 2008 2009
6	Tylan Wallace	26	2017 2018 2019 2020
7	Brennan Presley	23	2020 2021 2022 2023 2024
8	D'Juan Woods	20	2002 2003 2004 2005 2006
	Adarius Bowman	20	2006 2007
10	Tracy Moore	18	2009 2010 2011 2012 2013

Single season
Rank	Player	TDs	Year
1	Justin Blackmon	20	2010
2	Dez Bryant	19	2008
3	Justin Blackmon	18	2011
4	Rashaun Woods	17	2002
5	Hart Lee Dykes	15	1988
	Rashaun Woods	15	2003
7	James Washington	13	2017
8	Adarius Bowman	12	2006
	Tylan Wallace	12	2018
10	Rashaun Woods	10	2001
	James Washington	10	2015
	James Washington	10	2016
	Tay Martin	10	2021

Single game
Rank	Player	TDs	Year	Opponent
1	Rashaun Woods	7	2003	SMU
2	Adarius Bowman	4	2006	Kansas
	Dez Bryant	4	2008	Iowa State
	Tracy Moore	4	2012	Arizona
4	Numerous times	3	Most recent: Tay Martin, 2021 vs. Notre Dame (Fiesta Bowl)	

== Total offense ==
Total offense is the sum of passing and rushing statistics. It does not include receiving or returns.

=== Total offense yards ===
Career
Rank	Player	Yards	Years
1	Mason Rudolph	13,646	2014 2015 2016 2017
2	Spencer Sanders	11,509	2019 2020 2021 2022
3	Zac Robinson	10,175	2006 2007 2008 2009
4	Brandon Weeden	9,110	2008 2009 2010 2011
5	Mike Gundy	8,272	1986 1987 1988 1989
6	Josh Fields	5,984	2001 2002 2003
7	Alan Bowman	5,869	2023 2024
8	Tony Lindsay	5,528	1997 1998 1999 2000
9	Tone' Jones	5,341	1993 1994 1995 1996
10	Thurman Thomas	5,034	1984 1985 1986 1987

Single season
Rank	Player	Yards	Year
1	Mason Rudolph	4,939	2017
2	Brandon Weeden	4,625	2011
3	Brandon Weeden	4,209	2010
4	Mason Rudolph	4,152	2016
5	Taylor Cornelius	4,002	2018
6	Mason Rudolph	3,735	2015
7	Zac Robinson	3,671	2007
8	Zac Robinson	3,626	2008
9	Spencer Sanders	3,507	2021
10	Alan Bowman	3,484	2023

Single game
Rank	Player	Yards	Year	Opponent
1	Mason Rudolph	522	2016	Pittsburgh
2	Brandon Weeden	502	2011	Kansas State
3	Taylor Cornelius	496	2018	Oklahoma
	Spencer Sanders	496	2021	Notre Dame (Fiesta Bowl)
5	Mason Rudolph	494	2017	Pittsburgh
6	Zac Robinson	486	2007	Texas
7	Mason Rudolph	483	2016	Kansas State
8	Brandon Weeden	476	2011	Iowa State
9	Mason Rudolph	470	2017	Baylor
10	Spencer Sanders	463	2022	Central Michigan

=== Touchdowns responsible for ===
"Touchdowns responsible for" is the NCAA's official term for combined passing and rushing touchdowns. Oklahoma State's 2021 media guide uses this specific term, and does not list official single-game leaders in this statistic.

Career
Rank	Player	TDs	Years
1	Mason Rudolph	109	2014 2015 2016 2017
2	Zac Robinson	88	2006 2007 2008 2009
3	Spencer Sanders	85	2019 2020 2021 2022
4	Brandon Weeden	76	2008 2009 2010 2011
5	Mike Gundy	66	1986 1987 1988 1989
6	J.W. Walsh	61	2012 2013 2014 2015
7	Josh Fields	58	2001 2002 2003
8	Barry Sanders	53	1986 1987 1988
9	Thurman Thomas	51	1984 1985 1986 1987
10	Terry Miller	49	1974 1975 1976 1977

Single season
Rank	Player	TDs	Year
1	Mason Rudolph	47	2017
2	Barry Sanders	42	1988
	Taylor Cornelius	42	2018
4	Brandon Weeden	38	2011
5	Josh Fields	34	2002
	Brandon Weeden	34	2010
	Mason Rudolph	34	2016
	**Drew Mestemaker**	34	2026
9	Zac Robinson	33	2008
10	Zac Robinson	32	2007

Single game
Rank	Player	TDs	Year	Opponent
1	Josh Fields	7	2003	SMU

== Defense ==
=== Interceptions ===
Career
Rank	Player	Ints	Years
1	Bob Fenimore	18	1943 1944 1945 1946
2	Mark Moore	16	1983 1984 1985 1986
	Melvin Gilliam	16	1985 1986 1987 1988
4	Gregg Johnson	13	1977 1978 1979 1980
5	John Gates	12	1968 1969
	Chris Rockins	12	1980 1981 1982 1983
	Rod Brown	12	1982 1983 1984
	Adam Hinds	12	1982 1983 1984
	Scott Harmon	12	1990 1991 1992 1993
	Justin Gilbert	12	2010 2011 2012 2013

Single season
Rank	Player	Ints	Year
1	John Gates	8	1969
	Alvin Brown	8	1972
	Adam Hinds	8	1983
4	Bob Fenimore	7	1945
	Ed Roof	7	1949
	Darryl Stewart	7	1972
	Mark Moore	7	1985
	Justin Gilbert	7	2013

Single game
Rank	Player	Ints	Year	Opponent
1	Lee Cook	5	1942	Detroit
2	Bob Fenimore	4	1944	Denver
3	Jacob Lacey	3	2007	Texas

=== Tackles ===
Career
Rank	Player	Tackles	Years
1	John Corker	496	1976 1977 1978 1979
2	Mike Green	485	1979 1980 1981 1982
3	Ricky Young	451	1978 1979 1980 1981
4	Malcolm Rodriguez	408	2017 2018 2019 2020 2021
5	Leslie O'Neal	393	1982 1983 1984 1985
6	Sim Drain	369	1986 1987 1988 1989
7	John Little	332	1967 1968 1969
8	Jordan Sterns	325	2013 2014 2015 2016
9	Phillip Dokes	320	1973 1974 1975 1976
	Andre Sexton	320	2006 2007 2008 2009

Single season
Rank	Player	Tackles	Year
1	Mike Green	183	1982
2	Matt Monger	175	1984
3	Barty Chappell	171	1970
4	Larry Gosney	157	1968
5	Ricky Young	146	1979
6	Nickolas Martin	140	2023
7	John Little	139	1968
8	Mike Green	138	1980
9	Matt Monger	136	1983
10	Leon Ward	135	1964

Single game
Rank	Player	Tackles	Year	Opponent
1	Gary Darnell	27	1969	Texas Tech
2	Keith Burns	23	1992	Colorado
3	Matt Monger	21	1984	Tulsa
	James Ham	21	1985	Colorado
5	Jim Krebs	20	1985	Colorado
	Leonard Jackson	20	1986	Tulsa
	Cornell Cannon	20	1989	Colorado
	Dwayne Levels	20	2001	Baylor
	Jordan Sterns	20	2014	West Virginia
10	5 times by 5 players	19	Most recent: Jordan Sterns, 2016 vs. Oklahoma	

=== Sacks ===
Career
Rank	Player	Sacks	Years
1	Leslie O'Neal	34.0	1982 1983 1984 1985
2	Jason Gildon	33.0	1990 1991 1992 1993
3	Rodney Harding	31.0	1981 1982 1983 1984
4	Emmanuel Ogbah	28.0	2013 2014 2015
5	Collin Oliver	23.5	2021 2022 2023 2024
6	Greg Richmond	21.5	2000 2001 2002 2003
7	Gary Lewis	21.0	1981 1982 1983 1984
8	Nathan Peterson	20.5	2004 2005 2006 2007
9	Kevin Williams	18.5	1999 2000 2001 2002
10	Victor DeGrate	17.0	2003 2004 2005 2006

Single season
Rank	Player	Sacks	Year
1	Leslie O'Neal	16.0	1984
2	Gary Lewis	14.0	1981
3	Emmanuel Ogbah	13.0	2015
4	Jason Gildon	12.5	1991
	Greg Richmond	12.5	2003
6	Leslie O'Neal	12.0	1983
7	Collin Oliver	11.5	2021
8	Emmanuel Ogbah	11.0	2014
9	Jordan Brailford	10.0	2018
10	Victor DeGrate	9.5	2006

Single game
Rank	Player	Sacks	Year	Opponent
1	Gary Lewis	4.0	1982	Colorado
2	Andrel Waddle	3.5	1998	SW Louisiana
3	16 times by 9 players	3.0	Most recent: Wendell Gregory, 2025 vs. UT Martin	

== Kicking ==
=== Field goals made ===
Career
Rank	Player	FGs	Years
1	Larry Roach	69	1981 1982 1983 1984
2	Ben Grogan	68	2013 2014 2015 2016
3	Matt Ammendola	60	2016 2017 2018 2019
4	Dan Bailey	57	2007 2008 2009 2010
5	Cary Blanchard	56	1987 1988 1989 1990
6	Tim Sydnes	54	1996 1997 1998 1999
7	Quinn Sharp	50	2009 2010 2011 2012
8	Alex Hale	43	2020 2021 2022 2023
9	Luke Phillips	42	2001 2002 2003
10	Lawson Vaughn	39	1992 1993 1994 1995
	Tanner Brown	39	2021 2022

Single season
Rank	Player	FGs	Year
1	Quinn Sharp	28	2012
2	Dan Bailey	27	2010
	Alex Hale	27	2023
4	Matt Ammendola	23	2017
5	Quinn Sharp	22	2011
	Ben Grogan	22	2014
	Tanner Brown	22	2022
8	Cary Blanchard	20	1989
	Matt Ammendola	20	2019
10	Larry Roach	19	1981
	Larry Roach	19	1983
	Ben Grogan	19	2016

Single game
Rank	Player	FGs	Year	Opponent
1	Larry Roach	5	1982	Missouri
	Quinn Sharp	5	2012	TCU
	Alex Hale	5	2023	Kansas State
	Sam Keltner	5	2026	Colorado
5	Numerous times	4	Most recent: Sam Keltner, 2026 vs. West Virginia	

=== Field goal percentage ===
Minimum of 15 career attempts and 10 single-season attempts.

Career
Rank	Player	FG%	Years
1	Tanner Brown	88.6%	2021 2022
2	Quinn Sharp	84.7%	2009 2010 2011 2012
3	Luke Phillips	82.4%	2001 2002 2003
4	Bruce Redden	80.0%	2005 2006
5	Alex Hale	79.6%	2020 2021 2022 2023
6	Dan Bailey	79.2%	2007 2008 2009 2010
7	Matt Ammendola	76.9%	2016 2017 2018 2019
8	Ben Grogan	74.7%	2013 2014 2015 2016
9	Logan Ward	73.0%	2022 2023 2024 2025
10	Cary Blanchard	72.7%	1987 1988 1989 1990

Single season
Rank	Player	FG%	Year
1	Tanner Brown	95.7%	2022
2	Alex Hale	92.9%	2020
3	Luke Phillips	88.9%	2003
4	Luke Phillips	88.2%	2001
5	Quinn Sharp	88.0%	2011
6	Dan Bailey	87.1%	2010
7	Cary Blanchard	86.7%	1988
8	Tim Sydnes	83.3%	1998
	Jason Ricks	83.3%	2006
	Matt Ammendola	83.3%	2019

== Scoring ==
=== Points ===
Career
Rank	Player	Points	Years
1	Ben Grogan	433	2013 2014 2015 2016
2	Dan Bailey	370	2007 2008 2009 2010
3	Barry Sanders	360	1986 1987 1988
4	Matt Ammendola	359	2016 2017 2018 2019
5	Cary Blanchard	331	1987 1988 1989 1990
6	Thurman Thomas	302	1984 1985 1986 1987
7	Quinn Sharp	301	2009 2010 2011 2012
8	Larry Roach	296	1981 1982 1983 1984
9	Terry Miller	294	1974 1975 1976 1977
10	Tim Sydnes	272	1996 1997 1998 1999

Single season
Rank	Player	Points	Year
1	Barry Sanders	264	1988
2	Terry Miller	162	1976
3	Joseph Randle	156	2011
	Quinn Sharp	156	2012
5	Dan Bailey	149	2010
6	Quinn Sharp	145	2011
7	Matt Ammendola	139	2017
8	Justin Blackmon	132	2010
	Ollie Gordon II	132	2023
10	Thurman Thomas	128	1987
	Dez Bryant	128	2008
	Chuba Hubbard	128	2019

Single game
Rank	Player	Points	Year	Opponent
1	Rashaun Woods	42	2003	SMU
2	Barry Sanders	30	1988	Tulsa
	Barry Sanders	30	1988	Kansas
	Barry Sanders	30	1988	Wyoming (Holiday Bowl)
	Ollie Gordon II	30	2023	BYU
6	Thurman Thomas	26	1987	Iowa State
7	Numerous times	24	Most recent: Caleb Hawkins, 2026 vs. Kansas State	

=== Touchdowns ===
In official NCAA statistics, touchdown totals include touchdowns scored. Accordingly, these lists include rushing, receiving, and return touchdowns, but not passing touchdowns.

Career
Rank	Player	TDs	Years
1	Barry Sanders	60	1986 1987 1988
2	Thurman Thomas	50	1984 1985 1986 1987
3	Terry Miller	49	1974 1975 1976 1977
4	Joseph Randle	43	2010 2011 2012
5	Rashaun Woods	42	2000 2001 2002 2003
	Justin Blackmon	42	2009 2010 2011
7	James Washington	40	2014 2015 2016 2017
	Ollie Gordon II	40	2022 2023 2024
9	Kendall Hunter	39	2007 2008 2009 2010
10	Chuba Hubbard	36	2018 2019 2020
	Tatum Bell	36	2000 2001 2002 2003

Single season
Rank	Player	TDs	Year
1	Barry Sanders	44	1988
2	Terry Miller	27	1976
3	Joseph Randle	26	2011
4	Justin Blackmon	22	2010
	Ollie Gordon II	22	2023
6	Thurman Thomas	21	1987
	Dez Bryant	21	2008
	Chuba Hubbard	21	2019
9	Justin Blackmon	18	2011
10	Thurman Thomas	17	1985
	Rashaun Woods	17	2002
	Kendall Hunter	17	2008

Single game
Rank	Player	TDs	Year	Opponent
1	Rashaun Woods	7	2003	SMU
2	Barry Sanders	5	1988	Tulsa
	Barry Sanders	5	1988	Kansas
	Barry Sanders	5	1988	Wyoming (Holiday Bowl)
	Ollie Gordon II	5	2023	BYU
6	too many to count	4	Most recent: Caleb Hawkins, 2026 vs. Kansas State	
