= 2020 Texas Longhorns football team =

American college football season

2020 Texas Longhorns football

Alamo Bowl champion

Alamo Bowl, W 55–23 vs. Colorado
- Conference: Big 12 Conference

Ranking
- Coaches: No. 20
- AP: No. 19
- Record: 7–3 (5–3 Big 12)
- Head coach: Tom Herman (4th season)
- Offensive coordinator: Mike Yurcich (1st season)
- Co-offensive coordinator: Herb Hand (3rd season)
- Offensive scheme: Spread
- Defensive coordinator: Chris Ash (1st season)
- Co-defensive coordinator: Coleman Hutzler (1st season)
- Base defense: 4–3
- Home stadium: Darrell K Royal–Texas Memorial Stadium

Uniform
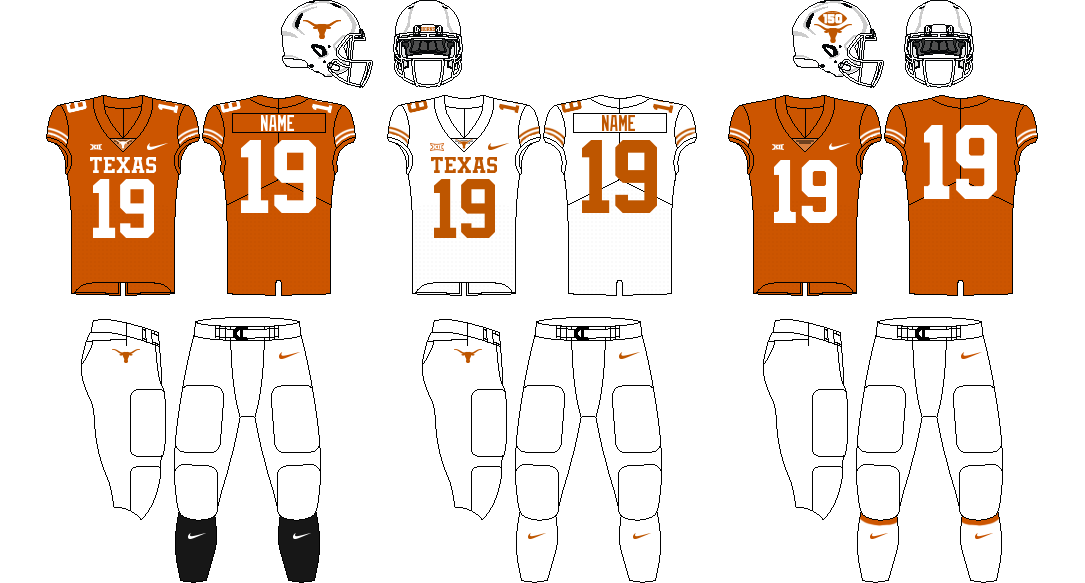

2020 Big 12 Conference football standings
	Conf.			Overall
Team	W		L	W		L
No. 9 Iowa State y	8	–	1	9	–	3
No. 6 Oklahoma y$	6	–	2	9	–	2
No. 20 Oklahoma State	6	–	3	8	–	3
No. 19 Texas	5	–	3	7	–	3
TCU	5	–	4	6	–	4
West Virginia	4	–	4	6	–	4
Kansas State	4	–	5	4	–	6
Texas Tech	3	–	6	4	–	6
Baylor	2	–	7	2	–	7
Kansas	0	–	8	0	–	9
Championship: Oklahoma 27, Iowa State 21
$ – Conference champion; y – Championship game participant; Rankings from AP Poll.

The 2020 Texas Longhorns football team represented the University of Texas at Austin during the 2020 NCAA Division I FBS football season. The Longhorns played their home games at Darrell K Royal–Texas Memorial Stadium in Austin, Texas. They are a charter member of the Big 12 Conference. They were led by fourth-year head coach Tom Herman.

The Longhorns finished their season with a 5–3 conference record in Big 12 play, and 7–3 overall, having had their final regular season game against Kansas cancelled due to COVID-19 protocols. They then went on to rout the 4–1 Colorado Buffaloes in a 32-point Alamo Bowl victory to finish as the No. 19 team in the nation.

However, despite this fourth-straight bowl win, Tom Herman was fired after four years as head coach. This followed a second consecutive season that fell short of expectations and included a narrow home loss to Iowa State that eliminated Texas from Big 12 championship contention in Week 13. Initial reports had linked former Florida and Ohio State head coach Urban Meyer to Herman's hot seat job in the months prior to his firing; yet, ultimately, the post went to Alabama offensive coordinator Steve Sarkisian, who was named head coach on January 2, 2021, just hours after Herman's dismissal. Pass rusher Joseph Ossai was also named a consensus All-American.

== Offseason ==
=== Coaching changes ===
After being demoted from his role as offensive coordinator, Tim Beck was hired by NC State as offensive coordinator. Additionally, both co-defensive coordinators, Todd Orlando and Craig Naivar, were fired, along with several other coaches. Orlando and Naivar were replaced by former Rutgers head coach Chris Ash and South Carolina linebackers coach Coleman Hutzler.

=== Position key ===
Back	B	Center	C	Cornerback	CB	Defensive back	DB		
Defensive end	DE	Defensive lineman	DL	Defensive tackle	DT	End	E		
Fullback	FB	Place Kicker	PK	Guard	G	Halfback	HB	Kicker	K
Kickoff returner	KR	Offensive tackle	OT	Offensive lineman	OL	Linebacker	LB		
Long snapper	LS	Split end	SE	Punter	P	Punt returner	PR	Quarterback	QB
Running back	RB	Safety	S	Tight end	TE	Wide receiver	WR		

=== Coaching staff departures ===
Name	Position	New Team	New Position
Tim Beck	Offensive coordinator	NC State	OC/QB
Todd Orlando	Defensive coordinator	USC	DC
Drew Mehringer	Wide receivers	FAU	Co-Offensive Coordinator/Tight Ends
Jason Washington	Run game coordinator / cornerbacks	Mississippi State	Safeties

== Players drafted into the NFL ==
Round	Pick	Player	Position	NFL team
2	51	Sam Cosmi	OT	Washington Football Team
3	69	Joseph Ossai	DE	Cincinnati Bengals
5	148	Ta'Quon Graham	DT	Atlanta Falcons
5	152	Caden Sterns	S	Denver Broncos
6	218	Sam Ehlinger	QB	Indianapolis Colts

== Preseason ==
=== Big 12 media days ===
The Big 12 media days were held on July 21–22, 2020 in a virtual format due to the COVID-19 pandemic.

=== Big 12 media poll ===
Big 12 media poll
Predicted finish	Team	Votes (1st place)
1	Oklahoma	80
2	Oklahoma State	6
3	Texas	4
4	Iowa State	
5	Baylor	
6	TCU	
7	Kansas State	
8	West Virginia	
9	Texas Tech	
10	Kansas	

== Schedule ==
=== Spring game ===
The Longhorns held spring practices in March and April 2020. The Texas football spring game took place in Austin, Texas on April 25, 2020.

=== Regular season ===
Texas released its 2020 schedule on October 22, 2019. The 2020 schedule consisted of 6 home games, 4 away games and 1 neutral-site game in the regular season. The Longhorns were scheduled to host 3 non-conference games, against South Florida, LSU, and UTEP. Texas was scheduled to host West Virginia, Baylor, TCU, and Iowa State, and Texas was scheduled to travel to Kansas State, Texas Tech, Kansas, and Oklahoma State in regular season conference play.

On August 12, 2020, the Longhorns' revised schedule was released. Previously scheduled games against South Florida on September 5 and LSU on September 12 were both canceled due to the COVID-19 pandemic.

On November 18, 2020, the Big 12 Conference announced that the Texas–Kansas game would be rescheduled from November 21 to December 12 because of Kansas' "inability to meet the minimum position requirements established by the Big 12 Conference." A team needs 53 players to play a game, and there are also minimum numbers of players for each position group. Due to the "ongoing surge in COVID-19 cases and hospitalizations across the region", Kansas suspended fan attendance at all home games from November 17 to November 30, although it did not make a decision whether the December 12 Texas–Kansas game would allow fan attendance.

==== Original ====
Date	Opponent	Site	Result
September 5	South Florida*	Darrell K Royal–Texas Memorial Stadium; Austin, TX	No Contest
September 12	at LSU*	Tiger Stadium; Baton Rouge, LA	No Contest
September 19	UTEP*	Darrell K Royal–Texas Memorial Stadium; Austin, TX	Rescheduled
October 3	at Kansas State	Bill Snyder Family Stadium; Manhattan, KS	Rescheduled
October 10	vs. Oklahoma	Cotton Bowl; Dallas, TX (Red River Showdown)	No Change
October 17	West Virginia	Darrell K Royal–Texas Memorial Stadium; Austin, TX	Rescheduled
October 24	at Texas Tech	Jones AT&T Stadium; Lubbock, TX (rivalry)	Rescheduled
October 31	Baylor	Darrell K Royal–Texas Memorial Stadium; Austin, TX (rivalry)	Rescheduled
November 7	at Kansas	David Booth Kansas Memorial Stadium; Lawrence, KS	Rescheduled
November 14	TCU	Darrell K Royal–Texas Memorial Stadium; Austin, TX (rivalry)	Rescheduled
November 21	Iowa State	Darrell K Royal–Texas Memorial Stadium; Austin, TX	Rescheduled
November 27	at Oklahoma State	Boone Pickens Stadium; Stillwater, OK	Rescheduled
*Non-conference game; Rankings from AP Poll and CFP Rankings after November 3 released prior to game

==== Revised ====
Date	Time	Opponent	Rank	Site	TV	Result	Attendance
September 12	7:00 p.m.	UTEP*	No. 14	Darrell K Royal–Texas Memorial Stadium; Austin, TX	LHN	W 59–3	15,337
September 26	2:30 p.m.	at Texas Tech	No. 8	Jones AT&T Stadium; Lubbock, TX (rivalry)	FOX	W 63–56 ^{OT}	16,615
October 3	11:00 a.m.	TCU	No. 9	Darrell K Royal–Texas Memorial Stadium; Austin, TX (rivalry)	FOX	L 31–33	17,753
October 10	11:00 a.m.	vs. Oklahoma	No. 22	Cotton Bowl; Dallas, TX (Red River Showdown)	FOX	L 45–53 ^{4OT}	24,000
October 24	2:30 p.m.	Baylor		Darrell K Royal–Texas Memorial Stadium; Austin, TX (rivalry)	ESPN	W 27–16	18,202
October 31	3:00 p.m.	at No. 6 Oklahoma State		Boone Pickens Stadium; Stillwater, OK	FOX	W 41–34 ^{OT}	14,672
November 7	11:00 a.m.	West Virginia	No. 21	Darrell K Royal–Texas Memorial Stadium; Austin, TX	ABC	W 17–13	17,843
November 27	11:00 a.m.	No. 13 Iowa State	No. 17	Darrell K Royal–Texas Memorial Stadium; Austin, TX	ABC	L 20–23	16,555
December 5	11:00 a.m.	at Kansas State		Bill Snyder Family Stadium; Manhattan, KS	FOX	W 69–31	9,851
December 29	8:00 p.m.	vs. Colorado*	No. 20	Alamodome; San Antonio, TX (Alamo Bowl)	ESPN	W 55–23	10,822
*Non-conference game; Rankings from AP Poll and CFP Rankings after November 24 released prior to game; All times are in Central time; Source: Texas Sports

1: Due to Kansas's inability to meet minimum position requirements due to COVID-19, the game was postponed from November 21 to December 12, and was then canceled on December 10 because of a rise of COVID-19 cases in both programs.

== Coaching staff ==
Coach	Title	Year at Texas	Previous job
Tom Herman	Head Coach	4th	Houston (HC)
Chris Ash	DC/S	1st	Rutgers (HC)
Coleman Hutzler	Co-DC/LB	1st	South Carolina (LB/ST)
Herb Hand	Co-OC/OL	3rd	Auburn (OL)
Mike Yurcich	OC/QB	1st	Ohio State (PGC/QB)
Jay Boulware	AHC ST/TE	1st	Oklahoma (RB/ST)
Andre Coleman	WR	2nd	Kansas State (OC/WR)
Stan Drayton	AHC/RGC/RB	4th	Chicago Bears (RB)
Oscar Giles	DL	4th	Houston (DL)
Jay Valai	CB	1st	Rutgers (CB)
Mark Hagen	AHC D/DL	1st	Indiana (Co-DC/DL)

== Game summaries ==
=== Vs. UTEP ===
UTEP Miners (1–0) vs. Texas Longhorns (0–0)

Quarter	1	2	3	4	Total
UTEP	0	3	0	0	3
#14 Texas	21	24	7	7	59

at Darrell K Royal–Texas Memorial Stadium • Austin, TX

- Date: Saturday, September 12, 2020
- Game time: 7:00 p.m. CDT
- Game weather: Partly Sunny, 88 °F (31 °C), Wind: ENE 4 mph (6.4 km/h)
- Game attendance: 15,337
- Referee: Kevin Hassell
- TV announcers (LHN): Lowell Galindo (play–by–play), Andre Ware (analyst) and Kris Budden (sideline)
- Box Score Recap

Game information

First Quarter

- (14:41) UT – Joshua Moore 78 yard pass from Sam Ehlinger (Dicker kick), UT 7–0; 1 play, 78 yards, 0:19
- (9:32) UT – Cade Brewer 20 yard pass from Sam Ehlinger (Dicker kick), UT 14–0; 10 plays, 67 yards, 3:24
- (4:57) UT – Roschon Johnson 1 yard run (Dicker kick), UT 21–0; 8 plays, 70 yards, 3:24

Second Quarter

- (14:10) UT – Brenden Schooler 40 yard pass from Sam Ehlinger (Dicker kick), UT 28–0; 4 plays, 76 yards, 0:50
- (12:15) UT – Tarik Black 5 yard pass from Sam Ehlinger (Dicker kick), UT 35–0; 3 plays, 42 yards, 1:02
- (6:16) UT – Cameron Dicker 32 yard field goal, UT 38–0; 11 plays, 54 yards, 3:07
- (1:39) UTEP – Gavin Baechle 47 yard field goal, UT 38–3; 11 plays, 46 yards, 4:37
- (0:06) UT – Kai Money 6 yard pass from Sam Ehlinger (Dicker kick), UT 45–3; 6 plays, 75 yards, 1:33

Third Quarter

- (2:11) UT – Brennan Eagles 35 yard pass from Casey Thompson (Dicker kick), UT 52–3; 4 plays, 68 yards, 1:14

Fourth Quarter

- (13:00) UT – Marc Washington 17 yard pass from Casey Thompson (Dicker kick), UT 59–3; 8 plays, 54 yards, 2:28

Statistics	UTEP	TEX
First downs	14	28
Total yards	233	689
Rushing: Att/Yds	33/43	33/208
Passing yards	190	481
Passing: Comp–Att–Int	19–39–1	29–41–0
Time of Possession	34:17	25:43

Team	Category	Player	Statistics
UTEP	Passing	Gavin Hardison	12–27, 141 yards, 1 INT
UTEP	Rushing	Deion Hankins	11 car, 34 yards
UTEP	Receiving	Justin Garrett	4 rec, 58 yards
Texas	Passing	Sam Ehlinger	25–33, 426 yards, 5 TDs
Texas	Rushing	Keaontay Ingram	9 car, 44 yards
Texas	Receiving	Joshua Moore	6 rec, 127 yards, 1 TD

=== At Texas Tech ===
Texas Longhorns (1–0) vs. Texas Tech Red Raiders (1–0)

Quarter	1	2	3	4	OT	Total
#8 Texas	17	14	7	18	7	63
Texas Tech	7	14	21	14	0	56

at Jones AT&T Stadium • Lubbock, TX

- Date: Saturday, September 26, 2020
- Game time: 2:30 p.m. CDT
- Game weather: Clear, 93 °F (34 °C), Wind: S 14 mph (23 km/h)
- Game attendance: 16,615
- Referee: Scott Campbell
- TV announcers (FOX): Tim Brando, Spencer Tillman
- Box Score Recap

Game information

First Quarter

- (9:11) UT – Sam Ehlinger 2 yard run (Dicker kick), UT 7–0; 13 plays, 75 yards, 5:49
- (7:00) TTU – KeSean Carter 13 yard pass from Alan Bowman (Wolff kick), Tied 7–7; 6 plays, 75 yards, 2:11
- (4:24) UT – Cameron Dicker 43 yard field goal, UT 10–7; 8 plays, 32 yards, 2:23
- (0:41) UT – Joshua Moore 31 yard pass from Sam Ehlinger (Dicker kick), UT 17–7; 7 plays, 70 yards, 3:09

Second Quarter

- (12:11) TTU – KeSean Carter 22 yard pass from Alan Bowman (Wolff kick), UT 17–14; 3 plays, 49 yards, 1:26
- (7:48) UT – Roschon Johnson 1 yard run (Dicker kick), UT 24–14; 9 plays, 51 yards, 4:13
- (4:44) TTU – Erik Ezukanma 19 yard pass from Alan Bowman (Wolff kick), UT 24–21; 11 plays, 75 yards, 3:04
- (1:08) UT – Brenden Schooler 3 yard pass from Sam Ehlinger (Dicker kick), UT 31–21; 4 plays, 19 yards, 1:27

Third Quarter

- (14:08) TTU – Xavier Martin 0 yard fumble recovery (Wolff kick), UT 31–28
- (12:21) UT – Jahdae Barron 2 yard blocked punt return (Dicker kick), UT 38–28
- (0:44) TTU – T. J. Vasher 29 yard pass from Alan Bowman (Wolff kick), UT 38–35; 7 plays, 67 yards, 2:53
- (0:00) TTU – SaRodorick Thompson 10 yard run (Wolff kick), TTU 42–38; 1 play, 10 yards, 0:04

Fourth Quarter

- (10:47) UT – Cameron Dicker 26 yard field goal, TTU 42–41; 12 plays, 64 yards, 4:13
- (6:12) TTU – T. J. Vasher 18 yard pass from Alan Bowman (Wolff kick), TTU 49–41; 6 plays, 56 yards, 2:13
- (3:13) TTU – SaRodorick Thompson 75 yard run (Wolff kick), TTU 56–41; 2 plays, 78 yards, 0:59
- (2:39) UT – Brennan Eagles 12 yard pass from Sam Ehlinger (Dicker kick), TTU 56–48; 4 plays, 59 yards, 0:34
- (0:40) UT – Joshua Moore 18 yard pass from Sam Ehlinger (Eagles pass from Ehlinger), Tied 56–56; 6 plays, 42 yards, 1:59

Overtime

- (15:00) UT – Joshua Moore 12 yard pass from Sam Ehlinger (Dicker kick), UT 63–56; 3 plays, 25 yards

Statistics	TEX	TTU
First downs	27	24
Total yards	476	441
Rushing: Att/Yds	48/214	24/110
Passing yards	262	331
Passing: Comp–Att–Int	27–41–1	31–52–3
Time of Possession	34:39	25:21

Team	Category	Player	Statistics
Texas	Passing	Sam Ehlinger	24–40, 262 yards, 5 TDs, 1 INT
Texas	Rushing	Keaontay Ingram	12 car, 89 yards
Texas	Receiving	Joshua Moore	5 rec, 73 yards, 3 TDs
Texas Tech	Passing	Alan Bowman	31–52, 325 yards, 5 TDs, 3 INTs
Texas Tech	Rushing	SaRodorick Thompson	19 car, 104 yards, 2 TDs
Texas Tech	Receiving	Erik Ezukanma	7 rec, 91 yards, 1 TD

=== Vs. TCU ===
TCU Horned Frogs (0–1) vs. Texas Longhorns (2–0)

Quarter	1	2	3	4	Total
TCU	7	13	3	10	33
#9 Texas	7	7	7	10	31

at Darrell K Royal–Texas Memorial Stadium • Austin, TX

- Date: Saturday, October 3, 2020
- Game time: 11:00 a.m. CDT
- Game weather: Sunny, 69 °F (21 °C), Wind: SE 3 mph (4.8 km/h)
- Game attendance: 17,753
- Referee: Brad Van Vark
- TV announcers (FOX): Gus Johnson, Joel Klatt
- Box Score Recap

Game information

First Quarter

- (4:01) TCU – Darwin Barlow 1 yard run (Kell kick), TCU 7–0; 11 plays, 67 yards, 4:08
- (0:21) UT – Jake Smith 5 yard pass from Sam Ehlinger (Dicker kick), Tied 7–7; 10 plays, 75 yards, 3:40

Second Quarter

- (14:22) TCU – Max Duggan 5 yard run (Kell kick), TCU 14–7; 4 plays, 75 yards, 0:59
- (13:01) UT – Brennan Eagles 45 yard pass from Sam Ehlinger (Dicker kick), Tied 14–14; 4 plays, 63 yards, 1:12
- (1:28) TCU – Griffin Kell 27 yard field goal, TCU 17–14; 15 plays, 70 yards, 6:03
- (0:55) TCU – Griffin Kell 32 yard field goal, TCU 20–14; 4 plays, 5 yards, 0:21

Third Quarter

- (12:11) TCU – Griffin Kell 49 yard field goal, TCU 23–14; 6 plays, 39 yards, 2:49
- (9:55) UT – Roschon Johnson 7 yard pass from Sam Ehlinger (Dicker kick), TCU 23–21; 8 plays, 87 yards, 2:16

Fourth Quarter

- (13:36) TCU – Griffin Kell 28 yard field goal, TCU 26–21; 11 plays, 83 yards, 4:39
- (9:56) UT – Malcolm Epps 7 yard pass from Sam Ehlinger (Ingram run), UT 29–26; 10 plays, 75 yards, 3:40
- (4:01) TCU – Max Duggan 26 yard run (Kell kick), TCU 33–29; 5 plays, 43 yards, 2:15
- (0:00) UT – Max Duggan 15 yard safety, TCU 33–31

Statistics	TCU	TEX
First downs	25	16
Total yards	458	388
Rushing: Att/Yds	51/227	24/152
Passing yards	231	236
Passing: Comp–Att–Int	20–30–0	17–36–1
Time of Possession	24:51	25:09

Team	Category	Player	Statistics
TCU	Passing	Max Duggan	20–30, 231 yards
TCU	Rushing	Max Duggan	17 car, 79 yards, 2 TDs
TCU	Receiving	Quentin Johnston	3 rec, 70 yards
Texas	Passing	Sam Ehlinger	17–36, 236 yards, 4 TDs, 1 INT
Texas	Rushing	Roschon Johnson	5 car, 63 yards
Texas	Receiving	Jared Wiley	2 rec, 63 yards

=== Vs. Oklahoma ===
Texas Longhorns (2–1) vs. Oklahoma Sooners (1–2)

Quarter	1	2	3	4	OT	2OT	3OT	4OT	Total
#22 Texas	0	17	0	14	7	7	0	0	45
Oklahoma	10	7	14	0	7	7	0	8	53

at Cotton Bowl • Dallas, TX

- Date: Saturday, October 10, 2020
- Game time: 11:00 a.m. CDT
- Game weather: Mostly Sunny, 75 °F (24 °C), Wind: SE 2 mph (3.2 km/h)
- Game attendance: 24,000
- Referee: Brandon Cruse
- TV announcers (FOX): Gus Johnson, Joel Klatt
- Box Score Recap

Game information

First Quarter

- (9:34) OU – Gabe Brkic 19 yard field goal, OU 3–0; 9 plays, 58 yards, 3:17
- (6:47) OU – Marvin Mims 30 yard pass from Spencer Rattler (Brkic kick), OU 10–0; 4 plays, 60 yards, 1:33

Second Quarter

- (13:40) UT – Cameron Dicker 34 yard field goal, OU 10–3; 4 plays, 1:20
- (11:44) UT – Sam Ehlinger 6 yard run (Dicker kick), Tied 10–10; 2 plays, 19 yards, 0:47
- (6:58) OU – Marcus Major 7 yard run (Brkic kick), OU 17–10; 5 plays, 5 yards, 2:07
- (4:14) UT – Sam Ehlinger 2 yard run (Dicker kick), Tied 17–17; 8 plays, 75 yards, 2:44

Third Quarter

- (11:40) OU – T.J. Pledger 2 yard run (Brkic kick), OU 24–17; 3 plays, 30 yards, 1:22
- (1:27) OU – T.J. Pledger 1 yard run (Brkic kick), OU 31–17; 17 plays, 87 yards, 8:07

Fourth Quarter

- (3:28) UT – Joshua Moore 9 yard pass from Sam Ehlinger (Dicker kick), OU 31–24; 4 plays, 50 yards, 1:10
- (0:14) UT – Keaontay Ingram 2 yard pass from Sam Ehlinger (Dicker kick), Tied 31–31; 8 plays, 84 yards, 1:38

Overtime

- (15:00) UT – Sam Ehlinger 3 yard run (Dicker kick), UT 38–31; 5 plays, 25 yards
- (0:00) OU – Austin Stogner 11 yard pass from Spencer Rattler (Brkic kick), Tied 38–38; 5 plays, 25 yards

2nd Overtime

- (15:00) OU – Spencer Rattler 1 yard run (Brkic kick), OU 45–38; 5 plays, 25 yards
- (0:00) UT – Sam Ehlinger 25 yard run (Dicker kick), Tied 45–45; 2 plays, 25 yards

4th Overtime

- (15:00) OU – Drake Stoops 25 yard pass from Spencer Rattler (Wease pass from Rattler), OU 53–45; 2 plays, 25 yards

Statistics	TEX	OU
First downs	27	30
Total yards	428	469
Rushing: Att/Yds	34/141	55/208
Passing yards	287	261
Passing: Comp–Att–Int	30–53–2	28–42–1
Time of Possession	23:56	36:04

Team	Category	Player	Statistics
Texas	Passing	Sam Ehlinger	30–53, 287 yards, 2 TDs, 2 INTs
Texas	Rushing	Sam Ehlinger	23 car, 112 yards
Texas	Receiving	Joshua Moore	8 rec, 83 yards
Oklahoma	Passing	Spencer Rattler	23–35, 209 yards, 3 TDs, 1 INT
Oklahoma	Rushing	T.J. Pledger	22 car, 131 yards
Oklahoma	Receiving	Austin Stogner	6 rec, 56 yards

=== Vs. Baylor ===
Baylor Bears (1–1) vs. Texas Longhorns (2–2)

Quarter	1	2	3	4	Total
Baylor	3	0	0	13	16
Texas	0	13	14	0	27

at Darrell K Royal–Texas Memorial Stadium • Austin, TX

- Date: Saturday, October 24, 2020
- Game time: 2:30 p.m. CDT
- Game weather: Cloudy, 62 °F (17 °C), Wind: 4 mph (6.4 km/h)
- Game attendance: 18,202
- Referee: Kevin Mar
- TV announcers (ESPN): Mark Jones, Dusty Dvoracek
- Box Score Recap

Game information

First Quarter

- (0:49) BU – John Mayers 22 yard field goal, BU 3–0; 12 plays, 67 yards, 5:35

Second Quarter

- (12:10) UT – Cameron Dicker 42 yard field goal, Tied 3–3; 11 plays, 52 yards, 3:39
- (6:15) UT – Cameron Dicker 23 yard field goal, UT 6–3; 9 plays, 75 yards, 3:54
- (1:53) UT – Joshua Moore 3 yard pass from Sam Ehlinger (Dicker kick), UT 13–3; 7 plays, 80 yards, 2:32

Third Quarter

- (10:25) UT – Sam Ehlinger 1 yard run (Dicker kick), UT 20–3; 12 plays, 75 yards, 4:35
- (0:20) UT – Sam Ehlinger 9 yard run (Dicker kick), UT 27–3; 6 plays, 75 yards, 3:21

Fourth Quarter

- (11:24) BU – John Lovett 3 yard pass from Charlie Brewer (Brewer pass failed), UT 27–9; 9 plays, 75 yards, 3:56
- (7:37) BU – Gavin Holmes 7 yard pass from Charlie Brewer (Mayers kick), UT 27–16; 5 plays, 25 yards, 2:14

Statistics	BAY	TEX
First downs	22	19
Total yards	316	429
Rushing: Att/Yds	21/64	47/159
Passing yards	252	270
Passing: Comp–Att–Int	31–44–0	15–23–1
Time of Possession	27:53	32:07

Team	Category	Player	Statistics
Baylor	Passing	Charlie Brewer	30–43, 256 yards, 2 TDs
Baylor	Rushing	John Lovett	4 car, 21 yards
Baylor	Receiving	R.J. Sneed	4 rec, 62 yards
Texas	Passing	Sam Ehlinger	15–23, 270 yards, 1 TD, 1 INT
Texas	Rushing	Keaontay Ingram	16 car, 57 yards
Texas	Receiving	Tarik Black	1 rec, 72 yards

For the first time since September 30, 1950, Texas wore White uniforms at home. These retro/throwback style uniforms were worn to commemorate the 50th anniversary of the 1970 National Championship Team.

=== At Oklahoma State ===
Texas Longhorns (3–2) vs. Oklahoma State Cowboys (4–0)

Quarter	1	2	3	4	OT	Total
#19 Texas	7	13	6	8	7	41
#6 Oklahoma State	14	10	7	3	0	34

at Boone Pickens Stadium • Stillwater, OK

- Date: Saturday, October 31, 2020
- Game time: 3:00 p.m. CDT
- Game weather: Sunny, 67 °F (19 °C), Wind: S 15 mph (24 km/h)
- Game attendance: 14,672
- Referee: David Alvarez
- TV announcers (FOX): Joe Davis (play-by-play), Mark Helfrich (analyst)
- Box Score Recap

Game information

First Quarter

- (10:23) OSU – Tylan Wallace 11 yard pass from Spencer Sanders (Hale kick), OSU 7–0; 7 plays, 86 yards, 1:51
- (8:31) UT – Keaontay Ingram 1 yard run (Dicker kick), Tied 7–7; 3 plays, 15 yards, 0:39
- (1:36) OSU – Landon Wolf 5 yard pass from Spencer Sanders (Hale kick), OSU 14–7; 5 plays, 62 yards, 2:07

Second Quarter

- (13:20) UT – Brennan Eagles 41 yard pass from Sam Ehlinger (Dicker kick), Tied 14–14; 7 plays, 75 yards, 3:16
- (10:56) UT – Cameron Dicker 20 yard field goal, UT 17–14; 4 plays, 5 yards, 1:12
- (8:15) OSU – Chuba Hubbard 5 yard pass from Spencer Sanders (Hale kick), OSU 21–17; 7 plays, 75 yards, 2:41
- (1:49) OSU – Alex Hale 31 yard field goal, OSU 24–17; 13 plays, 69 yards, 4:45
- (0:03) UT – Cameron Dicker 40 yard field goal, OSU 24–20; 3 plays, 0:21

Third Quarter

- (8:09) OSU – Tylan Wallace 9 yard pass from Spencer Sanders (Hale kick), OSU 31–20; 10 plays, 72 yards, 3:11
- (7:57) UT – D'Shawn Jamison 100 yard kickoff return (Dicker kick failed), OSU 31–26

Fourth Quarter

- (4:27) UT – Jake Smith 12 yard pass from Sam Ehlinger (Brewer pass from Ehlinger), UT 34–31; 15 plays, 59 yards, 7:48
- (0:05) OSU – Alex Hale 34 yard field goal, Tied 34–34; 7 plays, 63 yards, 1:08

Overtime

- (15:00) UT – Joshua Moore 15 yard pass from Sam Ehlinger (Dicker kick), UT 41–34; 4 plays, 25 yards

Statistics	TEX	OSU
First downs	17	32
Total yards	287	530
Rushing: Att/Yds	40/118	51/130
Passing yards	169	400
Passing: Comp–Att–Int	18–35–0	27–40–1
Time of Possession	30:21	29:39

Team	Category	Player	Statistics
Texas	Passing	Sam Ehlinger	18–34, 169 yards, 3 TDs
Texas	Rushing	Bijan Robinson	13 car, 59 yards
Texas	Receiving	Jake Smith	7 rec, 70 yards, 1 TD
Oklahoma State	Passing	Spencer Sanders	27–39, 400 yards, 4 TDs, 1 INT
Oklahoma State	Rushing	Chuba Hubbard	25 car, 72 yards
Oklahoma State	Receiving	Tylan Wallace	11 rec, 187 yards, 2 TDs

This was Texas' first road win over a Top 10 opponent since beating #5 Nebraska 20–13 in Lincoln on October 16, 2010.

=== Vs. West Virginia ===
West Virginia Mountaineers (4–2) vs. Texas Longhorns (4–2)

Quarter	1	2	3	4	Total
West Virginia	7	0	6	0	13
#22 Texas	7	3	7	0	17

at Darrell K Royal–Texas Memorial Stadium • Austin, TX

- Date: Saturday, November 7, 2020
- Game time: 11:00 a.m. CST
- Game weather: Mostly Sunny, 70 °F (21 °C), Wind: 0 mph (0 km/h)
- Game attendance: 17,843
- Referee: Kevin Hassell
- TV announcers (ABC): Joe Tessitore, Greg McElroy, Holly Rowe
- Box Score Recap

Game information

First Quarter

- (12:35) UT – Brennan Eagles 7 yard pass from Sam Ehlinger (Dicker kick), UT 7–0; 7 plays, 75 yards, 2:25
- (8:58) WVU – Leddie Brown 12 yard run (Legg kick), Tied 7–7; 9 plays, 75 yards, 3:37

Second Quarter

- (14:55) UT – Cameron Dicker 34 yard field goal, UT 10–7; 10 plays, 74 yards, 2:24

Third Quarter

- (10:11) WVU – Casey Legg 25 yard field goal, Tied 10–10; 11 plays, 66 yards, 4:49
- (7:31) UT – Jake Smith 33 yard pass from Sam Ehlinger (Dicker kick), UT 17–10; 7 plays, 65 yards, 2:40
- (0:22) WVU – Casey Legg 34 yard field goal, UT 17–13; 9 plays, 31 yards, 4:20

Statistics	WVU	TEX
First downs	21	17
Total yards	360	363
Rushing: Att/Yds	26/43	36/9
Passing yards	317	184
Passing: Comp–Att–Int	35–50–0	15–31–0
Time of Possession	34:21	25:39

Team	Category	Player	Statistics
West Virginia	Passing	Jarret Doege	35–50, 317 yards
West Virginia	Rushing	Leddie Brown	15 car, 47 yards, 1 TD
West Virginia	Receiving	T.J. Simmons	4 rec, 71 yards
Texas	Passing	Sam Ehlinger	15–31, 184 yards, 2 TDs
Texas	Rushing	Bijan Robinson	12 car, 113 yards
Texas	Receiving	Jake Smith	3 rec, 59 yards, 1 TD

=== Vs. Iowa State ===
Iowa State Cyclones (6–2) vs. Texas Longhorns (5–2)

Quarter	1	2	3	4	Total
#15 Iowa State	7	3	3	10	23
#20 Texas	13	0	7	0	20

at Darrell K Royal–Texas Memorial Stadium • Austin, TX

- Date: Friday, November 27, 2020
- Game time: 11:00 a.m. CST
- Game weather: Rainy, 69 °F (21 °C)
- Game attendance: 16,555
- Referee: David Alvarez
- TV announcers (ABC): Matt Barrie, Mike Golic, Jr.
- Box Score Recap

Game information

First Quarter

- (11:29) UT – Cameron Dicker 21 yard field goal, UT 3–0; 8 plays, 72 yards, 3:31
- (7:39) UT – Sam Ehlinger 17 yard run (Dicker kick), UT 10–0; 6 plays, 63 yards, 2:19
- (4:45) ISU – Sean Shaw 35 yard pass from Brock Purdy (Assalley kick), UT 10–7; 6 plays, 75 yards, 2:54
- (0:21) UT – Cameron Dicker 42 yard field goal, UT 13–7; 6 plays, 32 yards, 1:51

Second Quarter

- (7:21) ISU – Connor Assalley 26 yard field goal, UT 13–10; 15 plays, 67 yards, 8:00

Third Quarter

- (7:30) UT – Jared Wiley 7 yard pass from Sam Ehlinger (Dicker kick), UT 20–10; 8 plays, 89 yards, 3:46
- (2:54) ISU – Connor Assalley 29 yard field goal, UT 20–13; 9 plays, 63 yards, 4:36

Fourth Quarter

- (14:48) ISU – Connor Assalley 38 yard field goal, UT 20–16; 5 plays, 37 yards, 1:49
- (1:25) ISU – Breece Hall 3 yard run (Assalley kick), ISU 23–20; 5 plays, 69 yards, 1:44

Statistics	ISU	TEX
First downs	25	21
Total yards	433	448
Rushing: Att/Yds	33/121	35/145
Passing yards	312	303
Passing: Comp–Att–Int	25–36–0	18–30–0
Time of Possession	32:57	27:03

Team	Category	Player	Statistics
Iowa State	Passing	Brock Purdy	26–36, 312 yards, 1 TD
Iowa State	Rushing	Breece Hall	20 car, 91 yards, 1 TD
Iowa State	Receiving	Charlie Kolar	6 rec, 131 yards
Texas	Passing	Sam Ehlinger	17–29, 298 yards, 1 TD
Texas	Rushing	Sam Ehlinger	15 car, 65 yards, 1 TD
Texas	Receiving	Brennan Eagles	5 rec, 142 yards

=== At Kansas State ===
Texas Longhorns (5–3) vs. Kansas State Wildcats (4–5)

Quarter	1	2	3	4	Total
Texas	17	14	35	3	69
Kansas State	7	10	14	0	31

at Bill Snyder Family Stadium • Manhattan, KS

- Date: Saturday, December 5, 2020
- Game time: 11:00 a.m. CST
- Game weather: Sunny, 43 °F (6 °C), Wind: N 9 mph (14 km/h)
- Game attendance: 9,851
- Referee: M Vandervelde
- TV announcers (FOX): Gus Johnson, Joel Klatt
- Box Score Recap

Game information

First Quarter

- (10:34) UT – Bijan Robinson 12 yard run (Dicker kick), UT 7–0; 7 plays, 81 yards, 2:33
- (4:38) UT – Cameron Dicker 28 yard field goal, UT 10–0; 9 plays, 54 yards, 3:20
- (4:19) UT – Roschon Johnson 3 yard run (Dicker kick), UT 17–0; 1 play, 3 yards, 0:04
- (0:54) KSU – Deuce Vaughn 19 yard run (Lynch kick), UT 17–7; 8 plays, 64 yards, 3:19

Second Quarter

- (14:53) UT – Bijan Robinson 30 yard run (Dicker kick), UT 24–7; 4 plays, 59 yards, 0:52
- (11:40) KSU – Blake Lynch 47 yard field goal, UT 24–10; 7 plays, 46 yards, 3:13
- (8:17) UT – Roschon Johnson 7 yard run (Dicker kick), UT 31–10; 8 plays, 70 yards, 3:17
- (1:20) KSU – Deuce Vaughn 4 yard run (Lynch kick), UT 31–17; 12 plays, 80 yards, 5:10

Third Quarter

- (14:44) UT – Bijan Robinson 75 yard run (Dicker kick), UT 38–17; 2 plays, 75 yards, 0:16
- (11:24) KSU – Malik Knowles 7 yard pass from Will Howard (Lynch kick), UT 38–24; 8 plays, 76 yards, 3:14
- (11:01) UT – Roschon Johnson 1 yard run (Dicker kick), UT 45–24; 1 play, 1 yard, 0:00
- (9:13) KSU – Malik Knowles 29 yard pass from Will Howard (Lynch kick), UT 45–31; 4 plays, 75 yards, 1:48
- (7:01) UT – Jordan Whittington 15 yard run (Dicker kick), UT 52–31; 6 plays, 75 yards, 2:12
- (2:18) UT – Cade Brewer 15 yard pass from Sam Ehlinger (Dicker kick), UT 59–31; 8 plays, 86 yards, 2:53
- (1:06) UT – Malcolm Epps 32 yard pass from Sam Ehlinger (Dicker kick), UT 66–31; 1 play, 32 yards, 0:07

Fourth Quarter

- (7:48) UT – Cameron Dicker 21 yard field goal, UT 69–31; 6 plays, 63 yards, 3:22

Statistics	TEX	KSU
First downs	26	24
Total yards	608	448
Rushing: Att/Yds	33/334	46/274
Passing yards	274	174
Passing: Comp–Att–Int	20–27–0	16–27–2
Time of Possession	24:20	35:40

Team	Category	Player	Statistics
Texas	Passing	Sam Ehlinger	20–27, 274 yards, 2 TDs
Texas	Rushing	Bijan Robinson	9 car, 172 yards, 3 TDs
Texas	Receiving	Jake Smith	4 rec, 55 yards
Kansas State	Passing	Will Howard	16–27, 174 yards, 2 TDs, 2 INTs
Kansas State	Rushing	Deuce Vaughn	10 car, 125 yards, 2 TDs
Kansas State	Receiving	Malik Knowles	6 rec, 95 yards, 2 TDs

=== At Kansas ===
Due to Kansas's inability to meet minimum position requirements due to COVID-19, the game was postponed from November 21 to December 12, and was then canceled on December 10 because of a rise of COVID-19 cases in both programs.

=== Vs. Colorado (Alamo Bowl) ===
Alamo Bowl: Texas Longhorns (6–3) vs. Colorado Buffaloes (4–1)

Quarter	1	2	3	4	Total
#20 Texas	14	3	17	21	55
Colorado	0	10	6	7	23

at Alamodome • San Antonio, TX

- Date: Tuesday, December 29, 2020
- Game time: 8:00 p.m. CDT
- Game weather: Indoors, 74 °F (23 °C)
- Game attendance: 10,822
- Referee: Marc Curles
- TV announcers (ESPN): Dave Pasch, Mike Golic, Sr., Kris Budden
- Box Score Recap

Game information

First Quarter

- (12:51) UT – Bijan Robinson 8 yard run (Dicker kick), UT 7–0; 4 plays, 74 yards, 0:50
- (5:28) UT – Bijan Robinson 14 yard pass from Sam Ehlinger (Dicker kick), UT 14–0; 6 plays, 89 yards, 2:37

Second Quarter

- (6:58) CO – Jarek Broussard 2 yard run (Price kick), UT 14–7; 10 plays, 50 yards, 5:11
- (2:07) UT – Cameron Dicker 53 yard field goal, UT 17–7; 6 plays, 58 yards, 1:57
- (0:43) CO – Evan Price 40 yard field goal, UT 17–10; 8 plays, 53 yards, 1:24

Third Quarter

- (14:23) UT – Joshua Moore 13 yard pass from Casey Thompson (Dicker kick), UT 24–10; 2 plays, 79 yards, 0:37
- (8:00) UT – Joshua Moore 25 yard pass from Casey Thompson (Dicker kick), UT 31–10; 5 plays, 80 yards, 2:10
- (3:33) UT – Cameron Dicker 35 yard field goal, UT 34–10; 7 plays, 43 yards, 3:19
- (1:46) CO – Jarek Broussard 3 yard run (Lewis pass failed), UT 34–16; 5 plays, 75 yards, 1:47

Fourth Quarter

- (14:42) UT – Bijan Robinson 23 yard pass from Casey Thompson (Dicker kick), UT 41–16; 5 plays, 75 yards, 2:04
- (11:48) CO – Brendon Lewis 2 yard run (Price kick), UT 41–23; 7 plays, 75 yards, 2:54
- (11:01) UT – Kelvontay Dixon 73 yard pass from Casey Thompson (Dicker kick), UT 48–23; 2 plays, 75 yards, 0:47
- (7:40) UT – Roschon Johnson 21 yard run (Dicker kick), UT 55–23; 1 play, 21 yards, 0:15

Statistics	TEX	CO
First downs	26	20
Total yards	638	378
Rushing: Att/Yds	40/303	46/182
Passing yards	335	196
Passing: Comp–Att–Int	19–28–0	14–33–2
Time of Possession	29:02	30:58

Team	Category	Player	Statistics
Texas	Passing	Casey Thompson	8–10, 170 yards, 4 TDs
Texas	Rushing	Bijan Robinson	10 car, 183 yards, 1 TD
Texas	Receiving	Joshua Moore	5 rec, 86 yards, 2 TDs
Colorado	Passing	Sam Noyer	8–23, 101 yards, 2 INTs
Colorado	Rushing	Jarek Broussard	27 car, 82 yards, 2 TDs
Colorado	Receiving	Dimitri Stanley	4 rec, 86 yards

== Rankings ==
Ranking movements Legend: ██ Increase in ranking ██ Decrease in ranking — = Not ranked RV = Received votes т = Tied with team above or below
	Week																	
Poll	Pre	1	2	3	4	5	6	7	8	9	10	11	12	13	14	15	16	Final
AP	14	14*	9	8 T	9	22	—	—	—	22	21	22	20	RV	23	21	20	19
Coaches	14	14*	8	9	9	22	—	—	—	RV	24	23	21	RV	23	24	24	20
CFP	Not released												17	—	20	20	20	Not released
