= 2020 Oklahoma State Cowboys football team =

American college football season

2020 Oklahoma State Cowboys football

Cheez-It Bowl champion

Cheez-It Bowl, W 37–34 vs. Miami (FL)
- Conference: Big 12 Conference

Ranking
- Coaches: No. 19
- AP: No. 20
- Record: 8–3 (6–3 Big 12)
- Head coach: Mike Gundy (16th season)
- Offensive coordinator: Kasey Dunn (1st season)
- Offensive scheme: Spread option
- Defensive coordinator: Jim Knowles (3rd season)
- Base defense: 4–2–5
- Home stadium: Boone Pickens Stadium

2020 Big 12 Conference football standings
	Conf.			Overall
Team	W		L	W		L
No. 9 Iowa State y	8	–	1	9	–	3
No. 6 Oklahoma y$	6	–	2	9	–	2
No. 20 Oklahoma State	6	–	3	8	–	3
No. 19 Texas	5	–	3	7	–	3
TCU	5	–	4	6	–	4
West Virginia	4	–	4	6	–	4
Kansas State	4	–	5	4	–	6
Texas Tech	3	–	6	4	–	6
Baylor	2	–	7	2	–	7
Kansas	0	–	8	0	–	9
Championship: Oklahoma 27, Iowa State 21
$ – Conference champion; y – Championship game participant; Rankings from AP Poll.

The 2020 OSU Cowboys football team represented Oklahoma State University in the 2020 NCAA Division I FBS football season. The Cowboys played their home games at Boone Pickens Stadium in Stillwater, Oklahoma, and competed in the Big 12 Conference. They were led by 16th-year head coach Mike Gundy.

== Offseason ==
=== Coaching changes ===
In January 2019, head coach Mike Gundy announced the hiring of Kasey Dunn to be the new offensive coordinator, replacing Sean Gleeson, who left to take an assistant coaching position at Rutgers. Dunn was promoted from his position as the Cowboys' wide receivers coach. Additionally, former Washington Redskins coach Tim Rattay was hired to take over Gleeson's role as quarterbacks coach.

== Preseason ==
=== Big 12 media days ===
The Big 12 media days were held on July 21–22, 2020 in a virtual format due to the COVID-19 pandemic.

=== Big 12 media poll ===
Big 12 media poll
Predicted finish	Team	Votes (1st place)
1	Oklahoma	80
2	Oklahoma State	6
3	Texas	4
4	Iowa State	
5	Baylor	
6	TCU	
7	Kansas State	
8	West Virginia	
9	Texas Tech	
10	Kansas	

== Schedule ==
=== Regular season ===
Oklahoma State released its 2020 schedule on October 22, 2019. The 2020 schedule consists of 7 home games and 5 away games in the regular season. The Cowboys will host 3 non-conference games against Oregon State, Tulsa, and Western Illinois. Oklahoma State will host Iowa State, Texas Tech, West Virginia, and Texas and travel to TCU, Kansas, Oklahoma, Baylor, and Kansas State in regular season conference play.

The Cowboys' scheduled games against Oregon State and Western Illinois were canceled before the start of the 2020 season due to the COVID-19 pandemic.

Date	Time	Opponent	Rank	Site	TV	Result	Attendance
September 19	11:00 a.m.	Tulsa*	No. 11	Boone Pickens Stadium; Stillwater, OK (rivalry)	ESPN	W 16–7	14,668
September 26	2:30 p.m.	West Virginia	No. 15	Boone Pickens Stadium; Stillwater, OK	ABC	W 27–13	14,672
October 3	2:30 p.m.	at Kansas	No. 17	David Booth Kansas Memorial Stadium; Lawrence, KS	ESPN	W 47–7	9,480
October 24	2:30 p.m.	No. 17 Iowa State	No. 6	Boone Pickens Stadium; Stillwater, OK	FOX	W 24–21	14,671
October 31	3:00 p.m.	Texas	No. 6	Boone Pickens Stadium; Stillwater, OK	FOX	L 34–41 ^{OT}	14,672
November 7	3:00 p.m.	at Kansas State	No. 14	Bill Snyder Family Stadium; Manhattan, KS	FOX	W 20–18	11,980
November 21	6:30 p.m.	at No. 18 Oklahoma	No. 14	Gaylord Family Oklahoma Memorial Stadium; Norman, OK (rivalry/College GameDay)	ABC	L 13–41	22,700
November 28	11:00 a.m.	Texas Tech	No. 23	Boone Pickens Stadium; Stillwater, OK	FOX	W 50–44	14,670
December 5	11:00 a.m.	at TCU	No. 15	Amon G. Carter Stadium; Fort Worth, TX	ESPN2	L 22–29	12,594
December 12	6:00 p.m.	at Baylor	No. 22	McLane Stadium; Waco, TX	ESPNU	W 42–3	11,667
December 29	4:30 p.m.	vs. No. 18 Miami (FL)*	No. 21	Camping World Stadium; Orlando, FL (Cheez-It Bowl)	ESPN	W 37–34	0
*Non-conference game; Rankings from AP Poll and CFP Rankings (after November 24) released prior to game; All times are in Central time

Schedule source:

== Roster ==
2020 Oklahoma State Cowboys football team roster
Players
Coaches
Offense

Pos.	#	Name	Class
RB	0	LD Brown	Sr
WR	1	Landon Wolf	Sr
WR	2	Tylan Wallace	Sr
QB	3	Spencer Sanders	So
WR	4	Tay Martin	Sr
WR	5	Zach Middleton	Fr
QB	6	Ethan Bullock	Jr
WR	8	Braydon Johnson	Jr
WR	9	Matt Polk	Fr
WR	10	Rashod Owens	Fr
WR	11	Dee Anderson	Sr
QB	13	Nolan McLean	Fr
QB	14	Peyton Thompson	Fr
WR	15	Jonathan Shepherd	So
QB	16	Shane Illingworth	Fr
WR	17	Dillon Stoner	Sr
QB	18	Shaun Taylor	So
RB	20	Dominic Richardson	Fr
RB	22	Mbari Snoddy	So
RB	23	Darius Salters	Jr
RB	24	Tavien Woodworth	Fr
RB	25	Andre Washington	Fr
RB	26	Micah Cooper	Sr
RB	27	Dezmon Jackson	Jr
RB	30	Chuba Hubbard	Jr
WR	30	Gabe Simpson	So
WR	32	Clayton Barbour	Fr
RB	33	Deondrick Glass	Fr
WR	37	Cale Cabbiness	Fr
WR	38	Jacob Morris	So
TE	40	Colby Blatnik	Fr
TE	41	Valek Cisneros	Fr
TE	48	Price Daube	Fr
OL	50	Ry Schneider	Sr
OL	51	Rody Schneider	Fr
OL	52	Nathan Engles	Jr
OL	54	Jake Henry	Fr
OL	57	Walker Reed	Sr
OL	58	Leyton Ernst	Fr
OL	59	Trent Pullen	Fr
OL	60	Tyrese Williams	So
OL	61	Jake Springfield	Fr
OL	62	Cade Bennett	Fr
OL	64	Chandler Anthony	Sr
OL	65	Matt McClurg	Jr
OL	66	Joe Michalski	Fr
OL	67	Cole Birmingham	Fr
OL	68	Taylor Miterko	Fr
OL	70	Hunter Woodard	So
OL	71	Monroe Mills	Fr
OL	72	Josh Sills	Sr
OL	73	Teven Jenkins	Sr
OL	74	Preston Wilson	Fr
OL	75	Eli Russ	Fr
OL	77	Hunter Anthony	So
OL	79	Matt Kegel	Sr
WR	80	Brennan Presley	Fr
WR	81	C. J. Tate	Jr
TE	82	Quinton Stewart	Fr
WR	83	Cade Cavender	Fr
TE	84	Dayton Metcalf	Sr
WR	86	Cale Mulsom	Jr
TE	87	Logan Carter	Sr
WR	88	Langston Anderson	Fr
TE	89	Jelani Woods	Jr
TE	90	Braden Cassity	So

Defense

Pos.	#	Name	Class
CB	0	Christian Holmes	Sr
LB	1	Calvin Bundage	Sr
S	2	Tanner McCalister	Jr
S	3	Tre Sterling	Jr
CB	4	Korie Black	Fr
CB	6	Jabbar Muhammad	Fr
LB	7	Amen Ogbongbemiga	Sr
CB	8	Rodarius Williams	Sr
LB	11	Lamont Bishop	Jr
S	12	Kanion Williams	So
CB	13	Thomas Harper	So
S	14	Nick Session	Fr
S	15	Ty Williams	Fr
LB	16	Devin Harper	Sr
S	18	Sean Michael Flanagan	So
S	19	Jalen Shells	Fr
LB	20	Malcolm Rodriguez	Sr
CB	22	DeMarco Jones	Fr
S	23	Gabe Lemons	So
CB	24	Jarrick Bernard-Converse	Jr
S	25	Jason Taylor II	So
CB	26	Jordan Reagan	Fr
CB	27	Anthony Jimmerson	Fr
S	28	Walker Roberts	Fr
CB	29	Cole Stanley	Fr
S	31	Kolby Harvell-Peel	Jr
CB	32	DeSean Buckner	Fr
LB	33	Cole Thompson	Fr
DT	35	Samuela Tuihalamaka	So
LB	36	Na'Drian Dizadare	Fr
DE	37	Isreal Isuman-Hundley	Fr
LB	38	Mason Cobb	Fr
CB	39	Trevor Ailey	Fr
DE	40	Brock Martin	Jr
LB	41	Constantino Borrelli	Fr
DT	42	Jayden Jernigan	So
LB	44	Kamryn Farrar	Fr
LB	45	Jeff Roberson	Fr
DE	46	Jake Schultz	Fr
LB	47	Carson Kropp	So
LB	48	Adam Martin	Jr
CB	49	Aeneas Favors	Fr
LB	50	Relijah Sherman	Jr
LB	51	Bo Hardy	Fr
DE	52	Ben Kopenski	So
DT	53	Grant Mahon	Fr
DT	54	Marcus Duckworth	Fr
DT	56	Xavier Ross	Fr
DE	57	Ryan Baker	Fr
DT	63	Dylon Carnagey	So
DT	70	Kevin Mair	So
DT	79	Austyn Cohrs	Fr
DE	82	Vance Mullendore	Fr
DE	83	Gordie Geymuller	Fr
DE	89	Tyler Lacy	So
DE	91	Tyren Irby	Jr
DT	92	Cameron Murray	Sr
DT	93	Colin Clay	So
DE	94	Trace Ford	So
DT	95	Israel Antwine	Jr
DE	96	Koby Walterscheid	Fr
DT	97	Amadou Fofana	Sr
DT	98	Brendon Evers	Jr
DT	99	Sione Asi	Jr

Special teams

Pos.	#	Name	Class
K	19	Alex Hale	So
P	29	Tom Hutton	So
K	39	Jake McClure	Jr
LS	53	Matt Hembrough	Jr
K	59	Brady Pohl	Fr
LS	63	Braedy Wilson	Fr
P	69	Ben Freehill	Fr
LS	71	Zeke Zaragoza	Jr

Head coach

- Mike Gundy

Coordinators/assistant coaches

- Kasey Dunn – Associate head coach/offensive coordinator/wide receivers
- Jim Knowles – Defensive coordinator/linebackers
- Joe Bob Clements – Defensive line
- Charlie Dickey – Offensive line
- Tim Rattay – Quarterbacks
- John Wozniak – Running backs
- Tim Duffie – Cornerbacks
- Jason McEndoo – Tight ends/Cowboy Backs
- Dan Hammerschmidt – Safeties
- Greg Richmond – Defensive line
- Rob Glass – Strength and conditioning
- Bradley Thomas – Offensive analyst
- Bill Clay – Defensive analyst
- Gary Gibbs – Defensive analyst
- Chris Thurmond – Defensive analyst
- M. K. Taylor – Special teams analyst
- Mack Butler – Director, football operations
- Rod Johnson – Assistant director of football operations
- Todd Bradford – Director, football recruiting
- Mariah Turner – Director, on-campus recruiting
- Beni Tonga – Player development specialist
- Eddie Simpkins – Administrative assistant
- Lorenzo Joe – Offensive quality control
- Koy McFarland – Defensive quality control
- Josh Gonzales – Prospect Analyst
- Victor Irokanski – Prospect Analyst
- Robert Luce – Prospect Analyst
- Joe Reynolds – Prospect Analyst
- Ryan Simmons – Prospect Analyst
- Shane Eachus – Graduate assistant
- Chris Meyers – Graduate assistant

Legend

- (C) Team captain
- (S) Suspended
- (I) Ineligible
- Injured
- Redshirt

Roster
Last update: 10/16/22

== Game summaries ==
=== vs Tulsa ===
Tulsa Golden Hurricane (0–0) vs No. 11 Oklahoma State Cowboys (0–0)

Quarter	1	2	3	4	Total
Golden Hurricane	0	7	0	0	7
No. 11 Cowboys	3	0	0	13	16

at Boone Pickens Stadium • Stillwater, OK

- Date: Saturday, September 19, 2020
- Game time: 11:00 a.m.CDT
- Game weather: •Sunny Temperature: 65
- Game attendance: 14,668
- Referee: Adam Savoie
- TV announcers (ESPN): Sean McDonough (play-by-play), Todd Blackledge (analyst), Todd McShay (sideline), Kris Budden (sideline)

Game information

First Quarter

- (5:13) OKST – Alex Hale 27-yard field goal (Drive: 17 plays, 76 yards, 6:36; Oklahoma State 3–0)

Second Quarter

- (1:38) TLSA – Josh Johnson 16-yard pass from Zach Smith, Tyler Tipton kick (Drive: 3 plays, 56 yards, 0:56; Tulsa 7–3)

Third Quarter

None

Fourth Quarter

- (14:56) OKST – Chuba Hubbard 3-yard run, Alex Hale kick (Drive: 6 plays, 86 yards, 2:06; Oklahoma State 10–7)
- (4:27) OKST – Alex Hale 40-yard field goal (Drive: 12 plays, 57 yards, 5:30; Oklahoma State 13–7)
- (0:18) OKST – Alex Hale 29-yard field goal (Drive: 4 plays, -10 yards, 1:43; Oklahoma State 16–7)

Statistics	TLSA	OKST
First downs	15	19
Total yards	277	284
Rushes/yards	32–112	50–141
Passing yards	165	143
Passing: Comp–Att–Int	18–28–1	14–20–1
Time of possession	29:27	30:33

Team	Category	Player	Statistics
Tulsa	Passing	Zach Smith	18/28, 165 yards, TD, INT
Tulsa	Rushing	Deneric Prince	14 carries, 82 yards
Tulsa	Receiving	Josh Johnson	5 receptions, 63 yards, TD
Oklahoma State	Passing	Shane Illingworth	4/5, 79 yards
Oklahoma State	Rushing	Chuba Hubbard	27 carries, 93 yards, TD
Oklahoma State	Receiving	Tylan Wallace	4 receptions, 99 yards

=== vs West Virginia ===
West Virginia Mountaineers (1–0) vs No. 15 Oklahoma State Cowboys (1–0)

Quarter	1	2	3	4	Total
Mountaineers	0	7	3	3	13
No. 15 Cowboys	0	20	0	7	27

at Boone Pickens Stadium • Stillwater, OK

- Date: Saturday, September 26, 2020
- Game time: 2:30 p.m. CDT
- Game weather: •Sunny Temperature: 87
- Game attendance: 14,672
- Referee: David Alvarez
- TV announcers (ABC): Bob Wischusen (play-by-play), Dan Orlovsky (analyst), Kris Budden (sideline)

Game information

First Quarter

None

Second Quarter

- (13:43) OKST – LD Brown 66-yard run, Alex Hale kick (Drive: 3 plays, 76 yards, 1:04; Oklahoma State 7–0)
- (11:07) OKST – Tyren Irby 56-yard fumble return, Alex Hale kick (Drive: 8 plays, 31 yards, 2:36; Oklahoma State 14–0)
- (5:02) OKST – Alex Hale 40-yard field goal (Drive: 7 plays, 48 yards, 2:22; Oklahoma State 17–0)
- (3:48) WVU – Winston Wright Jr. 70-yard pass from Jarret Doege, Evan Staley kick (Drive: 3 plays, 75 yards, 1:14; Oklahoma State 17–7)
- (0:03) OKST – Alex Hale 40-yard field goal (Drive: 8 plays, 40 yards, 0:56; Oklahoma State 20–7)

Third Quarter

- (0:37) WVU – Evan Staley 26-yard field goal (Drive: 6 plays, 32 yards, 2:12; Oklahoma State 20–10)

Fourth Quarter

- (9:01) WVU – Evan Staley 30-yard field goal (Drive: 11 plays, 57 yards, 4:40; Oklahoma State 20–13)
- (1:17) OKST – Chuba Hubbard 23-yard run, Alex Hale kick (Drive: 15 plays, 80 yards, 7:44; Oklahoma State 27–13)

Statistics	WVU	OKST
First downs	22	20
Total yards	353	342
Rushes/yards	42–68	41–203
Passing yards	285	139
Passing: Comp–Att–Int	20–37–0	15–22–1
Time of possession	32:51	27:09

Team	Category	Player	Statistics
West Virginia	Passing	Jarret Doege	20/37, 285 yards, TD
West Virginia	Rushing	Leddie Brown	26 carries, 104 yards
West Virginia	Receiving	Winston Wright Jr.	6 receptions, 127 yards, TD
Oklahoma State	Passing	Shane Illingworth	15/21, 139 yards, INT
Oklahoma State	Rushing	LD Brown	11 carries, 103 yards, TD
Oklahoma State	Receiving	Tylan Wallace	6 receptions, 78 yards

=== At Kansas ===
No. 17 Oklahoma State Cowboys (2–0) at Kansas Jayhawks (0–2)

Quarter	1	2	3	4	Total
No. 17 Cowboys	10	21	13	3	47
Jayhawks	0	0	0	7	7

at David Booth Kansas Memorial Stadium • Lawrence, KS

- Date: Saturday, October 3, 2020
- Game time: 2:30 p.m. CDT
- Game weather: •Partly Cloudy Temperature: 67
- Game attendance: 9,480
- Referee: Kevin Hassell
- TV announcers (ESPN): Dave Pasch (play-by-play), Mike Golic (analyst), Quint Kessenich (sideline)

Game information

First Quarter

- (9:36) OKST – Alex Hale 19-yard field goal (Drive: 13 plays, 67 yards, 4:14; Oklahoma State 3–0)
- (1:00) OKST – Chuba Hubbard 1-yard run, Alex Hale kick (Drive: 8 plays, 29 yards, 3:06; Oklahoma State 10–0)

Second Quarter

- (14:04) OKST – Braydon Johnson 66-yard pass from Shane Illingworth, Alex Hale kick (Drive: 1 play, 66 yards, 0:12; Oklahoma State 17–0)
- (9:22) OKST – Tylan Wallace 55-yard pass from Shane Illingworth, Alex Hale kick (Drive: 5 plays, 85 yards, 1:52; Oklahoma State 24–0)
- (1:58) OKST – Chuba Hubbard 12-yard run, Alex Hale kick (Drive: 11 plays, 88 yards, 2:50; Oklahoma State 31–0)

Third Quarter

- (13:14) OKST – Tylan Wallace 14-yard pass from Shane Illingworth, Alex Hale kick (Drive: 7 plays, 68 yards, 1:46; Oklahoma State 38–0)
- (8:12) OKST – Alex Hale 22-yard field goal (Drive: 8 plays, 29 yards, 3:23; Oklahoma State 41–0)
- (3:14) OKST – Alex Hale 27-yard field goal (Drive: 10 plays, 44 yards, 3:04; Oklahoma State 44–0)

Fourth Quarter

- (12:04) KU – Velton Gardner 1-yard run, Jacob Borcila kick (Drive: 5 plays, 52 yards, 1:54; Oklahoma State 44–7)
- (0:59) OKST – Brady Pohl 24-yard field goal (Drive: 14 plays, 51 yards, 5:18; Oklahoma State 47–7)

Statistics	OKST	KAN
First downs	31	12
Total yards	593	193
Rushes/yards	60–295	40–101
Passing yards	298	92
Passing: Comp–Att–Int	20–30–0	14–24–1
Time of possession	31:54	28:06

Team	Category	Player	Statistics
Oklahoma State	Passing	Shane Illingworth	17/23, 265 yards, 3 TD
Oklahoma State	Rushing	Chuba Hubbard	20 carries, 145 yards, 2 TD
Oklahoma State	Receiving	Tylan Wallace	9 receptions, 148 yards, 2 TD
Kansas	Passing	Miles Kendrick	11/19, 90 yards, INT
Kansas	Rushing	Daniel Hishaw Jr.	5 carries, 51 yards
Kansas	Receiving	Kwamie Lassiter II	4 receptions, 43 yards

=== vs Iowa State ===
No. 17 Iowa State Cyclones (2–1) vs No. 6 Oklahoma State Cowboys (3–0)

Quarter	1	2	3	4	Total
No. 17 Cyclones	7	0	7	7	21
No. 6 Cowboys	7	7	7	3	24

at Boone Pickens Stadium • Stillwater, OK

- Date: Saturday, October 24, 2020
- Game time: CDT
- Game weather: •Cloudy Temperature: 54
- Game attendance: 14,671
- Referee: Tuta Salaam
- TV announcers (FOX): Tim Brando (play-by-play), Spencer Tillman (analyst)

Game information

First Quarter

- (6:57) ISU – Brock Purdy 11-yard run, Connor Assalley kick (Drive: 3 plays, 26 yards, 1:52; Iowa State 7–0)
- (0:55) OKST – Jelani Woods 34-yard pass from Spencer Sanders, Alex Hale kick (Drive: 3 plays, 69 yards, 0:52; Tied 7–7)

Second Quarter

- (9:50) OKST – Chuba Hubbard 32-yard run, Alex Hale kick (Drive: 12 plays, 79 yards, 4:17; Oklahoma State 14–7)

Third Quarter

- (10:12) ISU – Breece Hall 66-yard run, Connor Assalley kick (Drive: 4 plays, 74 yards, 1:59; Tied 14–14)
- (8:44) OKST – Spencer Sanders 14-yard run, Alex Hale kick (Drive: 4 plays, 67 yards, 1:28; Oklahoma State 21–14)

Fourth Quarter

- (11:27) OKST – Alex Hale 31-yard field goal (Drive: 6 plays, 32 yards, 1:28; Oklahoma State 24–14)
- (0:49) ISU – Xavier Hutchinson 20-yard pass from Brock Purdy, Connor Assalley kick (Drive: 10 plays, 83 yards, 2:34; Oklahoma State 24–21)

Statistics	ISU	OKST
First downs	18	24
Total yards	389	461
Rushes/yards	33–227	51–226
Passing yards	162	235
Passing: Comp–Att–Int	19–34–1	20–29–2
Time of possession	29:56	30:04

Team	Category	Player	Statistics
Iowa State	Passing	Brock Purdy	19/34, 162 yards, TD, INT
Iowa State	Rushing	Breece Hall	20 carries, 185 yards, TD
Iowa State	Receiving	Xavier Hutchinson	8 receptions, 68 yards, TD
Oklahoma State	Passing	Spencer Sanders	20/29, 235 yards, TD, 2 INT
Oklahoma State	Rushing	Chuba Hubbard	25 carries, 139 yards, TD
Oklahoma State	Receiving	Tylan Wallace	5 receptions, 76 yards

=== vs Texas ===
No. 19 Texas Longhorns (3–2) vs No. 6 Oklahoma State Cowboys (4–0)

Quarter	1	2	3	4	OT	Total
No. 19 Longhorns	7	13	6	8	7	41
No. 6 Cowboys	14	10	7	3	0	34

at Boone Pickens Stadium • Stillwater, OK

- Date: Saturday, October 31, 2020
- Game time: 3:00 p.m. CDT
- Game weather: Sunny • Temperature: 67 °F (19 °C) • Wind: S 15 mph (24 km/h)
- Game attendance: 14,672
- Referee: David Alvarez
- TV announcers (FOX): Joe Davis (play-by-play), Mark Helfrich (analyst)

Game information

First Quarter

- (10:23) OKST – Tylan Wallace 11-yard pass from Spencer Sanders, Alex Hale kick (Drive: 7 plays, 86 yards, 2:19; Oklahoma State 7–0)
- (8:31) TEX – Keaontay Ingram 1-yard run, Cameron Dicker kick (Drive: 3 plays, 15 yards, 0:39; Tied 7–7)
- (1:36) OKST – Landon Wolf 5-yard pass from Spencer Sanders, Alex Hale kick (Drive: 5 plays, 62 yards, 2:07; Oklahoma State 14–7)

Second Quarter

- (13:20) TEX – Brennan Eagles 41-yard pass from Sam Ehlinger, Cameron Dicker kick (Drive: 7 plays, 75 yards, 3:16; Tied 14–14)
- (10:56) TEX – Cameron Dicker 20-yard field goal (Drive: 4 plays, 5 yards, 1:12; Texas 17–14)
- (8:15) OKST – Chuba Hubbard 5-yard pass from Spencer Sanders, Alex Hale kick (Drive: 7 plays, 75 yards, 2:41; Oklahoma State 21–17)
- (1:49) OKST – Alex Hale 31-yard field goal (Drive: 13 plays, 69 yards, 4:45; Oklahoma State 24–17)
- (0:03) TEX – Cameron Dicker 40-yard field goal (Drive: 3 plays, -3 yards, 0:21; Oklahoma State 24–20)

Third Quarter

- (8:09) OKST – Tylan Wallace 9-yard pass from Spencer Sanders, Alex Hale kick (Drive: 10 plays, 72 yards, 3:11; Oklahoma State 31–20)
- (7:57) TEX – D'Shawn Jamison 100-yard kickoff return (Drive: 0 plays, 0 yards, 0:12; Oklahoma State 31–26)

Fourth Quarter

- (4:27) TEX – Jake Smith 12-yard pass from Sam Ehlinger, Sam Ehlinger two-point pass to Cade Brewer (Drive: 15 plays, 68 yards, 7:42; Texas 34–31)
- (0:05) OKST – Alex Hale 34-yard field goal (Drive: 11 plays, 88 yards, 1:08; Tied 34–34)

Overtime

- (0:00) TEX – Joshua Moore 15-yard pass from Spencer Sanders, Cameron Dicker kick (Drive: 4 plays, 25 yards; Texas 41–34)

Statistics	TEX	OKST
First downs	17	32
Total yards	287	530
Rushes/yards	40–118	51–130
Passing yards	169	400
Passing: Comp–Att–Int	18–35–0	27–40–1
Time of possession	31:37	28:23

Team	Category	Player	Statistics
Texas	Passing	Sam Ehlinger	18/34, 169 yards, 3 TD
Texas	Rushing	Bijan Robinson	13 carries, 59 yards
Texas	Receiving	Jake Smith	7 receptions, 70 yards, TD
Oklahoma State	Passing	Spencer Sanders	27/39, 400 yards, 4 TD, INT
Oklahoma State	Rushing	Chuba Hubbard	25 carries, 72 yards
Oklahoma State	Receiving	Tylan Wallace	11 receptions, 187 yards, 2 TD

=== At Kansas State ===
No. 14 Oklahoma State Cowboys (4–1) at Kansas State Wildcats (4–2)

Quarter	1	2	3	4	Total
No. 14 Cowboys	0	0	13	7	20
Wildcats	3	9	0	6	18

at Bill Snyder Family Stadium • Manhattan, KS

- Date: Saturday, November 7, 2020
- Game time: CST
- Game weather: •Sunny Temperature: 75
- Game attendance: 11,980
- Referee: Michael Vandervelde
- TV announcers (FOX): Tim Brando (play-by-play), Spencer Tillman (analyst)

Game information

First Quarter

- (4:35) KSU – Blake Lynch 30-yard field goal (Drive: 11 plays, 56 yards, 5:14; Kansas State 3–0)

Second Quarter

- (8:58) KSU – Blake Lynch 29-yard field goal (Drive: 11 plays, 69 yards, 5:53; Kansas State 6–0)
- (0:37) KSU – Phillip Brooks 4-yard pass from Will Howard (Drive: 9 plays, 89 yards, 2:14; Kansas State 12–0)

Third Quarter

- (10:39) OKST – Alex Hale 35-yard field goal (Drive: 9 plays, 56 yards, 2:15; Kansas State 12–3)
- (7:30) OKST – Brennan Presley 9-yard run, Alex Hale kick (Drive: 4 plays, 51 yards, 2:10; Kansas State 12–10)
- (0:58) OKST – Alex Hale 33-yard field goal (Drive: 11 plays, 55 yards, 4:42; Oklahoma State 13–12)

Fourth Quarter

- (6:32) OKST – Jason Taylor II 85-yard fumble return, Alex Hale kick (Drive: 4 plays, 70 yards, 2:08; Oklahoma State 20–12)
- (2:08) KSU – Will Howard 2-yard run (Drive: 8 plays, 60 yards, 4:17; Oklahoma State 20–18)

Statistics	OKST	KSU
First downs	14	15
Total yards	256	370
Rushes/yards	40–148	44–227
Passing yards	108	143
Passing: Comp–Att–Int	14–23–0	10–22–1
Time of possession	28:09	31:51

Team	Category	Player	Statistics
Oklahoma State	Passing	Spencer Sanders	14/23, 108 yards
Oklahoma State	Rushing	LD Brown	15 carries, 110 yards
Oklahoma State	Receiving	Dillon Stoner	7 receptions, 62 yards
Kansas State	Passing	Will Howard	10/21, 143 yards, TD, INT
Kansas State	Rushing	Will Howard	14 carries, 125 yards, TD
Kansas State	Receiving	Sammy Wheeler	1 reception, 58 yards

=== At Oklahoma ===
No. 14 Oklahoma State Cowboys (5–1) at No. 18 Oklahoma Sooners (5–2)

Quarter	1	2	3	4	Total
No. 14 Cowboys	7	6	0	0	13
No. 18 Sooners	21	6	0	14	41

at Gaylord Family Oklahoma Memorial Stadium • Norman, OK

- Date: Saturday, November 21, 2020
- Game time: CST
- Game weather: •Rainy Temperature: 54
- Game attendance: 22,700
- Referee: David Alvarez
- TV announcers (ABC): Chris Fowler (play-by-play), Kirk Herbstreit (analyst), Holly Rowe (sideline)

Game information

First Quarter

- (12:37) OU – Spencer Rattler 9-yard run, Gabe Brkic kick (Drive: 6 plays, 75 yards, 2:23; Oklahoma 7–0)
- (8:26) OU – Mikey Henderson 20-yard pass from Spencer Rattler, Gabe Brkic kick (Drive: 6 plays, 74 yards, 3:13; Oklahoma 14–0)
- (6:09) OU – Theo Wease 9-yard pass from Spencer Rattler, Gabe Brkic kick (Drive: 4 plays, 20 yards, 1:44; Oklahoma 21–0)
- (2:03) OKST – Logan Carter 15-yard pass from Shane Illingworth, Brady Pohl kick (Drive: 11 plays, 75 yards, 4:06; Oklahoma 21–7)

Second Quarter

- (13:33) OU – Gabe Brkic 40-yard field goal (Drive: 9 plays, 52 yards, 3:30; Oklahoma 24–7)
- (8:39) OU – Gabe Brkic 29-yard field goal (Drive: 8 plays, 52 yards, 4:22; Oklahoma 27–7)
- (4:57) OKST – Brady Pohl 38-yard field goal (Drive: 8 plays, 56 yards, 3:42; Oklahoma 27–10)
- (1:38) OKST – Brady Pohl 37-yard field goal (Drive: 6 plays, 44 yards, 2:11; Oklahoma 27–13)

Third Quarter

None

Fourth Quarter

- (14:15) OU – Jeremiah Hall 30-yard pass from Spencer Rattler, Gabe Brkic kick (Drive: 6 plays, 80 yards, 2:47; Oklahoma 34–13)
- (6:28) OU – Theo Wease 31-yard pass from Spencer Rattler, Gabe Brkic kick (Drive: 9 plays, 99 yards, 5:24; Oklahoma 41–13)

Statistics	OKST	OKLA
First downs	19	23
Total yards	246	492
Rushes/yards	28–78	44–191
Passing yards	168	301
Passing: Comp–Att–Int	15–40–1	17–24–0
Time of possession	25:08	34:52

Team	Category	Player	Statistics
Oklahoma State	Passing	Spencer Sanders	10/19, 97 yards, INT
Oklahoma State	Rushing	Chuba Hubbard	8 carries, 44 yards
Oklahoma State	Receiving	Tylan Wallace	4 receptions, 68 yards
Oklahoma	Passing	Spencer Rattler	17/24, 301 yards, 4 TD
Oklahoma	Rushing	Rhamondre Stevenson	26 carries, 144 yards
Oklahoma	Receiving	Marvin Mims	3 receptions, 65 yards

=== vs Texas Tech ===
Texas Tech Red Raiders (3–5) vs No. 23 Oklahoma State Cowboys (5–2)

Quarter	1	2	3	4	Total
Red Raiders	7	10	14	13	44
No. 23 Cowboys	7	14	20	9	50

at Boone Pickens Stadium • Stillwater, OK

- Date: Saturday, November 28, 2020
- Game time: CST
- Game weather: •Cloudy Temperature: 46
- Game attendance: 14,645
- Referee: Brandon Cruse
- TV announcers (FOX): Joe Davis (play-by-play), Mark Helfrich (analyst)

Game information

First Quarter

- (7:01) TTU – SaRodorick Thompson 59-yard run, Jonathan Garibay kick (Drive: 8 plays, 80 yards, 3:00; Texas Tech 7–0)
- (4:19) OKST – Dezmon Jackson 1-yard run, Brady Pohl kick (Drive: 8 plays, 79 yards, 2:42; Tied 7–7)

Second Quarter

- (11:54) OKST – Dezmon Jackson 7-yard run, Brady Pohl kick (Drive: 6 plays, 61 yards, 1:21; Oklahoma State 14–7)
- (9:33) TTU – SaRodorick Thompson 24-yard run, Jonathan Garibay kick (Drive: 7 plays, 85 yards, 2:21; Tied 14–14)
- (6:22) OKST – Dezmon Jackson 7-yard run, Brady Pohl kick (Drive: 10 plays, 75 yards, 3:11; Oklahoma State 21–14)
- (2:28) TTU – Jonathan Garibay 44-yard field goal (Drive: 4 plays, 6 yards, 1:32; Oklahoma State 21–17)

Third Quarter

- (7:15) TTU – Erik Ezukanma 48-yard pass from Alan Bowman, Jonathan Garibay kick (Drive: 4 plays, 73 yards, 1:49; Texas Tech 24–21)
- (7:09) OKST – Jason Taylor II 48-yard kickoff return, Brady Pohl kick (Drive: 0 plays, 0 yards, 0:06; Oklahoma State 28–24)
- (3:23) OKST – Tre Sterling 65-yard interception return (Drive: 8 plays, 40 yards, 3:46; Oklahoma State 34–24)
- (2:32) TTU – Xavier White 70-yard run, Jonathan Garibay kick (Drive: 2 plays, 75 yards, 0:51; Oklahoma State 34–31)
- (1:22) OKST – Tylan Wallace 27-yard pass from Spencer Sanders, Brady Pohl kick (Drive: 3 plays, 73 yards, 1:10; Oklahoma State 41–31)

Fourth Quarter

- (9:44) OKST – Spencer Sanders 9-yard run, Brady Pohl kick (Drive: 5 plays, 50 yards, 1:29; Oklahoma State 48–31)
- (8:50) OKST – Team Safety (Drive: 2 plays, -19 yards, 0:54; Oklahoma State 50–31)
- (3:57) TTU – Erik Ezukanma 32-yard pass from Alan Bowman (Drive: 10 plays, 90 yards, 2:37; Oklahoma State 50–37)
- (1:51) TTU – Loic Fouonji 31-yard pass from Alan Bowman, Jonathan Garibay kick (Drive: 8 plays, 59 yards, 1:46; Oklahoma State 50–44)

Statistics	TTU	OKST
First downs	26	29
Total yards	639	539
Rushes/yards	38–255	57–317
Passing yards	384	222
Passing: Comp–Att–Int	31–46–1	19–31–1
Time of possession	29:30	30:30

Team	Category	Player	Statistics
Texas Tech	Passing	Alan Bowman	31/46, 384 yards, 3 TD, INT
Texas Tech	Rushing	SaRodorick Thompson	17 carries, 133 yards, 2 TD
Texas Tech	Receiving	Erik Ezukanma	7 receptions, 183 yards, 2 TD
Oklahoma State	Passing	Spencer Sanders	19/31, 222 yards, TD, INT
Oklahoma State	Rushing	Dezmon Jackson	36 carries, 235 yards, 3 TD
Oklahoma State	Receiving	Tylan Wallace	7 receptions, 129 yards, TD

=== At TCU ===
No. 15 Oklahoma State Cowboys (6–2) at TCU Horned Frogs (4–4)

Quarter	1	2	3	4	Total
No. 15 Cowboys	13	3	6	0	22
Horned Frogs	0	7	14	8	29

at Amon G. Carter Stadium • Fort Worth, TX

- Date: Saturday, December 5, 2020
- Game time: CST
- Game weather: •Sunny Temperature: 52
- Game attendance: 12,594
- Referee: Tim Salaam
- TV announcers (ESPN): Sean McDonough (play-by-play), Todd Blackledge (analyst), Molly McGrath (sideline)

Game information

First Quarter

- (10:47) OKST – Brock Martin 42-yard fumble return, Ben Freehill kick (Drive: 7 plays, 22 yards, 2:36; Oklahoma State 7–0)
- (4:11) OKST – Dezmon Jackson 1-yard run (Drive: 7 plays, 57 yards, 2:12; Oklahoma State 14–0)

Second Quarter

- (0:42) TCU – Max Duggan 1-yard run, Griffin Kiel kick (Drive: 5 plays, 47 yards, 0:33; Oklahoma State 14–7)
- (0:00) OKST – Brady Pohl 31-yard field goal (Drive: 7 plays, 49 yards, 0:42; Oklahoma State 17–7)

Third Quarter

- (9:47) TCU – Max Duggan 42-yard run, Griffin Kiel kick (Drive: 11 plays, 75 yards, 5:13; Oklahoma State 17–14)
- (6:10) TCU – Zach Evans 1-yard run, Griffin Kiel kick (Drive: 6 plays, 68 yards, 2:51; TCU 21–17)
- (0:07) OKST – Tylan Wallace 55-yard pass from Spencer Sanders (Drive: 1 play, 55 yards, 0:09; Oklahoma State 22–21)

Fourth Quarter

- (7:56) TCU – Derius Davis 71-yard pass from Max Duggan, Max Duggan two-point pass to Quentin Johnston (Drive: 4 plays, 90 yards, 1:00; TCU 29–22)

Statistics	OKST	TCU
First downs	16	21
Total yards	418	501
Rushes/yards	40–148	52–236
Passing yards	270	265
Passing: Comp–Att–Int	16–36–1	12–26–1
Time of possession	28:09	31:51

Team	Category	Player	Statistics
Oklahoma State	Passing	Spencer Sanders	16/34, 270 yards, TD, INT
Oklahoma State	Rushing	Dezmon Jackson	29 carries, 118 yards, TD
Oklahoma State	Receiving	Tylan Wallace	7 receptions, 92 yards, TD
TCU	Passing	Max Duggan	12/26, 265 yards, TD, INT
TCU	Rushing	Max Duggan	19 carries, 104 yards, 2 TD
TCU	Receiving	Derius Davis	6 receptions, 139 yards, TD

=== At Baylor ===
No. 22 Oklahoma State Cowboys (6–3) at Baylor Bears (2–6)

Quarter	1	2	3	4	Total
No. 22 Cowboys	14	14	7	7	42
Bears	0	0	0	3	3

at McLane Stadium • Waco, TX

- Date: Saturday, December 12, 2020
- Game time: CST
- Game weather: Fair • Temperature: 57
- Game attendance: 11,667
- Referee: Brad Van Vark
- TV announcers (FOX): Jason Benetti (play-by-play), Brock Huard (analyst)

Game information

First Quarter

- (14:42) OKST – Dillon Stoner 75-yard pass from Spencer Sanders, Brady Pohl kick (Drive: 2 plays, 75 yards, 0:18; Oklahoma State 7–0)
- (3:21) OKST – Dillon Stoner 15-yard pass from Spencer Sanders, Brady Pohl kick (Drive: 11 plays, 92 yards, 4:58; Oklahoma State 14–0)

Second Quarter

- (14:21) OKST – Dillon Stoner 40-yard pass from Spencer Sanders, Brady Pohl kick (Drive: 6 plays, 67 yards, 2:20; Oklahoma State 21–0)
- (11:30) OKST – Dominic Richardson 17-yard run, Brady Pohl kick (Drive: 4 plays, 50 yards, 1:21; Oklahoma State 28–0)

Third Quarter

- (2:38) OKST – Dominic Richardson 2-yard run, Brady Pohl kick (Drive: 8 plays, 75 yards, 3:13; Oklahoma State 35–0)

Fourth Quarter

- (7:55) BAY – John Mayers 40-yard field goal (Drive: 14 plays, 57 yards, 4:25; Oklahoma State 35–3)
- (4:49) OKST – Dominic Richardson 1-yard run, Brady Pohl kick (Drive: 7 plays, 75 yards, 3:06; Oklahoma State 42–3)

Statistics	OKST	BAY
First downs	27	12
Total yards	608	156
Rushes/yards	47–261	31–70
Passing yards	347	86
Passing: Comp–Att–Int	20–30–2	18–34–0
Time of possession	33:45	26:15

Team	Category	Player	Statistics
Oklahoma State	Passing	Spencer Sanders	20/30, 347 yards, 3 TD, 2 INT
Oklahoma State	Rushing	Dominic Richardson	23 carries, 169 yards, 2 TD
Oklahoma State	Receiving	Dillon Stoner	8 receptions, 247 yards, 3 TD
Baylor	Passing	Charlie Brewer	13/26, 68 yards
Baylor	Rushing	Taye McWilliams	5 carries, 33 yards
Baylor	Receiving	Qualan Jones	8 receptions, 37 yards

=== vs Miami (2020 Cheez-It Bowl) ===
No. 18 Miami Hurricanes (8–2) vs No. 21 Oklahoma State Cowboys (7–3)

Quarter	1	2	3	4	Total
No. 21 Cowboys	21	0	3	13	37
No. 18 Hurricanes	0	10	9	15	34

at Camping World Stadium • Orlando, Florida

- Date: Saturday, December 29, 2020
- Game time: 4:30 p.m. CDT
- Game weather: Sunny • Temperature: 70 °F (21 °C) • Wind: ENE 12 mph
- Referee: Steve Marlowe (SEC)
- TV announcers (ESPN): Dave O'Brien (play-by-play), Tim Hasselbeck (analyst) and Katie George (sideline)
- ESPN game summary

Game information

First quarter

- (11:39) OKST – Brennan Presley 30 yard pass from Spencer Sanders, Brady Pohl kick (Drive: 10 plays, 75 yards, 3:21; Oklahoma State 7–0)
- (5:25) OKST – LD Brown 2 yard rush, Brady Pohl kick (Drive: 8 plays, 82 yards, 3:49; Oklahoma State 14–0)
- (0:56) OKST – Brennan Presley 32 yard pass from Spencer Sanders, Brady Pohl kick (Drive: 6 plays, 49 yards, 2:17; Oklahoma State 21–0)

Second quarter

- (14:14) MIA – Brevin Jordan 10 yard pass from D'Eriq King, José Borregales kick (Drive: 5 plays, 68 yards, 1:42; Oklahoma State 21–7)
- (3:55) MIA – José Borregales 22 yard field goal (Drive: 14 plays, 75 yards, 4:46; Oklahoma State 21–10)

Third quarter

- (13:25) MIA – José Borregales 40 yard field goal (Drive: 8 plays, 41 yards, 1:35; Oklahoma State 21–13)
- (8:45) MIA – Cam'Ron Harris 42 yard rush, 2-point pass failed (Drive: 8 plays, 80 yards, 2:56; Oklahoma State 21–19)
- (2:57) OKST – Brady Pohl 26 yard field goal (Drive: 17 plays, 71 yards, 5:48; Oklahoma State 24–19)

Fourth quarter

- (14:19) OKST – Dillon Stoner 5 yard pass from Spencer Sanders, Brady Pohl kick (Drive: 7 plays, 45 yards, 2:43; Oklahoma State 31–19)
- (12:03) MIA – Brevin Jordan 1 yard pass from N'Kosi Perry, José Borregales kick (Drive: 7 plays, 80 yards, 2:16; Oklahoma State 31–26)
- (9:55) OKST – Brennan Presley 16 yard pass from Spencer Sanders, kick missed (Drive: 7 plays, 75 yards, 2:08; Oklahoma State 37–26)
- (5:39) MIA – Mike Harley Jr. 5 yard pass from N'Kosi Perry, Marshall Few 2-point conversion rush (Drive: 10 plays, 75 yards, 4:16; Oklahoma State 37–34)

Statistics	MIA	OKST
First downs	29	27
Total yards	418	512
Rushes/yards	43–113	30–156
Passing yards	305	356
Passing: Comp–Att–Int	27–40–0	30–48–0
Time of possession	33:49	26:11

Team	Category	Player	Statistics
Miami	Passing	N'Kosi Perry	19/34, 228 yards, 2 TD
Miami	Rushing	Cam'Ron Harris	6 carries, 52 yards, TD
Miami	Receiving	Brevin Jordan	8 receptions, 96 yards, 2 TD
Oklahoma State	Passing	Spencer Sanders	27/40, 305 yards, 4 TD
Oklahoma State	Rushing	Spencer Sanders	13 carries, 45 yards
Oklahoma State	Receiving	Brennan Presley	6 receptions, 118 yards, 3 TD

== Rankings ==
Ranking movements Legend: ██ Increase in ranking ██ Decrease in ranking RV = Received votes
	Week																	
Poll	Pre	1	2	3	4	5	6	7	8	9	10	11	12	13	14	15	16	Final
AP	15	15*	11	15	17	10	7	6	6	14	14	14	21	19	RV	RV	RV	20
Coaches	16	16*	12	18	19	10	7	6	6	12	13	14	22	18	RV	22	21	19
CFP	Not released												23	15	22	21	21	Not released

== Players drafted into the NFL ==
Round	Pick	Player	Position	NFL Club
2	39	Teven Jenkins	OT	Chicago Bears
4	126	Chuba Hubbard	RB	Carolina Panthers
4	131	Tylan Wallace	WR	Baltimore Ravens
6	201	Rodarius Williams	CB	New York Giants
