= Notre Dame Preparatory High School (Arizona) =

Location
- 9701 East Bell Road; Scottsdale, Arizona 85260; United States; 33°38′25″N 111°52′37″W

Information
- Type: Private college-preparatory school
- Religious affiliation: Roman Catholic
- Established: 2002; 24 years ago
- Founder: David Gonsalves
- Oversight: Diocese of Phoenix
- Principal: Brie Dragonetti
- Chaplain: Fr. Anthony Dang
- Teaching staff: 76.9 (on an FTE basis) (2023–24)
- Grades: 9–12
- Gender: Coeducational
- Enrollment: 975 (2023–24)
- Student to teacher ratio: 12.7:1 (2023–24)
- Colors: Purple and Vegas gold
- Athletics conference: AIA
- Mascot: Samson the Saint Bernard
- Team name: Saints
- Rival: Desert Mountain Brophy Cactus Shadows
- Accreditation: Western Catholic Educational Association; Cognia
- Publication: Perspective (literary magazine)
- Newspaper: The Seraphim
- Yearbook: The Halo
- Affiliation: National Catholic Educational Association (NCEA)
- Website: ndpsaints.org

Notre Dame Preparatory High School is a private Catholic high school located in Scottsdale, Arizona, United States.

== History ==
The school was originally opened by the Tesseract Group, but by January 2001, it was announced they would be closing the school. It was reported there was interest by the Diocese in purchasing the school. The student's parents came together to make a bid on the 18-acre school for $9.6 million. "If we could stay on campus next year, we have time to build a school," said Betsey Kauffman, vice-president of the Tesseract North Scottsdale Foundation, a non-profit group that was formed in October 2000. "We could hold on to our student population and provide some security for our teachers," Kauffman said.

It was reported the Diocese outbid the parents by $2 million.

The site of the school was purchased by the Roman Catholic Diocese of Phoenix in March 2001. It was confirmed the Diocese purchased the 36-acre site for $17 million.

David Gonsalves was appointed by Bishop Thomas O'Brien of the Catholic Diocese of Phoenix, as the first principal of the school.

It was announced in November 2001, the school site would undergo a $9 to $10 million renovation, a gymnasium, chapel, and 16 new classrooms would be constructed for the new school.

Prospective students, were scheduled to take an entrance exam on January 19, 2002, and interview with Principal Gonsalves. Applicants were then notified by March 1, if they were accepted. "I believe our curriculum will be more stringent compared to regular high school," Gonsalves said. "Our goal is to send 100 percent of our kids to higher education."

The school opened in August 2002 with only a freshman and sophomore class. The first class of 72 students graduated on May 21, 2005.

== Demographics ==
The demographic breakdown of the 975 students enrolled for the 2023–2024 school year was:

Enrollment by Race/Ethnicity. View chart definition.

Enrollment by Race/Ethnicity
American Indian / Alaska Native	Asian	Black	Hispanic	White	Native Hawaiian / Pacific Islander	Two or More Races
0.4%	3.5%	1.1%	10.6%	77.6%	0.8%	5.9%

== Notable alumni ==
- Peter Bourjos, baseball player
- Kade Gottlieb, Gottmik, finalist on RuPaul's Drag Race (season 13)
- Jagger Jones, stock car racing driver
- Sean Renfree, football player
- Tayler Scott, baseball player
- Aaron Slegers, baseball player
- Jake Smith, American football player
- Josh Doan, hockey player
- Erika Kirk (née Frantzve), Miss Arizona USA (2012) and widow of Charlie Kirk
