= Jake Smith (American football) =

American football player (born 2001)

No. 8 – Arizona State Sun Devils
- Position: Wide receiver
- Class: Redshirt Senior

Personal information
- Born: January 5, 2001 (age 25); Scottsdale, Arizona, U.S.
- Listed height: 6 ft 0 in (1.83 m)
- Listed weight: 200 lb (91 kg)

Career information
- High school: Notre Dame Prep (Scottsdale, Arizona)
- College: Texas (2019–2020); USC (2021); Arizona State (2023–2024)

Awards and highlights
- Gatorade Football Player of the Year (2018); USA Today All-American (2018)
- Stats at ESPN

Jake Smith (born January 5, 2001) is a former American college football wide receiver. He previously played for the Texas Longhorns, USC Trojans, and Arizona State Sun Devils.

== Early life ==
Smith grew up in Scottsdale, Arizona and attended Notre Dame Preparatory High School. Smith compiled 2,538 all purpose yards in his junior season, including 1,135 rushing and 1,055 receiving and scored 28 total touchdowns and was named first team All-Arizona as an all-purpose player. As a senior, he amassed 2,349 all-purpose yards with 1,070 yards receiving and 741 rushing and 39 total touchdowns and also punted 25 times for 1,008 yards and recorded 20 tackles with 4.5 sacks on defense. Smith was named first team All-State and the Arizona Gatorade Player of the Year and the Gatorade National Football Player of the Year and was invited to play in the 2019 Under Amour All-America Game. He was also named the Arizona Boys Athlete of the Year by The Arizona Republic. Smith was rated a four-star recruit and committed to play college football at Texas during the summer going into his senior year over an offer from USC and after considering offers from Alabama, Ohio State, Clemson and Texas A&M.

== College career ==
Smith played in all 13 of Texas's games in his true freshman season and caught 25 passes for 274 yards and six touchdowns. His six touchdown receptions were the second-most by a freshman in school history behind Roy Williams' eight in 2000. Smith set season-highs with six catches, 75 yards and two touchdowns on September 14, 2019 against Rice.

Smith missed the opening game of his sophomore year due to illness, but returned to the field the next week against TCU. Smith was the Longhorns' leading receiver with seven receptions for 70 yards and a touchdown reception in the fourth quarter in the team's 41-34 overtime win over sixth-ranked Oklahoma State. Smith finished the season with 23 receptions for 294 yards and three touchdowns.

After his sophomore year Smith announced his intent to transfer from Texas. He ultimately committed to play at USC. Smith missed the 2021 season due to a foot injury. Following the season, he was no longer listed on USC's roster. Smith sat out the 2022 season while still enrolled at USC and transferred to Arizona State. He was denied eligibility to play for the Sun Devils immediately by the NCAA because he had not finished his undergraduate degree before transferring a second time.

== Professional career ==
Pre-draft measurables
| Height | Weight |
|---|---|
| 6 ft 0 1/4 in (1.84 m) | 200 lb (91 kg) |
Values from Pro Day
