= D'Juan Woods =

American football player (born 1984)

No. 14
- Position: Wide receiver

Personal information
- Born: June 11, 1984 (age 42); Oklahoma City, Oklahoma, U.S.
- Listed height: 6 ft 1 in (1.85 m)
- Listed weight: 210 lb (95 kg)

Career information
- College: Oklahoma State
- NFL draft: 2007: undrafted

Career history
- Jacksonville Jaguars (2007–2008); New Orleans Saints (2009)

Awards and highlights
- Super Bowl champion (XLIV); Second-team All-Big 12 (2005)
- Stats at Pro Football Reference

D'Juan Woods (born June 11, 1984) is an American former professional football player who was a wide receiver in the National Football League (NFL). He played college football for the Oklahoma State Cowboys and was signed by the Jacksonville Jaguars as an undrafted free agent in 2007.

Woods was also a member of the New Orleans Saints. He was a part of the team that won Super Bowl XLIV. He is the younger brother of former NFL wide receiver Rashaun Woods and older brother of former NFL linebacker Donovan Woods.
