= Rashaun Woods =

American gridiron football player (born 1980)

No. 81
- Position: Wide receiver

Personal information
- Born: October 17, 1980 (age 46); Oklahoma City, Oklahoma, U.S.
- Listed height: 6 ft 2 in (1.88 m)
- Listed weight: 202 lb (92 kg)

Career information
- High school: Millwood (Oklahoma City)
- College: Oklahoma State
- NFL draft: 2004: 1st round, 31st overall pick

Career history
- San Francisco 49ers (2004–2005); San Diego Chargers (2006)*; Denver Broncos (2006)*; Frankfurt Galaxy (2007); Toronto Argonauts (2007); Hamilton Tiger-Cats (2007)
- * Offseason or practice squad member only

Awards and highlights
- Consensus All-American (2002); First-team All-American (2003); 2× First-team All-Big 12 (2002, 2003); Second-team All-Big 12 (2001)

Career NFL statistics
- Receptions: 7
- Receiving yards: 160
- Receiving touchdowns: 1
- Stats at Pro Football Reference

Rashaun Dorrell Woods (born October 17, 1980) is an American former professional football player who was a wide receiver in the National Football League (NFL) and Canadian Football League (CFL). Woods played college football for Oklahoma State Cowboys, receiving All-American honors twice, including a consensus selection in 2002. He was selected by the San Francisco 49ers in the first round of the 2004 NFL draft, and played professionally for the NFL's 49ers, the CFL's Toronto Argonauts and Hamilton Tiger-Cats, and the Frankfurt Galaxy of NFL Europa. Woods currently coaches at Tyler High School in Tyler, Texas (2023–present).

== Early life ==
Woods was born in Oklahoma City, Oklahoma. He attended Millwood High School in Oklahoma City, and played for the Millwood high school football team.

== College career ==
While attending Oklahoma State University, Woods played for the Oklahoma State Cowboys football team from 2000 to 2003. He finished his college career with 293 receptions, 4,414 yards and 42 touchdowns—all Big 12 records. Woods was a two-time all-American, including being recognized as a consensus first-team All-American in 2002. He became the eighth player in NCAA Division I-A annals to gain over 1,000 yards receiving in a season three times in a career. Woods also holds the NCAA single-game record for most touchdown receptions in a game (7 against Southern Methodist University in 2003) and most touchdown receptions in a half (5 in the first half of the same SMU game). All seven touchdowns were thrown by former Kansas City Royals infielder Josh Fields. In 2001, his biggest touchdown catch made during his college career was against Oklahoma Sooners down in Norman, where the unranked OSU Cowboys upset the highly ranked Sooners. Also, the following year he had 3 touchdowns against the Sooners, in the annual Bedlam game 2002.

Woods has two brothers who followed him to Oklahoma State. D'Juan who graduated in 2007, who played wide receiver and Donovan, a former Oklahoma State linebacker who spent time at safety and quarterback, graduated in 2008. D'Juan was picked up by the Jacksonville Jaguars as a free agent after the 2007 NFL draft^{Jaguars.com} while Donovan was a practice squad member of the 2008-09 Pittsburgh Steelers Super Bowl Championship team.

== Professional career ==
Pre-draft measurables
Height	Weight	Arm length	Hand span	40-yard dash	10-yard split	20-yard split	20-yard shuttle	Three-cone drill	Vertical jump	Broad jump
6 ft 2 1/8 in (1.88 m)	202 lb (92 kg)	32 in (0.81 m)	10 1/8 in (0.26 m)	4.50 s	1.63 s	2.64 s	3.97 s	6.93 s	39.0 in (0.99 m)	10 ft 5 in (3.18 m)
All values from NFL Combine

Woods had 7 catches for 160 yards and 1 touchdown in his rookie season (2004) and spent the 2005 season on injured reserve with torn ligaments in his thumb. In April 2006, he was traded to the San Diego Chargers for cornerback Sammy Davis. In August 2006, he was cut from the San Diego Chargers. On August 3, 2006, he was claimed off waivers by the Denver Broncos but failed his physical and was released.

In 2007, the Hamburg Sea Devils selected Woods in the 5th round of the NFL Europa free agent draft. He later played for the Frankfurt Galaxy that season.

On July 23, 2007, Woods signed with the Toronto Argonauts of the Canadian Football League. He was released by the Argonauts on August 8. Woods was signed by the Hamilton Tiger-Cats on October 4. On June 22, 2008, Woods was one of 14 players to be cut from the Tiger-Cats' final roster.

== Coaching career ==
After his playing career ended, Woods worked as an assistant football coach at Millwood and at Star Spencer High School, and also as a high school football radio commentator and professional bass fisherman. In January 2013, Woods was selected to be head football coach at John Marshall High School in Oklahoma City. He led John Marshall to the 3A state championship in 2017. In January 2019, Woods was named head football coach for Enid High School in Enid, Oklahoma. On January 20, 2023, Woods announced that he had accepted a head football coaching position at Tyler High School in Tyler, Texas, effective immediately.

== See also ==
- List of NCAA major college football yearly receiving leaders
- NCAA Division I FBS receiving leaders
