= Dillon Stoner =

American football player (born 1998)

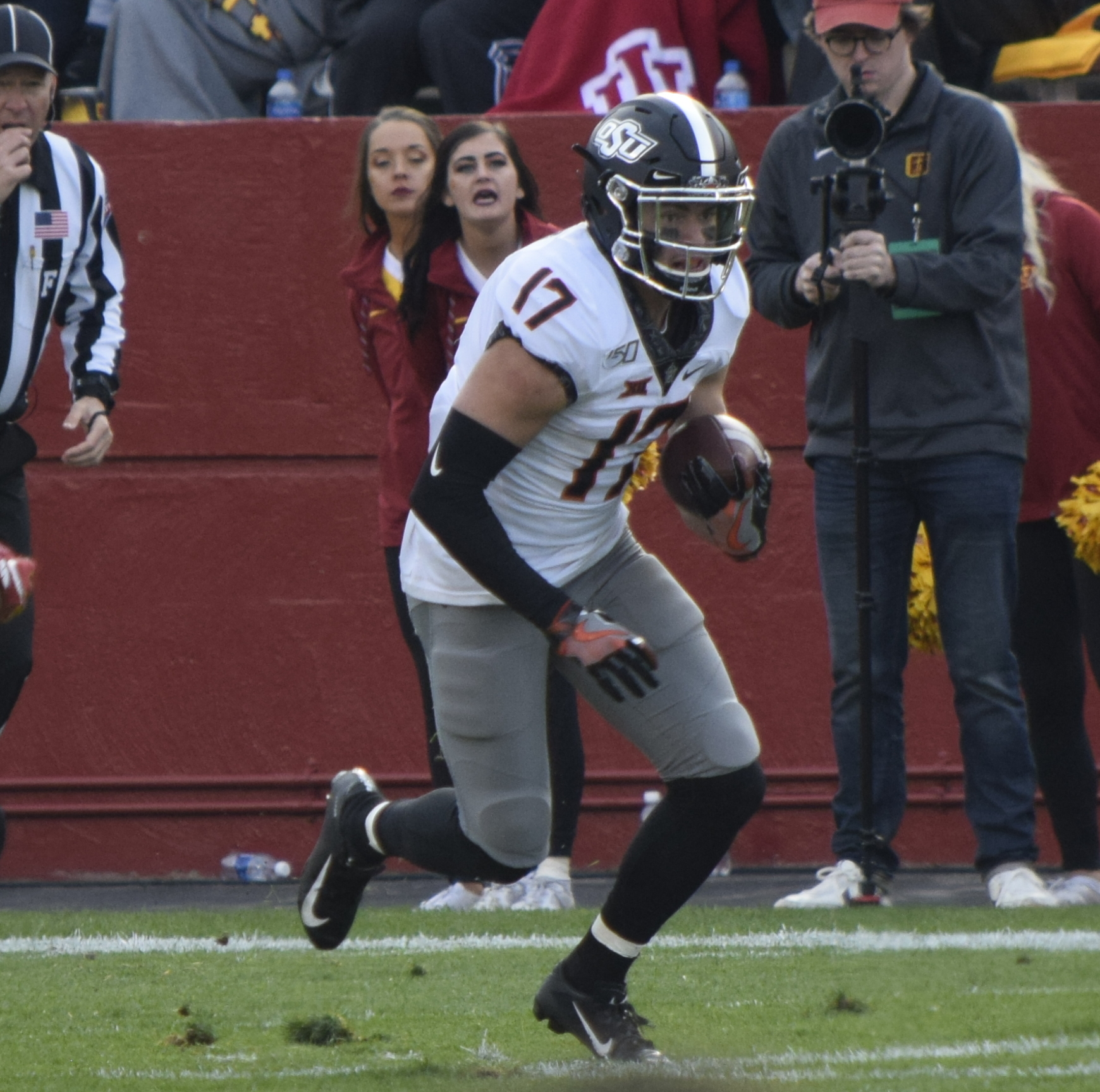
- Stoner playing for Oklahoma State in 2019

Profile
- Position: Wide receiver

Personal information
- Born: February 6, 1998 (age 28); Tulsa, Oklahoma
- Listed height: 6 ft 0 in (1.83 m)
- Listed weight: 194 lb (88 kg)

Career information
- High school: Jenks (Jenks, Oklahoma)
- College: Oklahoma State
- NFL draft: 2021: undrafted

Career history
- Las Vegas Raiders (2021–2022)
- Stats at Pro Football Reference

Dillon Lee Stoner (born February 6, 1998) is an American professional football wide receiver. He played college football at Oklahoma State.

== Early life ==
Stoner grew up in Tulsa, Oklahoma and attended Jenks High School, where he ran track and was a receiver, defensive back, punter and returner for the football team. In track, he won the Class 6A state championship in the 400 meters during his junior year. As a senior, Stoner was named the State Player of the Year by the Tulsa World after he caught 36 passes for 724 yards and 10 touchdowns, averaged 39.8 yards per punt while averaging 24.4 yards on kickoff returns and 11.7 yards on punt returns.

== College career ==
Stoner played in four games as a true freshman before suffering an ankle injury and redshirting the season. Before his injury he had caught five passes for 27 yards while also playing as a wildcat quarterback and completed a two-yard pass for a touchdown against Central Michigan. Stoner became a starter as a redshirt freshman and finished the season with 44 receptions for 576 yards and six touchdowns. As a redshirt junior, Stoner was named honorable mention All-Big 12 Conference after finishing second on the team with 52 receptions for 599 yards and five touchdowns. He was named honorable mention All-Big 12 as both a receiver and as a punt returner in his redshirt senior season after catching 42 passes 573 yards and four touchdowns and returning 15 punts for 91 yards. In the final regular season game against Baylor, Stoner had 247 receiving yards, the third-most in a single game in Oklahoma State history, on eight catches with three touchdown receptions. Stoner finished his college career with 191 receptions for 2,378 yards and 17 touchdowns and returned 55 punts for 372 yards.

== Professional career ==
Pre-draft measurables
Height	Weight	Arm length	Hand span	40-yard dash	10-yard split	20-yard split	20-yard shuttle	Three-cone drill	Vertical jump	Broad jump	Bench press
6 ft 0 1/8 in (1.83 m)	194 lb (88 kg)	30 7/8 in (0.78 m)	9 in (0.23 m)	4.57 s	1.56 s	2.64 s	4.18 s	6.95 s	37.0 in (0.94 m)	10 ft 3 in (3.12 m)	16 reps
All values from Pro Day

=== 2021 ===
Stoner signed with the Las Vegas Raiders as an undrafted free agent on May 7, 2021, with $120,000 of his contract guaranteed.

He was waived during final roster cuts on August 31, 2021, but was signed to the team's practice squad the next day. The Raiders signed Stoner to their active roster on November 4, 2021. He was waived on December 2 and re-signed to the practice squad. After the Raiders were eliminated in the 2021 Wild Card round of the playoffs, he signed a reserve/future contract on January 17, 2022.

=== 2022 ===
On August 30, 2022, Stoner was waived by the Raiders and signed to the practice squad the next day. On September 15, 2022, Stoner was placed on the practice squad's injured/reserve list.
