= Greg Richmond =

American football player and coach (born 1981)

Current position
- Title: Defensive line coach
- Team: Oklahoma State Cowboys
- Conference: Big 12

Biographical details
- Born: July 15, 1981 (age 45); Oklahoma City, Oklahoma, U.S.
- Education: Oklahoma State University

Playing career
- 1999–2003: Oklahoma State Cowboys
- 2003–2004: Philadelphia Eagles
- Position: Linebacker

Coaching career (HC unless noted)
- 2007–2008: Oklahoma State Cowboys (Assistant Director of S & C)
- 2010: Douglas-Covington H.S. (DL)
- 2010–2012: Northeastern State (DL)
- 2014: Talequah H.S. (DL)
- 2015–2017: Fairmont State (DL)
- 2018–2022: Oklahoma State (DL)
- 2024: Sam Houston (DL)
- 2025: North Texas (DL)
- 2026–present: Oklahoma State (DL)

Greg Richmond (born July 15, 1981) is an American former linebacker and defensive line coach previously at Oklahoma State University in Stillwater, Oklahoma. He played college football at Oklahoma State University, graduating in 2003. At Oklahoma State, he earned first team All-Big 12 honors as a senior, leading Oklahoma State to the 2003 Cotton Bowl. After graduation, he played for three years in the National Football League (NFL) as a linebacker signing as an undrafted free agent by the Philadelphia Eagles in 2004.

Richmond stayed with the Eagles until 2007, when he returned to his alma mater to begin his career in coaching as Oklahoma State's assistant director of strength & conditioning followed by a stint at Douglas High School in Oklahoma.

From 2010-12, Richmond served as the defensive line coach at Northeastern State. In 2015, he returned to Northeastern State as the team's strength and conditioning coordinator and also coached the defensive line. Afterwards, he went on to coach the defensive line at Talequah High School, and then the nationally ranked D2 Fairmont State University in West Virginia.

In 2018, Richmond returned to Oklahoma State as a defensive line coach. He was removed from his "dream role" in early 2024.

He was the defensive ends coach at Sam Houston State University during the 2024 season, and afterwards became the defensive ends coach at the University of North Texas in December 2024.
