= Tylan Wallace =

American football player (born 1999)

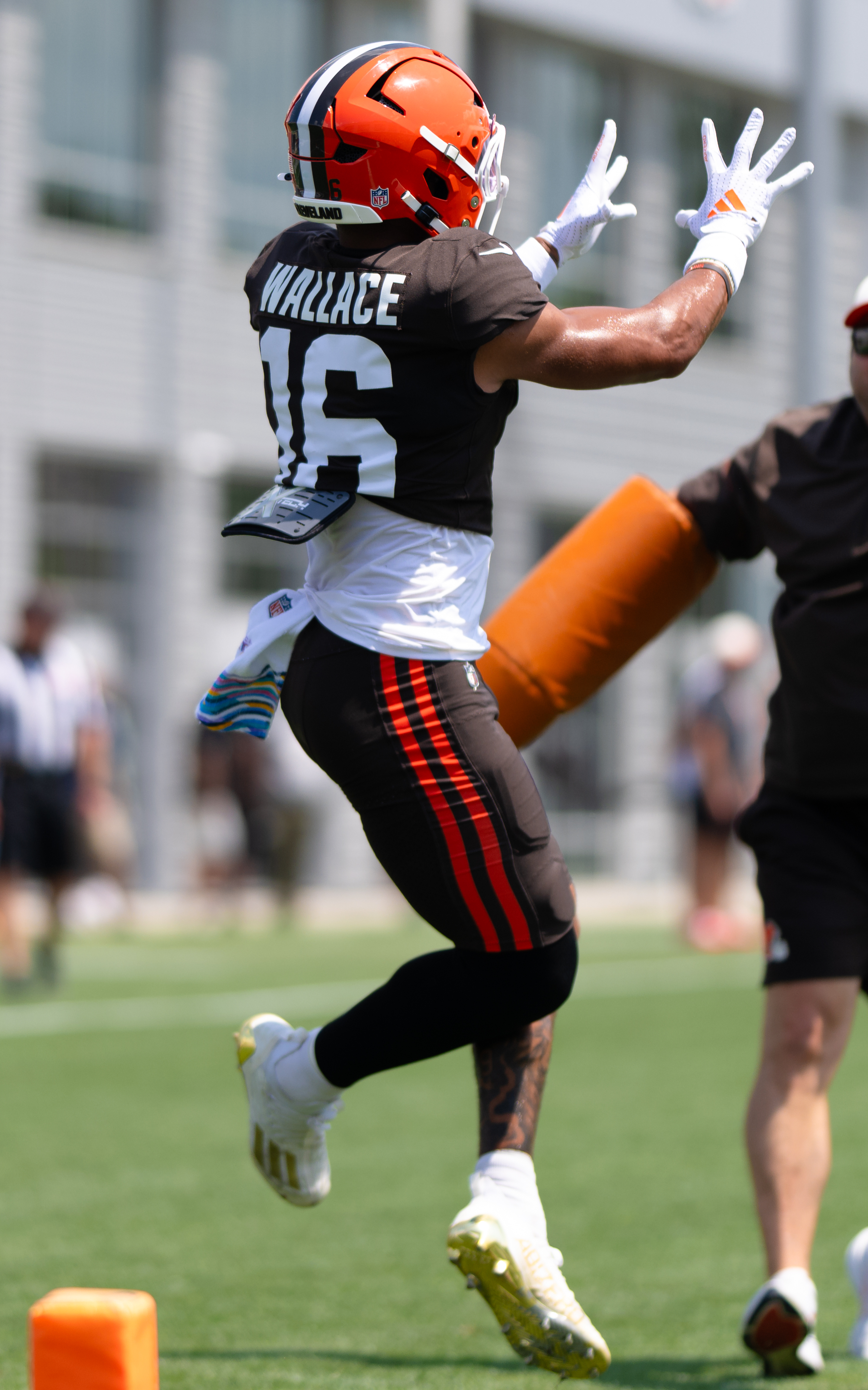
- Wallace with the Cleveland Browns in 2026

No. 16 – Cleveland Browns
- Positions: Wide receiver, kickoff returner

Personal information
- Born: May 13, 1999 (age 27); Fort Worth, Texas, U.S.
- Listed height: 5 ft 11 in (1.80 m)
- Listed weight: 200 lb (91 kg)

Career information
- High school: South Hills (Fort Worth)
- College: Oklahoma State (2017–2020)
- NFL draft: 2021: 4th round, 131st overall pick

Career history
- Baltimore Ravens (2021–2025); Cleveland Browns (2026–present)

Awards and highlights
- First-team All-American (2018); Second-team All-American (2020); 2× First-team All-Big 12 (2018, 2020); Second-team All-Big 12 (2019)

Career NFL statistics as of 2025
- Receptions: 22
- Receiving yards: 305
- Return yards: 382
- Total touchdowns: 3
- Stats at Pro Football Reference

Tylan Michael Wallace (born May 13, 1999) is an American professional football wide receiver and kickoff returner for the Cleveland Browns of the National Football League (NFL). He played college football for the Oklahoma State Cowboys.

== Early life ==
Wallace attended South Hills High School in Fort Worth, Texas. During his career he had 182 receptions for 3,760 yards and 48 touchdowns. He committed to Oklahoma State University, along with his twin brother Tracin, to play college football.

== College career ==
As a freshman at Oklahoma State in 2017, Wallace played in 13 games and had seven receptions for 118 yards. He became a starter in 2018.

== Professional career ==
Pre-draft measurables
Height	Weight	Arm length	Hand span	Wingspan	40-yard dash	10-yard split	20-yard split	20-yard shuttle	Three-cone drill	Vertical jump	Broad jump	Bench press
5 ft 11 3/8 in (1.81 m)	194 lb (88 kg)	30 3/8 in (0.77 m)	9 3/8 in (0.24 m)	6 ft 0 in (1.83 m)	4.49 s	1.53 s	2.66 s	4.25 s	6.97 s	33.0 in (0.84 m)	9 ft 4 in (2.84 m)	11 reps
All values from Pro Day

=== Baltimore Ravens ===
Wallace was selected by the Baltimore Ravens in the fourth round, 131st overall, of the 2021 NFL draft. He signed his four-year rookie contract on May 14, 2021. Wallace was used mostly on special teams during the 2021 season, although he did have one start that year, recording a catch for 18 yards in a 21–41 Week 16 loss to the Cincinnati Bengals.

On December 3, 2022, Wallace was placed on injured reserve. He was activated on January 7, 2023. Wallace returned to injured reserve with a hamstring injury on January 14.

On September 25, 2023, Wallace was placed on injured reserve after suffering a hamstring injury in Week 3. He was activated on October 28.

On December 10, 2023, subbing for an injured Devin Duvernay, he ran a punt back 76 yards for the game-winning touchdown in overtime to beat the Los Angeles Rams 37–31. This was also his first career touchdown. Wallace, who had never returned a punt prior to the game, was named the AFC Special Teams Player of the Week for the game-winning play.

On November 7, 2024, Wallace had an 84-yard receiving touchdown against the Bengals. It was his first career receiving touchdown along with it being the longest touchdown pass in Lamar Jackson’s career. Wallace finished the game with 3 receptions for a career high 115 yards and a touchdown as the Ravens won 35-34.

Wallace re-signed with the Ravens on March 17, 2025. On September 14, Wallace scored his first and only touchdown of the season on a 15-yard pass from Lamar Jackson against the Cleveland Browns. He made 14 appearances (including two starts) for Baltimore, recording four receptions for 45 yards and one touchdown.

=== Cleveland Browns ===
On March 18, 2026, Wallace signed a one-year contract with the Cleveland Browns.

== NFL career statistics ==
Legend
**Bold**	Career high

=== Regular season ===
Year	Team	Games		Receiving					Returning				Fumbles	
Year	Team	GP	GS	Rec	Yds	Avg	Lng	TD	Ret	Yds	Avg	TD	Fum	Lost
2021	BAL	**17**	**1**	2	23	11.5	18	0	2	39	19.5	0	0	0
2022	BAL	9	0	4	33	8.3	12	0	0	0	0.0	0	0	0
2023	BAL	11	0	1	11	11.0	11	0	**7**	**153**	21.9	**1**	0	0
2024	BAL	16	0	**11**	**193**	**17.5**	**84**	**1**	6	67	11.2	0	**1**	0
2025	BAL	10	2	4	45	11.3	15	**1**	5	123	**24.6**	0	0	0
Career		64	3	22	305	13.9	84	2	20	382	19.9	1	1	0
