= Alex Hale =

Australian American former football player (born 1998)

No. 11 – Saskatchewan Roughriders
- Position: Placekicker
- Roster status: Active
- CFL status: Global

Personal information
- Born: 3 July 1998 (age 28); Gosford, New South Wales, Australia
- Listed height: 6 ft 1 in (1.85 m)
- Listed weight: 203 lb (92 kg)

Career information
- High school: St Edward's College, East Gosford (East Gosford, New South Wales, Australia)
- College: Oklahoma State (2018–2023)
- NFL draft: 2024: undrafted

Career history
- Green Bay Packers (2024)*; Saskatchewan Roughriders (2026–present)
- * Offseason or practice squad member only

Awards and highlights
- Second-team All-Big 12 (2023)
- Stats at Pro Football Reference

Alexander Hale (born 3 July 1998) is an Australian professional gridiron football placekicker for the Saskatchewan Roughriders of the Canadian Football League (CFL). He played college football for the Oklahoma State Cowboys.

== Early life ==
Hale was born in and grew up in Gosford, New South Wales, Australia. After graduating from high school, Hale decided to move to the United States to pursue American football, committing to play college football for the Oklahoma State Cowboys as a walk-on.

== College career ==
In Hale's first two seasons in 2018 and 2019, Hale redshirted and appeared in just two games where he kicked off five times. Before the 2020 Bedlam match up, Hale tore his ACL in pregame workouts, causing him to miss the rest of the season. Hale finished the 2020 season going thirteen for fourteen on his field goal attempts, while converting on all ten of his extra point attempts, finishing as a semifinalist for the Lou Groza Award. After coming off his torn ACL over the 2021 and 2022 seasons, Hale lost his starting role where he played sparingly appearing in ten total games going three for six on field goal attempts and 17 for 18 on his extra points. In week twelve of the 2023 season, Hale went three for three on field goal attempts in a win over the Houston Cougars. During Hale's final collegiate season in 2023 he went 27 for 34 on his field goal attempts and 36 for 38 on extra points, with his only two misses being blocks. For his performance in the 2023 season, Hale was named second team all Big-12 as well as finishing as a semifinalist for the Lou Groza Award for the second time in his career.

== Professional career ==
Pre-draft measurables
Height	Weight	Arm length	Hand span	Wingspan
6 ft 0 5/8 in (1.84 m)	203 lb (92 kg)	31 3/4 in (0.81 m)	8 3/8 in (0.21 m)	6 ft 4 3/8 in (1.94 m)
All values from Pro Day

=== Green Bay Packers ===
On 7 August 2024, Hale signed with the Green Bay Packers as an undrafted free agent after going unselected in the 2024 NFL draft. He was released by the Packers on 27 August 2024, but was signed back to their practice squad the next day as part of the NFL International Player Pathway.

Hale signed a reserve/future contract with Green Bay on 13 January 2025. On 21 July 2025, Hale was released by the Packers.

=== Saskatchewan Roughriders ===
On April 17, 2026, Hale signed with the Saskatchewan Roughriders of the Canadian Football League (CFL). For the 2026 season, he won the job as the starting kicker with the Saskatchewan Roughriders.
