= 2020 Oklahoma Sooners football team =

American college football season

2020 Oklahoma Sooners football

Big 12 champion Cotton Bowl Classic champion

Big 12 Championship Game, W 27–21 vs. Iowa State

Cotton Bowl Classic, W 55–20 vs. Florida
- Conference: Big 12 Conference

Ranking
- Coaches: No. 6
- AP: No. 6
- Record: 9–2 (6–2 Big 12)
- Head coach: Lincoln Riley (4th season)
- Co-offensive coordinators: Cale Gundy (4th season); Bill Bedenbaugh (4th season)
- Offensive scheme: Air raid
- Defensive coordinator: Alex Grinch (2nd season)
- Base defense: 3–4
- Home stadium: Gaylord Family Oklahoma Memorial Stadium

2020 Big 12 Conference football standings
	Conf.			Overall
Team	W		L	W		L
No. 9 Iowa State y	8	–	1	9	–	3
No. 6 Oklahoma y$	6	–	2	9	–	2
No. 20 Oklahoma State	6	–	3	8	–	3
No. 19 Texas	5	–	3	7	–	3
TCU	5	–	4	6	–	4
West Virginia	4	–	4	6	–	4
Kansas State	4	–	5	4	–	6
Texas Tech	3	–	6	4	–	6
Baylor	2	–	7	2	–	7
Kansas	0	–	8	0	–	9
Championship: Oklahoma 27, Iowa State 21
$ – Conference champion; y – Championship game participant; Rankings from AP Poll.

The 2020 Oklahoma Sooners football team represented the University of Oklahoma during the 2020 NCAA Division I FBS football season, the 126th season for the Oklahoma Sooners. The team was led by Lincoln Riley, in his fourth year as head coach. They played their home games at Gaylord Family Oklahoma Memorial Stadium in Norman, Oklahoma. They are a charter member of the Big 12 Conference.

== Offseason ==
=== Recruiting ===
College recruiting
Name	Hometown	School	Height	Weight	Commit date
			N/A	N/A	
Recruit ratings: No ratings found
Overall recruit ranking: Rivals: 2 247Sports: 1 ESPN: 1
Note: In many cases, Scout, Rivals, 247Sports, On3, and ESPN may conflict in their listings of height and weight.; In these cases, the average was taken. ESPN grades are on a 100-point scale.; Sources: "Rivals commits". Rivals.; "ESPN commits". ESPN.; "2020 Team Ranking". Rivals.com.; "247Sports commits". 247Sports.

=== Transfers ===
Outgoing

Name	No.	Pos.	Height	Weight	Year	Hometown	New school
Trey Sermon	#4	RB	6'0	224	Junior	Marietta, Georgia	Ohio State
Jaquayln Crawford	#17	WR	5'10	175	RS Freshman	Rockdale, Texas	Arkansas
Mykel Jones	#3	WR	5'11	191	RS Junior	Patterson, Louisiana	Tulane
Michael Thompson	#71	OL	6'2	253	RS Freshman	St. Louis, Missouri	
Mark Jackson Jr.	#42	LB	6'1	238	Senior	Cibolo, Texas	TCU
Troy James	#94	DL	6'1	286	RS Sophomore	Baton Rouge, Louisiana	Prairie View A&M
Levi Draper	#30	LB	6'1	245	RS Sophomore	Collinsville, Oklahoma	Arkansas
Jonathan Perkins	#29	LB	6'0	214	Freshman	San Bernardino, California	
Jordan Parker	#1	DB	5'11	180	RS Junior	Pittsburg, California	
Ryan Jones	#21	LB	6'2	236	RS Sophomore	Charlotte, North Carolina	East Carolina
Ty DeArman	#27	S	5'11	191	Freshman	Arlington, Texas	SMU
Starrland Baldwin	#12	CB	5'11	161	Sophomore	Houston, Texas	Laney College
Miguel Edwards	#16	DB	5'11	173	Sophomore	Deerfield Beach, Florida	Independence C.C.

Incoming

Name	No.	Pos.	Height	Weight	Year	Hometown	Prev. school
Theo Howard	#2	WR	6'0	182	RS Senior	Westlake Village, California	UCLA
Obi Obialo	#82	WR	6'3	214	Senior	Coppell, Texas	Marshall
Cason Grant	#83	WR	5'11	180	RS Sophomore	Abilene, Texas	Mississippi State
Chris Murray	#66	OG	6'2	298	Junior	Palmdale, California	UCLA

=== 2020 NFL draft ===
==== Team players drafted into the NFL ====
Player	Position	Round	Pick	NFL team
CeeDee Lamb	WR	1	17	Dallas Cowboys
Kenneth Murray	ILB	1	23	Los Angeles Chargers
Jalen Hurts	QB	2	53	Philadelphia Eagles
Neville Gallimore	DT	3	82	Dallas Cowboys

== Preseason ==
=== Award watch lists ===
Listed in the order that they were released

Award	Player	Position	Year

=== Big 12 media days ===
The Big 12 media days were held on July 21–22, 2020 in a virtual format due to the COVID-19 pandemic.

=== Big 12 media poll ===
Big 12 media poll
Predicted finish	Team	Votes (1st place)
1	Oklahoma	80
2	Oklahoma State	6
3	Texas	4
4	Iowa State	
5	Baylor	
6	TCU	
7	Kansas State	
8	West Virginia	
9	Texas Tech	
10	Kansas	

=== Preseason awards ===
2020 Preseason All-Big 12

== Schedule ==
=== Spring Game ===
The 2020 Oklahoma Spring Game was set to take place on April 18, 2020, but was canceled on March 18, 2020, due to the COVID-19 pandemic.

=== Regular season ===
Oklahoma announced a revised 2020 football schedule on August 12, 2020, The 2020 schedule consists of 5 home games, 4 away games and 1 neutral-site game in the regular season. The Sooners will host 1 non-conference game against Missouri State. Oklahoma will host Baylor, Oklahoma State in the Bedlam Series, Kansas, Kansas State, and travel to Iowa State, TCU, Texas Tech, and West Virginia in regular-season conference play. Oklahoma will play Texas in Dallas, Texas at the Cotton Bowl Stadium on October 10 in the Red River Showdown, the 115th game played in the series.

The Sooners had games scheduled against Army, Tennessee and West Virginia, which were canceled due to the COVID-19 pandemic.

Date	Time	Opponent	Rank	Site	TV	Result	Attendance
September 12	6:00 p.m.	Missouri State*	No. 5	Gaylord Family Oklahoma Memorial Stadium; Norman, OK	FSOK PPV	W 48–0	22,700
September 26	11:00 a.m.	Kansas State	No. 3	Gaylord Family Oklahoma Memorial Stadium; Norman, OK	FOX	L 35–38	22,700
October 3	6:30 p.m.	at Iowa State	No. 18	Jack Trice Stadium; Ames, IA	ABC	L 30–37	13,724
October 10	11:00 a.m.	vs. No. 22 Texas		Cotton Bowl; Dallas, TX (Red River Showdown)	FOX	W 53–45 ^{4OT}	24,000
October 24	11:00 a.m.	at TCU		Amon G. Carter Stadium; Fort Worth, TX	ABC	W 33–14	12,440
October 31	7:00 p.m.	at Texas Tech	No. 24	Jones AT&T Stadium; Lubbock, TX	FOX	W 62–28	14,431
November 7	2:30 p.m.	Kansas	No. 19	Gaylord Family Oklahoma Memorial Stadium; Norman, OK	ESPN	W 62–9	22,700
November 21	6:30 p.m.	No. 14 Oklahoma State	No. 18	Gaylord Family Oklahoma Memorial Stadium; Norman, OK (Bedlam Series/College GameDay)	ABC	W 41–13	22,700
December 5	7:00 p.m.	Baylor	No. 11	Gaylord Family Oklahoma Memorial Stadium; Norman, OK	FOX	W 27–14	22,700
December 19	11:00 a.m.	vs. No. 6 Iowa State	No. 10	AT&T Stadium; Arlington, TX (Big 12 Championship Game)	ABC	W 27–21	18,720
December 30	7:15 p.m.	vs. No. 7 Florida*	No. 6	AT&T Stadium; Arlington, TX (Cotton Bowl Classic)	ESPN	W 55–20	17,323
*Non-conference game; Rankings from AP Poll and CFP Rankings (after November 24) released prior to game; All times are in Central time

== Personnel ==
=== Roster ===
2020 Oklahoma Sooners Football
Quarterback: 4 Chandler Morris – freshman (5'11, 175); 6 Cade Horton – freshman (6'1, 203); 7 Spencer Rattler – (redshirt) freshman (6'1, 205); 9 Tanner Schafer – (redshirt) senior (6'3, 217); 13 Colt Atkinson – (redshirt) junior (6'0, 171); 15 Tanner Mordecai – (redshirt) sophomore (6'2, 211); Running back: 1 Seth McGowan – freshman (5'11, 211); 3 Mikey Henderson – freshman (6'2, 234) (FB+); 5 T.J. Pledger – junior (5'9, 193); 23 Todd Hudson – (redshirt) freshman (5'5, 188); 24 Marcus Major – (redshirt) freshman (5'11, 224); 25 Jaden Knowles – junior (5'7, 191); 27 Jeremiah Hall – (redshirt) junior (6'2, 253) (FB+); 29 Rhamondre Stevenson – senior (6'0, 246); 49 Dane Saltarelli – (redshirt) sophomore (6'3, 245) (FB+); 81 Brayden Willis – junior (6'3, 236) (FB+); Wide receiver: 2 Theo Howard – (redshirt) senior (6'0, 182); 8 Trejan Bridges – sophomore (6'1, 180); 10 Theo Wease – sophomore (6'3, 192); 11 Jadon Haselwood – sophomore (6'2, 200); 12 Drake Stoops – (redshirt) sophomore (5'9, 190); 14 Charleston Rambo – (redshirt) junior (6'1, 175); 16 Brian Darby – freshman (6'0, 204); 17 Marvin Mims – freshman (5'11, 177); 19 Trevon West – freshman (6'0, 175); 21 Marcellus Crutchfield – freshman (6'0, 183); 82 Obi Obialo – (redshirt) senior (6'3, 218); 83 Cason Grant – (redshirt) sophomore (6'0, 178); 84 Kyre Richardson – (redshirt) junior (6'2, 180); 85 Devin Staton – (redshirt) sophomore (6'2, 204); 86 Finn Corwin – (redshirt) freshman (5'8, 183); 87 Spencer Jones – (redshirt) senior (6'1, 197); 88 Greydon Williams – freshman (6'2, 191); 89 Damon Smith – (redshirt) freshman (6'1, 190); Tight end: 18 Austin Stogner – sophomore (6'6, 262); 31 Jackson Sumlin – freshman (6'2, 239); 80 Jalin Conyers – freshman (6'4, 228); Long snapper: 51 Kasey Kelleher – (redshirt) junior (5'10, 234); 58 Ethan Lane – freshman (6'0, 247)	Offensive line: 52 Tyrese Robinson – OG – (redshirt) junior (6'3, 335); 53 Anton Harrison – OT – freshman (6'5, 334); 54 Marquis Hayes – OG – (redshirt) junior (6'5, 349); 55 Aaryn Parks – OL – freshman (6'5, 322); 56 Creed Humphrey – C – (redshirt) junior (6'5, 320); 59 Adrian Ealy – OT – (redshirt) junior (6'6, 327); 61 Ian McIver – OL – (redshirt) junior (6'3, 315); 62 Nate Anderson – OL – freshman (6'4, 281); 64 Ben Tawwater – OL – freshman (6'3, 288); 65 Finley Felix – OL – senior (6'5, 298); 66 Chris Murray – OG – junior (6'3, 297); 68 Ayden Visage – OL – freshman (6'3, 307); 70 Brey Walker – OG – (redshirt) sophomore (6'6, 342); 71 Noah Nelson – OL – freshman (6'7, 317); 72 Stacey Wilkins – (redshirt) freshman (6'6, 316); 73 Andrew Raym – OG – freshman (6'3, 320); 74 Marcus Alexander – OL – (redshirt) freshman (6'3, 322); 75 E.J. Ndoma–Ogar – OL – (redshirt) freshman (6'3, 333); 76 Dalton Bishop – C – (redshirt) junior (6'5, 295); 77 Erik Swenson – OT – (redshirt) senior (6'5, 326); 79 Darrell Simpson – OT – (redshirt) sophomore (6'7, 369); Defensive line: 7 Ronnie Perkins – DE – junior (6'3, 247); 8 Perrion Winfrey – DT – junior (6'3, 297); 14 Reggie Grimes II – DE – freshman (6'4, 266); 33 Marcus Stripling – DE – sophomore (6'3, 250); 42 Noah Arinze – DL – freshman (6'5, 252); 88 Jordan Kelley – DT – (redshirt) sophomore (6'3, 292); 90 Josh Ellison – DT – sophomore (6'2, 291); 92 Kori Roberson – DL – (redshirt) freshman (6'4, 288); 93 Reed Lindsey – DL – (redshirt) freshman (6'4, 255); 95 Isaiah Thomas – DE – (redshirt) junior (6'5, 267); 96 LaRon Stokes – DL – senior (6'4, 278); 98 Zacchaeus McKinney – DT – (redshirt) junior (6'3, 272); 99 Marcus Hicks – DL – (redshirt) freshman (6'5, 284)	Linebacker: 2 David Ugwoegbu – sophomore (6'4, 251); 3 Jamal Morris – (redshirt) freshman (6'2, 210); 11 Nik Bonitto – OLB – (redshirt) sophomore (6'3, 238); 19 Caleb Kelly – (redshirt) senior (6'3, 232); 20 Robert Barnes – (redshirt) junior (6'2, 232); 23 DaShaun White – junior (6'0, 227); 24 Brian Asamoah II – (redshirt) sophomore (6'1, 230); 30 Brynden Walker – freshman (6'2, 251); 35 Shane Whitter – freshman (6'0, 230); 36 Josh Schenck – (redshirt) senior (5'11, 226); 37 Easton Reeves – (redshirt) freshman (6'1, 230); 38 Bryan Mead – (redshirt) senior (6'2, 226); 40 Jon-Michael Terry – OLB – (redshirt) senior (6'3, 245); 41 Jake McCoy – (redshirt) freshman (6'2, 225); 45 Joseph Wete – OLB – (redshirt) freshman (6'4, 233); 50 Hayes Bufkin – freshman (6'0, 216); Defensive back: 1 Joshua Eaton – CB – freshman (6'2, 175); 4 Jaden Davis – CB – sophomore (5'10, 185); 5 Woodi Washington – S – (redshirt) freshman (5'11, 192); 6 Tre Brown – CB – senior (5'10, 186); 9 D. J. Graham – CB – freshman (5'11, 200); 10 Patrick Fields – S – junior (5'11, 204); 13 Tre Norwood – DB – (redshirt) junior (6'0, 194); 15 Bryson Washington – S – freshman (6'2, 197); 16 Justin Harrington – DB – junior (6'3, 215); 21 Kendall Dennis – CB – freshman (5'11, 181); 22 Jeremiah Criddell – DB – (redshirt) freshman (5'11, 197); 25 Justin Broiles – S – (redshirt) junior (5'10, 190); 26 Caleb Murphy – DB – (redshirt) sophomore (5'11, 210); 28 Chanse Sylvie – CB – (redshirt) senior (6'0, 196); 29 Jaedyn Scott – DB – freshman (6'1, 183); 32 Delarrin Turner-Yell – S – junior (5'10, 195); 34 Eric Gallegos – DB – (redshirt) sophomore (5'9, 189); 39 Doug Collins – DB – (redshirt) sophomore (6'2, 206); 43 Ryan Peoples – CB – (redshirt) sophomore (5'11, 190); 44 Brendan Radley-Hiles – DB – junior (5'9, 180); 46 Hunter Longcrier – DB – (redshirt) sophomore (6'2, 199); 47 Asa Colbert – DB – freshman (5'11, 190); 48 Eric Windham – DB – (redshirt) freshman (5'10, 193); 49 Pierce Hudgens – DB – freshman (6'1, 195); Placekicker: 39 Stephen Johnson – (redshirt) junior (6'1, 186); 47 Gabe Brkic – (redshirt) sophomore (6'2, 198) (+P); Punter: 34 Zach Schmit – freshman (5'11, 165) (+K); 46 Reeves Mundschau – (redshirt) junior (5'11, 183)

== Coaching staff ==
Name	Position	Alma mater	Joined staff
Lincoln Riley	Head coach / quarterbacks	Texas Tech (2006)	2015/2017
Alex Grinch	Defensive coordinator / Safeties	Mount Union (2002)	2019
Jamar Cain	Outside linebackers / Defensive Ends	New Mexico State (2002)	2020
Shane Beamer	Assistant head coach for offense / tight ends and H-Backs	Virginia Tech (1999)	2018
Cale Gundy	Co-offensive coordinator / recruiting coordinator / inside receivers	Oklahoma (1994)	1999
Bill Bedenbaugh	Co-offensive coordinator / offensive line	Iowa Wesleyan (1995)	2013
Roy Manning	Cornerbacks	Michigan (2004)	2019
DeMarco Murray	Running backs	Oklahoma (2010)	2020
Brian Odom	Inside Linebackers	SE Oklahoma State (2004)	2019
Dennis Simmons	Associate head coach / outside receivers	BYU (1997)	2015
Calvin Thibodeaux	Defensive line	Oklahoma (2006)	2016

=== Depth chart ===
Defense

FS
Pat Fields
Justin Broiles
Bryson Washington
--

NB	MIKE	WILL	RUSH
Brendan Radley-Hiles	DaShaun White	Brian Asamoah II	Nik Bonitto
Jeremiah Cridell	David Ugwoegbu	Bryan Mead	Jon-Michael Terry
--	Robert Barnes	Shane Whitter; Jamal Morris	Joseph Wete; Brynden Walker

SS
Delarrin Turner-Yell
Woodi Washington
--

CB
Jaden Davis
Tre Norwood
--

DE	NT	DE
LaRon Stokes	Perrion Winfrey	Ronnie Perkins
Josh Ellison	Kori Roberson	Isaiah Thomas; Marcus Stripling
--	Jordan Kelley	Reggie Grimes II

CB
Tre Brown
Joshua Eaton
D. J. Graham
Kendall Dennis

Offense

WR
Theo Wease
Theo Howard
Trejan Bridges
--
--

WR
Obi Obialo
Drake Stoops
--

LT	LG	C	RG	RT
Anton Harrison	Marquis Hayes	Creed Humphrey	Tyrese Robinson	Adrian Ealy
Stacey Wilkins	Andrew Raym	Ian McIver	Brey Walker	Erik Swenson
--	--	--	--	--

TE
Austin Stogner
Brayden Willis
Jeremiah Hall
--
--

WR
Charleston Rambo
Marvin Mims
--

QB
Spencer Rattler
Tanner Mordecai
Chandler Morris

Special teams
PK Gabe Brkic
Stephen Johnson
P Reeves Mundschau
Zach Schmit
KR Tre Brown
Marvin Mims
PR Marvin Mims
Charleston Rambo
LS Kasey Kelleher
Hunter Longcrier
H Spencer Jones
Reeves Mundschau

RB
T.J. Pledger
Marcus Major
Rhamondre Stevenson
Seth McGowan

== Game summaries ==
=== Vs. Missouri State ===
Missouri State Bears (0–0) vs. #5 Oklahoma Sooners (0–0)

Quarter	1	2	3	4	Total
Missouri State	0	0	0	0	0
No. 5 Oklahoma	31	10	0	7	48

at Gaylord Family Oklahoma Memorial Stadium • Norman, OK

- Date: Saturday, September 12, 2020
- Game time: 6:04 p.m. CDT
- Game weather: HazyTemperature: 78
- Game attendance: 22,700
- Referee: David Alvarez
- TV announcers (FOX PPV): Chad McKee (play-by-play), Chuck Long (analyst) & C.T. Steckel (sideline)

Game information

First Quarter

- (11:24) OKLA – Seth McGowan 1 yard rush, Seth Johnson kick (Drive: 5 plays, 58 yards, 2:13; OU 7–0)
- (9:48) OKLA – Spencer Rattler 58 yard pass to Marvin Mims, Seth Johnson kick (Drive: 1 plays, 58 yards, 0:10; OU 14-0)
- (6:16) OKLA – Spencer Rattler 53 yard pass to Charleston Rambo, Seth Johnson kick (Drive: 5 plays, 65 yards, 2:40; OU 21–0)
- (4:28) OKLA – Spencer Rattler 37 yard pass to Seth McGowan, Seth Johnson kick (Drive: 1 plays, 37 yards, 0:11; OU 28–0)
- (1:22) OKLA – Seth Johnson 42 yard field goal (Drive: 4 plays,3 yards, 1:29; (OU 31–0)

Second Quarter

- (11:10) OKLA – Seth Johnson 22 yard field goal (Drive: 7 plays, 51 yards, 3:41; OU 34–0)
- (5:37) OKLA – Spencer Rattler 15 yard pass to Charleston Rambo, Seth Johnson kick (Drive: 6 plays, 52 yards, 3:19; (OU 41–0)

Third Quarter

Fourth Quarter

- (14:20) OKLA – Tanner Mordecai 16 yard pass to Finn Corwin, Seth Johnson kick (Drive: 3 plays, 21 yards, 1:32; OU 48–0)

Statistics	MOST	OKLA
First downs	7	27
Total yards	135	608
Rushes/yards	24–54	35–124
Passing yards	27–72	102–136
Passing: Comp–Att–Int	10–22-1	30–36–1
Time of possession	22:49	37:11

Team	Category	Player	Statistics
Missouri State	Passing	Jaden Johnson	9–19, 72 yards, 1 INT
Missouri State	Rushing	Tarrel Roberts	1 carries, 26 yards
Missouri State	Receiving	Lorenzo Thomas	4 receptions, 46 yards
Oklahoma	Passing	Spencer Rattler	14–17, 290 yards, 4 TD
Oklahoma	Rushing	Seth McGowan	9 carries, 61 yards, 1 TD
Oklahoma	Receiving	Theo Howard	5 receptions, 63 yards

=== Vs. Kansas State ===
Kansas State Wildcats (0–1) vs. #3 Oklahoma Sooners (1–0)

Quarter	1	2	3	4	Total
Kansas State	0	7	14	17	38
No. 3 Oklahoma	7	14	14	0	35

at Gaylord Family Oklahoma Memorial Stadium • Norman, OK

- Date: Saturday, September 26, 2020
- Game time: 11:00 a.m. CDT
- Game weather: • Temperature:
- Game attendance: 22,700
- Referee: Brad Van Vark
- TV announcers (FOX): Gus Johnson (Play-by-Play), Joel Klatt (analyst), Jenny Taft (sideline)

Game information

First Quarter

- (5:29) OKLA – Spencer Rattler 11 yard pass to Marvin Mims, Gabe Brkic kick (Drive: 11 plays, 83 yards, 4:37; OU 7-0)

Second Quarter

- (14:50) OKLA – Spencer Rattler 32 yard pass to Drake Stoops, Gabe Brkic kick (Drive: 9 plays, 74 yards, 3:57; OU 14-0)
- (5:10) KSU – Skylar Thompson 39 yard pass to Chabastin Taylor, Blake Lynch kick (Drive: 9 plays, 65 yards, 4:37; OU 14-7)
- (0:44) OKLA – Spencer Rattler 9 yard pass to Marvin Mims, Gabe Brkic kick (Drive: 10 plays, 75 yards, 4:26; OU 21-7)

Third Quarter

- (6:35) OKLA – Spencer Rattler 21 yard pass to Jeremiah Hall, Gabe Brkic kick (Drive: 5 plays, 87 yards, 1:50; OU 28-7)
- (5:00) KSU – Skylar Thompson 1 yard rush, Blake Lynch kick (Drive: 3 plays, 78 yards, 1:35; OU 28–14)
- (2:46) OKLA – Seth McGowan 5 yard rush, Gabe Brkic kick (Drive: 5 plays, 75 yards, 2:14; OU 35–14)
- (1:36) KSU – Skylar Thompson 2 yard rush, Blake Lynch kick (Drive: 3 plays, 75 yards, 1:10; OU 35–21)

Fourth Quarter

- (12:28) KSU – Skylar Thompson 4 yard rush, Blake Lynch kick (Drive: 8 plays, 38 yards, 3:47; OU 35–28)
- (8:17) KSU – Deuce Vaughn 38 yard rush, Blake Lynch kick (Drive: 2 plays, 38 yards, 3:47; Tied 35–35)
- (4:32) KSU – Blake Lynch 50 yard field goal (Drive: 5 plays, 29 yards, 2:00; KSU 38–35)

Statistics	KSU	OKLA
First downs	10	28
Total yards	400	517
Rushes/yards	26–66	35–130
Passing yards	334	387
Passing: Comp–Att–Int	18–25–0	30–41–3
Time of possession	27:52	32:08

Team	Category	Player	Statistics
Kansas State	Passing	Skylar Thompson	18–25, 334 yards, 1 TD
Kansas State	Rushing	Deuce Vaughn	8 carries, 45 yards, 1 TD
Kansas State	Receiving	Deuce Vaughn	4 receptions, 129 yards
Oklahoma	Passing	Spencer Rattler	30–41, 387 yards, 4 TD, 3 INT
Oklahoma	Rushing	Seth McGowan	13 carries, 73 yards, 1 TD
Oklahoma	Receiving	Drake Stoops	3 receptions, 93 yards, 1 TD

=== At Iowa State ===
#18 Oklahoma Sooners (1–1) vs. Iowa State Cyclones (1–1)

Quarter	1	2	3	4	Total
No. 18 Oklahoma	10	7	3	10	30
Iowa State	3	10	10	14	37

at Jack Trice Stadium • Ames, IA

- Date: Saturday, October 3, 2020
- Game time: 6:46 p.m. CDT
- Game weather: • broken clouds Temperature: 55
- Game attendance: 13,724
- Referee: Michael Vandervelde
- TV announcers (ABC): Sean McDonough (play-by-play), Todd Blackledge (analyst), Todd McShay (field analyst), Molly McGrath (sideline)

Game information

First Quarter

- (11:36) OKLA – Gabe Brkic 18 yard field goal (Drive: 7 plays, 74 yards, 3:24; OU 3–0)
- (08:36) ISU – Connor Assalley 35 yard field goal (Drive: 9 plays, 57 yards, 2:58; Tied (3–3)
- (3:59) OKLA – Spencer Rattler 5 yard rush, Gabe Brkic kick (Drive: 10 plays, 85 yards, 4:33; OU 10–3)

Second Quarter

- (14:45) ISU - Connor Assalley 26 yard field goal (Drive: 11 plays, 63 yards, 4:08; (OU 10–6)
- (11:49) OKLA – Spencer Rattler 4 yard pass to Jeremiah Hall, Gabe Brkic kick (Drive: 7 plays, 67 yards, 2:51; OU 17–6)
- (3:53) ISU - Breece Hall 2 yard rush, Connor Assalley kick (Drive: 6 plays, 85 yards, 3:44; OU 17–13)

Third Quarter

- (8:19) ISU – Connor Assalley 32 yard field goal (Drive: 11 plays, 58 yards,6:32; OU 17–16)
- (2:01) OKLA – Gabe Brkic 33 yard field goal (Drive: 11 plays, 49 yards, 6:01; OU 20–16)
- (1:18) ISU - Brock Purdy 65 yard pass to Xavier Hutchinson, Connor Assalley kick (Drive: 3 plays, 75 yards, 0:43; ISU 23–20)

Fourth Quarter

- (12:48) OKLA - Gabe Brkic 51 yard field goal (Drive: 9 plays, 41 yards, 3:30; Tied 23–23)
- (8:17) OKLA – Spencer Rattler 3 yard pass to Jeremiah Hall, Gabe Brkic kick (Drive: 4 plays, 39 yards, 1:51; OU 30–23)
- (7:26) ISU – Brock Purdy 2 yard rush, Connor Assalley kick (Drive: 2 plays, 13 yards, 0:38; Tied 30–30)
- (4:06) ISU – Breece Hall 8 yard rush, Connor Assalley kick (Drive: 4 plays, 55 yards, 1:56; ISU 37–30)

Statistics	OKLA	ISU
First downs	22	23
Total yards	414	417
Rushes/yards	33–114	31–135
Passing yards	300	282
Passing: Comp–Att–Int	25–36–1	13–25–0
Time of possession	33:34	26:26

Team	Category	Player	Statistics
Oklahoma	Passing	Spencer Rattler	25–36, 300 yards, 2 TD, 1 INT
Oklahoma	Rushing	Seth McGowan	12 carries, 47 yards
Oklahoma	Receiving	Austin Stogner	5 receptions, 74 yards
Iowa State	Passing	Brock Purdy	12–24, 254 yards, 1 TD
Iowa State	Rushing	Breece Hall	28 carries, 139 yards, 2 TD
Iowa State	Receiving	Charlie Kolar	4 receptions, 66 yards

=== Vs. No. 22 Texas ===
#22 Texas Longhorns (2–1) vs. Oklahoma Sooners (1–2)

Quarter	1	2	3	4	OT	2OT	3OT	4OT	Total
No. 22 Texas	0	17	0	14	7	7	0	0	45
Oklahoma	10	7	14	0	7	7	0	8	53

at Cotton Bowl • Dallas, TX

- Date: Saturday, October 10, 2020
- Game time: 11:00 a.m. CDT
- Game weather: •Mostly Sunny Temperature: 75 °F (24 °C), Wind: SE 2 mph (3.2 km/h)
- Game attendance: 24,000
- Referee: Brandon Cruse
- TV announcers (FOX): Gus Johnson, Joel Klatt

Game information

First Quarter

- (9:34) OKLA – Gabe Brkic 19 yard field goal (Drive: 9 plays, 57 yards, 3:17; OU 3-0)
- (6:47) OKLA - Marvin Mims 30 yard pass from Spencer Rattler, Gabe Brkic kick (Drive: 4 plays, 60 yards,1:33; OU 10-0)

Second Quarter

- (13:40) TEX – Cameron Dicker 34 yard field goal (Drive: 4 plays, -5 yards, 1:20; OU 10-3)
- (11:44) TEX – Sam Ehlinger 6 year run, Cameron Dicker kick (Drive: 2 plays, 19 yards, 0:47; Tied 10-10)
- (6:58) OKLA – Marcus Major 7 yard run, Gabe Brkic kick (Drive: 5 plays, 5 yards, 2:07; OU 17-10)
- (4:14) TEX – Sam Ehlinger 2 yard run, Cameron Dicker kick (Drive: 8 plays, 75 yards, 2:44; Tied 17–17)

Third Quarter

- (11:40) OKLA – T.J. Pledger 2 yard run, Gabe Brkic kick (Drive: 3 plays, 30 yards, 1:22; OU 24-17)
- (1:27) OKLA – T.J. Pledger 1 yard run, Gabe Brkic kick (Drive: 17 plays, 87 yards, 8:07; OU 31–17)

Fourth Quarter

- (3:28) TEX – Joshua Moore 9 yard pass from Sam Ehlinger, Cameron Dicker kick (Drive: 4 plays, 50 yards, 1:10; OU 31–24)
- (0:14) TEX – Keaontay Ingram 2 yard pass from Sam Ehlinger, Cameron Dicker kick (Drive: 8 plays, 84 yards, 1:38; Tied 31-31)

Overtime

- (0:00) TEX – Sam Ehlinger 3 yard run, Cameron Dicker kick (Drive: 5 plays, 25 yards; UT 37–31)
- (0:00) OKLA – Austin Stogner 11 yard pass from Spencer Rattler, Gabe Brkic kick (Drive: 5 plays, 25 yards; Tied 37-37)

2nd Overtime

- (0:00) OKLA – Spencer Rattler 1 yard run, Gabe Brkic kick (Drive: 5 plays, 25 yards; OU 45–38)
- (0:00) TEX – Sam Ehlinger 25 yard run, Cameron Dicker kick (Drive: 2 plays, 25 yards; Tied 45-45)

3rd Overtime

- No Score

4th Overtime

- (0:00) OKLA – Drake Stoops 25 yard pass from Spencer Rattler, Theo Wease 2pt conversion pass from Spencer Rattler (Drive: 2 plays, 25 yards; OU 53–45)

Statistics	TEX	OKLA
First downs	27	30
Total yards	428	469
Rushes/yards	34–141	55–208
Passing yards	287	261
Passing: Comp–Att–Int	30–52–2	28–42–1
Time of possession	23:56	36:04

Team	Category	Player	Statistics
Texas	Passing	Sam Ehlinger	30–53, 287 yards, 2 TD, 2 INT
Texas	Rushing	Sam Ehlinger	23 carries, 112 yards, 4 TD
Texas	Receiving	Joshua Moore	8 receptions, 83 yards, 1 TD
Oklahoma	Passing	Spencer Rattler	23–35, 209 yards, 3 TD, 1 INT
Oklahoma	Rushing	T. J. Pledger	22 carries, 131 yards, 2 TD
Oklahoma	Receiving	Austin Stogner	6 receptions, 56 yard, 1 TD

=== At TCU ===
Oklahoma Sooners (2–2) vs. TCU Horned Frogs (1–2)

Quarter	1	2	3	4	Total
Oklahoma	10	7	10	6	33
TCU	0	7	0	7	14

at Amon G. Carter Stadium • Fort Worth, TX

- Date: Saturday, October 24, 2020
- Game time: 11:00 a.m. CDT
- Game weather: • SunnyTemperature: 45 °F (7 °C)
- Game attendance: 12,440
- Referee: David Alvarez
- TV announcers (ABC): Joe Tessitore (play-by-play), Greg McElroy (analyst) & Holly Rowe (sideline)

Game information

First Quarter

- (11:57) OKLA – T. J. Pledger 12 yard rush, Gabe Brkic kick (Drive: 6 plays, 73 yards, 2:57; OU 7–0)
- (5:36) OKLA – Gabe Brkic 40 yard field goal (Drive: 8 plays, 60 yards, 3:07; OU 10–0)

Second Quarter

- (13:40) OKLA – Spencer Rattler 50 yard pass to Marvin Mims, Gabe Brkic kick (Drive: 5 plays, 72 yards, 1:59; OU 17–0)
- (9:38) TCU – Daimarqua Foster 6 yard rush, Griffin Kell kick (Drive: 8 plays, 75 yards, 4:02; OU 17–7)

Third Quarter

- (7:19) OKLA – Gabe Brkic 22 yard field goal (Drive: 10 plays, 61 yards, 5:36; OU 20–7)
- (1:57) OKLA – Spencer Rattler 61 yard pass to Marvin Mims, Gabe Brkic kick (Drive: 4 plays, 93 yards, 1:49; OU 27–7)

Fourth Quarter

- (10:50) OKLA – Gabe Brkic 32 yard field goal (Drive: 8 plays, 23 yards, 4:30; OU 30–7)
- (3:42) TCU – Max Duggan 11 yard pass to Pro Wells, Kell Griffin kick (Drive: 7 plays 82 yards, 2:35; OU 30–14)
- (0:26) OKLA – Gabe Brkic 30 yard field goal (Drive: 8 plays, 49 yards, 3:14; OU 33–14)

Statistics	OKLA	TCU
First downs	23	18
Total yards	498	351
Rushes/yards	45–166	25–75
Passing yards	332	276
Passing: Comp–Att–Int	13–22–0	25–35–0
Time of possession	33:17	26:43

Team	Category	Player	Statistics
Oklahoma	Passing	Spencer Rattler	13–22, 332 yards, 2 TD
Oklahoma	Rushing	T. J. Pledger	22 carries, 129 yards, 1 TD
Oklahoma	Receiving	Marvin Mims	4 receptions, 132 yards, 2 TD
TCU	Passing	Max Duggan	25–35, 276 yards, 1 TD
TCU	Rushing	Daimarqua Foster	5 carries, 21 yards, 1 TD
TCU	Receiving	Taye Barber	6 receptions, 70 yards

=== At Texas Tech ===
#24 Oklahoma Sooners (3–2) vs. Texas Tech Red Raiders (2–3)

Quarter	1	2	3	4	Total
No. 24 Oklahoma	21	27	7	7	62
Texas Tech	7	7	0	14	28

at Jones AT&T Stadium • Lubbock, TX

- Date: Saturday, October 31, 2020
- Game time: 7:00 p.m. CDT
- Game weather: Temperature: 70 °F (21 °C) • weather: partly cloudy • wind: N 8 MPH
- Game attendance: 14,431
- Referee: Scott Campbell
- TV announcers (FOX): Tim Brando (play-by-play) & Spencer Tillman (analyst)

Game information

First Quarter

- (12:20) TTU – SaRodorick Thompson 5 yard rush, Trey Wolff kick (Drive: 7 plays, 75 yards, 2:40; TTU 7–0)
- (5:31) OKLA – Rhamondre Stevenson 6 yard rush, Gabe Brkic kick (Drive: 7 plays, 56 yards, 3:19; Tied 7–7)
- (5:04) OKLA – T. J. Pledger 2 yard rush, Gabe Brkic kick (Drive: 1 play, 9 yards, 0:10; OU 14–7)
- (2:10) OKLA – Rhamondre Stevenson 1 yard rush, Gabe Brkic kick (Drive: 3 plays, 50 yards, 0:58; OU 21–7)

Second Quarter

- (14:06) OKLA – Spencer Rattler 4 yard pass to Jeremiah Hall, Gabe Brkic kick (Drive: 5 plays, 25 yards, 2:36; OU 28–7)
- (12:05) OKLA – Spencer Rattler 27 yard pass to Austin Stogner, Gabe Brkic kick (Drive: 3 plays, 62 yards, 1:09; OU 35–7)
- (6:28) OKLA – Rhamondre Stevenson 1 yard rush, Gabe Brkic kick (Drive: 6 plays, 80 yards, 3:24; OU 42–7)
- (6:15) TTU – Henry Colombi 75 yard pass to Travis Koontz, Trey Wolff kick (Drive: 1 play, 75 yards, 0:13; OU 42–14)
- (1:42) OKLA – Gabe Brkic 25 yard field goal (Drive: 6 plays, 42 yards, 2:56; OU 45–14)
- (0:00) OKLA – Gabe Brkic 35 yard field goal (Drive: 10 plays, 49 yards, 1:17; OU 48–14)

Third Quarter

- (10:17) OKLA – Mikey Henderson 4 yard rush, Gabe Brkic kick (Drive: 9 plays, 75 yards, 4:43; OU 55–14)

Fourth Quarter

- (12:52) TTU – Henry Colombi 10 yard pass to Ja'Lynn Polk, Trey Wolff kick (Drive: 6 plays, 46 yards, 2:25; OU 55–21)
- (7:51) OKLA – Seth McGowan 14 yard rush, Gabe Brkic kick (Drive: 9 plays, 75 yards, 5:01; OU 62–21)
- (5:05) TTU – Chadarius Townsend 36 yard rush, Trey Wolff kick (Drive: 7 plays, 75 yards, 2:46; OU 62–28)

Statistics	OKLA	TTU
First downs	29	18
Total yards	559	400
Rushes/yards	39–213	29–134
Passing yards	346	266
Passing: Comp–Att–Int	27–38–0	19–32–2
Time of possession	36:23	23:37

Team	Category	Player	Statistics
Oklahoma	Passing	Spencer Rattler	21–30, 288 yards, 2 TD
Oklahoma	Rushing	Rhamondre Stevenson	13 carries, 87 yards, 3 TD
Oklahoma	Receiving	Theo Wease	5 receptions, 105 yards
Texas Tech	Passing	Henry Colombi	15–28, 227 yards, 2 TD, 2 INT
Texas Tech	Rushing	Chadarius Townsend	6 carries, 68 yards, 1 TD
Texas Tech	Receiving	Erik Ezukanma	7 receptions, 88 yards

=== Vs. Kansas ===
Kansas Jayhawks (0–6) vs. #19 Oklahoma Sooners (4–2)

Quarter	1	2	3	4	Total
Kansas	0	3	0	6	9
No.19 Oklahoma	14	17	10	21	62

at Gaylord Family Oklahoma Memorial Stadium • Norman, OK

- Date: Saturday, November 7, 2020
- Game time: 2:30 p.m. CST
- Game weather: Sunny • Temperature: 75 °F (24 °C) • Wind: SSE 14 miles per hour (23 km/h)
- Game attendance: 22,700
- Referee: Kevin Mar
- TV announcers (ESPN): Anish Shroff (play-by-play), Tom Luginbill (analysts) & Kris Budden (sideline)

Game information

First Quarter

- (12:01) OKLA – Spencer Rattler 20 yard pass to Austin Stogner, Gabe Brkic kick (Drive: 3 plays, 45 yards, 1:08; OU 7-0)
- (1:26) OKLA – Rhamondre Stevenson 13 yard rush, Gabe Brkic kick (Drive: 10 plays, 59 yards, 4:20; OU 14-0)

Second Quarter

- (8:13) OKLA – Spencer Rattler 2 yard rush, Gabe Brkic kick (Drive: 5 plays, 76 yards, 2:49; OU 21-0)
- (4:48) OKLA – Gabe Brkic 40 yard field goal (Drive: 5 plays, 3 yards, 1:53; OU 24-0)
- (1:26) OKLA – T. J. Pledger 4 yard rush, Gabe Brkic kick (Drive: 6 plays, 57 yards, 2:26; OU 31-0)
- (0:00) KAN – Jacob Borcila 32 yard field goal (Drive: 8 plays, 47 yards, 1:26; OU 31-3)

Third Quarter

- (11:16) OKLA – Gabe Brkic 50 yard field goal (Drive: 9 plays, 42 yards, 3:44; OU 34-3)
- (8:59) OKLA – Rhamondre Stevenson 29 yard rush, Gabe Brkic kick (Drive: 5 plays, 53 yards, 1:17; OU 41-3)

Fourth Quarter

- (14:54) OKLA – Tanner Mordecai 14 yard pass to Marvin Mims, Gabe Brkic kick (Drive: 4 plays, 56 yards, 1:07; OU 48-3)
- (11:21) OKLA – Marcus Major 3 yard rush, Gabe Brkic kick (Drive: 5 plays, 70 yards, 1:57; OU 55-3)
- (7:50) OKLA – Chandler Morris 13 yard rush, Gabe Brkic kick (Drive: 4 plays, 30 yards, 1:35; OU 62-3)
- (0:00) KAN – Miles Kendrick 20 yard pass to Will Huggins (Drive: 15 plays, 75 yards, 7:50; OU 62-9)

Statistics	KAN	OKLA
First downs	16	31
Total yards	246	540
Rushes/yards	42–95	31–200
Passing yards	151	340
Passing: Comp–Att–Int	14–35–2	22–36–1
Time of possession	32:48	27:12

Team	Category	Player	Statistics
Kansas	Passing	Jalon Daniels	11–31, 115 yards, 2 INT
Kansas	Rushing	Daniel Hishaw Jr.	10 carries, 73 yards
Kansas	Receiving	Luke Grimm	4 receptions, 61 yards
Oklahoma	Passing	Spencer Rattler	15–27, 212 yards, 1 TD, 1 INT
Oklahoma	Rushing	Rhamondre Stevenson	11 carries, 104 yards, 2 TD
Oklahoma	Receiving	Austin Stogner	3 receptions, 75 yards, 1 TD

=== Vs. No. 14 Oklahoma State ===
#14 Oklahoma State Cowboys (5–1) vs. #18 Oklahoma Sooners (5–2)

Quarter	1	2	3	4	Total
No. 14 Oklahoma State	7	6	0	0	13
No. 18 Oklahoma	21	6	0	14	41

at Gaylord Family Oklahoma Memorial Stadium • Norman, OK

- Date: Saturday, November 21, 2020
- Game time: 6:30p.m. CST
- Game weather: • Temperature:
- TV announcers (ABC): Chris Fowler (play-by-play), Kirk Herbstreit (analyst) & Holly Rowe (sideline)

Game information

First Quarter

- (12:37) OKLA – Spencer Rattler 9 yard rush, Gabe Brkic kick (Drive: 6 plays, 75 yards, 2:23; OU 7-0)
- (8:26) OKLA – Spencer Rattler 20 yard pass to Mikey Henderson, Gabe Brkic kick (Drive: 6 plays, 74 yards, 3:13; OU 14-0)
- (6:09) OKLA – Spencer Rattler 9 yard pass to Theo Wease, Gabe Brkic kick (Drive: 4 plays, 20 yards, 1:44; OU 21-0)
- (2:03) OKST – Shane Illingworth 15 yard pass to Logan Carter, Brady Pohl kick (Drive: 11 plays, 75 yards, 4:06; OU 21-7)

Second Quarter

- (13:33) OKLA – Gabe Brkic 40 yard field goal (Drive: 9 plays, 52 yards, 3:30; OU 24-7)
- (8:39) OKLA – Gabe Brkic 29 yard field goal (Drive: 8 plays, 52 yards, 4:22; OU 27-7)
- (4:57) OKST – Brady Pohl 38 yard field goal (Drive: 8 plays, 56 yards, 3:42; OU 27-10)
- (1:38) OKST – Brady Pohl 37 yard field goal (Drive: 6 plays, 44 yards, 2:11; OU 27-13)

Third Quarter

No scoring

Fourth Quarter

- (14:15) OKLA – Spencer Rattler 30 yard pass to Jeremiah Hall, Gabe Brkic kick (Drive: 6 plays, 80 yards, 2:47; OU 34-13)
- (6:28) OKLA – Spencer Rattler 31 yard pass to Theo Wease, Gabe Brkic kick (Drive: 9 plays, 99 yards, 5:42; OU 41-13)

Statistics	OKST	OKLA
First downs	19	23
Total yards	246	492
Rushes/yards	28–78	44–191
Passing yards	168	301
Passing: Comp–Att–Int	15–40–1	17–24–0
Time of possession	25:08	34:52

Team	Category	Player	Statistics
Oklahoma State	Passing	Spencer Sanders	10–19, 97 yards, 1 INT
Oklahoma State	Rushing	Chuba Hubbard	8 carries, 44 yards
Oklahoma State	Receiving	Tylan Wallace	4 receptions, 68 yards
Oklahoma	Passing	Spencer Rattler	17–24, 301 yards, 4 TD
Oklahoma	Rushing	Rhamondre Stevenson	26 carries, 141 yards
Oklahoma	Receiving	Marvin Mims	3 receptions, 65 yards

=== Vs. Baylor ===
Baylor Bears (2–5) vs. #11 Oklahoma Sooners (6–2)

Quarter	1	2	3	4	Total
Baylor	0	0	7	7	14
Oklahoma	3	7	7	10	27

at Gaylord Family Oklahoma Memorial Stadium • Norman, OK

- Date: Saturday, December 5, 2020
- Game time: 7:00 p.m. CST
- Game weather: • Temperature:
- TV announcers (Fox): Tim Brando (play-by-play) & Spencer Tillman (analyst)

Game information

First Quarter

- (10:11) OKLA – Gabe Brkic 20 yard field goal (Drive: 10 plays, 72 yards, 4:49; OU 3-0)

Second Quarter

- (1:04) OKLA – Rhamondre Stevenson 3 yard rush, Gabe Brkic kick (Drive: 4 plays, 31 yards, 1:42; OU 10-0)

Third Quarter

- (10:08) OKLA – Spencer Rattler 9 yard pass to Theo Wease, Gabe Brkic kick (Drive: 5 plays, 52 yards, 2:50; OU 17-0)
- (4:50) BAY – Charlie Brewer 25 yard pass to Tyquan Thornton, John Mayers kick (Drive: 12 plays, 71 yards, 5:18; OU 17-7)

Fourth Quarter

- (13:30) OKLA – Gabe Brkic 50 yard field goal (Drive: 5 plays, 24 yards, 2:53; OU 20-7)
- (5:17) OKLA – Spencer Rattler 8 yard pass to Brayden Willis, Gabe Brkic kick (Drive: 13 plays, 80 yards, 6:23; OU 27-7)
- (0:59) BAY – Charlie Brewer 2 yard rush, John Mayers kick (Drive: 17 plays, 96 yards, 4:18; OU 27-14)

Statistics	BAY	OKLA
First downs	19	16
Total yards	288	269
Rushes/yards	25–26	31–76
Passing yards	263	193
Passing: Comp–Att–Int	30–56–2	20–28–1
Time of possession	29:50	30:10

Team	Category	Player	Statistics
Baylor	Passing	Charlie Brewer	30–56, 263 yards, 1 TD, 1 INT
Baylor	Rushing	Jonah White	3 carries, 18 yards
Baylor	Receiving	Jonah White	9 receptions, 63 yards
Oklahoma	Passing	Spencer Rattler	20–28, 193 yards, 2 TD, 1 INT
Oklahoma	Rushing	Rhamondre Stevenson	15 carries, 50 yards, 1 TD
Oklahoma	Receiving	Theo Wease	5 receptions, 66 yards, 1 TD

=== 2020 Big XII Championship vs. No. 6 Iowa State ===
#10 Oklahoma Sooners (7–2) vs. #6 Iowa State Cyclones (8–2)

Quarter	1	2	3	4	Total
No. 10 Oklahoma	7	17	0	3	27
No. 6 Iowa State	0	7	7	7	21

at AT&T Stadium • Arlington, TX

- Date: Saturday, December 19, 2020
- Game time: 11:00 a.m. CDT
- Game weather: Indoors
- Game attendance: 18,720
- TV announcers (ABC): Sean McDonough (play-by-play), Todd Blackledge (analyst), Todd McShay (reporter) and Allison Williams (reporter)

Game information

First Quarter

- (12:05) OKLA – Chandler Morris 2 yard rush, Gabe Brkic kick (7 plays, 65 yards, 2:55; OU 7–0)

Second Quarter

- (14:52) OKLA – Spencer Rattler 45 yard pass to Marvin Mims, Gabe Brkic kick (5 plays, 74 yards, 1:35; OU 14–0)
- (8:35) OKLA – Gabe Brkic 54 yard field goal (4 plays, 3 yards, 1:20; OU 17–0)
- (1:24) ISU – Brock Purdy 10 yard pass to Charlie Kolar, Connor Assalley kick (6 plays, 66 yards, 2:18; OU 17–7)
- (0:37) OKLA – Spencer Rattler 9 yard Run, Gabe Brkic kick (4 plays, 45 yards, 0:57; OU 24–7)

Third Quarter

- (0:12) ISU – Breece Hall 1 yard rush, Connor Assalley kick (9 plays, 90 yards, 4:29; OU 24–14)

Fourth Quarter

- (5:15) ISU – Breece Hall 3 yard rush, Connor Assalley kick (12 plays, 87 yards, 4:20; OU 24–21)
- (2:01) OU – Gabe Brkic 32 yard field goal (9 plays, 41 yards, 3:14; OU 27–21)

Statistics	OU	ISU
First downs	20	20
Total yards	392	435
Rushes/yards	31–120	31–113
Passing yards	272	322
Passing: Comp–Att–Int	22–34–0	27–40–3
Time of possession	27:48	32:12

Team	Category	Player	Statistics
Oklahoma	Passing	Spencer Rattler	22–27, 272 yards, 1 TD
Oklahoma	Rushing	Rhamondre Stevenson	18 carries, 97 yards
Oklahoma	Receiving	Marvin Mims	7 receptions, 101 yards, 1 TD
Iowa State	Passing	Brock Purdy	27–40, 322 yards, 1 TD, 3 INT
Iowa State	Rushing	Breece Hall	23 carries, 79 yards, 2 TD
Iowa State	Receiving	Xavier Hutchinson	10 receptions, 114 yards

=== vs No. 7 Florida (Cotton Bowl) ===
#7 Florida Gators (8–3) vs. #6 Oklahoma Sooners (8–2)

Quarter	1	2	3	4	Total
No. 7 Florida	3	10	0	7	20
No. 6 Oklahoma	17	14	10	14	55

at AT&T Stadium • Arlington, TX

- Date: Saturday, December 30, 2020
- Game time: 7:15 p.m. CST
- Game weather: Indoors
- Game attendance: 17,323
- Referee: Chris Coyte
- TV announcers (ESPN): Joe Tessitore (play-by-play), Dusty Dvoracek (analyst), and Holly Rowe (sideline)

Game information

First Quarter

- (12:59) OKLA – Marvin Mims 27 yard pass from Spencer Rattler, Gabe Brkic kick (Drive: 5 plays, 79 yards, 2:01; Oklahoma 7–0)
- (12:22) OKLA – Tre Norwood 45 yard interception return, Gabe Brkic kick (Oklahoma 14–0)
- (8:08) OKLA – Gabe Brkic 43 yard field goal (Drive: 5 plays, 30 yards, 1:03; Oklahoma 17–0)
- (0:31) FLA – Evan McPherson 21 yard field goal (Drive: 7 plays, 33 yards, 3:02; Oklahoma 17–3)

Second Quarter

- (8:08) FLA - Emory Jones 1 yard rush, Evan McPherson kick (Drive: 16 plays, 88 yards, 5:54; Oklahoma 17–10)
- (6:05) FLA – Evan McPherson 35 yard field goal (Drive: 5 plays, 12 yards, 1:33; Oklahoma 17–13)
- (4:08) OKLA – Theo Wease 36 yard pass from Spencer Rattler, Gabe Brkic kick (Drive: 4 plays, 60 yards, 1:49; Oklahoma 24–13)
- (0:16) OKLA – Spencer Rattler 1 yard rush, Gabe Brkic kick (Drive: 9 plays, 60 yards, 2:34; Oklahoma 31–13)

Third Quarter

- (7:51) OKLA – Gabe Brkic 20 yard field goal (Drive: 6 plays, 86 yards, 1:46; Oklahoma 34–13)
- (3:58) OKLA – Rhamondre Stevenson 15 yard rush, Gabe Brkic kick (Drive: 5 plays, 87 yard, 2:25; Oklahoma 41–13)

Fourth Quarter

- (10:30) OKLA – Charleston Rambo 20 yard pass from Spencer Rattler, Gabe Brkic kick (Drive: 8 plays, 97 yards, 3:42; Oklahoma 48–13)
- (6:11) OKLA - Marcus Major 46 yard rush, Gabe Brkic kick (Drive: 6 plays, 79 yards, 2:52; Oklahoma 55–13)
- (3:18) FLA - Jordan Pouncey 27 yard pass from Anthony Richardson, Chris Howard kick (Drive: 6 plays, 89 yards, 2:47; Oklahoma 55–20)

Statistics	FLA	OKLA
First downs	28	25
Total yards	521	684
Rushes/yards	39–250	40–435
Passing yards	271	249
Passing: Comp–Att–Int	25–45–1	15–25–0
Time of possession	33:20	26:40

Team	Category	Player	Statistics
Florida	Passing	Kyle Trask	16–28, 158 yards, 3 INT
Florida	Rushing	Emory Jones	10 carries, 60 yards, 1 TD
Florida	Receiving	Trent Whittemore	2 receptions, 47 yards
Oklahoma	Passing	Spencer Rattler	14–23, 247 yards, 3 TD
Oklahoma	Rushing	Rhamondre Stevenson	18 carries, 186 yards, 1 TD
Oklahoma	Receiving	Seth McGowan	3 receptions, 70 yards

== Statistics ==
=== Scoring ===
==== Scores by quarter (non-conference opponents) ====
	1	2	3	4	Total
All opponents	3	10	0	7	20
Oklahoma	48	24	10	21	103

==== Scores by quarter (Big 12 opponents) ====
	1	2	3	4	Total
Big 12 opponents	0	0	0	0	0
Oklahoma	0	0	0	0	0

==== Scores by quarter (All opponents) ====
	1	2	3	4	Total
All opponents	0	0	0	0	0
Oklahoma	31	10	0	7	48

== Rankings ==
Ranking movements Legend: ██ Increase in ranking ██ Decrease in ranking RV = Received votes т = Tied with team above or below
	Week																	
Poll	Pre	1	2	3	4	5	6	7	8	9	10	11	12	13	14	15	16	Final
AP	5	5*	3	3	18	RV	RV	RV	24	19	18	18	14	13	13	12	8	6
Coaches	6	6*	3	3 T	16	RV	RV	RV	24	19	18	17	14	13	12	10	7	6
CFP	Not released												11	11	11	10	6	Not released

== Players drafted into the NFL ==
Round	Pick	Player	Position	NFL team
2	63	Creed Humphrey	C	Kansas City Chiefs
3	96	Ronnie Perkins	DE	New England Patriots
4	120	Rhamondre Stevenson	RB	New England Patriots
4	137	Tre Brown	CB	Seattle Seahawks
7	245	Tre Norwood	CB	Pittsburgh Steelers
