= 2020 Baylor Bears football team =

American college football season

2020 Baylor Bears football
- Conference: Big 12 Conference
- Record: 2–7 (2–7 Big 12)
- Head coach: Dave Aranda (1st season)
- Offensive coordinator: Larry Fedora (1st season)
- Offensive scheme: Spread
- Defensive coordinator: Ron Roberts (1st season)
- Base defense: Multiple
- Home stadium: McLane Stadium

Uniform
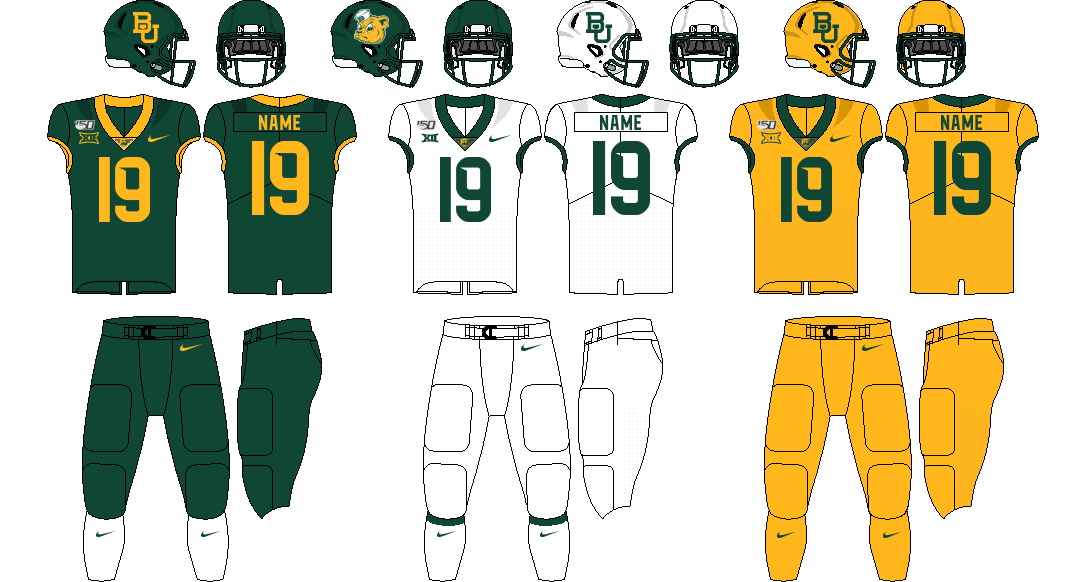

2020 Big 12 Conference football standings
	Conf.			Overall
Team	W		L	W		L
No. 9 Iowa State y	8	–	1	9	–	3
No. 6 Oklahoma y$	6	–	2	9	–	2
No. 20 Oklahoma State	6	–	3	8	–	3
No. 19 Texas	5	–	3	7	–	3
TCU	5	–	4	6	–	4
West Virginia	4	–	4	6	–	4
Kansas State	4	–	5	4	–	6
Texas Tech	3	–	6	4	–	6
Baylor	2	–	7	2	–	7
Kansas	0	–	8	0	–	9
Championship: Oklahoma 27, Iowa State 21
$ – Conference champion; y – Championship game participant; Rankings from AP Poll.

The 2020 Baylor Bears football team represented Baylor University in the 2020 NCAA Division I FBS football season. They played their home games at McLane Stadium in Waco, Texas, as a member of the Big 12 Conference and were led by first-year head coach Dave Aranda in the Bears' 122nd overall season.

== Offseason ==
=== Offseason departures ===
One Baylor player with remaining eligibility, James Lynch, declared early for the 2020 NFL draft. In addition, 18 seniors from the 2019 team graduated.

Baylor offseason departures
Name	Number	Pos.	Height	Weight	Year	Hometown	Notes
James Lynch	93	DT	6’4	295	Junior	Round Rock, TX	Declared for NFL Draft
Chris Platt	24	WR	5’11	172	Graduate	Willis, TX	Graduated
Blake Lynch	2	LB	6’3	224	Senior	Gilmer, TX	Graduated
Chris Miller	3	S	6’0	191	Senior	Frisco, TX	Graduated
Clay Johnston	4	LB	6’1	232	Senior	Abilene, TX	Graduated
Denzel Mims	5	WR	6’3	215	Senior	Daingerfield, TX	Graduated
JaMycal Hasty	6	RB	5’9	205	Senior	Longview, TX	Graduated
Henry Black	8	S	6’0	206	Senior	Shreveport, LA	Graduated
James Lockhart	9	DE	6’2	263	Senior	Ennis, TX	Graduated
Jameson Houston	11	CB	5’11	200	Senior	Dadeville, AL	Graduated
Owen Rogers	34	LB	6’2	211	Senior	Phoenix, AZ	Graduated
Cody George	37	TE	6’2	256	Senior	Lorena, TX	Graduated
Jordan Williams	38	LB	6’0	223	Senior	Paris, TX	Graduated
Ross Matiscik	46	LS	6’0	235	Senior	McKinney, TX	Graduated
Sam Tecklenburg	52	OL	6’4	310	Senior	Plano, TX	Graduated
Johncarlo Valentin	57	OL	6’4	320	Senior	Philadelphia, PA	Graduated
Jake Fruhmorgen	63	OL	6’6	305	Senior	Tampa, FL	Graduated
Marques Jones	84	WR	6’2	211	Senior	McKinney, TX	Graduated
Bravvion Roy	99	DT	6’1	333	Senior	Spring, TX	Graduated

=== Recruiting ===
College recruiting (2020)
Name	Hometown	School	Height	Weight	Commit date
Anthony Anyanwu; DE	Sachse, Texas	Sachse High School	6 ft 3 in (1.91 m)	229 lb (104 kg)	Jun 19, 2019
Anthony Anyanwu; DE	Recruit ratings: Rivals: 247Sports: ESPN: (75)				
Jahdae Barron; CB	Pflugerville, Texas	Connally High School	5 ft 11 in (1.80 m)	175 lb (79 kg)	Jun 22, 2019
Jahdae Barron; CB	Recruit ratings: Rivals: 247Sports: ESPN: (78)				
Gavin Byers; OT	Colleyville, Texas	Colleyville Heritage High School	6 ft 5 in (1.96 m)	287 lb (130 kg)	Mar 26, 2019
Gavin Byers; OT	Recruit ratings: Rivals: 247Sports: ESPN: (78)				
Drake Dabney; TE	Cypress, Texas	Cypress Ranch High School	6 ft 5 in (1.96 m)	230 lb (100 kg)	Dec 17, 2019
Drake Dabney; TE	Recruit ratings: Rivals: 247Sports: ESPN: (77)				
Will Garner; OLB	Spring, Texas	Klein High School	6 ft 3 in (1.91 m)	187 lb (85 kg)	Mar 24, 2019
Will Garner; OLB	Recruit ratings: Rivals: 247Sports: ESPN: (77)				
Mike Harris; S	Phenix City, Alabama	Central High School	6 ft 0 in (1.83 m)	178 lb (81 kg)	Feb 5, 2020
Mike Harris; S	Recruit ratings: Rivals: 247Sports: ESPN: (75)				
Mose Jeffery; G	Longview, Texas	Kilgore College	6 ft 4 in (1.93 m)	330 lb (150 kg)	Aug 15, 2019
Mose Jeffery; G	Recruit ratings: Rivals: 247Sports: ESPN: (74)				
Seth Jones; WR	Pearland, Texas	Shadow Creek High School	5 ft 11 in (1.80 m)	180 lb (82 kg)	Aug 3, 2019
Seth Jones; WR	Recruit ratings: Rivals: 247Sports: ESPN: (73)				
Micah Mazzccua; OT	Baltimore, Maryland	St. Frances Academy	6 ft 5 in (1.96 m)	318 lb (144 kg)	Jan 19, 2020
Micah Mazzccua; OT	Recruit ratings: Rivals: 247Sports: ESPN: (78)				
AJ McCarthy; CB	Brownwood, Texas	Brownwood High School	5 ft 11 in (1.80 m)	180 lb (82 kg)	Jun 18, 2019
AJ McCarthy; CB	Recruit ratings: Rivals: 247Sports: ESPN: (76)				
Taye McWilliams; RB	Rosenberg, Texas	Lamar Consolidated High School	6 ft 1 in (1.85 m)	204 lb (93 kg)	Mar 28, 2019
Taye McWilliams; RB	Recruit ratings: Rivals: 247Sports: ESPN: (78)				
Brooks Miller; S	West Monroe, Louisiana	West Monroe High School	6 ft 1 in (1.85 m)	195 lb (88 kg)	Jun 24, 2019
Brooks Miller; S	Recruit ratings: Rivals: 247Sports: ESPN: (74)				
Devin Neal; CB	Lexington, Kentucky	Frederick Douglass High School	6 ft 0 in (1.83 m)	190 lb (86 kg)	Dec 15, 2019
Devin Neal; CB	Recruit ratings: Rivals: 247Sports: ESPN: (73)				
Chateau Reed; S	Lawton, Oklahoma	Lawton High School	6 ft 2 in (1.88 m)	180 lb (82 kg)	Jun 18, 2019
Chateau Reed; S	Recruit ratings: Rivals: 247Sports: ESPN: (75)				
Blake Shapen; QB	Shreveport, Louisiana	Evangel Christian Academy	6 ft 0 in (1.83 m)	185 lb (84 kg)	Feb 2, 2020
Blake Shapen; QB	Recruit ratings: Rivals: 247Sports: ESPN: (80)				
James Sylvester; DE	Newton, Texas	Newton High School	6 ft 4 in (1.93 m)	230 lb (100 kg)	Nov 25, 2019
James Sylvester; DE	Recruit ratings: Rivals: 247Sports: ESPN: (81)				
Alfahiym Walcott; CB	El Dorado, Kansas	Butler County Community College	6 ft 1 in (1.85 m)	190 lb (86 kg)	Feb 5, 2020
Alfahiym Walcott; CB	Recruit ratings: Rivals: 247Sports: ESPN: (75)				
Overall recruit ranking: Rivals: 60 247Sports: 54 ESPN: 57
Note: In many cases, Scout, Rivals, 247Sports, On3, and ESPN may conflict in their listings of height and weight.; In these cases, the average was taken. ESPN grades are on a 100-point scale.; Sources: "Rivals commits". Rivals.; "ESPN commits". ESPN.; "2020 Team Ranking". Rivals.com.; "247Sports commits". 247Sports.

=== 2020 NFL draft ===
==== Team players drafted into the NFL ====
Round	Pick	Player	Position	NFL team
2	59	Denzel Mims	WR	New York Jets
4	130	James Lynch	DT	Minnesota Vikings
6	184	Bravvion Roy	DT	Carolina Panthers
7	234	Clay Johnston	LB	Los Angeles Rams

== Preseason ==
=== Big 12 media poll ===
The Big 12 media days were held on July 21–22, 2020 in a virtual format due to the COVID-19 pandemic.

Big 12 media poll
Predicted finish	Team	Votes (1st place)
1	Oklahoma	80
2	Oklahoma State	6
3	Texas	4
4	Iowa State	
5	Baylor	
6	TCU	
7	Kansas State	
8	West Virginia	
9	Texas Tech	
10	Kansas	

== Schedule ==
=== Spring game ===
The Bears planned to hold spring practices in March and April 2020. The Baylor football spring "Green and Gold game" was to take place in Waco, TX on April 18, 2020. The team's spring practices as well as the spring game were canceled due to the COVID-19 pandemic.

=== Regular season ===
Baylor initially released its 2020 schedule on October 21, 2019. An updated Big 12 schedule was released on August 12, 2020 due to the COVID-19 pandemic. With the updated schedule, the Bears will host one non-conference games against Louisiana Tech. Baylor will host Kansas, Oklahoma State, TCU, and Kansas State and travel to West Virginia, Texas, Iowa State, Texas Tech, and Oklahoma in regular season conference play. On September 8, the Louisiana Tech game was postponed indefinitely. On September 12, a new game against Houston was announced in its place. On September 18, Baylor announced that the Houston versus Baylor game would be postponed due to Baylor not meeting the Big 12 Conference COVID-19 game cancellation thresholds.

The Bears had games against Ole Miss and Incarnate Word, which were canceled due to the COVID-19 pandemic.

Date	Time	Opponent	Site	TV	Result	Attendance
September 26	6:30 p.m.	Kansas	McLane Stadium; Waco, TX	ESPNU	W 47–14	11,667
October 3	11:00 a.m.	at West Virginia	Milan Puskar Stadium; Morgantown, WV	ABC	L 21–27 ^{2OT}	978
October 24	2:30 p.m.	at Texas	Darrell K Royal–Texas Memorial Stadium; Austin, TX (rivalry)	ESPN	L 16–27	18,202
October 31	2:30 p.m.	TCU	McLane Stadium; Waco, TX (rivalry)	ESPN2	L 23–33	11,667
November 7	6:00 p.m.	at No. 17 Iowa State	Jack Trice Stadium; Ames, IA	FS1	L 31–38	13,535
November 14	3:00 p.m.	at Texas Tech	Jones AT&T Stadium; Lubbock, TX (rivalry)	FS1	L 23–24	12,914
November 28	6:00 p.m.	Kansas State	McLane Stadium; Waco, TX	ESPN2	W 32–31	11,667
December 5	7:00 p.m.	at No. 11 Oklahoma	Gaylord Family Oklahoma Memorial Stadium; Norman, OK	FOX	L 14–27	22,700
December 12	2:30 p.m.	No. 22 Oklahoma State	McLane Stadium; Waco, TX	ESPN	L 3–42	11,667
Rankings from AP Poll and CFP Rankings (after November 24) released prior to game; All times are in Central time

Schedule source:

== Coaching staff ==
Coach	Title	Year at Baylor	Previous job
Dave Aranda	Head Coach	1st	LSU (DC)
Joey McGuire	Assoc. HC/OLB	4th	Cedar Hill High School (HC)
Larry Fedora	OC/QB	1st	North Carolina (HC)
Ron Roberts	DC/ILB	1st	Louisiana (DC)
Jorge Munoz	PGC/WR	1st	LSU (offensive analyst)
Shawn Bell	TE	4th	Cedar Ridge High School (HC)
Dennis Johnson	DL	1st	LSU (DL)
Justin Johnson	RB	1st	Houston (RB)
Matt Powledge	S/ST	1st	Louisiana (OLB/ST)
Brian Stewart	CB	1st	Detroit Lions (DB)
Joe Wickline	OL	1st	West Virginia (OL)

== Game summaries ==
=== Vs. Kansas ===
Kansas Jayhawks (0–1) vs. Baylor Bears (0–0)

Quarter	1	2	3	4	Total
Kansas	7	0	0	7	14
Baylor	7	10	14	16	47

at McLane Stadium • Waco, TX

- Date: Saturday, September 26, 2020
- Game time: 6:30 p.m. CDT
- Game weather: Fair • Temperature: 85°F
- Game attendance: 11,667
- Referee: Kevin Mar
- TV announcers (ESPNU): Roy Philpott, Kelly Stouffer

Game information

First Quarter

- (11:29) KAN – Pooka Williams Jr. 21 yard rush, Jacob Borcila kick (Drive: 8 plays, 79 yards, 3:31; KAN 7–0)
- (5:24) BAY – Trestan Ebner 1 yard rush, John Mayers kick (Drive: 7 plays, 55 yards, 2:38; 7–7)

Second Quarter

- (8:07) BAY – John Mayers 47 yard field goal (Drive: 20 plays, 60 yards, 7:54; BAY 10–7)
- (4:13) BAY – Charlie Brewer 18 yard pass to Trestan Ebner, John Mayers kick (Drive: 7 plays, 67 yards, 2:25; BAY 17–7)

Third Quarter

- (14:44) BAY – Trestan Ebner 100 yard kickoff return, John Mayers Kick (BAY 24–7)
- (9:07) BAY – John Lovett 7 yard rush, John Mayers kick (Drive: 9 plays, 61 yards, 3:31; BAY 31–7)

Fourth Quarter

- (12:50) BAY – Terrel Bernard 2 yard safety (BAY 33–7)
- (12:35) BAY – Trestan Ebner 83 yard kickoff return, John Mayers kick (BAY 40–7)
- (7:03) KAN – Pooka Williams 16 yard rush, Jacob Borcila kick (Drive: 12 plays, 66 yards, 5:47; BAY 40–14)
- (4:00) BAY – Craig Williams 26 yard rush, John Mayers kick (Drive: 7 plays, 62 yards, 3:03; BAY 47–14)

Statistics	KAN	BAY
First downs	20	24
Total yards	328	352
Rushes/yards	43/169	43/203
Passing yards	159	149
Passing: Comp–Att–Int	19–33–0	16–24–0
Time of possession	31:30	28:30

Team	Category	Player	Statistics
Kansas	Passing	Jalon Daniels	19–33, 159 yards
Kansas	Rushing	Pooka Williams Jr.	14 carries, 76 yards, 2 TD
Kansas	Receiving	Kwamie Lassiter II	6 receptions, 65 yards
Baylor	Passing	Charlie Brewer	15–23, 142 yards, 1 TD
Baylor	Rushing	John Lovett	17 carries, 78 yards, 1 TD
Baylor	Receiving	Trestan Ebner	2 receptions, 53 yards, 1 TD

=== At West Virginia ===
Baylor Bears (1–0) vs. West Virginia Mountaineers (1–1)

Quarter	1	2	3	4	OT	2OT	Total
Baylor	0	7	0	7	7	0	21
West Virginia	7	0	7	0	7	6	27

at Milan Puskar Stadium • Morgantown, WV

- Date: Saturday, October 3, 2020
- Game time: 11:00 a.m. CDT
- Game weather: partly cloudy • Temperature: 57°F
- Game attendance: 978
- Referee: Scott Campbell
- TV announcers (ABC): Bob Wischusen, Dan Orlovsky and Rocky Boiman

Game information

First Quarter

- (8:51) WVU – Jarret Doege 1 yard rush, Evan Stanley kick (Drive: 15 plays, 70 yards, 6:09; WVU 7–0)

Second Quarter

- (6:44) BAY – Charlie Brewer 7 yard pass to R.J. Sneed, John Mayers kick (Drive: 5 plays, 30 yards, 2:43 7–7)

Third Quarter

- (1:38) WVU – Leddie Brown 1 yard rush, Evan Stanley kick (Drive: 11 plays, 72 yards, 5:05, WVU 14–7)

Fourth Quarter

- (1:19) BAY – Charlie Brewer 34 yard pass to Josh Fleeks, John Mayers kick (Drive: 4 plays, 59 yards, 0:36, 14–14)

Overtime

- (OT) WVU – Jarret Doege 6 yard pass to Bryce Ford-Wheaton, Evan Stanley kick (Drive: 5 plays, 25 yards, WVU 21–14)
- (OT) BAY – Charlie Brewer 25 yard pass to Ben Sims, John Mayers kick (Drive: 1 play, 25 yards, 21–21)
- (2OT) WVU – Leddie Brown 3 yard rush (Drive: 4 plays, 25 yards, WVU 27–21)

Statistics	BAY	WVU
First downs	15	18
Total yards	256	345
Rushes/yards	33/27	39/134
Passing yards	229	211
Passing: Comp–Att–Int	23–38–2	30–42–2
Time of possession	28:07	31:53

Team	Category	Player	Statistics
Baylor	Passing	Charlie Brewer	23–38, 229 yards, 3 TD, 2 INT
Baylor	Rushing	John Lovett	14 carries, 23 yards
Baylor	Receiving	R.J. Sneed	6 receptions, 48 yards, 1 TD
West Virginia	Passing	Jarret Doege	30–42, 211 yards, 1 TD, 2 INT
West Virginia	Rushing	Leddie Brown	27 carries, 93 yards, 2 TD
West Virginia	Receiving	Sam James	8 reception, 66 yards

=== At Texas ===
Baylor Bears (1–1) vs. Texas Longhorns (2–2)

Quarter	1	2	3	4	Total
Baylor	3	0	0	13	16
Texas	0	13	14	0	27

at Darrell K Royal–Texas Memorial Stadium • Austin, TX

- Date: Saturday, October 24, 2020
- Game time: 2:30 p.m. CDT
- Game weather: Cloudy • Temperature: 62 °F (17 °C), Wind: 4 mph (6.4 km/h)
- Game attendance: 18,202
- Referee: Kevin Mar
- TV announcers (ESPN): Mark Jones, Dusty Dvoracek

Game information

First Quarter

- (0:49) BAY – John Mayers 22 yard field goal (Drive: 12 plays, 67 yards, 5:35; BAY 3–0)

Second Quarter

- (12:10) TEX – Cameron Dicker 42 yard field goal (Drive: 11 plays, 52 yards, 3:39; 3–3)
- (6:15) TEX – Cameron Dicker 23 yard field goal (Drive: 9 plays, 75 yards, 3:54; TEX 6–3)
- (1:53) TEX – Sam Ehlinger 3 yard pass to Joshua Moore, Cameron Dicker kick (Drive: 7 plays, 80 yards, 2:32; TEX 13–3)

Third Quarter

- (10:25) TEX – Sam Ehlinger 1 yard rush, Cameron Dicker kick (Drive: 12 plays, 75 yards, 4:35; TEX 20–3)
- (0:20) TEX – Sam Ehlinger 9 yard rush, Cameron Dicker kick (Drive: 6 plays, 75 yards, 3:21; TEX 27–3)

Fourth Quarter

- (11:24) BAY – Charlie Brewer 3 yard pass to John Lovett, Charlie Brewer pass failed (Drive: 9 plays, 75 yards, 3:56; TEX 27–9)
- (7:37) BAY – Charlie Brewer 7 yard pass to Gavin Holmes, John Mayers kick (Drive: 5 plays, 25 yards, 3:56; TEX 27–16)

Statistics	BAY	TEX
First downs	22	19
Total yards	316	429
Rushes/yards	21/64	47/159
Passing yards	252	270
Passing: Comp–Att–Int	31–44–0	15–23–1
Time of possession	27:53	32:07

Team	Category	Player	Statistics
Baylor	Passing	Charlie Brewer	30–43, 256 yards, 2 TD
Baylor	Rushing	John Lovett	4 carries, 21 yards
Baylor	Receiving	R.J. Sneed	4 receptions, 62 yards
Texas	Passing	Sam Ehlinger	15–23, 270 yards, 1 TD, 1 INT
Texas	Rushing	Keaontay Ingram	16 carries, 57 yards
Texas	Receiving	Tarik Black	1 reception, 72 yards

=== Vs. TCU ===
TCU Horned Frogs (1–3) vs. Baylor Bears (1–2)

Quarter	1	2	3	4	Total
TCU	20	10	3	0	33
Baylor	0	7	7	9	23

at McLane Stadium • Waco, TX

- Date: Saturday, October 31, 2020
- Game time: 2:30 p.m. CDT
- Game weather: clear • Temperature: 70°F
- Game attendance: 11,667
- Referee: Michael Vandervelde
- TV: ESPN2

Game information

First Quarter

- (9:06) TCU – Darwin Barlow 3 yard rush, Griffin Kell kick (Drive: 5 plays, 73 yards, 1:33; TCU 7–0)
- (7:54) TCU – Derius Davis 67 yard punt return, Griffin Kell kick (TCU 14–0)
- (4:36) TCU – Max Duggan 13 yard pass to Taye Barber, Griffin Kell kick missed (Drive: 4 plays, 60 yards, 0:58; TCU 20–0)

Second Quarter

- (13:30) TCU – Zach Evans 30 yard rush, Griffin Kell kick (Drive: 2 plays, 48 yards, 0:50; TCU 27–0)
- (9:07) TCU – Griffin Kell 33 yard field goal (Drive: 8 plays, 25 yards, 3:05; TCU 30–0)
- (00:14) BAY – Charlie Brewer 1 yard pass to Ben Sims, John Mayers kick (Drive: 5 plays, 35 yards, 1:09; TCU 30–7)

Third Quarter

- (10:24) TCU – Griffin Kell 34 yard field goal (Drive: 6 plays, 80 yards, 2:19; TCU 33–7)
- (2:59) BAY – Charlie Brewer 3 yard pass to Ben Sims, John Mayers kick (Drive: 11 plays, 69 yards, 3:36, TCU 33–14)

Fourth Quarter

- (12:58) BAY – John Mayers 27 yard field goal (Drive: 9 plays, 61 yards, 3:11; TCU 33–17)
- (10:25) BAY – Craig Williams 32 yard run, 2-pt conversion failed (Drive: 5 plays, 71 yards, 1:32, TCU 33–23)

Statistics	TCU	BAY
First downs	20	15
Total yards	385	278
Rushes/yards	44/247	33/75
Passing yards	138	203
Passing: Comp–Att–Int	14–23–0	17–37–1
Time of possession	31:23	28:37

Team	Category	Player	Statistics
TCU	Passing	Max Duggan	14–23, 138 yards, 1 TD
TCU	Rushing	Darwin Barlow	16 carries, 117 yards, 1 TD
TCU	Receiving	Quentin Johnston	3 receptions, 64 yards
Baylor	Passing	Charlie Brewer	17–37, 203 yards, 2 TD, 1 INT
Baylor	Rushing	Craig Williams	10 carries, 91 yards, 1 TD
Baylor	Receiving	Yusuf Terry	2 receptions, 43 yards

=== At Iowa State ===
Baylor Bears (1–3) vs. No. 17 Iowa State Cyclones (4–2)

Quarter	1	2	3	4	Total
Baylor	14	7	3	7	31
Iowa State	0	10	21	7	38

at Jack Trice Stadium • Ames, IA

- Date: Saturday, November 7, 2020
- Game time: 6:00 p.m. CST
- Game weather: clear • Temperature: 66°F
- Game attendance: 13,535
- Referee: Scott Campbell
- TV: FS1

Game information

First Quarter

- (11:07) BAY – Charlie Brewer 9 yard pass to R.J. Sneed, John Mayers kick (Drive: 6 plays, 89 yards, 2:45, BAY 7–0)
- (2:31) BAY – Charlie Brewer 9 yard pass to Drake Dabney, John Mayers kick (Drive: 6 plays, 36 yards, 2:46, BAY 14–0)

Second Quarter

- (12:52) ISU – Breece Hall 14 yard run, Connor Assalley kick (Drive: 5 plays, 35 yards, 2:37, BAY 14–7)
- (7:21) BAY – Jalen Pitre 30 yd interception, John Mayers kick (BAY 21–7)
- (2:04) ISU – Connor Assalley 42 yard field goal (Drive: 9 plays, 40 yards, 5:17, BAY 21–10)

Third Quarter

- (12:06) BAY – John Mayers 36 yard field goal (Drive: 4 plays, 2 yards, 1:18, BAY 24–10)
- (11:11) ISU – Brock Purdy 22 yard pass to Charlie Kolar, Connor Assalley kick (Drive: 2 plays, 33 yards, 0:44, BAY 24–17)
- (7:37) ISU – Breece Hall 17 yard run, Connor Assalley kick (Drive: 50 plays, 80 yards, 2:31, 24–24)
- (0:23) ISU – Brock Purdy 10 yard pass to Chase Allen, Connor Assalley kick (Drive: 11 plays, 71 yards, 5:17, ISU 31–24)

Fourth Quarter

- (10:46) ISU – Brock Purdy 6 yard pass to Breece Hall, Connor Assalley kick (Drive: 3 plays, 17 yards, 1:26, ISU 38–24)
- (8:43) BAY – Charlie Brewer 58 yard pass to Trestan Ebner, John Mayers kick (Drive: 6 plays, 80 yards, 1:56, ISU 38–31)

Statistics	BAY	ISU
First downs	17	23
Total yards	366	362
Rushes/yards	27/71	41/198
Passing yards	295	164
Passing: Comp–Att–Int	22–33–2	15–24–3
Time of possession	26:55	33:05

Team	Category	Player	Statistics
Baylor	Passing	Charlie Brewer	22–33, 295 yards, 3 TD, 2 INT
Baylor	Rushing	Charlie Brewer	10 carries, 29 yards
Baylor	Receiving	R.J. Sneed	6 receptions, 93 yards, 1 TD
Iowa State	Passing	Brock Purdy	15–24, 164 yards, 3 TD, 3 INT
Iowa State	Rushing	Breece Hall	31 carries, 133 yards, 2 TD
Iowa State	Receiving	Charlie Kolar	3 receptions, 45 yards, 1 TD

=== At Texas Tech ===
Baylor Bears (1–4) vs. Texas Tech Red Raiders (2–5)

Quarter	1	2	3	4	Total
Baylor	7	6	10	0	23
Texas Tech	3	3	6	12	24

at Jones AT&T Stadium • Lubbock, TX

- Date: Thursday, November 14, 2020
- Game time: 3:00 p.m. CST
- Game weather: windy• Temperature: 78°F
- Game attendance: 12,914
- Referee: David Alvarez
- TV announcers (FS1): Eric Collins (play-by-play) and Ben Leber (analyst)

Game information

First Quarter

- (9:15) TTU – Jonathan Garibay 48 yard field goal (Drive: 9 plays, 29 yards, 3:17, TTU 3–0)
- (0:55) BAY – Jalen Pitre 26 yard interception, John Mayers kick (BAY 7–3)

Second Quarter

- (7:12) BAY – John Mayers 22 yard field goal (Drive: 14 plays, 61 yards, 6:45, BAY 10–3)
- (1:12) TTU – Jonathan Garibay 28 yard field goal (Drive: 15 plays, 65 yards, 6:00, BAY 10–6)
- (0:00) BAY – John Mayers 48 yard field goal (Drive: 6 plays 32 yards, 1:12, BAY 13–6)

Third Quarter

- (11:04) BAY – Charlie Brewer 8 yard run, John Mayers kick (Drive: 6 plays, 34 yards, 2:58, BAY 20–6)
- (8:42) TTU – Tahj Brooks 1 yard run, Jonathan Garibay kick blocked (Drive: 5 plays, 36 yards, 1:07, BAY 20–12)
- (1:11) BAY – John Mayers 23 yard field goal (Drive: 12 plays, 62 yards, 3:59, BAY 23–12)

Fourth Quarter

- (11:48) TTU – Tahj Brooks 2 yard run, Alan Bowman pass failed (Drive: 5 plays, 41 yards, 1:27, BAY 23–18)
- (4:41) TTU – Jonathan Garibay 46 yard field goal (Drive: 9 plays, 56 yards, 3:40, BAY 23–21)
- (0:00) TTU – Jonathan Garibay 25 yard field goal (Drive 12 plays, 79 yards, 2:14, TTU 24–23)

Statistics	BAY	TTU
First downs	20	19
Total yards	360	381
Rushes/yards	48/207	39/124
Passing yards	153	257
Passing: Comp–Att–Int	17–26–1	23–38–1
Time of possession	33:27	26:33

Team	Category	Player	Statistics
Baylor	Passing	Charlie Brewer	17–26, 153 yards, 1 INT
Baylor	Rushing	Qualan Jones	21 carries, 86 yards
Baylor	Receiving	R.J. Sneed	4 receptions, 58 yards
Texas Tech	Passing	Alan Bowman	14–23, 181 yards, 1 INT
Texas Tech	Rushing	SaRodorick Thompson	13 carries, 69 yards
Texas Tech	Receiving	KeSean Carter	7 receptions, 64 yards

=== Vs. Kansas State ===
Kansas State Wildcats (4–4) vs. Baylor Bears (1–5)

Quarter	1	2	3	4	Total
Kansas State	14	3	0	14	31
Baylor	6	0	9	17	32

at McLane Stadium • Waco, TX

- Date: Saturday, November 28, 2020
- Game time: 6:00 p.m. CST
- Game weather: rain • Temperature: 55°F
- Game attendance: 11,667
- Referee: Kevin Mar
- TV: ESPN2

Game information

First Quarter

- (13:04) BAY – Charlie Brewer 7 yard run, rush failed (Drive: 3 plays, 9 yards, 1:07, BAY 6–0)
- (12:51) KSU – Malik Knowles 75 yard run, Blake Lynch kick (Drive: 1 play, 75 yards, 0:13, KSU 7–6)
- (4:07) KSU – Will Howard 8 yard pass to Deuce Vaughn, Blake Lynch kick (Drive: 7 plays, 35 yards, 3:28, KSU 14–6)

Second Quarter

- (13:02) KSU – Blake Lynch 20 yard field goal (Drive: 10 plays, 44 ayrds, 4:33, KSU 17–6)

Third Quarter

- (11:59) BAY – John Mayers 28 yard field goal (Drive: 8 plays, 64 yards, 3:01, KSU 17–9)
- (7:16) BAY – Charlie Brewer 23 yard pass to R.J. Sneed, Charlie Brewer drop-kick failed (Drive: 7 plays, 63 yards, 2:48, KSU 17–15)

Fourth Quarter

- (13:57) KSU – Will Howard 24 yard run, Blake Lynch kick (Drive: 2 plays, 73 yards, 0:51, KSU 24–15)
- (10:51) BAY – Charlie Brewer 8 yard pass to Trestan Ebner, John Mayers kick (Drive: 8 plays, 75 yards, 3:06, KSU 24–22)
- (8:59) KSU – Deuce Vaughn 38 yard run, Blake Lynch kick (Drive: 4 plays, 60 yards, 1:52, KSU 31–22)
- (4:16) BAY – Charlie Brewer 1 yard run, John Mayers kick (Drive: 9 plays, 54 yards, 4:43, KSU 31–29)
- (0:00) BAY – John Mayers 30 yard field goal (Drive: 10 plays, 57 yards, 2:32, BAY 32–31)

Statistics	KSU	BAY
First downs	14	21
Total yards	344	420
Rushes/yards	35/256	36/71
Passing yards	88	349
Passing: Comp–Att–Int	9–18–2	31–39–0
Time of possession	25:42	34:18

Team	Category	Player	Statistics
Kansas State	Passing	Will Howard	9–18, 88 yards, 1 TD, 2 INT
Kansas State	Rushing	Deuce Vaughn	19 carries, 102 yards, 1 TD
Kansas State	Receiving	Briley Moore	2 receptions, 55 yards
Baylor	Passing	Charlie Brewer	31–39, 349 yards, 2 TD
Baylor	Rushing	Charlie Brewer	23 carries, 56 yards, 2 TD
Baylor	Receiving	R.J. Sneed	6 receptions, 86 yards, 1 TD

=== At Oklahoma ===
Baylor Bears (2–5) vs. Oklahoma Sooners (6–2)

Quarter	1	2	3	4	Total
Baylor	0	0	7	7	14
Oklahoma	3	7	7	10	27

at Gaylord Family Oklahoma Memorial Stadium • Norman, OK

- Date: Saturday, December 5, 2020
- Game time: 7:00 p.m. CST
- Game weather: clear • Temperature: 46°F
- Game attendance: 22,700
- Referee: Brandon Cruse
- TV: FOX

Game information

First Quarter

- (10:11) OKLA – Gabe Brkic 20 yard field goal (Drive: 10 plays, 72 yards, 4:49, OKLA 3–0)

Second Quarter

- (1:04) OKLA – Rhamondre Stevenson 3 yard run, Gabe Birkic kick (Drive: 4 plays, 31 yards, 1:42, OKLA 10–0)

Third Quarter

- (10:08) OKLA – Spencer Rattler 9 yard pass to Theo Wease, Gabe Birkic kick (Drive: 5 plays, 52 yards, 2:50, OKLA 17–0)
- (4:50) BAY – Charlie Brewer 25 yard pass to Tyquan Thornton, John Mayers kick (Drive 12 plays, 71 yards, 5:18, OKLA 17–7)

Fourth Quarter

- (13:30) OKLA – Gabe Brkic 50 yard field goal (Drive: 5 plays, 24 yards, 2:53, OKLA 20–7)
- (5:17) OKLA – Spencer Rattler 8 yard pass to Brayden Willis, Gabe Brkic kick (Drive: 13 plays, 80 yards, 6:23, OKLA 27–7)
- (0:59) BAY – Charlie Brewer 2 yard run, John Mayers kick (Drive: 17 plays, 96 yards, 4:18, OKLA 27–14)

Statistics	BAY	OKLA
First downs	19	16
Total yards	288	269
Rushes/yards	26/25	31/76
Passing yards	263	193
Passing: Comp–Att–Int	30–56–2	20–28–1
Time of possession	29:50	30:10

Team	Category	Player	Statistics
Baylor	Passing	Charlie Brewer	30–56, 263 yards, 1 TD, 2 INT
Baylor	Rushing	Jonah White	3 carries, 18 yards
Baylor	Receiving	Jonah White	9 receptions, 63 yards
Oklahoma	Passing	Spencer Rattler	20–28, 193 yards, 2 TD, 1 INT
Oklahoma	Rushing	Rhamondre Stevenson	15 carries, 50 yards, 1 TD
Oklahoma	Receiving	Theo Wease	5 receptions, 66 yards, 1 TD

=== Vs. Oklahoma State ===
Oklahoma State Cowboys (6–3) vs. Baylor Bears (2–6)

Quarter	1	2	3	4	Total
Oklahoma State	14	14	7	7	42
Baylor	0	0	0	3	3

at McLane Stadium • Waco, TX

- Date: Saturday, December 12, 2020
- Game time: 6:00 p.m. CST
- Game weather: fair • Temperature: 57°F
- Game attendance: 11,667
- Referee: Brad van Vark
- TV announcers (ESPNU): Jason Benetti (play-by-play) and Brock Huard (analyst)

Game information

First Quarter

- (14:42) OSU – Spencer Sanders 75 yard pass to Dillon Stoner, Brady Pohl kick (Drive: 2 plays, 75 yards, 0:18, OSU 7–0)
- (3:21) OSU – Spencer Sanders 15 yard pass to Dillon Stoner, Brady Pohl kick (Drive: 11 plays, 92 yards, 4:58, OSU 14–0)

Second Quarter

- (14:21) OSU – Spencer Sanders 40 yard pass to Dillon Stoner, Brady Pohl kick (Drive: 6 plays, 67 yards, 2:20, OSU 21–0)
- (11:30) OSU – Dominic Richardson 17 yard run, Brady Pohl kick (Drive: 4 plays, 50 yards, 1:21, OSU 28–0)

Third Quarter

- (2:38) OSU – Dominic Richardson 2 yard run, Brady Pohl kick (Drive: 8 plays, 75 yards, 3:13, OSU 35–0)

Fourth Quarter

- (7:55) BAY – John Mayers 40 yard field goal (Drive 14 plays, 57 yards, 4:25, OSU 35–3)
- (4:49) OSU – Dominic Richardson 1 yard run, Brady Pohl kick (Drive: 7 plays, 75 yards, 3:06, OSU 42–3)

Statistics	OKST	BAY
First downs	27	12
Total yards	608	156
Rushes/yards	47/261	31/70
Passing yards	347	86
Passing: Comp–Att–Int	20–30–2	18–34–0
Time of possession	33:45	26:15

Team	Category	Player	Statistics
Oklahoma State	Passing	Spencer Sanders	20–30, 347 yards, 3 TD, 2 INT
Oklahoma State	Rushing	Dominic Richardson	23 carries, 169 yards, 3 TD
Oklahoma State	Receiving	Dillon Stoner	8 receptions, 247 yards, 3 TD
Baylor	Passing	Charlie Brewer	13–26, 68 yards
Baylor	Rushing	Taye McWilliams	5 carries, 33 yards
Baylor	Receiving	Qualan Jones	8 receptions, 37 yards

== Rankings ==
Ranking movements Legend: ██ Increase in ranking ██ Decrease in ranking — = Not ranked RV = Received votes
	Week															
Poll	Pre	1	2	3	4	5	6	7	8	9	10	11	12	13	14	Final
AP	RV	RV*	RV	RV	RV	—	—	—	—	—	—	—	—	—	—	—
Coaches	RV	RV*	24	RV	RV	RV	—	—	—	—	—	—	—	—	—	—
CFP	Not released									—	—	—	—	—	—	Not released
