= 2020 Cotton Bowl Classic =

Postseason college football bowl game

2020 Goodyear Cotton Bowl Classic
- CFP New Year's Six; 85th Cotton Bowl Classic
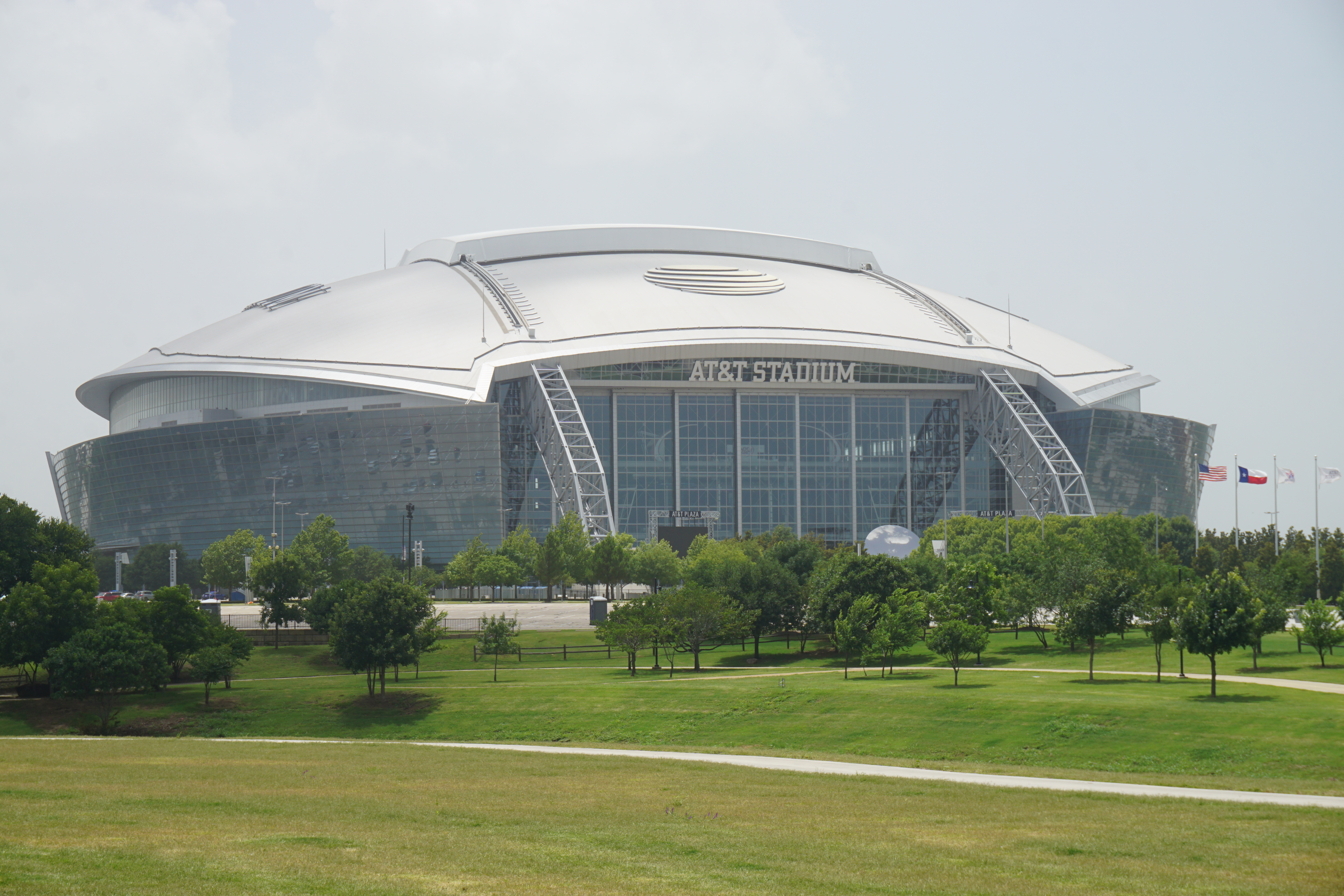
- AT&T Stadium in Arlington, Texas, hosted the Cotton Bowl Classic.
Florida Gators	Oklahoma Sooners
(8–3)	(8–2)
SEC	Big 12
20	55
Head coach: Dan Mullen	Head coach: Lincoln Riley
AP / Coaches / CFP; 10 / 10 / 7	AP / Coaches / CFP; 8 / 7 / 6
	1	2	3	4	Total
Florida	3	10	0	7	20
Oklahoma	17	14	10	14	55
- Date: December 30, 2020
- Season: 2020
- Stadium: AT&T Stadium
- Location: Arlington, Texas
- MVP: Offense: Rhamondre Stevenson (RB, Oklahoma); Defense: Tre Norwood (DB, Oklahoma)
- Favorite: Oklahoma by 8.5 (O/U: 65.5)
- Referee: Chris Coyte (Pac-12)
- Attendance: 17,323

United States TV coverage
- Network: ESPN and ESPN Radio
- Announcers: ESPN: Joe Tessitore (play-by-play); Dusty Dvoracek (analyst); Holly Rowe (sideline); ESPN Radio: Brad Sham, Jordan Rodgers, Ian Fitzsimmons

The 2020 Cotton Bowl Classic was a college football bowl game played on December 30, 2020, with kickoff at 8:00 p.m. EST (7:00 p.m. local CST) on ESPN. It was the 85th edition of the Cotton Bowl Classic, and was one of the 2020–21 bowl games concluding the 2020 FBS football season. Sponsored by the Goodyear Tire and Rubber Company, the game was officially known as the Goodyear Cotton Bowl Classic.

== Teams ==
As one of the New Year's Six bowl games, the participants of the game were determined by the College Football Playoff selection committee. The committee matched No. 7 (Note: Per final CFP Rankings released on December 20.) Florida of the Southeastern Conference (SEC) against No. 6 Oklahoma of the Big 12 Conference. The teams had only met once previously, a 24–14 Florida victory in the 2009 BCS National Championship Game. Several players from both teams opted not to participate in the game, choosing to prepare for the 2021 NFL draft. The opt-outs included three of Florida's receivers: Trevon Grimes, Kyle Pitts, and Kadarius Toney.

=== Florida Gators ===
Florida entered the bowl with an 8–3 record. The Gators were 8–2 in SEC play, then lost the SEC Championship Game to top-ranked Alabama. The Gators' other losses were to Texas A&M and LSU. Florida defeated one ranked team during the season, Georgia. This was the Gators' first appearance in a Cotton Bowl.

=== Oklahoma Sooners ===
Oklahoma entered the bowl with an 8–2 record. The Sooners were 6–2 in Big 12 play, then won the Big 12 Championship Game over Iowa State. The Sooners had lost earlier in the season to Iowa State; their only other loss was to Kansas State. Oklahoma defeated two ranked teams during conference play; Texas and Oklahoma State. The Sooners had played in two prior Cotton Bowls, winning in January 2002 and losing in January 2013.

== Game summary ==
2020 Goodyear Cotton Bowl Classic

Quarter	1	2	3	4	Total
No. 7 Florida	3	10	0	7	20
No. 6 Oklahoma	17	14	10	14	55

at AT&T Stadium • Arlington, Texas

- Date: Wednesday, December 30, 2020
- Game time: 8:00 p.m. EST (7:00 p.m. CST)
- Game weather: n/a (retractable roof closed)
- Referee: Chris Cotye (Pac-12)
- TV announcers (ESPN): Joe Tessitore (play-by-play), Dusty Dvoracek (analyst), and Holly Rowe (sideline)
- ESPN game summary

Game information

First quarter

- (12:59) OKLA – Marvin Mims 27 yard pass from Spencer Rattler, Gabe Brkic kick (Drive: 5 plays, 79 yards, 2:01; Oklahoma 7–0)
- (12:22) OKLA – Tre Norwood 45 yard interception return, Gabe Brkic kick (Oklahoma 14–0)
- (8:08) OKLA – Gabe Brkic 43 yard field goal (Drive: 5 plays, 30 yards, 1:03; Oklahoma 17–0)
- (0:31) FLA – Evan McPherson 21 yard field goal (Drive: 7 plays, 33 yards, 3:02; Oklahoma 17–3)

Second quarter

- (8:08) FLA – Emory Jones 1 yard rush, Evan McPherson kick (Drive: 16 plays, 88 yards, 5:54; Oklahoma 17–10)
- (5:57) FLA – Evan McPherson 35 yard field goal (Drive: 5 plays, 12 yards, 1:33; Oklahoma 17–13)
- (4:08) OKLA – Theo Wease 38 yard pass from Spencer Rattler, Gabe Brkic kick (Drive: 4 plays, 60 yards, 1:49; Oklahoma 24–13)
- (0:16) OKLA – Spencer Rattler 1 yard rush, Gabe Brkic kick (Drive: 9 plays, 60 yards, 2:34; Oklahoma 31–13)

Third quarter

- (7:51) OKLA – Gabe Brkic 20 yard field goal (Drive: 6 plays, 86 yards, 1:46; Oklahoma 34–13)
- (3:58) OKLA – Rhamondre Stevenson 15 yard rush, Gabe Brkic kick (Drive: 5 plays, 87 yards, 2:25; Oklahoma 41–13)

Fourth quarter

- (10:30) OKLA – Charleston Rambo 20 yard pass from Spencer Rattler, Gabe Brkic kick (Drive: 8 plays, 97 yards, 3:42; Oklahoma 48–13)
- (6:11) OKLA – Marcus Major 46 yard rush, Gabe Brkic kick (Drive: 6 plays, 79 yards, 2:52; Oklahoma 55–13)
- (3:18) FLA – Jordan Pouncey 27 yard pass from Anthony Richardson, Chris Howard kick (Drive: 6 plays, 89 yards, 2:47; Oklahoma 55–20)

=== Statistics ===
Statistics	FLA	OKLA
First downs	28	25
Plays–yards	84–521	65–684
Rushes–yards	39–250	40–435
Passing yards	271	249
Passing: comp–att–int	25–45–3	15–25–0
Turnovers		
Time of possession	33:20	26:40

Team	Category	Player	Statistics
Florida	Passing	Kyle Trask	16/28, 158 yards, 3 INT
Florida	Rushing	Emory Jones	10 carries, 60 yards, 1 TD
Florida	Receiving	Trent Whittemore	2 receptions, 47 yards
Oklahoma	Passing	Spencer Rattler	14/23, 247 yards, 3 TD
Oklahoma	Rushing	Rhamondre Stevenson	18 carries, 186 yards, 1 TD
Oklahoma	Receiving	Seth McGowan	3 receptions, 70 yards

The Sooners tied the Cotton Bowl record for most points scored, with 55, and set new Cotton Bowl records for rushing yards, with 435, and total yards, with 684.

== See also ==
- 2021 Rose Bowl, scheduled at the same venue two days later
