= Woodi Washington =

American football player (born 2000)

No. 5
- Position: Cornerback
- Class: Redshirt Fifth Year

Personal information
- Born: November 2, 2000 (age 26)
- Listed height: 5 ft 11 in (1.80 m)
- Listed weight: 191 lb (87 kg)

Career information
- High school: Oakland (Murfreesboro, Tennessee)
- College: Oklahoma (2019–2024)
- Stats at ESPN

Woodi Washington (born November 2, 2000) is an American former college football cornerback. He played for the Oklahoma Sooners.

== Early life ==
Washington attended and played high school football at Oakland High School in Murfreesboro, Tennessee. He played wide receiver and defensive back. He was rated as a four-star recruit and committed to play college football for the Oklahoma Sooners over Ohio State, Florida State and Alabama.

== College career ==
During the 2019 season, Washington notched 16 tackles in five games. In week 3 of the 2020 season, he notched five tackles, a pass deflection, and an interception versus rival Texas. In the 2020 Cotton Bowl Classic, Washington notched an interception as he helped the Sooners to a win over Florida. In the 2020 season, he recorded 45 tackles, four pass deflections, and two interceptions. During the 2021 season, Washington totaled 27 tackles, two pass deflections, and two interceptions. In the 2022 season, he notched 67 tackles, six pass deflections, an interception, and a forced fumble. During the 2023 season, Washington recorded 48 tackles with two and a half being for a loss, and seven pass deflections.

== Professional career ==
Pre-draft measurables
| Height | Weight | Arm length | Hand span | 40-yard dash | 10-yard split | 20-yard split | 20-yard shuttle | Three-cone drill | Vertical jump | Broad jump | Bench press |
|---|---|---|---|---|---|---|---|---|---|---|---|
| 5 ft 11 1/4 in (1.81 m) | 191 lb (87 kg) | 31 5/8 in (0.80 m) | 9 1/8 in (0.23 m) | 4.57 s | 1.67 s | 2.74 s | 4.32 s | 7.08 s | 33.5 in (0.85 m) | 10 ft 1 in (3.07 m) | 11 reps |
All values from Pro Day
