= 2021 Rose Bowl =

College Football Playoff Semifinal bowl game

2021 Rose Bowl presented by Capital One
- College Football Playoff Semifinal; 107th Rose Bowl Game
| Notre Dame Fighting Irish | Alabama Crimson Tide |
| (10–1) | (11–0) |
| ACC | SEC |
| 14 | 31 |
| Head coach: Brian Kelly | Head coach: Nick Saban |
| AP / Coaches / CFP; 4 / 4 / 4 | AP / Coaches / CFP; 1 / 1 / 1 |
| | 1 | 2 | 3 | 4 | Total |
|---|---|---|---|---|---|
| Notre Dame | 0 | 7 | 0 | 7 | 14 |
| Alabama | 14 | 7 | 7 | 3 | 31 |
- Date: January 1, 2021
- Season: 2020
- Stadium: AT&T Stadium
- Location: Arlington, Texas
- MVP: Offense: DeVonta Smith (WR, Alabama); Defense: Patrick Surtain II (CB, Alabama)
- Favorite: Alabama by 19
- Referee: John O'Neill (Big Ten)
- Attendance: 18,373

United States TV coverage
- Network: ESPN and ESPN Radio
- Announcers: ESPN: Sean McDonough (play-by-play); Todd Blackledge (analyst); Todd McShay and Allison Williams (sidelines); ESPN Radio: Joe Tessitore, Andre Ware, Holly Rowe
- Nielsen ratings: (18.89 million viewers)

International TV coverage
- Network: ESPN Deportes; ESPN Brasil

The 2021 Rose Bowl (branded as the College Football Playoff Semifinal at the Rose Bowl Game presented by Capital One for sponsorship reasons) was a college football bowl game played on January 1, 2021, with kickoff at 3:00 p.m. CST at AT&T Stadium in Arlington, Texas. The 107th playing of the Rose Bowl Game, it was one of two College Football Playoff (CFP) semifinal games; it pitted two of the four teams selected by the College Football Playoff Selection Committee—Notre Dame from the Atlantic Coast Conference (ACC), and Alabama from the Southeastern Conference (SEC), with its winner facing the winner of the Sugar Bowl, Ohio State, at the 2021 College Football Playoff National Championship. It was also one of the 2020–21 bowl games concluding the 2020 FBS football season.

In a move prompted by the COVID-19 pandemic in California, this was the first playing of the Rose Bowl outside of Pasadena, California, since the 1942 game played at Duke University due to fears of an attack on the west coast following the attack on Pearl Harbor.

== Impact of the COVID-19 pandemic ==
The game was originally scheduled to be played at the Rose Bowl stadium in Pasadena, California. In early December 2020, it was announced that the bowl would be contested behind closed doors without fans, due to California Governor Gavin Newsom's orders in response to the COVID-19 pandemic in California. Organizers attempted to negotiate an exemption to the health orders—which prohibit any spectators at a sporting event—in order to allow the family members of participating players to attend. However, they were denied.

On December 15, the Los Angeles Times reported that "serious considerations" were being made to re-locate the game due to the state of the pandemic in California, with major surges in new cases, and ICU capacity in Southern California declared to be 0% as of December 17. On December 19, 2020, the Pasadena Tournament of Roses Association announced that the game would be relocated to AT&T Stadium in Arlington, Texas. The only prior time the Rose Bowl was played outside of Pasadena was in 1942 during World War II; after large gatherings were prohibited on the west coast due to fears of a Japanese attack following the attack on Pearl Harbor in December 1941, the game was re-located to Duke Stadium in Durham, North Carolina.

The Association stated that it was not immediately clear if the game would still be called the "Rose Bowl", as consent would also have to be obtained from the city of Pasadena, due to a master license agreement covering use of the name (which is co-owned by the Tournament of Roses Association and Pasadena's municipal government). A later press release from the Association referred to the game as the College Football Playoff Semifinal presented by Capital One, pending a decision on usage of the Rose Bowl name.

A formal decision was scheduled to be discussed by city officials in Pasadena on December 22. On December 30, the City of Pasadena approved use of the Rose Bowl name for the game in Arlington, reportedly after receiving $2 million from the Tournament of Roses “to assist the city with its expenses and lost revenue”.

The game was allowed to have 16,000 fans in attendance. The University of Alabama fan ticket allotment was 3,380. In comparison, the 2021 Sugar Bowl in New Orleans only would be allowed 3,000 fans in the Superdome in total.

== Background ==
=== College Football Playoff ===
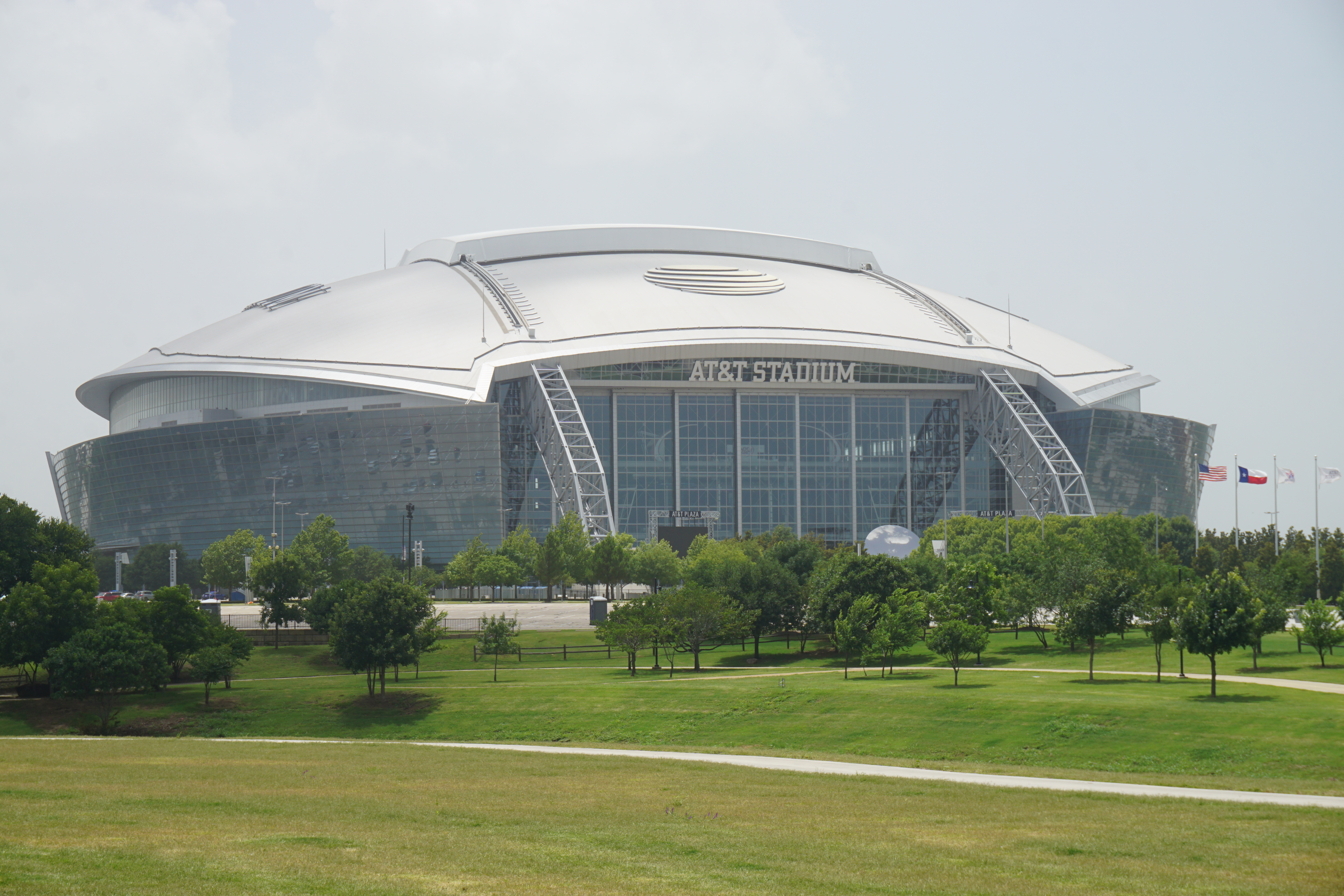
AT&T Stadium, the site of the relocated Rose Bowl

The four teams competing in the Playoff were chosen by the CFP selection committee, whose final rankings were released on December 4, 2022. The committee selected No. 1 Alabama from the Southeastern Conference (SEC), No. 2 Clemson from the Atlantic Coast Conference (ACC), No. 3 Ohio State from the Big Ten Conference, and No. 4 Notre Dame, an FBS independent playing as an ACC member for the 2020 season. Alabama entered the playoff with an undefeated 11–0 record, Clemson and Notre Dame both entered 10–1, and Ohio State entered 6–0.

Semifinals
January 1 – Rose Bowl AT&T Stadium, Arlington (Note: The 2021 Rose Bowl was moved to AT&T Stadium in Arlington, Texas, due to the COVID-19 pandemic in California.)
1 | Alabama | 31
4 | Notre Dame | 14
January 1 – Sugar Bowl Mercedes-Benz Superdome, New Orleans
2 | Clemson | 28
3 | Ohio State | 49

Championship
January 11 – National Championship Hard Rock Stadium, Miami Gardens
1 | Alabama | 52
3 | Ohio State | 24

== Teams ==
Teams for the game were selected by the College Football Playoff selection committee and announced on December 20, 2020. The game matched top-ranked Alabama and fourth-ranked Notre Dame. In seven prior meetings, Notre Dame held a 5–2 edge; the programs had most recently played in the 2013 BCS National Championship Game, which Alabama won by a score of 42–14.

=== Alabama Crimson Tide ===
Alabama entered the bowl with an 11–0 record, having won all 10 of their Southeastern Conference (SEC) regular season games, followed by a win over Florida in the SEC Championship Game. The Crimson Tide had last appeared in a CFP semifinal game following the 2018 season, when they defeated Oklahoma in the Orange Bowl. Alabama had previously appeared in six Rose Bowl games, most recently in 1946, with a record of 4–1–1.

=== Notre Dame Fighting Irish ===
Notre Dame entered the bowl with a 10–1 record. The Fighting Irish, who traditionally compete in football as an independent, played the 2020 season as a member of the Atlantic Coast Conference (ACC). Notre Dame defeated nine ACC teams and one non-conference program (South Florida) during the regular season, then lost to Clemson in the ACC Championship Game. The Fighting Irish had last appeared in a CFP semifinal game following the 2018 season, when they lost to Clemson in the Cotton Bowl. The only prior appearance by Notre Dame in the Rose Bowl had been a victory over Stanford in the 1925 edition.

== Game summary ==
College Football Playoff Semifinal at the 2021 Rose Bowl presented by Capital One

| Quarter | 1 | 2 | 3 | 4 | Total |
|---|---|---|---|---|---|
| No. 4 Notre Dame | 0 | 7 | 0 | 7 | 14 |
| No. 1 Alabama | 14 | 7 | 7 | 3 | 31 |

at AT&T Stadium • Arlington, Texas

- Date: January 1, 2021
- Game time: 4:00 p.m. EST (3:00 p.m. CST)
- Game weather: n/a (game played indoors)
- Game attendance: 18,373
- Referee: John O'Neill (Big Ten)
- TV announcers (ESPN): Sean McDonough (play-by-play), Todd Blackledge (analyst), Todd McShay and Allison Williams (sidelines)
- ESPN game summary

Game information

First quarter

- (10:14) BAMA – DeVonta Smith 26 yard pass from Mac Jones, Will Reichard kick (Drive: 7 plays, 79 yards, 2:36; Alabama 7–0)
- (4:19) BAMA – Jahleel Billingsley 12 yard pass from Mac Jones, Will Reichard kick (Drive: 5 plays, 97 yards, 2:11; Alabama 14–0)

Second quarter

- (11:16) ND – Kyren Williams 1 yard rush, Jonathan Doerer kick (Drive: 15 plays, 75 yards, 8:03; Alabama 14–7)
- (8:49) BAMA – DeVonta Smith 34 yard pass from Mac Jones, Will Reichard kick (Drive: 6 plays, 84 yards, 2:21; Alabama 21–7)

Third quarter

- (4:58) BAMA – DeVonta Smith 7 yard pass from Mac Jones, Will Reichard kick (Drive: 5 play, 62 yards, 2:29; Alabama 28–7)

Fourth quarter

- (12:45) BAMA – Will Reichard 41 yard field goal (Drive: 10 plays, 47 yards, 4:20; Alabama 31–7)
- (0:56) ND – Ian Book 1 yard rush, Jonathan Doerer kick (Drive: 14 plays, 80 yards, 4:36; Alabama 31–14)

=== Statistics ===
| Statistics | ND | BAMA |
|---|---|---|
| First downs | 24 | 24 |
| Plays–yards | 80–375 | 55–437 |
| Rushes–yards | 38–139 | 25–140 |
| Passing yards | 236 | 297 |
| Passing: comp–att–int | 28–42–1 | 25–30–0 |
| Turnovers | | |
| Time of possession | 33:43 | 26:17 |

| Team | Category | Player | Statistics |
|---|---|---|---|
| Notre Dame | Passing | Ian Book | 27/39, 229 yards, 1 INT |
| Notre Dame | Rushing | Kyren Williams | 16 carries, 64 yards, 1 TD |
| Notre Dame | Receiving | Michael Mayer | 7 receptions, 62 yards |
| Alabama | Passing | Mac Jones | 25/30, 297 yards, 4 TD |
| Alabama | Rushing | Najee Harris | 15 carries, 125 yards |
| Alabama | Receiving | DeVonta Smith | 7 receptions, 130 yards, 3 TD |

== See also ==
- 2020 Cotton Bowl Classic, played at the same venue two days prior
