= Rhamondre Stevenson =

American football player (born 1998)

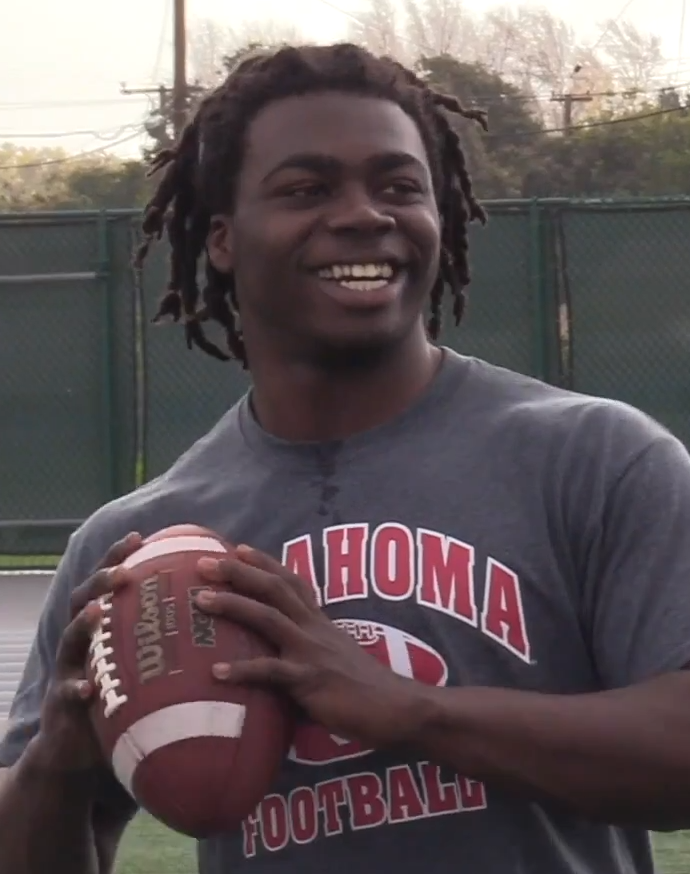
- Stevenson with the Oklahoma Sooners in 2019

No. 38 – New England Patriots
- Position: Running back
- Roster status: Active

Personal information
- Born: February 23, 1998 (age 28); Las Vegas, Nevada, U.S.
- Listed height: 6 ft 0 in (1.83 m)
- Listed weight: 227 lb (103 kg)

Career information
- High school: Centennial (Las Vegas)
- College: Cerritos (2017–2018); Oklahoma (2019–2020)
- NFL draft: 2021: 4th round, 120th overall pick

Career history
- New England Patriots (2021–present)

Awards and highlights
- 2020 Cotton Bowl Classic (MVP)

Career NFL statistics as of Week 10, 2026
- Rushing yards: 4,072
- Rushing average: 4.3
- Rushing touchdowns: 30
- Receptions: 213
- Receiving yards: 1,554
- Receiving touchdowns: 6
- Stats at Pro Football Reference

Rhamondre Stevenson (born February 23, 1998) is an American professional football running back for the New England Patriots of the National Football League (NFL). He played college football for the Oklahoma Sooners, and was selected by the Patriots in the fourth round of the 2021 NFL draft.

== Early life ==
Stevenson attended Centennial High School in Las Vegas, Nevada. As a junior in 2015, he was the Las Vegas Sun High School Player of the Year.

== College career ==
Stevenson played at Cerritos College for two seasons before transferring to the University of Oklahoma. In his first five collegiate games, Stevenson scored a rushing touchdown in each game. In his first season at Oklahoma in 2019, he played in the first 13 games of the season before being suspended for the 2019 Peach Bowl because of a failed drug test for marijuana. He finished the season with 515 yards on 64 carries with six touchdowns. Stevenson returned from the suspension six games into the 2020 season. In his first game back, he had three rushing touchdowns in a 62–28 victory over Texas Tech. He followed that up with 104 rushing yards and two rushing touchdowns to go along with 60 receiving yards in a 62–9 victory over Kansas. Two weeks later, against Oklahoma State, he had 195 scrimmage yards in the 41–13 victory. He was named the MVP of the 2020 Cotton Bowl after rushing for 186 yards and a touchdown on 18 carries.

=== College statistics ===
Year	Team	GP	Rushing				Receiving			
Year	Team	GP	Att	Yds	Avg	TD	Rec	Yds	Avg	TD
2019	Oklahoma	13	64	515	8.0	6	10	87	8.7	0
2020	Oklahoma	6	101	665	6.6	7	18	211	11.7	0
Career		19	165	1,180	7.2	13	28	298	10.6	0

== Professional career ==
Pre-draft measurables
Height	Weight	Arm length	Hand span	Wingspan	40-yard dash	10-yard split	20-yard split	20-yard shuttle	Three-cone drill	Vertical jump	Broad jump	Bench press
5 ft 11 5/8 in (1.82 m)	231 lb (105 kg)	30 1/4 in (0.77 m)	8 3/4 in (0.22 m)	6 ft 2 1/4 in (1.89 m)	4.64 s	1.67 s	2.75 s	4.15 s	7.09 s	31.5 in (0.80 m)	9 ft 4 in (2.84 m)	15 reps
All values from Pro Day

=== 2021 season ===
Stevenson was selected by the New England Patriots in the fourth round, 120th overall, of the 2021 NFL draft. He signed his four-year rookie contract with New England on May 19, 2021.

After being lightly used during the first eight games of the season, Stevenson had a breakout game in week 9 against the Carolina Panthers, with 106 all-purpose yards that included a 41-yard reception on a short out-pattern that set up a Patriots touchdown, before leaving the game with a concussion. The following week versus the Cleveland Browns, with regular starter Damien Harris inactive due to a concussion in the prior week, Stevenson was named the starter. He scored two touchdowns on 100 yards rushing, and added another 14 yards on receptions as New England won 45–7. In Week 11 against the Atlanta Falcons on Thursday Night Football, Stevenson once again led the team in rushing, splitting carries with starter Damien Harris, and ending up with 69 yards on 12 carries in the 25–0 win. He continued to serve as the team's #2 running back behind starter Harris, gaining 46 yards on nine carries in week 13 win against the Tennessee Titans and taking the bulk of the load in a run-heavy win over the Buffalo Bills in week 14, a game in which the Patriots only threw the ball three times, amassing 78 yards on 24 carries. He finished the season with 606 rushing yards and five touchdowns in 12 games and two starts.

=== 2022 season ===
Stevenson had a breakout season in 2022, despite starting the season as the backup to Damien Harris. In Week 5 against the Detroit Lions, Stevenson rushed for 161 yards on 25 carries in a 29–0 win. The following week, in his first start of the season, he rushed for 76 yards and two touchdowns in a 38–15 win over the Browns. In Week 15, he ran for a career-high 172 yards and a touchdown on 19 carries. He finished the season with 1,040 rushing yards and five touchdowns along with a team-leading 69 catches to go with 421 receiving yards and one touchdown.

=== 2023 season ===
In the 2023 season, Stevenson had 156 carries for 619 rushing yards and four rushing touchdowns to go with 38 receptions for 238 receiving yards in 12 games.

=== 2024 season ===
On June 20, 2024, Stevenson signed a four-year, $36 million contract extension that included $17 million guaranteed with the Patriots. On October 4, head coach Jerod Mayo announced that Stevenson had been demoted from his starting role due to fumbling issues. In Week 8 against the New York Jets, Stevenson rushed for 48 yards and two touchdowns, including a game-winner in the 25–22 win. In the 2024 season, he had 207 carries for 801 rushing yards and seven rushing touchdowns to go with 33 receptions for 168 receiving yards and one receiving touchdown.

=== 2025 season ===
Stevenson entered the 2025 season as the starting running back. He suffered a toe injury in Week 8 and missed three games, during which time rookie TreVeyon Henderson took over the starting role, and eventually led to a shared workload as the season progressed. In Week 18, Stevenson had 131 rushing yards and 22 receiving yards with a pair of rushing touchdowns and one receiving score in a 38–10 win over the Miami Dolphins, earning AFC Offensive Player of the Week. He finished the season second behind Henderson with 603 rushing yards and seven touchdowns, along with 32 catches for 345 yards and two touchdowns, helping the Patriots clinch the 2nd seed in the AFC and a 14–3 record.

In a 16–3 win against the Los Angeles Chargers in the Wild Card round, Stevenson had 53 rushing yards and 75 receiving yards, leading the team in receiving yards in the game. In Super Bowl LX, Stevenson had 63 scrimmage yards and a receiving touchdown in the 29–13 loss to the Seattle Seahawks.

=== 2026 season ===
For the 2026 season, the Patriots favored a balanced rushing attack between Stevenson and Henderson. Still, Stevenson was the starting back to begin the year.

In a Week 7 loss to the Chicago Bears, Stevenson recorded just 22 yards on six carries, but had a career-high and team-leading 93 receiving yards including a 48-yard touchdown on the final play of the first half. The Bears had lined up their defensive backs near the goal line to stop a Hail Mary pass, so quarterback Drake Maye tossed the ball to Stevenson near the line of scrimmage and he outmaneuvered the Chicago defense for the score.

== NFL career statistics ==
Legend
**Bold**	Career High

=== Regular season ===
Year	Team	Games		Rushing					Receiving					Fumbles	
Year	Team	GP	GS	Att	Yds	Avg	Lng	TD	Rec	Yds	Avg	Lng	TD	Fum	Lost
2021	NE	12	2	133	606	4.6	21	5	14	123	8.8	41	0	2	1
2022	NE	17	7	**210**	**1,040**	**5.0**	49	5	**69**	**421**	6.1	40	1	4	1
2023	NE	12	12	156	619	4.0	**64**	4	38	238	6.3	34	0	1	1
2024	NE	15	14	207	801	3.9	33	**7**	33	168	5.1	16	1	**7**	**3**
2025	NE	14	13	130	603	4.6	56	**7**	32	345	**10.8**	**55**	**2**	3	**3**
2026	NE	10	10	108	403	3.7	24	2	27	259	9.6	48	2	2	1
Career		80	58	944	4,072	4.3	64	30	213	1,554	7.3	55	6	19	10

=== Postseason ===
Year	Team	Games		Rushing					Receiving					Fumbles	
Year	Team	GP	GS	Att	Yds	Avg	Lng	TD	Rec	Yds	Avg	Lng	TD	Fum	Lost
2021	NE	1	0	8	27	3.4	8	0	4	33	8.3	15	0	0	0
2025	NE	3	3	**51**	**194**	**3.8**	**20**	0	**7**	**86**	**12.2**	**48**	1	0	0
Career		4	3	59	221	3.7	20	0	11	119	10.8	48	0	0	0
