= Tre Norwood =

American football player (born 1999)

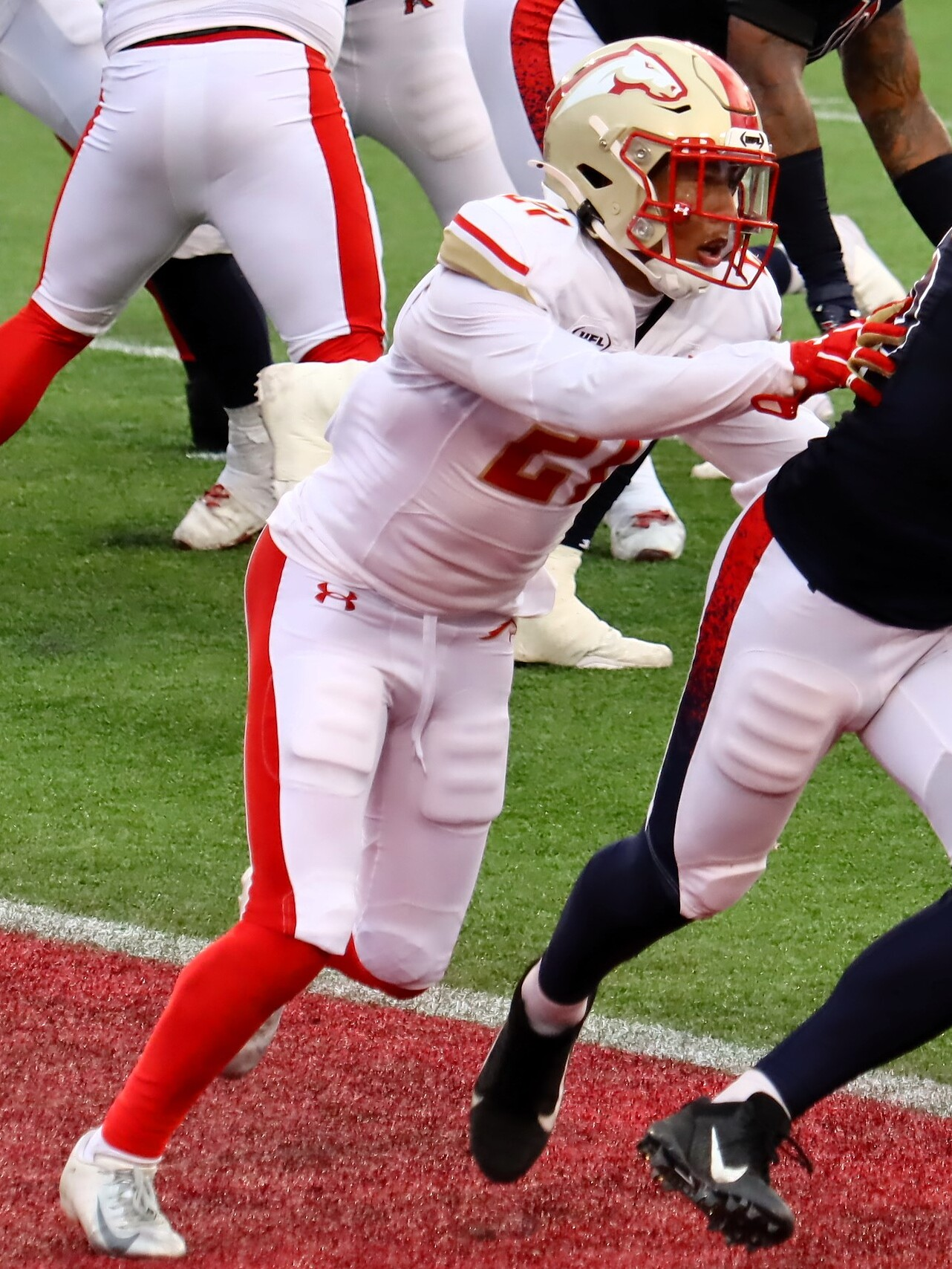
- Norwood with the Birmingham Stallions in 2025

No. 21 – Rhode Island Breakers
- Position: Safety
- Roster status: Active

Personal information
- Born: April 19, 1999 (age 27); Fort Smith, Arkansas, U.S.
- Listed height: 6 ft 0 in (1.83 m)
- Listed weight: 199 lb (90 kg)

Career information
- High school: Northside (Fort Smith)
- College: Oklahoma (2017–2020)
- NFL draft: 2021: 7th round, 245th overall pick

Career history
- Pittsburgh Steelers (2021–2022); San Francisco 49ers (2023)*; Buffalo Bills (2023)*; Birmingham Stallions (2025–2026); Rhode Island Breakers (2027–present)
- * Offseason or practice squad member only

Career NFL statistics
- Total tackles: 61
- Pass deflections: 4
- Interceptions: 1
- Stats at Pro Football Reference

Tre Norwood (born April 19, 1999) is an American football safety for the Rhode Island Breakers of the United Football League (UFL). He played college football at Oklahoma, and was selected by the Steelers in the seventh round of the 2021 NFL draft.

== College career ==
In July 2016, he committed to play college football for Louisville; in January 2017, he de-committed from Louisville.

Norwood played college football at Oklahoma from 2017 to 2020.

== Professional career ==
Pre-draft measurables
Height	Weight	Arm length	Hand span	Wingspan	40-yard dash	10-yard split	20-yard split	20-yard shuttle	Three-cone drill	Vertical jump	Broad jump	Bench press
5 ft 11 5/8 in (1.82 m)	192 lb (87 kg)	29 3/8 in (0.75 m)	9 3/8 in (0.24 m)	6 ft 0 1/4 in (1.84 m)	4.57 s	1.59 s	2.66 s	4.45 s	7.65 s	33.5 in (0.85 m)	10 ft 3 in (3.12 m)	12 reps
All values from Pro Day

=== Pittsburgh Steelers ===
Norwood was selected by the Pittsburgh Steelers in the seventh round, 245th overall, of the 2021 NFL draft. On May 15, 2021, he signed his four-year rookie contract with Pittsburgh.

On August 29, 2023, Norwood was waived by the Steelers.

=== San Francisco 49ers ===
On September 27, 2023, Norwood signed with the practice squad of the San Francisco 49ers. He was released on October 24.

=== Buffalo Bills ===
On November 7, 2023, Norwood was signed by the Buffalo Bills to their practice squad. He was released on December 30.

=== Birmingham Stallions ===
On August 16, 2024, Norwood signed with the Birmingham Stallions of the United Football League (UFL).
