= 2022 Sugar Bowl (January) =

Postseason college football bowl game

2022 Allstate Sugar Bowl
- CFP New Year's Six; 88th Sugar Bowl
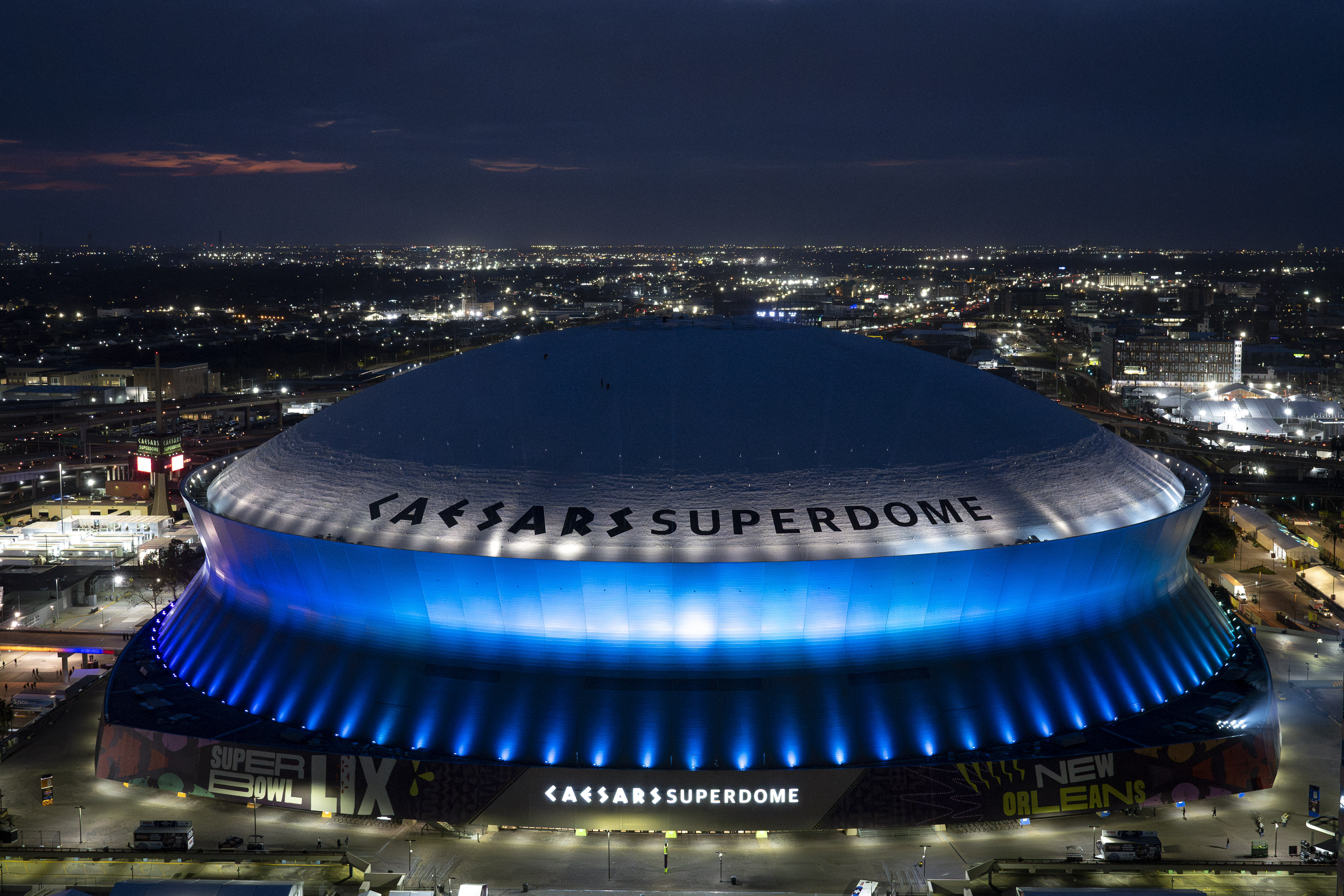
- Caesars Superdome in New Orleans, Louisiana, hosted the Sugar Bowl.
Baylor Bears	Ole Miss Rebels
(11–2)	(10–2)
Big 12	SEC
21	7
Head coach: Dave Aranda	Head coach: Lane Kiffin
AP / Coaches / CFP; 6 / 6 / 7	AP / Coaches / CFP; 8 / 8 / 8
	1	2	3	4	Total
Baylor	0	7	0	14	21
Ole Miss	0	0	7	0	7
- Date: January 1, 2022
- Season: 2021
- Stadium: Caesars Superdome
- Location: New Orleans, Louisiana
- MVP: Terrel Bernard (LB, Baylor)
- Favorite: Ole Miss by 1
- Referee: Ron Snodgrass (Big Ten)
- Attendance: 66,479

United States TV coverage
- Network: ESPN; ESPN Radio
- Announcers: ESPN: Joe Tessitore (play-by-play), Greg McElroy (analyst), and Katie George (sideline); ESPN Radio: Sean Kelley (play-by-play), Barrett Jones (analyst), and Ian Fitzsimmons (sideline)
- Nielsen ratings: 9.8 million viewers

The 2022 Sugar Bowl was a college football bowl game played on January 1, 2022, with kickoff at 8:45 p.m. EST (7:45 p.m. local CST) and televised on ESPN. It was the 88th edition of the Sugar Bowl, and was one of the 2021–22 bowl games concluding the 2021 FBS football season. Sponsored by insurance company Allstate, the game was officially known as the Allstate Sugar Bowl.

== Teams ==
Consistent with conference tie-ins, the game was played between teams from the Big 12 Conference and the Southeastern Conference (SEC).

This was the second meeting between Baylor and Ole Miss; the Bears defeated the Rebels, 20–10, in Waco on September 6, 1975, these teams' only prior meeting.

=== Baylor Bears ===
Baylor completed their regular season with a 10–2 overall record, 7–2 in Big 12 games. Their losses came to Oklahoma State and TCU. The Bears defeated three ranked teams during the regular season: Iowa State, BYU, and Oklahoma. Baylor then faced Oklahoma State again, in the 2021 Big 12 Championship Game. While Oklahoma State had won their first meeting, 24–14, the Bears won the title contest, 21–16. Baylor entered the Sugar Bowl with an overall 11–2 record, ranked sixth in the AP Poll and seventh in the College Football Playoff (CFP) rankings.

=== Ole Miss Rebels ===
Ole Miss completed their regular season with a 10–2 overall record, 6–2 in SEC games. The Rebels lost to Alabama and Auburn, and defeated two ranked teams in FBS, Arkansas and Texas A&M. Ole Miss entered the Sugar Bowl ranked eighth in all major polls.

Quarterback Matt Corral was injured early in the first quarter and did not return to the game.

== Game summary ==
2022 Allstate Sugar Bowl

Quarter	1	2	3	4	Total
No. 7 Baylor	0	7	0	14	21
No. 8 Ole Miss	0	0	7	0	7

at Caesars Superdome • New Orleans, Louisiana

- Date: Saturday, January 1, 2022
- Game time: 9:00 p.m. EST (8:00 p.m. CST)
- Game weather: n/a (domed stadium)
- Game attendance: 66,479
- Referee: Ron Snodgrass
- TV announcers (ESPN): Joe Tessitore (play-by-play), Greg McElroy (analyst), and Katie George (sideline)
- Box score

Scoring summary

Quarter	Time	Drive			Team	Scoring information	Score	
Quarter	Time	Plays	Yards	TOP	Team	Scoring information	Baylor	Ole Miss
2	10:16				Baylor	Interception returned 96 yards for touchdown by Al Walcott, Isaiah Hankins kick good	7	0
3	9:13	6	72	1:48	Ole Miss	Braylon Sanders 37-yard touchdown reception from Luke Altmyer, Cale Nation kick good	7	7
4	11:14	5	80	1:55	Baylor	Monaray Baldwin 48-yard touchdown run, Isaiah Hankins kick good	14	7
4	7:24	5	15	2:34	Baylor	Tyquan Thornton 2-yard touchdown reception from Gerry Bohanon, Isaiah Hankins kick good	21	7
"TOP" = time of possession. For other American football terms, see Glossary of American football.							21	7

=== Statistics ===
Statistics	BAY	MISS
First downs	12	20
Plays–yards	58–319	88–322
Rushes–yards	41–279	54–138
Passing yards	40	184
Passing: comp–att–int	7–17–1	17–34–3
Turnovers		
Time of possession	28:24	31:36

Team	Category	Player	Statistics
Baylor	Passing	Gerry Bohanon	7/17, 40 yards, TD, INT
Baylor	Rushing	Abram Smith	25 carries, 172 yards
Baylor	Receiving	Drew Estrada	2 receptions, 14 yards
Ole Miss	Passing	Luke Altmyer	15/28, 174 yards, TD, 2 INT
Ole Miss	Rushing	Jerrion Ealy	12 carries, 65 yards
Ole Miss	Receiving	Dontario Drummond	9 receptions, 104 yards
