= Dave Aranda =

American football coach (born 1976)

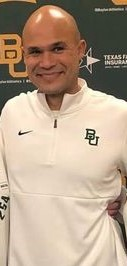

Biographical details
- Born: September 29, 1976 (age 50); Kern County, California, U.S.
- Education: California Lutheran (BA); Texas Tech (MS)

Coaching career (HC unless noted)
- 1995: Redlands HS (CA) (JV)
- 1996–1999: Cal Lutheran (LB)
- 2000–2002: Texas Tech (GA)
- 2003–2004: Houston (LB)
- 2005–2006: Cal Lutheran (DC/LB)
- 2007: Delta State (co-DC/LB)
- 2008–2009: Hawaii (DL)
- 2010–2011: Hawaii (DC)
- 2012: Utah State (DC)
- 2013–2015: Wisconsin (DC/ILB)
- 2016–2019: LSU (AHC/DC/LB)
- 2020–2026: Baylor

Head coaching record
- Overall: 40–40
- Bowls: 1–2

Accomplishments and honors

Championships
- 1 Big 12 (2021)

Awards
- AP Big 12 Coach of the Year (2021); Paul “Bear” Bryant Awards program's Big 12 Coach of the Year (2021); George Munger Award (2021)

David Christopher Aranda (born September 29, 1976) is an American football coach. He was most recently the head football coach at Baylor University, a position he held from 2020 to 2026. He previously also served as the defensive coordinator at LSU, Wisconsin, Utah State, Hawaii, Delta State, and Cal Lutheran.

== Early life ==
Born in Southern California to Mexican immigrant parents from Guadalajara, Aranda graduated from Redlands High School in Redlands, California in 1994, where he was a linebacker.

== Coaching career ==
=== Early coaching career ===
After high school, Aranda retired from playing football due to injuries, so he became an assistant coach at Redlands High in 1995. He tried to join the U.S. Navy, but his football injuries—specifically the aftereffects of a shoulder fracture he had suffered in high school—caused him to fail the physical. While coaching at his old high school, he also worked night shifts as a security guard. During this time, Aranda visited a friend who was attending California Lutheran University, and soon enrolled there in an attempt to return to play. While his injuries made it impossible for him to play, he got an opportunity to become a student assistant while an undergraduate, serving as linebackers coach for the Kingsmen from 1996 to 1999. Aranda was also the roommate of Tom Herman. Aranda graduated from Cal Lutheran in 1999 with a bachelor's degree in philosophy. He also sought out coaches to talk about the profession, and became enamored with the book Thinking Body, Dancing Mind by sports psychologist Jerry Lynch, who has consulted with numerous championship teams in several sports and whose thinking has influenced coaches such as Phil Jackson and Steve Kerr.

In 2000, Aranda enrolled in graduate school at Texas Tech University and served as a graduate assistant for Texas Tech Red Raiders football from 2000 to 2002 under Mike Leach. While back in Southern California during an offseason break in 2001, Aranda cold-called Leach and asked for a face-to-face meeting with him in Santa Cruz, about 300 miles from Redlands. In a 2022 ESPN story, Lynch, who normally works with teams instead of individuals, recalled, "There was something about Dave when he contacted me. I felt, through his words, a sense of being genuine, authentic and vulnerable. Those are the three keys that attract me to people. It's almost like, OK, I don't want to let this opportunity go by so I saw it as an opportunity for me to learn about this young man." Aranda spent three days with Leach, and they have maintained their relationship ever since, with Aranda having written the foreword to Leach's 13th book, Everyday Champion Wisdom.

From 2003 to 2004, Aranda was linebackers coach at Houston. He then returned to Cal Lutheran as defensive coordinator and linebackers coach, positions he held for the 2005 and 2006 seasons. In 2007, Aranda was defensive coordinator and secondary coach for Delta State.

=== Hawaii ===
Following stints at California Lutheran and Delta State University, in 2008 he was tapped by his coaching mentor, Greg McMackin, to serve as the defensive line coach for the University of Hawaii Warriors. In Aranda's first season, he cultivated a talented unit that included David Veikune, Joshua Leonard and Keala Watson. In 2009, Aranda was credited with developing a creative defensive scheme that stymied Navy's vaunted rushing attack and allowed the Warriors to earn a 24–17 victory over a Midshipmen squad that defeated Notre Dame two weeks earlier. The following year he was elevated to defensive coordinator. He helped lead the Warriors to victory in nine of their last ten regular season games. In those wins, Aranda's opportunistic defense limited the opposition to 16.1 points per game, only allowed 2.4 yards per rush and held Colin Kaepernick in check en route to handing the Nevada Wolf Pack its only loss of the season. Under Aranda's guidance the Warriors led the nation in turnovers caused (38) and tied a school record for most defensive touchdowns (5).

Although the Warriors struggled to a 6–7 record in 2011, Aranda's defense was particularly impressive in a 34–17 drubbing of Colorado. Leading up to the game, Colorado coach Jon Embree boasted that as to Hawaii's defense, the Buffaloes were going to "run the ball down their throat." Aranda, who later acknowledged that he took Embree's comment personally, met the challenge head on and limited the boastful Buffaloes to just 17 net rushing yards on the night. For the year, Aranda's defense led the Western Athletic Conference and was tied for 15th in the FBS in sacks (35). At the conclusion of the season, he found himself on the wrong-side of the ledger and was fired after head coach Greg McMackin resigned. Despite the circumstances, Aranda said later "I miss the family atmosphere there. I miss the people."

=== Utah State ===
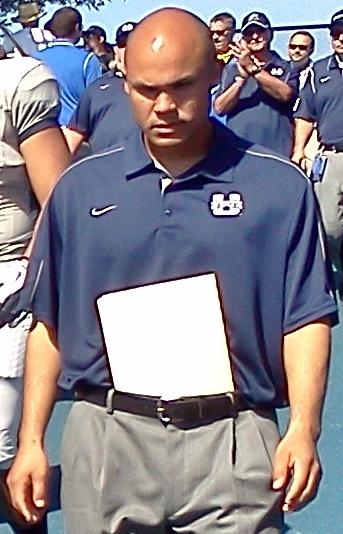
Dave Aranda at Utah State

In 2012, Aranda was the defensive coordinator for one year for the Utah State Aggies under Gary Andersen. That same year he was a nominee for the Broyles Award as the Aggies defense finished in the top 15 of all FBS schools in all four major defensive categories; seventh in scoring defense (15.4 points per game), 13th in rushing defense (113.8 yards per game), eighth in pass-efficiency defense (14 interceptions, 12 touchdowns, 54.1% completion rate, 5.7 yards per attempt) and 14th in total defense (322.1 ypg).

=== Wisconsin ===
When Gary Andersen was hired as the new Wisconsin Badgers head coach, following the 2012 football season, Aranda followed him to Wisconsin. Aranda turned down offers from Texas Tech and California. Aranda changed the Badgers' base defense from a 4–3 to a 3–4 and developed a more aggressive defense, putting pressure on the quarterback. His first year as defensive coordinator the Badgers defense ranked in the top 20 in all four major defensive categories; scoring defense (6th), total defense (7th), rushing defense (5th) and passing defense (17th).

Week 10 of the 2014 football season Aranda was named Coordinator of the Week by Athlon Sports after his Wisconsin Badgers defense shutout Rutgers Scarlet Knights 37–0. It was Wisconsin's first road shutout since 1998. The Badgers took 1st place in the West Division with a 10–2 record, going 7–1 in the conference. Wisconsin played Ohio State for the conference title in the 2014 Big Ten Championship Game where the Badgers lost to Ohio State 59–0. It was the first time since 1997 that the Badgers were shutout and the worst loss since 1979 when Ohio State also defeated the Badgers 59–0.

Four days after the Badgers lost to Ohio State, Gary Andersen departed Wisconsin for Oregon State. Former Badgers offensive coordinator (2005–2011) and Pitt head coach (2012–2014), Paul Chryst, was hired as the next head coach of the Badgers. Aranda was the only assistant coach to remain on the coaching staff after Andersen's departure.

Two of Aranda's three years at Wisconsin one of his linebackers won the Big Ten Linebacker of the Year, Chris Borland in 2013 and Joe Schobert in 2015. Borland also won Big Ten Defensive Player of the Year in 2013. Aranda alongside his OLB coach Tim Tibesar were named Linebacker Coaches of the Year for 2015 by FootballScoop. Over Aranda's three-year span as defensive coordinator at Wisconsin his defense ranked first nationally in total defense, second in scoring defense, third in pass defense and fourth in run defense. His final season with the Badgers his defense came in first in scoring defense, allowing just 13.1 points per game.

=== LSU ===
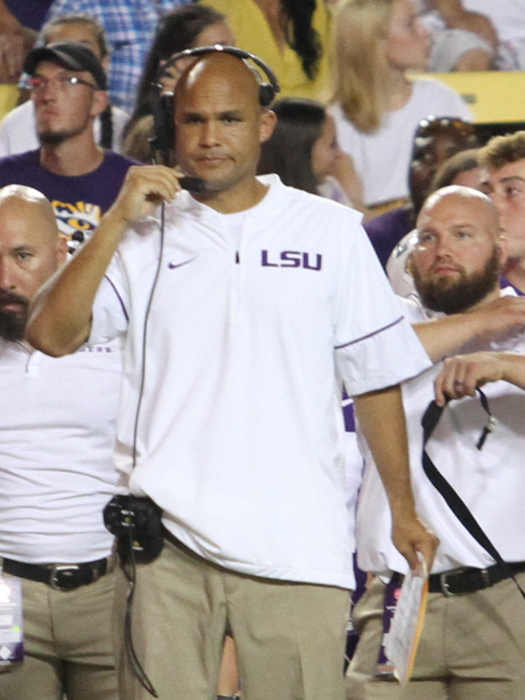
Aranda at LSU

On January 1, 2016, it was announced that Aranda was hired to replace Kevin Steele as defensive coordinator for the LSU Tigers. The move to LSU saw his starting salary more than double from $520,000 to $1.3 million. His contract was guaranteed for three years and was not tied to the contract of LSU head coach Ed Orgeron. On January 5, 2018, it was announced that Aranda received a new four-year contract that will pay him $2.5 million annually and the entire $10 million deal is guaranteed. Aranda was also given the title Associate head coach. This was in response to several attempts by Texas A&M to hire Aranda. In 2019 season, he won a championship with LSU.

=== Baylor ===
On January 16, 2020, Aranda was named the head coach at Baylor University, replacing Matt Rhule, who left to become the head coach of the Carolina Panthers.

==== 2020–2026 ====
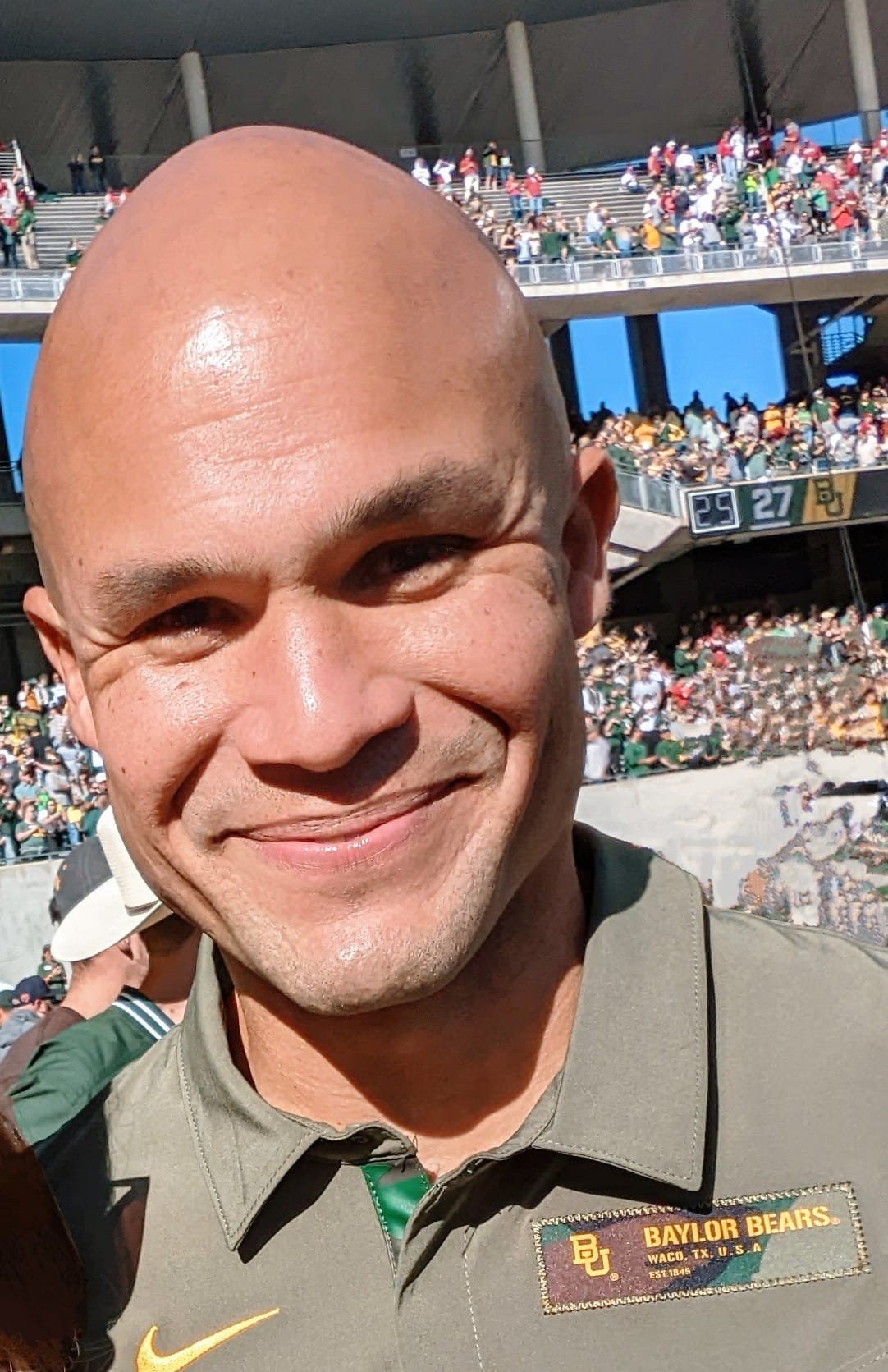
Dave Aranda after beating Oklahoma 27–14 on November 13, 2021.

In the spring of 2020, Aranda was tasked with navigating the 2020 Baylor Bears football team through the COVID-19 pandemic. The Bears' spring practices as well as the Baylor football spring "Green and Gold game" were canceled due to the COVID-19 pandemic, leaving first time head coach Aranda and his new team without practice prior to entering the 2020 football season. Aranda finished the 2020 season 2–7 overall, and 2–7 in Big 12 play. After the season concluded, Aranda and Baylor parted ways with the Bears' first year offensive coordinator, Larry Fedora, and then later hired Jeff Grimes from Brigham Young University for the same role.

In 2021, Aranda led the Bears to their best season in school history. The Bears were ranked in the top 25 for the majority of the 2021 football season and finished with a 12–2 record (7–2 in Big 12 play), the most wins in program history. In the 2021 Big 12 Championship Game, Aranda and the Bears beat Oklahoma State 21–16 on an iconic goal line stand to win Baylor's 3rd Big 12 football championship. The season ended with a historic Sugar Bowl win where they beat Ole Miss 21-7. Aranda won the AP Big 12 Coach of the Year (2021), the Paul “Bear” Bryant Awards program's Big 12 Coach of the Year, and was the first Baylor football coach to win the George Munger Award. Aranda was also a finalist for many other national awards, including the 2021 Eddie Robinson Award, Bobby Dodd Coach of the Year Award, Associated Press College Football Coach of the Year Award, and Paul "Bear" Bryant Award for National Coach of the Year.

In 2026, Aranda was fired on October 25 after a 25–24 loss to Kansas the previous day.

=== Statistics ===
Team defensive statistics where Aranda was defensive coordinator.

		Total Defense	Passing Defense	Rushing Defense	Ref
2010	Hawaii	82nd	100th	57th	
2011	Hawaii	73rd	92nd	53rd	
2012	Utah State	15th	39th	15th	
2013	Wisconsin	9th	25th	5th	
2014	Wisconsin	9th	9th	24th	
2015	Wisconsin	2nd	5th	4th	
2016	LSU	5th	14th	10th	
2017	LSU	12th	21st	24th	
2018	LSU	30th	44th	38th	
2019	LSU	32nd	57th	24th	

== Head coaching record ==
Year	Team	Overall	Conference	Standing	Bowl/playoffs	Coaches^{#}	AP^{°}
Baylor Bears (Big 12 Conference) (2020–2026)
2020	Baylor	2–7	2–7	9th			
2021	Baylor	12–2	7–2	1st	W Sugar^{†}	6	5
2022	Baylor	6–7	4–5	T–5th	L Armed Forces		
2023	Baylor	3–9	2–7	T–11th			
2024	Baylor	8–5	6–3	T–5th	L Texas		
2025	Baylor	5–7	3–6	T–11th			
2026	Baylor	4–3 (Note: Baylor fired Aranda after 7 games.)	2–2				
Baylor:		40–40	26–32				
Total:		40–40					
National championship Conference title Conference division title or championship game berth
^{†}Indicates CFP / New Years' Six bowl.; ^{#}Rankings from final Coaches Poll.; ^{°}Rankings from final AP Poll.

== Personal life ==
Aranda is a Christian. He is married to Dione Aranda. They have two daughters and one son.
