= 2021 Ole Miss Rebels football team =

American college football season

2021 Ole Miss Rebels football

Sugar Bowl, L 7–21 vs. Baylor
- Conference: Southeastern Conference
- Western Division

Ranking
- Coaches: No. 11
- AP: No. 11
- Record: 10–3 (6–2 SEC)
- Head coach: Lane Kiffin (2nd season)
- Offensive coordinator: Jeff Lebby (2nd season)
- Offensive scheme: Veer and shoot
- Co-defensive coordinators: D. J. Durkin (2nd season); Chris Partridge (2nd season)
- Base defense: 4–3
- Home stadium: Vaught–Hemingway Stadium

2021 Southeastern Conference football standings
	Conf.			Overall
Team	W		L	W		L
Eastern Division
No. 1 Georgia x#^	8	–	0	14	–	1
No. 18 Kentucky*	5	–	3	10	–	3
Tennessee	4	–	4	7	–	6
Missouri	3	–	5	6	–	7
South Carolina	3	–	5	7	–	6
Florida	2	–	6	6	–	7
Vanderbilt	0	–	8	2	–	10
Western Division
No. 2 Alabama x$^	7	–	1	13	–	2
No. 11 Ole Miss	6	–	2	10	–	3
No. 21 Arkansas	4	–	4	9	–	4
Mississippi State	4	–	4	7	–	6
Texas A&M	4	–	4	8	–	4
Auburn	3	–	5	6	–	7
LSU	3	–	5	6	–	7
Championship: Alabama 41, Georgia 24
# – College Football Playoff champion; ^ – College Football Playoff participant; $ – Conference champion; x – Division champion/co-champions; * – Kentucky vacated all wins due to NCAA violations.; Rankings from AP Poll

The 2021 Ole Miss Rebels football team represented the University of Mississippi in the 2021 NCAA Division I FBS football season. The Rebels played their home games at Vaught–Hemingway Stadium in Oxford, Mississippi, and competed in the Western Division of the Southeastern Conference (SEC). They were led by second-year head coach Lane Kiffin. This was the first season in program history that the team finished the regular season with 10 wins.

== SEC Media Days ==
In the preseason media poll, Ole Miss was predicted to finish 4th in the West Division.

== Regular season ==
=== Schedule ===
Date	Time	Opponent	Rank	Site	TV	Result	Attendance
September 6	7:00 p.m.	vs. Louisville*		Mercedes-Benz Stadium; Atlanta, GA (Chick-fil-A Kickoff Game)	ESPN	W 43–24	30,709
September 11	6:30 p.m.	No. 17 (FCS) Austin Peay*	No. 20	Vaught–Hemingway Stadium; Oxford, MS	ESPN+/SECN+	W 54–17	47,848
September 18	8:45 p.m.	Tulane*	No. 17	Vaught–Hemingway Stadium; Oxford, MS (rivalry)	ESPN2	W 61–21	54,198
October 2	2:30 p.m.	at No. 1 Alabama	No. 12	Bryant–Denny Stadium; Tuscaloosa, AL (rivalry / SEC Nation)	CBS	L 21–42	100,077
October 9	11:00 a.m.	No. 13 Arkansas^{†}	No. 17	Vaught–Hemingway Stadium; Oxford, MS (rivalry)	ESPN	W 52–51	60,256
October 16	6:30 p.m.	at Tennessee	No. 13	Neyland Stadium; Knoxville, TN (rivalry)	SECN	W 31–26	102,455
October 23	2:30 p.m.	LSU	No. 12	Vaught–Hemingway Stadium (Magnolia Bowl / SEC Nation)	CBS	W 31–17	64,523
October 30	6:00 p.m.	at No. 18 Auburn	No. 10	Jordan–Hare Stadium; Auburn, AL (rivalry)	ESPN	L 20–31	87,451
November 6	11:00 a.m.	Liberty*	No. 16	Vaught–Hemingway Stadium; Oxford, MS	SECN	W 27–14	53,235
November 13	6:00 p.m.	No. 11 Texas A&M	No. 15	Vaught–Hemingway Stadium; Oxford, MS (College GameDay)	ESPN	W 29–19	64,425
November 20	6:30 p.m.	Vanderbilt	No. 12	Vaught–Hemingway Stadium; Oxford, MS (rivalry)	SECN	W 31–17	50,819
November 25	6:30 p.m.	at Mississippi State	No. 9	Davis Wade Stadium; Starkville, MS (Egg Bowl)	ESPN	W 31–21	55,601
January 1, 2022	7:45 p.m.	vs. No. 7 Baylor*	No. 8	Caesars Superdome; New Orleans, LA (Sugar Bowl)	ESPN	L 7–21	66,479
*Non-conference game; ^{†}Homecoming; Rankings from AP Poll (and CFP Rankings, after November 2) - Released prior to game; All times are in Central time

Schedule source:

== Rankings ==
Ranking movements Legend: ██ Increase in ranking ██ Decrease in ranking RV = Received votes
	Week															
Poll	Pre	1	2	3	4	5	6	7	8	9	10	11	12	13	14	Final
AP	RV	20	17	13	12	17	13	12	10	15	12	10	8	8	8	11
Coaches	25	20	16	13	12	17	14	12	9	15	12	10	8	8	8	11
CFP	Not released									16	15	12	9	8	8	Not released

== Game summaries ==
=== Vs. Louisville ===
Uniform Combination
Helmet	Jersey	Pants

Louisville Cardinals (0–0) vs. Ole Miss Rebels (0–0)

Quarter	1	2	3	4	Total
Rebels	9	17	3	14	43
Cardinals	0	0	10	14	24

at Mercedes-Benz Stadium • Atlanta, GA

- Date: Monday, September 6, 2021
- Game time: 7:00 p.m. CST (8:00 p.m. local EST)
- Game weather: Open Roof • Temperature: 78 °F (26 °C)
- Game attendance: 30,709
- Referee: Ron Snodgrass
- TV announcers (ESPN):
  Rece Davis (play-by-play)
  Kirk Herbstreit (color)
  Molly McGrath (sideline)

Game information

First Quarter

- (11:55) MISS – Jerrion Ealy 1 yard rush, Cale Nation PAT missed
  Ole Miss 6–0; 11 plays, 94 yards, 3:05
- (2:25) MISS – Caden Costa 47 yard field goal
  Ole Miss 9–0; 7 plays, 44 yards, 2:46

Second Quarter

- (11:25) MISS – Matt Corral 6 yard rush, Caden Costa kick
  Ole Miss 16–0; 9 plays, 93 yards, 2:30
- (7:12) MISS – Snoop Conner 1 yard rush, Caden Costa kick
  Ole Miss 23–0; 3 plays, 35 yards, 0:55
- (0:00) MISS – Caden Costa 22 yard field goal
  Ole Miss 26–0; 7 plays, 70 yards, 0:44

Third Quarter

- (12:35) LOU – James Turner 38 yard field goal
  Ole Miss 26–3; 5 plays, 21 yards, 2:25
- (8:22) MISS – Caden Costa 38 yard field goal
  Ole Miss 29–3; 13 plays, 55 yards, 4:13
- (1:58) LOU – Braden Smith 4 yard pass from Malik Cunningham, James Turner kick
  Ole Miss 29–10; 13 plays, 70 yards, 6:24

Fourth Quarter

- (14:11) MISS – Snoop Conner 11 yard rush, Caden Costa kick
  Ole Miss 36–10; 7 plays, 75 yards, 2:47
- (8:58) LOU – Malik Cunningham 1 yard rush, James Turner kick
  Ole Miss 36–17; 11 plays, 94 yards, 3:05
- (7:11) MISS – Dontario Drummond 6 yard pass from Matt Corral, Caden Costa kick
  Ole Miss 43–17; 6 plays, 60 yards, 1:47
- (3:58) LOU – Malik Cunningham 9 yard rush, James Turner kick
  Ole Miss 43–24; 9 plays, 78 yards, 3:13

Statistics	MISS	LOU
First downs	31	22
Total yards	569	355
Passing yards	381	200
Rushing yards	188	155
Penalties	14–125	9–74
Turnovers	0	2
Time of possession	24:08	35:52

Team	Category	Player	Statistics
Ole Miss	Passing	Matt Corral	22/32, 381 yards, 1 TD
Ole Miss	Rushing	Snoop Conner	8 carries, 60 yards, 2 TD
Ole Miss	Receiving	Dontario Drummond	9 receptions, 177 yards, 1 TD
Louisville	Passing	Malik Cunningham	22/37, 191 yards, 1 TD, 1 INT
Louisville	Rushing	Malik Cunningham	18 carries, 79 yards, 2 TD
Louisville	Receiving	Marshon Ford	4 receptions, 50 yards

=== No. 17 (FCS) Austin Peay ===
Uniform Combination
Helmet	Jersey	Pants

No. 17 (FCS) Austin Peay Governors (1–0) at No. 20 Ole Miss Rebels (0–0)

Quarter	1	2	3	4	Total
Governors	0	7	3	7	17
No. 20 Rebels	14	23	14	3	54

at Vaught–Hemingway Stadium • Oxford, MS

- Date: Saturday, September 11, 2021
- Game time: 6:30 p.m. CST
- Game weather: Sunny • Temperature: 79 °F (26 °C)
- Game attendance: 47,848
- Referee: David Smith
- TV announcers (ESPN+):
  Richard Cross (play-by-play)
  Ben Hartsock (color)

Game information

First Quarter

- (11:26) MISS – Dontario Drummond 1 yard pass from Matt Corral, Caden Costa kick
  Ole Miss 7–0; 10 plays, 80 yards, 2:38
- (4:59) MISS – Sam Williams 33 yard fumble return, Caden Costa kick
  Ole Miss 14–0

Second Quarter

- (8:28) MISS – Jonathan Mingo 15 yard pass from Matt Corral, Caden Costa kick
  Ole Miss 21–0; 7 plays, 66 yards, 2:01
- (6:04) MISS – Austin Peay fumbled snap through endzone
  Ole Miss 23–0
- (4:51) MISS – Dontario Drummond 49 yard pass from Matt Corral, Caden Costa kick
  Ole Miss 30–0; 4 plays, 57 yards, 1:03
- (3:03) MISS – Braylon Sanders 11 yard pass from Matt Corral, Caden Costa kick
  Ole Miss 37–0; 6 plays, 28 yards, 1:39
- (2:04) APSU – Baniko Harley 30 yard pass from Draylen Ellis, Maddux Trujillo kick
  Ole Miss 37–7; 3 plays, 75 yards, 0:59

Third Quarter

- (13:46) MISS – Jonathan Mingo 40 yard pass from Matt Corral, Caden Costa kick
  Ole Miss 44–7; 4 plays, 75 yards, 1:14
- (11:21) APSU – Maddux Trujillo 30 yard field goal
  Ole Miss 44–10; 8 plays, 62 yards, 2:25
- (7:13) MISS – Snoop Conner 3 yard rush, Caden Costa kick
  Ole Miss 51–10; 8 plays, 56 yards, 4:06

Fourth Quarter

- (6:14) MISS – Caden Costa 26 yard field goal
  Ole Miss 54–10; 12 plays, 72 yards, 5:46
- (3:12) APSU – CJ Evans Jr. 40 yard rush, Maddux Trujillo kick
  Ole Miss 54–17; 6 plays, 81 yards, 2:49

Statistics	APSU	MISS
First downs	26	29
Total yards	404	630
Passing yards	260	294
Rushing yards	144	336
Penalties	3–15	12–130
Turnovers	2	1
Time of possession	30:21	29:39

Team	Category	Player	Statistics
Austin Peay	Passing	Draylen Ellis	22/40, 226 yards, 1 TD
Austin Peay	Rushing	CJ Evans Jr.	7 carries, 74 yards, 1 TD
Austin Peay	Receiving	Drae McCray	6 receptions, 87 yards
Ole Miss	Passing	Matt Corral	21/33, 281 yards, 5 TD
Ole Miss	Rushing	Henry Parrish Jr.	8 carries, 72 yards
Ole Miss	Receiving	Dontario Drummond	6 receptions, 107 yards, 2 TD

=== Tulane ===
Uniform Combination
Helmet	Jersey	Pants

Tulane Green Wave (1–1) at No. 17 Ole Miss Rebels (2–0)

Quarter	1	2	3	4	Total
Green Wave	7	14	0	0	21
No. 17 Rebels	19	21	21	0	61

at Vaught–Hemingway Stadium • Oxford, MS

- Date: Saturday, September 18, 2021
- Game time: *8:45 p.m. CST
- Game weather: Rain • Temperature: 75 °F (24 °C)
- Game attendance: 54,198
- Referee: Jason Autrey
- TV announcers (ESPN2):
  Anish Shroff (play-by-play)
  Mike Golic Jr. (color)
  Taylor McGregor (sideline)

Game information

First Quarter

- (11:27) MISS – Henry Parrish Jr. 19 yard rush, Caden Costa kick
  Ole Miss 7–0; 11 plays, 75 yards, 3:33
- (6:41) MISS – Matt Corral 9 yard rush, Caden Costa kick missed
  Ole Miss 13–0; 12 plays, 82 yards, 3:16
- (3:40) TULN – Cameron Carroll 1 yard rush, Merek Glover kick
  Ole Miss 13–7; 5 plays, 33 yards, 1:45
- (0:00) MISS – Matt Corral 15 yard rush, two-point conversion failed
  Ole Miss 19–7; 10 plays, 70 yards, 3:40

Second Quarter

- (9:30) MISS – Dontario Drummond 12 yard pass from Matt Corral, Caden Costa kick
  Ole Miss 26–7; 8 plays, 80 yards, 2:32
- (7:21) TULN – Shae Wyatt 39 yard pass from Michael Pratt, Merek Glover kick
  Ole Miss 26–14; 6 plays, 66 yards, 2:09
- (7:12) MISS – Jonathan Mingo 50 yard pass from Matt Corral, Caden Costa kick
  Ole Miss 33–14; 1 play, 50 yards, 0:09
- (2:26) MISS – Dontario Drummond 11 yard rush, Caden Costa kick
  Ole Miss 40–14; 9 plays, 61 yards, 3:30
- (0:42) TULN – Tyrick James 22 yard pass from Michael Pratt, Merek Glover kick
  Ole Miss 40–21; 6 plays, 74 yards, 1:44

Third Quarter

- (11:35) MISS – Matt Corral 15 yard rush, Caden Costa kick
  Ole Miss 47–21; 5 plays, 51 yards, 1:22
- (10:59) MISS – Matt Corral 12 yard rush, Caden Costa kick
  Ole Miss 54–21; 2 plays, 37 yards, 0:36
- (7:56) MISS – Braylon Sanders 45 yard pass from Matt Corral, Caden Costa kick
  Ole Miss 61–21; 4 plays, 75 yards, 0:51

Fourth Quarter

- No scoring plays

*Originally scheduled to kickoff at 7:00 p.m. CST but was delayed due to inclement weather.

Statistics	TULN	MISS
First downs	14	41
Total yards	305	707
Passing yards	166	335
Rushing yards	139	372
Penalties	11–109	9–65
Turnovers	1	1
Time of possession	27:43	32:17

Team	Category	Player	Statistics
Tulane	Passing	Michael Pratt	10/18, 166 yards, 2 TD
Tulane	Rushing	Devin Brumfield	9 carries, 47 yards
Tulane	Receiving	Duece Watts	2 receptions, 51 yards
Ole Miss	Passing	Matt Corral	23/31, 335 yards, 3 TD
Ole Miss	Rushing	Jerrion Ealy	15 carries, 103 yards
Ole Miss	Receiving	Jonathan Mingo	6 receptions, 136 yards, 1 TD

=== At No. 1 Alabama ===
Uniform Combination
Helmet	Jersey	Pants

No. 12 Ole Miss Rebels (3–0) at No. 1 Alabama Crimson Tide (4–0)

Quarter	1	2	3	4	Total
No. 12 Rebels	0	0	7	14	21
No. 1 Crimson Tide	7	21	7	7	42

at Bryant–Denny Stadium • Tuscaloosa, AL

- Date: Saturday, October 2, 2021
- Game time: 2:30 p.m. CST
- Game weather: Cloudy • Temperature: 82 °F (28 °C)
- Game attendance: 100,077
- Referee: Ken Williamson
- TV announcers (CBS):
  Brad Nessler (play-by-play)
  Gary Danielson (color)
  Jamie Erdahl (sideline)

Game information

First Quarter

- (2:20) ALA – John Metchie III 16 yard pass from Bryce Young, Will Reichard kick
  Alabama 7–0; 13 plays, 94 yards, 6:31

Second Quarter

- (12:14) ALA – Brian Robinson Jr. 1 yard rush, Will Reichard kick
  Alabama 14–0; 10 plays, 47 yards, 3:28
- (2:55) ALA – Cameron Latu 3 yard pass from Bryce Young, Will Reichard kick
  Alabama 21–0; 6 plays, 27 yards, 3:04
- (0:57) ALA – Brian Robinson Jr. 1 yard rush, Will Reichard kick
  Alabama 28–0; 4 plays, 14 yards, 1:42

Third Quarter

- (12:32) ALA – Brian Robinson Jr. 1 yard rush, Will Reichard kick
  Alabama 35–0; 6 plays, 77 yards, 2:28
- (8:25) MISS – Matt Corral 10 yard rush, Caden Costa kick
  Alabama 35–7; 10 plays, 75 yards, 4:07

Fourth Quarter

- (10:47) ALA – Brian Robinson Jr. 2 yard rush, Will Reichard kick
  Alabama 42–7; 9 plays, 66 yards, 4:49
- (8:43) MISS – Snoop Conner 1 yard rush, Caden Costa kick
  Alabama 42–14; 7 plays, 70 yards, 2:04
- (2:23) MISS – Chase Rogers 2 yard pass from Matt Corral, Caden Costa kick
  Alabama 42–21; 9 plays, 50 yards, 1:54

Statistics	MISS	ALA
First downs	18	27
Total yards	291	451
Passing yards	213	241
Rushing yards	78	210
Penalties	7–55	5–52
Turnovers	1	1
Time of possession	22:01	37:59

Team	Category	Player	Statistics
Ole Miss	Passing	Matt Corral	21/29, 213 yards, 1 TD
Ole Miss	Rushing	Henry Parrish Jr.	11 carries, 47 yards
Ole Miss	Receiving	Chase Rogers	3 receptions, 53 yards, 1 TD
Alabama	Passing	Bryce Young	20/26, 241 yards, 2 TD, 1 INT
Alabama	Rushing	Brian Robinson Jr.	36 carries, 171 yards, 4 TD
Alabama	Receiving	Jameson Williams	5 receptions, 65 yards

=== No. 13 Arkansas ===
Uniform Combination
Helmet	Jersey	Pants

No. 13 Arkansas Razorbacks (4–1) at No. 17 Ole Miss Rebels (3–1)

Quarter	1	2	3	4	Total
No. 13 Razorbacks	7	7	17	20	51
No. 17 Rebels	0	21	10	21	52

at Vaught–Hemingway Stadium • Oxford, MS

- Date: Saturday, October 9, 2021
- Game time: 11:00 a.m. CST
- Game weather: Sunny • Temperature: 83 °F (28 °C)
- Game attendance: 60,256
- Referee: Alex Moore
- TV announcers (ESPN):
  Joe Tessitore (play-by-play)
  Greg McElroy (color)
  Katie George (sideline)

Game information

First Quarter

- (4:17) ARK – KJ Jefferson 5 yard rush, Cam Little kick
  Arkansas 7–0; 15 plays, 82 yards, 6:55

Second Quarter

- (13:35) MISS – Matt Corral 5 yard rush, Caden Costa kick missed
  Arkansas 7–6; 17 plays, 75 yards, 5:42
- (10:32) ARK – Trelon Smith 14 yard rush, Cam Little kick
  Arkansas 14–6; 9 plays, 75 yards, 3:03
- (9:53) MISS – Dontario Drummond 67 yard pass from Matt Corral, Two-point conversion
  Tied 14–14; 2 plays, 83 yards, 0:39
- (0:42) MISS – Matt Corral 7 yard rush, Caden Costa kick
  Ole Miss 21–14; 9 plays, 68 yards, 2:39

Third Quarter

- (11:38) MISS – Caden Costa 50 yard field goal
  Ole Miss 24–14; 8 plays, 42 yards, 3:22
- (7:30) ARK – Trey Knox 3 yard pass from KJ Jefferson, Cam Little kick
  Ole Miss 24–21; 9 plays, 75 yards, 4:08
- (4:24) ARK – Cam Little 31 yard field goal
  Tied 24–24; 5 plays, 20 yards, 1:53
- (3:34) MISS – Snoop Conner 51 yard rush, Caden Costa kick
  Ole Miss 31–24; 3 plays, 79 yards, 0:50
- (1:42) ARK – KJ Jefferson, Cam Little kick
  Tied 31–31; 4 plays, 75 yards, 1:52

Fourth Quarter

- (13:13) MISS – Snoop Conner 34 yard rush, Caden Costa kick
  Ole Miss 38–31; 10 plays, 75 yards, 3:29
- (11:12) ARK – Treylon Burks 20 yard pass from KJ Jefferson, Cam Little kick
  Tied 38–38; 4 plays, 86 yards, 2:01
- (9:01) MISS – Snoop Conner 1 yard rush, Caden Costa kick
  Ole Miss 45–38; 7 plays, 75 yards, 2:11
- (1:22) ARK – KJ Jefferson 10 yard rush, Cam Little kick
  Tied 45–45; 8 plays, 65 yards, 2:37
- (1:07) MISS – Braylon Sanders 68 yard pass from Matt Corral, Caden Costa kick
  Ole Miss 52–45; 2 plays, 75 yards, 0:15
- (0:00) ARK – Warren Thompson 9 yard pass from KJ Jefferson, Two-point conversion failed
  Ole Miss 52–51; 9 plays, 75 yards, 1:07

Statistics	ARK	MISS
First downs	39	22
Total yards	676	611
Passing yards	326	287
Rushing yards	350	324
Penalties	4–25	8–75
Turnovers	2	0
Time of possession	35:35	24:25

Team	Category	Player	Statistics
Arkansas	Passing	KJ Jefferson	25/35, 326 yards, 3 TD, 1 INT
Arkansas	Rushing	Raheim Sanders	17 carries, 139 yards
Arkansas	Receiving	Treylon Burks	7 receptions, 136 yards, 1 TD
Ole Miss	Passing	Matt Corral	14/21, 287 yards, 2 TD
Ole Miss	Rushing	Henry Parrish Jr.	18 carries, 111 yards
Ole Miss	Receiving	Braylon Sanders	2 receptions, 127 yards, 1 TD

=== At Tennessee ===
Uniform Combination
Helmet	Jersey	Pants

No. 13 Ole Miss Rebels (4–1) at Tennessee Volunteers (4–2)

Quarter	1	2	3	4	Total
No. 13 Rebels	10	14	7	0	31
Volunteers	9	3	7	7	26

at Neyland Stadium • Knoxville, TN

- Date: Saturday, October 16, 2021
- Game time: 6:30 p.m. CST (7:30 p.m. local EST)
- Game weather: Sunny • Temperature: 59 °F (15 °C)
- Game attendance: 102,455
- Referee: Marc Curles
- TV announcers (SECN):
  Tom Hart (play-by-play)
  Jordan Rodgers (color)
  Cole Cubelic (sideline)

Game information

First Quarter

- (9:50) MISS – Snoop Conner 1 yard rush, Caden Costa kick
  Ole Miss 7–0; 4 plays, 11 yards, 0:58
- (4:35) TENN – Matt Corral intentional grounding in end zone
  Ole Miss 7–2
- (3:51) TENN – Cedric Tillman 16 yard pass from Hendon Hooker, Chase McGrath kick
  Tennessee 9–7; 3 plays, 49 yards, 0:37
- (0:44) MISS – Caden Costa 30 yard field goal
  Ole Miss 10–9; 11 plays, 57 yards, 3:01

Second Quarter

- (11:27) MISS – Dannis Jackson 33 yard pass from Matt Corral, Caden Costa kick
  Ole Miss 17–9; 8 plays, 54 yards, 2:30
- (5:30) MISS – Snoop Conner 1 yard rush, Caden Costa kick
  Ole Miss 24–9; 12 plays, 91 yards, 3:37
- (0:00) TENN – Chase McGrath 39 yard field goal
  Ole Miss 24–12; 6 plays, 62 yards, 0:53

Third Quarter

- (12:38) TENN – Jabari Small 1 yard rush, Chase McGrath kick
  Ole Miss 24–19; 8 plays, 77 yards, 2:18
- (2:04) MISS – Dontario Drummond 16 yard pass from Matt Corral, Caden Costa kick
  Ole Miss 31–19; 8 plays, 68 yards, 3:02

Fourth Quarter

- (13:41) TENN – Hendon Hooker 5 yard rush, Chase McGrath kick
  Ole Miss 31–26; 9 plays, 88 yards, 3:14

Statistics	MISS	TENN
First downs	29	29
Total yards	510	467
Passing yards	231	245
Rushing yards	279	222
Penalties	10–75	6–48
Turnovers	1	1
Time of possession	34:09	25:51

Team	Category	Player	Statistics
Ole Miss	Passing	Matt Corral	21/38, 231 yards, 2 TD, 1 INT
Ole Miss	Rushing	Matt Corral	30 carries, 195 yards
Ole Miss	Receiving	Dontario Drummond	2 receptions, 66 yards, 1 TD
Tennessee	Passing	Hendon Hooker	17/26, 233 yards, 1 TD
Tennessee	Rushing	Hendon Hooker	23 carries, 108 yards, 1 TD
Tennessee	Receiving	Velus Jones Jr.	6 receptions, 93 yards

=== LSU ===
Uniform Combination
Helmet	Jersey	Pants

LSU Tigers (4–3) at No. 12 Ole Miss Rebels (5–1)

Quarter	1	2	3	4	Total
Tigers	7	0	0	10	17
No. 12 Rebels	0	17	14	0	31

at Vaught–Hemingway Stadium • Oxford, MS

- Date: Saturday, October 23, 2021
- Game time: 2:30 p.m. CST
- Game weather: Sunny • Temperature: 76 °F (24 °C)
- Game attendance: 64,523
- Referee: Jason Autrey
- TV announcers (CBS):
  Brad Nessler (play-by-play)
  Gary Danielson (color)
  Jamie Erdahl (sideline)

Game information

First Quarter

- (8:29) LSU – Tyrion Davis-Price 1 yard rush, Cade York kick
  LSU 7–0; 9 plays, 90 yards, 4:33

Second Quarter

- (10:44) MISS – Caden Costa 43 yard field goal
  LSU 7–3; 13 plays, 74 yards, 5:07
- (3:12) MISS – Casey Kelly 2 yard pass from Matt Corral, Caden Costa kick
  Ole Miss 10–7; 7 plays, 63 yards, 3:11
- (0:15) MISS – Matt Corral 3 yard rush, Caden Costa kick
  Ole Miss 17–7; 9 plays, 80 yards, 2:05

Third Quarter

- (8:59) MISS – Henry Parrish Jr. 5 yard rush, Caden Costa kick
  Ole Miss 24–7; 10 plays, 66 yards, 4:11
- (2:27) MISS – Jerrion Ealy 36 yard rush, Caden Costa kick
  Ole Miss 31–7; 6 plays, 62 yards, 2:41

Fourth Quarter

- (7:28) LSU – Cade York 47 yard field goal
  Ole Miss 31–10; 14 plays, 51 yards, 4:37
- (3:55) LSU – Malik Nabers 9 yard pass from Garrett Nussmeier, Cade York kick
  Ole Miss 31–17; 6 plays, 80 yards, 2:00

Statistics	LSU	MISS
First downs	20	25
Total yards	326	470
Passing yards	249	204
Rushing yards	77	266
Penalties	2–16	12–106
Turnovers	3	1
Time of possession	29:08	30:52

Team	Category	Player	Statistics
LSU	Passing	Max Johnson	13/21, 146 yards, 1 INT
LSU	Rushing	Tyrion Davis-Price	17 carries, 53 yards, 1 TD
LSU	Receiving	Jaray Jenkins	4 receptions, 52 yards
Ole Miss	Passing	Matt Corral	18/23, 185 yards, 1 TD
Ole Miss	Rushing	Snoop Conner	14 carries, 117 yards
Ole Miss	Receiving	Dontario Drummond	8 receptions, 93 yards

=== At No. 18 Auburn ===
Uniform Combination
Helmet	Jersey	Pants

No. 10 Ole Miss Rebels (6–1) at No. 18 Auburn Tigers (5–2)

Quarter	1	2	3	4	Total
No. 10 Rebels	3	14	3	0	20
No. 18 Tigers	14	14	0	3	31

at Jordan–Hare Stadium • Auburn, AL

- Date: Saturday, October 30, 2021
- Game time: 6:00 p.m. CST
- Game weather: Cloudy • Temperature: 55 °F (13 °C)
- Game attendance: 87,451
- Referee: Ken Williamson
- TV announcers (ESPN):
  Sean McDonough (play-by-play)
  Todd Blackledge (color)
  Molly McGrath (sideline)

Game information

First Quarter

- (10:11) AUB – Bo Nix 11 yard rush, Anders Carlson kick
  Auburn 7–0; 11 plays, 82 yards, 4:49
- (6:31) MISS – Caden Costa 29 yard field goal
  Auburn 7–3; 12 plays, 61 yards, 3:40
- (1:49) AUB – Tank Bigsby 1 yard rush, Anders Carlson kick
  Auburn 14–3; 10 plays, 72 yards, 4:42

Second Quarter

- (8:19) MISS – Snoop Conner 13 yard rush, Caden Costa kick
  Auburn 14–10; 15 plays, 88 yards, 5:25
- (6:20) AUB – Bo Nix 7 yard rush, Anders Carlson kick
  Auburn 21–10; 5 plays, 77 yards, 1:59
- (2:42) MISS – Matt Corral 11 yard rush, Caden Costa kick
  Auburn 21–17; 10 plays, 75 yards, 3:38
- (0:11) AUB – Jarquez Hunter 9 yard pass from Bo Nix, Anders Carlson kick
  Auburn 28–17; 11 plays, 69 yards, 2:31

Third Quarter

- (6:31) MISS – Caden Costa 49 yard field goal
  Auburn 28–20; 7 plays, 42 yards, 1:28

Fourth Quarter

- (10:52) AUB – Anders Carlson 28 yard field goal
  Auburn 31–20; 11 plays, 76 yards, 5:16

Statistics	MISS	AUB
First downs	26	30
Total yards	464	483
Passing yards	307	276
Rushing yards	157	207
Penalties	7–57	6–40
Turnovers	1	2
Time of possession	26:35	33:25

Team	Category	Player	Statistics
Ole Miss	Passing	Matt Corral	21/37, 289 yards, 1 INT
Ole Miss	Rushing	Henry Parrish Jr.	12 carries, 57 yards
Ole Miss	Receiving	Jahcour Pearson	7 receptions, 135 yards
Auburn	Passing	Bo Nix	22/30, 276 yards, 1 TD
Auburn	Rushing	Tank Bigsby	23 carries, 140 yards, 1 TD
Auburn	Receiving	Kobe Hudson	6 receptions, 79 yards

=== Liberty ===
Uniform Combination
Helmet	Jersey	Pants

Liberty Flames (7–2) at No. 16 Ole Miss Rebels (6–2)

Quarter	1	2	3	4	Total
Flames	0	0	14	0	14
No. 16 Rebels	10	14	3	0	27

at Vaught–Hemingway Stadium • Oxford, MS

- Date: Saturday, November 6, 2021
- Game time: 11:00 a.m. CST
- Game weather: Sunny • Temperature: 52 °F (11 °C)
- Game attendance: 53,235
- Referee: Marc Curles
- TV announcers (SECN):
  Dave Neal (play-by-play)
  Deuce McAllister (color)
  Andraya Carter (sideline)

Game information

First Quarter

- (14:26) MISS – Jerrion Ealy 70 yard rush, Caden Costa kick
  Ole Miss 7–0; 2 plays, 75 yards, 0:34
- (1:22) MISS – Caden Costa 43 yard field goal
  Ole Miss 10–0; 5 plays, 54 yards, 1:18

Second Quarter

- (13:13) MISS – Jerrion Ealy 4 yard rush, Caden Costa kick
  Ole Miss 17–0; 4 plays, 58 yards, 0:56
- (1:27) MISS – Dannis Jackson 40 yard pass from Matt Corral, Caden Costa kick
  Ole Miss 24–0; 5 plays, 70 yards, 1:28

Third Quarter

- (10:31) LIB – Shedro Louis 28 yard rush, Brayden Beck kick
  Ole Miss 24–7; 8 plays, 75 yards, 4:29
- (6:49) MISS – Caden Costa 38 yard field goal
  Ole Miss 27–7; 9 plays, 54 yards, 3:42
- (1:08) LIB – Malik Willis 3 yard rush, Brayden Beck kick
  Ole Miss 27–14; 11 plays, 73 yards, 5:41

Fourth Quarter

- No scoring plays

Statistics	LIB	MISS
First downs	30	20
Total yards	457	466
Passing yards	173	324
Rushing yards	284	142
Penalties	6–59	9–79
Turnovers	3	0
Time of possession	39:35	20:25

Team	Category	Player	Statistics
Liberty	Passing	Malik Willis	16/25, 173 yards, 3 INT
Liberty	Rushing	Shedro Louis	7 carries, 101 yards, 1 TD
Liberty	Receiving	Demario Douglas	5 receptions, 56 yards
Ole Miss	Passing	Matt Corral	20/27, 324 yards, 1 TD
Ole Miss	Rushing	Jerrion Ealy	10 carries, 115 yards, 2 TD
Ole Miss	Receiving	Dannis Jackson	6 receptions, 126 yards, 1 TD

=== No. 11 Texas A&M ===
Uniform Combination
Helmet	Jersey	Pants

No. 11 Texas A&M Aggies (7–2) at No. 15 Ole Miss Rebels (7–2)

Quarter	1	2	3	4	Total
No. 11 Aggies	0	0	10	9	19
No. 15 Rebels	10	5	0	14	29

at Vaught–Hemingway Stadium • Oxford, MS

- Date: Saturday, November 13, 2021
- Game time: 6:00 p.m. CST
- Game weather: Sunny • Temperature: 46 °F (8 °C)
- Game attendance: 64,425
- Referee: David Smith
- TV announcers (ESPN):
  Chris Fowler (play-by-play)
  Kirk Herbstreit (color)
  Holly Rowe (sideline)

Game information

First Quarter

- (12:56) MISS – Caden Costa 33 yard field goal
  Ole Miss 3–0; 9 plays, 58 yards, 2:04
- (6:48) MISS – Dontario Drummond 2 yard pass from Matt Corral, Caden Costa kick
  Ole Miss 10–0; 14 plays, 94 yards, 4:12

Second Quarter

- (9:34) MISS – Caden Costa 32 yard field goal
  Ole Miss 13–0; 9 plays, 75 yards, 2:55
- (4:00) MISS – Isaiah Spiller tackled in end zone for a safety
  Ole Miss 15–0

Third Quarter

- (10:03) TA&M – Seth Small 30 yard field goal
  Ole Miss 15–3; 12 plays, 62 yards, 4:57
- (6:24) TA&M – De’Von Achane 24 yard rush, Seth Small kick
  Ole Miss 15–10; 7 plays, 88 yards, 3:06

Fourth Quarter

- (10:19) TA&M – Seth Small 43 yard field goal
  Ole Miss 15–13; 9 plays, 55 yards, 3:19
- (6:32) MISS – Snoop Conner 13 yard rush, Caden Costa kick
  Ole Miss 22–13; 2 plays, 14 yards, 0:25
- (4:50) MISS – Zach Calzada pass intercepted and returned 52 yards by A.J. Finley, Caden Costa kick
  Ole Miss 29–13
- (3:11) TA&M – De’Von Achane 9 yard rush, Two-point conversion failed
  Ole Miss 29–19; 6 plays, 69 yards, 1:39

Statistics	TA&M	MISS
First downs	20	32
Total yards	378	504
Passing yards	237	247
Rushing yards	141	257
Penalties	10–85	6–51
Turnovers	2	1
Time of possession	30:03	29:57

Team	Category	Player	Statistics
Texas A&M	Passing	Zach Calzada	24/42, 237 yards, 2 INT
Texas A&M	Rushing	De’Von Achane	12 carries, 110 yards, 2 TD
Texas A&M	Receiving	Ainias Smith	5 receptions, 77 yards
Ole Miss	Passing	Matt Corral	24/37, 247 yards, 1 TD
Ole Miss	Rushing	Jerrion Ealy	24 carries, 152 yards
Ole Miss	Receiving	Jahcour Pearson	5 receptions, 69 yards

=== Vanderbilt ===
Uniform Combination
Helmet	Jersey	Pants

Vanderbilt Commodores (2–8) at No. 12 Ole Miss Rebels (8–2)

Quarter	1	2	3	4	Total
Commodores	3	6	0	8	17
No. 12 Rebels	10	14	0	7	31

at Vaught–Hemingway Stadium • Oxford, MS

- Date: Saturday, November 20, 2021
- Game time: 6:30 p.m. CST
- Game weather: Sunny • Temperature: 55 °F (13 °C)
- Game attendance: 50,819
- Referee: Marc Curles
- TV announcers (SECN):
  Tom Hart (play-by-play)
  Jordan Rodgers (color)
  Cole Cubelic (sideline)

Game information

First Quarter

- (13:53) MISS – Jerrion Ealy 8 yard pass from Matt Corral, Caden Costa kick
  Ole Miss 7–0; 5 plays, 65 yards, 1:07
- (10:18) MISS – Caden Costa 28 yard field goal
  Ole Miss 10–0; 8 plays, 57 yards, 1:44
- (1:08) VAN – Joseph Bulovas 49 yard field goal
  Ole Miss 10–3; 11 plays, 46 yards, 5:51

Second Quarter

- (12:51) MISS – Dontario Drummond 10 yard pass from Matt Corral, Caden Costa kick
  Ole Miss 17–3; 10 plays, 80 yards, 3:17
- (7:22) VAN – Joseph Bulovas 33 yard field goal
  Ole Miss 17–6; 12 plays, 60 yards, 5:29
- (2:15) MISS – Jerrion Ealy 4 yard rush, Caden Costa kick
  Ole Miss 24–6; 3 plays, 18 yards, 0:41
- (0:00) VAN – Joseph Bulovas 41 yard field goal
  Ole Miss 24–9; 11 plays, 52 yards, 2:15

Third Quarter

- No scoring plays

Fourth Quarter

- (12:50) MISS – Henry Parrish Jr. 8 yard rush, Caden Costa kick
  Ole Miss 31–9; 6 plays, 64 yards, 1:57
- (7:47) VAN – Rocko Griffin 1 yard rush, Two-point conversion
  Ole Miss 31–17; 10 plays, 75 yards, 5:03

Statistics	VAN	MISS
First downs	25	23
Total yards	454	470
Passing yards	241	326
Rushing yards	213	144
Penalties	7–39	5–38
Turnovers	1	1
Time of possession	38:57	21:03

Team	Category	Player	Statistics
Vanderbilt	Passing	Mike Wright	22/44, 242 yards, 1 INT
Vanderbilt	Rushing	Rocko Griffin	26 carries, 117 yards, 1 TD
Vanderbilt	Receiving	Chris Pierce Jr.	10 receptions, 113 yards
Ole Miss	Passing	Matt Corral	27/36, 326 yards, 2 TD, 1 INT
Ole Miss	Rushing	Jerrion Ealy	9 carries, 55 yards, 1 TD
Ole Miss	Receiving	Jahcour Pearson	4 receptions, 101 yards

=== At Mississippi State ===
Uniform Combination
Helmet	Jersey	Pants

No. 9 Ole Miss Rebels (9–2) at Mississippi State Bulldogs (7–4)

Quarter	1	2	3	4	Total
No. 9 Rebels	3	7	7	14	31
Bulldogs	6	0	0	15	21

at Davis Wade Stadium • Starkville, MS

- Date: Thursday, November 25, 2021
- Game time: 6:30 p.m. CST
- Game weather: Rain • Temperature: 55 °F (13 °C)
- Game attendance: 55,601
- Referee: Ken Williamson
- TV announcers (ESPN):
  Joe Tessitore (play-by-play)
  Greg McElroy (color)
  Katie George (sideline)

Game information

First Quarter

- (11:46) MSST – Nolan McCord 34 yard field goal
  Mississippi State 3–0; 6 plays, 17 yards, 2:15
- (7:07) MISS – Cale Nation 25 yard field goal
  Tied 3–3; 10 plays, 59 yards, 4:39
- (0:55) MSST – Nolan McCord 29 yard field goal
  Mississippi State 6–3; 13 plays, 54 yards, 6:12

Second Quarter

- (2:21) MISS – Snoop Conner 1 yard rush, Cale Nation kick
  Ole Miss 10–6; 16 plays, 78 yards, 5:25

Third Quarter

- (10:24) MISS – Snoop Conner 1 yard rush, Cale Nation kick
  Ole Miss 17–6; 7 plays, 82 yards, 2:35

Fourth Quarter

- (11:17) MISS – Matt Corral 4 yard rush, Cale Nation kick
  Ole Miss 24–6; 14 plays, 61 yards, 5:59
- (7:20) MSST – Jaden Walley 11 yard pass from Will Rogers, Nolan McCord kick
  Ole Miss 24–13; 2 plays, 22 yards, 0:34
- (5:35) MISS – Jerrion Ealy 15 yard pass from Matt Corral, Cale Nation kick
  Ole Miss 31–13; 6 plays, 42 yards, 1:45
- (2:27) MSST – Jo'quavious Marks 11 yard rush, Two point conversion
  Ole Miss 31–21; 10 plays, 66 yards, 3:08

Statistics	MISS	MSST
First downs	23	30
Total yards	388	420
Passing yards	234	336
Rushing yards	154	84
Penalties	11–73	8–75
Turnovers	1	0
Time of possession	30:16	29:44

Team	Category	Player	Statistics
Ole Miss	Passing	Matt Corral	26/34, 234 yards, 1 TD, 1 INT
Ole Miss	Rushing	Jerrion Ealy	16 carries, 60 yards
Ole Miss	Receiving	Dontario Drummond	14 receptions, 138 yards
Mississippi State	Passing	Will Rogers	38/58, 336 yards, 1 TD
Mississippi State	Rushing	Jo'Quavious Marks	8 carries, 45 yards, 1 TD
Mississippi State	Receiving	Makai Polk	10 receptions, 98 yards

=== Vs. No. 7 Baylor (Sugar Bowl) ===
Uniform Combination
Helmet	Jersey	Pants

No. 7 Baylor Bears (11–2) vs. No. 8 Ole Miss Rebels (10–2)

Quarter	1	2	3	4	Total
No. 7 Bears	0	7	0	14	21
No. 8 Rebels	0	0	7	0	7

at Caesars Superdome • New Orleans, LA

- Date: Saturday, January 1, 2022
- Game time: 7:45 p.m. CST
- Game weather: None (indoor stadium)
- Game attendance: 66,479
- Referee: Ron Snodgrass
- TV announcers (ESPN):
  Joe Tessitore (play-by-play)
  Greg McElroy (color)
  Katie George (sideline)

Game information

First Quarter

- No scoring plays

Second Quarter

- (10:16) BAYL – Luke Altmyer pass intercepted and returned 96 yards by Al Walcott, Isaiah Hankins kick
  Baylor 7–0

Third Quarter

- (9:13) MISS – Braylon Sanders 37 yard pass from Luke Altmyer, Cale Nation kick
  Tied 7–7; 6 plays, 72 yards, 1:48

Fourth Quarter

- (11:14) BAYL – Monaray Baldwin 48 yard rush, Isaiah Hankins kick
  Baylor 14–7; 5 plays, 80 yards, 1:55
- (7:24) BAYL – Tyquan Thornton 2 yard pass from Gerry Bohanon, Isaiah Hankins kick
  Baylor 21–7; 5 plays, 15 yards, 2:34

Statistics	BAYL	MISS
First downs	12	20
Total yards	319	322
Passing yards	40	184
Rushing yards	279	138
Penalties	5-55	7-49
Turnovers	1	3
Time of possession	28:24	31:36

Team	Category	Player	Statistics
Baylor	Passing	Gerry Bohanon	7/17, 40 yards, 1 TD, 1 INT
Baylor	Rushing	Abram Smith	25 carries, 172 yards
Baylor	Receiving	Drew Estrada	2 receptions, 14 yards
Ole Miss	Passing	Luke Altmyer	15/28, 174 yards, 1 TD, 2 INT
Ole Miss	Rushing	Jerrion Ealy	12 carries, 65 yards
Ole Miss	Receiving	Dontario Drummond	9 receptions, 104 yards

== Cumulative Season Statistics ==
=== Cumulative Team Statistics ===
Category	Ole Miss	Opponents
First downs - Avg. per game	338 - 26	324 - 24.92
Points - Avg. per game	438 - 33.69	321 - 24.69
Total plays/yards - Avg. per game	1017/6402 (6.29 yards/play) - 78.23/492.46	992/5465 (5.51 yards/play) - 76.31/420.38
Passing yards - Avg. per game	3573 - 274.85	2990 - 230
Rushes/yards (net) - Avg. per game	588/2829 - 45.23/217.61 (4.81 yards/carry)	549/2475 - 42.23/190.38 (4.51 yards/carry)
Passing (Att-Comp-Int)	429-286-7 (66.67% completion)	443-270-11 (60.95% completion)
Sacks - Avg. per game	39 - 3	34 - 2.62
Penalties–yards - Avg. per game	117–978 - 9–75.23	82–692 - 6.31–53.23
3rd down conversions	73–191 (38.22%)	72–186 (38.71%)
4th down conversions	31–49 (63.27%)	17–35 (48.57%)
Time of possession - Avg. per game	5:55:00 - 27:18	7:02:37 - 32:31

=== Cumulative Player Statistics ===
Category	Player	Statistics - Avg. per game
Leading Passer	Matt Corral	262/386 (67.88% completion), 3349 yards, 20 TD, 5 INT - 20.15/29.69, 257.62 yards, 1.54 TD, 0.38 INT
Leading Rusher	Jerrion Ealy	133 carries, 768 yards, 5 TD - 10.23 carries, 59.08 yards (5.77 yards/carry), 0.38 TD
Leading Receiver	Dontario Drummond	76 receptions, 1028 yards, 8 TD - 5.85 receptions, 79.08 yards, 0.62 TD

== Coaching staff ==
Coach	Title	Year at Ole Miss	Previous job
Lane Kiffin	Head Coach	2nd	Florida Atlantic
Jeff Lebby	OC/QB	2nd	UCF (OC/QB)
D. J. Durkin	Co-DC/LB	2nd	Atlanta Falcons (consultant)
Chris Partridge	Co-DC/S	2nd	Michigan (S/STC)
Randall Joyner	DL	1st	SMU (DL)
Terrell Buckley	CB	2nd	Mississippi State (CB)
Jake Thornton	OL	1st	Gardner–Webb (OL)
John David Baker	TE/PGC	1st	USC (TE)
Coleman Hutzler	STC	1st	Texas (Co-DC/LB)
Derrick Nix	WR	14th	Atlanta Falcons (OA)
Kevin Smith	RB	2nd	Florida Atlantic (RB)
