= Jeff Grimes =

American football player and coach (born 1968)

Current position
- Title: Offensive coordinator
- Team: Wisconsin
- Conference: Big Ten

Biographical details
- Born: September 23, 1968 (age 58); Garland, Texas, U.S.

Playing career
- 1987–1990: UTEP
- Position: Offensive tackle

Coaching career (HC unless noted)
- 1995: Rice (GA)
- 1996–1997: Texas A&M (GA)
- 1998–1999: Hardin–Simmons (OL)
- 2000: Boise State (OL)
- 2001–2003: Arizona State (OL/RGC)
- 2004–2006: BYU (OL)
- 2007–2008: Colorado (AHC/OL/RGC)
- 2009–2012: Auburn (OL)
- 2013: Virginia Tech (OL)
- 2014–2017: LSU (OL/RGC)
- 2018–2020: BYU (OC)
- 2021–2023: Baylor (OC/TE)
- 2024: Kansas (AHC/OC)
- 2025–present: Wisconsin (OC)

Jeff Grimes (born September 23, 1968) is an American college football coach. He is the offensive coordinator for the University of Wisconsin–Madison, a position he has held since 2025. He was previously the offensive coordinator at the University of Kansas (2024), Baylor University (2021 to 2023), and Brigham Young University (BYU) (2017 to 2020). He also served as Louisiana State University's (LSU) offensive line coach and run game coordinator (2014 to 2017), and the offensive line coach at both Virginia Tech (2013) and Auburn University (2009 to 2012). In addition, he was the assistant head coach, run game coordinator and offensive line coach at the University of Colorado (2007 to 2008), BYU's offensive line coach (2004 to 2006), offensive line coach and run game coordinator at Arizona State University (ASU) (2001 to 2003), and offensive line coach at Boise State University (BSU) (2000).

== Playing career ==
Grimes earned four letters as an offensive tackle for the University of Texas-El Paso (UTEP) Miners from 1987 to 1990. He was coached by Marty Mornhinweg (QB coach), Dave Toub (strength coach), Andy Reid (offensive line coach), and Dirk Koetter (offensive coordinator). Grimes was not drafted into the National Football League (NFL), but had a brief professional career, participating in training camp with both the Los Angeles Raiders and the World League of American Football's San Antonio Riders.

== Coaching career ==
=== Early career ===
Grimes began coaching in 1993 as a high school coach at Riverside High School in El Paso, Texas. After two years as the offensive coordinator and line coach there, he moved to the college ranks and started working as a graduate assistant under Ken Hatfield at Rice in 1995. He spent the next two seasons in the same position under R. C. Slocum at Texas A&M, while serving under line coach Mike Sherman, before receiving his first full-time college position in 1998 as offensive line coach at Hardin–Simmons, under Jimmie Keeling. The Cowboys were 21-2 during his tenure, averaged 39.4 points per game and reached the national semifinals in 1999.

=== Boise State ===
In 2000, Grimes was hired as the offensive line coach at BSU under his former college football coach, Koetter. Grimes worked alongside Dan Hawkins. In the season at BSU, the offensive line he coached helped the Broncos lead the nation in scoring offense and accumulate 175 rushing yards per game.

=== Arizona State ===
In 2001, when Koetter was hired as the head coach at ASU, Grimes followed him to serve as the offensive line coach and run game coordinator. Grimes had great success at ASU, with four of the 2001 seniors drafted into the NFL (just the second time that had been done at any school since the NFL adopted the seven-round draft format in 1993). He helped orchestrate a solid rushing attack, tutoring Loren Wade to break the ASU freshman rushing record while leading the Pac-10 in yards per carry.

=== BYU ===
In 2004, Grimes was hired as the offensive line coach at BYU, under head coach Gary Crowton. After Crowton resigned following the 2004 season, newly promoted head coach Bronco Mendenhall decided to keep Grimes on his staff. The 2006 BYU linemen Grimes coached blocked for the nation's fourth best offense, averaging over 465 yards per game including 141.9 on the ground, and were a large part of the Cougars winning the Mountain West Conference championship. BYU finished 11–2 and ranked 15th in the Coaches' Poll.

=== Colorado ===
In February 2007, Grimes was hired as the assistant head coach, offensive line coach and run game coordinator at the University of Colorado, under head coach Hawkins. Grimes and Hawkins had previously worked together at BSU and Grimes also served with Colorado offensive coordinator Mark Helfrich at ASU.

=== Auburn ===
In January 2009, Grimes was hired by new head coach Gene Chizik to coach the offensive line at Auburn.

After the 2010 season, Grimes was interviewed by Mack Brown to become the new offensive line coach at the University of Texas, where it was reported he would have become the highest paid coach at his position in the country. Ultimately, Grimes decided to stay at Auburn.

At the end of the 2012 season, Chizik was fired by Auburn, with former offensive coordinator, Gus Malzahn, hired as head coach on December 4, 2012. Shortly after being hired, Malzahn announced that all assistant coaches were being released, thus ending Grimes' career at Auburn.

=== Virginia Tech ===
On January 18, 2013, Grimes was hired as the offensive line coach at Virginia Tech under head coach Frank Beamer. Grimes was hired alongside offensive coordinator and quarterbacks coach Scot Loeffler (also formerly of Auburn) and wide receivers coach Aaron Moorehead (formerly of Stanford University).

=== LSU ===
In 2014, following Virginia Tech's 2013 bowl game, Grimes was named the offensive line coach at LSU, under head coach Les Miles, replacing Greg Studrawa. The news was unofficially released on January 15, 2014, and later confirmed by Virginia Tech's running backs coach, Shane Beamer.

=== BYU (second stint) ===
In December 2017, Grimes was named the offensive coordinator at BYU, under head coach Kalani Sitake, replacing Ty Detmer. During his tenure at BYU, Grimes developed BYU quarterback Zach Wilson, who threw for a career-high 3,692 passing yards, 33 touchdowns and 3 interceptions with a passer rating of 196.4 in 2020. That season, Grimes' offense ranked 3rd nationally in scoring offense (43.5 PPG) and was the leader in yards per play (7.84). In 2020, Grimes was a finalist for the Broyles Award, given annually to the best assistant coach in college football.

=== Baylor ===
On January 4, 2021, Grimes was named the offensive coordinator at Baylor under head coach Dave Aranda, replacing Larry Fedora. In his first season with Baylor, Grimes was again a finalist for the Broyles Award, as Baylor posted a 12–2 record and won the Big 12 conference title. Afterwards the team regressed, and Grimes was dismissed following the 2023 season amidst other changes to the program.

=== Kansas ===
Kansas hired Grimes in December 2023 as offensive coordinator and assistant head coach under Lance Leipold. He replaced Andy Kotelnicki, who departed after the season to take the same job at Penn State.

=== Wisconsin ===
In December 2024, Grimes was announced as the offensive coordinator at Wisconsin under head coach Luke Fickell.

== Personal life ==
Grimes graduated from UTEP in 1991 with a bachelor's degree in education, and earned a master's degree in education administration from Texas A&M in 1997, while serving as a graduate assistant. Grimes is married to Sheri Hermesmeyer-Grimes, a former Aggies volleyball player, and they are the parents of four children. His son Garrison is a long snapper who played for Baylor and BYU.
