= 2021 Baylor Bears football team =

American college football season

2021 Baylor Bears football

Big 12 champion Sugar Bowl champion

Big 12 Championship Game, W 21–16 vs. Oklahoma State

Sugar Bowl, W 21–7 vs. Ole Miss
- Conference: Big 12 Conference

Ranking
- Coaches: No. 6
- AP: No. 5
- Record: 12–2 (7–2 Big 12)
- Head coach: Dave Aranda (2nd season)
- Offensive coordinator: Jeff Grimes (1st season)
- Offensive scheme: Multiple
- Defensive coordinator: Ron Roberts (2nd season)
- Base defense: Multiple
- Home stadium: McLane Stadium

Uniform
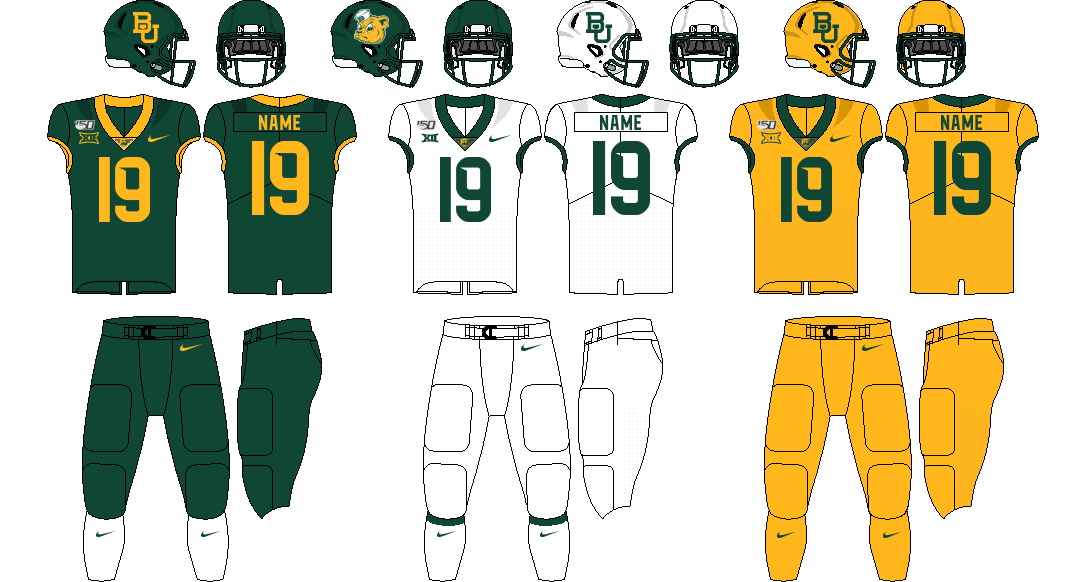

2021 Big 12 Conference football standings
	Conf.			Overall
Team	W		L	W		L
No. 7 Oklahoma State y	8	–	1	12	–	2
No. 5 Baylor y$	7	–	2	12	–	2
No. 10 Oklahoma	7	–	2	11	–	2
Iowa State	5	–	4	7	–	6
Kansas State	4	–	5	8	–	5
West Virginia	4	–	5	6	–	7
Texas	3	–	6	5	–	7
TCU	3	–	6	5	–	7
Texas Tech	3	–	6	7	–	6
Kansas	1	–	8	2	–	10
Championship: Baylor 21, Oklahoma State 16
$ – Conference champion; y – Championship game participant; Rankings from AP Poll

The 2021 Baylor Bears football team represented Baylor University during the 2021 NCAA Division I FBS football season. The Bears played their home games at McLane Stadium in Waco, Texas, and competed in the Big 12 Conference. The team was coached by second-year head coach Dave Aranda.

The Baylor Bears football team drew an average home attendance of 44,729. The Bears finished the season undefeated at home - the third such season since 2013.

== Offseason ==
=== Offseason departures ===
12 seniors from the 2020 team graduated. No players declared early for the NFL Draft.

Baylor offseason departures
Name	Number	Pos.	Height	Weight	Year	Hometown	Notes
Charlie Brewer	5	QB	6’1	210	Senior	Austin, TX	Graduated – Transferred to Utah
John Lovett	7	RB	6’0	212	Senior	Burlington, NJ	Graduated – Transferred to Penn State
Jared Atkinson	16	WR	6’3	210	Senior	Mesquite, TX	Graduated
Skyler Wetzel	20	S	5’9	190	Senior	San Antonio, TX	Graduated
Trystan Slinker	35	LB	5’11	222	Senior	Cache, OK	Graduated
Gunnar Royer	40	LS	6’2	230	Senior	Mannheim, PA	Graduated
Thor Rodoni	47	LS	6’2	225	Senior	Los Banos, CA	Graduated
Blake Bedier	56	OL	6’5	310	Senior	Lehi, UT	Graduated
Micael McNair	58	LB	6’2	220	Senior	Richardson, TX	Graduated
Jake Burton	73	OL	6’6	312	Senior	Alpine, CA	Graduated
Jay Sedwick	89	K	5'11	211	Senior	Arlington, TX	Graduated
William Bradley-King	99	LB	6’4	248	Senior	Kansas City, MO	Graduated

=== Recruiting ===
College recruiting (2020)
Name	Hometown	School	Height	Weight	Commit date
Monaray Baldwin; WR	Killeen, Texas	Shoemaker High School	5 ft 9 in (1.75 m)	165 lb (75 kg)	Dec 1, 2020
Monaray Baldwin; WR	Recruit ratings: Rivals: 247Sports: ESPN: (74)				
Elijah Bean; WR	Humble, Texas	Summer Creek High School	6 ft 5 in (1.96 m)	191 lb (87 kg)	May 15, 2020
Elijah Bean; WR	Recruit ratings: Rivals: 247Sports: ESPN: (79)				
Cameron Bonner; WR	Houston, Texas	St. Thomas High School	5 ft 11 in (1.80 m)	175 lb (79 kg)	Dec 14, 2020
Cameron Bonner; WR	Recruit ratings: Rivals: 247Sports: ESPN: (79)				
Tyrone Brown; LB	Orange, Texas	West Orange-Stark High School	5 ft 11 in (1.80 m)	203 lb (92 kg)	Oct 26, 2019
Tyrone Brown; LB	Recruit ratings: Rivals: 247Sports: ESPN: (77)				
Cisco Caston; S	Weatherford, Texas	Weatherford High School	6 ft 2 in (1.88 m)	195 lb (88 kg)	Mar 4, 2020
Cisco Caston; S	Recruit ratings: Rivals: 247Sports: ESPN: (79)				
Dakote Doyle; DT	St. Louis, Missouri	De Smet Jesuit High School	6 ft 1 in (1.85 m)	268 lb (122 kg)	May 31, 2020
Dakote Doyle; DT	Recruit ratings: Rivals: 247Sports: ESPN: (75)				
Kyron Drones; QB	Pearland, Texas	Shadow Creek High School	6 ft 2 in (1.88 m)	195 lb (88 kg)	Apr 29, 2020
Kyron Drones; QB	Recruit ratings: Rivals: 247Sports: ESPN: (80)				
Javon Gipson; WR	Richmond, Texas	George Ranch High School	6 ft 2 in (1.88 m)	187 lb (85 kg)	Mar 1, 2020
Javon Gipson; WR	Recruit ratings: Rivals: 247Sports: ESPN: (79)				
Connor Heffernan; OT	Georgetown, Texas	Georgetown High School	6 ft 4 in (1.93 m)	260 lb (120 kg)	Apr 30, 2020
Connor Heffernan; OT	Recruit ratings: Rivals: 247Sports: ESPN: (79)				
Jordan Jenkins; RB	Lindale, Texas	Lindale High School	6 ft 1 in (1.85 m)	200 lb (91 kg)	Apr 4, 2020
Jordan Jenkins; RB	Recruit ratings: Rivals: 247Sports: ESPN: (77)				
Cooper Lanz; DE	Denton, Texas	Guyer High School	6 ft 4 in (1.93 m)	242 lb (110 kg)	May 7, 2020
Cooper Lanz; DE	Recruit ratings: Rivals: 247Sports: ESPN: (75)				
Devin Lemear; S	Manor, Texas	Manor High School	6 ft 0 in (1.83 m)	172 lb (78 kg)	Dec 16, 2020
Devin Lemear; S	Recruit ratings: Rivals: 247Sports: ESPN: (78)				
Ryan Lengyel; OT	Dallas, Texas	Jesuit College Preparatory School of Dallas	6 ft 5 in (1.96 m)	275 lb (125 kg)	Aug 8, 2020
Ryan Lengyel; OT	Recruit ratings: Rivals: 247Sports: ESPN: (73)				
Jackie Marshall; LB	Reserve, Louisiana	East St. John High School	6 ft 2 in (1.88 m)	230 lb (100 kg)	Jul 4, 2020
Jackie Marshall; LB	Recruit ratings: Rivals: 247Sports: ESPN: (78)				
Romario Noel; S	Cypress, Texas	Cy Ranch High School	6 ft 3 in (1.91 m)	194 lb (88 kg)	Sep 24, 2019
Romario Noel; S	Recruit ratings: Rivals: 247Sports: ESPN: (77)				
Tate Williams; G	Wall, Texas	Wall High School	6 ft 4 in (1.93 m)	263 lb (119 kg)	May 9, 2020
Tate Williams; G	Recruit ratings: Rivals: 247Sports: ESPN: (79)				
Tevin Williams; CB	Stillwater, Oklahoma	Stillwater High School	6 ft 0 in (1.83 m)	181 lb (82 kg)	Apr 15, 2020
Tevin Williams; CB	Recruit ratings: Rivals: 247Sports: ESPN: (75)				
Overall recruit ranking: Rivals: 55 247Sports: 44 ESPN: 29
Note: In many cases, Scout, Rivals, 247Sports, On3, and ESPN may conflict in their listings of height and weight.; In these cases, the average was taken. ESPN grades are on a 100-point scale.; Sources: "Rivals commits". Rivals.; "ESPN commits". ESPN.; "2021 Team Ranking". Rivals.com.; "247Sports commits". 247Sports.

=== 2021 NFL draft ===
==== Team players drafted into the NFL ====
Round	Pick	Player	Position	NFL team
7	240	William Bradley-King	Defensive end	Washington Commanders

== Preseason ==
=== Big 12 media poll ===
Big 12 media poll
Predicted finish	Team	Votes (1st place)
1	Oklahoma	365 (35)
2	Iowa State	351 (4)
3	Texas	273
4	Oklahoma State	266
5	TCU	255
6	West Virginia	185
7	Kansas State	163
8	Baylor	124
9	Texas Tech	103
10	Kansas	39

=== Spring game ===
The Bears held spring practices in March and April 2021. The Baylor football spring "Green and Gold game" took place in Waco, TX on April 24, 2021.

== Schedule ==
Date	Time	Opponent	Rank	Site	TV	Result	Attendance
September 4	6:00 p.m.	at Texas State*		Bobcat Stadium; San Marcos, TX	ESPN+	W 29–20	26,573
September 11	6:00 p.m.	Texas Southern*		McLane Stadium; Waco, TX	ESPN+	W 66–7	42,461
September 18	2:30 p.m.	at Kansas		David Booth Kansas Memorial Stadium; Lawrence, KS	ESPN+	W 45–7	23,218
September 25	2:30 p.m.	No. 14 Iowa State		McLane Stadium; Waco, TX	FOX	W 31–29	42,539
October 2	6:00 p.m.	at No. 19 Oklahoma State	No. 21	Boone Pickens Stadium; Stillwater, OK	ESPN2	L 14–24	52,144
October 9	11:00 a.m.	West Virginia		McLane Stadium; Waco, TX	FS1	W 45–20	43,569
October 16	2:30 p.m.	No. 19 BYU*^{†}		McLane Stadium; Waco, TX	ESPN	W 38–24	48,016
October 30	11:00 a.m.	Texas	No. 16	McLane Stadium; Waco, TX (rivalry)	ABC	W 31–24	45,834
November 6	2:30 p.m.	at TCU	No. 12	Amon G. Carter Stadium; Fort Worth, TX (rivalry)	FOX	L 28–30	40,338
November 13	11:00 a.m.	No. 8 Oklahoma	No. 13	McLane Stadium; Waco, TX (Big Noon Kickoff)	FOX	W 27–14	46,782
November 20	4:30 p.m.	at Kansas State	No. 11	Bill Snyder Family Football Stadium; Manhattan, KS	FS1	W 20–10	43,857
November 27	11:00 a.m.	Texas Tech	No. 8	McLane Stadium; Waco, TX (rivalry)	FS1	W 27–24	43,901
December 4	11:00 a.m	vs. No. 5 Oklahoma State	No. 9	AT&T Stadium; Arlington, TX (Big 12 Championship Game)	ABC	W 21–16	65,771
January 1, 2022	8:00 p.m.	vs. No. 8 Ole Miss*	No. 7	Caesars Superdome; New Orleans, LA (Sugar Bowl)	ESPN	W 21–7	66,479
*Non-conference game; ^{†}Homecoming; Rankings from AP Poll (and CFP Rankings, after November 2) - Released prior to game; All times are in Central time

Schedule source:

== Personnel ==
=== Roster ===
2021 Baylor Bears Football
Quarterback: 11 Gerry Bohanon – (redshirt) junior (6'3, 221); 12 Blake Shapen – (redshirt) freshman (6'0, 192); 14 Jacob Zeno – (redshirt) sophomore (6'2, 211); 15 Kyron Drones – freshman (6'2, 222); 17 CJ Rogers – freshman (6'3, 200); 18 Brandon Bass – (redshirt) junior (5'10, 195); Running back: 1 Trestan Ebner – 5th year senior (5'11, 215); 7 Abram Smith – (redshirt) senior (5'11, 221); 13 Qualan Jones – (redshirt) sophomore (5'11, 230); 20 Craig Williams – (redshirt) sophomore (5'8, 173); 22 Taye McWilliams – (redshirt) sophomore (6'1, 211); 23 Jordan Jenkins – freshman (6'1, 208); 25 Jacoby Clarke – (redshirt) sophomore (6'0, 205); 33 Jonah White – (redshirt) sophomore (6'0, 220); Wide receiver: 0 R.J. Sneed – (redshirt) senior (6'1, 203); 6 Gavin Holmes – (redshirt) junior (5'11, 207); 9 Tyquan Thornton – (redshirt) senior (6'3, 182); 15 Tripp Mitchell – (redshirt) sophomore (6'1, 195); 16 Hal Presley – freshman (6'3, 197); 17 Jackson Gleeson – (redshirt) junior (6'0, 185); 18 Drew Estrada – 6th year senior (6'0, 196); 19 Javon Gipson – freshman (6'3, 192); 21 Josh Fleeks – senior (5'11, 192); 24 Cameron Bonner – freshman (5'11, 175); 26 Jonah Burton – freshman (6'0, 190); 27 Kolby White – sophomore (5'8, 175); 34 Josh Cameron – freshman (6'2, 210); 80 Monaray Baldwin – freshman (5'9, 165); 81 Jonathan Davidson – (redshirt) freshman (6'1, 210); 83 Elijah Bean – freshman (6'5, 203); 84 Jaylen Ellis – (redshirt) sophomore (6'0, 194); 88 Seth Jones – (redshirt) freshman (5'11, 190); Placekicker: 95 John Mayers – junior (5'10, 187); 96 Bryce Boland – (redshirt) freshman (5'11, 172); 97 Chris Esqueda-Almanza – sophomore (5'8, 185); 98 Isaiah Hankins – freshman (6'0, 193); 99 Noah Rauschenberg – junior (6'1, 195); Punter: 43 Issac Power – junior (6'1, 200)	Offensive line: 50 Connor Heffernan – freshman (6'4, 283); 52 Jackson Kimble – junior (6'3, 303); 54 Micah Mazzccua – (redshirt) freshman (6'4, 326); 55 Xavier Newman-Johnson – 5th Year Senior (6'2, 315); 57 Johncarlo Valentin – 5th Year Senior (6'4, 345); 58 Gavin Byers – sophomore (6'5, 320); 62 Ryan Lengyel – freshman (6'5, 285); 63 Grant Miller – senior (6'4, 309); 64 Khalil Keith – senior (6'5, 329); 65 Clayton Collier – freshman (6'3, 280); 66 Jacob Gall – senior (6'2, 305); 68 Jacob Frater – sophomore (6'3, 280); 71 MJ Ruhman – freshman (6'5, 270); 72 Mose Jeffery – senior (6'4, 320); 75 Elijah Ellis – sophomore (6'6, 320); 76 Connor Galvin – senior (6'7, 310); 77 Tate Williams – freshman (6'4, 290); Defensive line: 50 Dakote Doyle-Robinson – freshman (6'1, 270); 54 Brayden Utley – junior (6'1, 270); 57 Prince Ugoh – freshman (6'2, 247); 62 Siaki Ika – sophomore (6'4, 350); 90 TJ Franklin – junior (6'4, 290); 91 Rob Saulin – senior (6'5, 295); 92 Josh Landry – junior (6'1, 285); 94 Frank Jin – sophomore (6'1, 280); 95 Gabe Hall – sophomore (6'5, 290); 96 Cole Maxwell – senior (6'5, 295); 97 Cooper Lanz – freshman (6'4, 255); 98 Chidi Ogbonnaya – senior (6'5, 305); Tight end: 29 Jackson Shupp – (redshirt) junior (6'4, 284); 43 Gavin Yates – freshman (6'3, 240); 82 Tyler Henderson – (redshirt) junior (6'4,253); 86 Ben Sims – (redshirt) junior (6'4, 253); 87 Christoph Henle – senior (6'6, 255); 89 Drake Dabney – sophomore (6'5, 252); Long snapper: 40 Gunnar Royer – 5th year senior (6'2, 220); 41 Garrison Grimes – freshman (6'2, 200); 47 Thor Rodoni – 6th year senior (6'2, 222)	Linebacker: 2 Terrel Bernard – senior (6'1, 222); 5 Dillon Doyle – junior (6'3, 242); 33 Will Williams – sophomore (6'2, 215); 35 Jackie Marshall – freshman (6'2, 235); 36 Tyrone M. Brown – freshman (6'0, 225); 41 Brooks Miller – (redshirt) freshman (6'1, 228); 47 Caleb Parker – (redshirt) freshman (6'0, 210); 49 Will Garner – (redshirt) freshman (6'2, 215); 52 Matt Jones – sophomore (6'3, 237); 53 Ben Hamilton – (redshirt) freshman (6'1, 195); 53 Bradon Strauss – (redshirt) freshman (5'11, 217); 58 Jaden Maronen – freshman (6'0, 225); Defensive back: 3 Raleigh Texada – 6th Year Senior (5'10, 188); 4 Christian Morgan – senior (6'1, 214); 8 Jalen Pitre – senior (6'0, 197); 11 Lorando Johnson – (redshirt) freshman (5'11, 200); 12 Kalon Barnes – senior (6'0, 186); 13 Al Walcott – junior (6'2, 211); 14 Devin Neal – sophomore (5'11, 202); 16 Mike Harris – (redshirt) freshman (5'10, 170); 19 AJ McCarty – (redshirt) freshman (5'11, 194); 20 Devin Lemear – freshman (6'0, 177); 21 Chateau Reed – (redshirt) freshman (6'2, 188); 22 JT Woods – senior (6'2, 193); 23 Zeke Brown – 6th Year Senior (6'0, 180); 24 Brandon White – sophomore (6'0, 201); 25 Byron Hanspard Jr. – junior (6'0, 189); 26 Cisco Caston – freshman (6'2, 195); 27 Tevin Williams III – freshman (6'1, 183); 29 Romario Noel – freshman (6'2, 202); 31 Griffin Speaks – sophomore (6'0, 185); 37 Mark Milton – junior (6'1, 185); 38 Shevin Smith – sophomore (5'11, 163); 39 Colby Delashaw – junior (6'0, 194); 42 Jarion McVea – 6th Year Senior (5'9, 185); 48 Collin Losack – sophomore (5'10, 180); 59 Michael Mastrodicasa – freshman (6'0, 188)

=== Coaching staff ===
Coach	Title	Year at Baylor	Previous job
Dave Aranda	Head Coach	2nd	LSU (DC)
Joey McGuire^{‡}	Assoc. HC/OLB	5th	Cedar Hill High School (HC)
Jeff Grimes	OC/TE	1st	BYU (OC)
Ron Roberts	DC/ILB	2nd	Louisiana (DC)
Caleb Collins^{ƒ}	OLB	2nd	LSU Tigers football (Quality Control Coach - Defense)
Shawn Bell	QB	5th	Cedar Ridge High School (HC)
Kevin Curtis	CB	1st	SMU (CB)
Dennis Johnson	DL	2nd	LSU (DL)
Justin Johnson	RB	2nd	Houston (RB)
Eric Mateos	OL	1st	BYU (OL)
Matt Powledge	S/ST	2nd	Louisiana (OLB/ST)
Chansi Stuckey	WR	1st	Clemson (offensive staff)

^{‡} On November 8, 2021 and during the middle of the 2021 college football season, Joey McGuire was hired by Texas Tech University to replace the recently fired Matt Wells as the Red Raiders' next head football coach. As such, McGuire departed the Baylor Bears' 2021 football staff immediately and did not finish the season with the Bears.

^{ƒ} Collins was promoted in November 2021 to replace Joey McGuire as the Bears' OLB coach.

== Game summaries ==
=== At Texas State ===
Uniform Combination
Helmet	Jersey	Pants

Baylor Bears (0–0) vs. Texas State Bobcats (0–0)

Quarter	1	2	3	4	Total
Baylor	7	7	10	5	29
Texas State	3	7	3	7	20

at Bobcat Stadium • San Marcos, TX

- Date: Saturday, September 4, 2021
- Game time: 6:00 p.m. CDT
- Game weather: sunny • Temperature: 95°F
- Game attendance: 26,573
- Referee: Wayne Winkler
- TV announcers (ESPN+): Brant Freeman (play-by-play), Keith Moreland (analyst) & Koral Riggs (sideline)

Game information

First Quarter

- (11:57) BU – JT Woods 20 yard interception, Isaiah Hankins kick (BU 7–0)
- (6:02) TXST – Seth Keller 21 yard field goal (Drive: 14 plays, 72 yards, 5:51; BU 7–3)

Second Quarter

- (6:41) TXST – Marcell Barbee 12 yard pass from Brady McBride, Seth Keller kick (Drive: 11 plays, 77 yards, 5:38; TXST 10–7)
- (0:36) BU – Abram Smith 3 yard run, Isaiah Hankins kick (Drive: 13 plays, 75 yards, 6:05; BU 14–10)

Third Quarter

- (8:50) BU – Isaiah Hankins 43 yard field goal (Drive: 7 plays, 33 yards, 2:59; BU 17–10)
- (4:21) BU – Abram Smith 12 yard run, Isaiah Hankins kick (Drive: 5 plays, 70 yards, 2:29; BU 24–10)
- (0:45) TXST – Seth Keller 38 yard field goal (Drive: 10 plays, 54 yards, 3:36; BU 24–13)

Fourth Quarter

- (9:35) BU – Isaiah Hankins 26 yard field goal (Drive: 5 plays, 18 yards, 2:43; BU 27–13)
- (1:19) TXST – Jahmyl Jeter 2 yard run, Seth Keller kick (Drive: 10 plays, 65 yards, 2:04; BU 27–20)
- (0:00) BU – 0 yard safety (BU 29–20)

Statistics	BU	TXST
First downs	22	20
Total yards	386	235
Rushes/yards	45/238	27/79
Passing yards	148	156
Passing: Comp–Att–Int	15–24–0	20–40–3
Time of possession	34:48	25:12

Team	Category	Player	Statistics
Baylor	Passing	Gerry Bohanon	15–24, 148 yards
Baylor	Rushing	Trestan Ebner	20 carries, 120 yards
Baylor	Receiving	R.J. Sneed	6 receptions, 92 yards
Texas State	Passing	Brady McBride	20–40, 156 yards, 1 TD, 3 INT
Texas State	Rushing	Jahmyl Jeter	8 carries, 45 yards, 1 TD
Texas State	Receiving	Marcell Barbee	4 receptions, 56 yards, 1 TD

=== Vs. Texas Southern ===
Uniform Combination
Helmet	Jersey	Pants

Texas Southern Tigers (0–1) vs. Baylor Bears (1–0)

Quarter	1	2	3	4	Total
Texas Southern	0	0	0	7	7
Baylor	21	21	10	14	66

at McLane Stadium • Waco, TX

- Date: Saturday, September 11, 2021
- Game time: 6:00 p.m. CDT
- Game weather: sunny • Temperature: 91°F
- Game attendance: 42,461
- Referee: Kevin Mar
- TV announcers (ESPN+): Shawn Kenney, Ryan Leaf

Game information

First Quarter

- (9:41) BU – Abram Smith 20 yard run, Isaiah Hankins kick (Drive: 12 plays, 93 yards, 5:19; BU 7–0)
- (8:12) BU – Tyquan Thornton 48 yard pass from Gerry Bohanon, Isaiah Hankins kick (Drive: 1 play, 48 yards, 0:08; BU 14–0)
- (3:44) BU – Gerry Bohanon 7 yard run, Isaiah Hankins kick (Drive: 5 plays, 85 yards, 2:44; BU 21–0)

Second Quarter

- (10:25) BU – Gerry Bohanon 10 yard run, Isaiah Hankins kick (Drive: 10 plays, 60 yards, 4:51; BU 28–0)
- (5:46) BU – Abram Smith 35 yard run, Isaiah Hankins kick (Drive: 6 plays, 82 yards, 3:07; BU 35–0)
- (0:05) BU – Tyquan Thornton 18 yard pass from Gerry Bohanon, Isaiah Hankins kick (Drive: 9 plays, 80 yards, 2:38; BU 42–0)

Third Quarter

- (7:24) BU – Trestan Ebner 12 yard pass from Gerry Bohanon, Isaiah Hankins kick (7 plays, 86 yards, 3:20; BU 49–0)
- (1:40) BU – Isaiah Hankins 37 yard field goal (7 plays, 45 yards, 3:02; BU 52–0)

Fourth Quarter

- (12:34) BU – JT Woods 97 yard fumble recovery, Isaiah Hankins kick (BU 59–0)
- (8:00) TXSO – Kevin Harris 1 yard run, Richard Garcia III kick (Drive: 10 plays, 75 yards, 4:34; BU 59–7)
- (6:46) BU – Taye McWilliams 14 yard run, Isaiah Hankins kick (Drive: 4 plays, 75 yards, 6:46; BU 66–7)

Statistics	TXSO	BU
First downs	16	33
Total yards	281	714
Rushes/yards	40/161	43/419
Passing yards	120	295
Passing: Comp–Att–Int	12–22–0	19–26–0
Time of possession	27:56	32:04

Team	Category	Player	Statistics
Texas Southern	Passing	Jalen Brown	7–12, 96 yards
Texas Southern	Rushing	Jacorey Howard	11 carries, 68 yards
Texas Southern	Receiving	Ke'Lenn Davis	2 receptions, 45 yards
Baylor	Passing	Gerry Bohanon	17–23, 247 yards, 3 TD
Baylor	Rushing	Abram Smith	12 carries, 126 yards, 2 TD
Baylor	Receiving	Tyquan Thornton	5 receptions, 103 yards, 2 TD

=== At Kansas ===
Uniform Combination
Helmet	Jersey	Pants

Baylor Bears (2–0) vs. Kansas Jayhawks (1–1)

Quarter	1	2	3	4	Total
Baylor	7	7	14	17	45
Kansas	0	7	0	0	7

at David Booth Kansas Memorial Stadium • Lawrence, KS

- Date: Saturday, September 18, 2021
- Game time: 2:30 p.m. CDT
- Game weather: sunny • Temperature: 88°F
- Game attendance: 23,218
- Referee: Michael Vandervelde
- TV announcers (ESPN+): Courtney Lyle, Ryan Leaf

Game information

First Quarter

- (10:29) BU – Ben Sims 14 yard pass from Gerry Bohanon, Isaiah Hankins kick (Drive: 9 plays, 75 yards, 4:31; BU 7–0)

Second Quarter

- (13:42) BU – Gavin Yates 2 yard run, Isaiah Hankins kick (Drive: 4 plays, 39 yards, 1:36; BU 14–0)
- (0:58) KAN – Trevor Wilson 5 yard pass from Jason Bean, Jacob Borcila kick (Drive: 11 plays, 76 yards, 5:23; BU 14–7)

Third Quarter

- (12:44) BU – RJ Sneed 69 yard pass from Gerry Bohanon, Isaiah Hankins kick (Drive: 1 play, 69 yards, 0:16; BU 21–7)
- (9:06) BU – Abram Smith 4 yard run, Isaiah Hankins kick (Drive: 8 plays, 57 yards, 3:13; BU 28–7)

Fourth Quarter

- (13:38) BU – Gerry Bohanon 9 yard run, Isaiah Hankins kick (Drive: 6 plays, 57 yards, 2:22; BU 35–7)
- (7:08) BU – Taye McWilliams 20 yard run, Isaiah Hankins kick (Drive: 9 plays, 81 yards, 4:58; BU 42–7)
- (3:34) BU – Isaiah Hankins 48 yard field goal (Drive: 4 plays, 8 yards, 1:30; BU 45–7)

Statistics	BU	KAN
First downs	29	8
Total yards	576	166
Rushes/yards	45/307	33/109
Passing yards	269	57
Passing: Comp–Att–Int	19–24–0	8–18–0
Time of possession	33:22	26:38

Team	Category	Player	Statistics
Baylor	Passing	Gerry Bohanon	19–23, 269 yards, 2 TD
Baylor	Rushing	Abram Smith	16 carries, 122 yards, 1 TD
Baylor	Receiving	RJ Sneed	6 receptions, 128 yards, 1 TD
Kansas	Passing	Jason Bean	8–17, 57 yards, 1 TD
Kansas	Rushing	Jason Bean	12 carries, 62 yards
Kansas	Receiving	Luke Grimm	2 receptions, 25 yards

=== Vs. No. 14 Iowa State ===
Uniform Combination
Helmet	Jersey	Pants

No. 14 Iowa State Cyclones (2–1) vs. Baylor Bears (3–0)

Quarter	1	2	3	4	Total
No. 14 Iowa State	7	6	10	6	29
Baylor	7	14	7	3	31

at McLane Stadium • Waco, TX

- Date: Saturday, September 25, 2021
- Game time: 2:30 p.m. CDT
- Game weather: sunny • Temperature: 87°F
- Game attendance: 42,539
- Referee: Tuta Salaam
- TV announcers (FOX): Joe Davis (play-by-play) and Brock Huard (analyst)

Game information

First Quarter

- (9:26) ISU – Breece Hall 2 yard run, Andrew Mevis kick (Drive: 10 plays, 75 yards, 5:34; ISU 7–0)
- (5:34) BU – Gerry Bohanon 8 yard run, Isaiah Hankins kick (Drive: 8 plays, 75 yards, 3:52; 7–7)

Second Quarter

- (14:53) BU – Tyquan Thornton 21 yard pass from Gerry Bohanon, Isaiah Hankins kick (Drive: 6 plays, 56 yards, 2:22; BU 14–7)
- (10:10) ISU – Andrew Mevis 40 yard field goal (Drive: 9 plays, 52 yards, 4:43; BU 14–10)
- (5:37) BU – Ben Sims 33 yards pass from Gerry Bohanon, Isaiah Hankins kick (Drive: 9 plays, 75 yards, 4:33; BU 21–10)
- (0:04) ISU – Andrew Mevis 38 yard field goal (Drive: 7 plays, 65 yards, 0:55; BU 21–13)

Third Quarter

- (7:13) ISU – Andrew Mevis 39 yard field goal (Drive: 9 plays, 55 yards, 4:13; BU 21–16)
- (6:59) BU – Trestan Ebner 98 yard kickoff return, Isaiah Hankins kick (BU 28–16)
- (0:39) ISU – Breece Hall 2 yard run, Connor Assalley kick (Drive: 5 plays, 85 yards, 2:08; BU 28–23)

Fourth Quarter

- (5:36) BU – Isaiah Hankins 34 yard field goal (Drive: 4 plays, -1 yard, 2:04; BU 31–23)
- (0:24) ISU – Breece Hall 16 yard pass from Brock Purdy, 2 point conversion failed (Drive: 13 plays, 75 yards, 5:12; BU 31–29)

Statistics	ISU	BU
First downs	27	15
Total yards	479	282
Rushes/yards	40/216	33/123
Passing yards	263	159
Passing: Comp–Att–Int	22–33–1	14–19–0
Time of possession	35:39	24:21

Team	Category	Player	Statistics
Iowa State	Passing	Brock Purdy	22–33, 263 yards, 1 TD, 1 INT
Iowa State	Rushing	Breece Hall	27 carries, 190 yards, 2 TD
Iowa State	Receiving	Chase Allen	7 receptions, 98 yards
Baylor	Passing	Gerry Bohanon	14–19, 164 yards, 2 TD
Baylor	Rushing	Abram Smith	10 carries, 47 yards
Baylor	Receiving	R.J. Sneed	4 receptions, 57 yards

=== At No. 19 Oklahoma State ===
Uniform Combination
Helmet	Jersey	Pants

No. 21 Baylor Bears (4–0) vs. No. 19 Oklahoma State Cowboys (4–0)

Quarter	1	2	3	4	Total
No. 21 Baylor	0	0	7	7	14
No. 19 Oklahoma State	7	7	0	10	24

at Boone Pickens Stadium • Stillwater, OK

- Date: Saturday, October 2, 2021
- Game time: 6:00 p.m. CDT
- Game weather: cloudy • Temperature: 78°F
- Game attendance: 52,144
- Referee: Derek Anderson
- TV announcers (ESPN2): Mark Jones, Robert Griffin III, Quint Kessenich

Game information

First Quarter

- (10:40) OKST – Jaylen Warren 8 yard run, Tanner Brown kick (Drive: 12 plays, 75 yards, 4:20; OKST 7–0)

Second Quarter

- (0:36) OKST – Rashod Owens 32 yard pass from Spencer Sanders, Tanner Brown kick (Drive: 6 plays, 69 yards, 2:01; OKST 14–0)

Third Quarter

- (3:14) BU – Abram Smith 55 yard run, Isaiah Hankins kick (Drive: 4 plays, 63 yards, 1:32; OKST 14–7)

Fourth Quarter

- (14:56) OKST – Tanner Brown 20 yard field goal (Drive: 10 plays, 72 yards, 3:18; OKST 17–7)
- (12:04) BU – Gerry Bohanon 1 yard run, Isaiah Hankins kick (Drive: 7 plays, 84 yards, 2:44; OKST 17–14)
- (2:10) OKST – Jaylen Warren 4 yard run, Tanner Brown kick (Drive: 8 plays, 56 yards, 3:22; OKST 24–14)

Statistics	BU	OKST
First downs	10	24
Total yards	280	401
Rushes/yards	29/107	59/219
Passing yards	173	182
Passing: Comp–Att–Int	13–27–0	13–23–3
Time of possession	25:33	34:27

Team	Category	Player	Statistics
Baylor	Passing	Gerry Bohanon	13–27, 173 yards
Baylor	Rushing	Abram Smith	10 carries, 97 yards, 1 TD
Baylor	Receiving	Drew Estrada	6 receptions, 88 yards
Oklahoma State	Passing	Spencer Sanders	13–23, 182 yards, 1 TD, 3 INT
Oklahoma State	Rushing	Jaylen Warren	36 carries, 125 yards, 2 TD
Oklahoma State	Receiving	Tay Martin	6 receptions, 110 yards

=== Vs. West Virginia ===
Uniform Combination
Helmet	Jersey	Pants

West Virginia Mountaineers (2–3) vs. Baylor Bears (4–1)

Quarter	1	2	3	4	Total
West Virginia	7	3	3	7	20
Baylor	21	7	14	3	45

at McLane Stadium • Waco, TX

- Date: Saturday, October 9, 2021
- Game time: 11:00 a.m. CDT
- Game weather: sunny • Temperature: 80°F
- Game attendance: 43,569
- Referee: Kevin Hassel
- TV announcers (FS1): Cory Provus, Mark Helfrich

Game information

First Quarter

- (14:19) BU – Tyquan Thornton 75 yard pass from Gerry Bohanon, Isaiah Hankins kick (Drive: 2 plays, 75 yards, 0:41; BU 7–0)
- (12:41) WVU – Sean Ryan 12 yard pass from Jarret Doege, Casey Legg kick (Drive: 6 plays, 75 yards, 1:38; 7–7)
- (9:22) BU – Ben Sims 10 yard pass from Gerry Bohanon, Isaiah Hankins kick (Drive: 8 plays, 75 yards, 3:19; BU 14–7)
- (5:24) BU – Gerry Bohanon 1 yard run, Isaiah Hankins kick (Drive: 5 plays, 48 yards, 2:09; BU 21–7)

Second Quarter

- (9:52) BU – Tyquan Thornton 11 yard pass from Gerry Bohanon, Isaiah Hankins kick (Drive: 5 plays, 86 yards, 1:48; BU 28–7)
- (6:17) WVU – Casey Legg 29 yard field goal (Drive: 11 plays, 66 yards, 3:30; BU 28–10)

Third Quarter

- (9:17) WVU – Casey Legg 27 yard field goal (Drive: 12 plays, 78 yards, 5:43; BU 28–13)
- (8:43) BU – Ben Sims 29 yard pass from Gerry Bohanon, Isaiah Hankins kick (Drive: 3 plays, 47 yards, 0:33; BU 35–13)
- (4:37) BU – Abram Smith 31 yard run, Isaiah Hankins kick (Drive: 6 plays, 69 yards, 1:48; BU 42–13)

Fourth Quarter

- (10:12) BU – Isaiah Hankins 45 yard field goal (Drive: 9 plays, 46 yards, 3:09; BU 45–13)
- (4:18) WVU – Garrett Greene 13 yard run, Casey Legg kick (Drive: 12 plays, 85 yards, 5:48; BU 45–20)

Statistics	WVU	BU
First downs	24	21
Total yards	362	525
Rushes/yards	38/90	32/171
Passing yards	272	354
Passing: Comp–Att–Int	24–37–1	20–31–0
Time of possession	34:21	25:39

Team	Category	Player	Statistics
West Virginia	Passing	Jarret Doege	20–31, 237 yards, 1 TD, 1 INT
West Virginia	Rushing	Garrett Greene	10 carries, 55 yards, 1 TD
West Virginia	Receiving	Winston Wright Jr.	6 receptions, 86 yards
Baylor	Passing	Gerry Bohanon	18–29, 336 yards, 4 TD
Baylor	Rushing	Abram Smith	11 carries, 87 yards, 1 TD
Baylor	Receiving	Tyquan Thornton	8 receptions, 187 yards, 2 TD

=== Vs. No. 19 BYU ===
Uniform Combination
Helmet	Jersey	Pants

No. 19 BYU Cougars (5–1) vs. Baylor Bears (5–1)

Quarter	1	2	3	4	Total
No. 19 BYU	0	7	7	10	24
Baylor	3	14	14	7	38

at McLane Stadium • Waco, TX

- Date: Saturday, October 16, 2021
- Game time: 2:30 p.m. CDT
- Game weather: sunny • Temperature: 73°F
- Game attendance: 48,016
- Referee: Brandon Cruse
- TV announcers (ESPN): Mark Jones, Robert Griffin III, Quint Kessenich

Game information

First Quarter

- (1:11) BU – Isaiah Hankins 31 yard field goal (Drive: 8 plays, 53 yards, 3:05; BU 3–0)

Second Quarter

- (12:17) BYU – Tyler Allgeier 1 yard run, Jake Oldroyd kick (Drive: 8 plays, 75 yards, 3:54; BYU 7–3)
- (8:54) BU – Abram Smith 9 yard run, Isaiah Hankins kick (Drive: 7 plays, 75 yards, 3:23, BU 10–7)
- (3:36) BU – Dillon Doyle 2 yard run, Isaiah Hankins kick (Drive: 8 plays, 67 yards, 3:32; BU 17–7)

Third Quarter

- (12:18) BYU – Jaren Hall 56 yard run, Jake Oldroyd kick (Drive: 6 plays, 75 yards, 2:42; BU 17–14)
- (7:55) BU – Dillon Doyle 2 yard pass from Gerry Bohanon, Isaiah Hankins kick (Drive: 9 plays, 78 yards, 4:18; BU 24–14)
- (4:32) BU – Abram Smith 7 yard run, Isaiah Hankins kick (Drive: 4 plays, 67 yards, 1:57; BU 31–14)

Fourth Quarter

- (10:28) BYU – Jake Oldroyd 48 yard field goal (Drive: 12 plays, 43 yards, 4:47; BU 31–17)
- (3:55) BU – Abram Smith 1 yard run, Isaiah Hankins kick (Drive: 12 plays, 82 yards, 6:33; BU 38–17)
- (1:51) BYU – Puka Nacua 16 yard pass from Jaren Hall, Jake Oldroyd kick (Drive: 7 plays, 75 yards, 2:04; BU 38–24)

Statistics	BYU	BU
First downs	15	22
Total yards	409	534
Rushes/yards	24/67	47/303
Passing yards	342	231
Passing: Comp–Att–Int	22–31–0	18–28–1
Time of possession	24:24	35:36

Team	Category	Player	Statistics
BYU	Passing	Jaren Hall	22–31, 342 yards, 1 TD
BYU	Rushing	Tyler Allgeier	15 carries, 33 yards, 1 TD
BYU	Receiving	Puka Nacua	5 receptions, 168 yards, 1 TD
Baylor	Passing	Gerry Bohanon	18–28, 231 yards, 1 TD, 1 INT
Baylor	Rushing	Abram Smith	27 carries, 188 yards, 3 TD
Baylor	Receiving	Tyquan Thornton	5 receptions, 84 yards

=== Vs. Texas ===
Uniform Combination
Helmet	Jersey	Pants

Texas Longhorns (4–3) vs. No. 16 Baylor Bears (6–1)

Quarter	1	2	3	4	Total
Texas	14	0	7	3	24
No. 16 Baylor	10	0	7	14	31

at McLane Stadium • Waco, TX

- Date: Saturday, October 30, 2021
- Game time: 11:00 a.m. CDT
- Game weather: sunny • Temperature: 61°F
- Game attendance: 45,834
- Referee: David Alvarez
- TV announcers (ABC): Joe Tessitore, Greg McElroy

Game information

First Quarter

- (12:34) TEX – Joshua Moore 10 yard pass from Casey Thompson, Cameron Dicker kick (Drive: 4 plays, 31 yards, 1:43; TEX 7–0)
- (7:32) BU – RJ Sneed 6 yard pass from Tyquan Thornton, Isaiah Hankins kick (Drive: 11 plays, 75 yards, 5:02; 7–7)
- (0:56) BU – Isaiah Hankins 38 yard field goal (Drive: 9 plays, 53 yards, 4:33; BU 10–7)
- (0:24) TEX – Xavier Worthy 63 yard pass from Casey Thompson, Cameron Dicker kick (Drive: 2 plays, 75 yards, 0:32; TEX 14–10)

Second Quarter

No scoring

Third Quarter

- (8:49) TEX – Bijan Robinson 1 yard run, Cameron Dicker kick (Drive: 14 plays, 75 yards, 6:11; TEX 21–10)
- (4:45) BU – Gerry Bohanon 6 yard run, Isaiah Hankins kick (Drive: 9 plays, 75 yards, 4:04; TEX 21–17)

Fourth Quarter

- (12:48) BU – Ben Sims 1 yard run, Isaiah Hankins kick (Drive: 14 plays, 80 yards, 5:36; BU 24–21)
- (7:59) BU – Abram Smith 32 yard run; Isaiah Hankins kick (Drive: 3 plays 53 yards, 1:24; BU 31–21)
- (4:40) TEX – Cameron Dicker 27 yard field goal (Drive: 10 plays 66 yards, 3:19; BU 31–24)

Statistics	TEX	BU
First downs	18	23
Total yards	382	427
Rushes/yards	29/102	42/199
Passing yards	280	228
Passing: Comp–Att–Int	23–38–1	19–32–2
Time of possession	27:06	32:54

Team	Category	Player	Statistics
Texas	Passing	Casey Thompson	23–38, 280 yards, 2 TD, 1 INT
Texas	Rushing	Bijan Robinson	17 carries, 43 yards, 1 TD
Texas	Receiving	Xavier Worthy	4 receptions, 115 yards, 1 TD
Baylor	Passing	Gerry Bohanon	18–31, 222 yards, 2 INT
Baylor	Rushing	Abram Smith	20 carries, 113 yards, 1 TD
Baylor	Receiving	RJ Sneed	8 receptions, 94 yards, 1 TD

=== At TCU ===
Uniform Combination
Helmet	Jersey	Pants

No. 12 Baylor Bears (7–1) vs. TCU Horned Frogs (3–5)

Quarter	1	2	3	4	Total
No. 12 Baylor	7	7	7	7	28
TCU	7	9	7	7	30

at Amon G. Carter Stadium • Fort Worth, TX

- Date: Saturday, November 6, 2021
- Game time: 2:30 p.m. CDT
- Game weather: sunny • Temperature: 67°F
- Game attendance: 40,338
- Referee: Tuta Salaam
- TV announcers (FOX): Tim Brando (play-by-play) and Spencer Tillman (analyst)

Game information

First Quarter

- (10:53) BU – Tyquan Thornton 7 yard pass from Gerry Bohanon, Isaiah Hankins kick (Drive: 3 plays, 62 yards, 1:14; BU 7–0)
- (6:59) TCU – Chandler Morris 12 yard run, Griffin Kell kick (Drive: 4 plays, 82 yards, 1:38; 7–7)

Second Quarter

- (13:29) TCU – Griffin Kell 30 yard field goal (Drive: 11 plays, 64 yards, 5:19; TCU 10–7)
- (9:16) TCU – Griffin Kell 46 yard field goal (Drive: 7 plays, 10 yards, 1:55; TCU 13–7)
- (2:57) BU – Drake Dabney 21 yard pass from Gerry Bohanon, Isaiah Hankins kick (Drive: 11 plays, 75 yards, 6:19; BU 14–13)
- (0:59) TCU – Griffin Kell 24 yard field goal (Drive: 10 plays, 68 yards, 1:58; TCU 16–14)

Third Quarter

- (7:07) TCU – Dominic DiNunzio 5 yard pass from Chandler Morris, Griffin Kell kick (Drive: 12 plays, 83 yards, 6:16; TCU 23–14)
- (3:01) BU – Trestan Ebner 1 yard run, Isaiah Hankins kick (Drive: 7 plays, 75 yards, 4:06; TCU 23–21)

Fourth Quarter

- (11:59) TCU – Quentin Johnston 19 yard pass from Chandler Morris, Griffin Kell kick (Drive: 12 plays, 80 yards, 4:02; TCU 30–21)
- (5:04) BU – Tyquan Thornton 4 yard pass from Gerry Bohanon, Isaiah Hankins kick (Drive: 13 plays, 86 yards, 6:44; TCU 30–28)

Statistics	BU	TCU
First downs	17	27
Total yards	393	562
Rushes/yards	36/179	35/94
Passing yards	214	468
Passing: Comp–Att–Int	14–20–2	30–42–0
Time of possession	29:36	30:24

Team	Category	Player	Statistics
Baylor	Passing	Gerry Bohanon	14–20, 214 yards, 3 TD, 2 INT
Baylor	Rushing	Abram Smith	18 carries, 125 yards
Baylor	Receiving	Tyquan Thornton	5 receptions, 121 yards, 2 TD
TCU	Passing	Chandler Morris	29–41, 461 yards, 2 TD
TCU	Rushing	Chandler Morris	11 carries, 70 yards, 1 TD
TCU	Receiving	Quentin Johnston	5 receptions, 142 yards, 1 TD

=== Vs. No. 8 Oklahoma ===
Uniform Combination
Helmet	Jersey	Pants

No. 8 Oklahoma Sooners (9–0) vs. No. 13 Baylor Bears (7–2)

Quarter	1	2	3	4	Total
No. 8 Oklahoma	0	7	0	7	14
No. 13 Baylor	0	7	3	17	27

at McLane Stadium • Waco, TX

- Date: Saturday, November 13, 2021
- Game time: 11:00 a.m. CST
- Game weather: sunny • Temperature: 57°F
- Game attendance: 46,782
- Referee: Kevin Mar
- TV announcers (FOX): Gus Johnson, Joel Klatt

Game information

First Quarter

No scoring

Second Quarter

- (10:20) OKLA – Caleb Williams 2 yard run, Gabe Brkic kick (Drive: 9 plays, 78 yards, 4:01; OKLA 7–0)
- (4:44) BU – Tyquan Thornton 8 yard pass from Gerry Bohanon, Isaiah Hankins kick (Drive: 10 plays, 75 yards, 5:36; 7–7)

Third Quarter

- (11:49) BU – Isaiah Hankins 32 yard field goal (Drive: 7 plays, 51 yards, 3:11; BU 10–7)

Fourth Quarter

- (13:13) BU – Gerry Bohanon 5 yard run, Isaiah Hankins kick (Drive: 3 plays, 83 yards, 1:32; BU 17–7)
- (3:57) BU – Gerry Bohanon 14 yard run, Isaiah Hankins kick (Drive: 11 plays, 80 yards, 5:50; BU 24–7)
- (2:26) OKLA – Kennedy Brooks 1 yard run, Gabe Brkic kick (Drive: 4 plays, 75 yards, 1:31; BU 24–14)
- (0:00) BU – Isaiah Hankins 32 yard field goal (Drive: 6 plays, 17 yards, 2:26; BU 27–14)

Statistics	OKLA	BU
First downs	17	24
Total yards	260	414
Rushes/yards	28/78	27/297
Passing yards	182	117
Passing: Comp–Att–Int	14–25–2	12–21–1
Time of possession	24:41	35:19

Team	Category	Player	Statistics
Oklahoma	Passing	Caleb Williams	10–19, 146 yards, 2 INT
Oklahoma	Rushing	Kennedy Brooks	13 carries, 51 yards, 1 TD
Oklahoma	Receiving	Michael Woods II	4 receptions, 53 yards
Baylor	Passing	Gerry Bohanon	12–21, 117 yards, 1 TD, 1 INT
Baylor	Rushing	Abram Smith	20 carries, 148 yards
Baylor	Receiving	Tyquan Thornton	4 receptions, 41 yards, 1 TD

=== At Kansas State ===
Uniform Combination
Helmet	Jersey	Pants

No. 11 Baylor Bears (8–2) vs. Kansas State Wildcats (7–3)

Quarter	1	2	3	4	Total
No. 11 Baylor	7	10	0	3	20
Kansas State	0	7	3	0	10

at Bill Snyder Family Stadium • Manhattan, KS

- Date: Saturday, November 20, 2021
- Game time: 4:30 p.m. CST
- Game weather: sunny • Temperature: 56°F
- Game attendance: 43,857
- Referee: Derek Anderson
- TV announcers (FS1): Aaron Goldsmith, Mark Helfrich

Game information

First Quarter

- (11:09) BU – Trestan Ebner 6 yard run, Isaiah Hankins kick (Drive: 5 plays, 24 yards, 3:45; BU 7–0)

Second Quarter

- (4:01) BU – Drake Dabney 2 yard pass from Gerry Bohanon, Isaiah Hankins kick (Drive: 15 plays, 74 yards, 7:21; BU 14–0)
- (2:51) KSU – Deuce Vaughn 65 yard run, Chris Tennant kick (Drive: 4 plays, 75 yards, 1:10; BU 14–7)
- (0:00) BU – Isaiah Hankins 21 yard field goal (Drive: 13 plays, 71 yards, 2:51; BU 17–7)

Third Quarter

- (8:24) KSU – Chris Tennent 28 yard field goal (Drive: 9 plays, 43 yards, 3:14; BU 17–10)

Fourth Quarter

- (13:35) BU – Isaiah Hankins 28 yard field goal (Drive: 13 plays, 72 yards, 5:04; BU 20–10)

Statistics	BU	KSU
First downs	22	12
Total yards	387	263
Rushes/yards	48/174	21/105
Passing yards	213	158
Passing: Comp–Att–Int	25–35–0	15–30–1
Time of possession	35:54	24:06

Team	Category	Player	Statistics
Baylor	Passing	Blake Shapen	16–21, 137 yards
Baylor	Rushing	Trestan Ebner	12 carries, 68 yards, 1 TD
Baylor	Receiving	Tyquan Thornton	5 receptions, 75 yards
Kansas State	Passing	Skylar Thompson	15–29, 158 yards
Kansas State	Rushing	Deuce Vaughn	11 carries, 128 yards, 1 TD
Kansas State	Receiving	Malik Knowles	1 reception, 48 yards

=== Vs. Texas Tech ===
Uniform Combination
Helmet	Jersey	Pants

Texas Tech Red Raiders (6–5) vs. No. 8 Baylor Bears (9–2)

Quarter	1	2	3	4	Total
Texas Tech	3	7	0	14	24
No. 8 Baylor	10	7	0	10	27

at McLane Stadium • Waco, TX

- Date: Saturday, November 27, 2021
- Game time: 11:00 a.m. CST
- Game weather: cloudy • Temperature: 49°F
- Game attendance: 43,901
- Referee: Brandon Cruse
- TV announcers (FS1): Dan Hellie, Robert Smith

Game information

First Quarter

- (13:42) BU – Trestan Ebner 61 yard pass from Blake Shapen, Isaiah Hankins kick (Drive: 3 plays, 75 yards, 1:18; BU 7–0)
- (10:50) BU – Isaiah Hankins 28 yard field goal (Drive: 6 plays, 32 yards, 2:34; BU 10–0)
- (6:06) TTU – Jonathan Garibay 46 yard field goal (Drive: 9 plays, 47 yards, 4:44; BU 10–3)

Second Quarter

- (5:01) BU – Abram Smith 4 yard run, Isaiah Hankins kick (Drive: 5 plays, 24 yards, 2:17; BU 17–3)
- (1:08) TTU – Tahj Brooks 1 yard run, Jonathan Garibay kick (Drive: 9 plays, 75 yards, 3:53; BU 17–10)

Third Quarter

No scoring

Fourth Quarter

- (13:31) BU – Isaiah Hankins 27 yard field goal (Drive: 16 plays, 69 yards, 6:27; BU 20–10)
- (11:37) TTU – McLane Mannix 38 yard pass from Donovan Smith, Jonathan Garibay kick (Drive: 5 plays, 75 yards, 1:54; BU 20–17)
- (7:00) BU – Ben Sims 9 yard pass from Blake Shapen, Isaiah Hankins kick (Drive: 10 plays, 58 yards, 4:30; BU 27–17)
- (6:40) TTU – Travis Koontz 75 yard pass from Donovan Smith, Jonathan Garibay kick (Drive: 2 plays, 75 yards, 0:20; BU 27–24)

Statistics	TTU	BU
First downs	16	25
Total yards	386	434
Rushes/yards	28/124	50/180
Passing yards	262	254
Passing: Comp–Att–Int	15–24–0	20–34–0
Time of possession	22:34	37:26

Team	Category	Player	Statistics
Texas Tech	Passing	Donovan Smith	15–23, 262 yards, 2 TD
Texas Tech	Rushing	Tahj Brooks	14 carries, 40 yards, 1 TD
Texas Tech	Receiving	Travis Koontz	5 receptions, 117 yards, 1 TD
Baylor	Passing	Blake Shapen	20–34, 254 yards, 2 TD
Baylor	Rushing	Abram Smith	30 carries, 117 yards, 1 TD
Baylor	Receiving	Trestan Ebner	4 receptions, 118 yards, 1 TD

=== Vs. Oklahoma State (Big 12 Championship) ===
Uniform Combination
Helmet	Jersey	Pants

No. 9 Baylor Bears (10–2) vs. No. 5 Oklahoma State Cowboys (11–1)

Quarter	1	2	3	4	Total
No. 9 Baylor	7	14	0	0	21
No. 5 Oklahoma State	3	3	7	3	16

at AT&T Stadium • Arlington, TX

- Date: Saturday, December 4, 2021
- Game time: 11:00 a.m. CST
- Game weather: indoor
- Game attendance: 65,771
- Referee: Brandon Cruse
- TV announcers (ABC): Sean McDonough, Todd Blackledge, Molly McGrath

Game information

First Quarter

- (7:52) OKST – Tanner Brown 23 yard field goal (Drive: 14 plays, 68 yards, 4:22; OKST 3–0)
- (3:21) BU – Ben Sims 2 yard pass from Blake Shapen, Isaiah Hankins kick (Drive: 3 plays, 11 yards, 1:27; BU 7–3)

Second Quarter

- (14:54) BU – Drew Estrada 4 yard pass from Blake Shapen, Isaiah Hankins kick (Drive: 3 plays, 37 yards, 1:54; BU 14–3)
- (5:29) BU – Tyquan Thornton 13 yard pass from Blake Shapen, Isaiah Hankins kick (Drive: 9 plays, 47 yards, 4:09; BU 21–3)
- (3:34) OKST – Tanner Brown 23 yard field goal (Drive: 10 plays, 69 yards, 1:55; BU 21–6)

Third Quarter

- (7:09) OKST – Dominic Richardson 4 yard run, Tanner Brown kick (Drive: 8 plays, 36 yards, 3:20; BU 21–13)

Fourth Quarter

- (8:17) OKST – Tanner Brown 20 yard field goal (Drive: 10 plays, 27 yards, 4:30; BU 21–16)

Statistics	BU	OKST
First downs	15	26
Total yards	242	333
Rushes/yards	33/62	40/70
Passing yards	180	263
Passing: Comp–Att–Int	23–28–0	32–47–4
Time of possession	28:37	31:23

Team	Category	Player	Statistics
Baylor	Passing	Blake Shapen	23–28, 180 yards, 3 TD
Baylor	Rushing	Abram Smith	17 carries, 63 yards
Baylor	Receiving	Tyquan Thornton	6 receptions, 71 yards, 1 TD
Oklahoma State	Passing	Spencer Sanders	31–46, 257 yards, 4 INT
Oklahoma State	Rushing	Spencer Sanders	13 carries, 33 yards
Oklahoma State	Receiving	Tay Martin	9 receptions, 88 yards

=== Vs. Ole Miss (Sugar Bowl) ===
Uniform Combination
Helmet	Jersey	Pants

No. 7 Baylor Bears (11–2) vs. No. 8 Ole Miss Rebels (10–2)

Quarter	1	2	3	4	Total
No. 7 Baylor	0	7	0	14	21
No. 8 Ole Miss	0	0	7	0	7

at Caesars Superdome • New Orleans, Louisiana

- Date: Saturday, January 1, 2022
- Game time: 7:45 p.m. CST
- Game weather: indoor
- Game attendance: 66,479
- Referee: Ron Snodgrass
- TV announcers (ESPN): Joe Tessitore, Greg McElroy, Katie George

Game information

First Quarter

Second Quarter

- (10:16) BU – Al Walcott 96 yard interception, Isaiah Hankins kick (BU 7–0)

Third Quarter

- (9:13) MISS – Braylon Sanders 37 yard pass from Luke Altmyer, Cale Nation kick (Drive: 6 plays, 72 yards, 1:48; BU 7-7)

Fourth Quarter

- (11:14) BU – Monaray Baldwin run for 48 yards, Isaiah Hankins kick (Drive: 5 plays, 80 yards, 1:55; BU 14-7)
- (7:24) BU – Tyquan Thornton 2 yard pass from Gerry Bohanon, Isaiah Hankins kick (Drive: 5 plays, 15 yards, 2:34; BU 21-7)

Statistics	BU	MISS
First downs	12	20
Total yards	319	322
Rushes/yards	279	138
Passing yards	40	184
Passing: Comp–Att–Int	7-17-1	17-34-3
Time of possession	28:24	31:36

Team	Category	Player	Statistics
Baylor	Passing	Gerry Bohanon	7–17, 40 yards, 1 TD, 1 INT
Baylor	Rushing	Abram Smith	25 carries, 172 yards
Baylor	Receiving	Drew Estrada	2 receptions, 14 yards
Ole Miss	Passing	Luke Altmyer	15–28, 174 yards, 1 TD, 2 INT
Ole Miss	Rushing	Jerrion Ealy	12 carries, 65 yards
Ole Miss	Receiving	Dontario Drummond	9 receptions, 104 yards

== Rankings ==
Ranking movements Legend: ██ Increase in ranking ██ Decrease in ranking — = Not ranked RV = Received votes
	Week															
Poll	Pre	1	2	3	4	5	6	7	8	9	10	11	12	13	14	Final
AP	—	—	—	—	21	RV	RV	20	16	14	18	11	9	9	6	5
Coaches	—	—	—	RV	24	RV	RV	20	18	13	18	13	10	9	6	6
CFP	Not released									12	13	11	8	9	7	Not released
