= 2021 Big 12 Championship Game =

2021 Dr Pepper Big 12 Championship Game
- 20th Big 12 Conference Championship
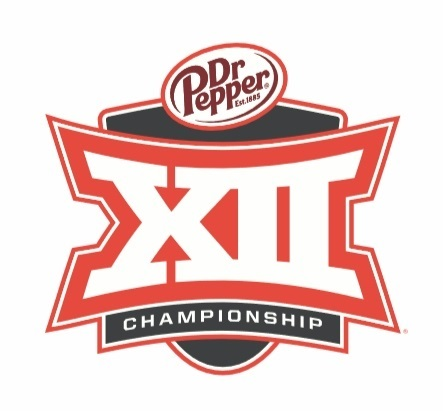
Baylor Bears	Oklahoma State Cowboys
(10–2)	(11–1)
21	16
Head coach: Dave Aranda	Head coach: Mike Gundy
AP / Coaches / CFP; 9 / 9 / 9	AP / Coaches / CFP; 5 / 5 / 5
	1	2	3	4	Total
Baylor	7	14	0	0	21
Oklahoma State	3	3	7	3	16
- Date: December 4, 2021
- Season: 2021
- Stadium: AT&T Stadium
- Location: Arlington, Texas
- MVP: Blake Shapen (QB, Baylor)
- Favorite: Oklahoma State by 6
- Referee: Brandon Cruse
- Attendance: 65,771

United States TV coverage
- Network: ABC; ESPN Radio
- Announcers: ABC: Sean McDonough (play-by-play), Todd Blackledge (analyst), and Molly McGrath (sideline); ESPN Radio: Sean Kelley (play-by-play), Barrett Jones (analyst) and Ian Fitzsimmons (sideline)

International TV coverage
- Network: ESPN Brazil
- Announcers: Matheus Pinheiro (play-by-play), Weinny Eirado (analyst)

2021 Big 12 Conference football standings
	Conf.			Overall
Team	W		L	W		L
No. 7 Oklahoma State y	8	–	1	12	–	2
No. 5 Baylor y$	7	–	2	12	–	2
No. 10 Oklahoma	7	–	2	11	–	2
Iowa State	5	–	4	7	–	6
Kansas State	4	–	5	8	–	5
West Virginia	4	–	5	6	–	7
Texas	3	–	6	5	–	7
TCU	3	–	6	5	–	7
Texas Tech	3	–	6	7	–	6
Kansas	1	–	8	2	–	10
Championship: Baylor 21, Oklahoma State 16
$ – Conference champion; y – Championship game participant; Rankings from AP Poll

The 2021 Big 12 Championship Game was a college football game played on December 4, 2021, at AT&T Stadium in Arlington, Texas. It was the 20th edition of the Big 12 Championship Game, and determined the champion of the Big 12 Conference for the 2021 season. The game began at 11:00 a.m. CST and aired on ABC. The game featured the conference's regular season champions, the Oklahoma State Cowboys, and the runners-up, the Baylor Bears. Sponsored by soft drink company Keurig Dr Pepper through its flagship Dr Pepper brand, the game was officially known as the Dr Pepper Big 12 Championship Game.

== Previous season ==
The Oklahoma Sooners defeated the Iowa State Cyclones 27-21 in 2020, winning their sixth consecutive Big 12 Championship Game. This marked Iowa State’s first ever appearance in a Big 12 Championship Game.

== Teams ==
The 2021 Big 12 Championship Game featured the two teams with the best conference records; Oklahoma State and Baylor. This was the 41st meeting between the teams; Oklahoma State entered leading the all-time series 22–18. The teams first met in 1914, and have played annually since Baylor joined the new Big 12 in 1996. This was their second postseason meeting, after the teams faced off in the 1983 Astro-Bluebonnet Bowl, resulting in a ten-point Oklahoma State victory.

This was Baylor's second appearance in the Big 12 Championship, following a loss in their first appearance in 2019. Oklahoma State made their first-ever appearance, though the Cowboys won the Big 12 championship in its previous format in 2011. The game was the first Big 12 title game without Oklahoma since 2009; they had appeared in, and won, the last five consecutive championship games, though the Big 12 did not hold a championship game from 2011 to 2016. Further, this was the first title game without either Oklahoma or Texas since 1998. This was the first Big 12 title game without the Sooners under the Championship Game’s new format.

=== Oklahoma State ===
Led by head coach Mike Gundy in his 17th season, Oklahoma State entered the season with a narrow defeat of FCS-ranked Missouri State. They followed up with another narrow comeback win against Tulsa after scoring three touchdowns in the fourth quarter alone, and then took to the road for their first away game against Boise State, which resulted in a one-point win for the Cowboys. They faced their first conference opponent the following week, No. 25 Kansas State, and the Cowboys pulled the upset to move to 4–0 and jump into the rankings at No. 19. Oklahoma State then faced No. 21 Baylor, whom they defeated by ten points, which led into a bye week. The Cowboys then travelled to No. 25 Texas, overcoming an early deficit to win by eight and vault themselves into the top ten, at No. 8. Another road game saw Oklahoma State drop their first game of the year, as they lost to Iowa State by three points. The Cowboys rebounded with a dominant win over Kansas, and held West Virginia to a field goal the following week in a three-touchdown win. They continued on their win streak with another dominant win, this time over TCU, and followed with a shutout win in their final away game of the season against Texas Tech; this victory clinched them a spot in the championship game. They finished their season with a four-point home win against No. 10 Oklahoma, their first win in the rivalry series since an overtime victory in 2014. The Cowboys, ranked No. 5, also had a potential College Football Playoff spot on the line, where they needed a win in the Big 12 Championship coupled with either an Alabama loss in the SEC Championship, a Michigan loss in the Big Ten Championship, or a Cincinnati loss in the AAC Championship to get into the Top 4. However, given the CFP Committee's alleged bias against Group of 5 teams, it is possible that a 12-1 Oklahoma State would have jumped a 13-0 Cincinnati for the 4th Playoff spot.

=== Baylor ===
In their second season under head coach Dave Aranda, the Bears entered 2021 looking to respond from a disappointing 2–7 campaign the year prior. They began the season with a road win against Texas State, and won their home opener in dominant fashion against Texas Southern. They opened conference play in the season's third week, as they took down Kansas on the road by 38 points, and the Bears returned home to finish September with an upset victory against the No. 14 Iowa State Cyclones, whom they defeated by two points. The Bears suffered their season's first loss the following week, when they fell to No. 19 Oklahoma State in Stillwater by ten points. Baylor finished the month strong, however; in three consecutive home games, the Bears defeated West Virginia by 25 points before defeating No. 19 BYU in their third and final non-conference game, which also marked Baylor's homecoming. Now ranked No. 16, the Bears defeated Texas by a touchdown to improve their record to 7–1. The following week, Baylor fell to TCU by two points, marking their second loss on the season, though they were able to respond with a two-possession upset victory over No. 8 Oklahoma. In their final away game, the Bears defeated Kansas State by ten, which put them in the top ten in the rankings for the first time in the season. Their home finale saw the Bears narrowly escape an upset bid from Texas Tech in a three-point win to finish the regular season 10–2. After that, they only needed an Oklahoma State win in the Bedlam rivalry game to go to the Big 12 Championship. By virtue of Oklahoma State's win over Oklahoma on November 27, Baylor finished the regular season tied with Oklahoma in the Big 12 standings, and, due to their head-to-head victory over Oklahoma, advanced to the title game over the Sooners.

== Game summary ==
2021 Dr Pepper Big 12 Championship Game

Quarter	1	2	3	4	Total
No. 9 Baylor	7	14	0	0	21
No. 5 Oklahoma State	3	3	7	3	16

at AT&T Stadium • Arlington, Texas

- Date: December 4, 2021
- Game time: 11:00 a.m. CST
- Game weather: None (retractable roof closed)
- Game attendance: 65,771
- Referee: Brandon Cruse
- TV announcers (ABC): Sean McDonough (play-by-play), Todd Blackledge (analyst), and Molly McGrath (sideline)
- Box score

Scoring summary

Quarter	Time	Drive			Team	Scoring information	Score	
Quarter	Time	Plays	Yards	TOP	Team	Scoring information	Baylor	Oklahoma State
1	7:52	14	68	4:22	Oklahoma State	23-yard field goal by Tanner Brown	0	3
1	3:21	3	11	1:27	Baylor	Ben Sims 2-yard touchdown reception from Blake Shapen, Isaiah Hankins kick good	7	3
2	14:54	3	37	1:54	Baylor	Drew Estrada 4-yard touchdown reception from Blake Shapen, Isaiah Hankins kick good	14	3
2	5:29	9	47	4:09	Baylor	Tyquan Thornton 13-yard touchdown reception from Blake Shapen, Isaiah Hankins kick good	21	3
2	3:34	10	69	1:55	Oklahoma State	23-yard field goal by Tanner Brown	21	6
3	7:09	8	36	3:20	Oklahoma State	Dominic Richardson 4-yard touchdown run, Tanner Brown kick good	21	13
4	8:17	10	27	4:30	Oklahoma State	20-yard field goal by Tanner Brown	21	16
"TOP" = time of possession. For other American football terms, see Glossary of American football.							21	16

=== Summary ===
The ending of the game was particularly notable as a result of a goal-line stand from the Baylor defense. Facing 1st and goal from the Baylor 1 yard line, the Bears defense repeatedly denied the Cowboys, as they had done previously in the game, culminating with a mad dash towards the pylon on 4th and goal, where the Cowboy running back was ruled inches short of a touchdown and potentially a Big 12 title. Baylor’s victory marked their first Big 12 Championship since 2014, their first unshared Big 12 title since 2013, their first win in a Big 12 Championship Game, and their third overall.

== Statistics ==
=== Team statistics ===
Team statistical comparison
Statistic	Baylor	Oklahoma State
First downs	15	26
First downs rushing	7	8
First downs passing	7	14
First downs penalty	1	4
Third down efficiency	6 of 14	12 of 20
Fourth down efficiency	0 of 1	0 of 1
Total plays–net yards	61–242	87–333
Rushing attempts–net yards	33–62	40–70
Yards per rush	1.9	1.8
Yards passing	180	263
Pass completions–attempts	23–28	32–47
Interceptions thrown	0	4
Punt returns–total yards	1–5	0–0
Kickoff returns–total yards	2–40	0–0
Punts–total yardage	5–263	4–180
Fumbles–lost	3–2	2–0
Penalties–yards	7–49	6–50
Time of possession	28:37	31:23

=== Individual statistics ===
Baylor statistics
Bears passing
	C–A	Yds	TD	INT
Blake Shapen	23–28	180	3	0
Bears rushing
	Car	Yds	TD	Avg
Abram Smith	17	63	0	3.7
Bears receiving
	Rec	Yds	TD	Avg
Tyquan Thornton	6	71	1	11.8

Oklahoma State statistics
Cowboys passing
	C–A	Yds	TD	INT
Spencer Sanders	31–46	257	0	4
Cowboys rushing
	Car	Yds	TD	Avg
Spencer Sanders	13	33	0	2.5
Cowboys receiving
	Rec	Yds	TD	Avg
Tay Martin	9	88	0	9.8

== See also ==
- List of Big 12 Conference football champions
