= Gerry Bohanon =

American football player (born 1999)

No. 3
- Position: Quarterback

Personal information
- Born: November 26, 1999 (age 26); Earle, Arkansas, U.S.
- Listed height: 6 ft 2 in (1.88 m)
- Listed weight: 225 lb (102 kg)

Career information
- High school: Earle
- College: Baylor (2018–2021); South Florida (2022–2023); BYU (2024)

Awards and highlights
- Davey O’Brien Award’s Quarterback Class of 2021
- Stats at ESPN

Gerry Bohanon (born November 26, 1999) is an American former football quarterback. Bohanan played college football for the Baylor Bears, South Florida Bulls and the BYU Cougars between 2018 and 2024.

== Early life ==
Bohanon attended Earle High School in Earle, Arkansas. As a senior in 2017, he passed for 2,675 yards and 34 touchdowns, along with an additional 1,200 rushing yards and 17 rushing touchdowns. In 2017, he was named to the Elite 11 finals. A four-star recruit, Bohanon committed to play college football at Baylor University.

== College career ==
Bohanon served as a backup quarterback in his true freshman, redshirt freshman, and sophomore seasons, primarily to Charlie Brewer. Bohanon became the starting quarterback for the 2021 season, his junior season, leading the Bears to an 9–2 start, including three ranked wins, before a hamstring injury in November kept him out of the team's remaining games for the season. In his first six games, he threw zero interceptions. He led the Bears to a 21–7 Sugar Bowl win over Ole Miss. As starter, Bohanon led Baylor to 12–2 record, the most wins in a single season in the school's history. The Bears finished the season in the Top-10 in the AP Poll.

On May 8, 2022, he announced his transfer to USF. On November 28, 2023, Bohanon entered the transfer portal for a second time where he committed to Brigham Young University on January 4, 2024.

On January 21, 2025, Bohanon declared himself for the 2025 NFL draft. He was not selected.

=== College statistics ===
Season	Team	GP	Passing							Rushing			
Season	Team	GP	Att	Comp	Pct	Yards	TD	Int	Rtg	Att	Yds	Avg	TD
2018	Baylor	3	1	0	0.0	0	0	0	0.0	2	5	2.5	0
2019	Baylor	10	36	17	47.2	187	2	0	109.2	42	272	6.5	3
2020	Baylor	2	1	1	100.0	7	0	0	158.8	4	19	4.8	0
2021	Baylor	12	275	173	62.9	2,200	18	7	146.6	76	323	4.3	9
2022	South Florida	7	160	91	56.9	1,070	6	6	117.9	60	386	6.4	3
2023	South Florida	0	Did not play										
2024	BYU	1	0	0	0.0	0	0	0	0.0	0	0	0.0	0
Career		34	473	282	59.6	3,464	26	13	133.8	184	1,005	5.5	15

== Professional career ==
Pre-draft measurables
Height	Weight	Arm length	Hand span
6 ft 1 3/4 in (1.87 m)	225 lb (102 kg)	32 in (0.81 m)	10 1/2 in (0.27 m)
All values from Pro Day
