= 2024 Baylor Bears football team =

American college football season

2024 Baylor Bears football

Texas Bowl, L 31–44 vs. LSU
- Conference: Big 12 Conference
- Record: 8–5 (6–3 Big 12)
- Head coach: Dave Aranda (5th season)
- Offensive coordinator: Jake Spavital (1st season)
- Offensive scheme: Bear raid
- Defensive coordinator: Matt Powledge (2nd season)
- Base defense: 3–4
- Home stadium: McLane Stadium

Uniform
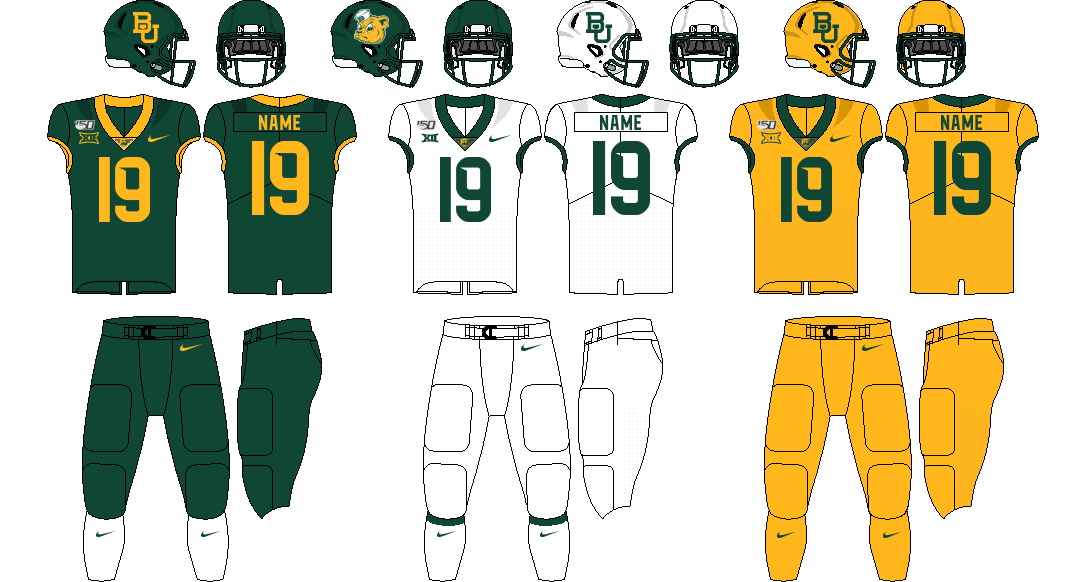

2024 Big 12 Conference football standings
	Conf.			Overall
Team	W		L	W		L
No. 7 Arizona State y$^	7	–	2	11	–	3
No. 15 Iowa State y	7	–	2	11	–	3
No. 13 BYU	7	–	2	11	–	2
No. 25 Colorado	7	–	2	9	–	4
Baylor	6	–	3	8	–	5
TCU	6	–	3	9	–	4
Texas Tech	6	–	3	8	–	5
Kansas State	5	–	4	9	–	4
West Virginia	5	–	4	6	–	7
Kansas	4	–	5	5	–	7
Cincinnati	3	–	6	5	–	7
Houston	3	–	6	4	–	8
Utah	2	–	7	5	–	7
UCF	2	–	7	4	–	8
Arizona	2	–	7	4	–	8
Oklahoma State	0	–	9	3	–	9
Championship: Arizona State 45, Iowa State 19
^ – College Football Playoff participant; $ – Conference champion; y – Championship game participant; Rankings from AP Poll

The 2024 Baylor Bears football team represented Baylor University as a member of the Big 12 Conference during the 2024 NCAA Division I FBS football season. They were led by Dave Aranda in his fifth year as their head coach. The Bears played their home games at McLane Stadium located in Waco, Texas.

== Offseason ==
Positions key
Offense	Defense	Special teams
QB — Quarterback; RB — Running back; FB — Fullback; WR — Wide receiver; TE — Tight end; OL — Offensive lineman; T — Tackle; G — Guard; C — Center	DL — Defensive lineman; DT — Defensive tackle (Note: Includes nose tackle (NT)); DE — Defensive end; EDGE — Edge rusher; LB — Linebacker (Note: Includes middle linebacker (MLB/MIKE), weakside linebacker (WILL), strongside linebacker (SAM), off-ball linebacker, and outside linebacker (OLB)); DB — Defensive back; CB — Cornerback; S — Safety (Note: Includes free safety (FS) and strong safety (SS))	K — Kicker (Note: Also known as a placekicker (PK)); P — Punter; LS — Long snapper; RS — Return specialist (Note: Includes kickoff and punt returners)

=== Coaching staff changes ===
Name	Position	Reason	Replacement
AJ Steward	Assistant Head Coach (Running Backs)	Not Retained - Accepted Job with Kansas Jayhawks	Khenon Hall
Jeff Grimes	Offenive Coordinator (Tight Ends)	Not Retained - Accepted Job with Kansas Jayhawks	Jake Spavital, Jarrett Anderson
Shawn Bell	Assistant Coach (Quarterbacks)	Accepted job with Houston Cougars	Jake Spavital
Dennis Johnson	Assistant Coach (Defensive Line)	Accepted job with Baltimore Ravens	Inoke Breckterfield
Eric Mateos	Assistant Coach (Offensive Line)	Accepted job with Arkansas Razorbacks	Mason Miller
Christian Robinson	Assistant Coach (Inside Linebackers	Accepted job with Alabama Crimson Tide	Jamar Chaney

=== Transfers ===
Departing

Name	Pos.	Height	Weight	New school
Blake Shapen	QB	6'0"	206	Mississippi State
R.J. Martinez	QB	5'11"	216	Texas State
Qualan Jones	RB	5'10"	242	Stephen F. Austin
Drake Dabney	TE	6'5"	248	TCU
Jake Roberts	TE	6'5"	248	Oklahoma
Armani Winfield	WR	6'2"	205	Colorado State
Jordan Nabors	WR	5'11"	190	Stephen F. Austin
Javin Gibpson	WR	6'3"	208	Abilene Christian
George Maile	IOL	6'3"	305	Utah State
Elijah Ellis	OT	6'6"	307	Marshall
Bryce Simpson	IOL	6'5"	304	Butler Community College (JUCO)
Tim Dawn	IOL	6'2"	315	Arkansas
Tony Anwaywu	EDGE	6'2"	249	Stephen F. Austin
Hakeem Vance	LB	6'1"	215	--
Alfonzo Allen	S	5'11"	194	Florida

Incoming

Name	Pos.	Height	Weight	Hometown	Prev. school
Colton Thomasson	OT	6'8	320	Spring Branch, TX	Texas A&M
Sidney Fugar	OT	6'5	325	Oakdale, CT	South Carolina
Lorando Johnson	CB	6'0	195	Lancaster, TX	Arkansas
Elinus Noel III	DL	6'2	330	New Orleans, LA	Texas Southern
Colin Truett	IOL	6'3	287	Lebanon, OH	Chattanooga
JaQues Evans	EDGE	6'2	250	Dublin, GA	Western Kentucky
Steve Linton	EDGE	6'5	235	Dublin, GA	Texas Tech
Jamaal Bell	WR	5'10	171	Lancaster, CA	Nevada
Michael Trigg	TE	6'3	240	Tampa, FL	Ole Miss
Kurt Danneker (Note: Injured ACL before season; retired from football before playing a game)	IOL	6'4	332	Williamsport, PA	Ohio
Kendrick Simpkins	S	6'0	196	Montgomery, AL	Western Kentucky
Ashtyn Hawkins	WR	5'10	170	DeSoto, TX	Texas State
Cameren Jenkins	S	6'1	185	Lewisville, TX	UNLV
RaRa Dillworth	LB	6'2	195	Kernersville, NC	East Carolina
Omar Aigbedion	IOL	6'8	308	Katy, TX	Montana State
Dequan Finn	QB	6'2	205	Detroit, MI	Toledo

=== Recruiting ===
College recruiting
Name	Hometown	School	Height	Weight	Commit date
Alex Foster; Defensive Line	Greenville, MS	St. Joseph Catholic School	6 ft 5 in (1.96 m)	292 lb (132 kg)	Jul 4, 2023
Alex Foster; Defensive Line	Recruit ratings: Rivals: 247Sports: ESPN:				
Joshua Lair; Safety	Missouri City, TX	Thurgood Marshall High School	6 ft 1 in (1.85 m)	185 lb (84 kg)	Feb 7, 2024
Joshua Lair; Safety	Recruit ratings: Rivals: 247Sports: ESPN:				
Joseph Dodds; Running Back	El Maton, TX	Tidehaven Junior/Senior High	5 ft 11.5 in (1.82 m)	205 lb (93 kg)	Jun 21, 2023
Joseph Dodds; Running Back	Recruit ratings: Rivals: 247Sports: ESPN:				
Tonga Lolohea; Defensive Line	Tyler, TX	Tyler Junior College	6 ft 5 in (1.96 m)	310 lb (140 kg)	Dec 18, 2023
Tonga Lolohea; Defensive Line	Recruit ratings: Rivals: 247Sports: ESPN:				
Jadon Porter; Wide Receiver	Lorena, TX	Lorena High School	6 ft 1 in (1.85 m)	196 lb (89 kg)	Apr 23, 2022
Jadon Porter; Wide Receiver	Recruit ratings: Rivals: 247Sports: ESPN:				
Kris Wokomah; Safety	Arlington, TX	Bowie High School	6 ft 0 in (1.83 m)	193 lb (88 kg)	Jun 14, 2023
Kris Wokomah; Safety	Recruit ratings: Rivals: 247Sports: ESPN:				
Brock Jackson; EDGE	Lumberton, TX	Lumberton High School	6 ft 3 in (1.91 m)	245 lb (111 kg)	Feb 9, 2023
Brock Jackson; EDGE	Recruit ratings: Rivals: 247Sports: ESPN:				
Kyland Reed; Linebacker	Arlington, TX	Mansfield Summit High School	6 ft 2 in (1.88 m)	210 lb (95 kg)	Jun 27, 2023
Kyland Reed; Linebacker	Recruit ratings: Rivals: 247Sports: ESPN:				
Mason Dossett; Safety	Missouri City, TX	Ridge Point High School	6 ft 0 in (1.83 m)	180 lb (82 kg)	Jun 9, 2023
Mason Dossett; Safety	Recruit ratings: Rivals: 247Sports: ESPN:				
Tristan Santoro; Offensive Tackle	Shreveport, LA	Evangelical Christian Academy	6 ft 6 in (1.98 m)	271 lb (123 kg)	Jun 25, 2023
Tristan Santoro; Offensive Tackle	Recruit ratings: Rivals: 247Sports: ESPN:				
Kyler Beaty; Cornerback	Comanche, TX	Comanche High School	6 ft 0 in (1.83 m)	170 lb (77 kg)	Aug 5, 2023
Kyler Beaty; Cornerback	Recruit ratings: Rivals: 247Sports: ESPN:				
Keaton Thomas; Linebacker	Jacksonville, FL	Northeast Mississippi Community College	6 ft 2 in (1.88 m)	230 lb (100 kg)	Dec 10, 2023
Keaton Thomas; Linebacker	Recruit ratings: Rivals: 247Sports: ESPN:				
Koltin Sieracki; Interior Offensive Line	The Woodlands, TX	The Woodlands High School	6 ft 3 in (1.91 m)	300 lb (140 kg)	Jan 31, 2023
Koltin Sieracki; Interior Offensive Line	Recruit ratings: Rivals: 247Sports: ESPN:				
Nate Bennett; Quarterback	Westlake Village, CA	Oaks Christian High School	6 ft 1 in (1.85 m)	160 lb (73 kg)	May 18, 2023
Nate Bennett; Quarterback	Recruit ratings: Rivals: 247Sports: ESPN:				
Ka'Marii Landers; Interior Offensive Line	Dearborn, MI	Copiah-Lincoln Community College	6 ft 5 in (1.96 m)	300 lb (140 kg)	Jul 31, 2024
Ka'Marii Landers; Interior Offensive Line	Recruit ratings: Rivals: 247Sports: ESPN:				
Connor Hawkins; Kicker	Liberty Hill, TX	Liberty Hill High School	6 ft 1 in (1.85 m)	185 lb (84 kg)	Aug 4, 2023
Connor Hawkins; Kicker	Recruit ratings: Rivals: 247Sports: ESPN:				

== Preseason ==
=== Big 12 media poll ===
The Big 12 media poll was released on July 2. The Bears were predicted to finish 12th in the conference.

== Coaching staff ==
The Bears are coached by Dave Aranda, his fifth year in the program. Notable new additions to the staff included Khenon Hall, Associate Head Coach and Running Backs Coach, Jake Spavital, Offensive Coordinator and Mark Scott, Special Teams Quality Control Coach.

Name	Position	Seasons at Baylor
Dave Aranda	Head coach	5th
Khenon Hall	Associate head coach and running backs coach	1st
Jake Spavital	Offensive coordinator	1st
Matt Powledge	Defensive coordinator	3rd
Jarrett Anderson	Tight ends coach	1st
Dallas Baker	Wide receivers coach	3rd
Inoke Breckterfield	Defensive line coach	1st
Jamar Chaney	Inside linebackers coach	1st
Caleb Collins	Outside linebackers coach	4th
Kevin Curtis	Cornerbacks coach	3rd
Mason Miller	Offensive line coach	1st
Jeff Grigus	Chief of staff	3rd
Mark Scott	Special teams quality control coach	1st

== Schedule ==
Date	Time	Opponent	Site	TV	Result	Attendance
August 31	6:00 p.m.	No. 21 (FCS) Tarleton State*	McLane Stadium; Waco, TX	ESPN+	W 45–3	42,272
September 7	2:30 p.m.	at No. 11 Utah (Note: Although both Baylor and Utah were 2024 members of the Big 12, this game did not count in conference standings due to the game being scheduled before Utah joined the Big 12.)*	Rice–Eccles Stadium; Salt Lake City, UT	FOX	L 12–23	52,827
September 14	6:30 p.m.	Air Force*	McLane Stadium; Waco, TX	FS1	W 31–3	46,212
September 21	7:00 p.m.	at Colorado	Folsom Field; Boulder, CO	FOX	L 31–38 ^{OT}	52,794
September 28	11:00 a.m.	No. 22 BYU	McLane Stadium; Waco, TX	FS1	L 28–34	39,583
October 5	6:30 p.m.	at No. 16 Iowa State	Jack Trice Stadium; Ames, IA	FOX	L 21–43	61,500
October 19	3:00 p.m.	at Texas Tech	Jones AT&T Stadium; Lubbock, TX (rivalry)	ESPN2	W 59–35	60,229
October 26	2:30 p.m.	Oklahoma State^{†}	McLane Stadium; Waco, TX	ESPN+	W 38–28	44,987
November 2	7:00 p.m.	TCU	McLane Stadium; Waco, TX (rivalry)	ESPN2	W 37–34	44,171
November 16	3:00 p.m.	at West Virginia	Milan Puskar Stadium; Morgantown, WV	ESPN2	W 49–35	52,376
November 23	6:00 p.m.	at Houston	TDECU Stadium; Houston, TX (rivalry)	FS1	W 20–10	34,166
November 30	11:00 a.m.	Kansas	McLane Stadium; Waco, TX	ESPN2	W 45–17	36,585
December 31	2:30 p.m.	vs. LSU*	NRG Stadium; Houston, TX (Texas Bowl)	ESPN	L 31–44	59,940
*Non-conference game; ^{†}Homecoming; Rankings from AP Poll (and CFP Rankings, after October 30) - Released prior to game; All times are in Central time

== Personnel ==
2024 Baylor Bears football team roster
Players
Coaches
Offense

Pos.	#	Name	Class
TE	1	Michael Trigg	Jr
WR	4	Monaray Baldwin	Sr
WR	6	Ashtyn Hawkins	GS
QB	7	Dequan Finn	GS
WR	11	Ketron Jackson Jr.	Sr
TE	12	Kelsey Johnson	Jr
QB	13	Sawyer Robertson	Jr
QB	14	Nate Bennett	Fr
WR	16	Hal Presley	Sr
WR	17	Jonah Burton	Jr
QB	17	Cade Tessier	Fr
QB	18	Brayson McHenry	So
RB	20	Jamaal Bell	GS
WR	22	Isaiah Davis	GS
RB	27	Joseph Dodds	Fr
RB	29	Richard Reese	Jr
RB	30	Bryson Washington	Fr
WR	34	Josh Cameron	Jr
RB	35	Dawson Pendergrass	So
RB	37	Joseph Hagman	So
TE	43	Gavin Yates	Sr
OL	53	Campbell Barrington	Sr
OL	57	Wes Tucker	Fr
OL	58	Gavin Byers	GS
OL	61	Cayden Tone	Fr
OL	62	Ryan Lengyel	Jr
OL	63	Wyatt Swaner	Fr
OL	64	Ka'Marii Landers	So
OL	65	Sean Thomkins	Fr
OL	66	Koltin Sieraki	Fr
OL	68	Omar Aigbedion	Jr
OL	69	Sidney Fugar	Jr
OL	72	Coleton Price	So
OL	73	Colin Truett	GS
OL	74	Kaden Sieracki	So
OL	76	Isaiah Robinson	Fr
OL	77	Colton Thomasson	Fr
OL	79	Alvin Ebosele	So
WR	80	Jackson Baird	Fr
WR	81	Seth Weller	Jr
TE	82	Cody Mladenka	So
WR	83	Jadon Porter	Fr
WR	84	Cameron Bonner	Jr
TE	85	Matthew Klopfenstein	So
TE	86	Hawkins Polley	Fr
WR	88	Micah Gifford	So
WR	89	Daniel Edeni	Fr

Defense

Pos.	#	Name	Class
DL	0	Jackie Marshall	Jr
LB	2	Matt Jones	GS
S	3	Devyn Bobby	Jr
OLB	5	Garmon Randolph	GS
CB	8	Caden Jenkins	So
DL	9	Treven Ma'ae	Sr
OLB	10	Steve Linton	GS
LB	11	Keaton Thomas	So
CB	12	Kyler Beaty	Fr
CB	13	Isaiah Dunson	Jr
S	14	Josh Lair	Fr
S	14	Carl Williams IV	So
S	16	Kendrick Simpkins	GS
CB	18	Lorando Johnson	Sr
S	20	Devin Lemear	Jr
CB	21	Chateau Reed	Sr
CB	22	Reggie Bush II	So
S	23	Cameren Jenkins	So
S	24	Corey Gordon Jr.	So
CB	25	Levar Thornton Jr.	Fr
CB	26	Christian Cunningham	Fr
CB	27	Tevin Williams	Jr
S	29	Kris Wokomah	Fr
S	30	Michael Allen	So
S	31	Mason Dossett	Fr
LB	32	Carmello Jones	So
S	33	DJ Coleman	So
CB	34	MJ Artmore Jr	Fr
S	36	Rara Dillworth	Sr
CB	37	Tay'Shawn Wilson	Fr
S	38	Jacob Redding	Fr
S	39	Michael Mastrodicasa	Jr
OLB	40	Kyler Jordan	So
LB	41	Brooks Miller	Sr
LB	42	Jeremy Evans	So
LB	44	Josh White	Sr
LB	45	Kyland Reed	Fr
OLB	46	JaQues Evans	GS
S	47	Caleb Parker	Sr
LB	49	Trey Laurance	Fr
DL	50	Kaian Roberts-Day	So
OLB	52	Corey Kelly	Fr
DL	53	Ronnie Mageo	So
DL	54	David Marshall Jr.	Sr
OLB	56	Brock Jackson	Fr
OLB	57	Prince Ugoh	Jr
LB	58	Jaden Maronen	Jr
DL	59	Devonte Tezino	So
DL	90	Brendan Bett	So
DL	91	Trey Wilson	So
DL	92	Trent Thomas	Fr
DL	93	DJ Kalu	Fr
DL	94	Caden Boenig	Fr
DL	95	Alex Foster	Fr
DL	96	Tonga Lolohea	Jr
DL	97	Cooper Lanz	Jr
DL	98	Elinus Noel III	Sr
DL	99	Caleb James	Sr

Special teams

Pos.	#	Name	Class
LS	26	Garrison Grimes	Jr
LS	93	Dylan Schaub	So
P	94	Palmer Williams	So
K	96	Connor Hawkins	Fr
K	97	Hayden Arnold	Fr
K	98	Isaiah Hankins	Jr
K	99	Jack Stone	Jr

Head coach

- Dave Aranda

Coordinators/assistant coaches

- Khenon Hall
  Associate Head Coach and Running Backs Coach
- Jake Spavital
  Offensive Coordinator
- Matt Powledge
  Defensive Coordinator
- Jarrett Anderson
  Tight Ends
- Dallas Baker
  Wide Receivers
- Inoke Breckterfield
  Defensive Line
- Jamar Chaney
  Inside Linebackers
- Caleb Collins
  Outside Linebackers
- Kevin Curtis
  Cornerbacks
- Mason Miller
  Offensive Line
- Jeff Grigus
  Chief of Staff

Legend

- (C) Team captain
- (S) Suspended
- (I) Ineligible
- Injured
- Redshirt

Roster

== Game summaries ==
=== vs. No. 21 (FCS) Tarleton State ===
Game One – No. 21 (FCS) Tarleton State Texans (1–0) vs Baylor Bears (0–0) – Game summary

Quarter	1	2	3	4	Total
No. 21 (FCS) Texans	0	0	3	0	3
Bears	21	7	7	10	45

at McLane Stadium • Waco, TX

- Date: Saturday August 31, 2024
- Game time: 6:00 PM CST
- Game weather: Sunny, 89 °F (32 °C)
- Game attendance: 42,272
- Referee: Cravonne Barrett
- TV announcers (ESPN+): Pete Souza (play-by-play) and Brad Hopkins (analyst)
- Box Score Recap

Game information

First quarter

- (13:37) BAY - Dequan Finn 39-yard rush (Isaiah Hankins kick) Drive: 5 Plays, 66 Yards, 1:23. Bears 7-0
- (4:52) BAY - Ashtyn Hawkins 32-yard reception from Dequan Finn (Isaiah Hankins Kick) Drive: 5 Plays, 46 Yards, 2:09 Bears 14-0
- (4:12) BAY - Keaton Thomas 35-yard interception return (Isaiah Hankins kick) Bears 21-0

Second quarter

- (9:59) BAY - Dawson Pendergrass 1-yard rush (Isaiah Hankins kick) Drive: 9 Plays, 66 Yards, 2:50 Bears 28-0

Third quarter

- (11:23) TAR - Adrian Guzman 34-yard Field Goal Drive: 8 Plays, 58 Yards, 2:24 Bears 28-3
- (8:11) BAY - Michael Trigg 19-yard reception from Dequan Finn (Isaiah Hankins kick) Drive: 7 Plays, 63 Yards, 3:08 Bears 35-3

Fourth quarter

- (9:37) BAY - Isaiah Hankins 39-yard Field Goal Drive: 8 Plays, 22 Yards, 2:40 Bears 38-3
- (3:51) BAY - Ketron Jackson Jr. 30-yard reception from Sawyer Robertson Drive: 9 Plays, 83 Yards, 3:13 Bears 45-3

Statistics	TAR	BAY
First downs	9	24
Total yards	181	442
Rushing yards	101	164
Passing yards	80	278
Passing: Comp–Att–Int	7-15-1	18-28-2
Time of possession	31:20	28:40

Team	Category	Player	Statistics
Tarleton State	Passing	Daniel Greek	7/13, 80 Yards
Tarleton State	Rushing	Kayvon Britten	13 Carries, 68 Yards
Tarleton State	Receiving	Darius Cooper	2 Receptions, 44 Yards
Baylor	Passing	Dequan Finn	14/22, 192 Yards, 2 TD
Baylor	Rushing	Richard Reese	18 Carries, 78 Yards
Baylor	Receiving	Ketron Jackson Jr.	2 Receptions, 69 Yards, TD

=== at No. 11 Utah ===
Game Two – Baylor Bears (1–0) at No. 11 Utah Utes (1–0) – Game summary

Quarter	1	2	3	4	Total
Bears	0	3	9	0	12
No. 11 Utes	17	6	0	0	23

at Rice-Eccles Stadium • Salt Lake City, UT

- Date: September 7, 2024
- Game time: 2:30 p.m. CST
- Game weather: 89 °F (32 °C)
- Game attendance: 52,827
- Referee: Tutashinda Salaam
- TV announcers (FOX): Jason Benetti (play-by-play), Brock Huard (analyst), and Allison Williams (sideline reporter)
- Box Score Recap

Game information

First quarter

- (8:37) UTAH – Money Parks 28-yard pass from Cameron Rising (Cole Becker kick) (Drive: 4 plays, 56 yards, 2:10; Utah 7-0)
- (8:17) UTAH – Micah Bernard 2-yard pass from Cameron Rising (Cole Becker kick) (Drive: 1 play, 3 yards, 0:13; Utah 14-0)
- (0:48) UTAH – Cole Becker 30-yard kick (Drive: 10 plays, 74 yards, 5:52; Utah 17-0)

Second quarter

- (5:21) UTAH – Tao Johnson 77-yard return of blocked field goal (2 point conversion failed) (Drive: 8 plays, 13 yards, 3:03; Utah 23-0)
- (0:00) BAYLOR – Isaiah Hankins 44-yard field goal (Drive: 4 plays, 46 yards, 0:29; Utah 23-3)

Third quarter

- (6:23) BAYLOR – Isaiah Hankins 39-yard field goal (Drive: 11 plays, 70 yards, 5:37; Utah 23-6)
- (0:53) BAYLOR – Josh Cameron 47-yard pass from Dequan Finn (2 point conversion failed) (Drive: 8 plays, 70 yards, 3:54; Utah 23-12)

Fourth quarter

No scoring

Statistics	BAY	UTAH
First downs	12	15
Total yards	223	292
Rushing yards	108	170
Passing yards	115	122
Passing: Comp–Att–Int	9–21–0	12–23–0
Time of possession	25:37	34:23

Team	Category	Player	Statistics
Baylor	Passing	Dequan Finn	9/21, 115 yards, TD
Baylor	Rushing	Dawson Pendergrass	9 carries, 69 yards
Baylor	Receiving	Josh Cameron	2 receptions, 59 yards, TD
Utah	Passing	Cameron Rising	8/14, 92 yards, 2 TD
Utah	Rushing	Micah Bernard	19 carries, 118 yards
Utah	Receiving	Money Parks	3 receptions, 80 yards, TD

=== vs Air Force ===
Air Force Falcons (1–1) vs Baylor Bears (1–1) – Game summary

Quarter	1	2	3	4	Total
Falcons	0	3	0	0	3
Bears	3	3	17	8	31

at McLane Stadium • Waco, TX

- Date: September 14, 2024
- Game time: 6:30 PM CST
- Game weather: Cloudy, 94 °F (34 °C)
- Game attendance: 46,212
- Referee: Nolan Dumas
- TV announcers (FS1): Alex Faust (play-by-play) and Robert Smith (analyst)
- Box Score Recap

Game information

First quarter
Second quarter
Third quarter
Fourth quarter

Statistics	AFA	BAY
First downs	12	20
Total yards	218	478
Rushing yards	193	230
Passing yards	25	248
Passing: Comp–Att–Int	2-8-1	18-24-0
Time of possession	33:58	26:02

Team	Category	Player	Statistics
Air Force	Passing	Josh Johnson	1/2, 18 Yards
Air Force	Rushing	Cade Harris	8 Carries, 71 Yards
Air Force	Receiving	Tre Robertson	1 Reception, 18 Yards
Baylor	Passing	Sawyer Robertson	18/24, 248 Yards
Baylor	Rushing	Bryson Washington	12 Carries, 106 Yards, 1 TD
Baylor	Receiving	Ashtyn Hawkins	4 Receptions, 81 Yards

=== at Colorado ===
Baylor Bears (2–1) at Colorado Buffaloes (2–1) – Game summary

Quarter	1	2	3	4	OT	Total
Bears	3	21	0	7	0	31
Buffaloes	7	10	7	7	7	38

at Folsom Field • Boulder, CO

- Date: September 21, 2024
- Game time: 7:00 p.m. CST
- Game weather: Cloudy, 62 °F (17 °C), NW 9 mph
- Game attendance: 52,794
- Referee: Mike McCabe
- TV announcers (FOX/ESPN Radio): Connor Onion (play-by-play) and Mark Helfrich (analyst)/Mike Couzens (play-by-play), Max Starks (analyst), and Mike Peasley (sideline)
- Box Score Recap

Game information

First quarter

- (8:13) BAY – Isaiah Hankins 32-yard field goal (Drive: 5 plays, 23 yards, 2:02, Baylor 3-0)
- (1:56) COL – Shedeur Sanders 2-yard run, Alejandro Mata kick (Drive: 11 plays, 75 yards, 6:17, Colorado 7-3)

Second quarter

- (14:26) BAY – Monaray Baldwin 30-yard pass from Sawyer Robertson, Isaiah Hankins kick (Drive: 7 plays, 75 yards, 2:30, Baylor 10-7)
- (6:55) COL – Alejandro Mata 43-yard field goal (Drive: 10 plays, 55 yards, 4:41, Tied 10-10)
- (6:44) BAY – Jamaal Bell 100-yard kickoff return, Isaiah Hankins kick (Baylor 17-10)
- (4:19) BAY – Sawyer Robertson 45-yard run, Isaiah Hankins kick (Drive: 4 plays, 54 yards, 1:25, Baylor 24-10)
- (0:50) COL – Omarion Miller 58-yard pass from Shedeur Sanders, Alejandro Mata kick (Drive: 5 plays, 78 yards, 1:48, Baylor 24-17)

Third quarter

- (1:00) COL – Micah Welch 2-yard run, Alejandro Mata kick (Drive: 6 plays, 80 yards, 2:28, Tied 24-24)

Fourth quarter

- (5:43) BAY – Hal Presley 24-yard pass from Sawyer Robertson, Isaiah Hankins kick (Drive: 8 plays, 61 yards, 3:29, Baylor 31-24)
- (0:00) COL – LaJohntay Wester 43-yard pass from Shedeur Sanders, Alejandro Mata kick (Drive: 8 plays, 72 yards, 2:16, Tied 31-31)

Overtime

- (0:00) COL – Micah Welch 1-yard run, Alejandro Mata kick (Drive: 7 plays, 25 yards, 0:00, Colorado 38-31)

Statistics	BAY	COL
First downs	15	24
Total yards	314	432
Rushing yards	166	92
Passing yards	148	341
Passing: Comp–Att–Int	11–20–0	25–41–0
Time of possession	23:52	36:08

Team	Category	Player	Statistics
Baylor	Passing	Sawyer Robertson	11/21, 148 yards, 2 TD
Baylor	Rushing	Sawyer Robertson	9 carries, 82 yards, TD
Baylor	Receiving	Hal Presley	2 receptions, 43 yards, TD
Colorado	Passing	Shedeur Sanders	25/41, 341 yards, 2 TD
Colorado	Rushing	Isaiah Augustave	12 carries, 41 yards
Colorado	Receiving	Travis Hunter	7 receptions, 130 yards

=== vs No. 22 BYU ===
No. 22 BYU Cougars (4–0) vs Baylor Bears (2–2) – Game summary

Quarter	1	2	3	4	Total
No. 22 Cougars	21	10	3	0	34
Bears	7	7	7	7	28

at McLane Stadium • Waco, TX

- Date: September 28, 2024
- Game time: 11:00 a.m. CST
- Game weather: Sunny, 79 °F (26 °C)
- Game attendance: 39,583
- Referee: Kevin Mar
- TV announcers (FS1): Alex Faust (play-by-play) and Robert Smith (analyst)
- Box Score Recap

Game information

First quarter
Second quarter
Third quarter
Fourth quarter

Statistics	BYU	BAY
First downs	20	21
Total yards	367	387
Rushing yards	151	63
Passing yards	216	324
Passing: Comp–Att–Int	17-32-2	27-48-2
Time of possession	31:04	28:56

Team	Category	Player	Statistics
BYU	Passing	Jake Retzlaff	17-31, 216 Yards, 2 TD, 2 INT
BYU	Rushing	Jake Retzlaff	6 Carries, 53 Yards, TD
BYU	Receiving	Darius Lassiter	8 Receptions, 120 Yards, TD
Baylor	Passing	Sawyer Robertson	27-48, 324 Yards, 3 TD, 2 INT
Baylor	Rushing	Bryson Washington	13 Carries, 31 Yards
Baylor	Receiving	Josh Cameron	7 Receptions, 125 Yards, 2 TD

=== at No. 16 Iowa State ===
Baylor Bears (2–3) at No. 16 Iowa State Cyclones (4–0) – Game summary

Quarter	1	2	3	4	Total
Bears	7	7	7	0	21
No. 16 Cyclones	3	16	14	10	43

at Jack Trice Stadium • Ames, IA

- Date: October 5, 2024
- Game time: 6:30 p.m. CST
- Game weather: Sunny, 83 °F (28 °C)
- Game attendance: 61,500
- Referee: Tutashinda Salaam
- TV announcers (FOX): Tim Brando (play-by-play), Devin Gardner (analyst), and Josh Sims (sideline reporter)
- Box Score Recap

Game information

First quarter

- (6:32) BAY – Josh Cameron 4 Yd pass from Sawyer Robertson (Isaiah Hankins Kick) (Drive: 9 plays, 84 yards, 2:44; Baylor 7–0)
- (3:19) ISU - Kyle Konrardy 45 Yd Field Goal (Drive: 7 plays, 48 yards, 3:13; Baylor 7–3)

Second quarter

- (13:46) BAY - Michael Trigg 8 Yd pass from Sawyer Robertson (Isaiah Hankins Kick) (Drive: 10 plays, 75 yards, 4:33; Baylor 14-3)
- (10:34) ISU - Kyle Konrardy 38 Yd Field Goal (Drive: 8 plays, 30 yards, 3:12; Baylor 14-6)
- (6:10) ISU - Benjamin Brahmer 10 Yd pass from Rocco Becht (Kyle Konrardy PAT failed) (Drive: 5 plays, 84 yards, 2:27; Baylor 14-12)
- (4:46) ISU - Caden Matson 25 Yd Return of Blocked Punt (Kyle Konrardy Kick) (Drive: 5 plays, 13 yards, 1:24; Iowa State 19-14)

Third quarter

- (12:55) BAY - Ketron Jackson Jr. 25 Yd pass from Sawyer Robertson (Isaiah Hankins Kick) (Drive: 7 plays, 65 yards, 2:05; Baylor 21-19)
- (10:33) ISU - Jaylon Jackson 10 Yd Run (Kyle Konrardy Kick) (Drive: 5 plays, 75 yards, 2:22; Iowa State 26-21)
- (0:40) ISU - Jayden Higgins 11 Yd pass from Rocco Becht (Kyle Konrardy Kick) (Drive: 13 plays, 80 yards, 6:08; Iowa State 33-21)

Fourth quarter

- (11:31) ISU - Jaylon Jackson 20 Yd Run (Kyle Konrardy Kick) (Drive: 5 plays, 76 yards, 2:41; Iowa State 40-21)
- (2:16) ISU - Kyle Konrardy 22 Yd Field Goal (Drive: 12 plays, 73 yards, 8:41; Drive: 12 plays, 73 yards, 8:11; Iowa State 43-21)

Statistics	BAY	ISU
First downs	21	27
Total yards	337	542
Rushing yards	79	265
Passing yards	258	277
Passing: Comp–Att–Int	25–44–1	16–25–1
Time of possession	24:06	35:54

Team	Category	Player	Statistics
Baylor	Passing	Sawyer Robertson	25/44, 258 yards, 3 TD, INT
Baylor	Rushing	Bryson Washington	8 carries, 28 yards
Baylor	Receiving	Ketron Jackson Jr.	5 receptions, 66 yards, TD
Iowa State	Passing	Rocco Becht	16/25, 277 yards, 2 TD, INT
Iowa State	Rushing	Jaylon Jackson	15 carries, 107 yards, 2 TD
Iowa State	Receiving	Jayden Higgins	8 receptions, 116 yards, TD

=== at Texas Tech (rivalry) ===
Baylor Bears (2–4) at Texas Tech Red Raiders (5–1) – Game summary

Quarter	1	2	3	4	Total
Bears	7	17	14	21	59
Red Raiders	7	7	7	14	35

at Jones AT&T Stadium • Lubbock, TX

- Date: October 19, 2024
- Game time: 3:00 p.m.
- Game weather: Cloudy, 70 °F (21 °C)
- Game attendance: 60,229
- Referee: Kevin Boitmann
- TV announcers (ESPN2): Beth Mowins (play-by-play), Rod Gilmore (analyst), and Lauren Sisler (sideline reporter)
- Box Score Recap

Game information

First quarter

- BAY – Bryson Washington 1-yard run (Isaiah Hankins kick), 5:54. Bears 7–0. Drive: 4 plays, 60 yards, 0:51.
- TTU – Caleb Douglas 12-yard pass from Behren Morton (Gino Garcia kick), 1:47. Tied 7–7. Drive: 8 plays, 65 yards, 4:07.

Second quarter

- BAY – Bryson Washington 1-yard run (Isaiah Hankins kick), 11:44. Bears 14–7. Drive: 1 play, 1 yard, 0:08.
- BAY – Isaiah Hankins 31-yard field goal, 10:30. Bears 17–7. Drive: 4 plays, 5 yards, 1:02.
- TTU – Caleb Douglas 20-yard pass from Jalin Conyers (Reese Burkhardt kick), 1:54. Bears 17–14. Drive: 10 plays, 80 yards, 4:18.
- BAY – Josh Cameron 6-yard pass from Sawyer Robertson (Isaiah Hankins kick), 0:04. Bears 24–14. Drive: 9 plays, 75 yards, 1:50.

Third quarter

- TTU – Tahj Brooks 31-yard run (Gino Garcia kick), 11:15. Bears 24–21. Drive: 7 plays, 86 yards, 3:01.
- BAY – Josh Cameron 11-yard pass from Sawyer Robertson (Isaiah Hankins kick), 6:17. Bears 31–21. Drive: 9 plays, 75 yards, 4:58.
- BAY – Hal Presley 35-yard pass from Sawyer Robertson (Isaiah Hankins kick), 3:08. Bears 38–21. Drive: 3 plays, 49 yards, 0:53.

Fourth quarter

- BAY – Monaray Baldwin 24-yard pass from Sawyer Robertson (Isaiah Hankins kick), 13:02. Bears 45–21. Drive: 5 plays, 71 yards, 2:01.
- BAY – Josh Cameron 12-yard pass from Sawyer Robertson (Isaiah Hankins kick), 9:41. Bears 52–21. Drive: 4 plays, 30 yards, 2:19.
- TTU – J'Koby Williams 18-yard pass from Behren Morton (pass failed), 6:31. Bears 52–27. Drive: 12 plays, 75 yards, 3:10.
- BAY – Dequan Finn 34-yard run (Isaiah Hankins kick), 5:40. Bears 59–27. Drive: 4 plays, 43 yards, 0:50.
- TTU – Caleb Douglas 7-yard pass from Behren Morton (Behren Morton pass to Josh Kelly), 2:01. Bears 59–35. Drive: 10 plays, 75 yards, 3:39.

Statistics	BAY	TTU
First downs	23	29
Total yards	529	455
Rushing yards	255	149
Passing yards	274	306
Passing: Comp–Att–Int	21–32–0	34–50–1
Time of possession	24:07	35:53

Team	Category	Player	Statistics
Baylor	Passing	Sawyer Robertson	21/32, 274 yards, 5 TD
Baylor	Rushing	Bryson Washington	10 carries, 116 yards, 2 TD
Baylor	Receiving	Josh Cameron	6 receptions, 75 yards, 3 TD
Texas Tech	Passing	Behren Morton	33/49, 286 yards, 3 TD, INT
Texas Tech	Rushing	Tahj Brooks	25 carries, 125 yards, TD
Texas Tech	Receiving	Caleb Douglas	9 receptions, 99 yards, 3 TD

=== vs Oklahoma State ===
Oklahoma State Cowboys (3–4) vs Baylor Bears (3–4) – Game summary

Quarter	1	2	3	4	Total
Cowboys	3	14	3	8	28
Bears	3	14	7	14	38

at McLane Stadium • Waco, TX

- Date: October 26, 2024
- Game time: 2:30 p.m.
- Game weather: Sunny, 87 °F (31 °C)
- Game attendance: 44,987
- Referee: Michael VanderVelde
- TV announcers (ESPN+): Ted Emrich (play-by-play) and Charles Arbuckle (analyst)
- Box Score Recap

Game information

First quarter

- (10:00) OSU – Logan Ward 45 yard field goal (Drive: 7 plays, 32 yards, 2:39; OSU 3–0)
- (5:55) BAY – Isaiah Hankins 30 yard field goal (Drive: 10 plays, 74 yards, 3:59; Tied 3–3)

Second quarter

- (12:42) BAY – Sawyer Robertson 12 yard pass to Hal Presley, Isaiah Hankins kick (Drive: 4 plays, 99 yards, 1:36; BAY 10–3)
- (9:22) OSU – Alan Bowman 33 yard pass to Brennan Presley, Logan Ward kick (Drive: 7 plays, 75 yards, 3:20; Tied 10–10)
- (6:28) BAY – Sawyer Robertson 1 yard pass to Matthew Klopfenstein, Isaiah Hankins kick (Drive: 6 plays, 73 yards, 2:48; BAY 17–10)
- (0:18) OSU – Ollie Gordon II 2 yard rush, Logan Ward kick (Drive: 10 plays, 64 yards, 3:06; Tied 17–17)

Third quarter

- (8:32) BAY – Sawyer Robertson 33 yard pass to Ashtyn Hawkins, Isaiah Hankins kick (Drive: 3 plays, 57 yards, 0:59; BAY 24–17)
- (2:49) OSU – Logan Ward 26 yard field goal (Drive: 9 plays, 75 yards, 5:37; BAY 24–20)

Fourth quarter

- (8:55) BAY – Sawyer Robertson 41 yard rush, Isaiah Hankins kick (Drive: 8 plays, 95 yards, 3:18; BAY 31–20)
- (4:51) OSU – Ollie Gordon II 3 yard rush, Ollie Gordon II 2 point pass to Brennan Presley (Drive: 11 plays, 75 yards, 4:04; BAY 31–28)
- (3:06) BAY – Dawson Pendergrass 55 yard rush, Isaiah Hankins kick (Drive: 4 plays, 75 yards, 1:45; BAY 38–28)

Statistics	OKST	BAY
First downs	25	22
Total yards	433	565
Rushing yards	74	343
Passing yards	359	222
Passing: Comp–Att–Int	28-42-1	11-20-1
Time of possession	35:01	24:59

Team	Category	Player	Statistics
Oklahoma State	Passing	Alan Bowman	28/42, 359 Yards, TD, INT
Oklahoma State	Rushing	Ollie Gordon II	18 Carries, 77 Yards, TD
Oklahoma State	Receiving	Brennan Presley	15 Receptions, 183 Yards, TD
Baylor	Passing	Sawyer Robertson	11-19, 222 Yards, 3 TD, INT
Baylor	Rushing	Dawson Pendergrass	6 Carries, 142 Yards, TD
Baylor	Receiving	Ashtyn Hawkins	4 Receptions, 74 Yards, TD

=== vs TCU (rivalry) ===
TCU Horned Frogs (5–3) vs Baylor Bears (4–4) – Game summary

Quarter	1	2	3	4	Total
Horned Frogs	7	10	10	7	34
Bears	7	6	7	17	37

at McLane Stadium • Waco, TX

- Date: November 2, 2024
- Game time: 7:00 p.m.
- Game weather: 76 °F (24 °C)
- Game attendance: 44,171
- Referee: David Alvarez
- TV announcers (ESPN2/Gridiron Radio): Mike Couzens (play-by-play), Brock Osweiler (analyst), and Stormy Buonantony (sideline)/Noah Britt (play-by-play), Jon Reynolds (analyst), and Patrick Johnson (sideline)
- Box Score Recap

Game information

First quarter

- (6:42) TCU – Jordyn Bailey 8-yard Pass from Josh Hoover, (Kyle Lemmerman Kick) Horned Frogs 7–0. Drive: 7 plays, 95 yards, 3:01.
- (1:48) BAY – Bryson Washington 8-yard Rush (Isaiah Hankins Kick) Tied 7-7. Drive: 10 Plays, 65 yards, 4:54.

Second quarter

- (8:41) BAY – Bryson Washinton 40-yard Rush (Isaiah Hankins Kick NO GOOD) Bears 13-7. Drive: 4 Plays, 64 yards, 2:00
- (:50) TCU – Josh Hoover 1-yard Rush (Kyle Lemmerman Kick) Horned Frogs 17-13 Drive: 11 Plays, 68 Yards, 3:36.

Third quarter

- (5:18) TCU – Kyle Lemmerman 47-yard Field Goal Bears 13-10 Drive: 8 Plays, 47 yards, 3:23.
- (5:09) BAY – Dawson Pendergrass 1-yard Rush (Isaiah Hankins Kick) Tied 20-20 Drive: 9 Plays, 75 Yards, 3:55
- (:23) TCU – Jack Bech 6-yard Pass from Savion Williams (Kyle Lemmerman Kick) Horned Frogs 27-20 Drive: 9 Plays, 75 Yards, 4:46

Fourth quarter

- (14:03) BAY – Bryson Washington 35-yard Rush (Isaiah Hankins Kick) Tied 27-27 Drive: 5 Plays, 75 Yards, 1:20
- (4:54) BAY – Bryson Washington 1-yard Rush (Isaiah Hankins Kick) Bears 34-27 Drive: 13 Plays, 81 Yards, 5:28
- (1:55) TCU – Jack Bech 24-yard Pass from Josh Hoover (Kyle Lemmerman Kick) Tied 34-34 Drive: 8 Plays, 75 Yards, 2:59
- (:00) BAY – Isaiah Hankins 33-yard Field Goal Bears 37-34 Drive: 11 Plays, 59 Yards, 1:55

Statistics	TCU	BAY
First downs	25	31
Total yards	444	499
Rushing yards	105	257
Passing yards	339	242
Passing: Comp–Att–Int	26–35–0	19–34–0
Time of possession	31:35	28:25

Team	Category	Player	Statistics
TCU	Passing	Josh Hoover	25/34, 333 yards, 2 TD
TCU	Rushing	Savion Williams	8 carries, 57 yards
TCU	Receiving	Savion Williams	8 receptions, 92 yards
Baylor	Passing	Sawyer Robertson	19/34, 242 yards
Baylor	Rushing	Bryson Washington	26 carries, 196 yards, 4 TD
Baylor	Receiving	Josh Cameron	4 receptions, 59 yards

=== at West Virginia ===
Baylor Bears (5–4) at West Virginia Mountaineers (5–4) – Game summary

Quarter	1	2	3	4	Total
Bears	14	21	0	14	49
Mountaineers	7	21	0	7	35

at Milan Puskar Stadium • Morgantown, WV

- Date: November 16, 2024
- Game time: 3:00 p.m.
- Game weather: Cloudy, 51 °F (11 °C)
- Game attendance: 52,306
- Referee: Luke Richmond
- TV announcers (ESPN2): Mike Monaco (play-by-play), Kirk Morrison (analyst), and Dawn Davenport (sideline)
- Box Score Recap

Game information

First quarter

- (9:34) WVU – Garrett Greene 3-yard run (Michael Hayes II Kick) Mountaineers 7–0. Drive: 12 plays, 79 yards, 5:23.
- (7:10) BAY – Bryson Washington 22-yard pass from Sawyer Robertson (Isaiah Hankins Kick) Tied 7-7. Drive: 7 plays, 75 yards, 2:24.
- (3:07) BAY – Josh Cameron 43-yard pass from Sawyer Robertson (Isaiah Hankins Kick) Bears 14–7. Drive: 6 plays, 80 yards, 2:22.

Second quarter

- (13:04) WVU – Traylon Ray 9-yard pass from Garrett Greene (Michael Hayes II Kick) Tied 14-14. Drive: 12 plays, 85 yards, 4:58.
- (4:22) BAY – Monaray Baldwin 40-yard pass from Sawyer Robertson (Isaiah Hankins Kick) Bears 21–14. Drive: 5 plays, 65 yards, 2:02.
- (2:13) BAY – Bryson Washington 51-yard run (Isaiah Hankins Kick) Bears 28–14. Drive: 2 plays, 51 yards, 0:13.
- (1:47) WVU – CJ Donaldson Jr. 23-yard run (Michael Hayes II Kick) Bears 28–21. Drive: 3 plays, 41 yards, 0:26.
- (0:47) BAY – Bryson Washington 8-yard run (Isaiah Hankins Kick) Bears 35–21. Drive: 7 plays, 55 yards, 0:52.
- (0:00) WVU – Garrett Greene 1-yard run (Michael Hayes II Kick) Bears 35–28. Drive: 8 plays, 75 yards, 0:47.

Third quarter

No scoring plays

Fourth quarter

- (8:07) BAY – Bryson Washington 9-yard run (Isaiah Hankins Kick) Bears 42–28. Drive: 10 plays, 65 yards, 4:02.
- (3:24) BAY – Dawson Pendergrass 15-yard run (Isaiah Hankins Kick) Bears 49–28. Drive: 8 plays, 47 yards, 3:42.
- (0:55) WVU – Kole Taylor 11-yard pass from Garrett Greene (Michael Hayes II Kick) Bears 49–35. Drive: 15 plays, 75 yards, 2:29.

Statistics	BAY	WVU
First downs	26	29
Total yards	512	499
Rushing yards	183	262
Passing yards	329	237
Passing: Comp–Att–Int	26-36-0	19-39-1
Time of possession	28:07	31:53

Team	Category	Player	Statistics
Baylor	Passing	Sawyer Robertson	26/36, 329 Yards, 3 TD
Baylor	Rushing	Bryson Washington	18 Carries, 123 Yards, 3 TD
Baylor	Receiving	Josh Cameron	5 Receptions, 101 Yards, TD
West Virginia	Passing	Garrett Greene	19/39, 237 Yards, 2 TD, 1 INT
West Virginia	Rushing	Garrett Greene	22 Carries, 129 Yards, 2 TD
West Virginia	Receiving	Hudson Clement	3 Receptions, 71 Yards

=== at Houston (rivalry) ===
Baylor Bears (6–4) at Houston Cougars (4–6) – Game summary

Quarter	1	2	3	4	Total
Bears	7	10	0	3	20
Cougars	7	0	0	3	10

at TDECU Stadium • Houston, TX

- Date: November 23, 2024
- Game time: 6:00 p.m.
- Game weather: Clear • Temperature: 68 °F (20 °C) • Wind: SE 12 miles per hour (19 km/h)
- Game attendance: 34,166
- Referee: Henry Johns
- TV announcers (FS1): Connor Onion (play-by-play) and Spencer Tillman (analyst)

Game information

First quarter

- (6:11) BAY – Sawyer Robertson 5-yard pass from Sawyer Robertson, Isaiah Hankins kick (Drive: 14 plays, 80 yards, 5:20; Baylor 7–0)
- (0:32) HOU – Jeremiah Wilson 41-yard interception, Jack Martin kick (Tied 7–7)

Second quarter

- (9:50) BAY – Ashtyn Hawkins 23-yard pass from Sawyer Robertson, Isaiah Hankins kick (Drive: 11 plays, 74 yards, 5:35; Baylor 14–7)
- (0:00) BAY – Isaiah Hankins 45-yard field goal (Drive: 11 plays, 59 yards, 6:03; Baylor 17–7)

Third quarter

No scoring plays

Fourth quarter

- (14:52) HOU – Jack Martin 24-yard field goal (Drive: 13 plays, 74 yards, 6:13; Baylor 17–10)
- (4:24) BAY – Isaiah Hankins 50-yard field goal (Drive: 4 plays, 6 yards, 1:58; Baylor 20–10)

Statistics	BAY	HOU
First downs	20	14
Total yards	325	239
Rushing yards	121	92
Passing yards	204	147
Passing: Comp–Att–Int	15–23–2	14–25–3
Time of possession	34:52	25:08

Team	Category	Player	Statistics
Baylor	Passing	Sawyer Robertson	15/23, 204 yards, 2 TD, 3 INT
Baylor	Rushing	Bryson Washington	28 carries, 113 yards
Baylor	Receiving	Michael Trigg	4 receptions, 96 yards, TD
Houston	Passing	Zeon Chriss	13/24, 126 yards, 3 INT
Houston	Rushing	Re'Shaun Sanford II	8 carries, 37 yards
Houston	Receiving	Stephon Johnson	3 receptions, 54 yards

=== vs Kansas ===
Kansas Jayhawks (5–6) vs Baylor Bears (7–4) – Game summary

Quarter	1	2	3	4	Total
Jayhawks	7	3	7	0	17
Bears	7	14	21	3	45

at McLane Stadium • Waco, TX

- Date: November 30, 2024
- Game time: 11:00 a.m.
- Game weather: 52 °F (11 °C)
- Game attendance: 36,585
- Referee: Kevin Boitmann
- TV announcers (ESPN2): Clay Matvick (play-by-play), Steve Addazio (analyst), and Tori Petry (sideline)

Game information

First quarter
Second quarter
Third quarter
Fourth quarter

Statistics	KU	BAY
First downs	19	32
Total yards	491	603
Rushing yards	211	293
Passing yards	280	310
Passing: Comp–Att–Int	12-23-2	23-31-0
Time of possession	25:36	50:58

Team	Category	Player	Statistics
Kansas	Passing	Jalon Daniels	12-23, 280 Yards, 2 INT
Kansas	Rushing	Devin Neal	20 Carries, 133 Yards, TD
Kansas	Receiving	Quentin Skinner	3 Receptions, 77 Yards
Baylor	Passing	Sawyer Robertson	23-31, 310 Yards, 4 TD
Baylor	Rushing	Bryson Washington	28 Carries, 192 Yards, 2 TD
Baylor	Receiving	Monaray Baldwin	7 Receptions, 119 Yards, 2 TD

=== vs. LSU (Texas Bowl) ===
2024 Texas Bowl
LSU Tigers (8–4) vs Baylor Bears (8–4) – Game summary

Quarter	1	2	3	4	Total
Bears	0	17	7	7	31
Tigers	14	20	0	10	44

at NRG Stadium • Houston, TX

- Date: Tuesday December 31, 2024
- Game time: 2:30 PM CST
- Game weather: Indoor
- Game attendance: 59,940
- Referee: Justin Elliot
- TV announcers (ESPN/Bowl Season Radio/KILT): Roy Philpott (play-by-play), Sam Acho (analyst), and Taylor Davis (sideline)/Kevin Eschenfelder (play-by-play), Justin Fuente (analyst), and J.P. Heath (sideline)/Brett Dolan (play-by-play) and John Harris (analyst)

Game information

First quarter

- (8:31) LSU – Trey'Dez Green 10 yard pass from Garrett Nussmeier, Damian Ramos kick (Drive: 12 plays, 68 yards, 6:22; LSU 7–0)
- (6:40) LSU – Davhon Keys 41 yard interception return (Drive: 5 plays, 18 yards, 1:51; LSU 14–0)

Second quarter

- (14:54) BAY – Josh Cameron 21 yard pass from Sawyer Robertson, Isaiah Hankins kick (Drive: 5 plays, 50 yards, 1:22; LSU 14–7)
- (12:16) LSU – Chris Hilton Jr. 41 yard pass from Garrett Nussmeier, Damian Ramos kick (Drive: 5 plays, 81 yards, 2:30; LSU 21–7)
- (8:46) LSU – Trey'Dez Green 1 yard pass from Garrett Nussmeier, Damian Ramos kick (Drive: 6 plays, 58 yards, 1:30; LSU 28–7)
- (1:41) BAY – Dawson Pendergrass 1 yard run, Isaiah Hankins kick (Drive: 6 plays, 65 yards, 1:37; LSU 28–14)
- (1:28) LSU – Zavion Thomas 95 yard kickoff return, Damian Ramos PAT failed (Drive: 6 plays, 65 yards, 1:37; LSU 34–14)
- (0:00) BAY – Isaiah Hankins 23 yard field goal (Drive: 10 plays, 69 yards, 1:28; LSU 34–17)

Third quarter

- (6:21) BAY – Ashtyn Hawkins 4 yard pass from Sawyer Robertson, Isaiah Hankins kick (Drive: 6 plays, 63 yards, 2:34; LSU 34–24)

Fourth quarter

- (14:56) LSU – Josh Williams 4 yard run, Damian Ramos kick (Drive: 7 plays, 47 yards, 3:05; LSU 41–24)
- (9:46) LSU – Damian Ramos 43 yard field goal (Drive: 5 plays, 27 yards, 2:20; LSU 44–24)
- (6:20) BAY – Dawson Pendergrass 3 yard run, Isaiah Hankins kick (Drive: 9 plays, 75 yards, 3:26; LSU 44–31)

Statistics	BAY	LSU
First downs	31	20
Total yards	507	418
Rushing yards	62	114
Passing yards	445	304
Passing: Comp–Att–Int	30-51-1	24-34-1
Time of possession	30:22	29:38

Team	Category	Player	Statistics
Baylor	Passing	Sawyer Robertson	30/51, 445 yard, 2 TD, INT
Baylor	Rushing	Dawson Pendergrass	21 carries, 63 yards, 2 TD
Baylor	Receiving	Josh Cameron	8 receptions, 111 yards, TD
LSU	Passing	Garrett Nussmeier	24/34, 304 yards, 3 TD, INT
LSU	Rushing	Caden Durham	13 carries, 60 yards
LSU	Receiving	Chris Hilton	4 receptions, 113 yards, TD
