= 2023 Baylor Bears football team =

American college football season

2023 Baylor Bears football
- Conference: Big 12 Conference
- Record: 3–9 (2–7 Big 12)
- Head coach: Dave Aranda (4th season)
- Offensive coordinator: Jeff Grimes (3rd season)
- Offensive scheme: Multiple
- Defensive coordinator: Matt Powledge (1st season)
- Base defense: 3–4
- Home stadium: McLane Stadium

Uniform
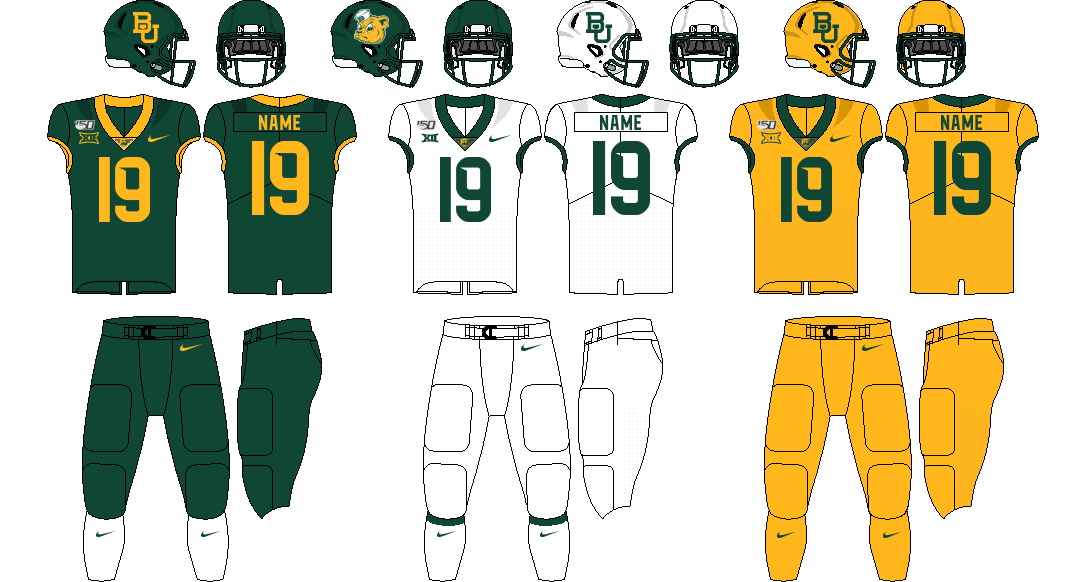

2023 Big 12 Conference football standings
	Conf.			Overall
Team	W		L	W		L
No. 3 Texas y$^	8	–	1	12	–	2
No. 16 Oklahoma State y	7	–	2	10	–	4
No. 15 Oklahoma	7	–	2	10	–	3
Iowa State	6	–	3	7	–	6
No. 18 Kansas State	6	–	3	9	–	4
West Virginia	6	–	3	9	–	4
Texas Tech	5	–	4	7	–	6
No. 23 Kansas	5	–	4	9	–	4
UCF	3	–	6	6	–	7
TCU	3	–	6	5	–	7
Houston	2	–	7	4	–	8
BYU	2	–	7	5	–	7
Baylor	2	–	7	3	–	9
Cincinnati	1	–	8	3	–	9
Championship: Texas 49, Oklahoma State 21
^ – College Football Playoff participant; $ – Conference champion; y – Championship game participant; Rankings from AP Poll

The 2023 Baylor Bears football team represented Baylor University in the Big 12 Conference during the 2023 NCAA Division I FBS football season. The Bears were led by Dave Aranda in his fourth season as their head coach.

The Bears played eight of their 12 regular season games at home, the largest number in school history and the most home games in the NCAA FBS this year, along with Penn State, Arizona State and Mississippi State.

This was the first season with Big 12 membership at 14 teams, after the realignment upheaval of the preceding years, which saw the league add four teams (BYU, UCF, Houston and Cincinnati). Consequently, the football schedule was no longer a "round robin" in which every team plays every other team, as was the practice when the league had 10 teams. The league continued to play nine intra-conference games; therefore, the Bears in 2023 did not play BYU, Kansas, Oklahoma State or Oklahoma, which (along with Texas) was in its final year with the league before moving to the SEC. The Bears played three of the four newcomers.

Five Baylor players were named to national preseason watch lists for the following awards:

- Richard Reese, Maxwell Award, Doak Walker Award and Earl Campbell Tyler Rose Award
- Gabe Hall, Bronko Nagurski Trophy
- Clark Barrington, Rimington Trophy
- Blake Shapen, Johnny Unitas Golden Arm Award
- Alonzo Allen, Wuerffel Trophy

The Bears played their home games at McLane Stadium in Waco, Texas, its 9th year of hosting play. The Bears failed to qualify for a bowl game and suffered their first losing season since 2020 following their loss to Kansas State.

== Schedule ==
Date	Time	Opponent	Site	TV	Result	Attendance
September 2	6:00 p.m.	Texas State*	McLane Stadium; Waco, TX	ESPN+	L 31–42	44,945
September 9	11:00 a.m.	No. 12 Utah*	McLane Stadium; Waco, TX	ESPN	L 13–20	43,732
September 16	11:00 a.m.	LIU*	McLane Stadium; Waco, TX	ESPN+	W 30–7	43,732
September 23	6:30 p.m.	No. 3 Texas	McLane Stadium; Waco, TX (rivalry)	ABC	L 6–38	49,165
September 30	2:30 p.m.	at UCF	FBC Mortgage Stadium; Orlando, FL	FS1	W 36–35	44,005
October 7	7:00 p.m.	Texas Tech	McLane Stadium; Waco, TX (rivalry)	ESPN2	L 14–39	44,620
October 21	11:00 a.m.	at Cincinnati	Nippert Stadium; Cincinnati, OH	ESPN+	W 32–29	38,193
October 28	2:30 p.m.	Iowa State^{†}	McLane Stadium; Waco, TX	ESPN+	L 18–30	43,528
November 4	2:30 p.m.	Houston	McLane Stadium; Waco, TX (rivalry)	ESPN+	L 24–25 ^{OT}	41,180
November 11	2:00 p.m.	at No. 25 Kansas State	Bill Snyder Family Football Stadium; Manhattan, KS	ESPN+	L 25–59	51,790
November 18	2:30 p.m.	at TCU	Amon G. Carter Stadium; Fort Worth, TX (The Revivalry)	ESPN+	L 17–42	42,621
November 25	6:00 p.m.	West Virginia	McLane Stadium; Waco, TX	FS1	L 31–34	36,200
*Non-conference game; ^{†}Homecoming; Rankings from AP Poll (and CFP Rankings, after November 2) - Released prior to game; All times are in Central time

== Game summaries ==
=== vs. Texas State ===
Texas State Bobcats (0–0) vs. Baylor Bears (0–0)

Quarter	1	2	3	4	Total
Texas State	14	14	7	7	42
Baylor	6	7	11	7	31

at McLane Stadium • Waco, TX

- Date: Saturday, September 2, 2023
- Game time: 6:00 p.m. CDT
- Game weather: Sunny • Temperature: 99 °F (37 °C)
- Game attendance: 44,945
- Referee: David Alvarez
- TV announcers (ESPN+): Peter Sousa and LaDarrin McLane

Scoring summary

Quarter	Time	Drive			Team	Scoring information	Score	
Quarter	Time	Plays	Yards	TOP	Team	Scoring information	Texas State	Baylor
1st	10:17	8	59	03:55	Baylor	23-yard field goal by Isaiah Hankins	0	3
1st	07:33	8	75	02:44	Texas State	Ismail Mahdi 10-yard touchdown reception from TJ Finley, Mason Shipley kick good	7	3
1st	02:26	5	0	02:36	Baylor	53-yard field goal by Isaiah Hankins	7	6
1st	01:21	3	72	01:00	Texas State	Ismail Mahdi 65-yard touchdown run, Mason Shipley kick good	14	6
2nd	09:11	13	60	05:36	Texas State	Donerio Davenport 27-yard touchdown reception from TJ Finley, Mason Shipley kick good	21	6
2nd	04:06	9	72	04:57	Baylor	Blake Shapen 9-yard touchdown run, Isaiah Hankins kick good	21	13
2nd	00:48	12	75	03:18	Texas State	Jahmyl Jeter 1-yard touchdown run, Mason Shipley kick good	28	13
3rd	13:21	3	62	01:33	Baylor	Drake Dabney 53-yard touchdown reception from Blake Shapen, Isaiah Hankins kick good	28	21
3rd	10:18	8	75	03:03	Texas State	TJ Finley 16-yard touchdown run, Mason Shipley kick good	35	21
3rd	01:47	9	38	04:14	Baylor	24-yard field goal by Isaiah Hankins	35	24
4th	13:52	6	75	02:55	Texas State	Joey Hobert 26-yard touchdown reception from TJ Finley, Mason Shipley kick good	42	24
4th	08:52	12	78	04:53	Baylor	Drake Dabney 2-yard touchdown reception from Blake Shapen, Isaiah Hankins kick good	42	31
"TOP" = time of possession. For other American football terms, see Glossary of American football.							42	31

Statistics	Texas State	Baylor
First downs	20	22
Plays–yards	69–441	76–524
Rushes–yards	39–143	32–108
Passing yards	298	416
Passing: comp–att–int	22–30–0	27–44–1
Turnovers		
Time of possession	26:12	33:48

Team	Category	Player	Statistics
Texas State	Passing	T. J. Finley	22–30, 298 yards, 3 TD
Texas State	Rushing	Ismail Mahdi	6 carries, 83 yards, 1 TD
Texas State	Receiving	Joey Hobert	6 receptions, 105 yards, 1 TD
Baylor	Passing	Blake Shapen	21–31, 303 yards, 2 TD
Baylor	Rushing	Dominic Richardson	16 carries, 84 yards
Baylor	Receiving	Drake Dabney	6 receptions, 101 yards, 2 TD

=== vs. Utah ===
No. 12 Utah Utes (1–0) vs. Baylor Bears (0–1)

Quarter	1	2	3	4	Total
No. 12 Utah	0	3	3	14	20
Baylor	0	10	3	0	13

at McLane Stadium • Waco, TX

- Date: Saturday, September 9, 2022
- Game time: 11:00 a.m. CDT
- Game weather: sunny • Temperature: 90 °F (32 °C)
- Game attendance: 43,732
- Referee: Christopher Wiggins
- TV announcers (ESPN): Bob Wischusen (play-by-play), Robert Griffin III (analyst), Kris Budden (sideline)

Scoring summary

Quarter	Time	Drive			Team	Scoring information	Score	
Quarter	Time	Plays	Yards	TOP	Team	Scoring information	Utah	Baylor
2nd	13:03	6	15	02:05	Baylor	34-yard field goal by Isaiah Hankins	0	3
2nd	09:04	7	62	03:59	Utah	31-yard field goal by Cole Becker	3	3
2nd	03:23	11	79	05:41	Baylor	Sawyer Robertson 4-yard touchdown run, Isaiah Hankins kick good	3	10
3rd	11:00	10	68	04:00	Baylor	24-yard field goal by Isaiah Hankins	3	13
3rd	04:05	7	9	03:43	Utah	46-yard field goal by Cole Becker	6	13
4th	01:59	6	29	01:18	Utah	Nate Johnson 7-yard touchdown run, Cole Becker kick good	13	13
4th	00:17	6	29	01:18	Utah	Jaylon Glover 11-yard touchdown run, Cole Becker kick good	20	13
"TOP" = time of possession. For other American football terms, see Glossary of American football.							20	13

Statistics	Utah	Baylor
First downs	20	14
Plays–yards	73–377	57–339
Rushes–yards	47–224	29–121
Passing yards	153	218
Passing: comp–att–int	12–26–1	12–28–2
Turnovers		
Time of possession	36:17	23:43

Team	Category	Player	Statistics
Utah	Passing	Nate Johnson	6–7, 82 yards
Utah	Rushing	Ja'Quinden Jackson	19 carries, 13 yards
Utah	Receiving	Mikey Matthews	4 receptions, 48 yards
Baylor	Passing	Sawyer Robertson	12–28, 218 yards, 1 INT
Baylor	Rushing	Dominic Richardson	14 carries, 81 yards
Baylor	Receiving	Ketron Jackson, Jr.	4 receptions, 72 yards

=== vs. LIU ===
LIU Sharks (0–2) vs. Baylor Bears (0–2)

Quarter	1	2	3	4	Total
LIU	0	7	0	0	7
Baylor	7	9	7	7	30

at McLane Stadium • Waco, TX

- Date: Saturday, September 16, 2023
- Game time: 11:00 a.m. CDT
- Game weather: rain • Temperature: 76°F
- Game attendance: 43,732
- Referee: Nate Black
- TV: ESPN+

Scoring summary

Quarter	Time	Drive			Team	Scoring information	Score	
Quarter	Time	Plays	Yards	TOP	Team	Scoring information	LIU	Baylor
1st	03:44	13	92	05:52	Baylor	Richard Reese 13-yard touchdown run, Isaiah Hankins kick good	0	7
2nd	08:27	16	82	08:32	Baylor	Dawson Pendergrass 1-yard touchdown run, Isaiah Hankins kick good	0	14
2nd	06:55				Baylor	Jake Timm wild snap into endzone for safety	0	16
2nd	00:40	4	59	01:06	LIU	Chris Howell 10-yard touchdown run, Michael Coney kick good	7	16
3rd	06:51	13	76	06:27	Baylor	Richard Reese 13-yard touchdown run, Isaiah Hankins kick good	7	23
4th	05:45	10	57	04:58	Baylor	Drake Dabney 3-yard touchdown reception from Sawyer Robertson, Isaiah Hankins kick good	7	30
"TOP" = time of possession. For other American football terms, see Glossary of American football.							7	30

Statistics	LIU	Baylor
First downs	10	26
Plays–yards	43–143	75–391
Rushes–yards	29–143	48–270
Passing yards	40	121
Passing: comp–att–int	6–14–1	13–27–0
Turnovers		
Time of possession	23:36	36:24

Team	Category	Player	Statistics
LIU	Passing	Chris Howell	4–10, 41 yards, 1 INT
LIU	Rushing	Jaden Dawkins	1 carry, 42 yards
LIU	Receiving	Aviyon Smith Mack	1 reception, 35 yards
Baylor	Passing	Sawyer Robertson	10–22, 113 yards, 1 TD
Baylor	Rushing	Dawson Pendergrass	21 carries, 111 yards, 1 TD
Baylor	Receiving	Ketron Jackson, Jr.	2 receptions, 29 yards

=== vs. Texas ===
No. 3 Texas Longhorns (3–0) vs. Baylor Bears (1–2)

Quarter	1	2	3	4	Total
No. 3 Texas	7	21	10	0	38
Baylor	3	3	0	0	6

at McLane Stadium • Waco, TX

- Date: Saturday, September 23, 2023
- Game time: 6:30 p.m. CDT
- Game weather: sunny • Temperature: 97°F
- Game attendance: 49,165
- Referee: Derek Anderson
- TV announcers (ABC): Dave Pasch, Dusty Dvoracek, and Tom Luginbill

Scoring summary

Quarter	Time	Drive			Team	Scoring information	Score	
Quarter	Time	Plays	Yards	TOP	Team	Scoring information	Texas	Baylor
1st	05:15	2	55	00:46	Texas	Jonathon Brooks 40-yard touchdown run, Bert Auburn kick good	7	0
1st	01:07	9	70	04:08	Baylor	22-yard field goal by Isaiah Hankins	7	3
2nd	09:07	9	75	03:28	Texas	Quinn Ewers 29-yard touchdown run, Bert Auburn kick good	14	3
2nd	07:03	2	42	00:32	Texas	CJ Baxter 7-yard touchdown run, Bert Auburn kick good	21	3
2nd	02:26	5	46	01:49	Texas	Jonathon Brooks 2-yard touchdown run, Bert Auburn kick good	28	3
2nd	00:44	4	2	00:50	Baylor	36-yard field goal by Isaiah Hankins	28	6
3rd	12:24	6	55	02:36	Texas	37-yard field goal by Bert Auburn	31	6
3rd	05:36	7	95	03:28	Texas	Xavier Worthy 21-yard touchdown reception from Quinn Ewers, Bert Auburn kick good	38	6
"TOP" = time of possession. For other American football terms, see Glossary of American football.							38	6

Statistics	Texas	Baylor
First downs	24	19
Plays–yards	59–503	84–365
Rushes–yards	34–75	31–60
Passing yards	328	305
Passing: comp–att–int	19–25–0	29-53-1
Turnovers		
Time of possession	26:30	33:30

Team	Category	Player	Statistics
Texas	Passing	Quinn Ewers	18-23, 293 yards, 1 TD
Texas	Rushing	Jonathon Brooks	18 carries, 106 yards, 2 TD
Texas	Receiving	Ja'Tavion Sanders	5 receptions, 110 yards
Baylor	Passing	Sawyer Robertson	20-35, 203 yards, 1 INT
Baylor	Rushing	RJ Martinez	3 carries, 22 yards
Baylor	Receiving	Monaray Baldwin	3 receptions, 81 yards

=== at UCF ===
Baylor Bears (1–3) vs. UCF Knights (3–1)

Quarter	1	2	3	4	Total
Baylor	7	0	3	26	36
UCF	21	7	7	0	35

at FBC Mortgage Stadium • Orlando, FL

- Date: Saturday, September 30, 2023
- Game time: 3:30 p.m. EDT
- Game weather: cloudy • Temperature: 83 °F (28 °C)
- Game attendance: 44,005
- Referee: Henry Johns
- TV announcers (FS1): Eric Collins and Devin Gardner
- Gamecast

Scoring summary

Quarter	Time	Drive			Team	Scoring information	Score	
Quarter	Time	Plays	Yards	TOP	Team	Scoring information	Baylor	UCF
1st	13:13	1	79	00:12	UCF	Johnny Richardson 79-yard touchdown run, Colton Boomer kick good	0	7
1st	09:09	6	52	02:07	UCF	Timmy McClain 2-yard touchdown run, Colton Boomer kick good	0	14
1st	06:17	1	65	00:09	UCF	Javon Baker 65-yard touchdown reception from Timmy McClain, Colton Boomer kick good	0	21
1st	02:03	10	72	04:14	Baylor	Blake Shapen 2-yard touchdown run, Isaiah Hankins kick good	7	21
2nd	11:12				UCF	Fumble recovery returned 87 yards for touchdown by Demari Henderson, Colton Boomer kick good	7	28
3rd	08:07	14	84	06:46	UCF	Xavier Townsend 6-yard touchdown reception from Timmy McClain, Colton Boomer kick good	7	35
3rd	03:20	11	50	04:39	Baylor	30-yard field goal by Isaiah Hankins	10	35
4th	12:38	10	81	02:59	Baylor	Dawson Pendergrass 6-yard touchdown run, 2-point pass to Ketron Jackson, Jr. good	18	35
4th	09:38	5	55	01:17	Baylor	Monaray Baldwin 5-yard touchdown reception from Blake Shapen, 2-point pass to Jordan Nabors good	26	35
4th	06:02				Baylor	Fumble recovery returned 72 yards for touchdown by Caden Jenkins, Isaiah Hankins kick good	33	35
4th	01:21	9	61	03:25	Baylor	25-yard field goal by Isaiah Hankins	36	35
"TOP" = time of possession. For other American football terms, see Glossary of American football.							36	35

Statistics	Baylor	UCF
First downs	22	18
Plays–yards	77–446	61–469
Rushes–yards	43–153	35–235
Passing yards	293	234
Passing: comp–att–int	21–34–0	13-26-1
Turnovers		
Time of possession	35:31	24:29

Team	Category	Player	Statistics
Baylor	Passing	Blake Shapen	21-34, 293 yards, 1 TD
Baylor	Rushing	Richard Reese	16 carries, 100 yards
Baylor	Receiving	Monaray Baldwin	7 receptions, 150 yards, 1 TD
UCF	Passing	Timmy McClain	13-25, 234 yards, 2 TD, 1 INT
UCF	Rushing	Johnny Richardson	6 carries, 105 yards, 1 TD
UCF	Receiving	Javon Baker	3 receptions, 113 yards, 1 TD

=== vs. Texas Tech ===
Texas Tech Red Raiders (2–3) vs. Baylor Bears (2–3)

Quarter	1	2	3	4	Total
Texas Tech	7	10	7	15	39
Baylor	0	3	0	11	14

at McLane Stadium • Waco, TX

- Date: Saturday, October 7, 2023
- Game time: 7:00 p.m. CDT
- Game weather: clear • Temperature: 66 °F (19 °C)
- Game attendance: 44,620
- Referee: Michael VanderVelde
- TV announcers (ESPN2): Brian Custer, Rod Gilmore, and Lauren Sisler

Scoring summary

Quarter	Time	Drive			Team	Scoring information	Score	
Quarter	Time	Plays	Yards	TOP	Team	Scoring information	Texas Tech	Baylor
1st	09:46	11	75	05:14	Texas Tech	Coy Eaken 13-yard touchdown reception from Behren Morton, Gino Garcia kick good	7	0
2nd	13:06	7	59	03:01	Texas Tech	Baylor Cupp 16-yard touchdown reception from Behren Morton, Gino Garcia kick good	14	0
2nd	09:32	5	42	01:53	Baylor	33-yard field goal by Isaiah Hankins	14	3
2nd	00:09	4	7	01:08	Texas Tech	37-yard field goal by Gino Garcia	17	3
3rd	00:38	13	85	06:24	Texas Tech	Baylor Cupp 18-yard touchdown reception from Behren Morton, Gino Garcia kick good	24	3
4th	13:34	4	76	02:04	Baylor	Monaray Baldwin 71-yard touchdown reception from Blake Shapen, 2-point pass to Ketron Jackson, Jr. good	24	11
4th	09:15	8	65	04:19	Texas Tech	Tahj Brooks 18-yard touchdown run, 2-point run by Tahj Brooks good	32	11
4th	06:35	6	59	02:40	Baylor	33-yard field goal by Isaiah Hankins	32	14
4th	03:38	3	14	00:23	Texas Tech	Behren Morton 10-yard touchdown run, Gino Garcia kick good	39	14
"TOP" = time of possession. For other American football terms, see Glossary of American football.							39	14

Statistics	Texas Tech	Baylor
First downs	19	17
Plays–yards	68–366	68–341
Rushes–yards	42–186	30–17
Passing yards	180	324
Passing: comp–att–int	19–26–1	22–38–0
Turnovers		
Time of possession	30:04	29:56

Team	Category	Player	Statistics
Texas Tech	Passing	Behren Morton	19–26, 180 yards, 1 INT
Texas Tech	Rushing	Tahj Brooks	31 carries, 170 yards, 1 TD
Texas Tech	Receiving	Myles Price	10 receptions, 90 yards
Baylor	Passing	Blake Shapen	22–38, 324 yards, 1 TD
Baylor	Rushing	Dominic Richardson	9 carries, 26 yards
Baylor	Receiving	Monaray Baldwin	5 receptions, 126 yards

=== at Cincinnati ===
Baylor Bears (2–4) vs. Cincinnati Bearcats (2–4)

Quarter	1	2	3	4	Total
Baylor	3	17	9	3	32
Cincinnati	0	14	0	15	29

at Nippert Stadium • Cincinnati, OH

- Date: Saturday, October 21, 2023
- Game time: 12:00 p.m. EDT
- Game weather: sunny • Temperature: 52 °F (11 °C)
- Game attendance: 38,193
- Referee: Kevin Mar
- TV: ESPN+

Scoring summary

Quarter	Time	Drive			Team	Scoring information	Score	
Quarter	Time	Plays	Yards	TOP	Team	Scoring information	Baylor	Cincinnati
1st	05:55	4	-3	02:02	Baylor	54-yard field goal by Isaiah Hankins	3	0
2nd	14:55	14	75	06:00	Cincinnati	Xzavier Henderson 4-yard touchdown reception from Emory Jones, Carter Brown kick good	3	7
2nd	12:16	7	75	02:39	Baylor	Blake Shapen 3-yard touchdown run, Isaiah Hankins kick good	10	7
2nd	12:09				Baylor	Fumble recovery returned 15 yards for touchdown by Byron Vaughns, Isaiah Hankins kick good	17	7
2nd	07:18	8	47	02:44	Baylor	43-yard field goal by Isaiah Hankins	20	7
2nd	05:59	4	75	01:19	Cincinnati	Myles Montgomery 38-yard touchdown run, Carter Brown kick good	20	14
3rd	12:17	6	75	02:43	Baylor	Jake Roberts 6-yard touchdown reception from Blake Shapen, 2-point pass incomplete	26	14
3rd	05:00	9	56	04:34	Baylor	46-yard field goal by Isaiah Hankins	29	14
4th	14:20	12	62	05:32	Cincinnati	Myles Montgomery 1-yard touchdown run, Carter Brown kick good	29	21
4th	07:01	15	57	07:14	Baylor	43-yard field goal by Isaiah Hankins	32	21
4th	05:03	6	75	01:58	Cincinnati	Xzavier Henderson 29-yard touchdown reception from Emory Jones, 2-point pass to Evan Prater good	32	29
"TOP" = time of possession. For other American football terms, see Glossary of American football.							32	29

Statistics	Baylor	Cincinnati
First downs	22	21
Plays–yards	70–396	74–450
Rushes–yards	28–80	43–288
Passing yards	316	162
Passing: comp–att–int	25–42–0	19-31-0
Turnovers		
Time of possession	31:13	28:47

Team	Category	Player	Statistics
Baylor	Passing	Blake Shapen	25-42, 316 yards, 1 TD
Baylor	Rushing	Dominic Richardson	8 carries, 37 yards
Baylor	Receiving	Ketron Jackson, Jr.	5 receptions, 130 yards
Cincinnati	Passing	Emory Jones	19-30, 162 yards, 2 TD
Cincinnati	Rushing	Corey Kiner	15 carries, 129 yards
Cincinnati	Receiving	Xzavier Henderson	8 receptions, 82 yards, 2 TD

=== vs. Iowa State ===
Iowa State Cyclones (4–3) vs. Baylor Bears (3–4)

Quarter	1	2	3	4	Total
Iowa State	7	10	10	3	30
Baylor	0	6	6	6	18

at McLane Stadium • Waco, TX

- Date: Saturday, October 28, 2023
- Game time: 2:30 p.m. CDT
- Game weather: rain • Temperature: 71 °F (22 °C) • Wind: SW 8 MPH
- Game attendance: 43,528
- Referee: David Alvarez
- TV announcers (ESPN+): Mark Neely, Barrett Brooks

Scoring summary

Quarter	Time	Drive			Team	Scoring information	Score	
Quarter	Time	Plays	Yards	TOP	Team	Scoring information	Iowa State	Baylor
1st	11:56	4	55	01:37	Iowa State	Jayden Higgins 18-yard touchdown reception from Rocco Becht, Chase Contreraz kick good	7	0
2nd	12:39	9	42	04:07	Iowa State	42-yard field goal by Chase Contreraz	10	0
2nd	03:03	7	27	02:55	Iowa State	Cartevious Norton 1-yard touchdown run, Chase Contreraz kick good	17	0
2nd	00:44	7	40	01:00	Baylor	Dawson Pendergrass 8-yard touchdown run, Isaiah Hankins kick no good	17	6
3rd	11:15	7	73	03:45	Iowa State	Cartevious Norton 49-yard touchdown run, Chase Contreraz kick good	24	6
3rd	07:13	5	34	02:52	Iowa State	45-yard field goal by Chase Contreraz	27	6
3rd	05:49	4	75	01:24	Baylor	Monaray Baldwin 69-yard touchdown reception from Blake Shapen, 2-point run by Blake Shapen failed	27	6
4th	13:36	10	69	04:56	Baylor	Dawson Pendergrass 5-yard touchdown run, 2-point pass incomplete	27	18
4th	08:23	12	69	05:13	Iowa State	25-yard field goal by Chase Contreraz	30	18
"TOP" = time of possession. For other American football terms, see Glossary of American football.							30	18

Statistics	Iowa State	Baylor
First downs	19	17
Plays–yards	66–400	66–306
Rushes–yards	35–162	25–67
Passing yards	238	239
Passing: comp–att–int	19–31–1	24–41–1
Turnovers		
Time of possession	33:33	26:27

Team	Category	Player	Statistics
Iowa State	Passing	Rocco Becht	19–31, 238 yards, 1 TD, 1 INT
Iowa State	Rushing	Eli Sanders	14 carries, 90 yards
Iowa State	Receiving	Jaylin Noel	8 receptions, 76 yards
Baylor	Passing	Blake Shapen	24–41, 239 yards, 1 TD, 1 INT
Baylor	Rushing	Dawson Pendergrass	8 carries, 37 yards, 2 TD
Baylor	Receiving	Monaray Baldwin	6 receptions, 117 yards, 1 TD

=== vs. Houston ===
Houston Cougars (3–5) vs. Baylor Bears (3–5)

Quarter	1	2	3	4	OT	Total
Houston	0	7	3	7	8	25
Baylor	0	0	7	10	7	24

at McLane Stadium • Waco, TX

- Date: Saturday, November 4, 2023
- Game time: 2:30 p.m. CDT
- Game weather: sunny • Temperature: 73°F
- Game attendance: 41,180
- Referee: Derek Anderson
- TV: ESPN+

Scoring summary

Quarter	Time	Drive			Team	Scoring information	Score	
Quarter	Time	Plays	Yards	TOP	Team	Scoring information	Houston	Baylor
2nd	08:03	3	44	01:11	Houston	Samuel Brown 26-yard touchdown reception from Donovan Smith, Jack Martin kick good	7	0
3rd	06:16	14	67	08:44	Houston	31-yard field goal by Jack Martin	10	0
3rd	02:20	8	75	03:56	Baylor	Drake Dabney 38-yard touchdown reception from Blake Shapen, Isaiah Hankins kick good	10	7
4th	08:18	12	69	06:54	Baylor	27-yard field goal by Isaiah Hankins	10	10
4th	05:38	5	75	02:40	Houston	Tony Mathis Jr. 24-yard touchdown reception from Donovan Smith, Jack Martin kick good	17	10
4th	00:29	11	74	02:22	Baylor	Hawkins Polley 1-yard touchdown reception from Blake Shapen, Isaiah Hankins kick good	17	17
OT	–	4	25	–	Baylor	Dawson Pendergrass 1-yard touchdown run, Isaiah Hankins kick good	17	24
OT	–	7	40	–	Houston	Donovan Smith 1-yard touchdown run, 2-point run by Donovan Smith good	25	24
"TOP" = time of possession. For other American football terms, see Glossary of American football.							25	24

Statistics	Houston	Baylor
First downs	21	22
Plays–yards	59–366	72–413
Rushes–yards	32–130	35–150
Passing yards	236	263
Passing: comp–att–int	21–27–2	29–37–1
Turnovers		
Time of possession	26:39	33:21

Team	Category	Player	Statistics
Houston	Passing	Donovan Smith	21–27, 236 yards, 2 TD, 2 INT
Houston	Rushing	Donovan Smith	20 carries, 66 yards, 1 TD
Houston	Receiving	Samuel Brown	9 receptions, 86 yards, 1 TD
Baylor	Passing	Blake Shapen	29–37, 263 yards, 2 TD, 1 INT
Baylor	Rushing	Dominic Richardson	11 carries, 51 yards
Baylor	Receiving	Drake Dabney	4 receptions, 76 yards, 1 TD

=== vs. West Virginia ===
West Virginia Mountaineers (7–4) vs. Baylor Bears (3–8)

Quarter	1	2	3	4	Total
West Virginia	7	20	0	7	34
Baylor	0	14	14	3	31

at McLane Stadium • Waco, TX

- Date: Saturday, November 25, 2023
- Game time: 6:00 p.m. CST
- Game weather: rain • Temperature: 56 °F (13 °C) • Wind: SE 2 MPH (3 km/h)
- Game attendance: 36,200
- Referee: Tutashinda Salaam
- TV announcers (FS1): Alex Faust and Petros Papadakis

Scoring summary

Quarter	Time	Drive			Team	Scoring information	Score	
Quarter	Time	Plays	Yards	TOP	Team	Scoring information	West Virginia	Baylor
1st	05:55	3	90	01:24	West Virginia	Traylon Ray 30-yard touchdown reception from Garrett Greene, Michael Hayes kick good	7	0
2nd	14:10	9	64	04:24	West Virginia	38-yard field goal by Michael Hayes	10	0
2nd	13:55				Baylor	Kickoff returned 96 yards for touchdown by Richard Reese, Isaiah Hankins kick good	10	7
2nd	10:28	7	82	3:27	West Virginia	Garrett Greene 23-yard touchdown run, Michael Hayes kick good	17	7
2nd	10:16				Baylor	Kickoff returned 93 yards for touchdown by Richard Reese, Isaiah Hankins kick good	17	14
2nd	05:44	8	60	04:32	West Virginia	36-yard field goal by Michael Hayes	20	14
2nd	00:15	7	74	1:31	West Virginia	Garrett Greene 1-yard touchdown run, Michael Hayes kick good	27	14
3rd	10:57	7	77	04:03	Baylor	Ketron Jackson Jr. 38-yard touchdown reception from Sawyer Robertson, Isaiah Hankins kick good	27	21
3rd	05:45	6	51	2:50	Baylor	Dominic Richardson 2-yard touchdown run, Isaiah Hankins kick good	27	28
4th	12:58	12	63	05:49	Baylor	39-yard field goal by Isaiah Hankins	27	31
4th	00:23	6	80	00:51	West Virginia	Jaheim White 29-yard touchdown reception from Garrett Greene, Michael Hayes kick good	34	31
"TOP" = time of possession. For other American football terms, see Glossary of American football.							34	31

Statistics	West Virginia	Baylor
First downs	23	17
Plays–yards	59–519	62–334
Rushes–yards	37–250	37–119
Passing yards	269	215
Passing: comp–att–int	16–25–0	17–20–0
Turnovers		
Time of possession	28:55	31:05

Team	Category	Player	Statistics
West Virginia	Passing	Garrett Greene	16–25, 269 yards, 2 TD
West Virginia	Rushing	Jahiem White	17 carries, 133 yards
West Virginia	Receiving	Hudson Clement	4 receptions, 80 yards
Baylor	Passing	Sawyer Robertson	17–19, 215 yards, 1 TD
Baylor	Rushing	Richard Reese	6 carries, 42 yards
Baylor	Receiving	Ketron Jackson Jr.	3 receptions, 88 yards, 1 TD

== Personnel ==
=== Roster ===
2023 Baylor Bears Football
Quarterback: 12 Blake Shapen – (redshirt) junior (6'0, 206); 13 Sawyer Robertson – (redshirt) sophomore (6'4, 220); 15 RJ Martinez - junior (5'11, 213); 17 Cade Tessier – freshman (6'3, 217); 18 Brayson McHenry – (redshirt) freshman (5'11, 198); Running back: 21 Dominic Richardson – junior (6'1, 204); 23 Jordan Jenkins – (redshirt) sophomore (6'1, 217); 25 Jacoby Clarke – (redshirt) senior (5'10, 230); 29 Richard Reese – sophomore (5'9, 179); 30 Bryson Washington - freshman (6'0, 204); 35 Dawson Pendergrass - freshman (6'2, 212); Wide receiver: 11 Ketron Jackson Jr – junior (6'3, 208); 14 Armani Winfield – (redshirt) freshman (6'2, 200); 16 Hal Presley – junior (6'2, 196); 17 Jonah Burton - (redshirt) sophomore (5'10, 197); 18 Jordan Nabors – sophomore (5'11, 189); 19 Javon Gipson – (redshirt) sophomore (6'3, 213); 24 Landry Kinne – (redshirt) junior (6'0, 187); 34 Josh Cameron – (redshirt) sophomore (6'1, 215); 80 Monaray Baldwin – junior (5'9, 168); 81 Jonathan Davidson – (redshirt) junior (6'1, 208); 84 Cameron Bonner – (redshirt) sophomore (5'11, 186); 88 Micah Gifford - freshman (6'3, 203); Tight end: 43 Gavin Yates - junior (6'3, 230); 44 Mark Patton - (redshirt) junior (6'4, 253); 45 Hawkins Polley - freshman (6'3, 250); 49 Jonathan Steinhauer - freshman (6'6, 242); 82 Cody Mladenka - (redshirt) freshman (6'4, 242); 85 Matthew Klopfenstein - freshman (6'4, 246); 86 Jake Roberts - junior (6'5, 248); 87 Kelsey Johnson - sophomore (6'2, 248); 89 Drake Dabney - senior (6'5, 248); Placekicker: 96 Bryce Boland – (redshirt) junior (5'11, 172); 97 Hayden Arnold - freshman (5'8, 180); 98 Isaiah Hankins – (redshirt) sophomore (6'0, 192); 99 Jack Stone – sophomore (5'11, 197); Punter: 94 Palmer Williams – freshman (6'2, 183)	Offensive line: 50 Connor Heffernan – (redshirt) sophomore (6'3, 294); 53 Campbell Barrington - junior (6'6, 299); 54 Timothy Dawn – (redshirt) freshman (6'2, 306); 56 Clark Barrington - 5th year senior (6'5, 306); 57 Wes Tucker – freshman (6'5, 294); 58 Gavin Byers – senior (6'5, 318); 61 Cayden Tone - freshman (6'4, 272); 62 Ryan Lengyel – (redshirt) sophomore (6'5, 305); 65 Sean Thompkins – freshman (6'5, 290); 70 Bryce Simpson – (redshirt) freshman (6'5, 286); 71 MJ Ruhman – (redshirt) sophomore (6'4, 291); 72 Coleton Price – (redshirt) freshman (6'2, 305); 73 George Maile – (redshirt) freshman (6'3, 305); 74 Kaden Sieracki – (redshirt) freshman (6'8, 318); 75 Elijah Ellis – (redshirt) senior (6'6, 307); 76 Isaiah Robinson – freshman (6'6, 299); 77 Tate Williams – (redshirt) sophomore (6'4, 301); 79 Alvin Ebosele – (redshirt) freshman (6'6, 304); Defensive line: 9 TJ Franklin – 5th year senior (6'5, 269); 35 Jackie Marshall - (redshirt) sophomore (6'3, 265); 48 Treven Ma'ae - (redshirt) junior (6'5, 296); 50 Kaian Roberts-Day - (redshirt) freshman (6'3, 274); 54 David Marshall Jr – sophomore (6'0, 278); 57 Prince Ugoh – (redshirt) sophomore (6'1, 227); 59 Devonte Tezino – (redshirt) freshman (6'5, 286); 90 Brendan Bett – freshman (6'5, 290); 91 Trey Wilson - freshman (6'3, 259); 92 Trent Thomas - freshman (6'3, 237); 93 DK Kalu - freshman (6'4, 270); 94 BoChao Jin – (redshirt) junior (6'0, 277); 95 Gabe Hall – senior (6'6, 292); 96 Justin Sambu – 5th year senior (6'4, 284); 97 Cooper Lanz – (redshirt) sophomore (6'3, 273); 98 Jerrell Boykins Jr – (redshirt) sophomore (6'4, 330); 99 Tre Emory – (redshirt) freshman (6'2, 308); Long snapper: 26 Garrison Grimes – (redshirt) sophomore (6'2, 216); 93 Dylan Schaub – freshman (6'5, 226)	Linebacker: 2 Matt Jones – (redshirt) senior (6'3, 251); 32 Carmello Jones – (redshirt) freshman (6'1, 225); 36 Tyrone M. Brown – (redshirt) sophomore (5'11, 233); 40 Mike Smith Jr - 5th year senior (6'1, 231); 41 Brooks Miller – (redshirt) junior (6'1, 229); 42 Jeremy Evans – (redshirt) freshman (6'1, 216); 44 Josh White – (redshirt) junior (6'0, 215); 49 Trey Laurence – freshman (6'0, 209); 56 Braden Strauss – (redshirt) junior (5'11, 215); 58 Jaden Maronen – (redshirt) sophomore (5'10, 220); Outside linebacker: 45 Byron Vaughns – 5th year senior (6'4, 242); 46 Tony Anyanwu – junior (6'2, 243); 51 Kyler Jordan – (redshirt) freshman (6'1, 235); 52 Corey Kelly - freshman (6'3, 218); 55 Garmon Randolph – (redshirt) senior (6'7, 250); Cornerback: 13 Isaiah Dunson – sophomore (6'1, 186); 15 Carl Williams IV - freshman (6'1, 180); 19 Caden Jenkins - freshman (6'1, 173); 21 Chateau Reed – (redshirt) junior (6'2, 190); 22 Reggie Bush – (redshirt) freshman (6'0, 191); 25 LeVar Thornton Jr - freshman (6'3, 175); 27 Tevin Williams III – (redshirt) sophomore (6'0, 188); 34 MJ Artmore Jr - freshman (6'0, 191); 37 Tay'Shawn Wilson - freshman (5'9, 178); Safety: 7 Bryson Jackson – 7th year senior (6'2, 209); 12 Alfonzo Allen – sophomore (5'11, 194); 20 Devin Lemear – (redshirt) sophomore (5'11, 187); 24 Corey Gordon Jr. – (redshirt) freshman (6'2, 191); 28 Devin Bobby – sophomore (5'10, 186); 29 Romario Noel – (redshirt) sophomore (6'3, 210); 30 Michael Allen – (redshirt) freshman (5'7, 183); 33 DJ Coleman – freshman (6'0, 194); 38 Jacob Redding - freshman (6'0, 187); 39 Michael Mastrodicasa – (redshirt) sophomore (6'0, 196); 47 Caleb Parker – (redshirt) junior (5'11, 205)
