= Dawson Pendergrass =

American football player

No. 35 – Baylor Bears
- Position: Running back
- Class: Senior

Personal information
- Listed height: 6 ft 2 in (1.88 m)
- Listed weight: 234 lb (106 kg)

Career information
- High school: Mineola (Mineola, Texas)
- College: Baylor (2023–present)
- Stats at ESPN

Dawson Pendergrass is an American college football running back for the Baylor Bears.

== Early life ==
Pendergrass attended Mineola High School in Mineola, Texas. As a senior, he rushed for 3,184 yards and 38 touchdowns. A three-star recruit, Pendergrass committed to play college football at Baylor University.

== College career ==
Pendergrass earned playing time as a true freshman, totaling 79 carries for 338 yards and five touchdowns, while also recording 26 receptions for 199 yards and two touchdowns. His production increased as a sophomore, rushing for two touchdowns in the 2024 Texas Bowl. Pendergrass finished his sophomore season rushing for 671 yards and six touchdowns. Pendergrass would miss the 2025 season due to a foot injury he suffered during fall camp.

=== Statistics ===
College statistics
Season	Team	Games	Rushing				Receiving			
Season	Team	GP	Att	Yards	Avg	TD	Rec	Yards	Avg	TD
2023	Baylor	11	79	338	4.3	5	26	199	7.7	2
2024	Baylor	13	121	671	5.5	6	11	103	9.4	1
2025	Baylor	DNP								
2026	Baylor	1	25	88	3.5	0	2	11	5.5	0
Career		25	225	1,097	4.9	11	39	313	8.0	3
