= McLane Stadium =

Football stadium at Baylor University

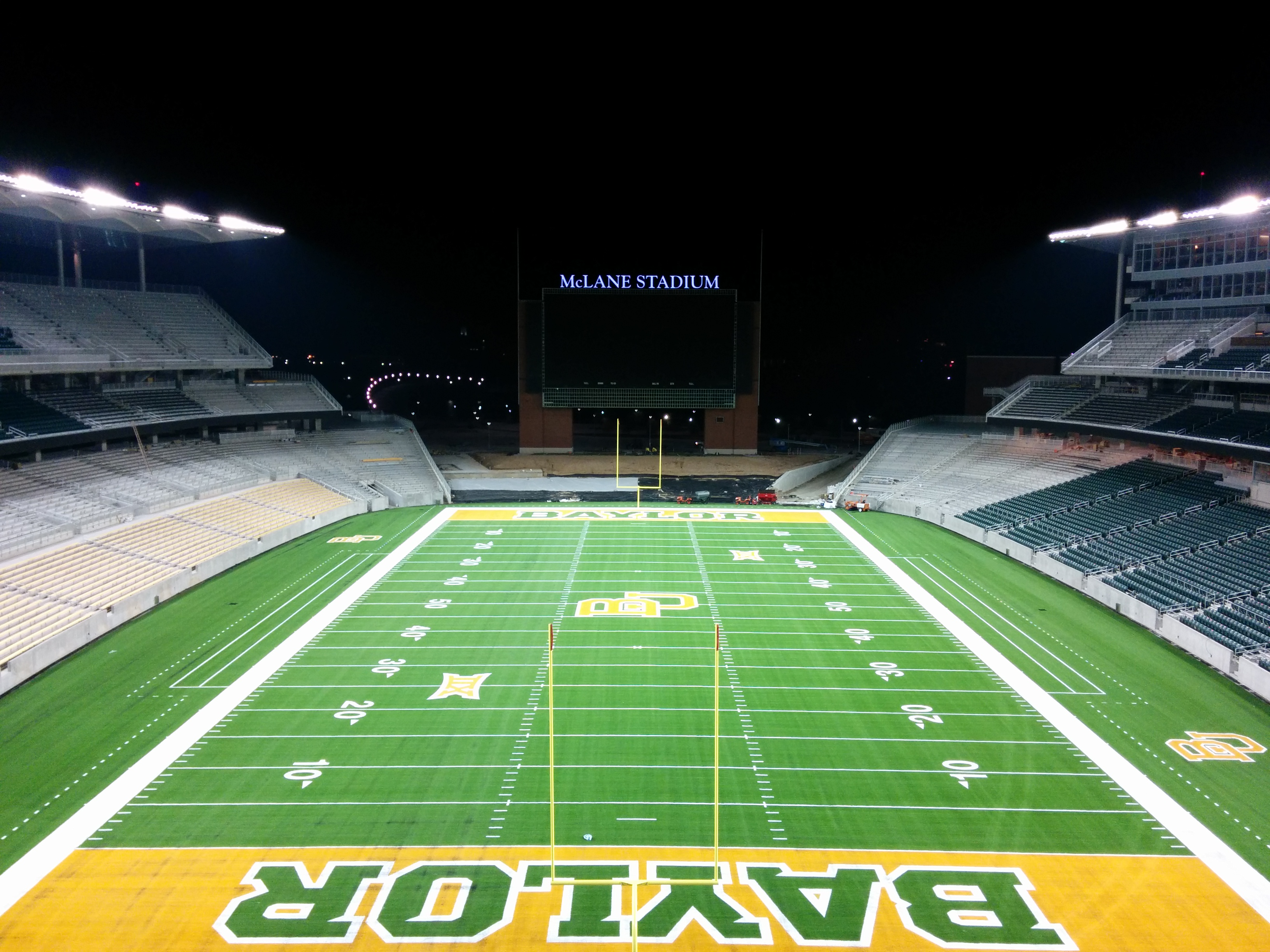
- McLane Stadium south end zone construction photo July 16, 2014

- Location in Texas Location in the United States
- Former names: Baylor Stadium (2013)
- Location: 1001 S M.L.K. Jr Blvd. Waco, Texas 76704
- Coordinates: 31.5582°N 97.1157°W
- Owner: Baylor University
- Operator: Baylor University
- Capacity: 45,140
- Surface: Matrix Turf (2014–present)

Construction
- Groundbreaking: September 15, 2012
- Opened: August 31, 2014; 12 years ago
- Cost: $266 million
- Architect: Populous
- Structural engineer: Buro Happold
- Services engineers: M-E Engineers, Inc.
- General contractor: Flintco/Austin Commercial

Tenant
- Baylor Bears (NCAA) (2014–present)

Website
- McLane Stadium

McLane Stadium is an American football stadium in Waco, Texas owned and operated by Baylor University. Originally named Baylor Stadium, the facility's name was changed to its current name in December 2013 to honor Baylor alumnus and business magnate Drayton McLane, Jr., who provided the lead gift in the fundraising campaign for the stadium construction. Baylor's first game at McLane was played August 31, 2014, with the Bears defeating SMU 45–0. The stadium has a capacity of 45,140 spectators and was designed to be expandable to a capacity of 55,000 as future needs require. McLane Stadium replaced Floyd Casey Stadium as the home field for the Baylor Bears football program.

== Events ==
The first college football game in McLane Stadium was a 45–0 Baylor win over SMU, in the 2014 season opener, on August 31, 2014. The Bears followed up their first victory with a 70-6 win over FCS opponent Northwestern State. With the first points from an opponent being from Northwestern State Kicker, Chris Moore.

In addition to sporting events, Baylor and the city of Waco plan to use the venue to host concerts and other community events such as The Gathering (a local gathering of churches on Palm Sunday). The stadium features the Baylor Club, a dining and event space located on the stadium's west side. The Baylor Club ballroom offers floor-to-ceiling windows overlooking the field and panoramic views of the Brazos River and Waco.

== Features ==
The stadium is located on the north bank of the Brazos River, one of a few major college football stadiums (along with Neyland Stadium, Husky Stadium and Acrisure Stadium) where fans can arrive at the stadium by boat. Fans can "sailgate" in the Baylor Basin, a cove that adjoins the stadium.

The stadium contains 39 suites, 74 loge boxes, 1,200 outdoor club seats, 3,000 seats for the Baylor Line student group, and 6,700 total student seats.

== Video board ==
The stadium includes a large high-definition LED video board behind the south end zone. The board has an area of 5,029 square feet, ranking it as the 13th largest college football video board in the nation as of April 2014.

McLane also features ribbon displays around the stadium's horseshoe configuration, measuring 1,254 feet in length. To complement the video board, Baylor released an in-game mobile app that enables fans to stream live footage, watch game replays from a variety of angles, and access current game statistics. To accommodate usage of the app, the stadium is outfitted with free Wi-Fi. The video board from Baylor's previous football stadium, Floyd Casey Stadium, was installed at the university's baseball field, Baylor Ballpark.

== Locker room ==
Baylor constructed a 7,500-square-foot home locker room. Designed as an oval in the shape of a football, the facilities feature over 120 cherry wood lockers. Additionally, the center of the room's ceiling features a large illuminated "BU" logo.

== Attendance records ==
=== Single game attendance ===
Rank	Attendance	Date	Opponent	Score	Event
1	50,223	November 16, 2019	Oklahoma	L, 34–31	ESPN College GameDay
2	49,875	November 14, 2015	Oklahoma	L, 44–34	ESPN College GameDay
3	49,165	September 23, 2023	Texas	L, 38–6	Final Big 12 game vs. UT
4	49,109	November 23, 2019	Texas	W, 24–10	Clinched Big 12 Championship Game berth
5	48,129	November 5, 2016	TCU	L, 62–22	
6	48,093	December 5, 2015	Texas	L, 23–17	
7	48,016	October 16, 2021	BYU	W, 38–24	Homecoming
8	47,979	October 1, 2022	Oklahoma State	L, 36–25	Big 12 championship game rematch
9	47,934	December 6, 2014	Kansas State	W, 38–27	ESPN College GameDay; clinched Big 12 title
10	47,686	November 12, 2022	Kansas State	L, 31–3	

=== Season average attendance ===
Rank	Avg. attendance	Season	Home Record	Total attendance
1	46,710	2014	6-0	280,257
2	46,160	2015	4-2	276,960
3	45,838	2016	4-2	275,029
4	45,517	2019	6-1	318,621
5	45,463	2022	3-3	272,779
6	44,729	2021	7-0	313,102
7	43,830	2017	0-6	262,978
8	43,681	2023	1-7	349,450
9	42,302	2024	5-1	253,810
10	41,336	2018	4-2	248,017
11	40,234	2025*	3-3	241,406
12	11,667	2020†	2-2	46,668
Totals	42,420	–	45-29 (.608)	3,139,077

† Limited to 25% capacity due to COVID-19 pandemic

* In progress

== Gallery ==
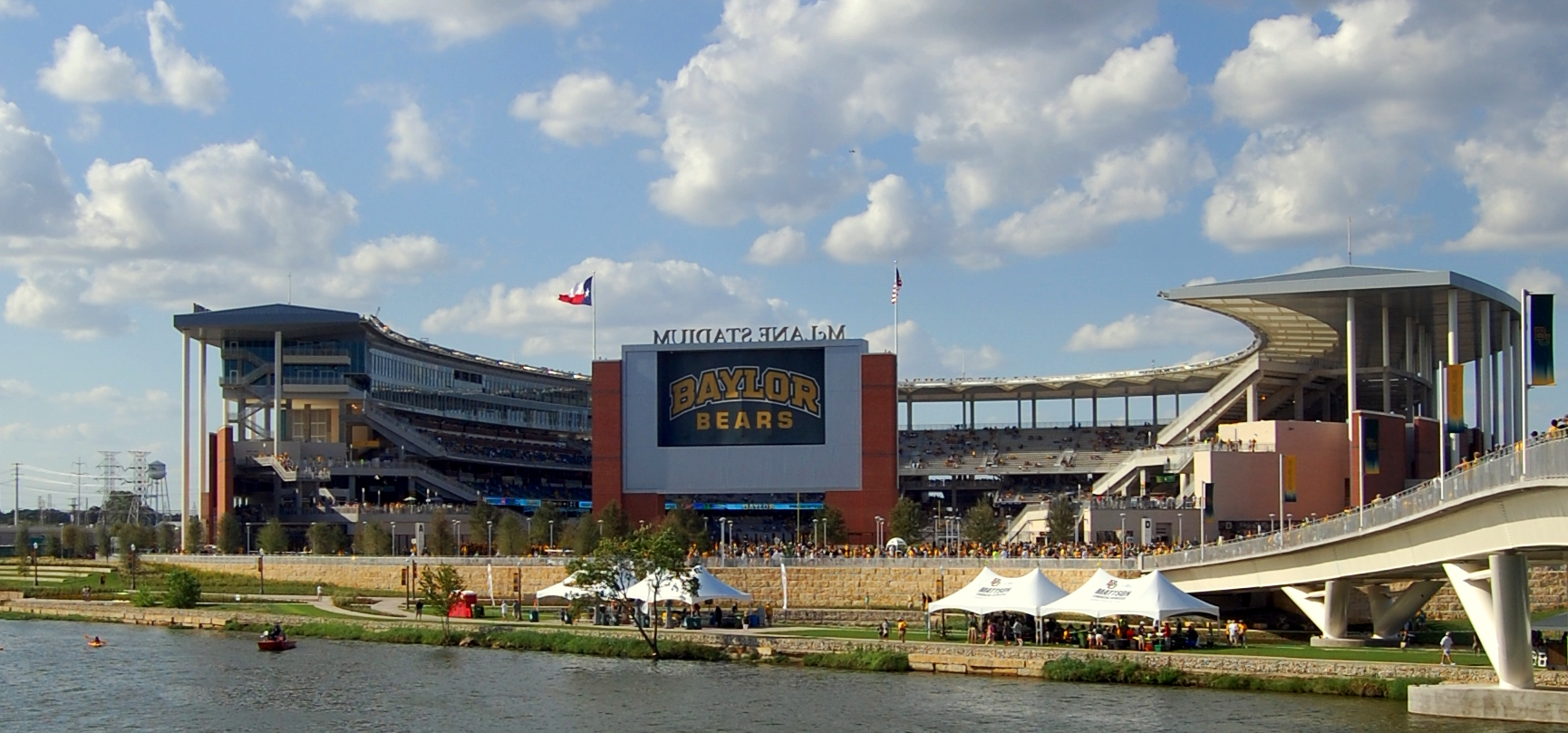
Inaugural game, 2014

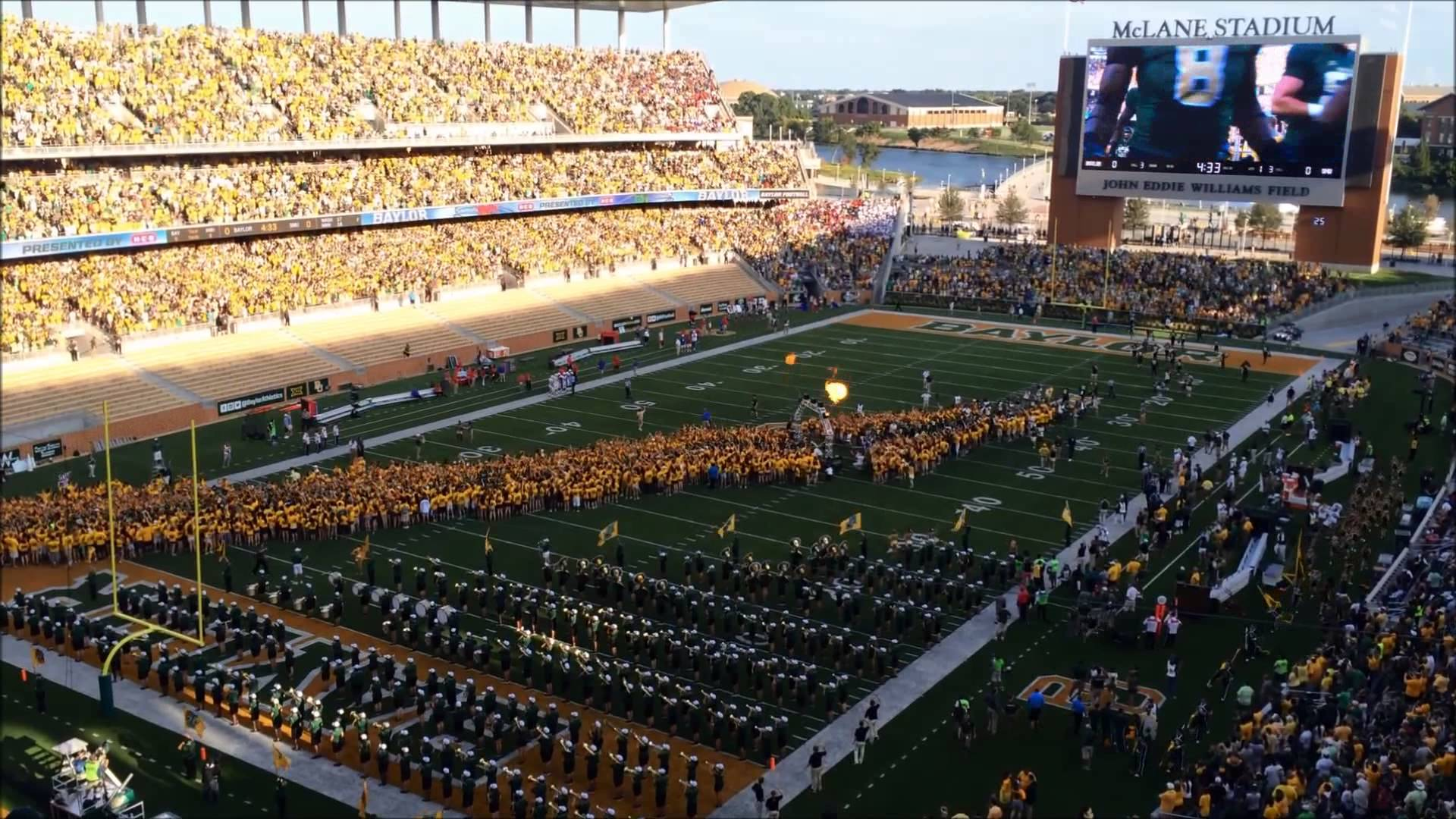
Football game in 2016

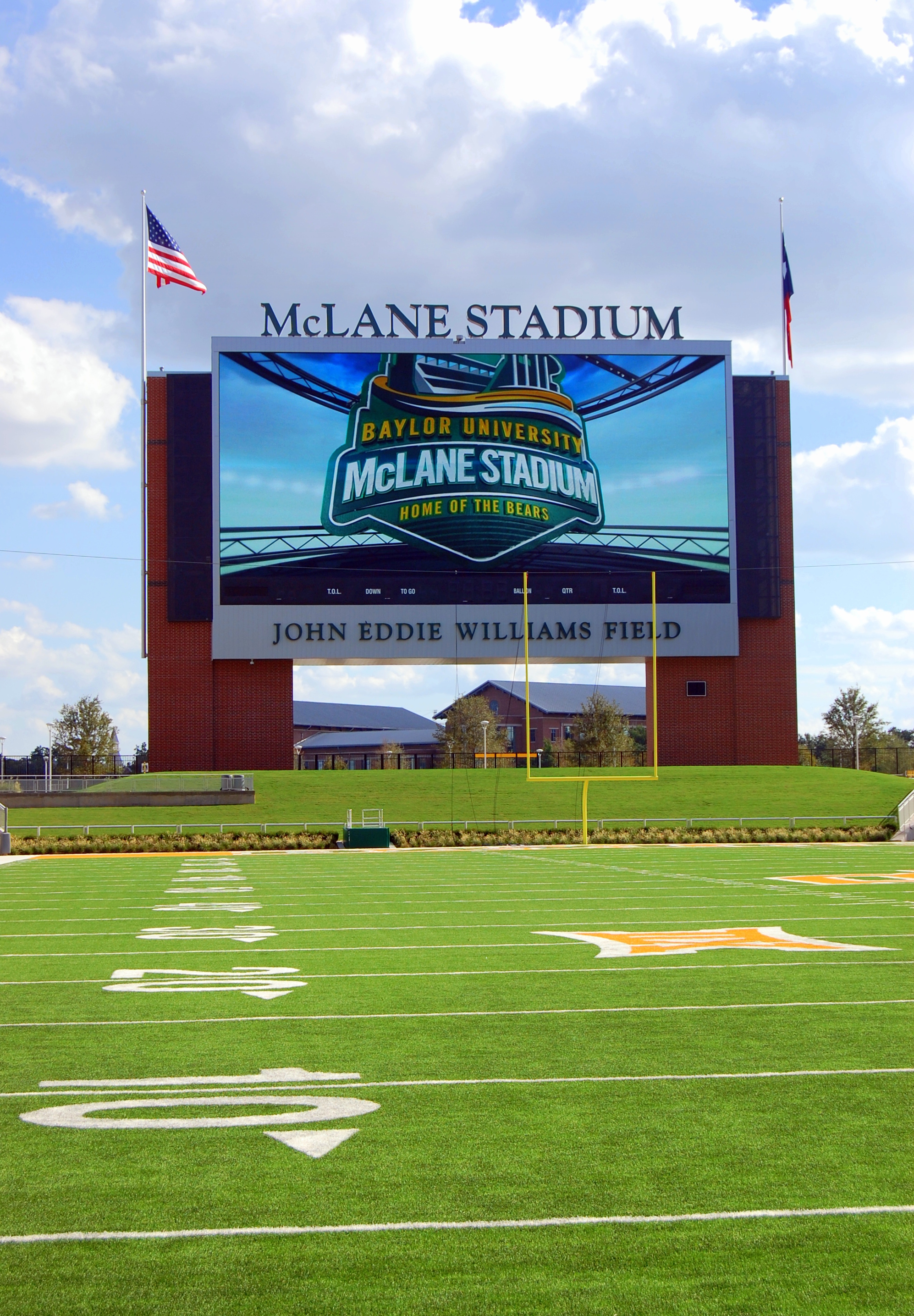
Video board

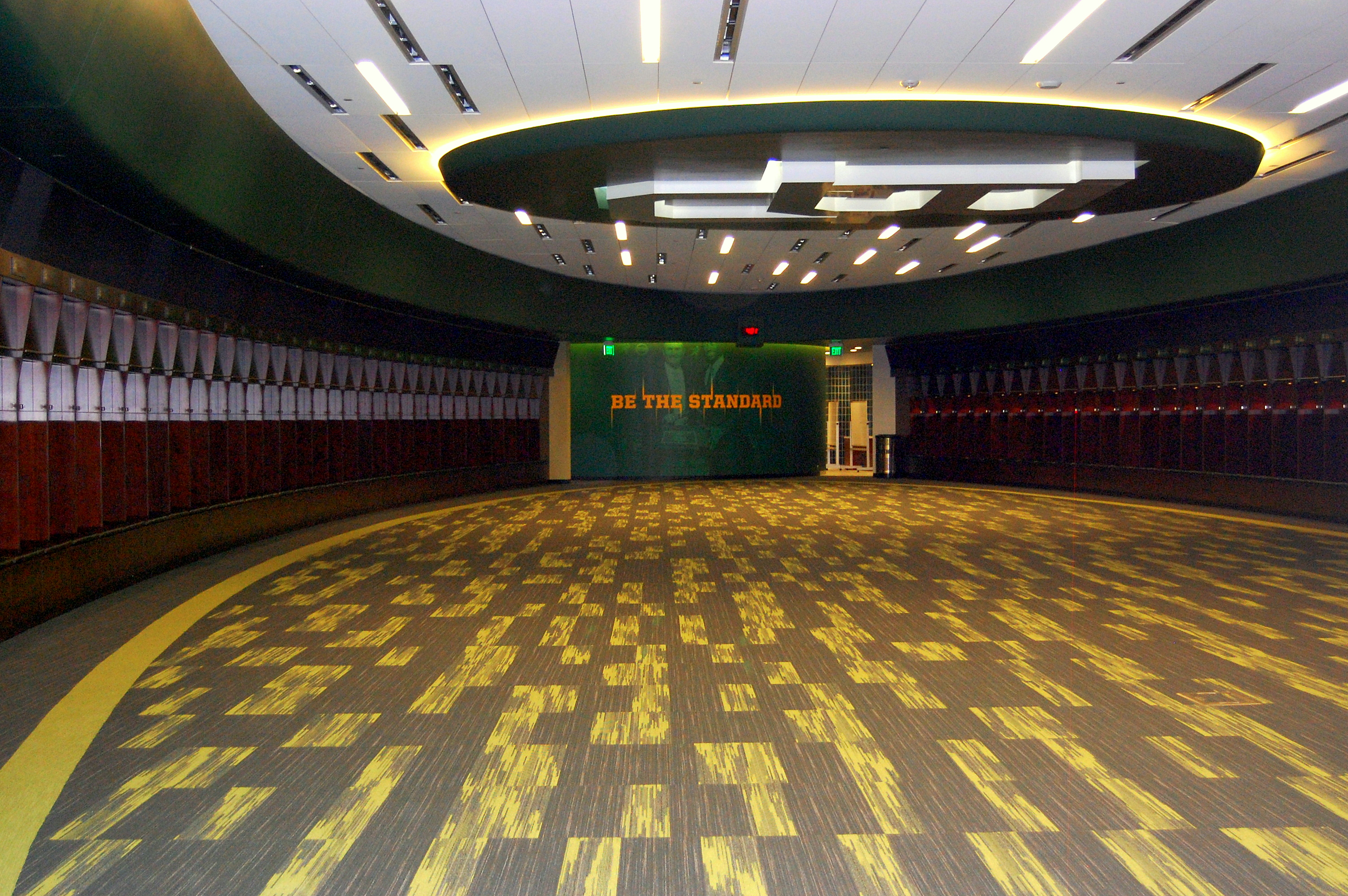
Locker room

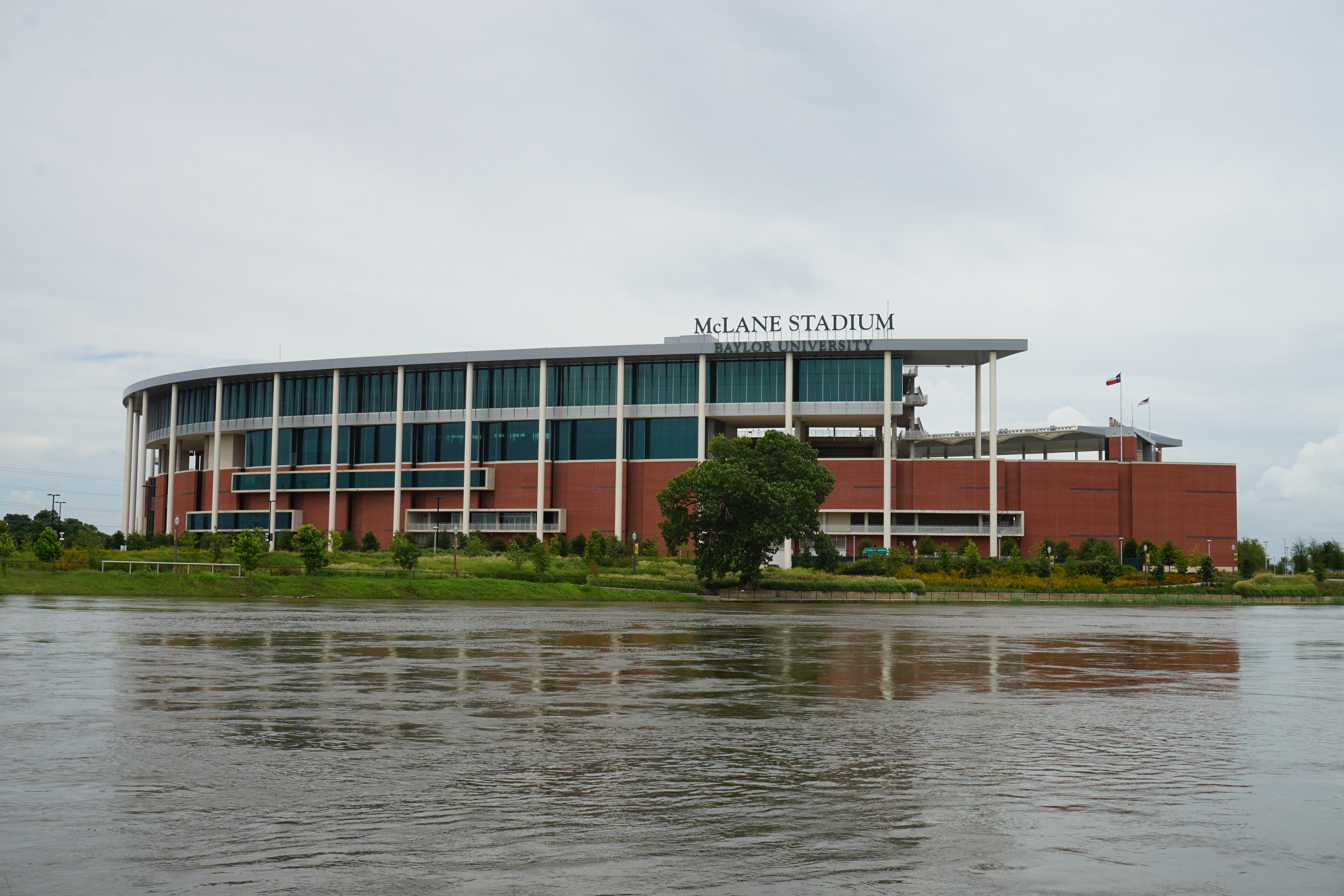
Exterior view

== See also ==
- List of NCAA Division I FBS football stadiums
