= Baylor–Texas Tech football rivalry =

American college football rivalry

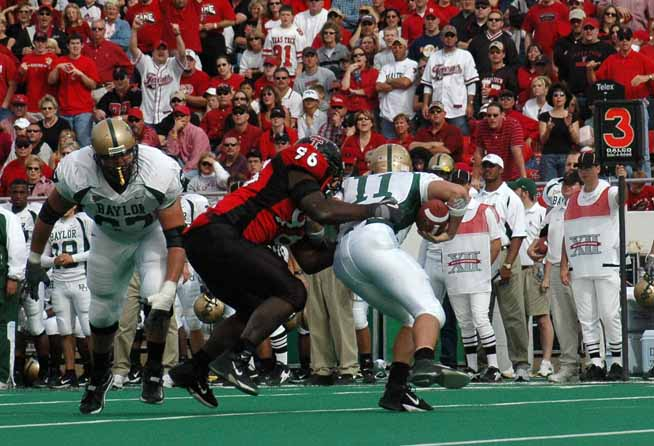
- A game between Baylor and Texas Tech in 2004.

- Baylor Bears Texas Tech Red Raiders
- First meeting: November 2, 1929; Baylor, 34–0
- Latest meeting: November 21, 2026; Texas Tech, 20–10
- Next meeting: 2027
- Stadiums: McLane Stadium Baylor and Jones AT&T Stadium Texas Tech

Statistics
- Total meetings: 84
- All-time series: Baylor leads 42–41–1
- Largest victory: Baylor: 34–0 (1929); Texas Tech: 62–11 (2002)
- Longest win streak: Texas Tech: 15 (1996–2010)
- Current win streak: Texas Tech: 1 (2026–present)

Locations of Baylor and Texas Tech

The Baylor–Texas Tech football rivalry is an American college football rivalry between the Baylor Bears and Texas Tech Red Raiders. Each school is a member of the Big 12 Conference. The rivalry began in 1929. The game has been played every year since 1956 despite the fact that Texas Tech was a member of the Border Intercollegiate Athletic Conference. In 1960, Texas Tech joined the Southwest Conference, ensuring the rivalry would continue. In 1996, the Southwest Conference dissolved, and both teams were invited, along with the Texas Longhorns and Texas A&M Aggies, with former members of the Big Eight Conference to form the Big 12 Conference. From 1947–64, Baylor won 14 of the 15 games. From 1996–2010, Texas Tech won 15 straight games. Baylor then won 5 straight meetings.

This rivalry has been nicknamed the "Texas Shootout" or some call it the "Butt Bowl" because whenever Baylor plays on the road or at a neutral site, the teams' abbreviated names read BU-TT.

== Texas Farm Bureau Insurance Shootout ==
In 2009, the game was held at AT&T Stadium (then Cowboy Stadium), the first time in the series the match-up was held on a neutral site. The game was the highest attended in the series' history, with 71,964 in attendance.

After the 2010 game was held at the Cotton Bowl in Fair Park, Dallas during the State Fair of Texas, the series returned to AT&T Stadium for the 2011 to 2017 games. The two schools finalized a contract that extended the series there through 2018. Starting in 2019 however, the series switched to campus sites, with Baylor hosting Texas Tech in 2019 in Waco and the Red Raiders hosting the Bears in 2020 in Lubbock. The series will remain on campus sites as there are no plans for any neutral site games.

== Game results ==
Baylor victories	Texas Tech victories	Tie games

No.	Date	Location	Winner	Score
1	November 2, 1929	Waco	Baylor	34–0
2	October 31, 1931	Waco	Baylor	32–0
3	November 11, 1932	Lubbock	Texas Tech	14–2
4	November 17, 1933	Lubbock	Texas Tech	13–0
5	October 5, 1934	Lubbock	Texas Tech	14–7
6	October 17, 1942	Lubbock	Baylor	14–7
7	October 20, 1945	Lubbock	Tie	7–7
8	October 19, 1946	Lubbock	Texas Tech	13–6
9	October 18, 1947	Lubbock	Baylor	32–6
10	October 16, 1948	Waco	#19 Baylor	13–0
11	October 15, 1949	Lubbock	#20 Baylor	28–7
12	October 21, 1950	Waco	Baylor	26–12
13	October 20, 1951	Waco	#10 Baylor	40–20
14	October 18, 1952	Lubbock	Baylor	21–10
15	September 29, 1956	Waco	Baylor	27–0
16	October 19, 1957	Lubbock	Baylor	15–12
17	October 18, 1958	Lubbock	Baylor	26–7
18	October 17, 1959	Waco	Baylor	14–7
19	October 15, 1960	Lubbock	#7 Baylor	14–7
20	October 21, 1961	Lubbock	Texas Tech	19–17
21	October 20, 1962	Waco	Baylor	28–6
22	October 19, 1963	Lubbock	Baylor	21–17
23	October 17, 1964	Waco	Baylor	28–10
24	November 13, 1965	Lubbock	Texas Tech	34–22
25	November 12, 1966	Lubbock	Baylor	29–14
26	November 18, 1967	Lubbock	Texas Tech	31–29
27	November 16, 1968	Waco	Baylor	42–28
28	November 15, 1969	Lubbock	Texas Tech	41–7
29	November 14, 1970	Waco	Texas Tech	7–3
30	November 13, 1971	Lubbock	Texas Tech	27–0
31	November 18, 1972	Waco	Texas Tech	13–7
32	November 17, 1973	Lubbock	#12 Texas Tech	55–24
33	November 16, 1974	Waco	Baylor	17–10
34	November 15, 1975	Lubbock	Texas Tech	33–10
35	December 4, 1976	Lubbock	#9 Texas Tech	24–21
36	September 10, 1977	Waco	#8 Texas Tech	17–7
37	November 4, 1978	Lubbock	Texas Tech	27–9
38	September 29, 1979	Waco	Baylor	27–17
39	September 27, 1980	Lubbock	Baylor	11–3
40	September 26, 1981	Waco	Baylor	28–15
41	September 25, 1982	Lubbock	Baylor	24–23
42	September 24, 1983	Waco	Texas Tech	26–11
43	September 29, 1984	Lubbock	Baylor	18–9

No.	Date	Location	Winner	Score
44	September 28, 1985	Waco	Baylor	31–0
45	September 27, 1986	Lubbock	#17 Baylor	45–14
46	September 26, 1987	Waco	Baylor	36–22
47	September 24, 1988	Lubbock	Texas Tech	36–6
48	September 30, 1989	Waco	Baylor	29–15
49	September 29, 1990	Lubbock	Baylor	21–15
50	November 16, 1991	Waco	Texas Tech	31–24
51	September 26, 1992	Lubbock	Texas Tech	36–17
52	September 25, 1993	Waco	Baylor	28–26
53	October 22, 1994	Lubbock	Texas Tech	38–7
54	September 30, 1995	Waco	Baylor	9–7
55	October 5, 1996	Lubbock	Texas Tech	45–24
56	October 4, 1997	Waco	Texas Tech	35–14
57	October 3, 1998	Lubbock	Texas Tech	31–29
58	October 23, 1999	Waco	Texas Tech	35–7
59	October 7, 2000	Lubbock	Texas Tech	28–0
60	October 27, 2001	Waco	Texas Tech	63–19
61	November 2, 2002	Lubbock	Texas Tech	62–11
62	November 8, 2003	Waco	Texas Tech	62–14
63	November 6, 2004	Lubbock	Texas Tech	42–17
64	October 29, 2005	Waco	#17 Texas Tech	28–0
65	November 4, 2006	Lubbock	Texas Tech	55–21
66	November 3, 2007	Waco	Texas Tech	38–7
67	November 29, 2008	Lubbock	#7 Texas Tech	35–28
68	November 28, 2009	Arlington	Texas Tech	20–13
69	October 9, 2010	Dallas	Texas Tech	45–38
70	November 26, 2011	Arlington	#21 Baylor	66–42
71	November 24, 2012	Arlington	Baylor	52–45
72	November 16, 2013	Arlington	#4 Baylor	63–34
73	November 29, 2014	Arlington	#5 Baylor	48–46
74	October 3, 2015	Arlington	#5 Baylor	63–35
75	November 25, 2016	Arlington	Texas Tech	54–35
76	November 11, 2017	Arlington	Texas Tech	38–24
77	November 24, 2018	Arlington	Baylor	35–24
78	October 12, 2019	Waco	#22 Baylor	33–30 ^{2OT}
79	November 14, 2020	Lubbock	Texas Tech	24–23
80	November 27, 2021	Waco	#8 Baylor	27–24
81	October 29, 2022	Lubbock	Baylor	45–17
82	October 7, 2023	Waco	Texas Tech	39–14
83	October 19, 2024	Lubbock	Baylor	59–35
84	November 21, 2026	Waco	#12 Texas Tech	20–10
Series: Baylor leads 42–41–1

== See also ==
- List of NCAA college football rivalry games
