= Monaray Baldwin =

American football player (born 2002)

Profile
- Position: Wide receiver

Personal information
- Born: December 17, 2002 (age 23); Killeen, Texas, U.S.
- Listed height: 5 ft 9 in (1.75 m)
- Listed weight: 170 lb (77 kg)

Career information
- High school: Shoemaker (Killeen, Texas)
- College: Baylor (2021–2024)
- NFL draft: 2025: undrafted

Career history
- Miami Dolphins (2025)*
- * Offseason or practice squad member only

Monaray Baldwin (born December 17, 2002) is an American professional football wide receiver. He played college football for the Baylor Bears.

== Early life ==
Baldwin attended Shoemaker High School in Killeen, Texas, and committed to play college football for the Baylor Bears.

== College career ==
As a freshman in 2021, Baldwin appeared in eight games, where he totaled one reception for seven yards, six carries for 87 yards and a touchdown, and two kick returns for 48 yards. In week 5 of the 2022 season, he hauled in seven passes for 174 yards and two touchdowns versus Oklahoma State. In 2022, Baldwin hauled in 33 receptions for 565 yards and four touchdowns. A team captain, he finished the 2023 season leading the Bears with 623 yards and four touchdowns. In 2024, Baldwin had 27 receptions for 478 yards and five touchdowns and declared for the 2025 NFL draft after the season.

== Professional career ==
Pre-draft measurables
Height	Weight	Arm length	Hand span	40-yard dash	10-yard split	20-yard split	20-yard shuttle	Three-cone drill	Vertical jump	Broad jump	Bench press
5 ft 8 3/4 in (1.75 m)	166 lb (75 kg)	28 1/8 in (0.71 m)	8 5/8 in (0.22 m)	4.32 s	1.50 s	2.52 s	4.47 s	7.08 s	34.0 in (0.86 m)	9 ft 11 in (3.02 m)	10 reps
All values from Pro Day

=== Miami Dolphins ===
On May 9, 2025, Baldwin signed with the Miami Dolphins as an undrafted free agent after going unselected in the 2025 NFL draft. He was waived on August 11.

=== Houston Gamblers ===
On January 13, 2026, Baldwin was selected by the Houston Gamblers in the 2026 UFL Draft.
