= Richard Reese =

American football player (born 2004)

No. 29 – Stephen F. Austin Lumberjacks
- Position: Running back
- Class: Senior

Personal information
- Born: October 24, 2004 (age 22); Bellville, Texas, U.S.
- Listed height: 5 ft 11 in (1.80 m)
- Listed weight: 175 lb (79 kg)

Career information
- High school: Bellville
- College: Baylor (2022–2024); Stephen F. Austin (2025–present)

Awards and highlights
- Freshman All-American (2022); Big 12 Offensive Freshman of the Year (2022)
- Stats at ESPN

Richard Reese (born October 24, 2004) is an American college football running back for the Stephen F. Austin Lumberjacks. He previously played for the Baylor Bears.

== Early life ==
Reese attended Bellville High School in Bellville, Texas, where he played on the football team and ran track and field. In his high school career he rushed for 6,678 yards and 85 touchdowns on 726 carries and was a three-time District Offensive MVP. On March 13, 2021, Reese committed to Baylor to play football.

== College career ==
=== Baylor ===
As a freshman in 2022, Reese rushed for 972 yards and 14 touchdowns on 198 carries and caught 13 passes for 89 yards. In week 3 against Texas State, he rushed for 156 yards and three touchdowns on 19 carries, earning Big 12 Newcomer of the Week honors. Reese was named the Big 12 Newcomer of the Week for a second time in week 9 win against Texas Tech after rushing for 148 yards and three touchdowns on a career-high 36 carries. After the season he was named the Big 12 Offensive Freshman of the Year and a Freshman All American by FWAA, as well as a semifinalist for the Shuan Alexander freshman of the year award.

On April 16, 2025, Reese announced that he would enter the transfer portal.

=== Stephen F. Austin ===
On April 18, 2025, Reese announced that he would transfer to Stephen F. Austin.
