= Jackie Marshall (American football) =

American football player (born 2003)

No. 96 – Tennessee Titans
- Position: Defensive tackle
- Roster status: Active

Personal information
- Born: April 26, 2003 (age 23); Baltimore, Maryland, U.S.
- Listed height: 6 ft 2 in (1.88 m)
- Listed weight: 293 lb (133 kg)

Career information
- High school: East St. John (Reserve, Louisiana)
- College: Baylor (2021–2025)
- NFL draft: 2026: 6th round, 184th overall pick

Career history
- Tennessee Titans (2026–present)
- Stats at Pro Football Reference

Jackie Marshall (born April 26, 2003) is an American professional football defensive tackle for the Tennessee Titans of the National Football League (NFL). He played college football for the Baylor Bears and was selected by the Titans in the sixth round of the 2026 NFL draft.

== Early life ==
Marshall was born on April 26, 2003, in Baltimore, Maryland. Marshall attended East St. John High School in Reserve, Louisiana, and committed to play college football for the Baylor Bears.

== College career ==
During his five-year career at Baylor from 2021 through 2025, Marshall played in 37 games with 24 starts, totaling 94 tackles with 13 being for a loss, and five sacks, earning honorable-mention All-Big 12 honors in 2024 and 2025.

== Professional career ==
Pre-draft measurables
Height	Weight	Arm length	Hand span	Wingspan	40-yard dash	10-yard split	20-yard split	20-yard shuttle
6 ft 2 1/2 in (1.89 m)	293 lb (133 kg)	32 in (0.81 m)	9 1/2 in (0.24 m)	6 ft 5 3/4 in (1.97 m)	4.88 s	1.69 s	2.82 s	4.68 s
All values from NFL Combine

Marshall was selected by the Tennessee Titans in the sixth round with the 184th overall pick of the 2026 NFL draft.
