= Josh Cameron (American football) =

American football player (born 2003)

No. 19 – Jacksonville Jaguars
- Position: Wide receiver
- Roster status: Active

Personal information
- Born: March 18, 2003 (age 23)
- Listed height: 6 ft 1 in (1.85 m)
- Listed weight: 224 lb (102 kg)

Career information
- High school: Cedar Park (Cedar Park, Texas)
- College: Baylor (2021–2025)
- NFL draft: 2026: 6th round, 191st overall pick

Career history
- Jacksonville Jaguars (2026–present)

Awards and highlights
- 2× First-team All-Big 12 (2024, 2025)

Career NFL statistics as of Week 7, 2026
- Receptions: 8
- Receiving yards: 117
- Receiving touchdowns: 2
- Stats at Pro Football Reference

Josh Cameron (born March 18, 2003) is an American professional football wide receiver for the Jacksonville Jaguars of the National Football League (NFL). He played college football for the Baylor Bears and was selected by the Jaguars in the sixth round of the 2026 NFL draft.

== Early life ==
Cameron attended and played football at Cedar Park High School in Cedar Park, Texas. He had 80 receptions for 1,127 yards and 14 touchdowns his junior year and 90 receptions for 1,226 yards and 14 touchdowns his senior year.

== College career ==
Cameron joined Baylor University as a walk-on in 2021. He played in three games that year and took a redshirt. He started four of 13 games and had 28 receptions for 386 yards his redshirt freshman in 2022 and started seven of 12 games, recording 21 receptions for 224 yards redshirt sophomore in 2023. As a redshirt junior in 2024, Cameron started all 13 games and led the team with 52 receptions for 754 yards and 10 touchdowns. He also served as the teams punt returner and was named a second team All-American.

== Professional career ==
Pre-draft measurables
Height	Weight	Arm length	Hand span	Wingspan
6 ft 1 1/2 in (1.87 m)	220 lb (100 kg)	33 1/8 in (0.84 m)	10 1/4 in (0.26 m)	6 ft 9 in (2.06 m)
All values from NFL Combine

Cameron was selected by the Jacksonville Jaguars in the sixth round with the 191st overall pick of the 2026 NFL draft. In Jacksonville's season–opening victory over the Cleveland Browns, Cameron recorded his first career touchdown on a four–yard reception from Trevor Lawrence.
