= Drake Dabney =

American football player (born 2002)

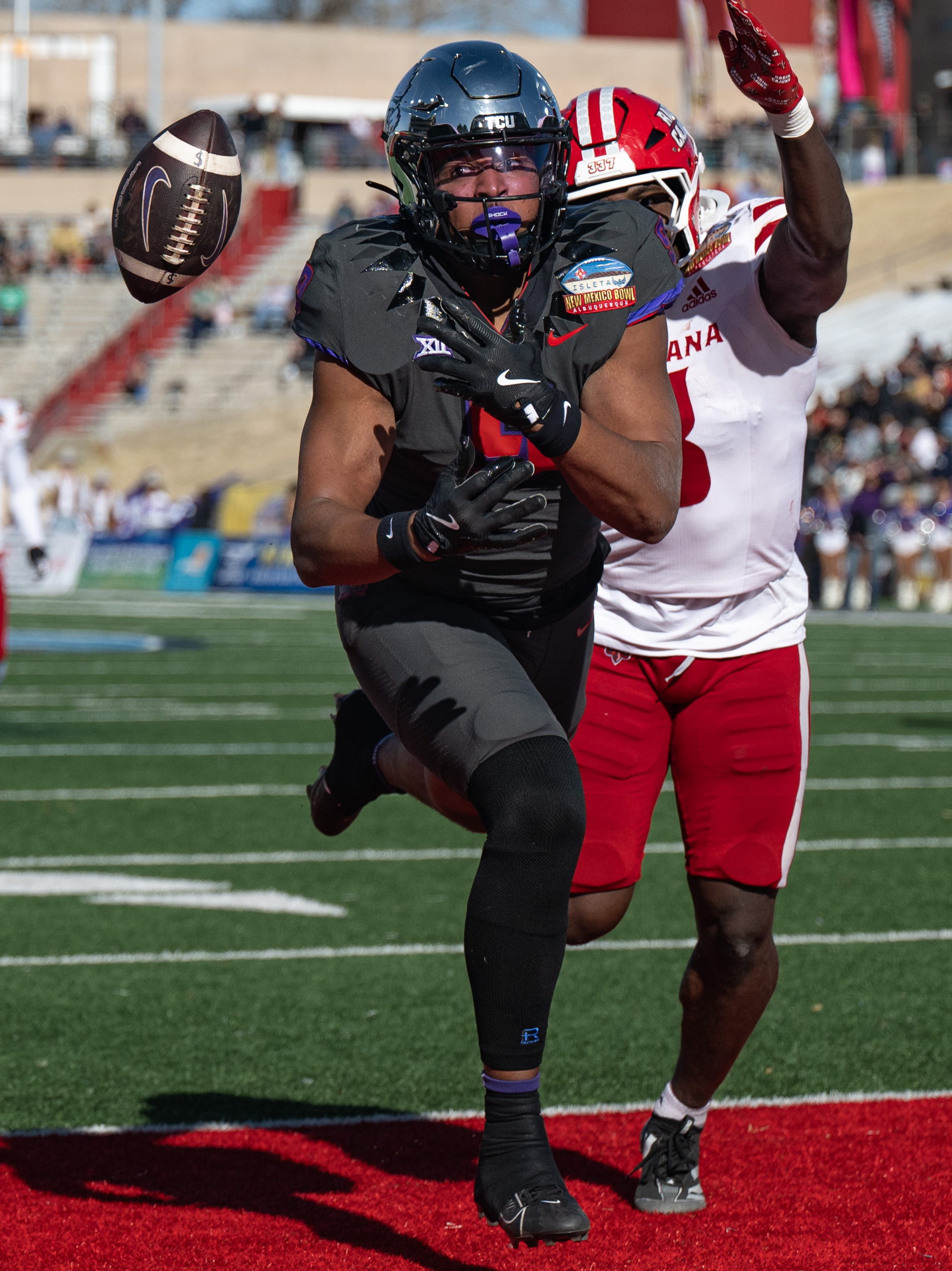
- Dabney with TCU in 2024

No. 49 – Green Bay Packers
- Position: Tight end
- Roster status: Practice squad

Personal information
- Born: May 14, 2002 (age 24); Cypress, Texas, U.S.
- Listed height: 6 ft 5 in (1.96 m)
- Listed weight: 246 lb (112 kg)

Career information
- High school: Cypress Ranch
- College: Baylor (2020–2023); TCU (2024)
- NFL draft: 2025: undrafted

Career history
- Tennessee Titans (2025)*; Green Bay Packers (2025–present)
- * Offseason or practice squad member only

Career NFL statistics as of Week 10, 2026
- Receptions: 1
- Receiving yards: 3
- Stats at Pro Football Reference

Drake Dabney (born May 14, 2002) is an American professional football tight end for the Green Bay Packers of the National Football League (NFL). He played college football for the Baylor Bears and TCU Horned Frogs.

== Early life and college career ==
Dabney was born on May 14, 2002, and grew up in Cypress, Texas. He attended Cypress Ranch High School where he played football as a tight end and was one of his team's top receivers. He twice earned all-district honors and posted 35 catches for 476 yards and seven touchdowns as a senior. A three-star recruit, Dabney initially committed to play college football for the Arizona Wildcats. He later changed his commitment to the Baylor Bears.

Dabney caught six passes for 57 yards in six games as a true freshman in 2020, then recorded 10 receptions for 91 yards and two touchdowns while starting eight games for the Bears in 2021. He had 16 catches for 173 yards in 2022 before suffering a broken fibula, which ended his season. He opened the 2023 season with 101 receiving yards against Texas State, the best game for a Baylor tight end in 59 years. In total, he started nine games for the 2023 Bears, setting the school record for a tight end with 552 receiving yards while also having 33 receptions and five receiving touchdowns, earning honorable mention All-Big 12 Conference honors. Dabney transferred to the TCU Horned Frogs for his final season in 2024. He recorded 19 catches for 193 yards in his lone year there.

== Professional career ==
Pre-draft measurables
Height	Weight	Arm length	Hand span	Wingspan	40-yard dash	10-yard split	20-yard split	20-yard shuttle	Three-cone drill	Vertical jump	Broad jump	Bench press
6 ft 4 5/8 in (1.95 m)	246 lb (112 kg)	33 5/8 in (0.85 m)	9 5/8 in (0.24 m)	6 ft 9 5/8 in (2.07 m)	4.79 s	1.66 s	2.75 s	4.54 s	7.44 s	34.0 in (0.86 m)	9 ft 5 in (2.87 m)	13 reps
All values from Pro Day

=== Tennessee Titans ===
After going unselected in the 2025 NFL draft, Dabney signed with the Tennessee Titans as an undrafted free agent, following a rookie minicamp tryout. He was waived on August 26, 2025, as a part of the team's final roster cuts. Dabney was subsequently re-signed to the team's practice squad on September 1. He was released by the Titans on September 15.

=== Green Bay Packers ===
On November 4, 2025, Dabney signed with the practice squad of the Green Bay Packers. Dabney was elevated to the active roster for the team's Week 17 and 18 games. He signed a reserve/future contract with Green Bay on January 12, 2026.

On August 30, 2026, Dabney was released by the Packers as a part of final roster cuts. A day later, he was re–signed to the Packers' practice squad. He was elevated to the active squad for Week 9 and 10.

== NFL career statistics ==
=== Regular season ===
Year	Team	Games		Receiving					Fumbles	
Year	Team	GP	GS	Rec	Yds	Y/R	Lng	TD	Fum	Lost
2025	GB	2	1	1	3	3.0	3	0	0	0
Career		2	1	1	3	3.0	3	0	0	0
Source: pro-football-reference.com
