= Matt Powledge =

American football player and coach (born 1987)

Current position
- Title: Defensive coordinator
- Team: North Texas
- Conference: American

Biographical details
- Born: March 31, 1987 (age 39); Huntsville, Texas, U.S.

Playing career
- 2005–2009: Sam Houston State
- Position: Fullback

Coaching career (HC unless noted)
- 2010: Southeastern Louisiana (GA)
- 2011: Southeastern Louisiana (TE)
- 2012: Northwestern State (RB)
- 2013: Kentucky (GA)
- 2014–2015: Sam Houston State (STC/RB)
- 2016–2017: Louisiana–Monroe (STC/TE)
- 2018–2019: Louisiana (STC/OLB)
- 2020–2021: Baylor (STC/S)
- 2022: Oregon (co-DC)
- 2023–2025: Baylor (DC/S)
- 2026–present: North Texas (DC)

Matthew Powledge (born March 31, 1987) is an American college football coach and former player who is currently the defensive coordinator for North Texas. He previously served as the defensive coordinator for Baylor from 2023 to 2025.

Powledge played college football at Sam Houston State University as a fullback from 2005 to 2009. Prior to his tenure at Oregon, he held various assistant coaching positions at Southeastern Louisiana University, Northwestern State University, the University of Kentucky, Sam Houston State University, the University of Louisiana–Monroe and Baylor University.

== Early life and education ==
A native of Huntsville, Texas, Powledge played fullback at Sam Houston State University from 2005 to 2009 and was an all-Southland honoree as a junior and a team captain as a senior. Powledge earned his bachelor's degree at Sam Houston State University in kinesiology in 2009 and his master's degree in sports management at Southeastern Louisiana University in 2011.

== Coaching career ==
In 2010, Powledge began his coaching career as a graduate assistant at Southeastern Louisiana University under head coach Mike Lucas. In 2011, Powledge was promoted to tight ends coach.

In 2012, Powledge was hired by Northwestern State University as their running backs coach.

In 2013, Powledge joined the University of Kentucky as a graduate assistant under head coach Mark Stoops.

In 2014, Powledge returned to his alma mater Sam Houston State University as their special teams coordinator and running backs coach.

In 2016, Powledge joined the University of Louisiana–Monroe (ULM) as their special teams coordinator and tight ends coach.

In 2018, Powledge was hired as the special teams coordinator and outside linebackers coach at the University of Louisiana at Lafayette under head coach Billy Napier.

On February 11, 2020, Powledge joined Baylor University as their special teams coordinator and safeties coach under head coach Dave Aranda.

On December 17, 2021, Powledge was hired as the co-defensive coordinator at the University of Oregon under head coach Dan Lanning.

On December 29, 2022, Powledge was hired as the defensive coordinator at Baylor University.
