= 2025 Mississippi State Bulldogs football team =

American college football season

2025 Mississippi State Bulldogs football

Duke's Mayo Bowl, L 29–43 vs. Wake Forest
- Conference: Southeastern Conference
- Record: 5–8 (1–7 SEC)
- Head coach: Jeff Lebby (2nd season)
- Offensive scheme: Veer and shoot
- Defensive coordinator: Coleman Hutzler (2nd season)
- Co-defensive coordinator: Matt Barnes (2nd season)
- Base defense: 3–4
- Home stadium: Davis Wade Stadium

2025 Southeastern Conference football standings
	Conf.			Overall
Team	W		L	W		L
No. 9 Alabama y^	7	–	1	11	–	4
No. 6 Georgia y$^	7	–	1	12	–	2
No. 3 Ole Miss ^	7	–	1	13	–	2
No. 8 Texas A&M ^	7	–	1	11	–	2
No. 13 Oklahoma ^	6	–	2	10	–	3
No. 12 Texas	6	–	2	10	–	3
No. 15 Vanderbilt	6	–	2	10	–	3
Missouri	4	–	4	8	–	5
Tennessee	4	–	4	8	–	5
LSU	3	–	5	7	–	6
Kentucky	2	–	6	5	–	7
Florida	2	–	6	4	–	8
Auburn	1	–	7	5	–	7
Mississippi State	1	–	7	5	–	8
South Carolina	1	–	7	4	–	8
Arkansas	0	–	8	2	–	10
Championship: Georgia 28, Alabama 7
^ – College Football Playoff participant; $ – Conference champion; y – Championship game participant; Rankings from AP Poll

The 2025 Mississippi State Bulldogs football team represented Mississippi State University in the Southeastern Conference (SEC) during the 2025 NCAA Division I FBS football season. The Bulldogs were led by second-year head coach Jeff Lebby. The team played its home games at Davis Wade Stadium located in Starkville.

The team managed to improve upon its 2–10 record of the previous season with their win in Week 3 over Alcorn State, as well as a 4–0 start, their first since 2014, including an upset win over then No. 12 Arizona State. The team also snapped a 16–game losing streak in SEC play dating back to 2023 with a win over Arkansas. Despite a promising 4–0 start, the team instead floundered to a 1–7 record in SEC play.

The Mississippi State Bulldogs drew an average home attendance of 53,186, the 38th-highest of all college football teams.

== Schedule ==
Date	Time	Opponent	Site	TV	Result	Attendance
August 30, 2025	11:00 a.m.	at Southern Miss*	M. M. Roberts Stadium; Hattiesburg, MS	ESPN	W 34–17	33,485
September 6	6:30 p.m.	No. 12 Arizona State*	Davis Wade Stadium; Starkville, MS	ESPN2	W 24–20	50,808
September 13	5:00 p.m.	Alcorn State*	Davis Wade Stadium; Starkville, MS	SECN+/ESPN+	W 63–0	49,158
September 20	3:15 p.m.	Northern Illinois*	Davis Wade Stadium; Starkville, MS	SECN	W 38–10	45,803
September 27	3:15 p.m.	No. 15 Tennessee	Davis Wade Stadium; Starkville, MS	SECN	L 34–41 ^{OT}	60,417
October 4	6:30 p.m.	at No. 6 Texas A&M	Kyle Field; College Station, TX	SECN	L 9–31	108,572
October 18	3:15 p.m.	at Florida	Ben Hill Griffin Stadium; Gainesville, FL	SECN	L 21–23	90,203
October 25	3:15 p.m.	No. 22 Texas^{†}	Davis Wade Stadium; Starkville, MS	SECN	L 38–45 ^{OT}	52,680
November 1	3:00 p.m.	at Arkansas	Donald W. Reynolds Razorback Stadium; Fayetteville, AR	SECN	W 38–35	68,358
November 8	11:00 a.m.	No. 5 Georgia	Davis Wade Stadium; Starkville, MS (SEC Nation)	ESPN	L 21–41	53,017
November 15	6:45 p.m.	at Missouri	Faurot Field; Columbia, MO	SECN	L 27–49	57,321
November 28	11:00 a.m.	No. 7 Ole Miss	Davis Wade Stadium; Starkville, MS (Egg Bowl)	ABC	L 19–38	60,417
January 2, 2026	7:00 p.m.	vs. Wake Forest*	Bank of America Stadium; Charlotte, NC (Duke's Mayo Bowl)	ESPN	L 29–43	29,328
*Non-conference game; ^{†}Homecoming; Rankings from AP Poll (and CFP Rankings, after November 4) - Released prior to game; All times are in Central time

== Game summaries ==
=== at Southern Miss ===
Mississippi State Bulldogs (0–0) at Southern Miss Golden Eagles (0–0) – Game summary

Quarter	1	2	3	4	Total
Bulldogs	10	3	21	0	34
Golden Eagles	3	7	0	7	17

at M. M. Roberts Stadium • Hattiesburg, Mississippi

- Date: August 30
- Game time: 11:00 a.m.
- Game weather: Cloudy, 74 °F (23 °C)
- Game attendance: 33,485
- Referee: James Carter
- TV announcers (ESPN): Roy Philpott (play-by-play), Sam Acho (analyst), and Taylor Davis (sidelines)

Game information

First quarter

- (13:35) Mississippi State - Seydou Traore 55-yard pass from Blake Shapen (Kyle Ferrie kick), (Drive: 6 plays, 75 yards, 1:25; Mississippi State 7-0)
- (7:54) Southern Miss - Reed Harradine 43-yard field goal, (Drive: 4 plays, 1 yard, 0:38; Mississippi State 7-3)
- (3:35) Mississippi State - Kyle Ferrie 55-yard field goal, (Drive: 10 plays, 38 yards, 4:19; Mississippi State 10-3)

Second quarter

- (13:35) Southern Miss - Micah Davis 3-yard pass from Braylon Braxton (Reed Harradine kick), (Drive: 12 plays, 81 yards, 4:25; Tied 10-10)
- (0:03) Mississippi State - Kyle Ferrie 30-yard field goal, (Drive: 15 plays, 63 yards, 5:56; Mississippi State 13-10)

Third quarter

- (9:34) Mississippi State - Fluff Bothwell 6-yard run, (Kyle Ferrie kick) (Drive: 8 plays, 66 yards, 3:10; Mississippi State 20-10)
- (4:57) Mississippi State - Fluff Bothwell 1-yard run, (Kyle Ferrie kick) (Drive: 11 plays, 67 yards, 2:59; Mississippi State 27-10)
- (1:52) Mississippi State - Davon Booth 3-yard run, (Kyle Ferrie kick) (Drive: 9 plays, 424 yards, 2:58; Mississippi State 34-10)

Fourth quarter

- (0:33) Southern Miss - TJ Johnson 7-yard pass from Braylon Braxton (Reed Harradine kick), (Drive: 10 plays, 73 yards, 4:16; Mississippi State 34-17)

Statistics	MSST	USM
First downs	23	18
Plays–yards	79–465	74–301
Rushes–yards	42–188	35–104
Passing yards	277	199
Passing: comp–att–int	27–37–1	26–39–1
Turnovers	1	1
Time of possession	30:21	29:39

Team	Category	Player	Statistics
Mississippi State	Passing	Blake Shapen	26/34, 270 yards, TD, INT
Mississippi State	Rushing	Davon Booth	16 carries, 79 yards, TD
Mississippi State	Receiving	Brenen Thompson	7 receptions, 92 yards
Southern Miss	Passing	Braylon Braxton	26/39, 199 yards, 2 TD, INT
Southern Miss	Rushing	Braylon Braxton	12 carries, 58 yards
Southern Miss	Receiving	Jeffery Pittman	6 receptions, 52 yards

=== vs No. 12 Arizona State ===
No. 12 Arizona State Sun Devils (1–0) at Mississippi State Bulldogs (1–0) – Game summary

Quarter	1	2	3	4	Total
No. 12 Sun Devils	0	3	7	10	20
Bulldogs	10	7	0	7	24

at Davis Wade Stadium • Starkville, Mississippi

- Date: September 6
- Game time: 6:30 p.m.
- Game weather: Clear • Temperature: 74 °F (23 °C) • Wind: N 3 mph
- Game attendance: 50,808
- Referee: Henry Johns
- TV announcers (ESPN2): Dave Flemming (play-by-play), Brock Osweiler (analyst), and Stormy Buonantony (sidelines)

Game information

First quarter

- MSST – Anthony Evans III 48-yard pass from Blake Shapen (Kyle Ferrie kick), 13:51. Bulldogs 7–0. Drive: 4 plays, 75 yards, 1:09.
- MSST – Kyle Ferrie 37-yard field goal, 1:18. Bulldogs 10–0. Drive: 13 plays, 45 yards, 4:51.

Second quarter

- MSST – Brenen Thompson 47-yard pass from Blake Shapen (Kyle Ferrie kick), 12:51. Bulldogs 17–0. Drive: 2 plays, 47 yards, 0:12.
- ASU – Jesus Gomez 51-yard field goal, 0:00. Bulldogs 17–3. Drive: 5 plays, 33 yards, 0:32.

Third quarter

- ASU – Kanye Udoh 6-yard run (Jesus Gomez kick), 10:34. Bulldogs 17–10. Drive: 8 plays, 75 yards, 4:26.

Fourth quarter

- ASU – Jordyn Tyson 2-yard pass from Sam Leavitt (Jesus Gomez kick), 13:07. Tied 17–17. Drive: 9 plays, 49 yards, 5:19.
- ASU – Jesus Gomez 18-yard field goal, 1:38. Sun Devils 20–17. Drive: 17 plays, 95 yards, 8:54.
- MSST – Brenen Thompson 58-yard pass from Blake Shapen (Kyle Ferrie kick), 0:30. Bulldogs 24–20. Drive: 5 plays, 77 yards, 1:08.

Statistics	ASU	MSST
First downs	23	17
Plays–yards	74–333	63–345
Rushes–yards	51–251	30–66
Passing yards	82	279
Passing: comp–att–int	10–23–2	19–33–0
Turnovers	2	0
Time of possession	37:57	22:03

Team	Category	Player	Statistics
Arizona State	Passing	Sam Leavitt	10/22, 82 yards, TD, 2 INT
Arizona State	Rushing	Raleek Brown	18 carries, 110 yards
Arizona State	Receiving	Jordyn Tyson	6 receptions, 68 yards, TD
Mississippi State	Passing	Blake Shapen	19/33, 279 yards, 3 TD
Mississippi State	Rushing	Fluff Bothwell	8 carries, 34 yards
Mississippi State	Receiving	Brenen Thompson	6 receptions, 133 yards, 2 TD

=== vs Alcorn State ===
Alcorn State Braves (0–2) at Mississippi State Bulldogs (2–0) – Game summary

Quarter	1	2	3	4	Total
Braves	0	0	0	0	0
Bulldogs	28	14	7	14	63

at Davis Wade Stadium • Starkville, Mississippi

- Date: September 13
- Game time: 5:02 p.m.
- Game weather: Sunny, 89°F, Northeast wind 4 mph
- Game attendance: 49,158
- Referee: Steven Robinson
- TV announcers (SECN+/ESPN+): Richard Cross (play-by-play), Charles Arbuckle (analyst), and Stephanie Otey (sidelines)

Game information

First quarter

- MSST – Jordan Mosley 75-yard pass from Blake Shapen (Kyle Ferrie kick), 14:43. Bulldogs 7–0. Drive: 2 plays, 75 yards, 0:17.
- MSST – Fluff Bothwell 3-yard run (Kyle Ferrie kick), 9:15. Bulldogs 14–0. Drive: 6 plays, 29 yards, 2:25.
- MSST – Brenen Thompson 42-yard pass from Kamario Taylor (Kyle Ferrie kick), 8:02. Bulldogs 21–0. Drive: 2 plays, 76 yards, 0:34.
- MSST – Blake Shapen 6-yard run (Kyle Ferrie kick), 5:12. Bulldogs 28–0. Drive: 3 plays, 27 yards, 0:58.

Second quarter

- MSST – Anthony Evans III 22-yard pass from Blake Shapen (Kyle Ferrie kick), 7:20. Bulldogs 35–0. Drive: 5 plays, 29 yards, 2:07.
- MSST – Fluff Bothwell 25-yard run (Kyle Ferrie kick), 3:50. Bulldogs 42–0. Drive: 7 plays, 44 yards, 2:03.

Third quarter

- MSST – Xavier Gayten 25-yard run (Kyle Ferrie kick), 5:53. Bulldogs 49–0. Drive: 5 plays, 63 yards, 2:10.

Fourth quarter

- MSST – Luke Kromenhoek 3-yard run (Marlon Hauck kick), 9:55. Bulldogs 56–0. Drive: 1 play, 3 yards, 5:05.
- MSST – Seth Davis 23-yard run (Marlon Hauck kick), 3:30. Bulldogs 63–0. Drive: 7 plays, 54 yards, 3:59.

Statistics	ALCN	MSST
First downs	9	23
Plays–yards	48–161	54–514
Rushes–yards	27–68	36–282
Passing yards	93	232
Passing: comp–att–int	13-21-1	13-18-1
Turnovers	3	1
Time of possession	43:07	16:53

Team	Category	Player	Statistics
Alcorn State	Passing	Jaylon Tolbert	11/18, 80 yards, INT
Alcorn State	Rushing	Jacorian Sewell	8 carries, 21 yards
Alcorn State	Receiving	Damien Jones	4 receptions, 21 yards
Mississippi State	Passing	Blake Shapen	10/14, 173 yards, 2 TD, INT
Mississippi State	Rushing	Fluff Bothwell	12 carries, 93 yards, 2 TD
Mississippi State	Receiving	Anthony Evans III	4 receptions, 66 yards, TD

=== vs Northern Illinois ===
Northern Illinois Huskies (1–2) at Mississippi State Bulldogs (3–0) – Game summary

Quarter	1	2	3	4	Total
Huskies	3	7	0	0	10
Bulldogs	7	7	10	14	38

at Davis Wade Stadium • Starkville, Mississippi

- Date: September 20
- Game time: 3:20 p.m.
- Game weather: Sunny, 90°F, NW wind 3 mph
- Game attendance: 45,803
- Referee: Lee Hedrick
- TV announcers (SEC Network): Dave Neal (play-by-play), Fozzy Whittaker (analyst), and Morgan Uber (sidelines)

Game information

First quarter

- MSST – Brenen Thompson 10-yard run (Kyle Ferrie kick), 9:41. Bulldogs 7–0. Drive: 10 plays, 63 yards, 5:19.
- NIU – Andrew Glass 30-yard field goal, 3:48. Bulldogs 7–3. Drive: 13 plays, 75 yards, 5:53.

Second quarter

- NIU – DeAree Rogers 24-yard pass from Josh Holst (Andrew Glass kick), 14:53. Huskies 10–7. Drive: 2 plays, 27 yards, 0:28.
- MSST – Seydou Traore 1-yard pass from Blake Shapen (Kyle Ferrie kick), 11:31. Bulldogs 14–10. Drive: 8 plays, 48 yards, 3:20.

Third quarter

- MSST – Davon Booth 1-yard run (Kyle Ferrie kick), 12:55. Bulldogs 21–10. Drive: 6 plays, 75 yards, 2:05.
- MSST – Kyle Ferrie 48-yard field goal, 0:54. Bulldogs 24–10. Drive: 15 plays, 50 yards, 7:47.

Fourth quarter

- MSST – Davon Booth 6-yard run (Kyle Ferrie kick), 11:18. Bulldogs 31–10. Drive: 5 plays, 64 yards, 2:10.
- MSST – Xavier Gayten 1-yard run (Kyle Ferrie kick), 4:31. Bulldogs 38–10. Drive: 8 plays, 43 yards, 5:02.

Statistics	NIU	MSST
First downs	14	23
Plays–yards	52–267	69–452
Rushes–yards	27–125	49–292
Passing yards	142	160
Passing: comp–att–int	15–25–1	12–20–0
Turnovers	1	0
Time of possession	28:05	31:55

Team	Category	Player	Statistics
Northern Illinois	Passing	Josh Holst	14/23, 135 yards, TD, INT
Northern Illinois	Rushing	Chavon Wright	13 carries, 47 yards
Northern Illinois	Receiving	DeAree Rogers	6 receptions, 84 yards, TD
Mississippi State	Passing	Blake Shapen	12/20, 160 yards, TD
Mississippi State	Rushing	Fluff Bothwell	17 carries, 101 yards
Mississippi State	Receiving	Anthony Evans III	4 receptions, 80 yards

=== vs No. 15 Tennessee ===
No. 15 Tennessee Volunteers (3–1) at Mississippi State Bulldogs (4–0) – Game summary

Quarter	1	2	3	4	OT	Total
No. 15 Volunteers	10	7	3	14	7	41
Bulldogs	7	10	7	10	0	34

at Davis Wade Stadium • Starkville, Mississippi

- Date: September 27
- Game time: 3:15 p.m.
- Game weather: Sunny • Temperature: 83 °F (28 °C)
- Game attendance: 60,417
- Referee: David Smith
- TV announcers (SECN): Dave Neal (play-by-play), Fozzy Whittaker (analyst), and Morgan Uber (sidelines)

Game information

First quarter

- 11:49 MSU – Fluff Bothwell 5-yard run, Kyle Ferrie kick (Drive: 5 plays , 20 yards, 01:38; MSU 7–0)
- 09:19 TENN – Max Gilbert 38-yard field goal (Drive: 7 plays, 55 yards, 02:30; MSU 7–3)
- 04:19 TENN – Colton Hood 23-yard interception return, Max Gilbert kick (TENN 10–7)

Second quarter

- 13:53 MSU – Davon Booth 5-yard run, Kyle Ferrie kick (Drive: 15 plays, 75 yards, 05:26; MSU 14–10)
- 08:41 MSU – Kyle Ferrie 51-yard field goal (Drive: 8 plays, 51 yards, 03:10, MSU 17–10)
- 07:25 TENN – Chris Brazzell II 15-yard pass from Joey Aguilar, Max Gilbert kick (Drive: 4 plays, 75 yards, 01:16; Tied 17–17

Third quarter

- 11:28 TENN – Max Gilbert 27-yard field goal (Drive: 10 plays 66 yards, 03:32; TENN 20–17
- 03:48 MSU – Fluff Bothwell 1-yard run, Kyle Ferrie kick (Drive: 4 plays, 26 yards, 01:01; MSU 24–20)

Fourth quarter

- 13:29 TENN – Joshua Josephs 41-yard fumble return, Max Gilbert kick (TENN 27–24)
- 10:31 MSU – Kyle Ferrie 38-yard field goal (Drive: 6 plays, 54 yards, 02:58; Tied 27–27)
- 07:59 MSU –Seydou Traore 2-yard pass from Blake Shapen, Kyle Ferrie kick (Drive: 5 plays, 17 yards, 01:44; MSU 34–27)
- 01:55 TENN – Joey Aguilar 6-yard run, Max Gilbert kick (Drive: 13 plays, 75 yards, 06:04; Tied 34–34

Overtime

- TENN – DeSean Bishop 25-yard run, Max Gilbert kick (Drive: 1 play, 25 yards; TENN 41–34)

Statistics	TENN	MSST
First downs	24	24
Plays–yards	72–466	86–378
Rushes–yards	32–131	57–198
Passing yards	335	180
Passing: comp–att–int	24–40–2	18–29–1
Turnovers	3	2
Time of possession	27:37	32:23

Team	Category	Player	Statistics
Tennessee	Passing	Joey Aguilar	24/40, 335 yards, TD, 2 INT
Tennessee	Rushing	DeSean Bishop	11 carries, 72 yards, TD
Tennessee	Receiving	Chris Brazzell II	6 receptions, 105 yards, TD
Mississippi State	Passing	Blake Shapen	18/29, 189 yards, TD, INT
Mississippi State	Rushing	Fluff Bothwell	23 carries, 135 yards, 2 TD
Mississippi State	Receiving	Seydou Traore	4 receptions, 40 yards, TD

=== at No. 6 Texas A&M ===
Mississippi State Bulldogs (4–1) at No. 6 Texas A&M Aggies (4–0) – Game summary

Quarter	1	2	3	4	Total
Bulldogs	3	0	0	6	9
No. 6 Aggies	0	7	7	17	31

at Kyle Field • College Station, Texas

- Date: October 4
- Game time: 6:30 p.m.
- Game weather:
- Game attendance: 108,572
- Referee: Kyle Olson
- TV announcers (SECN): Tom Hart (play-by-play), Jordan Rodgers (analyst) and Cole Cubelic (sidelines)

Game information

First quarter

- MSST – Kyle Ferrie 24-yard field goal, 4:21. Bulldogs 3–0. Drive: 15 plays, 22 yards, 5:45.

Second quarter

- TA&M – KC Concepcion 34-yard pass from Marcel Reed (Randy Bond kick), 1:51. Aggies 7–3. Drive: 6 plays, 64 yards, 2:23.

Third quarter

- TA&M – KC Concepcion 2-yard pass from Marcel Reed (Randy Bond kick), 3:30. Aggies 14–3. Drive: 5 plays, 62 yards, 2:09.

Fourth quarter

- TA&M – Marcel Reed 7-yard run (Randy Bond kick), 11:38. Aggies 21–3. Drive: 10 plays, 79 yards, 5:28.
- TA&M – Mario Craver 7-yard run (Randy Bond kick), 9:13. Aggies 28–3. Drive: 4 plays, 24 yards, 2:12.
- MSST – Brenen Thompson 44-yard pass from Blake Shapen (run failed), 7:53. Aggies 28–9. Drive: 5 plays, 75 yards, 1:20.
- TA&M – Randy Bond 27-yard field goal, 4:41. Aggies 31–9. Drive: 7 plays, 65 yards, 3:11.

Statistics	MSST	TA&M
First downs	14	23
Plays–yards	51–219	77–479
Rushes–yards	31–77	54–299
Passing yards	142	180
Passing: comp–att–int	15–20–1	13–23–1
Turnovers	2	1
Time of possession	21:43	38:17

Team	Category	Player	Statistics
Mississippi State	Passing	Blake Shapen	15/20, 142 yards, TD, INT
Mississippi State	Rushing	Fluff Bothwell	14 carries, 60 yards
Mississippi State	Receiving	Brenen Thompson	2 receptions, 54 yards, TD
Texas A&M	Passing	Marcel Reed	13/23, 2 TD, INT
Texas A&M	Rushing	Rueben Owens II	21 carries, 142 yards
Texas A&M	Receiving	Mario Craver	6 receptions, 80 yards

=== at Florida ===
Mississippi State Bulldogs (4–2) at Florida Gators (2–4) – Game summary

Quarter	1	2	3	4	Total
Bulldogs	7	0	0	14	21
Gators	3	10	0	10	23

at Ben Hill Griffin Stadium • Gainesville, Florida

- Date: October 18
- Game time: 3:15 p.m.
- Game weather:
- Game attendance: 90,203
- Referee: Matt Loeffler
- TV announcers (SECN): Dave Neal (play-by-play), Fozzy Whitaker (analyst), and Morgan Uber (sideline reporter)

Game information

First quarter

- MSST – Kamario Taylor 2-yard run (Kyle Ferrie kick), 12:18. Bulldogs 7–0. Drive: 8 plays, 75 yards, 2:42.
- FLA – Trey Smack 24-yard field goal, 8:55. Bulldogs 7–3. Drive: 11 plays, 58 yards, 3:23.

Second quarter

- FLA – Jadan Baugh 19-yard run (Trey Smack kick), 14:15. Gators 10–7. Drive: 6 plays, 69 yards, 2:21.
- FLA – Trey Smack 54-yard field goal, 3:08. Gators 13–7. Drive: 11 plays, 49 yards, 5:31.

Third quarter

- No scoring plays.

Fourth quarter

- FLA – KD Daniels 1-yard run (Trey Smack kick), 13:41. Gators 20–7. Drive: 11 plays, 93 yards, 5:19.
- MSST – Davon Booth 2-yard run (Kyle Ferrie kick), 11:57. Gators 20–14. Drive: 5 plays, 65 yards, 1:44.
- FLA – Trey Smack 53-yard field goal, 6:49. Gators 23–14. Drive: 8 plays, 40 yards, 5:08.
- MSST – Davon Booth 2-yard run (Kyle Ferrie kick), 2:00. Gators 23–21. Drive: 13 plays, 75 yards, 4:49.

Statistics	MSST	FLA
First downs	22	25
Plays–yards	80–468	68–452
Rushes–yards	44–144	33–172
Passing yards	324	280
Passing: comp–att–int	24–36–1	20–34–2
Turnovers	2	2
Time of possession	30:05	29:55

Team	Category	Player	Statistics
Mississippi State	Passing	Blake Shapen	24/36, 324 yards, INT
Mississippi State	Rushing	Davon Booth	22 carries, 105 yards, 2 TD
Mississippi State	Receiving	Brenen Thompson	7 receptions, 155 yards
Florida	Passing	DJ Lagway	20/34, 280 yards, 2 INT
Florida	Rushing	Jadan Baugh	23 carries, 150 yards, TD
Florida	Receiving	Vernell Brown III	5 receptions, 95 yards

=== vs No. 22 Texas ===
No. 22 Texas Longhorns (5–2) at Mississippi State Bulldogs (4–3) – Game summary

Quarter	1	2	3	4	OT	Total
No. 22 Longhorns	7	7	0	24	7	45
Bulldogs	7	17	7	7	0	38

at Davis Wade Stadium • Starkville, Mississippi

- Date: October 25
- Game time: 3:15 p.m.
- Game weather:
- Game attendance: 52,680
- Referee: Jason Autrey
- TV announcers (SECN): Taylor Zarzour (play-by-play), Matt Stinchcomb (analyst), and Alyssa Lang (sidelines)

Game information

First quarter

- (13:01) TEX – Arch Manning 3-yard run (Mason Shipley kick), (Drive: 2 plays, 63 yards, 0:58; Texas 7–0)
- (5:14) MSST – Sam West 13-yard pass from Blake Shapen (Kyle Ferrie kick), (Drive: 6 plays, 53 yards, 2:22; Tied 7–7)

Second quarter

- (12:41) TEX – Parker Livingstone 1-yard pass from Arch Manning (Mason Shipley kick), (Drive: 10 plays, 37 yards, 4:14; Texas 14–7)
- (9:21) MSST – Seydou Traore 1-yard pass from Kamario Taylor (Kyle Ferrie kick), (Drive: 11 plays, 83 yards, 3:16; Tied 14–14)
- (02:30) MSST – Kyle Ferrie 24-yard field goal (Drive: 7 plays, 34 yards, 3:17; Mississippi State 17–14)
- (0:38) MSST – Brenen Thompson 23-yard pass from Blake Shapen (Kyle Ferrie kick), (Drive: 6 plays, 60 yards, 1:05; Mississippi State 24–14)

Third quarter

- (0:26) MSST – Brenen Thompson 4-yard pass from Blake Shapen (Kyle Ferrie kick), (Drive: 8 plays, 80 yards, 3:43; Mississippi State 31–14)

Fourth quarter

- (13:15) TEX – Parker Livingstone 6-yard pass from Arch Manning (Mason Shipley kick), (Drive: 5 plays, 80 yards, 2:05; Mississippi State 31–21)
- (12:29) MSST – Devon Booth 62-yard pass from Blake Shapen (Kyle Ferrie kick), (Drive: 3 plays, 75 yards, 0:46; Mississippi State 38–21)
- (9:34) TEX – Emmett Mosley 21-yard pass from Arch Manning (Mason Shipley kick), (Drive: 9 plays, 75 yards, 2:55; Mississippi State 38–28)
- (4:14) TEX – Mason Shipley 26-yard field goal (Drive: 12 plays, 53 yards, 3:39; Mississippi State 38–31)
- (1:47) TEX – Ryan Niblett 79-yard punt return (Mason Shipley kick), (Drive: 3 plays, 9 yards, 2:21; Tied 38–38)

Overtime

- TEX – Emmett Mosley 10-yard pass from Matthew Caldwell (Mason Shipley kick), (Drive: 3 plays, 25 yards; Texas 45–38)

Statistics	TEX	MSST
First downs	22	25
Plays–yards	79–428	86–445
Rushes–yards	32–72	43–63
Passing yards	356	382
Passing: comp–att–int	30–47–1	27–43–0
Turnovers	1	1
Time of possession	30:01	29:59

Team	Category	Player	Statistics
Texas	Passing	Arch Manning	29–46, 346 yards, 3 TD, INT
Texas	Rushing	Quintrevion Wisner	12 carries, 41 yards
Texas	Receiving	Ryan Wingo	5 receptions, 184 yards
Mississippi State	Passing	Blake Shapen	26–42, 381 yards, 4 TD
Mississippi State	Rushing	Davon Booth	24 carries, 99 yards
Mississippi State	Receiving	Davon Booth	3 receptions, 85 yards, TD

=== at Arkansas ===
Mississippi State Bulldogs (4–4) at Arkansas Razorbacks (2–6) – Game summary

Quarter	1	2	3	4	Total
Bulldogs	7	0	14	17	38
Razorbacks	0	13	15	7	35

at Donald W. Reynolds Razorback Stadium • Fayetteville, Arkansas

- Date: November 1
- Game time: 3:00 p.m.
- Game weather:
- Game attendance: 68,358
- Referee: Kyle Olson
- TV announcers (SEC Network): Tom Hart (play-by-play), Jordan Rodgers (analyst), Cole Cubelic (sideline)

Game information

First quarter

- (7:06) MSST – Davon Booth 8-yard pass from Blake Shapen (Kyle Ferrie kick) (Drive: 12 plays, 80 yards, 4:33; Mississippi State 7–0)

Second quarter

- (13:54) ARK – Rohan Jones 3-yard pass from Taylen Green (Scott Starzyk kick) (Drive: 9 plays, 56 yards, 4:18; 7–7)
- (7:32) ARK – Scott Starzyk 42-yard field goal (Drive: 11 plays, 56 yards, 4:34; Arkansas 10–7)
- (0:01) ARK – Scott Starzyk 30-yard field goal (Drive: 13 plays, 85 yards, 3:56; Arkansas 13–7)

Third quarter

- (13:43) MSST – Anthony Evans III 45-yard pass from Kamario Taylor (Kyle Ferrie kick) (Drive: 4 plays, 75 yards, 1:17; Mississippi State 14–13)
- (9:23) ARK – Taylen Green 8-yard run (Scott Starzyk kick) (Drive: 9 plays, 75 yards, 4:20; Arkansas 20–14)
- (6:18) ARK – Mike Washington Jr. 20-yard run (Taylen Green pass to Rohan Jones for two-point conversion) (Drive: 2 plays, 61 yards, 0:31; Arkansas 28–14)
- (4:49) MSST – Kamario Taylor 20-yard run (Kyle Ferrie kick) (Drive: 4 plays, 45 yards, 1:25; Arkansas 28–21)

Fourth quarter

- (13:43) ARK – Braylen Russell 2-yard run (Scott Starzyk kick) (Drive: 7 plays, 41 yards, 3:37; Arkansas 35–21)
- (10:16) MSST – Davon Booth 2-yard run (Kyle Ferrie kick) (Drive: 9 plays, 75 yards, 3:27; Arkansas 35–28)
- (5:07) MSST – Kyle Ferrie 46-yard field goal (Drive: 8 plays, 43 yards, 3:22; Arkansas 35–31)
- (0:48) MSST – Anthony Evans III 18-yard pass from Blake Shapen (Kyle Ferrie kick) (Drive: 10 plays, 69 yards, 2:20; Mississippi State 38–35)

Statistics	MSST	ARK
First downs	21	24
Plays–yards	71–388	77–433
Rushes–yards	38–106	46–239
Passing yards	282	194
Passing: comp–att–int	16–28–1	19–31–0
Turnovers	1	0
Time of possession	25:39	34:21

Team	Category	Player	Statistics
Mississippi State	Passing	Blake Shapen	16–28, 242 yards, 2 TD, INT
Mississippi State	Rushing	Kamario Taylor	6 carries, 55 yards, TD
Mississippi State	Receiving	Anthony Evans III	5 receptions, 111 yards, 2 TD
Arkansas	Passing	Taylen Green	19–31, 194 yards, TD
Arkansas	Rushing	Mike Washington Jr.	19 carries, 116 yards, TD
Arkansas	Receiving	Rohan Jones	4 receptions, 65 yards

=== vs No. 5 Georgia ===
No. 5 Georgia Bulldogs (7–1) at Mississippi State Bulldogs (5–4) – Game summary

Quarter	1	2	3	4	Total
No. 5 Georgia	3	21	14	3	41
Mississippi State	7	0	7	7	21

at Davis Wade Stadium • Starkville, Mississippi

- Date: November 8
- Game time: 11:00 a.m.
- Game weather: Broken Clouds • Temperature: 75 °F (24 °C) • Wind: SW 5 mph
- Game attendance: 53,017
- Referee: Daniel Gautreaux
- TV announcers (ESPN): Dave Pasch (play-by-play), Dusty Dvoracek (analyst), and Taylor McGregor (sidelines)

Game information

First quarter

- (9:26) MSST – Kamario Taylor 4-yard run, Kyle Ferrie kick (Drive: 14 plays, 75 yards, 5:34; Mississippi State 7–0)
- (6:41) UGA – Peyton Woodring 49-yard field goal (Drive: 7 plays, 46 yards, 2:39; Mississippi State 7–3)

Second quarter

- (14:11) UGA – Chauncey Bowens 4-yard run, Peyton Woodring kick (Drive: 4 plays, 27 yards, 1:00; Georgia 10–7)
- (5:09) UGA – Oscar Delp 8-yard pass from Gunner Stockton, Peyton Woodring kick (Drive: 13 plays, 90 yards, 7:02; Georgia 17–7)
- (0:11) UGA – Zachariah Branch 19-yard pass from Gunner Stockton, Peyton Woodring kick (Drive: 9 plays, 77 yards, 2:14; Georgia 24–7)

Third quarter

- (12:32) UGA – Nate Frazier 59-yard run, Peyton Woodring kick (Drive: 5 plays, 75 yards, 2:28; Georgia 31–7)
- (9:57) UGA – Noah Thomas 64-yard pass from Gunner Stockton, Peyton Woodring kick (Drive: 3 plays, 72 yards, 1:33; Georgia 38–7)
- (4:49) MSST – Kamario Taylor 1-yard run, Kyle Ferrie kick (Drive: 14 plays, 75 yards, 5:09; Georgia 38–14)

Fourth quarter

- (12:03) UGA – Peyton Woodring 46-yard field goal (Drive: 8 plays, 40 yards, 3:10; Georgia 41–14)
- (4:47) MSST – Kamario Taylor 2-yard run, Kyle Ferrie kick (Drive: 5 plays, 81 yards, 1:59; Georgia 41–21)

Statistics	UGA	MSST
First downs	30	18
Plays–yards	74–567	68–322
Rushes–yards	44–303	43–149
Passing yards	264	173
Passing: comp–att–int	18–30–0	16–25–0
Turnovers	1	1
Time of possession	33:07	26:53

Team	Category	Player	Statistics
Georgia	Passing	Gunner Stockton	18/29, 264 yards, 3 TD
Georgia	Rushing	Nate Frazier	12 carries, 181 yards, TD
Georgia	Receiving	Noah Thomas	3 receptions, 78 yards, TD
Mississippi State	Passing	Kamario Taylor	6/10, 87 yards
Mississippi State	Rushing	Kamario Taylor	12 carries, 53 yards, 3 TD
Mississippi State	Receiving	Brenen Thompson	4 receptions, 92 yards

=== at Missouri ===
Mississippi State Bulldogs (5–5) at Missouri Tigers (6–3) – Game summary

Quarter	1	2	3	4	Total
Bulldogs	10	0	14	3	27
Tigers	14	7	14	14	49

at Faurot Field • Columbia, Missouri

- Date: November 15
- Game time: 6:45 p.m.
- Game weather:
- Game attendance: 57,321
- Referee: Lee Hedrick
- TV announcers (SECN): Tom Hart (play-by-play), Jordan Rodgers (analyst), and Cole Cubelic (sideline)

Game information

First quarter

- MIZ – Donovan Olugbode 26-yard pass from Matt Zollers (Robert Meyer kick), 11:29. Tigers 7–0. Drive: 5 plays, 65 yards, 1:56.
- MSST – Kyle Ferrie 47-yard field goal, 6:28. Tigers 7–3. Drive: 9 plays, 51 yards, 4:54.
- MIZ – Joshua Manning 34-yard pass from Matt Zollers (Robert Meyer kick), 4:52. Tigers 14–3. Drive: 4 plays, 75 yards, 1:36.
- MSST – Blake Shapen 2-yard run (Kyle Ferrie kick), 0:00. Tigers 14–10. Drive: 9 plays, 75 yards, 4:52.

Second quarter

- MIZ – Ahmad Hardy 10-yard run (Robert Meyer kick), 2:36. Tigers 21–10. Drive: 5 plays, 23 yards, 2:17.

Third quarter

- MSST – Blake Shapen 3-yard run (Kyle Ferrie kick), 10:28. Tigers 21–17. Drive: 10 plays, 52 yards, 3:20.
- MIZ – Ahmad Hardy 72-yard run (Robert Meyer kick), 5:56. Tigers 28–17. Drive: 2 plays, 76 yards, 0:41.
- MIZ – Toriano Pride Jr. 19-yard interception return (Robert Meyer kick), 5:47. Tigers 35–17.
- MSST – Seydou Traore 3-yard pass from Kamario Taylor (Kyle Ferrie kick), 2:47. Tigers 35–24. Drive: 9 plays, 80 yards, 2:56.

Fourth quarter

- MIZ – Marvin Burks Jr. 28-yard interception return (Robert Meyer kick), 13:09. Tigers 42–24.
- MIZ – Ahmad Hardy 43-yard run (Robert Meyer kick), 11:11. Tigers 49–24. Drive: 1 play, 43 yards, 0:10.
- MSST – Kyle Ferrie 41-yard field goal, 5:19. Tigers 49–27. Drive: 15 plays, 61 yards, 5:51.

Statistics	MSST	MIZ
First downs	27	17
Plays–yards	90–345	55–438
Rushes–yards	52–110	39–326
Passing yards	235	112
Passing: comp–att–int	23–38–2	8–16–1
Turnovers	3	2
Time of possession	36:42	23:18

Team	Category	Player	Statistics
Mississippi State	Passing	Blake Shapen	19/33, 199 yards, 2 INT
Mississippi State	Rushing	Davon Booth	10 carries, 34 yards
Mississippi State	Receiving	Anthony Evans III	7 receptions, 71 yards
Missouri	Passing	Matt Zollers	8/15, 112 yards, 2 TD, INT
Missouri	Rushing	Ahmad Hardy	25 carries, 300 yards, 3 TD
Missouri	Receiving	Kevin Coleman Jr.	4 receptions, 41 yards

=== vs No. 7 Ole Miss (Egg Bowl) ===
No. 7 Ole Miss Rebels (10–1) at Mississippi State Bulldogs (5–6) – Game summary

Quarter	1	2	3	4	Total
No. 7 Rebels	14	7	3	14	38
Bulldogs	7	3	3	6	19

at Davis Wade Stadium • Starkville, Mississippi

- Date: November 28
- Game time: 11:00 a.m.
- Game weather: Sunny • Temperature: 47 °F (8 °C) • Wind: NE at 3 miles per hour (4.8 km/h)
- Game attendance: 60,417
- Referee: James Carter
- TV announcers (ABC): Dave Pasch (play-by-play), Dusty Dvoracek (analyst), Taylor McGregor, and Marty Smith (sideline reporters)

Game information

First quarter

- MISS – Kewan Lacy 31-yard run (Lucas Carneiro kick), 13:05. Rebels 7–0. Drive: 5 plays, 75 yards, 1:55.
- MSST – Kamario Taylor 22-yard run (Kyle Ferrie kick), 8:50. Tied 7–7. Drive: 10 plays, 97 yards, 4:15.
- MISS – Harrison Wallace III 24-yard pass from Trinidad Chambliss (Lucas Carneiro kick), 5:22. Rebels 14–7. Drive: 8 plays, 75 yards, 3:28.

Second quarter

- MSST – Kyle Ferrie 40-yard field goal, 1:45. Rebels 14–10. Drive: 6 plays, 58 yards, 1:22.
- MISS – De'Zhaun Stribling 10-yard pass from Trinidad Chambliss (Lucas Carneiro kick), 0:12. Rebels 21–10. Drive: 9 plays, 75 yards, 1:33.
- MISS –

Third quarter

- MSST – Kyle Ferrie 36-yard field goal, 10:01. Rebels 21–13. Drive: 12 plays, 57 yards, 4:59.
- MISS – Lucas Carneiro 43-yard field goal, 6:43. Rebels 24–13. Drive: 8 plays, 49 yards, 3:18.

Fourth quarter

- MISS – De'Zhaun Stribling 23-yard pass from Trinidad Chambliss (Lucas Carneiro kick), 13:46. Rebels 31–13. Drive: 11 plays, 77 yards, 4:57.
- MSST – Kamario Taylor 35-yard run (pass failed), 10:40. Rebels 31–19. Drive: 9 plays, 75 yards, 3:06.
- MISS – Deuce Alexander 88-yard pass from Trinidad Chambliss (Lucas Carneiro kick), 9:50. Rebels 38–19. Drive: 2 plays, 90 yards, 0:43.

Statistics	MISS	MSST
First downs	29	22
Plays–yards	75–545	74–440
Rushes–yards	41–186	43–262
Passing yards	359	178
Passing: comp–att–int	23–34–0	15–31–1
Turnovers	0	1
Time of possession	31:23	28:37

Team	Category	Player	Statistics
Ole Miss	Passing	Trinidad Chambliss	23/34, 359 yards, 4 TD
Ole Miss	Rushing	Kewan Lacy	27 carries, 143 yards, TD
Ole Miss	Receiving	Deuce Alexander	2 receptions, 94 yards, TD
Mississippi State	Passing	Kamario Taylor	15/31, 178 yards, INT
Mississippi State	Rushing	Kamario Taylor	20 carries, 173 yards, 2 TD
Mississippi State	Receiving	Brenen Thompson	6 receptions, 80 yards

=== vs. Wake Forest (Duke's Mayo Bowl) ===
2026 Duke's Mayo Bowl
Wake Forest Demon Deacons (8–4) vs Mississippi State Bulldogs (5–7) – Game summary

Quarter	1	2	3	4	Total
Demon Deacons	15	0	15	13	43
Bulldogs	6	3	11	9	29

at Bank of America Stadium • Charlotte, NC

- Date: January 2, 2026
- Game time: 7:00 p.m. CST
- Game weather: Cloudy • Temperature: 57 °F (14 °C) • Wind: 6 mph (9.7 km/h) northeast
- Game attendance: 29,328
- Referee: Gregory Blum
- TV announcers (ESPN): Anish Shroff (play-by-play), Andre Ware (analyst) and Paul Carcaterra (sideline)

Game information

First quarter

- MSST – Kyle Ferrie 33-yard field goal, 12:55. Bulldogs 3–0. Drive: 7 plays, 60 yards, 2:05.
- WAKE – Kordell Bartley 100-yard kickoff return (Sawyer Racanelli-Eni Falayi pass), 12:33. Demon Deacons 8–3.
- MSST – Kyle Ferrie 50-yard field goal, 7:12. Demon Deacons 8–6. Drive: 6 plays, 42 yards, 2:00.
- WAKE – Kamrean Johnson 14-yard pass from Robby Ashford (Connor Calvert kick), 3:49. Demon Deacons 15–6. Drive: 9 plays, 75 yards, 3:23.

Second quarter

- MSST – Kyle Ferrie 23-yard field goal, 6:15. Demon Deacons 15–9. Drive: 10 plays, 56 yards, 5:11.

Third quarter

- WAKE – Jack Foley 64-yard pass from Robby Ashford (Robby Ashford run), 14:06. Demon Deacons 23–9. Drive: 3 plays, 75 yards, 0:54.
- MSST – Kyle Ferrie 36-yard field goal, 9:24. Demon Deacons 23–12. Drive: 5 plays, 15 yards, 2:07.
- WAKE – Robby Ashford 2-yard run (Connor Calvert kick), 4:19. Demon Deacons 30–12. Drive: 11 plays, 75 yards, 5:05.
- MSST – Kamario Taylor 1-yard run (Kamario Taylor–Seydou Traore pass), 0:00. Demon Deacons 30–20. Drive: 8 plays, 65 yards, 4:19.

Fourth quarter

- MSST – Sanfrisco Magee 42-yard pass from Kamario Taylor (Kyle Ferrie kick), 10:17. Demon Deacons 30–27. Drive: 4 plays, 84 yards, 1:09.
- WAKE – Robby Ashford 1-yard run (Connor Calvert kick BLOCKED), 4:07. Demon Deacons 36–27. Drive: 10 plays, 63 yards, 6:03.
- MSST – Kelley Jones defensive PAT conversion, 4:07. Demon Deacons 36–29.
- WAKE – Ty Clark III 62-yard pass from Robby Ashford (Connor Calvert kick), 2:15. Demon Deacons 43–29. Drive: 3 plays, 65 yards, 0:20.

Statistics	WF	MSST
First downs	23	20
Plays–yards	68–451	69–408
Rushes–yards	35–148	42–114
Passing yards	303	294
Passing: Comp–Att–Int	20–33–1	16–27–0
Turnovers	1	0
Time of possession	31:35	28:25

Team	Category	Player	Statistics
Wake Forest	Passing	Robby Ashford	20/33, 303 yards, 3 TD, INT
Wake Forest	Rushing	Ty Clark III	17 carries, 91 yards
Wake Forest	Receiving	Carlos Hernandez	6 receptions, 73 yards
Mississippi State	Passing	Kamario Taylor	13/22, 241 yards, TD
Mississippi State	Rushing	Kamario Taylor	18 carries, 63 yards, TD
Mississippi State	Receiving	Brenen Thompson	4 receptions, 106 yards

== Personnel ==
2025 Mississippi State Bulldogs football team roster
Players
Coaches
Offense

Pos.	#	Name	Class
WR	0	Brenen Thompson	Sr
QB	1	Kamario Taylor	Fr
QB	2	Blake Shapen (C)	GS
WR	3	Anthony Evans III	Jr
WR	4	Jordan Mosley (C)	Sr
TE	5	Max Reese	Jr
RB	6	Davon Booth	GS
WR	7	Markus Allen	Sr
TE	8	Seydou Traore	Sr
WR	9	Ricky Johnson	Fr
TE	10	Cameron Ball	Jr
WR	11	Ayden Williams	Jr
WR	12	Cam Thompson	Jr
WR	13	Sanfrisco Magee	Fr
WR	14	Gracen Harris	Fr
QB	15	Billy Puckett	Fr
QB	17	Luke Kromenhoek	So
WR	18	Jaron Glover	Jr
RB	20	Johnnie Daniels	Sr
RB	21	Geron Johnson	Fr
RB	22	Xavier Gayten	So
RB	23	Seth Davis	So
RB	24	Fluff Bothwell	So
RB	26	Kolin Wilson	Fr
TE	42	Sam Paxton	Sr
OL	50	Koby Keenum	So
OL	51	Luke Work	So
OL	52	Zack Owens	So
OL	53	Brennan Smith	Sr
OL	54	Blake Steen	Jr
OL	55	Jakheem Shumpert	Jr
OL	56	Wesley Davis	Jr
OL	58	T. J. Lockhart	Fr
OL	59	Alex Lopez	Fr
OL	61	Trevor Mayberry	GS
OL	65	Spencer Dowland	Fr
OL	70	Breyden Turnage	Fr
OL	71	Saquon Miles	Jr
OL	72	Canon Boone	Sr
OL	73	Jaekwon Bouldin	Jr
OL	74	Jimothy Lewis Jr.	Fr
OL	75	Jacoby Jackson	Sr
OL	76	Albert Reese IV	Sr
OL	77	Jayvin James	So
WR	80	AJ Lewis Jr.	Fr
WR	81	Isaiah Mitchell	Fr
WR	82	Davian Jackson	Fr
TE	84	Emeka Iloh	Jr
TE	87	Sam West	So
TE	88	Joeseph Skipworth	Fr
WR	89	Jessie Primer IV	Fr

Defense

Pos.	#	Name	Class
LB	0	Fatt Forrest	Fr
CB	1	Kelley Jones	So
S	2	Isaac Smith	Jr
S	3	Brylan Lanier	Sr
CB	4	DeAngelo Brumfield	Sr
S	5	Braylon Burnside	So
DL	6	Deonte Anderson	Sr
LB	7	Zakari Tillman	Jr
LB	8	Malick Sylla	Sr
S	9	Tony Mitchell	Jr
LB	10	Jalen Smith	So
LB	11	Tyler Lockhart	Fr
S	12	Tyler Woodard	Jr
S	13	Jahron Manning	Sr
S	14	Lo'Kavion Jackson	Fr
CB	15	Jayven Williams	Jr
LB	16	Derion Gullette	So
CB	17	Kyle Johnson	Fr
S	18	Sekou Smith Jr.	Fr
S	19	Cyrus Reyes	So
CB	20	Amarien Jefferson	Jr
S	21	Hunter Washington (C)	Sr
DL	22	Kendrick Bingley-Jones (C)	Sr
DL	23	Trevion Williams	Jr
CB	24	Elijah Cannon	Fr
DL	25	Raishein Thomas	GS
CB	26	Dwight Lewis III	Sr
DL	27	Red Hibbler	GS
S	28	Tanner Johnson	Jr
S	29	Jatavious Johnson	Fr
LB	30	Montrell Chapman	Jr
LB	31	LaKendrick James	Jr
LB	32	AJ Rice	Fr
S	34	Vic Sutton	So
DL	35	Kalvin Dinkins	Jr
LB, S	36	Ja'Bryis Stewart	Jr
LB	37	Nevaeh Sanders	GS
CB	38	Jaylen Antoine	Fr
LB	40	Nic Mitchell	Sr
LB	41	Tyshun Willis	Fr
DL	42	Darron Reed Jr.	So
DL	43	Will Whitson	GS
LB	44	Branden Jennings	Sr
DL	46	Joseph Head Jr.	So
DB	47	Sean Pleasant	Fr
LB	48	Turner Reeves	Fr
DL	55	Collin Coates	Jr
DL	88	Jamil Burroughs	Sr
DL	90	Kai McClendon	So
DL	92	Jaray Bledsoe	Jr
DL	94	Corey Clark	Jr
DL	97	Terrance Hibbler Jr.	Fr
DL	98	Ashun Sheppard	Sr
DL	99	Jamarcus Moye	Jr

Special teams

Pos.	#	Name	Class
P	38	Nathan Tiyce	Fr
LS	39	Kallen Cosper	Fr
LS	45	Ethan Myers	Sr
K	47	William Wilkinson	Fr
K	49	Marlon Hauck	Jr
K	80	Kyle Ferrie	Jr
P	88	Ethan Pulliam	So

Head coach

- Jeff Lebby

Coordinators/assistant coaches

- Anthony Tucker
  Assistant head coach/Pass game coordinator/Running backs
- Coleman Hutzler
  Defensive coordinator/Linebackers
- Matt Barnes
  Co-defensive coordinator/Safeties
- Corey Bell
  Cornerbacks
- Chad Bumphis
  Wide receivers
- Jon Cooper
  Run game coordinator/Tight ends
- Vincent Dancy
  Defensive ends/Outside linebackers
- Matt Holecek
  Quarterbacks
- Phil Loadholt
  Offensive line
- Cliff Odom
  Special teams coordinator
- David Turner
  Defensive line
- Alex Jackson
  Assistant offensive line
- Ryan McKim
  Director of advanced scouting and special projects
- Tanner Schafer
  Quarterback analyst
- Ben Tawwater
  Offensive line analyst
- Dalton White
  Offensive analyst

Legend

- (C) Team captain
- (S) Suspended
- (I) Ineligible
- Injured
- Redshirt

Roster
Last update: June 18, 2025
