= 2024 Mississippi State Bulldogs football team =

American college football season

2024 Mississippi State Bulldogs football
- Conference: Southeastern Conference
- Record: 2–10 (0–8 SEC)
- Head coach: Jeff Lebby (1st season)
- Offensive scheme: Veer and shoot
- Defensive coordinator: Coleman Hutzler (1st season)
- Co-defensive coordinator: Matt Barnes (1st season)
- Base defense: 3–4
- Home stadium: Davis Wade Stadium

2024 Southeastern Conference football standings
	Conf.			Overall
Team	W		L	W		L
No. 4 Texas y^	7	–	1	13	–	3
No. 6 Georgia y$^	6	–	2	11	–	3
No. 9 Tennessee ^	6	–	2	10	–	3
No. 22 Missouri	5	–	3	10	–	3
No. 11 Ole Miss	5	–	3	10	–	3
No. 17 Alabama	5	–	3	9	–	4
No. 19 South Carolina	5	–	3	9	–	4
LSU	5	–	3	9	–	4
Texas A&M	5	–	3	8	–	5
Florida	4	–	4	8	–	5
Arkansas	3	–	5	7	–	6
Vanderbilt	3	–	5	7	–	6
Oklahoma	2	–	6	6	–	7
Auburn	2	–	6	5	–	7
Kentucky	1	–	7	4	–	8
Mississippi State	0	–	8	2	–	10
Championship: Georgia 22, Texas 19 ^{OT}
^ – College Football Playoff participant; $ – Conference champion; y – Championship game participant; Rankings from AP Poll

The 2024 Mississippi State Bulldogs football team represented Mississippi State University in the Southeastern Conference (SEC) during the 2024 NCAA Division I FBS football season. The Bulldogs were led by first-year head coach Jeff Lebby. The team played its home games at Davis Wade Stadium in Starkville.

== Schedule ==
Mississippi State and the SEC announced the 2024 football schedule on December 13, 2023. The 2024 Bulldogs' schedule consisted of 7 home games and 5 away games for the regular season. Mississippi State hosted four SEC conference opponents Arkansas, Florida, Missouri and Texas A&M at home and travelled to four SEC opponents, Georgia, Ole Miss (Egg Bowl), Tennessee and Texas to close out the SEC regular season on the road. The Bulldogs’ bye weeks came in week 6 and 12 (October 5 and November 16, respectively).

As Texas was one of two new members of the SEC that joined in July 2024, the Bulldogs played the Longhorns for the first time since the 1998 season at the 1999 Cotton Bowl Classic. Mississippi State travelled to Austin, Texas for the first time since the 1992 season, which the Bulldogs won 28–10. Texas won the 2024 rematch 35-13.

With the two new teams to the SEC (Oklahoma and Texas) and the conference dropping divisions in a new scheduling format, Mississippi State in 2024 did not play notable SEC rivals for the first time in years; Alabama (1947), Auburn (1954), Kentucky (1989) and LSU (1943).

The 2024 season's out-of-conference opponents represented the Big 12, MAC and the United Athletic (UAC) conferences, along with an FBS independent team. The Bulldogs hosted three of their four non–conference games against FCS opponent Eastern Kentucky, Toledo from the MAC, and UMass, who was an FBS independent. The Bulldogs travelled to Arizona State for the first time in program history on September 7, 2024. The three other non-conference teams that Mississippi State faced in 2024 were also the first ever meetings in program history.

Date	Time	Opponent	Site	TV	Result	Attendance
August 31	5:00 p.m.	Eastern Kentucky*	Davis Wade Stadium; Starkville, MS	SECN+/ESPN+	W 56–7	48,724
September 7	9:30 p.m.	at Arizona State*	Mountain America Stadium; Tempe, AZ	ESPN	L 23–30	45,504
September 14	6:30 p.m.	Toledo*	Davis Wade Stadium; Starkville, MS	ESPNU	L 17–41	47,412
September 21	11:00 a.m.	Florida	Davis Wade Stadium; Starkville, MS	ESPN	L 28–45	49,655
September 28	3:15 p.m.	at No. 1 Texas	Darrell K Royal–Texas Memorial Stadium; Austin, TX	SECN	L 13–35	101,388
October 12	3:15 p.m.	at No. 5 Georgia	Sanford Stadium; Athens, GA	SECN	L 31–41	93,033
October 19	3:15 p.m.	No. 14 Texas A&M	Davis Wade Stadium; Starkville, MS	SECN	L 24–34	50,127
October 26	11:45 a.m.	Arkansas	Davis Wade Stadium; Starkville, MS	SECN	L 25–58	49,303
November 2	3:15 p.m.	UMass*^{†}	Davis Wade Stadium; Starkville, MS	SECN	W 45–20	48,617
November 9	6:00 p.m.	at No. 7 Tennessee	Neyland Stadium; Knoxville, TN	ESPN	L 14–33	101,915
November 23	3:15 p.m.	No. 23 Missouri	Davis Wade Stadium; Starkville, MS	SECN	L 20–39	47,824
November 29	2:30 p.m.	at No. 14 Ole Miss	Vaught–Hemingway Stadium; Oxford, MS (Egg Bowl)	ABC	L 14–26	67,896
*Non-conference game; ^{†}Homecoming; Rankings from AP Poll (and CFP Rankings, after November 1) - Released prior to game; All times are in Central time

== Personnel ==
2024 Mississippi State Bulldogs football team roster
Players
Coaches
Offense

Pos.	#	Name	Class
QB	0	Michael Van Buren Jr.	Fr
WR	1	Kelly Akharaiyi	Sr
QB	2	Blake Shapen (injured) (C)	Sr
WR	3	Kevin Coleman Jr.	Jr
WR	4	J. J. Harrell	Fr
WR	5	Braylon Burnside	Fr
WR	6	Jordan Mosley (C)	Jr
WR	7	Mario Craver	Fr
WR	8	Creed Whittemore	So
WR	9	Ricky Johnson	Fr
TE	10	Cameron Bell	So
WR	11	Jaden Walley	Sr
WR	13	Sanfrisco Magee	Fr
WR	14	Trent Hudson	Sr
QB	15	Jake Weir	Jr
QB	16	Chris Parson	Fr
TE	18	Seydou Traore	Jr
RB	20	Johnnie Daniels	Jr
RB	21	Davon Booth	Sr
RB	22	Xavier Gayten	Fr
RB	23	Seth Davis	So
RB	24	Keyvone Lee	Sr
RB	25	Jeffery Pittman (S)	Sr
RB	28	Brinston Williams	So
RB	32	Wykece Johnson	Jr
RB	35	Javaris Bufford	Jr
TE	39	Josh Washington	Fr
TE	42	Sam Paxton	Jr
TE	47	Semaj Parker	So
OL	51	Luke Work	Fr
OL	52	Grant Jackson	Sr
OL	53	Malik Ellis	So
OL	55	Leon Bell (S)	Jr
OL	56	Wesley Davis	So
OL	58	T. J. Lockhart	Fr
OL	59	Alex Lopez	Fr
OL	61	Karsten Upchurch	Jr
OL	66	Makylan Pounders	Jr
OL	67	Ethan Miner (C)	Sr
OL	68	Bailey Henderson	Jr
OL	72	Canon Boone	Jr
OL	74	Jimothy Lewis Jr.	Fr
OL	75	Jacoby Jackson	Jr
OL	76	Albert Reese IV	Jr
OL	77	Marlon Martinez	Sr
OL	78	Amari Smith	Fr
OL	79	Jackson LaHue	So
WR	80	Kade Kolka	Sr
WR	81	Antonio Harmon	Jr
TE	83	Rayfield Lotten	Fr
TE	84	Justin Ball (C)	Sr
WR	85	Thomas Cheatham	Jr
TE	86	Nick Lauderdale	Sr
WR	87	Logan Flinta	So
TE	88	Jacorey Whitted	Fr

Defense

Pos.	#	Name	Class
LB	0	Fred Clark	Fr
CB	1	Kelley Jones	Fr
S	2	Isaac Smith	So
S	3	Brylan Lanier	Jr
CB	4	DeAngelo Brumfield	Sr
LB	5	John Lewis	Jr
CB	6	Traveon Wright	Fr
LB	7	Stone Blanton	Jr
DL	8	Sulaiman Kpaka	Sr
DL	9	De'Monte Russell	Sr
S	10	Corey Ellington	Sr
LB	11	Ty Cooper	Jr
S	12	Tyler Woodard	Jr
CB	13	Raydarious Jones	Sr
CB	14	Brice Pollock	So
S	15	Kobi Albert	So
LB	16	Zakari Tillman	So
S	17	Jordan Morant	Sr
CB	18	Khamauri Rogers (C)	So
S	19	Cyrus Reyes	Fr
CB	20	Montre Miller	Sr
S	21	Hunter Washington (C)	Jr
DL	22	Kendrick Bingley-Jones (C)	Jr
DL	23	Trevion Williams	Fr
CB	24	Elijah Cannon	Fr
S	25	Vic Sutton	Fr
LB	26	J. P. Purvis (C)	Sr
S	27	Chris Keys Jr.	Jr
S	28	Tanner Johnson	So
S	29	Jatavious Johnson	Fr
LB	30	Marcus Ross	Jr
LB	31	Javae Gilmore	So
CB	32	Nicholas Bargains	So
LB	33	Michael Robinson	Jr
DL	35	Kalvin Dinkins	So
LB	36	Donterry Russell	So
LB	40	Nic Mitchell	Jr
LB	44	Branden Jennings	Jr
LB	45	Josiah Knight	Fr
DL	46	Joseph Head Jr.	Fr
LB	50	T. B. Hinton	Fr
DL	90	Kai McClendon	Fr
DL	91	Deonte Anderson	Jr
DL	92	Eric Taylor (S)	Sr
DL	94	Corey Clark	Jr
DL	95	Gabe Moore	Fr
DL	96	Gavin Nelson	So
DL	97	Terrance Hibbler Jr.	Fr
DL	98	Ashun Sheppard	Jr

Special teams

Pos.	#	Name	Class
LS	43	Hayes Hammond (C)	Sr
K	47	William Wilkinson	Fr
LS	48	Charlie Ingram	Fr
K	49	Marlon Hauck	So
K	80	Kyle Ferrie	So
K	82	Nick Barr-Mira	Sr
P	83	Zach Haynes	Sr
P	88	Ethan Pulliam	Fr
LS	89	Luke Beard	Fr

Head coach

- Jeff Lebby

Coordinators/assistant coaches

- Coleman Hutzler
  Defensive coordinator/Linebackers
- Matt Barnes
  Co-defensive coordinator/Safeties
- Anthony Tucker
  Running backs
- Corey Bell
  Cornerbacks
- Chad Bumphis
  Wide receivers
- Jon Cooper
  Tight ends
- Matt Holecek
  Quarterbacks
- Cody Kennedy
  Offensive line
- Cliff Odom
  Special teams coordinator
- David Turner
  Defensive line
- Alex Jackson
  Offensive quality control
- Ryan McKim
  Offensive analyst
- Tanner Schafer
  Offensive analyst

Legend

- (C) Team captain
- (S) Suspended
- (I) Ineligible
- Injured
- Redshirt

Roster
Last update: September 15, 2024

== Game summaries ==
=== Eastern Kentucky (FCS) ===
Eastern Kentucky Colonels (FCS) at Mississippi State Bulldogs – Game summary

Quarter	1	2	3	4	Total
Colonels (FCS)	0	7	0	0	7
Bulldogs	14	21	7	14	56

at Davis Wade Stadium, Starkville, Mississippi

- Date: August 31
- Game time: 7:00 p.m. CDT
- Game weather: Sunny, 84 °F (29 °C)
- Game attendance: 48,724
- Referee: Wayne Winker
- TV announcers (SECN+/ESPN+): Kevin Fitzgerald (play-by-play) and Charlie Strong (analyst)
- Box score, Recap

Game information
First quarter
- MSST – Jordan Mosley 65-yard pass from Blake Shapen (Kyle Ferrie kick), 14:28. Bulldogs 7–0. Drive: 3 plays, 75 yards, 0:32.
- MSST – Blake Shapen 4-yard run (Kyle Ferrie kick), 11:07. Bulldogs 14–0. Drive: 4 plays, 26 yards, 1:04.

Second quarter

- MSST – Creed Whittemore 41-yard run (Kyle Ferrie kick), 11:01. Bulldogs 21–0. Drive: 5 plays, 47 yards, 2:11.
- MSST – Kevin Coleman Jr. 23-yard pass from Blake Shapen (Kyle Ferrie kick), 7:10. Bulldogs 28–0. Drive: 5 plays, 48 yards, 1:55.
- MSST – Mario Craver 54-yard pass from Blake Shapen (Kyle Ferrie kick), 3:16. Bulldogs 35–0. Drive: 2 plays, 54 yards, 0:13.
- EKU – Ron Vann Jr. 9-yard pass from Matt Morrissey (Patrick Nations kick), 0:03. Bulldogs 35–7. Drive: 14 plays, 75 yards, 3:13.

Third quarter

- MSST – Davon Booth 1-yard run (Kyle Ferrie kick), 7:42. Bulldogs 42–7. Drive: 10 plays, 65 yards, 3:55.

Fourth quarter

- MSST – Mario Craver 0-yard blocked punt return (Kyle Ferrie kick), 6:58. Bulldogs 49–7.
- MSST – Elijah Cannon 51-yard interception return (Kyle Ferrie kick), 4:07. Bulldogs 56–7.

Statistics	EKU	MSST
First downs	16	19
Total yards	295	450
Rushing yards	126	203
Passing yards	169	247
Passing: Comp–Att–Int	22–38–1	15–22–0
Time of possession	38:06	21:54

Team	Category	Player	Statistics
Eastern Kentucky	Passing	Matt Morrissey	22/38, 169 yards, TD, INT
Eastern Kentucky	Rushing	Joshua Carter	19 rushes, 75 yards
Eastern Kentucky	Receiving	Marcus Calwise Jr.	4 receptions, 45 yards
Mississippi State	Passing	Blake Shapen	15/20, 247 yards, 3 TD
Mississippi State	Rushing	Blake Shapen	7 rushes, 44 yards, TD
Mississippi State	Receiving	Jordan Mosley	5 receptions, 104 yards, TD

=== at Arizona State ===
Mississippi State Bulldogs at Arizona State Sun Devils – Game summary

Quarter	1	2	3	4	Total
Bulldogs	0	3	7	13	23
Sun Devils	10	17	3	0	30

at Mountain America Stadium, Tempe, Arizona

- Date: September 7
- Game time: 9:30 p.m. CDT/7:30 p.m. MST
- Game weather: Sunny, 101 °F (38 °C)
- Game attendance: 45,504
- Referee: Steve Marlowe
- TV announcers (ESPN): Mark Jones, Roddy Jones and Quint Kessenich
- Box score, Recap

Game information
First quarter
- ASU – Sam Leavitt 7-yard run (Ian Hershey kick), 9:31. Sun Devils 7–0. Drive: 10 plays, 79 yards, 4:11.
- ASU – Ian Hershey 27-yard field goal, 2:00. Sun Devils 10–0. Drive: 12 plays, 60 yards, 6:17.

Second quarter

- MSST – Kyle Ferrie 32-yard field goal, 13:16. Sun Devils 10–3. Drive: 12 plays, 71 yards, 3:44.
- ASU – Ian Hershey 47-yard field goal, 9:33. Sun Devils 13–3. Drive: 9 plays, 45 yards, 3:43.
- ASU – C. J. Fite 1-yard fumble return (Ian Hershey kick), 8:23. Sun Devils 20–3.
- ASU – Sam Leavitt 1-yard run (Ian Hershey kick), 0:34. Sun Devils 27–3. Drive: 11 plays, 68 yards, 5:00.

Third quarter

- ASU – Ian Hershey 46-yard field goal, 6:33. Sun Devils 30–3. Drive: 14 plays, 46 yards, 8:27.
- MSST – Keyvone Lee 6-yard run (Kyle Ferrie kick), 2:29. Sun Devils 30–10. Drive: 12 plays, 75 yards, 4:04.

Fourth quarter

- MSST – Davon Booth 15-yard pass from Blake Shapen (kick failed), 13:09. Sun Devils 30–16. Drive: 8 plays, 50 yards, 2:13.
- MSST – Kevin Coleman Jr. 80-yard pass from Blake Shapen (Kyle Ferrie kick), 5:27. Sun Devils 30–23. Drive: 1 play, 80 yards, 0:13.

Statistics	MSST	ASU
First downs	18	26
Total yards	292	415
Rushing yards	24	346
Passing yards	268	69
Passing: Comp–Att–Int	18–28–0	10–20–0
Time of possession	19:47	40:13

Team	Category	Player	Statistics
Mississippi State	Passing	Blake Shapen	18/28, 268 yards, 2 TD
Mississippi State	Rushing	Keyvone Lee	9 rushes, 35 yards, TD
Mississippi State	Receiving	Kevin Coleman Jr.	4 receptions, 103 yards, TD
Arizona State	Passing	Sam Leavitt	10/20, 69 yards
Arizona State	Rushing	Cam Skattebo	33 rushes, 262 yards
Arizona State	Receiving	Cam Skattebo	3 receptions, 35 yards

=== Toledo ===
Toledo Rockets at Mississippi State Bulldogs – Game summary

Quarter	1	2	3	4	Total
Rockets	7	21	7	6	41
Bulldogs	0	3	7	7	17

at Davis Wade Stadium, Starkville, Mississippi

- Date: September 14
- Game time: 6:30 p.m. CDT
- Game weather: Sunny, 75 °F (24 °C)
- Game attendance: 47,412
- Referee: Daniel Gautreaux
- TV announcers (ESPNU): Jay Alter and Rocky Boiman
- Box score, Recap

Game information
First quarter
- TOL – Junior Vandeross III 4-yard pass from Tucker Gleason (Dylan Cunanan kick), 6:35. Rockets 7–0. Drive: 12 plays, 70 yards, 6:13.

Second quarter

- TOL – Jerjuan Newton 6-yard pass from Tucker Gleason (Dylan Cunanan kick), 13:26. Rockets 14–0. Drive: 6 plays, 61 yards, 1:54.
- MSST – Kyle Ferrie 23-yard field goal, 9:35. Rockets 14–3. Drive: 12 plays, 64 yards, 3:43.
- TOL – Connor Walendzak 1-yard run (Dylan Cunanan kick), 5:09. Rockets 21–3. Drive: 10 plays, 75 yards, 4:26.
- TOL – Willie Shaw III 10-yard run (Dylan Cunanan kick), 1:09. Rockets 28–3. Drive: 9 plays, 78 yards, 2:22.

Third quarter

- TOL – Jerjuan Newton 15-yard pass from Tucker Gleason (Dylan Cunanan kick), 10:05. Rockets 35–3. Drive: 4 plays, 37 yards, 1:56.
- MSST – Mario Craver 9-yard pass from Blake Shapen (Kyle Ferrie kick), 5:40. Rockets 35–10. Drive: 13 plays, 72 yards, 4:18.

Fourth quarter

- TOL – Dylan Cunanan 41-yard field goal, 12:20. Rockets 38–10. Drive: 14 plays, 52 yards, 8:20.
- MSST – Kevin Coleman Jr. 1-yard pass from Blake Shapen (Kyle Ferrie kick), 6:11. Rockets 38–17. Drive: 11 plays, 80 yards, 3:39.
- TOL – Dylan Cunanan 23-yard field goal, 1:11. Rockets 41–17. Drive: 8 plays, 44 yards, 4:58.

Statistics	TOL	MSST
First downs	26	21
Total yards	454	385
Rushing yards	169	66
Passing yards	285	319
Passing: Comp–Att–Int	23–28–0	28–39–1
Time of possession	37:04	22:56

Team	Category	Player	Statistics
Toledo	Passing	Tucker Gleason	23/28, 285 yards, 3 TD
Toledo	Rushing	Willie Shaw III	16 rushes, 62 yards, TD
Toledo	Receiving	Junior Vanderos III	7 receptions, 73 yards, TD
Mississippi State	Passing	Blake Shapen	28/39, 319 yards, 2 TD, INT
Mississippi State	Rushing	Johnnie Daniels	10 rushes, 59 yards
Mississippi State	Receiving	Kevin Coleman Jr.	7 receptions, 77 yards, TD

=== Florida ===
Florida Gators at Mississippi State Bulldogs – Game summary

Quarter	1	2	3	4	Total
Gators	7	21	7	10	45
Bulldogs	7	7	7	7	28

at Davis Wade Stadium, Starkville, Mississippi

- Date: September 21
- Game time: 11:00 a.m. CDT
- Game weather: Sunny, 89 °F (32 °C)
- Game attendance: 49,655
- Referee: Wayne Winkler
- TV announcers (ESPN): Dave Pasch, Dusty Dvoracek, and Taylor McGregor
- Box score, Recap

Game information
First quarter
- FLA – Arlis Boardingham 3-yard pass from Graham Mertz (Trey Smack kick), 3:39. Gators 7–0. Drive: 13 plays, 84 yards, 6:17.
- MSU – Davon Booth 1-yard run (Kyle Ferrie kick), 0:21. Tied 7–7. Drive: 9 plays, 62 yards, 3:09.

Second quarter

- FLA – Marcus Burke 20-yard pass from Graham Mertz (Trey Smack kick), 10:56. Gators 14–7. Drive: 7 plays, 65 yards, 2:46.
- FLA – Hayden Hansen 35-yard pass from Graham Mertz (Trey Smack kick), 9:02. Gators 21–7. Drive: 2 plays, 44 yards, 0:34.
- FLA – Ja'Kobi Jackson 10-yard run (Trey Smack kick), 1:17. Gators 28–7. Drive: 10 plays, 91 yards, 2:59.
- MSU – Blake Shapen 3-yard run (Kyle Ferrie kick), 0:23. Gators 28–14. Drive: 6 plays, 75 yards, 0:54.

Third quarter

- MSU – Jordan Mosley 13-yard pass from Blake Shapen (Kyle Ferrie kick), 6:38. Gators 28–21. Drive: 13 plays, 76 yards, 6:43.
- FLA – Graham Mertz 1-yard run (Trey Smack kick), 3:37. Gators 35–21. Drive: 8 plays, 75 yards, 3:01.

Fourth quarter

- FLA – Austin Barner 0-yard run (Trey Smack kick), 8:24. Gators 42–21. Drive: 10 plays, 93 yards, 5:49.
- MSU – Johnnie Daniels 10-yard run (Kyle Ferrie kick), 4:26. Gators 42–28. Drive: 12 plays, 75 yards, 3:58.
- FLA – Trey Smack 47-yard field goal, 2:34. Gators 45–28. Drive: 6 plays, 21 yards, 1:50.

Statistics	UF	MSST
First downs	27	31
Total yards	503	480
Rushing yards	226	240
Passing yards	277	240
Passing: Comp–Att–Int	26–28–0	20–34–0
Time of possession	27:36	32:24

Team	Category	Player	Statistics
Florida	Passing	Graham Mertz	19/21, 201 yards, 3 TD
Florida	Rushing	Montrell Johnson Jr.	15 rushes, 68 yards
Florida	Receiving	Elijhah Badger	3 receptions, 45 yards
Mississippi State	Passing	Blake Shapen	13/21, 140 yards, TD
Mississippi State	Rushing	Johnnie Daniels	14 rushes, 77 yards, TD
Mississippi State	Receiving	Mario Craver	3 receptions, 62 yards

Starting quarterback Blake Shapen suffered a shoulder injury in the fourth quarter and was replaced by true freshman Michael Van Buren Jr. for the rest of the game. Head coach Jeff Lebby later announced that Shapen would be out for the rest of the season.

=== at No. 1 Texas ===
Mississippi State Bulldogs at No. 1 Texas Longhorns – Game summary

Quarter	1	2	3	4	Total
Bulldogs	0	6	0	7	13
No. 1 Longhorns	7	7	7	14	35

at Darrell K Royal–Texas Memorial Stadium, Austin, Texas

- Date: September 28
- Game time: 3:15 p.m. CDT
- Game weather: Sunny, 93 °F (34 °C)
- Game attendance: 101,388
- Referee: Ken Williamson
- TV announcers (SECN): Tom Hart, Cole Cubelic, and Alyssa Lang
- Box score, Recap

Game information
First quarter
- TEX – Jaydon Blue 1-yard run (Bert Auburn kick), 6:06. Longhorns 7–0. Drive: 5 plays, 72 yards, 1:46.

Second quarter

- MSST – Kyle Ferrie 45-yard field goal, 9:24. Longhorns 7–3. Drive: 7 plays, 10 yards, 3:11.
- MSST – Kyle Ferrie 32-yard field goal, 1:56. Longhorns 7–6. Drive: 10 plays, 64 yards, 5:34.
- TEX – DeAndre Moore Jr. 49-yard pass from Arch Manning (Bert Auburn kick), 0:29. Longhorns 14–6. Drive: 8 plays, 75 yards, 1:27.

Third quarter

- TEX – Arch Manning 1-yard run (Bert Auburn kick), 0:00. Longhorns 21–6. Drive: 10 plays, 75 yards, 5:22.

Fourth quarter

- TEX – DeAndre Moore Jr. 27-yard pass from Arch Manning (Bert Auburn kick), 9:30. Longhorns 28–6. Drive: 8 plays, 85 yards, 3:08.
- MSST – Michael Van Buren 12-yard run (Kyle Ferrie kick), 6:12. Longhorns 28–13. Drive: 7 plays, 75 yards, 3:18.
- TEX – Isaiah Bond 26-yard run (Bert Auburn kick), 3:03. Longhorns 35–13. Drive: 8 plays, 72 yards, 3:09.

Statistics	MSST	TEX
First downs	19	21
Total yards	294	522
Rushing yards	150	198
Passing yards	144	324
Passing: Comp–Att–Int	12–23–0	26–31–0
Time of possession	34:57	25:03

Team	Category	Player	Statistics
Mississippi State	Passing	Michael Van Buren Jr.	12/23, 144 yards
Mississippi State	Rushing	Johnnie Daniels	15 rushes, 75 yards
Mississippi State	Receiving	Kevin Coleman Jr.	6 receptions, 57 yards
Texas	Passing	Arch Manning	26/31, 324 yards, 2 TD
Texas	Rushing	Quintrevion Wisner	13 rushes, 88 yards
Texas	Receiving	DeAndre Moore Jr.	4 receptions, 103 yards, 2 TD

=== at No. 5 Georgia ===
Mississippi State Bulldogs at No. 5 Georgia Bulldogs – Game summary

Quarter	1	2	3	4	Total
Mississippi State	3	7	14	7	31
No. 5 Georgia	10	17	7	7	41

at Sanford Stadium, Athens, Georgia

- Date: October 12
- Game time: 3:15 p.m. CDT
- Game weather: Sunny, 77 °F (25 °C)
- Game attendance: 93,033
- Referee: Kyle Olson
- TV announcers (SECN): Taylor Zarzour, Matt Stinchcomb, and Alyssa Lang
- Box score, Recap

Game information
First quarter
- MSST – Kyle Ferrie 47-yard field goal, 12:05. Mississippi State 3–0. Drive: 4 plays, -3 yards, 1:24.
- UGA – Peyton Woodring 45-yard field goal, 7:09. Tied 3–3. Drive: 10 plays, 38 yards, 4:56.
- UGA – Branson Robinson 5-yard run (Peyton Woodring kick), 2:13. Georgia 10–3. Drive: 8 plays, 81 yards, 3:21.

Second quarter

- UGA – Peyton Woodring 32-yard field goal, 10:51. Georgia 13–3. Drive: 13 plays, 51 yards, 5:22.
- MSST – Kelly Akharaiyi 24-yard pass from Michael Van Buren Jr. (Kyle Ferrie kick), 8:46. Georgia 13–10. Drive: 4 plays, 75 yards, 2:05.
- UGA – Dillon Bell 31-yard pass from Carson Beck (Peyton Woodring kick), 6:32. Georgia 20–10. Drive: 5 plays, 75 yards, 2:14.
- UGA – Lawson Luckie 1-yard pass from Carson Beck (Peyton Woodring kick), 1:56. Georgia 27–10. Drive: 6 plays, 80 yards, 2:54.

Third quarter

- UGA – Arian Smith 42-yard pass from Carson Beck (Peyton Woodring kick), 13:48. Georgia 34–10. Drive: 3 plays, 75 yards, 1:12.
- MSST – Johnnie Daniels 19-yard run (Kyle Ferrie kick), 8:27. Georgia 34–17. Drive: 8 plays, 75 yards, 5:21.
- MSST – Davon Booth 2-yard pass from Michael Van Buren Jr. (Kyle Ferrie kick), 2:40. Georgia 34–24. Drive: 8 plays, 80 yards, 3:56.

Fourth quarter

- UGA – Trevor Etienne 1-yard run (Peyton Woodring kick), 3:33. Georgia 41–24. Drive: 16 plays, 81 yards, 7:26.
- MSST – Kelly Akharaiyi 35-yard pass from Michael Van Buren Jr. (Kyle Ferrie kick), 1:47. Georgia 41–31. Drive: 9 plays, 75 yards, 1:46.

Statistics	MSST	UGA
First downs	17	28
Total yards	385	605
Rushing yards	79	146
Passing yards	306	459
Passing: Comp–Att–Int	20–37–1	36–48–2
Time of possession	26:22	33:38

Team	Category	Player	Statistics
Mississippi State	Passing	Michael Van Buren Jr.	20/37, 306 yards, 3 TD, INT
Mississippi State	Rushing	Davon Booth	10 rushes, 32 yards
Mississippi State	Receiving	Kevin Coleman Jr.	8 receptions, 103 yards
Georgia	Passing	Carson Beck	36/48, 459 yards, 3 TD, 2 INT
Georgia	Rushing	Anthony Evans III	1 rush, 52 yards
Georgia	Receiving	Arian Smith	5 receptions, 134 yards, TD

=== No. 14 Texas A&M ===
No. 14 Texas A&M Aggies at Mississippi State Bulldogs – Game summary

Quarter	1	2	3	4	Total
No. 14 Aggies	7	14	10	3	34
Bulldogs	7	10	0	7	24

at Davis Wade Stadium, Starkville, Mississippi

- Date: October 19
- Game time: 3:15 p.m. CDT
- Game weather: Sunny, 74 °F (23 °C)
- Game attendance: 50,127
- Referee: Jason Autrey
- TV announcers (SECN): Taylor Zarzour, Matt Stinchcomb, and Ashley Stroehlein

Game information
First quarter
- MSST – Davon Booth 14-yard pass from Michael Van Buren Jr. (Kyle Ferrie kick), 9:36. Bulldogs 7–0. Drive: 12 plays, 92 yards, 5:13.
- TAMU – Noah Thomas 20-yard pass from Conner Weigman (Randy Bond kick), 2:41. Tied 7–7. Drive: 13 plays, 74 yards, 6:49.

Second quarter

- TAMU – Le'Veon Moss 9-yard run (Randy Bond kick), 10:29. Aggies 14–7. Drive: 7 plays, 81 yards, 2:36.
- MSST – Kyle Ferrie 24-yard field goal, 6:30. Aggies 14–10. Drive: 9 plays, 69 yards, 3:59.
- TAMU – Amari Daniels 6-yard run (Randy Bond kick), 1:48. Aggies 21–10. Drive: 4 plays, 28 yards, 1:43.
- MSST – Mario Craver 4-yard pass from Michael Van Buren Jr. (Kyle Ferrie kick), 0:21. Aggies 21–17. Drive: 8 plays, 75 yards, 1:27.

Third quarter

- TAMU – Randy Bond 28-yard field goal, 7:10. Aggies 24–17. Drive: 17 plays, 64 yards, 7:50.
- TAMU – Le'Veon Moss 3-yard run (Randy Bond kick), 3:24. Aggies 31–17. Drive: 4 plays, 32 yards, 1:59.

Fourth quarter

- MSST – Kevin Coleman Jr. 12-yard pass from Michael Van Buren Jr. (Kyle Ferrie kick), 13:41. Aggies 31–24. Drive: 3 plays, 12 yards, 1:14.
- TAMU – Randy Bond 44-yard field goal, 6:13. Aggies 34–24. Drive: 7 plays, 41 yards, 3:42.

Statistics	TAMU	MSST
First downs	17	22
Total yards	353	367
Rushing yards	136	125
Passing yards	217	242
Passing: Comp–Att–Int	15–25–2	22–41–1
Time of possession	30:08	29:52

Team	Category	Player	Statistics
Texas A&M	Passing	Conner Weigman	15/25, 217 yards, TD, 2 INT
Texas A&M	Rushing	Le'Veon Moss	17 carries, 65 yards, 2 TD
Texas A&M	Receiving	Jabre Barber	6 receptions, 92 yards
Mississippi State	Passing	Michael Van Buren Jr.	22/41, 242 yards, 3 TD, INT
Mississippi State	Rushing	Davon Booth	12 carries, 79 yards
Mississippi State	Receiving	Kevin Coleman Jr.	8 receptions, 89 yards, TD

=== Arkansas ===
Arkansas Razorbacks at Mississippi State Bulldogs – Game summary

Quarter	1	2	3	4	Total
Razorbacks	17	14	10	17	58
Bulldogs	7	3	15	0	25

at Davis Wade Stadium, Starkville, Mississippi

- Date: October 26
- Game time: 11:45 a.m. CDT
- Game weather: Sunny, 80 °F (27 °C)
- Game attendance: 49,303
- Referee: Lee Headrick
- TV announcers (SECN): Dave Neal, Aaron Murray, and Ashley ShahAhmadi

Game information
First quarter
- ARK – Taylen Green 8-yard run (Matthew Shipley kick), 13:06. Razorbacks 7–0. Drive: 3 plays, 23 yards, 1:20.
- MSST – Davon Booth 54-yard pass from Michael Van Buren Jr. (Kyle Ferrie kick), 11:45. Tied 7–7. Drive: 5 plays, 75 yards, 1:21.
- ARK – Matthew Shipley 27-yard field goal, 8:50. Razorbacks 10–7. Drive: 7 plays, 66 yards, 2:55.
- ARK – Luke Hasz 14-yard pass from Taylen Green (Matthew Shipley kick), 2:09. Razorbacks 17–7. Drive: 6 plays, 78 yards, 3:17.

Second quarter

- ARK – Jordan Anthony 27-yard pass from Taylen Green (Matthew Shipley kick), 10:50. Razorbacks 24–7. Drive: 5 plays, 76 yards, 1:54.
- MSST – Kyle Ferrie 36-yard field goal, 1:54. Razorbacks 24–10. Drive: 6 plays, 30 yards, 1:16.
- ARK – Andreas Paaske 1-yard pass from Taylen Green (Matthew Shipley kick), 0:16. Razorbacks 31–10. Drive: 8 plays, 75 yards, 1:38.

Third quarter

- ARK – Matthew Shipley 32-yard field goal, 11:23. Razorbacks 34–10. Drive: 7 plays, 62 yards, 3:37.
- ARK – Andreas Paaske 7-yard pass from Taylen Green (Matthew Shipley kick), 6:51. Razorbacks 41–10. Drive: 7 plays, 62 yards, 3:42.
- MSST – Kevin Coleman Jr. 31-yard pass from Michael Van Buren Jr. (Kyle Ferrie kick), 4:40. Razorbacks 41–17. Drive: 6 plays, 75 yards, 2:11.
- MSST – Michael Van Buren Jr. 4-yard run (Michael Van Buren Jr. pass to Kelly Akharaiyi), 3:57. Razorbacks 41–25. Drive: 2 plays, 35 yards, 0:27.

Fourth quarter

- ARK – Matthew Shipley 29-yard field goal, 14:04. Razorbacks 44–25. Drive: 10 plays, 64 yards, 4:53.
- ARK – Luke Hasz 15-yard pass from Taylen Green (Matthew Shipley kick), 5:51. Razorbacks 51–25. Drive: 5 plays, 99 yards, 3:09.
- ARK – Rashod Dubinion 3-yard run (Matthew Shipley kick), 4:50. Razorbacks 58–25. Drive: 2 plays, 12 yards, 0:52.

Statistics	ARK	MSST
First downs	29	24
Total yards	673	471
Rushing yards	359	162
Passing yards	314	309
Passing: Comp–Att–Int	23–29–1	22–31–2
Time of possession	31:15	28:45

Team	Category	Player	Statistics
Arkansas	Passing	Taylen Green	23/29, 314 yards, 5 TD, INT
Arkansas	Rushing	Braylen Russell	16 rushes, 175 yards
Arkansas	Receiving	Andrew Armstrong	4 receptions, 76 yards
Mississippi State	Passing	Michael Van Buren Jr.	22/31, 309 yards, 2 TD, 2 INT
Mississippi State	Rushing	Davon Booth	17 rushes, 93 yards
Mississippi State	Receiving	Kevin Coleman Jr.	8 receptions, 100 yards, TD

=== UMass ===
UMass Minutemen at Mississippi State Bulldogs – Game summary

Quarter	1	2	3	4	Total
Minutemen	10	0	0	10	20
Bulldogs	0	21	14	10	45

at Davis Wade Stadium, Starkville, Mississippi

- Date: November 2
- Game time: 3:15 p.m. CDT
- Game weather: Sunny, 77 °F (25 °C)
- Game attendance: 48,617
- Referee: David Smith
- TV announcers (SECN): Dave Neal, Aaron Murray and Ashley ShahAhmadi
- Box score, Recap

Game information
First quarter
- MASS – Brandon Campbell 3-yard run (Jacob Lurie kick), 7:23. Minutemen 7–0. Drive: 13 plays, 76 yards, 6:32.
- MASS – Jacob Lurie 24-yard field goal, 1:13. Minutemen 10–0. Drive: 8 plays, 37 yards, 4:14.

Second quarter

- MSST – Michael Van Buren Jr. 4-yard run (Kyle Ferrie kick), 14:27. Minutemen 10–7. Drive: 7 plays, 58 yards, 1:38.
- MSST – Seydou Traore 19-yard pass from Michael Van Buren Jr. (Kyle Ferrie kick), 9:05. Bulldogs 14–10. Drive: 6 plays, 97 yards, 2:11.
- MSST – Michael Van Buren Jr. 2-yard run (Kyle Ferrie kick), 1:56. Bulldogs 21–10. Drive: 11 plays, 80 yards, 4:19.

Third quarter

- MSST – Johnnie Daniels 36-yard run (Kyle Ferrie kick), 11:11. Bulldogs 28–10. Drive: 5 plays, 68 yards, 1:47.
- MSST – Davon Booth 30-yard run (Kyle Ferrie kick), 3:25. Bulldogs 35–10. Drive: 6 plays, 80 yards, 1:58.

Fourth quarter

- MASS – Jacob Lurie 35-yard field goal, 12:05. Bulldogs 35–13. Drive: 12 plays, 58 yards, 6:20.
- MSST – Kyle Ferrie 24-yard field goal, 10:17. Bulldogs 38–13. Drive: 7 plays, 69 yards, 1:48.
- MSST – Xavier Gayten 72-yard run (Kyle Ferrie kick), 6:51. Bulldogs 45–13. Drive: 2 plays, 78 yards, 0:35.
- MASS – Jakobie Keeney-James 4-yard pass from A. J. Hairston (Jacob Lurie kick), 0:17. Bulldogs 45–20. Drive: 13 plays, 75 yards, 6:34.

Statistics	MASS	MSST
First downs	25	26
Total yards	335	463
Rushing yards	199	241
Passing yards	136	222
Passing: Comp–Att–Int	17–29–1	14–25–0
Time of possession	40:49	19:11

Team	Category	Player	Statistics
UMass	Passing	A. J. Hairston	7/11, 62 yards, TD
UMass	Rushing	Brandon Campbell	10 rushes, 64 yards, TD
UMass	Receiving	Jakobie Keeney-James	4 receptions, 29 yards, TD
Mississippi State	Passing	Michael Van Buren Jr.	14/25, 222 yards, TD
Mississippi State	Rushing	Johnnie Daniels	6 rushes, 92 yards, TD
Mississippi State	Receiving	Jordan Mosley	4 receptions, 107 yards

=== at No. 7 Tennessee ===
Mississippi State Bulldogs at No. 7 Tennessee Volunteers – Game summary

Quarter	1	2	3	4	Total
Bulldogs	0	7	7	0	14
No. 7 Volunteers	7	13	10	3	33

at Neyland Stadium, Knoxville, Tennessee

- Date: November 9
- Game time: 6:00 p.m. CDT
- Game weather: Cloudy • Temperature: 64 °F (18 °C) • Wind: E 3 miles per hour (4.8 km/h)
- Game attendance: 101,915
- Referee: Wayne Winkler
- TV announcers (ESPN): Dave Pasch, Dusty Dvoracek, and Taylor McGregor

Game information

First quarter

- (11:44) TEN – Squirrel White 34-yard pass from Nico Iamaleava, Max Gilbert kick (Drive: 7 plays, 55 yards, 2:34; Tennessee 7–0)

Second quarter

- (13:35) TEN – Dont'e Thornton Jr. 73-yard pass from Nico Iamaleava, Max Gilbert kick (Drive: 1 play, 73 yards, 0:12; Tennessee 14–0)
- (5:47) MIS – Davon Booth 1-yard run, Kyle Ferrie kick (Drive: 16 plays, 75 yards, 7:48; Tennessee 14–7)
- (0:46) TEN – Max Gilbert 24-yard field goal (Drive: 15 plays, 64 yards, 4:53; Tennessee 17–7)
- (0:00) TEN – Max Gilbert 38-yard field goal (Drive: 3 plays, 26 yards, 0:14; Tennessee 20–7)

Third quarter

- (7:59) TEN – Max Gilbert 51-yard field goal (Drive: 6 plays, 32 yards, 3:09; Tennessee 23–7)
- (6:22) MIS – Johnnie Daniels 18-yard run, Kyle Ferrie kick (Drive: 4 plays, 65 yards, 1:37; Tennessee 23–14)
- (3:31) TEN – Dylan Sampson 33-yard run, Max Gilbert kick (Drive: 7 plays, 75 yards, 2:51; Tennessee 30–14)

Fourth quarter

- (8:14) TEN – Max Gilbert 38-yard field goal (Drive: 15 plays, 67 yards, 7:54; Tennessee 33–14)

Statistics	MSST	TENN
First downs	15	25
Total yards	271	452
Rushing yards	179	240
Passing yards	92	212
Passing: Comp–Att–Int	10–26–1	13–21–0
Time of possession	25:42	34:18

Team	Category	Player	Statistics
Mississippi State	Passing	Michael Van Buren Jr.	10/26, 92 yards, INT
Mississippi State	Rushing	Davon Booth	20 carries, 125 yards, TD
Mississippi State	Receiving	Kevin Coleman Jr.	5 receptions, 68 yards
Tennessee	Passing	Nico Iamaleava	8/13, 174 yards, 2 TD
Tennessee	Rushing	Dylan Sampson	30 carries, 149 yards, TD
Tennessee	Receiving	Dont'e Thornton Jr.	3 receptions, 104 yards, TD

=== No. 23 Missouri ===
No. 23 Missouri Tigers at Mississippi State Bulldogs – Game summary

Quarter	1	2	3	4	Total
No. 23 Tigers	14	14	3	8	39
Bulldogs	10	3	7	0	20

at Davis Wade Stadium, Starkville, Mississippi

- Date: November 23
- Game time: 3:15 p.m.
- Game weather: Sunny • Temperature: 59 °F (15 °C) • Wind: N 2 miles per hour (3.2 km/h)
- Game attendance: 47,824
- Referee: David Smith
- TV announcers (SECN): Taylor Zarzour, Matt Stinchcomb, and Alyssa Lang

Game information

First quarter

- (11:42) MSU: Kyle Ferrie 38 yard Field Goal. 3-0 Mississippi State
- (6:33) MIZ: Daylan Carnell 68 yard Fumble Return (Blake Craig Kick). 7-3 Missouri
- (2:49) MIZ: Marcus Carroll 2 yard run (Blake Craig Kick). 14-3 Missouri
- (0:20) MSU: Jordan Mosley 11 yard pass from Michael Van Buren Jr. (Kyle Ferrie Kick). 14-10 Missouri

Second quarter

- (9:58) MIZ: Luther Burden III 28 yard pass from Brady Cook (Blake Craig Kick). 21-10 Missouri
- (4:32) MIZ: Marcus Carroll 19 yard run (Blake Craig Kick). 28-10 Missouri
- (0:30) MSU: Kyle Ferrie 26 yard Field Goal. 28-13 Missouri

Third quarter

- (6:14) MIZ: Blake Craig 35 yard Field Goal. 31-13 Missouri
- (5:31) MSU: Davon Booth 43 yard run (Kyle Ferrie Kick). 31-20 Missouri

Fourth quarter

- (5:40) MIZ: Marcus Carroll 1 yard run (Marcus Carroll run for two-point conversion). 39-20 Missouri

Statistics	MIZZ	MSST
First downs	24	16
Total yards	472	338
Rushing yards	204	147
Passing yards	268	191
Passing: Comp–Att–Int	15–20–0	16–28–0
Time of possession	41:51	18:09

Team	Category	Player	Statistics
Missouri	Passing	Brady Cook	15/20, 268 yards, TD
Missouri	Rushing	Nate Noel	25 carries, 95 yards
Missouri	Receiving	Luther Burden III	7 receptions, 91 yards, TD
Mississippi State	Passing	Michael Van Buren Jr.	16/28, 191 yards, TD
Mississippi State	Rushing	Davon Booth	12 carries, 124 yards, TD
Mississippi State	Receiving	Kelly Akharaiyi	3 receptions, 64 yards

=== at No. 14 Ole Miss (Egg Bowl) ===
Mississippi State Bulldogs at No. 14 Ole Miss Rebels – Game summary

Quarter	1	2	3	4	Total
Bulldogs	14	0	0	0	14
No. 14 Rebels	10	7	3	6	26

at Vaught–Hemingway Stadium, Oxford, Mississippi

- Date: November 29
- Game time: 2:30 p.m. CST
- Game weather: Sunny, 47 °F (8 °C)
- Game attendance: 67,896
- Referee: Wayne Winkler
- TV announcers (ABC): Tom Hart, Louis Riddick, and Kris Budden

Game information

First quarter

- (12:43) Ole Miss – Caden Davis 39 Yd Field Goal (Drive: 6 plays, 12 yards, 1:46; Ole Miss 3–0)
- (7:54) Mississippi State – Kevin Coleman Jr. 34 Yd pass from Michael Van Buren Jr. (Kyle Ferrie Kick) (Drive: 11 plays, 75 yards, 4:49; Mississippi State 7–3)
- (2:16) Ole Miss – JJ Pegues 5 Yd Run (Caden Davis Kick) (Drive: 13 plays, 75 yards, 5:38; Ole Miss 10–7)
- (0:00) Mississippi State – Michael Van Buren Jr. 6 Yd Run (Kyle Ferrie Kick) (Drive: 6 plays, 75 yards, 2:16; Mississippi State 14–10)

Second quarter

- (8:40) Ole Miss – Ulysses Bentley IV 89 Yd Run (Caden Davis Kick) (Drive: 1 play, 89 yards, 0:15; Ole Miss 17–14)

Third quarter

- (8:40) Ole Miss – Caden Davis 43 Yd Field Goal (Drive: 4 plays, -2 yards, 0:43; Ole Miss 20–14)

Fourth quarter

- (9:56) Ole Miss – Caden Prieskorn 19 Yd pass from Jaxson Dart (Two-Point Pass Conversion Failed) (Drive: 10 plays, 87 yards, 4:52; Ole Miss 26–14)

Statistics	MSST	MISS
First downs	16	21
Total yards	63–330	75–397
Rushing yards	30–39	51–254
Passing yards	291	143
Passing: Comp–Att–Int	18–33–2	14–24–0
Time of possession	28:17	31:43

Team	Category	Player	Statistics
Mississippi State	Passing	Michael Van Buren, Jr.	17/32, 280 yards, TD, 2 INT
Mississippi State	Rushing	Davon Booth	16 carries, 38 yards
Mississippi State	Receiving	Kevin Coleman, Jr.	6 receptions, 118 yards, TD
Ole Miss	Passing	Jaxson Dart	14/24, 143 yards, TD
Ole Miss	Rushing	Ulysses Bentley IV	20 carries, 136 yards, TD
Ole Miss	Receiving	Caden Prieskorn	4 receptions, 53 yards, TD
