= Ethan Pulliam =

American football player (born 2004)

No. 8 – Mississippi State Bulldogs
- Position: Punter
- Class: Redshirt Junior

Personal information
- Born: October 4, 2004 (age 22)
- Listed height: 6 ft 1 in (1.85 m)
- Listed weight: 190 lb (86 kg)

Career information
- High school: Starkville (Starkville, Mississippi)
- College: Mississippi State (2024–present)
- Stats at ESPN

Ethan Christopher Pulliam (born October 4, 2004) is an American college football punter for the Mississippi State Bulldogs. He previously played college baseball for the Bulldogs as well.

== Early life ==
Pulliam was born on October 4, 2004. (Note: His Baseball Reference profile lists his birthplace as Amory, Mississippi, while his Mississippi State bio lists it at Starkville, Mississippi.) He grew up in Starkville, Mississippi, and played baseball and soccer from a young age.

Pulliam attended Starkville High School in Starkville, Mississippi. He was a three-sport athlete at Starkville, excelling in football, baseball, and soccer. Pulliam began playing football as a sophomore. He was invited to join the team by the team's coach, who was made aware of his strong leg. As a senior, Pulliam had 36 punts for an average of 46.1 yards per punt, (Note: He was also reported as having 38 punters for 45.8 yards per punt.) helping his team win the Class 6A state championship. He was a first-team large school all-state selection by the Clarion Ledger and earned All-American honorable mention from Kohl's Kicking.

Pulliam played varsity baseball at Starkville starting in the eighth grade. He was able to play as a pitcher, infielder, or outfielder. As a senior, Pulliam batted .458 with six home runs and 28 runs batted in (RBI). (Note: He was also reported as having a .466 batting average.) He was selected to play in both the Crossroads Diamond Club Class 5A/6A All-Star Game and the NEMCABB 5A/6A All-Star Game, and garnered second-team all-state honors from the Clarion Ledger. Pulliam also played soccer. As a sophomore, he came off the bench to score a second-half hat-trick in a 3–0 win.

=== Recruiting ===
Pulliam was rated as a five-star recruit by Kohl's Kicking. The outlet also ranked him as the ninth-best punter prospect in the class of 2023. Pulliam was also ranked as the 18th-best baseball prospect in Mississippi in the 2023 class by Perfect Game USA. He committed to playing college baseball at Mississippi State University (MSU) for the Bulldogs on March 8, 2020, the same day he was offered a scholarship. In October, Pulliam stated that he was in discussions with MSU's football team. On December 12, he announced that he was signing with MSU to play both sports.

== College career ==
As a freshman, Pulliam took a break from football during the 2023 season. Instead, he played 27 games on the 2024 MSU baseball team. Pulliam made 16 starts at second base, three in right field, and one as designated hitter. He posted a .227 batting average with 15 hits, five doubles, one home run, and 11 RBI. Pulliam hit his first career home run on May 12, 2024, against Arkansas at Baum–Walker Stadium. He joined the football team for 2024 spring camp, which he balanced with the end of the baseball season. That summer, Pulliam played with the High Point-Thomasville HiToms of the Coastal Plain League. He appeared in 27 games and posted a .278 batting average with one home run, three doubles, 10 RBI, and nine steals.

Pulliam entered the 2024 football season as MSU's third-string punter. He did not appear in any games and was redshirted. Pulliam returned to the baseball team for his sophomore season in 2025. However, his playing time was limited due to a crowded second base and outfield. Pulliam played in seven games and he had two hits in six at-bats. He recorded his first career triple in his lone start of the season versus Missouri State. That spring, Pulliam decided to leave the baseball team to focus on football full-time. He had a strong showing in the 2025 spring game, drawing praise from head coach Jeff Lebby.

Pulliam was named the starting punter ahead of the 2025 season. He initially split time at the position with Nathan Tyice, but eventually took over the role full-time. Pulliam appeared in all 13 games and had 45 punts for 2,104 yards. His average of 46.8 yards per punt broke the program record of 46.5 yards per punt, which was set by Andy Russ in 1996. Pulliam registered a season-long 67-yard punt against Tennessee, which was downed on the one-yard line. He was a third-team All-Southeastern Conference (SEC) selection by Phil Steele and a second-team All-America selection by The Sporting News.

== Personal life ==
Pulliam has two cousins who also played football at Mississippi State (CoEric Riley and Mark McLaurin) and three cousins who have played pro football: A. J. Green, Tom Johnson, and Alonzo Lawrence.

Despite punting with his left foot, Pulliam is right-handed. He considers Deion Sanders, who also played football and baseball, one of his idols.
