= Michael Van Buren Jr. =

American football player (born 2004)

No. 3 – South Florida Bulls
- Position: Quarterback
- Class: Junior

Personal information
- Born: July 11, 2004 (age 22)
- Listed height: 6 ft 0 in (1.83 m)
- Listed weight: 195 lb (88 kg)

Career information
- High school: St. Frances Academy (Baltimore, Maryland)
- College: Mississippi State (2024); LSU (2025); South Florida (2026–present)
- Stats at ESPN

Michael Van Buren Jr. (born July 11, 2004) is an American college football quarterback for the South Florida Bulls. He previously played for the Mississippi State Bulldogs and LSU Tigers.

== Early life ==
Van Buren attended Saint Frances Academy in Baltimore, Maryland. As a junior, he threw for 1,707 yards and 18 touchdowns. After originally committing to Oregon, Van Buren flipped his commitment to play college football at Mississippi State University.

== College career ==
Van Buren began his freshman season as the backup to Blake Shapen. After a season-ending injury to Shapen, Van Buren was named Mississippi State's starting quarterback against Texas. In his first career start, he threw for 144 yards and rushed for a touchdown in a 35–13 defeat. Against Georgia, Van Buren threw for 306 yards and three touchdowns in a 41–31 loss. Against UMass, he threw for 222 yards and a touchdown, while also rushing for an additional two touchdowns, in a 45–20 victory, his first career win as a starter. As a true freshman, Van Buren started in eight games, throwing for 1,886 yards and totaling 16 touchdowns. On December 10, 2024, he announced his decision to enter the transfer portal.

On December 15, 2024, Van Buren announced his decision to transfer to Louisiana State University to play for the LSU Tigers. He entered the 2025 season as the backup to Garrett Nussmeier. Against Alabama, Van Buren completed five passes for 52 yards after Nussmeier was benched. He made his first start for the Tigers the following week against Arkansas, throwing for 221 yards and a touchdown in a 23–22 win. On January 3, 2026, Van Buren announced that he would enter the transfer portal for the second time.

On January 6, 2026, Van Buren announced his decision to transfer to the University of South Florida to play for the South Florida Bulls.

=== Statistics ===
| Year | Team | Games | | | Passing | | | | | | | | Rushing | | | |
| Year | Team | GP | GS | Record | Cmp | Att | Pct | Yds | Y/A | TD | Int | Rtg | Att | Yds | Avg | TD |
|---|---|---|---|---|---|---|---|---|---|---|---|---|---|---|---|---|
| 2024 | Mississippi State | 10 | 8 | 1–7 | 140 | 256 | 54.7 | 1,886 | 7.4 | 11 | 7 | 125.3 | 69 | -12 | -0.2 | 5 |
| 2025 | LSU | 7 | 4 | 2–2 | 94 | 151 | 62.3 | 1,010 | 6.7 | 8 | 2 | 133.3 | 48 | 129 | 2.7 | 1 |
| 2026 | South Florida | 8 | 8 | 6–2 | 116 | 181 | 64.1 | 1,273 | 7.0 | 6 | 0 | 134.1 | 52 | 100 | 1.9 | 2 |
| Career | | 25 | 20 | 9−11 | 350 | 588 | 59.5 | 4,169 | 7.1 | 25 | 9 | 130.1 | 169 | 217 | 1.3 | 8 |
