= Darryl Carlton =

American football player (1953–1994)

No. 71, 70
- Position: Offensive tackle

Personal information
- Born: June 24, 1953; Bartow, Florida, U.S.
- Died: April 28, 1994 (aged 40); Tampa, Florida, U.S.
- Listed height: 6 ft 6 in (1.98 m)
- Listed weight: 271 lb (123 kg)

Career information
- High school: Fort Meade (FL)
- College: Tampa
- NFL draft: 1975: 1st round, 23rd overall pick

Career history
- Miami Dolphins (1975–1976); Tampa Bay Buccaneers (1977–1979)

Career NFL statistics
- Games played: 71
- Games started: 36
- Stats at Pro Football Reference

Darryl Marvin Carlton (June 24, 1953 – April 28, 1994) was an American professional football player who was an offensive tackle in the National Football League (NFL). He was a first-round selection (23rd overall pick) in the 1975 NFL draft out of the University of Tampa by the Miami Dolphins. He played for the Dolphins (1975–1976) and the Tampa Bay Buccaneers (1977–1979).
