= Blake Shapen =

American football player (born 2001)

Rhode Island Breakers
- Position: Quarterback
- Roster status: Unsigned draft pick

Personal information
- Born: January 21, 2001 (age 25)
- Listed height: 6 ft 0 in (1.83 m)
- Listed weight: 199 lb (90 kg)

Career information
- High school: Evangel Christian (Shreveport, Louisiana)
- College: Baylor (2020–2023); Mississippi State (2024–2025)
- NFL draft: 2026: undrafted

Career history
- Rhode Island Breakers (2027-present)
- Stats at ESPN

Blake Shapen (born January 21, 2001) is an American football quarterback for the Rhode Island Breakers. He played college football for the Baylor Bears and Mississippi State Bulldogs.

== Early life ==
Shapen grew up in Shreveport, Louisiana and attended Evangel Christian Academy. He passed for 2,049 yards with 24 touchdowns and five interceptions and also rushed for 324 yards with five touchdowns. Shapen committed to play both baseball and football at Arizona State over offers from Ole Miss, Arizona, Louisiana-Lafayette, and Arkansas State, but later de-committed. He later committed to play at Baylor as a two-sport athlete.

== College career ==
Shapen redshirted his true freshman season. He entered his redshirt freshman season as the backup to starting quarterback Gerry Bohanon. Shapen saw his first serious playing time late in the season in a 20–10 win against Kansas State after Bohannon suffered a hamstring injury. He made his first career start the following week against Texas Tech and completed 20 of 34 pass attempts for 254 yards and two touchdowns in a 27–24 victory. Shapen also started the 2021 Big 12 Championship Game and was named the game's MVP after passing for 180 yards and three touchdowns in a 21–16 win over Oklahoma State. He finished the season with a 72.1% completion percentage for 596 yards with five touchdowns and no interceptions.

Shapen won the starting quarterback job for 2022 during spring practices.

On November 27, 2023, Shapen announced that he would be entering the transfer portal. On December 8, he announced that he would be transferring to Mississippi State to play under head coach Jeff Lebby.

On September 21st 2024, Shapen suffered a broken scapula in his right shoulder during the fourth quarter of Mississippi State’s week 4 game against Florida. The injury and subsequent surgery would keep him out for the remainder of the 2024 season. He was also granted a medical redshirt.

Shapen would return for the 2025 season. Despite leading the Bulldogs to an upset win over No. 12 Arizona State in Week 2 and leading the team to a 4–0 start, the Bulldogs would slide to a 5-6 record before Shapen was benched for of the Egg Bowl against rival Ole Miss. The Bulldogs finished with a 5-7 record on the season.

=== Statistics ===
Season	Team	Games			Passing								Rushing			
Season	Team	GP	GS	Record	Cmp	Att	Pct	Yds	Avg	TD	Int	Rtg	Att	Yds	Avg	TD
2020	Baylor	0	0	—	Redshirt											
2021	Baylor	6	2	2–0	62	86	72.1	596	6.9	5	0	149.5	21	59	2.8	0
2022	Baylor	13	13	6–7	233	368	63.3	2,790	7.6	18	10	137.7	76	96	1.3	2
2023	Baylor	8	8	2–6	184	298	61.7	2,188	7.3	13	3	135.8	67	29	0.4	4
2024	Mississippi State	4	4	1–3	74	108	68.5	974	9.0	8	1	166.9	34	36	1.1	2
2025	Mississippi State	11	11	5–6	195	303	64.4	2,433	8.0	15	8	142.9	111	28	0.3	3
Career		42	38	16–22	748	1,163	64.3	8,981	7.7	59	22	142.1	309	248	0.8	11

== Professional career ==
Pre-draft measurables
Height	Weight	Arm length	Hand span	Wingspan	40-yard dash	10-yard split	20-yard split	Vertical jump
6 ft 0 1/8 in (1.83 m)	199 lb (90 kg)	30 in (0.76 m)	8 3/8 in (0.21 m)	6 ft 2 3/8 in (1.89 m)	4.86 s	1.83 s	2.84 s	27.5 in (0.70 m)
All values from Pro Day

=== Rhode Island Breakers ===
On November 19, 2026, Shapen was selected by the Rhode Island Breakers in the 2027 UFL Draft.
