= Laki Tasi =

Samoan-Australian American football player (born 2000s)

No. 68 – Tennessee Titans
- Position: Defensive tackle
- Roster status: Practice squad

Personal information
- Born: October 24, 2003 (age 23); Samoa
- Listed height: 6 ft 6 in (1.98 m)
- Listed weight: 373 lb (169 kg)

Career information
- NFL draft: 2025: undrafted

Career history
- Las Vegas Raiders (2025–2026)*; Tennessee Titans (2026–present)*
- * Offseason or practice squad member only
- Stats at Pro Football Reference

Laki Tasi (born October 24, 2003) is a Samoan-Australian American football defensive tackle for the Tennessee Titans of the National Football League (NFL). Born in Samoa, he grew up in Brisbane, Australia, playing rugby league and rugby union. He switched to American football in 2024 and was selected for the NFL's International Player Pathway (IPP) program.

== Life and career ==
Tasi was born in 2003 or 2004 in Samoa. He was one of seven children and later moved with his family to Australia, where they lived in a three-bedroom house in Brisbane. At age 12, he started playing rugby league for the Goodna Eagles, before later transitioning to rugby union in high school. He weighed 450 pounds (200 kg) but lost about 100 pounds (45 kg) in 2023, then joining the rugby club Queensland Samoa.

Tasi said that around 2022, a family friend who owned a burger shop suggested he switch to American football. Tasi was initially not interested, but the friend suggested it again in 2024 and Tasi decided to try it out. He entered the NFL Academy in Gold Coast, Queensland, and in December 2024, he was chosen for the NFL's International Player Pathway (IPP) program. Becoming a defensive lineman, he trained with fellow IPP member Jordan Petaia at the NFL Asia Pacific Academy before later training with the other IPP members at IMG Academy in the U.S. state of Florida.

Tasi measures at 6 feet 6 inches (1.98 m) and 347 pounds (157 kg), while having an arm length of 34.5 inches, among the longest of defensive linemen eligible for the 2025 NFL draft. NFL analyst Scott Pioli cited Tasi as one of four IPP players to watch at the IMG Academy pro day, noting that he "has very good size and the tools to be a big interior defensive lineman, along with the toughness and makeup to play in the trenches. He possesses a strong and intriguing combination of developmental tools, stature and mindset."

=== Las Vegas Raiders ===
After going unselected in the draft, Tasi signed with the Las Vegas Raiders on April 30, 2025, as an undrafted free agent. He was waived on August 26 as part of final roster cuts and re-signed to the practice squad the next day.

Tasi signed a reserve/future contract with Las Vegas on January 5, 2026. He was waived by the Raiders on July 27.

=== Tennessee Titans ===
On August 2, 2026, Tasi signed with the Tennessee Titans. He was waived by the Titans as a part of final roster cuts on August 30, but re–signed with the team's practice squad the next day.
