= Seydou Traore (American football) =

British-French football player (born 2002)

No. 83 – Miami Dolphins
- Position: Tight end
- Roster status: Active

Personal information
- Born: 12 August 2002 (age 24); France
- Listed height: 6 ft 4 in (1.93 m)
- Listed weight: 242 lb (110 kg)

Career information
- High school: Clearwater Academy (Clearwater, Florida, U.S.)
- College: Arkansas State (2021–2022); Mississippi State (2023–2025)
- NFL draft: 2026: 5th round, 180th overall pick
- CFL draft: 2026G: 2nd round, 16th overall pick

Career history
- Miami Dolphins (2026–present)

Awards and highlights
- First-team All-Sun Belt (2022)
- Stats at Pro Football Reference

Seydou Traore (born 12 August 2002) is an English professional American football tight end for the Miami Dolphins of the National Football League (NFL). Traore played college football for the Arkansas State Red Wolves and Mississippi State Bulldogs and was selected by the Dolphins in the fifth round of the 2026 NFL draft.

== Early life ==
Traore was born in France but raised in London, England, where he grew up playing association football, mainly as a goalkeeper. He is of Algerian and Ivorian origin. After attending the NFL Academy, he moved to Clearwater, Florida, in hopes of getting a Division I scholarship. Traore attended Clearwater Academy as a senior, recording 433 yards and three touchdowns with 26 receptions. A three-star recruit, he committed to play college football at Arkansas State University.

== College career ==
=== Arkansas State ===
After playing sparingly as a freshman in 2021, Traore tallied his first career touchdown against Grambling State, the following year. He finished the season with a total of 50 receptions for 655 yards and four touchdowns. After leading the Sun Belt Conference in receptions, Traore was named to the First-team All-Sun Belt. At the season's end, Traore entered the transfer portal, where he would transfer to the University of Colorado. However, he reentered the transfer portal after just one semester at Colorado.

=== Mississippi State ===
A top ranked transfer, on 8 July 2023, Traore announced he would be transferring to Mississippi State University to play for the Mississippi State Bulldogs. During the 2023 season, Traore was forced to sit out, due to NCAA transfer rules.

=== College statistics ===
Season	Team	GP	Receiving			
Season	Team	GP	Rec	Yds	Avg	TD
2021	Arkansas State	11	12	97	8.1	0
2022	Arkansas State	12	50	655	13.1	4
2023	Mississippi State	DNP				
2024	Mississippi State	12	34	361	10.6	1
2025	Mississippi State	11	30	291	9.7	5
Career		46	126	1,404	11.1	10

== Professional career ==
Pre-draft measurables
Height	Weight	Arm length	Hand span	Wingspan	40-yard dash	10-yard split	20-yard split	20-yard shuttle	Three-cone drill	Vertical jump	Broad jump	Bench press
6 ft 3 3/4 in (1.92 m)	244 lb (111 kg)	33 1/8 in (0.84 m)	9 5/8 in (0.24 m)	6 ft 8 3/8 in (2.04 m)	4.65 s	1.65 s	2.68 s	4.38 s	7.09 s	40.0 in (1.02 m)	10 ft 7 in (3.23 m)	25 reps
All values from HBCU Combine/Pro Day

Traore was selected by the Miami Dolphins in the fifth round (180th overall) in the 2026 NFL draft. He became the first player to be drafted after having graduated from the NFL Academy, and the third to be chosen after having been through the International Player Pathway. Additionally, Traore was drafted in the second round (16th overall) by the BC Lions in the 2026 CFL global draft.
