= Steve Hagen (American football) =

American football coach (born 1961)

Personal information
- Born: September 15, 1961 (age 65); Thousand Oaks, California

Career information
- College: California Lutheran

Career history
- Illinois (1984) Graduate assistant; Kansas (1985–1986) Graduate assistant; Northern Arizona (1987–1988) Wide receivers coach/tight ends coach; Notre Dame (1989–1990) Wide receivers coach; Kent State (1991) Quarterbacks coach; Nevada (1992–1993) Offensive coordinator/quarterbacks coach; UNLV (1994–1995) Offensive coordinator/quarterbacks coach; Wartburg (1996) Head coach; San Jose State (1997–1998) Offensive coordinator/quarterbacks coach; California (1999–2000) Offensive coordinator/quarterbacks coach; Cleveland Browns (2001–2003) Tight ends coach; Cleveland Browns (2004) Quarterbacks coach; Fresno State (2006) Offensive coordinator/quarterbacks coach; North Carolina (2007–2008) Tight ends coach; Cleveland Browns (2009–2012) Tight ends coach; New York Jets (2013–2014) Tight ends coach; New York Jets (2015) Assistant special teams coach; Seattle Dragons (2020) Tight ends coach/Assistant special teams; Guelfi Firenze (2021) Head coach; NFL Academy (2023) Head coach

Steve Hagen (born September 15, 1961) is an American football coach. He served as an assistant coach for the Cleveland Browns and New York Jets.

Hagen has coached football in eleven states and three countries, holding twenty jobs at twelve colleges, two NFL teams, and one XFL team. He began his international coaching journey in 2021 by accepting the head coaching position of Guelfi Firenze of the Italian Football League. In 2023, Hagen was appointed head coach of the NFL Academy, the NFL's international talent development program based in the United Kingdom.

== Head coaching record ==
Year	Team	Overall	Conference	Standing
1996	Wartburg Knights	7–3	5–3	T-3rd
2021	Guelfi Firenze	4-4	-	4th
22 - 2023	NFL Academy	7-1	-	-
23 - 2024	NFL Academy	6-1	-	-
24 - 2025	NFL Academy	2-3	-	-
25 - 2026	NFL Academy	5-3	-	-
