= NFL Academy =

American football youth program

The NFL Academy is an American football youth development program organised by the NFL. It has two locations: one in Loughborough, England, and one in Gold Coast, Queensland, Australia. The academy prepares athletes for American college gridiron football while providing a high school education.

== NFL Academy Europe-Africa ==
NFL Academy Europe-Africa caters to students aged 16 to 19, and was established in 2019 at Barnet and Southgate College in Southgate, London. The initial intake was 90 students, with over 1500 applying. The academy's development was slowed by the COVID-19 pandemic, and it played its first match, against Düsseldorf Panther, in spring 2022. In summer 2022, the academy moved to Loughborough following a tender process, using Loughborough University's sports facilities. Loughborough College provides A-level instruction, accommodation, and pastoral support. In 2023, Steve Hagen was appointed head coach, having previously coached at the Cleveland Browns and New York Jets.

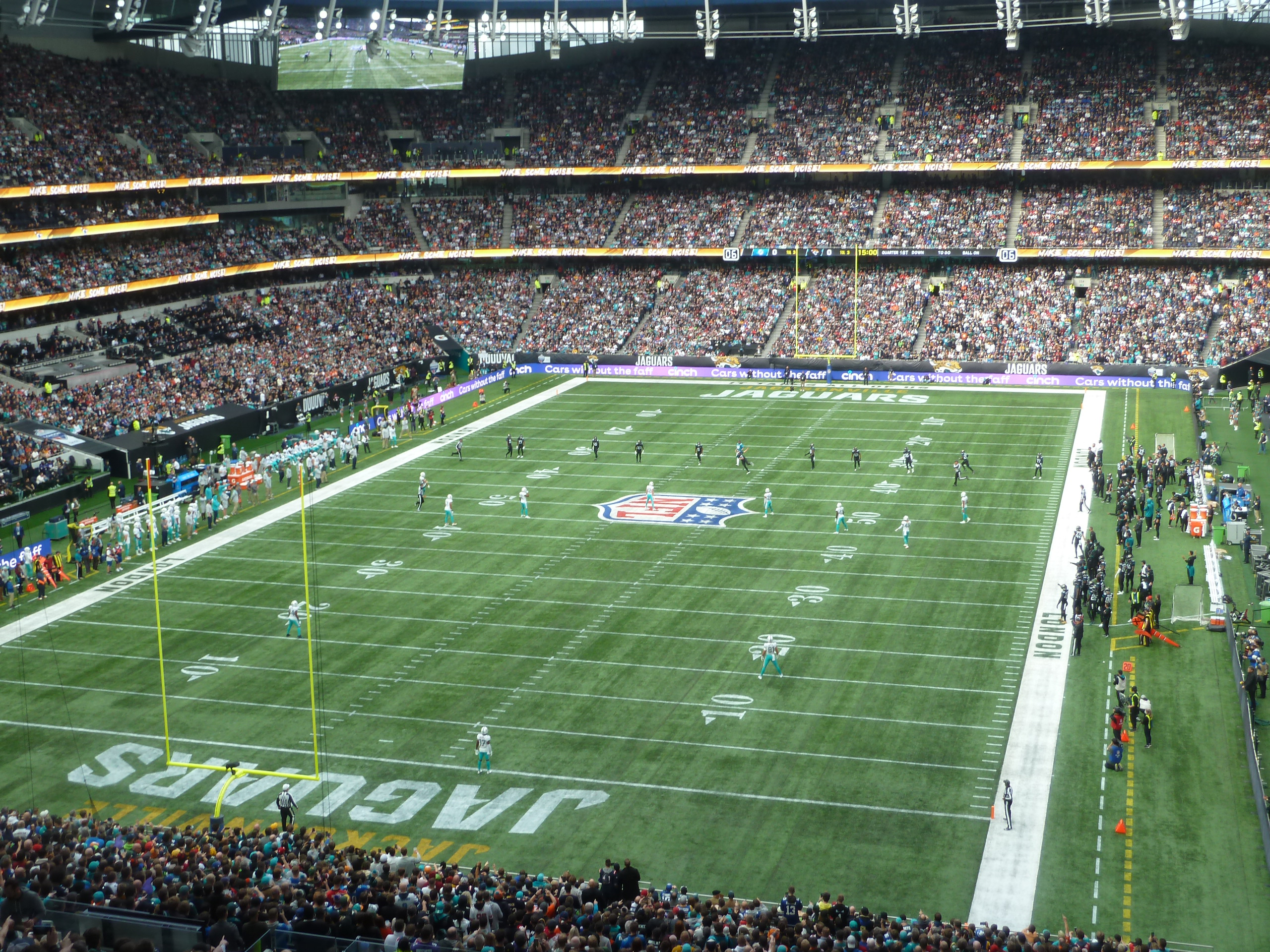
The academy plays some games at Tottenham Hotspur Stadium, which also hosts NFL London Games.

The academy's team plays against both European teams and American high schools. As of October 2024, they were unbeaten against European opponents. Ten matches were scheduled for the 2025–26 season, including four against US high schools. Since 2023, the team has played at least one game per year against a US high school at Tottenham Hotspur Stadium, in the build-up to the NFL London Games. The 2025–26 team roster included 68 players from 20 countries. Athletes are recruited through multiple pathways: some apply directly, some are scouted, and some are selected for their performance at recruitment camps. Since its establishment, the academy has grown increasingly competitive, with 3500 applicants for 30 places in 2025.

Training is intensive, with students working 12-hour days and attending nine practices per week.

In the 2025–26 season, there were 40 NFL Academy graduates in US college football, with 27 in Division I. Tight end Seydou Traore was the first NFL Academy graduate to be drafted, being selected by the Miami Dolphins as the 180th pick of the 2026 NFL draft. Buffalo Bills lineman Travis Clayton tried out for the academy in 2019, but chose not to continue with the program.

== NFL Academy Asia-Pacific ==
NFL Academy Asia-Pacific serves students from the Asia-Pacific region and is associated with A.B. Paterson College, in Gold Coast, Queensland, Australia. It opened in 2024 and caters to athletes aged 12 to 18. Jordan Petaia and Laki Tasi trained at the academy for several months prior to joining the Los Angeles Chargers and Las Vegas Raiders through the International Player Pathway in 2025.

== Notable alumni ==
Player	Position	Teams
Peter Clarke	Tight end	Temple (2023–present)
Jordan Petaia	Tight end	Los Angeles Chargers (2025)
Laki Tasi	Defensive lineman	Las Vegas Raiders (2025–present)
Seydou Traore	Tight end	Arkansas State (2021–2022), Mississippi State (2023–2025), Miami Dolphins (2026–present)
