= Peter Clarke (American football) =

English-American football tight end

No. 88 – Temple Owls
- Position: Tight end
- Class: Senior

Personal information
- Born: London, England
- Listed height: 6 ft 6 in (1.98 m)
- Listed weight: 265 lb (120 kg)

Career information
- High school: NFL Academy
- College: Temple (2023–present)

Awards and highlights
- Second-team All-American (2025)
- Stats at ESPN

Peter David Clarke is an English gridiron football tight end for the Temple Owls.

== Early life ==
Clarke grew up in London, England, where he attended the NFL Academy and earned offers from schools such as Kansas, Temple, and UTSA. Ultimately, he committed to play college football for the Temple Owls.

== College career ==
During his first two collegiate seasons in 2023 and 2024, Clarke played in 20 games, recording five receptions for 34 yards and three touchdowns. In week 1 of the 2025 season, he notched four receptions for 85 yards and two touchdowns in a victory against UMass. In week 10, Clarke brought in a career-long 50-yard reception in an overtime victory versus Tulsa. He finished the 2025 season hauling in 30 passes for 483 yards and six touchdowns.
