= Fort Meade Middle-Senior High School =

Fort Meade Middle-High School

Location
- 700 Edgewood Drive; Fort Meade, Florida; United States; 27.760734°N 81.783108°W

Information
- Type: Public
- Principal: Seth Lambert
- Staff: 45.00 (FTE)
- Grades: 6-12
- Enrollment: 771 (2023-2024)
- Student to teacher ratio: 17.13
- Campus: Suburban/Rural
- Colors: Black; Gold
- Athletics: Florida High School Athletic Association
- Nickname: Miners
- Website: https://fortmeadems.polkschoolsfl.com/

Fort Meade Middle-High School or FMMSHS is a combined middle school and high school located in Fort Meade, Florida in Polk County, Florida. The school serves the city of Fort Meade and surrounding areas. The school is located on the northeast side of the city of Fort Meade at 700 Edgewood Drive North. The school enforces a dress code for grades 6-8. The school's teams compete as the Miners.

== Notable alumni ==
- Deonte Anderson, college football defensive end for the Mississippi State Bulldogs
- Melony Bell, politician
- Canter Brown Jr. historian and author
- Sammy Green, former American football player
- Onterio McCalebb, American football running back
- Andrew McCutchen, professional baseball outfielder
- Darryl Carlton, professional football player Offensive Tackle, First Round Draft Pick Miami Dolphins 1975-1976, Tampa Bay Buccaneers 1977-1979.

== See also ==
- Polk County, Florida
- Polk County Public Schools
