= Matt Barnes (American football) =

American football player and coach (born 1986)

Current position
- Title: Co-defensive coordinator & safeties coach
- Team: Mississippi State
- Conference: SEC

Biographical details
- Born: May 27, 1986 (age 40)
- Education: Salisbury University (2008)

Playing career
- 2006–2008: Salisbury
- Position: Linebacker

Coaching career (HC unless noted)
- 2009: Delaware Valley (RB)
- 2010: West Virginia Wesleyan (RB)
- 2011: West Virginia Wesleyan (OC/QB)
- 2012–2014: Florida (GA)
- 2015: Michigan (DA)
- 2016–2018: Maryland (STC/LB)
- 2019: Ohio State (STC/Asst. DB)
- 2020: Ohio State (STC/S)
- 2021: Ohio State (DB/DC)
- 2022–2023: Memphis (DC)
- 2024–present: Mississippi State (Co-DC/S)

Matt Barnes (born May 27, 1986) is an American college football coach. He is the co-defensive coordinator and safeties coach for Mississippi State University, positions he has held since 2024. He previously served as the special teams coordinator and defensive backs coach at Ohio State and defensive coordinator for Memphis.

== Playing career ==
Barnes played linebacker for Salisbury University.

Barnes played Tailback and Safety for the Urbana Hawks during their then State record 50 game win streak. Becoming, along with Billy Gaines and Eric Lenz, one of the only Sophomores to make the start for Dave Carruthers at Urbana.

== Coaching career ==
Barnes began his coaching career in 2009 as the running backs coach for Delaware Valley University. In 2010, he coached running backs West Virginia Wesleyan College. In 2011, Barnes served as offensive coordinator and quarterbacks coach for West Virginia Wesleyan.

Barnes got his first coaching opportunity at the Division I level as a graduate assistant at the University of Florida. He held this role from 2012-2014.

In 2015, he joined the staff at the University of Michigan as a defensive analyst.

From 2016-2018, he served as linebackers coach and special teams coordinator for the University of Maryland.

=== Ohio State ===
In 2019, Barnes accepted a job on Ryan Day's staff at Ohio State as assistant secondary coach and special teams coordinator. Prior to the 2020 season, Barnes was given the title of safeties coach and special teams coordinator. Barnes was then named the secondary coach on February 3, 2021.

Following defensive struggles for the Buckeyes in the beginning of the 2021 season, defensive coordinator Kerry Coombs was stripped of defensive play calling duties, which were given to Barnes.

=== Memphis ===
On January 1, 2022, it was reported that Barnes would become the defensive coordinator at Memphis.

=== Mississippi State ===
During the 2024 offseason, Barnes was named co-defensive coordinator and safeties coach at Mississippi State under head coach Jeff Lebby.
