= Isaac Smith (American football) =

American football player (born 2004)

No. 2 – Mississippi State Bulldogs
- Position: Safety
- Class: Senior

Personal information
- Born: October 9, 2004 (age 22)
- Listed height: 6 ft 0 in (1.83 m)
- Listed weight: 220 lb (100 kg)

Career information
- High school: Itawamba Agricultural (Fulton, Mississippi)
- College: Mississippi State (2023–present)

Awards and highlights
- Second-team All-SEC (2024)
- Stats at ESPN

Isaac Dion Smith (born October 9, 2004) is an American college football safety for the Mississippi State Bulldogs.

== Early life ==
Smith attended Itawamba Agricultural High School in Fulton, Mississippi. He was rated as a four-star recruit and committed to play college football for the Mississippi State Bulldogs over offers from schools such as Florida, Florida State, Georgia, LSU, Texas A&M, and USC.

== College career ==
As a freshman in 2023, Smith appeared in all 12 games for the Bulldogs, totaling 15 tackles. In the 2024 season opener, he tallied 11 tackles and a pass deflection in a win over Eastern Kentucky. In week 4, Smith notched seven tackles and a forced fumble through just three quarters before leaving with a concussion, in a loss versus Florida. He missed the following week's matchup with #1 Texas.
