= Deonte Anderson =

American football player (born 2002)

No. 58 – Orlando Pirates
- Position: Defensive end
- Roster status: Active

Personal information
- Born: September 19, 2002 (age 24)
- Listed height: 6 ft 3 in (1.91 m)
- Listed weight: 260 lb (118 kg)

Career information
- High school: Fort Meade (Fort Meade, Florida)
- College: Mississippi State (2021–2025)
- NFL draft: 2026: undrafted

Career history
- Orlando Pirates (2026–present)
- Stats at ESPN

Deonte Kiyon Anderson (born September 19, 2002) is an American football defensive end for the Orlando Pirates of the Indoor Football League (IFL). He played college football for the Mississippi State Bulldogs.

== Early life ==
Anderson grew up in Miami, Florida and attended Fort Meade Middle-Senior High School where he lettered in football and basketball. In his high school football career, Anderson completed 18 receiving receptions for 206 yards and four touchdowns. Anderson would also complete a total of 43 total tackles, 10.0 tackles for loss, 4.0 sacks, an interceptions, a pass breakup and two fumble recoveries. Anderson was a four-star rated recruit and would decide to commit to play college football at Mississippi State University over offers from schools such as East Carolina, FIU, Georgia Tech, Illinois, Indiana, Michigan State, South Carolina, UCF, Vanderbilt and Virginia Tech.

== College career ==
Anderson did not see any game action during his true freshman season in 2021 and was ultimately redshirted.

During the 2022 season, he appeared in five games while primarily on special teams and made his first two assisted tackles of his collegiate career against East Tennessee State.

During the 2023 season, he appeared in 12 games and started two of them, finishing the season with 38 total tackles (10 solo and 28 assisted), three tackles for loss for nine yards, 0.5 sacks for four yards, four pass breakups and a forced fumble.

== Professional career ==
Pre-draft measurables
Height	Weight	Arm length	Hand span	Wingspan	40-yard dash	10-yard split	20-yard split	20-yard shuttle	Three-cone drill	Vertical jump	Broad jump	Bench press
6 ft 4 in (1.93 m)	260 lb (118 kg)	32 3/4 in (0.83 m)	8 7/8 in (0.23 m)	6 ft 7 7/8 in (2.03 m)	4.87 s	1.71 s	2.75 s	4.53 s	7.56 s	31 in (0.79 m)	9 ft 4 in (2.84 m)	14 reps
All values from Pro Day

On May 23, 2026, Anderson signed to play with the Orlando Pirates of the Indoor Football League (IFL).
