= Coleman Hutzler =

American football player and coach (born 1984)

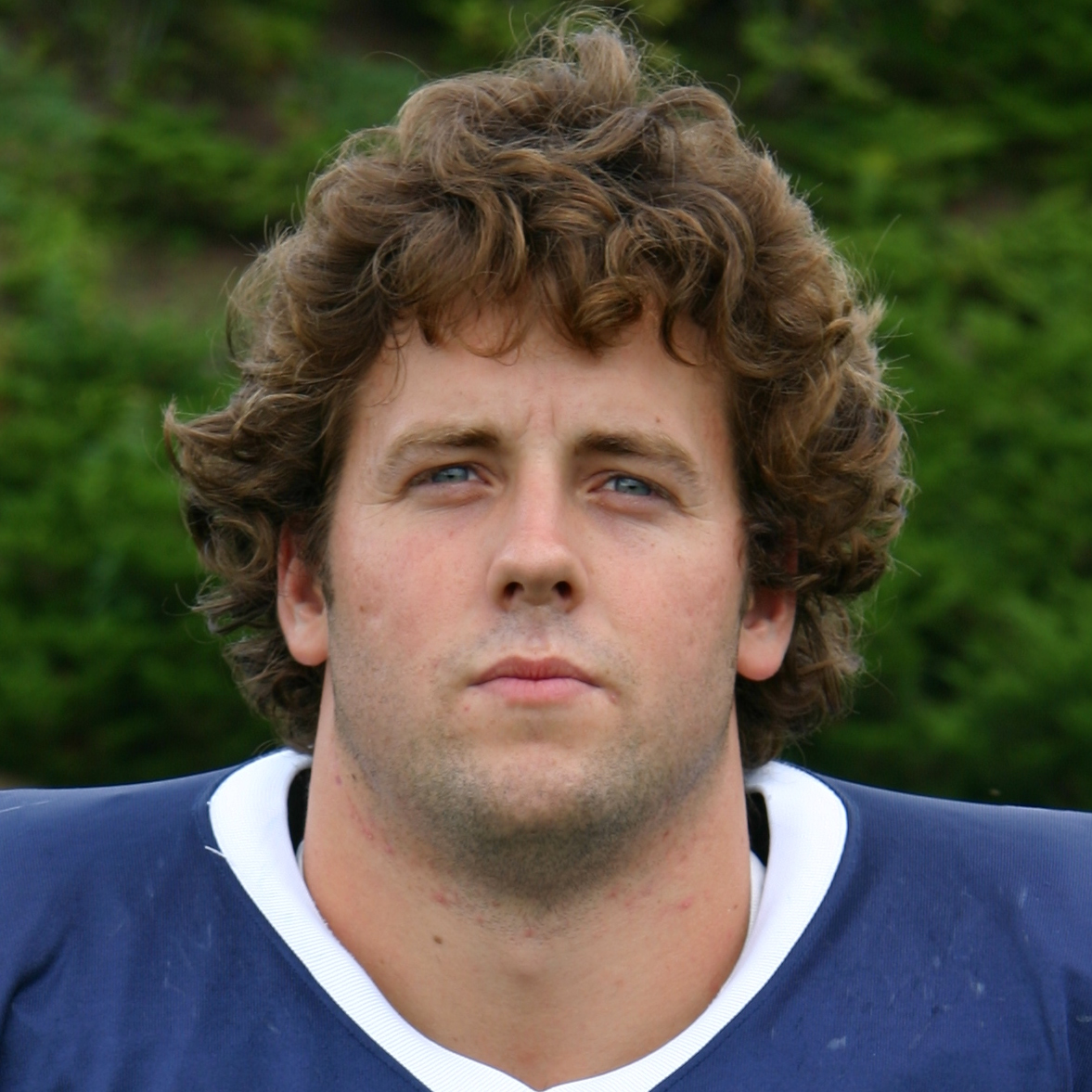
- Hutzler in 2005

Current position
- Title: Outside linebackers coach
- Team: Auburn
- Conference: SEC

Biographical details
- Born: May 5, 1984 (age 42); Las Vegas, Nevada
- Education: Middlebury College (2006)

Playing career
- 2002–2005: Middlebury
- Position: Linebacker

Coaching career (HC unless noted)
- 2006: San Diego (DA)
- 2007: Stanford (RA)
- 2008–2009: Stanford (DA)
- 2010–2011: Florida (STC/LB)
- 2012–2013: New Mexico (STC/OLB)
- 2014: Florida (STC/OLB)
- 2015: Boston College (STC/OLB)
- 2016–2019: South Carolina (STC/LB)
- 2020: Texas (co-DC/ILB)
- 2021: Ole Miss (STC)
- 2022–2023: Alabama (STC/OLB)
- 2024–2025: Mississippi State (DC/LB)
- 2026–present: Auburn (OLB)

Coleman Hutzler (born May 5, 1984) is an American college football coach. He is the outside linebackers coach for Auburn University, a position he has held since 2026.

== Coaching career ==
Hutzler got his first coaching job in 2006 with San Diego as a defensive assistant. In 2007, Hutzler joined the Stanford Cardinal as a recruiting assistant, the in 2008 he was promoted to be a defensive assistant. In 2010, Hutzler was hired by Florida as the team's special teams coordinator and linebackers coach. In 2012, Hutzler joined the New Mexico Lobos as the special teams coordinator and outside linebackers coach. In 2014, Hutzler joined Florida again under the same role. In 2015, Hutzler joined the Boston College Eagles to be the special teams coordinator and linebackers coach. In 2016, Hutzler was hired by South Carolina as the team's special teams coordinator and linebackers coach. For the 2020 season, Hutzler joined the Texas Longhorns as the team's co-defensive coordinator and linebackers coach. During the 2021 season, Hutzler was hired by the Ole Miss Rebels as the team's special teams coordinator. In 2022, Hutzler was hired by Alabama to be the special teams coordinator and outside linebackers coach. For the 2024 season, Hutzler joined the Mississippi State Bulldogs to be the team's defensive coordinator and linebackers coach.

== Personal life ==
Hutzler and his wife, Cobey, have a son, Micah, and a daughter, Leila. Cobey is the daughter of Dave Shoji, and sister of Kawika Shoji and Erik Shoji.
