= Jeff Lebby =

American football coach (born 1984)

- Lebby in 2026

Current position
- Title: Head coach
- Team: Mississippi State
- Conference: SEC
- Record: 12–24

Biographical details
- Born: January 5, 1984 (age 42); McGregor, Texas, U.S.
- Education: Oklahoma (2007)

Coaching career (HC unless noted)
- 2002–2006: Oklahoma (SA)
- 2007: Victoria Memorial HS (TX) (OL/TE)
- 2008–2011: Baylor (OQC)
- 2012–2014: Baylor (RB)
- 2015–2016: Baylor (PGC/RB/ORC)
- 2017: Southeastern (OC)
- 2018: UCF (QB)
- 2019: UCF (OC/QB)
- 2020–2021: Ole Miss (OC/QB)
- 2022–2023: Oklahoma (OC/QB)
- 2024–present: Mississippi State

Head coaching record
- Overall: 12–24
- Bowls: 0–1

Jeff Lebby (born January 5, 1984) is an American college football coach and former player. He is the head football coach for Mississippi State University, a position he has held since 2024, earning an annual salary of $4.5 million. He has previously served as the offensive coordinator and quarterbacks coach at Oklahoma, an assistant coach at the University of Mississippi (Ole Miss), Baylor University, and University of Central Florida (UCF).

== Playing career ==
Lebby played high school football at Andrews High School. He earned All-State honors his senior year and signed with Oklahoma to play football. An injury ended his playing career in college.

== Coaching career ==
=== Early career ===
After the injury ended his playing career, he switched to coaching and stayed at Oklahoma as a student assistant. At Oklahoma, he met then-Oklahoma quarterback and his future boss Josh Heupel. He left Oklahoma to coach offensive line and tight ends at Victoria High School (Texas).

=== Baylor ===
Lebby came back to the collegiate ranks in 2008, and served in various roles for Baylor across nine seasons, including passing game coordinator for two seasons. From 2008 to 2011, he was the assistant director of football operations. He also served five seasons as a running backs coach.

==== Role during 2015 Baylor football scandal ====
While coaching at Baylor, Lebby was named by Baylor student Dolores Lozano as one of the coaches who took no action against running back Devin Chafin after she reported being physically assaulted three times by him. After Art Briles was terminated by Baylor, Lebby defended Briles, who is also Lebby's father-in-law, and sold shirts with #CAB (Coach Art Briles) in a show of continued support.

=== Southeastern ===
He got his first full-time offensive coordinator opportunity at Southeastern, an NAIA school in Florida. He helped lead Southeastern to the Mid-South Conference Sun Division title and a playoff berth. Southeastern would finish with the No. 1 scoring offense and the No. 3 total offense in the NAIA that year.

=== UCF ===
On December 24, 2017, UCF announced the hire of Lebby as their quarterback coach, reuniting with Josh Heupel. Under his guidance, quarterback McKenzie Milton was seventh in yards per attempt and ninth in passing efficiency. Milton would finish sixth in Heisman Trophy voting that year. He was promoted to offensive coordinator in 2019. His offense ranked fifth in total offense and true freshman quarterback Dillon Gabriel threw for 3,653 yards and 29 touchdowns.

=== Ole Miss ===
On December 11, 2019, Lebby was hired by Lane Kiffin at Ole Miss to serve in the same role as he did at UCF. In his first season with the Rebels, Lebby's offense ranked eighth in total offense.

On January 6, 2021, Lebby signed a two-year extension with Ole Miss.

=== Oklahoma ===
On December 8, 2021, Oklahoma football finalized a deal for Lebby to be the Sooners' new offensive coordinator under newly hired head coach Brent Venables. Lebby's contract with Oklahoma was for three years and $5.7 million.

During his first season at Oklahoma, the Sooners were ranked 13th nationally in yards per game, improving to 4th in 2023.

=== Mississippi State ===
On November 26, 2023, Lebby was named the head coach at Mississippi State.

In the 2024 season, he led the Bulldogs to a 2–10 record.

In the 2025 season, the Bulldogs started 4–0 with a win against No. 12 Arizona State. However, Mississippi State went 1–7 down the stretch to finish 5–7 in the regular season. Despite a losing record, Mississippi State received and accepted a bid to the Duke's Mayo Bowl— their first bowl appearance since the 2022 season.

== Personal life ==
Lebby is married to his wife, Staley, and they have two children. Lebby is the son-in-law of American football coach Art Briles and the brother-in-law of Kendal Briles.

== Head coaching record ==
Year	Team	Overall	Conference	Standing	Bowl/playoffs
Mississippi State Bulldogs (Southeastern Conference) (2024–present)
2024	Mississippi State	2–10	0–8	16th	
2025	Mississippi State	5–8	1–7	T–13th	L Duke's Mayo
2026	Mississippi State	5–6	2–6		
Mississippi State:		12–24	3–21		
Total:		12–24			
