= 2021 LSU Tigers football team =

American college football season

2021 LSU Tigers football

Texas Bowl, L 20–42 vs. Kansas State
- Conference: Southeastern Conference
- Western Division
- Record: 6–7 (3–5 SEC)
- Head coach: Ed Orgeron (5th season; regular season); Brad Davis (interim; bowl game)
- Offensive coordinator: Jake Peetz (1st season)
- Offensive scheme: Spread
- Defensive coordinator: Daronte Jones (1st season)
- Base defense: 4–3
- Home stadium: Tiger Stadium

2021 Southeastern Conference football standings
	Conf.			Overall
Team	W		L	W		L
Eastern Division
No. 1 Georgia x#^	8	–	0	14	–	1
No. 18 Kentucky*	5	–	3	10	–	3
Tennessee	4	–	4	7	–	6
Missouri	3	–	5	6	–	7
South Carolina	3	–	5	7	–	6
Florida	2	–	6	6	–	7
Vanderbilt	0	–	8	2	–	10
Western Division
No. 2 Alabama x$^	7	–	1	13	–	2
No. 11 Ole Miss	6	–	2	10	–	3
No. 21 Arkansas	4	–	4	9	–	4
Mississippi State	4	–	4	7	–	6
Texas A&M	4	–	4	8	–	4
Auburn	3	–	5	6	–	7
LSU	3	–	5	6	–	7
Championship: Alabama 41, Georgia 24
# – College Football Playoff champion; ^ – College Football Playoff participant; $ – Conference champion; x – Division champion/co-champions; * – Kentucky vacated all wins due to NCAA violations.; Rankings from AP Poll

The 2021 LSU Tigers football team represented Louisiana State University in the 2021 NCAA Division I FBS football season. The Tigers played their home games at Tiger Stadium in Baton Rouge, Louisiana, and competed in the Western Division of the Southeastern Conference (SEC). They were led by sixth-year head coach Ed Orgeron, who left the program at the conclusion of the regular season. The Tigers ended their season by playing Kansas State in the Texas Bowl, where they were led by interim head coach Brad Davis.

The 42–20 loss in the Texas Bowl to the Wildcats saddled LSU with its first sub-.500 season since 1999, when a 3–8 record led to the dismissal of coach Gerry DiNardo.

== Schedule ==
Date	Time	Opponent	Rank	Site	TV	Result	Attendance
September 4, 2021	7:30 p.m.	at UCLA*	No. 16	Rose Bowl; Pasadena, CA	FOX	L 27–38	68,123
September 11	7:00 p.m.	McNeese State*		Tiger Stadium; Baton Rouge, LA	ESPN+, SECN+	W 34–7	94,220
September 18	6:30 p.m.	Central Michigan*		Tiger Stadium; Baton Rouge, LA	SECN	W 49–21	92,547
September 25	11:00 a.m.	at Mississippi State		Davis Wade Stadium; Starkville, MS (rivalry)	ESPN	W 28–25	50,298
October 2	8:00 p.m.	No. 22 Auburn		Tiger Stadium; Baton Rouge, LA (rivalry)	ESPN	L 19–24	97,717
October 9	6:30 p.m.	at No. 16 Kentucky		Kroger Field; Lexington, KY (SEC Nation)	SECN	L 21–42	61,690
October 16	11:00 a.m.	No. 20 Florida		Tiger Stadium; Baton Rouge, LA (rivalry)	ESPN	W 49–42	96,012
October 23	2:30 p.m.	at No. 12 Ole Miss		Vaught–Hemingway Stadium; Oxford, MS (Magnolia Bowl, SEC Nation)	CBS	L 17–31	64,523
November 6	6:00 p.m.	at No. 2 Alabama		Bryant–Denny Stadium; Tuscaloosa, AL (rivalry)	ESPN	L 14–20	100,077
November 13	6:30 p.m.	No. 25 Arkansas		Tiger Stadium; Baton Rouge, LA (rivalry)	SECN	L 13–16 ^{OT}	98,772
November 20	8:00 p.m.	Louisiana–Monroe*		Tiger Stadium; Baton Rouge, LA	ESPN2	W 27–14	92,790
November 27	6:00 p.m.	No. 15 Texas A&M		Tiger Stadium; Baton Rouge, LA (rivalry)	ESPN	W 27–24	91,595
January 4, 2022	8:00 p.m.	vs. Kansas State*		NRG Stadium; Houston, TX (Texas Bowl)	ESPN	L 20–42	52,207
*Non-conference game; Rankings from AP Poll and CFP Rankings after November 2 released prior to game; All times are in Central time

== Roster ==
2021 LSU Tigers football team roster
Players
Coaches
Offense

Pos.	#	Name	Class
WR	1	Kayshon Boutte	So
WR	2	Koy Moore	So
RB	3	Tyrion Davis-Price	Jr
RB	4	John Emery Jr.	Jr
QB	5	Garrett Nussmeier	Fr
WR	6	Deion Smith	Fr
WR	8	Malik Nabers	Fr
WR	10	Jaray Jenkins	So
WR	11	Brian Thomas Jr.	Fr
WR	12	Alex Adams	So
QB	12	Tavion Faulk	Fr
WR	13	Jontre Kirklin	Sr
QB	14	Max Johnson	So
QB	15	Myles Brennan	Sr
WR	16	Devonta Lee	Jr
WR	17	Chris Hilton Jr.	Fr
QB	19	Matt O'Dowd	Fr
RB	21	Corey Kiner	Fr
RB	22	Armoni Goodwin	Fr
RB	23	Corren Norman	So
WR	24	Carter Arceneaux	Fr
RB	26	Tre Bradford	So
RB	27	Josh Williams	So
WR	29	Ethan Laing	Fr
WR	33	Trey Palmer	Jr
RB	35	Nick Demas	Fr
TE	41	Jake Chiasson	Fr
TE	42	Aaron Moffitt	GS
TE	45	Stephen King	Jr
TE	46	Charlie Drost	Fr
OL	55	Kimo Makane'ole	Fr
C	56	Liam Shanahan	Sr
G	57	Chasen Hines	Sr
OL	58	Kardell Thomas	So
OT	61	Cameron Wire	Jr
OL	64	Joshua Billedeaux	Fr
OL	65	Charlie Pickard	Fr
OL	66	Lanson Smith	Fr
OL	67	Spencer Payne	Fr
OL	69	Charles Turner	So
G	70	Ed Ingram	Sr
OL	71	Xavier Hill	Fr
OL	72	Garrett Dellinger	Fr
OL	74	Marcus Dumervil	Fr
OL	75	Anthony Bradford	Fr
OT	76	Austin Deculus	GS
OL	77	Marlon Martinez	So
OL	78	Thomas Perry	So
WR	80	Jack Bech	Fr
TE	82	Jack Mashburn	So
TE	83	Gabe Leonards	Fr
TE	84	Cameron McCormick	Jr
WR	85	L. J. Gilyot	So
TE	86	Caleb Bonine	Fr
TE	87	Kole Taylor	So
WR	88	Evan Francioni	Jr
WR	89	Jack Rilling	Fr

Defense

Pos.	#	Name	Class
DL	0	Maason Smith	Fr
CB	1	Eli Ricks	So
CB	2	Dwight McGlothern	So
DE	3	Andre Anthony	GS
S	4	Todd Harris Jr.	GS
S	5	Jay Ward	Jr
CB	6	Derrick Davis Jr.	Fr
CB	7	Derek Stingley Jr.	Jr
DE	8	BJ Ojulari	So
LB	10	Josh White	So
DE	11	Ali Gaye	Sr
DB	14	Matthew Langlois	Fr
DB	15	Sage Ryan	Fr
DE	17	Zavier Carter	Fr
LB	18	Damone Clark	Sr
LB	19	Mike Jones Jr.	So
S	21	Jordan Toles	So
LB	22	Navontesque Strong	So
LB	23	Micah Baskerville	Sr
CB	24	Darren Evans	Sr
CB	25	Cordale Flott	Jr
DB	26	Damarius McGhee	Fr
DB	27	Ralph Walker	Fr
DB	28	Major Burns	Fr
CB	29	Raydarious Jones	So
LB	30	Greg Penn III	Fr
S	31	Cameron Lewis	GS
CB	32	Lloyd Cole	Sr
DB	33	Everett Garard	Fr
LB	34	Antoine Sampah	So
DE	35	Sai'vion Jones	Fr
S	36	Messiah Farnas	Fr
LB	37	Hunter Faust	Jr
DB	38	Pig Cage	Fr
LB	39	Phillip Webb	Fr
DL	40	Landon Jackson	Fr
LB	41	Kyler Rodriguez	Fr
LB	42	Lane Blue	Fr
DE	42	Matt Worch	Fr
LB	43	Matt Jayne	Fr
LB	46	Blake McLaughlin	Fr
LB	51	Dylan Gibbs	Fr
LB	52	Nate Gibbs	Fr
DE	53	Soni Fonua	Sr
LB	54	Aaron Benfield	So
DE	55	Jarell Cherry	Jr
DL	56	Vincent Valdez	Fr
LB	58	Jared Small	Sr
DE	59	Desmond Little	So
DE	81	Bryce Langston	Fr
DT	90	Jacobian Guillory	Fr
DT	92	Neil Farrell Jr.	GS
DT	94	Joseph Evans	So
DT	97	Glen Logan	Sr
DT	99	Jaquelin Roy	So

Special teams

Pos.	#	Name	Class
K	32	Avery Atkins	So
K	31	Peyton Badyrko	Fr
K	31	Damian Ramos	Fr
K	36	Cade York	Jr
P	38	Peyton Todd	Fr
K	39	Ezekeal Mata	Fr
K	43	Preston Stafford	Jr
LS	44	Luke Laforge	Fr
LS	47	Max Peterson	Fr
LS	48	Quentin Skinner	So
LS	49	Jonathan Ferguson	Fr

Head coach

- Ed Orgeron

Coordinators/assistant coaches

- Brad Davis – Associate head coach / offensive line
- Jake Peetz – Offensive coordinator
- Daronte Jones – Defensive coordinator
- Corey Raymond – Cornerbacks / recruiting coordinator
- Blake Baker – Linebackers
- Andre Carter – Defensive line
- D. J. Mangas – Passing game coordinator
- Kevin Faulk – Running backs
- Mickey Joseph – Wide receivers / assistant head coach
- Greg McMahon – Special teams coordinator
- Tommy Moffitt – Strength and conditioning coordinator
- Antonio Fenelus – Defensive analyst

Legend

- (C) Team captain
- (S) Suspended
- (I) Ineligible
- Injured
- Redshirt

Roster

== Rankings ==
Ranking movements Legend: ██ Increase in ranking ██ Decrease in ranking — = Not ranked RV = Received votes
	Week															
Poll	Pre	1	2	3	4	5	6	7	8	9	10	11	12	13	14	Final
AP	16	RV	RV	RV	RV	—	—	RV	—	—	—	—	—			
Coaches	13	RV	RV	RV	RV	—	—	RV	—	—	—	—	—			
CFP	Not released									—	—	—	—			Not released

== Players drafted into the NFL ==
Round	Pick	Player	Position	NFL Club
1	3	Derek Stingley	CB	Houston Texans
2	59	Ed Ingram	G	Minnesota Vikings
3	82	Cordale Flott	CB	New York Giants
3	93	Tyrion Davis-Price	RB	San Francisco 49ers
4	124	Cade York	K	Cleveland Browns
4	126	Neil Farrell	DT	Las Vegas Raiders
5	176	Damone Clark	LB	Dallas Cowboys
6	205	Austin Deculus	OT	Houston Texans
6	210	Chasen Hines	OG	New England Patriots
7	248	Andre Anthony	DE	Tampa Bay Buccaneers
