= 2022 Texas Bowl (January) =

Postseason college football bowl game

2022 TaxAct Texas Bowl
- 15th Texas Bowl
LSU Tigers	Kansas State Wildcats
(6–6)	(7–5)
SEC	Big 12
20	42
Head coach: Brad Davis (interim)	Head coach: Chris Klieman
	1	2	3	4	Total
LSU	0	7	0	13	20
Kansas State	7	14	7	14	42
- Date: January 4, 2022
- Season: 2021
- Stadium: NRG Stadium
- Location: Houston, Texas
- MVP: Skylar Thompson (QB, Kansas State)
- Favorite: Kansas State by 7.5
- Referee: John O'Neill (Big Ten)
- Attendance: 52,207

United States TV coverage
- Network: ESPN
- Announcers: Tom Hart (play–by–play), Tim Hasselbeck (analyst), and Kelsey Riggs (sideline)

International TV coverage
- Network: ESPN Brasil
- Announcers: Renan do Couto (play-by-play) and Weinny Eirado (analyst)

The 2022 Texas Bowl was a college football bowl game played on January 4, 2022, with kickoff at 9:00 p.m. EST (8:00 p.m. local CST) and televised on ESPN. It was the 15th edition of the Texas Bowl (after the 2020 edition was canceled due to the COVID-19 pandemic), and was one of the 2021–22 bowl games concluding the 2021 FBS football season. Sponsored by tax preparation software company TaxAct, the game was officially known as the TaxAct Texas Bowl. This was the first edition of the Texas Bowl to be played in the month of January.

== Teams ==
Consistent with conference tie-ins, the game was played between teams from the Big 12 Conference and the Southeastern Conference (SEC).

This was the second meeting between Kansas State and LSU; the Tigers defeated the Wildcats, 21–0, on September 13, 1980, at Tiger Stadium in Baton Rouge, the teams' only prior meeting.

=== Kansas State Wildcats ===
Kansas State finished their regular season with an overall 7–5 record, 4–5 in Big 12 games. After starting their season with three wins, the Wildcats fell to 3–3, then won four games in a row before ending the season with back-to-back losses. Kansas State faced two ranked teams in FBS during the season, losing to Oklahoma and Baylor.

=== LSU Tigers ===
LSU finished their regular season with an overall 6–6 record, 3–5 in SEC play. After starting the season ranked No. 16 LSU lost their first game to unranked UCLA. LSU won their next three games, lost five of their next six games, and finished their schedule with back-to-back wins to become bowl eligible. Four of the five losses LSU's suffered were to ranked FBS teams; they defeated two ranked teams, Florida and Texas A&M. Head coach Ed Orgeron left the program at the end of the regular season, and offensive line coach Brad Davis was named interim head coach for the Texas Bowl.

Due to one quarterback (Max Johnson) transferring, one quarterback (Myles Brennan) recovering from injury, and the decision to not start their last remaining eligible scholarship quarterback (Garrett Nussmeier) in order to preserve his redshirt status, LSU instead had wide receiver Jontre Kirklin start as their quarterback. Kirklin had not played as a quarterback since high school in 2016. With the loss to Kansas State in the bowl game, LSU suffered their first losing season since 1999.

== Game summary ==
2022 TaxAct Texas Bowl

Quarter	1	2	3	4	Total
LSU	0	7	0	13	20
Kansas State	7	14	7	14	42

at NRG Stadium • Houston, Texas

- Date: Tuesday, January 4, 2022
- Game time: 9:00 p.m. EST (8:00 p.m. CST)
- Game weather: n/a (game played indoor)
- Game attendance: 52,207
- Referee: John O'Neill
- TV announcers (ESPN): Tom Hart (play–by–play), Tim Hasselbeck (analyst), and Kelsey Riggs (sideline)
- Box score

Game information

First quarter

- 9:13 KSU – Malik Knowles 25-yard reception from Skylar Thompson, Ty Zentner kick good. Drive: 11 plays, 75 yards, 5:47. Kansas State 7–0

Second quarter

- 11:39 KSU – Deuce Vaughn 1-yard rush, Ty Zentner kick good. Drive: 18 plays, 71 yards, 9:16. Kansas State 14–0
- 7:01 KSU – Malik Knowles 5-yard reception from Skylar Thompson, Ty Zentner kick good. Drive: 6 plays, 43 yards, 3:00. Kansas State 21–0
- 0:20 LSU – Jaray Jenkins 23-yard reception from Jontre Kirklin, Preston Stafford kick good. Drive: 13 plays, 75 yards, 6:41. Kansas State 21–7

Third quarter

- 8:46 KSU – Deuce Vaughn 18-yard run, Ty Zentner kick good. Drive: 7 plays, 61 yards, 3:53. Kansas State 28–7

Fourth quarter

- 14:56 KSU – Deuce Vaughn 2-yard reception from Skylar Thompson, Ty Zentner kick good. Drive: 3 plays, 55 yards, 1:03. Kansas State 35–7
- 10:15 KSU – Deuce Vaughn 1-yard rush, Ty Zentner kick good. Drive: 6 plays, 70 yards, 3:11. Kansas State 42–7
- 3:35 LSU – Malik Nabers 15-yard reception from Jontre Kirklin, Preston Stafford kick good. Drive: 11 plays, 75 yards, 6:40. Kansas State 42–14
- 0:00 LSU – Chris Hilton Jr. 81-yard pass from Jontre Kirklin, no kick (clock expired). Drive: 3 plays, 87 yards, 0:48. Kansas State 42–20

=== Statistics ===
Statistics	LSU	KSU
First downs	15	22
Plays–yards	48–308	62–442
Rushes–yards	37–170	34–183
Passing yards	138	259
Passing: comp–att–int	7–11–2	21–28–0
Turnovers		
Time of possession	27:38	32:22

Team	Category	Player	Statistics
LSU	Passing	Jontre Kirklin	7/11, 138 yards, 3 TD, 2 INT
LSU	Rushing	Jontre Kirklin	11 carries, 61 yards
LSU	Receiving	Chris Hilton Jr.	1 reception, 81 yards, TD
Kansas State	Passing	Skylar Thompson	21/28, 259 yards, 3 TD
Kansas State	Rushing	Deuce Vaughn	21 carries, 146 yards, 3 TD
Kansas State	Receiving	Phillip Brooks	5 receptions, 69 yards

When the game began, Kansas State scored early and held the lead the entire game. LSU was hampered, having lost its starting quarterback who transferred to Texas A&M and backup quarterback recovering from surgery. LSU had senior receiver Jontre Kirklin move to quarterback instead of starting eligible quarterback Garrett Nussmeier. Kirklin had not played as a quarterback since high school in 2016 but was still picked as the starter over Nussmeier in order to preserve his redshirt status. LSU did not get a first down until late in the second quarter and by that time Kansas State already had a 21–0 lead. The final score was Kansas State 42, LSU 20.
