= Brad Davis (American football coach) =

American football player and coach (born 1980)

Biographical details
- Born: February 17, 1980 (age 46); Baton Rouge, Louisiana, U.S.

Playing career
- 1999–2002: Oklahoma
- Position: Guard

Coaching career (HC unless noted)
- 2003–2004: Southern Lab HS (LA) (OC/OL)
- 2005: Wayne State (MI) (GA)
- 2005: Doane (OL/RGC)
- 2006–2007: Texas A&M (GA)
- 2008: North Carolina (GA)
- 2009–2011: Portland State (OL)
- 2012–2013: Portland State (OL/RGC)
- 2014: James Madison (co-OC/OL)
- 2015: East Carolina (OL/RGC)
- 2016: North Texas (OL/RGC)
- 2017: Florida (OL)
- 2018–2019: Missouri (OL)
- 2020: Arkansas (OL)
- 2021: LSU (interim HC/OL)
- 2022–2025: LSU (OL)

Head coaching record
- Overall: 0–1
- Bowls: 0–1

Accomplishments and honors

Championships
- As a player: National Championship (2000)

Brad Davis (born February 17, 1980) is an American football offensive line coach.

== Playing career ==
Davis played his high school football at Belaire High School and later went on to the Oklahoma. Playing from 1999 until 2002 he was a part of multiple Big 12 championship teams and the 2000 national championship team as a part of the offensive line.

== Coaching career ==
=== Early coaching career ===
After he graduated from Oklahoma, Davis began coaching at the high school level working as the offensive line and was co-offensive coordinator at Southern Lab in Baton Rouge. He then spent the beginning of 2005 at Wayne State as a graduate assistant before going to work at Doane College as the offensive line coach and run game coordinator. He then went back to being a graduate assistant this time at Texas A&M for the 2006 and 2007 seasons before going to North Carolina to be a graduate assistant in 2008.

=== Portland State ===
He then went to Portland State where he spent five years as the offensive line coach and two as the run game coordinator. During his tenure there the Vikings set numerous school records including total yards (6,486) and yards rushing (3,330), rushing yards per game (277.7), rushing touchdowns (36) and total yards per game (540.5).

=== James Madison ===
In 2014 Davis went to JMU to work as the co-offensive coordinator and offensive line coach.

=== East Carolina ===
In 2015, Davis served as the run game coordinator and offensive line coach at East Carolina University.

=== North Texas ===
In 2016, Davis worked as the run game coordinator and offensive line coach for North Texas.

=== Florida ===
In 2017 Davis ventured into the SEC and worked as the offensive line coach for the Florida Gators.

=== Missouri ===
In 2018 and 2019, Davis worked as the offensive line coach for Missouri under Barry Odom.

=== Arkansas ===
In 2020 Davis was a part of Sam Pittman’s inaugural staff as the offensive line coach for Arkansas.

=== LSU ===
In 2021, the Louisiana native was named the offensive line coach for LSU. Following the final regular season game, Ed Orgeron named Davis the interim head coach. Davis coached LSU in the Texas Bowl. He was retained by Brian Kelly for the 2022 season.

== Personal life ==
Davis and his wife, Anecia, have two sons, Bradley and Brayden.

== Head coaching record ==
=== College ===
Year	Team	Overall	Conference	Standing	Bowl/playoffs
LSU Tigers (Southeastern Conference) (2021)
2021	LSU	0–1*	0–0	T–6th (Western)*	L Texas
LSU:		0–1	0–1	*Coached bowl game after Ed Orgeron stepped down	
Total:		0–1			
