= 2021 Texas A&M Aggies football team =

American college football season

2021 Texas A&M Aggies football
- Conference: Southeastern Conference
- Western Division

Ranking
- Coaches: No. 25
- Record: 8–4 (4–4 SEC)
- Head coach: Jimbo Fisher (4th season)
- Offensive coordinator: Darrell Dickey (4th season)
- Offensive scheme: Pro-style
- Defensive coordinator: Mike Elko (4th season)
- Base defense: 4–2–5
- Home stadium: Kyle Field

2021 Southeastern Conference football standings
	Conf.			Overall
Team	W		L	W		L
Eastern Division
No. 1 Georgia x#^	8	–	0	14	–	1
No. 18 Kentucky*	5	–	3	10	–	3
Tennessee	4	–	4	7	–	6
Missouri	3	–	5	6	–	7
South Carolina	3	–	5	7	–	6
Florida	2	–	6	6	–	7
Vanderbilt	0	–	8	2	–	10
Western Division
No. 2 Alabama x$^	7	–	1	13	–	2
No. 11 Ole Miss	6	–	2	10	–	3
No. 21 Arkansas	4	–	4	9	–	4
Mississippi State	4	–	4	7	–	6
Texas A&M	4	–	4	8	–	4
Auburn	3	–	5	6	–	7
LSU	3	–	5	6	–	7
Championship: Alabama 41, Georgia 24
# – College Football Playoff champion; ^ – College Football Playoff participant; $ – Conference champion; x – Division champion/co-champions; * – Kentucky vacated all wins due to NCAA violations.; Rankings from AP Poll

The 2021 Texas A&M Aggies football team represented Texas A&M University in the 2021 NCAA Division I FBS football season. The Aggies played their home games at Kyle Field in College Station, Texas, and competed in the Western Division of the Southeastern Conference (SEC). They were led by fourth-year head coach Jimbo Fisher.

After finishing the regular season with an 8–4 record, the team accepted a bid to the Gator Bowl. On December 22, the Aggies withdrew from the bowl, after a COVID-19 outbreak left the team without enough players.

== Offseason ==
=== 2021 NFL draft ===
The following Aggies were selected in the 2021 NFL Draft.

Round	Pick	Player	Position	NFL Club
3	66	Kellen Mond	QB	Minnesota Vikings
4	117	Bobby Brown III	DT	Los Angeles Rams
4	128	Dan Moore	OT	Pittsburgh Steelers
4	140	Buddy Johnson	ILB	Pittsburgh Steelers

== Schedule ==
Texas A&M announced its 2021 football schedule on January 27, 2021. The 2021 schedule will consist of 7 home, 3 away, and 2 neutral games in the regular season.

Date	Time	Opponent	Rank	Site	TV	Result	Attendance
September 4	7:00 p.m.	Kent State*	No. 6	Kyle Field; College Station, TX	ESPNU	W 41–10	97,339
September 11	2:30 p.m.	vs. Colorado*	No. 5	Empower Field at Mile High; Denver, CO	Fox	W 10–7	61,203
September 18	11:00 a.m.	New Mexico*	No. 7	Kyle Field; College Station, TX	SECN	W 34–0	84,748
September 25	2:30 p.m.	vs. No. 16 Arkansas	No. 7	AT&T Stadium; Arlington, TX (Southwest Classic)	CBS	L 10–20	57,992
October 2	6:00 p.m.	Mississippi State	No. 15	Kyle Field; College Station, TX	SECN	L 22–26	87,973
October 9	7:00 p.m.	No. 1 Alabama		Kyle Field; College Station, TX	CBS	W 41–38	106,815
October 16	11:00 a.m.	at Missouri	No. 21	Faurot Field; Columbia, MO	SECN	W 35–14	48,139
October 23	6:30 p.m.	South Carolina	No. 17	Kyle Field; College Station, TX	SECN	W 44–14	103,889
November 6	2:30 p.m.	No. 13 Auburn	No. 14	Kyle Field; College Station, TX (SEC Nation)	CBS	W 20–3	109,835
November 13	6:00 p.m.	at No. 15 Ole Miss	No. 11	Vaught–Hemingway Stadium; Oxford, MS (College GameDay)	ESPN	L 19–29	64,425
November 20	11:00 a.m.	Prairie View A&M*	No. 16	Kyle Field; College Station, TX	ESPN+/SECN+	W 52–3	98,251
November 27	6:00 p.m.	at LSU	No. 15	Tiger Stadium; Baton Rouge, LA (rivalry)	ESPN	L 24–27	91,595
*Non-conference game; Rankings from AP Poll (and CFP Rankings, after November 2) - Released prior to game; All times are in Central time

== Coaching staff ==
Name	Position	Season at Texas A&M
Jimbo Fisher	Head coach	4th
Darrell Dickey	Offensive coordinator and Quarterbacks coach	4th
Tommie Robinson	Running backs coach	2nd
James Coley	Tight ends coach	2nd
Dameyune Craig	Wide receivers coach	4th
Josh Henson	Offensive line coach	3rd
Mike Elko	Defensive coordinator and safeties coach	4th
T. J. Rushing	Defensive backs coach	2nd
Terry Price	Defensive ends coach	10th
Elijah Robinson	Defensive line coach	4th
Tyler Santucci	Linebackers coach	2nd
Luke Huard	Offensive analyst	3rd
Jerry Schmidt	Strength and Conditioning Coach	4th

== Roster ==
2021 Texas A&M Aggies Football Roster
Quarterbacks: 10 Zach Calzada – (redshirt) sophomore (6'4, 210); 13 Haynes King – (redshirt) freshman (6'3, 200); 18 Zach Daniel – (redshirt) sophomore (6'0, 185); 22 Cooper McCollum – (redshirt) freshman (6'2, 200); 23 Blake Bost – freshman (6'2, 195); 27 Jackson Oksnee – freshman (6'0, 185); 31 Reinard Britz – junior (6'3, 190); Running backs: 4 Amari Daniels – freshman (5'8, 200); 6 De’Von Achane – sophomore (5'9, 185); 20 Connor Cook – (redshirt) sophomore (6'0, 200); 21 Darvon Hubbard – (redshirt) freshman (6'0, 210); 24 Earnest Crownover – (redshirt) sophomore (6'3, 220); 25 Deondre Jackson – (redshirt) freshman (5'1, 215); 28 Isaiah Spiller – junior (6'1, 215); 34 L.J. Johnson Jr. – freshman (5'10, 205); 35 Bladen Reaves – (redshirt) sophomore (5'11, 200); Wide receivers: 0 Ainias Smith – junior (5'10, 190); 1 Demond Demas – (redshirt) freshman (6'3, 180); 2 Chase Lane – (redshirt) sophomore (6'0, 190); 3 Devin Price – sophomore (6'3, 210); 5 Jalen Preston – (redshirt) junior (6'2, 210); 7 Moose Muhammad III – (redshirt) freshman (6'1, 195); 8 Yulkeith Brown – freshman (5'10, 175); 9 Hezekiah Jones – senior (6'0, 180); 16 Kenyon Jackson – (redshirt) sophomore (6'6, 195); 29 Daniel Bushland – senior (6'0, 195); 30 Reese Mason – (redshirt) junior (6'1, 210); 81 Caleb Chapman – (redshirt) junior (6'5, 200); 83 Ryan Campbell – sophomore (6'2, 185); Tight ends: 11 Blake Smith – (redshirt) freshman (6'4, 250); 17 Eli Stowers – freshman (6'4, 215); 42 Max Wright – junior (6'4, 260); 80 Tyler Ondrusek – junior (6'7, 210); 82 Fernando Garza – freshman (6'5, 245); 85 Jalen Wydermyer – junior (6'5, 255); 87 Dametrious Crownover – freshman (6'6, 295); 88 Baylor Cupp – (redshirt) sophomore (6'7, 245); 89 Justin Mellenbruch – senior (6'1, 225); Long snappers: 12 Connor Choate – junior (6'1, 200); 48 Jacob Graham – (redshirt) freshman (5'11, 220); 50 Garret Townsend – (redshirt) sophomore (5'11, 220); 54 Connor Able – freshman (6'3, 215)	Offensive linemen: 52 Smart Chibuzo – (redshirt) freshman (6'4, 320); 53 Blake Trainor – (redshirt) sophomore (6'7, 330); 55 Kenyon Green – junior (6'4, 325); 56 John Sabra – sophomore (6'2, 330); 57 Luke Williams – freshman (6'6, 295); 58 Jahmir Johnson – (redshirt) senior (6'5, 300); 60 Trey Zuhn III – freshman (6'6, 315); 61 Bryce Foster – freshman (6'5, 325); 63 Braedon Kobza – (redshirt) sophomore (6'0, 280); 64 Layden Robinson – (redshirt) sophomore (6'4, 320); 65 Derick Hunter Jr. – (redshirt) sophomore (6'4, 305); 66 Jordan Spasojevic-Moko – sophomore (6'5, 340); 67 Galen Gallagher – (redshirt) senior (6'4, 300); 68 Remington Strickland – freshman (6'4, 295); 70 Josh Bankhead – (redshirt) freshman (6'5, 325); 72 Owen Jebson – freshman (6'5, 290); 74 Aki Ogunbiyi – (redshirt) freshman (6'4, 315); 75 Luke Matthews – (redshirt) junior (6'4, 310); 76 Reuben Fatheree II – freshman (6'8, 320); 77 Matthew Wykoff – freshman (6'6, 330); Defensive linemen: 2 Michael Clemons – (redshirt) senior (6'5, 270); 3 Tyree Johnson – (redshirt) senior (6'4, 240); 5 Shemar Turner – freshman (6'4, 285); 6 Adarious Jones – (redshirt) sophomore (6'4, 300); 8 DeMarvin Leal – junior (6'4, 290); 10 Fadil Diggs – (redshirt) freshman (6'5, 260); 15 Albert Regis – freshman (6'1, 305); 18 Donell Harris Jr. – (redshirt) freshman (6'3, 220); 30 Tunmise Adeleye – freshman (6'4, 295); 34 Isaiah Raikes – sophomore (6'1, 320); 35 McKinnley Jackson – sophomore (6'2, 325); 37 Jahzion Harris – freshman (6'4, 220); 41 R.J. Orebo – (redshirt) sophomore (6'7, 275); 46 Braedon Mowry – (redshirt) freshman (6'4, 240); 90 Elijah Jeudy – freshman (6'3, 295); 91 Marcus Burris Jr. – freshman (6'4, 285); 92 Jayden Peevy – senior (6'6, 315); 93 Dallas Walker IV – (redshirt) freshman (6'3, 325); 94 Jordan Jefferson – (redshirt) freshman (6'0, 300); 96 Grant Perry – (redshirt) freshman (6'3, 240); 97 Travis Pepin – junior (6'1, 255); 98 Jordan Johnson – sophomore (6'1, 300); Placekickers: 19 Randy Bond – freshman (5'10, 190); 36 Caden Davis – (redshirt) sophomore (6'3, 200); 47 Seth Small – senior (5'11, 205); 94 Drake Bhatia – (redshirt) freshman (5'7, 150)	Linebackers: 1 Aaron Hansford – senior (6'3, 240); 22 Antonio Doyle Jr. – sophomore (6'3, 235); 23 Tarian Lee Jr. – (redshirt) sophomore (6'2, 230); 24 Charles Russel Jr. – junior (6'2, 235); 32 Andrew White Jr. – junior (6'3, 230); 45 Edgerrin Cooper – (redshirt) freshman (6'3, 220); 51 Kason Tullos – freshman (6'2, 215); 52 Andrew Merrick – (redshirt) freshman (6'2, 230); 53 Houston Hummel – (redshirt) freshman (6'4, 225); Cornerbacks: 0 Myles Jones – (redshirt) senior (6'4, 190); 7 Tyreek Chappell – freshman (5'11, 185); 16 Brian George – senior (6'2, 190); 17 Jaylon Jones – sophomore (6'2, 205); 31 Dreyden Norwood – freshman (6'0, 180); Defensive backs: 4 Erick Young – junior (6'1, 205); 11 Deuce Harmon – freshman (5'10, 200); 21 Josh Moten – (redshirt) freshman (6'0, 165); 27 Antonio Johnson – sophomore (6'3, 200); 28 Caleb Surber – freshman (6'0, 165); 38 Tyler Bulthuis – junior (5'8, 180); 39 Cade Garcia – junior (5'8, 185); 40 Avery Hughes – (redshirt) freshman (6'0, 180); 42 Samuel Mathews – junior (6'3, 210); 43 Alex Zettler – (redshirt) junior (6'0, 205); 81 Kyle Fitzgerald – junior (6'4, 200); 83 Will Smoot – sophomore (5'10, 180); 84 Caleb Merrell – sophomore (6'1, 195); Safeties: 9 Leon O'Neal Jr. – senior (6'1, 210); 13 Brian Williams – (6'11, 215); 14 Keldrick Carper – senior (6'2, 200); 20 Jardin Gilbert – freshman (6'1, 185); 26 Demani Richardson – junior (6'1, 210); Punters: 38 Alan Guerrieri – (redshirt) sophomore (6'0, 205); 95 Nik Constantinou – (redshirt) sophomore (6'3, 230)

== Game summaries ==
=== Kent State ===
Kent State Golden Flashes at No. 6 Texas A&M Aggies – Game summary

Quarter	1	2	3	4	Total
Golden Flashes	3	0	0	7	10
No. 6 Aggies	10	0	17	14	41

at Kyle Field, College Station, Texas

- Date: September 4
- Game time: 7:00 p.m.
- Game weather: Temperature: 95 °F (35 °C) • Weather: Sunny • Wind: S 3 MPH
- Game attendance: 97,339
- Referee: Marc Curles
- TV announcers (ESPNU): Dave Neal (play-by-play), Tom Ramsey (analyst) and Andraya Carter (sideline)
- Box score, Recap

Game information
First quarter
- TAMU – Ainias Smith 4-yard pass from Haynes King (Seth Small kick), 9:27. Aggies 7–0. Drive: 10 plays, 75 yards, 5:33.
- KENT – Andrew Glass 30-yard field goal, 5:23. Aggies 7–3. Drive: 10 plays, 68 yards, 4:04.
- TAMU – Seth Small 49-yard field goal, 4:11. Aggies 10–3. Drive: 5 plays, 15 yards, 1:12.

Second quarter

- No scoring plays

Third quarter

- TAMU – Seth Small 36-yard field goal, 10:02. Aggies 13–3. Drive: 9 plays, 47 yards, 4:02.
- TAMU – Leon O'Neal Jr. 85-yard interception return (Seth Small kick), 7:27. Aggies 20–3.
- TAMU – De’Von Achane 63-yard run (Seth Small kick), 3:49. Aggies 27–3. Drive: 5 plays, 82 yards, 2:25.

Fourth quarter

- TAMU – Ainias Smith 14-yard pass from Haynes King (Seth Small kick), 11:31. Aggies 34–3. Drive: 7 plays, 53 yards, 3:12.
- KENT – Collin Schlee 1-yard run (Andrew Glass kick), 8:27. Aggies 34–10. Drive: 10 plays, 75 yards, 3:04.
- TAMU – De’Von Achane 1-yard run (Seth Small kick), 6:26. Aggies 41–10. Drive: 4 plays, 44 yards, 2:01.

Statistics

Statistics	KENT	TAMU
First downs	19	29
Total yards	336	595
Rushing yards	226	303
Passing yards	110	292
Turnovers	2	5
Time of possession	24:50	35:10

Team	Category	Player	Statistics
Kent State	Passing	Dustin Crum	12/26, 89 yards, 2 INT
Kent State	Rushing	Xavier Williams	8 rushes, 73 yards
Kent State	Receiving	Keshunn Abram	3 receptions, 24 yards
Texas A&M	Passing	Haynes King	21/33, 292 yards, 2 TD, 3 INT
Texas A&M	Rushing	De’Von Achane	12 rushes, 124 yards, 2 TD
Texas A&M	Receiving	Ainias Smith	8 receptions, 100 yards, 2 TD

=== Colorado ===
No. 5 Texas A&M Aggies vs. Colorado Buffaloes – Game summary

Quarter	1	2	3	4	Total
No. 5 Aggies	0	3	0	7	10
Buffaloes	7	0	0	0	7

at Empower Field at Mile High, Denver, Colorado

- Date: September 11
- Game time: 2:30 p.m.
- Game weather: Temperature: 92 °F (33 °C) • Weather: Sunny • Wind: NE 9 MPH
- Game attendance: 61,203
- Referee: Matt Loeffler
- TV announcers (Fox): Joe Davis (play-by-play) and Brock Huard (analyst)
- Box score, Recap

Game information
First quarter
- COLO – Jarek Broussard 2-yard run (Cole Becker kick), 2:24. Buffaloes 7–0. Drive: 9 plays, 69 yards, 4:43.

Second quarter

- TAMU – Seth Small 41-yard field goal, 0:25. Buffaloes 7–3. Drive: 9 plays, 57 yards, 1:25.

Third quarter

- No scoring plays

Fourth quarter

- TAMU – Isaiah Spiller 18-yard pass from Zach Calzada (Seth Small kick), 2:41. Aggies 10–7. Drive: 11 plays, 77 yards, 5:09.

Statistics

Statistics	TAMU	COLO
First downs	14	14
Total yards	288	260
Rushing yards	97	171
Passing yards	191	89
Turnovers	1	1
Time of possession	31:20	28:34

Team	Category	Player	Statistics
Texas A&M	Passing	Zach Calzada	18/38, 183 yards, TD
Texas A&M	Rushing	De’Von Achane	9 rushes, 50 yards
Texas A&M	Receiving	Jalen Wydermyer	4 receptions, 66 yards
Colorado	Passing	Brendon Lewis	13/25, 89 yards, INT
Colorado	Rushing	Brendon Lewis	9 rushes, 76 yards
Colorado	Receiving	Daniel Arias	3 receptions, 37 yards

Starting quarterback Haynes King suffered a leg injury in the 1st quarter and was replaced by Zach Calzada. On the Monday following the game, head coach Jimbo Fisher said King had a leg fracture and would be out indefinitely.

=== New Mexico ===
New Mexico Lobos at No. 7 Texas A&M Aggies – Game summary

Quarter	1	2	3	4	Total
Lobos	0	0	0	0	0
No. 7 Aggies	14	10	10	0	34

at Kyle Field, College Station, Texas

- Date: September 28
- Game time: 11:00 a.m.
- Game weather: Temperature: 85 °F (29 °C) • Weather: Sunny
- Game attendance: 84,748
- Referee: Wayne Winkler
- TV announcers (SECN): Taylor Zarzour (play-by-play), Matt Stinchcomb (analyst) and Alyssa Lang (sideline)
- Box score, Recap

Game information
First quarter
- TAMU – De’Von Achane 26-yard pass from Zach Calzada (Seth Small kick), 11:44. Aggies 7–0. Drive: 3 plays, 43 yards, 1:10.
- TAMU – Demond Demas 70-yard pass from Zach Calzada (Seth Small kick), 9:28. Aggies 14–0. Drive: 1 play, 70 yards, 0:10.

Second quarter

- TAMU – Isaiah Spiller 5-yard run (Seth Small kick), 6:14. Aggies 21–0. Drive: 12 plays, 60 yards, 5:51.
- TAMU – Seth Small 35-yard field goal, 1:05. Aggies 24–0. Drive: 7 plays, 44 yards, 3:04.

Third quarter

- TAMU – Seth Small 44-yard field goal, 13:07. Aggies 27–0. Drive: 5 plays, 36 yards, 1:45.
- TAMU – Moose Muhammad III 7-yard pass from Zach Calzada (Seth Small kick), 2:20. Aggies 34–0. Drive: 8 plays, 90 yards, 4:12.

Fourth quarter

- No scoring plays

Statistics

Statistics	UNM	TAMU
First downs	9	22
Total yards	122	429
Rushing yards	89	154
Passing yards	33	275
Turnovers	1	1
Time of possession	29:01	30:59

Team	Category	Player	Statistics
New Mexico	Passing	Terry Wilson	10/23, 33 yards, INT
New Mexico	Rushing	Aaron Dumas	10 rushes, 49 yards
New Mexico	Receiving	Mannie Logan-Greene	3 receptions, 16 yards
Texas A&M	Passing	Zach Calzada	19/33, 275 yards, 3 TD, INT
Texas A&M	Rushing	Isaiah Spiller	15 rushes, 117 yards, TD
Texas A&M	Receiving	Demond Dumas	2 receptions, 100 yards, TD

=== No. 16 Arkansas ===
No. 7 Texas A&M Aggies vs. No. 16 Arkansas Razorbacks – Game summary

Quarter	1	2	3	4	Total
No. 7 Aggies	0	3	7	0	10
No. 16 Razorbacks	10	7	0	3	20

at AT&T Stadium, Arlington, Texas

- Date: September 25
- Game time: 2:30 p.m.
- Game weather: None (retractable roof closed)
- Game attendance: 57,992
- Referee: Steve Marlowe
- TV announcers (CBS): Brad Nessler (play-by-play), Gary Danielson (analyst) and Jamie Erdahl (sideline)
- Box score, Recap

Game information
First quarter
- ARK – Cam Little 46-yard field goal, 8:20. Razorbacks 3–0. Drive: 8 plays, 57 yards, 3:17.
- ARK – Treylon Burks 85-yard pass from KJ Jefferson (Cam Little kick), 2:27. Razorbacks 10–0. Drive: 1 play, 80 yards, 0:11.

Second quarter

- ARK – AJ Green 48-yard pass from KJ Jefferson (Cam Little kick), 13:55. Razorbacks 17–0. Drive: 4 plays, 82 yards, 1:22.
- TAMU – Seth Small 49-yard field goal, 0:21. Razorbacks 17–3. Drive: 9 plays, 46 yards, 2:08.

Third quarter

- TAMU – Isaiah Spiller 67-yard run (Seth Small kick), 7:51. Razorbacks 17–10. Drive: 3 plays, 75 yards, 1:16.

Fourth quarter

- ARK – Cam Little 24-yard field goal, 8:39. Razorbacks 20–10. Drive: 9 plays, 42 yards, 3:21.

Statistics

Statistics	TAMU	ARK
First downs	15	20
Total yards	272	443
Rushing yards	121	197
Passing yards	151	246
Turnovers	1	0
Time of possession	29:10	30:50

Team	Category	Player	Statistics
Texas A&M	Passing	Zach Calzada	20/36, 151 yards, INT
Texas A&M	Rushing	Isaiah Spiller	12 rushes, 95 yards, TD
Texas A&M	Receiving	Ainias Smith	2 receptions, 35 yards
Arkansas	Passing	KJ Jefferson	7/15, 212 yards, 2 TD
Arkansas	Rushing	Trelon Smith	17 rushes, 82 yards
Arkansas	Receiving	Treylon Burks	6 receptions, 167 yards, TD

=== Mississippi State ===
Mississippi State Bulldogs at No. 15 Texas A&M Aggies – Game summary

Quarter	1	2	3	4	Total
Bulldogs	10	7	7	2	26
No. 15 Aggies	7	6	6	3	22

at Kyle Field, College Station, Texas

- Date: October 2
- Game time: 6:00 p.m.
- Game weather: Sunny
- Game attendance: 87,973
- Referee: Lee Hedrick
- TV announcers (SECN): Tom Hart (play-by-play), Jordan Rodgers (analyst) and Cole Cubelic (sideline)
- Box score, Recap

Game information
First quarter
- MSST – Nolan McCord 24-yard field goal, 11:49. Bulldogs 3–0. Drive: 6 plays, 19 yards, 2:28.
- TAMU – Jalen Wydermyer 11-yard pass from Zach Calzada (Seth Small kick), 9:26. Aggies 7–3. Drive: 5 plays, 65 yards, 2:23.
- MSST – Jaden Walley 1-yard pass from Will Rogers (Nolan McCord kick), 2:58. Bulldogs 10–7. Drive: 12 plays, 75 yards, 6:28.

Second quarter

- TAMU – Seth Small 40-yard field goal, 14:16. Tied 10–10. Drive: 8 plays, 44 yards, 3:42.
- TAMU – Seth Small 37-yard field goal, 2:47. Aggies 13–10. Drive: 10 plays, 56 yards, 5:38.
- MSST – Makai Polk 15-yard pass from Will Rogers (Nolan McCord kick), 1:16. Bulldogs 17–13. Drive: 5 plays, 75 yards, 1:31.

Third quarter

- MSST – Makai Polk 20-yard pass from Will Rogers (Nolan McCord kick), 6:54. Bulldogs 24–13. Drive: 10 plays, 77 yards, 4:18.
- TAMU – Zach Calzada 25-yard run (pass failed), 1:18. Bulldogs 24–19. Drive: 10 plays, 75 yards, 5:36.

Fourth quarter

- TAMU – Seth Small 44-yard field goal, 5:39. Bulldogs 24–22. Drive: 7 plays, 42 yards, 2:32.
- MSST – Zach Calzada sacked in end zone, 2:02. Bulldogs 26–22.

Statistics

Statistics	MSST	TAMU
First downs	27	15
Total yards	438	297
Rushing yards	30	162
Passing yards	408	135
Turnovers	0	1
Time of possession	35:06	24:54

Team	Category	Player	Statistics
Mississippi State	Passing	Will Rogers	46/59, 408 yards, 3 TD
Mississippi State	Rushing	Dillon Johnson	6 rushes, 19 yards
Mississippi State	Receiving	Makai Polk	13 receptions, 126 yards, 2 TD
Texas A&M	Passing	Zach Calzada	12/20, 135 yards, TD, INT
Texas A&M	Rushing	Isaiah Spiller	16 rushes, 100 yards
Texas A&M	Receiving	Jalen Preston	2 receptions, 49 yards

=== No. 1 Alabama ===
No. 1 Alabama Crimson Tide at Texas A&M Aggies – Game summary

Quarter	1	2	3	4	Total
No. 1 Crimson Tide	7	3	14	14	38
Aggies	17	7	7	10	41

at Kyle Field, College Station, Texas

- Date: October 9
- Game time: 7:00 p.m.
- Game weather: Sunny
- Game attendance: 106,815
- Referee: Jason Autrey
- TV announcers (CBS): Brad Nessler (play-by-play), Gary Danielson (analyst) and Jamie Erdahl (sideline)
- Box score, Recap

Game information
First quarter
- TAMU – Seth Small 38-yard field goal, 11:35. Aggies 3–0. Drive: 7 plays, 54 yards, 3:25.
- ALA – Roydell Williams 20-yard pass from Bryce Young (Will Reichard kick), 6:42. Crimson Tide 7–3. Drive: 10 plays, 65 yards, 4:53.
- TAMU – Jalen Wydermyer 27-yard pass from Zach Calzada (Seth Small kick), 5:26. Aggies 10–7. Drive: 3 plays, 75 yards, 1:16.
- TAMU – Ainias Smith 6-yard pass from Zach Calzada (Seth Small kick), 0:33. Aggies 17–7. Drive: 7 plays, 41 yards, 3:44.

Second quarter

- ALA – Will Reichard 38-yard field goal, 5:44. Aggies 17–10. Drive: 5 plays, 20 yards, 1:25.
- TAMU – Isaiah Spiller 15-yard run (Seth Small kick), 2:09. Aggies 24–10. Drive: 7 plays, 75 yards, 3:35.

Third quarter

- ALA – King Mwikuta 0-yard blocked punt return (Will Reichard kick), 8:18. Aggies 24–17.
- TAMU – De’Von Achane 96-yard kickoff return (Seth Small kick), 8:00. Aggies 31–17.
- ALA – Jameson Williams 29-yard pass from Bryce Young (Will Reichard kick), 5:30. Aggies 31–24. Drive: 6 plays, 75 yards, 2:34.

Fourth quarter

- ALA – Will Reichard 26-yard field goal, 14:04. Aggies 31–27. Drive: 9 plays, 48 yards, 4:50.
- ALA – Will Reichard 22-yard field goal, 8:44. Aggies 31–30. Drive: 13 plays, 64 yards, 4:18.
- ALA – Jameson Williams 7-yard pass from Bryce Young (Bryce Young pass to Jameson Williams), 5:00. Crimson Tide 38–31. Drive: 9 plays, 82 yards, 2:52.
- TAMU – Ainias Smith 25-yard pass from Zach Calzada (Seth Small kick), 3:00. Tied 38–38. Drive: 6 plays, 65 yards, 2:00.
- TAMU – Seth Small 28-yard field goal, 0:00. Aggies 41–38. Drive: 8 plays, 54 yards, 2:08.

Statistics

Statistics	ALA	TAMU
First downs	25	24
Total yards	522	379
Rushing yards	153	94
Passing yards	369	285
Turnovers	2	1
Time of possession	33:39	26:21

Team	Category	Player	Statistics
Alabama	Passing	Bryce Young	28/48, 369 yards, 3 TD, INT
Alabama	Rushing	Brian Robinson Jr.	24 rushes, 147 yards
Alabama	Receiving	Jameson Williams	10 receptions, 146 yards, 2 TD
Texas A&M	Passing	Zach Calzada	21/31, 285 yards, 3 TD, INT
Texas A&M	Rushing	Isaiah Spiller	17 rushes, 46 yards, TD
Texas A&M	Receiving	Ainias Smith	6 receptions, 85 yards, 2 TD

Texas A&M defeated Alabama for the first time since November 10, 2012. This marked the first time Nick Saban had lost to a former assistant coach; prior to this his record was 24–0 against former assistant coaches. This was Alabama's first loss to an unranked opponent since 2007, where they lost to Louisiana-Monroe. The 100-game win streak against unranked opponents by Alabama was also snapped by Texas A&M. It is also the first time an AP No. 1 team lost to an unranked team since 2008, when USC was defeated by Oregon State.

=== At Missouri ===
No. 21 Texas A&M Aggies at Missouri Tigers – Game summary

Quarter	1	2	3	4	Total
No. 21 Aggies	21	7	7	0	35
Tigers	0	7	7	0	14

at Faurot Field, Columbia, Missouri

- Date: October 16
- Game time: 11:00 a.m.
- Game weather: Temperature: 56 °F (13 °C) • Weather: Sunny • Wind: NW 13 MPH
- Game attendance: 48,139
- Referee: Ken Williamson
- TV announcers (SECN): Taylor Zarzour (play-by-play) and Matt Stinchcomb (analyst)
- Box score, Recap

Game information
First quarter
- TAMU – Ainias Smith 2-yard pass from Zach Calzada (Seth Small kick), 11:25. Aggies 7–0. Drive: 4 plays, 22 yards, 1:58.
- TAMU – Isaiah Spiller 48-yard run (Seth Small kick), 7:55. Aggies 14–0. Drive: 5 plays, 89 yards, 1:33.
- TAMU – De’Von Achane 20-yard run (Seth Small kick), 2:43. Aggies 21–0. Drive: 8 plays, 84 yards, 3:13.

Second quarter

- MIZ – Tyler Badie 32-yard run (Harrison Mevis kick), 8:09. Aggies 21–7. Drive: 5 plays, 66 yards, 2:34.
- TAMU – Ainias Smith 11-yard pass from Zach Calzada (Seth Small kick), 4:45. Aggies 28–7. Drive: 7 plays, 75 yards, 3:24.

Third quarter

- MIZ – Dominic Lovett 7-yard run (Harrison Mevis kick), 8:12. Aggies 28–14. Drive: 14 plays, 97 yards, 5:34.
- TAMU – De’Von Achane 1-yard run (Seth Small kick), 2:33. Aggies 35–14. Drive: 12 plays, 75 yards, 5:39.

Fourth quarter

- No scoring plays

Statistics

Statistics	TAMU	MIZ
First downs	29	19
Total yards	431	328
Rushing yards	283	98
Passing yards	148	230
Turnovers	1	2
Time of possession	29:57	30:03

Team	Category	Player	Statistics
Texas A&M	Passing	Zach Calzada	13/25, 148 yards, 2 TD, INT
Texas A&M	Rushing	Isaiah Spiller	20 rushes, 168 yards 1 TD
Texas A&M	Receiving	Ainias Smith	3 receptions, 34 yards 2 TD
Missouri	Passing	Connor Bazelak	29/43, 230 yards, 2 INT
Missouri	Rushing	Tyler Badie	22 rushes 68 yards 1 TD
Missouri	Receiving	Tauskie Dove	5 receptions, 65 yards

=== South Carolina ===
South Carolina Gamecocks at No. 17 Texas A&M Aggies – Game summary

Quarter	1	2	3	4	Total
Gamecocks	0	0	0	14	14
No. 17 Aggies	14	17	10	3	44

at Kyle Field, College Station, Texas

- Date: October 23
- Game time: 6:30 p.m.
- Game weather: Sunny
- Game attendance: 103,889
- Referee: Steve Marlowe
- TV announcers (SECN): Tom Hart (play-by-play), Jordan Rodgers (analyst) and Cole Cubelic (sideline)
- Box score, Recap

Game information
First quarter
- TAMU – Ainias Smith 95-yard punt return (Seth Small kick), 12:30. Aggies 7–0.
- TAMU – Jalen Wydermyer 25-yard pass from Zach Calzada (Seth Small kick), 0:57. Aggies 14–0. Drive: 10 plays, 90 yards, 4:44.

Second quarter

- TAMU – Jalen Wydermyer 28-yard pass from Zach Calzada (Seth Small kick), 10:36. Aggies 21–0. Drive: 9 plays, 73 yards, 4:12.
- TAMU – Isaiah Spiller 1-yard run (Seth Small kick), 8:36. Aggies 28–0. Drive: 3 plays, 6 yards, 0:40.
- TAMU – Seth Small 32-yard field goal, 0:00. Aggies 31–0. Drive: 14 plays, 79 yards, 7:05.

Third quarter

- TAMU – Seth Small 28-yard field goal, 12:03. Aggies 34–0. Drive: 9 plays, 64 yards, 2:57.
- TAMU – De’Von Achane 35-yard run (Seth Small kick), 3:01. Aggies 41–0. Drive: 5 plays, 74 yards, 2:23.

Fourth quarter

- TAMU – Seth Small 31-yard field goal, 14:54. Aggies 44–0. Drive: 5 plays, 20 yards, 1:21.
- SC – MarShawn Lloyd 9-yard run (Parker White kick), 12:07. Aggies 44–7. Drive: 7 plays, 75 yards, 2:47.
- SC – Traevon Kenion 12-yard pass from Jason Brown (Parker White kick), 0:12. Aggies 44–14. Drive: 9 plays, 59 yards, 1:45.

Statistics

Statistics	SC	TAMU
First downs	14	26
Total yards	185	477
Rushing yards	71	290
Passing yards	114	187
Turnovers	3	1
Time of possession	24:30	35:30

Team	Category	Player	Statistics
South Carolina	Passing	Jason Brown	8/14, 84 yards, TD, 2 INT
South Carolina	Rushing	ZaQuandre White	8 rushes, 59 yards
South Carolina	Receiving	Josh Vann	2 receptions, 32 yards
Texas A&M	Passing	Zach Calzada	12/24, 187 yards, 2 TD, INT
Texas A&M	Rushing	De’Von Achane	20 rushes, 154 yards, TD
Texas A&M	Receiving	Jalen Wydermyer	4 receptions, 75 yards, 2 TD

=== No. 13 Auburn ===
No. 13 Auburn Tigers at No. 14 Texas A&M Aggies – Game summary

Quarter	1	2	3	4	Total
No. 13 Tigers	3	0	0	0	3
No. 14 Aggies	3	0	3	14	20

at Kyle Field, College Station, Texas

- Date: November 6
- Game time: 2:30 p.m.
- Game weather: Temperature: 69 °F (21 °C) • Weather: Sunny • Wind: N 6 MPH
- Game attendance: 109,835
- Referee: James Carter
- TV announcers (CBS): Brad Nessler (play-by-play), Gary Danielson (analyst) and Jamie Erdahl (sideline)
- Box score, Recap

Game information
First quarter
- TAMU – Seth Small 21-yard field goal, 7:12. Aggies 3–0. Drive: 14 plays, 80 yards, 5:21.
- AUB – Anders Carlson 32-yard field goal, 0:20. Tied 3–3. Drive: 14 plays, 60 yards, 6:52.

Second quarter

- No scoring plays

Third quarter

- TAMU – Seth Small 29-yard field goal, 3:39. Aggies 6–3. Drive: 10 plays, 68 yards, 5:37.

Fourth quarter

- TAMU – Seth Small 47-yard field goal, 13:40. Aggies 9–3. Drive: 9 plays, 58 yards, 3:19.
- TAMU – Micheal Clemons 24-yard fumble return (Zach Calzada pass to Ainias Smith), 13:04. Aggies 17–3.
- TAMU – Seth Small 37-yard field goal, 3:15. Aggies 20–3. Drive: 7 plays, 26 yards, 3:35.

Statistics

Statistics	AUB	TAMU
First downs	17	18
Total yards	226	409
Rushing yards	73	217
Passing yards	153	192
Turnovers	2	1
Time of possession	29:56	30:00

Team	Category	Player	Statistics
Auburn	Passing	Bo Nix	20/41, 153 yards, INT
Auburn	Rushing	Tank Bigsby	15 rushes, 69 yards
Auburn	Receiving	John Samuel Shenker	4 receptions, 50 yards
Texas A&M	Passing	Zach Calzada	15/29, 192 yards
Texas A&M	Rushing	Isaiah Spiller	21 rushes, 112 yards
Texas A&M	Receiving	Caleb Chapman	3 receptions, 77 yards

=== At No. 15 Ole Miss ===
No. 11 Texas A&M Aggies at No. 15 Ole Miss Rebels – Game summary

Quarter	1	2	3	4	Total
No. 11 Aggies	0	0	10	9	19
No. 15 Rebels	10	5	0	14	29

at Vaught–Hemingway Stadium, Oxford, Mississippi

- Date: November 13
- Game time: 6:00 p.m.
- Game weather: Temperature: 46 °F (8 °C) • Weather: Sunny • Wind: NW 6 MPH
- Game attendance: 64,425
- Referee: David Smith
- TV announcers (ESPN): Chris Fowler (play-by-play), Kirk Herbstreit (color), Holly Rowe (sideline)
- Box score, Recap

Game information
First quarter
- MISS – Caden Costa 33-yard field goal, 12:56. Rebels 3–0. Drive: 9 plays, 58 yards, 2:04.
- MISS – Dontario Drummond 2-yard pass from Matt Corral (Caden Costa kick), 6:48. Rebels 10–0. Drive: 14 plays, 94 yards, 4:12.

Second quarter

- MISS – Caden Costa 32-yard field goal, 9:34. Rebels 13–0. Drive: 9 plays, 75 yards, 2:55.
- MISS – Isaiah Spiller tackled in own end zone, 4:00. Rebels 15–0.

Third quarter

- TAMU – Seth Small 30-yard field goal, 10:03. Rebels 15–3. Drive: 12 plays, 62 yards, 4:57.
- TAMU – De’Von Achane 24-yard run (Seth Small kick), 6:24. Rebels 15–10. Drive: 7 plays, 88 yards, 3:06.

Fourth quarter

- TAMU – Seth Small 43-yard field goal, 10:19. Rebels 15–13. Drive: 9 plays, 55 yards, 3:19.
- MISS – Snoop Conner 13-yard run (Caden Costa kick), 6:32. Rebels 22–13. Drive: 2 plays, 14 yards, 0:25.
- MISS – A. J. Finley 52-yard interception return (Caden Costa kick), 4:50. Rebels 29–13.
- TAMU – De’Von Achane 9-yard run (pass failed), 3:11. Rebels 29–19. Drive: 6 plays, 69 yards, 1:39.

Statistics

Statistics	TAMU	MISS
First downs	19	32
Total yards	378	504
Rushing yards	141	257
Passing yards	237	247
Turnovers	2	1
Time of possession	29:50	30:10

Team	Category	Player	Statistics
Texas A&M	Passing	Zach Calzada	24/42, 237 yards, 2 INT
Texas A&M	Rushing	De’Von Achane	12 rushes, 110 yards, 2 TD
Texas A&M	Receiving	Ainias Smith	5 receptions, 77 yards
Ole Miss	Passing	Matt Corral	24/37, 247 yards, TD
Ole Miss	Rushing	Jerrion Ealy	24 rushes, 152 yards
Ole Miss	Receiving	Jahcour Pearson	5 receptions, 69 yards

=== Prairie View A&M ===
Prairie View A&M Panthers at No. 16 Texas A&M Aggies – Game summary

Quarter	1	2	3	4	Total
Panthers	0	0	3	0	3
No. 16 Aggies	21	17	7	7	52

at Kyle Field, College Station, Texas

- Date: November 20
- Game time: 11:00 a.m.
- Game weather: Fog
- Game attendance: 98,251
- Referee: Steve Marlowe
- TV announcers (ESPN+): Mike Corey (play-by-play) and Dave Steckel (analyst)
- Box score, Recap

Game information
First quarter
- TAMU – Isaiah Spiller 11-yard run (Seth Small kick), 8:31. Aggies 7–0. Drive: 10 plays, 55 yards, 4:58.
- TAMU – De’Von Achane 1-yard run (Seth Small kick), 5:39. Aggies 14–0. Drive: 4 plays, 34 yards, 1:21.
- TAMU – Aaron Hansford fumble recovery in end zone (Seth Small kick), 4:55. Aggies 21–0.

Second quarter

- TAMU – Seth Small 27-yard field goal, 13:01. Aggies 24–0. Drive: 7 plays, 50 yards, 2:13.
- TAMU – Moose Muhammad III 33-yard pass from Zach Calzada (Seth Small kick), 5:22. Aggies 31–0. Drive: 7 plays, 64 yards, 3:26.
- TAMU – De’Von Achane 1-yard run (Seth Small kick), 0:06. Aggies 38–0. Drive: 7 plays, 60 yards, 3:21.

Third quarter

- TAMU – Moose Muhammad III 30-yard pass from Zach Calzada (Seth Small kick), 12:29. Aggies 45–0. Drive: 5 plays, 66 yards, 2:24.
- PV – Luis Reyes 25-yard field goal, 5:46. Aggies 45–3. Drive: 13 plays, 67 yards, 6:43.

Fourth quarter

- TAMU – Amari Daniels 8-yard run (Seth Small kick), 13:47. Aggies 52–3. Drive: 12 plays, 74 yards, 6:31.

Statistics

Statistics	PV	TAMU
First downs	9	24
Total yards	154	447
Rushing yards	147	279
Passing yards	7	168
Turnovers	1	1
Time of possession	29:35	30:25

Team	Category	Player	Statistics
Prairie View A&M	Passing	Trazon Connley	1/7, 5 yards
Prairie View A&M	Rushing	Jaden Stewart	24 rushes, 100 yards
Prairie View A&M	Receiving	Bernard Goodwater	1 reception, 5 yards
Texas A&M	Passing	Zach Calzada	10/14, 150 yards, 2 TD
Texas A&M	Rushing	Isaiah Spiller	9 rushes, 70 yards, TD
Texas A&M	Receiving	Moose Muhammad III	5 receptions, 77 yards, 2 TD

=== At LSU ===
No. 15 Texas A&M Aggies at LSU Tigers – Game summary

Quarter	1	2	3	4	Total
No. 15 Aggies	0	7	3	14	24
Tigers	3	14	3	7	27

at Tiger Stadium, Baton Rouge, Louisiana

- Date: November 27
- Game time: 6:00 p.m.
- TV announcers (ESPN): Tom Hart (play-by-play), Jordan Rodgers (analyst) and Cole Cubelic (sideline)

Game information
First quarter
- LSU – Cade York 50-yard field goal, 8:38. Tigers 3–0. Drive: 13 plays, 44 yards, 6:22.

Second quarter

- LSU – Jaray Jenkins 45-yard pass from Max Johnson (Cade York kick), 14:12. Tigers 10–0. Drive: 4 plays, 66 yards, 1:56.
- TAMU – Moose Muhammad III 13-yard pass from Zach Calzada (Seth Small kick), 4:31. Tigers 10–7. Drive: 7 plays, 73 yards, 3:46.
- LSU – Trey Palmer 61-yard pass from Max Johnson (Cade York kick), 0:32. Tigers 17–7. Drive: 2 plays, 62 yards, 0:34.

Third quarter

- TAMU – Seth Small 33-yard field goal, 8:09. Tigers 17–10. Drive: 10 plays, 63 yards, 4:42.
- LSU – Cade York 47-yard field goal, 2:29. Tigers 20–10. Drive: 9 plays, 59 yards, 3:23.

Fourth quarter

- TAMU – Jalen Preston 17-yard pass from Zach Calzada (Seth Small kick), 14:22. Tigers 20–17. Drive: 7 plays, 75 yards, 3:07.
- TAMU – Jalen Preston 32-yard pass from Zach Calzada (Seth Small kick), 7:33. Aggies 24–20. Drive: 6 plays, 45 yards, 2:34.
- LSU – Jaray Jenkins 28-yard pass from Max Johnson (Cade York kick), 0:20. Tigers 27–24. Drive: 9 plays, 85 yards, 1:38.

Statistics

Statistics	TAMU	LSU
First downs	16	22
Total yards	296	412
Rushing yards	54	106
Passing yards	242	306
Turnovers	0	0
Time of possession	27:40	32:20

Team	Category	Player	Statistics
Texas A&M	Passing	Zach Calzada	20/35, 242 yards, 3 TD
Texas A&M	Rushing	De’Von Achane	12 rushes, 49 yards
Texas A&M	Receiving	De’Von Achane	5 receptions, 72 yards
LSU	Passing	Max Johnson	22/38, 306 yards, 3 TD
LSU	Rushing	Tyrion Davis-Price	19 rushes, 84 yards
LSU	Receiving	Jaray Jenkins	8 receptions, 169 yards, 2 TD

== Rankings ==
Ranking movements Legend: ██ Increase in ranking ██ Decrease in ranking RV = Received votes
	Week															
Poll	Pre	1	2	3	4	5	6	7	8	9	10	11	12	13	14	Final
AP	6	5	7	7	15	RV	21	17	14	13	11	16	14	24	23	RV
Coaches	6	5	5	5	13	RV	18	17	14	12	11	16	14	23	23	25
CFP	Not released									14	11	16	15	25	25	Not released
