= 2021 Kansas State Wildcats football team =

American college football season

2021 Kansas State Wildcats football

Texas Bowl champion

Texas Bowl, W 42–20 vs. LSU
- Conference: Big 12 Conference
- Record: 8–5 (4–5 Big 12)
- Head coach: Chris Klieman (3rd season)
- Offensive coordinator: Courtney Messingham (3rd season)
- Offensive scheme: Pro-style
- Defensive coordinator: Joe Klanderman (2nd season)
- Base defense: 3–3–5
- Home stadium: Bill Snyder Family Football Stadium

Uniform
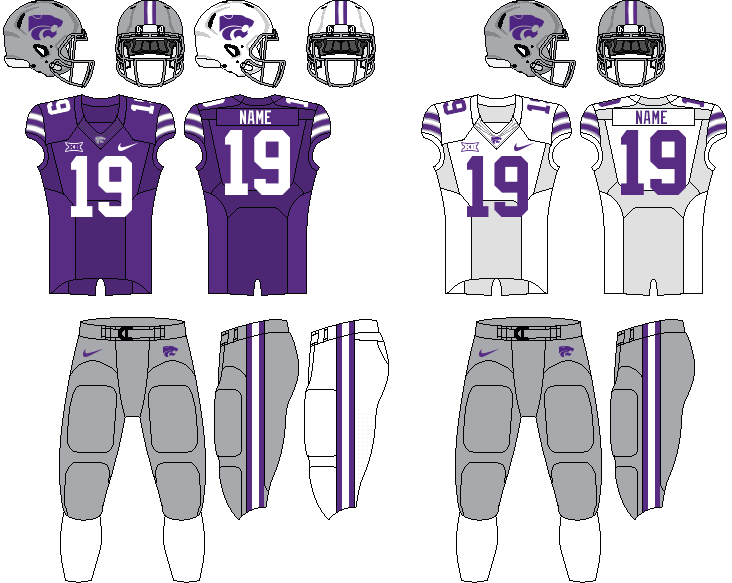

2021 Big 12 Conference football standings
	Conf.			Overall
Team	W		L	W		L
No. 7 Oklahoma State y	8	–	1	12	–	2
No. 5 Baylor y$	7	–	2	12	–	2
No. 10 Oklahoma	7	–	2	11	–	2
Iowa State	5	–	4	7	–	6
Kansas State	4	–	5	8	–	5
West Virginia	4	–	5	6	–	7
Texas	3	–	6	5	–	7
TCU	3	–	6	5	–	7
Texas Tech	3	–	6	7	–	6
Kansas	1	–	8	2	–	10
Championship: Baylor 21, Oklahoma State 16
$ – Conference champion; y – Championship game participant; Rankings from AP Poll

The 2021 Kansas State Wildcats football team represented Kansas State University during the 2021 NCAA Division I FBS football season. The Wildcats played their home games at the Bill Snyder Family Football Stadium in Manhattan, Kansas, and competed in the Big 12 Conference. The team was led by third-year head coach Chris Klieman.

== Previous season ==
The Wildcats finished the 2020 regular season 4–6 and 4–5 in Big 12 play to finish in seventh in the conference. They removed themselves from consideration to play in a post season bowl game.

== Preseason ==
=== Big 12 media poll ===
Big 12 media poll
Predicted finish	Team	Votes (1st place)
1	Oklahoma	365 (35)
2	Iowa State	351 (4)
3	Texas	273
4	Oklahoma State	266
5	TCU	255
6	West Virginia	185
7	Kansas State	163
8	Baylor	124
9	Texas Tech	103
10	Kansas	39

== Schedule ==
The 2021 schedule consisted of 7 home, 5 away, and 1 neutral site game in the regular season.

Date	Time	Opponent	Rank	Site	TV	Result	Attendance
September 4, 2021	11:00 a.m.	vs. Stanford*		AT&T Stadium; Arlington, TX (Allstate Kickoff Classic)	FS1	W 24–7	28,668
September 11	6:00 p.m.	No. 8 (FCS) Southern Illinois*		Bill Snyder Family Football Stadium; Manhattan, KS	ESPN+	W 31–23	47,628
September 18	1:00 p.m.	Nevada*		Bill Snyder Family Football Stadium; Manhattan, KS	ESPN+	W 38–17	48,768
September 25	6:00 p.m.	at Oklahoma State	No. 25	Boone Pickens Stadium; Stillwater, OK	ESPN+	L 20–31	51,444
October 2	2:30 pm	No. 6 Oklahoma		Bill Snyder Family Football Stadium; Manhattan, KS	FOX	L 31–37	47,690
October 16	6:30 p.m.	Iowa State		Bill Snyder Family Football Stadium; Manhattan, KS (rivalry)	ESPN2	L 20–33	48,363
October 23	11:00 a.m.	at Texas Tech		Jones AT&T Stadium; Lubbock, TX	FS1	W 25–24	52,874
October 30	2:30 p.m.	TCU^{†}		Bill Snyder Family Football Stadium; Manhattan, KS	ESPNU	W 31–12	44,339
November 6	11:00 a.m.	at Kansas		David Booth Kansas Memorial Stadium; Lawrence, KS (rivalry)	FS1	W 35–10	30,611
November 13	11:00 a.m.	West Virginia		Bill Snyder Family Football Stadium; Manhattan, KS	FS1	W 34–17	43,932
November 20	4:30 p.m.	No. 11 Baylor		Bill Snyder Family Football Stadium; Manhattan, KS	FS1	L 10–20	43,857
November 26	11:00 a.m.	at Texas		Darrell K Royal–Texas Memorial Stadium; Austin, TX (Big Noon Kickoff)	FOX	L 17–22	75,072
January 4, 2022	8:00 p.m.	vs. LSU*		NRG Stadium; Houston, TX (Texas Bowl)	ESPN	W 42–20	52,207
*Non-conference game; ^{†}Homecoming; Rankings from AP Poll (and CFP Rankings, after November 2) - Released prior to game; All times are in Central time

== Game summaries ==
=== Vs. Stanford ===
Allstate Kickoff Classic

Team	1	2	3	4	Total
Stanford	0	0	0	7	7
• Kansas State	7	7	0	10	24

- Date: September 4
- Location: Arlington, TX
- Game start: 11:00 a.m. CDT
- Game attendance: 28,668
- Game weather: Indoors
- Referee: Chris Coyte
- TV announcers (FS1): Aaron Goldsmith (play-by-play) and Mark Helfrich (analyst)

Scoring summary
1	3:06	KSU	Skyler Thompson 6-yard run (Taiten Winkel kick) (2 plays, 62 yards, 0:56)	KSU 7–0
2	6:17	KSU	Deuce Vaughn 59–yard run (Taiten Winkel kick) (3 plays, 71 yards, 1:39)	KSU 14–0
4	10:08	KSU	Taiten Winkel 40-yard field goal (9 plays, 44 yards, 4:43)	KSU 17–0
4	7:10	KSU	Skylar Thompson 13–yard run (Taiten Winkel kick) (2 plays, 20 yards, 0:46)	KSU 24–0
4	3:16	STAN	Brycen Tremayne 14–yard pass from Tanner McKee (Joshua Karty kick) (10 plays, 75 yards, 3:54)	KSU 24–7

Statistics	Stanford	Kansas State
First downs	14	15
Total yards	233	344
Rushing yards	39	200
Passing yards	194	144
Turnovers	2	1
Time of possession	32:53	27:07

Team	Category	Player	Statistics
Stanford	Passing	Tanner McKee	15/18, 118 yards, 1 TD
Stanford	Rushing	Austin Jones	9 carries, 25 yards, 0 TD
Stanford	Receiving	Brycen Tremayne	5 catches, 62 yards, 1 TD
Kansas State	Passing	Skylar Thompson	9/14, 144 yards, 0 TD, 1 INT
Kansas State	Rushing	Deuce Vaughn	13 carries, 128 yards, 1 TD
Kansas State	Receiving	Phillip Brooks	3 catches, 81 yards, 0 TD

Kansas State began with a 15-point lead at halftime with performances by quarterback Skylar Thompson and running back Deuce Vaughn. The Wildcats managed to score 24 points before allowing Stanford to put points on the board with 3:16 left in the game. Stanford coach David Shaw stated: "This game was not indicative of how hard we've played, how hard we've practiced and how well we practiced. Disappointing to me that we didn't go out there and execute better." Shaw is in his 11th season as Stanford's coach.

Kansas State dominated on defense and Stanford's offense continued to make mistakes while not producing a strong running game performance. Kansas State defense only allowed 39 total rushing yards for the game.

The Wichita Eagle reported that the stadium was mostly filled with Kansas State fans and that Kansas State significantly out-performed Stanford. Specifically, the paper published "The Kansas State football team opened its season with a statement victory on Saturday at AT&T Stadium."

Stanford's next game is their sixth consecutive road game, traveling to play the USC Trojans. Kansas State will play at home in Manhattan against Southern Illinois.

=== No. 8 (FCS) Southern Illinois ===
Team	1	2	3	4	Total
No. 8 (FCS) Southern Illinois	0	23	0	0	23
• Kansas State	14	7	3	7	31

- Date: September 11
- Location: Manhattan, KS
- Game start: 6:00 pm
- Game attendance: 47,628
- Game weather: 92, sunny, Wind South at 11 mph
- Referee: Chris Tallent
- TV announcers (ESPN+): Courtney Lyle (play-by-play), Brandon Weeden (color) and Shane Sparks (sideline)
- Sources: ESPN Box Score ESPN Team Stats

Statistics	Southern Illinois	Kansas State
First downs	17	24
Total yards	276	380
Rushing yards	100	208
Passing yards	176	172
Turnovers	3	4
Time of possession	26:04	33:37

Team	Category	Player	Statistics
Southern Illinois	Passing	Nik Baker	16/27 for 176 yards 0TD, 1 INT
Southern Illinois	Rushing	Javon Wiiliams Jr	12 carries for 46 yards, 2 TD
Southern Illinois	Receiving	Landon Lenoir	6 catches for 57 yards, 0 TD
Kansas State	Passing	Skylar Thompson	3/4 for 96 yards, 1 INT
Kansas State	Passing	Will Howard	8/17 for 76 yards, 1 INT
Kansas State	Rushing	Deuce Vaughn	26 carries for 120 yards, 3 TD
Kansas State	Receiving	Malik Knowles	4 catches 112 yards

Southern Illinois came in to the game with split #8/#9 rankings in the FCS. Before the game, SIU head coach Nick Hill said his team will focus on running: "We're gonna to try to establish [sic] the line of scrimmage and run the ball, but ultimately it's our job to move the ball, whatever you've gotta do." SIU defeated Southeast Missouri State the previous week by a score of 47–21.

Kansas State was leading 21–3 in the second quarter when starting quarterback Skylar Thompson left the game with an injured knee. With backup quarterback Will Howard stepping in, SIU pulled ahead at halftime 23–21 with multiple mistakes for Kansas State. SIU failed to score in the second half and Kansas State was able to pull ahead to win 31–23.

Bright spots for Kansas State include Deuce Vaughn's rushing touchdown with less than two minutes in the game and a forced fumble at the end to close out the game. Highlights for SIU included Cornerback P. J. Jules returning a 41-yard interception for the team's first defensive touchdown since 2018, and safety Qua Brown produced a team-high nine tackles in the game. Southern Illinois also forced three turnovers in a row against the K-State offense.

After the game, plans seem to point to Howard taking the starting reigns like he did in the previous season. Coach Klieman said that he will be staying for the "foreseeable future" at K-State. In 2020, Howard led K-State to victories over Texas Tech, TCU, and Kansas. SIU will host Dayton the next week in the first of fime home games.

=== Nevada ===
Team	1	2	3	4	Total
Nevada	7	0	10	0	17
• Kansas State	7	10	0	21	38

- Date: September 18
- Location: Manhattan, KS
- Game start: 1:00 pm
- Elapsed time: 3 hours and 25 minutes
- Game attendance: 48,768
- Game weather: Temperature: 86 °F (30 °C) • Weather: Sunny • Wind: SW 6 MPH
- Referee: David Alvarez
- TV announcers (ESPN+): Shawn Kenney (play–by–play), Barrett Brooks (analyst) and Shane Sparks (sideline)
- Sources: ESPN Box Score | ESPN Team Stats

Scoring summary
1	14:16	KSU	Daniel Imatorbhebhe 68–yard pass from Will Howard (Taiten Winkel kick) (2 plays, 75 yards, 0:44)	KSU 7–0
1	00:08	NEV	Devonte Lee 1–yard run (Brandon Talton kick) (8 plays, 74 yards, 2:31)	TIE 7–7
2	11:42	KSU	Joe Ervin 22–yard run (Taiten Winkel kick) (8 plays, 75 yards, 3:26)	KSU 14–7
2	02:08	KSU	Taiten Winkel 37–yard field goal (10 plays, 38 yards, 4:37)	KSU 17–7
3	10:35	NEV	Brandon Talton 46–yard field goal (8 plays, 47 yards, 4:06)	KSU 17–10
3	04:08	NEV	Elijah Cooks 14–yard pass from Carson Strong (Brandon Talton kick) (9 plays, 42 yards, 5:07)	TIE 17–17
4	14:54	KSU	Deuce Vaughn 11–yard run (Taiten Winkel kick) (8 plays, 75 yards, 4:14)	KSU 24–17
4	06:12	KSU	Will Howard 2–yard run (Taiten Winkel kick) (11 plays, 62 yards, 6:09)	KSU 31–17
4	01:12	KSU	Will Howard 1–yard run (Taiten Winkel kick) (8 plays, 31 yards, 4:11)	KSU 38–17

Statistics	Nevada	Kansas State
First downs	14	22
Total yards	331	398
Rushing yards	25	269
Passing yards	306	129
Turnovers	1	0
Time of possession	29:00	31:00

Team	Category	Player	Statistics
Nevada	Passing	Carson Strong	27/40, 262 yards, 6.6 yds ave, 1 TD, 1 INT
Nevada	Rushing	Devonte Lee	10 carries, 24 yards, 2.4 yds ave, 1 td, long 6 yd
Nevada	Receiving	Elijah Cooks	4 rec, 45 yards, 11.3 yards ave, 1 TD, long 24 yds
Kansas State	Passing	Will Howard	7/10, 123 yards, 12.3 yds ave, 1 TD, 0 INT
Kansas State	Rushing	Deuce Vaughn	23 carries, 127 yards, 5.5 yards ave, 1 TD, long 15 yds
Kansas State	Receiving	Daniel Imatorbhebhe	1 for 68 yards, 68.0 yards ave, 1 TD, long 68 yds

In the week prior, Nevada completed their second win of the season by defeating Idaho State by a score of 49–10 and is at the top of the Mountain West Conference with a 2–0 record. Oddsmakers go into the game considering the two teams to be well matched and expect a close game: both teams have combined to score 48.5 points against their opponents in two games and both teams have the same record of 2 wins and 0 losses.

Nevada brought 6 foot 4 inch Carson Strong as their quarterback, who has been widely touted as a sought-after future quarterback for the National Football League. Kansas State defense is looking forward to the challenge. Coach Klieman's game plans include using the defensive line to put pressure on strong in the backfield and having the defensive backs "play the ball in the air" and go for interceptions.

Kansas State spent most of the game on the ground, led by Deuce Vaughn with 127 yards and one touchdown. In this game, Sophomore Vaughn because the fastest in team history to achieve 1,000 career rushing yards in just 13 games. Kansas State ran the football 48 times and only made 13 passing attempts.

Wildcat quarterback Jaren Lewis also got some time after three drives. Lewis completed 2 for 3 passes with 9 yards. Kansas State made a touchdown and field goal under his two drives. Kansas State led 17–7 at halftime, but Nevada tied the game 17–17 in the third quarter. It was in the fourth quarter when Kansas State made a clear statement for victory by scoring three touchdowns.

Sophomore quarterback Will Howard rushed for 56 yards and 2 touchdowns. He did complete 7 of 10 passing attempts including a 68-yard touchdown pass to Daniel Imatorbhebhe on the second play of the game.

Kansas State's defense allowed a season-high 331 yards, but only 25 on the ground. Nevada quarterback Carson strong wa sacked three times, one more than in their first two games combined. The final score was Kansas State 38, Nevada 17.

Nevada's Carson Strong was successful in passing to nine different receivers. His 14-yard touchdown pass to Elijah Cooks tied the score at 17 in the third quarter. Nevada manage to tie the score up twice (7–7 and 17–17) but never held the lead.

Kansas State improved to 3–0 with the win and reduced Nevada to throwing short instead of long. K-State Coach Klieman said, "We challenged the guys early in the week that we needed to take the next step as a football team. We were prepared for it. We were built for this."

Nevada is idle next week but then travels to play Boise State on October 2.

=== At Oklahoma State ===
Team	1	2	3	4	Total
No. 25 Kansas State	10	3	7	0	20
• Oklahoma State	21	10	0	0	31

- Date: September 25
- Location: Stillwater, OK
- Game start: 6:00 p.m. CDT
- Game attendance: 51,444
- Game weather: 86, sunny, 12 mph SW
- Referee: Michael Vandervelde
- TV announcers (ESPN+): Shawn Kenney (play-by-play), Ryan Leaf (analyst), and Shane Sparks (sideline)
- Sources: ESPN box score ESPN team stats

Scoring summary
1	8:51	KSU	Taiten Winkel 32-yard field goal (13 plays, 68 yards, 6:03)	KSU 3–0
1	6:32	OSU	Spencer Sanders 2-yard rush (Alex Hale kick) (7 plays, 75 yards, 2:19)	OSU 7–3
1	6:18	KSU	Malik Knowles 99-yard knockout (Taiten Winkel kick)	KSU 10–7
1	3:26	OSU	Spencer Sanders 20-yard pass to Brennan Presley (Alex Hale kick) (7 plays, 73 yards, 2:46)	OSU 14–10
1	3:15	OSU	Malcolm Rodriguez fumble touchdown recovery (Alex Hale kick)	OSU 21–10
2	10:51	OSU	Spencer Sanders 7-yard pass to Tay Martin (Alex Hale kick) (11 plays, 90 yards, 4:42)	OSU 28–10
2	4:21	OSU	Alex Hale 20-yard field goal (11 plays, 88 yards, 4:27)	OSU 31–10
2	0:00	KSU	Taiten Winkel 45-yard field goal (4 plays, 33 yards, 0:38)	OSU 31–13
3	1:08	KSU	Jaren Lewis 55-yard pass to Deuce Vaughn (Taiten Winkel kick) (3 plays, 85 yards, 1:28)	OSU 31–20

Statistics	Oklahoma State	Kansas State
First downs	25	12
Total yards	481	260
Rushing yards	137	62
Passing yards	344	198
Turnovers	0	2
Time of possession	35:06	24:54

Team	Category	Player	Statistics
Oklahoma State	Passing	Spencer Sanders	22/34, 344 yards, 2 TD, 0 INT
Oklahoma State	Rushing	Jaylen Warren	27 attempts, 123 yards
Oklahoma State	Receiving	Tay Martin	9 catches, 100 yards, 1 TD
Kansas State	Passing	Jaren Lewis	10/19 148 yards, 1 TD, 1 INT
Kansas State	Rushing	Will Howard	3 attempts, 28 yards
Kansas State	Receiving	Deuce Vaughn	5 receptions, 73 yards, 1 TD

In the previous week, Oklahoma State narrowly defeated Boise State 21–20 in the face of a few injuries in their starting lineup. Oklahoma State was ranked No. 22 in the Coaches Poll, and Kansas State was ranked No. 25 in the AP Poll.

Kansas State's defense prevented Oklahoma state from scoring any points in the second half of the game, but the 31 points scored in the first half was enough for the Cowboys to win. Kansas State switched quarterbacks during the game as second-string Will Howard started the game but was injured and Jaren Lewis took over the bulk of the duties. Oklahoma state won 31–20.

=== No. 6 Oklahoma ===
Team	1	2	3	4	Total
• No. 6 Oklahoma	3	10	14	10	37
Kansas State	7	3	7	14	31

- Date: October 2
- Location: Manhattan, KS
- Game start: 2:30 p.m. CDT
- Game attendance: 47,690
- Game weather: Cloudy • Temperature: 73 °F (23 °C)
- Referee: Kevin Hassell
- TV announcers (FOX): Aaron Goldsmith (play-by-play) and Brock Huard (analyst)
- Sources: ESPN box score ESPN team stats

Scoring summary
1	4:42	OKLA	Gabe Brkic 40-yard field goal (7 plays, -4 yards, 4:03)	OU 3–0
1	0:11	KSU	Skylar Thompson 2-yard pass to Phillip Brooks (Taiten Winkel kick) (10 plays, 75 yards, 4:31)	KSU 7–3
2	10:19	OKLA	Jeremiah Hall 4-yard rush (Gabe Brkic kick) (12 plays, 75 yards, 4:52)	OU 10–7
2	1:30	KSU	Taiten Winkel 30-yard field goal (19 plays, 63 yards, 8:49)	TIED 10–10
2	0:02	OKLA	Gabe Brkic 27-yard field goal (9 plays, 65 yards, 1:28)	OU 13–10
3	11:40	OKLA	Kennedy Brooks 2-yard rush (Gabe Brkic kick) (9 plays, 75 yards, 3:20)	OU 20–10
3	5:30	OKLA	Spencer Rattler 14-yard pass to Michael Woods II (Gabe Brkick kick) (9 plays, 90 yards, 4:27)	OU 27–10
3	3:19	KSU	Skyler Thompson 7-yard pass to Deuce Vaughn (Taiten Winkel kick) (5 plays, 75 yards, 2:11)	OU 27–17
4	9:49	OKLA	Spencer Rattler 1-yard pass to Jeremiah Hall (Gabe Brkic kick) (6 plays, 52 yards, 3:16)	OU 34–17
4	4:15	OSU	Skyler Thompson 6-yard pass to Landry Weber (Taiten Winkel kick) (11 plays, 75 yards, 5:34)	OU 34–24
4	1:33	OSU	Gabe Brkic 47-yard field goal (6 plays, -5 yards, 2:41)	OU 37–24
4	1:20	OSU	Malik Knowles 93-yard kickoff return (Taiten Winkel kick)	OU 37–31

Statistics	Oklahoma	Kansas State
First downs	22	21
Total yards	393	420
Rushing yards	132	100
Passing yards	261	320
Turnovers	1	1
Time of possession	27:18	32:42

Team	Category	Player	Statistics
Oklahoma	Passing	Spencer Rattler	22/25 for 243 yards, 9.7 avg, 2 TD, 1 INT
Oklahoma	Rushing	Kennedy Brooks	15 car, 92 yds, 6.1 avg, 1 TD, 28 long
Oklahoma	Receiving	Marvin Mims	4, 71 yds, 17.8 avg, 0 TD, 50 long
Kansas State	Passing	Skylar Thompson	29/41 for 320 yards, 7.8 avg, 3 TD, 0 INT
Kansas State	Rushing	Deuce Vaughn	15 car, 51 ydds, 3.4 avg, 0 TD, 13 long
Kansas State	Receiving	Deuce Vaughn	10, 104 yards, 10.4 avg, 1 TD, 33 long

Skylar Thompson returned from injury to start the game at quarterback and developed a 7–3 lead early on, keeping the score tied at 10–10 until just before halftime when Oklahoma managed a field goal to pull ahead 13–10.

In the third quarter, Kansas State executed an onside kick and recovered the ball. After video review, the call on the field was confirmed as a Kansas State recovery. OU head coach Lincoln Riley then challenged the replay call for double-touching, claiming that Kansas State kicker Zentner contacted the ball twice while kicking it. The challenge was upheld after a second review and Oklahoma was given the ball at midfield. The second replay review was considered "controversial" and such challenges after video review are rare. This and another officiating call reversal were critical to the Oklahoma victory: final score Oklahoma 37, Kansas State 31.

=== Iowa State ===
Farmageddon

Team	1	2	3	4	Total
• Iowa State	10	10	7	6	33
Kansas State	7	0	0	13	20

- Date: October 16
- Location: Manhattan, KS
- Game start: 6:30 p.m.
- Game attendance: 48,363
- Game weather: 68 degrees, Sunny, NE 1 mph
- Referee: Scott Campbell
- TV announcers (ESPN2): Clay Matvick, Rocky Boiman, and Tiffany Blackmon
- Sources:ESPN box score ESPN team stats

Scoring summary
1	14:48	ISU	Breece Hall 75-yard run (Andrew Mevis kick) (1 play, 75 yards, 0:12)	ISU 7–0
1	7:36	ISU	Andrew Mevis 44-yard field goal (6 plays, 25 yards, 2:27)	ISU 10–0
1	3:58	KSU	Phillip Brooks 40-yard pass from Skyler Thompson (Taiten Winkel kick) (7 plays, 64 yards, 3:38)	ISU 10–7
2	5:02	ISU	Breece Hall 1-yard run (Connor Assalley kick) (13 plays, 80 yards, 7:08)	ISU 17–7
2	0:00	ISU	Andrew Mevis 41-yard field goal (7 plays, 40 yards, 2:27)	ISU 20–7
3	2:55	ISU	Sean Shaw Jr. 11-yard pass from Brock Purdy (Andrew Mevis kick) (18 plays, 93 yards, 10:02)	ISU 27–10
4	12:21	KSU	Skylar Thompson 1-yard run (Taiten Winkel PAT failed) (11 plays, 75 yards, 5:34)	ISU 27–13
4	9:09	ISU	Andrew Mevis 41-yard field goal (5 plays, 52 yards, 3:12)	ISU 30–13
4	5:05	KSU	Malik Knowles 9-yard pass from Skylar Thompson (Taiten Winkel kick) (11 plays, 75 yards, 4:04)	ISU 30–20
4	1:23	ISU	Andrew Mevis 40-yard field goal (8 plays, 22 yards, 3:42)	ISU 33–20

Statistics	Iowa State	Kansas State
First downs	19	21
Total yards	418	342
Rushing yards	210	136
Passing yards	208	206
Turnovers	0	1
Time of possession	33:45	26:15

Team	Category	Player	Statistics
Iowa State	Passing	Brock Purdy	22/25 for 208 yards, 8.3 avg, 1 TD
Iowa State	Rushing	Breece Hall	30 for 197 yards, 6.6 avg, 2 TD
Iowa State	Receiving	Jaylin Noel	5 for 48 yards, 9.6 avg
Kansas State	Passing	Skylar Thompson	15/23 for 206 yards, 9.0 avg, 2 TD, 1 INT
Kansas State	Rushing	Deuce Vaughn	18 for 99 yards, 5.5 avg
Kansas State	Receiving	Phillip Brooks	3 for 54 yards, 18.0 avg, 1 TD

The 2021 annual rivalry known as "Farmageddon" began with Kansas State winning 15 of the last 16 games played in Manhattan, but the pattern failed to hold as Iowa State outperformed Kansas State on the field and on the scoreboard. Kansas State failed to score in the second and third quarter, and only managed 20 points to Iowa State's consistent performance to tack up a total of 33.

Iowa State's Breece Hall ran 75 yards for a touchdown on the first play of the game, and Iowa State held the lead for the remainder of the game. The Iowa State offensive line was given credit for not allowing any sacks and giving quarterback Brock Purdy time to work. Iowa state converted 9 of 15 third downs through the game. Kansas State allowed Iowa state to gain half of its passing yards after the catch.

=== At Texas Tech ===
Team	1	2	3	4	Total
• Kansas State	0	10	9	6	25
Texas Tech	14	10	0	0	24

- Date: October 23
- Location: Lubbock, TX
- Game start: 11:00 am
- Game attendance: 52,874
- Game weather: Temperature: 72 °F (22 °C) • Weather: Sunny • Wind: SW 15 MPH
- Referee: Tutu Salaam
- TV announcers (FS1): Tim Brando (play-by-play), Spencer Tillman (analyst)
- Sources:ESPN box score ESPN team stats

Statistics	Texas Tech	Kansas State
First downs	14	17
Total yards	317	377
Rushing yards	169	81
Passing yards	148	296
Turnovers	1	2
Time of possession	24:55	35;05

Team	Category	Player	Statistics
Texas Tech	Passing	Henry Colombi	10/17 for 148 yards, 8.7 avg, 0 TD, 1 INT
Texas Tech	Rushing	SaRodorick Thompson	11 fr 46 yards, 4.2 avg, 2 TD, 28 Long
Texas Tech	Receiving	Myles Price	4 for 64 yards, 16.0 avg, 0 TD, 40 Long
Kansas State	Passing	Skylar Thompson	24/30 for 296 yards, 9.9 avg, 1 TD
Kansas State	Rushing	Deuce Vaughn	15 for 52 yards, avg 3.5, 2 TD, 12 Long
Kansas State	Receiving	Deuce Vaughn	7 for 68 yards, 9.7 avg, 1 TD, 26 Long

Texas Tech scored fast. On the second play of the game, Erik Ezukanma ran a 45-yard touchdown run. On the ensuing kickoff, Malik Knowles fumbled and Tyrique Matthews recovered the ball at the 23-yard-line which led the Red Raiders to be up 14–0. Texas Tech held a two-touchdown lead at halftime.

The second half worked out much differently. Kansas State moved one step closer to bowl eligibility and improved its overall record to 4–3. Kansas State brought standout great individual performances from Skylar Thompson, Deuce Vaughn, Felix Anudike-Uzomah and a punt by Ty Zentner. Zentner's 63-yard punt put Texas Tech at its own 4. On the next play, Anudike-Uzomah tackled the ball carrier in the end zone for a safety. Texas Tech likely would have won the game without those two plays.

“It would have been easy to quit the way the game started. After losing three straight games, starting the game like that was obviously not what we wanted. We easily could have folded. But guys kept on fighting. It speaks volumes about where we're at as a program and the type of players we have.” – Skylar Thompson

The final score was 25–24, a one-point victory for Kansas State. Texas Tech responded by firing head coach Matt Wells with his current record of 5 wins and 3 losses.

=== TCU ===
Team	1	2	3	4	Total
TCU	0	5	0	7	12
• Kansas State	7	14	0	10	31

- Date: October 30
- Location: Manhattan, KS
- Game start: 2:30 pm
- Game attendance: 44,339
- Game weather: 69 degrees, 8 mph, SW, Sunny
- Referee: Michael Vandervelde
- TV announcers (ESPNU): Mike Couzens, Dustin Fox
- Sources: ESPN box score ESPN team stats

Statistics	TCU	Kansas State
First downs	17	16
Total yards	340	388
Rushing yards	156	146
Passing yards	184	242
Turnovers	2	1
Time of possession	30:44	29:16

Team	Category	Player	Statistics
TCU	Passing	Chandler Morris	9/14, 111 yards, 0 TD, 0 INT
TCU	Rushing	Kendre Miller	14 for 102 yards, 0 TD, 61 long
TCU	Receiving	Derius Davis	4 for 78 yards, 0 TD, 30 long
Kansas State	Passing	Skylar Thompson	13/21 for 242 yards, 1 TD, 1 INT
Kansas State	Rushing	Deuce Vaughn	20 for 109 yards, 2 TFD, 42 long
Kansas State	Receiving	Daniel Imatorbhebhe	2 for 90 yards, 1 TD, 73 long

Last season TCU won five of their final six games and were considered a contender for the conference championship—but now come to the game with only 3 wins and 4 losses (1–3 in conference play) and may not qualify for a bowl game. TCU's previous game was a 29–17 home loss to West Virginia with three turnovers gave up 229 rushing yards. The Horned Frogs have allowed 5.4 yards per run so far this season—second to last in the Big 12.

Wildcat Felix Anudike-Uzomah set a new school and Big 12 record six sacks while also tying the NCAA single-game record. After a post-game stat adjustment, he was given credit for four sacks and two forced fumbles. TCU had two opportunities to score inside the 5 yard line, but the Kansas State defense held—the first time for the year that the Horned Frogs did not score while in the red zone.

Kansas State took the lead in the first quarter and held it for the entire game. TCU managed to pull within 7–3 in the second quarter, but Kansas State made it 14–3 on the next series with a 42-yard run by Deuce Vaughn.

TCU managed a safety and also produced some quality plays, including Kendre Miller on a 61-yard carry to the 2-yard line—but TCU could not complete the final two yards in four plays for a score. Their only score by the offense was a field goal. TCU did hold Kansas State scoreless in the third quarter.

On Sunday after the game, TCU fired head coach Gary Patterson and will have Jerry Kill take over on an interim basis.

=== At Kansas ===
Sunflower Showdown

Team	1	2	3	4	Total
• Kansas State	14	7	7	7	35
Kansas	0	3	7	0	10

- Date: November 6
- Location: David Booth Kansas Memorial Stadium • Lawrence, KS
- Game start: 11:00 am
- Game attendance: 30,611
- Game weather: Sunny • Temperature : 53 °F (12 °C), winds SW at 10mph
- Referee: Scott Campbell
- TV announcers (FS1): Adam Alexander, Devin Gardner
- Sources: ESPN box score ESPN team stats

Statistics	Kansas	Kansas State
First downs	15	22
Total yards	274	504
Rushing yards	88	242
Passing yards	186	262
Turnovers	0	0
Time of possession	31:38	28:22

Team	Category	Player	Statistics
Kansas	Passing	Jalon Daniels	13/19, 105 yards, 1 TD, 0 INT
Kansas	Rushing	Devin Neal	19 rushes, 62 yards, 0 TD
Kansas	Receiving	Kwamie Lassiter II	6 rec, 82 yards, 1 TD
Kansas State	Passing	Skylar Thompson	19/24, 244 yards, 1 TD, 0 INT
Kansas State	Rushing	Deuce Vaughn	11 rushes, 162 yards, 3 TD
Kansas State	Receiving	Malik Knowles	3 rec, 94 yards, 1 TD

Coming into the game, the Jayhawks had only managed one win. Kansas State averaged 27.5 points per game, while KU had averaged 15.8, but the Wildcats turned the ball over 12 times in the season so far to KU's 10 turnovers. The Jayhawks came off a 55–3 loss against #15 Oklahoma State, but just two weeks prior had a 10–0 lead on Oklahoma at halftime.

Kansas State scored first and held the lead for the remainder of the game. Deuce Vaughn had a 30-yard carry and ended the drive with a touchdown. The Jayhawks responded with a field goal to put the score 7–3 in the first quarter. Two plays later Kansas State scored on a 68-yard touchdown pass.

Kansas State won the game 35-10 and dominated in other statistics along the way: The Wildcats managed 10 yards per play in the first three quarters, went 6–9 on third downs and piled on 499 total yards

=== West Virginia ===
Team	1	2	3	4	Total
West Virginia	0	3	7	7	17
• Kansas State	14	3	7	10	34

- Date: November 13
- Location: Manhattan, KS
- Game start: 11:00 a.m.
- Game attendance: 43,932
- Game weather: 36 degree, wind S 4mph, Sunny
- Referee: Brandon Cruse
- TV announcers (FS1): Eric Collins, Robert Smith
- Sources: ESPN box score ESPN team stats

Statistics	West Virginia	Kansas State
First downs	20	15
Total yards	345	299
Rushing yards	77	161
Passing yards	268	138
Turnovers	3	0
Time of possession	26:32	33:28

Team	Category	Player	Statistics
West Virginia	Passing	Jarret Doege	27/45, 268 yards, 2 TD, 2 INT
West Virginia	Rushing	Leddie Brown	20 carries, 85 yards, 0 TD
West Virginia	Receiving	Bryce Ford-Wheaton	5 catches, 67 yards, O TD
Kansas State	Passing	Skylar Thompson	14/19, 138 yards, 1 TD, 0 INT
Kansas State	Rushing	Deuce Vaughn	25 carries, 121 yards, 1 TD
Kansas State	Receiving	Phillip Brooks	5 catches, 62 yards, 0 TD

West Virginia arrived at Kansas State with what was called a "must-win game" but failed to produce the victory. The loss endangered the team's chance for a bowl game appearance for the season. The Mountaineers will need to beat the Kansas Jayhawks and Texas Longhorns to become bowl eligible.

West Virginia's troubles began on the second play of the game, when Kansas State's Russ Yeast grabbed an interception from a pass that bounced off Winston Wright Jr. Later on, Kansas State's Ty Bowman blocked a punt that was picked up by teammate Marvin Martin who ran it in for a special teams touchdown. Kansas State led 17–3 at halftime and held a 24–10 lead at the start of the fourth quarter.

The fourth quarter saw Skylar Thompson convert on 4th-and 8 with a pass to Sammy Wheeler for 35 yards

West Virginia managed an impressive 10-play 68-yard touchdown drive, which included a 4th-down conversion at the Wildcat 12 yard line. The Mountaineers did manage to produce multiple successful fourth-down conversions.

Kansas State's Deuce Vaughn ran for 121 yards and a touchdown, while Skylar Thompson completed just 138 yards passing—but that included a touchdown catch and a "crucial fourth-down grab" to Sammy Wheeler.

Kansas State defeated West Virginia for the first time in six years. Kansas State coach Klieman recognized that when he said, “This is a big-time win because we haven't had a whole lot of success against them.”

=== No. 11 Baylor ===
Team	1	2	3	4	Total
• No. 11 Baylor	7	10	0	3	20
Kansas State	0	7	3	0	10

- Date: November 20
- Location: Manhattan, KS
- Game start: 4:30 p.m.
- Game attendance: 43,857
- Game weather: 56 degrees, wind NE 7mph, Sunny
- Referee: Derek Anderson
- TV announcers (FS1): Aaron Goldsmith, Mark Helfrich
- Sources: K-State Sports ESPN team stats ESPN box score

Scoring summary
1	11:09	BU	Trestan Ebner 6-yard run (Isaiah Hankins kick) (5 plays, 24 yards, 3:45)	BU 7–0
2	4:01	BU	Drake Dabney 2-yard pass from Gerry Bohanon (Isaiah Hankins kick) (15 plays, 74 yards, 7:21)	BU 14–0
2	2:51	KSU	Deuce Vaughn 65-yard run (Chris Tennant kick) (4 plays, 75 yards, 1:10)	BU 14–7
2	0:00	BU	Isaiah Hankins 21-yard field goal (13 plays, 71 yards, 2:51)	BU 17–7
3	8:24	KSU	Chris Tennent 28-yard field goal (9 plays, 43 yards, 3:14)	BU 17–10
4	13:35	BU	Isaiah Hankins 28-yard field goal (13 plays, 72 yards, 5:04)	BU 20–10

Statistics	Baylor	Kansas State
First downs	22	12
Total yards	387	263
Rushing yards	174	105
Passing yards	213	158
Turnovers	1	2
Time of possession	35:54	24:06

Team	Category	Player	Statistics
Baylor	Passing	Blake Shapen	16-21, 137 yards, O TD, 0 INT
Baylor	Rushing	Trestan Ebner	11 carries, 72 yards, 1 TD
Baylor	Receiving	Tyquan Thornton	5 catches, 75 yards, 0 TD
Kansas State	Passing	Skylar Thompson	15–29, 158 yards, 0 TD, 0 INT
Kansas State	Rushing	Deuce Vaughn	11 carries, 129 yards, 1 TD
Kansas State	Receiving	Malik Knowles	1 catch, 48 yards, 0 TD

In the previous week's game, Baylor defeated the then-ranked No. 4 Oklahoma Sooners 27–14.

Baylor took the lead early in the game when they took advantage of a dropped punt and scored. Baylor held the lead for the rest of the game. Kansas State was able to close the lead to seven points but never took the lead. During the game, both teams replaced their starting quarterbacks. The final score was Baylor 20, Kansas State 10.

=== At Texas ===
Team	1	2	3	4	Total
Kansas State	7	10	0	0	17
• Texas	7	9	3	3	22

- Date: November 26
- Location: Darrell K Royal–Texas Memorial Stadium (Austin, TX)
- Game start: 11:00 am
- Game attendance: 75,072
- Game weather: Sunny
- Referee: Kevin Mar
- TV announcers (FOX): Aaron Goldsmith (play-by-play) and Mark Helfrich (color)
- Sources: ESPN box score ESPN team stats

Statistics	Texas	Kansas State
First downs	20	13
Total yards	381	293
Rushing yards	209	228
Passing yards	172	65
Turnovers	1	0
Time of possession	33:30	26:30

Team	Category	Player	Statistics
Texas	Passing	Casey Thompson	17–23, 170 yards, 1 TD, 1 INT
Texas	Rushing	Roschon Johnson	31 carries, 179 yards, 1 TD
Texas	Receiving	Xavier Worthy	6 receptions, 65 yards, 0 TD
Kansas State	Passing	Will Howard	9–13, 65 yards, 0 TD, 0 INT
Kansas State	Rushing	Deuce Vaughn	24 carries, 143 yards, 1 TD
Kansas State	Receiving	Tyrone Howell	1 receptions, 14 yards, 0 TD

Skylar Thompson was absent in the final regular season game for the Wildcats, and the statistics showed a lack of passing game. However, Deuce Vaughn managed to exceed his average yards per game to put on 143 total yards, which puts him the fourth best in the country.

This was the fifth consecutive win for Texas over Kansas State, who had a one-point lead at halftime. Twice Kansas State attempted to convert on 4th and 1--failing both times. With the field goals from Longhorn Cameron Dicker, Texas pulled ahead to win. The final score of the game was Texas 22, Kansas State 17.

Although Texas won the game and broke a six-game losing streak (its worst since 1956), they ended the game at 5 wins and 7 losses (3–6 in the conference) and are not bowl eligible. However, it is possible they could receive an invitation if there are not enough teams with six wins to fill all 82 bowl game openings. Kansas State's regular season record concluded at 7-5 (4–5 in conference) and expect a bowl game invitation on December 5.

=== LSU ===
Team	1	2	3	4	Total
LSU	0	7	0	13	20
• Kansas State	7	14	7	14	42

- Date: January 4, 2022
- Location: NRG Stadium • Houston, TX
- Game start: 8:00 p.m.
- Game attendance: 52,207
- Game weather: None (indoor stadium)
- Referee: John O'Neill (Big Ten)
- TV announcers (ESPN): Tom Hart (play–by–play), Tim Hasselbeck (analyst), and Kelsey Riggs (sideline)
- Sources: ESPN Box Score ESPN Team Stats

Statistics	LSU	Kansas State
First downs	15	22
Total yards	308	442
Rushing yards	170	183
Passing yards	138	259
Turnovers	2	0
Time of possession	27:38	32:22

Team	Category	Player	Statistics
LSU	Passing	Jontre Kirklin	7–11, 138 yards, 3 TD, 2 INT
LSU	Rushing	Jontre Kirklin	11 carries, 61 yards, 0 TD
LSU	Receiving	Chris Hilton Jr.	1 catch, 81 yards, 1 TD
Kansas State	Passing	Skyler Thompson	21–28, 259 yards, 3 TD
Kansas State	Rushing	Deuce Vaughn	21 carries, 146 yards, 3 TD
Kansas State	Receiving	Phillip Brooks III	5 catches, 69 yards

Kansas State and Louisiana State were selected to play in the Texas Bowl on January 4, 2022. Coach Klieman remarked, “I am really proud of our team, especially our seniors, and our staff for their dedication throughout the season and display of our four core values – Discipline, Commitment, Toughness and Be Selfless.”

When the game began, Kansas State scored early and held the lead the entire game. LSU was hampered, having lost its starting quarterback who transferred to Texas A&M and backup quarterback recovering from surgery. LSU had senior receiver Jontre Kirklin move to quarterback. Kirklin had not played as a quarterback since high school in 2016. LSU did not get a first down until late in the second quarter and by that time Kansas State already had a 21–0 lead. The final score was Kansas State 42, LSU 20.

== Rankings ==
Ranking movements Legend: ██ Increase in ranking ██ Decrease in ranking — = Not ranked RV = Received votes
	Week															
Poll	Pre	1	2	3	4	5	6	7	8	9	10	11	12	13	14	Final
AP	—	RV	RV	25	RV	RV	RV	RV	—	—	—	—	RV	—	—	
Coaches	—	RV	RV	RV	RV	—	—	—	—	—	—	—	RV	—	—	
CFP	Not released									—	—	—	—	—	—	Not released

== Statistics ==
=== Scoring ===
==== Scores by quarter ====
	1	2	3	4	Total
All opponents	0	0	0	0	0
Kansas State	0	0	0	0	0

== Coaching staff ==
Name	Position	Year at Kansas State	Previous job
Chris Klieman	Head coach	3rd	North Dakota State (HC)
Joe Klanderman	DC/S	3rd	North Dakota State (DB)
Courtney Messingham	OC/WR	3rd	North Dakota State (OC/RB)
Van Malone	AHC/PGC/CB	3rd	Mississippi State (DA)
Brian Anderson	RB	3rd	Illinois State (WR)
Collin Klein	QB	6th	Northern Iowa (QB)
Jason Ray	FB/TE	3rd	North Dakota State (WR)
Conor Riley	OL	3rd	North Dakota State (OL)
Steve Stanard	LB	2nd	Syracuse University (DE)
Mike Tuiasosopo	DT	3rd	UTEP (DL)
Buddy Wyatt	DE	3rd	Kansas (senior analyst)
Trumain Carroll	Strength/Cond.	1st	South Florida (S&C)

== Players drafted into the NFL ==
Round	Pick	Player	Position	NFL Club
7	247	Skylar Thompson	QB	Miami Dolphins
7	253	Russ Yeast	DB	Los Angeles Rams
