= Jontre Kirklin =

American football player (born 1998)

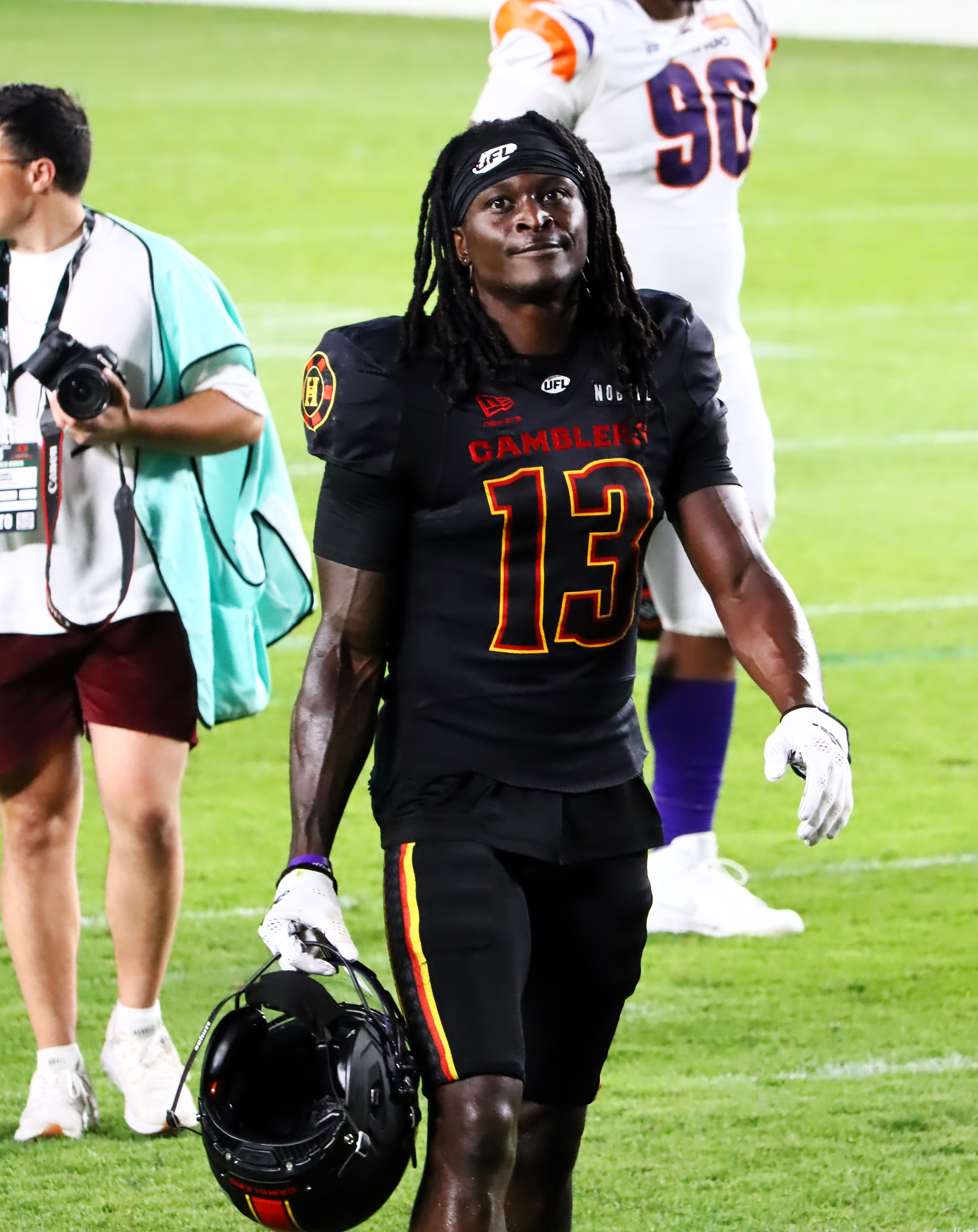
- Kirklin with the Houston Gamblers in 2026

No. 13 – Dallas Renegades
- Position: Wide receiver
- Roster status: Active

Personal information
- Born: October 9, 1998 (age 28); Lutcher, Louisiana, U.S.
- Listed height: 6 ft 0 in (1.83 m)
- Listed weight: 182 lb (83 kg)

Career information
- High school: Lutcher (LA)
- College: LSU (2017–2021)
- NFL draft: 2022: undrafted

Career history
- Arizona Cardinals (2022)*; Houston Roughnecks (2023); New Orleans Saints (2023)*; San Antonio Brahmas (2024); San Francisco 49ers (2024)*; San Antonio Brahmas (2025); Houston Gamblers (2026); Dallas Renegades (2027–present)
- * Offseason or practice squad member only

Awards and highlights
- CFP national champion (2019); UFL reception co-leader (2024)
- Stats at Pro Football Reference

Jontre Kirklin (born October 9, 1998) is an American professional football wide receiver for the Dallas Renegades of the United Football League (UFL). He played college football for the LSU Tigers.

== College career ==
Kirklin played for the LSU Tigers from 2017 until 2021. Coming out of high school, Kirklin switched positions from quarterback to defensive back. He played in 12 games his freshman year. In 2018, Kirklin played in 12 games at both wide receiver and defensive back. In 2019, he played in 14 games catching 2 passes for 75 yards where he was a part of the 2020 College Football Playoff National Championship team. In 2020, he played in 10 games while recording over 13 catches for 184 receiving yards and three touchdowns. In 2021, Kirklin played and appeared in 9 games playing both quarterback and wide receiver.

On January 5, 2022, Kirklin started at quarterback for the 2022 Texas Bowl against the Kansas State Wildcats where they lost 42–20. He finished the season with 4 catches for 49 yards, and completed 7 of 11 passes for 138 yards and 3 passing touchdowns while rushing for 61 yards.

== Professional career ==
Pre-draft measurables
Height	Weight	Arm length	Hand span	Wingspan	40-yard dash	10-yard split	20-yard split	20-yard shuttle	Three-cone drill	Vertical jump	Broad jump	Bench press
5 ft 11 5/8 in (1.82 m)	184 lb (83 kg)	30 5/8 in (0.78 m)	9 3/8 in (0.24 m)	6 ft 2 3/8 in (1.89 m)	4.55 s	1.59 s	2.64 s	4.30 s	7.07 s	42.0 in (1.07 m)	11 ft 6 in (3.51 m)	10 reps
All values from Pro Day

=== Arizona Cardinals ===
After going undrafted in the 2022 NFL draft, Kirklin signed with the Arizona Cardinals on May 6, 2022. He was released on August 31, 2022, but was re-signed to their practice squad. He was released on September 6, 2022.

=== Houston Roughnecks ===
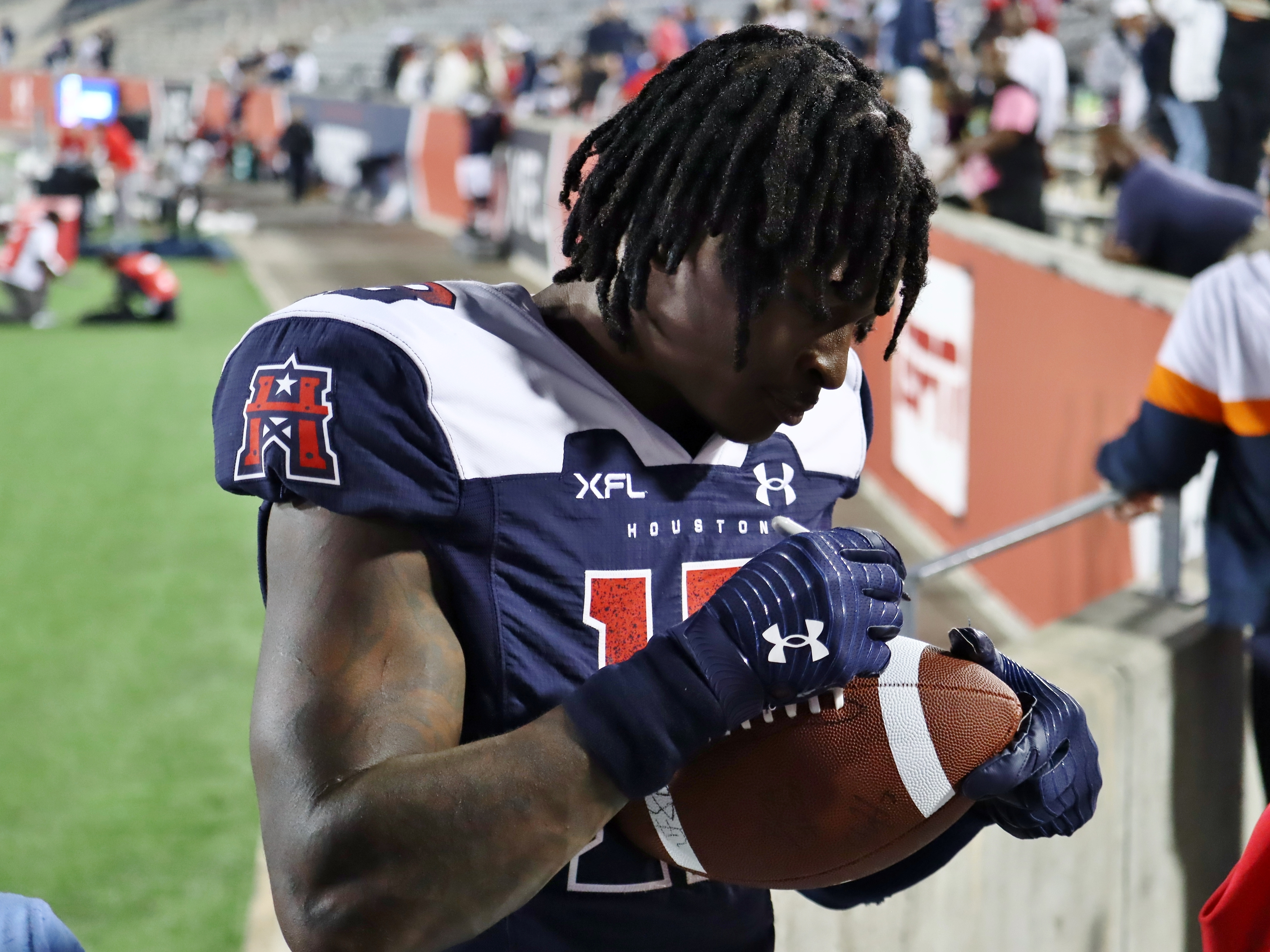
Kirklin with the Houston Roughnecks signing a football in 2023

On November 16, 2022, Kirklin was drafted by the Houston Roughnecks of the XFL. After a chest injury in Week 5, Kirklin would miss the rest of the 2023 XFL season. He finished the season playing in 4 full games, recording over 15 receptions for 253 yards and 4 touchdowns while averaging over 16.9 yards per catch.

=== New Orleans Saints ===
On August 5, 2023, Kirklin signed with the New Orleans Saints. He was released on August 30, 2023, but was re-signed to the practice squad. He was released again on September 12, 2023, but was re-signed to the practice squad on October 11, 2023 Kirklin was released again on January 2, 2024.

=== San Antonio Brahmas ===
On January 19, 2024, Kirklin signed with the San Antonio Brahmas of the United Football League (UFL).

=== San Francisco 49ers ===
Kirklin signed with the San Francisco 49ers on August 7, 2024. He was waived on August 26, 2024.

=== San Antonio Brahmas (second stint) ===
On September 16, 2024, Kirklin re-signed with the Brahmas.

=== Houston Gamblers ===
On January 12, 2026, Kirklin signed with the Houston Gamblers of the United Football League (UFL).
