= Southern University Laboratory School =

K-12 laboratory school in Baton Rouge, Louisiana

Location
- 129 Swan Ave. Baton Rouge, (East Baton Rouge), Louisiana 70813; United States; 30°31′29″N 91°11′24″W

Information
- Type: Public
- Established: 1922
- Teaching staff: 34.22 (FTE)
- Enrollment: 479 (2023–2024)
- Student to teacher ratio: 14.00
- Colors: Green, white and gold
- Athletics conference: LHSAA
- Mascot: Kittens
- Website: https://sulabschool.com/

Southern University Laboratory School (Southern Lab or SULAB or SULS) is a K-12 laboratory school in Baton Rouge, Louisiana, affiliated with Southern University.

== History ==
It was established in 1922. The founding of a University-based school was the realization of Dr. J.S. Clark’s dream that a strong training school should be established to provide a training ground for Southern University students enrolled in the teacher preparation program. It countered the constraints of racial segregation in Louisiana and expanded employment opportunities for Southern University students majoring in education. Under racial segregation, Southern University students majoring in education were not allowed to gain practical teaching experience, as Student Teachers, in East Baton Rouge Parish. Practical teaching experience and passing the teaching examination were required to teach in any East Baton Rouge Parish school, black or white.

The earliest school was called the Southern University Model Training School. In the early 1930s the name was changed to Southern University Demonstration School. A few years later, the school was renamed the Southern University Laboratory School. The Laboratory School was first accredited by the Southern Association of Colleges and Schools in 1936. From its beginning in 1922 until the present time, a major objective of the Laboratory School has been to participate in the preparation of teachers, while providing an elementary and secondary education for college-bound students.

The school's focus on academics and its close relationship with the University allowed it to offer advanced studies, as well as a full range of extracurricular activities in academics, arts and music. In some instances, students were allowed to take university classes. The Laboratory School has graduated more than 5,000 students. Its graduates are found in the ranks of doctors, dentists, psychologists, psychiatrists, lawyers, engineers, journalists, newscasters, artists, filmmakers, athletes, university administrators, military officers, entrepreneurs, educators, corporate executives, religious leaders and other professionals.

In 2010, it had a low population count at 266 after a decline in enrollment, and the school had incurred debts. In August 2013, the school established the "Mini Lab" program in which university professors gave instructional sessions to the K-12 SULS students. By 2014, SULS campus enrollment had recovered and was now at fewer than 500.

In 2013, SULS started an online school; the intention was to have around 200 students. In 2014, the online program had 600 students with fewer than 400 on a waiting list.

== Athletics ==
Southern University Lab athletics competes in the LHSAA.

=== Championships ===
Football Championships

- (13) State Championships: 1941, 1947, 1949, 1965, 1968, 1980, 1982, 1986, 1996, 2015, 2016, 2021, 2023

Boys Basketball Championships

- (16) State Championships: 1971, 1972, 1973, 1987, 1993, 1994, 1995, 1996, 1997, 1999, 2000, 2001, 2003, 2004, 2005, 2022

== Notable alumni ==
- Frank Alexander, NFL player
- Christopher Allen, NFL player
- Damone Clark, NFL player
- Tyrion Davis-Price, NFL player
- Chad Jones, NFL player
- Ronald Leary, NFL player
- Dave Mays, NFL player
- George McGee, NFL player
- Taurean Nixon, NFL player
- Bobby Phills, NBA player
- Tracy Porter, NFL player
- John Simon, NFL player
- Marcus Spears, NFL player and ESPN personality
- Chuck Wiley, NFL player

== See also ==
- Southern University System
