= Jaray Jenkins =

American football player (born 2000)

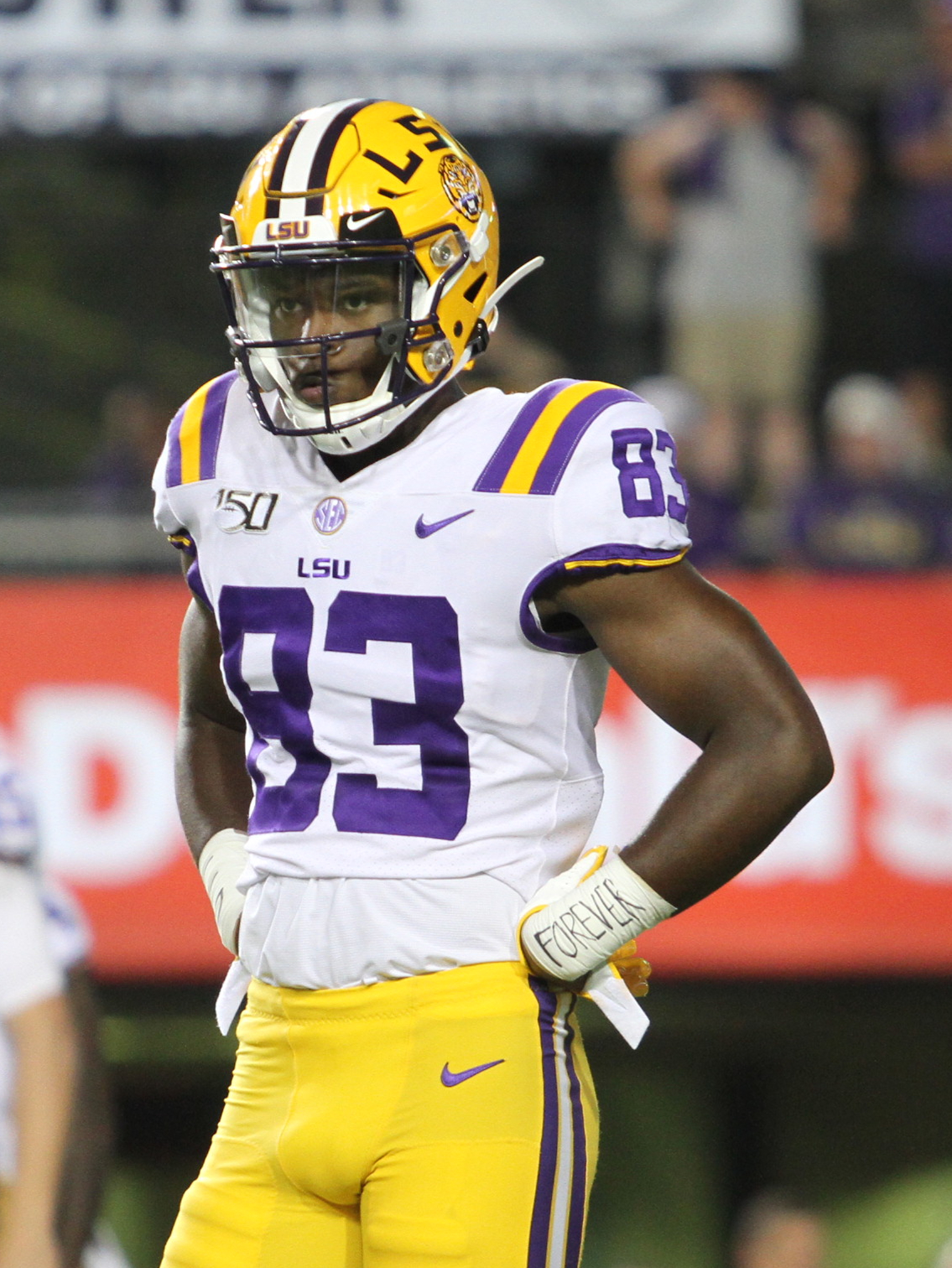
- Jenkins with LSU in 2019

Profile
- Position: Wide receiver

Personal information
- Born: January 4, 2000 (age 26); Jena, Louisiana, U.S.
- Listed height: 6 ft 2 in (1.88 m)
- Listed weight: 206 lb (93 kg)

Career information
- High school: Jena (LA)
- College: LSU (2019–2022)
- NFL draft: 2023: undrafted

Career history
- Jacksonville Jaguars (2023)*; Pittsburgh Steelers (2024)*
- * Offseason or practice squad member only
- Stats at Pro Football Reference

Jaray Jenkins (born January 4, 2000) is an American professional football wide receiver. He played college football at LSU.

== Early life ==
Jenkins grew up in Jena, Louisiana and attended Jena High School. In his high school career, he pulled in 111 passes, going for 1,960 yards, and 27 touchdowns. On the ground he added 448 rushing yards and 9 rushing touchdowns. However, in his senior season he would fracture his tibia and miss his senior season. On March 13, 2017, Jenkins committed to play college football at Louisiana State University.

== College career ==
In four years with the Tigers, Jenkins collected 89 catches for 1,370 yards, and 14 touchdowns. 2021 was his best season where, posting 34 receptions for 502 yards, and six touchdowns. On November 27, 2021, Jenkins had a career night in which he brought in 8 passes for 169 yards and two touchdowns including the game winning score with 20 seconds left, to help the Tigers upset #15 Texas A&M in Ed Orgeron's final home game.

On December 12, 2022, Jenkins declared for the 2023 NFL draft.

== Professional career ==
Pre-draft measurables
Height	Weight	Arm length	Hand span	40-yard dash	10-yard split	20-yard split	20-yard shuttle	Three-cone drill	Vertical jump	Broad jump	Bench press
6 ft 1 5/8 in (1.87 m)	204 lb (93 kg)	31 3/4 in (0.81 m)	10 in (0.25 m)	4.60 s	1.56 s	2.65 s	4.52 s	7.38 s	30.5 in (0.77 m)	9 ft 8 in (2.95 m)	20 reps

=== Jacksonville Jaguars ===
After not being selected in the 2023 NFL draft, Jenkins signed with the Jacksonville Jaguars as an undrafted free agent. He was waived/injured on August 29, 2023 and placed on injured reserve. He was released on September 4.

=== Pittsburgh Steelers ===
On June 3, 2024, Jenkins signed with the Pittsburgh Steelers. He was waived on August 27, and later re-signed to the practice squad. He was released on October 14.
