= Tyrion Davis-Price =

American football player (born 2000)

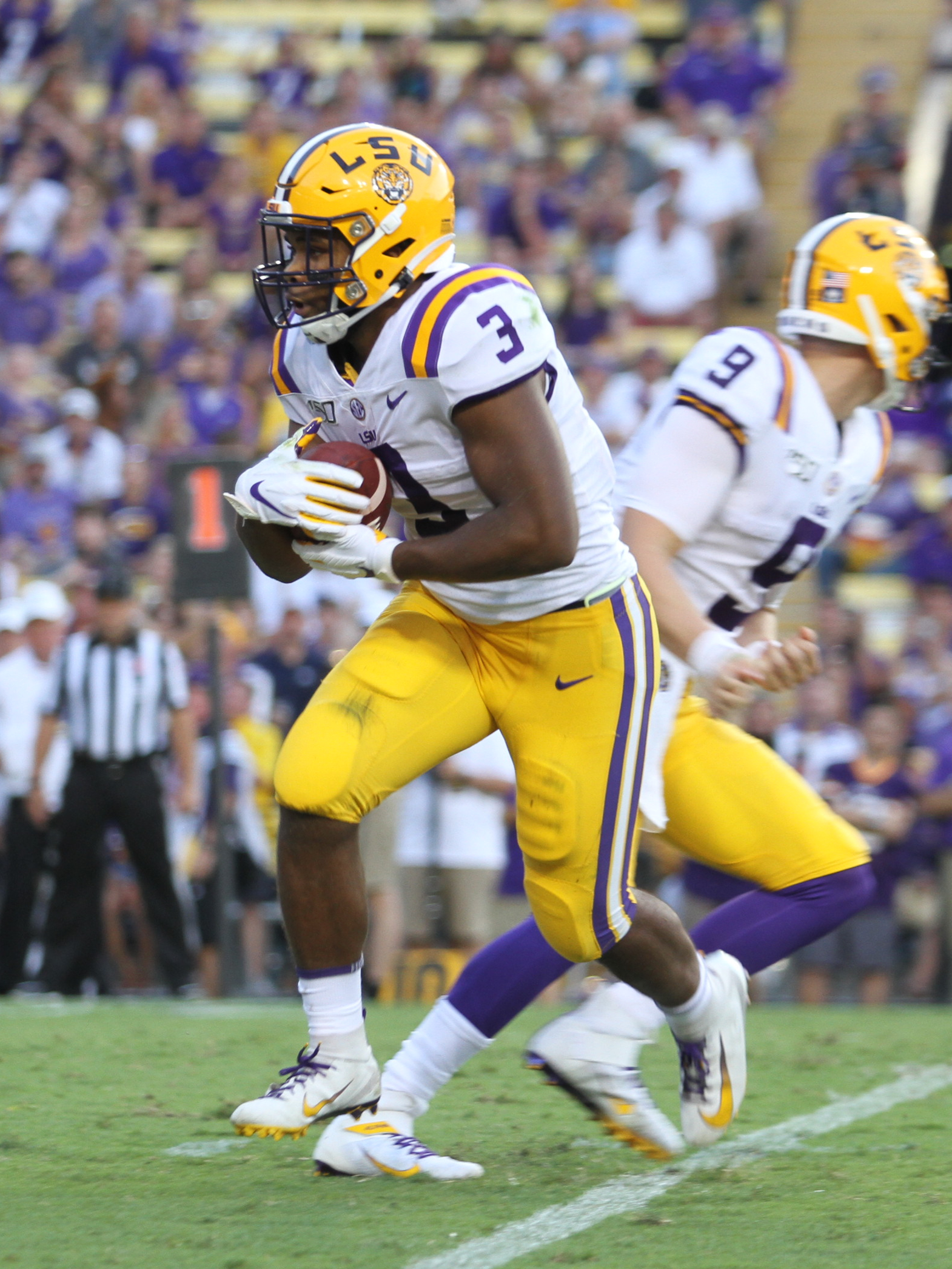
- Davis-Price with the LSU Tigers in 2019

No. 9 – Rhode Island Breakers
- Position: Running back
- Roster status: Active

Personal information
- Born: October 23, 2000 (age 26); Baton Rouge, Louisiana, U.S.
- Listed height: 6 ft 0 in (1.83 m)
- Listed weight: 219 lb (99 kg)

Career information
- High school: Southern University Laboratory School (Baton Rouge)
- College: LSU (2019–2021)
- NFL draft: 2022: 3rd round, 93rd overall pick

Career history
- San Francisco 49ers (2022–2023); Philadelphia Eagles (2024); Tennessee Titans (2025)*; Green Bay Packers (2025)*; Birmingham Stallions (2026); Rhode Island Breakers (2027–present)
- * Offseason or practice squad member only

Awards and highlights
- Super Bowl champion (LIX); CFP national champion (2019)

Career NFL statistics
- Rushing yards: 127
- Rushing average: 3.0
- Stats at Pro Football Reference

Tyrion Jacobe Davis-Price (born October 23, 2000) is an American professional football running back for the Rhode Island Breakers of the United Football League (UFL). He played college football for the LSU Tigers and was selected by the San Francisco 49ers in the third round of the 2022 NFL draft.

== Early life ==
Davis-Price grew up in Baton Rouge, Louisiana, and attended Southern University Laboratory School. As a senior, he rushed for over 2,500 yards and scored 29 touchdowns. Davis-Price committed to play college football at LSU.

== College career ==
Davis-Price rushed 64 times for 295 yards and six touchdowns during his true freshman season as LSU won the 2020 College Football Playoff National Championship. He was the Tigers' leading rusher with 446 yards and three touchdowns on 104 carries in 2020. As a junior, Davis-Price rushed 211 times for 1,003 yards and six touchdowns. Against 20th-ranked Florida, he rushed for a school-record 287 yards in a 49–42 win. Following the end of the season, Davis-Price declared that he would be entering the 2022 NFL draft.

== Professional career ==
Pre-draft measurables
Height	Weight	Arm length	Hand span	Wingspan	40-yard dash	10-yard split	20-yard split	20-yard shuttle	Three-cone drill	Vertical jump	Broad jump	Bench press
6 ft 0 3/8 in (1.84 m)	211 lb (96 kg)	30 3/4 in (0.78 m)	9 1/4 in (0.23 m)	6 ft 3 5/8 in (1.92 m)	4.48 s	1.53 s	2.60 s	4.40 s	7.25 s	35.5 in (0.90 m)	9 ft 10 in (3.00 m)	18 reps
All values from NFL Combine/Pro Day

=== San Francisco 49ers ===
Davis-Price was selected in the third round of the 2022 NFL draft with the 93rd overall pick by the San Francisco 49ers. He made his NFL debut in Week 2 against the Seattle Seahawks and had 14 carries for 33 yards in the 27–7 victory. He played in six games and recorded 34 carries for 99 rushing yards in his rookie season.

The 49ers waived Davis-Price on December 6, 2023 and re-signed him to the practice squad the following day.

=== Philadelphia Eagles ===
On February 20, 2024, Davis-Price signed with the Philadelphia Eagles. He was waived on August 27, and re-signed to the practice squad. On December 28, Davis-Price was elevated to the team's active roster for their Week 17 matchup against the Dallas Cowboys. He won a Super Bowl championship when the Eagles defeated the Kansas City Chiefs 40–22 in Super Bowl LIX. He signed a reserve/future contract on February 14, 2025.

On May 4, 2025, Davis-Price was waived by the Eagles.

=== Tennessee Titans ===
On June 2, 2025, Davis-Price signed with the Tennessee Titans. He was waived on July 17.

=== Green Bay Packers ===
On August 12, 2025, Davis-Price signed with the Green Bay Packers. He was released on August 26 as part of final roster cuts.

=== Birmingham Stallions ===
On October 1, 2025, Davis-Price signed with the Birmingham Stallions of the United Football League (UFL).
