= 2021 Oklahoma Sooners football team =

American college football season

2021 Oklahoma Sooners football

Alamo Bowl champion

Alamo Bowl, W 47–32 vs. Oregon
- Conference: Big 12 Conference

Ranking
- Coaches: No. 10
- AP: No. 10
- Record: 11–2 (7–2 Big 12)
- Head coach: Lincoln Riley (5th season; regular season); Bob Stoops (interim; bowl game)
- Co-offensive coordinators: Cale Gundy (5th season); Bill Bedenbaugh (5th season)
- Offensive scheme: Air raid
- Defensive coordinator: Alex Grinch (3rd season)
- Base defense: 3–4
- Home stadium: Gaylord Family Oklahoma Memorial Stadium

2021 Big 12 Conference football standings
	Conf.			Overall
Team	W		L	W		L
No. 7 Oklahoma State y	8	–	1	12	–	2
No. 5 Baylor y$	7	–	2	12	–	2
No. 10 Oklahoma	7	–	2	11	–	2
Iowa State	5	–	4	7	–	6
Kansas State	4	–	5	8	–	5
West Virginia	4	–	5	6	–	7
Texas	3	–	6	5	–	7
TCU	3	–	6	5	–	7
Texas Tech	3	–	6	7	–	6
Kansas	1	–	8	2	–	10
Championship: Baylor 21, Oklahoma State 16
$ – Conference champion; y – Championship game participant; Rankings from AP Poll

The 2021 Oklahoma Sooners football team represented the University of Oklahoma during the 2021 NCAA Division I FBS football season, the 127th season for the Oklahoma Sooners. They played their home games at Gaylord Family Oklahoma Memorial Stadium in Norman, Oklahoma. They are a charter member of the Big 12 Conference. The team was led during the regular season by Lincoln Riley, in his fifth and final year as head coach.

Riley departed Oklahoma for USC on November 28. Former Sooners head coach Bob Stoops was named the interim head coach and led the team to their win in the Alamo Bowl.

== Offseason ==
=== Position key ===
Back	B	Center	C	Cornerback	CB	Defensive back	DB
Defensive end	DE	Defensive lineman	DL	Defensive tackle	DT	End	E
Fullback	FB	Guard	G	Halfback	HB	Kicker	K
Kickoff returner	KR	Offensive tackle	OT	Offensive lineman	OL	Linebacker	LB
Long snapper	LS	Punter	P	Punt returner	PR	Quarterback	QB
Running back	RB	Safety	S	Tight end	TE	Wide receiver	WR

=== Offseason departures ===
2021 Oklahoma offseason departures
Name	Number	Pos.	Height	Weight	Year	Hometown	Notes
Creed Humphrey	56	C	6’5	312	RS Junior	Shawnee, Oklahoma	Declared for NFL Draft
Ronnie Perkins	7	DE	6’3	247	Junior	St. Louis, Missouri	Declared for NFL Draft
Tre Norwood	13	CB	6'0	194	RS Junior	Fort Smith, Arkansas	Declared for NFL Draft
Rhamondre Stevenson	29	RB	6’0	245	Senior	Las Vegas, Nevada	Graduated/Declared for NFL Draft
Tre Brown	6	CB	5'10	188	Senior	Tulsa, Oklahoma	Graduated/Declared for NFL Draft
Chanse Sylivie	28	CB	6’0	196	Senior	Shreveport, Louisiana	Graduated
Josh Schenk	36	LB	5’11	226	RS Senior	Knightdale, North Carolina	Graduated
Stephen Johnson	39	PK	6'1	186	RS Senior	Arlington, Texas	Graduated
Obi Obailo	82	WR	6’3	218	RS Senior	Coppell, Texas	Graduated

=== Recruiting ===
College recruiting (2021)
Name	Hometown	School	Height	Weight	Commit date
Caleb Williams; QB	Washington, D.C.	Gonzaga College High School	6 ft 2 in (1.88 m)	210 lb (95 kg)	Jul 4, 2020
Caleb Williams; QB	Recruit ratings: Rivals: 247Sports: ESPN: (89)				
Mario Williams; WR	Plant City, Florida	Plant City High School	5 ft 10 in (1.78 m)	165 lb (75 kg)	May 15, 2020
Mario Williams; WR	Recruit ratings: Rivals: 247Sports: ESPN: (89)				
Savion Byrd; OT	Duncanville, Texas	Duncanville High School	6 ft 5 in (1.96 m)	265 lb (120 kg)	Dec 16, 2020
Savion Byrd; OT	Recruit ratings: Rivals: 247Sports: ESPN: (87)				
Billy Bowman Jr. WR	Denton, Texas	Billy Ryan High School	5 ft 10 in (1.78 m)	175 lb (79 kg)	Nov 1, 2020
Billy Bowman Jr. WR	Recruit ratings: Rivals: 247Sports: ESPN: (85)				
Clayton Smith; LB	Texarkana, Texas	Texas High School	6 ft 4 in (1.93 m)	215 lb (98 kg)	May 15, 2020
Clayton Smith; LB	Recruit ratings: Rivals: 247Sports: ESPN: (85)				
Jalil Farooq; WR	Upper Marlboro, Maryland	Dr. Henry A. Wise Jr. High School	6 ft 1 in (1.85 m)	190 lb (86 kg)	Sep 27, 2020
Jalil Farooq; WR	Recruit ratings: Rivals: 247Sports: ESPN: (84)				
Cody Jackson; WR	Richmond, Texas	Foster High School	6 ft 0 in (1.83 m)	175 lb (79 kg)	Apr 14, 2019
Cody Jackson; WR	Recruit ratings: Rivals: 247Sports: ESPN: (84)				
Ethan Downs; ATH	Weatherford, Oklahoma	Weatherford High School	6 ft 4 in (1.93 m)	240 lb (110 kg)	Oct 9, 2019
Ethan Downs; ATH	Recruit ratings: Rivals: 247Sports: ESPN: (83)				
Kelvin Gilliam Jr. DE	Highland Springs, Virginia	Highland Springs High School	6 ft 3 in (1.91 m)	255 lb (116 kg)	Aug 22, 2020
Kelvin Gilliam Jr. DE	Recruit ratings: Rivals: 247Sports: ESPN: (83)				
Latrell McCutchin; CB	Austin, Texas	LBJ High School	6 ft 1 in (1.85 m)	175 lb (79 kg)	Jul 4, 2020
Latrell McCutchin; CB	Recruit ratings: Rivals: 247Sports: ESPN: (80)				
Cullen Montgomery; OT	Bellaire, Texas	Episcopal High School	6 ft 5 in (1.96 m)	290 lb (130 kg)	Jan 19, 2020
Cullen Montgomery; OT	Recruit ratings: Rivals: 247Sports: ESPN: (79)				
Jordan Mukes; CB	Choctaw, Oklahoma	Choctaw High School	6 ft 4 in (1.93 m)	190 lb (86 kg)	Mar 30, 2020
Jordan Mukes; CB	Recruit ratings: Rivals: 247Sports: ESPN: (79)				
Damond Harmon; CB	Highland Springs, Virginia	Highland Springs High School	6 ft 1 in (1.85 m)	180 lb (82 kg)	Aug 1, 2020
Damond Harmon; CB	Recruit ratings: Rivals: 247Sports: ESPN: (78)				
Nathan Rawlins-Kibonge; DE	Portland, Oregon	Jefferson High School	6 ft 7 in (2.01 m)	240 lb (110 kg)	Jun 17, 2020
Nathan Rawlins-Kibonge; DE	Recruit ratings: Rivals: 247Sports: ESPN: (78)				
Danny Stutsman; ATH	Winter Garden, Florida	Foundation Academy	6 ft 2 in (1.88 m)	215 lb (98 kg)	May 4, 2020
Danny Stutsman; ATH	Recruit ratings: Rivals: 247Sports: ESPN: (78)				
Isaiah Coe; DT	Flossmoor, Illinois	Iowa Western Community College (JC)	6 ft 2 in (1.88 m)	300 lb (140 kg)	Jun 5, 2020
Isaiah Coe; DT	Recruit ratings: Rivals: 247Sports: ESPN: (78)				
Overall recruit ranking:
Note: In many cases, Scout, Rivals, 247Sports, On3, and ESPN may conflict in their listings of height and weight.; In these cases, the average was taken. ESPN grades are on a 100-point scale.; Sources: "Rivals commits". Rivals.; "ESPN commits". ESPN.; "2021 Team Ranking". Rivals.com.; "247Sports commits". 247Sports.

=== Transfers ===
Outgoing

The Oklahoma Sooners lost seventeen players via transfer portal for the 2021 season.

Name	No.	Pos.	Height	Weight	Year	Hometown	New school
Seth McGowan	#1	RB	5 ft 11 in (1.80 m)	211 pounds (96 kg)	Freshman	Dallas, Texas	Butler CC
Theo Howard	#2	WR	6 ft 0 in (1.83 m)	182 pounds (83 kg)	RS Senior	Westlake Village, California	Utah
Chandler Morris	#4	QB	5 ft 11 in (1.80 m)	175 pounds (79 kg)	Freshman	Highland Park, Texas	TCU
T.J. Pledger	#5	RB	5 ft 9 in (1.75 m)	193 pounds (88 kg)	Junior	Pacoima, California	Utah
Charleston Rambo	#14	WR	6 ft 1 in (1.85 m)	175 pounds (79 kg)	RS Junior	Cedar Hill, Texas	Miami
Tanner Mordecai	#15	QB	6 ft 2 in (1.88 m)	211 pounds (96 kg)	RS Sophomore	Waco, Texas	SMU
Robert Barnes	#20	LB	6 ft 2 in (1.88 m)	232 pounds (105 kg)	RS Junior	Southlake, Texas	Colorado
Eric Gallegos	#34	DB	5 ft 9 in (1.75 m)	175 pounds (79 kg)	RS Sophomore	Frisco, Texas	TBD
Jon-Michael Terry	#40	LB	6 ft 3 in (1.91 m)	245 pounds (111 kg)	Senior	Tulsa, Oklahoma	Tulsa
Brendan Radley-Hiles	#44	DB	5 ft 9 in (1.75 m)	189 pounds (86 kg)	Junior	Inglewood, California	Washington
Dane Saltarelli	#49	TE	6 ft 3 in (1.91 m)	255 pounds (116 kg)	RS Sophomore	Belleair Bluffs, Florida	Western Kentucky
Stacey Wilkins	#72	OL	6 ft 6 in (1.98 m)	316 pounds (143 kg)	RS Freshman	Camden, Arkansas	Louisiana-Monroe
E.J. Ndoma–Ogar	#75	OL	6 ft 3 in (1.91 m)	333 pounds (151 kg)	RS Freshman	Allen, Texas	Missouri
Jalin Conyers	#80	TE	6 ft 4 in (1.93 m)	228 pounds (103 kg)	Freshman	Gruver, Texas	Arizona State
Grant Calcaterra	#80	TE	6 ft 5 in (1.96 m)	247 pounds (112 kg)	Junior	Rancho Santa Margarita, California	SMU
Kyre Richardson	#84	WR	6 ft 2 in (1.88 m)	180 pounds (82 kg)	Freshman	Tulsa, OK	TBD
Zacchaeus McKinney	#98	DL	6 ft 3 in (1.91 m)	272 pounds (123 kg)	RS Junior	Weatherford, Texas	Hawaii

Incoming

The Oklahoma Sooners add nine players via transfer portal from the 2020 season.

Name	No.	Pos.	Height	Weight	Year	Hometown	Prev. school
Eric Gray	#0	RB	5 ft 9 in (1.75 m)	205 pounds (93 kg)	Junior	Memphis, Tennessee	Tennessee
Kevontre Bradford	#2	RB	5 ft 11 in (1.80 m)	190 pounds (86 kg)	Junior	Dallas, Texas	LSU
Micah Bowens	#5	QB	5 ft 11 in (1.80 m)	190 pounds (86 kg)	Freshman	Las Vegas, Nevada	Penn State
Michael Woods II	#8	WR	6 ft 1 in (1.85 m)	196 pounds (89 kg)	Junior	Magnolia, Texas	Arkansas
Key Lawrence	#12	DB	6 ft 1 in (1.85 m)	200 pounds (91 kg)	Freshman	Nashville, Tennessee	Tennessee
Josh Plaster	#36	P/K	6 ft 0 in (1.83 m)	176 pounds (80 kg)	RS Freshman	Flower Mound, Texas	Arizona State
Wanya Morris	#64	OL	6 ft 5 in (1.96 m)	320 pounds (150 kg)	Sophomore	Grayson, Georgia	Tennessee
Robert Congel	#66	OL	6 ft 10 in (2.08 m)	310 pounds (140 kg)	Junior	Greenwood Village, Colorado	Arizona
Michael Turk	#37	P	5 ft 11 in (1.80 m)	230 pounds (100 kg)	RS Junior	Dallas, Texas	Arizona State

=== Returning starters ===
Offense

Player	Class	Position
Spencer Rattler	RS Sophomore	Quarterback
Jeremiah Hall	RS Senior	Running back
Marvin Mims	Sophomore	Wide receiver
Austin Stogner	Junior	Tight end

Defense

Player	Class	Position
Perrion Winfrey	Senior	Defensive end
Caleb Kelly	Grad Student	Linebacker
Caleb Murphy	Junior	Defensive back

Special teams

Player	Class	Position
Gabe Brkic	RS Junior	Placekicker
Reeves Mundschau	RS Senior	Punter/Holder
Kasey Kelleher	RS Sr.	Long Snapper
Marvin Mims	Sophomore	Kickoff/Punt Returner

† Indicates player was a starter in 2020 but missed all of 2021 due to injury.

=== 2021 NFL draft ===
==== NFL Combine ====
The official list of participants for the 2021 NFL Combine included Oklahoma football players: -

==== Team players drafted into the NFL ====
Round	Pick	Player	Position	NFL Club
2	63	Creed Humphrey	C	Kansas City Chiefs
3	96	Ronnie Perkins	DE	New England Patriots
4	120	Rhamondre Stevenson	RB	New England Patriots
4	137	Tre Brown	CB	Seattle Seahawks

== Preseason ==
=== Award watch lists ===
Listed in the order that they were released

Award	Player	Position	Year
Dodd Trophy	Lincoln Riley	HC	--
Maxwell Award	Spencer Rattler	QB	RS So.
Maxwell Award	Marvin Mims	WR	So.
Bednarik Award	Nik Bonitto	LB	Jr.
Bednarik Award	Isaiah Thomas	DE	Sr.
Davey O'Brien Award	Spencer Rattler	QB	RS So.
Doak Walker Award	Eric Gray	RB	Jr.
Fred Biletnikoff Award	Marvin Mims	WR	So.
Fred Biletnikoff Award	Michael Woods II	WR	Sr.
John Mackey Award	Austin Stogner	TE	Jr.
Butkus Award	Nik Bonitto	LB	RS Jr.
Butkus Award	Brian Asamoah II	LB	RS Jr.
Outland Trophy	Marquis Hayes	OL	RS Sr.
Outland Trophy	Tyrese Robinson	OL	RS Sr.
Outland Trophy	Perrion Winfrey	DL	Sr.
Bronko Nagurski Trophy	Isaiah Thomas	DE	Sr.
Bronko Nagurski Trophy	Perrion Winfrey	DL	Sr.
Lou Groza Award	Gabe Brkic	K	RS Jr.
Paul Hornung Award	Marvin Mims	WR	So.
Wuerffel Trophy	Pat Fields	DB	Sr.
Walter Camp Award	Spencer Rattler	QB	RS So.
Manning Award	Spencer Rattler	QB	RS So.
Earl Campbell Tyler Rose Award	Kennedy Brooks	RB	RS Jr.
Ray Guy Award	Michael Turk	P	RS Jr.

=== Big 12 media poll ===
Big 12 media poll
Predicted finish	Team	Votes (1st place)
1	Oklahoma	365 (35)
2	Iowa State	351 (4)
3	Texas	273
4	Oklahoma State	266
5	TCU	255
6	West Virginia	185
7	Kansas State	163
8	Baylor	124
9	Texas Tech	103
10	Kansas	39

=== Preseason awards ===
2021 Preseason All-Big 12

- Offensive player of the year: Spencer Rattler, QB, Oklahoma
- Newcomer of the Year: Eric Gray, RB, Oklahoma

All-Big 12 Offense
Position	Player	Class	Team
QB	Spencer Rattler	RS So.	Oklahoma
FB	Jeremiah Hall	Sr.	Oklahoma
WR	Marvin Mims	So.	Oklahoma
OL	Marquis Hayes	Sr.	Oklahoma
OL	Wanya Morris	Jr.	Oklahoma
PK	Gabe Brkic	Jr.	Oklahoma

All-Big 12 Defense
Position	Player	Class	Team
DL	Isaiah Thomas	Sr.	Oklahoma
DL	Perrion Winfrey	Sr.	Oklahoma
LB	Nik Bonitto	Jr.	Oklahoma

== Schedule ==
=== Regular season ===
The 2021 schedule consisted of 7 home games, 4 away games and 1 neutral-site game in the regular season. The Sooners hosted 2 non-conference games against Western Carolina and Nebraska and was originally scheduled to travel to Tulane, but the effects of Hurricane Ida forced the game to be played in Oklahoma with Tulane still being the home team. Oklahoma hosted Iowa State, TCU, Texas Tech, and West Virginia, and traveled to Baylor, Kansas, Kansas State, and Oklahoma State in regular-season conference play. Oklahoma played Texas in Dallas, Texas at the Cotton Bowl Stadium in the Red River Showdown, the 116th game played in the series.

Date	Time	Opponent	Rank	Site	TV	Result	Attendance
September 4	11:00 a.m.	at Tulane*	No. 2	Gaylord Family Oklahoma Memorial Stadium; Norman, OK (Note: Originally scheduled to be played as an away game, the game against Tulane was moved to Norman on August 30, 2021, due to safety concerns related to Hurricane Ida. Tulane remained the designated home team despite Oklahoma hosting the game.)	ABC	W 40–35	42,206
September 11	6:00 p.m.	Western Carolina*	No. 4	Gaylord Family Oklahoma Memorial Stadium; Norman, OK	BSOK PPV	W 76–0	83,538
September 18	11:00 a.m.	Nebraska*	No. 3	Gaylord Family Oklahoma Memorial Stadium; Norman, OK (rivalry, Big Noon Kickoff)	FOX	W 23–16	84,659
September 25	6:30 p.m.	West Virginia	No. 4	Gaylord Family Oklahoma Memorial Stadium; Norman, OK	ABC	W 16–13	84,353
October 2	2:30 p.m.	at Kansas State	No. 6	Bill Snyder Family Stadium; Manhattan, KS	FOX	W 37–31	47,690
October 9	11:00 a.m.	vs. No. 21 Texas	No. 6	Cotton Bowl; Dallas, TX (Red River Showdown, College GameDay)	ABC	W 55–48	92,100
October 16	6:30 p.m.	TCU^{†}	No. 4	Gaylord Family Oklahoma Memorial Stadium; Norman, OK	ABC	W 52–31	84,391
October 23	11:00 a.m.	at Kansas	No. 3	David Booth Kansas Memorial Stadium; Lawrence, KS	ESPN	W 35–23	26,321
October 30	2:30 p.m.	Texas Tech	No. 4	Gaylord Family Oklahoma Memorial Stadium; Norman, OK	ABC	W 52–21	82,732
November 13	11:00 a.m.	at No. 18 Baylor	No. 4	McLane Stadium; Waco, TX (Big Noon Kickoff)	FOX	L 14–27	46,782
November 20	11:00 a.m.	Iowa State	No. 12	Gaylord Family Oklahoma Memorial Stadium; Norman, OK (Big Noon Kickoff)	FOX	W 28–21	82,685
November 27	6:30 p.m.	at No. 7 Oklahoma State	No. 10	Boone Pickens Stadium; Stillwater, OK (Bedlam Series)	ABC	L 33–37	54,990
December 29	8:15 p.m.	vs. No. 15 Oregon*	No. 14	Alamodome; San Antonio, TX (Alamo Bowl)	ESPN	W 47–32	59,121
*Non-conference game; ^{†}Homecoming; Rankings from AP Poll (and CFP Rankings, after November 2) - Released prior to game; All times are in Central time

== Personnel ==
=== Roster ===
2021 Oklahoma Sooners Football
Quarterback: 1 Tanner Schafer – (redshirt) senior (6'3, 217); 5 Micah Bowens – (redshirt) freshman (5'11, 192); 7 Spencer Rattler – (redshirt) sophomore (6'1, 205); 13 Caleb Williams – freshman (6'1, 218); 15 Ben Harris – freshman (6'1, 204); 18 Carsten Groos – (redshirt) freshman (6'4, 227); 19 Ralph Rucker – freshman (6'0, 206); 87 Spencer Jones – (redshirt) senior (6'1, 202); Running back: 0 Eric Gray – junior (5'9, 206); 2 Tre Bradford – sophomore (5'11, 211); 23 Todd Hudson – (redshirt) sophomore (5'5, 188); 24 Marcus Major – (redshirt) sophomore (5'11, 224); 25 Jaden Knowles – (redshirt) junior (5'7, 191); 26 Kennedy Brooks – (redshirt) junior (6'2, 234); Wide receiver: 4 Mario Williams – freshman (5'9, 186); 6 Cody Jackson – freshman (5'11, 180); 8 Michael Woods II – senior (6'1, 198); 10 Theo Wease – junior (6'3, 192); 11 Jadon Haselwood – (redshirt) sophomore (6'2, 200); 12 Drake Stoops – (redshirt) junior (5'9, 190); 14 Jalil Farooq – freshman (6'1, 203); 16 Brian Darby – sophomore (6'0, 204); 17 Marvin Mims – sophomore (5'11, 177); 21 Marcellus Crutchfield – (redshirt) freshman (6'0, 183); 30 Major Melson – (redshirt) freshman (5'9, 176); 82 Adrian Scott – freshman (6'0, 170); 84 Davion Curtis – (redshirt) senior (6'0, 200); 85 Devin Staton – (redshirt) junior (6'1, 202); 86 Colt Atkinson – (redshirt) senior (6'0, 171); 89 Damon Smith – (redshirt) sophomore (6'1, 190); Tight end: 9 Brayden Willis – senior (6'3, 236); 18 Austin Stogner – junior (6'6, 262); 27 Jeremiah Hall – (redshirt) senior (6'2, 253); 31 Jackson Sumlin – (redshirt) freshman (6'2, 239); 80 Kayhon Russell – freshman (6'1, 190); Long snapper: 50 Jake Mann – freshman (5'9, 220); 51 Kasey Kelleher – (redshirt) senior (5'10, 234); 58 Ethan Lane – (redshirt) freshman (6'0, 247)	Offensive line: 52 Tyrese Robinson – OG – (redshirt) senior (6'3, 335); 54 Marquis Hayes – OG – (redshirt) senior (6'5, 349); 55 Aaryn Parks – OL – (redshirt) Freshman (6'5, 322); 59 Savion Byrd – OT – freshman (6'5, 315); 60 Matt Torrez – OT – (redshirt) freshman (6'3, 297); 61 Ian McIver – OL – (redshirt) senior (6'3, 315); 64 Wanya Morris – OL – junior (6'5, 312); 65 Finley Felix – OL – (redshirt) Senior (6'5, 298); 66 Robert Congel – OG – (redshirt) senior (6'4, 326); 69 Nate Anderson – OL – (redshirt) Freshman (6'4, 281); 70 Brey Walker – OG – (redshirt) junior (6'6, 342); 71 Anton Harrison – OL – sophomore (6'5, 309); 73 Andrew Raym – OG – sophomore (6'3, 320); 74 Marcus Alexander – OL – (redshirt) sophomore (6'3, 322); 75 Cullen Montgomery – OL – freshman (6'4, 362); 77 Erik Swenson – OT – (redshirt) senior (6'5, 326); 78 Marcus Hicks – OT – (redshirt) sophomore (6'5, 285); 79 Darrell Simpson – OT – (redshirt) junior (6'7, 369); Defensive line: 8 Perrion Winfrey – DT – senior (6'3, 297); 14 Reggie Grimes II – DE – sophomore (6'4, 266); 31 Jalen Redmond – DL – sophomore (6'2, 279); 33 Marcus Stripling – DE – junior (6'3, 250); 35 Nathan Rawlins-Kibonge – DE – freshman (6'5, 260); 40 Ethan Downs – DE – freshman (6'4, 257); 42 Noah Arinze – DL – (redshirt) freshman (6'5, 252); 44 Kelvin Gilliam – DL – freshman (6'2, 254); 88 Jordan Kelley – DT – (redshirt) junior (6'3, 292); 90 Josh Ellison – DT – junior (6'2, 291); 91 Dominique Jones – DL – (redshirt) senior (6'1, 292); 92 Kori Roberson – DL – (redshirt) sophomore (6'4, 288); 93 Reed Lindsey – DL – (redshirt) sophomore (6'4, 255); 94 Isaiah Coe – DL – junior (6'0, 292); 95 Isaiah Thomas – DE – (redshirt) senior (6'5, 267); 96 LaRon Stokes – DL – (redshirt) senior (6'5, 252); 98 Marcus Hicks – DL – freshman (6'5, 284)	Linebacker: 2 David Ugwoegbu – junior (6'4, 251); 3 Jamal Morris – (redshirt) sophomore (6'2, 210); 11 Nik Bonitto – (redshirt) junior (6'3, 238); 19 Caleb Kelly – (redshirt) senior (6'3, 232); 20 Clayton Smith – freshman (6'4, 232); 23 DaShaun White – senior (6'0, 227); 24 Brian Asamoah II – (redshirt) junior (6'1, 230); 28 Danny Stutsman – freshman (6'3, 229); 30 Brynden Walker – sophomore (6'2, 251); 38 Bryan Mead – (redshirt) senior (6'2, 226); 41 Jake McCoy – (redshirt) sophomore (6'2, 225); 45 Joseph Wete – (redshirt) sophomore (6'4, 233); 57 Mauresse Wren – (redshirt) junior (6'3, 227); Defensive back: 0 Woodi Washington – CB – (redshirt) sophomore (5'11, 192); 1 Joshua Eaton – CB – sophomore (6'2, 175); 4 Jaden Davis – CB – junior (5'10, 185); 5 Billy Bowman Jr. – DB – freshman (5'10, 188); 7 Latrell McCuthin – CB – freshman (6'1, 185); 9 D.J. Graham – CB – sophomore (5'11, 200); 10 Patrick Fields – S – senior (5'11, 204); 12 Key Lawrence – DB – sophomore (6'1, 208); 15 Bryson Washington – S – (redshirt) freshman (6'2, 197); 16 Justin Harrington – DB – junior (6'3, 215); 17 Damond Harmon – DB – freshman (6'0, 169); 21 Kendall Dennis – DB – (redshirt) freshman (5'11, 181); 22 Jeremiah Criddell – DB – (redshirt) sophomore (5'11, 197); 25 Justin Broiles – S – (redshirt) senior (5'10, 190); 26 Caleb Murphy – DB – (redshirt) junior (5'11, 210); 29 Jordan Mukes – S – freshman (6'1, 205); 32 Delarrin Turner-Yell – S – senior (5'10, 195); 34 Dorian Plumley – DB – freshman (6'0, 182); 39 Doug Collins – DB – (redshirt) junior (6'2, 206); 43 Ryan Peoples – CB – (redshirt) junior (5'11, 190); 48 Eric Windham – CB – (redshirt) sophomore (5'10, 193); 49 Pierce Hudgens – DB – (redshirt) freshman (6'1, 195); Placekicker: 36 Josh Plaster – (redshirt) sophomore (6'0, 184); 47 Gabe Brkic – (redshirt) junior (6'2, 198) (+P); Punter: 34 Zach Schmit – (redshirt) freshman (5'11, 165) (+K); 37 Michael Turk – (redshirt) senior (6'0, 230); 46 Reeves Mundschau – (redshirt) senior (5'11, 183)

=== Coaching staff ===
Name	Position	Alma Mater	Joined staff
Lincoln Riley	Head coach / Quarterbacks	Texas Tech (2006)	2015/2017
Alex Grinch	Defensive Coordinator / Safeties	Mount Union (2002)	2019
Jamar Cain	Outside linebackers / Defensive Ends	New Mexico State (2002)	2020
Joe Jon Finley	Assistant Head Coach for Offense / Tight Ends and H-Backs	Oklahoma (2008)	2021
Cale Gundy	Co-Offensive Coordinator / Recruiting Coordinator / Inside Receivers	Oklahoma (1994)	1999
Bill Bedenbaugh	Co-Offensive Coordinator / Offensive Line	Iowa Wesleyan (1995)	2013
Roy Manning	Cornerbacks	Michigan (2004)	2019
DeMarco Murray	Running backs	Oklahoma (2010)	2020
Brian Odom	Inside Linebackers	SE Oklahoma State (2004)	2019
Dennis Simmons	Assistant Head Coach/Passing Game Coordinator / Outside Receivers	BYU (1997)	2015
Calvin Thibodeaux	Defensive line	Oklahoma (2006)	2016

Graduate assistants

Analysts

=== Depth chart ===
Defense

FS
Pat Fields
Key Lawrence
Jordan Mukes

JACK	MIKE	WILL	SAM
Nik Bonitto	DaShaun White	-	Brian Asamoah II
Marcus Stripling	David Ugwoegbu	-	Caleb Kelly
Brynden Walker; Clayton Smith	Shane Whittier; Jamal Morris	–	Bryan Mead

SS
Delarrin Turner-Yell
Justin Harrington
Bryson Washington

CB
Jaden Davis
D.J. Graham
–

DE	NT	DE
LaRon Stokes; Jalen Redmond	Perrion Winfrey	Jeremiah Criddell
Kori Robinson	Josh Ellison	Billy Bowman Jr.
–	Jordan Kelley	–

CB
Woodi Washington
Latrell McCutchin
Joshua Eaton

Offense

WR
Theo Wease
Michael Woods II
Jalil Farooq

WR
Marvin Mims
Mario Williams
Cody Jackson

LT	LG	C	RG	RT
Wanya Morris	Marquis Hayes	Andrew Raym	Tyrese Robinson	Erik Swenson
Anton Harrison	Marcus Alexander	Robert Congel	Chris Murray	Brey Walker
Nate Anderson	Savion Byrd	Ian McIver	Darrell Simpson	Aaron Parks

TE
Austin Stogner
Jeremiah Hall
Brayden Willis

WR
Jadon Haselwood
Drake Stoops
Brian Darby

QB
Caleb Williams
Spencer Rattler
Micah Bowens

Special teams
PK Gabe Brkic
P Michael Turk
Reeves Mundschau
Zach Schmit
KR Mario Williams
Billy Bowman Jr.
PR Marvin Mims
LS Kasey Kelleher
H Reeves Mundschau
Spencer Jones

RB
Kennedy Brooks
Eric Gray
Tre Bradford
Marcus Major
Mikey Henderson

== Game summaries ==
=== At Tulane ===
No. 2 Oklahoma Sooners (0–0) vs. Tulane Green Wave (0–0)

Quarter	1	2	3	4	Total
No. 2 Oklahoma	14	23	3	0	40
Tulane	14	0	8	13	35

at Gaylord Family Oklahoma Memorial Stadium • Norman, OK (Originally scheduled at Tulane, location changed due to Hurricane Ida)

- Date: Saturday, September 4, 2021
- Game time: 11:00 a.m. CDT
- Game weather: • Sunny Temperature: 88
- Game attendance: 42,206
- Referee: Michael Vandervelde
- TV announcers (ABC): Dave Pasch (play-by-play), Dusty Dvoracek (analyst) and Tom Luginbill (sideline)

Game information

First Quarter

- (11:15) TUL - Michael Pratt 6 yard pass to Cameron Carroll, Graham Dable kick (Drive: 8 plays, 55 yards, 3:08; TUL 7—0)
- (5:59) OKLA - Spencer Rattler 1 yard rush, Gabe Brkic kick (Drive: 11 plays, 75 yards, 5:16; Tied 7-7)
- (4:44) TUL - Jaetavian Toles 15 yard rush, Graham Dable kick (Drive: 4 plays, 75 yards, 1:15; TUL 14-7)
- (2:38) OKLA - Caleb Williams 1 yard rush, Gabe Brkic kick (Drive: 5 plays, 75 yards, 2:06; Tied 14-14)

Second Quarter

- (10:00) OKLA - Kennedy Brooks 1 yard rush, Gabe Brkic kick (Drive: 9 plays, 84 yards, 4:53; OU 21-14) '
- (8:59) OKLA - Gabe Brkic 26 yard FG (Drive: 4 plays, 2 yards, 00:49; OU 24-14)
- (7:58) OKLA - Gabe Brkic 51 yard FG (Drive: 4 plays, 0 yards, 0:53; OU 27-14)
- (3:01) OKLA - Spencer Rattler 6 yard pass to Mario Williams, Gabe Brkic kick (Drive: 7 plays, 78 yards, 3:03; OU 34-14)
- (0:00) OKLA - Gabe Brkic 56 yard FG (Drive: 3 plays, 2 yards, 0:30; OU 37-14)

Third Quarter

- (3:31) TUL - Michael Pratt 4 yard rush, Duece Watts 2 point conversion (Drive: 11 yards, 42 plays, 3:34; OU 37-22)
- (1:01) OKLA - Gabe Brkic 55 yard FG (Drive: 7 plays, 37 yards, 2:30; OU 40-22)

Fourth Quarter

- (11:28) TUL - Michael Pratt 5 yard pass to Cameron Carroll, 2 point failed (Drive: 8 plays, 47 yards, 2:23; OU 40-28)
- (2:18) TUL - Michael Pratt 5 yard pass to Will Wallace, Merek Glover kick (Drive: 8 plays, 80 yards, 2:45; OU 40-35)

Statistics	OKLA	TULANE
First downs	24	24
Total yards	430	396
Rushes/yards	35-116	32-100
Passing yards	314	296
Passing: Comp–Att–Int	31-40-2	27-45
Time of possession	33:23	26:37

Team	Category	Player	Statistics
Oklahoma	Passing	Spencer Rattler	30/39, 314 yards, 1 TD, 1 INT
Oklahoma	Rushing	Kennedy Brooks	14 carries, 87 yards, 1 TD
Oklahoma	Receiving	Mario Williams	6 receptions, 37 yards, 1 TD
Tulane	Passing	Michael Pratt	27/44, 296 yards, 3 TD
Tulane	Rushing	Michael Pratt	15 carries, 34 yards, 1 TD
Tulane	Receiving	Tyrick James	6 receptions, 93 yards

=== Vs. Western Carolina ===
Western Carolina Catamounts (0–1) vs. No. 4 Oklahoma Sooners (1–0) - Game summary

Quarter	1	2	3	4	Total
Western Carolina	0	0	0	0	0
No. 4 Oklahoma	17	28	17	14	76

at Gaylord Family Oklahoma Memorial Stadium • Norman, OK

- Date: Saturday, September 11, 2021
- Game time: 6:00 p.m. CDT
- Game weather: • SunnyTemperature:90
- Game attendance: 83,538
- Referee: Derek Anderson
- TV announcers (BSOK PPV): Chad McKee (play-by-play), Chuck Long (analyst) & Lesley McCaslin

Game information

First Quarter

- (10:28) OKLA - Spencer Rattler 7 yard pass to Jadon Haselwood, Gabe Brkić kick (Drive: 8 plays, 70 yards, 2:07; OU 7-0)
- (6:56) OKLA - Gabe Brkić 56 yard FG (Drive: 5 plays, 33 yards, 1:44; OU 10-0)
- (5:04) OKLA - Spencer Rattler 20 yard pass to Eric Gray, Gabe Brkić kick (Drive: 3 plays, 58 yards, 0:57; OU 17-0)

Second Quarter

- (14:57) OKLA - Kennedy Brooks 1 yard rush, Gabe Brkić kick (Drive: 10 plays, 65 yards, 3:19; OU 24-0)
- (12:58) OKLA - Spencer Rattler 4 yard pass to Michael Woods II, Gabe Brkić kick (Drive: 4 plays, 31 yards, 1:04; OU 31-0)
- (8:11) OKLA - Spencer Rattler 10 yard pass to Mario Williams, Gabe Brkić kick (Drive: 10 plays, 78 yards, 3:28; OU 38-0)
- (1:54) OKLA - Spencer Rattler 6 yard pass to Jadon Haselwood, Gabe Brkić kick (Drive: 7 plays, 60 yards, 2:56; OU 45-0)

Third Quarter

- (11:52) OKLA Jaden Knowles 1 yard rush, Zach Schmit kick (Drive: 8 plays, 75 yards, 3:08; OU 52-0)
- (8:15) OKLA - Zach Schmit 46 yard FG (Drive: 5 plays, 10 yards, 2:15; OU 55-0)
- (3:43) OKLA - Jaden Knowles 29 yard rush, Zach Schmit kick (Drive: 2 plays, 50 yards, 0:56; OU 62-0)

Fourth Quarter

- (10:42) OKLA - Todd Hudson 6 yard rush, Zach Schmit kick (Drive: 6 plays, 73 yards, 6:11; OU 69-0)
- (1:36) OKLA - Todd Hudson 2 yard rush, Zach Schmit kick (Drive: 6 plays, 25 yards, 3:14; OU 76-0)

Statistics	WCU	OKLA
First downs	11	31
Total yards	178	624
Rushes/yards	27-55	38-227
Passing yards	123	347
Passing: Comp–Att–Int	21-36-1	27-38
Time of possession	27:01	32:59

Team	Category	Player	Statistics
Western Carolina	Passing	Rogan Wells	16/29, 86 yards
Western Carolina	Rushing	Carlos Davis	3 carries, 27 yards
Western Carolina	Receiving	Kenny Benjamin	6 receptions, 34 yards
Oklahoma	Passing	Spencer Rattler	20/26, 243 yards, 5 TD's
Oklahoma	Rushing	Eric Gray	9 carries, 74 yards
Oklahoma	Receiving	Mario Williams	4 receptions, 49 yards, 1 TD

=== Vs. Nebraska ===
Nebraska Cornhuskers (2–1) vs. No. 3 Oklahoma Sooners (2–0) - Game summary

Quarter	1	2	3	4	Total
Nebraska	3	0	6	7	16
No. 3 Oklahoma	7	0	9	7	23

at Gaylord Family Oklahoma Memorial Stadium • Norman, OK

- Date: Saturday, September 18, 2021
- Game time: 11:00 a.m. CDT
- Game weather: • Sunny Temperature: 87
- Game attendance: 84,659
- Referee: Reggie Smith
- TV announcers (FOX): Gus Johnson (Play-by-Play), Joel Klatt (analyst), Jenny Taft (sideline)

Game information

First Quarter

- (8:02) OKLA - Spencer Rattler 1 yard rush, Gabe Brkic kick (Drive: 14 plays, 75 yards, 6:58; OU 7-0)
- (1:21) NEB - Connor Culp 51 yard FG (Drive: 14 plays, 42 yards, 6:41; OU 7-3)

Second Quarter

- No Score

Third Quarter

- (3:50) OKLA - Spencer Rattler 1 yard pass to Jeremiah Hall, Gabe Brkic kick (Drive: 10 plays, 80 yards, 5:29; OU 14-3)
- (0:08) NEB - Adrian Martinez 4 yard rush, Kelen Meyer kick failed (Drive: 9 plays, 75 yards, 3:42; OU 14-9)
- (0:08) OKLA - Pat Fields 100 yard PAT return (OU 16-9)

Fourth Quarter

- (10:24) OKLA - Kennedy Brooks 2 yard rush, Gabe Brkic kick (Drive: 12 plays, 65 yards, 4:38; OU 23-9)
- (5:38) NEB - Adrian Martinez 21 yard pass to Omar Manning, Connor Culp kick (Drive: 3 plays, 38 yards, 1:02; OU 23-16)

Statistics	NEB	OKLA
First downs	18	21
Total yards	384	408
Rushes/yards	38-95	35-194
Passing yards	289	214
Passing: Comp–Att–Int	19-25-1	24-34
Time of possession	29:10	30:50

Team	Category	Player	Statistics
Nebraska	Passing	Adrian Martinez	19/25, 289 yards, 1 TD, 1 INT
Nebraska	Rushing	Rahmiir Johnson	11 carries, 42 yards
Nebraska	Receiving	Austin Allen	6 receptions, 43 yards
Oklahoma	Passing	Spencer Rattler	24/34, 214 yards, 1 TD
Oklahoma	Rushing	Eric Gray	15 carries, 84 yards
Oklahoma	Receiving	Jadon Haselwood	6 receptions, 61 yards

=== vs West Virginia ===
West Virginia Mountaineers (2–1) vs. No. 4 Oklahoma Sooners (3–0)

Quarter	1	2	3	4	Total
West Virginia	7	3	3	0	13
No. 4 Oklahoma	7	0	3	6	16

at Gaylord Family Oklahoma Memorial Stadium • Norman, OK

- Date: Saturday, September 25, 2021
- Game time: 6:30 p.m. CDT
- Game weather: • Sunny Temperature: 86
- Game attendance: 84,353
- Referee: David Alvarez
- TV announcers (ABC): Chris Fowler (play-by-play), Kirk Herbstreit (analyst) and Holly Rowe (sideline)

Game information

First Quarter

- (5:53) WVU - Garrett Greene 2 yard rush, Casey Legg kick (Drive: 17 plays, 75 yards, 9:07; WVU 7-0)
- (2:46) OKLA - Spencer Rattler 5 yard pass to Austin Stogner, Gabe Brkic kick (Drive: 7 plays, 67 yards, 3:00; Tied 7-7)

Second Quarter

- (0:00) WVU - Casey Legg 25 yard FG (Drive: 9 plays 41 yards, 2:16; WVU 10-7)

Third Quarter

- (11:26) OKLA - Gabe Brkic 28 yard FG (Drive: 10 plays, 64 yards, 3:29; Tied 10-10)
- (5:21) WVU - Casey Legg 21 yard FG (Drive: 11 plays, 68 yards, 5:59; WVU 13-10)

Fourth Quarter

- (8:52) OKLA - Gabe Brkic 35 yard FG (Drive: 16 plays, 62 yards, 8:11; Tied 13-13)
- (0:00) OKLA - Gabe Brkic 30 yard FG (Drive: 14 plays, 80 yards, 3:39; OU 16-13)

Statistics	WVU	OKLA
First downs	18	19
Total yards	226	313
Rushes/yards	29-47	28-57
Passing yards	179	256
Passing: Comp–Att–Int	23-34-1	26-36-1
Time of possession	33:00	27:00

Team	Category	Player	Statistics
West Virginia	Passing	Jarret Doege	20/29, 160 yards, 1 INT
West Virginia	Rushing	Leddie Brown	15 carries, 56 yards
West Virginia	Receiving	Bryce Ford-Wheaton	8 receptions, 93 yards
Oklahoma	Passing	Spencer Rattler	26/36, 256 yards, 1 TD, 1 INT
Oklahoma	Rushing	Eric Gray	12 carries, 38 yards
Oklahoma	Receiving	Michael Woods II	8 receptions, 86 yards

=== At Kansas State ===
No. 6 Oklahoma Sooners (4–0) vs. Kansas State Wildcats (3–1)

Quarter	1	2	3	4	Total
No. 6 Oklahoma	3	10	14	10	37
Kansas State	7	3	7	14	31

at Bill Snyder Family Stadium • Manhattan, KS

- Date: Saturday, October 2, 2021
- Game time: 2:30 p.m. CDT
- Game weather: •Cloudy Temperature: 73
- Game attendance: 47,690
- Referee: Kevin Hassell
- TV announcers (FOX): Aaron Goldsmith (play-by-play) and Brock Huard (analyst)

Game information

First Quarter

- (4:42) OKLA- Gabe Brkic 40 yard FG (Drive: 7 plays, -4 yards, 4:03; OU 3-0)
- (0:11) KSU - Skylar Thompson 2 yard pass to Phillip Brooks, Tatien Winkel kick (Drive: 10 plays, 75 yards, 4:31; KSU 7-3)

Second Quarter

- (10:19) OKLA - Jeremiah Hall 4 yard rush, Gabe Brkic kick (Drive: 12 plays, 75 yards, 4:52; OU 10-7)
- (1:30) KSU - Tatien Winkel 30 yard FG (Drive: 19 plays, 63 yards, 8:49; Tied 10-10)
- (0:02) OKLA - Gabe Brkic 27 yard FG (Drive: 9 plays, 65 yards, 1:28; OU 13-10)

Third Quarter

- (11:40) OKLA - Kennedy Brooks 2 yard rush, Gabe Brkic kick (Drive: 9 plays, 75 yards, 3:20; OU 20-10)
- (5:30) OKLA - Spencer Rattler 14 yard pass to Michael Woods II, Gabe Brkic kick (Drive: 9 plays, 90 yards, 4:27; OU 27-10)
- (3:19) KSU - Skyler Thompson 7 yard pass to Deuce Vaughn, Tatien Winkel kick (Drive: 5 plays, 75 yards, 2:11; OU 27-17)

Fourth Quarter

- (9:49) OKLA - Spencer Rattler 1 yard pass to Jeremiah Hall, Gabe Brkic kick (Drive: 6 plays, 52 yards, 3:16; OU 34-17)
- (4:15) KSU - Skyler Thompson 6 yard pass to Landry Weber, Tatien Winkel kick (Drive: 11 plays, 75 yards, 5:34; OU 34-24)
- (1:33) OKLA - Gabe Brkic 47 yard FG (Drive: 6 plays, -5 yards, 2:41; OU 37-24)
- (1:20) KSU - Malik Knowles 93 yard KO Return, Tatien Winkel kick (OU 37-31)

Statistics	OKLA	KSU
First downs	22	22
Total yards	392	420
Rushes/yards	32-131	27-100
Passing yards	261	320
Passing: Comp–Att–Int	23-28-1	29-41
Time of possession	27:18	32:42

Team	Category	Player	Statistics
Oklahoma	Passing	Spencer Rattler	22/25, 243 yards, 2 TD's, 1 INT
Oklahoma	Rushing	Kennedy Brooks	15 carries, 91 yards, 1 TD
Oklahoma	Receiving	Marvin Mims	4 receptions, 71 yards
Kansas State	Passing	Skylar Thompson	29/41, 320 yards, 3 TD's
Kansas State	Rushing	Deuce Vaughn	15 carries, 51 yards
Kansas State	Receiving	Deuce Vaughn	10 receptions, 104 yards, 1 TD

=== Vs. No. 21 Texas ===
No. 6 Oklahoma Sooners (5–0) vs. No. 21 Texas Longhorns (4–1)

Quarter	1	2	3	4	Total
No. 6 Oklahoma	7	13	10	25	55
No. 21 Texas	28	10	3	7	48

at Cotton Bowl • Dallas, TX

- Date: Saturday, October 10, 2020
- Game time: 11:00 a.m. CDT
- Game weather: •Sunny Temperature:
- Referee: Scott Campbell
- TV announcers (ABC): Chris Fowler (play-by-play), Kirk Herbstreit (analyst) and Holly Rowe (sideline)

Game information

First Quarter

- (14:46) TEX - Casey Thompson 75 yard pass to Xavier Worthy, Cameron Dicker kick (Drive: 1 play, 75 yards, 00:14; UT 7-0)
- (13:07) TEX – Bijan Robinson 2 yard rush, Cameron Dicker kick (Drive: 2 plays, 2 yards, 00:09; UT 14-0)
- (9:14) OKLA - Spencer Rattler 2 yard rush, Gabe Brkic kick (Drive: 10 plays, 75 yards, 3:53; UT 14-7)
- (4:39) TEX - Casey Thompson 10 yard pass to Joshua Moore, Cameron Dicker kick (Drive: 3 plays, 51 yards, 1:14; UT 21-7)
- (1:02) TEX - Casey Thompson 48 yard pass to Joshua Moore, Cameron Dicker kick (Drive: 6 plays, 80 yards, 1:55; UT 28-7)

Second Quarter

- (14:45) OKLA - Caleb Williams 66 yard rush, Gabe Brkic kick (Drive: 4 plays, 75 yards, 1:17; UT 28-14)
- (12:00) OKLA - Gabe Brkic 40 yard FG (Drive: 5 plays, 52 yards, 1:17; UT 28-17)
- (6:41) TEX - Casey Thompson 2 yard pass to Jared Wiley, Cameron Dicker kick (Drive: 3 plays, 55 yards, 1:29; UT 35-17)
- (3:02) OKLA - Gabe Brkic 35 yard FG (Drive: 10 plays, 57 yards,3:39; UT 35-20)
- (0:00) TEX - Cameron Dicker 38 yard FG (Drive: 9 plays, 55 yards, 3:02; UT 38-20)

Third Quarter

- (6:22) OKLA - Gabe Brkic 29 yard FG (Drive: 9 plays, 30 yards, 4:53; UT 38-23)
- (2:45) TEX - Cameron Dicker 41 yard FG (Drive: 8 plays, 53 yards, 3:31; UT 41-23)
- (1:02) OKLA - Caleb Williams 14 yard pass to Marvin Mims, Gabe Brkic kick (Drive: 4 plays, 78 yards, 1:36; UT 41-30)

Fourth Quarter

- (11:44) OKLA - Gabe Brkic 26 yard FG (Drive: 9 plays, 71 yards, 2:59; UT 41-33)
- (7:25) OKLA - Caleb Williams 52 yard pass to Marvin Mims, Spencer Rattler PAT pass to Drake Stoops (Drive: 5 plays, 60 yards, 3:11; Tied 41-41)
- (7:10) OKLA - Kennedy Brooks 18 yard rush, Gabe Brkic kick (Drive: 1 plays, 18 yards, 0:07; OU 48-41)
- (1:23) TEX - Casey Thompson 31 yard pass to Xavier Worthy, Cameron Dicker kick (Drive: 6 plays, 60 yards, 1:32; Tied 48-48)
- (0:03) OKLA - Kennedy Brooks 33 yard rush, Gabe Brkic kick (Drive: 6 plays, 75 yards, 1:20; OU 55-48)

Statistics	OKLA	TEX
First downs	26	19
Total yards	662	516
Rushes/yards	41/339	27/128
Passing yards	323	388
Passing: Comp–Att–Int	24-40-1	20-34
Time of possession	35:23	24:37

Team	Category	Player	Statistics
Oklahoma	Passing	Caleb Williams	15/24, 211 yards, 2 TD's
Oklahoma	Rushing	Kennedy Brooks	25 carries, 217 yards, 2 TD's
Oklahoma	Receiving	Marvin Mims	5 receptions, 136 yards, 2 TD's
Texas	Passing	Casey Thompson	20/34, 388 yards, 5 TD's
Texas	Rushing	Bijan Robinson	20 carries, 137 yards, 1 TD
Texas	Receiving	Xavier Worthy	9 receptions, 261 yards, 2 TD's

=== Vs. TCU ===
TCU Horned Frogs (3–2) vs. No. 4 Oklahoma Sooners (6–0)

Quarter	1	2	3	4	Total
TCU	7	7	10	7	31
No. 4 Oklahoma	14	10	21	7	52

at Gaylord Family Oklahoma Memorial Stadium • Norman, OK

- Date: Saturday, October 16, 2021
- Game time: 6:30 p.m. CDT
- Game weather: • Sunny Temperature: 65
- Game attendance: 84,391
- Referee: Kevin Mar
- TV announcers (ABC): Chris Fowler (play-by-play), Kirk Herbstreit (analyst) and Holly Rowe (sideline)

Game information

First Quarter

- (12:01) OKLA - Kennedy Brooks 2 yard rush, Gabe Brkic kick (Drive: 7 plays, 75 yards, 2:59; OU 7-0)
- (05:40) OKLA - Caleb Williams 17 yard pass to Jeremiah Hall, Gabe Brkic kick (Drive: 7 plays, 62 yards, 4:24; OU 14-0)
- (3:43) TCU - Max Duggan 53 yard pass to Kendre Miller, Griffin Kell kick (Drive: 5 plays, 75 yards, 1:57; OU 14-7)

Second Quarter

- (11:13) OKLA - Gabe Brkic 28 yard FG (Drive: 6 plays, 59 yards, 2:37; OU 17-7)
- (4:27) TCU - Max Duggan 20 yard pass to Quentin Johnston, Griffin Kell kick (Drive: 14 plays, 78 yards, 6:38; OU 17-14)
- (0:20) OKLA - Caleb Williams 11 yard pass to Jadon Haselwood, Gabe Brkic kick (Drive: 5 plays, 76 yards, 1:23; OU 24-14)

Third Quarter

- (11:48) OKLA - Caleb Williams 16 yard pass to Jadon Haselwood, Gabe Brkic kick (Drive: 3 plays, 77 yards, 1:33; OU 31-14)
- (11:01) TCU - Max Duggan 75 yard pass to Quentin Johnston, Griffin Kell kick (Drive: 2 plays, 80 yards, 00:42; OU 31-21)
- (9:21) OKLA - Caleb Williams 7 yard pass to Jadon Haselwood, Gabe Brkic kick (Drive: 3 plays, 33 yards, 1:40; OU 38-21)
- (4:38) TCU - Griffin Kell 22 yard FG (Drive: 12 plays, 71 yards, 4:43; OU 38-24)
- (2:20) OKLA - Caleb Williams 41 yard rush, Gabe Brkic kick (Drive: 5 plays, 75 yards, 2:18; OU 45-24)

Fourth Quarter

- (11:16) TCU - Max Duggan 25 yard pass to Quentin Johnston, Griffin Kell kick (Drive: 4 plays, 47 yards, 1:44; OU 45-31)
- (1:09) OKLA - Eric Gray 2 yard rush, Gabe Brkic kick (Drive: 9 plays, 68 yards, 5:44; OU 52-31)

Statistics	TCU	OKLA
First downs	21	25
Total yards	519	525
Rushes/yards	37-183	35-230
Passing yards	336	295
Passing: Comp–Att–Int	20-36	18-23
Time of possession	29:13	30:47

Team	Category	Player	Statistics
TCU	Passing	Max Duggan	20/32, 336 yards, 4 TD's
TCU	Rushing	Emari Demercado	7 carries, 57 yards
TCU	Receiving	Quentin Johnston	7 receptions, 185 yards, 3 TD's
Oklahoma	Passing	Caleb Williams	18/23, 295 yards, 4 TD's
Oklahoma	Rushing	Kennedy Brooks	20 carries, 153 yards, 1 TD
Oklahoma	Receiving	Jadon Haselwood	6 receptions, 56 yards, 3 TD's

=== At Kansas ===
No. 3 Oklahoma Sooners (7–0) vs. Kansas Jayhawks (1–5)

Quarter	1	2	3	4	Total
No. 3 Oklahoma	0	0	14	21	35
Kansas	7	3	7	6	23

at David Booth Kansas Memorial Stadium • Lawrence, KS

- Date: Saturday, October 23, 2021
- Game time: 11:00 a.m. CDT
- Game weather: • CloudyTemperature: 54
- Referee: Michael Vndervelde
- TV announcers (ESPN): Mark Jones, Robert Griffin III, Quint Kessenich

Game information

First Quarter

- (5:45) KAN - Devin Neal 1 yard rush, Jacob Borcila kick (Drive: 14 plays, 80 yards, 9:11; KU 7-0)

Second Quarter

- (11:24) KAN - Jacob Borcila 28 yard FG (Drive: 12 plays, 69 yards, 6:36; KU 10-0)

Third Quarter

- (7:57) OKLA - Caleb Williams 5 yard pass to Jadon Haselwood, Gabe Brkic kick (Drive: 14 plays, 75 yards, 7:03; KU 10-7)
- (1:30) KAN - Devin Neal 1 yard rush, Jacob Borcila kick (Drive: 10 plays, 75 yards, 6:27; KU 17-7)
- (0:14) OKLA - Caleb Williams 8 yard pass to Jeremiah Hall, Gabe Brkic kick (Drive: 3 plays, 75 yards, 1:16; KU 17-14)

Fourth Quarter

- (12:25) OKLA - Kennedy Brooks 1 yard rush, Gabe Brkic kick (Drive: 4 plays, 48 yards, 1:28; OU 21-17)
- (7:53) OKLA - Caleb Williams 40 yard rush, Gabe Brkic kick (Drive: 4 plays 47 yards, 1:29; OU 28-17)
- (5:56) KAN - Jason Bean 14 yard pass to Luke Grimm, 2 point conversation failed (Drive: 5 plays, 75 yards, 1:57; OU 28-23)
- (0:42) OKLA - Kennedy Brooks 4 yard rush, Gabe Brkic kick (Drive: 12 plays, 75 yards, 5:14; OU 35-23)

Statistics	OKLA	KAN
First downs	18	23
Total yards	398	412
Rushes/yards	34-220	42-166
Passing yards	178	246
Passing: Comp–Att–Int	15-20-1	17-23
Time of possession	24:30	35:30

Team	Category	Player	Statistics
Oklahoma	Passing	Caleb Williams	15/20, 178 yards, 2 TD's 1 INT
Oklahoma	Rushing	Kennedy Brooks	24 carries, 79 yards, 2 TD's
Oklahoma	Receiving	Eric Gray	3 receptions, 42 yards
Kansas	Passing	Jason Bean	17/23, 246 yards, 1 TD
Kansas	Rushing	Devin Neal	23 carries, 100 yards, 2 TD's
Kansas	Receiving	Kwamie Lassiter II	7 receptions, 101 yards

=== Vs. Texas Tech ===
Texas Tech Red Raiders (5–3) vs. No. 4 Oklahoma Sooners (8–0)

Quarter	1	2	3	4	Total
Texas Tech	7	0	7	7	21
No. 4 Oklahoma	14	14	10	14	52

at Gaylord Family Oklahoma Memorial Stadium • Norman, OK

- Date: Saturday, October 30, 2021
- Game time: 2:30 p.m. CDT
- Game weather: •Sunny Temperature: 72
- Game attendance: 82,732
- Referee: Scott Campbell
- TV announcers (ABC): Dave Pasch (play-by-play), Dusty Dvoracek (analyst) and Tom Luginbill (sideline)

Game information

First Quarter

- (6:32) OKLA - Caleb Williams 22 yard pass to Mario Williams, Gabe Brkic kick (Drive: 7 plays, 95 yards,3:08; OU 7-0)
- (2:31) TTU - Henry Colombi 17 yard pass to Erik Ezukanma, Jonathan Garibay kick (Drive: 8 plays, 83 yards, 3:54; Tied 7-7)
- (1:07) OKLA - Caleb Williams 67 yard pass to Marvin Mims, Gabe Brkic kick (Drive: 3 plays, 78 yards, 1:17; OU 14-7)

Second Quarter

- (10:11) OKLA - Caleb Williams 8 yard pass to Brayden Willis, Gabe Brkic kick (Drive: 9 plays, 91 yards, 3:45; OU 21-7)
- (7:26) OKLA - Caleb Williams 12 yard pass to Drake Stoops, Gabe Brkic kick (Drive: 2 plays, 17 yards, 0:56; OU 28-7)

Third Quarter

- (9:44) OKLA - Gabe Brkic 56 yard FG (Drive: 11 plays, 39 yards, 5:16; OU 31-7)
- (5:52) OKLA - Caleb Williams 43 yard pass to Marvin Mims, Gabe Brkic kick (Drive: 1 plays, 43 yards, 0:08; OU 38-7)
- (0:44) TTU - Donovan Smith 17 yard pass to J.J. Sparkman, Jonathan Garibay kick (Drive: 10 plays, 75 yards, 5:08; OU 38-14)

Fourth Quarter

- (10:56) OKLA - Caleb Williams 9 yard pass to Austin Stogner, Gabe Brkic kick (Drive: 8 plays, 75 yards, 4:48; OU 45-14)
- (6:10) OKLA - Spencer Rattler 42 yard pass to Brian Darby, Gabe Brkic kick (Drive: 4 plays, 49 yards, 1:31; OU 52-14)
- (3:29) TTU - Xavier White 1 yard rush, Jonathan Garibay kick (Drive:6 plays, 62 yards, 2:36; OU 52-21)

Statistics	TTU	OKLA
First downs	22	26
Total yards	373	541
Rushes/yards	32-104	20-72
Passing yards	269	469
Passing: Comp–Att–Int	24-34-2	28-35
Time of possession	33:24	26:36

Team	Category	Player	Statistics
Texas Tech	Passing	Donovan Smith	17/22, 192 yards, 1 TD, 1 INT
Texas Tech	Rushing	Xavier White	10 carries, 42 yards, 1 TD
Texas Tech	Receiving	Erik Ezukanma	8 receptions, 123 yards, 1 TD
Oklahoma	Passing	Caleb Williams	23/30, 402 yards, 6 TD's
Oklahoma	Rushing	Kennedy Brooks	8 carries, 35 yards
Oklahoma	Receiving	Mario Williams	5 receptions, 100 yards, 1 TD

=== At No. 13 Baylor ===
No. 8 Oklahoma Sooners (9–0) vs. No. 13 Baylor Bears (7–2)

Quarter	1	2	3	4	Total
No. 8 Oklahoma	0	7	0	7	14
No. 13 Baylor	0	7	3	17	27

at McLane Stadium • Waco, TX

- Date: Saturday, November 13, 2021
- Game time: 11:00 a.m. CST
- Game weather: sunny • Temperature: 57°F
- Game attendance: 46,782
- Referee: Kevin Mar
- TV announcers (Fox): Gus Johnson (Play-by-Play), Joel Klatt (analyst), Jenny Taft (sideline)

Game information

First Quarter

No scoring

Second Quarter

- (10:20) OKLA – Caleb Williams 2 yard run, Gabe Brkic kick (Drive: 9 plays, 78 yards, 4:01; OKLA 7–0)
- (4:44) BU – Tyquan Thornton 8 yard pass from Gerry Bohanon, Isaiah Hankins kick (Drive: 10 plays, 75 yards, 5:36; 7–7)

Third Quarter

- (11:49) BU – Isaiah Hankins 32 yard field goal (Drive: 7 plays, 51 yards, 3:11; BU 10–7)

Fourth Quarter

- (13:13) BU – Gerry Bohanon 5 yard run, Isaiah Hankins kick (Drive: 3 plays, 83 yards, 1:32; BU 17–7)
- (3:57) BU – Gerry Bohanon 14 yard run, Isaiah Hankins kick (Drive: 11 plays, 80 yards, 5:50; BU 24–7)
- (2:26) OKLA – Kennedy Brooks 1 yard run, Gabe Brkic kick (Drive: 4 plays, 75 yards, 1:31; BU 24–14)
- (0:00) BU – Isaiah Hankins 32 yard field goal (Drive: 6 plays, 17 yards, 2:26; BU 27–14)

Statistics	OKLA	BU
First downs	17	24
Total yards	260	414
Rushes/yards	28/78	27/297
Passing yards	182	117
Passing: Comp–Att–Int	14–25–2	12–21–1
Time of possession	24:41	35:19

Team	Category	Player	Statistics
Oklahoma	Passing	Caleb Williams	10–19, 146 yards, 2 INT
Oklahoma	Rushing	Kennedy Brooks	13 carries, 51 yards, 1 TD
Oklahoma	Receiving	Michael Woods II	4 receptions, 53 yards
Baylor	Passing	Gerry Bohanon	12–21, 117 yards, 1 TD, 1 INT
Baylor	Rushing	Abram Smith	20 carries, 148 yards
Baylor	Receiving	Tyquan Thornton	4 receptions, 41 yards, 1 TD

=== Vs. Iowa State ===
Iowa State Cyclones (6–4) vs. No. 13 Oklahoma Sooners (9–1)

Quarter	1	2	3	4	Total
Iowa State	7	0	0	14	21
No. 13 Oklahoma	7	7	7	7	28

at Gaylord Family Oklahoma Memorial Stadium • Norman, OK

- Date: Saturday, November 20, 2021
- Game time: 11:00 a.m. CST
- Game weather: • Sunny Temperature:59
- Game attendance: 82,685
- Referee: Brandon Cruse
- TV announcers (Fox): Gus Johnson (Play-by-Play), Joel Klatt (analyst), Jenny Taft (sideline)

Game information

First Quarter

- (10:00) ISU - Breece Hall 1 yard rush, Andrew Mevis kick (Drive: 11 plays, 75 yards, 5:00; ISU 7-0)
- (9:03) OKLA - Caleb Williams 74 yard rush, Gabe Brkic kick (Drive: 2 plays, 75 yards, 0:47; Tied 7-7)

Second Quarter

- (0:09) OKLA - Jalen Redmond 42 yard fumble return, Gabe Brkic kick (OU 14-7)

Third Quarter

- (4:02) OKLA - Caleb Williams 11 yard pass to Mario Williams, Gabe Brkic kick (Drive: 9 plays, 64 yards, 3:06; OU 21-7)

Fourth Quarter

- (10:52) ISU Hunter Dekkers 12 yard pass to Chase Allen, Andrew Mevis kick (Drive: 13 plays, 73 yards, 6:03; OU 21-14)
- (5:06) OKLA - Eric Gray 7 yard rush, Gabe Brkic kick (Drive: 5 plays, 68 yards, 2:20; OU 28-14)
- (2:57) ISU - Brock Purdy 2 yard pass to Charlie Kolar, Andrew Mevis kick (Drive: 7 plays, 75 yards, 2:09; OU 28-21)

Statistics	ISU	OKLA
First downs	25	14
Total yards	361	305
Rushes/yards	35/51	34/209
Passing yards	310	96
Passing: Comp–Att–Int	35-52-2	9-19-1
Time of possession	38:20	21:40

Team	Category	Player	Statistics
Iowa State	Passing	Brock Purdy	30/41, 281 yards, 1 TD, 1 INT
Iowa State	Rushing	Breece Hall	19 carries, 58 yards, 1 TD
Iowa State	Receiving	Charlie Kolar	12 receptions, 152 yards, 1 TD
Oklahoma	Passing	Caleb Williams	8/18, 87 yards, 1 TD, 1 INT
Oklahoma	Rushing	Kennedy Brooks	17 carries, 115 yards
Oklahoma	Receiving	Mario Williams	2 receptions, 18 yards, 1 TD

=== At No. 7 Oklahoma State ===
No.10 Oklahoma Sooners (10–1) vs. No.7 Oklahoma State Cowboys (10–1)

Quarter	1	2	3	4	Total
No. 10 Oklahoma	7	17	9	0	33
No. 7 Oklahoma State	14	10	0	13	37

at Boone Pickens Stadium • Stillwater, OK

- Date: Saturday, November 27, 2021
- Game time: 6:30 p.m. CST
- Game weather: • Sunny Temperature: 57
- Game attendance: 54,990
- Referee: Kevin Hassell
- TV announcers (ABC): Chris Fowler (play-by-play), Kirk Herbstreit (analyst), Holly Rowe (sideline)

Game information

First Quarter

- (10:57) OSU - Spencer Sanders 30 yard pass to Tay Martin, Tanner Brown kick (Drive: 5 plays, 80 yards, 1:29; OSU 7-0)
- (9:08) OKLA - Caleb Williams 11 yard pass to Brian Darby, Gabe Brkic kick (Drive: 5 plays, 75 yards, 1:49; Tied 7-7)
- (7:16) OSU - Tay Martin 4 yard rush, Tanner Brown kick (Drive: 7 plays, 58 yards, 1:44; OSU 14-7)

Second Quarter

- (14:53) OKLA - Caleb Williams 29 yard pass to Austin Stogner, Gabe Brkic kick (Drive: 15 plays, 75 yards, 7:23; Tied 14-14)
- (14:38) OSU - Brennan Presley 100 yard KO, Tanner Brown kick (OSU 21-14)
- (11:05) OKLA - Gabe Brkic 24 yard FG (Drive: 8 plays, 77 yards, 3:29; OSU 21-17)
- (6:25) OSU - Tanner Brown 27 yard FG (Drive: 11 plays, 63 yards, 4:35; OSU 24-17)
- (0:37) OKLA - Caleb Williams 10 yard pass to Brayden Willis, Gabe Brkic kick (Drive: 3 plays, 14 yards, 1:28; Tied 24-24)

Third Quarter

- (12:16) OKLA - Safety (OU 26-24)
- (10:36) OKLA - Justin Broiles fumble recovery, Gabe Brkić kick (Drive: 3 plays, 1 yard, 1:34; OU 33-24)

Fourth Quarter

- (13:52) OSU - Spencer Sanders 37 yard rush, Tanner Brown kick (Drive: 8 plays, 58 yards, 1:25; OU 33-31)
- (8:54) OSU - Jaylen Warren 1 yard rush, 2 Pt pass Failed (Drive: 3 plays, 5 yards, 0:49: OSU 37-33)

Statistics	OKLA	OKST
First downs	21	21
Total yards	441	354
Rushes/yards	44/189	36/140
Passing yards	252	214
Passing: Comp–Att–Int	20-39	19-30-2
Time of possession	35:41	24:02

Team	Category	Player	Statistics
Oklahoma	Passing	Caleb Williams	20/39, 252 yards, 3 TD's
Oklahoma	Rushing	Kennedy Brooks	22 carries, 139 yards
Oklahoma	Receiving	Jeremiah Hall	4 receptions, 76 yards
Oklahoma State	Passing	Spencer Sanders	19/30, 214 yards, 1 TD, 2 INT's
Oklahoma State	Rushing	Spencer Sanders	16 carries, 93 yards, 1 TD
Oklahoma State	Receiving	Tay Martin	7 receptions, 89 yards, 1 TD

=== Vs. Oregon (2021 Alamo Bowl) ===
No.14 Oregon Ducks (10–3) vs. No.16 Oklahoma Sooners (10–2)

Quarter	1	2	3	4	Total
No. 14 Oregon	3	0	22	7	32
No. 16 Oklahoma	6	24	14	3	47

at Alamodome • San Antonio, TX

- Date: Wednesday, December 29th, 2021
- Game time: 8:15 p.m. CST
- Game weather: indoor
- Game attendance: 59,121
- Referee: Mike Roche
- TV announcers (ESPN): Jason Benetti (play-by-play), Andre Ware (analyst) and Paul Carcaterra (sideline)

Game information

First Quarter

- (7:56) OKLA - Kennedy Brooks 16 yard rush, PAT Failed (Drive: 9 plays, 54 yards, 4:31; OU 6-0)
- (1:57) ORE - Camden Lewis 24 yard FG (Drive: 14 plays, 66 yards, 5:59; OU 6-3)

Second Quarter

- (13:15) OKLA - Gabe Brkic 40 yard FG (Drive: 10 plays, 52 yards, 3:42; OU 9-3)
- (10:29) OKLA - Caleb Williams 6 yard pass to Drake Stoops, Gabe Brkic kick (Drive: 4 plays, 48 yards, 1:50; OU 16-3)
- (4:00) OKLA - Caleb Williams 55 yard pass to Marvin Mims, Gabe Brkic kick (Drive: 7 plays, 89 yards, 2:20; OU 23-3)
- (0:36) OKLA - Kennedy Brooks 29 yard rush, Gabe Brkic kick (Drive: 6 plays, 64 yards, 1:17; OU 30-3)

Third Quarter

- (11:35) ORE - Travis Dye 11 yard rush, Kris Hutson PAT rush (Drive: 9 plays, 81 yards, 3:25; OU 30-11)
- (8:38) OKLA - Caleb Williams 6 yard pass to Eric Gray, Gabe Brkic kick (Drive: 6 plays, 76 yards, 2:57; OU 37-11)
- (7:08) ORE - Anthony Brown 66 yard pass to Dont'e Thornton, Camden Lewis kick (Drive: 4 plays, 80 yards, 1:30; OU 37-18)
- (4:55) OKLA - Kennedy Brooks 8 yard rush, Gabe Brkic kick (Drive: 5 plays, 75 yards, 2:13; OU 44-18)
- (0:56) ORE - Anthony Brown 34 yard pass to Kris Hutson, Camden Lewis kick (Drive: 11 plays, 76 yards, 3:59; OU 44-25)

Fourth Quarter

- (8:56) OKLA - Gabe Brkic 29 yard FG (Drive: 12 plays, 53 yards, 7:00; OU 47-25)
- (6:46) ORE - Anthony Brown 30 yard pass to Troy Franklin, Camden Lewis kick (Drive: 6 plays, 75 yards, 2:10; OU 47-32)

Statistics	ORE	OKLA
First downs	26	27
Total yards	497	560
Rushes/yards	33/191	42/318
Passing yards	306	242
Passing: Comp–Att–Int	27-40-1	21-27
Time of possession	26:26	33:34

Team	Category	Player	Statistics
Oregon	Passing	Anthony Brown	27/40, 306 yards, 3 TD's 1 INT
Oregon	Rushing	Travis Dye	18 carries, 153 yards, 1 TD
Oregon	Receiving	Kris Hutson	6 receptions, 55 yards, 1 TD
Oklahoma	Passing	Caleb Williams	21/27, 242 yards, 3 TD's
Oklahoma	Rushing	Kennedy Brooks	14 carries, 142 yards, 3 TD's
Oklahoma	Receiving	Eric Gray	5 receptions, 25 yards, 1 TD

== Statistics ==
=== Scoring ===
==== Scores by quarter (non-conference opponents) ====
	1	2	3	4	Total
All opponents	17	0	14	20	51
Oklahoma	38	51	29	21	139

==== Scores by quarter (Big 12 opponents) ====
	1	2	3	4	Total
Big 12 opponents	49	23	23	28	123
Oklahoma	31	33	48	48	160

==== Scores by quarter (All opponents) ====
	1	2	3	4	Total
All opponents	66	23	37	48	174
Oklahoma	69	84	77	69	299

== Rankings ==
Ranking movements Legend: ██ Increase in ranking ██ Decrease in ranking ( ) = First-place votes
	Week															
Poll	Pre	1	2	3	4	5	6	7	8	9	10	11	12	13	14	Final
AP	2 (6)	4	3	4	6	6	4	3	4	4	4	12	10	13	14	10
Coaches	3 (2)	4	3	3	4	5	3	2	4	4	4	11	9	11	13	10
CFP	Not released									8	8	13	10	14	16	Not released
