= 2021 TCU Horned Frogs football team =

American college football season

2021 TCU Horned Frogs football
- Conference: Big 12 Conference
- Record: 5–7 (3–6 Big 12)
- Head coach: Gary Patterson (21st season; first 8 games); Jerry Kill (interim; remainder of season)
- Offensive coordinator: Doug Meacham (4th season)
- Offensive scheme: Spread
- Defensive coordinator: Chad Glasgow (7th season)
- Base defense: 4–2–5
- Home stadium: Amon G. Carter Stadium

2021 Big 12 Conference football standings
| | Conf. | | | Overall |
| Team | W | | L | W | | L |
|---|---|---|---|---|---|---|
| No. 7 Oklahoma State y | 8 | – | 1 | 12 | – | 2 |
| No. 5 Baylor y$ | 7 | – | 2 | 12 | – | 2 |
| No. 10 Oklahoma | 7 | – | 2 | 11 | – | 2 |
| Iowa State | 5 | – | 4 | 7 | – | 6 |
| Kansas State | 4 | – | 5 | 8 | – | 5 |
| West Virginia | 4 | – | 5 | 6 | – | 7 |
| Texas | 3 | – | 6 | 5 | – | 7 |
| TCU | 3 | – | 6 | 5 | – | 7 |
| Texas Tech | 3 | – | 6 | 7 | – | 6 |
| Kansas | 1 | – | 8 | 2 | – | 10 |
Championship: Baylor 21, Oklahoma State 16
$ – Conference champion; y – Championship game participant; Rankings from AP Poll

The 2021 TCU Horned Frogs football team represented Texas Christian University during the 2021 NCAA Division I FBS football season. The Horned Frogs played their home games at the Amon G. Carter Stadium in Fort Worth, Texas, and competed in the Big 12 Conference. The team was coached by 21st-year head coach Gary Patterson until he left the program after eight games. He was replaced by special assistant coach Jerry Kill on an interim basis.

== Schedule ==
| Date | Time | Opponent | Site | TV | Result | Attendance |
|---|---|---|---|---|---|---|
| September 4 | 7:00 p.m. | Duquesne* | Amon G. Carter Stadium; Fort Worth, TX | ESPN+ | W 45–3 | 35,377 |
| September 11 | 2:30 p.m. | California* | Amon G. Carter Stadium; Fort Worth, TX | ESPNU | W 34–32 | 38,631 |
| September 25 | 11:00 a.m. | SMU* | Amon G. Carter Stadium; Fort Worth, TX (Battle For The Iron Skillet) | FS1 | L 34–42 | 46,672 |
| October 2 | 11:00 a.m. | Texas | Amon G. Carter Stadium; Fort Worth, TX (rivalry) | ABC | L 27–32 | 43,337 |
| October 9 | 6:00 p.m. | at Texas Tech | Jones AT&T Stadium; Lubbock, TX (rivalry) | ESPN | W 52–31 | 55,821 |
| October 16 | 6:30 p.m. | at No. 4 Oklahoma | Gaylord Family Oklahoma Memorial Stadium; Norman, OK | ABC | L 31–52 | 84,391 |
| October 23 | 6:30 p.m. | West Virginia^{†} | Amon G. Carter Stadium; Fort Worth, TX | ESPNU | L 17–29 | 37,288 |
| October 30 | 2:30 p.m. | at Kansas State | Bill Snyder Family Football Stadium; Manhattan, KS | ESPNU | L 12–31 | 44,339 |
| November 6 | 2:30 p.m. | No. 12 Baylor | Amon G. Carter Stadium; Fort Worth, TX (rivalry) | FOX | W 30–28 | 40,338 |
| November 13 | 7:00 p.m. | at No. 10 Oklahoma State | Boone Pickens Stadium; Stillwater, OK | FOX | L 17–63 | 54,549 |
| November 20 | 3:00 p.m. | Kansas | Amon G. Carter Stadium; Fort Worth, TX | ESPN+ | W 31–28 | 35,061 |
| November 26 | 2:30 p.m. | at Iowa State | Jack Trice Stadium; Ames, IA | FS1 | L 14–48 | 57,775 |
*Non-conference game; ^{†}Homecoming; Rankings from AP Poll and CFP Rankings after November 2 released prior to game; All times are in Central time

== Game summaries ==
=== Vs. Duquesne ===
Duquesne Dukes (0–0) vs. TCU Horned Frogs (0–0)

| Quarter | 1 | 2 | 3 | 4 | Total |
|---|---|---|---|---|---|
| Duquesne | 0 | 0 | 3 | 0 | 3 |
| TCU | 21 | 14 | 3 | 7 | 45 |

at Amon G. Carter Stadium • Fort Worth, TX

- Date: Saturday, September 4, 2021
- Game time: 7:00 p.m. CDT
- Game weather: sunny • Temperature: 94°F
- Game attendance: 35,377
- Referee: Scott Campbell
- TV announcers (ESPN+): Chuckie Kempf, Ryan Leaf

Game information

First Quarter

- (9:12) TCU – Max Duggan 8 yard run, Griffin Kell kick (Drive: 13 plays, 90 yards, 5:39; TCU 7–0)
- (5:31) TCU – Emari Demercado 2 yard run, Griffin Kell kick (Drive: 4 plays, 60 yards, 2:11; TCU 14–0)
- (1:28) TCU – Zach Evans 2 yard run, Griffin Kell kick (Drive: 6 plays, 49 yards, 3:05; TCU 21–0)

Second Quarter

- (8:00) TCU – Kendre Miller 5 yard run, Griffin Kell kick (Drive: 4 plays, 30 yards, 1:28; TCU 28–0)
- (0:51) TCU – JD Spielman 16 yard pass from Max Duggan, Griffin Kell kick (Drive: 9 plays, 52 yards, 3:41; TCU 35–0)

Third Quarter

- (8:19) DUQ – Brian Bruzdewicz 26 yard field goal (Drive: 8 plays, 57 yards, 3:41; TCU 35–3)
- (1:43) TCU – Griffin Kell 18 yard field goal (Drive: 12 plays, 47 yards, 6:25; TCU 38–3)

Fourth Quarter

- (4:20) TCU – Blake Nowell 20 yard pass from Chandler Morris, Griffin Kell kick (Drive: 1 play, 20 yards, 0:08; TCU 45–3)

| Statistics | DUQ | TCU |
|---|---|---|
| First downs | 6 | 26 |
| Total yards | 137 | 431 |
| Rushes/yards | 29/61 | 38/178 |
| Passing yards | 76 | 253 |
| Passing: Comp–Att–Int | 3–12–1 | 18–24–1 |
| Time of possession | 29:19 | 30:41 |

| Team | Category | Player | Statistics |
|---|---|---|---|
| Duquesne | Passing | Darius Perrantes | 3–9, 76 yards |
| Duquesne | Rushing | Garrett Owens | 14 carries, 35 yards |
| Duquesne | Receiving | Cyrus Holder | 2 receptions, 64 yards |
| TCU | Passing | Max Duggan | 14–19, 207 yards, 1 TD, 1 INT |
| TCU | Rushing | Kendre Miller | 8 carries, 54 yards, 1 TD |
| TCU | Receiving | Derius Davis | 2 receptions, 57 yards |

=== Vs. California ===
California Golden Bears vs TCU Horned Frogs – Game summary

| Quarter | 1 | 2 | 3 | 4 | Total |
|---|---|---|---|---|---|
| Golden Bears | 6 | 13 | 0 | 13 | 32 |
| Horned Frogs | 0 | 14 | 7 | 13 | 34 |

at Amon G. Carter Stadium • Fort Worth, TX

- Date: September 11, 2021
- Game time: 1:30 p.m. CDT
- Game weather: Temperature: 90 °F (32 °C) • Weather: Sunny
- Game attendance: 38,631
- Referee: Michael Vandervelde
- TV announcers (ESPNU): Kevin Brown, Hutson Mason

Game information

First quarter

Second quarter

Third quarter

Fourth quarter

Top Passers

Top Rushers

Top Receivers

=== Vs. SMU ===
Southern Methodist at Texas Christian

| Team | 1 | 2 | 3 | 4 | Total |
|---|---|---|---|---|---|
| • Mustangs | 14 | 7 | 14 | 7 | 42 |
| Horned Frogs | 14 | 7 | 6 | 7 | 34 |

- Date: September 25
- Location: Amon G. Carter Stadium
  Fort Worth, TX
- Game start: 11:03 a.m. CDT
- Elapsed time: 3 hours and 18 minutes
- Game attendance: 46,672
- Game weather: Temperature: 78 °F (26 °C) • Weather: Sunny • Wind: SW 2 MPH
- Referee: Charles Lamertina
- TV announcers (FS1): Dan Hellie (play–by–play) and Robert Smith (analyst)

Scoring summary
| 1 | 14:08 | SMU | Danny Gray 68-yard pass from Tanner Mordecai (Blake Mazza PAT failed) (3 plays, 77 yards, 0:46) | SMU 6–0 |
| 1 | 10:48 | TCU | Kendre Miller 20-yard rush (Griffin Kell kick) (6 plays, 54 yards, 3:12) | TCU 7–6 |
| 1 | 08:44 | SMU | Tanner Mordecai 4-yard rush (Ben Redding two-point conversion rush) (6 plays, 75 yards, 2:04) | SMU 14–7 |
| 1 | 07:14 | TCU | Derius Davis 13-yard pass from Max Duggan (Griffin Kell kick) (3 plays, 75 yards, 1:30) | TIE 14–14 |
| 2 | 13:31 | TCU | Zach Evans 46-yard pass from Max Duggan (Griffin Kell kick) (6 plays, 86 yards, 2:23) | TCU 21–14 |
| 2 | 10:49 | SMU | Reggie Roberson Jr. 29-yard pass from Tanner Mordecai (Blake Mazza kick) (7 plays, 75 yards, 2:42) | TIE 21–21 |
| 3 | 14:19 | SMU | Ulysses Bentley IV 1-yard rush (Blake Mazza kick) (2 plays, 3 yards, 0:25) | SMU 28–21 |
| 3 | 10:27 | TCU | Griffin Kell 40-yard field goal (8 plays, 43 yards, 3:45) | SMU 28–24 |
| 3 | 07:09 | SMU | Rashee Rice 11-yard pass from Tanner Mordecai (Blake Mazza kick) (8 plays, 75 yards, 3:18) | SMU 35–24 |
| 3 | 00:22 | TCU | Griffin Kell 30-yard field goal (4 plays, 3 yards, 1:00) | SMU 35–27 |
| 4 | 12:19 | SMU | Jordan Kerley 26-yard pass from Tanner Mordecai (Blake Mazza kick) (7 plays, 75 yards, 3:03) | SMU 42–27 |
| 4 | 04:05 | TCU | Taye Barber 21-yard pass from Max Duggan (Griffin Kell kick) (7 plays, 91 yards, 1:45) | SMU 42–34 |

| Statistics | SMU | TCU |
|---|---|---|
| First downs | 29 | 20 |
| Total yards | 595 | 446 |
| Rushing yards | 350 | 170 |
| Passing yards | 245 | 276 |
| Turnovers | 3 | 1 |
| Time of possession | 33:52 | 26:08 |

| Team | Category | Player | Statistics |
|---|---|---|---|
| SMU | Passing | Tanner Mordecai | 17/28, 245 yards, 4 TD, 3 INT |
| SMU | Rushing | Ulysses Bentley IV | 20 rushes, 153 yards, TD |
| SMU | Receiving | Danny Gray | 4 receptions, 130 yards, TD |
| TCU | Passing | Max Duggan | 16/28, 276 yards, 3 TD |
| TCU | Rushing | Zach Evans | 15 rushes, 113 yards |
| TCU | Receiving | Taye Barber | 5 receptions, 114 yards, TD |

=== Vs. Texas ===
| Team | 1 | 2 | 3 | 4 | Total |
|---|---|---|---|---|---|
| • Texas | 13 | 10 | 3 | 6 | 32 |
| TCU | 14 | 3 | 3 | 7 | 27 |

- Date: October 2
- Location: Amon G. Carter Stadium (Fort Worth, TX)
- Game start: 11:00 a.m.
- Game attendance: 43,337
- Game weather: 75, Cloudy, Wind SW @ 6 mph
- Referee: Tuta Salaam
- TV announcers (ABC): Dave Pasch (play-by-play), Dusty Dvoracek (color), and Tom Luginbill (sideline)

| Statistics | Texas | TCU |
|---|---|---|
| First downs | 25 | 23 |
| Total yards | 414 | 351 |
| Rushing yards | 272 | 169 |
| Passing yards | 142 | 182 |
| Turnovers | 1 | 3 |
| Time of possession | 32:41 | 27:10 |

| Team | Category | Player | Statistics |
|---|---|---|---|
| Texas | Passing | Casey Thompson | 12–22, 142 yards, 1 TDs, 1 INT |
| Texas | Rushing | Bijan Robinson | 35 carries, 216 yards, 2 TDs |
| Texas | Receiving | Jordan Whittington | 3 receptions, 79 yards, 1 TDs |
| TCU | Passing | Max Duggan | 20–28, 182 yards, 1 TDs, 0 INT |
| TCU | Rushing | Zach Evans | 15 carries, 113 yards, 1 TDs |
| TCU | Receiving | Taye Barber | 3 receptions, 37 yards, 0 TDs |

=== At Texas Tech ===
TCU Horned Frogs at Texas Tech Red Raiders – Game summary

| Quarter | 1 | 2 | 3 | 4 | Total |
|---|---|---|---|---|---|
| Horned Frogs | 14 | 21 | 10 | 7 | 52 |
| Red Raiders | 7 | 3 | 14 | 7 | 31 |

at Jones AT&T Stadium, Lubbock, Texas

- Date: October 9
- Game time: 6:00 p.m.
- Game weather: Temperature: 94 °F (34 °C) • Weather: Sunny • Wind: SW 18 MPH
- Game attendance: 55,821
- Referee: Brandon Cruse
- TV announcers (ESPN): Mark Jones (play-by-play), Robert Griffin III (analyst) and Quint Kessenich (sideline)

Game information

First quarter

- TCU – Quincy Brown 4-yard pass from Max Duggan (Griffin Kell kick), 11:46. Horned Frogs 7–0. Drive: 7 plays, 75 yards, 3:14.
- TCU – Kendre Miller 33-yard run (Griffin Kell kick), 6:29. Horned Frogs 14–0. Drive: 8 plays, 79 yards, 4:06.
- TTU – SaRodorick Thompson 4-yard run (Jonathan Garibay kick), 2:26. Horned Frogs 14–7. Drive: 8 plays, 75 yards, 4:03.

Second quarter

- TCU – Zach Evans 7-yard run (Griffin Kell kick), 14:55. Horned Frogs 21–7. Drive: 6 plays, 75 yards, 2:31.
- TCU – Tre-Vius Hodges-Tomlinson 29-yard interception return (Griffin Kell kick), 14:46. Horned Frogs 28–7.
- TTU – Jonathan Garibay 38-yard field goal, 8:12. Horned Frogs 28–10. Drive: 15 plays, 55 yards, 6:34.
- TCU – Zach Evans 1-yard run (Griffin Kell kick), 1:35. Horned Frogs 35–10. Drive: 14 plays, 75 yards, 6:37.

Third quarter

- TCU – Griffin Kell 48-yard field goal, 10:05. Horned Frogs 38–10. Drive: 7 plays, 33 yards, 3:01.
- TTU – SaRodorick Thompson 1-yard run (Jonathan Garibay kick), 7:31. Horned Frogs 38–17. Drive: 4 plays, 75 yards, 1:34.
- TCU – Kendre Miller 75-yard run (Griffin Kell kick), 7:18. Horned Frogs 45–17. Drive: 1 play, 75 yards, 0:13.
- TTU – Xavier White 4-yard run (Jonathan Garibay kick), 5:58. Horned Frogs 45–24. Drive: 3 plays, 75 yards, 1:20.

Fourth quarter

- TTU – SaRodorick Thompson 6-yard run (Jonathan Garibay kick), 5:00. Horned Frogs 45–31. Drive: 13 plays, 68 yards, 3:46.
- TCU – Kendre Miller 45-yard run (Griffin Kell kick), 4:51. Horned Frogs 52–31. Drive: 1 play, 45 yards, 0:09.

Top passers

- TCU – Max Duggan – 8/10, 104 yards, TD
- TTU – Henry Colombi – 23/41, 344 yards, INT

Top rushers

- TCU – Kendre Miller – 12 rushes, 185 yards, 3 TD
- TTU – SaRodorick Thompson – 18 rushes, 118 yards, 3 TD

Top receivers

- TCU – Blair Conwright – 3 receptions, 46 yards
- TTU – Kaylon Geiger – 6 receptions, 99 yards

=== At No. 4 Oklahoma ===
TCU Horned Frogs (3–2) vs. No. 4 Oklahoma Sooners (6–0)

| Quarter | 1 | 2 | 3 | 4 | Total |
|---|---|---|---|---|---|
| TCU | 7 | 7 | 10 | 7 | 31 |
| No. 4 Oklahoma | 14 | 10 | 21 | 7 | 52 |

at Gaylord Family Oklahoma Memorial Stadium • Norman, OK

- Date: Saturday, October 16, 2021
- Game time: 6:30 p.m. CDT
- Game weather: • Sunny Temperature: 65
- Game attendance: 84,391
- Referee: Kevin Mar
- TV announcers (ABC): Chris Fowler (play-by-play), Kirk Herbstreit (analyst) and Holly Rowe (sideline)

Game information

First Quarter

- (12:01) OKLA - Kennedy Brooks 2 yard rush, Gabe Brkic kick (Drive: 7 plays, 75 yards, 2:59; OU 7-0)
- (05:40) OKLA - Caleb Williams 17 yard pass to Jeremiah Hall, Gabe Brkic kick (Drive: 7 plays, 62 yards, 4:24; OU 14-0)
- (3:43) TCU - Max Duggan 53 yard pass to Kendre Miller, Griffin Kell kick (Drive: 5 plays, 75 yards, 1:57; OU 14-7)

Second Quarter

- (11:13) OKLA - Gabe Brkic 28 yard FG (Drive: 6 plays, 59 yards, 2:37; OU 17-7)
- (4:27) TCU - Max Duggan 20 yard pass to Quentin Johnston, Griffin Kell kick (Drive: 14 plays, 78 yards, 6:38; OU 17-14)
- (0:20) OKLA - Caleb Williams 11 yard pass to Jadon Haselwood, Gabe Brkic kick (Drive: 5 plays, 76 yards, 1:23; OU 24-14)

Third Quarter

- (11:48) OKLA - Caleb Williams 16 yard pass to Jadon Haselwood, Gabe Brkic kick (Drive: 3 plays, 77 yards, 1:33; OU 31-14)
- (11:01) TCU - Max Duggan 75 yard pass to Quentin Johnston, Griffin Kell kick (Drive: 2 plays, 80 yards, 00:42; OU 31-21)
- (9:21) OKLA - Caleb Williams 7 yard pass to Jadon Haselwood, Gabe Brkic kick (Drive: 3 plays, 33 yards, 1:40; OU 38-21)
- (4:38) TCU - Griffin Kell 22 yard FG (Drive: 12 plays, 71 yards, 4:43; OU 38-24)
- (2:20) OKLA - Caleb Williams 41 yard rush, Gabe Brkic kick (Drive: 5 plays, 75 yards, 2:18; OU 45-24)

Fourth Quarter

- (11:16) TCU - Max Duggan 25 yard pass to Quentin Johnston, Griffin Kell kick (Drive: 4 plays, 47 yards, 1:44; OU 45-31)
- (1:09) OKLA - Eric Gray 2 yard rush, Gabe Brkic kick (Drive: 9 plays, 68 yards, 5:44; OU 52-31)

| Statistics | TCU | OKLA |
|---|---|---|
| First downs | 21 | 25 |
| Total yards | 519 | 525 |
| Rushes/yards | 37-183 | 35-230 |
| Passing yards | 336 | 295 |
| Passing: Comp–Att–Int | 20-36 | 18-23 |
| Time of possession | 29:13 | 30:47 |

| Team | Category | Player | Statistics |
|---|---|---|---|
| TCU | Passing | Max Duggan | 20/32, 336 yards, 4 TD's |
| TCU | Rushing | Emari Demercado | 7 carries, 57 yards |
| TCU | Receiving | Quentin Johnston | 7 receptions, 185 yards, 3 TD's |
| Oklahoma | Passing | Caleb Williams | 18/23, 295 yards, 4 TD's |
| Oklahoma | Rushing | Kennedy Brooks | 20 carries, 153 yards, 1 TD |
| Oklahoma | Receiving | Jadon Haselwood | 6 receptions, 56 yards, 3 TD's |

=== Vs. West Virginia ===
West Virginia Mountaineers (2–4) vs. TCU Horned Frogs (3–3)

| Quarter | 1 | 2 | 3 | 4 | Total |
|---|---|---|---|---|---|
| West Virginia | 10 | 10 | 3 | 6 | 29 |
| TCU | 7 | 10 | 0 | 0 | 17 |

at Amon G. Carter Stadium • Fort Worth, TX

- Date: Saturday, October 23, 2021
- Game time: 6:30 p.m. CDT
- Game weather: sunny • Temperature: 85°F • Wind: SE 16mph
- Game attendance: 37,288
- Referee: David Alvarez
- TV announcers (ESPNU): Brian Custer and Kelly Stouffer

Game information

First Quarter

- (14:46) TCU – Derius Davis 100-yard kickoff return, Griffin Kell kick (TCU 7–0)
- (10:57) WVU – Casey Legg 27-yard field goal (Drive: 9 plays, 79 yards, 3:44; TCU 7–3)
- (0:07) WVU – Leddie Brown 5-yard run, Casey Legg kick (Drive: 15 plays, 94 yards, 7:47; WVU 10–7)

Second Quarter

- (9:07) WVU – Casey Legg 38-yard field goal (Drive: 6 plays, 71 yards, 3:20; WVU 13–7)
- (5:17) TCU – Taye Barber 5-yard pass from Max Duggan, Griffin Kell kick (Drive: 9 plays, 76 yards, 3:48; TCU 14–13)
- (2:51) WVU – Leddie Brown 1-yard run, Casey Legg kick (Drive: 6 plays, 65 yards, 2:26; WVU 20–14)
- (0:14) TCU – Griffin Kell 24-yard field goal (Drive: 9 plays, 68 yards, 2:34; WVU 20–17)

Third Quarter

- (3:56) WVU – Casey Legg 48-yard field goal (Drive: 5 plays, 10 yards, 2:50; WVU 23–17)

Fourth Quarter

- (12:26) WVU – Leddie Brown 3-yard run, Mike O'Laughlin pass failed (Drive: 3 plays, 15 yards, 1:19; WVU 29–17)

| Statistics | WVU | TCU |
|---|---|---|
| First downs | 24 | 19 |
| Total yards | 487 | 393 |
| Rushes/yards | 41/229 | 34/149 |
| Passing yards | 258 | 244 |
| Passing: Comp–Att–Int | 22–29–0 | 16–26–2 |
| Time of possession | 35:30 | 24:30 |

| Team | Category | Player | Statistics |
|---|---|---|---|
| West Virginia | Passing | Jarret Doege | 21–28, 257 yards |
| West Virginia | Rushing | Leddie Brown | 24 carries, 111 yards, 3 TD |
| West Virginia | Receiving | Sean Ryan | 4 receptions, 81 yards |
| TCU | Passing | Max Duggan | 16–26, 244 yards, 1 TD, 2 INT |
| TCU | Rushing | Zach Evans | 18 carries, 62 yards |
| TCU | Receiving | Quentin Johnston | 5 receptions, 113 yards |

=== At Kansas State ===
| Team | 1 | 2 | 3 | 4 | Total |
|---|---|---|---|---|---|
| TCU | 0 | 5 | 7 | 0 | 12 |
| • Kansas State | 7 | 14 | 10 | 0 | 31 |

- Date: October 30
- Location: Manhattan, KS
- Game start: 2:30 pm
- Game attendance: 44,339
- Game weather: 69 degrees, 8 mph, SW, Sunny
- Referee: Michael Vandervelde
- TV announcers (ESPNU): Mike Couzens, Dustin Fox
- Sources: ESPN box score ESPN team stats

| Statistics | TCU | Kansas State |
|---|---|---|
| First downs | 17 | 16 |
| Total yards | 340 | 388 |
| Rushing yards | 156 | 146 |
| Passing yards | 184 | 242 |
| Turnovers | 2 | 1 |
| Time of possession | 30:44 | 29:16 |

| Team | Category | Player | Statistics |
|---|---|---|---|
| TCU | Passing | Chandler Morris | 9/14, 111 yards, 0 TD, 0 INT |
| TCU | Rushing | Kendre Miller | 14 for 102 yards, 0 TD, 61 long |
| TCU | Receiving | Derius Davis | 4 for 78 yards, 0 TD, 30 long |
| Kansas State | Passing | Skylar Thompson | 13/21 for 242 yards, 1 TD, 1 INT |
| Kansas State | Rushing | Deuce Vaughn | 20 for 109 yards, 2 TFD, 42 long |
| Kansas State | Receiving | Daniel Imatorbhebhe | 2 for 90 yards, 1 TD, 73 long |

Wildcat Felix Anudike-Uzomah set a new school and Big 12 record six sacks while also tying the NCAA single-game record. TCU had two opportunities to score inside the 5 yard line, but the Kansas State defense held—the first time for the year that the Horned Frogs did not score while in the red zone.

Kansas State took the lead in the first quarter and held it for the entire game. TCU managed to pull within 7-3 in the second quarter, but Kansas State made it 14-3 on the next series with a 42-yard run by Deuce Vaughn.

TCU managed a safety and also produced some quality plays, including Kendre Miller on a 61-yard carry to the 2-yard line—but TCU could not complete the final two yards in four plays for a score. Their only score by the offense was a field goal. TCU did hold Kansas State scoreless in the third quarter.

On Sunday after the game, TCU fired head coach Gary Patterson and will have Jerry Kill take over on an interim basis.

=== Vs. No. 12 Baylor ===
No. 12 Baylor Bears (7–1) vs. TCU Horned Frogs (3–5)

| Quarter | 1 | 2 | 3 | 4 | Total |
|---|---|---|---|---|---|
| No. 12 Baylor | 7 | 7 | 7 | 7 | 28 |
| TCU | 7 | 9 | 7 | 7 | 30 |

at Amon G. Carter Stadium • Fort Worth, TX

- Date: Saturday, November 6, 2021
- Game time: 2:30 p.m. CDT
- Game weather: sunny • Temperature: 67°F
- Game attendance: 40,338
- Referee: Tuta Salaam
- TV announcers (FOX): Tim Brando (play-by-play) and Spencer Tillman (analyst)

Game information

First Quarter

- (10:53) BU – Tyquan Thornton 7 yard pass from Gerry Bohanon, Isaiah Hankins kick (Drive: 3 plays, 62 yards, 1:14; BU 7–0)
- (6:59) TCU – Chandler Morris 12 yard run, Griffin Kell kick (Drive: 4 plays, 82 yards, 1:38; 7–7)

Second Quarter

- (13:29) TCU – Griffin Kell 30 yard field goal (Drive: 11 plays, 64 yards, 5:19; TCU 10–7)
- (9:16) TCU – Griffin Kell 46 yard field goal (Drive: 7 plays, 10 yards, 1:55; TCU 13–7)
- (2:57) BU – Drake Dabney 21 yard pass from Gerry Bohanon, Isaiah Hankins kick (Drive: 11 plays, 75 yards, 6:19; BU 14–13)
- (0:59) TCU – Griffin Kell 24 yard field goal (Drive: 10 plays, 68 yards, 1:58; TCU 16–14)

Third Quarter

- (7:07) TCU – Dominic DiNunzio 5 yard pass from Chandler Morris, Griffin Kell kick (Drive: 12 plays, 83 yards, 6:16; TCU 23–14)
- (3:01) BU – Trestan Ebner 1 yard run, Isaiah Hankins kick (Drive: 7 plays, 75 yards, 4:06; TCU 23–21)

Fourth Quarter

- (11:59) TCU – Quentin Johnston 19 yard pass from Chandler Morris, Griffin Kell kick (Drive: 12 plays, 80 yards, 4:02; TCU 30–21)
- (5:04) BU – Tyquan Thornton 4 yard pass from Gerry Bohanon, Isaiah Hankins kick (Drive: 13 plays, 86 yards, 6:44; TCU 30–28)

| Statistics | BU | TCU |
|---|---|---|
| First downs | 17 | 27 |
| Total yards | 393 | 562 |
| Rushes/yards | 36/179 | 35/94 |
| Passing yards | 214 | 468 |
| Passing: Comp–Att–Int | 14–20–2 | 30–42–0 |
| Time of possession | 29:36 | 30:24 |

| Team | Category | Player | Statistics |
|---|---|---|---|
| Baylor | Passing | Gerry Bohanon | 14–20, 214 yards, 3 TD, 2 INT |
| Baylor | Rushing | Abram Smith | 18 carries, 125 yards |
| Baylor | Receiving | Tyquan Thornton | 5 receptions, 121 yards, 2 TD |
| TCU | Passing | Chandler Morris | 29–41, 461 yards, 2 TD |
| TCU | Rushing | Chandler Morris | 11 carries, 70 yards, 1 TD |
| TCU | Receiving | Quentin Johnston | 5 receptions, 142 yards, 1 TD |

=== At No. 10 Oklahoma State ===
TCU Horned Frogs (4–5) vs. No. 10 Oklahoma State Cowboys (8–1)

| Quarter | 1 | 2 | 3 | 4 | Total |
|---|---|---|---|---|---|
| TCU | 3 | 0 | 0 | 14 | 17 |
| No. 10 Oklahoma State | 7 | 21 | 14 | 21 | 63 |

at Boone Pickens Stadium • Stillwater, OK

- Date: Saturday, November 13, 2021
- Game time: 7:00 p.m. CST
- Game weather: Cloudy • Temperature: 51 °F (11 °C)
- Game attendance: 54,549
- Referee: Derek Anderson
- TV announcers (FOX): Tim Brando and Spencer Tillman

Game information

First Quarter

- (5:01) OSU – Jalen Warren 1 yard rush, Tanner Brown kick (Drive: 11 plays, 68 yards, 3:16; OSU 7–0)
- (2:03) TCU – Griffin Kell 44 yard FG (Drive: 6 plays, 48 yards, 2:58; OSU 7–3)

Second Quarter

- (14:55) OSU – Jaylen Warren 6 yard rush, Tanner Brown kick (Drive: 7 plays, 69 yards, 2:01; OSU 14–3)
- (5:04) OSU – Jaylen Warren 2 yard rush, Tanner Brown kick (Drive: 13 plays, 84 yards, 5:36; OSU 21–3)
- (1:42) OSU – Spencer Sanders 46 yard pass to Blaine Green, Tanner Brown kick (Drive: 4 plays, 89 yards, 1:03; OSU 28–3)

Third Quarter

- (9:07) OSU – Dezmon Jackson 5 yard rush, Tanner Brown kick (Drive: 10 plays, 63 yards, 3:56; OSU 35–3)
- (3:17) OSU – Dominic Richardson 2 yard rush, Tanner Brown kick (Drive: 10 plays, 78 yards, 4:46; OSU 42–3)

Fourth Quarter

- (13:27) OSU – Dezmon Jackson 1 yard rush, Tanner Brown kick (Drive: 9 plays, 55 yards, 3:42; OSU 49–3)
- (12:37) TCU – Emari Demercado 13 yard rush, Griffin Kell kick (Drive: 2 plays, 75 yards, 0:50; OSU 49–10)
- (11:49) TCU – Colt Ellison 28 yard fumble recovery, kick failed (OSU 49–16)
- (8:32) OSU – Dominic Richardson 20 yard rush, Alex Hale kick (Drive: 6 plays, 75 yards, 3:17; OSU 56–16)
- (5:04) OSU – Jaden Nixon 63 yard rush, Alex Hale kick (Drive: 3 plays, 69 yards, 1:35; OSU 63–16)

| Statistics | TCU | OKST |
|---|---|---|
| First downs | 12 | 37 |
| Total yards | 273 | 682 |
| Rushes/yards | 32/108 | 63/447 |
| Passing yards | 165 | 235 |
| Passing: Comp–Att–Int | 12–21 | 17–25 |
| Time of possession | 24:42 | 33:02 |

| Team | Category | Player | Statistics |
|---|---|---|---|
| TCU | Passing | Chandler Morris | 11/20, 103 yards |
| TCU | Rushing | Emari Demercado | 14 carries, 90 yards, 1 TD |
| TCU | Receiving | Taye Barber | 3 receptions, 74 yards |
| Oklahoma State | Passing | Spencer Sanders | 17/25, 235 yards, 1 TD |
| Oklahoma State | Rushing | Dominic Richardson | 12 carries, 134 yards, 2 TD's |
| Oklahoma State | Receiving | Brennan Presley | 6 receptions, 61 yards |

=== Vs. Kansas ===
Kansas Jayhawks vs. TCU Horned Frogs

| Quarter | 1 | 2 | 3 | 4 | Total |
|---|---|---|---|---|---|
| Kansas | 7 | 7 | 0 | 14 | 28 |
| TCU | 7 | 0 | 14 | 10 | 31 |

at Amon G. Carter Stadium • Fort Worth, TX

- Date: Saturday, November 20, 2021
- Game time: 3:00 pm CDT
- Game weather: Sunny • Temperature: 73 °F (23 °C)
- Game attendance: 35,061
- Referee: Kevin Hassell
- TV announcers (ESPN+): Courtney Lyle, Ryan Leaf

Game information

First quarter

- (10:33) TCU – Derius Davis 43 yard run, Griffin Kell kick good (Drive: 5 plays 83 yards, 2:23; TCU 7–0)
- (5:43) KU – Jalon Daniels 14 yard run, Jacob Borcila kick good (Drive: 9 plays 75 yards, 4:50; 7–7)

Second quarter

- (12:29) KU – Devin Neal 2 yard run, Jacob Borcila kick good (Drive: 8 plays 82 yards, 4:13; KU 14–7)

Third quarter

- (13:32) TCU – Kendre Miller 56 yard run, Griffin Kell kick good (Drive: 3 plays 65 yards, 1:25; 14–14)
- (6:55) TCU – Max Duggan 1 yard run, Griffin Kell kick good (Drive: 10 plays 74 yards, 4:40; TCU 21–14)

Fourth quarter

- (11:43) TCU – Emari Demercado 1 yard run, Griffin Kell kick good (Drive: 12 plays 99 yards, 6:44; TCU 28–14)
- (9:23) KU – Jalon Daniels 23 yard pass to Luke Grimm, Jacob Borcila kick good (Drive: 5 plays 74 yards, 2:14; TCU 28–21)
- (4:46) KU – Jalon Daniels 10 yard pass to Jared Casey, Jacob Borcila kick good (Drive: 8 plays 65 yards; 3:13 28–28)
- (0:06) TCU – Griffin Kell 25 yard field goal (Drive: 14 plays 67 yards, 4:40; TCU 31–28)

| Statistics | KU | TCU |
|---|---|---|
| First downs | 21 | 19 |
| Total yards | 379 | 492 |
| Rush yards | 124 | 326 |
| Passing yards | 255 | 166 |
| Turnovers | 1 | 2 |
| Time of possession | 29:49 | 30:11 |

| Team | Category | Player | Statistics |
|---|---|---|---|
| Kansas | Passing | Jalon Daniels | 22/30 255 yards 2 TD 1 INT |
| Kansas | Rushing | Devin Neal | 14 carries 59 yards 1 TD |
| Kansas | Receiving | Kwamie Lassiter II | 8 receptions 101 yards |
| TCU | Passing | Max Duggan | 10/16 166 yards 1 INT |
| TCU | Rushing | Kendre Miller | 12 carries 112 yards 1 TD |
| TCU | Receiving | Derius Davis | 6 receptions 103 yards |

=== At Iowa State ===
TCU Horned Frogs (5–6) vs. Iowa State Cyclones (6–5)

| Quarter | 1 | 2 | 3 | 4 | Total |
|---|---|---|---|---|---|
| TCU | 0 | 7 | 0 | 7 | 14 |
| Iowa State | 3 | 14 | 10 | 21 | 48 |

at Jack Trice Stadium • Ames, Iowa

- Date: Friday, November 25, 2021
- Game time: 3:30 p.m. CDT
- Game weather: Clear• Temperature: 30°F
- Game attendance: 57,775
- Referee: Scott Campbell
- TV announcers (FS1): Chris Vosters (pxp), Devin Gardner (analyst)

Game information

First Quarter

- (10:33) ISU – Andrew Mevis 27 Yd Field Goal(Drive: 9 plays, 50 yards, 4:27; ISU 3–0)

Second Quarter

- (13:12) ISU – Jirehl Brock 40 Yd Run (Connor Assalley Kick)(Drive: 5 plays, 80 yards, 1:42; ISU 10–0)
- (03:35) ISU – Breece Hall 39 Yd Run (Andrew Mevis Kick)(Drive: 7 plays, 86 yards, 3:08; ISU 17–0)
- (01:33) TCU – Blair Conwright 47 Yd pass from Max Duggan (Griffin Kell Kick)(Drive: 6 plays, 75 yards, 2:02; ISU 17–7)

Third Quarter

- (10:25) ISU – Breece Hall 22 Yd pass from Brock Purdy (Connor Assalley Kick)(Drive: 3 plays, 38 yards, 1:14; ISU 24–7)
- (02:31) ISU – Andrew Mevis 32 Yd Field Goal(Drive: 10 plays, 42 yards, 5:09; ISU 27–7)

Fourth Quarter

- (12:56) ISU – Breece Hall 80 Yd Run (Andrew Mevis Kick)(Drive: 1 play, 80 yards, 0:15; ISU 34–7)
- (10:54) TCU – Tyler Guyton 6 Yd pass from Max Duggan (Griffin Kell Kick)(Drive: 4 plays, 19 yards, 1:49; ISU 34–14)
- (08:53) ISU – Breece Hall 4 Yd Run (Connor Assalley Kick)(Drive: 4 plays, 75 yards, 1:55; ISU 41–14)
- (04:48) ISU – Chase Allen 35 Yd pass from Brock Purdy (Andrew Mevis Kick)(Drive: 4 plays, 67 yards, 1:57; ISU 48–14)

| Statistics | TCU | ISU |
|---|---|---|
| First downs | 18 | 22 |
| Total yards | 348 | 541 |
| Rushes/yards | 39/132 | 23/279 |
| Passing yards | 216 | 262 |
| Passing: Comp–Att–Int | 15–26–1 | 21–30–0 |
| Turnovers | 1 | 0 |
| Time of possession | 34:35 | 25:25 |

| Team | Category | Player | Statistics |
|---|---|---|---|
| TCU | Passing | Max Duggan | 15-26, 216 YDS, 2 TD, 1 INT |
| TCU | Rushing | Emari Demercado | 15 CAR, 65 YDS |
| TCU | Receiving | Derius Davis | 4 REC, 63 YDS |
| Iowa State | Passing | Brock Purdy | 21-30, 262 YDS, 2 TD |
| Iowa State | Rushing | Breece Hall | 18 CAR, 242 YDS, 3 TD |
| Iowa State | Receiving | Xavier Hutchinson | 7 REC, 107 YDS |

== Rankings ==
Ranking movements Legend: RV = Received votes
| | Week | | | | | | | | | | | | | | | |
| Poll | Pre | 1 | 2 | 3 | 4 | 5 | 6 | 7 | 8 | 9 | 10 | 11 | 12 | 13 | 14 | Final |
|---|---|---|---|---|---|---|---|---|---|---|---|---|---|---|---|---|
| AP | RV | RV | | | | | | | | | | | | | | |
| Coaches | RV | RV | | | | | | | | | | | | | | |
| CFP | Not released | | | | | | | | | | | | | | | Not released |

== Coaching staff ==
| Coach | Title | Year at TCU | Previous job |
|---|---|---|---|
| Gary Patterson | Head coach | 23rd (fired mid season) | New Mexico (DC/S) |
| Doug Meacham | OC/WR/TE | 5th | St. Louis BattleHawks (OC) |
| Chad Glasgow | DC/LB | 20th | Texas Tech (DC) |
| Bryan Applewhite | RB | 2nd | Colorado State (RB) |
| Jarrett Anderson | OL | 24th | Tyler Junior College (RB/WR) |
| Zarnell Fitch | DL | 8th | Lincoln High School (HC) |
| Paul Gonzales | S | 10th | Pacific University (DB) |
| Kenny Hill | QB | 3rd | None |
| Malcolm Kelly | WR | 3rd | Houston (offensive analyst) |
| Jeremy Modkins | CB | 15th | None |
| Dan Sharp | DL | 30th | Tulsa (TE/ST) |
| Jerry Kill | Special assistant (Interim Head Coach) | 2nd | Virginia Tech (HC) |
