= Spencer Rattler =

American football player (born 2000)

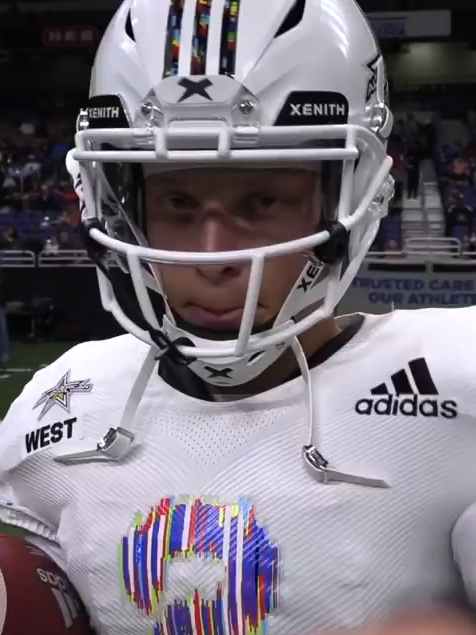
- Rattler in 2019

No. 2 – New Orleans Saints
- Position: Quarterback
- Roster status: Active

Personal information
- Born: September 28, 2000 (age 26); Phoenix, Arizona, U.S.
- Listed height: 5 ft 11 in (1.80 m)
- Listed weight: 210 lb (95 kg)

Career information
- High school: Pinnacle (Phoenix)
- College: Oklahoma (2019–2021); South Carolina (2022–2023)
- NFL draft: 2024: 5th round, 150th overall pick

Career history
- New Orleans Saints (2024–present)

Awards and highlights
- First-team All-Big 12 (2020); Elite 11 MVP (2018)

Career NFL statistics as of 2025
- Passing attempts: 485
- Passing completions: 304
- Completion percentage: 62.7%
- TD–INT: 12–10
- Passing yards: 2,903
- Passer rating: 78.9
- Stats at Pro Football Reference

Spencer Michael Rattler (born September 28, 2000) is an American professional football quarterback for the New Orleans Saints of the National Football League (NFL). He played his first three seasons of college football for the Oklahoma Sooners, receiving first-team All-Big 12 honors in 2020. In his final two seasons, Rattler was a member of the South Carolina Gamecocks. He was selected by the Saints in the fifth round of the 2024 NFL draft.

== Early life ==
Rattler attended Pinnacle High School in Phoenix, Arizona, for all of his four years of high school. He broke the Arizona high school passing record on his 18th birthday. Rattler threw for 11,083 yards in his four years with 116 passing touchdowns and rushed for 1,040 yards with 14 rushing touchdowns. Early in his senior season, Rattler was named MVP of the Elite 11 at The Opening in Texas.

In his final season at Pinnacle, Rattler starred in a Peter Berg-directed Netflix sports documentary series called QB1: Beyond the Lights. Rattler was later suspended for violating a district code of conduct, and was ineligible to play for the rest of the season due to cheating. He initially said he had a sprained MCL, but the school administration later advised him not to speak of the nature of the code of conduct violation.

By the end of his sophomore year in high school, Rattler had received 14 offers from NCAA D-I schools, including Alabama, Notre Dame, and Miami. On June 19, 2017, he visited Oklahoma on an unofficial visit and committed to Oklahoma a week later. On December 19, 2018, Rattler signed his letter of intent to play for coach Lincoln Riley and the Sooners. He was considered a 5 star quarterback by 247Sports and Rivals.com, and a 4 star by ESPN. Rattler was also considered the consensus #1 quarterback and #1 overall prospect from Arizona in the 2019 recruiting class.

== College career ==
=== Oklahoma ===
==== 2019 ====
On June 12, 2019, Rattler enrolled at Oklahoma. He saw action in the second half of the College Football Playoff Semi-Final Game against LSU. Overall, Rattler appeared in a total of three games in the 2019 season and was able to redshirt his freshman year of college.

==== 2020 ====
Going into his redshirt freshman season, Rattler competed with Tanner Mordecai for the starting job. On September 1, Lincoln Riley announced that Rattler had won the starting quarterback job over Mordecai, and Rattler made his starting debut on September 12 against Missouri State. On September 26, Rattler tied the Oklahoma record for most touchdown passes through two weeks with 8, set by Sam Bradford in 2008. However, Rattler's starting job got off to a rocky start when he and his Sooners were upset by Kansas State in his second start. In his third start, Rattler threw for 300 yards and 2 touchdowns in the upset loss at Iowa State. This loss snapped a streak of 24 straight home losses by Iowa State to Oklahoma. Rattler and the Sooners made a comeback with the win against Texas in the Red River Rivalry game. On November 7, Rattler injured his hip in a win against Kansas. As the starting quarterback, he led the Oklahoma Sooners to a 6th consecutive Big 12 Championship, winning 27–21 over Iowa State.

==== 2021 ====
Going into the 2021 season, many rated Rattler as a favorite to win the Heisman Trophy. However, during Oklahoma's match-up against Texas, Rattler was benched during the second quarter for Caleb Williams and would not play the rest of the season. In November 2021, Rattler's personal coach, Mike Giovando, announced that he would be leaving Oklahoma. Ole Miss, UCLA, Arizona State, Nebraska, Pitt, Auburn, Missouri, and Oregon were among the schools that pushed for Rattler the hardest.

=== South Carolina ===
In December 2021, Rattler announced he would be transferring to the University of South Carolina to play for the South Carolina Gamecocks, under head coach Shane Beamer. Rattler and Beamer had a connection from their time together at Oklahoma. South Carolina tight ends Austin Stogner and Jaheim Bell have also been cited as influencing Rattler's decision.

==== 2022 ====
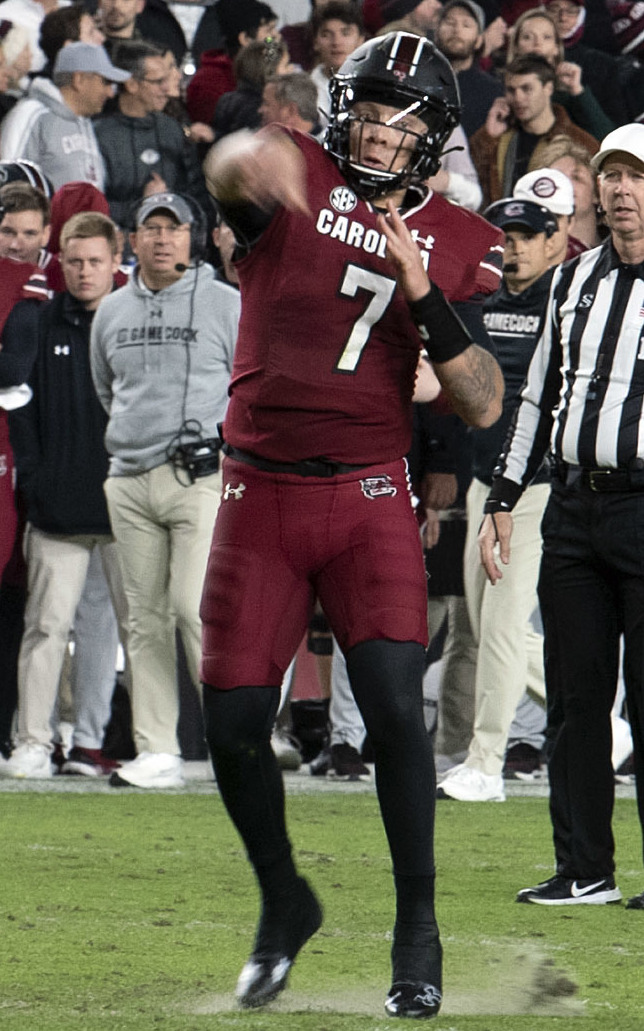
Rattler in the 2022 game against Tennessee

As the starting quarterback for South Carolina in 2022, Rattler led his team to an 8–5 record. He threw 3,012 passing yards and scored eighteen touchdowns but also threw twelve interceptions. His performance in the first ten games of the season was described as "underwhelming": he averaged 198 passing yards and threw more interceptions than touchdowns. However, at the end of the regular season, he led the Gamecocks in two massive upsets. He threw 438 passing yards and six touchdowns in a win over No. 5 Tennessee, breaking the program record for most touchdown passes in a game. The following week, he played for 360 yards and two touchdowns in a win over No. 8 Clemson, South Carolina's archrival, becoming the first South Carolina starting quarterback to beat Clemson since Connor Shaw in 2013. With these wins, Rattler became the first South Carolina quarterback to ever win back-to-back games against top 10 teams. South Carolina then reached its highest CFP ranking ever and its highest AP ranking since 2014, at No. 19 and No. 20, respectively.

In the 2022 Gator Bowl, Rattler and the Gamecocks lost to No. 21 Notre Dame 45–38 in a competitive game, finishing the season 8–5 and ranked No. 23, the program's first finish in the AP Poll since 2013, when they finished No. 4.

On January 10, 2023, Rattler announced he would return to South Carolina for 2023.

==== 2023 ====
Rattler led South Carolina to a 5–7 record in 2023, throwing a career-high 3,186 yards and 275 completions while doing so. His 2023 season was described as "one of the best quarterback seasons in school history" and Rattler was described as being "among the country’s best signal-callers".

Rattler declared for the 2024 NFL draft following the season, finishing fifth in career passing yards and first in career completion percentage at South Carolina. He played in the 2024 Senior Bowl and was named its MVP.

== Professional career ==
Pre-draft measurables
Height	Weight	Arm length	Hand span	Wingspan	40-yard dash	10-yard split	20-yard split	20-yard shuttle	Three-cone drill	Vertical jump	Broad jump
6 ft 0 1/4 in (1.84 m)	211 lb (96 kg)	31 in (0.79 m)	9 7/8 in (0.25 m)	6 ft 2 3/4 in (1.90 m)	4.95 s	1.63 s	2.83 s	4.37 s	7.21 s	32.0 in (0.81 m)	9 ft 0 in (2.74 m)
All values from NFL Combine

=== 2024 season ===
Rattler was selected by the New Orleans Saints in the fifth round with the 150th overall pick in the 2024 NFL draft. There were 137 players selected between Rattler and the previous quarterback drafted, Bo Nix, setting a record for the common draft era.

In the 2024 preseason, Rattler completed 20 of 38 pass attempts for 202 yards and a passing touchdown, as well as an 8 yard rushing touchdown.

After starting quarterback Derek Carr suffered an injury in Week 5, Spencer Rattler became the Saints' starting quarterback for Week 6 against the Tampa Bay Buccaneers, completing 22 of 40 passes for 243 yards, one touchdown, and two interceptions as the Saints lost 51–27. In his second start, a 33–10 loss to the Denver Broncos, Rattler completed 25 of 35 passes for 172 yards, rushed for 34 yards, and was sacked six times. He fumbled twice, one of which was returned for a touchdown, before leaving the game due to a hip injury late in the fourth quarter. In Week 15 against the Washington Commanders, Rattler replaced starting quarterback Jake Haener in the 2nd half. Rattler completed 10 of 21 passes for 135 yards and a touchdown to Foster Moreau with no time left on the clock, which brought the score within a point. However the Saints failed on the subsequent 2 point conversion attempt, thus losing 19–20. Rattler finished his rookie season playing in seven games. He finished with 1,317 passing yards, four touchdowns, and five interceptions. He also set a franchise record for most passing yards by a rookie quarterback.

=== 2025 season ===
Following a competition between Haener and rookie Tyler Shough, Rattler was named the Saints starting quarterback for the 2025 season by first-year head coach Kellen Moore. In Week 2 against the San Francisco 49ers, Rattler threw for 207 yards and three touchdowns in a 21–26 loss. Following an 0–4 start, Rattler threw for 225 yards and a touchdown in his first ever victory against the New York Giants in Week 5. However, the Saints would drop their next three games and fell to 1–7, leading to Rattler being benched in favor of Shough.

== Career statistics ==
=== NFL ===
Year	Team	Games			Passing										Rushing					Sacks		Fumbles	
Year	Team	GP	GS	Record	Cmp	Att	Pct	Yds	Y/A	Y/G	Lng	TD	Int	Rtg	Att	Yds	Avg	Lng	TD	Sck	SckY	Fum	Lost
2024	NO	7	6	0–6	130	228	57.0	1,317	5.8	188.1	41	4	5	70.4	18	146	8.1	28	0	22	136	5	3
2025	NO	9	8	1–7	174	257	67.7	1,586	6.2	198.3	87	8	5	86.5	31	167	5.4	15	0	18	104	4	1
Career		16	14	1–13	304	485	62.7	2,904	6.0	181.4	87	12	10	78.9	49	313	6.4	28	0	40	240	9	4

=== College ===
College statistics
Season	Team	Games			Passing							Rushing			
Season	Team	GP	GS	Record	Cmp	Att	Pct	Yds	TD	Int	Rtg	Att	Yds	Avg	TD
2019	Oklahoma	3	0	—	7	11	63.6	81	1	0	155.5	3	23	7.7	0
2020	Oklahoma	11	11	9–2	214	317	67.5	3,031	28	7	172.6	81	160	2.0	6
2021	Oklahoma	9	6	6–0	140	187	74.9	1,483	11	5	155.5	43	77	1.8	3
2022	South Carolina	13	13	8–5	264	399	66.2	3,026	18	12	138.7	73	46	0.6	3
2023	South Carolina	12	12	5–7	275	399	68.9	3,186	19	8	147.7	97	104	1.1	4
Career		48	42	28–14	900	1,313	68.5	10,807	77	32	152.2	297	410	1.4	16
