= Key Lawrence =

American football player (born 2001)

UCLA Bruins
- Position: Cornerback
- Class: Senior

Personal information
- Born: February 18, 2001 (age 25)
- Listed height: 6 ft 1 in (1.85 m)
- Listed weight: 206 lb (93 kg)

Career information
- High school: Ensworth High School
- College: Tennessee (2020); Oklahoma (2021–2023); Ole Miss (2024); UCLA (2025–present)
- Stats at ESPN

Keshawn Demar Lawrence (born February 18, 2001) is an American college football cornerback for the UCLA Bruins. He previously played for the Oklahoma Sooners, the Tennessee Volunteers and the Ole Miss Rebels.

== Early life ==
Lawrence attended Ensworth High School. He was rated as a four-star recruit and committed to play college football for the Tennessee Volunteers over offers from schools such as Alabama, Auburn, Clemson, Florida, Georgia, LSU, Miami, and Ohio State.

== College career ==
=== Tennessee ===
As a freshman in 2020, Lawrence had eight tackles and a pass deflection. After the season, he entered the NCAA transfer portal.

=== Oklahoma ===
Lawrence transferred to play for the Oklahoma Sooners. In week 8 of the 2021 season, he made his first career start versus Kansas State, where he made seven tackles with two being for a loss, and forced a fumble. In week 11, Lawrence notched seven tackles and two pass deflection in a win over Texas Tech. He finished the 2021 season with 47 tackles, four pass deflections, and three forced fumbles, where for his performance he was named an all-Big 12 Conference honorable mention. In 2022, Lawrence tallied 57 tackles five pass deflections, an interception and two forced fumbles. He opened the 2023 season strong, forcing a fumble in week 2 and intercepting a pass in week 3. In week 4, Lawrence notched three tackles and an interception in a 20-6 win over Cincinnati. During the 2023 season, he totaled 44 tackles, three pass deflections, two interceptions, and a forced fumble. After the season, Lawrence entered the NCAA transfer portal.

=== Ole Miss ===
Lawrence decided to transfer to play for the Ole Miss Rebels.

On October 14, 2024, Lawrence announced that he would redshirt and was removed from Ole Miss's roster.

=== UCLA ===
On December 17, 2024, Lawrence announced that he would transfer to UCLA.

== Professional career ==
Pre-draft measurables
Height	Weight	Arm length	Hand span	Wingspan	40-yard dash	10-yard split	20-yard split	20-yard shuttle	Three-cone drill	Vertical jump	Broad jump	Bench press
6 ft 1 1/4 in (1.86 m)	206 lb (93 kg)	31 1/4 in (0.79 m)	8 7/8 in (0.23 m)	6 ft 4 1/2 in (1.94 m)	4.56 s	1.62 s	2.64 s	4.44 s	7.37 s	34.5 in (0.88 m)	10 ft 5 in (3.18 m)	16 reps
All values from Pro Day
