= Kennedy Brooks =

American football player (born 1998)

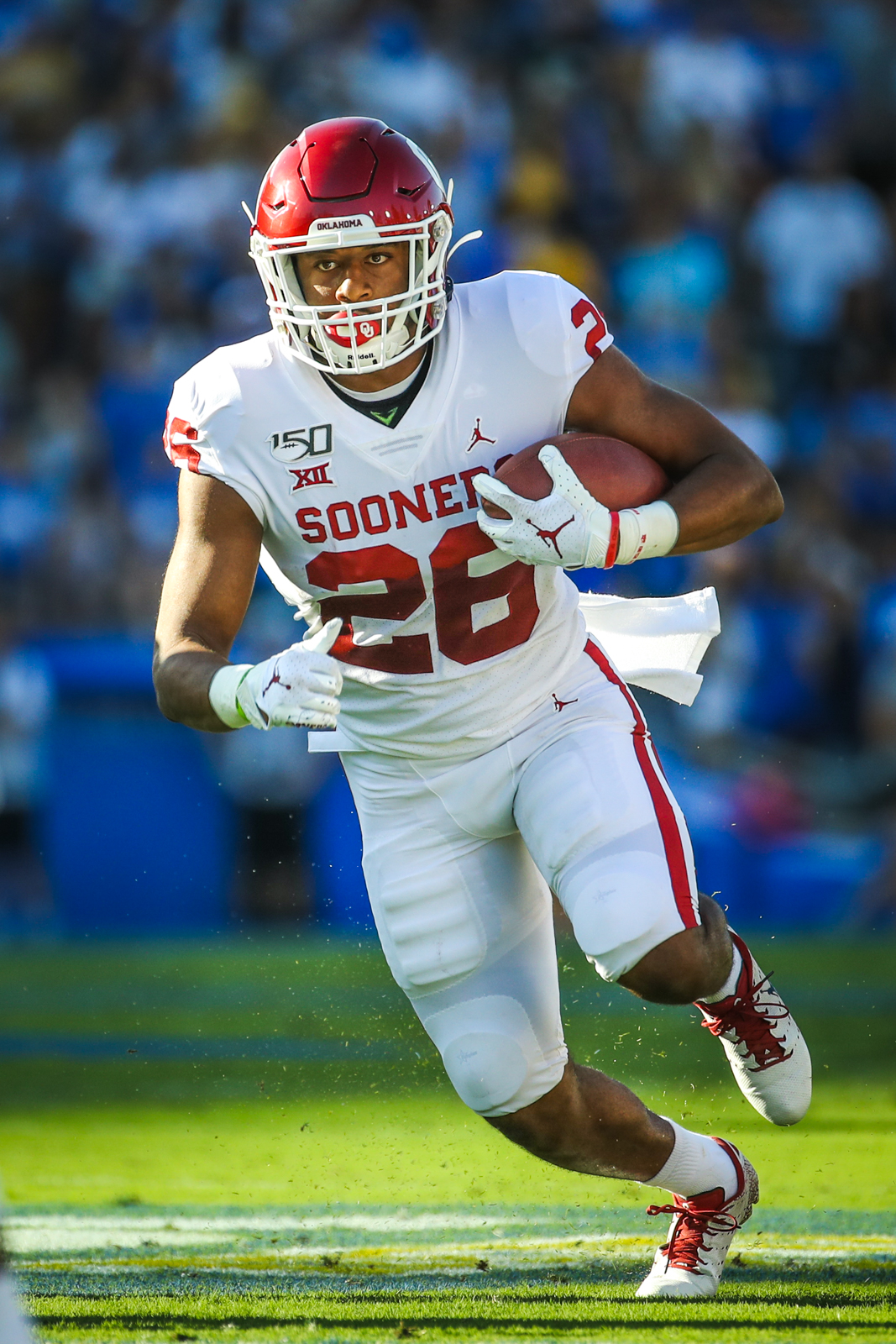
- Brooks with the Oklahoma Sooners in 2019

Profile
- Position: Running back

Personal information
- Born: October 8, 1998 (age 28); Mansfield, Texas, U.S.
- Listed height: 5 ft 11 in (1.80 m)
- Listed weight: 213 lb (97 kg)

Career information
- High school: Mansfield
- College: Oklahoma (2017–2021)
- NFL draft: 2022: undrafted

Career history
- Philadelphia Eagles (2022)*; Philadelphia Stars (2024)*; Memphis Showboats (2024)*; Saskatchewan Roughriders (2024)*
- * Offseason or practice squad member only

Awards and highlights
- Second-team All-Big 12 (2019)
- Stats at Pro Football Reference

Kennedy Brooks (born October 8, 1998) is an American professional football running back. He played college football at Oklahoma.

== Early life ==
Brooks attended Mansfield High School in Mansfield, Texas. During his high school career he had 7,658 yards and 96 touchdowns. As a senior in 2016, he was the recipient of the Landry Award as the top player in the Dallas-Fort Worth metroplex. He committed to the University of Oklahoma to play college football.

== College career ==
Kennedy missed his first season at Oklahoma in 2017 with a shoulder injury and redshirted. He returned from the injury in 2018, to rush for 1,056 yards on 119 carries with 12 touchdowns.

=== College statistics ===
Oklahoma
Year	Games		Rushing					Receiving				
Year	GP	GS	Att	Yds	Avg	Lng	TD	Rec	Yds	Avg	Lng	TD
2018	12	0	119	1,056	8.9	86	12	10	57	5.7	11	0
2019	13	10	155	1,011	6.5	48	6	10	79	7.9	24	0
2020	DNP											
2021	13	7	198	1,253	6.3	65	13	9	73	8.1	25	0
Career	38	17	472	3,320	7.0	86	31	29	209	7.2	25	0

== Professional career ==
Pre-draft measurables
Height	Weight	Arm length	Hand span	Wingspan	40-yard dash	10-yard split	20-yard split	20-yard shuttle	Three-cone drill	Vertical jump	Broad jump	Bench press
5 ft 10 5/8 in (1.79 m)	209 lb (95 kg)	30 1/4 in (0.77 m)	7 5/8 in (0.19 m)	6 ft 2 3/4 in (1.90 m)	4.59 s	1.52 s	2.60 s	4.40 s	7.03 s	35.5 in (0.90 m)	10 ft 0 in (3.05 m)	14 reps
All values from NFL Combine/Pro Day

=== Philadelphia Eagles ===
On April 30, 2022, Brooks was signed as an undrafted free agent by the Philadelphia Eagles following the 2022 NFL draft. He was waived on August 30, 2022, and signed to the practice squad the next day. He was released on November 29. He signed a reserve/future contract on January 19, 2023. He was released on August 29, 2023.

=== Philadelphia Stars ===
On October 31, 2023, Brooks signed with the Philadelphia Stars of the United States Football League (USFL). The Stars folded when the XFL and USFL merged to create the United Football League (UFL).

=== Memphis Showboats ===
On January 5, 2024, Brooks was selected by the Memphis Showboats during the 2024 UFL dispersal draft. He was waived on March 2, 2024.

=== Saskatchewan Roughriders ===
On April 12, 2024, Brooks signed with the Saskatchewan Roughriders of the Canadian Football League (CFL).
