= Austin Stogner =

American football player (born 2000)

Profile
- Position: Tight end

Personal information
- Born: January 12, 2000 (age 26); Vinita, Oklahoma, U.S.
- Listed height: 6 ft 6 in (1.98 m)
- Listed weight: 258 lb (117 kg)

Career information
- High school: Prestonwood Christian Academy (Plano, Texas)
- College: Oklahoma (2019–2021, 2023); South Carolina (2022)
- NFL draft: 2024: undrafted

Career history
- Atlanta Falcons (2024)*
- * Offseason or practice squad member only

Awards and highlights
- Second-team All-Big 12 (2020)

Austin Stogner (born January 12, 2000) is an American professional football tight end. He played college football at Oklahoma and South Carolina.

== Early life ==
Stogner grew up in Plano, Texas and attended Prestonwood Christian Academy. As a senior, he had 50 receptions for 691 yards and six touchdowns and played in the 2018 All-American Bowl. Stogner was rated a four star recruit and committed to play college football at Oklahoma over offers from Nebraska, LSU and Ohio State.

== College career ==
Stogner played in all 14 of Oklahoma's games as a true freshman and caught seven passes for 66 yards and two touchdowns. He became the team's starting H-Back going into his sophomore season. Stogner finished the season with 26 receptions for 422 yards and three touchdowns while missing the final three regular season games due to a knee injury that required surgery and was named second team All-Big 12 Conference by the Associated Press. Following surgery, he contracted a staph infection and lost 35 pounds. As a junior, Stogner played in nine games and caught 14 passes for 166 yards and three touchdowns. Following the end of the regular season and the departure of Oklahoma head coach Lincoln Riley, Stogner entered the NCAA transfer portal.

On December 13, 2021, Stogner announced that he would be transferring to the University of South Carolina alongside former Oklahoma quarterback Spencer Rattler.

On December 8, 2022, Stogner announced on social media that he would be transferring back to the University of Oklahoma as a graduate transfer to play out his final year of eligibility with the Sooners.

== Professional career ==
Pre-draft measurables
| Height | Weight | Arm length | Hand span | 40-yard dash | 10-yard split | 20-yard split | 20-yard shuttle | Three-cone drill | Vertical jump | Broad jump | Bench press |
|---|---|---|---|---|---|---|---|---|---|---|---|
| 6 ft 6 in (1.98 m) | 254 lb (115 kg) | 34 in (0.86 m) | 9 3/4 in (0.25 m) | 4.85 s | 1.68 s | 2.81 s | 4.37 s | 7.25 s | 35.0 in (0.89 m) | 9 ft 8 in (2.95 m) | 16 reps |
All values from Pro Day

Stogner signed with the Atlanta Falcons as an undrafted free agent on April 28, 2024. He was waived on August 25.
