= Jeremiah Hall =

American football player (born 1998)

Profile
- Position: Fullback

Personal information
- Born: November 6, 1998 (age 28); Charlotte, North Carolina
- Listed height: 6 ft 2 in (1.88 m)
- Listed weight: 248 lb (112 kg)

Career information
- High school: Zebulon B. Vance (Charlotte)
- College: Oklahoma
- NFL draft: 2022: undrafted

Career history
- New York Giants (2022)*
- * Offseason or practice squad member only

Awards and highlights
- 2× First-team All-Big 12 (2020, 2021); Second-team All-Big 12 (2019)
- Stats at Pro Football Reference

Jeremiah Hall (born November 6, 1998) is an American former professional football player who was a fullback in the National Football League (NFL). He played college football for the Oklahoma Sooners.

== Early life ==
Hall grew up in Charlotte, North Carolina, and attended Zebulon B. Vance High School. He was named first-team All-State as a senior after gaining 1,005 yards of total offense and scoring 22 touchdowns. Hall was rated a three-star recruit and committed to play college football for the Oklahoma Sooners over offers from Maryland, Pittsburgh, and Syracuse.

== College career ==
Hall redshirted his true freshman season at Oklahoma. He played in all 14 of Oklahoma's games during his redshirt freshman season and rushed four times for 21 yards and had two receptions for 36 yards. As a redshirt sophomore, Hall caught 16 passes for 169 yards and 3 touchdowns and was named second-team All-Big 12 Conference. He was named first-team All-Big 12 after catching 18 passes for 218 yards and five touchdowns. He repeated as a first-team All-Big 12 selection after finishing his senior season with 32 receptions for 334 yards and four touchdowns.

== Professional career ==
Pre-draft measurables
Height	Weight	Arm length	Hand span	Wingspan	40-yard dash	10-yard split	20-yard split	20-yard shuttle	Three-cone drill	Vertical jump	Broad jump	Bench press
6 ft 1 1/2 in (1.87 m)	239 lb (108 kg)	31 5/8 in (0.80 m)	10 1/2 in (0.27 m)	6 ft 4 5/8 in (1.95 m)	4.84 s	1.76 s	2.76 s	4.51 s	7.20 s	33.0 in (0.84 m)	9 ft 3 in (2.82 m)	19 reps
All values from NFL Combine/Pro Day

Hall signed with the New York Giants as an undrafted free agent on May 16, 2022. He was waived on August 16, 2022.
