= Eric Gray (American football) =

American football player (born 1999)

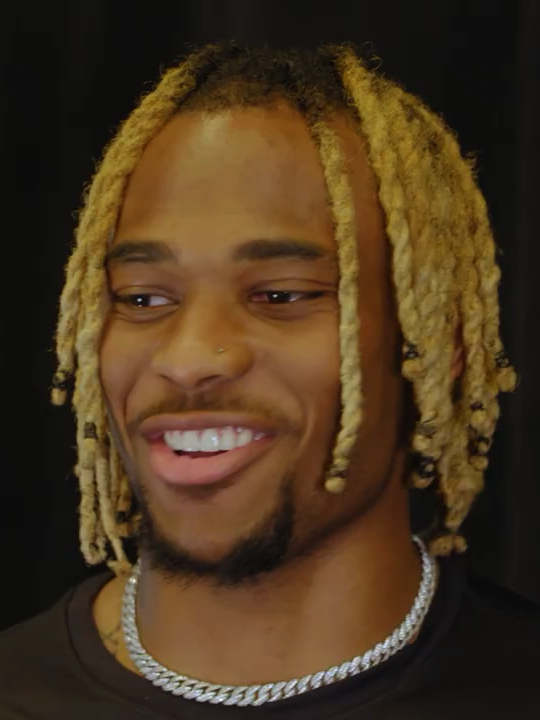
- Gray in 2023

Profile
- Position: Running back / Kickoff returner

Personal information
- Born: November 4, 1999 (age 27); Memphis, Tennessee, U.S.
- Listed height: 5 ft 10 in (1.78 m)
- Listed weight: 211 lb (96 kg)

Career information
- High school: Lausanne Collegiate School (Memphis)
- College: Tennessee (2019–2020); Oklahoma (2021–2022)
- NFL draft: 2023: 5th round, 172nd overall pick

Career history
- New York Giants (2023–2025); Cleveland Browns (2026)*; New York Giants (2026)*
- * Offseason or practice squad member only

Awards and highlights
- Second-team All-Big 12 (2022)

Career NFL statistics as of 2025
- Rushing attempts: 31
- Rushing yards: 79
- Receptions: 16
- Receiving yards: 104
- Return yards: 681
- Stats at Pro Football Reference

Eric DeWayne Gray (born November 4, 1999) is a professional football running back and kickoff returner. He played college football for the Tennessee Volunteers and Oklahoma, and was selected by the New York Giants in the 2023 NFL draft.

== Early life ==
Gray grew up in Memphis, Tennessee and attended Lausanne Collegiate School. He was named Tennessee Mr. Football after rushing for 2,251 yards and 38 touchdowns in his sophomore season. As a junior, Gray rushed for 3,151 yards and 45 touchdowns and was selected the Tennessee Gatorade Football Player of the Year and repeated as Tennessee Mr. Football. In his sophomore and junior year, he won the Tennessee High School Championship. Rated a four-star recruit, he initially committed to play college football at Michigan during the summer going into his senior year. He was named the Gatorade Football Player of the Year a second time and Mr. Football for a third straight season as a senior. Towards the end of his senior season, Gray decommitted from Michigan and reopened his recruitment. He ultimately committed to play at Tennessee a few weeks later.

== College career ==
As a true freshman, Gray gained 539 yards and scored four touchdowns on 101 carries and caught 13 passes for 115 yards and a touchdown. He rushed for 246 yards, a school record for a freshman, and three touchdowns in the Volunteers final regular season game against Vanderbilt and was named the Southeastern Conference Freshman of the Week. Gray lead Tennessee with 772 rushing yards and four touchdowns on 157 attempts and also gained 254 yards and scored two touchdowns on 30 receptions. In January 2021, Gray announced that he was entering the transfer portal.

Gray chose to transfer to the University of Oklahoma. In the 2021 season, Gray had 78 carries for 412 rushing yards and two rushing touchdowns to go along with 23 receptions for 229 receiving yards and two receiving touchdowns. In the 2022 season, Gray took over the Sooners' backfield. On November 12 against West Virginia, he had 25 carries for 211 yards and two touchdowns in the road loss. In the 2022 season, Gray had 213 carries for 1,366 rushing yards and 11 rushing touchdowns to go with 33 receptions for 229 receiving yards. He had eight games on the season going over 100 rushing yards and four with two rushing touchdowns.

== Professional career ==
Pre-draft measurables
Height	Weight	Arm length	Hand span	Wingspan	40-yard dash	10-yard split	20-yard split	20-yard shuttle	Three-cone drill	Vertical jump	Broad jump	Bench press
5 ft 9 1/2 in (1.77 m)	207 lb (94 kg)	29 5/8 in (0.75 m)	9 3/4 in (0.25 m)	5 ft 11 3/8 in (1.81 m)	4.62 s	1.55 s	2.64 s	4.10 s	7.17 s	37.5 in (0.95 m)	9 ft 10 in (3.00 m)	12 reps
All values from NFL Combine/Pro Day

=== New York Giants (first stint) ===
Gray was selected by the New York Giants in the fifth round, 172nd overall, of the 2023 NFL draft. He was placed on injured reserve on October 25, 2023. He was activated on November 25. As a rookie, Gray appeared in 13 games. He had a small role on the offense to go with occasional kickoff and punt return duties.

On July 22, 2025, Gray was placed on the PUP list due to a torn meniscus. He was activated on November 22, ahead of the team's Week 12 matchup against the Detroit Lions.

On August 30, 2026, Gray was waived by the Giants as a part of final roster cuts.

=== Cleveland Browns ===
On September 15, 2026, Gray was signed to the Cleveland Browns' practice squad. On October 6, he was released.

=== New York Giants (second stint) ===
On November 2, 2026, Gray was signed to the New York Giants practice squad, following injuries to Cam Skattebo and Tyrone Tracy Jr. On November 17, he was released.

== NFL career statistics ==
Year	Team	Games		Rushing					Receiving					Kick returns					Punt returns					Fumbles	
Year	Team	GP	GS	Att	Yds	Avg	Lng	TD	Rec	Yds	Avg	Lng	TD	Ret	Yds	Avg	Lng	TD	Ret	Yds	Avg	Lng	TD	Fum	Lost
2023	NYG	13	0	17	48	2.8	12	0	6	22	3.7	9	0	4	58	14.5	20	0	7	28	4.0	14	0	3	0
2024	NYG	17	0	14	31	2.2	6	0	10	82	8.2	19	0	21	554	26.4	37	0	—	—	—	—	—	3	2
2025	NYG	4	0	—	—	—	—	—	—	—	—	—	—	2	41	20.5	26	0	—	—	—	—	—	0	0
Career		34	0	31	79	2.5	12	0	16	104	6.5	19	0	27	653	24.2	37	0	7	28	4.0	14	0	6	2
