= Jadon Haselwood =

American football player (born 2001)

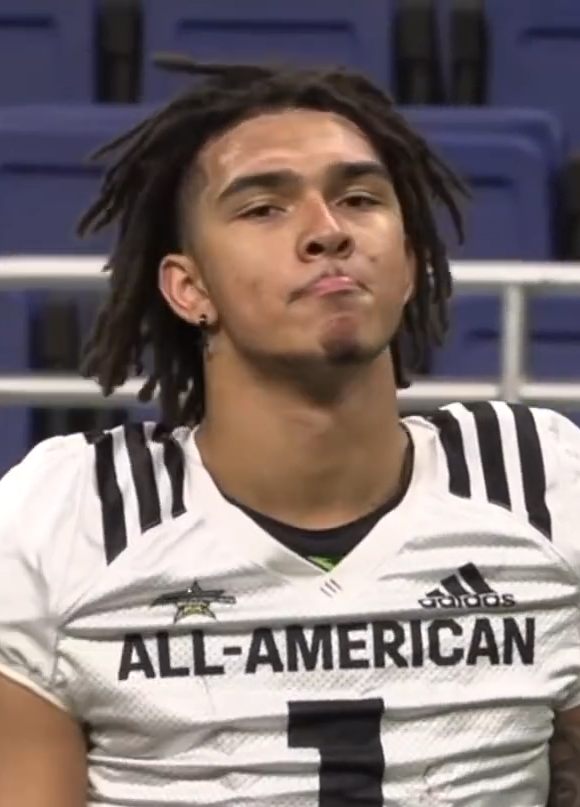
- Haselwood in 2019

Profile
- Position: Wide receiver

Personal information
- Born: April 15, 2001 (age 25); Ellenwood, Georgia, U.S.
- Listed height: 6 ft 2 in (1.88 m)
- Listed weight: 215 lb (98 kg)

Career information
- High school: Cedar Grove (Ellenwood, Georgia)
- College: Oklahoma (2019–2021); Arkansas (2022)
- NFL draft: 2023: undrafted

Career history
- Philadelphia Eagles (2023)*
- * Offseason or practice squad member only
- Stats at Pro Football Reference

Jadon S. Haselwood (born April 15, 2001) is an American professional football wide receiver. He played college football for the Oklahoma Sooners and Arkansas Razorbacks.

== Early life ==
Haselwood attended Cedar Grove High School in Ellenwood, Georgia. As a senior he had 53 receptions for 1,032 yards and 11 touchdowns. He played in the 2019 All-American Bowl. A five-star recruit and the number one ranked receiver in his class, Haselwood originally committed to the University of Georgia to play college football before switching to the University of Oklahoma.

== College career ==
Haselwood played at Oklahoma from 2019 to 2021. As a true freshman in 2019, he played in 13 games, had 19 receptions for 272 yards, and scored a touchdown. He missed the first six games of his sophomore year in 2020. He finished the season with four receptions for 65 yards over three games. As a junior in 2021, Haselwood played in 12 games and led the team with 39 receptions for 399 yards and six touchdowns.

After the 2021 season, Haselwood transferred to the University of Arkansas.

== Professional career ==
Pre-draft measurables
Height	Weight	Arm length	Hand span	40-yard dash	10-yard split	20-yard split	20-yard shuttle	Three-cone drill	Vertical jump	Broad jump
6 ft 2 1/4 in (1.89 m)	215 lb (98 kg)	31 1/4 in (0.79 m)	10 in (0.25 m)	4.60 s	1.58 s	2.64 s	4.31 s	6.98 s	37.0 in (0.94 m)	10 ft 3 in (3.12 m)

Haselwood was signed by the Philadelphia Eagles as an undrafted free agent on May 5, 2023. He was released on August 29, 2023.
