= 2022 Oklahoma Sooners football team =

American college football season

2022 Oklahoma Sooners football

Cheez-It Bowl, L 32–35 vs. Florida State
- Conference: Big 12 Conference
- Record: 6–7 (3–6 Big 12)
- Head coach: Brent Venables (1st season)
- Offensive coordinator: Jeff Lebby (1st season)
- Offensive scheme: Veer and shoot
- Defensive coordinator: Ted Roof (1st season)
- Co-defensive coordinators: Todd Bates (1st season); Jay Valai (1st season)
- Base defense: 4–3
- Home stadium: Gaylord Family Oklahoma Memorial Stadium

2022 Big 12 Conference football standings
	Conf.			Overall
Team	W		L	W		L
No. 2 TCU y^	9	–	0	13	–	2
No. 14 Kansas State y$	7	–	2	10	–	4
No. 25 Texas	6	–	3	8	–	5
Texas Tech	5	–	4	8	–	5
Oklahoma State	4	–	5	7	–	6
Baylor	4	–	5	6	–	7
Oklahoma	3	–	6	6	–	7
Kansas	3	–	6	6	–	7
West Virginia	3	–	6	5	–	7
Iowa State	1	–	8	4	–	8
Championship: Kansas State 31, TCU 28 ^{OT}
^ – College Football Playoff participant; $ – Conference champion; y – Championship game participant; Rankings from AP Poll

The 2022 Oklahoma Sooners football team represented the University of Oklahoma during the 2022 NCAA Division I FBS football season, the 128th season for the Oklahoma Sooners. They played their home games at Gaylord Family Oklahoma Memorial Stadium in Norman, Oklahoma. They are a charter member of the Big 12 Conference. 2022 marked the first time the Sooners finished with a losing record since 1998. Despite this, the Sooners continued the streak of participating in a bowl game every season since 1999. They were led by first-year head coach Brent Venables.

== Offseason ==
=== Offseason departures ===
2022 Oklahoma offseason departures
Name	Number	Pos.	Height	Weight	Year	Hometown	Notes
Tanner Schafer	#1	QB	6'3	217	(redshirt) Senior	Canadian, TX	Graduated
Michael Woods II	#8	WR	6'1	198	Senior	Magnolia, TX	Graduated/Declared for 2022 NFL Draft
Perrion Winfrey	#8	DL	6'3	297	Senior	Maywood, IL	Graduated/Declared for 2022 NFL Draft
Nik Bonitto	#11	LB	6'3	238	(redshirt) Junior	Fort Lauderdale, FL	Declared for 2022 NFL Draft
Caleb Kelly	#19	LB	6'3	232	(redshirt) Senior	Fresno, CA	Graduated
DaShaun White	#23	LB	6'0	227	Senior	North Richland Hills, TX	Graduated
Brian Asamoah	#24	LB	6'1	230	(redshirt) Junior	Columbus, OH	Declared for 2022 NFL Draft
Justin Broiles	#25	DB	5'10	190	(redshirt) Senior	Oklahoma City, OK	Graduated
Kennedy Brooks	#26	RB	6'2	234	(redshirt) Junior	Mansfield, TX	Declared for 2022 NFL Draft
Jeremiah Hall	#27	TE	6'2	253	(redshirt) Senior	Charlotte, NC	Graduated/Declared for 2022 NFL Draft
Delarrin Turner-Yell	#32	DB	5'10	195	Senior	Hempstead, TX	Graduated/Declared for 2022 NFL Draft
Bryan Mead	#38	LB	6'2	226	(redshirt) Senior	Owasso, OK	Graduated
Reeves Mundschau	#46	P	5'11	183	(redshirt) Senior	New Braunfels, TX	Graduated
Tyrese Robinson	#52	OL	6'3	335	(redshirt) Senior	McKinney, TX	Graduated/Declared for NFL Draft
Marquis Hayes	#54	OL	6'5	349	(redshirt) Senior	St. Louis, MO	Graduated/Declared for 2022 NFL Draft
Ian McIver	#61	OL	6'3	315	(redshirt) Senior	Keller, TX	Graduated
Finley Felix	#65	OL	6'5	298	(redshirt) Senior	Fort Myers, FL	Graduated
Robert Congel	#66	OL	6'4	326	(redshirt) Senior	Greenwood Village, CO	Graduated
Erik Swenson	#77	OL	6'5	326	(redshirt) Senior	Downers Grove, IL	Graduated
Colt Atkinson	#86	WR	6'0	171	(redshirt) Senior	Denton, TX	Graduated
Spencer Jones	#87	QB	6'1	202	(redshirt) Senior	Nashville, TN	Graduated
Dominique Jones	#91	DL	6'1	292	(redshirt) Senior	Oklahoma City, OK	Graduated
Isaiah Thomas	#95	DL	6'5	267	(redshirt) Senior	Tulsa, OK	Graduated/Declared for 2022 NFL Draft
Abdelrahman Assaf	#96	DL	6'0	252	(redshirt) Senior	Cairo, Egypt	Graduated

=== Outgoing transfers ===
The Sooners lost 13 players via transfer portal for the 2022 season.

Name	No.	Pos.	Height	Weight	Year	Hometown	New school
Jamal Morris	#3	LB	6 ft 2 in (1.88 m)	210 pounds (95 kg)	(redshirt) Sophomore	Houston, TX	Houston
Mario Williams	#4	WR	5 ft 9 in (1.75 m)	186 pounds (84 kg)	Freshman	Tampa, FL	USC
Cody Jackson	#6	WR	5 ft 11 in (1.80 m)	180 pounds (82 kg)	(redshirt) Freshmen	Richmond, TX	Houston
Spencer Rattler	#7	QB	6 ft 1 in (1.85 m)	205 pounds (93 kg)	(redshirt) Sophomore	Phoenix, AZ	South Carolina
Latrell McCuthin	#7	CB	6 ft 1 in (1.85 m)	185 pounds (84 kg)	Freshman	Austin, TX	USC
Patrick Fields	#10	DB	5 ft 11 in (1.80 m)	204 pounds (93 kg)	Senior	Tulsa, OK	Stanford
Jadon Haselwood	#11	WR	6 ft 2 in (1.88 m)	200 pounds (91 kg)	Junior	Ellenwood, GA	Arkansas
Caleb Williams	#13	QB	6 ft 1 in (1.85 m)	218 pounds (99 kg)	Freshman	Washington, D.C.	USC
Ben Harris	#15	QB	6 ft 3 in (1.91 m)	204 pounds (93 kg)	(redshirt) Freshmen	Midwest City, OK	North Alabama
Austin Stogner	#18	TE	6 ft 6 in (1.98 m)	262 pounds (119 kg)	Sophomore	Plano, TX	South Carolina
Dorian Plumley	#34	CB	6 ft 0 in (1.83 m)	190 pounds (86 kg)	(redshirt) Sophomore	EL Reno, OK	Abilene Christian
Noah Arinze	#42	DL	6 ft 5 in (1.96 m)	252 pounds (114 kg)	(redshirt) Sophomore	Kirkwood, MO	New Mexico
Darrell Simpson	#79	OT	6 ft 8 in (2.03 m)	348 pounds (158 kg)	(redshirt) Senior	Justin, TX	Tulsa

=== Additions ===
Incoming transfers

Name	No.	Pos.	Height	Weight	Year	Hometown	Prev. school
Dillon Gabriel	#8	QB	6 ft 0 in (1.83 m)	186 pounds (84 kg)	Junior	Miliani, HI	UCF
Davis Beville	#11	QB	6 ft 6 in (1.98 m)	200 pounds (91 kg)	RS Sophomore	Greenville, SC	Pittsburgh
T.D. Roof	#15	LB	5 ft 11 in (1.80 m)	215 pounds (98 kg)	Junior	Buford, GA	Appalachian State
McKade Mettauer	#72	OL	6 ft 4 in (1.93 m)	305 pounds (138 kg)	Junior	The Woodlands, TX	California
Daniel Parker, Jr.	#82	TE	6 ft 4 in (1.93 m)	245 pounds (111 kg)	Junior	Kansas City, MO	Missouri
Jonah Laulu	#99	DL	6 ft 6 in (1.98 m)	280 pounds (130 kg)	Junior	Las Vegas, NV	Hawaii
Kani Walker	#--	CB	6 ft 1 in (1.85 m)	175 pounds (79 kg)	Freshman	Suwanee, GA	Louisville
C.J. Coldon	#--	CB	6 ft 1 in (1.85 m)	180 pounds (82 kg)	Junior	Belleville, IL	Wyoming
Tyler Guyton	#--	OT	6 ft 7 in (2.01 m)	312 pounds (142 kg)	RS Freshman	Manor, TX	TCU
Jeffery Johnson	#77	DT	6 ft 3 in (1.91 m)	295 pounds (134 kg)	Senior	Brookhaven, MS	Tulane
Trey Morrison	#--	CB	5 ft 9 in (1.75 m)	190 pounds (86 kg)	Senior	Norcross, GA	North Carolina
LV Bunkley-Shelton	#--	WR	5 ft 11 in (1.80 m)	195 pounds (88 kg)	RS Freshmen	Compton, CA	Arizona State

==== Recruiting class ====
College recruiting
Name	Hometown	School	Height	Weight	Commit date
Gavin Sawchuk; RB	Highlands Ranch, CO	Valor Christian High School	5 ft 11 in (1.80 m)	175 lb (79 kg)	Jun 22, 2021
Gavin Sawchuk; RB	Recruit ratings: Rivals: 247Sports: ESPN: (86)				
Gentry Williams; ATH	Tulsa, OK	Booker T. Washington High School	5 ft 11 in (1.80 m)	170 lb (77 kg)	Oct 18, 2021
Gentry Williams; ATH	Recruit ratings: Rivals: 247Sports: ESPN: (86)				
Kobie McKinzie; LB	Lubbock, TX	Lubbock-Cooper High School	6 ft 3 in (1.91 m)	225 lb (102 kg)	Dec 13, 2021
Kobie McKinzie; LB	Recruit ratings: Rivals: 247Sports: ESPN: (84)				
Jovantae Barnes; RB	Las Vegas, NV	Desert Pines High School	5 ft 11 in (1.80 m)	185 lb (84 kg)	Jan 1, 2022
Jovantae Barnes; RB	Recruit ratings: Rivals: 247Sports: ESPN: (84)				
Nicholas Anderson; WR	Katy, TX	Katy High School	6 ft 4 in (1.93 m)	195 lb (88 kg)	Nov 1, 2021
Nicholas Anderson; WR	Recruit ratings: Rivals: 247Sports: ESPN: (84)				
Robert Spears-Jennings; ATH	Broken Arrow, OK	Broken Arrow High School	6 ft 2 in (1.88 m)	195 lb (88 kg)	Jul 4, 2021
Robert Spears-Jennings; ATH	Recruit ratings: Rivals: 247Sports: ESPN: (84)				
Nick Evers; QB	Flower Mound, TX	Flower Mound High School	6 ft 3 in (1.91 m)	190 lb (86 kg)	Dec 13, 2021
Nick Evers; QB	Recruit ratings: Rivals: 247Sports: ESPN: (83)				
Jaren Kanak; ATH	Hays, KS	Hays High School	6 ft 2 in (1.88 m)	210 lb (95 kg)	Dec 21, 2021
Jaren Kanak; ATH	Recruit ratings: Rivals: 247Sports: ESPN: (83)				
Jayden Gibson; WR	Winter Garden, FL	West Orange High School	6 ft 5 in (1.96 m)	190 lb (86 kg)	Dec 14, 2021
Jayden Gibson; WR	Recruit ratings: Rivals: 247Sports: ESPN: (82)				
Jacob Sexton; OT	Lamont, OK	Deer Creek-Lamont High School	6 ft 5 in (1.96 m)	290 lb (130 kg)	Jul 3, 2021
Jacob Sexton; OT	Recruit ratings: Rivals: 247Sports: ESPN: (81)				
Gracen Halton; DE	San Diego, CA	Saint Augustine High School	6 ft 3 in (1.91 m)	250 lb (110 kg)	Feb 2, 2022
Gracen Halton; DE	Recruit ratings: Rivals: 247Sports: ESPN: (81)				
Jake Taylor; OT	Las Vegas, NV	Bishop Gorman High School	6 ft 5 in (1.96 m)	270 lb (120 kg)	Jul 7, 2021
Jake Taylor; OT	Recruit ratings: Rivals: 247Sports: ESPN: (81)				
Jamarrien Burt; WR	Ocala, FL	Lake Weir High School	6 ft 0 in (1.83 m)	165 lb (75 kg)	Feb 2, 2022
Jamarrien Burt; WR	Recruit ratings: Rivals: 247Sports: ESPN: (80)				
Jason Llewellyn; TE	Aledo, TX	Aledo High School	6 ft 5 in (1.96 m)	240 lb (110 kg)	Feb 19, 2021
Jason Llewellyn; TE	Recruit ratings: Rivals: 247Sports: ESPN: (80)				
Kaden Helms; TE	Bellevue, NE	Bellevue West High School	6 ft 5 in (1.96 m)	220 lb (100 kg)	Jul 17, 2021
Kaden Helms; TE	Recruit ratings: Rivals: 247Sports: ESPN: (80)				
Kip Lewis; LB	Carthage, TX	Carthage High School	6 ft 2 in (1.88 m)	200 lb (91 kg)	Apr 30, 2021
Kip Lewis; LB	Recruit ratings: Rivals: 247Sports: ESPN: (80)				
Kevonte Henry; LB	Lawndale, CA	Leuzinger High School	6 ft 2 in (1.88 m)	225 lb (102 kg)	Jun 25, 2021
Kevonte Henry; LB	Recruit ratings: Rivals: 247Sports: ESPN: (78)				
Cedric Roberts; DT	Pflugerville, TX	Hendrickson High School	6 ft 3 in (1.91 m)	270 lb (120 kg)	Jul 28, 2021
Cedric Roberts; DT	Recruit ratings: Rivals: 247Sports: ESPN: (78)				
Jayden Rowe; S	Tulsa, OK	Union City High School	6 ft 3 in (1.91 m)	205 lb (93 kg)	Apr 30, 2021
Jayden Rowe; S	Recruit ratings: Rivals: 247Sports: ESPN: (78)				
R Mason Thomas; DE	Fort Lauderdale, FL	Cardinal Gibbons High School	6 ft 3 in (1.91 m)	215 lb (98 kg)	Feb 2, 2022
R Mason Thomas; DE	Recruit ratings: Rivals: 247Sports: ESPN: (77)				
Alton Tarber; DT	Deerfield Beach, FL	Deerfield Beach High School	6 ft 2 in (1.88 m)	310 lb (140 kg)	Dec 14, 2021
Alton Tarber; DT	Recruit ratings: Rivals: 247Sports: ESPN: (75)				
General Booty; QB	Allen, TX	Tyler Junior College	6 ft 2 in (1.88 m)	195 lb (88 kg)	May 14, 2021
General Booty; QB	Recruit ratings: No ratings found				
Overall recruit ranking: Rivals: #10 247Sports: #10 ESPN: #10
Note: In many cases, Scout, Rivals, 247Sports, On3, and ESPN may conflict in their listings of height and weight.; In these cases, the average was taken. ESPN grades are on a 100-point scale.; Sources: "Rivals commits". Rivals.; "ESPN commits". ESPN.; "2022 Team Ranking". Rivals.com.; "247Sports commits". 247Sports.

*= 247Sports Composite rating; ratings are out of 1.00. (five stars= 1.00–.98, four stars= .97–.90, three stars= .80–.89, two stars= .79–.70, no stars= <70)
†= Despite being rated as a four and five star recruit by ESPN, On3.com, Rivals.com and 247Sports.com, TBD received a four star 247Sports Composite rating.
Δ= Left the Oklahoma program following signing but prior to the 2022 season.

===== Overall class rankings =====
Website	National rank	Conference rank	5 star recruits	4 star recruits	3 star recruits	2 star recruits	1 star recruits	No star ranking
ESPN	#10	#2	0	13	4	0	0	0
On3 Recruits	#8	#2	0	15	2	0	0	0
Rivals	#10	#2	0	13	4	0	0	0
247 Sports	#10	#2	0	14	3	0	0	0

=== Returning starters ===
Offense

Player	Class	Position
Marvin Mims	Junior	Wide receiver

Defense

Player	Class	Position
Caleb Murphy	Senior	Defensive back

Special teams

Player	Class	Position
Marvin Mims	Junior	Kickoff/Punt Returner

† Indicates player was a starter in 2021 but missed all of 2022 due to injury.

== Preseason ==
=== Award watch lists ===
Listed in the order that they were released

Award	Player	Position	Year
Lott Trophy	Key Lawrence	CB	Jr.
Maxwell Award	Dillon Gabriel	QB	(redshirt) Jr.
Doak Walker Award	Eric Gray	RB	Sr.
Davey O'Brien Award	Dillion Gabriel	QB	(redshirt) Jr.
John Mackey Award	Brayden Willis	TE	GS
Biletnikoff Award	Marvin Mims	WR	Jr.
Butkus Award	David Ugwoegbu	LB	Sr.
Outland Trophy	Anton Harrison	OL	Jr.
Ray Guy Award	Michael Turk	P	(redshirt) Graduate
Wuerffel Trophy	Marvin Mims	WR	Jr.
Paul Hornung Award	Marvin Mims	WR	Jr.
Walter Camp Award	Dillion Gabriel	QB	(redshirt) Jr.
Rotary Lombardi Award	Chris Murray	OL	Graduate
Patrick Mannelly Award	Kasey Kelleher	LS	(redshirt) Graduate
Earl Campbell Tyler Rose Award	Marvin Mims	WR	Junior
Earl Campbell Tyler Rose Award	Theo Wease	WR	Junior
Polynesian College Football Player Of The Year Award	Jonah Laulu	DT	Sr.
Johnny Unitas Golden Arm Award	Dillon Gabriel	QB	(redshirt) Jr.

=== Big 12 media poll ===
The preseason poll was released on July 7, 2022.

- First place votes in ()

Big 12 media poll
Predicted finish	Team	Votes (1st place)
1	Baylor (17)	365
2	Oklahoma (12)	354
3	Oklahoma State (9)	342
4	Texas (2)	289
5	Kansas State	261
6	Iowa State (1)	180
7	TCU	149
8	West Virginia	147
9	Texas Tech	119
10	Kansas	48

=== Preseason Big-12 awards ===
2022 Preseason All-Big 12 teams

Big 12 Newcomer Player of the Year
Player	No.	Position	Class	Source
Dillon Gabriel	8	QB	S. Sr	

Position	Player	Class
Special teams
P	Michael Turk	S. Sr

== Schedule ==
Oklahoma and the Big 12 announced the 2022 football schedule on December 1, 2021. The 2022 schedule consists of 6 home games, 5 away games and 1 neutral-site game in the regular season. The Sooners will host 2 non-conference games against UTEP and Kent State and will travel to Nebraska. Oklahoma will host Kansas, Kansas State, Baylor and Oklahoma State, and travel to TCU, Iowa State, West Virginia, and Texas Tech in regular-season conference play. Oklahoma will play Texas in Dallas, Texas at the Cotton Bowl Stadium in the Red River Showdown, the 118th game played in the series.

Date	Time	Opponent	Rank	Site	TV	Result	Attendance
September 3	2:30 p.m.	UTEP*	No. 9	Gaylord Family Oklahoma Memorial Stadium; Norman, OK	FOX	W 45–13	83,173
September 10	6:00 p.m.	Kent State*	No. 7	Gaylord Family Oklahoma Memorial Stadium; Norman, OK	ESPN+	W 33–3	83,911
September 17	11:00 a.m.	at Nebraska*	No. 6	Memorial Stadium; Lincoln, NE (rivalry, Big Noon Kickoff)	FOX	W 49–14	87,161
September 24	7:00 p.m.	Kansas State	No. 6	Gaylord Family Oklahoma Memorial Stadium; Norman, OK (rivalry)	FOX	L 34–41	84,376
October 1	11:00 a.m.	at TCU	No. 18	Amon G. Carter Stadium; Fort Worth, TX	ABC	L 24–55	49,095
October 8	11:00 a.m.	vs. Texas		Cotton Bowl; Dallas, TX (Red River Showdown)	ABC	L 0–49	92,100
October 15	11:00 a.m.	No. 19 Kansas^{†}		Gaylord Family Oklahoma Memorial Stadium; Norman, OK	ESPN2	W 52–42	83,874
October 29	11:00 a.m.	at Iowa State		Jack Trice Stadium; Ames, IA	FS1	W 27–13	58,716
November 5	2:00 p.m.	Baylor		Gaylord Family Oklahoma Memorial Stadium; Norman, OK	ESPN+	L 35–38	83,546
November 12	11:00 a.m.	at West Virginia		Milan Puskar Stadium; Morgantown, WV	FS1	L 20–23	50,281
November 19	6:30 p.m.	No. 22 Oklahoma State		Gaylord Family Oklahoma Memorial Stadium; Norman, OK (Bedlam Series)	ABC	W 28–13	84,132
November 26	6:30 p.m.	at Texas Tech		Jones AT&T Stadium; Lubbock, TX	FS1	L 48–51 ^{OT}	51,126
December 29	4:30 p.m.	vs. No. 13 Florida State*		Camping World Stadium; Orlando, FL (Cheez-It Bowl)	ESPN	L 32–35	61,520
*Non-conference game; ^{†}Homecoming; Rankings from AP Poll (and CFP Rankings, after November 1) – Released prior to game; All times are in Central time

== Personnel ==
=== Roster ===
2022 Oklahoma Sooners Football
Quarterback: 5 Micah Bowens – (redshirt) sophomore (5'11, 189); 7 Nick Evers – freshman (6'3, 186); 8 Dillon Gabriel - (redshirt) Junior (5'11, 204); 11 Davis Beville – (redshirt) junior (6'6, 223); 14 General Booty – Sophomore (6'0, 186); 19 Ralph Rucker – (redshirt) freshman (5'11, 203); Running back: 0 Eric Gray – senior (5'10, 211); 2 Jovantae Barnes – freshman (6'0, 201); 21 Bentavious Thompson – (redshirt) senior (6'0, 190); 23 Todd Hudson – (redshirt) junior (5'7, 183); 24 Marcus Major – (redshirt) junior (6'0, 219); 25 Jaden Knowles – (redshirt) senior (5'8, 196); 27 Gavin Sawchuk – freshman (5'11, 185); 29 Tawee Walker – sophomore (5'9, 217); Wide receiver: 1 Jayden Gibson – freshman (6'5, 192); 3 Jalil Farooq – sophomore (6'1, 206); 4 Nic Anderson – freshman (6'2, 204); 6 Lv Bunkley-Shelton – (redshirt) sophomore (5'11, 198); 10 Theo Wease – (redshirt) junior (6'3, 200); 12 Drake Stoops – (redshirt) senior (5'10, 191); 13 J.J. Hester – (redshirt) sophomore (6'4, 196); 16 Brian Darby – junior (6'0, 207); 17 Marvin Mims – junior (5'11, 184); 81 Trevon West – junior (5'11, 178); 82 Gavin Freeman – freshman (5'8, 169); 83 Major Melson – (redshirt) sophomore (5'10, 182); 85 Davion Woolen – freshman (6'2, 185); 88 Dallas Duddley – freshman (6'2, 185); 89 Damon Smith – (redshirt) junior (6'1, 193); Tight end: 9 Brayden Willis – graduate (6'4, 239); 18 Kaden Helems – freshman (6'5, 225); 31 Jackson Sumlin – (redshirt) sophomore (6'2, 218); 80 Daniel Parker – graduate (6'2, 249); 84 Carsten Groos – (redshirt) sophomore (6'4, 242); 87 Jason Llewellyn – freshman (6'5, 254); Long snapper: 50 Ben Anderson – freshman (6'5, 237); 51 Kasey Kelleher – (redshirt) graduate (5'11, 228); 58 Ethan Lane – (redshirt) sophomore (5'11, 229)	Offensive line: 20 Clayton Smith – OL – (redshirt) Freshmen (6'4, 231); 55 Aaryn Parks – OL – (redshirt) Sophomore (6'4, 291); 56 Chris Murray – OL – graduate (6'2, 300); 57 Gunnar Allen – OL – freshman (6'0, 293); 59 Savion Byrd – OT – (redshirt) Freshman (6'5, 278); 60 Tyler Guyton – OL – (redshirt) sophomore (6'7, 315); 63 Kyle Ergenbright – OL – (redshirt) senior (6'5, 305); 64 Wanya Morris – OL – senior (6'6, 305); 66 Robert Congel – OL – (redshirt) graduate (6'5, 325); 69 Nate Anderson – OL – (redshirt) sophomore (6'4, 298); 70 Brey Walker – OL – (redshirt) senior (6'7, 359); 71 Anton Harrison – OL – junior (6'5, 315); 72 McKade Mettauer – OL – (redshirt) junior (6'4, 313); 73 Andrew Raym – OG – junior (6'4, 312); 74 Marcus Alexander – OL – (redshirt) junior (6'4, 331); 75 Cullen Montgomery – OL – (redshirt) freshman (6'4, 352); 76 Jacob Sexton – OL – freshman (6'6, 308); 78 Marcus Hicks – OT – (redshirt) junior (6'6, 301); 79 Jake Taylor – OL – Freshman (6'6, 293); Defensive line: 8 Jonah Laulu – DE – (redshirt) senior (6'5, 271); 14 Reggie Grimes II – DE – junior (6'4, 273); 19 Maureese Wren – DL – (redshirt) senior (6'3, 241); 31 Jalen Redmond – DL – (redshirt) junior (6'3, 298); 32 R Mason Thomas – DL – freshman (6'2, 222); 33 Marcus Stripling – DE – senior (6'3, 241); 40 Ethan Downs – DE – sophomore (6'4, 263); 44 Kelvin Gilliam – DL – (redshirt) freshman (6'3, 293); 45 Kevonte Henry – DL – freshman (6'4, 220); 53 Darius Graham – DL – freshman (6'2, 225); 56 Gracen Halton – DL – Freshman (6'2, 276); 77 Jeffery Johnson – DT – graduate (6'2, 313); 86 Cedric Roberts – DL – freshman (6'3, 275); 88 Jordan Kelley – DT – (redshirt) senior (6'4, 292); 90 Josh Ellison – DT – senior (6'3, 297); 91 Alton Tarber – DL – Freshman (6'2, 327); 92 Kori Roberson – DL – (redshirt) junior (6'3, 291); 93 Reed Lindsey – DL – (redshirt) junior (6'4, 272); 94 Isaiah Coe – DL – senior (6'2, 304); 98 Hayden Bray – DL – (redshirt) freshman (6'4, 271)	Linebacker: 2 David Ugwoegbu – senior (6'4, 237); 7 Jaren Kanak – freshman (6'2, 221); 10 Kip Lewis – freshman (6'1, 205); 11 Kobie McKinzie – freshman (6'2, 236); 13 Shane Whitter – junior (6'0, 225); 18 T.D. Roof – (redshirt) senior (5'10, 221); 22 Joseph Weté – (redshirt) junior (6'4, 230); 23 DaShaun White – graduate (6'0, 218); 28 Danny Stutsman – sophomore (6'4, 238); 41 Jake McCoy – (redshirt) junior (6'3, 231); Defensive back: 0 Woodi Washington – CB – (redshirt) junior (5'11, 193); 1 Joshua Eaton – CB – junior (6'1, 182); 3 Robert Spears-Jennings – S – (redshirt) Freshmen (6'1, 208); 4 Jaden Davis – CB – senior (5'10, 179); 5 Billy Bowman Jr. – DB – sophomore (5'10, 190); 6 Trey Morrison – DB – graduate (5'9, 189); 9 D.J. Graham – CB – junior (6'0, 195); 12 Key Lawrence – DB – junior (6'1, 204); 15 Bryson Washington – S – (redshirt) sophomore (6'2, 185); 16 Jamarrien Burt – DB – freshman (6'0, 179); 17 Damond Harmon – DB – sophomore (6'0, 175); 21 Kendall Dennis – DB – (redshirt) sophomore (5'11, 185); 24 Gentry Williams – DB – freshman (6'0, 170); 25 Justin Broiles – DB – (redshirt) graduate (5'11, 190); 26 Kani Walker – CB – (redshirt) Freshmen (6'2, 202); 27 Jayden Rowe – DB – freshman (6'2, 218); 29 Jordan Mukes – DB – sophomore (6'1, 205); 35 C.J. Coldon – DB – (redshirt) senior (5'11, 179); 36 Ty Taylor – CB – (redshirt) senior (5'11, 180); 37 Justin Harrington – DB – (redshirt) senior (6'3, 208); 38 Owen Heinecke – DB – (redshirt) Freshmen (6'2, 202); 39 Peter Schuh – DB – freshman (5'7, 176); 43 Ryan Peoples – CB – (redshirt) senior (5'11, 187); 46 Gabriel McDaniel – CB – (redshirt) sophomore (5'10, 165); 48 Eric Windham – CB – (redshirt) junior (5'10, 190); 49 Pierce Hudgens – DB – (redshirt) sophomore (6'1, 205); Placekicker: 34 Zach Schmit – (redshirt) sophomore (5'10, 187); 36 Josh Plaster – (redshirt) junior (6'0, 194); 46 Gavin Marshall – freshman (6'1, 194); Punter: 37 Michael Turk – (redshirt) graduate (6'0, 240); 47 Brady Braun – freshman (6'0, 235)

=== Coaching staff ===
Oklahoma Sooners football current coaching staff
Name	Position	Alma mater	Consecutive Years at Oklahoma
Brent Venables	Head coach	Kansas State (1992)	1st
Jeff Lebby	Offensive coordinator/quarterbacks	Oklahoma (2007)	1st
Ted Roof	Defensive coordinator/linebackers	Georgia Tech (1987)	1st
Todd Bates	Co-defensive coordinator/defensive tackles	Alabama (2004)	1st
L'Damian Washington	Wide Receivers (Interim)	Missouri (2014)	1st
DeMarco Murray	Running backs	Oklahoma (2010)	3rd
Joe Jon Finley	Tight Ends & H-Backs	Oklahoma (2008)	2nd
Bill Bedenbaugh	Offensive line	Iowa Wesleyan (1995)	10th
Miguel Chavis	Defensive ends	Clemson (2010)	1st
Brandon Hall	Safeties	Oklahoma (2000)	1st
Jay Valai	Cornerbacks	Wisconsin (2010)	1st
Jerry Schmidt	Director of Sports Enhancement/Strength and Conditioning	Nebraska (1986)	1st

=== Depth chart ===
Defense

FS
Key Lawrence
Justin Broiles
Robert Spears-Jennings

CHEETAH	MIKE	WILL
DaShaun White	David Ugwoegbu	Danny Stutsman
–	Jaren Kanak	Shane Whitter
–	–	–

SS
Billy Bowman
Trey Morrison
Damond Harmon

CB
Jaden Davis
Kendall Dennis
Joshua Eaton

DE	DT	DT	DE
Ethan Downs	Jordan Kelly	Jefferey Johnson	Reggie Grimes II
Jonah Laulu	Jalen Redmond	Isaiah Coe	Marcus Stripling
R Mason Thomas	Josh Ellison	Kelvin Gilliam	R. Mason Thomas

CB
Woodi Washington
D.J Graham
Kani Walker

Offense

WR-X
Theo Wease
Jayden Gibson
Trevon West

WR-Y / WR-A
Jalil Farooq
J.J. Hester
Nic Anderson
–

LT	LG	C	RG	RT
Anton Harrison	McKade Mettauer	Andrew Raym	Chris Murray	Wanya Morris
Tyler Guyton	Savion Byrd; Brey Walker	Robert Congel	Jake Taylor	Jacob Sexton
Aaryn Parks	–	Nate Anderson	Marcus Alexander	–

TE
Brayden Willis
Daniel Parker
Kaden Helms

WR-Z
Marvin Mims
Drake Stoops
LV Bunkley-Shelton

QB
Dillon Gabriel
Davis Beville
Nick Evers
General Booty

Key reserves
Offense
Defense
Special teams
Out (indefinitely)
Out (season)
Out (suspended)
Out (retired)

RB
Eric Gray
Marcus Major
Tawee Walker
Jovantae Barnes

Special teams
PK Zach Schmit
PK Gavin Marshall
P Michael Turk
P Josh Plaster
KR Billy Bowman
Marcus Major
Jaili Farooq
PR Marvin Mims
Eric Gray
LV Bunkley-Shelton
LS Kasey Kelleher
H Michael Turk

True Freshman

== Game summaries ==
=== Vs. UTEP ===
Uniform Combination
Helmet	Jersey	Pants

UTEP Miners (0–1, 0–1) v No. 9 Oklahoma Sooners (0–0, 0–0)

Quarter	1	2	3	4	Total
UTEP	0	10	0	3	13
No. 9 Oklahoma	21	7	14	3	45

at Gaylord Family Oklahoma Memorial Stadium • Norman, OK

- Date: Saturday, September 3, 2022
- Game time: 2:30 p.m. CDT
- Game weather: • Sunny Temperature: 96
- Game attendance: 83,173
- Referee: Tuta Salaam
- TV announcers (FOX): Jason Benetti (play-by-play) & Brock Huard (analyst)

Game information

First quarter

- (13:43) OKLA – Dillon Gabriel 12 yard rush, Zach Schmit kick (Drive: 5 plays, 75 yards, 1:17; OKLA 7–0)
- (9:18) OKLA – Dillon Gabriel 6 yard pass to Brayden Willis, Zach Schmit kick (Drive: 6 plays, 93 yards, 1:48; OKLA 14–0)
- (6:43) OKLA – Gavin Freeman 46 yard rush, Zach Schmit kick (2 plays, 55 yards, 00:30; OKLA 21–0)

Second quarter

- (14:12) UTEP – Gavin Baechle 49 yd FG (Drive: 14 plays, 49 yards, 7:31; OKLA 21–3)
- (8:18) UTEP – Ronald Awatt 2 yard rush, Gavin Baechle kick (Drive: 10 plays, 85 yards, 5:10; OKLA 21–10)
- (0:55) OKLA – Dillon Gabriel 28 yard pass to Brayden Willis, Zach Schmit kick (Drive: 11 plays, 68 yards, 4:01; OKLA 28–10)

Third quarter

- (10:48) OKLA – Marcus Major 1 yard rush, Zach Schmit kick (Drive: 10 plays, 80 yards, 2:40; OKLA 35–10)
- (3:16) OKLA – Marcus Major 6 yard rush, Zach Schmit kick (Drive: 7 plays, 64 yards, 1:51; OKLA 42–10)

Fourth quarter

- (14:01) UTEP – Gavin Baechle 54 yard FG (Drive: 11 plays, 38 yards, 4:15; OKLA 42–13)
- (5:17) OKLA – Zach Schmit 22 yard FG (Drive: 9 plays, 37 yards, 5:28; OKLA 45–13)

Statistics	UTEP	OKLA
First downs	25	23
Total yards	316	492
Rushes/yards	31/28	38/259
Passing yards	288	233
Passing: Comp–Att–Int	31–52–1	15–23
Time of possession	38:33	21:27

Team	Category	Player	Statistics
UTEP	Passing	Gavin Hardison	26/43, 244 yards
UTEP	Rushing	Ronald Awatt	12 carries, 39 yards, 1 TD
UTEP	Receiving	Tyrin Smith	8 receptions, 71 yards
Oklahoma	Passing	Dillon Gabriel	15/23, 233 yards, 2 TD's
Oklahoma	Rushing	Eric Gray	16 carries, 102 yards
Oklahoma	Receiving	Marvin Mims	3 receptions, 81 yards

=== Vs. Kent State ===
Uniform Combination
Helmet	Jersey	Pants

Kent State Golden Flashes (0–1, 0–0) v No. 7 Oklahoma Sooners (1–0, 0–0)

Quarter	1	2	3	4	Total
Kent State	0	3	0	0	3
No. 7 Oklahoma	0	7	24	2	33

at Gaylord Family Oklahoma Memorial Stadium • Norman, OK

- Date: Saturday, September 10, 2022
- Game time: 6:00 p.m. CDT
- Game weather: •Sunny Temperature: 87
- Game attendance: 83,911
- Referee: Steve Baron
- TV announcers (ESPN+): Mike Morgan (play-by-play), Ryan Leaf (analyst) & Alex Chappell (sideline)

Game information

First quarter

- No Score

Second quarter

- (8:27) KEST – Andrew Glass 37 yard FG (Drive: 15 plays, 72 yards, 7:21; KEST 3–0)
- (0:18) OKLA – Dillon Gabriel 36 yard pass to Marvin Mims, Zach Schmit kick (Drive: 5 plays, 76 yards, 00:52; OKLA 7–3)

Third quarter

- (12:41) OKLA – Marcus Major 16 yards rush, Zach Schmit kick (Drive: 7 plays, 68 yards, 2:13; OKLA 14–3)
- (9:51) OKLA – Zach Schmit 25 yard FG (Drive: 7 plays, 26 yards, 1:39; OKLA 17–3)
- (5:31) OKLA – Dillon Gabriel 18 yards pass to Drake Stoops, Zach Schmit kick (Drive: 4 plays, 80 yards, 00:58; OKLA 24–3)
- (1:35) OKLA – Dillon Gabriel 58 yard pass to Marvin Mims, Zach Schmit kick (Drive: 3 plays, 82 yards, 00:33; OKLA 31–3)

Fourth quarter

- (12:00) OKLA – Safety (OKLA 33–3)

Statistics	KEST	OKLA
First downs	20	20
Total yards	295	430
Rushes/yards	52/164	36/134
Passing yards	131	296
Passing: Comp–Att–Int	11–21–1	21–28
Time of possession	36:19	23:41

Team	Category	Player	Statistics
Kent State	Passing	Collin Schlee	11/19, 131 yards
Kent State	Rushing	Marquez Cooper	22 carries, 55 yards
Kent State	Receiving	Dante Cephas	4 receptions, 50 yards
Oklahoma	Passing	Dillon Gabriel	21/28, 296 yards, 3 TD's
Oklahoma	Rushing	Eric Gray	10 carries, 71 yards
Oklahoma	Receiving	Marvin Mims	7 receptions, 163 yards, 2 TD's

=== At Nebraska ===
Uniform Combination
Helmet	Jersey	Pants

No. 6 Oklahoma Sooners (2–0, 0–0) v Nebraska Cornhuskers (1–2, 0–1)

Quarter	1	2	3	4	Total
No. 6 Oklahoma	14	21	14	0	49
Nebraska	7	0	0	7	14

at Memorial Stadium • Lincoln, NE

- Date: Saturday, September 17, 2022
- Game time: 11:00 a.m. CDT
- Game weather: • Cloudy Temperature: 69
- Game attendance: 87,161
- Referee: David Alvarez
- TV announcers (FOX): Gus Johnson Brady Quinn (Fill In for Gus Johnson who Left at the Half Sick) (Play-by-Play), Joel Klatt (analyst), Jenny Taft (sideline)

Game information

First quarter

- (11:19) NEB – Casey Thompson 32 yard pass to Trey Palmer, Timmy Bleekrode kick (Drive: 6 plays, 77 yards, 1:57; NEB 7–0)
- (9:30) OKLA – Dillon Gabriel 61 yard rush, Zach Schmit kick (Drive: 5 plays, 75 yards, 1:49; Tied 7–7)
- (1:57) OKLA – Dillon Gabriel 25 yard pass to Jalil Farooq, Zach Schmit kick (Drive: 7 plays, 63 yards, 2:17; OU 14–7)

Second quarter

- (14:48) OKLA – Marcus Major 1 yard rush, Zach Schmit kick (Drive: 5 plays, 23 yards, 0:55; OU 21–7)
- (11:35) OKLA – Brayden Willis 24 yard pass to Marcus Major, Zach Schmit kick (Drive: 6 plays, 63 yards, 1:55; OU 28–7)
- (1:44) OKLA – Eric Gray 16 yard rush, Zach Schmit kick (Drive: 5 plays, 65 yards, 1:10; OU 35–7)

Third quarter

- (13:13) OKLA – Eric Gray 21 yard rush, Zach Schmit kick (Drive: 7 plays, 46 yards, 1:41; OU 42–7)
- (8:59) OKLA – Dillon Gabriel 15 yard pass to Theo Wease, Zach Schmit kick (Drive: 9 plays, 60 yards, 3:10; OU 49–7)

Fourth quarter

- (3:17) NEB – Chubba Purdy 8 yard rush, Timmy Bleekrode kick (Drive: 13 plays, 82 yards, 5:04; OU 49–14)

Statistics	OKLA	NEB
First downs	31	21
Total yards	580	327
Rushes/yards	54/312	45/163
Passing yards	258	164
Passing: Comp–Att–Int	19–30	21–31–1
Time of possession	29:36	30:24

Team	Category	Player	Statistics
Oklahoma	Passing	Dillon Gabriel	16/27, 230 yards, 2 TD's
Oklahoma	Rushing	Eric Gray	11 carries, 113 yards, 2 TD's
Oklahoma	Receiving	Marvin Mims	4 receptions, 66 yards
Nebraska	Passing	Casey Thompson	14/20, 129 yards, 1 TD
Nebraska	Rushing	Gabe Ervin Jr.	7 carries, 60 yards
Nebraska	Receiving	Trey Palmer	10 receptions, 92 yards, 1 TD

=== vs Kansas State ===
Uniform Combination
Helmet	Jersey	Pants

Kansas State Wildcats (2–1, 0–0) v No. 6 Oklahoma Sooners (3–0, 0–0)

Quarter	1	2	3	4	Total
Kansas State	14	10	3	14	41
No. 6 Oklahoma	7	10	3	14	34

at Gaylord Family Oklahoma Memorial Stadium • Norman, OK

- Date: Saturday, September 24, 2022
- Game time: 7:00 p.m. CDT
- Game weather: • Cloudy Temperature: 88
- Game attendance: 84,376
- Referee: Kevin Mar
- TV announcers (FOX): Jason Benetti (play-by-play), Brock Huard (analyst), Allison Williams (sideline)

Game information

First quarter

- (9:57) KSU – Adrian Martinez 6 yard rush, Chris Tennant kick (Drive: 12 plays, 75 yards, 5:03; KSU 7–0)
- (5:37) KSU – Adrian Martinez 6 yard pass to Malik Knowles, Chris Tennant kick (Drive: 7 plays, 80 yards, 3:11; KSU 14–0)
- (2:32) OKLA – Dillon Gabriel 56 yard pass to Theo Wease, Zach Schmit kick (Drive: 3 plays, 70 yards, 0:52; KSU 14–7)

Second quarter

- (12:24) OKLA – Dillon Gabriel 50 yard pass to Marvin Mims, Zach Schmit kick (Drive: 4 plays, 63 yards, 1:09; Tied 14–14)
- (6:15) KSU – Adrian Martinez 3 yard rush, Chris Tennant kick (Drive: 11 plays, 42 yards, 5:59; KSU 21–14)
- (2:47) OKLA – Zach Schmit 41 yard FG (Drive: 8 plays, 51 yards, 3:28; KSU 21–17)
- (0:00) KSU – Chris Tennant 23 yard FG (Drive: 10 plays, 70 yards, 2:47; KSU 24–17)

Third quarter

- (11:42) OKLA – Zach Schmit 44 yard FG (Drive: 8 plays, 48 yards, 3:18; KSU 24–20)
- (3:24) KSU – Chris Tennant 29 yard FG (Drive: 11 plays, 69 yards, 3:53; KSU 27–20)

Fourth quarter

- (8:00) KSU – Adrian Martinez 15 yard rush, Chris Tennant kick (Drive: 8 plays, 80 yards, 3:45; KSU 34–20)
- (4:36) OKLA – Dillon Gabriel 1 yard pass to Brayden Willis, Zach Schmit kick (Drive: 9 plays, 75 yards, 3:24; KSU 34–27)
- (1:58) KSU – Adrian Martinez 1 yard rush, Chris Tennant kick (Drive: 7 plays, 75 yards, 2:38; KSU 41–27)
- (0:35) OKLA – Dillon Gabriel 10 yard pass to Brayden Willis, Zach Schmit kick (Drive: 12 plays, 75 yards, 1:23; KSU 41–34)

Statistics	KSU	OKLA
First downs	28	26
Total yards	509	550
Rushes/yards	49/275	34/220
Passing yards	234	330
Passing: Comp–Att–Int	21–34	26–39
Time of possession	33:46	24:56

Team	Category	Player	Statistics
Kansas State	Passing	Adrian Martinez	21/34, 234 yards, 1 TD
Kansas State	Rushing	Adrian Martinez	21 carries, 148 yards, 4 TD's
Kansas State	Receiving	Phillip Brooks	7 receptions, 56 yards
Oklahoma	Passing	Dillon Gabriel	26/39, 330 yards, 4 TD's
Oklahoma	Rushing	Eric Gray	16 carries, 114 yards
Oklahoma	Receiving	Eric Gray	7 receptions, 45 yards

=== At TCU ===
Uniform Combination
Helmet	Jersey	Pants

No. 18 Oklahoma Sooners (3–1, 0–1) vs. TCU Horned Frogs (3–0, 0–0)

Quarter	1	2	3	4	Total
No. 18 Oklahoma	10	7	0	7	24
TCU	27	14	14	0	55

at Amon G. Carter Stadium • Fort Worth, TX

- Date: Saturday, October 1, 2022
- Game time: 11:00 a.m CDT
- Game weather: • Sunny Temperature: 72
- Game attendance: 49,094
- Referee: Tuta Salaam
- TV announcers (ABC): Mark Jones (play-by-play), Robert Griffin III (analyst), Quint Kessenich (sideline)

Game information

First Quarter

- (12:45) TCU – Max Duggan 19 yard pass to Savion Williams, Griffin Kell kick (Drive: 4 plays, 46 yards, 1:18; TCU 7–0)
- (9:49) OKLA – Zach Schmit 43 yard FG (Drive: 5 plays, 19 yards, 0:56; TCU 7–3)
- (8:35) TCU – Max Duggan 73 yard pass to Taye Barber, Griffin Kell XP Failed (Drive: 3 plays, 75 yards, 1:14; TCU 13–3)
- (7:17) TCU – Max Duggan 67 yard rush, Griffin Kell kick (Drive: 1 play, 67 yards, 0:11; TCU 20–3)
- (2:15) OKLA – Eric Gray 1 yard rush, Zach Schmit kick (Drive: 4 plays, 76 yards, 1:32; TCU 20–10)
- (0:07) TCU – Kendre Miller 15 yard rush, Griffin Kell kick (Drive: 6 plays, 75 yards, 2:08; TCU 27–10)

Second Quarter

- (10:30) TCU – Emari Demercado 1 yard rush, Griffin Kell kick (Drive: 9 plays, 89 yards, 3:50; TCU 34–10)
- (8:49) OKLA – Jovantae Barnes 20 yard rush, Zach Schmit kick (Drive: 7 plays, 65 yards, 1:41; TCU 34–17)
- (1:34) TCU – Max Duggan 62 yard pass to Gunnar Henderson, Griffin Kell kick (Drive: 6 plays, 89 yards, 2:28; TCU 41–17)

Third Quarter

- (9:30) TCU – Kendre Miller 69 yard rush, Griffin Kell kick (Drive: 3 plays, 80 yards, 1:09; TCU 48–17)
- (1:40) TCU – Max Duggan 2 yard rush, Griffin Kell kick (Drive: 6 plays, 67 yards, 2:49; TCU 55–17)

Fourth Quarter

- (11:24) OKLA – Jovantae Barns 1 yard rush, Zach Schmit kick (Drive: 14 plays, 73 yards, 5:10; TCU 55–24)

Statistics	OKLA	TCU
First downs	22	29
Total yards	355	668
Rushes/yards	49/179	41/361
Passing yards	176	307
Passing: Comp–Att–Int	14–32	24–34
Time of possession	27:11	32:49

Team	Category	Player	Statistics
Oklahoma	Passing	Dillon Gabriel	7/16, 126 yards
Oklahoma	Rushing	Jovantae Barnes	18 carries, 100 yards, 2 TD's
Oklahoma	Receiving	Marvin Mims	4 receptions, 41 yards
TCU	Passing	Max Duggan	23/33, 302 yards, 3 TD's
TCU	Rushing	Kendre Miller	13 carries, 136 yards, 2 TD's
TCU	Receiving	Derius Davis	7 receptions, 32 yards

=== Vs. Texas ===
Uniform Combination
Helmet	Jersey	Pants

Texas Longhorns (3–2, 1–1) vs. Oklahoma Sooners (3–2, 0–2)

Quarter	1	2	3	4	Total
Texas	7	21	14	7	49
Oklahoma	0	0	0	0	0

at Cotton Bowl • Dallas, TX

- Date: Saturday, October 8, 2022
- Game time: 11:00 a.m. CDT
- Game weather: Sunny • Temperature: 71 °F (22 °C) • Wind: SW 8 miles per hour (13 km/h)
- Game attendance: 92,100
- Referee: Derek Anderson
- TV announcers (ABC): Joe Tessitore (play-by-play), Greg McElroy (analyst) & Katie George (sideline)

Game information

First Quarter

- (6:48) TEX – Bijan Robinson 2 yard rush, Bert Auburn kick (Drive: 12 plays, 90 yards, 4:31; UT 7–0)

Second Quarter

- (12:40) TEX – Quinn Ewers 10 yard pass to Xavier Worthy, Bert Auburn kick (Drive: 8 plays, 92 yards, 3:03; UT 14–0)
- (7:31) TEX – Quinn Ewers 15 yard pass to Keilan Robinson, Bert Aurburn kick (Drive: 9 plays, 80 yards, 3:10; UT 21–0)
- (0:18) TEX – Quinn Ewers 24 yard pass to Ja'Tavion Sanders, Bert Auburn kick (Drive: 9 plays, 79 yards, 2:48; UT 28–0)

Third Quarter

- (5:01) TEX – Bijan Robinson 11 yard rush, Bert Auburn kick (Drive: 7 plays, 76 yards, 3:07; UT 35–0)
- (1:57) TEX – Quinn Ewers 18 yard pass to Ja'Tavion Sanders, Bert Auburn kick (Drive: 6 plays, 47 yards, 2:07; UT 42–0)

Fourth Quarter

- (12:11) TEX – Jonathon Brooks 18 yard rush, Bert Auburn kick (Drive: 5 plays, 54 yards, 2:37; UT 49–0)

Statistics	TEX	OKLA
First downs	36	11
Total yards	585	195
Rushes/yards	50/296	42/156
Passing yards	289	39
Passing: Comp–Att–Int	21–31	9–17–2
Time of possession	32:59	27:01

Team	Category	Player	Statistics
Texas	Passing	Quinn Ewers	21/31, 289 yards, 4 TD's, 1 INT
Texas	Rushing	Bijan Robinson	22 carries, 130 yards, 2 TD's
Texas	Receiving	Jordan Whittington	5 receptions, 97 yards,
Oklahoma	Passing	Davis Beville	6/12, 38 yards, 1 INT
Oklahoma	Rushing	Jalil Farooq	5 carries, 60 yards
Oklahoma	Receiving	Brayden Willis	2 receptions, 25 yards

=== Vs. No. 19 Kansas ===
Uniform Combination
Helmet	Jersey	Pants

No. 19 Kansas Jayhwaks (5–1, 2–1) vs. Oklahoma Sooners (3–3, 0–3)

Quarter	1	2	3	4	Total
No.19 Kansas	14	7	7	14	42
Oklahoma	14	21	14	3	52

at Gaylord Family Oklahoma Memorial Stadium • Norman, OK

- Date: Saturday, October 15, 2022
- Game time: 11:00 a.m. CDT
- Game weather: • Sunny Temperature: 72
- Game attendance: 83,874
- Referee: David Alvarez
- TV announcers (ESPN2): Dave Flemming (play-by-play), Rod Gilmore (analyst) & Tiffany Blackmon (sideline)

Game information

First Quarter

- (12:14) OKLA – Jovantae Barnes 1 yard rush, Zach Schmit kick (Drive: 10 plays, 79 yards, 2:41; OU 7–0)
- (9:35) KAN – Jason Bean 39 yard pass to Lawrence Arnold, Jacob Borcila kick (Drive: 6 plays, 75 yards, 2:39; Tied 7–7)
- (7:13) OKLA – Eric Gray 2 yard rush, Zach Schmit kick (Drive: 9 plays, 75 yards, 2:22; OU 14–7)
- (2:39) KAN – Devin Neal 11 yard rush, Jacob Borcila kick (Drive: 9 plays, 65 yards, 4:28; Tied 14–14)

Second Quarter

- (14:26) OKLA – Jovantae Barnes 6 yard rush, Zach Schmit kick (Drive: 5 plays, 80 yards, 0:57; OU 21–14)
- (5:42) OKLA – Dillon Gabriel 24 yard pass to Theo Wease, Zach Schmit kick (Drive: 7 plays, 65 yards, 2:12; OU 28–14)
- (2:40) OKLA – Eric Gray 28 yard rush, Zach Schmit kick (Drive: 3 plays, 54 yards, 00:49; OU 35–14)
- (1:36) KAN – Jason Bean 18 yard pass to Mason Fairchild, Jacob Borcila kick (Drive: 4 plays, 75 yards, 1:04; OU 35–21)

Third Quarter

- (10:16) OKLA – Dillon Gabriel 1 yard rush, Zach Schmit kick (Drive: 9 plays, 47 yards, 2:33; OU 42–21)
- (5:56) KAN – Jason Bean 28 yard pass to Lawrence Arnold, Jacob Borcila kick (Drive: 3 plays, 47 yards, 00:53; OU 42–28)
- (2:36) OKLA – Dillon Gabriel 26 yard pass to Brayden Willis, Zach Schmit kick (Drive: 10 plays, 75 yards, 3:20; OU 49–28)

Fourth Quarter

- (10:33) KAN – Ky Thomas 1 yard rush, Jacob Borcila kick (Drive: 7 plays, 28 yards, 3:36; OU 49–35)
- (5:18) OKLA – Zach Schmit 37 yard FG (Drive: 16 plays, 55 yards, 5:15; OU 52–35)
- (3:31) KAN – Jason Bean 9 yard pass to Mason Fairchild, Jacob Borcila kick (Drive: 7 plays, 75 yards, 1:47; OU 52–42)

Statistics	KAN	OKLA
First downs	22	36
Total yards	430	701
Rushes/yards	35/165	57/298
Passing yards	265	403
Passing: Comp–Att–Int	16–27–2	29–43–1
Time of possession	29:41	30:19

Team	Category	Player	Statistics
Kansas	Passing	Jason Bean	16/27, 265 yards, 4 TD's, 2 INT's
Kansas	Rushing	Devin Neal	12 carries, 83 yards, 1 TD
Kansas	Receiving	Mason Fairchild	6 receptions, 106 yards, 2 TD
Oklahoma	Passing	Dillon Gabriel	29/42, 403 yards, 2 TD's, 1 INT
Oklahoma	Rushing	Eric Gray	20 carries, 176 yards, 2 TD
Oklahoma	Receiving	Marvin Mims	9 receptions, 106 yards

=== At Iowa State ===
Uniform Combination
Helmet	Jersey	Pants

Oklahoma Sooners (4–3, 1–3) vs. Iowa State Cyclones (3–4, 0–4)

Quarter	1	2	3	4	Total
Oklahoma	3	10	7	7	27
Iowa State	3	3	0	7	13

at Jack Trice Stadium• Ames, IA

- Date: Saturday, October 29, 2022
- Game time: 11:00 a.m. CDT
- Game weather: • Sunny Temperature: 52
- Game attendance: 58,716
- Referee: Steve Baron
- TV announcers (FS1): Noah Eagle (play-by-play) & Mark Helfrich (analyst)

Game information

First Quarter

- (6:31) OKLA – Zach Schmit 41 yard FG (Drive: 6 plays, 22 yards, 2:01; OU 3–0)
- (2:08) ISU – Jace Gilbert 27 yard FG (Drive: 11 plays, 66 yards, 4:23; Tied 3–3)

Second Quarter

- (12:23) OKLA – Michael Turk 2 yard pass to Zach Schmit, Zach Schmit kick (Drive: 15 plays, 85 yards, 4:38; OU 10–3)
- (6:34) OKLA – Zach Schmit 34 yard FG (Drive: 14 plays, 48 yards, 5:31; OU 13–3)
- (0:45) ISU – Jace Gilbert 43 yard FG (Drive: 7 plays, 25 yards, 1:10; OU 13–6)

Third Quarter

- (4:18) OKLA – Dillon Gabriel 41 yard pass to Jalil Farooq, Zach Schmit kick (Drive: 8 plays, 78 yards, 2:47; OU 20–6)

Fourth Quarter

- (10:29) ISU – Hunter Dekkers 15 yard pass to Jaylin Noel, Drake Nettles kick (Drive: 12 plays, 53 yards, 4:53; OU 20–13)
- (4:36) OKLA – Eric Gray 4 yard rush, Zach Schmit kick (Drive: 2 plays, 2 yards, 0:48; OU 27–13)

Statistics	OKLA	ISU
First downs	19	20
Total yards	332	378
Rushes/yards	47/182	27/66
Passing yards	150	312
Passing: Comp–Att–Int	16–27	37–57–3
Time of possession	29:15	30:45

Team	Category	Player	Statistics
Oklahoma	Passing	Dillon Gabriel	15/26, 148 yards, 1 TD
Oklahoma	Rushing	Eric Gray	20 carries, 101 yards, 1 TD
Oklahoma	Receiving	Jalil Farooq	4 receptions, 74 yards, 1 TD
Iowa State	Passing	Hunter Dekkers	37/57, 312 yards, 1 TD, 3 INT's
Iowa State	Rushing	Hunter Dekkers	4 carries, 31 yards,
Iowa State	Receiving	Xavier Hutchinson	10 receptions, 72 yards

=== vs Baylor ===
Uniform Combination
Helmet	Jersey	Pants

Baylor Bears (5–3, 3–2) vs. Oklahoma Sooners (5–3, 2–3)

Quarter	1	2	3	4	Total
Baylor	14	10	7	7	38
Oklahoma	14	7	7	7	35

at Gaylord Family Oklahoma Memorial Stadium • Norman, OK

- Date: Saturday, November 5, 2022
- Game time: 2:00 p.m. CDT
- Game weather: •Sunny Temperature: 57
- Game attendance: 83,546
- Referee: Kevin Boitmann
- TV announcers (ESPN+): Courtney Lyle (play-by-play), Ryan Leaf (analyst) & Tori Petry (sideline)

Game information

First Quarter

- (11:13) OKLA – Dillon Gabriel 10 yard rush, Zach Schmit kick (Drive: 10 plays, 75 yards, 3:47; OU 7–0)
- (5:54) BAY – Craig Williams 11 yard rush, John Mayers kick (Drive: 11 plays, 63 yards, 5:11; Tied 7–7)
- (3:50) BAY – Jordan Nabors 6 yard rush, John Mayers kick (Drive: 3 plays, 26 yards, 1:11; BU 14–7)
- (3:01) OKLA – Dillon Gabriel 63 yard pass to Marvin Mims, Zach Schmit kick (Drive: 3 plays, 75 yards, 0:49; Tied 14–14)

Second Quarter

- (12:59) BAY – John Mayers 49 yard FG (Drive: 4 plays, 2 yards, 1:51; BU 17–14)
- (9:06) BAY – Craig Williams 1 yard rush, John Mayers kick (Drive: 4 plays, 65 yards, 1:56; BU 24–14)
- (6:46) OKLA – Eric Gray 5 yard rush, Zach Schmit kick (Drive: 9 plays, 75 yards, 2:20; BU 24–21)

Third Quarter

- (10:56) BAY – Richard Reese 2 yard rush, John Mayers kick (Drive: 9 plays, 75 yards, 4:04; BU 31–21)
- (4:42) OKLA – Dillon Gabriel 9 yard pass to Drake Stoops, Zach Schmit kick (Drive: 7 plays, 77 yards, 2:16; BU 31–28)

Fourth Quarter

- (9:15) BAY – Qualan Jones 10 yard rush, John Mayers kick (Drive: 11 plays, 80 yards, 5:35; BU 38–28)
- (4:05) OKLA – Eric Gray 1 yard rush, Zach Schmit kick (Drive: 13 plays, 75 yards, 5:10; BU 38–35)

Statistics	BAY	OKLA
First downs	24	29
Total yards	413	499
Rushes/yards	48/281	45/238
Passing yards	132	261
Passing: Comp–Att–Int	14–23–1	22–24–3
Time of possession	33:42	26:18

Team	Category	Player	Statistics
Baylor	Passing	Blake Shapen	14/23, 132 yards, 1 INT
Baylor	Rushing	Craig Williams	25 carries, 192 yards, 2 TD
Baylor	Receiving	Josh Cameron	5 receptions, 72 yards
Oklahoma	Passing	Dillon Gabriel	22/34, 261 yards, 2 TD's, 3 INT's
Oklahoma	Rushing	Eric Gray	23 carries, 106 yards, 2 TD
Oklahoma	Receiving	Eric Gray	8 receptions, 58 yards

=== At West Virginia ===
Uniform Combination
Helmet	Jersey	Pants

Oklahoma Sooners (5–4, 2–4) v. West Virginia Mountaineers (3–6, 1–5)

Quarter	1	2	3	4	Total
Oklahoma	0	12	8	0	20
West Virginia	0	6	7	10	23

at Milan Puskar Stadium • Morgantown, WV

- Date: Saturday, November 12, 2022
- Game time: 11:00 a.m. CST
- Game weather: • Cloudy Temperature: 51
- Game attendance: 50,281
- Referee: David Alvarez
- TV announcers (FS1): Adam Alexander (play-by-play), Devin Gardner (analysts)

Game information

First Quarter

- No Score

Second Quarter

- (9:42) OKLA – Zach Schmit 32 yard FG (Drive: 9 plays, 75 yards, 3:18; OU 3–0)
- (1:06) OKLA – Eric Gray 12 yard rush, Zach Schmit kick (Drive: 4 plays, 96 yards, 1:02; OU 10–0)
- (0:33) WVU – Garrett Greene 5 yard rush, 2 point conversation failed (Drive: 3 plays, 53 yards, 0:26; OU 10–6)
- (0:33) OKLA – Billy Bowman Defensive PAT Conversion (Drive: 1 play, 88 yards; OU 12–6)

Third Quarter

- (3:36) WVU – Garrett Greene 8 yard pass to Bryce Ford – Wheaton, Casey Legg Kick (Drive: 12 plays, 63 yards, 6:18; WVU 13–12)
- (1:22) OKLA – Eric Gray 5 yard rush, Dillion Gabriel rush for 2 point conversion (Drive: 7 plays, 59 yards, 2:07; OU 20–13)

Fourth Quarter

- (11:20) WVU – Garrett Greene 11 yard rush, Casey Legg Kick (Drive: 12 plays, 72 yards, 4:57; Tied 20–20)
- (0:00) WVU – Casey Legg 25 yard FG (Drive: 15 plays, 65 yards, 6:24; WVU 23–20)

Statistics	OKLA	WVU
First downs	22	25
Total yards	426	406
Rushes/yards	40/236	53/203
Passing yards	190	230
Passing: Comp–Att–Int	17–28	19–34–1
Time of possession	22:45	37:15

Team	Category	Player	Statistics
Oklahoma	Passing	Dillon Gabriel	17/28, 190 yards
Oklahoma	Rushing	Eric Gray	25 carries, 211 yards, 2 TD's
Oklahoma	Receiving	Jalil Farooq	5 receptions, 49 yards
West Virginia	Passing	Garrett Greene	12/22, 138 yards, 1 TD
West Virginia	Rushing	Garrett Greene	14 carries, 119 yards, 2 TD
West Virginia	Receiving	Bryce Ford-Wheaton	7 receptions, 36 yards, 1 TD

=== vs No. 22 Oklahoma State ===
Uniform Combination
Helmet	Jersey	Pants

No. 22 Oklahoma State Cowboys (7–3, 4–3) v. Oklahoma Sooners (5–5, 2–5)

Quarter	1	2	3	4	Total
No. 22 Oklahoma State	0	3	7	3	13
Oklahoma	28	0	0	0	28

at Gaylord Family Oklahoma Memorial Stadium • Norman, OK

- Date: Saturday, November 19, 2022
- Game time: 6:30 p.m. CST
- Game weather: • Clear Temperature: 35
- Game attendance: 84,132
- Referee: Michael Vandervelde
- TV announcers (ABC): Dave Pasch (play-by-play), Dusty Dvoracek (analyst) & Tom Luginbill (sideline)

Game information

First Quarter

- (13:43) OKLA – Dillon Gabriel 2 yard rush, Zach Schmit Kick (Drive: 6 plays, 75 yards, 1:17; OU 7–0)
- (9:44) OKLA – Dillon Gabriel 30 yard pass to Jalil Farooq, Zach Schmit kick (Drive: 9 plays, 93 yards, 2:45; OU 14–0)
- (7:57) OKLA – Eric Gray 2 yard rush, Zach Schmit kick (Drive: 2 plays, 4 yards, 0:18; OU 21–0)
- (1:09) OKLA – Dillon Gabriel 23 yard pass to Drake Stoops, Zach Schmit kick (Drive: 5 plays, 75 yards, 1:31; OU 28–0)

Second Quarter

- (4:05) OSU – Tanner Brown 24 yard FG (Drive: 10 plays, 48 yards, 4:34; OU 28–3)

Third Quarter

- (1:03) OSU – Spencer Sanders 2 yard pass to Quinton Stewart, Tanner Brown kick (Drive: 7 plays, 61 yards, 2:17; OU 28–10)

Fourth Quarter

- (12:38) OSU – Tanner Brown 25 yard FG (Drive: 6 plays, 59 yards, 2:15; OU 28–13)

Statistics	OKST	OKLA
First downs	26	17
Total yards	484	434
Rushes/yards	35/103	34/175
Passing yards	381	259
Passing: Comp–Att–Int	36–67–4	20–40–1
Time of possession	37:38	22:22

Team	Category	Player	Statistics
Oklahoma State	Passing	Spencer Sanders	36/67, 381 yards, 1 TD, 4 INT's
Oklahoma State	Rushing	Spencer Sanders	17 carries, 42 yards
Oklahoma State	Receiving	Brennan Presley	9 receptions, 118 yards
Oklahoma	Passing	Dillon Gabriel	20/40, 259 yards, 2 TD's 1 INT
Oklahoma	Rushing	Eric Gray	20 carries, 90 yards, 1 TD
Oklahoma	Receiving	Drake Stoops	6 receptions, 89 yards, 1 TD

=== At Texas Tech ===
Uniform Combination
Helmet	Jersey	Pants

Oklahoma Sooners (6–5, 3–5) v. Texas Tech Red Raiders (6–5, 4–4)

Quarter	1	2	3	4	OT	Total
Oklahoma	14	10	7	17	0	48
Texas Tech	0	23	15	10	3	51

at Jones AT&T Stadium • Lubbock, TX

- Date: Saturday, November 26, 2022
- Game time: 6:30 p.m. CST
- Game weather: • Clear Temperature: 43
- Game attendance: 51,126
- Referee: Derek Anderson
- TV announcers (FS1): Eric Collins (play-by-play), Devin Gardner (analyst)

Game information

First Quarter

- (13:19) OKLA – Dillon Gabriel 37 yard pass to Marvin Mims (Zach Schmit kick) (Drive: 4 plays, 45 yards, 1:19; OKLA 7–0)
- (9:24) OKLA – Dillon Gabriel 7 yard pass to Brayden Willis (Zach Schit kick) (Drive: 11 plays, 93 yards, 2:58; OKLA 14–0)

Second Quarter

- (13:04) OKLA – Zach Schmit 41 yard FG (13 plays, 64 yards, 4:47; OKLA 17–0)
- (9:45) TTU – Jaylan Hutchings 1 yard rush (kick failed) (11 plays, 75 yards, 3:19; OKLA 17–6)
- (6:25) OKLA – Dillon Gabriel 77 yard pass to Marvin Mims Jr. (Zach Schmit kick) (Drive: 1 play, 77 yards, 0:13; OKLA 24–6)
- (3:09) TTU – SaRodorick Thompson 6 yard rush (Trey Wolff kick) (Drive: 10 plays, 75 yards, 3:16; OKLA 24–13)
- (1:28) TTU – Donovan Smith 6 yard rush (Trey Wolff kick) (Drive: 4 plays, 29 yards, 0:48; OKLA 24–20)
- (0:00) TTU – Trey Wolff 29 yard FG (Drive: 8 plays, 77 yards, 1:28; OKLA 24–23)

Third Quarter

- (10:52) TTU – SaRodorick Thompson 7 yard rush (Trey Wolff kick) (Drive: 5 plays, 62 yards, 1:55; TTU 30–24)
- (10:09) OKLA – Dillon Gabriel 61 yard pass to Theo Wease (Zach Schmit kick) (Drive: 3 plays, 75 yards, 0:43; OKLA 31–30)
- (2:46) TTU – Tyler Shough 15 yard pass to Donovan Smith (Trey Wolff kick) (Drive: 7 plays, 62 yards, 3:20; TTU 38–31)

Fourth Quarter

- (10:37) OKLA – Dillon Gabriel 5 yard pass to Brayden Willis (Zach Schmit kick) (Drive: 6 plays, 75 yards, 2:25; Tied 38–38)
- (8:43) TTU – Tyler Shough 44 yard pass to Jerand Bradley (Trey Wolff kick) (Drive: 5 plays, 75 yards, 1:54; TTU 45–38)
- (7:24) OKLA – Dillon Gabriel 1 yard pass to Jalil Parooq (Zach Schmit kick) (Drive: 5 plays, 75 yards, 1:19; Tied 45–45)
- (4:04) OKLA – Zach Schmit 42 yard FG (Drive: 4 plays, 8 yards, 1:12; OKLA 48–45)
- (0:03) TTU – Trey Wolff 43 yard FG (Drive: 13 plays, 50 yards, 4:01; Tied 48–48)

Overtime

- (0:00) TTU – Trey Wolff 35 yard FG (Drive: 4 plays, 8 yards, 0:00; TTU 51–48)

Statistics	OKLA	TTU
First downs	28	31
Total yards	672	599
Rushes/yards	210	163
Passing yards	462	436
Passing: Comp–Att–Int	28–40–1	31–50–1
Time of possession	27:26	32:34

Team	Category	Player	Statistics
Oklahoma	Passing	Dilon Gabriel	28–40, 449 yards, 6 TDs, 1 INT
Oklahoma	Rushing	Eric Gray	28 carries, 161 yards
Oklahoma	Receiving	Marvin Mims	5 receptions 162 yards 2 TDs
Texas Tech	Passing	Tyler Shough	31–50, 436 yards, 2 TDs, 1 INT
Texas Tech	Rushing	SaRodorick Thompson	22 carries, 86 yards, 2 TDs
Texas Tech	Receiving	Jerand Bradley	8 receptions, 173 yards, 1 TD

=== Vs. No.13 Florida State (2022 Cheez-It Bowl) ===
Uniform Combination
Helmet	Jersey	Pants

Oklahoma Sooners (6–6) v. No.13 Florida State Seminoles (9–3)

Quarter	1	2	3	4	Total
Oklahoma	7	10	0	15	32
No.13 Florida State	3	8	7	17	35

at Camping World Stadium • Orlando, FL

- Date: Thursday, December 29, 2022
- Game time: 4:30 p.m. CST
- Game weather: • Sunny Temperature: 73
- Game attendance: 61,520
- Referee: James Carter
- TV announcers (ESPN): Bob Wischusen (play-by-play), Dan Orlovsky (analyst) & Kris Budden (sideline)

Game information

First Quarter

- (10:20) FSU – Ryan Fitzgerald 22 yard FG (Drive: 9 plays, 70 yards, 4:40; FSU 3–0)
- (7:01) OKLA – Dillon Gabriel 22 yard pass to Jalil Farooq, Zach Schmit kick (Drive: 13 plays, 75 yards, 4:25; OU 7–3)

Second Quarter

- (14:31) OKLA – Dillon Gabriel 8 yard rush, Zach Schmit kick (Drive: 8 plays, 49 yards, 2:55; OU 14–3)
- (7:18) FSU – Jordan Travis 16 yard pass to Ontaria Wilson, Wyatt Rector pass to Brian Courtney for 2 point conversion (Drive: 6 plays, 72 yards, 2:29; OU 14–11)
- (0:15) OKLA – Zach Schmit 51 yard FG (Drive: 7 plays, 65 yards, 1:36; OU 17–11)

Third Quarter

- (5:33) FSU – Treshaun Ward 1 yard rush, Ryan Fitzgerald kick (Drive: 15 plays, 94 yards, 4:56; FSU 18–17)

Fourth Quarter

- (13:22) OKLA – Gavin Sawchuk 15 yard rush, Dillon Gabriel pass to Brayden Willis for 2 point conversion (Drive: 7 plays, 70 yards, 2:05; OU 25–18)
- (11:05) FSU – Treshuan Ward 38 yards rush, Ryan Fitzgerald kick (Drive: 6 plays, 74 yards, 2:17; Tied 25–25)
- (7:22) FSU – Jordan Travis 17 yard pass to Markeston Douglas, Ryan Fitzgerald kick (Drive: 6 plays, 68 yards, 2:19; FSU 32–25)
- (3:37) OKLA – Jovantae Barnes 11 yard rush, Zach Schmit kick (Drive: 9 plays, 75 yards, 3:45; Tied 32–32)
- (0:55) FSU – Ryan Fitzgerald 32 yard FG (Drive: 6 plays, 61 yards, 2:42; FSU 35–32)

Statistics	OKLA	FSU
First downs	27	26
Total yards	496	587
Rushes/yards	60/253	34/169
Passing yards	243	418
Passing: Comp–Att–Int	14-24-	27–38–1
Time of possession	30:10	29:16

Team	Category	Player	Statistics
Oklahoma	Passing	Dillon Gabriel	14/24, 243 yards, 1 TD
Oklahoma	Rushing	Jovantae Barnes	27 carries, 108 yards, 1 TD
Oklahoma	Receiving	Marvin Mims	2 receptions, 77 yards
Florida State	Passing	Jordan Travis	27/38, 418 yards, 2 TD's 1 INT
Florida State	Rushing	Treshaun Ward	10 carries, 81 yards, 2 TD's
Florida State	Receiving	Johnny Wilson	8 receptions, 202 yards

== Statistics ==
=== Team ===
	Oklahoma	Opp
Scoring		
Points per game		
First downs		
Rushing		
Passing		
Penalty		
Rushing yards		
Avg per play		
Avg per game		
Rushing touchdowns		
Passing yards		
Att-Comp-Int		
Avg per pass		
Avg per catch		
Avg per game		
Passing touchdowns		
Total offense		
Avg per play		
Avg per game		
Fumbles-Lost		
Penalties-Yards		
Avg per game		

	Oklahoma	Opp
Punts-Yards		
Avg per punt		
Time of possession/Game		
3rd down conversions		
4th down conversions		
Touchdowns scored		
Field goals-Attempts		
PAT-Attempts		
Attendance		
Games/Avg per Game		
Neutral Site		

=== Individual Leaders ===
Passing statistics
#	NAME	POS	RAT	CMP	ATT	YDS	AVG/G	CMP%	TD	INT	LONG
–	–	–	–	–	–	–	–	–	–	–	–
	TOTALS		-	-	-	-	-	-%	-	-	-

Rushing statistics
#	NAME	POS	ATT	GAIN	AVG	TD	LONG	AVG/G
–	–	–	–	–	–	–	–	–
	TOTALS		-	-	-	-	-	-

Receiving statistics
#	NAME	POS	CTH	YDS	AVG	TD	LONG	AVG/G
–	–	–	–	–	–	–	–	–
	TOTALS		-	-	-	-	-	-

==== Defense ====
Defense statistics
#	NAME	POS	SOLO	AST	TOT	TFL-YDS	SACK-YDS	INT	BU	QBH	FR	FF	BLK	SAF	TD
–	–	–	–	–	–	–	–	–	–	–	–	–	–	–	–
	TOTAL		-	-	-	-	-	-	-	-	-	-	-	-	-

Key: POS: Position, SOLO: Solo Tackles, AST: Assisted Tackles, TOT: Total Tackles, TFL: Tackles-for-loss, SACK: Quarterback Sacks, INT: Interceptions, BU: Passes Broken Up, PD: Passes Defended, QBH: Quarterback Hits, FR: Fumbles Recovered, FF: Forced Fumbles, BLK: Kicks or Punts Blocked, SAF: Safeties, TD : Touchdown

==== Special teams ====
Kicking statistics
#	NAME	POS	XPM	XPA	XP%	FGM	FGA	FG%	1–19	20–29	30–39	40–49	50+	LNG
–	–	–	–	–	-%	–	–	-%	-/-	-/-	-/-	-/-	-/-	–
	TOTALS		-	-	-%	-	-	-%	-/-	-/-	-/-	-/-	-/-	-

Kickoff statistics
#	NAME	POS	KICKS	YDS	AVG	TB	OB
–	–	–	–	–	–	–	–
	TOTALS		-	-	-	-	-

Punting statistics
#	NAME	POS	PUNTS	YDS	AVG	LONG	TB	I–20	50+	BLK
–	–	–	–	–	–	–	–	–	–	–
	TOTALS		-	-	-	-	-	-	-	-

Kick return statistics
#	NAME	POS	RTNS	YDS	AVG	TD	LNG
–	–	–	–	–	–	–	–
	TOTALS		-	-	-	-	-

Punt return statistics
#	NAME	POS	RTNS	YDS	AVG	TD	LONG
–	–	–	–	–	–	–	–
	TOTALS		-	-	-	-	-

=== Scoring ===
Oklahoma vs Non-Conference Opponents

	1	2	3	4	Total
Oklahoma	35	35	52	5	127
Opponents	7	13	0	10	30

Oklahoma vs Big 12 Opponents

	1	2	3	4	Total
Oklahoma	34	48	24	42	148
Opponents	65	55	38	42	200

Oklahoma vs All Opponents

	1	2	3	4	Total
Oklahoma	69	83	76	36	264
Opponents	72	68	38	52	230

== Rankings ==
Ranking movements Legend: ██ Increase in ranking ██ Decrease in ranking — = Not ranked RV = Received votes
	Week															
Poll	Pre	1	2	3	4	5	6	7	8	9	10	11	12	13	14	Final
AP	9	7	6	6	18	RV	—	—	—	—	—	—	—	—	—	—
Coaches	9	7	6	6	16	RV	—	—	—	—	—	—	—	—	—	—
CFP	Not released									—	—	—	—	—	—	Not released

=== NFL draft ===
The NFL draft was held at Arrowhead Stadium in Kansas City, MO on April 27–29, 2023.

Sooners who were picked in the 2023 NFL Draft:

Round	Pick	Player	Position	NFL team
1	27	Anton Harrison	OT	Jacksonville Jaguars
2	63	Marvin Mims	WR	Denver Broncos
3	92	Wanya Morris	OT	Kansas City Chiefs
5	172	Eric Gray	RB	New York Giants
7	247	Brayden Willis	TE	San Francisco 49ers
