= 2022 Cheez-It Bowl =

American college football game

- 33rd Cheez-It Bowl
| Oklahoma Sooners | Florida State Seminoles |
| (6–6) | (9–3) |
| Big 12 | ACC |
| 32 | 35 |
| Head coach: Brent Venables | Head coach: Mike Norvell |
| | AP / Coaches / CFP; 13 / 13 / 13 |
| | 1 | 2 | 3 | 4 | Total |
|---|---|---|---|---|---|
| Oklahoma | 7 | 10 | 0 | 15 | 32 |
| Florida State | 3 | 8 | 7 | 17 | 35 |
- Date: December 29, 2022
- Season: 2022
- Stadium: Camping World Stadium
- Location: Orlando, Florida
- MVP: Jordan Travis (QB, Florida State)
- Favorite: Florida State by 10
- Referee: James Carter (SEC)
- Attendance: 61,520
- Payout: US$6,071,760

United States TV coverage
- Network: ESPN
- Announcers: Bob Wischusen (play-by-play), Dan Orlovsky (analyst), and Kris Budden (sideline)

International TV coverage
- Network: ESPN Deportes

The 2022 Cheez-It Bowl was a college football bowl game played on December 29, 2022, at Camping World Stadium in Orlando, Florida. The 33rd annual Cheez-It Bowl, the game featured Florida State from the Atlantic Coast Conference and Oklahoma from the Big 12 Conference. The game began at 5:35 p.m. EST and was aired on ESPN. It was one of the 2022–23 bowl games concluding the 2022 FBS football season. The game's title sponsor was Kellogg's through their Cheez-It brand.

== Teams ==
Consistent with conference tie-ins, the game featured teams from the Atlantic Coast Conference (ACC) and the Big 12 Conference. This was the eighth meeting between Oklahoma and Florida State; the Sooners led the all-time series, 6–1. It was the teams' fifth bowl game against each other, preceded by the 1965 Gator Bowl, 1980 Orange Bowl, 1981 Orange Bowl and the 2001 Orange Bowl (the latter of which saw the 2000 Sooners win the national championship).

=== Florida State ===
Florida State started the season hoping to at least make a bowl game after having gone 5–7 (4–4 ACC) in 2021. They had an easy win over Duquesne to start the season. The next week, they faced LSU in the first-ever edition of the Louisiana Kickoff, held at Caesars Superdome in New Orleans. The Seminoles won, 24–23, after they successfully blocked an extra point attempt from LSU that would have sent the game into overtime. They took a bye week before defeating their next two opponents, Louisville and Boston College, the latter in front of a sellout crowd. Florida State started the season with four conservative wins and entered the rankings at No. 23 before suffering three consecutive losses to ACC Atlantic foes No. 22 Wake Forest, No. 14 NC State, and No. 4 Clemson. However, they rebounded by handily defeating Georgia Tech, in-state rival Miami, Syracuse, and Louisiana, and defeated their other in-state rival, Florida, for the first time since 2017. The Seminoles recorded a second-place finish in the ACC Atlantic, as two of the teams they lost to—NC State and Wake Forest—both suffered conference losses of their own (and more Conference losses than Florida State) after beating Florida State; this allowed Florida State to place ahead of them in the division standings and get a better bowl bid. The Seminoles entered the bowl with a record of 9–3 (5–3 ACC) and ranked No. 13 in each of the major polls.

=== Oklahoma ===
Oklahoma completed their regular season with an overall 6–6 record, 3–6 in Big 12 games. After starting the season with three non-conference wins, The Sooners had three consecutive conference losses before winning their first conference game by beating Kansas. Oklahoma went on to finish the season with wins against Iowa State and Oklahoma State and losses to Baylor, West Virginia, and Texas Tech.

== Game summary ==
2022 Cheez-It Bowl

| Quarter | 1 | 2 | 3 | 4 | Total |
|---|---|---|---|---|---|
| Oklahoma | 7 | 10 | 0 | 15 | 32 |
| No.13 Florida State | 3 | 8 | 7 | 17 | 35 |

at Camping World Stadium • Orlando, Florida

- Date: Thursday, December 29, 2022
- Game time: 5:30 p.m. EST
- Game weather: Sunny • Temperature: 73 °F (23 °C) • Wind: 8 mph (13 km/h) east
- Game attendance: 61,520
- Referee: James Carter
- TV announcers (ESPN): Bob Wischusen (play-by-play), Dan Orlovsky (analyst), and Kris Budden (sideline)
- Box score

Scoring summary

| Quarter | Time | Drive | | | Team | Scoring information | Score | |
| Quarter | Time | Plays | Yards | TOP | Team | Scoring information | Oklahoma | Florida State |
|---|---|---|---|---|---|---|---|---|
| 1 | 11:26 | 9 | 70 | 3:34 | Florida State | 22-yard field goal by Ryan Fitzgerald | 0 | 3 |
| 1 | 7:01 | 13 | 75 | 4:25 | Oklahoma | Jalil Farooq 22-yard touchdown reception from Dillon Gabriel, Zach Schmit kick good | 7 | 3 |
| 2 | 14:31 | 8 | 49 | 2:55 | Oklahoma | Dillon Gabriel 8-yard touchdown run, Zach Schmit kick good | 14 | 3 |
| 2 | 7:18 | 6 | 72 | 2:29 | Florida State | Ontaria Wilson 16-yard touchdown reception from Jordan Travis, 2-point pass good (W. Rector to B. Courtney) | 14 | 11 |
| 2 | 0:19 | 7 | 65 | 1:30 | Oklahoma | 41-yard field goal by Zach Schmit | 17 | 11 |
| 3 | 5:33 | 15 | 94 | 4:56 | Florida State | Treshaun Ward 1-yard touchdown run, Ryan Fitzgerald kick good | 17 | 18 |
| 4 | 13:22 | 7 | 70 | 2:05 | Oklahoma | Gavin Sawchuk 15-yard touchdown run, 2-point pass good (D. Gabriel to B. Willis) | 25 | 18 |
| 4 | 11:05 | 6 | 75 | 2:17 | Florida State | Treshaun Ward 38-yard touchdown run, Ryan Fitzgerald kick good | 25 | 25 |
| 4 | 7:22 | 6 | 68 | 2:38 | Florida State | Markeston Douglas 17-yard touchdown reception from Jordan Travis, Ryan Fitzgerald kick good | 25 | 32 |
| 4 | 3:37 | 9 | 75 | 3:45 | Oklahoma | Jovantae Barnes 12-yard touchdown run, Zach Schmit kick good | 32 | 32 |
| 4 | 0:55 | 6 | 61 | 2:42 | Florida State | 32-yard field goal by Ryan Fitzgerald | 32 | 35 |
| "TOP" = time of possession. For other American football terms, see Glossary of American football. | | | | | | | 32 | 35 |

== Statistics ==
Team statistical comparison
| Statistic | Oklahoma | Florida State |
|---|---|---|
| First downs | 27 | 26 |
| First downs rushing | 17 | 7 |
| First downs passing | 9 | 19 |
| First downs penalty | 1 | 0 |
| Third down efficiency | 8–17 | 5–12 |
| Fourth down efficiency | 1–2 | 0–3 |
| Total plays–net yards | 84–496 | 72–587 |
| Rushing attempts–net yards | 60–253 | 34–169 |
| Yards per rush | 4.2 | 5.0 |
| Yards passing | 243 | 418 |
| Pass completions–attempts | 14–24 | 27–38 |
| Interceptions thrown | 0 | 1 |
| Punt returns–total yards | 1–23 | 0–0 |
| Kickoff returns–total yards | 0–0 | 2–29 |
| Punts–average yardage | 3–48.0 | 2–44.0 |
| Fumbles–lost | 2–1 | 0–0 |
| Penalties–yards | 7–46 | 3–25 |
| Time of possession | 31:11 | 28:49 |

Oklahoma statistics
Sooners passing
| | C–A | Yds | TD–INT |
|---|---|---|---|
| Dillon Gabriel | 14–24 | 243 | 1–0 |
Sooners rushing
| | Car | Yds | TD |
| Jovantae Barnes | 27 | 108 | 1 |
| Gavin Sawchuk | 15 | 100 | 1 |
| Dillon Gabriel | 14 | 17 | 1 |
| Jalil Farooq | 2 | 14 | 0 |
| Gavin Freeman | 1 | 9 | 0 |
| Nic Anderson | 1 | 5 | 0 |
Sooners receiving
| | Rec | Yds | TD |
| Marvin Mims Jr. | 2 | 77 | 0 |
| Jalil Farooq | 4 | 59 | 1 |
| Brayden Willis | 4 | 58 | 0 |
| Drake Stoops | 2 | 27 | 0 |
| LV Bunkley-Shelton | 1 | 14 | 0 |
| Gavin Sawchuk | 1 | 8 | 0 |

Florida State statistics
Seminoles passing
| | C–A | Yds | TD–INT |
|---|---|---|---|
| Jordan Travis | 27–38 | 418 | 2–1 |
Seminoles rushing
| | Car | Yds | TD |
| Treshaun Ward | 10 | 81 | 2 |
| Jordan Travis | 7 | 50 | 0 |
| Trey Benson | 13 | 25 | 0 |
| Lawrance Toafili | 1 | 10 | 0 |
| Mycah Pittman | 1 | 2 | 0 |
| Darion Williamson | 1 | 1 | 0 |
| DJ Lundy | 1 | 0 | 0 |
Seminoles receiving
| | Rec | Yds | TD |
| Johnny Wilson | 8 | 202 | 0 |
| Ontaria Wilson | 5 | 74 | 1 |
| Markeston Douglas | 4 | 50 | 1 |
| Trey Benson | 1 | 33 | 0 |
| Darion Williamson | 2 | 23 | 0 |
| Malik McClain | 2 | 14 | 0 |
| Mycah Pittman | 3 | 13 | 0 |
| Ja'Khi Douglas | 1 | 7 | 0 |
| Lawrance Toafili | 1 | 2 | 0 |

== See also ==
- 2023 Citrus Bowl, contested at the same venue on January 2, and also sponsored by Cheez-It
