= Tyler Guyton =

American football player (born 2002)

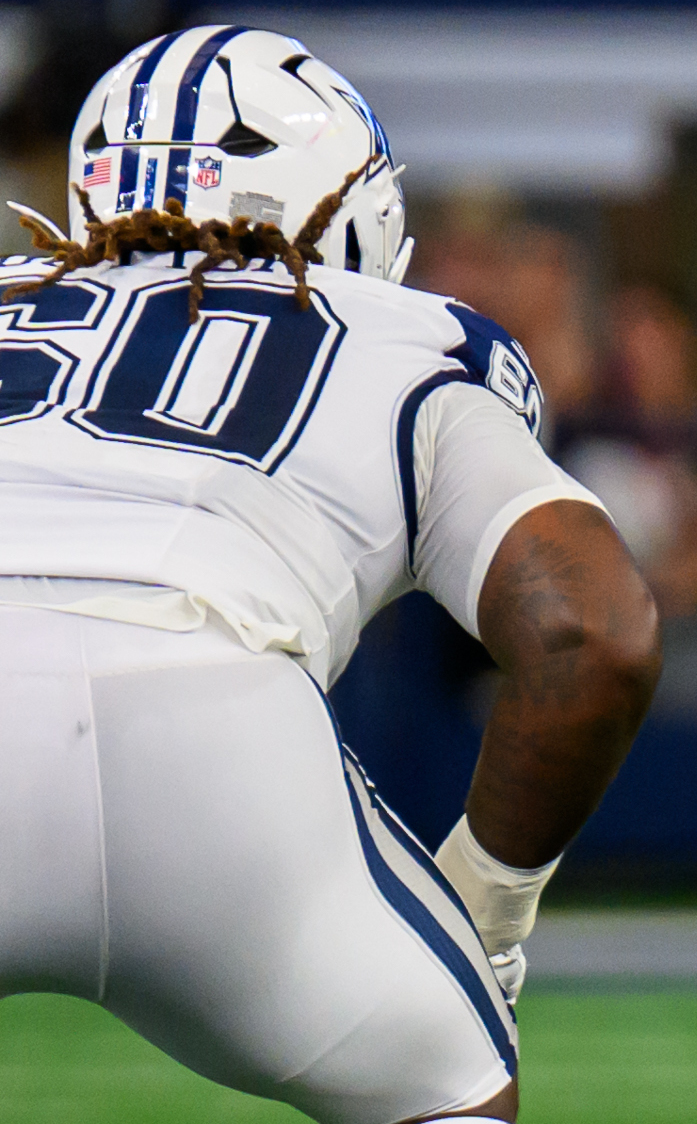
- Guyton in 2025

No. 60 – Dallas Cowboys
- Position: Offensive tackle
- Roster status: Active

Personal information
- Born: June 11, 2001 (age 25); Austin, Texas, U.S.
- Listed height: 6 ft 7 in (2.01 m)
- Listed weight: 325 lb (147 kg)

Career information
- High school: Manor (Manor, Texas)
- College: TCU (2020–2021); Oklahoma (2022–2023)
- NFL draft: 2024: 1st round, 29th overall pick

Career history
- Dallas Cowboys (2024–present)

Career NFL statistics as of Week 3, 2026
- Games played: 28
- Games started: 24
- Stats at Pro Football Reference

Tyler Guyton (born June 11, 2001) is an American professional football offensive tackle for the Dallas Cowboys of the National Football League (NFL). He played college football for the TCU Horned Frogs and Oklahoma Sooners. Guyton was drafted by the Cowboys in the first round of the 2024 NFL draft.

== Early life ==
Guyton was born on June 11, 2001, in Manor, Texas. He attended Manor High School and played football and basketball. He played mainly as a defensive lineman for Manor and helped them reach the state quarterfinal while being a second-team All-District 11-5A selection. Ranked by 247Sports as a three-star recruit and the 145th-best player from Texas, Guyton ultimately committed to play college football for the TCU Horned Frogs.

== College career ==
As a true freshman at Texas Christian University in 2020, Guyton redshirted, seeing action in only one game.

As a redshirt freshman in 2021, he appeared in eight games, one as a starter, while splitting time between being a backup offensive lineman and H-back. He caught a touchdown pass in a game against Iowa State.

In January 2022, Guyton transferred to the University of Oklahoma to play for the Oklahoma Sooners. In his first season for the Sooners, Guyton began the season as a left tackle, switching to right tackle by the end of it. He appeared in 10 games with 5 starts, taking part in 400 snaps, while allowing only two sacks and no quarterback hits.

As a junior in 2023, with Wanya Morris and Anton Harrison leaving for the National Football League Draft, Guyton was named the starter at right tackle, protecting the blind side of left-handed quarterback Dillon Gabriel. He appeared in 10 games with 9 starts, playing a career-high 663 snaps and allowed no sacks. He declared for the 2024 NFL draft following the season, where he was viewed as a potential first-round selection.

== Professional career ==
Pre-draft measurables
Height	Weight	Arm length	Hand span	Wingspan	40-yard dash	10-yard split	20-yard split	20-yard shuttle	Three-cone drill	Vertical jump	Broad jump
6 ft 7 3/4 in (2.03 m)	322 lb (146 kg)	34 1/8 in (0.87 m)	10 1/4 in (0.26 m)	6 ft 10 1/4 in (2.09 m)	5.19 s	1.76 s	2.97 s	4.71 s	7.50 s	34.5 in (0.88 m)	8 ft 11 in (2.72 m)
All values from NFL Combine

Guyton was selected by the Dallas Cowboys in the first round with the 29th overall pick in the 2024 NFL draft. He was drafted to be the heir apparent to All-Pro Tyron Smith who left in free agency. His progress in training camp was slowed making the transition from his college right tackle experience. He began as the backup at left tackle behind Chuma Edoga. He took over the starting position after Edoga suffered a fractured toe in the first preseason game against the Los Angeles Rams. He wasn't able to practice on different weeks during the season because of injuries, which affected his development. He lost his starting position from Week 14 to 17, after Edoga returned from his injury. He started in the season finale against the Washington Commanders. He started in 11 out of the 15 contests he played and allowed 7 sacks. He missed two games with knee and shoulder injuries. He was called for 18 penalties and ranked third-most in the NFL in accepted penalties with 14.

Guyton started all 10 of his appearances for Dallas during the 2025 campaign. On December 24, 2025, Guyton was placed on season-ending injured reserve due to an ankle injury.
