= Jerry Schmidt =

American football coach

Current position
- Title: Strength and conditioning coach
- Team: Oklahoma
- Conference: SEC

Biographical details
- Born: September 16, 1962 (age 63)

Coaching career (HC unless noted)
- 1987: Notre Dame (assistant)
- 1988: Oklahoma State (S&SC)
- 1989–1994: Notre Dame (S&SC)
- 1995–1998: Florida (S&SC)
- 1999–2017: Oklahoma (DSE)
- 2018–2021: Texas A&M (DAE)
- 2022–present: Oklahoma (DSE/S&S)

Jerry Schmidt (born September 19, 1962) is the strength and conditioning coach for the University of Oklahoma Sooners' football team. He was previously the strength and conditioning coach for the Texas A&M University Aggies' football team. The Sooners' football Head coach Brent Venables announced the addition of Jerry Schmidt to his staff in a press release on December 17, 2021.

== Family ==
Jerry is married to Robin Schmidt and has two children; Samuel and Aubrey Schmidt. He has one brother, Gary Schmidt. His Father is Jerry Schmidt and his Mother is Tony Schmidt.

== High School and College ==
Schmidt was a 1980 graduate of Harvard High School in Harvard, Nebraska. He then attended the University of Nebraska–Lincoln, and graduated from the University of Oklahoma.

== Coaching career ==
Schmidt has coached at Notre Dame, Oklahoma State, Florida, and Oklahoma as an assistant, director, coordinator, and director of sports enhancement. In his career with those teams, he has coached in five national title games. He owns championship rings from Oklahoma, Notre Dame, and Florida. Schmidt was the 1991 Strength Coach of the Year by USAFitness. Schmidt has trained seven Heisman Trophy winners – Kyler Murray, Baker Mayfield, Sam Bradford and Jason White at Oklahoma, Danny Wuerffel at Florida, Barry Sanders at Oklahoma State and Tim Brown at Notre Dame – and has worked with 30 NFL first-round selections, 66 first-team All-Americans and dozens of major award winners. He has also trained teams that played in six national championship games and has been a part of national championship squads at Oklahoma (2000), Florida (1996) and Notre Dame (1988).

He is known for his discipline, intense workouts, and his advanced and innovative knowledge of his profession. His slogan, which is painted across a wall in Oklahoma's weight room, is "Hard Work Beats Talent When Talent Doesn't Work Hard!"

Brent Venables on Jerry Schmidt "That's a critical hire on so many levels. Jerry's values, expectations and standards align with mine and ours as a program. He's a detail guy, is super consistent and tough, but he's reasonable. He's the same guy whether you're winning by 40 or down by 14. I think it's important from a leadership standpoint that we have someone who has clear vision about what all of that looks like. So while his experience is tremendous, he's also an effective communicator and excellent motivator. He's going to bring out the absolute best in our guys. He'll stretch them and squeeze them in ways maybe they haven't been before, but it's going to benefit them and create the transferable skills both on the field and off. He's going to set them up for success for the rest of their lives."
