= Robert Spears-Jennings =

American football player (born 2004)

- Spears-Jennings with the Pittsburgh Steelers in 2026

No. 28 – Pittsburgh Steelers
- Position: Safety
- Roster status: Active

Personal information
- Born: January 25, 2004 (age 22); South Carolina, U.S.
- Listed height: 6 ft 2 in (1.88 m)
- Listed weight: 205 lb (93 kg)

Career information
- High school: Lake Ridge (Mansfield, Texas); Broken Arrow (Broken Arrow, Oklahoma)
- College: Oklahoma (2022–2025)
- NFL draft: 2026: 7th round, 224th overall pick

Career history
- Pittsburgh Steelers (2026–present)

Career NFL statistics as of Week 10, 2026
- Total tackles: 36
- Pass deflections: 2
- Interceptions: 1
- Stats at Pro Football Reference

Robert Spears-Jennings (born January 25, 2004) is an American professional football safety for the Pittsburgh Steelers of the National Football League (NFL). He played college football for the Oklahoma Sooners and was selected by the Steelers in the seventh round of the 2026 NFL draft.

== Early life ==
Spears-Jennings was born on January 25, 2004 in South Carolina. He lived in eight states during his childhood: South Carolina, Maryland, Florida, Virginia, Arkansas, Georgia, Texas and Oklahoma. He attended Lake Ridge High School in Mansfield, Texas and transferred to Broken Arrow High School in Broken Arrow, Oklahoma. He played both safety and wide receiver in high school. As a senior, he was the Oklahoma All-District 6A-I Safety of the Year after recording 56 tackles and four interceptions. He also had 36 receptions for 626 yards and eight touchdowns. Spears-Jennings committed to the University of Oklahoma to play college football.

== College career ==
Spears-Jennings played in nine games as a true freshman at Oklahoma in 2022 and had 14 tackles. As a sophomore in 2023, he started two of 12 games and recorded 38 tackles. He returned to Oklahoma as a starter his junior year in 2024.

== Professional career ==
Pre-draft measurables
Height	Weight	Arm length	Hand span	Wingspan	40-yard dash	10-yard split	20-yard split	20-yard shuttle	Three-cone drill	Vertical jump	Broad jump	Bench press
6 ft 1 7/8 in (1.88 m)	205 lb (93 kg)	32 1/2 in (0.83 m)	10 3/8 in (0.26 m)	6 ft 7 1/4 in (2.01 m)	4.32 s	1.51 s	2.52 s	4.38 s	7.14 s	38.0 in (0.97 m)	10 ft 5 in (3.18 m)	14 reps
All values from NFL Combine/Pro Day

Spears-Jennings was selected by the Pittsburgh Steelers in the seventh round with the 224th overall pick of the 2026 NFL draft. In Week 4, on October 1, 2026, Spears-Jennings recorded his first NFL interception, off Cleveland Browns quarterback Deshaun Watson.

== Career statistics ==
=== NFL ===
Year	Team	Games		Tackles						Interceptions				Fumbles			
Year	Team	GP	GS	Cmb	Solo	Ast	Sck	TFL	QBH	Int	Yds	TD	PD	FF	FR	Yds	TD
2026	PIT	9	2	36	18	18	0.0	0	0	1	0	0	2	0	0	0	0
Career		9	2	36	18	18	0.0	0	0	1	0	0	2	0	0	0	0

=== College ===
Year	Team	GP	Tackles				Interceptions				Fumbles		
Year	Team	GP	Total	Solo	Ast	Sack	PD	Int	Yds	TD	FF	FR	TD
2022	Oklahoma	9	15	6	9	0.0	0	0	0	0	0	0	0
2023	Oklahoma	12	38	20	18	0.0	1	0	0	0	0	0	0
2024	Oklahoma	13	66	43	23	2.5	1	1	0	0	4	2	0
2025	Oklahoma	13	59	33	26	0.0	2	1	37	0	1	0	0
Career		47	178	102	76	2.5	4	2	37	0	5	2	0
