= Drake Stoops =

American football player (born 1999)

No. 13 – Colorado Stampede
- Position: Wide receiver
- Roster status: Active

Personal information
- Born: June 16, 1999 (age 27); Norman, Oklahoma, U.S.
- Listed height: 5 ft 10 in (1.78 m)
- Listed weight: 189 lb (86 kg)

Career information
- High school: Norman North (Norman, Oklahoma)
- College: Oklahoma (2018–2023)
- NFL draft: 2024: undrafted

Career history
- Los Angeles Rams (2024)*; Dallas Renegades (2026); Colorado Stampede (2027–present)
- * Offseason or practice squad member only

Awards and highlights
- First-team All-Big 12 (2023)
- Stats at Pro Football Reference

Drake Stoops (born June 16, 1999) is an American professional football wide receiver for the Colorado Stampede of the United Football League (UFL). He played college football for the Oklahoma Sooners. He is the son of former Sooners head coach Bob Stoops and nephew of Mark and Mike Stoops.

== Early life ==
Stoops, along with his brother Isaac, played football at Norman North High School in Norman, Oklahoma. As a junior, he caught 86 passes for 1,536 yards and 20 touchdowns to help lead Norman North to the state championship game. In his senior year, he caught 67 passes for 1,093 yards and 15 touchdowns in 10 games. Stoops ended his high school career with 201 catches for 3,390 yards and 39 touchdowns, being named as a two-time first-team all-state selection by The Oklahoman.

Rated as a three-star recruit by major recruiting services 247Sports and Rivals, Stoops received scholarship offers from Air Force, Iowa, Memphis, Ohio, and Western Kentucky. However, he decided to join Oklahoma as a preferred walk-on.

== College career ==
Coming into Oklahoma, Stoops was joined by his brother Isaac, also a wide receiver. However, Isaac left the team before their freshman season. Head coach Lincoln Riley acknowledged that Stoops was not highly recruited due to his size and lack of track speed, but acknowledged that Stoops' name gave him some pause too.

Stoops entered his first year at Oklahoma, appearing in the first two games where he caught two passes for 16 yards against Florida Atlantic. He is believed to be the first true Sooner freshman walk-on to record a catch in a season opener. As a sophomore, Stoops played in all 14 games as a reserve receiver and punt returner where he totaled eight receptions for 95 yards. In his first bowl game, he caught two passes for a career-high 28 yards against LSU in the 2019 Peach Bowl. With the departure of CeeDee Lamb, Stoops played in 10 games and made seven starts, recording 15 receptions for 219 yards and two touchdowns. After missing the season opener, he caught three passes for 93 yards, which included a career-long 51-yard touchdown in a loss against Kansas State. In a four overtime win against Texas, he scored a game-winning touchdown on a 20-yard reception from Spencer Rattler.

After the Sooners spring game, Stoops was awarded a scholarship by head coach Lincoln Riley prior to the 2021 season. As a junior, he recorded 16 receptions for 191 yards and two touchdowns despite missing three games. Against Texas Tech, he had a career high-tying three receptions for 57 yards and a touchdown. After head coach Lincoln Riley departed for USC, Stoops' dad, former Oklahoma head coach Bob Stoops, was named interim head coach for the 2021 Alamo Bowl. In the Alamo Bowl, Stoops had one reception for a touchdown playing under his dad.

Under new head coach Brent Venables, Stoops played in all 13 games and made ten starts in the 2022 season. As a senior, he tied for second on the team with 39 receptions and totaled 393 yards and three touchdowns. Against Oklahoma State, he set a career high with six receptions for 89 yards and a touchdown. A week later against Texas Tech again, he topped last year's performance by tying a career high six receptions for 55 yards. Stoops enjoyed his best year averaging 10.1 yards per catch with his receptions, receiving yards, and touchdowns all marking career highs.

=== Statistics ===
Year	Team	Receiving					Rushing				
Year	Team	Rec	Yds	Avg	Lng	TD	Att	Yds	Avg	Lng	TD
2018	Oklahoma	2	16	8.0	8	0	0	0	0.0	0	0
2019	Oklahoma	8	95	11.9	19	0	0	0	0.0	0	0
2020	Oklahoma	15	219	14.6	51	2	0	0	0.0	0	0
2021	Oklahoma	16	191	11.9	31	2	0	0	0.0	0	0
2022	Oklahoma	39	393	10.1	33	3	8	48	6.0	14	0
2023	Oklahoma	84	962	11.5	60	10	4	8	2	13	0
Career		164	1876	11.4	51	17	12	56	6.0	27	0

== Professional career ==
Pre-draft measurables
Height	Weight	Arm length	Hand span	Wingspan	40-yard dash	10-yard split	20-yard split	20-yard shuttle	Three-cone drill	Vertical jump	Broad jump	Bench press
5 ft 9 5/8 in (1.77 m)	186 lb (84 kg)	29 in (0.74 m)	8 1/2 in (0.22 m)	5 ft 9 1/2 in (1.77 m)	4.67 s	1.63 s	2.65 s	4.25 s	7.01 s	30.0 in (0.76 m)	8 ft 11 in (2.72 m)	8 reps
All values from Pro Day

=== Los Angeles Rams ===
Stoops signed with the Los Angeles Rams as an undrafted free agent on May 2, 2024. He was also selected by the Arlington Renegades (the team coached by his father) in the 10th round of the 2024 UFL draft on July 17. He was waived on August 27, and re-signed to the practice squad. He signed a reserve/future contract on January 20, 2025.

On August 26, 2025, Stoops was waived by the Rams as part of final roster cuts.

=== Dallas Renegades ===
On January 20, 2026, Stoops signed with the Dallas Renegades of the United Football League (UFL).
