= Ryan Fitzgerald (American football) =

American football player (born 2000)

No. 10 – Carolina Panthers
- Position: Kicker
- Roster status: Active

Personal information
- Born: August 13, 2000 (age 26); Coolidge, Georgia, U.S.
- Listed height: 5 ft 11 in (1.80 m)
- Listed weight: 201 lb (91 kg)

Career information
- High school: Colquitt County (Colquitt County, Georgia)
- College: Florida State (2019–2024)
- NFL draft: 2025: undrafted

Career history
- Carolina Panthers (2025–present)

Awards and highlights
- First-team All-American (2024); Second team All-ACC (2024); Third team All-ACC (2023)

Career NFL statistics as of Week 8, 2026
- Field goals made: 37
- Field goals attempted: 42
- Field goal %: 88.1%
- Extra points made: 40
- Extra points attempted: 48
- Extra point %: 83.3%
- Points: 151
- Longest field goal: 57
- Touchbacks: 17
- Stats at Pro Football Reference

Ryan Fitzgerald (born August 13, 2000) is an American professional football kicker for the Carolina Panthers of the National Football League (NFL). He played college football for the Florida State Seminoles.

== Early life ==
Fitzgerald attended Colquitt County High School in Colquitt County, Georgia. He was rated as a three-star recruit and committed to play college football for the Florida State Seminoles.

== College career ==
Fitzgerald took a redshirt in 2019. In his first season as starter in 2020, he hit four of his seven field goals while also making all 12 extra point attempts. In week 5 of the 2021 season, Fitzgerald made the game-winning 34-yard field goal to help the Seminoles beat Syracuse. He finished the season making 10 of 13 field goal attempts and converting on 37 of 40 extra point attempts. In the 2022 Cheez-It Bowl, Fitzgerald made two of three field goals, including the game-winning 32-yard field goal, in a win over Oklahoma. During the 2022 season, he hit 12 of 20 field goal attempts and made 57 of 58 extra points. In 2023, Fitzgerald made 19 of 21 field goals and converted on all 58 of his extra point attempts. In week zero of the 2024 season, he was named the Atlantic Coast Conference (ACC) special teams player of the week after converting on his one extra point attempt and two fifty yard field goals, including a career-long 59-yard field goal versus Georgia Tech. Fitzgerald accepted an invite to play in the 2025 Senior Bowl.

== Professional career ==
Pre-draft measurables
Height	Weight	Arm length	Hand span	Wingspan
5 ft 11 in (1.80 m)	193 lb (88 kg)	30 in (0.76 m)	8 1/8 in (0.21 m)	6 ft 0 1/2 in (1.84 m)
All values from NFL Combine

On May 8, 2025, Fitzgerald signed with the Carolina Panthers as an undrafted free agent after going unselected in the 2025 NFL draft. Fitzgerald won the starting job on August 25, after Matthew Wright was released.

Through his first three games of the 2025 season, Fitzgerald was 5-for-5 on field goals and 5-for-5 on extra points. His longest kick of 57 yards was achieved against the Falcons in Week 3. In Week 6, Fitzgerald was 3-for-3 on extra points and 3-for-3 on field goals, including a 33-yard walk-off in a 30-27 win over the Dallas Cowboys, earning NFC Special Teams Player of the Week.
