= Todd Bates (American football) =

American football player and coach (born 1983)

- Bates with Clemson in 2021.

Current position
- Title: Co-defensive coordinator & defensive tackles coach
- Team: Oklahoma
- Conference: SEC
- Annual salary: $700,000

Biographical details
- Born: March 12, 1983 (age 43); Heflin, Alabama, U.S.

Playing career
- 2001–2004: Alabama
- 2005–2006: Tennessee Titans
- Position: Defensive end

Coaching career (HC unless noted)
- 2007: Talladega HS (assistant)
- 2008–2011: Oxford HS (AL) (assistant)
- 2011–2012: Idaho State (DL)
- 2013: East Central CC (DL)
- 2014–2016: Jacksonville State (DL)
- 2017: Clemson (DL)
- 2018–2019: Clemson (DT)
- 2020–2021: Clemson (DT/RC)
- 2022–present: Oklahoma (AHC/co-DC/DT)

Todd Bates (born March 12, 1983) is an American football coach and former defensive end who is currently the co-defensive coordinator and defensive tackles coach at the University of Oklahoma. He previously served as the defensive tackles coach and recruiting coordinator at Clemson University from 2018 to 2021

Bates has established himself as one of top college football recruiters in the country, winning the Rivals Recruiter of the Year award in 2019.

== Playing career ==
Bates was a four-year defensive end at Alabama from 2001 to 2004, and was a co-captain in his senior year, winning SEC defensive lineman of the week for his performance in the Crimson Tide's game against Southern Miss. He signed with the Tennessee Titans as an undrafted free agent in 2005 and spent two seasons with the team before retiring due to a number of injuries.

== Coaching career ==
=== Early career ===
Bates began his coaching career at Talladega High School in Alabama as an assistant before moving on to Oxford High School as an assistant coach under John Grass. After two seasons at Idaho State and another at East Central Community College as a defensive line coach, Bates re-joined Grass at Jacksonville State as his defensive line coach.

=== Clemson ===
Following the retirement of Dan Brooks and the departure of Marion Hobby, Bates was named the defensive line coach at Clemson in 2017 on the recommendation of Brooks, who he had met while coaching at the Dabo Swinney coaching camps. He was shown to have made an immediate impact, earning praise from other Clemson assistants, including defensive coordinator Brent Venables, taking an already-loaded defensive line led by Christian Wilkins and Dexter Lawrence to new heights as Wilkins, Lawrence, Clelin Ferrell, and Austin Bryant all earned either All-American or first-team ACC honors in Bates' first two seasons.

Bates added recruiting coordinator duties after previous coordinator Brandon Streeter was promoted to passing game coordinator in 2020.

On December 14, 2021, Bates was promoted to assistant head coach, defensive tackles coach and recruiting coordinator following the departure of Tony Elliott and Brent Venables.

=== Oklahoma ===
On January 4, 2022, Bates was hired as the co-defensive coordinator and defensive tackles at the University of Oklahoma reuniting with head coach Brent Venables, whom Bates worked with at Clemson.

== Personal life ==
Bates and his wife La'Tesa have four children; Angel, Josiah and twin daughters Star and Summer. While at Alabama, Bates began writing poetry and has had his poems showcased on t-shirts as well as murals. He also has a website in which he posts poems of the month as well as other poems he has written.
