= Kani Walker =

American football player (born 2003)

No. 41 – Buffalo Bills
- Position: Cornerback
- Roster status: Practice squad

Personal information
- Born: February 28, 2003 (age 23); Atlanta, Georgia, U.S.
- Listed height: 6 ft 2 in (1.88 m)
- Listed weight: 203 lb (92 kg)

Career information
- High school: Douglas County (Douglasville, Georgia)
- College: Louisville (2021); Oklahoma (2022–2024); Arkansas (2025)
- NFL draft: 2026: undrafted

Career history
- Buffalo Bills (2026–present)

Career NFL statistics as of Week 4, 2026
- Total tackles: 1
- Stats at Pro Football Reference

Kani Walker (born February 28, 2003) is an American professional football cornerback for the Buffalo Bills of the National Football League (NFL). He played college football for the Arkansas Razorbacks, Louisville Cardinals, and Oklahoma Sooners.

== Early life ==
Walker attended Douglas County High School in Douglasville, Georgia, and committed to play college football for the Louisville Cardinals.

== College career ==
=== Louisville ===
As a freshman in 2021, Walker played in just one game. After the season, he entered the NCAA transfer portal.

=== Oklahoma ===
Walker transferred to play for the Oklahoma Sooners. In 2022, he made three tackles in six games played. In the 2023 season opener, Walker put up three tackles, a forced fumble, and a fumble recovery in a blowout win over Central Arkansas. He played ten games on the season with one start, finishing with 24 tackles, an interception, and a forced fumble. In 2024, Walker played in 11 games with nine starts, totaling 24 tackles, six pass deflections, and an interception. After the season, he once again entered the NCAA transfer portal.

=== Arkansas ===
Walker transferred to play for the Arkansas Razorbacks. In week 3 of the 2025 season, he was carted off with a head injury versus Ole Miss. Walker finished the 2025 season with 52 tackles with three going for a loss, a sack, 11 pass deflections, and an interception in 11 starts.

== Professional career ==
Pre-draft measurables
Height	Weight	Arm length	Hand span	Wingspan	40-yard dash	10-yard split	20-yard split	20-yard shuttle	Three-cone drill	Vertical jump	Broad jump	Bench press
6 ft 2 in (1.88 m)	203 lb (92 kg)	31 1/2 in (0.80 m)	9 3/4 in (0.25 m)	6 ft 4 in (1.93 m)	4.58 s	1.56 s	2.72 s	4.40 s	7.32 s	33.5 in (0.85 m)	10 ft 1 in (3.07 m)	12 reps
All values from Pro Day

After not being selected in the 2026 NFL draft, Walker signed with the Buffalo Bills as an undrafted free agent on May 8, 2026. On August 30, Walker was waived by the Bills as a part of final roster cuts; he was re-signed to the team's practice squad the next day.
