= Gavin Sawchuk =

American football player (born 2003)

No. 27 – Northwestern Wildcats
- Position: Running back
- Class: Redshirt Senior

Personal information
- Born: July 28, 2003 (age 23); Louisiana, U.S.
- Listed height: 6 ft 0 in (1.83 m)
- Listed weight: 205 lb (93 kg)

Career information
- High school: Valor Christian (Highlands Ranch, Colorado)
- College: Oklahoma (2022–2024); Florida State (2025); Northwestern (2026–present)
- Stats at ESPN

Gavin Sawchuk (born July 28, 2003) is an American college football running back for the Northwestern Wildcats. He previously played for the Oklahoma Sooners and Florida State Seminoles.

== Early life ==
Sawchuk attended Valor Christian High School in Highlands Ranch, Colorado. He rushed for 2,004 yards with 28 touchdowns as a senior and had 1,239 yards and 17 touchdowns as a junior. He was named the Colorado Gatorade Football Player of the Year both of those seasons. He finished his career with 5,724 yards and 85 total touchdowns. Sawchuk committed to the University of Oklahoma to play college football.

== College career ==
=== Oklahoma ===
As a true freshman at Oklahoma in 2022, Sawchuk played in two games and redshirted. He had 17 carries for 105 yards and two touchdowns, with the majority of his playing time coming in the 2022 Cheez-It Bowl. He earned more playing time throughout his redshirt freshman year in 2023. In his red-shirt freshmen season Sawchuk Earned honorable mention All-Big 12 acclaim, has played in 11 games and started each of last six, leads team with 610 rushing yards and 105 carries (team-high 5.8 yards per rush) and paces team’s running backs with eight rushing touchdowns, and has also tallied 11 receptions for 52 yards.

On April 25, 2025, Sawchuk entered the transfer portal.

=== Florida State ===
On May 4, 2025, Sawchuk committed to the Florida State Seminoles.
