= Wanya Morris (American football) =

American football player (born 2000)

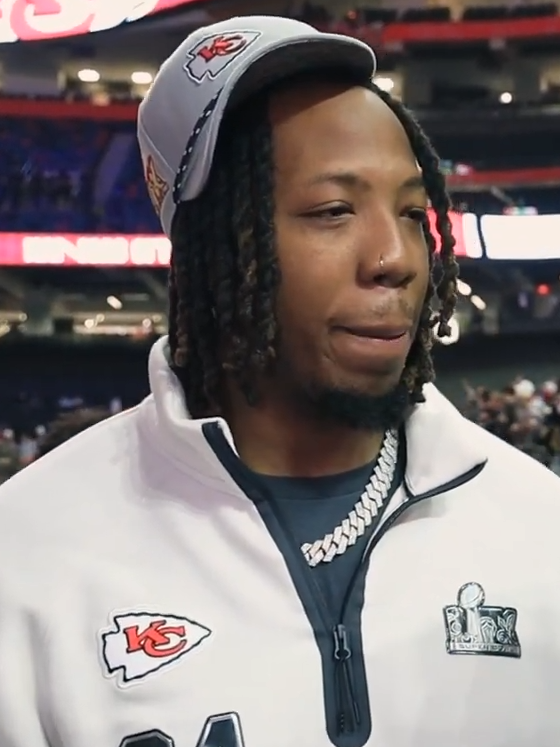
- Morris during an interview in 2025

No. 64 – Dallas Cowboys
- Position: Offensive tackle
- Roster status: Practice squad

Personal information
- Born: October 10, 2000 (age 26); Savannah, Georgia, U.S.
- Listed height: 6 ft 6 in (1.98 m)
- Listed weight: 307 lb (139 kg)

Career information
- High school: Grayson (Grayson, Georgia)
- College: Tennessee (2019–2020); Oklahoma (2021–2022)
- NFL draft: 2023: 3rd round, 92nd overall pick

Career history
- Kansas City Chiefs (2023–2025); Atlanta Falcons (2026)*; Dallas Cowboys (2026–present)*
- * Offseason or practice squad member only

Awards and highlights
- Super Bowl champion (LVIII); Second-team All-Big 12 (2022)

Career NFL statistics as of 2025
- Games played: 31
- Games started: 15
- Receiving touchdowns: 1
- Stats at Pro Football Reference

Wanya Jacques-Keyshawn Morris (born October 10, 2000) is an American professional football offensive tackle for the Dallas Cowboys of the National Football League (NFL). He played college football for the Tennessee Volunteers and Oklahoma Sooners.

== Early life ==
Morris was named for the singer bearing the same name. He attended Grayson High School in Grayson, Georgia and was a highly-regarded offensive lineman, being ranked a consensus five-star recruit and receiving attention from nearly every school nationally. Several agencies ranked him among the top-50 recruits nationally. Morris initially committed to Florida State, but then de-committed and switched to Tennessee.

== College career ==
As a true freshman in 2019, Morris started 12 of 13 games for Tennessee at left tackle, earning freshman All-SEC as well as freshman All-America honors. The following year, he posted seven starts, appearing in a further two games, out of 10. After coach Jeremy Pruitt was fired prior to the 2021 season, Morris transferred to Oklahoma. In his first year with the team, he appeared in just six games with no starts, playing only as a backup.

Morris appeared in nine games as a senior in 2022, starting eight and helping lead an offensive line that allowed Eric Gray to run for 1,364 yards and Dillon Gabriel to throw for 2,925 yards with 24 touchdowns. Although he missed two games due to a suspension and one for unspecified reasons, he was able to earn second-team All-Big 12 honors for his play. After the regular season, Morris opted to skip the team's bowl game and declare for the NFL draft.

== Professional career ==
Pre-draft measurables
Height	Weight	Arm length	Hand span	Wingspan	40-yard dash	10-yard split	20-yard split	Vertical jump	Broad jump
6 ft 5 3/8 in (1.97 m)	307 lb (139 kg)	35 1/8 in (0.89 m)	10 1/4 in (0.26 m)	7 ft 1 in (2.16 m)	5.10 s	1.73 s	2.96 s	28.5 in (0.72 m)	9 ft 3 in (2.82 m)
All values from the NFL Combine

=== Kansas City Chiefs ===
Morris was selected by the Kansas City Chiefs in the third round (92nd overall) of the 2023 NFL draft. As a rookie, Morris appeared in 14 games and started four in the 2023 season. Morris ended his rookie season as a Super Bowl champion when the Chiefs defeated the San Francisco 49ers in Super Bowl LVIII.

In the Chiefs' Week 2 victory over the Cincinnati Bengals in 2024, Morris lined up in the tight end position on a second-and-goal play, making him an eligible receiver, and scored his first NFL touchdown on a 1-yard reception from Patrick Mahomes. The following week, he assumed the starting left tackle position over rookie Kingsley Suamataia, and held the position until Week 14, when he was benched in favor of newly signed veteran D. J. Humphries.

Morris began the 2025 campaign as one of Kansas City's backup offensive linemen, making 14 appearances for the Chiefs, mainly on special teams. In Week 14 against the Houston Texans, Morris started his lone game of the season after multiple injuries to the offensive line, but was injured on the first play of the game. On December 8, 2025, it was announced that Morris had suffered a season-ending knee injury.

=== Atlanta Falcons ===
On June 16, 2026, Morris was traded to the Atlanta Falcons along with the Chiefs' 2027 seventh round pick in exchange for the Falcons' 2027 sixth round pick. He was waived by Atlanta as a part of final roster cuts on August 30.

=== Dallas Cowboys ===
On September 1, 2026, Morris was signed to the Dallas Cowboys' practice squad.

== Personal life ==
On May 16, 2024, Morris and Kansas City Chiefs teammate Chukwuebuka Godrick were arrested for misdemeanor possession of marijuana.
