= Jovantae Barnes =

American football player (born 2003)

Kentucky Wildcats
- Position: Running back
- Class: Senior

Personal information
- Born: June 25, 2003 (age 23); Orlando, Florida, U.S.
- Listed height: 6 ft 0 in (1.83 m)
- Listed weight: 207 lb (94 kg)

Career information
- High school: Desert Pines (NV)
- College: Oklahoma (2022–2025); Kentucky (2026–present)
- Stats at ESPN

Jovantae Barnes (born June 25, 2003) is an American college football running back for the Kentucky Wildcats. He previously played for the Oklahoma Sooners.

== Early life ==
Barnes was born in Orlando, Florida and grew up in Las Vegas, Nevada, where he attended Desert Pines High School. As a senior in 2021, he rushed for 567 yards and 11 touchdowns in six games.

== College career ==
Barnes enrolled at the University of Oklahoma in January 2022. As a true freshman, he was a backup to Eric Gray. He appeared in 11 games and rushed for 519 yards and five touchdowns on 116 carries, an average of 4.5 yards per carry. In the 2022 Cheez-It Bowl against Florida State, he rushed for a season-high 108 rushing yards on 27 carries.

Barnes entered the 2023 season as Oklahoma's lead running back. He was named to the Doak Walker Award watch list, and Bleacher Report correspondent Brad Shepard picked him as one of his 12 college football players who will break out in 2023.
