= Treshaun Ward =

American football player (born 2001)

No. 39
- Position: Running back

Personal information
- Born: May 26, 2001 (age 25)
- Listed height: 5 ft 10 in (1.78 m)
- Listed weight: 190 lb (86 kg)

Career information
- High school: Tampa Bay Tech (Tampa, Florida)
- College: Florida State (2019–2022); Kansas State (2023); Boston College (2024)
- NFL draft: 2025: undrafted

Career history
- Hamilton Tiger-Cats (2025)
- Stats at CFL.ca

Treshaun Ward (born May 26, 2001) is an American professional football running back. He previously played for the Hamilton Tiger-Cats of the Canadian Football League (CFL). He played college football at Florida State, Kansas State, and Boston College.

== Early life ==
Treshaun Ward was born on May 26, 2001. He grew up in Plant City, Florida, playing youth football for the Plant City Dolphins and Turkey Creek Trojans. He played high school football at Tampa Bay Technical High School in Tampa, Florida. Ward played in 13 games his junior year, rushing 183 times for 1,272 yards and scoring 15 touchdowns. As a senior in 2018, he recorded 138 carries for 1,118 yards and 14 touchdowns while also catching 15 passes for 118 yards. In the class of 2019, he was rated a three-star recruit by Rivals.com.

== College career ==
Ward originally accepted a scholarship offer to play college football for the Maryland Terrapins but later decided to walk-on at Florida State University. He played for the Florida State Seminoles from 2019 to 2022. He played in three games as a true freshman in 2019, rushing ten times for 44 yards, before redshirting the season. He was also named to the Atlantic Coast Conference (ACC) honor roll for the first of three seasons. Ward appeared in two games during the COVID-19 shortened 2020 season, totaling two rushes for 54 yards and one touchdown, and one reception for six yards. He won the team's Offense Scout Team Award. Ward went on full scholarship in spring 2021. He played in all 12 games in 2021, recording 81 rushes for 515 yards and four touchdowns, 21 catches for 185 yards and one touchdown, two kick returns for 46 yards, and one punt return for 11 yards. His 6.4 yards-per-carry was the most in the ACC that year. Ward appeared in ten games, starting six, in 2022, rushing 95 times for 628 yards and seven touchdowns while catching six passes for 19 yards. He led the ACC in yards-per-carry for the second straight season with 6.6, earning honorable mention All-ACC honors. He was a semifinalist for the Burlsworth Trophy, given to the most outstanding college football player who began his career as a walk-on. Ward majored in criminology at Florida State.

In 2023, Ward transferred to play for the Kansas State Wildcats of Kansas State University. He played in 12 games during the 2023 season, totaling 124 carries for 643 yards and five touchdowns, 17 receptions for 129 yards and two touchdowns, seven kick returns for 132 yards, and one completed pass for an eight-yard touchdown. He garnered honorable mention All-Big 12 recognition.

In 2024, Ward transferred again, this time to Boston College in order to play his final year of college football for the Boston College Eagles. In the 2024 season opener against his former team Florida State, Ward had 138 yards of total offense (including a touchdown catch) as Boston College upset No. 10 ranked Florida State by a score of 28–13. He appeared in all 12 games, starting two, as a sixth-year senior during the 2024 season, rushing 77 times for 406 yards and two touchdowns while also adding 15 receptions for 268 yards and four touchdowns.

== Professional career ==
After going undrafted in the 2025 NFL draft, Ward signed with the Hamilton Tiger-Cats of the Canadian Football League on May 16, 2025. He was moved to the practice roster on June 1, promoted to the active roster on June 26, moved back to the practice roster on July 3, and promoted to the active roster again on July 11, 2025. He dressed in three games overall for the Tiger-Cats during the 2025 season, rushing eight times for 34 yards and one touchdown while also catching six passes for 37 yards on seven targets. Ward was released on September 4, 2025.
