= Anton Harrison =

American football player (born 2002)

No. 77 – Jacksonville Jaguars
- Position: Offensive tackle
- Roster status: Injured reserve

Personal information
- Born: February 2, 2002 (age 24); Washington, D.C., U.S.
- Listed height: 6 ft 4 in (1.93 m)
- Listed weight: 315 lb (143 kg)

Career information
- High school: Archbishop Carroll (Washington, D.C.)
- College: Oklahoma (2020–2022)
- NFL draft: 2023: 1st round, 27th overall pick

Career history
- Jacksonville Jaguars (2023–present)

Awards and highlights
- First-team All-Big 12 (2022); Second-team All-Big 12 (2021); Under Armour All-American (2022)

Career NFL statistics as of 2025
- Games started: 48
- Games played: 48
- Stats at Pro Football Reference

Anton Christopher Harrison (born February 2, 2002) is an American professional football offensive tackle for the Jacksonville Jaguars of the National Football League (NFL). He played college football for the Oklahoma Sooners and was selected by the Jaguars in the first round of the 2023 NFL draft.

== Early life ==
Harrison attended Archbishop Carroll High School in Washington, D.C., where he played football and basketball. He was selected to play in the 2019 Under Armour All-American Game. Harrison played offensive tackle for the Oklahoma Sooners from 2020 to 2022.

== Professional career ==
Pre-draft measurables
Height	Weight	Arm length	Hand span	Wingspan	40-yard dash	10-yard split	20-yard split	20-yard shuttle	Vertical jump	Broad jump	Bench press
6 ft 4 3/8 in (1.94 m)	315 lb (143 kg)	34 1/8 in (0.87 m)	9 1/4 in (0.23 m)	6 ft 8 3/4 in (2.05 m)	4.98 s	1.77 s	2.87 s	4.84 s	28.5 in (0.72 m)	8 ft 9 in (2.67 m)	24 reps
All values from NFL Combine/Pro Day

Harrison was selected by the Jacksonville Jaguars in the first round, 27th overall, of the 2023 NFL draft. As a rookie, Harrison started in all 17 games for the Jaguars in the 2023 season. In the 2024 season, he started in 16 games. In the 2025 season, Harrison started in 15 games.

On April 20, 2026, the Jaguars exercised the fifth-year option on Harrison's contract.

On October 13, 2026, Harrison was placed on injured reserve.
