= Nic Anderson =

American football player (born 2004)

No. 4 – Kentucky Wildcats
- Position: Wide receiver
- Class: (redshirt) Senior

Personal information
- Born: March 19, 2004 (age 22); Plano, Texas, U.S.
- Listed height: 6 ft 4 in (1.93 m)
- Listed weight: 205 lb (93 kg)

Career information
- High school: Katy (Katy, Texas)
- College: Oklahoma (2022–2024); LSU (2025); Kentucky (2026–present)
- Stats at ESPN

Nicholas Anderson (born March 19, 2004) is an American college football wide receiver for the Kentucky Wildcats. He previously played for the Oklahoma Sooners and LSU Tigers.

== Early life ==
Anderson was born on March 19, 2004, in Plano, Texas and grew up in Katy, Texas. He caught 29 passes for 529 yards and five touchdowns as a senior at Katy High School. Anderson initially committed to play college football at Oregon over offers from Notre Dame, Penn State, and USC. He later flipped his commitment to Oklahoma.

== College career ==
Anderson redshirted his true freshman season with the Oklahoma Sooners. He began seeing regular playing time as a redshirt freshman. Anderson was named the Big 12 Conference Player of the Week after catching three passes, all for touchdowns, for 120 yards against Tulsa.

On December 5, 2024, Anderson announced that he would enter the NCAA transfer portal.

On December 17, 2024, Anderson announced that he would transfer to LSU.

== Personal life ==
Anderson's brother, Rodney Anderson, played running back at Oklahoma and for the Cincinnati Bengals in the NFL. His brother Ryder is a former NFL defensive end who spent time with the New York Giants and New Orleans Saints organizations. His uncle, Mark Anderson played as a defensive end for the NFL.
