= Jalil Farooq =

American football player (born 2001)

No. 1 – Maryland Terrapins
- Position: Wide receiver
- Class: Redshirt Senior

Personal information
- Born: September 13, 2001 (age 25)
- Listed height: 6 ft 0 in (1.83 m)
- Listed weight: 205 lb (93 kg)

Career information
- High school: Dr. Henry A. Wise Jr. (Upper Marlboro, Maryland)
- College: Oklahoma (2021–2024); Maryland (2025–present)
- Stats at ESPN

Jalil Farooq (born September 13, 2001) is an American college football wide receiver for the Maryland Terrapins. He previously played for the Oklahoma Sooners.

== Early life ==
Farooq attended Dr. Henry A. Wise Jr. High School located in Prince George's County, Maryland. Coming out of high school, he was rated as a four star recruit, where he committed to play college football for the Oklahoma Sooners, over Maryland.

== College career ==
=== Oklahoma ===
In his true freshman season in 2021, he brought in just four receptions for 69 yards. During the 2022 season, Farooq tallied 37 receptions for 466 yards and five touchdowns. In week six of the 2023 season, he notched five receptions for 130 yards, 13 rushing yards, and 37 kickoff return yards in a victory over rival Texas. He finished the 2023 season, totaling 45 receptions for 694 yards and two touchdowns, while also adding 94 yards on the ground. In week one of the 2024 season, Farooq hauled in one reception for 47 yards in a win over Temple, but suffered a broken foot. Farooq finished the 2024 season, only starting in two games due to injury, where he recorded three receptions for 58 yards. After the conclusion of the 2024 season, he decided to enter his name into the NCAA transfer portal.

=== Maryland ===
Farooq transferred to play for the Maryland Terrapins. Heading into the 2025 season, he is projected to be one of the Terrapins top players, where he will compete for a starting spot at receiver. He won the starting receiver job and served as the main target for quarterback Malik Washington.

== Professional career ==
Pre-draft measurables
| Height | Weight | Arm length | Hand span | Wingspan | 40-yard dash | 10-yard split | 20-yard split | 20-yard shuttle | Three-cone drill | Vertical jump | Broad jump | Bench press |
|---|---|---|---|---|---|---|---|---|---|---|---|---|
| 6 ft 0 1/2 in (1.84 m) | 205 lb (93 kg) | 31 in (0.79 m) | 8 3/4 in (0.22 m) | 6 ft 3 1/4 in (1.91 m) | 4.62 s | 1.61 s | 2.73 s | 4.50 s | 7.39 s | 30.0 in (0.76 m) | 9 ft 5 in (2.87 m) | 9 reps |
All values from Pro Day

== Personal life ==
On November 2, 2023, Farooq was arrested after a traffic stop on traffic violations and for having four outstanding municipal warrants.
