= Brent Venables =

American football player and coach (born 1970)

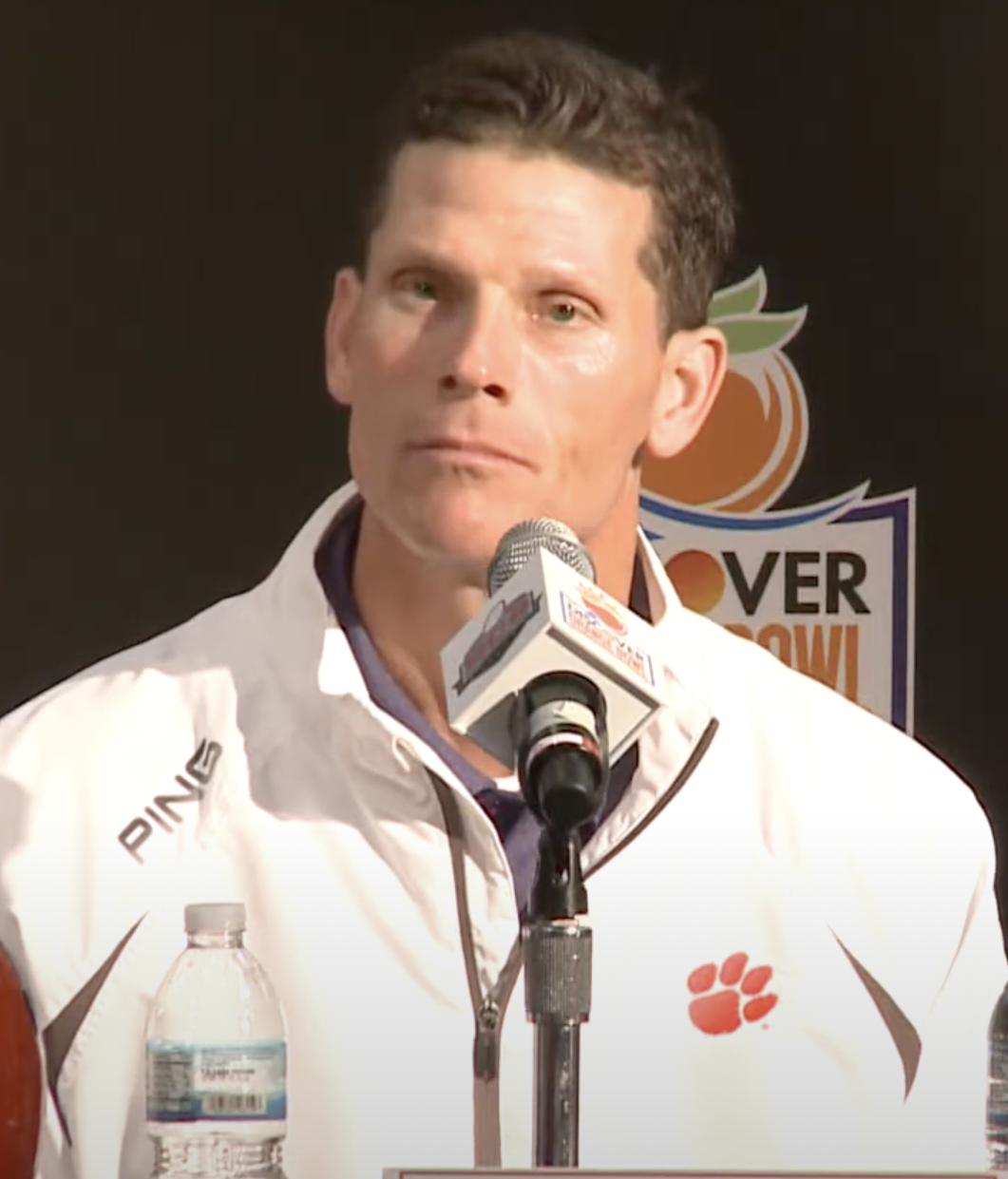
- Venables in 2013

Current position
- Title: Head coach
- Team: Oklahoma
- Conference: SEC
- Record: 39–24
- Annual salary: $8.5 million

Biographical details
- Born: December 18, 1970 (age 55); Homestead, Florida, U.S.
- Education: Kansas State University (1992)

Playing career
- 1989–1990: Garden City
- 1991–1992: Kansas State
- Position: Linebacker

Coaching career (HC unless noted)
- 1993–1995: Kansas State (GA)
- 1996–1998: Kansas State (LB)
- 1999–2003: Oklahoma (co-DC/LB)
- 2004–2011: Oklahoma (AHC/DC/LB)
- 2012–2017: Clemson (DC/LB)
- 2018–2021: Clemson (AHC/DC/LB)
- 2022–present: Oklahoma

Head coaching record
- Overall: 39–24
- Bowls: 0–4
- Tournaments: 0–1 (CFP)

Accomplishments and honors

Awards
- Broyles Award (2016)

Thomas Brent Venables (born December 18, 1970) is an American college football coach who is the head football coach at the University of Oklahoma, a position he has held since the 2022 season. Venables served as the associate head coach, defensive coordinator, and linebackers coach at Clemson University from 2012 to 2021. He was awarded the Broyles Award in 2016.

Venables played football at Kansas State University as a linebacker from 1991 to 1992.

== Early life and playing career ==
Venables was born in Homestead, Florida and was raised in Salina, Kansas. From 1989 to 1990, he played linebacker at Garden City Community College then at Kansas State University under head coach Bill Snyder from 1991 to 1992. He was a member of Sigma Phi Epsilon at Kansas State.

== Coaching career (1993-present) ==
=== Early career ===
In 1993, Venables began his coaching career at Kansas State as a graduate assistant. In 1996, Venables was promoted to linebackers coach and served in that capacity until 1998.

=== Oklahoma ===
In 1999, Venables began coaching at the University of Oklahoma, where he served as co-defensive coordinator and linebackers coach for the Sooners winning a national championship in 2000 under head coach Bob Stoops, with whom he previously worked at Kansas State. He shared oversight of the defense with Stoops’ younger brother, Mike Stoops, until Mike became head coach at Arizona in 2004. Venables then became sole defensive coordinator, and was also promoted to associate head coach.

In 2006, he was one of five finalists for the Broyles Award for the nation's top assistant coach.

=== Clemson ===
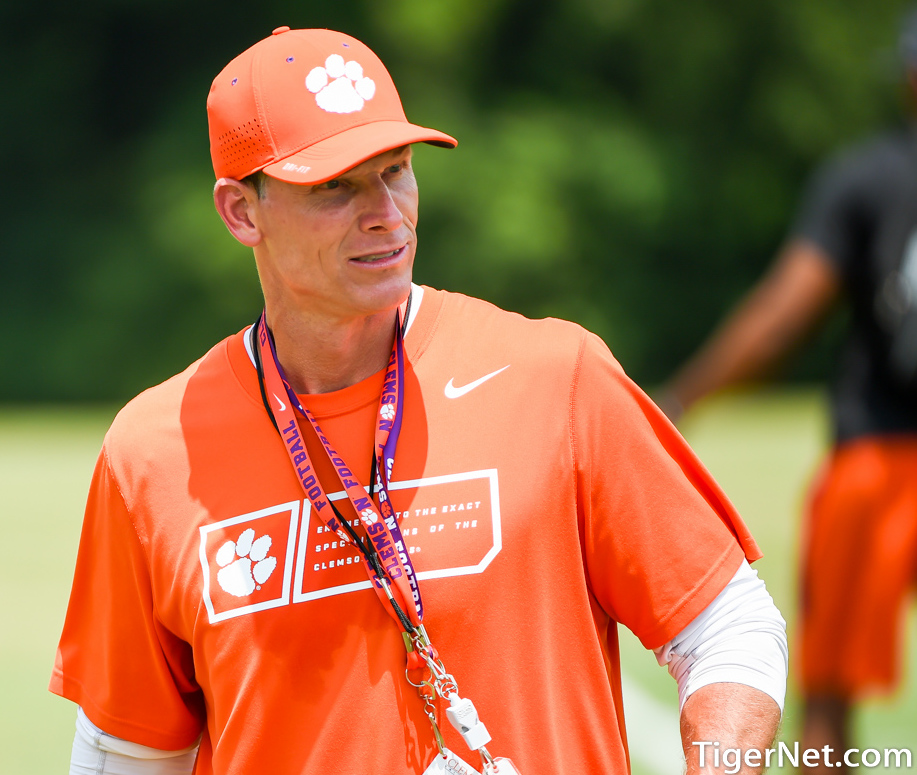
Venables at Clemson

In January 2012, after it was announced that Mike Stoops would be returning to Oklahoma to resume the defensive coordinator position he had held until 2004, Venables accepted the position of defensive coordinator at Clemson, where his salary was expected to be between $750,000 and $1 million. Venables had been previously reported to be a candidate for the head coaching position at a number of schools including Miami, Kansas, Kansas State, and Texas Tech.

On December 6, 2016, Venables was named the winner of the 2016 Broyles Award for the nation's top assistant coach. Venables was soon promoted to associate head coach.

Clemson Diehards reported on December 6, 2017, that Venables was the second-highest paid assistant football coach in college football that year, receiving $1.7 million from Clemson. The only coach in this category receiving more money was Dave Aranda of LSU, who was paid $1.8 million.

=== Oklahoma (as head coach) ===
On December 5, 2021, Venables was named the 23rd head coach at the University of Oklahoma, replacing Lincoln Riley after his departure to become the head coach at the University of Southern California (USC).

On August 20, 2026, Venables agreed to a six–year contract with Oklahoma, which added two years to his current deal worth a total of $63 million.

== Personal life ==
Venables and his wife have four children, two sons and two daughters. He is a Christian.

== Head coaching record ==
Year	Team	Overall	Conference	Standing	Bowl/playoffs	Coaches^{#}	AP^{°}
Oklahoma Sooners (Big 12 Conference) (2022–2023)
2022	Oklahoma	6–7	3–6	T–7th	L Cheez-It		
2023	Oklahoma	10–3	7–2	T–2nd	L Alamo	15	15
Oklahoma Sooners (Southeastern Conference) (2024–present)
2024	Oklahoma	6–7	2–6	T–13th	L Armed Forces		
2025	Oklahoma	10–3	6–2	T–5th	L CFP First Round^{†}	10	13
2026	Oklahoma	7–4	5−3				
Oklahoma:		39–24	23–19				
Total:		39–24					
^{†}Indicates Bowl Coalition, Bowl Alliance, BCS, or CFP / New Years' Six bowl.; ^{#}Rankings from final Coaches Poll.; ^{°}Rankings from final AP Poll.
