= 101.5 FM =

FM radio frequency

The following radio stations broadcast on FM frequency 101.5 MHz:

== Argentina ==
- LRI405 in Arteaga, Santa Fe
- Radio María in Córdoba
- Radio María in Ituzaingo, Corrientes
- Radio María in Río Grande, Tierra del Fuego
- Radio María in Monte Quemado, Santiago del Estero
- Radio María in Barrancas, Santa Fe
- Radio María in Elortondo, Santa Fe

== Australia ==
- Sky Sports Radio in Grafton, New South Wales
- 4OUR in Caboolture, Queensland
- ABC Classic in Townsville, Queensland
- ABC Classic in Latrobe Valley, Victoria
- 3BBS in Bendigo, Victoria
- 5UV in Adelaide, South Australia
- Triple J in Canberra, Australian Capital Territory
- 4RGK in Rockhampton, Queensland

== Canada (Channel 268) ==
- CBCA-FM in Attawapiskat, Ontario
- CBCF-FM in Fort Hope, Ontario
- CBFV-FM in Waswanipi, Quebec
- CBGA-15-FM in L'anse a Valleau, Quebec
- CBKB-FM in Beauval, Saskatchewan
- CBK-FM-2 in Warmley, Saskatchewan
- CBMT-FM in La Tabatiere, Quebec
- CBNG-FM in Glovertown, Newfoundland and Labrador
- CBRX-FM in Rimouski, Quebec
- CBTJ-FM in Hampden, Newfoundland and Labrador
- CBVN-FM in New-Carlisle, Quebec
- CBVS-FM in Mistassini, Quebec
- CBWH-FM in Grand Rapids, Manitoba
- CBWR-FM in Little Grand Rapids, Manitoba
- CBZ-FM in Saint John, New Brunswick
- CHFA-6-FM in Fort McMurray, Alberta
- CHQX-FM in Prince Albert, Saskatchewan
- CHTI-FM in Timmins, Ontario
- CIBL-FM in Montreal, Quebec
- CIGO-FM in Port Hawkesbury, Nova Scotia
- CILK-FM in Kelowna, British Columbia
- CIOI-FM in Hamilton, Ontario
- CJGL-FM in Gladstone, Manitoba
- CJKL-FM in Kirkland Lake, Ontario
- CJUM-FM in Winnipeg, Manitoba
- CKCE-FM in Calgary, Alberta
- CKMO-FM in Orangeville, Ontario
- CKNL-FM in Fort St. John, British Columbia
- CKWF-FM in Peterborough, Ontario
- VF2004 in Granisle, British Columbia
- VF2374 in New Denver, British Columbia
- VF2535 in Terrace, British Columbia
- VF2556 in Crescent Valley, British Columbia

== China ==
- CNR The Voice of China in Conghua

== Greece ==
- Radio Kriti in Crete

== Israel ==
- Radio Darom in Ashdod, Ashkelon, Hevel Lakhish and the Gaza Envelope

== Malaysia ==
- Raaga in Seremban, Negeri Sembilan
- Lite in Ipoh, Perak

== Mexico ==
- XHABO-FM in Cabo San Lucas, Baja California Sur
- XHAS-FM in Nuevo Laredo, Tamaulipas
- XHAVO-FM in Rio Bravo, Tamaulipas
- XHBB-FM in Acapulco, Guerrero
- XHDB-FM in Tonalá, Chiapas
- XHEPAR-FM in Villahermosa, Tabasco
- XHJY-FM in Autlán de Navarro, Jalisco
- XHPCOM-FM in Comitán de Domínguez, Chiapas
- XHVLO-FM in Guanajuato, Guanajuato
- XHWK-FM in Guadalajara, Jalisco
- XHYK-FM in Conkal (Mérida), Yucatán

== Philippines ==
- DWQW in Naga City
- DWWG in Cabanatuan City
- DWEJ in Lucena City
- K5 News FM Bacolod in Bacolod City
- DXRL in Cagayan de Oro City
- DXWK in General Santos City
- Juander Radyo in Tandag City

== United States (Channel 268) ==
- KALV-FM in Phoenix, Arizona
- KAMB in Merced, California
- KAOY in Kealakekua, Hawaii
- KATW in Lewiston, Idaho
- KBWV-LP in Bacavi, Arizona
- KCCL in Woodland, California
- KCGN in Ortonville, Minnesota
- KCLS in Leeds, Utah
- KCVI in Blackfoot, Idaho
- KCYR-LP in Kerrville, Texas
- KDDV-FM in Wright, Wyoming
- KDLZ in The Dalles, Oregon
- KDNH-LP in Marshalltown, Iowa
- KEKA in Eureka, California
- KEMJ in Saint James, Minnesota
- KEPJ-LP in San Antonio, Texas
- KFGI in Crosby, Minnesota
- KFGM-FM in Frenchtown, Montana
- KFLY in Corvallis, Oregon
- KFQM-LP in Los Angeles, California
- KGB in San Diego, California
- KGFI-LP in Anaheim, California
- KGFM in Bakersfield, California
- KGJX in Fruita, Colorado
- KHSX-LP in Houston, Texas
- KIDX in Ruidoso, New Mexico
- KIEF-LP in Three Forks, Montana
- KIKS-FM in Iola, Kansas
- KIXF in Baker, California
- KIZS in Collinsville, Oklahoma
- KJHM in Watkins, Colorado
- KKSI in Eddyville, Iowa
- KLBL in Malvern, Arkansas
- KLBQ in Junction City, Arkansas
- KLJJ-LP in Spring, Texas
- KMKF in Manhattan, Kansas
- KNAH in Oakley, Utah
- KNUE in Tyler, Texas
- KOAR in Beebe, Arkansas
- KOCC-LP in Oxnard, California
- KOCD in Okeene, Oklahoma
- KOCI-LP in Newport Beach, California
- KOCL-LP in Anaheim, California
- KOER-LP in Cypress, Texas
- KORM-LP in Corona, California
- KPLA in Columbia, Missouri
- KPLZ in Seattle, Washington
- KQBH-LP in Los Angeles, California
- KQSG-LP in El Monte, California
- KRJM in Mahnomen, Minnesota
- KRJY-LP in Yuma, Arizona
- KRMQ-FM in Clovis, New Mexico
- KROJ-LP in Panorama City, California
- KROR in Hastings, Nebraska
- KROX in Buda, Texas
- KSMM-FM in Liberal, Kansas
- KSNY in Snyder, Texas
- KSSS in Bismarck, North Dakota
- KSTG-LP in Lodi, California
- KSZN-LP in Flagstaff, Arizona
- KTAL-LP in Las Cruces, New Mexico
- KTKE in Truckee, California
- KTNN-FM in Tohatchi, New Mexico
- KUEH-LP in Yselta del Sur Pueblo, Texas
- KVCX in Gregory, South Dakota
- KVRN-LP in Portland, Oregon
- KVSF in Pecos, New Mexico
- KXAQ-LP in Liberty, Texas
- KXEP-LP in San Antonio, Texas
- KXVB in Greenland, Arkansas
- KYLP-LP in Greenville, Texas
- KYQT-LP in Portland, Oregon
- KZCL-LP in Cleveland, Texas
- KZKA-LP in Los Angeles, California
- KZNQ-LP in Santa Clarita, California
- KZYQ in Eudora, Arkansas
- WABZ-LP in Albemarle, North Carolina
- WAYZ in Waynesboro, Pennsylvania
- WBAC-LP in Belmont, North Carolina
- WBGW-FM in Fort Branch, Indiana
- WBLY-LP in Sycamore, Georgia
- WBNQ in Bloomington, Illinois
- WBQB in Fredericksburg, Virginia
- WCFA-LP in Cape May, New Jersey
- WCIL in Carbondale, Illinois
- WCLI-FM in Enon, Ohio
- WCWT in Centerville, Ohio
- WDAA in Bruce, Mississippi
- WDKC in Covington, Pennsylvania
- WELX in Isabela, Puerto Rico
- WFTZ in Manchester, Tennessee
- WHDZ in Buxton, North Carolina
- WHRU-LP in Huntley, Illinois
- WIBA in Madison, Wisconsin
- WJNR in Iron Mountain, Michigan
- WKFY in East Harwich, Massachusetts
- WKHX in Marietta, Georgia
- WKKG in Columbus, Indiana
- WKMO-FM in Vine Grove, Kentucky
- WKXW in Trenton, New Jersey
- WLCB-LP in Burlington, Wisconsin
- WLGS-LP in Lake Villa, Illinois
- WLXX in Richmond, Kentucky
- WLYF in Miami, Florida
- WMFB-LP in Charlotte, North Carolina
- WMJZ in Gaylord, Michigan
- WMTE in Manistee, Michigan
- WMUD (FM) in Brandon, Vermont
- WMXO in Olean, New York
- WMXV in Saint Joseph, Tennessee
- WNSN in South Bend, Indiana
- WNWS in Jackson, Tennessee
- WORD in Pittsburgh, Pennsylvania
- WPDH in Poughkeepsie, New York
- WQEM in Columbiana, Alabama
- WQML in Ceiba, Puerto Rico
- WQUT in Johnson City, Tennessee
- WRAL (FM) in Raleigh, North Carolina
- WRCD in Canton, New York
- WRSY in Marlboro, Vermont
- WRTH-LP in Greenville, South Carolina
- WRVF in Toledo, Ohio
- WSOL-FM in Yulee, Florida
- WTBV in Saint Petersburg, Florida
- WTKX in Pensacola, Florida
- WVES in Chincoteague, Virginia
- WVFB in Celina, Tennessee
- WWBB in Providence, Rhode Island
- WWBN in Tuscola, Michigan
- WWGI-LP in Fayette, Mississippi
- WWJC in Augusta, Wisconsin
- WWLK-FM in Meredith, New Hampshire
- WWUN-FM in Friar's Point, Mississippi
- WXBW in Gallipolis, Ohio
- WXHC in Homer, New York
- WXMB-LP in Myrtle Beach, South Carolina
- WXNA-LP in Nashville, Tennessee
- WXSR in Quincy, Florida
- WYHR in Vinton, Virginia
- WYNK in Baton Rouge, Louisiana
