= 2021 Oregon Ducks football team =

American college football season

2021 Oregon Ducks football

Pac-12 North champion

Pac-12 Championship Game, L 10–38 vs. Utah

Alamo Bowl, L 32–47 vs. Oklahoma
- Conference: Pac-12 Conference
- North Division

Ranking
- Coaches: No. 21
- AP: No. 22
- Record: 10–4 (7–2 Pac-12)
- Head coach: Mario Cristobal (4th season; regular season); Bryan McClendon (interim; bowl game)
- Offensive coordinator: Joe Moorhead (2nd season)
- Offensive scheme: Spread
- Defensive coordinator: Tim DeRuyter (1st season)
- Co-defensive coordinators: Joe Salave'a (4th season); Ken Wilson (1st season)
- Base defense: 3–4
- Captain: Game captains
- Home stadium: Autzen Stadium

2021 Pac-12 Conference football standings
	Conf.			Overall
Team	W		L	W		L
North Division
No. 22 Oregon xy	7	–	2	10	–	4
Washington State	6	–	3	7	–	6
Oregon State	5	–	4	7	–	6
California	4	–	5	5	–	7
Washington	3	–	6	4	–	8
Stanford	2	–	7	3	–	9
South Division
No. 12 Utah xy$	8	–	1	10	–	4
UCLA	6	–	3	8	–	4
Arizona State†	0	–	3	0	–	5
USC	3	–	6	4	–	8
Colorado	3	–	6	4	–	8
Arizona	1	–	8	1	–	11
Championship: Utah 38, Oregon 10
$ – Conference champion; x – Division champion/co-champions; y – Championship game participant; Rankings from AP Poll

The 2021 Oregon Ducks football team represented the University of Oregon during the 2021 NCAA Division I FBS football season. The team was led by fourth-year head coach Mario Cristobal, who left the program to take the head coaching job at Miami in early December. The Ducks played their home games at Autzen Stadium in Eugene, Oregon, and competed as members of the North Division of the Pac-12 Conference.

== Schedule ==
Date	Time	Opponent	Rank	Site	TV	Result	Attendance
September 4	11:00 a.m.	Fresno State*	No. 11	Autzen Stadium; Eugene, OR	P12N	W 31–24	43,276
September 11	9:00 a.m.	at No. 3 Ohio State*	No. 12	Ohio Stadium; Columbus, OH (Big Noon Kickoff)	FOX	W 35–28	100,482
September 18	4:30 p.m.	Stony Brook*	No. 4	Autzen Stadium; Eugene, OR	P12N	W 48–7	42,782
September 25	7:30 p.m.	Arizona	No. 3	Autzen Stadium; Eugene, OR	ESPN	W 41–19	50,024
October 2	12:30 p.m.	at Stanford	No. 3	Stanford Stadium; Stanford, CA (rivalry)	ABC	L 24–31 ^{OT}	31,610
October 15	7:30 p.m.	California	No. 9	Autzen Stadium; Eugene, OR	ESPN	W 24–17	50,008
October 23	12:30 p.m.	at UCLA	No. 10	Rose Bowl; Pasadena, CA (College GameDay)	ABC	W 34–31	55,675
October 30	12:30 p.m.	Colorado	No. 7	Autzen Stadium; Eugene, OR	FOX	W 52–29	51,449
November 6	4:30 p.m.	at Washington	No. 4	Husky Stadium; Seattle, WA (rivalry)	ABC	W 26–16	63,193
November 13	7:30 p.m.	Washington State	No. 3	Autzen Stadium; Eugene, OR	ESPN	W 38–24	52,327
November 20	4:30 p.m.	at No. 23 Utah	No. 3	Rice–Eccles Stadium; Salt Lake City, UT	ABC	L 7–38	52,724
November 27	12:30 p.m.	Oregon State	No. 11	Autzen Stadium; Eugene, OR (rivalry)	ESPN	W 38–29	56,408
December 3	6:00 p.m.	vs. No. 17 Utah	No. 10	Allegiant Stadium; Paradise, NV (Pac-12 Championship Game)	ABC	L 10–38	56,511
December 29	6:15 p.m.	vs. No. 16 Oklahoma*	No. 14	Alamodome; San Antonio, TX (Alamo Bowl)	ESPN	L 32–47	59,121
*Non-conference game; Rankings from AP Poll (and CFP Rankings, after November 2) - Released prior to game; All times are in Pacific time

== Rankings ==
Ranking movements Legend: ██ Increase in ranking ██ Decrease in ranking
	Week															
Poll	Pre	1	2	3	4	5	6	7	8	9	10	11	12	13	14	Final
AP	11	12	4	3	3	8	9	10	7	7	5	4	11	10	15	22
Coaches	12	11	4	4	3	9	10	10	8	7	6	5	11	10	15	22
CFP	Not released									4	3	3	11	10	14	Not released

== Roster ==
2021 Oregon Ducks football team roster
Players
Coaches
Offense

Pos.	#	Name	Class
RB	0	Seven McGee	Fr
RB	1	Trey Benson	Fr
WR	2	Devon Williams	So
WR	3	Johnny Johnson III	Sr
RB	5	Sean Dollars	Fr
QB	6	Robby Ashford	Fr
WR	6	Jaylon Redd	Sr
RB	7	C. J. Verdell	Jr
TE	8	Moliki Matavao	Fr
QB	9	Jay Butterfield	Fr
WR	10	Dont'e Thornton	Fr
WR	11	Troy Franklin	Fr
QB	12	A. J. Abbott	Fr
TE	12	D. J. Johnson	Jr
QB	13	Anthony Brown	Sr
WR	14	Kris Hutson	Fr
WR	15	Isaiah Brevard	Fr
QB	16	Bradley Yaffe	So
QB	17	Ty Thompson	Fr
TE	18	Spencer Webb	Fr
TE	19	Terrance Ferguson	Fr
WR	20	Tevin Jeannis	So
RB	21	Byron Cardwell	Fr
RB	22	Cross Patton	Fr
WR	23	Jack Vecchi	Jr
WR	25	Spencer Curtis	Fr
RB	26	Travis Dye	Jr
RB	30	Renoldo Spivey Jr.	Fr
RB	31	La'Vaughn Luellen	Fr
RB	34	Aaron Smith	Fr
TE	45	Cooper Shults	Fr
TE	49	Tyler Nanney	Fr
OL	51	Jonah Miller	Fr
OL	53	Ryan Walk	Jr
OL	55	Marcus Harper II	Fr
OL	56	T. J. Bass	Jr
OL	58	Jackson Powers-Johnson	Fr
OL	59	Devin Lewis	So
OL	60	Kanen Rossi	Fr
OL	61	Logan Sagapolu	Fr
OL	64	Kai Arneson	Fr
OL	65	Charlie Pickard	Fr
OL	66	Jonathan Dennis	Fr
OL	67	Cole Young	Fr
OL	69	Bailey Jaramillo	Fr
OL	70	Dawson Jaramillo	So
OL	71	Malaesala Aumavae-Laulu	Jr
OL	72	Bram Walden	Fr
OL	73	Jaylan Jeffers	Fr
OL	74	Steven Jones	So
OL	75	Faaope Laloulu	Fr
OL	77	George Moore	Sr
OL	78	Alex Forsyth	Jr
TE	81	Patrick Herbert	Fr
WR	82	Korbin Williams	So
WR	83	Josh Delgado	So
TE	84	Cameron McCormick	Jr
WR	86	Lance Wilhoite	Fr
WR	87	Von Reames	Fr
WR	88	Isaah Crocker	So

Defense

Pos.	#	Name	Class
CB	0	D. J. James	So
ILB	1	Noah Sewell	Fr
CB	2	Mykael Wright	So
DE	3	Brandon Dorlus	So
S	4	Daymon David	Fr
DE	5	Kayvon Thibodeaux	So
S	7	Steve Stephens IV	So
CB	8	Dontae Manning	Fr
OLB	9	Jaden Navarrette	Fr
ILB	10	Justin Flowe	Fr
CB	11	Trikweze Bridges	Fr
CB	13	Bryan Addison	So
CB	14	Jaylin Davies	Fr
S	15	Bennett Williams	Jr
CB	16	Donj'real Brooks	Fr
OLB	17	Jabril McNeil	Fr
S	19	Jamal Hill	So
ILB	21	Keith Brown	Fr
CB	22	Darren Barkins	Fr
S	23	Verone McKinley III	So
S	24	J. J. Greenfield	Fr
OLB	25	Jonathan Flowe	Fr
S	27	Marko Vidackovic	Fr
CB	28	Avante Dickerson	Fr
OLB	29	Adrian Jackson	So
S	32	Jordan Happle	Sr
S	33	Jeffrey Bassa	Fr
OLB	34	Terrell Tilmon	Fr
ILB	35	Micah Roth	Jr
CB	36	Timon Davis	Fr
S	37	Max Wysocki	Fr
S	38	Lucas Noland	So
S	39	Dane Sipos	Fr
ILB	42	Jackson Laduke	Fr
OLB	43	Brandon Buckner	Fr
CB	43	Devin Morrow	Fr
DE	44	Bradyn Swinson	Fr
ILB	46	Nate Heaukulani	Sr
OLB	47	Mase Funa	So
OLB	48	Treven Ma'ae	Fr
DT	50	Popo Aumavae	Jr
DL	51	Louis Cresto	Fr
DT	52	Jaylen Smith	Fr
ILB	54	Dru Mathis	Sr
ILB	56	T. J. Gilbert	Fr
DT	90	Jake Shipley	Fr
DT	91	Kristian Williams	Fr
DL	92	Miguel Nevarez	So
DT	93	Jayson Jones	Fr
DT	94	Sua'ava Poti	Fr
DT	95	Keyon Ware-Hudson	Fr
DT	97	Maceal Afaese	Fr
DL	99	Keanu Williams	Fr

Special teams

Pos.	#	Name	Class
P	31	Race Mahlum	Fr
P	38	Tom Snee	So
LS	47	Peyton Yanagi	So
K	49	Camden Lewis	So
LS	57	Luke Basso	Fr
LS	63	Karsten Battles	Jr
K	93	Cristiano Palazzo	Fr
P	94	Will Hutchinson	Fr
K	99	Henry Katleman	So

Head coach

- Mario Cristobal

Coordinators/assistant coaches

- Joe Salave'a – Associate head coach / Co-defensive coordinator / Run Game Coordinator / defensive line
- Alex Mirabal – Associate head coach / offensive line
- Bryan McClendon – Interim Head Coach / Passing Game Coordinator / wide receivers
- Tim DeRuyter – Co-defensive coordinator / Outside Linebackers
- Joe Moorhead – Offensive Coordinator / Quarterbacks
- Ken Wilson – Co-defensive coordinator / inside linebackers
- Bobby Williams – Special teams coordinator / tight ends
- Rod Chance – Cornerbacks
- Jim Mastro – Running Backs / Run Game Coordinator
- Marcel Yates – Secondary / pass game coordinator
- Aaron Feld – Strength and Conditioning Coordinator
- Mason Baggett – Assistant Strength Coach
- Mark Davis – Assistant Strength Coach
- Jeff Eaton – Assistant Strength Coach
- Shaud Williams – Assistant Strength Coach
- Kwame Agyeman – Defensive Analyst
- Jimmy Brumbaugh – Defensive Analyst
- Nate Costa – Offensive Analyst
- David Gilbertson – Offensive Analyst
- Chris Norris – Special Teams Analyst
- Nick Toth – Defensive Analyst
- Cody Woodiel – Offensive Analyst
- Kirk Barron – Graduate Assistant
- Winston DeLattiboudere – Graduate Assistant
- Jalen Ortiz – Graduate Assistant
- Matt Noyer – Director, Football Operations
- Kodi Look – Director, Football Administration
- J. R. Moala – Director, Recruiting Operations
- Sam Popper – Director, Recruiting Strategy
- Spencer Henkle – Director, On-Campus Recruiting
- Oscar Monnier – Recruiting Assistant
- Tony Washington Jr. – Director, Player Development
- Don Johnson – Director, Player Personnel
- Eden Mahina – Director, Player Academic Development
- Cassidy Noyer – Director, External Relations
- Josh Heim – Director, Digital Media
- Gio Aguilar – Video Coordinator
- Heath Mosier – Video Coordinator
- Steve Poehl – Video Production Coordinator
- Kenny Farr – Football Equipment Administrator
- Austin Cruz – Equipment Manager
- Jordan Troester – Director, Performance & Sports Science
- Ben McKay – Sports Science Coordinator

Legend

- (C) Team captain
- (S) Suspended
- (I) Ineligible
- Injured
- Redshirt

Roster

== Game summaries ==
=== vs Fresno State ===
Fresno State Bulldogs at No. 11 Oregon Ducks – Game summary

Quarter	1	2	3	4	Total
Bulldogs	0	13	8	3	24
No. 11 Ducks	14	7	0	10	31

at Autzen Stadium • Eugene, OR

- Date: September 4, 2021
- Game time: 11:00 a.m. PDT
- Game weather: 66 °F (19 °C); Overcast;
- Game attendance: 43,276
- Referee: Mark Duddy
- TV announcers (P12N): Roxy Bernstein (Play-By-Play), Lincoln Kennedy (Analyst)

Game information

First quarter

- (8:07) ORE – C. J. Verdell 2-yard run, Camden Lewis kick (Drive: 3 plays, 3 yards, 1:11; Oregon 7–0)
- (6:40) ORE – Travis Dye 4-yard run, Camden Lewis kick (Drive: 3 plays, 27 yards, 0:58; Oregon 14–0)

Second quarter

- (14:16) FRES – Abraham Montano 33-yard run field goal (Drive: 12 plays, 69 yards, 5:13; Oregon 14–3)
- (3:31) FRES – Abraham Montano 39-yard run field goal (Drive: 14 plays, 68 yards, 6:09; Oregon 14–6)
- (1:16) ORE – Johnny Johnson III 32-yard pass from Anthony Brown, Camden Lewis kick (Drive: 6 plays, 74 yards, 2:15; Oregon 21–6)
- (0:07) FRES – Jalen Cropper 17-yard pass from Jake Haener, Adam Montano kick (Drive: 10 plays, 79 yards, 1:09; Oregon 21–13)

Third quarter

- (6:45) FRES – Jake Haener 2-yard run, Juan Rodriguez–Jake Haener 2-point pass (Drive: 9 plays, 85 yards, 4:26; Tied 21–21)

Fourth quarter

- (13:03) FRES – Adam Montano 22-yard field goal (Drive: 5 plays, 22 yards, 1:51; Fresno State 24–21)
- (7:41) ORE– Camden Lewis 25-yard field goal (Drive: 7 plays, 25 yards, 2:35; Tied 24–24)
- (2:57) ORE– Anthony Brown 30-yard run, Camden Lewis kick (Drive: 6 plays, 63 yards, 3:04; Oregon 31–24)

Statistics	FRES	ORE
First downs	23	20
Plays–yards	76–375	70–364
Rushes–yards	30–77	49–192
Passing yards	298	172
Passing: comp–att–int	30–43–0	15–24–0
Time of possession	30:33	29:27

Team	Category	Player	Statistics
Fresno State	Passing	Jake Haener	30/43, 298 yards, TD
Fresno State	Rushing	Jordan Mims	4 carries, 47 yards
Fresno State	Receiving	Josh Kelly	6 receptions, 84 yards
Oregon	Passing	Anthony Brown	15/24, 172 yards, TD
Oregon	Rushing	C. J. Verdell	18 carries, 74 yards, TD
Oregon	Receiving	Johnny Johnson III	3 receptions, 76 yards, TD

=== At No. 3 Ohio State ===
First win against Ohio State (0–9 previously).

No. 12 Oregon Ducks at No. 3 Ohio State Buckeyes – Game summary

Quarter	1	2	3	4	Total
No. 12 Ducks	0	14	14	7	35
No. 3 Buckeyes	0	7	7	14	28

at Ohio Stadium • Columbus, OH

- Date: September 11, 2021
- Game time: 9:00 A.M PDT
- Game attendance: 100,482
- Referee: Steven Strimling
- TV announcers (FOX): Gus Johnson (Play-by-play), Joel Klatt (Analyst), Jenny Taft (Sideline)

Game information

First quarter

- None

Second quarter

- (14:27) ORE – C. J. Verdell 14-yard run, Camden Lewis kick (Drive: 10 plays, 99 yards, 3:57; Oregon 7–0)
- (8:42) OSU – Garrett Wilson 27-yard pass from C. J. Stroud, Noah Ruggles kick (Drive: 5 plays, 70 yards, 1:47; Tied 7–7)
- (4:51) ORE – C. J. Verdell 14-yard pass from Anthony Brown, Camden Lewis kick (Drive: 7 plays, 65 yards, 3:51; Oregon 14–7)

Third quarter

- (13:38) ORE – C. J. Verdell 77-yard run, Camden Lewis kick (Drive: 3 plays, 84 yards, 1:22; Oregon 21–7)
- (10:25) OSU – Jaxon Smith-Njigba 26-yard pass from C. J. Stroud, Noah Ruggles kick (Drive: 7 plays, 75 yards, 3:13; Oregon 21–14)
- (7:38) ORE – Travis Dye 5-yard run, Camden Lewis kick (Drive: 7 plays, 75 yards, 2:47; Oregon 28–14)

Fourth quarter

- (12:54) OSU – TreVeyon Henderson 2-yard run, Noah Ruggles kick (Drive: 8 plays, 73 yards, 2:08; Oregon 28–21)
- (10:10) ORE – Moliki Matavao 14-yard pass from Anthony Brown, Camden Lewis kick (Drive: 6 plays, 74 yards, 2:44; Oregon 35–21)
- (7:55) OSU – Jaxon Smith-Njigba 15-yard pass from C. J. Stroud, Noah Ruggles kick (Drive: 8 plays, 75 yards, 2:15; Oregon 35–28)

Statistics	ORE	OSU
First downs	27	32
Plays–yards	73–505	85–612
Rushes–yards	38–269	31–128
Passing yards	236	484
Passing: comp–att–int	17–35–1	35–54–1
Time of possession	29:46	30:14

Team	Category	Player	Statistics
Oregon	Passing	Anthony Brown	17/35, 236 yards, 2 TD
Oregon	Rushing	C. J. Verdell	20 carries, 161 yards, 2 TD
Oregon	Receiving	C. J. Verdell	3 receptions, 34 yards, TD
Ohio State	Passing	C. J. Stroud	35/54, 484 yards, 3 TD, INT
Ohio State	Rushing	Miyan Williams	14 carries, 77 yards
Ohio State	Receiving	Jaxon Smith-Njigba	7 receptions, 145 yards, 2 TD

=== vs Stony Brook ===
Stony Brook Seawolves at No. 4 Oregon Ducks – Game summary

Quarter	1	2	3	4	Total
Seawolves	7	0	0	0	7
No. 4 Ducks	10	7	14	17	48

at Autzen Stadium • Eugene, OR

- Date: September 18, 2021
- Game time: 4:30 p.m. PDT
- Game attendance: –
- Referee: Justin Elliot
- TV announcers (P12N): Guy Haberman (play-by-play), Shane Vereen (analyst)

Game information

First quarter

- (12:23) ORE – Camden Lewis 40-yard field goal (Drive: 6 plays, 24 yards, 1:57; Oregon 3–0)
- (5:18) ORE – CJ Verdell 9-yard pass from Anthony Brown, Camden Lewis kick (Drive: 10 plays, 86 yards, 3:44; Oregon 10–0)
- (0:00) SBU – Ty Son Lawton 5-yard run, Angelo Guglielmello kick (Drive: 11 plays, 75 yards, 5:18; Oregon 10–7)

Second quarter

- (12:03) ORE – Anthony Brown 7-yard run, Camden Lewis kick (Drive: 7 plays, 73 yards, 2:57; Oregon 17–7)

Third quarter

- (7:45) ORE – Terrance Ferguson 1-yard pass from Ty Thompson, Camden Lewis kick (Drive: 10 plays, 48 yards, 4:05; Oregon 24–7)
- (1:38) ORE – Travis Dye 3-yard run, Camden Lewis kick (Drive: 3 plays, 11 yards, 1:15; Oregon 31–7)

Fourth quarter

- (13:08) ORE – Camden Lewis 40-yard field goal (Drive: 4 plays, 15 yards, 1:39; Oregon 34–7)
- (8:26) ORE – Dont'e Thornton 54-yard pass from Ty Thompson, Camden Lewis kick (Drive: 1 play, 54 yards, 0:11; Oregon 41–7)
- (2:42) ORE – Trey Benson 3-yard Run, Camden Lewis kick (Drive: 10 plays, 65 yards, 4:13; Oregon 48–7)

Statistics	SBU	ORE
First downs	14	26
Plays–yards	62–271	69–436
Rushes–yards	39–140	39–173
Passing yards	131	263
Passing: comp–att–int	10–23–3	22–50–0
Time of possession	31:01	28:59

Team	Category	Player	Statistics
Stony Brook	Passing	Tyquell Fields	10/23, 131 yards, 3 INT
Stony Brook	Rushing	Ty Son Lawton	15 carries, 53 yards, TD
Stony Brook	Receiving	Shawn Harris Jr.	3 receptions, 67 yards
Oregon	Passing	Anthony Brown	14/18, 159 yards, TD
Oregon	Rushing	Travis Dye	15 carries, 87 yards, TD
Oregon	Receiving	Dont'e Thornton	2 receptions, 60 yards, TD

=== vs Arizona ===
Arizona Wildcats at No. 3 Oregon Ducks – Game summary

Quarter	1	2	3	4	Total
Wildcats	7	3	9	0	19
No. 3 Ducks	17	7	0	17	41

at Autzen Stadium • Eugene, OR

- Date: September 25, 2021
- Game time: 7:30 p.m. PDT
- Game weather: 66 °F (19 °C); Wind: NW 8 MPH
- Game attendance: –
- Referee: Francisco Villar
- TV announcers (ESPN): Dave Flemming (play by play), Rod Gilmore (analyst:), Stormy Buonantony (sideline)

Game information

First quarter

- (13:58) ORE – Jaylon Redd 63-yard pass from Anthony Brown, Camden Lewis kick (Drive: 3 plays, 75 yards, 1:02; Oregon 7–0)
- (10:51) ORE – Camden Lewis 21-yard field goal (Drive: 7 plays, 22 yards, 2:56; Oregon 10–0)
- (6:15) UA – Bryce Wolma 11-yard pass from Jordan McCloud, Lucas Havrisik kick (Drive: 10 plays, 91 yards, 4:36; Oregon 10–7)
- (4:16) ORE – CJ Verdell 11-yard run, Camden Lewis kick (Drive: 5 plays, 75 yards, 1:59; Oregon 17–7)

Second quarter

- (9:59) ORE – Terrance Ferguson 9-yard pass from Anthony Brown, Camden Lewis kick (Drive: 8 plays, 80 yards, 3:41; Oregon 24–7)
- (4:24) UA – Lucas Havrisik 28-yard field goal (Drive: 12 plays, 70 yards, 5:35; Oregon 24–10)

Third quarter

- (7:11) UA – Mo Diallo tackles Anthony Brown in end zone for a safety (Oregon 24–12)
- (1:36) UA – Drake Anderson 1-yard run, Lucas Havrisik kick (Drive: 12 plays, 71 yards, 5:35; Oregon 24–19)

Fourth quarter

- (13:37) ORE – Camden Lewis 43-yard field goal (Drive: 9 plays, 50 yards, 2:59; Oregon 27–19)
- (8:26) ORE – Spencer Webb 18-yard pass from Anthony Brown, Camden Lewis kick (Drive: 7 plays, 59 yards, 4:00; Oregon 34–19)
- (7:04) ORE – Bennett Williams 68-yard interception return, Camden Lewis kick (Oregon 41–19)

Statistics	UA	ORE
First downs	31	17
Plays–yards	88–435	55–393
Rushes–yards	53–202	31–187
Passing yards	233	206
Passing: comp–att–int	21–35–5	10–24–0
Time of possession	37:58	22:02

Team	Category	Player	Statistics
Arizona	Passing	Jordan McCloud	21/35, 233 yards, TD, 5 INT
Arizona	Rushing	Drake Anderson	21 carries, 67 yards, TD
Arizona	Receiving	Stanley Berryhill	5 receptions, 75 yards
Oregon	Passing	Anthony Brown	10/21, 206 yards, 3 TD
Oregon	Rushing	Travis Dye	5 carries, 92 yards
Oregon	Receiving	Jaylon Redd	1 reception, 63 yards, TD

=== At Stanford ===
No. 3 Oregon Ducks at Stanford Cardinal – Game summary

Quarter	1	2	3	4	OT	Total
No. 3 Ducks	0	7	10	7	0	24
Cardinal	10	7	0	7	7	31

at Stanford Stadium • Stanford, CA

- Date: October 2, 2021
- Game time: 12:30 p.m. PDT
- Game weather: 82 °F (28 °C); Sunny
- Game attendance: 31,610
- Referee: Matthew Richards
- TV announcers (ABC): Dave Flemming (play-by-play), Rod Gilmore (analyst), Stormy Buonantony (sideline)
- Reference

Game information

First quarter

- STAN – Joshua Karty 25-yard field goal, 10:30. Stanford 3–0. Drive: 11 plays, 50 yards, 4:30.
- STAN – Brycen Tremayne 18-yard pass from Tanner McKee (Joshua Karty kick), 6:25. Stanford 10–0. Drive: 2 plays, 43 yards, 0:40.

Second quarter

- ORE – Anthony Brown 3-yard run (Camden Lewis kick), 14:34. Stanford 10–7. Drive: 8 plays, 55 yards, 2:31.
- STAN – Isaiah Sanders 2-yard run (Joshua Karty kick), 8:02. Stanford 17–7. Drive: 12 plays, 75 yards, 6:32.

Third quarter

- ORE – C. J. Verdell 1-yard run (Camden Lewis kick), 8:32. Stanford 17–14. Drive: 8 plays, 48 yards, 3:48.
- ORE – Camden Lewis 22-yard field goal, 0:53. Tied 17–17. Drive: 12 plays, 34 yards, 6:16.

Fourth quarter

- ORE – Anthony Brown 5-yard run (Camden Lewis kick), 9:32. Oregon 24–17. Drive: 5 plays, 80 yards, 2:11.
- STAN – Elijah Higgins 2-yard pass from Tanner McKee (Joshua Karty kick), 0:00. Tied 24–24. Drive: 11 plays, 86 yards, 0:00.

First Overtime

- STAN – John Humphreys 14-yard pass from Tanner McKee (Joshua Karty kick). Stanford 31–24. Drive: 6 plays, 25 yards.

Statistics	ORE	STAN
First downs	21	23
Plays–yards	79–414	71–354
Rushes–yards	53–228	35–124
Passing yards	186	230
Passing: comp–att–int	14–26–1	20–36–0
Time of possession	30:29	29:31

Team	Category	Player	Statistics
Oregon	Passing	Anthony Brown	14/26, 186 yards, INT
Oregon	Rushing	Travis Dye	19 carries, 96 yards
Oregon	Receiving	Mycah Pittman	1 reception, 66 yards
Stanford	Passing	Tanner McKee	20/36, 230 yards, 3 TD
Stanford	Rushing	Nathaniel Peat	15 carries, 78 yards
Stanford	Receiving	Elijah Higgins	6 receptions, 62 yards, TD

=== vs California ===
California Golden Bears at No. 9 Oregon Ducks – Game summary

Quarter	1	2	3	4	Total
Golden Bears	7	0	3	7	17
No. 9 Ducks	3	7	0	14	24

at Autzen Stadium • Eugene, OR

- Date: October 15, 2021
- Game time: 7:30 p.m. PDT
- Game weather: 61 °F (16 °C); Overcast; Clear
- Game attendance: 50,008
- Referee: Steven Strimling
- TV announcers (ESPN): Beth Mowins (play by play), Kirk Morrison (analyst), Dawn Davenport (sideline)

Game information

First quarter

- (10:42) ORE – Camden Lewis 49-yard field goal (Drive: 7 plays, 39 yards, 4:18; Oregon 3–0)
- (5:23) CAL – Jake Tonges 9-yard pass from Chase Garbers, Dario Longhetto kick (Drive: 13 plays, 75 yards, 5:19; California 7–3)

Second quarter

- (5:17) ORE – Travis Dye 11-yard run, Camden Lewis kick (Drive: 7 plays, 67 yards, 2:52; Oregon 10–7)

Third quarter

- (8:34) CAL – Dario Longhetto 45-yard field goal (Drive: 8 plays, 52 yards, 3:02; Tied 10–10)

Fourth quarter

- (13:37) CAL – Gavin Reinwald 4-yard pass from Chase Garbers, Dario Longhetto kick (Drive: 11 plays, 80 yards, 5:46; California 17–10)
- (11:23) ORE – Jaylon Redd 20-yard pass from Anthony Brown, Camden Lewis kick (Drive: 5 plays, 62 yards, 2:14; Tied 17–17)
- (4:50) ORE – Anthony Brown 11-yard run, Camden Lewis kick (Drive: 7 plays, 70 yards, 4:00; Oregon 24–17)

Statistics	CAL	ORE
First downs	23	23
Plays–yards	81–402	63–454
Rushes–yards	36–155	35–210
Passing yards	247	244
Passing: comp–att–int	25–45–0	20–28–0
Time of possession	32:10	27:50

Team	Category	Player	Statistics
California	Passing	Chase Garbers	25/44, 247 yards, 2 TD
California	Rushing	Christopher Brooks	14 carries, 68 yards
California	Receiving	Jeremiah Hunter	3 receptions, 78 yards
Oregon	Passing	Anthony Brown	20/28, 244 yards, TD
Oregon	Rushing	Travis Dye	19 carries, 145 yards, TD
Oregon	Receiving	Travis Dye	7 receptions, 73 yards

=== At UCLA ===
No. 10 Oregon Ducks at UCLA Bruins – Game summary

Quarter	1	2	3	4	Total
No. 10 Ducks	0	14	13	7	34
Bruins	14	3	0	14	31

at Rose Bowl • Pasadena, CA

- Date: October 23, 2021
- Game time: 12:30 p.m. PDT
- Game weather: 64 °F (18 °C); cloudy; Wind: 6 mph NorthWest
- Game attendance: 55,675
- Referee: Mark Duddy
- TV announcers (ABC): Chris Fowler, Kirk Herbstreit, Holly Rowe

Game information

First quarter

- (9:45) UCLA – Brittain Brown 2-yard run, Nicholas Barr-Mira kick (Drive: 12 plays, 75 yards, 5:15; UCLA 7–0)
- (4:08) UCLA – Kazmeir Allen 5-yard pass from Dorian Thompson-Robinson, Nicholas Barr-Mira kick (Drive: 4 plays, 30 yards, 0:59; UCLA 14–0)

Second quarter

- (13:46) ORE – Travis Dye 1-yard run, Camden Lewis kick (Drive: 12 plays, 37 yards, 5:22; UCLA 14–7)
- (2:49) ORE – Travis Dye 4-yard run, Camden Lewis kick (Drive: 12 plays, 80 yards, 5:17; Tied 14–14)
- (0:00) UCLA – Nicholas Barr-Mira 37-yard field goal (Drive: 1 play, -8 yards, 0:02; UCLA 17–14)

Third quarter

- (12:00) ORE – Travis Dye 1-yard run, Camden Lewis kick (Drive: 6 plays, 75 yards, 3:00; Oregon 21–17)
- (8:52) ORE – Travis Dye 5-yard run, Camden Lewis kick no good (Drive: 4 plays, 22 yards, 2:14; Oregon 27–17)

Fourth quarter

- (13:53) ORE – Anthony Brown 43-yard run, Camden Lewis kick (Drive: 3 plays, 62 yards, 0:59; Oregon 34–17)
- (10:35) UCLA – Dorian Thompson-Robinson 2-yard run, Nicholas Barr-Mira kick (Drive: 12 plays, 73 yards, 3:18; Oregon 34–24)
- (6:34) UCLA – Brittain Brown 1-yard run, Nicholas Barr-Mira kick (Drive: 7 plays, 20 yards, 2:53; Oregon 34–31)

Statistics	ORE	UCLA
First downs	22	28
Plays–yards	63–417	91–352
Rushes–yards	24–121	45–110
Passing yards	296	242
Passing: comp–att–int	29–39–2	24–46–2
Time of possession	28:43	31:17

Team	Category	Player	Statistics
Oregon	Passing	Anthony Brown	26/39, 296 yards, 2 INT
Oregon	Rushing	Anthony Brown	6 carries, 85 yards, TD
Oregon	Receiving	Devon Williams	5 receptions, 80 yards
UCLA	Passing	Dorian Thompson-Robinson	22/41, 220 yards, TD, INT
UCLA	Rushing	Brittain Brown	13 carries, 45 yards, 2 TD
UCLA	Receiving	Kyle Philips	8 receptions, 73 yards

=== vs Colorado ===
Colorado Buffaloes at No. 7 Oregon Ducks – Game summary

Quarter	1	2	3	4	Total
Buffaloes	0	14	0	15	29
No. 7 Ducks	14	17	14	7	52

at Autzen Stadium • Eugene, OR

- Date: October 30, 2021
- Game time: 12:30 p.m. PDT
- Game attendance: 51,449
- Referee: Francisco Villar
- TV announcers (FOX): Aaron Goldsmith (play-by-play), Brock Huard (analyst)

Game information

First quarter

- (10:47) ORE – Travis Dye 10-yard pass from Anthony Brown, Camden Lewis kick (Drive: 7 plays, 67 yards, 4:13; Oregon 7–0)
- (7:04) ORE – Byron Cardwell 34-yard run, Camden Lewis kick (Drive: 5 plays, 78 yards, 2:11; Oregon 14–0)

Second quarter

- (13:38) ORE – Troy Franklin 28-yard pass from Anthony Brown, Camden Lewis kick (Drive: 10 plays, 90 yards, 4:52; Oregon 21–0)
- (9:10) COL – Ty Robinson 9-yard pass from Brendon Lewis, Cole Becker kick (Drive: 9 plays, 77 yards, 4:22; Oregon 21–7)
- (4:28) ORE – Travis Dye 5-yard run, Camden Lewis kick (Drive: 10 plays, 73 yards, 4:33; Oregon 28–7)
- (2:13) COL – Alex Fontenot 2-yard pass from Brendon Lewis, Cole Becker kick (Drive: 8 plays, 65 yards, 2:15; Oregon 28–14)
- (0:00) ORE – Camden Lewis 27-yard field goal (Drive: 14 plays, 66 yards, 2:06; Oregon 31–14)

Third quarter

- (9:46) ORE – Travis Dye 2-yard run, Camden Lewis kick (Drive: 6 plays, 68 yards, 3:08; Oregon 38–14)
- (5:21) ORE – Devon Williams 25-yard pass from Anthony Brown, Camden Lewis kick (Drive: 6 plays, 81 yards, 1:56; Oregon 45–14)

Fourth quarter

- (13:36) COL – Alex Fontenot 1-yard run, Cole Becker kick (Drive: 17 plays, 67 yards, 6:34; Oregon 45–21)
- (6:04) COL – Brenden Rice 16-yard pass from Brendon Lewis, Chase Penry-Brendon Lewis 2-point pass (Drive: 9 plays, 65 yards, 4:25; Oregon 45–29)
- (0:50) ORE – Seven McGee 1-yard run, Camden Lewis kick (Drive: 8 plays, 46 yards, 5:13; Oregon 52–29)

Statistics	COL	ORE
First downs	19	32
Plays–yards	63–341	72–568
Rushes–yards	30–117	36–256
Passing yards	224	312
Passing: comp–att–int	25–33–0	26–36–1
Time of possession	28:24	31:36

Team	Category	Player	Statistics
Colorado	Passing	Brendon Lewis	25/33, 224 yards, 3 TD
Colorado	Rushing	Alex Fontenot	8 carries, 42 yards, TD
Colorado	Receiving	Brenden Rice	5 receptions, 102 yards, TD
Oregon	Passing	Anthony Brown	25/31, 307 yards, 3 TD
Oregon	Rushing	Byron Cardwell	7 carries, 127 yards, TD
Oregon	Receiving	Devon Williams	5 receptions, 95 yards, TD

=== At Washington ===
No. 4 Oregon Ducks at Washington Huskies – Game summary

Quarter	1	2	3	4	Total
No. 4 Ducks	3	7	7	9	26
Huskies	9	0	0	7	16

at Husky Stadium • Seattle, WA

- Date: November 6, 2021
- Game time: 4:30 p.m. PDT
- Game weather: 46 °F (8 °C); Rain
- Game attendance: 63,193
- Referee: Michael Mothershed
- TV announcers (ABC): Mark Jones, Robert Griffin III, Quint Kessenich

Game information

First quarter

- (12:14) WASH – Sean McGrew 1-yard run, Peyton Henry kick (Drive: 2 plays, 6 yards, 0:42; Washington 7–0)
- (8:40) ORE – Camden Lewis 46-yard field goal (Drive: 7 plays, 47 yards, 3:34; Washington 7–3)
- (7:01) WASH – Jackson Sirmon safety (Drive: 1 plays, -1 yard, 0:11; Washington 9–3)

Second quarter

- (5:08) ORE – Devon Williams 31-yard pass from Anthony Brown, Camden Lewis kick (Drive: 7 plays, 76 yards, 3:09; Oregon 10–9)

Third quarter

- (9:38) ORE – Anthony Brown 2-yard run, Camden Lewis kick (Drive: 6 plays, 70 yards, 3:14; Oregon 17–9)

Fourth quarter

- (14:53) ORE – Travis Dye 19-yard run, Camden Lewis kick (Drive: 2 plays, 22 yards, 0:35; Oregon 24–9)
- (11:13) WASH – Sean McGrew 2-yard run, Peyton Henry kick (Drive: 11 plays, 75 yards, 3:40; Oregon 24–16)
- (1:57) ORE – Team safety (Drive: 4 plays, -10 yards, 0:17; Oregon 26–16)

Statistics	ORE	WASH
First downs	22	7
Plays–yards	76–427	51–166
Rushes–yards	56–329	24–55
Passing yards	98	111
Passing: comp–att–int	10–20–1	15–17–1
Time of possession	36:33	23:27

Team	Category	Player	Statistics
Oregon	Passing	Anthony Brown	10/20, 98 yards, TD, INT
Oregon	Rushing	Travis Dye	28 carries, 211 yards, TD
Oregon	Receiving	Devon Williams	2 receptions, 32 yards, TD
Washington	Passing	Dylan Morris	15/27, 111 yards, INT
Washington	Rushing	Sean McGrew	15 carries, 48 yards, 2 TD
Washington	Receiving	Cade Otton	4 receptions, 30 yards

=== vs Washington State ===
Washington State Cougars at No. 3 Oregon Ducks – Game summary

Quarter	1	2	3	4	Total
Cougars	0	14	0	3	17
No. 3 Ducks	14	0	10	14	38

at Autzen Stadium • Eugene, OR

- Date: November 13, 2021
- Game time: 7:40 p.m. PST
- Game weather: 57,858 °F (32,126 °C); Sunny;
- Game attendance: 52,327
- Referee: Mark Duddy
- TV announcers (ESPN): Dave Flemming, Rod Gilmore, Stormy Buonantony

Game information

First quarter

- (3:51) ORE – Travis Dye 1-yard run, Camden Lewis kick (Drive: 11 plays, 75 yards, 5:45; Oregon 7–0)
- (2:04) ORE – Travis Dye 11-yard pass from Anthony Brown, Camden Lewis kick (Drive: 4 plays, 40 yards, 1:40; Oregon 14–0)

Second quarter

- (6:52) WSU – De'Zhaun Stribling 14-yard pass from Jayden de Laura, Dean Janikowski kick (Drive: 6 plays, 46 yards, 2:16; Oregon 14–7)
- (0:11) WSU – Jayden de Laura 1-yard run, Dean Janikowski kick (Drive: 12 plays, 73 yards, 4:38; Oregon 14–14)

Third quarter

- (12:52) ORE – Anthony Brown 17-yard run, Camden Lewis kick (Drive: 5 plays, 43 yards, 2:08; Oregon 21–14)
- (2:54) ORE – Camden Lewis 22-yard field goal (Drive: 13 plays, 91 yards, 7:03; Oregon 24–14)

Fourth quarter

- (8:31) WSU – Dean Janikowski 34-yard field goal (Drive: 5 plays, 33 yards, 1:57; Oregon 24–17)
- (5:52) ORE – Byron Cardwell 27-yard run, Camden Lewis kick (Drive: 5 plays, 66 yards, 2:39; Oregon 31–17)
- (2:07) ORE – Byron Cardwell 22-yard run, Camden Lewis kick (Drive: 4 plays, 32 yards, 1:46; Oregon 38–17)
- (0:09) WSU – Travell Harris 2-yard pass from Jayden de Laura, Dean Janikowski kick (Drive: 6 plays, 61 yards, 1:58; Oregon 38–24)

Statistics	WSU	ORE
First downs	20	25
Plays–yards	61–371	69–441
Rushes–yards	25–91	47–306
Passing yards	280	135
Passing: comp–att–int	20–36–2	17–22–0
Time of possession	24:39	35:21

Team	Category	Player	Statistics
Washington St.	Passing	Jayden de Laura	20/36, 280 yards, 2 TD, 2 INT
Washington St.	Rushing	Deon McIntosh	9 carries, 57 yards
Washington St.	Receiving	Travell Harris	8 receptions, 109 yards, TD
Oregon	Passing	Anthony Brown	17/22, 135 yards, TD
Oregon	Rushing	Anthony Brown	17 carries, 123 yards, TD
Oregon	Receiving	Johnny Johnson III	3 receptions, 43 yards

=== At No. 23 Utah ===
No. 3 Oregon Ducks at No. 23 Utah Utes – Game summary

Quarter	1	2	3	4	Total
No. 3 Ducks	0	0	7	0	7
No. 23 Utes	7	21	7	3	38

at Rice-Eccles Stadium • Salt Lake City, UT

- Date: November 20, 2021
- Game time: 4:30 p.m. PST
- Game attendance: 52,724
- Referee: Mike McCabe
- TV announcers (ABC): Sean McDonough, Todd Blackledge, Molly McGrath

Game information

First quarter

- (4:40) UTAH – Tavion Thomas 10-yard run, Jadon Redding kick (Drive: 13 plays, 63 yards, 6:22; Utah 7–0)

Second quarter

- (5:08) UTAH – Cameron Rising 1-yard run, Jadon Redding kick (Drive: 9 plays, 80 yards, 4:19; Utah 14–0)
- (0:27) UTAH – Tavion Thomas 4-yard run, Jadon Redding kick (Drive: 6 plays, 77 yards, 1:35; Utah 21–0)
- (0:00) UTAH – Britain Covey 78-yard punt return, Jadon Redding kick (Drive: 3 plays, 7 yards, 0:27; Utah 28–0)

Third quarter

- (10:02) ORE – Devon Williams 36-yard pass from Anthony Brown, Camden Lewis kick (Drive: 9 plays, 75 yards, 4:58; Utah 28–7)
- (3:56) UTAH – Tavion Thomas 5-yard run, Jadon Redding kick (Drive: 11 plays, 75 yards, 6:06; Utah 35–7)

Fourth quarter

- (7:32) UTAH – Jadon Redding 26-yard field goal (Drive: 12 plays, 56 yards, 7:19; Utah 38–7)

Statistics	ORE	UTAH
First downs	18	24
Plays–yards	58–294	71–354
Rushes–yards	23–63	68–386
Passing yards	231	178
Passing: comp–att–int	17–35–0	10–18–0
Time of possession	24:33	35:27

Team	Category	Player	Statistics
Oregon	Passing	Anthony Brown	17/35, 231 yards, TD
Oregon	Rushing	Byron Cardwell	17 carries, 35 yards
Oregon	Receiving	Kris Hutson	4 receptions, 96 yards
Utah	Passing	Cameron Rising	10/18, 178 yards
Utah	Rushing	Tavion Thomas	21 carries, 94 yards, 3 TD
Utah	Receiving	Brant Kuithe	5 receptions, 118 yards

=== vs Oregon State ===
Oregon State Beavers at No. 11 Oregon Ducks – Game summary

Quarter	1	2	3	4	Total
Beavers	3	0	6	20	29
No. 11 Ducks	14	10	0	14	38

at Autzen Stadium • Eugene, OR

- Date: November 27, 2021
- Game time: 12:35 p.m.
- Game weather: 56 °F (13 °C); Cloudy;
- Game attendance: 56,408
- Referee: Chris Coyle
- TV announcers (ESPN): Dave Pasch, Dusty Dvoracek, Tom Luginbill

Game information

First quarter

- (10:53) ORE – Travis Dye 20-yard run, Camden Lewis kick (Drive: 9 plays, 75 yards, 4:07; Oregon 7–0)
- (4:07) ORE – Devon Williams 50-yard pass from Anthony Brown, Camden Lewis kick (Drive: 7 plays, 96 yards, 3:39; Oregon 14–0)
- (0:24) OSU – Everett Hayes 38-yard field goal (Drive: 9 plays, 55 yards, 3:43; Oregon 14–3)

Second quarter

- (8:06) ORE – Camden Lewis 36-yard field goal (Drive: 14 plays, 61 yards, 7:18; Oregon 17–3)
- (0:35) ORE – Anthony Brown 10-yard run, Camden Lewis kick (Drive: 13 plays, 70 yards, 5:12; Oregon 24–3)

Third quarter

- (10:33) OSU – Luke Musgrave 4-yard pass from Chance Nolan (Drive: 9 plays, 64 yards, 4:27; Oregon 24–9)

Fourth quarter

- (12:00) ORE – Kris Hutson 7-yard pass from Anthony Brown, Camden Lewis kick (Drive: 10 plays, 85 yards, 6:03; Oregon 31–10)
- (9:57) OSU – B. J. Baylor 4-yard run, 2-point pass failed (Drive: 4 plays, 75 yards, 2:03; Oregon 31–15)
- (8:28) OSU – Trevon Bradford 15-yard pass from Chance Nolan, 2-point pass failed (Drive: 6 plays, 48 yards, 1:29; Oregon 31–21)
- (3:14) ORE – Travis Dye 1-yard run, Camden Lewis kick (Drive: 9 plays, 75 yards, 5:14; Oregon 38–21)
- (1:08) OSU – Chance Nolan 1-yard run, Zeriah Beason-Chance Nolan 2-point pass (Drive: 12 plays, 75 yards, 2:08; Oregon 38–29)

Statistics	OSU	ORE
First downs	22	26
Plays–yards	60–393	69–506
Rushes–yards	21–85	41–231
Passing yards	308	275
Passing: comp–att–int	25–39–1	23–28–0
Time of possession	22:56	37:04

Team	Category	Player	Statistics
Oregon State	Passing	Chance Nolan	25/39, 308 yards, 2 TD, INT
Oregon State	Rushing	B. J. Baylor	13 carries, 59 yards, TD
Oregon State	Receiving	Luke Musgrave	7 receptions, 85 yards, TD
Oregon	Passing	Anthony Brown	23/28, 275 yards, 2 TD
Oregon	Rushing	Travis Dye	20 carries, 99 yards, 2 TD
Oregon	Receiving	Devon Williams	6 receptions, 110 yards, TD

=== vs No. 17 Utah (Pac-12 Championship Game) ===
No. 10 Oregon Ducks vs. No. 17 Utah Utes – Game summary

Quarter	1	2	3	4	Total
No. 10 Ducks	0	0	3	7	10
No. 17 Utes	14	9	8	7	38

at Allegiant Stadium • Las Vegas, NV

- Date: December 3, 2021
- Game time: 5:00 p.m.
- Game weather: n/a (game played indoors)
- Game attendance: 56,511
- Referee: Steven Strimling
- TV announcers (ABC): Chris Fowler, Kirk Herbstreit, Holly Rowe

Game information

First quarter

- (10:47) UTAH – Tavion Thomas 2-yard run, Jadon Redding kick (Drive: 9 plays, 61 yards, 4:13; Utah 7–0)
- (4:16) UTAH – Devin Lloyd 34-yard interception return, Jadon Redding kick (Drive: 4 plays, 15 yards, 1:16; Utah 14–0)

Second quarter

- (0:27) UTAH – Dalton Kincaid 11-yard pass from Cam Rising, Jadon Redding kick (Drive: 12 plays, 74 yards, 3:37; Utah 21–0)
- (0:00) UTAH – Jadon Redding 50-yard field goal (Drive: 2 plays, 5 yards, 0:08; Utah 24–0)

Third quarter

- (10:32) ORE – Camden Lewis 42-yard field goal (Drive: 9 plays, 51 yards, 4:28; Utah 24–3)
- (6:33) UTAH – T. J. Pledger 4-yard run, Jadon Redding kick (Drive: 3 plays, 45 yards, 0:26; Utah 31–3)

Fourth quarter

- (10:21) UTAH – Tavion Thomas 3-yard run, Jadon Redding kick (Drive: 11 plays, 62 yards, 6:32; Utah 38–3)
- (5:17) ORE – Travis Dye 2-yard run, Camden Lewis kick (Drive: 12 plays, 90 yards, 5:04; Utah 38–10)

Statistics	ORE	UTAH
First downs	13	20
Plays–yards	53–221	64–361
Rushes–yards	29–74	40–191
Passing yards	147	170
Passing: comp–att–int	13–24–2	15–24–2
Time of possession	27:56	32:04

Team	Category	Player	Statistics
Oregon	Passing	Anthony Brown	13/24, 147 yards, 2 INT
Oregon	Rushing	Travis Dye	15 carries, 82 yards, TD
Oregon	Receiving	Isaah Crocker	3 receptions, 51 yards
Utah	Passing	Cameron Rising	15/24, 170 yards, TD, 2 INT
Utah	Rushing	Tavion Thomas	18 carries, 63 yards, 2 TD
Utah	Receiving	Britain Covey	5 receptions, 72 yards

=== vs No. 16 Oklahoma (2021 Alamo Bowl) ===
No. 14 Oregon Ducks vs. No. 16 Oklahoma Sooners – Game summary

Quarter	1	2	3	4	Total
No. 14 Ducks	3	0	22	7	32
No. 16 Sooners	6	24	14	3	47

at Alamodome • San Antonio, Texas

- Date: Wednesday, December 29, 2021
- Game time: 9:15 p.m. EST (8:15 p.m. local CST)
- Game weather: Indoor
- Game attendance: 59,121
- Referee: Mike Roche
- TV announcers (ESPN): Jason Benetti (play-by-play), Andre Ware (analyst) and Paul Carcaterra (sideline)
- Box score

Game information

First quarter

- 7:56 OKLA – Kennedy Brooks 16-yard rush, Gabe Brkic kick wide. Drive: 9 plays, 54 yards, 4:31. Oklahoma 6–0
- 1:57 ORE – Camden Lewis 24-yard field goal. Drive: 14 plays, 66 yards, 5:59. Oklahoma 6–3

Second quarter

- 13:15 OKLA – Gabe Brkic 40-yard field goal. Drive: 11 plays, 52 yards, 3:42. Oklahoma 9–3
- 10:29 OKLA – Drake Stoops 6-yard pass from Caleb Williams, Gabe Brkic kick good. Drive: 4 plays, 48 yards, 1:50. Oklahoma 16–3
- 4:00 OKLA – Marvin Mims 55-yard pass from Caleb Williams, Gabe Brkic kick good. Drive: 7 plays, 89 yards, 2:20. Oklahoma 23–3
- 0:36 OKLA – Kennedy Brooks 29-yard rush, Gabe Brkic kick good. Drive: 6 plays, 64 yards, 1:17. Oklahoma 30–3

Third quarter

- 11:35 ORE – Travis Dye 11-yard rush, Kris Hutson conversion rush good. Drive: 9 plays, 81 yards, 3:25. Oklahoma 30–11
- 8:38 OKLA – Eric Gray 6-yard pass from Caleb Williams, Gabe Brkic kick good. Drive: 6 plays, 76 yards, 2:57. Oklahoma 37–11
- 7:08 ORE – Dont'e Thornton 66-yard pass from Anthony Brown, Camden Lewis kick good. Drive: 4 plays, 80 yards, 1:30. Oklahoma 37–18
- 4:55 OKLA – Kennedy Brooks 8-yard run, Gabe Brkic kick good. Drive: 5 plays, 75 yards, 2:13. Oklahoma 44–18
- 0:56 ORE – Kris Hutson 34-yard pass from Anthony Brown, Camden Lewis kick good. Drive: 11 plays, 76 yards, 3:59. Oklahoma 44–25

Fourth quarter

- 8:56 OKLA – Gabe Brkic 29-yard field goal. Drive: 12 plays, 53 yards, 7:00. Oklahoma 47–25
- 6:46 ORE – Troy Franklin 30-yard pass from Anthony Brown, Camden Lewis kick good. Drive: 6 plays, 75 yards, 2:10. Oklahoma 47–32

=== Statistics ===
Statistics	ORE	OKLA
First downs	26	27
Plays–yards	73–497	70–564
Rushes–yards	33–191	43–322
Passing yards	306	242
Passing: comp–att–int	27–40–1	21–27–0
Time of possession	26:26	33:34

Team	Category	Player	Statistics
Oregon	Passing	Anthony Brown	27/40, 306 yards, 3 TD, INT
Oregon	Rushing	Travis Dye	18 carries, 153 yards, TD
Oregon	Receiving	Dont'e Thornton	4 receptions, 90 yards, TD
Oklahoma	Passing	Caleb Williams	21/27, 242 yards, 3 TD
Oklahoma	Rushing	Kennedy Brooks	14 carries, 142 yards, 3 TD
Oklahoma	Receiving	Jalil Farooq	3 receptions, 64 yards
