= 2015 Georgia Bulldogs football team =

American college football season

2015 Georgia Bulldogs football

TaxSlayer Bowl champion

TaxSlayer Bowl, W 24–17 vs. Penn State
- Conference: Southeastern Conference
- Eastern Division

Ranking
- Coaches: No. 24
- Record: 10–3 (5–3 SEC)
- Head coach: Mark Richt (15th season; regular season); Bryan McClendon (interim; bowl game)
- Offensive coordinator: Brian Schottenheimer (1st season)
- Offensive scheme: Pro-style
- Defensive coordinator: Jeremy Pruitt (2nd season)
- Base defense: 3–4
- Home stadium: Sanford Stadium

2015 Southeastern Conference football standings
	Conf.			Overall
Team	W		L	W		L
Eastern Division
No. 25 Florida x	7	–	1	10	–	4
No. 22 Tennessee	5	–	3	9	–	4
Georgia	5	–	3	10	–	3
Vanderbilt	2	–	6	4	–	8
Kentucky	2	–	6	5	–	7
Missouri*	1	–	7	5	–	7
South Carolina	1	–	7	3	–	9
Western Division
No. 1 Alabama x$#^	7	–	1	14	–	1
No. 10 Ole Miss	6	–	2	10	–	3
Arkansas	5	–	3	8	–	5
No. 16 LSU *	5	–	3	9	–	3
Texas A&M	4	–	4	8	–	5
Mississippi State	4	–	4	9	–	4
Auburn	2	–	6	7	–	6
Championship: Alabama 29, Florida 15
# – College Football Playoff champion; ^ – College Football Playoff participant; $ – Conference champion; x – Division champion/co-champions; * LSU and Missouri vacated all wins due to NCAA violations.; Rankings from AP Poll

The 2015 Georgia Bulldogs football team represented the University of Georgia in the 2015 NCAA Division I FBS football season. The Bulldogs played their home games at Sanford Stadium. They were members of the Eastern Division of the Southeastern Conference. This was head coach Mark Richt's 15th and final season leading the program. Richt was relieved of his duties at the end of the regular season. Richt was originally slated to remain head coach for the team's bowl game, but he was replaced after he reached an agreement to become head coach of the Miami Hurricanes football team. Wide receivers coach Bryan McClendon was named interim head coach for the TaxSlayer Bowl against Penn State.

After starting the season ranked in the top 10, the team completed a second straight 9–3 regular season, finishing third in the SEC East Division after losing to division rivals Florida and Tennessee, as well as a cross-division matchup with Alabama. After the Florida game, the team ended the regular season with a four-game win streak that included road wins over rivals Auburn and Georgia Tech, though it needed overtime to defeat Georgia Southern, a Sun Belt Conference team playing just its second season at the Football Bowl Subdivision level.

== Coaching changes ==
Offensive Coordinator Mike Bobo left his position to accept the head coaching job at Colorado State at the end of the 2014 season. Offensive line coach Will Friend joined Bobo's Colorado State staff as offensive coordinator.

Bobo was replaced by Brian Schottenheimer, who was the St. Louis Rams offensive coordinator the previous 3 seasons. Schottenheimer was the offensive coordinator of the New York Jets from 2006 to 2011 and also coached Quarterbacks for the San Diego Chargers and Washington Redskins. Schottenheimer started playing college football at Kansas before transferring to Florida to play for Steve Spurrier from 1993 to 1996. Rob Sale was hired to coach the offensive line. Sale came from McNeese State where he coached the offensive line the previous 3 seasons.

After wide receivers coach Tony Ball took a position with LSU, Thomas Brown was hired from Wisconsin. Brown, who played running back at Georgia and coached the position at Wisconsin, replaced Bryan McClendon as running backs coach, with McClendon moving to coach wide receivers, the same position he played at Georgia.

== Personnel ==
=== Coaching staff ===
Name	Position	Seasons at Georgia	Alma mater
Mark Richt	Head coach	15	Miami (FL) (1982)
Brian Schottenheimer	Offensive coordinator, quarterbacks	1	Florida (1997)
Bryan McClendon	Wide receivers/Recruiting Coordinator/Passing Game Coordinator	7	Georgia (2005)
John Lilly	Tight ends/Offensive Special Teams Coordinator	8	Guilford College (1990)
Thomas Brown	Running backs	1	Georgia (2008)
Rob Sale	Offensive line/Running Game Coordinator	1	LSU (2003)
Jeremy Pruitt	Defensive coordinator/Secondary	2	West Alabama (1999)
Tracy Rocker	Defensive line/Will Linebackers	2	Auburn (1988)
Mike Ekeler	Inside Linebackers/Defensive Special Teams Coordinator	2	Kansas State (1994)
Kevin Sherrer	Sam Linebackers	2	Alabama (1996)
Buddy Collins	Special Teams Coordinator/Quality Control	3	MidAmerica Nazarene (2010)
Dan Inman	Offensive Graduate Assistant	3	UNC–Pembroke (2012)
Doug Saylor	Offensive Graduate Assistant	3	Georgia (2011)
Kelin Johnson	Defensive Graduate Assistant	2	Georgia (2007)

== Schedule ==
Georgia announced their 2015 football schedule on October 14, 2014. The 2015 schedule consisted of 7 home games, 4 away games and 1 neutral game in the regular season. The Bulldogs would host SEC foes Alabama, Kentucky, Missouri, and South Carolina, and would travel to Auburn, Tennessee, and Vanderbilt. Georgia would meet for the 93rd time with Florida in their annual neutral site rivalry game in Jacksonville, Florida.

The Bulldogs would host three non–conference foes: Louisiana–Monroe, Southern, and in–state rival Georgia Southern. Finally, at the last game of the regular season the Bulldogs would travel to Georgia Tech in Atlanta.

Date	Time	Opponent	Rank	Site	TV	Result	Attendance
September 5	12:00 p.m.	Louisiana–Monroe*	No. 9	Sanford Stadium; Athens, GA	SECN	W 51–14	92,746
September 12	3:30 p.m.	at Vanderbilt	No. 10	Vanderbilt Stadium; Nashville, TN (rivalry / SEC Nation)	CBS	W 31–14	37,185
September 19	6:00 p.m.	South Carolina	No. 7	Sanford Stadium; Athens, GA (rivalry)	ESPN	W 52–20	92,746
September 26	12:00 p.m.	Southern*	No. 7	Sanford Stadium; Athens, GA	SECN	W 48–6	92,746
October 3	3:30 p.m.	No. 13 Alabama	No. 8	Sanford Stadium; Athens, GA (rivalry / SEC Nation)	CBS	L 10–38	92,746
October 10	3:30 p.m.	at Tennessee	No. 19	Neyland Stadium; Knoxville, TN (rivalry / SEC Nation)	CBS	L 31–38	102,455
October 17	7:30 p.m.	Missouri^{†}		Sanford Stadium; Athens, GA	SECN	W 9–6	92,746
October 31	3:30 p.m.	vs. No. 11 Florida		EverBank Field; Jacksonville, FL (rivalry)	CBS	L 3–27	84,628
November 7	12:00 p.m.	Kentucky		Sanford Stadium; Athens, GA	SECN	W 27–3	92,746
November 14	12:00 p.m.	at Auburn		Jordan–Hare Stadium; Auburn, AL (Deep South's Oldest Rivalry)	CBS	W 20–13	87,451
November 21	7:15 p.m.	Georgia Southern*		Sanford Stadium; Athens, GA	ESPNU	W 23–17 ^{OT}	92,746
November 28	12:00 p.m.	at Georgia Tech*		Bobby Dodd Stadium; Atlanta, GA (Clean, Old-Fashioned Hate)	ESPN2	W 13–7	55,000
January 2, 2016	12:00 p.m.	vs. Penn State*		EverBank Field; Jacksonville, FL (TaxSlayer Bowl)	ESPN	W 24–17	58,212
*Non-conference game; ^{†}Homecoming; Rankings from AP Poll released prior to game; All times are in Eastern time

Schedule source:

== Game summaries ==
=== Louisiana–Monroe ===
Louisiana–Monroe Warhawks vs Georgia Bulldogs – Game summary

Quarter	1	2	3	4	Total
Warhawks	0	7	7	0	14
Bulldogs	14	21	9	7	51

at Sanford Stadium • Athens, GA

- Date: September 5, 2015
- Game time: 12:01 p.m. EDT
- Game attendance: 92,746
- Referee: Hubert Owens
- TV announcers (SECN): Dave Neal (Play-by-play), Matt Stinchcomb (Color) & Kayce Smith (Sideline)

=== Vanderbilt ===
Georgia Bulldogs vs Vanderbilt Commodores – Game summary

Quarter	1	2	3	4	Total
Bulldogs	7	7	10	7	31
Commodores	0	6	0	8	14

at Vanderbilt Stadium • Nashville, TN

- Date: September 12, 2015
- Game time: 2:39 p.m. CDT
- Game attendance: 37,185
- Referee: David Smith
- TV announcers (CBS): Verne Lundquist (Play-by-play) & Gary Danielson (Color)

=== South Carolina ===
South Carolina Gamecocks at Georgia Bulldogs – Game summary

Quarter	1	2	3	4	Total
Gamecocks	3	10	0	7	20
Bulldogs	3	21	21	7	52

at Sanford Stadium • Athens, GA

- Date: September 19, 2015
- Game time: 6:01 p.m. EDT
- Game attendance: 92,746
- Referee: Matt Austin
- TV announcers (ESPN): Brad Nessler (Play-by-play), Todd Blackledge (Color) & Holly Rowe (Sideline)

=== Southern ===
Southern Jaguars at Georgia Bulldogs – Game summary

Quarter	1	2	3	4	Total
Jaguars	0	6	0	0	6
Bulldogs	17	3	28	0	48

at Sanford Stadium • Athens, GA

- Date: September 26, 2015
- Game time: 12:01 p.m. EDT
- Game attendance: 92,746
- Referee: Brad Rogers
- TV announcers (SECN): Tom Hart (Play-by-play), Andre Ware (Color) & Laura Rutledge (Sideline)

=== Alabama ===
Alabama Crimson Tide at Georgia Bulldogs – Game summary

Quarter	1	2	3	4	Total
Crimson Tide	3	21	14	0	38
Bulldogs	0	3	7	0	10

at Sanford Stadium • Athens, GA

- Date: October 3, 2015
- Game time: 3:39 p.m. EDT
- Game attendance: 92,746
- Referee: Hubert Owens
- TV announcers (CBS): Verne Lundquist (Play-by-play), Gary Danielson (Color) & Allie LaForce (Sideline)

=== Tennessee ===
Georgia Bulldogs at Tennessee Volunteers – Game summary

Quarter	1	2	3	4	Total
Bulldogs	7	17	0	7	31
Volunteers	3	14	14	7	38

at Neyland Stadium • Knoxville, TN

- Date: October 10, 2015
- Game time: 3:39 p.m. EDT
- Game attendance: 102,455
- Referee: Tom Ritter
- TV announcers (CBS): Verne Lundquist (Play-by-play), Gary Danielson (Color) & Allie LaForce (Sideline)

=== Missouri ===
Missouri Tigers at Georgia Bulldogs – Game summary

Quarter	1	2	3	4	Total
Tigers	3	3	0	0	6
Bulldogs	0	3	3	3	9

at Sanford Stadium • Athens, GA

- Date: October 17, 2015
- Game time: 7:39 p.m. EDT
- Game attendance: 92,746
- Referee: John McDaid
- TV announcers (SECN): Brent Musburger (Play-by-play), Jesse Palmer (Color) & Maria Taylor (Sideline)

=== Florida (World's Largest Outdoor Cocktail Party) ===
Georgia Bulldogs vs Florida Gators – Game summary

Quarter	1	2	3	4	Total
Bulldogs	0	0	3	0	3
Gators	6	14	0	7	27

at EverBank Field • Jacksonville, FL

- Date: October 31, 2015
- Game time: 3:39 EDT
- Game attendance: 84,628
- Referee: Tom Ritter
- TV announcers (CBS): Verne Lundquist (Play-by-play), Gary Danielson (Color) & Allie LaForce (Sideline)

=== Kentucky ===
Kentucky Wildcats at Georgia Bulldogs – Game summary

Quarter	1	2	3	4	Total
Wildcats	0	3	0	0	3
Bulldogs	10	0	14	3	27

at Sanford Stadium • Athens, GA

- Date: November 7, 2015
- Game attendance: 92,746
- TV announcers (SEC Network): Dave Neal (Play-by-play), Matt Stinchcomb (Color) & Kayce Smith (Sideline)

=== Auburn (Deep South's Oldest Rivalry) ===
Georgia Bulldogs at Auburn Tigers – Game summary

Quarter	1	2	3	4	Total
Bulldogs	0	3	7	10	20
Tigers	7	3	0	3	13

at Jordan–Hare Stadium • Auburn, AL

- Date: November 14, 2015
- Game attendance: 87,451
- Referee: John McDaid
- TV announcers (CBS): Verne Lundquist (Play-by-play), Gary Danielson (Color) & Allie LaForce (Sideline)

=== Georgia Southern ===
Georgia Southern Eagles at Georgia Bulldogs – Game summary

Quarter	1	2	3	4	OT	Total
Eagles	0	7	7	3	0	17
Bulldogs	7	0	7	3	6	23

at Sanford Stadium • Athens, GA

- Date: November 21, 2015
- Game attendance: 92,746
- TV announcers (ESPNU): Clay Matvick; John Congemi

=== Georgia Tech (Clean, Old-Fashioned Hate) ===
Georgia Bulldogs at Georgia Tech Yellow Jackets – Game summary

Quarter	1	2	3	4	Total
Bulldogs	7	0	3	3	13
Yellow Jackets	0	0	0	7	7

at Bobby Dodd Stadium • Atlanta, GA

- Date: November 28, 2015
- Game attendance: 55,000
- TV announcers (ESPN2): Beth Mowins; Anthony Becht

== Rankings ==
Ranking movements Legend: ██ Increase in ranking ██ Decrease in ranking — = Not ranked RV = Received votes
	Week															
Poll	Pre	1	2	3	4	5	6	7	8	9	10	11	12	13	14	Final
AP	9	10	7	7	8	19	RV	RV	RV	—	—	RV	RV	RV	RV	RV
Coaches	9	9	8	6	6	16	RV	25	23	—	RV	RV	RV	RV	25	24
CFP	Not released									—	—	—	—	—	—	Not released
