= XHRRF-FM =

Radio station in Conkal-Mérida, Yucatán

- Conkal, Yucatán; Mexico
- Broadcast area: Mérida, Yucatán
- Frequency: 88.5 FM
- Branding: Arya FM

Programming
- Format: Adult Contemporary in English

Ownership
- Owner: Grupo Radio Centro; (Estudios Multimedia del Mayab Uno, S.A. de C.V.)
- Operator: Peninsula Studios
- Sister stations: XHYK-FM

History
- First air date: June 3, 1960
- Former frequencies: 1150 kHz, 860 kHz
- Call sign meaning: Rafael Rivas Franco

Technical information
- ERP: 25 kW
- HAAT: 93.52 m
- Transmitter coordinates: 21°03′55″N 89°31′24″W

Links
- Webcast: Listen live
- Website: arya.mx

XHRRF-FM 88.5 is a radio station in Conkal, Yucatán in Mexico.

== History ==
On June 8, 1962, two years after it signed on, XERRF-AM 1150 was awarded to Rafael Rivas Franco, the founder of Grupo Rivas, which still owns many radio stations in Mérida and Yucatán. The station was originally known as Radio Felicidad. In 1967, the station concession passed to Radio Peninsular, S.A., and again in 1997 to Radio Juvenil del Sureste, S.A. de C.V. Not long after, XERRF moved to 860, and soon after that, in the mid-2000s, it was sold to Grupo Radiodigital Siglo XXI, S.A. de C.V., which was in turn sold to Grupo Radio México. At some point thereafter, XERRF changed concessionaires.

On June 4, 2010, XERRF received permission to migrate to FM as XHRRF-FM 88.5.

In late 2020, Grupo Radio Centro transferred operations of XHRRF and XHYK to Peninsula Studios. Both stations received new formats, with XHRRF becoming "Arya FM" broadcasting an English-language pop format focused on music from the 1990s.
