= 2016 TaxSlayer Bowl (January) =

- 71st Gator Bowl
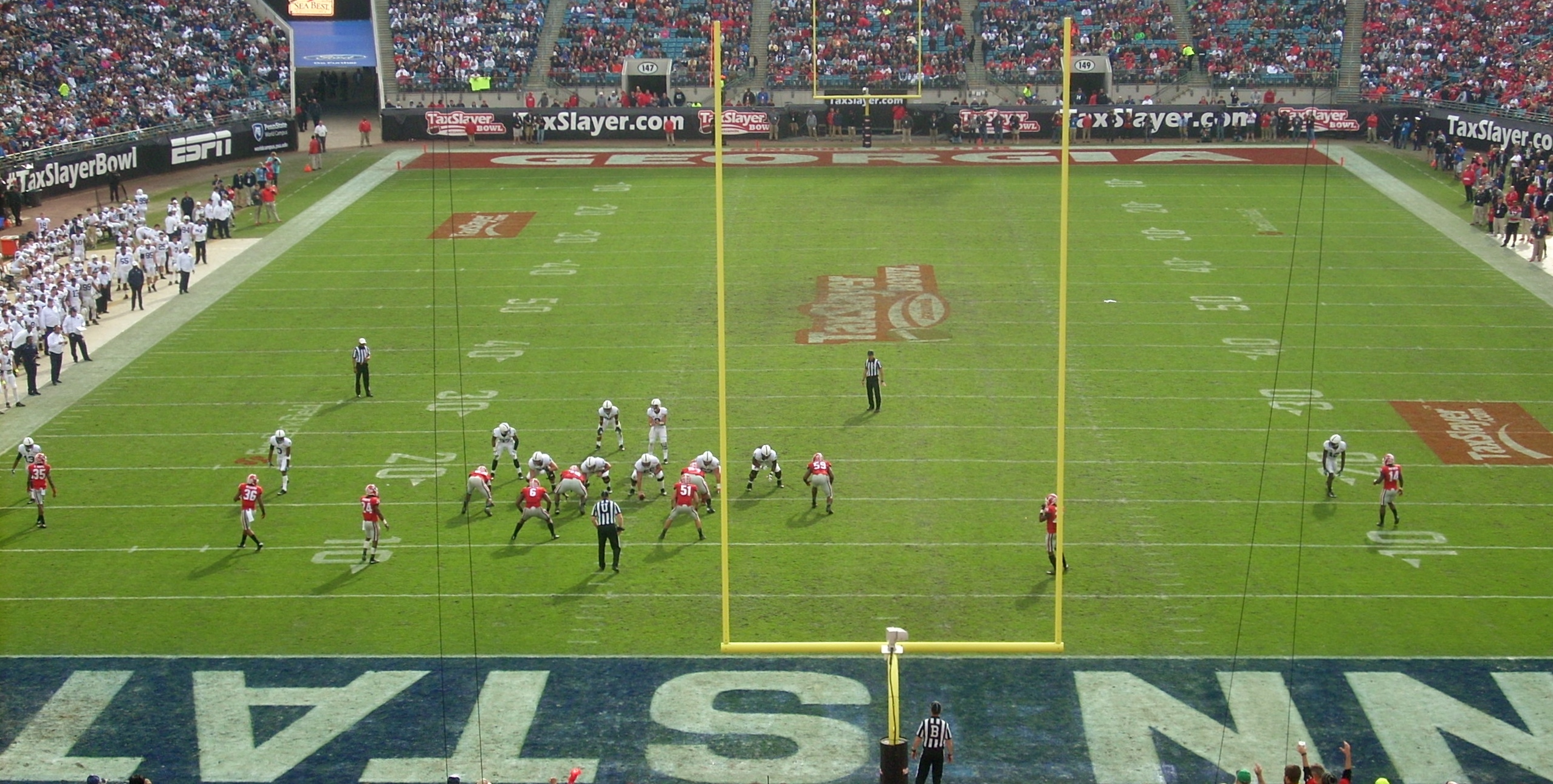
Penn State Nittany Lions	Georgia Bulldogs
(7–5)	(9–3)
Big Ten	SEC
17	24
Head coach: James Franklin	Head coach: Bryan McClendon (interim)
	AP / Coaches / CFP; NR / 25 / NR
	1	2	3	4	Total
Penn State	0	3	0	14	17
Georgia	3	14	7	0	24
- Date: January 2, 2016
- Season: 2015
- Stadium: EverBank Field
- Location: Jacksonville, Florida
- MVP: Terry Godwin (WR, Georgia) & Trace McSorley (QB, Penn State)
- Favorite: Georgia by 6½
- Referee: Mike Mothershed (Pac-12)
- Attendance: 58,212
- Payout: US$2,750,000

United States TV coverage
- Network: ESPN/ESPN Radio
- Announcers: Allen Bestwick, Dan Hawkins, & Tiffany Greene (ESPN); Eamon McAnaney, John Congemi, & Ian Fitzsimmons (ESPN Radio)

The 2016 TaxSlayer Bowl was a post-season American college football bowl game played on January 2, 2016, at EverBank Field in Jacksonville, Florida. The 71st edition of the Gator Bowl featured the Penn State Nittany Lions of the Big Ten Conference against the Georgia Bulldogs of the Southeastern Conference. It began at noon EST and aired on ESPN. It was one of the 2015–16 bowl games that concluded the 2015 FBS football season. The game's naming rights sponsor was tax preparation software company TaxSlayer.com, and for sponsorship reasons was officially known as the TaxSlayer Bowl.

== Teams ==
The game featured the Penn State Nittany Lions against the Georgia Bulldogs; Georgia was the favorite with the opening line with a seven-point spread.

=== Penn State Nittany Lions ===
After finishing their season 7–5, the Nittany Lions accepted their invitation to play in the game.

This was the fifth appearance for the Nittany Lions in the TaxSlayer Bowl and first since 1976. Prior to the game, they were 1–2–1 all-time in the bowl game.

=== Georgia Bulldogs ===
After finishing their season 9–3, the Bulldogs accepted their invitation to play in the game.

This was the fifth appearance of the Bulldogs in the TaxSlayer Bowl, who last appeared in 2014. Prior to the game, they were 2–1–1 all-time.

== Pre-game buildup ==
=== Penn State ===
The biggest storyline entering the bowl game for Penn State was whether it would mark junior quarterback Christian Hackenberg's final game with Penn State, given his option to declare for the 2016 NFL draft. Opinions were mixed on whether he should enter the draft, and two weeks before the bowl game, he sought counsel from the NFL Draft Advisory Board; he did not make a decision before the game.

==== Penn State offense ====
After Penn State lost its final game of the season to Michigan State, James Franklin fired offensive coordinator John Donovan, who engineered an offense that ranked 108th in total yardage, and mustered less than 15 points per game in its five losses. The Lions eventually hired former Fordham head coach Joe Moorhead to replace Donovan in 2016, but in the interim, appointed quarterbacks coach Ricky Rahne to coordinate the offense for the bowl game, which would be his first experience calling plays. Rahne planned to add a touch of "flair" to the offense, but generally stick to the gameplan used during the season.

Entering the bowl game, Penn State's offense was in the bottom quintile among Football Bowl Subdivision (FBS) schools in yards per game, averaging 344. Plagued by injuries and ineffectiveness particularly on the offensive line, both Rahne and senior offensive tackle Andrew Nelson expressed optimism about the continuity the team had achieved during bowl practices. Freshman tailback Saquon Barkley, named the Big Ten's freshman of the year and a member of the freshman All-American team, was called "something special", and looked to build on his record-breaking regular season campaign during which he rushed for over 1,000 yards. At wide receiver, Chris Godwin looked to continue his postseason success (he had a breakout game in the 2014 Pinstripe Bowl) and reach 1,000 receiving yards on the season.

==== Penn State defense ====
Penn State's defense surrendered 55 points in the final game of the regular season, but entered the bowl game with a restored confidence that it was healthy and prepared, particularly along the defensive line, where former walk-on end Carl Nassib – the Big Ten Conference defensive player of the year, a first-team All-American, the team's most valuable player, and winner of the Lombardi Award – and tackle Austin Johnson would return at full strength. Defensive tackle Anthony Zettel commented,

I'm biased, but I feel like we have the best front seven in the country, and we're healthy. We're going to go after it tomorrow.

That core contributed to a pass rush that helped Penn State hold opponents to 174.5 passing yards per game, tenth-best in the country, and combined for 42.5 tackles for loss. Coordinated by Bob Shoop, whom other teams sought to hire despite his lack of interest, Penn State was the 14th-best defense in the country in terms of yards allowed. Sophomore linebacker Jason Cabinda emerged as the vocal leader of the defense after Nyeem Wartman-White was injured during the season opener, and compiled a team-leading 92 tackles during the season. Cabinda's conversion from outside linebacker to inside linebacker pressed redshirt freshman Troy Reeder into action as well, and he finished fourth on the team with 67 tackles. In the defensive backfield, safety Marcus Allen was the leader with 75 tackles, while Grant Haley led the team with six pass breakups.

=== Georgia ===
Mark Richt, who had coached Georgia for 14 seasons, departed the program after the final regular season game of the season. Although initially the school announced he would coach the bowl game, ultimately he was hired at the University of Miami, and did not coach the bowl. Georgia quickly hired University of Alabama defensive coordinator Kirby Smart to replace Richt, but he stayed with Alabama through the College Football Playoff. Consequently, the Bulldogs had to appoint an interim coach, and went with passing game coordinator and wide receivers coach Bryan McClendon, who became the first black head coach in program history; McClendon's bowl game staff was also a patchwork group, including two new coordinators: tight ends coach John Lilly on offense, and outside linebackers coach Kevin Sherrer on defense.

==== Georgia offense ====
UGA’s offense was in a state of chaos leading to the Tax Slayer Bowl. Brian Schottenheimer, offensive coordinator, lead the unit and was blamed for much of the team’s lack of success and partially for the downfall of Mark Richt himself.

Schottenheimer was much maligned as a play-caller this season after Georgia's offense sputtered and failed to move at a consistent pace. Georgia ranks 75th in the nation in total offense at 381.4 yards per game.

The Bulldogs also rank 84th in the nation in scoring at 26.5 points per game.

Quarterback Greyson Lambert was efficient most of the year but was replaced as a starter for the UF game in Jacksonville, FL. Faton Bauta started vs the Gators and after that experiment failed Lambert resumed quarterback duties.

Star running back Nick Chubb was injured for the season following a catastrophic knee injury at Neyland Stadium earlier that season. Sony Michel lead the Bulldogs the rest of the season and was an effective runner.

==== Georgia defense ====
Like Penn State, Georgia had a strong defense, particularly in terms of pass defense, where the Bulldogs relinquished only 146 yards per game, the best in the country. The squad also averaged just 16.9 points allowed per game, and 151.9 rushing yards per game, both of which were also in the top quintile of FBS schools. Without coordinator Jeremy Pruitt, who took a similar position with Alabama, the Bulldogs defense sought to achieve continuity despite coaching changes.

== Game summary ==
=== First quarter ===
Penn State received the opening kickoff, converted an early third-and-long, and advanced to the periphery of field goal range before a screen pass was intercepted. Marshall Morgan was set to attempt a 49-yard field goal, but an offside penalty on Penn State shortened it to a 44-yard attempt, which Morgan made by bouncing the kick off the goalpost and through for a 3–0 Georgia lead. Penn State went three-and-out on its next possession. After exchanging punts, UGA took over inside their own five yard-line.

=== Scoring summary ===
Scoring summary

Quarter	Time	Drive			Team	Scoring information	Score	
Quarter	Time	Plays	Yards	TOP	Team	Scoring information	PSU	UGA
1	7:02	7	26	2:53	UGA	44-yard field goal by Marshall Morgan	0	3
2	8:08	8	72	3:44	PSU	34-yard field goal by Tyler Davis	3	3
2	6:46	3	72	1:22	UGA	Malcolm Mitchell 44-yard touchdown reception from Terry Godwin, Marshall Morgan kick good	3	10
2	0:24	7	58	1:50	UGA	Godwin 17-yard touchdown reception from Greyson Lambert, Patrick Beless kick good	3	17
3	4:15	7	56	2:52	UGA	Sony Michel 21-yard touchdown run, Patrick Beless kick good	3	24
4	14:53	9	75	4:22	PSU	Geno Lewis 17-yard touchdown reception from Trace McSorley, Tyler Davis kick good	10	24
4	6:14	7	58	3:04	PSU	DaeSean Hamilton 20-yard touchdown reception from Trace McSorley, Tyler Davis kick good	17	24
"TOP" = time of possession. For other American football terms, see Glossary of American football.							17	24

=== Statistics ===
Statistics	PSU	UGA
First downs	16	17
Total offense, plays – yards	74–401	64–327
Rushes-yards (net)	120	166
Passing yards (net)	281	161
Passes, Comp–Att–Int	22–42–1	12–23–0
Time of Possession	31:22	28:38

=== Post-game effect ===
In the immediate aftermath of the game, Penn State quarterback Christian Hackenberg thanked his teammates, offensive coordinators, and former head coach Bill O'Brien before announcing he would forgo his final year of NCAA eligibility and enter the NFL Draft, and in doing so, he ended his three-year tenure with the Nittany Lions during which, in the words of LNP sports columnist Mike Gross, "he did everything he could" to help a program in transition.

This game for many UGA followers was an awkward gap between the Richt era and the Smart era. Few of the past staff had stayed. Richt went immediately to Miami, Pruitt left for Alabama and began preparing for their post season. Schottenheimer was not hired immediately as others, but the atmosphere was considered to be acrimonious and he elected not to coach the game. Kirby Smart paradoxically stayed at Alabama through their post season and did not officially begin his duties at UGA until after those commenced.

Bryan McClendon called the offense for UGA and was viewed by many as doing a more than serviceable job. He was summarily hired by Will Muschamp at South Carolina.

The win finalized the 2015 season with a 5 game win streak (including 2 vs rivals Auburn and Georgia Tech) and a 10 win season. While the season was still generally considered to be chaotic, disappointing, and below expectations it did end the past era of 15 years on a high note.
