= XHAS =

XHAS may refer to:

- XHAS-TDT, a television station (virtual channel 33, digital channel 34) licensed to Tijuana, Baja California
- XHAS-FM, a radio station in Nuevo Laredo, Tamaulipas
