= WCLV (disambiguation) =

WCLV may refer to:

- WCLV, a radio station (90.3 FM) licensed to Cleveland, Ohio, which has identified as WCLV since 2022
- WCPN, a radio station (104.9 FM) licensed to Lorain, Ohio, which identified as WCLV-FM from 2001 to 2003 and as WCLV from 2003 to 2022
- WHK (AM), a radio station (1420 AM) licensed to Cleveland, Ohio, which identified as WCLV from 2001 to 2003
- WKLV-FM, a radio station (95.5 FM) licensed to Cleveland, Ohio, which identified as WCLV from 1962 to 2001
- WLGS-LP, a radio station (101.5 FM) licensed to Lake Villa, Illinois, which held the WCLV-LP call sign in 2004
- "WCLV-TV," a fictional television station depicted in "Local 58," a YouTube series by Kris Straub
