= 2021 Alamo Bowl =

Postseason college football bowl game

2021 Valero Alamo Bowl
- 29th Alamo Bowl
Oregon Ducks	Oklahoma Sooners
(10–3)	(10–2)
Pac-12	Big 12
32	47
Head coach: Bryan McClendon (interim)	Head coach: Bob Stoops (interim)
AP / Coaches / CFP; 15 / 15 / 14	AP / Coaches / CFP; 14 / 13 / 16
	1	2	3	4	Total
Oregon	3	0	22	7	32
Oklahoma	6	24	14	3	47
- Date: December 29, 2021
- Season: 2021
- Stadium: Alamodome
- Location: San Antonio, Texas
- MVP: Kennedy Brooks (RB, Oklahoma) & Pat Fields (S, Oklahoma)
- Favorite: Oklahoma by 4.5
- Referee: Mike Roche (ACC)
- Attendance: 59,121

United States TV coverage
- Network: ESPN; ESPN Radio
- Announcers: ESPN: Jason Benetti (play-by-play), Andre Ware (analyst) and Paul Carcaterra (sideline); ESPN Radio: Jorge Sedano (play-by-play), Max Starks (analyst), and Alex Chappell (sideline)

The 2021 Alamo Bowl was a college football bowl game played on December 29, 2021, with kickoff at 9:15 p.m. EST (8:15 p.m. local CST) and televised on ESPN. It was the 29th edition of the Alamo Bowl, and was one of the 2021–22 bowl games concluding the 2021 FBS football season. Sponsored by Valero Energy, the game was officially known as the Valero Alamo Bowl.

== Teams ==
Consistent with conference tie-ins, the game was played between teams from the Pac-12 Conference and the Big 12 Conference. This was the eighth meeting between the programs; entering the bowl, Oklahoma led the all-time series 6–1 as Oregon's lone win came in 2006 at home.

=== Oregon Ducks ===
Oregon completed their regular seasons with a 10–2 record (7–2 in Pac-12 play) then lost the Pac-12 Championship Game to Utah, whom they had previously lost to during the season. The Ducks entered the bowl with a 10–3 record; their only other loss was to Stanford. As head coach Mario Cristobal left the Oregon program to join the Miami Hurricanes in early December, Bryan McClendon was named interim head coach of the Ducks for the bowl game.

=== Oklahoma Sooners ===
Oklahoma completed their regular season with an overall 10–2 record, 7–2 in Big 12 games. After starting their season with nine consecutive wins, the Sooners lost two of their final three games, to Baylor and Oklahoma State. Due to the departure of Lincoln Riley from the Oklahoma program (he was named head coach at USC), former Sooner head coach Bob Stoops was named to lead the team in their bowl game.

== Game summary ==
2021 Valero Alamo Bowl

Quarter	1	2	3	4	Total
No. 14 Oregon	3	0	22	7	32
No. 16 Oklahoma	6	24	14	3	47

at Alamodome • San Antonio, Texas

- Date: Wednesday, December 29, 2021
- Game time: 9:15 p.m. EST (8:15 p.m. local CST)
- Game weather: Indoor
- Game attendance: 59,121
- TV announcers (ESPN): Jason Benetti (play-by-play), Andre Ware (analyst) and Paul Carcaterra (sideline)
- Box score

Game information

First quarter

- 7:56 OKLA – Kennedy Brooks 16-yard rush, Gabe Brkic kick wide. Drive: 9 plays, 54 yards, 4:31. Oklahoma 6–0
- 1:57 ORE – Camden Lewis 24-yard field goal. Drive: 14 plays, 66 yards, 5:59. Oklahoma 6–3

Second quarter

- 13:15 OKLA – Gabe Brkic 40-yard field goal. Drive: 11 plays, 52 yards, 3:42. Oklahoma 9–3
- 10:29 OKLA – Drake Stoops 6-yard pass from Caleb Williams, Gabe Brkic kick good. Drive: 4 plays, 48 yards, 1:50. Oklahoma 16–3
- 4:00 OKLA – Marvin Mims 55-yard pass from Caleb Williams, Gabe Brkic kick good. Drive: 7 plays, 89 yards, 2:20. Oklahoma 23–3
- 0:36 OKLA – Kennedy Brooks 29-yard rush, Gabe Brkic kick good. Drive: 6 plays, 64 yards, 1:17. Oklahoma 30–3

Third quarter

- 11:35 ORE – Travis Dye 11-yard rush, Kris Hutson conversion rush good. Drive: 9 plays, 81 yards, 3:25. Oklahoma 30–11
- 8:38 OKLA – Eric Gray 6-yard pass from Caleb Williams, Gabe Brkic kick good. Drive: 6 plays, 76 yards, 2:57. Oklahoma 37–11
- 7:08 ORE – Dont'e Thornton 66-yard pass from Anthony Brown, Camden Lewis kick good. Drive: 4 plays, 80 yards, 1:30. Oklahoma 37–18
- 4:55 OKLA – Kennedy Brooks 8-yard run, Gabe Brkic kick good. Drive: 5 plays, 75 yards, 2:13. Oklahoma 44–18
- 0:56 ORE – Kris Hutson 34-yard pass from Anthony Brown, Camden Lewis kick good. Drive: 11 plays, 76 yards, 3:59. Oklahoma 44–25

Fourth quarter

- 8:56 OKLA – Gabe Brkic 29-yard field goal. Drive: 12 plays, 53 yards, 7:00. Oklahoma 47–25
- 6:46 ORE – Troy Franklin 30-yard pass from Anthony Brown, Camden Lewis kick good. Drive: 6 plays, 75 yards, 2:10. Oklahoma 47–32

=== Statistics ===
Statistics	ORE	OKLA
First downs	26	27
Plays–yards	73–497	70–564
Rushes–yards	33–191	43–322
Passing yards	306	242
Passing: comp–att–int	27–40–1	21–27–0
Turnovers		
Time of possession	26:26	33:34

Team	Category	Player	Statistics
Oregon	Passing	Anthony Brown	27/40, 306 yards, 3 TD, INT
Oregon	Rushing	Travis Dye	18 carries, 153 yards, TD
Oregon	Receiving	Dont'e Thornton	4 receptions, 90 yards, TD
Oklahoma	Passing	Caleb Williams	21/27, 242 yards, 3 TD
Oklahoma	Rushing	Kennedy Brooks	14 carries, 142 yards, 3 TD
Oklahoma	Receiving	Jalil Farooq	3 receptions, 64 yards
