= XHYK-FM =

Radio station in Mérida, Yucatán

Conkal, Yucatán; Mexico
- Broadcast area: Mérida, Yucatán
- Frequency: 101.5 FM
- Branding: Xé'ek

Programming
- Format: Spanish adult hits

Ownership
- Owner: Grupo Radio Centro; (Estudios Multimedia del Mayab, S.A. de C.V.)
- Operator: Peninsula Studios
- Sister stations: XHRRF-FM

History
- First air date: September 8, 1978 (concession)
- Former frequencies: 710 kHz

Technical information
- Class: B1
- ERP: 25 kW
- HAAT: 96.02 m
- Transmitter coordinates: 21°03′55″N 89°31′24″W

Links
- Webcast: Listen live
- Website: xeek.mx

XHYK-FM 101.5 is a radio station in Conkal, Yucatán, Mexico, primarily serving Mérida. It is known as Xé'ek.

== History ==
XEYK-AM 710 received its concession on September 8, 1978. Like its sister XHRRF-FM, it was part of Grupo Rivas, initially owned by Luis Alberto Rivas Aguilar, and it broadcast with 5,000 watts day and 250 night. In 1999, XEYK was sold to Radimágica de Yucatán, which in turn sold it in 2004 to Siglo XXI, a subsidiary of Grupo Radio México, in turn absorbed by GRC in 2016.

XEYK was cleared to migrate to FM in June 2010.

In late 2020, Grupo Radio Centro transferred operations of XHRRF and XHYK to Peninsula Studios. Both stations received new formats, with XHYK becoming "Xé'ek" (Mayan for "Mix"), airing a Latin music-focused adult hits format.
