= WXMB-LP =

- Myrtle Beach, South Carolina; United States
- Broadcast area: Myrtle Beach, South Carolina
- Frequency: 101.5 MHz
- Branding: WXMB 101.5

Programming
- Format: Christian

Ownership
- Owner: Calvary Chapel of Myrtle Beach

History
- First air date: September 7, 2015
- Call sign meaning: Christ, Myrtle Beach (X = Christ)

Technical information
- Licensing authority: FCC
- Facility ID: 195045
- Class: L1
- Power: 12 Watts
- Transmitter coordinates: 33°43′17″N 78°53′44″W

Links
- Public license information: LMS
- Website: www.wxmbfm.com

WXMB-LP is a radio station broadcasting a Christian format. Licensed to Myrtle Beach, South Carolina, United States. The station is currently owned by Calvary Chapel of Myrtle Beach, and signed on September 6, 2015.

Airing Bible teaching by prominent and local pastors, WXMB-LP's focus is on broadcasting "Word & Worship", programming focused on Bible teaching and Christian worship music.
