= XHDB-FM =

Radio station in Tonalá, Chiapas

- Tonalá, Chiapas; Mexico
- Frequency: 101.5 FM
- Branding: Extremo

Programming
- Format: Pop

Ownership
- Owner: Radio Núcleo; (XEDB Radio, S.A. de C.V.)
- Sister stations: XHEMG-FM

History
- First air date: July 10, 1968 (concession)
- Former call signs: XEDB-AM
- Former frequencies: 1290 AM, 860 AM

Technical information
- Class: B1
- ERP: 25 kW
- Transmitter coordinates: 16°05′58.23″N 93°45′57.2″W

Links
- Webcast: Listen live
- Website: radionucleo.com extremotonala.com

XHDB-FM is a radio station on 101.5 FM in Tonalá, Chiapas, Mexico. The station is owned by Radio Núcleo and known as Extremo.

== History ==
XHDB-FM began as XEDB-AM 1290, with a concession awarded on July 10, 1968, which is when it first went on the air. It was owned by Alberto Muñoa Gómez. In 1988, ownership passed to a corporation, and in the early 2000s, XEDB moved from 1290 to 860 in order to increase daytime power from 1,000 watts to 5,000.

XEDB was cleared for AM-FM migration in November 2010.
