= XHJY-FM =

Radio station in Autlán, Jalisco, Mexico

- Autlán, Jalisco; Mexico
- Frequency: 101.5 FM
- Branding: La 100

Programming
- Format: Regional Mexican

Ownership
- Owner: Radio Mejor; (Mejor Frecuencia de Jalisco, S.A. de C.V.)

History
- First air date: May 4, 1964 (concession)

Technical information
- Licensing authority: CRT
- Class: B1
- ERP: 25 kW
- HAAT: −184.74 m (−606.1 ft)
- Transmitter coordinates: 19°46′4″N 104°14′53″W

Links
- Website: la100autlan.fm

XHJY-FM is a radio station on 101.5 FM in Autlán, Jalisco. The station is owned by Radio Mejor and known as La 100, which offers a Regional Mexican format.

== History ==
XEJY-AM 1540 received its concession on May 4, 1964. It was owned by Roberto Pérez González and operated from El Grullo, Jalisco, as a 500-watt daytimer.

In 1972, XEJY was sold to Radio Sistema del Suroeste and was later moved to 1350 kHz. XEJY would later be moved to 1260 in the 1990s, when it relocated its transmitter to Autlán.

XEJY was authorized for AM-FM migration in 2011. It was transferred to the current concessionaire in 2015. In 2018, the station left the MVS Radio La Mejor format and relaunched as La 100.
