= XHEMG-FM =

Radio station in Arriaga, Chiapas, Mexico

- Arriaga, Chiapas, Mexico; Mexico
- Frequency: 94.3 MHz
- Branding: La Ke Buena

Programming
- Format: Grupera
- Affiliations: Radiópolis

Ownership
- Owner: Radio Núcleo; (XEMG Radio, S.A. de C.V.)
- Sister stations: XHDB-FM

History
- First air date: February 6, 1964 (concession)
- Former call signs: XEMG-AM
- Former frequencies: 1250 AM

Technical information
- Class: B1
- ERP: 25 kW
- Transmitter coordinates: 16°13′51″N 93°55′35″W

Links
- Webcast: Listen live
- Website: radionucleo.com kebuenaarriaga.com

XHEMG-FM is a radio station on 94.3 FM in Arriaga, Chiapas, Mexico. It carries the La Ke Buena national grupera format from Radiópolis.

== History ==
XEMG-AM 1250 received its concession on February 6, 1964, owned by Noe Vázquez Gómez. In 1980, it was transferred to Elena Saenz Vda. de Vázquez after Noe's death; in 2004, the name was corrected to Elena Sanz López. López sold the station to Radio Núcleo in September 2005, a change authorized by the SCT in May 2006; Radio Núcleo moved it to FM in 2010.
