= Bryan McClendon =

American football coach (born 1983)

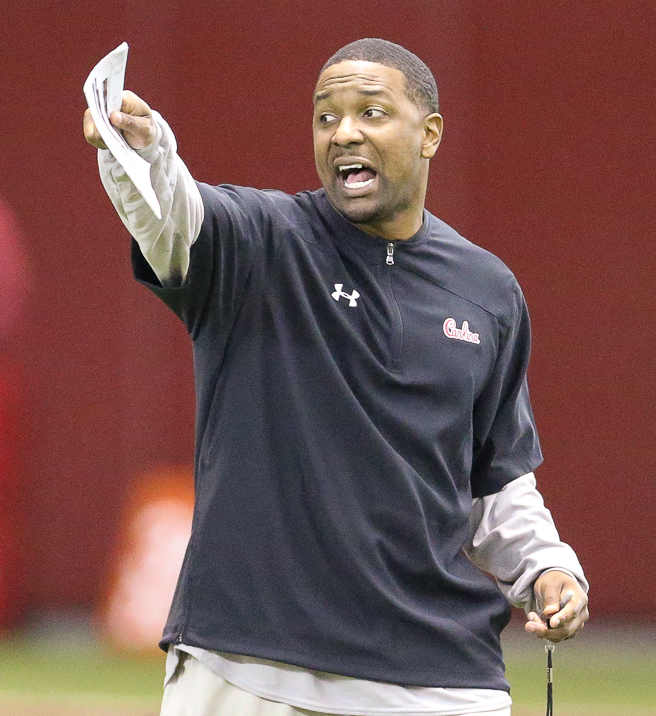

Tampa Bay Buccaneers
- Title: Wide receivers coach

Personal information
- Born: December 28, 1983 (age 42); Chicago, Illinois, U.S.

Career information
- Position: Wide receiver
- College: Georgia

Career history

Playing
- Chicago Bears (2006)*
- * Offseason or practice squad member only

Coaching
- Georgia (2007–2008) Graduate assistant; Georgia (2009–2014) Running backs coach; Georgia (2015) Assistant head coach, wide receivers coach & pass game coordinator; Georgia (2015) Interim head coach; South Carolina (2016–2017) Co-offensive coordinator & wide receivers coach; South Carolina (2018–2019) Offensive coordinator & wide receivers coach; Oregon (2020–2021) Pass game coordinator & wide receivers coach; Oregon (2021) Interim head coach; Georgia (2022–2023) Pass game coordinator & wide receivers coach; Tampa Bay Buccaneers (2024–present) Wide receivers coach

Bryan McClendon (born December 28, 1983) is an American football coach who is currently the wide receivers coach for the Tampa Bay Buccaneers of the National Football League (NFL). He previously served as the passing game coordinator and wide receivers coach at the University of Georgia from 2022 to 2023. As well as the same roles at the University of Oregon from 2020 to 2021 and interim head coach in the Alamo Bowl in 2021.

McClendon was previously the offensive coordinator and wide receivers coach for the University of South Carolina. McClendon also served as the interim head football coach at the University of Georgia for the final game of the 2015 season, the TaxSlayer Bowl.

== Early life and playing career ==
McClendon played high school football at Benjamin E. Mays High School in Atlanta, Georgia. He played wide receiver at the University of Georgia and graduated in 2005. He was part of a senior class that won 44 games, which was the most in Georgia history until the national championship-winning Class of 2022. As a senior in 2005, McClendon caught the game-winning touchdown pass from DJ Shockley with 3:18 left in Georgia's 14–7 win over Georgia Tech. After college, he spent one summer with the Chicago Bears of the National Football League (NFL).

== Coaching career ==
=== Georgia ===
McClendon began his career at Georgia as a graduate assistant and was promoted to running backs coach when Tony Ball was moved to wide receivers coach. From 2009 to 2013, he served as the running backs coach for Georgia, but was reassigned to wide receivers coach in 2015 after Thomas Brown was hired from the Wisconsin Badgers. From 2013 to 2015, McClendon served as the recruiting coordinator for Georgia. On January 12, 2015, he was promoted and given the title of assistant head coach. Following the departure of Mark Richt from Georgia in late 2015, McClendon was named interim head coach for the TaxSlayer Bowl.

=== South Carolina ===
After Georgia hired Kirby Smart as their new head coach, McClendon left to become the co-offensive coordinator and wide receivers coach at the University of South Carolina. On January 5, 2018, McClendon was promoted to offensive coordinator for the Gamecocks. However, he was demoted after the conclusion of the 2019 season as South Carolina's offense only scored one touchdown in their last twelve quarters of football. After being demoted, he resumed his prior role as wide receivers coach without coordinator responsibilities.

=== Oregon ===
On April 17, 2020, McClendon was hired as the passing game coordinator and wide receivers coach at the University of Oregon. On December 6, 2021, McClendon was named the interim head coach for the Alamo Bowl following Mario Cristobal's departure to become the head coach at the University of Miami. Following the season, McClendon was offered a position by Cristobal and the Miami Hurricanes staff, which he ultimately turned down.

=== Return to Georgia ===
On January 31, 2022, McClendon was hired as the wide receivers coach and passing game coordinator at Georgia. McClendon was initially set to be the co-offensive coordinator for the Miami Hurricanes before Georgia offered him a position on its coaching staff. He replaced Cortez Hankton, who left Georgia for the same position at LSU. This was McClendon's second coaching stint with the Bulldogs, as he served under former Georgia head coach Mark Richt from 2007 to 2015. He was part of the staff on the Georgia team that defeated TCU in the National Championship.

=== Tampa Bay Buccaneers ===
On February 23, 2024, McClendon was named wide receivers coach for the Tampa Bay Buccaneers.

== Personal life ==
McClendon is married to the former Amber Arnold of Atlanta. They have one son, Bryan. McClendon is the son of former running back Willie McClendon, who also played at Georgia and with the Chicago Bears.

== Head coaching record ==
Year	Team	Overall	Conference	Standing	Bowl/playoffs	Coaches^{#}	AP^{°}
Georgia Bulldogs (Southeastern Conference) (2015)
2015	Georgia	1–0	0–0		W TaxSlayer Bowl	24	
Georgia:		1–0	0–0				
Oregon Ducks (Pac-12 Conference) (2021)
2021	Oregon	0–1	0–0		L Alamo	21	22
Oregon:		0–1	0–0				
Total:		1–1					
