= KTKE =

- Truckee, California; United States
- Frequency: 101.5 MHz

Programming
- Format: Adult Album Alternative

Ownership
- Owner: Joel Depaoli; (Truckee Tahoe Radio, LLC)

Technical information
- Licensing authority: FCC
- Facility ID: 88673
- Class: A
- ERP: 140 watts
- HAAT: 606 meters (1,988 ft)
- Transmitter coordinates: 39°14′29″N 120°08′20″W

Links
- Public license information: Public file; LMS
- Webcast: Listen live
- Website: truckeetahoeradio.com

KTKE (101.5 FM) is a radio station licensed to Truckee, California. The station broadcasts an Adult Album Alternative format and is owned by Joel Depaoli, through licensee Truckee Tahoe Radio, LLC.
