= DWEJ =

Radio station in Lucena, Philippines

Cool 101.5 (DWEJ)
- Lucena; Philippines
- Broadcast area: Quezon and surrounding areas
- Frequency: 101.5 MHz
- Branding: Cool 101.5

Programming
- Languages: English, Filipino
- Format: Christian Music, News, Talk

Ownership
- Owner: UBC Media

History
- First air date: October 2019
- Former names: QFM (September 2024-April 2025)

Technical information
- Licensing authority: NTC
- Power: 5 kW

Cool 101.5 (DWEJ 101.5 MHz) is an FM station owned and operated by UBC Media (Love Radio Network). Its studios and transmitter are located at the 4th Floor, LSC Building, Allarey St., Brgy. 3, Lucena.
