= KBWV-LP =

- Bacavi, Arizona; United States
- Broadcast area: Winslow, Arizona
- Frequency: 101.5 MHz

Programming
- Format: Variety

Ownership
- Owner: The Path Inc.

Technical information
- Licensing authority: FCC
- Facility ID: 134896
- Class: L1
- ERP: 1 watt
- HAAT: 383.9 meters (1259 feet)
- Transmitter coordinates: 35°15′19″N 110°39′35″W

Links
- Public license information: LMS

KBWV-LP (101.5 FM) is a radio station licensed to serve Bacavi, Arizona. The station is owned by The Path Inc. It airs a Variety music format.

The station was assigned the KBWV-LP call letters by the Federal Communications Commission on September 18, 2003.

== Construction permit ==
On December 3, 2007, the FCC issued the station a construction permit to change its community of license to Kykotsmovi Village, Arizona, with a rise in effective radiated power to 100 watts and a lowering of the antenna's height above average terrain to -22.3 meters (-72 feet). The new transmitter location would be 35°52'53"N, 110°36'27"W. This construction permit expires on June 3, 2009.
