= WDKC =

- Covington, Pennsylvania; United States
- Frequency: 101.5 MHz
- Branding: KC101 Hometown Country

Programming
- Format: Country

Ownership
- Owner: Mid-Atlantic Broadcasting, Inc.

History
- Former call signs: WHMU (1991–1993)

Technical information
- Licensing authority: FCC
- Facility ID: 36240
- Class: A
- ERP: 1,900 watts
- HAAT: 181.0 meters (593.8 ft)
- Transmitter coordinates: 41°43′25.00″N 77°2′46.00″W
- Translators: W246AL (97.1 MHz, Wellsboro)
- Repeater: WDKC-FM1

Links
- Public license information: Public file; LMS
- Website: kc101fm.com

WDKC (101.5 FM, "KC101 Hometown Country") is a radio station broadcasting a country music format. Licensed to Covington, Pennsylvania, United States, the station is currently owned by Mid-Atlantic Broadcasting, Inc.
