= KOCC-LP =

Radio station in Oxnard, California

- Oxnard, California; United States
- Broadcast area: Oxnard—Ventura, California
- Frequency: 101.5 MHz
- Branding: Radio Calvario

Programming
- Format: Spanish Christian

Ownership
- Owner: Calvary Chapel of Oxnard

History
- First air date: 2014
- Call sign meaning: Oxnard Calvary Chapel

Technical information
- Licensing authority: FCC
- Facility ID: 124258
- Class: L1
- ERP: 100 watts
- HAAT: 1.3 meters (4.3 ft)
- Transmitter coordinates: 34°11′55.00″N 119°9′16.00″W

Links
- Public license information: LMS
- Website: www.calvariooxnard.org/index.php/radio-calvario

KOCC-LP (101.5 FM, "Radio Calvario") is a low-power FM radio station licensed to Oxnard, California, United States, and serving the Ventura County area. The station is owned by Calvary Chapel of Oxnard and broadcasts a Christian radio format featuring sermons and worship music.

KOCC-LP began operating in 2014. As of 2024 flipped from worship 101 to a Spanish Christian format as Radio Calvario
