= NFL Draft Advisory Board =

Group of American football draft analysts

The NFL Draft Advisory Board (sometimes initialized as the NFLDAB) is a panel of professional football scouting experts who offer advisory opinions to college football players as to the likely level of demand for the players' services during the NFL draft.

== Background ==
The board was created in 1994 to assist those college football players who were eligible to continue playing NCAA football or enter the NFL draft. Although the NFL had begun permitting such "underclassmen" to apply for the draft in 1989, within a few years it was clear that commission-based sports agents had deluded many of them as to their likely demand by teams and future salaries. 76 of the first 165 underclassmen to apply were not drafted, and once a college football player has entered the draft, he is no longer eligible to play college football. Thus, it was important that such players understand whether they would likely be among the small number of players drafted, and what their salaries might be, before committing to the process.

== Board logistics ==
The board is composed of general managers and personnel directors from a number of NFL teams, along with the directors of the NFL's two scouting combines, BLESTO and The National. Before 2015 it issued an advisory opinion that a player has potential to be picked:

- in the first round
- as high as the second round
- as high as the third round
- after the third round
- undrafted

The board has a fair track record that has successfully predicted pick placement for some underclassmen but not others. From 2012 to 2014 it accurately predicted the selections of 73.7% of the players the board graded as first-round selections, and 85.4% of the players it graded for the second, but almost 53% of those receiving third-round grades or lower were not drafted.

The number of underclassmen declaring for the draft rose from 56 in 2011 to 98 in 2014, setting a record each year. After 36 (37%) of those declaring in 2014 went undrafted, and eight schools had more than five underclassmen declaring, the board altered its procedure. As of 2015 it offers three opinions:

- first round
- second round
- neither, which means that the board advises the player to stay in school

Also, the number of players from a school seeking an opinion is limited to five, with some exceptions. The NFL reported that the number of underclassmen requesting evaluations for the 2015 draft declined by 42%, from 214 to 147, and the number declaring for the draft declined by 20.4%, to 76.

== Player's role ==
167 underclassmen applied for an evaluation during the 2007-2008 season. Players typically submit their requests for a Board opinion by late December and, after receiving the panel's report, have until mid-January to decide whether to enter the draft. They have 72 hours after the deadline to change their minds and decide to not enter.

The Board's written opinion is delivered confidentially to the player. While some of the draft-eligible candidates choose to disclose the results to their coaches or to the press, either fully or partially, others do not.

For some players, the Board opinion determines whether they enter the draft while for others, little heed is paid to the opinion. Some players are so sure of what the opinion will say that they do not even wait for it to arrive before deciding on their course, while others listen to their coaches' advice on whether to declare early.
