= KOCL-LP =

Radio station in Anaheim, California

- Anaheim, California; United States
- Frequency: 101.5 MHz
- Branding: "KOCL-LP Christian Radio"

Programming
- Format: Christian

Ownership
- Owner: The Church In Anaheim

Technical information
- Licensing authority: FCC
- Facility ID: 195397
- Class: L1
- ERP: 100 watts
- Transmitter coordinates: 33.8467°N 117.8775°W

Links
- Public license information: LMS
- Website: kocl.org

KOCL-LP is an American low-power FM radio station licensed by the Federal Communications Commission (FCC) to serve the community of Anaheim, California on the frequency of 101.5 MHz. The station license is assigned to The Church In Anaheim, California. KOCL-LP airs a Christian radio format.

The FCC first licensed this station to begin operations on December 14, 2017, using callsign KOCL-LP; the station's call sign had been assigned to it on June 29, 2016.
