= XHAS-FM =

Radio station in Nuevo Laredo, Tamaulipas, Mexico

- Nuevo Laredo, Tamaulipas; Mexico
- Broadcast area: Laredo–Nuevo Laredo
- Frequency: 101.5 FM
- Branding: Fiesta Mexicana

Programming
- Language: Spanish
- Format: Regional Mexican

Ownership
- Owner: Grupo Radiorama; (Publicidad Radiofónica de Nuevo Laredo, S.A. de C.V.)

History
- First air date: March 3, 1948 (concession); 1994 (FM)
- Former call signs: XEAS-AM
- Former frequencies: 1410 AM

Technical information
- Licensing authority: CRT
- Class: A
- ERP: 3,000 watts
- HAAT: 39.7 meters (130 ft)
- Transmitter coordinates: 27.4935327°N 99.515622°W

Links
- Webcast: Listen live
- Website: radioramanuevolaredo.com

XHAS-FM is a radio station on 101.5 FM in Nuevo Laredo, Tamaulipas, Mexico. It is owned by Grupo Radiorama and known as Fiesta Mexicana.

== History ==
XEAS-AM 1410 received its concession in March 1948. By the 1960s, it was owned by José María Villarreal Montemayor, and by the 1980s, ownership had transferred to Deyla Ruiz Guajardo de Villarreal. The station became an AM-FM combo in 1994 and was sold to its current concessionaire in 2000.

On December 15, 2021, as part of the concession renewal process, the station surrendered its AM frequency.
