= Beth Mowins =

American sports journalist and announcer

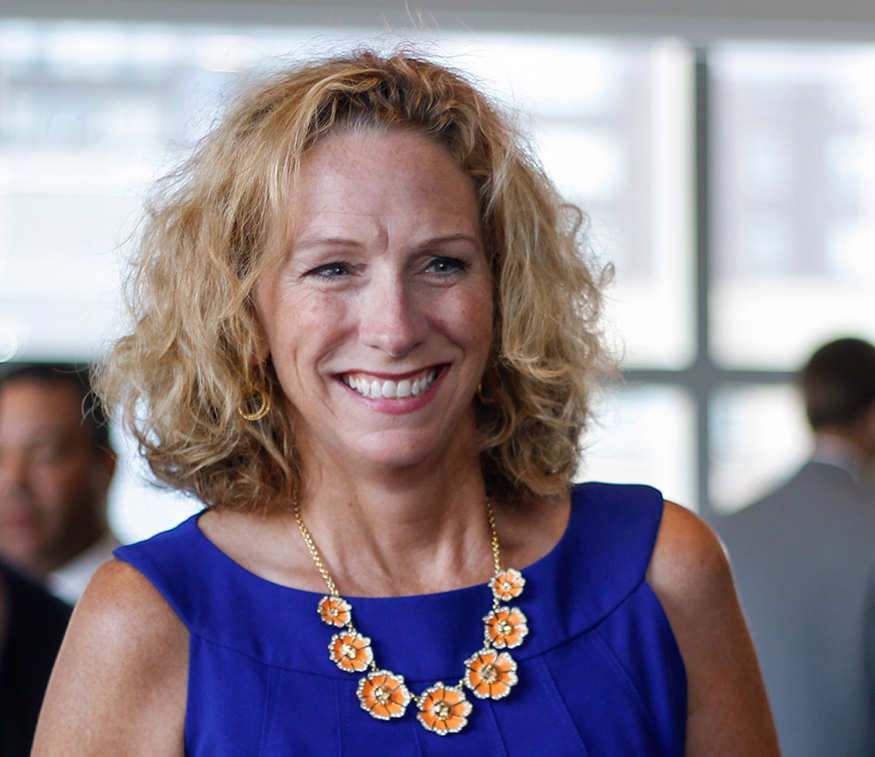
- Mowins in 2015
- Born: Elizabeth Mowins; May 26, 1967 (age 59); Syracuse, New York, U.S.
- Education: Lafayette College (B.A.); Syracuse University (M.A.)
- Occupation: Play-by-play announcer
- Employer(s): ESPN and CBS
- Spouse: Alan Arrollado (m. 2019)

Elizabeth Mowins (born May 26, 1967) is an American play-by-play announcer and sports journalist for ESPN and CBS. She typically calls women's college sports, and became the second woman to call nationally televised college football games for ESPN in 2005. She began doing play-by-play for NFL games in 2017 and became the first woman to call a nationally televised NFL game. In 2021, she became the first woman to call play-by-play for an NBA game on network TV.

== Early life and education ==
Mowins was born in Syracuse, New York, having three brothers; her father was a high-school basketball coach. She was a basketball, softball and soccer player at Cicero-North Syracuse High School in North Syracuse, New York. She was captain of the varsity basketball team for two seasons at Lafayette College in Easton, Pennsylvania. She graduated from Lafayette with a BA in 1989, and from Syracuse University's S. I. Newhouse School of Public Communications with a master's degree in broadcast and digital journalism in 1990.

== Career ==
Mowins began her career in 1991 as news and sports director for WXHC-FM Radio in Homer, New York, and is one of the 2009 inductees into the Greater Syracuse Sports Hall of Fame.

Mowins joined ESPN in 1994, covering college sports, including basketball, football, softball, soccer and volleyball. She has been the network's lead voice on softball coverage, including the Women's College World Series.

Mowins was paired with Cat Whitehill on ESPN's tertiary broadcast team for the telecasts of the 2011 FIFA Women's World Cup.

In 2015, Mowins became the play-by-play voice for Oakland and later Las Vegas Raiders pre-season TV broadcasts.

In May 2017, Mowins was reported by Sports Illustrated's Richard Deitsch to be the chosen play-by-play announcer on ESPN's Monday Night Football opening week late broadcast between the Los Angeles Chargers and Denver Broncos. She did that announcing job in September of that year, and thus became the first woman to call a nationally televised NFL game. That also made her only the second female play-by-play announcer in NFL regular season history; Gayle Sierens was a play-by-play announcer for a game of the NFL regular season in 1987 for NBC Sports.

Mowins also became the first female play-by-play announcer to call NFL for CBS Sports in the network's 58-year history when she called the 2017 season's Cleveland Browns–Indianapolis Colts matchup with Jay Feely. In February 2021 Mowins was named as a fill-in play-by-play announcer for Chicago Cubs games on Marquee Sports. On May 8, 2021, she became the first woman to call one of the team's regular season games.

In 2021, Mowins made her NBC Olympics debut hosting softball for the 2020 Tokyo Olympics. In the same year, she began calling the NBA games on ESPN. In 2022, she worked with analyst Doris Burke in calling an NBA game, as part of ESPN's plan to have an all-women broadcasting and production crew for the first time on a national scale. Mowins and Burke returned together the following season during International Women's Day 2023.

== Career statistics ==
=== College ===
Year	Team	GP	GS	MPG	FG%	3P%	FT%	RPG	APG	SPG	BPG	TO	PPG
1987–88	Lafayette	30	-	-	42.7	0.0	72.2	3.2	6.4	3.0	0.0	-	8.5
1988–89	Lafayette	29	-	-	48.7	40.8	79.7	3.8	6.1	3.1	0.0	-	14.6
Career		59	-	-	46.2	34.5	76.6	3.5	6.2	3.0	0.0	-	11.5
Statistics retrieved from Sports-Reference.

== Personal life ==
Mowins is married to Alan Arrollado, and stepmother to his son, Matt.
