= KOCI-LP =

Community radio station in Newport Beach, California

- Newport Beach, California; United States
- Broadcast area: Orange County, California
- Frequency: 101.5 MHz
- Branding: KOCI 101.5 FM

Programming
- Format: Classic rock

Ownership
- Owner: Orange County Community Radio

Technical information
- Licensing authority: FCC
- ERP: 42 watts
- HAAT: 45.66 meters (149.8 ft)
- Transmitter coordinates: 33.629°N 117.910°W

Links
- Public license information: LMS
- Webcast: Listen Live
- Website: www.kociradio.com

KOCI-LP (101.5 FM) is a low-power FM radio station branded as "101.5 KOCI". This station is broadcasting a Classic rock music format. This station is licensed to Newport Beach, California and is broadcasting to the Orange County area. It can be heard in Costa Mesa, and can reach as far as Westminster, Garden Grove, and Tustin. The station operates at a low power in order to avoid co-channel interference to KGB-FM, in distant San Diego, which also broadcasts at 101.5 FM and airs a Classic Rock format, reaching San Clemente. Home of Uncle Al.

== History ==
The original proposal for the station was written by Brian Helvey (current KOCI Director) in 2000.
