= KLJJ-LP =

Radio station in Spring, Texas, United States

- Spring, Texas; United States
- Broadcast area: Shenandoah, Texas; The Woodlands, Texas
- Frequency: 101.5 MHz
- Branding: 101.5 KLJJ

Programming
- Format: Christian community radio

Ownership
- Owner: The Lion of the Tribe of Judah; (Mark Green)

History
- First air date: June 6, 2016
- Call sign meaning: Lion of the Tribe of Judah

Technical information
- Licensing authority: FCC
- Facility ID: 195164
- Class: D
- ERP: 95 watts
- HAAT: 31 meters (102 ft)
- Transmitter coordinates: 30°10′59.20″N 95°27′10.80″W

Links
- Public license information: LMS
- Website: kljj.org

KLJJ-LP (101.5 FM) is a terrestrial American low power radio station, licensed to Spring, Texas, United States, and is owned by The Lion of the Tribe of Judah of Conroe, Texas.

KLJJ's tower site is located directly behind the former 106.9 KJOJ-FM and 880 KJOJ studio building on Interstate Highway 45 north, between Texas State Highway 242 and Research Forest Drive in Shenandoah, Texas.
