= KCYR-LP =

- Kerrville, Texas; United States
- Frequency: 101.5 MHz

Programming
- Format: religious radio

Ownership
- Owner: Trinity Baptist Church

Technical information
- Licensing authority: FCC
- Facility ID: 134081
- Class: L1
- ERP: 100 watts
- HAAT: 1.3 meters (4.3 ft)
- Transmitter coordinates: 30°3′46″N 99°9′17″W

Links
- Public license information: LMS
- Webcast: https://ice42.securenetsystems.net/KCYR

KCYR-LP (101.5 FM) is a radio station licensed to Kerrville, Texas, United States. The station is currently owned by Trinity Baptist Church.
