= Dont'e Thornton =

American football player (born 2002)

No. 10 – Las Vegas Raiders
- Position: Wide receiver
- Roster status: Active

Personal information
- Born: November 30, 2002 (age 23)
- Listed height: 6 ft 5 in (1.96 m)
- Listed weight: 205 lb (93 kg)

Career information
- High school: Mount Saint Joseph (Baltimore, Maryland)
- College: Oregon (2021–2022); Tennessee (2023–2024)
- NFL draft: 2025: 4th round, 108th overall pick

Career history
- Las Vegas Raiders (2025–present)

Career NFL statistics as of 2025
- Receptions: 10
- Receiving yards: 135
- Stats at Pro Football Reference

Dont'e Terrell Thornton Jr. (born November 30, 2002) is an American professional football wide receiver for the Las Vegas Raiders of the National Football League (NFL). He played college football for the Oregon Ducks and Tennessee Volunteers and was selected by the Raiders in the fourth round of the 2025 NFL draft.

== Early life ==
Thornton attended Mount Saint Joseph High School in Baltimore, Maryland. He was rated as a four-star recruit and committed to play for the Oregon Ducks.

== College career ==
=== Oregon ===
As a freshman in 2021, Thornton notched nine receptions for 175 yards and two touchdowns. In 2022, he appeared in 11 games for the Ducks with five starts, where he hauled in 17 receptions for 366 yards and a touchdown. After the season, Thornton entered his name into the NCAA transfer portal.

=== Tennessee ===
Thornton transferred to play for the Tennessee Volunteers. In week 11 of the 2023 season, he hauled in a 46 yard touchdown but suffered a season-ending injury on the play versus Missouri. In his first season with the Volunteers in 2023, Thornton hauled in 13 receptions for 224 yards and one touchdown. In the 2024 season opener, he hauled in three receptions for 105 yards and two touchdowns in a win over Chattanooga. In week 11, Thornton hauled in three receptions for 104 yards and a touchdown in a win over Mississippi State. In the 2024 season, he finished with 26 receptions for 661 yards and six touchdowns.

== Professional career ==
Pre-draft measurables
Height	Weight	Arm length	Hand span	Wingspan	40-yard dash	10-yard split	20-yard split	Vertical jump	Broad jump
6 ft 4 5/8 in (1.95 m)	205 lb (93 kg)	32 1/8 in (0.82 m)	9 5/8 in (0.24 m)	6 ft 7 in (2.01 m)	4.30 s	1.51 s	2.53 s	33.0 in (0.84 m)	10 ft 6 in (3.20 m)
All values from NFL Combine

Thornton was selected by the Las Vegas Raiders with the 108th overall pick in the fourth round of the 2025 NFL draft. In his NFL debut, he had two receptions for 45 yards in a 20–13 win over the New England Patriots in Week 1. Thornton made 15 appearances (including eight starts) for Las Vegas during his rookie campaign, recording 10 receptions for 135 yards.

On August 31, 2026, Thornton was placed on injured reserve due to an undisclosed injury. He was activated on October 27.

== NFL career statistics ==
=== Regular season ===
Year	Team	Games		Receiving					Fumbles	
Year	Team	GP	GS	Rec	Yds	Avg	Lng	TD	Fum	Lost
2025	LV	15	8	10	135	13.5	36	0	0	0
Career		15	8	10	135	13.5	36	0	0	0
