= WXHC =

- Homer, New York; United States
- Broadcast area: Cortland, New York
- Frequency: 101.5 MHz
- Branding: X101

Programming
- Format: Classic hits
- Affiliations: ABC News Radio; Premiere Networks; United Stations Radio Networks; Syracuse Orange

Ownership
- Owner: Eves Broadcasting, Inc.
- Sister stations: X2 Classic Nineties

History
- Founded: June 17, 1991
- First air date: 1991

Technical information
- Licensing authority: FCC
- Facility ID: 20318
- Class: A
- ERP: 1,300 watts
- HAAT: 151 meters
- Transmitter coordinates: 42°41′12″N 76°11′54″W

Links
- Public license information: Public file; LMS
- Webcast: Listen Live
- Website: wxhc.com

WXHC (101.5 FM, "X101") is a radio station broadcasting a classic hits format. Licensed to Homer, New York, United States, the station is owned by Eves Broadcasting, Inc. and features programming from ABC News Radio, Premiere Networks, and United Stations Radio Networks. Recurring shows for the station include Marti and Chris in the Morning, Middays with Matt Brooks, and John Harrison's Afternoon Drive. Harrison Cona serves as the Program Director for WXHC.
