= WLGS-LP =

- Lake Villa, Illinois; United States
- Frequency: 101.5 MHz
- Branding: WLGS 101.5

Programming
- Format: Christian

Ownership
- Owner: Calvary Chapel of Lake Villa

History
- Former call signs: WCLV-LP (2004)
- Call sign meaning: Worshiping Our Loving God and Savior

Technical information
- Licensing authority: FCC
- Facility ID: 126664
- Class: L1
- ERP: 100 watts
- HAAT: 29.7 meters (97 ft)
- Transmitter coordinates: 42°25′18″N 88°06′23″W

Links
- Public license information: LMS
- Website: Official Website

WLGS-LP (101.5 FM) is a radio station licensed to serve the community of Lake Villa, Illinois. The station is owned by Calvary Chapel of Lake Villa. It airs a Contemporary Christian music format, along with locally and nationally produced Christian talk and teaching programs. The station is also heard in eastern Lake County through a translator at 99.9 FM, W260BL in Waukegan, Illinois.

The station was assigned the call sign WCLV-LP by the Federal Communications Commission on January 15, 2004. The station changed its call sign to WLGS-LP on February 20, 2004.

== Translator ==
Call sign	Frequency	City of license	FID	ERP (W)	HAAT	Class	FCC info
W260BL	99.9 FM	Waukegan, Illinois	140797	10	91.3 m (300 ft)	D	LMS
