= Alex Grinch =

American football player and coach (born 1980)

Current position
- Title: Defensive coordinator Safeties coach
- Team: UCF
- Conference: Big 12

Biographical details
- Born: May 29, 1980 (age 45); Grove City, Ohio, U.S.

Playing career
- 1998–2001: Mount Union
- Position: Strong safety

Coaching career (HC unless noted)
- 2002–2004: Missouri (GA)
- 2005–2006: New Hampshire (CB)
- 2007–2008: New Hampshire (DB/RC)
- 2009–2011: Wyoming (DB/RC)
- 2012–2014: Missouri (S)
- 2015–2017: Washington State (DC/S)
- 2018: Ohio State (co-DC/S)
- 2019–2021: Oklahoma (DC)
- 2022–2023: USC (DC)
- 2024: Wisconsin (co-DC/S)
- 2025–present: UCF (DC/S)

Accomplishments and honors

Championships
- As an assistant coach: 2x Big 12 (2019, 2020); 1x Big Ten (2018); 2x SEC East Division (2013, 2014); As a player: 3x NCAA Division III Football Championship (1998, 2000, 2001)

Alexander Gregory Grinch (born May 29, 1980) is an American college football coach who is the defensive coordinator for UCF. He previously served as the defensive coordinator at Wisconsin, USC, Oklahoma, Ohio State and Washington State. Grinch also coached the secondary at Missouri, New Hampshire and Wyoming. Grinch is a four-time nominee for the Broyles Award and was a semifinalist in 2017 and 2019. In all, Grinch has coached two dozen NFL draft picks and 40+ student-athletes who went on to the professional ranks.

== Playing career ==
Grinch played defensive back at Mount Union College from 1998 to 2001. During that time, Mount Union amassed a record of 54–1 and won three NCAA Division III Football Championships. Grinch graduated from Mount Union in 2002 with a bachelor's degree in sport management.

== Coaching career ==
=== Missouri ===
From 2002 to 2004, Grinch was a graduate assistant under Gary Pinkel at the University of Missouri, and he completed his master's degree in educational leadership and policy analysis at Missouri in 2004.

=== New Hampshire ===
Grinch's first regular assistant coaching job was at Division I-AA New Hampshire under Sean McDonnell. In 2005 and 2006, Grinch was the cornerbacks coach. After a promotion, Grinch became the recruiting coordinator and coached the entire defensive secondary in 2007 and 2008. Chip Kelly was the OC at New Hampshire and Grinch learned the value of practicing fast from competing against him every day. Grinch mentored Corey Graham who would set school honors and was drafted in 5th round of 2007 NFL draft. Safety Étienne Boulay was drafted 16th in the 2006 CFL draft and later received the CFL's Frank M. Gibson Trophy for most outstanding rookie.

=== Wyoming ===
Grinch spent three seasons at Wyoming as the recruiting coordinator and coaching the secondary. He coached cornerback Marqueston Huff and safety Chris Prosinski both were drafted into 4th round of NFL. Tashaun Gipson would become a future NFL Pro Bowl safety.

=== Missouri (second stint) ===
Again working under Pinkel, Grinch coached the secondary and safeties at Missouri from 2012 to 2014. In 2013, they finished 11–1 season and their first-ever SEC Eastern Division title. However, they lost to Auburn in the SEC Championship Game. Missouri would go onto winning the 2014 Cotton Bowl Classic against Oklahoma State. In 2014, they clinched another SEC Division title but would lose to Alabama in the 2014 SEC Championship Game. Defensiveback E. J. Gaines would later go onto getting drafted in 2014 NFL draft.

=== Washington State ===
From 2015 to 2017, Grinch was the defensive coordinator and secondary coach at Washington State under Mike Leach Hercules Mata'afa was named Consensus All-American (2017) and the Pac-12 Defensive Player of The Year (2017). He coached several NFL players including: Daniel Ekuale, Frankie Luvu (All-Pro), Hercules Mata'afa and Destiny Vaeao. Which included three NFL Draft picks: Xavier Cooper (3rd round), Jalen Thompson (5th round), and Shalom Luani (7th round).

=== Ohio State ===
In January 2018, Grinch joined Urban Meyer's staff at Ohio State as co-defensive coordinator. The Buckeyes won the Big Ten and Rose Bowl that season. Three Buckeyes were NFL Draft picks during his tenure: Nick Bosa (2nd overall pick), Dre'Mont Jones (3rd round), and Kendall Sheffield (4th round).

=== Oklahoma ===
In January 2019, Grinch joined Lincoln Riley's staff at Oklahoma as defensive coordinator. He spent three years with the Sooners and was able to help turnaround defense that finished 101st in scoring defense and 130th in passing defense, under former defensive coordinator Mike Stoops, who would be fired after giving up 48 points to rival Texas. In 2019, their defense allowed the fewest yards per game, ranking 20th. Oklahoma won the Big 12 championship and advanced to the College Football Playoff semifinals in the Peach Bowl.

Ten Oklahoma defensive players were NFL Draft picks during his tenure: Kenneth Murray (1st round, 23rd overall), Nik Bonitto (2nd round), Brian Asamoah (3rd round), Neville Gallimore (3rd round), Ronnie Perkins (3rd round), Tre Brown (4th round), Perrion Winfrey (4th round), Delarrin Turner-Yell (5th round), Tre Norwood (7th round), and Isaiah Thomas (7th round). He coached several other NFL players at his time at Oklahoma which included: Billy Bowman Jr., Jaden Davis, Ethan Downs, Parnell Motley, Jalen Redmond, Danny Stutsman and DaShaun White.

=== USC ===
In November 2021, Grinch followed Riley after he was hired to be the next head coach at USC, serving in the same capacity as before. At USC he inherited a Trojan defensive roster that in 2021 finished as one of the worst units statistically in program history, ranking 103rd in scoring defense and well below average in all other categories. In his first year at USC, in 2022, the Trojans had the nation's best turnover margin. This marked a huge improvement over 2021, when the Trojans were ranked 74th in the country in the same category. The Trojans focused extensively on turnovers, ranking third in the country with interceptions from a dozen different players. Tuli Tuipulotu was named the Pat Tillman Defensive Player of the Year and unanimous All-American in 2022. They finished the season 11–3, losing to Utah in the Pac-12 championship game, eliminating them from national championship playoff consideration. Mekhi Blackmon was named All-America and drafted in the 3rd round of 2023 NFL draft.

After a promising start with USC, the 2023 Trojan defense would later allow 293 points over the next seven game stretch and fell to 7–3. Of these seven games, opponents scored over 41 points five times. On November 5, 2023, Grinch was fired as USC's defensive coordinator. He coached several NFL players at his time at USC which included: Ralen Goforth, Shane Lee, Brandon Pili, Jaylin Smith and Christian Roland-Wallace. Including four NFL draft picks: Tuli Tuipulotu (2nd round), Calen Bullock (3rd round), Mekhi Blackmon (3rd round), Solomon Byrd (7th round).

=== Wisconsin ===
In February 2024, Grinch joined Luke Fickell's staff at Wisconsin as co-defensive coordinator and safeties coach. The secondary thrived and ranked #14th in country of passing yards allowed.

=== UCF ===
In December 2024, Grinch was announced as UCF's defensive coordinator following the hire of Scott Frost.

== Personal life ==
Grinch grew up in Grove City, Ohio and graduated from Grove City High School. In 2003, he married Rebecca Blaser. They have two children. He is the nephew of longtime Missouri head coach Gary Pinkel, under whom Grinch worked as a graduate assistant and safeties coach.
