= 2019 Oklahoma Sooners football team =

American college football season

2019 Oklahoma Sooners football

Big 12 champion

Big 12 Championship Game, W 30–23^{OT} vs. Baylor

Peach Bowl (CFP semifinal), L 28–63 vs. LSU
- Conference: Big 12 Conference

Ranking
- Coaches: No. 6
- AP: No. 7
- Record: 12–2 (8–1 Big 12)
- Head coach: Lincoln Riley (3rd season)
- Co-offensive coordinators: Cale Gundy (3rd season); Bill Bedenbaugh (3rd season)
- Offensive scheme: Air raid
- Defensive coordinator: Alex Grinch (1st season)
- Base defense: 3–4
- Home stadium: Gaylord Family Oklahoma Memorial Stadium

Uniform
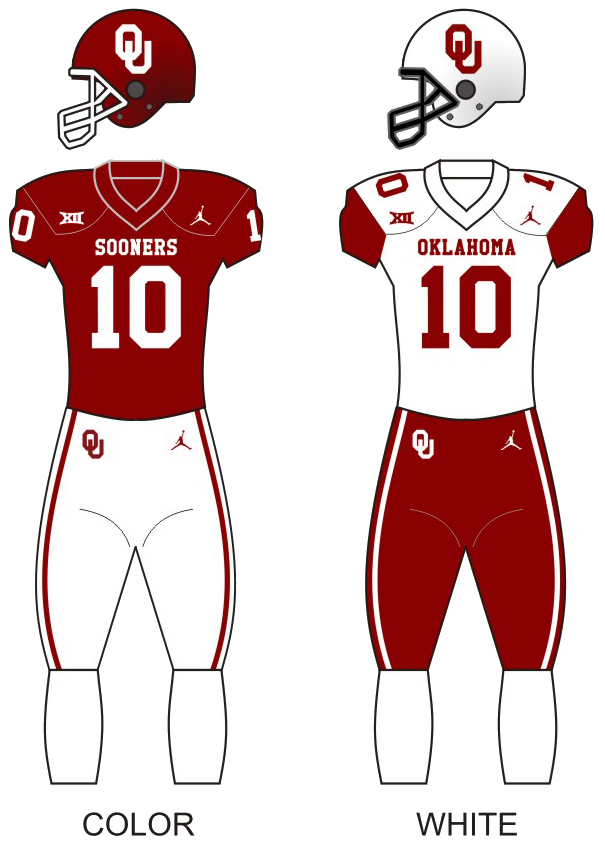

2019 Big 12 Conference football standings
	Conf.			Overall
Team	W		L	W		L
No. 7 Oklahoma y$^	8	–	1	12	–	2
No. 13 Baylor y	8	–	1	11	–	3
No. 25 Texas	5	–	4	8	–	5
Oklahoma State	5	–	4	8	–	5
Kansas State	5	–	4	8	–	5
Iowa State	5	–	4	7	–	6
West Virginia	3	–	6	5	–	7
TCU	3	–	6	5	–	7
Texas Tech	2	–	7	4	–	8
Kansas	1	–	8	3	–	9
Championship: Oklahoma 30, Baylor 23 ^{OT}
^ – College Football Playoff participant; $ – Conference champion; y – Championship game participant; Rankings from AP Poll

The 2019 Oklahoma Sooners football team represented the University of Oklahoma in the 2019 NCAA Division I FBS football season, the 125th season for the Oklahoma Sooners. The team was led by Lincoln Riley, in his third year as head coach. They played their home games at Gaylord Family Oklahoma Memorial Stadium in Norman, Oklahoma. They were a charter member of the Big 12 Conference.

Oklahoma began the year ranked fourth in the AP Poll and were the overwhelming favorites to repeat as Big 12 Conference champions. The Sooners won their first seven games of the season before being upset on the road by Kansas State. On November 16, Oklahoma overcame a 25-point deficit to beat previously undefeated Baylor, 34–31. Oklahoma finished conference play tied with Baylor for the best record in the conference with an 8–1 record, earning them each a spot in the Big 12 Championship Game. There, they defeated Baylor a second time, this time by a score of 30–23 in overtime, to win Oklahoma's fifth consecutive and 13th overall Big 12 title. In the final College Football Playoff rankings of the season, Oklahoma was ranked fourth, earning them a spot in the 2019 Peach Bowl, in a national semi-final game against first-seeded LSU. This was Oklahoma's third consecutive and fourth overall CFP bid. The Sooners fell to the Tigers, 63–28, to end the season at 12–2, and were ranked seventh in the final AP Poll.

The Sooners were led on offense by quarterback Jalen Hurts, a graduate transfer from Alabama that had previously played in three separate College Football Playoffs with the Crimson Tide. Hurts finished in second in the conference in both passing yards and rushing yards, and led the conference with 53 total touchdowns. He finished in second in voting for the Heisman Trophy. Wide receiver CeeDee Lamb was a consensus All-American. Hurts, Lamb, and center Creed Humphrey were named first-team all-conference. On defense, the team was led by first-team all-conference linebacker Kenneth Murray.

== Preseason ==
=== Award watch lists ===
Listed in the order that they were released

Award	Player	Position	Year
Lott Trophy	Kenneth Murray	LB	JR
Maxwell Award	Jalen Hurts	QB	GS
Maxwell Award	CeeDee Lamb	WR	JR
Bednarik Award	Kenneth Murray	LB	JR
Fred Biletnikoff Award	Grant Calcaterra	TE	JR
Fred Biletnikoff Award	CeeDee Lamb	WR	JR
John Mackey Award	Grant Calcaterra	TE	JR
Rimington Trophy	Creed Humphrey	C	RS SO
Butkus Award	Kenneth Murray	LB	JR
Outland Trophy	Creed Humphrey	OL	RS SO
Outland Trophy	Neville Gallimore	DL	RS SR
Bronko Nagurski Trophy	Kenneth Murray	LB	JR
Dodd Trophy	Lincoln Riley	HC	–
Wuerffel Trophy	Kenneth Murray	LB	JR
Walter Camp Award	Jalen Hurts	QB	GS
Earl Campbell Tyler Rose Award	Kennedy Brooks	RB	RS SO
Earl Campbell Tyler Rose Award	CeeDee Lamb	WR	JR
Earl Campbell Tyler Rose Award	Jalen Hurts	QB	GS
Earl Campbell Tyler Rose Award	Tanner Mordecai	QB	RS FR
Johnny Unitas Golden Arm Award	Jalen Hurts	QB	GS

=== Big 12 media days ===
The 2019 Big 12 media days were held July 15–16, 2019 in Frisco, Texas. In the Big 12 preseason media poll, Oklahoma was predicted to finish atop the standings for the fourth consecutive year.

=== Preseason awards ===
2019 Preseason All-Big 12

- Newcomer of the Year: Jalen Hurts, Oklahoma

All-Big 12 Offense
Position	Player	Class	Team
RB	Kennedy Brooks	So.	Oklahoma
WR	CeeDee Lamb	Jr.	Oklahoma
TE	Grant Calcaterra	Jr.	Oklahoma
OL	Creed Humphrey	Rs. So.	Oklahoma
KR/PR	CeeDee Lamb	Jr.	Oklahoma

All-Big 12 Defense
Position	Player	Class	Team
LB	Kenneth Murray	Jr.	Oklahoma

== Schedule ==
Oklahoma announced its 2019 football schedule on October 18, 2018. The 2019 schedule consisted of 6 home games, 5 away games and 1 neutral-site game in the regular season. The Sooners would host 2 non-conference games against Houston and South Dakota, and would travel to UCLA. Oklahoma would host Texas Tech, West Virginia, Iowa State, TCU and travel to Baylor, Kansas, Kansas State, and Oklahoma State in regular season conference play. Oklahoma would play Texas in Dallas, Texas at the Cotton Bowl Stadium on October 12 in the Red River Showdown, the 114th game played in the series.

Date	Time	Opponent	Rank	Site	TV	Result	Attendance
September 1	6:30 p.m.	Houston*	No. 4	Gaylord Family Oklahoma Memorial Stadium; Norman, OK	ABC	W 49–31	84,534
September 7	6:00 p.m.	South Dakota*	No. 4	Gaylord Family Oklahoma Memorial Stadium; Norman, OK	FSOK PPV	W 70–14	82,181
September 14	7:00 p.m.	at UCLA*	No. 5	Rose Bowl; Pasadena, CA	FOX	W 48–14	52,578
September 28	11:00 a.m.	Texas Tech	No. 6	Gaylord Family Oklahoma Memorial Stadium; Norman, OK	FOX	W 55–16	84,416
October 5	11:00 a.m.	at Kansas	No. 6	David Booth Kansas Memorial Stadium; Lawrence, KS	ABC	W 45–20	34,402
October 12	11:00 a.m.	vs. No. 11 Texas	No. 6	Cotton Bowl; Dallas, TX (Red River Showdown)	FOX	W 34–27	92,100
October 19	11:00 a.m.	West Virginia^{†}	No. 5	Gaylord Family Oklahoma Memorial Stadium; Norman, OK	FOX	W 52–14	82,620
October 26	11:00 a.m.	at Kansas State	No. 5	Bill Snyder Family Stadium; Manhattan, KS	ABC	L 41–48	50,394
November 9	7:00 p.m.	Iowa State	No. 9	Gaylord Family Oklahoma Memorial Stadium; Norman, OK	FOX	W 42–41	83,541
November 16	6:30 p.m.	at No. 13 Baylor	No. 10	McLane Stadium; Waco, TX (College GameDay)	ABC	W 34–31	50,223
November 23	7:00 p.m.	TCU	No. 8	Gaylord Family Oklahoma Memorial Stadium; Norman, OK	FOX	W 28–24	82,241
November 30	7:00 p.m.	at No. 21 Oklahoma State	No. 7	Boone Pickens Stadium; Stillwater, OK (Bedlam Series)	FOX	W 34–16	54,575
December 7	11:00 a.m.	vs. No. 7 Baylor	No. 6	AT&T Stadium; Arlington, TX (Big 12 Championship Game)	ABC	W 30–23 ^{OT}	65,191
December 28	3:00 p.m.	vs. No. 1 LSU*	No. 4	Mercedes-Benz Stadium; Atlanta, GA (Peach Bowl - CFP Semifinal / SEC Nation)	ESPN	L 28–63	78,347
*Non-conference game; ^{†}Homecoming; Rankings from AP Poll and CFP Rankings after November 5 released prior to game; All times are in Central time

== Personnel ==
=== Roster ===
2019 Oklahoma Sooners Football
Quarterback: 1 Jalen Hurts – senior (6'2, 219); 3 Connor McGinnis – (redshirt) senior (6'4, 180); 7 Spencer Rattler – freshman (6'0, 197); 9 Tanner Schafer – (redshirt) junior (6'3, 209); 13 Colt Atkinson – junior (6'0, 176); 15 Tanner Mordecai – (redshirt) freshman (6'2, 212); Running backs: 4 Trey Sermon – junior (6'0, 224); 22 TJ Pledger – sophomore (5'9, 200); 23 Todd Hudson – freshman (5'5, 177); 24 Marcus Major – freshman (5'11, 207); 26 Kennedy Brooks – (redshirt) sophomore (5'11, 205); 27 Jeremiah Hall – (redshirt) sophomore (6'2, 252) (FB+); 29 Rhamondre Stevenson – junior (6’0, 236); 36 Isaiah Harris – (redshirt) freshman (5'9, 199); 41 Coby Tillman – (redshirt) freshman (5'11, 233) (FB+); 49 Dane Saltarelli – (redshirt) freshman (6'3, 231) (FB+); 81 Brayden Willis – sophomore (6'3, 221) (FB+); Wide receiver: 2 CeeDee Lamb – junior (6'2, 189); 3 Mykel Jones – (redshirt) junior (5'11, 188); 5 A.D. Miller – (redshirt) senior (6'3, 189); 8 Trejan Bridges – freshman (6'1, 187); 10 Theo Wease – freshman (6'3, 201); 11 Jadon Haselwood – freshman (6'2, 206); 12 Drake Stoops – (redshirt) freshman (5'9, 169); 14 Charleston Rambo – (redshirt) sophomore (6'1, 175); 83 Nick Basquine – (redshirt) senior (5'11, 192); 84 Lee Morris – (redshirt) junior (6'2, 207); 85 Devin Staton – (redshirt) freshman (6'2, 195); 86 Finn Corwin – freshman (5'8, 169); 87 Spencer Jones – (redshirt) junior (6'1, 196); 88 Jackson Webb – junior (5'11, 163); 89 Damon Smith – freshman (6'1, 179); Tight ends: 15 Austin Stogner – freshman (6'6, 241); Long snappers: 51 Kasey Kelleher – (redshirt) sophomore (5'10, 224); 57 Zach Edwards – (redshirt) freshman (5'10, 185)	Offensive lineman: 52 Tyrese Robinson – OL – (redshirt) sophomore (6'3, 332); 54 Marquis Hayes – OG – (redshirt) sophomore (6'5, 351); 56 Creed Humphrey – C – (redshirt) sophomore (6'5, 325); 59 Adrian Ealy – OT – (redshirt) sophomore (6'6, 328); 61 Ian McIver – OL – (redshirt) sophomore (6'3, 324); 62 David Swaby – OT – (redshirt) sophomore (6'9, 320); 65 Finley Felix – OL – junior (6'5, 311); 69 Clayton Woods – OL – (redshirt) senior (6'2, 287); 70 Brey Walker – OT – (redshirt) freshman (6'6, 338); 72 Stacey Wilkins – freshman (6'6, 310); 73 R.J. Proctor – OL – (redshirt) senior (6'4, 328); 74 Marcus Alexander – OL – freshman (6'3, 308); 75 E.J. Ndoma–Ogar – OL – freshman (6'3, 341); 76 Dalton Bishop – C – (redshirt) sophomore (6'5, 289); 77 Erik Swenson – OT – (redshirt) junior (6'5, 311); 78 Bryce Roberts – OL – junior (6'4, 287); 79 Darrell Simpson – OT – (redshirt) freshman (6'5, 301); Defensive lineman: 7 Ronnie Perkins – DE – sophomore (6'3, 234); 31 Jalen Redmond – DL – sophomore (6'3, 266); 33 Marcus Stripling – DL – freshman (6'3, 247); 45 Joseph Wete – DE/LB – sophomore (6'4, 216); 55 Kenneth Mann – DE – (redshirt) senior (6'3, 255); 58 Caden Blanchard – DL – (redshirt) freshman (6'1, 275); 88 Jordan Kelley – DT – (redshirt) freshman (6'3, 297); 90 Neville Gallimore – DL – (redshirt) senior (6'3, 320); 91 Dillion Faamatau – DT – (redshirt) senior (6'3, 219); 92 Kori Roberson – DL – freshman (6'4, 272); 93 Reed Lindsey – DL – freshman (6'4, 245); 94 Troy James – DT – (redshirt) sophomore (6'1, 304); 95 Isaiah Thomas – DE – (redshirt) sophomore (6'5, 254); 96 LaRon Stokes – DL – junior (6'4, 256); 97 Marquise Overton – DT – (redshirt) senior (6'1, 315); 98 Zacchaeus McKinney – DT – (redshirt) sophomore (6'3, 306); 99 Marcus Hicks – DL – freshman (6'5, 261)	Linebacker: 9 Kenneth Murray – junior (6'2, 238); 19 Caleb Kelly – senior (6'3, 221); 21 Ryan Jones – (redshirt) sophomore (6'2, 236); 23 DaShaun White – sophomore (6'0, 221); 24 Brian Asamoah II – (redshirt) freshman (6'1, 219); 30 Levi Draper – (redshirt) freshman (6'1, 226); 34 David Ugwoegbu – freshman (6'4, 231); 35 Nik Bonitto – (redshirt) freshman (6'3, 225); 36 Josh Schenck – (redshirt) junior (5'11, 209); 37 Easton Reeves – freshman (6'1, 217); 38 Bryan Mead – (redshirt) junior (6'2, 230); 40 Jon-Michael Terry – (redshirt) junior (6'3, 241); 41 Jake McCoy – freshman (6'4, 216); 42 Mark Jackson Jr. – senior (6'3, 265); 57 Brock Prengler – freshman (6'1, 227); Defensive backs: 1 Jordan Parker – DB – (redshirt) junior (6'1, 190); 4 Jaden Davis – CB – freshman (5'10, 175); 5 Woodi Washington – CB – freshman (5'11, 183); 6 Tre Brown – CB – junior (5'10, 182); 10 Patrick Fields – S – sophomore (5'11, 193); 11 Parnell Motley – CB – senior (6'0, 177); 13 Tre Norwood – DB – junior (6'0, 179); 20 Robert Barnes – S – junior (6'2, 207); 22 Jeremiah Cridell – S – freshman (5'11, 194); 25 Justin Broiles – S – (redshirt) sophomore (5'10, 181); 26 Caleb Murphy – S – (redshirt) freshman (5'11, 207); 27 Ty Dearman – S – freshman (5'11, 188); 28 Chanse Sylvie – S – (redshirt) junior (5'11, 187); 32 Delarrin Turner-Yell – S – sophomore (5'10, 175); 34 Eric Gallegos – S – sophomore (5'9, 187); 43 Ryan Peoples – DB – freshman (5'11, 176); 44 Brendan Radley-Hiles – DB – sophomore (5'9, 186); 46 Robert Charlton II – DB – (redshirt) senior (5'10, 181); 48 Eric Windham – DB – freshman (5'10, 175); Placekickers: 30 Calum Sutherland – (redshirt) freshman (5'9, 191); 47 Gabe Brkic – (redshirt) freshman (6'2, 189) (+P); 48 Stephen Johnson – (redshirt) sophomore (6'1, 185); Punter: 46 Reeves Mundschau – (redshirt) freshman (5'11, 179)

=== Coaching staff ===
Name	Position	Alma mater	Joined staff
Lincoln Riley	Head coach / quarterbacks	Texas Tech (2006)	2015/2017
Alex Grinch	Defensive coordinator/ Safeties	Mount Union (2002)	2019
Ruffin McNeill	Assistant head coach/outside linebackers	East Carolina (1980)	2017
Shane Beamer	Assistant head coach for offense / tight ends and H-Backs	Virginia Tech (1999)	2018
Cale Gundy	Co-offensive Coordinator / recruiting coordinator / inside receivers	Oklahoma (1994)	1999
Bill Bedenbaugh	Co-offensive Coordinator / offensive line	Iowa Wesleyan (1995)	2013
Roy Manning	Cornerbacks	Michigan (2004)	2019
Jay Boulware	Special teams coordinator / running backs	Texas (1996)	2013
Brian Odom	Inside Linebackers	SE Oklahoma State (2004)	2019
Dennis Simmons	Outside receivers	BYU (1997)	2015
Calvin Thibodeaux	Defensive line	Oklahoma (2006)	2016
Bennie Wylie	Director of Sports Performance	Sam Houston State (1999)	2018
Clarke Stroud	Director of football operations	Oklahoma (1990)	2018

=== Depth chart ===
Defense

FS
Pat Fields
Justin Broiles
–

JACK	MIKE	WILL	SAM
Caleb Kelly	Kenneth Murray	DaShaun White; Ryan Jones	Jon-Michael Terry; Nik Bonitto
Mark Jackson Jr	Bryan Mead; Levi Draper	Brian Asamoah II	David Ugwoegbu
–	–	–	–

SS
Delarrin Turner-Yell
Robert Barnes
Woodi Washington

CB
Tre Brown
Jordan Parker
–

DE	NT	DE
LaRon Stokes; Jalen Redmond	Neville Gallimore	Ronnie Perkins
Kori Robinson	Marquise Overton; Dillion Faamatau	Marcus Stripling; Isaiah Thomas
–	–	–

CB
Parnell Motley
Jaden Davis
Miguel Edwards
–

Offense

WR
CeeDee Lamb
A.D. Miller
Theo Wease
–

WR
Nick Basquine
Mykel Jones
Drake Stoops
–
–

LT	LG	C	RG	RT
Erik Swenson	Marquis Hayes	Creed Humphrey	Tyrese Robinson	Adrian Ealy
Finley Felix	R.J. Proctor	Ian McIver	Brey Walker	Darrell Simpson
–	–	–	–	–

TE
Lee Morris
Austin Stogner
–

WR
Charleston Rambo
Jadon Haselwood
Trejan Bridges
–
–

QB
Jalen Hurts
Tanner Mordecai
Spencer Rattler

Special teams
PK Gabe Brkic
P Reeves Mundschau
Calum Sutherland
KR Tre Brown
T.J. Pledger
PR CeeDee Lamb
Jaquayln Crawford
LS Kasey Kelleher
Clayton Woods
H Connor McGinnis
Spencer Jones

RB
Trey Sermon
Kennedy Brooks
T.J. Pledger
–

== Game summaries ==
=== Houston ===
Houston Cougars vs No. 4 Oklahoma Sooners – Game summary

Quarter	1	2	3	4	Total
Houston	0	10	7	0	17
No. 6 Oklahoma	14	17	21	7	59

at Gaylord Family Oklahoma Memorial Stadium • Norman, Oklahoma

- Date: September 1, 2019
- Game time: 6:43 p.m. CDT
- Game weather: Temperature: 88 • Wind:ESE 510 (MPH) • Weather: Sunny
- Game attendance: 84,534
- Referee: Mike Roche
- TV announcers (ABC): Sean McDonough (play-by-play), Todd Blackledge (analyst), Holly Rowe (reporter)

Game information

First quarter

- (12:21) OKLA TD – Jeremiah Hall 14-yard pass from Jalen Hurts, Calum Sutherland kick
  Oklahoma 7–0; Drive: 3 plays, 61 yards, 1:10

Second quarter

- (14:10) OKLA TD – Jalen Hurts 1-yard rush, Calum Sutherland kick
  Oklahoma 14–0; Drive: 11 plays, 89 yards, 5:34
- (08:09) OKLA TD – CeeDee Lamb 45-yard pass from Jalen Hurts, Calum Sutherland kick
  Oklahoma 21–0; Drive: 8 plays, 77 yards, 4:13
- (04:58) HOU TD – Kyle Porter 23-yard pass from D'Eriq King, Dalton Witherspoon kick
  Oklahoma 21–7; Drive: 6 plays, 81 yards, 3:11
- (00:26) HOU FG – Dalton Witherspoon 34-yard field goal
  Oklahoma 21–10; Drive: 6 plays, 53 yards, 2:02

Third quarter

- (12:38) OKLA TD – Charleston Rambo 56-yard pass from Jalen Hurts, Calum Sutherland kick
  Oklahoma 28–10; Drive: 5 plays, 75 yards, 2:22
- (07:47) OKLA TD – Jalen Hurts 3-yard rush, Calum Sutherland kick
  Oklahoma 35–10; Drive: 5 plays, 83 yards, 2:20
- (03:03) HOU TD – Mulbah Car 7-yard rush, Dalton Witherspoon kick
  Oklahoma 35–17; Drive: 6 plays, 81 yards, 3:11
- (00:00) OKLA TD – Jalen Hurts 1-yard rush, Calum Sutherland kick
  Oklahoma 42–17; Drive: 6 plays, 79 yards, 3:03

Fourth quarter

- (09:11) HOU TD – Marquez Stevenson 4-yard pass from D'Eriq King, Dalton Witherspoon kick
  Oklahoma 42–24; Drive: 12 plays, 87 yards, 5:49
- (02:11) HOU TD – D'Eriq King 5-yard rush, Dalton Witherspoon kick
  Oklahoma 42–31; Drive: 7 plays, 72 yards, 1:50
- (01:17) OKLA TD – Rhamondre Stevenson 21-yard rush, Calum Sutherland kick
  Oklahoma 49–31; Drive: 4 plays, 42 yards, 0:54

Top passers

- HOU – D'Eriq King – 14/27, 167 yards, 2 TD
- OKLA – Jalen Hurts – 20/23, 332 yards, 3 TD

Top rushers

- HOU – D'Eriq King – 15 carries, 103 yards, TD
- OKLA – Jalen Hurts – 16 carries, 176 yards, 3 TD

Top receivers

- HOU – Marquez Stevenson – 7 receptions, 80 yards, TD
- OKLA – Charleston Rambo – 3 receptions, 105 yards, TD

=== South Dakota ===
South Dakota Coyotes vs No. 4 Oklahoma Sooners – Game summary

Quarter	1	2	3	4	Total
South Dakota	7	0	0	0	7
No. 5 Oklahoma	24	21	21	7	73

at Gaylord Family Oklahoma Memorial Stadium • Norman, Oklahoma

- Date: September 7, 2019
- Game time: 6:06 p.m. CDT
- Game weather: Temperature: 97 • Wind:SSW 10 (MPH) • Weather: Sunny and hot
- Game attendance: 82,181
- Referee: Scott Campbell
- TV announcers (FOX PPV): Ron Thulin (play-by-play), Gary Reasons (analyst) & Lesley McCaslin (sideline)

=== At UCLA ===
No. 5 Oklahoma Sooners vs UCLA Bruins – Game summary

Quarter	1	2	3	4	Total
No. 5 Oklahoma	17	17	7	7	48
UCLA	0	7	7	0	14

at Rose Bowl Stadium • Pasadena, CA

- Date: September 14, 2019
- Game time: 7:00 p.m. CDT
- Game weather: Temperature: 95 • Wind:5 (MPH) • Weather: clear and sunny
- Game attendance: 52,578
- Referee: Brandon Cruse
- TV announcers (FOX): Joe Davis (play-by-play), Brock Huard (analyst) & Bruce Feldman (sideline)

=== Texas Tech ===
Texas Tech Red Raiders vs No. 6 Oklahoma Sooners – Game summary

Quarter	1	2	3	4	Total
Texas Tech	0	10	6	0	16
No. 6 Oklahoma	17	17	14	7	55

at Gaylord Family Oklahoma Memorial Stadium • Norman, Oklahoma

- Date: September 28, 2019
- Game time: 11:05 a.m. CDT
- Game weather: Temperature: 80 °F (27 °C) • Wind: S10-20 (MPH) • Weather: Overcast
- Game attendance: 84,416
- Referee: Reggie Smith
- TV announcers (FOX): Gus Johnson (play-by-play), Joel Klatt (analyst), Jenny Taft (sideline)

Game information

First quarter

- OKLA – Trey Sermon 1-yard run (Gabe Brkic kick), 11:27. Sooners 7–0. Drive: 5 plays, 65 yards, 2:37.
- OKLA – Jalen Hurts 1-yard run (Gabe Brkic kick), 5:14. Sooners 14–0. Drive: 8 plays, 95 yards, 5:12.
- OKLA – Gabe Brkic 34-yard field goal, 0:48. Sooners 17–0. Drive: 6 plays, 42 yards, 2:18.

Second quarter

- TTU – Armand Shyne 13-yard run (Trey Wolff kick), 11:44. Sooners 17–7. Drive: 8 plays, 75 yards, 4:04.
- OKLA – CeeDee Lamb 71-yard pass from Jalen Hurts (Gabe Brkic kick), 11:23. Sooners 24–7. Drive: 1 play, 71 yards, 0:21.
- TTU – Trey Wolff 24-yard field goal, 6:33. Sooners 24–10. Drive: 9 plays, 69 yards, 4:50.
- OKLA – CeeDee Lamb 14-yard pass from Jalen Hurts (Gabe Brkic kick), 2:09. Sooners 31–10. Drive: 10 plays, 75 yards, 4:24.
- OKLA – Gabe Brkic 33-yard field goal, 0:00. Sooners 34–10. Drive: 6 plays, 43 yards, 1:01.

Third quarter

- OKLA – CeeDee Lamb 65-yard pass from Jalen Hurts (Gabe Brkic kick), 14:13. Sooners 41–10. Drive: 2 plays, 75 yards, 0:47.
- TTU – Trey Wolff 36-yard field goal, 7:49. Sooners 41–13. Drive: 5 plays, 35 yards, 3:07.
- OKLA – Trey Sermon 32-yard run (Gabe Brkic kick), 5:00. Sooners 48–13. Drive: 8 plays, 75 yards, 2:49.
- TTU – Trey Wolff 41-yard field goal, 0:24. Sooners 48–16. Drive: 10 plays, 53 yards, 4:36.

Fourth quarter

- OKLA – Rhamondre Stevenson 28-yard run (Gabe Brkic kick), 8:18. Sooners 55–16. Drive: 3 plays, 41 yards, 0:54.

Top passers

- TTU – Jett Duffey – 11/20, 120 yards
- OKLA – Jalen Hurts – 17/24, 415 yards, 3 TD, INT

Top rushers

- TTU – SaRodorick Thompson – 13 carries, 96 yards
- OKLA – Trey Sermon – 7 carries, 76 yards, 2 TD

Top receivers

- TTU – Dalton Rigdon – 2 receptions, 37 yards
- OKLA – CeeDee Lamb – 7 receptions, 185 yards, 3 TD

=== At Kansas ===
No. 6 Oklahoma Sooners vs Kansas Jayhawks – Game summary

Quarter	1	2	3	4	Total
No. 6 Oklahoma	7	14	14	10	45
Kansas	7	0	0	13	20

at Memorial Stadium • Lawrence, Kansas

- Date: October 5, 2019
- Game time: 11:30 a.m. CDT
- Game weather: Temperature:68 • Wind:SW 12 (MPH) • Weather: Overcast, Rain
- Game attendance: 34,402
- Referee: David Alvarez
- TV announcers (ABC): Dave Pasch (play-by-play), Greg McElroy (analyst) & Tom Luginbill (sideline)

Kickoff was delayed from the original start time of 11:00 a.m. to 11:30 a.m. due to lightning and thunderstorms in the vicinity of the University of Kansas.

After the delay, it was called an "easy victory" for the Sooners even though Kansas "outplayed" the Sooners for the bulk of the first quarter. Kansas even scored first with a touchdown after forcing Oklahoma to punt. Kansas then gained 98 yards for their touchdown and led 7–0 in the first quarter. Oklahoma then took control and led 21–7 at halftime.

Oklahoma managed 29 first downs and converted 6 of 9 times on third down, with 545 total yards of offense. Oklahoma also threw an interception for the only turnover of the game. Kansas only managed 18 first downs with 6–14 on third down. They also attempted 2 fourth-down conversions but both were unsuccessful, with a total of 360 yards of offense. Kansas did manage a little more clock time of offense with 30:29 time of possession compared to Oklahoma's 29:31. The final score was Oklahoma 45, Kansas 20.

Oklahoma completed their 22nd straight true road win, which was the second longest streak since at least World War II in major college football when Coach Bud Wilkinson led the sooners to 25 wins from 1953 to 1958.

=== vs Texas ===
No. 6 Oklahoma Sooners vs No. 11 Texas Longhorns – Game summary

Quarter	1	2	3	4	Total
No. 6 Oklahoma	7	3	10	14	34
No. 11 Texas	0	3	14	10	27

at Cotton Bowl Stadium • Dallas, Texas

- Date: October 12, 2019
- Game time: 11:00 a.m. CDT
- Game weather: Temperature: 57 • Wind:ENE 8 (MPH) • Weather: clear skies
- Game attendance: 92,100
- Referee: Mike Defee
- TV announcers (FOX): Gus Johnson (play-by-play), Joel Klatt (analyst), Jenny Taft (sideline)

Game information

First Quarter

- (9:54) OU – CeeDee Lamb 1 yard pass from Jalen Hurts, Gabe Brkic kick
  OU 7–0; 10 plays, 66 yards, 5:06

Second Quarter

- (1:49) OU – Gabe Brkic 19 yard field goal
  OU 10–0; 8 plays, 53 yards, 2:28
- (0:00) UT – Cameron Dicker 49 yard field goal
  OU 10–3; 8 plays, 48 yards, 1:44

Third Quarter

- (8:48) UT – Roschon Johnson 4 yard run, Cameron Dicker kick
  Tied 10–10; 7 plays, 93 yards, 2:40
- (7:45) OU – CeeDee Lamb 51 yard pass from Jalen Hurts, Gabe Brkic kick
  OU 17–10; 3 plays, 75 yards, 1:03
- (4:44) OU – Gabe Brkic 34 yard field goal
  OU 20–10; 6 plays, 21 yards, 2:04
- (0:00) UT – Sam Ehlinger 2 yard run, Cameron Dicker kick
  OU 20–17; 5 plays, 60 yards, 1:30

Fourth Quarter

- (11:56) OU – CeeDee Lamb 27 yard pass from Jalen Hurts, Gabe Brkic kick
  OU 27–17; 6 plays, 75 yards, 3:04
- (6:53) UT – Cameron Dicker 32 yard field goal
  OU 27–20; 13 plays, 61 yards, 5:03
- (4:19) OU – Jalen Hurts 3 yard run, Gabe Brkic kick
  OU 34–20; 5 plays, 75 yards, 2:34
- (1:49) UT – Sam Ehlinger 4 yard run, Cameron Dicker kick
  OU 34–27; 10 plays, 75 yards, 2:30

Passing

- OU – Jalen Hurts 16/28, 235 YDS, 3 TD, 1 INT
- UT – Sam Ehlinger 26/38, 210 YDS

Rushing

- OU – Jalen Hurts 17 ATT, 131 YDS, 1 TD
- UT – Roschon Johnson 8 ATT, 95 YDS, 1 TD

Receiving

- OU – CeeDee Lamb 10 REC, 171 YDS, 3 TD
- UT – Collin Johnson 6 REC, 82 YDS

=== West Virginia ===
West Virginia Mountaineers vs No. 5 Oklahoma Sooners – Game summary

Quarter	1	2	3	4	Total
West Virginia	0	14	0	0	14
No. 5 Oklahoma	14	14	21	3	52

at Gaylord Family Oklahoma Memorial Stadium • Norman, Oklahoma

- Date: October 19, 2019
- Game time: 11:05 a.m. CDT
- Game weather: Temperature: 62 • Wind:N5-10 (MPH) • Weather: Sunny
- Game attendance: 82,620
- Referee: Scott Campbell
- TV announcers (FOX): Gus Johnson (play-by-play), Joel Klatt (analyst), Jenny Taft (sideline)

=== At Kansas State ===
No. 5 Oklahoma Sooners vs Kansas State Wildcats – Game summary

Quarter	1	2	3	4	Total
No. 5 Oklahoma	17	6	0	18	41
Kansas State	7	17	17	7	48

at Bill Snyder Family Stadium • Manhattan, Kansas

- Date: October 26, 2019
- Game time: 11:06 a.m. CDT
- Game weather: Temperature:44 • Wind:Calm (MPH) • Weather: Sunny
- Game attendance: 50,394
- Referee: Reggie Smith
- TV announcers (ABC): Bob Wischusen (play-by-play), Dan Orlovsky (analyst), Allison Williams (sideline)

Oklahoma traveled to Manhattan expecting a relatively easy road win but instead were pushed to what experts expected to be a critical loss for the Sooners in their hunt for the national title. The loss ended what was at the time the nation's longest road win streak.

Oklahoma's cornerback Parnell Motley was ejected from the game for unsportsmanlike conduct after kicking a Kansas State player. Kansas State's Eric Gallon forced a key fumble on a kick return but in process suffered a severe knee injury and he missed the rest of the game.

K-State's Skylar Thompson threw for 213 yards and ran for four touchdowns. Oklahoma nearly came back in the fourth quarter but the game concluded after an on-side kick for a 48–41 final score and Kansas State win.

=== Iowa State ===
Iowa State Cyclones vs No. 9 Oklahoma Sooners – Game summary

Quarter	1	2	3	4	Total
Iowa State	7	7	7	20	41
No. 9 Oklahoma	14	21	7	0	42

at Gaylord Family Oklahoma Memorial Stadium • Norman, Oklahoma

- Date: November 9, 2018
- Game time: 7:05 p.m. CST
- Game weather: Temperature:64 • Wind:5–10 S(MPH) • Weather: Clear
- Game attendance: 83,541
- Referee: Mike Defee
- TV announcers (FOX): Joe Davis (play-by-play), Brock Huard (analyst) & Bruce Feldman (sideline)

Both Iowa State and Oklahoma lost their previous games. Oklahoma could still be in the playoff chase by winning the remainder of their games and winning the Big 12 conference championship game. Predictions call that the Oklahoma Defense will need to slow the Cyclone offense to win the game. Coming into the game, it is listed as one of the most "compelling matchups" for the week by MSN Sports.

=== At Baylor ===
No. 10 Oklahoma Sooners vs No. 13 Baylor Bears – Game summary

Quarter	1	2	3	4	Total
No. 10 Oklahoma	3	7	7	17	34
No. 13 Baylor	14	17	0	0	31

at McLane Stadium • Waco, Texas

- Date: November 16, 2018
- Game time: 6:44 p.m. CST
- Game weather: Temperature:51 • Wind:SE 5–10(MPH) • Weather: Fair
- Game attendance: 50,223
- Referee: Cooper Castleberry
- TV announcers (ABC): Chris Fowler (play-by-play), Kirk Herbstreit (analyst) & Maria Taylor (sideline)

Game information

First quarter

- (09:25) OKLA FG – Gabe Brkic 39-yard field goal
  Oklahoma 3–0; Drive: 8 plays, 31 yards, 3:23
- (05:26) BAY TD – Charlie Brewer 2-yard rush, John Mayer kick
  Baylor 7–3; Drive: 10 plays, 78 yards, 3:59
- (01:51) BAY TD – Denzel Mims 30-yard pass from Charlie Brewer, John Mayer kick
  Baylor 14–3; Drive: 5 plays, 54 yards, 1:43

Second quarter

- (14:56) BAY TD – Charlie Brewer 4-yard rush, John Mayers kick
  Baylor 21–3; Drive: 2 plays, 27 yards, 0:05
- (11:02) BAY TD – Denzel Mims 9-yard pass from Charlie Brewer, John Mayers kick
  Baylor 28–3; Drive: 1 play, 9 yards, 0:07
- (05:06) OKLA TD – Austin Stogner 5-yard pass from Jalen Hurts, Gabe Brkic kick
  Baylor 28–10; Drive: 14 plays, 75 yards, 5:56
- (00:03) BAY FG – John Mayer 28-yard field goal
  Baylor 31–10; Drive: 14 plays, 61 yards, 5:03

Third quarter

- (09:16) OKLA TD – Austin Stogner 3-yard pass from Jalen Hurts, Gabe Brkic kick
  Baylor 31–17; Drive: 12 plays, 74 yards, 5:44

Fourth quarter

- (12:58) OKLA TD – Theo Wease 19-yard pass from Jalen Hurts, Gabe Brkic kick
  Baylor 31–24; Drive: 13 plays, 90 yards, 4:59
- (05:25) OKLA TD – Brayden Willis 2-yard pass from Jalen Hurts, Gabe Brkic kick
  Tied 31–31; Drive: 13 plays, 77 yards, 6:01
- (01:45) OKLA FG – Gabe Brkic 31-yard field goal
  Oklahoma 34–31; Drive: 9 plays, 59 yards, 2:30

Top passers

- OKLA – Jalen Hurts – 30/42, 297 yards, 4 TD, INT
- BAY – Charlie Brewer – 18/39, 194 yards, 2 TD, INT

Top rushers

- OKLA – Jalen Hurts – 27 carries, 114 yards
- BAY – Charlie Brewer – 17 carries, 65 yards, 2 TD

Top receivers

- OKLA – Lee Morris – 7 receptions, 86 yards
- BAY – Denzel Mims – 6 receptions, 92 yards, 2 TD

=== TCU ===
TCU Horned Frogs vs No. 9 Oklahoma Sooners – Game summary

Quarter	1	2	3	4	Total
TCU	0	10	7	7	24
No. 9 Oklahoma	14	7	7	0	28

at Gaylord Family Oklahoma Memorial Stadium • Norman, Oklahoma

- Date: November 23, 2019
- Game time: 7:05 p.m. CST
- Game weather: Temperature:39 • Wind:Calm (MPH) • Weather: Clear and cold
- Game attendance: 82,241
- Referee: Brandon Cruse
- TV announcers (FOX): Joe Davis (play-by-play), Brock Huard (analyst) & Bruce Feldman (sideline)

=== Oklahoma State ===
No. 7 Oklahoma Sooners vs No. 21 Oklahoma State Cowboys – Game summary

Quarter	1	2	3	4	Total
No.7 Oklahoma	10	10	7	7	34
No. 21 Oklahoma State	7	6	3	0	16

at Boone Pickens Stadium • Stillwater, Oklahoma

- Date: November 30, 2019
- Game time: 7:05 p.m. CST
- Game weather: Temperature:50 • Wind:WNW 7 (MPH) • Weather:Clear
- Game attendance: 54,575
- Referee: Reggie Smith
- TV announcers (FOX): Joe Davis (play-by-play), Brock Huard (analyst) & Bruce Feldman (sideline)

Game information

First Quarter

- (13:14) OKLA – Jalen Hurts 28-yard run, Gabe Brkic kick (Drive: 4 plays, 78 yards, 1:46; Oklahoma 7–0)
- (9:02) OKST – Chuba Hubbard 3-yard run, Matt Ammendola kick (Drive: 8 plays, 76 yards, 4:12; Tied 7–7)
- (3:00) OKLA – Gabe Brkic 42-yard field goal (Drive: 12 plays, 49 yards, 6:02; Oklahoma 10–7)

Second Quarter

- (14:54) OKLA – Jalen Hurts 4-yard pass from Nick Basquine, Gabe Brkic kick (Drive: 5 plays, 56 yards, 1:51; Oklahoma 17–7)
- (9:40) OKST – Matt Ammendola 43-yard field goal (Drive: 13 plays, 49 yards, 5:14; Oklahoma 17–10)
- (5:06) OKLA – Gabe Brkic 27-yard field goal (Drive: 9 plays, 65 yards, 4:34; Oklahoma 20–10)
- (0:00) OKST – Matt Ammendola 25-yard field goal (Drive: 13 plays, 77 yards, 5:06; Oklahoma 20–13)

Third Quarter

- (9:41) OKST – Matt Ammendola 26-yard field goal (Drive: 6 plays, 49 yards, 2:16; Oklahoma 20–16)
- (3:22) OKLA – Kennedy Brooks 3-yard run, Gabe Brkic kick (Drive: 11 plays, 93 yards, 6:19; Oklahoma 27–16)

Fourth Quarter

- (10:21) OKLA – Brayden Willis 3-yard pass from Jalen Hurts, Gabe Brkic kick (Drive: 11 plays, 73 yards, 5:45; Oklahoma 34–16)

Top passers

- OKLA – Jalen Hurts – 13/16, 163 yards, TD
- OKST – Dru Brown – 22/32, 207 yards, INT

Top rushers

- OKLA – Kennedy Brooks – 22 carries, 160 yards, TD
- OKST – Chuba Hubbard – 24 carries, 104 yards, TD

Top receivers

- OKLA – CeeDee Lamb – 4 receptions, 36 yards
- OKST – Braydon Johnson – 4 receptions, 77 yards

=== Vs. Baylor (Big 12 Championship game) ===
No. 7 Baylor Bears vs No. 6 Oklahoma Sooners – Game summary

Quarter	1	2	3	4	OT	Total
No. 7 Baylor	0	13	0	10	0	23
No. 6 Oklahoma	10	0	10	3	7	30

at AT&T Stadium • Arlington, Texas

- Date: December 7, 2019
- Game time: 11:00 a.m. CST
- Game weather: Indoors
- Game attendance: 65,191
- Referee: Mike Defee
- TV announcers (ABC): Sean McDonough (play-by-play), Todd Blackledge (analyst), Holly Rowe (reporter)

Game information

First Quarter

- (9:31) OKLA – Kennedy Brooks 6 yard rush, Gabe Brkic kick (Drive: 3 plays, 78 yards, 1:21; Oklahoma 7–0)
- (4:51) OKLA – Gabe Brkic 44 yard field goal (Drive: 7 plays, 34 yards, 3:06; Oklahoma 10–0)

Second Quarter

- (10:20) BAY – John Mayers 44 yard field goal (Drive: 4 plays, 3 yards, 1:25; Oklahoma 10–3)
- (2:59) BAY – Gerry Bohanon 33 yard pass to Tyquan Thornton, John Mayers kick (Drive: 3 plays, 23 yards, 0:59; Tied 10–10)
- (0:08) BAY – John Mayers 28 yard field goal (Drive: 9 plays, 42 yards, 1:14; Baylor 13–10)

Third Quarter

- (7:53) OKLA – Gabe Brkic 24 yard field goal (Drive: 11 plays, 63 yards, 5:39; Tied 13–13)
- (3:09) OKLA – Jalen Hurts 18 yard pass to Nick Basquine, Gabe Brkic kick (Drive: 8 plays, 74 yards, 3:46; Oklahoma 20–13)

Fourth Quarter

- (10:31) OKLA – Gabe Brkic 24 yard field goal (Drive: 10 plays, 43 yards, 4:43; Oklahoma 23–13)
- (9:41) BAY – Jacob Zeno 81 yard pass to Trestan Ebner, John Mayers kick (Drive: 2 plays, 75 yards, 0:50; Oklahoma 23–20)
- (3:25) BAY – John Mayers 27 yard field goal (Drive: 5 plays, 80 yards, 2:46; Tied 23–23)

Overtime

- (–) OKLA – Rhamondre Stevenson 5 yard rush, Gabe Brkic kick (Drive: 3 plays, 25 yards, Oklahoma 30–23)

Top passers

- BAY – Jacob Zeno – 2/6, 159 yards, TD
- OKLA – Jalen Hurts – 17/24, 287 yards, TD, INT

Top rushers

- BAY – John Lovett – 3 carries, 19 yards
- OKLA – Kennedy Brooks – 17 carries, 59 yards, TD

Top receivers

- BAY – Trestan Ebner – 2 receptions, 84 yards, TD
- OKLA – CeeDee Lamb – 8 receptions, 173 yards

=== Vs. LSU (Peach Bowl) ===
No. 4 Oklahoma Sooners vs No. 1 LSU Tigers – Game summary

Quarter	1	2	3	4	Total
No. 4 Oklahoma	7	7	7	7	28
No. 1 LSU	21	28	7	7	63

at Mercedes-Benz Stadium • Atlanta, Georgia

- Date: December 28, 2019
- Game time: 3:20 p.m. CST
- Game weather: Indoors (roof closed)
- Game attendance: 78,347
- Referee: Stuart Mullins
- TV announcers (ESPN): Sean McDonough (play-by-play), Todd Blackledge (analyst), Holly Rowe and Laura Rutledge (sideline)

Game information

First Quarter

- (12:03) LSU – Joe Burrow 19 yard pass to Justin Jefferson, Cade York kick (Drive: 3 plays, 42 yards, 0:52; LSU 7–0)
- (7:34) OKLA – Kennedy Brooks 3 yard rush, Gabe Brkic kick (Drive: 5 plays, 69 yards, 2:21; Tied 7–7)
- (4:24) LSU – Joe Burrow 8 yard pass to Terrace Marshall Jr., Cade York kick (Drive: 9 plays, 75 yards, 2:59; LSU 14–7)
- (1:16) LSU – Joe Burrow 35 yard pass to Justin Jefferson, Cade York kick (Drive: 6 plays, 86 yards, 2:31; LSU 21–7)

Second Quarter

- (12:13) LSU – Joe Burrow 42 yard pass to Justin Jefferson, Cade York kick (Drive: 6 plays, 80 yards, 2:02; LSU 28–7)
- (9:17) LSU – Joe Burrow 30 yard pass to Justin Jefferson, Cade York kick (Drive: 6 plays, 55 yards, 2:46; LSU 35–7)
- (4:45) OKLA – Jalen Hurts 2 yard rush, Gabe Brkic kick (Drive: 10 plays, 75 yards, 4:32; LSU 35–14)
- (4:18) LSU – Joe Burrow 62 yard pass to Thaddeus Moss, Cade York kick (Drive: 2 plays, 75 yards, 0:27; LSU 42–14)
- (0:50) LSU – Joe Burrow 2 yard pass to Terrace Marshall Jr., Cade York kick (Drive: 5 plays, 63 yards, 2:04; LSU 49–14)

Third Quarter

- (10:11) LSU – Joe Burrow 3 yard rush, Cade York kick (Drive: 13 plays, 74 yards, 4:40; LSU 56–14)
- (4:19) OKLA – Jalen Hurts 12 yard rush, Gabe Brkic kick (Drive: 13 plays, 75 yards, 5:52; LSU 56–21)

Fourth Quarter

- (9:39) OKLA – T.J. Pledger 1 yard rush, Gabe Brkic kick (Drive: 9 plays, 71 yards, 4:27; LSU 56–28)
- (3:59) LSU – John Emery Jr. 6 yard rush, Cade York kick (Drive: 9 plays, 75 yards, 5:40; LSU 63–28)

Top passers

- OKLA – Jalen Hurts – 15/31, 217 yards, INT
- LSU – Joe Burrow – 29/39, 493 yards, 7 TD

Top rushers

- OKLA – Jalen Hurts – 14 rushes, 43 yards, 2 TD
- LSU – Chris Curry – 16 rushes, 90 yards

Top receivers

- OKLA – CeeDee Lamb – 4 receptions, 119 yards
- LSU – Justin Jefferson – 14 receptions, 227 yards, 4 TD

== Statistics ==
=== Team ===
Team Statistics
	Oklahoma	Opponents
Points		
First Downs		
Rushing		
Passing		
Penalty		
Rushing Yards		
Rushing Attempts		
Average Per Rush		
Long		
Rushing TDs		
Passing yards		
Comp–Att		
Comp %		
Average Per Game		
Average per Attempt		
Passing TDs		
INT's		
Rating		
Touchdowns		
Passing		
Rushing		
Defensive		
Interceptions		
Yards		
Long		
Total Offense		
Total Plays		
Average Per Yards/Game		
Kick Returns: # – Yards		
TDs		
Long		
Punts		
Yards		
Average		
Punt Returns: # – Yards		
TDs		
Long		
Fumbles – Fumbles Lost		
Opposing TD's		
Penalties – Yards		
3rd–Down Conversion %		
4th–Down Conversion %		
Takeaways		
Field Goals		
Extra Point		
Sacks		
Sack Against		
Yards		

=== Offense ===
Passing Statistics
#	NAME	POS	RAT	CMP	ATT	YDS	CMP%	TD	INT
		QB							
	Totals								

Rushing Statistics
#	NAME	POS	CAR	YDS	LONG	TD	YPC
		RB					
	TOTALS						

Receiving Statistics
#	NAME	POS	REC	YDS	LONG	TD	AVG
		WR					
	TOTALS						

=== Defense ===
Defensive Statistics
#	NAME	POS	SOLO	AST	TOT	TFL	SACKS	INT-YDS	PD	FR	FF
			0	0	0	0	0	0–0	0	0	0
	TOTAL		0	0	0	0	0	0–0	0	0	0
	OPPONENTS		0	0	0	0	0	0	0	0	0

Key: POS: Position, SOLO: Solo Tackles, AST: Assisted Tackles, TOT: Total Tackles, TFL: Tackles-for-loss, SACK: Quarterback Sacks, INT: Interceptions, PD: Passes Defended, FF: Forced Fumbles, FR: Fumbles Recovered, BLK: Kicks or Punts Blocked, SAF: Safeties

Interceptions Statistics
#	NAME	POS	INT	YDS	AVG	TD	LNG
				0	0.0	0	0
	TOTALS						

=== Special teams ===
Kicking statistics
#	NAME	XPM	XPA	XP%	FGM	FGA	FG%	1–19	20–29	30–39	40–49	50+	LNG	BLK	PTS
								0/0				0/0			
	TOTALS											0/0			

Kick return statistics
#	NAME	POS	RTNS	YDS	AVG	TD	LNG
	TOTALS						

Punting statistics
#	NAME	POS	PUNTS	YDS	AVG	LONG
		P				
	TOTALS					

Punt return statistics
#	NAME	POS	RTNS	YDS	AVG	TD	LONG
	TOTALS						

== Scoring ==
=== Scores by quarter (non-conference opponents) ===
	1	2	3	4	Total
All opponents	0	17	28	14	59
Oklahoma	38	45	56	28	167

=== Scores by quarter (Big 12 opponents) ===
	1	2	3	4	Total
Big 12 opponents	7	27	20	23	77
Oklahoma	45	48	59	34	186

=== Scores by quarter (All opponents) ===
	1	2	3	4	Total
All opponents	7	44	48	37	136
Oklahoma	83	93	115	62	353

== Rankings ==
Ranking movements Legend: ██ Increase in ranking ██ Decrease in ranking
	Week																
Poll	Pre	1	2	3	4	5	6	7	8	9	10	11	12	13	14	15	Final
AP	4	4	5	5	6	6	6	5	5	10	9	10	8	7	6	4	7
Coaches	4	4	4	4	4	4	5	5	5	9	8	8	7	7	6	4	6
CFP	Not released										9	10	9	7	6	4	Not released

== Awards and honors ==
Weekly Awards
Player	Position	Date	Ref.
Jalen Hurts (Big 12 Offensive Player/Newcomer of the Week)	QB	September 3, 2019	
Brendan Radley-Haines (Big 12 Defensive Player of the Week)	CB	September 9, 2019	
Jalen Hurts (Big 12 Newcomer of the Week)	QB	September 30, 2019	
CeeDee Lamb (Big 12 Offensive Player of the Week)	WR	October 14, 2019	
Kenneth Murray (Big 12 Defensive of the Week)	LB	October 14, 2019	
Jalen Hurts (2x Big 12 Newcomer of the Week)	QB	October 14, 2019	
Jalen Hurts (2x Big 12 Offensive Player of the Week)	QB	October 21, 2019	
CeeDee Lamb (2x Big 12 Offensive Player of the Week)	WR	November 11, 2019	
Jalen Hurts (3x Big 12 Offensive Player of the Week)	QB	November 18, 2019	

Individual Awards
Player	Position	Award	Ref.
Creed Humphrey	OL	Big 12 Offensive Lineman Player of the Year	
Jalen Hurts	QB	Big 12 Offensive Newcomer Player of the Year	
LaRon Stokes	DL	Big 12 Defensive Newcomer Player of the Year	

All-American
Player	AP	AFCA	FWAA	TSN	WCFF	Designation
The NCAA recognizes a selection to all five of the AP, AFCA, FWAA, TSN and WCFF first teams for unanimous selections and three of five for consensus selections. HM = Honorable mention. Source:

All-Big 12
Player	Position	Class
Creed Humphrey	OL	Sophomore
Jalen Hurts	QB	Graduate Student
CeeDee Lamb	WR	Junior
Kenneth Murray	LB	Junior
Adrian Ealy	OL	Sophomore
Kennedy Brooks	RB	Sophomore
Jeremiah Hall	WR	Sophomore
Parnell Motley	DB	Senior
Neville Gallimore	DL	Senior
Ronnie Perkins	DL	Sophomore
Gabe Brkic	PK	Freshman
Pat Fields (HM)	DB	Sophomore
Reeves Mundschau (HM)	P	Freshman
Jalen Redmond (HM)	DL	Sophomore
Delarrin Turner-Yell (HM)	DB	Sophomore
DaShaun White (HM)	LB	Sophomore
HM = Honorable mention. Source:

All-Big 12 Academic
Player	Position	Class	Major	Ref.
HM = Honorable mention. Source:

== 2020 NFL draft ==
The 2020 NFL draft was held on April 23–25, 2020 in Paradise, Nevada.

Round	Pick	Player	Position	NFL team
1	17	CeeDee Lamb	WR	Dallas Cowboys
1	23	Kenneth Murray	ILB	Los Angeles Chargers
2	53	Jalen Hurts	QB	Philadelphia Eagles
3	82	Neville Gallimore	DT	Dallas Cowboys
