= Notley =

Notley may refer to:

People

- Alice Notley (1945–2025), American poet
- Bernarr Notley (1918–2019), English cricketer
- Bruce Notley-Smith (born 1964), Australian politician, Councillor and former Mayor of the City of Randwick
- Charles Notley (1879–1968), British fencer
- Frederick Notley Bartram (1869–1948), New Zealand Member of Parliament for Grey Lynn in Auckland
- Grant Notley (1939–1984), Canadian politician in Alberta
- Rachel Notley (born 1964), Canadian politician, 17th Premier of Alberta, daughter of Grant Notley
- Thomas Notley, the 8th Proprietary Governor of Maryland from 1676 through 1679

Places

- Black Notley, village and civil parish in Essex, England
- Dunvegan-Central Peace-Notley, provincial electoral district in northern Alberta, Canada
- Great Notley, suburban development on the fringe of Braintree, Essex
- Notley Abbey within Aylesbury Vale district in Buckinghamshire, England
- Notley High School, in Braintree in Essex, England
- Notley's Landing, a dog-hole port in Big Sur, California
- White Notley, parish in Essex, England
- White Notley railway station serves the village of White Notley, in Essex, England

== See also ==
- Motley (disambiguation)
- Mottley (disambiguation)
- Nottle (disambiguation)
- Nutley (disambiguation)
