= University College Cork Students' Union =

Students' union at University College Cork

- Motto: Your Voice, Your Union
- Institution: University College Cork
- Location: 54 College Road, University College, Cork
- Established: 1973
- Affiliations: Aontas na Mac Léinn in Éirinn
- Website: www.uccsu.ie

University College Cork Students' Union (UCCSU) is a students' union in University College Cork (UCC), in Cork, Ireland. It was established in 1973 following the charter, statutes and regulations of the governing body of the college as a representative body for UCC students. Each UCC student is automatically a member by virtue of a student levy.

The main functions of union are to provide academic assistance to students, to provide support to students in need, to lobby the university and the government on issues affecting students, and to provide entertainment on campus. The student council of the UCCSU also acts as the student parliament for UCC, and represents students on a number of committees including UCC's Governing Authority, Academic Council, and externally in the national union of students, Aontas na Mac Léinn in Éirinn.

== History ==
The union was established in 1973 to "represent and support their members at every level within the university". The union replaced a previous body known as the 'Students' Representative Council'. This body (known in Irish as Comhairle Teachta na Mac Léinn CTM) was established around 1908. In its early years, all officers of the body served in a voluntary capacity. The first full-time officer came with the introduction of a paid presidency role in 1940, and increased to four full-time officers in 2004.

Since 2010, the union has awarded Honorary Life Memberships, to "individuals that have demonstrated commitment to working in the best interests of students both within the University and externally".

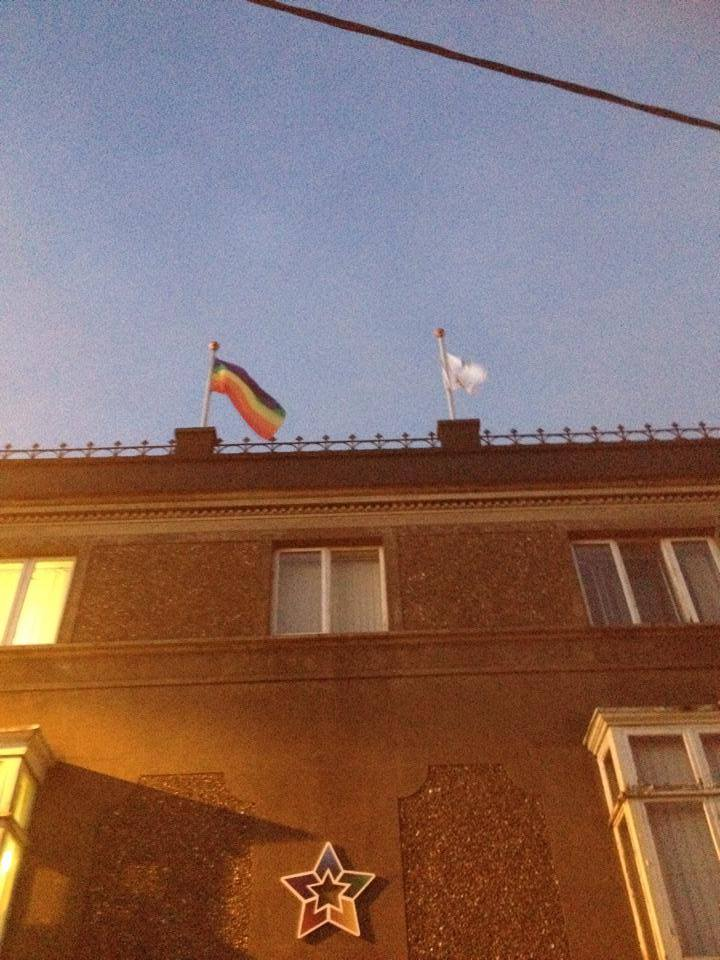
The Pride flag flown atop the UCC Students' Union building

On 5 December 2014, the union became the first third-level institution on the island of Ireland to install a permanent Pride flag on campus.

== Finances ==
The union oversees the distribution of the UCC student capitation fee, a fee collected from all students by the university on behalf of the union every year. The money collected from this fee is assigned to various union activities and aspects of student life, including access to the Mardyke sports facilities, student mental health services, maintenance of union-operated common rooms, funding for the student media executive and affiliation to Aontas na Mac Léinn in Éirinn, the national students' union of Ireland.

== Publications ==
While the union does not operate any former publications itself, it is partially responsible for overseeing the student media publications of UCC, via the student media executive, an anonymous sub-committee of the union, which funds The University Express newspaper, UCC 98.3 FM radio station and Motley Magazine. Funds for these publications are sourced from a capitation fee which is collected by the university on behalf of the union every year from all students.

== Organisation ==
UCCSU's executive is elected by the student body.

As of 2022, there were six full-time sabbatical officers, including the roles of President, Communications and Engagement Officer, Education Officer, Welfare Officer, Commercial and Fundraising Officer, and Entertainments Officer.

There are also a number of part-time officer (voluntary) positions which are divided into three types - College Representatives, Campaign Representatives and Special Representatives. College Representatives represent the four colleges within University College Cork. The Campaign Representatives are made up of: Environmental & Sustainability Representative, Equality & Diversity Representative and Irish Language & Cultural Representative. Special Representatives include both voluntary representatives advocating for a specific student cohort (international, postgraduate, mature), and the Clubs and Societies Presidents, who are elected by their respective organisations.

== Services ==
Services provided to students by the union include a jobs portal, education advice and grinds, welfare advice, and free sexual health products. It is also involved in charity and fundraising, advocacy and community relations, and campaigning on other issues.
