= Motley (surname) =

Motley is a surname which may refer to:

- Archibald Motley (1891–1981), African-American painter
- Arthur Harrison Motley (1900–1984), American publisher
- Arthur Motley (1858–1897), English cricketer
- Constance Baker Motley (1921–2005), African-American civil rights activist, lawyer, judge, state senator and Manhattan Borough President
- Darryl Motley (born 1960), American Major League Baseball player
- Eric Motley (born 1972), African-American bureaucrat
- Fannie E. Motley (1927–2016), first African-American to graduate from Spring Hill College in Mobile, Alabama
- Geof Motley (1935–2023), Australian rules football player and coach
- James Motley (1822–1859), English engineer and naturalist
- John Lothrop Motley (1814–1877), American historian
- Johnathan Motley (born 1995), American basketball player
- Marion Motley (1920–1999), American National Football League player
- Parnell Motley (born 1997), American football player
- Peter Motley (born 1964), former Australian rules football player
- Ronald Motley (1944–2013), American trial attorney

== See also ==
- Motley (disambiguation)
