= Motley (disambiguation) =

Motley is the traditional costume of the court jester. The word can also refer to the following:

== People ==
- Motley (surname)

== Places ==
In the United States

- Motley, Minnesota, a city
- Motley Township, Morrison County, Minnesota
- Motley County, Texas
- Motley, Virginia, a census-designated place

In Australia

- Motley, Queensland, a locality in the Toowoomba Region

== Other uses ==
- Mötley Crüe, an American glam metal band.
- The Motleys, a family in the comic strip Motley's Crew
- The Motley Fool, financial information and advisory service
- Motley Magazine, a student magazine published in University College Cork
- Mötley Records, record label
- Motley Theatre Design Group aka Motley, a theatre design firm that existed from 1932 to 1976
  - Motley Theatre Design Course, a theatre design course in London founded in 1966

== See also ==
- Mottley
