= 1945–46 Heart of Midlothian F.C. season =

Heart of Midlothian
1945–46 season
- Manager: David McLean
- Stadium: Tynecastle Park
- Southern League First Division: 6th
- Victory Cup: Round 2
- Southern League Cup: Semi-final
Home colours

During the 1945–46 season, Hearts competed in the Southern League First Division, the Victory Cup, the Southern League Cup and the East of Scotland Shield.

== Fixtures ==
=== Friendlies ===
2 June 1946 Friendly	British Army of the Rhine	2–3	Hearts	Highbury Stadium, Celle, Germany
	Goal

=== East of Scotland Shield ===
11 May 1946 Final	Hearts	3–2	Hibernian	Tynecastle Park

=== Wilson Cup ===
15 August 1945 Final	Hibernian	1–4	Hearts	Easter Road

=== Southern League Cup ===
23 February 1946 Southern League Cup Group	Hamilton Academical	3–2	Hearts	Douglas Park

2 March 1946 Southern League Cup Group	Hearts	3–1	Falkirk	Tynecastle Park

9 March 1946 Southern League Cup Group	Hearts	3–1	St Mirren	Tynecastle Park

16 March 1946 Southern League Cup Group	Hearts	1–0	Hamilton Academical	Tynecastle Park

23 March 1946 Southern League Cup Group	Falkirk	2–2	Hearts	Brockville Park
				Attendance: 20,000

30 March 1946 Southern League Cup Group	St Mirren	1–1	Hearts	St Mirren Park, Love Street

6 April 1946 Southern League Cup Quarter-Final	Hearts	3–0	East Fife	Tynecastle Park

27 April 1946 Southern League Cup Semi-Final	Hearts	1–2	Rangers	Hampden Park
				Attendance: 70,000

=== Victory Cup ===
20 April 1946 Victory Cup R1 1st Leg	Alloa Athletic	3–1	Hearts	Recreation Park

24 April 1946 Victory Cup R1 2nd Leg	Hearts	5–0	Alloa Athletic	Tynecastle Park

4 May 1946 Victory Cup R2	Hearts	1–3	Hibernian	Tynecastle Park

=== Southern League First Division ===
11 August 1945 Southern League First Division	Hearts	4–1	Falkirk	Tynecastle Park

18 August 1945 Southern League First Division	Partick Thistle	1–3	Hearts	Firhill Park

25 August 1945 Southern League First Division	Hearts	0–0	Motherwell	Tynecastle Park
				Attendance: 25,000

1 September 1945 Southern League First Division	Third Lanark	1–2	Hearts	Cathkin Park
				Attendance: 8,000

8 September 1945 Southern League First Division	Hearts	0–2	Hibernian	Tynecastle Park
				Attendance: 40,000

15 September 1945 Southern League First Division	St Mirren	3–1	Hearts	St Mirren Park, Love Street

22 September 1945 Southern League First Division	Hearts	2–2	Celtic	Tynecastle Park
				Attendance: 14,000

29 September 1945 Southern League First Division	Kilmarnock	2–2	Hearts	Rugby Park

6 October 1945 Southern League First Division	Hearts	6–0	Morton	Tynecastle Park

13 October 1945 Southern League First Division	Hearts	4–1	Hamilton Academical	Tynecastle Park

20 October 1945 Southern League First Division	Queen of the South	3–3	Hearts	Palmerston Park

27 October 1945 Southern League First Division	Hearts	3–3	Queen's Park	Tynecastle Park

3 November 1945 Southern League First Division	Clyde	3–1	Hearts	Shawfield Stadium
				Attendance: 15,000

10 November 1945 Southern League First Division	Hearts	1–2	Aberdeen	Tynecastle Park
				Attendance: 18,000

17 November 1945 Southern League First Division	Rangers	1–1	Hearts	Ibrox Park
				Attendance: 16,000

24 November 1945 Southern League First Division	Falkirk	3–5	Hearts	Brockville Park

1 December 1945 Southern League First Division	Hearts	4–1	Partick Thistle	Tynecastle Park
				Attendance: 16,000

8 December 1945 Southern League First Division	Motherwell	5–4	Hearts	Fir Park
				Attendance: 6,000

15 December 1945 Southern League First Division	Hearts	2–1	Third Lanark	Tynecastle Park
				Attendance: 7,000

22 December 1945 Southern League First Division	Hearts	2–2	St Mirren	Tynecastle Park

29 December 1946 Southern League First Division	Celtic	3–5	Hearts	Celtic Park
				Attendance: 15,000

1 January 1946 Southern League First Division	Hibernian	1–0	Hearts	Easter Road
				Attendance: 30,000

2 January 1946 Southern League First Division	Hearts	1–4	Kilmarnock	Tynecastle Park
				Attendance: 15,000

5 January 1946 Southern League First Division	Morton	4–2	Hearts	Cappielow Park

12 January 1946 Southern League First Division	Hamilton Academical	2–0	Hearts	Douglas Park
				Attendance: 4,000

26 January 1946 Southern League First Division	Queen's Park	0–1	Hearts	Hampden Park
				Attendance: 10,000

2 February 1946 Southern League First Division	Hearts	1–1	Clyde	Tynecastle Park

9 February 1946 Southern League First Division	Aberdeen	2–1	Hearts	Pittodrie Park
				Attendance: 15,000

16 February 1946 Southern League First Division	Hearts	2–0	Rangers	Tynecastle Park
				Attendance: 36,177

15 April 1946 Southern League First Division	Hearts	0–3	Queen of the South	Tynecastle Park
				Attendance: 10,000

== See also ==
- List of Heart of Midlothian F.C. seasons
