= Nutley =

Nutley may refer to:

== People ==
- Ben Nutley (born 1992), English rugby union player
- Bobby Nutley (1916–1996), Scottish football (soccer) player
- Colin Nutley (born 1944), English director
- Danny Nutley (born 1974), Australian former rugby league footballer
- Molly Nutley (born 1995), Swedish actress
- Richard Nutley (1670–1729), Irish judge
- Zara Nutley (1926–2016), British television actress

== Places ==
=== England ===
- Nutley, East Sussex, a village
  - Nutley Windmill, in the above village
- Nutley, Hampshire, a village and civil parish

=== United States ===
- Nutley, New Jersey, a township in the United States
  - Nutley Public Schools, a public school district in the above township
    - Nutley High School, in the above school district
- Nutley Street, a road in Fairfax County, Virginia
