= Motlow =

Motlow may refer to

- Motlow State Community College, a junior college begun in Moore County, Tennessee
- Motlow Tunnel, a passageway in the Tennessee State Capitol
- J. Reagor Motlow (1898–1978), American businessman and politician
- Lem Motlow (1869–1947), American businessman and politician
- Tom Motlow, 1900–01 basketball player for the Vanderbilt University Commodores
