= Bobby Nutley =

Scottish footballer

Bobby Nutley (10 September 1916 – 14 July 1996) was a Scottish footballer, who played for Blantyre Victoria, Hibernian, Portsmouth and Queen of the South.

In the late 1930s, Nutley was the regular left winger for Hibs. He represented the Scottish League once, in 1939. His football career was then interrupted by the Second World War. After making just one league appearance for Hibs after the end of the war, Nutley played in the Football League for Portsmouth. He then returned to Scotland and had a short spell with Dumfries club Queen of the South.
