= Nottle =

Nottle may refer to:

- Ed Nottle, minor league baseball relief pitcher and manager
- Gussie Fink-Nottle, fictional character in the Jeeves novels
