= Motley Magazine =

- A vibrant, diverse and eclectic eye on UCC and beyond
- September 2018 cover of Motley Magazine
- Type: Monthly Magazine
- Format: A4
- School: University College Cork
- Founder: Ian Power
- Editor: Lisa Ahern
- Staff writers: 15
- Founded: 2006
- Ceased publication: 2009
- Relaunched: 2010
- Language: English
- Headquarters: The Newsroom, Ground Floor, The Hub, University College Cork, Cork, Ireland
- City: Cork
- Country: Ireland
- Circulation: 1,500 (as of 2017)
- Readership: 20,000+ (Print and Online)
- Website: www.motley.ie

Motley Magazine is an Irish student publication affiliated with University College Cork (UCC). Motley Magazine was originally set up in 2006 by the UCC Journalism and Media Society (now extinct, relaunched in 2018 as the UCC Journalism Society) until it became an official publication of the UCC media executive. Motley Magazine is published monthly during college term since its founding, except for a one-year break during the 2009/2010 academic year. It is a free publication, distributed throughout the University College Cork campus.

The magazine won the "Best Magazine" award at the SMEDIA Awards in 2014, 2015, 2016, and 2017. Since it was created, the magazine has featured interviews and articles on people from the television, music and pop-culture industries, such as Troye Sivan, Amanda Palmer, and the Kaiser Chiefs.

== Editors ==
Academic Year	Volume	Editor-in-Chief	Designer	Comments
2006/2007	Volume I	Ian Power	N/A	Founding
2007/2008	Volume II	Ian Power	N/A	
2008/2009	Volume III	N/A	N/A	
2009/2010	No Volume	N/A	N/A	Sabbatical
2010/2011	Volume IV	Aisling Twomey	Muire O'Hara	
2011/2012	Volume V	Kevin Curran	Richard Sheehy	
2012/2013	Volume VI	John Murphy	Richard Sheehy	
2013/2014	Volume VII	Kieran Murphy	Luke Crowley-Holland	
2014/2015	Volume VIII	Ellen Desmond	Luke Crowley-Holland/Cathal O'Gara	
2015/2016	Volume IX	Ellen Desmond	Cathal O'Gara	
2016/2017	Volume X	Eoin McSweeney	Colm Cahalane	
2017/2018	Volume XI	Lauren Mulvihill	Sai Wing Ho	
2018/2019	Volume XII	Lucas Brun	Emily Phipps	
2019/2020	Volume XIII	Dan Webb	Tim Caruso	
2020/2021	Volume XIV	Matthew Moynihan	Hilary Barry	
2021/2022	Volume XV	Emer Walsh	Maxwell Callanan	
2022/2023	Volume XVI	Niamh Browne	Kevin Smith	
2023/2024	Volume XVII	Ronan Keohane	Owen Mamo	
2025/2026	Volume XVIII	Lisa Ahern	Ester Evangelista de Alcantara	

== Notable people who have appeared in Motley Magazine ==
Notable people, who have appeared in the magazine, include:

- Cast of The Real Housewives of Beverly Hills
- Cast of Orange Is The New Black
- Cast of Game of Thrones
- Cast of Jersey Shore
- Cast of Dance Moms
- Cast of RuPaul's Drag Race
- Cast of Love/Hate
- Le Galaxie
- Little Green Cars
- Tove Lo
- Calum Scott
- Max Jury
- Tyler Oakley
- Troye Sivan
- Amanda Palmer
- The Veronicas
- Róisín O
- Enemies
- Walking on Cars
- Mick Flannery
- Heathers
- Kodaline
- Jarryd James
- The Riptide Movement
- Ella Henderson
- Kaiser Chiefs
- Daithí
- George Hook
- Fiona Shaw
- Robert Sheehan
- Rick Riordan
- Wolf Alice

== Awards ==
- KBC Student Magazine 2014
- KBC Student Magazine 2015
- People's Choice Award 2015 (SMEDIA)
- KBC Student Magazine 2016
- People's Choice Award 2016
