= Delarrin Turner-Yell =

American football player (born 1999)

No. 32 – Atlanta Falcons
- Position: Safety
- Roster status: Practice squad

Personal information
- Born: December 16, 1999 (age 26); Hempstead, Texas, U.S.
- Listed height: 5 ft 11 in (1.80 m)
- Listed weight: 200 lb (91 kg)

Career information
- High school: Hempstead
- College: Oklahoma (2018–2021)
- NFL draft: 2022: 5th round, 152nd overall pick

Career history
- Denver Broncos (2022–2025); Atlanta Falcons (2026–present)*
- * Offseason or practice squad member only

Awards and highlights
- Second-team All-Big 12 (2021)

Career NFL statistics as of 2024
- Total tackles: 42
- Fumble recoveries: 2
- Pass deflections: 1
- Stats at Pro Football Reference

Delarrin Turner-Yell (DUH-lare-EE-in; born December 16, 1999) is an American professional football safety for the Atlanta Falcons of the National Football League (NFL). He played college football for the Oklahoma Sooners and was selected by the Denver Broncos in the fifth round of the 2022 NFL draft.

== College career ==
Turner-Yell was ranked as a three-star recruit by 247Sports.com coming out of high school. He committed to Oklahoma on August 26, 2017, over offers from Baylor, Houston, and Iowa.

== Professional career ==
Pre-draft measurables
Height	Weight	Arm length	Hand span	Wingspan	40-yard dash	10-yard split	20-yard split	Broad jump
5 ft 10 1/4 in (1.78 m)	197 lb (89 kg)	31 3/4 in (0.81 m)	10 in (0.25 m)	6 ft 4 1/4 in (1.94 m)	4.47 s	1.55 s	2.61 s	10 ft 2 in (3.10 m)
All values from NFL Combine

=== Denver Broncos ===
Turner-Yell was drafted by the Denver Broncos in the fifth round, 152nd overall, of the 2022 NFL draft. As a rookie, he appeared in 14 games and had two fumble recoveries.

After suffering an ACL tear during Week 17 of the 2023 season against the Los Angeles Chargers, Turner-Yell was placed on injured reserve on January 4, 2024. He entered the 2024 season on the physically unable to perform list, and would end up missing the entire season.

On August 26, 2025, Turner-Yell was waived by the Broncos. The next day, he was re-signed to the practice squad. Turner-Yell was elevated to active roster for Week 16, but suffered a knee injury during the game and was later placed on the practice squad/injured list.

=== Atlanta Falcons ===
On November 10, 2026, Turner-Yell was signed to the Atlanta Falcons practice squad.
