= Tre Brown =

American football player (born 1997)

Profile
- Position: Cornerback

Personal information
- Born: September 24, 1997 (age 29); Tulsa, Oklahoma, U.S.
- Listed height: 5 ft 10 in (1.78 m)
- Listed weight: 186 lb (84 kg)

Career information
- High school: Union (Tulsa)
- College: Oklahoma (2017–2020)
- NFL draft: 2021: 4th round, 137th overall pick

Career history
- Seattle Seahawks (2021–2024); San Francisco 49ers (2025)*; Los Angeles Rams (2025); New York Jets (2025–2026)
- * Offseason or practice squad member only

Awards and highlights
- 2× Second-team All-Big 12 (2018, 2020)

Career NFL statistics as of 2025
- Total tackles: 82
- Sacks: 1
- Forced fumbles: 2
- Pass deflections: 8
- Interceptions: 2
- Defensive touchdowns: 1
- Stats at Pro Football Reference

Reginald "Tre" Brown (born September 24, 1997) is an American professional football cornerback. He played college football for the Oklahoma Sooners.

== Early life ==
Brown was born as Reginald Brown and raised in Tulsa, Oklahoma, where he attended Union High School. He committed to play cornerback at Oklahoma over schools such as LSU, Florida, USC, and Texas.

== Professional career ==
Pre-draft measurables
Height	Weight	Arm length	Hand span	Wingspan	40-yard dash	10-yard split	20-yard split	20-yard shuttle	Three-cone drill	Vertical jump	Broad jump	Bench press
5 ft 9 3/4 in (1.77 m)	185 lb (84 kg)	30 3/8 in (0.77 m)	9 1/2 in (0.24 m)	6 ft 3 1/2 in (1.92 m)	4.42 s	1.58 s	2.55 s	4.27 s	7.11 s	38.0 in (0.97 m)	10 ft 3 in (3.12 m)	13 reps
All values from Pro Day

=== Seattle Seahawks ===
On May 1, 2021, Brown was selected by the Seattle Seahawks in the fourth round of the 2021 NFL draft with the 137th overall pick. On May 21, after the rookie mini camp, Seahawks signed Brown to a four–year contract worth $4.1 million with a $640K signing bonus. Brown was placed on injured reserve on September 7, with a knee sprain. He was activated on October 15. Brown suffered a knee injury in Week 11 and was placed on season-ending injured reserve on November 27.

Brown was placed on the Active/physically unable to perform list on July 26, 2022. He was placed on the reserve list to start the season on August 28. Brown was activated on November 15.

=== San Francisco 49ers ===
On March 12, 2025, Brown signed with the San Francisco 49ers. On August 21, Brown was placed on injured reserve, and later released.

=== Los Angeles Rams ===
On September 16, 2025, Brown signed with the Los Angeles Rams. He was waived by Los Angeles on October 28.

=== New York Jets ===
On November 11, 2025, Brown was signed to the New York Jets practice squad. He was promoted to the active roster on December 27.

On August 30, 2026, Brown was placed on injured reserve. On November 3, he was released with an injury settlement.
