= DaShaun White =

American football player (born 2000)

No. 47 – Dallas Renegades
- Position: Linebacker
- Roster status: Active

Personal information
- Born: January 2, 2000 (age 26)
- Listed height: 6 ft 0 in (1.83 m)
- Listed weight: 214 lb (97 kg)

Career information
- High school: Richland (North Richland Hills, Texas)
- College: Oklahoma (2018–2022)
- NFL draft: 2023: undrafted

Career history
- Michigan Panthers (2023); Buffalo Bills (2023)*; Michigan Panthers (2024); Las Vegas Raiders (2024)*; San Francisco 49ers (2024); Orlando Storm (2026); Houston Gamblers (2026); Dallas Renegades (2027–present)
- * Offseason or practice squad member only

Career NFL statistics as of 2024
- Games played: 1
- Stats at Pro Football Reference

DaShaun Marc White (born January 2, 2000) is an American professional football linebacker for the Dallas Renegades of the United Football League (UFL). He played college football for the Oklahoma Sooners and began his career with the Panthers when they were in the United States Football League (USFL) in 2023. He has also been a member of the Buffalo Bills and Las Vegas Raiders in the National Football League (NFL).

== Early life ==
White was born on January 2, 2000, and grew up in North Richland Hills, Texas. He attended Richland High School where he played football and was a top linebacker, totaling 274 tackles, 26.0 tackles-for-loss (TFLs), 7.0 sacks and eight passes defended in his last three seasons. He was a first-team all-district selection at Richland and was selected to the U.S. Army All-American Bowl. He was ranked a four-star prospect and the ninth-best outside linebacker nationally by 247Sports. He initially committed to play college football for the Texas A&M Aggies, but later flipped his commitment to the Oklahoma Sooners.

== College career ==
As a true freshman at Oklahoma in 2018, White appeared in all 14 games as a backup, posting 13 tackles. He then saw more playing time as a sophomore in 2019, recording 52 tackles and 3.5 TFLs while playing in every game. He started 10 games in 2020, recording 38 tackles, 5.0 TFLs and 2.5 sacks, and then started 12 games in 2021, making 66 tackles and 5.0 TFLs. After having mainly been a middle linebacker at Oklahoma in 2020 and 2021, he was shifted to the team's "Cheetah" linebacker position for his senior year in 2022, described as "a hybrid between a linebacker, slot cornerback, and safety." As a senior in 2022, White tallied a career-best 90 tackles, 6.0 TFLs and two interceptions, being named honorable mention All-Big 12 Conference. He declared for the 2023 NFL draft following the season, concluding his stint at Oklahoma having appeared in 63 games, 49 as a starter, while posting 259 tackles, 19.5 TFLs, 5.5 sacks, two interceptions and two fumble recoveries.

== Professional career ==
Pre-draft measurables
Height	Weight	Arm length	Hand span	Wingspan	40-yard dash	10-yard split	20-yard split	20-yard shuttle	Three-cone drill	Vertical jump	Broad jump	Bench press
6 ft 0 in (1.83 m)	214 lb (97 kg)	32 in (0.81 m)	9 5/8 in (0.24 m)	6 ft 4 3/4 in (1.95 m)	4.66 s	1.64 s	2.70 s	4.44 s	7.34 s	33.5 in (0.85 m)	9 ft 9 in (2.97 m)	12 reps
All values from Pro Day

=== Michigan Panthers (first stint) ===
White was not invited to the NFL Scouting Combine, although he posted a "solid" performance at his pro day. In February 2024, he was selected in the fifth round (32nd overall) of the 2023 USFL draft by the Michigan Panthers. He was not selected in the 2023 NFL draft. Afterwards, he signed with the Panthers on May 18, 2023, during the 2023 USFL season. He appeared in four games during the 2023 season for the Panthers, each as a backup, posting seven tackles.

=== Buffalo Bills ===
After the USFL season, White signed with the Buffalo Bills of the NFL on August 22, 2023, as an undrafted free agent. He appeared in one preseason game, making a tackle. He was waived on August 27.

=== Michigan Panthers (second stint) ===
After having been released by the Bills, White re-signed with the Michigan Panthers on September 12, 2023, for the 2024 USFL season (later the 2024 UFL season). He appeared in six games, one as a starter, making 16 tackles and one tackle-for-loss, as well as recovering a fumble. He was released by the Panthers around May 24, 2024, before the season's end.

=== Las Vegas Raiders ===
White signed with the Las Vegas Raiders on August 21, 2024. He appeared in one preseason game and posted two tackles. He was waived on August 27.

=== San Francisco 49ers ===
White signed with the practice squad of the San Francisco 49ers on September 3, 2024. He was signed from the practice squad to the active roster on January 4, 2025, prior to the team's Week 18 season finale against the Arizona Cardinals. White made his NFL debut in the game, a 47–24 loss, appearing on four special teams snaps. On May 28, White was waived by the 49ers.

=== Michigan Panthers (third stint) ===
White re-signed with the Michigan Panthers on August 12, 2025.

=== Orlando Storm ===
On January 14, 2026, White was selected by the Orlando Storm in the 2026 UFL Draft. He was released on April 28.

=== Houston Gamblers ===
On May 27, 2026, White signed with the Houston Gamblers of the United Football League (UFL).
