= Brian Asamoah =

American football player (born 2000)

No. 41 – Atlanta Falcons
- Position: Linebacker
- Roster status: Practice squad

Personal information
- Born: March 29, 2000 (age 26); Newark, New Jersey, U.S.
- Listed height: 6 ft 1 in (1.85 m)
- Listed weight: 230 lb (104 kg)

Career information
- High school: St. Francis De Sales (Columbus, Ohio)
- College: Oklahoma (2018–2021)
- NFL draft: 2022: 3rd round, 66th overall pick

Career history
- Minnesota Vikings (2022–2024); Tennessee Titans (2025)*; Las Vegas Raiders (2025)*; Cincinnati Bengals (2025); Atlanta Falcons (2026–present)*
- * Offseason or practice squad member only

Awards and highlights
- Second-team All-Big 12 (2021)

Career NFL statistics as of 2025
- Total tackles: 30
- Forced fumbles: 2
- Fumble recoveries: 1
- Stats at Pro Football Reference

Brian Asamoah II (born March 29, 2000) is an American professional football linebacker for the Atlanta Falcons of the National Football League (NFL). He played college football for the Oklahoma Sooners and was drafted by the Minnesota Vikings in the third round of the 2022 NFL draft.

== Early life ==
Asamoah was born to a Ghanaian family and raised in Columbus, Ohio. He attended St. Francis De Sales High School in Columbus. He played linebacker and running back in high school. Asamoah committed to the University of Oklahoma to play college football.

== College career ==
After redshirting his first year at Oklahoma in 2018, Asamoah had 23 tackles and two sacks in 2019. In 2020, he played in eleven games with nine starts and led the team with 66 tackles, two sacks and one interception. As a junior in 2021, Asamoah started 10 of 12 games, recording 90 tackles and two forced fumbles. He decided to sit out the 2021 Alamo Bowl in preparation for the 2022 NFL draft.

== Professional career ==
Pre-draft measurables
Height	Weight	Arm length	Hand span	Wingspan	40-yard dash	10-yard split	20-yard split	Vertical jump	Broad jump	Bench press
6 ft 0 1/4 in (1.84 m)	226 lb (103 kg)	32 5/8 in (0.83 m)	10 in (0.25 m)	6 ft 7 in (2.01 m)	4.56 s	1.55 s	2.63 s	36.5 in (0.93 m)	10 ft 4 in (3.15 m)	23 reps
All values from NFL Combine/Pro Day

=== Minnesota Vikings ===
Asamoah was selected by the Minnesota Vikings with 66th overall pick in the third round of the 2022 NFL draft.

In his first three seasons with the Vikings, he would total 30 combined tackles with his career high being 17 in his rookie season in 2022. Asamoah would also switch his number on three occasions, from 33 to 2 to 6.

On August 12, 2025, Asamoah was waived by the Vikings.

=== Tennessee Titans ===
On August 13, 2025, Asamoah was claimed off waivers by the Tennessee Titans. He was waived on August 26 as part of final roster cuts.

=== Las Vegas Raiders ===
On September 1, 2025, Asamoah signed with the Las Vegas Raiders practice squad. He was released by the Raiders on October 28.

=== Cincinnati Bengals ===
On October 30, 2025, Asamoah signed with the Cincinnati Bengals' practice squad. He was promoted to the active roster on November 10. In four appearances for the Bengals, Asamoah failed to record a stat across 58 special teams snaps. After suffering a knee injury in Week 13 against the Baltimore Ravens, he was placed on injured reserve on December 1.

=== Atlanta Falcons ===
On September 30, 2026, Asamoah was signed to the Atlanta Falcons' practice squad.
