= Jaden Davis =

American football player (born 2001)

No. 28 – Houston Texans
- Position: Cornerback
- Roster status: Practice squad

Personal information
- Born: July 18, 2001 (age 25); Fort Lauderdale, Florida, U.S.
- Listed height: 5 ft 10 in (1.78 m)
- Listed weight: 182 lb (83 kg)

Career information
- High school: St. Thomas Aquinas (Fort Lauderdale)
- College: Oklahoma (2019–2022); Miami (2023)
- NFL draft: 2024: 7th round, 226th overall pick

Career history
- Arizona Cardinals (2024–2025); Houston Texans (2026–present)*
- * Offseason or practice squad member only

Career NFL statistics as of 2025
- Games played: 3
- Total tackles: 3
- Stats at Pro Football Reference

Jaden Davis (born July 18, 2001) is an American professional football cornerback for the Houston Texans of the National Football League (NFL). He played college football for the Oklahoma Sooners and Miami Hurricanes.

== Early life ==
Davis attended St. Thomas Aquinas High School in Fort Lauderdale, Florida, where he was rated a four-star recruit and received held offers from Florida, Georgia, Miami, Michigan, Ohio State, Oklahoma, and Texas.

Davis initially committed to play college football for the Oklahoma Sooners.

== College career ==
=== Oklahoma ===
In week two of the 2019 season, Davis recorded his first career interception against South Dakota State. In week three, he led the Sooners in tackles with six in a 48-14 win over UCLA. In Davis's first three seasons in 2019, 2020, and 2021 he 29 games totaling 66 tackles eight pass deflections, and an interception. During the 2022 season, Davis notched 35 tackles and two pass deflections. After the conclusion of the 2022 season, Davis decided to enter the NCAA transfer portal.

Davis finished his career with the Sooners playing in 47 games where he started in 22, tallying 104 tackles ten pass deflections, and an interception.

=== Miami ===
In May 2023, Davis transferred to play for the Miami Hurricanes. In week two of the 2023 season, he forced a game-changing fumble as he helped the Hurricanes take down Texas A&M. Davis finished the 2023 season with 42 tackles with three being for a loss, a sack, four pass deflections, and two forced fumbles.

== Professional career ==
Pre-draft measurables
Height	Weight	Arm length	Hand span	Wingspan	40-yard dash	10-yard split	20-yard split	20-yard shuttle	Three-cone drill	Vertical jump	Broad jump	Bench press
5 ft 9 3/4 in (1.77 m)	187 lb (85 kg)	29 3/4 in (0.76 m)	9 1/4 in (0.23 m)	6 ft 0 1/8 in (1.83 m)	4.47 s	1.49 s	2.54 s	4.52 s	7.46 s	35.5 in (0.90 m)	9 ft 11 in (3.02 m)	16 reps
All values from Pro Day

=== Arizona Cardinals ===
In the 2024 NFL draft, Davis was selected by the Arizona Cardinals in the seventh round with the 226th overall selection. The Cardinals previously traded safety-linebacker Isaiah Simmons to the New York Giants to acquire the 226th overall selection. He was waived on August 27, and re-signed to the practice squad.

Davis signed a reserve/future contract with Arizona on January 6, 2025. Davis suffered a knee injury in training camp and was placed on injured reserve on July 27. He was waived on August 1. On October 1, Davis was re-signed to the practice squad. He was released on October 30 and re-signed to the practice squad on November 12.

Davis signed a reserve/future contract with Arizona on January 5, 2026. He was placed on injured reserve on July 31, and was released by Arizona on August 5.

=== Houston Texans ===
On October 7, 2026, Davis signed to the Houston Texans practice squad.

== Personal life ==
Two of Davis' cousins, Vernon Davis and Vontae Davis, played in the NFL.
