= Jalen Redmond =

American football player (born 1999)

No. 61 – Minnesota Vikings
- Position: Defensive end
- Roster status: Active

Personal information
- Born: March 12, 1999 (age 27); Midwest City, Oklahoma, U.S.
- Listed height: 6 ft 3 in (1.91 m)
- Listed weight: 305 lb (138 kg)

Career information
- High school: Midwest City (OK)
- College: Oklahoma (2018–2022)
- NFL draft: 2023: undrafted

Career history
- Carolina Panthers (2023)*; Arlington Renegades (2024); Minnesota Vikings (2024–present)
- * Offseason or practice squad member only

Career NFL statistics as of Week 10, 2026
- Tackles: 108
- Sacks: 9.0
- Forced fumbles: 2
- Fumble recoveries: 2
- Pass deflections: 11
- Stats at Pro Football Reference

Jalen Redmond (born March 12, 1999) is an American professional football defensive end for the Minnesota Vikings of the National Football League (NFL). He played college football for the Oklahoma Sooners, and was previously a member of the Carolina Panthers of the NFL and the Arlington Renegades of the United Football League (UFL).

== Early life ==
Redmond was born in Midwest City, Oklahoma. He attended Midwest City High School, but only played basketball his first two years. Football coaches liked his size (6 ft 2 in, 230 lb) and convinced him to tryout for the team as a junior; during spring practice, he received his first athletic scholarship offer from Memphis, despite having not even played a varsity football game yet. That year, playing both defensive end and outside linebacker, Redmond posted 82 tackles and 14 sacks. Offers began flowing in at this point, and by the start of his senior year he had about 20 offers. He posted 87 tackles, 34 TFLs, and 19.5 sacks in his final season, being named first-team all-state by The Oklahoman. A five-star recruit and the 16th-best prospect nationally according to 247Sports, Redmond eventually announced his commitment to play college football for Oklahoma.

== College career ==
At the University of Oklahoma, Redmond was in a position to compete for immediate playing time as a freshman in 2018, but a blood clot issue led to him being ruled out for the season. However, he returned midseason and appeared in three games, before then sitting out the rest, finishing the year with six total tackles. In 2019, he appeared in 13 out of 14 games and posted a team-leading 6.5 sacks and placed third in TFLs with 11. Redmond opted out of the 2020 season due to COVID-19 and his blood clot issues.

Redmond returned to the team in 2021 and appeared in eight games, seven of which he started, and posted 19 tackles, eight TFLs, and 3.5 sacks despite missing five games due to injury. As a senior in 2022, he appeared in 12 games and posted 23 tackles, 10.0 TFLs and four sacks.

== Professional career ==
Redmond impressed at the 2023 NFL Scouting Combine, posting a 40-yard dash time that placed second among players at his position, as well as the second-best 10-yard split, and both the best broad jump and vertical jump for players at his position.

Pre-draft measurables
Height	Weight	Arm length	Hand span	Wingspan	40-yard dash	10-yard split	20-yard split	20-yard shuttle	Three-cone drill	Vertical jump	Broad jump	Bench press
6 ft 2 3/8 in (1.89 m)	291 lb (132 kg)	32 5/8 in (0.83 m)	10 1/8 in (0.26 m)	6 ft 6 1/4 in (1.99 m)	4.81 s	1.71 s	2.80 s	4.51 s	7.30 s	34.5 in (0.88 m)	9 ft 8 in (2.95 m)	27 reps
All values from NFL Combine

=== Carolina Panthers ===
Redmond was signed by the Carolina Panthers as an undrafted free agent on April 29, 2023. He was waived on August 8, 2023.

=== Arlington Renegades ===
On December 11, 2023, Redmond signed with the Arlington Renegades of the XFL. His contract with the team was terminated on June 17, 2024, to sign with an NFL team.

=== Minnesota Vikings ===
On June 18, 2024, Redmond signed with the Minnesota Vikings. He was waived on October 11, but signed with the practice squad three days later. He was promoted to the active roster on November 6.

In week 10 of the 2026 NFL season against the Green Bay Packers, he sacked Jordan Love once of the eight times the Vikings sacked Love. Redmond finished the game with two quarterback hits and one pass deflection in the 30–10 win.

== NFL career statistics ==
Legend
**Bold**	Career high

=== Regular season ===
Year	Team	Games		Tackles					Interceptions						Fumbles				
Year	Team	GP	GS	Cmb	Solo	Ast	Sck	TFL	Int	Yds	Avg	Lng	TD	PD	FF	Fum	FR	Yds	TD
2024	MIN	13	2	18	10	8	1.0	6	0	0	0.0	0	0	2	0	0	0	0	0
2025	MIN	**17**	**15**	**62**	**33**	**29**	**6.0**	**12**	0	0	0.0	0	0	**5**	**1**	0	**2**	0	0
Career		30	17	80	43	37	7.0	18	0	0	0.0	0	0	7	1	0	2	0	0

=== Postseason ===
Year	Team	Games		Tackles					Interceptions						Fumbles				
Year	Team	GP	GS	Cmb	Solo	Ast	Sck	TFL	Int	Yds	Avg	Lng	TD	PD	FF	Fum	FR	Yds	TD
2024	MIN	1	0	1	0	1	0.0	0	0	0	0.0	0	0	0	0	0	0	0	0
Career		1	0	1	0	1	0.0	0	0	0	0.0	0	0	0	0	0	0	0	0
