= Parnell Motley =

American football player (born 1997)

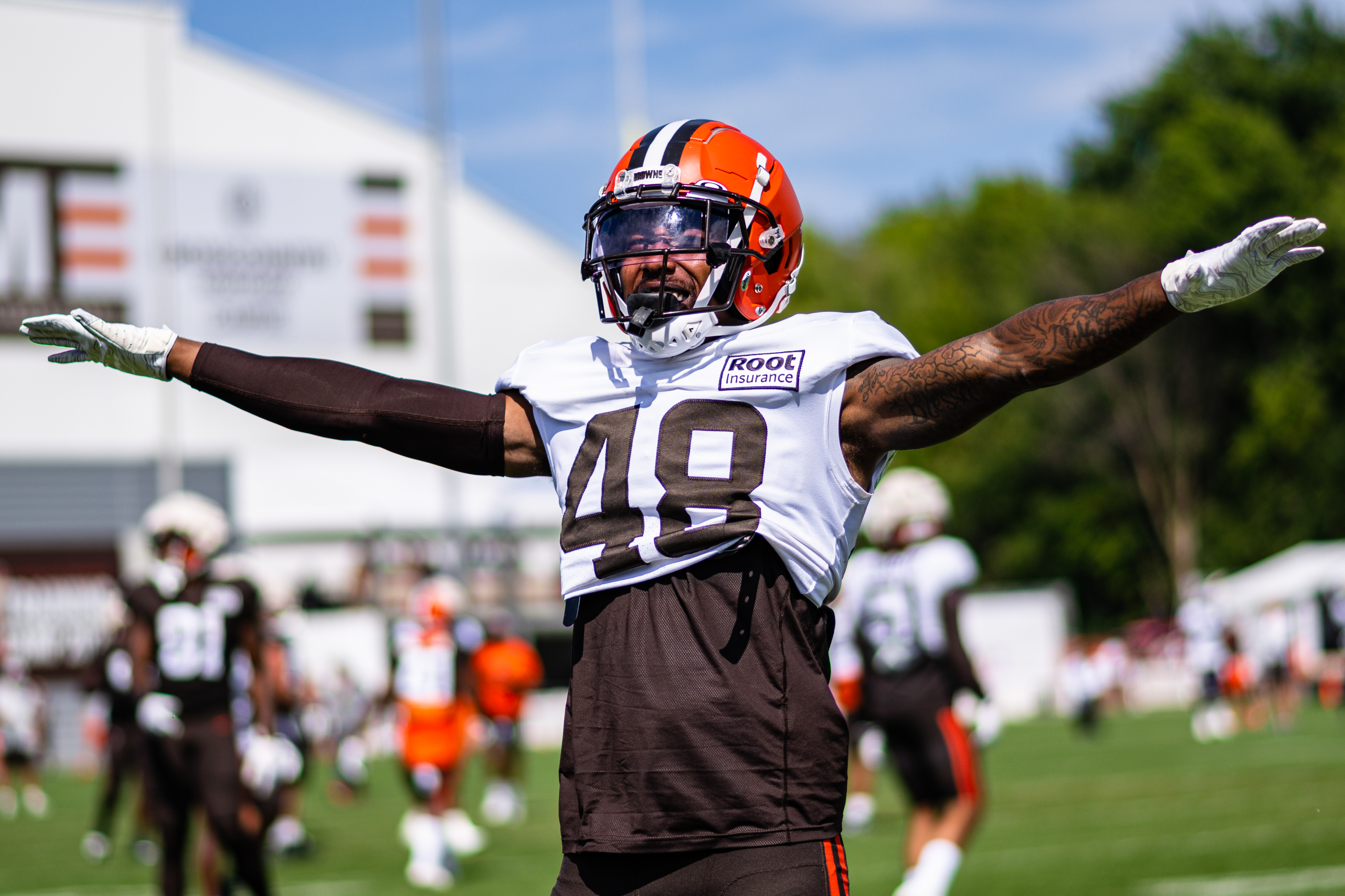
- Motley with the Cleveland Browns in 2022

Profile
- Position: Cornerback

Personal information
- Born: October 28, 1997 (age 29); Washington, D.C., U.S.
- Listed height: 6 ft 0 in (1.83 m)
- Listed weight: 180 lb (82 kg)

Career information
- High school: H. D. Woodson (Washington, D.C.)
- College: Oklahoma
- NFL draft: 2020: undrafted

Career history
- Tampa Bay Buccaneers (2020); San Francisco 49ers (2020); Denver Broncos (2020); Detroit Lions (2021); Cleveland Browns (2022)*; Calgary Stampeders (2022)*; DC Defenders (2023)*; New Orleans Breakers (2023); Toronto Argonauts (2023)*; Montreal Alouettes (2023)*; DC Defenders (2024)*; BC Lions (2024)*
- * Offseason or practice squad member only

Career NFL statistics
- Totsl tackles: 8
- Fumble recoveries: 1
- Pass deflections: 1
- Stats at Pro Football Reference

Parnell Motley (born October 28, 1997) is an American former professional football player who was a cornerback in the National Football League (NFL) and Canadian Football League (CFL). He played college football for the Oklahoma Sooners and signed with the Tampa Bay Buccaneers as an undrafted free agent in 2020. Motley was also a member of the San Francisco 49ers, Denver Broncos, Detroit Lions, Cleveland Browns, Calgary Stampeders, DC Defenders, New Orleans Breakers, Toronto Argonauts, Montreal Alouettes, and BC Lions.

== Professional career ==
Pre-draft measurables
Height	Weight	Arm length	Hand span	40-yard dash	10-yard split	20-yard split	20-yard shuttle	Three-cone drill	Vertical jump	Broad jump	Bench press
6 ft 0 in (1.83 m)	183 lb (83 kg)	31 1/2 in (0.80 m)	8 7/8 in (0.23 m)	4.50 s	1.62 s	2.65 s	4.36 s	7.10 s	30.0 in (0.76 m)	9 ft 0 in (2.74 m)	12 reps
All values from Pro Day

=== Tampa Bay Buccaneers ===
Motley signed with the Tampa Bay Buccaneers as an undrafted free agent on May 4, 2020, and made the team's 53-man roster after training camp. He played in two games before being waived on October 12.

=== San Francisco 49ers ===
On October 13, 2020, Motley was claimed off waivers by the San Francisco 49ers. Motley was waived by the 49ers on October 26, and re-signed to the practice squad two days later.

=== Denver Broncos ===
On December 16, 2020, Motley was signed by the Denver Broncos off the 49ers practice squad. He was waived by the Broncos on August 31, 2021.

=== Detroit Lions ===
On September 2, 2021, Motley was signed to the Detroit Lions' practice squad. He signed a reserve/future contract with the Lions on January 10, 2022. Motley was waived by Detroit on May 10.

=== Cleveland Browns ===
On May 18, 2022, Motley signed with the Cleveland Browns. He was waived by Cleveland on August 22.

=== Calgary Stampeders ===
On September 29, 2022, Motley signed with the Calgary Stampeders of the Canadian Football League (CFL). After spending time on practice roster, he was released at end of the season.

=== DC Defenders (first stint) ===
On November 17, 2022, Motley was selected by the DC Defenders of the XFL.

=== New Orleans Breakers ===
Motley signed with the New Orleans Breakers of the USFL on April 19, 2023, but was released the next day.

=== Toronto Argonauts ===
On April 26, 2023, Motley signed with the Toronto Argonauts of the Canadian Football League (CFL). On May 17, Motley was released by the Argonauts.

=== Montreal Alouettes ===
On September 5, 2023, Motley signed with the Montreal Alouettes of the Canadian Football League (CFL). After six days on practice roster, Motley was released on September 11.

=== DC Defenders (second stint) ===
On December 20, 2023, Motley re-signed with the Defenders. He was not part of the roster after the 2024 UFL dispersal draft on January 15, 2024.

=== BC Lions ===
On January 30, 2024, Motley signed with the BC Lions of the Canadian Football League (CFL). He was released by the Lions on May 3.
